= 2010–11 Talk 'N Text Tropang Texters season =

2010-11 Talk 'N Text Tropang Texters season
- Head coach: Chot Reyes
- General manager: Aboy Castro
- Owners: Smart Communications (an MVP Group subsidiary)

Philippine Cup results
- Record: 20–7 (74.1%)
- Place: 1st
- Playoff finish: Champions (def. San Miguel 4-2)

Commissioner's Cup results
- Record: 15–3 (83.3%)
- Place: 1st
- Playoff finish: Champions (def. Barangay Ginebra 4-2)

Governors Cup results
- Record: 12–8 (60%)
- Place: 1st
- Playoff finish: Runner-up (def. by Petron Blaze, 3-4)

Talk 'N Text Tropang Texters seasons

The 2010–11 Talk 'N Text Tropang Texters season is the 21st season of the franchise in the Philippine Basketball Association (PBA).

== Key dates ==
- August 29: The 2010 PBA Draft took place in Fort Bonifacio, Taguig.

== Draft picks ==
Round	Pick	Player	Height	Position	Nationality	College
no draft picks

== Roster ==
2010–11 Talk 'N Text Tropang Texters roster
Players
Coaches

Pos.	#	POB	Name	Height	Weight	DOB (YYYY–MM–DD)	From
PG	3	(United States)	Jimmy Alapag (C)	5 ft 9 in (1.75 m)	160 lb (73 kg)		Cal State San Bernardino
PF	4	(United States)	Harvey Carey	6 ft 3 in (1.91 m)	210 lb (95 kg)		Sonoma State
G	10	(United States)	Ryan Reyes	6 ft 2 in (1.88 m)	190 lb (86 kg)		Cal State Fullerton
G/F	12	(Philippines)	Larry Fonacier	6 ft 2 in (1.88 m)	170 lb (77 kg)		Ateneo
G	17	(Philippines)	Jayson Castro	5 ft 11 in (1.80 m)	167 lb (76 kg)		Philippine Christian
SF	20	(United States)	Jared Dillinger	6 ft 5 in (1.96 m)	220 lb (100 kg)		Hawaiʻi
F	21	(United States)	Kelly Williams	6 ft 7 in (2.01 m)	215 lb (98 kg)		Oakland
G	27	(Philippines)	Emmerson Oreta	6 ft 1 in (1.85 m)	180 lb (82 kg)		UST
G/F	28	(Philippines)	Mark Yee	6 ft 2 in (1.88 m)	170 lb (77 kg)		San Sebastian (Cavite)
F/C	33	(Philippines)	Ranidel De Ocampo	6 ft 6 in (1.98 m)	200 lb (91 kg)		Saint Francis of Assisi
C	34	(United States)	Ali Peek	6 ft 4 in (1.93 m)	240 lb (109 kg)		Saint Mary's
PF	40	(Japan)	Rich Alvarez	6 ft 4 in (1.93 m)	200 lb (91 kg)		Ateneo
F	51	(Philippines)	Aaron Aban	6 ft 3 in (1.91 m)	200 lb (91 kg)		Letran
C	98	(Philippines)	Gilbert Lao	6 ft 6 in (1.98 m)	210 lb (95 kg)		UST

Head coach

- (Philippines) Chot Reyes (Ateneo)

Assistant coach(es)

- (United States) Norman Black (Saint Joseph's)
- (Philippines) Jamike Jarin (Ateneo)
- (Philippines) Nash Racela (Ateneo)
- (Philippines) Bong Ravena (UE)
- (Philippines) Jaime Macayan (UE)

Legend

- (C) Team captain
- (CI) Commissioner's Cup Import
- (GI) Governors' Cup Import
- (EI) EASL Import
- (DP) Unsigned draft pick
- (FA) Free agent
- (IN) Inactive
- (S) Suspended
- (R) Rookie
- Injured

== Philippine Cup ==
=== Eliminations ===
==== Standings ====
Pos	Team	W	L	PCT	GB	Qualification
1	Talk 'N Text Tropang Texters	11	3	.786 (Note: Head-to-head record: San Miguel 1–1 Talk 'N Text (San Miguel +9))	—	Twice-to-beat in the quarterfinals
2	San Miguel Beermen	11	3	.786	—	Twice-to-beat in the quarterfinals
3	Barangay Ginebra Kings	10	4	.714	1	Best-of-three quarterfinals
4	B-Meg Derby Ace Llamados	7	7	.500 (Note: Head-to-head differential: B-Meg +23, Meralco −11, Alaska −12)	4	Best-of-three quarterfinals
5	Meralco Bolts	7	7	.500	4	Best-of-three quarterfinals
6	Alaska Aces	7	7	.500	4	Best-of-three quarterfinals
7	Air21 Express	6	8	.429	5	Twice-to-win in the quarterfinals
8	Rain or Shine Elasto Painters	5	9	.357	6	Twice-to-win in the quarterfinals
9	Powerade Tigers	3	11	.214 (Note: Head-to-head record: Barako Bull 1–0 Powerade)	8	
10	Barako Bull Energy Boosters	3	11	.214	8	

Source: PBA.ph

== Commissioner's Cup ==
=== Eliminations ===
==== Standings ====
Pos	Team	W	L	PCT	GB	Qualification
1	Talk 'N Text Tropang Texters	8	1	.889	—	Advance to semifinals
2	Smart Gilas (G)	7	2	.778	1	Advance to semifinals
3	Barangay Ginebra Kings	5	4	.556 (Note: Head-to-head differential: Barangay Ginebra +12, Air21 −4, Alaska −8)	3	Advance to quarterfinals
4	Air21 Express	5	4	.556	3	Advance to quarterfinals
5	Alaska Aces	5	4	.556	3	Advance to quarterfinals
6	Rain or Shine Elasto Painters	4	5	.444 (Note: Head-to-head record: Rain or Shine 1–0 B-Meg)	4	Advance to quarterfinals
7	B-Meg Derby Ace Llamados	4	5	.444	4	
8	Meralco Bolts	3	6	.333	5	
9	Powerade Tigers	2	7	.222 (Note: Head-to-head record: Powerade 1–0 San Miguel)	6	
10	San Miguel Beermen	2	7	.222	6	

Source: PBA.ph
(G) Guests

== Governors Cup ==
=== Eliminations ===
==== Standings ====
Pos	Team	W	L	PCT	GB	Qualification
1	Talk 'N Text Tropang Texters	6	2	.750	—	Semifinal round
2	Petron Blaze Boosters	5	3	.625 (Note: Head-to-head differential: Petron +10, Alaska +5, Barangay Ginebra −15)	1	Semifinal round
3	Alaska Aces	5	3	.625	1	Semifinal round
4	Barangay Ginebra Kings	5	3	.625	1	Semifinal round
5	Rain or Shine Elasto Painters	4	4	.500 (Note: Head-to-head differential: Rain or Shine +11, B-Meg 0, Powerade −11)	2	Semifinal round
6	B-Meg Derby Ace Llamados	4	4	.500	2	Semifinal round
7	Powerade Tigers	4	4	.500	2	
8	Meralco Bolts	3	5	.375	3	
9	Air21 Express	0	8	.000	6	

Source: PBA.ph

=== Semifinals ===
==== Standings ====
Overall standings
Pos	Team	W	L	PCT	GB	Qualification
1	Talk 'N Text Tropang Texters	9	4	.692	—	Finals
2	Petron Blaze Boosters	8	5	.615 (Note: Head-to-head differential: Petron +13, Alaska +6, Barangay Ginebra −19)	1	Finals
3	Alaska Aces	8	5	.615	1	
4	Barangay Ginebra Kings	8	5	.615	1	
5	Rain or Shine Elasto Painters	6	7	.462	3	
6	B-Meg Derby Ace Llamados	5	8	.385	4	

Source: PBA.ph
Notes:

Semifinal round standings
Pos	Team	W	L
1	Petron Blaze Boosters	3 (Note: Head-to-head differential: Petron +30, Talk 'N Text +15, Barangay Ginebra −16, Alaska −29)	2
2	Talk 'N Text Tropang Texters	3	2
3	Barangay Ginebra Kings	3	2
4	Alaska Aces	3	2
5	Rain or Shine Elasto Painters	2	3
6	B-Meg Derby Ace Llamados	1	4

Source: PBA.ph

== Transactions ==
=== Pre-season ===
==== Trades ====
August 20, 2010	To Talk 'N Text Ali Peek (from Meralco)	To Air21 J.R. Quiñahan (from Talk 'N Text)	To Meralco Beau Belga (from Air21)
August 20, 2010	To Talk 'N Text Ali Peek (from Meralco); 2010 1st round pick (from Air21)	To Air21 Josh Urbiztondo (from Meralco); 2010 1st round pick (from Meralco)	To Meralco Mark Cardona (from Talk 'N Text)

August 29, 2010	To Talk 'N Text Larry Fonacier	To Alaska 2010 first round pick (Elmer Espiritu)

==== Free agents ====
===== Additions =====
Player	Signed	Former team
Rich Alvarez	September 17, 2010	Air21
Mark Telan	October 1, 2010	Rain or Shine

=== Imports recruited ===
Team	Name	Debuted	Last game	Record
Commissioner's Cup	(United States) Paul Harris	February 25 (vs. Smart Gilas)	May 8 (vs. Barangay Ginebra)	15-3
Governors Cup	(United States) Maurice Baker	June 15 (vs. Alaska)	July 17 (vs. Air21)	6-2
Governors Cup	(United States) Scottie Reynolds	July 22 (vs. Alaska)	August 17 (vs. Petron Blaze)	5-3
Governors Cup	(United States) Maurice Baker*	August 19 (vs. Petron Blaze)	August 21 (vs. Petron Blaze)	1-1
