= 2010 PBA Fiesta Conference finals =

Philippine basketball championship

Team	Coach	Wins
(4) Alaska Aces	Tim Cone	4
(2) San Miguel Beermen	Siot Tanquingcen	2
- Dates: August 6–18, 2010
- MVP: Cyrus Baguio and LA Tenorio
- Television: Solar TV, BTV
- Announcers: See broadcast notes
- Radio network: DZRJ-AM

Referees
- Game 1: B. Cruz, P. Balao, N. Guevara
- Game 2: A. Herrera, J. Ngo, J. Mariano

PBA Fiesta Conference finals chronology
- < 2009

PBA finals chronology
- < 2009–10 Philippine 2010–11 Philippine >

The 2010 Philippine Basketball Association (PBA) Fiesta Conference finals was the best-of-7 basketball championship series of the 2010 PBA Fiesta Conference, and the conclusion of the conference's playoffs. The Alaska Aces and the San Miguel Beermen played for the 99th championship contested by the league.

The Alaska Aces won their 13th league championship with a 4–2 series victory over the defending Fiesta Conference champions San Miguel Beermen.

== Background ==
=== Road to the finals ===
Alaska		San Miguel
Finished 11–7(0.611)—4th	Elimination round	Finished 13–5 (0.722)—Tied for 2nd
Finished 11–7(0.611)—4th	Tiebreak	Def. Derby Ace, 88–83 in seeding playoffs
Bye	Wildcard phase	Bye
Def. Barangay Ginebra, 3–2	Quarterfinals	Bye
Def. Talk 'N Text, 4–3	Semifinals	Def. Derby Ace, 4–2

== Series summary ==
Team	Game 1	Game 2	Game 3	Game 4	Game 5	Game 6	Wins
Alaska	89	94	80	90	94	102	4
San Miguel	83	90	96	83	96	88	2
Venue	Araneta	Araneta	Araneta	Cuneta	Araneta	Araneta

=== Game 1 ===
Solar TV

August 6
7:30 p.m.

Report

Alaska Aces 89, San Miguel Beermen 83
Scoring by quarter: 19–25, 29–17, 18–19, 23–22
Pts: Simpson 20; Rebs: Simpson 21; Asts: Tenorio 8	Pts: Freeman 37; Rebs: Freeman 16; Asts: Cabagnot 5
Alaska leads series, 1–0

Araneta Coliseum, Quezon City
Referees: B. Cruz, P. Balao, N. Guevara

=== Game 2 ===
Solar TV

August 8
6:00 p.m.

Report

Alaska Aces 94, San Miguel Beermen 90
Scoring by quarter: 31–26, 19–19, 25–26, 19–19
Pts: Simpson 29; Rebs: Simpson 17; Asts: Tenorio 4	Pts: Yeo, 2 others 20; Rebs: Freeman 14; Asts: Cabagnot 4
Alaska leads series, 2–0

Araneta Coliseum, Quezon City
Referees: A. Herrera, J. Ngo, J. Mariano

=== Game 3 ===
Solar TV

August 11
7:00 p.m.

Report

Alaska Aces 80, San Miguel Beermen 96
Scoring by quarter: 18–22, 12–27, 24–22, 26–25
Pts: Simpson 16; Rebs: Simpson 11; Asts: Tenorio 6	Pts: Freeman 24; Rebs: Freeman 20; Asts: Miranda 6
Alaska leads series, 2–1

Araneta Coliseum, Quezon City

=== Game 4 ===
Solar TV

August 13
7:00 p.m.

Report

Alaska Aces 90, San Miguel Beermen 83
Scoring by quarter: 20–24, 22–18, 24–21, 24–20
Pts: Tenorio 21; Rebs: Simpson 18; Asts: Simpson 4	Pts: Freeman 28; Rebs: Freeman 17; Asts: Miranda 5
Alaska leads series, 3–1

Cuneta Astrodome, Pasay

=== Game 5 ===
Solar TV

August 15
6:00 p.m.

Report

Alaska Aces 94, San Miguel Beermen 96
Scoring by quarter: 21–26, 18–24, 30–25, 25–21
Pts: Simpson 29; Rebs: Simpson 18; Asts: Cyrus Baguio 8	Pts: Washington 19; Rebs: Freeman 14; Asts: Miranda 5
Alaska leads series, 3–2

Araneta Coliseum, Quezon City

=== Game 6 ===
Solar TV

August 18
7:00 p.m.

Report

Alaska Aces 102, San Miguel Beermen 88
Scoring by quarter: 28–19, 24–25, 25–20, 25–24
Pts: Simpson 28; Rebs: Simpson 19; Asts: Tenorio 10	Pts: Freeman 32; Rebs: Freeman 18; Asts: Miranda 6
Alaska wins series, 4–2

Araneta Coliseum, Quezon City

2010 PBA Fiesta Conference Champions

Alaska Aces
Thirteenth title

== Rosters ==
Alaska Aces roster
Players

Pos.	#	POB	Name	Height	Weight	DOB (YYYY–MM–DD)	From
C	1	(Philippines)	Samigue Eman	6 ft 9 in (2.06 m)	239 lb (108 kg)		Mindanao
G/F	3	(Philippines)	Cyrus Baguio	6 ft 2 in (1.88 m)	180 lb (82 kg)		UST
G	5	(Philippines)	LA Tenorio	5 ft 8 in (1.73 m)	151 lb (68 kg)		Ateneo
C	7	(Papua New Guinea)	Sonny Thoss	6 ft 7 in (2.01 m)	205 lb (93 kg)		James Cook
G	8	(Philippines)	Kelvin dela Peña	6 ft 0 in (1.83 m)	180 lb (82 kg)		Mapúa
F	10	(Philippines)	Mark Borboran	6 ft 4 in (1.93 m)	180 lb (82 kg)		UE
PG	11	(Philippines)	Topex Robinson	5 ft 7 in (1.70 m)	155 lb (70 kg)		San Sebastian
G/F	12	(Philippines)	Larry Fonacier	6 ft 2 in (1.88 m)	170 lb (77 kg)		Ateneo
F	21	(Philippines)	Reynel Hugnatan	6 ft 4 in (1.93 m)	210 lb (95 kg)		Manila
G	22	(Philippines)	Jeffrey Cariaso (C)	6 ft 1 in (1.85 m)	180 lb (82 kg)		Sonoma State
G	24	(United States)	Brandon Cablay	6 ft 0 in (1.83 m)	165 lb (75 kg)		Vanguard
C	30	(Philippines)	Ervin Sotto	6 ft 7 in (2.01 m)	210 lb (95 kg)		Saint Francis of Assisi
F	34	(United States)	Diamon Simpson (I)	6 ft 7 in (2.01 m)	230 lb (104 kg)		Saint Mary's
F	35	(United States)	Tony dela Cruz	6 ft 4 in (1.93 m)	209 lb (95 kg)		UC Irvine
F/C	38	(United States)	Joe Devance	6 ft 7 in (2.01 m)	220 lb (100 kg)		UTEP
F	63	(Switzerland)	Michael Burtscher	6 ft 6 in (1.98 m)	220 lb (100 kg)		San Beda

Coaches
Head coach
- (United States) Tim Cone (James Madison)
Assistant(s)
- (Philippines) Joel Banal (Mapúa)
- (Philippines) Dickie Bachmann (De La Salle)
- (Philippines) Jojo Lastimosa (Ateneo)
- (Philippines) Luigi Trillo (De La Salle)

Legend
- (DP) Unsigned draft pick
- (FA) Free agent
- (S) Suspended
- (I) Import
- Injured

San Miguel Beermen roster
Players

Pos.	#	POB	Name	Height	Weight	DOB (YYYY–MM–DD)	From
G	3	(Philippines)	Jonas Villanueva	6 ft 0 in (1.83 m)	170 lb (77 kg)		Far Eastern
F/C	4	(United States)	Dorian Peña	6 ft 6 in (1.98 m)	235 lb (107 kg)		Coppin State
G	5	(Philippines)	Alex Cabagnot	6 ft 0 in (1.83 m)	165 lb (75 kg)		Hawaiʻi–Hilo
G/F	7	(Philippines)	Dondon Hontiveros	6 ft 2 in (1.88 m)	180 lb (82 kg)		Cebu
F/C	10	(Philippines)	Danny Ildefonso	6 ft 6 in (1.98 m)	210 lb (95 kg)		National-U
G/F	15	(Philippines)	Lordy Tugade	6 ft 3 in (1.91 m)	185 lb (84 kg)		National-U
G	17	(Philippines)	Olsen Racela (C)	5 ft 10 in (1.78 m)	165 lb (75 kg)		Ateneo
G	18	(Philippines)	Joseph Yeo	5 ft 11 in (1.80 m)	170 lb (77 kg)		De La Salle
F	23	(Philippines)	Jay Washington (injured)	6 ft 7 in (2.01 m)	220 lb (100 kg)		Eckerd
SF	25	(United States)	Gabriel Freeman (I)	6 ft 6 in (1.98 m)	220 lb (100 kg)		Mesa CC
F	29	(Philippines)	Arwind Santos	6 ft 4 in (1.93 m)	175 lb (79 kg)		Far Eastern
G	32	(Philippines)	Dennis Miranda	6 ft 0 in (1.83 m)	180 lb (82 kg)		Far Eastern
F/C	34	(Australia)	Mick Pennisi	6 ft 9 in (2.06 m)	235 lb (107 kg)		Eastern Michigan
F	42	(United States)	Danny Seigle (injured)	6 ft 6 in (1.98 m)	205 lb (93 kg)		Wagner
F/C	45	(Philippines)	Michael Holper	6 ft 6 in (1.98 m)	210 lb (95 kg)		San Diego State
G	88	(Philippines)	Chris Calaguio	6 ft 1 in (1.85 m)	180 lb (82 kg)		Letran

Coaches
Head coach
- (Philippines) Siot Tanquingcen (UST)
Assistant(s)
- (Philippines) Gee Abanilla (De La Salle)
- (Philippines) Pido Jarencio (UST)
- (Philippines) Freddie Abuda (Cebu)
- (Philippines) Biboy Ravanes (Cebu)
- (Philippines) Ato Agustin (Lyceum)

Legend
- (DP) Unsigned draft pick
- (FA) Free agent
- (S) Suspended
- (I) Import
- Injured

== Broadcast notes ==
Game	Play-by-play	Analyst	Courtside reporters
Game 1	Mico Halili	Jason Webb	Chiqui Reyes and Patricia Bermudez-Hizon
Game 2	Sev Sarmenta	Andy Jao and Ronnie Magsanoc	Patricia Bermudez-Hizon and Magoo Marjon
Game 3	Richard del Rosario	Ronnie Magsanoc and Jason Webb	Lia Cruz and Dominic Uy
Game 4	Sev Sarmenta	Jason Webb and Andy Jao	Magoo Marjon and Cesca Litton
Game 5	Mico Halili	Ronnie Magsanoc and Quinito Henson	Patricia Bermudez-Hizon and Magoo Marjon
Game 6	Sev Sarmenta	Andy Jao and Jason Webb	Lia Cruz and Chiqui Reyes
