= 2011 PBA Commissioner's Cup finals =

Basketball tournament in the Philippines

Team	Coach	Wins
(1) Talk 'N Text	Chot Reyes	4
(3) Barangay Ginebra	Jong Uichico	2
- Dates: April 27 - May 5, 2011
- MVP: Jimmy Alapag and Jayson Castro
- Television: Solar Sports (Studio 23), BTV
- Announcers: See broadcast notes
- Radio network: DZRJ-AM

Referees
- Game 1: N. Quilinguen, P. Balao, R. Maurillo
- Game 2: P. Balao, J. Mariano, S. Pineda
- Game 3: B. Guevarra, J. Mariano, S. Pineda
- Game 4: N. Quilinguen, P. Balao, R. Maurillo
- Game 5: J. Mariano, B. Guevarra, N. Quilinguen
- Game 6: N. Quilinguen, P. Balao, S. Pineda

PBA Commissioner's Cup finals chronology
- < 2002 2012 >

PBA finals chronology
- < 2010–11 Philippine 2011 Governors >

The 2011 PBA Commissioner's Cup finals was the best-of-7 championship series of the Philippine Basketball Association (PBA) 2011 Commissioner's Cup, and the conclusion of the conference's playoffs. The Talk 'N Text Tropang Texters and the Barangay Ginebra Kings played for the 102nd championship contested by the league.

The Tropang Texters qualified to the playoffs after finishing the elimination round with the #1 seed and a bye up to the semifinals, suffering only one defeat, against Smart Gilas national team in their conference opener. In the semifinals they defeated the Air21 Express in three consecutive games. The Kings on the other hand, finished third and had to beat the Rain or Shine Elasto Painters in the quarterfinals in order to meet Smart Gilas in the semifinals. The Kings defeated #2 seed Smart Gilas in four games to qualify for the finals.

In the finals, the Tropang Texters blew the game wide open in the third quarter after a tightly contested first half to lead the series 1–0. The Kings won Game 2 in a tight contest to tie the series, but the Tropang Texters won comfortably at Puerto Princesa to regain the series lead. Back in Metro Manila, the Tropang Texters won Game 4 after trailing by as much 17 points to move within a win away from the championship, but the Kings won Game 5 to extend the series. In a tightly contested Game 6, Talk 'N Text needed an overtime period to eliminate Ginebra to win their second consecutive PBA championship.

== Background ==
=== Road to the finals ===
Talk 'N Text		Barangay Ginebra
Finished 1st, 8–1 (0.889)	Elimination round	Finished tied for 3rd, 5–4 (0.556)
Finished 1st, 8–1 (0.889)	Tiebreaker	+12 in overall point differential over Air21's -4 and Alaska's -8
Bye	Quarterfinals	Def. Rain or Shine, 2–1
Def. Air21, 3–0	Semifinals	Def. Smart Gilas, 3–1

== Series summary ==
Team	Game 1	Game 2	Game 3	Game 4	Game 5	Game 6*	Wins
Talk 'N Text	102	106	104	91	93	99	4
Barangay Ginebra	83	108	88	84	100	96	2
Venue	Araneta	Cuneta	Puerto Princesa	Araneta	Araneta	Araneta

*overtime

=== Game 1 ===
Solar

April 27
7:00 p.m.

Report

Talk 'N Text Tropang Texters 102, Barangay Ginebra Kings 83
Scoring by quarter: 22–20, 24–27, 27–12, 29–24
Pts: Harris 28; Rebs: Harris 15; Asts: Alapag 5	Pts: Caguioa 23; Rebs: Hatfield 10; Asts: Labagala 5
Talk 'N Text leads series, 1–0

Araneta Coliseum, Quezon City
Referees: N. Quilinguen, P. Balao, R. Maurillo

Ginebra led early in the first quarter, erecting a 16–6 lead but Talk 'N Text scored on a 15–4 run to lead in the first quarter by one point. The Tropang Texters then had another 15–5 run gave them a 39–29 advantage but Ginebra made their own run at the final minutes of the second quarter, capped off by a three-point buzzer-beater by Mark Caguioa to put the Kings up by one point at halftime. At the start of the third quarter, Talk 'N Text limited the Kings to two field goals and scored 14 points to lead by nine points. Talk 'N Text's bench scored 39 points to prevent another Ginebra run to close out the game, with the Tropang Texters leading by as much as 22 at some point.

=== Game 2 ===
Solar

April 29
7:00 p.m.

Report

Talk 'N Text Tropang Texters 106, Barangay Ginebra Kings 108
Scoring by quarter: 30–15, 16–32, 34–29, 26–32
Pts: Harris 24; Rebs: Carey 9 Asts: Alapag 10	Pts: Brumfield 27; Rebs: Brumfield 15; Asts: Brumfield 8
Series tied, 1–1

Cuneta Astrodome, Pasay
Referees: P. Balao, J. Mariano, S. Pineda

Talk 'N Text led early in the game with Paul Harris, Ryan Reyes and Jayson Castro outscoring the entire Ginebra team 30–15 in the first quarter. Robert Labagala and John Wilson scored on hustle plays in the second quarter to give Ginebra the lead 47–46. In the third quarter, Ronald Tubid and Talk 'N Text assistant coach Aboy Castro had a verbal altercation but were separated after Tubid gave Jimmy Alapag a hard foul; Ranidel de Ocampo later scored a three-point shot to tie the game at 71–all. Wilson scored 16 points in the game, including a key three-point play in a Ginebra 9-point run to give them the lead 108–101. Talk 'N Text made a final run and had a chance to win the game, but Alapag missed his three-point shot as time expired.

=== Game 3 ===
Solar

May 1
6:00 p.m.

Report

Talk 'N Text Tropang Texters 104, Barangay Ginebra Kings 88
Scoring by quarter: 31–29, 26–20, 22–25, 25–14
Pts: de Ocampo 21; Rebs: Harris 8 Asts: Alapag 5	Pts: Caguioa 18; Rebs: Brumfield 13; Asts: Cortez 5
Talk 'N Text leads series, 2–1

Puerto Princesa Coliseum, Puerto Princesa
Referees: B. Guevarra, J. Mariano, S. Pineda

Ranidel de Ocampo scored two consecutive three-point shots to give Talk 'N Text a 57–49 lead at halftime. While Caguioa led Ginebra into tying the game at 47–all, De Ocampo, Alapag and Larry Fonacier scored on five more three-point shots to extend Talk 'N Text's lead; Alapag's last three-pointer extended the Tropang Texters' lead to 12 points with 3:49 left in the game. Harvey Carey and Castro scored against the Ginebra defense to give the Tropang Texters an unassailable 18-point lead.

=== Game 4 ===
Solar

May 4
7:00 p.m.

Report

Talk 'N Text Tropang Texters 91, Barangay Ginebra Kings 84
Scoring by quarter: 20–23, 16–26, 23–19, 32–16
Pts: Harris 26; Rebs: Harris 10; Asts: Alapag, Reyes 3	Pts: Brumfield, Caguioa 15; Rebs: Nate Brumfield 15; Asts: Cortez 4
Talk 'N Text leads series, 3–1

Araneta Coliseum, Quezon City
Referees: N. Quilinguen, P. Balao, R. Maurillo

Ginebra erected a 49–36 lead at halftime then extended it to a 55–38 lead early in the third quarter after a JC Intal three-point shot with 10:44 left in the third quarter. Talk 'N Text then had a 24–7 run led by Harris, de Ocampo and Castro, who converted on a jump shot to give the Tropang Texters the lead, 83–77, with 2:16 left in the game. The Kings would not recover and they trailed the series, 3–1.

=== Game 5 ===
Solar

May 6
7:00 pm

Report

Talk 'N Text Tropang Texters 93, Barangay Ginebra Kings 100
Scoring by quarter: 24–18, 14–21, 28–31, 27–30
Pts: Castro 19; Rebs: Peek 9 Asts: Castro 5	Pts: Brumfield 26; Rebs: Brumfield 14; Asts: Brumfield 6
Talk 'N Text leads series, 3–2

Araneta Coliseum, Quezon City
Referees: J. Mariano, B. Guevarra, N. Quilinguen

Both teams figured in a low-scoring first half, with Ginebra holding a 39–38 lead. The Kings started the third quarter with a 9–0 run to extend their lead to ten; Castro scored five points in a 9–2 Talk 'N Text run to cut the lead to one, 58–57. Castro kept the Tropang Texters in the game, but Ginebra broke a 62–all deadlock with a run to lead 70–66 at the end of the third quarter. Castro scored nine more points but Ginebra kept the lead; with the Kings holding a 95–90 lead, the Tropang Texters turned over the ball, which led to a Mike Cortez three-point shot that gave Ginebra an unassailable 98–90 lead.

=== Game 6 ===
Solar

May 8
6:00 pm

Report

Talk 'N Text Tropang Texters 99, Barangay Ginebra Kings 96 (OT)
Scoring by quarter: 23–28, 25–25, 16–21, 24–14, Overtime: 11–8
Pts: Alapag 24; Rebs: Peek 12; Asts: Alapag 6	Pts: Miller 21; Rebs: Brumfield 22; Asts: Brumfield, Miller 4
Talk 'N Text wins series, 4–2

Araneta Coliseum, Quezon City
Referees:

N. Quilinguen, P. Balao, S. Pineda

Ginebra had an 81–65 lead early in the fourth quarter when Talk 'N Text had an 11–0 run as they cut the lead to four points with 5:35 left. Down by two points in the final seconds of the fourth quarter, Alapag drove to the basket and scored a lay-up to tie the game. On the ensuing possession, Labagala also drove to the basket but missed on a floater to send the game into overtime. De Ocampo, Alapag and Castro scored three-point shots to give the Tropang Texters the lead 97–93 when Wilson scored his own three-pointer to cut the lead to one point with 58.3 seconds left in overtime. After Alapag scored on two free throws, Caguioa missed on a difficult three-pointer and Willie Miller turned the ball over as time expired.

Alapag and Castro were named finals co-MVPs for the second consecutive conference.

== Rosters ==
Talk 'N Text Tropang Texters roster
Players
Coaches

Pos.	#	POB	Name	Height	Weight	DOB (YYYY–MM–DD)	From
G	3	(United States)	Jimmy Alapag (C)	5 ft 9 in (1.75 m)	160 lb (73 kg)		Cal State San Bernardino
F	4	(United States)	Harvey Carey	6 ft 3 in (1.91 m)	210 lb (95 kg)		Sonoma State
G	10	(Philippines)	Ryan Reyes	6 ft 2 in (1.88 m)	190 lb (86 kg)		Cal State Fullerton
G/F	11	(United States)	Harris, Paul (I)	6 ft 3 in (1.91 m)	235 lb (107 kg)		Syracuse
G/F	12	(Philippines)	Larry Fonacier	6 ft 2 in (1.88 m)	170 lb (77 kg)		Ateneo
G	17	(Philippines)	Jayson Castro	5 ft 11 in (1.80 m)	167 lb (76 kg)		Philippine Christian
F	20	(United States)	Jared Dillinger	6 ft 5 in (1.96 m)	220 lb (100 kg)		Hawaiʻi
F	21	(United States)	Kelly Williams	6 ft 7 in (2.01 m)	215 lb (98 kg)		Oakland
G	27	(Philippines)	Emerson Oreta	5 ft 11 in (1.80 m)	180 lb (82 kg)		UST
G/F	28	(Philippines)	Mark Yee	6 ft 2 in (1.88 m)	170 lb (77 kg)		San Sebastian (Cavite)
F/C	33	(Philippines)	Ranidel De Ocampo	6 ft 6 in (1.98 m)	200 lb (91 kg)		Saint Francis of Assisi
C	34	(United States)	Ali Peek	6 ft 4 in (1.93 m)	240 lb (109 kg)		Saint Mary's
F	40	(Japan)	Rich Alvarez	6 ft 4 in (1.93 m)	200 lb (91 kg)		Ateneo
F	51	(Philippines)	Aaron Aban	6 ft 3 in (1.91 m)	200 lb (91 kg)		Letran
C	98	(Philippines)	Gilbert Lao	6 ft 6 in (1.98 m)	210 lb (95 kg)		UST

Head coach

- (Philippines) Chot Reyes (Ateneo)

Assistant coach(es)

- (United States) Norman Black (Saint Joseph's)
- (Philippines) Jamike Jarin (Ateneo)
- (Philippines) Nash Racela (Ateneo)
- (Philippines) Bong Ravena (UE)
- (Philippines) Jaime Macayan (UE)

Legend

- (C) Team captain
- (CI) Commissioner's Cup Import
- (GI) Governors' Cup Import
- (EI) EASL Import
- (DP) Unsigned draft pick
- (FA) Free agent
- (IN) Inactive
- (S) Suspended
- (R) Rookie
- (I) Import
- Injured

Barangay Ginebra Kings roster
Players
Coaches

Pos.	#	POB	Name	Height	Weight	DOB (YYYY–MM–DD)	From
G	1	(Philippines)	Mike Cortez	6 ft 0 in (1.83 m)	180 lb (82 kg)		De La Salle
F/C	2	(Philippines)	Billy Mamaril	6 ft 5 in (1.96 m)	220 lb (100 kg)		Bakersfield
G/F	4	(Philippines)	Jimbo Aquino (R)	6 ft 1 in (1.85 m)	180 lb (82 kg)		San Sebastian
F	6	(Philippines)	JC Intal	6 ft 4 in (1.93 m)	195 lb (88 kg)		Ateneo
G	9	(Philippines)	Rob Labagala (R)	5 ft 9 in (1.75 m)	170 lb (77 kg)		UE
G	11	(Philippines)	Willie Miller	5 ft 11 in (1.80 m)	180 lb (82 kg)		Letran
G	13	(Philippines)	Jayjay Helterbrand (injured)	5 ft 11 in (1.80 m)	170 lb (77 kg)		Kentucky State
F	15	(United States)	Nate Brumfield (I)	6 ft 4 in (1.93 m)	175 lb (79 kg)		Oklahoma Baptist
C	18	(Philippines)	Yancy de Ocampo	6 ft 8 in (2.03 m)	220 lb (100 kg)		Saint Francis of Assisi
F/C	23	(Philippines)	Enrico Villanueva (injured)	6 ft 5 in (1.96 m)	210 lb (95 kg)		Ateneo
G/F	24	(Philippines)	Wilson, John (R)	6 ft 2 in (1.88 m)	185 lb (84 kg)		José Rizal
F	27	(United States)	Willy Wilson	6 ft 3 in (1.91 m)	200 lb (91 kg)		De La Salle
F/C	30	(United States)	Eric Menk (C)	6 ft 6 in (1.98 m)	220 lb (100 kg)		Lake Superior State
G	47	(Philippines)	Mark Caguioa	6 ft 0 in (1.83 m)	190 lb (86 kg)		Glendale CC (CA)
G/F	71	(Philippines)	Ronald Tubid	6 ft 1 in (1.85 m)	185 lb (84 kg)		UE
F	99	(United States)	Rudy Hatfield	6 ft 4 in (1.93 m)	205 lb (93 kg)		UM–Dearborn

Head coach

- (Philippines) Jong Uichico (De La Salle)

Assistant coach(es)

- (Philippines) Siot Tanquingcen (UST)
- (Philippines) Juno Sauler (De La Salle)
- (Philippines) Allan Caidic (UE)

Legend

- (C) Team captain
- (CI) Commissioner's Cup Import
- (GI) Governors' Cup Import
- (EI) EASL Import
- (DP) Unsigned draft pick
- (FA) Free agent
- (IN) Inactive
- (S) Suspended
- (R) Rookie
- (I) Import
- Injured

== Broadcast notes ==
Game	Play-by-play	Analyst	Courtside reporters
Game 1	Mico Halili	Andy Jao and Yeng Guiao	Magoo Marjon
Game 2	Richard del Rosario	Quinito Henson and Tim Cone	Patricia Bermudez-Hizon
Game 3	Sev Sarmenta	Andy Jao	Cesca Litton
Game 4	Sev Sarmenta	Jason Webb and Ryan Gregorio	Dominic Uy
Game 5	Richard del Rosario	Andy Jao and Yeng Guiao	Chiqui Reyes
Game 6	Patricia Bermudez-Hizon	Jason Webb and Tim Cone	Magoo Marjon and Jinno Rufino
