= 2010–11 PBA Philippine Cup finals =

2010 Basketball championship

Team	Coach	Wins
(1) Talk 'N Text	Chot Reyes	4
(2) San Miguel	Ato Agustin	2
- Dates: January 22 – February 4, 2011
- MVP: Jimmy Alapag and Jayson Castro
- Television: Solar TV, BTV
- Announcers: See broadcast notes
- Radio network: DZRJ-AM

Referees
- Game 1: A. Herrera, B. Guevarra, J. Mariano
- Game 2: A. Herrera, B. Guevarra, J. Mariano
- Game 3: B. Cruz, A. Herrera, N. Quilinguen
- Game 4: N. Quilinguen, B. Guevarra, J. Mariano
- Game 5: B. Cruz, N. Sambrano, S. Pineda
- Game 6: P. Balao, N. Sambrano, S. Pineda

PBA Philippine Cup finals chronology
- < 2009–10 2011–12 >

PBA finals chronology
- < 2010 Fiesta 2011 Commissioner's >

The 2010–11 PBA Philippine Cup finals was the best-of-7 championship series of the 2010–11 PBA Philippine Cup, and the conclusion of the conference's playoffs. The Talk 'N Text Tropang Texters and the San Miguel Beermen played for the 101st championship contested by the league. Talk 'N Text won the series, 4–2, capturing their 3rd overall title.

== Background ==
=== Road to the finals ===
Talk 'N Text		San Miguel
Finished 11–3 (0.786): Tied for 1st*	Elimination round	Finished 11–3 (0.786): Tied for 1st*
+9	*Tiebreaker	−9
Def. Rain or Shine, 107–92	Quarterfinals	Def. Air21, 95–75
Def. B-Meg Derby Ace, 4–2	Semifinals	Def. Barangay Ginebra, 4–2

== Series summary ==
Team	Game 1	Game 2	Game 3	Game 4	Game 5	Game 6	Wins
Talk 'N Text	91	110	82	87	99	95	4
San Miguel	82	102	103	91	77	82	2
Venue	Victorias	Cuneta	Araneta	Araneta	Araneta	Araneta

=== Game 1 ===
Solar TV

January 22
6:00 p.m.

Report

Talk 'N Text Tropang Texters 91, San Miguel Beermen 82
Scoring by quarter: 19–20, 25–26, 23–22, 24–14
Pts: Castro 16; Rebs: Peek 11; Asts: Castro 5	Pts: Washington 14; Rebs: Santos 15; Asts: Cabagnot 6
Talk 'N Text leads series, 1–0

Victorias City Sports and Amusement Center, Victorias, Negros Occidental
Referees: A. Herrera, B. Guevarra, J. Mariano

=== Game 2 ===
Solar TV

January 26
7:00 p.m.

Report

Talk 'N Text Tropang Texters 110, San Miguel Beermen 102
Scoring by quarter: 21–22, 21–18, 31–29, 37–33
Pts: Dillinger 20; Rebs: Peek 12; Asts: Castro 5	Pts: Washington 20; Rebs: Hontiveros 10; Asts: Racela 5
Talk 'N Text leads series, 2–0

Cuneta Astrodome, Pasay
Referees: A.Herrera, B. Guevarra, J.Mariano

=== Game 3 ===
Solar TV

January 28
7:00 p.m.

Report

Talk 'N Text Tropang Texters 82, San Miguel Beermen 103
Scoring by quarter: 17–25, 19–22, 20–27, 26–29
Pts: Castro 13; Rebs: Williams 8 Asts: Castro 3	Pts: Santos 20; Rebs: Washington 15; Asts: Ildefonso 6
Talk 'N Text leads series 2–1

Araneta Coliseum, Quezon City
Referees: B. Cruz, A. Herrera, N. Quilinguen

=== Game 4 ===
Solar TV

January 30
6:00 p.m.

Report

Talk 'N Text Tropang Texters 87, San Miguel Beermen 91
Scoring by quarter: 17–23, 14–19, 27–28, 29–21
Pts: de Ocampo 19; Rebs: Carey 15; Asts: de Ocampo 4	Pts: Washington 25; Rebs: Peña 10; Asts: Cabagnot 7
Series tied, 2–2

Araneta Coliseum, Quezon City
Referees: N. Quilinguen, B. Guevarra, J. Mariano

=== Game 5 ===
Solar TV

February 2
7:00 p.m.

Report

Talk 'N Text Tropang Texters 99, San Miguel Beermen 77
Scoring by quarter: 14–23, 38–21, 22–20, 25–13
Pts: de Ocampo 20; Rebs: de Ocampo, 3 others 7 Asts: Alapag 10	Pts: Santos, Washington 18; Rebs: Washington 12; Asts: Cabagnot 6
Talk 'N Text leads series, 3–2

Araneta Coliseum, Quezon City
Attendance: 15,756
Referees: B. Cruz, N. Sambrano, S. Pineda

=== Game 6 ===
Solar TV

February 4
7:00 p.m.

Report

Talk 'N Text Tropang Texters 95, San Miguel Beermen 82
Scoring by quarter: 32–22, 19–25, 18–15, 26–20
Pts: Reyes 17; Rebs: Carey 9 Asts: Alapag 10	Pts: Washington 29; Rebs: Washington 18; Asts: Cabagnot 4
Talk 'N Text wins series 4–2

Araneta Coliseum, Quezon City
Referees: P. Balao, N. Sambrano, S. Pineda

== Rosters ==
Talk 'N Text Tropang Texters roster
Players

Pos.	#	POB	Name	Height	Weight	DOB (YYYY–MM–DD)	From
G	3	(United States)	Jimmy Alapag (C)	5 ft 9 in (1.75 m)	160 lb (73 kg)		Cal State San Bernardino
F	4	(United States)	Harvey Carey	6 ft 3 in (1.91 m)	210 lb (95 kg)		Sonoma State
G	10	(Philippines)	Ryan Reyes	6 ft 2 in (1.88 m)	190 lb (86 kg)		Cal State Fullerton
G/F	12	(Philippines)	Larry Fonacier	6 ft 2 in (1.88 m)	170 lb (77 kg)		Ateneo
F/C	13	(Philippines)	Mark Telan	6 ft 6 in (1.98 m)	220 lb (100 kg)		De La Salle
G	17	(Philippines)	Jayson Castro	5 ft 11 in (1.80 m)	167 lb (76 kg)		Philippine Christian
F	20	(United States)	Jared Dillinger	6 ft 5 in (1.96 m)	220 lb (100 kg)		Hawaiʻi
F	21	(United States)	Kelly Williams	6 ft 7 in (2.01 m)	215 lb (98 kg)		Oakland
G	27	(Philippines)	Emerson Oreta	5 ft 11 in (1.80 m)	180 lb (82 kg)		UST
G/F	28	(Philippines)	Mark Yee	6 ft 2 in (1.88 m)	170 lb (77 kg)		San Sebastian (Cavite)
F/C	33	(Philippines)	Ranidel De Ocampo	6 ft 6 in (1.98 m)	200 lb (91 kg)		Saint Francis of Assisi
F/C	34	(United States)	Ali Peek	6 ft 4 in (1.93 m)	240 lb (109 kg)		Saint Mary's
F	40	(Japan)	Rich Alvarez	6 ft 4 in (1.93 m)	200 lb (91 kg)		Ateneo
G/F	51	(Philippines)	Aaron Aban	6 ft 3 in (1.91 m)	200 lb (91 kg)		Letran
F/C	98	(Philippines)	Gilbert Lao	6 ft 6 in (1.98 m)	210 lb (95 kg)		UST

Coaches
Head coach
- (Philippines) Chot Reyes (Ateneo)
Assistant(s)
- (United States) Norman Black (Saint Joseph's)
- (Philippines) Jamike Jarin (Ateneo)
- (Philippines) Nash Racela (Ateneo)
- (Philippines) Bong Ravena (UE)
- (Philippines) Jaime Macayan (UE)

Legend
- (DP) Unsigned draft pick
- (FA) Free agent
- (S) Suspended
- Injured

San Miguel Beermen roster
Players

Pos.	#	POB	Name	Height	Weight	DOB (YYYY–MM–DD)	From
C	4	(United States)	Dorian Peña	6 ft 6 in (1.98 m)	235 lb (107 kg)		Coppin State
G	5	(Philippines)	Alex Cabagnot	6 ft 0 in (1.83 m)	165 lb (75 kg)		Hawaiʻi–Hilo
G/F	7	(Philippines)	Dondon Hontiveros	6 ft 2 in (1.88 m)	180 lb (82 kg)		Cebu
F/C	10	(Philippines)	Danny Ildefonso	6 ft 5 in (1.96 m)	210 lb (95 kg)		National-U
G	16	(Philippines)	Paul Artadi	5 ft 9 in (1.75 m)	170 lb (77 kg)		UE
G	17	(Philippines)	Olsen Racela (C)	5 ft 10 in (1.78 m)	165 lb (75 kg)		Ateneo
G	18	(Philippines)	Joseph Yeo	6 ft 2 in (1.88 m)	170 lb (77 kg)		De La Salle
F	23	(Philippines)	Jay Washington	6 ft 6 in (1.98 m)	220 lb (100 kg)		Eckerd
F	29	(Philippines)	Arwind Santos	6 ft 4 in (1.93 m)	175 lb (79 kg)		Far Eastern
G	32	(Philippines)	Dennis Miranda	5 ft 11 in (1.80 m)	185 lb (84 kg)		Far Eastern
C	34	(Australia)	Mick Pennisi	6 ft 9 in (2.06 m)	240 lb (109 kg)		BYU–Hawaii
F	42	(United States)	Danny Seigle	6 ft 6 in (1.98 m)	205 lb (93 kg)		Wagner
F	80	(Philippines)	Sunday Salvacion	6 ft 3 in (1.91 m)	190 lb (86 kg)		St. Benilde

Coaches
Head coach
- (Philippines) Ato Agustin (Lyceum)
Assistant(s)
- (Philippines) Gee Abanilla (De La Salle)
- (Philippines) Pido Jarencio (UST)
- (Philippines) Freddie Abuda (Cebu)
- (Philippines) Biboy Ravanes (Cebu)

Legend
- (DP) Unsigned draft pick
- (FA) Free agent
- (S) Suspended
- Injured

== Broadcast notes ==
Game	Play-by-play	Analyst	Courtside reporters	Off-court commentators
Game 1	Mico Halili	Jason Webb	none	Patricia Bermudez-Hizon and Bo Perasol
Game 2	Sev Sarmenta	Quinito Henson	Magoo Marjon and Dominic Uy	Richard del Rosario and Yeng Guiao
Game 3	Mico Halili	Andy Jao	Chiqui Reyes and Mica Abesamis	Magoo Marjon and Bo Perasol
Game 4	Mico Halili	Jason Webb	Patricia Bermudez-Hizon and Jinno Rufino	Paolo Trillo and Ryan Gregorio
Game 5	Mico Halili	Quinito Henson	Chiqui Reyes and Dominic Uy	Patricia Bermudez-Hizon and Tim Cone
Game 6	Sev Sarmenta	Andy Jao	Patricia Bermudez-Hizon and Magoo Marjon	Richard del Rosario and Yeng Guiao
