= 2008–09 PBA Philippine Cup finals =

Basketball cup finals

Team	Coach	Wins
(2) Talk 'N Text Tropang Texters	Chot Reyes	4
(1) Alaska Aces	Tim Cone	3
- Dates: January 28 – February 11, 2009
- MVP: Mark Cardona
- Television: C/S9, BTV
- Announcers: See broadcast notes
- Radio network: Radyo PBA
- Announcers: See broadcast notes

Referees
- Game 1: Aldaba, Balao, Ngo
- Game 2: Herrera, Ferrer, Sambrano
- Game 3: Cruz, Ngo, Maurillo
- Game 4: Calungcaguin, Aldaba, Quilinguen
- Game 5: Cruz, Ferrer, Balao
- Game 6: Aldaba, N. Sambrano, R. Mangibin
- Game 7: Cruz, Aldaba, Maurillo

PBA Philippine Cup finals chronology
- < 2007–08 2009–10 >

PBA finals chronology
- < 2008 Fiesta 2009 Fiesta >

The 2008–09 PBA Philippine Cup finals was the best-of-7 championship series of the 2008–09 PBA Philippine Cup and the conclusion of the conference's playoffs. The Alaska Aces and the Talk 'N Text Tropang Texters played for the 96th championship contested by the league.

This was the first Philippine Cup finals where no team from the San Miguel Corporation took part since 2000, and the second time the Aces and the Tropang Texters met in the finals, the first was from the 2007 PBA Fiesta Conference in which the Aces won in seven games.

== Background ==
Talk 'N Text		Alaska
Finished 11–7 (.611): 2nd	Elimination round	Finished 12–6 (.677): 1st
Bye	Wildcard phase	Bye
Bye	Quarterfinals	Bye
Def. San Miguel, 4–2	Semifinals	Def. Sta. Lucia, 4–2

== Series summary ==
Team	Game 1	Game 2	Game 3	Game 4	Game 5	Game 6	Game 7	Wins
Talk 'N Text	95	91	92	100	93	99	93	4
Alaska	102	100	73	98	95	94	89	3
Venue	Araneta	Araneta	Araneta	Araneta	Cuneta	Araneta	Araneta

=== Game 1 ===
C/S9

January 28
7:30 p.m.

boxscore

Talk 'N Text Tropang Texters 95, Alaska Aces 102
Scoring by quarter: 30–23, 14–24, 29–25, 22–30
Pts: Castro 18; Rebs: Carey 15; Asts: Cardona 4	Pts: Tenorio 27; Rebs: dela Cruz 14; Asts: Miller 9
Alaska leads series, 1–0

Araneta Coliseum, Quezon City
Referees: Aldaba, Balao, Ngo

=== Game 2 ===
C/S9

January 30
7:00 p.m.

boxscore

Talk 'N Text Tropang Texters 91, Alaska Aces 100
Scoring by quarter: 19–25, 36–29, 24–22, 12–24
Pts: de Ocampo 20; Rebs: Carey 9 Asts: Cardona, Castro 5	Pts: Devance 24; Rebs: dela Cruz, Devance 9 Asts: Tenorio 10
Alaska leads series, 2–0

Araneta Coliseum, Quezon City
Referees: Herrera, Ferrer, Sambrano

=== Game 3 ===
C/S9

February 1
6:00 p.m.

boxscore

Talk 'N Text Tropang Texters 92, Alaska Aces 73
Pts: Cardona 23; Rebs: Carey 14; Asts: Castro 7	Pts: Fonacier, Hugnatan, Thoss 13; Rebs: Hugnatan 12; Asts: Tenorio 6
Alaska leads series, 2–1

Araneta Coliseum, Quezon City
Referees: Cruz, Ngo, Maurillo

=== Game 4 ===
C/S9

February 4
7:00 p.m.

boxscore

Talk 'N Text Tropang Texters 100, Alaska Aces 98
Pts: Alapag 20; Rebs: Carey 9 Asts: Castro 5	Pts: Devance 24; Rebs: Thoss 11; Asts: Miller 9
Series tied, 2–2

Araneta Coliseum, Quezon City
Referees: Calungcaguin, Aldaba, Quilinguen

=== Game 5 ===
C/S9

February 6
7:00 p.m.

boxscore

Talk 'N Text Tropang Texters 93, Alaska Aces 95
Pts: Cardona 23; Rebs: de Ocampo 11; Asts: Castro 7	Pts: Thoss 20; Rebs: Hugnatan 10; Asts: Tenorio 12
Alaska leads series, 3–2

Cuneta Astrodome, Pasay
Referees: Cruz, Ferrer, Balao

Conference best player Willie Miller knocked in a big triple to make up for two crucial errors down the stretch. TNT had a chance to salvage the game but Renren Ritualo misfired his own three-point try then Harvey Carey missed a tip-in in the last eight seconds.

=== Game 6 ===
C/S9

February 8
6:00 p.m.

boxscore

Talk 'N Text Tropang Texters 99, Alaska Aces 94
Pts: Cardona 23; Rebs: Peek 16; Asts: Alapag 6	Pts: Miller 22; Rebs: Ferriols 10; Asts: Miller 7
Series tied, 3–3

Araneta Coliseum, Quezon City
Attendance: 13,034
Referees: Aldaba, Sambrano, N., Mangibin R

=== Game 7 ===
C/S9

February 11
7:00 p.m.

boxscore

Talk 'N Text Tropang Texters 93, Alaska Aces 89
Pts: Cardona 23; Rebs: de Ocampo 11; Asts: Castro 8	Pts: Miller 22; Rebs: Devance 14; Asts: Miller 8
Talk 'N Text wins series, 4–3

Araneta Coliseum, Quezon City
Attendance: 18,388
Referees: Cruz, Aldaba, Maurillo

== Rosters ==
Talk 'N Text Tropang Texters roster
Players

Pos.	#	POB	Name	Height	Weight	DOB (YYYY–MM–DD)	From
PF	2	(United States)	Robert Reyes	6 ft 6 in (1.98 m)	225 lb (102 kg)		Flagler
PG	3	(United States)	Jimmy Alapag	5 ft 9 in (1.75 m)	151 lb (68 kg)		Cal State San Bernardino
SF	4	(United States)	Harvey Carey	6 ft 5 in (1.96 m)	197 lb (89 kg)		Sonoma State
SG	9	(Philippines)	Mark Cardona	6 ft 2 in (1.88 m)	205 lb (93 kg)		De La Salle
SF	10	(Philippines)	Yousif Aljamal	6 ft 5 in (1.96 m)	215 lb (98 kg)		San Beda
SG	11	(Philippines)	Pong Escobal	6 ft 1 in (1.85 m)	184 lb (83 kg)		San Beda
SG	14	(Philippines)	Ren-Ren Ritualo	6 ft 2 in (1.88 m)	213 lb (97 kg)		De La Salle
PG	17	(Philippines)	Jayson Castro	5 ft 10 in (1.78 m)	205 lb (93 kg)		Philippine Christian
F/C	18	(Philippines)	Yancy de Ocampo	6 ft 9 in (2.06 m)	217 lb (98 kg)		Saint Francis of Assisi
SF	20	(United States)	Jared Dillinger	6 ft 5 in (1.96 m)	220 lb (100 kg)		Hawaiʻi
SG	24	(Philippines)	Gec Chia	6 ft 3 in (1.91 m)	214 lb (97 kg)		Ateneo
PF	33	(Philippines)	Ranidel de Ocampo	6 ft 6 in (1.98 m)	210 lb (95 kg)		Saint Francis of Assisi
F/C	34	(United States)	Ali Peek	6 ft 6 in (1.98 m)	255 lb (116 kg)		Saint Mary's
PF	98	(Philippines)	Gilbert Lao	6 ft 7 in (2.01 m)	225 lb (102 kg)		UST

Coaches
Head coach
- (Philippines) Chot Reyes (Ateneo)
Assistant(s)
- Aboy Castro (Philippines)
- (Philippines) Nash Racela (De La Salle)
- (Philippines) Patrick Fran (UST)
- (Philippines) Bong Ravena (UE)

Legend
- (DP) Unsigned draft pick
- (FA) Free agent
- (S) Suspended
- Injured

Alaska Aces roster
Players

Pos.	#	POB	Name	Height	Weight	DOB (YYYY–MM–DD)	From
C	7	(Papua New Guinea)	Sonny Thoss	6 ft 7 in (2.01 m)	205 lb (93 kg)		James Cook
PG	9	(Philippines)	LA Tenorio	5 ft 8 in (1.73 m)	151 lb (68 kg)		Ateneo
SF	10	(Philippines)	Mark Borboran	6 ft 4 in (1.93 m)	197 lb (89 kg)		UE
PG	11	(Philippines)	Miller, Willie	5 ft 11 in (1.80 m)	195 lb (88 kg)		Letran
SG	12	(Philippines)	Larry Fonacier	6 ft 2 in (1.88 m)	170 lb (77 kg)		Ateneo
PG	15	(Philippines)	Kelvin dela Peña (injured)	6 ft 1 in (1.85 m)	180 lb (82 kg)		Mapúa
PF	21	(Philippines)	Reynel Hugnatan	6 ft 4 in (1.93 m)	210 lb (95 kg)		Manila
SG	22	(United States)	Jeffrey Cariaso (C)	6 ft 3 in (1.91 m)	180 lb (82 kg)		Sonoma State
F/C	30	(Philippines)	Ervin Sotto	6 ft 7 in (2.01 m)	210 lb (95 kg)		Saint Francis of Assisi
SF	35	(United States)	Tony dela Cruz	6 ft 5 in (1.96 m)	205 lb (93 kg)		UC Irvine
SF	38	(United States)	Joe Devance	6 ft 7 in (2.01 m)	225 lb (102 kg)		UTEP
PF	55	(Philippines)	John Ferriols	6 ft 4 in (1.93 m)	210 lb (95 kg)		USJ–R

Coaches
Head coach
- (United States) Tim Cone
Assistant(s)
- (Philippines) Joel Banal (Mapúa)
- (Philippines) Jojo Lastimosa (Ateneo)
- (Philippines) Dickie Bachmann (De La Salle)
- (Philippines) Luigi Trillo (De La Salle)
- (Philippines) Bong Hawkins (UPHSD)

Legend
- (DP) Unsigned draft pick
- (FA) Free agent
- (S) Suspended
- Injured

== Broadcast notes ==
Game	Play-by-play	Analyst	Courtside reporters
Game 1	Mico Halili	Quinito Henson	Dominic Uy & Lia Cruz
Game 2	Ed Picson	Jason Webb	Eric Reyes & Reema Chanco
Game 3	Mico Halili	Andy Jao	Patricia Bermudez-Hizon & Peaches Aberin
Game 4	Jude Turcuato	Quinito Henson	Magoo Marjon & Cesca Litton
Game 5	Ed Picson	Jason Webb	Chiqui Reyes & Reema Chanco
Game 6	Mico Halili	Andy Jao	Dominic Uy & Lia Cruz
Game 7	Jude Turcuato	Norman Black	Dominic Uy & Cesca Litton

*Magoo Marjon Alternate for Ed Picson who mistakenly went to the Araneta Coliseum instead of the Cuneta Astrodome which was the Game 5 venue.

Music used in the coverage were "We Made It" by Busta Rhymes featuring Linkin Park.
