= Aboy Castro =

Filipino basketball coach and corporate executive

- Education: University of the Philippines Diliman
- Occupations: Businessman; Basketball executive and coach; Corporate executive
- Known for: Founder and CEO of CleanTech Global Renewables
- Basketball career
- Coaching career: 2002–2010

Career history

Coaching
- 2002–2005: Coca-Cola Tigers (assistant)
- 2005–2007: Philippines (assistant)
- 2006–2007: San Miguel Beermen (assistant)
- 2007–2010: Talk 'N Text Tropang Texters (assistant)
- 2008–2010: UP

Career highlights
- As assistant coach: 3× PBA champion (2002 All-Filipino, 2003 Reinforced, 2009 Philippine); As executive: 4× PBA champion (2011 Philippine, 2011 Commissioner's, 2012 Philippine, 2012–13 Philippine)
Medals
Men's basketball
Assistant coach for Philippines
William Jones Cup
Bronze medal – third place	2005 Taipei	Team
Bronze medal – third place	2007 Taipei	Team

Salvador Antonio R. Castro Jr., Also known as Aboy Castro is a Filipino entrepreneur, basketball coach and executive.

== Sports career ==
=== Assistant ===
Castro served as an assistant to Chot Reyes from 2002 with Coca-Cola Tigers, San Miguel Beermen, and Talk 'N Text Tropang Texters. Castro also served as an assistant coach for Philippine Team from 2005 to 2007.

=== UP Maroons head coach ===
Castro was head coach of UP Fighting Maroons from 2008 until 2010.

=== Managerial career ===
Castro became manager of Tropang Texters from 2010 until 2013, when Paolo Trillo take over.

He later became manager of the Philippine Basketball Team competed for 2014 FIBA Basketball World Cup and 2014 Asian Games.

== Corporate career ==
Before coaching, Castro served as a senior manager for Procter & Gamble.

After coaching, he founded CleanTech Global Renewables, and served as its CEO.

== Coaching record ==
=== Collegiate record ===
Season	W	L	PCT	Finish	PG	PW	PL	PPCT	Results
UP Fighting Maroons (UAAP)
2008	3	11	.214	6th	–	–	–	–	Eliminated
2009	3	11	.214	8th	–	–	–	–	Eliminated
2010	0	2	.000	8th	–	–	–	–	(resigned)
Totals	6	24	.200		0	0	0	.000	0 championship
