= Hizon =

Hizon is a Filipino surname. Notable people with the surname include:

- Rico Hizon (born 1966), Filipino journalist
- Vince Hizon (born 1970), American-born Filipino basketball player
- Jheric Hizon (born 1972), Filipino Canadian Hiphop artist and DJ

== See also ==
- Patricia Bermudez-Hizon (born 1977), Filipino television host
