= Gilbert Lao =

Filipino basketball player (born 1978)

Adamson Soaring Falcons
- Title: Assistant coach
- League: UAAP

Personal information
- Born: September 13, 1978 (age 48)
- Listed height: 6 ft 7 in (2.01 m)
- Listed weight: 210 lb (95 kg)

Career information
- College: UST
- PBA draft: 2002: 2nd round, 11th overall pick
- Drafted by: Coca-Cola Tigers
- Playing career: 2002–2014
- Position: Center / Power forward
- Number: 9, 80, 98, 18
- Coaching career: 2014–present

Career history

Playing
- 2002–2006: Coca-Cola Tigers
- 2006–2007: Welcoat Dragons
- 2007–2008: Barangay Ginebra Kings
- 2008–2009: Talk 'N Text Tropang Texters
- 2009: Smart Pampanga Buddies
- 2009–2010: Barako Bull Energy Boosters
- 2010–2013: Talk 'N Text Tropang Texters

Coaching
- 2013–2019: FEU (assistant)
- 2016–2018: TNT KaTropa (assistant)
- 2019–2021: Blackwater Elite / Blackwater Bossing (assistant)
- 2021–present: Adamson (assistant)
- 2026–present: Benilde (assistant)

Career highlights
- As player: 5x PBA champion (2009 Philippine, 2011 Philippine, 2011 Commissioner's, 2012 Philippine, 2013 Philippine); As assistant coach: AsiaBasket champion (2025 International); PCCL champion (2015); UAAP Senior's champion (2015)

Gilbert Y. Lao (born September 13, 1978) is a Filipino former professional basketball player and coach in the Philippine Basketball Association (PBA). He was nicknamed "the Enforcer" in his college days.

== Draft ==
Lao was drafted by Coca-Cola Tigers in 2002, 11th overall.

With the Texters, he was able to win 5 titles as a pro with the team.

== PBA career statistics ==
Legend
GP	Games played	MPG	Minutes per game
FG%	Field-goal percentage	3P%	3-point field-goal percentage	FT%	Free-throw percentage
RPG	Rebounds per game	APG	Assists per game	SPG	Steals per game
BPG	Blocks per game	PPG	Points per game	**Bold**	Career high

=== Season-by-season averages ===
Year	Team	GP	MPG	FG%	3P%	FT%	RPG	APG	SPG	BPG	PPG
2002	Coca-Cola	8	2.0	**.667**	—	—	.4	.1	.0	.0	.5
2003	Coca-Cola	1	1.0	—	—	—	.0	.0	.0	.0	.0
2004–05	Coca-Cola	26	7.9	.323	.000	.632	1.5	.4	.1	.2	1.2
2005–06	Coca-Cola	5	2.4	.333	—	—	.2	.0	.0	.0	.4
2006–07	Welcoat	**35**	**12.0**	.544	.000	.440	1.4	.5	.2	.1	2.1
2007–08	Barangay Ginebra	13	7.2	.182	.000	.400	1.4	.2	**.3**	.2	.6
2007–08	Talk 'N Text	13	7.2	.182	.000	.400	1.4	.2	**.3**	.2	.6
2008–09	Talk 'N Text	19	3.4	.000	—	—	.6	.2	.1	.2	.0
2009–10	Barako Energy Coffee	16	**23.3**	.346	**.219**	.312	**3.4**	**1.3**	**.3**	**.5**	**3.0**
2009–10	Talk 'N Text	16	**23.3**	.346	**.219**	.312	**3.4**	**1.3**	**.3**	**.5**	**3.0**
2010–11	Talk 'N Text	25	3.5	.500	.000	**1.000**	.6	.2	.1	.0	.2
2011–12	Talk 'N Text	20	3.5	.500	—	.500	.5	.1	.1	.1	.3
Career		168	8.0	.410	.189	.474	1.2	.4	.2	.4	1.1

== Coaching career ==
Lao is an assistant coach of the Adamson Soaring Falcons in the University Athletic Association of the Philippines (UAAP).
