= Paul Harris (basketball) =

American basketball player (born 1986)

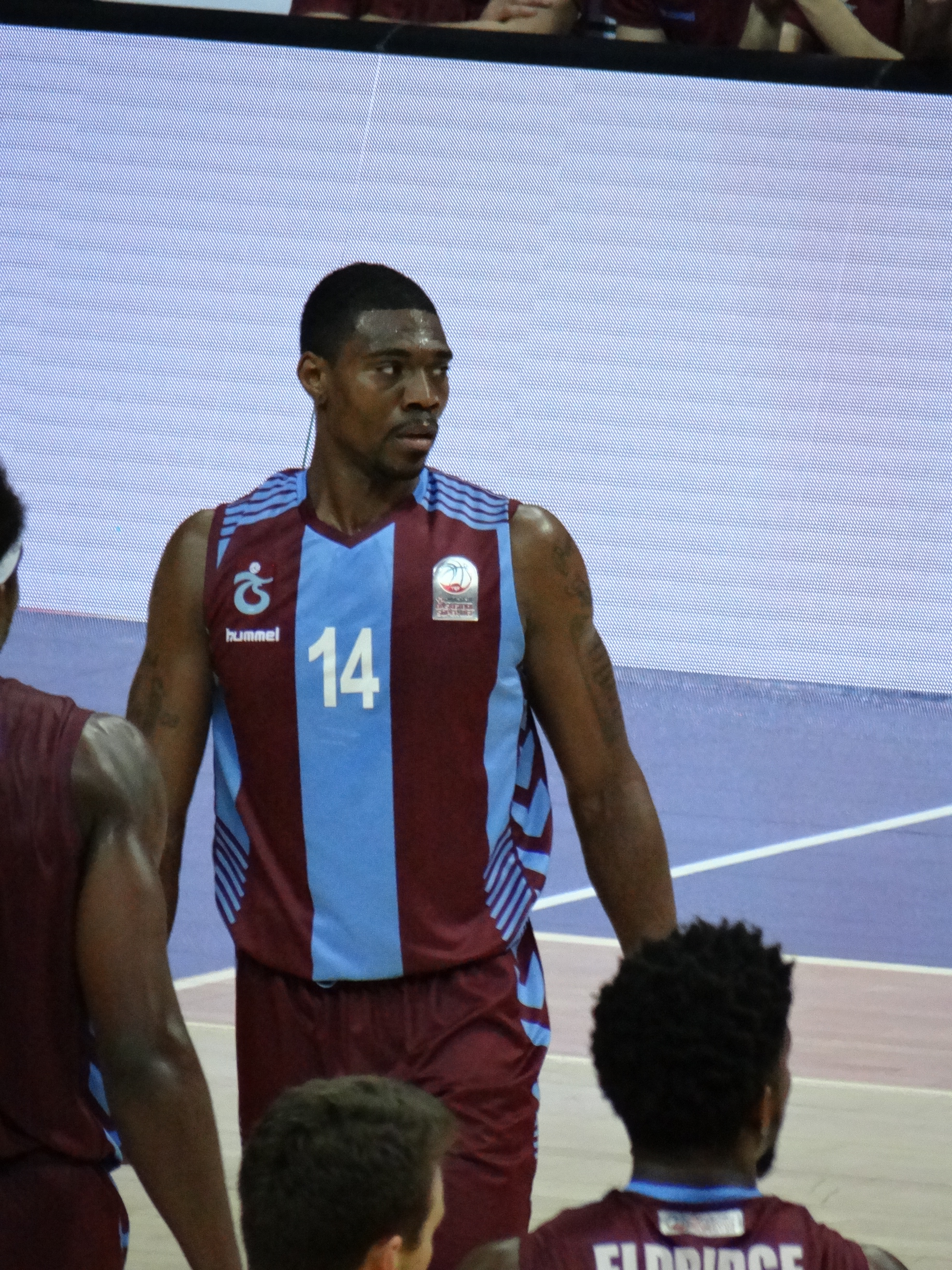

Personal information
- Born: October 15, 1986 (age 40) Niagara Falls, New York, U.S.
- Listed height: 6 ft 5 in (1.96 m)
- Listed weight: 230 lb (104 kg)

Career information
- High school: Niagara Falls (Niagara Falls, New York); Notre Dame Prep (Fitchburg, Massachusetts)
- College: Syracuse (2006–2009)
- NBA draft: 2009: undrafted
- Playing career: 2009–2021
- Position: Small forward
- Number: 14

Career history
- 2010–2011: Maine Red Claws
- 2011: Talk 'N Text Tropang Texters
- 2011–2012: Maine Red Claws
- 2012: Iowa Energy
- 2012: Talk 'N Text Tropang Texters
- 2012–2013: Iowa Energy
- 2013–2014: SLUC Nancy
- 2014: Talk 'N Text Tropang Texters
- 2014: Royal Halı Gaziantep
- 2014–2015: BCM Gravelines
- 2015–2016: Uşak Sportif
- 2016: Barangay Ginebra San Miguel
- 2016–2017: Vanoli Cremona
- 2017–2018: Trabzonspor
- 2018–2019: Le Portel
- 2021: Samsunspor
- 2021: Phoenix Super LPG Fuel Masters

Career highlights
- PBA champion (2011 Commissioners')

Paul Harris (born October 15, 1986) is an American professional basketball player who last played for the Phoenix Super LPG Fuel Masters of the Philippine Basketball Association (PBA). He played college basketball for Syracuse University.

== High school ==
Harris led Niagara Falls High School to the 2005 New York State Class AA Championship averaging 19.7 points, 12.6 rebounds and 5.0 assists per game. He was recognized as the tournament MVP after scoring 19 points, along with eight rebounds and four assists in the championship game, overcoming a broken thumb in his shooting hand in the process.

Harris was named first-team all-state in 2005 as Niagara Falls finished 28–1 and third in the national USA Today rankings. He scored 24 points to lead the West to a 110–77 victory against the East in the 2005 Niagara PAL/ACE Showcase game in April and had 16 points for the Black Jerseys in the 2006 Jordan All-American Classic.

Harris found himself in trouble off the court, however, facing minor drug and domestic violence charges for which he spent 13 days in jail.

Harris transferred to Notre Dame Prep in Massachusetts. While at Notre Dame Prep, Harris scored 31 points against Northfield Mount Herman, 26 points and 14 rebounds versus Blair Academy and 25 points against Winchendon School. He was a second-team member of the 2006 All-USA squad selected by USA Today. He played with a number of well-known players while in high school, including future Syracuse teammate Jonny Flynn, Michael Beasley and Lazar Hayward.

In 2009 as The Buffalo News celebrated 50 years of All-Western New York (WNY) basketball selections, Harris, who was twice an All-WNY first team selection was named to the All-time All-WNY team along with Curtis Aiken, Christian Laettner, Bob Lanier and Mel Montgomery.

=== Team USA ===
Harris was a member of the USA Basketball Youth Development Festival squad that captured the gold medal at the 2005 International Sports Invitational. Harris tallied 28 points in the gold-medal game and led the seven-team field in rebounding average (9.0) and ranked fifth in scoring average (16.8).

The following year, Harris played in the 2006 Nike Hoop Summit game between the USA Junior Select Team and the World Select Team. He had a team-high seven rebounds and six assists, as well as six points in the 109–91 victory.

== College ==
=== 2006–07 ===
Harris was named the 2006–07 Big East preseason Rookie of the Year, and made his Syracuse University debut in an exhibition victory against Bryant University on November 1. In his first six games, Harris averaged 12.0 points and 8.3 rebounds. He finished the season averaging 8.6 points and 7.1 rebounds. At the end of the season, Harris was selected to the Big East All Rookie Team.

=== 2007–08 ===
Harris improved his statistics across the board during his sophomore campaign and was rewarded with second-team All Big East honors. He averaged 14.5 points, 8.2 rebounds, 3.3 assists, and 1.7 steals per game. His shooting touch improved tremendously as his field goal percentage and free throw shooting increased 3.6 and 4.9 percentage points respectively. His mid/long range game appeared much more polished; Harris saw his 3-point percentage skyrocket from 5% to a respectable 32.4%.

=== 2008–09 ===
In his final season at Syracuse, Harris averaged 12 points and led the team with 8.1 rebounds.

On December 30, 2008, Harris injured his finger against Seton Hall and needed six stitches. He missed the following game against South Florida. In Syracuse's 127–117 win against Connecticut in the quarterfinals of the Big East Tournament on March 12, 2009, Harris played 56 minutes, scored 29 points and grabbed 22 rebounds.

== Professional career ==
After the conclusion of the 2008–09 season, Harris declared himself eligible for the 2009 NBA draft. He was not drafted, but played alongside Jonny Flynn as a member of the Minnesota Timberwolves' summer league team. After not being offered a spot on the Timberwolves' preseason roster, the Utah Jazz invited Harris to attend their preseason training camp. However, Harris injured his ankle the week before camp began and didn't heal in time to participate and was then waived by the Jazz on October 22.

On November 5, 2009, Harris was drafted by the Maine Red Claws with the eighth overall pick of the 2009 NBA Development League Draft. However, Harris didn't attend camp, instead opting for season ending ankle surgery.

Harris joined the Utah Jazz for the 2010 Orlando Pro Summer League. On October 30, 2010, he was re-acquired by the Red Claws. In January 2011, Harris, citing a lack of playing time with the Red Claws, left the team and accepted an offer to join the Talk 'N Text Tropang Texters of the Philippine Basketball Association (PBA). The Tropang Texters won the 2011 PBA Commissioner's Cup 4–2 over the Barangay Ginebra Kings.

In November 2011, he was again re-acquired by the Red Claws. On February 29, 2012, he was waived by the Red Claws. On March 27, 2012, he was acquired by the Iowa Energy. However, on April 12, his contract was terminated by the Energy. In December 2012, Harris was re-acquired by the Iowa Energy.

In August 2013, he signed a one-year contract with SLUC Nancy Basket of France.

On June 3, 2014, he signed to play as an import for the Talk 'N Text Tropang Texters for the third time of the PBA.

On June 12, 2014, he signed with Royal Halı Gaziantep of Turkey. On December 23, 2014, he left Gaziantep and signed with BCM Gravelines of the French LNB Pro A.

On June 1, 2015, Harris signed with Uşak Sportif of the Turkish Basketball League for the 2015–16 season.

In June 2016, Harris signed with Barangay Ginebra San Miguel of the Philippines, marking his fourth time to play in the country. He replaced Drew Crawford, who backed out at the last minute. However, he only played one game against GlobalPort after he suffered a hypextended thumb open fracture during the third quarter.

Harris signed with the Italian team Vanoli Cremona on November 9, 2016.

In 2021, Harris signed with Phoenix Super LPG Fuel Masters of the PBA. In his first game with the Fuel Masters, he recorded 24 points, 15 rebounds and 3 assists in a 103–100 victory over the Terrafirma Dyip.

== See also ==
- 2006 high school boys basketball All-Americans
