= Larry Fonacier =

Filipino basketball player (born 1982)

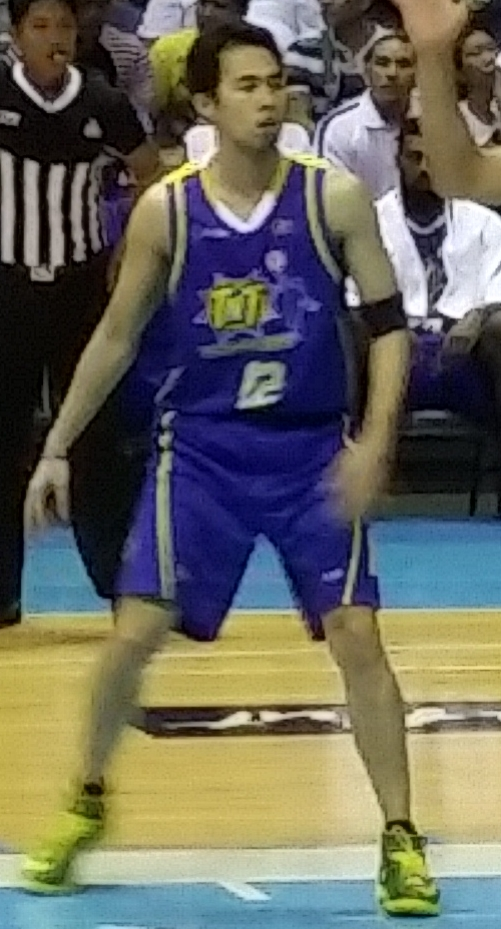
- Fonacier with TNT in 2015

Personal information
- Born: May 13, 1982 (age 44) Quezon City, Philippines
- Listed height: 6 ft 2 in (1.88 m)
- Listed weight: 170 lb (77 kg)

Career information
- High school: Ateneo (Quezon City)
- College: Ateneo (2000–2004)
- PBA draft: 2005: 2nd round, 14th overall pick
- Drafted by: Red Bull Barako
- Playing career: 2005–2022
- Position: Shooting guard / small forward
- Number: 12, 13

Career history
- 2005–2007: Red Bull Barako
- 2007–2008: Magnolia Beverage Masters
- 2008–2010: Alaska Aces
- 2010–2017: Talk 'N Text Tropang Texters / TNT Tropang Texters / Tropang TNT / TNT KaTropa
- 2017–2022: NLEX Road Warriors

Career highlights
- 7× PBA champion (2005–06 Fiesta, 2010 Fiesta, 2010–11 Philippine, 2011 Commissioner's, 2011–12 Philippine, 2012–13 Philippine, 2015 Commissioner's); PBA Finals MVP (2011–12 Philippine); 3× PBA All-Star (2007, 2013, 2014); PBA Rookie of the Year (2006); PBA All-Rookie Team (2006); PBA Mr. Quality Minutes (2012); UAAP champion (2002); UAAP Finals MVP (2002)

Larry Alexander Nacua Fonacier (born May 13, 1982) is a Filipino former professional basketball player. He previously served as the team manager for the NLEX Road Warriors of the Philippine Basketball Association (PBA). He was drafted fourteenth overall by the Red Bull Barako in the 2005 PBA draft. Nicknamed the "Babyface Assassin", he became known as a reliable three-point shooter and reliable defender.

== Early life ==
Fonacier is the first-born son of the family, and he was an only child until his younger sister was born. Since he was an only child, he socialized by playing basketball. His father played tennis, so when he was five years old, he learned to shoot by trying to shoot tennis balls into a small makeshift rim. At night, he watched PBA games, especially those of his favorite team Purefoods. While watching games on television, he tried his best to copy the moves of his favorite player, Alvin Patrimonio, and dutifully wrote down Patrimonio's stats on his school notebook. He also participated in camps held by the Milo BEST (Basketball Efficiency and Scientific Training) Center.

== High school and college career ==
Larry first played for the Ateneo de Manila High School Blue Eaglets in the University Athletic Association of the Philippines Juniors Basketball division, leading them to numerous winning seasons and championships along with Enrico Villanueva, Wesley Gonzales, BJ Manalo, and Bajjie del Rosario. He was named the UAAP Juniors MVP in 1999 as Ateneo swept the competition 14–0. He moved to the college ranks the following year.

In his rookie year, under coach Joe Lipa, he played consistent minutes coming off the bench. The Blue Eagles managed to secure a twice to beat advantage against the Far Eastern University Tamaraws. Despite having the twice to beat advantage, they were defeated in both games. The Eagles would have faced the De La Salle Green Archers in a best-of-3 finals.

The following year, in 2001, Larry started in all of the games and played a significant role in the team. The team finished with 10 wins and 4 losses. They, again, secured a twice to beat advantage against the Far Eastern University Tamaraws. They defeated Far Eastern University Tamaraws 67–63 then faced the De La Salle Green Archers in the best-of-3 finals. The Eagles lost in Game 3 despite a 30-point game from freshman LA Tenorio. The score was 93–88.

During the summer, the Ateneo-Hapee team joined the commercial and amateur Philippine Basketball League and won the championship under coach Joel Banal. At the start of the 65th season of the UAAP, with a championship caliber coach in Banal, the Ateneo de Manila community had very high hopes of finally ending the 14-year drought. Fonacier scored 14 points (including eight points with back-to-back threes in overtime) to lead the team to a win over FEU. The Eagles ended with 4 wins and 3 losses in the first round of the tournament, but lost their next two games, giving them a record of 4 wins and 5 losses. Most of the Ateneo community had lost hope. The Eagles, however, pulled off 5 straight wins, to end the elimination round with 9 wins and 5 losses and claim third seed. Furthermore, they spoiled the De La Salle Green Archers chances of sweeping the 14 game eliminations, which would have given them an outright berth in the championship round. Larry scored 15 points and grabbed 6 rebounds in that 76–63 win over the Green Archers. The Eagles would then face the UE Red Warriors. The team won both games and faced the De La Salle Green Archers in the finals in a best of 3 series. In game 1, Larry scored 11 points and had two crucial blocks against Mark Cardona in the game's dying seconds. In game 2, Larry scored his college career high of 25 points but lost the game by 8 points. In game 3, Larry scored only 6 points because of food poisoning, but the team finally ended the 14 title year drought winning the UAAP Men's Basketball Championship with the score of 77–70. Larry was named co-Finals MVP, along with Wesley Gonzales, averaging 11.7 points per game.

In 2003, Fonacier scored 18 points in a win over the UST Tigers. He then had 15 points (with eight in the clutch), nine rebounds, and five assists against UE as Ateneo stretched its win streak that season to six. He missed their next game (which was against the NU Bulldogs) due to a fractured nose bridge he sustained in team practice, and Ateneo lost. That season, the Blue Eagles made it to the finals but lost to the FEU Tamaraws.

In 2004, Larry's last year, he only played 4 games in that season. He suffered an ACL injury on his left knee while driving to the basket in the fourth game against UP that ended his UAAP career. The team and the Ateneo community rallied behind him, as they held a mass at the Ateneo chapel. That season, Ateneo swept the first round of eliminations, but were eliminated once again by La Salle.

== Professional career ==
=== Red Bull Barako (2005–2007) ===
Before entering the PBA, Fonacier continued to rehab from his ACL injury, and took master's classes in communications. He then applied for the 2005 PBA Draft. He was then selected by Red Bull Barako with the 14th pick.

In his rookie season, Fonacier helped Red Bull win a Fiesta Conference championship. In the next conference, the Philippine Cup, he helped Red Bull reach the finals, where they lost to the Purefoods Chunkee Giants in six games. He won the PBA Rookie of the Year award during the 2005–06 season. This made him the lowest picked player in PBA history to win the award, until Aaron Black broke the record.

In a 92–89 loss to the Air21 Express during the 2006–07 season, Fonacier had a chance to make a game-winning play, but his pass was stolen by Yancy de Ocampo. During that time, he was named as an All-Star, and played for the North All-Stars team in the 2007 PBA All-Star Weekend. He also participated in that year's Three-Point Shootout.

=== Magnolia Beverage Masters (2007–2008) ===
Fonacier was then traded to the Magnolia Beverage Masters. There, he split time with Lordy Tugade, Chris Calaguio, and former Ateneo teammate Wesley Gonzales on a team that was in "win-now" mode.

=== Alaska Aces (2008–2010) ===
After some games with Magnolia, he was then dealt to the Alaska Aces with his teammate LA Tenorio in exchange for Ken Bono and Mike Cortez. It was expected that he would be given the same role Alaska legend Jojo Lastimosa used to have with the team. He had to master Coach Tim Cone's triangle offense and come off the bench, which took some time to adjust for him.

In a win over the Coca-Cola Tigers during the 2008–09 Philippine Cup, Fonacier scored 13 points with three three-point shots. Alaska made it to the finals, where in Game 5, he recorded 15 points and six rebounds. However, they lost their next two games, and the Talk 'N Text Tropang Texters became champions.

=== TNT Franchise (2010–2017) ===
==== 2010–11 season ====
During the 2010 PBA Draft, he was traded by the Aces to the Talk 'N Text Tropang Texters in exchange for the draft rights of Elmer Espiritu. This was done because Talk 'N Text had just traded away Mac Cardona. He was able to contribute as Talk 'N Text won the 2010–11 Philippine Cup. He then had clutch free throws in a win over the Meralco Bolts during the 2011 Commissioner's Cup. The Tropang Texters won the Commissioner's Cup finals in six games. During the Governors' Cup, he had a career-high 27 points on 8-of-11 shooting from three in a win over the Powerade Tigers. For that performance, he won Player of the Week. The Texters topped the elimination round, but lost to the Petron Blaze Boosters in seven games in the finals.

==== 2011–12 season ====
In the Game 1 of their Philippine Cup semis against Petron, Fonacier scored half of his 22 points in the fourth quarter, and made two clutch free throws to secure the win. From there, they lost their next three games and went down 3–1, but they overcame that deficit and defeated Petron. Talk 'N Text beat the Powerade Tigers in the 2011–12 Philippine Cup finals and he was chosen as Finals MVP. They made the finals once again in the Commissioner's Cup, but lost to the B-Meg Llamados in seven games. He won the Mr. Quality Minutes award that season for his valuable contributions off the bench and leading the team in minutes played.

==== 2012–13 season ====
Talk 'N Text started the 2012–13 season 4–0, with them getting their fourth win by Fonacier scoring 18 of his 26 points in the first half and hitting clutch shots in the fourth to go along with seven rebounds against the San Mig Coffee Mixers. They got their fifth straight win with him scoring seven of his 12 points in the fourth quarter against the Rain or Shine Elasto Painters. Their streak ended at the hands of Alaska when he missed a shot that could have sent that game into overtime. Against Barangay Ginebra, he had 16 points, but fouled out of the game as Ginebra managed to hang on for the win. The Texters made it to the semifinals against Alaska where in Game 3, he had 21 points after not making any three pointers in the first two games. They managed to beat Alaska to return to the finals. From there, they swept Rain or Shine in four games. This championship was sweeter for Fonacier, as this was Coach Norman Black's first conference with TNT, and he was able to share this championship with multiple coaches from his time at Ateneo.

In the 2013 Commissioner's Cup, Fonacier had 18 points in a win over Petron. He then went on a shooting slump in his next nine games as he averaged 4.4 points on 22% shooting from the field. He also played in the All-Star Game during the 2013 All-Star Weekend as a member of Gilas Pilipinas. After his stint with Gilas, he returned for the 2013 Governors' Cup, in which he had 19 points in a win over the Globalport Batang Pier. They didn't qualify for the playoffs that conference, as they lost to Ginebra in the eighth seed playoff.

==== 2013–14 season ====
In the 2014 Commissioner's Cup, Fonacier had 16 points with four three-pointers in a win over the Barako Bull Energy as Talk 'N Text started the conference with four straight wins. He followed that up with 14 points in a win over Meralco. Heading into the All-Star break, the Texters were 7–0. He then participated in the Three-Point Shootout during the 2014 All-Star Weekend and was an All-Star playing for Gilas once again.

==== 2014–15 season ====
In the 2014–15 Philippine Cup, Fonacier had 11 points with back to back threes at the end of the third quarter in a win over Barako. In a close Commissioner's Cup game against NLEX in which they were up by one with eight seconds remaining, he called a timeout even though the team didn't have one. NLEX import Al Thornton tied the game on a technical free throw, but Fonacier's teammate Jayson Castro won the game for Talk 'N Text with a pull-up jumper. Talk 'N Text won the Commissioner's Cup title that season. In the Governors' Cup, he scored a season-high 20 points in a win over the Blackwater Elite.

==== 2015–16 season ====
During the offseason, Fonacier re-signed a three-year deal to stay with Talk 'N Text for three more years. The Texters got their first win of the season when he contributed 11 points against the Mahindra Enforcer. He then had 16 in a win over Blackwater. In the 2016 Commissioner's Cup, he missed a game against NLEX due to sickness. They lost to Alaska in a best-of-three quarterfinal series in that conference, despite 19 points from him in Game 3. They then started the Governors' Cup with six straight wins, but lost to Mahindra despite 13 points from him in that game. In a win over Globalport, he had 14 points and a crucial offensive rebound that allowed Ranidel de Ocampo to make the game-winning shot for TNT. He then had a season-high 21 points in 32 minutes off the bench to go along with seven rebounds, two assists, and a steal as they increased their record to 9–1. TNT made it to the semifinals against Meralco where in Game 3, he had 20 points, but Meralco took the series lead 2–1. They lost the next game, and Meralco moved on to the Governors' Cup finals.

==== 2016–17 season ====
In a 2016–17 Philippine Cup game, Fonacier had 15 points as they got their first win of the season over Ginebra. He then had 16 points on four triples along with four boards, one assist, and one steal in 28 minutes in a win over Alaska. With a new head coach in Nash Racela, he enjoyed a career resurgence as in their first five games of the conference, he averaged 10.8 points built around 2.2 triples, three rebounds, 1.4 assists, and 0.8 steal in 27.3 minutes. TNT finished the elimination round with a record of 6–5. In Game 1 of their quarterfinals series against Globalport, he had 17 points and went five of nine from distance. They moved on to the semis against the San MIguel Beermen, where in a Game 4 loss, he had a team-high 15 points. However, he was given a rare technical foul for 'disrespectfully addressing the referee' just when the team was at the height of a fourth quarter rally. He led the team with 14 points in a Game 7 loss, and the Beermen moved on to the finals.

Fonacier also competed once again in the Three-Point Shootout during the 2017 All-Star Week. In his final game with TNT, he had 14 points on 5-of-10 shooting, with four of his shots coming from beyond-the-arc.

=== NLEX Road Warriors (2017–2022) ===
==== 2016–17 season ====
In a four-team trade, Fonacier went from playing for TNT to playing for the NLEX Road Warriors. TNT gained Anthony Semerad and a first round pick from Globalport. With NLEX, he reunited with his former head coach from Red Bull, Coach Guiao, and assumed the role of a veteran for the young NLEX team. He didn't play for NLEX in the 2017 Commissioner's Cup, as he had undergone surgery for bone spurs and with NLEX not in the playoffs, had no need to rush his recovery.

In the 2017 Governors' Cup, he had 12 points in a win over Ginebra. He then had 16 points, seven boards, two assists, two steals, and only one turnover in 30 minutes in an upset win over Meralco. NLEX then clinched a spot in the quarterfinals with a 103–100 win over SMB as he logged 16 points, four rebounds, three assists, two blocks, and one steal in 29 minutes. He stepped up in the clutch, as he made two clutch triples, inbounded the ball that led to free throws for JR Quiñahan, and blocked Alex Cabagnot's attempt to send the game into overtime. With his performance in that game, he earned a PBA Press Corps Player of the Week citation. In the quarterfinals, they lost to the Star Hotshots.

==== 2017–18 season ====
During the 2017–18 Philippine Cup, Fonacier had 12 points, including a four-point play that gave NLEX a four-point lead that eventually led to the win over the Kia Picanto. He had 12 again in a Christmas Day win over Globalport. They had their first loss of the season against the Phoenix Fuel Masters despite him scoring a team-high 22 points. NLEX lost three more games after that, but they were able to stop the losing streak with a win over Ginebra in which he produced 17 points on 7-of-12 shooting. Then he contributed 17 points, six rebounds, and one block while also going 4-of-4 from three as Kiefer Ravena made the game-winning jumper over the Bolts. In a win over the Aces, he, Kevin Alas, and Raul Soyud combined for 45 points. They faced Alaska again in the quarterfinals where in Game 1, he had 18 points and nine rebounds. From there, they moved on to the semifinals where they lost to the Hotshots in five games.

In the 2018 Commissioner's Cup, Fonacier had an all-around performance of 12 points, seven boards, and six assists in a win over the Columbian Dyip. He also competed once again in the Three-Point Shootout during the 2018 All-Star Week. He then had 14 points in a loss to his former team TNT. He was then ruled out for the rest of the Commissioner's Cup after a collision in mid-air with Ginebra's Jervy Cruz led to a bruised rib and a collapsed lung.

Fonacier made his return in the first game of the Governors' Cup against TNT. In that game, he had 17 points and the win, making 50% of his 10 shots from the field. In NLEX's first three games, he had led NLEX to a 2–1 record despite the absence of Coach Guiao, multiple injured players, and him not at full strength. He then led the team to another win, this time over the Dyip. In NLEX's win over Blackwater, Coach Guiao returned, NLEX snapped Blackwater's four-game winning streak, and he scored 24 points on 8-of-13 shooting. He then led NLEX with 21 points in losses to Ginebra and Meralco. That conference, they lost to Ginebra in the first round.

==== 2019–2022: Final seasons with NLEX ====
In the 2019 season, Fonacier played in less games. This was mostly due to an injury. On April 4, 2019, he was reactivated. He scored seven points in a loss to the Batang Pier.

In 2020, Fonacier didn't join the team in the PBA bubble as his wife had health issues. He still attended team meetings and workouts and also assisted the coaching staff.

Fonacier rejoined NLEX the following year. He skipped the 2021 Philippine Cup for personal reasons. He was then assigned to NLEX's 3x3 team, the Cavitex Braves.

In 2022, Fonacier was reactivated by NLEX at the start of the 2022–23 PBA season. In his final conference, he played in seven games and averaged 1.2 points as the Road Warriors didn't make the playoffs. His contract expired on December 31, 2022, and he did not renew his contract.

== National team career ==
Fonacier began playing for the Philippine team in 2006, when the team participated in the Al-Emadi International Basketball Championship. They finished 4th in that tournament.

In 2012, Fonacier participated in the 2012 Jones Cup with a team mostly composed of PBA pros. The Philippine team won that tournament. He also played in the 2012 FIBA Asia Cup. In that tournament, they lost to Qatar and settled for fourth place. They went on to win the silver medal

In 2013, Fonacier was part of the team that played in the 2013 FIBA Asia Championship. His best game was in a loss to Chinese Taipei, in which he had a team-high 21 points with five three-pointers. They went on to win the silver medal in that tournament.

The following year, Fonacier begged off from the national pool, as he had been playing through multiple back and foot injuries and needed to rehab.

== Player profile ==
Fonacier is known as a reliable shooter. As early as college, he began developing a reputation as a clutch shooter with his threes and free throws. He also employed a running jumper in his offensive arsenal when defenses close in on him too tight.

Fonacier is also very versatile on defense, as he used his length and defensive fundamentals. Talk 'N Text often used him to guard the best player on the opposing team. In college, he was capable of blocking shots. With his offense and defense, this makes him an all-around skilled player.

When he was younger, Fonacier would get mad at teammates when they didn't match his competitiveness. Over the years, he developed his leadership skills, emphasizing teamwork and sacrifice. He rarely got emotional in games and didn't engage in trash talk. These qualities served him well as he became one of TNT's leaders and transitioned into the role of a veteran for NLEX.

== Career statistics ==
Legend
GP	Games played	MPG	Minutes per game
FG%	Field-goal percentage	3P%	3-point field-goal percentage	FT%	Free-throw percentage
RPG	Rebounds per game	APG	Assists per game	SPG	Steals per game
BPG	Blocks per game	PPG	Points per game	**Bold**	Career high

=== PBA season-by-season averages ===
Year	Team	GP	MPG	FG%	3P%	FT%	RPG	APG	SPG	BPG	PPG
2005–06	Red Bull	**65**	21.5	.421	.380	.809	3.6	2.2	.3	.1	8.0
2006–07	Red Bull	55	21.0	.438	.396	.761	3.4	2.0	.3	.1	9.9
2007–08	Magnolia	29	16.6	.376	.370	.731	2.5	1.4	.2	.0	5.6
2007–08	Alaska	29	16.6	.376	.370	.731	2.5	1.4	.2	.0	5.6
2008–09	Alaska	47	13.1	.383	.313	.774	1.6	1.0	.3	.1	4.8
2009–10	Alaska	54	15.2	.330	.336	.809	1.8	1.7	.2	.0	4.8
2010–11	Talk 'N Text	**65**	25.6	.378	.358	.796	3.8	1.8	.6	.2	9.3
2011–12	Talk 'N Text	62	29.9	.408	**.398**	.801	4.2	1.7	.4	.1	10.5
2012–13	Talk 'N Text	54	30.0	.382	.319	.789	**4.3**	2.6	**.7**	.2	10.4
2013–14	Talk 'N Text	49	27.0	.375	.321	.875	3.5	1.7	.5	.1	8.4
2014–15	Talk 'N Text	51	**31.5**	.397	.354	.836	4.2	1.9	.6	**.3**	8.1
2015–16	TNT	39	26.4	.419	.375	.797	3.1	1.9	.6	.1	8.9
2016–17	TNT	39	27.9	.379	.335	.809	3.0	2.1	.6	.2	9.0
2016–17	NLEX	39	27.9	.379	.335	.809	3.0	2.1	.6	.2	9.0
2017–18	NLEX	38	27.2	**.444**	.365	.818	4.1	**2.8**	**.7**	**.3**	**10.8**
2019	NLEX	23	16.4	.294	.229	**.882**	2.2	1.2	**.7**	.1	4.0
2022–23	NLEX	13	11.6	.243	.200	—	1.1	.5	.2	.1	1.9
Career		683	23.7	.393	.352	.803	3.3	1.9	.5	.1	8.2

=== National team statistics ===
Year	Team	GP	MPG	FG%	3P%	FT%	RPG	APG	SPG	BPG	PPG
2012 William Jones Cup	Smart Gilas	8	16.8	.273	.304	.80	2.3	1.3	.4	0	6.4
2013 FIBA Asia Championship	Smart Gilas	9	16.2	.361	.350	1.000	1.7	1.2	.3	0	5.4

== Off the court ==
In 2014, Fonacier and LA Tenorio appeared on an episode of Who Wants to Be a Millionaire? He also appeared in a TNT commercial with teammates Jayson Castro and Ranidel de Ocampo. Since 2022, he is currently an analyst for the TV5 broadcast of UAAP basketball.

=== Career as team manager ===
On January 7, 2023, NLEX announced that Fonacier had retired and that he would stay with the team as its team manager.

== Personal life ==
Fonacier is married and they have two sons. He is a devoted Christian. After suffering an ACL tear in college, he turned his life around and started to have a life of faith in Jesus. He has attended Bible studies led by Dylan Ababou.

Fonacier is known as a quiet person who rarely got into trouble. He isn't active on social media, but has spoken up on political issues, such as when he posted his thoughts about the Anti-Terrorism Bill.
