= 2011 PBA Commissioner's Cup =

Second conference of the 2010–11 PBA season

- Duration: February 18 – May 8, 2011
- TV partner(s): Solar Sports (Studio 23); Basketball TV (Local); The Filipino Channel (International)

Finals
- Champions: Talk 'N Text Tropang Texters
- Runners-up: Barangay Ginebra Kings

Awards
- Best Player: Jimmy Alapag (Talk 'N Text Tropang Texters)
- Best Import: Nate Brumfield (Barangay Ginebra Kings)
- Finals MVP: Jayson Castro & Jimmy Alapag (Talk 'N Text Tropang Texters)

PBA Commissioner's Cup chronology
- < 2002 2012 >

PBA conference chronology
- < 2010–11 Philippine 2011 Governors' >

The 2011 Philippine Basketball Association (PBA) Commissioner's Cup was the second conference of the 2010–11 PBA season. The tournament began on February 18 and ended on May 8, 2011. The tournament was an import-laden format, which requires an import or a pure-foreign player for each team and with a height limit of 6-foot-4. Defending 2002 champions Barako Bull Energy Boosters took a leave of absence during this conference. Replacing them was the Smart Gilas Philippine national team.

The Talk 'N Text Tropang Texters won their fourth and first back-to-back championship, defeating the Barangay Ginebra Kings, 4–2.

== Format ==
The following format was observed for the duration of the conference:

- Single-round robin eliminations; 9 games per team; Teams are then seeded by basis on win–loss records. Ties are broken among points differences of the tied teams.
- The top two teams after the elimination round will automatically advance to the semifinals.
- The next four teams will play in a best of three quarterfinals series for the two last berths in the semifinals. Matchups are:
  - QF1: #3 team vs. #6 team
  - QF2: #4 team vs. #5 team
- The winners of the quarterfinals will challenge the top two teams in a best-of-five semifinals series. Matchups are:
  - SF1: #1 vs. QF2
  - SF2: #2 vs. QF1
- The winners in the semifinals advance to the best-of-seven finals.

== Elimination round ==
=== Team standings ===
Pos	Team	W	L	PCT	GB	Qualification
1	Talk 'N Text Tropang Texters	8	1	.889	—	Advance to semifinals
2	Smart Gilas (G)	7	2	.778	1	Advance to semifinals
3	Barangay Ginebra Kings	5	4	.556 (Note: Head-to-head differential: Barangay Ginebra +12, Air21 −4, Alaska −8)	3	Advance to quarterfinals
4	Air21 Express	5	4	.556	3	Advance to quarterfinals
5	Alaska Aces	5	4	.556	3	Advance to quarterfinals
6	Rain or Shine Elasto Painters	4	5	.444 (Note: Head-to-head record: Rain or Shine 1–0 B-Meg)	4	Advance to quarterfinals
7	B-Meg Derby Ace Llamados	4	5	.444	4	
8	Meralco Bolts	3	6	.333	5	
9	Powerade Tigers	2	7	.222 (Note: Head-to-head record: Powerade 1–0 San Miguel)	6	
10	San Miguel Beermen	2	7	.222	6	

Source: PBA.ph
(G) Guests

=== Schedule ===
Team ╲ Game	1	2	3	4	5	6	7	8	9
Air21	SMB	DAL	TNT	SG	BGK	ROS	MER	POW	ALA
Alaska	POW	BGK	SG	SMB	DAL	TNT	MER	ROS	A21
B-Meg Derby Ace	ROS	POW	A21	BGK	ALA	MER	SG	SMB	TNT
Barangay Ginebra	MER	ALA	DAL	POW	A21	SMB	ROS	SG	TNT
Meralco	BGK	ROS	SMB	TNT	DAL	POW	ALA	A21	SG
Powerade	ALA	DAL	TNT	ROS	BGK	SMB	MER	SG	A21
Rain or Shine	DAL	MER	PWT	TNT	SG	A21	BGK	ALA	SMB
San Miguel	A21	MER	ALA	SG	POW	BGK	TNT	DAL	ROS
Smart Gilas	TNT	ALA	A21	SMB	ROS	DAL	PWT	BGK	MER
Talk 'N Text	SG	PWT	A21	MER	ROS	ALA	SMB	DAL	BGK

= Win; = OT win; = Loss; = OT loss

== Bracket ==
Quarterfinals (Best-of-3)
4	Air21	2
5	Alaska	1
3	Barangay Ginebra	2
6	Rain or Shine	1

Semifinals (Best-of-5)
1	Talk 'N Text	3
4	Air21	0
2	Smart Gilas	1
3	Barangay Ginebra	3

Finals (Best-of-7)
1	Talk 'N Text	4
3	Barangay Ginebra	2

== Quarterfinals ==
=== (3) Barangay Ginebra vs. (6) Rain or Shine ===
April 8

Barangay Ginebra Kings 100, Rain or Shine Elasto Painters 91

Cuneta Astrodome, Pasay

April 10

Barangay Ginebra Kings 97, Rain or Shine Elasto Painters 113

Cuneta Astrodome, Pasay

April 13

Barangay Ginebra Kings 92, Rain or Shine Elasto Painters 82
Barangay Ginebra wins series, 2–1

Araneta Coliseum, Quezon City

=== (4) Air21 vs. (5) Alaska ===
April 8

Air21 Express 89, Alaska Aces 91

Cuneta Astrodome, Pasay

April 10

Air21 Express 94, Alaska Aces 84

Cuneta Astrodome, Pasay

April 13

Air21 Express 97, Alaska Aces 94
Air21 wins series, 2–1

Araneta Coliseum, Quezon City

== Semifinals ==
=== (1) Talk 'N Text vs. (4) Air21 ===
April 15

Talk 'N Text Tropang Texters 97, Air21 Express 90

Araneta Coliseum, Quezon City

April 17

Talk 'N Text Tropang Texters 114, Air21 Express 96

Araneta Coliseum, Quezon City

April 20

Talk 'N Text Tropang Texters 118, Air21 Express 104
Talk 'n Text wins series, 3–0

Araneta Coliseum, Quezon City

=== (2) Smart Gilas vs. (3) Barangay Ginebra ===
April 15

Smart Gilas 96, Barangay Ginebra Kings 97

Araneta Coliseum, Quezon City

April 17

Smart Gilas 103, Barangay Ginebra Kings 110

Araneta Coliseum, Quezon City

April 20

Smart Gilas 100, Barangay Ginebra Kings 88

Araneta Coliseum, Quezon City

April 24

Smart Gilas 85, Barangay Ginebra Kings 92
Brgy. Ginebra wins series, 3–1

Araneta Coliseum, Quezon City

== Finals ==
April 27

Talk 'N Text Tropang Texters 102, Barangay Ginebra Kings 83

Araneta Coliseum, Quezon City

April 29

Talk 'N Text Tropang Texters 106, Barangay Ginebra Kings 108

Cuneta Astrodome, Pasay

May 1

Talk 'N Text Tropang Texters 104, Barangay Ginebra Kings 88

Puerto Princesa Coliseum, Puerto Princesa

May 4

Talk 'N Text Tropang Texters 91, Barangay Ginebra Kings 84

Araneta Coliseum, Quezon City

May 6

Talk 'N Text Tropang Texters 93, Barangay Ginebra Kings 100

Araneta Coliseum, Quezon City

May 8

Talk 'N Text Tropang Texters 99, Barangay Ginebra Kings 96 (OT)
Talk 'n Text wins series, 4–2

Araneta Coliseum, Quezon City

== Imports ==
The following is the list of imports, which had played for their respective teams at least once, with the returning imports in italics. Highlighted are the imports who stayed with their respective teams for the whole conference.

Team	Name	Debuted	Last game	Record
Air21 Express	(United States) Geremy Robinson	February 25 (vs. San Miguel)	March 5 (vs. Talk 'N Text)	1-2
Air21 Express	(Libya) Alpha Bangura	March 9 (vs. Smart Gilas)	April 20 (vs. Talk 'N Text)	6-6
Alaska Aces	(United States) LD Williams	February 23 (vs. Powerade)	April 13 (vs. Air21)	6-6
B-Meg Derby Ace Llamados	(United States) Rob Brown	February 23 (vs. Rain or Shine)	February 23 (vs. Rain or Shine)	0-1
B-Meg Derby Ace Llamados	(United States) Shamari Spears	February 26 (vs. Powerade)	March 23 (vs. Smart Gilas)	3-3
B-Meg Derby Ace Llamados	(United States) Courtney Beasley	March 27 (vs. San Miguel)	April 1 (vs. Talk 'N Text)	1-1
Barangay Ginebra Kings	(United States) Nate Brumfield	February 18 (vs. Meralco)	May 8 (vs. Talk 'N Text)	12-10
Meralco Bolts	(United States) Anthony Danridge	February 18 (vs. Barangay Ginebra)	March 4 (vs. San Miguel)	0-3
Meralco Bolts	(Nigeria) Chamberlain Oguchi	March 11 (vs. Talk 'N Text)	April 2 (vs. Smart Gilas)	3-3
Powerade Tigers	(United States) Russell Carter	February 23 (vs. Alaska)	March 11 (vs. Barangay Ginebra)	1-4
Powerade Tigers	(United States) Martin Zeno	March 16 (vs. San Miguel)	April 3 (vs. Air21)	1-3
Rain or Shine Elasto Painters	(United States) Hassan Adams	February 23 (vs. B-Meg Derby Ace)	April 13 (vs. Barangay Ginebra)	5-7
San Miguel Beermen	(United States) Ira Brown	February 25 (vs. Air21)	March 4 (vs. Meralco)	1-1
San Miguel Beermen	(United States) David Young	March 9 (vs. Alaska)	April 6 (vs. Rain or Shine)	1-6
Talk 'N Text Tropang Texters	(United States) Paul Harris	February 25 (vs. Smart Gilas)	May 8 (vs. Barangay Ginebra)	15-3

== Awards ==
=== Conference ===
- Best Player of the Conference: Jimmy Alapag (Talk 'N Text)
- Best Import of the Conference: Nate Brumfield (Barangay Ginebra)
- Finals MVP: Jimmy Alapag and Jayson Castro (Talk 'N Text)

=== Players of the Week ===
Week	Player	Ref.
February 21 - February 27	LA Tenorio (Alaska Aces)	
February 28 - March 6	James Yap (B-Meg Derby Ace Llamados)	
March 7 - March 13	Joe Devance (Alaska Aces)	
March 14 - March 20	Mark Caguioa (Barangay Ginebra Kings)	
March 21 - March 27	LA Tenorio (Alaska Aces); Peter June Simon (B-Meg Derby Ace Llamados)	
March 28 - April 3	Danny Seigle (Air21 Express)	
April 4 - April 10	Larry Rodriguez (Rain or Shine Elasto Painters); Gabe Norwood (Rain or Shine Elasto Painters)	
April 11 - April 17	Mark Caguioa (Barangay Ginebra Kings)	
April 18 - April 24	Jimmy Alapag (Talk 'N Text Tropang Texters)	

== Statistical leaders ==
=== Locals ===
Category	Player	Team	Games played	Totals	Average
Points per game	Gary David	Powerade Tigers	9	211	23.44
Rebounds per game	Marc Pingris	Derby Ace Llamados	9	99	11.00
Assists per game	Chris Ross	Meralco Bolts	9	53	5.89
Steals per game	Ryan Reyes	Talk 'N Text Tropang Texters	9	17	1.89
Blocks per game	Danny Seigle	Air21 Express	6	9	1.50
Field goal percentage	Ali Peek	Talk 'N Text Tropang Texters	9	37-58	0.638
3-pt field goal percentage	Danny Seigle	Air21 Express	6	7-12	0.636
Free throw percentage	Joshua Urbiztondo	Air21 Express	8	10-10	1.000
Minutes per game	Marcio Lassiter	Smart Gilas	9	360	40.00

=== Imports ===
Category	Player	Team	Games played	Totals	Average
Points per game	Chamberlain Oguchi	Meralco Bolts	6	184	30.70
Rebounds per game	Marcus Douthit	Smart Gilas	8	146	18.30
Assists per game	Russell Carter	Powerade Tigers	5	27	5.40
Steals per game	Nate Brumfield	Brgy. Ginebra Kings	9	24	2.70
Blocks per game	Marcus Douthit	Smart Gilas	8	26	3.30
Field goal percentage	Marcus Douthit	Smart Gilas	8	69-126	0.548
3-pt field goal percentage	Chamberlain Oguchi	Meralco Bolts	6	30-75	0.400
Free throw percentage	Chamberlain Oguchi	Meralco Bolts	6	38-46	0.826
Minutes per game	Chamberlain Oguchi	Meralco Bolts	6	256	42.70
