= PBA on Solar Sports =

Branding used for PBA telecasts on Solar Sports in the Philippines

- Also known as: PBA on C/S9 (2008–09); PBA on Solar TV (2009–11)
- Genre: PBA game telecasts
- Presented by: see PBA on Solar Sports commentators
- Country of origin: Philippines
- Original languages: English; Filipino

Production
- Camera setup: Multiple-camera setup
- Running time: varies
- Production company: Solar Sports

Original release
- Network: C/S 9/Solar TV (2008–11); Studio 23 (2011); Basketball TV
- Release: October 8, 2008 – August 21, 2011

Related
- PBA on ABC; PBA on AKTV; PBA on KBS

PBA on Solar Sports (formerly known as PBA on C/S 9 and PBA on Solar TV) is a Philippine television sports presentation show broadcast by C/S, Solar TV and Studio 23. It aired from October 4, 2008 to August 21, 2011. The consist of branding used for presentation of Philippine Basketball Association produced by Solar Sports. Solar Entertainment had acquired the rights to the PBA after a highly publicized bidding war with major broadcaster ABS-CBN, and aired games on several channels, including Basketball TV, the RPN (which Solar was operating), and later on Studio 23.

== History ==
=== Bidding process ===
The Associated Broadcasting Company (ABC) had broadcast PBA games since 2004 on its VHF Channel 5, succeeding the failed NBN and IBC consortium which left the league in debt. ABC's current contract would expire at the end of the 2007–08 season, so the league began to accept bids for the next contract. ABC, the ABS-CBN Broadcasting Corporation (through ABS-CBN Sports), and the Solar Entertainment Corporation emerged as frontrunners.

ABS-CBN has served as the official broadcaster of UAAP basketball games since 2000. As part of its bid for the contract, ABS-CBN organized a charity exhibition game which aired on Studio 23, featuring PBA alumni from the Ateneo Blue Eagles and the De La Salle Green Archers. Solar Entertainment had recently begun a partnership with RPN to provide programming for the network, primarily in response to a carriage dispute with ABS-CBN-owned cable provider Sky Cable; which saw 6 of its networks (including its sports channels Solar Sports and Basketball TV) pulled from its systems in January 2008. However, ABC was reported to be piqued at the way the league was handling the bidding practice, hence it backed out of the bidding process. ABC had paid ₱70 million to air the 2007-08 season, its last.

The backing out of ABC narrowed down the field to two possible broadcasters; ABS-CBN (who would broadcast games on its main network and Studio 23), and Solar Entertainment (who would air games on Basketball TV and RPN, which Solar then operated under the on-air brand C/S 9). GMA Network was also reportedly planning to bid but backed out; it however denied that they offered a bid.

Another bidder eventually came into force, the Makisig Network; which would air the games on Intercontinental Broadcasting Corporation's DZTV-TV. However, it was reported that both ABS-CBN and Solar submitted identical bids to the PBA Board: ₱160 million for the first year, ₱168 million for the second and ₱170 million for the third year (compared to ABC's ₱70 million for its fifth year).

PBA Chairman Tony Chua of Red Bull Barako pushed the board to come out with a decision as soon as possible; former PBA chairman Ricky Vargas of the Talk 'N Text Phone Pals, a supporter of the ABS-CBN bid, said that money should not be a deciding factor. Also, Chua announced that Nielsen Media Research would research the comparative reach, demographics and audience share of both bids and present their findings to the PBA board. After receiving Nielsen's data, another provider, Mind Shares, was consulted. By this time, the bids were now slightly different: Solar's bid was ₱31 million greater than the amount ABS-CBN offered for the first three years of the contract, while ABS-CBN offered a four-year package with the option to sign a three-year contract-extension at the end of the initial deal, with Solar a straight-up three-year deal.

ABS-CBN backed out its bid after receiving a solitary vote in the 9-member board. However, Solar Sports did not automatically clinch the bid outright since the league was "insisting on a lockout to protect business interests of its team members". It was revealed that, according to Mind Share, if the PBA aired on RPN, it would rate 7.9%, while if it aired on Studio 23, it would rate 1.8%, "without taking into consideration the tremendous cross-promotions boost that would immediately impact on ratings under an ABS-CBN partnership." This caused Solar Sports to be the de facto front-runner.

=== Solar and the PBA ===
On May 27, 2008, the PBA announced that Solar Sports had won the rights with a deal reportedly worth ₱508 million. Aside from live games aired on RPN, Solar would provide additional coverage on its Basketball TV cable channel. The return of the PBA to RPN dates back to the inaugural season of the PBA in 1975 when games were broadcast on KBS.

During an October 15, 2010, double-header during the Philippine Cups' elimination round, Solar's satellite equipment experienced multiple faults, including alleged problems with the encoder and power amplifier. These technical problems caused intermittent interruptions to the telecasts, and forced a game between the Meralco Bolts and the Talk 'N Text Tropang Texters to be aired on Basketball TV the next day on tape delay. The technical problems resulted in commissioner Chito Salud issuing a ₱3,000,000 fine to Solar for not broadcasting a game live, a condition of the network's contract with the league. In a meeting with the PBA's board, Solar also promised that it would take steps to improve the quality of its telecasts and prevent such issues from occurring in the future.

=== Move to Studio 23 ===
In December 2010, Solar Entertainment announced that they would be seeking a new broadcast television partner for its PBA coverage due to a planned relaunch of the Solar TV network, with a new lineup aimed more 'feminine' programs (resulting in the dropping of all other sports programming from its lineup). Solar executives held meetings with representatives from ABS-CBN, the GMA Network, and the Associated Broadcasting Company in order to gauge interest in picking up the package, while commissioner Chito Salud made a statement on December 2 that the PBA board's only concern would be Solar's commitment to the rest of their contract with the league. On December 12, Salud announced that the PBA's Board of Governors officially approved Solar's request to find a new broadcasting partner.

On February 8, 2011, the board approved a proposal made by Solar Sports to produce PBA telecasts to air on ABS-CBN's Studio 23 network for the remainder of their contract with the league, beginning with the 2011 Commissioner's Cup. Peter Musñgi, vice president of ABS-CBN's sports department, applauded the decision, considering it a "vote of confidence" for Studio 23 and ABS-CBN's sports division as a whole.

Solar declined to renew its contract beyond the 2011-12 season. Sports5 and AKTV became the new official broadcasters of the PBA following the 2011 Governors' Cup.

Solar aired on Studio 23 it is the last PBA games during the Game 7 of the 2011 Governors' Cup finals between the Petron Blaze Boosters and the Talk 'N Text Tropang Texters. Sev Sarmenta, Andy Jao and Quinito Henson were the commentators for its last run.

== Commentators ==
Solar Entertainment announced their announcing team for the 2008–09 season at a meeting in Makati. Longtime PBA panelists Ed Picson and Quinito Henson covered their first game for the 2008–09 season between Talk 'N Text and Coca-Cola. Sev Sarmenta joined the PBA panel in February 2009 after a 6-year hiatus.

=== Final presenters ===
==== Anchors ====
- Mico Halili
- Paolo Trillo
- Magoo Marjon
- Sev Sarmenta
- Patricia Bermudez-Hizon
- Richard del Rosario

==== Color ====
- Norman Black
- Danny Francisco
- Quinito Henson
- Vince Hizon
- Jason Webb
- Andy Jao
- Ronnie Magsanoc
- Alex Compton
- Yeng Guiao

==== Courtside reporters ====
- Patricia Bermudez-Hizon
- Dominic Uy
- Chiqui Reyes
- Jinno Rufino
- Mica Abesamis
- Cesca Litton
- Marga Vargas

=== Former ===
==== Anchors ====
- Ed Picson
- Jude Turcuato
- Jimmy Javier
- Benjie Santiago
- Vitto Lazatin

==== Courtside reporters ====
- Lia Cruz
- Peaches Aberin
- Reema Chanco

== See also ==
- PBA on KBS - The PBA's original coverage partner.
- List of programs previously broadcast by Radio Philippines Network

Preceded by PBA on ABC/TV5	PBA TV coverage partners 2008–2011	Succeeded by PBA on AKTV
