= Chot Reyes =

Filipino basketball coach (born 1964)

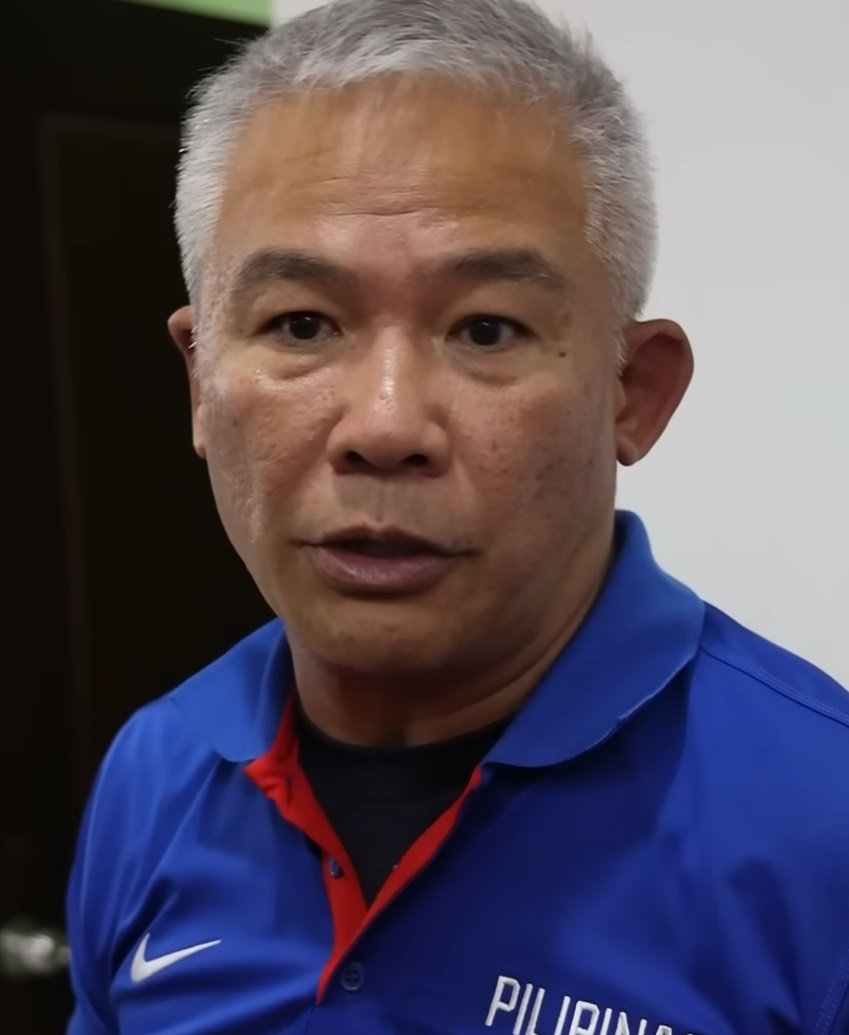
- Reyes in 2023

TNT Tropang 5G
- Position: Head coach
- League: PBA

Personal information
- Born: August 1, 1964 (age 62)

Career information
- High school: Ateneo (Manila)
- College: Ateneo
- Coaching career: 1989–present

Career history

Coaching
- 1989–1992: Alaska Air Force/Milkmen (assistant)
- 1990–1992: Ateneo
- 1993–1996: Purefoods TJ Hotdogs
- 1997: Sta. Lucia Realtors
- 1998–1999: Pangasinan Presidents
- 2000–2001: Pop Cola Panthers
- 2002–2005: Coca Cola Tigers
- 2005–2008: Philippines
- 2006: San Miguel Beermen
- 2008–2012: Talk 'N Text Tropang Texters
- 2012–2014, 2016–2018: Philippines
- 2021–2022: TNT Tropang Giga
- 2022–2023: Philippines
- 2024–present: TNT Tropang Giga / TNT Tropang 5G

Career highlights
- As head coach: 11× PBA champion (1993 All-Filipino, 1994 Commissioner's, 2002 All-Filipino, 2003 Reinforced, 2009 Philippine, 2011 Philippine, 2011 Commissioner's, 2012 Philippine, 2021 Philippine, 2024 Governors', 2024–25 Commissioner's); 7× PBA Coach of the Year (1993, 2002, 2003, 2009, 2011, 2021, 2025); 8× PBA All-Star Game Head Coach (1994, 2009, 2011, 2013, 2014, 2017, 2018, 2026); As assistant coach: PBA champion (1991 Third Conference); As senior consultant: PBA champion (2023 Governors'); As player: UAAP Mythical Five (1985)
Medals
Men's basketball
Head coach for Philippines
FIBA Asia Championship
Silver medal – second place	2013 Manila	Team
FIBA Asia Cup
Bronze medal – third place	2014 Wuhan	Team
SEA Games
Silver medal – second place	2021 Hanoi	Team
Gold medal – first place	2023 Phnom Penh	Team
William Jones Cup
Bronze medal – third place	2005 Taipei	Team
Bronze medal – third place	2007 Taipei	Team
Gold medal – first place	2012 Taipei	Team
Assistant coach for Philippines
Asian Games
Bronze medal – third place	1998 Bangkok	Team
William Jones Cup
Gold medal – first place	1998 Taipei	Team

Vincent "Chot" P. Reyes (born August 1, 1964) is a Filipino basketball coach who is the head coach for the TNT Tropang 5G of the Philippine Basketball Association (PBA). He also served as the head coach for the Philippine national basketball team, which he led to a silver medal finish at the 2013 FIBA Asia Championship and its subsequent appearance at the 2014 FIBA World Cup; the country's first in 36 years. He also coached the team in the 2023 FIBA World Cup.

In the Philippine Basketball Association (PBA), Reyes has won nine championships as head coach and has been recognized as a seven-time PBA Coach of the Year.

He was also the president and chief executive officer of TV5 Network from 2016 to 2019; as well as president of TV5 sales arm, Media5 Marketing.

== Education ==
Reyes graduated from the Ateneo de Manila University. He also attended the Edinburgh Business School in the United Kingdom.

== Playing career ==
Reyes has played for the Ateneo de Manila University in the University Athletic Association of the Philippines (UAAP) basketball championship in both the high school and collegiate level. As a player he was not able to clinch a UAAP title for his alma mater.

== Coaching career ==
=== Early years ===
While playing for the Ateneo Blue Eagles team and is in his sophomore year, Reyes' girlfriend and future wife got pregnant which led him to finding a job for a source of livelihood. He would try being an encyclopedia salesman before he was made the Ateneo Blue Eaglets (high school) coach. He would concurrently still play with the senior team and do part-time work in the Ministry of Transportation and Communications.

After graduating from college, Reyes would join Purefoods. He helped the company establish a basketball team for the company which would play in the Philippine Amateur Basketball League (PABL) in the late 1980s.

=== Professional basketball ===
In his mid-20s, Reyes wanted to put his corporate career on hold and return to coaching. He wanted to join the Purefoods basketball team which already joined the Philippine Basketball Association (PBA) by that time but there was no vacancy in the coaching staff.

Reyes would serve as head coach in the PBA from the 1993 to the 2012. He would make his comeback in head coaching in the PBA from 2022 to 2023, as the main tactician of TNT Tropang Giga.

As a head coach in the PBA, he has won nine PBA championships with the latest honor being the 2021 Philippine Cup title. He has also been named PBA Coach of Year six times by the PBA Press Corps.

==== Alaska ====
Reyes would become one of Tim Cone's assistant coaches during the early 90s with the Alaska Milkmen. He would also coach the Ateneo Blue Eagles and the Burger Machine team of the PABL.

Then only 27, Reyes took over the coaching for the Milkmen during the 1991 All-Filipino Conference as Cone was barred from coaching due to a case filed by the Basketball Coaches Association of the Philippines questioning Cone's hiring over other Filipinos. Reyes steered the Alaska franchise to a third-place finish in after beating San Miguel in a best-of-three series.

==== Coney Island / Purefoods ====
In 1993, Reyes was hired head coach of the Coney Island Ice Cream Stars (later known as the Purefoods Tender Juicy Giants). In his first conference, he led the Ice Cream Stars to a series win over the San Miguel Beermen to win the All-Filipino Cup, creating history by being the youngest coach to win a championship in his first tournament at age 29. This feat led him to win his first Coach-of-the-Year award. In 1994, he again led the Purefoods to the Commissioner's Cup prior to helping them make three more finals appearances until the conclusion of the 1996 season.

Purefoods decided not to renew his contract, a move Reyes did not question since he often incurred league fines.

==== Sta. Lucia ====
In less than a month after Purefoods let him go, Reyes was appointed as head coach of the Sta. Lucia Realtors. That year, he led the Realtors to a third-place finish in the All-Filipino Cup After eight months, Sta. Lucia removed Reyes as its head coach.

==== Pangasinan Presidents ====
In 1998, Reyes is become coach of team Pangasinan in the Metropolitan Basketball Association 1998 until 1999.

Record:

Season	Conference	Team	Elimination/Classification round					Playoffs				
Season	Conference	Team	GP	W	L	PCT	Finish	PG	W	L	PCT	Result
1998	National Conference	Pangasinan Presidents	21	6	15		12th	—	—	—	—	Eliminated
1999	National Conference	Pangasinan Presidents	30	5	25		15th	—	—	—	—	Eliminated
Career total			51	11	35		Playoff total	0	0	0	0	0 MBA championships

==== Pop Cola / Coca Cola ====
In 2000, Reyes became the new head coach of the Pop Cola Panthers. A program was started with the goal of Pop Cola winning a championship by its third season. After a frustrating first season, he led the Panthers to a third-place finish in the 2001 All-Filipino Cup. The last conference of the team as Pop Cola would be the 2001 Governor's Cup, where it finished fourth behind Shell.

The Pop Cola franchise was then sold to food conglomerate San Miguel Corporation (SMC), after SMC acquired Cosmos Bottling Corp. from previous PBA franchise owner RFM. The team would be renamed as the Coca-Cola Tigers. With Reyes' contract ending on December 21, 2001, his fate as head coach was uncertain for a while.

The SMC management would retain Reyes as coach with his original contract with Pop Cola intact in the lead up to the 2002 season. Reyes would accomplish the goal of the original Pop Cola program when Coca Cola won the 2002 All-Filipino Cup title – his third overall in the PBA. This was followed by finals appearance in all three conferences of the 2002 season, with the Tigers winning the Reinforced Conference of that season.

==== Talk 'N Text Tropang Texters ====
From 2009 to 2012, Reyes coached the Talk 'N Text Tropang Texters, helping them win four championships.

==== TNT Tropang Giga ====
After almost a decade of hiatus from the PBA, Reyes returned to coach Talk 'N Text after Manny V. Pangilinan personally offered him the role in February 2022. The team are now known as the TNT Tropang Giga by this time. He would help TNT end a six-year title drought when the team won the 2021 Philippine Cup.

Reyes would step down as head coach of TNT prior to the start of the 2023 Governors' Cup and took up the role of senior consultant to focus on his role as Philippine national team coach.

He returned to the head coach role in January 2024, ahead of the 2024 PBA Philippine Cup and months after he left the coaching role with the national team after the 2023 FIBA Basketball World Cup. He helped TNT win the 2024 Governors' Cup and 2024–25 Commissioner’s Cup. He was given his seventh Baby Dalupan Coach of the Year award.

=== Philippine national team ===
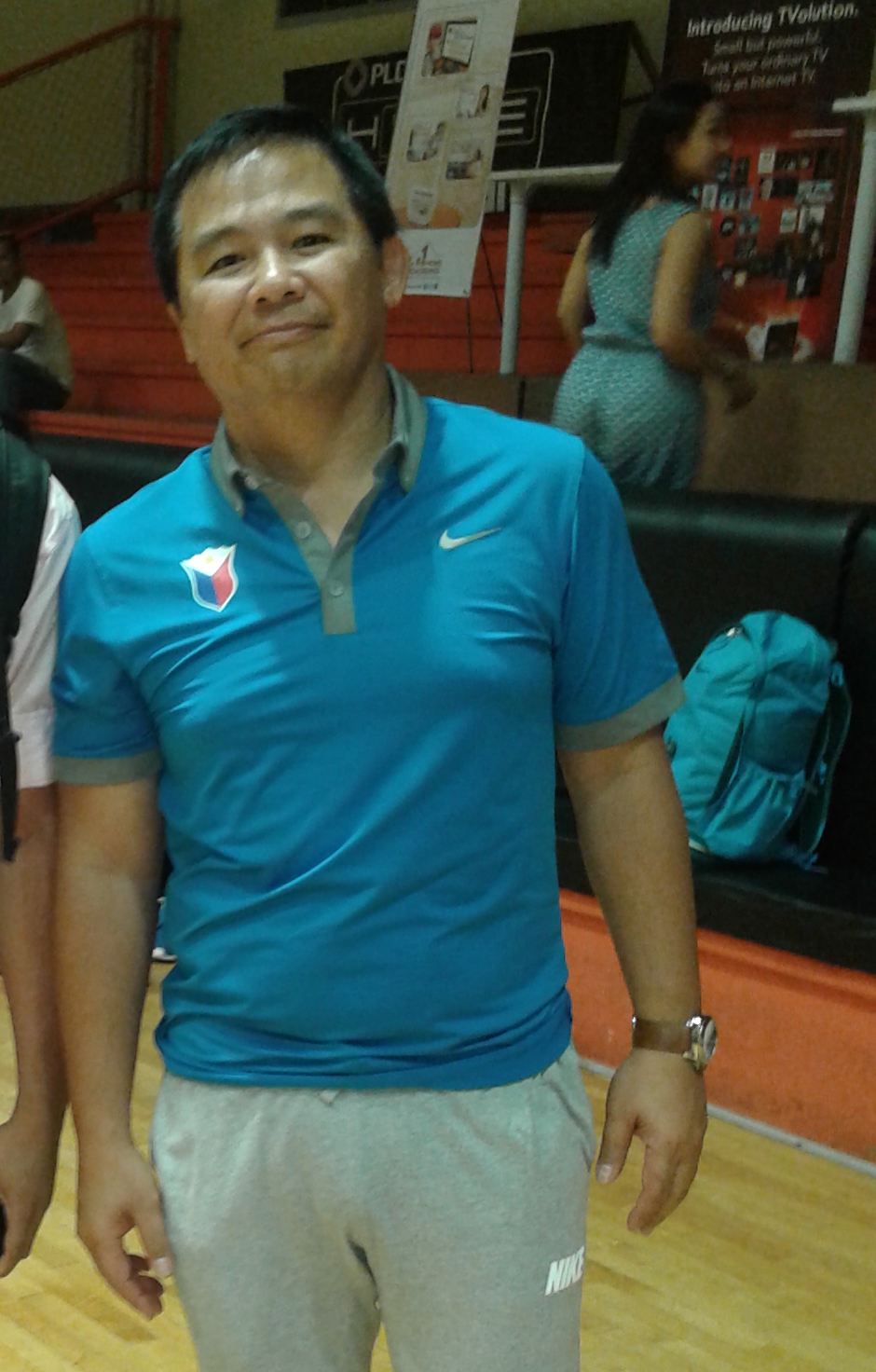
Reyes while in a national team practice session in 2014.

He was involved in the national team program as early as 1998, when he was the assistant coach of Tim Cone for the Philippine Centennial Team that went home with the bronze medal in the Asian Games in Thailand.

Reyes would serve as head coach of the Philippines men's national basketball team multiple times, including stints in the 2014 and 2023 FIBA Basketball World Cups.

==== 2005–2007 ====
Reyes first served as head coach of the Philippines in 2005, leading Team Pilipinas to a fifth-place finish in the FIBA-Asia Champions Cup and third-place in the William Jones Cup.

The national team program would be disrupted by the FIBA's suspension of the Basketball Association of the Philippines, then the Philippines' recognized governing body for basketball, in July 2005. The suspension stopped the national team's participation in the 2005 FIBA Asia Championship.

Nevertheless, the Philippines continued their bid to qualify for the Summer Olympics despite the suspension by participating in non-FIBA tournaments such as the William Jones Cup and playing tune-up games.

In 2007, the Samahang Basketbol ng Pilipinas would be approved by FIBA as the new national sport association for basketball in the country, and the FIBA suspension was lifted. Reyes would last coach in the 2007 FIBA Asia Championship in Japan. The tournament doubled as a qualifier for the 2008 Summer Olympics in Beijing. The team failed to qualify, finishing as ninth placers.

==== 2012–2014 ====
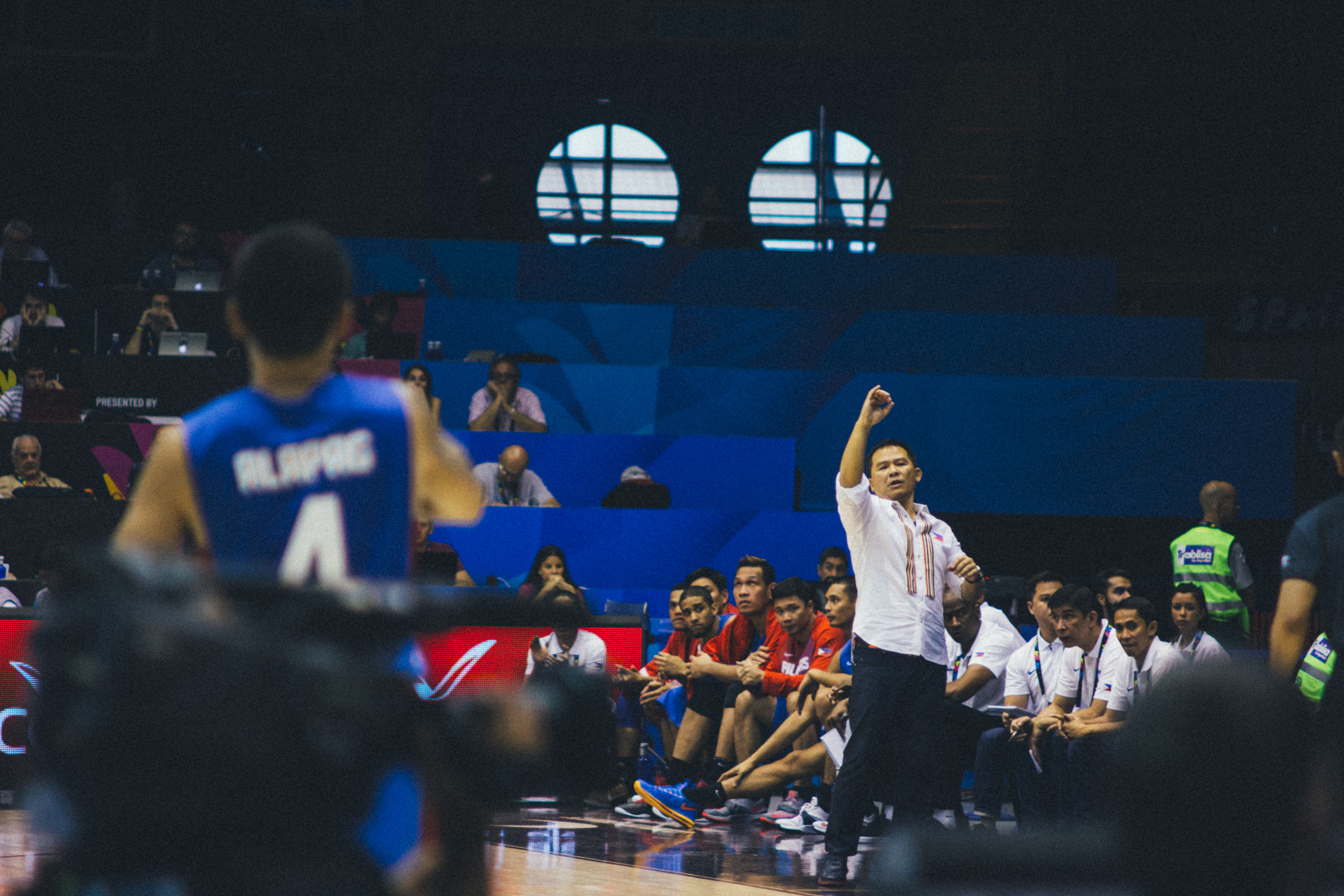
Reyes giving instructions to Jimmy Alapag

Reyes returned to coach the Philippine national team which won the 2012 William Jones Cup. They would compete in the 2012 FIBA Asia Cup.

He would coach the team in the 2013 FIBA Asia Championship that finished second, and consequentially qualify for the FIBA Basketball World Cup for the first time in 16 years.

Reyes would lead the team in the 2014 FIBA World Cup in Spain. The team lost to Croatia, Greece, Argentina and Puerto Rico but managed to end a 40-year winless drought by clinching an overtime win against Senegal in their final game.

The campaign would follow a subpar performance in the 2014 Asian Games in Incheon. The team's podium finish bid ended despite winning their quarterfinal match against Kazakhstan. In the final minutes of that game Reyes directed Marcus Douthit to shoot on the team's own basket to force their game to overtime since they needed to win by at least 11 points. The team won 67–65, but was relegated to the classification round. The team finished seventh place.

On October 30, 2014, the Gilas program was revamped with Reyes consequentially removed as the head coach of the Philippine national team.

==== 2016–2018 ====
On October 18, 2016, SBP executive director Sonny Barrios announced that Reyes would return as head coach of Gilas. This was despite his responsibilities as president and CEO of the TV5 Network upon encouragement from Manny V. Pangilinan.

He would be suspended for one game and fined following the Philippines–Australia basketball brawl in 2018 during the disrupted World Cup qualifier game. He would resign in September 2018. He was replaced by Yeng Guiao.

==== 2022–2023 ====
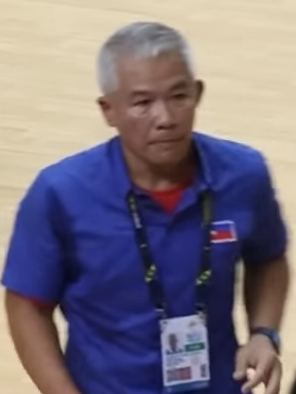
Chot Reyes at the 2023 Southeast Asian Games.

He would return as head coach once again in January 2022 taking over from Tab Baldwin who left. He would still remain with the TNT Tropang Giga, but changed roles from head coach to senior consultant in 2023 to prioritize his national coach role.

In May 2022, Reyes would lead the team in the 2021 Southeast Asian Games in Hanoi, where the Philippines suffered from an upset defeat to Indonesia in the gold medal match. Reyes would resign, but his move to leave the team was blocked by SBP president Al Panlilio who viewed a coaching change would not be ideal for the team's preparation for the 2023 FIBA Basketball World Cup which the country would be co-hosting.

The team would redeem itself in the 2023 Southeast Asian Games in Cambodia by winning the gold. Reyes says it would be his last SEA Games stint.

At the 2023 FIBA Basketball World Cup, hosted in the Philippines, Japan, and Indonesia, Reyes coached the Philippine national team. They conceded all of their group stage games against the Dominican Republic, Angola, and Italy. They were relegated to the classification round where they are set to play against South Sudan and China. The team failed to secure an automatic berth to the 2024 Summer Olympics in Paris after losing to South Sudan. The team would win one game against China. He would step down from the head coaching role shortly after the game. Reyes considers this as his "deepest, darkest" moment of his career and considered retiring from coaching. However he continued coaching with TNT in the PBA.

== Sports administration ==
Reyes helped managed the now-defunct Metropolitan Basketball Association of the 1990s. He was executive director of the league which was rival to the PBA.

Reyes would get appointed by Samahang Basketball ng Pilipinas president Al Panlilio, as the men's national team program director in early 2022 succeeding Tab Baldwin.

== Media career ==
Reyes is also a business executive in various media firms. He had headed Sports5 and Digital5 (now D5 Studio). In October 2016, he became the president and chief executive of TV5 Network and the president of Media5 Marketing Corp. Media5 is the sales arm of TV5.

Under his watch, he transition TV5 to a news and sports media outfit. The network stopped airing entertainment shows which were unprofitable. In 2017, the network partnered with ESPN Inc. to help TV5's market share in the Philippine market when it comes to sports coverage. Reyes would leave TV5 in 2019, rejecting an offer from Manny V. Pangilinan of a position in another company under the PLDT group.

== Personal life ==
Reyes has four children with his wife Cherry, who is also businessperson like himself. Cherry, along with her husband, is involved in the hairdressing industry and owns the Philippine franchise for Essensuals – Toni&Guy.

Chot is the older brother of former PBA player John Gilbert "Jun–Jun" Reyes, Jr., who played for Pepsi and Alaska, and of Mike Reyes, who is also a basketball coach, coaching for the Southwestern University PHINMA Cobras in the Cebu Schools Athletic Foundation, Inc. (CESAFI). His son, Josh is a basketball coach like himself who has become an assistant coach for the Far Eastern University, TNT Tropang Giga, and the Philippine national team. The younger Reyes would be the head coach of the Philippine U18 team which played in the 2018 FIBA Under-18 Asian Championship.

He is also the uncle of basketball player Jai Reyes.

Sporting positions
Preceded by Chito Narvasa	Ateneo Blue Eagles head coach 1990–1992	Succeeded by Baby Dalupan
Preceded by first	Burger Machine head coach 1991–1992	Succeeded by Perry Ronquillo
Preceded by Domingo Panganiban	Purefoods TJ Hotdogs/Coney Island Ice Cream Stars head coach 1993–1996	Succeeded by Eric Altamirano
Preceded by Adonis Tierra	Sta. Lucia Realtors head coach 1997	Succeeded by Derrick Pumaren
Preceded by Norman Black	Pop Cola Panthers head coach 2000–2001	Succeeded by last
Preceded by first	Coca-Cola Tigers head coach 2002–2005	Succeeded by Eric Altamirano
Preceded by Jong Uichico	Pilipinas Basketball head coach 2005–2007	Succeeded by Yeng Guiao
Preceded by Jong Uichico	San Miguel Beermen head coach 2006–2007	Succeeded by Biboy Ravanes
Preceded by Derrick Pumaren	Talk 'N Text Tropang Texters head coach 2008–2012	Succeeded by Norman Black
Preceded by Rajko Toroman	Gilas Pilipinas head coach 2012–2014	Succeeded by Tab Baldwin
Preceded by Tab Baldwin	Gilas Pilipinas head coach 2016–2018	Succeeded by Yeng Guiao
Preceded by Bong Ravena	TNT Tropang Giga head coach 2021–2022	Succeeded by Jojo Lastimosa
Preceded by Tab Baldwin	Gilas Pilipinas head coach 2022–2023	Succeeded by Tim Cone
