= Patricia Bermudez-Hizon =

Filipino television host

Patricia Bermudez–Hizon
- Born: September 5, 1977 (age 48)
- Occupations: Sportscaster; Head, One Sports
- Spouse: Vince Hizon
- Children: 3

Patricia Bermudez-Hizon (born September 5, 1977) is a sportscaster and television host in the Philippines. She is the current head of One Sports last January 2016 replacing Chot Reyes. She is the first ever female basketball television and radio anchor in the country. She started as a courtside reporter for the PBA in 2002 with the NBN and was the only female basketball courtside analyst with ABC. She is also the only Filipino on the elite list of presenters for the London Speaker Bureau, the largest speaker bureau in Europe, Africa, the Middle East and Asia.

After anchoring for Radyo5 PBA, she was eventually given the opportunity to anchor the Philippine Basketball League games in 2008-2009 - a first on Philippine Television history and eventually went on to anchor the PBA games. She also has covered the FIBA Asia Championships for Solar Network - Solar TV and Basketball TV. She is currently an anchor for the PBA on Fox Sports and made history with her husband Vince Hizon as the first husband and wife tandem to commentate on a PBA game. She is also one of the sportscasters for Sports5. She recently anchored the network's Sochi Winter Olympics coverage.

Patricia Bermudez Hizon has covered the Summer Olympic Games in 2000 and 2008, numerous South East Asian Games, Asian Games and also has covered a number of national sporting events such as the Tour Pilipinas for both television and radio, Palarong Pambansa, to name a few.

She was a courtside reporter for a game on June 8, 2003, when basketball player Vince Hizon proposed to her on the basketball court of the historic Araneta Coliseum during halftime. That unique and memorable proposal was witnessed by thousands of spectators and millions of television viewers.

She started as a newscaster in 1999 for the government station, PTV, and hosted numerous public affairs shows, election coverage, and a show with the First Gentleman Mike Arroyo. She also ventured into lifestyle shows and travel shows and documentaries for Lakbay TV, Isla Channel and Living Asia Channel. She also hosted the TV-shopping show Venta 5 on ABC 5 (now TV5).

Hizon is also the founder of the Everyday Is Your Birthday Foundation, and the Director for the High Five Hope Foundation and has been recognized for her charity work. She is also an advocate for the Beauty, Brains and Breastfeeding campaign for UNICEF. On top of that, she is also the Associate Executive Director for the Philippine Popular Music Festival of the Philpop MusicFest Foundation, the country's premier songwriting competition.

She has had a number of product endorsements and commercials (Listerine, Dove, Huggies, PhilAm insurance, Dove Men with her husband, and Pizza Hut with her entire family, etc.), and is a popular events host.

Bermudez-Hizon is also a motivational speaker and also is the only Filipino on the list of presenters for the London Speaker Bureau.

She was also the editor-at-large for the Baller Magazine, writer for several travel and lifestyle magazines, and is set to release her book series "So Can You".
