= Jason Webb =

Filipino basketball player and coach (born 1973)

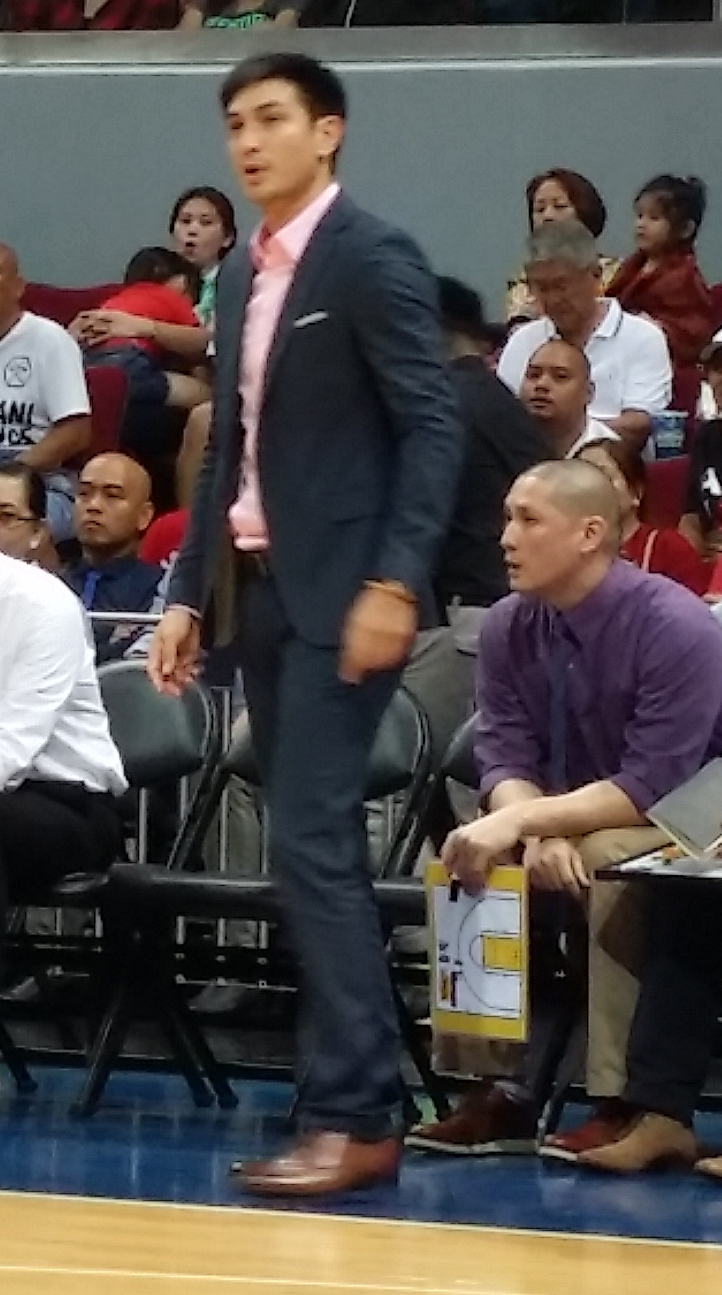
- Webb in 2015

Member of the Parañaque City Council from the 1st district
- In office June 30, 2010 – June 30, 2016

Personal details
- Born: September 23, 1973 (age 53) Parañaque, Rizal, Philippines
- Party: UNA (until 2016); Lakas–Kampi (until 2012)
- Domestic partner: Mylene Dizon (2013–present)
- Parents: Freddie Webb (father); Elizabeth Pagaspas (mother)
- Relatives: Hubert Webb (brother); Pinky Webb (sister)
- Basketball career

Magnolia Chicken Timplados Hotshots
- Title: Board governor
- League: PBA

Personal information
- Listed height: 6 ft 2 in (1.88 m)
- Listed weight: 170 lb (77 kg)

Career information
- College: De La Salle
- PBA draft: 1997: 1st round, 3rd overall pick
- Drafted by: Sta. Lucia Realtors
- Playing career: 1997–2003
- Position: Point guard / shooting guard
- Number: 1, 80
- Coaching career: 2014–present

Career history

Playing
- 1997–1998; 2003: Sta. Lucia Realtors
- 1999–2001: Tanduay Rhum Masters

Coaching
- 2014–2015; 2016–2025: Magnolia Chicken Timplados Hotshots (assistant coach/team consultant)
- 2015–2016: Star Hotshots

Career highlights
- As assistant coach: 2× PBA champion (2014 Governors', 2018 Governors'); As player: PBL Most Valuable Player (1996 Import Reinforced)

Jason Pagaspas Webb (born September 23, 1973) is a Filipino basketball coach and former basketball player.

== Playing career ==
Webb played collegiate basketball for the De La Salle Green Archers from 1991 to 1995. After college, he played for Stag/Tanduay in the Philippine Basketball League (1995–1997).

Webb began his PBA career in 1997 with the Sta. Lucia Realtors. After two seasons, he played for the Tanduay Rhum Masters (1999–2001).

== TV commentator ==
Webb was a color commentator/game analyst for PBA on Sports5 from 2011 to 2014. Webb return as color commentator/game analyst for UAAP from 2021 to present.

== Coaching career ==
Webb began his coaching career as an assistant coach for the Star Hotshots in June 2014 and was appointed as its head coach in July 2015. On October 14, 2016, he was appointed as team consultant after being replaced as head coach by Chito Victolero.

== Coaching record ==
=== PBA ===
Team	Season	Conference										
Team	Season	Conference	PG	W	L	PCT	Finish	PG	W	L	PCT	Results
Star	2015–16	Philippine Cup	11	4	7	.364	9th	1	0	1	.000	Lost in the Quarterfinals Phase 1
Star	2015–16	Commissioner's	11	5	6	.455	8th	2	1	1	.500	Lost in the Quarterfinals (with twice-to-win disadvantage)
Star	2015–16	Governors'	11	2	9	.182	11th	—	—	—	—	Missed playoffs
Totals			33	11	22	.333	Playoff Totals	3	1	2	.333	0 PBA championship

== Personal life ==
Webb is one of the sons of former Philippine senator Freddie Webb. He is the brother of Pinky Webb and Hubert Webb. Webb was formerly married to CNN Philippines anchor Claudine Trillo, with whom he has two daughters. He was in a relationship with actress Mylene Dizon since 2013. In 2014, he married Dizon.

Webb owns a Japanese restaurant called Yaku.
