= 2010–11 Powerade Tigers season =

- Head coach: Bo Perasol
- General manager: Kenneth Duremdes
- Owner: Coca-Cola Bottlers Philippines, Inc.

Philippine Cup results
- Record: 3–11 (21.4%)
- Place: 9th
- Playoff finish: did not qualify

Commissioner's Cup results
- Record: 2–7 (22.2%)
- Place: 9th
- Playoff finish: Did not qualify

Governors Cup results
- Record: 4–4 (50%)
- Place: 7th
- Playoff finish: Did not qualify

Powerade Tigers seasons

The 2010–11 Powerade Tigers season was the 9th season of the franchise in the Philippine Basketball Association (PBA).

== Key dates ==
- August 29: The 2010 PBA Draft took place in Fort Bonifacio, Taguig.

== Draft picks ==
| Round | Pick | Player | Height | Position | Nationality | College |
|---|---|---|---|---|---|---|
| 2 | 18 | Jai Reyes | 5'8" | Point guard | Philippines | Ateneo de Manila |

== Roster ==
2010–11 Powerade Tigers roster
Players

| Pos. | # | POB | Name | Height | Weight | DOB (YYYY–MM–DD) | From |
|---|---|---|---|---|---|---|---|
| PG | 1 | (Philippines) | Celino Cruz | 5 ft 9 in (1.75 m) | 180 lb (82 kg) | | Far Eastern |
| SG | 5 | (Philippines) | R.J Rizada | 6 ft 2 in (1.88 m) | 185 lb (84 kg) | | Far Eastern |
| G/F | 8 | (Philippines) | Francis Allera | 6 ft 3 in (1.91 m) | 180 lb (82 kg) | | UST |
| SF | 10 | (Canada) | Sean Anthony (R) | 6 ft 4 in (1.93 m) | 200 lb (91 kg) | | McGill |
| PG | 15 | (Philippines) | Jai Reyes (R) | 5 ft 7 in (1.70 m) | 170 lb (77 kg) | | Ateneo |
| C | 16 | (Philippines) | Dennis Espino (C) | 6 ft 6 in (1.98 m) | 215 lb (98 kg) | | UST |
| SG | 20 | (Philippines) | Gary David | 6 ft 0 in (1.83 m) | 180 lb (82 kg) | | Lyceum |
| PG | 21 | (Philippines) | Ronjay Enrile | 6 ft 1 in (1.85 m) | 168 lb (76 kg) | | Letran |
| F/C | 22 | (United States) | Robert Reyes | 6 ft 5 in (1.96 m) | 215 lb (98 kg) | | Flagler |
| F | 24 | (Philippines) | Ricky Calimag | 6 ft 5 in (1.96 m) | 210 lb (95 kg) | | San Beda |
| PG | 26 | (Philippines) | Chico Lanete | 6 ft 0 in (1.83 m) | 170 lb (77 kg) | | Lyceum |
| F | 28 | (Philippines) | Norman Gonzales | 6 ft 4 in (1.93 m) | 200 lb (91 kg) | | San Beda |
| F | 34 | (United States) | William Antonio | 6 ft 3 in (1.91 m) | 190 lb (86 kg) | | Chaminade |
| F/C | 48 | (Philippines) | J.R. Quiñahan | 6 ft 6 in (1.98 m) | 240 lb (109 kg) | | Visayas |
| F | 65 | (Philippines) | Eddie Laure | 6 ft 3 in (1.91 m) | 200 lb (91 kg) | | Adamson |
| G/F | 80 | (Philippines) | Mark Macapagal | 6 ft 2 in (1.88 m) | 185 lb (84 kg) | | San Sebastian |

Coaches
Head coach
- (Philippines) Bo Perasol (UP Diliman)
Assistant(s)
- (Philippines) George Ella (UE)
- (United States) Alex Compton (Cornell)
- (Philippines) Ricky Dandan (UP Diliman)

Legend
- (DP) Unsigned draft pick
- (FA) Free agent
- (S) Suspended
- (I) Import
- Injured

== Depth chart ==
| Pos. | Starting 5 | Bench 1 | Bench 2 | Bench 3 |
|---|---|---|---|---|
| C | J.R. Quiñahan | Dennis Espino |
| PF | Rob Reyes | William Antonio | Ricky Calimag |
| SF | Sean Anthony | Eddie Laure | Norman Gonzales | Francis Allera |
| SG | Gary David | Mark Macapagal | RJ Rizada | Ronjay Enrile |
| PG | Chico Lanete | Celino Cruz | Jai Reyes | Paolo Mendoza |

== Philippine Cup ==
=== Eliminations ===
==== Standings ====
| Pos | Team | W | L | PCT | GB | Qualification |
|---|---|---|---|---|---|---|
| 1 | Talk 'N Text Tropang Texters | 11 | 3 | .786 (Note: Head-to-head record: San Miguel 1–1 Talk 'N Text (San Miguel +9)) | — | Twice-to-beat in the quarterfinals |
| 2 | San Miguel Beermen | 11 | 3 | .786 | — | Twice-to-beat in the quarterfinals |
| 3 | Barangay Ginebra Kings | 10 | 4 | .714 | 1 | Best-of-three quarterfinals |
| 4 | B-Meg Derby Ace Llamados | 7 | 7 | .500 (Note: Head-to-head differential: B-Meg +23, Meralco −11, Alaska −12) | 4 | Best-of-three quarterfinals |
| 5 | Meralco Bolts | 7 | 7 | .500 | 4 | Best-of-three quarterfinals |
| 6 | Alaska Aces | 7 | 7 | .500 | 4 | Best-of-three quarterfinals |
| 7 | Air21 Express | 6 | 8 | .429 | 5 | Twice-to-win in the quarterfinals |
| 8 | Rain or Shine Elasto Painters | 5 | 9 | .357 | 6 | Twice-to-win in the quarterfinals |
| 9 | Powerade Tigers | 3 | 11 | .214 (Note: Head-to-head record: Barako Bull 1–0 Powerade) | 8 | |
| 10 | Barako Bull Energy Boosters | 3 | 11 | .214 | 8 | |

Source: PBA.ph

==== Game log ====
2011 PBA Philippine Cup game log
October

| Game | Date | Opponent | Score | High points | High rebounds | High assists | Location Attendance | Record |
|---|---|---|---|---|---|---|---|---|
| 1 | October 6 | Rain or Shine | 111–103 | David (25) | Anthony (12) | David, Anthony (4) | Araneta Coliseum | 1–0 |
| 2 | October 9 | Ginebra | 75–82 | David (27) | R. Reyes (9) | David (5) | Batangas City | 1–1 |
| 3 | October 17 | Barako | | | | | Araneta Coliseum | |
| 4 | October 23 | San Miguel | | | | | Panabo City | |
| 5 | October 27 | Talk 'N Text | | | | | Araneta Coliseum | |
| 6 | October 30 | Meralco | | | | | Araneta Coliseum | |

November

| Game | Date | Opponent | Score | High points | High rebounds | High assists | Location Attendance | Record |
|---|---|---|---|---|---|---|---|---|
| 7 | November 3 | Air21 | | | | | Araneta Coliseum | |
| 8 | November 10 | Alaska | | | | | Araneta Coliseum | |
| 9 | November 12 | Derby Ace | | | | | Araneta Coliseum | |
| 10 | November 19 | Air21 | | | | | Cuneta Astrodome | |
| 11 | November 24 | Meralco | | | | | Araneta Coliseum | |

December

| Game | Date | Opponent | Score | High points | High rebounds | High assists | Location Attendance | Record |
|---|---|---|---|---|---|---|---|---|
| 12 | December 1 | Talk 'N Text | | | | | Araneta Coliseum | |
| 13 | December 3 | Ginebra | | | | | Cuneta Astrodome | |
| 14 | December 15 | Alaska | | | | | Araneta Coliseum | |

2010–11 schedule

== Commissioner's Cup ==
=== Eliminations ===
==== Standings ====
| Pos | Team | W | L | PCT | GB | Qualification |
|---|---|---|---|---|---|---|
| 1 | Talk 'N Text Tropang Texters | 8 | 1 | .889 | — | Advance to semifinals |
| 2 | Smart Gilas (G) | 7 | 2 | .778 | 1 | Advance to semifinals |
| 3 | Barangay Ginebra Kings | 5 | 4 | .556 (Note: Head-to-head differential: Barangay Ginebra +12, Air21 −4, Alaska −8) | 3 | Advance to quarterfinals |
| 4 | Air21 Express | 5 | 4 | .556 | 3 | Advance to quarterfinals |
| 5 | Alaska Aces | 5 | 4 | .556 | 3 | Advance to quarterfinals |
| 6 | Rain or Shine Elasto Painters | 4 | 5 | .444 (Note: Head-to-head record: Rain or Shine 1–0 B-Meg) | 4 | Advance to quarterfinals |
| 7 | B-Meg Derby Ace Llamados | 4 | 5 | .444 | 4 | |
| 8 | Meralco Bolts | 3 | 6 | .333 | 5 | |
| 9 | Powerade Tigers | 2 | 7 | .222 (Note: Head-to-head record: Powerade 1–0 San Miguel) | 6 | |
| 10 | San Miguel Beermen | 2 | 7 | .222 | 6 | |

Source: PBA.ph
(G) Guests

== Governors Cup ==
=== Eliminations ===
==== Standings ====
| Pos | Team | W | L | PCT | GB | Qualification |
|---|---|---|---|---|---|---|
| 1 | Talk 'N Text Tropang Texters | 6 | 2 | .750 | — | Semifinal round |
| 2 | Petron Blaze Boosters | 5 | 3 | .625 (Note: Head-to-head differential: Petron +10, Alaska +5, Barangay Ginebra −15) | 1 | Semifinal round |
| 3 | Alaska Aces | 5 | 3 | .625 | 1 | Semifinal round |
| 4 | Barangay Ginebra Kings | 5 | 3 | .625 | 1 | Semifinal round |
| 5 | Rain or Shine Elasto Painters | 4 | 4 | .500 (Note: Head-to-head differential: Rain or Shine +11, B-Meg 0, Powerade −11) | 2 | Semifinal round |
| 6 | B-Meg Derby Ace Llamados | 4 | 4 | .500 | 2 | Semifinal round |
| 7 | Powerade Tigers | 4 | 4 | .500 | 2 | |
| 8 | Meralco Bolts | 3 | 5 | .375 | 3 | |
| 9 | Air21 Express | 0 | 8 | .000 | 6 | |

Source: PBA.ph

== Transactions ==
=== Pre-season ===
| August 29, 2010 | To Powerade 2010 2nd round pick (Jai Reyes); Sean Anthony; Ren-Ren Ritualo | To Air21 2011 2nd round pick 2012 future picks |
| September 16, 2010 | To Powerade Eddie Laure; 2011 1st round pick | To Rain or Shine Larry Rodriguez |

| September 22, 2010 | To Powerade Robert Reyes (from Barako Bull); 2011 and 2012 2nd round picks (from Meralco); 2013 2nd round pick (from Barako Bull) | To Meralco Asi Taulava (from Powerade) | To Barako Bull Jason Misolas (from Meralco); Khasim Mirza (from Meralco); Ken Bono (from Powerade) |

=== Philippine Cup ===
==== Trades ====
| January 31, 2011 | To Powerade J.R. Quiñahan | To Air21 2012 second round and 2013 first round picks |

=== Imports recruited ===
| Conference | Name | Debuted | Last game | Record |
|---|---|---|---|---|
| Commissioner's Cup | (United States) Russell Carter | February 23 (vs. Alaska) | March 11 (vs. Barangay Ginebra) | 1–4 |
| Commissioner's Cup | (United States) Martin Zeno | March 16 (vs. San Miguel) | April 3 (vs. Air21) | 1–3 |
| Governors Cup | (United States) Chris Porter | June 12 (vs. Barangay Ginebra) | July 20 (vs. Meralco) | 4–4 |
