= 2011–12 Powerade Tigers season =

- Head coach: Bo Perasol
- General Manager: Kenneth Duremdes
- Owner(s): Coca-Cola Bottlers Philippines, Inc.

Philippine Cup results
- Record: 6–8 (42.9%)
- Place: 8th
- Playoff finish: Runner-up (def. by Talk 'N Text, 1–4)

Commissioner's Cup results
- Record: 4–5 (44.4%)
- Place: 7th
- Playoff finish: Did not qualify

Governors Cup results
- Record: 4–5 (44.4%)
- Place: 7th
- Playoff finish: Did not qualify (lost to Meralco in 6th seed playoff)

Powerade Tigers seasons

The 2011–12 Powerade Tigers season was the 10th and final season of the franchise in the Philippine Basketball Association (PBA).

== Key dates ==
- August 28: The 2011 PBA Draft took place in Robinson's Place Ermita, Manila.

== Draft picks ==
Round	Pick	Player	Position	Nationality	College
1	1	JV Casio	PG	Philippines	De La Salle University
1	4	Marcio Lassiter	SG/SF	United States	Cal State Fullerton
2	21	John Marc Agustin	F	Philippines	Adamson

== Roster ==
2011–12 Powerade Tigers roster
Players
Coaches

Pos.	#	POB	Name	Height	Weight	DOB (YYYY–MM–DD)	From
C	2	(Philippines)	Rabeh Al-Hussaini	6 ft 7 in (2.01 m)	240 lb (109 kg)		Ateneo
G	3	(Philippines)	James Martinez (R)	5 ft 10 in (1.78 m)	170 lb (77 kg)		UE
PG	4	(Philippines)	Rudy Lingganay (R)	5 ft 10 in (1.78 m)	170 lb (77 kg)		UE
F/C	5	(Philippines)	Jondan Salvador	6 ft 3 in (1.91 m)	210 lb (95 kg)		St. Benilde
G/F	7	(Philippines)	Rey Guevarra	6 ft 3 in (1.91 m)	175 lb (79 kg)		Letran
SF	8	(Philippines)	Francis Allera	6 ft 3 in (1.91 m)	180 lb (82 kg)		UST
SF	10	(Canada)	Sean Anthony	6 ft 4 in (1.93 m)	200 lb (91 kg)		McGill
G/F	15	(Philippines)	Lordy Tugade	6 ft 3 in (1.91 m)	184 lb (83 kg)		National-U
C	17	(Philippines)	Rommel Adducul	6 ft 6 in (1.98 m)	225 lb (102 kg)		San Sebastian
SG	20	(Philippines)	Gary David (C)	6 ft 1 in (1.85 m)	180 lb (82 kg)		Lyceum
G/F	22	(United States)	Josh Vanlandingham	6 ft 4 in (1.93 m)	205 lb (93 kg)		Pacific Lutheran
F	24	(Philippines)	Ricky Calimag	6 ft 4 in (1.93 m)	210 lb (95 kg)		San Beda
F	33	(United States)	Nic Belasco	6 ft 6 in (1.98 m)	210 lb (95 kg)		Notre Dame (MD)
PF	34	(United States)	William Antonio (C)	6 ft 3 in (1.91 m)	190 lb (86 kg)		Chaminade
PG	42	(Philippines)	JV Casio (R)	5 ft 10 in (1.78 m)	175 lb (79 kg)		De La Salle
C	43	(United States)	Alex Crisano (injured) (IN)	6 ft 7 in (2.01 m)	240 lb (109 kg)		Brooklyn

Head coach

- (Philippines) Bo Perasol (UP Diliman)

Assistant coach(es)

- (Philippines) George Ella (UE)
- (United States) Alex Compton (Cornell)
- (Philippines) Ricky Dandan (UP Diliman)
- (Philippines) Charles Tiu (Ateneo)

Legend

- (C) Team captain
- (CI) Commissioner's Cup Import
- (GI) Governors' Cup Import
- (EI) EASL Import
- (DP) Unsigned draft pick
- (FA) Free agent
- (IN) Inactive
- (S) Suspended
- (R) Rookie
- Injured

== Philippine Cup ==
=== Eliminations ===
==== Standings ====
Pos	Team	W	L	PCT	GB	Qualification
1	B-Meg Llamados	10	4	.714 (Note: Head-to-head record: B-Meg 1–1 Talk 'N Text (B-Meg +8))	—	Twice-to-beat in the quarterfinals
2	Talk 'N Text Tropang Texters	10	4	.714	—	Twice-to-beat in the quarterfinals
3	Petron Blaze Boosters	9	5	.643 (Note: Head-to-head differential: Petron +8, Barangay Ginebra +1, Rain or Shine −9)	1	Best-of-three quarterfinals
4	Barangay Ginebra San Miguel	9	5	.643	1	Best-of-three quarterfinals
5	Rain or Shine Elasto Painters	9	5	.643	1	Best-of-three quarterfinals
6	Meralco Bolts	8	6	.571	2	Best-of-three quarterfinals
7	Barako Bull Energy Cola	6	8	.429 (Note: Head-to-head record: Barako Bull 1–1 Powerade (Barako Bull +35))	4	Twice-to-win in the quarterfinals
8	Powerade Tigers	6	8	.429	4	Twice-to-win in the quarterfinals
9	Alaska Aces	3	11	.214	7	
10	Shopinas.com Clickers	0	14	.000	10	

Source: PBA.ph

=== Bracket ===
Quarterfinals
(#1 twice-to-beat)
1	B-Meg	88	123
8	Powerade	97	131*
(best-of-3)
4	Barangay Ginebra	0
5	Rain or Shine	2
(#2 twice-to-beat)
2	Talk 'N Text	81
7	Barako Bull	79
(best-of-3)
3	Petron Blaze	2
6	Meralco	0

Semifinals (best-of-7)
8	Powerade	4
5	Rain or Shine	3
2	Talk 'N Text	4
3	Petron Blaze	3

Finals (best-of-7)
8	Powerade	1
2	Talk 'N Text	4

*Game went into overtime

=== Quarterfinals ===
==== B-Meg vs. Powerade ====
December 14

B-Meg Llamados 88, Powerade Tigers 97

Smart Araneta Coliseum, Quezon City

December 18

B-Meg Llamados 123, Powerade Tigers 131 (OT)
Powerade wins series in two games

Smart Araneta Coliseum, Quezon City

=== Semifinals ===
==== Powerade-Rain or Shine series ====
January 4

Rain or Shine Elasto Painters 114, Powerade Tigers 97

Cuneta Astrodome, Pasay

January 6

Rain or Shine Elasto Painters 113, Powerade Tigers 121

Smart Araneta Coliseum, Quezon City

January 8

Rain or Shine Elasto Painters 99, Powerade Tigers 104 (OT)

Smart Araneta Coliseum, Quezon City

January 10

Rain or Shine Elasto Painters 110, Powerade Tigers 95

Smart Araneta Coliseum, Quezon City

January 13

Rain or Shine Elasto Painters 108, Powerade Tigers 110

Smart Araneta Coliseum, Quezon City

January 15

Rain or Shine Elasto Painters 112, Powerade Tigers 98

Smart Araneta Coliseum, Quezon City

January 18

Rain or Shine Elasto Painters 98, Powerade Tigers 107
Powerade wins series 4–3

Cuneta Astrodome, Pasay

=== Finals ===
January 20

Talk 'N Text Tropang Texters 116, Powerade Tigers 100

Davao del Sur Coliseum, Digos, Davao del Sur

January 23

Talk 'N Text Tropang Texters 102, Powerade Tigers 96

Smart Araneta Coliseum, Quezon City

January 25

Talk 'N Text Tropang Texters 133, Powerade Tigers 126 (OT)

Smart Araneta Coliseum, Quezon City

January 27

Talk 'N Text Tropang Texters 97, Powerade Tigers 100

Smart Araneta Coliseum, Quezon City

January 29

Talk 'N Text Tropang Texters 110, Powerade Tigers 101
Talk 'N Text wins series 4–1

Smart Araneta Coliseum, Quezon City

== Commissioner's Cup ==
=== Eliminations ===
==== Standings ====
Pos	Team	W	L	PCT	GB	Qualification
1	Talk 'N Text Tropang Texters	7	2	.778	—	Advance to semifinals
2	Barangay Ginebra Kings	6	3	.667 (Note: Second seed playoff: Barangay Ginebra 93–84 B-Meg)	1	Advance to semifinals
3	B-Meg Llamados	6	3	.667	1	Advance to quarterfinals
4	Alaska Aces	5	4	.556	2	Advance to quarterfinals
5	Barako Bull Energy Cola	4	5	.444 (Note: Head-to-head quotient: Barako Bull 1.04, Meralco 1.01, Powerade 0.95; sixth seed playoff: Meralco 102–98 Powerade)	3	Advance to quarterfinals
6	Meralco Bolts	4	5	.444	3	Advance to quarterfinals
7	Powerade Tigers	4	5	.444	3	
8	Rain or Shine Elasto Painters	3	6	.333 (Note: Head-to-head quotient: Rain or Shine 1.12, Petron 1.11, Air21 0.80)	4	
9	Petron Blaze Boosters	3	6	.333	4	
10	Air21 Express	3	6	.333	4	

Source: PBA.ph

==== Seeding playoffs ====
March 30

6th seed

Meralco Bolts 102, Powerade Tigers 98

Cuneta Astrodome, Pasay

== Governors Cup ==
=== Eliminations ===
==== Standings ====
Pos	Team	W	L	PCT	GB	Qualification
1	Rain or Shine Elasto Painters	8	1	.889	—	Semifinal round
2	B-Meg Llamados	6	3	.667	2	Semifinal round
3	Talk 'N Text Tropang Texters	5	4	.556 (Note: Head-to-head differential: Talk 'N Text +18, Barangay Ginebra 0, Petron −18)	3	Semifinal round
4	Barangay Ginebra Kings	5	4	.556	3	Semifinal round
5	Petron Blaze Boosters	5	4	.556	3	Semifinal round
6	Meralco Bolts	4	5	.444 (Note: Head-to-head differential: Meralco +11, Barako Bull +8, Powerade −18; sixth seed playoffs: Powerade 99–95 Barako Bull, Meralco 94–86 Powerade)	4	Semifinal round
7	Powerade Tigers	4	5	.444	4	
8	Barako Bull Energy Cola	4	5	.444	4	
9	Alaska Aces	2	7	.222 (Note: Head-to-head record: Alaska 1–0 Air21)	6	
10	Air21 Express	2	7	.222	6	

Source: PBA.ph

==== 6th-seed playoffs ====
July 3

KO game

Barako Bull Energy 95, Powerade Tigers 99

Smart Araneta Coliseum, Quezon City

July 4

6th seed

Meralco Bolts 94, Powerade Tigers 86

Smart Araneta Coliseum, Quezon City

== Transactions ==
=== Trades ===
==== Pre-season ====
August 26, 2011	To Powerade Doug Kramer; Josh Vanlandingham	To Rain or Shine JR Quiñahan; Norman Gonzales; 2013 and 2014 second round picks

August 28, 2011	To Powerade Chris Timberlake (from Meralco); Ogie Menor (from Meralco); 2011 2nd round pick (John Marc Agustin) (from Talk 'N Text)	To Talk 'N Text Bam Gamalinda (from Meralco); Shawn Weinstein (from Meralco)	To Meralco Mark Yee (from Talk 'N Text); 2011 1st round pick (Jason Ballesteros) (from Talk 'N Text); Mark Macapagal (from Powerade)

==== Commissioner's Cup ====
April 20, 2012	To Powerade Rabeh Al-Hussaini; Rey Guevarra; Lordy Tugade	To Petron Blaze Marcio Lassiter; Celino Cruz

May 1, 2012	To Powerade Jondan Salvador; 2012 second round pick	To Barako Doug Kramer

=== Additions ===
Player	Signed	Former team
James Martinez	August 28, 2012	Barangay Ginebra Kings
Rabeh Al-Hussaini	April 20, 2012(via trade)	Petron Blaze Boosters
Rey Guevarra	April 20, 2012(via trade)	Petron Blaze Boosters
Lordy Tugade	April 20, 2012(via trade)	Petron Blaze Boosters
Jondan Salvador	May 1, 2012(via trade)	Barako Bull Energy

=== Subtractions ===
Player	Signed	Former team
Marcio Lassiter	April 20, 2012	traded to Petron Blaze Boosters
Celino Cruz	April 20, 2012	traded to Barako Bull Energy via Petron Blaze Boosters
Doug Kramer	May 1, 2012	traded to Barako Bull Energy

=== Recruited imports ===
Tournament	Name	Debuted	Last game	Record
Commissioner's Cup	Dwayne Jones	February 17 (vs. Rain or Shine)	March 30 (vs. Meralco)	4–6
Governors Cup	Rashad McCants	May 20 (vs. Petron)	May 25 (vs. Barako Bull)	0–2
Governors Cup	Omar Sneed	June 1 (vs. Alaska)	July 4 (vs. Meralco)	5–4
