= Ali Peek =

Filipino basketball player (born 1975)

Personal information
- Born: February 13, 1975 (age 51) Hawaii, United States
- Listed height: 6 ft 4 in (1.93 m)
- Listed weight: 275 lb (125 kg)

Career information
- College: Saint Mary's (1992–1995)
- PBA draft: 1998: 1st round, 3rd overall pick
- Drafted by: Pop Cola Panthers
- Playing career: 1998–2014
- Position: Power forward / center
- Number: 1, 2, 4, 34, 73

Career history

Playing
- 1998–2000: Pop Cola 800s / Panthers
- 2001–2004: Alaska Aces
- 2004–2007: Coca-Cola Tigers
- 2008–2010: Talk 'N Text Phone Pals / Tropang Texters
- 2010: Sta. Lucia Realtors
- 2010–2014: Talk 'N Text Tropang Texters

Coaching
- 2015: Laguna BUSA Warriors (assistant)
- 2017–2019: Benilde (assistant)

Career highlights
- 6x PBA champion (2003 Invitational, 2009 Philippine, 2011 Philippine, 2011 Commissioner's, 2012 Philippine, 2013 Philippine); PBA Best Player of the Conference (2003 Invitational); PBA Sportmsmanship awardee (2008); 5× PBA All-Star (1999–2001, 2004, 2006); PBA Mythical First Team (2001); PBA Mythical Second Team (2011); PBA 5,000 Points Club member

Albert Henry "Ali" Peek (born February 13, 1975) is a Filipino-American former professional basketball player who played in the Philippine Basketball Association (PBA). During his playing days, he played mostly at the center position, although he was also used as a power forward occasionally.

== Early life ==
Peek was born in Hawaii but grew up in California. His Filipino mother Marlene, traces her roots in Manila. His grandfather, a member of the Philippine Constabulary, was from Tuguegarao, while his grandmother was from Ilocos Norte. His biological father is French Creole. Growing up, he watched Lakers games and played basketball in the parks.

== High school career ==
Peek played for Hart High School in his high school years. As a senior, he averaged 24.2 points and 15 rebounds, led Hart to a 17–10 record and was an All-star selection, All-Valley forward and Foothill League MVP. In the title game against Schurr High School, he had a career-high 40 points and a school-record 23 rebounds. However, he struggled academically, scoring the NCAA-required 700 on the Scholastic Aptitude Test (SAT) after three previous attempts.

== College ==
In 1992, Peek committed to St. Mary's College of California. He was coached by Ernie Kent and was teammates with actor Mahershala Ali.

He played for St. Mary's College varsity team that represented and won for the United States the 1994 R. Williams Jones Cup championship in Taipei. This would be his introduction to Asian basketball.

In his senior year, Peek suffered a microfracture in his knee and doctors said he had a 50-50 chance of playing like he used to. He thought of joining the military but because he wanted to play, he worked on rehabbing his knee. He was then contacted by his high school coach’s friend Maury Hanks, who put him in touch with Filipino player agent Bobby Rius who told me him he could play in the PBA as a local.

== PBL ==
In 1996, he played with AMA Cybertigers, as a 21-year-old amateur player in the Philippine Basketball League (PBL). As this was his first time playing in the country, his Filipino relatives helped him adjust to life in the Philippines.

== PBA career ==
=== Pop Cola Panthers ===
Peek entered the PBA in 1998, after being drafted third overall by the now-defunct Pop Cola Panthers. He was the Panthers' leading scorer, rebounder and shot-blocker. During this time, he lived with his relatives in Cubao.

In his sophomore season, he was the 12th leading scorer in the league, fourth in field goal percentage, fifth in rebounding, and seventh in blocks.

=== Alaska Aces ===
At the start of the 2001 PBA season, he was traded along with Jon Ordonio, to the rebuilding Alaska Aces for then-Alaska franchise player Johnny Abarrientos and Poch Junio. During his time with the Aces, Peek's career blossomed despite the team falling short of winning a championship. In his first two years with the Aces, Alaska's decision to go "younger" paid off. Surrounded by talented youngsters John Arigo, Mike Cortez and Brandon Cablay during the 2003-04 season, Peek won Best Player of the Conference honors in the 2003 Invitational Cup including a championship against his former team which was, during that time, named the Coca-Cola Tigers. The following conference, he underwent a knee operation that caused him to most of the conference. In the off-season, he was also given a three-year contract extension worth P13.5 million.

=== Coca-Cola Tigers ===
In 2005, Peek was traded back along with Arigo to his former team, the Coca-Cola Tigers in exchange for former Alaska player Jeffrey Cariaso and big man Reynel Hugnatan. During the 2005 Fiesta Conference, he scored a conference-high 27 points in an upset rout over the Talk 'N Text Phone Pals. He finished the season as the second-best field goal shooter in the league.

The following season, Peek hit a clutch jumper that tied the game with 1:02 remaining in their Fiesta Conference match against the San Miguel Beermen. His import teammate Alex Carcamo then had the game-winning tip-in basket. They met again in the survivor playoffs, where SMB eliminated them in two games. In the 2006 Philippine Cup, he scored 21 points in a win over the Air21 Express. The next game, which was against his former team Alaska, he went 12-of-12 from the field for 27 points and the win. This was the highest number of attempts without a miss in league history. He also had five rebounds, two assists, one block and three free throws in 32 minutes of action. For that performance, he earned co-Players of the Week honors along with Ginebra's Mark Caguioa. The Tigers then got their third straight win against Barangay Ginebra. In a win over the Sta. Lucia Realtors, he scored 29 points, his best in a Coca-Cola jersey. That season, he was an All-Star. However, he missed the All-Star Game due to an injury.

In the 2006–07 Philippine Cup, Peek had 19 points in an upset win over defending champions Purefoods Chunkee Giants. However, he missed a game due to a swollen left knee. He returned against Air21, but they still lost. They finished ninth for that conference. During the 2007 Fiesta Conference, he became the 55th member of the 5,000 points club.

=== Talk 'N Text Phone Pals / Tropang Texters ===
During the 2007–08 season, the Tigers traded Peek and a first round draft pick to Talk 'N Text in exchange for disgruntled star Asi Taulava. Talk 'N Text brought him in for his defense. This trade made them the "team to beat" for the 2008 Fiesta Conference, but they failed to make it past the wildcard phase and were eliminated early. He won the Sportsmanship Award that season. He also finished the season as second in the league in blocks per game.

Peek missed the start of the 2008–09 season due to a calf muscle injury. He made his season debut four games later with 16 points and seven rebounds in a win over Alaska. Talk 'N Text won that season's Philippine Cup.

The following season, they started the 2009–10 Philippine Cup 3–0, with Peek scoring 11 in a win over Sta. Lucia. He then made four clutch free throws and blocked a layup by Coca-Cola guard Alex Cabagnot to seal the win over them. He hit clutch free throws again this time in a win over Purefoods. At the end of the elimination round, he had led all players in blocked shots with 1.7 per game.

=== Sta. Lucia Realtors ===
Before the 2009–10 PBA season ended, the Sta. Lucia Realtors announced that the team had been put on sale and Peek was dealt to the Realtors in a controversial trade that involved Sta. Lucia stars Kelly Williams and Ryan Reyes. Peek played the few remaining games in Sta. Lucia before going back to Talk 'N Text at the start of the 2010–11 PBA season via trade.

=== Return to Talk 'N Text ===
==== 2010–11 season ====
Peek started the 2010–11 Philippine Cup by getting into a commotion with B-Meg Llamado Rico Maierhofer. He then had 15 points in a win over the Rain or Shine Elasto Painters. Against the Powerade Tigers, he had 18 points. In their rematch, he led Talk 'N Text with 21 points on 9-of-11 shooting to another win. He then had 25 points and a clutch block on Gabe Norwood in a winning rematch against Rain or Shine. He scored 25 again along with nine rebounds in a win over Barangay Ginebra. In those three games, he only missed thrice out of 30 attempts. They secured the first seed with a win over Air21. For those performances, the 35-year old was unanimously chosen as the PBA Player of the Week. To start the playoffs, he came off the bench to deliver 20 points and 14 rebounds to dispose of Rain or Shine in the quarterfinals. In the semis, they eliminated B-Meg in six games. He led the team with 19 points and 10 rebounds in Game 6 to close the series. In the finals, they beat the Beermen in six games, winning their third All-Filipino championship.

In the 2011 Commissioner's Cup, Peek contributed 17 points in a rout of SMB. Talk 'N Text made it to the Commissioner's Cup finals. There, they won in six games. In that season's Governors' Cup, they topped the elimination round. They made the finals against the Petron Blaze Boosters. In Game 2 of that series, he along with teammate Mark Yee and Petron player Jojo Duncil were assessed technical fouls each and ejected from the game. He was fined P2,600 for his actions while Duncil and Yee were fined P5,000 each. Talk 'N Text lost that series in the next five games. He made it to the Second Mythical Team.

==== 2011–12 season ====
Peek was shot prior to the start of the season, causing him to miss games. Initially, he thought of retiring, but his stepfather told him to get back to playing. He then flew to the US to get back to game shape and was cleared to play less than a month later. He returned to practice two months later. He returned to playing in a Game 1 win of their Philippine Cup series against Petron. The Texters won that series and moved to the finals, where they faced Powerade. There, they beat Powerade in five games, becoming the first back-to-back Philippine Cup champions in 27 years. In the Commissioner's Cup, he missed some games due to a right hand injury. The Texters continued their success as they beat the Barako Bull Energy for their fifth straight finals appearance. They lost to B-Meg in seven games.

==== 2012–13 season ====
The Texters made the Philippine Cup finals once again, even as Peek was considering retirement at 38 years old. In Game 4, he scored 15 points on 7-of-8 shooting, grabbed six rebounds, and had one shot block in 23 minutes as he helped the Tropang Texters waylay Rain or Shine for a finals sweep and their third successive all-Filipino championship. His minutes continued to dwindle that season due to knee problems.

==== 2013–14 season ====
Peek played nine games in the 2013–14 Philippine Cup. In those games, he averaged 4.0 points and 4.5 rebounds in helping the Tropang Texters reach the quarterfinals of the All-Filipino before losing to the San Mig Super Coffee Mixers. He was moved to the inactive roster due to an injury but also to clear a spot for 1998 Rookie of the Year Danny Seigle, who the team acquired through free-agency.

On February 26, 2014, Peek announced on Twitter his retirement from the PBA. A video tribute was given to him while he was covering the 2014 Commissioner's Cup. He had played for about 16 years in the league. He also retired as the 4th all-time leading offensive rebounder hauling down 2,010 offensive boards and top 10 in the total rebounds category grabbing a total of 5,158 rebounds in his career.

== National team career ==
Peek was never selected to be on the final rosters of the Philippine national team. In 2001, he was on Coach Ron Jacobs's wish list for the 2002 Asian Games. He made it to the 30-man pool for that tournament. The pool was then divided into two teams which competed in the 2002 Governors' Cup, with him joining the RP-Selecta Ice Cream. However, with one of his knees not feeling well after the conference, he was not given a spot on the team.

In 2005, Peek was chosen for the 30-man pool for the 2007 Asian Basketball Championships.

In 2007, Peek was among 15 players who played in that year's Jones Cup. They finished sixth out of eight teams in that tournament.

== Career statistics ==
=== PBA ===
Legend
GP	Games played	MPG	Minutes per game
FG%	Field-goal percentage	3P%	3-point field-goal percentage	FT%	Free-throw percentage
RPG	Rebounds per game	APG	Assists per game	SPG	Steals per game
BPG	Blocks per game	PPG	Points per game	**Bold**	Career high

Year	Team	GP	MPG	FG%	3P%	FT%	RPG	APG	SPG	BPG	PPG
1998	Pop Cola	52	32.1	.572	.000	.637	7.5	1.1	**.5**	1.1	10.2
1999	Pop Cola	28	38.3	.535	.000	.675	9.7	1.4	.4	1.5	12.7
2000	Pop Cola	34	38.2	.596	.000	.730	9.9	0.9	.4	1.1	14.8
2001	Alaska	46	**41.3**	.597	.000	**.755**	**11.0**	**2.1**	.3	1.3	**19.0**
2002	Alaska	28	24.3	.535	.000	.746	6.0	1.0	.3	.9	9.1
2003	Alaska	47	32.9	.551	.000	.702	8.8	1.5	**.5**	1.1	14.9
2004–05	Alaska	59	35.2	.554	.000	.681	8.7	1.6	.4	**1.7**	15.9
2004–05	Coca-Cola	59	35.2	.554	.000	.681	8.7	1.6	.4	**1.7**	15.9
2005–06	Coca-Cola	39	33.6	.514	.000	.625	9.1	2.0	.3	1.6	13.6
2006–07	Coca-Cola	40	37.4	.503	.000	.711	9.0	.8	.4	1.4	14.0
2007–08	Coca-Cola	37	26.6	.498	.000	.596	8.1	.5	.4	1.4	9.0
2007–08	Talk 'N Text	37	26.6	.498	.000	.596	8.1	.5	.4	1.4	9.0
2008–09	Talk 'N Text	42	24.6	.582	.000	.725	6.7	.5	.2	1.3	8.1
2009–10	Talk 'N Text	35	22.8	.574	.000	.633	6.5	.4	.3	1.2	8.6
2009–10	Sta. Lucia	35	22.8	.574	.000	.633	6.5	.4	.3	1.2	8.6
2010–11	Talk 'N Text	**65**	23.2	**.600**	.000	.646	7.5	.4	.2	1.0	9.7
2011–12	Talk 'N Text	44	21.4	.559	.000	.620	6.8	.4	.2	.8	7.8
2012–13	Talk 'N Text	44	20.4	.527	.000	.716	4.8	.3	.2	.8	6.5
2013–14	Talk 'N Text	9	14.4	.400	.000	.444	4.6	.6	.1	0.4	4.0
Career		649	29.8	.554	.000	.683	8.0	1.0	0.3	1.2	11.6

=== College ===
Year	Team	GP	GS	MPG	FG%	3P%	FT%	RPG	APG	SPG	BPG	PPG
1992–93	Saint Mary's	23	**1**	9.1	.578	.000	.500	1.5	.2	**.3**	0.1	2.7
1993–94	Saint Mary's	23	0	**9.8**	.507	.000	.630	3.3	**.3**	.2	**.2**	3.8
1994–95	Saint Mary's	23	0	7.1	**.623**	.000	.579	1.7	.1	.2	.0	3.3
Career		69	0	8.7	.563	.000	.578	2.2	.2	.2	.1	3.3

== Coaching career ==
In 2015, Peek reunited became the assistant coach for the Filsports Basketball Association (FBA) team the Laguna BUSA Warriors. There he reunited with Pop Cola teammate Nic Belasco who was the team's head coach.

In 2017, Peek became an assistant coach for the NCAA team the Benilde Blazers, helping to train their big men. As of 2021, he no longer coaches the team.

== Player profile ==
Peek, despite standing only at 6 ft 4, was a presence in the low post. His physique earned him the nickname "The Man Mountain". With his wide frame and moves around the paint, he overpowered taller opponents. He was also very efficient in scoring, as he could score inside the paint or from mid-range. He was also a very good rebounder on both offense and defense, as proved by him retiring in the top 10 in rebounding and top 5 in offensive rebounding.

Peek was also a good defensive player. He finished the 2007–08 season as second in the league in blocks per game.

== Off the court ==
=== Shooting incident ===
On November 7, 2011, Peek was shot in the neck by an unidentified gunman at the parking lot of the RFM Sports Center in Pioneer in Mandaluyong. He was rushed to the hospital and was out of danger. Doctors later discovered that the bullet had entered the back of his neck and traveled in a curve, completely missing his carotid artery. He was cleared to play less than a month later and was able return to active play after the incident. A year later, two suspects were arrested by the police in Nueva Ecija. The two claimed they were paid P100,000 for a kill job but Peek's shooting was a case of mistaken identity. As of 2014, the bullet is still lodged in his skull, since surgery could prove critical to his condition.

=== As broadcaster ===
Peek currently works as a color commentator in the PBA. He had previously tried doing ABS-CBN's NCAA coverage. His Talk 'N Text head coach Chot Reyes, who was head of TV5's sports coverage at the time, offered him the job.

In 2014, Peek implied on air that Coach Yeng Guiao of Rain or Shine was ordering his players to make cheap shots against their opponents. Guiao called him out for those remarks. In 2018, his comments on the 2018 All-Star selections were reprimanded by the PBA Press Corps. He apologized on social media.

== Personal life ==
Peek currently works as a professional driver and dialysis technician in Las Vegas. He once lived in Manila with his girlfriend and their four children.

Despite Peek's intimidating features, he has a laid-back and friendly personality.
