= 2009–10 Coca-Cola Tigers season =

- Head coach: Kenneth Duremdes (October–November); Bo Perasol (November–August)
- General Manager: Bo Perasol
- Owner(s): Coca-Cola Bottlers Philippines, Inc.

Philippine Cup results
- Record: 6–12 (33.3%)
- Place: 7th (tied)
- Playoff finish: Wildcards (by Rain or Shine 99–84)

Fiesta Conference results
- Record: 8–10 (44.4%)
- Place: 7th
- Playoff finish: Wildcards (by Rain or Shine 98–93)

Coca-Cola Tigers seasons

The 2009–10 Coca-Cola Tigers season was the 8th season of the franchise in the Philippine Basketball Association (PBA).

== Key dates ==
- August 2: The 2009 PBA Draft took place in Fort Bonifacio, Taguig.

== Draft picks ==
Round	Pick	Player	Height	Position	Nationality	College
2	14	Francis Allera	6 ft. 4 in.	Forward	Philippines	UST
2	20	PJ Walsham	6 ft. 5 in.	Forward	Philippines	De La Salle

== Roster ==
2009–10 Coca-Cola Tigers roster
Players

Pos.	#	POB	Name	Height	Weight	DOB (YYYY–MM–DD)	From
SG	5	(Philippines)	R.J. Rizada	6 ft 2 in (1.88 m)	175 lb (79 kg)		Far Eastern
PF	7	(Philippines)	Ken Bono	6 ft 6 in (1.98 m)	230 lb (104 kg)		Adamson
SF	8	(Philippines)	Francis Allera	6 ft 4 in (1.93 m)	220 lb (100 kg)		UST
PG	12	(Philippines)	Marvin Cruz	5 ft 9 in (1.75 m)	160 lb (73 kg)		Philippines
PG	13	(Philippines)	Paolo Mendoza	5 ft 11 in (1.80 m)	170 lb (77 kg)		Philippines
PF	16	(Philippines)	Dennis Espino	6 ft 6 in (1.98 m)	215 lb (98 kg)		UST
PF	17	(Philippines)	Rodriguez, Larry	6 ft 4 in (1.93 m)	200 lb (91 kg)		PMI
SG	20	(Philippines)	Gary David	6 ft 2 in (1.88 m)	175 lb (79 kg)		Lyceum
SF	24	(Philippines)	Ricky Calimag	6 ft 5 in (1.96 m)	210 lb (95 kg)		San Beda
PG	26	(Philippines)	Chico Lanete	6 ft 0 in (1.83 m)	180 lb (82 kg)		Lyceum
SF	28	(Philippines)	Norman Gonzales	6 ft 4 in (1.93 m)	205 lb (93 kg)		San Beda
SF	34	(United States)	William Antonio	6 ft 4 in (1.93 m)	275 lb (125 kg)		Chaminade
SG	80	(Philippines)	Mark Macapagal	6 ft 3 in (1.91 m)	190 lb (86 kg)		San Sebastian
C	88	(Tonga)	Asi Taulava	6 ft 9 in (2.06 m)	275 lb (125 kg)		BYU–Hawaii

Coaches
Head coach
- Bo Perasol (Philippines)
Assistant(s)
- (Philippines) George Ella (UE)
- (United States) William Antonio (Chaminade)
- (United States) Alex Compton

Legend
- (DP) Unsigned draft pick
- (FA) Free agent
- (S) Suspended
- Injured

== Depth chart ==
Pos.	Starting 5	Bench 1	Bench 2
C	Asi Taulava	Dennis Espino	Ken Bono
PF	Norman Gonzales	Larry Rodriguez	Ricky Calimag
SF	William Antonio	Mark Macapagal
SG	Gary David	R.J. Rizada	Francis Allera
PG	Chico Lanete	Marvin Cruz	Paolo Mendoza

== Philippine Cup ==
=== Eliminations ===
==== Standings ====
Pos	Team	W	L	PCT	GB	Qualification
1	Alaska Aces	13	5	.722 (Note: Head-to-head record: Alaska 2–0 San Miguel)	—	Advance to semifinals
2	San Miguel Beermen	13	5	.722	—	Advance to semifinals
3	Purefoods Tender Juicy Giants	12	6	.667 (Note: Head-to-head record: Purefoods 1–1 Barangay Ginebra; Purefoods 0, Barangay Ginebra 0; overall point differential: Purefoods +85, Barangay Ginebra +75)	1	Advance to quarterfinals
4	Barangay Ginebra Kings	12	6	.667	1	Advance to quarterfinals
5	Talk 'N Text Tropang Texters	11	7	.611	2	Advance to quarterfinals
6	Sta. Lucia Realtors	10	8	.556	3	Advance to wildcard round
7	Coca-Cola Tigers	6	12	.333 (Note: Head-to-head record: Burger King 1–1, Coca-Cola; Burger King +10, Coca-Cola −10)	7	Advance to wildcard round
8	Burger King Whoppers	6	12	.333	7	Advance to wildcard round
9	Rain or Shine Elasto Painters	4	14	.222	9	Advance to wildcard round
10	Barako Bull Energy Boosters	3	15	.167	10	
—	Smart Gilas (G)	3	6	.333	5.5	Guest team (Note: Smart Gilas's results do not count in the standings.)

Source: PBA.ph
(G) Guests

==== Game log ====
===== Eliminations =====
2010 PBA Philippine Cup game log
October

Game	Date	Opponent	Score	High points	High rebounds	High assists	Location Attendance	Record
1	October 16	Sta. Lucia	76-95	Cabagnot (18)	Taulava (11)	Taulava (5)	Araneta Coliseum	0–1
2	October 18	Barako Bull	73-81	Espino (15)	Rodriguez (18)	Cabagnot (5)	Araneta Coliseum	0–2
3	October 23	Alaska	79-100	Cabagnot (15)	Cabagnot (8)	Cabagnot, Cruz (5)	Cuneta Astrodome	0–3
4	October 30	Purefoods	93-79	N. Gonzales (17)	W. Gonzales (7)	Cabagnot (6)	Araneta Coliseum	1–3

November

Game	Date	Opponent	Score	High points	High rebounds	High assists	Location Attendance	Record
5	November 6	Smart Gilas*	93-98				Cuneta Astrodome	
6	November 11	Talk 'N Text	94-103	Espino (21)	Espino (13)	Espino (4)	Araneta Coliseum	1–4
7	November 18	Burger King	97-106	Cabagnot (20)	N. Gonzales (7)	Cabagnot (5)	Araneta Coliseum	1–5
8	November 21	San Miguel	84-107	Macapagal (18)	Espino (8)	Ross (6)	Cebu City	1–6
9	November 25	Rain or Shine	84-92	Macapagal (16)	Rodriguez (13)	Cabagnot (9)	Araneta Coliseum	1–7
10	November 27	Barangay Ginebra	104-113	Macapagal (27)	Cabagnot, Bono (7)	Cabagnot, Ross (6)	Ynares Center	1–8

December

Game	Date	Opponent	Score	High points	High rebounds	High assists	Location Attendance	Record
11	December 2	Purefoods	79-88	Rodriguez (21)	Rodriguez (9)	Ross (4)	Araneta Coliseum	1–9
12	December 5	Talk 'N Text	104-107	Macapagal (23)	Espino (9)	Cabagnot (4)	General Santos	1–10
13	December 11	Sta. Lucia	92-98	Cabagnot (15)	Taulava (10)	Cabagnot (5)	Ynares Center	1–11
14	December 13	Burger King	106-94	Rodriguez (21)	Espino (11)	Cabagnot (13)	Araneta Coliseum	2–11
15	December 20	Alaska	103-92	Macapagal (19)	Taulava (12)	Taulava, Cabagnot (6)	Araneta Coliseum	3–11
16	December 25	Barangay Ginebra	97-106	Espino (21)	Taulava (16)	Cabagnot (7)	Cuneta Astrodome	3–12

January

Game	Date	Opponent	Score	High points	High rebounds	High assists	Location Attendance	Record
17	January 13	San Miguel	118-107	Taulava (27)	Taulava (15)	Ross (10)	Araneta Coliseum	4–12
18	January 15	Rain or Shine	105-83	Ross (18)	Taulava (14)	Taulava (8)	Araneta Coliseum	5–12
19	January 20	Barako Bull	91-89	Taulava (20)	Taulava (11)	Ross (7)	Cuneta Astrodome	6–12

2009–10 schedule

===== Playoffs =====
2010 PBA Philippine Cup playoffs game log
Wildcard

Game	Date	Opponent	Score	High points	High rebounds	High assists	Location Attendance	Record
1	January 24	Burger King	118-112	Macapagal (22)	Taulava (16)	Taulava (7)	Ynares Center	1–0
2	January 27	Rain or Shine	84-99	David (20)	Taulava (19)	Ross (4)	Ynares Center	1–1

2009–10 schedule

== Fiesta Conference ==
=== Eliminations ===
==== Standings ====
Pos	Team	W	L	PCT	GB	Qualification
1	Talk 'N Text Tropang Texters	15	3	.833	—	Advance to semifinals
2	San Miguel Beermen	13	5	.722 (Note: Second seed playoff: San Miguel 88, Derby Ace 83)	2	Advance to semifinals
3	Derby Ace Llamados	13	5	.722	2	Advance to quarterfinals
4	Alaska Aces	11	7	.611	4	Advance to quarterfinals
5	Barangay Ginebra Kings	9	9	.500 (Note: Fifth seed playoff: Barangay Ginebra 115, Rain or Shine 88)	6	Advance to quarterfinals
6	Rain or Shine Elasto Painters	9	9	.500	6	Advance to wildcard round
7	Coca-Cola Tigers	8	10	.444	7	Advance to wildcard round
8	Sta. Lucia Realtors	5	13	.278	10	Advance to wildcard round
9	Air21 Express	4	14	.222	11	Advance to wildcard round
10	Barako Energy Coffee Masters	3	15	.167	12	

Source: PBA.ph

==== Game log ====
2010 PBA Fiesta Conference game log
March

Game	Date	Opponent	Score	High points	High rebounds	High assists	Location Attendance	Record
1	March 24	Barako	97-74	David (17)	Taulava (9)	Rizada (4)	Araneta Coliseum	1–0
2	March 27	San Miguel	108-98	David (19)	Taulava (8)	Rizada (5)	Gingoog	2–0
3	March 31	Air21	100-96	David (21)	Rizada (8)	David (4)	Araneta Coliseum	3–0

April

Game	Date	Opponent	Score	High points	High rebounds	High assists	Location Attendance	Record
4	April 4	Ginebra	91-98	David (25)	David (8)	Ross (3)	Araneta Coliseum	3–1
5	April 14	Derby Ace	79-76	David (18)	Taulava (9)	Lanete (4)	Araneta Coliseum	4–1
6	April 16	Rain or Shine	80-91	Espino (11)	Taulava (11)	Taulava, Cruz, Gonzales (2)	Araneta Coliseum	4–2
7	April 21	Talk 'N Text	91-115	Lanete (17)	Taulava (6)	David (5)	Araneta Coliseum	4–3

May

Game	Date	Opponent	Score	High points	High rebounds	High assists	Location Attendance	Record
8	May 1	Sta. Lucia	94-108	David (26)	Taulava (6)	Lanete (7)	Cuneta Astrodome	4–4
9	May 7	Alaska	103-104	David (31)	Taulava (13)	David, Taulava (3)	Araneta Coliseum	4–5
10	May 14	Talk 'N Text	93-103	David (21)	Taulava (13)	Lanete (5)	Araneta Coliseum	4–6
11	May 19	Alaska	98-108	David (23)	Taulava (10)	Ross (6)	Araneta Coliseum	4–7
12	May 23	Derby Ace	91-104	David (26)	Gonzales (9)	Gonzales, Mendoza (2)	Araneta Coliseum	4–8
13	May 30	Barako	105-100	David (25)	Taulava (14)	Mendoza (3)	Araneta Coliseum	5–8

June

Game	Date	Opponent	Score	High points	High rebounds	High assists	Location Attendance	Record
14	June 4	Air21	102-104	David (29)	Taulava (17)	Mendoza (6)	Ninoy Aquino Stadium	5–9
15	June 13	Ginebra	96-95	David (16)	Taulava (10)	Cruz (4)	Ninoy Aquino Stadium	6–9
16	June 16	San Miguel	89-86	Taulava (15)	Cruz (9)	Cruz (7)	Araneta Coliseum	7–9
17	June 25	Sta. Lucia	87-76	David (22)	Taulava (10)	Cruz (6)	AC-tent	8–9
18	June 27	Rain or Shine	90-101	David (16)	Taulava (18)	David (6)	Araneta Coliseum	8–10

2009–10 schedule

Locals only

== Transactions ==
=== Pre-season ===
Coca-Cola Tigers

Players Added

Via Draft

- Francis Allera
- PJ Walsham

Via Free Agency

- Norman Gonzales (From Sta. Lucia)

Via Trade

- Ken Bono (From San Miguel)
- Jojo Duncil (From Barako Bull)
- Dennis Espino (From Sta. Lucia)
- Larry Rodriguez (From Barako Bull)
- Chris Ross (To Burger King)
Players Lost

Via Free Agency

- Leo Avenido
- Lawrence Bonus
- M.C. Caceres (To Barako Bull)
- Kalani Ferreria
- Mark Telan (To Rain or Shine)

Via Trade

- Nic Belasco (To Talk 'N Text)
- Ronjay Buenafe (To Burger King)
- Jason Misolas (From Sta. Lucia)

=== Season ===
Jan. 04, 2010	To Burger King Alex Cabagnot; Wesley Gonzales	To Coca Cola Gary David; Chico Lanete
May 19, 2010	To Sta. Lucia Chris Ross	To Coca Cola Paolo Mendoza

==== Imports recruited ====
Team	Player	Debuted	Final
Coca-Cola Tigers	James Penny (1/3)	March 24, 2010	May 7, 2010
Coca-Cola Tigers	Rashad Bell (2/3)	May 14, 2010	June 4, 2010
Coca-Cola Tigers	John Williamson (3/3)	June 13, 2010	July 4, 2010
