= Ricky Calimag =

Filipino basketball player

Personal information
- Born: June 10, 1978 (age 48) Isabela, Philippines
- Listed height: 6 ft 5 in (1.96 m)
- Listed weight: 210 lb (95 kg)

Career information
- College: San Beda
- PBA draft: 2001: 2nd round, 15th overall pick
- Drafted by: Tanduay Rhum Masters
- Playing career: 2001–2012
- Position: Power forward / small forward
- Number: 34

Career history
- 2001: Tanduay Rhum Masters
- 2004–2007: Sta. Lucia Realtors
- 2007–2012: Coca-Cola/Powerade Tigers

Recaredo Calimag (born June 10, 1978), better known as Ricky Calimag, is a Filipino former professional basketball player. He last played for the Powerade Tigers in the Philippine Basketball Association (PBA).

== PBA career statistics ==
Legend
GP	Games played	MPG	Minutes per game
FG%	Field-goal percentage	3P%	3-point field-goal percentage	FT%	Free-throw percentage
RPG	Rebounds per game	APG	Assists per game	SPG	Steals per game
BPG	Blocks per game	PPG	Points per game	**Bold**	Career high

=== Season-by-season averages ===
Year	Team	GP	MPG	FG%	3P%	FT%	RPG	APG	SPG	BPG	PPG
2001	Tanduay	8	4.1	.500	—	–	.8	.0	.0	.1	.5
2004–05	Sta. Lucia	15	11.1	.468	**1.000**	**1.000**	3.4	**.9**	.1	.1	3.3
2005–06	Sta. Lucia	37	**16.9**	.486	.000	.741	**4.5**	.5	**.3**	**.2**	**6.4**
2006–07	Sta. Lucia	**44**	10.0	.544	.273	.800	2.3	.2	.1	.1	4.1
2006–07	Coca-Cola	**44**	10.0	.544	.273	.800	2.3	.2	.1	.1	4.1
2007–08	Coca-Cola	20	14.6	**.732**	.403	.500	3.1	.5	.2	.1	6.1
2008–09	Coca-Cola	27	11.4	.402	.400	.737	2.4	.5	.0	.0	4.1
2009–10	Coca-Cola	26	10.5	.377	.176	.714	2.5	.1	.0	.0	4.2
2010–11	Powerade	20	6.7	.571	.200	**1.000**	1.8	.4	.1	.1	3.5
2011–12	Powerade	21	8.1	.333	.125	.846	2.1	.3	.1	.1	3.0
Career		218	11.2	.496	.339	.738	2.7	.4	.1	.1	4.3
