= 2011–12 Petron Blaze Boosters season =

- Head coach: Ato Agustin
- General Manager: Hector Calma
- Owner(s): Petron Corporation (a San Miguel Corporation subsidiary)

Philippine Cup results
- Record: 9–5 (64.3%)
- Place: 3rd
- Playoff finish: Semifinalist (eliminated by Talk 'N Text, 4-3)

Commissioner's Cup results
- Record: 3–6 (33.3%)
- Place: 9th
- Playoff finish: Did not qualify

Governors Cup results
- Record: 6–8 (42.9%)
- Place: 5th
- Playoff finish: Semifinalist

Petron Blaze Boosters seasons

The 2011–12 Petron Blaze Boosters season was the 37th season of the franchise in the Philippine Basketball Association (PBA).

== Key dates ==
- August 28: The 2011 PBA Draft took place in Robinson's Place Ermita, Manila.

== Draft picks ==
Round	Pick	Player	Position	Nationality	College
1	3	Chris Lutz	SF	United States	Marshall University
3	2	Filemon Fernandez	PG/SG	United States	Orange Coast College

== Roster ==
2011–12 Petron Blaze Boosters roster
Players
Coaches

Pos.	#	POB	Name	Height	Weight	DOB (YYYY–MM–DD)	From
G	2	(Philippines)	Dennis Miranda	6 ft 0 in (1.83 m)	185 lb (84 kg)	1982-07-14	Far Eastern
G/F	3	(United States)	Chris Lutz (R)	6 ft 3 in (1.91 m)	200 lb (91 kg)	1985-02-11	Marshall
C	4	(United States)	Dorian Peña	6 ft 6 in (1.98 m)	235 lb (107 kg)	1977-10-12	Coppin State
PG	5	(Philippines)	Alex Cabagnot	5 ft 10 in (1.78 m)	175 lb (79 kg)	1982-12-08	Hawaiʻi–Hilo
SG	7	(Philippines)	Dondon Hontiveros	6 ft 2 in (1.88 m)	170 lb (77 kg)	1977-06-01	Cebu
F/C	10	(Philippines)	Danny Ildefonso (C)	6 ft 6 in (1.98 m)	215 lb (98 kg)	1976-12-09	National-U
PG	11	(Philippines)	Jojo Duncil	6 ft 1 in (1.85 m)	178 lb (81 kg)	1983-01-13	UST
G/F	13	(United States)	Marcio Lassiter (injured) (R)	6 ft 2 in (1.88 m)	185 lb (84 kg)	1987-05-16	Cal State Fullerton
SG	18	(Philippines)	Joseph Yeo	5 ft 11 in (1.80 m)	170 lb (77 kg)	1983-09-07	De La Salle
F	23	(Philippines)	Jay Washington	6 ft 7 in (2.01 m)	220 lb (100 kg)	1981-11-10	Eckerd
C	24	(United States)	Robert Reyes	6 ft 6 in (1.98 m)	225 lb (102 kg)	1983-03-16	Flagler
G	26	(Philippines)	Chico Lanete	5 ft 10 in (1.78 m)	175 lb (79 kg)	1979-08-01	Lyceum
F/C	27	(Philippines)	Nonoy Baclao	6 ft 6 in (1.98 m)	190 lb (86 kg)	1987-06-15	Ateneo
G	28	(Philippines)	R.J. Rizada	6 ft 0 in (1.83 m)	170 lb (77 kg)	1982-10-05	Far Eastern
F	29	(Philippines)	Arwind Santos	6 ft 4 in (1.93 m)	170 lb (77 kg)	1981-06-10	Far Eastern
G	40	(Philippines)	Axel Doruelo (IN)	5 ft 10 in (1.78 m)	170 lb (77 kg)	1982-09-07	Philippines

Head coach

- (Philippines) Ato Agustin (Lyceum)

Assistant coach(es)

- (Philippines) Gee Abanilla (De La Salle)
- (Philippines) Freddie Abuda (Cebu)
- (Philippines) Jorge Gallent (Far Eastern)
- (Philippines) Pido Jarencio (UST)
- (United States) Bobby Parks (Memphis)
- (Philippines) Biboy Ravanes (Cebu)
- (Philippines) Olsen Racela (Ateneo)

Legend

- (C) Team captain
- (CI) Commissioner's Cup Import
- (GI) Governors' Cup Import
- (EI) EASL Import
- (DP) Unsigned draft pick
- (FA) Free agent
- (IN) Inactive
- (S) Suspended
- (R) Rookie
- Injured

== Philippine Cup ==
=== Eliminations ===
==== Standings ====
Pos	Team	W	L	PCT	GB	Qualification
1	B-Meg Llamados	10	4	.714 (Note: Head-to-head record: B-Meg 1–1 Talk 'N Text (B-Meg +8))	—	Twice-to-beat in the quarterfinals
2	Talk 'N Text Tropang Texters	10	4	.714	—	Twice-to-beat in the quarterfinals
3	Petron Blaze Boosters	9	5	.643 (Note: Head-to-head differential: Petron +8, Barangay Ginebra +1, Rain or Shine −9)	1	Best-of-three quarterfinals
4	Barangay Ginebra San Miguel	9	5	.643	1	Best-of-three quarterfinals
5	Rain or Shine Elasto Painters	9	5	.643	1	Best-of-three quarterfinals
6	Meralco Bolts	8	6	.571	2	Best-of-three quarterfinals
7	Barako Bull Energy Cola	6	8	.429 (Note: Head-to-head record: Barako Bull 1–1 Powerade (Barako Bull +35))	4	Twice-to-win in the quarterfinals
8	Powerade Tigers	6	8	.429	4	Twice-to-win in the quarterfinals
9	Alaska Aces	3	11	.214	7	
10	Shopinas.com Clickers	0	14	.000	10	

Source: PBA.ph

=== Bracket ===
Quarterfinals
(#1 twice-to-beat)
1	B-Meg	88	123
8	Powerade	97	131*
(Best-of-3)
4	Barangay Ginebra	0
5	Rain or Shine	2
(#2 twice-to-beat)
2	Talk 'N Text	81
7	Barako Bull	79
(Best-of-3)
3	Petron Blaze	2
6	Meralco	0

Semifinals (Best-of-7)
8	Powerade	4
5	Rain or Shine	3
2	Talk 'N Text	4
3	Petron Blaze	3

Finals (Best-of-7)
8	Powerade	1
2	Talk 'N Text	4

*Game went into overtime

=== Quarterfinals ===
==== Petron Blaze-Meralco series ====
December 16

Petron Blaze Boosters 91, Meralco Bolts 84

Smart Araneta Coliseum, Quezon City

December 21

Petron Blaze Boosters 80, Meralco Bolts 64
Petron wins series 2–0

Ynares Center, Antipolo

=== Semifinals ===
==== Talk 'N Text-Petron Blaze series ====
January 5

Talk 'N Text Tropang Texters 87, Petron Blaze Boosters 83

Cuneta Astrodome, Pasay

January 7

Talk 'N Text Tropang Texters 89, Petron Blaze Boosters 91

Smart Araneta Coliseum, Quezon City

January 9

Talk 'N Text Tropang Texters 93, Petron Blaze Boosters 95

Cuneta Astrodome, Pasay

January 11

Talk 'N Text Tropang Texters 82, Petron Blaze Boosters 85

Smart Araneta Coliseum, Quezon City

January 13

Talk 'N Text Tropang Texters 93, Petron Blaze Boosters 91

Smart Araneta Coliseum, Quezon City

January 15

Talk 'N Text Tropang Texters 111, Petron Blaze Boosters 108

Smart Araneta Coliseum, Quezon City

January 18

Talk 'N Text Tropang Texters 92, Petron Blaze Boosters 91
Talk 'N Text wins series 4–3

Cuneta Astrodome, Pasay

== Commissioner's Cup ==
=== Eliminations ===
==== Standings ====
Pos	Team	W	L	PCT	GB	Qualification
1	Talk 'N Text Tropang Texters	7	2	.778	—	Advance to semifinals
2	Barangay Ginebra Kings	6	3	.667 (Note: Second seed playoff: Barangay Ginebra 93–84 B-Meg)	1	Advance to semifinals
3	B-Meg Llamados	6	3	.667	1	Advance to quarterfinals
4	Alaska Aces	5	4	.556	2	Advance to quarterfinals
5	Barako Bull Energy Cola	4	5	.444 (Note: Head-to-head quotient: Barako Bull 1.04, Meralco 1.01, Powerade 0.95; sixth seed playoff: Meralco 102–98 Powerade)	3	Advance to quarterfinals
6	Meralco Bolts	4	5	.444	3	Advance to quarterfinals
7	Powerade Tigers	4	5	.444	3	
8	Rain or Shine Elasto Painters	3	6	.333 (Note: Head-to-head quotient: Rain or Shine 1.12, Petron 1.11, Air21 0.80)	4	
9	Petron Blaze Boosters	3	6	.333	4	
10	Air21 Express	3	6	.333	4	

Source: PBA.ph

== Governors' Cup ==
=== Eliminations ===
==== Standings ====
Pos	Team	W	L	PCT	GB	Qualification
1	Rain or Shine Elasto Painters	8	1	.889	—	Semifinal round
2	B-Meg Llamados	6	3	.667	2	Semifinal round
3	Talk 'N Text Tropang Texters	5	4	.556 (Note: Head-to-head differential: Talk 'N Text +18, Barangay Ginebra 0, Petron −18)	3	Semifinal round
4	Barangay Ginebra Kings	5	4	.556	3	Semifinal round
5	Petron Blaze Boosters	5	4	.556	3	Semifinal round
6	Meralco Bolts	4	5	.444 (Note: Head-to-head differential: Meralco +11, Barako Bull +8, Powerade −18; sixth seed playoffs: Powerade 99–95 Barako Bull, Meralco 94–86 Powerade)	4	Semifinal round
7	Powerade Tigers	4	5	.444	4	
8	Barako Bull Energy Cola	4	5	.444	4	
9	Alaska Aces	2	7	.222 (Note: Head-to-head record: Alaska 1–0 Air21)	6	
10	Air21 Express	2	7	.222	6	

Source: PBA.ph

== Transactions ==
=== Trades ===
==== Pre-season ====
August 28, 2011	To Petron Blaze 2011 1st round pick (Chris Lutz); Dondon Hontiveros; Carlo Sharma	To Barako Bull 2011 1st round pick (Dylan Ababou); Mick Pennisi; Sunday Salvacion future draft picks

==== Commissioner's Cup ====
March 20, 2012	To Petron Blaze Chico Lanete	To Barako Bull Marc Agustin

April 20, 2012	To Petron Blaze Marcio Lassiter; Celino Cruz	To Powerade Rabeh Al-Hussaini; Rey Guevarra; Lordy Tugade

May 1, 2012	To Petron Blaze Dorian Pena	To Barako Bull Celino Cruz; Carlo Sharma

=== Additions ===
Player	Signed	Former team
R.J. Rizada	March 20, 2012	San Miguel Beermen (ABL)
Chico Lanete	March 20, 2012	Barako Bull Energy
Dorian Pena	May 1, 2012(via trade)	Barako Bull Energy
Marcio Lassiter	April 20, 2012(via trade)	Petron Blaze Boosters

=== Subtractions ===
Player	Signed	Former team
Carlo Sharma	April 20, 2012	traded to Barako Bull
Rabeh Al-Hussaini	April 20, 2012	traded to Powerade
Rey Guevarra	April 20, 2012	traded to Powerade
Lordy Tugade	April 20, 2012	traded to Powerade

=== Recruited imports ===
Tournament	Name	Debuted	Last game	Record
Commissioner's Cup	Nick Fazekas	February 12 (vs. Barangay Ginebra)	March 16 (vs. Alaska)	3–4
Commissioner's Cup	Will McDonald	March 21 (vs. Barako Bull)	March 28 (vs. Talk 'N Text)	0–2
Governors Cup	Eddie Basden	May 20 (vs. Powerade)	June 29 (vs. Air21)	5-4
Governors Cup	Marcus Faison	July 6 (vs. Rain or Shine)	July 15 (vs. Meralco)	1–4
