= Francis Allera =

Filipino basketball player

Personal information
- Born: June 16, 1985 (age 41) Davao City, Philippines
- Listed height: 6 ft 4 in (1.93 m)
- Listed weight: 180 lb (82 kg)

Career information
- High school: DOLE Philippines School (Polomolok, South Cotabato)
- College: UST
- PBA draft: 2009: 2nd round, 13th overall pick
- Drafted by: Burger King Whoppers
- Playing career: 2009–2012
- Position: Small forward

Career history
- 2009–2012: Coca-Cola / Powerade Tigers

Francis Phillip A. Allera is a Filipino former professional basketball player. He last played for the Powerade Tigers in the Philippine Basketball Association (PBA). He played the small forward position.

== PBA career statistics ==
Legend
GP	Games played	MPG	Minutes per game
FG%	Field-goal percentage	3P%	3-point field-goal percentage	FT%	Free-throw percentage
RPG	Rebounds per game	APG	Assists per game	SPG	Steals per game
BPG	Blocks per game	PPG	Points per game	**Bold**	Career high

=== Season-by-season averages ===
Year	Team	GP	MPG	FG%	3P%	FT%	RPG	APG	SPG	BPG	PPG
2009–10	Coca-Cola	**29**	8.6	.354	**.385**	.200	1.7	.3	.1	.2	1.6
2010–11	Powerade	13	**10.7**	**.387**	.300	.000	**2.0**	**.5**	**.2**	**.3**	**2.1**
2011–12	Powerade	28	5.5	.375	.250	**.500**	1.3	.4	.1	.0	.8
Career		70	7.8	.369	.333	.250	1.6	.4	.1	.1	1.3
