= Marvin Cruz =

Filipino basketball player

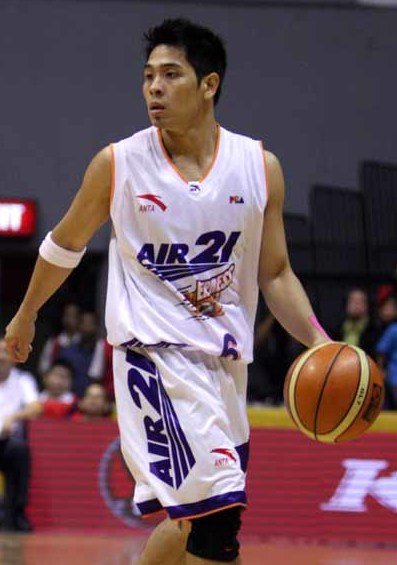
- Cruz in 2008

Personal information
- Born: December 31, 1984 (age 41)
- Listed height: 5 ft 8 in (1.73 m)
- Listed weight: 160 lb (73 kg)

Career information
- High school: UPIS (Quezon City)
- College: UP
- PBA draft: 2007: 2nd round, 14th overall pick
- Drafted by: Air21 Express
- Playing career: 2007–2013
- Position: Point guard

Career history
- 2007–2009: Air21 Express / Burger King Whoppers
- 2009–2010: Coca-Cola Tigers
- 2010–2011: Barako Bull Energy Boosters
- 2011–2012: Bangkok Cobras
- 2013: GlobalPort Batang Pier
Medals
Men's basketball
Representing Philippines
Gold medal – first place	2007 Nakhon Ratchasima	Team

Marvin Lu Cruz (born December 31, 1984) is a Filipino former professional basketball player in the Philippine Basketball Association (PBA). He is the older brother of Mark Cruz.

== Player Achievements ==
=== RP-Harbour Team ===
Cruz once played as starting point guard for the SEABA gold winner RP-Harbour Team.

He led the PBL in assists and made the Mythical Five, then he also made the All-Tournament team in the PBL Silver Cup while playing for Toyota Balintawak.

With UP Integrated School, he led his team to its first-ever UAAP juniors title in 2002, when he was also named Finals Most Valuable Player. He was also a Mythical Five member in the 69th UAAP season.

== PBA career statistics ==
Legend
GP	Games played	MPG	Minutes per game
FG%	Field-goal percentage	3P%	3-point field-goal percentage	FT%	Free-throw percentage
RPG	Rebounds per game	APG	Assists per game	SPG	Steals per game
BPG	Blocks per game	PPG	Points per game	**Bold**	Career high

=== Season-by-season averages ===
Year	Team	GP	MPG	FG%	3P%	FT%	RPG	APG	SPG	BPG	PPG
2007–08	Air21	**49**	10.5	.434	.263	.672	1.0	1.2	.4	.0	3.7
2008–09	Air21 / Burger King	41	11.8	.372	.071	**.795**	1.6	1.9	.4	.0	3.5
2009–10	Coca-Cola	37	**17.3**	**.543**	**.667**	.692	**2.5**	**2.5**	**1.0**	.0	**4.6**
2010–11	Barako Bull	13	16.3	.239	.200	.588	**2.5**	2.0	.6	.0	2.5
2012–13	GlobalPort	5	8.4	.286	.000	—	.4	.2	.4	.0	.8
Career		145	13.1	.424	.235	.703	1.7	1.8	.6	.0	3.7
