= 1998 PBA draft =

Player selection in Philippine basketball

General information
- Date(s): December 22, 1997
- Location: Glorietta Activity Center, Makati
- Network(s): VTV on IBC

Overview
- League: Philippine Basketball Association
- First selection: Danny Ildefonso (Shell)

The 1998 Philippine Basketball Association (PBA) rookie draft was an event at which teams drafted players from the amateur ranks. The annual rookie draft was held on December 22, 1997, at the Glorietta Mall in Makati.

== Round 1 ==
Pick	Player	Country of origin*	PBA team	College
1	Danilo Ildefonso	Philippines	Formula Shell Zoom Masters	National
2	Noy Castillo	United States	San Miguel Beermen	Citadel
3	Ali Peek	United States	Pop Cola 800s	Saint Mary's
4	Brixter Encarnacion	Philippines	Pop Cola 800s	San Sebastian
5	William Antonio	United States	San Miguel Beermen	Chaminade
6	Banjo Calpito	Philippines	Sta. Lucia Realtors	San Sebastian
7	Henry Fernandez	Philippines	Purefoods Carne Norte Beefies	Visayas
8	Steven Smith	United States	Gordon's Gin Boars	US International

== Round 2 ==
Pick	Player	Country of origin*	PBA team	College
9	Jasper Ocampo	Philippines	Pop Cola 800s	San Sebastian
10	Joel Dualan	Philippines	Formula Shell Zoom Masters	University of Manila
11	Braulio Lim	Philippines	Mobiline Phone Pals	UE
12	Stephen Antonio	United States	Alaska Milkmen	Arizona State
13	Oscar Simon	Philippines	San Miguel Beermen	University of Manila
15	Ulysses Tanique	Philippines	Purefoods Carne Norte Beefies	San Sebastian
16	Erwin Framo	Philippines	Gordon's Gin Boars	University of Manila

== Round 3 ==
Pick	Player	Country of origin*	PBA team	College
	Randy Alcantara	Philippines	Formula Shell Zoom Masters	Mapua Tech
	Terrence Bito	United States	Pop Cola 800s	Cal State-Northridge
	Tyrone Bautista	Philippines	Mobiline Phone Pals	De La Salle
	Patrick Benedicto	Philippines	Alaska Milkmen	Mapua Tech
	Juan Augustus Ramirez	Philippines	Purefoods Carne Norte Beefies	UST

== Round 4 ==
Pick	Player	Country of origin*	PBA team	College
	Jesse Cabanayan	Philippines	Pop Cola 800s	University of Baguio
	Melchor Crisostomo	Philippines	Formula Shell Zoom Masters	University of Manila
	Cristino Reynoso Jr.	Philippines	Alaska Milkmen	

== Notes ==
- The Formula Shell Zoom Masters traded first overall pick Danilo Ildefonso to the San Miguel Beermen in exchange for second overall pick Noy Castillo on draft day.
- Ginebra San Miguel traded the draft rights to Steven Smith to the San Miguel Beermen in exchange for Paul Alvarez.
- The San Miguel Beermen's fifth overall draft pick William Antonio and the Alaska Milkmen's twelfth overall draft pick Stephen Antonio are brothers.
