= Sean Anthony (basketball) =

Filipino-Canadian basketball player

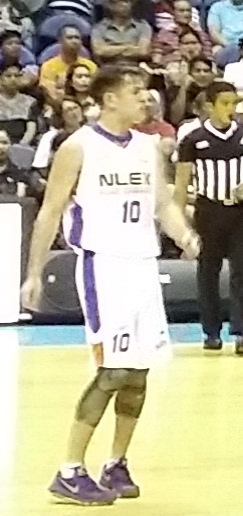

Personal information
- Born: January 26, 1986 (age 40) Vancouver, British Columbia, Canada
- Listed height: 6 ft 4 in (1.93 m)
- Listed weight: 202 lb (92 kg)

Career information
- College: McGill (2004–2008)
- PBA draft: 2010: 1st round, 6th overall pick
- Drafted by: Air21 Express
- Playing career: 2010–2025
- Position: Power forward / small forward

Career history
- 2010–2012: Powerade Tigers
- 2012–2013: Barako Bull Energy Cola
- 2013–2014: Talk 'N Text Tropang Texters
- 2014: Air21 Express
- 2014–2015: Meralco Bolts
- 2015–2017: NLEX Road Warriors
- 2017–2021: GlobalPort / NorthPort Batang Pier
- 2022: Phoenix Super LPG Fuel Masters
- 2023–2025: NLEX Road Warriors

Career highlights
- PBA Mythical First Team (2019); PBA Mythical Second Team (2016); PBA Defensive Player of the Year (2019); PBA All-Defensive Team (2019); PBA All-Rookie Team (2011); PBA All-Star Weekend Blitz Game co-MVP (2011)

Sean Michael Dee Anthony (born January 26, 1986) is a Filipino-Canadian former professional basketball player. He played for eight teams during his career in the Philippine Basketball Association (PBA). He was drafted sixth overall in 2010 by the Air21 Express but was immediately shipped to the Powerade Tigers on draft night. In his rookie year, he won the Rookie Sophomore Blitz game MVP. He played for 8 teams in 15 years in the PBA.

== College career ==
Sean Anthony finished his varsity career at McGill where he was a physical education major. At McGill, Anthony had a reputation as a defensive stopper and slasher.

== Professional career ==
After two seasons with the Tigers, he was then traded to Barako Bull Energy Cola on 2012 PBA draft night in exchange for Aldrech Ramos, who was the 5th pick by Barako Bull.

After a season with Barako Bull, he was again traded to Talk 'N Text in exchange for Jared Dillinger. And just recently, before the end of the 2013–14 PBA Philippine Cup elimination round, he was traded again along with Eliud Poligrates and a 2016 first-round pick to Air21 Express in exchange for Niño Canaleta.

On September 12, 2014, he was sent to Meralco Bolts in a three-way trade involving NLEX Road Warriors and Blackwater Elite. NLEX obtained Blackwater's 2016 and 2017 2nd-round pick along with the draft rights for Juneric Baloria. Blackwater received Sunday Salvacion and Jason Ballesteros.

On September 30, 2015, Anthony was traded by the Meralco Bolts to the Mahindra Enforcer for 2016 and 2017 2nd-round picks and then he was immediately traded to the NLEX Road Warriors for Juneric Baloria & 2016 2nd-round pick. On October 28, 2015, Anthony scored 11 points and grabbed a career-high 19 rebounds in a 93–85 win over his former team, the Barako Bull. In a game against TNT, he had a career-high 32 points.

On October 14, 2016, Anthony was recognized during the PBA Leo Awards Night as he was named to the PBA Mythical Second Team.

In the 2017 Commissioner's Cup, Anthony was traded with Bradwyn Guinto for draft picks to the GlobalPort Batang Pier in a four-team trade. He debuted for GlobalPort with 18 points. In the 2019 Philippine Cup, he had 7 steals to go with his 22 points and 9 rebounds in a win against NLEX. He finished that season with Defensive Player of the Year and was named to the Mythical First Team. During the 2020 PBA season, he had a triple-double against Phoenix.

On November 5, 2021, Anthony, along with Sean Manganti, was traded to the Phoenix Super LPG Fuel Masters for Vic Manuel and Michael Calisaan.

On January 18, 2023, Anthony was traded back to the NLEX Road Warriors in a three-team trade involving NLEX, Phoenix, and TNT Tropang Giga.

On September 15, 2025, Anthony announced his retirement via LinkedIn.

== PBA career statistics ==
Legend
GP	Games played	MPG	Minutes per game	FG%	Field-goal percentage
3FG%	3-point field-goal percentage	4P%	4-point field-goal percentage	FT%	Free-throw percentage
RPG	Rebounds per game	APG	Assists per game	SPG	Steals per game
BPG	Blocks per game	PPG	Points per game	127	Career high

As of the end of 2024–25 season

=== Season-by-season averages ===
Year	Team	GP	MPG	FG%	3P%	4P%	FT%	RPG	APG	SPG	BPG	PPG
2010–11	Powerade	21	19.6	.421	.233	—	.618	5.4	1.7	.7	.2	7.6
2011–12	Powerade	48	25.0	.383	.283	—	.642	6.3	2.4	1.1	.1	9.1
2012–13	Barako Bull	33	23.3	.423	.333	—	.699	5.1	1.9	.9	.1	9.0
2013–14	Talk 'N Text	23	21.4	.417	.309	—	.762	5.0	.9	.9	.1	8.6
2013–14	Air21	23	21.4	.417	.309	—	.762	5.0	.9	.9	.1	8.6
2014–15	Meralco	40	21.2	.363	.255	—	.680	5.3	1.9	1.0	.1	7.2
2015–16	NLEX	35	31.8	.465	.287	—	.704	9.2	2.4	.8	.1	15.0
2016–17	NLEX	31	27.5	.403	.319	—	.669	8.8	2.5	1.0	.2	11.4
2016–17	GlobalPort	31	27.5	.403	.319	—	.669	8.8	2.5	1.0	.2	11.4
2017–18	GlobalPort / NorthPort	33	31.8	.421	.356	—	.700	8.4	3.8	2.0	.4	16.3
2019	NorthPort	35	33.6	.410	.291	—	.759	7.6	3.8	2.4	.3	16.4
2020	NorthPort	4	28.0	.357	.316	—	.710	8.5	5.5	1.8	—	14.5
2021	NorthPort	8	24.5	.394	.185	—	.778	6.8	2.1	1.5	—	10.6
2022–23	Phoenix Super LPG	26	23.6	.428	.365	—	.606	5.9	2.6	1.2	.0	10.2
2022–23	NLEX	26	23.6	.428	.365	—	.606	5.9	2.6	1.2	.0	10.2
2023–24	NLEX	21	19.8	.394	.339	—	.703	4.1	2.0	.9	—	7.1
2024–25	NLEX	5	11.3	.450	.200	—	.200	3.0	.6	.2	—	4.0
Career		363	25.6	.412	.308	—	.691	6.6	2.4	1.2	.1	10.9
