= R.J. Rizada =

Filipino basketball player

Imus Bandera
- Title: Assistant coach
- League: MPBL

Personal information
- Born: October 5, 1982 (age 44) Davao City, Philippines
- Listed height: 6 ft 1 in (1.85 m)
- Listed weight: 175 lb (79 kg)

Career information
- High school: Holy Cross Academy of Sasa (Davao City)
- College: FEU
- PBA draft: 2006: 2nd round, 12th overall pick
- Drafted by: Coca-Cola Tigers
- Playing career: 2006–2013
- Position: Shooting guard
- Coaching career: 2024–present

Career history

Playing
- 2006–2011: Coca-Cola/Powerade Tigers
- 2012: San Miguel Beermen (ABL)
- 2012: Petron Blaze Boosters

Coaching
- 2024–present: Imus Braderhood / Bandera (assistant)

Ryan Joseph Ramos Rizada (born October 5, 1982) is a Filipino professional basketball coach and former player. He currently serving as an assistant coach for the Imus Bandera of the Maharlika Pilipinas Basketball League (MPBL). He was the twelfth overall pick in the 2006 PBA Draft. He played for the Ateneo de Davao Blue Knights for a year and was recruited by the Far Eastern University Tamaraws after he was scouted in the university games.

== PBA career statistics ==
Legend
GP	Games played	MPG	Minutes per game
FG%	Field-goal percentage	3P%	3-point field-goal percentage	FT%	Free-throw percentage
RPG	Rebounds per game	APG	Assists per game	SPG	Steals per game
BPG	Blocks per game	PPG	Points per game	**Bold**	Career high

=== Season-by-season averages ===
Year	Team	GP	MPG	FG%	3P%	FT%	RPG	APG	SPG	BPG	PPG
2006–07	Coca-Cola	1	2.0	.000	.000	.000	.0	.0	.0	.0	.0
2007–08	Coca-Cola	4	12.3	**.556**	**1.000**	**1.000**	1.0	**1.8**	**.3**	**.3**	3.8
2008–09	Coca-Cola	21	11.1	.388	.214	.714	1.8	.7	**.3**	.1	2.9
2009–10	Coca-Cola	**37**	**17.2**	.504	.389	.512	**2.7**	1.2	**.3**	.1	**5.5**
2010–11	Powerade	24	11.4	.422	.000	.500	1.9	.8	**.3**	.1	2.7
2011–12	Petron	2	6.0	.000	—	**1.000**	1.0	.0	.0	.0	1.0
Career		89	13.6	.455	.316	.561	2.1	1.0	.3	.1	3.9
