= Marcio Lassiter =

Filipino-American basketball player

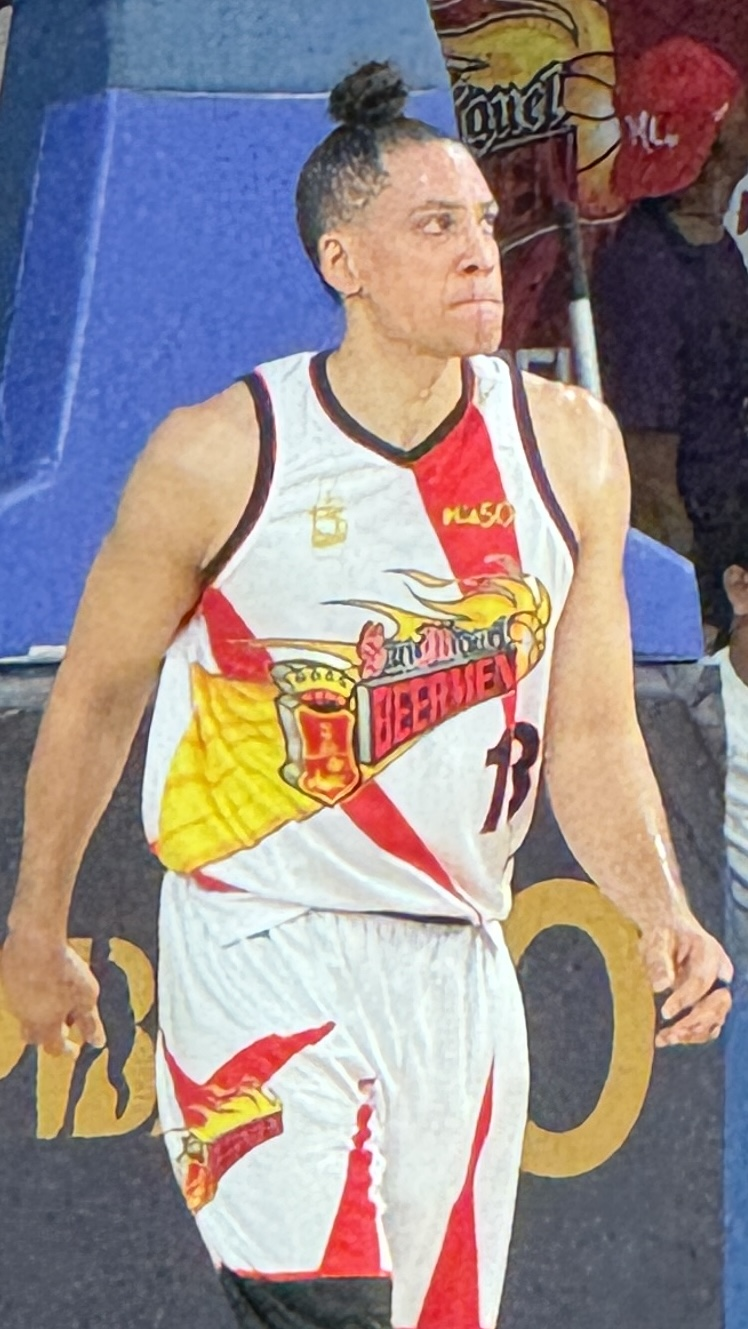
- Lassiter with the San Miguel Beermen in 2026

No. 13 – San Miguel Beermen
- Position: Small forward / shooting guard
- League: PBA

Personal information
- Born: May 16, 1987 (age 39) San Francisco, California, U.S.
- Listed height: 6 ft 2 in (1.88 m)
- Listed weight: 185 lb (84 kg)

Career information
- High school: George Washington (San Francisco, California)
- College: CC of San Francisco (2005–2007); Cal State Fullerton (2007–2009)
- PBA draft: 2011: 1st round, 4th overall pick
- Drafted by: Powerade Tigers
- Playing career: 2011–present

Career history
- 2011–2012: Powerade Tigers
- 2012–present: Petron Blaze Boosters / San Miguel Beermen

Career highlights
- 12× PBA champion (2014–15 Philippine, 2015 Governors', 2015–16 Philippine, 2016–17 Philippine, 2017 Commissioner's, 2017–18 Philippine, 2019 Philippine, 2019 Commissioner's, 2022 Philippine, 2023–24 Commissioner's, 2025 Philippine, 2025–26 Philippine); 8× PBA All-Star (2012–2014, 2017–2019, 2023, 2024); PBA Mythical First Team (2018); PBA All-Defensive Team (2013); PBA All-Rookie Team (2012); PBA Comeback Player of the Year (2013)

Marcio Tsongo Sandio Eshabarr Lassiter (born May 16, 1987) is a Filipino-American professional basketball player for the San Miguel Beermen of the Philippine Basketball Association (PBA). He had a stint with the Philippine national basketball team, the Smart Gilas. Considered the best all-around sharpshooter in the PBA when Smart Gilas played as a guest team in the league, Lassiter plays the swingman position. He graduated and played college basketball for Cal State Fullerton.

== High school career ==
Lassiter played for the George Washington High Eagles and Coach Jeremy Lee in San Francisco. He was a four-year varsity letterman who earned All-Academic Athletic Association honors three times. He also was all-district as a senior as a power forward and center and all-city as a sophomore and junior as a shooting guard. As a senior, he averaged 20 points and 9 rebounds. He turned down a walk-on offer at the University of San Francisco to continue his basketball career at the community college level.

=== Recruiting ===
College recruiting
Name	Hometown	School	Height	Weight	Commit date
Marcio Lassiter; SF / SG	San Francisco, CA	George Washington	6 ft 3 in (1.91 m)	185 lb (84 kg)	Nov 9, 2006
Marcio Lassiter; SF / SG	Recruit ratings: Rivals:				

Recruitment ranking Rivals.com. Retrieved August 3, 2011.

== College career ==
=== City College of San Francisco ===
Lassiter was named Co-Most Valuable Player of the Coast to Conference North in 2006–07 for the CCSF Rams, who were ranked No. 4 in the state going into the playoffs and finished 28–6. He earned second-team Northern California all-state honors, and was ranked among the Top 100 JC players in California. As a freshman, he averaged 12 points per game and as a sophomore, he averaged 14 points. In 2007, his team lost in the 2007 Regional playoffs to West Hills, 80–79. Lassiter's junior college coach Justin Labagh at City College of San Francisco said, "Marcio brings consistency to the team – he is always ready to play, he has a basketball sense that realizes that shooting is just one part of the game, he is a complete player."

=== California State University Fullerton ===
For the 2007–2008 season, Lassiter transferred from San Francisco City College to play at Cal State-Fullerton. Lassiter played in 32 of the team's 33 games, and was selected Most Improved Player by his teammates. He scored a season-high 17 points in a season-high 25 minutes vs. UC Riverside, making 5-of-9 shots, including 3-of-6 from 3-point territory. He did not miss a free throw all season, making 18 of 18. On the Labor Day Weekend tour to British Columbia, he was the Titans' No. 2 scorer at 12.7 points per game and grabbed 4.0 rebounds to go with 1.5 assists. During his first year at CSUF, the team won the NCAA Big West Conference title and qualified for the NCAA Men's Basketball Championship Tournament for just the second time in the school's history. However they ended up losing in the first round to the much taller and bigger no. 3 seeded team of the Wisconsin Badgers. In his Senior year, Lassiter received the Lyle Parks Jr., Hustle Award from the Titan Athletics Club, and his teammates voted him the Andrew Awad Toughness Award, named in honor of the late former Titan player. He was described by Titans coach Bob Burton as "a tremendous defender (and) a really outstanding shooter."

== Professional career ==
He moved to the Philippines in October 2009 and was the overall #1 pick of the PBL drafted by Magnolia. Because of the fall through of the PBL, Marcio was then picked up by Smart Gilas Pilipinas National Team. In the 2011 Commissioner's Cup, and due to the leave of absence by Barako Bull Energy Boosters in Philippine Basketball Association, Smart Gilas the team with whom he has been playing for, was the replacement of the Barako Bull team. Playing in 13 games, Lassiter averaged 38 minutes per game (#1 in the league), 13.5 points per game (#14 in the league), 36.9% (24/65) from the 3-point line (#17 in the league), #10 in the league for most points over all (176 total) with a game high of 22, 3.08 assists per game (#16 in the league), 1.15 steals per game (#9 in the league) and 5.31 rebounds per game. He was ranked #16 overall in efficiency at 30.79%

=== Entering the PBA draft ===
On July 28, 2011, Marcio Lassiter was one of the first 10 applicants for the 2011 PBA draft. At that time, there had been no announcements regarding an extension of the Smart Gilas Pilipinas National program. It was not until August 16, 2011, that an extension of the program was revealed. Gilas management revealed the names of those targeted to be retained, which included Lassiter. Despite word that offers were set to take place that next day, nothing was done to retain any of the players initially mentioned, and they were even given the "OK" to continue with the draft. This was quite unfortunate for the Smart Gilas program, as many of the players were waiting for an offer and still undecided with a chance to pull out of the draft. On August 28, 2011, Lassiter was selected 4th overall in the draft by Powerade Tigers. Smart Gilas teammate JVee Casio was also chosen by the Tigers as the first overall pick.

=== Powerade Tigers (2011–2012) ===
The team finished with 6 wins and 8 losses and ranked 8th after the elimination in the 2011–12 Philippine Cup. With teammate Gary David averaging almost 30 points per game during the playoffs, they had managed to beat the B-Meg Llamados, the first-seeded team in two games. The combination of Casio, Lassiter and David also beat the Yeng Guiao-led Rain or Shine Elasto Painters in the semifinals in seven games. They entered the finals with a heavy underdog tag against the Chot Reyes-mentored Talk 'N Text Tropang Texters. They lost the Finals to Talk 'N Text, 4–1.

He was one of the starters for the RSJ team alongside Smart Gilas teammates JV Casio, Dylan Ababou and Chris Lutz alongside B-Meg point guard Josh Urbiztondo for the 2012 All-Star Game.

=== Petron Blaze Boosters / San Miguel Beermen (2012–present) ===
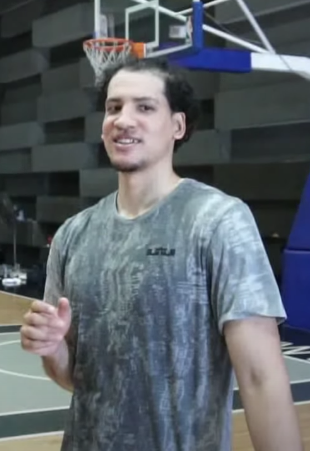
Lassiter in 2018

On April 20, 2012, the Philippine Basketball Association approved the trade in which Powerade sent Marcio Lassiter and Celino Cruz to the Petron Blaze Boosters for Rey Guevarra, Rabeh Al-Hussaini, and Lordy Tugade. However, an injury prevented him to play for the entire duration of the 2012 PBA Governors Cup. He played his first game as a Booster, on October 26, 2012, at the final minute of their contest against GlobalPort through a 3-pointer. The next game, Lassiter only scored 5 points on 2-for-7 from the field. He misses his five 3-point attempts in that game in a loss to the Air21 Express. On November 14, Lassiter recorded his first double-figure scoring output with 12 points to go along with 2 rebounds in 21 minutes of playing time on a 96–86 win over the Rain or Shine Elasto Painters.

In the 2014–15 Philippine Cup, Lassiter helped San Miguel win its twentieth franchise title after defeating Alaska in a hard-fought seven-game series. The title was also Lassiter's first championship in the PBA. Lassiter had previously been in the PBA Finals twice with Powerade in the 2011–12 Philippine Cup and with San Miguel, his current team in the 2013 Governors' Cup.

On May 17, 2015, Lassiter recorded 24 points, 5 rebounds, 2 assists and 5 3-pointers in a 102–124 win over the NorthPort Batang Pier. The following game, Lassiter has a woeful shooting night, only scoring 6 points on 2-for-10 (.200) from the field but the Beermen manages to win over the Purefood Star Hotshots, 100–89. On July 2, 2015, Lassiter scored 22 points, grabbed 7 rebounds and made 4 3-pointers as the Beermen got Game 1 of the 2015 PBA Governors' Cup Semifinals against the Rain or Shine Elasto Painters. On July 4, Lassiter got his career high of 10/13 3-point shooting for 31 points in a losing effort against Rain or Shine in game 2 of the semifinals.

On September 15, 2024, Marcio Lassiter officially broke the record of all-time three-pointers made previously owned by Jimmy Alapag.

== Career statistics ==
=== PBA ===
Legend
GP	Games played	MPG	Minutes per game	FG%	Field-goal percentage
3FG%	3-point field-goal percentage	4P%	4-point field-goal percentage	FT%	Free-throw percentage
RPG	Rebounds per game	APG	Assists per game	SPG	Steals per game
BPG	Blocks per game	PPG	Points per game	127	Career high

As of the end of 2025–26 season

==== Season-by-season averages ====
Year	Team	GP	MPG	FG%	3P%	4P%	FT%	RPG	APG	SPG	BPG	PPG
2011–12	Powerade	38	37.2	.412	.367	—	.776	6.0	3.8	1.4	.5	17.1
2011–12	Petron	38	37.2	.412	.367	—	.776	6.0	3.8	1.4	.5	17.1
2012–13	Petron	45	29.2	.427	.453	—	.733	3.5	2.0	.8	.1	12.1
2013–14	Petron / San Miguel	37	30.9	.383	.356	—	.671	3.5	2.5	.8	.1	12.6
2014–15	San Miguel	51	31.1	.390	.398	—	.772	3.8	2.2	.7	.2	11.8
2015–16	San Miguel	56	33.5	.414	.411	—	.794	4.2	2.5	1.0	.5	13.0
2016–17	San Miguel	58	36.7	.393	.351	—	.752	4.8	3.1	1.2	.4	14.5
2017–18	San Miguel	56	36.9	.400	.355	—	.831	4.1	3.3	1.4	.6	15.2
2019	San Miguel	47	31.0	.386	.347	—	.813	3.6	2.7	1.0	.2	11.2
2020	San Miguel	12	36.6	.387	.381	—	.926	2.9	2.9	1.1	.2	15.9
2021	San Miguel	32	31.2	.422	.425	—	.842	3.2	1.9	.9	.1	10.3
2022–23	San Miguel	58	31.4	.450	.425	—	.863	2.6	2.1	.8	.2	11.9
2023–24	San Miguel	42	28.4	.454	.469	—	.778	2.9	1.8	.7	.2	10.0
2024–25	San Miguel	55	26.4	.390	.400	.500	.891	2.4	1.6	.5	.1	8.5
2025–26	San Miguel	54	24.3	.422	.423	.250	.800	2.4	1.4	.8	.0	8.4
Career		641	32.2	.408	.393	.346	.788	3.6	2.4	.9	.3	12.1

=== National team ===
Year	Team	GP	MPG	FG%	3P%	FT%	RPG	APG	SPG	BPG	PPG
2011 FIBA Asia Championship	Philippines	6	32.0	.323	.217	.500	4.83	1.33	1.17	0.17	8.33

== International career ==
With Lassiter playing for Smart Gilas, he was a member of the Philippines men's national basketball team that was bannered by collegiate and amateur standouts whose ultimate goal was to reach the 2012 London Olympics. He participated in the FIBA Asia Stanković Cup 2010, represented the team in the 2010 Asian Games Basketball Tournament and also made a huge impact in the 2011 FIBA Asia Champions Cup that took place in Manila.

Lassiter guarding Kobe Bryant during the Smart Ultimate All-Star Weekend in 2011

In a rare event due to the NBA lockout, the Smart Ultimate All-Star Weekend took place at the Smart Araneta Coliseum. Marcio scored 9 points in their game against the Smart All-Stars (Kobe Bryant, JaVale McGee, Kevin Durant, James Harden, Tyreke Evans, Derrick Williams, Derrick Rose, Chris Paul, and Derek Fisher).

=== Team achievements ===
- 2011 William Jones Cup participant (Smart Gilas Pilipinas)
- 2011 William Jones Cup 3rd-place finish (Smart Gilas Pilipinas)
- 2011 Southeast Asian Basketball Championships participant (Smart Gilas Pilipinas)
- 2011 Southeast Asian Basketball Championships 1st-place finish (Smart Gilas Pilipinas)
- 2011 FIBA Asia Champions Cup participant (Smart Gilas Pilipinas)
- 2011 FIBA Asia Champions Cup 4th-place finish (Smart Gilas Pilipinas)
- 2011 PBA Commissioner's Cup participant (Smart Gilas Pilipinas)
- 2011 PBA Commissioner's Cup 3rd-place finish (Smart Gilas Pilipinas)
- 2010 Asian games participant (Smart Gilas Pilipinas)
- 2010 Asian games 6th-place finish (Smart Gilas Pilipinas)
- 2010 MVP Champions Cup participant (Smart Gilas Pilipinas)
- 2010 MVP Champions Cup 1st-place finish (Smart Gilas Pilipinas)
- 2010 FIBA Asia Stanković Cup participant (Smart Gilas Pilipinas)
- 2010 FIBA Asia Stanković Cup 4th-place finish (Smart Gilas Pilipinas)

== Personal life ==
Marcio was born on May 16, 1987, in San Francisco. His mother is Alexandria Eshabarr, whose father is from Santiago, Ilocos Sur. He has an older brother named Jolinko who is the Boys' Varsity Head Basketball Coach at George Washington High School (San Francisco). He currently lives in Manila with his US-born Filipina wife, Jerlyn Lassiter (née Pangilinan) and their five children, Montaé Izaiyah, Myles Elaijah, Marcel Josaiah, Melo Zekaiah and Jhenyne Malaiyah Leinani. Lassiter graduated with a Bachelor of Science degree in kinesiology. His family is also related to the Filipino comedian Joey Guila, who has been the mainstay opener for Jo Koy.
