= Dennis Espino =

Filipino basketball player

Personal information
- Born: December 20, 1973 (age 52) Angeles City, Philippines
- Listed height: 6 ft 6 in (1.98 m)
- Listed weight: 215 lb (98 kg)

Career information
- College: UST
- PBA draft: 1995: 1st round1st overall
- Drafted by: Sta. Lucia Realtors
- Playing career: 1995–2011
- Position: Power forward / center

Career history
- 1995–2009: Sta. Lucia Realtors
- 2009–2011: Powerade Tigers

Career highlights
- 2× PBA champion (2001 Governors', 2007–08 Philippine); PBA Defensive Player of the Year (2005); PBA Finals Most Valuable Player (2007–08 Philippine); 4× PBA All-Star (1996, 1999, 2003–2004); 2× PBA Mythical First Team (2001, 2003); 2× PBA All-Defensive Team (2001, 2005); 2× UAAP Most Valuable Player (1993, 1994); 2× PBL Most Valuable Player (1993 Pres. Fidel V. Ramos, 1994 Invitational)
Medals
Men's basketball
Representing Philippines
Asian Games
Bronze medal – third place	1998 Bangkok	Team
William Jones Cup
Gold medal – first place	1998 Taipei	Team

Dennis Espino (born December 20, 1973) is a Filipino retired professional basketball player in the Philippine Basketball Association (PBA). He was drafted first overall by Sta. Lucia in 1995 PBA draft.

== Player Profile ==
Espino is known for his physical inside play and is considered is a cornerstone of the Sta. Lucia franchise. Being a Realtor since his rookie year, he has helped the team win two PBA championships. After playing under the shadows of Jun Limpot for seven years, Dennis Espino became the heart-and-soul of Sta. Lucia when his celebrated teammate was sent to Ginebra via a trade with Marlou Aquino in 2000. The former UAAP MVP showed signs that he is capable of the responsibility after braving the role as the team's go-to-guy. In 2009, after playing 14 years with the team, Sta. Lucia traded him to the Coca-Cola Tigers. In 2011, Powerade Tigers traded him to Talk 'N Text Tropang Texters.

He also played for the Philippine Centennial Team in 1998.

== Arrest ==
In 2012, Espino was arrested by the police in Arayat, Pampanga and accused of serious illegal detention and possession of firearms. The charges arrest stemmed from a complaint by his former secretary, Mildred Eiman, who accused the player of locking her up for over a month for her failure to pay a debt amounting to P5,000. He eluded arrest for more than eight months, which according to the police was due to his political connections in Pampanga.

== Coaching career ==
After a long and controversial absence, Espino said he is happy to be back in the game of basketball.

He showed up at PBA D-League games as one of the assistant coaches of expansion team Derulo Accelero, three years since playing his last game in the pro league where he was among its biggest stars for close to two decades.

During that absence, Espino also became a fugitive of the law and also spent time in jail for a serious illegal detention case filed by a former secretary in a piggery he put up in Mexico, Pampanga. He declined to talk about the case that led to his disappearance from the cage scene, but said he was happy to be once again involved in a sport where he first made a name as the star of the multi-titled University of Santo Tomas teams in the 90's.

== PBA career statistics ==
Legend
GP	Games played	MPG	Minutes per game
FG%	Field-goal percentage	3P%	3-point field-goal percentage	FT%	Free-throw percentage
RPG	Rebounds per game	APG	Assists per game	SPG	Steals per game
BPG	Blocks per game	PPG	Points per game	**Bold**	Career high

=== Season-by-season averages ===
Year	Team	GP	MPG	FG%	3P%	FT%	RPG	APG	SPG	BPG	PPG
1995	Sta. Lucia	44	35.1	.462	.333	.710	6.3	1.2	.4	.8	14.7
1996	Sta. Lucia	44	31.7	.463	**1.000**	.656	6.7	1.5	.5	.9	12.4
1997	Sta. Lucia	**61**	31.6	**.506**	.000	.708	5.8	1.1	.3	**1.1**	12.7
1998	Sta. Lucia	33	40.2	.477	.000	.640	**8.6**	2.4	**.7**	.7	17.4
1999	Sta. Lucia	40	39.2	.432	.286	.731	8.0	1.6	.6	1.0	13.5
2000	Sta. Lucia	43	37.1	.411	.176	.751	7.4	1.9	.5	.3	14.7
2001	Sta. Lucia	49	**40.9**	.439	.265	.727	7.8	2.1	.4	.5	15.8
2002	Sta. Lucia	10	31.5	.438	.250	.708	6.6	2.1	.2	.4	13.5
2003	Sta. Lucia	49	38.5	.453	.250	**.791**	8.1	**3.2**	.4	.7	**18.3**
2004–05	Sta. Lucia	58	35.2	.426	.286	.764	**8.6**	2.7	.4	.7	15.6
2005–06	Sta. Lucia	34	28.9	.401	.083	.753	7.0	2.5	.4	.5	13.7
2006–07	Sta. Lucia	40	25.2	.461	.333	.762	5.1	2.1	.4	.7	11.5
2007–08	Sta. Lucia	52	24.2	.432	.366	.710	4.6	1.5	.2	.4	10.6
2008–09	Sta. Lucia	43	27.3	.374	.292	.707	5.3	2.3	.4	.5	9.7
2009–10	Coca-Cola	40	22.8	.421	.400	.756	5.3	1.4	.3	.3	9.1
2010–11	Powerade	29	19.9	.389	.250	.611	4.0	1.2	.1	.5	6.0
Career		669	32.2	.441	.276	.727	6.6	1.9	.4	.6	13.2
