= William Antonio =

Filipino-American basketball player

Personal information
- Born: August 15, 1975 (age 51) San Luis Obispo, California
- Listed height: 6 ft 3 in (1.91 m)
- Listed weight: 190 lb (86 kg)

Career information
- College: Chaminade (1994–1996)
- PBA draft: 1998: 1st round, 5th overall pick
- Drafted by: San Miguel Beermen
- Playing career: 1998–2007, 2010–2013
- Position: Small forward / shooting guard
- Coaching career: 2007–2010

Career history

Playing
- 1998–1999: San Miguel Beermen
- 1999–2001: Pop Cola Panthers
- 2002–2007, 2010–2012: Coca-Cola / Powerade Tigers
- 2012–2013: GlobalPort Batang Pier

Coaching
- 2007–2010: Coca-Cola Tigers (assistant)

Career highlights
- 2x PBA champion (2002 All-Filipino, 2003 Reinforced); PBA 3-Point Shootout Champion (2006)

William J. Heath Antonio (born August 15, 1975) is a Filipino-American former professional basketball player. He last played for the GlobalPort Batang Pier in the Philippine Basketball Association (PBA). A good three-point shooter, he was drafted 5th overall by the San Miguel Beermen in 1998. He was then sent to the Pop Cola 800s. He retired in 2007 to become a member of the coaching staff of the Coca-Cola Tigers. After working as an assistant coach for the Tigers, for 3 years, he returned to active play during the 2010 PBA Fiesta Conference.

== PBA career statistics ==
Legend
GP	Games played	MPG	Minutes per game
FG%	Field-goal percentage	3P%	3-point field-goal percentage	FT%	Free-throw percentage
RPG	Rebounds per game	APG	Assists per game	SPG	Steals per game
BPG	Blocks per game	PPG	Points per game	**Bold**	Career high

=== Season-by-season averages ===
Year	Team	GP	MPG	FG%	3P%	FT%	RPG	APG	SPG	BPG	PPG
1998	San Miguel	23	14.3	**.426**	.286	.688	1.2	1.4	.3	.0	3.4
1999	San Miguel	23	15.1	.369	.208	.818	2.1	.8	.2	.1	3.3
1999	Pop Cola	23	15.1	.369	.208	.818	2.1	.8	.2	.1	3.3
2000	Pop Cola	15	**31.2**	.411	.373	.778	4.7	**2.6**	.3	.1	**9.7**
2001	Pop Cola	48	28.7	.368	.293	.654	3.1	1.3	.4	.1	6.7
2002	Coca-Cola	43	27.2	.408	.325	.593	3.5	1.4	.4	.1	7.3
2003	Coca-Cola	**57**	14.7	.328	.250	.742	2.3	1.1	.4	.1	3.4
2004–05	Coca-Cola	53	17.1	.380	.347	.742	2.5	1.1	.4	.0	4.3
2005–06	Coca-Cola	38	28.4	.385	.351	.562	**5.8**	1.6	**.7**	.0	8.5
2006–07	Coca-Cola	37	27.1	.361	.343	.733	5.1	1.2	.5	.1	7.6
2009–10	Coca-Cola	3	12.0	.000	—	.500	1.3	.7	.0	.0	.3
2010–11	Powerade	28	21.3	.424	**.404**	.778	5.5	1.4	.5	.1	5.3
2011–12	Powerade	32	15.5	.362	.245	.700	3.0	1.3	.5	**.2**	3.7
2012–13	GlobalPort	17	12.2	.373	.333	**1.000**	2.1	.9	.3	.1	3.7
Career		417	21.2	.378	.321	.696	3.4	1.3	.4	.1	5.5
