= List of Powerade Tigers seasons =

Legend
Champion

Runner-up

Semifinalist

This is a list of seasons by the Powerade Tigers of the Philippine Basketball Association.

== Three-conference era ==
Season	Conference	Team name	Elimination round						Playoffs	
Season	Conference	Team name	Finish	GP	W	L	PCT	GB	Stage	Results
2002	Governors Cup	Coca-Cola Tigers	2nd/12	11	8	3	.727	1	Quarterfinals; Semifinals; 3rd-place playoff	Coca-Cola** 75, Sta. Lucia 65; Purefoods 3, Coca-Cola 2 Coca-Cola 75, San Miguel 63*
2002	Commissioner's Cup	Coca-Cola Tigers	5th/11	10	6	4	.600	1	Quarterfinals	San Miguel** def. Coca-Cola in 2 games
2002	All-Filipino Cup	Coca-Cola Tigers	3rd/10	9	6	3	.667	2	Quarterfinals; Semifinals; Finals	Coca-Cola 64, Sta. Lucia 61; Coca-Cola 2, San Miguel 1 Coca-Cola 3, Alaska 1
2003	All-Filipino Cup	Coca-Cola Tigers	2nd/Grp B	18	11	7	.611	3	Quarterfinals; Semifinals; Finals	1st in Group B (3–0); Coca-Cola 3, Sta. Lucia 1 Talk 'N Text 4, Coca-Cola 2
2003	Invitational Cup	Coca-Cola Tigers	2nd/Grp B	4	3	1	.750	1	Semifinals; Finals	Coca-Cola 91, FedEx 83*; Alaska 2, Coca-Cola 1
2003	Reinforced Conference	Coca-Cola Tigers	2nd/Grp B	13	11	2	.846	--	Quarterfinals; Semifinals; Finals	Coca-Cola 2, Barangay Ginebra 1 Coca-Cola 3, Talk 'N Text 0 Coca-Cola 4, San Miguel 3
Elimination round				65	45	20	.692	—	5 semifinal appearances	
Playoffs				47	30	17	.638	—	4 Finals appearances	
Cumulative totals				112	75	37	.670	—	2 championships	

== Two-conference era ==
Season	Conference	Team name	Elimination/classification round						Playoffs	
Season	Conference	Team name	Finish	GP	W	L	PCT	GB	Stage	Results
(2004)	Fiesta Conference	Coca-Cola Tigers	3rd/10	18	11	7	.611	5	Quarterfinals; Semifinals; 3rd-place playoff	1st in Group B (3–0); Red Bull 2, Coca-Cola 1 Talk 'N Text 113, Coca-Cola 104*
2004-05	Philippine Cup	Coca-Cola Tigers	7th/10	18	8	10	.444	5	Did not qualify	
2004-05	Fiesta Conference	Coca-Cola Tigers	9th/10	18	6	12	.333	6	Wildcard phase	Alaska** 86, Coca-Cola 66
2005-06	Fiesta Conference	Coca-Cola Tigers	9th/9	16	6	10	.375	4	Survivor playoffs	Coca-Cola 69, San Miguel** 67; San Miguel** 85, Coca-Cola 82 (OT)
2005-06	Philippine Cup	Coca-Cola Tigers	5th/9	16	7	9	.438	5	5th-seed playoff Quarterfinals	Coca-Cola 87, Air21 73*; Alaska 3, Coca-Cola 1
2006-07	Philippine Cup	Coca-Cola Tigers	9th/10	18	5	13	.278	8	Wildcard phase	4th overall (6–15), 3rd at wildcards (1–2)
2006-07	Fiesta Conference	Coca-Cola Tigers	7th/10	18	7	11	.389	6	1st wildcard round 2nd wildcard round	Coca-Cola 100, Purefoods 97*; San Miguel 102, Coca-Cola 101*
2007-08	Philippine Cup	Coca-Cola Tigers	9th/10	18	7	11	.389	5	1st wildcard round 2nd wildcard round Quarterfinals	Coca-Cola 81, Talk 'N Text 73*; Coca-Cola 109, Air21 102*; Alaska 2, Coca-Cola 0
2007-08	Fiesta Conference	Coca-Cola Tigers	4th/10	18	10	8	.556	2	Quarterfinals	Magnolia 2, Coca-Cola 1
2008-09	Philippine Cup	Coca-Cola Tigers	9th/10	18	7	11	.389	5	1st wildcard round	San Miguel 99, Coca-Cola 89*
2008-09	Fiesta Conference	Coca-Cola Tigers	8th/10	14	6	8	.429	5	8th-seed playoff Wildcard phase	Coca-Cola 81, Alaska 74*; Sta. Lucia 94, Coca-Cola 88*
2009-10	Philippine Cup	Coca-Cola Tigers	7th/10	18	6	12	.333	7	1st wildcard round 2nd wildcard round	Coca-Cola 118, Burger King 112*; Rain or Shine 99, Coca-Cola 84*
2009-10	Fiesta Conference	Coca-Cola Tigers	7th/10	18	8	10	.444	7	1st wildcard round 2nd wildcard round	Coca-Cola 100, Sta. Lucia 84; Rain or Shine 98, Coca-Cola 93
Elimination/classification round				226	94	132	.416	—	4 post-wildcard appearances	
Playoffs				36	16	21	.432	—	0 Finals appearances	
Cumulative totals				263	110	153	.418	—	0 championships	

*one-game playoffs
**team had the twice-to-beat advantage

== Three-conference era ==
Season	Conference	Team name	Elimination round						Playoffs	
Season	Conference	Team name	Finish	GP	W	L	PCT	GB	Stage	Results
2010-11	Philippine Cup	Powerade Tigers	9th/10	14	3	11	.214	8	Did not qualify	
2010-11	Commissioner's Cup	Powerade Tigers	9th/10	9	2	7	.222	6	Did not qualify	
2010-11	Governors Cup	Powerade Tigers	6th/9	8	4	4	.500	2	Did not qualify	
2011-12	Philippine Cup	Powerade Tigers	8th/10	14	6	8	.429	4	Quarterfinals; Semifinals; Finals	Powerade def. B-MEG** in 2 games Powerade 4, Rain or Shine 3 Talk 'N Text 4, Powerade 1
2011-12	Commissioner's Cup	Powerade Tigers	7th/10	9	4	5	.444	3	6th-seed playoff	Meralco 102, Powerade 98*
2011-12	Governors Cup	Powerade Tigers	8th/10	9	4	5	.444	4	1st elim. playoff 2nd elim. playoff	Powerade 99, Barako Bull 95*; Meralco 94, Powerade 86*
Elimination round				63	23	40	.365	—	1 semifinal appearance	
Playoffs				17	8	9	.471	—	1 Finals appearance	
Cumulative records				80	31	49	.388	—	0 championships	

*one-game playoffs
**team had the twice-to-beat advantage

== Cumulative records ==
Era	GP	W	L	PCT
Three-conference era (1975–2003)	112	75	37	.670
Two-conference era (2004–2010)	263	110	153	.418
Three-conference era (2010–2012)	80	31	49	.388
Total	455	216	239	.475
