= Mark Macapagal =

Filipino basketball player (born 1979)

Member of the San Simon, Pampanga's Municipal Council
- Incumbent
- Assumed office June 30, 2025
- In office June 30, 2019 – June 30, 2022

Personal details
- Born: Mark Pineda Macapagal; September 20, 1979 (age 47) Macabebe, Pampanga, Philippines
- Party: Independent (2025–present)
- Other political affiliations: Reporma (2021–2022); PDP–Laban (2018–2021)
- Occupation: Professional athlete
- Basketball career

Personal information
- Listed height: 6 ft 2 in (1.88 m)
- Listed weight: 185 lb (84 kg)

Career information
- College: San Sebastian
- PBA draft: 2005: , 18th overall pick
- Drafted by: Talk 'N Text Phone Pals
- Playing career: 2005–2015
- Position: Shooting guard / small forward
- Number: 80

Career history
- 2005–2007: Barangay Ginebra Kings
- 2007–2011: Coca-Cola/Powerade Tigers
- 2011–2012: Meralco Bolts
- 2013–2014: Barako Bull Energy
- 2014: GlobalPort Batang Pier
- 2014–2015: Meralco Bolts

Career highlights
- PBA champion (2006–07 Philippine); 4x PBA 3-point Shootout champion (2010–2012, 2014)

Mark P. Macapagal (born September 20, 1979 in Pampanga) is a Filipino former professional basketball player and politician. He last played with the Meralco Bolts. He plays the shooting guard and small forward positions.

== Basketball career ==
After playing in Ginebra where he impressed many with his good outside shooting, Macapagal was involved in a four-team trade that sent him to Coca-Cola.

In the 2009–10 season, he stepped up as the primary scorer for the Coca-Cola Tigers as he averaged 11 points, 1.8 rebounds, 1.9 assists in 25.5 minutes. However, his performance was not enough for Coca-Cola to advance to the playoffs.

== Political career ==
Macapagal ran for municipal councilor in his native San Simon, Pampanga in 2019 and won. In 2020, Pampanga governor Dennis Pineda placed Macapagal, 5 other councilors, and the municipal mayor under preventive suspension for anomalies in regards to the town's purchase of land near the municipal hall. In 2022, Macapagal ran for vice mayor but was defeated. In 2024, the Department of the Interior and Local Government ordered Macapagal to pay fines equivalent to the six month salaries due to simple neglect of duty and simple misconduct. In 2025, he ran again for municipal councilor as independent and won.

== PBA career statistics ==
Legend
GP	Games played	MPG	Minutes per game
FG%	Field-goal percentage	3P%	3-point field-goal percentage	FT%	Free-throw percentage
RPG	Rebounds per game	APG	Assists per game	SPG	Steals per game
BPG	Blocks per game	PPG	Points per game	**Bold**	Career high

=== Season-by-season averages ===
Year	Team	GP	MPG	FG%	3P%	FT%	RPG	APG	SPG	BPG	PPG
2005–06	Barangay Ginebra	44	16.0	**.432**	**.436**	.775	2.0	.8	.4	.1	5.9
2006–07	Barangay Ginebra	**48**	14.9	.330	.314	.746	1.6	.7	.4	.1	5.6
2007–08	Barangay Ginebra	39	21.7	.360	.375	.824	2.2	1.0	.5	.1	7.7
2007–08	Coca-Cola	39	21.7	.360	.375	.824	2.2	1.0	.5	.1	7.7
2008–09	Coca-Cola	35	22.1	.396	.314	.746	2.7	1.1	.9	**.2**	8.4
2009–10	Coca-Cola	37	**25.3**	.386	.329	.796	**2.9**	1.3	**1.0**	**.2**	**10.8**
2010–11	Powerade	31	19.7	.294	.234	.672	1.8	**1.9**	.8	**.2**	6.7
2011–12	Meralco	41	17.1	.332	.307	.796	1.7	.8	.5	.0	4.8
2012–13	Barako Bull	24	22.5	.323	.311	.750	1.7	.9	.7	.1	6.6
2013–14	Barako Bull	29	16.8	.340	.308	**.857**	1.6	.8	.6	.1	6.1
2013–14	GlobalPort	29	16.8	.340	.308	**.857**	1.6	.8	.6	.1	6.1
2014–15	Meralco	24	9.8	.352	.329	.804	.9	.4	.5	.0	5.2
Career		352	18.6	.356	.333	.777	2.0	1.0	.6	.1	6.8
