= 2011 PBA Governors' Cup =

- Duration: June 11 – August 21, 2011
- TV partner(s): Solar Sports (Studio 23), Basketball TV (Local); The Filipino Channel (International)

Finals
- Champions: Petron Blaze Boosters
- Runners-up: Talk 'N Text Tropang Texters

Awards
- Best Player: Arwind Santos (Petron Blaze Boosters)
- Best Import: Arizona Reid (Rain or Shine Elasto Painters)
- Finals MVP: Arwind Santos (Petron Blaze Boosters)

PBA Governors' Cup chronology
- < 2002 2012 >

PBA conference chronology
- < 2011 Commissioner's 2011–12 Philippine >

The 2011 Philippine Basketball Association (PBA) Governors' Cup is the third and last conference of the 2010-11 PBA season. The tournament started on June 11 and ended on August 21. The Barako Bull Energy Boosters have extended their leave of absence and Smart Gilas declined to join the season ending conference.

The tournament featured a handicapping system in which will be based on the results of the Philippine Cup and Commissioner's Cup (60% for the Philippine Cup and 40% for the Commissioner's Cup). The top four teams will be allowed with an import with a 6'2" height limit. The next four teams will be allowed with a 6'4" import and the last two teams will be allowed with a 6'6" import.

== Format ==
The following format will be observed for the duration of the conference:

- Single-round robin eliminations; 8 games per team; Teams are then seeded by basis on win–loss records. Ties are broken among points differences of the tied teams.
- The top six teams after the eliminations will advance to the semifinals.
- Semifinals will be a single round-robin affair with the remaining six teams. Results from the eliminations will be carried over. A playoff incentive for a finals berth will be given to the team that will win at least four of their five semifinal games that does not finish within the top two.
- The top two teams (or the #1 team and the winner of the playoff between team with at least 4 semifinal wins and the #2 team) will face each other in a best-of-seven championship series.

== Elimination round ==
=== Team standings ===
Pos	Team	W	L	PCT	GB	Qualification
1	Talk 'N Text Tropang Texters	6	2	.750	—	Semifinal round
2	Petron Blaze Boosters	5	3	.625 (Note: Head-to-head differential: Petron +10, Alaska +5, Barangay Ginebra −15)	1	Semifinal round
3	Alaska Aces	5	3	.625	1	Semifinal round
4	Barangay Ginebra Kings	5	3	.625	1	Semifinal round
5	Rain or Shine Elasto Painters	4	4	.500 (Note: Head-to-head differential: Rain or Shine +11, B-Meg 0, Powerade −11)	2	Semifinal round
6	B-Meg Derby Ace Llamados	4	4	.500	2	Semifinal round
7	Powerade Tigers	4	4	.500	2	
8	Meralco Bolts	3	5	.375	3	
9	Air21 Express	0	8	.000	6	

Source: PBA.ph

=== Schedule ===
Team ╲ Game	1	2	3	4	5	6	7	8
Air21	ROS	PET	POW	ALA	MER	BGK	BML	TNT
Alaska	TNT	MER	BML	A21	PET	POW	ROS	BGK
B-Meg Derby Ace	ROS	POW	ALA	MER	TNT	PET	BGK	A21
Barangay Ginebra	POW	PET	MER	TNT	A21	BML	ALA	ROS
Meralco	PET	ALA	BGK	BML	A21	ROS	TNT	POW
Petron Blaze	MER	A21	BGK	ROS	ALA	BML	TNT	POW
Powerade	BGK	BML	A21	TNT	ROS	ALA	PET	MER
Rain or Shine	BML	A21	TNT	PET	POW	MER	ALA	BGK
Talk 'N Text	ALA	ROS	POW	BML	BGK	PET	MER	A21

= Win; = OT win; = Loss; = OT loss

== Semifinal round ==
=== Team standings ===
Overall standings
Pos	Team	W	L	PCT	GB	Qualification
1	Talk 'N Text Tropang Texters	9	4	.692	—	Finals
2	Petron Blaze Boosters	8	5	.615 (Note: Head-to-head differential: Petron +13, Alaska +6, Barangay Ginebra −19)	1	Finals
3	Alaska Aces	8	5	.615	1	
4	Barangay Ginebra Kings	8	5	.615	1	
5	Rain or Shine Elasto Painters	6	7	.462	3	
6	B-Meg Derby Ace Llamados	5	8	.385	4	

Source: PBA.ph
Notes:

Semifinal round standings
Pos	Team	W	L
1	Petron Blaze Boosters	3 (Note: Head-to-head differential: Petron +30, Talk 'N Text +15, Barangay Ginebra −16, Alaska −29)	2
2	Talk 'N Text Tropang Texters	3	2
3	Barangay Ginebra Kings	3	2
4	Alaska Aces	3	2
5	Rain or Shine Elasto Painters	2	3
6	B-Meg Derby Ace Llamados	1	4

Source: PBA.ph

=== Results ===
Team	ALA	BGK	BMEG	PET	ROS	TNT
Alaska Aces		77–81	105–86	88–81	95–89	85–103
Barangay Ginebra Kings			99–79	88–96*	103–95	90–102
B-Meg Llamados				92–97	99–98	89–101
Petron Blaze Boosters					86–102	98–83
Rain or Shine Elasto Painters						96–81
Talk 'N Text Tropang Texters						

Legend: Blue = left column team win; Red = top row team win.
Matches with lighter background shading were decided after overtime.

== Finals ==
Solar

August 7

Talk 'N Text Tropang Texters 88, Petron Blaze Boosters 89

Smart Araneta Coliseum, Quezon City

Solar

August 10

Talk 'N Text Tropang Texters 103, Petron Blaze Boosters 85

Mindanao Civic Center Gymnasium, Tubod, Lanao del Norte

Solar

August 12

Talk 'N Text Tropang Texters 132, Petron Blaze Boosters 105

Smart Araneta Coliseum, Quezon City

Solar

August 14

Talk 'N Text Tropang Texters 83, Petron Blaze Boosters 105

Smart Araneta Coliseum, Quezon City

Solar

August 17

Talk 'N Text Tropang Texters 80, Petron Blaze Boosters 93

Smart Araneta Coliseum, Quezon City

Solar

August 19

Talk 'N Text Tropang Texters 104, Petron Blaze Boosters 78

Smart Araneta Coliseum, Quezon City

Solar

August 21

Talk 'N Text Tropang Texters 73, Petron Blaze Boosters 85
Petron Blaze wins series, 4–3

Smart Araneta Coliseum, Quezon City

== Imports ==
The following is the list of imports, which had played for their respective teams at least once, with the returning imports in italics. Highlighted are the imports who stayed with their respective teams for the entire conference.

Team	Import height limit	Name	Debuted	Last game	Record
Air21 Express	6'4"	(Libya) Alpha Bangura	June 15 (vs. Rain or Shine)	July 17 (vs. Talk 'N Text)	0-8
Alaska Aces	6'4"	(United States) Jason Forte	June 15 (vs. Talk 'N Text)	August 3 (vs. Rain or Shine)	7-5
Barangay Ginebra Kings	6'2"	(United States) Curtis Stinson	June 12 (vs. Powerade)	July 1 (vs. Talk 'N Text)	2-2
Barangay Ginebra Kings	6'2"	(United States) Donald Sloan	July 16 (vs. Alaska)	August 5 (vs. Rain or Shine)	4-3
B-Meg Llamados	6'2"	(United States) Stefhon Hannah	June 11 (vs. Rain or Shine)	June 26 (vs. Meralco)	2-2
B-Meg Llamados	6'2"	(United States) Darnell Hinson	June 30 (vs. Talk 'N Text)	July 15 (vs. Air21)	2-2
B-Meg Llamados	6'2"	(United States) Myron Allen	July 22 (vs. Rain or Shine)	August 3 (vs. Petron Blaze)	1-4
Meralco Bolts	6'4"	(Nigeria) Chamberlain Oguchi	June 12 (vs. Petron Blaze)	June 26 (vs. B-Meg)	2-2
Meralco Bolts	6'4"	(United States) Tim Pickett	July 7 (vs. Air21)	July 20 (vs. Powerade)	1-3
Petron Blaze Boosters	6'2"	(United States) Mike Taylor	June 12 (vs. Meralco)	June 12 (vs. Meralco)	0-1
Petron Blaze Boosters	6'2"	(United States) Jeremy Wise	June 17 (vs. Air21)	July 15 (vs. Powerade)	4-2
Petron Blaze Boosters	6'2"	(United States) Anthony Grundy	July 24 (vs. Alaska)	August 21 (vs. Talk 'N Text)	6-5
Powerade Tigers	6'6"	(United States) Chris Porter	June 12 (vs. Barangay Ginebra)	July 20 (vs. Meralco)	4-4
Rain or Shine Elasto Painters	6'4"	(United States) Arizona Reid	June 11 (vs. B-Meg)	August 5 (vs. Barangay Ginebra)	6-7
Talk 'N Text Tropang Texters	6'2"	(United States) Maurice Baker	June 15 (vs. Alaska)	July 17 (vs. Air21)	6-2
Talk 'N Text Tropang Texters	6'2"	(United States) Scottie Reynolds	July 22 (vs. Alaska)	August 17 (vs. Petron Blaze)	5-3
Talk 'N Text Tropang Texters	6'2"	(United States) Maurice Baker*	August 19 (vs. Petron Blaze)	August 21 (vs. Petron Blaze)	1-1

=== Import handicapping ===
Team	PHI		COM		Weighted average			Import height limit
Team	W	L	W	L	W	L	PCT	Import height limit
Talk 'N Text Tropang Texters	20	7	15	3	18.0	5.4	.769	6'2"
Petron Blaze Boosters	18	9	2	7	11.6	8.2	.586	6'2"
Barangay Ginebra Kings	14	9	12	10	13.2	9.4	.584	6'2"
B-Meg Llamados	11	11	4	5	8.2	8.6	.488	6'2"
Alaska Aces	8	9	6	6	7.2	7.8	.480	6'4"
Air21 Express	6	9	7	8	6.4	8.6	.427	6'4"
Meralco Bolts	7	9	3	6	5.4	7.8	.409	6'4"
Rain or Shine Elasto Painters	5	10	5	7	5.0	8.8	.362	6'4"
Powerade Tigers	3	11	2	7	2.6	9.4	.217	6'6"
Barako Bull Energy Boosters*	3	11	DNP		1.8	6.6	.214	6'6"

*did not participate in the Governors Cup

== Awards ==
=== Players of the Week ===
Week	Player	Ref.
June 13 – 19	Jayson Castro (Talk 'N Text Tropang Texters); Arwind Santos (Petron Blaze Boosters)	
June 20 – 26	Larry Fonacier (Talk 'N Text Tropang Texters)	
June 28 – July 3	James Yap (B-Meg Llamados)	
July 4 – 10	Mark Caguioa (Barangay Ginebra Kings)	
July 11 – 17	LA Tenorio (Alaska Aces)	
July 18 – 24	Mark Caguioa (Barangay Ginebra Kings)	
July 25 – 31	Ronjay Buenafe (Rain or Shine Elasto Painters)	
August 1 – 7	Arwind Santos (Petron Blaze Boosters)	
