= 2010–11 PBA Philippine Cup =

Philippine basketball tournament

- Duration: October 3, 2010 – February 4, 2011
- TV partner(s): Solar TV, Basketball TV (Local); The Filipino Channel (International)

Finals
- Champions: Talk 'N Text Tropang Texters
- Runners-up: San Miguel Beermen

Awards
- Best Player: Jay Washington (San Miguel Beermen)
- Finals MVP: Jimmy Alapag and Jayson Castro (Talk 'N Text)

PBA Philippine Cup chronology
- < 2009-10 2011-12 >

PBA conference chronology
- < 2010 Fiesta 2011 Commissioner's >

The 2010-11 Philippine Basketball Association (PBA) Philippine Cup was the first conference of the 2010-11 PBA season. The tournament started on October 3, 2010, with the new team, Meralco Bolts defeating the Brgy. Ginebra Kings in the opening game. The tournament is an All-Filipino format, which doesn't require an import or a pure-foreign player for each team.

== Format ==
The following format was observed for the duration of the conference:

- The teams were divided into 2 groups.

Group A:

1. Air21 Express
2. Alaska Aces
3. Barangay Ginebra Kings
4. Meralco Bolts
5. Talk 'N Text Tropang Texters

Group B:

1. Barako Bull Energy Boosters
2. B-Meg Derby Ace Llamados
3. Powerade Tigers
4. Rain or Shine Elasto Painters
5. San Miguel Beermen

- Teams in a group will play against each other once and against teams in the other group twice; 14 games per team; Teams are then seeded by basis on win–loss records. Ties are broken among point differentials of the tied teams. Standings will be determined in one league table; teams do not qualify by basis of groupings. The top eight teams will advance to the quarterfinals.
- Quarterfinal phase:
  - QF1: #1 vs. #8, with #1 having the twice-to-beat advantage
  - QF2: #2 vs. #7, with #2 having the twice-to-beat advantage
  - QF3: #3 vs. #6 in a best-of three series
  - QF4: #4 vs. #5 in a best-of three series
- Best-of-seven semifinals:
  - SF1: QF1 vs. QF4
  - SF2: QF2 vs. QF3
- Best-of-seven finals: winners of the semifinals.

== Elimination round ==
=== Team standings ===
Pos	Team	W	L	PCT	GB	Qualification
1	Talk 'N Text Tropang Texters	11	3	.786 (Note: Head-to-head record: San Miguel 1–1 Talk 'N Text (San Miguel +9))	—	Twice-to-beat in the quarterfinals
2	San Miguel Beermen	11	3	.786	—	Twice-to-beat in the quarterfinals
3	Barangay Ginebra Kings	10	4	.714	1	Best-of-three quarterfinals
4	B-Meg Derby Ace Llamados	7	7	.500 (Note: Head-to-head differential: B-Meg +23, Meralco −11, Alaska −12)	4	Best-of-three quarterfinals
5	Meralco Bolts	7	7	.500	4	Best-of-three quarterfinals
6	Alaska Aces	7	7	.500	4	Best-of-three quarterfinals
7	Air21 Express	6	8	.429	5	Twice-to-win in the quarterfinals
8	Rain or Shine Elasto Painters	5	9	.357	6	Twice-to-win in the quarterfinals
9	Powerade Tigers	3	11	.214 (Note: Head-to-head record: Barako Bull 1–0 Powerade)	8	
10	Barako Bull Energy Boosters	3	11	.214	8	

Source: PBA.ph

=== Schedule ===
Win
Loss
OT win
OT loss

Team	Game number													
Team	1	2	3	4	5	6	7	8	9	10	11	12	13	14
Air21	SMB	ROS	DAL	ALA	BBEB	PWT	BGK	DAL	MER	PWT	SMB	BBEB	ROS	TNT
Alaska	BBEB	DAL	ROS	A21	SMB	TNT	MER	PWT	BGK	BBEB	DAL	ROS	SMB	PWT
B-Meg	TNT	ALA	A21	MER	BGK	SMB	TNT	A21	PWT	ROS	ALA	BGK	MER	BBEB
Barako Bull	ALA	MER	PWT	BGK	A21	ROS	TNT	SMB	BGK	ALA	TNT	MER	A21	DAL
Barangay Ginebra	MER	PWT	SMB	BBEB	DAL	ROS	A21	ALA	BBEB	SMB	DAL	PWT	TNT	ROS
Meralco	BGK	BBEB	TNT	DAL	ROS	PWT	SMB	ALA	A21	PWT	BBEB	SMB	DAL	ROS
Powerade	ROS	BGK	BBEB	SMB	TNT	MER	A21	ALA	DAL	A21	MER	TNT	BGK	ALA
Rain or Shine	PWT	A21	ALA	TNT	MER	BGK	BBEB	SMB	DAL	ALA	TNT	A21	BGK	MER
San Miguel	A21	TNT	BGK	PWT	ALA	DAL	MER	ROS	BBEB	TNT	BGK	A21	MER	ALA
Talk 'N Text	DAL	SMB	MER	ROS	PWT	ALA	DAL	BBEB	SMB	BBEB	PWT	ROS	BGK	A21

== Bracket ==
Quarterfinals
(#1 twice-to-beat)
1	Talk 'N Text	107
8	Rain or Shine	92
(Best-of-3)
4	B-Meg Derby Ace	2
5	Meralco	0
(#2 twice-to-beat)
2	San Miguel	95
7	Air21	75
(Best-of-3)
3	Barangay Ginebra	2
6	Alaska	1

Semifinals (Best-of-7)
1	Talk 'N Text	4
4	B-Meg Derby Ace	2
2	San Miguel	4
3	Barangay Ginebra	2

Finals (Best-of-7)
1	Talk 'N Text	4
2	San Miguel	2

== Quarterfinals ==
=== (1) Talk 'N Text vs. (8) Rain or Shine ===
December 19

Talk 'N Text Tropang Texters 107, Rain or Shine Elasto Painters 92
Talk 'N Text wins series in one game

Araneta Coliseum, Quezon City

=== (2) San Miguel vs. (7) Air21 ===
December 19

San Miguel Beermen 95, Air21 Express 75
San Miguel wins series in one game

Araneta Coliseum, Quezon City

=== (4) B-Meg Derby Ace vs. (5) Meralco ===
December 17

B-Meg Derby Ace Llamados 106, Meralco Bolts 97 (2OT)

Araneta Coliseum, Quezon City

December 22

B-Meg Derby Ace Llamados 92, Meralco Bolts 88
B-Meg Derby Ace wins series, 2–0

Araneta Coliseum, Quezon City

=== (3) Barangay Ginebra vs. (6) Alaska ===
December 17

Barangay Ginebra Kings 101, Alaska Aces 104

Araneta Coliseum, Quezon City

December 22

Barangay Ginebra Kings 92, Alaska Aces 76

Araneta Coliseum, Quezon City

December 25

Barangay Ginebra Kings 79, Alaska Aces 70
Barangay Ginebra wins series, 2–1

Cuneta Astrodome, Pasay

== Semifinals ==
=== (1) Talk 'N Text vs. (4) B-Meg Derby Ace ===
December 26

Talk 'N Text Tropang Texters 98, B-Meg Derby Ace Llamados 91

Ynares Sports Center, Antipolo

January 5

Talk 'N Text Tropang Texters 87, B-Meg Derby Ace Llamados 88

Araneta Coliseum, Quezon City

January 7

Talk 'N Text Tropang Texters 92, B-Meg Derby Ace Llamados 78

Araneta Coliseum, Quezon City

January 9

Talk 'N Text Tropang Texters 93, B-Meg Derby Ace Llamados 98

Araneta Coliseum, Quezon City

January 12

Talk 'N Text Tropang Texters 97, B-Meg Derby Ace Llamados 83

Araneta Coliseum, Quezon City

January 14

Talk 'N Text Tropang Texters 89, B-Meg Derby Ace Llamados 72
Talk 'N Text wins series, 4–2

Araneta Coliseum, Quezon City

=== (2) San Miguel vs. (3) Barangay Ginebra ===
January 5

San Miguel Beermen 86, Barangay Ginebra Kings 84

Araneta Coliseum, Quezon City

January 7

San Miguel Beermen 108, Barangay Ginebra Kings 102

Araneta Coliseum, Quezon City

January 9

San Miguel Beermen 78, Barangay Ginebra Kings 95

Araneta Coliseum, Quezon City

January 12

San Miguel Beermen 108, Barangay Ginebra Kings 104 (2OT)

Araneta Coliseum, Quezon City

January 14

San Miguel Beermen 76, Barangay Ginebra Kings 102

Araneta Coliseum, Quezon City

January 16

San Miguel Beermen 89, Barangay Ginebra Kings 86
San Miguel wins series 4–2

Araneta Coliseum, Quezon City

== Finals ==
January 22

Talk 'N Text Tropang Texters 91, San Miguel Beermen 82

Victorias City Sports and Amusement Center, Victorias, Negros Occidental

January 26

Talk 'N Text Tropang Texters 110, San Miguel Beermen 102

Cuneta Astrodome, Pasay

January 28

Talk 'N Text Tropang Texters 82, San Miguel Beermen 103

Araneta Coliseum, Quezon City

January 30

Talk 'N Text Tropang Texters 87, San Miguel Beermen 91

Araneta Coliseum, Quezon City

February 2

Talk 'N Text Tropang Texters 99, San Miguel Beermen 77

Araneta Coliseum, Quezon City

February 4

Talk 'N Text Tropang Texters 95, San Miguel Beermen 82
Talk 'N Text wins series, 4–2

Araneta Coliseum, Quezon City

== Conference records ==
Records marked with an asterisk (*) were accomplished with one or more overtime periods.

=== Team ===
Record	Stat	Holder	Date/s
Longest winning streak	7	Talk 'N Text Tropang Texters	November 26, 2010 - December 26, 2010
Longest losing streak	8	Barako Bull Energy Boosters	October 31, 2010 – December 5, 2010
Longest losing streak	8	Powerade Tigers	November 3, 2010 - December 15, 2010
Most points in one game (winning team)	125*	Meralco Bolts (vs Rain or Shine Elasto Painters)	December 15, 2010
Most points in one game (losing team)	124*	Rain or Shine Elasto Painters (vs Meralco Bolts)	December 15, 2010
Most points in one game (combined)	249*	Meralco Bolts vs Rain or Shine Elasto Painters	December 15, 2010
Most points in one half	68	San Miguel Beermen (vs Powerade Tigers)	October 23, 2010
Most points in one quarter	39	Barangay Ginebra Kings (vs Talk 'N Text Tropang Texters)	December 10, 2010
Least points in one game (winning team)	69	San Miguel Beermen (vs Barangay Ginebra Kings)	
Least points in one game (losing team)	64	Barako Bull Energy Boosters (vs Alaska Aces)	
Least points in one game (combined)	137	San Miguel Beermen vs Barangay Ginebra Kings	December 1, 2010
Least points in one quarter	7	Alaska Aces (vs Barangay Ginebra Kings)	December 25, 2010
Least points in one half	25	Alaska Aces (vs San Miguel Beermen)	
Biggest winning margin	29	Alaska Aces (vs Powerade Tigers)	November 10, 2010

=== Individual ===
Record	Stat	Holder	Date/s
Most points in one game	42	Peter June Simon (Derby Ace Llamados vs Air 21 Express)	November 10, 2010
Most rebounds in one game	22	Rudy Hatfield (Brgy. Ginebra Kings vs Barako Bull Energy Boosters)	October 22, 2010
Most defensive rebounds in one game	17	Rudy Hatfield (Brgy. Ginebra Kings vs Barako Bull Energy Boosters)	October 22, 2010
Most offensive rebounds in one game	10	Harvey Carey (Talk 'N Text Tropang Texters vs Air21 Express)	December 12, 2010
Most assists in one game	11*	Chris Ross (Meralco Bolts vs Rain or Shine Elasto Painters)	December 15, 2010
Most blocks in one game	6	Mark Andaya (Barako Bull Energy Boosters vs Alaska Aces)	October 8, 2010
Most blocks in one game	6	Nonoy Baclao (Air21 Express vs Alaska Aces)	October 22, 2010
Most steals in one game	7	Solomon Mercado (Rain or Shine Elasto Painters vs Meralco Bolts)	October 24, 2010
Most steals in one game	7*	Chris Ross (Meralco Bolts vs Rain or Shine Elasto Painters)	December 15, 2010
Most FG made in one game	14	Gary David (Powerade Tigers vs Air21 Express)	November 18, 2010
Most FG made in one game	14*	Peter June Simon (Derby Ace Llamados vs Meralco Bolts)	December 17, 2010
Most 3 point FG made in one game	7	Ronjay Buenafe (Air21 Express vs Alaska Aces)	October 10, 2010
Most FT made in one game	15*	Mark Cardona (Meralco Bolts vs Rain or Shine Elasto Painters)	December 15, 2010
Most minutes played in one game	56*	Chris Ross (Meralco Bolts vs Rain or Shine Elasto Painters)	December 15, 2010

== Awards ==
=== Conference ===
- Best Player of the Conference: Jay Washington (San Miguel)
- Finals MVP: Jimmy Alapag and Jayson Castro (Talk 'N Text)

=== Players of the Week ===
Week	Player	Ref.
October 3 – 9	Harvey Carey (Talk 'N Text Tropang Texters)	
October 10 – 16	Joe Devance (Alaska Aces)	
October 17 – 23	Ronjay Buenafe (Air21 Express)	
October 25 – 31	Alex Cabagnot (San Miguel Beermen)	
November 1–7	Solomon Mercado (Rain or Shine Elasto Painters)	
November 8–14	Peter June Simon (B-Meg Derby Ace Llamados)	
November 15–21	Jay Washington (San Miguel Beermen)	
November 22–28	Jimmy Alapag (Talk 'N Text Tropang Texters)	
November 29 – December 5	Rabeh Al-Hussaini (Air21 Express)	
December 6–12	Ali Peek (Talk 'N Text Tropang Texters)	
December 13–19	Joe Devance (Alaska Aces)	
December 20–26	Mark Caguioa (Barangay Ginebra Kings)	

== Statistical leaders ==
=== Entire conference ===
Category	Player	Team	Games played	Totals	Average
Points per game	Gary David	Powerade Tigers	14	301	21.50
Rebounds per game	Rudy Hatfield	Barangay Ginebra Kings	20	242	12.10
Assists per game	Chris Ross	Meralco Bolts	16	100	6.25
Steals per game	Chris Ross	Meralco Bolts	16	38	2.38
Blocks per game	Nonoy Baclao	Air21 Express	15	35	2.50
Field goal percentage	Ali Peek	Talk 'N Text Tropang Texters	19	105-161	0.652
3-pt field goal percentage	Dondon Hontiveros	San Miguel Beermen	17	33-72	0.458
Free throw percentage	Tony dela Cruz	Alaska Aces	14	22-25	0.880
Minutes per game	Joe Devance	Alaska Aces	17	641	37.71

=== Eliminations ===
Category	Player	Team	Games played	Totals	Average
Points per game	Gary David	Powerade Tigers	14	301	21.50
Rebounds per game	Harvey Carey	Talk 'N Text Tropang Texters	14	180	12.86
Assists per game	Chris Ross	Meralco Bolts	14	87	6.21
Steals per game	Chris Ross	Meralco Bolts	14	31	2.21
Blocks per game	Nonoy Baclao	Air21 Express	14	33	2.54
Field goal percentage	Ali Peek	Talk 'N Text Tropang Texters	14	76-119	0.639
3-pt field goal percentage	Joe Devance	Alaska Aces	14	27-57	0.474
Free throw percentage	Jimmy Alapag	Talk 'N Text Tropang Texters	14	63-72	0.875
Minutes per game	Joe Devance	Alaska Aces	14	520	37.14

=== Quarterfinals ===
Category	Player	Team	Games played	Totals	Average
Points per game	Peter June Simon	B-Meg Derby Ace Llamados	2	58	29.00
Rebounds per game	Rudy Hatfield	Brgy. Ginebra Kings	3	45	15.00
Assists per game	Jimmy Alapag	Talk 'N Text Tropang Texters	1	11	11.00
Steals per game	Paul Artadi	San Miguel Beermen	1	4	4.00
Blocks per game	Jared Dillinger	Talk 'N Text Tropang Texters	1	3	3.00
Field goal percentage	Ali Peek	Talk 'N Text Tropang Texters	1	9-11	0.818
3-pt field goal percentage	Peter June Simon	B-Meg Derby Ace Llamados	2	3-5	0.600
Free throw percentage	Ronjay Buenafe	Air21 Express	1	9-9	1.000
Minutes per game	Peter June Simon	B-Meg Derby Ace Llamados	2	91	45.50

=== Semifinals ===
Category	Player	Team	Games played	Totals	Average
Points per game	James Yap	B-Meg Derby Ace Llamados	4	84	21.00
Rebounds per game	Dorian Pena	San Miguel Beermen	3	36	12.00
Assists per game	Roger Yap	B-Meg Derby Ace Llamados	3	16	5.33
Steals per game	Roger Yap	B-Meg Derby Ace Llamados	3	7	2.33
Blocks per game	Marc Pingris	B-Meg Derby Ace Llamados	4	4	1.00
Blocks per game	Danny Seigle	San Miguel Beermen	3	3	1.00
Blocks per game	Jay Washington	San Miguel Beermen	3	3	1.00
Field goal percentage	Olsen Racela	San Miguel Beermen	3	2-3	0.667
3-pt field goal percentage	Olsen Racela	San Miguel Beermen	3	2-3	0.667
Free throw percentage	Nino Canaleta	B-Meg Derby Ace Llamados	4	4-4	1.000
Minutes per game	Willie Miller	Barangay Ginebra Kings	3	110	36.67
Minutes per game	Jay Washington	San Miguel Beermen	3	110	36.67

=== Finals ===
Category	Player	Team	Games played	Totals	Average
