= Jun Bernardino Trophy =

PBA Philippine Cup trophy

- The 2013 version of the Jun Bernardino Trophy
- Awarded for: winner of the PBA Philippine Cup
- Presented by: PBA
- First award: 2007
- Currently held by: Talk 'N Text Tropang Texters (2006 version); San Miguel Beermen (2013 version); San Miguel Beermen (2017 version)
- Website: PBA.ph

The Jun Bernardino Trophy is a trophy awarded to the Philippine Basketball Association (PBA) team that wins the PBA Philippine Cup finals. Originally known as the Perpetual Trophy, the trophy was created in 2006 to be awarded in the 2006–07 Philippine Cup finals. It was renamed to its current moniker in March 2007 following the death of former commissioner Jun Bernardino.

Unlike the other championship trophies given out by the league, this trophy is passed on to the champions of the most recent Philippine Cup finals series. Should a team win three consecutive Philippine Cup finals, that team will earn permanent possession of the trophy and a new version is created for future champions. Currently, there are three versions of this trophy: the first version, created in 2006, is being kept permanently by the Talk 'N Text Tropang Texters (now TNT Tropang 5G after winning three straight Philippine Cups (2010–11, 2011–12, 2012–13). The second version, commissioned in 2013, is permanently kept by the San Miguel Beermen after winning three straight Philippine Cup championships from 2014–15 to 2016–17. The third version, which was made before the start of the 2017–18 season is currently in the possession of the San Miguel Beermen after winning their eleventh Philippine Cup championship in 2025, which they later defended in 2025–26.

== History ==
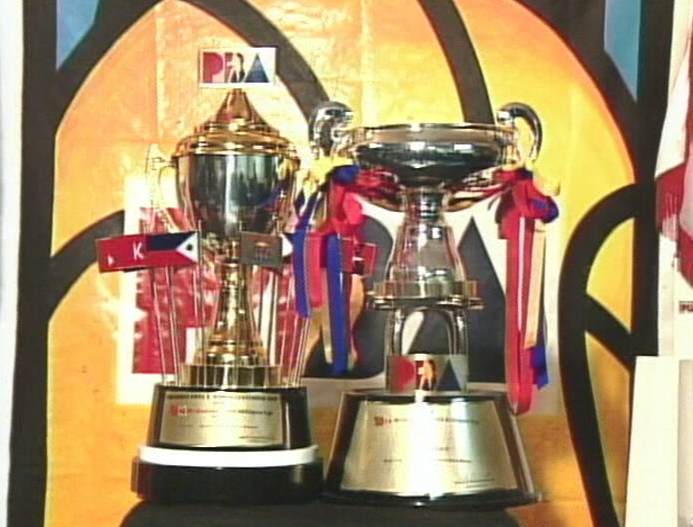
The previous design of the All-Filipino Cup (right) used from 1994 to 2002 together with the FVR Centennial Trophy. Both trophies were awarded to the winner of the 1998 All-Filipino Cup finals.

From its inception in 1975, the All-Filipino Conference (also known as the All-Filipino Cup from 1993 to 2003) has been considered the most prestigious tournament in a PBA season. The winners of the tournament were previously presented with trophies with varying designs depending on what season it was won. In 1994, the league standardized the design of all of its championship trophies, including the All-Filipino Cup. The trophy design features the Cup supported in a base where the PBA logo, the name and year of the tournament, and the name of the winning team are engraved. The trophies were designed by Angel Zamora and Sons. This trophy design was used until 2002 (a modified version of this trophy was used as the design of the runner-up trophy in 2013). A replica of the 1994 All-Filipino Cup trophy, together with the prototype Commissioner's Cup and the Governors' Cup trophies are on display at the PBA head office in Libis, Quezon City.

In 1998, an additional trophy, named as the FVR Centennial Cup trophy was awarded to the champions of the year's All Filipino Cup to commemorate the Philippine's celebration of its Centennial Independence. It was named after President Fidel V. Ramos (FVR). The design consists of a cup surrounded by the flags used during the 1898 Philippine Revolution.

Starting in 2003, the trophy design for the tournament varied. In 2004, the All-Filipino Cup was renamed as the Philippine Cup after the league revamped its tournament calendar starting the 2004-05 season.

In 2006, the league commissioned Filipino artist Ramon Orlina to design a trophy that will be named as the "Perpetual Trophy". The winners of the Philippine Cup will maintain possession of the trophy for a year, afterwards a smaller replica will be given. However, the team that will successfully defend the title for three consecutive times will permanently keep the trophy.

Before the 2012-13 season, no team has ever won the championship three times in a row in a yearly succession. The Crispa Redmanizers have won the All-Filipino Conference for four straight tournaments (1979, 1980, 1983, and 1984 First AFC), but not in consecutive years, since there were no All-Filipino tournament held for the 1981 and 1982 seasons.

In March 2007, former league commissioner Jun Bernardino died from a heart attack. As a tribute, the league renamed the Perpetual Trophy as the Jun Bernardino Trophy.

== Description ==
The 2006 version of the Jun Bernardino Trophy. It is now in the possession of the TNT Tropang Texters after winning three consecutive Philippine Cups from 2011 to 2013.

The trophy is made up of 24-karat gold plate, stands at 1 metre (3.3 ft) tall and worth ₱500,000 (as of 2006). The frame, in the shape of a basketball ring, is composed of eight panels with four designs, reflecting at opposite sides. The design consists of a basketball player dribbling, shooting, or dunking the ball. The ring supports an orb, reflecting a basketball's groove lines. A gold-plated sphere is placed at the center to illuminate the optical illusion of a basketball together with the orb.

Engraved on the base of the first version of the trophy are the wordmarks of the 10 teams extant during the trophy's creation in 2006. The teams were Air21, Alaska, Barangay Ginebra, Coca-Cola, Purefoods, Red Bull, San Miguel, Sta. Lucia, Talk 'N Text, and Welcoat.

For the second version, the base was engraved with the logos of the 10 teams that competed during the 2013–14 season. The teams were Air21, Alaska, Barako Bull, Barangay Ginebra, GlobalPort, Meralco, Petron Blaze, Rain or Shine, San Mig Super Coffee and Talk 'N Text.

The third version of the trophy features the logos of the 12 teams that competed as of the 2017–18 season. The teams were Alaska, Barangay Ginebra, Blackwater, GlobalPort, Kia, Magnolia, Meralco, NLEX, Phoenix, Rain or Shine, San Miguel and TNT.

== Winners ==
The first recipients of the Perpetual trophy were the Barangay Ginebra Kings, who won their best-of-seven championship series against the San Miguel Beermen in six games.

After it was won by Barangay Ginebra in 2006–2007, they were unable to defend the title the next season after failing to advance through the wildcard phase of the tournament. The champions became the Sta. Lucia Realtors, in which they won their second championship in franchise history and their first All-Filipino championship against Purefoods.

Sta. Lucia failed to advance to the final round of the 2008–09 tournament, being eliminated by Alaska in their best of seven semifinal series. The trophy was eventually won by Talk 'N Text, beating Alaska in seven games.

Talk 'N Text was set to defend the title in the 2009–10 Philippine Cup but their quarterfinal series against Barangay Ginebra marred with controversy when Talk 'N Text walked-out of the playing court after protesting a "flagrant foul" call against one of their players in Game 4. Then PBA commissioner Sonny Barrios awarded the win to Barangay Ginebra, who led by seven points before the walkout occurred. Talk 'N Text were eliminated in the series-clinching Game 5. Barangay Ginebra advances to the semifinals before being swept by Alaska in four games. Purefoods then swept Alaska in their championship series.

Talk 'N Text regained possession of the trophy after winning their finals series against San Miguel in the 2010–11 Philippine Cup after six games.

The following year, Talk 'N Text retained the championship after beating the Powerade Tigers in five games. Talk 'N Text became the first team in 27 years to successfully defend the All-Filipino Cup after it was done by Great Taste in 1985.

The Tropang Texters successfully defended the championship in the 2012–13 edition of the tournament after sweeping their finals series against Rain or Shine Elasto Painters. The team now keeps permanent possession of the trophy after winning the Philippine Cup for three consecutive seasons.

A second version of the trophy was created in 2013 and it was first won by the San Mig Super Coffee Mixers in six games. The Coffee Mixers, renamed as the Purefoods Star Hotshots beginning the 2014–15 season, however failed to defend the crown, as they got eliminated in the first round of the quarterfinals of the Philippine Cup against the Meralco Bolts, who had a twice-to-beat advantage. The San Miguel Beermen, who topped the elimination round standings, won the Philippine Cup against the Alaska Aces in seven games. The two teams will meet again in the finals of the 2015–16 Philippine Cup. Alaska won the first three games to go up 3–0. Since then, the San Miguel Beermen won Games 4, 5, and 6 to force a Game 7 and became the first team in PBA history to force a seventh game, after being down 0–3. San Miguel won against Alaska in seven games to capture their 22nd PBA championship and their 6th Philippine Cup. Dubbed as "BEERacle", San Miguel became the first team in professional basketball history to win a series coming from a 0–3 deficit.

== List of trophy holders ==
| Season | Winning team | Series | Details |
|---|---|---|---|
| 2006–07 | Barangay Ginebra | 4–2 | Philippine Cup |
| 2007–08 | Sta. Lucia | 4–3 | Philippine Cup |
| 2008–09 | Talk 'N Text | 4–3 | Philippine Cup |
| 2009–10 | Purefoods | 4–0 | Philippine Cup |
| 2010–11 | Talk 'N Text | 4–2 | Philippine Cup |
| 2011–12 | Talk 'N Text | 4–1 | Philippine Cup |
| 2012–13 | Talk 'N Text | 4–0 | Philippine Cup |
| 2013–14 | San Mig Super Coffee | 4–2 | Philippine Cup |
| 2014–15 | San Miguel | 4–3 | Philippine Cup |
| 2015–16 | San Miguel | 4–3 | Philippine Cup |
| 2016–17 | San Miguel | 4–1 | Philippine Cup |
| 2017–18 | San Miguel | 4–1 | Philippine Cup |
| 2019 | San Miguel | 4–3 | Philippine Cup |
| 2020 | Barangay Ginebra | 4–1 | Philippine Cup |
| 2021 | TNT | 4–1 | Philippine Cup |
| 2022–23 | San Miguel | 4–3 | Philippine Cup |
| 2023–24 | Meralco | 4–2 | Philippine Cup |
| 2024–25 | San Miguel | 4–2 | Philippine Cup |
| 2025–26 | San Miguel | 4–2 | Philippine Cup |
