= 2007–08 PBA Philippine Cup finals =

Basketball cup finals

Team	Coach	Wins
Sta. Lucia Realtors	Boyet Fernandez	4
Purefoods TJ Giants	Ryan Gregorio	3
- Dates: February 15 – March 2, 2008
- MVP: Dennis Espino
- Television: ABC
- Radio network: Radyo PBA

Referees
- Game 1: Calungcaguin, Herrera, Maurillo
- Game 2: Cruz, Aldaba, Canizares
- Game 3: Calungcaguin, Herrera, G. Ferrer
- Game 4: Aldaba, Ferrer, Maurillo
- Game 5: Aldaba, Montiel, Quilinguen
- Game 6: Cruz, Montiel, Aldaba
- Game 7: Cruz, Calungcaguin, Herrera

PBA Philippine Cup finals chronology
- < 2006–07 2008–09 >

PBA finals chronology
- < 2007 Fiesta 2008 Fiesta >

The 2007–08 Philippine Basketball Association (PBA) Philippine Cup finals is the best-of-7 championship series of the 2007–08 PBA Philippine Cup, and the conclusion of the conference's playoffs. The series is a best of seven affair and is the 94th championship disputed in the league. The teams competing are the second-seed Sta. Lucia Realtors and the first-seed Purefoods Tender Juicy Giants. The Realtors are in their first Philippine Cup finals stint.

== Qualification ==
Purefoods		Sta. Lucia
Finished 12–6 (0.667)	Elimination round	Finished 12–6 (0.667) – 2nd
2–0 against Sta. Lucia – 1st	Tiebreaker	Finished 12–6 (0.667) – 2nd
Bye	Wildcard phase	Bye
Bye	Quarterfinals	Bye
Def. Red Bull Barako – 4–3	Semifinals	Def. Alaska Aces – 4–3

== Rosters ==
Sta. Lucia Realtors roster
Players

Pos.	#	POB	Name	Height	Weight	DOB (YYYY–MM–DD)	From
F	3	(Philippines)	Nelbert Omolon	6 ft 4 in (1.93 m)			Philippine Christian
G	8	(Philippines)	Paolo Mendoza	5 ft 11 in (1.80 m)			Philippines
C	9	(Philippines)	Philip Butel	6 ft 7 in (2.01 m)			UE
G	10	(United States)	Ryan Reyes	6 ft 2 in (1.88 m)			Cal State Fullerton
C	13	(Philippines)	Marlou Aquino	6 ft 9 in (2.06 m)			Adamson
F	14	(Philippines)	Dennis Daa	6 ft 5 in (1.96 m)			Centro Escolar Las Piñas
F/C	16	(Philippines)	Dennis Espino (C)	6 ft 6 in (1.98 m)			UST
G	18	(Philippines)	Joseph Yeo	5 ft 11 in (1.80 m)			De La Salle
F	19	(Philippines)	Melvin Mamaclay	6 ft 5 in (1.96 m)			Adamson
F	21	(United States)	Kelly Williams	6 ft 7 in (2.01 m)			Oakland
G	25	(Philippines)	Ronnie Bughao	5 ft 11 in (1.80 m)			San Beda
F	28	(Philippines)	Norman Gonzales	6 ft 4 in (1.93 m)			San Beda
G	32	(Philippines)	Dennis Miranda	6 ft 0 in (1.83 m)			Far Eastern
G	40	(Philippines)	Christian Coronel	5 ft 11 in (1.80 m)			San Sebastian

Coaches
Head coach
- (Philippines) Boyet Fernandez
Assistant(s)
- (Philippines) Adonis Tierra
- (Philippines) Cholo Martin
- (Philippines) Jaime Serrano, Jr

Legend
- (DP) Unsigned draft pick
- (FA) Free agent
- (S) Suspended
- Injured

Purefoods Tender Juicy Giants roster
Players

Pos.	#	POB	Name	Height	Weight	DOB (YYYY–MM–DD)	From
G	1	(Philippines)	Chico Lanete	6 ft 0 in (1.83 m)			Lyceum
C	5	(Philippines)	Jondan Salvador	6 ft 5 in (1.96 m)			St. Benilde
F/C	6	(Philippines)	Omanzie Rodriguez	6 ft 6 in (1.98 m)			Mapúa
F	7	(Philippines)	Rey Evangelista	6 ft 3 in (1.91 m)			UST
G	8	(Philippines)	Peter June Simon	6 ft 1 in (1.85 m)			Mindanao
F	9	(Philippines)	Robert Sanz	6 ft 3 in (1.91 m)			Philippine Christian
C	10	(Philippines)	Rommel Adducul	6 ft 6 in (1.98 m)			San Sebastian
G	13	(Philippines)	Roger Yap	6 ft 0 in (1.83 m)			USJ–R
F	15	(Philippines)	Marc Pingris	6 ft 4 in (1.93 m)			PSBA
G	18	(Philippines)	James Yap	6 ft 3 in (1.91 m)			UE
F	20	(Philippines)	Ardy Larong	6 ft 2 in (1.88 m)			USJ–R
F	21	(Philippines)	Kerby Raymundo (C)	6 ft 6 in (1.98 m)			Letran
G	24	(United States)	Brandon Cablay (injured)	6 ft 0 in (1.83 m)			Vanguard
F	28	(Philippines)	Richard Yee	6 ft 4 in (1.93 m)			UST
G	40	(United States)	Noy Castillo	6 ft 0 in (1.83 m)			The Citadel

Coaches
Head coach
- (Philippines) Ryan Gregorio
Assistant(s)
- (Philippines) Koy Banal
- (Philippines) Ronnie Magsanoc
- (Philippines) Dayong Mendoza

Legend
- (DP) Unsigned draft pick
- (FA) Free agent
- (S) Suspended
- Injured

== Series scoring summary ==
Team	Game 1	Game 2	Game 3	Game 4	Game 5	Game 6	Game 7	Wins
Sta. Lucia	109	112	107	98	88	81	100	4
Purefoods	97	101	118	106	76	89	88	3
Venue	Araneta	Araneta	Araneta	Araneta	Araneta	Araneta	Araneta

== Games summary ==
=== Game 1 ===
ABC

February 15
7:20 p.m.

boxscore

Sta. Lucia Realtors 109, Purefoods Tender Juicy Giants 97
Scoring by quarter: 19–26, 27–29, 33–19, 30–23
Pts: Williams 24; Rebs: Williams 12; Asts: Reyes 5	Pts: J. Yap 22; Rebs: Pingris 11; Asts: R. Yap 4
Sta. Lucia leads series, 1–0

Araneta Coliseum, Quezon City
Referees: Calungcaguin, Herrera, Maurillo

Purefoods and SLR engaged in a battle of attrition in the first three quarters but the Realtors pulled away late in the third quarter. Thanks to defense that led into transition offense, Kelly Williams collected 14 of his game-high 24 points to outscore the Giants 30–23 in the fourth quarter to claim Game 1.

=== Game 2 ===
ABC

February 17
6:30 p.m.

boxscore

Sta. Lucia Realtors 112, Purefoods Tender Juicy Giants 101
Scoring by quarter: 28–26, 25–27, 28–28, 31–20
Pts: Williams 23; Rebs: Williams 11; Asts: Miranda 6	Pts: J. Yap 28; Rebs: Pingris 11; Asts: Raymundo 8
Sta. Lucia leads series, 2–0

Araneta Coliseum, Quezon City
Referees: Cruz, Aldaba, Canizares

Just like in Game 1, Purefoods and SLR fought a close game until the fourth quarter when Sta. Lucia's younger players led a 12–2 run to close out the game; Joseph Yeo scored 16 while Miranda added 14 plus 6 assists.

=== Game 3 ===
ABC

February 20
7:00 p.m.

boxscore

Sta. Lucia Realtors 107, Purefoods Tender Juicy Giants 118
Scoring by quarter: 26–28, 30–31, 24–27, 27–32
Pts: Yeo 22; Rebs: Williams 14; Asts: Yeo 3	Pts: J. Yap 27; Rebs: Adducul 10; Asts: Raymundo 6
Sta. Lucia leads series, 2–1

Araneta Coliseum, Quezon City
Referees: Calungcaguin, Herrera, G. Ferrer

Purefoods found their finishing kick in the fourth quarter to prevent a sweep of the championship series to clinch their first win. With Peter June Simon being the third scoring option, Simon led the Giants through the third quarter with his outside sniping. James Yap and Kerby Raymundo finished off Simon's work in the fourth quarter. Williams got cold in the payoff quarter that prevented SLR's comeback.

=== Game 4 ===
ABC

February 22
7:00 p.m.

boxscore

Sta. Lucia Realtors 98, Purefoods Tender Juicy Giants 106
Scoring by quarter: 28–27, 23–34, 37–22, 10–23
Pts: Omolon 19; Rebs: Williams 12; Asts: Miranda 9	Pts: J. Yap 32; Rebs: Adducul 13; Asts: Raymundo 5
Series tied, 2–2

Araneta Coliseum, Quezon City
Referees: Aldaba, Ferrer, Maurillo

Prior to the game, Kelly Williams was awarded with the Best Player of the Conference Award, beating out Kerby Raymundo of Purefoods, Willie Miller of Alaska, Asi Taulava of Coca-Cola and Arwind Santos of Air21. Williams is the first Realtor to win the award

However, the award has a jinx in which the awardee will lose the game in which he was awarded. Sta. Lucia tried to prevent that as they led by a point after the first quarter in which Raymundo and Pingris were assessed with two technical fouls each due to excessive complaining. Purefoods led by 10 thanks to a buzzer-beater by Roger Yap when the shot clock expired prior to half-time. Sta. Lucia closed the gap in the third quarter thanks to Nelbert Omolon's and Dennis Miranda's three-point shooting.

With the two teams exchanging turnovers at the fourth quarter, the Giants seized the initiative when James Yap scored 4 points in the last 2:03 to break the last deadlock at 95-all; Yap scored a conference-high 32 points. Purefoods managed to hold on to tie the series 2–2.

=== Game 5 ===
ABC

February 24
6:30 p.m.

boxscore

Sta. Lucia Realtors 88, Purefoods Tender Juicy Giants 76
Scoring by quarter: 15–19, 22–20, 25–11, 26–26
Pts: Williams 20; Rebs: Williams 16; Asts: Aquino, Miranda 4	Pts: Raymundo 20; Rebs: Pingris 9 Asts: Raymundo 7
Sta. Lucia leads series, 3–2

Araneta Coliseum, Quezon City
Referees: Aldaba, Montiel, Quilinguen

With both Yeo and Yap suspended, the two teams had less options for offense which led to the lowest scoring first quarter of the series. Purefoods opened the game on a better note, however, when they led by as much as 11 points in the first half.

The Realtors crept back into the game thanks to points off Purefoods' turnovers. Simon got cold and Raymundo had a tough time against SLR's zone defense. With Sta. Lucia erecting a double-digit lead, Purefoods managed to cut to seven but Chico Lanete's turnover in a fastbreak attempt ended the Giants' hopes of a comeback.

SLR had good games from veterans Dennis Espino and Paolo Mendoza who stepped up in Yeo's absence.

=== Game 6 ===
ABC

February 27
7:00 p.m.

boxscore

Sta. Lucia Realtors 81, Purefoods Tender Juicy Giants 89
Scoring by quarter: 15–22, 15–18, 29–17, 22–32
Pts: Espino 22; Rebs: Williams 17; Asts: Miranda 5	Pts: J. Yap 30; Rebs: Pingris 21; Asts: Raymundo 11
Series tied, 3–3

Araneta Coliseum, Quezon City
Referees: Cruz, Montiel, Aldaba

Both Yeo and Yap returned from the suspensions in the pivotal Game 6; the TJ Giants are on a do-or-die situation while the Realtors can clinch the title with a win.

The teams took the opening quarter strong but Purefoods pulled away after a tight first few minutes. SLR caught up with them at the second quarter but thanks to Purefoods' rebounding, they inflated their lead by up to ten points at half-time.

The Realtors stepped their offense on the third quarter, even leading at some points. But James Yap scored 20 of his 30 teams in the payoff period to lead Purefoods into a Game 7. Williams had a lackluster offensive game although he grabbed 17 rebounds; but it was Marc Pingris who grabbed the most boards, with a series high 21 rebounds.

=== Game 7 ===
ABC

March 2
6:30 p.m.

boxscore

Sta. Lucia Realtors 100, Purefoods Tender Juicy Giants 88
Scoring by quarter: 18–21, 26–24, 27–25, 29–18
Pts: Espino 29; Rebs: Williams 15; Asts: Yeo 5	Pts: Simon 27; Rebs: Pingris 13; Asts: R. Yap 4
Sta. Lucia wins series, 4–3

Araneta Coliseum, Quezon City
Attendance: 18,167
Referees: Cruz, Calungcaguin, Herrera

With the Araneta Coliseum unavailable for February 29 due to a Ne-Yo concert, the final game was conducted on March 2. YouTube singing sensation Charice Pempengco sang the national anthem prior the game.

Sta. Lucia started with a 6–1 blast but Purefoods caught up with them and took the lead at the end of the first quarter. Sta. Lucia and the TJ Giants kept it close as neither team led by more than double figures by half-time. When the third quarter started, Sta. Lucia ignited a run that saw their lead reach 10 points; Simon then led the comeback for Purefoods as the Giants caught up once again to arrange a close fourth quarter.

The game was close until the seven-minute mark when Ryan Reyes scored a three-point field goal; James Yap, not to be outdone, shot a trey but it rattled out of rim. The #1 draft pick on the 1995 PBA Draft Dennis Espino then led the 13–2 run as Purefoods' outside shots rattled in-and-out of the rim for a Sta. Lucia pull-away. Giants coach Ryan Gregorio used up all of his timeouts but the Realtors managed to convert their inside jumpers. Espino scored 10 points in the fourth quarter to prevent a Purefoods incursion to assure the Sta. Lucia franchise their first Philippine Cup championship and their second championship overall. Espino was adjudged as the finals MVP.

2007–08 Philippine Cup Champions

Sta. Lucia Realtors
Second title

== Finals Most Valuable Player ==
- Dennis Espino (Sta. Lucia Realtors)

== Statistics ==
Scoring by quarter
Team	1st	2nd	3rd	4th	Total
Purefoods	169	183	149	174	675
Sta. Lucia	149	168	203	175	695

=== Purefoods ===
Name	GP	2FG%	3FG%	FG%	FT%	Reb	Ast	TO	Stl	Blk	Fls	Pts
Rommel Adducul	7	57.1	--	57.1	55.6	8.4	0.3	1.5	0.14	0.57	3.6	5.6
Noy Castillo	6	50.0	35.7	38.9	50.0	1.6	0.8	0.6	0.00	0.00	2.4	4.4
Rey Evangelista	3	77.8	100.0	80.0	0.00	3.7	0.0	0.3	0.33	0.00	2.0	5.7
Chico Lanete	6	29.4	36.4	32.1	75.0	1.7	0.6	1.6	0.57	0.00	1.4	3.6
Ardy Larong	4	0.0	50.0	33.3	50.0	0.0	0.0	0.3	0.00	0.25	2.5	1.0
Marc Pingris	7	54.5	--	54.5	73.9	11.6	0.9	1.7	0.29	1.43	4.3	9.3
Kerby Raymundo	7	44.1	14.3	38.6	86.7	8.0	6.0	3.6	0.71	1.00	3.6	18.6
Omanzie Rodriguez	2	60.0	--	60.0	100.0	0.8	0.2	0.2	0.20	0.00	0.4	2.0
Jondan Salvador	7	53.3	--	53.3	50.0	4.4	0.2	1.2	0.40	0.00	3.6	3.4
Robert Sanz	4	66.7	25.0	52.2	81.8	0.3	0.0	0.8	0.17	0.00	2.0	1.6
Peter June Simon	7	48.1	33.3	41.4	74.4	2.4	0.6	1.3	0.14	0.00	2.6	18.4
James Yap	6	43.9	32.3	40.2	70.6	4.3	2.2	2.7	0.17	0.83	2.7	20.7
Roger Yap	7	51.4	30.0	46.7	66.7	4.8	2.3	1.7	1.00	0.50	2.8	8.8
Richard Yee	2	--	--	--	--	1.0	0.0	1.5	0.00	0.00	3.0	0.0

=== Sta. Lucia ===
Name	GP	2FG%	3FG%	FG%	FT%	Reb	Ast	TO	Stl	Blk	Fls	Pts
Marlou Aquino	6	41.7	0.0	40.8	50.0	3.6	1.4	1.9	0.14	0.43	1.9	7.0
Philip Butel	1	--	--	--	50.0	0.0	0.0	0.0	0.00	0.00	0.0	1.0
Christian Coronel	5	66.7	0.0	28.6	--	0.6	0.8	0.4	0.40	0.00	2.2	0.8
Dennis Daa	6	44.4	100.0	47.4	77.8	3.2	0.0	0.7	0.17	0.17	2.5	4.3
Dennis Espino	7	61.2	0.0	56.9	80.0	4.0	1.0	2.1	0.00	0.71	3.0	16.3
Norman Gonzales	7	44.4	40.0	42.1	69.2	1.6	0.0	0.0	0.29	0.00	2.1	4.1
Melvin Mamaclay	1	0.0	0.0	0.0	100.0	3.0	2.0	1.0	0.00	0.00	2.0	2.0
Paolo Mendoza	6	44.4	36.4	40.0	58.3	1.6	2.0	0.1	0.71	0.00	2.3	6.7
Dennis Miranda	7	45.9	50.0	46.3	83.3	2.9	4.0	1.6	0.86	0.14	3.4	9.3
Nelbert Omolon	7	56.3	44.4	53.0	58.3	4.0	0.7	2.4	0.86	0.86	4.6	13.1
Ryan Reyes	7	37.0	15.8	30.8	90.5	6.9	2.3	1.1	1.57	0.14	3.4	8.9
Kelly Williams	7	37.0	15.8	30.8	58.5	10.4	2.3	2.0	0.71	0.43	2.4	15.3
Joseph Yeo	6	50.0	36.8	45.5	79.4	3.3	2.0	1.5	0.38	0.00	1.9	14.0

== Broadcast notes ==
Game	Play-by-play	Analyst	Coach's Corner	Courtside Reporters
Game 1	Ed Picson	Quinito Henson	Norman Black	Dominic Uy and Paolo Trillo
Game 2	Mico Halili	Jason Webb	Norman Black	Patricia Bermudez-Hizon
Game 3	Mico Halili	Rado Dimalibot	Norman Black	Dominic Uy and Paolo Trillo
Game 4	Ed Picson	Quinito Henson	Norman Black	Magoo Marjon and Patricia Bermudez-Hizon
Game 5	Ed Picson	Quinito Henson	Norman Black	Dominic Uy and Paolo Trillo
Game 6	Mico Halili	Jason Webb	Norman Black	Richard del Rosario, Dominic Uy, Eric Reyes, Paolo Trillo and Marga Vargas
Game 7	Richard del Rosario	Jason Webb	Norman Black	Dominic Uy, Eric Reyes and Marga Vargas

== Suspensions and other issues ==
=== James Yap suspension ===
With Game 3 already decided, James Yap committed a flagrant foul (penalty 1) against Joseph Yeo. Yeo was driving to the basket when he passed the ball to a teammate; after that, Yap slapped Yeo in the face to mete a flagrant foul. Commissioner Sonny Barrios suspended Yap for a game and fined the 2005–06 MVP P20,000. Purefoods coach Ryan Gregorio remarked it as a "damning decision" while Realtors coach Boyet Fernandez said it was a "big boost" for his team. Yap served his suspension at Game 5 since notification to Gregorio arrived in the late evening.

In a related event, Purefoods alternate governor Rene Pardo resigned as chairman of the PBA ethics committee as a direct offshoot of the team’s disgruntlement on the way Barrios handled the James Yap case. Pardo said that, Barrios, who suspended Yap on the same day the commissioner met with some top Sta. Lucia officials at the EDSA Shangri-la Hotel, "the timing was awful. It should have been with some sense of propriety that the lunch offer was turned down." Barrios on his part didn't see anything wrong with the lunch meeting since the meeting was done at a public place.

Meanwhile, San Miguel Corporation pulled out their ads from the Associated Broadcasting Company (ABC)'s TV coverage. No reason was given. The league's technical head, Perry Martinez, went on an indefinite leave of absence after voicing his disagreement over Yap's suspension, due to "health issues."

=== Joseph Yeo suspension ===
With SLR on a fouling spree to conserve time on Game 4, Yeo committed a flagrant foul (penalty 2) when he hit Noy Castillo in the face. Yeo and Castillo then had a shouting spree before Castillo missed his two free throws. This would assure that Yeo will miss Game 5 along with James Yap.

Preceded by 2006–07	PBA Philippine Cup finals 2007–08	Succeeded by 2008–09
