= List of 2014–15 PBA season transactions =

== Retirement ==
| Date | Name | Team(s) played (years) | Age | Notes | Ref. |
|---|---|---|---|---|---|
| January 9 | Jimmy Alapag | Talk 'N Text Tropang Texters (2003–2015) | 37 | Jimmy Alapag formally announced his retirement during a press conference at the Smart Araneta Coliseum prior to the second game of the 2014–15 PBA Philippine Cup Finals between the Alaska Aces and the San Miguel Beermen | |
| May 18 | Kerby Raymundo | Redbull Thunder (2000–2001); B-Meg Llamados (2002–2012); Barangay Ginebra San Miguel (2012–2013); Meralco Bolts (2013) | 34 | | |

== Front office movements ==
=== Head coach changes ===
Off-season

| Hire date | Team | Outgoing head coach | Reason for departure | Incoming head coach | Last coaching position | Ref. |
|---|---|---|---|---|---|---|
| July 9 | Talk 'N Text | Norman Black | Moves to Meralco | Jong Uichico | Talk 'N Text asst coach (2013) | |
| August 2 | San Miguel | Biboy Ravanes | Demoted to assistant coach | Leo Austria | San Miguel asst coach (2014) | |

== Player movement ==
=== Trades ===
May 2015
May 4
| May 4 | To Barako Bull Energy: Joseph Yeo | To Barangay Ginebra San Miguel: Sol Mercado |
| May 24 | Three-team trade | |
| May 24 | To Meralco Bolts: Kelly Nabong (from Globalport) | To NLEX Road Warriors: John Wilson (from Meralco) |
| May 24 | To GlobalPort Batang Pier: 2016 Second round draft pick (from Ginebra or pick left unacquired by ROS [from NLEX or Meralco] whichever is higher) | |
July 2015
July 1
| July 1 | To Barako Bull Energy: Brian Heruela | To Blackwater Elite: Carlo Lastimosa |
July 3
| July 3 | To Barako Bull Energy: 2016 First round draft pick (from Globalport); 2018 Second round draft pick (from Globalport) (whichever is lower) | To GlobalPort Batang Pier: Joseph Yeo |
