= 2025–26 PBA Philippine Cup finals =

2026 edition of the PBA Philippine Cup finals

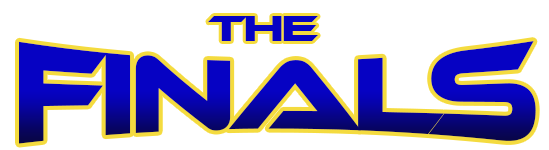
Team	Coach	Wins
(1) San Miguel Beermen	Leo Austria	4
(3) TNT Tropang 5G	Chot Reyes	2
- Dates: January 21 – February 1, 2026
- MVP: June Mar Fajardo
- Television: RPTV; PBA Rush (HD)
- Streaming: Cignal Play; Pilipinas Live; One Sports YouTube Channel
- Announcers: see Broadcast notes

Referees
- Game 1: Peter Balao, Mike Flordeliza, Mardy Montoya, Irewin Traballo
- Game 2: Rommel Gruta, Jerry Narandan, Albert Nubla, Kenny Hallig
- Game 3: Peter Balao, Bing Oliva, Irewin Traballo, James Paez
- Game 4: Peter Balao, Bing Oliva, James Paez, Karlo Vergara
- Game 5: Rommel Gruta, Bing Oliva, Mardy Montoya, Karlo Vergara
- Game 6: Peter Balao, Mike Flordeliza, Irewin Traballo, Karlo Vergara

PBA Philippine Cup finals chronology
- < 2025

PBA finals chronology
- < 2025 Philippine 2026 Commissioner's >

The 2025–26 PBA Philippine Cup finals was the championship series of the 2025–26 PBA Philippine Cup and the conclusion of the conference's playoffs. It was the first championship series of the Philippine Basketball Association (PBA)'s 2025–26 season. The best-of-seven series was contested between the San Miguel Beermen and the TNT Tropang 5G. The series began on January 21 and ended on February 1, 2026.

The San Miguel Beermen and the TNT Tropang 5G competed for the 47th Philippine Cup championship and the 139th overall championship contested by the league. In a rematch of the 2025 Philippine Cup finals, San Miguel entered this series as the current holders of the Jun Bernardino Trophy. San Miguel would defend their Philippine Cup triumph in six games. This was also SMB's 31st overall title and their 12th in the Philippine Cup.

Starting with this finals series, PBA announced that the trophy for PBA Finals MVP would be named in honor of the 19-time PBA champion Ramon Fernandez. June Mar Fajardo was the inaugural recipient of the Ramon Fernandez Trophy and became the first five-time Finals MVP in league history.

== Background ==
=== San Miguel Beermen ===
San Miguel Beermen lost its first two games to NLEX Road Warriors and Phoenix Fuel Masters. With the so-called "Depth Squad", playing assistant coach Chris Ross, and Leo Austria, they managed to go on a hot 9-game winning streak to clinch the top seed and secure a twice-to-beat advantage. In the Quarterfinals, they faced NLEX again, which they eliminated them with ease after coming back in the 3rd quarter, thus outscoring NLEX to get the lead. In the Semifinals, they met Barangay Ginebra San Miguel for the second time. Game 1 won in favor of Barangay Ginebra, thus ending their 10-game winning streak. To counter, they bounced back in Game 2, tying the series 1–1. In Game 3, Don Trollano was hot from the bench as he scored 33 points to secure a 2–1 series lead. By that time, June Mar Fajardo was experiencing strain on his shoulders, which he had since the Quarterfinals. That limited his points in both Games 3 (they won), and 4 (which they lost, thus tying the series, 2–2), but still managed to secure monster rebounds, one that is a mastermind on why they won in Games 2 and 3. In Game 5, he managed to secure a double-double 22 points and 11 rebounds to secure the lead again, 3–2. In Game 6, CJ Perez was hot in the first quarter, scoring 30 points, and finished with 41 points as the Beermen put the final nail on Ginebra despite threatening to edge the game even closer and to a decisive Game 7, 4 games to 2 to book a ticket to the finals and have another shot at the championship.

=== TNT Tropang 5G ===
TNT finished as the third seed in the elimination round with an 8–3 record, tied with the Rain or Shine Elasto Painters, and thus held twice-to-beat advantage in the quarterfinals. They then beat the Magnolia Chicken Timplados Hotshots in one game before taking on the sister team Meralco Bolts in the semifinals. They beat Meralco in five games to return to the finals. This will be the team's fourth straight finals appearance, after winning two of the last three finals in a near-Grand Slam finish in the previous season.

=== Road to the finals ===
San Miguel		TNT Tropang 5G
Finished 9–2 (.818), 1st place	Elimination round	Finished 8–3 (.727), tied for 2nd place with Rain or Shine
n/a	Tiebreaker	Head-to-head record: Rain or Shine 1–0 TNT
Def. NLEX, 101–94	Quarterfinals	Def. Magnolia, 118–109
Def. Barangay Ginebra, 4–2	Semifinals	Def. Meralco, 4–1

=== Head-to-head matchup ===
RPTV

December 5, 2025
7:30 pm

Box score

San Miguel Beermen 110, TNT Tropang 5G 95
Scoring by quarter: 23–20, 20–27, 39–14, 28–34
Pts: Perez 33; Rebs: Fajardo 17; Asts: four players 3	Pts: Heading 18; Rebs: Galinato 7 Asts: Enciso 9

Ynares Center, Antipolo, Rizal
Referees: Peter Balao, Mike Flordeliza, Jerry Narandan, Karlo Vergara

== Series summary ==
Game	Date	Venue	Winner	Result
Game 1	January 21, 2026	Ynares Center	TNT	96–91
Game 2	January 23, 2026	Ynares Center	San Miguel	111–92
Game 3	January 25, 2026	SM Mall of Asia Arena	San Miguel	95–89
Game 4	January 28, 2026	SM Mall of Asia Arena	TNT	110–87
Game 5	January 30, 2026	Ynares Center	San Miguel	96–82
Game 6	February 1, 2026	SM Mall of Asia Arena	San Miguel	92–77

== Game summaries ==
=== Game 1 ===
RPTV

January 21, 2026
7:30 pm

Box score

San Miguel Beermen 91, TNT Tropang 5G 96
Scoring by quarter: 20–29, 16–24, 28–17, 27–26
Pts: Fajardo 24; Rebs: Fajardo 17; Asts: Perez 6	Pts: Williams 15; Rebs: Oftana 10; Asts: Nambatac 6
TNT leads series, 1–0

Ynares Center, Antipolo, Rizal
Referees: Peter Balao, Mike Flordeliza, Mardy Montoya, Irewin Traballo

In the second quarter, Glenn Khobuntin of TNT pushes the lead of TNT to 48–29, the biggest lead of the game. By the end of the third quarter, San Miguel rallied to cut the lead to 6, but it wasn't enough to complete the comeback after TNT stayed strong at the end of the game, despite crunch time in the closing minutes of the fourth quarter.

=== Game 2 ===
RPTV

January 23, 2026
7:30 pm

Box score

San Miguel Beermen 111, TNT Tropang 5G 92
Scoring by quarter: 30–18, 27–15, 18–28, 36–31
Pts: Trollano 22; Rebs: Fajardo 16; Asts: Perez 5	Pts: Nambatac 17; Rebs: Ganuelas-Rosser 6 Asts: Jalalon 7
Series tied, 1–1

Ynares Center, Antipolo, Rizal
Referees: Rommel Gruta, Jerry Narandan, Albert Nubla, Kenny Hallig

San Miguel turned the 44–33 lead in the second quarter into a 57–33 heading into the half. TNT tried to come back, where they cut their deficit to 10 in the beginning of the fourth quarter. San Miguel then expanded the lead into 90–67, but TNT cut San Miguel's lead again to 10. However, San Miguel ultimately controlled the lead until the end of the game, tying the series.

=== Game 3 ===
RPTV

January 25, 2026
7:30 pm

Box score

San Miguel Beermen 95, TNT Tropang 5G 89
Scoring by quarter: 33–19, 11–31, 23–22, 28–17
Pts: Perez 20; Rebs: Fajardo 27; Asts: Perez 4	Pts: Oftana 25; Rebs: Ganuelas-Rosser 13; Asts: Heading 11
San Miguel leads series, 2–1

SM Mall of Asia Arena, Pasay
Referees: Peter Balao, Bing Oliva, Irewin Traballo, James Paez

CJ Perez of San Miguel struggled in the first three quarters of the game, but in the fourth quarter, Perez scored 17 points, which also includes 7 points scored in the final minute of regulation. According to Perez, it was not part of his play, but he stated that it just so happened for the last two shots to go in. On the other hand, Calvin Oftana of TNT led the scoring with 25 points, but it wasn't enough to win the game, now falling behind 1–2 to San Miguel.

=== Game 4 ===
RPTV

January 28, 2026
7:35 pm

Box score

San Miguel Beermen 87, TNT Tropang 5G 110
Scoring by quarter: 18–35, 22–30, 21–22, 26–23
Pts: Fajardo 18; Rebs: Fajardo 16; Asts: Perez 4	Pts: Oftana 29; Rebs: Oftana 6 Asts: Heading 6
Series tied, 2–2

SM Mall of Asia Arena, Pasay
Referees: Peter Balao, Bing Oliva, James Paez, Karlo Vergara

Prior to the start of the game, San Miguel Beermen's June Mar Fajardo awarded his 13th Best Player of the Conference award, extending his record for most career BPC awards.

Being down 1–2, Calvin Oftana of TNT led the team scoring with 29 points on 5-of-8 shooting from three-point range. In the first minutes of the second quarter, RR Pogoy re-injured his hamstring while going for a steal against CJ Perez. Despite the injury, TNT still blew San Miguel with a 23-point win, turning the series into a virtual best-of-3.

=== Game 5 ===
RPTV

January 30, 2026
7:30 pm

Box score

San Miguel Beermen 96, TNT Tropang 5G 82
Scoring by quarter: 19–29, 28–19, 30–13, 19–21
Pts: Brondial 17; Rebs: Brondial 15; Asts: Tautuaa 7	Pts: Oftana 20; Rebs: Oftana 9 Asts: Ganuelas-Rosser 4
San Miguel leads series, 3–2

Ynares Center, Antipolo, Rizal
Referees: Rommel Gruta, Bing Oliva, Mardy Montoya, Karlo Vergara

TNT started strong in the first quarter, taking a 23–7 lead halfway through the first quarter. However, San Miguel evaporated TNT's lead and cut it down to one, 48–47. They went on to outscore TNT in the third quarter, 30–13, taking the lead for good. San Miguel lost June Mar Fajardo briefly in the third and fourth quarters with a knee issue, though he managed to score 14 points and 11 rebounds.

=== Game 6 ===
RPTV

February 1, 2026
7:30 pm

Box score

San Miguel Beermen 92, TNT Tropang 5G 77
Scoring by quarter: 26–10, 23–29, 21–29, 22–9
Pts: Fajardo 29; Rebs: Fajardo 23; Asts: Perez 7	Pts: Oftana 28; Rebs: Oftana 7 Asts: Heading, Oftana 5
San Miguel wins series, 4–2

SM Mall of Asia Arena, Pasay
Attendance: 14,201
Referees: Peter Balao, Mike Flordeliza, Irewin Traballo, Karlo Vergara

San Miguel took an early lead into the game, surging into a 26–5 lead. But Calvin Oftana of TNT would quickly evaporate it and would score 14 points in a row, followed by a basket by Glenn Khobuntin, cutting the lead down to five, creating a 16–0 run for TNT. In the third quarter, TNT led 68–66 after Jordan Heading scores a three-pointer, but San Miguel quickly recovered where they unleashed a 10–0 run, turning it into a 76–68. Since then, TNT can no longer grab the lead back, and San Miguel won the Philippine Cup title for the second time in a row. June Mar Fajardo was named Finals MVP.

== Rosters ==
San Miguel Beermen roster
Players
Coaches

Pos.	#	POB	Name	Height	Weight	DOB (YYYY–MM–DD)	From
G	1	(United States)	Kris Rosales	6 ft 0 in (1.83 m)	165 lb (75 kg)	1990–12–20	Hope International
F	2	(Philippines)	Don Trollano	6 ft 3 in (1.91 m)	182 lb (83 kg)	1992–01–07	Adamson
F/C	3	(United States)	Moala Tautuaa	6 ft 8 in (2.03 m)	245 lb (111 kg)	1989–04–30	Chadron State
G	6	(United States)	Chris Ross	6 ft 1 in (1.85 m)	180 lb (82 kg)	1985–03–09	Marshall
F	11	(Sweden)	Andreas Cahilig	6 ft 5 in (1.96 m)		1991–01–22	EARIST
G/F	13	(United States)	Marcio Lassiter	6 ft 2 in (1.88 m)	185 lb (84 kg)	1987–05–16	Cal State Fullerton
C	15	(Philippines)	June Mar Fajardo	6 ft 10 in (2.08 m)	268 lb (122 kg)	1989–11–17	Cebu
G/F	21	(Philippines)	Jeron Teng	6 ft 2 in (1.88 m)	185 lb (84 kg)	1994–03–21	De La Salle
C	22	(Philippines)	JM Calma	6 ft 6 in (1.98 m)	193 lb (88 kg)	1997–12–02	San Sebastian
G/F	23	(Australia)	Royce Mantua (R)	6 ft 4 in (1.93 m)		2002–04–12	Adamson
G	33	(Philippines)	Juami Tiongson	5 ft 10 in (1.78 m)	175 lb (79 kg)	1991–02–05	Ateneo
G	39	(Philippines)	Jericho Cruz	6 ft 1 in (1.85 m)	190 lb (86 kg)	1990–10–11	Adamson
G	55	(United States)	Chris Miller (R)	6 ft 2 in (1.88 m)	180 lb (82 kg)	1993–08–31	Salem
G/F	77	(Hong Kong)	CJ Perez	6 ft 2 in (1.88 m)	185 lb (84 kg)	1993–11–17	Lyceum
F	91	(Philippines)	Rodney Brondial	6 ft 5 in (1.96 m)	210 lb (95 kg)	1990–11–20	Adamson

Head coach

- (Philippines) Leo Austria

Assistant coach(es)

- (Philippines) Peter Martin (1st assistant)
- (Philippines) Ato Agustin
- (Philippines) Dayong Mendoza
- (Philippines) Biboy Ravanes
- (United States) Chris Ross
- (Philippines) Boyzie Zamar
- (Philippines) Jorge Gallent (consultant)

Team manager

- (Philippines) Gee Abanilla
- (Philippines) Daniel Henares (assistant)

Legend

- (C) Team captain
- (CI) Commissioner's Cup Import
- (GI) Governors' Cup Import
- (EI) EASL Import
- (DP) Unsigned draft pick
- (FA) Free agent
- (IN) Inactive
- (S) Suspended
- (R) Rookie
- Injured

Roster

TNT Tropang 5G roster
Players
Coaches

Pos.	#	POB	Name	Height	Weight	DOB (YYYY–MM–DD)	From
G	0	(United States)	Simon Enciso	5 ft 11 in (1.80 m)	185 lb (84 kg)	1991–02–12	Notre Dame de Namur
F	2	(United States)	Tyrus Hill	6 ft 5 in (1.96 m)	185 lb (84 kg)	1996–03–20	De La Salle
G	6	(Philippines)	Rey Nambatac	5 ft 11 in (1.80 m)		1994–01–27	Letran
C	7	(Philippines)	Poy Erram	6 ft 8 in (2.03 m)	227 lb (103 kg)	1989–07–07	Ateneo
F	8	(Philippines)	Calvin Oftana	6 ft 5 in (1.96 m)	196 lb (89 kg)	1996–01–03	San Beda
F	9	(United States)	Paul Varilla (IN)	6 ft 3 in (1.91 m)	185 lb (84 kg)	1993–08–10	UE
F	12	(Philippines)	Glenn Khobuntin	6 ft 4 in (1.93 m)	195 lb (88 kg)	1991–09–07	National-U
F	14	(Philippines)	Mike Nieto	6 ft 2 in (1.88 m)	200 lb (91 kg)	1997–05–31	Ateneo
G	15	(Australia)	Jordan Heading	6 ft 2 in (1.88 m)	189 lb (86 kg)	1996–01–30	Cal Baptist
G/F	16	(Philippines)	Roger Pogoy (C)	6 ft 2 in (1.88 m)	180 lb (82 kg)	1992–06–16	Far Eastern
G	17	(Philippines)	Jayson Castro (injured) (FA)	5 ft 10 in (1.78 m)	185 lb (84 kg)	1986–06–30	Philippine Christian
F/C	21	(United States)	Kelly Williams	6 ft 6 in (1.98 m)	215 lb (98 kg)	1982–02–07	Oakland
G	26	(Philippines)	Almond Vosotros (IN)	5 ft 10 in (1.78 m)	170 lb (77 kg)	1990–01–26	De La Salle
G	28	(Philippines)	Jio Jalalon	5 ft 9 in (1.75 m)	150 lb (68 kg)	1992–08–02	Arellano
F/C	32	(United States)	Henry Galinato	6 ft 6 in (1.98 m)	245 lb (111 kg)	1997–09–09	Philippines
G/F	35	(Philippines)	Kim Aurin	6 ft 1 in (1.85 m)	190 lb (86 kg)	1997–02–05	UPHSD
F/C	45	(United States)	Brandon Ganuelas-Rosser	6 ft 6 in (1.98 m)	220 lb (100 kg)	1994–06–29	UC Riverside
F	77	(Philippines)	Kevin Ferrer	6 ft 5 in (1.96 m)	188 lb (85 kg)	1993–03–26	UST
F	–	(Philippines)	Joe Celzo (R)	6 ft 4 in (1.93 m)		2000–04–25	San Beda

Head coach

- (Philippines) Chot Reyes

Assistant coach(es)

- (Philippines) Josh Reyes (1st assistant)
- (Philippines) Sandy Arespacochaga
- (Philippines) Ranidel de Ocampo
- (Philippines) Yuri Escueta
- (Philippines) Ryan Reyes
- (Philippines) Bong Ravena

Team manager

- (Philippines) Jojo Lastimosa
- (Philippines) Yvette Ruiz (assistant)

Legend

- (C) Team captain
- (CI) Commissioner's Cup Import
- (GI) Governors' Cup Import
- (EI) EASL Import
- (DP) Unsigned draft pick
- (FA) Free agent
- (IN) Inactive
- (S) Suspended
- (R) Rookie
- Injured

Roster

== Broadcast notes ==
Under the league's partnership with TV5 Network, the series will be aired on RPTV with simulcasts on PBA Rush and Pilipinas Live (both in standard and high definition). The PBA Rush broadcast provided the English language coverage of the finals. The Pilipinas Live also provided the English-Filipino language coverage of the finals.

Due to Sev Sarmenta's commitment to the 2026 Philippine Women's Open, he only called a single game, the series-clinching Game 6. After his retirement from basketball, Gabe Norwood debuted as an analyst for PBA Rush in this finals.

Game	RPTV			PBA Rush		
Game	Play-by-play	Analyst(s)	Courtside reporter	Play-by-play	Analyst	Courtside reporter
Game 1	Charlie Cuna	Quinito Henson and Jong Uichico	Belle Gregorio	Paolo Del Rosario	Mark Molina	Bea Escudero
Game 2	Magoo Marjon	Andy Jao and Ryan Gregorio	Belle Gregorio	Anthony Suntay	Ronnie Magsanoc	Bea Escudero
Game 3	Jutt Sulit	Dominic Uy and Richard del Rosario	Eileen Shi	Carlo Pamintuan	Gabe Norwood	Belle Gregorio
Game 4	Charlie Cuna	Quinito Henson and Luigi Trillo	Eileen Shi	Andre Co	Norman Black	Bea Escudero
Game 5	Magoo Marjon	Andy Jao and Ryan Gregorio	Apple David	Paolo Del Rosario	Ronnie Magsanoc	Belle Gregorio
Game 6	Sev Sarmenta	Dominic Uy and Norman Black	Apple David	Carlo Pamintuan	Gabe Norwood	Belle Gregorio

- Additional crew:
  - Trophy presentation: Jutt Sulit
  - Celebration interviewer: Apple David and Belle Gregorio
