= Joseph Yeo =

Filipino basketball player

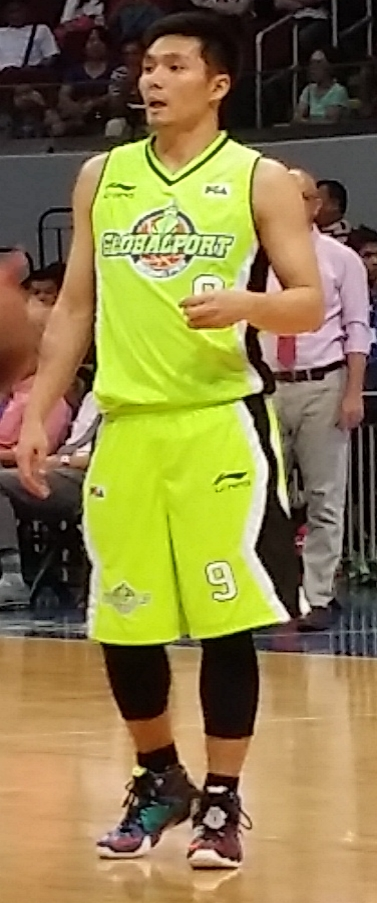
- Yeo with the GlobalPort Batang Pier in 2015

Personal information
- Born: September 7, 1983 (age 43)
- Listed height: 6 ft 1 in (1.85 m)
- Listed weight: 175 lb (79 kg)

Career information
- High school: Xavier School (San Juan)
- College: De La Salle
- PBA draft: 2006: 1st round, 3rd overall pick
- Drafted by: Coca-Cola Tigers
- Playing career: 2006–2022
- Position: Shooting guard

Career history
- 2006–2007: Coca-Cola Tigers
- 2007–2010: Sta. Lucia Realtors
- 2010–2013: San Miguel Beermen / Petron Blaze Boosters
- 2013–2014: Air21 Express
- 2014–2015: Barangay Ginebra San Miguel
- 2015: Barako Bull Energy
- 2015–2016: GlobalPort Batang Pier
- 2016–2017: Meralco Bolts
- 2018; 2022: Manila Stars

Career highlights
- 2× PBA champion (2007–08 Philippine, 2011 Governors'); 2× PBA All-Star (2007, 2009); PBL champion (2005); PBL Unity Cup Finals MVP (2005); UAAP champion (2001, 2004 (Note: Forfeited due to the scandal that leaked out the following season)); UAAP Mythical Five (2005)

Joseph Henry Lim Yeo (born September 7, 1983) is a Filipino former professional basketball player. Nicknamed "The Ninja", he was drafted third overall by the Coca-Cola Tigers in 2006. He played 11 years in the PBA, winning two titles before having two different stints in the MPBL.

== Early life and amateur career ==
Yeo had been playing basketball since he was four years old, often against his cousin or his father. He looked up to PBA player Vergel Meneses. His father guided his development, enrolling him at a MILO basketball clinic. He took his primary and secondary education at Xavier School. In his senior year, he, alongside Ty Tang and Chris Tiu, led the Xavier Golden Stallions to a Tiong Lian Juniors title.

Yeo then played for the De La Salle Green Archers. Other schools from the NCAA tried to recruit him, but he chose DLSU as it was his dream school. He had also been practicing with DLSU since his third year of high school. He joined a rookie class that included Carlo Sharma and eventual Rookie of the Year Mark Cardona. As a rookie, playing limited minutes, he was a part of the Green Archers team that completed its quest for a four-peat by defeating Ateneo in the 2001 UAAP finals. From a UAAP rookie year in 2001 where he averaged of 3.4 points, 1.5 rebounds, 1.5 assists, and 9.5 minutes per game, he improved this to an average statline of 11.3 points, 3.3 rebounds, 2.4 assists, and 23.3 minutes in the 2004 season. In his final year, he was named to the Mythical Team. He led them to another finals appearance, but they lost to the FEU Tamaraws.

In the PBL, he led his team, Harbour Centre Batang Pier, to its first PBL crown alongside ex-Ateneo star LA Tenorio by winning the 2006 Unity Cup finals against Toyota Otis.

== Professional career ==
=== Coca-Cola Tigers (2006–2007) ===
Yeo was drafted by the now-defunct Coca-Cola Tigers as third overall pick in 2006, just behind Kelly Williams and Arwind Santos. As a rookie, he played limited minutes as a reliever to Tiger's main-man John Arigo. Despite the limited playing time, he still managed to average 10 points, 4.6 rebounds and 1.2 assists in 26 minutes per contest halfway into the elimination round of the 2006-07 PBA Philippine Cup. For the season, he averaged 7.4 points in 32 games.

=== Sta. Lucia Realtors (2007–2010) ===
In 2007, he was traded, along with a future draft pick, to Sta. Lucia for forwards Mark Isip and Cesar Catli. As a Realtor, he effectively played his off-the-bench role, winding up as the team's second-best scorer behind Kelly Williams with a 13.5-point average, and became a vital cog of the team that won the 2007–08 PBA Philippine Cup. In Game 2 of the PBA finals, he scored 16 points as Sta. Lucia took a 2–0 lead. Purefoods took Game 3 and in Game 4, he was flagrantly fouled by James Yap. Yeo retaliated, and as a result, was banned from Game 5. His teammates were able to step up in his absence, and Sta. Lucia won the championship in seven games. During the 2008 Fiesta Conference, against the Talk 'N Text Phone Pals, he led his team with 29 points to send Sta. Lucia to the quarterfinals.

During the 2008–09 Philippine Cup, Yeo scored a career-high 38 points in a win over the San Miguel Beermen.

=== San Miguel Beermen / Petron Blaze Boosters (2010–2013) ===
In 2010, he was dealt to San Miguel Beermen for Bonbon Custodio. While playing for the Beermen, he spent most of his time on the bench and in the injured list, and did not play with the team that won the 2011 PBA Governors' Cup championship. The following season, although he had recuperated from his injury, he was often on the bench.

=== Air21 Express (2013–2014) ===
During the midseason of the 2013 Governors' Cup, Yeo was shipped to Air21 Express in a one-on-one swap with Mark Isip. This reunited him with his college coach Franz Pumaren and college teammate Mark Cardona. With Taulava returning to the PBA after a stint in the ASEAN Basketball League, the two were able to form a potent pick and roll partnership. In the quarterfinals of the Governors' Cup, they won the first game of their series against the Alaska Aces with him contributing 21 points and seven assists.

During the 2013–14 PBA Philippine Cup, Yeo recorded his first career triple-double with 19 points, 10 rebounds and a career-high 14 assists in a win over the GlobalPort Batang Pier. He also switched his role from shooting guard to point guard during the absence of Simon Atkins. In an upset win over defending champions Talk 'N Text, he had 12 assists and 13 points, as well as the go-ahead basket. He switched back to his natural two-guard position once Atkins returned from injury and after the team acquired a true point guard in Jonas Villanueva. In a do-or-die game during the Commissioner's Cup quarterfinals against the #2 seed Beermen, he was ejected in the first half for hitting Chris Ross in the groin area. Despite losing him for the rest of the game, Air21 was able to upset San Miguel to break into the semifinals. He then helped Air21 win its first game of the semifinals over the San Mig Coffee Mixers. San Mig was eventually able to close them out, 3–2. In the Governors' Cup, against San Mig, he made a clutch three-pointer with 1.9 seconds remaining that sent the game into overtime. However, in overtime, he turned the ball over, which led to game-sealing free throws. They bounced back with a win over Air21, in which he had 13 points, eight rebounds and four assists. For the 2013–14 season, Yeo averaged 12.4 points, 4.1 rebounds and 4.3 assists in 31 minutes per game. His minutes played, rebounding and assists marks were all career-highs while his scoring output was his highest since he averaged 13.5 points for now-defunct Sta. Lucia in 2008–09, his third year in the league.

=== Barangay Ginebra (2014–2015) ===
Right before Air21 sold its franchise to NLEX, he was traded to the Barangay Ginebra for a 2015 1st-round pick. In his first four games with the team, he only averaged six points. In his first time playing in the Manila Clasico, a match against Ginebra's long-time rival Star Hotshots, he had 17 points hitting 5-of-8 on threes, and adding five assists in the win. He then followed it up by going 5-of-8 once again from three in a win over Barako Bull Energy.

=== Barako Bull (2015) ===
On May 4, 2015, Joseph Yeo traded by the Ginebra to the Barako Bull in exchange for guard Sol Mercado two days before the Governors' Cup. Against the Meralco Bolts, he scored 28 points with a team-high six assists as Barako started the conference as the last undefeated team. As a result, he was awarded as the PBA Player of the Week. He had a double-double of 19 points and 10 assists as Barako stayed on top of the standings. Then, in a loss to the KIA Carnival, he was held to zero points on 0-of-11 shooting. In his first game against former team Ginebra, he finished with 18 points and seven assists but committed five turnovers as they suffered a blowout loss.

=== GlobalPort Batang Pier (2015–16) ===
On July 3, 2015, Yeo was traded by Barako Bull to the GlobalPort Batang Pier in exchange for a 2016 1st-round pick. During the 2016 Commissioner's Cup, he was benched for two straight games despite GlobalPort missing star guards Stanley Pringle and Terrence Romeo. In the final game of the season, with GlobalPort out of playoff contention, he scored a season-high 37 points on nine three-pointers and 12-of-22 shooting, along with six assists and four rebounds off the bench for a win over the Blackwater Elite. It was the most he had scored in seven seasons, and just one point shy of his career-high of 38 points.

In the offseason, Yeo played for Mighty Sports in the 2016 Merlion Cup. They made it to the finals before losing to the Shanghai Sharks off a Jimmer Fredette buzzer-beater.

=== Meralco Bolts (2016–2017) ===
On October 28, 2016, the Meralco Bolts acquired Yeo from GlobalPort by trading Rey Guevarra. In the 2017 Governors' Cup, Meralco made it to the finals, where they lost in seven games to Ginebra. His contract was not renewed at the end of the season.

=== Manila Stars (2018, 2022) ===
==== First stint (2018) ====
Now a free agent, Yeo explored his options. In 2018, his friend Bong Tan, owner of Alab Pilipinas, wanted him on the ABL team. However, head coach Jimmy Alapag was against bringing him on. This led to Tan and Alab parting ways, and Alab underwent new sponsorship.

Later that year, Yeo joined the Manila Stars, an expansion team in the Maharlika Pilipinas Basketball League (MPBL), an amateur league at the time. Manila made it to the North Division finals before falling to the San Juan Knights.

==== Second stint (2022) ====
In 2019, he rejoined Mighty Sports for the 2019 Dubai International Basketball Tournament. This offered him the chance to reteam with high school teammates Chris Tiu and TY Tang, who had come out of retirement. He also competed with the team in the 2019 Jones Cup, in which they swept the tournament, and the 2020 Dubai International Basketball Tournament, in which they won the championship.

By 2022, Yeo was already retired from playing in pro leagues. That year, he joined the Stars once again. By this time, the MPBL was a professional league, making the MPBL the second professional league he has played for in his career. In his first game back, he had 12 points, seven rebounds, six assists, and two steals, but they lost to the Marikina Shoemasters.

== Player profile ==
Yeo is known for his dribble-drives and ability to make acrobatic layups. As time went on, he was able to blend his skills to become a capable ball handler, slasher, and shooter, especially in pick and roll. On defense, he provided energy, hustle, and quickness to shadow the opposing team's perimeter players. This was seen in college, as he was one of the keys as to why Franz Pumaren's full-court pressure schemes were successful.

== Personal life ==
He married Angela Medalla on May 27, 2008, and their baby named Mariana Zaria M. Yeo was born on September 3, 2008, and in January 2012, another baby girl, named Helena, was born.

Yeo was also notable for his on and off-court feud with college rival, former King Eagle Enrico Villanueva. During the PBA-sanctioned Ateneo-La Salle Dream Games in December 2005, he elbowed Villanueva at the forehead as the latter was rebounding the ball. In 2006, another incident happened pitting the two rivals was after the game between his team Coca-Cola and Villanueva's Red Bull Barako, when they engaged in a parking lot brawl. They were both summoned by then-PBA Commissioner Noli Eala. He has since apologized to Villanueva. When Villanueva was traded to Air21 in March 2014, he clarified that their old quarrel has long been a thing of the past.

== PBA career statistics ==
Legend
GP	Games played	MPG	Minutes per game
FG%	Field-goal percentage	3P%	3-point field-goal percentage	FT%	Free-throw percentage
RPG	Rebounds per game	APG	Assists per game	SPG	Steals per game
BPG	Blocks per game	PPG	Points per game	**Bold**	Career high

=== Season-by-season averages ===
Year	Team	GP	MPG	FG%	3P%	FT%	RPG	APG	SPG	BPG	PPG
2006–07	Coca-Cola	32	16.4	.289	.208	.575	2.5	.9	.7	.1	7.4
2007–08	Sta. Lucia	**52**	22.3	.373	**.375**	.703	3.0	2.5	.5	.1	10.5
2008–09	Sta. Lucia	44	26.6	**.392**	.287	.742	3.6	2.2	**.9**	**.2**	**13.5**
2009–10	Sta. Lucia	50	20.6	.351	.305	.688	2.4	2.2	.4	.1	8.6
2009–10	San Miguel	50	20.6	.351	.305	.688	2.4	2.2	.4	.1	8.6
2010–11	San Miguel / Petron	40	15.3	.346	.318	**.816**	1.8	1.3	.3	.0	5.2
2011–12	Petron	46	26.0	.379	.313	.667	3.4	2.9	.4	.0	8.8
2012–13	Petron	30	20.7	.387	.333	.487	2.2	2.2	.3	.0	6.4
2012–13	Air21	30	20.7	.387	.333	.487	2.2	2.2	.3	.0	6.4
2013–14	Air21	40	**31.0**	.378	.325	.691	**4.1**	**4.3**	.6	.0	12.4
2014–15	Barangay Ginebra	36	25.9	.351	.290	.750	2.9	3.7	.5	.1	10.0
2014–15	Barako Bull	36	25.9	.351	.290	.750	2.9	3.7	.5	.1	10.0
2015–16	GlobalPort	36	23.8	.337	.280	.693	2.4	1.8	.2	.1	8.6
2016–17	Meralco	17	9.1	.329	.267	.692	.7	.9	.1	.1	4.1
Career		423	22.5	.361	.306	.693	2.8	2.4	.5	.1	9.1
