= Jericho Cruz =

Filipino basketball player

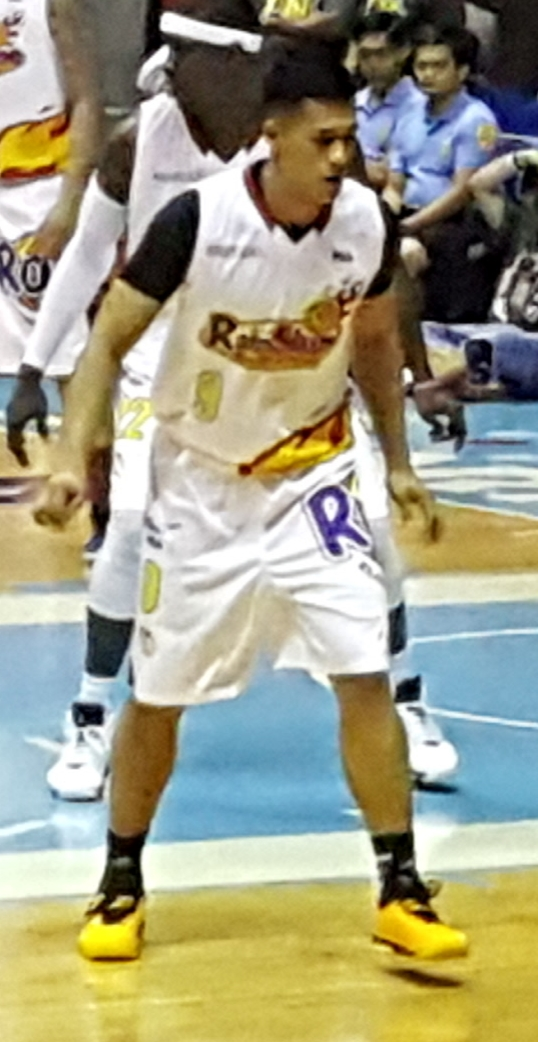
- Cruz with Rain or Shine in 2016

No. 39 – San Miguel Beermen
- Position: Shooting guard / point guard
- League: PBA

Personal information
- Born: October 11, 1990 (age 36) Pasig, Philippines
- Listed height: 6 ft 1 in (1.85 m)
- Listed weight: 190 lb (86 kg)

Career information
- High school: Marianas High School (Susupe, Saipan)
- College: RTU; Adamson
- PBA draft: 2014: 1st round, 9th overall pick
- Drafted by: Rain or Shine Elasto Painters
- Playing career: 2014–present

Career history
- 2014–2018: Rain or Shine Elasto Painters
- 2018–2019: TNT KaTropa
- 2019–2022: NLEX Road Warriors
- 2022–present: San Miguel Beermen

Career highlights
- 5× PBA champion (2016 Commissioner's, 2022 Philippine, 2023–24 Commissioner's, 2025 Philippine, 2025–26 Philippine); PBA Finals MVP (2025 Philippine); 4× PBA All-Star (2016–2018, 2026); PBA Most Improved Player (2016); PBA All-Rookie Team (2015); 2× PBA Mr. Quality Minutes (2016, 2023)
Medals
Men's basketball
Philippines
SEA Games
Gold medal – first place	2013 Naypyidaw	Team
Men's basketball
Guam
Micronesian Games
Gold medal – first place	2010 Koror	Team

Jericho Xavier Setubal Cruz (born October 11, 1990) is a Filipino-Guamanian professional basketball player for the San Miguel Beermen of the Philippine Basketball Association (PBA). He has earned multiple accolades throughout his career, including five PBA titles and a Finals MVP award. Internationally, he has won a gold medal with the Philippines at the 2013 SEA Games and is currently competing for Guam in major FIBA tournaments.

== Early life and high school ==
Cruz was born in Pasig of Metro Manila in the Philippines but would spend most of his childhood in Saipan of the Northern Mariana Islands.

Prior to 2004, he would play basketball for the G-Rollers of Garapan.

He would attend the Marianas High School for his secondary education.

== College career ==
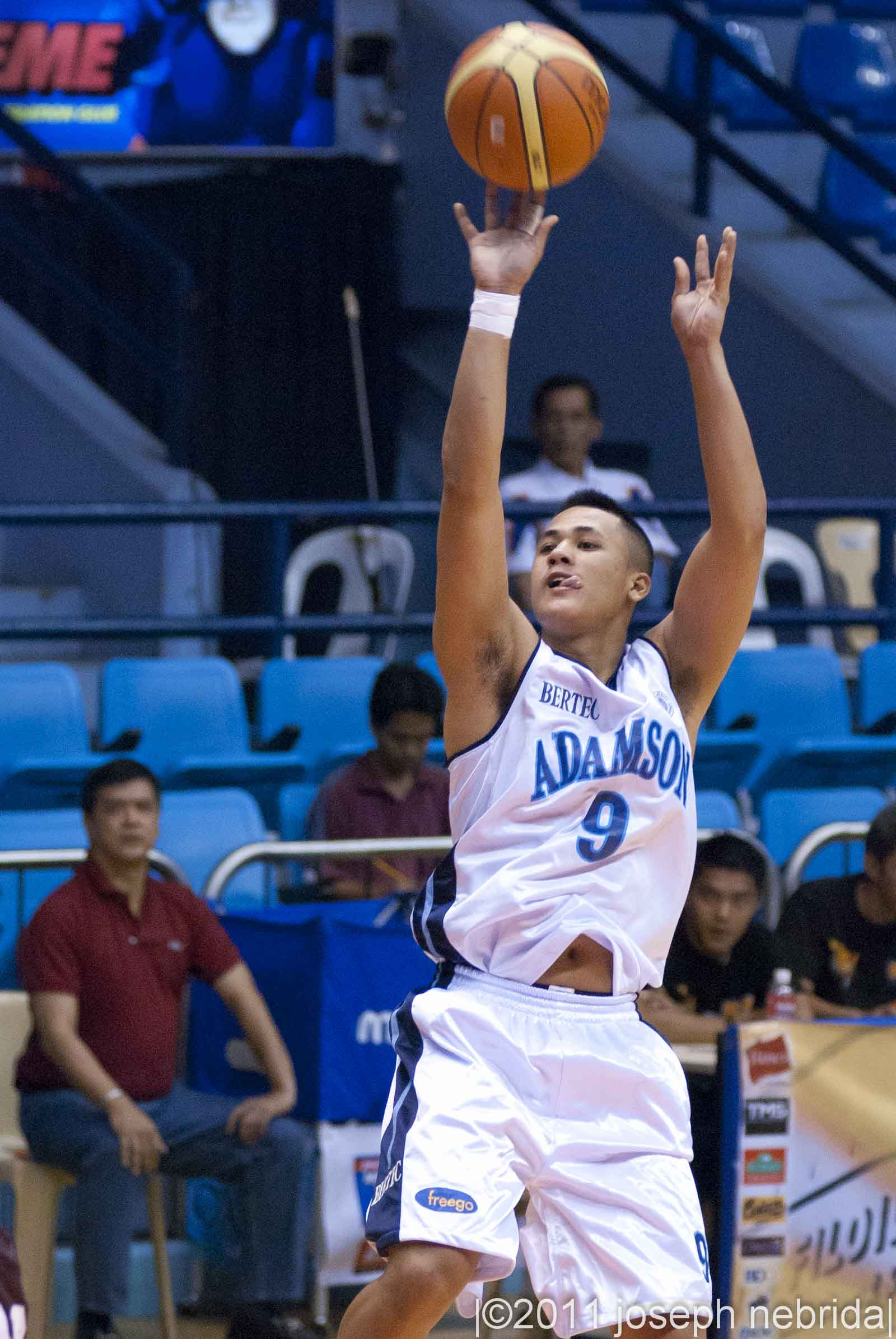
Cruz with Adamson in 2011

Cruz decided to try his luck in the Philippines to pursue a nursing degree. He was playing basketball in a barangay league in Cainta, where his uncle lived, when he was discovered by the coach of Rizal Technological University. He initially played for RTU in 2010, the same year when the Blue Thunder ruled the State Colleges and Universities Athletic Association.

He was also a member of RTU's two-time runner up squad in the National Capital Region Athletic Association where the Blue Thunder lost to Olivarez College in 2010 and Colegio de Sta. Monica in 2011. He was a member of the Mythical Team in 2011.

Cruz was spotted by then Adamson Soaring Falcons coach Leo Austria while playing in a tournament in Bacolod as well as in the 2010 Philippine University Games in Dumaguete City, who then recruited him. He averaged 10.1 points per game in his first tour of duty with the Falcons in the 2011 FilOil Flying V Preseason tournament then averaged 12.3 markers per outing in his rookie year with Adamson in the 2012 UAAP season. He then averaged 14 points per game in the 2013 UAAP season, but they did not make the playoffs. After the season, Austria stepped down as Adamson's head coach. Cruz then elected to forgo his final year with the Falcons and applied for the 2014 PBA draft.

== Professional career ==
=== Rain or Shine Elasto Painters (2014–2018) ===
Cruz was drafted 9th overall by Rain or Shine in the 2014 PBA draft. In the preseason, he was fined ₱20,000 for hitting Enrico Villanueva in a preseason brawl.

On December 5, 2014, he registered his first breakout game against Alaska, finishing with 16 points on 6-for-7 shooting and made a clutch go-ahead putback with 18.5 seconds remaining. Two days later, he suffered a broken foot during their game against Ginebra and was out for the rest of the All-Filipino conference. He returned to active play in the 2015 Commissioner's Cup playoffs. He was named to the All-Rookie Team for the 2014–15 season.

Cruz began the 2015–16 season with 15 points and five rebounds in a win over the Star Hotshots. He then had what was his career-high of 23 points in a win over the Blackwater Elite. In the Commissioner's Cup, he was Rain or Shine's second-leading scorer behind J.R. Quiñahan. Rain or Shine went on to win the title that conference, with him as their second-leading scorer behind Paul Lee. During the 2016 All-Star Weekend, he made his first appearance at the All-Star Game for the South Team and won the Shooting Stars contest. He was recognized during the 2016 PBA Leo Awards as he bagged the Most Improved Player trophy and won the Mr. Quality Minutes from the PBA Press Corps Awards.

In the offseason, Quiñahan and Lee departed from the team, as did head coach Yeng Guiao. In the 2016–17 Philippine Cup, Cruz was able to lead Rain or Shine to its ninth straight playoff appearance in the Philippine Cup. Throughout the 2017 Commissioner's Cup, he dealt with a plantar fasciitis injury on his right foot. He was also an All-Star that season for the Visayas team.

During the 2017–18 season, Cruz requested to be traded away from the team.

=== TNT KaTropa (2018–2019) ===
On February 15, 2018, Cruz was traded to TNT KaTropa in exchange for rookie Sidney Onwubere, Kris Rosales, and a 2018 first-round pick. In his TNT debut, he had 17 points, four assists, three rebounds, and two steals and a win over the NLEX Road Warriors. He helped them secure the last slot in the 2017–18 Philippine Cup playoffs. He made the All-Star game as well for a third straight season.

During the 2019 Philippine Cup, Cruz injured his hamstring during a team practice. Expected to be out for a month, he came back six days earlier. In April, he was placed back on the injury reserve due to his hamstring and was unable to play for two months.

=== NLEX Road Warriors (2019–2022) ===
On June 10, 2019, Cruz was traded to the NLEX Road Warriors in a three-team trade involving NLEX, TNT, and NorthPort Batang Pier. The trade reunited him with Guiao and Quiñahan. Although they lost in his debut to the Hotshots, he was able to play for 27 minutes. In his second game with the team, he had 16 points, six assists, three rebounds, and a steal coming off the bench as NLEX got its first win of the Commissioner's Cup over the Meralco Bolts. During the Governors' Cup, he hit a go-ahead three with 20 seconds left in overtime as NLEX completed a comeback from 28 points down to beat Barangay Ginebra. A month later, he made a game-winning putback over the Hotshots, similar to his putback against Alaska five years ago. However, they lost in the quarterfinals to NorthPort.

In the offseason, on December 16, 2019, Cruz was signed to a two-year maximum deal worth ₱10 million. During the 2020 Philippine Cup, Cruz sprained his ankle. He came back a week after the injury against NorthPort. He then made five three-pointers in a win over his former team TNT. NLEX just barely missed the playoffs that conference.

On December 31, 2021, he became an unrestricted free agent, but he eventually re-signed a two-month deal with NLEX on January 20, 2022.

=== San Miguel Beermen (2022–present) ===
On March 1, 2022, he became an unrestricted free agent again after not re-signing with NLEX. He immediately signed a three-year contract with the San Miguel Beermen on the same day. He declined offers from two teams of the Japanese B.League preferring to stay with his family in the Philippines. Signing with San Miguel also reunited him with college coach Leo Austria and college teammate Rodney Brondial, who had also signed with the team in free agency. Four months thereafter, Cruz set his career-high 30 points in SMB's tough win over TNT. He then missed two games due to health protocols. In Game 5 of the 2022 Philippine Cup semis, he contributed 17 points as SMB took a 3–2 lead in the best-of-seven series against Meralco. SMB then won the next game to enter the finals. Cruz and SMB were able to win the title in seven games over his former team TNT. For the 2022–23 season, Cruz averaged 11.3 points and won the Mr. Quality Minutes award.

During the 2023–24 Commissioner's Cup, Cruz accumulated five technical fouls throughout the conference, which led to him being suspended for Game 3 of the finals against the Hotshots. Down 2–1, he returned in Game 4 and in Game 5 tied his career-high of 30 points on eight triples to give SMB a 3–2 lead. SMB then won Game 6 for his second championship with the franchise, and third overall. To begin the 2024 Philippine Cup, Cruz led the team with 20 points in a win over Rain or Shine. From there, they won 10 straight before a loss to Meralco prevented them from sweeping the elimination round. SMB made it to the finals that conference, but lost to Meralco 4–2.

On February 7, 2025, Cruz signed a two-year extension to stay with SMB. He missed a game during the 2025 Philippine Cup due to conjunctivitis. As the first seed that conference, SMB reached the semifinals against Ginebra. In Game 5, he scored a season-high 27 points on 9-of-12 shooting from the field off the bench to give SMB a 3–2 series lead. Ginebra won Game 6 off a LA Tenorio buzzer-beater he failed to defend, but SMB were able to close out the series in Game 7 to enter the finals. In the finals, they faced TNT, who were going for a grand slam. In Game 2, he had seven assists as SMB tied the series. He then had 23 points in Game 4 and 20 points in Game 5. SMB then won Game 6 to deny TNT the grand slam. For the series, he averaged 13.8 points, 3,5 rebounds and 3.3 assists and won his first-ever Finals MVP and fourth PBA title overall.

== PBA career statistics ==
Legend
GP	Games played	MPG	Minutes per game	FG%	Field-goal percentage
3FG%	3-point field-goal percentage	4P%	4-point field-goal percentage	FT%	Free-throw percentage
RPG	Rebounds per game	APG	Assists per game	SPG	Steals per game
BPG	Blocks per game	PPG	Points per game	127	Career high

As of the end of 2025–26 season

=== Season-by-season averages ===
Year	Team	GP	MPG	FG%	3P%	4P%	FT%	RPG	APG	SPG	BPG	PPG
2014–15	Rain or Shine	40	17.0	.421	.237	—	.861	2.4	1.4	.7	.0	6.6
2015–16	Rain or Shine	53	24.4	.483	.367	—	.748	3.2	2.1	.8	.1	12.5
2016–17	Rain or Shine	38	23.8	.396	.306	—	.735	4.5	2.4	1.0	.1	9.8
2017–18	Rain or Shine	27	20.7	.415	.355	—	.710	2.9	2.8	1.3	.1	8.0
2017–18	TNT	27	20.7	.415	.355	—	.710	2.9	2.8	1.3	.1	8.0
2019	TNT	25	23.3	.372	.270	—	.719	3.8	3.4	.9	—	9.4
2019	NLEX	25	23.3	.372	.270	—	.719	3.8	3.4	.9	—	9.4
2020	NLEX	10	25.9	.516	.383	—	.696	2.5	3.8	1.3	.2	13.2
2021	NLEX	26	24.6	.432	.256	—	.698	3.3	3.0	1.3	.1	9.5
2021	San Miguel	26	24.6	.432	.256	—	.698	3.3	3.0	1.3	.1	9.5
2022–23	San Miguel	56	24.8	.440	.322	—	.718	2.6	2.6	.8	.1	11.3
2023–24	San Miguel	39	24.9	.424	.313	—	.760	2.8	1.9	.7	.1	10.6
2024–25	San Miguel	56	21.0	.399	.286	.208	.816	2.6	2.3	.5	.0	8.1
2025–26	San Miguel	49	21.7	.427	.320	.167	.746	2.4	2.5	.8	.0	9.1
Career		419	22.8	.429	.313	.188	.756	3.0	2.4	.8	.1	9.7

== National team career ==
Cruz was a part of the Philippines team that won the gold medal at the 2013 Southeast Asian Games basketball tournament in Naypyidaw, Myanmar.

He has also represented the Northern Mariana Islands at the youth level, playing in the 2008 FIBA Oceania Youth Tournament leading CNMI to a sixth-place finish and in the process, was voted as one of the tournament's Top 5 players. At the 2010 Micronesian Games, Cruz played for the Guam national team and won a gold medal. In January 2020, Cruz received a call-up to play for Guam at the 2022 FIBA Asia Cup qualifiers. He helped lead Guam to its first-ever appearance at the FIBA Asia Cup in 2025.

== Personal life ==
Cruz is married to Mossah "Mosh" Carlos. They have three children. He owned a gym where Kenneth Llover used to train.
