= 2025 PBA Philippine Cup finals =

2025 edition of the PBA Philippine Cup finals

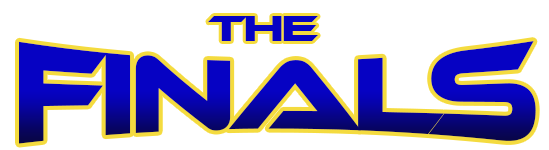
Team	Coach	Wins
(1) San Miguel Beermen	Leo Austria	4
(6) TNT Tropang 5G	Chot Reyes	2
- Dates: July 13 – 25, 2025
- MVP: Jericho Cruz
- Television: Local: RPTV; PBA Rush (HD); International: Pilipinas Live; Online: Pilipinas Live
- Announcers: see Broadcast notes

Referees
- Game 1: Rommel Gruta, Mardy Montoya, Jerry Narandan, James Paez
- Game 2: Nol Quilinguen, Bing Oliva, Mike Flordeliza, Janine Nicandro
- Game 3: Nol Quilinguen, Rommel Gruta, Jerry Narandan, James Paez
- Game 4: Nol Quilinguen, Bing Oliva, Mardy Montoya, Janine Nicandro
- Game 5: Peter Balao, Mike Flordeliza, Jerry Narandan, James Paez
- Game 6: Nol Quilinguen, Peter Balao, Mike Flordeliza, James Paez

PBA Philippine Cup finals chronology
- < 2024 2025–26 Philippine >

PBA finals chronology
- < 2024–25 Commissioner's 2025–26 Philippine >

The 2025 PBA Philippine Cup finals was the championship series of the 2025 PBA Philippine Cup and the conclusion of the conference's playoffs. It was the third and last championship tournament of the Philippine Basketball Association (PBA)'s 2024–25 season. The best-of-seven series was contested between the San Miguel Beermen and the TNT Tropang 5G. The series began on July 13 and ended on July 25 that marked the end of the conference and the 2024–25 PBA season.

The San Miguel Beermen and the TNT Tropang 5G competed for the 46th Philippine Cup championship and the 138th overall championship contested by the league. San Miguel won the series in six games, giving them a record-extending 30th PBA title and their 11th Philippine Cup title. The Beermen also ended TNT's attempt at accomplishing the league's first Grand Slam since the 2013–14 season when the San Mig Super Coffee Mixers (now known as the Magnolia Chicken Timplados Hotshots) accomplished it.

== Background ==
=== General ===
This is be the first Finals meeting between San Miguel and TNT since the 2022 Philippine Cup, where San Miguel won in seven games.

San Miguel entered the Finals after losing the previous year's Philippine Cup finals to the Meralco Bolts. Under the helm of returning head coach Leo Austria, the Beermen have been undefeated in the Philippine Cup finals, having won in 2014–15, 2015–16, 2016–17, 2017–18, 2019, and 2022. However, they had only lost a Finals series once, to the Barangay Ginebra San Miguel in the 2018 Commissioner's Cup.

Meanwhile, TNT entered the Finals with ambitions of becoming the first team since the San Mig Super Coffee Mixers (now Magnolia Chicken Timplados Hotshots) in 2013–14 to win the Grand Slam. The last time they entered the Finals with an opportunity to accomplish the feat was in the 2011 Governors' Cup, where they were defeated by San Miguel (then as the Petron Blaze Boosters) in seven games. Austria said of the San Miguel Beermen, who entered the Finals after missing the playoffs of the 2024–25 Commissioner's Cup: "We're here not to stop [TNT's] ambition [for the Grand Slam] but we're here to win games and eventually win the championship."

=== Road to the finals ===
San Miguel Beermen		TNT Tropang 5G
Finished 8–3 (.727), tied for 1st place with NLEX, Magnolia, and Barangay Ginebra	Elimination round	Finished 6–5 (.545), tied for 6th place with Rain or Shine and Meralco
Head-to-head quotient: San Miguel 1.06, NLEX 1.01, Magnolia 0.97, Barangay Ginebra 0.96 (ranked 1st)	Tiebreaker	Head-to-head quotient: TNT 1.13, Rain or Shine 1.02, Meralco 0.87 (ranked 6th)
Def. Meralco, 108–97	Quarterfinals	Def. Magnolia in two games (twice-to-beat advantage)
Def. Barangay Ginebra, 4–3	Semifinals	Def. Rain or Shine, 4–2

=== Head-to-head matchup ===
RPTV

May 4
7:30 pm

Box score

San Miguel Beermen 84, TNT Tropang 5G 89
Scoring by quarter: 26–26, 13–18, 23–27, 22–18
Pts: Perez 26; Rebs: Fajardo 14; Asts: Brondial, Perez 5	Pts: Oftana 23; Rebs: Oftana 21; Asts: Oftana 6

Ynares Center, Antipolo, Rizal
Referees: Nol Quilinguen, Rommel Gruta, Bryan Peclaro, Kenny Hallig

== Series summary ==
Game	Date	Venue	Winner	Result
Game 1	July 13	Smart Araneta Coliseum	TNT	99–96
Game 2	July 16	Smart Araneta Coliseum	San Miguel	98–92
Game 3	July 18	Smart Araneta Coliseum	San Miguel	108–88
Game 4	July 20	SM Mall of Asia Arena	San Miguel	105–91
Game 5	July 23	Smart Araneta Coliseum	TNT	86–78
Game 6	July 25	PhilSports Arena	San Miguel	107–96

== Game summaries ==
=== Game 1 ===
RPTV

July 13
7:30 pm

Box score

San Miguel Beermen 96, TNT Tropang 5G 99
Scoring by quarter: 22–28, 19–33, 25–24, 30–14
Pts: Fajardo 26; Rebs: Fajardo 15; Asts: Ross 4	Pts: Pogoy 23; Rebs: Oftana 9 Asts: Heading 6
TNT leads series, 1–0

Smart Araneta Coliseum, Quezon City
Referees: Rommel Gruta, Mardy Montoya, Jerry Narandan, James Paez

With less than a minute remaining in the 4th quarter, San Miguel Beermen center Moala Tautuaa scored on a dunk to take a 98–97 lead for the Beermen. However, moments later, it was ruled as an offensive interference after a review by the referees.

Before this controversial call, The Beermen were down by as much as 21 points and came back.

=== Game 2 ===
RPTV

July 16
7:30 pm

Box score

San Miguel Beermen 98, TNT Tropang 5G 92
Scoring by quarter: 23–19, 28–20, 24–35, 23–18
Pts: Trollano 22; Rebs: Fajardo, Perez 9 Asts: Cruz, Ross 7	Pts: Oftana 23; Rebs: Williams 8 Asts: Erram, Williams 3
Series tied, 1–1

Smart Araneta Coliseum, Quezon City
Referees: Nol Quilinguen, Bing Oliva, Mike Flordeliza, Janine Nicandro

San Miguel takes the 51–39 lead at halftime. TNT nearly made a comeback as they cut the lead to 1 at the end of the 3rd quarter. In the end, the Beermen hold on the lead, winning by 6 points and tying the series.

=== Game 3 ===
RPTV

July 18
7:30 pm

Box score

San Miguel Beermen 108, TNT Tropang 5G 88
Scoring by quarter: 22–25, 37–27, 27–18, 22–18
Pts: Fajardo 33; Rebs: Fajardo 11; Asts: Cruz, Fajardo 3	Pts: Pogoy 16; Rebs: Oftana 9 Asts: Enciso, Heading 3
San Miguel leads series, 2–1

Smart Araneta Coliseum, Quezon City
Referees: Nol Quilinguen, Rommel Gruta, Jerry Narandan, James Paez

Game 3 began with TNT Tropang 5G leading 15–5. At the end of 1st quarter, the lead was cut down to 3 by the San Miguel Beermen, 25–22. After taking the lead in the second quarter, the Beermen expanded the lead in the second half by as much as 18 after the 18–5 run. Tropang 5G tried to come back as they cut Beermen's lead by 7 with 5 minutes remaining in the fourth quarter, but Chris Ross and the Beermen maintained the lead and won the game by 20.

=== Game 4 ===
RPTV

July 20
7:30 pm

Box score

San Miguel Beermen 105, TNT Tropang 5G 91
Scoring by quarter: 21–23, 24–14, 19–30, 41–24
Pts: Cruz 23; Rebs: Fajardo 12; Asts: Perez 5	Pts: Heading 23; Rebs: Khobuntin 10; Asts: Heading, Williams 5
San Miguel leads series, 3–1

SM Mall of Asia Arena, Pasay
Referees: Nol Quilinguen, Bing Oliva, Mardy Montoya, Janine Nicandro

Prior to the start of the game, San Miguel Beermen's June Mar Fajardo awarded his 12th Best Player of the Conference award, extending his record for most career BPC awards.

TNT Tropang 5G, once again, takes an early lead at the start of the game, leading 14–2. The lead didn't last long as CJ Perez hits a lay-up to take the first lead of San Miguel Beermen in the second quarter. As the game progresses, the Beermen expanded their lead, but Tropang 5G closed the lead as it goes back-and-forth at the start of the fourth quarter. In the end, the Beermen retook the lead and eventually winning the game. Tropang 5G coach Chot Reyes left the court with 9.4 seconds left in the fourth quarter. With Beermen's win, they have a chance to win the Philippine Cup championship and denying Tropang 5G's Grand Slam.

=== Game 5 ===
RPTV

July 23
7:30 pm

Box score

San Miguel Beermen 78, TNT Tropang 5G 86
Scoring by quarter: 20–27, 11–14, 22–18, 25–27
Pts: Cruz 20; Rebs: Fajardo 13; Asts: Perez 5	Pts: Ganuelas-Rosser 18; Rebs: Oftana, Williams 7 Asts: Heading, Oftana 5
San Miguel leads series, 3–2

Smart Araneta Coliseum, Quezon City
Referees: Peter Balao, Mike Flordeliza, Jerry Narandan, James Paez

With the Philippine Cup title and Grand Slam bid on the line, TNT Tropang 5G dominated most of the game beginning on Calvin Oftana's 5–0 run to take the lead for the rest of the game. San Miguel Beermen, on the other hand, only led for four times, all of which are in the first quarter. The Tropang 5G forces Game 6, still with the Grand Slam bid on the line.

=== Game 6 ===
RPTV

July 25
7:30 pm

Box score

San Miguel Beermen 107, TNT Tropang 5G 96
Scoring by quarter: 23–25, 29–22, 34–20, 21–29
Pts: Fajardo, Perez 24; Rebs: Fajardo 12; Asts: Cruz, Perez 6	Pts: Oftana 19; Rebs: Oftana, Williams 4 Asts: three players 4
San Miguel wins series, 4–2

PhilSports Arena, Pasig
Referees: Nol Quilinguen, Peter Balao, Mike Flordeliza, James Paez

By winning the game and the series, the San Miguel Beermen denied TNT Tropang 5G's Grand Slam bid for the second time. This is also the same team that denied TNT's Grand Slam in 2010–11, when at that time was the Petron Blaze Boosters won the title against Talk 'N Text Tropang Texters in the 2011 Governors' Cup. Jericho Cruz was named Finals MVP.

== Rosters ==
San Miguel Beermen roster
Players
Coaches

Pos.	#	POB	Name	Height	Weight	DOB (YYYY–MM–DD)	From
G	1	(United States)	Kris Rosales	6 ft 0 in (1.83 m)	165 lb (75 kg)	1990–12–20	Hope International
F	2	(Philippines)	Don Trollano	6 ft 3 in (1.91 m)	182 lb (83 kg)	1992–01–07	Adamson
F/C	3	(United States)	Moala Tautuaa	6 ft 8 in (2.03 m)	245 lb (111 kg)	1989–04–30	Chadron State
G	6	(United States)	Chris Ross	6 ft 1 in (1.85 m)	180 lb (82 kg)	1985–03–09	Marshall
F	11	(Sweden)	Andreas Cahilig	6 ft 5 in (1.96 m)		1991–01–22	EARIST
G/F	13	(United States)	Marcio Lassiter	6 ft 2 in (1.88 m)	185 lb (84 kg)	1987–05–16	Cal State Fullerton
C	15	(Philippines)	June Mar Fajardo	6 ft 10 in (2.08 m)	268 lb (122 kg)	1989–11–17	Cebu
G/F	21	(Philippines)	Jeron Teng	6 ft 2 in (1.88 m)	185 lb (84 kg)	1994–03–21	De La Salle
C	22	(Philippines)	JM Calma	6 ft 6 in (1.98 m)	193 lb (88 kg)	1997–12–02	San Sebastian
G	33	(Philippines)	Juami Tiongson	5 ft 10 in (1.78 m)	175 lb (79 kg)	1991–02–05	Ateneo
G	39	(Philippines)	Jericho Cruz	6 ft 1 in (1.85 m)	190 lb (86 kg)	1990–10–11	Adamson
G/F	77	(Hong Kong)	CJ Perez (C)	6 ft 2 in (1.88 m)	185 lb (84 kg)	1993–11–17	Lyceum
F	91	(Philippines)	Rodney Brondial	6 ft 5 in (1.96 m)	210 lb (95 kg)	1990–11–20	Adamson

Head coach

- (Philippines) Leo Austria

Assistant coach(es)

- (Philippines) Peter Martin (1st assistant)
- (Philippines) Ato Agustin
- (Philippines) Dayong Mendoza
- (Philippines) Biboy Ravanes
- (United States) Chris Ross
- (Philippines) Boyzie Zamar
- (Philippines) Jorge Gallent (consultant)

Team manager

- (Philippines) Gee Abanilla
- (Philippines) Daniel Henares (assistant)

Legend

- (C) Team captain
- (CI) Commissioner's Cup Import
- (GI) Governors' Cup Import
- (EI) EASL Import
- (DP) Unsigned draft pick
- (FA) Free agent
- (IN) Inactive
- (S) Suspended
- (R) Rookie
- Injured

Roster

TNT Tropang 5G roster
Players
Coaches

Pos.	#	POB	Name	Height	Weight	DOB (YYYY–MM–DD)	From
F/C	0	(Philippines)	Barkley Eboña	6 ft 6 in (1.98 m)	194 lb (88 kg)	1996–11–29	Far Eastern
G	1	(United States)	Simon Enciso	5 ft 11 in (1.80 m)	185 lb (84 kg)	1991–02–12	Notre Dame de Namur
G	6	(Philippines)	Rey Nambatac (injured)	5 ft 11 in (1.80 m)		1994–01–27	Letran
C	7	(Philippines)	Poy Erram	6 ft 8 in (2.03 m)	227 lb (103 kg)	1989–07–07	Ateneo
F	8	(Philippines)	Calvin Oftana	6 ft 5 in (1.96 m)	196 lb (89 kg)	1996–01–03	San Beda
F	9	(United States)	Paul Varilla	6 ft 3 in (1.91 m)		1993–08–10	UE
F	12	(Philippines)	Glenn Khobuntin	6 ft 4 in (1.93 m)	195 lb (88 kg)	1991–09–07	National-U
G	13	(Philippines)	Brian Heruela	5 ft 10 in (1.78 m)	195 lb (88 kg)	1989–04–13	Cebu
F	14	(Philippines)	Mike Nieto	6 ft 2 in (1.88 m)	200 lb (91 kg)	1997–05–31	Ateneo
G	15	(Australia)	Jordan Heading (R)	6 ft 2 in (1.88 m)	189 lb (86 kg)	1996–01–30	Cal Baptist
G/F	16	(Philippines)	Roger Pogoy (C)	6 ft 2 in (1.88 m)	180 lb (82 kg)	1992–06–16	Far Eastern
G	17	(Philippines)	Jayson Castro (injured) (FA)	5 ft 10 in (1.78 m)	185 lb (84 kg)	1986–06–30	Philippine Christian
F/C	21	(United States)	Kelly Williams	6 ft 6 in (1.98 m)	215 lb (98 kg)	1982–02–07	Oakland
G	26	(Philippines)	Almond Vosotros	5 ft 10 in (1.78 m)	170 lb (77 kg)	1990–01–26	De La Salle
F/C	32	(United States)	Henry Galinato	6 ft 6 in (1.98 m)	245 lb (111 kg)	1997-09-09	Philippines
G/F	35	(Philippines)	Kim Aurin	6 ft 1 in (1.85 m)	190 lb (86 kg)		UPHSD
F/C	45	(United States)	Brandon Ganuelas-Rosser	6 ft 6 in (1.98 m)	220 lb (100 kg)	1994–06–29	UC Riverside
F	50	(United States)	CJ Payawal (R / FA)	6 ft 5 in (1.96 m)	190 lb (86 kg)	1997–06–02	UE
G	53	(Philippines)	Chris Exciminiano (FA)	6 ft 0 in (1.83 m)	185 lb (84 kg)	1988–11–17	Far Eastern
G	99	(Philippines)	Jielo Razon (injured) (R)	5 ft 11 in (1.80 m)			UPHSD

Head coach

- (Philippines) Chot Reyes

Assistant coach(es)

- (Philippines) Josh Reyes (1st assistant)
- (Philippines) Sandy Arespacochaga
- (Philippines) Ranidel de Ocampo
- (Philippines) Yuri Escueta
- (Philippines) Bong Ravena

Team manager

- (Philippines) Jojo Lastimosa
- (Philippines) Yvette Ruiz (assistant)

Legend

- (C) Team captain
- (CI) Commissioner's Cup Import
- (GI) Governors' Cup Import
- (EI) EASL Import
- (DP) Unsigned draft pick
- (FA) Free agent
- (IN) Inactive
- (S) Suspended
- (R) Rookie
- Injured

Roster

== Broadcast notes ==
The Philippine Cup Finals aired on RPTV with simulcast on PBA Rush and Pilipinas Live (both in standard and high definition).

The PBA Rush broadcast provided the English language coverage of the Finals.

The Pilipinas Live also provided the English-Filipino language coverage of the Finals.

Game	RPTV			PBA Rush			Arena Plus Xs and Os
Game	Play-by-play	Analyst(s)	Courtside reporters	Play-by-play	Analyst	Courtside reporters	Hosts
Game 1	Sev Sarmenta	Quinito Henson and Dominic Uy	Eileen Shi	Carlo Pamintuan	Mark Molina	Bea Escudero	Anton Roxas and Allan Gregorio
Game 2	Magoo Marjon	Andy Jao and Richard del Rosario	Apple David	Paolo Del Rosario	Norman Black	Bea Escudero	Anton Roxas, Ronnie Magsanoc and Nico Salva
Game 3	Charlie Cuna	Quinito Henson and Jong Uichico	Eileen Shi	Andre Co	Andy Jao	Bea Escudero	Anton Roxas, Ronnie Magsanoc and Nico Salva
Game 4	Magoo Marjon	Jolly Escobar and Jeffrey Cariaso	Apple David	Anthony Suntay	Vince Hizon	Pauline Verzosa	Jinno Rufino and Allan Gregorio
Game 5	Sev Sarmenta	Quinito Henson and Andy Jao	Eileen Shi	Carlo Pamintuan	Dominic Uy	Bea Escudero	Anton Roxas, Ryan Gregorio and Nico Salva
Game 6	Charlie Cuna	Dominic Uy and Luigi Trillo	Eileen Shi	Paolo Del Rosario	Eric Reyes	Bea Escudero	Anton Roxas, Ryan Gregorio and Ronnie Magsanoc

- Additional crew:
  - Trophy presentation: Jutt Sulit
  - Celebration interviewer: Eileen Shi and Bea Escudero
