= PBA Mr. Quality Minutes award =

Philippine Basketball Association award

The Philippine Basketball Association (PBA) Mr. Quality Minutes is an annual Philippine Basketball Association (PBA) award given since the 1993 PBA season to the league's best performing player for his team coming off the bench as a substitute (or sixth man). Unlike the traditional player awards, which is given by the league, this citation is awarded by the PBA Press Corps.

Since its inception, the award has been given to 25 individuals.

== Winners ==
^	Denotes player who is still active in the PBA
*	Inducted into the PBA Hall of Fame
Player (X)	Denotes the number of times the player has received the award
Team (X)	Denotes the number of times a player from this team has won

Season	Player	Position	Country of birth	Team	Ref.
1993	Olsen Racela	Point guard	Philippines	Purefoods Tender Juicy Hotdogs	
1994	Merwin Castelo	Shooting guard	Philippines	Alaska Milkmen	
1995	Jun Marzan	Shooting guard / Small forward	Philippines	Formula Shell Zoom Masters	
1996	Jun Reyes	Point guard	Philippines	Alaska Milkmen (2)	
1997	Paul Alvarez	Shooting guard / Small forward	Philippines	San Miguel Beermen	
1998	Rodney Santos	Shooting guard / Small forward	Philippines	Alaska Milkmen (3)	
1999	Rodney Santos (2)	Shooting guard / Small forward	Philippines	Alaska Milkmen (4)	
2000	Boybits Victoria	Point guard	Philippines	San Miguel Beermen (2)	
2001	Mark Caguioa	Shooting guard	Philippines	Barangay Ginebra Kings	
2002	Ato Morano	Point guard / Shooting guard	Philippines	Coca-Cola Tigers	
2003	Renren Ritualo	Shooting guard	Philippines	FedEx Express	
2004–05	Ronald Tubid	Shooting guard / Small forward	Philippines	Shell Turbo Chargers (2)	
2005–06	Ronald Tubid (2)	Shooting guard / Small forward	Philippines	Air21 Express (2)	
2006–07	Chris Calaguio	Shooting guard	Philippines	San Miguel Beermen (3)	
2007–08	Peter June Simon	Shooting guard	Philippines	Purefoods Tender Juicy Giants (2)	
2008–09	Jayson Castro^	Point guard	Philippines	Talk 'N Text Tropang Texters	
2009–10	KG Canaleta	Small forward / Power forward	Philippines	B-Meg Derby Ace Llamados (3)	
2010–11	Jayson Castro^ (2)	Point guard	Philippines	Talk 'N Text Tropang Texters (2)	
2011–12	Larry Fonacier	Shooting guard / Small forward	Philippines	Talk 'N Text Tropang Texters (3)	
2012–13	Jervy Cruz	Power forward	Philippines	Rain or Shine Elasto Painters	
2013–14	Peter June Simon (2)	Shooting guard	Philippines	San Mig Super Coffee Mixers (4)	
2014–15	Calvin Abueva^	Small forward / Power forward	Philippines	Alaska Aces (5)	
2015–16	Jericho Cruz^	Shooting guard	Philippines	Rain or Shine Elasto Painters (2)	
2016–17	Jio Jalalon^	Point guard	Philippines	Star Hotshots (5)	
2017–18	Vic Manuel	Power forward	Philippines	Alaska Aces (6)	
2019	Terrence Romeo	Point guard / Shooting guard	Philippines	San Miguel Beermen (4)	
2020	RJ Jazul	Point guard / Shooting guard	Philippines	Phoenix Super LPG Fuel Masters	
2021	Allein Maliksi^	Small forward	Philippines	Meralco Bolts	
2022–23	Jericho Cruz^ (2)	Shooting guard	Philippines	San Miguel Beermen (5)	
2023–24	Bong Quinto^	Small forward	Philippines	Meralco Bolts (2)	
2024–25	Don Trollano^	Small forward	Philippines	San Miguel Beermen (6)	

== Multiple time winners ==
Total	Player
2	Jayson Castro
2	Jericho Cruz
2	Rodney Santos
2	Peter June Simon
2	Ronald Tubid
