= Philip Butel =

Filipino basketball player

Personal information
- Born: June 18, 1980 (age 46) Tuguegarao, Cagayan, Philippines
- Listed height: 6 ft 7 in (2.01 m)
- Listed weight: 205 lb (93 kg)

Career information
- College: UE
- PBA draft: 2007:
- Drafted by: Sta. Lucia Realtors
- Playing career: 2007–2008, 2018–2020
- Position: Center / power forward

Career history
- 2007–2008: Sta. Lucia Realtors
- 2018: Caloocan Supremos
- 2019–2020: Rizal Golden Coolers

Career highlights
- PBA champion (2007–08 Philippine)

Philip Peter B. Butel (born June 18, 1980) is a Filipino former basketball player. He was signed by Sta. Lucia in 2007 as a free agent.

== Player profile ==
Butel played three games in the 2007–08 PBA Philippine Cup, though he only scored 2 points. During the start of the 2009 PBA Fiesta Conference, he was waived by the Sta. Lucia Realtors.
