= 2007–08 PBA Philippine Cup =

- Duration: October 14, 2007 – March 2, 2008
- TV partner(s): ABC (Local); The Filipino Channel (International)

Finals
- Champions: Sta. Lucia Realtors
- Runners-up: Purefoods Tender Juicy Giants

Awards
- Best Player: Kelly Williams (Sta. Lucia Realtors)
- Finals MVP: Dennis Espino (Sta. Lucia Realtors)

PBA Philippine Cup chronology
- < 2006–07 2008–09 >

PBA conference chronology
- < 2007 Fiesta 2008 Fiesta >

The 2007–08 Philippine Basketball Association (PBA) Philippine Cup or known as the 2007–08 Smart PBA Philippine Cup for sponsorship reasons, was the first conference of the 2007–08 PBA season. The tournament was formally opened on October 14, 2007, and ended on March 2, 2008. The tournament is an All-Filipino format, which doesn't require an import or a pure-foreign player for each team.

The winner will receive the Jun Bernardino Trophy. The Sta. Lucia Realtors needed the maximum seven games to defeat the #1 seed Purefoods Tender Juicy Giants to win their first All-Filipino conference championship.

== Format ==
The following format will be observed for the duration of the conference:

- Double-round robin eliminations; 18 games per team; Teams are then seeded by basis on win–loss records. Ties are broken among points differences of the tied teams or by classification games.
- #10 team will be eliminated
- Teams seeded #6, #7, #8 and #9 play in a single-elimination tournament to determine the wildcard qualifier:
  - #6 vs. #9 teams
  - #7 vs. #8 teams
  - Winners of the first round meet each other to determine the wildcard winner
- #3, #4 and #5 teams automatically advance to the best-of-3 quarterfinals:
  - #3 team vs. winner of wildcard playoffs
  - #4 vs. #5 teams
- #1 and #2 teams automatically advance to the best-of-7 semifinals:
  - Winner of first quarterfinal vs. #1
  - Winner of second quarterfinal vs. #2
- The winners in the semifinals advance to the best-of-7 finals. The losers dispute the third-place trophy in a one-game playoff.

== Elimination round ==
=== Team standings ===
Pos	Team	W	L	PCT	GB	Qualification
1	Purefoods Tender Juicy Giants	12	6	.667 (Note: Head-to-head record: Purefoods 2–0 Sta. Lucia)	—	Advance to semifinals
2	Sta. Lucia Realtors	12	6	.667	—	Advance to semifinals
3	Alaska Aces	11	7	.611 (Note: Head-to-head record: Alaska 1–1 Red Bull (Alaska +29))	1	Advance to quarterfinals
4	Red Bull Barako	11	7	.611	1	Advance to quarterfinals
5	Magnolia Beverage Masters	10	8	.556	2	Advance to quarterfinals
6	Talk 'N Text Phone Pals	9	9	.500	3	Advance to wildcard round
7	Barangay Ginebra Kings	8	10	.444	4	Advance to wildcard round
8	Air21 Express	7	11	.389 (Note: Head-to-head record: Air21 2–0 Coca-Cola)	5	Advance to wildcard round
9	Coca-Cola Tigers	7	11	.389	5	Advance to wildcard round
10	Welcoat Dragons	3	15	.167	9	

=== Schedule ===
	Round 1									Round 2								
Team ╲ Game	1	2	3	4	5	6	7	8	9	10	11	12	13	14	15	16	17	18
Air21	MBM	ALA	RBB	Coke	SLR	PF	BGK	TNT	RBB	WEL	BGK	ALA	PF	TNT	Coke	MBM	WEL	SLR
Alaska	TNT	A21	Coke	BGK	WEL	MBM	RBB	PF	WEL	Coke	BGK	SLR	A21	SLR	MBM	RBB	TNT	PF
Barangay Ginebra	RBB	TNT	WEL	ALA	PF	SLR	A21	MBM	Coke	WEL	ALA	A21	SLR	MBM	Coke	PF	RBB	TNT
Coca-Cola	WEL	ALA	MBM	A21	PF	SLR	TNT	BGK	ALA	SLR	RBB	MBM	WEL	BGK	A21	PF	RBB	TNT
Magnolia	A21	SLR	PF	Coke	TNT	ALA	WEL	BGK	RBB	PF	TNT	RBB	Coke	BGK	ALA	A21	SLR	WEL
Purefoods	SLR	TNT	MBM	WEL	BGK	Coke	A21	RBB	ALA	SLR	MBM	TNT	WEL	A21	BGK	Coke	ALA	RBB
Red Bull	BGK	WEL	A21	SLR	TNT	ALA	PF	MBM	TNT	A21	Coke	MBM	SLR	WEL	ALA	BGK	Coke	PF
Sta. Lucia	PF	MBM	TNT	RBB	A21	BGK	Coke	WEL	PF	Coke	ALA	BGK	RBB	ALA	TNT	WEL	MBM	A21
Talk 'N Text	ALA	PF	BGK	SLR	MBM	RBB	WEL	Coke	A21	RBB	MBM	PF	WEL	A21	SLR	ALA	BGK	Coke
Welcoat	Coke	RBB	BGK	PF	ALA	TNT	MBM	SLR	ALA	BGK	A21	PF	TNT	Coke	RBB	SLR	A21	MBM

= Win; = OT win; = Loss; = OT loss

== Bracket ==
Wildcard phase (Single elimination)
6	Talk 'N Text	73
9	Coca-Cola	81
7	Brgy. Ginebra	110
8	Air21	119

Wildcard phase (Single elimination)
9	Coca-Cola	109
8	Air21	102

Quarterfinals (Best-of-3)
3	Alaska	2
9	Coca-Cola	0
4	Red Bull	2
5	Magnolia	0

Semifinals (Best-of-7)
3	Alaska	3
2	Sta. Lucia	4
1	Purefoods	4
4	Red Bull	3

Finals (Best-of-7)
2	Sta. Lucia	4
1	Purefoods	3
Third place
3	Alaska	104
4	Red Bull	125

== Wildcard phase ==
=== First round ===
ABC

January 18

Talk 'N Text Phone Pals 73, Coca-Cola Tigers 81

Cuneta Astrodome, Pasay

ABC

January 18

Barangay Ginebra Kings 110, Air21 Express 119

Cuneta Astrodome, Pasay

=== Second round ===
ABC

January 20

Air21 Express 102, Coca-Cola Tigers 109

Cuneta Astrodome, Pasay

Coca-Cola and Talk 'N Text met in the first wildcard round, with the two teams making a mid-season trade, with Asi Taulava going to the Tigers while Ali Peek and draft picks going to the Phone Pals. Coke, which had previously denied the Phone Pals of a playoff for the last quarterfinal berth by winning their last elimination round game 2 days earlier, started out strong; the Phone Pals failed to answer to the challenge as they were beaten by the #9 seeds.

Air21 on the other hand faced defending champions Barangay Ginebra Kings, which were decimated by injuries to Billy Mamaril, Mark Caguioa and personal commitments by Rudy Hatfield (Hatfield didn't return) early in the season caused several losses and they had to settle for a wildcard berth. Behind the shooting of team captain Wynne Arboleda, Air21 raced to an early lead. Ginebra cut down the deficit, but while Caguioa was on a fastbreak attempt, Niño Canaleta blocked his shot that virtually ended Ginebra's title defense.

On the final wildcard game, Arboleda wasn't able to sustain his shooting as Taulava and Mark Telan had career games to advance to the quarterfinals to face the Alaska Aces.

== Quarterfinals ==
=== (3) Alaska vs. (9) Coca-Cola ===
Elimination round games: Alaska won both games, 117-106 and 98-94.

ABC

January 23

Alaska Aces 89, Coca-Cola Tigers 82

Cuneta Astrodome, Pasay

ABC

January 25

Alaska Aces 110, Coca-Cola Tigers 100
Alaska wins series, 2–0

Cuneta Astrodome, Pasay

Alaska ended Coca-Cola's run as the worst-seeded wildcard winner as they were eliminated by the #3 seed. Reigning Most Valuable Player Willie Miller made short work of the Tigers backcourt as Joachim Thoss overran the potent Coke frontcourt by converting outside shots.

=== (4) Red Bull vs. (5) Magnolia ===
Elimination round games: Red Bull won both games, 94-88 and 107-95.

ABC

January 23

Red Bull Barako 107, Magnolia Beverage Masters 104

Cuneta Astrodome, Pasay

ABC

January 25

Red Bull Barako 112, Magnolia Beverage Masters 94
Red Bull wins series, 2–0

Cuneta Astrodome, Pasay

Magnolia and Red Bull renewed their playoffs rivalry with Red Bull forcing the upset, as Magnolia was rated as the top team during the preseason, with Red Bull being decimated by one-sided trades (ironically to Magnolia). Cyrus Baguio had a coming-out party as he scored a career-high 31 points to win Game 1 for the Bulls. Junthy Valenzuela outplayed former Red Bull players Lordy Tugade and Enrico Villanueva to sweep the Beverage Masters.

The Bulls now clinch their sixth consecutive semifinals appearance.

== Semifinals ==
=== (1) Purefoods vs. (4) Red Bull ===
Elimination round games: Red Bull won both games, 87-74 and 97-84.

ABC

January 27

Purefoods Tender Juicy Giants 103, Red Bull Barako 84

Cuneta Astrodome, Pasay

ABC

January 30

Purefoods Tender Juicy Giants 89, Red Bull Barako 93

Cuneta Astrodome, Pasay

ABC

February 1

Purefoods Tender Juicy Giants 99, Red Bull Barako 90

Cuneta Astrodome, Pasay

ABC

February 3

Purefoods Tender Juicy Giants 88, Red Bull Barako 97 (OT)

Cuneta Astrodome, Pasay

ABC

February 6

Purefoods Tender Juicy Giants 96, Red Bull Barako 95

Araneta Coliseum, Quezon City

ABC

February 8

Purefoods Tender Juicy Giants 97, Red Bull Barako 123

Araneta Coliseum, Quezon City

ABC

February 10

Purefoods Tender Juicy Giants 83, Red Bull Barako 71
Purefoods wins series, 4–3

Araneta Coliseum, Quezon City

Purefoods, owing to a couple of weeks' rest blew out Red Bull which had defeated last season's finalists in Game 1. However, Red Bull came back in Game 2 to put up a defensive stand in the fourth quarter to tie the series, 2-2. Team captain Junthy Valenzuela kept the Giants at bay when they were making a run in the final minutes, scoring 2 crucial baskets. Purefoods then did their own pull-away at Game 3, crashing the boards at will; Marc Pingris rebounded a career-high 19 boards.

With a 1-3 series deficit looming, Red Bull again kept a pace with Purefoods in Game 4; however James Yap injured his groin in the first quarter after scoring ten points and didn't return. Purefoods managed to hold-off Red Bull until Cyrus Baguio drove to the basket after a pick-and-roll for an unmolested lay-up to tie the game 86-all. Peter June Simon missed his baseline jumper as time ran out to force overtime. In the extra period, Red Bull made an 11-2 run care of three pointers from Celino Cruz and Francis Adriano to tie the series once again.

After the injury to Yap, Purefoods coach Ryan Gregorio announced prior to Game 5 that Yap would be day-to-day. However, Yap started on Game 5 and Purefoods raced to a 40-17 lead after the first quarter. Red Bull crept up the lead and eventually cut down the lead to two with a minute to go thanks to a trey from Mick Pennisi. In the ensuing possession, Pingris was fouled on the act of shooting; Pingris missed both of his freethrows to give Red Bull another chance. After the time out and with both teams in penalty, Valenzuela was fouled. Valenzuela converted the first but missed the second, which led to a Kerby Raymundo rebound that sealed the win for the Giants.

Needing to win twice in a row to enter the finals, Red Bull started Game 6 with a 20-1 blast that caught Purefoods flatfooted. The Bulls then cruised on, with Mike Hrabak and Pennisi shooting treys to tie the series for last time, at 3-all. However, Purefoods started out Game 7 strong but the Barakos answered every Giants run to keep pace; however, thanks to misses from the perimeter by Red Bull and Purefoods' transition defense, the Giants were able to clinch their league-leading 12th All-Filipino Cup finals appearance.

=== (2) Sta. Lucia vs. (3) Alaska ===
Elimination round games: Sta. Lucia won both games, 94-88 and 101-96.

ABC

January 27

Sta. Lucia Realtors 94, Alaska Aces 107

Cuneta Astrodome, Pasay

ABC

January 30

Sta. Lucia Realtors 86, Alaska Aces 77

Cuneta Astrodome, Pasay

ABC

February 1

Sta. Lucia Realtors 91, Alaska Aces 82

Cuneta Astrodome, Pasay

ABC

February 3

Sta. Lucia Realtors 80, Alaska Aces 93

Cuneta Astrodome, Pasay

ABC

February 6

Sta. Lucia Realtors 96, Alaska Aces 90

Araneta Coliseum, Quezon City

ABC

February 8

Sta. Lucia Realtors 87, Alaska Aces 106

Araneta Coliseum, Quezon City

ABC

February 10

Sta. Lucia Realtors 92, Alaska Aces 84
Sta. Lucia wins series, 4–3

Araneta Coliseum, Quezon City

Unlike Purefoods which capitalized their long rest, Sta. Lucia had a rusty Game 1 that led to an Alaska blowout. However, Sta. Lucia then had their own blowout game in Game 2 to tie the series. Kelly Williams' dunk at the end of Game 2 was criticized by Alaska coach Tim Cone as a "lack of class".

With her Cebuana mother watching, Williams had a 27-point explosion to pull the Realtors ahead, 2-1. Alaska then turned their offensive game going in Game 4 to tie the series with a 90-83 Game 4 win, leading by as much as 26 points in some stages before the Realtors staged a comeback to cut the lead to two points. Reigning MVP Willie Miller converted three-pointers when the Sta. Lucia came close as he matched Williams' Game 3 output of 27 points to lead all scorers.

The pattern of early blowouts then a furious comeback continued as Sta. Lucia held off Alaska to lead the series, 3-2. Veteran Paolo Mendoza relived his collegiate days as he scored 19 points mostly in the early going. John Ferriols and sophomore Aaron Aban then led another comeback by the Aces to cut down the lead to two. Alaska's Jeffrey Cariaso was ejected from the game after he was assessed with two technical fouls that led to a cold period between the two teams in the final 6 minutes. With the score unchanged, Willie Miller converted a three-point play to tie at 90-all but the Realtors then scored the last 5 points of the game to put them one step closer to their first All-Filipino conference finals stint.

Like Red Bull, Alaska blew out their Game 6, with Miller and Tony dela Cruz each scoring more 20 points with 4 others reaching double figures. However, like Red Bull, they were closed out by the #2 seeds as the Realtors pounded on the end game, with Dennis Miranda nailing the trey that put the game out reach.

The franchise qualifies for their first ever All-Filipino conference finals stint.

== Third place playoff ==
ABC

February 15

Alaska Aces 104, Red Bull Barako 125
Red Bull wins 3rd place trophy.

Araneta Coliseum, Quezon City

== Finals ==
ABC

February 15

Purefoods Tender Juicy Giants 97, Sta. Lucia Realtors 109

Araneta Coliseum, Quezon City

ABC

February 17

Purefoods Tender Juicy Giants 101, Sta. Lucia Realtors 112

Araneta Coliseum, Quezon City

ABC

February 20

Purefoods Tender Juicy Giants 118, Sta. Lucia Realtors 107

Araneta Coliseum, Quezon City

ABC

February 22

Purefoods Tender Juicy Giants 106, Sta. Lucia Realtors 98

Araneta Coliseum, Quezon City

ABC

February 24

Purefoods Tender Juicy Giants 76, Sta. Lucia Realtors 88

Araneta Coliseum, Quezon City

ABC

February 27

Purefoods Tender Juicy Giants 89, Sta. Lucia Realtors 81

Araneta Coliseum, Quezon City

ABC

March 2

Purefoods Tender Juicy Giants 88, Sta. Lucia Realtors 100
Sta. Lucia wins series, 4–3

Araneta Coliseum, Quezon City

== Broadcast notes ==
The Associated Broadcasting Company broadcast all of the games in Philippine TV. Their finals broadcasters are:

Game	Play-by-play	Analyst	Coach's Corner	Courtside reporters
Game 1	Ed Picson	Quinito Henson	Norman Black	Dominic Uy and Paolo Trillo
Game 2	Mico Halili	Jason Webb	Norman Black	Patricia Bermudez-Hizon
Game 3	Mico Halili	Rado Dimalibot	Norman Black	Dominic Uy and Paolo Trillo
Game 4	Ed Picson	Quinito Henson	Norman Black	Magoo Marjon and Patricia Bermudez-Hizon
Game 5	Ed Picson	Quinito Henson	Norman Black	Dominic Uy and Paolo Trillo
Game 6	Mico Halili	Jason Webb	Norman Black	Richard del Rosario, Dominic Uy, Eric Reyes, Paolo Trillo and Marga Vargas
Game 7	Richard del Rosario	Jason Webb	Norman Black	Dominic Uy, Eric Reyes and Marga Vargas

Furthermore, the ABS-CBN News Channel carried the finals live overseas. Sports Radio 918 carried the games live on AM radio.

Featured songs include "How Far We've Come" by Matchbox Twenty and "Shadow of the Day" by Linkin Park.

== Awards ==
- Finals Most Valuable Player: Dennis Espino (Sta. Lucia)
- Best Player of the Conference: Kelly Williams (Sta. Lucia)
- Players of the Week:
  - October 14–21: James Yap (Purefoods)
  - October 22–28: Junthy Valenzuela (Red Bull)
  - October 29 – November 4: Willie Miller (Alaska)
  - November 5–11: Froilan Baguion (Welcoat)
  - November 12–18: Lordy Tugade (Magnolia) and Nic Belasco (Welcoat)
  - November 19–25: James Yap (Purefoods, 2nd time) and Junthy Valenzuela (Red Bull, 2nd time)
  - November 26 – December 2: Jeffrey Cariaso (Alaska) and Asi Taulava (Coca-Cola)
  - December 3–9: Kelly Williams (Sta. Lucia)
  - December 10–16: Asi Taulava (Coca-Cola, 2nd time)
  - December 17–23: Ryan Reyes (Sta. Lucia; rookie)
  - December 24–30: Sunday Salvacion (Brgy. Ginebra)
  - December 31 – January 6: James Yap (Purefoods, 3rd time) and Kelly Williams (Sta. Lucia, 2nd time)
  - January 7–13: Nelbert Omolon (Sta. Lucia)
  - January 14–20: Asi Taulava (Coca-Cola, 3rd time) and Mark Telan (Coca-Cola)
  - January 21–27: Willie Miller (Alaska, 2nd time)
  - January 28 – February 3: Kelly Williams (Sta. Lucia, 3rd time) and Junthy Valenzuela (Red Bull, 3rd time)
  - February 4–10: James Yap (Purefoods, 4th time)

== Stats leaders ==
Category	Player	Team	Stat
Points per game	Willie Miller	Alaska Aces	23.1
Rebounds per game	Asi Taulava	Coca-Cola Tigers	14.7
Assists per game	Jayjay Helterbrand	Barangay Ginebra Kings	6.8
Steals per game	Dondon Hontiveros	Magnolia Beverage Masters	1.70
Blocks per game	Ali Peek	Talk 'N Text Phone Pals	1.71
Field goal percentage	Samigue Eman	Magnolia Beverage Masters	.609
Free throw percentage	Ren-Ren Ritualo	Talk 'N Text Phone Pals	.909
Three-point field goal percentage	Gec Chia	Air21 Express	.438
Turnovers per game	Mark Telan	Coca-Cola Tigers	3.8
