= Chris Ross (basketball) =

Filipino-American basketball player

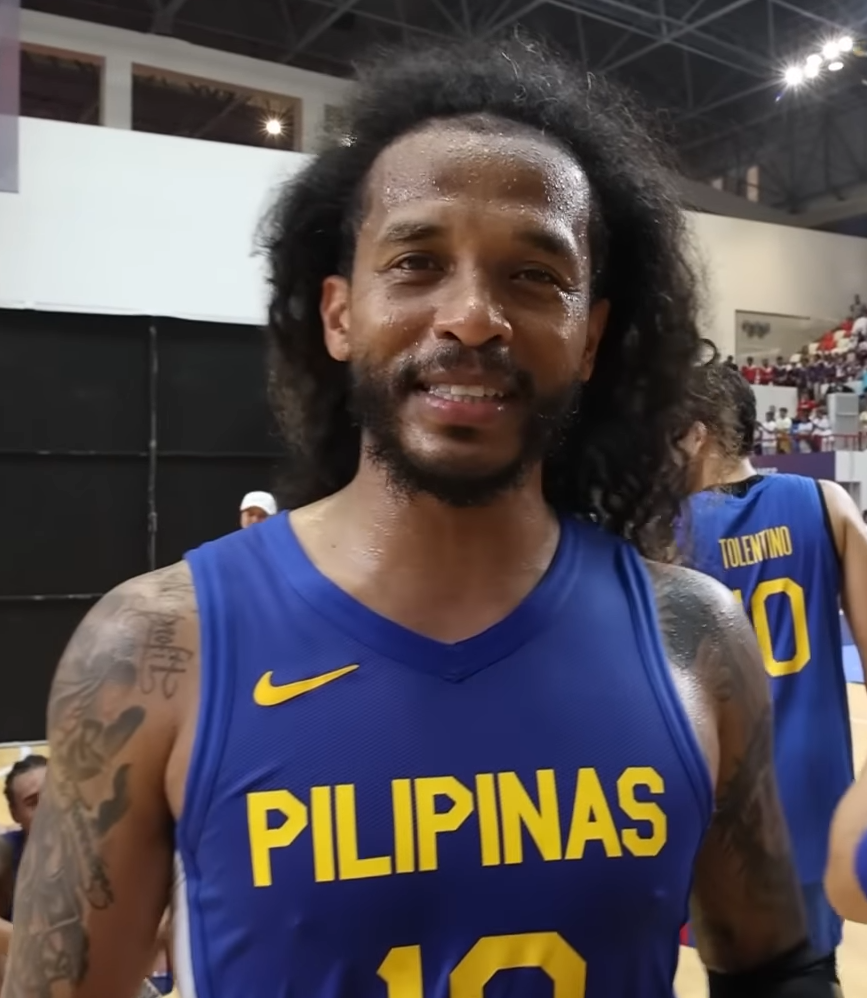
- Ross in 2023

No. 6 – San Miguel Beermen
- Position: Point guard / shooting guard / assistant coach
- League: PBA

Personal information
- Born: March 9, 1985 (age 41) San Antonio, Texas, U.S.
- Listed height: 6 ft 1 in (1.85 m)
- Listed weight: 180 lb (82 kg)

Career information
- High school: John Jay (San Antonio, Texas)
- College: Panola College (2003–2004); McLennan CC (2004–2005); Marshall (2005–2007)
- PBA draft: 2009: 1st round, 3rd overall pick
- Drafted by: Burger King Whoppers
- Playing career: 2009–present
- Coaching career: 2023–present

Career history

Playing
- 2009: Coca-Cola Tigers
- 2009–2010: Sta. Lucia Realtors
- 2010–2013: Meralco Bolts
- 2013–present: Petron Blaze Boosters / San Miguel Beermen

Coaching
- 2023–present: San Miguel Beermen (assistant)

Career highlights
- As player: 12× PBA champion (2014–15 Philippine, 2015 Governors', 2015–16 Philippine, 2016–17 Philippine, 2017 Commissioner's, 2017–18 Philippine, 2019 Philippine, 2019 Commissioner's, 2022 Philippine, 2023–24 Commissioner's, 2025 Philippine, 2025–26 Philippine); 2× PBA Finals MVP (2015–16 Philippine, 2016–17 Philippine); PBA Best Player of the Conference (2017 Commissioner's); 5× PBA All-Star (2012, 2016–2019); PBA Mythical First Team (2017); 2× PBA Defensive Player of the Year (2016, 2017); 7× PBA All-Defensive Team (2015–2021); PBA Most Improved Player (2017); PBL Most Valuable Player (2008-09 Season); PBL Best Player of the Conference (2009 PG Flex Unity Cup); PBL Mythical First Team (2008-09 Season); As assistant coach: 3× PBA champion (2023–24 Commissioner's, 2025 Philippine, 2025–26 Philippine)

Christopher Michael Ross (born March 9, 1985) is a Filipino-American professional basketball player for the San Miguel Beermen of the Philippine Basketball Association (PBA). He also serves as an assistant coach for the same team.

Ross played high school basketball at John Jay High School in San Antonio, Texas, where as a junior, he made a 50-foot, half-court buzzer-beater to win the 2002 Class 5A state basketball championship for Jay. After high school he played college basketball at McLennan Community College and Marshall University.

Ross can play both guard positions and is currently the starting point guard for the Beermen. In his tenure with the Beermen, he is known for his defensive skills, thus recognized as one of the best defenders in the league.

== Professional career ==
Ross was drafted by the Air21 Express back in 2009 as the third pick of the first-round.

=== Meralco Bolts ===
On June 6, 2012, with the Bolts, Ross recorded 18 points, 7 rebounds and 5 assists in an 83–88 loss to B-Meg Llamados. On July 8, 2012, Ross recorded 15 points and 5 assists in 31 minutes of playing time as a reserve in a losing effort to the Rain or Shine Elasto Painters. On July 15, 2012, Ross almost recorded a triple-double of 10 points, 10 rebounds and 8 assists in a win against his future the San Miguel Beermen.

On November 28, 2012, Ross recorded a double-double of 14 points and 10 assists in 34 minutes of playing time in an 85–88 loss to the Alaska Aces.

On February 16, 2013, against Rain or Shine, Ross almost recorded a triple-double after having racked up 6 points, 9 rebounds, 9 assists and 2 steals but in a losing effort. Eight days later, Ross recorded only 2 points but also his career-high in assists with 17 assists in a 90–89 win over the GlobalPort Batang Pier.

On March 15, 2013, with the Bolts, Ross recorded his first career triple-double having the statline of 10 points, 10 rebounds and 10 assists but in a losing effort to the San Mig Coffee Mixers, 71–76.

=== San Miguel Beermen ===
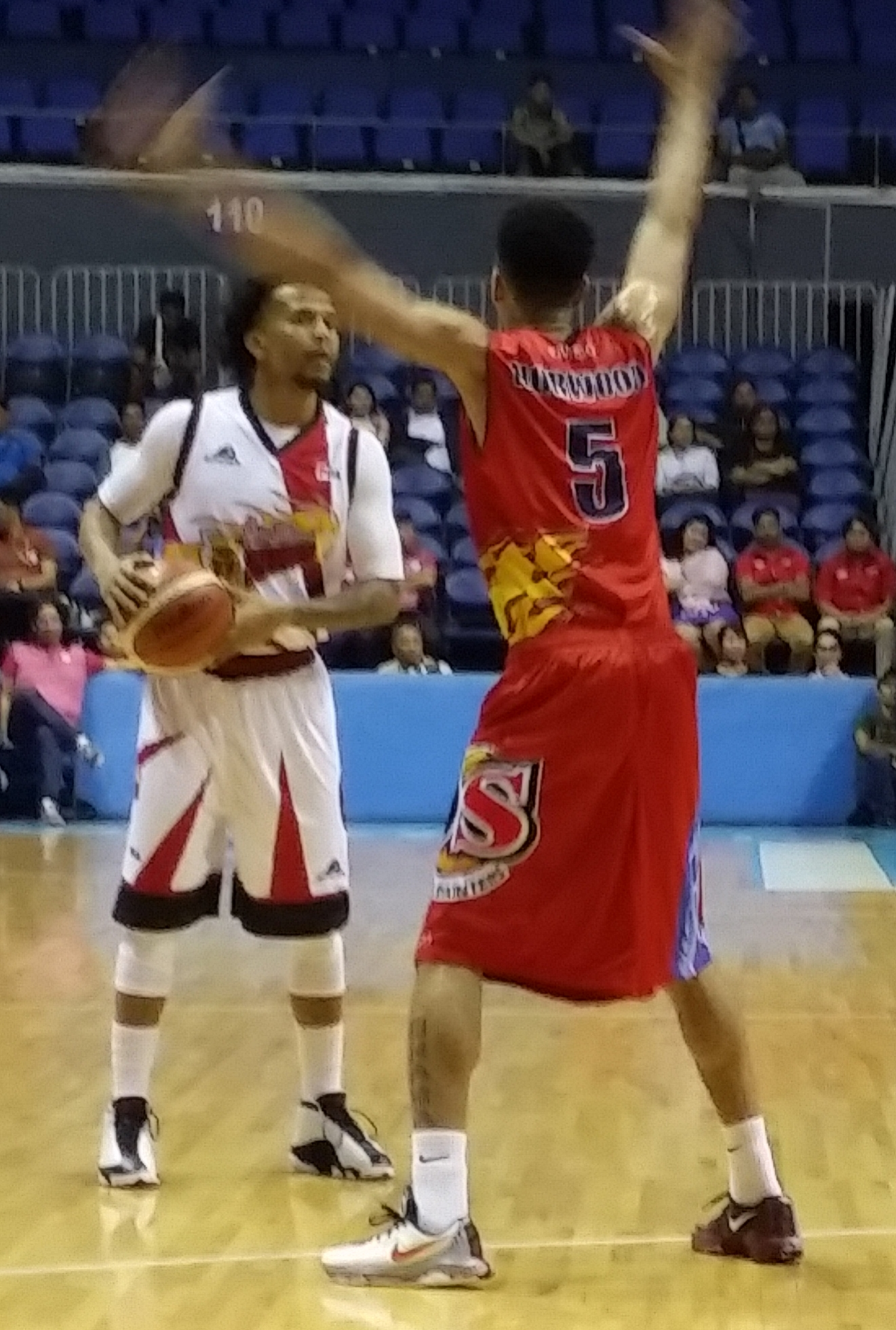
Ross with San Miguel. 2016.

==== 2013–14 Season ====
On October 30, 2013, Chris Ross was traded to the San Miguel Beermen in exchange for Denok Miranda.

On November 20, 2013, Ross debuted for the Beermen. He recorded only 3 points but had 5 rebounds, 6 assists and 3 steals in a win over the GlobalPort Batang Pier. In his third game with Beermen, Ross recorded 10 points, 5 rebounds and 6 assists in 26 minutes of playing time that resulted in a 90–88 win over the Air21 Express. The next game, Ross recorded 8 points, 4 rebounds, 6 assists and 4 steals for the Beermen as they won the game, 77–73, against his former team the Meralco Bolts. On January 18, 2014, in the last game of the 2013–14 Philippine Cup elimination, Ross contributed a conference-high 18 points to go along with 2 rebounds and a steal in a 96–87 win over the Meralco Bolts.

During the 2014 Philippine Cup Playoffs, Ross averaged 9 points, 2.5 rebounds per game, 3.5 assists per game in 17.5 minutes of playing time in a 2-game quarterfinals sweep against the Barako Bull Energy. However, they bowed down to the Rain Or Shine Elasto Painters in five games during the semifinals round. Ross recorded 8 points and 4 assists in their lone win in the series against the Elasto Painters.

In the first 3 games of the 2014 Commissioners' Cup, Ross averaged 4.3 points per game, 2.7 rebounds per game, 5.3 assists per game and 2.3 steals per game. However, the Beermen, in those 3 games has a record of 2–1. Their lone loss in that span came on March 14, 2014, against the TNT Katropa. On March 19, in a rematch against the Rain or Shine Elasto Painters, whom they lost in 5 games during the 2014 Philippine Cup playoffs, Ross recorded a season-high 22 points, 5 rebounds, 10 assists and 5 steals in 112–107 win for the Beermen. On May 25, Ross recorded a double-double of 12 points and 11 assists in a 109–92 win over the Northport Batang Pier.

==== 2014–15 Season ====
Ross recorded his first double-digit scoring output of the season after scoring 12 points to go along with 3 steals in a 79–76 win over the NLEX Road Warriors back on November 8, 2014. In Game 2 of the 2015 Philippine Cup Finals, Ross recorded his first double-digit scoring output in the finals after scoring 12 points and dished out 5 assists in a 100–86 win over the Alaska Aces.

== PBA career statistics ==
Legend
GP	Games played	MPG	Minutes per game	FG%	Field-goal percentage
3FG%	3-point field-goal percentage	4P%	4-point field-goal percentage	FT%	Free-throw percentage
RPG	Rebounds per game	APG	Assists per game	SPG	Steals per game
BPG	Blocks per game	PPG	Points per game	127	Career high

As of the end of 2025–26 season

=== Season-by-season ===
Year	Team	GP	MPG	FG%	3P%	4P%	FT%	RPG	APG	SPG	BPG	PPG
2009–10	Coca-Cola	37	16.9	.381	.095	—	.467	2.4	2.6	1.0	.2	4.5
2009–10	Sta. Lucia	37	16.9	.381	.095	—	.467	2.4	2.6	1.0	.2	4.5
2010–11	Meralco	25	32.5	.376	.000	—	.526	5.4	6.2	2.0	.3	8.0
2011–12	Meralco	29	29.3	.333	.180	—	.600	4.1	6.1	1.6	.3	6.5
2012–13	Meralco	42	28.6	.312	.145	—	.610	4.2	6.6	1.7	.2	5.2
2013–14	Petron / San Miguel	35	24.1	.381	.182	—	.714	3.4	5.1	1.9	—	7.8
2014–15	San Miguel	54	20.1	.435	.245	—	.679	2.9	2.7	1.4	.2	5.4
2015–16	San Miguel	57	26.1	.381	.206	—	.728	3.6	4.8	2.0	.3	6.5
2016–17	San Miguel	58	35.7	.421	.318	—	.696	5.0	7.2	2.8	.4	11.2
2017–18	San Miguel	57	31.6	.375	.306	—	.754	4.6	5.4	1.8	.1	8.3
2019	San Miguel	60	35.5	.392	.359	—	.707	5.0	5.4	2.2	.4	8.8
2020	San Miguel	13	30.5	.286	.256	—	.726	5.4	4.2	2.2	.3	7.4
2021	San Miguel	27	32.5	.355	.208	—	.744	4.6	5.1	2.0	.3	5.8
2022–23	San Miguel	48	20.8	.291	.214	—	.781	2.7	3.7	1.3	.1	3.2
2023–24	San Miguel	44	27.0	.328	.321	—	.655	2.9	3.6	1.4	.1	4.5
2024–25	San Miguel	54	17.7	.328	.330	.250	.800	2.4	2.4	.9	.2	3.5
2025–26	San Miguel	43	20.8	.240	.207	.188	.610	2.5	3.6	1.3	.2	3.3
Career		683	26.7	.364	.272	.232	.673	3.7	4.6	1.7	.2	6.3

== Awards and milestones ==
- January 21, 2015: Ross won his first PBA Championship after the San Miguel Beermen defeated the Alaska Aces in 7 games in the Philippine Cup Finals.
- February 3, 2016 — Ross was named Finals MVP after scoring a career high of 21 points with five rebounds, five assists, and shooting 4 for 6 from the 3-point line in game 7 of the 2016 Philippine Cup Finals.
- October 14, 2016 — Ross was recognized during the PBA Leo Awards Night and named to the PBA All-Defensive Team.
- February 10, 2017: Chris Ross became the 27th player in PBA history to reach 500 career steals.
- March 5, 2017: Chris Ross led the San Miguel Beermen towards a championship against their arch-rivals, the Barangay Ginebra San Miguel. They defeated them in five games. With the effort he does, Ross became the 2017 Philippine Cup PBA Finals MVP.
