= Dayong Mendoza =

Filipino basketball coach

San Miguel Beermen
- Position: Assistant coach/Team scout
- League: PBA

Career information
- College: University of the Philippines – Diliman
- Coaching career: 2002–present

Career history

Coaching
- 2002–2003: Cheeseball-Shark (assistant)
- 2004–2005: Shell Turbo Chargers (assistant)
- 2006–2007: Adamson HS
- 2005–2012: B-Meg Llamados (assistant/scout)
- 2014–present: San Miguel Beermen (assistant/scout)

Career highlights
- As assistant coach: 15× PBA champion (2006 Philippine, 2009–10 Philippine, 2012 Commissioner's, 2014–15 Philippine, 2015 Governors', 2015–16 Philippine, 2016–17 Philippine, 2017 Commissioner's, 2017–18 Philippine, 2019 Philippine, 2019 Commissioner's, 2022 Philippine, 2023–24 Commissioner's, 2025 Philippine, 2025–26 Philippine)

Dayong Mendoza (born Alfonso Mendoza, Jr. in June 2nd, 1972) is a Filipino professional basketball coach who serves as assistant coach and team scout of the San Miguel Beermen of the Philippine Basketball Association (PBA).

== Career ==
Mendoza started in 2002 at a PBL team (Cheeseball-Shark) as an assistant coach together with Atoy Co, with Philip Cezar as head coach.

He also served as an assistant coach for Shell Turbo Chargers under Leo Austria. He also served for Ateneo, Adamson, Letran and Shark Energy Drink.

After the disbandment of the Turbo Chargers, he was rumored to be an assistant for Coca-Cola Tigers under Binky Favis. But instead, he served as head coach of Adamson Baby Falcons.

From 2005, he served as an assistant coach and team scout for the B-Meg Llamados. He served with the team until 2012.

From 2014 until now, he served as team scout and assistant coach for San Miguel Beermen, and reunited with Austria.

In 2019, he launched a basketball camp called "Camp and Play".

== Outside basketball ==
Mendoza was known for having a colorful personality, and also for painting as he owns a coffee place in Quezon City called Dayong Art Gallery Café.

He has notable art exhibitions including: Basketbol Siris at Shangri-La Makati in 1996, was also sold out; Ugat, was sold out at the SM Megamall in 1999, and Dyip! Dyip! Dyip! in 2013 inside Serendra at the Global City Taguig.

== Personal life ==
Mendoza was previously married to María Sta. Maria Royeca, a native of General Santos. Together they have 3 sons: Alfonso, Marda and Migel. He is the son of Al Mendoza, a journalist.
