= Dominic Uy =

Filipino former basketball player, analyst and host

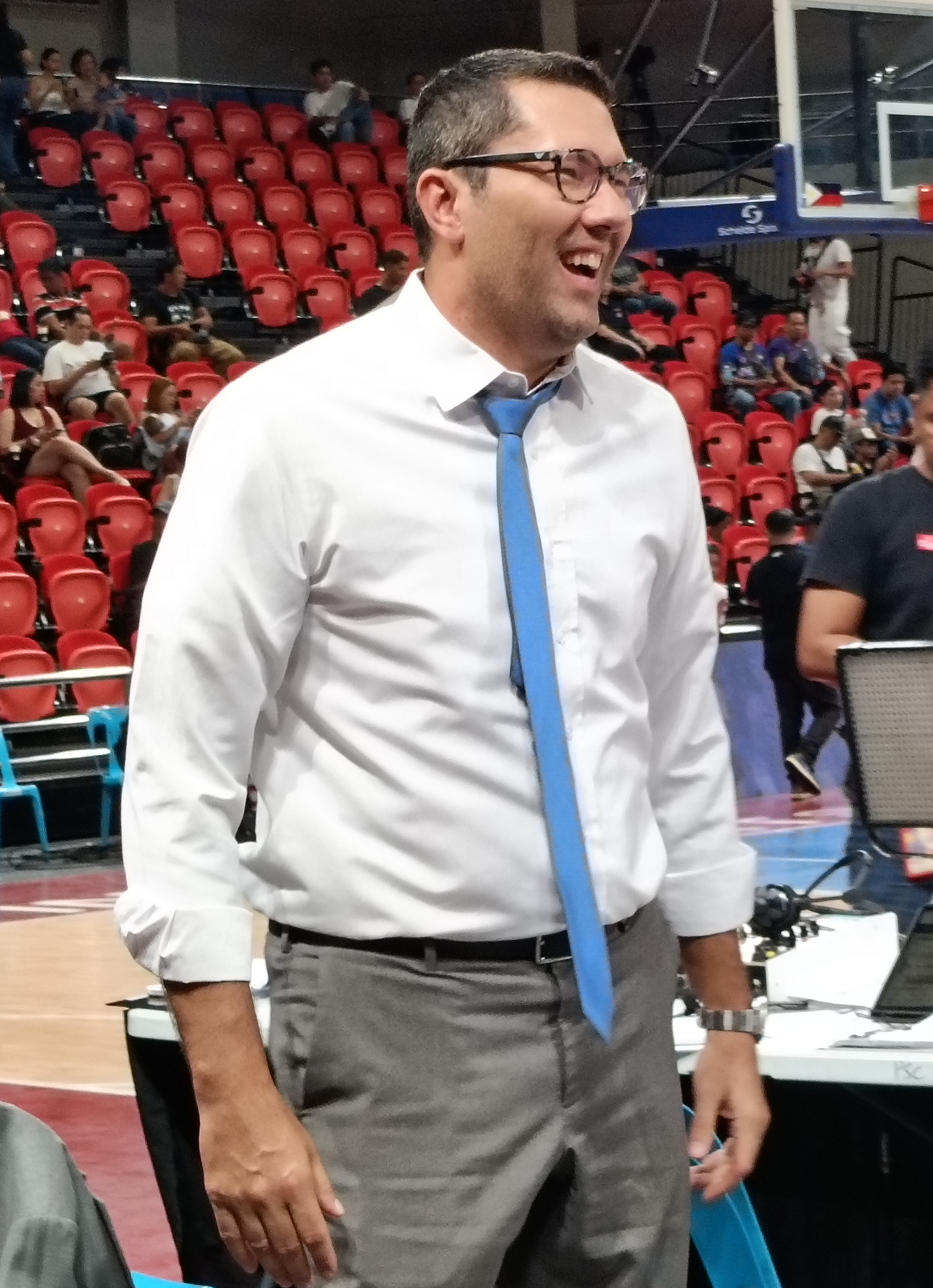
- Uy in 2025

Personal information
- Born: January 19, 1977 (age 49)
- Listed height: 6 ft 4 in (1.93 m)
- Listed weight: 205 lb (93 kg)

Career information
- College: De La Salle
- PBA draft: 2001: 4th round, 31st overall pick
- Drafted by: Tanduay Rhum Masters
- Position: Small forward / Power forward
- Number: 5, 11

Career history
- 1998–2000: Iloilo Megavoltz
- 2001–2004: Welcoat Paint Masters

Career highlights
- PBL champion (2002–03 Challenge Cup); UAAP champion (1998)

Dominic "Dom" Uy is a Filipino former basketball player, analyst, and TV host who served as a game analyst on PBA on One Sports.

== Playing career ==
=== La Salle ===
Uy played for De La Salle Green Archers under Jong Uichico (1994 to 1997), then under Franz Pumaren (1998). He won a championship in 1998 with Ren-ren Ritualo, Mon Jose, and future San Juan Mayor Francis Zamora.

=== Professional and PBL ===
Uy played for Iloilo Megavoltz in Metropolitan Basketball Association. After playing for Megavoltz, he applied to be drafted in 2001 PBA draft. He was selected in fourth round. His notable draftmates are Willie Miller, Mark Caguioa, Jojo Tangkay, Zamora, Topex Robinson, and Peter June Simon.

He later played for Welcoat Paint Masters in the PBL.

== Broadcasting career ==
=== Commentary ===
He worked on PBA coverages after playing in PBL. He started as a courtside reporter on his early years, but was an analyst later on. He also worked on UAAP analyst from 2001 to 2002.

=== Hosting ===
Uy formerly worked as a host in golfing tournaments.

== Personal life ==
He was a former racecar driver.

He played on NBA 3x Philippines Celebrity Division in 2013 with Jason Webb, Richard del Rosario, Mico Halili, TJ Manotoc, Marco Benitez and Charles Tiu.
