= 2011–12 Talk 'N Text Tropang Texters season =

- Head coach: Chot Reyes
- General manager: Aboy Castro
- Owners: Smart Communications (an MVP Group subsidiary)

Philippine Cup results
- Record: 19–8 (70.4%)
- Place: 2nd
- Playoff finish: Champions (def. Powerade, 4-1)

Commissioner's Cup results
- Record: 13–8 (61.9%)
- Place: 1st
- Playoff finish: Runner-up (lost to B-Meg, 4-3)

Governors Cup results
- Record: 8–6 (57.1%)
- Place: 4th
- Playoff finish: Semifinalist

Talk 'N Text Tropang Texters seasons

The 2011–12 Talk 'N Text Tropang Texters season was the 22nd season of the franchise in the Philippine Basketball Association (PBA).

== Key dates ==
- August 28: The 2011 PBA Draft took place in Robinson's Place Ermita, Manila.

== Draft picks ==
Round	Pick	Player	Position	Nationality	College
2	12	John Raymundo	Point guard	Philippines	San Sebastian

== Roster ==
2011–12 Talk 'N Text Tropang Texters roster
Players
Coaches

Pos.	#	POB	Name	Height	Weight	DOB (YYYY–MM–DD)	From
PG	3	(United States)	Jimmy Alapag (C)	5 ft 11 in (1.80 m)	160 lb (73 kg)		Cal State San Bernardino
PF	4	(United States)	Harvey Carey	6 ft 3 in (1.91 m)	210 lb (95 kg)		Sonoma State
G/F	6	(Philippines)	Riego Gamalinda	6 ft 3 in (1.91 m)	184 lb (83 kg)		San Beda
G	10	(United States)	Ryan Reyes	6 ft 1 in (1.85 m)	190 lb (86 kg)		Cal State Fullerton
G/F	12	(Philippines)	Larry Fonacier	6 ft 2 in (1.88 m)	170 lb (77 kg)		Ateneo
PG	16	(Philippines)	John Raymundo (R)	5 ft 10 in (1.78 m)	170 lb (77 kg)		San Sebastian
G	17	(Philippines)	Jayson Castro	5 ft 11 in (1.80 m)	167 lb (76 kg)		Philippine Christian
C	18	(Philippines)	Gilbert Lao	6 ft 7 in (2.01 m)	210 lb (95 kg)		UST
G/F	20	(United States)	Jared Dillinger	6 ft 5 in (1.96 m)	220 lb (100 kg)		Hawaiʻi
F	21	(United States)	Kelly Williams	6 ft 7 in (2.01 m)	215 lb (98 kg)		Oakland
F	33	(Philippines)	Ranidel De Ocampo	6 ft 6 in (1.98 m)	200 lb (91 kg)		Saint Francis of Assisi
F/C	34	(United States)	Ali Peek	6 ft 4 in (1.93 m)	240 lb (109 kg)		Saint Mary's
F/C	35	(Philippines)	Japeth Aguilar	6 ft 9 in (2.06 m)	225 lb (102 kg)		Western Kentucky
F	40	(Japan)	Rich Alvarez	6 ft 4 in (1.93 m)	200 lb (91 kg)		Ateneo
G/F	51	(Philippines)	Aaron Aban	6 ft 3 in (1.91 m)	200 lb (91 kg)		Letran

Head coach

- (Philippines) Chot Reyes (Ateneo)

Assistant coach(es)

- (Philippines) Jamike Jarin (Ateneo)
- (Philippines) Nash Racela (Ateneo)
- (Philippines) Josh Reyes

Legend

- (C) Team captain
- (CI) Commissioner's Cup Import
- (GI) Governors' Cup Import
- (EI) EASL Import
- (DP) Unsigned draft pick
- (FA) Free agent
- (IN) Inactive
- (S) Suspended
- (R) Rookie
- Injured

== Philippine Cup ==
=== Eliminations ===
==== Standings ====
Pos	Team	W	L	PCT	GB	Qualification
1	B-Meg Llamados	10	4	.714 (Note: Head-to-head record: B-Meg 1–1 Talk 'N Text (B-Meg +8))	—	Twice-to-beat in the quarterfinals
2	Talk 'N Text Tropang Texters	10	4	.714	—	Twice-to-beat in the quarterfinals
3	Petron Blaze Boosters	9	5	.643 (Note: Head-to-head differential: Petron +8, Barangay Ginebra +1, Rain or Shine −9)	1	Best-of-three quarterfinals
4	Barangay Ginebra San Miguel	9	5	.643	1	Best-of-three quarterfinals
5	Rain or Shine Elasto Painters	9	5	.643	1	Best-of-three quarterfinals
6	Meralco Bolts	8	6	.571	2	Best-of-three quarterfinals
7	Barako Bull Energy Cola	6	8	.429 (Note: Head-to-head record: Barako Bull 1–1 Powerade (Barako Bull +35))	4	Twice-to-win in the quarterfinals
8	Powerade Tigers	6	8	.429	4	Twice-to-win in the quarterfinals
9	Alaska Aces	3	11	.214	7	
10	Shopinas.com Clickers	0	14	.000	10	

Source: PBA.ph

=== Bracket ===
Quarterfinals
(#1 twice-to-beat)
1	B-Meg	88	123
8	Powerade	97	131*
(Best-of-3)
4	Barangay Ginebra	0
5	Rain or Shine	2
(#2 twice-to-beat)
2	Talk 'N Text	81
7	Barako Bull	79
(Best-of-3)
3	Petron Blaze	2
6	Meralco	0

Semifinals (Best-of-7)
8	Powerade	4
5	Rain or Shine	3
2	Talk 'N Text	4
3	Petron Blaze	3

Finals (Best-of-7)
8	Powerade	1
2	Talk 'N Text	4

*Game went into overtime

=== Quarterfinals ===
==== Talk 'N Text vs. Barako Bull ====
December 14

Talk 'N Text Tropang Texters 81, Barako Bull Energy 79
Talk 'N Text wins series in one game

Smart Araneta Coliseum, Quezon City

=== Semifinals ===
==== Talk 'N Text-Petron Blaze series ====
January 5

Talk 'N Text Tropang Texters 87, Petron Blaze Boosters 83

Cuneta Astrodome, Pasay

January 7

Talk 'N Text Tropang Texters 89, Petron Blaze Boosters 91

Smart Araneta Coliseum, Quezon City

January 9

Talk 'N Text Tropang Texters 93, Petron Blaze Boosters 95

Cuneta Astrodome, Pasay

January 11

Talk 'N Text Tropang Texters 82, Petron Blaze Boosters 85

Smart Araneta Coliseum, Quezon City

January 13

Talk 'N Text Tropang Texters 93, Petron Blaze Boosters 91

Smart Araneta Coliseum, Quezon City

January 15

Talk 'N Text Tropang Texters 111, Petron Blaze Boosters 108

Smart Araneta Coliseum, Quezon City

January 18

Talk 'N Text Tropang Texters 92, Petron Blaze Boosters 91
Talk 'N Text wins series 4–3

Cuneta Astrodome, Pasay

=== Finals ===
January 20

Talk 'N Text Tropang Texters 116, Powerade Tigers 100

Davao del Sur Coliseum, Digos, Davao del Sur

January 23

Talk 'N Text Tropang Texters 102, Powerade Tigers 96

Smart Araneta Coliseum, Quezon City

January 25

Talk 'N Text Tropang Texters 133, Powerade Tigers 126 (OT)

Smart Araneta Coliseum, Quezon City

January 27

Talk 'N Text Tropang Texters 97, Powerade Tigers 100

Smart Araneta Coliseum, Quezon City

January 29

Talk 'N Text Tropang Texters 110, Powerade Tigers 101
Talk 'N Text wins series 4–1

Smart Araneta Coliseum, Quezon City

== Commissioner's Cup ==
=== Eliminations ===
==== Standings ====
Pos	Team	W	L	PCT	GB	Qualification
1	Talk 'N Text Tropang Texters	7	2	.778	—	Advance to semifinals
2	Barangay Ginebra Kings	6	3	.667 (Note: Second seed playoff: Barangay Ginebra 93–84 B-Meg)	1	Advance to semifinals
3	B-Meg Llamados	6	3	.667	1	Advance to quarterfinals
4	Alaska Aces	5	4	.556	2	Advance to quarterfinals
5	Barako Bull Energy Cola	4	5	.444 (Note: Head-to-head quotient: Barako Bull 1.04, Meralco 1.01, Powerade 0.95; sixth seed playoff: Meralco 102–98 Powerade)	3	Advance to quarterfinals
6	Meralco Bolts	4	5	.444	3	Advance to quarterfinals
7	Powerade Tigers	4	5	.444	3	
8	Rain or Shine Elasto Painters	3	6	.333 (Note: Head-to-head quotient: Rain or Shine 1.12, Petron 1.11, Air21 0.80)	4	
9	Petron Blaze Boosters	3	6	.333	4	
10	Air21 Express	3	6	.333	4	

Source: PBA.ph

=== Bracket ===
Quarterfinals (Best-of-3)
4	Alaska	1
5	Barako Bull	2
3	B-Meg	2
6	Meralco	1

Semifinals (Best-of-5)
1	Talk 'N Text	3
5	Barako Bull	2
2	Barangay Ginebra	1
3	B-Meg	3

Finals (Best-of-7)
1	Talk 'N Text	3
3	B-Meg	4

=== Semifinals ===
==== Talk 'N Text–Barako Bull series ====
April 10

Talk 'N Text Tropang Texters 77, Barako Bull Energy 84

Ynares Center, Antipolo

April 12

Talk 'N Text Tropang Texters 123, Barako Bull Energy 98

Ynares Center, Antipolo

April 14

Talk 'N Text Tropang Texters 81, Barako Bull Energy 85

Cuneta Astrodome, Pasay

April 16

Talk 'N Text Tropang Texters 108, Barako Bull Energy 90

Smart Araneta Coliseum, Quezon City

April 18

Talk 'N Text Tropang Texters 101, Barako Bull Energy 90
Talk 'N Text wins series, 3-2

Smart Araneta Coliseum, Quezon City

=== Finals ===
April 23

Talk 'N Text Tropang Texters 82, B-Meg Llamados 88

Smart Araneta Coliseum, Quezon City

April 25

Talk 'N Text Tropang Texters 104, B-Meg Llamados 102

Smart Araneta Coliseum, Quezon City

April 27

Talk 'N Text Tropang Texters 87, B-Meg Llamados 91

Smart Araneta Coliseum, Quezon City

April 29

Talk 'N Text Tropang Texters 100, B-Meg Llamados 85

Smart Araneta Coliseum, Quezon City

May 2

Talk 'N Text Tropang Texters 66, B-Meg Llamados 82

Smart Araneta Coliseum, Quezon City

May 4

Talk 'N Text Tropang Texters 92, B-Meg Llamados 82

Smart Araneta Coliseum, Quezon City

May 6

Talk 'N Text Tropang Texters 84, B-Meg Llamados 90 (OT)
B-Meg wins series, 4-3

Smart Araneta Coliseum, Quezon City

== Governors Cup ==
=== Eliminations ===
==== Standings ====
Pos	Team	W	L	PCT	GB	Qualification
1	Rain or Shine Elasto Painters	8	1	.889	—	Semifinal round
2	B-Meg Llamados	6	3	.667	2	Semifinal round
3	Talk 'N Text Tropang Texters	5	4	.556 (Note: Head-to-head differential: Talk 'N Text +18, Barangay Ginebra 0, Petron −18)	3	Semifinal round
4	Barangay Ginebra Kings	5	4	.556	3	Semifinal round
5	Petron Blaze Boosters	5	4	.556	3	Semifinal round
6	Meralco Bolts	4	5	.444 (Note: Head-to-head differential: Meralco +11, Barako Bull +8, Powerade −18; sixth seed playoffs: Powerade 99–95 Barako Bull, Meralco 94–86 Powerade)	4	Semifinal round
7	Powerade Tigers	4	5	.444	4	
8	Barako Bull Energy Cola	4	5	.444	4	
9	Alaska Aces	2	7	.222 (Note: Head-to-head record: Alaska 1–0 Air21)	6	
10	Air21 Express	2	7	.222	6	

Source: PBA.ph

=== Semifinals ===
==== Standings ====
Overall standings
Pos	Team	W	L	PCT	GB	Qualification
1	Rain or Shine Elasto Painters	10	4	.714	—	Advance to finals (Note: If a team outside the top two teams wins four semifinal round games, then it and the second-placed team will playoff for the last finals berth; otherwise, the top 2 teams qualify outright.)
2	B-Meg Llamados	9	5	.643 (Note: Head-to-head record: B-Meg 2–0 Barangay Ginebra)	1	Guaranteed finals berth playoff
3	Barangay Ginebra Kings	9	5	.643	1	Qualify to finals berth playoff
4	Talk 'N Text Tropang Texters	8	6	.571	2	
5	Petron Blaze Boosters	6	8	.429 (Note: Head-to-head record: Meralco 1–1, Petron; Petron +12, Meralco −12)	4	
6	Meralco Bolts	6	8	.429	4	

Source: PBA.ph
Notes:

Semifinal round standings
Pos	Team	W	L	Qualification
1	Barangay Ginebra Kings	4	1	Qualify to finals berth playoff (Note: Finals berth playoff: B-Meg 74–72 Barangay Ginebra)
2	B-Meg Llamados	3	2	
3	Talk 'N Text Tropang Texters	3	2	
4	Rain or Shine Elasto Painters	2	3	
5	Meralco Bolts	2	3	
6	Petron Blaze Boosters	1	4	

Source: PBA.ph

== Transactions ==
=== Trades ===
==== Pre-season ====
August 28, 2011	To Talk 'N Text Bam Gamalinda (from Meralco); Shawn Weinstein (from Meralco)	To Meralco Mark Yee (from Talk 'N Text); 2011 1st round pick (Jason Ballesteros) (from Talk 'N Text); Mark Macapagal (from Powerade)	To Powerade Chris Timberlake (from Meralco); Ogie Menor (from Meralco); 2011 2nd round pick (John Marc Agustin) (from Talk 'N Text)

=== Subtractions ===
Player	Signed	New team
Shawn Weinstein	February 1, 2012	Barako Bull Energy

=== Recruited imports ===
Tournament	Name	Debuted	Last game	Record
Commissioner's Cup	Omar Samhan	February 17 (vs. Meralco)	February 26 (vs. Alaska)	2–0
Commissioner's Cup	Donnell Harvey	March 7 (vs. Air21)	May 6 (vs. B-Meg)	10–8
Governors Cup	Paul Harris	May 23 (vs. Meralco)	July 18 (vs. Ginebra)	8-6
