= 2012–13 Talk 'N Text Tropang Texters season =

- Head coach: Norman Black
- General manager: Aboy Castro
- Owners: Smart Communications (an MVP Group subsidiary)

Philippine Cup results
- Record: 12–2 (85.7%)
- Place: 1st
- Playoff finish: Champions (def. Rain or Shine, 4–0)

Commissioner's Cup results
- Record: 7–7 (50%)
- Place: 6th
- Playoff finish: Semifinalist (def. by Barangay Ginebra, 2–3)

Governors' Cup results
- Record: 3–6 (33.3%)
- Place: 9th
- Playoff finish: did not qualify

Talk 'N Text Tropang Texters seasons

The 2012–13 Talk 'N Text Tropang Texters season was the 23rd season of the franchise in the Philippine Basketball Association (PBA).

== Key dates ==
- Chot Reyes of the Talk 'N Text Tropang Texters stepped down as head coach at the end of the 2011–12 season due to his appointment as head coach of Smart Gilas. Team consultant Norman Black has been appointed as head coach starting this season. Due to Black's commitments as head coach of the Ateneo Blue Eagles in the UAAP, assistant coach Nash Racela will serve as interim head coach until the UAAP basketball tournament ends.
- August 19: The 2012 PBA Draft took place in Robinson's Midtown Mall, Manila.
- October 20: Norman Black formally took over as head coach, replacing interim coach Nash Racela.

== Draft picks ==
Round	Pick	Player	Position	Nationality	College
2	10	Jaypee Belencion	G/F	Philippines	Letran
3	10	Jason Escueta	F/C	Philippines	Ateneo de Manila

== Roster ==
2012–13 Talk 'N Text Tropang Texters roster
Players
Coaches

Pos.	#	POB	Name	Height	Weight	DOB (YYYY–MM–DD)	From
PG	3	(United States)	Jimmy Alapag (C)	5 ft 8 in (1.73 m)	160 lb (73 kg)		Cal State San Bernardino
PF	4	(United States)	Harvey Carey	6 ft 3 in (1.91 m)	210 lb (95 kg)		Sonoma State
G/F	6	(Philippines)	Riego Gamalinda	6 ft 3 in (1.91 m)	184 lb (83 kg)		San Beda
C/G	10	(United States)	Ryan Reyes	6 ft 1 in (1.85 m)	190 lb (86 kg)		Cal State Fullerton
SF	11	(Canada)	Sean Anthony	6 ft 4 in (1.93 m)	200 lb (91 kg)		McGill
G/F	12	(Philippines)	Larry Fonacier	6 ft 2 in (1.88 m)	170 lb (77 kg)		Ateneo
G/F	14	(Philippines)	Jimbo Aquino	6 ft 3 in (1.91 m)	180 lb (82 kg)		San Sebastian
PG	15	(Philippines)	Jai Reyes	5 ft 9 in (1.75 m)	150 lb (68 kg)		Ateneo
PG	16	(Philippines)	John Raymundo	5 ft 10 in (1.78 m)	170 lb (77 kg)		San Sebastian
C/G	17	(Philippines)	Jayson Castro	5 ft 10 in (1.78 m)	167 lb (76 kg)		Philippine Christian
F	21	(United States)	Kelly Williams (IN)	6 ft 7 in (2.01 m)	215 lb (98 kg)		Oakland
PF	22	(Philippines)	John Ferriols	6 ft 4 in (1.93 m)	205 lb (93 kg)		USJ–R
C	24	(Philippines)	Rabeh Al-Hussaini	6 ft 7 in (2.01 m)	240 lb (109 kg)		Ateneo
F	33	(Philippines)	Ranidel De Ocampo	6 ft 5 in (1.96 m)	200 lb (91 kg)		Saint Francis of Assisi
F/C	34	(United States)	Ali Peek	6 ft 4 in (1.93 m)	220 lb (100 kg)		Saint Mary's
F	40	(Japan)	Rich Alvarez	6 ft 4 in (1.93 m)	200 lb (91 kg)		Ateneo
G/F	51	(Philippines)	Aaron Aban	6 ft 3 in (1.91 m)	200 lb (91 kg)		Letran

Head coach

- (United States) Norman Black (Saint Joseph's)

Assistant coach(es)

- (Philippines) Nash Racela
- (Philippines) Sandy Arespacochaga (Ateneo)
- (Philippines) Gene Afable (Ateneo)
- (Philippines) Josh Reyes
- (Philippines) Jamike Jarin

Legend

- (C) Team captain
- (CI) Commissioner's Cup Import
- (GI) Governors' Cup Import
- (EI) EASL Import
- (DP) Unsigned draft pick
- (FA) Free agent
- (IN) Inactive
- (S) Suspended
- (R) Rookie
- Injured

Roster

== Philippine Cup ==
=== Eliminations ===
==== Standings ====
Pos	Team	W	L	PCT	GB	Qualification
1	Talk 'N Text Tropang Texters	12	2	.857	—	Twice-to-beat in the quarterfinals
2	San Mig Coffee Mixers	10	4	.714	2	Twice-to-beat in the quarterfinals
3	Rain or Shine Elasto Painters	9	5	.643	3	Best-of-three quarterfinals
4	Meralco Bolts	8	6	.571 (Note: Head-to-head record: Alaska 1–1 Meralco (Meralco +4))	4	Best-of-three quarterfinals
5	Alaska Aces	8	6	.571	4	Best-of-three quarterfinals
6	Barangay Ginebra San Miguel	7	7	.500	5	Best-of-three quarterfinals
7	Petron Blaze Boosters	6	8	.429	6	Twice-to-win in the quarterfinals
8	Air21 Express	5	9	.357	7	Twice-to-win in the quarterfinals
9	Barako Bull Energy Cola	4	10	.286	8	
10	GlobalPort Batang Pier	1	13	.071	11	

Source: PBA.ph

==== Game log ====
2013 PBA Philippine Cup game log
October

Game	Date	Opponent	Score	High points	High rebounds	High assists	Location Attendance	Record	
1	October 5	Meralco	112–110*	Dillinger (20)	Peek (9)	Dillinger, Castro, Reyes (5)	Smart Araneta Coliseum	1–0	Boxscore
2	October 12	GlobalPort	108–104	Castro (30)	de Ocampo (9)	Alapag (6)	Smart Araneta Coliseum	2–0	Boxscore
3	October 17	Air21	96–89	de Ocampo (19)	Williams (13)	Alapag, Castro (4)	Mall of Asia Arena	3–0	Boxscore
4	October 20	San Mig Coffee	85–74	Fonacier (26)	Williams (12)	Castro (5)	Ynares Center	4–0	Boxscore
5	October 24	Barako Bull	79–76	Castro (15)	Williams (13)	Reyes (6)	Smart Araneta Coliseum	5–0	Boxscore
6	October 27	Rain or Shine	80–77	Alapag (15)	Williams (12)	Alapag (7)	Victorias City	6–0	Boxscore

November

Game	Date	Opponent	Score	High points	High rebounds	High assists	Location Attendance	Record	
7	November 2	Alaska	92–94	Alapag (17)	Williams (9)	Reyes (7)	Smart Araneta Coliseum	6–1	Boxscore
8	November 7	Petron Blaze	92–82	Fonacier (21)	Castro (9)	Alapag, Castro (5)	Smart Araneta Coliseum	7–1	Boxscore
9	November 11	Barangay Ginebra	101–104	de Ocampo (20)	de Ocampo (10)	Castro (7)	Mall of Asia Arena	7–2	Boxscore
10	November 16	Meralco	109–98	Castro (23)	Reyes (8)	Alapag (7)	Ynares Center	8–2	Boxscore
11	November 21	San Mig Coffee	92–63	Alapag (19)	Williams (11)	Castro (7)	Smart Araneta Coliseum	9–2	Boxscore
12	November 25	Air21	100–94	Alapag (18)	Fonacier (9)	Alapag (6)	Smart Araneta Coliseum	10–2	Boxscore
13	November 28	Petron Blaze	95–82	Castro (23)	Williams (9)	Castro (5)	Smart Araneta Coliseum	11–2	Boxscore

December

Game	Date	Opponent	Score	High points	High rebounds	High assists	Location Attendance	Record	
14	December 9	Barangay Ginebra	87–80	Castro (24)	Peek (18)	Castro (5)	Smart Araneta Coliseum	12–2	Boxscore

2012–13 schedule

=== Playoffs ===
==== Bracket ====
Quarterfinals
(#1 twice-to-beat)
1	Talk 'N Text	105
8	Air21	100
(Best-of-3)
4	Meralco	0
5	Alaska	2
(#2 twice-to-beat)
2	San Mig Coffee	92*
7	Petron Blaze	87
(Best-of-3)
3	Rain or Shine	2
6	Barangay Ginebra	1

Semifinals (Best-of-7)
1	Talk 'N Text	4
5	Alaska	2
2	San Mig Coffee	2
3	Rain or Shine	4

Finals (Best-of-7)
1	Talk 'N Text	4
3	Rain or Shine	0

*Game went into overtime

==== Game log ====
2013 PBA Philippine Cup playoffs game log
Quarterfinals: 1–0

Game	Date	Opponent	Score	High points	High rebounds	High assists	Location Attendance	Series	
1	December 13	Air21	105–100	Reyes, Fonacier (16)	Reyes (9)	Alapag (6)	Smart Araneta Coliseum	1–0	Boxscore

Semifinals: 4–2

Game	Date	Opponent	Score	High points	High rebounds	High assists	Location Attendance	Series	
1	December 19	Alaska	66–65	Castro (17)	Castro (11)	Alapag (3)	Smart Araneta Coliseum	1–0	Boxscore
2	December 21	Alaska	88–100	Dillinger (26)	Peek, Carey (6)	Alapag (6)	Mall of Asia Arena	1–1	Boxscore
3	December 26	Alaska	93–79	Williams (23)	Williams (9)	Alapag (11)	Mall of Asia Arena	2–1	Boxscore
4	December 28	Alaska	99–104	Alapag (17)	Williams (11)	Alapag, Castro (5)	Mall of Asia Arena	2–2	Boxscore
5	December 30	Alaska	99–95	Reyes (15)	Williams (9)	Alapag, Castro (5)	Mall of Asia Arena	3–2	
6	January 4	Alaska	83–78	Castro (16)	Williams (10)	Castro (4)	Cuneta Astrodome	4–2	Boxscore

Finals: 4–0

Game	Date	Opponent	Score	High points	High rebounds	High assists	Location Attendance	Series	
1	January 9	Rain or Shine	87–81	Castro, de Ocampo (16)	Williams (12)	Alapag (6)	Smart Araneta Coliseum	1–0	Boxscore
2	January 11	Rain or Shine	89–81	de Ocampo (30)	de Ocampo (9)	de Ocampo, Alapag (4)	Mall of Asia Arena	2–0	Boxscore
3	January 13	Rain or Shine	89–80	Castro (19)	Reyes, Williams, Carey (8)	Alapag, Castro (4)	Smart Araneta Coliseum	3–0	Boxscore
4	January 16	Rain or Shine	105–82	de Ocampo (19)	Williams (11)	Alapag (8)	Smart Araneta Coliseum	4–0	Boxscore

2012–13 schedule

== Commissioner's Cup ==
=== Eliminations ===
==== Standings ====
Pos	Team	W	L	PCT	GB	Qualification
1	Alaska Aces	11	3	.786	—	Twice-to-beat in the quarterfinals
2	Rain or Shine Elasto Painters	9	5	.643	2	Twice-to-beat in the quarterfinals
3	Petron Blaze Boosters	8	6	.571 (Note: Head-to-head record: Petron 2–0 San Mig)	3	Best-of-three quarterfinals
4	San Mig Coffee Mixers	8	6	.571	3	Best-of-three quarterfinals
5	Meralco Bolts	7	7	.500 (Note: Head-to-head quotient: Meralco 1.01, TNT 1.00, Barangay Ginebra 0.99)	4	Best-of-three quarterfinals
6	Talk 'N Text Tropang Texters	7	7	.500	4	Best-of-three quarterfinals
7	Barangay Ginebra San Miguel	7	7	.500	4	Twice-to-win in the quarterfinals
8	Air21 Express	6	8	.429	5	Twice-to-win in the quarterfinals
9	Barako Bull Energy Cola	5	9	.357	6	
10	GlobalPort Batang Pier	2	12	.143	9	

Source: PBA.ph

==== Game log ====
2013 PBA Commissioner's Cup game log
February

Game	Date	Opponent	Score	High points	High rebounds	High assists	Location Attendance	Record	
1	February 9	Meralco	92–99	Benson (25)	Benson (11)	Alapag, de Ocampo (5)	Smart Araneta Coliseum	0–1	boxscore
2	February 15	Air21	86–83	Benson (30)	Benson (18)	Castro, Fonacier (4)	Smart Araneta Coliseum	1–1	boxscore
3	February 20	GlobalPort	99–79	Benson (20)	Benson (19)	Alapag (7)	Smart Araneta Coliseum	2–1	boxscore
4	February 24	San Mig Coffee	82–90	Castro (18)	Benson (17)	Alapag (5)	Smart Araneta Coliseum	2–2	boxscore

March

Game	Date	Opponent	Score	High points	High rebounds	High assists	Location Attendance	Record	
5	March 1	Alaska	69–92	Benson (27)	Benson (14)	Alapag (4)	Smart Araneta Coliseum	2–3	boxscore
6	March 9	Barako Bull	101–98	Al-Hussaini (19)	Harvey (10)	Alapag (4)	Legaspi City, Albay	3–3	boxscore
7	March 13	Rain or Shine					Smart Araneta Coliseum		
8	March 17	Barangay Ginebra					Smart Araneta Coliseum		
9	March 22	Petron Blaze					Smart Araneta Coliseum		

2012–13 schedule

== Governors' Cup ==
=== Eliminations ===
==== Standings ====
Pos	Team	W	L	PCT	GB	Qualification
1	Petron Blaze Boosters	8	1	.889	—	Twice-to-beat in the quarterfinals
2	San Mig Coffee Mixers	6	3	.667	2	Twice-to-beat in the quarterfinals
3	Meralco Bolts	5	4	.556 (Note: Head-to-head record: Meralco 1–0 Rain or Shine)	3	Twice-to-beat in the quarterfinals
4	Rain or Shine Elasto Painters	5	4	.556	3	Twice-to-beat in the quarterfinals
5	GlobalPort Batang Pier	4	5	.444 (Note: Head-to-head quotient: GlobalPort 1.01, Barako Bull 1.00, Alaska 0.99)	4	Twice-to-win in the quarterfinals
6	Barako Bull Energy	4	5	.444	4	Twice-to-win in the quarterfinals
7	Alaska Aces	4	5	.444	4	Twice-to-win in the quarterfinals
8	Barangay Ginebra San Miguel	3	6	.333 (Note: Head-to-head quotient: Talk 'N Text 1.05, Barangay Ginebra 1.00, Air21 0.96; eighth seed playoff: Barangay Ginebra 110–102 Talk 'N Text)	5	Twice-to-win in the quarterfinals
9	Talk 'N Text Tropang Texters	3	6	.333	5	
10	Air21 Express	3	6	.333	5	

Source: PBA.ph

==== Game log ====
2013 PBA Governors' Cup game log
August

Game	Date	Opponent	Score	High points	High rebounds	High assists	Location Attendance	Record	
1	August 16	Barako Bull	118–113 (OT)	Mitchell (48)	Mitchell (11)	three players (3)	Smart Araneta Coliseum	1–0	Boxscore; Recap
2	August 25	San Mig Coffee	99–118	Mitchell (38)			Mall of Asia Arena	1–1	Recap
3	August 30	Meralco	86–92	Mitchell (32)	Mitchell (11)	Castro (7)	Smart Araneta Coliseum	1–2	Boxscore; Recap

September

Game	Date	Opponent	Score	High points	High rebounds	High assists	Location Attendance	Record	
4	September 1	GlobalPort	102–95	Mitchell (35)	Al-Hussaini (15)	Reyes (7)	Mall of Asia Arena	2–2	Boxscore; Recap
5	September 6	Alaska					Mall of Asia Arena		
6	September 7	Petron					Smart Araneta Coliseum		
7	September 13	Air21					PhilSports Arena		
8	September 18	Rain or Shine					Cuneta Astrodome		
9	September 22	Barangay Ginebra					Mall of Asia Arena		

2012–13 schedule

== Transactions ==
=== Trades ===
==== Pre-season ====
- None

==== Philippine Cup ====
- None

==== Commissioner's Cup ====
January 31, 2013	To Talk 'N Text Rabeh Al-Hussaini	To GlobalPort Japeth Aguilar

June 10, 2013	To Talk 'N Text Sean Anthony	To Barako Bull Jared Dillinger

=== Governors' Cup ===
October 14, 2013	To Talk 'N Text Rob Reyes; 2015 2nd draft pick	To Air21 Rabeh Al-Hussaini

October 14, 2013	To Talk 'N Text Nonoy Baclao; Eric Salamat	To Air21 Pamboy Raymundo; Bambam Gamalinda

=== Recruited imports ===
Tournament	Name	Debuted	Last game	Record
Commissioner's Cup	Keith Benson	February 9 (vs. Meralco)	March 1 vs. (Alaska)	2–3
Commissioner's Cup	Donnell Harvey	March 9 (vs. Barako Bull)	April 6 (vs. GlobalPort)	4–3
Commissioner's Cup	Jerome Jordan	April 14 (vs. Brgy. Ginebra)	April 28 (vs. Brgy. Ginebra)	4–2
Commissioner's Cup	Tony Mitchell	May 8 (vs. Brgy. Ginebra)	May 12 (vs. Brgy. Ginebra)	1–2
Governors' Cup	Tony Mitchell	August 15 (vs. Barako Bull)	September 13 (vs. Air21)	2–5
Governors' Cup	Courtney Fells	September 18 (vs. Rain or Shine)	September 24 (vs. Barangay Ginebra)	1–2
