= 2007–08 Sta. Lucia Realtors season =

- Head coach: Boyet Fernandez
- Owner(s): Sta. Lucia Realty and Development Corporation

Philippine Cup results
- Record: 20–12 (62.5%)
- Place: 1st
- Playoff finish: Champions (def. Purefoods, 4-3)

Fiesta Conference results
- Record: 9–13 (40.9%)
- Place: 6th
- Playoff finish: Quarterfinals (lost to Brgy.Ginebra, 0–2)

Sta. Lucia Realtors seasons

The 2007–08 Sta. Lucia Realtors season was the 15th season of the franchise in the Philippine Basketball Association (PBA).

== Key dates ==
August 19: The 2007 PBA Draft took place at Market! Market! in Bonifacio Global City, Taguig.

== Draft picks ==
| Round | Pick | Player | Height | Position | Nationality | College |
|---|---|---|---|---|---|---|
| 1 | 3 | Ryan Reyes | 6'2" | Guard | United States | Cal State Fullerton |
| 2 | 11 | Ronjay Buenafe | 6'2" | Guard | Philippines | EAC |
| 2 | 13 | Melvin Mamaclay | 6'5" | Forward | Philippines | Adamson |

== Roster ==
2007–08 Sta. Lucia Realtors roster
Players

| Pos. | # | POB | Name | Height | Weight | DOB (YYYY–MM–DD) | From |
|---|---|---|---|---|---|---|---|
| F | 3 | (Philippines) | Nelbert Omolon | 6 ft 4 in (1.93 m) | | | Philippine Christian |
| G | 8 | (Philippines) | Paolo Mendoza | 5 ft 11 in (1.80 m) | | | Philippines |
| C | 9 | (Philippines) | Philip Butel | 6 ft 7 in (2.01 m) | | | UE |
| G | 10 | (United States) | Ryan Reyes | 6 ft 2 in (1.88 m) | | | Cal State Fullerton |
| C | 13 | (Philippines) | Marlou Aquino | 6 ft 9 in (2.06 m) | | | Adamson |
| F | 14 | (Philippines) | Dennis Daa | 6 ft 5 in (1.96 m) | | | Centro Escolar Las Piñas |
| F/C | 16 | (Philippines) | Dennis Espino (C) | 6 ft 6 in (1.98 m) | | | UST |
| G | 18 | (Philippines) | Joseph Yeo | 5 ft 11 in (1.80 m) | | | De La Salle |
| F | 19 | (Philippines) | Melvin Mamaclay | 6 ft 5 in (1.96 m) | | | Adamson |
| F | 21 | (United States) | Kelly Williams | 6 ft 7 in (2.01 m) | | | Oakland |
| G | 25 | (Philippines) | Ronnie Bughao | 5 ft 11 in (1.80 m) | | | San Beda |
| F | 28 | (Philippines) | Norman Gonzales | 6 ft 4 in (1.93 m) | | | San Beda |
| G | 32 | (Philippines) | Dennis Miranda | 6 ft 0 in (1.83 m) | | | Far Eastern |
| G | 40 | (Philippines) | Christian Coronel | 5 ft 11 in (1.80 m) | | | San Sebastian |
| F | | (Philippines) | Alvin Pua | 6 ft 5 in (1.96 m) | | | San Sebastian |
| C | 23 | (United States) | Wesley Wilson | 6 ft 11 in (2.11 m) | | | Georgetown |
| C | 30 | (United States) | Jamar Brown | 6 ft 9 in (2.06 m) | | | CSU Pueblo |
| C | 44 | (United States) | Lee Benson | 6 ft 10 in (2.08 m) | | | Brown Mackie |

Coaches
Head coach
- (Philippines) Boyet Fernandez
Assistant(s)
- (Philippines) Adonis Tierra
- (Philippines) Cholo Martin
- (Philippines) Jaime Serrano, Jr

Legend
- (DP) Unsigned draft pick
- (FA) Free agent
- (S) Suspended
- (I) Imports
- Injured

== Philippine Cup ==
=== Team standings ===
| # | 2007-08 PBA Philippine Cup | | | | | |
| # | Team | W | L | PCT | GB | Tie |
|---|---|---|---|---|---|---|
| 1 | y-Purefoods Tender Juicy Giants | 12 | 6 | .667 | – | |
| 2 | y-Sta. Lucia Realtors | 12 | 6 | .667 | – | |
| 3 | x-Alaska Aces | 11 | 7 | .611 | 1 | |
| 4 | x-Red Bull Barako | 11 | 7 | .611 | 1 | |
| 5 | x-Magnolia Beverage Masters | 10 | 8 | .556 | 2 | |
| 6 | w-Talk 'N Text Phone Pals | 9 | 9 | .500 | 3 | |
| 7 | w-Barangay Ginebra Kings | 8 | 10 | .444 | 4 | |
| 8 | w-Air21 Express | 7 | 11 | .389 | 5 | |
| 9 | w-Coca Cola Tigers | 7 | 11 | .389 | 5 | |
| 10 | e-Welcoat Dragons | 3 | 15 | .167 | 9 | |

Legend:

- y-Qualified for semifinals
- x-Qualified for quarterfinals
- w-Qualified for the wildcard phase
- e-Eliminated

=== Game log ===
2008 PBA Philippine Cup game log
October

| Game | Date | Opponent | Score | High points | High rebounds | High assists | Location Attendance | Record |
|---|---|---|---|---|---|---|---|---|
| 1 | October 17 | Purefoods | 89–96 | Williams (19) | | | Araneta Coliseum | 0–1 |
| 2 | October 21 | Magnolia | 96–101 | Yeo (24) | | | Araneta Coliseum | 0–2 |
| 3 | October 28 | Talk 'N Text | 97-87 | Aquino (18) Mendoza (18) | | | Araneta Coliseum | 1–2 |

November

| Game | Date | Opponent | Score | High points | High rebounds | High assists | Location Attendance | Record |
|---|---|---|---|---|---|---|---|---|
| 4 | November 2 | Red Bull | 94–100 | Williams (20) | | | Cuneta Astrodome | 1–3 |
| 5 | November 7 | Air21 | 115-80 | Gonzales (17) | | | Cuneta Astrodome | 2–3 |
| 6 | November 10 | Brgy.Ginebra | 90–103 | Yeo (24) | | | General Santos | 2–4 |
| 7 | November 14 | Coca Cola | 97-63 | Yeo (16) Williams (16) | | | Araneta Coliseum | 3–4 |
| 8 | November 21 | Welcoat | 84-83 | Williams (18) | | | Araneta Coliseum | 4–4 |
| 9 | November 25 | Purefoods | 81–84 | Williams (27) | | | Araneta Coliseum | 4–5 |

December

| Game | Date | Opponent | Score | High points | High rebounds | High assists | Location Attendance | Record |
|---|---|---|---|---|---|---|---|---|
| 10 | December 1 | Coca Cola | 79–94 | Williams (18) | | | Lucena City | 4–6 |
| 11 | December 5 | Alaska | 94-88 | Omolon (25) | | | Araneta Coliseum | 5–6 |
| 12 | December 9 | Brgy.Ginebra | 79-78 | Williams (16) Espino (16) | | | Cuneta Astrodome | 6–6 |
| 13 | December 14 | Red Bull | 104-78 | Reyes (26) | | | Cuneta Astrodome | 7–6 |
| 14 | December 19 | Alaska | 101-96 | Williams (21) | | | Cuneta Astrodome | 8–6 |
| 15 | December 23 | Talk 'N Text | 92-91 | Williams (22) | | | Cuneta Astrodome | 9–6 |
| 16 | December 28 | Welcoat | 107-93 | Williams (20) | | | Araneta Coliseum | 10–6 |

January

| Game | Date | Opponent | Score | High points | High rebounds | High assists | Location Attendance | Record |
|---|---|---|---|---|---|---|---|---|
| 17 | January 6 | Magnolia | 99-77 | Williams (21) | Williams (18) | | Araneta Coliseum | 11–6 |
| 18 | January 13 | Air21 | 123-106 | Omolon (40) | | | Araneta Coliseum | 12–6 |

2007–08 schedule

== Fiesta Conference ==
=== Game log ===
2008 PBA Fiesta Conference game log
April

| Game | Date | Opponent | Score | High points | High rebounds | High assists | Location Attendance | Record |
|---|---|---|---|---|---|---|---|---|
| 1 | April 2 | Alaska | 93-86 | Wilson (24) | Wilson (13) | | Araneta Coliseum | 1–0 |
| 2 | April 6 | Magnolia | 88-86 | Williams (27) | | | Ynares Center | 2–0 |
| 3 | April 12 | Brgy.Ginebra | 101-97 | | | | Tacloban City | 3–0 |
| 4 | April 18 | Talk 'N Text | 113–115 | Wilson (29) | | | Araneta Coliseum | 3–1 |
| 5 | April 22 | Coca Cola | 88–95 | | | | Cuneta Astrodome | 3–2 |

May

| Game | Date | Opponent | Score | High points | High rebounds | High assists | Location Attendance | Record |
|---|---|---|---|---|---|---|---|---|
| 6 | May 4 | Welcoat | 111-97 | Wilson (24) | | | Araneta Coliseum | 4–2 |
| 7 | May 7 | Red Bull | 78–105 | Omolon (20) | | | Araneta Coliseum | 4–3 |
| 8 | May 11 | Air21 | 113-100 | Wilson (25) Williams (25) | | | Araneta Coliseum | 5–3 |
| 9 | May 17 | Talk 'N Text | 80–90 | | | | Cagayan de Oro | 5–4 |
| 10 | May 23 | Welcoat | 88-79 | Wilson (34) | | | Ynares Center | 6–4 |
| 11 | May 25 | Purefoods | 74–82 | | | | Cuneta Astrodome | 6–5 |

June

| Game | Date | Opponent | Score | High points | High rebounds | High assists | Location Attendance | Record |
|---|---|---|---|---|---|---|---|---|
| 12 | June 1 | Air21 | 93–95 OT | Williams (27) | | | Araneta Coliseum | 6–6 |
| 13 | June 6 | Brgy.Ginebra | 104–112 | Espino (28) | | | Cuneta Astrodome | 6–7 |
| 14 | June 13 | Magnolia | 74–80 | Benson (19) | | | Cuneta Astrodome | 6–8 |
| 15 | June 18 | Alaska | 95-75 | Benson (22) | | | Araneta Coliseum | 7–8 |
| 16 | June 27 | Purefoods | 89–104 | Miranda (17) | | | Araneta Coliseum | 7–9 |

July

| Game | Date | Opponent | Score | High points | High rebounds | High assists | Location Attendance | Record |
|---|---|---|---|---|---|---|---|---|
| 17 | July 2 | Coca Cola | | | | | Araneta Coliseum | 7–10 |
| 18 | July 6 | Red Bull | 81–85 | Benson (27) | | | Cuneta Astrodome | 7–11 |

2007–08 schedule
