= 2009–10 Sta. Lucia Realtors season =

- Head coach: Boyet Fernandez
- Owner(s): Sta. Lucia Realty and Development Corporation

Philippine Cup results
- Record: 10–8 (55.6%)
- Place: 6th
- Playoff finish: Wildcards (by Rain or Shine 90–86)

Fiesta Conference results
- Record: 8–10 (44.4%)
- Place: 8th
- Playoff finish: Wildcards (by Coca Cola 100–84)

Sta. Lucia Realtors seasons

The 2009–10 Sta. Lucia Realtors season was the 17th and final season of the franchise in the Philippine Basketball Association (PBA).

== Key dates ==
- August 2: The 2009 PBA Draft took place in Fort Bonifacio, Taguig.

== Draft picks ==
Round	Pick	Player	Height	Position	Nationality	College
2	11	Mark Benitez			Philippines	De La Salle
2	17	Charles Waters			United States	

== Roster ==
2009–10 Sta. Lucia Realtors roster
Players

Pos.	#	POB	Name	Height	Weight	DOB (YYYY–MM–DD)	From
F/C	1	(United States)	Nic Belasco	6 ft 6 in (1.98 m)	210 lb (95 kg)		Notre Dame (MD)
G	2	(United States)	Joshua Urbiztondo	5 ft 11 in (1.80 m)	180 lb (82 kg)		Fresno Pacific
F	3	(Philippines)	Nelbert Omolon	6 ft 3 in (1.91 m)	185 lb (84 kg)		Philippine Christian
F	5	(Philippines)	Gabby Espinas	6 ft 4 in (1.93 m)	194 lb (88 kg)		Philippine Christian
G	6	(Philippines)	Chris Ross	5 ft 11 in (1.80 m)	170 lb (77 kg)		Marshall
F	7	(Philippines)	Kelvin Gregorio	6 ft 3 in (1.91 m)	190 lb (86 kg)		UE
G	9	(Philippines)	Bonbon Custodio	5 ft 11 in (1.80 m)	165 lb (75 kg)		UE
F	11	(Philippines)	Yousif Aljamal	6 ft 4 in (1.93 m)	205 lb (93 kg)		San Beda
C	13	(Philippines)	Marlou Aquino	6 ft 9 in (2.06 m)	240 lb (109 kg)		Adamson
F	15	(Philippines)	Jason Misolas	6 ft 4 in (1.93 m)	200 lb (91 kg)		Letran
G	18	(Philippines)	Pong Escobal	5 ft 11 in (1.80 m)	180 lb (82 kg)		San Beda
G	22	(United States)	Chris Pacana	6 ft 0 in (1.83 m)	175 lb (79 kg)		Saint Francis of Assisi
PG	24	(Philippines)	Donbel Belano	5 ft 8 in (1.73 m)	178 lb (81 kg)		Visayas
G/F	33	(Philippines)	Rogemar Menor	6 ft 2 in (1.88 m)	190 lb (86 kg)		San Beda
F/C	34	(United States)	Ali Peek	6 ft 4 in (1.93 m)	240 lb (109 kg)		Saint Mary's

Coaches
Head coach
- (Philippines) Boyet Fernandez (CSA–Bacolod)
Assistant(s)
- (Philippines) Adonis Tierra (José Rizal)
- (Philippines) Cholo Martin (San Beda)

Legend
- (DP) Unsigned draft pick
- (FA) Free agent
- (S) Suspended
- Injured

== Philippine Cup ==
=== Eliminations ===
==== Standings ====
Pos	Team	W	L	PCT	GB	Qualification
1	Alaska Aces	13	5	.722 (Note: Head-to-head record: Alaska 2–0 San Miguel)	—	Advance to semifinals
2	San Miguel Beermen	13	5	.722	—	Advance to semifinals
3	Purefoods Tender Juicy Giants	12	6	.667 (Note: Head-to-head record: Purefoods 1–1 Barangay Ginebra; Purefoods 0, Barangay Ginebra 0; overall point differential: Purefoods +85, Barangay Ginebra +75)	1	Advance to quarterfinals
4	Barangay Ginebra Kings	12	6	.667	1	Advance to quarterfinals
5	Talk 'N Text Tropang Texters	11	7	.611	2	Advance to quarterfinals
6	Sta. Lucia Realtors	10	8	.556	3	Advance to wildcard round
7	Coca-Cola Tigers	6	12	.333 (Note: Head-to-head record: Burger King 1–1, Coca-Cola; Burger King +10, Coca-Cola −10)	7	Advance to wildcard round
8	Burger King Whoppers	6	12	.333	7	Advance to wildcard round
9	Rain or Shine Elasto Painters	4	14	.222	9	Advance to wildcard round
10	Barako Bull Energy Boosters	3	15	.167	10	
—	Smart Gilas (G)	3	6	.333	5.5	Guest team (Note: Smart Gilas's results do not count in the standings.)

Source: PBA.ph
(G) Guests

==== Game log ====
===== Eliminations =====
2010 PBA Philippine Cup game log
October

Game	Date	Opponent	Score	High points	High rebounds	High assists	Location Attendance	Record
1	October 16	Coca Cola	95–76	Reyes (21)	Espinas (11)	Yeo (10)	Araneta Coliseum	1–0
2	October 21	Rain or Shine	95–90	Williams (28)	Espinas (15)	Williams (6)	Cuneta Astrodome	2–0
3	October 25	Talk 'N Text	83–100	Yeo, Omolon (17)	Williams (16)	Yeo (4)	Araneta Coliseum	2–1
4	October 30	Burger King	101–93	Urbiztondo (24)	Williams (14)	Reyes, Yeo (6)	Araneta Coliseum	3–1

November

Game	Date	Opponent	Score	High points	High rebounds	High assists	Location Attendance	Record
5	November 4	Alaska	83–91	Williams (20)	Williams (14)	Yeo (4)	Araneta Coliseum	3–2
6	November 7	San Miguel	69–88	Espinas (17)	Williams (14)	Reyes (6)	Victoria City, Negros Occidental	3–3
7	November 13	Smart Gilas	96–95				Ynares Center	
8	November 18	Barangay Ginebra	93–72	Williams (26)	Williams (14)	Williams (7)	Araneta Coliseum	4–3
9	November 22	Barako Bull	80–77	Yeo (16)	Espinas, Williams (10)	Williams (4)	Araneta Coliseum	5–3
10	November 28	Purefoods	63–68	Williams (16)	Williams (16)	Williams, Reyes (5)	Surigao del Norte	5–4

December

Game	Date	Opponent	Score	High points	High rebounds	High assists	Location Attendance	Record
11	December 4	San Miguel	94–110	Omolon (20)	Williams (15)	Reyes (6)	Araneta Coliseum	5–5
12	December 11	Coca Cola	98–92	Williams (23)	Williams (17)	Reyes (7)	Ynares Center	6–5
13	December 16	Barangay Ginebra	93–88	Urbiztondo (22)	Williams (19)	Reyes (7)	Araneta Coliseum	7–5
14	December 23	Talk 'N Text	112–117	Reyes (32)	Reyes (12)	Yeo (8)	Cuneta Astrodome	7–6

January

Game	Date	Opponent	Score	High points	High rebounds	High assists	Location Attendance	Record
15	January 6	Rain or Shine	95–91	Williams (25)	Williams (19)	Reyes (6)	Araneta Coliseum	8–6
16	January 8	Burger King	83–79	Yeo (31)	Williams (17)	Espinas (4)	Cuneta Astrodome	9–6
17	January 13	Alaska	77–85	Reyes, 2 others (14)	Williams (14)	Urbiztondo (8)	Araneta Coliseum	9–7
18	January 17	Barako Bull	108–86	Williams (25)	Williams (11)	Reyes (10)	Araneta Coliseum	10–7
19	January 22	Purefoods	78–88	Yeo (17)	Williams (16)	Yeo (5)	Ynares Center	10–8

2009–10 schedule

===== Playoffs =====
2010 PBA Philippine Cup playoffs game log
Wildcard

Game	Date	Opponent	Score	High points	High rebounds	High assists	Location Attendance	Record
1	January 24	Rain or Shine	86–90	Williams (27)	Williams (18)	Reyes (8)	Ynares Center	0–1

2009–10 schedule

== Fiesta Conference ==
=== Eliminations ===
==== Standings ====
Pos	Team	W	L	PCT	GB	Qualification
1	Talk 'N Text Tropang Texters	15	3	.833	—	Advance to semifinals
2	San Miguel Beermen	13	5	.722 (Note: Second seed playoff: San Miguel 88, Derby Ace 83)	2	Advance to semifinals
3	Derby Ace Llamados	13	5	.722	2	Advance to quarterfinals
4	Alaska Aces	11	7	.611	4	Advance to quarterfinals
5	Barangay Ginebra Kings	9	9	.500 (Note: Fifth seed playoff: Barangay Ginebra 115, Rain or Shine 88)	6	Advance to quarterfinals
6	Rain or Shine Elasto Painters	9	9	.500	6	Advance to wildcard round
7	Coca-Cola Tigers	8	10	.444	7	Advance to wildcard round
8	Sta. Lucia Realtors	5	13	.278	10	Advance to wildcard round
9	Air21 Express	4	14	.222	11	Advance to wildcard round
10	Barako Energy Coffee Masters	3	15	.167	12	

Source: PBA.ph

== Transactions ==
=== Pre-season ===
Sta. Lucia Realtors

Players Added

Via Draft

- Mark Benitez
- Charles Waters

Via Free Agency

- Jervy del Rosario
- Ardy Larong
- Chris Pacana (From Barangay Ginebra)
- Joshua Urbiztondo

Via Trade

- Jason Misolas (From Coca Cola)
Players Lost

Via Free Agency

- Christian Coronel
- Norman Gonzales (To Coca Cola)
- Melvin Mamaclay
- Dennis Miranda (To San Miguel)

Via Trade

- Dennis Espino (To Coca Cola)

=== Mid-season break ===
March 8, 2010	To Sta. Lucia Bonbon Custodio	To San Miguel Joseph Yeo

=== Fiesta Conference ===
May 14, 2010	To Sta. Lucia Ali Peek; Nic Belasco; Pong Escobal; Ogie Menor; Yousif Aljamal	To Talk 'N Text Ryan Reyes; Kelly Williams; Charles Waters	To Barako Energy Coffee Mark Isip; 2010 1st round pick from Talk 'N Text

==== Imports recruited ====
Team	Player	Debuted	Final
Sta. Lucia Realtors	Anthony Johnson (1/1)	March 21, 2010	July 4, 2010
