= 2011–12 PBA Philippine Cup finals =

Basketball cup finals

2011–2012 PBA Philippine Cup finals
Team	Coach	Wins
(2) Talk 'N Text	Chot Reyes	4
(8) Powerade	Bo Perasol	1
- Dates: January 20–29, 2012
- MVP: Larry Fonacier (Talk 'N Text)
- Television: AKTV on IBC
- Announcers: See broadcast notes
- Radio network: DZSR

Referees
- Game 1: R. Maurillo, J. Mariano, S. Pineda
- Game 2: J. Mariano, S. Pineda, E. Aquino
- Game 3: N. Quilinguen, P. Balao, E. Aquino
- Game 4: S. Pineda, R. Maurillo, J. Mariano
- Game 5: N. Quilinguen, P. Balao, R. Maurillo

PBA Philippine Cup finals chronology
- < 2010–11 2012–13 >

PBA finals chronology
- < 2011 Governors' 2012 Commissioner's >

The 2011–12 PBA Philippine Cup finals was the best-of-7 championship series of the 2011–12 PBA Philippine Cup, and the conclusion of the conference's playoffs. The Talk 'N Text Tropang Texters and the Powerade Tigers competed for the 104th championship contested by the league. The series was held from January 20 to 29, 2012.

This was the first time that Talk 'N Text and Powerade faced each other in the finals, since the 2003 PBA All-Filipino Cup, in which Talk 'N Text won the series in six games.

Talk 'N Text won the championship series, four games to one, becoming the third team, and first since 1985, to successfully defend the All-Filipino crown.

== Background ==
=== Road to the finals ===
Talk 'N Text		Powerade
Finished 10–4 (0.714): Tied for 1st*	Elimination round	Finished 6–8 (0.429): Tied for 7th*
−8	*Tiebreaker	−35
Def. Barako Bull, 81–79	Quarterfinals	Def. B-Meg, 97–88, 131–123
Def. Petron Blaze, 4–3	Semifinals	Def. Rain or Shine, 4–3

Talk 'N Text finished the elimination round tied with the B-Meg Llamados for first place. Since Talk 'N Text has an inferior quotient against B-Meg, the team got the #2 seed but still got the twice-to-beat advantage entering the quarterfinals. They defeated the 7th seeded Barako Bull Energy in one game in order to advance to the semifinals, where they faced the Petron Blaze Boosters, the team that they faced during the 2011 PBA Governors Cup finals and denied them their opportunity for a Grand Slam. Talk 'N Text defeated Petron Blaze in seven games, becoming the third team to win a best-of-seven playoff series coming from a 1–3 deficit.

Powerade on the other hand was seeded eight (due to an inferior quotient against Barako Bull), with a twice-to-beat disadvantage going to the quarterfinals. They defeated the first seeded B-Meg Llamados in two games to advance to the semifinals. In the next round, they faced the fifth-seeded Rain or Shine Elasto Painters. Powerade won in seven games, making them the first team in PBA history to become the lowest seeded team to advance to the finals.

== Series summary ==
Team	Game 1	Game 2	Game 3	Game 4	Game 5	Wins
Talk 'N Text	116	102	133	97	110	4
Powerade	100	96	126	100	101	1
Venue	Digos	Araneta	Araneta	Araneta	Araneta

=== Game 1 ===
AKTV

January 20
6:45 p.m.

Report

Talk 'N Text Tropang Texters 116, Powerade Tigers 100
Scoring by quarter: 38–21, 30–29, 28–31, 20–19
Pts: Castro 23; Rebs: Peek 7 Asts: Castro 8	Pts: Anthony 23; Rebs: Kramer 13; Asts: Anthony, Lingganay 5
Talk 'N Text leads series, 1–0

Davao del Sur Coliseum, Digos, Davao del Sur
Referees: R. Maurillo, J. Mariano, S. Pineda

In the first game, which is held at Digos, Davao del Sur, Talk 'N Text capitalized on the absence of Powerade's top pick rookie JV Casio, due to an injured knee, and limiting Gary David to only 19 points (his lowest scoring output in the playoffs) to get the first win of the series. The Tropang Texters led Powerade by as much as 20 points mostly in the second half.

=== Game 2 ===
AKTV

January 23
6:45 p.m.

Report

Talk 'N Text Tropang Texters 102, Powerade Tigers 96
Scoring by quarter: 31–25, 25–26, 24–22, 22–23
Pts: Alapag 23; Rebs: de Ocampo 15; Asts: Castro 5	Pts: David 30; Rebs: Kramer 10; Asts: Lassiter 5
Talk 'N Text leads series, 2–0

Smart Araneta Coliseum, Quezon City
Referees: J. Mariano, S. Pineda, E. Aquino

Talk 'N Text was in control most of the game and was leading Powerade by 12 points going into the fourth quarter. The Tigers, led by Doug Kramer sparked a 13–2 run, which pushed Powerade to within one point, 94–93 with 2:54 remaining in the game. After executing empty possessions, Larry Fonacier was able to score a layup from a broken play that gave the Tropang Texters with 2:08 remaining. Jimmy Alapag sealed any chance for a Powerade comeback with a 28-foot three point jumper.

=== Game 3 ===
AKTV

January 25
6:45 p.m.

Report

Talk 'N Text Tropang Texters 133, Powerade Tigers 126 (OT)
Scoring by quarter: 28–34, 35–26, 24–33, 34–28, Overtime: 12–5
Pts: Fonacier 25; Rebs: Peek 9 Asts: Alapag 11	Pts: David 36; Rebs: Kramer 23; Asts: Casio 11
Talk 'N Text leads series, 3–0

Smart Araneta Coliseum, Quezon City
Referees: N. Quilinguen, P. Balao, E. Aquino

With 3.3 seconds left in the game, and leading the game 121–118, Talk 'N Text had the possession and a chance to close the game. Ranidel de Ocampo miscalculated the lead pass to teammate Larry Fonacier, who was heavily defended by Gary David. JV Casio was able to pick up the loose ball then sank a three-point shot to send the game into overtime. During the overtime period, De Ocampo was able to make up his mistake in regulation, scoring the crucial shots in overtime, sealing the game and a commanding 3–0 lead in the finals series.

Earlier in the game, De Ocampo was slapped with a flagrant foul (penalty 1) after he swung an elbow to Sean Anthony after securing a rebound. Anthony's eyebrow needed 10 stitches to stop the bloody gash. De Ocampo was fined P20,000 by the commissioner's office after the incident.

=== Game 4 ===
AKTV

January 27
6:45 p.m.

Report

Talk 'N Text Tropang Texters 97, Powerade Tigers 100
Scoring by quarter: 23–25, 20–28, 32–22, 22–25
Pts: Fonacier 20; Rebs: Castro, Williams 10; Asts: Alapag, Reyes, 6	Pts: David 35; Rebs: Anthony 11; Asts: Casio 8
Talk 'N Text leads series, 3–1

Smart Araneta Coliseum, Quezon City
Referees: S. Pineda, R. Maurillo, J. Mariano

Before Game 4 started, Powerade's Gary David was named Best Player of the Conference after receiving 1268 value points against his closest contender Arwind Santos with 1159.

Scoring with a game-high 35 points, Gary David led Powerade to its first win in the series, amid costly miscues at the last minutes of the game, preventing a potential Talk 'N Text sweep.

=== Game 5 ===
AKTV

January 29
6:00 p.m.

Report

Talk 'N Text Tropang Texters 110, Powerade Tigers 101
Scoring by quarter: 30–16, 30–30, 25–18, 25–37
Pts: Reyes 20; Rebs: Peek, Reyes 8 Asts: Alapag, 2 others 6 Stls: Reyes 10	Pts: David 37; Rebs: Anthony 13; Asts: Casio 4 Stls: Casio 2
Talk 'N Text wins series, 4–1

Smart Araneta Coliseum, Quezon City
Referees: N. Quilinguen, P. Balao, R. Maurillo

Talk 'N Text led most of the game, leading with as much as 23 points (40–17) and prevented any scoring surge from Powerade. The Tropang Texters was able to secure the series clinching game, successfully defending the Philippine Cup, making them the first team in league history to win back-to-back All-Filipino championships after 27 years. The last team doing that feat was the Great Taste Coffee Makers in 1984 and 1985.

Ryan Reyes also made history by making 10 steals and breaking the all-time PBA record for most steals made in a single game.

After the game, Larry Fonacier was awarded as the finals Most Valuable Player by the PBA Press Corps.

== Rosters ==
Talk 'N Text Tropang Texters roster
Players
Coaches

Pos.	#	POB	Name	Height	Weight	DOB (YYYY–MM–DD)	From
PG	3	(United States)	Jimmy Alapag (C)	5 ft 9 in (1.75 m)	160 lb (73 kg)		Cal State San Bernardino
PF	4	(United States)	Harvey Carey	6 ft 3 in (1.91 m)	210 lb (95 kg)		Sonoma State
PG	5	(Philippines)	Magnum Membrere (IN)	5 ft 11 in (1.80 m)	170 lb (77 kg)		Ateneo
G/F	6	(Philippines)	Riego Gamalinda	6 ft 3 in (1.91 m)	184 lb (83 kg)		San Beda
G	10	(United States)	Ryan Reyes	6 ft 1 in (1.85 m)	190 lb (86 kg)		Cal State Fullerton
G/F	12	(Philippines)	Larry Fonacier	6 ft 2 in (1.88 m)	170 lb (77 kg)		Ateneo
PG	16	(Philippines)	John Raymundo (R)	5 ft 10 in (1.78 m)	170 lb (77 kg)		San Sebastian
G	17	(Philippines)	Jayson Castro	5 ft 11 in (1.80 m)	167 lb (76 kg)		Philippine Christian
C	18	(Philippines)	Gilbert Lao	6 ft 8 in (2.03 m)	210 lb (95 kg)		UST
F	20	(United States)	Jared Dillinger	6 ft 5 in (1.96 m)	220 lb (100 kg)		Hawaiʻi
F	21	(United States)	Kelly Williams	6 ft 7 in (2.01 m)	215 lb (98 kg)		Oakland
G	22	(United States)	Shawn Weinstein (IN)	6 ft 1 in (1.85 m)	180 lb (82 kg)		St. Edward's
PG	27	(Philippines)	Emmerson Oreta	6 ft 1 in (1.85 m)	180 lb (82 kg)		UST
PF	30	(United States)	Charles Waters (IN)	6 ft 3 in (1.91 m)	210 lb (95 kg)		Webster
F	33	(Philippines)	Ranidel De Ocampo	6 ft 6 in (1.98 m)	200 lb (91 kg)		Saint Francis of Assisi
F/C	34	(United States)	Ali Peek	6 ft 3 in (1.91 m)	240 lb (109 kg)		Saint Mary's
F/C	35	(Philippines)	Japeth Aguilar	6 ft 9 in (2.06 m)	225 lb (102 kg)		Western Kentucky
PF	40	(Philippines)	Rich Alvarez	6 ft 4 in (1.93 m)	200 lb (91 kg)		Ateneo
G/F	51	(Philippines)	Aaron Aban (injured)	6 ft 3 in (1.91 m)	200 lb (91 kg)		Letran

Head coach

- (Philippines) Chot Reyes (Ateneo)

Assistant coach(es)

- (Philippines) Jamike Jarin (Ateneo)
- (Philippines) Nash Racela (Ateneo)
- (Philippines) Joshua Reyes

Legend

- (C) Team captain
- (CI) Commissioner's Cup Import
- (GI) Governors' Cup Import
- (EI) EASL Import
- (DP) Unsigned draft pick
- (FA) Free agent
- (IN) Inactive
- (S) Suspended
- (R) Rookie
- Injured

Powerade Tigers roster
Players
Coaches

Pos.	#	POB	Name	Height	Weight	DOB (YYYY–MM–DD)	From
PG	1	(Philippines)	Celino Cruz	5 ft 9 in (1.75 m)	170 lb (77 kg)		Far Eastern
G	3	(Philippines)	James Martinez (R)	5 ft 10 in (1.78 m)	170 lb (77 kg)		UE
PG	4	(Philippines)	Rudy Lingganay (R)	5 ft 10 in (1.78 m)	170 lb (77 kg)		UE
SF	8	(Philippines)	Francis Allera	6 ft 4 in (1.93 m)	180 lb (82 kg)		UST
SF	10	(Canada)	Sean Anthony	6 ft 4 in (1.93 m)	200 lb (91 kg)		McGill
G/F	13	(United States)	Marcio Lassiter (R)	6 ft 2 in (1.88 m)	185 lb (84 kg)		Cal State Fullerton
C	17	(Philippines)	Rommel Adducul	6 ft 6 in (1.98 m)	225 lb (102 kg)		San Sebastian
F/C	18	(Philippines)	Doug Kramer	6 ft 5 in (1.96 m)	210 lb (95 kg)		Ateneo
SG	20	(Philippines)	Gary David	6 ft 1 in (1.85 m)	180 lb (82 kg)		Lyceum
G/F	22	(United States)	Josh Vanlandingham	6 ft 4 in (1.93 m)	195 lb (88 kg)		Pacific Lutheran
F	24	(Philippines)	Ricky Calimag	6 ft 5 in (1.96 m)	210 lb (95 kg)		San Beda
PF	34	(United States)	William Antonio (C)	6 ft 3 in (1.91 m)	190 lb (86 kg)		Chaminade
PG	42	(Philippines)	JV Casio (R)	5 ft 10 in (1.78 m)	175 lb (79 kg)		De La Salle
C	43	(United States)	Alex Crisano	6 ft 7 in (2.01 m)	240 lb (109 kg)		Brooklyn

Head coach

- (Philippines) Bo Perasol (UP Diliman)

Assistant coach(es)

- (Philippines) George Ella (UE)
- (United States) Alex Compton (Cornell)
- (Philippines) Ricky Dandan (UP Diliman)
- (Philippines) Charles Tiu (Ateneo)

Legend

- (C) Team captain
- (CI) Commissioner's Cup Import
- (GI) Governors' Cup Import
- (EI) EASL Import
- (DP) Unsigned draft pick
- (FA) Free agent
- (IN) Inactive
- (S) Suspended
- (R) Rookie
- Injured

== Broadcast notes ==
Game	Play-by-play	Analyst	Courtside reporters	Studio game analysts
Game 1	Magoo Marjon	Rado Dimalibot	none	Mico Halili, Jason Webb and Richard del Rosario
Game 2	Chiqui Reyes	Quinito Henson	Aaron Atayde and Sel Guevara	Richard del Rosario, Jason Webb and Ryan Gregorio
Game 3	Magoo Marjon	Jason Webb and Ryan Gregorio	Aaron Atayde and Sel Guevara	Richard del Rosario, Dominic Uy and Willie Miller
Game 4	Mico Halili	Quinito Henson and Jong Uichico	Aaron Atayde and Sel Guevara	Richard del Rosario, Jason Webb, Willie Miller and Dorian Peña
Game 5	Magoo Marjon	Jason Webb and Ryan Gregorio	Aaron Atayde and Sel Guevara	Mico Halili, Richard del Rosario, Olsen Racela
