= 2009–10 Talk 'N Text Tropang Texters season =

- Head coach: Chot Reyes
- General Manager: Virgil Villavicencio
- Owner(s): Smart Communications (an MVP Group subsidiary)

Philippine Cup results
- Record: 13–10 (56.5%)
- Place: 5th
- Playoff finish: Quarterfinals (by Barangay Ginebra 3–2)

Fiesta Conference results
- Record: 19–7 (73.1%)
- Place: 1st
- Playoff finish: Semifinals (by Alaska 4–3)

Talk 'N Text Tropang Texters seasons

The 2009–10 Talk 'N Text Tropang Texters season was the 20th season of the franchise in the Philippine Basketball Association (PBA).

== Key dates ==
- August 2: The 2009 PBA Draft took place in Fort Bonifacio, Taguig.
- February 5: In Game Four of the best-of-five quarterfinal against Ginebra, to referees controversial call of flagrant foul penalty 2 against Ranidel de Ocampo, Chot Reyes led a walk-out of the team to the dugout. The game was resulted to forfeit and awarded to Ginebra. The Tropang Texters also penalized up to Php 1 Million.

== Notable occurrences ==
Due to formation of Smart Gilas program, general manager Frankie Lim was assigned to the program, while assistant Virgil Villavicencio was appointed to replace Lim.

== Draft picks ==
| Round | Pick | Player | Height | Position | Nationality | College |
|---|---|---|---|---|---|---|
| 2 | 19 | Kevin White | 5 ft. 10 in. | Point guard | United States | West Hills |

== Roster ==
2009–10 Talk 'N Text Tropang Texters roster
Players

| Pos. | # | POB | Name | Height | Weight | DOB (YYYY–MM–DD) | From |
|---|---|---|---|---|---|---|---|
| G | 3 | (United States) | Jimmy Alapag (C) | 5 ft 10 in (1.78 m) | 160 lb (73 kg) | | Cal State San Bernardino |
| F | 4 | (United States) | Harvey Carey | 6 ft 3 in (1.91 m) | 210 lb (95 kg) | | Sonoma State |
| G/F | 9 | (Philippines) | Mark Cardona | 6 ft 1 in (1.85 m) | 175 lb (79 kg) | | De La Salle |
| G | 10 | (United States) | Ryan Reyes | 6 ft 2 in (1.88 m) | 190 lb (86 kg) | | Cal State Fullerton |
| G | 17 | (Philippines) | Jayson Castro | 5 ft 11 in (1.80 m) | 167 lb (76 kg) | | Philippine Christian |
| G/F | 20 | (United States) | Jared Dillinger | 6 ft 5 in (1.96 m) | 220 lb (100 kg) | | Hawaiʻi |
| F | 21 | (United States) | Kelly Williams | 6 ft 7 in (2.01 m) | 215 lb (98 kg) | | Oakland |
| G | 27 | (Philippines) | Emmerson Oreta | 6 ft 2 in (1.88 m) | 180 lb (82 kg) | | UST |
| G/F | 28 | (Philippines) | Mark Yee | 6 ft 2 in (1.88 m) | 170 lb (77 kg) | | San Sebastian (Cavite) |
| F | 30 | (Philippines) | Charles Waters | 6 ft 4 in (1.93 m) | 220 lb (100 kg) | | Webster |
| F/C | 33 | (Philippines) | Ranidel de Ocampo | 6 ft 6 in (1.98 m) | 200 lb (91 kg) | | Saint Francis of Assisi |
| F/C | 48 | (Philippines) | J.R. Quiñahan | 6 ft 6 in (1.98 m) | 260 lb (118 kg) | | Visayas |
| G/F | 51 | (Philippines) | Aaron Aban | 6 ft 3 in (1.91 m) | 200 lb (91 kg) | | Letran |

Coaches
Head coach
- (Philippines) Chot Reyes (Ateneo)
Assistant(s)
- (Philippines) Aboy Castro (UP Diliman)
- (Philippines) Nash Racela (Ateneo)
- (Philippines) Bong Ravena (UE)
- (United States) Norman Black (Saint Joseph's)

Legend
- (DP) Unsigned draft pick
- (FA) Free agent
- (S) Suspended
- Injured

== Philippine Cup ==
=== Eliminations ===
==== Standings ====
| Pos | Team | W | L | PCT | GB | Qualification |
|---|---|---|---|---|---|---|
| 1 | Alaska Aces | 13 | 5 | .722 (Note: Head-to-head record: Alaska 2–0 San Miguel) | — | Advance to semifinals |
| 2 | San Miguel Beermen | 13 | 5 | .722 | — | Advance to semifinals |
| 3 | Purefoods Tender Juicy Giants | 12 | 6 | .667 (Note: Head-to-head record: Purefoods 1–1 Barangay Ginebra; Purefoods 0, Barangay Ginebra 0; overall point differential: Purefoods +85, Barangay Ginebra +75) | 1 | Advance to quarterfinals |
| 4 | Barangay Ginebra Kings | 12 | 6 | .667 | 1 | Advance to quarterfinals |
| 5 | Talk 'N Text Tropang Texters | 11 | 7 | .611 | 2 | Advance to quarterfinals |
| 6 | Sta. Lucia Realtors | 10 | 8 | .556 | 3 | Advance to wildcard round |
| 7 | Coca-Cola Tigers | 6 | 12 | .333 (Note: Head-to-head record: Burger King 1–1, Coca-Cola; Burger King +10, Coca-Cola −10) | 7 | Advance to wildcard round |
| 8 | Burger King Whoppers | 6 | 12 | .333 | 7 | Advance to wildcard round |
| 9 | Rain or Shine Elasto Painters | 4 | 14 | .222 | 9 | Advance to wildcard round |
| 10 | Barako Bull Energy Boosters | 3 | 15 | .167 | 10 | |
| — | Smart Gilas (G) | 3 | 6 | .333 | 5.5 | Guest team (Note: Smart Gilas's results do not count in the standings.) |

Source: PBA.ph
(G) Guests

==== Game log ====
===== Eliminations =====
2010 PBA Philippine Cup game log
October

| Game | Date | Opponent | Score | High points | High rebounds | High assists | Location Attendance | Record |
|---|---|---|---|---|---|---|---|---|
| 1 | October 16 | Rain or Shine | 85–76 | Cardona (16) | Carey (11) | Alapag (9) | Araneta Coliseum | 1–0 |
| 2 | October 21 | Smart Gilas* | 103–73 | Cardona (16) | Peek (10) | Alapag (6) | Cuneta Astrodome | |
| 3 | October 25 | Sta. Lucia | 100–83 | Cardona (25) | Belasco (9) | Alapag (9) | Araneta Coliseum | 2–0 |
| 4 | October 28 | San Miguel | 90–100 | Alapag (22) | Cardona, 3 others (5) | Alapag (5) | Araneta Coliseum | 2–1 |

November

| Game | Date | Opponent | Score | High points | High rebounds | High assists | Location Attendance | Record |
|---|---|---|---|---|---|---|---|---|
| 5 | November 8 | Purefoods | 102–108 | Carey (20) | Y. de Ocampo, Peek (7) | Cardona, Alapag (5) | Araneta Coliseum | 2–2 |
| 6 | November 11 | Coca Cola | 103–94 | Cardona (35) | Belasco (10) | Cardona (4) | Araneta Coliseum | 3–2 |
| 7 | November 13 | Barako Bull | 93–90 | Alapag (25) | Peek (15) | Alapag, Cardona (5) | Ynares Center | 4–2 |
| 8 | November 20 | Alaska | 106–110 | R. de Ocampo (16) | Carey (10) | R. de Ocampo, Castro (5) | Araneta Coliseum | 4–3 |
| 9 | November 25 | Barangay Ginebra | 87–72 | Dillinger (18) | Dillinger (18) | Alapag (9) | Araneta Coliseum | 5–3 |
| 10 | November 27 | Burger King | 118–105 | Cardona (40) | Cardona (11) | Cardona, 2 others (4) | Ynares Center | 6–3 |

December

| Game | Date | Opponent | Score | High points | High rebounds | High assists | Location Attendance | Record |
|---|---|---|---|---|---|---|---|---|
| 11 | December 2 | Rain or Shine | 93–95 | Peek, Carey (14) | R. de Ocampo (11) | Alapag (5) | Araneta Coliseum | 6–4 |
| 12 | December 5 | Coca Cola | 107–104 | Cardona (21) | Carey (14) | Cardona (8) | General Santos | 7–4 |
| 13 | December 11 | Burger King | 115–104 | Cardona (32) | Carey (14) | Castro (10) | Ynares Center | 8–4 |
| 14 | December 16 | Alaska | 119–113 (OT) | Cardona (31) | Carey (14) | Castro (13) | Araneta Coliseum | 8–5 |
| 15 | December 19 | Purefoods | 101–98 | Alapag (17) | Carey (10) | Carey, Castro (4) | Araneta Coliseum | 9–5 |
| 16 | December 23 | Sta. Lucia | 117–112 | Cardona (34) | Peek (12) | Cardona, Castro (5) | Cuneta Astrodome | 10–5 |

January

| Game | Date | Opponent | Score | High points | High rebounds | High assists | Location Attendance | Record |
|---|---|---|---|---|---|---|---|---|
| 17 | January 6 | Barangay Ginebra | 82–105 | Alapag (17) | Carey (9) | Castro (6) | Araneta Coliseum | 10–6 |
| 18 | January 10 | Barako Bull | 97–99 | Alapag (21) | R. de Ocampo, Carey (12) | Cardona (4) | Araneta Coliseum | 10–7 |
| 19 | January 16 | San Miguel | 93–91 | Cardona (26) | Carey (10) | Alapag (4) | Zamboanga City | 11–7 |

2009–10 schedule

===== Playoffs =====
2010 PBA Philippine Cup playoffs game log
Quarterfinals

| Game | Date | Opponent | Score | High points | High rebounds | High assists | Location Attendance | Record |
|---|---|---|---|---|---|---|---|---|
| 1 | January 29 | Barangay Ginebra | 107–92 | Castro (20) | Carey (13) | Cardona (7) | Araneta Coliseum | 1–0 |
| 2 | January 31 | Barangay Ginebra | 106–105 | Castro (19) | R. de Ocampo (13) | R. de Ocampo (3) | Araneta Coliseum | 2–0 |
| 3 | February 3 | Barangay Ginebra | 97–102 | Cardona (18) | Peek, Carey (9) | Alapag (7) | Araneta Coliseum | 2–1 |
| 4 | February 5 | Barangay Ginebra | 20–27 (by forfeit) | n/a | n/a | n/a | Araneta Coliseum | 2–2 |
| 5 | February 7 | Barangay Ginebra | 100–113 | | | | Araneta Coliseum | 2–3 |

2009–10 schedule

== Fiesta Conference ==
=== Eliminations ===
==== Standings ====
| Pos | Team | W | L | PCT | GB | Qualification |
|---|---|---|---|---|---|---|
| 1 | Talk 'N Text Tropang Texters | 15 | 3 | .833 | — | Advance to semifinals |
| 2 | San Miguel Beermen | 13 | 5 | .722 (Note: Second seed playoff: San Miguel 88, Derby Ace 83) | 2 | Advance to semifinals |
| 3 | Derby Ace Llamados | 13 | 5 | .722 | 2 | Advance to quarterfinals |
| 4 | Alaska Aces | 11 | 7 | .611 | 4 | Advance to quarterfinals |
| 5 | Barangay Ginebra Kings | 9 | 9 | .500 (Note: Fifth seed playoff: Barangay Ginebra 115, Rain or Shine 88) | 6 | Advance to quarterfinals |
| 6 | Rain or Shine Elasto Painters | 9 | 9 | .500 | 6 | Advance to wildcard round |
| 7 | Coca-Cola Tigers | 8 | 10 | .444 | 7 | Advance to wildcard round |
| 8 | Sta. Lucia Realtors | 5 | 13 | .278 | 10 | Advance to wildcard round |
| 9 | Air21 Express | 4 | 14 | .222 | 11 | Advance to wildcard round |
| 10 | Barako Energy Coffee Masters | 3 | 15 | .167 | 12 | |

Source: PBA.ph

== Transactions ==
=== Pre-season ===
Talk 'N Text Tropang Texters

Players Added

Via Draft

- Kevin White

Via Free Agency

- Yousif Aljamal
- Jonathan de Guzman
- Emmerson Oreta

Via Trade

- Nic Belasco (From Coca-Cola)
Players Lost

Via Free Agency

- Yousif Aljamal (To Barako Bull)
- Gec Chia
- Gilbert Lao (To Barako Bull)
- Kevin White (To Barangay Ginebra)

=== Philippine Cup ===
==== Trades ====
| October 12, 2009 | To Burger King 4 first round picks from Barako Bull (2010, 2012) and Talk 'N Text (2013 and 2014). Cash considerations | To Barako Bull Orlando Daroya | To Talk 'N Text Japeth Aguilar |

==== Subtractions ====
| Player | Left | Team |
| Japeth Aguilar | October 12 | inactive list (loaned to Smart Gilas) |

=== Mid-season break ===
==== Trades ====
| March 3, 2010 | To Air21 Yancy de Ocampo; Renren Ritualo | To Talk 'N Text JR Quiñahan; Mark Yee; Aaron Aban |

=== Fiesta Conference ===
==== Trades ====
| May 14, 2010 | To Sta. Lucia Ali Peek; Nic Belasco; Pong Escobal; Ogie Menor; Yousif Aljamal | To Talk 'N Text Ryan Reyes; Kelly Williams; Charles Waters | To Barako Energy Coffee Mark Isip; 2010 1st round pick from Talk 'N Text |

==== Imports recruited ====
| Team | Player | Debuted | Final |
|---|---|---|---|
| Talk 'N Text Tropang Texters | Shawn Daniels (1/1) | March 21, 2010 | August 6, 2010 |
