= 2012–13 PBA Philippine Cup finals =

Basketball cup finals

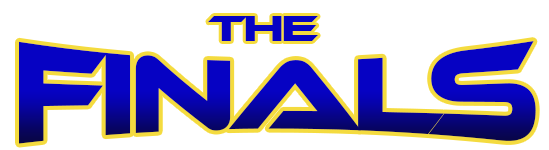
Team	Coach	Wins
(1) Talk 'N Text Tropang Texters	Norman Black	4
(3) Rain or Shine Elasto Painters	Yeng Guiao	0
- Dates: January 9–16, 2013
- MVP: Ranidel de Ocampo (Talk 'N Text Tropang Texters)
- Television: AKTV on IBC
- Announcers: See broadcast notes
- Radio network: DZSR

Referees
- Game 1: E. Aquino, R. Yante, R. Gruta
- Game 2: R. Maurillo, R. Yante, R. Gruta
- Game 3: R. Maurillo, R. Yante, E. Tankion
- Game 4: E. Aquino, S. Pineda, E. Tankion

PBA Philippine Cup finals chronology
- < 2011–12 2013–14 >

PBA finals chronology
- < 2012 Governors' 2013 Commissioner's >

The 2012–13 Philippine Basketball Association (PBA) Philippine Cup finals was the best-of-7 championship series of the 2012–13 PBA Philippine Cup, and the conclusion of the conference's playoffs. The Talk 'N Text Tropang Texters and the Rain or Shine Elasto Painters competed for the 107th championship contested by the league.

Talk 'N Text defeated Rain or Shine by sweeping the series, 4–0 and winning their third consecutive Philippine Cup. The Tropang Texters will also have permanent possession of the Jun Bernardino Trophy, which is awarded to the champions of the tournament since the 2006–07 season.

== Background ==
=== Road to the finals ===
Talk 'N Text		Rain or Shine
Finished 12–2 (0.857): 1st	Elimination round	Finished 9–5 (0.643): 3rd
Def. Air21, 105–100 (twice-to-beat advantage)	Quarterfinals	Def. Barangay Ginebra, 2–1 (best-of-three series)
Def. Alaska, 4–2	Semifinals	Def. San Mig Coffee, 4–2

=== Head-to-head matchup ===
The lone conference head-to-head matchup of the two teams was won by Talk 'N Text.

October 27, 2012

recap

Talk 'N Text Tropang Texters 80, Rain or Shine Elasto Painters 77

Victorias City, Negros Occidental

== Series summary ==
Team	Game 1	Game 2	Game 3	Game 4	Wins
Talk 'N Text	87	89	89	105	4
Rain or Shine	81	81	80	82	0
Venue	Araneta	MOA	Araneta	Araneta

=== Game 1 ===
AKTV on IBC

January 9
6:45 p.m.

Boxscore

Talk 'N Text Tropang Texters 87, Rain or Shine Elasto Painters 81
Scoring by quarter: 24–15, 27–24, 20–19, 16–23
Pts: Castro, de Ocampo 16; Rebs: Williams 12; Asts: Alapag 6	Pts: Cruz 13; Rebs: Cruz 9 Asts: Ibañes, Rodriguez 3
Talk 'N Text leads series, 1–0

Smart Araneta Coliseum, Quezon City
Attendance: 14,065
Referees: E. Aquino, R. Yante, R. Gruta

=== Game 2 ===
AKTV on IBC

January 11
6:45 p.m.

Boxscore

Talk 'N Text Tropang Texters 89, Rain or Shine Elasto Painters 81
Scoring by quarter: 23–15, 21–20, 19–28, 26–18
Pts: de Ocampo 24; Rebs: de Ocampo 9 Asts: Alapag, de Ocampo, 4	Pts: Quiñahan 16; Rebs: Lee 9 Asts: Lee 4
Talk 'N Text leads series, 2–0

Mall of Asia Arena, Pasay
Attendance: 11,500
Referees: R. Maurillo, R. Yante, R. Gruta

=== Game 3 ===
AKTV on IBC

January 13
6:00 p.m.

Boxscore

Talk 'N Text Tropang Texters 89, Rain or Shine Elasto Painters 80
Scoring by quarter: 22–20, 20–19, 19–26, 28–15
Pts: Castro 19; Rebs: Carey, Reyes, Williams 8 Asts: Alapag, Castro 4	Pts: Tiu 14; Rebs: Belga 9 Asts: Norwood 4
Talk 'N Text leads series, 3–0

Smart Araneta Coliseum, Quezon City
Attendance: 16,028
Referees: R. Maurillo, R. Yante, E. Tankion

=== Game 4 ===
AKTV on IBC

January 16
6:45 p.m.

Boxscore

Talk 'N Text Tropang Texters 105, Rain or Shine Elasto Painters 82
Scoring by quarter: 29–15, 24–31, 17–17, 35–19
Pts: de Ocampo 19; Rebs: Williams 11; Asts: Alapag 8	Pts: Rodriguez 16; Rebs: Norwood 10; Asts: Chan 4
Talk 'N Text wins series, 4–0

Smart Araneta Coliseum, Quezon City
Attendance: 17,136
Referees: E. Aquino, S. Pineda, E. Tankion

== Rosters ==
Talk 'N Text Tropang Texters roster
Players
Coaches

Pos.	#	POB	Name	Height	Weight	DOB (YYYY–MM–DD)	From
PG	3	(United States)	Jimmy Alapag (C)	5 ft 8 in (1.73 m)	160 lb (73 kg)		Cal State San Bernardino
PF	4	(United States)	Harvey Carey	6 ft 3 in (1.91 m)	210 lb (95 kg)		Sonoma State
G/F	6	(Philippines)	Riego Gamalinda	6 ft 3 in (1.91 m)	184 lb (83 kg)		San Beda
G	10	(United States)	Ryan Reyes	6 ft 1 in (1.85 m)	190 lb (86 kg)		Cal State Fullerton
G/F	12	(Philippines)	Larry Fonacier	6 ft 2 in (1.88 m)	170 lb (77 kg)		Ateneo
PG	16	(Philippines)	John Raymundo	5 ft 10 in (1.78 m)	170 lb (77 kg)		San Sebastian
G	17	(Philippines)	Jayson Castro	5 ft 10 in (1.78 m)	167 lb (76 kg)		Philippine Christian
C	18	(Philippines)	Gilbert Lao	6 ft 8 in (2.03 m)	210 lb (95 kg)		UST
G/F	20	(United States)	Jared Dillinger	6 ft 5 in (1.96 m)	220 lb (100 kg)		Hawaiʻi
F	21	(United States)	Kelly Williams	6 ft 7 in (2.01 m)	215 lb (98 kg)		Oakland
PF	22	(Philippines)	John Ferriols	6 ft 4 in (1.93 m)	205 lb (93 kg)		USJ–R
G	27	(Philippines)	Emmerson Oreta	6 ft 1 in (1.85 m)	180 lb (82 kg)		UST
F	33	(Philippines)	Ranidel De Ocampo	6 ft 5 in (1.96 m)	200 lb (91 kg)		Saint Francis of Assisi
F/C	34	(United States)	Ali Peek	6 ft 4 in (1.93 m)	240 lb (109 kg)		Saint Mary's
F	40	(Japan)	Rich Alvarez	6 ft 4 in (1.93 m)	200 lb (91 kg)		Ateneo
SF	51	(Philippines)	Aaron Aban	6 ft 3 in (1.91 m)	200 lb (91 kg)		Letran

Head coach

- (United States) Norman Black (Saint Joseph's)

Assistant coach(es)

- (Philippines) Nash Racela (Ateneo)
- (Philippines) Alexander Arespacochaga
- (Philippines) Gene Afable
- (Philippines) Joshua Reyes
- (Philippines) Jamike Jarin (Ateneo)

Team manager

- (Philippines) Aboy Castro

Legend

- (C) Team captain
- (CI) Commissioner's Cup Import
- (GI) Governors' Cup Import
- (EI) EASL Import
- (DP) Unsigned draft pick
- (FA) Free agent
- (IN) Inactive
- (S) Suspended
- (R) Rookie
- Injured

Roster

Rain or Shine Elasto Painters roster
Players
Coaches

Pos.	#	POB	Name	Height	Weight	DOB (YYYY–MM–DD)	From
G	1	(United States)	Jonathan Uyloan	6 ft 0 in (1.83 m)	185 lb (84 kg)		Golden West
G	3	(Philippines)	Paul Lee	6 ft 0 in (1.83 m)	200 lb (91 kg)		UE
PF	5	(Philippines)	Larry Rodriguez	6 ft 4 in (1.93 m)	200 lb (91 kg)		PMI
SF	6	(Philippines)	Jireh Ibañes (C)	6 ft 1 in (1.85 m)	182 lb (83 kg)		UP Diliman
G	10	(United States)	Gabe Norwood	6 ft 5 in (1.96 m)	210 lb (95 kg)		George Mason
PG	11	(Philippines)	Tyrone Tang	5 ft 7 in (1.70 m)	155 lb (70 kg)		De La Salle
G/F	16	(Philippines)	Jeffrei Chan	6 ft 3 in (1.91 m)	170 lb (77 kg)		Far Eastern
G	17	(Philippines)	Chris Tiu (R)	5 ft 11 in (1.80 m)	175 lb (79 kg)		Ateneo
SG	18	(Philippines)	Ryan Araña	6 ft 1.25 in (1.86 m)	180 lb (82 kg)		De La Salle
F/C	20	(Philippines)	Jervy Cruz	6 ft 5 in (1.96 m)	220 lb (100 kg)		UST
G/F	21	(Philippines)	Chito Jaime	6 ft 4 in (1.93 m)	200 lb (91 kg)		AMA
C	30	(Philippines)	Beau Belga	6 ft 6 in (1.98 m)	285 lb (129 kg)		Philippine Christian
SF	33	(Philippines)	Ronnie Matias	6 ft 4 in (1.93 m)	184 lb (83 kg)		Manila
F/C	48	(Philippines)	J.R. Quiñahan	6 ft 6 in (1.98 m)	225 lb (102 kg)		Visayas

Head coach

- (Philippines) Yeng Guiao (UP Diliman)

Assistant coach(es)

- (Philippines) Caloy Garcia (St. Benilde)
- (Philippines) Mike Buendia
- (Philippines) Jay Legacion
- (Philippines) Matthew Makalintal

Team manager

- (Philippines) Andy Jao

Legend

- (C) Team captain
- (CI) Commissioner's Cup Import
- (GI) Governors' Cup Import
- (EI) EASL Import
- (DP) Unsigned draft pick
- (FA) Free agent
- (IN) Inactive
- (S) Suspended
- (R) Rookie
- Injured

Roster

== Broadcast notes ==
Game	Play-by-play	Analyst(s)	Courtside reporters	AKTV Center Analysts
Game 1	Magoo Marjon	Jason Webb	Jessica Mendoza and Erika Padilla	Mico Halili, Richard del Rosario and Topex Robinson
Game 2	Mico Halili	Quinito Henson	Sel Guevara and Erika Padilla	Aaron Atayde, Ronnie Magsanoc and Benjie Paras
Game 3	Magoo Marjon	Jason Webb	Sel Guevara and Jessica Mendoza	Mico Halili, Ronnie Magsanoc and Jojo Lastimosa
Game 4	Mico Halili	Quinito Henson	Sel Guevara and Erika Padilla	Benjie Paras, Ryan Gregorio and Jason Webb

- Additional Game 4 crew:
  - Trophy presentation: Aaron Atayde
  - Dugout interviewer: Erika Padilla
