= Nelbert Omolon =

Filipino basketball player (born 1980)

Personal information
- Born: June 30, 1980 (age 46) Talakag, Bukidnon, Philippines
- Listed height: 6 ft 4 in (1.93 m)
- Listed weight: 185 lb (84 kg)

Career information
- High school: Ateneo de Cagayan (Cagayan de Oro)
- College: PCU
- PBA draft: 2004: 1st round, 8th overall pick
- Drafted by: Sta. Lucia Realtors
- Playing career: 2004–2016
- Position: Small forward
- Number: 3, 7, 21

Career history
- 2004–2010: Sta. Lucia Realtors
- 2010–2012: Meralco Bolts
- 2012–2013: Air21 Express
- 2013–2014: Meralco Bolts
- 2014–2016: San Miguel Beermen

Career highlights
- 4× PBA champion (2007–08 Philippine, 2014–15 Philippine, 2015 Governors', 2015–16 Philippine); PBA Mythical Second Team (2008); PBA All-Defensive Team (2007); 2× PBA Blitz Game MVP (2005, 2006)

Nelbert "Bitoy" Omolon (born June 30, 1980) is a Filipino former professional basketball player in the Philippine Basketball Association (PBA). He was drafted 8th overall in the 2004 PBA draft.

== Early years ==
The youngest of three boys, Omolon was born and raised in Talakag, Bukidnon, 36 kilometers from Cagayan de Oro. He did not learn how to play when he was a kid. He never even liked the game until he grew from 5'7" as a high school freshman to 6'2" as junior. After realizing he had a future in basketball, he tried out for the Ateneo de Cagayan basketball varsity. He spent his senior year with Ateneo.

=== College career ===
Omolon had an offer to play for Southwestern University, but ended up playing for the PCU Dolphins instead. He played there for five years, but never won an NCAA championship.

== Professional career ==
=== Philippine Basketball League ===
After playing in PCU, he took his sneakers to the Philippine Basketball League where he suited up for Osaka-La Salle and ICTSI under coach Franz Pumaren and Welcoat under coach Leo Austria.

=== Philippine Basketball Association ===
==== Sta. Lucia Realtors (2004–2010) ====
Omolon joined the PBA after being drafted 8th overall by the Sta. Lucia Realtors in the 2004 PBA draft. Prior to the draft, he impressed scouts as he and Marc Pingris topped the vertical leaping test. His head coach Alfrancis Chua was hands-on with his development, as in his rookie season, he averaged 6.5 points, 4.5 rebounds and 20.9 minutes while shooting .447 from the floor and .578 from the line. He also competed in the Slam Dunk Contest during the 2004 All-Star Weekend.

In a win over the Air21 Express, Omolon had a game-winning steal. He could have also made the game-winning layup, but he missed it and his teammate Chester Tolomia put it back in for the game-winning bucket. He also had a season-high 30-point game. That season, he raised his numbers to 8.1 points and 5.2 rebounds, but Sta. Lucia failed to make the 2006 Philippine Cup playoffs.

During the 2006–07 Philippine Cup, Omolon had a double-double of 16 points and 12 rebounds in a win over Air21. He then scored 16 of his 18 points in the fourth quarter of a win over the Coca-Cola Tigers. He scored 16 points once again in a win over the Welcoat Dragons. In their quarterfinals berth playoff against Air21, he grabbed six rebounds, and helped limit Ranidel de Ocampo to nine points, way below his 16.6 clip, as Sta. Lucia advanced to the playoffs.

Omolon scored a personal high 40 points on 11-of-16 shooting in the two-point area and hitting 4-of-5 beyond the arc with nine boards as Sta. Lucia earned its first ever outright semifinals slot on January 13, 2008, with a 123–106 rout over Air21. He would continue to contribute to the team in their playoff run, and Sta. Lucia won the 2007–08 Philippine Cup over the Purefoods Chunkee Giants. He was later selected to the Mythical Second Team that season.

In a win over the Talk 'N Text Tropang Texters during the 2008–09 Philippine Cup, Omolon scored all 24 points in the second half. He then scored 28 points in a win over Coca-Cola. He hit his season-high in a quarterfinal win over the Rain or Shine Elasto Painters with 30 points. He then had a slump in the playoffs until he scored 25 points in a semifinal win over the Alaska Aces. Sta. Lucia eventually fell to Alaska in six games. In the Fiesta Conference, he couldn't play for a while due to chickenpox.

During the 2009–10 Philippine Cup, Omolon made two clutch free throws in an overtime win over the Barako Bull Energy Boosters, which featured the lowest-scoring overtime game in six years. In a loss to the San Miguel Beermen, he scored 20 points, with 14 coming in the first half.

==== Meralco Bolts (2010–12) ====
In the 2010 offseason, Manila Electric Company (also known as Meralco) bought the Sta. Lucia Realty franchise for P50 million. With a team renamed to the Meralco Bolts, they made their debut in the 2010–11 Philippine Cup with a win over Barangay Ginebra. In that win, he had 14 points, 14 rebounds, and two assists. They were able to make it to the quarterfinals in their first conference.

==== Air21 Express (2012–13) ====
In January 2012, Omolon was traded for the first time in his career to the Air21 Express from the Meralco Bolts along with Mark Isip in exchange for Dennis Daa, Mark Canlas and a draft pick that originally belonged to the Bolts. In a 2012 Commissioner's Cup win over previously unbeaten Talk 'N Text, he had an impressive statline of 23 points, 14 rebounds and four blocks. In a loss to the Powerade Tigers, he led the locals with 17 points.

In the 2012–13 Philippine Cup, Omolon contributed 11 points in a win over the Petron Blaze Boosters. He then scored 12 points in a loss to Ginebra. In a Commissioner's Cup win over the GlobalPort Batang Pier, he had a season-high 13 points.

==== Return to Meralco (2013–14) ====
In 2013, Omolon and Rabeh Al-Hussaini were sent to Meralco in a three-team trade. He only got to play two games for Meralco in his return there.

==== San Miguel Beermen (2014–16) ====
On September 12, 2014, Nelbert Omolon was signed up by the San Miguel Beermen as the 13th man in the Beermen's roster. He went on to become a backup frontcourt player for them and win three of his four PBA championships in his time with the Beermen, including the historic comeback against Alaska in which they were down 0–3. Before the start of the 2016–17 season, he retired from professional basketball.

== PBA career statistics ==
=== Season-by-season averages ===
| Year | Team | GP | MPG | FG% | 3P% | FT% | RPG | APG | SPG | BPG | PPG |
|---|---|---|---|---|---|---|---|---|---|---|---|
| 2004–05 | Sta. Lucia | 51 | 21.0 | .447 | .196 | .578 | 4.5 | .7 | 1.3 | .6 | 6.5 |
| 2005–06 | Sta. Lucia | 36 | 20.4 | .489 | .222 | .598 | 4.6 | .7 | 1.3 | .9 | 8.1 |
| 2006–07 | Sta. Lucia | 46 | 23.7 | .509 | .205 | .632 | 5.8 | .9 | 1.2 | .7 | 10.4 |
| 2007–08 | Sta. Lucia | 54 | 27.8 | .494 | .349 | .699 | 5.3 | .8 | 1.2 | .6 | 12.4 |
| 2008–09 | Sta. Lucia | 40 | 27.1 | .451 | .319 | .667 | 5.5 | 1.4 | 1.0 | .5 | 9.9 |
| 2009–10 | Sta. Lucia | 38 | 21.6 | .369 | .269 | .597 | 3.8 | .6 | .4 | .5 | 6.1 |
| 2010–11 | Meralco | 24 | 26.1 | .423 | .200 | .551 | 5.5 | .6 | .8 | .3 | 6.8 |
| 2011–12 | Meralco | 34 | 19.6 | .478 | .286 | .692 | 3.8 | .7 | .7 | .3 | 7.2 |
| 2012–13 | Air21 | 35 | 17.3 | .430 | .192 | .722 | 3.1 | .6 | .5 | .2 | 4.7 |
| 2013–14 | Meralco | 2 | 8.5 | .750 | .000 | .000 | 2.0 | 1.0 | .0 | .0 | 3.0 |
| 2014–15 | San Miguel | 32 | 6.6 | .380 | .100 | .833 | 1.6 | .3 | .1 | .2 | 1.4 |
| 2015–16 | San Miguel | 9 | 5.0 | .400 | .000 | .000 | .9 | .0 | .1 | .0 | .9 |
| Career | | 401 | 21.1 | .461 | .273 | .643 | 4.4 | .7 | .9 | .5 | 7.5 |

== National team career ==
In 2003, Omolon joined an RP team backed by Cebuana Lhuillier for that year's ABC Championship (the precursor to what is now known as the FIBA Asia Cup). That team finished second to last in the tournament.

== Player profile ==
A player who was ever reliable on both ends of the floor due to his unrelenting defense and efficient offense, Omolon continued to impress his coaches in the pro leagues. He gained a reputation in college as an athletic finisher and defender. He was a player who was always tasked to guard the opposing team's best player and even imports. Although possessing a limited array of offensive moves, he showed that he does well on offense, as he once scored 40 points. He improved his outside shot, which allowed him to provide a complementary role.
