= Kelly Williams =

Filipino-American basketball player (born 1982)

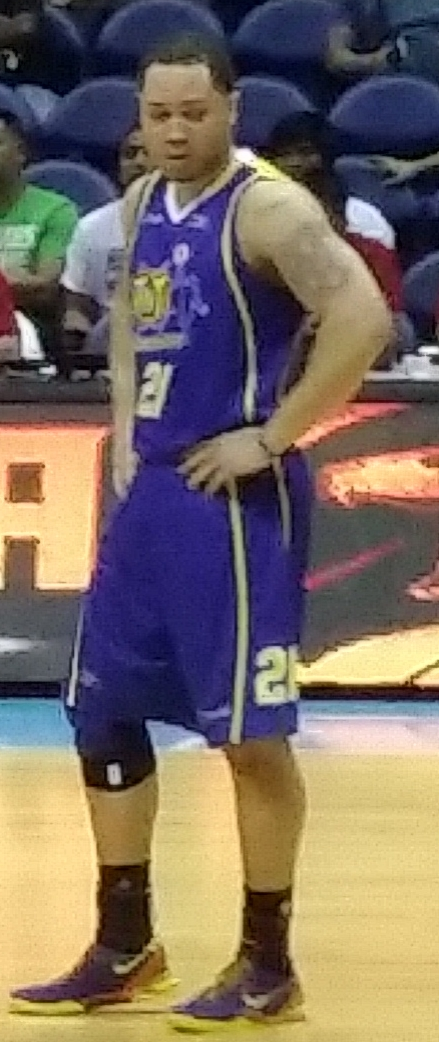
- Williams with the TNT Tropang Texters in 2015

No. 21 – TNT Tropang 5G
- Position: Power forward / center
- League: PBA

Personal information
- Born: February 7, 1982 (age 44) Detroit, Michigan, U.S.
- Listed height: 6 ft 7 in (2.01 m)
- Listed weight: 215 lb (98 kg)

Career information
- High school: Martin Luther King (Detroit, Michigan)
- College: Oakland (2000–2004)
- PBA draft: 2006: 1st round1st overall
- Drafted by: Sta. Lucia Realtors
- Playing career: 2006–2019, 2021–present

Career history
- 2006–2010: Sta. Lucia Realtors
- 2010–2019, 2021–present: TNT Tropang 5G

Career highlights
- 10× PBA champion (2007–08 Philippine, 2010–11 Philippine, 2011 Commissioner's, 2011–12 Philippine, 2012–13 Philippine, 2015 Commissioner's, 2021 Philippine, 2023 Governors', 2024 Governors', 2024–25 Commissioner's); PBA Most Valuable Player (2008); PBA Best Player of the Conference (2007–08 Philippine); 5× PBA All-Star (2007–2011); 3× PBA Mythical First Team (2007, 2008, 2011); 4× PBA Mythical Second Team (2009, 2010, 2012, 2017); 2× PBA All-Defensive Team (2008, 2021); PBA Rookie of the Year (2007); PBA All-Rookie Team (2007); 50 Greatest Players in PBA History (2015 selection); 2× PBA Comeback Player of the Year (2010, 2017); 2× PBA Slam Dunk Contest champion (2008, 2011); PBL champion (2005–06 Heroes); PBL Finals MVP (2005–06 Heroes); 2× PBL Mythical First Team (2005–06 Heroes, 2006 Unity)

Kelly Williams (born February 7, 1982) is a Filipino-American professional basketball player for the TNT Tropang 5G in the PBA. He played collegiate basketball at Oakland University, an NCAA Division I school in the United States, and he also represented the Philippines in international competitions.

== Early life ==
Williams was born in Detroit, Michigan to an American father and a Filipina mother. He is the youngest of three children. His father died of cancer at the age of 69 when he was seven years old. He attended Martin Luther King High School where he played in the Detroit PSL basketball league.

As a senior, Williams was the co-captain of the team. He was named an all-district and all-state player as he averaged 35 points, 14 rebounds, four blocks, three steals, and two assists per contest. During that time, the Crusaders were ranked in the state as high as number one, and was only defeated in the semifinal round of the state championships.

Williams completed high school in 2000. During his four years, Martin Luther King had a 68–16 win-loss record. He also finished as a two-time all-league honoree.

== College career ==
Williams was recruited to play for De La Salle in the Philippines. He chose to stay close to home, and attended Oakland University for four years, with the highlight of his career coming in his freshman year when the Grizzlies upset the University of Michigan.

- 2000–2001: Williams scored 18 points in Oakland's upset of Michigan on November 17, 2000. As a rookie, he ranked among the team leaders in scoring (6th), rebounding (1st), assists (4th) and steals (3rd).
- 2001–2002: Williams played in every game for the Golden Grizzlies as a sophomore.
- 2002–2003: Williams played in every game for a third straight year for OU in 2002–2003, finishing third on the squad in rebounding.
- 2003–2004: Williams had a solid senior season, ranking among the team leaders in scoring (4th), rebounding (3rd), assists (4th) and steals (4th). He scored 14 points in a win over IPFW.

=== College statistics ===
Legend
GP	Games played	MPG	Minutes per game
FG%	Field-goal percentage	3P%	3-point field-goal percentage	FT%	Free-throw percentage
RPG	Rebounds per game	APG	Assists per game	SPG	Steals per game
BPG	Blocks per game	PPG	Points per game	**Bold**	Career high

Year	Team	GP	MPG	FG%	3P%	FT%	RPG	APG	SPG	BPG	PPG
2000–01	Oakland University	28	26.0	.341	**.321**	.678	**5.7**	1.71	.9	**.5**	5.6
2001–02	Oakland University	**30**	20.1	**.385**	.191	.645	4.0	.7	**1.8**	.2	3.6
2002–03	Oakland University	28	22.3	.370	.283	.645	4.4	1.1	.8	.2	3.8
2003–04	Oakland University	**30**	**27.0**	.352	.320	**.813**	3.8	**2.2**	1.2	.2	**5.7**

== Amateur career ==
After displaying skills in exhibition games with the Philippine Team, he caught the attention of Filipino basketball aficionados. Hence, he did not disappoint as he averaged 17.1 points and 12.8 rebounds during his stint with the Philippine Basketball League's (PBL) Magnolia. With him, Magnolia won the 2005–06 Heroes' Cup.

== Professional career ==
=== Sta. Lucia Realtors (2006–2010) ===
==== Rookie season ====
Williams then applied for the 2006 PBA Draft. When the Realtors took the first overall draft right, they did not hesitate to pick him over two-time UAAP MVP and Arwind Santos, who was later picked second overall by the Air21 Express. The decision shocked many fans, as Sta. Lucia used to have a no Fil-Am policy. Santos was also his teammate in their time in the PBL. During his rookie season, he normed averages of 17.3 points and 9.6 rebounds earning him the Rookie of the Year award, making him the second Realtor to do so after Jun Limpot in 1993. He defeated Santos for the award. His play also transformed Sta. Lucia, as they became known as one of the elites of the PBA.

==== Sophomore season ====
In his sophomore year, he improved his game immensely, helping his team win their second championship overall in the 2007–08 Philippine Cup against the Purefoods Tender Juicy Giants while also winning Best Player of the Conference over once again, Santos. The award made him the first Realtor to do so. That championship would turn out to be the franchise's last. He also won that season's Slam Dunk Contest and was an All-Star. He finished the season with the league's Most Valuable Player award, garnering 2,762 votes over Santos' 1,775, and also was named to the All-Defensive Team.

==== Life-threatening illness ====
During the 2008–09 Philippine Cup, Williams had a double-double of 17 points and 18 rebounds in a win over Red Bull. He missed some games after being poked in the eye by Jay-R Reyes of the Rain or Shine Elasto Painters. The team failed however to defend their Philippine Cup championship, as they finished in 3rd place. He was one of the candidates for that conference's Best Player award. During the 2009 All-Star Week, he was diagnosed with thrombocytopenia and was out for the remaining games of the entire conference and the All-Star game. He also was unable to defend his Slam Dunk title. With his absence, his team did not last long and was eliminated by the Burger King Whoppers before the semis.

==== Return to the court ====
The Realtors helped pay for Williams' treatment, despite it not being a work-related illness and with his contract expiring. He kept battling the disease and was eventually able to return to the court in the 2009–10 Philippine Cup. He scored 28 points in a win over Rain or Shine for his team to start 2–0. Against the Coca-Cola Tigers, he had 23 points and 17 rebounds. Once again, he faced Santos for Best Player of the Conference. For the week of January 4–10, he shared Player of the Week honors with J.C. Intal. Santos and Williams both lost the Best Player award to James Yap. Williams became an All-Star once again.

=== Talk N Text Franchise (2010–2019; 2021–present) ===
==== First conference ====
In the middle of 2010 PBA Fiesta Conference, Williams, along with teammates Ryan Reyes and Charles Walters, was traded to the Talk N Text Phone Pals for Ali Peek, Nic Belasco, Yousif Aljamal, and Ogie Menor. The deal was brought about by Sta. Lucia's financial problems. It also reunited him with Chot Reyes, who had brought him to the Philippines. Williams scored 13 points in his debut. He then shared Player of the Week honors with his teammate Jimmy Alapag. They were defeated by the Alaska Aces in the semifinals. He won his first Comeback Player of the Year Award that season for overcoming his health problems.

==== Chasing the Grand Slam and Philippine Cup dominance ====
In the 2010–11 Philippine Cup, the Tropang Texters secured the first seed. They defeated Rain or Shine in the first round. Williams and his team then defeated the B-Meg Derby Ace Llamados the following round. He faced off against Santos (who was now a member of the San Miguel Beermen) once again in the finals, and won over him once again. The Tropang Texters also won the Commissioner's Cup. During the 2011 All-Star Weekend, he regained his slam dunk title. In the 2011 Governors' Cup, the team had a chance to complete a rare Grand Slam. Santos however, derailed those plans, and defeated Talk N Text in the finals. Williams ended up on the Mythical First Team.

Williams, along with teammates Alapag and Ranidel de Ocampo, missed the first games of TnT for the 2011–12 season due to commitments to the national team. He returned to TnT against the Llamados. TnT went on to defend its Philippine Cup title. In the Commissioner's Cup playoffs, they faced Barako Bull in the semifinals. In Game 1, Williams fractured his cheek bone in a loss. Despite the injury, he played 24 minutes in Game 2 and contributed 12 points, eight rebounds, three assists, and three blocks in the win. The Tropang Texters eventually made it to the finals against the Llamados. In Game 7, he fouled Llamado import Denzel Bowles, sending him to the free-throw line. Bowles made both his free-throws, and the game went into overtime, where the Llamados outlasted the Tropang Texters and won the championship. During the 2012 All-Star Weekend, he could have defended his slam dunk title, but Talk n Text management pulled him and other of his teammates out of competing in their events so that they could rest as they had just been in the finals.

In the 2012–13 season, Williams and the Texters had a new coach, Norman Black, who was a champion coach with Ateneo in the UAAP. They got their first win together against the GlobalPort Batang Pier, but in that game, he got dunked on by Mark Yee. After the elimination round, he was once again in the running for Best Player of the Conference along with his teammate Jayson Castro and rival Arwind Santos. Talk N Text made it to the Philippine Cup finals once again by beating Alaska in the semis. In that series, they swept Rain or Shine in four games, with him finishing with 15 points and 11 rebounds in the deciding Game 4. This gave Talk N Text its third straight Philippine Cup championship. Castro beat him for Best Player of the conference.

==== Blood disorder strikes once again; decline in play ====
During the 2013 Commissioner's Cup, Williams took an indefinite leave of absence, as his thrombocytopenia came up again. It was during this time that he was out that he contemplated retirement as the blood disorder was taking a toll on him. Without him, the Texters still made it to the semifinals, but lost to Barangay Ginebra as injuries piled up.

Williams found better treatment in the US, and was able to play for the Texters for the 2013–14 PBA season. In an overtime win against the Aces, he had 18 points and 10 rebounds in 38 minutes, the longest he had played since returning. That season, the Texters lost to the San Mig Coffee Mixers in the Philippine Cup quarterfinals, the Commissioner's Cup finals, and in the Governors' Cup semifinals. San Mig won the Grand Slam that season. Williams however, saw a dip in his stats as he averaged lows of around seven points and six rebounds while playing 22 minutes.

In the 2014–15 Philippine Cup, Williams led his team to a win over the Kia Sorento with 13 points and 11 rebounds. During the season, he was named to the PBA's 40 Greatest Players. As the season went on, it became clear that he was a shell of himself. Still, he was able to win the 2015 Commissioner's Cup championship with Talk 'N Text. He was also able to make meaningful contributions to the team, such as when he scored 14 points while defending Kia's import Hamady N'Diaye to lead the Tropang Texters to the win.

==== Rising again ====
Before the start of the 2015–16 season, Williams made a deal with the Texters for a one-year P 5.04 million extension. He came back from an MCL injury he suffered with the national team in a Philippine Cup game against the NLEX Road Warriors. He then had six points and five rebounds in 12 minutes against the Blackwater Elite.

Before the start of the 2016–17 season, TNT resigned Williams to a two-year deal worth P10.8 million. Aside from him, TNT also re-signed his teammates Ryan Reyes and Aaron Aban. In the Philippine Cup, he became the 77th player to reach the 5,000 point milestone. Against Ginebra that conference, he made a go-ahead layup that gave TNT the lead with 1:25 remaining, and his teammates were able to close out the game from there. In a loss against the Meralco Bolts, he had 19 points. TNT then bounced back the next game with a 117–98 blowout victory over the Phoenix Fuel Masters, with him scoring 18 points and 10 boards in just 19 minutes. In Game One of their semifinals against the Beermen, the 35-year old came off the bench for 24 points and five rebounds, but TNT still lost. In Game 2, he only had nine points as he was in foul trouble, but TNT was able to tie the series. In Game 3, he helped limit Beermen MVP center June Mar Fajardo to just 16 points (with only one point in the 4th quarter) and nine rebounds as TNT grabbed a 2–1 lead. In Game 5, he had 18 points, seven rebounds, and three steals while holding Fajardo to 13 points for the TNT win. Despite his efforts, TNT was eliminated in seven games, with his rival Santos scoring 22 points. He also didn't make the All-Star team, despite his playoff resurgence. In the Commissioner's Cup finals, he faced Santos' Beermen once again. The Beermen beat them once again in six games. At the end of the season, he won a spot on the Mythical Second Team and his second Comeback Player of the Year award. He joined Bong Alvarez as the only multi-time winners of the Comeback Award.

==== Final seasons before initial retirement ====
In a 2017–18 Philippine Cup match versus Rain or Shine which TNT lost, Williams missed a three-pointer that could have sent the game into overtime. Against Blackwater, he missed the first half of that game due to heavy traffic on the way to the arena. He had to ride a motorcycle which he booked via Angkas to get to the arena. He was able to play in the second half, and the KaTropa won the game. In a win over Kia, he had 23 points, eight boards, and one block in almost 32 minutes and was even able to dunk three times in that game. He filled in for Mo Tautuaa, who had food poisoning. His next game after that was on his 36th birthday, in which he had eight points and seven rebounds, but missed a shot that could have won the game. In a win over NLEX, he had 17 points and 16 rebounds. TNT eventually lost to the Beermen in the quarterfinals. He then missed the start of the Commissioner's Cup due to an injury in his upper body. He rejoined the team against the Columbian Dyip. During the Governors' Cup, he renewed his contract with TNT.

In Game 3 of their 2019 Philippine Cup quarterfinal series against the Beermen, Williams threw Santos to the floor while they were going for a rebound. The Beermen went on to win that game and eliminate TNT. He also missed games during the Commissioner's Cup due to a back injury.

==== Initial retirement ====
On September 7, 2020, Williams announced his retirement from the league on social media. He received tributes from former coaches, teammates and rivals. The decision caught TNT management off guard, as they had extended his contract up to the end of that year, but they respected his decision. TNT held on to his rights.

==== Return to TNT ====
On March 4, 2021, TNT announced that Williams would be back with the team, as he had signed a two-year deal with them. Coach Chot Reyes, who had returned to coach the team, had a heart-to-heart conversation with him that convinced him to unretire. Williams had also kept in shape while he was unretired. He also said that his decision to retire was a "rash decision". In an elimination round win over Magnolia Hotshots, he had his best game since unretiring with 13 points, 15 rebounds, and three blocks. He missed the first four games of their semifinal series due to being put in the league's health and safety protocols. He returned in Game 5 to help TNT gain a 3–2 series lead. He then had 11 points and 10 rebounds that clinched TNT a spot in the 2021 Philippine Cup finals. There they faced Magnolia. In the Game 1 win, he injured his back in the third quarter and had to be taken to the hospital. He was able to play in Game 2, and hit one of TNT's PBA finals record 13 three-pointers made in the first half. TNT eventually won the championship in five games. He ended the season with a spot on the All-Defensive Team despite being 40 years old.

== PBA career statistics ==
Legend
GP	Games played	MPG	Minutes per game	FG%	Field-goal percentage
3FG%	3-point field-goal percentage	4P%	4-point field-goal percentage	FT%	Free-throw percentage
RPG	Rebounds per game	APG	Assists per game	SPG	Steals per game
BPG	Blocks per game	PPG	Points per game	127	Career high

As of the end of 2024–25 season

=== Season-by-season averages ===
Year	Team	GP	MPG	FG%	3P%	4P%	FT%	RPG	APG	SPG	BPG	PPG
2006–07	Sta. Lucia	45	39.2	.378	.312	—	.657	9.6	1.7	1.2	.5	17.3
2007–08	Sta. Lucia	53	40.5	.379	.289	—	.599	10.7	1.7	.9	.6	18.2
2008–09	Sta. Lucia	35	39.7	.332	.218	—	.622	10.2	2.5	1.0	.5	14.1
2009–10	Sta. Lucia	44	34.4	.369	.189	—	.557	10.6	2.2	1.3	.6	14.1
2009–10	Talk 'N Text	44	34.4	.369	.189	—	.557	10.6	2.2	1.3	.6	14.1
2010–11	Talk 'N Text	63	26.9	.466	.353	—	.475	7.2	1.2	.9	.5	9.5
2011–12	Talk 'N Text	58	24.1	.407	.234	—	.556	6.7	1.2	.6	.6	9.0
2012–13	Talk 'N Text	34	27.2	.415	.227	—	.667	7.6	.8	.7	.3	9.4
2013–14	Talk 'N Text	45	22.5	.421	.053	—	.417	5.5	.7	.6	.3	6.8
2014–15	Talk 'N Text	38	14.1	.380	.241	—	.543	3.6	.5	.6	.3	4.7
2015–16	TNT	35	16.5	.497	.143	—	.478	4.5	.4	.4	.3	5.8
2016–17	TNT	61	24.4	.479	.143	—	.544	6.9	1.0	.9	.4	9.3
2017–18	TNT	32	24.4	.382	.291	—	.467	7.5	.9	.8	.7	8.3
2019	TNT	25	22.3	.402	.105	—	.440	5.7	1.8	1.1	.4	3.5
2021	TNT	33	25.4	.383	.264	—	.544	5.7	1.4	1.1	.7	6.8
2022–23	TNT	50	26.3	.450	.309	—	.455	6.3	1.5	.7	.3	6.8
2023–24	TNT	23	29.1	.419	.280	—	.600	7.0	1.0	.7	.1	9.7
2024–25	TNT	60	21.8	.376	.337	.091	.671	4.9	1.1	.6	.2	6.3
Career		734	27.2	.401	.268	.091	.563	7.1	1.3	.8	.4	9.6

== National team career ==
In 2005, Williams was spotted by then Philippine National Team head coach Chot Reyes after the latter liked the former's work ethic and style of play. Reyes invited him to try out for the Philippine Team. He agreed to it, ensuing his arrival at the local basketball scene. However, the national team was suspended by FIBA from competing internationally from 2005 to 2007.

In 2007, Williams was looked at as a replacement for Rafi Reavis in that year's SEABA tournament. He didn't get to play in the SEABA tournament, but he was given permission to play in other tournaments in preparation for the 2007 FIBA Asia Championship. He missed some games due to a hamstring injury, but eventually made the team that would compete in the FIBA Asia Championship. That team finished 9th, with him making two game-winning free-throws against China to secure that placement.

Williams was again named into the RP Training Pool under Coach Yeng Guiao in 2008. The following year, he was cut from the training pool because of his illness.

Williams returned to the national team in 2010 for the Asian Games. The team was eliminated in the quarterfinals and finished sixth.

In 2011, Williams was the starting power forward for the Smart Gilas national basketball team, who finished 4th in the 2011 FIBA Asia Championship. In the game for 3rd place against South Korea, he missed two free-throws that led to the Koreans getting third place. He was able to play in an exhibition match against NBA stars that year.

In 2013, Williams was part of the tallest national team pool assembled at the time. However, he had to back out once again due to his old illness returning.

In 2015, Williams tore his MCL while training with the team. He was preparing to be called up for the 2015 FIBA Asia Championship.

In 2018, Williams was considered a part of the TNT core that would play in that year's Asian Games. However, those plans were scrapped after some of his TNT teammates were involved in the Philippines–Australia basketball brawl.

At 40 years old, Williams returned to the national team for the February window of the 2023 FIBA World Cup qualifiers.

== Personal life ==
In 2007, Williams met his future wife Erica Waters. They got married the following year. They had two children. They are now divorced.

Williams suffers from idiopathic thrombocytopenic purpura. He was first diagnosed with the recurring rare blood disorder in 2009. Since then, he has been taking regular medications.

In 2012, Williams published his own autobiography, Rising Higher. The book has since been out of print after major changes in his life.
