= Jared Dillinger =

Filipino-American basketball player (born 1984)

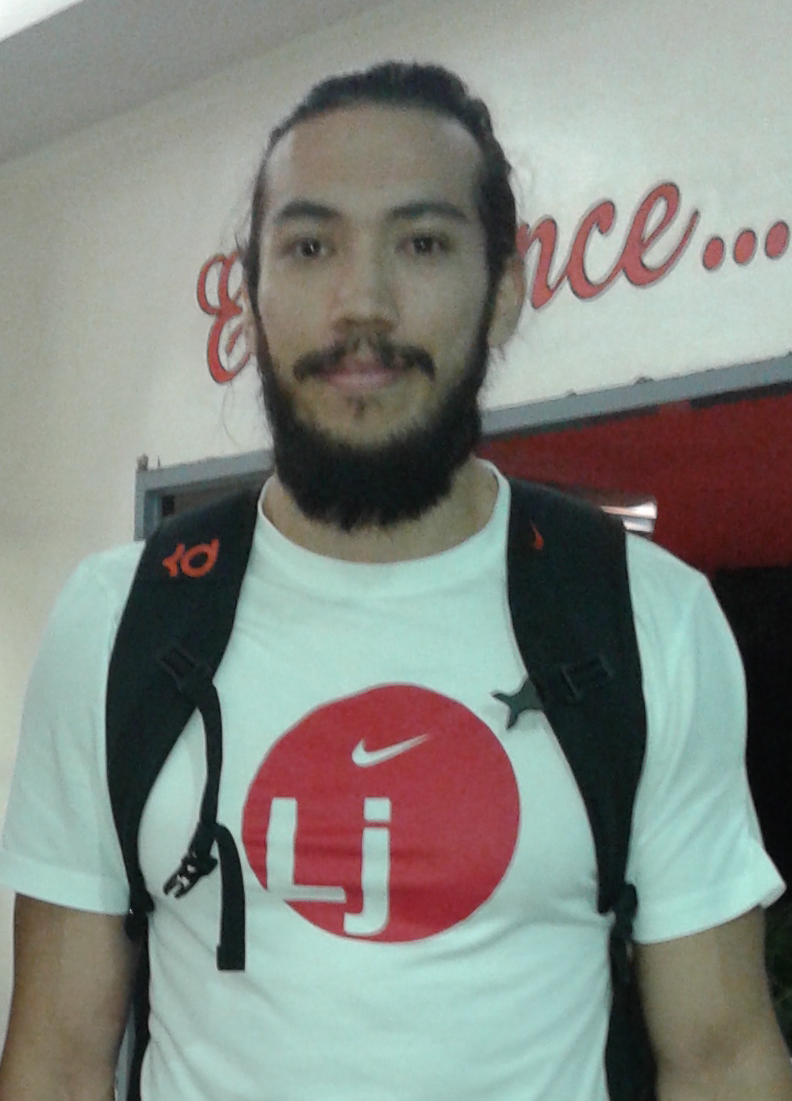
- Dillinger in 2014

Personal information
- Born: January 6, 1984 (age 42) Rapid City, South Dakota, U.S.
- Listed height: 6 ft 4 in (1.93 m)
- Listed weight: 220 lb (100 kg)

Career information
- High school: Dakota Ridge (Littleton, Colorado)
- College: Air Force (2003–2005); Hawaii (2006–2008)
- PBA draft: 2008: 1st round, 2nd overall pick
- Drafted by: Talk 'N Text Tropang Texters
- Playing career: 2008–2023
- Position: Small forward / guard

Career history
- 2008–2013: Talk 'N Text Tropang Texters
- 2013–2019: Meralco Bolts
- 2019–2023: Barangay Ginebra San Miguel

Career highlights
- 9× PBA champion (2008–09 Philippine, 2010–11 Philippine, 2011 Commissioner's, 2011–12 Philippine, 2012–13 Philippine, 2019 Governors', 2020 Philippine, 2021 Governors', 2022–23 Commissioner's); PBA All-Star (2009); PBA All-Rookie Team (2009); PBA Blitz Game MVP (2010)

Jared Ryan B. Dillinger (born January 6, 1984) is a Filipino-American former professional basketball player. He played for three teams during his career in the Philippine Basketball Association (PBA). Dillinger is the second pick overall in the 2008 draft class. He was a very versatile player that can play the 2, 3, and occasionally the 4 position. In his rookie year, he was included in the RP Training Pool under coach Yeng Guiao.

== Early career ==
Jared Ryan Dillinger was born on January 6, 1984, in Rapid City, South Dakota, to a Filipina mother and American father. He originally played for the U.S. Air Force Academy, then transferred to Hawaii, and was a starter on his last year. Dillinger averaged 31 minutes, 9.7 points, and 2 assists. He shot 38.3 percent from the 3-point line as a senior.

He first played for the Pampanga Buddies in the Liga Pilipinas to meet the requirements of the PBA which was to play 25 amateur games before entering the PBA draft. He soon got drafted by Talk’N’Text and was a part of the dynasty where he won 5 championships in a span in 4 years.

== Professional career ==
Dillinger was drafted second overall by the Talk 'N Text Tropang Texters in the 2008 PBA draft.

In June 2013, in the middle of the 2013 PBA Commissioner's Cup, Dillinger was traded to sister team Meralco Bolts in a three-team trade that also involved Barako Bull Energy. He signed with Barangay Ginebra in 2019 as a free agent, breaking the "gentelman's agreement" between him and his previous team Meralco Bolts.

His last team was Barangay Ginebra San Miguel and last played for them at the 2023 PBA On Tour.

On July 3, 2025, it was announced that Dillinger has retired to focus on business. He confirmed his retirement in January 2026.

== PBA career statistics ==
Legend
GP	Games played	MPG	Minutes per game
FG%	Field-goal percentage	3P%	3-point field-goal percentage	FT%	Free-throw percentage
RPG	Rebounds per game	APG	Assists per game	SPG	Steals per game
BPG	Blocks per game	PPG	Points per game	**Bold**	Career high

=== Season-by-season averages ===
Year	Team	GP	MPG	FG%	3P%	FT%	RPG	APG	SPG	BPG	PPG
2008–09	Talk 'N Text	45	26.0	.377	.310	.520	4.3	1.6	**.8**	**.5**	10.7
2009–10	Talk 'N Text	43	19.9	.374	.038	.606	4.2	1.5	.6	.2	6.7
2010–11	Talk 'N Text	44	17.4	.391	.306	.461	2.6	1.1	.4	**.5**	6.2
2011–12	Talk 'N Text	**48**	25.6	.401	.379	.537	3.1	1.8	**.8**	.3	10.2
2012–13	Talk 'N Text	41	24.4	.351	.271	.619	3.0	1.5	.4	.2	6.5
2012–13	Meralco	41	24.4	.351	.271	.619	3.0	1.5	.4	.2	6.5
2013–14	Meralco	33	**30.8**	.420	.348	.672	**4.5**	**2.7**	**.8**	**.5**	10.5
2014–15	Meralco	32	22.6	**.455**	.362	.591	3.8	1.3	.5	.1	9.1
2015–16	Meralco	43	25.8	.409	.332	.602	3.2	1.5	.6	.3	10.7
2016–17	Meralco	40	30.7	.375	.353	.544	3.3	1.9	.7	**.5**	**10.8**
2017–18	Meralco	27	23.4	.362	.319	.667	3.1	1.3	**.8**	.2	7.0
2019	Meralco	13	13.0	.447	**.400**	.800	2.5	.6	.2	.1	4.3
2019	Barangay Ginebra	13	13.0	.447	**.400**	.800	2.5	.6	.2	.1	4.3
2020	Barangay Ginebra	21	16.3	.396	.319	.667	2.4	.9	.3	.2	5.2
2021	Barangay Ginebra	13	12.8	.310	.130	**1.000**	1.9	.6	.3	.2	2.3
2022–23	Barangay Ginebra	8	5.9	.200	.000	—	.6	.1	.1	.0	.5
Career		451	23.2	.391	.324	.568	3.3	1.5	.6	.3	8.3

== Television career ==
In December 2023, Dillinger was one of three co-hosts of CNN Philippines' business and gaming program, The Future. He is also the co-host of "Let it Fly" podcast and also works with a Philippines-based cryptocurrency wallet where he educates people on emerging technologies.
