= Aaron Aban =

Filipino basketball player

Personal information
- Born: April 8, 1982 (age 44) Cagayan de Oro, Philippines
- Listed height: 6 ft 3 in (1.91 m)
- Listed weight: 185 lb (84 kg)

Career information
- High school: Liceo de Cagayan University (Cagayan de Oro)
- College: Letran
- PBA draft: 2006: 1st round, 7th overall pick
- Drafted by: Alaska Aces
- Playing career: 2006–2022
- Position: Shooting guard / small forward

Career history
- 2006–2008: Alaska Aces
- 2008–2009: Purefoods Tender Juicy Giants
- 2009–2010: Burger King Whoppers
- 2010–2016: Talk 'N Text Tropang Texters / TNT Tropang Texters / Tropang TNT / TNT KaTropa
- 2016–2017: GlobalPort Batang Pier
- 2019–2020: San Miguel Alab Pilipinas
- 2022: Sta. Rosa Laguna Lions

Career highlights
- 6× PBA champion (2007 Fiesta, 2010–11 Philippine, 2011 Commissioner's, 2011–12 Philippine, 2012–13 Philippine, 2015 Commissioner's); NCAA Philippines Most Improved Player (2005); 2× NCAA Philippines champion (2003, 2005)

Aaron Abril Galarrita Aban (born April 8, 1982) is a Filipino former professional basketball player. Born in Cagayan de Oro, he graduated his high school at Liceo de Cagayan University and went to Colegio de San Juan de Letran in college.

He is a former player of the Letran Knights in the NCAA and the Toyota Otis-Letran Sparks in the Philippine Basketball League. He joined the team in 2002 but after a solid performance in the 2003 NCAA finals grew in success.

He was drafted seventh overall by the Alaska Aces in the 2006 PBA draft. In 2008, he was signed by the Purefoods Tender Juicy Giants. During the offseason of 35th season, he was traded to Burger King Titans in exchange of Rey Evangelista. Before the start of the 2010 Fiesta Conference, he was signed by the Talk N' Text Tropang Texters as a free agent.

In 2019, Aban came out from retirement to play for the 2019–20 ABL season, suiting up for San Miguel Alab Pilipinas.

== PBA career statistics ==
Legend
GP	Games played	MPG	Minutes per game
FG%	Field-goal percentage	3P%	3-point field-goal percentage	FT%	Free-throw percentage
RPG	Rebounds per game	APG	Assists per game	SPG	Steals per game
BPG	Blocks per game	PPG	Points per game	**Bold**	Career high

=== Season-by-season averages ===
Year	Team	GP	MPG	FG%	3P%	FT%	RPG	APG	SPG	BPG	PPG
2006–07	Alaska	22	5.7	.292	.250	.538	.8	.2	.1	.0	1.6
2007–08	Alaska	19	8.7	.396	.421	.529	1.9	.1	.2	**.2**	2.9
2008–09	Purefoods	36	**17.4**	.477	.365	.586	2.2	**.8**	.3	**.2**	**5.8**
2008–09	Burger King	36	**17.4**	.477	.365	.586	2.2	**.8**	.3	**.2**	**5.8**
2009–10	Burger King	27	8.8	.364	.000	.700	.0	.0	.0	.0	2.3
2009–10	Talk 'N Text	27	8.8	.364	.000	.700	.0	.0	.0	.0	2.3
2010–11	Talk 'N Text	**61**	10.4	.443	.227	.595	1.6	.2	.3	.0	3.2
2011–12	Talk 'N Text	19	14.9	.406	.214	.727	2.4	.5	.3	.0	3.3
2012–13	Talk 'N Text	48	9.9	.458	**.429**	.727	1.3	.2	.3	.1	2.2
2013–14	Talk 'N Text	28	8.1	.333	.312	**1.000**	1.1	.1	.1	.0	1.3
2014–15	Talk 'N Text	38	13.0	.451	.412	.455	1.2	.2	.1	.1	2.7
2015–16	TNT	17	10.4	.354	.304	.250	.8	.2	.1	.1	2.5
2016–17	GlobalPort	15	17.1	**.511**	**.429**	.800	**2.7**	.3	**.4**	.0	4.1
Career		330	11.2	.424	.336	.610	1.4	.3	.2	.1	2.9
