= Melvin Mamaclay =

Filipino basketball player

Personal information
- Born: June 1, 1979 (age 47) Vigan, Ilocos Sur, Philippines
- Listed height: 6 ft 5 in (1.96 m)
- Listed weight: 190 lb (86 kg)

Career information
- College: Adamson
- PBA draft: 2007: 1st round13th overall
- Drafted by: Sta. Lucia Realtors
- Playing career: 2007–2009
- Position: Small forward / power forward

Melvin Mamaclay (born June 1, 1979) is a Filipino retired professional basketball player who last played for the Sta. Lucia Realtors in the Philippine Basketball Association (PBA). He was drafted thirteenth overall by Sta. Lucia in 2007.

== Professional career ==
Mamaclay was acquired by the Sta. Lucia Realtors in the 2007 PBA Draft when they traded Mark Isip and Ricky Calimag to the Coca-Cola Tigers.
