= Ryan Reyes =

Filipino-American basketball player

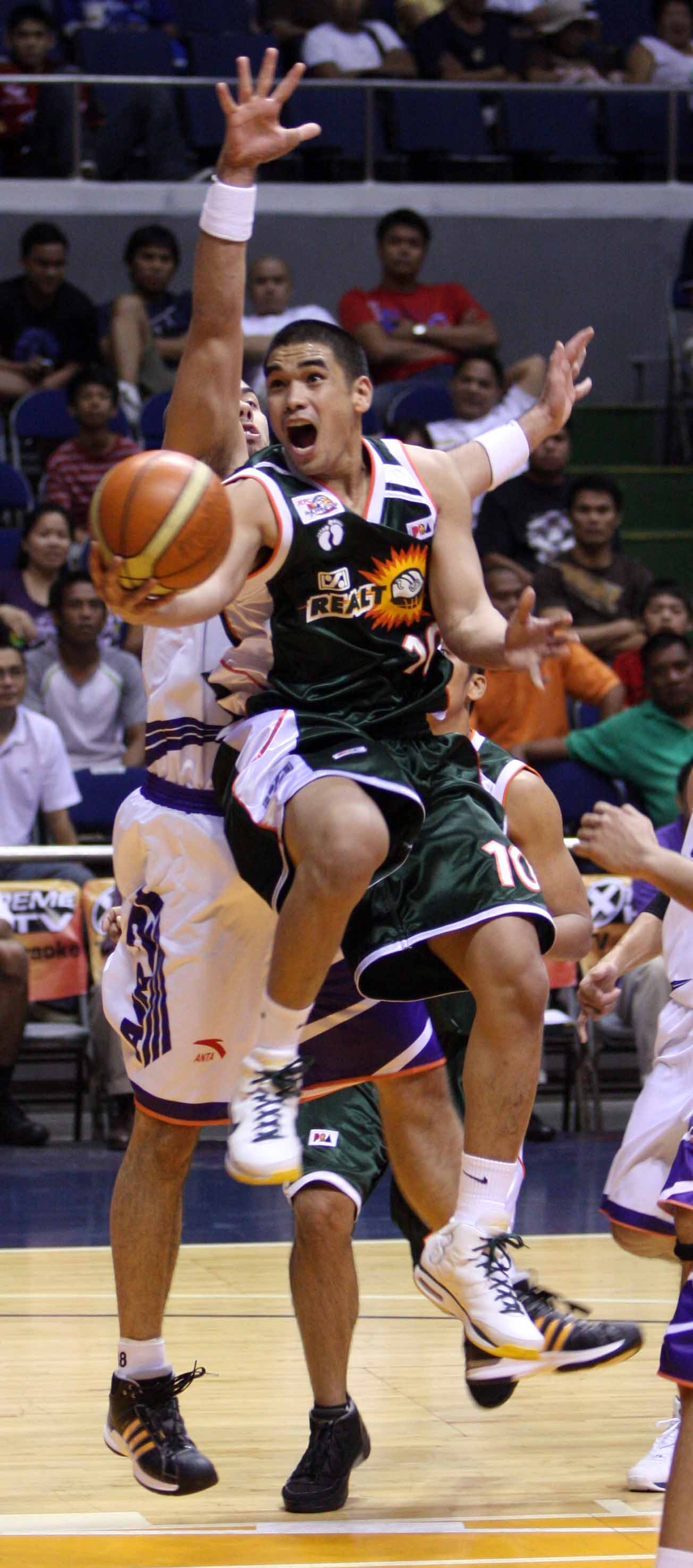
- Reyes with the Sta. Lucia Realtors in 2008

TNT Tropang 5G
- Title: Assistant coach
- League: PBA

Personal information
- Born: August 10, 1983 (age 43) Batangas, Philippines
- Listed height: 6 ft 2 in (1.88 m)
- Listed weight: 190 lb (86 kg)

Career information
- PBA draft: 2007: 1st round, 3rd overall pick
- Drafted by: Sta. Lucia Realtors
- Playing career: 2007–2024
- Position: Shooting guard
- Coaching career: 2026–present

Career history

Playing
- 2007–2010: Sta. Lucia Realtors
- 2010–2024: Talk 'N Text Tropang Texters / TNT Tropang Texters / Tropang TNT / TNT KaTropa / TNT Tropang Giga

Coaching
- 2026–present: TNT Tropang 5G (assistant)

Career highlights
- 8× PBA champion (2007–08 Philippine, 2010–11 Philippine, 2011 Commissioner's, 2011–12 Philippine, 2012–13 Philippine, 2015 Commissioner's, 2021 Philippine, 2024 Governors'); 3× PBA All-Star (2008–2010); 4× PBA All-Defensive Team (2008, 2010–2012); PBA Rookie of the Year (2008); PBA All-Rookie Team (2008); PBA Sportsmanship Award (2009)

Ryan Jay Reyes (born August 10, 1983) is a Filipino-American former professional basketball player and assistant coach for the TNT Tropang 5G of the Philippine Basketball Association (PBA), where he played the majority of his playing career.

Nicknamed "D-Energizer" for his energetic style of play, he was drafted third overall by the Sta. Lucia Realtors in the 2007 PBA draft. In 2010, following Sta. Lucia's disbandment, he was traded to TNT, where he would stay for the remainder of his playing career through 2024 until his retirement in 2025. In 2026, he re-entered the TNT franchise, serving the role of assistant coach.

Throughout his 17-year playing career, he won eight championships, four PBA All-Defensive Team selections, and three all-star selections.

== Amateur career ==
Prior to his current PBA career, Reyes also saw action in the National Basketball Conference (NBC) and played for the Cebuana Lhuillier-sponsored national team in 2005. He was named the Fantastic Freshman during the PBL's 2007 Conference awards.

== Professional career ==
=== 2007 PBA draft ===
In August 2007, while studying in the United States, he had to decide whether to finish his last semester of Kinesiology studies at California State-Fullerton or go to the Philippines and apply for the PBA draft. He chose the latter and was drafted third overall by the Sta. Lucia Realtors. Reyes was one of the few pure point guards in the 2007 PBA draft. His great size, athletic ability, solid perimeter shooting, driving skills, general court vision, defensive instincts, ball handling, and confidence in his abilities made him stand out from the other point guards.

=== Sta. Lucia Realtors (2007–2010) ===
He was an integral part of the Sta. Lucia Realtors 2007-08 Championship season, won PBA Rookie of the Year honors, and was the only rookie to play in the 2008 PBA All-Star Game. He also won the Sportsmanship award was the first rookie to win Player of the Week (December 17–23, 2007), and Player of the Month (December 2007). In 2008, he was named into the RP Training Pool under coach Yeng Guiao. In 2009, Reyes was a member of the PBA's Powerade Team Pilipinas basketball team that won the SEABA Championship.

=== Talk 'N Text Tropang Texters / TNT Tropang Texters / Tropang TNT / TNT KaTropa / TNT Tropang Giga (2010–2024) ===
On May 12, 2010, Reyes was traded to the Talk 'N Text Tropang Texters along with Kelly Williams, just months before Sta. Lucia's disbandment.

On September 17, 2025, it was announced that Reyes has retired.

== PBA career statistics ==
Legend
GP	Games played	MPG	Minutes per game	FG%	Field-goal percentage
3FG%	3-point field-goal percentage	4P%	4-point field-goal percentage	FT%	Free-throw percentage
RPG	Rebounds per game	APG	Assists per game	SPG	Steals per game
BPG	Blocks per game	PPG	Points per game	127	Career high

=== Season-by-season averages ===
Year	Team	GP	MPG	FG%	3P%	4P%	FT%	RPG	APG	SPG	BPG	PPG
2007–08	Sta. Lucia	53	27.3	.391	.299	—	.769	5.3	3.5	2.1	.1	9.6
2008–09	Sta. Lucia	31	25.6	.390	.305	—	.780	5.1	2.4	1.6	.1	9.3
2009–10	Sta. Lucia	41	28.8	.390	.272	—	.771	5.0	4.1	1.6	.1	10.5
2009–10	Talk 'N Text	41	28.8	.390	.272	—	.771	5.0	4.1	1.6	.1	10.5
2010–11	Talk 'N Text	61	26.3	.404	.366	—	.683	4.3	2.8	1.4	.2	9.3
2011–12	Talk 'N Text	47	24.3	.393	.365	—	.745	3.2	1.7	1.5	.2	7.8
2012–13	Talk 'N Text	50	23.9	.421	.322	—	.713	4.0	2.3	1.2	.1	7.8
2013–14	Talk 'N Text	39	21.8	.397	.337	—	.667	2.8	2.1	.6	.1	4.3
2014–15	Talk 'N Text	19	23.3	.359	.377	—	.750	3.7	2.1	1.5	.2	5.7
2015–16	TNT	41	23.2	.411	.378	—	.805	3.9	1.9	1.0	.2	6.7
2016–17	TNT	57	21.9	.346	.276	—	.694	3.4	2.5	.9	.2	4.9
2017–18	TNT	34	17.1	.363	.333	—	.889	2.1	1.3	1.2	.1	4.1
2019	TNT	47	17.2	.399	.371	—	.703	2.7	1.0	1.1	.3	5.1
2020	TNT	20	13.0	.343	.294	—	.778	2.1	.6	.9	.2	3.4
2021	TNT	33	17.0	.444	.409	—	.857	3.1	1.6	1.2	.3	5.3
2022–23	TNT	16	9.4	.333	.320	—	1.000	1.2	1.0	.4	—	1.9
2023–24	TNT	21	10.2	.222	.174	—	.833	1.0	1.0	.5	—	1.0
2024–25	TNT	1	2.6	—	—	—	—	1.0	—	—	—	—
Career		611	22.0	.391	.334	—	.751	3.5	2.2	1.2	.1	6.6
