= Nash Racela =

Filipino basketball coach (born 1971)

Adamson Soaring Falcons
- Position: Head coach
- League: UAAP

Personal information
- Born: November 30, 1971 (age 54)

Career information
- College: De La Salle
- Coaching career: 1998–present

Career history

Coaching
- 1998–2002: Batangas Blades
- 2002–2003: Batangas Blades
- 2003–2006: Coca Cola Tigers (assistant)
- 2004–2005: San Beda
- 2006–2008: San Miguel Beermen (assistant)
- 2008–2013; 2014–2016: TNT KaTropa (assistant)
- 2010–2018: Philippines (assistant)
- 2012–2013: Fruitas Shakers
- 2012–2016: FEU
- 2013–2014: Meralco Bolts (assistant)
- 2016–2018: TNT KaTropa
- 2016: Philippines
- 2018–2019: FEU (assistant)
- 2019–2021: Blackwater Elite / Blackwater Bossing
- 2021–present: Adamson
- 2024–present: Quezon Huskers (assistant)

Career highlights
- As head coach: MBA champion (2001); UAAP champion (2015); SEABA Cup champion (2016); PCCL champion (2015); AsiaBasket champion (2025 International); AsiaBasket Coach of the Tournament (2025 International); As assistant coach: 7x PBA champion (2003 Reinforced, 2009 Philippine, 2011 Philippine, 2011 Commissioner's, 2012 Philippine, 2013 Philippine, 2015 Commissioner's)
Medals
Men's basketball
Head coach for Philippines
SEABA Cup
Gold medal – first place	2016 Bangkok	Team
Assistant coach for Philippines
FIBA Asia Championship
Silver medal – second place	2013 Manila	Team

Raoul Cesar "Nash" Escueta Racela (born November 30, 1971) is a Filipino professional basketball coach.

Nash Racela was a graduate of De La Salle University before taking on a career as a coach. He also coached the Philippine squad that participated at the 2016 SEABA Cup.

== Coaching career ==
=== Batangas Blades ===
Racela started his career as assistant coach of Batangas Blades (Later renamed as LBC-Batangas Blades for sponsorship reasons), when Binky Favis was coaching the team. When Racela took over, with Eddie Laure as its star player. Racela won his MBA Coach of the Year in 2001.

=== San Beda ===
He served as head coach of San Beda Red Lions after replacing Jonathan Reyes, but fired and replaced by Koy Banal in 2005.

=== Assistant coach ===
Racela became an assistant coach of the Coca-Cola Tigers on its inaugural season, until 2006 (that time coached by Favis), when national team head coach Chot Reyes, assistant coaches Biboy Ravanes, and Aboy Castro joined San Miguel Beermen. He and Castro also joined Talk 'N Text when Reyes hired by that team, served for the team for almost a decade and won championships.

=== FEU ===
He was hired by the FEU Tamaraws in 2013, and led the team into multiple final four appearances, a finals runner-up in 2014, and a championship in 2015.

=== TNT KaTropa ===
After coaching FEU, he later coached TNT KaTropa, led them to a finals appearance, but dismissed before the next season's Governors' Cup.

=== Blackwater ===
He later coached Blackwater Elite, but fired after two seasons due to team's dismal performance.

=== Adamson ===
He is now coaching the Adamson Soaring Falcons.

== Coaching record ==
=== Collegiate record ===
Season	Team	GP	W	L	PCT	Finish	GP	PW	PL	PCT	Results
2004	SBC	14	7	7	.500	4th	3	2	1	.667	Semifinals
2005	SBC	7	1	6	.143	T-7th	—	—	—	—	(fired)
2013	FEU	14	10	4	.714	3rd	2	0	2	.000	Semifinals
2014	FEU	14	10	4	.714	2nd	6	3	3	.500	Runner-up
2015	FEU	14	11	3	.786	2nd	4	3	1	.750	Champion
2016	FEU	14	9	5	.643	3rd	2	1	1	.500	Semifinals
2021	AdU	14	6	8	.429	5th	—	—	—	—	Eliminated
2022	AdU	14	7	7	.500	4th	2	1	1	.500	Semifinals
2023	AdU	14	7	7	.500	5th	1	0	1	.000	4th-seed playoff
2024	AdU	14	6	8	.429	4th	2	1	1	.500	Semifinals
2025	AdU	14	6	8	.429	7th	—	—	—	—	Eliminated
Totals		133	74	59	.536		22	11	11	.500	1 championship

=== Professional record ===
Season	Team	Conference	Elimination round					Playoffs				
Season	Team	Conference	GP	W	L	PCT	Finish	GP	W	L	PCT	Results
2016–17	TNT	Philippine	11	6	5	.545	4th	9	5	4	.555	Semifinals
2016–17	TNT	Commissioner's	11	8	3	.727	4th	13	7	6	.692	Runner-up
2016–17	TNT	Governors'	11	8	3	.727	2nd	6	2	4	.333	Semifinals
2017–18	TNT	Philippine	11	5	6	.455	8th	2	1	1	.500	Semifinals
2017–18	TNT	Commissioner's	11	8	3	.727	3rd	2	0	2	.000	Semifinals
2017–18	TNT	Governors'	5	1	4	.200		—	—	—	—	(fired)
Totals			60	36	24	.600		32	15	17	.469	0 championships

== Personal life ==
Racela is the younger brother of Olsen Racela, who is a former professional basketball player and took over Nash's position as the head coach of the FEU Tamaraws until 2023. He is a cousin of collegiate basketball coach Yuri Escueta.

Preceded by Jonathan Reyes	San Beda Red Lions men's basketball head coach 2004–2005	Succeeded by Koy Banal
Preceded by Bert Flores	FEU Tamaraws men's basketball head coach 2013–2016	Succeeded by Olsen Racela
Preceded by Jong Uichico	Talk 'N Text Tropang Texters Head Coach; 2016–2017	Succeeded by Bong Ravena
Preceded by Bong Ramos	Blackwater Elite Head Coach; 2019–2021	Succeeded by Ariel Vanguardia
Preceded by Franz Pumaren	Adamson Soaring Falcons men's basketball head coach 2021–present	Succeeded by incumbent
