= 2002 PBA Commissioner's Cup finals =

| Team | Coach | Wins |
|---|---|---|
| Red Bull Thunder | Yeng Guiao | 4 |
| Talk 'N Text Phone Pals | Bill Bayno | 3 |
- Dates: September 6–20, 2002
- Television: Viva TV (IBC)
- Radio network: DZSR

PBA Commissioner's Cup finals chronology
- < 2001 2011 >

PBA finals chronology
- < 2002 Governors 2002 All-Filipino >

The 2002 Samsung-PBA Commissioner's Cup finals was the best-of-7 basketball championship series of the 2002 PBA Commissioner's Cup and the conclusion of the conference's playoffs. The Red Bull Thunder and Talk 'N Text Phone Pals played for the 82nd championship contested by the league.

Red Bull win their 2nd PBA title and retain the crown they won in the same conference last season with a 4-3 series victory over the Talk 'N Text. As of 2026, it is the only team to win back-to-back Commissioner's Cup championships.

Willie Miller won on his first season MVP and first finals MVP in Commissioner's Cup finals.

== Series scoring summary ==
| Team | Game 1 | Game 2 | Game 3 | Game 4 | Game 5 | Game 6 | Game 7 | Wins |
|---|---|---|---|---|---|---|---|---|
| Red Bull | 100 | 96 | 71 | 89 | 55 | 86 | 67 | 4 |
| Talk 'N Text | 102 | 86 | 80 | 81 | 77 | 78 | 60 | 3 |

== Games summary ==
=== Game 1 ===
Viva TV

September 6

recap

Red Bull Thunder 100, Talk 'N Text Phone Pals 102
Scoring by quarter: 26–22, 22–27, 21–29, 27–24
| Pts: Julius Nwosu 22 | Pts: Jerald Honeycutt 32 Pete Mickeal 31 |
Talk 'N Text leads series, 1-0

Cuneta Astrodome, Pasay

Jerald Honeycutt poured 22 of his 32 points in the final half as the Phone Pals dictated the tempo up to the last minute. Lordy Tugade drilled three straight triples to push the Thunder to within 98-101, but wrong decisions in the end dash their bid, Tugade converted a twinner with three seconds left instead of shooting a potential game-tying triple.

=== Game 2 ===
Viva TV

September 8

recap

Red Bull Thunder 96, Talk 'N Text Phone Pals 86
Scoring by quarter: 30–17, 16–25, 30–22, 20–22
| Pts: Antonio Lang 37 | Pts: Pete Mickeal 20 |
Series tied, 1-1

Araneta Coliseum, Quezon City

Tony Lang turn in a game-high 37 points and joined hands with Willie Miller in the final half to power the Thunder to a victory and redeem himself from a lackluster 14-point output in the first game of the series. Willie Miller, Jimwell Torion and Junthy Valenzuela scored crucial three-pointers in the third and fourth quarter with Miller knocking in 11 of his 14 points in that span, including three triples that broke the backs of the Phone Pals, which lost Victor Pablo early in the game due to a knee injury when he fell on his back while trying to stop Junthy Valenzuela underneath the basket.

=== Game 3 ===
Viva TV

September 11

recap

Red Bull Thunder 71, Talk 'N Text Phone Pals 80
Scoring by quarter: 19–25, 11–19, 20–17, 21–19
| Pts: Antonio Lang 21 | Pts: Jerald Honeycutt 26 |
Talk 'N Text leads series, 2-1

Araneta Coliseum, Quezon City

Jerald Honeycutt came up with his third consecutive double-double performance of 26 points and 13 rebounds while Pete Mickeal finished with 21 markers, four of which dealt the killer blows on the Thunder, Mickeal's short jumper and two free throws off a foul by Julius Nwosu capped a remarkable night for the Phone Pals.

=== Game 4 ===
Viva TV

September 13

recap

Red Bull Thunder 89, Talk 'N Text Phone Pals 81
Scoring by quarter: 27–18, 26–14, 14–19, 22-30
| Pts: Julius Nwosu 27 | Pts: Pete Mickeal 31 |
Series tied, 2-2

Cuneta Astrodome, Pasay

Willie Miller fended off the Phone Pals' last-ditch effort after sinking both of his free throws and knocking in a decisive triple in the final minute to save the Thunder from a total collapse after posting 20-point margins three-fourths of the way before the Phone Pals' uprising. Sean Lampley, who replaces Tony Lang on a short notice, finished with 22 points and 9 rebounds.

=== Game 5 ===
Viva TV

September 15

Red Bull Thunder 55, Talk 'N Text Phone Pals 77
Scoring by quarter: 12–19, 18–11, 10–25, 15–22
| Pts: Sean Lampley 17 | Pts: Jerald Honeycutt 23 |
Talk 'N Text leads series, 3-2

Araneta Coliseum, Quezon City

A 25-10 run by the Phone Pals broke the 30-all count at halftime and allow them to settle comfortably on a 55-40 advantage entering the fourth quarter. The Thunder's miscues and lethargic plays in which the Phone Pals forced them to costly turnovers saw the previous lowest output in a championship game set by Alaska in 2000 were shattered as Red Bull finished the game with only 55 points.

=== Game 6 ===
Viva TV

September 18

Red Bull Thunder 86, Talk 'N Text Phone Pals 78
Scoring by quarter: 16–13, 23–30, 23–19, 24–16
| Pts: Julius Nwosu 28 | Pts: Pete Mickeal 20 |
Series tied, 3-3

Philsports Arena, Pasig

Donbel Belano, Gilbert Demape and Jerald Honeycutt made their shots from the outside as the Phone Pals' three-point shooting clicked to keep them ahead, 43-39, in the first half.

=== Game 7 ===
Viva TV

September 20

Red Bull Thunder 67, Talk 'N Text Phone Pals 60
Scoring by quarter: 17–9, 16–18, 20–23, 14–10
| Pts: Sean Lampley 18 | Pts: Pete Mickeal 27 |
Red Bull wins series, 4-3

Araneta Coliseum, Quezon City

Jimwell Torion drained a game-clinching triple with 1:31 left that found its mark and dashed the hopes of the Phone Pals, the tough defense put up by both teams resulted to an all-time low combined total of 127 points in the final game and the lowest winning output of 67 Willie Miller won on his first sophomore Finals MVP and Batang Red Bull captures on his 2 peat back to back champion title.

2002 PBA Commissioner's Cup Champions

Red Bull Thunder
Second title

== Roster ==
Red Bull Thunder roster
Players

| Pos. | # | POB | Name | Height | Weight | DOB (YYYY–MM–DD) | From |
|---|---|---|---|---|---|---|---|
| G | 3 | (Philippines) | Jimwell Torion | 5 ft 9 in (1.75 m) | | | SCSIT |
| F | 4 | (United States) | Davonn Harp | 6 ft 4 in (1.93 m) | | | Kutztown |
| F | 6 | (Philippines) | Noli Locsin | 6 ft 3 in (1.91 m) | | | De La Salle |
| F | 8 | (Philippines) | Nelson Asaytono | 6 ft 3 in (1.91 m) | | | Manila |
| F | 9 | (Philippines) | Jay Mendoza | 6 ft 3 in (1.91 m) | | | Mapúa |
| F | 10 | (Philippines) | Junthy Valenzuela | 6 ft 2 in (1.88 m) | | | SCSIT |
| G | 11 | (Philippines) | Willie Miller | 5 ft 10 in (1.78 m) | | | Letran |
| G/F | 12 | (Philippines) | Vince Hizon | 6 ft 2 in (1.88 m) | | | Ateneo |
| G | 13 | (Philippines) | Anton Villoria | 5 ft 11 in (1.80 m) | | | Letran |
| F | 15 | (Philippines) | Lordy Tugade | 6 ft 3 in (1.91 m) | | | National-U |
| F | 20 | (Philippines) | Edmund Reyes | 6 ft 3 in (1.91 m) | | | UST |
| F | 21 | (United States) | Sean Lampley (I) | 6 ft 7 in (2.01 m) | | | California |
| F | 42 | (United States) | Antonio Lang (I) | 6 ft 8 in (2.03 m) | | | Duke |
| F | 99 | (Niger) | Julius Nwosu (I) | 6 ft 8 in (2.03 m) | | | Liberty |

Coaches

Head coach

- (Philippines) Yeng Guiao

Assistant coach(es)

- (Philippines) Roehl Nadurata
- (Philippines) Rudolf Hines
- (Philippines) Gil Lumberio
- (Philippines) Andy Jao

Legend

- (C) Team captain
- (I) Import
- Injured

Talk 'N Text Phone Pals roster
Players

| Pos. | # | POB | Name | Height | Weight | DOB (YYYY–MM–DD) | From |
|---|---|---|---|---|---|---|---|
| G/F | 3 | (Philippines) | Elmer Lago | 6 ft 2 in (1.88 m) | | | De La Salle |
| G | 4 | (United States) | Kenny Evans | 6 ft 0 in (1.83 m) | | | San Francisco State |
| G | 6 | (Philippines) | Gilbert Demape | 6 ft 1 in (1.85 m) | | | Cebu Tech |
| G | 8 | (Philippines) | Patrick Fran | 6 ft 0 in (1.83 m) | | | UST |
| F | 13 | (Philippines) | Mark Telan | 6 ft 6 in (1.98 m) | | | De La Salle |
| F | 20 | (Philippines) | Don Camaso | 6 ft 6 in (1.98 m) | | | Metro Manila Colleges |
| F | 33 | (Philippines) | Victor Pablo | 6 ft 4 in (1.93 m) | | | Far Eastern |
| F | | (United States) | Pete Mickeal (I) | 6 ft 7 in (2.01 m) | | | Cincinnati |
| F/C | 40 | (United States) | Jerald Honeycutt (I) | 6 ft 8 in (2.03 m) | | | Tulane |
| G | 42 | (Philippines) | Donbel Belano | 5 ft 8 in (1.73 m) | | | Visayas |
| C | 43 | (United States) | Alex Crisano | 6 ft 5 in (1.96 m) | | | Brooklyn |
| F/C | 81 | (Philippines) | Gabby Cui | 6 ft 4 in (1.93 m) | | | Ateneo |

Coaches

Head coach

- (United States) Bill Bayno

Assistant coach(es)

- (Philippines) Aric del Rosario
- (Philippines) Ariel Vanguardia
- (Philippines) Bong Go

Legend

- (C) Team captain
- (I) Import
- Injured

== Broadcast notes ==
| Game | Play-by-play | Analyst | Courtside Reporters & Halftime Hosts |
|---|---|---|---|
| Game 1 | | | |
| Game 2 | | | |
| Game 3 | | | |
| Game 4 | Boom Gonzalez | TJ Manotoc | |
| Game 5 | Noli Eala | Quinito Henson | Paolo Trillo and Jannelle So |
| Game 6 | | | |
| Game 7 | | | |
