= 2000 Mobiline Phone Pals season =

- Head coach: Eric Altamirano (Until June 2, 2000); Louie Alas
- General manager: Debbie Tan
- Owner: Pilipino Telephone Corporation

All-Filipino results
- Record: 5–10 (33.3%)
- Place: 7th seed
- Playoff finish: Quarterfinals (lost to San Miguel)

Commissioner's Cup results
- Record: 4–6 (40%)
- Place: 6th seed
- Playoff finish: Quarterfinals (lost to Tanduay)

Governors' Cup results
- Record: 9–7 (56.3%)
- Place: 1st seed
- Playoff finish: Semifinals (lost to Purefoods TJ, 3–1)

Mobiline Phone Pals seasons

The 2000 Mobiline Phone Pals season was the 11th season of the franchise in the Philippine Basketball Association (PBA) and fourth season under the banner Mobiline.

== Transactions ==
Players Added

Via Free Agency

- Celedon Camaso (From the Manila Metrostars of the MBA)
- Gherome Ejercito (From the San Juan Knights of the MBA)
- Gido Babilonia (From the MBA)
- Bong Ravena (From the MBA; signed in March 2000)

Via Trade

- Victor Pablo (From Shell for newly acquired Mark Telan)
Players Lost

Via Expansion Draft

- Glenn Capacio (Taken by Red Bull)

Via Trade

- Jeffrey Cariaso (To Tanduay for Mark Telan and a future first round pick)
- Bryan Gahol (To Shell; part of Telan-Pablo deal)

== Occurrences ==
Midway through the All-Filipino Cup Finals, coach Eric Altamirano, along with assistants Ryan Gregorio and Frankie Lim, were sacked by Mobiline following a poor start. They were replaced by Louie Alas and assistants Aric del Rosario and Ariel Vanguardia.

Fil-Tongan Asi Taulava was ordered to be deported by the Bureau of Immigration for failure to provide sufficient evidence regarding his citizenship issue and his fate was decided on March 29.

== Roster ==
2000 Mobiline Phone Pals roster
Players

Pos.	#	POB	Name	Height	Weight	DOB (YYYY–MM–DD)	From
G	1	(Philippines)	Bong Ravena	6 ft 1 in (1.85 m)			UE
C	5	(Philippines)	Gido Babilonia	6 ft 5 in (1.96 m)			UST
G	8	(Philippines)	Al Solis	6 ft 0 in (1.83 m)			Visayas
G	9	(Philippines)	Gherome Ejercito	6 ft 2 in (1.88 m)			Adamson
G/F	12	(Philippines)	Jose Francisco	6 ft 1 in (1.85 m)			Far Eastern
F	14	(Philippines)	Enrique Reyes	6 ft 3 in (1.91 m)			Ateneo
G	17	(Philippines)	Patrick Fran	6 ft 0 in (1.83 m)			UST
F	20	(Philippines)	Don Camaso	6 ft 6 in (1.98 m)			Metro Manila Colleges
F	29	(Philippines)	Josel Angeles	6 ft 2 in (1.88 m)			Lyceum
F	33	(Philippines)	Victor Pablo	6 ft 4 in (1.93 m)			Far Eastern
F/C	44	(Philippines)	Jerry Codinera	6 ft 5 in (1.96 m)			UE
C	55	(Tonga)	Asi Taulava	6 ft 9 in (2.06 m)			BYU–Hawaii
F	25	(United States)	Carlos Strong (C)	6 ft 6 in (1.98 m)			Boston University
F		(United States)	Milton Henderson (C)	6 ft 7 in (2.01 m)			California
F	31	(United States)	Todd Bernard (G)	6 ft 3 in (1.91 m)			Fresno State

Coaches
Head coach
- (Philippines) Eric Altamirano (All-Filipino Cup)
- (Philippines) Louie Alas (Commissioner's/Governors Cup)
Assistant(s)
- (Philippines) Louie Alas (All-Filipino Cup)
- (Philippines) Frankie Lim (All-Filipino Cup)
- (Philippines) Ryan Gregorio (All-Filipino Cup)
- (Philippines) Aric del Rosario (Commissioner's/Governors Cup)
- (Philippines) Ariel Vanguardia (Commissioner's/Governors Cup)
- (Philippines) Bong Go

Legend
- (DP) Unsigned draft pick
- (FA) Free agent
- (S) Suspended
- (C) Commissioner's Cup Import
- (G) Governor's Cup Import
- Injured

== Eliminations (Won games) ==
DATE	OPPONENT	SCORE	VENUE (Location)
March 10	Sta.Lucia	94-62	Philsports Arena
March 15	Red Bull	89-81	Philsports Arena
March 19	Pop Cola	113-76	Araneta Coliseum
April 7	San Miguel	79-64	Philsports Arena
May 3	Shell	79-47	Philsports Arena
June 23	Sunkist	85-76	Philsports Arena
July 5	Brgy.Ginebra	83-80	Philsports Arena
July 12	Tanduay	85-79	Araneta Coliseum
July 16	Red Bull	83-77	Araneta Coliseum
October 8	San Miguel	93-82	Araneta Coliseum
October 14	Pop Cola	95-73	Legaspi City
October 18	Red Bull		Ynares Center
October 22	Purefoods	89-84	Araneta Coliseum
October 29	Shell	99-93	Araneta Coliseum
November 10	Tanduay	95-86	Philsports Arena
November 17	Alaska	83-76	Ynares Center

All-Filipino Cup Commissioner's Cup Governor's Cup
