= Jimwell Torion =

Filipino basketball player

Personal information
- Born: March 13, 1973 (age 53) Argao, Cebu, Philippines
- Listed height: 5 ft 9 in (1.75 m)
- Listed weight: 149 lb (68 kg)

Career information
- College: Salazar Tech
- PBA draft: 2000: Elevated
- Drafted by: Batang Red Bull Energizers
- Playing career: 2000–2007
- Position: Point guard
- Number: 3

Career history
- 2000–2006: Red Bull Barako
- 2006: Sta. Lucia Realtors
- 2006–2007: Air21 Express

Career highlights
- 3× PBA champion (2001 Commissioner's, 2002 Commissioner's, 2005-06 Fiesta); 1× PBA All-Star (2000)

Jimwell Torion (born March 13, 1973) is a former Filipino professional basketball player in the PBA from 2000 to 2007.

== Career ==
After his college career with Salazar Institute of Technology in Cebu City, Torion was brought in by Photokina Marketing when it joined the amateur Philippine Basketball League (PBL) as Agfa Color (and later Red Bull). When Red Bull joined the Philippine Basketball Association (PBA) in the 2000 season, the team brought Torion in to PBA directly from the amateur PBL, along with Kerby Raymundo, Lordy Tugade, Junthy Valenzuela, Davonn Harp, and Bernard Tanpua. He became the starting point guard for the team, until Willie Miller came along.

His career was notable for the numerous fines and suspensions he had because of various violations, and in 2003, he was suspended indefinitely (later reduced to eight months) by then PBA Commissioner Noli Eala after he was tested positive for an illegal substance in a random test. The suspension was later lifted after he completed the rehab program.

== PBA career statistics ==
Legend
GP	Games played	MPG	Minutes per game
FG%	Field-goal percentage	3P%	3-point field-goal percentage	FT%	Free-throw percentage
RPG	Rebounds per game	APG	Assists per game	SPG	Steals per game
BPG	Blocks per game	PPG	Points per game	**Bold**	Career high

=== Season-by-season averages ===
Year	Team	GP	MPG	FG%	3P%	FT%	RPG	APG	SPG	BPG	PPG
2000	Red Bull	34	**26.2**	.440	.299	.755	3.7	3.0	.8	**.3**	**12.9**
2001	Red Bull	37	11.9	.430	**.400**	.827	2.8	3.1	.7	.0	9.0
2002	Red Bull	37	18.7	.359	.244	.815	2.6	3.4	.6	.1	5.4
2003	Red Bull	33	24.1	**.442**	.211	.709	**4.2**	**3.6**	.8	.1	8.4
2004–05	Red Bull	**60**	19.4	.393	.295	.696	3.4	3.3	.7	.1	7.0
2005–06	Red Bull	19	12.6	.370	.250	**.833**	1.7	1.6	.5	.1	3.6
2005–06	Sta. Lucia	12	21.9	.412	.150	.550	3.8	3.5	**1.0**	.0	7.0
2006–07	Air21	22	16.5	.367	.286	.643	1.8	2.4	.5	.0	4.1
Career		254	19.1	.411	.291	.741	3.1	3.1	.7	.1	7.5
