= 2008 PBA Fiesta Conference finals =

Team	Coach	Wins
(3) Barangay Ginebra Kings	Jong Uichico	4
(1) Air21 Express	Bo Perasol	3
- Dates: August 6–20, 2008
- MVP: Ronald Tubid and Eric Menk
- Television: ABC/TV5
- Announcers: See broadcast notes
- Radio network: Sports Radio 918
- Announcers: See broadcast notes

PBA Fiesta Conference finals chronology
- < 2007 2009 >

PBA finals chronology
- < 2007–08 Philippine 2008–09 Philippine >

The 2008 PBA Fiesta Conference finals was the best-of-7 championship series of the 2008 PBA Fiesta Conference and the conclusion of the conference's playoffs. The series was a best-of-seven affair and was the 95th championship disputed in the league.

== Road to the finals ==
Air21		Barangay Ginebra
Finished 12–6 (.667): 1st	Elimination round	Finished 10–8 (.556): 3rd
Bye	Wildcard phase	Def. Sta.Lucia, 2-0 (QF)
Bye	Quarterfinals	Def. Sta.Lucia, 2-0 (QF)
Def. Magnolia, 4–2	Semifinals	Def. Barako Bull, 4–0

== Series scoring summary ==
Team	Game 1	Game 2	Game 3	Game 4	Game 5	Game 6	Game 7	Wins
Barangay Ginebra	105	90	87	90	73	80	97	4
Air21	96	124	97	77	76	75	84	3
Venue	Araneta	Ynares	Araneta	Araneta	Cuneta	Araneta	Araneta

=== Game 1 ===
ABC

August 6
7:20 p.m.

boxscore

Barangay Ginebra Kings 105, Air21 Express 96
Scoring by quarter: 25–19, 25–20, 29–23, 20–28
Pts: Caguioa 22; Rebs: Alexander 25; Asts: Helterbrand 8	Pts: de Ocampo 22; Rebs: Thomas 16; Asts: Arboleda 4
Barangay Ginebra leads series, 1–0

Araneta Coliseum, Quezon City
Attendance: 16,028
Referees: Aldaba, Ting, Maurillo

Chris Alexander scored five of his seven fourth quarter points and came off with three offensive rebounds, each one proving crucial in helping the Kings stopped the Express' comeback bid from a 20-point third quarter deficit. Air21 whittled the deficit to as low as 90–96 on a hook by Steven Thomas, still 2:07 to go. Then Alexander canned in a charity off his offensive rebound and then tipped in a Jayjay Helterbrand miss to make it a nine-point game with 1:20 left. Eric Menk highlighted his best game in the conference by canning two charities in the first minute of the third period to earn his place as the 59th member of the league's 5,000-point club and his jumper from the left corner gave Ginebra its biggest lead at 64–44.

=== Game 2 ===
ABC

August 8
7:20 p.m.

boxscore

Barangay Ginebra Kings 90, Air21 Express 124
Scoring by quarter: 18–26, 27–32, 18–34, 27–32
Pts: Caguioa 26; Rebs: Alexander 10; Asts: Helterbrand 6	Pts: Santos, David 20; Rebs: Thomas 18; Asts: Arboleda, Thomas 5
Series tied, 1–1

Ynares Center, Antipolo
Referees: Montiel, Ferrer, Pascual

Air21 outscored Ginebra on all quarters in dealing the Kings their first loss in their last 14 games. The Express buried the Kings completely in the third period with a 14–0 run that padded a 58-45 halftime lead to 72–45. Air21 would lead by as many as 35 points, 117–82, following a three-point play by rookie Marvin Cruz and a three-point bomb by fellow rookie JC Intal heading into the final 3:05. The Express not only leveled the series but it also halted Ginebra's franchise-best 13-game winning streak.

=== Game 3 ===
TV5

August 10
6:30 p.m.

boxscore

Barangay Ginebra Kings 87, Air21 Express 97
Scoring by quarter: 30–22, 20–24, 18–20, 19–31
Pts: Caguioa 21; Rebs: Alexander 17; Asts: Caguioa, Pacana 4	Pts: David 25; Rebs: Thomas 20; Asts: Arboleda 9
Air21 leads series, 2–1

Araneta Coliseum, Quezon City
Attendance: 15,142

KG Canaleta drained four triples in the most crucial stretches of the fourth period. Ginebra was in control for most of the game until the Express got things going in the third period and early in the fourth as Canaleta caught fire and Air21 outscored the Kings, 17–6, for an 87–76 lead. Chris Alexander was at the short end in several one-on-one confrontations with Steven Thomas in the second half and the loss put to naught his first PBA triple double of 14 points, 17 rebounds and 11 blocks. The 11 rejections was the most by any player in the last 19 years after Jerry Codinera swatted away the same number of attempts in a game for Purefoods in 1989. Toyota import Andy Fields holds the all-time record of 13.

=== Game 4 ===
TV5

August 13
7:20 p.m.

boxscore

Barangay Ginebra Kings 90, Air21 Express 77
Scoring by quarter: 19–17, 24–23, 25–20, 22–17
Pts: Alexander 22; Rebs: Alexander 18; Asts: Caguioa 5	Pts: Thomas 19; Rebs: Thomas 16; Asts: Arboleda, Se 3
Series tied, 2–2

Araneta Coliseum, Quezon City
Referees: Cruz, Aldaba, Quilinguen

From a 43–40 lead at halftime, the Kings used a 9–0 run early in the third period capped by a three-point play from Junthy Valenzuela for a 52–43 lead. They led by as many as 15 points on a foul shot by Eric Menk, 83–68, with four minutes to play.

=== Game 5 ===
TV5

August 15
7:20 p.m.

boxscore

Barangay Ginebra Kings 73, Air21 Express 76
Scoring by quarter: 26–19, 12–26, 16–12, 19–19
Pts: Alexander 21; Rebs: Alexander 21; Asts: Paul Artadi 5	Pts: Thomas, David 15; Rebs: Thomas 19; Asts: Arboleda, Santos, Billones 2
Air21 leads series, 3–2

Cuneta Astrodome, Pasay
Referees: Cruz, Calungcaguin, Guevarra

The Express held Ginebra top gun Mark Caguioa to seven points in the contest and the entire Ginebra team scoreless in the last 2:44 of play. Arwind Santos took a crucial steal and a breakaway lay-up with 43.3 seconds to go. The Kings actually had a chance to send the game into overtime but Chris Alexander was called for a traveling violation with the team down by two and with only 2.6 seconds left.

=== Game 6 ===
TV5

August 17
6:30 p.m.

boxscore

Barangay Ginebra Kings 80, Air21 Express 75
Scoring by quarter: 15–27, 19–10, 27–18, 19–20
Pts: Alexander 37; Rebs: Alexander 24	Pts: Thomas 20
Series tied, 3–3

Araneta Coliseum, Quezon City
Attendance: 18,043

Air21 zoomed to a 14–0 lead as the Kings missed their first six shots and committed three of their six first half turnovers. The Express padded this to their biggest, 33–17, with 7:21 left in the second quarter. The half ended at 37–34 in favor of the Express, marking a magnificent rally by Ginebra in the final four minutes of the second period. Chris Alexander had a PBA career-best performance of 37 points 24 rebounds as he went on the attack mode in the third quarter with Thomas already in foul trouble, and the Kings rode on a 23-5 onslaught and closed out the third quarter with a 13–0 run to take a 61–55 lead.

=== Game 7 ===
TV5

August 20
7:20 p.m.

boxscore

Barangay Ginebra Kings 97, Air21 Express 84
Scoring by quarter: 26–21, 23–25, 23–17, 25–21
Pts: Tubid 22 Menk 21	Pts: Thomas 24 Santos 19
Barangay Ginebra wins series, 4–3

Araneta Coliseum, Quezon City
Attendance: 22,902

The Kings established leads of as many as 13 points, the last at 65-52 after a daredevil drive by Ronald Tubid heading into the final 7:34 of the third quarter. Chris Alexander played on the edge of fouling out with 10:37 left in the game but gallantly held on to stand at Ginebra's frontline of defense, holding the Express without a field goal in the last 4:27. Air21 led, 84–83, after an Arwind Santos follow up of his own miss, but that would prove to be the final time the Express would score as they lapsed into a mazed of errors and ill-advised shots.

2008 Fiesta Conference Champions

Barangay Ginebra Kings
8th title

== Rosters ==
=== Barangay Ginebra Kings ===
Barangay Ginebra Kings roster
Players
Coaches

Pos.	#	POB	Name	Height	Weight	DOB (YYYY–MM–DD)	From
F/C	2	(Philippines)	Billy Mamaril	6 ft 6 in (1.98 m)			Bakersfield
C	4	(United States)	Rafi Reavis	6 ft 8 in (2.03 m)			Coppin State
G	5	(Philippines)	Macky Escalona	5 ft 9 in (1.75 m)			Ateneo
G/F	9	(Philippines)	Rodney Santos	6 ft 2 in (1.88 m)			San Sebastian
G/F	10	(Philippines)	Junthy Valenzuela	6 ft 3 in (1.91 m)			SCSIT
G	13	(Philippines)	Jayjay Helterbrand	5 ft 11 in (1.80 m)			Kentucky State
G	16	(Philippines)	Paul Artadi	5 ft 7 in (1.70 m)			UE
G	22	(Philippines)	Chris Pacana	6 ft 1 in (1.85 m)			Saint Francis of Assisi
F	27	(Philippines)	Willy Wilson	6 ft 3 in (1.91 m)			De La Salle
F/C	30	(United States)	Eric Menk (C)	6 ft 6 in (1.98 m)			Lake Superior State
F	33	(Philippines)	Victor Pablo	6 ft 4 in (1.93 m)			Far Eastern
F/C	43	(United States)	Alex Crisano	6 ft 7 in (2.01 m)			Brooklyn
C	44	(United States)	Chris Alexander (I)	7 ft 1 in (2.16 m)			Iowa State
G	47	(Philippines)	Mark Caguioa	6 ft 1 in (1.85 m)			Glendale CC (CA)
G/F	71	(Philippines)	Ronald Tubid	6 ft 1 in (1.85 m)			UE
F	80	(Philippines)	Sunday Salvacion	6 ft 3 in (1.91 m)			St. Benilde

Head coach

- (Philippines) Jong Uichico

Assistant coach(es)

- (Philippines) Art dela Cruz
- (Philippines) Juno Sauler
- (Philippines) Allan Caidic

Legend

- (C) Team captain
- (CI) Commissioner's Cup Import
- (GI) Governors' Cup Import
- (EI) EASL Import
- (DP) Unsigned draft pick
- (FA) Free agent
- (IN) Inactive
- (S) Suspended
- (R) Rookie
- Injured

=== Air21 Express ===
Air21 Express roster
Players
Coaches

Pos.	#	POB	Name	Height	Weight	DOB (YYYY–MM–DD)	From
G	3	(Philippines)	Egay Billones	5 ft 9 in (1.75 m)			Centro Escolar Las Piñas
F	7	(Philippines)	JC Intal	6 ft 4 in (1.93 m)			Ateneo
F	9	(Philippines)	KG Canaleta	6 ft 6 in (1.98 m)			UE
F	10	(Philippines)	Gabby Espinas	6 ft 4 in (1.93 m)			Philippine Christian
G	12	(Philippines)	Marvin Cruz	5 ft 8 in (1.73 m)			UP Diliman
C	13	(Philippines)	Ervin Sotto	6 ft 7 in (2.01 m)			Saint Francis of Assisi
F/C	16	(Philippines)	Homer Se	6 ft 5 in (1.96 m)			San Sebastian
F	18	(Philippines)	Doug Kramer	6 ft 5 in (1.96 m)			Ateneo
G	19	(Philippines)	Wynne Arboleda (C)	5 ft 11 in (1.80 m)			MLQU
G	20	(Philippines)	Gary David	6 ft 2 in (1.88 m)			Lyceum
F	29	(Philippines)	Arwind Santos	6 ft 4 in (1.93 m)			Far Eastern
F	33	(Philippines)	Ranidel De Ocampo	6 ft 6 in (1.98 m)			Saint Francis of Assisi
F/C	55	(United States)	Steven Thomas (I)	6 ft 9 in (2.06 m)			Middle Tennessee

Head coach

- (Philippines) Bo Perasol

Assistant coach(es)

- (Philippines) Leo Isaac

Legend

- (C) Team captain
- (CI) Commissioner's Cup Import
- (GI) Governors' Cup Import
- (EI) EASL Import
- (DP) Unsigned draft pick
- (FA) Free agent
- (IN) Inactive
- (S) Suspended
- (R) Rookie
- Injured

== Broadcast notes ==
The 2008 Fiesta Conference is the last PBA tournament to be broadcast by the Associated Broadcasting Company, as the network declined renewal of its broadcast rights following its blocktime deal with MPB Primedia, Inc. Afterwards, Radio Philippines Network became the PBA's new broadcaster. Following game 2 on August 8, ABC was reformatted as TV5, but the network continued to broadcast the finals under the auspices of MPB Primedia. The championship series was the last PBA event covered under the ABC name and the only PBA event covered under the TV5 name until 2013.

The finals broadcasters are:

Game	Play-by-play	Analyst	Courtside Reporters
Game 1	Richard del Rosario	Jason Webb	Dominic Uy, Eric Reyes and Miakka Lim
Game 2	Ed Picson	Quinito Henson	
Game 3	Mico Halili	Rado Dimalibot	Magoo Marjon
Game 4	Ed Picson	Jason Webb	Dominic Uy and Eric Reyes
Game 5	Mico Halili	Quinito Henson	Richard del Rosario and Magoo Marjon
Game 6	Ed Picson	Quinito Henson	Richard del Rosario and Dominic Uy
Game 7	Mico Halili	Jason Webb	Dominic Uy and Eric Reyes
