= Lordy Tugade =

Filipino basketball player (born 1977)

Lordy R. Tugade
Personal information
- Born: December 30, 1977 (age 48) Alaminos, Pangasinan, Philippines
- Listed height: 6 ft 3 in (1.91 m)
- Listed weight: 185 lb (84 kg)

Career information
- College: NU
- PBA draft: 2000: Elevated
- Drafted by: Batang Red Bull Energy Kings
- Playing career: 2000–2012
- Position: Shooting guard / small forward
- Number: 15, 30, 18

Career history
- 2000–2006: Red Bull Barako
- 2006–2012: Magnolia Beverage Masters/San Miguel Beermen
- 2012: Powerade Tigers

Career highlights
- 5x PBA champion (2001 Commissioner's, 2002 Commissioner's, 2005–06 Fiesta, 2009 Fiesta, 2011 Governors'); PBA Finals Most Valuable Player (2005–06 Fiesta); 2x PBA All-Star (2003, 2008); PBA Mythical First Team (2006)

Lordy Tugade (born December 30, 1977, in Alaminos, Pangasinan) is a Filipino retired professional basketball player. He last played for the Powerade Tigers in the Philippine Basketball Association (PBA).

Known as the Alaminos Assassin for his three-point shooting, he played for the NU Bulldogs in the UAAP and the Red Bull Barako both in their PBL and PBA stints before being traded to San Miguel in October 2006.

== Early life ==
Tugade grew up as the fourth of six children, and the eldest son of his family. Growing up, he played volleyball as he developed his leaping ability and grew taller.

== Amateur career ==
During the late 1990s, Tugade was recruited by Jojo Villa to play for the NU Bulldogs. He joined up with fellow Pangasinense Danny Ildefonso to lead the Bulldogs to decent finishes in the UAAP. Tugade then became NU's primary offense player after Ildefonso's departure to the PBL. In UAAP season 61, he led the team in scoring with 16.4 points per game.

He later joined the Red Bull Energy Drink squad in the Philippine Basketball League with Ildefonso and later Junthy Valenzuela, Jimwell Torion, Davonn Harp and Kerby Raymundo. He once made the PBL Mythical Team. Still, Red Bull failed to win a single title in the PBL.

== PBA career ==
=== Red Bull Barako ===
In 2000, Red Bull moved up to the PBA ranks as its 10th member. Newly installed head coach Yeng Guiao picked Tugade as one of six direct-hire players from their amateur team.

He played a limited role during his first three seasons in the league but was instrumental in Red Bull's two title victories in the 2001 and 2002 Commissioner's Cup tournaments. In 2003, he competed in the slam dunk contest during All-Star Weekend. At the end of the 2003 season, he signed a new two-year deal with the team.

By the 2004–05 season, Tugade's role increased after the franchise retooled its lineup following losses to Harp, Willie Miller, and for a while, Mick Pennisi. Along with Enrico Villanueva both led Red Bull to a surprising semifinals appearance in the 2005 Fiesta Conference.

At the 2005–06 Fiesta Conference, through the effort of Tugade, Villanueva, the return of Pennisi, the acquisition of rookie shooting guard Larry Fonacier, the much-suited import James Penny, and the other tough players from the team, Red Bull won the Fiesta Conference crown and the club's first title in four years. In Game 2 against the Purefoods Chunkee Giants, Tugade outscored all locals with 30 points before eventually winning the championship. He was named the Finals MVP for the first and only time in his PBA career.

The next conference, Tugade averaged 56.7 percent from the three-point distance, the highest of his career and became the league's leading three-point shooter during the 2006 Philippine Cup. The Bulls made it to the finals but lost to Purefoods in six games. At the end of the season, he led the team in scoring, was ranked fourth in the MVP race and became part of the First Mythical Team selection for the first time in his career. He made 153 three pointers, the most of his career. He also got to participate in the three-point shootout during that season's All-Star Weekend.

=== San Miguel Beermen ===
At the start of the 2006–07 PBA Philippine Cup, Tugade was sidelined with an injury and missed the first part of the conference. However, he was later traded to San Miguel Beermen in a three-way deal that also involved Rommel Adducul of the Barangay Ginebra Kings.

With a strong lineup, Tugade played a limited role for the Beermen as he was still recuperating from his injury while sharing minutes with Danny Seigle, Chris Calaguio and Dondon Hontiveros. He posted significant numbers for San Miguel during their long eight-game winning streak.

From the 2008–09 season, Tugade was plagued by injuries, playing only 64 games from 2008–11. His minutes also began to decrease in his tenure with San Miguel.

In 2010, Tugade was traded to back to Barako in exchange for Sunday Salvacion. However, due to injuries, he didn't get to play for Barako again and when Barako folded, he was placed in a dispersal draft where San Miguel picked him up. He got to experience one more title with the team when they won the 2011 Governors' Cup.

=== Powerade Tigers: Final season and retirement ===
Tugade did not fully recover from his injuries but played 32 games in the 2011–12 season, averaging career-lows of 3.7 points and 1.5 rebounds. He was traded to the Powerade Tigers along with Rabeh Al-Hussaini and Rey Guevarra before the start of the 2012 Governors' Cup. At the end of the season, he decided to retire because of his injuries.

== PBA career statistics ==
Legend
GP	Games played	MPG	Minutes per game
FG%	Field-goal percentage	3P%	3-point field-goal percentage	FT%	Free-throw percentage
RPG	Rebounds per game	APG	Assists per game	SPG	Steals per game
BPG	Blocks per game	PPG	Points per game	**Bold**	Career high

=== Season-by-season averages ===
Year	Team	GP	MPG	FG%	3P%	FT%	RPG	APG	SPG	BPG	PPG
2000	Red Bull	27	12.2	.349	.179	**1.000**	2.1	.3	.1	**.2**	4.1
2001	Red Bull	37	11.9	.347	.333	.750	1.5	.5	.2	—	4.4
2002	Red Bull	46	16.8	.415	.325	.659	2.0	.8	.2	**.2**	7.2
2003	Red Bull	42	22.8	**.466**	.336	.688	3.8	1.1	.4	.1	9.8
2004–05	Red Bull	**76**	26.2	.388	.294	.738	**4.6**	1.1	**.5**	**.2**	12.7
2005–06	Red Bull	66	27.4	.433	**.389**	.707	4.0	.8	.4	.1	**15.6**
2006–07	Red Bull	25	20.6	.402	.360	.795	3.6	.6	.2	.1	11.0
2006–07	San Miguel	25	20.6	.402	.360	.795	3.6	.6	.2	.1	11.0
2007–08	Magnolia	48	**27.6**	.418	.327	.813	3.9	**1.3**	.4	.1	14.2
2008–09	San Miguel	26	22.4	.390	.317	.829	3.3	1.0	.2	.1	12.3
2009–10	San Miguel	20	18.6	.362	.304	.680	2.8	.7	.4	—	7.6
2010–11	San Miguel / Petron	18	10.9	.313	.333	.667	.8	.6	.1	—	3.7
2011–12	Petron	32	13.3	.354	.247	.727	1.5	.6	.1	.1	3.7
2011–12	Powerade	32	13.3	.354	.247	.727	1.5	.6	.1	.1	3.7
Career		463	21.0	.405	.329	.746	3.1	.8	.3	.1	10.0

== Player profile ==
Tugade is known for his three-point shooting and athleticism. He is tall for his position compared to other PBA guards, creating mismatches on offense. With his athleticism, he was tasked with defending the opponent's best player. Allan Caidic considered him as one of the best three-point shooters of his generation. He once made 153 three-pointers in a season.
