= 2000 PBA draft =

Player selection in Philippine basketball

General information
- Date(s): January 9, 2000
- Time: 3:00 pm
- Location: Glorietta Activity Center, Makati
- Network(s): Viva TV on IBC

Overview
- League: Philippine Basketball Association
- First selection: Paolo Mendoza (Sta.Lucia)

The 2000 Philippine Basketball Association (PBA) rookie draft was an event at which teams drafted players from the amateur ranks. It was held on January 9, 2000, at the Glorietta Activity Center in Makati.

== Expansion team Red Bull ==
*	Mythical team member	^{#}	All-star

In 2000, Red Bull became the tenth member of the PBA. The team were allowed to take six players from their PBL team.

Name	Position	School/club team	Country of origin
Davonn Harp *	C	Kutztown University of Pennsylvania	United States
Kerby Raymundo*	F	Letran	Philippines
Bernard Tanpua	F	Perpetual Help	Philippines
Jimwell Torion	PG	SCSIT	Philippines
Lordy Tugade*	SF	National	Philippines
Junthy Valenzuela^{#}	SF	SCSIT	Philippines

== Direct hire ==
*	Mythical team member	^{#}	All-star

PBA team	Player	Country of Origin*	College
Barangay Ginebra Kings	Jayjay Helterbrand*	United States	Kentucky State
Tanduay Rhum Masters	Dondon Hontiveros*	Philippines	Cebu
San Miguel Beermen	Dorian Peña*	United States	Coppin State
Batang Red Bull Energizers	Mick Pennisi	Australia	Eastern Michigan
Sta. Lucia Realtors	Robert Wainwright	United States	Solano

== Round 1 ==
Pick	Player	Country of Origin*	PBA team	College
1	Paolo Mendoza	Philippines	Sta. Lucia Realtors	UP Diliman
2	Mark Steven Victoria	Philippines	Pop Cola Panthers	Far Eastern
3	Dino Aldeguer	Philippines	Purefoods Tender Juicy Hotdogs	De La Salle
4	Erwin Velez	Philippines	Mobiline Phone Pals	Letran
5	Joseph Gumatay	Philippines	Batang Red Bull Energizers	UP Diliman
6	Ernesto Billones	Philippines	Barangay Ginebra Kings	Las Piñas
7	Ronaldo Carmona, Jr.	Philippines	San Miguel Beermen	Perpetual Help
8	Glen Peter Yap	Philippines	Alaska Aces	Adamson
9	Patrick Madarang	United States	Alaska Aces	UP Diliman
10	Randy Lopez	Philippines	Sta. Lucia Realtors	St. Benilde

== Round 2 ==
Pick	Player	Country of Origin*	PBA team	College
11	Allan Gamboa	Philippines	Pop Cola Panthers	UP-Diliman
12	Joel Co	Philippines	Purefoods Tender Juicy Hotdogs	
13	Angelo Velasco	Philippines	Mobiline Phone Pals	Santo Tomas
14	William Marasigan	Philippines	Barangay Ginebra Kings	San Sebastian
15	John Tigley	Canada	Purefoods Tender Juicy Hotdogs	
16	Allan Yu	Philippines	Tanduay Rhum Masters	Quezon
17	Joaquin Torres	Philippines	Shell Velocity	Santo Tomas

== Round 3 ==
Pick	Player	Country of origin*	PBA team	College
21	Arthur Managbanag	Philippines	Sta. Lucia Realtors	
22	Antonio Reyes	United States	Pop Cola Panthers	Queensland
23	Rommel Saga	Philippines	Purefoods Tender Juicy Hotdogs	San Beda College
24	Jojo Castillo	Philippines	San Miguel Beermen	

== Round 4 ==
Pick	Player	Country of origin*	PBA team	College
31	Noel David	Philippines	San Miguel Beermen	

== Undrafted players signed by PBA team ==
- Barangay Ginebra Kings signed Alex Crisano and Ronald Magtulis from Far Eastern.
- Mobiline Phone Pals signed Don Camaso and Gherome Ejercito from Adamson University.
- Pop Cola Panthers signed Wynne Arboleda from Manuel Quezon.
- Sta. Lucia Realtors signed Chris Tan from La Salle-Manila.
- Tanduay Rhum Masters signed Rudy Hatfield from Michigan-Dearborn.

== Note ==
*All players are Filipinos until proven otherwise.
