= Wynne Arboleda =

Filipino basketball player

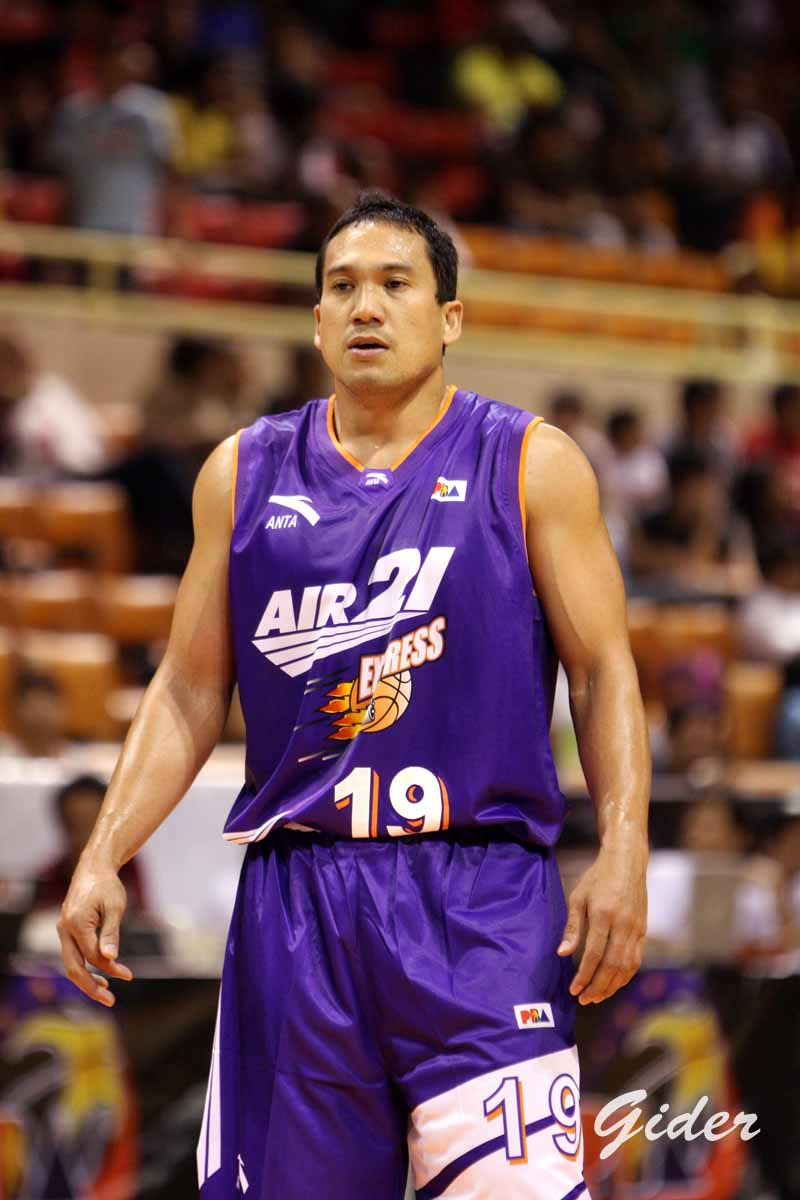
- Arboleda in 2008

San Sebastian Stags
- Title: Assistant coach
- League: NCAA Philippines

Personal information
- Born: November 26, 1976 (age 49) Kalibo, Aklan, Philippines
- Listed height: 5 ft 11 in (1.80 m)
- Listed weight: 180 lb (82 kg)

Career information
- College: Panay Technological College; MLQU
- PBA draft: 2000: Undrafted
- Playing career: 1998–2015
- Position: Point guard
- Coaching career: 2026–present

Career history

Playing
- 1998–1999: Laguna Lakers
- 2000: Pop Cola Panthers
- 2001: Tanduay Rhum Masters
- 2002–2012: FedEx/Air21 Express/Barako Bull Energy
- 2012–2014: Air21 Express
- 2014–2015: NLEX Road Warriors

Coaching
- 2026–present: San Sebastian (assistant)

Career highlights
- PBA Mythical Second Team (2007); 2× PBA Defensive Player of the Year (2007, 2009); 4× PBA All-Defensive Team (2006–2009)

Wynne Arboleda (born November 26, 1976) is a Filipino former professional basketball player who is the currently assistant coach for the San Sebastian Stags of the NCAA PH. He is known by his moniker "The Snatcher" in reference to his steals during games.

== Career ==
Arboleda first played for the Laguna Lakers in the MBA and later entered the PBA in 2000. He had short stints with the Pop Cola Panthers and the Tanduay Rhum Masters before joining the FedEx Express.

== Fan incident ==
On October 16, 2009, during his team's game against Smart Gilas at the Araneta Coliseum, specifically halfway in the second quarter, Arboleda was involved in an incident where he assaulted a paying spectator, Alain Katigbak, after the latter shouted profane words directed at him following his second flagrant foul against Gilas' Marnel "Mac" Baracael. As a result of the second flagrant foul, he was ejected from the court soon after.

Three days later, PBA Commissioner Sonny Barrios suspended him for the rest of the 2009–2010 season plus one game without pay, effective immediately, on top of any possible court case Katigbak would file against him as a result of the assault. The suspension is said to be the league's heaviest sanction to date. In addition, he was fined PhP20,000 for the two flagrant 1 fouls he committed, and was blacklisted from attending PBA games during the period of his suspension.

== PBA career statistics ==
Legend
GP	Games played	MPG	Minutes per game
FG%	Field-goal percentage	3P%	3-point field-goal percentage	FT%	Free-throw percentage
RPG	Rebounds per game	APG	Assists per game	SPG	Steals per game
BPG	Blocks per game	PPG	Points per game	**Bold**	Career high

=== Season-by-season averages ===
Year	Team	GP	MPG	FG%	3P%	FT%	RPG	APG	SPG	BPG	PPG
2000	Pop Cola	33	17.1	**.443**	.273	.571	1.7	1.6	.6	.1	3.2
2001	Tanduay	14	9.2	.132	.083	.700	1.4	.8	.1	.0	1.6
2002	FedEx	32	16.5	.416	.349	.806	2.2	2.1	1.3	.0	5.4
2003	FedEx	42	23.4	.416	.316	.750	3.5	2.6	1.9	**.2**	6.8
2004–05	FedEx	**59**	28.3	.363	.313	.717	4.4	5.0	1.6	.1	7.7
2005–06	Air21	51	**34.4**	.399	.343	.696	4.5	5.4	**2.1**	.1	10.4
2006–07	Air21	44	33.7	.355	.298	.681	**5.0**	**5.8**	1.8	.0	**10.6**
2007–08	Air21	49	32.3	.335	.283	.736	4.1	4.8	1.7	.1	10.0
2008–09	Air21 / Burger King	45	25.0	.385	.347	.712	3.5	3.9	1.4	.1	9.1
2009–10	Burger King / Air21	10	23.1	.366	.333	**.929**	2.8	2.7	1.1	**.2**	8.4
2010–11	Air21	38	21.2	.335	.306	.759	3.2	2.5	1.2	.1	6.1
2011–12	Barako Bull	40	22.2	.361	.341	.750	2.9	2.3	1.3	.1	5.5
2012–13	Air21	36	22.6	.372	.350	.667	3.2	2.4	.8	.1	5.3
2013–14	Air21	13	16.9	.205	.185	.714	1.7	1.0	.7	.0	2.0
2014–15	NLEX	20	7.5	.346	**.368**	.500	.6	.5	.1	.0	1.4
Career		526	24.6	.367	.316	.721	3.4	3.4	1.4	.1	7.1

== See also ==
- List of violent spectator incidents in sports
