= 2000 Batang Red Bull Energizers season =

2000 Batang Red Bull Thunder season
- Head coach: Yeng Guiao
- General Manager: Tony Chua
- Owner(s): Tony Chua

All-Filipino Cup results
- Record: 3–11 (21.4%)
- Place: N/A
- Playoff finish: N/A

Commissioner's Cup results
- Record: 3–6 (33.3%)
- Place: N/A
- Playoff finish: N/A

Governors Cup results
- Record: 10–5 (66.7%)
- Place: 2nd seed
- Playoff finish: Semis (lost to SMB, 3–1)

Batang Red Bull Thunder seasons

The 2000 Batang Red Bull Energizers season was the first season of the franchise in the Philippine Basketball Association (PBA). It changed its name to Batang Red Bull Thunder in the Governors' Cup.

== Expansion draft ==
Player	Previous team
Ato Agustin	Sta. Lucia Realtors
Glenn Capacio	Mobiline Phone Pals
Cris Bolado	San Miguel Beermen
Edmund Reyes	Purefoods TJ Hotdogs

== Transactions ==
Players Added

Via Draft

- Joseph Gumatay

Via Free Agency

- Ruel Buenaventura (From Alaska; the Milkmen acquired Buenaventura from Pop Cola)
- Mick Pennisi (Direct-hire recruit)
- Antero Saldaña

Elevated 6 players from their farm team Red Bull in the PBL

- Davonn Harp
- Kerby Raymundo
- Bernard Tanpua
- Jimwell Torion
- Lordy Tugade
- Junthy Valenzuela

== Occurrences ==
The Energizers had their first franchise victory on February 27 by scoring a 90-89 overtime win over Sta.Lucia, it was soon reversed when it was found out their rookie center, 18-year-old Kerby Raymundo had deficiency in academic credentials and ineligible to play in the pro league until next year, the PBA therefore forfeited two of their victories, including a repeat won game over Sta.Lucia on March 18 in Davao City.

== Roster ==
2000 Batang Red Bull Energizers roster
Players

Pos.	#	POB	Name	Height	Weight	DOB (YYYY–MM–DD)	From
G	3	(Philippines)	Jimwell Torion	5 ft 9 in (1.75 m)			SCSIT
F	4	(United States)	Davonn Harp	6 ft 4 in (1.93 m)			Kutztown
G	6	(Philippines)	Ato Agustin	5 ft 11 in (1.80 m)			Lyceum
F	7	(Australia)	Mick Pennisi	6 ft 9 in (2.06 m)			Eastern Michigan
F	10	(Philippines)	Junthy Valenzuela	6 ft 2 in (1.88 m)			SCSIT
G	11	(Philippines)	Joseph Gumatay	5 ft 10 in (1.78 m)			Philippines
G	12	(Philippines)	Glenn Capacio	6 ft 0 in (1.83 m)			Far Eastern
F	14	(Philippines)	Bernard Tanpua	6 ft 3 in (1.91 m)			UPHSD
F	15	(Philippines)	Lordy Tugade	6 ft 3 in (1.91 m)			National-U
C	16	(Philippines)	Ruel Buenaventura	6 ft 5 in (1.96 m)			UE
F	17	(Philippines)	Antero Saldaña	6 ft 3 in (1.91 m)			Letran
F	20	(Philippines)	Edmund Reyes	6 ft 3 in (1.91 m)			UST
C	21	(Philippines)	Kerby Raymundo (S)	6 ft 6 in (1.98 m)			Letran
C	24	(Philippines)	Cris Bolado	6 ft 7 in (2.01 m)			National-U
F	2	(United States)	Thaddeus Delaney (C)	6 ft 6 in (1.98 m)			College of Charleston
F		(United States)	Jack Hartman (C)	6 ft 5 in (1.96 m)
G	23	(United States)	Ray Tutt (C/G)	6 ft 2 in (1.88 m)

Coaches
Head coach
- (Philippines) Yeng Guiao
Assistant(s)
- (Philippines) Roehl Nadurata

Legend
- (DP) Unsigned draft pick
- (FA) Free agent
- (S) Suspended
- *(C) Commissioner's Cup Import
- *(G) Governor's Cup Import
- *(S) Suspended
- Injured

== Eliminations (Won games) ==
DATE	OPPONENT	SCORE	VENUE (Location)
March 22	Shell	70-66	Philsports Arena
April 26	Pop Cola	78-75	Philsports Arena
April 30	San Miguel	92-88	Araneta Coliseum
June 25	Purefoods	96-81	Araneta Coliseum
July 9	Brgy.Ginebra	103-99	Araneta Coliseum
July 28	Tanduay	86-70	Philsports Arena
October 1	Tanduay	94-90	Ynares Center
October 6	Pop Cola	100-95 OT	Philsports Arena
October 13	Brgy.Ginebra	91-86	Philsports Arena
October 21	San Miguel	98-92	Cebu City
October 25	Sta.Lucia	69-66	Philsports Arena
November 5	Alaska	92-78	Araneta Coliseum
November 8	Shell	118-103	Philsports Arena

All-Filipino Cup Commissioner's Cup Governor's Cup
