= 2000 Alaska Milkmen season =

- Head coach: Tim Cone
- General Manager: Joaqui Trillo
- Owner(s): Wilfred Uytengsu

All-Filipino Cup results
- Record: 18–6 (75%)
- Place: 3rd seed
- Playoff finish: Champions

Commissioner's Cup results
- Record: 7–7 (50%)
- Place: 4th seed
- Playoff finish: Semis (lost to SMB)

Governors Cup results
- Record: 6–5 (54.5%)
- Place: 5th seed
- Playoff finish: QF (lost to Purefoods)

Alaska Milkmen seasons

The 2000 Alaska Milkmen season was the 15th season of the franchise in the Philippine Basketball Association (PBA). It changed its name to Alaska Aces in the Governors' Cup.

== Transactions ==
Players Added

Via Draft

- Glen Peter Yap

Via Free Agency

- Dino Aldeguer (Pick by Purefoods TJ Hotdogs in the rookie draft)

Via Trade

- Bryan Gahol (From Shell Turbo Chargers in exchange for Brixter Encarnacion)
Players Lost

Via Free Agency

- Braulio Lim (To Purefoods TJ Hotdogs)

Via Trade

- Jojo Lastimosa (To Pop Cola Panthers)
- Roehl Gomez (To Pop Cola Panthers)
- Alaska acquired Brixter Encarnacion and Ruel Buenaventura from Pop Cola in a trade with Lastimosa and Gomez
- Buenaventura was shipped to newcomer Batang Red Bull for a future second round pick

== Championship ==
The Alaska Milkmen won the All-Filipino Cup title with a 4-1 series win over the Purefoods Tender Juicy Hotdogs. This was the third All-Filipino crown for Alaska in the last five seasons and winning every two years, first in 1996 and then in 1998.

== Roster ==
2000 Alaska Milkmen roster
Players

Pos.	#	POB	Name	Height	Weight	DOB (YYYY–MM–DD)	From
F	3	(Philippines)	Glen Peter Yap	6 ft 3 in (1.91 m)			Adamson
G	5	(Philippines)	Gilbert Reyes	5 ft 8 in (1.73 m)			Ateneo
C	8	(Philippines)	Don Allado	6 ft 6 in (1.98 m)			De La Salle
G	9	(Philippines)	Rodney Santos	6 ft 1 in (1.85 m)			San Sebastian
G	11	(Philippines)	Dino Aldeguer	5 ft 10 in (1.78 m)			De La Salle
G	14	(Philippines)	Johnny Abarrientos	5 ft 8 in (1.73 m)			Far Eastern
F	16	(Philippines)	Bong Hawkins	6 ft 4 in (1.93 m)			UPHSD
C	17	(Philippines)	Kevin Ramas	6 ft 6 in (1.98 m)			Mapúa
G/F	19	(Philippines)	Kenneth Duremdes	6 ft 3 in (1.91 m)			Adamson
F	21	(Philippines)	Bryan Gahol	6 ft 4 in (1.93 m)			Philippines
C	22	(United States)	James Walkvist	6 ft 9 in (2.06 m)
C	32	(Philippines)	Poch Juinio	6 ft 5 in (1.96 m)			Philippines
G/F	41	(Philippines)	Joey Loyzaga	6 ft 1 in (1.85 m)			San Beda
F/C	30	(United States)	Marcus Liberty (C)	6 ft 7 in (2.01 m)			Illinois
F	2	(United States)	Kirk King (C)	6 ft 6 in (1.98 m)			Connecticut
F	20	(United States)	Sean Chambers (G)	6 ft 0 in (1.83 m)			Cal Poly

Coaches
Head coach
- (United States) Tim Cone
Assistant(s)
- (Philippines) Gilbert Reyes
- (Philippines) Dickie Bachmann
- (Philippines) Luigi Trillo

Legend
- (DP) Unsigned draft pick
- (FA) Free agent
- (S) Suspended
- (C) Commissioner's Cup import
- (G) Governor's Cup import
- Injured

== Eliminations (Won games) ==
DATE	OPPONENT	SCORE	VENUE (Location)
February 25	Shell	67-64	Philsports Arena
March 12	Pop Cola	89-71	Araneta Coliseum
March 22	Purefoods	88-67	Philsports Arena
March 25	Shell	76-66	Ynares Center
March 31	Mobiline	91-76	Philsports Arena
April 2	Red Bull	91-73	Araneta Coliseum
April 8	Sta.Lucia	67-60	General Santos City
April 19	Brgy.Ginebra	81-75	Araneta Coliseum
April 30	Sta.Lucia	75-69	Araneta Coliseum
May 5	Pop Cola	81-71	Philsports Arena
July 2	Sunkist	90-82	Araneta Coliseum
July 8	Shell	99-98 OT	Ynares Center
July 16	Sta.Lucia	91-84	Araneta Coliseum
July 23	Mobiline	91-85	Araneta Coliseum
August 4	Red Bull	108-100	Philsports Arena
October 6	Tanduay	93-86	Philsports Arena
October 15	San Miguel	97-81	Araneta Coliseum
October 20	Pop Cola	101-86	Araneta Coliseum
October 28	Brgy.Ginebra	93-79	Dagupan City
November 12	Sta.Lucia	87-80	Araneta Coliseum

All-Filipino Cup Commissioner's Cup Governor's Cup
