= 2003 Red Bull Barako season =

- Head coach: Yeng Guiao
- General Manager: Tony Chua
- Owner(s): Tony Chua

All-Filipino Cup results
- Record: 15–6 (71.4%)
- Place: N/A
- Playoff finish: QF

Invitational Cup results
- Record: 3–3 (50%)
- Place: 4th
- Playoff finish: Semis (lost to Alaska)

Reinforced Conference results
- Record: 12–4 (75%)
- Place: N/A
- Playoff finish: QF (lost to TNT)

Red Bull Barako seasons

The 2003 Red Bull Barako season was the fourth season of the franchise in the Philippine Basketball Association (PBA). The team was known as Red Bull Barako starting the Invitational Conference.

== Occurrences ==
Red Bull Barako were tied with FedEx at 3–1 in the Group A standings of the Invitational Conference and gain the last berth in the crossover semifinals by way of a controversial ending in their game against Talk 'N Text, which the Phone Pals won 88–87, but needed to win by 8 points. The TNT players went to the extent of shooting on the Red Bull's goal while enjoying the lead in the closing seconds.

In the Reinforced Conference best-of-three quarterfinals series against Talk 'N Text, Red Bull lost in the deciding third game where guard Jimwell Torion put in a vicious clothesline on Phone Pal Jimmy Alapag with the outcome of the game beyond doubt, Torion's actions serve him an eight-month suspension.

== Roster ==
2003 Red Bull Barako roster
Players

Pos.	#	POB	Name	Height	Weight	DOB (YYYY–MM–DD)	From
G	3	(Philippines)	Jimwell Torion	5 ft 9 in (1.75 m)			SCSIT
F	4	(United States)	Davonn Harp	6 ft 4 in (1.93 m)			Kutztown
G	5	(Philippines)	Topex Robinson	5 ft 10 in (1.78 m)			San Sebastian
F	7	(Australia)	Mick Pennisi	6 ft 9 in (2.06 m)			Eastern Michigan
F	8	(Philippines)	Nelson Asaytono	6 ft 3 in (1.91 m)			Manila
F	10	(Philippines)	Junthy Valenzuela	6 ft 2 in (1.88 m)			SCSIT
G	11	(Philippines)	Willie Miller	5 ft 10 in (1.78 m)			Letran
G/F	12	(Philippines)	Vince Hizon	6 ft 2 in (1.88 m)			Ateneo
G	13	(Philippines)	Anton Villoria	5 ft 11 in (1.80 m)			Letran
F/C	14	(Philippines)	Enrico Villanueva	6 ft 5 in (1.96 m)			Ateneo
F	15	(Philippines)	Lordy Tugade	6 ft 3 in (1.91 m)			National-U
F	16	(Philippines)	Homer Se	6 ft 5 in (1.96 m)			San Sebastian
F	20	(Philippines)	Edmund Reyes	6 ft 3 in (1.91 m)			UST
G/F	23	(Philippines)	Cyrus Baguio	6 ft 2 in (1.88 m)			UST
C		(Philippines)	Rysal Castro	6 ft 7 in (2.01 m)			Far Eastern
F		(Philippines)	Erwin Velez	6 ft 3 in (1.91 m)			Letran
G		(United States)	Ramel Lloyd (I)	6 ft 3 in (1.91 m)			Long Beach State
C		(United States)	Scott Burrell (I)	6 ft 7 in (2.01 m)			Connecticut

Coaches

Head coach

- (Philippines) Yeng Guiao

Assistant coach(es)

- (Philippines) Roehl Nadurata
- (Philippines) Rudy Hines
- (Philippines) Joshua Villapando
- (Philippines) Alfredo Amador
- (Philippines) Tony Chua
- (Philippines) Andy Jao

Legend

- (C) Team captain
- (I) Import
- Injured

== Game results ==
=== All-Filipino Cup ===
Date	Opponent	Score	Top scorer	Venue	Location
February 28	FedEx	79–71	Miller (21 pts)	Makati Coliseum	Makati City
March 5	San Miguel	90–93		Philsports Arena	Pasig
March 12	Sta.Lucia	92–83		Philsports Arena	Pasig
March 16	Purefoods	98–90		Araneta Coliseum	Quezon City
March 21	Coca-Cola	80–79		Araneta Coliseum	Quezon City
March 26	Alaska	95–79		Makati Coliseum	Makati City
March 29	Talk 'N Text	94–88	Miller (21 pts)		Cebu City
April 4	San Miguel	96–93		Philsports Arena	Pasig
April 6	Shell			Philsports Arena	Pasig
April 13	Brgy.Ginebra	105–97		Philsports Arena	Pasig
April 20	Coca-Cola	102–94	Se (18 pts)	Araneta Coliseum	Quezon City
April 25	Talk 'N Text			Philsports Arena	Pasig
April 27	FedEx	78–81		Araneta Coliseum	Quezon City
May 2	Purefoods	105–86	Miller (30 pts)	Philsports Arena	Pasig
May 7	Sta.Lucia	89–95		Philsports Arena	Pasig
May 10	Alaska	92–82			Tagbilaran, Bohol
May 16	Brgy.Ginebra	101–83		Ynares Center	Antipolo City
May 21	Shell	108–104	Harp (29 pts)	Philsports Arena	Pasig

Win
Win via OT
loss
loss via OT
