= Rob Wainwright (basketball) =

Filipino-American basketball player

Personal information
- Born: December 27, 1973 (age 52) Vallejo, California, U.S.
- Listed height: 6 ft 5 in (1.96 m)
- Listed weight: 200 lb (91 kg)

Career information
- College: Solano CC
- PBA draft: 2000: Direct hire
- Drafted by: Sta. Lucia Realtors
- Playing career: 1998–2013
- Position: Small forward / shooting guard
- Coaching career: 2014–present

Career history

Playing
- 1998–1999: Cebu Gems
- 2000–2001: Sta. Lucia Realtors
- 2001–2002: Shell Turbo Chargers
- 2003–2006: Coca-Cola Tigers
- 2006–2009: Rain or Shine Elasto Painters
- 2009–2010: Philippine Patriots
- 2010–2011: Barako Bull Energy Boosters
- 2013: Saigon Heat

Coaching
- 2012–2014: Saigon Heat (assistant)
- 2014–2017: Kia Sorento / Kia Carnival / Mahindra Enforcer / Mahindra Floodbuster / Kia Picanto (assistant)
- 2018–2019: Davao Occidental Tigers (assistant)
- 2021: Rain or Shine Elasto Painters (assistant)
- 2023: Makati OKBet Kings (assistant)
- 2024–2025: Nueva Ecija Rice Vanguards (assistant)

Career highlights
- As a player: PBA champion (2003 Reinforced); ABL champion (2010)

Robert Adolfo Wainwright (born December 27, 1973) is a Filipino-American former professional basketball player who previously serves as the assistant coach of the Nueva Ecija Rice Vanguards of the Maharlika Pilipinas Basketball League (MPBL).

== Playing career ==
Wainwright was directly hired by Sta. Lucia Realtors in 2000 from the Cebu Gems where he was a star in the Metropolitan Basketball Association.

He played with the Realtors in 2000 before playing for the Shell Turbo Chargers from 2001 to 2002. In 2003, he was acquired by the Coca-Cola Tigers. After 4 years, Wainwright played for the Rain or Shine Elasto Painters from 2006 to 2009. He was instrumental in transforming Rain or Shine into title contenders.

In 2009, he helped the Philippine Patriots win the inaugural ASEAN Basketball League crown.

== Coaching career ==
Wainwright was signed by ABL club Saigon Heat 2012 as an assistant coach for the team.

In June 2014, Wainwright was signed by then-expansion team Kia Sorento as an assistant coach to head coach Manny Pacquiao.

== PBA career statistics ==
Legend
GP	Games played	MPG	Minutes per game
FG%	Field-goal percentage	3P%	3-point field-goal percentage	FT%	Free-throw percentage
RPG	Rebounds per game	APG	Assists per game	SPG	Steals per game
BPG	Blocks per game	PPG	Points per game	**Bold**	Career high

=== Season-by-season averages ===
Year	Team	GP	MPG	FG%	3P%	FT%	RPG	APG	SPG	BPG	PPG
2000	Sta. Lucia	22	25.9	**.434**	**.462**	.625	3.4	1.0	.5	.3	7.8
2001	Shell	49	**30.6**	.430	.308	.811	4.8	1.3	.5	.4	**12.6**
2002	Shell	24	18.3	.412	.322	**.824**	2.1	.7	.5	.4	8.0
2003	Coca-Cola	**65**	20.4	.404	.343	.800	3.1	.7	.5	.3	8.2
2004–05	Coca-Cola	60	22.0	.363	.315	.710	4.1	.8	.5	.2	6.8
2005–06	Coca-Cola	31	11.9	.320	.158	.600	2.2	.5	.1	.0	3.5
2006–07	Welcoat	29	29.5	.369	.376	.735	**6.9**	.9	.2	.3	9.3
2007–08	Welcoat	34	29.5	.421	.370	.732	5.4	.8	**.7**	.5	9.7
2008–09	Rain or Shine	43	26.7	.361	.328	.697	4.6	**1.4**	.5	**.6**	9.9
2009–10	Barako Energy Coffee	14	24.4	.345	.303	.778	3.9	.4	.4	.4	7.9
2010–11	Barako Bull	12	25.1	.342	.333	.300	3.4	**1.4**	.4	.3	5.9
Career		383	24.0	.391	.333	.734	4.1	.9	.5	.4	8.4
