= 2004–05 Red Bull Barako season =

- Head coach: Yeng Guiao
- General manager: Tony Chua
- Owner: Tony Chua

Fiesta Conference (Transition) results
- Record: 16–13 (55.2%)
- Place: 2nd
- Playoff finish: Runner-up

Philippine Cup results
- Record: 6–13 (31.6%)
- Place: 10th
- Playoff finish: Wildcard

Fiesta Conference results
- Record: 14–14 (50%)
- Place: 4th
- Playoff finish: Semifinals

Red Bull Barako seasons

The 2004–2005 Red Bull Barako season was the 5th season of the franchise in the Philippine Basketball Association (PBA).

== Draft picks ==
Round	Pick	Player	Nationality	College
1	6	Denver Lopez	United States	Cal State Fullerton
2	16	Francis Mercado	Philippines	San Beda College

== Roster ==
2004–05 Red Bull Barako roster
Players

Pos.	#	POB	Name	Height	Weight	DOB (YYYY–MM–DD)	From
G	3	(Philippines)	Jimwell Torion	5 ft 9 in (1.75 m)			SCSIT
F	4	(United States)	Davonn Harp	6 ft 4 in (1.93 m)			Kutztown
G	4	(Philippines)	Warren Ybañez	5 ft 8 in (1.73 m)			PSBA
G	5	(Philippines)	Topex Robinson	5 ft 8 in (1.73 m)			San Sebastian
F	7	(Australia)	Mick Pennisi	6 ft 9 in (2.06 m)			Eastern Michigan
G	9	(Philippines)	Gherome Ejercito	6 ft 2 in (1.88 m)			Adamson
F	10	(Philippines)	Junthy Valenzuela	6 ft 2 in (1.88 m)			SCSIT
F	11	(Philippines)	Nelson Asaytono	6 ft 3 in (1.91 m)			Manila
F/C	14	(Philippines)	Enrico Villanueva	6 ft 5 in (1.96 m)			Ateneo
F	15	(Philippines)	Lordy Tugade	6 ft 3 in (1.91 m)			National-U
F	18	(Philippines)	Vergel Meneses	6 ft 2 in (1.88 m)			José Rizal
F	21	(Philippines)	Bryan Gahol	6 ft 4 in (1.93 m)			Philippines
G/F	23	(Philippines)	Cyrus Baguio	6 ft 2 in (1.88 m)			UST
C	35	(Philippines)	Edward Joseph Feihl	7 ft 1 in (2.16 m)			Adamson
G		(United States)	Jon Ordonio	6 ft 3 in (1.91 m)			Master's
F		(Philippines)	Paul Alvarez	6 ft 0 in (1.83 m)			San Sebastian

Coaches

Head coach

- (Philippines) Yeng Guiao

Assistant coach(es)

- (Philippines) Roehl Nadurata
- (Philippines) Gee Abanilla

Legend

- (C) Team captain
- Injured

== Philippine Cup ==
=== Game log ===
2005 PBA Philippine Cup game log
October

Game	Date	Opponent	Score	High points	High rebounds	High assists	Location Attendance	Record
1	October 8	FedEx	95–102	Harp (26)			Makati Coliseum	0–1
2	October 12	Shell	86–93				Cagayan de Oro	0–2
3	October 15	Purefoods	101-81	Tugade (25)			Philsports Arena	1–2
4	October 20	Alaska	71–79	Villanueva (19)			Araneta Coliseum	1–3
5	October 26	Sta.Lucia	124-118 (3OT)				Bacolod	2–3
6	October 29	San Miguel	82–93				Araneta Coliseum	2–4

November

Game	Date	Opponent	Score	High points	High rebounds	High assists	Location Attendance	Record
7	November 7	Brgy.Ginebra	94–100				Araneta Coliseum	2–5
8	November 10	Shell	94-90	Tugade (20)			Araneta Coliseum	3–5
10	November 17	Coca Cola	88–101				Araneta Coliseum	3–7

December

Game	Date	Opponent	Score	High points	High rebounds	High assists	Location Attendance	Record
13	December 8	Talk 'N Text	105-96	Villanueva (30) Asaytono (29)			Philsports Arena	6–7
14	December 12	Coca Cola	96–102	Villanueva (30)			Araneta Coliseum	6–8
15	December 14	Purefoods	88–92	Villanueva (23)			Cavite City	6–9
16	December 17	Brgy.Ginebra	89–107	Torion (24)			Ynares Center	6–10
17	December 22	Sta.Lucia	84–105	Tugade (17)			Philsports Arena	6–11
18	December 14	San Miguel	78–92	Baguio (20)			Cuneta Astrodome	6–12

2004–05 schedule

== Transactions ==
=== Trades ===
Traded	to	For
Homer Se	FedEx Express ^{September 2004}	Vergel Meneses
Denver Lopez	FedEx Express ^{February 2005}	Bryan Gahol

=== Additions ===
Player	Signed	Former team
Oliver Agapito	2004–05 Philippine Cup	
Ryan Bernardo	2004–05 Philippine Cup	FedEx Express
Larry Rodriguez	2004–05 Philippine Cup	
Jovie Sese	2004–05 Philippine Cup	
Rolly Basilides	2004–05 Philippine Cup	
Paul Alvarez	2004–05 Philippine Cup	
Angelo David	2004–05 Philippine Cup	

== Recruited imports ==
Tournament	Name	#	Height	From	GP
2004 PBA Fiesta Conference	Carlos Wheeler		6 ft 6 in (1.98 m)	Campbellsville	1
2004 PBA Fiesta Conference	Bingo Merriex		6 ft 6 in (1.98 m)	Texas Christian	2
2004 PBA Fiesta Conference	Doug Wrenn		6 ft 8 in (2.03 m)	University of Washington	1
2004 PBA Fiesta Conference	DeAngelo Collins		6 ft 9 in (2.06 m)	Inglewood	4
2004 PBA Fiesta Conference	Cory Hightower		6 ft 8 in (2.03 m)	Indian Hills	2
2004 PBA Fiesta Conference	Victor Thomas	77	6 ft 7 in (2.01 m)	La Salle University	18
2005 PBA Fiesta Conference	Dalron Johnson		6 ft 9 in (2.06 m)	UNLV	14
2005 PBA Fiesta Conference	Earl Barron	30	7 ft 0 in (2.13 m)	Memphis State	14

^{GP – Games played}
