= Junthy Valenzuela =

Filipino basketball player (born 1979)

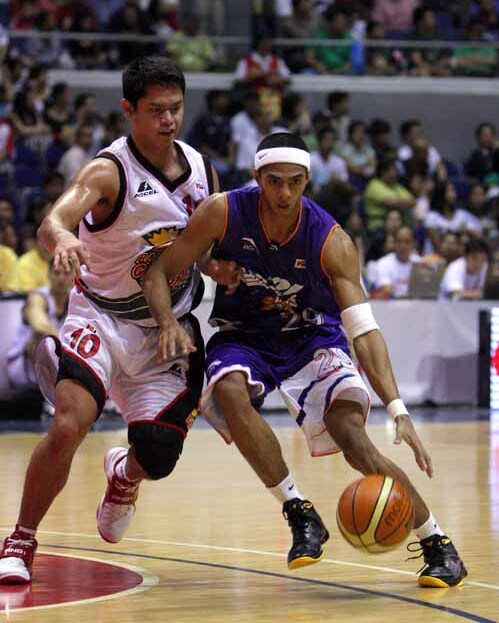
- Valenzuela (left) with the Barangay Ginebra Kings in 2008

Cebu Greats
- Title: Assistant coach
- League: MPBL

Personal information
- Born: June 5, 1979 (age 47) Bogo, Cebu, Philippines
- Listed height: 6 ft 3 in (1.91 m)
- Listed weight: 190 lb (86 kg)

Career information
- College: Salazar Tech
- PBA draft: 2000: Elevated
- Drafted by: Batang Red Bull Energizers
- Playing career: 2000–2010
- Position: Shooting guard / small forward
- Coaching career: 2014–2015; 2025–present

Career history

Playing
- 2000–2008: Batang Red Bull Energizers / Batang Red Bull Thunder / Red Bull Barako
- 2008–2010: Barangay Ginebra Kings

Coaching
- 2014–2015: USC Warriors
- 2025: Cebu Greats
- 2026–present: Cebu Greats (assistant)

Career highlights
- 4x PBA champion (2001 Commissioner's, 2002 Commissioner's, 2005-06 Fiesta, 2008 Fiesta); 2× PBA All-Star (2004, 2008); PBA All-Defensive Team (2005); CESAFI champion (2015)

Junthy Valenzuela (born June 5, 1979) is a Filipino basketball coach and former player who serves as assistant coach for the Cebu Greats of the Maharlika Pilipinas Basketball League (MPBL). Before coaching, Valenzuela played professional basketball in the Philippine Basketball Association (PBA), when he was elevated directly from the Philippine Basketball League, by the then-expansion team Red Bull Barako.

On April 14, 2008, he was traded by the Red Bull Barako to the Barangay Ginebra Kings in exchange for a 2009 second round pick and a 2010 first round draft pick.

After his PBA career came to an end, Valenzuela returned to Cebu to coach the University of San Carlos Warriors men's basketball team in the Cebu Schools Athletic Foundation, Inc. (CESAFI), where he, as head coach, led the team to the 2014 CESAFI finals for the first time since 2007. He resigned as head coach in 2015 to manage his business in Asturias, Cebu. Valenzuela returned to coaching in organized basketball in 2025 after being tapped to coach the Cebu Greats of the Maharlika Pilipinas Basketball League (MPBL).

== PBA career statistics ==
Legend
GP	Games played	MPG	Minutes per game
FG%	Field-goal percentage	3P%	3-point field-goal percentage	FT%	Free-throw percentage
RPG	Rebounds per game	APG	Assists per game	SPG	Steals per game
BPG	Blocks per game	PPG	Points per game	**Bold**	Career high

=== Season-by-season averages ===
Year	Team	GP	MPG	FG%	3P%	FT%	RPG	APG	SPG	BPG	PPG
2000	Red Bull	36	14.4	.366	.222	.391	2.1	.8	.6	.1	3.8
2001	Red Bull	50	23.7	**.437**	.345	.712	2.7	1.1	.5	**.2**	8.2
2002	Red Bull	41	18.2	.359	.342	.689	2.1	2.1	.8	**.2**	6.3
2003	Red Bull	40	20.3	.390	.278	.771	2.8	1.7	.6	.1	6.1
2004–05	Red Bull	66	20.5	.431	.220	.677	3.1	2.4	.7	.1	7.5
2005–06	Red Bull	**67**	20.6	.403	.194	.613	3.1	2.9	.7	**.2**	7.0
2006–07	Red Bull	49	23.4	.417	**.351**	.766	3.8	**3.3**	.6	.1	**11.9**
2007–08	Red Bull	55	**26.2**	.416	.271	.706	**4.4**	2.7	**.9**	**.2**	11.8
2007–08	Barangay Ginebra	55	**26.2**	.416	.271	.706	**4.4**	2.7	**.9**	**.2**	11.8
2008–09	Barangay Ginebra	12	17.5	.312	.259	**.778**	3.1	1.7	.6	—	5.9
2009–10	Barangay Ginebra	1	2.0	.000	.000	—	—	1.0	—	—	—
Career		417	21.1	.407	.287	.698	3.1	2.3	.7	.1	8.0
