= 2000 Sta. Lucia Realtors season =

- Head coach: Norman Black
- Owner: Sta. Lucia Realty and Development Corporation

All-Filipino Cup results
- Record: 7–9 (43.8%)
- Place: 5th seed
- Playoff finish: QF (lost to Purefoods)

Commissioner's Cup results
- Record: 11–8 (57.9%)
- Place: 2nd seed
- Playoff finish: Runner-up

Governor's Cup results
- Record: 4–6 (40%)
- Place: 7th seed
- Playoff finish: QF (lost to Red Bull)

Sta. Lucia Realtors seasons

The 2000 Sta. Lucia Realtors season was the 8th season of the franchise in the Philippine Basketball Association (PBA).

== Transactions ==
Players added

Via draft

- Paolo Mendoza

Via free agency

- Angelo David (from the MBA; played for Sta. Lucia in 1997)
- Anastacio Mendoza (from Mobiline)
- Chris Tan (undrafted)
- Rob Wainwright (from the MBA)

Via trade

- Benito Cheng (from Barangay Ginebra Kings)
- Marlou Aquino (from Barangay Ginebra Kings)
Players lost

Via expansion draft

- Ato Agustin (taken by Red Bull)

Via trade

- Aramis Calpito (to Barangay Ginebra Kings)
- Jun Limpot (to Barangay Ginebra Kings)

== Finals stint ==
Under new head coach Norman Black, who moved from Pop Cola to Sta. Lucia at the beginning of the season, the Realtors played in the PBA championship series for the first time in their eight-year history during the Commissioner's Cup. Sta. Lucia lost to defending champions San Miguel Beermen in five games.

== Roster ==
2000 Sta. Lucia Realtors roster
Players

Pos.	#	POB	Name	Height	Weight	DOB (YYYY–MM–DD)	From
G	1	(Philippines)	Chris Tan	6 ft 1 in (1.85 m)			De La Salle
G	4	(Philippines)	Gerardo Santiago	5 ft 10 in (1.78 m)			Mapúa
G	5	(Philippines)	Ronnie Magsanoc	5 ft 9 in (1.75 m)			Philippines
C	7	(Philippines)	Richard del Rosario	6 ft 5 in (1.96 m)			De La Salle
G	8	(Philippines)	Paolo Mendoza	5 ft 11 in (1.80 m)			Philippines
G/F	11	(Philippines)	Gerard Francisco	6 ft 3 in (1.91 m)			UST
C	13	(Philippines)	Marlou Aquino	6 ft 9 in (2.06 m)			Adamson
F	15	(Philippines)	Expedito Falcasantos	6 ft 4 in (1.93 m)			Cebu
F/C	16	(Philippines)	Dennis Espino	6 ft 6 in (1.98 m)			UST
F	17	(Philippines)	Michael Orquillas	6 ft 2 in (1.88 m)			Cebu
F	18	(Philippines)	Benny Cheng	6 ft 3 in (1.91 m)			Mapúa
G		(Philippines)	Anastacio Mendoza	5 ft 9 in (1.75 m)			Far Eastern
G	33	(United States)	Rob Wainwright	6 ft 5 in (1.96 m)			Solano CC
C	38	(Philippines)	Angelo David	6 ft 6 in (1.98 m)			Far Eastern
F	2	(United States)	Ansu Sesay (C)	6 ft 7 in (2.01 m)			Mississippi
G/F	3	(United States)	Joe Temple (G)	6 ft 3 in (1.91 m)			San Diego
G/F		(United States)	Isaac Fontaine (G)	6 ft 4 in (1.93 m)			Washington State

Coaches
Head coach
- (United States) Norman Black
Assistant(s)
- (Philippines) Franz Pumaren
- (Philippines) Adonis Tierra

Legend
- (DP) Unsigned draft pick
- (FA) Free agent
- (S) Suspended
- (C) Commissioner's Cup import
- (G) Governor's Cup import
- Injured

== Eliminations (won games) ==
Date	Opponent	Score	Venue (location)
February 23	Pop Cola	83-73	Philsports Arena
February 27	Red Bull	89-90 OT *	Araneta Coliseum
March 5	Shell	80-75	Araneta Coliseum
March 18	Red Bull	*	Davao City
March 24	Brgy.Ginebra	67-54	Philsports Arena
April 16	Mobiline	88-84	Araneta Coliseum
June 25	Shell	94-83	Araneta Coliseum
July 1	Mobiline	94-68	Lipa City, Batangas
July 7	Red Bull	89-88	Philsports Arena
July 22	San Miguel	75-69	Ynares Center
July 26	Sunkist	75-70	Philsports Arena
August 2	Tanduay	79-76	Philsports Arena
October 4	Mobiline	80-77	Philsports Arena
October 8	Brgy.Ginebra	99-93	Araneta Coliseum
October 20	Shell	82-69	Araneta Coliseum
November 19	Pop Cola	105-86	Araneta Coliseum

_{(*) Loss was reversed and changed to a win.}

All-Filipino Cup Commissioner's Cup Governor's Cup
