= Don Camaso =

Filipino basketball player

Celedon Camaso
Personal information
- Born: March 16, 1973 (age 53) Caloocan, Rizal
- Listed height: 6 ft 6 in (1.98 m)
- Listed weight: 200 lb (91 kg)

Career information
- College: Metro Manila College
- PBA draft: 2000: Direct Hire
- Drafted by: Mobiline Cellulars
- Playing career: 1999–2011
- Position: Power forward / small forward

Career history
- 1999: Manila Metrostars
- 2000–2002: Mobiline Cellulars / Talk 'N Text Phone Pals
- 2003: Alaska Aces
- 2004–2005: Talk 'N Text Phone Pals
- 2005–2007: Purefoods Chunkee Giants
- 2007–2008: Red Bull Barako
- 2009–2010: Brunei Barracudas
- 2010–2011: Satria Muda BritAma

Career highlights
- 2× PBA champion (2003 Invitational, 2006 Philippine); PBA All-Star Weekend Slam Dunk Contest champion (2000)

Celedon Camaso (born March 16, 1973) is a Filipino retired professional basketball player. He previously played for numerous teams in the Philippine Basketball Association. He was directly taken by Mobiline in 2000.

== Player profile ==
Camaso who started playing for the Manila Metrostars in the Metropolitan Basketball Association during the 1999 season of the league and he won the championship with Romel Adducul, Alex Compton, Ruben dela Rosa, etc.

Camaso is a forward who started his PBA career with the Talk 'N Text Phone Pals. He was most notable for winning the 1998 ABC-PBA and 1998 PBA Slam Dunk contests. He was traded to Red Bull in part of the Romel Adducul deal. He was waived by the Red Bull Barako in the 2008 PBA Fiesta Conference.

He is currently playing for the Judiciary Magis in the UNTV Cup. He is with the team since the inaugural 2013 season, where they became the first UNTV Cup champions.

He played for the Brunei Barracudas at the newly established ASEAN Basketball League from 2009–10. He was signed as an import by the Satria Muda BritAma of Indonesia for the 2010–11 season.

== PBA career statistics ==
Legend
GP	Games played	MPG	Minutes per game
FG%	Field-goal percentage	3P%	3-point field-goal percentage	FT%	Free-throw percentage
RPG	Rebounds per game	APG	Assists per game	SPG	Steals per game
BPG	Blocks per game	PPG	Points per game	**Bold**	Career high

=== Season-by-season averages ===
Year	Team	GP	MPG	FG%	3P%	FT%	RPG	APG	SPG	BPG	PPG
2000	Mobiline	41	24.3	.442	.323	.679	4.2	.7	.3	.5	9.2
2001	Mobiline / Talk 'N Text	40	**26.7**	.403	.364	.667	**4.7**	**.8**	.3	**.7**	**9.7**
2002	Talk 'N Text	16	13.4	**.463**	**.387**	.625	2.3	.5	.1	.2	5.8
2003	Alaska	44	17.4	.374	.317	.735	3.6	.5	**.4**	.4	6.5
2004–05	Talk 'N Text	**62**	13.2	.355	.200	.814	3.3	.4	.2	.4	4.7
2005–06	Purefoods	4	5.5	.143	.000	**1.000**	1.0	.3	.0	.3	1.0
2006–07	Purefoods	23	9.2	.397	.214	.500	2.0	.2	.3	.2	2.7
2006–07	Red Bull	23	9.2	.397	.214	.500	2.0	.2	.3	.2	2.7
2007–08	Red Bull	5	9.6	.294	.167	.600	1.6	.2	.0	.2	2.8
Career		235	17.6	.398	.288	.719	3.5	.5	.3	.4	6.5
