= 2000 Pop Cola Panthers season =

- Head coach: Chot Reyes
- General Manager: Elmer Yanga
- Owner(s): RFM Corporation

All-Filipino Cup results
- Record: 6–9 (40%)
- Place: 6th seed
- Playoff finish: QF (lost to Alaska)

Commissioner's Cup results
- Record: 4–6 (40%)
- Place: 7th seed
- Playoff finish: QF (lost to Sta.Lucia)

Governor's Cup results
- Record: 2–7 (22.2%)
- Place: N/A
- Playoff finish: N/A

Pop Cola Panthers seasons

The 2000 Pop Cola Panthers season was the 11th season of the franchise in the Philippine Basketball Association (PBA). Known as Pop Cola 800s in the All-Filipino Cup and Sunkist Orange Juicers in the Commissioner's Cup.

== Transactions ==
Players Added

Via Draft

- Mark Steven Victoria

Via Free Agency

- Wynne Arboleda (From the MBA)
- Estong Ballesteros (From the MBA)
- Billy Reyes

Via Trade

- Jojo Lastimosa (From Alaska)
- Roehl Gomez (From Alaska)
Players Lost

Via Free Agency

- Marcelino Morelos
- Jasper Ocampo

Via Trade

- Ruel Buenaventura (To Red Bull; originally traded to Alaska)
- Brixter Encarnacion (To Shell; originally traded to Alaska)
- Zaldy Realubit (To Tanduay during the Governor's Cup for two second round draft picks)

== Occurrences ==
Coach Chot Reyes, whose last coaching stint in the PBA was with Sta. Lucia in 1997, was named the new Pop Cola head coach at the start of the season, he replaces Norman Black, who has moved over to Sta.Lucia Realtors. The Pop Cola coaching staff was completed with the hiring of assistant coaches Binky Favis and former MBA mentor Biboy Ravanes. The team's original choice as Reyes' deputy, Aric del Rosario, choose to concentrate on other fields. Chot's brother Mike was also added as video coordinator assistant coach.

== Roster ==
2000 Pop Cola Panthers roster
Players

Pos.	#	POB	Name	Height	Weight	DOB (YYYY–MM–DD)	From
F	2	(United States)	Ali Peek	6 ft 4 in (1.93 m)			Saint Mary's
G	4	(Philippines)	Wynne Arboleda	5 ft 11 in (1.80 m)			MLQU
G	5	(Philippines)	Roehl Gomez	6 ft 0 in (1.83 m)			Cebu
F	6	(Philippines)	Noli Locsin	6 ft 3 in (1.91 m)			De La Salle
G		(Philippines)	Billy Reyes	5 ft 10 in (1.78 m)			UST
G	10	(United States)	Jon Ordonio	6 ft 2 in (1.88 m)			Master's
F	11	(Philippines)	Nelson Asaytono	6 ft 3 in (1.91 m)			Manila
F	16	(Philippines)	Estong Ballesteros	6 ft 3 in (1.91 m)			UST
F	19	(Philippines)	Marc Victoria	6 ft 3 in (1.91 m)			Far Eastern
F	22	(Philippines)	Henry Fernandez	6 ft 1 in (1.85 m)			Visayas
G	33	(Philippines)	Jojo Lastimosa	6 ft 0 in (1.83 m)			USJ–R
G	34	(United States)	William Antonio	6 ft 3 in (1.91 m)			Chaminade
C	35	(Philippines)	Zaldy Realubit (M)	6 ft 6 in (1.98 m)			USJ–R
F	30	(United States)	Carl Thomas (C)	6 ft 7 in (2.01 m)			College of Charleston
G	3	(United States)	Harold Ellis (C)	6 ft 3 in (1.91 m)			Morehouse
G/F	7	(United States)	Sean Green (G)	6 ft 4 in (1.93 m)			Iona
F	32	(United States)	Cedric McCullough (G)	6 ft 4 in (1.93 m)			Northern Iowa
G		(United States)	Bryatt Vann (G)	6 ft 3 in (1.91 m)			Oklahoma

Coaches
Head coach
- (Philippines) Chot Reyes
Assistant(s)
- (Philippines) Binky Favis
- (Philippines) Biboy Ravanes
- (Philippines) Mike Reyes

Legend
- (DP) Unsigned draft pick
- (FA) Free agent
- (S) Suspended
- (C) Commissioner's Cup import
- (G) Governor's Cup import
- *(M) Moved to Tanduay
- Injured

== Eliminations (Won games) ==
DATE	OPPONENT	SCORE	VENUE (Location)
March 3	Brgy.Ginebra	58-56	Philsports Arena
March 8	Purefoods	76-75	Araneta Coliseum
April 5	Tanduay	63-55	Philsports Arena
April 12	Purefoods	88-79	Philsports Arena
April 15	Red Bull	87-72	San Fernando, Pampanga
April 23	Mobiline	77-75	Araneta Coliseum
July 7	Tanduay	85-84	Philsports Arena
July 14	Purefoods	94-92	Philsports Arena
July 19	Shell	86-77	Philsports Arena
July 22	Red Bull	90-83	Ynares Center
October 1	Shell	97-78	Ynares Center
October 11	Purefoods	92-84	Philsports Arena

All-Filipino Cup Commissioner's Cup Governor's Cup
