= 2000 Barangay Ginebra Kings season =

- Head coach: Allan Caidic
- General manager: Casiano Cabalan, Jr; Ira Maniquis (second half of 2000)
- Owner: Danding Cojuangco

All-Filipino Cup results
- Record: 5–10 (33.3%)
- Place: 8th seed
- Playoff finish: QF (lost to Tanduay)

Commissioner's Cup results
- Record: 4–6 (40%)
- Place: 8th seed
- Playoff finish: QF (lost to SMB)

Governors Cup results
- Record: 5–6 (45.5%)
- Place: 8th seed
- Playoff finish: QF (lost to Mobiline)

Barangay Ginebra Kings seasons

The 2000 Barangay Ginebra Kings season was the 22nd season of the franchise in the Philippine Basketball Association (PBA).

== Transactions ==
Players Added

Via Free Agency

- Alex Crisano (From the MBA)
- Ronald Magtulis (From the MBA)
- Jayjay Helterbrand (Direct-hire recruit; played one game in the MBA)

Via Trade

- Aramis Calpito (From Sta. Lucia Realtors)
- Jun Limpot (From Sta. Lucia Realtors)
Players Lost

Via Retirement

- Allan Caidic

Via Free Agency

- Jolly Escobar

Via Trade

- Marlou Aquino (To Sta. Lucia Realtors)
- Benito Cheng (To Sta. Lucia Realtors)

== Occurrences ==
Casiano "Jun" Cabalan, Jr. served as general manager of the team until the first half to focus as representative to the board. Cabalan was replaced by Ira Maniquis in the second half of 2000 season.

== Roster ==
2000 Barangay Ginebra Kings roster
Players

Pos.	#	POB	Name	Height	Weight	DOB (YYYY–MM–DD)	From
G	1	(Philippines)	Bal David	5 ft 9 in (1.75 m)			UST
F	2	(Philippines)	Vergel Meneses	6 ft 2 in (1.88 m)			José Rizal
G/F	3	(Philippines)	Elmer Lago	6 ft 2 in (1.88 m)			De La Salle
G	4	(Philippines)	Merwin Castelo	6 ft 2 in (1.88 m)			San Beda
F/C	9	(Philippines)	Jun Limpot	6 ft 6 in (1.98 m)			De La Salle
F/C	12	(Philippines)	Yves Dignadice	6 ft 4 in (1.93 m)			USLS
G	13	(Philippines)	Jayjay Helterbrand	6 ft 0 in (1.83 m)			Kentucky State
C	14	(Philippines)	Aramis Calpito	6 ft 5 in (1.96 m)			San Sebastian
G	15	(Philippines)	Edward Naron	6 ft 1 in (1.85 m)			Visayas
C	18	(Philippines)	Wilmer Ong	6 ft 4 in (1.93 m)			USLS
F	33	(Philippines)	Teodoro Valera	6 ft 2 in (1.88 m)			UST
C	43	(United States)	Alex Crisano	6 ft 7 in (2.01 m)			Brooklyn
F	44	(Philippines)	Ronald Magtulis	6 ft 3 in (1.91 m)			Far Eastern
C	24	(United States)	Ryan Fletcher (C)	6 ft 7 in (2.01 m)			Cincinnati
F		(United States)	Roy Hammonds (G)	6 ft 5 in (1.96 m)			San José State
G	6	(United States)	Bryan Green (G)	6 ft 2 in (1.88 m)			Nevada

Coaches
Head coach
- (Philippines) Allan Caidic
Assistant(s)
- (Philippines) Cris Calilan
- (United States) Ron Jacobs

Legend
- (DP) Unsigned draft pick
- (FA) Free agent
- (S) Suspended
- (C) Commissioner's Cup import
- (G) Governor's Cup import
- Injured

== Eliminations (Won games) ==
Date	Opponent	Score	Venue (Location)
February 20	Red Bull	83-77	Araneta Coliseum
February 27	Mobiline	77-76	Araneta Coliseum
March 17	Alaska	78-71	Philsports Arena
April 12	Red Bull	100-80	Philsports Arena
May 5	Mobiline	73-67	Philsports Arena
July 21	Alaska	100-99	Philsports Arena
July 26	Shell	71-64	Philsports Arena
July 28	Sunkist	115-114 OT	Philsports Arena
August 4	Sta.Lucia	89-83	Philsports Arena
October 18	Purefoods	101-90	Ynares Center
November 5	Mobiline	92-76	Araneta Coliseum
November 8	Pop Cola	79-73	Philsports Arena
November 12	Shell	80-78	Araneta Coliseum

All-Filipino Cup Commissioner's Cup Governor's Cup
