= 2000 Shell Velocity season =

- Head coach: Perry Ronquillo

All-Filipino Cup results
- Record: 5–9 (35.7%)
- Place: 9th
- Playoff finish: Eliminated

Commissioner's Cup results
- Record: 3–6 (33.3%)
- Place: N/A
- Playoff finish: N/A

Governor's Cup results
- Record: 1–8 (11.1%)
- Place: N/A
- Playoff finish: N/A

Shell Velocity seasons

The 2000 Shell Velocity season was the 16th season of the franchise in the Philippine Basketball Association (PBA). It changed its name to Shell Turbo Chargers in the Governors' Cup.

== Transactions ==
Players Added

Via Free Agency

- Anthony Dela Cruz (Direct-hire recruit last season)
- Arthur Del Rosario (From the MBA)
- Dale Singson (From the MBA)

Via Trade

- Brixter Encarnacion (From Alaska for newly acquired Bryan Gahol; part of the Pablo-Telan deal)
- Mark Telan (From Mobiline; three-team trade with Jeffrey Cariaso moving to Tanduay)
Players Lost

Via Trade

- Noy Castillo (To Purefoods)
- Victor Pablo (To Mobiline)

== Roster ==
2000 Shell Velocity roster
Players

Pos.	#	POB	Name	Height	Weight	DOB (YYYY–MM–DD)	From
F	3	(United States)	Chris Jackson	6 ft 4 in (1.93 m)			San Bernardino Valley
F	5	(Philippines)	Brixter Encarnacion	6 ft 4 in (1.93 m)			San Sebastian
G	6	(Philippines)	Arnold Rodriguez	6 ft 1 in (1.85 m)			PUP
F	9	(Philippines)	Jay Mendoza	6 ft 3 in (1.91 m)			Mapúa
C	11	(Philippines)	Erwin Luna	6 ft 7 in (2.01 m)			Adamson
G	12	(Philippines)	Porferio Marzan	6 ft 2 in (1.88 m)			Baguio
F	13	(Philippines)	Mark Telan	6 ft 7 in (2.01 m)			De La Salle
C	14	(Philippines)	Benjie Paras	6 ft 5 in (1.96 m)			Philippines
F	19	(Philippines)	Joel Dualan	6 ft 3 in (1.91 m)			Manila
G	30	(Philippines)	Gerry Esplana	6 ft 0 in (1.83 m)			Far Eastern
G	31	(United States)	Rommel Santos	5 ft 11 in (1.80 m)			Staten Island
C	34	(Philippines)	Arthur Del Rosario	6 ft 5 in (1.96 m)
G	35	(United States)	Tony Dela Cruz	6 ft 5 in (1.96 m)			UC Irvine
G	50	(Philippines)	Dale Singson	6 ft 0 in (1.83 m)			UST
G/F	25	(United States)	John Best (C)	6 ft 5 in (1.96 m)			Tennessee Tech
G	23	(United States)	John Morton (G)	6 ft 3 in (1.91 m)			Seton Hall
G	15	(United States)	James Brewer (G)	6 ft 3 in (1.91 m)			Louisville

Coaches
Head coach
- (Philippines) Perry Ronquillo
Assistant(s)
- (Philippines) Joey Guanio

Legend
- (DP) Unsigned draft pick
- (FA) Free agent
- (S) Suspended
- (C) Commissioner's Cup import
- (G) Governor's Cup import
- Injured

== Eliminations (Won games) ==
DATE	OPPONENT	SCORE	VENUE (Location)
March 17	Purefoods	69-59	Philsports Arena
March 29	Pop Cola	75-67	Philsports Arena
April 2	Brgy.Ginebra	78-74	Araneta Coliseum
April 7	Red Bull	79-78	Philsports Arena
April 14	Mobiline	73-72	Philsports Arena
June 30	Red Bull	89-80	Ynares Center
July 5	Purefoods	90-89	Philsports Arena
July 30	Mobiline		Araneta Coliseum
October 11	Alaska	91-77	Philsports Arena

All-Filipino Cup Commissioner's Cup Governor's Cup
