= Paolo Mendoza =

Filipino basketball player

Personal information
- Born: April 22, 1978 (age 48) Quezon City, Metro Manila
- Listed height: 5 ft 11 in (1.80 m)
- Listed weight: 170 lb (77 kg)

Career information
- High school: UPIS (Quezon City)
- College: UP
- PBA draft: 2000: 1st round1st overall
- Drafted by: Sta. Lucia Realtors
- Playing career: 2000–2011
- Position: Point guard
- Number: 8

Career history

Playing
- 2000-2010: Sta. Lucia Realtors
- 2010-2011: Powerade Tigers

Coaching
- 2013-2023: UPIS

Career highlights
- 2× PBA champion (2001 Governors', 2007–08 Philippine); PBA Sportsmanship Award (2002); PBL Most Valuable Player (1999-00 2nd Yakult Challenge)

Paolo Mendoza (born April 22, 1978) in Quezon City, Metro Manila, Philippines) is a Filipino former professional basketball player. He last played in the Philippine Basketball Association for the Powerade Tigers. He was drafted by Sta. Lucia in 2000 as the first overall.

== Player Profile ==
Paolo Mendoza is a certified scoring machine in his high school (UPIS) and collegiate (UP) days where he was scoring above 40 points. In an instance, he holds the UAAP junior record of most points in a single game at 69 when he led University of the Philippines Integrated School to victory over University of the East in 1994. In fact, Mendoza's 48 points – the highest output made by collegiate player – in the 1997 UAAP season stays unbreakable until now.

He is one of the factors that allowed the Realtors to capture the 2001 Governor's Cup championship, the first-ever PBA title of the team. Mendoza, along with Marlou Aquino and Dennis Espino were the last and remaining members of that 2001 champion team before the Sta. Lucia Realtors finally disbanded in 2010.

== PBA career statistics ==
Legend
| GP | Games played | MPG | Minutes per game |
| FG% | Field-goal percentage | 3P% | 3-point field-goal percentage | FT% | Free-throw percentage |
| RPG | Rebounds per game | APG | Assists per game | SPG | Steals per game |
| BPG | Blocks per game | PPG | Points per game | **Bold** | Career high |

=== Season-by-season averages ===
| Year | Team | GP | MPG | FG% | 3P% | FT% | RPG | APG | SPG | BPG | PPG |
|---|---|---|---|---|---|---|---|---|---|---|---|
| 2000 | Sta. Lucia | 40 | 23.9 | .387 | .287 | .817 | 2.4 | 2.1 | .4 | **.1** | 8.0 |
| 2001 | Sta. Lucia | 49 | 26.2 | .379 | .301 | .830 | 2.2 | 2.9 | .3 | **.1** | 9.8 |
| 2002 | Sta. Lucia | 33 | 27.0 | **.399** | .352 | **.893** | 2.6 | 2.6 | .5 | **.1** | **11.0** |
| 2003 | Sta. Lucia | 47 | **29.8** | .329 | .312 | .825 | **2.8** | 2.6 | **.6** | .0 | 8.1 |
| 2004–05 | Sta. Lucia | **52** | 28.6 | .328 | **.361** | .590 | 2.2 | 2.5 | .4 | **.1** | 8.1 |
| 2005–06 | Sta. Lucia | 36 | 26.9 | .344 | .343 | .622 | 2.6 | **3.3** | .4 | **.1** | 9.1 |
| 2006–07 | Sta. Lucia | 46 | 24.0 | .358 | .354 | .650 | 2.3 | 2.3 | .4 | .0 | 8.2 |
| 2007–08 | Sta. Lucia | 50 | 14.9 | .373 | .340 | .792 | 1.1 | 1.4 | .3 | **.1** | 5.5 |
| 2008–09 | Sta. Lucia | 40 | 13.9 | .325 | .311 | .800 | 1.1 | 1.4 | .4 | **.1** | 4.5 |
| 2009–10 | Sta. Lucia | 26 | 15.5 | .303 | .292 | .750 | 1.4 | 1.4 | .2 | .0 | 3.5 |
| 2009–10 | Coca-Cola | 26 | 15.5 | .303 | .292 | .750 | 1.4 | 1.4 | .2 | .0 | 3.5 |
| 2010–11 | Powerade | 14 | 14.1 | .258 | .300 | — | 1.6 | .9 | .1 | .0 | 1.6 |
| Career | | 433 | 23.1 | .355 | .332 | .775 | 2.0 | 2.2 | .4 | .1 | 7.5 |
