= 2000 Tanduay Rhum Masters season =

- Head coach: Alfrancis Chua
- Owner: Lucio "Bong" Tan Jr.

All-Filipino Cup results
- Record: 15–5 (75%)
- Place: 1st seed
- Playoff finish: Semis (lost to Purefoods)

Commissioner's Cup results
- Record: 7–8 (46.7%)
- Place: 3rd seed
- Playoff finish: Semis (lost to Sta. Lucia)

Governor's Cup results
- Record: 6–5 (54.5%)
- Place: 3rd seed
- Playoff finish: QF (lost to SMB)

Tanduay Rhum Masters seasons

The 2000 Tanduay Rhum Masters season was the 2nd season of the franchise (under a new owner) in the Philippine Basketball Association (PBA).

== Transactions ==
Players Added

Via Draft Pick

- Allan Yu

Via Free Agency

- Rudy Hatfield (From the MBA)
- Dondon Hontiveros (From the MBA)

Via Trade

- Jeffrey Cariaso (From Mobiline Phone Pals; three-team trade)
- Zaldy Realubit (From Pop Cola during the Governor's Cup for two second round picks)
Players Lost

Via Trade

- Mark Telan (To Shell Velocity)

== Occurrences ==
Tanduay went on to sweep the Purefoods Tender Juicy Hotdogs, 3-0, in their best-of-five semifinal series of the All-Filipino Cup, but the Rhum Masters saw their victories in Games two and three forfeited when they let Fil-Sham Sonny Alvarado play, despite repeated warnings by the PBA because of Alvarado's fake citizenship papers and the ordered deportation by the Bureau of Immigration. The fiasco went to court after Tanduay secured a restraining order from the Makati court, postponing two playing dates. The Rhum Masters finally withdrew their legal challenge and accepted the penalties from the Commissioner's Office assessed on the ballclub. The Rhum Masters are now down 1-2 against Purefoods in their semifinal series and lost their chance for a finals berth following a 71-72 overtime loss to the Hotdogs in Game four.

== Roster ==
Tanduay Rhum Masters roster
Players

Pos.	#	POB	Name	Height	Weight	DOB (YYYY–MM–DD)	From
G	1	(Philippines)	Jason Webb	6 ft 2 in (1.88 m)			De La Salle
F	6	(Philippines)	Allan Yu	6 ft 2 in (1.88 m)			MLQU
G	7	(Philippines)	Dondon Hontiveros	6 ft 2 in (1.88 m)			Cebu
G	9	(Philippines)	Jomer Rubi	5 ft 7 in (1.70 m)			UPHSD
F	11	(Philippines)	Bobby Jose	6 ft 4 in (1.93 m)			UST
F/C	15	(Puerto Rico)	Sonny Alvarado	6 ft 7 in (2.01 m)			Texas
G	16	(Philippines)	Derrick Bughao	5 ft 8 in (1.73 m)			Visayas
F	20	(Philippines)	Jorge Gallent	6 ft 2 in (1.88 m)			Far Eastern
G/F	22	(Philippines)	Jayvee Gayoso	6 ft 2 in (1.88 m)			Ateneo
G	25	(Philippines)	Pido Jarencio	5 ft 10 in (1.78 m)			UST
G	28	(United States)	Jeffrey Cariaso	6 ft 2 in (1.88 m)			Sonoma State
F/C	30	(United States)	Eric Menk	6 ft 6 in (1.98 m)			Lake Superior State
C	33	(Philippines)	Chris Cantonjos	6 ft 6 in (1.98 m)			UST
F	34	(United States)	Rudy Hatfield	6 ft 3 in (1.91 m)			UM–Dearborn
C	35	(Philippines)	Zaldy Realubit (A)	6 ft 6 in (1.98 m)			USJ–R
F	24	(United States)	Joe Ira Clark (C)	6 ft 6 in (1.98 m)			Texas
G/F	3	(United States)	Maurice Bell (G)	6 ft 4 in (1.93 m)			Louisiana–Monroe

Coaches
Head coach
- (Philippines) Alfrancis Chua
Assistant(s)
- (Philippines) Angelito Esguerra
- (Philippines) Lawrence Chongson

Legend
- (DP) Unsigned draft pick
- (FA) Free agent
- (S) Suspended
- (C) Commissioner's Cup import
- (G) Governor's Cup import
- (A) Acquired from Pop Cola
- Injured

== Eliminations (Won games) ==
DATE	OPPONENT	SCORE	VENUE (Location)
February 23	Mobiline	80-65	Philsports Arena
February 26	Pop Cola	100-72	Dumaguete City
March 1	Shell	86-79	Philsports Arena
March 5	Alaska	82-65	Araneta Coliseum
March 10	Red Bull	106-88	Philsports Arena
March 15	Sta.Lucia	104-76	Philsports Arena
March 26	Brgy.Ginebra	89-72	Araneta Coliseum
March 31	Sta.Lucia	83-70	Philsports Arena
April 15	Brgy.Ginebra	110-79	San Fernando, Pampanga
April 19	San Miguel	84-62	Araneta Coliseum
April 28	Shell	88-81	Philsports Arena
May 3	Purefoods	87-75	Philsports Arena
June 28	Alaska	84-74	Philsports Arena
July 2	San Miguel	64-59	Araneta Coliseum
July 15	Brgy.Ginebra	96-85	Laoag City
July 21	Purefoods	100-82	Philsports Arena
July 23	Shell	85-69	Araneta Coliseum
October 13	Sta.Lucia	87-80	Philsports Arena
October 15	Shell	100-93	Araneta Coliseum
October 22	Brgy.Ginebra	103-96	Araneta Coliseum
October 27	Pop Cola	93-90	Araneta Coliseum
November 15	San Miguel	84-82	Araneta Coliseum
November 19	Purefoods	97-87	Araneta Coliseum

All-Filipino Cup Commissioner's Cup Governor's Cup
