= Dino Aldeguer =

Filipino former basketball player

Personal information
- Born: November 26, 1975 (age 50)
- Listed height: 5 ft 10 in (1.78 m)

Career information
- College: De La Salle
- PBA draft: 2000: 1st round, 3rd overall pick
- Drafted by: Purefoods Tender Juicy Hotdogs
- Position: Point guard
- Number: 11

Career history
- 2000: Alaska Milkmen
- 2001–2002: Negros Slashers

Career highlights
- PBA champion (2000 All-Filipino); 2× UAAP champion (1998, 1999); MBA champion (2002)

Fernando "Dino" Aldeguer III (born November 28, 1975) is a Filipino former basketball player.

== Playing career ==
=== La Salle ===
Aldeguer played for De La Salle Green Archers under Jong Uichico, then under Franz Pumaren (1998 to 1999). He won a championship in 1998 and 1999 with Ren-ren Ritualo, Mon Jose, and future San Juan Mayor Francis Zamora.

His notable performance when he shot a three pointer that send the 1999 finals game 3 into overtime.

=== Professional ===
Aldeguer played for Alaska Aces under Tim Cone. He also played for Negros Slashers in MBA and won a championship.

== Personal life ==
Aldeguer stopped playing professionally to work in a construction company. He plays squash as a pastime. Aldeguer is the younger brother of Philippine trade secretary Cristina Aldeguer-Roque and the brother-in-law of former Coca-Cola Tigers coach and Parañaque councilor Binky Favis. His son, Andres Aldeguer, is a footballer who plays for the Philippines national under-23 team.
