= Mark Telan =

Filipino basketball player

Personal information
- Born: January 12, 1976 (age 50) Santa Maria, Isabela, Philippines
- Listed height: 6 ft 7 in (2.01 m)
- Listed weight: 210 lb (95 kg)

Career information
- High school: Mapúa (Manila)
- College: De La Salle
- PBA draft: 1999: Direct hire
- Drafted by: Tanduay Rhum Masters
- Playing career: 1999–2011
- Position: Center / power forward

Career history
- 1999: Tanduay Rhum Masters
- 2000–2001: Shell Turbo Chargers
- 2002–2006: Talk 'N Text Phone Pals
- 2006–2007: Air21 Express
- 2007–2009: Coca-Cola Tigers
- 2009–2010: Rain or Shine Elasto Painters
- 2010–2011: Talk 'N Text Tropang Texters

Career highlights
- 2x PBA champion (2003 All-Filipino Cup, 2010-11 Philippine Cup); PBA All-Star (2000); PBA Most Improved Player (2000); PBA Mythical Second Team (2004-05); 2x UAAP Most Valuable Player (1996, 1997); UAAP Rookie of the Year (1993)

Mark Clemence Telan (born January 12, 1976) is a Filipino former professional basketball player. He last played for the Talk 'N Text Tropang Texters in the Philippine Basketball Association (PBA). A former De La Salle Green Archer, he was 2-time UAAP basketball Most Valuable Player. Telan entered the professional league in 1999 as a direct hire by the Tanduay Rhum Masters. When his team retooled the roster for the 2000 season, he was acquired by the Shell Turbo Chargers, where he was named Most Improved Player in 2000. In 2002, he was then picked by the Talk 'N Text Phone Pals. After his tenure with Talk 'N Text, he was traded to the Air21 Express and then to the Coca-Cola Tigers. In 2009, Telan signed up with the Rain or Shine Elasto Painters as the offer was not matched by his team Coca-Cola. In 2010, he returns to Talk 'N Text.

He is known to be a solid low post threat and a good outside shooter. His defense is also commendable. His style of play has often drawn comparisons with that of his favorite NBA player Toni Kukoč.

== PBA career statistics ==
Legend
GP	Games played	MPG	Minutes per game
FG%	Field-goal percentage	3P%	3-point field-goal percentage	FT%	Free-throw percentage
RPG	Rebounds per game	APG	Assists per game	SPG	Steals per game
BPG	Blocks per game	PPG	Points per game	**Bold**	Career high

=== Season-by-season averages ===
Year	Team	GP	MPG	FG%	3P%	FT%	RPG	APG	SPG	BPG	PPG
1999	Tanduay	41	10.5	**.551**	.250	.641	2.3	.2	.2	.5	3.8
2000	Shell	33	**31.1**	.423	**.333**	.705	6.9	1.2	**.5**	1.2	**12.9**
2001	Shell	51	25.3	.453	.258	.594	5.7	1.0	.2	**1.4**	7.6
2002	Talk 'N Text	42	20.6	.471	.267	**.759**	4.3	.6	.2	.4	8.0
2003	Talk 'N Text	55	15.2	.367	.216	.625	3.0	.7	.3	.2	5.2
2004–05	Talk 'N Text	**70**	24.7	.482	.216	.675	6.4	.9	**.5**	.8	10.8
2005–06	Talk 'N Text	22	21.7	.450	.167	.567	5.4	.6	.2	.7	9.4
2005–06	Air21	20	26.5	.456	.167	.424	**9.5**	**1.4**	**.5**	.7	12.0
2006–07	Air21	43	29.6	.456	.205	.644	8.4	1.0	.4	.9	12.8
2007–08	Coca-Cola	41	21.2	.498	.231	.534	7.3	1.3	.1	.4	8.5
2008–09	Coca-Cola	35	28.3	.500	.214	.624	6.9	**1.4**	.3	.5	9.2
2009–10	Rain or Shine	40	13.4	.463	**.333**	.479	3.6	.4	.3	.3	3.7
2010–11	Talk 'N Text	3	4.3	.500	—	—	1.3	.3	.0	.0	.7
Career		496	21.9	.459	.240	.617	5.6	.9	.3	.7	8.4
