= Panay Technological College =

Private college in Aklan, Philippines

- Type: Private College
- Established: 1993
- Location: Kalibo, Aklan, Philippines; 11°35′48.54″N 122°45′18.55″E
- Location in the Visayas Location in the Philippines

Panay Technological College is a higher institution in Kalibo, Aklan.
