= Alex Crisano =

Filipino-American basketball player (born 1976)

Personal information
- Born: February 26, 1976 (age 50) Brooklyn, New York
- Listed height: 6 ft 7 in (2.01 m)
- Listed weight: 240 lb (109 kg)

Career information
- College: Brooklyn College
- PBA draft: 2000: Direct Hire
- Drafted by: Barangay Ginebra Kings
- Playing career: 1999–2013
- Position: Center / power forward
- Number: 43, 5

Career history
- 1999: Nueva Ecija Patriots
- 2000–2001: Barangay Ginebra Kings
- 2002: Talk 'N Text Phone Pals
- 2003 2007–2009: Barangay Ginebra Kings
- 2009: Barako Bull Energy Boosters
- 2010–2011: Philippine Patriots
- 2011–2012: Powerade Tigers
- 2012–2013: GlobalPort Batang Pier

Alex Vincent Crisano (born February 26, 1976) is a Filipino-American former professional basketball player.

== First Years ==
Crisano was undrafted in 2000 but he was signed and directly hired by the Barangay Ginebra Kings. However, his stay with the Gin Kings was cut at the end of the 2004 PBA Fiesta Conference. He also played for the Talk 'N Text Tropang Texters that were known as the Phone Pals.

== Return to Barangay Ginebra ==
Before the start of the 2008 PBA Fiesta Conference, the management of Ginebra announced that Crisano will return for the team. From there, his game as an energy player and a crowd favorite was seen by the fans. He helped the team beat the Air21 Express in the finals 4–3.

== Barako Bull ==
After two conferences with Ginebra, he was acquired by the Barako Bull Energy Boosters during the 2009 PBA Fiesta Conference where he became the leader of the team. At the 2009–10 Philippine Cup, he had a career season averaging 8.9 points 6.2 rebounds and 32 percent from the 3-point line. However, the team did not make the playoffs finishing at the bottom of the standings with a 3–15 record. Also, due to financial problems of the franchise, he was not able to stay with the team for the following conference.

== Philippine Patriots ==
He was chosen as one of the players for the Philippine Patriots in the Asean Basketball League alongside Allan Salangsang and Egay Billones to defend their title. However, they lost to the Chang Thailand Slammers in the finals.

== Powerade Tigers ==
After his stint with the Patriots, he was acquired by the Powerade Tigers to boost up their frontline.

== Globalport Batang Pier ==
He played in 1 Regular Season of Globalport Batang Pier in 2012–2013

== PBA career statistics ==
Legend
GP	Games played	MPG	Minutes per game
FG%	Field-goal percentage	3P%	3-point field-goal percentage	FT%	Free-throw percentage
RPG	Rebounds per game	APG	Assists per game	SPG	Steals per game
BPG	Blocks per game	PPG	Points per game	**Bold**	Career high

=== Season-by-season averages ===
Year	Team	GP	MPG	FG%	3P%	FT%	RPG	APG	SPG	BPG	PPG
2000	Barangay Ginebra	27	22.5	.494	.125	.800	5.4	.5	.2	.3	4.3
2001	Barangay Ginebra	**36**	**23.4**	.533	.111	.571	6.0	.3	**.3**	**.9**	5.5
2002	Talk 'N Text	34	9.9	.479	**.333**	.615	2.7	.2	**.3**	.4	2.5
2003	Barangay Ginebra	25	14.1	**.610**	.000	.652	3.8	.2	.0	.5	4.4
2007–08	Barangay Ginebra	25	11.1	.469	.000	.517	3.8	.4	.1	.2	3.0
2008–09	Barangay Ginebra	33	12.5	.417	.217	.582	3.6	.4	.2	.2	4.5
2008–09	Barako Bull	33	12.5	.417	.217	.582	3.6	.4	.2	.2	4.5
2009–10	Barako Energy Coffee	17	22.7	.440	.317	.690	**6.2**	**.8**	**.3**	.5	**8.9**
2011–12	Powerade	30	6.9	.350	.286	**1.000**	1.8	.3	.1	.2	1.8
2012–13	GlobalPort	5	3.6	.000	.000	—	.8	**.8**	.0	.2	.0
Career		232	14.9	.475	.236	.638	4.0	.4	.2	.4	4.0
