= 2000 San Miguel Beermen season =

- Head coach: Jong Uichico
- Owner: San Miguel Corporation

All-Filipino Cup results
- Record: 12–8 (60%)
- Place: 2nd seed
- Playoff finish: Semis (lost to Alaska)

Commissioner's Cup results
- Record: 15–3 (83.3%)
- Place: 1st seed
- Playoff finish: Champions

Governors Cup results
- Record: 13–7 (65%)
- Place: 6th seed
- Playoff finish: Champions

San Miguel Beermen seasons

The 2000 San Miguel Beermen season was the 26th season of the franchise in the Philippine Basketball Association (PBA).

== Championships ==
The San Miguel Beermen won their 14th PBA title in the Commissioner's Cup by defeating first-time finalist Sta.Lucia Realtors, four games to one. The Beermen overtakes the famed Crispa Redmanizers as the league's winningest ballclub.

In the Governor's Cup, the San Miguel Beermen claim their 15th crown at the expense of Purefoods Tender Juicy Hotdogs, four games to one, as the Beermen retains the two championships they won last year.

== Awards ==
- In his third year in the league, Danny Ildefonso, who won Rookie of the Year Honors in 1998, bag the coveted Most Valuable Player (MVP) trophy.
- Two other Beermen, sophomore Danny Seigle and guard Olsen Racela made it to the Mythical five selection.

== Roster ==
2000 San Miguel Beermen roster
Players

Pos.	#	POB	Name	Height	Weight	DOB (YYYY–MM–DD)	From
G	1	(Philippines)	Emmanuel Victoria	5 ft 10 in (1.78 m)			San Beda
C	3	(United States)	Nic Belasco	6 ft 6 in (1.98 m)			Notre Dame (OH)
C	5	(Philippines)	Ronilo Padilla	6 ft 5 in (1.96 m)			Cebu
F	7	(Philippines)	Michael Mustre	6 ft 1 in (1.85 m)			Letran
F/C	10	(Philippines)	Danny Ildefonso	6 ft 6 in (1.98 m)			National-U
F	15	(Philippines)	Dwight Lago	6 ft 3 in (1.91 m)			De La Salle
G	17	(Philippines)	Olsen Racela	5 ft 10 in (1.78 m)			Ateneo
F	18	(Philippines)	Arturo Dela Cruz	6 ft 3 in (1.91 m)			San Sebastian
F	25	(Philippines)	Freddie Abuda	6 ft 4 in (1.93 m)			Cebu
F	32	(United States)	Robert Duat	6 ft 4 in (1.93 m)			Menlo
F	42	(United States)	Danny Seigle	6 ft 6 in (1.98 m)			Wagner
F/C	44	(Philippines)	June Carmona	6 ft 6 in (1.98 m)			UPHSD
F	21	(United States)	Stephen Howard (C)	6 ft 8 in (2.03 m)			DePaul
G	6	(United States)	Lamont Strothers (G)	6 ft 2 in (1.88 m)			Christopher Newport

Coaches
Head coach
- (Philippines) Jong Uichico
Assistant(s)
- (Philippines) Siot Tanquingcen

Legend
- (DP) Unsigned draft pick
- (FA) Free agent
- (S) Suspended
- (C) Commissioner's Cup import
- (G) Governor's Cup import
- Injured

== Eliminations (won games) ==
DATE	OPPONENT	SCORE	VENUE (Location)
March 1	Alaska	81-80	Philsports Arena
March 4	Mobiline	77-62	Iloilo City
March 8	Brgy.Ginebra	74-58	Araneta Coliseum
March 12	Shell	86-78	Araneta Coliseum
March 19	Tanduay	76-67	Araneta Coliseum
March 24	Pop Cola	87-84	Philsports Arena
March 29	Red Bull	71-68	Philsports Arena
April 1	Purefoods	73-65	Cagayan de Oro
April 14	Sta.Lucia	86-52	Philsports Arena
April 26	Alaska	89-81	Philsports Arena
June 23	Brgy.Ginebra	93-81	Philsports Arena
June 28	Sunkist	82-72	Philsports Arena
July 8	Mobiline	87-85	Ynares Center
July 12	Alaska	88-72	Araneta Coliseum
July 14	Shell	85-68	Philsports Arena
July 19	Purefoods	85-63	Philsports Arena
July 30	Red Bull	87-83	Araneta Coliseum
October 4	Brgy.Ginebra	94-72	Philsports Arena
October 25	Shell	86-50	Philsports Arena
October 29	Pop Cola	95-84	Araneta Coliseum
November 17	Sta.Lucia	80-79	Ynares Center

All-Filipino Cup Commissioner's Cup Governor's Cup
