= 2000 Purefoods Tender Juicy Hotdogs season =

- Head coach: Derrick Pumaren
- General manager: Rene Pardo
- Owner: Purefoods Corporation

All-Filipino Cup results
- Record: 13–12 (52%)
- Place: 4th seed
- Playoff finish: Runner-up

Commissioner's Cup results
- Record: 4–6 (40%)
- Place: 5th seed
- Playoff finish: QF (lost to Alaska)

Governors Cup results
- Record: 10–10 (50%)
- Place: 4th seed
- Playoff finish: Runner-up

Purefoods Tender Juicy Hotdogs seasons

The 2000 Purefoods Tender Juicy Hotdogs season was the 13th season of the franchise in the Philippine Basketball Association (PBA). This will be the team's final season under Ayala Corporation.

== Transactions ==
Players Added

Via Free Agency

- Braulio Lim (From Alaska Aces)

Via Trade

- Noy Castillo (From Shell Velocity in exchange for future first round pick)
Players Lost

Via Expansion Draft

- Edmund Reyes (Taken by Red Bull)

Via Free Agency

- Genesis Sasuman

== Finals stint ==
Purefoods return to the PBA finals after two years of non-title playoff. In the All-Filipino Cup, the Tender Juicy Hotdogs got the benefit of playing in the championship when the league forfeited Tanduay Rhum's two wins over them during the Best-of-five semifinal series where Fil-Sham Sonny Alvarado was fielded in. With the series stands at 2-1 in their favor, Purefoods went on to win game four, 72–71 in overtime, on the heroics of guard Boyet Fernandez to reach the All-Filipino finals against the Alaska Milkmen. After winning game one of the finals series, the Tender Juicy Hotdogs lost the next four games and settled for runner-up honors.

Behind best import Derrick Brown, the Purefoods Tender Juicy Hotdogs were on their second trip to the finals in the Governors Cup. They played the defending champions San Miguel Beermen. The Hotdogs fell behind by losing the first three games of the best-of-seven title series and lost anew in five games for another runner-up finish in the season.

== Roster ==
2000 Purefoods Tender Juicy Hotdogs roster
Players

Pos.	#	POB	Name	Height	Weight	DOB (YYYY–MM–DD)	From
F	2	(Philippines)	Richard Yee	6 ft 4 in (1.93 m)			UST
F	3	(Philippines)	Braulio Lim	6 ft 3 in (1.91 m)			UE
G	4	(Philippines)	Jessie Cabanayan	5 ft 8 in (1.73 m)			Baguio
G	6	(Philippines)	Boyet Fernandez	5 ft 8 in (1.73 m)			San Agustin
F	7	(Philippines)	Rey Evangelista	6 ft 3 in (1.91 m)			UST
G	10	(Philippines)	Dindo Pumaren	5 ft 9 in (1.75 m)			De La Salle
C	11	(Philippines)	Edward Joseph Feihl	7 ft 1 in (2.16 m)			Adamson
F	16	(Philippines)	Alvin Patrimonio	6 ft 3 in (1.91 m)			Mapúa
G	24	(Philippines)	Rommel Daep	6 ft 2 in (1.88 m)			San Sebastian
G	40	(United States)	Noy Castillo	6 ft 0 in (1.83 m)			The Citadel
C	52	(United States)	Andy Seigle	6 ft 9 in (2.06 m)			New Orleans
F	12	(Niger)	Julius Nwosu (C)	6 ft 7 in (2.01 m)			Liberty
F	9	(United States)	Joe Stephens (C)	6 ft 7 in (2.01 m)			Colorado
G/F	32	(United States)	Derrick Brown (G)	6 ft 3 in (1.91 m)			Providence

Coaches
Head coach
- (Philippines) Derrick Pumaren
Assistant(s)
- (Philippines) Gee Abanilla
- (Philippines) Agustin Tiongco

Legend
- (DP) Unsigned draft pick
- (FA) Free agent
- (S) Suspended
- (C) Commissioner's Cup import
- (G) Governor's Cup import
- Injured

== Eliminations (Won games) ==
=== Games won ===
DATE	OPPONENT	SCORE	VENUE (Location)
February 25	San Miguel	98-75	Philsports Arena
March 3	Red Bull	76-71	Philsports Arena
March 11	Brgy.Ginebra	92-80	Zamboanga City
March 26	Mobiline	80-75	Araneta Coliseum
April 5	Sta.Lucia	84-65	Philsports Arena
April 16	Shell	76-69	Araneta Coliseum
April 23	Sta.Lucia	68-62	Araneta Coliseum
April 28	Brgy.Ginebra	65-59	Philsports Arena
June 30	Brgy.Ginebra	97-76	Ynares Center
July 9	Sta.Lucia	81-77	Araneta Coliseum
July 29	Alaska	79-62	Ormoc City
August 2	Mobiline	81-78	Philsports Arena
September 30	Alaska	91-88	Araneta Coliseum
October 7	Shell	105-97	San Jose, Antique
October 27	Sta.Lucia	87-82	Araneta Coliseum
November 10	San Miguel	92-86	Philsports Arena
November 15	Red Bull	96-94	Araneta Coliseum

All-Filipino Cup Commissioner's Cup Governor's Cup
