= Salazar Colleges of Science and Institute of Technology =

Private college in Cebu City, Philippines

- Former names: SALCON Institute of Technology (1983–1986); Salazar Institute of Technology (1986–2008)
- Type: Private
- Established: 1983
- Chairman: Doroteo M. Salazar
- President: Doroteo M. Salazar
- Vice-president: Zenaida F. Salazar; Comptroller; Alden F. Salazar; Foreign Linkage; Beth Salazar-Villarin; Academics; Cherrie Salazar-Hererra; Medical and Related Science; Doris Salazar Sawyer; Planning, Program and Legal Affair; Edwin F. Salazar; EVP; Frederick F. Salazar; Personnel, External and Legal Affairs
- Dean: Serapion Sotto; Education; Edgar Salgado; Maritime Studies; Victoria Jimenez; Nursing; Heronia Denampo-Mata; Criminology
- Students: 1,844 (Main campus)
- Location: Brgy. Labangon, Cebu City, Cebu, Philippines; 10°17′46″N 123°53′01″E
- Campus: 2 (Cebu Main, Madridejos Campus)
- Founder: Doroteo M. Salazar
- Nickname: Skyblazers
- Website: www.scsit.edu.ph
- Location in the Visayas Location in the Philippines

Salazar Colleges of Science and Institute of Technology (SCSIT) is educational institution of basic education and higher learning in Cebu City, Philippines.

== Programs Offering ==
College of Business and Hospitality Management

- BS in Business Administration – Major in Marketing
- BS in Hotel and Restaurant Management
- Associate in Hotel and Restaurant Management

College of Computer Studies

- BS in Information Technology
- Associate in Computer Technology

College of Education

- BS in Elementary Education
- BS in Secondary Education

College of Engineering

- BS in Civil Engineering
- BS in Computer Engineering
- BS in Electrical Engineering
- BS in Electronics Communication Engineering

College of Criminology

- BS in Criminology

College of Nursing

- Associate in Vocational Nursing
- Associate in Practical Nursing
- Licensed Practical Nursing
- Nursing Aide
- Care giving
- Midwifery

College of Maritime

- BS in Marine Transportation
- BS in Marine Engineering
- Associate in Marine Engineering
- Basic Seaman Course
