= 2000 PBA season =

26th PBA season

- Duration: February 20 – December 20, 2000
- Teams: 10
- TV partner: Viva TV (IBC)

2000 PBA Draft
- Top draft pick: Paolo Mendoza
- Picked by: Sta. Lucia Realtors
- Season MVP: Danny Ildefonso (San Miguel Beermen)
- All-Filipino Cup champions: Alaska Milkmen
- All-Filipino Cup runners-up: Purefoods Tender Juicy Hotdogs
- Commissioner's Cup champions: San Miguel Beermen
- Commissioner's Cup runners-up: Sta. Lucia Realtors
- Governors Cup champions: San Miguel Beermen
- Governors Cup runners-up: Purefoods Tender Juicy Hotdogs

Seasons
- ← 1999 2001 →

The 2000 PBA season was the 26th season of the Philippine Basketball Association (PBA).

== Board of governors ==
=== Executive committee ===
- Emilio Bernardino Jr. (Commissioner)
- Wilfred Steven Uytengsu (chairman, representing Alaska Milkmen)
- Ignatius Yenko (Vice-chairman, representing Mobiline Phone Pals)
- Alberto Villa-Abrille Jr. (Treasurer, representing San Miguel Beermen)

=== Teams ===
Team	Company	Governor	Alternate Governor
Alaska Milkmen	Alaska Milk Corporation	Wilfred Steven Uytengsu	Joaquin Trillo
Barangay Ginebra Kings	La Tondeña Distillers, Inc.	Casiano Cabalan Jr.	Ira Daniel Maniquis
Batang Red Bull Energizers	Photokina Marketing Corporation	George Chua	George Balagtas
Mobiline Phone Pals	Philippine Long Distance Telephone Company	Ignatius Yenko	Deborah Anne Tan
Pop Cola 800s	Republic Flour Mills Corporation	Elmer Yanga	Philip Prieto
Purefoods Tender Juicy Hotdogs	Purefoods Corporation	Francisco Alejo III	
Sta. Lucia Realtors	Sta. Lucia Realty and Development Corporation	Manuel Encarnado	
San Miguel Beermen	San Miguel Brewery, Inc.	Alberto Villa-Abrille Jr.	
Shell Turbo Chargers	Pilipinas Shell Petroleum Corporation	Reynaldo Gamboa	
Tanduay Rhum Masters	Basic Holdings Corporation	Lucio Tan Jr.	David De Joya

== Notable occurrences ==
- PBA's TV partner, Vintage Television was absorbed by Viva Entertainment.
- Batang Red Bull Energizers entered the league as an expansion team.
- Songwriter and composer Jim Paredes was commissioned by the league to compose the league's theme song, in celebration of its 25th anniversary. The song, entitled "Todo Bigay" was first performed by Regine Velasquez during the league's opening ceremonies.
- The league celebrated their silver anniversary on April 9, 2000, with the awarding of the PBA's 25 greatest players.
- The league forfeited Batang Red Bull's wins when 18-year-old Kerby Raymundo was found to have deficient academic credentials. He would later return to the team in 2001.
- It was the year when a crackdown of alleged fake Fil-foreign cagers led to deportations of Asi Taulava and Sonny Alvarado. Eric Menk, Danny Seigle and Chris Jackson were among those suspended by the PBA.
- The Bureau of Immigration and Deportation (BID) revoked the Filipino citizenship of Tanduay's Sonny Alvarado as it uncovered that the player used fraudulent papers; consequently, the BID ordered Alvarado's deportation.
- Alvarado's deportation affected the season's All-Filipino Cup semifinal round after PBA commissioner Jun Bernardino forfeited two of Tanduay's semifinal wins (Games 2 and 3) against Purefoods, since Alvarado played in those games (he didn't play in the first game). With the forfeitures, the series would have resumed on Game 4 with Purefoods leading the series 2–1; however, Tanduay secured a temporary restraining order (TRO) that prevented the league from staging Game 4 of their series. This has been the first time a PBA game has been suspended via a court order.

== Opening ceremonies ==
The muses for the participating teams are as follows:

Team	Muse
Alaska Milkmen	Children of Alaska players
Batang Red Bull Energizers	Lindsay Custodio and Assunta De Rossi
Barangay Ginebra Kings	Ana Roces
Pop Cola 800s	Cris Villonco
Mobiline Phone Pals	Mary Jean Maycon
Purefoods Tender Juicy Hotdogs	Antoinette Taus
San Miguel Beermen	Bianca Zobel
Shell Velocity	Miriam Quiambao
Sta. Lucia Realtors	Binibining Pilipinas 2000 candidates
Tanduay Rhum Masters	Bernadette Allyson

== 2000 PBA All-Filipino Cup ==
=== Elimination round ===
Pos	Team	W	L	PCT	GB	Qualification
1	Tanduay Rhum Masters	12	2	.857	—	Twice-to-beat in the quarterfinals
2	San Miguel Beermen	10	4	.714 (Note: Head-to-head differential: San Miguel +9, Alaska −9)	2	Twice-to-beat in the quarterfinals
3	Alaska Milkmen	10	4	.714	2	Twice-to-beat in the quarterfinals
4	Purefoods TJ Hotdogs	8	6	.571	4	Twice-to-beat in the quarterfinals
5	Sta. Lucia Realtors	6	8	.429 (Note: Head-to-head differential: Sta. Lucia +10, Pop Cola −10)	6	Twice-to-win in the quarterfinals
6	Pop Cola 800s	6	8	.429	6	Twice-to-win in the quarterfinals
7	Mobiline Phone Pals	5	9	.357 (Note: Head-to-head differential: Mobiline +24, Barangay Ginebra +3, Shell −27; eighth-seed playoff: Barangay Ginebra 71–68 Shell)	7	Twice-to-win in the quarterfinals
8	Barangay Ginebra Kings	5	9	.357	7	Twice-to-win in the quarterfinals
9	Shell Velocity	5	9	.357	7	
10	Batang Red Bull Energizers (Note: Red Bull had to forfeit two of their wins (both against Sta. Lucia) when they fielded an ineligible player.)	3	11	.214	9	

Source: PBA.ph

=== Playoffs ===
Quarterfinals (Top 4 twice-to-beat)
1	Tanduay	101
8	Brgy. Ginebra	78
4	Purefoods	68	89
5	Sta. Lucia	93	79
2	San Miguel	82
7	Mobiline	61
3	Alaska	81
6	Pop Cola	67

Semifinals (Best-of-5)
1	Tanduay	1
4	Purefoods	3
2	San Miguel	1
3	Alaska	3

Finals (Best-of-7)
4	Purefoods	1
3	Alaska	4
Third-place playoff
1	Tanduay	103
2	San Miguel	92

==== Quarterfinals ====
Team 1	Series	Team 2	Game 1	Game 2
(1) Tanduay Rhum Masters*	1–0	(8) Barangay Ginebra Kings	101–78	—
(2) San Miguel Beermen*	1–0	(7) Mobiline Phone Pals	82–61	—
(3) Alaska Milkmen*	1–0	(6) Pop Cola 800s	81–67	—
(4) Purefoods TJ Hotdogs*	1–1	(5) Sta. Lucia Realtors	68–93	89–79

*Team has twice-to-beat advantage. Team 1 only has to win once, while Team 2 has to win twice.

==== Semifinals ====
Team 1	Series	Team 2	Game 1	Game 2	Game 3	Game 4	Game 5
(1) Tanduay Rhum Masters	1–3	(4) Purefoods TJ Hotdogs	91–79	~~85–75~~ (Note: Tanduay originally won Games 2 and 3, and the series 3–0, but the results of these games were reversed after Tanduay player Sonny Alvarado played on these games and was later ruled to be ineligible. The series resumed with Purefoods leading the series 2–1.)	~~93–70~~	71–72 (OT)	—
(2) San Miguel Beermen	1–3	(3) Alaska Milkmen	70–77	77–75	78–83	83–120	—

===== Third place playoff =====
Team 1	Score	Team 2
(1) Tanduay Rhum Masters	103–92	(2) San Miguel Beermen

==== Finals ====
Team 1	Series	Team 2	Game 1	Game 2	Game 3	Game 4	Game 5	Game 6	Game 7
(3) Alaska Aces	4–1	(4) Purefoods TJ Hotdogs	59–73	93–76	79–71	88–75	85–84	—	—

== 2000 PBA Commissioner's Cup ==
=== Elimination round ===
Pos	Team	W	L	PCT	GB	Qualification
1	San Miguel Beermen	7	2	.778	—	Twice-to-beat in the quarterfinals
2	Sta. Lucia Realtors	6	3	.667	1	Twice-to-beat in the quarterfinals
3	Tanduay Rhum Masters	5	4	.556 (Note: Head-to-head record: Tanduay 1–0 Alaska)	2	Twice-to-beat in the quarterfinals
4	Alaska Milkmen	5	4	.556	2	Twice-to-beat in the quarterfinals
5	Purefoods TJ Hotdogs	4	5	.444 (Note: Head-to-head differential: Purefoods +22, Mobiline +9, Sunkist −8, Barangay Ginebra −23)	3	Twice-to-win in the quarterfinals
6	Mobiline Phone Pals	4	5	.444	3	Twice-to-win in the quarterfinals
7	Sunkist Orange Juicers	4	5	.444	3	Twice-to-win in the quarterfinals
8	Barangay Ginebra Kings	4	5	.444	3	Twice-to-win in the quarterfinals
9	Batang Red Bull Thunder	3	6	.333 (Note: Head-to-head record: Red Bull 1–0 Shell)	4	
10	Shell Turbo Chargers	3	6	.333	4	

Source: PBA.ph

=== Playoffs ===
Quarterfinals (Top 4 twice-to-beat)
1	San Miguel	90
8	Brgy. Ginebra	89
4	Alaska	85
5	Purefoods	82
2	Sta. Lucia	72
7	Sunkist	69
3	Tanduay	77
6	Mobiline	66

Semifinals (Best-of-5)
1	San Miguel	3
4	Alaska	0
2	Sta. Lucia	3
3	Tanduay	1

Finals (Best-of-7)
1	San Miguel	4
2	Sta. Lucia	1
Third place playoff
4	Alaska	119
3	Tanduay	71

==== Quarterfinals ====
Team 1	Series	Team 2	Game 1	Game 2
(1) San Miguel Beermen*	1–0	(8) Barangay Ginebra Kings	90–89	—
(2) Sta. Lucia Realtors*	1–0	(7) Sunkist Orange Juicers	72–69	—
(3) Tanduay Rhum Masters*	1–0	(6) Mobiline Phone Pals	77–66	—
(4) Alaska Milkmen*	1–0	(5) Purefoods TJ Hotdogs	85–82	—

*Team has twice-to-beat advantage. Team 1 only has to win once, while Team 2 has to win twice.

==== Semifinals ====
Team 1	Series	Team 2	Game 1	Game 2	Game 3	Game 4	Game 5
(1) San Miguel Beermen	3–0	(4) Alaska Milkmen	106–91	94–93	88–76	—	—
(2) Sta. Lucia Realtors	3–1	(3) Tanduay Rhum Masters	79–65	93–85	73–95	80–71	—

==== Third place playoff ====
Team 1	Score	Team 2
(3) Tanduay Rhum Masters	71–119	(4) Alaska Milkmen

==== Finals ====
Team 1	Series	Team 2	Game 1	Game 2	Game 3	Game 4	Game 5	Game 6	Game 7
(1) San Miguel Beermen	4–1	(2) Sta. Lucia Realtors	106–78	72–67	89–85	66–78	79–77	—	—

== 2000 PBA Governors' Cup ==
=== Elimination round ===
Pos	Team	W	L	PCT	GB	Qualification
1	Mobiline Phone Pals	7	2	.778 (Note: Head-to-head record: Mobiline 1–0 Red Bull)	—	Twice-to-beat in the quarterfinals
2	Batang Red Bull Thunder	7	2	.778	—	Twice-to-beat in the quarterfinals
3	Tanduay Rhum Masters	6	3	.667	1	Twice-to-beat in the quarterfinals
4	Purefoods TJ Hotdogs	5	4	.556 (Note: Head-to-head record: Alaska 1–0 Purefoods)	2	Twice-to-beat in the quarterfinals
5	Alaska Aces	5	4	.556	2	Twice-to-win in the quarterfinals
6	San Miguel Beermen	4	5	.444 (Note: Head-to-head differential: San Miguel +23, Sta. Lucia +3, Barangay Ginebra −28)	3	Twice-to-win in the quarterfinals
7	Sta. Lucia Realtors	4	5	.444	3	Twice-to-win in the quarterfinals
8	Barangay Ginebra Kings	4	5	.444	3	Twice-to-win in the quarterfinals
9	Pop Cola Panthers	2	7	.222	5	
10	Shell Turbo Chargers	1	8	.111	6	

Source: PBA.ph

=== Playoffs ===
Quarterfinals (Top 4 twice-to-beat)
1	Mobiline	81	100
8	Brgy. Ginebra	84	86
4	Purefoods	80	88
5	Alaska	91	69
2	Red Bull	91
7	Sta. Lucia	87
3	Tanduay	89	83
6	San Miguel	100	90

Semifinals (Best-of-5)
1	Mobiline	1
4	Purefoods	3
2	Red Bull	1
6	San Miguel	3

Finals (Best-of-7)
4	Purefoods	1
6	San Miguel	4
Third place playoff
1	Mobiline	89
2	Red Bull	98

==== Quarterfinals ====
Team 1	Series	Team 2	Game 1	Game 2
(1) Mobiline Phone Pals*	1–1	(8) Barangay Ginebra Kings	81–84	100–86
(2) Batang Red Bull Thunder*	1–0	(7) Sta. Lucia Realtors	91–87	—
(3) Tanduay Rhum Masters*	0–2	(6) San Miguel Beermen	89–100	83–90
(4) Purefoods TJ Hotdogs*	1–1	(5) Alaska Aces	80–91	88–69

*Team has twice-to-beat advantage. Team 1 only has to win once, while Team 2 has to win twice.

==== Semifinals ====
Team 1	Series	Team 2	Game 1	Game 2	Game 3	Game 4	Game 5
(1) Mobiline Phone Pals	1–3	(4) Purefoods TJ Hotdogs	69–93	102–92	97–110	90–100	—
(2) Batang Red Bull Thunder	1–3	(3) San Miguel Beermen	97–100	68–82	98–84	87–93	—

==== Third place playoff ====
Team 1	Score	Team 2
(1) Mobiline Phone Pals	89–98	(2) Batang Red Bull Thunder

=== Finals ===
Team 1	Series	Team 2	Game 1	Game 2	Game 3	Game 4	Game 5	Game 6	Game 7
(4) Purefoods TJ Hotdogs	1–4	(6) San Miguel Beermen	79–85	76–79	101–105 (2OT)	107–95	88–96	—	—

== ABC-PBA All-Star Game ==
As celebration to the league's twenty-fifth anniversary, the league and the Asian Basketball Confederation (now FIBA Asia) held the ABC-PBA All-Star Game. Controversy ensued when ABC team member Rommel Adducul (who was also playing for the Manila Metrostars of the Metropolitan Basketball Association) had to be late due to his commitments with the Metrostars. Adducul earlier played against the Pasig-Rizal Pirates, a few kilometers away from the ABC-PBA All-Star venue.

August 6

PBA All-Stars 101, ABC All-Stars 81

PhilSports Arena, Pasig

== Awards ==
- Most Valuable Player: Danny Ildefonso (San Miguel)
- Rookie of the Year: Davonn Harp (Red Bull)
- Sportsmanship Award: Freddie Abuda (San Miguel)
- Most Improved Player: Mark Telan (Shell)
- Defensive Player of the Year: Freddie Abuda (San Miguel)
- Mythical Five
  - Danny Ildefonso (San Miguel)
  - Danny Seigle (San Miguel)
  - Olsen Racela (San Miguel)
  - Alvin Patrimonio (Purefoods)
  - Kenneth Duremdes (Alaska)
- Mythical Second Team
  - Dindo Pumaren (Purefoods)
  - Jeffrey Cariaso (Tanduay)
  - Bong Hawkins (Alaska)
  - Rudy Hatfield (Tanduay)
  - Marlou Aquino (Sta. Lucia)
- All Defensive Team
  - Chris Jackson (Shell)
  - Freddie Abuda (San Miguel)
  - Rey Evangelista (Purefoods)
  - Jeffrey Cariaso (Tanduay)
  - Dindo Pumaren (Purefoods)

=== Awards given by the PBA Press Corps ===
- Coach of the Year: Jong Uichico (San Miguel)
- Mr. Quality Minutes: Boybits Victoria (San Miguel)
- Executive of the Year: Buddy Encarnado (Sta. Lucia)
- Comeback Player of the Year: Ato Agustin (Red Bull)
- Referee of the Year: Ernie de Leon

== Cumulative standings ==
Pos	Team	Pld	W	L	PCT	Best finish
1	San Miguel Beermen	58	40	18	.690	Champions
2	Alaska Milkmen/Aces	49	31	18	.633	Champions
3	Tanduay Rhum Masters	46	28	18	.609	Third place
4	Purefoods TJ Hotdogs	55	27	28	.491	Finalist
5	Sta. Lucia Realtors	45	22	23	.489	Finalist
6	Mobiline Phone Pals	41	18	23	.439	Semifinalist
7	Batang Red Bull Energizers/Thunder	38	16	22	.421	Third place
8	Barangay Ginebra Kings	37	15	22	.405	Quarterfinalist
9	Pop Cola 800s/Sunkist Orange Juicers/Pop Cola Panthers	34	12	22	.353	Quarterfinalist
10	Shell Velocity/Turbo Chargers	33	9	24	.273	Elimination round

=== Elimination round ===
Pos	Team	Pld	W	L	PCT
1	Tanduay Rhum Masters	32	23	9	.719
2	San Miguel Beermen	32	21	11	.656
3	Alaska Milkmen/Aces	32	20	12	.625
4	Purefoods TJ Hotdogs	32	17	15	.531
5	Sta. Lucia Realtors	32	16	16	.500
6	Mobiline Phone Pals	32	16	16	.500
7	Batang Red Bull Energizers/Thunder	32	13	19	.406
8	Barangay Ginebra Kings	32	13	19	.406
9	Pop Cola 800s/Sunkist Orange Juicers/Pop Cola Panthers	32	12	20	.375
10	Shell Velocity/Turbo Chargers	32	9	23	.281

=== Playoffs ===
Pos	Team	Pld	W	L
1	San Miguel Beermen	26	19	7
2	Alaska Milkmen/Aces	17	11	6
3	Purefoods TJ Hotdogs	23	10	13
4	Sta. Lucia Realtors	13	6	7
5	Tanduay Rhum Masters	14	5	9
6	Batang Red Bull Energizers/Thunder	6	3	3
7	Barangay Ginebra Kings	5	2	3
8	Mobiline Phone Pals	9	2	7
9	Pop Cola 800s/Sunkist Orange Juicers/Pop Cola Panthers	2	0	2
10	Shell Velocity/Turbo Chargers	1	0	1
