= 2004–05 PBA Philippine Cup finals =

Philippine basketball championship

Team	Coach	Wins
Barangay Ginebra Kings	Siot Tanquingcen	4
Talk 'N Text Phone Pals	Joel Banal	2
- Dates: January 30 – February 11, 2005
- MVP: Eric Menk
- Television: ABC

PBA Philippine Cup finals chronology
- < 2003 2006 >

PBA finals chronology
- < 2004 Fiesta 2005 Fiesta >

The 2004–05 Philippine Basketball Association (PBA) Philippine Cup finals was the best-of-7 basketball championship series of the 2004–05 PBA Philippine Cup and the conclusion of the conference's playoffs. Barangay Ginebra Kings and Talk 'N Text Phone Pals played for the 88th championship contested by the league.

The Barangay Ginebra won their 6th league championship with a 4–2 series victory over Talk 'N Text.

== Qualification ==
- Barangay Ginebra Kings
  - The top seed qualified for the best-of-seven semifinals outright.
  - Earned bye up to the semifinals.
  - Won semifinals against San Miguel, 3–2.
- Talk 'N Text Phone Pals
  - Finished tied for second with Shell in the group stage.
  - Won second-seed playoff against Shell, 85–79.
  - Won semifinals against Shell, 3–0.

== Roster ==
Barangay Ginebra Kings roster
Players
Coaches

Pos.	#	POB	Name	Height	Weight	DOB (YYYY–MM–DD)	From
G/F	9	(Philippines)	Rodney Santos	6 ft 1 in (1.85 m)			San Sebastian
C	10	(Philippines)	Rommel Adducul	6 ft 6 in (1.98 m)			San Sebastian
G	13	(Philippines)	Jayjay Helterbrand	6 ft 0 in (1.83 m)			Kentucky State
F	14	(Philippines)	Banjo Calpito	6 ft 5 in (1.96 m)			San Sebastian
F	16	(Philippines)	Ernesto Ballesteros	6 ft 3 in (1.91 m)			UST
C	22	(United States)	James Walkvist	6 ft 10 in (2.08 m)
F/C	30	(United States)	Eric Menk	6 ft 6 in (1.98 m)			Lake Superior State
F	34	(Philippines)	Miguel Noble	6 ft 5 in (1.96 m)			Utica
G	47	(Philippines)	Mark Caguioa	6 ft 0 in (1.83 m)			Glendale CC (CA)
C	52	(United States)	Andy Seigle	6 ft 9 in (2.06 m)			LSU New Orleans
F	80	(Philippines)	Sunday Salvacion	6 ft 3 in (1.91 m)			St. Benilde
G	88	(Philippines)	Aries Dimaunahan	6 ft 0 in (1.83 m)			UST

Head coach

- (Philippines) Siot Tanquingcen

Assistant coach(es)

- (Philippines) Binky Favis
- (Philippines) Juno Sauler

Team manager

- (Philippines) Allan Caidic

Legend

- (C) Team captain
- (CI) Commissioner's Cup Import
- (GI) Governors' Cup Import
- (EI) EASL Import
- (DP) Unsigned draft pick
- (FA) Free agent
- (IN) Inactive
- (S) Suspended
- (R) Rookie
- (I) Import
- Injured

Talk 'N Text Phone Pals roster
Players

Pos.	#	POB	Name	Height	Weight	DOB (YYYY–MM–DD)	From
G	1	(Philippines)	Bong Ravena	6 ft 1 in (1.85 m)			UE
G	3	(United States)	Jimmy Alapag	5 ft 9 in (1.75 m)			Cal State San Bernardino
F	4	(United States)	Harvey Carey	6 ft 3 in (1.91 m)			Sonoma State
G	8	(Philippines)	Patrick Fran	6 ft 0 in (1.83 m)			UST
G	11	(Philippines)	Willie Miller	5 ft 10 in (1.78 m)			Letran
F	13	(Philippines)	Mark Telan	6 ft 6 in (1.98 m)			De La Salle
G/F	14	(Philippines)	Niño Gelig	6 ft 2 in (1.88 m)			UST
C	18	(Philippines)	Yancy De Ocampo	6 ft 9 in (2.06 m)			Saint Francis of Assisi
F	20	(Philippines)	Don Camaso	6 ft 6 in (1.98 m)			Metro Manila Colleges
F	24	(Philippines)	Allan Salangsang	6 ft 5 in (1.96 m)			Letran
F	33	(Philippines)	Victor Pablo	6 ft 4 in (1.93 m)			Far Eastern
G	42	(Philippines)	Donbel Belano	5 ft 8 in (1.73 m)			Visayas
C	88	(Tonga)	Asi Taulava	6 ft 9 in (2.06 m)			BYU–Hawaii
G	99	(Philippines)	Jonathan De Guzman	5 ft 11 in (1.80 m)			Adamson
F	00	(United States)	Kahi Villa	6 ft 2 in (1.88 m)			BYU–Hawaii

Coaches

Head coach

- (Philippines) Joel Banal

Assistant coach(es)

- (Philippines) Ariel Vanguardia
- (Philippines) Virgil Villavicencio

Legend

- (C) Team captain
- Injured

== Series summary ==
Team	Game 1	Game 2	Game 3	Game 4	Game 5*	Game 6	Wins
Barangay Ginebra	~~71~~	106	66	85	95	96	4
Talk 'N Text	~~89~~	105	102	90	85	86	2
Venue	Araneta	Araneta	Araneta	Araneta	Araneta	Araneta

*overtime

=== Games ===
ABC

January 30

boxscore

~~Barangay Ginebra Kings 71, Talk 'N Text Phone Pals 89~~
Scoring by quarter: 19–24, 18–22, 16–22, 18–21
Pts: Jimmy Alapag 19; Rebs: Willie Miller 10; Asts: Willie Miller 8	Pts: Eric Menk 23; Rebs: Sunday Salvacion 13; Asts: Rodney Santos 4
~~Talk 'N Text leads series, 1–0~~

Araneta Coliseum, Quezon City
Attendance: 14,093
Referees: Cruz, Montiel, Quilinguen

PBA commissioner Noli Eala forfeits Game 1, 71–89 in favor of Barangay Ginebra since Asi Taulava, who was still suspended by the league, participated in the game.
Barangay Ginebra leads series, 1–0

ABC

February 2

boxscore

Barangay Ginebra Kings 106, Talk 'N Text Phone Pals 105
Scoring by quarter: 35–32, 32–22, 22–24, 17–27
Pts: Eric Menk 27; Rebs: Eric Menk 11; Asts: Mark Caguioa 6	Pts: Willie Miller 22; Rebs: Willie Miller 10; Asts: Willie Miller 10
Barangay Ginebra leads series, 2–0

Araneta Coliseum, Quezon City
Attendance: 8,698
Referees: Ilagan, Ramos, Herrera

ABC

February 4

boxscore

Barangay Ginebra Kings 66, Talk 'N Text Phone Pals 102
Scoring by quarter: 12–25, 20–29, 19–25, 15–23
Pts: Willie Miller 25; Rebs: de Ocampo, Pablo 9 each Asts: Jimmy Alapag 6	Pts: Menk, Caguioa 14 each Rebs: Eric Menk 9 Asts: Aries Dimaunahan 8
Barangay Ginebra leads series, 2–1

Araneta Coliseum, Quezon City
Attendance: 11,149
Referees: Cruz, Calungcaguin, Culanag

ABC

February 6

boxscore

Barangay Ginebra Kings 85, Talk 'N Text Phone Pals 90
Scoring by quarter: 26–19, 21–22, 23–20, 15–29
Pts: Mark Caguioa 43; Rebs: Sunday Salvacion 12; Asts: Eric Menk 5	Pts: Willie Miller 29; Rebs: Yancy de Ocampo 10; Asts: Jimmy Alapag 8
Talk 'N Text ties series, 2–2

Araneta Coliseum, Quezon City
Attendance: 14,257
Referees: Ilagan, Ramos, Aldaba

ABC

February 9

boxscore

Barangay Ginebra Kings 95, Talk 'N Text Phone Pals 85 (2OT)
Scoring by quarter: 14–23, 19–9, 24–26, 16–15, Overtime: 8–8, 14–4
Pts: Victor Pablo 27; Rebs: Victor Pablo 10; Asts: Jimmy Alapag 11	Pts: Mark Caguioa 26; Rebs: Eric Menk 16; Asts: Dimaunahan, Santos 6 each
Barangay Ginebra leads series, 3–2

Araneta Coliseum, Quezon City
Attendance: 11,723
Referees: Cruz, Montiel, Aldaba

ABC

February 11

boxscore

Barangay Ginebra Kings 96, Talk 'N Text Phone Pals 86
Scoring by quarter: 20–14, 22–31, 22–12, 32–29
Pts: Eric Menk 39; Rebs: Eric Menk 19; Asts: Caguioa, Santos 4 each	Pts: Jimmy Alapag 23; Rebs: Mark Telan 12; Asts: Miller, Alapag 4 each
Barangay Ginebra wins series, 4–2

Araneta Coliseum, Quezon City
Attendance: 18,287
Referees: Cruz, Montiel, Culanag

On January 26, 2005, Judge Rogelio Pizarro of the Quezon City Regional Trial Court Branch 222 issued a writ of preliminary mandatory injunction "commanding and directing" the PBA to allow Taulava "to play in the current All Filipino Conference and succeeding Conferences of the PBA" during the term of his contract. This was after Taulava passed citizenship papers that should've allowed him to play in the league; earlier, he was indefinitely suspended from playing after his Filipino citizenship was nullified (only Filipinos are allowed to play in the Philippine Cup).

The PBA Board of Governors refused to honor the court order, upholding Commissioner Noli Eala's suspension of Taulava after consultation with the league's legal counsel. Taulava's lawyer Ed Francisco charged Eala with giving the board wrong legal advice. Taulava did play at game 1, in which Talk 'N Text won easily 89–71. As Taulava was being introduced, the pro-Ginebra crowd jeered him as the outnumbered Talk 'N Text crowd greeted him with cheers, displaying placards with a message "Welcome Back!" Eala himself had considered quitting his commissioner's post as he received a phone call "to make sure that Asi Taulava be allowed to play". After the game, Barangay Ginebra filed a protest to the commissioner's office. Talk 'N Text intends to play Taulava for the entire duration of the series.

Barangay Ginebra reportedly indicated that the team may forfeit the finals series if Taulava continues to be allowed to play and game 1 won't be forfeited. The league has issued a motion for reconsideration on the court order, and Eala said that Talk 'N Text may face sanctions for violating league rules. In a board meeting on February 1, there was a "heated clash" between Eala and Talk 'N Text alternate representative Paul Gueco in which Gueco reportedly challenged Eala to make a decision on the Taulava case by himself and to tell Talk N Text what his decision was, a statement supported by board chairman Buddy Encarnado of the Sta. Lucia Realtors.

Talk 'N Text did not field Taulava in game 2 "in the interest of the Philippine Basketball Association and the public", even though Eala was filed of contempt charges, and Talk 'N Text's game 1 win was forfeited against Ginebra. The Gin Kings won against Talk 'N Text by one point, thanks to Eric Menk's last basket with 5.2 seconds left to play. Ginebra's defense disallowed an attempt from the Phone Pals, leading to the 2–0 series lead.

Francisco pointed out that new rules and regulations covering the eligibility of Filipino-foreign players such as Taulava, who was declared eligible by the PBA based on the Bureau of Immigration clearance and Department of Justice (DOJ) affirmation in 2001, cannot be subject to additional rules or conditions imposed retroactively and any such changes can only be applied prospectively. The DOJ, for its part, considered on intervening and seek a reversal of the court's ruling allowing the cager to play anew in the PBA despite the DOJ's findings that he is not a Filipino; although they won't intervene if the Court of Appeals would rule favorably on the justice department's petition seeking to lift an injunction against it issued by the Manila RTC on the separate issue of Taulava's deportation. DOJ Secretary Raul Gonzalez said that the rulings of the Quezon City and Manila RTC constitute "undue interference by the courts." Parañaque Congressman Eduardo Zialcita would seek a congressional inquiry into Eala's "continued defiance" on the court orders.

Negros Oriental Congressman Jacinto Paras asked the Games and Amusement Board (GAB) to investigate Eala for his "questionable and dictatorial acts" as the PBA is under the direct jurisdiction of the GAB. Meanwhile, the Phone Pals appealed to the Board of Governors to reverse Eala's prior decisions of forfeiting game 1 and for the reinstatement of Taulava. Meanwhile, with all of the publicity, the tournament scored the highest TV ratings in years, with ratings of at least 11% and an audience share of at least 17.4%.

2004–05 Philippine Cup Champions

Barangay Ginebra Kings
Six title

== Finals Most Valuable Player ==
- Eric Menk (Barangay Ginebra Kings)

== Broadcast notes ==
The PBA on ABC broadcast the games nationwide on primetime.
