= PBA Philippine Cup =

Philippine Basketball Association conference

- Current season, competition or edition: 2025–26 PBA Philippine Cup
- The Jun Bernardino Trophy
- Sport: Basketball
- Founded: 1977; 49 years ago
- First season: 1977
- Most recent champion: San Miguel Beermen (12th title) (2026)

The PBA Philippine Cup is one of three active conferences in the Philippine Basketball Association (PBA). In this conference, only Filipino players and players of Filipino descent can compete, meaning that imports are not allowed. Before the 2004–05 season, the tournament was known as the PBA All-Filipino Cup. It is considered the most prestigious of the three conferences in a PBA season.

Since the 2006–07 season, the champions of the Philippine Cup are awarded the Jun Bernardino Trophy, named after former PBA commissioner Jun Bernardino, which they get to keep possession of until the next Philippine Cup champion is crowned. If a team wins three Philippine Cups in a row, that team will have permanent possession of the trophy.

The 1975 and 1976 editions of the tournament were reclassified as an import-laden conference since the league gave the lower-ranking teams the option of hiring imports to bolster their respective lineups. The first tournament that prohibited teams from hiring foreign players or imports was held in 1977. The 1981 and 1982 seasons did not have an All-Filipino Conference.

The San Miguel Beermen have the most Philippine Cup titles with 12 and are the current defending Philippine Cup champions, having defeated the TNT Tropang 5G in the 2025–26 PBA Philippine Cup finals.

== List of All-Filipino/Philippine Cup champions ==
=== Per season ===
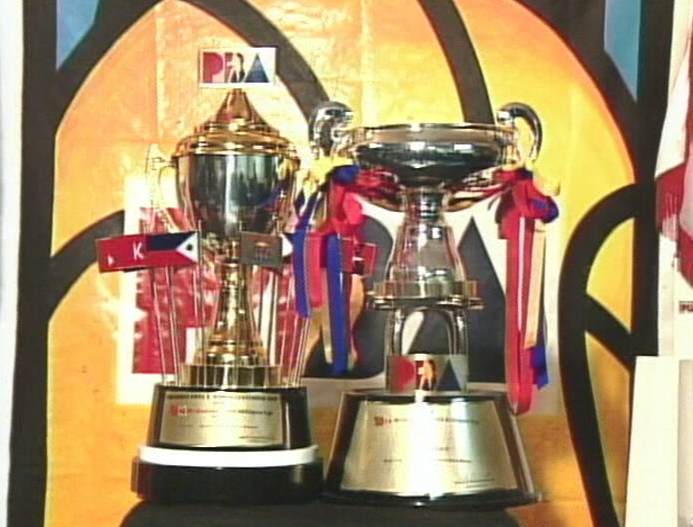
The previous design of the All-Filipino Cup (right) used from 1994 to 2002 together with the FVR Centennial Trophy. Both trophies were awarded to the winner of the 1998 All-Filipino Cup finals.

Won three or more consecutive tournaments
Won two consecutive tournaments

Season	Champion	Runner-up	Series	Details
1975	Tournament was reclassified as an import-laced conference.			
1976	Tournament was reclassified as an import-laced conference.			
1977	Crispa Redmanizers	Mariwasa Panthers	3–2	All-Filipino Conference
1978	Toyota Super Corollas	Filmanbank Bankers	3–1	All-Filipino Conference
1979	Crispa Redmanizers	Toyota Super Corollas	3–2	All-Filipino Conference
1980	Crispa Redmanizers	Toyota Super Corollas	3–1	All-Filipino Conference
1981	No tournament to give way to Manila's hosting of the 1981 Southeast Asian Games.			
1982	No All-Filipino tournament held.			
1983	Crispa Redmanizers	Gilbey's Gin Tonics	3–0	All-Filipino Conference
1984*	Crispa Redmanizers	Great Taste Coffee Makers	4–1	First All-Filipino Conference
1984*	Great Taste Coffee Makers	Beer Hausen Brewmasters	3–0	Second All-Filipino Conference
1985	Great Taste Coffee Makers	Shell Azodrin Bugbusters	3–1	All-Filipino Conference
1986	Tanduay Rhum Makers	Ginebra San Miguel	3–1	All-Filipino Conference
1987	Great Taste Coffee Makers	Hills Bros. Coffee Kings	3–0	All-Filipino Conference
1988	Añejo Rum 65ers	Purefoods Hotdogs	3–1	All-Filipino Conference
1989	San Miguel Beermen	Purefoods Hotdogs	4–2	All-Filipino Conference
1990	Presto Tivolis	Purefoods Hotdogs	4–3	All-Filipino Conference
1991	Purefoods Tender Juicy Hotdogs	Diet Sarsi Sizzlers	3–2	All-Filipino Conference
1992	San Miguel Beermen	Purefoods Tender Juicy Hotdogs	4–3	All-Filipino Conference
1993	Coney Island Ice Cream Stars	San Miguel Beermen	4–2	All-Filipino Cup
1994	San Miguel Beermen	Coney Island Ice Cream Stars	4–2	All-Filipino Cup
1995	Sunkist Orange Juicers	Alaska Milkmen	4–3	All-Filipino Cup
1996	Alaska Milkmen	Purefoods Tender Juicy Hotdogs	4–1	All-Filipino Cup
1997	Purefoods Corned Beef Cowboys	Gordon's Gin Boars	4–2	All-Filipino Cup
1998	Alaska Milkmen	San Miguel Beermen	4–3	All-Filipino Cup
1999	Formula Shell Zoom Masters	Tanduay Rhum Masters	4–2	All-Filipino Cup
2000	Alaska Milkmen	Purefoods Tender Juicy Hotdogs	4–1	All-Filipino Cup
2001	San Miguel Beermen	Barangay Ginebra Kings	4–2	All-Filipino Cup
2002	Coca-Cola Tigers	Alaska Aces	3–1	All-Filipino Cup
2003	Talk 'N Text Phone Pals	Coca-Cola Tigers	4–2	All-Filipino Cup
2004–05	Barangay Ginebra Kings	Talk 'N Text Phone Pals	4–2	Philippine Cup
2005–06	Purefoods Chunkee Giants	Red Bull Barako	4–2	Philippine Cup
2006–07	Barangay Ginebra Kings	San Miguel Beermen	4–2	Philippine Cup
2007–08	Sta. Lucia Realtors	Purefoods Tender Juicy Giants	4–3	Philippine Cup
2008–09	Talk 'N Text Tropang Texters	Alaska Aces	4–3	Philippine Cup
2009–10	Purefoods Tender Juicy Giants	Alaska Aces	4–0	Philippine Cup
2010–11	Talk 'N Text Tropang Texters	San Miguel Beermen	4–2	Philippine Cup
2011–12	Talk 'N Text Tropang Texters	Powerade Tigers	4–1	Philippine Cup
2012–13	Talk 'N Text Tropang Texters	Rain or Shine Elasto Painters	4–0	Philippine Cup
2013–14	San Mig Super Coffee Mixers	Rain or Shine Elasto Painters	4–2	Philippine Cup
2014–15	San Miguel Beermen	Alaska Aces	4–3	Philippine Cup
2015–16	San Miguel Beermen	Alaska Aces	4–3	Philippine Cup
2016–17	San Miguel Beermen	Barangay Ginebra San Miguel	4–1	Philippine Cup
2017–18	San Miguel Beermen	Magnolia Hotshots Pambansang Manok	4–1	Philippine Cup
2019	San Miguel Beermen	Magnolia Hotshots Pambansang Manok	4–3	Philippine Cup
2020	Barangay Ginebra San Miguel	TNT Tropang Giga	4–1	Philippine Cup
2021	TNT Tropang Giga	Magnolia Pambansang Manok Hotshots	4–1	Philippine Cup
2022–23	San Miguel Beermen	TNT Tropang Giga	4–3	Philippine Cup
2023–24	Meralco Bolts	San Miguel Beermen	4–2	Philippine Cup
2024–25	San Miguel Beermen	TNT Tropang 5G	4–2	Philippine Cup
2025–26	San Miguel Beermen	TNT Tropang 5G	4–2	Philippine Cup

* Two all-Filipino conferences were held in 1984.

=== Per franchise ===
Total	Team	Last championship
12	San Miguel	2025–26
6	San Mig Super Coffee/Purefoods/Coney Island	2013–14
6	TNT/Talk 'N Text	2021
5	Crispa*/**	1984 First
4	Barangay Ginebra/Añejo	2020
4	Great Taste/Presto Tivoli*	1990
3	Alaska*	2000
1	Meralco	2024
1	Sta. Lucia*	2007–08
1	Coca-Cola*	2002
1	Shell*	1999
1	Sunkist*	1995
1	Tanduay*	1986
1	Toyota*/**	1978

* Defunct franchise.
**The 1975 and 1976 editions of the tournament are not considered All-Filipino Conferences since the league gave the lower-ranking teams the option of hiring imports to bolster their respective lineups.

== Individual awards ==
=== Best Player of the Conference ===
^	Denotes player who is still active in the PBA
*	Inducted into the PBA Hall of Fame
Player (X)	Denotes the number of times the player has been named BPC

Season	Best Player	Team
1994	Jerry Codiñera	Coney Island
1995	Vergel Meneses	Sunkist
1996	Alvin Patrimonio*	Purefoods
1997	Nelson Asaytono	San Miguel
1998	Nelson Asaytono (2)	San Miguel
1999	Eric Menk	Tanduay
2000	Kenneth Duremdes	Alaska
2001	Danny Ildefonso	San Miguel
2002	Jeffrey Cariaso	Coca-Cola
2003	Asi Taulava	Talk 'N Text
2004–05	Eric Menk (2)	Barangay Ginebra
2006	Danny Seigle	San Miguel
2006–07	Mark Caguioa	Barangay Ginebra
2007–08	Kelly Williams^	Sta. Lucia
2008–09	Willie Miller	Alaska
2009–10	James Yap	Purefoods
2010–11	Jay Washington	San Miguel
2011–12	Gary David	Powerade
2012–13	Jayson Castro^	Talk 'N Text
2013–14	June Mar Fajardo^	Petron
2014–15	June Mar Fajardo^ (2)	San Miguel
2015–16	June Mar Fajardo^ (3)	San Miguel
2016–17	June Mar Fajardo^ (4)	San Miguel
2017–18	June Mar Fajardo^ (5)	San Miguel
2019	June Mar Fajardo^ (6)	San Miguel
2020	Stanley Pringle^	Barangay Ginebra
2021	Calvin Abueva^	Magnolia
2022	June Mar Fajardo^ (7)	San Miguel
2024	June Mar Fajardo^ (8)	San Miguel
2025	June Mar Fajardo^ (9)	San Miguel
2025–26	June Mar Fajardo^ (10)	San Miguel
