= 2004–05 Barangay Ginebra Kings season =

- Head coach: Allan Caidic; Siot Tanquingcen
- General manager: Ira Manaquis (January – February 2004); Eric Altamirano (February–March 2004); Allan Caidic
- Owner: Ginebra San Miguel, Inc.

Fiesta Conference (Transition) results
- Record: 7–11 (38.9%)
- Place: 7th
- Playoff finish: Champions (def. Red Bull 3-1)

Philippine Cup results
- Record: 20–9 (69%)
- Place: 1st
- Playoff finish: Champions (def. Talk 'N Text 4-2)

Fiesta Conference results
- Record: 8–10 (44.4%)
- Place: 9th
- Playoff finish: Wildcard

Barangay Ginebra Kings seasons

The 2004–05 Barangay Ginebra Kings season was the 26th season of the franchise in the Philippine Basketball Association (PBA).

== Transactions ==
Off-season
Jayjay Helterbrand ^{Re-signed by Ginebra}
Miguel Noble ^{Acquired from Alaska Aces}
Rodney Santos ^{Acquired from Purefoods; part of Limpot-Seigle trade}
Andy Seigle ^{Acquired from Purefoods in exchange for Jun Limpot}
Kim Valenzuela ^{Rookie signed; originally pick by Sta.Lucia}

== Occurrences ==
Head coach Allan Caidic was promoted as team manager replacing Eric Altamirano. Altamirano replaced Ira Manaquis who served until first months of 2004. Caidic will be replaced by assistant coach Bethune Tanquingcen after five games into the 2004 Fiesta Conference.

== Championships ==
The Barangay Ginebra Kings won the PBA's transition tournament called Fiesta Conference over Red Bull Barako, 3 games to 1, in the best-of-five title series for their first championship after seven long years, as the team celebrates its fifth overall title on July 7, 2004, defeating Red Bull, 103-86 in Game 4.

As the PBA entered its 30th season with the regular two-conference format, the Barangay Ginebra Kings repeated as champions, the first time in its franchise history, by winning the 2004–2005 Grand Matador Philippine Cup title over the Talk 'N Text Phone Pals, 4 games to 2.

== Awards ==
Eric Menk became the first Ginebra player to win the Most Valuable Player (MVP) honors for the season. Menk also won the finals MVP and Best Player of the Conference Award.

== Roster ==
2004–05 Barangay Ginebra Kings roster
Players
Coaches

Pos.	#	POB	Name	Height	Weight	DOB (YYYY–MM–DD)	From
G	1	(Philippines)	Bal David	5 ft 9 in (1.75 m)			UST
G	3	(Philippines)	Kim Valenzuela	5 ft 9 in (1.75 m)			San Francisco State
G/F	9	(Philippines)	Rodney Santos	6 ft 1 in (1.85 m)			San Sebastian
C	10	(Philippines)	Rommel Adducul	6 ft 6 in (1.98 m)			San Sebastian
G	12	(Philippines)	Edgar Echavez	5 ft 9 in (1.75 m)
G	13	(Philippines)	Jayjay Helterbrand	6 ft 0 in (1.83 m)			Kentucky State
F	14	(Philippines)	Aramis Calpito	6 ft 5 in (1.96 m)			San Sebastian
F	16	(Philippines)	Ernesto Ballesteros	6 ft 3 in (1.91 m)			UST
C	22	(United States)	James Walkvist	6 ft 10 in (2.08 m)
F/C	30	(United States)	Eric Menk	6 ft 6 in (1.98 m)			Lake Superior State
F	34	(Philippines)	Miguel Noble	6 ft 5 in (1.96 m)			Utica
G	47	(Philippines)	Mark Caguioa	6 ft 0 in (1.83 m)			Glendale CC (CA)
C	52	(United States)	Andy Seigle	6 ft 9 in (2.06 m)			LSU New Orleans
F	80	(Philippines)	Sunday Salvacion	6 ft 3 in (1.91 m)			St. Benilde
G	88	(Philippines)	Aries Dimaunahan	6 ft 0 in (1.83 m)			UST
F	26	(United States)	Rosell Ellis (I)	6 ft 6 in (1.98 m)			McNeese State
F		(United States)	George Reese (I)	6 ft 7 in (2.01 m)			Ohio State
F/C	21	(United States)	Torraye Braggs (I)	6 ft 8 in (2.03 m)			Xavier
C	5	(United States)	Ed Elisma (I)	6 ft 9 in (2.06 m)			Georgia Tech
C		(United States)	Andre Brown (I)	6 ft 9 in (2.06 m)			DePaul
F/C		(United States)	Hiram Fuller (I)	6 ft 9 in (2.06 m)			Fresno State

Head coach

- (Philippines) Siot Tanquingcen

Assistant coach(es)

- (Philippines) Binky Favis
- (Philippines) Juno Sauler

Team manager

- (Philippines) Allan Caidic

Legend

- (C) Team captain
- (CI) Commissioner's Cup Import
- (GI) Governors' Cup Import
- (EI) EASL Import
- (DP) Unsigned draft pick
- (FA) Free agent
- (IN) Inactive
- (S) Suspended
- (R) Rookie
- (I) Import
- Injured

== Philippine Cup ==
=== Game log ===
2004–05 PBA Philippine Cup game log
October

Game	Date	Opponent	Score	High points	High rebounds	High assists	Location Attendance	Record
1	October 6	Purefoods	87–104	Caguioa (20)			Araneta Coliseum	0–1
2	October 10	Sta.Lucia	88-84	Helterbrand (23)	Menk (16)		Araneta Coliseum	1–1
3	October 13	San Miguel	72–83	Adducul (15)			Araneta Coliseum	1–2
4	October 21	FedEx	126-121	Caguioa (39)			Dipolog	2–2
5	October 24	Shell	81–86	Helterbrand (24)			Araneta Coliseum	2–3
6	October 27	Talk 'N Text	91-80	Menk (22)			Araneta Coliseum	3–3

December

Game	Date	Opponent	Score	High points	High rebounds	High assists	Location Attendance	Record
14	December 9	Shell					Urdaneta City	10–4
15	December 12	Alaska	88–102	Menk (24)			Araneta Coliseum	10–5
16	December 17	Red Bull	107-89	Menk (26)			Ynares Center	11–5
17	December 21	San Miguel					Laoag City	12–5
18	December 25	Talk 'N Text	108-102	Helterbrand (33)			Cuneta Astrodome	13–5

2004–05 schedule

== Recruited imports ==
Tournament	Name	#	Height	From	GP
2004 PBA Fiesta Conference	Rosell Ellis		6 ft 6 in (1.98 m)	McNeese State	3
2004 PBA Fiesta Conference	George Reese		6 ft 6 in (1.98 m)	Ohio State	3
2004 PBA Fiesta Conference	Torraye Braggs	21	6 ft 7 in (2.01 m)	Xavier University	23
2005 PBA Fiesta Conference	Eddie Elisma	2	6 ft 7 in (2.01 m)	Georgia Tech	10
2005 PBA Fiesta Conference	Andre Brown		6 ft 8 in (2.03 m)	DePaul University	7
2005 PBA Fiesta Conference	Hiram Fuller		6 ft 8 in (2.03 m)	Cal State-Fresno	3

^{GP – Games played}
