= 2006–07 PBA Philippine Cup finals =

Basketball cup finals

Team	Coach	Wins
Barangay Ginebra Kings	Jong Uichico	4
San Miguel Beermen	Chot Reyes	2
- Dates: February 9–23
- MVP: Jayjay Helterbrand
- Television: ABC
- Radio network: Radyo PBA

PBA Philippine Cup finals chronology
- < 2006 2007–08 >

PBA finals chronology
- < 2006 Philippine 2007 Fiesta >

The 2006–07 PBA Philippine Cup finals was the championship series of the 2006-07 PBA season's 2006-07 PBA Philippine Cup of the Philippine Basketball Association (PBA). The series was a best of seven affair and was the 92nd championship disputed in the league. The teams competing are first-seed Barangay Ginebra Kings and the second-seed San Miguel Beermen, two of the four San Miguel Corporation-owned teams.

San Miguel won the first two games of the series, with Game 2 going down to the wire; Ginebra then won the next two games with 30-point leads. In the pivotal fifth game, the Beermen faltered in the end game as the Kings lead the series for the first time. San Miguel led by a large margin in Game 6 but the Kings cut the lead and eventually came from behind to win the game, and their seventh championship, with Ginebra point guard Jayjay Helterbrand winning finals MVP honors.

== Qualification ==
- Barangay Ginebra Kings
  - Finished tied for first with San Miguel in the group stage; tie broken over games between tied teams with a point difference of +1 in favor of Barangay Ginebra.
  - Earned bye up to the semifinals.
  - Won semifinals against Talk 'N Text, 4–2.
- San Miguel Beermen
  - Finished tied for first with Barangay Ginebra in the group stage; tie broken over games between tied teams with a point difference of +1 in favor of Barangay Ginebra.
  - Earned bye up to the semifinals.
  - Won semifinals against Red Bull, 4–3.

== Rosters ==
Barangay Ginebra Kings roster
Players
Coaches

Pos.	#	POB	Name	Height	Weight	DOB (YYYY–MM–DD)	From
C	2	(Philippines)	Billy Mamaril	6 ft 6 in (1.98 m)			Bakersfield
C	4	(United States)	Rafi Reavis	6 ft 8 in (2.03 m)			Coppin State
G	13	(Philippines)	Jayjay Helterbrand	5 ft 11 in (1.80 m)			Kentucky State
G	14	(Philippines)	Johnny Abarrientos	5 ft 8 in (1.73 m)			Far Eastern
G	18	(Philippines)	Mark Macapagal	6 ft 2 in (1.88 m)			San Sebastian
C	30	(United States)	Eric Menk	6 ft 6 in (1.98 m)			Lake Superior State
F/C	45	(United States)	Michael Holper	6 ft 6 in (1.98 m)			San Diego State
G	47	(Philippines)	Mark Caguioa	6 ft 1 in (1.85 m)			Glendale CC (CA)
C	52	(United States)	Andy Seigle	6 ft 10 in (2.08 m)			LSU New Orleans
G/F	71	(Philippines)	Ronald Tubid	6 ft 1 in (1.85 m)			UE
G	80	(Philippines)	Sunday Salvacion	6 ft 3 in (1.91 m)			St. Benilde
F	99	(United States)	Rudy Hatfield	6 ft 3 in (1.91 m)			Michigan-Dearborn

Head coach

- (Philippines) Jong Uichico

Assistant coach(es)

- (Philippines) Arturo dela Cruz
- (Philippines) Siot Tanquingcen
- (Philippines) Juno Sauler

Legend

- (C) Team captain
- (CI) Commissioner's Cup Import
- (GI) Governors' Cup Import
- (EI) EASL Import
- (DP) Unsigned draft pick
- (FA) Free agent
- (IN) Inactive
- (S) Suspended
- (R) Rookie
- Injured

San Miguel Beermen roster
Players

Pos.	#	POB	Name	Height	Weight	DOB (YYYY–MM–DD)	From
F	2	(Philippines)	Gabby Espinas	6 ft 4 in (1.93 m)			Philippine Christian
C	4	(United States)	Dorian Peña	6 ft 6 in (1.98 m)			Coppin State
G	6	(Philippines)	LA Tenorio	5 ft 9 in (1.75 m)			Ateneo
G	7	(Philippines)	Dondon Hontiveros	6 ft 2 in (1.88 m)			Cebu
F/C	10	(Philippines)	Danny Ildefonso	6 ft 6 in (1.98 m)			National-U
F	15	(Philippines)	Wesley Gonzales	6 ft 4 in (1.93 m)			Ateneo
G	17	(Philippines)	Olsen Racela	5 ft 10 in (1.78 m)			Ateneo
F	27	(United States)	Willie Wilson	6 ft 3 in (1.91 m)			De La Salle
G/F	30	(Philippines)	Lordy Tugade	6 ft 3 in (1.91 m)			National-U
F	42	(United States)	Danny Seigle	6 ft 6 in (1.98 m)			Wagner
F/C	82	(Philippines)	Rommel Adducul	6 ft 6 in (1.98 m)			San Sebastian
G	88	(Philippines)	Chris Calaguio	6 ft 2 in (1.88 m)			Letran

Coaches
Head coach
- (Philippines) Chot Reyes
Assistant(s)
- (Philippines) Pido Jarencio
- (Philippines) Biboy Ravanes
- (Philippines) Eric Altamirano
- (Philippines) Nash Racela
- (Philippines) Aboy Castro

Legend
- (DP) Unsigned draft pick
- (FA) Free agent
- (S) Suspended
- Injured

San Miguel's Danny Seigle is the younger brother of Ginebra's Andy Seigle. Both Ginebra and San Miguel are owned by San Miguel Corporation (SMC). Ginebra coach Jong Uichico was San Miguel's coach when they last won the championship; Uichico was transferred to Ginebra when Chot Reyes was hired by SMC as the new Beermen coach, after Reyes coached the SMC-backed national team and the Coca-Cola Tigers, another SMC-owned PBA team. Siot Tanquingcen, Ginebra's head coach, was demoted to assistant coach capacity; he was previously Uichico's assistant at San Miguel.

== Series scoring summary ==
Team	Game 1	Game 2	Game 3	Game 4	Game 5	Game 6	Wins
Barangay Ginebra	94	101	131	146	94	96	4
San Miguel	118	104	101	111	82	94	2
Venue	Araneta	Araneta	Cuneta	Araneta	Araneta	Araneta

== Games summary ==
=== Game 1 ===
ABC

February 9
19:30

boxscore

Barangay Ginebra Kings 94, San Miguel Beermen 118
Scoring by quarter: 23–29, 19–33, 30–27, 22–29
Pts: Caguioa 30, Hatfield 22, Tubid 12, Abarrientos 12, Helterbrand 6, Salvacion 5, Reavis 4, Mamaril 2, Macapagal 1, Holper 0, Seigle 0	Pts: Tugade 27, Seigle 22, Peña 18, Tenorio 12, Calaguio 10, Wilson 7, Racela 7, Hontiveros 6, Adducul 5, Espinas 2, Gonzales 2
San Miguel leads series, 1–0.

Araneta Coliseum, Quezon City
Attendance: 14,560

Prior to the game, the new perpetual trophy was presented.

The Beermen had an unconventional starting lineup, with Olsen Racela sitting on the bench being replaced by LA Tenorio, which caused Jayjay Helterbrand's offensive game to start badly as Tenorio kept tight defense. Red Bull transfer Lordy Tugade, in his third straight Finals appearance, converted three-pointers as Mark Caguioa wasn't able to get support from his teammates.

The Beermen, especially Dorian Peña were able to convert several "and one" conversions. Ginebra fell behind by 20 points by halftime and were not able to catch up.

=== Game 2 ===
ABC

February 11
19:00

boxscore

San Miguel Beermen 104, Barangay Ginebra Kings 101
Scoring by quarter: 27–30, 29–26, 27–17, 21–32
Pts: Seigle 31, Hontiveros 22, Tugade 19, Racela 11, Tenorio 9, Adducul 5, Calaguio 3, Wilson 2, Peña 2, Espinas 0, Gonzales 0	Pts: Caguioa 32, Hatfield 20, Helterbrand 12, Reavis 10, Salvacion 7, Mamaril 6, Tubid 4, Menk 4, Abarrientos 4, Macapagal 2
San Miguel leads series, 2–0.

Araneta Coliseum, Quezon City
Attendance: 14,702

In the second game, the Kings managed to keep the scores close up to halftime. By the third quarter, SMB unleashed a run to lead by 14 by the end of the third quarter. The Kings crept up to tie 99-all in the final two minutes. Danny Seigle converted a lay-up from an Olsen Racela pass to put the Beermen up, 101–99.

After a Ginebra timeout, Rafi Reavis was fouled on the inbounds play. Reavis, a poor free throw shooter, missed both free throws. Wilson split his own charities on the other end as the Beermen almost bungled a 2–0 series lead.

=== Game 3 ===
ABC

February 14
19:00

boxscore

Barangay Ginebra Kings 131, San Miguel Beermen 101
Scoring by quarter: 23–26, 33–29, 43–26, 32–20
Pts: Hatfield 28, Caguioa 26, Tubid 19, Helterbrand 14, Reavis 13, Menk 12, Salvacion 9, Abarrientos 6, Holper 2, Mamaril 2, Macapagal 0	Pts: Seigle 26, Tugade 25, Wilson 10, Racela 10, Tenorio 8, Calaguio 8, Peña 7, Hontiveros 5, Adducul 2, Espinas 0, Gonzales 0
San Miguel leads series, 2–1.

Cuneta Astrodome, Pasay

Ginebra outclassed San Miguel as the Kings notched their first win in the series with a 30-point blowout held at the Cuneta Astrodome as the Araneta Coliseum was used for a Valentine's Day concert.

Ginebra outscored San Miguel 43–26 in the third quarter in which the Kings pulled away for good as six Kings scored in double figures. The Kings prevented a San Miguel series sweep as they stopped a two-game losing streak.

=== Game 4 ===
ABC

February 16
19:00

boxscore

San Miguel Beermen 111, Barangay Ginebra Kings 146
Scoring by quarter: 24–32, 25–39, 29–45, 33–30
Pts: Hontiveros 20, Seigle 18, Peña 18, Calaguio 15, Racela 10, Ildefonso 6, Adducul 5, Espinas 4, Tugade 4, Wilson 4, Gonzales 2	Pts: Caguioa 25, Helterbrand 21, Salvacion 20, Menk 15, Hatfield 14, Abarrientos 11, Tubid 9, Macapagal 8, Mamaril 7, Reavis 7, Holper 5, Seigle 4
Series tied, 2–2.

Araneta Coliseum, Quezon City
Attendance: 13,471

Prior to the game, Mark Caguioa was named as Best Player of the Conference besting San Miguel's Danny Seigle, teammate Rudy Hatfield, Alaska's Willie Miller and Sta. Lucia's Kelly Williams.

With the game starting as a close affair, the Kings pulled away at the second quarter to finish with another blowout of the Beermen. Five technical fouls were called in the game.

Ginebra's 146 points is the most points scored by a team in a game in the current conference.

=== Game 5 ===
ABC

February 21
19:00

boxscore

Barangay Ginebra Kings 94, San Miguel Beermen 82
Scoring by quarter: 25–25, 17–12, 30–31, 22–14
Pts: Caguioa 28, Helterbrand 26, Salvacion 12, Hatfield 10, Menk7, Tubid 5, Reavis 4, Mamaril 2, Abarrientos 0	Pts: Seigle 24, Tenorio 17, Hontiveros 11, Racela 10, Tugade 9, Peña 4, Adducul 3, Gonzales 2, Ildefonso 2, Wilson 0, Calaguio 0
Barangay Ginebra leads series, 3–2.

Araneta Coliseum, Quezon City
Attendance: 14,014

Ginebra and San Miguel broke off the three straight blowout wins as they engaged themselves in a close affair, with Ginebra mostly taking the upper hand.

By the fourth quarter, the Kings began to pull away, leading by as much as 11 points. San Miguel cut the lead, thanks to back-to-back three-pointers by Lordy Tugade. With Ginebra suing for time, and the Beermen trailing by five points, the Kings pounded the lane as the Beermen, already in the penalty situation, surrendered fouls.

The Kings converted most of their free throw attempts as they wrestled the game and the series lead against San Miguel.

=== Game 6 ===
ABC

February 23
19:00

boxscore

San Miguel Beermen 94, Barangay Ginebra Kings 96
Scoring by quarter: 23–22, 23–12, 21–27, 27–35
Pts: Hontiveros 19, Seigle 16, Racela 14, Gonzales 10, Peña 10, Tugade 9, Ildefonso 8, Adducul 5, Tenorio 3, Wilson 0	Pts: Helterbrand 20, Salvacion 18, Caguioa 17, Tubid 12, Hatfield 11, Reavis 8, Mamaril 7, Abarrientos 3, Menk 0
Barangay Ginebra wins series, 4–2.

Araneta Coliseum, Quezon City
Attendance: 17,975

Facing elimination, the Beermen broke away from the tightly-contested first quarter to lead by 12 points at halftime.

Beermen Chot Reyes benched Best Player of the Conference runner-up Danny Seigle at the start of the third quarter; Ginebra then managed to cut the lead with plays from Helterbrand and Caguioa. With Ginebra rallying and the Ginebra crowd getting louder, Seigle suited back up for the Beermen at the middle of the third quarter as they managed to keep safe distance between them and the Kings.

At the start of the fourth quarter, Ginebra leaned on Johnny Abarrientos and NCAA MVP Sunday Salvacion to cut the lead; Reavis and Mamaril struggled from the foul line even though Beermen generally struggled from the field with Ginebra's zone defense. Ginebra led 92–91 but Lordy Tugade held off Ginebra's advances, with a three-pointer to lead 94–92. Salvacion, who scored eight points in the payoff period, converted a long two-pointer to tie the score, 94-all.

Dondon Hontiveros then missed a lay-up on the other end. San Miguel then grabbed the offensive rebound, with Tugade missing the three-pointer. Helterbrand, on his way out of bounds, caught the ball and called a time-out.

With Kings coach Jong Uichico drawing the play, Reyes put defensive specialist Willy Wilson into the game for the first time. After the inbounds pass, Helterbrand drove towards to the basket. Although Helterbrand missed the lay-up attempt, Wilson was called for a shooting foul, which caused Helterbrand to shoot two free throws, with 2.9 on the clock.

Helterbrand converted both free throws as San Miguel sued for time. On the inbounds pass, Olsen Racela passed to a tightly-guarded Tugade at the corner; Tugade missed the three-pointer; Racela rebounded the ball as time expired when his putback off the glass, which could have sent the game into overtime.

2006–07 Philippine Cup Champions

Barangay Ginebra Kings
Seventh title

== Finals Most Valuable Player ==
- Jayjay Helterbrand (Barangay Ginebra Kings)

== Broadcast notes ==
The PBA on ABC broadcast the games nationwide on primetime; The Filipino Channel will broadcast the series internationally.

Commentators included Ed Picson, Mico Halili, Quinito Henson, and Tommy Manotoc Courtside Reporters included Eric Reyes, Paolo Trillo, Peaches Aberin, Dominic Uy and Jason Webb.
