= Mark Caguioa =

Filipino basketball player (born 1979)

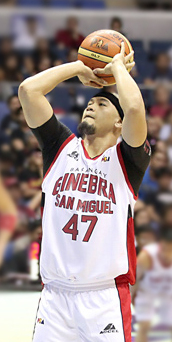
- Caguioa with Barangay Ginebra in 2013

Personal information
- Born: November 19, 1979 (age 46) San Juan, Philippines
- Listed height: 6 ft 2 in (1.88 m)
- Listed weight: 189 lb (86 kg)

Career information
- High school: Eagle Rock (Los Angeles, California)
- College: Glendale CC (1997–1999)
- PBA draft: 2001: 1st round, 3rd overall pick
- Drafted by: Barangay Ginebra Kings
- Playing career: 2001–2020
- Position: Shooting guard
- Number: 47, 13

Career history
- 2001–2020: Barangay Ginebra Kings / Barangay Ginebra San Miguel

Career highlights
- 9× PBA champion (2004 Fiesta, 2004–05 Philippine, 2007 Philippine, 2008 Fiesta, 2016 Governors', 2017 Governors', 2018 Commissioner's, 2019 Governors', 2020 Philippine); PBA Most Valuable Player (2012); 3× Best Player of the Conference (2007 Philippine, 2012 Commissioner's, 2012 Governors'); 13× PBA All-Star (2001, 2004–2008, 2011–2013, 2015–2017, 2019); 3× Mythical First Team (2008, 2011, 2012); 2× Mythical Second Team (2005, 2006); PBA Rookie of the Year (2001); PBA Comeback Player of the Year (2012); PBA Order of Merit (2011); 3× PBA Scoring Champion (2005–2007); Mr. Quality Minutes (2001); 50 Greatest Players in PBA History (2015 selection); 2× PSA Professional Cager of the Year (2007, 2012)

Mark Anthony Yu Caguioa (born November 19, 1979) is a Filipino former professional basketball player. He played his whole career for the Barangay Ginebra San Miguel of the Philippine Basketball Association (PBA). Known as The Spark and as MC47 from his initials and his jersey number, he is also half of "The Fast and The Furious", along with his former backcourt partner, Jayjay Helterbrand.

== Early life ==
Caguioa was born and raised in San Juan. At eight years old, he scored 47 points in a barangay kids' league. When he was 10, he and his family moved to the US, where his father worked as a cable technician and his mother worked for a company that made heart pacemakers. He spent his adolescent years in Eagle Rock, Los Angeles, California. In 1997, Caguioa graduated from Eagle Rock High School. In his time there, he won two MVPs, averaged 26 points and 14 rebounds, and set a program record of 1,154 points in two years.

== Collegiate career ==
Caguioa played collegiate basketball at Glendale Community College. He was named to the First Team All-Western State Conference after the 1999–2000 season. After that season, he was offered a scholarship to play for University of Hawaii at Hilo but turned it down to play in the PBA.

== Professional career ==
=== Barangay Ginebra (2001–2020) ===
==== Rookie season ====
In 2001, Caguioa was drafted by the Barangay Ginebra Kings as the third overall pick. Expectations were not high as Caguioa started as a role player and backup for superstar Vergel Meneses. However, after showing strong performances and helping to lead the Kings to the 2001 All-Filipino Cup finals, he became very popular. With his crossovers, drives to the basket, and penchant for making clutch plays, Caguioa earned the respect and admiration of the Filipino basketball fans. His exciting brand of play earned him the moniker "The Spark." He made his first All-Star team in his rookie season by getting the second-most votes, just behind Danny Seigle. At the end of his first season, Caguioa became the fourth Ginebra player, after Willie Generalao in 1980, Dondon Ampalayo in 1986 and Marlou Aquino in 1996, to win the Rookie of the Year award.

==== "Bandana Bros" ====
During his rookie season, Caguioa had bonded with backcourt partner Jayjay Helterbrand. They became known as the "Bandana Bros". In his sophomore season, he scored 10 of his 26 points in a 2002 All-Filipino Cup win over the Sta. Lucia Realtors. Ginebra also acquired Eric Menk that season, giving Caguioa a frontcourt partner who could consistently notch double-doubles. He then had 22 points against the Alaska Aces, but had back-to-back turnovers in the final minute of the game that led to the loss.

In the 2003 season, Helterbrand left the team as he and Ginebra failed to work on a contract together. Caguioa and Ginebra started off with three straight losses. They finally got their first win against the FedEx Express, in which he scored 24 points. During the Reinforced Conference, he got into a fight with Lordy Tugade of the Red Bull Thunder, and was fined P20,000. That conference, they qualified for the quarterfinals.

==== "The Fast and The Furious" ====
In the 2004–05 season, Caguioa and Helterbrand got back together, as Helterbrand returned from his hiatus. Before the season started, they won the 2004 Fiesta Conference, a transitional tournament. Their success together led to them being dubbed as "The Fast and The Furious". He also signed a contract worth P14.7 million for three and a half years. Caguioa then set what was his career high for points in a single game during that season, scoring 43 points in Game 4 of the Philippine Cup finals against the Talk 'N Text Phone Pals. Despite losing that game, Ginebra won the next two games of the finals to claim the title. During the 2005 Fiesta Conference, he scored 40 points in a win over the Realtors. The Realtors got their revenge on him the next time they met, as he was limited to just 11 points. That conference, they lost in the quarterfinals to Red Bull. He got into the Mythical Second Team that season.

In a win over Sta. Lucia during the 05–06 Fiesta Conference, he had 19 points, 10 rebounds, four assists and three steals while going up against fellow Eagle Rock HS alumnus Alex Cabagnot. That performance earned him Player of the Week honors. In a win over the Express, he didn't score much, as Helterbrand handled the offense with 15 points and nine assists, but limited Renren Ritualo to 14 points. In a Christmas match against Alaska, he had 25 points to send Ginebra to the playoffs. During the semifinals against Red Bull, he suffered a hamstring injury as Ginebra went down 3–1. Helterbrand also struggled in that series. Despite their struggles, they would rally Ginebra to forcing a Game 7, where they eventually lost the series. In the 2006 Philippine Cup, Caguioa earned Player of the Week honors three times. He had strong performances throughout the conference, which included 39 points in a win over the Talk 'N Text Phone Pals, 23 points and 10 rebounds in a win over Sta. Lucia, and a career-high 45 points in a win over the Express. He was also fined P80,000 that conference for not participating in that year's All-Star Weekend. He got Ginebra to the quarterfinals that conference, where they were eliminated by Red Bull. That season, he was on the Mythical Second Team once again.

To start the 2006–07 season, Caguioa scored 21 points in a win over the Welcoat Dragons. In the 2006–07 Philippine Cup, his conference-high in points was 35 points which he scored in a win over the Express. Helterbrand contributed 25 points in that win. During their series against Talk 'N Text in the semifinals, Caguioa scored 34, 31, 26, 35, and 31 points in five games as they returned to the finals. Caguioa then won the PBA Best Player of the Conference Award, as he averaged 24.7 points, 4.9 rebounds, and 4.4 assists per game. He and Helterbrand piloted Ginebra to their seventh championship in franchise history by besting the San Miguel Beermen in six games, with Helterbrand winning Finals MVP. He also got to the 5,000 point milestone in the title-clinching game. He led the league in scoring at 24 points per game, becoming the first guard to finish a single season as the league's leading scorer since Allan Caidic in 1995. After the conference, he, Helterbrand and Rudy Hatfield were loaned to the RP National Team, and had to miss most of the following conference. This put him out of the running for MVP.

Caguioa once again led his team during the 2008 PBA Fiesta Conference, pulling Ginebra from the bottom of the standings with a 39-point performance against the Express. This got him another Player of the Week award. He then missed several games due to an ankle injury. He returned with 14 points, three rebounds and two steals as Ginebra (led by Helterbrand's 27 points on five three pointers) got its third straight win. Helterbrand had been stepping up since Caguioa's injury, as he won two Player of the Week awards in Caguioa's absence. Caguioa then won another Player of the Week award as Ginebra secured a spot in the quarterfinals. He shared this award with the Express's Gary David. In Game 1 of the quarterfinals, he scored 30 points to lead Ginebra to the win. Ginebra moved on to the semifinals, where they faced Red Bull. In that series, he and Helterbrand were the leading scorers as they swept Red Bull. The duo became the leading contenders for the Best Player of the Conference award, with Helterbrand claiming the award and their import teammate Chris Alexander winning the Best Import award. Their efforts culminated in winning the team's eighth championship against the Express. However, he was fined P5,000 for a flagrant foul penalty 1 on Arwind Santos. He lost the scoring title he held the previous season to James Yap.

In the 2008–09 season, Caguioa failed to suit up for Kings due to his therapy in the United States for tendinitis on both knees. Once again, Helterbrand stepped up as the leader of team in Caguioa's absence. Caguioa's return the following season was delayed due to a swollen knee.

==== Struggles and MVP season ====
Caguioa made his return in a win over Talk 'N Text during the 2009–10 Philippine Cup, in which he scored eight points in the fourth quarter. In that conference, they made it to the semifinals against Alaska, where in a Game 1 loss, he had a game-high 23 points. In a match against the Express during the 2010 Fiesta Conference, he hit a referee hard with the ball, resulting in him being given a flagrant foul penalty 2 and being ejected from the game before halftime. He was then suspended for one game. Later in the conference, he scored 20 points in a win over Alaska, while Menk led the team with 25 points. He then had 19 points in a win over the Barako Energy Coffee Masters. In that conference, Ginebra was eliminated by Alaska in the quarterfinals, as he struggled in that series.

Ginebra started the 2010–11 Philippine Cup with a 1–2 record. Caguioa then led Ginebra with 18 points and four rebounds in a win over Barako. This kickstarted a six-game winning streak which also saw him score 14 fourth quarter points in a rematch against Barako. Ginebra got into the quarterfinals where in two games he had back-to-back 20-point performances off the bench to lead Ginebra to the semis past Alaska. In the semis against San Miguel, Ginebra went down 2–0 but won Game 3 due to his 17 points and 12 rebounds as a starter. Ginebra still lost to San Miguel in six games. In the Commissioner's Cup, he led Ginebra back to the semis with 30 points and 11 rebounds in a do-or-die Game 3 against the Rain or Shine Elasto Painters. He then led them to the finals, where they faced Talk 'N Text. In the finals, they lost in six games. That season, he could have made his sixth All-Star appearance, but backed out due to a family emergency. During the Governors' Cup, he had 19 points, five rebounds, and six assists in a win over the B-Meg Llamados. This earned him a Player of the Week award. He and Helterbrand then scored the final four points in a clutch win over Rain or Shine. He then scored a season-high 33 points with nine rebounds in a win over B-Meg, and claimed his second Player of the Week award. At the end of the season, he was in the running for MVP, but lost to Jimmy Alapag. He did receive the PBA's Order of Merit for winning the most Best Player of the Week awards.

In the offseason, Caguioa signed a two-year contract worth P8.4 million. In a low-scoring game against the Powerade Tigers, Caguioa led Ginebra with 11 points, with his last four allowing Ginebra to win the game. He then had 22 points and three assists in a win over the Petron Blaze Boosters, with his last assist leading to the go-ahead basket by Willy Wilson. In the 2012 Commissioner's Cup, he had 31 points in a win over Powerade as Ginebra started with a record of 3–1. He then earned a Player of the Week award for a 25-point performance in a win over Barako. Ginebra got an automatic spot in the semifinals for that conference. On March 30, 2012, he suffered an eye injury, and he missed the semifinals, where they were eliminated by B-Meg. For leading Ginebra to the semis, he received a Best Player of the Conference for the Commissioner's Cup with averages of 16.9 points, 6.4 rebounds, 2.4 assists and a steal per game in 32.6 minutes. He made his return during the Governors' Cup in a win over the Express, in which he had 15 points. Against Petron, he finished a 15–2 run by Ginebra by making two clutch triples and three clutch free throws that led to Ginebra taking the win. He finished that game with 19 points and three rebounds. Against Alaska, he had 22 points, five rebounds, four assists and three steals to overcome a 16-point deficit and get the win. Once again, Ginebra automatically qualified for the semis, this time with a win over Barako in which he had 22 points. Against TNT, he scored 32 points, four rebounds and four steals but TNT still won. In a rematch against Petron, on the night Robert Jaworski's jersey was retired by Ginebra, he led with 25 points, and Ginebra won that game off a floater from Cedric Bozeman. Ginebra didn't make it to the finals, as they lost to B-Meg off a putback play from PJ Simon. That conference, he received his second of back to back Best Player of the Conference awards. For the 2011–2012 season, he won the Most Valuable Player award, despite not leading Ginebra to any finals appearance that season. He also won the Comeback Player of the Year award for his performance after his eye injury.

==== New backcourt partner ====
Before the start of the 2012–13 season, Ginebra acquired veteran point guard LA Tenorio to join Caguioa in the backcourt, moving Helterbrand to the bench. Against Rain or Shine during the Philippine Cup, the new duo joined forces in the clutch to combine for 42 points and start Ginebra off 2–0. Caguioa then had 21 points against Barako, but lost as he and Tenorio missed shots in the clutch. This led to a five-game losing streak. They broke their losing streak in a win over the GlobalPort Batang Pier, in which he had 19 points, four assists and three steals. He then had a double-double of 22 points and 11 rebounds in a win over Talk 'N Text despite suffering a cut in his eye early in the first quarter. For his performances in Ginebra's last two wins, he got a Player of the Week award. The following week, he won it again, this time for his 13 fourth quarter points in a win over Alaska (he finished with 24 points). In the best-of-three quarterfinals against Rain or Shine, they lost their first game, as he and Tenorio only combined for 22 points. He bounced back the following game with 17 points, seven rebounds, and played good defense on Paul Lee in the final seconds of the game to tie the series. In Game 3, he shot poorly making as he was bothered by Rain or Shine's defense, and their campaign in that conference ended. In the Commissioner's Cup, Ginebra lost their first four games before they won against Barako. They got their second win of the conference against the San Mig Coffee Mixers, in which he had 25 points while Tenorio had a double-double of 12 points and 13 assists. Ginebra got its second straight win against Talk 'N Text, in which he had 28 points and Tenorio had 20. His play that conference led fans to give him a new nickname, "Pinoy Vino". In a game against the Meralco Bolts, he slipped and hurt his left knee, and had to leave the game. The injury was revealed to be a grade 1 MCL sprain. Despite his absence, Ginebra got to the semifinals. He made his return in Game 5 of the semis, in which Ginebra defeated Talk 'N Text to return to the finals. There, they were swept by Alaska. In the Governors' Cup, Ginebra lost their first game, but bounced back with a win over Meralco in which he had 15 points while Tenorio had a career-high 34 points. After a loss to Alaska, he criticized the referees on his Twitter account for not calling certain fouls and travels. The league fined him P20,000 for his statements. In a win against Rain or Shine, he had a conference-high 32 points off the bench. In the quarterfinals against Petron, he slipped on the court and twisted his knee. The injury was revealed to be another MCL sprain.

With Ginebra eliminated by Petron, Caguioa recovered from his injury during the offseason. During the 2013–14 Philippine Cup, he scored 22 points on 9-of-12 shooting in a win over Rain or Shine. In a matchup against GlobalPort's rookie scorer Terrence Romeo, he exchanged baskets with Romeo in the clutch and outscored Romeo's 27 points with his own 29 (with 14 in the fourth quarter), giving Ginebra a 109–104 win. This performance earned him a Player of the Week award. That conference, Ginebra finished with the top seed. In Game 1 of their quarterfinals series against Alaska, he committed a flagrant foul penalty 1 on Calvin Abueva. He was fined P5,000 for his actions. He committed another flagrant foul on Abueva the following game, and was once again fined. Ginebra made it all the way to the semis, where they lost to San Mig in seven games. In a Commissioner's Cup win over GlobalPort, he had 15 points and 14 rebounds. He had another double-double of 14 points and 10 rebounds against TNT, but Ginebra lost. After a loss to Air21 which caused Ginebra to fall to eighth in the standings, he vented his frustrations about his team on Twitter. Ginebra won their next game after his rant. However, after Ginebra failed to make it past the quarterfinals, he ripped into his teammates once again on Twitter.

In a 2014–15 Philippine Cup win over the Blackwater Elite, Caguioa scored 10 of his 18 points in the fourth quarter. He then had 15 points and seven assists in a win over Barako. On November 21, 2014, against Meralco, he became only the 20th player to reach the 9,000 point milestone, but Ginebra lost that game. In a Commissioner's Cup win over SMB, he scored nine of his 17 points in the fourth quarter. He earned his eighth All-Star appearance that season, finishing in the top 10 in votes to become a starter for the North All-Stars team. However, a back injury forced him to back out of playing in the All-Star Game. During a Governors' Cup win over Rain or Shine, he and Tenorio combined for 38 points. He then hit the go-ahead jumper that gave Ginebra the lead in overtime and eventually the win against GlobalPort. A broken finger on his left finger however, ended his season early.

==== Final years of "Fast and Furious" ====
In 2015, Ginebra hired a new head coach Tim Cone, who had been the coach of Caguioa's rival James Yap. Ginebra also drafted guard Scottie Thompson, which meant he and Helterbrand had to take on mentorship roles. Against the GlobalPort duo of Romeo and Stanley Pringle during the Philippine Cup, he had 22 points, five steals, four boards, and two assists in 35 minutes, while Tenorio added 18 points, six assists, and four boards in 40 minutes. They also limited Romeo and Pringle to just 10 and 13 points respectively, leading to the win. In a Governors' Cup game against Meralco, he and Helterbrand started a 10–1 run in the third quarter that eventually led to a win. That conference, Ginebra won six of its first eight games as they were led by Tenorio, Thompson, Japeth Aguilar, Sol Mercado, and replacement import Justin Brownlee. However, despite his assists and rebounds increasing, his scoring went down. Ginebra then returned to the finals by beating the Beermen in five games, with him and Helterbrand the only ones remaining from the last Ginebra team to win a championship. There, they faced the Bolts. In Game 1, he had 14 points, but the Bolts won the game in overtime. Ginebra bounced back with a win in Game 2. In the fourth quarter of Game 4, he and Helterbrand came off the bench to lead a 16-point comeback win as they combined to score 19 points. Ginebra's title drought ended in Game 6 when Brownlee made a buzzer-beating three-pointer. After they won, he encouraged the 40-year old Helterbrand not to retire just yet.

In the offseason, Caguioa signed a two-year contract to keep playing for Ginebra. Helterbrand also returned on a one-year contract. In a loss to the Phoenix Fuel Masters during the 2016–17 Philippine Cup, he led Ginebra with 15 points. In Game 3 of their semifinal series against the Star Hotshots, he had a crucial eight points off the bench that started a Ginebra 14–2 run that led to Ginebra taking control of the series. Ginebra eventually won the series in seven games to advance to the finals. In the finals, they lost to the Beermen in five games. Throughout the season, he continued to thrive in an off the bench role for Ginebra. In a Commissioner's Cup win over the Mahindra Enforcer, he had 13 points off the bench. Ginebra finished that conference as the first seed, their first time doing so in three years. They got as far as the semis during the playoffs. In a Governors' Cup win over the Kia Picanto, he had 16 points and missed only one of his nine attempts. In Game 1 of their semifinal series against TNT, he scored 13 points fourth quarter points with seven rebounds off the bench, leading to a win. Ginebra returned to the finals against Meralco, where in Game 4, he and Helterbrand tried to shift the team's momentum like what they did last season, but this time Meralco won, tying the series. Still, Ginebra won back-to-back Governors' Cup titles. Several days after they won, Helterbrand retired, officially putting an end to "The Fast and the Furious" era.

==== Later career ====
Caguioa opened the 2017–18 season by making his 700th triple in a win over the Hotshots, becoming only the 18th player to do so. Later into the season, he overtook Freddie Hubalde on the all-time points scored leaderboard. Ginebra made the Commissioner's Cup finals that season. In Game 1, he scored 11 points in 10 minutes as Ginebra took the first win. In Game 3, he had a conference-high 12 points, but Ginebra went down 2–1 in the series. Ginebra was able to overcome the series deficit, and Caguioa got his first Commissioner's Cup title. On October 5, 2018, against NLEX Road Warriors, he scored 16 points to join the PBA's 10,000 points club. He became just the 15th local player to do so.

During the 2019 season, Caguioa missed a game due to an Achilles injury. He then missed several more games due to food poisoning. Despite playing in only three games that season, coaches voted him into the 2019 All-Star Game. In their quarterfinal series against the Hotshots, he scored 12 points in 13 minutes off the bench to send Ginebra to the semis. He then got his first start in a while in the semis against TNT.

After the team won the 2019 Governors' Cup, Caguioa announced that he would play for one more season. However, the 2020 season was delayed and held in a bubble, with no fans watching them in person. When he made his season debut against Meralco, he officially marked his 18th season, giving him the record for most seasons played for one team. That season, he won his first Philippine Cup in 13 years.

For the 2021 season, head coach Tim Cone was hopeful that Caguioa would play one more season. However, Caguioa wasn't able to play in the 2021 Philippine Cup due to family matters. He was set to play in the Governors' Cup, but due to a calf strain days before the conference started, he wasn't able to play. On June 2, 2022, Cone announced that Caguioa had retired quietly.

== PBA career statistics ==
Legend
GP	Games played	MPG	Minutes per game
FG%	Field-goal percentage	3P%	3-point field-goal percentage	FT%	Free-throw percentage
RPG	Rebounds per game	APG	Assists per game	SPG	Steals per game
BPG	Blocks per game	PPG	Points per game	**Bold**	Career high

Led the league

=== Season-by-season averages ===
Year	Team	GP	MPG	FG%	3P%	FT%	RPG	APG	SPG	BPG	PPG
2001	Barangay Ginebra	52	26.1	.467	**.422**	.870	4.9	1.7	1.0	.1	13.8
2002	Barangay Ginebra	30	29.5	.438	.333	.865	4.2	2.3	.6	.0	13.3
2003	Barangay Ginebra	41	35.6	.421	.329	.750	6.0	2.7	1.0	.1	17.3
2004–05	Barangay Ginebra	**78**	37.4	.491	.331	.799	**6.3**	3.1	**1.1**	.1	18.7
2005–06	Barangay Ginebra	48	37.7	.418	.258	.741	5.8	2.5	1.0	**.2**	20.6
2006–07	Barangay Ginebra	30	**38.7**	.425	.329	.738	4.9	**4.4**	.9	**.2**	**24.6**
2007–08	Barangay Ginebra	39	32.1	.486	.304	.648	4.2	2.2	.8	.1	19.8
2009–10	Barangay Ginebra	34	22.7	.428	.225	.785	3.1	1.6	.9	.0	11.9
2010–11	Barangay Ginebra	57	28.7	.418	.310	.759	5.3	2.4	.7	.0	16.0
2011–12	Barangay Ginebra	41	30.6	.397	.330	.760	4.8	2.3	.8	.1	16.3
2012–13	Barangay Ginebra	41	32.1	.402	.283	.728	4.5	2.6	.7	.0	17.2
2013–14	Barangay Ginebra	43	26.7	.416	.360	.806	4.1	2.0	.3	**.2**	10.6
2014–15	Barangay Ginebra	33	25.8	.411	.217	.863	3.8	1.9	.6	.1	9.8
2015–16	Barangay Ginebra	49	21.9	.392	.102	.800	3.3	1.8	.6	.1	7.0
2016–17	Barangay Ginebra	59	10.7	.418	.083	**.949**	2.5	.7	.2	.1	4.4
2017–18	Barangay Ginebra	43	9.6	.428	.167	.579	2.3	.4	.2	.1	3.6
2019	Barangay Ginebra	23	7.6	.433	.333	.733	1.3	.5	.2	.0	2.8
2020	Barangay Ginebra	3	6.4	**.667**	—	—	2.3	.7	.0	.0	1.3
Career		744	27.1	.434	.307	.765	4.4	2.1	.7	.1	13.5

== National team career ==
In 2005, Caguioa was named in the RP Training Pool. He participated in several exhibition games against the Iranian National Team and the NBL's Sydney Kings in mid-2005, where he impressed the latter team's coach by scoring 27 points. He has also played in the 2005 FIBA Asia Champions Cup held in the Philippines, in which his team finished fifth, the Philippines' highest finish since 1997. He averaged 19.8 points and 3.4 rebounds per game in that tournament.

In 2007, he joined the national team that won the SEABA Championship with a perfect record, won bronze in the William Jones Cup and finished ninth place with a record of 5–2 in the 2007 FIBA Asia Championship. He suffered a shoulder injury during the FIBA tournament, which delayed his return to Ginebra.

Caguioa was considered for the RP team in the 2009 FIBA Asia Championship, but an injury prevented him from joining the team. He was also considered for the 2013 FIBA Asia Championship, but due to San Miguel Corporation's strict policy of only loaning one player to the national team, LA Tenorio was chosen to represent Ginebra.

== Legacy ==
As a nine-time PBA Champion, one-time MVP of the league in 2012, a 13-time All-Star, three-time scoring champion, and a member of the 10,000-point club, Caguioa is one of the most accomplished players in the PBA. He played for Ginebra for 18 years, the most seasons played for just one team. In 2014, he was named to the set of players known as the "40 Greatest Players in PBA History".

Several PBA players such as Chris Newsome and Terrence Romeo have cited Caguioa as their inspiration to become PBA players. Players such as Romeo and Kiefer Ravena have been compared to him when they entered the league.

== Personal life ==
Caguioa is the eldest of three children. He is also related to Chino Trinidad, the former Philippine Basketball League (PBL) commissioner.

When he was a PBA rookie, Caguioa and his Thai girlfriend (who was born in the US) were in a long-distance relationship together. He then was in a relationship with Filipino actress Juliana Palermo. They broke up in 2004. He then started a relationship with Lauren Hudson, a Filipino-Australian print ad model. In 2016, 12 years later, he proposed to her right after he had just won the 2016 Governors' Cup.

Caguioa is a sneakerhead. He started collecting sneakers when he was signed by Reebok. Aside from Reebok, both he and Helterbrand were also signed by Accel, a Filipino sports company, and had signature shoes. In 2019, he, Tenorio and Scottie Thompson competed together on the CNN Philippines show "Off-Court Battle".
