= 2006 PBA Philippine Cup finals =

Team	Coach	Wins
Purefoods Chunkee Giants	Ryan Gregorio	4
Red Bull Barako	Yeng Guiao	2
- Dates: July 5–21
- MVP: Marc Pingris
- Television: ABC
- Radio network: Radyo PBA

PBA Philippine Cup finals chronology
- < 2004–05 2006–07 >

PBA finals chronology
- < 2005–06 Fiesta 2006–07 >

The 2006 PBA Philippine Cup finals were the championship series of the 2005-06 PBA season's 2006 PBA Philippine Cup of the Philippine Basketball Association (PBA). The series was a best-of-seven affair and was the 91st championship disputed in the league. The teams competing are the first-seeded Purefoods Chunkee Giants and the third-seeded Red Bull Barako in a rematch of the finals of the previous conference.

== Qualification ==
- Purefoods Chunkee Giants
  - The top seed qualified for the best-of-seven semifinals outright.
  - Came back from a 1–3 series deficit against the Alaska Aces and won the semifinal series, four games to three.
- Red Bull Barako
  - Finished third after the elimination round.
  - Defeated Barangay Ginebra Kings in the quarterfinal series, 3–2
  - Won semifinals against San Miguel Beermen, 4-3

== Rosters ==
Purefoods Chunkee Giants roster
Players

Pos.	#	POB	Name	Height	Weight	DOB (YYYY–MM–DD)	From
G	3	(Philippines)	Egay Billones	5 ft 9 in (1.75 m)			Centro Escolar Las Piñas
G	4	(Philippines)	Paul Artadi	5 ft 9 in (1.75 m)			UE
F/C	5	(Philippines)	Jondan Salvador	6 ft 4 in (1.93 m)			St. Benilde
F	7	(Philippines)	Rey Evangelista	6 ft 3 in (1.91 m)			UST
G	8	(Philippines)	Peter June Simon	6 ft 1 in (1.85 m)			Mindanao
F/C	9	(Philippines)	Jun Limpot	6 ft 5 in (1.96 m)			De La Salle
F	12	(Philippines)	Don Camaso	6 ft 6 in (1.98 m)			Metro Manila Colleges
G	13	(Philippines)	Roger Yap	6 ft 1 in (1.85 m)			USJ–R
F	15	(Philippines)	Marc Pingris	6 ft 4 in (1.93 m)			PSBA
G/F	18	(Philippines)	James Yap	6 ft 3 in (1.91 m)			UE
C	21	(Philippines)	Kerby Raymundo	6 ft 6 in (1.98 m)			Letran
F	28	(Philippines)	Richard Yee	6 ft 4 in (1.93 m)			UST
F	33	(United States)	Eugene Tejada	6 ft 5 in (1.96 m)			Chabot
F/C	34	(Philippines)	Arnold Gamboa	6 ft 6 in (1.98 m)			Far Eastern
G	40	(United States)	Noy Castillo	6 ft 0 in (1.83 m)			The Citadel

Coaches

Head coach

- (Philippines) Ryan Gregorio

Assistant coach(es)

- (Philippines) Ronnie Magsanoc

Legend

- (C) Team captain
- Injured

Red Bull Barako roster
Players

Pos.	#	POB	Name	Height	Weight	DOB (YYYY–MM–DD)	From
G	1	(Philippines)	Celino Cruz	5 ft 9 in (1.75 m)			Far Eastern
G	4	(Philippines)	Warren Ybañez	5 ft 8 in (1.73 m)			PSBA
PG	5	(Philippines)	Topex Robinson	5 ft 8 in (1.73 m)			San Sebastian
F/C	7	(Australia)	Mick Pennisi	6 ft 9 in (2.06 m)			Eastern Michigan
G/F	8	(Philippines)	Cyrus Baguio	6 ft 2 in (1.88 m)			UST
F	10	(Philippines)	Junthy Valenzuela	6 ft 2 in (1.88 m)			SCSIT
F	11	(Philippines)	Rich Alvarez	6 ft 4 in (1.93 m)			Ateneo
G	12	(Philippines)	Larry Fonacier	6 ft 2 in (1.88 m)			Ateneo
F/C	14	(Philippines)	Enrico Villanueva	6 ft 5 in (1.96 m)			Ateneo
F	15	(Philippines)	Lordy Tugade	6 ft 3 in (1.91 m)			National-U
F	20	(Philippines)	Leo Najorda	6 ft 3 in (1.91 m)			San Sebastian
F/C	21	(Philippines)	Paolo Bugia	6 ft 6 in (1.98 m)			Ateneo
C	35	(Philippines)	Edward Joseph Feihl	7 ft 1 in (2.16 m)			Adamson
F		(United States)	Mike Hrabak	6 ft 6 in (1.98 m)			Central Arizona

Coaches

Head coach

- (Philippines) Yeng Guiao

Assistant coach(es)

- (Philippines) Roehl Nadurata
- (Philippines) Gee Abanilla
- (Philippines) Andy Jao

Legend

- (C) Team captain
- Injured

== Series scoring summary ==
The following scoring summary is written in a line score format, except that the quarter numbers are replaced by game numbers.

Team	Game 1	Game 2	Game 3	Game 4	Game 5	Game 6	Wins
Purefoods	101	93	79	99	93	90	4
Red Bull	97	82	89	81	98	83	2

† denotes the number of overtimes

== Games summary ==
ABC

July 5

Purefoods Chunkee Giants 101, Red Bull Barako 97
Pts: Kerby Raymundo 30 James Yap 26	Pts: Lordy Tugade 30 Enrico Villanueva 25

Araneta Coliseum, Quezon City

Kerby Raymundo scored a career-high 30 points, while Yee added 12 points, including five crucial free throws, in the last two minutes. Purefoods pummeled Red Bull with a 60.9 percent field-goal shooting in the second quarter, and the Giants, nursing a 23–22 edge at the end of the opening period, zoomed to a 53–34 spread at halftime. The Bulls had a fiery chase in the third quarter. They were ahead 97–94 but went scoreless in the last 1:55 of play. Yee canned in two charities off a foul by Villanueva to tie the count at 97-all, and then Raymundo scored on a 15-foot jumper as the Giants surged ahead, 99-97, with time down to 30.9 seconds.

ABC

July 7

Purefoods Chunkee Giants 93, Red Bull Barako 82
Scoring by quarter: 24–13, 15–35, 28–14, 26–20
Pts: James Yap 23	Pts: Lordy Tugade 18

Cuneta Astrodome, Pasay

The Giants were off to a great start in the first quarter by taking a 12-point lead. Red Bull bounced back behind Lordy Tugade and the rest of the team to take a 48-39 halftime lead. Richard Yee put in another sterling performance by banging all of his 17 points in the second half, while Marc Pingris pumped in a career-high 21 points, most of them in the shaded area, to help the Giants pull away.

ABC

July 9

Purefoods Chunkee Giants 79, Red Bull Barako 89
Scoring by quarter: 13–16, 16–18, 23–32, 27–23
Pts: James Yap 16	Pts: Lordy Tugade 22

Araneta Coliseum, Quezon City

Celino Cruz and Lordy Tugade fired all of Red Bull's seven three-pointers, most of them done in a fashion that riled the Giants while putting up a tough and gritty defense. Enrico Villanueva, Junthy Valenzuela, and Cyrus Baguio also had their sparkling moments that helped the Bulls pull away in the third period.

ABC

July 12

Purefoods Chunkee Giants 99, Red Bull Barako 81
Scoring by quarter: 32–11, 34–23, 16–29, 17–18
Pts: James Yap 23	Pts: Enrico Villanueva 25

Araneta Coliseum, Quezon City

Purefoods started hot from the get-go, with key games from newly crowned MVP James Yap and Most Improved Player Marc Pingris. The Giants led by as many as 34 points, and the Bulls never looked back.

ABC

July 19

Purefoods Chunkee Giants 93, Red Bull Barako 98

Araneta Coliseum, Quezon City

The Bulls came back from 15 points down. After Celino Cruz tied the count at 90-all with a triple and Enrico Villanueva and Larry Fonacier went to work, the Giants suddenly got cold feet. Season MVP James Yap muffed his last seven attempts from three-point range, while Kerby Raymundo missed a couple of point-blank attempts.

ABC

July 21

Purefoods Chunkee Giants 90, Red Bull Barako 83
Purefoods wins series, 4–2

Araneta Coliseum, Quezon City

2006 Philippine Cup Champions

Purefoods Chunkee Giants
Seventh title
