= 2004 PBA Fiesta Conference =

Philippine basketball tournament

- Duration: February 22 – July 7, 2004
- TV partner(s): ABC

Finals
- Champions: Barangay Ginebra Kings
- Runners-up: Red Bull Barako

Awards
- Best Player: Eric Menk (Barangay Ginebra Kings)
- Best Import: Victor Thomas (Red Bull Barako)
- Finals MVP: Eric Menk (Barangay Ginebra Kings)

PBA Fiesta Conference chronology
- 2005 >

PBA conference chronology
- < 2003 Reinforced 2004–05 Philippine >

The 2004 PBA Fiesta Conference, or known as the 2004 Gran Matador Brandy-PBA Fiesta Conference for sponsorship reasons, was tournament held by the Philippine Basketball Association and the first ever edition of the PBA Fiesta Conference.

Prior to the formation of the said conference, the league had two import-laced conferences known as the PBA Commissioner's Cup (with an import height-limit of 6–8), and the PBA Governor's Cup (with an import height-limit of 6–4). However, in 2003, the two conferences were scrapped and was replaced with an Invitational tournament, with an All-Filipino local squad along with foreign teams) and an import-laced Reinforced Conference.

But, in 2004, the league changed its calendar from a calendar year to a fiscal year. As a preparation for the new format, the tournament was institutionalized in 2004 as a transitional tournament. The first Fiesta Conference was played from February–July 2004.

== Opening ceremonies ==
The muses for the participating teams are as follows:

Team	Muse
Alaska Aces	Iya Villania
Barangay Ginebra Kings	Belinda Bright and Maricar de Mesa
Coca-Cola Tigers	Iza Calzado
FedEx Express	Katarina Perez
Purefoods TJ Hotdogs	Jennylyn Mercado
Red Bull Barako	
San Miguel Beermen	Jenny Manuel
Shell Turbo Chargers	Michelle Estevez
Sta. Lucia Realtors	
Talk 'N Text Phone Pals	Nancy Castiglione

== 2004 PBA All-Star game ==
The league held its All-Star Weekend on August 15, 2004, at the jampacked New Cebu City Coliseum, with the revived North vs South All-Stars format. The South All-Stars defeated the Northern selection, 130–128, in a closely fought contest. Asi Taulava and Jimmy Alapag were named co-MVP of the All-Star game.

== Classification round ==
Pos	Team	W	L	PCT	GB	Qualification
1	San Miguel Beermen	16	2	.889	—	Advance to quarterfinal round
2	Alaska Aces	11	7	.611 (Note: Head-to-head differential: Alaska +41, Coca-Cola −14, Talk 'N Text −27)	5	Advance to quarterfinal round
3	Coca-Cola Tigers	11	7	.611	5	Advance to wildcard phase
4	Talk 'N Text Phone Pals	11	7	.611	5	Advance to wildcard phase
5	Red Bull Barako	10	8	.556	6	Advance to wildcard phase
6	Sta. Lucia Realtors	8	10	.444	8	Advance to wildcard phase
7	Barangay Ginebra Kings	7	11	.389 (Note: Head-to-head differential: Barangay Ginebra +5, Shell −5)	9	Advance to wildcard phase
8	Shell Turbo Chargers	7	11	.389	9	Advance to wildcard phase
9	FedEx Express	5	13	.278	11	Advance to wildcard phase
10	Purefoods TJ Hotdogs	4	14	.222	12	Advance to wildcard phase

Source: PBA.ph

== Wildcard phase ==
ABC

June 5

Purefoods TJ Hotdogs 92, Coca-Cola Tigers 94

PhilSports Arena, Pasig

ABC

June 5

Talk 'N Text Phone Pals 105, FedEx Express 103

PhilSports Arena, Pasig

ABC

June 6

Shell Turbo Chargers 82, Red Bull Barako 83

Araneta Coliseum, Quezon City

ABC

June 6

Sta. Lucia Realtors 105, Barangay Ginebra Kings 108

Araneta Coliseum, Quezon City

== Quarterfinal round ==
=== Groups ===
Group A	Group B
#1 seeded team	#2 seeded team
Winner of #4 vs #9 wildcard playoff	Winner of #3 vs #10 wildcard playoff
Winner of #5 vs #8 wildcard playoff	Winner of #6 vs #7 wildcard playoff
U.S. Pro-Am Selection	UBC Thunderbirds

=== Group A ===
Pos	Team	W	L	PCT	GB	Qualification
1	Talk 'N Text Tropang Texters	3	0	1.000	—	Semifinals
2	Red Bull Thunder	2	1	.667	1	Semifinals
3	San Miguel Beermen	1	2	.333	2	
4	U.S. Pro-Am Selection (G)	0	3	.000	3	

Source: PBA.ph
(G) Guests

ABC

June 9

Red Bull Barako 96, San Miguel Beermen 89

Araneta Coliseum, Quezon City

ABC

June 12

San Miguel Beermen 92, Talk 'N Text Phone Pals 104

Araneta Coliseum, Quezon City

ABC

June 13

U.S. Pro-Am Selection 91, Red Bull Barako 101

Araneta Coliseum, Quezon City

ABC

June 16

Talk 'N Text Phone Pals 127, U.S. Pro-Am Selection 115

Araneta Coliseum, Quezon City

ABC

June 19

recap

Red Bull Barako 115, Talk 'N Text Phone Pals 119

Araneta Coliseum, Quezon City

ABC

June 20

U.S. Pro-Am Selection 104, San Miguel Beermen 106

Araneta Coliseum, Quezon City

=== Group B ===
Pos	Team	W	L	PCT	GB	Qualification
1	Coca-Cola Tigers	3	0	1.000	—	Semifinals
2	Barangay Ginebra Kings	2	1	.667	1	Semifinals
3	Alaska Aces	1	2	.333	2	
4	UBC Thunderbirds (G)	0	3	.000	3	

Source: PBA.ph
(G) Guests

ABC

June 9

Barangay Ginebra Kings 80, Alaska Aces 73

Araneta Coliseum, Quezon City

ABC

June 12

Alaska Aces 76, Coca-Cola Tigers 92

Araneta Coliseum, Quezon City

ABC

June 13

UBC Thunderbirds 79, Barangay Ginebra Kings 110

Araneta Coliseum, Quezon City

ABC

June 16

recap

Coca-Cola Tigers 110, UBC Thunderbirds 95

Araneta Coliseum, Quezon City

ABC

June 19

Barangay Ginebra Kings 90, Coca-Cola Tigers 91

Araneta Coliseum, Quezon City

ABC

June 20

recap

UBC Thunderbirds 70, Alaska Aces 90

Araneta Coliseum, Quezon City

Two guest teams participated in the tournament, the University of British Columbia men's basketball team and the US Pro-Am Selection. Both never won a single game in the quarterfinals of the tournament.

== Bracket ==
Semifinals (original seed) (best-of-3)
A1	Talk 'N Text (4)	1
B2	Barangay Ginebra (7)	2
B1	Coca-Cola (3)	1
A2	Red Bull (5)	2

Finals (best-of-5)
A2	Barangay Ginebra (7)	3
B2	Red Bull (5)	1
Third-place playoff
A1	Talk 'N Text (4)	113
B1	Coca-Cola (3)	104

== Semifinals ==
=== (A1) Talk 'N Text vs. (B2) Barangay Ginebra ===
ABC

June 23

Talk 'N Text Phone Pals 95, Barangay Ginebra Kings 100

Araneta Coliseum, Quezon City

ABC

June 25

recap

Barangay Ginebra Kings 106, Talk 'N Text Phone Pals 116

PhilSports Arena, Pasig

ABC

June 27

Talk 'N Text Phone Pals 103, Barangay Ginebra Kings 111
Barangay Ginebra wins series, 2–1

Araneta Coliseum, Quezon City

=== (B1) Coca-Cola vs. (A2) Red Bull ===
ABC

June 23

recap

Coca-Cola Tigers 91, Red Bull Barako 87

Araneta Coliseum, Quezon City

ABC

June 25

Red Bull Barako 95, Coca-Cola Tigers 88

PhilSports Arena, Pasig

ABC

June 27

Coca-Cola Tigers 91, Red Bull Barako 101
Red Bull wins series, 2–1

Araneta Coliseum, Quezon City

== Third place playoff ==
ABC

June 30

Coca-Cola Tigers 104, Talk 'N Text Phone Pals 113

Araneta Coliseum, Quezon City

== Finals ==
2004 PBA Fiesta Conference finals
Team	Coach	Wins
Barangay Ginebra Kings	Siot Tanquingcen	3
Red Bull Barako	Yeng Guiao	1
- Dates: June 30–July 7, 2004
- MVP: Eric Menk
- Television: ABC
- Announcers: See broadcast notes

PBA Fiesta Conference finals chronology
- 2005 >

PBA finals chronology
- < 2003 Reinforced 2004–05 Philippine >

The 2004 Philippine Basketball Association (PBA) Fiesta Conference finals was the best-of-5 basketball championship series of the 2004 PBA Fiesta Conference, and the conclusion of the conference's playoffs. Barangay Ginebra Kings and Red Bull Barako played for the 87th championship contested by the league.

The Barangay Ginebra won their 5th league championship with a 3–1 series victory over Red Bull. This is their first championship since 1997 Commissioner's.

=== Scores ===
ABC

June 30

Barangay Ginebra Kings 94, Red Bull Barako 92

Araneta Coliseum, Quezon City

ABC

July 2

Red Bull Barako 107, Barangay Ginebra Kings 103

Araneta Coliseum, Quezon City

ABC

July 4

Barangay Ginebra Kings 94, Red Bull Barako 84

Araneta Coliseum, Quezon City

ABC

July 7

Red Bull Barako 86, Barangay Ginebra Kings 103
Barangay Ginebra wins series, 3–1

Araneta Coliseum, Quezon City
Attendance: 16,468

Ginebra became the lowest seed (7th seed) ever to win a PBA championship, to be followed by the San Miguel Beermen in the 2019 PBA Commissioner's Cup.

=== Broadcast notes ===
Game	Play-by-play	Analyst
Game 1	Ed Picson	Norman Black
Game 2		
Game 3	Ed Picson	Quinito Henson
Game 4	Mico Halili	TJ Manotoc

== Awards ==
Eric Menk of Barangay Ginebra was named the Best Player of the Conference while Red Bull's Victor Thomas is the conference Best Import.

Preceded by 2003 PBA season	PBA seasons Transitional conference	Succeeded by 2004-05 PBA season
Preceded by 2003 PBA Reinforced Conference	PBA conferences 2004	Succeeded by 2004-05 PBA Philippine Cup
