= 2004–05 PBA Philippine Cup =

Basketball cup finals

- Duration: October 3, 2004 – February 11, 2005
- TV partner(s): ABC (Local); The Filipino Channel (International)

Finals
- Champions: Barangay Ginebra Kings
- Runners-up: Talk 'N Text Phone Pals

Awards
- Best Player: Eric Menk (Barangay Ginebra Kings)
- Finals MVP: Eric Menk (Barangay Ginebra Kings)

PBA Philippine Cup chronology
- < 2003 2006 >

PBA conference chronology
- < 2004 Fiesta 2005 Fiesta >

The 2004–05 PBA Philippine Cup, or known as the 2004–05 Gran Matador Brandy-PBA Philippine Cup for sponsorship reasons, was the All-Filipino Conference of the Philippine Basketball Association's (PBA) 2004–05 season.

The Barangay Ginebra Kings won its first back-to-back titles with a 4–2 conquest of the Talk 'N Text Phone Pals. The series was marred by a controversial reversal of the Phone Pals' Game One victory after fielding in an ineligible Asi Taulava in the said game. Taulava was serving an indefinite suspension after being cited as one of six Filipino-American players with questionable citizenship papers.

Eric Menk won another Best Player of the Conference Award, his third in his PBA career.

== Classification round ==
=== Team standings ===
Pos	Team	W	L	PCT	GB	Qualification
1	Barangay Ginebra Kings	13	5	.722	—	Advance to semifinals
2	Talk 'N Text Phone Pals	12	6	.667 (Note: Second-seed playoff: Talk 'N Text 85–79 Shell)	1	Advance to semifinals
3	Shell Turbo Chargers	12	6	.667	1	Twice-to-beat in the wildcard phase
4	Alaska Aces	9	9	.500 (Note: Head-to-head differential: Alaska +16, San Miguel +11, Purefoods −27; fourth-seed playoff: Alaska 98–91 San Miguel)	4	Twice-to-beat in the wildcard phase
5	San Miguel Beermen	9	9	.500	4	Best-of-three wildcard phase
6	Purefoods TJ Hotdogs	9	9	.500	4	Best-of-three wildcard phase
7	Coca-Cola Tigers	8	10	.444	5	Best-of-three wildcard phase
8	Sta. Lucia Realtors	6	12	.333 (Note: Head-to-head differential: Sta. Lucia +15, FedEx +4, Red Bull −19)	7	Best-of-three wildcard phase
9	FedEx Express	6	12	.333	7	Twice-to-win in the wildcard phase
10	Red Bull Thunder	6	12	.333	7	Twice-to-win in the wildcard phase

Source: PBA.ph

== Second seed playoff ==
ABC

January 7

Shell Turbo Chargers 79, Talk 'N Text Phone Pals 85

Araneta Coliseum, Quezon City

== Fourth seed playoff ==
ABC

January 7

recap

Alaska Aces 98, San Miguel Beermen 91

Araneta Coliseum, Quezon City

== Bracket ==
Wildcard phase
(#4 twice-to-beat)
4	Alaska	96
9	FedEx	93
(Best-of-3)
5	San Miguel	2
8	Sta. Lucia	0
(#3 twice-to-beat)
3	Shell	98
10	Red Bull	77
(Best-of-3)
6	Purefoods	2
7	Coca-Cola	1

Quarterfinals (Best-of-3)
4	Alaska	0
5	San Miguel	2
3	Shell	2
6	Purefoods	1

Semifinals (Best-of-5)
1	Barangay Ginebra	3
5	San Miguel	2
2	Talk 'N Text	3
3	Shell	0

Finals (Best-of-7)
1	Barangay Ginebra	4
2	Talk 'N Text	2
Third-place playoff
5	San Miguel	105
3	Shell	100

== Wildcard phase ==
The #3 vs. #10 and the #4 vs. #9 matchups are in the "twice-to-beat" format; the team with the higher seed only needs to win once to advance, but needs to be beaten twice in order to be eliminated. The other two matchups are a best-of-three series.

=== (3) Shell vs. (10) Red Bull ===
ABC

January 11

recap

Shell Turbo Chargers 98, Red Bull Barako 77
Shell wins series in one game

Cuneta Astrodome, Pasay

=== (4) Alaska vs. (9) FedEx ===
ABC

January 11

Alaska Aces 96, FedEx Express 93
Alaska wins series in one game

Cuneta Astrodome, Pasay

=== (5) San Miguel vs. (8) Sta. Lucia ===
ABC

January 9

recap

San Miguel Beermen 98, Sta. Lucia Realtors 84

Araneta Coliseum, Quezon City

ABC

January 12

recap

San Miguel Beermen 81, Sta. Lucia Realtors 77
San Miguel wins series, 2–0

Cuneta Astrodome, Pasay

=== (6) Purefoods vs. (7) Coca-Cola ===
ABC

January 9

Purefoods TJ Hotdogs 91, Coca-Cola Tigers 85

Araneta Coliseum, Quezon City

ABC

January 12

Purefoods TJ Hotdogs 74, Coca-Cola Tigers 81

Cuneta Astrodome, Pasay

ABC

January 13

Purefoods TJ Hotdogs 74, Coca-Cola Tigers 71
Purefoods wins series, 2–1

PhilSports Arena, Pasig

== Quarterfinals ==
=== (3) Shell vs. (6) Purefoods ===
ABC

January 14

Shell Turbo Chargers 71, Purefoods TJ Hotdogs 69

Cuneta Astrodome, Pasay

ABC

January 16

Shell Turbo Chargers 77, Purefoods TJ Hotdogs 90

Araneta Coliseum, Quezon City

ABC

January 18

recap

Shell Turbo Chargers 106, Purefoods TJ Hotdogs 95
Shell wins series, 2–1

Cuneta Astrodome, Pasay

=== (4) Alaska vs. (5) San Miguel ===
ABC

January 14

Alaska Aces 87, San Miguel Beermen 91

Cuneta Astrodome, Pasay

ABC

January 16

recap

Alaska Aces 86, San Miguel Beermen 97
San Miguel wins series, 2–0

Araneta Coliseum, Quezon City

== Semifinals ==
=== (1) Barangay Ginebra vs. (5) San Miguel ===
ABC

January 19

recap

Barangay Ginebra Kings 87, San Miguel Beermen 96

Araneta Coliseum, Quezon City

ABC

January 21

Barangay Ginebra Kings 100, San Miguel Beermen 92

Araneta Coliseum, Quezon City

ABC

January 23

Barangay Ginebra Kings 91, San Miguel Beermen 96

Araneta Coliseum, Quezon City

ABC

January 26

recap

Barangay Ginebra Kings 94, San Miguel Beermen 92

Araneta Coliseum, Quezon City

ABC

January 28

Barangay Ginebra Kings 76, San Miguel Beermen 71
Barangay Ginebra wins series, 3–2

Araneta Coliseum, Quezon City

=== (2) Talk 'N Text vs. (3) Shell ===
ABC

January 19

Talk 'N Text Phone Pals 101, Shell Turbo Chargers 89

Araneta Coliseum, Quezon City

ABC

January 21

recap

Talk 'N Text Phone Pals 92, Shell Turbo Chargers 84 (OT)

Araneta Coliseum, Quezon City

ABC

January 23

recap

Talk 'N Text Phone Pals 102, Shell Turbo Chargers 96
Talk 'N Text wins series, 3–0

Araneta Coliseum, Quezon City

== Third place playoff ==
ABC

January 30

Shell Turbo Chargers 100, San Miguel Beermen 105

Araneta Coliseum, Quezon City

== Finals ==
ABC

January 30

~~Barangay Ginebra Kings 71, Talk 'N Text Phone Pals 89~~

Araneta Coliseum, Quezon City

PBA commissioner Noli Eala forfeits Game 1, 71–89 in favor of Barangay Ginebra since Asi Taulava, who was still suspended by the league, participated in the game.

ABC

February 2

Barangay Ginebra Kings 106, Talk 'N Text Phone Pals 105

Araneta Coliseum, Quezon City

ABC

February 4

Barangay Ginebra Kings 66, Talk 'N Text Phone Pals 102

Araneta Coliseum, Quezon City

ABC

February 6

Barangay Ginebra Kings 85, Talk 'N Text Phone Pals 90

Araneta Coliseum, Quezon City

ABC

February 9

Barangay Ginebra Kings 95, Talk 'N Text Phone Pals 85 (2OT)

Araneta Coliseum, Quezon City

ABC

February 11

Barangay Ginebra Kings 96, Talk 'N Text Phone Pals 86
Barangay Ginebra wins series, 4–2

Araneta Coliseum, Quezon City
