= PBA Finals Most Valuable Player =

The PBA Finals Most Valuable Player is a Philippine Basketball Association (PBA) award given to the best performing player of a conference finals series as voted by the PBA Press Corps. Usually, the award is given to a player from the conference champion team and is always given at the end of the finals series. The award can only be given to Filipino or Filipino-foreigner players, and not the team's import.

The award was first given out after the 1996 All-Filipino Cup finals. Beginning with the 2025–26 Philippine Cup finals, recipients were given the Ramon Fernandez Trophy, named after 19-time PBA champion Ramon Fernandez.

June Mar Fajardo has the most Finals MVPs with five. Danny Seigle, Brandon Cablay, and Mikey Williams are the only rookies to win the award, with Williams winning it in his first conference. In 2024, Jayson Castro became the oldest to win the award. On rare occasion, two players from the same team shared the award in a single conference, with the most recent duo to accomplish this feat being Jimmy Alapag and Castro during the 2011 Commissioner's Cup finals.

== Winners ==
^	Denotes player who is still active in the PBA
*	Inducted into the PBA Hall of Fame
Player (X)	Denotes the number of times the player had received the Finals MVP award
Team (X)	Denotes the number of times a player from this team has received the Finals MVP award

Season	Conference finals	Player	Team	Ref.
1996	All-Filipino	Jojo Lastimosa	Alaska Milkmen	
1996	Commissioner's	Bong Hawkins	Alaska Milkmen (2)	
1996	Governors'	Johnny Abarrientos	Alaska Milkmen (3)	
1997	All-Filipino	Alvin Patrimonio*	Purefoods Corned Beef Cowboys	
1997	Commissioner's	Marlou Aquino	Gordon's Gin Boars	
1997	Governors'	Johnny Abarrientos (2)	Alaska Milkmen (4)	
1998	All-Filipino	Kenneth Duremdes	Alaska Milkmen (5)	
1998	Commissioner's	Kenneth Duremdes (2)	Alaska Milkmen (6)	
1998	Governors'	Benjie Paras*	Formula Shell Zoom Masters	
1999	All-Filipino	Gerry Esplana	Formula Shell Zoom Masters (2)	
1999	Commissioner's	Danny Seigle	San Miguel Beermen	
1999	Governors'	Danny Seigle (2)	San Miguel Beermen (2)	
1999	Governors'	Danny Ildefonso	San Miguel Beermen (2)	
2000	All-Filipino	Poch Juinio	Alaska Milkmen (7)	
2000	Commissioner's	Danny Ildefonso (2)	San Miguel Beermen (3)	
2000	Governors'	Danny Seigle (3)	San Miguel Beermen (4)	
2001	All-Filipino	Danny Seigle (4)	San Miguel Beermen (5)	
2001	Commissioner's	Davonn Harp	Red Bull Thunder	
2001	Governors'	Gerard Francisco	Sta. Lucia Realtors	
2002	Governors'	Kerby Raymundo	Purefoods TJ Hotdogs (2)	
2002	Commissioner's	Willie Miller	Red Bull Thunder (2)	
2002	All-Filipino	Rudy Hatfield	Coca-Cola Tigers	
2003	All-Filipino	Asi Taulava	Talk 'N Text Phone Pals	
2003	Invitational	Brandon Cablay	Alaska Aces (8)	
2003	Reinforced	Jeffrey Cariaso	Coca-Cola Tigers (2)	
(2004)	Fiesta	Eric Menk	Barangay Ginebra Kings (2)	
2004–05	Philippine	Eric Menk (2)	Barangay Ginebra Kings (3)	
2004–05	Fiesta	Danny Ildefonso (3)	San Miguel Beermen (6)	
2005–06	Fiesta	Lordy Tugade	Red Bull Barako (3)	
2005–06	Philippine	Marc Pingris	Purefoods Chunkee Giants (3)	
2006–07	Philippine	Jayjay Helterbrand	Barangay Ginebra Kings (4)	
2006–07	Fiesta	Willie Miller (2)	Alaska Aces (9)	
2007–08	Philippine	Dennis Espino	Sta. Lucia Realtors (2)	
2007–08	Fiesta	Eric Menk (3)	Barangay Ginebra Kings (5)	
2007–08	Fiesta	Ronald Tubid	Barangay Ginebra Kings (5)	
2008–09	Philippine	Mark Cardona	Talk 'N Text Tropang Texters (2)	
2008–09	Fiesta	Jonas Villanueva	San Miguel Beermen (7)	
2009–10	Philippine	James Yap	Purefoods Tender Juicy Giants (4)	
2009–10	Fiesta	LA Tenorio^	Alaska Aces (10)	
2009–10	Fiesta	Cyrus Baguio	Alaska Aces (10)	
2010–11	Philippine	Jimmy Alapag	Talk 'N Text Tropang Texters (3)	
2010–11	Philippine	Jayson Castro^	Talk 'N Text Tropang Texters (3)	
2010–11	Commissioner's	Jimmy Alapag (2)	Talk 'N Text Tropang Texters (4)	
2010–11	Commissioner's	Jayson Castro^ (2)	Talk 'N Text Tropang Texters (4)	
2010–11	Governors'	Arwind Santos	Petron Blaze Boosters (8)	
2011–12	Philippine	Larry Fonacier	Talk 'N Text Tropang Texters (5)	
2011–12	Commissioner's	James Yap (2)	B-Meg Llamados (5)	
2011–12	Governors'	Jeff Chan	Rain or Shine Elasto Painters	
2012–13	Philippine	Ranidel de Ocampo	Talk 'N Text Tropang Texters (6)	
2012–13	Commissioner's	Sonny Thoss	Alaska Aces (11)	
2012–13	Governors'	Marc Pingris (2)	San Mig Coffee Mixers (6)	
2013–14	Philippine	Mark Barroca^	San Mig Super Coffee Mixers (7)	
2013–14	Commissioner's	James Yap (3)	San Mig Super Coffee Mixers (8)	
2013–14	Governors'	James Yap (4)	San Mig Super Coffee Mixers (9)	
2014–15	Philippine	Arwind Santos (2)	San Miguel Beermen (9)	
2014–15	Commissioner's	Ranidel de Ocampo (2)	Talk 'N Text Tropang Texters (7)	
2014–15	Governors'	June Mar Fajardo^	San Miguel Beermen (10)	
2015–16	Philippine	Chris Ross^	San Miguel Beermen (11)	
2015–16	Commissioner's	Paul Lee^	Rain or Shine Elasto Painters	
2015–16	Governors'	LA Tenorio^ (2)	Barangay Ginebra San Miguel (6)	
2016–17	Philippine	Chris Ross^ (2)	San Miguel Beermen (12)	
2016–17	Commissioner's	Alex Cabagnot	San Miguel Beermen (13)	
2016–17	Governors'	LA Tenorio^ (3)	Barangay Ginebra San Miguel (7)	
2017–18	Philippine	June Mar Fajardo^ (2)	San Miguel Beermen (14)	
2017–18	Commissioner's	Scottie Thompson^	Barangay Ginebra San Miguel (8)	
2017–18	Governors'	Mark Barroca^ (2)	Magnolia Hotshots Pambansang Manok (10)	
2019	Philippine	June Mar Fajardo^ (3)	San Miguel Beermen (15)	
2019	Commissioner's	Terrence Romeo	San Miguel Beermen (16)	
2019	Governors'	Japeth Aguilar^	Barangay Ginebra San Miguel (9)	
2020	Philippine	LA Tenorio^ (4)	Barangay Ginebra San Miguel (10)	
2021	Philippine	Mikey Williams	TNT Tropang Giga (8)	
2021	Governors'	Scottie Thompson^ (2)	Barangay Ginebra San Miguel (11)	
2022–23	Philippine	June Mar Fajardo^ (4)	San Miguel Beermen (17)	
2022–23	Commissioner's	Christian Standhardinger	Barangay Ginebra San Miguel (12)	
2022–23	Governors'	Mikey Williams (2)	TNT Tropang Giga (9)	
2023–24	Commissioner's	CJ Perez^	San Miguel Beermen (18)	
2023–24	Philippine	Chris Newsome^	Meralco Bolts	
2024–25	Governors'	Jayson Castro^ (3)	TNT Tropang Giga (10)	
2024–25	Commissioner's	Rey Nambatac^	TNT Tropang Giga (11)	
2024–25	Philippine	Jericho Cruz^	San Miguel Beermen (19)	
2025–26	Philippine	June Mar Fajardo^ (5)	San Miguel Beermen (20)	
2025–26	Commissioner's	Scottie Thompson^ (3)	Barangay Ginebra San Miguel (13)	

== Multiple-time winners ==
Total	Player
5	June Mar Fajardo
4	Danny Seigle
4	LA Tenorio
4	James Yap
3	Jayson Castro
3	Danny Ildefonso
3	Eric Menk
3	Scottie Thompson
2	Johnny Abarrientos
2	Jimmy Alapag
2	Mark Barroca
2	Ranidel de Ocampo
2	Kenneth Duremdes
2	Willie Miller
2	Marc Pingris
2	Chris Ross
2	Arwind Santos
2	Mikey Williams
