= Siot Tanquingcen =

Filipino basketball player and coach

NU Bulldogs
- Title: Assistant coach
- League: UAAP

Personal information
- Born: November 3, 1972 (age 54) Manila, Philippines
- Listed height: 5 ft 9 in (1.75 m)
- Listed weight: 165 lb (75 kg)

Career information
- High school: Philippine Cultural High School (Caloocan)
- College: UST
- PBA draft: 1996: Undrafted
- Playing career: 1997–2000
- Position: Point guard

Career history

Playing
- 1996: Sunkist Orange Juicers
- 1997–1998: San Miguel Beermen
- 1999–2000: Pampanga Dragons

Coaching
- 2000–2003: San Miguel Beermen (assistant)
- 2004–2006: Barangay Ginebra Kings
- 2007–2010: San Miguel Beermen
- 2011–2013: Barangay Ginebra Kings / Barangay Ginebra San Miguel
- 2014: Barako Bull Energy
- 2015: San Miguel Beermen (assistant)
- 2015–2018: De La Salle (assistant)
- 2019–2021: CSB (assistant)
- 2022–present: NU (assistant)
- 2024–2025: NLEX Road Warriors (assistant)

Career highlights
- As player: UAAP champion (1993); As head coach: 3× PBA champion (2004 Fiesta, 2004–05 Philippine, 2009 Fiesta); PBA Coach of the Year (2004–05); As assistant coach: 4x PBA champion (2000 Commissioner's, 2000 Governors', 2001 All-Filipino, 2006–07 Philippine); AsiaBasket champion (2024 International)

Bethune "Siot" Tanquingcen is a Filipino professional basketball head coach. He is currently an assistant coach for the NU Bulldogs.

As coach, Tanquingcen has won three PBA championships: two with Barangay Ginebra San Miguel (2004 Fiesta Conference and 2004–2005 Philippine Cup) and one with the San Miguel Beermen (2009 Fiesta Conference).

He was former player for the UST Growling Tigers in the UAAP, the Sunkist Orange Juicers and the San Miguel Beermen in the PBA and the Pampanga Dragons in the Metropolitan Basketball Association. He finished high school at the Philippine Cultural High School.

== Playing career ==
Tanquingcen was one of the role players for the UST Tigers in their historic four-peat run from 1993 to 1996 under head coach Aric del Rosario. Other members of the said squad were Chris Cantonjos, Estong Ballesteros, Rey Evangelista, Dennis Espino, Udoy Belmonte, Del Rosario's son Lester and Bal David.

He also played as the starting point guard for the Philippine team, alongside Poch Juinio that won the gold medal in the 1993 Southeast Asian Games.

He went undrafted in the PBA draft in 1996, but was signed by Sunkist late in the season. He got to play for a total of three games as a practice player. He also played for the San Miguel Beermen from 1997 to 1998 as a 12th man for the team. In 1999, he joined his former UST mentor del Rosario in the MBA's Pampanga Dragons, usually as its starting point guard.

== Coaching career ==
=== San Miguel under Jong Uichico ===
After his stint with the Dragons, Tanquingcen became the assistant coach of the San Miguel Beermen under Jong Uichico. In 2002, Tanquingcen was the team's interim coach with Uichico tasked to lead the Philippine national basketball team in the 2002 Asian Games. Despite a limited lineup of Dorian Peña, Boybits Victoria and imports Lamont Strothers, Art Long, Shea Seals and Terquin Mott, he coached the Beermen to a respectable fourth-place finish in the Governor's Cup and finished third in the Commissioner's Cup.

=== Barangay Ginebra Kings as head coach: 2004–2006 ===
Tanquingcen would return to his assistant duties for the next two seasons. However, midway through the 2004 PBA Fiesta Conference, Barangay Ginebra mentor Allan Caidic was relegated as team manager and hired Tanquincen from its sister team as its new head coach.

The change led to changes in the Ginebra system, as Tanquingcen used more of Jayjay Helterbrand on the point guard spot instead of the inconsistent and injured Bal David. This and other changes led to the Kings' improbable championship in the said conference, defeating Red Bull Barako, 3–1.

In the 2004–05 Philippine Cup, Tanquingcen once again led the crowd-favorites to its first back-to-back title in franchise history after defeating the Talk 'N Text Phone Pals in six games.

=== 2006–07 Philippine Cup: demotion and move to interim coach ===
During the 2006 offseason, Jong Uichico was named as the new head coach of the Barangay Ginebra Kings, after a big overhaul by almost all of the then-four PBA teams of San Miguel Corporation (the Coca-Cola Tigers is now under the Coca-Cola Company). Tanquingcen, however, was demoted as Uichico's assistant, reprising the role he had with the Beermen.

Despite the limited role, Tanquingcen was normally spotted mapping out offensive sets for the Kings during timeouts as Uichico looks on. The Kings would eventually won the Philippine Cup as an assistant defeating sister company, the Beermen after winning the last four games following a 0–2 hole.

=== 2007: San Miguel's coach ===
In the 2007 PBA Fiesta Conference, Tanquingcen was sent back to San Miguel as an interim coach for Chot Reyes, who focused his role as head of the Philippine national basketball team. At the time Tanquingcen was named head coach, San Miguel struggled with a 0–6 record, and eventually posted a 1–7 card.

But, the Beermen began a surprise run in the tournament, that began with an eight-game winning streak, before finishing with a 10–8 record, and a wild-card appearance.

In a wildcard match against the Coca-Cola Tigers for the final quarterfinals berth, San Miguel won a 102–101 miracle score despite trailing by four points with only 13 seconds left.

Their run continued in the quarterfinals, scoring an upset against his former team, Barangay Ginebra, in the best-of-three series before falling to eventual champion Alaska Aces in a grueling six-game tussle. In 2009 PBA Fiesta Conference they defeat the crowd favorite Barangay Ginebra Kings in seven games 90–79 to get his third PBA title as a head coach.

=== 2010: back to Ginebra as assistant ===
SMC made its announcement in August 2010 that Ato Agustin will be the new head coach of the San Miguel Beermen beginning 2010–11 season. Siot Tanquincen has been transferred back to the Barangay Ginebra Kings as assistant to Jong Uichico.

=== 2011/2012: Ginebra as head coach ===
SMC management once again decided to relegate Siot Tanquincen as the head tactician of the Barangay Ginebra Kings together with Jong Uichico. They were both head coaches but Siot having the last call for the team. After one conference Jong Uichico then decided to move to Pangilinan owned Meralco team as a consultant right after being considered to be part of Smart Gilas coaching staff. At the start of the second conference Siot becomes the lone coach of the country's most popular team with Allan Caidic, Marco Januz Sauler and Art dela Cruz as assistants.

=== 2014: Barako Bull Energy ===
Tanquingcen took over the coaching duties of Barako Bull from Bong Ramos after a dismal 2–7 win–loss campaign in the 2014 PBA Commissioner's Cup. In his first conference with Barako during the Governors' Cup, his team barely squeaked in the quarterfinals with 3–6 win–loss record, and was eliminated by Talk 'N Text.

He was fired before the start of the new season due to conflicts with management. He was replaced by Koy Banal.

=== 2015–2018: consulting and assisting in the collegiate ranks ===
Tanquingcen was appointed as one of the assistant coaches of the De La Salle Green Archers since May 2015. in 2018, he relocated to Benilde Blazers, as consultant and assistant coach.

=== 2024–2025: NLEX Road Warriors ===
Tanquingcen comes back to the PBA after he was appointed as one of the assistant coaches of the NLEX Road Warriors starting in the 2024–25 PBA Commissioner's Cup.

== Coaching record ==
=== PBA ===
Season	Conference	Team	G	W	L	PCT	Finish	PG	W	L	PCT	Results
2004–05	Fiesta	Barangay Ginebra	14	4	10	.400	7th	11	8	3	.727	Champions
2004–05	Philippine Cup	Barangay Ginebra	18	13	5	.722	1st	11	7	4	.636	Champions
2004–05	Fiesta	Barangay Ginebra	18	8	10	.444	7th	2	0	2	.000	Wildcard round
2005–06	Fiesta	Barangay Ginebra	16	9	7	.563	2nd	9	4	5	.444	Fourth place
2005–06	Philippine Cup	Barangay Ginebra	16	7	9	.438	7th	8	5	3	.625	Quarterfinals
2006–07	Fiesta	San Miguel/Magnolia	15	10	5	.667	5th	10	4	6	.400	Fourth place
2007–08	Philippine Cup	San Miguel/Magnolia	18	10	8	.556	5th	2	0	2	.000	Quarterfinals
2007–08	Fiesta	San Miguel/Magnolia	18	10	8	.556	5th	10	4	6	.400	Fourth place
2008–09	Philippine Cup	San Miguel/Magnolia	18	9	9	.500	6th	12	6	6	.000	Fourth place
2008–09	Fiesta	San Miguel/Magnolia	14	11	3	.786	1st	13	8	5	.615	Champions
2009–10	Philippine Cup	San Miguel/Magnolia	18	13	5	.722	2nd	7	3	4	.429	Third place
2009–10	Fiesta	San Miguel/Magnolia	17	13	4	.765	2nd	10	5	5	.500	Runner-up
2011–12	Commissioner's Cup	Barangay Ginebra	9	6	3	.667	2nd	4	1	3	.250	Semifinals
2011–12	Governor's Cup	Barangay Ginebra	14	9	5	.643	2nd	6	4	2	.666	Finals berth playoff
2012–13	Philippine Cup	Barangay Ginebra	14	7	7	.500	6th	2	1	2	.333	Quarterfinals
2013–14	Governor's Cup	Barako Bull	9	3	6	.333	8th	1	0	1	.000	Quarterfinals
Career totals			245	142	103	.579	Playoff totals	119	60	59	.504	3 championships

== See also ==
- Barangay Ginebra Kings
- UST Growling Tigers men's basketball
