= Eric Menk =

Filipino-American basketball player

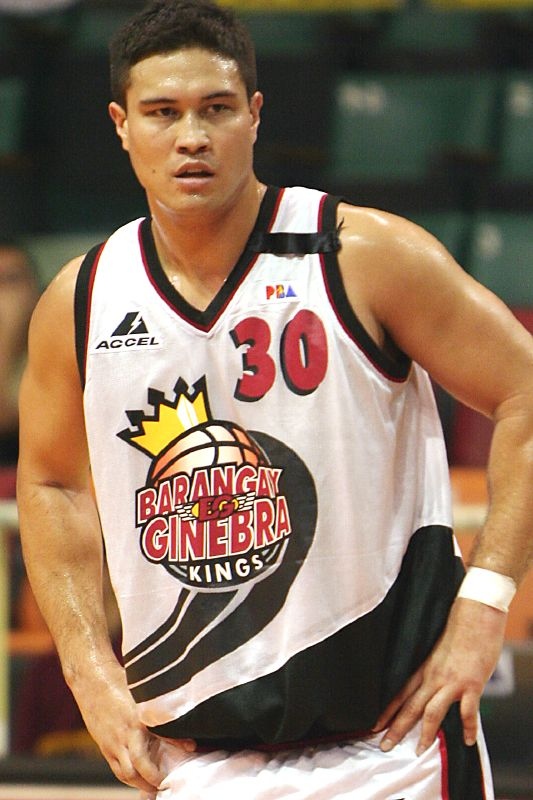
- Menk with the Barangay Ginebra Kings in 2007

Personal information
- Born: August 24, 1974 (age 52) Grand Rapids, Michigan, U.S.
- Listed height: 6 ft 6 in (1.98 m)
- Listed weight: 221 lb (100 kg)

Career information
- High school: Charlotte (Charlotte, Michigan)
- College: Lake Superior State (1992–1996)
- PBA draft: 1999: Elevated
- Drafted by: Tanduay Rhum Masters
- Playing career: 1996–2016
- Position: Center / power forward
- Number: 30
- Coaching career: 2018–2020

Career history

Playing
- 1996–1997: Horsens Idraets Club
- 1999–2001: Tanduay Rhum Masters
- 2001–2012: Barangay Ginebra Kings / Barangay Ginebra San Miguel
- 2013: San Miguel Beermen
- 2013–2014: GlobalPort Batang Pier
- 2014–2016: Alaska Aces

Coaching
- 2018–2020: San Miguel Alab Pilipinas (assistant)

Career highlights
- 4× PBA champion (2004 Fiesta, 2004–05 Philippine, 2006–07 Philippine, 2008 Fiesta); PBA Most Valuable Player (2005); 3× PBA Finals Most Valuable Player (2004 Fiesta, 2004–05 Philippine, 2008 Fiesta); 3× PBA Best Player of the Conference (1999 All-Filipino, 2004 Fiesta, 2004–05 Philippine); 10× PBA All-Star (1999, 2000, 2003–2007, 2009–2011); PBA Mythical First Team (2005); PBA Mythical Second Team (1999); PBA All-Defensive Team (1999); 3× PBA Scoring Champion (1999–2001); 50 Greatest Players in PBA History (2015 selection); ABL champion (2013); 2× PBL champion (1997–98 All-Filipino, 1998–99 Yakult-Centennial); 3x PBL MVP (1997–98 All Filipino, 1998 Yakult Centennial, 1998–99 2nd Yakult Centennial); PBL Rookie of the Year (1997); GLIAC Player of the Year (1996)

Eric Conrad Padua Menk (born August 24, 1974) is a Filipino-American former professional basketball player who played in the Philippine Basketball Association (PBA) and the ASEAN Basketball League. Known as Major Pain, Menk is a four-time PBA champion and was the 2004–05 PBA Most Valuable Player.

Menk had played for the Barangay Ginebra franchise for twelve seasons before being waived and signed by the San Miguel Beermen of the ASEAN Basketball League. He was eventually picked up by the Aces of the PBA, playing for them for two seasons before retiring.

== Early life ==
Menk was born in Grand Rapids; his family moved to Charlotte when he was six. His mother, Lucia Padua, was born in Lawa-an, Eastern Samar and met Al, his father, in Angeles City while he served in the United States Air Force. They got married in 1969. Before him, she had previously given birth to twin boys, but one was stillborn, and the other died within 24 hours. His sister was born a year later. His father began teaching him how to play basketball at the age of seven. When he turned 10, Al started to bring him to high school basketball games. He was often bullied because of his lineage.

== High school and college career ==
Menk attended Charlotte High School in the state of Michigan from 1988 to 1992. In his junior year, he scored 45 points in a win over Battle Creek Lakeview, missing only two shots from the field. As a senior, he was named First Team All-State in Class A by the Associated Press and an Honorable Mention All-American by USA Today and McDonald's. He scored 28 points and grabbed 14 rebounds in a marquee matchup against the #1-ranked high-school player in the country, Chris Webber. In 2018, he was honored as a part of Charlotte's inaugural Hall of Fame class, along with Wayne Terwilliger, Brock Gutierrez, and many other alumni.

Menk decided to attend Lake Superior State University from 1992 to 1996. It was the only school from Michigan that offered him a scholarship. It was also close to his home. There, he was a 3-time All-Great Lakes Intercollegiate Athletic Conference performer and an NCAA Division II All-American. As a senior, he captained a team that won the schools only GLIAC tournament championship. That year, 1996, he was GLIAC Player of the Year and MVP of the GLIAC tournament. He finished his career at LSSU with 1,800 points in 105 games.

== Professional career ==
=== European career ===
Menk played a year in Denmark. He was an import for HIC (Horsens Idraets Club), in the Danish Elite Division in 1996–97, averaging 19 points per game.

=== PBL career ===
After his stint in Denmark, Menk had offers to play in England and Ireland. His Filipino agent, Sam Unera, gave him an offer to play in the Philippines. He arrived in the Philippine basketball scene in 1997 when he played for the Tanduay Rhum Masters in the Philippine Basketball League (PBL). After adjusting to the league's physicality, he quickly made an impact in the PBL being the first Rookie of the Year Awardee and Most Valuable Player Awardee. Aside from that, he also won two more Most Valuable Player Awards and piloted Tanduay to a couple of championships. During his final PBL conference, Menk and Blu Detergent's Asi Taulava was considered one of the best rivalries at the time.

=== PBA career ===
==== Tanduay Rhum Masters ====
After Tanduay made its return to the PBA, the Rhum Masters were allowed to nab six players from their PBL squad. Menk headlined the list of those elevated to the pro ranks. Also, Tanduay drafted Filipino-American Sonny Alvarado as the top pick, making Menk and Alvarado as one of the strongest frontlines in the league.

Menk would struggle in his early games in the PBA. However, Menk made a strong showing in the 1999 All-Filipino Conference, leading Tanduay to a finals appearance in their maiden season. While Menk was named as the Best Player of the Conference, the Rhum Masters were upset by the veteran-laiden Formula Shell Zoom Masters of eventual-MVP Benjie Paras. He scored 43 points in a Game 3 loss during that finals. Menk continued his strong performance in the Commissioner and Governors Cup tournaments, leading him to numerous awards. As a rookie, he also led all locals in scoring for that season.

In 2000, Menk had another strong season for the Rhum Masters, as the team became one of the strongest teams in the league, acquiring Dondon Hontiveros and Jeffrey Cariaso. This included a career-high 45 points in a win over the Sta. Lucia Realtors. The team became a threat to corporate rival San Miguel Beermen. However, disappointment came for the team as Alvarado was deported for falsification of documents. The Rhum Masters, who won Games 2 and 3 of the semifinals series against Purefoods during that year's All-Filipino Cup, were eliminated from the series after its games won with Alvarado on the team were forfeited. Menk's citizenship came in question as well during the Commissioner's Cup, after the league scrutinized most of the Filipino-foreign cagers' documents. Menk was unable to further prove his Filipino lineage and was suspended indefinitely, forcing Menk to end his season early. During this time, he was courted by the Negros Slashers and the Cebu Gems to transfer to the Metropolitan Basketball Association (MBA).

Menk got frustrated not being able to play and considered leaving the country. Tanduay considered bringing him back not as a local, but as an import. His return to the pro league came more than a year later, when he was able to prove his citizenship. He played five games for Tanduay in the 2001 Governor's Cup, as the Rhum Masters bowed out of the tournament early and he suffered a strained calf injury.

==== Barangay Ginebra Kings ====
===== First seasons with Ginebra (2001–2003) =====
After the 2001 PBA season, Tanduay was finalizing its sale to FedEx when Menk was traded to the crowd-favorite Barangay Ginebra Kings for Elmer Lago and a draft pick.

Menk's debut with the team was delayed, as he spent his time with the Philippine National Team for the 2002 Asian Games in Busan, South Korea. In the All-Filipino Cup, Menk finally made his Ginebra debut. In a win over the San Miguel Beermen, he exploded for 26 points. In his third game with Ginebra, he had a double-double of 14 points and 14 rebounds. He was unable to lead the Kings into the quarterfinals.

In 2003, Menk had strong performances during the season, however, Barangay Ginebra failed to enter the semi-finals of the All-Filipino Cup. His strong performances included a 45 point and 18 rebound double double against the Talk 'N Text Phone Pals that was nullified and a 38 point, 17 rebound double-double against FedEx. He also played in the 2003 PBA All-Star Game. He then had to sit out for a month due to a hamstring injury. Ginebra qualified for the quarterfinals in his return with import Rosell Ellis leading the way.

===== 2004–05 season =====
The 2004-2005 season marked Menk's biggest season yet. He led the Ginebra Kings to two consecutive PBA titles, winning the transition Fiesta Conference and the Philippine Cup. He also won the Best Player of the Conference honors during the two said tournaments. His 2004 Fiesta Conference championship was his first as a PBA player after leading Tanduay to numerous crowns in the PBL. He also got one of the highest votes to play in that year's All-Star game. During the 2005 Fiesta Conference, he was suspended indefinitely by the league for failure to show additional documents of his citizenship on time. Despite this, Menk still won that season's Most Valuable Player Award. He averaged 17.5 points and a league-best 11.8 rebounds in 71 total games.

===== 2005–06 season =====
Menk would return for Ginebra during the middle stages of the 2005–06 Fiesta Conference. In his first game back, he scored 17 points in a loss to Talk 'N Text. He got another double-double of 17 points and 17 rebounds as Ginebra won their fifth straight. He missed a game as he was suspended by the team for missing a practice without notice. While he led the Kings to the semifinals of the tournament, they were eliminated by eventual champion Red Bull Barako in seven grueling games. Throughout the Philippine Cup, he was hampered by an ankle sprain. He had three clutch free throws in a win over the Coca-Cola Tigers. During the 2006 PBA All-Star Game, his team, the PBA South All-Stars, won against the PBA North All-Stars, however, he didn't play due to a bruised knee. He missed several more games due to bone spurs. Still, he was able to help Ginebra make the quarterfinals, where in Game 2 of that series, he scored a season-high 35 points, 16 rebounds, two assists, and a block in a performance that helped them tie up the series. They eventually lost to Red Bull once again in that series, three games to two.

===== 2006–07 season =====
Going into the 2006–07 season, most pegged Ginebra as the team to beat, as they had acquired more frontcourt firepower with Billy Mamaril, Rafi Reavis, and Rudy Hatfield. In Ginebra's first game of the season, they beat the Welcoat Dragons 102–69, with him contributing 12 points. He then scored 20 points and 14 rebounds in a win over the Alaska Aces. Later in the 2006–07 Philippine Cup, Menk suffered calf and toe injuries in a bar fight, causing him to miss the rest of the tournament. Ginebra, led by Coach Jong Uichico and Jayjay Helterbrand, was able to win that conference's title in a finals series against the Beermen. This would be Ginebra's last All-Filipino title until 2020.

===== 2007–08 season =====
In 2008, the Ginebra Kings would return to the finals against Air21 in that year's Fiesta Conference. It was a long, grueling series where Ginebra lost several players to injury. Despite their losses, Ginebra stretched the series to seven games and eventually won their 4th championship in 4 years. Menk performed well in the series, especially in Game 7, in front of a record-setting 22,000 plus crowd at the legendary Araneta Coliseum. He finished with 21 points and 14 rebounds, while earning his 3rd PBA Finals MVP accolade.

===== 2008–09 season =====
Menk started the 2008–09 season unable to play due to injuries. He got back to his old self when he led his team with 17 points, and a game-winning follow-up basket over Alaska. They lost in the Philippine Cup quarterfinals to the Beermen. He was selected to play in the All-Star Game during the 2009 All-Star Weekend as a member of a PBA selection that went up against the Philippine national team. During the 2009 Fiesta Conference, he scored 22 points and six rebounds in a win over the Burger King Whoppers. They made the finals once again, but were defeated by the Beermen in seven games.

===== 2009–10 season =====
In 2009, Menk missed two weeks due to a fractured toe. In Game 3 of the 2009–10 Philippine Cup quarterfinals against Talk 'N Text, he had 20 points, seven rebounds, and three assists as Ginebra survived Talk 'N Text's attempt to eliminate them that game. Ginebra moved on to the semis, where they were swept by Alaska. At age 35, he was selected to another All-Star Game appearance. Later in the 2010 Fiesta Conference, he scored 19 points and eight rebounds in a win over Air21. He then had a conference-high 20 points the following game, which led to a win over Barako. With those performances, he earned Player of the Week honors. In a win over Alaska, he battled foul trouble to produce 25 points. He then missed six games due to a calf injury. Ginebra was eliminated in the first round by Alaska.

===== 2010–11 season =====
After losing the first game of the 2010–11 season to the Meralco Bolts, Menk contributed nine points against the Tigers for Ginebra's first win of the season. The Ginebra Kings made it all the way to the semifinals of the Philippine Cup, where they lost to the Beermen in six games. He then was selected to play in the 2011 All-Star Game. In the 2011 Commissioner's Cup, they made it to the finals against Talk 'N Text, and even managed to tie the series 1–1. Talk 'N Text however, went on to win the series. They also fell a win short of making it to the Governors' Cup finals.

===== 2011–12 season =====
In the offseason, Ginebra changed head coaches, replacing Coach Uichico with Coach Siot Tanquingcen. Menk also signed a one-year extension deal worth P4.2 million. In 2012 however, Ginebra made him an unrestricted free agent, and let him go. This was because Ginebra had drafted two Fil-Ams, Chris Ellis and Keith Jensen, reaching the five Fil-Am limit.

=== ASEAN Basketball League ===
Menk then played for the San Miguel Beermen in the ABL along with former national teammate and rival Asi Taulava in 2013. In the first game of the season, Menk and Taulava combined for 22 points and 10 rebounds in a road loss to the Saigon Heat. The team bounced back the following game, a rematch against Saigon, where this time he had nine points, three rebounds, an assist and they got the win. He then fractured his nose, causing him to be out for a month. They won the championship that season.

=== Return to PBA ===
==== GlobalPort Batang Pier ====
In the 2013–14 PBA season, at age 39, Menk signed with the GlobalPort Batang Pier. He got his first double-double with Globalport in an overtime win over Alaska in which he had 10 points and 11 rebounds. For the Commissioner's Cup, new head coach Pido Jarencio made him the team captain. However, he hurt his hamstring during practice, causing him to miss the entire conference as the Batang Pier finished with a league-worst 1–8 record.

==== Alaska Aces ====
After a brief stint with the GlobalPort, Menk was traded to the Alaska Aces for two second round picks in the 2014 draft. There, he was expected to be backup center for Sonny Thoss. He played with the Aces for 2 seasons.

After missing Alaska's first four games due to a groin injury, Menk made his season debut with six rebounds in a win over the Kia Sorento. With Thoss injured, he started and led the team with 14 points and 13 rebounds in 27 minutes in a win over the Blackwater Elite. He then contributed eight points and six rebounds in a win over Taulava's team, the NLEX Road Warriors. In the semifinals against RoS, he had 18 points and seven rebounds in a Game 2 loss, and a double-double of 13 points and 11 rebounds in a Game 3 win. Alaska then moved on to the finals. There they lost to the Beermen in seven games.

In the 2015–16 Philippine Cup, Menk had 12 points in a win over the Batang Pier. The next game, his nose was broken before halftime due to an accidental elbow from Marc Pingris, and he couldn't finish the game. No surgery was needed and he played the next game without a face mask, contributing nine points and six rebounds in a win over NLEX. That conference, they made it all the way to the finals, and even grabbed a 3–0 lead, but they lost once again to the Beermen. In the Commissioner's Cup playoffs, he stepped up in the absence of starting power forward Vic Manuel, and contributed 10 points and five rebounds to send Alaska to the semifinals. They would lose once again in the finals, this time to RoS.

=== Retirement ===
During the 2017 PBA Commissioner's Cup, he announced his retirement after playing for 17 seasons. The Aces made a tribute for his contributions in the PBA.

== Career statistics ==
Legend
GP	Games played	MPG	Minutes per game
FG%	Field-goal percentage	3P%	3-point field-goal percentage	FT%	Free-throw percentage
RPG	Rebounds per game	APG	Assists per game	SPG	Steals per game
BPG	Blocks per game	PPG	Points per game	**Bold**	Career high

=== PBA season-by-season averages ===
Year	Team	GP	MPG	FG%	3P%	FT%	RPG	APG	SPG	BPG	PPG
1999	Tanduay	48	**44.6**	**.478**	.303	.679	**13.2**	2.7	.5	.5	20.1
2000	Tanduay	27	43.8	.438	.261	.706	13.1	**2.9**	.4	.8	**24.2**
2001	Tanduay	5	36.2	**.478**	**.444**	**.840**	11.0	1.6	**.6**	.2	22.6
2002	Barangay Ginebra	9	32.8	.410	.292	.615	12.7	2.8	.4	**.9**	15.7
2003	Barangay Ginebra	34	36.8	.413	.189	.792	11.8	2.0	.5	.7	18.8
2004–05	Barangay Ginebra	**71**	38.1	.462	.339	.651	11.8	2.3	.4	.3	17.5
2005–06	Barangay Ginebra	41	33.5	.320	.062	.647	10.5	2.0	.3	.5	14.1
2006–07	Barangay Ginebra	37	26.6	.416	.200	.673	6.9	1.8	.2	.2	11.5
2007–08	Barangay Ginebra	40	23.8	.403	.077	.569	5.8	1.4	.3	.3	8.2
2008–09	Barangay Ginebra	38	22.6	.403	.267	.636	6.7	1.1	.3	.1	9.0
2009–10	Barangay Ginebra	39	22.0	.422	.308	.712	6.4	1.7	.2	.3	10.6
2010–11	Barangay Ginebra	43	18.1	.388	.294	.686	4.2	1.3	.1	.3	6.4
2011–12	Barangay Ginebra	7	8.9	.278	—	.400	2.6	.1	.1	.0	1.7
2013–14	GlobalPort	24	17.1	.413	—	.750	5.5	1.0	.3	.3	5.0
2014–15	Alaska	47	14.5	.438	.286	.710	3.7	.7	.3	.2	4.7
2015–16	Alaska	43	13.1	.369	.000	.585	3.2	.5	.1	.1	3.3
Career		553	27.6	.420	.264	.679	8.1	1.7	.3	.4	11.9

=== ABL ===
Year	Team	GP	MPG	FG%	3P%	FT%	RPG	APG	SPG	BPG	PPG
2013	San Miguel	19	14.0	.429	.333	.778	2.1	.4	.3	.1	4.9
Career		19	.140	.429	.333	.778	2.1	.4	.3	.1	4.9

== National team career ==
In 2002, Menk was selected to play in the National Team for the 2002 Asian Games in Busan, South Korea. However, the country went home without a medal. He started every game and averaged eight rebounds for the tournament.

In 2005, Menk was again included in the National Pool for future international competitions. However, with his citizenship still in limbo during the time, Menk failed to join Team Pilipinas in either the Jones Cup or the Brunei Sultan Cup.

In 2007, for the third time, Menk represented the Philippines again in the 2007 FIBA Asia Championship. Despite a 5-2 record, the Philippines finished 9th and did not qualify for the Olympics.

== Post-playing Career ==
=== With media ===
Menk hosted an online sports podcast called Staying Major on YouTube. He was also a basketball analyst for CNN Philippines and wrote articles on basketball for ABS-CBN.

=== As an assistant coach ===
In 2018, Menk joined Jimmy Alapag's coaching staff for Alab Pilipinas. He was with the team until 2020, when that season was suspended.

== Personal life ==
He has a wife, Erin, whom he met in the Philippines, and two children.

== Controversy ==
Menk's citizenship has been questioned since he arrived in the PBA in 1999. But unlike fellow Filipino-foreign cager Asi Taulava, Menk had fewer problems regarding his citizenship.

He was suspended twice by the league. In 2000, the PBA suspended the then-Tanduay cager indefinitely for failure to submit proper documents on time. In 2005, Menk was again suspended for failing to submit additional documents to the league for clarification.
