= 2004–05 PBA season =

30th PBA season

- Duration: October 3, 2004 – July 10, 2005
- Teams: 10
- TV partner(s): Local: ABC; International: The Filipino Channel

2004 PBA Draft
- Top draft pick: Rich Alvarez
- Picked by: Shell Turbo Chargers
- Season MVP: Eric Menk (Barangay Ginebra Kings)
- Philippine Cup champions: Barangay Ginebra Kings
- Philippine Cup runners-up: Talk 'N Text Phone Pals
- Fiesta Conference champions: San Miguel Beermen
- Fiesta Conference runners-up: Talk 'N Text Phone Pals

Seasons
- ← 2003 2005–06 →

The 2004–05 PBA season was the 30th season of the Philippine Basketball Association. Instead of the usual calendar year of February–December, the league changed its schedule to the current October–July format, while limiting the number of conferences from three to two. As part of the new league format, the season was preceded with a transition conference known as the 2004 PBA Fiesta Conference.

== Opening ceremonies ==
The muses for the participating teams are as follows:

Team	Muse
Alaska Aces	Maricel Soriano
Barangay Ginebra Kings	Maureen Larrazabal
Coca-Cola Tigers	Angel Locsin
FedEx Express	Cesca Litton
Purefoods TJ Hotdogs	Karel Marquez
Red Bull Thunder	
San Miguel Beermen	Cindy Kurleto
Shell Turbo Chargers	April Rodriguez
Sta. Lucia Realtors	Tessa Prieto
Talk 'N Text Phone Pals	Anne Curtis

== 2004-05 Philippine Cup ==
- The league began using Molten GL7 basketball as their official tournament ball starting this season.
- Barangay Ginebra won its first back-to-back titles and sixth overall crown with a 4-2 conquest over Talk 'N Text Phone Pals. The series was marred by a controversial reversal of the Phone Pals' Game 1 victory after fielding in an ineligible Taulava in the said game. Taulava was serving an indefinite suspension after being cited as one of six Filipino-American players with questionable citizenship papers.
- The San Miguel Beermen won third place after beating the Shell Turbo Chargers in a one-game match.
- Eric Menk won another Best Player of the Conference Award, his third in his PBA career.
- Chot Reyes left his post as the Coca Cola Tigers head coach to become the new coach of the Philippine national basketball team.

=== Classification round ===
Pos	Team	W	L	PCT	GB	Qualification
1	Barangay Ginebra Kings	13	5	.722	—	Advance to semifinals
2	Talk 'N Text Phone Pals	12	6	.667 (Note: Second-seed playoff: Talk 'N Text 85–79 Shell)	1	Advance to semifinals
3	Shell Turbo Chargers	12	6	.667	1	Twice-to-beat in the wildcard phase
4	Alaska Aces	9	9	.500 (Note: Head-to-head differential: Alaska +16, San Miguel +11, Purefoods −27; fourth-seed playoff: Alaska 98–91 San Miguel)	4	Twice-to-beat in the wildcard phase
5	San Miguel Beermen	9	9	.500	4	Best-of-three wildcard phase
6	Purefoods TJ Hotdogs	9	9	.500	4	Best-of-three wildcard phase
7	Coca-Cola Tigers	8	10	.444	5	Best-of-three wildcard phase
8	Sta. Lucia Realtors	6	12	.333 (Note: Head-to-head differential: Sta. Lucia +15, FedEx +4, Red Bull −19)	7	Best-of-three wildcard phase
9	FedEx Express	6	12	.333	7	Twice-to-win in the wildcard phase
10	Red Bull Thunder	6	12	.333	7	Twice-to-win in the wildcard phase

Source: PBA.ph

=== Playoffs ===
Wildcard phase
(#4 twice-to-beat)
4	Alaska	96
9	FedEx	93
(Best-of-3)
5	San Miguel	2
8	Sta. Lucia	0
(#3 twice-to-beat)
3	Shell	98
10	Red Bull	77
(Best-of-3)
6	Purefoods	2
7	Coca-Cola	1

Quarterfinals (Best-of-3)
4	Alaska	0
5	San Miguel	2
3	Shell	2
6	Purefoods	1

Semifinals (Best-of-5)
1	Barangay Ginebra	3
5	San Miguel	2
2	Talk 'N Text	3
3	Shell	0

Finals (Best-of-7)
1	Barangay Ginebra	4
2	Talk 'N Text	2
Third-place playoff
5	San Miguel	105
3	Shell	100

==== Wildcard phase ====
Team 1	Series	Team 2	Game 1	Game 2
(3) Shell Turbo Chargers*	1–0	(10) Red Bull Barako	98–77	—
(4) Alaska Aces*	1–0	(9) FedEx Express	96–93	—

Team 1	Series	Team 2	Game 1	Game 2	Game 3
(5) San Miguel Beermen	2–0	(8) Sta. Lucia Realtors	98–84	81–77	—
(6) Purefoods TJ Hotdogs	2–1	(7) Coca-Cola Tigers	91–95	74–81	74–71

*Team has twice-to-beat advantage. Team 1 only has to win once, while Team 2 has to win twice.

==== Quarterfinals ====
Team 1	Series	Team 2	Game 1	Game 2	Game 3
(3) Shell Turbo Chargers	2–1	(6) Purefoods TJ Hotdogs	71–69	71–90	106–95
(4) Alaska Aces	0–2	(5) San Miguel Beermen	87–91	86–97	—

==== Semifinals ====
Team 1	Series	Team 2	Game 1	Game 2	Game 3	Game 4	Game 5
(1) Barangay Ginebra Kings	3–2	(5) San Miguel Beermen	87–96	100–92	91–96	94–92	76–71
(2) Talk 'N Text Phone Pals	3–0	(5) Shell Turbo Chargers	101–89	92–84 (OT)	102–96	—	—

==== Third place playoff ====
Team 1	Score	Team 2
(3) Shell Turbo Chargers	100–105	(4) San Miguel Beermen

==== Finals ====
Team 1	Series	Team 2	Game 1	Game 2	Game 3	Game 4	Game 5	Game 6	Game 7
(1) Barangay Ginebra Kings	4–2	(2) Talk 'N Text Tropang Texters	~~71–89~~ (Note: PBA commissioner Noli Eala reversed Talk 'N Text's Game 1 win due to Asi Taulava, who was not cleared to play by the league and was therefore ineligible, played in the game.)	106–105	66–102	85–90	85–95 (2OT)	96–86	—

- Finals MVP: Eric Menk (Brgy. Ginebra)
- Best Player of the Conference: Eric Menk (Brgy. Ginebra)

== 2005 Fiesta Conference ==
San Miguel won its 17th PBA title with a 4-1 series victory over Talk N' Text. The league finally allowed Asi Taulava to play in the finals series.

Shell won third place over Red Bull in a one-game playoff, which turn out to be the last appearance of the Turbo Chargers in the league as it filed a leave of absence in August 2005. Shell eventually sell their rights to Welcoat.

Talk N' Text's Willie Miller was named the Best Player of the Conference while teammate Jerald Honeycutt won the Best Import plum.

=== Classification round ===
Pos	Team	W	L	PCT	GB	Qualification
1	Talk 'N Text Phone Pals	12	6	.667	—	Advance to semifinals
2	San Miguel Beermen	11	7	.611 (Note: Second-seed playoff: San Miguel 73–71 Alaska)	1	Advance to semifinals
3	Alaska Aces	11	7	.611	1	Twice-to-beat in wildcard phase
4	Sta. Lucia Realtors	10	8	.556	2	Twice-to-beat in wildcard phase
5	FedEx Express	9	9	.500 (Note: Head-to-head differential: FedEx +15, Red Bull −15)	3	Best-of-three wildcard phase
6	Red Bull Thunder	9	9	.500	3	Best-of-three wildcard phase
7	Barangay Ginebra Kings	8	10	.444	4	Best-of-three wildcard phase
8	Purefoods TJ Hotdogs	7	11	.389 (Note: Head-to-head differential: Purefoods +6, Shell −6)	5	Best-of-three wildcard phase
9	Shell Turbo Chargers	7	11	.389	5	Twice-to-win in wildcard phase
10	Coca-Cola Tigers	6	12	.333	6	Twice-to-win in wildcard phase

Source: PBA.ph

=== Playoffs ===
Wildcard phase
(#4 twice-to-beat)
4	Sta. Lucia	74	85
9	Shell	85	87
(Best-of-3)
5	FedEx	1
8	Purefoods	2
(#3 twice-to-beat)
3	Alaska	86
10	Coca-Cola	66
(Best-of-3)
6	Red Bull	2
7	Barangay Ginebra	0

Quarterfinals (Best-of-3)
9	Shell	2
8	Purefoods	0
3	Alaska	1
6	Red Bull	2

Semifinals (Best-of-5)
1	Talk 'N Text	3
9	Shell	1
2	San Miguel	3
6	Red Bull	1

Finals (Best-of-7)
1	Talk 'N Text	1
2	San Miguel	4
Third place playoff
9	Shell	102
6	Red Bull	86

==== Wildcard phase ====
Team 1	Series	Team 2	Game 1	Game 2
(3) Alaska Aces*	1–0	(10) Coca-Cola Tigers	86–66	—
(4) Sta. Lucia Realtors*	0–2	(9) Shell Turbo Chargers	74–85	85–87

Team 1	Series	Team 2	Game 1	Game 2	Game 3
(5) FedEx Express	1–2	(8) Purefoods TJ Hotdogs	87–98	99–89	86–94
(6) Red Bull Barako	2–0	(7) Barangay Ginebra Kings	99–84	90–89	—

*Team has twice-to-beat advantage. Team 1 only has to win once, while Team 2 has to win twice.

==== Quarterfinals ====
Team 1	Series	Team 2	Game 1	Game 2	Game 3
(3) Alaska Aces	1–2	(6) Red Bull Barako	89–80	71–84	86–87
(9) Shell Turbo Chargers	2–0	(8) Purefoods TJ Hotdogs	86–79	87–80	—

==== Semifinals ====
Team 1	Series	Team 2	Game 1	Game 2	Game 3	Game 4	Game 5
(1) Talk 'N Text Phone Pals	3–1	(9) Shell Turbo Chargers	97–74	92–94	91–78	96–91	—
(2) San Miguel Beermen	3–1	(6) Red Bull Barako	89–81	77–79	80–70	88–86	—

===== Third place playoff =====
Team 1	Score	Team 2
(6) Red Bull Barako	86–102	(9) Shell Turbo Chargers

==== Finals ====
Team 1	Series	Team 2	Game 1	Game 2	Game 3	Game 4	Game 5	Game 6	Game 7
(1) Talk 'N Text Tropang Texters	1–4	(2) San Miguel Beermen	66–74	79–81	103–77	82–87	87–91	—	—

- Finals MVP: Danny Ildefonso (San Miguel)
- Best Player of the Conference: Willie Miller (Talk 'N Text)
- Best Import Award: Jerald Honeycutt (Talk 'N Text)

== Awards ==
- Most Valuable Player: Eric Menk (Brgy. Ginebra)
- Rookie of the Year: Rich Alvarez (Shell)
- Most Improved Player: Enrico Villanueva (Red Bull)
- Mythical First Team
  - Eric Menk (Brgy. Ginebra)
  - Jimmy Alapag (Talk N' Text)
  - Willie Miller (Talk N' Text)
  - Nic Belasco (San Miguel)
  - Dorian Peña (San Miguel)
- Mythical Second Team
  - Mark Caguioa (Brgy. Ginebra)
  - Olsen Racela (San Miguel)
  - Mark Telan (Talk N' Text)
  - Tony dela Cruz (Shell)
  - Rommel Adducul (Brgy. Ginebra)
- All-Defensive Team
  - Enrico Villanueva (Red Bull)
  - Rich Alvarez (Shell)
  - Junthy Valenzuela (Red Bull)
  - Johnny Abarrientos (Coca-Cola)
  - Dennis Espino (Sta. Lucia)

=== Awards given by the PBA Press Corps ===
- Coach of the Year: Siot Tanquincen (Barangay Ginebra)
- Mr. Quality Minutes: Ronald Tubid (Shell)
- Comeback Player of the Year: Jayjay Helterbrand (Barangay Ginebra)
- Referee of the Year: Luisito Cruz
- All-Rookie Team
  - Paul Artadi (Purefoods)
  - James Yap (Purefoods)
  - Rich Alvarez (Shell)
  - Ranidel de Ocampo (Air21)
  - Sonny Thoss (Alaska)

== Cumulative standings ==
Pos	Team	Pld	W	L	PCT	Best finish
1	Talk 'N Text Phone Pals	55	34	21	.618	Finalist
2	San Miguel Beermen	57	35	22	.614	Champions
3	Barangay Ginebra Kings	49	28	21	.571	Champions
4	Alaska Aces	45	24	21	.533	Quarterfinalist
5	Shell Turbo Chargers	54	28	26	.519	Third place
6	Purefoods TJ Hotdogs	47	21	26	.447	Quarterfinalist
7	Red Bull Thunder	47	20	27	.426	Semifinalist
8	Sta. Lucia Realtors	40	16	24	.400	Wildcard phase
9	FedEx Express	40	16	24	.400	Wildcard phase
10	Coca-Cola Tigers	40	15	25	.375	Wildcard phase

=== Classification round ===
Pos	Team	Pld	W	L	PCT
1	Talk 'N Text Phone Pals	36	24	12	.667
2	Barangay Ginebra Kings	36	21	15	.583
3	Alaska Aces	36	20	16	.556
4	San Miguel Beermen	36	20	16	.556
5	Shell Turbo Chargers	36	19	17	.528
6	Purefoods TJ Hotdogs	36	16	20	.444
7	Sta. Lucia Realtors	36	16	20	.444
8	FedEx Express	36	15	21	.417
9	Red Bull Thunder	36	15	21	.417
10	Coca-Cola Tigers	36	14	22	.389

=== Playoffs ===
Pos	Team	Pld	W	L
1	San Miguel Beermen	21	15	6
2	Talk 'N Text Phone Pals	19	10	9
3	Shell Turbo Chargers	18	9	9
4	Barangay Ginebra Kings	13	7	6
5	Purefoods TJ Hotdogs	11	5	6
6	Red Bull Thunder	11	5	6
7	Alaska Aces	9	4	5
8	FedEx Express	4	1	3
9	Coca-Cola Tigers	4	1	3
10	Sta. Lucia Realtors	4	0	4
