= 2005–06 Air21 Express season =

- Head coach: Bo Perasol

Fiesta Conference results
- Record: 17–15 (53.1%)
- Place: 3rd
- Playoff finish: Semifinals

Philippine Cup results
- Record: 9–11 (45%)
- Place: 7th
- Playoff finish: Wildcard

Air21 Express seasons

The 2005–06 Air21 Express season was the 4th season of the franchise in the Philippine Basketball Association (PBA).

== Key dates ==
- August 14: The 2005 PBA Draft took place in Sta. Lucia East Grand Mall, Cainta, Rizal.

== Draft picks ==
Round	Pick	Player	Height	Position	Nationality	College
1	1	Anthony Washington	6'7"	Forward	United States	Eckerd
1	5	Mark Cardona	6'1"	Guard-Forward	Philippines	La Salle
1	6	Niño Canaleta	6'6"	Forward	Philippines	UE

== Roster ==
2005–06 Air21 Express roster
Players
Coaches

Pos.	#	POB	Name	Height	Weight	DOB (YYYY–MM–DD)	From
F	5	(United States)	Shawn Daniels (I)	6 ft 8 in (2.03 m)	250 lb (113 kg)	1979-05-14	Utah State
G/F	8	(Philippines)	Ronald Tubid	6 ft 1 in (1.85 m)	185 lb (84 kg)	1981-10-15	UE
F	9	(Philippines)	Niño Canaleta (R)	6 ft 6 in (1.98 m)	200 lb (91 kg)	1982-02-12	UE
F/C	13	(Philippines)	Mark Telan	6 ft 7 in (2.01 m)	210 lb (95 kg)	1976-01-12	De La Salle
F/C	16	(Philippines)	Homer Se	6 ft 6 in (1.98 m)	220 lb (100 kg)	1977-05-35	San Sebastian
G/F	17	(Philippines)	Bruce Dacia	6 ft 3 in (1.91 m)	180 lb (82 kg)	1977-09-27	Visayas
C	18	(Philippines)	Yancy De Ocampo	6 ft 9 in (2.06 m)	235 lb (107 kg)	1980-11-11	Saint Francis of Assisi
G	19	(Philippines)	Wynne Arboleda	5 ft 11 in (1.80 m)	180 lb (82 kg)	1976-11-26	MLQU
G	20	(Philippines)	Gary David	6 ft 2 in (1.88 m)	180 lb (82 kg)	1978-07-13	Lyceum
G	25	(Philippines)	Leo Avenido	6 ft 2 in (1.88 m)	170 lb (77 kg)		Far Eastern
F/C	26	(Philippines)	Ryan Bernardo	6 ft 4 in (1.93 m)	235 lb (107 kg)		UST
G	29	(Philippines)	Stephen Padilla	5 ft 11 in (1.80 m)	165 lb (75 kg)		Visayas
F	33	(Philippines)	Ranidel De Ocampo	6 ft 5 in (1.96 m)	225 lb (102 kg)	1981-12-08	Saint Francis of Assisi

Head coach

- (Philippines) Bo Perasol

Assistant coach(es)

- (Philippines) Ricky Dandan
- (Philippines) Allan Gregorio
- (Philippines) Johny Tam

Legend

- (C) Team captain
- (CI) Commissioner's Cup Import
- (GI) Governors' Cup Import
- (EI) EASL Import
- (DP) Unsigned draft pick
- (FA) Free agent
- (IN) Inactive
- (S) Suspended
- (R) Rookie
- Injured

== Fiesta Conference ==
=== Game log ===
2005–06 PBA Fiesta Conference game log
October

Game	Date	Opponent	Score	High points	High rebounds	High assists	Location Attendance	Record
1	October 7	Purefoods	88–86	Ritualo (17)			Ynares Center	1–0
2	October 12	Talk 'N Text	91–109	Ritualo (23)			Ynares Center	1–1
3	October 16	Red Bull	77–84	Daniels (23)			Araneta Coliseum	1–2
4	October 21	Alaska	108–111 (2OT)	Daniels (24)			Araneta Coliseum	1–3
5	October 23	Sta. Lucia	110–95	Daniels (30)			Araneta Coliseum	2–3
6	October 29	San Miguel	119–123 (2OT)	De Ocampo (21)			Roxas City	2–4

November

Game	Date	Opponent	Score	High points	High rebounds	High assists	Location Attendance	Record
7	November 4	Talk 'N Text	90–88	Ritualo (17)			Ynares Center	3–4
8	November 6	Brgy.Ginebra	83–93	Ferriols (22)			Araneta Coliseum	3–5
9	November 11	San Miguel	90–86	Daniels (22)			Araneta Coliseum	4–5
10	November 16	Alaska	88–83	David (28)			Araneta Coliseum	5–5
11	November 20	Sta.Lucia	114–103	Daniels (24)			Cuneta Astrodome	6–5
12	November 23	Coca Cola	106–115	Ritualo (31)			Araneta Coliseum	6–6

December

Game	Date	Opponent	Score	High points	High rebounds	High assists	Location Attendance	Record
13	December 10	Brgy.Ginebra	109–101	Daniels (30)			Ormoc City	7–6
14	December 14	Red Bull					Cuneta Astrodome	7–7
15	December 16	Coca Cola	98–94	De Ocampo (28)			Cuneta Astrodome	8–7
16	December 18	Purefoods	110–109	Ritualo (22)			Ynares Center	9–7

2005–06 schedule

== Transactions ==
=== Pre-season ===
Players Added

Via Draft

- Niño Canaleta

Via Free Agency

- Ronald Tubid (From defunct Shell Turbo Chargers)

Via Trade

- Yancy De Ocampo (From Talk 'N Text Phone Pals)
- Patrick Fran (From Talk 'N Text Phone Pals)
Players Lost

Via Trade

- Egay Billones (To Purefoods Chunkee Giants)
- Marc Pingris (To Purefoods Chunkee Giants)
- Roger Yap (To Purefoods Chunkee Giants)
- Jay Washington (Drafted rookie to Talk 'N Text Phone Pals)
- Mark Cardona (Drafted rookie to Talk 'N Text Phone Pals)

=== Trades ===
March, 2006	To Air21 Express Mark Telan	To Talk 'N Text Phone Pals John Ferriols
May 8, 2006	To Air21 Express Leo Avenido	To Talk 'N Text Phone Pals Renren Ritualo, Patrick Fran

=== Additions ===
Player	Signed	Former team
Stephen Padilla	March 2006	Alaska Aces

=== Subtractions ===
Player	Signed	New team
Wesley Gonzales	March 2006	San Miguel Beermen
