= 2005–06 Coca-Cola Tigers season =

- Head coach: Binky Favis
- General Manager: Hector Calma
- Owner(s): Coca-Cola Bottlers Philippines

Fiesta Conference results
- Record: 7–11 (38.9%)
- Place: 9th
- Playoff finish: N/A

Philippine Cup results
- Record: 9–12 (42.9%)
- Place: 5th
- Playoff finish: Quarterfinals

Coca-Cola Tigers seasons

The 2005–06 Coca-Cola Tigers season was the 4th season of the franchise in the Philippine Basketball Association (PBA).

== Key dates ==
- August 14: The 2005 PBA Draft took place in Sta. Lucia East Grand Mall, Cainta, Rizal.

== Draft picks ==
Round	Pick	Player	Height	Position	Nationality	College
1	3	Dennis Miranda	5'11"	Guard	Philippines	Far Eastern
2	11	Neil Rañeses	6'4"	Forward	Philippines	Visayas
2	12	Al Magpayo	6'5"	Forward - Center	Philippines	St. Benilde

== Roster ==
2005–06 Coca-Cola Tigers roster
Players

Pos.	#	POB	Name	Height	Weight	DOB (YYYY–MM–DD)	From
F	2	(Philippines)	Billy Mamaril	6 ft 6 in (1.98 m)	225 lb (102 kg)	1980-06-25	Bakersfield
G	3	(Philippines)	Dennis Miranda	5 ft 11 in (1.80 m)	195 lb (88 kg)	1982-07-14	Far Eastern
F/C	4	(United States)	Rafi Reavis	6 ft 6 in (1.98 m)	210 lb (95 kg)	1977-07-27	Coppin State
G/F	5	(United States)	Rob Wainwright	6 ft 5 in (1.96 m)	200 lb (91 kg)	1973-12-27	Solano CC
C	9	(Philippines)	Gilbert Lao	6 ft 7 in (2.01 m)	210 lb (95 kg)	1978-09-13	UST
G	10	(Philippines)	Renato Morano	6 ft 0 in (1.83 m)	171 lb (78 kg)	1972-02-12	San Beda
F	11	(Philippines)	Gerard Francisco	6 ft 3 in (1.91 m)		1977-11-02	UST
G	14	(Philippines)	Johnny Abarrientos	5 ft 8 in (1.73 m)	161 lb (73 kg)	1970-07-17	Far Eastern
F	19	(Philippines)	Neil Rañeses	6 ft 4 in (1.93 m)	190 lb (86 kg)	1981-03-01	Visayas
G/F	31	(United States)	John Arigo	6 ft 4 in (1.93 m)	185 lb (84 kg)	1978-12-10	North Florida
G	34	(United States)	William Antonio	6 ft 3 in (1.91 m)	190 lb (86 kg)	1975-08-15	Chaminade
G	50	(Philippines)	Dale Singson	6 ft 0 in (1.83 m)	180 lb (82 kg)	1975-12-02	UST
F/C	73	(United States)	Ali Peek	6 ft 4 in (1.93 m)	275 lb (125 kg)	1975-02-13	Saint Mary's
C		(Philippines)	Ronald Capati	6 ft 5 in (1.96 m)		1981-05-11	St. Benilde
G		(Philippines)	Tony Boy Espinosa	5 ft 7 in (1.70 m)	146 lb (66 kg)	1974-04-25	De La Salle
F	33	(United States)	Alex Carcamo (I)	6 ft 7 in (2.01 m)		1977-08-28	Eastern Washington
G/F		(United States)	Omar Thomas (I)	6 ft 5 in (1.96 m)	232 lb (105 kg)	1982-02-27	UTEP

Coaches
Head coach
- (Philippines) Binky Favis
Assistant(s)
- (Philippines) Mon Jose
- (Philippines) Nash Racela
- (Philippines) Biboy Ravanes

Legend
- (DP) Unsigned draft pick
- (FA) Free agent
- (S) Suspended
- (I) Import
- Injured

== Fiesta Conference ==
=== Game log ===
2005–06 PBA Fiesta Conference game log
October

Game	Date	Opponent	Score	High points	High rebounds	High assists	Location Attendance	Record
1	October 5	Brgy.Ginebra	81–89	Arigo (22)			Araneta Coliseum	0–1
2	October 12	San Miguel	79-77	Mamaril, Carcamo (14)			Ynares Center	1–1
3	October 15	Sta.Lucia	79–89	Peek (21)			Lanao del Norte	1–2
4	October 21	Talk 'N Text	81–82	Arigo (18)			Araneta Coliseum	1–3
5	October 26	Purefoods	87–103	Thomas (28)			Araneta Coliseum	1–4
6	October 28	Alaska					Cuneta Astrodome	1–5

November

Game	Date	Opponent	Score	High points	High rebounds	High assists	Location Attendance	Record
7	November 5	Red Bull	82-64	Thomas (24)			Tacloban City	2–5
8	November 9	Purefoods					Araneta Coliseum	2–6
9	November 13	Alaska	86-63	Thomas (27)			Araneta Coliseum	3–6
10	November 19	Brgy.Ginebra	79-67				Lucena City	4–6
11	November 23	Air21	115-106	Thomas (39)			Araneta Coliseum	5–6

December

Game	Date	Opponent	Score	High points	High rebounds	High assists	Location Attendance	Record
12	December 9	San Miguel	76–90	Thomas (23)			Cuneta Astrodome	5–7
13	December 11	Talk 'N Text	73-67	Thomas (24)			Ynares Center	6–7
14	December 16	Air21	94–98	Thomas (24)			Cuneta Astrodome	6–8
15	December 18	Sta.Lucia	76–100	Thomas (29)			Ynares Center	6–9
16	December 23	Red Bull	77–78	Arigo (24)			Cuneta Astrodome	6–10

2005–06 schedule

== Transactions ==
=== Pre-season ===
Players Added

Via Draft

- Dennis Miranda
- Neil Rañeses

Via Free Agency

- Tonyboy Espinosa (From Purefoods TJ Hotdogs)
- Gerard Francisco (From Sta. Lucia Realtors)
- Billy Mamaril (From defunct Shell Turbo Chargers)
Players Lost

Via Free Agency

- Leo Avenido (To Talk 'N Text Phone Pals)
- Edwin Bacani
- Rudy Hatfield

=== Subtractions ===
Player	Signed	New team
Poch Juinio	March 2006	Talk 'N Text Phone Pals
