= 2005–06 Sta. Lucia Realtors season =

13th season of the franchise in the Philippine Basketball Association

- Head coach: Alfrancis Chua
- Owner(s): Sta. Lucia Realty and Development Corporation

Fiesta Conference results
- Record: 7–11 (38.9%)
- Place: 7th
- Playoff finish: Wildcard

Philippine Cup results
- Record: 5–14 (26.3%)
- Place: 9th
- Playoff finish: Wildcard

Sta. Lucia Realtors seasons

The 2005–06 Sta.Lucia Realtors season was the 13th season of the franchise in the Philippine Basketball Association (PBA).

== Key dates ==
- August 14: The 2005 PBA Draft took place in Sta. Lucia East Grand Mall, Cainta, Rizal.

== Draft picks ==
Round	Pick	Player	Height	Position	Nationality	College
1	2	Alex Cabagnot	6'1"	Guard	United States	UH Hilo
2	10	Cesar Catli	6'3"	Guard	Philippines	FEU

== Roster ==
2005–06 Sta. Lucia Realtors roster
Players

Pos.	#	POB	Name	Height	Weight	DOB (YYYY–MM–DD)	From
G	1	(Philippines)	Ronald Cuan	5 ft 11 in (1.80 m)			De La Salle
F	3	(Philippines)	Nelbert Omolon	6 ft 4 in (1.93 m)			Philippine Christian
G	4	(Philippines)	Jimwell Torion	5 ft 9 in (1.75 m)			SCSIT
G	5	(United States)	Alex Cabagnot	6 ft 1 in (1.85 m)			Hawaiʻi–Hilo
G	6	(Philippines)	Cesar Catli	6 ft 3 in (1.91 m)			Far Eastern
G	8	(Philippines)	Paolo Mendoza	5 ft 11 in (1.80 m)			Philippines
C	13	(Philippines)	Marlou Aquino	6 ft 9 in (2.06 m)			Adamson
F/C	16	(Philippines)	Dennis Espino	6 ft 6 in (1.98 m)			UST
F	17	(Philippines)	Chester Tolomia	6 ft 2 in (1.88 m)			UPHSD
G/F	19	(Philippines)	Kenneth Duremdes	6 ft 3 in (1.91 m)			Adamson
F/C	21	(Philippines)	Adonis Santa Maria	6 ft 5 in (1.96 m)			De La Salle
C	22	(Philippines)	Oliver Agapito	6 ft 6 in (1.98 m)			St. Benilde
F	24	(Philippines)	Ricky Calimag	6 ft 3 in (1.91 m)			San Beda
F	28	(Philippines)	Norman Gonzales	6 ft 4 in (1.93 m)			San Beda
G	45	(Philippines)	Gilbert Demape	6 ft 1 in (1.85 m)			Cebu Tech
F		(United States)	Luke Whitehead (I)	6 ft 6 in (1.98 m)			Louisville
F		(United States)	Leonard White (I)	6 ft 7 in (2.01 m)			Southern
F	23	(United States)	Omar Weaver (I)	6 ft 8 in (2.03 m)
G/F	27	(United States)	Damian Owens (I)	6 ft 4 in (1.93 m)			West Virginia

Coaches
Head coach
- (Philippines) Alfrancis Chua
Assistant(s)
- (Philippines) Boyet Fernandez

Legend
- (DP) Unsigned draft pick
- (FA) Free agent
- (S) Suspended
- (I) Import
- Injured

== Fiesta Conference ==
=== Game log ===
2006 PBA Fiesta Conference game log
October

Game	Date	Opponent	Score	High points	High rebounds	High assists	Location Attendance	Record
1	October 5	Alaska	75-80				Araneta Coliseum	0–1
2	October 9	Brgy.Ginebra	92-88	Mendoza (25)			Araneta Coliseum	1–1
3	October 15	Coca Cola	89-79	Whitehead (35)			Lanao del Norte	2–1
4	October 19	Talk 'N Text	80-87				Araneta Coliseum	2–2
5	October 23	Air21	95-110	Espino (25)			Araneta Coliseum	2–3
6	October 28	Red Bull	78-95	White (16)			Cuneta Astrodome	2–4
7	October 30	Brgy.Ginebra	89-96	Weaver (28)			Araneta Coliseum	2–5

November

Game	Date	Opponent	Score	High points	High rebounds	High assists	Location Attendance	Record
8	November 4	Purefoods					Ynares Center	2–6
9	November 9	San Miguel	85-82	Aquino (23)			Araneta Coliseum	3–6
10	November 12	Talk 'N Text	100-97	Weaver (25)			Zamboanga City	4–6
11	November 18	San Miguel	85-80				Ynares Center	5–6
12	November 20	Air21	103-114	Calimag (20)			Cuneta Astrodome	5–7

December

Game	Date	Opponent	Score	High points	High rebounds	High assists	Location Attendance	Record
13	December 7	Alaska	82-87	Owens (19)			Ynares Center	5–8
14	December 9	Red Bull	105-104 (2OT)	Owens (25)			Cuneta Astrodome	6–8
15	December 14	Purefoods	75-84	Owens (22)			Cuneta Astrodome	6–9
16	December 18	Coca Cola	100-76	Duremdes (28)			Ynares Center	7–9

2005–06 schedule

== Transactions ==
=== Additions ===
Player	Signed	Former team
Jimwell Torion	May 2006	Red Bull Barako
