= 2005–06 San Miguel Beermen season =

- Head coach: Jong Uichico
- General Manager: Chito Loyzaga
- Owner(s): San Miguel Corporation

Fiesta Conference results
- Record: 8–13 (38.1%)
- Place: 8th
- Playoff finish: Wildcard

Philippine Cup results
- Record: 14–10 (58.3%)
- Place: 4th
- Playoff finish: Semifinals

San Miguel Beermen seasons

The 2005–06 San Miguel Beermen season was the 31st season of the franchise in the Philippine Basketball Association (PBA).

== Key dates ==
- August 14: The 2005 PBA Draft took place in Sta. Lucia East Grand Mall, Cainta, Rizal.

== Draft picks ==
Round	Pick	Player	Height	Position	Nationality	College
1	8	Paolo Hubalde	5'11"	Guard	Philippines	UE

== Roster ==
2005–06 San Miguel Beermen roster
Players

Pos.	#	POB	Name	Height	Weight	DOB (YYYY–MM–DD)	From
G	1	(Philippines)	Paolo Hubalde	5 ft 11 in (1.80 m)			UE
C	4	(United States)	Dorian Peña	6 ft 6 in (1.98 m)			Coppin State
SG	5	(United States)	Brandon Cablay	6 ft 0 in (1.83 m)			Vanguard
G	7	(Philippines)	Dondon Hontiveros	6 ft 2 in (1.88 m)			Cebu
F/C	10	(Philippines)	Danny Ildefonso	6 ft 6 in (1.98 m)			National-U
G	11	(Philippines)	Francis Adriano	6 ft 0 in (1.83 m)			Far Eastern
C	15	(Philippines)	Mark Kong	6 ft 8 in (2.03 m)			Adamson
G	17	(Philippines)	Olsen Racela	5 ft 10 in (1.78 m)			Ateneo
F	23	(Philippines)	Wesley Gonzales	6 ft 4 in (1.93 m)			Ateneo
F	28	(United States)	Miguel Noble	6 ft 5 in (1.96 m)			Utica
F	42	(United States)	Danny Seigle	6 ft 6 in (1.98 m)			Wagner
G	44	(United States)	Denver Lopez	6 ft 1 in (1.85 m)			Cal State Fullerton
G	88	(Philippines)	Chris Calaguio	6 ft 2 in (1.88 m)			Letran
F	23	(United States)	Rico Hill (I)	6 ft 7 in (2.01 m)			Illinois State
G	23	(United States)	Kwan Johnson (I)	6 ft 3 in (1.91 m)			LSU New Orleans

Coaches
Head coach
- (Philippines) Jong Uichico
Assistant(s)
- (Philippines) Arturo Dela Cruz
- (Philippines) Boybits Victoria
- (Philippines) Richie Ticzon

Legend
- (DP) Unsigned draft pick
- (FA) Free agent
- (S) Suspended
- (I) Import
- Injured

== Fiesta Conference ==
=== Game log ===
2006 PBA Fiesta Conference game log
October

Game	Date	Opponent	Score	High points	High rebounds	High assists	Location Attendance	Record
1	October 7	Talk 'N Text	66–74	Hill (21)			Ynares Center	0–1
2	October 12	Coca Cola	77–79	Seigle (27)			Ynares Center	0–2
3	October 16	Purefoods	90–92 OT	Seigle (30)			Araneta Coliseum	0–3
4	October 23	Red Bull	74–76	Hill (19)			Araneta Coliseum	0–4
5	October 29	Air21	123–119 (2OT)	Hill (22)			Roxas City	1–4

November

Game	Date	Opponent	Score	High points	High rebounds	High assists	Location Attendance	Record
6	November 2	Brgy.Ginebra	72–74	Hill (20)			Cuneta Astrodome	1–5
7	November 9	Sta.Lucia	82–85	Ildefonso (18)			Araneta Coliseum	1–6
8	November 11	Air21	86–90	Johnson (19)			Araneta Coliseum	1–7
9	November 18	Sta.Lucia	80–85				Ynares Center	1–8

December

Game	Date	Opponent	Score	High points	High rebounds	High assists	Location Attendance	Record
10	December 2	Alaska	66–62				Araneta Coliseum	2–8
11	December 6	Red Bull	83–77				Iloilo City	3–8
12	December 9	Coca Cola	90–76	Belasco (17)			Cuneta Astrodome	4–8
13	December 11	Purefoods	74–68	Seigle (23)			Ynares Center	5–8
14	December 16	Brgy.Ginebra	86–78				Cuneta Astrodome	6–8
15	December 21	Alaska					Cuneta Astrodome	6–9
16	December 23	Talk 'N Text	73–94				Cuneta Astrodome	6–10

2005–06 schedule

== Transactions ==
=== Trades ===
March, 2006	To San Miguel Beermen Brandon Cablay	To Alaska Aces Nic Belasco

=== Additions ===
Player	Signed	Former team
Wesley Gonzales	March 2006	Air21 Express

=== Subtractions ===
Player	Signed	New team
Eugene Tejada	March 2006	Purefoods Chunkie Giants
Anton Villoria	March 2006	Talk 'N Text Phone Pals
