= 2005–06 Red Bull Barako season =

- Head coach: Yeng Guiao
- General Manager: Tony Chua
- Owner(s): Tony Chua

Fiesta Conference results
- Record: 20–13 (60.6%)
- Place: 1st
- Playoff finish: Champions

Philippine Cup results
- Record: 18–16 (52.9%)
- Place: 2nd
- Playoff finish: Runner-up

Red Bull Barako seasons

The 2005–06 Red Bull Barako season was the 6th season of the franchise in the Philippine Basketball Association (PBA).

== Key dates ==
- August 14: The 2005 PBA Draft took place in Sta. Lucia East Grand Mall, Cainta, Rizal.

== Draft picks ==
Round	Pick	Player	Height	Position	Nationality	College
1	9	Leo Najorda	6'3"	Guard-Forward	Philippines	SSC
2	14	Larry Fonacier	6'2"	Guard	Philippines	Ateneo
2	17	Paolo Bugia	6'6"	Forward-Center	Philippines	Ateneo

== Roster ==
2005–06 Red Bull Barako roster
Players

Pos.	#	POB	Name	Height	Weight	DOB (YYYY–MM–DD)	From
G	1	(Philippines)	Celino Cruz	5 ft 9 in (1.75 m)			Far Eastern
G	4	(Philippines)	Warren Ybañez	5 ft 8 in (1.73 m)			PSBA
PG	5	(Philippines)	Topex Robinson	5 ft 8 in (1.73 m)			San Sebastian
F/C	7	(Australia)	Mick Pennisi	6 ft 9 in (2.06 m)			Eastern Michigan
G/F	8	(Philippines)	Cyrus Baguio	6 ft 2 in (1.88 m)			UST
F	10	(Philippines)	Junthy Valenzuela	6 ft 2 in (1.88 m)			SCSIT
F	11	(Philippines)	Rich Alvarez	6 ft 4 in (1.93 m)			Ateneo
G	12	(Philippines)	Larry Fonacier	6 ft 2 in (1.88 m)			Ateneo
F/C	14	(Philippines)	Enrico Villanueva	6 ft 5 in (1.96 m)			Ateneo
F	15	(Philippines)	Lordy Tugade	6 ft 3 in (1.91 m)			National-U
F	20	(Philippines)	Leo Najorda	6 ft 3 in (1.91 m)			San Sebastian
F/C	21	(Philippines)	Paolo Bugia	6 ft 6 in (1.98 m)			Ateneo
C	32	(Philippines)	Edward Joseph Feihl	7 ft 1 in (2.16 m)			Adamson
F	34	(United States)	Mike Hrabak	6 ft 6 in (1.98 m)			Central Arizona
F	45	(United States)	Quemont Greer (I)	6 ft 7 in (2.01 m)			DePaul
F	23	(United States)	James Penny (I)	6 ft 6 in (1.98 m)			Texas Christian University

Coaches

Head coach

- (Philippines) Yeng Guiao

Assistant coach(es)

- (Philippines) Roehl Nadurata
- (Philippines) Gee Abanilla

Legend

- (C) Team captain
- (I) Import
- Injured

== Fiesta Conference ==
=== Game log ===
2006 PBA Fiesta Conference game log
October

Game	Date	Opponent	Score	High points	High rebounds	High assists	Location Attendance	Record
1	October 2	Purefoods	77–84	Greer (37)			Araneta Coliseum	0–1
2	October 9	Alaska	76-75	Greer (40)			Araneta Coliseum	1–1
3	October 14	Brgy.Ginebra					Cuneta Astrodome	1–2
4	October 16	Air21	84-77	Greer (25)			Araneta Coliseum	2–2
5	October 23	San Miguel	76-74	Greer (23)			Araneta Coliseum	3–2
6	October 28	Sta.Lucia	95-78	Greer (28)			Cuneta Astrodome	4–2

November

Game	Date	Opponent	Score	High points	High rebounds	High assists	Location Attendance	Record
7	November 2	Alaska	64–81	Greer (17)			Cuneta Astrodome	4–3
8	November 5	Coca Cola	64–82	Greer (16)			Tacloban City	4–4
9	November 11	Brgy.Ginebra					Araneta Coliseum	5–4
10	November 13	Purefoods	95–97	Greer (34)			Araneta Coliseum	5–5
11	November 18	Talk 'N Text	91-89	Greer (24)			Ynares Center	6–5
12	November 20	Talk 'N Text	99-92	Tugade (28)			Cuneta Astrodome	7–5

December

Game	Date	Opponent	Score	High points	High rebounds	High assists	Location Attendance	Record
13	December 6	San Miguel	77–83	Greer (27)			Iloilo City	7–6
14	December 9	Sta.Lucia	104–105 (2OT)	Greer (29)			Cuneta Astrodome	7–7
15	December 14	Air21					Cuneta Astrodome	8–7
16	December 23	Coca Cola	78-77	Greer (24)			Cuneta Astrodome	9–7

2005–06 schedule

== Transactions ==
=== Additions ===
Player	Signed	Former team
Mike Hrabak	April 2006	Purefoods TJ Hotdogs

=== Subtractions ===
Player	Signed	New team
Nelson Asaytono	N/A	
Jimwell Torion	May 2006	Sta. Lucia Realtors
