= Paolo Bugia =

Filipino former basketball player and executive

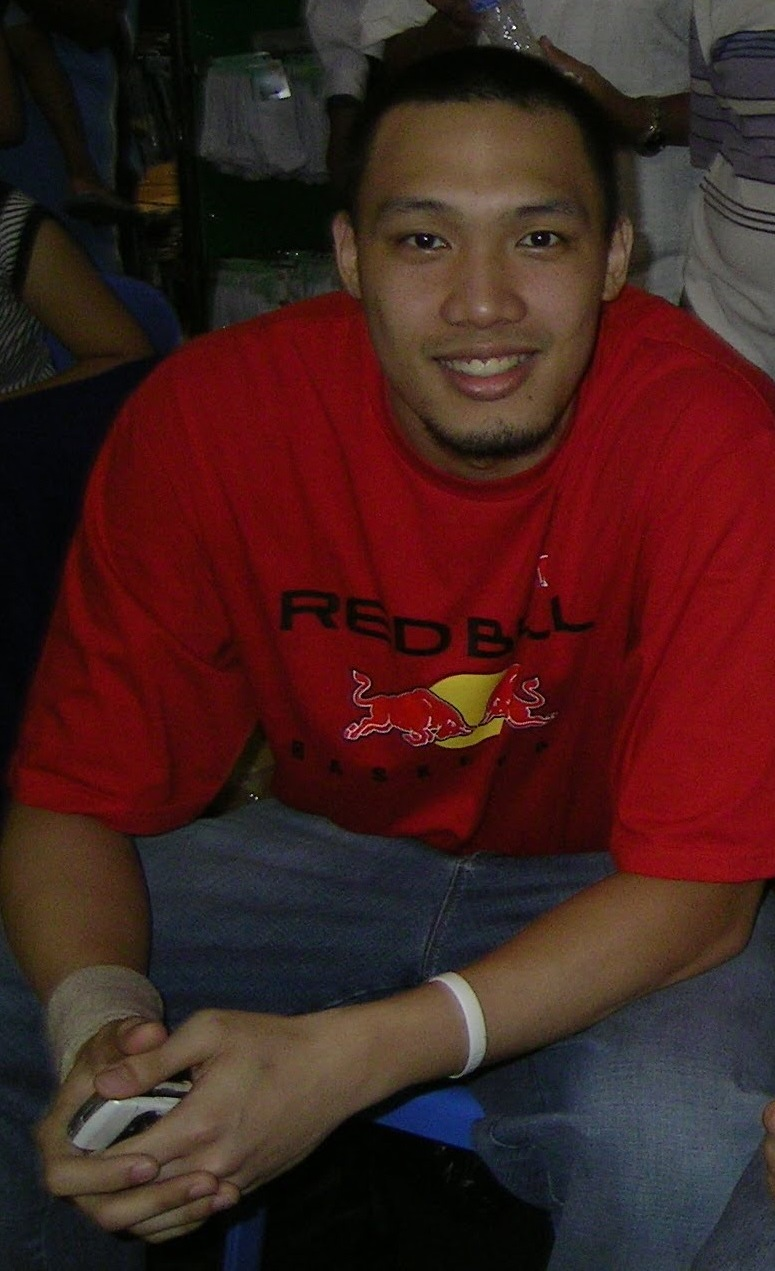
- Bugia in 2007

Phoenix Super LPG Fuel Masters
- Title: Team manager
- League: PBA

Personal information
- Born: January 19, 1981 (age 45)
- Listed height: 6 ft 6 in (1.98 m)
- Listed weight: 215 lb (98 kg)

Career information
- High school: Ateneo (Quezon City)
- College: Ateneo
- PBA draft: 2005: 2nd round, 17th overall pick
- Drafted by: Red Bull Barako
- Playing career: 2005–2015
- Position: Center
- Number: 21

Career history
- 2005–2008: Red Bull Barako
- 2008–2009: Purefoods Tender Juicy Giants
- 2011–2015: Alaska Aces

Career highlights
- 2× PBA champion (2005–06 Fiesta, 2013 Commissioner's); PBA All-Rookie Team (2006)

Ramon Paolo Vlajar Bugia (born January 19, 1981) is a Filipino former professional basketball player and executive who currently serves as the team manager for the Phoenix Super LPG Fuel Masters of the Philippine Basketball Association (PBA). He was drafted seventeenth overall by the Red Bull Barako in the 2005 PBA draft.

In February 2016, Bugia was appointed as the team manager for the newly formed PBA team Phoenix Fuel Masters.

== College career ==
Bugia played for the Ateneo de Manila University, where he was a member of the college basketball team, the Blue Eagles. While at Ateneo, he became teammates with former UAAP MVP and future PBA teammate Rich Alvarez. He finished with a master's degree at business administration

In his final year in 2004 (Season 67), he was named part of the UAAP Men's Basketball Mythical 5 team.

== Professional career ==
Bugia was drafted seventh overall by Red Bull in the 2005 PBA draft.

Bugia was waived by Red Bull, but was picked up and signed by Purefoods Tender Juicy Giants.

In August 2009, Bugia was traded by Purefoods to Barangay Ginebra Kings. Barangay Ginebra traded Paul Artadi, Rafi Reavis, and the rights to 2009 8th pick overall Chris Timberlake for Enrico Villanueva, Rich Alvarez, Celino Cruz, and Paolo Bugia of Purefoods. Burger King acted as the conduit team, trading Pocholo Villanueva to Ginebra and acquiring the rights to 2009 Rookie draft eighteenth pick Orlando Daroya and future picks. However, he did not play a single game with them.

He was signed by the Rain or Shine Elasto Painters during the off-season after being released by Ginebra. He played one conference with the Elasto Painters.

On January 20, he along with Sol Mercado were traded by Rain or Shine to the Meralco Bolts in exchange for Beau Belga as part of a three team deal that involved Meralco, Rain or Shine and Air21. However, he along with Hans Thiele were traded to the Alaska Aces for Reynel Hugnatan.

== Career statistics ==
Legend
GP	Games played	MPG	Minutes per game
FG%	Field-goal percentage	3P%	3-point field-goal percentage	FT%	Free-throw percentage
RPG	Rebounds per game	APG	Assists per game	SPG	Steals per game
BPG	Blocks per game	PPG	Points per game	**Bold**	Career high

=== Season-by-season averages ===
Year	Team	GP	MPG	FG%	3P%	FT%	RPG	APG	SPG	BPG	PPG
2005–06	Red Bull	**61**	12.6	.426	—	.482	2.6	**.7**	.1	.3	4.1
2006–07	Red Bull	47	11.2	.315	—	.625	2.0	.3	.1	.3	3.0
2007–08	Red Bull	33	**15.8**	.393	**.286**	.408	**2.9**	.6	**.2**	.2	**4.2**
2008–09	Purefoods	12	8.5	.441	.250	.571	1.8	—	.1	.2	2.9
2010–11	Alaska	15	5.6	.371	—	.500	1.1	.3	—	**.5**	2.0
2011–12	Alaska	13	6.9	.452	—	.571	1.2	.2	—	—	2.5
2012–13	Alaska	4	3.8	**.500**	—	.500	.8	.3	—	—	1.3
2013–14	Alaska	2	5.0	.286	—	—	2.0	—	—	—	2.0
2014–15	Alaska	6	7.5	.357	—	**.750**	2.0	.2	—	—	2.2
Career		193	11.2	.388	.273	.509	2.2	.4	.1	.2	3.3

== Post-playing career ==
In 2016, Bugia was appointed as the team manager for the new PBA team Phoenix Fuel Masters.
