= Alex Cabagnot =

Filipino basketball player (born 1982)

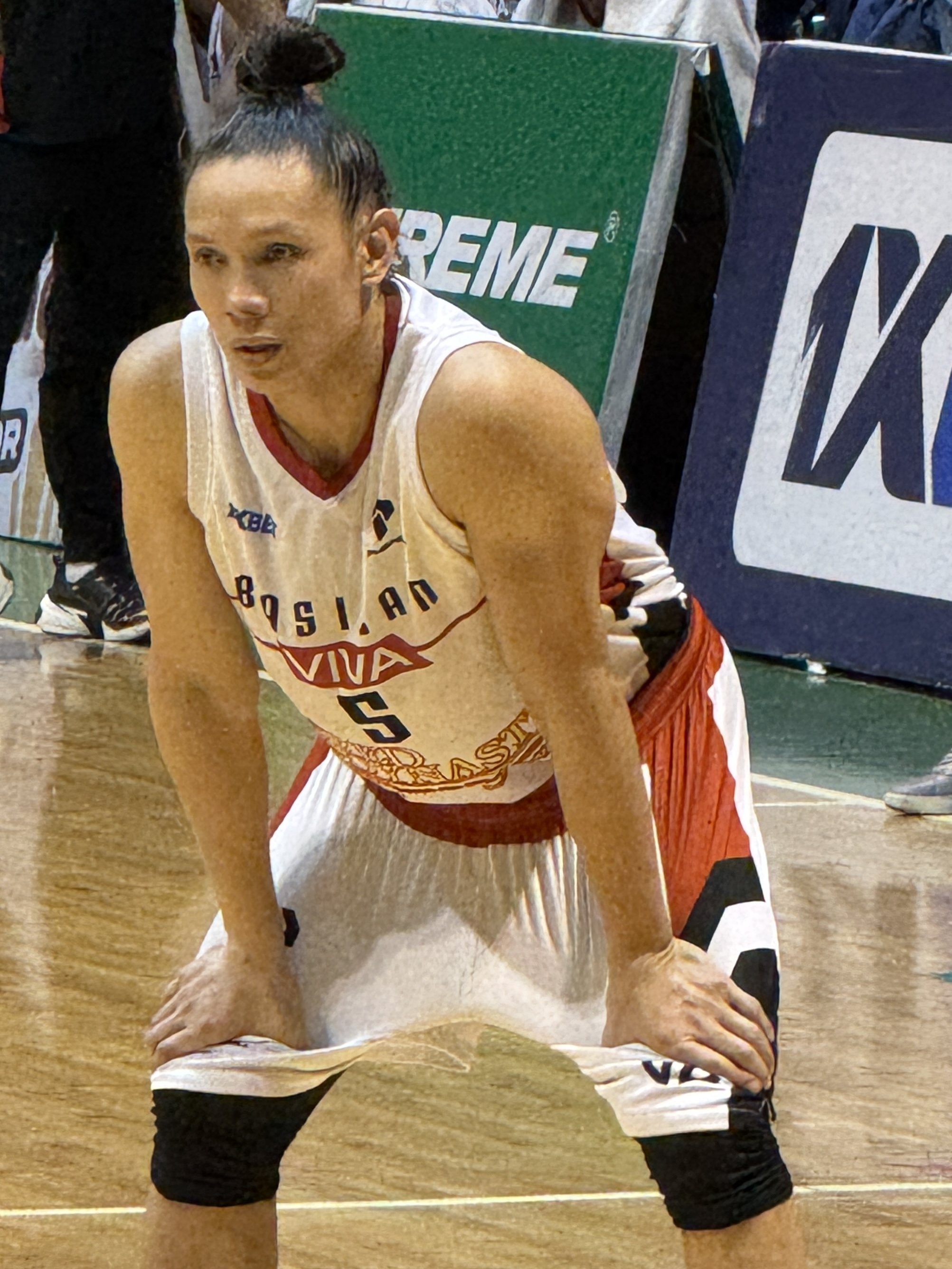
- Cabagnot with the Basilan Viva Portmasters in 2025

No. 5 – Ilagan Isabela Cowboys
- Position: Point guard / shooting guard
- League: MPBL

Personal information
- Born: December 8, 1982 (age 43) Quezon City, Philippines
- Listed height: 6 ft 0 in (1.83 m)
- Listed weight: 180 lb (82 kg)

Career information
- High school: Eagle Rock (Los Angeles, California)
- College: Los Angeles Valley College (2001–2003); Hawaii-Hilo (2003–2005)
- PBA draft: 2005: 1st round, 2nd overall pick
- Drafted by: Sta. Lucia Realtors
- Playing career: 2005–present
- Number: 5, 10, 55
- Coaching career: 2016–present

Career history

Playing
- 2005–2007: Sta. Lucia Realtors
- 2007–2009: Coca-Cola Tigers
- 2009–2010: Burger King Whoppers
- 2010–2014: San Miguel Beermen / Petron Blaze Boosters
- 2014: GlobalPort Batang Pier
- 2014–2021: San Miguel Beermen
- 2021–2023: Terrafirma Dyip
- 2023–2024: Goyang Sono Skygunners
- 2024–2025: Converge FiberXers
- 2025: Basilan Viva Portmasters/Starhorse
- 2026-present: Ilagan Isabela Cowboys

Coaching
- 2016–2019: UP Fighting Maroons (skills coach)
- 2024: Bacolod City of Smiles
- 2025–present: UE Red Warriors (assistant)

Career highlights
- 9× PBA champion (2011 Governors', 2014–15 Philippine, 2015 Governors', 2015–16 Philippine, 2016–17 Philippine, 2017 Commissioner's, 2017–18 Philippine, 2019 Philippine, 2019 Commissioner's); PBA Finals MVP (2017 Commissioner's); 8x PBA All-Star (2011–2013, 2016–2019, 2023); PBA All-Star Game MVP (2016); PBA Mythical First Team (2017); 2× PBA Mythical Second Team (2013, 2016); PBA Comeback Player of the Year (2015); PBA Obstacle Challenge Co-Champion (2007)

Alexander Cabagnot Jr. (born December 8, 1982) is a Filipino professional basketball player for the Ilagan Isabela Cowboys of the Maharlika Pilipinas Basketball League (MPBL) and assistant coach for the UE Red Warriors of the University Athletic Association of the Philippines (UAAP). He played for Sta. Lucia, Coca-Cola, Burger King, San Miguel/Petron, GlobalPort, Terrafirma and Converge as well as the Philippine national basketball team. He plays the point guard and shooting guard positions. He once had a rivalry with Mark Caguioa for the Eagle Rock High School scoring record.

== Professional career ==
=== Sta. Lucia Realtors (2005–2007) ===
Cabagnot was drafted by the Sta. Lucia Realtors. He led all rookies during his rookie year in scoring (10.3 points per game), assists (4.7), steals (1.1) and minutes played (28.1). He was third in the league in the assist-to-turnover ratio (2.5) behind Jimmy Alapag and Johnny Abarrientos.

=== Coca-Cola Tigers (2007–2010) ===
After playing 2 seasons he was dealt to the Coca-Cola Tigers along with the aging Kenneth Duremdes and Ricky Calimag in exchange for Denok Miranda, Manny Ramos and Coca-Cola's 2007 second-round draft pick.

=== Burger King Whoppers (2010) ===
On January 5, 2010, he was traded to the Burger King Whoppers along with Wesley Gonzales, for Gary David and Chico Lanete. He played several games with Burger King, finishing at the 8th spot of the 2009-10 PBA Philippine Cup.

=== San Miguel Beermen (2010–2014) ===
During the off-season of the 2009–2010 Fiesta Conference, he was traded to the San Miguel Beermen, for Mike Cortez.

As a Beermen, Cabagnot quickly emerged as the starting quarterback for the team. Cabagnot dropped game winning shots during eliminations earning his nickname "The Crunchman". He did it on Alaska Aces, B-Meg Derby Ace Llmados scoring a basket on crucial possession. During game 1 of the 2010–2011 PBA Philippine Cup semifinals series against the crowd favorite Ginebra Gin Kings, Alex made a clutch basket leaving the Gin Kings with only over a second. This nailed the series to a 1–0 lead in favor of the Beermen. SMB eventually won the duel in six games 4–2. In 2011, Cabagnot together with Arwind Santos and Danny Ildefonso lead Petron Blaze Boosters to a Governor's Cup title by hacking out a 4–3 decider in 7 games, thus foiling the Grand Slam bid of Talk N Text & captured his first PBA crown as a player.

=== GlobalPort Batang Pier (2014) ===
On February 18, 2014, he was part of a complex four-team, seven player trade which sent him to GlobalPort. With his new team, he reunites with old teammate Jay Washington and provided veteran leadership. He said, "(The trade) came a little bit as an 'I-didn't-see-it-coming,' but when it did sink in, I just have to be a pro, go to the next team and try to do what I did with Petron and my other teams before". On June 11, 2014, Cabagnot almost recorded a triple-double for GlobalPort Batang Piers as he racked up 19 points, 8 rebounds and 10 assists but in a losing effort to the Air21 Express.

On October 26, 2014, Cabagnot recorded 21 points, 10 rebounds and 3 assists in a win over the Barako Bull Energy Boosters.

=== Return to the Beermen (2014–2021) ===
During the playoffs of the 2014–15 PBA Philippine Cup, Alex Cabagnot was traded back to San Miguel for Sol Mercado.

On October 14, 2016, Cabagnot was recognized during the PBA Leo Awards Night as he was named to the PBA Mythcial Second Team.

On June 21, 2019, during the 2019 Commissioner's Cup, Cabagnot scored a conference-high 31 points to go along with 4 rebounds and 6 assists in a win over the Alaska Aces. He led the Beermen in a much-needed win as they now have a record of 2–3 for the conference.

=== Terrafirma Dyip (2021–2023) ===
On November 13, 2021, he was traded to the Terrafirma Dyip for Simon Enciso. On December 18, he suffered a torn achilles tendon during a game against the NLEX Road Warriors which ended his season.

On April 14, 2022, he signed a two-year contract extension with Terrafirma. On October 19, 2023, he became an unrestricted free agent after being released by the team.

=== Goyang Sono Skygunners (2023–2024) ===
On December 18, 2023, he signed with the Goyang Sono Skygunners of the Korean Basketball League, replacing Joshua Torralba as the team's Asian import.

=== Converge FiberXers (2024–2025) ===
On August 5, 2024, Cabagnot returns to the PBA where he signed with the Converge FiberXers.

On February 24, 2025, Cabagnot retired from the PBA and he became the assistant coach of the UE Red Warriors.

=== Basilan Viva Portmasters / Starhorse (2025) ===
"The Crunchman" played for the Basilan Viva Portmasters.

== PBA career statistics ==
Legend
GP	Games played	MPG	Minutes per game	FG%	Field-goal percentage
3FG%	3-point field-goal percentage	4P%	4-point field-goal percentage	FT%	Free-throw percentage
RPG	Rebounds per game	APG	Assists per game	SPG	Steals per game
BPG	Blocks per game	PPG	Points per game	127	Career high

=== Season-by-season averages ===
Year	Team	GP	MPG	FG%	3P%	4P%	FT%	RPG	APG	SPG	BPG	PPG
2005–06	Sta. Lucia	35	28.1	.349	.266	—	.681	3.3	4.7	1.1	.3	10.3
2006–07	Sta. Lucia	45	33.3	.424	.322	—	.703	3.5	6.4	1.3	.2	10.9
2006–07	Coca-Cola	45	33.3	.424	.322	—	.703	3.5	6.4	1.3	.2	10.9
2007–08	Coca-Cola	37	33.8	.343	.360	—	.667	3.0	4.6	1.1	.2	11.0
2008–09	Coca-Cola	32	37.0	.356	.240	—	.667	3.6	5.3	1.4	.4	10.8
2009–10	Coca-Cola	50	23.0	.376	.250	—	.693	3.6	5.5	1.0	.3	10.2
2009–10	Burger King	50	23.0	.376	.250	—	.693	3.6	5.5	1.0	.3	10.2
2009–10	San Miguel	50	23.0	.376	.250	—	.693	3.6	5.5	1.0	.3	10.2
2010–11	San Miguel / Petron	54	30.2	.395	.321	—	.728	4.2	5.8	1.0	.4	9.7
2011–12	Petron	46	35.5	.390	.383	—	.745	3.6	6.2	1.1	.3	13.4
2012–13	Petron	47	32.2	.407	.321	—	.747	3.7	5.1	1.2	.2	11.9
2013–14	Petron	34	35.6	.378	.311	—	.696	4.4	6.2	1.3	.2	13.1
2013–14	GlobalPort	34	35.6	.378	.311	—	.696	4.4	6.2	1.3	.2	13.1
2014–15	GlobalPort	52	29.5	.366	.350	—	.705	4.5	4.7	.8	.1	11.1
2014–15	San Miguel	52	29.5	.366	.350	—	.705	4.5	4.7	.8	.1	11.1
2015–16	San Miguel	56	32.5	.404	.342	—	.745	3.6	4.0	1.0	.1	14.3
2016–17	San Miguel	56	35.8	.386	.339	—	.765	5.5	4.5	1.3	.1	16.2
2017–18	San Miguel	51	34.0	.375	.276	—	.795	4.6	5.4	1.3	.1	13.8
2019	San Miguel	56	29.9	.383	.325	—	.790	3.3	3.7	1.2	.1	13.3
2020	San Miguel	12	29.6	.401	.250	—	.711	3.8	3.8	.8	.0	12.6
2021	San Miguel	17	23.9	.390	.208	—	.743	3.3	3.0	.4	.0	10.5
2021	Terrafirma	17	23.9	.390	.208	—	.743	3.3	3.0	.4	.0	10.5
2022–23	Terrafirma	20	25.1	.306	.250	—	.667	3.6	4.9	.5	.1	8.0
2024–25	Converge	18	11.7	.370	.381	.000	.917	1.7	1.9	.4	.1	3.3
Career		718	31.1	.381	.318	.000	.729	3.8	4.9	1.1	.2	11.9

== International career statistics ==
Legend
GP	Games played	MPG	Minutes per game
FG%	Field-goal percentage	3P%	3-point field-goal percentage	FT%	Free-throw percentage
RPG	Rebounds per game	APG	Assists per game	SPG	Steals per game
BPG	Blocks per game	PPG	Points per game	**Bold**	Career high

As of the end of 2023–24 season

=== Korean Basketball League (KBL) ===
Year	Team	GP	MPG	FG%	3P%	FT%	RPG	APG	SPG	BPG	PPG
2023–24	Goyang	11	9.5	.314	.286	.889	.7	1.3	.2	.0	4.0
Career		11	9.5	.314	.286	.889	.7	1.3	.2	.0	4.0

== Off the court ==
In December 2019, Cabagnot, along with his cousin Cris Gopez, established Fil-Am Nation Select, a program where young players with Filipino lineage can know more about Philippine basketball in the hope of bringing them over to play in leagues or even with Gilas Pilipinas. Aside from basketball, they have expanded the program to include volleyball, football, ice hockey, and baseball. Among the basketball players Fil-Am Nation has handled include college standout Zavier Lucero and pro Sedrick Barefield.

Cabagnot and Gopez also handle a basketball recreation league, Edge Basketball International, that boasts Atlanta Hawks draftee Onyeka Okongwu as one of its former players.
