= Denok Miranda =

Filipino basketball player (born 1982)

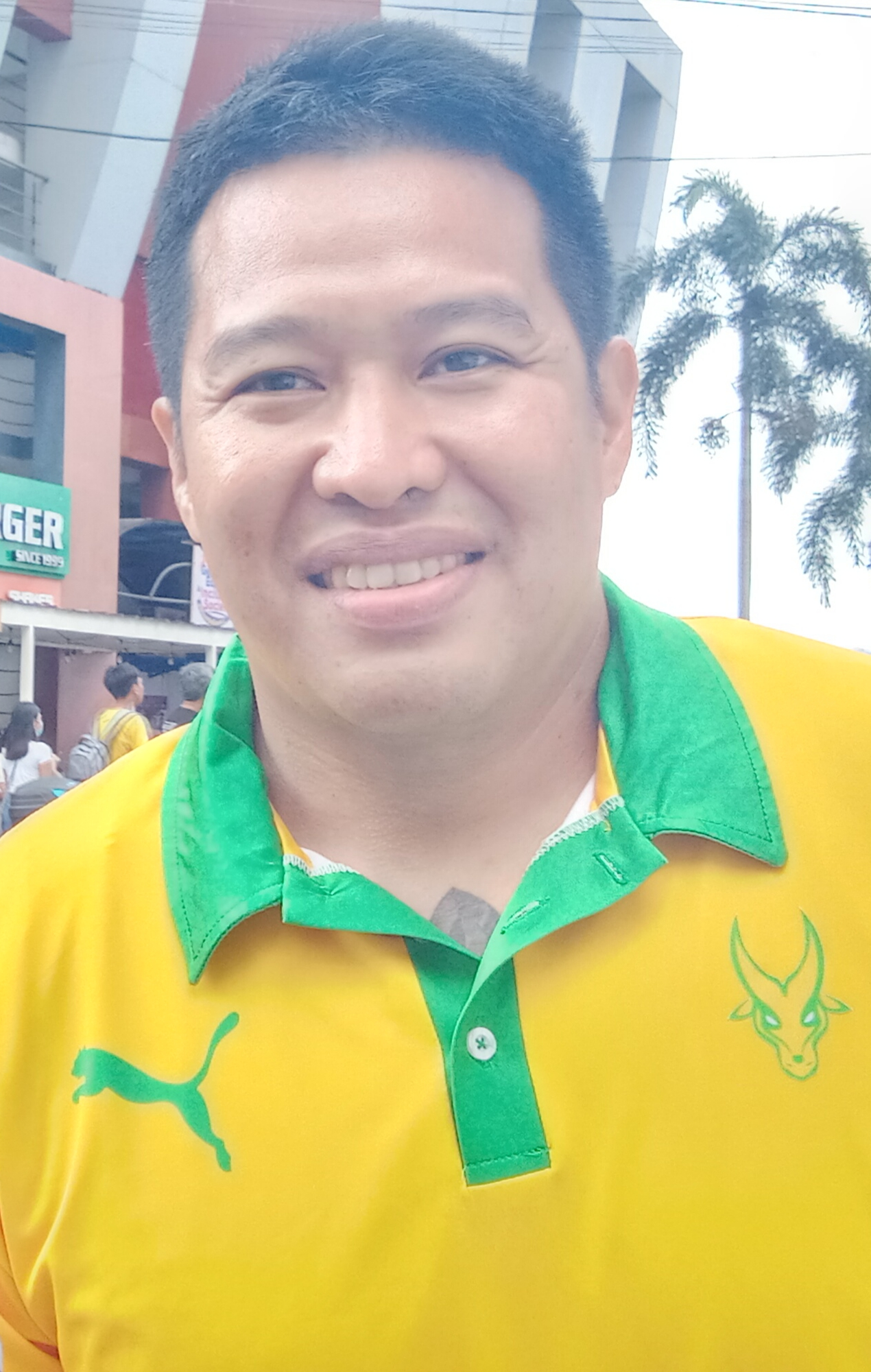
- Miranda in 2023

NU Bulldogs
- Title: Assistant coach
- League: UAAP

Personal information
- Born: July 14, 1982 (age 44) Lopez, Quezon, Philippines
- Listed height: 5 ft 11 in (1.80 m)
- Listed weight: 195 lb (88 kg)

Career information
- High school: Letran (Manila)
- College: FEU
- PBA draft: 2005: 1st round, 3rd overall pick
- Drafted by: Coca-Cola Tigers
- Playing career: 2005–2020
- Position: Point guard / shooting guard
- Coaching career: 2019–present

Career history

Playing
- 2005–2007: Coca-Cola Tigers
- 2007–2009: Sta. Lucia Realtors
- 2009–2013: San Miguel Beermen / Petron Blaze Boosters
- 2013–2014: Barako Bull Energy Cola
- 2015: GlobalPort Batang Pier
- 2015–2016: Talk 'N Text Tropang Texters / TNT Tropang Texters / Tropang TNT
- 2016–2017: Blackwater Elite
- 2018–2020: Laguna Heroes

Coaching
- 2019–2022: FEU (assistant)
- 2019–2020: Biñan City Luxxe White
- 2023–2024: FEU
- 2024–present: Abra Solid North Weavers (assistant)
- 2024–2025: FEU-D HS
- 2025–present: NU (assistant)

Career highlights
- As player: 2× PBA champion (2007–08 Philippine, 2011 Governors'); PBA All-Rookie Team (2006); PBA Obstacle Challenge Co-champion (2007); PBA Trick Shot Challenge champion (2007); 2× UAAP champion (2003, 2004); As assistant coach: MPBL champion (2025)

Dennis Ellera "Denok" Miranda (born July 14, 1982), is a Filipino professional basketball coach and former player. He is the assistant coach for the NU Bulldogs of the University Athletic Association of the Philippines (UAAP) and Abra Weavers of the Maharlika Pilipinas Basketball League (MPBL). He played majority of his career in the Philippine Basketball Association (PBA). He was drafted third overall by Coca-Cola Tigers during the 2005 PBA draft.

== PBA career ==
=== Coca-Cola Tigers ===
Miranda played for the Coca-Cola Tigers for two seasons and averaged 8.1 points per game, 4.1 rebounds per game, and 4.4 assists per game.

=== Sta. Lucia Realtors ===
In the 2006–07 Philippine Cup, Miranda was traded to the Sta. Lucia Realtors with Manny Ramos and the Coca-Cola Tigers' 2008 second-round pick in exchange for Alex Cabagnot, Ricky Calimag, and Kenneth Duremdes. He, Paolo Mendoza, Joseph Yeo and Ryan Reyes shared minutes at the guards positions. He was one of the key players in the championship team that defeated Purefoods in 2007–08.

=== San Miguel Beermen/Petron Blaze Boosters ===
Before the start of the 2009–10 PBA season, he was traded to the San Miguel Beermen for Sta. Lucia's future draft picks.

=== GlobalPort Batang Pier ===
He was traded to the GlobalPort Batang Pier for Chris Ross. However, he never played for GlobalPort in the 2013–14 season, so he was reacquired by Barako Bull.

=== Barako Bull ===
Miranda was traded by GlobalPort to the Barako Bull Energy in exchange for the sixth pick in the 2013 PBA draft, RR Garcia, who would later play with him for Barako.

=== Second coming to GlobalPort ===
He was traded by Barako Bull along with a 2016 second-round pick, this time to GlobalPort which gave up Sol Mercado.

=== Talk 'N Text Tropang Texters ===
Miranda was traded to Talk 'N Text Tropang Texters for Jay Washington. He was later released by the newly named TNT KaTropa.

=== Blackwater Elite ===
Miranda signed with the Blackwater Elite for a short-term contract during the 2016 Governors' Cup.

== PBA career statistics ==
Legend
GP	Games played	MPG	Minutes per game
FG%	Field-goal percentage	3P%	3-point field-goal percentage	FT%	Free-throw percentage
RPG	Rebounds per game	APG	Assists per game	SPG	Steals per game
BPG	Blocks per game	PPG	Points per game	**Bold**	Career high

Correct as of September 18, 2016

=== Season-by-season averages ===
Year	Team	GP	MPG	FG%	3P%	FT%	RPG	APG	SPG	BPG	PPG
2005–06	Coca-Cola	34	27.7	.414	.188	.593	3.0	3.2	.9	.1	7.3
2006–07	Coca-Cola / Sta. Lucia	41	**30.7**	.430	.216	.614	**4.1**	**4.4**	.8	**.2**	8.2
2007–08	Sta. Lucia	**54**	29.8	.425	.222	.657	3.4	**4.4**	**1.2**	.0	7.1
2008–09	Sta. Lucia	45	**30.7**	.439	.323	.600	3.2	**4.4**	.4	**.2**	7.3
2009–10	San Miguel	49	15.4	.409	.263	.662	1.8	2.3	.4	.0	5.1
2010–11	San Miguel	47	15.0	.463	.233	.637	1.9	1.9	.3	.0	5.6
2011–12	Petron	43	23.4	.475	.262	.674	2.8	3.1	.7	.0	8.4
2012–13	Petron	39	17.0	**.481**	**.348**	.631	2.2	2.9	.5	.0	6.0
2013–14	Barako Bull	29	26.7	.358	.309	**.739**	3.1	3.6	.3	.0	**9.5**
2014–15	Barako Bull / GlobalPort	34	19.6	.404	.275	.714	2.0	2.1	.7	**.2**	7.3
2015–16	TNT / Blackwater	20	14.2	.366	.217	.682	1.6	1.9	.4	.1	4.0
Career		435	23.1	.428	.270	.650	2.7	3.2	.6	.1	6.9

== Coaching record ==
=== Collegiate record ===
Season	Team	Elimination round					Playoffs				
Season	Team	GP	W	L	PCT	Finish	GP	W	L	PCT	Results
2023	FEU	14	3	11	.214	7th	—	—	—	—	Eliminated
Totals		14	3	11	.214		0	0	0	.000	0 championships
