= 2005–06 PBA season =

31st PBA season

- Duration: October 2, 2005 – July 21, 2006
- Teams: 9
- TV partner(s): Local: ABC; International: The Filipino Channel

2005 PBA Draft
- Top draft pick: Jay Washington
- Picked by: Air21 Express
- Season MVP: James Yap (Purefoods Chunkee Giants)
- Fiesta Conference champions: Red Bull Barako
- Fiesta Conference runners-up: Purefoods Chunkee Giants
- Philippine Cup champions: Purefoods Chunkee Giants
- Philippine Cup runners-up: Red Bull Barako

Seasons
- ← 2004–05 2006–07 →

The 2005–06 PBA season was the 31st season of the Philippine Basketball Association. It began on October 2, 2005, and ended on July 21, 2006. The season had two conferences played, the import-laiden 2005–06 San Mig Coffee Fiesta Conference and the season-ending 2006 Gran Matador Brandy Philippine Cup.

== Opening ceremonies ==
The muses for the participating teams are as follows:

Team	Muse
Air21 Express	Bianca King
Alaska Aces	Kyla
Barangay Ginebra Kings	Gabriela Leguia
Coca-Cola Tigers	Nikki Gil
Purefoods Chunkee Giants	Kelly Misa
Red Bull Barako	Dana Gajtandzievova-Leitner
San Miguel Beermen	Jenny Hernandez
Sta. Lucia Realtors	Maan Biot
Talk 'N Text Phone Pals	Kristine Hermosa

== 2005–06 Fiesta Conference ==
Red Bull Barako won the 2005–06 Fiesta Conference defeating the Purefoods Chunkee Giants in six games. The Air21 Express defeated Barangay Ginebra Kings to capture third place in a one-game playoff.

Enrico Villanueva of Red Bull won the Best Player of the Conference honors while Purefoods' import Marquin Chandler won the Best Import Award. The league introduced a Give Me 5 Promo, in which tickets for Upper Box B and General Admission seats would cost only five pesos. The marketing scheme paid off as the league had multiple soldout games during the conference.

In the 2005 PBA All-Star Game held in Laoag City, Ilocos Norte on November 26, 2005, the North All-Stars defeated the South All-Stars. Ginebra's Jayjay Helterbrand won the All-Star Game MVP honors.

=== Classification round ===
Pos	Team	W	L	PCT	GB	Qualification
1	Purefoods Chunkee Giants	10	6	.625	—	Advance to semifinals
2	Barangay Ginebra Kings	9	7	.563 (Note: Head-to-head differential: Red Bull +31, Barangay Ginebra +4, Air21 −7, Talk 'N Text −28; fifth-seed playoff: Talk 'N Text 101–91 Air21; second-seed playoff: Barangay Ginebra 109–102 Red Bull)	1	Advance to semifinals
3	Red Bull Barako	9	7	.563	1	Advance to quarterfinals
4	Talk 'N Text Phone Pals	9	7	.563	1	Advance to quarterfinals
5	Air21 Express	9	7	.563	1	Advance to wildcard phase
6	Alaska Aces	7	9	.438 (Note: Head-to-head differential: Alaska +9, Sta. Lucia −9)	3	Advance to wildcard phase
7	Sta. Lucia Realtors	7	9	.438	3	Advance to wildcard phase
8	San Miguel Beermen	6	10	.375 (Note: Head-to-head differential: San Miguel +12, Coca-Cola −12)	4	Twice-to-beat in survivor playoffs
9	Coca-Cola Tigers	6	10	.375	4	Twice-to-win in survivor playoffs

Source: PBA.ph

=== Playoffs ===
Survivor playoffs (#8 twice-to-beat)
8	San Miguel	82	69
9	Coca-Cola	85*	67

Wildcard playoffs (Best-of-3)
6	Alaska	2
7	Sta. Lucia	0
5	Air21	2
8	San Miguel	1

Quarterfinals (Best-of-5)
3	Red Bull	3
6	Alaska	0
4	Talk 'N Text	2
5	Air21	3

Semifinals (Best-of-7)
2	Barangay Ginebra	3
3	Red Bull	4
1	Purefoods	4
5	Air21	2

Finals (Best-of-7)
3	Red Bull	4
1	Purefoods	2
Third-place playoff
2	Barangay Ginebra	98
5	Air21	108

*Overtime

==== Survivor playoffs ====
Team 1	Series	Team 2	Game 1	Game 2
(8) San Miguel Beermen*	1–1	(9) Coca-Cola Tigers	82–85 (OT)	69–67

*Team has twice-to-beat advantage. Team 1 only has to win once, while Team 2 has to win twice.

==== Wildcard playoffs ====
Team 1	Series	Team 2	Game 1	Game 2	Game 3
(5) Air21 Express	2–1	(8) San Miguel Beermen	97–88	103–104	100–86
(6) Alaska Aces	2–0	(7) Sta. Lucia Realtors	108–104	95–90	—

==== Quarterfinals ====
Team 1	Series	Team 2	Game 1	Game 2	Game 3	Game 4	Game 5
(3) Red Bull Barako	3–0	(6) Alaska Aces	100–92	80–73	81–65	—	—
(4) Talk 'N Text Phone Pals	2–3	(5) Air21 Express	111–109	87–90	93–98	99–89	110–117 (OT)

==== Semifinals ====
Team 1	Series	Team 2	Game 1	Game 2	Game 3	Game 4	Game 5	Game 6	Game 7
(1) Purefoods Chunkee Giants	4–3	(5) Air21 Express	94–89	88–87	87–101	100–90	99–100	100–79	—
(2) Barangay Ginebra Kings	4–3	(3) Red Bull Barako	105–100 (OT)	83–86	85–93	85–88	97–83	85–77	79–83

==== Third place playoff ====
Team 1	Score	Team 2
(2) Barangay Ginebra Kings	98–108	(5) Air21 Express

==== Finals ====
Team 1	Series	Team 2	Game 1	Game 2	Game 3	Game 4	Game 5	Game 6	Game 7
(1) Purefoods Chunkee Giants	2–4	(3) Red Bull Barako	102–107 (OT)	84–98	103–97	96–91	86–91	73–83	—

- Finals MVP: Lordy Tugade (Red Bull)
- Best Player of the Conference: Enrico Villanueva (Red Bull)
- Best Import Award: Marquin Chandler (Purefoods)

== 2006 Philippine Cup ==
The Purefoods Chunkee Giants defeated the Red Bull Barako, 4–2, in their best-of-seven finals series to win the Philippine Cup. On the third place playoff, the Alaska Aces defeated the San Miguel Beermen.

The South All-Stars defeated the North All-Stars 122–120 in the All-Star Game held in Cagayan de Oro on April 29, 2006. Asi Taulava was named as the All-Star Game MVP.

On May 14, 2006, an incident occurred when Purefoods' Eugene Tejada suffered a career-threatening injury against Red Bull, suffering extensive neck and spinal cord injuries.

=== Classification round ===
Pos	Team	W	L	PCT	GB	Qualification
1	Purefoods Chunkee Giants	12	4	.750	—	Advance to semifinals
2	San Miguel Beermen	11	5	.688	1	Advance to semifinals
3	Red Bull Barako	9	7	.563 (Note: Head-to-head differential: Red Bull +11, Alaska −11)	3	Advance to quarterfinals
4	Alaska Aces	9	7	.563	3	Advance to quarterfinals
5	Coca-Cola Tigers	7	9	.438 (Note: Head-to-head differential: Air21 +16, Coca-Cola +10, Barangay Ginebra − 26; fifth-seed playoff: Coca-Coca 87–73 Air21)	5	Advance to quarterfinals
6	Air21 Express	7	9	.438	5	Advance to wildcard phase
7	Barangay Ginebra Kings	7	9	.438	5	Advance to wildcard phase
8	Talk 'N Text Phone Pals	6	10	.375	6	Advance to wildcard phase
9	Sta. Lucia Realtors	4	12	.250	8	Advance to wildcard phase

Source: [www.pba.ph PBA.ph]

=== Wildcard round ===
Overall standings
Pos	Team	W	L	PCT	GB	Qualification
6	Barangay Ginebra Kings	10	9	.526	—	Quarterfinals
7	Air21 Express	9	10	.474	1	
8	Talk 'N Text Phone Pals	6	13	.316	4	
9	Sta. Lucia Realtors	5	14	.263	5	

Source: PBA.ph

Wildcard phase standings
Pos	Team	W	L
6	Barangay Ginebra Kings	3	0
7	Air21 Express	2	1
8	Sta. Lucia Realtors	1	2
9	Talk 'N Text Phone Pals	0	3

Source: PBA.ph

=== Playoffs ===
Quarterfinals (Best-of-5)
4	Alaska	3
5	Coca-Cola	1
3	Red Bull	3
7	Barangay Ginebra	2

Semifinals (Best-of-7)
1	Purefoods	4
4	Alaska	3
2	San Miguel	3
3	Red Bull	4

Finals (Best-of-7)
1	Purefoods	4
3	Red Bull	2
Third place playoff
4	Alaska	102
2	San Miguel	95

==== Quarterfinals ====
Team 1	Series	Team 2	Game 1	Game 2	Game 3	Game 4	Game 5
(3) Red Bull Barako	3–2	(7) Barangay Ginebra Kings	95–86	103–112	85–97	118–97	120–98
(4) Alaska Aces	3–1	(5) Coca-Cola Tigers	95–94	81–75	75–77	94–69	—

==== Semifinals ====
Team 1	Series	Team 2	Game 1	Game 2	Game 3	Game 4	Game 5	Game 6	Game 7
(1) Purefoods Chunkee Giants	4–3	(4) Alaska Aces	92–94	77–86	82–79	77–99	85–74	99–96	90–89
(2) San Miguel Beermen	3–4	(3) Red Bull Barako	78–94	114–98	95–99	106–82	101–107	116–101	84–86

==== Third place playoff ====
Team 1	Score	Team 2
(2) San Miguel Beermen	95–102	(4) Alaska Aces

==== Finals ====
Team 1	Series	Team 2	Game 1	Game 2	Game 3	Game 4	Game 5	Game 6	Game 7
(1) Purefoods Chunkee Giants	4–2	(3) Red Bull Barako	101–97	93–82	79–89	99–81	93–98	90–83	—

- Finals MVP: Marc Pingris (Purefoods)
- Best Player of the Conference: Danny Seigle (San Miguel)

== Cumulative standings ==
=== Overall standings ===
Pos	Team	Pld	W	L	PCT	Best finish
1	Purefoods Chunkee Giants	57	36	21	.632	Champions
2	Red Bull Barako	67	38	29	.567	Champions
3	Barangay Ginebra Kings	49	25	24	.510	Semifinalist
4	Air21 Express	52	26	26	.500	Third place
5	Alaska Aces	48	24	24	.500	Third place
6	San Miguel Beermen	44	22	22	.500	Semifinalist
7	Talk 'N Text Phone Pals	41	18	23	.439	Quarterfinalist
8	Coca-Cola Tigers	39	16	23	.410	Quarterfinalist
9	Sta. Lucia Realtors	37	12	25	.324	Wildcard phase

=== Classification rounds ===
Pos	Team	Pld	W	L	PCT
1	Purefoods Chunkee Giants	32	22	10	.688
2	Red Bull Barako	32	18	14	.563
3	San Miguel Beermen	32	17	15	.531
4	Air21 Express	32	16	16	.500
5	Alaska Aces	32	16	16	.500
6	Barangay Ginebra Kings	32	16	16	.500
7	Talk 'N Text Phone Pals	32	15	17	.469
8	Coca-Cola Tigers	32	13	19	.406
9	Sta. Lucia Realtors	32	11	21	.344

=== Playoffs ===
Pos	Team	Pld	W	L
1	Red Bull Barako	35	20	15
2	Purefoods Chunkee Giants	25	14	11
3	Air21 Express	20	10	10
4	Barangay Ginebra Kings	17	9	8
5	Alaska Aces	16	8	8
6	San Miguel Beermen	12	5	7
7	Talk 'N Text Phone Pals	9	3	6
8	Coca-Cola Tigers	7	3	4
9	Sta. Lucia Realtors	5	1	4

== Awards ==
- Most Valuable Player: James Yap (Purefoods)
- Rookie of the Year: Larry Fonacier (Red Bull)
- Most Improved Player: Marc Pingris (Purefoods)
- Mythical Five:
  - Kerby Raymundo (Purefoods)
  - James Yap (Purefoods)
  - Roger Yap (Purefoods)
  - Enrico Villanueva (Red Bull)
  - Lordy Tugade (Red Bull)
- Mythical Second Team:
  - Mark Caguioa (Barangay Ginebra)
  - Dorian Peña (San Miguel)
  - Danny Seigle (San Miguel)
  - Mike Cortez (Alaska)
  - Marc Pingris (Purefoods)
- All-Defensive Team:
  - Dorian Peña (San Miguel)
  - Marc Pingris (Purefoods)
  - Wynne Arboleda (Air21)
  - Topex Robinson (Red Bull)
  - Nic Belasco (Alaska)

=== Awards given by the PBA Press Corps ===
- Coach of the Year: Ryan Gregorio (Purefoods)
- Mr. Quality Minutes: Ronald Tubid (Air21)
- Comeback Player of the Year: Danny Seigle (San Miguel)
- Referee of the Year: Luisito Cruz
- All-Rookie Team
  - Paolo Bugia (Red Bull)
  - Dennis Miranda (Coca-Cola)
  - Leo Najorda (Red Bull)
  - KG Canaleta (Air21)
  - Larry Fonacier (Red Bull)
