= Shawn Daniels (basketball) =

American basketball player (born 1979)

Personal information
- Born: May 14, 1979 (age 47) Bakersfield, California, U.S.
- Listed height: 6 ft 8 in (2.03 m)
- Listed weight: 250 lb (113 kg)

Career information
- High school: Highland (Bakersfield, California)
- College: Bakersfield College (1997–1999); Utah State (1999–2001)
- NBA draft: 2001: undrafted
- Playing career: 2001–2012
- Position: Power forward

Career history
- 2001: Dakota Wizards
- 2002: Dodge City Legend
- 2002–2003: Dakota Wizards
- 2003: Los Mochis Pioneros
- 2003: Tijuana Diablos
- 2003–2004: Las Vegas Rattlers
- 2004–2005: Dakota Wizards
- 2005: Dodge City Legend
- 2005–2006: Air21 Express
- 2006: Sioux Falls Skyforce
- 2006–2007: Bakersfield Jam
- 2008–2009: Lawton-Fort Sill Cavalry
- 2009: Burger King Whoppers
- 2009–2010: Talk 'N Text Tropang Texters
- 2011–2012: London Lighting

Career highlights
- 3× CBA champion (2002, 2008, 2009); CBA Finals MVP (2009)

Shawn James Daniels (born May 14, 1979) is an American former professional basketball player. He played in the Philippine Basketball Association with Air21, Burger King, and Talk 'N Text and last played with the London Lightning basketball team in National Basketball League of Canada.

== High school and college career ==
During his senior campaign, Daniels led Highland High School to a 28–5 record en route to the Valley Championship. His senior averages of 24 points and 13 rebounds had him making the all-league and all-conference selection. He was also a two-time Player of the Year.

As a freshman for Bakersfield Junior College, he averaged 17.6 points and 10.5 rebounds per game. During his sophomore season, he scored more than 20 points thirteen times to garner averages of 17.7 points and 11.7 rebounds. During his 66-game college career, Daniels registered 44 double-doubles and was a two-time all-Western State Conference selection. He averaged 17.7 points on .592 shooting, 11.4 rebounds. 2.8 blocks and 1.7 steals in his two-year career, where he was the second-leading scorer for his team.

Daniels then moved to Utah State of the NCAA Big West Conference, being named the conference's "Newcomer of the Year" by Street & Smith's Basketball Magazine. As a junior, he was a first-team all-Big West selection on averages of 12.0 points on .581 shooting, 7.9 rebounds, 1.7 blocks and 1.3 steals in 34 games. His 58 blocks ties for first on the USU single-season blocks list with Gilbert Pete, and his 267 rebounds were the 20th most. Leading the team in every category except steals, Daniels also led the league in rebounds and double-doubles (7). He was named co-MVP of the three-game Big West Tournament with teammate Troy Rolle, where he averaged 9.7 points, 6.7 rebounds, and 3.0 blocks, and shot 57.1 percent. Daniels was also named Big West Defense Player of the Year while leading the team to the second round of the NCAA Tournament.

== Professional career ==
Daniels has played in various leagues, most notably powering the Air21 franchise of the Philippine Basketball Association to third place in 2005, under former head coach Bo Perasol. In a second tour of duty for the franchise, Daniels towed the team to the quarterfinals with him averaging 23 points and 17 rebounds per game during the 2007 PBA Fiesta Conference.

Daniels won Continental Basketball Association (CBA) championships with the Dakota Wizards in 2002, and Oklahoma /Lawton–Fort Sill Cavalry in 2008 and 2009.

On October 21, 2011, it was announced that Daniels had made the final 12-man roster for the National Basketball League of Canada's London Lightning.

== Player profile ==
Daniels played as a power forward. Standing 6 ft 8 in (2.03 m), he was known during his college career at Utah State for his defensive play; he led the Big West Conference in rebounds and double-doubles during his junior season and was named the conference's Defensive Player of the Year.
