= 2005–06 PBA Fiesta Conference =

Basketball tournament in the Philippines

2005–2006 PBA Fiesta Conference
- Duration: October 2, 2005 – February 19, 2006
- TV partner(s): ABC

Finals
- Champions: Red Bull Barako
- Runners-up: Purefoods Chunkee Giants

Awards
- Best Player: Enrico Villanueva (Red Bull Barako)
- Best Import: Marquin Chandler (Purefoods Chunkee Giants)
- Finals MVP: Lordy Tugade (Red Bull Barako)

PBA Fiesta Conference chronology
- < 2005 2007 >

PBA conference chronology
- < 2005 Fiesta 2006 Philippine >

The 2005-06 Philippine Basketball Association Fiesta Conference or known as the 2005-06 San Mig Coffee PBA Fiesta Conference for sponsorship reasons, is the first conference of the 2005-06 PBA season. It started on October 2, 2005, and ended on February 19, 2006.

The tournament has five rounds, the survivor playoff, the wildcard playoffs, quarterfinals, semifinals, and finals. All nine teams are included in the playoffs.

== Tournament format ==
- Double round classifications.
- Survivor round
  - Eighth and ninth seeds face off on a survivor playoff, with the eighth seed holding a twice-to-beat advantage.
- Wildcard playoffs
  - Fifth seed and winner of the survivor playoff meet in a best-of-three wildcard playoffs.
  - Sixth seed and seventh face off in a best-of-three wildcard playoff.
- Quarterfinals
  - Fourth seed advance outright to the best-of-five quarterfinals, to meet winner of the fifth seed vs. eighth/ninth seed wildcard series (QF-A).
  - Third seed advance outright to the best-of-five quarterfinals, to meet winner of the sixth seed vs. seventh seed (QF-B).
- Semifinals
  - Second seed advance outright to the best-of-seven semifinals, to meet winner of the QF-B (SF-A).
  - First seed advance outright to the best-of-seven semifinals, to meet winner of the QF-A (SF-B).
- Finals
  - Winners of SF-A and SF-B face off for the best-of-seven finals for the 2005-06 Fiesta Conference Championship.
  - Losers of SF-A and SF-B face off for a one-game playoff for the third-place trophy.

== List of imports ==
Name	Team	Debuted
Shawn Daniels	Air21 Express	October 7, 2005, vs. Purefoods
Artemus McClary	Alaska Aces	October 5, 2005, vs. Sta.Lucia
Sean Lampley	Barangay Ginebra Kings	October 5, 2005, vs. Coca-Cola
Alex Carcamo	Coca-Cola Tigers	October 5, 2005, vs. Barangay Ginebra
Marquin Chandler	Purefoods Chunkee Giants	October 2, 2005, vs. Red Bull
Quemont Greer	Red Bull Barako	October 2, 2005, vs. Purefoods
Rico Hill	San Miguel Beermen	October 7, 2005, vs. Talk 'N Text
Luke Whitehead	Sta. Lucia Realtors	October 5, 2005, vs. Alaska
Damian Cantrell	Talk 'N Text Phone Pals	October 7, 2005, vs. San Miguel
Odell Bradley	Alaska Aces	December 17, 2005, vs. Talk 'N Text
Chris Porter	Barangay Ginebra Kings	December 21, 2005, vs. Talk 'N Text
Omar Thomas	Coca-Cola Tigers	October 26, 2005, vs. Purefoods
James Penny	Red Bull Barako	January 14, 2006, vs. Alaska (QF)
Kwan Johnson	San Miguel Beermen	November 11, 2005, vs. Air21
Leonard White	Sta. Lucia Realtors	October 19, 2005, vs. Talk 'N Text
Omar Weaver	Sta. Lucia Realtors	October 30, 2005, vs. Barangay Ginebra
Damian Owens	Sta. Lucia Realtors	December 7, 2005, vs. Alaska
Darvin Ham	Talk 'N Text Phone Pals	January 18, 2006, vs. Air21 (QF)

== Classification round ==
=== Team standings ===
Pos	Team	W	L	PCT	GB	Qualification
1	Purefoods Chunkee Giants	10	6	.625	—	Advance to semifinals
2	Barangay Ginebra Kings	9	7	.563 (Note: Head-to-head differential: Red Bull +31, Barangay Ginebra +4, Air21 −7, Talk 'N Text −28; fifth-seed playoff: Talk 'N Text 101–91 Air21; second-seed playoff: Barangay Ginebra 109–102 Red Bull)	1	Advance to semifinals
3	Red Bull Barako	9	7	.563	1	Advance to quarterfinals
4	Talk 'N Text Phone Pals	9	7	.563	1	Advance to quarterfinals
5	Air21 Express	9	7	.563	1	Advance to wildcard phase
6	Alaska Aces	7	9	.438 (Note: Head-to-head differential: Alaska +9, Sta. Lucia −9)	3	Advance to wildcard phase
7	Sta. Lucia Realtors	7	9	.438	3	Advance to wildcard phase
8	San Miguel Beermen	6	10	.375 (Note: Head-to-head differential: San Miguel +12, Coca-Cola −12)	4	Twice-to-beat in survivor playoffs
9	Coca-Cola Tigers	6	10	.375	4	Twice-to-win in survivor playoffs

Source: PBA.ph

== Fourth seed playoff ==
ABC

January 4

Recap

Air21 Express 91, Talk 'N Text Phone Pals 101

Cuneta Astrodome, Pasay

== Second seed playoff ==
ABC

January 4

Recap

Red Bull Barako 102, Barangay Ginebra Kings 109

Cuneta Astrodome, Pasay

== Bracket ==
Survivor playoffs (#8 twice-to-beat)
8	San Miguel	82	69
9	Coca-Cola	85*	67

Wildcard playoffs (Best-of-3)
6	Alaska	2
7	Sta. Lucia	0
5	Air21	2
8	San Miguel	1

Quarterfinals (Best-of-5)
3	Red Bull	3
6	Alaska	0
4	Talk 'N Text	2
5	Air21	3

Semifinals (Best-of-7)
2	Barangay Ginebra	3
3	Red Bull	4
1	Purefoods	4
5	Air21	2

Finals (Best-of-7)
3	Red Bull	4
1	Purefoods	2
Third-place playoff
2	Barangay Ginebra	98
5	Air21	108

*Overtime

== Survivor playoffs ==
ABC

January 6

Recap

San Miguel Beermen 82, Coca-Cola Tigers 85 (OT)

Cuneta Astrodome, Pasay

ABC

January 7

Recap

San Miguel Beermen 69, Coca-Cola Tigers 67
San Miguel wins series in two games

Cuneta Astrodome, Pasay

== Wildcard phase ==
=== (5) Air21 vs. (8) San Miguel ===
ABC

January 8

Air21 Express 97, San Miguel Beermen 88

Cuneta Astrodome, Pasay

ABC

January 11

Recap

Air21 Express 103, San Miguel Beermen 104

Cuneta Astrodome, Pasay

ABC

January 13

Recap

Air21 Express 100, San Miguel Beermen 86
Air21 wins series, 2–1

Cuneta Astrodome, Pasay

=== (6) Alaska vs. (7) Sta. Lucia ===
ABC

January 8

Recap

Alaska Aces 108, Sta. Lucia Realtors 104

Cuneta Astrodome, Pasay

ABC

January 11

Alaska Aces 95, Sta. Lucia Realtors 90
Alaska wins series, 2–0

Cuneta Astrodome, Pasay

== Quarterfinals ==
=== (3) Red Bull vs. (6) Alaska ===
ABC

January 14

Recap

Red Bull Barako 100, Alaska Aces 92

Araneta Coliseum, Quezon City

ABC

January 15

Recap

Red Bull Barako 80, Alaska Aces 73

Araneta Coliseum, Quezon City

ABC

January 18

Recap

Red Bull Barako 81, Alaska Aces 65
Red Bull wins series, 3–0

Cuneta Astrodome, Pasay

=== (4) Talk 'N Text vs. (5) Air21 ===
ABC

January 14

Recap

Talk 'N Text Phone Pals 111, Air21 Express 109

Araneta Coliseum, Quezon City

ABC

January 15

Recap

Talk 'N Text Phone Pals 87, Air21 Express 90

Araneta Coliseum, Quezon City

ABC

January 18

Recap

Talk 'N Text Phone Pals 93, Air21 Express 98

Cuneta Astrodome, Pasay

ABC

January 20

Recap

Talk 'N Text Phone Pals 99, Air21 Express 89

Cuneta Astrodome, Pasay

ABC

January 21

Recap

Talk 'N Text Phone Pals 110, Air21 Express 117 (OT)
Air21 wins series, 3–2

Ynares Center, Antipolo

== Semifinals ==
=== (1) Purefoods vs. (5) Air21 ===
ABC

January 22

Recap

Purefoods Chunkee Giants 94, Air21 Express 89

Araneta Coliseum, Quezon City

ABC

January 25

Recap

Purefoods Chunkee Giants 88, Air21 Express 87

Araneta Coliseum, Quezon City

ABC

January 27

Recap

Purefoods Chunkee Giants 87, Air21 Express 101

Ynares Center, Antipolo

ABC

January 29

Recap

Purefoods Chunkee Giants 100, Air21 Express 90

Araneta Coliseum, Quezon City

ABC

February 1

Recap

Purefoods Chunkee Giants 99, Air21 Express 100

Araneta Coliseum, Quezon City

ABC

February 3

Recap

Purefoods Chunkee Giants 100, Air21 Express 79
Purefoods wins series, 4–2

Cuneta Astrodome, Pasay

Purefoods won the first two games, with Marquin Chandler scoring 46 points in game 1, and 29 in game 2 to put the Giants up, 2–0. In game 3, Air21's Ren-Ren Ritualo scored 40 points to prevent a sweep at Antipolo. The Express had an awful shooting night on game 4 to pave way for a 3– series lead for Purefooods.

In the closing minutes of game 5, Air21 had a 17–9 run, but Purefoods had their run thanks to a rare four-point play from Kerby Raymundo. Ranidel de Ocampo split his free-throws to pad Air21's lead into three. With Air21 up by one, Raymundo rebounded the ball with 11 seconds remaining, but Roger Yap flubbed his pass and missed his lay-up against Shawn Daniels to give Air21 the victory. Purefoods erected a 20-point lead in game 7, and Air21's run came up short as they entered the PBA finals for the first time in four years.

=== (2) Barangay Ginebra vs. (3) Red Bull ===
ABC

January 22

Recap

Barangay Ginebra Kings 105, Red Bull Barako 100 (OT)

Araneta Coliseum, Quezon City

ABC

January 25

Recap

Barangay Ginebra Kings 83, Red Bull Barako 86

Araneta Coliseum, Quezon City

ABC

January 27

Recap

Barangay Ginebra Kings 85, Red Bull Barako 93

Ynares Center, Antipolo

ABC

January 29

Recap

Barangay Ginebra Kings 85, Red Bull Barako 88

Araneta Coliseum, Quezon City

ABC

February 1

Recap

Barangay Ginebra Kings 97, Red Bull Barako 83

Araneta Coliseum, Quezon City

ABC

February 3

Recap

Barangay Ginebra Kings 85, Red Bull Barako 77

Cuneta Astrodome, Pasay

ABC

February 5

Recap

Barangay Ginebra Kings 79, Red Bull Barako 83
Red Bull wins series, 4–3

Araneta Coliseum, Quezon City

After losing game 1, James Penny converted clutch three-pointers to prevent a 0–2 hole for Red Bull. Clutch plays from former Ateneo teammates Enrico Villanueva and Larry Fonacier prevented a Ginebra run late in the fourth quarter in games 3 to 4 that placed Red Bull in an imposing 3–1 series lead. With Penny resting on game 6, Ginebra had a difficult win to close the series gap to one game; Ginebra's defensive stand forced a game 7, which put them on the way of replicating the Ginebra team of 15 seasons earlier when they won the championship after trailing 3–1.

With a seesaw battle ongoing throughout the game, Ginebra import Chris Porter slam dunked to put Ginebra up, 75–73. Barako Celino Cruz converted a three-point shot to put Red Bull by a point, 76–75. Following a Ginebra turnover, Red Bull import James Penny converted his own 3-point jumper, to put Red Bull up for good, 79–75.

== Third place playoff ==
ABC

February 8

Recap

Barangay Ginebra Kings 98, Air21 Express 108

Araneta Coliseum, Quezon City

== Finals ==
2005–06 PBA Fiesta Conference finals
Team	Coach	Wins
Red Bull Barako	Yeng Guiao	4
Purefoods Chunkee Giants	Ryan Gregorio	2
- Dates: February 8–19, 2006
- MVP: Lordy Tugade
- Television: ABC

PBA Fiesta Conference finals chronology
- < 2005 Fiesta 2007 >

PBA finals chronology
- < 2005 Fiesta 2006 Philippine >

The 2005–06 Philippine Basketball Association (PBA) Fiesta Conference finals was the best-of-7 basketball championship series of the 2005–06 PBA Fiesta Conference, and the conclusion of the conference's playoffs. Red Bull Barako and Purefoods Chunkee Giants played for the 90th championship contested by the league.

The Red Bull Barako won their 5th league championship with a 4–2 series victory over Purefoods.

=== Series scoring summary ===
The following scoring summary is written in a line score format, except that the quarter numbers are replaced by game numbers.

Team	Game 1†	Game 2	Game 3	Game 4	Game 5	Game 6	Wins
Purefoods	102	84	103	96	86	73	2
Red Bull	107	98	97	91	91	83	4

† denotes number of overtimes

=== Game one ===
Wednesday, February 8, at the Araneta Coliseum.

ABC

February 8

Purefoods Chunkee Giants 102, Red Bull Barako 107 (OT)
Red Bull leads series, 1–0

Araneta Coliseum, Quezon City

After conquering their respective semi-final rivals, the Giants and the Barako are both itching to win their first PBA titles in 4 years. Purefoods haven't won since the 2002 Governors' Cup, while Red Bull haven't won since the 2002 Commissioner's Cup.

The game was close throughout, with neither team pulling away. However, Red Bull ignited a run that would make them lead by 8 points at the third, but the Giants inched closer as they lessened the gap to a point. In the fourth quarter, Red Bull tried to pull away, but Purefoods fought back. In the dying seconds of regulation, with the score tied at 89-all, Purefoods import Marquin Chandler failed to convert an open jumper at the paint that could've won them the game.

In Overtime, Red Bull raced to an eight-point lead. In the final minute, Purefoods' Noy Castillo converted two three-pointers that cut the lead to two. But a crucial turnover down low cost Purefoods the game.

In the marquee matchup, former Ateneo Blue Eagle Enrico Villanueva, with 25 points, won the matchup against former Letranite Kerby Raymundo, who finished with 11 markers.

=== Game two ===
ABC

February 10

Purefoods Chunkee Giants 84, Red Bull Barako 98
Red Bull leads series, 2–0

Cuneta Astrodome, Pasay

With a conquest of Purefoods at game one, third seed Red Bull Barako aimed to have a commanding 2-0 lead at the best of seven series.

The Barakos opened the game with relative ease, with the Chunkee Giants within striking distance. Purefoods stayed close through the efforts of import Marquin Chandler. However, Red Bull's import James Penny appeared to have an answer on every shot made by Chandler. By the start of the fourth, Purefoods led by a point, 71-70, after Red Bull erased an 8-point deficit.

The fourth quarter began with Purefoods keeping close with Red Bull. However, Red Bull answered with a 12-0 run, capped off by a three-pointer by Larry Fonacier. Purefoods weren't able to erase the lead, leading to a 2-0 lead for Red Bull.

Chandler led all scorers with 32 points while Red Bull's former NU standout Lordy Tugade outscored all locals with 30 points.

=== Game three ===
ABC

February 12

Purefoods Chunkee Giants 103, Red Bull Barako 97
Red Bull leads series, 2–1

Cuneta Astrodome, Pasay

The last time Purefoods trailed 0–2 in a finals series was during the 2002 Governors' Cup. The team went on to win the next four games and defeated the Alaska Aces to win the championship.

Red Bull, on the other hand, is seeking for their third PBA championship, and the stopping of the four-conference championship streak of San Miguel Corporation teams (in which Purefoods is a subsidiary).

The first quarter saw easy baskets from Red Bull against a virtually nonexistent Purefoods defense. Purefoods, on the other hand, had to work for their every basket. Purefoods then had problems when their import, Marquin Chandler, got into foul trouble, forcing the Chunkee Giants to play All-Filipino for a great part of the first half. The quarter ended with the score tied, 26-all.

On the second quarter, Purefoods made key defensive adjustments that limited Red Bull's scoring opportunities. The Chunkee Giants also had big contributions from their bench, especially from Marc Pingris, who scattered 8 markers at the 2nd quarter. The Barakos still relied on the frontline of Villanueva and Tugade, with the former Ateneo standout scoring 15 points at the first half. Purefoods, however, seized the momentum and erected a ten-point lead by halftime, 54–44.

The two teams settled down at the third quarter. James Penny, the former Texas Christian and Oklahoma Storm player posted big plays, including a three-point play. Red Bull utilized the foul problems of Purefoods. Nevertheless, the Giants still led, 77-68.

In the payoff period, Red Bull inched closer on every possession. With Red Bull down by six, Chandler and Fonacier had a scuffle at the half court line. This led to a technical foul for Chandler. Red Bull nipped the lead to four. But when the Chunkee Giants raised the lead back to ten, Chandler fouled out at the 3:49 mark, which led to a 5-0 run by Red Bull. A Raymundo assist to Jondan Salvador raised the lead by seven at the 1:00 mark, and Purefoods never looked back as they clinched their first victory in the Fiesta Conference finals.

Chunkee Giant Kerby Raymundo finished the game with 13 points, 11 rebounds and nine assists, a near triple-double. Villanueva led all locals with 25 points, while teammate Tugade had zero points in the second half to finish with 14 points. Penny won the battle of the imports, outscoring Chandler 31-26.

The halftime show featured the first part of the interview of ABC Sports' Richard del Rosario to Kris Aquino and Purefoods sophomore James Yap, who are engaged to each other.

=== Game four ===
ABC

February 14

Purefoods Chunkee Giants 96, Red Bull Barako 91
Series tied 2–2

Araneta Coliseum, Quezon City

Before the game started, the league handed out its Best Player and Best Import of the Conference Award. The Best Player, restricted to Filipinos had a tighter race among Purefoods' Kerby Raymundo, Air21's Renren Ritualo, and Red Bull's Enrico Villanueva. The Best Import award, on the other hand, was contested between Purefoods' Marquin Chandler and Air21's Shawn Daniels.

Villanueva eventually won the Best Player award, when the PBA Press Corps voted him over Raymundo and Ritualo. The Best Import award, was in reality a no-contest since although Chandler and Daniels stayed with their clubs all-conference long, only Chandler was able to lead his team to the finals.

On the game proper, just like in the previous three games, Red Bull got off to a good start when Chunkee Giant Jondan Salvador injured his knee. Penny and Villanueva combined for 25 points by halftime. However, Purefoods caught up with them at the third quarter, thanks to good shooting from Chandler and Noy Castillo.

On the fourth period, James Yap, who was celebrating his 24th birthday made clutch freethrows, much to the delight of fiancée Kris Aquino. Further freethrows from Raymundo, James and Roger (not related) Yap gave the advantage to Purefoods. A dribbling violation by Red Bull import James Penny sealed the win for Purefoods.

In the post-game interview, Raymundo said that for him, he should be the MVP, his coach Ryan Gregorio, agreed wholeheartedly, as Raymundo brought Villanueva to school in the dying minutes of the game, especially at the low post. Raymundo finished the game with 21 points and 9 rebounds, and was chosen as the player of the game. Villanueva led all scorers with 25 points, and 14 rebounds.

=== Game five ===
ABC

February 17

Purefoods Chunkee Giants 86, Red Bull Barako 91
Red Bull leads series, 3–2

Cuneta Astrodome, Pasay

Red Bull Barako seemed intent from the get-go to prevent a 3-2 Purefoods series lead, as they, like in previous games, surged ahead at the first half. Red Bull, through the effort of import James Penny and locals Lordy Tugade and Junthy Valenzuela each converted a trey, to give the Bulls their biggest lead 50-34.

Best Player of the Conference Enrico Villanueva, although he finished with nine points, his lowest yet in the series, he grabbed a team-high 11 rebounds. Penny and Rookie of the Year candidate Larry Fonacier carried the scoring load for the Bulls.

Best Import of the Conference Marquin Chandler had another day in the office with a series-high 43 points, but he did not receive support from the locals, especially when the Bulls won the battle of the bench, 40-13.

The Barako never looked back in the second half on their way for a 91–86 game-five win. Tugade led all locals with 17 points, followed closely by Raymundo with 16.

=== Game six ===
ABC

February 19

Purefoods Chunkee Giants 73, Red Bull Barako 83
Red Bull wins series, 4–2

Araneta Coliseum, Quezon City

Red Bull put down the defensive clamps in the stretch and got several clutch plays from an array of heroes to finally send the Giants down to their knees and capture the PBA Fiesta Conference crown before a roaring crowd of 10,755.

James Penny was in the zone in the third quarter but solid contributions coming from Mick Pennisi, Cyrus Baguio, Topex Robinson and Finals' Most Valuable Player Lordy Tugade also help the Bulls clinch their third franchise title since joining the league in 2000.

Pennisi had big shots in the end, including two three-pointers and a long two, while Baguio, Celino Cruz and Junthy Valenzuela made great stops that rendered the Giants scoreless in the final one minute and 33 seconds.

2005-06 Fiesta Conference Champions

Red Bull Barako
Third title

== Broadcasters ==
The Associated Broadcasting Company televised the games on Philippine TV.

The play-by-play commentators were Mico Halili and Ed Picson, while the color commentators are Norman Black and Quinito Henson. The courtside reporters were Richard del Rosario, Eric Reyes, Jason Webb and Patricia Bermudez-Hizon.

== Trivia ==
- Talk N' Text failed to enter the semifinals of a PBA tournament for the first time since the 2003 Invitational tournament.
- Air21, technically made its second semifinals appearance in franchise history. Apparently, TV coverage mentioned Air21's appearance as its first-time ever. In 2003 they placed third in the invitational tournament.
- Purefoods made its first semifinals appearance since winning the 2002 Governors Cup.
- Barangay Ginebra played its first game 7 since the 1991 First Conference title, when they were Ginebra San Miguel and defeated Shell for the championship.
