= 2006 PBA Philippine Cup =

Basketball cup finals

- Duration: March 5 – July 21, 2006
- TV partner(s): ABC (Local); The Filipino Channel (International)

Finals
- Champions: Purefoods Chunkee Giants
- Runners-up: Red Bull Barako

Awards
- Best Player: Danny Seigle (San Miguel Beermen)
- Finals MVP: Marc Pingris (Purefoods Chunkee Giants)

PBA Philippine Cup chronology
- < 2004–05 2006–07 >

PBA conference chronology
- < 2005–06 Fiesta 2006–07 Philippine >

The 2006 Philippine Basketball Association (PBA) Philippine Cup or known as the 2006 Gran Matador Brandy Philippine Basketball Association (PBA) Philippine Cup is the second conference of the 2005-06 PBA season.

The tournament has four rounds, the wildcard playoffs, quarterfinals, semi-finals and the Finals. All nine teams are included in the playoffs.

The Purefoods Chunkee Giants defeated Red Bull Barako in six games of the best-of-seven finals series.

== Tournament format ==
- Double round classifications.
- Wildcard playoffs
  - Sixth to Ninth place teams will play in a single round robin, with their win–loss records in the classification phase being carried over.
  - Team with the best record after three games will move to the quarterfinals.
  - If a team wins all three games in the round robin despite not having the best record of the four team, a knockout match will be held against the team with the best record for the final quarterfinals spot.
- Quarterfinals
  - Fourth seed advance outright to the best-of-five quarterfinals, to meet fifth seed team (QF-A).
  - Third seed advance outright to the best-of-five quarterfinals, to meet winner of the Wildcard playoffs (QF-B).
- Semi-Finals
  - Second seed advance outright to the best-of-seven semi-finals, to meet winner of the QF-B (SF-A).
  - First seed advance outright to the best-of-seven semi-finals, to meet winner of the QF-A (SF-B).
- Finals
  - Winners of SF-A and SF-B face off for the best-of-seven Finals for the 2006 Philippine Cup Championship.
  - Losers of SF-A and SF-B face off for a one-game playoff for the Third Place trophy.

== Classification round ==
=== Team standings ===
Pos	Team	W	L	PCT	GB	Qualification
1	Purefoods Chunkee Giants	12	4	.750	—	Advance to semifinals
2	San Miguel Beermen	11	5	.688	1	Advance to semifinals
3	Red Bull Barako	9	7	.563 (Note: Head-to-head differential: Red Bull +11, Alaska −11)	3	Advance to quarterfinals
4	Alaska Aces	9	7	.563	3	Advance to quarterfinals
5	Coca-Cola Tigers	7	9	.438 (Note: Head-to-head differential: Air21 +16, Coca-Cola +10, Barangay Ginebra − 26; fifth-seed playoff: Coca-Coca 87–73 Air21)	5	Advance to quarterfinals
6	Air21 Express	7	9	.438	5	Advance to wildcard phase
7	Barangay Ginebra Kings	7	9	.438	5	Advance to wildcard phase
8	Talk 'N Text Phone Pals	6	10	.375	6	Advance to wildcard phase
9	Sta. Lucia Realtors	4	12	.250	8	Advance to wildcard phase

Source: [www.pba.ph PBA.ph]

== Fifth seed playoff ==
ABC

May 28

Air21 Express 73, Coca-Cola Tigers 87

Araneta Coliseum, Quezon City

- Coca-Cola captures third outright quarterfinals berth, Air21 is relegated to the wildcard playoffs, a round-robin format.

== Wildcard phase ==
Overall standings
Pos	Team	W	L	PCT	GB	Qualification
6	Barangay Ginebra Kings	10	9	.526	—	Quarterfinals
7	Air21 Express	9	10	.474	1	
8	Talk 'N Text Phone Pals	6	13	.316	4	
9	Sta. Lucia Realtors	5	14	.263	5	

Source: PBA.ph

Wildcard phase standings
Pos	Team	W	L
6	Barangay Ginebra Kings	3	0
7	Air21 Express	2	1
8	Sta. Lucia Realtors	1	2
9	Talk 'N Text Phone Pals	0	3

Source: PBA.ph

== Bracket ==
Quarterfinals (Best-of-5)
4	Alaska	3
5	Coca-Cola	1
3	Red Bull	3
7	Barangay Ginebra	2

Semifinals (Best-of-7)
1	Purefoods	4
4	Alaska	3
2	San Miguel	3
3	Red Bull	4

Finals (Best-of-7)
1	Purefoods	4
3	Red Bull	2
Third place playoff
4	Alaska	102
2	San Miguel	95

== Quarterfinals ==
Games 1 to 4 were held at the Araneta Coliseum. Game 5 of Red Bull vs Ginebra was at the Ynares Center.

Team 1	Series	Team 2	Game 1	Game 2	Game 3	Game 4	Game 5
(3) Red Bull Barako	3–2	(7) Barangay Ginebra Kings	95–86	103–112	85–97	118–97	120–98
(4) Alaska Aces	3–1	(5) Coca-Cola Tigers	95–94	81–75	75–77	94–69	—

== Semifinals ==
Games 1 to 5 were held in the Araneta Coliseum, while Games 6 and 7 were held at the Cuneta Astrodome.

Team 1	Series	Team 2	Game 1	Game 2	Game 3	Game 4	Game 5	Game 6	Game 7
(1) Purefoods Chunkee Giants	4–3	(4) Alaska Aces	92–94	77–86	82–79	77–99	85–74	99–96	90–89
(2) San Miguel Beermen	3–4	(3) Red Bull Barako	78–94	114–98	95–99	106–82	101–107	116–101	84–86

== Third place playoff ==
ABC

July 5

San Miguel Beermen 95, Alaska Aces 102
Alaska wins third place

Araneta Coliseum, Quezon City

== Finals ==
ABC

July 5

Purefoods Chunkee Giants 101, Red Bull Barako 97

Araneta Coliseum, Quezon City

ABC

July 7

Purefoods Chunkee Giants 93, Red Bull Barako 82

Cuneta Astrodome, Pasay

ABC

July 9

Purefoods Chunkee Giants 79, Red Bull Barako 89

Araneta Coliseum, Quezon City

ABC

July 12

Purefoods Chunkee Giants 99, Red Bull Barako 81

Araneta Coliseum, Quezon City

ABC

July 19

Purefoods Chunkee Giants 93, Red Bull Barako 98

Araneta Coliseum, Quezon City

ABC

July 21

Purefoods Chunkee Giants 90, Red Bull Barako 83
Purefoods win series, 4–2

Araneta Coliseum, Quezon City

== Broadcasters ==
The play-by-play commentators are Mico Halili, Ed Picson and Mon Liboro while the color commentators are Norman Black, Quinito Henson, Siot Tanquingcen, Jong Uichico and Chot Reyes. The courtside reporters are Richard del Rosario, Eric Reyes, Dominic Uy, Jason Webb, Peter Martin, Peaches Aberin and Patricia Bermudez-Hizon. The grand draw of Hope and Winston's Sports Ride promo was also broadcast during the halftime of Game 4 of the finals, as the said event will be the final promotional segment to be sponsored by tobacco companies broadcast during the finals until the Philippine government announced that commercials and sponsorships related to tobacco products on TV and Radio will be banned starting on January 1, 2007.

== Further information ==
- Talk N' Text failed to enter the quarterfinals for the first time since the 1998 All-Filipino Cup, when the then-Mobiline Phone Pals failed to enter the semifinals of the said tournament.
- Barangay Ginebra failed to enter the semifinals for the first since the 2003 Reinforced Conference.
- Coca-Cola and Alaska met for the first time since Alaska won the 2003 Invitational tournament over the Tigers.
- Alaska's defeat in the semifinals was the third time that the Aces fail to beat Purefoods after leading a series 2-0. In 1990, Alaska lost to Purefoods, 3-2 in the Third Conference Finals after they won the first two games of the series. In 2002, the Aces lost to the then-TJ Hotdogs in seven games after taking a 2-0 series lead. In the semifinals, they had a 2-0 and 3-1 series leads.
- San Miguel has not won a seventh game since 1992, since defeating Purefoods for the Third Conference crown. Since then, the Beermen lost to Alaska in the 1995 Governors Cup Finals and the 1998 All-Filipino Cup, to Coca-Cola in the 2003 Reinforced Conference Finals and to Red Bull in the 2006 Philippine Cup semifinals.
- Red Bull has won all Game 7s they have played since joining the league in 2000. Red Bull defeated Talk N' Text for the 2002 Commissioners Cup trophy. In the 2006 Fiesta Conference semifinals, the Bulls beat Barangay Ginebra and in the 2006 Philippine Cup Playoffs semis, they won over San Miguel.
- It was Purefoods' 11th finals appearance in the All-Filipino Conference, now called as the Philippine Cup since the 2004-2005 event. They have won four All-Filipino titles in history with the 1997 edition as their last.
- A win by Red Bull in the finals would sweep all the titles available in the 2005-2006 PBA season. It would be the first since Alaska won the PBA grand slam in 1996. However, the term grand slam, provided a Bulls win in the Philippine Cup, is disputed as of the moment.
- The Red Bull-Purefoods finals duel was the first back-to-back conference finals matchup since 1998, when Mobiline Phone Pals and the Formula Shell Zoom Masters met in the special 1998 PBA Centennial Cup and the 1998 PBA Governors Cup. The Phone Pals won 67-66 in the one game Centennial final, while the Zoom Masters defeated Mobiline in seven full games to win the Governor's Cup. With the Centennial Cup being classified as a special tournament, the last back-to-back full conference Finals match-ups was between Alaska and San Miguel in the same 1998 season, at the All-Filipino and Commissioner's Cups.
