= Barako Bull Energy Boosters =

- Founded: 2000
- Withdrew: 2011
- History: Batang Red Bull Energizers (2000); Red Bull Thunder (2000–2003); Red Bull Barako (2003–2009); The Bulls (alternate monicker) (2006–2009); Barako Bull Energy Boosters (2009–2010, 2010–11); Barako Bull Coffee Masters (2010)
- Team colors: Red, black, yellow, white
- Company: Photokina Marketing Corporation
- Ownership: George Chua
- Championships: PBA; 3; 2001 Commissioner's; 2002 Commissioner's; 2005–06 Fiesta 5 Final appearances PBL (1): *1996 All-Filipino Cup
Light uniform	Dark uniform

The Barako Bull Energy Boosters were a professional basketball team of the Philippine Basketball Association owned by the Photokina Marketing Corporation. They entered the league in 2000, after a successful stint in the semi-professional Philippine Basketball League during the late 1990s. Under the name Agfa Color, the team won a championship in 1996. It was originally known as the Red Bull Barako before the team announced its name change.

Barako Bull has won two Commissioner's Cups, in 2001 and in 2002 and the 2006 Fiesta Conference. Willie Miller became the first Barako player to win the league MVP title in 2002.

The franchise took a leave of absence after the 2010-11 PBA Philippine Cup. The players were distributed to other teams via dispersal draft as their slot was taken by the guest team Smart Gilas. In March 2011, Barako Bull announced that it will not be returning to the league. Eventually, the franchise was sold to the Lina Group of Companies in July 2011 upon approval of the PBA Board of Governors.

== History ==
=== Philippine Basketball League ===
Photokina Marketing joined the Philippine Basketball League during the mid-90s. They played under the name Agfa Color in the early days of their PBL stint. Once, they had San Miguel player Danny Ildefonso as one of their players along with his NU Bulldogs teammate Lordy Tugade and Jonas Mariano coming back from a knee injury with Ginebra the year before.

It also saw the talent of Cebuanos Jimwell Torion and Junthy Valenzuela along with other provincial cagers Rene Suba and Jun Carmona. Letran star Kerby Raymundo and Filipino-American Davonn Harp later joined the squad.

Agfa Color/Red Bull would always fall short of a title as Tanduay won several PBL championships at their expense. In 1999, they were among the best teams in the league but would lose to Welcoat Paints in the finals of Challenge Cup. In October, the PBA announced that Red Bull was accepted as the 10th member of the league beginning in the 2000 season.

=== Batang Red Bull Energizers ===
The franchise played their first PBA season as the Batang Red Bull Energizers. Red Bull was allowed to take six players from their PBL team and took Kerby Raymundo, Davonn Harp, Lordy Tugade, Jimwell Torion, Junthy Valenzuela and Bernard Tanpua. PBL Commissioner Yeng Guiao, a former PBA coach, resigned his post to join Red Bull as coach in the PBA. They also got Ato Agustin from the expansion pool.

After losing their opening game in the 2000 All-Filipino Cup to Barangay Ginebra Kings, they won two more games to improve to 2–3. But the league disqualified Raymundo from playing. It was discovered that he had falsified his documents, claiming he graduated from high school in 1996, when actually he finished his secondary studies a year later. Mick Pennisi also arrived as a solution to the team's lack of height. The games won by the Energizers were nullified. Red Bull finished 10th and failed to enter the quarterfinals.

In the Commissioner's Cup, Jack Hartman became Red Bull's first import but failed to show anything promising for Batang Red Bull which failed to enter the quarters once again. Before the end of the tournament, the Energizers get Raymund Tutt as replacement. Tutt scored 56 points in his PBA debut, which still stands today as the highest points scored by a Red Bull player in a single game.

=== Red Bull Thunder: Championship era ===
Tutt returned for the 2000 Governors Cup, and the renamed as the Batang Red Bull Thunder made a strong showing to finish in third place at the end of the tournament, their first trophy in the league. Davonn Harp was named Rookie of the Year at the end of the season.

During the 2001 PBA Draft, Red Bull selected former Letran Knight and MBA star Willie Miller as its first overall pick. Former Letranite Kerby Raymundo was also allowed to return for Red Bull for the upcoming season.

In 2001, Red Bull finished seventh in the All-Filipino Conference and met eventual champion San Miguel Beermen in the quarterfinals. With the Thunder needing to win twice to advance to the semis, Batang Red Bull shocked the Beermen winning the first game by double-figures, but lost in the deciding game capped off by Danny Seigle's three-pointer to seal SMB's win.

Former Duke University and NBA standout Antonio Lang bannered the Thunder in the Commissioner's Cup. After a sub-par performance in the tournament opener, Lang proved to be the right import for Red Bull. The Thunder advanced to their first finals appearance against the mighty San Miguel Beermen. Red Bull took the first two games of the series behind strong performances by Lang and Harp. The Beermen later tied the series at 2–2 in a physically intense battle that saw several suspensions on the Red Bull side. But in Game five, Red Bull won 79–77 after a potential game-tying basket by San Miguel import Nate Johnson was blocked from behind by Miller with no time left. In Game six, Lang recovered from a four-point outing in Game five to lead Red Bull to their first PBA championship. Lang was also named as Best Import of the Commissioners Cup.

In the Governor's Cup, Tutt returned for the team in hopes of claiming back-to-back title, but the Thunder missed the semifinals after being loss against Alaska in 6th-seed playoff.

Harp was loaned by Red Bull to the national team in 2002. The Thunder was finish with a record of 8-8 card in the semifinals.

In the Commissioner's Cup, Harp returned for Batang Red Bull along with Antonio Lang and Julius Nwosu. The Thunder dominated the tournament, eliminating Shell in the quarterfinals and the Beermen in the semis to face the Talk 'N Text Phone Pals in the finals. Four games into the series, Lang was replaced by another NBA veteran in Sean Lampley. Lang was even accused of game-fixing, which he denied. With Lampley, Red Bull overcame a 2–3 deficit to win an emotional Game seven for their second PBA title.

Red Bull's hope for a second title was denied in the All-Filipino as Alaska booted them out in the semis.

In 2003, The Thunder used their first round pick to select 2002 UAAP MVP Enrico Villanueva from Ateneo de Manila to bolster Red Bull's frontline. Red Bull went 10–1 in the early goings of the All-Filipino Cup before finishing with a 14–4 record. However, their 0–3 record in the quarterfinals eliminated them from title contention. The All-Filipino Conference also saw the suspensions of Harp and Torion for testing positive for taking illegal substances.

Red Bull Barako logo from 2003 to 2007.

Batang Red Bull renamed the team as Red Bull Barako for the Invitational tournament. They managed to enter the semis but was defeated by Alaska in a one-game showdown.

After a 1–2 start in the Reinforced Conference, the Barakos hired former Charlotte Hornet and Chicago Bull Scott Burrell as import. Red Bull won 10 games to finish with an 11–2 record entering the quarterfinals. They were upset by Talk 'N Text in the opening round. But the deciding game was marred by a vicious clothesline of Torion on Phone Pals' point guard Jimmy Alapag. The incident gave Torion an eight-month suspension, later reduced to only four.

Red Bull made its third Finals appearance in 2004, losing to eventual champion Barangay Ginebra in the transitional tournament dubbed as the 2004 Fiesta Conference. The Barakos fielded in six imports during the said conference but its last import Victor Thomas won Best Import honors.

During the 2004–05 Philippine Cup, Red Bull was decimated with the departures of alleged Fil-Shams (Filipino-Americans that did not prove their Filipino blood) Mick Pennisi and Davonn Harp, who were deported after the Department of Justice found them to have falsified their documents.

But the event paved the way for guys like Tugade, Valenzuela and Enrico Villanueva to shine as Red Bull recovered to place fourth in the 2005 Fiesta Cup. The former Ateneo center won the Most Improved Player honors.

=== Red Bull Barako: Back-to-back Finals appearances ===
Red Bull became somewhat of a flashback to the Ateneo Blue Eagles squad of UAAP 2002 when Larry Fonacier and Paolo Bugia were drafted by the team in the second round of the 2005 PBA Draft in August.

The Bulls won their third PBA title during the 2005–06 Fiesta Conference defeating the Purefoods Chunkee Giants in six games. Enrico Villanueva won the Best Player of the Conference honors while Lordy Tugade was named as the Finals MVP.

During their title run, the Bulls replaced import Quemont Greer in place of a more team-oriented James Penny at the start of the quarterfinals. Red Bull swept Alaska in the quarterfinals while surviving a seven-game tussle with crowd-favorite Barangay Ginebra Kings in the semi-finals.

The championship gave Yeng Guiao his fifth PBA title, tying former Toyota mentor Dante Silverio for sixth on the all-time PBA list.

Before the Philippine Cup, Red Bull acquired the services of another former Atenean, Rich Alvarez, from Alaska. While the Bulls were highly favored to win the title, they started the tournament with a 3–6 record. However, they won six of their final seven games to finish with a 9–7 win–loss card in the classification phase, clinching an outright quarterfinals berth.

Red Bull survived a five-game clash with rival Barangay Ginebra in the quarterfinals. This was after the crowd-favorite Kings led the series 2–1, but the Bulls won the last two games by a combined margin of more than 50 points. The Bulls faced the San Miguel Beermen in the semifinals when controversy struck the Bulls, after they staged a mini-walkout during Game Four of their series. They eventually returned to the court and lost by double figures. This led to a 400,000 peso fine on the team, 100,000 on head coach Yeng Guiao, 6,000 for player Lordy Tugade and 1,000 for a member of the team's personnel.

However, Red Bull managed to beat San Miguel Beer in seven games after a buzzer-beating shot by Junthy Valenzuela to seal a two-point victory for the Bulls, setting up a rematch of the Fiesta Conference finals series against Purefoods. The Bulls, though, lost to Purefoods in six games, denying them of a chance to sweep all championships in the 2005–06 season. Larry Fonacier was named as the 2005–06 PBA Rookie of the Year with Villanueva named to the Mythical Five selection.

=== The Bulls: Semifinal eliminations ===
The Bulls had only one pick in the 2006 PBA Draft and selected Ateneo shooting guard Magnum Membrere with the 19th overall pick. The move triggered another addition to the team's dominant lineup of former players from the Blue Eagles lineup. In the middle of the elimination round, Red Bull traded 2005–2006 Fiesta Cup Finals MVP Lordy Tugade to the San Miguel Beermen alongside reserve Omanzie Rodriguez in exchange for future draft picks.

The Barakos also added former Shell Turbo Charger Carlo Sharma into their line-up during the off-season. The addition of Sharma gave the Barakos, who only has main man Enrico Villanueva as its legitimate low-post threat, additional ceiling and inside presence.

In the Philippine Cup, Red Bull placed third after the elimination round with an 11–7 win–loss card and an outright quarterfinals berth in which they defeated the Sta. Lucia Realtors, 3–1. In the semifinals, Red Bull lost against the San Miguel in seven games that highlighted by several physical encounters by both teams during the series.

Red Bull gained the top seed in the Fiesta Conference but dealt Enrico Villanueva to San Miguel Beermen for Rommel Adducul. The former MBA MVP was later shipped to the Purefoods Tender Juicy Giants and exchange for Don Camaso and a second round draft pick at the 2008 PBA Draft. Despite the strong performance of Larry Fonacier and the emergence of Cyrus Baguio, Red Bull lost to Talk 'N Text led by the strong performance of Mark Cardona in a six-game series.

Red Bull Barako logo from 2007 to 2009.

With Red Bull debuting an updated version of their logo in 2007, the Barakos continued their semifinal qualification streak, finishing fourth in the eliminations of the 2007-08 PBA Philippine Cup and sweeping the Magnolia Beverage Masters in the quarterfinals meeting 2005–06 rival Purefoods in the semifinals. The Bulls extended the series to seven games after trading games with Purefoods, but the TJ Giants pulled away in the deciding game to eliminate Red Bull in contention for the third straight time.

Although the Barakos posted an identical 11–7 card in the 2008 Fiesta Conference, they managed to finish second to earn themselves a seventh-consecutive semifinals appearance. With Mexico national basketball team mainstay Adam Parada as their import, Red Bull faced the rampaging Barangay Ginebra Kings with a 6-game winning streak in the semifinals. Adam Parada played through injury but the Kings swept the Barakos in the semifinals to eliminate the Barakos anew.

Prior to the 2008–09 season, they lost Mick Pennisi who went to San Miguel Beermen and Topex Robinson who went to Purefoods TJ Giants and got rookies Larry Rodriguez, Jeff Chan, and Mark Cuevas. Disaster was booming around the franchise as they lost key players such as Rich Alvarez and Cyrus Baguio. But there are also some players who went to Red Bull and started a new beginning like Gabby Espinas from Air21 Express and Mike Holper from Barangay Ginebra Kings. They only won 5 out of 18 outings. Due to this, they were rumored as about to be disbanded which caused Yeng Guiao to resign as head coach during late December.

=== Barako Bull Energy Boosters: Leo Isaac at the helm ===
Barako Bull Energy Boosters logo.

Barako Energy Coffee Masters logo.

The newly christened Barako Bull Energy Boosters, with team manager Andy Jao, hired former PBA Rookie of the Year Leo Isaac as its new head coach with Ariel Vanguardia of the JRU Heavy Bombers and former Philippines women's national basketball team coach Raymond Celis as chief lieutenants. They also signed new recruits Alex Crisano and John Arigo.

Despite the new name, coach, signings and image, the team floundered in the import-laden 2009 Fiesta Conference, mustering only two out of 14 wins, although one of those came from Philippine Cup champions Talk 'N Text Tropang Texters where the Energy Boosters rallied down by more than 20 points to win in overtime. They were eliminated in the wildcard phase by former doormats Rain or Shine Elasto Painters.

Burger King and Barako Bull beat the trade deadline and agreed in a trade between Carlo Sharma and Richard Alonzo.

Team manager Tony Chua perished at the height of Tropical Storm Ketsana on September 26, 2009.

=== 2010–11: Financial woes and disbandment ===
==== Philippine Cup ====
At the start of the 2010–11 season, they hired Junel Baculi as the new head coach of the Barako Bull. The team was involved with several trades during off season with Barangay Ginebra, Powerade, and new team Meralco, acquiring Sunday Salvacion, Jason Misolas, Khazim Mirza, and Ken Bono. The Energy Boosters picked Borgie Hermida in the year's rookie draft. In the first weeks of the Philippine Cup, they signed undrafted rookie Hans Thiele and eventually became the team's top scorer together with Salvacion. After a month with the team, Thiele was shipped to Meralco, in exchange for the team's 2013 2nd round pick and Dennis Daa. After the Energy Boosters finished 3–11 in the Philippine Cup, the team got involved on trades that shipped their core players Reed Juntilla, Sunday Salvacion and Mark Isip on different teams.

==== Leave of absence ====
On January 20, 2011, the management of the Energy Boosters announced that they will take a leave of absence for the upcoming Commissioner's Cup to make way for the Smart Gilas Philippine national team. The application was eventually approved during the team owners meeting on January 24. The players of the squad will be put on a conditional dispersal draft on February 7, then after the Commissioner's Cup is finished, all of these players will return to Barako Bull, if the team will eventually return. The owners announced on March 20 that they do not intend to return to the season-ending Governors Cup. In a letter sent to PBA Commissioner Chito Salud, the owners of the Barako Bull franchise mentioned their ongoing legal battle against TC Pharmaceuticals Industries, Co. the manufacturer of Red Bull in Thailand, and the death of one of their owners, Tony Chua during the onslaught of Typhoon Ketsana in 2009 as the main reasons why they will leave the PBA.

==== Financial problems ====
Barako Bull was in the financial binge since 2009 after team management admitted that they are having difficulties in making the payroll of the team. The team even requested for a co-sponsorship with Harbour Centre for the duration of the 2010 Fiesta Conference to ease their financial difficulties. Alex Crisano and John Arigo even escalated the issue regarding their delayed salaries to then Commissioner Sonny Barrios. After Crisano went public with his accusations, team management did not renew his contract after the 2009–10 season ended and had difficulty in getting his back pay. Current members also expressed their grievances that their salary and their bonuses were not yet paid since December 2010, with some players as late as August 2010. Commissioner Chito Salud gave guidelines to Barako Bull for them to pay their standing obligations with the team members in lump sum.

==== Attempted sale to Phoenix Petroleum ====
In March 2011, Phoenix Petroleum Philippines, Inc., a petroleum company from the Visayas-Mindanao area expressed interest in acquiring the Barako Bull franchise. For the sale to push through, an approval from the PBA Board of Governors is needed (7 out of 10 votes). However, the sale did not push through after Barako Bull failed to get the necessary number of votes. Reportedly, the San Miguel Corporation, which owns three teams (San Miguel, Barangay Ginebra and B-Meg Derby Ace) in the league shows concerns should the sale will push through, since they also own a petroleum company, Petron Corporation, which is a direct competitor of Phoenix Petroleum. One of the SMC teams, the San Miguel Beermen, was renamed to Petron Blaze Boosters before the start of the Governors Cup; they eventually rebranded back to the Beermen in 2014. It would not be until 2016 when Phoenix successfully joined the PBA as the Phoenix Fuel Masters upon purchasing the assets and personnel of Barako Bull Energy (formerly known as the original FedEx/Air21 Express, not to be confused with the Photokina-owned Barako Bull franchise).

==== Sale of franchise to Lina Group ====
Another buyer, the Lina Group of Companies, which also owns the Air21 Express, announced that they intend to buy the struggling franchise for more than P50 million after the Board of Governors gave Barako Bull until the end of the 2010–11 season to sell its franchise otherwise, they would lose the franchise. The sale was eventually approved by the board on July 8. The team was renamed as the Shopinas.com Clickers, but the name only lasted for one conference before it was rebranded as the second iteration of the Air21 Express. The original Air21 franchise then inherited the Barako Bull name and branding, but has no lineage to the original Photokina-owned franchise.

== Final roster ==
This was the final roster used by the franchise:

Barako Bull Energy Boosters roster
Players
Coaches

Pos.	#	POB	Name	Height	Weight	DOB (YYYY–MM–DD)	From
F	-	(United States)	Vaughn Canta (R)	6 ft 3 in (1.91 m)	210 lb (95 kg)		Cosumnes River
F	-	(Philippines)	Khasim Mirza (R)	6 ft 4 in (1.93 m)	185 lb (84 kg)		UST
C	4	(Philippines)	Mark Andaya	6 ft 8 in (2.03 m)	220 lb (100 kg)		Letran
F	5	(United States)	Wainwright, Robert	6 ft 5 in (1.96 m)	200 lb (91 kg)		Solano CC
F/C	7	(Philippines)	Ken Bono	6 ft 5 in (1.96 m)	220 lb (100 kg)		Adamson
G	9	(Philippines)	Marvin Cruz	5 ft 8 in (1.73 m)	160 lb (73 kg)		UP Diliman
G	12	(Philippines)	Paolo Hubalde	5 ft 9 in (1.75 m)	170 lb (77 kg)		UE
F	15	(Philippines)	Jason Misolas	6 ft 3 in (1.91 m)	195 lb (88 kg)		Letran
G	16	(Philippines)	Borgie Hermida (R)	5 ft 9 in (1.75 m)	160 lb (73 kg)		San Beda
F	20	(Philippines)	Richard Alonzo	6 ft 3 in (1.91 m)	209 lb (95 kg)		Adamson
F	22	(Philippines)	Dennis Daa	6 ft 5 in (1.96 m)	200 lb (91 kg)		Centro Escolar Las Piñas
F	26	(Philippines)	Viray, Bruce	6 ft 3 in (1.91 m)	190 lb (86 kg)		San Sebastian
F	55	(Philippines)	Richard Yee	6 ft 5 in (1.96 m)	205 lb (93 kg)		UST
G	88	(Philippines)	Aries Dimaunahan (C)	5 ft 11 in (1.80 m)	185 lb (84 kg)		UST

Head coach

- (Philippines) Junel Baculi (Mapúa)

Assistant coach(es)

- (Philippines) Raymund Celis (UP Diliman)
- (Philippines) Elmer Bola-bola (Letran)
- (Philippines) Magnum Membrere (Ateneo)

Legend

- (C) Team captain
- (CI) Commissioner's Cup Import
- (GI) Governors' Cup Import
- (EI) EASL Import
- (DP) Unsigned draft pick
- (FA) Free agent
- (IN) Inactive
- (S) Suspended
- (R) Rookie
- Injured

== Season-by-season records ==
Records from the last 3 seasons:

Season	Conference	Elim./Clas. round				Playoffs	
Season	Conference	Finish	W	L	%	Stage	Results
Red Bull Barako
2007–2008	Fiesta Conference	2nd	11	7	.611	Semifinals; 3rd-place playoff	Barangay Ginebra 4, Red Bull 0 Red Bull 102, Magnolia 90*
2008–2009	Philippine Cup	10th	5	13	.278	Did not qualify	
Barako Bull Energy Boosters
2008–2009	Fiesta Conference	10th	2	12	.143	Wildcard phase	Rain or Shine** 96, Barako Bull 88
2009–2010	Philippine Cup	10th	3	15	.167	Did not qualify	
2009–2010	Fiesta Conference	10th	3	15	.167	Did not qualify	
2010–2011	Philippine Cup	10th	3	11	.214	Did not qualify	
Elimination/classification round			27	73	.270	3 post-wildcard appearances	
Playoffs			4	8	.333	0 championships	

*one-game playoffs
**team had twice to beat advantage

== Awards ==
=== Individual awards ===
PBA Most Valuable Player	Finals MVP	PBA Best Player of the Conference
Willie Miller - 2002	Davonn Harp - 2001 Commissioner's; Willie Miller - 2002 Commissioner's; Lordy Tugade - 2005-06 Fiesta	Davonn Harp - 2002 Commissioner's; Enrico Villanueva - 2005-06 Fiesta
PBA Rookie of the Year Award	PBA All-Defensive Team	PBA Mythical First Team
Davonn Harp - 2000; Larry Fonacier - 2005-06	Davonn Harp - 2002; Willie Miller - 2003; Enrico Villanueva - 2004-05; Junthy Valenzuela - 2004-05; Topex Robinson - 2005-06	Willie Miller - 2002; Davonn Harp - 2002; Enrico Villanueva - 2005-06; Lordy Tugade - 2005-06
PBA Mythical Second Team	PBA Most Improved Player	PBA Sportsmanship Award
Davonn Harp - 2001; Cyrus Baguio - 2007-08	Enrico Villanueva - 2004-05; Cyrus Baguio - 2007-08	
PBA Best Import		
Antonio Lang - 2001 Commissioner's; Victor Thomas - 2004 Fiesta		

=== PBA Press Corps Individual Awards ===
Executive of the Year	Baby Dalupan Coach of the Year	Defensive Player of the Year
George Chua - 2002	Yeng Guiao - 2001	Davonn Harp - 2002
Bogs Adornado Comeback Player of the Year	Mr. Quality Minutes	All-Rookie Team
Ato Agustin - 2000; Mike Hrabak - 2007-08		Larry Fonacier - 2005-06; Paolo Bugia - 2005-06; Larry Rodriguez - 2008-09; Rogemar Menor - 2009-10

=== All-Star Weekend ===
All Star Selection	Obstacle Challenge	Slam Dunk Contest
2000: Davonn Harp; Jimwell Torion; 2001: Davonn Harp; Kerby Raymundo; 2003: Willie Miller; Mick Pennisi; Lordy Tugade; Enrico Villanueva; 2004: Davonn Harp; Junthy Valenzuela; 2005: Cyrus Baguio; Enrico Villanueva; 2006: Cyrus Baguio; Enrico Villanueva; 2007: Cyrus Baguio; Larry Fonacier; Enrico Villanueva; 2008: Cyrus Baguio; 2009: Gabby Espinas; Jeff Varem (import)	Topex Robinson - 2005	Cyrus Baguio - 2004

== Notable players ==
=== PBA's 40 Greatest Players in History ===
- Ato Agustin – one of the selected players from the expansion draft in 2000; played for Red Bull from 2000 to 2001.
- Vergel Meneses – played for Red Bull in the 2004–05 season.
- Willie Miller – the first player to be selected first overall in the draft by franchise history; played from 2001 to 2003 and won the 2002 PBA Most Valuable Player Award.
- Kerby Raymundo – selected from the PBL squad; played for the team from 2000 to 2001.

=== Other notable players ===
- Rich Alvarez – played from 2005 to 2008.
- Nelson Asaytono – played for Red Bull from 2002 to 2006.
- Cyrus Baguio – played from 2003 to 2008. Won Most Improved Player in 2008.
- Lowell Briones – played in 2001 for the team
- Paolo Bugia - played from 2005 to 2008. Won a championship with the team.
- Glenn Capacio – selected from the expansion draft in 2000; played in the 2000 season. Became Head Coach of Global Port Batang Pier on the PBA.
- Celino Cruz – played from 2003 to 2008.
- Larry Fonacier – played for team from 2005 to 2007 and was the 2005–2006 Rookie of the Year.
- Davonn Harp – selected from the PBL squad; played for team from 2000 to 2004 before leaving the country due to citizenship issues.
- Vince Hizon – played from 2001 to 2004.
- Mike Hrabak - played from 2005 to 2009. Won Comeback Player of the Year in 2008.
- Noli Locsin – played for Red Bull in 2002.
- Leo Najorda - played from 2005 to 2009. Won a championship in 2005-06.
- Mick Pennisi – played from 2000 to 2008; the last player from the original lineup to play for the team before being traded. Member of all three championship squads.
- Topex Robinson - played from 2003 to 2008. Won as a member of 2005-06 Fiesta Conference championship team and All-Defensive team.
- Larry Rodriguez - played from 2008 to 2009. Won All-Rookie team honors.
- Homer Se - played from 2002 to 2004.
- Carlo Sharma – played from 2006 to 2009.
- Jimwell Torion – selected from the PBL squad; played for the team from 2000 to 2006. Member of all three championship squads.
- Lordy Tugade – selected from the PBL squad. Member of all three championship squads and was awarded the Finals MVP of the 2005–06 Fiesta Conference champion team. Played from 2000 to 2006.
- Junthy Valenzuela – played from 2000 to 2008. Member of all three championship squads.
- Enrico Villanueva – played for team from 2003 to 2007; won Best Player of the Conference and Most Improved player honors during his Red Bull stint.

=== Imports ===
- Thaddeus Delaney – franchise's first-ever import in the 2000 Commissioners Cup.
- Jack Hartmann – import in the 2000 Commissioners Cup.
- Raymund Tutt – played for Red Bull in 2000 and 2001 seasons; holds franchise record of 56 points in one game.
- Antonio Lang – played for Red Bull in 2001 and 2002 seasons; led Red Bull to the 2001 Commissioners Cup titles and was named as the Best Import of the said tournament.
- Joseph Bunn – played for Red Bull in 2002.
- Julius Nwosu – played for Red Bull in 2002; led the team to the 2002 Commissioners Cup title.
- Sean Lampley – played for Red Bull in 2002.
- Scott Burrell – played for Red Bull in 2003; led the team to 10th straight wins upon his arrival
- Victor Thomas – played for Red Bull in 2004; named Best Import of the 2004 Fiesta Conference.
- Dalron Johnson – played for Red Bull in the 2005 Fiesta Conference.
- Earl Barron – played for Red Bull in the 2005 Fiesta Conference before joining the Miami Heat in the 2005–06 season.
- Quemont Greer – played for Red Bull in the 2005–06 Fiesta Conference
- James Penny – replaced Greer in the 2005–06 Fiesta Conference, led the team to the title. Had a second stint in 2007 and helped the team finish 3rd place.
- Adam Parada – played for Red Bull in the 2008 PBA Fiesta Conference. Led the team to a third place finish.
- Cornelius McFadgon – played for Barako Bull in the 2009 PBA Fiesta Conference.
- Jeff Varem – played for Barako Bull in the 2009 PBA Fiesta Conference.
- Daryan Selvy – played for Barako Bull in the 2009 PBA Fiesta Conference.
- Jamaal Williams – played for Barako Bull in the 2009 PBA Fiesta Conference.
- Sammy Monroe – played for Barako Coffee in the 2010 PBA Fiesta Conference.

== Coaches ==
=== PBL ===
- Jimmy Mariano
- Nat Canson
- Gil Lumberio

=== PBA ===
- Yeng Guiao (2000–2009)
- Leo Isaac (2009–2010)
- Junel Baculi (2010–2011)

Awards and achievements
Preceded by San Miguel Beermen	PBA Commissioner's Cup Champions; 2001–2002	Succeeded by Talk 'N Text Tropang Texters
Preceded by San Miguel Beermen	PBA Fiesta Conference Champions; 2005–2006	Succeeded by Alaska Aces
