= 1999 Mobiline Phone Pals season =

- Head coach: Eric Altamirano
- General manager: Nick Dela Paz; Debbie Tan (assistant)
- Owner: Pilipino Telephone Corporation

All-Filipino results
- Record: 11–7 (61.1%)
- Place: 1st seed
- Playoff finish: Quarterfinals (lost to Ginebra)

Commissioner's Cup results
- Record: 3–6 (33.3%)
- Place: 8th seed
- Playoff finish: Quarterfinals (lost to Alaska)

Governors' Cup results
- Record: 4–6 (40%)
- Place: 7th seed
- Playoff finish: Quarterfinals (lost to Tanduay)

Mobiline Phone Pals seasons

The 1999 Mobiline Phone Pals season was the 10th season of the franchise in the Philippine Basketball Association (PBA).

== Draft picks ==
Round	Pick	Player	Nationality	College
1	4	Bryan Gahol	Philippines	UP
2	11	Renato Alforque	Philippines	UV

=== Direct hire ===
Player	Nationality	College
Asi Taulava	Tonga	BYU Hawaii

== Summary ==
Rookie Fil-Tongan 6-10 Paul Asi Taulava debut with a near triple-double of 32 points, 20 rebounds and 8 assists as Mobiline rout comebacking Tanduay Gold Rhum Masters, 90-64, in the opening of the league's 25th season on February 7. The Phone Pals had their best start in franchise history by winning their first seven games. Mobiline finish on top of the standings in the All-Filipino Cup with an 11-5 won-loss slate and seeded number one with a twice-to-beat advantage against Barangay Ginebra Kings in the quarterfinal round. The Phone Pals were upset and lost two straight in which the last one was a heartbreaking 81-82 defeat on Bal David' winning shot at the buzzer.

Last season's Governors Cup best import Silas Mills return to the Phone Pals in the Commissioner's Cup. Mobiline lost their first two games before picking up their win against Shell, 78-74 in Sta.Cruz, Laguna on July 7. The Phone Pals were three wins and five losses and seeded 8th and last in the quarterfinal round, they lost to top-seeded Alaska Milkmen.

Reinforced by former San Miguel import Larry Robinson in the Governors Cup, the Phone Pals had a similar three wins in eight elimination round assignments, they forced a sudden-death playoff with 2nd seeded Tanduay Rhum Masters before losing, 75-84 on November 17.

== Occurrences ==
In Mobiline's first game on July 11 following the Andy Seigle-Jerry Codinera trade, rookie Asi Taulava played listless in scoring only six points and was fined for his below-par showing in a 74-103 loss to Sta.Lucia.

== Roster ==
1999 Mobiline Phone Pals roster
Players

Pos.	#	POB	Name	Height	Weight	DOB (YYYY–MM–DD)	From
G	3	(Philippines)	Tonyboy Espinosa	5 ft 7 in (1.70 m)			De La Salle
G	8	(Philippines)	Al Solis	6 ft 0 in (1.83 m)			Visayas
G/F	9	(Philippines)	Jose Francisco	6 ft 1 in (1.85 m)			Far Eastern
G	11	(Philippines)	Anastacio Mendoza	5 ft 9 in (1.75 m)			Far Eastern
G	12	(Philippines)	Glenn Capacio	6 ft 2 in (1.88 m)			Far Eastern
F	14	(Philippines)	Enrique Reyes	6 ft 3 in (1.91 m)			Ateneo
G	17	(Philippines)	Patrick Fran	6 ft 0 in (1.83 m)			UST
F	21	(Philippines)	Bryan Gahol	6 ft 5 in (1.96 m)			Sonoma State
F	22	(Philippines)	Jeffrey Cariaso	6 ft 2 in (1.88 m)			Philippines
F	29	(Philippines)	Josel Angeles	6 ft 2 in (1.88 m)			Lyceum
F/C	44	(Philippines)	Jerry Codinera	6 ft 5 in (1.96 m)			UE
C	55	(Tonga)	Asi Taulava	6 ft 9 in (2.06 m)			BYU–Hawaii

Coaches

Head coach

- (Philippines) Eric Altamirano

Assistant coach(es)

- (Philippines) Frankie Lim
- (Philippines) Ryan Gregorio
- (Philippines) Bong Go

Legend

- (C) Team captain
- Injured

== Transactions ==
=== Trades ===
Off-season	To Barangay Ginebra Merwin Castelo	To Mobiline Anastacio Mendoza ^{Drafted by Ginebra, 2nd overall pick}
July 1999	To Purefoods Andy Seigle	To Mobiline Jerry Codiñera

=== Recruited imports ===
Tournament	Name	Number	Position	University/College
Commissioner's Cup	Silas Mills	1	Forward	Utah State
Governors' Cup	Larry Robinson	20	Guard-Forward	Centenary
