= 1999 San Miguel Beermen season =

- Head coach: Jong Uichico
- General manager: Nazario Avendaño
- Owner: San Miguel Corporation

All-Filipino Cup results
- Record: 8–9 (47.1%)
- Place: 5th seed
- Playoff finish: QF (lost to Shell)

Commissioner's Cup results
- Record: 13–7 (65%)
- Place: 4th seed
- Playoff finish: Champions (def. Formula Shell 4-2)

Governors Cup results
- Record: 14–4 (77.8%)
- Place: 3rd seed
- Playoff finish: Champions (def. Alaska 4-2)

San Miguel Beermen seasons

The 1999 San Miguel Beermen season was the 25th season of the franchise in the Philippine Basketball Association (PBA).

== Draft picks ==
Round	Pick	Player	Nationality	College
3	21	Rommel Daep	Philippines	SSC
3	22	Victor Pambuan	United States	Ohlone College

=== Direct hire ===
Player	Nationality	College
Danny Seigle	United States	Wagner

== Occurrences ==
The San Miguel team gave away its rights to four of their players namely Allan Caidic, Edward Naron, Elpidio Villamin and Siot Tanquingcen and shipped them to sister team Ginebra San Miguel.

Assistant coach Jong Uichico takes over from Ron Jacobs as the new head coach of the San Miguel Beermen beginning the league's 25th season.

Former Mobiline import Terquin Mott was acquired by San Miguel in the Commissioner's Cup. The Beermen agreed to give away their rights to Larry Robinson, their import in the Governors Cup for the past two seasons in exchange, Robinson will start playing for the Phone Pals in the Governors Cup.

== Notable dates ==
March 14: Nelson Asaytono scored his team's last four points as San Miguel toppled Mobiline, 65-64, in a nail-biting duel and accomplished what seven other teams failed to do, giving the Phone Pals their first loss in the season after posting seven straight wins. The Beermen scored their fourth win in seven outings.

July 4: Terquin Mott's defensive intensity rubbed off on his fellow starters as the Beermen held the Gin Kings of Ginebra scoreless in a five-minute spell down the stretch and San Miguel notched its second straight win in the Commissioner's Cup with an 85-75 victory.

== Two championships ==
The Beermen finally prevailed over the Alaska Milkmen, their two-time finals opponent last season, this time in the best-of-five semifinals in the Commissioner's Cup. San Miguel won the series by taking the deciding Game five, 84–73 on August 29.

San Miguel battled Formula Shell for the Commissioners Cup trophy, the Beermen stopped the Zoom Masters' title run, who were looking for their third straight crown. The Beermen finally ended a five-year title-drought by winning their 12th championship in a 4–2 series win. Coach Jong Uichico won his first PBA title in only his second conference.

Lamont Strothers returns as their import in the Governors Cup. The Beermen posted a 6–2 won-loss slate in the eliminations and seeded third. They easily made it to the best-of-five semifinal series against Tanduay Gold Rhum by ousting sixth seeded Sta.Lucia Realtors. The Beermen scored a 3–0 sweep over the Rhum Masters to advance into the finals against the Alaska Milkmen, which also scored a three-game sweep over Purefoods.

The last championship of the 1990s features the two winningest ballclubs in the last 12 years and a match-up of two of the finest imports in recent years, Lamont Strothers and Sean Chambers. The Beermen were gunning for their 13th title and hoping to avenged their two finals losses to Alaska last season. San Miguel trailed 1–2 in the series after losing Games two and three. In a must-win situation, the Beermen won Game four, 76–65 on December 5. Five nights later, the Beermen controlled the game for most of the way and survived a late rally by Alaska to win, 74–68 in Game five. Needed only one more win to clinch their 13th league championship, the Beermen took Game six, 72–69 at the Big Dome on December 12 and won the series, four games to two. The finals victory by San Miguel tied them with the disbanded Crispa Redmanizers' record for most PBA titles.

== Awards ==
- Danny Seigle won the season's Rookie of the Year honors
- Terquin Mott was named the Commissioner's Cup Best Import
- Lamont Strothers was named the Governors Cup Best Import.

== Roster ==
1999 San Miguel Beermen roster
Players

Pos.	#	POB	Name	Height	Weight	DOB (YYYY–MM–DD)	From
G	1	(Philippines)	Boybits Victoria	5 ft 11 in (1.80 m)	172 lb (78 kg)		San Beda
F	3	(United States)	Nic Belasco	6 ft 6 in (1.98 m)	210 lb (95 kg)		Notre Dame (OH)
C	5	(Philippines)	Ronilo Padilla	6 ft 6 in (1.98 m)	215 lb (98 kg)		Cebu
G	7	(Philippines)	Michael Mustre	6 ft 0 in (1.83 m)	180 lb (82 kg)		Letran
C	10	(Philippines)	Danny Ildefonso	6 ft 6 in (1.98 m)	210 lb (95 kg)		National-U
G/F	15	(Philippines)	Dwight Lago	6 ft 2 in (1.88 m)	190 lb (86 kg)		De La Salle
G	17	(Philippines)	Olsen Racela	5 ft 10 in (1.78 m)	165 lb (75 kg)		Ateneo
G	18	(Philippines)	Art Dela Cruz	6 ft 3 in (1.91 m)	210 lb (95 kg)		San Sebastian
C	24	(Philippines)	Cris Bolado	6 ft 7 in (2.01 m)	260 lb (118 kg)		National-U
F	25	(Philippines)	Freddie Abuda	6 ft 4 in (1.93 m)	200 lb (91 kg)		Cebu
G	32	(United States)	Rob Duat	6 ft 3 in (1.91 m)	200 lb (91 kg)		Menlo
F	42	(United States)	Danny Seigle	6 ft 6 in (1.98 m)	2,005 lb (909 kg)		Wagner

Coaches

Head coach

- (Philippines) Jong Uichico

Assistant coach(es)

- (Philippines) Jojo Villa

Team manager

- (Philippines) Nazario Avendaño

Legend

- (C) Team captain
- Injured

== Transactions ==
=== Trades ===
July 10, 1999	To Pop Cola 800s Cris Bolado	To San Miguel Beermen Boybits Victoria
August 1999	To Pop Cola 800s Nelson Asaytono, William Antonio	To San Miguel Beermen Nic Belasco, Cris Bolado, Dwight Lago

=== Additions ===
Player	Signed	Former team
Robert Duat	Off-season	Cebu Gems (MBA)

=== Recruited imports ===
Tournament	Name	Number	Position	University/College
Commissioner's Cup	Terquin Mott	40	Forward	Coppin State
Governors' Cup	Lamont Strothers	6	Forward-Guard	Christopher Newport
