= 1999 Shell Velocity season =

- Head coach: Perry Ronquillo
- Owner(s): Pilipinas Shell Petroleum Corporation

All-Filipino Cup results
- Record: 17–9 (65.4%)
- Place: 4th seed
- Playoff finish: Champions (def. Tanduay)

Commissioner's Cup results
- Record: 11–10 (52.4%)
- Place: 2nd seed
- Playoff finish: Runner-up (San Miguel 2-4)

Governor's Cup results
- Record: 4–5 (44.4%)
- Place: 5th seed
- Playoff finish: QF (lost to Alaska)

Shell Velocity seasons

The 1999 Shell Velocity season was the 15th season of the franchise in the Philippine Basketball Association (PBA). Known as Formula Shell Zoom Masters in the All-Filipino and Commissioner's Cup.

== Draft picks ==
Round	Pick	Player	Nationality	College
1	3	Erwin Luna	Philippines	Adamson
1	7	Arnold Rodriguez	Philippines	PUP
2	12	Dennis Harrison	United States	Hawaii

== Championship / Runner-up ==
The Shell Zoom Masters won their first two games of the season but dropped to two wins and five losses after a five-game losing streak. Shell got back into contention in the All-Filipino Cup by winning seven of their last nine outings to finish in a tie with Alaska and Tanduay at second place in the team standings and seeded fourth with a twice-to-beat advantage in the quarterfinals.

Shell makes it to the semifinals by defeating San Miguel Beermen, 79-73. The Zoom Masters surprisingly scored a 3-0 sweep off Barangay Ginebra in the best-of-five semifinal series and didn't allow the Gin Kings to pull an upset like they did against Mobiline twice. Formula Shell is in the finals for the second straight conference and will play the Tanduay Rhum Masters, who were led by the fearsome duo of Fil-Am rookies Eric Menk and Sonny Alvarado. Behind the likes of Benjie Paras, Victor Pablo, Chris Jackson and point guard Gerry Esplana, Shell spoiled Tanduay's bid for a cinderella finish as the Zoom Masters emerge victorious with a 4-2 series win to repeat as back-to-back champions and becoming the 10th team to win the prestigious All-Filipino Cup trophy.

John Best is playing in his fifth conference as Shell rehired his services as their import in the Commissioner's Cup. The Zoom Masters made it to the finals for the third straight conference by winning their best-of-five semifinal series against Sta.Lucia, three games to two. The Zoom Masters played opposite the San Miguel Beermen in the championship and lost in six games and had to settle for runner-up honors this time.

== Notable dates ==
March 19: The Zoom Masters finally end a five-game losing streak with a 64-60 victory over Sta.Lucia and improved its win–loss record to 3–5. Jun Marzan's pesky defense paid off at the right time while Noy Castillo scored the crucial baskets.

March 24: Shell notched its fourth win in nine games with a 68-58 victory over San Miguel Beermen. Victor Pablo scored 20 points and Benjie Paras added 17 points with 13 rebounds and two block shots.

July 2: John Best redeemed himself from two free throw misses with two conversions in the next play as Shell frustrated Kwan Johnson, Robert Parker and the new-look Sta.Lucia with a 94-90 victory.

== Occurrences ==
In Game two of the Shell-Ginebra semifinals series in the All-Filipino Cup, a brawl ensued involving Shell's Jay Mendoza and Ginebra's Wilmer Ong. The free-for-all meted a total fines of P 235,000 and suspension of players involved, Jay Mendoza was fined P 40,000 and suspended for three games.

== Award ==
Benjie Paras won his second Most Valuable Player (MVP) trophy after 10 years since winning both the MVP plum and Rookie of the year honors.

== Roster ==
1999 Shell Velocity roster
Players

Pos.	#	POB	Name	Height	Weight	DOB (YYYY–MM–DD)	From
G	1	(United States)	Dennis Harrison	6 ft 2 in (1.88 m)			Hawaiʻi
F	3	(United States)	Chris Jackson	6 ft 4 in (1.93 m)			San Bernardino Valley
G	4	(United States)	Noy Castillo	6 ft 0 in (1.83 m)			The Citadel
G	6	(Philippines)	Arnold Rodriguez	6 ft 1 in (1.85 m)			PUP
F	8	(Philippines)	Jojo Lim	6 ft 3 in (1.91 m)			Visayas
F	9	(Philippines)	Jay Mendoza	6 ft 4 in (1.93 m)			Mapúa
C	11	(Philippines)	Erwin Luna	6 ft 7 in (2.01 m)			Adamson
G	12	(Philippines)	Porferio Marzan	6 ft 2 in (1.88 m)			Baguio
C	14	(Philippines)	Benjie Paras	6 ft 5 in (1.96 m)			Philippines
F	19	(Philippines)	Joel Dualan	6 ft 3 in (1.91 m)			Manila
G	30	(Philippines)	Gerry Esplana	5 ft 11 in (1.80 m)			Far Eastern
G	31	(United States)	Rommel Santos	5 ft 11 in (1.80 m)			Staten Island
F	33	(Philippines)	Victor Pablo	6 ft 4 in (1.93 m)			Far Eastern

Coaches
Head coach
- (Philippines) Perry Ronquillo
Assistant(s)
- (Philippines) Joey Guanio

Legend
- (DP) Unsigned draft pick
- (FA) Free agent
- (S) Suspended
- Injured

=== Recruited imports ===
Tournament	Name	Number	Position	University/College
Commissioner's Cup	John Best	25	Forward	Tennessee Tech
Governors' Cup	Lester Neal	24	Forward	Ventura College
Governors' Cup	Bobby Parks	22	Forward	Memphis
Governors' Cup	John Morton	23	Forward	Seton Hall
