= Bal David =

Filipino basketball player

Personal information
- Born: August 23, 1972 (age 54) Quezon City, Philippines
- Listed height: 5 ft 9 in (1.75 m)

Career information
- College: UST
- PBA draft: 1995: 3rd round, 22nd overall pick
- Drafted by: Sunkist Orange Juicers
- Playing career: 1996–2005
- Position: Point guard
- Number: 1

Career history

Playing
- 1996–2005: Ginebra San Miguel / Gordon's Gin Boars / Barangay Ginebra Kings

Coaching
- 2022: UST

Career highlights
- 2× PBA champion (1997 Commissioner's, 2004 Fiesta); 4x PBA All-Star (1996–1999); PBA Mythical Second Team (1996); PBA All-Star Game MVP (1997); PBA Buzzerbeater Event Co-Champion w/ Rodney Santos (1999); 2× UAAP champion (1993, 1994)

Bal Viray David Jr. (born August 23, 1972) is a Filipino former professional basketball coach and former player. He played his whole 10-year career for the Barangay Ginebra Kings of the Philippine Basketball Association (PBA). He last coached the UST Growling Tigers of the University Athletic Association of the Philippines (UAAP).

== Amateur career ==
David was a standout for the University of Santo Tomas (UST), leading the Growling Tigers to the 1994 UAAP men's basketball championship. His field-goal at the dying seconds of Game 3 allowed the Tigers to defeat the De La Salle Green Archers 2–1 in the championship series.

David also participated in the amateur Philippine Basketball League playing for Stag Pale Pilseners. Stag won several championships, the last of which was in 1997 where they won the Danny Floro Cup. David had three steals in the deciding game that gave Stag the championship.

== Professional career ==
David signed up for the Ginebra San Miguel, where he was joined by Stag teammate Marlou Aquino who was picked first overall by Ginebra in the 1996 PBA Draft.

In the 1996 Commissioner's Cup, Ginebra barged into the semifinals, facing the Shell Turbo Chargers. In the series that went into the deciding game, David converted a three-point field goal to break the 83-all deadlock. However, Richie Ticzon scored his own three-pointer for Shell; in the ensuing play Kenny Redfield blocked Vince Hizon's shot, which led to Redfield's three-pointer to eliminate Ginebra from contention. Ginebra, now sporting the team name Gordon's Gin Boars, David entered the 1997 Commissioner's Cup Finals against the Alaska Milkmen; the Boars won over the Milkmen in six games, with the title-clinching Game 6 won via a 105–79 rout.

In the 1999 PBA All-Filipino Cup quarterfinals, he made an off-balance game-winner shot against Asi Taulava-led Mobiline Phone Pals which was one of the biggest upsets in the history of PBA. However, the team was defeated by Formula Shell in the semifinals.

== PBA career statistics ==
Legend
GP	Games played	MPG	Minutes per game
FG%	Field-goal percentage	3P%	3-point field-goal percentage	FT%	Free-throw percentage
RPG	Rebounds per game	APG	Assists per game	SPG	Steals per game
BPG	Blocks per game	PPG	Points per game	**Bold**	Career high

=== Season-by-season averages ===
Year	Team	GP	MPG	FG%	3P%	FT%	RPG	APG	SPG	BPG	PPG
1996	Ginebra	64	23.5	.429	.315	.734	2.8	4.3	1.0	.1	8.6
1997	Gordon's Gin	**68**	29.1	.486	.197	.784	3.4	**5.3**	.9	**.2**	10.3
1998	Gordon's Gin / Ginebra	49	26.1	**.602**	.237	.702	3.0	4.2	1.3	.1	8.9
1999	Barangay Ginebra	41	**40.1**	.397	.336	.846	**4.9**	5.0	1.2	.1	**12.0**
2000	Barangay Ginebra	37	35.4	.395	**.341**	.733	3.9	3.8	**1.4**	**.2**	9.8
2001	Barangay Ginebra	51	26.3	.380	.298	.812	2.6	3.2	.7	.1	8.4
2002	Barangay Ginebra	27	23.7	.349	.295	**.917**	2.1	2.6	.6	.0	7.3
2003	Barangay Ginebra	39	30.6	.400	.340	.814	2.3	4.3	.7	.1	6.5
2004–05	Barangay Ginebra	22	22.4	.364	.235	.857	1.6	3.5	.8	.1	3.4
Career		398	28.6	.430	.300	.772	3.1	4.2	1.0	.1	8.8

== Coaching career ==
David first got into coaching in 2010 when he handled the Fern-C franchise in the Philippine Basketball League (PBL). He then joined the coaching staff of the PBA D-League team the Liver Marin Guardians in 2015 that was headed by former teammate Rodney Santos.

David was then hired as his alma mater's head coach in 2022. In his only season with UST during Season 85, they finished with only one win in 14 games. He resigned in 2023.

== Coaching record ==
=== Collegiate career ===
Season	Team	Elimination round					Playoffs				
Season	Team	GP	W	L	PCT	Finish	PG	W	L	PCT	Results
2022	UST	14	1	13	.071	8th	–	–	–	–	Eliminated
Totals		14	1	13	.071		0	0	0	.000	0 championships

Sporting positions
Preceded by Jino Manansala	UST Growling Tigers men's basketball head coach 2022	Succeeded by Pido Jarencio
