= 1999 Purefoods Tender Juicy Hotdogs season =

- Head coach: Derrick Pumaren
- General manager: Rene Pardo
- Owner: Purefoods Corporation

All-Filipino Cup results
- Record: 7–9 (43.8%)
- Place: 7th seed
- Playoff finish: N/A

Commissioner's Cup results
- Record: 3–5 (37.5%)
- Place: 7th seed
- Playoff finish: N/A

Governors Cup results
- Record: 8–5 (61.5%)
- Place: 1st seed
- Playoff finish: Semis (lost to Alaska)

Purefoods Tender Juicy Hotdogs seasons

The 1999 Purefoods Tender Juicy Hotdogs season was the 12th season of the franchise in the Philippine Basketball Association (PBA).

== Draft pick ==
Round	Pick	Player	Nationality	College
1	5	Richard Yee	Philippines	UST

=== Direct hire ===
Player	Nationality	College
Alvarado Segova	United States	UCO

== Occurrences ==
Rene Pardo was appointed as team manager, while former Pepsi and Sunkist coach Derrick Pumaren is the new head coach of the team beginning the league's 25th season, Pumaren replaces Chito Narvasa on the Purefoods bench. Pardo will stay as manager until 2005 to be the full-time governor of the team.

Seven games into the All-Filipino Cup eliminations, Purefoods' direct-hire recruit, Fil-American Alvarado Segova played his first game against Barangay Ginebra Kings. Segova didn't last long in the league and was soon deported after being found out to be a fake Filipino.

== Roster ==
1999 Purefoods Tender Juicy Hotdogs roster
Players

Pos.	#	POB	Name	Height	Weight	DOB (YYYY–MM–DD)	From
F	1	(United States)	Alvarado Segova	6 ft 6 in (1.98 m)			Central Oklahoma
F	2	(Philippines)	Richard Yee	6 ft 4 in (1.93 m)			UST
G	4	(Philippines)	Jessie Cabanayan	5 ft 8 in (1.73 m)			Baguio
F	5	(Philippines)	Edmund Reyes	6 ft 3 in (1.91 m)			UST
G	6	(Philippines)	Boyet Fernandez	5 ft 8 in (1.73 m)			San Agustin
F	7	(Philippines)	Rey Evangelista	6 ft 3 in (1.91 m)			UST
G	8	(Philippines)	Genesis Sasuman	5 ft 11 in (1.80 m)			Letran
G	10	(Philippines)	Dindo Pumaren	5 ft 9 in (1.75 m)			De La Salle
C	11	(Philippines)	Edward Joseph Feihl	7 ft 1 in (2.16 m)			Adamson
F	16	(Philippines)	Alvin Patrimonio	6 ft 3 in (1.91 m)			Mapúa
G	24	(Philippines)	Rommel Daep	6 ft 2 in (1.88 m)			San Sebastian
C	52	(United States)	Andy Seigle	6 ft 9 in (2.06 m)			New Orleans

Coaches
Head coach
- (Philippines) Derrick Pumaren
Assistant(s)
- (Philippines) Gee Abanilla
- (Philippines) Agustin Tiongco

Legend
- (DP) Unsigned draft pick
- (FA) Free agent
- (S) Suspended
- Injured

== Transactions ==
=== Additions ===
Player	Signed	Former team
Jesse Cabanayan	Off-season	Pop Cola
Rommel Daep	Off-season	N/A

=== Trades ===
July 1999	To Mobiline Jerry Codiñera	To Purefoods Andy Seigle
October 1999	To Pop Cola Henry Fernandez	To Purefoods Boyet Fernandez

=== Recruited imports ===
Tournament	Name	Number	Position	Nationality	University/College
Commissioner's Cup	Julius Nwosu	12	Center-Forward	Nigeria	Liberty University
Governors' Cup	Derrick Brown	32	Guard-Forward	United States	Providence College
