= Fil-sham controversy =

Philippine Basketball Association eligibility issue

The Fil-sham controversy refers to a player eligibility issue which affected the Philippine Basketball Association (PBA), the top-flight and professional basketball league in the Philippines in the early 2000s. The eligibility of certain Filipinos with foreign heritage to play in the league has been disputed which led the PBA to place more restriction on Filipinos born overseas and/or of foreign descent.

== Background ==
The Philippine Basketball Association (PBA) saw an influx of Filipino players of foreign descent or Filipino-foreigners in the late-1990s. The dissolution of the Metropolitan Basketball Association in 2002, meant that PBA was the only league where Filipino-foreigners wanting to play in the Philippines could play. Many of these players were Filipino-Americans, who were also referred to as "Fil-ams". Players who were alleged to have falsified proof of their Filipino heritage were pejoratively branded as "Fil-shams".

One early notable case was that of Sonny Alvarado, the top-overall pick in the 1999 PBA draft who claimed to be Filipino and Puerto Rican descent, who went on to becoming a key player for the Tanduay Rhum Masters. Alvarado claims Filipino heritage from his mother. In September 1999, Senator Robert Jaworski called for an inquiry to look into Filipino-foreigners who may have falsified their Filipino citizenship documents responding to allegations raised by his colleague Robert Barbers. Alvarado was among those implicated but was cleared in January 2000. However the Bureau of Immigration reopened Alvarado's case and ordered for his deportation after concluding that he had falsified his mother's citizenship documents. Two of Tanduay's semifinal games in the 2000 PBA All-Filipino Cup which featured Alvarado were voided as a consequence.

The issue persisted in the early 2000s, with the eligibility of certain Filipino-foreigners to play in the PBA was put into question particularly their heritage by locally based Filipino players. In 2002, the PBA Players' Association, led by Jojo Lastimosa in a Senate inquiry led by Barbers, claimed that ten out of 25 Filipino-foreigners playing in the PBA at that time were fake though the group did not publicly disclosed the identities of the players during the inquiry. PBA commissioner Noli Eala formed a five-member committee to tackle the issue which has been attributed to the declining popularity of the league.

== Associated players ==
The following players have been implicated with the controversy.

Name	Non-Filipino nationality (Note: Associated FIBA nationality of non-Filipino citizenship. May or may not be a holder of Filipino citizenship.)	National team player (Note: Has played for the Philippine national basketball team at any point of their career.)	Status (Note: Eligibility to play as a Filipino-foreigner in the PBA. May have or may not have featured in league games. Unproven eligibility may mean failing to satisfy documentary requirements and not necessarily reflective of one's status as Filipino citizen.)	Notes	Reference
Sonny Alvarado	Puerto Rico; United States	No	Unproven eligibility	Claimed Filipino heritage from his mother. The Bureau of Immigration ruled he had falsified his mother's birth document.	
Davonn Harp	United States	No	Cleared	Last played in the PBA in 2005. The Department of Justice later affirmed his Filipino citizenship in 2009.	
Jon Ordonio	United States	No	Cleared	Has a Filipino mother. Was cleared by the Department of Justice, but then was accused of forging his documents. Left the country in 2004.	
Ali Peek	United States	No	Cleared	Has a Filipino mother who resides in California. He is good friends with Jojo Lastimosa who actively campaigned against "Fil-shams".	
Asi Taulava	Tonga	Yes	Cleared	Was deported from the Philippines in 2000 but was able to be reinstated the following year. His citizenship was again subject to dispute in 2004.	

== Aftermath and legacy ==
The Tanduay Rhum Masters, who signed in Sonny Alvarado in 1999, sold its franchise to FedEx Express (now Barako Bull Energy) in 2001. Eventually some of the Filipino-foreigners were able to prove their eligibility. As a response the PBA required Filipino-foreigners born outside the Philippines aspiring to join the PBA documents from the Bureau of Immigration (BI) and the Department of Justice (DOJ) affirming their Filipino heritage as early as the PBA Developmental League. A quota on foreign-born Filipinos were also imposed.

This led to peculiar cases such as CJ Perez who played high school and college basketball in the Philippines but was considered as a Filipino-foreigner since he was born in Hong Kong, and the Ganuelas-Rosser brothers Matt and Brandon. Matt, the older of the two did not have to secure documents from the BI and DOJ since he was born in Olongapo while the younger brother had to since he was born in the United States.

The PBA relaxed its rules on foreign-born Filipinos in November 2021, only requiring them a Philippine passport to join the PBA draft.
