= 1999 Pop Cola 800s season =

- Head coach: Norman Black
- General Manager: Elmer Yanga
- Owner(s): RFM Corporation

All-Filipino Cup results
- Record: 7–10 (41.2%)
- Place: 6th seed
- Playoff finish: QF (lost to Tanduay)

Commissioner's Cup results
- Record: 1–7 (12.5%)
- Place: N/A
- Playoff finish: N/A

Governor's Cup results
- Record: 0–8 (0%)
- Place: N/A
- Playoff finish: N/A

Pop Cola 800s seasons

The 1999 Pop Cola 800s season was the 10th season of the franchise in the Philippine Basketball Association (PBA).

== Draft pick ==
| Round | Pick | Player | Nationality | College |
|---|---|---|---|---|
| 1 | 6 | Ruel Buenaventura | Philippines | UE |

=== Direct hire ===
| Player | Nationality | College |
|---|---|---|
| Jon Ordonio | United States | The Master's University |

== Summary ==
The 800s were five wins and three losses after the first round of eliminations in the All-Filipino Cup. Pop Cola lost four straight games at the start of the second round and finish with an overall 7-9 won-loss slate. Seeded at sixth in the quarterfinals and needed to win twice in order to advance in the semifinal playoffs, Pop Cola lost to Tanduay, 77-91.

Pop Cola's original choice for an import, Fil-American Joe Hooks was replaced and never got a chance to play in the Commissioner's Cup. The 800s bring in Galen Robinson, who lasted three games and failed to give Pop Cola a victory and his replacement was Jevon Crudup. Winless in four starts with Vergel Meneses moving to Barangay Ginebra in a trade with Noli Locsin, Pop Cola finally scored their first win against Shell on July 18 in a low-scoring contest, 54-52. Crudup also lasted three games and was sent home in favor of Tremaine Fowlkes in the 800s' last two assignments in the eliminations which they lost.

Coach Norman Black's woes continues in the Governors Cup as Pop Cola failed to win a single game in all their eight matches in the eliminations. The RFM ballclub had their worst season since their first year in 1990 as an expansion franchise.

== Roster ==
1999 Pop Cola 800s roster
Players

| Pos. | # | POB | Name | Height | Weight | DOB (YYYY–MM–DD) | From |
|---|---|---|---|---|---|---|---|
| G | 1 | (United States) | Jon Ordonio | 6 ft 2 in (1.88 m) | | | Master's |
| C | 2 | (United States) | Ali Peek | 6 ft 4 in (1.93 m) | | | Saint Mary's |
| F | 5 | (United States) | Brixter Encarnacion | 6 ft 4 in (1.93 m) | | | San Sebastian |
| F | 6 | (Philippines) | Noli Locsin | 6 ft 3 in (1.91 m) | | | De La Salle |
| G | 7 | (Philippines) | Jasper Ocampo | 5 ft 10 in (1.78 m) | | | San Sebastian |
| F | 11 | (Philippines) | Nelson Asaytono | 6 ft 3 in (1.91 m) | | | Manila |
| C | 16 | (Philippines) | Ruel Buenaventura | 6 ft 5 in (1.96 m) | | | UE |
| F | 22 | (Philippines) | Henry Fernandez | 6 ft 1 in (1.85 m) | | | Visayas |
| G | 34 | (United States) | William Antonio | 6 ft 3 in (1.91 m) | | | Chaminade |
| C | 35 | (Philippines) | Zaldy Realubit | 6 ft 6 in (1.98 m) | | | USJ–R |
| F | | (Philippines) | Marcelino Morelos | 6 ft 2 in (1.88 m) | | | UE |

Coaches

Head coach

- (United States) Norman Black

Assistant coach(es)

- (Philippines) Franz Pumaren

Legend

- (C) Team captain
- Injured

== Transactions ==
=== Trades ===
| Off-season | To San Miguel Beermen Boybits Victoria | To Pop Cola 800s Cris Bolado |
| July 10, 1999 | To Barangay Ginebra Kings Vergel Meneses | To Pop Cola 800s Noli Locsin |
| August 1999 | To San Miguel Beermen Nic Belasco, Cris Bolado, Dwight Lago | To Pop Cola 800s Nelson Asaytono, William Antonio |
| September 1999 | To Purefoods TJ Hotdogs Boyet Fernandez | To Pop Cola 800s Henry Fernandez |

=== Recruited imports ===
| Tournament | Name | Number | Position | University/College |
|---|---|---|---|---|
| Commissioner's Cup | Galen Robinson | 6 | Center | University of Houston |
| Commissioner's Cup | Jevon Crudup | 8 | Forward | University of Missouri |
| Commissioner's Cup | Tremaine Fowlkes | 8 | Forward | CSU-Fresno |
| Governors' Cup | Shawn Harvey | 31 | Guard | West Virginia State |
| Governors' Cup | Dexter Boney | 24 | Guard | UNLV |
