= 1999 Sta. Lucia Realtors season =

- Head coach: Adonis Tierra
- Owner: Sta. Lucia Realty and Development Corporation

All-Filipino Cup results
- Record: 6–11 (35.3%)
- Place: last
- Playoff finish: N/A

Commissioner's Cup results
- Record: 8–8 (50%)
- Place: 3rd seed
- Playoff finish: SF (lost to Shell)

Governor's Cup results
- Record: 3–6 (33.3%)
- Place: 6th seed
- Playoff finish: QF (lost to SMB)

Sta. Lucia Realtors seasons

The 1999 Sta.Lucia Realtors season was the 7th season of the franchise in the Philippine Basketball Association (PBA).

== Draft pick ==
Round	Pick	Player	Nationality	College
2	10	Gerard Francisco	Philippines	UST

=== Direct hire ===
Player	Nationality	College
Robert Parker	United States	Hawaii Pacific

== Occurrences ==
Assistant coach Adonis Tierra signed a two-year deal to be promoted back as coach of the Realtors, replacing Derrick Pumaren, who moved over to Purefoods.

In the Commissioner's Cup, the Realtors had Kwan Johnson as their import and along with the signing of their direct-hire recruit, Fil-Am Rob Parker, their tandem nearly led Sta.Lucia to their first finals appearance in the Commissioner's Cup when they lead the best-of-five semifinal series against Formula Shell, two games to one, only to lose the last two matches.

Prior to the start of the Governor's Cup, a senate hearing was conducted on the ongoing investigation regarding the fake Fil-foreigners playing in the league, the flamboyant Rob Parker with the possibility of being deported, breached his contract and suddenly left the team unnoticed. The Realtors retain Kwan Johnson but soon replaced him with Joseph Temple, who was one of their imports from last season.

== Notable dates ==
March 26: Dennis Espino delivered the clutch baskets in the stretch as the Realtors scored an 82-73 victory over Barangay Ginebra Kings in their first assignment in the second round of eliminations of the All-Filipino Cup. Sta.Lucia survived a third quarter run by the Gin Kings and took its third win in nine outings.

July 11: The Realtors dealt Mobiline its worst loss with a 103-74 victory to finally barge into the win column and spoiled Jerry Codiñera's debut with the Phone Pals. While Kwan Johnson registered his first triple-double of 22 points, 11 rebounds and 10 assists in the Commissioner's Cup tournament.

July 18: Sta.Lucia scored its second victory in five outings with an 88-78 win over Baranagay Ginebra Kings.

== Roster ==
1999 Sta. Lucia Realtors roster
Players

Pos.	#	POB	Name	Height	Weight	DOB (YYYY–MM–DD)	From
G	2	(Philippines)	Eugene Quilban	5 ft 7 in (1.70 m)			San Sebastian
G	4	(Philippines)	Gerardo Santiago	5 ft 10 in (1.78 m)			Mapúa
G	5	(Philippines)	Ronnie Magsanoc	5 ft 9 in (1.75 m)			UP Diliman
G	6	(Philippines)	Ato Agustin	5 ft 11 in (1.80 m)			Lyceum
F/C	7	(Philippines)	Richard del Rosario	6 ft 5 in (1.96 m)			De La Salle
F/C	9	(Philippines)	Jun Limpot	6 ft 5 in (1.96 m)			La Salle
F/C	10	(Philippines)	Aramis Calpito	6 ft 5 in (1.96 m)			San Sebastian
G/F	11	(Philippines)	Gerard Francisco	6 ft 3 in (1.91 m)			UST
F	15	(Philippines)	Expedito Falcasantos	6 ft 4 in (1.93 m)			Cebu
F/C	16	(Philippines)	Dennis Espino	6 ft 6 in (1.98 m)			UST
G	17	(Philippines)	Michael Orquillas	6 ft 2 in (1.88 m)			Cebu
F	23	(United States)	Rob Parker	6 ft 6 in (1.98 m)			Hawaii Pacific University

Coaches
Head coach
- (Philippines) Adonis Tierra
Assistant(s)
- (Philippines) Ricky Cui
- (Philippines) Joshua Villapando

Legend
- (DP) Unsigned draft pick
- (FA) Free agent
- (S) Suspended
- Injured

== Transactions ==
=== Additions ===
Player	Signed	Former team
Ato Agustin	Off-season	Pampanga Dragons (MBA)
Michael Orquillas	Off-season	Ginebra
Eugene Quilban		Davao Eagles (MBA)

=== Recruited imports ===
Tournament	Name	Number	Position	University/College
Commissioner's Cup; Governors' Cup	Kwan Johnson	3	Forward	University of New Orleans
Governors' Cup	Joseph Temple	24	Guard/forward	University of San Diego
