= 1999 PBA Governors' Cup finals =

Basketball championship

1999 PBA Governors Cup finals
Team	Coach	Wins
San Miguel Beermen	Jong Uichico	4
Alaska Milkmen	Tim Cone	2
- Dates: November 28, 1999- December 12, 1999
- MVP: Danny Seigle, Danny Ildefonso (co-finals MVPs)
- Television: VTV (IBC)
- Radio network: DZRV

PBA Governors Cup finals chronology
- < 1998 2000 >

PBA finals chronology
- < 1999 Commissioner's 2000 All-Filipino >

The 1999 PBA Governors Cup finals was the best-of-7 basketball championship series of the 1999 PBA Governors Cup, and the conclusion of the conference playoffs. The Alaska Milkmen and San Miguel Beermen played for the 74th championship contested by the league as the two successful ballclubs with rich tradition in winning titles battled for the last PBA championship of the 1990s era.

The San Miguel Beermen captured their second straight title of the season with a 4–2 series victory over Alaska Milkmen. The Beermen won their 13th PBA crown and are now the winningest ballclub, tied with the famed Crispa Redmanizers for most titles.

Danny Ildefonso and Danny Seigle shared won on his co-finals MVP in Governors Cup finals.

== Qualification ==
San Miguel		Alaska
Finished 6–2 (.750), 2nd	Eliminations	Finished 5–3 (.625), 3rd
defeated 6th seed Sta. Lucia	Quarterfinals	defeated 5th seed Shell
defeated Tanduay, 3–0	Best-of-5 semifinals	defeated Purefoods, 3–0

== Series scoring summary ==
Team	Game 1	Game 2	Game 3	Game 4	Game 5	Game 6	Wins
San Miguel	87	62	82	76	74	72	4
Alaska	80	73	88	65	68	69	2

== Games summary ==
=== Game 1 ===
VTV

November 28

San Miguel Beermen 87, Alaska Milkmen 80 (2OT)
San Miguel leads series, 1–0

Philsports Arena, Pasig

Johnny Abarrientos scored a basket with 1.5 seconds remaining forcing overtime at 68-all, in the extension, San Miguel again looked headed for an outright victory after posting a 76–73 lead with 3.3 seconds left. But Danny Ildefonso was slapped with a technical for second motion against Sean Chambers. Abarrientos drilled in the technical free throw, then nailed a jumper over Olsen Racela and the outstretched arms of Lamont Strothers to knot the count at 76-all, and send the game to a second overtime.

=== Game 2 ===
VTV

December 1

San Miguel Beermen 62, Alaska Milkmen 73
Series tied, 1–1

Centennial Arena, Laoag City

=== Game 3 ===
VTV

December 3

San Miguel Beermen 82, Alaska Milkmen 88
Alaska leads series, 2–1

Philsports Arena, Pasig

San Miguel took a 55–37 halftime lead and led 82–71, with less than 6 minutes left in the final quarter. Johnny Abarrientos set the tone for Alaska's comeback with a three-point shot to kick off a 17–0 windup by the Milkmen and held the Beermen scoreless to win the game.

=== Game 4 ===
VTV

December 5

San Miguel Beermen 76, Alaska Milkmen 65
Series tied, 2–2

Philsports Arena, Pasig

Lamont Strothers came through with big baskets down the stretch, Strothers' three-point play off rookie Don Allado with 3:32 remaining in the game cool off Alaska's comeback.

=== Game 5 ===
VTV

December 10

San Miguel Beermen 74, Alaska Milkmen 68
San Miguel leads series, 3–2

Philsports Arena, Pasig

=== Game 6 ===
VTV

December 12

San Miguel Beermen 72, Alaska Milkmen 69
San Miguel wins series, 4–2

Araneta Coliseum, Quezon City

Alaska led 54–53 going into the final quarter, a four straight points by Freddie Abuda, first on a follow-up shot on Strothers' miss and then on a backdoor play gave San Miguel a 59–56 edge, both teams had a scoring drought for three and a half minutes until Danny Seigle converted on a three-point play to give the Beermen a six-point cushion, 62–56, back-to-back baskets by Jojo Lastimosa and Kenneth Duremdes trim down the Beermen lead to two, 62–60, time down to 4:51, Danny Seigle has taken over the Beermen' scoring as the game went down to the final two minutes, with the score at 68–66 for San Miguel, Seigle losses the ball resulting to Duremdes converting a basket plus a foul with 1:25 left, Duremdes missed his bonus free throw and the game was tied at 68-all, Seigle was fouled by Duremdes with 1:14 to go and hit his two free throws to give San Miguel a 70–68 lead, a series of errors first with Alaska's Chambers losing the ball and Duremdes called for traveling violation and then Seigle on the next play was called for an advantage foul on Chambers after the ball was strip in his hands, Chambers split his free throw with 38.3 seconds remaining and Alaska got the ball possession after Chambers missed his second free throw, on an inbound play with 26.9 seconds left, Duremdes forces his shot and missed, Seigle was fouled with 7.7 seconds remaining by Duremdes, who was called for his sixth personal foul, Seigle converted on his two free throws to give San Miguel a 72–69 lead, on the final play in the last 5.6 seconds, Johnny Abarrientos eluded his defenders and had an open look from the three-point line but missed as the buzzer sounded, giving San Miguel the victory. Danny Ildefonso and Danny Seigle won on his shared co-Finals MVP and San Miguel capture on his 13th championship title.

1999 PBA Governors Cup Champions

San Miguel Beermen
13th title

== Rosters ==
San Miguel Beermen roster
Players

Pos.	#	POB	Name	Height	Weight	DOB (YYYY–MM–DD)	From
G	1	(Philippines)	Boybits Victoria	5 ft 11 in (1.80 m)	172 lb (78 kg)		San Beda
F	3	(United States)	Nic Belasco	6 ft 6 in (1.98 m)	210 lb (95 kg)		Notre Dame (OH)
C	5	(Philippines)	Ronilo Padilla	6 ft 6 in (1.98 m)	215 lb (98 kg)		Cebu
G/F	6	(United States)	Lamont Strothers (I)	6 ft 3 in (1.91 m)	190 lb (86 kg)		Christopher Newport
G	7	(Philippines)	Michael Mustre	6 ft 0 in (1.83 m)	180 lb (82 kg)		Letran
C	10	(Philippines)	Danny Ildefonso	6 ft 6 in (1.98 m)	210 lb (95 kg)		National-U
G/F	15	(Philippines)	Dwight Lago	6 ft 2 in (1.88 m)	190 lb (86 kg)		De La Salle
G	17	(Philippines)	Olsen Racela	5 ft 10 in (1.78 m)	165 lb (75 kg)		Ateneo
G	18	(Philippines)	Art Dela Cruz	6 ft 3 in (1.91 m)	210 lb (95 kg)		San Sebastian
C	24	(Philippines)	Cris Bolado	6 ft 7 in (2.01 m)	260 lb (118 kg)		National-U
F	25	(Philippines)	Freddie Abuda	6 ft 4 in (1.93 m)	200 lb (91 kg)		Cebu
G	32	(United States)	Rob Duat	6 ft 3 in (1.91 m)	200 lb (91 kg)		Menlo
F	42	(United States)	Danny Seigle	6 ft 6 in (1.98 m)	205 lb (93 kg)		Wagner

Coaches
Head coach
- (Philippines) Jong Uichico
Assistant(s)
- (Philippines) Jojo Villa

Legend
- (DP) Unsigned draft pick
- (FA) Free agent
- (S) Suspended
- (I) Import
- Injured

Alaska Milkmen roster
Players

Pos.	#	POB	Name	Height	Weight	DOB (YYYY–MM–DD)	From
F	4	(Philippines)	Braulio Lim	6 ft 3 in (1.91 m)	210 lb (95 kg)		UE
G	5	(Philippines)	Gilbert Reyes	5 ft 8 in (1.73 m)	160 lb (73 kg)		Ateneo
G/F	6	(Philippines)	Jojo Lastimosa	6 ft 1 in (1.85 m)	180 lb (82 kg)		USJ–R
G	7	(Philippines)	Roehl Gomez	6 ft 0 in (1.83 m)	180 lb (82 kg)		Cebu
F/C	8	(Philippines)	Don Allado	6 ft 6 in (1.98 m)	220 lb (100 kg)		De La Salle
G/F	9	(Philippines)	Rodney Santos	6 ft 2 in (1.88 m)	175 lb (79 kg)		San Sebastian
F/C	12	(Philippines)	Dickie Bachmann	6 ft 5 in (1.96 m)	200 lb (91 kg)		De La Salle
G	14	(Philippines)	Johnny Abarrientos	5 ft 8 in (1.73 m)	150 lb (68 kg)		Far Eastern
F	16	(Philippines)	Bong Hawkins	6 ft 3 in (1.91 m)	220 lb (100 kg)		UPHSD
C	17	(Philippines)	Kevin Ramas	6 ft 4 in (1.93 m)	240 lb (109 kg)		Mapúa
F	19	(Philippines)	Kenneth Duremdes	6 ft 3 in (1.91 m)	192 lb (87 kg)		Adamson
F	20	(United States)	Sean Chambers (I)	6 ft 1 in (1.85 m)	195 lb (88 kg)		Cal Poly
C	22	(United States)	James Walkvist	6 ft 10 in (2.08 m)	255 lb (116 kg)
C	32	(Philippines)	Poch Juinio	6 ft 5 in (1.96 m)	215 lb (98 kg)		Philippines

Coaches
Head coach
- (United States) Tim Cone
Assistant(s)
- (Philippines) Gilbert Reyes
- (Philippines) Richard Bachmann

Legend
- (DP) Unsigned draft pick
- (FA) Free agent
- (S) Suspended
- (I) Import
- Injured

== Broadcast notes ==
Game	Play-by-play	Analyst	Courtside Reporters
Game 1			
Game 2	Chino Trinidad	Yeng Guiao	
Game 3			
Game 4			
Game 5			
Game 6	Ed Picson	Andy Jao	Ronnie Nathanielsz, Jannelle So, Chiqui Roa-Puno and Dong Alejar
