= Andy Seigle =

Filipino-American basketball player

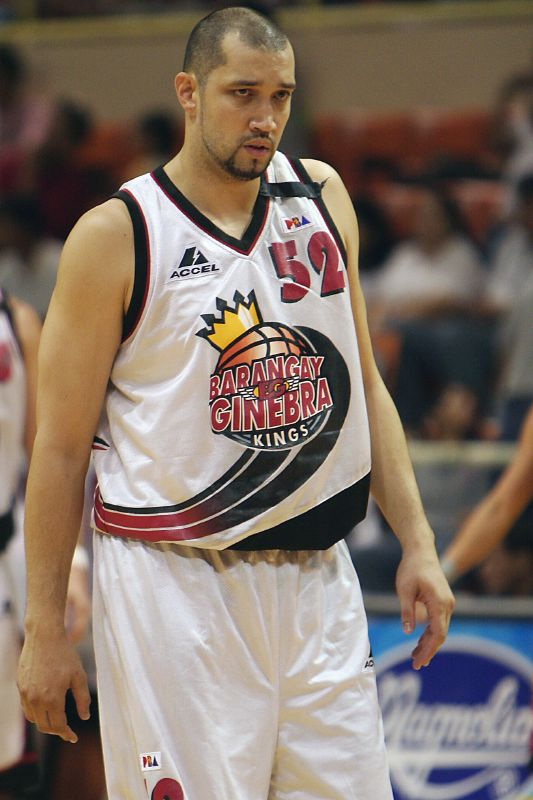
- Seigle in 2007

Personal information
- Born: May 15, 1972 (age 54) Scranton, Pennsylvania
- Listed height: 6 ft 9 in (2.06 m)
- Listed weight: 235 lb (107 kg)

Career information
- High school: Carbondale (Carbondale, Pennsylvania)
- College: New Orleans (1994–1996)
- PBA draft: 1997: 1st round1st overall
- Drafted by: Mobiline Phone Pals
- Playing career: 1997–2007
- Position: Center / power forward
- Number: 52

Career history
- 1997–1999: Mobiline Phone Pals
- 1999–2003: Purefoods Tender Juicy Hotdogs
- 2004–2007: Barangay Ginebra Kings

Career highlights
- 4x PBA champion (2002 Governors, 2004 Fiesta, 2004–05 Philippine, 2006–07 Philippine); PBA Rookie of the Year (1997); PBA All-Star (1999)
Medals
Men's basketball
Representing Philippines
Asian Games
| Bronze medal – third place | 1998 Bangkok | Team |
William Jones Cup
| Gold medal – first place | 1998 Taipei | Team |

Andrew John Yadao Seigle (born May 15, 1972) is a Filipino-American retired professional basketball player in the Philippine Basketball Association (PBA). He was also a member of the Philippine national basketball team. He is the brother of Danny Seigle, also a former basketball player in the same league.

== High school and college career ==
In high school, Seigle led Carbondale to a Final Four in the state of Pennsylvania. He then spent his junior and senior years playing for the New Orleans Privateers as a reserve.

== Professional career ==
=== Mobiline Phone Pals ===
In the 1997 PBA Draft, at the age of 24 years old, Seigle was drafted #1 overall by the Mobiline Phone Pals. He was the first #1 overall pick be Filipino-American and the first to come from a non-Philippine school.

Seigle was considered one of the most dominant and best defensive players early in his PBA career. In his first three games, he scored no less than 20 points, a feat that wouldn't be matched by another rookie until Bobby Ray Parks Jr. did it in 2019. He would go on to win Rookie of the Year.

=== Purefoods Tender Juicy Hotdogs ===
In 1999, Seigle was traded to the Purefoods Tender Juicy Hotdogs for Jerry Codiñera.

In 2001, he had his best scoring season with an average of 14.6 points.

From 2002 to 2003, Seigle couldn't play for the team as the Philippine Senate questioned his heritage.

=== Barangay Ginebra Kings ===
In 2004, Seigle joined the Barangay Ginebra Kings.

Seigle only got a one-year extension from the Ginebra management and with the arrival of Rafi Reavis and Billy Mamaril, his minutes suffered. He spent most of his time in his last season on the sidelines rather than on the court as he played only 30 games and just 8.9 minutes of playing time per outing, due to ACL injuries in both knees. As a result, the 6-9 center posted career-low averages of 2.6 points and 2.2 rebounds. He retired in 2007 after winning his last championship in the PBA.

== Career statistics ==
Legend
| GP | Games played | MPG | Minutes per game |
| FG% | Field-goal percentage | 3P% | 3-point field-goal percentage | FT% | Free-throw percentage |
| RPG | Rebounds per game | APG | Assists per game | SPG | Steals per game |
| BPG | Blocks per game | PPG | Points per game | **Bold** | Career high |

=== PBA season-by-season averages ===
| Year | Team | GP | MPG | FG% | 3P% | FT% | RPG | APG | SPG | BPG | PPG |
|---|---|---|---|---|---|---|---|---|---|---|---|
| 1997 | Mobiline | 45 | 35.4 | **.501** | .000 | .667 | **9.9** | 2.3 | **.5** | 1.7 | 13.5 |
| 1998 | Mobiline | 23 | **40.6** | .423 | .000 | .598 | 9.8 | **2.6** | .4 | **1.8** | 13.7 |
| 1999 | Mobiline | 41 | 31.5 | .469 | .000 | .635 | 7.4 | 1.0 | .3 | 1.4 | 9.7 |
| 1999 | Purefoods | 41 | 31.5 | .469 | .000 | .635 | 7.4 | 1.0 | .3 | 1.4 | 9.7 |
| 2000 | Purefoods | 51 | 29.3 | .457 | .000 | .625 | 7.4 | 1.2 | **.5** | 1.1 | 12.3 |
| 2001 | Purefoods | 21 | 32.4 | .421 | .000 | .622 | 8.0 | 1.9 | .2 | .8 | **14.6** |
| 2002 | Purefoods | 8 | 24.4 | .415 | .000 | .758 | 8.9 | 1.5 | .4 | 1.1 | 12.9 |
| 2003 | Purefoods | 31 | 22.6 | .455 | — | .731 | 7.2 | 1.1 | **.5** | 1.1 | 9.1 |
| 2004–05 | Barangay Ginebra | **68** | 16.8 | .461 | — | .629 | 5.0 | 1.1 | .3 | .6 | 6.5 |
| 2005–06 | Barangay Ginebra | 14 | 11.3 | .368 | — | .633 | 4.1 | .2 | .1 | .3 | 4.4 |
| 2006–07 | Barangay Ginebra | 30 | 8.9 | .444 | — | **.882** | 2.4 | .3 | .1 | .2 | 2.6 |
| Career | | 332 | 25.5 | .455 | .000 | .649 | 6.9 | 1.3 | .3 | 1.0 | 9.7 |

=== College ===
| Year | School | GP | MPG | FG% | 3P% | FT% | RPG | APG | SPG | BPG | PPG |
|---|---|---|---|---|---|---|---|---|---|---|---|
| 1994–95 | New Orleans | 28 | 9.5 | .430 | .000 | .741 | 2.2 | 0.2 | 0.2 | 0.5 | 4.4 |
| 1995–96 | New Orleans | 30 | 11.4 | .553 | .000 | .515 | 1.8 | 0.2 | 0.3 | 0.7 | 3.4 |
| Career | | 58 | 10.5 | .485 | .000 | .659 | 2.0 | 0.2 | 0.2 | 0.6 | 3.9 |

== Philippine National Team ==
Seigle has played twice for the Philippine national basketball team. The first was in 1998 when he played for the Philippine Centennial Team in the 1998 Asian Games held in Bangkok, Thailand where he averaged 7.1 points and 2.5 rebounds per game. The second was in 2002 when he again played for the national team during the 2002 Asian Games held in Busan, South Korea.

== Personal life ==
Andy is the brother of Danny Seigle, also a former basketball player in the same league. Their mother, Blesylda Yadao, is of Chinese Filipino descent while his father is a White American. In 2002, his heritage was questioned by the Philippine Senate as they held hearings on alleged Fil-foreign PBA players.

Seigle was previously married to a Filipina, but they separated. They had one child together.

Seigle has a passion for vehicles, and even owned a custom-made jeepney which he would drive to practices. As of 2020, he is living in Hawaii and owns a trucking business.
