= 1999 Alaska Milkmen season =

- Head coach: Tim Cone
- General Manager: Joaqui Trillo
- Owner(s): Wilfred Steven Uytengsu

All-Filipino Cup results
- Record: 11–12 (47.8%)
- Place: 2nd seed
- Playoff finish: Semis (lost to Tanduay)

Commissioner's Cup results
- Record: 10–5 (66.7%)
- Place: 1st seed
- Playoff finish: Semis (lost to SMB)

Governors Cup results
- Record: 11–7 (61.1%)
- Place: 4th seed
- Playoff finish: Runner-up (lost to SMB)

Alaska Milkmen seasons

The 1999 Alaska Milkmen season was the 14th season of the franchise in the Philippine Basketball Association (PBA).

== Draft pick ==
Round	Pick	Player	Nationality	College
1	8	Don Carlos Allado	Philippines	La Salle Manila

=== Direct hire ===
Player	Nationality	College
James Walkvist	United States	

== Summary ==
Alaska lost their first three games of the season but came back strongly and had an even four wins and four loss record after the first round of eliminations. The Milkmen were tied with Tanduay and Shell with nine wins and seven losses after 16 games and seeded second. Alaska were forced into a playoff by Purefoods but nonetheless prevailed over the Hotdogs in their do-or-die game to move into the best-of-five semifinal series against the Tanduay Rhum Masters. The Milkmen were beaten in four games and dethrone as champions by the returning PBA ballclub that had a strong frontline composed of powerhouse rookies Eric Menk and Sonny Alvarado.

Last year's best import Devin Davis will be playing his first full conference. The defending Commissioner's Cup champions raced on top of the standings with six wins and two losses and had no trouble making it to the next round. Alaska played their last season's championship rival San Miguel Beermen in the best-of-five semifinals. The Milkmen led the series, two games to one, but the Beermen bounces back by winning the last two games to enter in the finals series against Formula Shell as the Milkmen were booted out of the finals picture for the third straight conference.

Sean Chambers is playing in his 11th season in the league. Alaska won their last game in the Governors Cup eliminations against Shell to finish at the fourth spot and a twice-to-beat advantage in the quarterfinals. They repeated over the Shell Turbo Chargers to enter in the semifinal series against top-seeded Purefoods Tender Juicy Hotdogs. The Milkmen were able to retain their streak of a finals stint for the sixth straight season by scoring an easy 3-0 sweep over the Hotdogs as they once again battled their old rival San Miguel Beermen in the finals. Alaska lost in the Governors Cup finals in six games to the Beermen, which swept the last three games for a 4-2 series victory.

== Notable dates ==
March 7: Johnny Abarrientos torch the nets for 22 of his 35 points in the second half in carrying the undermanned Alaska five on his back for a classic 88-87 come-from-behind win over Tanduay Gold Rhum as the Milkmen continued their win streak to three games after a 0-3 start.

March 19: Alaska welcomes the return of all-star forward Bong Hawkins and scored a masterful 88-79 victory over San Miguel and tied the Beermen's won-loss record at 4-4.

March 24: Alaska pulled off an amazing 85-83 squeaker over Purefoods courtesy of Kenneth Duremdes' buzzer-beating 15-foot jumper.

== Roster ==
1999 Alaska Milkmen roster
Players

Pos.	#	POB	Name	Height	Weight	DOB (YYYY–MM–DD)	From
F	4	(Philippines)	Braulio Lim	6 ft 3 in (1.91 m)	210 lb (95 kg)		UE
G	5	(Philippines)	Gilbert Reyes	5 ft 8 in (1.73 m)	160 lb (73 kg)		Ateneo
G/F	6	(Philippines)	Jojo Lastimosa	6 ft 1 in (1.85 m)	180 lb (82 kg)		USJ–R
G	7	(Philippines)	Roehl Gomez	6 ft 0 in (1.83 m)	180 lb (82 kg)		Cebu
F/C	8	(Philippines)	Don Allado (*)	6 ft 6 in (1.98 m)	220 lb (100 kg)		De La Salle
G/F	9	(Philippines)	Rodney Santos	6 ft 2 in (1.88 m)	175 lb (79 kg)		San Sebastian
F/C	12	(Philippines)	Dickie Bachmann	6 ft 5 in (1.96 m)	200 lb (91 kg)		De La Salle
G	14	(Philippines)	Johnny Abarrientos	5 ft 8 in (1.73 m)	150 lb (68 kg)		Far Eastern
F	16	(Philippines)	Bong Hawkins	6 ft 3 in (1.91 m)	220 lb (100 kg)		UPHSD
C	17	(Philippines)	Kevin Ramas	6 ft 4 in (1.93 m)	240 lb (109 kg)		Mapúa
F	19	(Philippines)	Kenneth Duremdes	6 ft 3 in (1.91 m)	192 lb (87 kg)		Adamson
C	22	(United States)	James Walkvist	6 ft 10 in (2.08 m)	255 lb (116 kg)
C	32	(Philippines)	Poch Juinio	6 ft 5 in (1.96 m)	215 lb (98 kg)		Philippines
G	41	(Philippines)	Joey Loyzaga	6 ft 2 in (1.88 m)			San Beda
F/C	91	(Philippines)	Joey Valdez	6 ft 4 in (1.93 m)			Adamson

Coaches
Head coach
- (United States) Tim Cone
Assistant(s)
- (Philippines) Gilbert Reyes
- (Philippines) Richard Bachmann

Legend
- (DP) Unsigned draft pick
- (FA) Free agent
- (S) Suspended
- (*) Started playing in the Governors' Cup
- Injured

== Transactions ==
=== Recruited imports ===
Tournament	Name	Number	Position	University/College
Commissioner's Cup	Devin Davis	42	Center	Miami University
Governors' Cup	Sean Chambers	20	Forward	Cal Poly San Luis Obispo
