= Larry Robinson (basketball, born 1968) =

American basketball player (born 1968)

Personal information
- Born: January 11, 1968 (age 58) Bossier City, Louisiana, U.S.
- Listed height: 6 ft 3 in (1.91 m)
- Listed weight: 180 lb (82 kg)

Career information
- High school: Airline (Bossier City, Louisiana)
- College: Eastern Oklahoma State (1986–1988); Centenary (1988–1990)
- NBA draft: 1990: undrafted
- Playing career: 1990–2004
- Position: Small forward / shooting guard
- Number: 3, 2, 4, 5, 20, 6, 25

Career history
- 1990: Washington Bullets
- 1991: Golden State Warriors
- 1991: Washington Bullets
- 1991: Boston Celtics
- 1991–1992: Rapid City Thrillers
- 1992: Levallois
- 1992–1993: Rapid City Thrillers
- 1993: Washington Bullets
- 1993: Rapid City Thrillers
- 1993–1994: Yakima Sun Kings
- 1994: Houston Rockets
- 1994–1995: Yakima Sun Kings
- 1995–1996: CB Girona
- 1996–1997: Florida Beachdogs
- 1997: San Miguel Beermen
- 1997–1998: Rockford Lightning
- 1998: Vancouver Grizzlies
- 1998–1999: Rockford Lightning
- 1999: Panteras de Miranda
- 1999: San Miguel Beermen
- 1999–2000: Richmond Rhythm
- 2000–2001: Atlanta Hawks
- 2001: Cleveland Cavaliers
- 2001: Atlanta Hawks
- 2001–2002: New York Knicks
- 2002: Vaqueros de Bayamón
- 2004: Adirondack Wildcats

Career highlights
- NBA champion (1994); 2× PBA Champion (1999 Commissioner's, 1999 Governors'); Catalan League Champion (1996); CBA champion (1995); TAAC Player of the Year (1990); First-team All-TAAC (1990); Second-team All-TAAC (1989)
- Stats at NBA.com
- Stats at Basketball Reference

Larry Robinson (born January 11, 1968) is an American former professional basketball player who played parts of seven seasons in the National Basketball Association (NBA), among other leagues worldwide.

== Basketball career ==
Born in Bossier City, Louisiana, he played collegiately for two seasons (1986 to 1988) at Eastern Oklahoma State College and then two seasons (1988 to 1990) at the Centenary College of Louisiana.

He later played professionally with eight different NBA teams (Washington Bullets, Golden State Warriors, Boston Celtics, Houston Rockets, Vancouver Grizzlies, Atlanta Hawks, Cleveland Cavaliers, and New York Knicks) intermittently from 1990–01 to 2001–02. He also played in CBA, IBL, USBL, and abroad in France, Spain, the Philippines, Venezuela, and Puerto Rico.

Having played 89 games in parts of seven seasons, Robinson has an NBA record for fewest games played by players with at least six years of NBA experience.

== Personal ==
Robinson transferred to Centenary, which is the same alma mater as that of his cousin Robert Parish.

As of September 2010, Robinson worked for Horseshoe Casino and Hotel in Bossier City, Louisiana as Director of Player Development.

== Career statistics ==
Legend
GP	Games played	GS	Games started	MPG	Minutes per game
FG%	Field goal percentage	3P%	3-point field goal percentage	FT%	Free throw percentage
RPG	Rebounds per game	APG	Assists per game	SPG	Steals per game
BPG	Blocks per game	PPG	Points per game	**Bold**	Career high
†	Won an NBA championship

=== NBA ===
==== Regular season ====
Year	Team	GP	GS	MPG	FG%	3P%	FT%	RPG	APG	SPG	BPG	PPG
1990–91	Golden State	24	0	7.1	.407	–	.533	1.0	.5	.4	.0	2.3
1990–91	Washington	12	**10**	**21.3**	.418	.000	.583	2.3	**2.0**	.6	.0	**6.9**
1991–92	Boston	1	0	6.0	.200	–	–	2.0	1.0	.0	.0	2.0
1992–93	Washington	4	0	8.3	.375	.000	.600	.8	.8	.3	**.3**	3.8
1993–94†	Houston	6	0	9.2	**.500**	.250	.375	1.7	1.0	**1.2**	.0	4.2
1997–98	Vancouver	6	0	6.8	.316	**.500**	**1.000**	2.0	.2	.7	.0	2.8
2000–01	Cleveland	1	0	1.0	–	–	–	.0	.0	.0	.0	.0
2000–01	Atlanta	**33**	1	19.1	.364	.379	.875	**2.6**	1.1	.8	.1	6.0
2001–02	New York	2	0	5.0	.250	**.500**	–	1.0	.0	.0	.0	1.5
Career		89	11	13.5	.384	.373	.667	1.9	.9	.6	.0	4.5
