= 1999 Tanduay Rhum Masters season =

- Head coach: Alfrancis Chua
- General Manager: David de Joya
- Owner(s): Lucio "Bong" Tan Jr.

All-Filipino Cup results
- Record: 15–12 (55.6%)
- Place: 3rd seed
- Playoff finish: Runner-up (Shell 2-4)

Commissioner's Cup results
- Record: 5–4 (55.6%)
- Place: 5th seed
- Playoff finish: QF (lost to SMB)

Governor's Cup results
- Record: 9–5 (64.3%)
- Place: 2nd seed
- Playoff finish: Semis (lost to SMB)

Tanduay Rhum Masters seasons

The 1999 Tanduay Gold Rhum Masters season was the 1st season of the new franchise in the Philippine Basketball Association (PBA).

== Draft pick ==
Round	Pick	Player	Nationality	College
1	1	Sonny Alvarado	Puerto Rico	Texas-Austin

== League return ==
A multi-titled ballclub in the Philippine Basketball League (PBL), having won several championships since it resurfaced in 1995, the Tanduay Gold Rhum Masters, now owned by Tanduay Distillers, Inc., makes a grand return to the PBA after a 12-year absence.

Tanduay was allowed to elevate six players from their farm team in the Philippine Basketball League (PBL), these are Eric Menk, Mark Telan, Chris Cantonjos, Jomer Rubi, Alvin Magpantay and Derrick Bughao. The Rhum Masters also added Bobby Jose, a PBA returnee who played for Tanduay in the PBL for the past two seasons. The team will be handled by their winning PBL coach Alfrancis Chua. Two more players from their farm team, Rene Alforque and Jorge Gallent soon join them in the pro ranks.

== Occurrences ==
On March 8, The living legend of Philippine Basketball, Senator Robert Jaworski on his 53rd birthday, formally joined the Tanduay ballclub as Team Consultant and Chief Endorser/Spokesman of their liquor product in a press conference held at the Century Park Hotel, there were speculations that Jaworski might appear in one game for Tanduay and play one last time in the PBA.

Nigerian import Ime Uduok played one game in the Commissioner's Cup before being replaced by Ira Clark.

== Finals stint ==
Seeded third after 16 games in the eliminations of the All-Filipino Cup and tied with Alaska and Shell with nine wins and seven losses. The Rhum Masters advances in the best-of-five semifinal series by eliminating Pop Cola and went on to play the defending champions Alaska Milkmen. The Rhum Masters took a commanding 2–0 lead and while the Milkmen bounced back with a victory in Game three, the Rhum Masters finish them off in Game four as rookie Sonny Alvarado poured in 32 points in a 111–93 victory that sent Tanduay to the All-Filipino Cup finals in their maiden appearance.

Going up against Formula Shell in the championship series, the Rhum Masters tied the series at two games apiece before losing the last two games to settled for runner-up finish.

== Notable dates ==
February 24: Rookie Sonny Alvarado registered a conference-high early with 46 points in Tanduay's 94–78 victory over Sta.Lucia Realtors in Bustos, Bulacan.

February 28: Tanduay Gold Rhum continued its spirited run in the All-Filipino Cup with a 95–85 victory over Purefoods for its third straight win after losing their first two games of the season.

March 12: Pido Jarencio tallied a game-high 36 points and spewed fire from long range as Tanduay routs Shell Zoom Masters, 100–79.

July 14: Tanduay clobbered Pop Cola, 78–66, despite the presence of Noli Locsin with his new team as the Rhum Masters remain unbeaten with its third straight victory in the Commissioner's Cup and tied San Miguel and Alaska on top with three wins without a loss.

July 21: The Rhum Masters held on to score their fifth straight win and retain solo leadership when it topple Alaska, 70–68. Eric Menk pulled off a crucial steal on Kenneth Duremdes and two more defensive gems by Tanduay stalled Alaska's tries to tie the match.

== Roster ==
Tanduay Rhum Masters roster
Players

Pos.	#	POB	Name	Height	Weight	DOB (YYYY–MM–DD)	From
G	1	(Philippines)	Jason Webb	6 ft 2 in (1.88 m)			De La Salle
G	2	(Philippines)	Jorge Gallent	6 ft 2 in (1.88 m)			Far Eastern
G	7	(Philippines)	Jomer Rubi	5 ft 7 in (1.70 m)			UPHSD
F	11	(Philippines)	Bobby Jose	6 ft 3 in (1.91 m)			UST
F	12	(Philippines)	Alvin Magpantay	6 ft 3 in (1.91 m)			De La Salle
F/C	13	(Philippines)	Mark Telan	6 ft 6 in (1.98 m)			De La Salle
F/C	15	(Puerto Rico)	Sonny Alvarado	6 ft 7 in (2.01 m)			Texas-Austin
G	16	(Philippines)	Derick Bughao	5 ft 8 in (1.73 m)			Visayas
G	18	(Philippines)	Rene Alforque	5 ft 10 in (1.78 m)			Cebu
G/F	22	(Philippines)	Jayvee Gayoso	6 ft 2 in (1.88 m)			Ateneo
G	25	(Philippines)	Pido Jarencio	5 ft 10 in (1.78 m)			UST
C	30	(United States)	Eric Menk	6 ft 6 in (1.98 m)			Lake Superior State
F/C	33	(Philippines)	Chris Cantonjos	6 ft 6 in (1.98 m)			UST

Coaches
Head coach
- (Philippines) Alfrancis Chua
Assistant(s)
- (Philippines) Angelito Esguerra
- (Philippines) Lawrence Chongson

Legend
- (DP) Unsigned draft pick
- (FA) Free agent
- (S) Suspended
- Injured

^{Team Manager: David de Joya}

== Transactions ==
=== Additions ===
Player	Signed	Former team
Jaime Gayoso	Off-season	Ginebra
Pido Jarencio	Off-season	Ginebra
Jason Webb	Off-season	Sta. Lucia Realtors

=== Recruited imports ===
Tournament	Name	Number	Position	Nationality	University/College
Commissioner's Cup	Ime Oduok	53	Center-Forward	Nigeria	Loyola Marymount University
Commissioner's Cup	Joe Ira Clark	24	Forward-Center	United States	University of Texas
Governors' Cup	Ronnie Fields	20	Guard	United States	Farragut Academy
