= Richard Yee =

Filipino basketball player

Personal information
- Born: June 29, 1977 (age 49) San Jose de Buenavista, Antique, Philippines
- Listed height: 6 ft 5 in (1.96 m)
- Listed weight: 205 lb (93 kg)

Career information
- College: UST
- PBA draft: 1999: 1st round, 5th overall pick
- Drafted by: Purefoods Tender Juicy Hotdogs
- Playing career: 1999–2011
- Position: Power forward/center

Career history
- 1999–2009: Purefoods Tender Juicy Giants
- 2009–2010: Air21 Express
- 2010–2011: Barako Bull Energy Boosters

Richard Yee is a Filipino former professional basketball player who played in the Philippine Basketball Association (PBA).

== PBA career statistics ==
Legend
GP	Games played	MPG	Minutes per game
FG%	Field-goal percentage	3P%	3-point field-goal percentage	FT%	Free-throw percentage
RPG	Rebounds per game	APG	Assists per game	SPG	Steals per game
BPG	Blocks per game	PPG	Points per game	**Bold**	Career high

=== Season-by-season averages ===
Year	Team	GP	MPG	FG%	3P%	FT%	RPG	APG	SPG	BPG	PPG
1999	Purefoods	37	14.6	.488	—	.333	2.8	.5	.2	**.4**	3.7
2000	Purefoods	48	11.6	.494	—	.579	2.3	.5	.4	.1	2.0
2001	Purefoods	44	21.9	**.574**	—	.556	3.5	1.0	**.6**	.3	6.1
2002	Purefoods	24	11.2	.447	.000	.375	1.8	.9	.4	.1	3.0
2003	Purefoods	10	15.1	.407	—	**.818**	3.6	.9	.4	.1	3.1
2004–05	Purefoods	**64**	19.2	.478	—	.573	4.3	1.2	.3	.3	5.7
2005–06	Purefoods	53	15.6	.486	—	.632	3.8	.5	.3	.1	4.9
2006–07	Purefoods	39	**23.0**	.484	.000	.500	5.0	.5	.3	.1	6.3
2007–08	Purefoods	35	8.9	.510	—	.632	1.8	.4	.1	.0	2.1
2009–10	Burger King / Air21	31	19.4	.189	.000	.533	**5.1**	**1.6**	.3	.1	**6.6**
2010–11	Barako Bull	12	13.3	.478	.000	.591	4.0	.5	.0	**.4**	4.8
Career		397	16.4	.422	.000	.556	3.5	.8	.3	.2	4.6
