= 1999 Barangay Ginebra Kings season =

- Head coach: Rino Salazar; Allan Caidic (Governors' Cup)
- General manager: Casiano Cabalan, Jr
- Owners: La Tondeña Distillers, Inc.

All-Filipino Cup results
- Record: 10–13 (43.5%)
- Place: 8th seed
- Playoff finish: Semis (lost to Shell)

Commissioner's Cup results
- Record: 4–6 (40%)
- Place: 6th seed
- Playoff finish: QF (lost to Sta.Lucia)

Governors Cup results
- Record: 1–8 (11.1%)
- Place: 8th seed
- Playoff finish: QF (lost to Purefoods)

Barangay Ginebra Kings seasons

The 1999 Barangay Ginebra Kings season was the 21st season of the franchise in the Philippine Basketball Association (PBA).

== Draft pick ==
Round	Pick	Player	Nationality	College
1	9	Danilo Aying	Philippines	SWU

== New Era ==
In December 1998, Robert Jaworski, Sr. announced his resignation from the Ginebra ballclub during a press conference, bidding goodbye to the team and the sport that made him an icon. As the PBA entered its 25th season, a New Era had come for the "never-say-die" team now known as Barangay Ginebra Kings.

Also, San Miguel Corporation assigned Casiano "Jun" Cabalan, Jr. as their new general manager, replacing their long time executive Bernabe Navarro.

== Occurrences ==
Allan Caidic, who was assigned as player-assistant coach of Ginebra at the start of the season, began his role as playing-coach for the team starting the Governors Cup, replacing coach Rino Salazar. The Kings has yet to score a victory in five games when they decided to replace import Mario Donaldson in favor of Monty Lamont Wilson.

== Notable dates ==
March 12: The Gin Kings stopped Alaska's winning run with a 97–87 victory and maintain their winning streak to three after losing their first four games in the season.

May 5: Barangay Ginebra defeated Sta.Lucia Realtors, 77–74, in their playoff game for the 8th and last entry to the quarterfinal round.

May 12: Point guard Bal David converted a buzzer-beating shot from an inbound with three seconds left as Barangay Ginebra Kings pulled a stunning 82–81 upset win over top-seeded Mobiline Phone Pals in the do-or-die quarterfinals match. The Kings with a twice-to-beat disadvantage, forces a playoff three nights ago and repeated over the heavily favored Phone Pals. Barangay Ginebra will go up against Formula Shell in the best-of-five semifinal series of the All-Filipino Cup.

November 7: Barangay Ginebra defeated Pop Cola, 80–76, in a battle of winless teams to end a seven-game slump and give Allan Caidic his first win as playing-coach.

== Roster ==
1999 Barangay Ginebra Kings roster
Players

Pos.	#	POB	Name	Height	Weight	DOB (YYYY–MM–DD)	From
G	1	(Philippines)	Bal David	5 ft 9 in (1.75 m)			UST
F	2	(Philippines)	Vergel Meneses	6 ft 2 in (1.88 m)			José Rizal
G/F	3	(Philippines)	Elmer Lago	6 ft 2 in (1.88 m)			De La Salle
G	4	(Philippines)	Merwin Castelo	6 ft 2 in (1.88 m)			San Beda
F	8	(Philippines)	Allan Caidic	6 ft 2 in (1.88 m)			UE
F/C	12	(Philippines)	Yves Dignadice	6 ft 4 in (1.93 m)			USLS
C	13	(Philippines)	Marlou Aquino	6 ft 9 in (2.06 m)			Adamson
G	15	(Philippines)	Edward Naron	6 ft 1 in (1.85 m)			Visayas
F	16	(Philippines)	Benny Cheng	6 ft 3 in (1.91 m)			Mapúa
C	18	(Philippines)	Wilmer Ong	6 ft 4 in (1.93 m)			USLS
F	19	(Philippines)	Danilo Aying	6 ft 1 in (1.85 m)			Southwestern-U
F	33	(Philippines)	Teodoro Valera	6 ft 2 in (1.88 m)			UST
C	34	(Philippines)	Jolly Escobar	6 ft 5 in (1.96 m)			UE

Coaches

Head coach

- (Philippines) Allan Caidic

Assistant coach(es)

- (Philippines) Cris Calilan

Team manager

- (Philippines) Casiano Cabalan, Jr

Legend

- (C) Team captain
- Injured

== Transactions ==
=== Off-season trades ===
December 1998	To San Miguel Beermen Cris Bolado	To Barangay Ginebra Allan Caidic, Edward Naron
January 1999	To Tanduay Rhum Masters Pido Jarencio	To Barangay Ginebra Jolly Escobar ^{Acquired by Tanduay from Shell}
January 1999	To San Miguel Beermen Anastacio Mendoza ^{2nd overall pick from Ginebra}	To Barangay Ginebra Merwin Castelo

=== Additions ===
Player	Signed	Former team
Elmer Lago	Off-season	Purefoods
Teodoro Valera	Off-season	N/A
Yves Dignadice	October 1999	San Miguel Beermen

=== Mid-season trade ===
July 10, 1999	To Pop Cola Noli Locsin	To Barangay Ginebra Vergel Meneses

=== Recruited imports ===
Tournament	Name	Number	Position	University/College
Commissioner's Cup	Chris King	17	Forward	Wake Forest University
Governors' Cup	Mario Donaldson	25	Guard/forward	Drake University
Governors' Cup	Monty Wilson	44	Guard/forward	Tennessee State University
