= Sonny Alvarado =

Puerto Rican basketball player

Personal information
- Born: January 15, 1973 (age 53)
- Listed height: 6 ft 7 in (2.01 m)
- Listed weight: 225 lb (102 kg)

Career information
- College: Long Beach State (1991–1992); New Mexico JC (1992–1993); Gavilan (1993–1994); Texas at Austin (1994–1996)
- PBA draft: 1999: 1st round, 1st overall pick
- Drafted by: Tanduay Rhum Masters
- Playing career: 1996–2000
- Position: Center / power forward

Career history
- 1998–1999: Explosivos de Moca
- 1999–2000: Tanduay Rhum Masters

Career highlights
- PBA All-Star (1999); PBA Mythical First Team (1999); PBA Scoring Champion (1999)

Earl Sonny Alvarado (born January 15, 1973) is a Puerto Rican former basketball player who played in the Philippine Basketball Association for the Tanduay Rhum Masters. He was known as "The Punisher".

== Player profile ==
Alvarado played for multiple colleges in NCAA, and ended up at University of Texas at Austin. He played for Spain, Mexico, China, Japan, Taiwan, and Puerto Rico pro ballclubs.

Alvarado was drafted by Tanduay Rhum Masters as first overall. In his first year, he led the team to a Finals finish lost to Benjie Paras-led Formula Shell. In his time with Tanduay, he was a front-court tandem with Eric Menk.

== Controversy ==
In the middle of the 2000 PBA All-Filipino Cup semifinals against Purefoods, Alvarado found without any evidence or document that he has a Filipino citizenship. He was deported by the Department of Justice Bureau of Immigration. The sweep of the team against Purefoods were later voided, and Purefoods eventually marched to the Finals.

== PBA career statistics ==
Legend
GP	Games played	MPG	Minutes per game
FG%	Field-goal percentage	3P%	3-point field-goal percentage	FT%	Free-throw percentage
RPG	Rebounds per game	APG	Assists per game	SPG	Steals per game
BPG	Blocks per game	PPG	Points per game	**Bold**	Career high

=== Season-by-season averages ===
Year	Team	GP	MPG	FG%	3P%	FT%	RPG	APG	SPG	BPG	PPG
1999	Tanduay Gold	48	**43.8**	.450	.213	.689	13.1	**3.9**	2.2	1.0	22.9
2000	Tanduay	17	39.5	**.451**	**.338**	**.722**	**13.4**	3.5	2.2	**1.2**	**24.1**
Career		65	41.6	.451	.276	.706	13.3	3.7	2.5	1.1	23.2
