= Lamont Strothers =

American basketball player (born 1968)

Personal information
- Born: May 10, 1968 (age 58) Nansemond County, Virginia, U.S.
- Listed height: 6 ft 5 in (1.96 m)
- Listed weight: 191 lb (87 kg)

Career information
- High school: Forest Glen (Suffolk, Virginia)
- College: Christopher Newport (1987–1991)
- NBA draft: 1991: 2nd round, 43rd overall pick
- Drafted by: Golden State Warriors
- Playing career: 1991–2002
- Position: Shooting guard
- Number: 6,7,10, 12, 42

Career history
- 1991–1992: Portland Trail Blazers
- 1992: Iraklis Thessaloniki
- 1992: Yakima Sun Kings
- 1993: Dallas Mavericks
- 1993: Yakima Sun Kings
- 1993: Rochester Renegade
- 1993: Quad City Thunder
- 1993–1994: Tri-City Chinook
- 1994: Rockford Lightning
- 1994: Fajardo Cariduros
- 1994–1995: Maccabi Ramat Gan
- 1995: Fajardo Cariduros
- 1995: Maccabi Jerusalem
- 1995–1996: CRO Lyon
- 1996: Darüşşafaka
- 1996: Capitanes de Arecibo
- 1996–1997: Darüşşafaka
- 1996–1997: San Miguel Beermen
- 1997: Capitanes de Arecibo
- 1997–1998: Darüşşafaka
- 1998–1999: San Miguel Beermen
- 1999: Cáceres CB
- 1999: Capitanes de Arecibo
- 1999–2002: San Miguel Beermen

Career highlights
- 2× PBA champion (1999 Governors', 2000 Governors'); PBA Best Import (1999 Governor's Cup); 2× Turkish League Top Scorer (1996, 1997)
- Stats at NBA.com
- Stats at Basketball Reference

William Lamont Strothers (born May 10, 1968) is an American former professional basketball player. Born in Nansemond County, Virginia Strothers played college basketball for Christopher Newport. He was selected in the 1991 NBA draft and had short stints in the NBA with the Portland Trail Blazers and the Dallas Mavericks. He played in CBA, but he spent most of his professional career overseas. After retiring from professional basketball, he took coaching positions in high school basketball teams.

== Biography ==
Born in Nansemond County, Virginia, Strothers' parents Calvin and Brenda separated when he was three years old. His mother was later remarried to a supportive military man when he was five. His brother, Calvin Jr., played football and basketball at New Hampshire. Later he joined the military where he was selected to play on their elite basketball team as a power forward. In 2023, he earned a B.S. in Business Management from Hampton University.

== Amateur career ==
Strothers was a shooter for the Forest Glen high school varsity in Suffolk, Virginia. As a senior in 1986, his vision was impaired after being struck in the left eye by brass knuckles in a fistfight. After a year, Strothers was barred from signing up for the military because of his impaired vision. He then worked at a meatpacking plant and played in recreational leagues. Strothers turned down a partial scholarship offer from Georgia because of difficulty paying half the tuition. While playing in a recreational league, Strothers was offered a spot on the team at Christopher Newport University by assistant basketball coach Roland Ross. Strothers played four years at Christopher Newport University from 1987 to 1991, scoring 2,709 points for an average of 23.3 points per game. For leading his team to a 21–4 record en route to the Dixie Conference championship, he was named first-team All-American and Division III Player of the Year by Basketball Times in 1991. Strothers finished his collegiate career as the third-all-time-leading scorer in Division III history.

== Professional career ==
In the 1991 NBA draft, the Golden State Warriors drafted him in the 2nd round—43rd overall—making him the highest-ever draft pick for an NCAA Division III player. He was subsequently traded to the Portland Trail Blazers. He spent parts of two seasons with Portland and the Dallas Mavericks, amassing an NBA career average of 4.6 points per game in a total of 13 games.

Strothers played most of his career overseas and enjoyed success in the Philippines as an import for the San Miguel Beermen from 1996 to 2002. He was voted Best Import in the 1999 PBA Governors Cup and led the team to a championship. He also led his sixth-seeded team to the 2000 Governor's Cup title. Strothers finished his PBA career with over 3,900 points.

== Coaching career ==
Strothers, in 2006–07, was the head coach of a 15–8 team at Bethel High School, Virginia. In 2010, he was part of the USA South Conference's inaugural Hall of Fame class. Strothers was part of the CNU Captains' run to the Final Four as an assistant to Carolyn Hunter during the 2010–11 season. In August 2011, he was hired as head boys' varsity basketball coach at Warwick High School in Newport News, Virginia. Replacing longtime coach Ben Moore in 2011–12, his team went 1–20 overall and 0–18 in the Peninsula District in his first season. The next year, his Raiders were 8–15, 5–13. In March 2013, Strothers announced he was leaving Warwick.

In 2015, Strothers was coach of the Nansemond-Suffolk Academy boys' basketball team.

In 2017, Strothers was named coach of the Smithfield High School boys' basketball team.

In 2018, after the death of coach Benjamin Moore, who was a close family friend and father-like figure, Strothers took over the basketball program at Menchville High School.
