= Danny Seigle =

Filipino-American basketball player

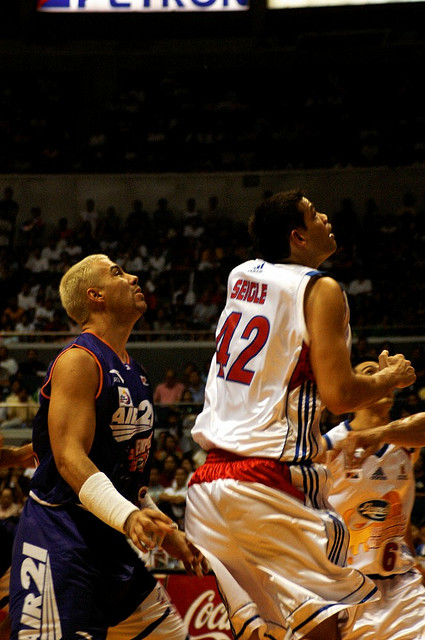
- Seigle in 2007

Personal information
- Born: June 14, 1976 (age 50) Scranton, Pennsylvania
- Listed height: 6 ft 6 in (1.98 m)
- Listed weight: 205 lb (93 kg)

Career information
- High school: Carbondale (Carbondale, Pennsylvania)
- College: Wagner (1994–1998)
- PBA draft: 1999: Direct Hire
- Drafted by: San Miguel Beermen
- Playing career: 1999–2017
- Position: Power forward
- Coaching career: 2017–2019

Career history

Playing
- 1999–2011: San Miguel Beermen / Magnolia Beverage Masters
- 2011–2013: Air21 Express / Barako Bull Energy
- 2013–2017: Talk 'N Text Tropang Texters / TNT Tropang Texters / Tropang TNT / TNT KaTropa

Coaching
- 2017–2019: San Miguel Alab Pilipinas (team consultant)
- 2019: De La Salle

Career highlights
- As player: 8× PBA champion (1999 Commissioner's, 1999 Governors', 2000 Commissioner's 2000 Governors', 2001 All-Filipino, 2005 Fiesta, 2009 Fiesta, 2015 Commissioner's); 4× PBA Finals MVP (1999 Commissioner's, 1999 Governors', 2000 Governors', 2001 All-Filipino); 2× PBA Best Player of the Conference (1999 Governors', 2006 Philippine); 8× PBA All-Star (1999–2001, 2004–2007, 2011); 3× PBA Mythical First Team (1999–2001); PBA Mythical Second Team (2006); PBA Rookie of the Year (1999); PBA Comeback Player of the Year (2006); 50 Greatest Players in PBA History (2025 selection); Brunei Cup Most Valuable Player (2006); As consultant: ABL champion (2018)

Daniel Charles Yadao Seigle (born June 14, 1976) is a Filipino-American basketball coach and former professional basketball player. He is the former head of basketball operations of the De La Salle Green Archers men's basketball team and a team consultant for the San Miguel Alab Pilipinas of the ASEAN Basketball League. He last played for the TNT KaTropa of the Philippine Basketball Association (PBA). He won the 1999 PBA Rookie of the Year and led San Miguel to six championships (out of a total of eight) during his career. He is also a two-time member of the Philippine national basketball team.

== Amateur career ==
Seigle starred for his high school basketball team, Carbondale Area Chargers leading them to winning 59 consecutive games and a state title. He then joined the Wagner Seahawks after being recruited by coach Tim Capstraw. Seigle became a two-time Northeast Conference first-team selection for the Seahawks. Closing his college career with scoring 20-plus points in nine of his final ten games, he finished sixth in Wagner's all-time scoring list, with 1,652 total points scored, and also in the top ten all-time for field goals, 3-pointers and free throws.

== PBA career ==
=== San Miguel Beermen (1999–2011) ===
==== Early years ====
In 1999, San Miguel acquired Seigle as its direct hire Filipino-foreign cager, after the league instituted a rule for every team to have one Filipino-foreign cager acquired without going through the process of joining the rookie draft. Danny has an older brother named Andy, who was then still playing for the Mobiline Phone Pals by the time Danny himself was acquired by the Beermen. Their mother, Blesylda Yadao, is a Filipina while his father is American.

Despite a huge showing in the 1999 All-Filipino Conference, the Beermen were eliminated by eventual champion Formula Shell. However, the Beermen won the 1999 Commissioner's Cup and the Governor's Cup, with Seigle, 1998 Rookie of the Year Danny Ildefonso, Olsen Racela and imports Terquin Mott (Commissioner's Cup) and Lamont Strothers (Governor's Cup) leading the charge. At season's end, Seigle won the Rookie of the Year honors. In 2000, Seigle continued to spark big numbers for San Miguel and led the team in regaining the Commissioner's and Governor's Cup titles. He set the league record winning 4 Finals MVP awards.

==== Injuries ====
In his fourth season with the league, Seigle joined the RP National Training Pool, as preparation for the 2002 Asian Games in Busan, South Korea. Although he did sit a few games for guest RP teams Hapee and Selecta during the Governor's and Commissioner's Cup, Seigle managed to play in a number of exhibition games against foreign clubs. However, during a pre-Asian Games match against Qatar on September 22, 2002, Seigle suffered a torn right Achilles tendon after taking a shot.

Due to the extent of the injury, Seigle missed the entire 2003 season. While there were hints of a possible return during the season, the team kept him on the injured list. He made his much-awaited return to the team in the 2004 Fiesta Conference, albeit in a much limited role. It was the first time Seigle played for San Miguel since 2001. However, Seigle's old form resurfaced in the 2004-05 Philippine Cup, leading San Miguel to a third-place finish. In the 2005 Fiesta Conference, Danny helped the Beermen win their 17th title.

==== Return to form ====
The Philippine Cup put Seigle in the headlines as he scored at least 20+ points in 19 straight times during the conference breaking Alvin Patrimonio's previous record. It also helped San Miguel gain an outright semifinals berth while earning him the Best Player of the Conference Award, his second since 1999.

=== Air21 Express/Barako Bull (2011–2013) ===
In the 2010–2011 season, after playing many successful years for San Miguel Beermen, Seigle was traded to the Air21 Express along with Paul Artadi, Dorian Peña and Dondon Hontiveros. Seigle has declined an offer from Barako Bull for a contract extension as he expressed his desire to explore other options, less than two weeks before the start of the PBA's 39th season.

=== Talk 'N Text Tropang Texters ===
During the 2013–14 Philippine Cup, Seigle was signed by the Talk 'N Text Tropang Texters. He made his debut on December 3, 2013 with a total of 13 points and 8 rebounds. On January 19, 2014, he made a career high of 21 points as a Talk 'N Text player against Brgy. Ginebra San Miguel and closed their elimination with a lopsided win. He also became the 31st local player to reach 8,000 career points in the PBA. He won his 8th and last championship with the Tropang Texters after they defeated the Rain or Shine Elasto Painters in seven games during the 2015 Commissioner's Cup. He played for four seasons with the Katropa.

== Coaching career ==
=== San Miguel Alab Pilipinas ===
After the 2017 season of the PBA, Seigle was hired as an team consultant for the San Miguel Alab Pilipinas alongside head coach Jimmy Alapag.

=== De La Salle ===
In May 2019, he became the Head Coach of De La Salle Green Archers.

== Personal life ==
Seigle lives in Makati and has business interests in Manila and in the US.

== Awards ==
=== Professional basketball career ===
- 1999 PBA Rookie of the Year
- 1999 PBA Finals Most Valuable Player (Commissioner's Cup)
- 1999 PBA Mythical First Team
- 1999 PBA Best Player of the Conference
- 1999 PBA Finals Most Valuable Player (Governor's Cup)
- 2000 PBA Finals Most Valuable Player (Governor's Cup)
- 2000 PBA Mythical First Team
- 2000 PBA Most Points
- 2000 PBA Most Freethrows Made
- 2000 PBA Most 2-Pointers Made
- 2001 PBA Finals Most Valuable Player (All-Filipino Cup)
- 2001 PBA Mythical First Team
- 2001 PBA Most Points
- 2001 PBA Most Freethrows Made
- 2005-2006 PBA Best Player of the Conference
- 2005-2006 PBA Comeback Player of the Year
- 2005-2006 PBA Mythical Second Team
- 2005-2006 PBA Most Freethrows Made
- 2006 Brunei Sultan Cup Most Valuable Player
- First Player to score 20+ in 19 straight games (League Record)
- Voted 9 times as PBA All Star
- PBA Top 10 Most Free Throws Made
- 31st PBA Player to reach 8,000 points (January 19, 2014)
- 49th PBA Player to reach 300 blocks on 02/12/17
- 2-time Philippine National Team Member (2002, 2007)
- 4-time PBA Finals Most Valuable Player (League Record)
- 3-time PBA Mythical First Team, 1-time PBA Mythical Second Team
- 2-time PBA Best Player of the Conference
- 14 PBA Finals Appearances
- 18 PBA Seasons
- 8-time PBA Champion
- Wagner College Athletics Hall of Fame, Member (Induction Class 2014)

=== High school ===
- USA Today High School Honorable Mention All-American
- Pennsylvania High School All-State Player twice
- Scranton Times-Tribune Regional Player of the Year as a High School Senior

=== College ===
- 1994-1995 Northeast Conference All Newcomer Team
- 1995-1996 Northeast Conference All Conference Second Team
- 1996-1997 Northeast Conference All Conference First Team
- 1997-1998 Northeast Conference All Conference First Team
- Wagner College Athletics Hall of Fame, Member (Induction Class 2014)

== National team career ==
Seigle was selected to be a member of the 2002 and 2007 Philippine National Team.

In 2006, in preparation for the Tokushima Games, he played for the National team leading them to their second straight Brunei Cup title. Seigle was also named as the tournament's Most Valuable Player.

== Wagner Hall of Fame ==
On October 4, 2014, Seigle was inducted into the Wagner College Athletics Hall of Fame.

== Career statistics ==
Legend
GP	Games played	MPG	Minutes per game
FG%	Field-goal percentage	3P%	3-point field-goal percentage	FT%	Free-throw percentage
RPG	Rebounds per game	APG	Assists per game	SPG	Steals per game
BPG	Blocks per game	PPG	Points per game	**Bold**	Career high

=== PBA season-by-season averages ===
Year	Team	GP	MPG	FG%	3P%	FT%	RPG	APG	SPG	BPG	PPG
1999	San Miguel	55	**40.7**	.311	.290	.780	7.2	2.0	.7	.7	19.2
2000	San Miguel	51	39.3	.322	.288	.734	6.0	**2.8**	.6	.5	20.1
2001	San Miguel	56	37.2	.402	**.356**	.778	6.1	2.6	.6	.5	18.8
2004–05	San Miguel	**59**	31.1	.434	.315	.781	5.6	2.2	.6	.5	17.3
2005–06	San Miguel	44	32.6	.449	.127	.769	7.8	2.4	.6	.8	20.1
2006–07	San Miguel	28	30.4	.456	.333	.797	**8.0**	2.0	.6	.5	**22.2**
2007–08	Magnolia	38	25.3	.429	.343	.784	6.4	1.2	.3	.5	15.4
2008–09	San Miguel	15	23.4	.426	.286	**.851**	5.3	1.7	.2	.8	13.4
2009–10	San Miguel	29	15.3	.371	.258	.759	3.5	.9	.1	.4	6.9
2010–11	San Miguel	40	24.0	.428	.268	.756	5.7	1.3	.4	**.9**	12.1
2010–11	Air21	40	24.0	.428	.268	.756	5.7	1.3	.4	**.9**	12.1
2011–12	Barako Bull	31	22.5	.461	.314	.722	4.9	1.3	**.9**	.6	12.8
2012–13	Barako Bull	31	21.2	.437	.300	.724	4.6	1.3	.3	.4	11.8
2013–14	Talk 'N Text	28	15.5	.436	.308	.760	4.3	.8	.4	.4	8.3
2014–15	Talk 'N Text	28	10.3	.441	.250	.717	2.5	.6	.1	.2	5.0
2015–16	TNT	15	13.8	.444	.000	.614	3.3	1.0	.5	.7	6.6
2017–18	TNT	18	5.2	**.515**	.000	.000	1.0	.2	.1	.3	1.9
Career		566	27.4	.401	.302	.765	5.5	1.7	.5	.5	14.8

=== College ===
Year	Team	GP	MPG	FG%	3P%	FT%	RPG	APG	SPG	BPG	PTS
1994–95	Wagner	27	25.6	.425	.222	.595	4.4	1.0	0.7	0.9	8.6
1995–96	Wagner	27	31.5	.410	.370	.764	5.0	1.1	0.9	0.6	14.9
1996–97	Wagner	26	34.3	.422	.390	.780	6.2	1.5	0.8	0.6	17.5
1997–98	Wagner	29	31.8	.406	.393	.663	5.7	1.3	1.1	0.5	19.3
Career		109	30.8	.414	.365	.706	5.3	1.2	0.9	0.7	15.2
