= Terquin Mott =

American basketball player (born 1974)

Personal information
- Born: January 30, 1974 (age 52) Philadelphia, Pennsylvania, U.S.
- Listed height: 6 ft 8 in (2.03 m)
- Listed weight: 245 lb (111 kg)

Career information
- High school: Glen Mills (Glen Mills, Pennsylvania)
- College: La Salle (1992–1994); Coppin State (1995–1997)
- NBA draft: 1997: undrafted
- Playing career: 1997–2003
- Position: Power forward / center

Career history
- 1997: Philadelphia Power
- 1997–1998: La Crosse Bobcats
- 1998: Ortakoy Spor
- 1998: Camden Power
- 1998: TDK Manresa
- 1999: Rockford Lightning
- 1999: La Crosse Bobcats
- 1999: San Miguel Beermen
- 1999–2000: Gijón Baloncesto
- 2000: Galatasaray
- 2001: Lucentum Alicante
- 2001: Fayetteville Patriots
- 2001–2002: Grand Rapids Hoops
- 2001–2002: Gary Steelheads
- 2002–2003: Cantabria Lobos

Career highlights
- 2× All-CBA Second Team (1999, 2002); PBA Best Import (1999); MEAC Player of the Year (1996)

Terquin T. Mott (born January 30, 1974) is a former basketball player who played in the Continental Basketball Association, in Europe, Asia and South America. He played college basketball at La Salle University and Coppin State University and was the 1996 Mid-Eastern Athletic Conference Player of the Year.

In his first game with TDK Manresa, he scored 20 points in an 83–65 victory over Girona.

Mott played in the Continental Basketball Association (CBA) and earned selections to the All-CBA Second Team in 1999 and 2002.
