= 1999 PBA All-Filipino Cup =

Basketball tournament

- Duration: February 7 – June 6, 1999
- TV partner(s): VTV (IBC)

Finals
- Champions: Formula Shell Zoom Masters
- Runners-up: Tanduay Gold Rhum Masters

Awards
- Best Player: Eric Menk (Tanduay Gold Rhum Masters)
- Finals MVP: Gerald Esplana (Formula Shell Zoom Masters)

PBA All-Filipino Cup chronology
- < 1998 2000 >

PBA conference chronology
- < 1998 Governors' 1999 Commissioner's >

The 1999 PBA All-Filipino Cup or known as the 1999 McDonald's-PBA All-Filipino Cup for sponsorship reasons, was the First Conference of the 1999 PBA season. It started on February 7 and ended on June 6, 1999. The tournament is an All-Filipino format, which doesn't require an import or a pure-foreign player for each team.

== Format ==
The following format will be observed for the duration of the conference:

- Two-round eliminations; 16 games per team. 8 teams will advance to the Quarterfinals.
- Quarterfinals: top 4 seeded teams will have twice-to-beat advantage
  - QF1: 1st seed vs. 8th seed
  - QF2: 2nd seed vs. 7th seed
  - QF3: 3rd seed vs. 6th seed
  - QF4: 4th seed vs. 5th seed
- Best-of-five Semifinals: winners of each pairings
  - SF1: QF1 vs. QF4
  - SF2: QF2 vs. QF3
- Third-place match: One-game playoff
  - LSF1 vs. LSF2
- Finals: Best-of-7 championship series
  - F1: WSF1 vs. WSF2

== Elimination round ==
=== Team standings ===
| Pos | Team | W | L | PCT | GB | Qualification |
|---|---|---|---|---|---|---|
| 1 | Mobiline Phone Pals | 11 | 5 | .688 | — | Twice-to-beat in the quarterfinals |
| 2 | Alaska Milkmen | 9 | 7 | .563 (Note: Head-to-head differential: Alaska +11, Tanduay +8, Shell −19) | 2 | Twice-to-beat in the quarterfinals |
| 3 | Tanduay Gold Rhum Masters | 9 | 7 | .563 | 2 | Twice-to-beat in the quarterfinals |
| 4 | Formula Shell Zoom Masters | 9 | 7 | .563 | 2 | Twice-to-beat in the quarterfinals |
| 5 | San Miguel Beermen | 8 | 8 | .500 | 3 | Twice-to-win in the quarterfinals |
| 6 | Pop Cola 800s | 7 | 9 | .438 (Note: Head-to-head record: Pop Cola 2–0 Purefoods) | 4 | Twice-to-win in the quarterfinals |
| 7 | Purefoods TJ Hotdogs | 7 | 9 | .438 | 4 | Twice-to-win in the quarterfinals |
| 8 | Barangay Ginebra Kings | 6 | 10 | .375 (Note: Eighth-seed playoff: Barangay Ginebra 77–74 Sta. Lucia) | 5 | Twice-to-win in the quarterfinals |
| 9 | Sta. Lucia Realtors | 6 | 10 | .375 | 5 | |

Source: PBA.ph

== Eighth seed playoff ==
VTV

May 5

Barangay Ginebra Kings 77, Sta. Lucia Realtors 74

PhilSports Arena, Pasig

== Bracket ==
Quarterfinals (Top 4 twice-to-beat)
1 | Mobiline | 67 | 81
8 | Brgy. Ginebra | 81 | 82
4 | Formula Shell | 79
5 | San Miguel | 73
2 | Alaska | 74 | W
7 | Purefoods | 86 | L
3 | Tanduay | 91
6 | Pop Cola | 77

Semifinals (Best-of-5)
8 | Brgy. Ginebra | 0
4 | Formula Shell | 3
2 | Alaska | 1
3 | Tanduay | 3

Finals (Best-of-7)
4 | Formula Shell | 4
3 | Tanduay | 2
Third place playoff
8 | Brgy. Ginebra | 95
2 | Alaska | 73

== Quarterfinals ==
=== (1) Mobiline vs. (8) Barangay Ginebra ===
VTV

May 9

Mobiline Phone Pals 67, Barangay Ginebra Kings 77

PhilSports Arena, Pasig

VTV

May 12

Mobiline Phone Pals 81, Barangay Ginebra Kings 82
Barangay Ginebra wins series in two games

PhilSports Arena, Pasig

With a 7–0 start, Mobiline had a losing run to finish the elimination round. Being the #1 seed, they faced the ragtag Barangay Ginebra Kings with a twice to beat advantage.

The Kings managed to keep in step with the Phone Pals throughout the game; with Mobiline leading by one point in the closing seconds, Bal David converted a jump-shot as time expired that caused jubilation at the mostly pro-Ginebra crowd. Asi Taulava broke down and slumped to the bench right after David's game-clinching jumper and booked a flight to the United States the day after the game.

=== (2) Alaska vs. (7) Purefoods ===
VTV

May 7

Alaska Milkmen 74, Purefoods TJ Hotdogs 86

PhilSports Arena, Pasig

VTV

May 12

Alaska Milkmen W, Purefoods TJ Hotdogs L
Alaska wins series in two games

PhilSports Arena, Pasig

=== (3) Tanduay vs. (6) Pop Cola ===
VTV

May 7

Tanduay Rhum 91, Pop Cola 800s 77
Tanduay wins series in one game

PhilSports Arena, Pasig

=== (4) Shell vs. (5) San Miguel ===
VTV

May 9

Formula Shell Zoom Masters 79, San Miguel Beermen 73
Shell wins series in one game

PhilSports Arena, Pasig

== Semifinals ==
=== (2) Alaska vs. (3) Tanduay ===
VTV

May 14

Alaska Milkmen 84, Tanduay Rhum Masters 86

Araneta Coliseum, Quezon City

VTV

May 16

Alaska Milkmen 77, Tanduay Rhum Masters 98

PhilSports Arena, Pasig

VTV

May 19

Alaska Milkmen 103, Tanduay Rhum Masters 98

Bago Cultural Center, Bago, Negros Occidental

VTV

May 21

Alaska Milkmen 93, Tanduay Rhum Masters 111
Tanduay wins series, 3–1

PhilSports Arena, Pasig

=== (4) Shell vs. (8) Barangay Ginebra ===
VTV

May 14

Formula Shell Zoom Masters 81, Barangay Ginebra Kings 67

Araneta Coliseum, Quezon City

VTV

May 16

Formula Shell Zoom Masters 84, Barangay Ginebra Kings 63

PhilSports Arena, Pasig

VTV

May 19

Formula Shell Zoom Masters 98, Barangay Ginebra Kings 85
Formula Shell wins series, 3–0

Bago Cultural Center, Bago, Negros Occidental

Barangay Ginebra would come up short in their playoffs run as the Zoom Masters swept them in their semifinals series, 3–0. Game 2 had a free-for all bench-clearing brawl that saw punches being thrown; Shell player Jay Mendoza instigated the fight when he elbowed Ginebra's Wilmer Ong. A total of ₱235,000 worth of fines were issued by PBA commissioner Jun Bernardino, the second-greatest amount since the 1990 finals played, ironically, by Shell and Ginebra, where Ginebra walked out to hand Shell the championship trophy.

== Third place playoff ==
VTV

May 23

Alaska Milkmen 73, Barangay Ginebra Kings 95

PhilSports Arena, Pasig

== Finals ==
VTV

May 23

Tanduay Rhum Masters 91, Formula Shell Zoom Masters 84

PhilSports Arena, Pasig

VTV

May 26

Tanduay Rhum Masters 76, Formula Shell Zoom Masters 79

Araneta Coliseum, Quezon City

VTV

May 30

Tanduay Rhum Masters 81, Formula Shell Zoom Masters 91

Ormoc Superdome, Ormoc City

VTV

June 2

Tanduay Rhum Masters 87, Formula Shell Zoom Masters 65

PhilSports Arena, Pasig

VTV

June 4

Tanduay Rhum Masters 68, Formula Shell Zoom Masters 75

PhilSports Arena, Pasig

VTV

June 6

Tanduay Rhum Masters 76, Formula Shell Zoom Masters 85
Formula Shell wins series, 4–2

Araneta Coliseum, Quezon City
