= 1999 PBA draft =

Player selection in Philippine basketball

General information
- Date: January 16, 1999
- Location: Glorietta Activity Center, Makati
- Network: VTV on IBC

Overview
- League: Philippine Basketball Association
- First selection: Sonny Alvarado (Tanduay Rhum Masters)

The 1999 Philippine Basketball Association (PBA) rookie draft was an event at which teams drafted players from the amateur ranks. The draft was held on January 16, 1999 at Glorietta in Makati.

== Tanduay's concession ==
In 1999, Tanduay made its return to the PBA as the league's ninth member. As part of the agreement, the league allowed six players, four of which were rookies, from their PBL lineup to be elevated to the pro league.

Name	Position	School/club team	Country of origin
Eric Menk	F/C	Lake Superior State	United States
Mark Clemence Telan	F/C	De La Salle	Philippines
Christopher Cantonjos	F/C	Santo Tomas	Philippines
Jomer Rubi	PG	Perpetual Help	Philippines
Derrick Bughao	PG	Visayas	Philippines
Alvin Magpantay	F	La Salle-Letran	Philippines

== Direct hire ==
PBA team	Player	Country of origin*	College
Mobiline Phone Pals	Asi Taulava	Tonga	BYU-Hawaii
San Miguel Beermen	Danny Seigle	United States	Wagner
Sta. Lucia Realtors	Robert Parker	United States	Hawaii Pacific University
Pop Cola 800s	Jon Ordonio	United States	The Master's College
Purefoods Tender Juicy Hotdogs	Alvarado Segova	United States	University of Central Oklahoma

== Round 1 ==
Pick	Player	Country of origin*	PBA team	College
1	Earl Sonny Alvarado	Puerto Rico	Tanduay Rhum Masters	Texas-Austin
2	Anastacio Mendoza	Philippines	Barangay Ginebra Kings	Far Eastern
3	Erwin Luna	Philippines	Formula Shell	Adamson
4	Bryan Gahol	Philippines	Mobiline Phone Pals	UP Diliman
5	Richard Yee	Philippines	Purefoods Tender Juicy Hotdogs	Santo Tomas
6	Roel Buenaventura	Philippines	Pop Cola 800s	UE
7	Arnold Rodriguez	Philippines	Formula Shell	PUP
8	Don Carlos Allado	Philippines	Alaska Milkmen	De La Salle
9	Danilo Aying	Philippines	Barangay Ginebra Kings	Southwestern

== Round 2 ==
Pick	Player	Country of origin*	PBA team	College
10	Gerard Francisco	Philippines	Sta. Lucia Realtors	UST
11	Renato Alforque	Philippines	Mobiline Phone Pals	UV
12	Dennis Harrison	United States	Formula Shell	Hawaii
13	Ronald Saracho	Philippines	Purefoods Tender Juicy Hotdogs	Southwestern
14	Donbel Belano	Philippines	Pop Cola 800s	UV
15	Felix Flores, Jr	Philippines	Purefoods Tender Juicy Hotdogs	
16	Reynaldo Mendez	Philippines	Mobiline Phone Pals	UE
17	Renato Suba	Philippines	Tanduay Rhum Masters	PSBA
18	Christopher Abellana	Philippines	Sta. Lucia Realtors	UV

== Round 3 ==
Pick	Player	Country of origin*	PBA team	College
19	Marvin Isidro	United States	Barangay Ginebra Kings	Farrington High School
20	Teddy Agullana	United States	Pop Cola 800s	James B. Castle High School
21	Rommel Daep	Philippines	San Miguel Beermen	San Sebastian
22	Victor Pambuan	United States	San Miguel Beermen	Ohlone
