= 1999 PBA season =

25th PBA season

- Duration: February 7 – December 12, 1999
- Teams: 9
- TV partner: VTV (IBC)

1999 PBA Draft
- Top draft pick: Sonny Alvarado
- Picked by: Tanduay Rhum Masters
- Season MVP: Benjie Paras (Shell Velocity)
- All-Filipino Cup champions: Formula Shell Zoom Masters
- All-Filipino Cup runners-up: Tanduay Rhum Masters
- Commissioner's Cup champions: San Miguel Beermen
- Commissioner's Cup runners-up: Formula Shell Zoom Masters
- Governors Cup champions: San Miguel Beermen
- Governors Cup runners-up: Alaska Milkmen

Seasons
- ← 1998 2000 →

The 1999 PBA season was the 25th season of the Philippine Basketball Association (PBA).

== Season highlights ==
- A new era began with the entry of Fil-foreign cagers such as Asi Taulava, Danny Seigle and Eric Menk.
- During the opening ceremonies, the PBA honored basketball greats in their respective era as the all-time first five, nominated in each decade from 1950s–1990s were Caloy Loyzaga, Narciso Bernardo, Robert Jaworski, Hector Calma and Alvin Patrimonio, surprisingly absent from the list was Ramon Fernandez, who was then the MBA Commissioner.
- The opening ceremonies for the said season went head-to-head against the opening ceremonies of rival league, MBA, involving the TV network war. The PBA sought the alliance of GMA Network who facilitated their opening ceremonies while MBA used ABS-CBN's roster of stars for its opening ceremonies.
- The PBA transferred from the Cuneta Astrodome to the PhilSports Arena as their main playing venue.
- The league changes their playdates from Tuesdays, Fridays, and Sundays to Wednesdays, Fridays and Sundays. Friday games were still held exclusively at the Araneta Coliseum while the Sunday games are played at the PhilSports Arena.
- The Tanduay Rhum Masters returned to the PBA after a 12-year absence.
- During the off-season, the league allowed each team to have a direct-hire Filipino-Foreigner recruit as their answer to the increasing popularity of rival basketball league, the Metropolitan Basketball Association.
- Formula Shell became the 10th team to win the All-Filipino crown, and won their first back-to-back championships, the underdog Shell team led by Benjie Paras, Victor Pablo and Gerry Esplana, defied the odds by beating the stronger Tanduay ballclub, composed of powerhouse rookies Sonny Alvarado, Mark Telan, Chris Cantonjos and Eric Menk.
- The San Miguel Beermen, under new coach Jong Uichico, ended a five-year title-drought and won the final two conferences of the season to tie the legendary Crispa Redmanizers for the most championships with 13.

== Opening ceremonies ==
The muses for the participating teams are as follows:

| Team | Muse |
|---|---|
| Alaska Milkmen | |
| Barangay Ginebra Kings | Ruffa Gutierrez |
| Formula Shell Zoom Masters | Francine Prieto |
| Pop Cola 800s | Cris Villonco |
| Mobiline Phone Pals | |
| Purefoods Tender Juicy Hotdogs | |
| San Miguel Beermen | Aileen Damiles |
| Sta. Lucia Realtors | |
| Tanduay Rhum Masters | Ara Mina |

== 1999 PBA All-Filipino Cup ==
=== Elimination round ===
| Pos | Team | W | L | PCT | GB | Qualification |
|---|---|---|---|---|---|---|
| 1 | Mobiline Phone Pals | 11 | 5 | .688 | — | Twice-to-beat in the quarterfinals |
| 2 | Alaska Milkmen | 9 | 7 | .563 (Note: Head-to-head differential: Alaska +11, Tanduay +8, Shell −19) | 2 | Twice-to-beat in the quarterfinals |
| 3 | Tanduay Gold Rhum Masters | 9 | 7 | .563 | 2 | Twice-to-beat in the quarterfinals |
| 4 | Formula Shell Zoom Masters | 9 | 7 | .563 | 2 | Twice-to-beat in the quarterfinals |
| 5 | San Miguel Beermen | 8 | 8 | .500 | 3 | Twice-to-win in the quarterfinals |
| 6 | Pop Cola 800s | 7 | 9 | .438 (Note: Head-to-head record: Pop Cola 2–0 Purefoods) | 4 | Twice-to-win in the quarterfinals |
| 7 | Purefoods TJ Hotdogs | 7 | 9 | .438 | 4 | Twice-to-win in the quarterfinals |
| 8 | Barangay Ginebra Kings | 6 | 10 | .375 (Note: Eighth-seed playoff: Barangay Ginebra 77–74 Sta. Lucia) | 5 | Twice-to-win in the quarterfinals |
| 9 | Sta. Lucia Realtors | 6 | 10 | .375 | 5 | |

Source: PBA.ph

=== Playoffs ===
Quarterfinals (Top 4 twice-to-beat)
1 | Mobiline | 67 | 81
8 | Brgy. Ginebra | 81 | 82
4 | Formula Shell | 79
5 | San Miguel | 73
2 | Alaska | 74 | W
7 | Purefoods | 86 | L
3 | Tanduay | 91
6 | Pop Cola | 77

Semifinals (Best-of-5)
8 | Brgy. Ginebra | 0
4 | Formula Shell | 3
2 | Alaska | 1
3 | Tanduay | 3

Finals (Best-of-7)
4 | Formula Shell | 4
3 | Tanduay | 2
Third place playoff
8 | Brgy. Ginebra | 95
2 | Alaska | 73

==== Quarterfinals ====
| Team 1 | Series | Team 2 | Game 1 | Game 2 |
|---|---|---|---|---|
| (1) Mobiline Phone Pals* | 1–1 | (8) Barangay Ginebra Kings | 67–77 | 81–82 |
| (2) Alaska Milkmen* | 1–1 | (7) Purefoods TJ Hotdogs | 74–86 | W–L |
| (3) Tanduay Gold Rhum Masters* | 0–2 | (6) Pop Cola 800s | 91–77 | — |
| (4) Formula Shell Zoom Masters* | 1–0 | (5) San Miguel Beermen | 79–73 | — |

*Team has twice-to-beat advantage. Team 1 only has to win once, while Team 2 has to win twice.

==== Semifinals ====
| Team 1 | Series | Team 2 | Game 1 | Game 2 | Game 3 | Game 4 | Game 5 |
|---|---|---|---|---|---|---|---|
| (2) Alaska Milkmen | 1–3 | (3) Tanduay Gold Rhum Masters | 84–86 | 77–98 | 103–98 | 93–111 | — |
| (4) Formula Shell Zoom Masters | 3–0 | (8) Barangay Ginebra Kings | 81–67 | 84–63 | 98–85 | — | — |

==== Third place playoff ====
| Team 1 | Score | Team 2 |
|---|---|---|
| (2) Alaska Milkmen | 73–95 | (8) Barangay Ginebra Kings |

==== Finals ====
| Team 1 | Series | Team 2 | Game 1 | Game 2 | Game 3 | Game 4 | Game 5 | Game 6 | Game 7 |
|---|---|---|---|---|---|---|---|---|---|
| (3) Tanduay Rhum Masters | 4–2 | (4) Shell Turbo Chargers | 91–84 | 76–79 | 81–91 | 87–65 | 68–75 | 76–85 | — |

== 1999 PBA Commissioner's Cup ==
=== Elimination round ===
| Pos | Team | W | L | PCT | GB | Qualification |
|---|---|---|---|---|---|---|
| 1 | Alaska Milkmen | 6 | 2 | .750 | — | Twice-to-beat in the quarterfinals |
| 2 | Formula Shell Zoom Masters | 5 | 3 | .625 | 1 | Twice-to-beat in the quarterfinals |
| 3 | Sta. Lucia Realtors | 5 | 3 | .625 | 1 | Twice-to-beat in the quarterfinals |
| 4 | San Miguel Beermen | 5 | 3 | .625 | 1 | Twice-to-beat in the quarterfinals |
| 5 | Tanduay Rhum Masters | 5 | 3 | .625 | 1 | Twice-to-win in the quarterfinals |
| 6 | Barangay Ginebra Kings | 3 | 5 | .375 | 3 | Twice-to-win in the quarterfinals |
| 7 | Purefoods TJ Hotdogs | 3 | 5 | .375 | 3 | Twice-to-win in the quarterfinals |
| 8 | Mobiline Phone Pals | 3 | 5 | .375 | 3 | Twice-to-win in the quarterfinals |
| 9 | Pop Cola 800s | 1 | 7 | .125 | 5 | |

Source: PBA.ph

=== Playoffs ===
Quarterfinals (Top 4 twice-to-beat)
1 | Alaska | 88
8 | Mobiline | 77
4 | San Miguel | 73
5 | Tanduay | 67
2 | Formula Shell | 71 | 65
7 | Purefoods | 78 | 58
3 | Sta. Lucia | 96
6 | Barangay Ginebra | 75

Semifinals (Best-of-5)
1 | Alaska | 2
4 | San Miguel | 3
2 | Formula Shell | 3
3 | Sta. Lucia | 2

Finals (Best-of-7)
4 | San Miguel | 4
2 | Formula Shell | 2
Third place playoff
1 | Alaska | 93
3 | Sta. Lucia | 88

==== Quarterfinals ====
| Team 1 | Series | Team 2 | Game 1 | Game 2 |
|---|---|---|---|---|
| (1) Alaska Milkmen* | 1–0 | (8) Mobiline Phone Pals | 88–77 | — |
| (2) Formula Shell Zoom Masters* | 1–1 | (7) Purefoods TJ Hotdogs | 71–78 | 65–58 |
| (3) Sta. Lucia Realtors* | 1–0 | (6) Barangay Ginebra Kings | 96–75 | — |
| (4) San Miguel Beermen* | 1–0 | (5) Tanduay Rhum Masters | 73–67 | — |

*Team has twice-to-beat advantage. Team 1 only has to win once, while Team 2 has to win twice.

==== Semifinals ====
| Team 1 | Series | Team 2 | Game 1 | Game 2 | Game 3 | Game 4 | Game 5 |
|---|---|---|---|---|---|---|---|
| (1) Alaska Milkmen | 2–3 | (4) San Miguel Beermen | 79–68 | 78–86 | W–L | 69–75 | 73–84 |
| (2) Formula Shell Zoom Masters | 3–2 | (3) Sta. Lucia Realtors | 76–87 | 87–73 | 82–85 | 82–64 | 65–62 |

==== Third place playoff ====
| Team 1 | Score | Team 2 |
|---|---|---|
| (1) Alaska Milkmen | 93–88 | (3) Sta. Lucia Realtors |

==== Finals ====
| Team 1 | Series | Team 2 | Game 1 | Game 2 | Game 3 | Game 4 | Game 5 | Game 6 | Game 7 |
|---|---|---|---|---|---|---|---|---|---|
| (2) Formula Shell Zoom Masters | 2–4 | (4) San Miguel Beermen | 64–68 | 68–78 | 89–87 (OT) | 77–72 | 85–89 | 64–74 | — |

== 1999 PBA Governors' Cup ==
=== Elimination round ===
| Pos | Team | W | L | PCT | GB | Qualification |
|---|---|---|---|---|---|---|
| 1 | Purefoods TJ Hotdogs | 7 | 1 | .875 (Note: Head-to-head record: Purefoods 1–0 Tanduay) | — | Twice-to-beat in the quarterfinals |
| 2 | Tanduay Rhum Masters | 7 | 1 | .875 | — | Twice-to-beat in the quarterfinals |
| 3 | San Miguel Beermen | 6 | 2 | .750 | 1 | Twice-to-beat in the quarterfinals |
| 4 | Alaska Milkmen | 5 | 3 | .625 | 2 | Twice-to-beat in the quarterfinals |
| 5 | Shell Velocity | 4 | 4 | .500 | 3 | Twice-to-win in the quarterfinals |
| 6 | Sta. Lucia Realtors | 3 | 5 | .375 (Note: Head-to-head record: Sta. Lucia 1–0 Mobiline) | 4 | Twice-to-win in the quarterfinals |
| 7 | Mobiline Phone Pals | 3 | 5 | .375 | 4 | Twice-to-win in the quarterfinals |
| 8 | Barangay Ginebra Kings | 1 | 7 | .125 | 6 | Twice-to-win in the quarterfinals |
| 9 | Pop Cola 800s | 0 | 8 | .000 | 7 | |

Source: PBA.ph

=== Playoffs ===
Quarterfinals (Top 4 twice-to-beat)
#1 twice-to-beat
1 | Purefoods | 80
8 | Brgy. Ginebra | 74
#4 twice-to-beat
4 | Alaska | 77
5 | Shell Velocity | 65
#2 twice-to-beat
2 | Tanduay | 78 | 84
7 | Mobiline | 93 | 75
#3 twice-to-beat
3 | San Miguel | 82
6 | Sta.Lucia | 66

Semifinals (best-of-5)
1 | Purefoods | 0
4 | Alaska | 3
2 | Tanduay | 0
3 | San Miguel | 3

Finals (best-of-7)
4 | Alaska | 2
3 | San Miguel | 4
Third place playoff
1 | Purefoods | 92
2 | Tanduay | 101

==== Quarterfinals ====
| Team 1 | Series | Team 2 | Game 1 | Game 2 |
|---|---|---|---|---|
| (1) Purefoods TJ Hotdogs* | 1–0 | (8) Barangay Ginebra Kings | 80–74 | — |
| (2) Tanduay Rhum Masters* | 1–1 | (7) Mobiline Phone Pals | 78–93 | 84–75 |
| (3) San Miguel Beermen* | 1–0 | (6) Sta. Lucia Realtors | 82–68 | — |
| (4) Alaska Milkmen* | 1–0 | (5) Shell Velocity | 77–65 | — |

*Team has twice-to-beat advantage. Team 1 only has to win once, while Team 2 has to win twice.

==== Semifinals ====
| Team 1 | Series | Team 2 | Game 1 | Game 2 | Game 3 | Game 4 | Game 5 |
|---|---|---|---|---|---|---|---|
| (1) Purefoods TJ Hotdogs | 0–3 | (4) Alaska Milkmen | 91–92 | 80–86 | L–W | — | — |
| (2) Tanduay Rhum Masters | 0–3 | (3) San Miguel Beermen | 80–81 | 68–79 | 62–66 | — | — |

==== Third place playoff ====
| Team 1 | Score | Team 2 |
|---|---|---|
| (1) Purefoods TJ Hotdogs | 92–101 | (2) Tanduay Rhum Masters |

==== Finals ====
| Team 1 | Series | Team 2 | Game 1 | Game 2 | Game 3 | Game 4 | Game 5 | Game 6 | Game 7 |
|---|---|---|---|---|---|---|---|---|---|
| (3) San Miguel Beermen | 4–2 | (4) Alaska Aces | 87–80 (2OT) | 62–73 | 82–88 | 76–65 | 74–68 | 72–69 | — |

== Awards ==
- Most Valuable Player: Benjie Paras (Shell)
- Rookie of the Year: Danny Seigle (San Miguel)
- Sportsmanship Award: Rey Evangelista (Purefoods)
- Most Improved Player: Elmer Lago (Ginebra)
- Defensive Player of the Year: Chris Jackson (Formula Shell)
- Mythical Five
  - Johnny Abarrientos (Alaska)
  - Jeffrey Cariaso (Mobiline)
  - Sonny Alvarado (Tanduay)
  - Benjie Paras (Shell)
  - Danny Seigle (San Miguel)
- Mythical Second Team
  - Olsen Racela (San Miguel)
  - Danny Ildefonso (San Miguel)
  - Eric Menk (Tanduay)
  - Jojo Lastimosa (Alaska)
  - Kenneth Duremdes (Alaska)
- All Defensive Team
  - Chris Jackson (Shell)
  - Freddie Abuda (San Miguel)
  - Johnny Abarrientos (Alaska)
  - Dindo Pumaren (Purefoods)
  - Eric Menk (Tanduay)

=== Awards given by the PBA Press Corps ===
- Coach of the Year:Perry Ronquillo (Shell)
- Mr. Quality Minutes: Rodney Santos (Alaska)
- Executive of the Year: Jun Bernardino (PBA commissioner)
- Comeback Player of the Year: Benjie Paras (Shell)
- Referee of the Year: Ernie de Leon

== Cumulative standings ==
| Pos | Team | Pld | W | L | PCT | Best finish |
|---|---|---|---|---|---|---|
| 1 | San Miguel Beermen | 55 | 35 | 20 | .636 | Champions |
| 2 | Formula Shell Zoom Masters/Velocity | 56 | 32 | 24 | .571 | Champions |
| 3 | Alaska Milkmen | 56 | 32 | 24 | .571 | Finalist |
| 4 | Tanduay Rhum Masters | 49 | 28 | 21 | .571 | Finalist |
| 5 | Purefoods TJ Hotdogs | 40 | 20 | 20 | .500 | Semifinalist |
| 6 | Mobiline Phone Pals | 37 | 18 | 19 | .486 | Quarterfinalist |
| 7 | Sta. Lucia Realtors | 41 | 17 | 24 | .415 | Semifinalist |
| 8 | Barangay Ginebra Kings | 41 | 14 | 27 | .341 | Third place |
| 9 | Pop Cola 800s | 33 | 8 | 25 | .242 | Quarterfinalist |

=== Elimination round ===
| Pos | Team | Pld | W | L | PCT |
|---|---|---|---|---|---|
| 1 | Tanduay Rhum Masters | 32 | 21 | 11 | .656 |
| 2 | Alaska Milkmen | 32 | 20 | 12 | .625 |
| 3 | San Miguel Beermen | 32 | 19 | 13 | .594 |
| 4 | Formula Shell Zoom Masters/Velocity | 32 | 18 | 14 | .563 |
| 5 | Purefoods TJ Hotdogs | 32 | 17 | 15 | .531 |
| 6 | Mobiline Phone Pals | 32 | 17 | 15 | .531 |
| 7 | Sta. Lucia Realtors | 32 | 14 | 18 | .438 |
| 8 | Barangay Ginebra Kings | 32 | 10 | 22 | .313 |
| 9 | Pop Cola 800s | 32 | 8 | 24 | .250 |

=== Playoffs ===
| Pos | Team | Pld | W | L |
|---|---|---|---|---|
| 1 | San Miguel Beermen | 23 | 16 | 7 |
| 2 | Formula Shell Zoom Masters/Velocity | 24 | 14 | 10 |
| 3 | Alaska Milkmen | 24 | 12 | 12 |
| 4 | Tanduay Rhum Masters | 17 | 7 | 10 |
| 5 | Barangay Ginebra Kings | 9 | 4 | 5 |
| 6 | Purefoods TJ Hotdogs | 8 | 3 | 5 |
| 7 | Sta. Lucia Realtors | 9 | 3 | 6 |
| 8 | Mobiline Phone Pals | 5 | 1 | 4 |
| 9 | Pop Cola 800s | 1 | 0 | 1 |
