= 1999 PBA Commissioner's Cup =

Second conference of the 1999 PBA season

- Duration: June 27 - September 15, 1999
- TV partner(s): VTV (IBC)

Finals
- Champions: San Miguel Beermen
- Runners-up: Formula Shell Zoom Masters

Awards
- Best Player: Benjie Paras (Formula Shell Zoom Masters)
- Best Import: Terquin Mott (San Miguel Beermen)
- Finals MVP: Danny Seigle (San Miguel Beermen)

PBA Commissioner's Cup chronology
- < 1998 2000 >

PBA conference chronology
- < 1999 All-Filipino 1999 Governors' >

The 1999 Philippine Basketball Association (PBA) Commissioner's Cup was the second conference of the 1999 PBA season. It started on June 27 and ended on September 15, 1999. The tournament is an import-laden format, which requires an import or a pure-foreign player for each team.

== Format ==
The following format will be observed for the duration of the conference:

- One-round eliminations; 8 games per team.
- Quarterfinals: top 4 seeded teams will have twice-to-beat advantage
  - QF1: #1 vs. #8
  - QF2: #2 vs. #7
  - QF3: #3 vs. #6
  - QF4: #4 vs. #5
- Best-of-five semifinals: winners of each pairings
  - QF1 vs QF4
  - QF2 vs.QF3
- For third-place: one-game playoff
- Finals: best-of-seven series

== Elimination round ==
=== Team standings ===
Pos	Team	W	L	PCT	GB	Qualification
1	Alaska Milkmen	6	2	.750	—	Twice-to-beat in the quarterfinals
2	Formula Shell Zoom Masters	5	3	.625	1	Twice-to-beat in the quarterfinals
3	Sta. Lucia Realtors	5	3	.625	1	Twice-to-beat in the quarterfinals
4	San Miguel Beermen	5	3	.625	1	Twice-to-beat in the quarterfinals
5	Tanduay Rhum Masters	5	3	.625	1	Twice-to-win in the quarterfinals
6	Barangay Ginebra Kings	3	5	.375	3	Twice-to-win in the quarterfinals
7	Purefoods TJ Hotdogs	3	5	.375	3	Twice-to-win in the quarterfinals
8	Mobiline Phone Pals	3	5	.375	3	Twice-to-win in the quarterfinals
9	Pop Cola 800s	1	7	.125	5	

Source: PBA.ph

=== Schedule ===
Team ╲ Game	1	2	3	4	5	6	7	8
Alaska Milkmen	SHL	MOB	SLR	BGK	TAN	PF	POP	SMB
Barangay Ginebra Kings	POP	SMB	TAN	ALA	SLR	SHL	PF	MOB
Formula Shell Zoom Masters	ALA	SLR	MOB	PF	POP	BGK	SMB	TAN
Mobiline Phone Pals	SMB	ALA	SHL	SLR	PF	POP	TAN	BGK
Pop Cola 800s	BGK	PF	SMB	TAN	SHL	MOB	ALA	SLR
Purefoods TJ Hotdogs	TAN	POP	SHL	MOB	SMB	ALA	BGK	SLR
San Miguel Beermen	MOB	BGK	POP	SLR	TAN	PF	SHL	ALA
Sta. Lucia Realtors	SHL	ALA	MOB	SMB	BGK	TAN	POP	PF
Tanduay Rhum Masters	PF	BGK	POP	SMB	ALA	SLR	MOB	SHL

= Win; = OT win; = Loss; = OT loss

== Bracket ==
Quarterfinals (Top 4 twice-to-beat)
1	Alaska	88
8	Mobiline	77
4	San Miguel	73
5	Tanduay	67
2	Formula Shell	71	65
7	Purefoods	78	58
3	Sta. Lucia	96
6	Barangay Ginebra	75

Semifinals (Best-of-5)
1	Alaska	2
4	San Miguel	3
2	Formula Shell	3
3	Sta. Lucia	2

Finals (Best-of-7)
4	San Miguel	4
2	Formula Shell	2
Third place playoff
1	Alaska	93
3	Sta. Lucia	88

== Quarterfinals ==
=== (1) Alaska vs. (8) Mobiline ===
VTV

August 13

Alaska Milkmen 88, Mobiline Phone Pals 77
Alaska wins series in one game

Philsports Arena, Pasig

=== (2) Shell vs. (7) Purefoods ===
VTV

August 11

Formula Shell Zoom Masters 71, Purefoods TJ Hotdogs 78

Philsports Arena, Pasig

VTV

August 15

Formula Shell Zoom Masters 65, Purefoods TJ Hotdogs 58
Shell wins series in two games

Philsports Arena, Pasig

=== (3) Sta. Lucia vs. (6) Barangay Ginebra ===
VTV

August 11

Sta. Lucia Realtors 96, Barangay Ginebra Kings 75
Sta. Lucia wins series in one game

Philsports Arena, Pasig

=== (4) San Miguel vs. (5) Tanduay ===
VTV

August 13

San Miguel Beermen 73, Tanduay Rhum Masters 67
San Miguel wins series in one game

Philsports Arena, Pasig

== Semifinals ==
=== (1) Alaska vs. (4) San Miguel ===
VTV

August 18

Alaska Milkmen 79, San Miguel Beermen 68

Philsports Arena, Pasig

VTV

August 20

Alaska Milkmen 78, San Miguel Beermen 86

Philsports Arena, Pasig

VTV

August 25

Alaska Milkmen W, San Miguel Beermen L

Philsports Arena, Pasig

VTV

August 27

Alaska Milkmen 69, San Miguel Beermen 75

Philsports Arena, Pasig

VTV

August 29

Alaska Milkmen 73, San Miguel Beermen 84
San Miguel wins series, 3–2

Philsports Arena, Pasig

=== (2) Shell vs. (3) Sta. Lucia ===
VTV

August 18

Formula Shell Zoom Masters 76, Sta. Lucia Realtors 87

Philsports Arena, Pasig

VTV

August 20

Formula Shell Zoom Masters 87, Sta. Lucia Realtors 73

Philsports Arena, Pasig

VTV

August 25

Formula Shell Zoom Masters 82, Sta. Lucia Realtors 85

Philsports Arena, Pasig

VTV

August 27

Formula Shell Zoom Masters 82, Sta. Lucia Realtors 64

Philsports Arena, Pasig

VTV

August 29

Formula Shell Zoom Masters 65, Sta. Lucia Realtors 62
Shell wins series, 3–2

Philsports Arena, Pasig

== Third place playoff ==
VTV

September 3

Alaska Milkmen 93, Sta. Lucia Realtors 88

Philsports Arena, Pasig

== Finals ==
VTV

September 3

Formula Shell Zoom Masters 64, San Miguel Beermen 68

Philsports Arena, Pasig

VTV

September 5

Formula Shell Zoom Masters 68, San Miguel Beermen 78

Philsports Arena, Pasig

VTV

September 8

Formula Shell Zoom Masters 89, San Miguel Beermen 87 (OT)

Philsports Arena, Pasig

VTV

September 10

Formula Shell Zoom Masters 77, San Miguel Beermen 72

Philsports Arena, Pasig

VTV

September 12

Formula Shell Zoom Masters 85, San Miguel Beermen 89

Philsports Arena, Pasig

VTV

September 15

Formula Shell Zoom Masters 64, San Miguel Beermen 74
San Miguel wins series, 4–2

Philsports Arena, Pasig
