= 1999 PBA Governors' Cup =

- Duration: October 3 - December 12, 1999
- TV partner(s): VTV (IBC)

Finals
- Champions: San Miguel Beermen
- Runners-up: Alaska Milkmen

Awards
- Best Player: Danny Seigle (San Miguel Beermen)
- Best Import: Lamont Strothers (San Miguel Beermen)
- Finals MVP: Danny Seigle and Danny Ildefonso (San Miguel Beermen)

PBA Governors' Cup chronology
- < 1998 2000 >

PBA conference chronology
- < 1999 Commissioner's 2000 All-Filipino >

The 1999 Philippine Basketball Association (PBA) Governors' Cup was the third and last conference of the 1999 PBA season. It started on October 3 and ended on December 12, 1999. The tournament is an import-laden format, which requires an import or a pure-foreign player for each team.

== Format ==
The following format will be observed for the duration of the conference:

- One-round eliminations; 8 games per team.
- Quarterfinals: top 4 seeded teams will have twice-to-beat advantage
  - QF1: #1 vs. #8
  - QF2: #2 vs. #7
  - QF3: #3 vs. #6
  - QF4: #4 vs. #5
- Best-of-five semifinals: winners of each pairings
  - QF1 vs QF4
  - QF2 vs.QF3
- For third-place: one-game playoff
- Finals: best-of-seven series

== Elimination round ==
=== Team standings ===
Pos	Team	W	L	PCT	GB	Qualification
1	Purefoods TJ Hotdogs	7	1	.875 (Note: Head-to-head record: Purefoods 1–0 Tanduay)	—	Twice-to-beat in the quarterfinals
2	Tanduay Rhum Masters	7	1	.875	—	Twice-to-beat in the quarterfinals
3	San Miguel Beermen	6	2	.750	1	Twice-to-beat in the quarterfinals
4	Alaska Milkmen	5	3	.625	2	Twice-to-beat in the quarterfinals
5	Shell Velocity	4	4	.500	3	Twice-to-win in the quarterfinals
6	Sta. Lucia Realtors	3	5	.375 (Note: Head-to-head record: Sta. Lucia 1–0 Mobiline)	4	Twice-to-win in the quarterfinals
7	Mobiline Phone Pals	3	5	.375	4	Twice-to-win in the quarterfinals
8	Barangay Ginebra Kings	1	7	.125	6	Twice-to-win in the quarterfinals
9	Pop Cola 800s	0	8	.000	7	

Source: PBA.ph

=== Schedule ===
Correct as of November 10, 1999

Team ╲ Game	1	2	3	4	5	6	7	8
Alaska Aces	SLR	MOB	TAN	BGK	SMB	PF	POP	SHL
Barangay Ginebra Kings	TAN	PF	SHL	SMB	ALA	MOB	SLR	POP
Mobiline Phone Pals	SHL	ALA	POP	TAN	BGK	SMB	PF	SLR
Pop Cola 800s	PF	SMB	MOB	SLR	SHL	TAN	ALA	BGK
Purefoods TJ Hotdogs	POP	BGK	SMB	SHL	TAN	ALA	MOB	SLR
San Miguel Beermen	POP	PF	BGK	SLR	ALA	MOB	SHL	TAN
Shell Turbo Chargers	MOB	BGK	PF	POP	SLR	TAN	SMB	ALA
Sta. Lucia Realtors	ALA	TAN	POP	SMB	SHL	BGK	PF	MOB
Tanduay Rhum Masters	BGK	SLR	ALA	MOB	PF	POP	SHL	SMB

= Win; = OT win; = Loss; = OT loss

== Bracket ==
Quarterfinals (Top 4 twice-to-beat)
#1 twice-to-beat
1	Purefoods	80
8	Brgy. Ginebra	74
#4 twice-to-beat
4	Alaska	77
5	Shell Velocity	65
#2 twice-to-beat
2	Tanduay	78	84
7	Mobiline	93	75
#3 twice-to-beat
3	San Miguel	82
6	Sta.Lucia	66

Semifinals (best-of-5)
1	Purefoods	0
4	Alaska	3
2	Tanduay	0
3	San Miguel	3

Finals (best-of-7)
4	Alaska	2
3	San Miguel	4
Third place playoff
1	Purefoods	92
2	Tanduay	101

== Quarterfinals ==
=== (1) Purefoods vs. (8) Barangay Ginebra ===
VTV

November 14

Purefoods TJ Hotdogs 80, Barangay Ginebra Kings 74
Purefoods wins series in one game

Philsports Arena, Pasig

=== (2) Tanduay vs. (7) Mobiline ===
VTV

November 12

Tanduay Rhum Masters 78, Mobiline Phone Pals 93

Philsports Arena, Pasig

VTV

November 17

Tanduay Rhum Masters 84, Mobiline Phone Pals 75
Tanduay wins series in two games

Philsports Arena, Pasig

=== (3) San Miguel vs. (6) Sta. Lucia ===
VTV

November 12

San Miguel Beermen 82, Sta. Lucia Realtors 66
San Miguel wins series in one game

Philsports Arena, Pasig

=== (4) Alaska vs. (5) Shell ===
VTV

November 14

Alaska Milkmen 77, Shell Velocity 65
Alaska wins series in one game

Philsports Arena, Pasig

== Semifinals ==
=== (1) Purefoods vs. (4) Alaska ===
VTV

November 19

Purefoods TJ Hotdogs 91, Alaska Milkmen 92

Philsports Arena, Pasig

VTV

November 21

Purefoods TJ Hotdogs 80, Alaska Milkmen 86

Philsports Arena, Pasig

VTV

November 24

Purefoods TJ Hotdogs L, Alaska Milkmen W
Alaska wins series, 3–0

Philsports Arena, Pasig

=== (2) Tanduay vs. (3) San Miguel ===
VTV

November 19

Tanduay Rhum Masters 80, San Miguel Beermen 81

Philsports Arena, Pasig

VTV

November 21

Tanduay Rhum Masters 68, San Miguel Beermen 79

Philsports Arena, Pasig

VTV

November 24

Tanduay Rhum Masters 62, San Miguel Beermen 66
San Miguel wins series, 3–0

Philsports Arena, Pasig

== Third place playoff ==
VTV

November 28

Purefoods TJ Hotdogs 92, Tanduay Rhum Masters 101

Philsports Arena, Pasig

== Finals ==
VTV

November 28

San Miguel Beermen 87, Alaska Milkmen 80 (2OT)

Philsports Arena, Pasig

VTV

December 1

San Miguel Beermen 62, Alaska Milkmen 73

Centennial Arena, Laoag City

VTV

December 3

San Miguel Beermen 82, Alaska Milkmen 88

Philsports Arena, Pasig

VTV

December 5

San Miguel Beermen 76, Alaska Milkmen 65

Philsports Arena, Pasig

VTV

December 10

San Miguel Beermen 74, Alaska Milkmen 68

Philsports Arena, Pasig

VTV

December 12

San Miguel Beermen 72, Alaska Milkmen 69
San Miguel wins series, 4–2

Araneta Coliseum, Quezon City
