= 2006–07 Coca-Cola Tigers season =

- Head coach: Binky Favis
- General Manager: Allan Caidic; JB Bailon
- Owner(s): Coca-Cola Bottlers Philippines

Philippine Cup results
- Record: 5–13 (27.8%)
- Place: 5th
- Playoff finish: Wildcard (Round-robin)

Fiesta Conference results
- Record: 7–11 (38.9%)
- Place: 7th
- Playoff finish: Wildcard 2nd Round

Coca-Cola Tigers seasons

The 2006–07 Coca-Cola Tigers season was the 5th season of the franchise in the Philippine Basketball Association (PBA). The season was notable for drafting Green Archer Joseph Yeo.

== Key dates ==
- August 20: The 2006 PBA Draft took place in Market! Market!, Taguig.

== Draft picks ==
Round	Pick	Player	Height	Position	Nationality	College
1	3	Joseph Yeo	6'1"	Shooting Guard	Philippines	De La Salle
2	12	R.J. Rizada	6'1"	Shooting Guard	Philippines	FEU
2	14	M.C. Caceres	6'5"	Power Forward	Philippines	PSBA
2	15	Chris Pacana	6'1"	Point guard	Philippines	St. Francis
2	16	Mike Gavino	6'4"	Forward/Center	Philippines	UP Diliman
2	17	Ronjay Enrile	6'1"	Point guard	Philippines	Letran

== Occurrences ==
Hector Calma was replaced as general manager by Ginebra manager Allan Caidic. But it wasn't last long and replaced by JB Bailon.

== Roster ==
2006–07 Coca-Cola Tigers roster
Players

Pos.	#	POB	Name	Height	Weight	DOB (YYYY–MM–DD)	From
SG	5	(Philippines)	R.J. Rizada	6 ft 2 in (1.88 m)	185 lb (84 kg)	1982-10-05	Far Eastern
PF	7	(Philippines)	M.C. Caceres	6 ft 5 in (1.96 m)	205 lb (93 kg)	1981-07-31	PSBA
SG	8	(Philippines)	Joseph Yeo	6 ft 1 in (1.85 m)	175 lb (79 kg)	1983-09-07	De La Salle
F	11	(Philippines)	Gerard Francisco	6 ft 3 in (1.91 m)		1977-11-02	UST
F/C	15	(Philippines)	Jason Misolas	6 ft 3 in (1.91 m)	195 lb (88 kg)	1978-09-28	Letran
F/C	16	(Philippines)	Mike Gavino	6 ft 5 in (1.96 m)			UP Diliman
F	19	(Philippines)	Kenneth Duremdes	6 ft 4 in (1.93 m)	190 lb (86 kg)	1974-01-31	Adamson
PG	21	(Philippines)	Ronjay Enrile	6 ft 1 in (1.85 m)	168 lb (76 kg)	1982-08-20	Letran
PG	22	(Philippines)	Chris Pacana	6 ft 1 in (1.85 m)	200 lb (91 kg)	1981-12-24	Saint Francis of Assisi
F	24	(Philippines)	Allan Salangsang	6 ft 5 in (1.96 m)	200 lb (91 kg)	1976-10-15	Letran
F	31	(United States)	John Arigo	6 ft 4 in (1.93 m)	185 lb (84 kg)	1978-12-10	North Florida
G	34	(United States)	William Antonio	6 ft 3 in (1.91 m)	190 lb (86 kg)	1975-08-15	Chaminade
F	40	(Philippines)	Ricky Calimag	6 ft 5 in (1.96 m)	210 lb (95 kg)	1978-06-10	San Beda
G	42	(Philippines)	Kalani Ferreria	6 ft 2 in (1.88 m)		1979-02-04	Moorpark
G	55	(Philippines)	Alex Cabagnot	6 ft 0 in (1.83 m)	180 lb (82 kg)	1982-12-08	Hawaiʻi–Hilo
F	73	(United States)	Ali Peek	6 ft 4 in (1.93 m)	275 lb (125 kg)	1975-02-13	Saint Mary's
C		(Philippines)	Ronald Capati	6 ft 5 in (1.96 m)		1981-05-11	St. Benilde
F		(Philippines)	Neil Rañeses	6 ft 4 in (1.93 m)	190 lb (86 kg)	1981-03-01	Visayas

Coaches
Head coach
- (Philippines) Binky Favis
Assistant(s)
- (Philippines) Mon Jose
- (Philippines) George Ella
- (Philippines) Boybits Victoria
- (Philippines) Richie Ticzon
- (Philippines) Vince Hizon

Legend
- (DP) Unsigned draft pick
- (FA) Free agent
- (S) Suspended
- (I) Import
- Injured

== Records ==
=== Philippine Cup ===
The Giants finished 5th in the standings.

Pos	Team	W	L	PCT	GB	Qualification
1	Barangay Ginebra Kings	13	5	.722 (Note: Head-to-head differential: Barangay Ginebra +1, San Miguel −1)	—	Advance to semifinals
2	San Miguel Beermen	13	5	.722	—	Advance to semifinals
3	Red Bull Barako	11	7	.611	2	Advance to quarterfinals
4	Talk 'N Text Phone Pals	10	8	.556 (Note: Head-to-head differential: Talk 'N Text +4, Purefoods +3, Sta. Lucia −7; fifth-seed playoff: Purefoods 92–78 Sta. Lucia)	3	Advance to quarterfinals
5	Purefoods Chunkee Giants	10	8	.556	3	Advance to quarterfinals
6	Sta. Lucia Realtors	10	8	.556	3	Advance to wildcard round
7	Alaska Aces	8	10	.444	5	Advance to wildcard round
8	Air21 Express	7	11	.389	6	Advance to wildcard round
9	Coca-Cola Tigers	5	13	.278	8	Advance to wildcard round
10	Welcoat Dragons	3	15	.167	10	

==== Wildcard phase ====
Cumulative standings
Pos	Team	W	L	PCT	GB	Qualification
6	Sta. Lucia Realtors	11	10	.524	—	Guaranteed quarterfinals berth playoff (Note: If a team won all wildcard round games and did not finish first, it will playoff with the team that finished first for the quarterfinals berth.)
7	Air21 Express	10	11	.476	1	Qualified to quarterfinals berth playoff
8	Alaska Aces	9	12	.429	2	
9	Coca-Cola Tigers	6	15	.286	5	

Source: PBA.ph
Notes:

Wildcard phase standings
Pos	Team	W	L	Qualification
6	Air21 Express	3	0	Qualified to quarterfinals berth playoff (Note: Quarterfinals berth playoff: Sta. Lucia 121–118 Air21 (OT))
7	Alaska Aces	1	2	
8	Coca-Cola Tigers	1	2	
9	Sta. Lucia Realtors	1	2	

Source: PBA.ph
Notes:

ABC

January 5

Alaska Aces 98, Coca-Cola Tigers 99 (OT)

Araneta Coliseum, Quezon City

ABC

January 7

Coca-Cola Tigers 75, Sta. Lucia Realtors 122

Araneta Coliseum, Quezon City

ABC

January 10

Coca-Cola Tigers 106, Air21 Express 111

Araneta Coliseum, Quezon City

=== Fiesta Conference ===
Pos	Team	W	L	PCT	GB	Qualification
1	Red Bull Barako	13	5	.722	—	Advance to semifinals
2	Alaska Aces	12	6	.667 (Note: Second-seed playoff: Alaska 103–95 Barangay Ginebra)	1	Advance to semifinals
3	Barangay Ginebra Kings	12	6	.667	1	Advance to quarterfinals
4	Talk 'N Text Phone Pals	11	7	.611	2	Advance to quarterfinals
5	Air21 Express	10	8	.556 (Note: Fifth-seed playoff: Air21 103–99 San Miguel)	3	Advance to quarterfinals
6	San Miguel Beermen	10	8	.556	3	Advance to wildcard round
7	Coca-Cola Tigers	7	11	.389	6	Advance to wildcard round
8	Purefoods Tender Juicy Giants	6	12	.333	7	Advance to wildcard round
9	Sta. Lucia Realtors	5	13	.278	8	Advance to wildcard round
10	Welcoat Dragons	4	14	.222	9	

Source: PBA.ph

==== Bracket ====
Wildcard phase (Single elimination)
6	San Miguel	102
9	Sta. Lucia	85
7	Coca-Cola	100
8	Purefoods	97

Wildcard phase (Single elimination)
6	San Miguel	102
7	Coca-Cola	101

Quarterfinals (Best-of-3)
3	Brgy. Ginebra	1
6	San Miguel	2
4	Talk 'N Text	2
5	Air21	1

Semifinals (Best-of-7)
2	Alaska	4
6	San Miguel	2
1	Red Bull	2
4	Talk 'N Text	4

Finals (Best-of-7)
2	Alaska	4
4	Talk 'N Text	3
Third place
6	San Miguel	96
1	Red Bull	103

== Transactions ==
=== Trades ===
==== Pre-season ====
2006	To Coca-Cola Tigers Kalani Ferreria (Brgy. Ginebra), Ryan Bernardo (Air21), Manny Ramos	To Air21 Express Aries Dimaunahan, Ervin Sotto, future draft picks	To Barangay Ginebra Rafi Reavis, Billy Mamaril, rights of Rudy Hatfield

==== Fiesta Conference ====
April 2007	To Coca-Cola Tigers Alex Cabagnot, Kenneth Duremdes, Recaredo Calimag	To Sta. Lucia Realtors Manny Ramos, Denok Miranda, a future first round pick (Coke)

=== Subtractions ===
Player	Fate	New team
Johnny Abarrientos	Waived	Barangay Ginebra
Renato Morano	Waived	None
Dale Singson		Alaska Aces
Rob Wainright		Welcoat Dragons
Gilbert Lao		Welcoat Dragons
Tonyboy Espinosa	Retired	None

=== Imports recruited ===
Player	Debuted
Anthony Johnson	March 4 vs. Welcoat
Jeff Varem	April 20 vs. Barangay Ginebra
Rashad Bell	May 30 vs. Red Bull
