= 2006–07 Air21 Express season =

- Head coach: Bo Perasol

Philippine Cup results
- Record: 7–11 (38.9%)
- Place: 8th
- Playoff finish: Round-robin Wilcard

Fiesta Conference results
- Record: 10–8 (55.6%)
- Place: 5th
- Playoff finish: Quarterfinals

Air21 Express seasons

The 2006–07 Air21 Express season was the 5th season of the franchise in the Philippine Basketball Association (PBA). The season was notable for drafting future superstar Arwind Santos.

In the Philippine Cup, the Express finished in the wildcard round-robin, and ended up against Sta. Lucia Realtors in a knock-out match for final quarterfinal slot, but lost. In the Fiesta Conference, they ended up in the quarterfinals, but lost in Talk 'N Text in 3 games, even they won the Game 1.

== Key dates ==
- August 20: The 2006 PBA Draft took place in Market! Market!, Taguig.

== Draft picks ==
Round	Pick	Player	Height	Position	Nationality	College
1	2	Arwind Santos	6'4"	Forward	Philippines	FEU

== Roster ==
2006–07 Air21 Express roster
Players
Coaches

Pos.	#	POB	Name	Height	Weight	DOB (YYYY–MM–DD)	From
F	5	(United States)	Shawn Daniels (I)	6 ft 8 in (2.03 m)	250 lb (113 kg)		Utah State
F	9	(Philippines)	Niño Canaleta	6 ft 6 in (1.98 m)	200 lb (91 kg)		UE
F/C	13	(Philippines)	Mark Telan	6 ft 7 in (2.01 m)	210 lb (95 kg)		De La Salle
F/C	18	(Philippines)	Yancy De Ocampo	6 ft 8 in (2.03 m)	235 lb (107 kg)		Saint Francis of Assisi
G	19	(Philippines)	Wynne Arboleda	5 ft 11 in (1.80 m)	180 lb (82 kg)		MLQU
G	20	(Philippines)	Gary David	6 ft 2 in (1.88 m)	180 lb (82 kg)		Lyceum
F	29	(Philippines)	Arwind Santos (R)	6 ft 4 in (1.93 m)			Far Eastern
F	33	(Philippines)	Ranidel De Ocampo	6 ft 5 in (1.96 m)	225 lb (102 kg)		Saint Francis of Assisi
G	88	(Philippines)	Aries Dimaunahan	6 ft 0 in (1.83 m)			UST
F	99	(Philippines)	Homer Se	6 ft 6 in (1.98 m)	220 lb (100 kg)		San Sebastian
C		(Philippines)	Ervin Sotto	6 ft 7 in (2.01 m)			Saint Francis of Assisi
C		(Philippines)	Mark Andaya	6 ft 8 in (2.03 m)			Letran

Head coach

- (Philippines) Bo Perasol

Assistant coach(es)

- (Philippines) Ricky Dandan
- (Philippines) Allan Grgegorio
- (Philippines) Johny Tam

Legend

- (C) Team captain
- (CI) Commissioner's Cup Import
- (GI) Governors' Cup Import
- (EI) EASL Import
- (DP) Unsigned draft pick
- (FA) Free agent
- (IN) Inactive
- (S) Suspended
- (R) Rookie
- Injured

== Season ==
=== Philippine Cup ===
==== Team standings ====
Pos	Team	W	L	PCT	GB	Qualification
1	Barangay Ginebra Kings	13	5	.722 (Note: Head-to-head differential: Barangay Ginebra +1, San Miguel −1)	—	Advance to semifinals
2	San Miguel Beermen	13	5	.722	—	Advance to semifinals
3	Red Bull Barako	11	7	.611	2	Advance to quarterfinals
4	Talk 'N Text Phone Pals	10	8	.556 (Note: Head-to-head differential: Talk 'N Text +4, Purefoods +3, Sta. Lucia −7; fifth-seed playoff: Purefoods 92–78 Sta. Lucia)	3	Advance to quarterfinals
5	Purefoods Chunkee Giants	10	8	.556	3	Advance to quarterfinals
6	Sta. Lucia Realtors	10	8	.556	3	Advance to wildcard round
7	Alaska Aces	8	10	.444	5	Advance to wildcard round
8	Air21 Express	7	11	.389	6	Advance to wildcard round
9	Coca-Cola Tigers	5	13	.278	8	Advance to wildcard round
10	Welcoat Dragons	3	15	.167	10	

==== Wildcard phase ====
Cumulative standings
Pos	Team	W	L	PCT	GB	Qualification
6	Sta. Lucia Realtors	11	10	.524	—	Guaranteed quarterfinals berth playoff (Note: If a team won all wildcard round games and did not finish first, it will playoff with the team that finished first for the quarterfinals berth.)
7	Air21 Express	10	11	.476	1	Qualified to quarterfinals berth playoff
8	Alaska Aces	9	12	.429	2	
9	Coca-Cola Tigers	6	15	.286	5	

Source: PBA.ph
Notes:

Wildcard phase standings
Pos	Team	W	L	Qualification
6	Air21 Express	3	0	Qualified to quarterfinals berth playoff (Note: Quarterfinals berth playoff: Sta. Lucia 121–118 Air21 (OT))
7	Alaska Aces	1	2	
8	Coca-Cola Tigers	1	2	
9	Sta. Lucia Realtors	1	2	

Source: PBA.ph
Notes:

ABC

January 5

Sta. Lucia Realtors 99, Air21 Express 121

Araneta Coliseum, Quezon City

ABC

January 7

Air21 Express 112, Alaska Aces 106

Araneta Coliseum, Quezon City

ABC

January 10

Coca-Cola Tigers 106, Air21 Express 111

Araneta Coliseum, Quezon City

=== Quarterfinals berth playoff ===
ABC

January 12

Sta. Lucia Realtors 121, Air21 Express 118 (OT)

Cuneta Astrodome, Pasay

=== Fiesta Conference ===
==== Team standings ====
Pos	Team	W	L	PCT	GB	Qualification
1	Red Bull Barako	13	5	.722	—	Advance to semifinals
2	Alaska Aces	12	6	.667 (Note: Second-seed playoff: Alaska 103–95 Barangay Ginebra)	1	Advance to semifinals
3	Barangay Ginebra Kings	12	6	.667	1	Advance to quarterfinals
4	Talk 'N Text Phone Pals	11	7	.611	2	Advance to quarterfinals
5	Air21 Express	10	8	.556 (Note: Fifth-seed playoff: Air21 103–99 San Miguel)	3	Advance to quarterfinals
6	San Miguel Beermen	10	8	.556	3	Advance to wildcard round
7	Coca-Cola Tigers	7	11	.389	6	Advance to wildcard round
8	Purefoods Tender Juicy Giants	6	12	.333	7	Advance to wildcard round
9	Sta. Lucia Realtors	5	13	.278	8	Advance to wildcard round
10	Welcoat Dragons	4	14	.222	9	

Source: PBA.ph

==== Bracket ====
Wildcard phase (Single elimination)
6	San Miguel	102
9	Sta. Lucia	85
7	Coca-Cola	100
8	Purefoods	97

Wildcard phase (Single elimination)
6	San Miguel	102
7	Coca-Cola	101

Quarterfinals (Best-of-3)
3	Brgy. Ginebra	1
6	San Miguel	2
4	Talk 'N Text	2
5	Air21	1

Semifinals (Best-of-7)
2	Alaska	4
6	San Miguel	2
1	Red Bull	2
4	Talk 'N Text	4

Finals (Best-of-7)
2	Alaska	4
4	Talk 'N Text	3
Third place
6	San Miguel	96
1	Red Bull	103

==== (4) Talk 'N Text vs. (5) Air21 ====
ABC

June 13

Air21 Express 121, Talk 'N Text Phone Pals 102

Araneta Coliseum, Quezon City

ABC

June 15

Air21 Express 92, Talk 'N Text Phone Pals 108

Cuneta Astrodome, Pasay

ABC

June 17

recap

Air21 Express 112, Talk 'N Text Phone Pals 114
Talk 'N Text wins series, 2-1

Araneta Coliseum, Quezon City

== Transactions ==
=== Trades ===
Traded	to	For
Ronald Tubid	Barangay Ginebra Kings	2007 & 2008 2nd round pick/2009 1st round

Traded	to	For
Ryan Bernardo, Bruce Dacia	Three-team trade	Kalani Ferreria, Ervin Sotto, Aries Dimaunahan

=== Subtractions ===
Player	Signed	New team
Gec Chia	March 2007	Barangay Ginebra Kings
