= 2006–07 Sta. Lucia Realtors season =

- Head coach: Alfrancis Chua
- Owner(s): Sta. Lucia Realty and Development Corporation

Philippine Cup results
- Record: 10–8 (55.6%)
- Place: 6th
- Playoff finish: Quarterfinals (Lost to Red Bull, 1-3)

Fiesta Conference results
- Record: 5–13 (27.8%)
- Place: 9th
- Playoff finish: Wildcard First Round (lost to San Miguel)

Sta. Lucia Realtors seasons

The 2006–07 Sta. Lucia Realtors season was the 14th season of the franchise in the Philippine Basketball Association (PBA). The season was notable for drafting Filipino American star Kelly Williams.

The team also notable for trading second year guard Alex Cabagnot and Kenneth Duremdes to the Coca-Cola Tigers in order to ease their salary cap.

== Key dates ==
- August 20: The 2006 PBA Draft took place in Market! Market!, Taguig.

== Draft picks ==
Round	Pick	Player	Height	Position	Nationality	College
1	1	Kelly Williams	6'7"	Forward	United States	Oakland
1	6	Mark Isip	6'4"	Power Forward	Philippines	Far Eastern
2	13	Mark Magsumbol	6'2"	SG / SF	Philippines	Benilde

== Roster ==
2006–07 Sta. Lucia Realtors roster
Players

Pos.	#	POB	Name	Height	Weight	DOB (YYYY–MM–DD)	From
F	3	(Philippines)	Nelbert Omolon	6 ft 4 in (1.93 m)			Philippine Christian
G	6	(Philippines)	Cesar Catli	6 ft 3 in (1.91 m)			Far Eastern
G	8	(Philippines)	Paolo Mendoza	5 ft 11 in (1.80 m)			Philippines
G/F	11	(Philippines)	Mark Magsumbol	6 ft 2 in (1.88 m)			Centro Escolar Las Piñas
C	12	(Philippines)	Mark Isip	6 ft 4 in (1.93 m)			FEU
C	13	(Philippines)	Marlou Aquino	6 ft 9 in (2.06 m)			Adamson
F/C	16	(Philippines)	Dennis Espino (C)	6 ft 6 in (1.98 m)			UST
F	21	(United States)	Kelly Williams	6 ft 7 in (2.01 m)			Oakland
G	25	(Philippines)	Ronnie Bughao	5 ft 11 in (1.80 m)			San Beda
F	28	(Philippines)	Norman Gonzales	6 ft 4 in (1.93 m)			San Beda
G	32	(Philippines)	Denok Miranda	6 ft 0 in (1.83 m)			Far Eastern
C	33	(Philippines)	Manny Ramos	6 ft 7 in (2.01 m)			De La Salle
F		(Philippines)	Alvin Pua	6 ft 5 in (1.96 m)			San Sebastian
F		(United States)	Winston Rock (I)
F		(United States)	Williams Jamaal (I)

Coaches
Head coach
- (Philippines) Alfrancis Chua
Assistant(s)
- (Philippines) Adonis Tierra
- (Philippines) Cholo Martin
- (Philippines) Boyet Fernandez

Legend
- (DP) Unsigned draft pick
- (FA) Free agent
- (S) Suspended
- (I) Imports
- Injured

== Season ==
=== Philippine Cup ===
==== Team standings ====
Pos	Team	W	L	PCT	GB	Qualification
1	Barangay Ginebra Kings	13	5	.722 (Note: Head-to-head differential: Barangay Ginebra +1, San Miguel −1)	—	Advance to semifinals
2	San Miguel Beermen	13	5	.722	—	Advance to semifinals
3	Red Bull Barako	11	7	.611	2	Advance to quarterfinals
4	Talk 'N Text Phone Pals	10	8	.556 (Note: Head-to-head differential: Talk 'N Text +4, Purefoods +3, Sta. Lucia −7; fifth-seed playoff: Purefoods 92–78 Sta. Lucia)	3	Advance to quarterfinals
5	Purefoods Chunkee Giants	10	8	.556	3	Advance to quarterfinals
6	Sta. Lucia Realtors	10	8	.556	3	Advance to wildcard round
7	Alaska Aces	8	10	.444	5	Advance to wildcard round
8	Air21 Express	7	11	.389	6	Advance to wildcard round
9	Coca-Cola Tigers	5	13	.278	8	Advance to wildcard round
10	Welcoat Dragons	3	15	.167	10	

Source: PBA.ph

==== Wildcard phase ====
Cumulative standings
Pos	Team	W	L	PCT	GB	Qualification
6	Sta. Lucia Realtors	11	10	.524	—	Guaranteed quarterfinals berth playoff (Note: If a team won all wildcard round games and did not finish first, it will playoff with the team that finished first for the quarterfinals berth.)
7	Air21 Express	10	11	.476	1	Qualified to quarterfinals berth playoff
8	Alaska Aces	9	12	.429	2	
9	Coca-Cola Tigers	6	15	.286	5	

Source: PBA.ph
Notes:

Wildcard phase standings
Pos	Team	W	L	Qualification
6	Air21 Express	3	0	Qualified to quarterfinals berth playoff (Note: Quarterfinals berth playoff: Sta. Lucia 121–118 Air21 (OT))
7	Alaska Aces	1	2	
8	Coca-Cola Tigers	1	2	
9	Sta. Lucia Realtors	1	2	

Source: PBA.ph
Notes:

ABC

January 5

Sta. Lucia Realtors 99, Air21 Express 121

Araneta Coliseum, Quezon City

ABC

January 7

Coca-Cola Tigers 75, Sta. Lucia Realtors 122

Araneta Coliseum, Quezon City

ABC

January 10

Alaska Aces 99, Sta. Lucia Realtors 91

Araneta Coliseum, Quezon City

==== Quarterfinals berth playoff ====
ABC

January 12

Sta. Lucia Realtors 121, Air21 Express 118 (OT)

Cuneta Astrodome, Pasay

==== Bracket ====
Quarterfinals (Best-of-5)
4	Talk 'N Text	3
5	Purefoods	1
3	Red Bull	3
6	Sta. Lucia	1

Semifinals (Best-of-7)
1	Barangay Ginebra	4
4	Talk 'N Text	2
2	San Miguel	4
3	Red Bull	3

Finals (Best-of-7)
1	Barangay Ginebra	4
2	San Miguel	2
Third place playoff
4	Talk 'N Text	124
3	Red Bull	111

==== Quarterfinals: (3) Red Bull vs. (6) Sta. Lucia ====
Playing all of the available game dates, the Realtors were seen to be tired going into Game One, while the Barakos had their last game a month earlier, receiving a bye up to the quarterfinal round.

The Realtors were tired, head coach Alfrancis Chua said, of losing, at the post-game press conference after their victory at the Araneta Coliseum. On Game 2, Sta. Lucia failed to capitalize on their last-second possessions as the Bulls upended them in overtime. With the series tied, and perhaps the long list of games they've played catching up on them, the Realtors were blown out by Red Bull on the third game at the Yñares Center at Antipolo, where they're beaten only once.

On the fourth game, Sta. Lucia kept up with the Barakos but were outlasted at the fourth quarter to drop out of contention; Red Bull now has four straight semifinals appearances.

ABC

January 14

Red Bull Barako 89, Sta. Lucia Realtors 96

Araneta Coliseum, Quezon City

ABC

January 17

Sta. Lucia Realtors 98, Red Bull Barako 100 (OT)

Cuneta Astrodome, Pasay

ABC

January 19

Red Bull Barako 114, Sta. Lucia Realtors 96

Yñares Center, Antipolo

ABC

January 21

Sta. Lucia Realtors 90, Red Bull Barako 105
Red Bull wins series, 3-1

Cuneta Astrodome, Pasay

=== Fiesta Conference ===
==== Team standings ====
Pos	Team	W	L	PCT	GB	Qualification
1	Red Bull Barako	13	5	.722	—	Advance to semifinals
2	Alaska Aces	12	6	.667 (Note: Second-seed playoff: Alaska 103–95 Barangay Ginebra)	1	Advance to semifinals
3	Barangay Ginebra Kings	12	6	.667	1	Advance to quarterfinals
4	Talk 'N Text Phone Pals	11	7	.611	2	Advance to quarterfinals
5	Air21 Express	10	8	.556 (Note: Fifth-seed playoff: Air21 103–99 San Miguel)	3	Advance to quarterfinals
6	San Miguel Beermen	10	8	.556	3	Advance to wildcard round
7	Coca-Cola Tigers	7	11	.389	6	Advance to wildcard round
8	Purefoods Tender Juicy Giants	6	12	.333	7	Advance to wildcard round
9	Sta. Lucia Realtors	5	13	.278	8	Advance to wildcard round
10	Welcoat Dragons	4	14	.222	9	

Source: PBA.ph

==== Bracket ====
Wildcard phase (Single elimination)
6	San Miguel	102
9	Sta. Lucia	85
7	Coca-Cola	100
8	Purefoods	97

Wildcard phase (Single elimination)
6	San Miguel	102
7	Coca-Cola	101

Quarterfinals (Best-of-3)
3	Brgy. Ginebra	1
6	San Miguel	2
4	Talk 'N Text	2
5	Air21	1

Semifinals (Best-of-7)
2	Alaska	4
6	San Miguel	2
1	Red Bull	2
4	Talk 'N Text	4

Finals (Best-of-7)
2	Alaska	4
4	Talk 'N Text	3
Third place
6	San Miguel	96
1	Red Bull	103

== Transactions ==
=== Trades ===
April 2007	To Sta. Lucia Realtors Manny Ramos, Denok Miranda, a future first-round pick (Coke)	To Coca-Cola Tigers Alex Cabagnot, Kenneth Duremdes, Recaredo Calimag
