= 2006–07 Purefoods Tender Juicy Giants season =

Basketball season of Magnolia Hotshots for 2006-07 PBA season

- Head coach: Ryan Gregorio
- General Manager: Alvin Patrimonio
- Owner(s): San Miguel PureFoods

Philippine Cup results
- Record: 10–8 (55.6%)
- Place: 5th
- Playoff finish: Quarterfinals (lost to Talk 'N Text)

Fiesta Conference results
- Record: 6–12 (33.3%)
- Place: 8th
- Playoff finish: Wildcard First Round (lost to Coca-Cola)

Purefoods Tender Juicy Giants seasons

The 2006–07 Purefoods Tender Juicy Giants season was the 19th season of the franchise in the Philippine Basketball Association (PBA). The team was known as the Purefoods Chunkee Giants in the Philippine Cup.

In the Philippine Cup, they finished fifth and faced the Sta. Lucia Realtors in order to grab the 5th seed and prevent a wildcard round. In the semifinals, the Giants faced the Talk 'N Text Phone Pals. In Game 1, Marc Pingris top-scored with 19 points to draw first blood. However, Pingris himself suffered a broken nose as the Giants were routed, due to a collision with Jimmy Alapag of the Phone Pals. At the ending moments of the game, Paul Artadi and Alapag had an altercation, and both were ejected from the game; Alapag himself was suspended for Game 3 for punching Artadi in the face, with Roger Yap also suspended and received penalty. Also in the Game 3 however, with Pingris wearing a face mask, he was again injured in the second quarter, this time in the left ankle. He did not return, and the Giants were routed by the Phone Pals to lead 2–1. The Phone Pals dethrone the Giants.

== Key dates ==
August 20: The 2006 PBA draft took place at Market! Market! in Bonifacio Global City, Taguig.

Round	Pick	Player	Height	Position	Nationality	College
1	9	Boyet Bautista	5'5"	Point Guard	Philippines	Letran
2	20	Olan Omiping	6'1"	Guard	Philippines	UE

== Roster ==
2006–07 Purefoods Tender Juicy Giants roster
Players

Pos.	#	POB	Name	Height	Weight	DOB (YYYY–MM–DD)	From
G	3	(Philippines)	Boyet Bautista	5 ft 5 in (1.65 m)			Letran
C	5	(Philippines)	Jondan Salvador	6 ft 5 in (1.96 m)			St. Benilde
F	7	(Philippines)	Rey Evangelista	6 ft 3 in (1.91 m)			UST
G	8	(Philippines)	Peter June Simon	6 ft 1 in (1.85 m)			Mindanao
C	10	(Philippines)	Rommel Adducul	6 ft 6 in (1.98 m)			San Sebastian
G	11	(Philippines)	Paul Artadi	5 ft 9 in (1.75 m)			UE
G	13	(Philippines)	Roger Yap	6 ft 0 in (1.83 m)			USJ–R
F	15	(Philippines)	Marc Pingris	6 ft 4 in (1.93 m)			PSBA
G	18	(Philippines)	James Yap	6 ft 3 in (1.91 m)			UE
F	21	(Philippines)	Kerby Raymundo (C)	6 ft 6 in (1.98 m)			Letran
F	28	(Philippines)	Richard Yee	6 ft 4 in (1.93 m)			UST
F	35	(United States)	Marquin Chandler (I)	6 ft 8 in (2.03 m)			San José State
G	40	(United States)	Noy Castillo	6 ft 0 in (1.83 m)			The Citadel

Coaches
Head coach
- (Philippines) Ryan Gregorio
Assistant(s)
- (Philippines) Koy Banal
- (Philippines) Ronnie Magsanoc
- (Philippines) Dayong Mendoza

Legend
- (DP) Unsigned draft pick
- (FA) Free agent
- (S) Suspended
- (I) Import
- Injured

== Records ==
=== Philippine Cup ===
The Giants finished 5th in the standings.

Pos	Team	W	L	PCT	GB	Qualification
1	Barangay Ginebra Kings	13	5	.722 (Note: Head-to-head differential: Barangay Ginebra +1, San Miguel −1)	—	Advance to semifinals
2	San Miguel Beermen	13	5	.722	—	Advance to semifinals
3	Red Bull Barako	11	7	.611	2	Advance to quarterfinals
4	Talk 'N Text Phone Pals	10	8	.556 (Note: Head-to-head differential: Talk 'N Text +4, Purefoods +3, Sta. Lucia −7; fifth-seed playoff: Purefoods 92–78 Sta. Lucia)	3	Advance to quarterfinals
5	Purefoods Chunkee Giants	10	8	.556	3	Advance to quarterfinals
6	Sta. Lucia Realtors	10	8	.556	3	Advance to wildcard round
7	Alaska Aces	8	10	.444	5	Advance to wildcard round
8	Air21 Express	7	11	.389	6	Advance to wildcard round
9	Coca-Cola Tigers	5	13	.278	8	Advance to wildcard round
10	Welcoat Dragons	3	15	.167	10	

Source: PBA.ph

==== Fifth-seed playoff ====
On January 3, the Purefoods Chunkee Giants defeated the Sta. Lucia Realtors, 92–78, at the Cuneta Astrodome. Purefoods advances to the quarterfinals, while Sta. Lucia has to go through the wildcard phase.

ABC

January 3

Purefoods Chunkee Giants 92, Sta. Lucia Realtors 78

Cuneta Astrodome, Pasay

==== Bracket ====
Quarterfinals (Best-of-5)
4	Talk 'N Text	3
5	Purefoods	1
3	Red Bull	3
6	Sta. Lucia	1

Semifinals (Best-of-7)
1	Barangay Ginebra	4
4	Talk 'N Text	2
2	San Miguel	4
3	Red Bull	3

Finals (Best-of-7)
1	Barangay Ginebra	4
2	San Miguel	2
Third place playoff
4	Talk 'N Text	124
3	Red Bull	111

=== Fiesta Conference ===
Pos	Team	W	L	PCT	GB	Qualification
1	Red Bull Barako	13	5	.722	—	Advance to semifinals
2	Alaska Aces	12	6	.667 (Note: Second-seed playoff: Alaska 103–95 Barangay Ginebra)	1	Advance to semifinals
3	Barangay Ginebra Kings	12	6	.667	1	Advance to quarterfinals
4	Talk 'N Text Phone Pals	11	7	.611	2	Advance to quarterfinals
5	Air21 Express	10	8	.556 (Note: Fifth-seed playoff: Air21 103–99 San Miguel)	3	Advance to quarterfinals
6	San Miguel Beermen	10	8	.556	3	Advance to wildcard round
7	Coca-Cola Tigers	7	11	.389	6	Advance to wildcard round
8	Purefoods Tender Juicy Giants	6	12	.333	7	Advance to wildcard round
9	Sta. Lucia Realtors	5	13	.278	8	Advance to wildcard round
10	Welcoat Dragons	4	14	.222	9	

Source: PBA.ph

==== Bracket ====
Wildcard phase (Single elimination)
6	San Miguel	102
9	Sta. Lucia	85
7	Coca-Cola	100
8	Purefoods	97

Wildcard phase (Single elimination)
6	San Miguel	102
7	Coca-Cola	101

Quarterfinals (Best-of-3)
3	Brgy. Ginebra	1
6	San Miguel	2
4	Talk 'N Text	2
5	Air21	1

Semifinals (Best-of-7)
2	Alaska	4
6	San Miguel	2
1	Red Bull	2
4	Talk 'N Text	4

Finals (Best-of-7)
2	Alaska	4
4	Talk 'N Text	3
Third place
6	San Miguel	96
1	Red Bull	103

== Transactions ==
=== Trades ===
mid-season 2007	To Red Bull Barako Don Camaso	To Purefoods Tender Juicy Giants Rommel Adducul
