= 2006–07 Talk 'N Text Phone Pals season =

- Head coach: Derrick Pumaren
- General Manager: Frankie Lim; Virgil Villavicencio (assistant)
- Owner(s): Smart Communications (an MVP Group subsidiary)

Philippine Cup results
- Record: 10–8 (55.6%)
- Place: 4th
- Playoff finish: Semifinals (Lost to Ginebra, 2-4)

Fiesta Conference results
- Record: 11–7 (61.1%)
- Place: 4th
- Playoff finish: Fiesta finals (Lost to Alaska, 3-4)

Talk 'N Text Phone Pals seasons

The 2006–07 Talk 'N Text Phone Pals season was the 17th season of the franchise in the Philippine Basketball Association (PBA).

They secured 4th spot in the Philippine Cup, With the Phone Pals playing with uptempo style of play, they faced the Purefoods Chunkee Giants having a deliberate-type of offense game. In Game 1, Phone Pals lost. At the dying moments of the game, Purefoods' Paul Artadi and Jimmy Alapag had an altercation, and both were ejected from the game; Alapag himself was suspended for Game 3 for punching Artadi in the face.

The Phone Pals dethrone the Giants in Game 4, facing first-seed Barangay Ginebra. The Phone Pals lost Game 1 in a blowout fashion, but with help of Mac Cardona, the Phone Pals won the Game 2 by a clutch trey 99-96. In Game 3, Cardona and former De La Salle teammate Ren-Ren Ritualo combined for 47 points to pull Talk 'N Text to the lead 2–1. Ginebra tied it in Game 4 thanks to Caguioa scored 26 of his 35 points in the second half to keep distance with Talk 'N Text. In Game 5, Ginebra led with 20 points, but Phone Pals crept back and led in the last 2 minutes, until Ginebra cut the lead to one. Due to a failed undergoal stab by Asi Taulava and a Mark Caguioa fast-break and an easy lay-up, Ginebra sealed a 3–2 lead. In Game 6, Phone Pals made a run led by Cardona, scoring 12 points until he was ejected after kicking Tubid on the gut, incurring his own flagrant foul-type 2; At the middle of the fourth quarter, Jay Washington converted a three-point shot to put TNT ahead 83–79. The Phone Pals would miss their next five attempts with the Kings converting 11 points to allow Ginebra to win the game. Cardona would be suspended for the third place playoff and was assessed with a P20,000 fine for his improper behavior. Phone Pals ended up third place.

In the next conference, Phone Pals reached semifinals facing Yeng Guiao-coached Red Bull Barako. Even Red Bull won Game 1, Phone Pals managed to wins two set of back-to back (only losing to Game 4 after losing Game 1) to reach the finals. But in the finals, Phone Pals lost to the Alaska Aces coached by Derrick Pumaren's coaching rival Tim Cone in 7 games.

== Draft picks ==
Round	Pick	Player	Height	Position	Nationality	College
1	8	Mark Andaya	6'9"	Center	Philippines	Letran

== Roster ==
2006–07 Talk 'N Text Phone Pals roster
Players

Pos.	#	POB	Name	Height	Weight	DOB (YYYY–MM–DD)	From
F	0	(United States)	James Sullinger (I)	6 ft 6 in (1.98 m)	196 lb (89 kg)		Ohio State
SF	1	(Philippines)	Abby Santos	6 ft 3 in (1.91 m)			UP Diliman
PG	3	(Philippines)	Jimmy Alapag (N)	5 ft 9 in (1.75 m)			Cal State San Bernardino
G	4	(United States)	Harvey Carey	6 ft 3 in (1.91 m)	210 lb (95 kg)		Sonoma State
F	7	(United States)	Jay Washington	6 ft 7 in (2.01 m)			Eckerd
G	8	(Philippines)	Patrick Fran	6 ft 1 in (1.85 m)			UST
G	9	(Philippines)	Mark Cardona	6 ft 0 in (1.83 m)	180 lb (82 kg)		De La Salle
F	12	(Philippines)	Jonathan Aldave	6 ft 3 in (1.91 m)			Letran
SG	14	(Philippines)	Renren Ritualo (N)	6 ft 0 in (1.83 m)			De La Salle
C	18	(Philippines)	Yancy de Ocampo	6 ft 9 in (2.06 m)	235 lb (107 kg)		Saint Francis of Assisi
F/C	28	(United States)	Miguel Noble	6 ft 5 in (1.96 m)	215 lb (98 kg)		Utica
PG	29	(Philippines)	Egay Billones	5 ft 9 in (1.75 m)	651 lb (295 kg)		Centro Escolar Las Piñas
PF	33	(Philippines)	Victor Pablo	6 ft 4 in (1.93 m)	200 lb (91 kg)		Far Eastern
F	41	(Philippines)	Don Allado	6 ft 6 in (1.98 m)	225 lb (102 kg)		De La Salle
PG	42	(Philippines)	Donbel Belano	5 ft 10 in (1.78 m)	178 lb (81 kg)		Visayas
C	88	(Tonga)	Asi Taulava (N)	6 ft 9 in (2.06 m)	245 lb (111 kg)		BYU–Hawaii

Coaches
Head coach
- (Philippines) Derrick Pumaren (UE)
Assistant(s)
- (Philippines) Bong Ramos (Mapúa)
- (Philippines) Tonichi Yturri (De La Salle)
- (Philippines) Agustin Tiongco
- (Philippines) Bong Ravena (UE)

Legend
- (DP) Unsigned draft pick
- (FA) Free agent
- (S) Suspended
- (I) Import
- (N) Did not play due to NT commitment
- Injured

== Records ==
=== Philippine Cup ===
The Giants finished 5th in the standings.

Pos	Team	W	L	PCT	GB	Qualification
1	Barangay Ginebra Kings	13	5	.722 (Note: Head-to-head differential: Barangay Ginebra +1, San Miguel −1)	—	Advance to semifinals
2	San Miguel Beermen	13	5	.722	—	Advance to semifinals
3	Red Bull Barako	11	7	.611	2	Advance to quarterfinals
4	Talk 'N Text Phone Pals	10	8	.556 (Note: Head-to-head differential: Talk 'N Text +4, Purefoods +3, Sta. Lucia −7; fifth-seed playoff: Purefoods 92–78 Sta. Lucia)	3	Advance to quarterfinals
5	Purefoods Chunkee Giants	10	8	.556	3	Advance to quarterfinals
6	Sta. Lucia Realtors	10	8	.556	3	Advance to wildcard round
7	Alaska Aces	8	10	.444	5	Advance to wildcard round
8	Air21 Express	7	11	.389	6	Advance to wildcard round
9	Coca-Cola Tigers	5	13	.278	8	Advance to wildcard round
10	Welcoat Dragons	3	15	.167	10	

Source: PBA.ph

==== Fifth-seed playoff ====
On January 3, the Purefoods Chunkee Giants defeated the Sta. Lucia Realtors, 92–78, at the Cuneta Astrodome. Purefoods advances to the quarterfinals, while Sta. Lucia has to go through the wildcard phase.

ABC

January 3

Purefoods Chunkee Giants 92, Sta. Lucia Realtors 78

Cuneta Astrodome, Pasay

==== Bracket ====
Quarterfinals (Best-of-5)
4	Talk 'N Text	3
5	Purefoods	1
3	Red Bull	3
6	Sta. Lucia	1

Semifinals (Best-of-7)
1	Barangay Ginebra	4
4	Talk 'N Text	2
2	San Miguel	4
3	Red Bull	3

Finals (Best-of-7)
1	Barangay Ginebra	4
2	San Miguel	2
Third place playoff
4	Talk 'N Text	124
3	Red Bull	111

=== Fiesta Conference ===
Pos	Team	W	L	PCT	GB	Qualification
1	Red Bull Barako	13	5	.722	—	Advance to semifinals
2	Alaska Aces	12	6	.667 (Note: Second-seed playoff: Alaska 103–95 Barangay Ginebra)	1	Advance to semifinals
3	Barangay Ginebra Kings	12	6	.667	1	Advance to quarterfinals
4	Talk 'N Text Phone Pals	11	7	.611	2	Advance to quarterfinals
5	Air21 Express	10	8	.556 (Note: Fifth-seed playoff: Air21 103–99 San Miguel)	3	Advance to quarterfinals
6	San Miguel Beermen	10	8	.556	3	Advance to wildcard round
7	Coca-Cola Tigers	7	11	.389	6	Advance to wildcard round
8	Purefoods Tender Juicy Giants	6	12	.333	7	Advance to wildcard round
9	Sta. Lucia Realtors	5	13	.278	8	Advance to wildcard round
10	Welcoat Dragons	4	14	.222	9	

Source: PBA.ph

==== Bracket ====
Wildcard phase (Single elimination)
6	San Miguel	102
9	Sta. Lucia	85
7	Coca-Cola	100
8	Purefoods	97

Wildcard phase (Single elimination)
6	San Miguel	102
7	Coca-Cola	101

Quarterfinals (Best-of-3)
3	Brgy. Ginebra	1
6	San Miguel	2
4	Talk 'N Text	2
5	Air21	1

Semifinals (Best-of-7)
2	Alaska	4
6	San Miguel	2
1	Red Bull	2
4	Talk 'N Text	4

Finals (Best-of-7)
2	Alaska	4
4	Talk 'N Text	3
Third place
6	San Miguel	96
1	Red Bull	103
