= 2006–07 Red Bull Barako season =

- Head coach: Yeng Guiao
- General Manager: Tony Chua
- Owner(s): Tony Chua

Philippine Cup results
- Record: 11–7 (61.1%)
- Place: 3rd
- Playoff finish: 4th place

Fiesta Conference results
- Record: 13–5 (72.2%)
- Place: 1st
- Playoff finish: 3rd place

Red Bull Barako seasons

The 2006–07 Red Bull Barako season was the 7th season of the franchise in the Philippine Basketball Association (PBA).

== Key dates ==
- August 20: The 2006 PBA draft took place in Fort Bonifacio, Taguig.

== Draft picks ==
Round	Pick	Player	Height	Position	Nationality	College
2	19	Magnum Membrere	6'0"	Guard	Philippines	Ateneo

== Roster ==
2006–07 Red Bull Barako roster
Players

Pos.	#	POB	Name	Height	Weight	DOB (YYYY–MM–DD)	From
G	1	(Philippines)	Celino Cruz	5 ft 9 in (1.75 m)			Far Eastern
G	4	(Philippines)	Warren Ybañez	5 ft 8 in (1.73 m)			PSBA
PG	5	(Philippines)	Topex Robinson	5 ft 8 in (1.73 m)			San Sebastian
F/C	7	(Australia)	Mick Pennisi	6 ft 9 in (2.06 m)			Eastern Michigan
G/F	8	(Philippines)	Cyrus Baguio	6 ft 2 in (1.88 m)			UST
F	10	(Philippines)	Junthy Valenzuela	6 ft 2 in (1.88 m)			SCSIT
F	11	(Philippines)	Rich Alvarez	6 ft 4 in (1.93 m)			Ateneo
G	12	(Philippines)	Larry Fonacier	6 ft 2 in (1.88 m)			Ateneo
C	15	(Philippines)	Mark Kong	6 ft 8 in (2.03 m)			Adamson
PG	16	(Philippines)	Magnum Membrere	5 ft 11 in (1.80 m)	170 lb (77 kg)		Ateneo
F	20	(Philippines)	Leo Najorda	6 ft 3 in (1.91 m)			San Sebastian
F/C	21	(Philippines)	Paolo Bugia	6 ft 6 in (1.98 m)			Ateneo
F	23	(United States)	James Penny (I)	6 ft 6 in (1.98 m)			Texas Christian University
F/C	34	(Philippines)	Carlo Sharma	6 ft 6 in (1.98 m)			De La Salle
F	41	(United States)	Mike Hrabak	6 ft 6 in (1.98 m)			Central Arizona

Coaches

Head coach

- (Philippines) Yeng Guiao

Assistant coach(es)

- (Philippines) Roehl Nadurata
- (Philippines) Gee Abanilla

Legend

- (C) Team captain
- (I) Import
- Injured

== Season ==
=== Philippine Cup ===
==== Team standings ====
Pos	Team	W	L	PCT	GB	Qualification
1	Barangay Ginebra Kings	13	5	.722 (Note: Head-to-head differential: Barangay Ginebra +1, San Miguel −1)	—	Advance to semifinals
2	San Miguel Beermen	13	5	.722	—	Advance to semifinals
3	Red Bull Barako	11	7	.611	2	Advance to quarterfinals
4	Talk 'N Text Phone Pals	10	8	.556 (Note: Head-to-head differential: Talk 'N Text +4, Purefoods +3, Sta. Lucia −7; fifth-seed playoff: Purefoods 92–78 Sta. Lucia)	3	Advance to quarterfinals
5	Purefoods Chunkee Giants	10	8	.556	3	Advance to quarterfinals
6	Sta. Lucia Realtors	10	8	.556	3	Advance to wildcard round
7	Alaska Aces	8	10	.444	5	Advance to wildcard round
8	Air21 Express	7	11	.389	6	Advance to wildcard round
9	Coca-Cola Tigers	5	13	.278	8	Advance to wildcard round
10	Welcoat Dragons	3	15	.167	10	

Source: PBA.ph

==== Bracket ====
Quarterfinals (Best-of-5)
4	Talk 'N Text	3
5	Purefoods	1
3	Red Bull	3
6	Sta. Lucia	1

Semifinals (Best-of-7)
1	Barangay Ginebra	4
4	Talk 'N Text	2
2	San Miguel	4
3	Red Bull	3

Finals (Best-of-7)
1	Barangay Ginebra	4
2	San Miguel	2
Third-place playoff
4	Talk 'N Text	124
3	Red Bull	111

==== Quarterfinals: (3) Red Bull vs. (6) Sta. Lucia ====
Playing all of the available game dates, the Realtors were seen to be tired going into Game One, while the Barakos had their last game a month earlier, receiving a bye up to the quarterfinal round.

The Realtors were tired, head coach Alfrancis Chua said, of losing, at the post-game press conference after their victory at the Araneta Coliseum. On Game 2, Sta. Lucia failed to capitalize on their last-second possessions as the Bulls upended them in overtime. With the series tied, and perhaps the long list of games they've played catching up on them, the Realtors were blown out by Red Bull on the third game at the Yñares Center at Antipolo, where they're beaten only once.

On the fourth game, Sta. Lucia kept up with the Barakos but were outlasted at the fourth quarter to drop out of contention; Red Bull now has four straight semifinals appearances.

ABC

January 14

Red Bull Barako 89, Sta. Lucia Realtors 96

Araneta Coliseum, Quezon City

ABC

January 17

Sta. Lucia Realtors 98, Red Bull Barako 100 (OT)

Cuneta Astrodome, Pasay

ABC

January 19

Red Bull Barako 114, Sta. Lucia Realtors 96

Yñares Center, Antipolo

ABC

January 21

Sta. Lucia Realtors 90, Red Bull Barako 105
Red Bull wins series, 3-1

Cuneta Astrodome, Pasay

==== Semifinals: (2) San Miguel vs. (3) Red Bull ====
San Miguel and Red Bull split their elimination round games as the Beermen eked out the Bulls on the last berth for the semifinals bye; prior to that, the Barakos and the Beermen figured in their own best of seven semifinal at the 2006 PBA Philippine Cup in which the Bulls emerged victorious, via seven games.

Red Bull lead much of the first game, but the Beermen led by Dondon Hontiveros and Danny Ildefonso mounted a 19–2 run to draw first blood. Red Bull then made sure to lead from start to finish as they walloped San Miguel to force a 1–1 tie. On Game 3, San Miguel continued their alternating wins against Red Bull in the playoffs as they pull ahead 2–1; Ildefonso was ejected at the fourth quarter after receiving two technical fouls after a skirmish against Enrico Villanueva and Mick Pennisi.

The pivotal fourth game was nailbiter as both teams exchanged baskets for most of the game until Pennisi, who had a 20% shooting night, converted a three-pointer at the buzzer to tie the series again, at 2–2. San Miguel withheld Red Bull at the fifth game, as they outscored the Bulls from the second half to hold a twice-to-beat advantage going into the sixth game.

Facing elimination, Red Bull engaged San Miguel in a shooting contest until Yeng Guiao was caught throwing an elbow to Dondon Hontiveros; San Miguel assistant coach Biboy Ravanes yelled to the referees while another assistant coach, Pido Jarencio, charged towards the Red Bull bench coming almost in contact with Guiao. When the dust settled, Guiao was assessed with two technical fouls and was ejected; Ravanes and Jarencio each received a technical. San Miguel pulled away but Red Bull chipped the lead to appear at striking distance at the fourth quarter. Celino Cruz converted clutch baskets to give Red Bull the lead 102–100; Seigle missed the potential game-tying jumper as Cruz was fouled on the rebound. Cruz converted his two freethrows to put the lead out of reach for the Beermen to force a Game 7.

After the fracas, Guiao was meted with a one-game suspension which would take place the game after Game 7 and a P30,000 fine; Jarencio was meted a P50,000 fine for improper contact with the referee; his suspension is also deferred the game after Game 7.

In the deciding game 7, San Miguel built a comfortable lead to avoid any Red Bull incursion, the last happened on the 6-minute mark but Hontiveros doused cold water a pair of back to back three-pointers.

ABC

January 24

San Miguel Beermen 114, Red Bull Barako 109

Araneta Coliseum, Quezon City

ABC

January 26

Red Bull Barako 106, San Miguel Beermen 84

Araneta Coliseum, Quezon City

ABC

January 28

San Miguel Beermen 109, Red Bull Barako 82

Araneta Coliseum, Quezon City

ABC

January 31

Red Bull Barako 109, San Miguel Beermen 107

Araneta Coliseum, Quezon City

ABC

February 2

San Miguel Beermen 111, Red Bull Barako 82

Araneta Coliseum, Quezon City

ABC

February 4

Red Bull Barako 104, San Miguel Beermen 100

Araneta Coliseum, Quezon City
Attendance: 18,337

ABC

February 7

San Miguel Beermen 119, Red Bull Barako 115
San Miguel wins series, 4-3

Araneta Coliseum, Quezon City

==== Third place playoff ====
ABC

February 9

Red Bull Barako 111, Talk 'N Text Phone Pals 124
Talk 'N Text wins third-place trophy.

Araneta Coliseum, Quezon City

=== Fiesta Conference ===
==== Team standings ====
Pos	Team	W	L	PCT	GB	Qualification
1	Red Bull Barako	13	5	.722	—	Advance to semifinals
2	Alaska Aces	12	6	.667 (Note: Second-seed playoff: Alaska 103–95 Barangay Ginebra)	1	Advance to semifinals
3	Barangay Ginebra Kings	12	6	.667	1	Advance to quarterfinals
4	Talk 'N Text Phone Pals	11	7	.611	2	Advance to quarterfinals
5	Air21 Express	10	8	.556 (Note: Fifth-seed playoff: Air21 103–99 San Miguel)	3	Advance to quarterfinals
6	San Miguel Beermen	10	8	.556	3	Advance to wildcard round
7	Coca-Cola Tigers	7	11	.389	6	Advance to wildcard round
8	Purefoods Tender Juicy Giants	6	12	.333	7	Advance to wildcard round
9	Sta. Lucia Realtors	5	13	.278	8	Advance to wildcard round
10	Welcoat Dragons	4	14	.222	9	

Source: PBA.ph

==== Bracket ====
Wildcard phase (Single elimination)
6	San Miguel	102
9	Sta. Lucia	85
7	Coca-Cola	100
8	Purefoods	97

Wildcard phase (Single elimination)
6	San Miguel	102
7	Coca-Cola	101

Quarterfinals (Best-of-3)
3	Brgy. Ginebra	1
6	San Miguel	2
4	Talk 'N Text	2
5	Air21	1

Semifinals (Best-of-7)
2	Alaska	4
6	San Miguel	2
1	Red Bull	2
4	Talk 'N Text	4

Finals (Best-of-7)
2	Alaska	4
4	Talk 'N Text	3
Third place
6	San Miguel	96
1	Red Bull	103

==== Semifinals: (1) Red Bull vs. (4) Talk 'N Text ====
ABC

June 22

Talk 'N Text Phone Pals 107, Red Bull Barako 103

Araneta Coliseum, Quezon City

ABC

June 24

Talk 'N Text Phone Pals 105, Red Bull Barako 98

Araneta Coliseum, Quezon City

ABC

June 27

Talk 'N Text Phone Pals 104, Red Bull Barako 111

Araneta Coliseum, Quezon City

ABC

June 29

recap

Talk 'N Text Phone Pals 112, Red Bull Barako 111

Cuneta Astrodome, Pasay

ABC

July 1

Talk 'N Text Phone Pals 122, Red Bull Barako 110
Talk 'N Text wins series, 4-2

Araneta Coliseum, Quezon City

==== Third place playoff ====
ABC

July 4

recap

San Miguel Beermen 96, Red Bull Barako 103
Red Bull wins third-place trophy

Araneta Coliseum, Quezon City

== Transactions ==
=== Trades ===
2006	To Red Bull Barako Migs Noble, Mark Kong, Beermen’s 2007 second round draft pick and 2008 first round pick	To San Miguel Beermen Lordy Tugade, Rommel Adducul, Omanzie Rodriguez	To Barangay Ginebra Kings Paulo Hubalde, Red Bull’s 2007 first round pick

=== Additions ===
Player	Signed	New team
Carlo Sharma	2006	Shell Turbo Chargers

=== Subtractions ===
Player	New team
EJ Feihl	Welcoat Dragons
Migs Noble	Talk 'N Text Phone Pals
