= 2007 PBA Fiesta Conference =

Philippine basketball tournament

- Duration: March 4 – July 20, 2007
- TV partner(s): ABC

Finals
- Champions: Alaska Aces
- Runners-up: Talk 'N Text Phone Pals

Awards
- Best Player: Mark Cardona (Talk 'N Text Tropang Texters)
- Best Import: Rosell Ellis (Alaska Aces)
- Finals MVP: Willie Miller (Alaska Aces)

PBA Fiesta Conference chronology
- < 2005-06 2008 >

PBA conference chronology
- < 2006–07 Philippine 2007–08 Philippine >

The 2007 Philippine Basketball Association (PBA) Fiesta Conference or known as the 2007 Talk 'N Text PBA Fiesta Conference for sponsorship reasons, is the second conference of the 2006-07 season of the Philippine Basketball Association (PBA). Teams are allowed to pick an import with a maximum height-limit of 6-feet, 6-inches tall.

The tournament began on March 4 and finished on July 20. The schedule will be shortened due to the league's commitment to the Philippine national basketball team while 12 players selected by national team head coach Chot Reyes will not play for their mother teams.

Red Bull Barako is the defending champions of the tournament.

Talk 'N Text, a product of Philippine Long Distance Telephone Company, was the main sponsor of the tournament. They also sponsored the 2006-07 PBA Philippine Cup that ended a month before the tournament.

== List of imports ==
The following is the list of imports, which had played for their respective teams at least once, with the returning imports in italics. Highlighted are the imports who stayed with their respective teams for the whole conference.

#	Name	Team	Debuted
1	Alex Compton	Welcoat Dragons	March 4 vs. Coca-Cola
2	Charles Clark III	Welcoat Dragons	March 4 vs. Coca-Cola
3	Anthony Johnson	Coca-Cola Tigers	March 4 vs. Welcoat
4	Jessie King	Purefoods Tender Juicy Giants	March 4 vs. Red Bull
5	James Penny	Red Bull Barako	March 4 vs. Purefoods
6	Shawn Daniels	Air21 Express	March 7 vs. Sta. Lucia
7	Marcellus Christian	Air 21 Express	March 7 vs. Barangay Ginebra
8	Rosell Ellis	Alaska Aces	March 7 vs. Talk 'N Text
9	Rock Winston	Sta. Lucia Realtors	March 7 vs. Air21
10	James Sullinger	Talk 'N Text Phone Pals	March 7 vs. Alaska
11	Vidal Massiah	San Miguel Beermen	March 9 vs. Red Bull
12	Rod Nealy	Barangay Ginebra Kings	March 11 vs. Alaska
13	Paul McMillan	San Miguel Beermen	March 17 vs. Coca-Cola
14	Marquin Chandler	Purefoods Tender Juicy Giants	March 21 vs. San Miguel
15	Galen Young	San Miguel Beermen	April 11 vs. Alaska
16	Rob Sanders	Welcoat Dragons	April 15 vs. San Miguel
17	Jeff Varem	Coca-Cola Tigers	April 20 vs. Barangay Ginebra
18	Wayland White	Welcoat Dragons	May 2 vs. Barangay Ginebra
19	Jamaal Williams	Sta. Lucia Realtors	May 2 vs. Air21
20	Rashad Bell	Coca-Cola Tigers	May 30 vs. Red Bull

Welcoat was allowed to have two imports. Compton, is an American citizen was born in the Philippines and was a member of the several local teams playing as a local.

== Tournament format ==
- Double round eliminations. Worst team would be eliminated.
- Sixth- to ninth-best teams figure in the one-game wildcard playoffs.
  - Sixth seed vs. Ninth seed
  - Seventh seed vs. Eighth seed
  - Winners will figure in a playoff to advance to the quarterfinals.
- Third- to fifth-best teams, and the winner of the wildcards advance to the best-of-three quarterfinals.
  - Third seed vs. winner of wildcards.
  - Fourth seed vs. fifth seed.
- The two best teams and the winners of the quarterfinals advance to the best-of-seven semifinals.
  - First seed vs. winner of the third seed/wildcard winner quarterfinal series
  - Second seed vs. winner of the fourth seed/fifth seed quarterfinal series
- The winners of the semifinals advance to the best-of-seven Finals; the losers figure in a one-game third-place playoff.

== Elimination round ==
=== Team standings ===
Pos	Team	W	L	PCT	GB	Qualification
1	Red Bull Barako	13	5	.722	—	Advance to semifinals
2	Alaska Aces	12	6	.667 (Note: Second-seed playoff: Alaska 103–95 Barangay Ginebra)	1	Advance to semifinals
3	Barangay Ginebra Kings	12	6	.667	1	Advance to quarterfinals
4	Talk 'N Text Phone Pals	11	7	.611	2	Advance to quarterfinals
5	Air21 Express	10	8	.556 (Note: Fifth-seed playoff: Air21 103–99 San Miguel)	3	Advance to quarterfinals
6	San Miguel Beermen	10	8	.556	3	Advance to wildcard round
7	Coca-Cola Tigers	7	11	.389	6	Advance to wildcard round
8	Purefoods Tender Juicy Giants	6	12	.333	7	Advance to wildcard round
9	Sta. Lucia Realtors	5	13	.278	8	Advance to wildcard round
10	Welcoat Dragons	4	14	.222	9	

Source: PBA.ph

== Fifth seed playoff ==
ABC

June 6

San Miguel Beermen 99, Air21 Express 103

Araneta Coliseum, Quezon City

== Second seed playoff ==
ABC

June 6

Barangay Ginebra Kings 95, Alaska Aces 103

Araneta Coliseum, Quezon City

== Bracket ==
Wildcard phase (Single elimination)
6	San Miguel	102
9	Sta. Lucia	85
7	Coca-Cola	100
8	Purefoods	97

Wildcard phase (Single elimination)
6	San Miguel	102
7	Coca-Cola	101

Quarterfinals (Best-of-3)
3	Brgy. Ginebra	1
6	San Miguel	2
4	Talk 'N Text	2
5	Air21	1

Semifinals (Best-of-7)
2	Alaska	4
6	San Miguel	2
1	Red Bull	2
4	Talk 'N Text	4

Finals (Best-of-7)
2	Alaska	4
4	Talk 'N Text	3
Third place
6	San Miguel	96
1	Red Bull	103

== Wildcard playoffs ==
=== First round ===
ABC

June 8

Sta. Lucia Realtors 85, San Miguel Beermen 102

Araneta Coliseum, Quezon City

ABC

June 8

Coca-Cola Tigers 100, Purefoods Tender Juicy Giants 97

Araneta Coliseum, Quezon City

=== Second round ===
ABC

June 10

San Miguel Beermen 102, Coca-Cola Tigers 101

Araneta Coliseum, Quezon City

== Quarterfinals ==
=== (3) Barangay Ginebra vs. (6) San Miguel ===
ABC

June 13

Barangay Ginebra Kings 113, San Miguel Beermen 87

Araneta Coliseum, Quezon City

ABC

June 15

recap

Barangay Ginebra Kings 89, San Miguel Beermen 111

Cuneta Astrodome, Pasay

ABC

June 17

Barangay Ginebra Kings 114, San Miguel Beermen 117 (OT)
San Miguel wins series, 2–1

Araneta Coliseum, Quezon City
Attendance: 13,089

=== (4) Talk 'N Text vs. (5) Air22 ===
ABC

June 13

Talk 'N Text Phone Pals 102, Air21 Express 121

Araneta Coliseum, Quezon City

ABC

June 15

Talk 'N Text Phone Pals 108, Air21 Express 92

Cuneta Astrodome, Pasay

ABC

June 17

recap

Talk 'N Text Phone Pals 114, Air21 Express 112
Talk 'N Text wins series, 2–1

Araneta Coliseum, Quezon City

== Semifinals ==
=== (1) Red Bull vs. (4) Talk 'N Text ===
ABC

June 20

Red Bull Barako 107, Talk 'N Text Phone Pals 101

Araneta Coliseum, Quezon City

ABC

June 22

Red Bull Barako 103, Talk 'N Text Phone Pals 107

Araneta Coliseum, Quezon City

ABC

June 24

Red Bull Barako 98, Talk 'N Text Phone Pals 105

Araneta Coliseum, Quezon City

ABC

June 27

Red Bull Barako 111, Talk 'N Text Phone Pals 104

Araneta Coliseum, Quezon City

ABC

June 29

recap

Red Bull Barako 111, Talk 'N Text Phone Pals 112

Cuneta Astrodome, Pasay

ABC

July 1

Red Bull Barako 110, Talk 'N Text Phone Pals 122
Talk 'N Text wins series, 4–2

Araneta Coliseum, Quezon City

=== (2) Alaska vs. (6) San Miguel ===
ABC

June 20

Alaska Aces 100, San Miguel Beermen 99

Araneta Coliseum, Quezon City

ABC

June 22

Alaska Aces 93, San Miguel Beermen 68

Araneta Coliseum, Quezon City

ABC

June 24

Alaska Aces 81, San Miguel Beermen 91

Araneta Coliseum, Quezon City

ABC

June 27

recap

Alaska Aces 93, San Miguel Beermen 87

Araneta Coliseum, Quezon City

ABC

June 29

Alaska Aces 108, San Miguel Beermen 126

Cuneta Astrodome, Pasay

ABC

July 1

Alaska Aces 113, San Miguel Beermen 109 (2OT)
Alaska wins series, 4–2

Araneta Coliseum, Quezon City

== Third place playoff ==
ABC

July 4

recap

Red Bull Barako 103, San Miguel Beermen 96
Red Bull wins third-place trophy

Araneta Coliseum, Quezon City

== Finals ==
Prior to Game 1, Sandwich performed "Laban kung Laban," the TV theme song of the PBA.

ABC

July 6
7:30 P.M.

boxscore

Alaska Aces 113, Talk 'N Text Phone Pals 85
Scoring by quarter: 16-29, 28-16, 19-37, 22-31
Pts: Cortez, Ellis 22 each Rebs: Rosell Ellis 13; Asts: Rosell Ellis 10	Pts: James Sullinger 25; Rebs: James Sullinger 12; Asts: Mark Cardona 3

Araneta Coliseum, Quezon City
Referees: Cruz, Herrera, Ferrer

ABC

July 8
6:30 P.M.

boxscore

Alaska Aces 113, Talk 'N Text Phone Pals 120
Scoring by quarter: 25-30, 28-30, 31-33, 27-29
Pts: Rosell Ellis 40; Rebs: Rosell Ellis 18; Asts: Rosell Ellis 7	Pts: Mark Cardona 30; Rebs: Yancy de Ocampo 9 Asts: Mark Cardona 5

Araneta Coliseum, Quezon City
Referees: Calungcaguin, Aldaba, Ferrer

ABC

July 11
7:30 P.M.

boxscore

Alaska Aces 87, Talk 'N Text Phone Pals 95
Scoring by quarter: 25-26, 15-30, 27-12, 28-19
Pts: Willie Miller 29; Rebs: Rosell Ellis 13; Asts: Ellis, Hugnatan 3 each	Pts: James Sullinger 30; Rebs: James Sullinger 15; Asts: James Sullinger 8

Araneta Coliseum, Quezon City
Referees: Montiel, Herrera, Canizares

ABC

July 13
7:30 P.M.

boxscore

Alaska Aces 86, Talk 'N Text Phone Pals 82
Scoring by quarter: 18-24, 25-21, 23-18, 16-23
Pts: Willie Miller 29; Rebs: Rosell Ellis 14; Asts: Willie Miller 4	Pts: James Sullinger 26; Rebs: James Sullinger 13; Asts: Donbel Belano 5

Araneta Coliseum, Quezon City
Referees: Canizares, Aldaba, Cruz

ABC

July 15
6:30 p.m.

boxscore

Alaska Aces 104, Talk 'N Text Phone Pals 107
Scoring by quarter: 23-20, 31-25, 25-27, 28-32
Pts: Rosell Ellis 28; Rebs: Rosell Ellis 16; Asts: Miller, Ellis 5 each	Pts: James Sullinger 24; Rebs: Sullinger, Carey 8 each Asts: Mark Cardona 5

Araneta Coliseum, Quezon City
Attendance: 11,097
Referees: Quilinguen, Herrera, Montiel

ABC

July 18
7:05 p.m.

boxscore

Alaska Aces 121, Talk 'N Text Phone Pals 110
Scoring by quarter: 11-34, 34-22, 31-38, 34-27
Pts: Willie Miller 37; Rebs: Rosell Ellis 16; Asts: Cortez, Ellis 8 each	Pts: Mark Cardona 29; Rebs: James Sullinger 9 Asts: James Sullinger 3

Araneta Coliseum, Quezon City
Referees: Cruz, Calungcaguin, Canizares

ABC

July 20
7:05 P.M.

boxscore

Alaska Aces 99, Talk 'N Text Phone Pals 96
Scoring by quarter: 27-20, 26-25, 19-25, 24-29
Pts: Ellis 30; Rebs: Ellis 10; Asts: Ellis 9	Pts: Sullinger 30; Rebs: Sullinger 13; Asts: Sullinger 5
Alaska wins series 4–3

Cuneta Astrodome, Pasay
Attendance: 10,040
Referees: Quilinguen, Aldaba, Calungcaguin

On Game 1, the Phone Pals raced into a twenty-point lead at the first quarter but the Aces chipped in to lead by a point by halftime. The Phone Pals lost steam as the Aces won the first game. The Phone Pals reversed the roles as the Aces themselves lost steam at the ends of Games 2 and 3 for a Phone Pals 2–1 series lead.

With a 1–3 deficit looming, newly crowned MVP Willie Miller stepped up his performance as he tied his conference-high 29 points to lead the Aces into victory on Game 4. Conference Best Player Mark Cardona blew the Phone Pals chances' when he turned the ball over with 4 seconds with a 2-point deficit to lead a Rosell Ellis tip-in from a Sonny Thoss missed lay-up.

On Game 5, Willie Miller turned cold when the Phone Pals started pulling away. The Piltel franchise notched win #3 to assure a twice-to-beat advantage. Miller, who was severely criticized by a lackluster performance by the MVP, answered his critics with a 37-point output (the best in the Finals by a local) to lead the Aces to a Game 6 win and to force a Game 7.
