= 2006–07 PBA Philippine Cup =

- Duration: September 28, 2006 – February 23, 2007
- TV partner(s): ABC (Local); The Filipino Channel (International)

Finals
- Champions: Barangay Ginebra Kings
- Runners-up: San Miguel Beermen

Awards
- Best Player: Mark Caguioa (Barangay Ginebra Kings)
- Finals MVP: Jayjay Helterbrand (Barangay Ginebra Kings)

PBA Philippine Cup chronology
- < 2006 2007–08 >

PBA conference chronology
- < 2006 Philippine 2007 Fiesta >

The 2006–07 Philippine Basketball Association (PBA) Philippine Cup or known as the 2006–07 Talk 'N Text PBA Philippine Cup for sponsorship reasons, is the first conference of the 2006–07 PBA season. It started on September 28, 2006, in Guam and ended on February 7, 2007.

== Format ==
- Double-round robin eliminations; 18 games per team; Teams are then seeded by basis on win–loss records. Ties are broken among points differences of the tied teams.
- Teams seeded #6, #7, #8 and #9 play in a single-round robin wildcard playoffs for the final berth in the quarterfinals.
  - Records from the elimination round are carried over; the team that emerges at the top of the standings advances to the quarterfinals.
  - If a team wins all of its games but still does not emerge at the top of the group, a one-game playoff will be held between the unbeaten team and the top team.
- #3, #4 and #5 teams automatically advance to the best of five quarterfinals:
  - #3 team vs. winner of wildcard playoffs
  - #4 vs. #5 teams
- #1 and #2 teams automatically advance to the best of seven semifinals:
  - Winner of first quarterfinal vs. #1
  - Winner of second quarterfinal vs. #2
- The winners in the semifinals advance to the best of seven finals. The losers dispute the third-place trophy in a one-game playoff.

== Elimination round ==
=== Team standings ===
Pos	Team	W	L	PCT	GB	Qualification
1	Barangay Ginebra Kings	13	5	.722 (Note: Head-to-head differential: Barangay Ginebra +1, San Miguel −1)	—	Advance to semifinals
2	San Miguel Beermen	13	5	.722	—	Advance to semifinals
3	Red Bull Barako	11	7	.611	2	Advance to quarterfinals
4	Talk 'N Text Phone Pals	10	8	.556 (Note: Head-to-head differential: Talk 'N Text +4, Purefoods +3, Sta. Lucia −7; fifth-seed playoff: Purefoods 92–78 Sta. Lucia)	3	Advance to quarterfinals
5	Purefoods Chunkee Giants	10	8	.556	3	Advance to quarterfinals
6	Sta. Lucia Realtors	10	8	.556	3	Advance to wildcard round
7	Alaska Aces	8	10	.444	5	Advance to wildcard round
8	Air21 Express	7	11	.389	6	Advance to wildcard round
9	Coca-Cola Tigers	5	13	.278	8	Advance to wildcard round
10	Welcoat Dragons	3	15	.167	10	

Source: PBA.ph

=== Fifth-seed playoff ===
On January 3, the Purefoods Chunkee Giants defeated the Sta. Lucia Realtors, 92–78, at the Cuneta Astrodome. Purefoods advances to the quarterfinals, while Sta. Lucia has to go through the wildcard phase.

ABC

January 3

Purefoods Chunkee Giants 92, Sta. Lucia Realtors 78

Cuneta Astrodome, Pasay

== Wildcard phase ==
Overall standings
Pos	Team	W	L	PCT	GB	Qualification
6	Sta. Lucia Realtors	11	10	.524	—	Guaranteed quarterfinals berth playoff (Note: If a team won all wildcard round games and did not finish first, it will playoff with the team that finished first for the quarterfinals berth.)
7	Air21 Express	10	11	.476	1	Qualified to quarterfinals berth playoff
8	Alaska Aces	9	12	.429	2	
9	Coca-Cola Tigers	6	15	.286	5	

Source: PBA.ph
Notes:

Wildcard phase standings
Pos	Team	W	L	Qualification
6	Air21 Express	3	0	Qualified to quarterfinals berth playoff (Note: Quarterfinals berth playoff: Sta. Lucia 121–118 Air21 (OT))
7	Alaska Aces	1	2	
8	Coca-Cola Tigers	1	2	
9	Sta. Lucia Realtors	1	2	

Source: PBA.ph
Notes:

ABC

January 5

Alaska Aces 98, Coca-Cola Tigers 99 (OT)

Araneta Coliseum, Quezon City

ABC

January 5

Sta. Lucia Realtors 99, Air21 Express 121

Araneta Coliseum, Quezon City

ABC

January 7

Coca-Cola Tigers 75, Sta. Lucia Realtors 122

Araneta Coliseum, Quezon City

ABC

January 7

Air21 Express 112, Alaska Aces 106

Araneta Coliseum, Quezon City

ABC

January 10

Alaska Aces 99, Sta. Lucia Realtors 91

Araneta Coliseum, Quezon City

ABC

January 10

Coca-Cola Tigers 106, Air21 Express 111

Araneta Coliseum, Quezon City

== Quarterfinals berth playoff ==
With Air21 sweeping the wildcard phase, and Sta. Lucia emerging on top of the wildcard standings, an elimination game was played to determine which team will advance to the quarterfinals.

ABC

January 12

Sta. Lucia Realtors 121, Air21 Express 118 (OT)

Cuneta Astrodome, Pasay

== Bracket ==
Quarterfinals (Best-of-5)
4	Talk 'N Text	3
5	Purefoods	1
3	Red Bull	3
6	Sta. Lucia	1

Semifinals (Best-of-7)
1	Barangay Ginebra	4
4	Talk 'N Text	2
2	San Miguel	4
3	Red Bull	3

Finals (Best-of-7)
1	Barangay Ginebra	4
2	San Miguel	2
Third-place playoff
4	Talk 'N Text	124
3	Red Bull	111

== Quarterfinals ==
=== (3) Red Bull vs. (6) Sta. Lucia ===
Playing all of the available game dates, the Realtors were seen to be tired going into Game One, while the Barakos had their last game a month earlier, receiving a bye up to the quarterfinal round.

The Realtors were tired, head coach Alfrancis Chua said, of losing, at the post-game press conference after their victory at the Araneta Coliseum. On Game 2, Sta. Lucia failed to capitalize on their last-second possessions as the Bulls upended them in overtime. With the series tied, and perhaps the long list of games they've played catching up on them, the Realtors were blown out by Red Bull on the third game at the Yñares Center at Antipolo, where they're beaten only once.

On the fourth game, Sta. Lucia kept up with the Barakos but were outlasted at the fourth quarter to drop out of contention; Red Bull now has four straight semifinals appearances.

ABC

January 14

Red Bull Barako 89, Sta. Lucia Realtors 96

Araneta Coliseum, Quezon City

ABC

January 17

Red Bull Barako 100, Sta. Lucia Realtors 98 (OT)

Cuneta Astrodome, Pasay

ABC

January 19

Red Bull Barako 114, Sta. Lucia Realtors 96

Yñares Center, Antipolo

ABC

January 21

Red Bull Barako 105, Sta. Lucia Realtors 90
Red Bull wins series, 3–1

Cuneta Astrodome, Pasay

=== (4) Talk 'N Text vs. (5) Purefoods ===
Defeating the Realtors on the fifth-seed game, the Giants availed themselves of a week's rest to prepare for the Phone Pals. With the elimination round series split at 1–1, with the last game needing three overtimes to finish, the series was seen as opposites with Purefoods having a deliberate-type of offense while Talk 'N Text going for the uptempo style of play.

In the first game of the series, Marc Pingris of Purefoods top-scored with 19 points to draw first blood. However, Pingris himself suffered a broken nose as the Giants were routed. At the dying moments of the game, Purefoods' Paul Artadi and Jimmy Alapag of the Phone Pals had an altercation, and both were ejected from the game; Alapag himself was suspended for Game 3 for punching Artadi in the face. In the third game however, with Pingris wearing a face mask, he was again injured in the second quarter, this time in the left ankle. He did not return, and the Giants were routed by the Phone Pals to lead 2–1.

The Phone Pals dethrone the Giants as Purefoods ran out of gas in Game 4. Talk 'N Text would face first-seed Barangay Ginebra, a team they've beaten twice in two meetings at the semifinals.

ABC

January 14

Talk 'N Text Phone Pals 84, Purefoods Chunkee Giants 87

Araneta Coliseum, Quezon City

ABC

January 17

Talk 'N Text Phone Pals 110, Purefoods Chunkee Giants 92

Cuneta Astrodome, Pasay

ABC

January 19

Talk 'N Text Phone Pals 102, Purefoods Chunkee Giants 78

Yñares Center, Antipolo

ABC

January 21

Talk 'N Text Phone Pals 115, Purefoods Chunkee Giants 96
Talk 'N Text wins series, 3–1

Cuneta Astrodome, Pasay

== Semifinals ==
=== (1) Barangay Ginebra vs. (4) Talk 'N Text ===
Ginebra was seen as one of the preseason bets to win the championship as they've revamped their lineup, taking in trades from Coca-Cola and Air21. Ginebra finished with a 13–5 record, tied for the first seed, taking a bye up to the semifinals. Talk 'N Text, on the other hand, actually beat the Kings in their elimination round meetings.

Ginebra, despite having a month's rest, was dealt with a blow when team captain Eric Menk was injured in a bar brawl. Menk would not be able to play in the semifinals.

Game 1 saw Ginebra blow out the Phone Pals as the league's scoring leader Mark Caguioa pumped in 34 points. The Phone Pals bounced back in Game 2 as Mark Cardona converted a three-point shot at the buzzer. With momentum on their side, Cardona and former De La Salle teammate Ren-Ren Ritualo combined for 47 points to pull Talk 'N Text to the lead 2–1. Ginebra then leveled the series 2–2 when Caguioa scored 26 of his 35 points in the second half to keep distance with Talk 'N Text.

Ginebra and Talk 'N Text then engaged in a hard-fought Game 5. with the Kings leading 20 by the end of the second quarter. Talk 'N Text crept back and led for the final two minutes, until Ginebra cut the lead to one point. With Phone Pals having the possession, Asi Taulava failed to convert an undergoal stab which led to the Ginebra fastbreak with Mark Caguioa having an easy lay-up. The Kings never looked back as they sealed a 3–2 lead.

With their backs against the wall, the Phone Pals made a blistering start but the Kings were able to catch up and remain within striking distance. Ginebra's Ronald Tubid was called for a flagrant foul-type 1 after harassing TNT's Felix Belano. Cardona led the charge for the Phone Pals, scoring 12 points until he was ejected after kicking Tubid on the gut, incurring his own flagrant foul-type 2; Belano returned the favor as he incurred another flagrant foul-type 1 on Tubid on the fourth quarter. At the middle of the fourth quarter, Jay Washington converted a three-point shot to put TNT ahead 83–79. The Phone Pals would miss their next five attempts with the Kings converting 11 points to allow Ginebra to win the game. Caguioa sat out the last few minutes due to cramps as Johnny Abarrientos of Ginebra overtook Ramon Fernandez in the all-time Steals list with 1,302 career steals.

Cardona would be suspended for the third place playoff and was assessed with a P20,000 fine for his improper behavior.

ABC

January 24

Talk 'N Text Phone Pals 100, Barangay Ginebra Kings 115

Araneta Coliseum, Quezon City

ABC

January 26

Talk 'N Text Phone Pals 99, Barangay Ginebra Kings 96

Araneta Coliseum, Quezon City

ABC

January 28

Talk 'N Text Phone Pals 109, Barangay Ginebra Kings 100

Araneta Coliseum, Quezon City
Attendance: 17,875

ABC

January 31

Talk 'N Text Phone Pals 103, Barangay Ginebra Kings 110

Araneta Coliseum, Quezon City

ABC

February 2

Talk 'N Text Phone Pals 105, Barangay Ginebra Kings 108

Araneta Coliseum, Quezon City
Attendance: 14,897

ABC

February 4

Talk 'N Text Phone Pals 89, Barangay Ginebra Kings 98
Barangay Ginebra wins series, 4–2

Araneta Coliseum, Quezon City
Attendance: 18,337

=== (2) San Miguel vs. (3) Red Bull ===
San Miguel and Red Bull split their elimination round games as the Beermen eked out the Bulls on the last berth for the semifinals bye; prior to that, the Barakos and the Beermen figured in their own best of seven semifinal at the 2006 PBA Philippine Cup in which the Bulls emerged victorious, via seven games.

Red Bull lead much of the first game, but the Beermen led by Dondon Hontiveros and Danny Ildefonso mounted a 19–2 run to draw first blood. Red Bull then made sure to lead from start to finish as they walloped San Miguel to force a 1–1 tie. On Game 3, San Miguel continued their alternating wins against Red Bull in the playoffs as they pull ahead 2–1; Ildefonso was ejected at the fourth quarter after receiving two technical fouls after a skirmish against Enrico Villanueva and Mick Pennisi.

The pivotal fourth game was nailbiter as both teams exchanged baskets for most of the game until Pennisi, who had a 20% shooting night, converted a three-pointer at the buzzer to tie the series again, at 2–2. San Miguel withheld Red Bull at the fifth game, as they outscored the Bulls from the second half to hold a twice-to-beat advantage going into the sixth game.

Facing elimination, Red Bull engaged San Miguel in a shooting contest until Yeng Guiao was caught throwing an elbow to Dondon Hontiveros; San Miguel assistant coach Biboy Ravanes yelled to the referees while another assistant coach, Pido Jarencio, charged towards the Red Bull bench coming almost in contact with Guiao. When the dust settled, Guiao was assessed with two technical fouls and was ejected; Ravanes and Jarencio each received a technical. San Miguel pulled away but Red Bull chipped the lead to appear at striking distance at the fourth quarter. Celino Cruz converted clutch baskets to give Red Bull the lead 102–100; Seigle missed the potential game-tying jumper as Cruz was fouled on the rebound. Cruz converted his two freethrows to put the lead out of reach for the Beermen to force a Game 7.

After the fracas, Guiao was meted with a one-game suspension which would take place the game after Game 7 and a P30,000 fine; Jarencio was meted a P50,000 fine for improper contact with the referee; his suspension is also deferred the game after Game 7.

In the deciding game 7, San Miguel built a comfortable lead to avoid any Red Bull incursion, the last happened on the 6-minute mark but Hontiveros doused cold water a pair of back to back three-pointers.

ABC

January 24

San Miguel Beermen 114, Red Bull Barako 109

Araneta Coliseum, Quezon City

ABC

January 26

San Miguel Beermen 84, Red Bull Barako 106

Araneta Coliseum, Quezon City

ABC

January 28

San Miguel Beermen 109, Red Bull Barako 82

Araneta Coliseum, Quezon City

ABC

January 31

San Miguel Beermen 107, Red Bull Barako 109

Araneta Coliseum, Quezon City

ABC

February 2

San Miguel Beermen 111, Red Bull Barako 82

Araneta Coliseum, Quezon City

ABC

February 4

San Miguel Beermen 100, Red Bull Barako 104

Araneta Coliseum, Quezon City
Attendance: 18,337

ABC

February 7

San Miguel Beermen 119, Red Bull Barako 115
San Miguel wins series, 4–3

Araneta Coliseum, Quezon City

== Third place playoff ==
ABC

February 9

Red Bull Barako 111, Talk 'N Text Phone Pals 124
Talk 'N Text wins third-place trophy.

Araneta Coliseum, Quezon City

== Finals ==
ABC

February 9

Barangay Ginebra Kings 94, San Miguel Beermen 118

Araneta Coliseum, Quezon City

ABC

February 11

Barangay Ginebra Kings 101, San Miguel Beermen 104

Araneta Coliseum, Quezon City

ABC

February 14

Barangay Ginebra Kings 131, San Miguel Beermen 101

Cuneta Astrodome, Pasay

ABC

February 16

Barangay Ginebra Kings 146, San Miguel Beermen 111

Araneta Coliseum, Quezon City

ABC

February 21

Barangay Ginebra Kings 94, San Miguel Beermen 82

Araneta Coliseum, Quezon City

ABC

February 23

Barangay Ginebra Kings 96, San Miguel Beermen 94
Barangay Ginebra wins series, 4–2

Araneta Coliseum, Quezon City

The Beermen started Game 1 with an unconventional starting lineup, with Olsen Racela sitting on the bench being replaced by LA Tenorio. Chot Reyes' gamble paid off as Tenorio's defense led to several botched plays by Jayjay Helterbrand. Helterbrand's backcourt partner, Mark Caguioa didn't have support from his teammates as San Miguel's Lordy Tugade shot the lights out at the Araneta Coliseum. The Kings tried to make incursions but Dorian Peña and Danny Seigle had answers for the Kings' comeback bid, as the Beermen drew first blood in the series.

In the second game, the Kings managed to keep the score close up to halftime. By the third quarter, SMB unleashed a run to lead by 14 by the end of the third quarter. The Kings, crept up to trail 101–99 with 24 seconds remaining. Rafi Reavis, who was previously coached by Beermen head coach Chot Reyes on the Coca-Cola Tigers, was fouled in the ensuing sideline inbound. Reavis flubbed both freethrows as the Beermen escaped to take a 2–0 lead.

Ginebra then answered with three consecutive 2-digit wins against San Miguel—first, a 30-point Game 3 win, then a 35-point Game 4 win, and finally 12-point Game 5 win to lead the series at 3–2. On Game 6, Ginebra leaned on the exploits of Helterbrand and Sunday Salvacion and their zone defense to escape with a 96–94 victory, sweeping the last four games. Helterbrand was named as the Finals MVP.
