= Magnum Membrere =

Filipino basketball player and executive

NLEX Road Warriors
- Position: Assistant manager
- League: PBA

Personal information
- Born: July 20, 1982 (age 44) Umingan, Pangasinan, Philippines
- Listed height: 5 ft 11 in (1.80 m)
- Listed weight: 170 lb (77 kg)

Career information
- High school: San Beda (Manila)
- College: Ateneo
- PBA draft: 2006: 2nd round, 19th overall pick
- Drafted by: Red Bull Barako
- Playing career: 2006–2010; 2011–2012
- Number: 5, 16
- Coaching career: 2010–2011

Career history

Playing
- 2006–2010: Barako Bull Energy Boosters
- 2011–2012: Talk 'N Text Tropang Texters

Coaching
- 2010–2011: Barako Bull Energy Boosters (assistant)

Career highlights
- As player: PBA champion (2011–12 Philippine); UAAP champion (2002); As executive: PBA champion (2015 Commissioner's)

Benedicto "Magnum" L. Membrere III (born July 20, 1982, in Pangasinan) is a Filipino former professional basketball player and executive who currently serves as assistant team manager for NLEX Road Warriors since 2023. He also formerly served as assistant team manager of TNT Tropang Giga from 2014 until 2018.

He was drafted nineteenth overall by Red Bull in 2006 and played there for 4 seasons. He also had a brief stint as an assistant coach for the Boosters, before returning to playing court as a member of the Talk 'N Text Tropang Texters.

== PBA career statistics ==
Legend
GP	Games played	MPG	Minutes per game
FG%	Field-goal percentage	3P%	3-point field-goal percentage	FT%	Free-throw percentage
RPG	Rebounds per game	APG	Assists per game	SPG	Steals per game
BPG	Blocks per game	PPG	Points per game	**Bold**	Career high

=== Season-by-season averages ===
Year	Team	GP	MPG	FG%	3P%	FT%	RPG	APG	SPG	BPG	PPG
2006–07	Red Bull	14	11.1	.381	.217	**.708**	1.5	.4	.3	.0	3.9
2007–08	Red Bull	**19**	11.5	.422	.200	.333	1.3	.5	.2	.0	4.6
2008–09	Red Bull / Barako Bull	13	11.5	.341	.348	.500	1.8	.4	**.5**	.0	2.9
2009–10	Barako Bull	9	**15.2**	**.455**	**.450**	.500	**3.1**	**.6**	.1	.0	**5.6**
2011–12	Talk 'N Text	4	4.8	.400	.000	—	.8	.3	.0	.0	1.0
Career		59	11.5	.405	.282	.575	1.7	.5	.3	.0	3.9

Preceded by Derrick Hubalde	NCAA Juniors' Basketball Finals Most Valuable Player; 2000	Succeeded by Jeffrey Martin
