= M.C. Caceres =

Filipino basketball player

Lyceum Pirates
- Position: Assistant coach
- League: NCAA PH

Personal information
- Born: July 31, 1981 (age 45) Marikina, Philippines
- Listed height: 6 ft 5 in (1.96 m)
- Listed weight: 205 lb (93 kg)

Career information
- College: PSBA
- PBA draft: 2006: 2nd round, 14th overall pick
- Drafted by: Coca-Cola Tigers
- Playing career: 2006–2009, 2019–2020
- Coaching career: 2024–present

Career history

Playing
- 2006–2009: Coca-Cola Tigers
- 2019–2020: Imus Bandera

Coaching
- 2024–present: Lyceum (assistant)

Manuel Magistrado "M.C." Caceres (born July 31, 1981) is a former Filipino professional basketball player and collegiate coach. He was the fourteenth pick overall by the Coca-Cola Tigers in the 2006 PBA draft. He is currently one of the assistant coaches for the Lyceum Pirates (LPU) for the National Collegiate Athletic Association (Philippines) (NCAA).

== PBA career statistics ==
Legend
GP	Games played	MPG	Minutes per game
FG%	Field-goal percentage	3P%	3-point field-goal percentage	FT%	Free-throw percentage
RPG	Rebounds per game	APG	Assists per game	SPG	Steals per game
BPG	Blocks per game	PPG	Points per game	**Bold**	Career high

=== Season-by-season averages ===
Year	Team	GP	MPG	FG%	3P%	FT%	RPG	APG	SPG	BPG	PPG
2006–07	Coca-Cola	**13**	12.2	**.419**	.000	.357	2.5	.2	**.1**	.2	**4.4**
2007–08	Coca-Cola	6	**15.7**	.250	**.286**	**.500**	**2.8**	**.8**	.0	**.3**	3.0
2008–09	Coca-Cola	2	4.5	.000	.000	.000	1.0	.0	.0	.0	.0
Career		21	12.4	.363	.222	.389	2.4	.3	.1	.2	3.6
