= Billy Mamaril =

Filipino-American basketball player

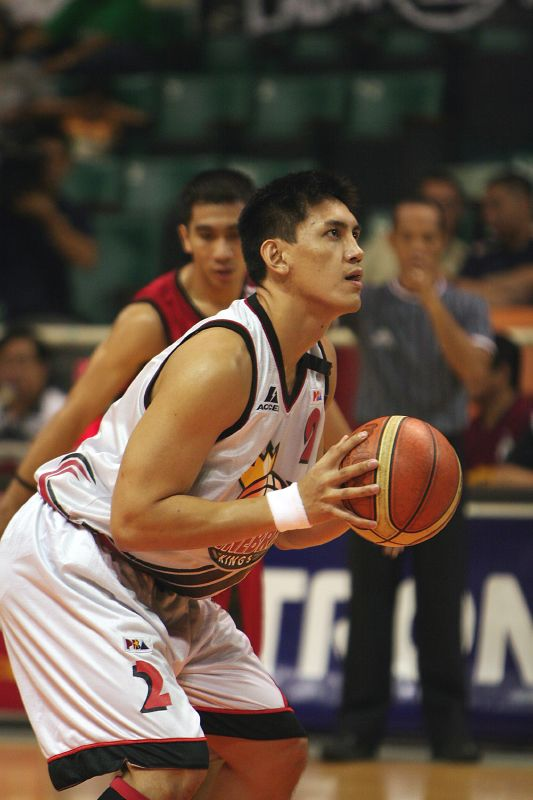
- Billy Mamaril in 2007

Personal information
- Born: June 25, 1980 (age 46) Bocaue, Bulacan, Philippines
- Listed height: 6 ft 6 in (1.98 m)
- Listed weight: 225 lb (102 kg)

Career information
- College: Bakersfield College
- PBA draft: 2003: 1st round, 6th overall pick
- Drafted by: Purefoods TJ Hotdogs
- Playing career: 2003–2020
- Position: Center / power forward

Career history
- 2002: Davao Eagles
- 2003–2004: Purefoods TJ Hotdogs
- 2004–2005: Shell Turbo Chargers
- 2005–2006: Coca-Cola Tigers
- 2006–2010: Barangay Ginebra Kings
- 2010: Air21 Express
- 2010–2015: Barangay Ginebra San Miguel
- 2015–2017: GlobalPort Batang Pier
- 2017–2020: San Miguel Beermen

Career highlights
- 5× PBA champion (2006–07 Philippine, 2008 Fiesta, 2017–18 Philippine, 2019 Philippine, 2019 Commissioner's); PBA All-Star (2005); PBA All-Defensive Team (2009)

John Billy San Luis Mamaril (born June 25, 1980) is a Filipino-American former professional basketball player. He plays the forward and center positions. Like his father, former PBA player and Barangay Ginebra Kings slotman, Romy "Mama" Mamaril, he is known for his physical and rugged defense. He played 17 seasons in the Philippine Basketball Association (PBA).

== Early life ==
Mamaril grew up in Bulacan as one of three children. When he was ten years old, his father Romy Mamaril became estranged from his wife. As a result, Billy and the rest of his family moved to the US while his father stayed in the country. Living in Delano, California, he played basketball with other Fil-Ams in the Filipino American Basketball Association (FABA).

Mamaril took up Liberal Arts at Bakersfield College and played for their basketball team. With his play in the FABA gaining attention, he decided to return to the Philippines and pursue a basketball career there. He started playing in the Philippines in 2001 in the semipro Philippine Basketball League (PBL), where he was one of the top two draft picks.

== Professional career ==
=== Davao Eagles ===
Mamaril had his first pro basketball experiences when he was recruited by the Davao Eagles of the Metropolitan Basketball Association (MBA) in 2002.

=== Purefoods TJ Hotdogs ===
Mamaril then applied for the 2003 PBA draft. Although he grew up in the US, since he was born in the Philippines and had a Filipino passport, he was eligible for the draft. He was selected sixth overall by the Purefoods TJ Hotdogs and signed to a three-year ₱7,500,000 deal.

As a rookie, he competed in the Slam Dunk Contest during the 2003 All-Star Weekend.

=== Shell Turbo Chargers ===
During the 2004 PBA draft, Mamaril was traded to the Shell Turbo Chargers for Eddie Laure and the seventh overall pick. During the 2004–05 season, he was among 20 Fil-foreign players suspended for not submitting all the required documents proving their Philippine citizenship. He was able to return in time to help the Turbochargers reach the semifinals of the 2005 Fiesta Conference. At the end of the season, Shell took a leave of absence from the league.

=== Coca-Cola Tigers ===
With Shell taking a leave of absence from the league, Mamaril was traded to the Coca-Cola Tigers for Gec Chia and Edwin Bacani in 2005. With several teams looking to trade for him, Coca-Cola signed him to a two-and-a-half-year extension worth ₱7.5 million. With Coca-Cola, he made his first All-Star appearance playing for the North team.

=== Barangay Ginebra Kings ===
In 2006, Mamaril became part of one of the most controversial trades in PBA history which also involved Rafi Reavis, Rudy Hatfield, Aris Dimaunahan, and Ervin Sotto, as sister teams Coca-Cola and the Barangay Ginebra Kings were not allowed to make trades with one another. Initially, the trade was denied, but eventually pushed through, with Mamaril and Hatfield heading to Ginebra. With the trade, Ginebra was seen as the team to beat.

In his debut with Ginebra, Mamaril scored 11 points in a win over the debuting Welcoat Dragons. With the addition of Johnny Abarrientos as a free agent and Ronald Tubid via another trade strengthening the team even more, Ginebra made the 2006–07 Philippine Cup finals, making this Mamaril's first time to play in the PBA finals. Ginebra went on to win the finals.

During a preseason game between Ginebra and the Magnolia Beverage Masters, Mamaril was punched repeatedly by Magnolia's Danny Seigle. Although both were pulled from the game, they were later able to finish the game and apologize to one another. Since Mamaril was only defending himself during the confrontation, he didn't have to pay a fine, while Seigle had to pay ₱10,000.

In a loss to Welcoat during the 2007–08 Philippine Cup, Mamaril led the team in scoring with 17 points. In the following conference, they reached the 2008 Fiesta Conference finals. Facing the Red Bull Barako, Ginebra won the finals, and Mamaril got his second title with Ginebra.

=== Air21 Express ===
On June 11, 2010, he was traded to the Air21 Express for Mike Cortez. In a win over Ginebra, he came up with a game-sealing block on Enrico Villanueva. He got to play eight games with the team, averaging six rebounds, five points and two assists.

=== Return to Barangay Ginebra ===
A month later, Mamaril was then returned to Ginebra for a future pick.

After playing three games at the start of the 2011–12 Philippine Cup, Mamaril had to step away from the team for a while as he had to tend to his wife, who had just suffered a seizure.

In Game 3 of the 2012–13 Philippine Cup quarterfinals against the Rain or Shine Elasto Painters, Mamaril stepped up with 20 points, 10 rebounds, and a career-high six blocks, but their season ended early. In the 2013 Commissioner's Cup finals, Ginebra was swept by the Alaska Aces.

=== GlobalPort Batang Pier ===
On April 6, 2015, Mamaril was traded by Ginebra to the GlobalPort Batang Pier for Dave Marcelo after Frankie Lim was hired by Barangay Ginebra as the team's head coach. Marcelo played college basketball for San Beda Red Lions, where he played under coach Lim. The trade was a part of a 4-team trade that also involved Ginebra's sister team, San Miguel, and Barako Bull.

In a loss to Alaska during the elimination round of the 2015–16 Philippine Cup, Mamaril scored 13 points. That conference, he helped GlobalPort make its first semifinals appearance after he sent their do-or-die match against Ginebra into overtime, in which his team was able to win. Facing Alaska once again in the semis, in Game 1, he contributed 12 points, seven rebounds, four assists, three steals, and a block while his teammate Terrence Romeo scored 41 points to get an upset win over the more experienced Alaska.

=== San Miguel Beermen ===
Mamaril then tried out for the San Miguel Beermen in 2017. He made the roster for the 2017–18 season. That season, the Beermen won the 2017–18 Philippine Cup. He then made a bigger impact during the Commissioner's Cup, stepping up when Christian Standhardinger went down with a swollen knee. The Beermen made the finals during that conference. In 2019, he won two more titles with the Beermen.

With June Mar Fajardo out due to a fractured right tibia and Yancy de Ocampo retiring, the Beermen brought him back for his 18th PBA season.

Mamaril was not offered a new contract after that season. In October 2022, it was reported that Mamaril had retired from professional basketball to pursue becoming a nurse.

== PBA career statistics ==
Legend
GP	Games played	MPG	Minutes per game
FG%	Field-goal percentage	3P%	3-point field-goal percentage	FT%	Free-throw percentage
RPG	Rebounds per game	APG	Assists per game	SPG	Steals per game
BPG	Blocks per game	PPG	Points per game	**Bold**	Career high

=== Season-by-season averages ===
Year	Team	GP	MPG	FG%	3P%	FT%	RPG	APG	SPG	BPG	PPG
2003	Purefoods	36	22.6	**.511**	.000	.525	4.8	.6	.4	.6	6.1
2004–05	Shell	**73**	**30.3**	.386	.000	.515	**6.0**	**1.8**	**.9**	**1.4**	**9.0**
2005–06	Coca-Cola	38	24.3	.363	.000	.576	5.1	1.0	.5	1.2	7.6
2006–07	Barangay Ginebra	52	16.2	.449	—	.586	3.6	.6	.2	.4	5.2
2007–08	Barangay Ginebra	48	20.3	.422	—	.625	4.0	.8	.3	.7	5.6
2008–09	Barangay Ginebra	41	18.3	.484	.000	.632	3.9	.5	.4	.7	6.4
2009–10	Barangay Ginebra	32	17.0	.479	—	.471	4.8	.7	.4	.6	5.3
2009–10	Air21	32	17.0	.479	—	.471	4.8	.7	.4	.6	5.3
2010–11	Barangay Ginebra	38	14.0	.444	.000	.444	3.1	.8	.4	.5	3.8
2011–12	Barangay Ginebra	31	13.3	.427	—	.565	3.2	.7	.5	.3	2.9
2012–13	Barangay Ginebra	46	17.7	.467	—	.549	4.4	.5	.5	.6	5.5
2013–14	Barangay Ginebra	34	9.6	.385	—	.531	1.9	.4	.1	.2	2.3
2014–15	Barangay Ginebra	32	15.8	.433	.000	.488	3.8	.8	.2	1.0	4.1
2014–15	GlobalPort	32	15.8	.433	.000	.488	3.8	.8	.2	1.0	4.1
2015–16	GlobalPort	38	19.0	.470	.000	**.667**	4.2	1.1	.6	.8	5.1
2016–17	GlobalPort	34	15.7	.343	—	.429	2.8	.6	.4	.5	2.5
2017–18	San Miguel	25	4.7	.440	—	.571	.8	.2	.0	.1	1.0
2019	San Miguel	10	4.1	.143	—	—	.6	.1	.0	.2	.2
2020	San Miguel	10	9.3	.222	—	.671	2.3	.1	.0	.4	1.6
Career		618	18.1	.424	.000	.553	3.9	.8	.4	.7	5.1

== National team career ==
In 2002, Mamaril and a selection of MBA All-Stars represented the Philippines in the Jones Cup. They finished that tournament fifth out of eight teams.

In 2005, Mamaril was named to the Philippine team that competed in the Brunei Cup since the Philippines was banned from FIBA competitions at the time. He also played in a tournament in Qatar and made a return to the Jones Cup with the Philippine team in 2006.

== Personal life ==
Billy is the son of former PBA player Romy "Mama" Mamaril, who played for five teams from 1980 to 1991.

His first wife, Christine Bayer-Mamaril, died on July 20, 2018, due to a recurring illness. She first experienced a seizure in 2011. They had two daughters together, Audrey and Sophia. Audrey then died at the age of 15 in 2024.

Mamaril is now a registered nurse. He first thought of becoming a dietician before following in his mother's footsteps and becoming a nurse. He studied nursing during his last seasons with San Miguel, and even did first aid Fajardo when he injured his leg. After finishing nursing school at Our Lady of Fatima University – Antipolo, he took the nursing board exam in 2022, and passed.
