= JJ Sullinger =

American basketball player (born 1982)

Personal information
- Born: October 5, 1982 (age 44) Columbus, Ohio, U.S.
- Listed height: 6 ft 6 in (1.98 m)
- Listed weight: 196 lb (89 kg)

Career information
- High school: Thomas Worthington High School
- College: Ohio State
- NBA draft: 2006: undrafted
- Playing career: 2006–2010
- Position: Small forward
- Number: 0

Career history
- 2006–2007: Indiana Alley Cats
- 2007: Talk 'N Text Phone Pals
- 2007: Śląsk Wrocław
- 2008: Leuven Bears
- 2008: Guindas de Nogales
- 2008: Panthers Fürstenfeld
- 2008–2009: Albany Patroons
- 2009: Coca-Cola Tigers
- 2010: Guindas de Nogales
- 2010: Heilongjiang Sky Lions

James Todd Sullinger Jr. (October 5, 1982) is a former American professional basketball player.

== Playing career ==
=== College ===
Sullinger played college ball for Ohio State Buckeyes.

=== Professional ===
==== CBA ====
Sullinger first played for Indiana Alley Cats.

==== First PBA stint ====
He played as an import for Talk 'N Text Phone Pals, and brought the team into the 2007 Fiesta Conference finals, but lost to Alaska Aces in seven games. In the seventh game, Sullinger missed a three-point shot that can send the game into overtime.

==== Europe ====
He played for teams like Śląsk Wrocław, Leuven Bears, and Panthers Fürstenfeld.

==== Return to PBA ====
He returned to the Philippines, this time playing for Coca-Cola Tigers for the 2009 Fiesta Conference. In his time with the Tigers, he was fined P20,000 by Commissioner's Office due to a flagrant foul penalty two on then-Barako Bull player Jeff Chan.
