= Aris Dimaunahan =

Filipino basketball player and coach

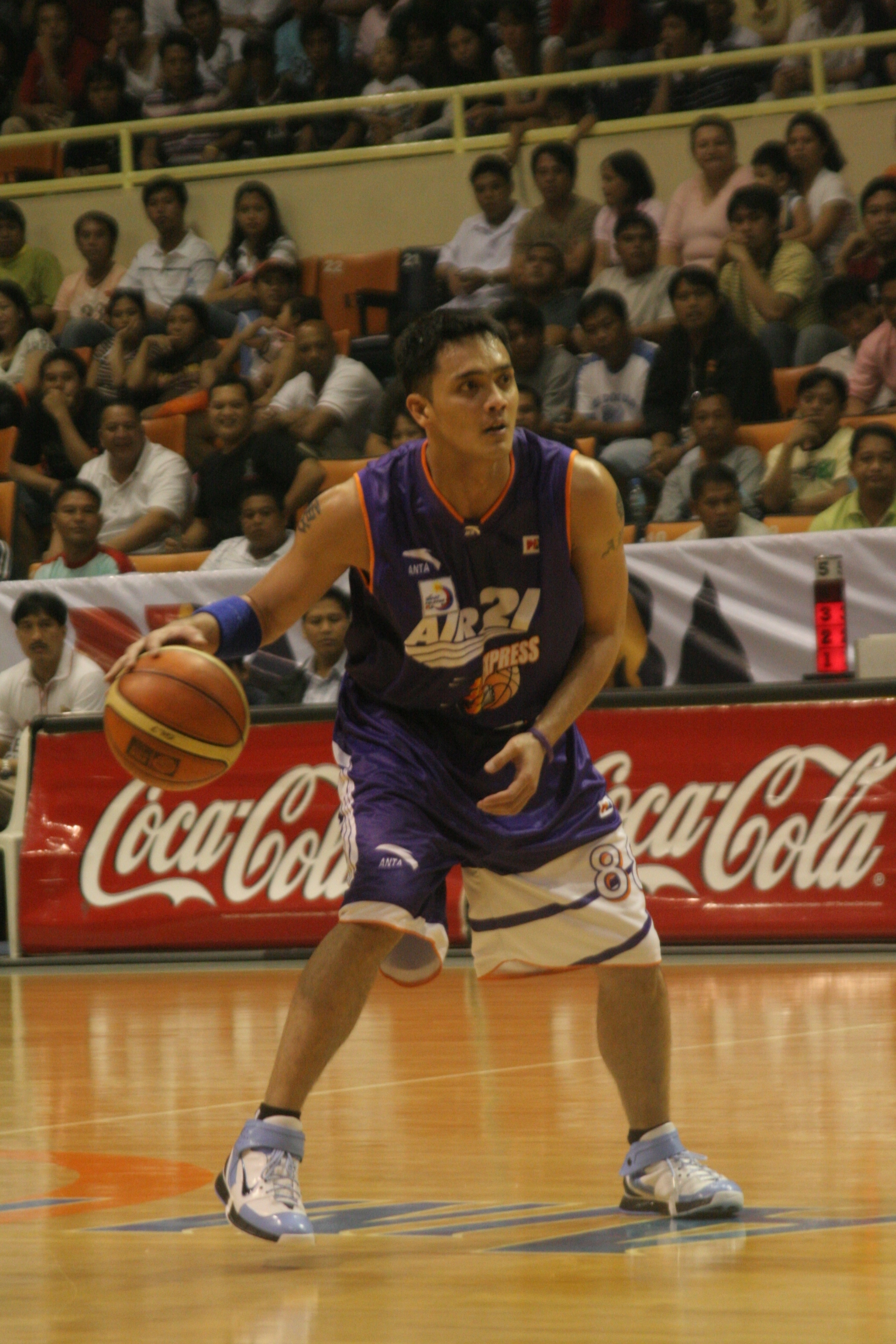
- Dimaunahan in 2007

Blackwater Bossing
- Title: Assistant coach
- League: PBA

Personal information
- Born: March 21, 1978 (age 48) Lipa, Batangas, Philippines
- Listed height: 6 ft 0 in (1.83 m)
- Listed weight: 185 lb (84 kg)

Career information
- High school: De La Salle Lipa (Lipa, Batangas)
- College: UST
- PBA draft: 2002: 3rd round, 26th overall pick
- Drafted by: Barangay Ginebra Kings
- Playing career: 2003–2013
- Position: Shooting guard
- Coaching career: 2014–present

Career history

Playing
- 2003–2006: Barangay Ginebra Kings
- 2006–2008: Air21 Express
- 2008–2009: Coca-Cola Tigers
- 2009–2011: Barako Bull Energy Boosters
- 2011: Alaska Aces
- 2011–2013: San Miguel Beermen (ABL)

Coaching
- 2014–2019: Blackwater Elite (assistant)
- 2015: Philippines women
- 2017–2022: NU (women) (assistant)
- 2019: Blackwater Elite (interim)
- 2019–present: Blackwater Elite / Bossing (assistant)
- 2022–2025: NU (women)

Career highlights
- As a player: 2× PBA champion (2004 Fiesta, 2004–05 Philippine); PBA 2-Ball Challenge Co-Champion (2003); As a coach: UAAP women's champion (2022, 2024)

Aristeo Dimaunahan (born March 21, 1978) is a Filipino former professional basketball player who is the assistant coach of the Blackwater Bossing in the Philippine Basketball Association (PBA).

== Early life and career ==
He attended Grace Kindergarten, Canossa Academy and graduated from De La Salle-Lipa in 1994. He also attended the University of Santo Tomas after high school.

== Playing career ==
He played in the Philippine Basketball League in his early years before being drafted by the Barangay Ginebra Kings in the 2002 PBA draft. He was also recognized by then-Mayor Vilma Santos as the second PBA player from his hometown in Lipa City after Melchor Teves, who also graduated from De La Salle Lipa.

In 2006, Dimaunahan was also part of a controversial PBA seven player trade involving Rudy Hatfield, Billy Mamaril, Rafi Reavis, and Ervin Sotto. Because sister teams such as Ginebra and Coca-Cola are not allowed to trade directly, nor can their under-teams, which applied to San Miguel Beer and Purefoods. In order to circumvent the rules, a third team, Air21 was involved in the trade, which ultimately sent Dimaunahan to Air21.

After playing two seasons with the Barako Bull Energy Boosters, he was signed by the Alaska Aces as a free agent during the 2011 Governors Cup. In 2012, while with the San Miguel Beermen, he was one of five players suspended for taking place in a Basket-Brawl involving the Beermen and the entire bench of the AirAsia Philippine Patriots.

== Coaching career ==
After retiring as a player, Dimaunahan began a coaching career, with stints both professionally and in women's college basketball. In 2015 he served as an assistant coach with the Blackwater Elite, and in 2017 he became an assistant coach for the Lady Bulldogs. In 2015, Dimanauhan was an assistant coach for Patrick Aquino and the Philippines women's national basketball team.

In 2022, after Aquino decided to focus on the women's national team, Dimaunahan was promoted as NU's head coach. Later that year, he led the Lady Bulldogs to their seventh consecutive UAAP title. The streak would end in Season 86.

== PBA career statistics ==
Legend
GP	Games played	MPG	Minutes per game
FG%	Field-goal percentage	3P%	3-point field-goal percentage	FT%	Free-throw percentage
RPG	Rebounds per game	APG	Assists per game	SPG	Steals per game
BPG	Blocks per game	PPG	Points per game	**Bold**	Career high

=== Season-by-season averages ===
Year	Team	GP	MPG	FG%	3P%	FT%	RPG	APG	SPG	BPG	PPG
2003	Barangay Ginebra	40	16.8	**.415**	.292	.739	1.9	2.0	.7	**.1**	4.6
2004–05	Barangay Ginebra	**66**	18.1	.396	.253	.810	1.9	**2.8**	.3	.0	3.1
2005–06	Barangay Ginebra	19	13.7	.226	.250	**.857**	1.5	1.6	.2	.0	2.4
2006–07	Air21	44	15.8	.373	.295	.744	1.8	2.1	.7	.0	5.6
2007–08	Air21	39	13.4	.346	.310	.794	1.7	1.9	.5	**.1**	3.7
2007–08	Coca-Cola	39	13.4	.346	.310	.794	1.7	1.9	.5	**.1**	3.7
2008–09	Coca-Cola	31	10.4	.372	.283	.500	1.3	1.4	.5	.0	2.4
2009–10	Barako Bull / Barako Energy Coffee	36	**22.0**	.393	**.331**	.741	**3.0**	2.7	**.9**	.0	**7.2**
2010–11	Barako Bull	16	12.2	.316	.258	.800	1.5	1.4	.2	**.1**	2.9
2010–11	Alaska	16	12.2	.316	.258	.800	1.5	1.4	.2	**.1**	2.9
Career		291	16.0	.373	.295	.767	1.9	2.1	.5	.0	4.1

== Coaching record ==
Season	Team	Elimination round					Playoffs				
Season	Team	Finish	GP	W	L	PCT	GP	W	L	PCT	Results
2022	NU	1st/8	14	13	1	.929	3	3	0	1.000	Champion
2023	NU	1st/8	14	13	1	.929	4	2	2	.500	Finals
2024	NU	1st/8	14	14	0	1.000	3	2	1	.667	Champion
Totals			84	82	2	.976	10	7	3	.700	2× champion

== Personal life ==
Dimaunahan is married to former child actress Jane Zaleta, where he has two children.
