= 2006–07 Barangay Ginebra Kings season =

- Head coach: Jong Uichico
- General Manager: Samboy Lim
- Owner(s): Ginebra San Miguel, Inc.

Philippine Cup results
- Record: 21–9 (70%)
- Place: 1st
- Playoff finish: Finals (def.SMB,4–2)

Fiesta Conference results
- Record: 13–9 (59.1%)
- Place: 5th
- Playoff finish: Quarterfinals

Barangay Ginebra Kings seasons

The 2006–07 Barangay Ginebra Kings season was the 28th season of the franchise in the Philippine Basketball Association (PBA).

== Key dates ==
August 20: The 2006 PBA Draft took place in Fort Bonifacio, Taguig.

== Occurrences ==
San Miguel Beermen general manager Samboy Lim was appointed as Ginebra's manager replacing Allan Caidic. Caidic who was assigned to Coca-Cola Tigers, but eventually returned to Ginebra after being replaced by JB Bailon.

== Philippine Cup awards ==
- Best Player of the Conference: Mark Caguioa
- Finals Most Valuable Player: Jayjay Helterbrand

== Roster ==
2006–07 Barangay Ginebra Kings roster
Players
Coaches

Pos.	#	POB	Name	Height	Weight	DOB (YYYY–MM–DD)	From
C	2	(Philippines)	Billy Mamaril	6 ft 6 in (1.98 m)	220 lb (100 kg)		Bakersfield
G	3	(Philippines)	Paolo Hubalde	5 ft 11 in (1.80 m)	165 lb (75 kg)		UE
C	4	(United States)	Rafi Reavis	6 ft 8 in (2.03 m)	210 lb (95 kg)		Coppin State
F	9	(Philippines)	Rodney Santos	6 ft 2 in (1.88 m)	175 lb (79 kg)		San Sebastian
G	12	(Philippines)	Edgar Echavez	5 ft 9 in (1.75 m)	150 lb (68 kg)
G	13	(Philippines)	Jayjay Helterbrand	5 ft 11 in (1.80 m)	170 lb (77 kg)		Kentucky State
G	14	(Philippines)	Johnny Abarrientos	5 ft 8 in (1.73 m)	150 lb (68 kg)		Far Eastern
G	18	(Philippines)	Mark Macapagal	6 ft 2 in (1.88 m)	185 lb (84 kg)		San Sebastian
C	30	(United States)	Eric Menk	6 ft 6 in (1.98 m)	220 lb (100 kg)		Lake Superior State
F/C	45	(United States)	Michael Holper	6 ft 6 in (1.98 m)	210 lb (95 kg)		San Diego State
G	47	(Philippines)	Mark Caguioa	6 ft 1 in (1.85 m)	185 lb (84 kg)		Glendale CC (CA)
C	52	(United States)	Andy Seigle	6 ft 10 in (2.08 m)	235 lb (107 kg)		New Orleans
G	71	(Philippines)	Ronald Tubid	6 ft 1 in (1.85 m)	175 lb (79 kg)		UE
G	80	(Philippines)	Sunday Salvacion	6 ft 3 in (1.91 m)	190 lb (86 kg)		St. Benilde
F	99	(United States)	Rudy Hatfield	6 ft 3 in (1.91 m)	200 lb (91 kg)		UM–Dearborn
F	34	(United States)	Rod Nealy (I)	6 ft 6 in (1.98 m)	210 lb (95 kg)		Houston Baptist

Head coach

- (Philippines) Jong Uichico (De La Salle)

Assistant coach(es)

- (Philippines) Art dela Cruz (San Sebastian)
- (Philippines) Siot Tanquingcen (UST)
- (Philippines) Juno Sauler (De La Salle)

Team manager

- (Philippines) Samboy Lim (Letran)

Legend

- (C) Team captain
- (CI) Commissioner's Cup Import
- (GI) Governors' Cup Import
- (EI) EASL Import
- (DP) Unsigned draft pick
- (FA) Free agent
- (IN) Inactive
- (S) Suspended
- (R) Rookie
- (I) Import
- Injured

== Philippine Cup ==
=== Game log ===
2006–07 PBA Philippine Cup game log
October

Game	Date	Opponent	Score	High points	High rebounds	High assists	Location Attendance	Record
1	October 1	Welcoat	102–69	Caguioa (23)			Araneta Coliseum	1–0
2	October 7	Purefoods	86–67				Dumaguete	2–0
3	October 11	Air21	114–113	Menk (27)			Araneta Coliseum	3–0
4	October 15	Red Bull	79–84	Caguioa (25)			Araneta Coliseum	3–1
5	October 22	San Miguel	97–101	Caguioa (20)			Cuneta Astrodome	3–2
6	October 26	Coca Cola	102–75	Salvacion (22)			Cabagan, Isabela	4–2
7	October 29	Alaska	98–91	Macapagal (28)			Araneta Coliseum	5–2

November

Game	Date	Opponent	Score	High points	High rebounds	High assists	Location Attendance	Record
8	November 5	Purefoods	84–88				Araneta Coliseum	5–3
9	November 10	San Miguel	92–87	Caguioa (28)			Araneta Coliseum	6–3
10	November 12	Talk 'N Text	98–113	Menk (29)			Araneta Coliseum	6–4
11	November 18	Sta.Lucia	123–117	Caguioa (32)			Puerto Princesa	7–4
12	November 24	Coca Cola	84–78	Caguioa (23)			Cuneta Astrodome	8–4
13	November 29	Welcoat	87–66	Hatfield (24)			Araneta Coliseum	9–4

December

Game	Date	Opponent	Score	High points	High rebounds	High assists	Location Attendance	Record
14	December 3	Air 21	116–105	Caguioa (35)			Araneta Coliseum	10–4
15	December 9	Alaska	108–101	Hatfield (24)			Lucena City	11–4
16	December 15	Sta.Lucia	109–89				Ynares Center	12–4
17	December 20	Red Bull	94–84	Hatfield (25)			Araneta Coliseum	13–4
18	December 25	Talk 'N Text	104–115	Helterbrand (29)			Araneta Coliseum	13–5

2006–07 schedule

== Fiesta Conference ==
=== Game log ===
2007 PBA Fiesta Conference game log
March

Game	Date	Opponent	Score	High points	High rebounds	High assists	Location Attendance	Record
1	March 11	Alaska	98–100	Nealy (31)			Araneta Coliseum	0–1
2	March 16	Welcoat	99–97	Nealy (26)			Araneta Coliseum	1–1
3	March 18	Red Bull	111–105	Nealy (21)			Araneta Coliseum	2–1
4	March 22	Coca Cola	101–97	Nealy (26)			The Arena in San Juan	3–1
5	March 25	San Miguel	102–84	Nealy (43)			Araneta Coliseum	4–1
6	March 30	Talk 'N Text	92–99	Nealy (34)			Araneta Coliseum	4–2

April

Game	Date	Opponent	Score	High points	High rebounds	High assists	Location Attendance	Record
7	April 1	Sta.Lucia	112–101	Nealy (37)			Araneta Coliseum	5–2
8	April 8	Red Bull	100–84	Nealy (38)	Nealy (16)		Araneta Coliseum	6–2
9	April 13	Purefoods	92–82				Al Ahli Sports Club (Dubai)	7–2
10	April 20	Coca Cola	105–93	Nealy (32)	Nealy (12)	Nealy (11)	Araneta Coliseum	8–2

May

Game	Date	Opponent	Score	High points	High rebounds	High assists	Location Attendance	Record
11	May 2	Welcoat	103–71	Nealy (38)			Araneta Coliseum	9–2
12	May 5	Air21	136–115				Angeles City	10–2
13	May 11	Alaska	91–97	Nealy (25) Salvacion (25)			Ynares Center	10–3
14	May 13	Purefoods	105–117	Nealy (32) Tubid (30)			Araneta Coliseum	10–4
15	May 19	Talk 'N Text	96–102				Butuan	10–5
16	May 25	Sta.Lucia	88–84	Nealy (38)			Ynares Center	11–5
17	May 27	San Miguel	98–101	Tubid (24)			Araneta Coliseum	11–6

June

Game	Date	Opponent	Score	High points	High rebounds	High assists	Location Attendance	Record
18	June 3	Air21	121–116	Nealy (35) Tubid (30)	Nealy (12) Tubid (12)	Nealy (5)	Araneta Coliseum	12–6

2006–07 schedule

== Transactions ==
=== Trades ===
Traded	to	For
2007 & 2008 2nd round pick/2009 1st round	Air 21 Express	Ronald Tubid
Rommel Adducul	Three-team trade	Paolo Hubalde

Traded	from	For
Kalani Ferreria, Ervin Sotto, Aries Dimaunahan	Three-team trade	Billy Mamaril, Rudy Hatfield, Rafi Reavis

=== Additions ===
Player	Signed	Former team
Gec Chia	March 2007	
