= Ervin Sotto =

Filipino basketball player & coach (born 1981)

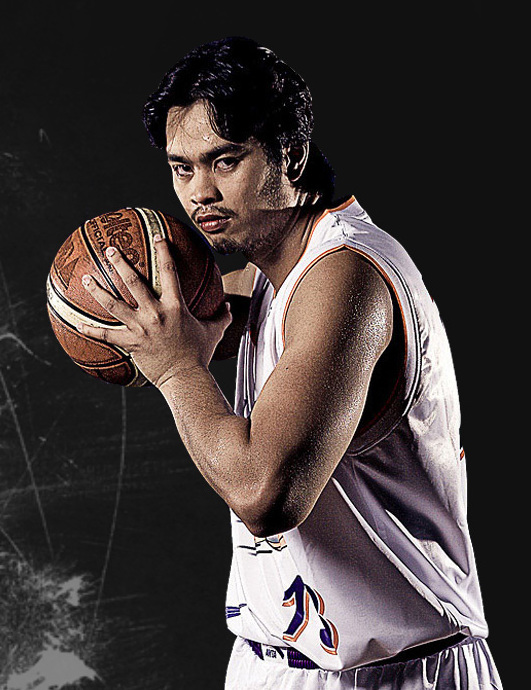
- Sotto with Air21 in 2007

Personal information
- Born: July 30, 1981 (age 45) Las Piñas, Philippines
- Listed height: 6 ft 7 in (2.01 m)
- Listed weight: 210 lb (95 kg)

Career information
- College: St. Francis
- PBA draft: 2004: 1st round, 7th overall pick
- Drafted by: Purefoods Tender Juicy Hotdogs
- Playing career: 2004–2016
- Position: Center
- Number: 30, 36, 13, 21
- Coaching career: 2018–2019

Career history

Playing
- 2004–2005: Purefoods Tender Juicy Hotdogs
- 2005: Shell Turbo Chargers
- 2005–2006: Barangay Ginebra Kings
- 2006–2008: Air21 Express
- 2008–2012: Alaska Aces
- 2012: Petron Blaze Boosters
- 2016: Byaheng SCTEX

Coaching
- 2018–2019: NLEX Road Warriors (assistant)

Career highlights
- PBA champion (2010 Fiesta)

Ervin Amedo Sotto (born July 30, 1981) is a Filipino former professional basketball player. He was also an assistant coach for the NLEX Road Warriors. He was the seventh overall pick in the 2004 PBA draft by the Purefoods Tender Juicy Hotdogs. He also played for the Shell Turbo Chargers, Barangay Ginebra Kings and the Air21 Express, Alaska Aces before joining NLEX Road Warriors camp. Sotto was one of the most promising big men and was known for his good shooting from outside the arc. He was included in one of the most controversial trades in the PBA involving Rudy Hatfield, Billy Mamaril, Rafi Reavis, and Aries Dimaunahan.

== Professional career ==
Before the 2004 PBA draft, Sotto played for Saint Francis of Assisi College System along with his twin tower center-forward Ranidel de Ocampo to which they grab championships in a collegiate league NCRAA. Sotto was a highly heralded prospect mainly because of his size and was projected by some to be the first pick of that year's draft. Eventually, he was picked seventh overall by Purefoods Tender Juicy Giants. Coming out of the Philippine Basketball League he once acquired the Most Improved Player and Mythical Five selection from a well known team Welcoat Housepaint.

In 2005, Sotto was traded to Shell Turbo Chargers for Mike Hrabak. In December 2005, his contract with Shell expired and was not renewed, making him a free agent.

In December 2005, Barangay Ginebra Kings signed him after his contract with Sta. Lucia expired.

In July 2006, Sotto was traded by Barangay Ginebra to Air21 Express in a controversial three-team trade that also involved Coca-Cola Tigers. In the end of the 2007–08 PBA season, Sotto was released by the Express.

In September 2008, just after he was released by Air21, the Alaska Aces picked him up.

On 2012, Sotto was signed by the Petron Blaze Boosters. However, after just four games with the team, he was released.

In March 2016, Sotto was signed by Byaheng SCTEX of the Pilipinas Commercial Basketball League.

== National team career ==
Sotto represented the Philippines national basketball team at the 2003 Southeast Asian Games in Vietnam where he won the gold medal.

== Personal life ==
Sotto is married to Pamela Sotto (née Perlado) and has three children, including his eldest son, Kai, who last played for the Koshigaya Alphas of the Japanese B.League.

== PBA career statistics ==
Legend
GP	Games played	MPG	Minutes per game
FG%	Field-goal percentage	3P%	3-point field-goal percentage	FT%	Free-throw percentage
RPG	Rebounds per game	APG	Assists per game	SPG	Steals per game
BPG	Blocks per game	PPG	Points per game	**Bold**	Career high

=== Season-by-season averages ===
Year	Team	GP	MPG	FG%	3P%	FT%	RPG	APG	SPG	BPG	PPG
2004–05	Shell	33	6.7	.299	.211	.625	1.3	.2	**.1**	.2	1.7
2005–06	Purefoods / Barangay Ginebra	33	**8.1**	.448	.000	.697	1.8	.2	.0	**.4**	**3.3**
2006–07	Air21	29	7.6	.426	.000	.722	**1.9**	**.5**	**.1**	.1	2.2
2007–08	Air21	**42**	6.9	.390	**.231**	.600	1.2	.2	.0	.1	1.6
2008–09	Alaska	13	5.3	.562	.000	**1.000**	1.1	.1	.0	.0	1.5
2010–11	Alaska	2	2.0	**1.000**	.000	.500	1.0	.0	.0	.0	3.0
2011–12	Petron Blaze	4	3.5	.571	.000	.000	1.0	.0	.0	.3	2.0
Career		156	7.0	.408	.189	.681	1.5	.2	.0	.2	2.1
