= 2006–07 San Miguel Beermen season =

- Head coach: Chot Reyes
- General Manager: Hector Calma
- Owner(s): San Miguel Corporation

Philippine Cup results
- Record: 19–12 (61.3%)
- Place: 2nd
- Playoff finish: Finals (lost to Brgy.Ginebra)

Fiesta Conference results
- Record: 16–14 (53.3%)
- Place: 4th
- Playoff finish: Semifinals (lost to Alaska)

San Miguel Beermen seasons

The 2006–07 San Miguel Beermen season was the 32nd season of the franchise in the Philippine Basketball Association (PBA).

== Key dates ==
August 20: The 2006 PBA Draft took place in Fort Bonifacio, Taguig.

== Draft picks ==
Round	Pick	Player	Height	Position	Nationality	College
1	4	LA Tenorio	5'9"	Guard	Philippines	Ateneo
1	5	Gabby Espinas	6'4"	Forward	Philippines	PCU

== Roster ==
2006–07 San Miguel Beermen roster
Players

Pos.	#	POB	Name	Height	Weight	DOB (YYYY–MM–DD)	From
F	2	(Philippines)	Gabby Espinas	6 ft 4 in (1.93 m)			Philippine Christian
C	4	(United States)	Dorian Peña	6 ft 6 in (1.98 m)			Coppin State
G	5	(United States)	Brandon Cablay	6 ft 0 in (1.83 m)			Vanguard
G	6	(Philippines)	LA Tenorio	5 ft 9 in (1.75 m)			Ateneo
G	7	(Philippines)	Dondon Hontiveros	6 ft 2 in (1.88 m)			Cebu
F/C	10	(Philippines)	Danny Ildefonso	6 ft 6 in (1.98 m)			National-U
G	11	(Philippines)	Francis Adriano	6 ft 0 in (1.83 m)			Far Eastern
F	15	(Philippines)	Wesley Gonzales	6 ft 4 in (1.93 m)			Ateneo
G	17	(Philippines)	Olsen Racela	5 ft 10 in (1.78 m)			Ateneo
F	27	(United States)	Willie Wilson	6 ft 3 in (1.91 m)			De La Salle
G/F	30	(Philippines)	Lordy Tugade	6 ft 3 in (1.91 m)			National-U
F	42	(United States)	Danny Seigle	6 ft 6 in (1.98 m)			Wagner
F/C	77	(Philippines)	Enrico Villanueva	6 ft 5 in (1.96 m)			Ateneo
G	88	(Philippines)	Chris Calaguio	6 ft 2 in (1.88 m)			Letran
F	1	(United States)	Vidal Massiah (I)	6 ft 6 in (1.98 m)			St. Bonaventure
F	34	(United States)	Paul McMillan (I)	6 ft 6 in (1.98 m)			Loyola Chicago
F	1	(United States)	Galen Young (I)	6 ft 6 in (1.98 m)			Charlotte

Coaches
Head coach
- (Philippines) Chot Reyes
Assistant(s)
- (Philippines) Pido Jarencio
- (Philippines) Aboy Castro
- (Philippines) Biboy Ravanes
- (Philippines) Nash Racela
- (Philippines) Eric Altamirano

Legend
- (DP) Unsigned draft pick
- (FA) Free agent
- (S) Suspended
- (I) Import
- Injured

== Philippine Cup ==
=== Game log ===
2006–07 PBA Philippine Cup game log
October

Game	Date	Opponent	Score	High points	High rebounds	High assists	Location Attendance	Record
1	October 6	Red Bull					Araneta Coliseum	0–1
2	October 11	Sta.Lucia	95–98	Calaguio (22)			Araneta Coliseum	0–2
3	October 15	Welcoat	88–96	Calaguio (17)			Araneta Coliseum	0–3
4	October 20	Alaska	81–71	Seigle (25)			Ynares Center	1–3
5	October 22	Brgy.Ginebra	101–97	Seigle (28)			Cuneta Astrodome	2–3
6	October 28	Air21	118–102	Gonzales (18)			Subic, Zambales	3–3

November

Game	Date	Opponent	Score	High points	High rebounds	High assists	Location Attendance	Record
7	November 3	Purefoods	87–79	Seigle (24)			Araneta Coliseum	4–3
8	November 8	Coca Cola	119–103	Seigle (28)			Araneta Coliseum	5–3
9	November 10	Brgy.Ginebra	87–92				Araneta Coliseum	5–4
10	November 15	Red Bull	84–78				Araneta Coliseum	6–4
11	November 19	Talk 'N Text	84–90	Hontiveros (14)			Araneta Coliseum	6–5
12	November 25	Purefoods	100–81	Seigle (24)			Olivarez Gym	7–5
13	November 29	Sta.Lucia	113–98	Seigle (33)			Araneta Coliseum	8–5

December

Game	Date	Opponent	Score	High points	High rebounds	High assists	Location Attendance	Record
14	December 2	Alaska	103–99	Tugade (20)			General Santos	9–5
15	December 9	Coca Cola	108–91	Seigle (19)			Lucena City	10–5
16	December 13	Welcoat	97–85	Seigle (28)			Araneta Coliseum	11–5
17	December 17	Talk 'N Text	114–102	Seigle (26)			Araneta Coliseum	12–5
18	December 25	Air21	108–104	Tugade (19)			Araneta Coliseum	13–5

2006–07 schedule

== Fiesta Conference ==
=== Game log ===
2007 PBA Fiesta Conference game log
March

Game	Date	Opponent	Score	High points	High rebounds	High assists	Location Attendance	Record
1	March 9	Red Bull	84–102	Peña (17)			Cuneta Astrodome	0–1
2	March 14	Air21	78–88	Cablay (17)			Araneta Coliseum	0–2
3	March 17	Coca Cola	64–82	Millan (11) Calaguio (11)			Lanao del Norte	0–3
4	March 21	Purefoods	77–79	McMillan (27)			Araneta Coliseum	0–4
5	March 25	Brgy.Ginebra	84–102	McMillan (41)			Araneta Coliseum	0–5
6	March 29	Sta.Lucia	90–95	McMillan (31)			Muntinlupa	0–6

April

Game	Date	Opponent	Score	High points	High rebounds	High assists	Location Attendance	Record
7	April 4	Talk 'N Text	108–103	McMillan (41)			Araneta Coliseum	1–6
8	April 11	Alaska	84–94	Tenorio (13)			Araneta Coliseum	1–7
9	April 15	Welcoat	96–90	Young (19)			Araneta Coliseum	2–7
10	April 21	Sta.Lucia	78–61				Tacloban, Leyte	3–7
11	April 24	Alaska	100–96				Cuneta Astrodome	4–7

May

Game	Date	Opponent	Score	High points	High rebounds	High assists	Location Attendance	Record
12	May 6	Purefoods	78–75	Young (14) Racela (14)			Araneta Coliseum	5–7
13	May 12	Red Bull	98–93	Ildefonso (20)			Cebu City	6–7
14	May 17	Coca Cola	84–71	Wilson (16) Peña (16)			The Arena in San Juan	7–7
15	May 23	Welcoat	119–79	Ildefonso (20)			Ynares Center	8–7
16	May 27	Brgy.Ginebra	101–98	Peña (22)			Araneta Coliseum	9–7
17	May 30	Air21	107–109	Ildefonso (30)			Araneta Coliseum	9–8

June

Game	Date	Opponent	Score	High points	High rebounds	High assists	Location Attendance	Record
18	June 3	Talk 'N Text	105–99	Young (26)	Young (15)		Araneta Coliseum	10–8

2006–07 schedule

== Transactions ==
=== Trades ===
Traded	to	For
Migs Noble, Mark Kong	Red Bull (3-team trade)	Rommel Adducul, Lordy Tugade

=== Subtractions ===
Player	Signed	New team
Paolo Hubalde	October, 2006	Brgy. Ginebra ^{(Part of 3-team trade)}
