= 2006–07 Alaska Aces season =

- Head coach: Tim Cone
- General Manager: Joaqui Trillo
- Owner(s): Fred Uytengsu

Philippine Cup results
- Record: 9–12 (42.9%)
- Place: 8th
- Playoff finish: Wildcard

Fiesta Conference results
- Record: 21–11 (65.6%)
- Place: 1st
- Playoff finish: Champions (def. Talk 'N Text, 4–3)

Alaska Aces seasons

The 2006–07 Alaska Aces season was the 21st season of the franchise in the Philippine Basketball Association (PBA).

== Key dates ==
August 20: The 2006 PBA Draft took place in Fort Bonifacio, Taguig.

== Draft picks ==
Round	Pick	Player	Height	Position	Nationality	College
1	7	Aaron Aban	6"3'	Guard-Forward	Philippines	Letran
2	18	Christian Luanzon	6"4'	Guard	Philippines	UST

== Award ==
Willie Miller won his second Most Valuable Player (MVP) award.

== Roster ==
2006–07 Alaska Aces roster
Players

Pos.	#	POB	Name	Height	Weight	DOB (YYYY–MM–DD)	From
G	1	(Philippines)	Mike Cortez	5 ft 11 in (1.80 m)			De La Salle
F	3	(United States)	Nic Belasco	6 ft 6 in (1.98 m)			Notre Dame (MD)
G	5	(Philippines)	Rensy Bajar	5 ft 10 in (1.78 m)			San Beda
C	7	(Papua New Guinea)	Sonny Thoss	6 ft 8 in (2.03 m)			James Cook
G	9	(Philippines)	Christian Luanzon	6 ft 4 in (1.93 m)			UST
F	11	(Philippines)	Eddie Laure	6 ft 3 in (1.91 m)			Adamson
G	13	(Philippines)	Willie Miller	5 ft 11 in (1.80 m)			Letran
G/F	17	(Philippines)	Aaron Aban	6 ft 3 in (1.91 m)			Letran
F	21	(Philippines)	Reynel Hugnatan	6 ft 5 in (1.96 m)			Manila
G	22	(United States)	Jeffrey Cariaso	6 ft 2 in (1.88 m)			Sonoma State
C	32	(Philippines)	Poch Juinio	6 ft 5 in (1.96 m)			Philippines
F	35	(United States)	Tony dela Cruz	6 ft 4 in (1.93 m)			UC Irvine
G	50	(Philippines)	Dale Singson	6 ft 0 in (1.83 m)			UST
F	55	(Philippines)	John Ferriols	6 ft 4 in (1.93 m)			USJ–R
F	75	(United States)	Rosell Ellis (I)	6 ft 3 in (1.91 m)			McNeese State

Coaches
Head coach
- (United States) Tim Cone
Assistant(s)
- (Philippines) Joel Banal
- (Philippines) Richard Bachmann
- (Philippines) Jojo Lastimosa
- (Philippines) Luigi Trillo

Legend
- (DP) Unsigned draft pick
- (FA) Free agent
- (S) Suspended
- (I) Import
- Injured

== Philippine Cup ==
=== Game log ===
2007 PBA Philippine Cup game log
October

Game	Date	Opponent	Score	High points	High rebounds	High assists	Location Attendance	Record
1	September 28*	Red Bull	93–99	Miller (23)			Guam	0–1
2	October 4	Coca Cola	99–84	Miller (26)			Araneta Coliseum	1–1
3	October 8	Talk 'N Text	93–97	Cortez (24)			Araneta Coliseum	1–2
4	October 14	Sta.Lucia	92–98	Miller (21)			The Arena in San Juan	1–3
5	October 20	San Miguel	71–81	Miller (30)			Ynares Center	1–4
6	October 27	Purefoods	78–82	Belasco (18)			Araneta Coliseum	1–5
7	October 29	Brgy.Ginebra	91–98	Miller (18)			Araneta Coliseum	1–6

November

Game	Date	Opponent	Score	High points	High rebounds	High assists	Location Attendance	Record
8	November 5	Air21	122–100	Cariaso (24)			Araneta Coliseum	2–6
9	November 10	Sta.Lucia	98–101	Belasco (20)			Araneta Coliseum	2–7
10	November 17	Welcoat	97–91 OT	Belasco (23)			Araneta Coliseum	3–7
11	November 24	Talk 'N Text					Cuneta Astrodome	4–7
12	November 26	Red Bull	105–94	Dela Cruz (18)			Araneta Coliseum	5–7

December

Game	Date	Opponent	Score	High points	High rebounds	High assists	Location Attendance	Record
13	December 2	San Miguel	99–103	Miller, Belasco (20)			General Santos	5–8
14	December 6	Coca Cola	81–85	Miller (18)			Araneta Coliseum	5–9
15	December 9	Brgy.Ginebra	101–108	Miller (23)			Lucena City	5–10
16	December 15	Air21	100–98				Ynares Center	6–10
17	December 20	Welcoat	96–90	Miller (24)			Araneta Coliseum	7–10
18	December 22	Purefoods	96–92 OT	Miller (25)			Araneta Coliseum	8–10

2006–07 schedule

== Fiesta Conference ==
=== Game log ===
2007 PBA Fiesta Conference game log
March

Game	Date	Opponent	Score	High points	High rebounds	High assists	Location Attendance	Record
1	March 7	Talk 'N Text	98–94	Miller (27)			Araneta Coliseum	1–0
2	March 11	Brgy.Ginebra	100–98	Ellis (27)	Ellis (16)		Araneta Coliseum	2–0
3	March 15	Red Bull	113–124 OT	Ellis (27)			Olivarez Gym	2–1
4	March 21	Welcoat	99–78	Ellis (18)			Araneta Coliseum	3–1
5	March 25	Coca Cola	106–100	Miller (19)			Araneta Coliseum	4–1
6	March 31	Purefoods	94–80				Subic Gym, Subic	5–1

April

Game	Date	Opponent	Score	High points	High rebounds	High assists	Location Attendance	Record
7	April 4	Air21	104–116	Ellis (38)			Araneta Coliseum	5–2
8	April 11	San Miguel	94–84	Miller (25)			Araneta Coliseum	6–2
9	April 15	Sta.Lucia	103–88	Miller (21) Ellis (21)			Araneta Coliseum	7–2
10	April 20	Talk 'N Text					Araneta Coliseum	7–3
11	April 24	San Miguel	96–100				Cuneta Astrodome	7–4

May

Game	Date	Opponent	Score	High points	High rebounds	High assists	Location Attendance	Record
12	May 6	Welcoat	74–66	Thoss (15)			Araneta Coliseum	8–4
13	May 11	Brgy.Ginebra	97–91	Miller (22)			Ynares Center	9–4
14	May 13	Coca Cola	90–94	Ellis (23)			Araneta Coliseum	9–5
15	May 18	Purefoods	104–92	Ellis (29)			Araneta Coliseum	10–5
16	May 23	Air21	117–107	Miller (25)			Ynares Center	11–5
17	May 26	Red Bull	103–113	Miller (23)			Bacolod	11–6

June

Game	Date	Opponent	Score	High points	High rebounds	High assists	Location Attendance	Record
18	June 1	Sta.Lucia					Ynares Center	12–6

2006–07 schedule
