= 2006 PBA draft =

Player selection in Philippine basketball

General information
- Date: August 20, 2006
- Time: 4:00 pm
- Location: Market! Market!, Taguig
- Network: ABC

Overview
- League: Philippine Basketball Association
- First selection: Kelly Williams (Sta. Lucia Realtors)

The 2006 Philippine Basketball Association (PBA) rookie draft was an event in which teams drafted players from the amateur ranks. The draft was held at the Market! Market! in Taguig on August 20, 2006.

The Sta. Lucia Realtors choose Kelly Williams of Oakland University and from Magnolia in the PBL as the first overall pick. The players who applied for the draft underwent a week long rookie camp overseen by assistant coaches from five PBA teams.

== Round 1 ==
*	Mythical team member	^{#}	All-star

Pick	Player	Country of origin*	PBA team	College
1	Kelly Williams*	Philippines	Sta. Lucia Realtors	Oakland University
2	Arwind Santos*	Philippines	Air21 Express	FEU
3	Joseph Yeo^{#}	Philippines	Coca-Cola Tigers	De La Salle
4	LA Tenorio*	Philippines	San Miguel Beermen	Ateneo
5	Gabby Espinas^{#}	Philippines	San Miguel Beermen	PCU
6	Mark Isip	Philippines	Sta. Lucia Realtors	FEU
7	Aaron Aban	Philippines	Alaska Aces	Letran
8	Mark Andaya	Philippines	Talk 'N Text Phone Pals	Letran
9	Boyet Bautista	Philippines	Purefoods Chunkee Giants	Letran
10	Abby Santos	Philippines	Welcoat Dragons	UP Diliman

== Round 2 ==
Pick	Player	Country of origin*	PBA team	College
11	Jireh Ibañes	Philippines	Welcoat Dragons	UP Diliman
12	R.J. Rizada	Philippines	Coca-Cola Tigers	FEU
13	Mark Magsumbol	Philippines	Sta. Lucia Realtors	St. Benilde
14	M.C. Caceres	Philippines	Coca-Cola Tigers	PSBA
15	Chris Pacana	Philippines	Coca-Cola Tigers (from Air21 Express)	St. Francis
16	Mike Gavino	Philippines	Coca-Cola Tigers	UP Diliman
17	Ronjay Enrile	Philippines	Coca-Cola Tigers	Letran
18	Christian Luanzon	Philippines	Alaska Aces	UST
19	Magnum Membrere	Philippines	Red Bull Barako	Ateneo
20	Ollan Omiping	Philippines	Purefoods Chunkee Giants	UE

== Welcoat carry-over amateurs ==
Welcoat carried over three amateurs from its Philippine Basketball League team. They are:

Player	Country of origin*	PBA team	College
Junjun Cabatu	Philippines	Welcoat Dragons	De La Salle
Jay-R Reyes	Philippines	Welcoat Dragons	UP Diliman
Jay Sagad	Philippines	Welcoat Dragons	St. Benilde

== Undrafted players ==
Draftee's name followed by college. All undrafted players become Rookie free agents.

- John Paul Alcaraz from (Letran)
- Jonathan Aldave from (Letran)
  - Signed by Talk 'N Text Phone Pals as a free agent for the 2006-07 PBA season.
- Richard Alonzo from (Adamson)
  - Signed by Purefoods Tender Juicy Giants as a free agent for the 2008-09 PBA season.
- Ronnie Bughao from (San Beda)
  - Signed by Sta. Lucia Realtors as a free agent for the 2006-07 PBA season.
- Ryan Cristobal from (San Beda)
- Dennis Daa from (Las Piñas College)
  - Signed by Sta. Lucia as a free agent for the 2007-08 PBA season.
- Erian Daja from (West Negros)
- Ariel de Castro from (NU)
- Don Dulay from (El Camino)
  - Signed by Welcoat Dragons as a free agent for the 2007-08 PBA season.
- Alfie Grijaldo from (NU)
- Bob Ilanga from (U of Mindanao)
- Marlon Kalaw from (MLQU)
- Chico Lanete from (Lyceum)
  - Signed by Purefoods Tender Juicy Giants as a free agent for the 2007-08 PBA season.
- Jerome Paterno from (San Beda)
- Glenn Perseveranda from (Solano)
- Paul Reguera from (UE)
- Frederick Rodriguez from (Letran)
  - Signed by Burger King Whoppers as a free agent for the 2008-09 PBA season Fiesta Cup.
- Denver Roque from (San Sebastian)
- Robert Sanz from (PCU)
  - Signed by Purefoods Tender Juicy Giants as a free agent for the 2007-08 PBA season.
- Alexander Sibug from (Dominican College (New York)
- Nilo Sta. Cruz from (Letran)
- Erwin Sta. Maria from (Mapua)
- Nicole Uy from (San Sebastian)
- Al Vergara from (St. Francis)
  - Signed by Purefoods Tender Juicy Giants as a free agent for the 2008-09 PBA season Fiesta Cup.
- Orvie Vidad from (Newham)

=== Players scrapped from the list ===
Fil-Ams Rob Reyes and Joe Devance were scrapped from the list of rookie hopefuls after failing to submit their requirements even after PBA Commissioner Noli Eala extended the deadline of submission to August 13, 2006. The previous deadline was set on July 31.

Also, Christopher Apaitan of Mindanao State University was struck off the list after not showing in the recently held rookie camp. De La Salle guard John Quioc withdrew from the draft.

== Note ==
*All aspirants are Filipinos until proven otherwise.
