= PBA on ABC =

Branding used for PBA telecasts on ABC in the Philippines

- Also known as: PBA on TV5
- Genre: PBA game telecasts
- Starring: various PBA on ABC/TV5 commentators
- Country of origin: Philippines
- Original languages: Tagalog; English
- No. of episodes: 1,062

Production
- Executive producer: Bobby Barriero
- Camera setup: Multiple-camera setup
- Running time: 150 minutes+
- Production company: ABC/TV5 Sports

Original release
- Network: ABC/TV5
- Release: February 22, 2004 – August 20, 2008

Related
- PBA on NBN/IBC; PBA on Solar TV; PBA on One Sports

PBA on ABC (later renamed as PBA on TV5) is a Philippine television sports presentation show broadcast by ABC/TV5. It aired from February 22, 2004 to August 20, 2008, replacing Ispup and Friday Box Office and was replaced by Lokomoko, Lipgloss and HushHush. The consist of branding used for presentation of Philippine Basketball Association.

== History ==
Due to poor performance and disappointing ratings, the PBA disbanded a broadcasting consortium between the National Broadcasting Network (now PTV-4) and the Intercontinental Broadcasting Corporation after the 2003 season, and took bids on a new broadcast contract for the league. In January 2004, the PBA began a contract with the Associated Broadcasting Company to broadcast PBA games for one year, beating bids from Solar Sports and former Vintage Television owner Bobong Velez’s attempt to form GMA Network’s sports division. The new ABC operation picked up talent from the former NBN/IBC coverage, including Mico Halili, Quinito Henson, Paolo Trillo and Norman Black. Ed Picson was also hired by ABC, after a two-year hiatus from covering the PBA due to a fallout between him and Viva TV in 2002.

After the 2004-05 PBA Philippine Cup, the league and the network extended the contract for the 2005 Fiesta Conference. After the contract expired in 2005, despite a low amount of money offered, the league chose ABC over Solar Sports, who had a much bigger bid than the former. ABC and the PBA then signed a three-year deal that expired after the 2007-08 season.

Citing financial constraints, ABC backed out of bidding for a new contract for the 2008-09 season's PBA coverage. Solar Sports, through local network RPN, would the new broadcast partner of the PBA for the following season.

Even though the network would be dropping the PBA, ABC still rebranded their PBA coverage during their on August 9, 2008 relaunch as TV5 in the middle of the 2008 PBA Fiesta Conference finals (which would also be the final games shown by the network). The final PBA game shown on ABC/TV5 was Game 7 of the Fiesta Conference finals between the Air21 Express and Barangay Ginebra Kings on August 20, 2008. Mico Halili and Jason Webb were the commentators for its last run.

== Commentators ==
=== Play-by-play ===
PBA on ABC's time/score bug during the 2006–07 PBA Philippine Cup.

- Charlie Cuna
- Mico Halili
- Mon Liboro
- Ed Picson
- Benjie Santiago (2004 PBA Fiesta Conference to 2008 PBA Fiesta Conference)
- Boyet Sison
- Hans Montenegro

=== Color ===
- Norman Black (2004 PBA Fiesta Conference to 2007–08 PBA Philippine Cup)
- Paolo Trillo (2004 PBA Fiesta Conference)
- Rado Dimalibot
- Quinito Henson
- Peter Martin
- Barry Pascua
- Leo Isaac
- Chot Reyes
- Joey Sta. Maria
- Dominic Uy
- TJ Manotoc (2004 PBA Fiesta Conference)
- Jason Webb

=== Courtside reporters ===
- Peaches Aberin
- Patricia Bermudez-Hizon
- Stephanie Cueva
- Joy Delorey
- Miakka Lim
- Magoo Marjon
- Niña Sison
- Marga Vargas
- Richard del Rosario (2004–05 PBA Philippine Cup to 2008 PBA Fiesta Conference)
- Eric Reyes (2004–05 PBA Philippine Cup to 2008 PBA Fiesta Conference)
- Dominic Uy
- Rheena Villamor

=== Previous Play-by-Play ===
- Jude Turcuato (2004 PBA Fiesta Conference & 2004–05 PBA Philippine Cup)
- Vitto Lazatin (2004 PBA Fiesta Conference)
- Hans Montenegro (2004 PBA Fiesta Conference)

=== Previous Courtside Reporters ===
- George Rocha (2004 PBA Fiesta Conference)
- Jannelle So (2004 PBA Fiesta Conference)
- Mark Zambrano (2004–05 PBA Philippine Cup)
- Pia Boren (2004–05 PBA Philippine Cup)

== See also ==
- Philippine Basketball Association
- TV5
- iPBA
- PBA on One Sports
- List of TV5 (Philippine TV network) original programming

Preceded by PBA on NBN; PBA on IBC	PBA TV coverage partners 2004–2008	Succeeded by PBA on Solar Sports
