= 2007–08 Coca-Cola Tigers season =

- Head coach: Binky Favis
- General Manager: JB Bailon
- Owner(s): Coca-Cola Bottlers Philippines

Philippine Cup results
- Record: 7–11 (38.9%)
- Place: 9th
- Playoff finish: Quarterfinals

Fiesta Conference results
- Record: 10–8 (55.6%)
- Place: 4th
- Playoff finish: Quarterfinals

Coca-Cola Tigers seasons

The 2007–08 Coca-Cola Tigers season was the 6th season of the franchise in the Philippine Basketball Association (PBA).

After JB Bailon replaced Hector Calma as manager one season ago, Mark Telan was acquired by giving up draft picks, while Joseph Yeo was traded to Sta. Lucia Realtors in exchange of Mark Isip and Cesar Catli.

In mid-season, Tigers acquired Asi Taulava from Talk 'N Text Phone Pals in exchange for Ali Peek. The move made Phone Pals the "team to beat" for the 2008 Fiesta Conference. But with that, the Tigers finished 4th place in the Fiesta Conference, but lost in the quarterfinals against Magnolia Beverage.

== Key dates ==
- August 19: The 2007 PBA Draft took place in Market! Market!, Taguig.

== Draft picks ==
Tigers did not have any draft pick, as Magnolia Beverage Masters, Air21 Express, and Sta. Lucia Realtors owned the team's draft picks because of trades.

== Roster ==
2007–08 Coca-Cola Tigers roster
Players

Pos.	#	POB	Name	Height	Weight	DOB (YYYY–MM–DD)	From
F	1	(Philippines)	Mark Isip	6 ft 4 in (1.93 m)	215 lb (98 kg)		Far Eastern
SG	5	(Philippines)	R.J Rizada	6 ft 2 in (1.88 m)	185 lb (84 kg)		Far Eastern
G/F	6	(Philippines)	Cesar Catli	6 ft 3 in (1.91 m)	185 lb (84 kg)		Far Eastern
PF	7	(Philippines)	M.C. Caceres	6 ft 5 in (1.96 m)	205 lb (93 kg)		PSBA
PG	8	(Philippines)	Aries Dimaunahan	6 ft 0 in (1.83 m)	185 lb (84 kg)		UST
SG	9	(Philippines)	Ronjay Buenafe (R)	6 ft 2 in (1.88 m)	185 lb (84 kg)		Emilio Aguinaldo
PG	12	(Philippines)	Egay Echavez	5 ft 9 in (1.75 m)			Misamis Institute
F/C	13	(Philippines)	Mark Telan	6 ft 7 in (2.01 m)	210 lb (95 kg)		De La Salle
F/C	15	(Philippines)	Jason Misolas	6 ft 3 in (1.91 m)	195 lb (88 kg)		Letran
F/C	16	(Philippines)	Mike Gavino	6 ft 5 in (1.96 m)			UP Diliman
F	19	(Philippines)	Kenneth Duremdes	6 ft 4 in (1.93 m)	190 lb (86 kg)		Adamson
PG	21	(Philippines)	Ronjay Enrile	6 ft 1 in (1.85 m)	168 lb (76 kg)		Letran
F	24	(Philippines)	Ricky Calimag	6 ft 5 in (1.96 m)	210 lb (95 kg)		San Beda
F	31	(United States)	John Arigo	6 ft 5 in (1.96 m)	185 lb (84 kg)		North Florida
G	34	(United States)	William Antonio	6 ft 3 in (1.91 m)	190 lb (86 kg)		Chaminade
G	55	(Philippines)	Alex Cabagnot	6 ft 0 in (1.83 m)	180 lb (82 kg)		Hawaii–Hilo
G/F	81	(Philippines)	Mark Macapagal	6 ft 2 in (1.88 m)	185 lb (84 kg)		San Sebastian
C	88	(Tonga)	Asi Taulava	6 ft 9 in (2.06 m)	245 lb (111 kg)		BYU–Hawaii

Coaches
Head coach
- (Philippines) Binky Favis
Assistant(s)
- (Philippines) Mon Jose
- (Philippines) George Ella

Legend
- (DP) Unsigned draft pick
- (FA) Free agent
- (S) Suspended
- (R) Rookie
- (I) Import
- Injured

== Records ==
=== Philippine Cup ===
==== Team standings ====
Pos	Team	W	L	PCT	GB	Qualification
1	Purefoods Tender Juicy Giants	12	6	.667 (Note: Head-to-head record: Purefoods 2–0 Sta. Lucia)	—	Advance to semifinals
2	Sta. Lucia Realtors	12	6	.667	—	Advance to semifinals
3	Alaska Aces	11	7	.611 (Note: Head-to-head record: Alaska 1–1 Red Bull (Alaska +29))	1	Advance to quarterfinals
4	Red Bull Barako	11	7	.611	1	Advance to quarterfinals
5	Magnolia Beverage Masters	10	8	.556	2	Advance to quarterfinals
6	Talk 'N Text Phone Pals	9	9	.500	3	Advance to wildcard round
7	Barangay Ginebra Kings	8	10	.444	4	Advance to wildcard round
8	Air21 Express	7	11	.389 (Note: Head-to-head record: Air21 2–0 Coca-Cola)	5	Advance to wildcard round
9	Coca-Cola Tigers	7	11	.389	5	Advance to wildcard round
10	Welcoat Dragons	3	15	.167	9	

==== Schedule ====
	Round 1									Round 2								
Team ╲ Game	1	2	3	4	5	6	7	8	9	10	11	12	13	14	15	16	17	18
Air21 Express	MBM	ALA	RBB	Coke	SLR	PF	BGK	TNT	RBB	WEL	BGK	ALA	PF	TNT	Coke	MBM	WEL	SLR
Alaska Aces	TNT	A21	Coke	BGK	WEL	MBM	RBB	PF	WEL	Coke	BGK	SLR	A21	SLR	MBM	RBB	TNT	PF
Barangay Ginebra Kings	RBB	TNT	WEL	ALA	PF	SLR	A21	MBM	Coke	WEL	ALA	A21	SLR	MBM	Coke	PF	RBB	TNT
Coca-Cola Tigers	WEL	ALA	MBM	A21	PF	SLR	TNT	BGK	ALA	SLR	RBB	MBM	WEL	BGK	A21	PF	RBB	TNT
Magnolia Beverage Masters	A21	SLR	PF	Coke	TNT	ALA	WEL	BGK	RBB	PF	TNT	RBB	Coke	BGK	ALA	A21	SLR	WEL
Purefoods Tender Juicy Giants	SLR	TNT	MBM	WEL	BGK	Coke	A21	RBB	ALA	SLR	MBM	TNT	WEL	A21	BGK	Coke	ALA	RBB
Red Bull Barako	BGK	WEL	A21	SLR	TNT	ALA	PF	MBM	TNT	A21	Coke	MBM	SLR	WEL	ALA	BGK	Coke	PF
Sta. Lucia Realtors	PF	MBM	TNT	RBB	A21	BGK	Coke	WEL	PF	Coke	ALA	BGK	RBB	ALA	TNT	WEL	MBM	A21
Talk 'N Text Phone Pals	ALA	PF	BGK	SLR	MBM	RBB	WEL	Coke	A21	RBB	MBM	PF	WEL	A21	SLR	ALA	BGK	Coke
Welcoat Dragons	Coke	RBB	BGK	PF	ALA	TNT	MBM	SLR	ALA	BGK	A21	PF	TNT	Coke	RBB	SLR	A21	MBM

= Win; = OT win; = Loss; = OT loss

==== Bracket ====
Wildcard phase (Single elimination)
6	Talk 'N Text	73
9	Coca-Cola	81
7	Brgy. Ginebra	110
8	Air21	119

Wildcard phase (Single elimination)
9	Coca-Cola	109
8	Air21	102

Quarterfinals (Best-of-3)
3	Alaska	2
9	Coca-Cola	0
4	Red Bull	2
5	Magnolia	0

Semifinals (Best-of-7)
3	Alaska	3
2	Sta. Lucia	4
1	Purefoods	4
4	Red Bull	3

Finals (Best-of-7)
2	Sta. Lucia	4
1	Purefoods	3
Third place
3	Alaska	104
4	Red Bull	125

==== Wildcard phase ====
===== First round =====
ABC

January 18

Coca-Cola Tigers 81, Talk 'N Text Phone Pals 73

Cuneta Astrodome, Pasay

===== Second round =====
ABC

January 20

Coca-Cola Tigers 109, Air21 Express 102

Cuneta Astrodome, Pasay

Coca-Cola and Talk 'N Text met in the first wildcard round, with the two teams making a mid-season trade, with Asi Taulava going to the Tigers while Ali Peek and draft picks going to the Phone Pals. Coke, which had previously denied the Phone Pals of a playoff for the last quarterfinal berth by winning their last elimination round game 2 days earlier, started out strong; the Phone Pals failed to answer to the challenge as they were beaten by the #9 seeds.

Air21 on the other hand faced defending champions Barangay Ginebra Kings, which were decimated by injuries to Billy Mamaril, Mark Caguioa and personal commitments by Rudy Hatfield (Hatfield didn't return) early in the season caused several losses and they had to settle for a wildcard berth. Behind the shooting of team captain Wynne Arboleda, Air21 raced to an early lead. Ginebra cut down the deficit, but while Caguioa was on a fastbreak attempt, Niño Canaleta blocked his shot that virtually ended Ginebra's title defense.

On the final wildcard game, Arboleda wasn't able to sustain his shooting as Taulava and Mark Telan had career games to advance to the quarterfinals to face the Alaska Aces.

==== Quarterfinals ====
===== (3) Alaska vs. (9) Coca-Cola =====
Elimination round games: Alaska won both games, 117-106 and 98-94.

ABC

January 23

Coca-Cola Tigers 82, Alaska Aces 89

Cuneta Astrodome, Pasay

ABC

January 25

Coca-Cola Tigers 100, Alaska Aces 110
Alaska wins series, 2–0

Cuneta Astrodome, Pasay

Alaska ended Coca-Cola's run as the worst-seeded wildcard winner as they were eliminated by the #3 seed. Reigning Most Valuable Player Willie Miller made short work of the Tigers backcourt as Sonny Thoss overran the potent Coke frontcourt by converting outside shots.

=== Fiesta Conference ===
==== Team standings ====
Pos	Team	W	L	PCT	GB	Qualification
1	Air21 Express	12	6	.667	—	Advance to semifinals
2	Red Bull Barako	11	7	.611	1	Advance to semifinals
3	Barangay Ginebra Kings	10	8	.556 (Note: Head-to-head differential: Barangay Ginebra +14, Coca-Cola +4, Magnolia −18)	2	Advance to quarterfinals
4	Coca-Cola Tigers	10	8	.556	2	Advance to quarterfinals
5	Magnolia Beverage Masters	10	8	.556	2	Advance to quarterfinals
6	Alaska Aces	9	9	.500 (Note: Head-to-head record: Alaska 1–1 Talk 'N Text (Alaska +9))	3	Advance to wildcard round
7	Talk 'N Text Phone Pals	9	9	.500	3	Advance to wildcard round
8	Purefoods Tender Juicy Giants	8	10	.444	4	Advance to wildcard round
9	Sta. Lucia Realtors	7	11	.389	5	Advance to wildcard round
10	Welcoat Dragons	4	14	.222	8	

==== Schedule ====
	Round 1									Round 2								
Team ╲ Game	1	2	3	4	5	6	7	8	9	10	11	12	13	14	15	16	17	18
Air21 Express	WEL	RBB	PF	Coke	TNT	ALA	BGK	SLR	Coke	MBM	BGK	RBB	SLR	ALA	TNT	WEL	MBM	PF
Alaska Aces	SLR	BGK	MBM	WEL	RBB	A21	TNT	PF	Coke	RBB	TNT	PF	A21	WEL	SLR	Coke	MBM	BGK
Barangay Ginebra Kings	RBB	ALA	SLR	Coke	MBM	PF	A21	TNT	WEL	A21	MBM	RBB	SLR	PF	Coke	TNT	WEL	ALA
Coca-Cola Tigers	TNT	PF	WEL	A21	BGK	SLR	RBB	MBM	ALA	A21	RBB	WEL	PF	TNT	BGK	MBM	ALA	SLR
Magnolia Beverage Masters	PF	SLR	ALA	TNT	BGK	WEL	RBB	Coke	PF	A21	BGK	TNT	WEL	RBB	SLR	Coke	A21	ALA
Purefoods Tender Juicy Giants	MBM	Coke	A21	RBB	WEL	BGK	ALA	MBM	TNT	SLR	ALA	Coke	WEL	BGK	RBB	TNT	SLR	A21
Red Bull Barako	BGK	A21	TNT	PF	ALA	Coke	MBM	SLR	WEL	ALA	Coke	A21	BGK	MBM	PF	WEL	TNT	SLR
Sta. Lucia Realtors	ALA	MBM	BGK	TNT	Coke	WEL	RBB	A21	TNT	WEL	PF	A21	BGK	MBM	ALA	PF	Coke	RBB
Talk 'N Text Phone Pals	Coke	WEL	RBB	MBM	SLR	A21	ALA	WEL	BGK	SLR	PF	ALA	MBM	Coke	A21	PF	BGK	RBB
Welcoat Dragons	A21	TNT	Coke	ALA	PF	MBM	SLR	TNT	RBB	BGK	SLR	Coke	MBM	PF	ALA	A21	RBB	BGK

= Win; = OT win; = Loss; = OT loss

==== Bracket ====
Wildcard phase (Single elimination)
6	Alaska	85
9	Sta. Lucia	99
7	Talk 'N Text	98
8	Purefoods	83

Wildcard phase (Single elimination)
9	Sta. Lucia	111
7	Talk 'N Text	96

Quarterfinals (Best-of-3)
3	Brgy. Ginebra	2
9	Sta. Lucia	0
4	Coca-Cola	1
5	Magnolia	2

Semifinals (Best-of-7)
3	Brgy. Ginebra	4
2	Red Bull	0
1	Air21	4
5	Magnolia	2

Finals (Best-of-7)
3	Brgy. Ginebra	4
1	Air21	3
Third place
2	Red Bull	102
5	Magnolia	90

==== Quarterfinals ====
===== (4) Coca-Cola vs. (5) Magnolia =====
ABC

July 13

Magnolia Beverage Masters 108, Coca-Cola Tigers 96

Cuneta Astrodome, Pasay

ABC

July 16

Coca-Cola Tigers 91, Magnolia Beverage Masters 90

Ynares Center, Antipolo

ABC

July 18

Magnolia Beverage Masters 78, Coca-Cola Tigers 60
Magnolia wins series 2–1

Ynares Center, Antipolo

== Transactions ==
=== Trades ===
==== Off-season ====
Off-season	To Coca-Cola Tigers Mark Telan	To Air21 Express 1st round picks in the 2007 draft

Off-season	To Coca-Cola Tigers Mark Isip, Cesar Catli	To Sta. Lucia Realtors Joseph Yeo

Off-season	To Coca-Cola Tigers Mark Macapagal	To Barangay Ginebra Kings Chris Pacana

==== Fiesta Conference ====
2008	To Coca-Cola Tigers Asi Taulava	To Talk N' Text Phone Pals Ali Peek

=== Additions ===
Player	Signed
Egay Echavez	2007
Ronjay Buenafe	2007
Aries Dimaunahan	2008

=== Imports recruited ===
Italics are the imports who stayed for the rest of the conference

Player	Debuted
(United States) Calvin Cage	March 4 vs. Welcoat
(United States) Jason Dixon	March 29 vs. Talk 'N Text
(United States) George Gervin, Jr.	April 13 vs. Air21
(United States) Donald Copeland	May 23 vs. Red Bull
(United States) Brandon Dean	Coca-Cola Tigers
