= 2007–08 Alaska Aces season =

- Head coach: Tim Cone
- General Manager: Joaqui Trillo
- Owner(s): Wilfred Uytengsu

Philippine Cup results
- Record: 11–7 (61.1%)
- Place: 3rd
- Playoff finish: Semifinals (lost to Sta. Lucia, 3–4)

Fiesta Conference results
- Record: 9–9 (50%)
- Place: 6th
- Playoff finish: Wildcard (lost to Sta. Lucia)

Alaska Aces seasons

The 2007–08 Alaska Aces season was the 22nd season of the franchise in the Philippine Basketball Association (PBA).

The Aces have good start at the eliminations of the first conference, Philippine Cup, but lost to the eventual champions Sta. Lucia Realtors in the semifinals. Alaska only led once in the series (a Game 1 blowout win), and Sta. Lucia blowout the Aces in Game 2. Due to a 27-point explosion of Kelly Williams, Realtors won and led the series 2–1. Alaska won in Game 4 in 90–83, even they lead more than 26 points and the Realtors cut the lead to 2. Reigning MVP Willie Miller converted three-pointers when the Sta. Lucia came close as he matched Williams' Game 3 output of 27 points to lead all scorers. In Game 5, what happened to the Realtors in Game 4 was happened to the Aces, as a comeback led by John Ferriols and sophomore Aaron Aban cut the lead to 2, but Jeffrey Cariaso was ejected from the game after he was assessed with two technical fouls that led to a cold period between the two teams in the final 6 minutes. With the score unchanged, Willie Miller converted a three-point play to tie at 90-all but the Realtors then scored the last 5 points of the game to put them one step closer to their first All-Filipino conference Finals stint. Even they won the Game 6, thanks to a Miller and Tony dela Cruz each scoring more 20 points with 4 others reaching double figures, they lost in Game 7 due to a with Denok Miranda nailed three-point shots that put the game out reach.

In 2008 Fiesta Conference, the Aces won some of their final games, notably one of them against Coca-Cola Tigers, but eliminated again by Sta. Lucia in the Wildcard round, 99–86.

== Key dates ==
- August 19: The 2007 PBA Draft took place in Fort Bonifacio, Taguig.

== Draft picks ==
Round	Pick	Player	Height	Position	Nationality	College
1	6	Ken Bono	6'4"	Power forward	Philippines	Adamson
1	7	JR Quiñahan	6'5"	Power forward / Center	Philippines	Visayas
2	16	Ardy Larong	6'2"	Shooting guard/Small forward	Philippines	San Jose Recoletos

== Roster ==
2007–08 Alaska Aces roster
Players

Pos.	#	POB	Name	Height	Weight	DOB (YYYY–MM–DD)	From
F/C	4	(Philippines)	JR Quiñahan	6 ft 6 in (1.98 m)	235 lb (107 kg)		Visayas
F	5	(Philippines)	Junjun Cabatu	6 ft 5 in (1.96 m)	215 lb (98 kg)		De La Salle
C	7	(Papua New Guinea)	Sonny Thoss	6 ft 7 in (2.01 m)	205 lb (93 kg)		James Cook
PG	9	(Philippines)	LA Tenorio	5 ft 8 in (1.73 m)	151 lb (68 kg)		Ateneo
F	11	(Philippines)	Eddie Laure	6 ft 3 in (1.91 m)			Adamson
G/F	12	(Philippines)	Larry Fonacier	6 ft 2 in (1.88 m)	170 lb (77 kg)		Ateneo
SG	13	(Philippines)	Willie Miller	5 ft 11 in (1.80 m)	195 lb (88 kg)		Letran
F	17	(Philippines)	Aaron Aban	6 ft 3 in (1.91 m)			Letran
PF	21	(Philippines)	Reynel Hugnatan	6 ft 4 in (1.93 m)	210 lb (95 kg)		Manila
SG	22	(United States)	Jeffrey Cariaso (C)	6 ft 2 in (1.88 m)	180 lb (82 kg)		Sonoma State
C	32	(Philippines)	Poch Juinio	6 ft 5 in (1.96 m)			Philippines
SF	35	(United States)	Tony dela Cruz	6 ft 5 in (1.96 m)	209 lb (95 kg)		UC Irvine
PF	55	(Philippines)	John Ferriols	6 ft 4 in (1.93 m)	210 lb (95 kg)		USJ–R
F		(Philippines)	Christian Luanzon	6 ft 4 in (1.93 m)			UST
F	23	(United States)	Randy Holcomb (I)	6 ft 8 in (2.03 m)	210 lb (95 kg)		San Diego State

Coaches
Head coach
- (United States) Tim Cone
Assistant(s)
- (Philippines) Joel Banal (Mapúa)
- (Philippines) Jojo Lastimosa (Ateneo)
- (Philippines) Dickie Bachmann (De La Salle)
- (Philippines) Luigi Trillo (De La Salle)
- (Philippines) Bong Hawkins (UPHSD)

Legend
- (DP) Unsigned draft pick
- (FA) Free agent
- (S) Suspended
- (I) Import
- Injured

== Philippine Cup ==
=== Eliminations ===
==== Standings ====
Pos	Team	W	L	PCT	GB	Qualification
1	Purefoods Tender Juicy Giants	12	6	.667 (Note: Head-to-head record: Purefoods 2–0 Sta. Lucia)	—	Advance to semifinals
2	Sta. Lucia Realtors	12	6	.667	—	Advance to semifinals
3	Alaska Aces	11	7	.611 (Note: Head-to-head record: Alaska 1–1 Red Bull (Alaska +29))	1	Advance to quarterfinals
4	Red Bull Barako	11	7	.611	1	Advance to quarterfinals
5	Magnolia Beverage Masters	10	8	.556	2	Advance to quarterfinals
6	Talk 'N Text Phone Pals	9	9	.500	3	Advance to wildcard round
7	Barangay Ginebra Kings	8	10	.444	4	Advance to wildcard round
8	Air21 Express	7	11	.389 (Note: Head-to-head record: Air21 2–0 Coca-Cola)	5	Advance to wildcard round
9	Coca-Cola Tigers	7	11	.389	5	Advance to wildcard round
10	Welcoat Dragons	3	15	.167	9	

=== Schedule ===
	Round 1									Round 2								
Team ╲ Game	1	2	3	4	5	6	7	8	9	10	11	12	13	14	15	16	17	18
Air21 Express	MBM	ALA	RBB	Coke	SLR	PF	BGK	TNT	RBB	WEL	BGK	ALA	PF	TNT	Coke	MBM	WEL	SLR
Alaska Aces	TNT	A21	Coke	BGK	WEL	MBM	RBB	PF	WEL	Coke	BGK	SLR	A21	SLR	MBM	RBB	TNT	PF
Barangay Ginebra Kings	RBB	TNT	WEL	ALA	PF	SLR	A21	MBM	Coke	WEL	ALA	A21	SLR	MBM	Coke	PF	RBB	TNT
Coca-Cola Tigers	WEL	ALA	MBM	A21	PF	SLR	TNT	BGK	ALA	SLR	RBB	MBM	WEL	BGK	A21	PF	RBB	TNT
Magnolia Beverage Masters	A21	SLR	PF	Coke	TNT	ALA	WEL	BGK	RBB	PF	TNT	RBB	Coke	BGK	ALA	A21	SLR	WEL
Purefoods Tender Juicy Giants	SLR	TNT	MBM	WEL	BGK	Coke	A21	RBB	ALA	SLR	MBM	TNT	WEL	A21	BGK	Coke	ALA	RBB
Red Bull Barako	BGK	WEL	A21	SLR	TNT	ALA	PF	MBM	TNT	A21	Coke	MBM	SLR	WEL	ALA	BGK	Coke	PF
Sta. Lucia Realtors	PF	MBM	TNT	RBB	A21	BGK	Coke	WEL	PF	Coke	ALA	BGK	RBB	ALA	TNT	WEL	MBM	A21
Talk 'N Text Phone Pals	ALA	PF	BGK	SLR	MBM	RBB	WEL	Coke	A21	RBB	MBM	PF	WEL	A21	SLR	ALA	BGK	Coke
Welcoat Dragons	Coke	RBB	BGK	PF	ALA	TNT	MBM	SLR	ALA	BGK	A21	PF	TNT	Coke	RBB	SLR	A21	MBM

= Win; = OT win; = Loss; = OT loss

=== Bracket ===
Wildcard phase (single elimination)
6	Talk 'N Text	73
9	Coca-Cola	81
7	Brgy. Ginebra	110
8	Air21	119

Wildcard phase (single elimination)
9	Coca-Cola	109
8	Air21	102

Quarterfinals (best-of-3)
3	Alaska	2
9	Coca-Cola	0
4	Red Bull	2
5	Magnolia	0

Semifinals (best-of-7)
3	Alaska	3
2	Sta. Lucia	4
1	Purefoods	4
4	Red Bull	3

Finals (best-of-7)
2	Sta. Lucia	4
1	Purefoods	3
Third place
3	Alaska	104
4	Red Bull	125

==== Semifinals ====
Wins	Date	January 27	January 30	February 1	February 3	February 6	February 8	February 10
Wins		Game 1	Game 2	Game 3	Game 4	Game 5	Game 6	Game 7
4	Sta. Lucia (2)	94	86	91	80	96	87	92
3	Alaska (3)	107	77	82	93	90	106	84

== Fiesta Conference ==
=== Eliminations ===
Pos	Team	W	L	PCT	GB	Qualification
1	Air21 Express	12	6	.667	—	Advance to semifinals
2	Red Bull Barako	11	7	.611	1	Advance to semifinals
3	Barangay Ginebra Kings	10	8	.556 (Note: Head-to-head differential: Barangay Ginebra +14, Coca-Cola +4, Magnolia −18)	2	Advance to quarterfinals
4	Coca-Cola Tigers	10	8	.556	2	Advance to quarterfinals
5	Magnolia Beverage Masters	10	8	.556	2	Advance to quarterfinals
6	Alaska Aces	9	9	.500 (Note: Head-to-head record: Alaska 1–1 Talk 'N Text (Alaska +9))	3	Advance to wildcard round
7	Talk 'N Text Phone Pals	9	9	.500	3	Advance to wildcard round
8	Purefoods Tender Juicy Giants	8	10	.444	4	Advance to wildcard round
9	Sta. Lucia Realtors	7	11	.389	5	Advance to wildcard round
10	Welcoat Dragons	4	14	.222	8	

=== Schedule ===
	Round 1									Round 2								
Team ╲ Game	1	2	3	4	5	6	7	8	9	10	11	12	13	14	15	16	17	18
Air21 Express	WEL	RBB	PF	Coke	TNT	ALA	BGK	SLR	Coke	MBM	BGK	RBB	SLR	ALA	TNT	WEL	MBM	PF
Alaska Aces	SLR	BGK	MBM	WEL	RBB	A21	TNT	PF	Coke	RBB	TNT	PF	A21	WEL	SLR	Coke	MBM	BGK
Barangay Ginebra Kings	RBB	ALA	SLR	Coke	MBM	PF	A21	TNT	WEL	A21	MBM	RBB	SLR	PF	Coke	TNT	WEL	ALA
Coca-Cola Tigers	TNT	PF	WEL	A21	BGK	SLR	RBB	MBM	ALA	A21	RBB	WEL	PF	TNT	BGK	MBM	ALA	SLR
Magnolia Beverage Masters	PF	SLR	ALA	TNT	BGK	WEL	RBB	Coke	PF	A21	BGK	TNT	WEL	RBB	SLR	Coke	A21	ALA
Purefoods Tender Juicy Giants	MBM	Coke	A21	RBB	WEL	BGK	ALA	MBM	TNT	SLR	ALA	Coke	WEL	BGK	RBB	TNT	SLR	A21
Red Bull Barako	BGK	A21	TNT	PF	ALA	Coke	MBM	SLR	WEL	ALA	Coke	A21	BGK	MBM	PF	WEL	TNT	SLR
Sta. Lucia Realtors	ALA	MBM	BGK	TNT	Coke	WEL	RBB	A21	TNT	WEL	PF	A21	BGK	MBM	ALA	PF	Coke	RBB
Talk 'N Text Phone Pals	Coke	WEL	RBB	MBM	SLR	A21	ALA	WEL	BGK	SLR	PF	ALA	MBM	Coke	A21	PF	BGK	RBB
Welcoat Dragons	A21	TNT	Coke	ALA	PF	MBM	SLR	TNT	RBB	BGK	SLR	Coke	MBM	PF	ALA	A21	RBB	BGK

= Win; = OT win; = Loss; = OT loss

=== Bracket ===
Wildcard phase (Single elimination)
6	Alaska	85
9	Sta. Lucia	99
7	Talk 'N Text	98
8	Purefoods	83

Wildcard phase (Single elimination)
9	Sta. Lucia	111
7	Talk 'N Text	96

Quarterfinals (Best-of-3)
3	Brgy. Ginebra	2
9	Sta. Lucia	0
4	Coca-Cola	1
5	Magnolia	2

Semifinals (Best-of-7)
3	Brgy. Ginebra	4
2	Red Bull	0
1	Air21	4
5	Magnolia	2

Finals (Best-of-7)
3	Brgy. Ginebra	4
1	Air21	3
Third place
2	Red Bull	102
5	Magnolia	90

== Transactions ==
=== Trades ===
March 23, 2008	To Alaska Aces LA Tenorio, Larry Fonacier	To Magnolia Beverage Masters Mike Cortez, Ken Bono
