= 2007–08 Red Bull Barako season =

- Head coach: Yeng Guiao
- General Manager: Tony Chua
- Owner(s): Tony Chua

Philippine Cup results
- Record: 11–7 (61.1%)
- Place: 4th
- Playoff finish: 3rd place

Fiesta Conference results
- Record: 11–7 (61.1%)
- Place: 2nd
- Playoff finish: 3rd place

Red Bull Barako seasons

The 2007–08 Red Bull Barako season was the 8th season of the franchise in the Philippine Basketball Association (PBA).

== Key dates ==
- August 19: The 2007 PBA draft took place in Fort Bonifacio, Taguig.

== Draft picks ==
Round	Pick	Player	Height	Position	Nationality	College
2	15	Jojo Duncil	6'1"	Guard	Philippines	UST

== Roster ==
2007–08 Red Bull Barako roster
Players

Pos.	#	POB	Name	Height	Weight	DOB (YYYY–MM–DD)	From
G	1	(Philippines)	Celino Cruz	5 ft 9 in (1.75 m)			Far Eastern
G	4	(Philippines)	Warren Ybañez	5 ft 8 in (1.73 m)			PSBA
PG	5	(Philippines)	Topex Robinson	5 ft 8 in (1.73 m)			San Sebastian
F/C	7	(Australia)	Mick Pennisi	6 ft 9 in (2.06 m)			Eastern Michigan
G/F	8	(Philippines)	Cyrus Baguio	6 ft 2 in (1.88 m)			UST
G	9	(Philippines)	Francis Adriano	6 ft 0 in (1.83 m)	170 lb (77 kg)		Far Eastern
G	11	(Philippines)	Jojo Duncil	6 ft 1 in (1.85 m)			UST
F	14	(Philippines)	Leo Najorda	6 ft 3 in (1.91 m)			San Sebastian
PG	16	(Philippines)	Magnum Membrere	5 ft 11 in (1.80 m)	170 lb (77 kg)		Ateneo
G	18	(Philippines)	Reed Juntilla	6 ft 2 in (1.88 m)	180 lb (82 kg)		Visayas
F/C	21	(Philippines)	Paolo Bugia	6 ft 6 in (1.98 m)			Ateneo
F	32	(Philippines)	Rich Alvarez	6 ft 4 in (1.93 m)			Ateneo
F/C	34	(Philippines)	Carlo Sharma	6 ft 6 in (1.98 m)			De La Salle
F	41	(United States)	Mike Hrabak	6 ft 6 in (1.98 m)			Central Arizona
C	44	(Philippines)	Mark Andaya	6 ft 9 in (2.06 m)	245 lb (111 kg)		Letran
F	66	(Philippines)	Don Camaso	6 ft 6 in (1.98 m)			Metro Manila Colleges
F	55	(Mexico)	Adam Parada (I)	7 ft 0 in (2.13 m)			UC Irvine

Coaches
Head coach
- (Philippines) Yeng Guiao
Assistant(s)
- (Philippines) Roehl Nadurata
- (Philippines) Gee Abanilla

Legend
- (DP) Unsigned draft pick
- (FA) Free agent
- (S) Suspended
- (I) Import
- Injured

== Season ==
=== Philippine Cup ===
==== Team standings ====
Pos	Team	W	L	PCT	GB	Qualification
1	Purefoods Tender Juicy Giants	12	6	.667 (Note: Head-to-head record: Purefoods 2–0 Sta. Lucia)	—	Advance to semifinals
2	Sta. Lucia Realtors	12	6	.667	—	Advance to semifinals
3	Alaska Aces	11	7	.611 (Note: Head-to-head record: Alaska 1–1 Red Bull (Alaska +29))	1	Advance to quarterfinals
4	Red Bull Barako	11	7	.611	1	Advance to quarterfinals
5	Magnolia Beverage Masters	10	8	.556	2	Advance to quarterfinals
6	Talk 'N Text Phone Pals	9	9	.500	3	Advance to wildcard round
7	Barangay Ginebra Kings	8	10	.444	4	Advance to wildcard round
8	Air21 Express	7	11	.389 (Note: Head-to-head record: Air21 2–0 Coca-Cola)	5	Advance to wildcard round
9	Coca-Cola Tigers	7	11	.389	5	Advance to wildcard round
10	Welcoat Dragons	3	15	.167	9	

==== Schedule ====
	Round 1									Round 2								
Team ╲ Game	1	2	3	4	5	6	7	8	9	10	11	12	13	14	15	16	17	18
Air21 Express	MBM	ALA	RBB	Coke	SLR	PF	BGK	TNT	RBB	WEL	BGK	ALA	PF	TNT	Coke	MBM	WEL	SLR
Alaska Aces	TNT	A21	Coke	BGK	WEL	MBM	RBB	PF	WEL	Coke	BGK	SLR	A21	SLR	MBM	RBB	TNT	PF
Barangay Ginebra Kings	RBB	TNT	WEL	ALA	PF	SLR	A21	MBM	Coke	WEL	ALA	A21	SLR	MBM	Coke	PF	RBB	TNT
Coca-Cola Tigers	WEL	ALA	MBM	A21	PF	SLR	TNT	BGK	ALA	SLR	RBB	MBM	WEL	BGK	A21	PF	RBB	TNT
Magnolia Beverage Masters	A21	SLR	PF	Coke	TNT	ALA	WEL	BGK	RBB	PF	TNT	RBB	Coke	BGK	ALA	A21	SLR	WEL
Purefoods Tender Juicy Giants	SLR	TNT	MBM	WEL	BGK	Coke	A21	RBB	ALA	SLR	MBM	TNT	WEL	A21	BGK	Coke	ALA	RBB
Red Bull Barako	BGK	WEL	A21	SLR	TNT	ALA	PF	MBM	TNT	A21	Coke	MBM	SLR	WEL	ALA	BGK	Coke	PF
Sta. Lucia Realtors	PF	MBM	TNT	RBB	A21	BGK	Coke	WEL	PF	Coke	ALA	BGK	RBB	ALA	TNT	WEL	MBM	A21
Talk 'N Text Phone Pals	ALA	PF	BGK	SLR	MBM	RBB	WEL	Coke	A21	RBB	MBM	PF	WEL	A21	SLR	ALA	BGK	Coke
Welcoat Dragons	Coke	RBB	BGK	PF	ALA	TNT	MBM	SLR	ALA	BGK	A21	PF	TNT	Coke	RBB	SLR	A21	MBM

= Win; = OT win; = Loss; = OT loss

==== Bracket ====
Wildcard phase (single elimination)
6	Talk 'N Text	73
9	Coca-Cola	81
7	Brgy. Ginebra	110
8	Air21	119

Wildcard phase (single elimination)
9	Coca-Cola	109
8	Air21	102

Quarterfinals (best-of-3)
3	Alaska	2
9	Coca-Cola	0
4	Red Bull	2
5	Magnolia	0

Semifinals (best-of-7)
3	Alaska	3
2	Sta. Lucia	4
1	Purefoods	4
4	Red Bull	3

Finals (best-of-7)
2	Sta. Lucia	4
1	Purefoods	3
Third place
3	Alaska	104
4	Red Bull	125

==== Quarterfinals: (4) Red Bull vs. (5) Magnolia ====
Elimination round games: Red Bull won both games, 94-88 and 107-95.

ABC

January 23

Magnolia Beverage Masters 104, Red Bull Barako 107

Cuneta Astrodome, Pasay

ABC

January 25

Magnolia Beverage Masters 94, Red Bull Barako 112
Red Bull wins series, 2–0

Cuneta Astrodome, Pasay

Magnolia and Red Bull renewed their playoffs rivalry with Red Bull forcing the upset, as Magnolia was rated as the top team during the preseason, with Red Bull being decimated by one-sided trades (ironically to Magnolia). Cyrus Baguio had a coming-out party as he scored a career-high 31 points to win Game 1 for the Bulls. Junthy Valenzuela outplayed former Red Bull players Lordy Tugade and Enrico Villanueva to sweep the Beverage Masters.

The Bulls now clinch their sixth consecutive semifinals appearance.

==== Semifinals: (1) Purefoods vs. (4) Red Bull ====
Elimination round games: Red Bull won both games, 87-74 and 97-84.

ABC

January 27

Red Bull Barako 84, Purefoods Tender Juicy Giants 103

Cuneta Astrodome, Pasay

ABC

January 30

Red Bull Barako 93, Purefoods Tender Juicy Giants 89

Cuneta Astrodome, Pasay

ABC

February 1

Red Bull Barako 90, Purefoods Tender Juicy Giants 99

Cuneta Astrodome, Pasay

ABC

February 3

Red Bull Barako 97, Purefoods Tender Juicy Giants 88 (OT)

Cuneta Astrodome, Pasay

ABC

February 6

Red Bull Barako 95, Purefoods Tender Juicy Giants 96

Araneta Coliseum, Quezon City

ABC

February 8

Red Bull Barako 123, Purefoods Tender Juicy Giants 97

Araneta Coliseum, Quezon City

ABC

February 10

Red Bull Barako 71, Purefoods Tender Juicy Giants 83
Purefoods wins series, 4–3

Araneta Coliseum, Quezon City

Purefoods, owing to a couple of weeks' rest blew out Red Bull which had defeated last season's finalists in Game 1. However, Red Bull came back in Game 2 to put up a defensive stand in the fourth quarter to tie the series, 2-2. Team captain Junthy Valenzuela kept the Giants at bay when they were making a run in the final minutes, scoring 2 crucial baskets. Purefoods then did their own pull-away at Game 3, crashing the boards at will; Marc Pingris rebounded a career-high 19 boards.

With a 1-3 series deficit looming, Red Bull again kept a pace with Purefoods in Game 4; however James Yap injured his groin in the first quarter after scoring ten points and didn't return. Purefoods managed to hold-off Red Bull until Cyrus Baguio drove to the basket after a pick-and-roll for an unmolested lay-up to tie the game 86-all. Peter June Simon missed his baseline jumper as time ran out to force overtime. In the extra period, Red Bull made an 11-2 run care of three pointers from Celino Cruz and Francis Adriano to tie the series once again.

After the injury to Yap, Purefoods coach Ryan Gregorio announced prior to Game 5 that Yap would be day-to-day. However, Yap started on Game 5 and Purefoods raced to a 40-17 lead after the first quarter. Red Bull crept up the lead and eventually cut down the lead to two with a minute to go thanks to a trey from Mick Pennisi. In the ensuing possession, Pingris was fouled on the act of shooting; Pingris missed both of his freethrows to give Red Bull another chance. After the time out and with both teams in penalty, Valenzuela was fouled. Valenzuela converted the first but missed the second, which led to a Kerby Raymundo rebound that sealed the win for the Giants.

Needing to win twice in a row to enter the finals, Red Bull started Game 6 with a 20-1 blast that caught Purefoods flatfooted. The Bulls then cruised on, with Mike Hrabak and Pennisi shooting treys to tie the series for last time, at 3-all. However, Purefoods started out Game 7 strong but the Barakos answered every Giants run to keep pace; however, thanks to misses from the perimeter by Red Bull and Purefoods' transition defense, the Giants were able to clinch their league-leading 12th All-Filipino Cup finals appearance.

==== Third-place playoff ====
ABC

February 15

Alaska Aces 104, Red Bull Barako 125
Red Bull wins 3rd place trophy.

Araneta Coliseum, Quezon City

=== Fiesta Conference ===
==== Team standings ====
Pos	Team	W	L	PCT	GB	Qualification
1	Air21 Express	12	6	.667	—	Advance to semifinals
2	Red Bull Barako	11	7	.611	1	Advance to semifinals
3	Barangay Ginebra Kings	10	8	.556 (Note: Head-to-head differential: Barangay Ginebra +14, Coca-Cola +4, Magnolia −18)	2	Advance to quarterfinals
4	Coca-Cola Tigers	10	8	.556	2	Advance to quarterfinals
5	Magnolia Beverage Masters	10	8	.556	2	Advance to quarterfinals
6	Alaska Aces	9	9	.500 (Note: Head-to-head record: Alaska 1–1 Talk 'N Text (Alaska +9))	3	Advance to wildcard round
7	Talk 'N Text Phone Pals	9	9	.500	3	Advance to wildcard round
8	Purefoods Tender Juicy Giants	8	10	.444	4	Advance to wildcard round
9	Sta. Lucia Realtors	7	11	.389	5	Advance to wildcard round
10	Welcoat Dragons	4	14	.222	8	

==== Schedule ====
	Round 1									Round 2								
Team ╲ Game	1	2	3	4	5	6	7	8	9	10	11	12	13	14	15	16	17	18
Air21 Express	WEL	RBB	PF	Coke	TNT	ALA	BGK	SLR	Coke	MBM	BGK	RBB	SLR	ALA	TNT	WEL	MBM	PF
Alaska Aces	SLR	BGK	MBM	WEL	RBB	A21	TNT	PF	Coke	RBB	TNT	PF	A21	WEL	SLR	Coke	MBM	BGK
Barangay Ginebra Kings	RBB	ALA	SLR	Coke	MBM	PF	A21	TNT	WEL	A21	MBM	RBB	SLR	PF	Coke	TNT	WEL	ALA
Coca-Cola Tigers	TNT	PF	WEL	A21	BGK	SLR	RBB	MBM	ALA	A21	RBB	WEL	PF	TNT	BGK	MBM	ALA	SLR
Magnolia Beverage Masters	PF	SLR	ALA	TNT	BGK	WEL	RBB	Coke	PF	A21	BGK	TNT	WEL	RBB	SLR	Coke	A21	ALA
Purefoods Tender Juicy Giants	MBM	Coke	A21	RBB	WEL	BGK	ALA	MBM	TNT	SLR	ALA	Coke	WEL	BGK	RBB	TNT	SLR	A21
Red Bull Barako	BGK	A21	TNT	PF	ALA	Coke	MBM	SLR	WEL	ALA	Coke	A21	BGK	MBM	PF	WEL	TNT	SLR
Sta. Lucia Realtors	ALA	MBM	BGK	TNT	Coke	WEL	RBB	A21	TNT	WEL	PF	A21	BGK	MBM	ALA	PF	Coke	RBB
Talk 'N Text Phone Pals	Coke	WEL	RBB	MBM	SLR	A21	ALA	WEL	BGK	SLR	PF	ALA	MBM	Coke	A21	PF	BGK	RBB
Welcoat Dragons	A21	TNT	Coke	ALA	PF	MBM	SLR	TNT	RBB	BGK	SLR	Coke	MBM	PF	ALA	A21	RBB	BGK

= Win; = OT win; = Loss; = OT loss

==== Bracket ====
Wildcard phase (Single elimination)
6	Alaska	85
9	Sta. Lucia	99
7	Talk 'N Text	98
8	Purefoods	83

Wildcard phase (Single elimination)
9	Sta. Lucia	111
7	Talk 'N Text	96

Quarterfinals (Best-of-3)
3	Brgy. Ginebra	2
9	Sta. Lucia	0
4	Coca-Cola	1
5	Magnolia	2

Semifinals (Best-of-7)
3	Brgy. Ginebra	4
2	Red Bull	0
1	Air21	4
5	Magnolia	2

Finals (Best-of-7)
3	Brgy. Ginebra	4
1	Air21	3
Third place
2	Red Bull	102
5	Magnolia	90

==== Semifinals: (2) Red Bull vs. (3) Barangay Ginebra ====
ABC

July 20

Red Bull Barako 82, Barangay Ginebra Kings 108

Cuneta Astrodome, Pasay

ABC

July 23

Barangay Ginebra Kings 111, Red Bull Barako 104

Araneta Coliseum, Quezon City

ABC

July 25

Red Bull Barako 91, Barangay Ginebra Kings 94

Ynares Center, Antipolo

ABC

July 27

Barangay Ginebra Kings 101, Red Bull Barako 97 (OT)
Barangay Ginebra wins series, 4–0

Araneta Coliseum, Quezon City

==== Third place playoff ====
ABC

August 6

Red Bull Barako 102, Magnolia Beverage Masters 90
Scoring by quarter: 28-22, 15-26, 27-37, 20-17

Araneta Coliseum, Quezon City

== Transactions ==
=== Trades ===
2007	To Red Bull Barako Rommel Adducul	To San Miguel Beermen Enrico Villanueva
2007	To Red Bull Barako Chris Calaguio, Francis Adriano, Brandon Cablay	To San Miguel Beermen Larry Fonacier
2007	To Red Bull Barako Don Camaso	To Purefoods Tender Juicy Giants Rommel Adducul, Brandon Cablay

=== Additions ===
Player	Signed	New team
Carlo Sharma	2006	Shell Turbo Chargers

=== Subtractions ===
Player	New team
EJ Feihl	Welcoat Dragons
Migs Noble	Talk 'N Text Phone Pals
