= 2007–08 Welcoat Dragons season =

- Head coach: Leo Austria; Caloy Garcia (Fiesta Conference)
- General Manager: Boy Lapid
- Owner(s): Asian Coating, Inc.

Philippine Cup results
- Record: 3–15 (16.7%)
- Place: 10th
- Playoff finish: Eliminated

Fiesta Conference results
- Record: 4–14 (22.2%)
- Place: 10th
- Playoff finish: Eliminated

Welcoat Dragons seasons

The 2007–08 Welcoat Dragons season was the 2nd season of the franchise in the Philippine Basketball Association (PBA). The Dragons are lower seeded in both conferences of the season.

The Dragons drafted future star Joe Devance as first overall, and Ryan Araña of De La Salle in the second round. The Dragons secured a Php 8.7 million contract for Devance.

Before the Fiesta Conference, Caloy Garcia was appointed as head coach, as Leo Austria will focus on his duties as head coach of Adamson Soaring Falcons.

== Key dates ==
August 20: The 2007 PBA Draft took place in Fort Bonifacio, Taguig.

== Draft picks ==
Round	Pick	Player	Height	Position	Nationality	College
1	1	Joe Devance	6'8"	Power Forward	United States	Texas-El Paso
2	12	Ryan Araña	6'2"	Shooting Guard	Philippines	De La Salle

== Roster ==
2007–08 Welcoat Dragons roster
Players

Pos.	#	POB	Name	Height	Weight	DOB (YYYY–MM–DD)	From
F	2	(Philippines)	Estong Ballesteros	6 ft 5 in (1.96 m)			UST
F	5	(United States)	Rob Wainwright	6 ft 5 in (1.96 m)	200 lb (91 kg)		Solano CC
F	6	(Philippines)	Jireh Ibañes	6 ft 2 in (1.88 m)	168 lb (76 kg)		Philippines
F/C	8	(Philippines)	Jay-R Reyes	6 ft 7 in (2.01 m)	215 lb (98 kg)		Philippines
G	11	(United States)	Don Dulay	5 ft 8 in (1.73 m)	150 lb (68 kg)		El Camino
G/F	14	(Philippines)	Niño Gelig	6 ft 2 in (1.88 m)	170 lb (77 kg)		UST
F/C	16	(Philippines)	Adonis Santa Maria	6 ft 5 in (1.96 m)	205 lb (93 kg)		De La Salle
G	17	(Philippines)	Froilan Baguion	5 ft 8 in (1.73 m)	150 lb (68 kg)		National-U
G	18	(Philippines)	Ryan Araña	6 ft 1 in (1.85 m)			De La Salle
G/F	19	(Philippines)	Jojo Tangkay	6 ft 2 in (1.88 m)	168 lb (76 kg)		Southwestern-U
G	21	(Philippines)	Joey Mente	5 ft 9 in (1.75 m)	180 lb (82 kg)		Lyceum
F	24	(Philippines)	Allan Salangsang	6 ft 5 in (1.96 m)	200 lb (91 kg)		Letran
G	44	(United States)	Denver Lopez	6 ft 2 in (1.88 m)	179 lb (81 kg)		Cal State Fullerton
F	53	(United States)	Joe Devance	6 ft 8 in (2.03 m)			UTEP
F	88	(Philippines)	Jay Sagad	6 ft 4 in (1.93 m)	220 lb (100 kg)		St. Benilde
G	22	(United States)	Alex Compton (I)	5 ft 11 in (1.80 m)	175 lb (79 kg)		Cornell

Coaches

Head coach

- (Philippines) Caloy Garcia

Assistant coach(es)

- (Philippines) Alex Compton

Legend

- (C) Team captain
- (I) Import
- Injured

== Season ==
=== Philippine Cup ===
==== Team standings ====
Pos	Team	W	L	PCT	GB	Qualification
1	Purefoods Tender Juicy Giants	12	6	.667 (Note: Head-to-head record: Purefoods 2–0 Sta. Lucia)	—	Advance to semifinals
2	Sta. Lucia Realtors	12	6	.667	—	Advance to semifinals
3	Alaska Aces	11	7	.611 (Note: Head-to-head record: Alaska 1–1 Red Bull (Alaska +29))	1	Advance to quarterfinals
4	Red Bull Barako	11	7	.611	1	Advance to quarterfinals
5	Magnolia Beverage Masters	10	8	.556	2	Advance to quarterfinals
6	Talk 'N Text Phone Pals	9	9	.500	3	Advance to wildcard round
7	Barangay Ginebra Kings	8	10	.444	4	Advance to wildcard round
8	Air21 Express	7	11	.389 (Note: Head-to-head record: Air21 2–0 Coca-Cola)	5	Advance to wildcard round
9	Coca-Cola Tigers	7	11	.389	5	Advance to wildcard round
10	Welcoat Dragons	3	15	.167	9	

==== Schedule ====
	Round 1									Round 2								
Team ╲ Game	1	2	3	4	5	6	7	8	9	10	11	12	13	14	15	16	17	18
Air21 Express	MBM	ALA	RBB	Coke	SLR	PF	BGK	TNT	RBB	WEL	BGK	ALA	PF	TNT	Coke	MBM	WEL	SLR
Alaska Aces	TNT	A21	Coke	BGK	WEL	MBM	RBB	PF	WEL	Coke	BGK	SLR	A21	SLR	MBM	RBB	TNT	PF
Barangay Ginebra Kings	RBB	TNT	WEL	ALA	PF	SLR	A21	MBM	Coke	WEL	ALA	A21	SLR	MBM	Coke	PF	RBB	TNT
Coca-Cola Tigers	WEL	ALA	MBM	A21	PF	SLR	TNT	BGK	ALA	SLR	RBB	MBM	WEL	BGK	A21	PF	RBB	TNT
Magnolia Beverage Masters	A21	SLR	PF	Coke	TNT	ALA	WEL	BGK	RBB	PF	TNT	RBB	Coke	BGK	ALA	A21	SLR	WEL
Purefoods Tender Juicy Giants	SLR	TNT	MBM	WEL	BGK	Coke	A21	RBB	ALA	SLR	MBM	TNT	WEL	A21	BGK	Coke	ALA	RBB
Red Bull Barako	BGK	WEL	A21	SLR	TNT	ALA	PF	MBM	TNT	A21	Coke	MBM	SLR	WEL	ALA	BGK	Coke	PF
Sta. Lucia Realtors	PF	MBM	TNT	RBB	A21	BGK	Coke	WEL	PF	Coke	ALA	BGK	RBB	ALA	TNT	WEL	MBM	A21
Talk 'N Text Phone Pals	ALA	PF	BGK	SLR	MBM	RBB	WEL	Coke	A21	RBB	MBM	PF	WEL	A21	SLR	ALA	BGK	Coke
Welcoat Dragons	Coke	RBB	BGK	PF	ALA	TNT	MBM	SLR	ALA	BGK	A21	PF	TNT	Coke	RBB	SLR	A21	MBM

= Win; = OT win; = Loss; = OT loss

=== Fiesta Conference ===
==== Team standings ====
Pos	Team	W	L	PCT	GB	Qualification
1	Air21 Express	12	6	.667	—	Advance to semifinals
2	Red Bull Barako	11	7	.611	1	Advance to semifinals
3	Barangay Ginebra Kings	10	8	.556 (Note: Head-to-head differential: Barangay Ginebra +14, Coca-Cola +4, Magnolia −18)	2	Advance to quarterfinals
4	Coca-Cola Tigers	10	8	.556	2	Advance to quarterfinals
5	Magnolia Beverage Masters	10	8	.556	2	Advance to quarterfinals
6	Alaska Aces	9	9	.500 (Note: Head-to-head record: Alaska 1–1 Talk 'N Text (Alaska +9))	3	Advance to wildcard round
7	Talk 'N Text Phone Pals	9	9	.500	3	Advance to wildcard round
8	Purefoods Tender Juicy Giants	8	10	.444	4	Advance to wildcard round
9	Sta. Lucia Realtors	7	11	.389	5	Advance to wildcard round
10	Welcoat Dragons	4	14	.222	8	

==== Schedule ====
	Round 1									Round 2								
Team ╲ Game	1	2	3	4	5	6	7	8	9	10	11	12	13	14	15	16	17	18
Air21 Express	WEL	RBB	PF	Coke	TNT	ALA	BGK	SLR	Coke	MBM	BGK	RBB	SLR	ALA	TNT	WEL	MBM	PF
Alaska Aces	SLR	BGK	MBM	WEL	RBB	A21	TNT	PF	Coke	RBB	TNT	PF	A21	WEL	SLR	Coke	MBM	BGK
Barangay Ginebra Kings	RBB	ALA	SLR	Coke	MBM	PF	A21	TNT	WEL	A21	MBM	RBB	SLR	PF	Coke	TNT	WEL	ALA
Coca-Cola Tigers	TNT	PF	WEL	A21	BGK	SLR	RBB	MBM	ALA	A21	RBB	WEL	PF	TNT	BGK	MBM	ALA	SLR
Magnolia Beverage Masters	PF	SLR	ALA	TNT	BGK	WEL	RBB	Coke	PF	A21	BGK	TNT	WEL	RBB	SLR	Coke	A21	ALA
Purefoods Tender Juicy Giants	MBM	Coke	A21	RBB	WEL	BGK	ALA	MBM	TNT	SLR	ALA	Coke	WEL	BGK	RBB	TNT	SLR	A21
Red Bull Barako	BGK	A21	TNT	PF	ALA	Coke	MBM	SLR	WEL	ALA	Coke	A21	BGK	MBM	PF	WEL	TNT	SLR
Sta. Lucia Realtors	ALA	MBM	BGK	TNT	Coke	WEL	RBB	A21	TNT	WEL	PF	A21	BGK	MBM	ALA	PF	Coke	RBB
Talk 'N Text Phone Pals	Coke	WEL	RBB	MBM	SLR	A21	ALA	WEL	BGK	SLR	PF	ALA	MBM	Coke	A21	PF	BGK	RBB
Welcoat Dragons	A21	TNT	Coke	ALA	PF	MBM	SLR	TNT	RBB	BGK	SLR	Coke	MBM	PF	ALA	A21	RBB	BGK

= Win; = OT win; = Loss; = OT loss

== Transactions ==
=== Subtractions ===
Player	Year	New team
Junjun Cabatu	2007	Alaska Aces
Gilbert Lao	2007	Barangay Ginebra Kings

=== Imports ===
Name	
(United States) Jason Keep	March 30 vs. Air21
(United States) Cory Santee	March 30 vs. Air21
(United States) Marquis Gainous	April 9 vs. Coca-Cola
(United States) Alex Compton	June 18 vs. Air21
