= 2007–08 Talk 'N Text Phone Pals season =

- Head coach: Derrick Pumaren (Philippine Cup); Chot Reyes (Fiesta Conference)
- General Manager: Frankie Lim; Virgil Villavicencio (assistant)
- Owner(s): Smart Communications (an MVP Group subsidiary)

Philippine Cup results
- Record: 9–9 (50%)
- Place: 6th
- Playoff finish: Lost in the Wildcard First Phase

Fiesta Conference results
- Record: 9–9 (50%)
- Place: 7th
- Playoff finish: Lost in Wildcard First Round

Talk 'N Text Phone Pals seasons

The 2007–08 Talk 'N Text Phone Pals season was the 18th season of the franchise in the Philippine Basketball Association (PBA).

Phone Pals' notable move in this season was trading its superstar Asi Taulava to Coca-Cola Tigers for Ali Peek. Due to Peek's defensive specialization the move made them the "team to beat" for the 2008 Fiesta Conference, but they failed to make it past the wildcard phase. He won the Sportsmanship Award that season and finished the season as second in the league in blocks per game.

Also, Derrick Pumaren was fired and Chot Reyes was appointed to be the head coach at the start of the Fiesta Conference, and Reyes booked his first win as head coach by defeating Welcoat Dragons by 36 points, 131-95. The two coaches are the top candidates to replace Joel Banal in 2006, ended up choosing Pumaren.

Also, import Terrence Leather was having an altercation with Jondan Salvador by throwing him a ball, and with James Yap, as Yap attempted to kick his leg from behind, but only jersey shorts was kicked, and Leather rushed through Yap, only stopped by Peek. Leather paid Php 62,400 fine with no suspension occurred.

== Key dates ==
- August 19: The 2007 PBA draft took place in Fort Bonifacio, Taguig.

== Draft picks ==
Air21 returned a draftpick to the Phone Pals (Yousif Aljamal).

== Roster ==
2007–08 Talk 'N Text Phone Pals roster
Players

Pos.	#	POB	Name	Height	Weight	DOB (YYYY–MM–DD)	From
PG	3	(United States)	Jimmy Alapag (C)	5 ft 9 in (1.75 m)	160 lb (73 kg)		Cal State San Bernardino
SF	4	(United States)	Harvey Carey	6 ft 3 in (1.91 m)	210 lb (95 kg)		Sonoma State
F	7	(United States)	Jay Washington	6 ft 7 in (2.01 m)			Eckerd
SG	9	(Philippines)	Mark Cardona	6 ft 1 in (1.85 m)	175 lb (79 kg)		De La Salle
SF	10	(Philippines)	Yousif Aljamal	6 ft 4 in (1.93 m)	190 lb (86 kg)		San Beda
F	11	(Philippines)	Kalani Ferreria	6 ft 3 in (1.91 m)
SG	14	(Philippines)	Ren-Ren Ritualo	6 ft 1 in (1.85 m)	160 lb (73 kg)		De La Salle
C	18	(Philippines)	Yancy de Ocampo	6 ft 9 in (2.06 m)	220 lb (100 kg)		Saint Francis of Assisi
SG	24	(Philippines)	Gec Chia	6 ft 2 in (1.88 m)	185 lb (84 kg)		Ateneo
F/C	41	(Philippines)	Don Allado	6 ft 6 in (1.98 m)	220 lb (100 kg)		De La Salle
G	42	(Philippines)	Donbel Belano	5 ft 8 in (1.73 m)	178 lb (81 kg)		Visayas
C	73	(United States)	Ali Peek	6 ft 4 in (1.93 m)	220 lb (100 kg)		Saint Mary's
C	98	(Philippines)	Gilbert Lao	6 ft 7 in (2.01 m)	210 lb (95 kg)		UST
		(Philippines)	JR Aquino	6 ft 2 in (1.88 m)	210 lb (95 kg)		UST

Coaches
Head coach
- (Philippines) Chot Reyes (Ateneo)
Assistant(s)
- Aboy Castro (Philippines)
- (Philippines) Nash Racela (Ateneo)
- (Philippines) Bong Ravena (UE)

Legend
- (DP) Unsigned draft pick
- (FA) Free agent
- (S) Suspended
- Injured

== Performance ==
=== Philippine Cup ===
==== Team standings ====
Pos	Team	W	L	PCT	GB	Qualification
1	Purefoods Tender Juicy Giants	12	6	.667 (Note: Head-to-head record: Purefoods 2–0 Sta. Lucia)	—	Advance to semifinals
2	Sta. Lucia Realtors	12	6	.667	—	Advance to semifinals
3	Alaska Aces	11	7	.611 (Note: Head-to-head record: Alaska 1–1 Red Bull (Alaska +29))	1	Advance to quarterfinals
4	Red Bull Barako	11	7	.611	1	Advance to quarterfinals
5	Magnolia Beverage Masters	10	8	.556	2	Advance to quarterfinals
6	Talk 'N Text Phone Pals	9	9	.500	3	Advance to wildcard round
7	Barangay Ginebra Kings	8	10	.444	4	Advance to wildcard round
8	Air21 Express	7	11	.389 (Note: Head-to-head record: Air21 2–0 Coca-Cola)	5	Advance to wildcard round
9	Coca-Cola Tigers	7	11	.389	5	Advance to wildcard round
10	Welcoat Dragons	3	15	.167	9	

==== Schedule ====
	Round 1									Round 2								
Team ╲ Game	1	2	3	4	5	6	7	8	9	10	11	12	13	14	15	16	17	18
Air21 Express	MBM	ALA	RBB	Coke	SLR	PF	BGK	TNT	RBB	WEL	BGK	ALA	PF	TNT	Coke	MBM	WEL	SLR
Alaska Aces	TNT	A21	Coke	BGK	WEL	MBM	RBB	PF	WEL	Coke	BGK	SLR	A21	SLR	MBM	RBB	TNT	PF
Barangay Ginebra Kings	RBB	TNT	WEL	ALA	PF	SLR	A21	MBM	Coke	WEL	ALA	A21	SLR	MBM	Coke	PF	RBB	TNT
Coca-Cola Tigers	WEL	ALA	MBM	A21	PF	SLR	TNT	BGK	ALA	SLR	RBB	MBM	WEL	BGK	A21	PF	RBB	TNT
Magnolia Beverage Masters	A21	SLR	PF	Coke	TNT	ALA	WEL	BGK	RBB	PF	TNT	RBB	Coke	BGK	ALA	A21	SLR	WEL
Purefoods Tender Juicy Giants	SLR	TNT	MBM	WEL	BGK	Coke	A21	RBB	ALA	SLR	MBM	TNT	WEL	A21	BGK	Coke	ALA	RBB
Red Bull Barako	BGK	WEL	A21	SLR	TNT	ALA	PF	MBM	TNT	A21	Coke	MBM	SLR	WEL	ALA	BGK	Coke	PF
Sta. Lucia Realtors	PF	MBM	TNT	RBB	A21	BGK	Coke	WEL	PF	Coke	ALA	BGK	RBB	ALA	TNT	WEL	MBM	A21
Talk 'N Text Phone Pals	ALA	PF	BGK	SLR	MBM	RBB	WEL	Coke	A21	RBB	MBM	PF	WEL	A21	SLR	ALA	BGK	Coke
Welcoat Dragons	Coke	RBB	BGK	PF	ALA	TNT	MBM	SLR	ALA	BGK	A21	PF	TNT	Coke	RBB	SLR	A21	MBM

= Win; = OT win; = Loss; = OT loss

==== Bracket ====
Wildcard phase (Single elimination)
6	Talk 'N Text	73
9	Coca-Cola	81
7	Brgy. Ginebra	110
8	Air21	119

Wildcard phase (Single elimination)
9	Coca-Cola	109
8	Air21	102

Quarterfinals (Best-of-3)
3	Alaska	2
9	Coca-Cola	0
4	Red Bull	2
5	Magnolia	0

Semifinals (Best-of-7)
3	Alaska	3
2	Sta. Lucia	4
1	Purefoods	4
4	Red Bull	3

Finals (Best-of-7)
2	Sta. Lucia	4
1	Purefoods	3
Third place
3	Alaska	104
4	Red Bull	125

==== Wildcard phase ====
===== First round =====
ABC

January 18

Coca-Cola Tigers 81, Talk 'N Text Phone Pals 73

Cuneta Astrodome, Pasay

=== Fiesta Conference ===
==== Team standings ====
Pos	Team	W	L	PCT	GB	Qualification
1	Air21 Express	12	6	.667	—	Advance to semifinals
2	Red Bull Barako	11	7	.611	1	Advance to semifinals
3	Barangay Ginebra Kings	10	8	.556 (Note: Head-to-head differential: Barangay Ginebra +14, Coca-Cola +4, Magnolia −18)	2	Advance to quarterfinals
4	Coca-Cola Tigers	10	8	.556	2	Advance to quarterfinals
5	Magnolia Beverage Masters	10	8	.556	2	Advance to quarterfinals
6	Alaska Aces	9	9	.500 (Note: Head-to-head record: Alaska 1–1 Talk 'N Text (Alaska +9))	3	Advance to wildcard round
7	Talk 'N Text Phone Pals	9	9	.500	3	Advance to wildcard round
8	Purefoods Tender Juicy Giants	8	10	.444	4	Advance to wildcard round
9	Sta. Lucia Realtors	7	11	.389	5	Advance to wildcard round
10	Welcoat Dragons	4	14	.222	8	

==== Schedule ====
	Round 1									Round 2								
Team ╲ Game	1	2	3	4	5	6	7	8	9	10	11	12	13	14	15	16	17	18
Air21 Express	WEL	RBB	PF	Coke	TNT	ALA	BGK	SLR	Coke	MBM	BGK	RBB	SLR	ALA	TNT	WEL	MBM	PF
Alaska Aces	SLR	BGK	MBM	WEL	RBB	A21	TNT	PF	Coke	RBB	TNT	PF	A21	WEL	SLR	Coke	MBM	BGK
Barangay Ginebra Kings	RBB	ALA	SLR	Coke	MBM	PF	A21	TNT	WEL	A21	MBM	RBB	SLR	PF	Coke	TNT	WEL	ALA
Coca-Cola Tigers	TNT	PF	WEL	A21	BGK	SLR	RBB	MBM	ALA	A21	RBB	WEL	PF	TNT	BGK	MBM	ALA	SLR
Magnolia Beverage Masters	PF	SLR	ALA	TNT	BGK	WEL	RBB	Coke	PF	A21	BGK	TNT	WEL	RBB	SLR	Coke	A21	ALA
Purefoods Tender Juicy Giants	MBM	Coke	A21	RBB	WEL	BGK	ALA	MBM	TNT	SLR	ALA	Coke	WEL	BGK	RBB	TNT	SLR	A21
Red Bull Barako	BGK	A21	TNT	PF	ALA	Coke	MBM	SLR	WEL	ALA	Coke	A21	BGK	MBM	PF	WEL	TNT	SLR
Sta. Lucia Realtors	ALA	MBM	BGK	TNT	Coke	WEL	RBB	A21	TNT	WEL	PF	A21	BGK	MBM	ALA	PF	Coke	RBB
Talk 'N Text Phone Pals	Coke	WEL	RBB	MBM	SLR	A21	ALA	WEL	BGK	SLR	PF	ALA	MBM	Coke	A21	PF	BGK	RBB
Welcoat Dragons	A21	TNT	Coke	ALA	PF	MBM	SLR	TNT	RBB	BGK	SLR	Coke	MBM	PF	ALA	A21	RBB	BGK

= Win; = OT win; = Loss; = OT loss

==== Bracket ====
Wildcard phase (Single elimination)
6	Alaska	85
9	Sta. Lucia	99
7	Talk 'N Text	98
8	Purefoods	83

Wildcard phase (Single elimination)
9	Sta. Lucia	111
7	Talk 'N Text	96

Quarterfinals (Best-of-3)
3	Brgy. Ginebra	2
9	Sta. Lucia	0
4	Coca-Cola	1
5	Magnolia	2

Semifinals (Best-of-7)
3	Brgy. Ginebra	4
2	Red Bull	0
1	Air21	4
5	Magnolia	2

Finals (Best-of-7)
3	Brgy. Ginebra	4
1	Air21	3
Third place
2	Red Bull	102
5	Magnolia	90

==== Wildcard phase ====
===== First round =====
ABC

July 9

Talk 'N Text Phone Pals 98, Purefoods Tender Juicy Giants 83

Ynares Center, Antipolo

===== Second round =====
ABC

July 11

Sta. Lucia Realtors 111, Talk 'N Text Phone Pals 96

Ynares Center, Antipolo

== Transactions ==
=== Trades ===
2008	To Talk 'N Text Phone Pals Ali Peek	To Coca-Cola Tigers Asi Taulava

March 2008	To Talk 'N Text Phone Pals Gilbert Lao, JR Aquino	To Barangay Ginebra Kings Chris Pacana, Victor Pablo

=== Free Agents ===
==== Additions ====
Player	Signed	New team
Kalani Ferreria	October	Barangay Ginebra Kings
Donbel Belano	October	Barako Bull Energy Boosters

=== Recruited imports ===
Name	Number	Duration
(United States) Aaron McGhee	3	March 29 vs. Coca-Cola
(United States) Terrence Leather	20	June 13 vs. Air21
