= 2007–08 Air21 Express season =

- Head coach: Bo Perasol
- Owner(s): Alberto "Bert" Lina

Philippine Cup results
- Record: 7–11 (38.9%)
- Place: 8th
- Playoff finish: 2nd Wildcard round (lost to Coca-Cola)

Fiesta Conference results
- Record: 12–6 (66.7%)
- Place: 1st
- Playoff finish: Fiesta finals (lost to Ginebra, 3–4)

Air21 Express seasons

The 2007–08 Air21 Express season was the 6th season of the franchise in the Philippine Basketball Association (PBA).

After drafting Ateneo stars on the draft day, Express finished in the Wildcard in the Philippine Cup. But a surprising and dominant in the Fiesta Conference, Express reached the PBA finals for the first time, only losing to Ginebra after having a 3–2 lead.

== Key dates ==
- August 19: The 2007 PBA draft took place in Fort Bonifacio, Taguig.

== Draft picks ==
Round	Pick	Player	Height	Position	Nationality	College
1	4	JC Intal	6'4"	SF	Philippines	Ateneo de Manila
1	5	Doug Kramer	6'4"	PF	Philippines	Ateneo de Manila
1	8	Yousif Aljamal	6'4"	SF / PF	Philippines	San Beda Manila
2	14	Marvin Cruz	5'8"	PG	Philippines	UP Diliman
2	20	RJ Masbang			Philippines	East

== Roster ==
2007–08 Air21 Express roster
Players

Pos.	#	POB	Name	Height	Weight	DOB (YYYY–MM–DD)	From
G	3	(Philippines)	Egay Billones	5 ft 9 in (1.75 m)			Centro Escolar Las Piñas
F	7	(Philippines)	JC Intal	6 ft 4 in (1.93 m)			Ateneo
F	9	(Philippines)	KG Canaleta	6 ft 6 in (1.98 m)			UE
F	10	(Philippines)	Gabby Espinas	6 ft 4 in (1.93 m)			Philippine Christian
G	12	(Philippines)	Marvin Cruz	5 ft 8 in (1.73 m)			UP Diliman
C	13	(Philippines)	Ervin Sotto	6 ft 7 in (2.01 m)			Saint Francis of Assisi
F/C	16	(Philippines)	Homer Se	6 ft 5 in (1.96 m)			San Sebastian
F	18	(Philippines)	Doug Kramer	6 ft 5 in (1.96 m)			Ateneo
G	19	(Philippines)	Wynne Arboleda (C)	5 ft 11 in (1.80 m)			MLQU
G	20	(Philippines)	Gary David	6 ft 2 in (1.88 m)			Lyceum
F	29	(Philippines)	Arwind Santos	6 ft 4 in (1.93 m)			Far Eastern
F	33	(Philippines)	Ranidel De Ocampo	6 ft 6 in (1.98 m)			Saint Francis of Assisi
F/C	55	(United States)	Steven Thomas (I)	6 ft 9 in (2.06 m)			Middle Tennessee

Coaches
Head coach
- (Philippines) Bo Perasol
Assistant(s)
- (Philippines) Leo Isaac
- (Philippines) Ricky Dandan
- (Philippines) Allan Grgegorio
- (Philippines) Johny Tam

Legend
- (DP) Unsigned draft pick
- (FA) Free agent
- (S) Suspended
- (I) Import
- Injured

== Philippine Cup ==
=== Eliminations ===
==== Standings ====
Pos	Team	W	L	PCT	GB	Qualification
1	Purefoods Tender Juicy Giants	12	6	.667 (Note: Head-to-head record: Purefoods 2–0 Sta. Lucia)	—	Advance to semifinals
2	Sta. Lucia Realtors	12	6	.667	—	Advance to semifinals
3	Alaska Aces	11	7	.611 (Note: Head-to-head record: Alaska 1–1 Red Bull (Alaska +29))	1	Advance to quarterfinals
4	Red Bull Barako	11	7	.611	1	Advance to quarterfinals
5	Magnolia Beverage Masters	10	8	.556	2	Advance to quarterfinals
6	Talk 'N Text Phone Pals	9	9	.500	3	Advance to wildcard round
7	Barangay Ginebra Kings	8	10	.444	4	Advance to wildcard round
8	Air21 Express	7	11	.389 (Note: Head-to-head record: Air21 2–0 Coca-Cola)	5	Advance to wildcard round
9	Coca-Cola Tigers	7	11	.389	5	Advance to wildcard round
10	Welcoat Dragons	3	15	.167	9	

=== Schedule ===
	Round 1									Round 2								
Team ╲ Game	1	2	3	4	5	6	7	8	9	10	11	12	13	14	15	16	17	18
Air21 Express	MBM	ALA	RBB	Coke	SLR	PF	BGK	TNT	RBB	WEL	BGK	ALA	PF	TNT	Coke	MBM	WEL	SLR
Alaska Aces	TNT	A21	Coke	BGK	WEL	MBM	RBB	PF	WEL	Coke	BGK	SLR	A21	SLR	MBM	RBB	TNT	PF
Barangay Ginebra Kings	RBB	TNT	WEL	ALA	PF	SLR	A21	MBM	Coke	WEL	ALA	A21	SLR	MBM	Coke	PF	RBB	TNT
Coca-Cola Tigers	WEL	ALA	MBM	A21	PF	SLR	TNT	BGK	ALA	SLR	RBB	MBM	WEL	BGK	A21	PF	RBB	TNT
Magnolia Beverage Masters	A21	SLR	PF	Coke	TNT	ALA	WEL	BGK	RBB	PF	TNT	RBB	Coke	BGK	ALA	A21	SLR	WEL
Purefoods Tender Juicy Giants	SLR	TNT	MBM	WEL	BGK	Coke	A21	RBB	ALA	SLR	MBM	TNT	WEL	A21	BGK	Coke	ALA	RBB
Red Bull Barako	BGK	WEL	A21	SLR	TNT	ALA	PF	MBM	TNT	A21	Coke	MBM	SLR	WEL	ALA	BGK	Coke	PF
Sta. Lucia Realtors	PF	MBM	TNT	RBB	A21	BGK	Coke	WEL	PF	Coke	ALA	BGK	RBB	ALA	TNT	WEL	MBM	A21
Talk 'N Text Phone Pals	ALA	PF	BGK	SLR	MBM	RBB	WEL	Coke	A21	RBB	MBM	PF	WEL	A21	SLR	ALA	BGK	Coke
Welcoat Dragons	Coke	RBB	BGK	PF	ALA	TNT	MBM	SLR	ALA	BGK	A21	PF	TNT	Coke	RBB	SLR	A21	MBM

= Win; = OT win; = Loss; = OT loss

=== Bracket ===
Wildcard phase (single elimination)
6	Talk 'N Text	73
9	Coca-Cola	81
7	Brgy. Ginebra	110
8	Air21	119

Wildcard phase (single elimination)
9	Coca-Cola	109
8	Air21	102

Quarterfinals (best-of-3)
3	Alaska	2
9	Coca-Cola	0
4	Red Bull	2
5	Magnolia	0

Semifinals (best-of-7)
3	Alaska	3
2	Sta. Lucia	4
1	Purefoods	4
4	Red Bull	3

Finals (best-of-7)
2	Sta. Lucia	4
1	Purefoods	3
Third place
3	Alaska	104
4	Red Bull	125

== Fiesta Conference ==
=== Eliminations ===
Pos	Team	W	L	PCT	GB	Qualification
1	Air21 Express	12	6	.667	—	Advance to semifinals
2	Red Bull Barako	11	7	.611	1	Advance to semifinals
3	Barangay Ginebra Kings	10	8	.556 (Note: Head-to-head differential: Barangay Ginebra +14, Coca-Cola +4, Magnolia −18)	2	Advance to quarterfinals
4	Coca-Cola Tigers	10	8	.556	2	Advance to quarterfinals
5	Magnolia Beverage Masters	10	8	.556	2	Advance to quarterfinals
6	Alaska Aces	9	9	.500 (Note: Head-to-head record: Alaska 1–1 Talk 'N Text (Alaska +9))	3	Advance to wildcard round
7	Talk 'N Text Phone Pals	9	9	.500	3	Advance to wildcard round
8	Purefoods Tender Juicy Giants	8	10	.444	4	Advance to wildcard round
9	Sta. Lucia Realtors	7	11	.389	5	Advance to wildcard round
10	Welcoat Dragons	4	14	.222	8	

=== Schedule ===
	Round 1									Round 2								
Team ╲ Game	1	2	3	4	5	6	7	8	9	10	11	12	13	14	15	16	17	18
Air21 Express	WEL	RBB	PF	Coke	TNT	ALA	BGK	SLR	Coke	MBM	BGK	RBB	SLR	ALA	TNT	WEL	MBM	PF
Alaska Aces	SLR	BGK	MBM	WEL	RBB	A21	TNT	PF	Coke	RBB	TNT	PF	A21	WEL	SLR	Coke	MBM	BGK
Barangay Ginebra Kings	RBB	ALA	SLR	Coke	MBM	PF	A21	TNT	WEL	A21	MBM	RBB	SLR	PF	Coke	TNT	WEL	ALA
Coca-Cola Tigers	TNT	PF	WEL	A21	BGK	SLR	RBB	MBM	ALA	A21	RBB	WEL	PF	TNT	BGK	MBM	ALA	SLR
Magnolia Beverage Masters	PF	SLR	ALA	TNT	BGK	WEL	RBB	Coke	PF	A21	BGK	TNT	WEL	RBB	SLR	Coke	A21	ALA
Purefoods Tender Juicy Giants	MBM	Coke	A21	RBB	WEL	BGK	ALA	MBM	TNT	SLR	ALA	Coke	WEL	BGK	RBB	TNT	SLR	A21
Red Bull Barako	BGK	A21	TNT	PF	ALA	Coke	MBM	SLR	WEL	ALA	Coke	A21	BGK	MBM	PF	WEL	TNT	SLR
Sta. Lucia Realtors	ALA	MBM	BGK	TNT	Coke	WEL	RBB	A21	TNT	WEL	PF	A21	BGK	MBM	ALA	PF	Coke	RBB
Talk 'N Text Phone Pals	Coke	WEL	RBB	MBM	SLR	A21	ALA	WEL	BGK	SLR	PF	ALA	MBM	Coke	A21	PF	BGK	RBB
Welcoat Dragons	A21	TNT	Coke	ALA	PF	MBM	SLR	TNT	RBB	BGK	SLR	Coke	MBM	PF	ALA	A21	RBB	BGK

= Win; = OT win; = Loss; = OT loss

=== Bracket ===
Wildcard phase (Single elimination)
6	Alaska	85
9	Sta. Lucia	99
7	Talk 'N Text	98
8	Purefoods	83

Wildcard phase (Single elimination)
9	Sta. Lucia	111
7	Talk 'N Text	96

Quarterfinals (Best-of-3)
3	Brgy. Ginebra	2
9	Sta. Lucia	0
4	Coca-Cola	1
5	Magnolia	2

Semifinals (Best-of-7)
3	Brgy. Ginebra	4
2	Red Bull	0
1	Air21	4
5	Magnolia	2

Finals (Best-of-7)
3	Brgy. Ginebra	4
1	Air21	3
Third place
2	Red Bull	102
5	Magnolia	90

==== Semifinals ====
Wins	Date	July 20	July 23	July 25	July 27	July 30	August 1
Wins		Game 1	Game 2	Game 3	Game 4	Game 5	Game 6
4	Air21 (1)	87	103	82	102	82	99
2	Magnolia (5)	113	102	78	104	72	91

==== Finals ====
Wins	Date	August 6	August 8	August 10	August 13	August 15	August 17	August 20
Wins		Game 1	Game 2	Game 3	Game 4	Game 5	Game 6	Game 7
3	Air21 (1)	96	124	97	77	76	75	84
4	Barangay Ginebra (3)	105	90	87	90	73	80	97

=== Notable events ===
- Air21 Express' Homer Se was fined P20,000 for a flagrant foul-penalty 1 on their game against the Sta. Lucia Realtors when he put up a fighting stance after the looseball scramble between Williams and Air21 guard Wynne Arboleda directed towards SLR rookie Ryan Reyes and import Jamar Brown.
