= Gec Chia =

Filipino basketball player (born 1979)

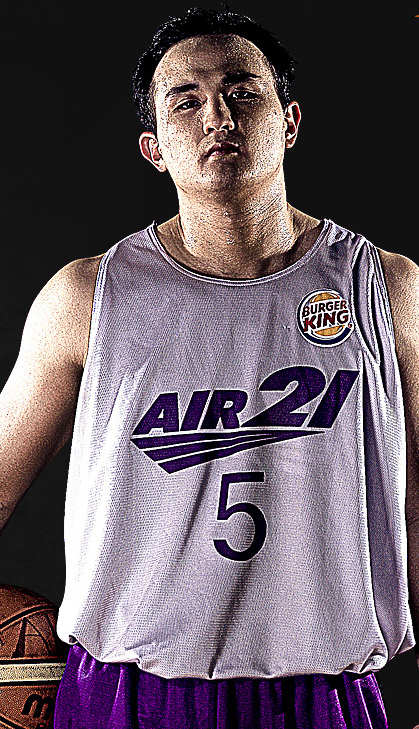
- Chia in 2007

Personal information
- Born: August 19, 1979 (age 47) Zamboanga City, Philippines
- Listed height: 6 ft 2 in (1.88 m)
- Listed weight: 185 lb (84 kg)

Career information
- High school: St. Joseph's (Zamboanga City)
- College: Ateneo
- PBA draft: 2003: 3rd round, 28th overall pick
- Drafted by: Coca-Cola Tigers
- Playing career: 2003–2010
- Position: Point guard / shooting guard

Career history
- 2003–2005: Coca-Cola Tigers
- 2005–2006: Barangay Ginebra Kings
- 2006–2008: Air21 Express
- 2008–2009: Talk 'N Text Tropang Texters
- 2009–2010: Barako Bull Energy Boosters

Career highlights
- 2× PBA champion (2003 Reinforced, 2008–09 Philippine); UAAP champion (2002); UAAP Most Improved Player (2002); 2× PBL champion (2002 Chairman's, 2006 Unity)

George Christian "Gec" T. Chia (born August 19, 1979) is a Filipino business executive and former professional basketball player. He played college basketball for the Ateneo Blue Eagles and is best known for making the buzzer-beating game-winning shot that sent Ateneo to the finals of UAAP Season 65.

== Amateur career ==
Chia was a major in computer science in Ateneo de Manila University, where he was an intramurals legend. He was noticed by then-coach Joe Lipa and was added to the Ateneo Blue Eagles' roster. He rode the bench for two years, substituting for players such as LA Tenorio and Wesley Gonzales. With the team failing to win the finals in the 2001 season, Ateneo fired Lipa and hired former Mapúa Cardinals coach Joel Banal. In the preseason, Ateneo won the PBL Chairman's Cup.

The Blue Eagles advanced to the playoffs in 2002 as the third seed after beating the rival De La Salle Green Archers in the end of the elimination round denying them of a 14–0 sweep. As the third seed, Ateneo had to beat #2 seed UE Red Warriors twice in the semifinals in order to advance to the finals. LA Tenorio, who had just returned from an injury, led the Eagles to a Game 1 triumph to set a winner-take-all game to face La Salle who had just eliminated the UST Growling Tigers.

With 7.8 seconds left in Game 2, and the score tied at 70–all, UE player Paul Artadi turned over the ball. Tenorio raced towards the other end of the court but was well covered by the bigger James Yap. Tenorio passed the ball to Chia, who shook off Ronald Tubid, and made the shot over the outstretched hands of Olan Omiping. The shot brought Banal to his knees and he later described the shot as "a miracle." With the win, Ateneo went to the finals against the Green Archers.

In the finals, Chia scored 5 points in a Game 1 win and had 11 points in Ateneo's title-clinching Game 3 win. That season, he was awarded as the league's Most Improved Player and graduated with an MA in computer science.

== Professional career ==
Chia was selected twenty-eighth overall in the 2003 PBA draft by the Coca-Cola Tigers. In 2003, they won the Reinforced Conference. He started one game when the PBA played a game in his hometown of Zamboanga.

When Chia's contract expired, he was released by Coca-Cola. He then returned to the PBL, joining the Harbour Centre Batang Pier and helping them win the PBL Unity Cup. He was later signed by the Barangay Ginebra Kings as a free agent.

Ginebra then traded Chia and Paolo Hubalde to the Air21 Express in a three-team trade. He had 13 points in a win over the Welcoat Dragons.

Chia was also part of the 2008-09 PBA Philippine Cup Talk 'N Text Tropang Texters champion team.

He then became a free agent, eventually being signed by the Barako Bull Energy Boosters early in the 2009–10 Philippine Cup. However, he only played six games with them, and was no longer with the team by the start of the following conference, the 2010 Fiesta Conference.

== Life after basketball ==
Chia is currently the managing director of Poliform, a company that produces high-end Italian modular home pieces in the Philippines. His wife is Poliform's marketing head.

== PBA career statistics ==
Legend
GP	Games played	MPG	Minutes per game
FG%	Field-goal percentage	3P%	3-point field-goal percentage	FT%	Free-throw percentage
RPG	Rebounds per game	APG	Assists per game	SPG	Steals per game
BPG	Blocks per game	PPG	Points per game	**Bold**	Career high

Year	Team	GP	MPG	FG%	3P%	FT%	RPG	APG	SPG	BPG	PPG
2003	Coca-Cola	18	6.7	.382	.000	**1.000**	1.0	.6	.1	0.0	2.6
2004–05	Coca-Cola	21	6.7	.316	.125	.800	1.5	.7	.3	0.0	2.0
2006–07	Barangay Ginebra	13	**19.5**	**.610**	.000	.680	**2.6**	2.2	.2	**0.1**	**6.9**
2007–08	Air21	**37**	12.1	.402	**.393**	.577	1.6	.9	**.4**	0.0	3.8
2007–08	Talk 'N Text	**37**	12.1	.402	**.393**	.577	1.6	.9	**.4**	0.0	3.8
2008–09	Talk 'N Text	1	1.0	—	.000	.000	.0	.0	.0	0.0	0.0
2009–10	Barako Bull	6	18.2	.310	.100	.500	2.5	**2.3**	.3	0.0	3.3
Career		96	11.2	.413	.302	.661	1.7	1.0	0.3	0.0	3.5
