= 2007–08 PBA season =

33rd PBA season

- Duration: October 14, 2007 – August 20, 2008
- Teams: 10
- TV partner(s): Local: ABC, TV5; International: The Filipino Channel

2007 PBA Draft
- Top draft pick: Joe Devance
- Picked by: Welcoat Dragons
- Season MVP: Kelly Williams (Sta. Lucia Realtors)
- Philippine Cup champions: Sta. Lucia Realtors
- Philippine Cup runners-up: Purefoods Tender Juicy Giants
- Fiesta Conference champions: Barangay Ginebra Kings
- Fiesta Conference runners-up: Air21 Express

Seasons
- ← 2006–07 2008–09 →

The 2007–08 PBA season was the 33rd season of the Philippine Basketball Association (PBA). The season was formally opened on October 14, 2007, at the Araneta Coliseum. The league started the season with the Philippine Cup, or the traditional All-Filipino Conference, while capping off the season with the import-laiden Fiesta Conference.

Renauld "Sonny" Barrios was appointed as commissioner while serving as an officer in charge of the league until a replacement for former commissioner Noli Eala will be found.

The first activity of the season was the 2007 PBA Draft last August 19 at the Market Market in Taguig.

== Board of governors ==
=== Executive committee ===
- Noli Eala (commissioner until August 7, 2007)
- Sonny Barrios (officer-in-charge starting August 8, 2008)
- Tony Chua (chairman, representing Red Bull Barako)
- Joaquin L. Trillo (vice-chairman, representing Alaska Aces)
- Robert Non (treasurer, representing Barangay Ginebra Kings)

=== Teams ===
Team	Company	Governor	Alternate governor
Air21 Express	Airfrieght 2100, Inc.	Angelito Alvarez	
Alaska Aces	Alaska Milk Corporation	Wilfred Steven Uytengsu	Joaquin Trillo
Barako Bull Energy	Photokina Marketing Corporation	Antonio Chua	Rafaelito Casyao
Barangay Ginebra Kings	Ginebra San Miguel, Inc.	Robert Non	Gerardo Payumo
Coca Cola Tigers	Coca-Cola Bottlers Philippines, Inc.	Jose Bayani Baylon	
Magnolia Beverage Masters	San Miguel Corporation	Roberto Huang	Eliezer Capacio
Purefoods Tender Juicy Giants	Purefoods Corporation	Rene Pardo	Francisco Alejo III
Sta. Lucia Realtors	Sta. Lucia Realty and Development Corporation	Manuel Encarnado	Ariel Salvador Magno
Talk 'N Text Phone Pals	Philippine Long Distance Telephone Company	Victorico Vargas	Ramoncito Fernandez
Welcoat Dragons	Asian Coatings Philippines, Inc.	Mamerto Mondragon	Carlo Quevada

== Pre-season events ==
- San Miguel Corporation changed the name of the San Miguel Beermen to the Magnolia Beverage Masters; "Magnolia" was their product name from 1985 to 1987.
- Gec Chia and Paolo Hubalde of the Barangay Ginebra Kings were traded to the Air21 Express for Paul Artadi who was traded by the Purefoods Tender Juicy Giants.
- Joseph Yeo of the Coca Cola Tigers and the team's 2009 second round draft pick rights were traded to the Sta. Lucia Realtors for Mark Isip and Cesar Catli.
- On October 3, Magnolia Beverage Masters' Danny Seigle and Brgy. Ginebra's Billy Mamaril had an altercation during a pre-season tune-up game at the Greenmeadows Gym. OIC Commissioner Sonny Barrios fined Seigle P10,000.
- New rules were approved in order to make the league rules more consistent to FIBA's rules rather than the National Basketball Association (NBA):
  - The controlled handcheck foul will be implemented.
  - The three-point arc would now be reset to 20 feet and 6 inches (FIBA standard) from 22 feet.
  - The key would now be trapezoidal (FIBA) instead of rectangular (NBA).
- With a change in their team name, Magnolia unveiled their new logo and uniforms, using the blue and white motif. Alaska replaced their red uniforms with their black alternates first used in the 2007 Fiesta Conference finals, while Purefoods replaced their navy blue dark uniforms with their red alternates from the 2007 Fiesta Conference. Red Bull introduced a new slightly-modified logo and uniforms, and Sta. Lucia slightly modified their old uniforms, adding a diagonal stripe on the shoulders.

== Opening ceremonies ==
The season began on October 14 with the Magnolia Beverage Masters defeating the Air21 Express, 121–112.

The muses for the participating teams are as follows:

Team	Muse
Air21 Express	Jean Harn
Alaska Aces	Phoemela Barranda
Barangay Ginebra Kings	Iwa Moto
Coca-Cola Tigers	Pokwang
Magnolia Beverage Masters	Juliana Rogatti
Purefoods Tender Juicy Giants	Kim Chiu
Red Bull Barako	Red Bull models (Idyll, Mica, Sheena and Thea)
Sta. Lucia Realtors	Maggie Wilson
Talk 'N Text Phone Pals	Marian Rivera
Welcoat Dragons	Kat Labung

== 2007–08 Philippine Cup ==
=== Notable events ===
- Red Bull Barako head coach Yeng Guiao was suspended for one game after verbally confronting league technical group chief Perry Martinez after their game against the Barangay Ginebra Kings. Serving the suspension against the Welcoat Dragons, assistant Gee Abanilla became the head coach for the game, in which Red Bull won.
- Purefoods Tender Juicy Giants point guard Roger Yap was suspended for one game after hitting LA Tenorio of the Magnolia Beverage Masters; he served the suspension against the Welcoat Dragons in which Purefoods won.
- In Welcoat Dragons' 126–125 overtime win against the Talk 'N Text Phone Pals, both teams converted 29 three-point field goals, a new PBA record.
- On November 26, the Talk 'N Text Phone Pals traded Asi Taulava to the Coca-Cola Tigers in exchange for Ali Peek and a first-round pick.
- Talk 'N Text Phone Pals players Mark Cardona and Harvey Carey were suspended after their altercation against Welcoat Dragon Jojo Tangkay. The two Phone Pals will be suspended on their game against the Air21 Express, while Carey would also be suspended on Talk 'N Text's game against the Sta. Lucia Realtors. Both Carey and Cardona were fined 20,000 pesos each. The case of Welcoat's Ryan Araña's flagrant foul on Asi Taulava on their loss against the Coca-Cola Tigers was deferred. Araña was later suspended on Welcoat's defeat against Red Bull Barako.
- The Air21 Express acquired Gabby Espinas from the Magnolia Beverage Masters in exchange for one of Air21's first round picks in the 2008 Draft.
- On January 17, 2008, the PBA Board of Governors named officer-in-charge Sonny Barrios as the new commissioner up to the end of the season after a deadlock ensued between governors that supported Atty. Chito Salud and Lambert Ramos. Barrios has yet to accept his appointment.
- Red Bull Barako's Carlo Sharma and Jondan Salvador of the Purefoods Tender Juicy Giants were suspended for one game after figuring in a fistfight which led to their ejection from the game. Aside from the suspension, Sharma was fined P25,000 while Salvador was fined P20,000. Sharma served his suspension on game 1 of their quarterfinals series against the Magnolia Beverage Masters, in which Red Bull won; Salvador will serve his suspension in game 1 of their semifinals series against Red Bull, in which Purefoods won.
- On January 24, Barrios accepted his appointment as commissioner.

=== Elimination round ===
Pos	Team	W	L	PCT	GB	Qualification
1	Purefoods Tender Juicy Giants	12	6	.667 (Note: Head-to-head record: Purefoods 2–0 Sta. Lucia)	—	Advance to semifinals
2	Sta. Lucia Realtors	12	6	.667	—	Advance to semifinals
3	Alaska Aces	11	7	.611 (Note: Head-to-head record: Alaska 1–1 Red Bull (Alaska +29))	1	Advance to quarterfinals
4	Red Bull Barako	11	7	.611	1	Advance to quarterfinals
5	Magnolia Beverage Masters	10	8	.556	2	Advance to quarterfinals
6	Talk 'N Text Phone Pals	9	9	.500	3	Advance to wildcard round
7	Barangay Ginebra Kings	8	10	.444	4	Advance to wildcard round
8	Air21 Express	7	11	.389 (Note: Head-to-head record: Air21 2–0 Coca-Cola)	5	Advance to wildcard round
9	Coca-Cola Tigers	7	11	.389	5	Advance to wildcard round
10	Welcoat Dragons	3	15	.167	9	

=== Playoffs ===
Wildcard phase (Single elimination)
6	Talk 'N Text	73
9	Coca-Cola	81
7	Brgy. Ginebra	110
8	Air21	119

Wildcard phase (Single elimination)
9	Coca-Cola	109
8	Air21	102

Quarterfinals (Best-of-3)
3	Alaska	2
9	Coca-Cola	0
4	Red Bull	2
5	Magnolia	0

Semifinals (Best-of-7)
3	Alaska	3
2	Sta. Lucia	4
1	Purefoods	4
4	Red Bull	3

Finals (Best-of-7)
2	Sta. Lucia	4
1	Purefoods	3
Third place
3	Alaska	104
4	Red Bull	125

==== Wildcard phase ====
===== First round =====
Team 1	Score	Team 2
(6) Talk 'N Text Phone Pals	73–81	(9) Coca-Cola Tigers
(7) Barangay Ginebra Kings	110–119	(8) Air21 Express

===== Second round =====
Team 1	Score	Team 2
(8) Air21 Express	102–109	(9) Coca-Cola Tigers

==== Quarterfinals ====
Team 1	Series	Team 2	Game 1	Game 2	Game 3
(3) Alaska Aces	2–0	(9) Coca-Cola Tigers	89–82	110–100	—
(4) Red Bull Barako	2–0	(5) Magnolia Beverage Masters	107–104	112–94	—

==== Semifinals ====
Team 1	Series	Team 2	Game 1	Game 2	Game 3	Game 4	Game 5	Game 6	Game 7
(1) Purefoods Tender Juicy Giants	4–3	(4) Red Bull Barako	103–84	89–93	99–90	88–97 (OT)	96–95	97–123	83–71
(2) Sta. Lucia Realtors	4–3	(3) Alaska Aces	94–107	86–77	91–82	80–93	96–90	87–106	92–84

==== Third place playoff ====
Team 1	Score	Team 2
(3) Alaska Aces	104–125	(4) Red Bull Barako

==== Finals ====
Team 1	Series	Team 2	Game 1	Game 2	Game 3	Game 4	Game 5	Game 6	Game 7
(1) Purefoods Tender Juicy Giants	3–4	(2) Sta. Lucia Realtors	97–109	101–112	118–107	106–98	76–88	89–81	88–100

- Finals MVP: Dennis Espino (Sta. Lucia)
- Best Player of the Conference: Kelly Williams (Sta. Lucia)

== Mid-season break ==
- The Coca Cola Tigers acquired Nic Belasco from the Welcoat Dragons in exchange for Mark Isip and Coke's 2010 and 2011 second round draft picks.
- Caloy Garcia was named as the new head coach of the Welcoat Dragons on March 18 after Leo Austria resigned from his post.
- On March 19, Mike Cortez and Ken Bono of the Alaska Aces were traded to the Magnolia Beverage Masters for LA Tenorio and Larry Fonacier.
- Purefoods Tender Juicy Giants' center Romel Adducul took a leave of absence after being diagnosed to be afflicted with nasopharyngeal cancer. This event triggered a four team trade between Purefoods, Magnolia, Coca-Cola and Barangay Ginebra. Magnolia dealt Enrico Villanueva and Willy Wilson to Coca-Cola in exchange for Chester Tolomia. Then Coke traded Villanueva to Purefoods for Marc Pingris. Pingris was then traded to Magnolia in exchange of the team's future draft pick and Wilson was sent to Barangay Ginebra in exchange for Mark Macapagal.

=== PBA Ateneo-La Salle Showdown ===
A game was held for the benefit of the PBA Players' Educational Trust Fund at the Araneta Coliseum featuring players from UAAP archrivals Ateneo and La Salle. Studio 23 aired the event with ABS-CBN Sports producing.

Studio 23

March 23

PBA–La Salle	90–90	PBA–Ateneo

Araneta Coliseum, Quezon City

== 2008 Fiesta Conference ==
=== Notable events ===
- Air21 Express' Homer Se was fined P20,000 for a flagrant foul-penalty 1 on their game against the Sta. Lucia Realtors when he put up a fighting stance after the looseball scramble between Williams and Air21 guard Wynne Arboleda directed towards SLR rookie Ryan Reyes and import Jamar Brown.

=== Elimination round ===
Pos	Team	W	L	PCT	GB	Qualification
1	Air21 Express	12	6	.667	—	Advance to semifinals
2	Red Bull Barako	11	7	.611	1	Advance to semifinals
3	Barangay Ginebra Kings	10	8	.556 (Note: Head-to-head differential: Barangay Ginebra +14, Coca-Cola +4, Magnolia −18)	2	Advance to quarterfinals
4	Coca-Cola Tigers	10	8	.556	2	Advance to quarterfinals
5	Magnolia Beverage Masters	10	8	.556	2	Advance to quarterfinals
6	Alaska Aces	9	9	.500 (Note: Head-to-head record: Alaska 1–1 Talk 'N Text (Alaska +9))	3	Advance to wildcard round
7	Talk 'N Text Phone Pals	9	9	.500	3	Advance to wildcard round
8	Purefoods Tender Juicy Giants	8	10	.444	4	Advance to wildcard round
9	Sta. Lucia Realtors	7	11	.389	5	Advance to wildcard round
10	Welcoat Dragons	4	14	.222	8	

=== Playoffs ===
Wildcard phase (Single elimination)
6	Alaska	85
9	Sta. Lucia	99
7	Talk 'N Text	98
8	Purefoods	83

Wildcard phase (Single elimination)
9	Sta. Lucia	111
7	Talk 'N Text	96

Quarterfinals (Best-of-3)
3	Brgy. Ginebra	2
9	Sta. Lucia	0
4	Coca-Cola	1
5	Magnolia	2

Semifinals (Best-of-7)
3	Brgy. Ginebra	4
2	Red Bull	0
1	Air21	4
5	Magnolia	2

Finals (Best-of-7)
3	Brgy. Ginebra	4
1	Air21	3
Third place
2	Red Bull	102
5	Magnolia	90

==== Wildcard phase ====
===== First round =====
Team 1	Score	Team 2
(6) Alaska Aces	86–99	(9) Sta. Lucia Realtors
(7) Talk 'N Text Phone Pals	98–83	(8) Purefoods Tender Juicy Giants

===== Second round =====
Team 1	Score	Team 2
(7) Talk 'N Text Phone Pals	96–111	(9) Sta. Lucia Realtors

==== Quarterfinals ====
Team 1	Series	Team 2	Game 1	Game 2	Game 3
(3) Barangay Ginebra Kings	2–0	(9) Sta. Lucia Realtors	92–90	113–85	—
(4) Coca-Cola Tigers	1–2	(5) Magnolia Beverage Masters	96–108	91–90	60–78

==== Semifinals ====
Team 1	Series	Team 2	Game 1	Game 2	Game 3	Game 4	Game 5	Game 6	Game 7
(1) Air21 Express	4–2	(4) Magnolia Beverage Masters	87–113	103–102	82–78	102–104	82–72	99–91	—
(2) Red Bull Barako	0–4	(3) Barangay Ginebra Kings	82–108	104–111	91–94	97–101 (OT)	—	—	—

==== Third place playoff ====
Team 1	Score	Team 2
(2) Red Bull Barako	102–90	(5) Magnolia Beverage Masters

==== Finals ====
Team 1	Series	Team 2	Game 1	Game 2	Game 3	Game 4	Game 5	Game 6	Game 7
(1) Air21 Express	3–4	(3) Barangay Ginebra Kings	96–105	124–90	97–87	77–90	76–73	75–80	84–97

- Finals MVP: Ronald Tubid and Eric Menk (Barangay Ginebra)
- Best Player of the Conference: Jayjay Helterbrand (Barangay Ginebra)
- Best Import of the Conference: Chris Alexander (Barangay Ginebra)

== 2008 PBA All-Star Weekend ==
The 2008 PBA All-Star Weekend was held from April 25 to 27 at Bacolod, Negros Occidental. The winners were:

- Three-point Shootout: Renren Ritualo (Talk 'N Text Phone Pals)
- Slam Dunk Competition: Kelly Williams (Sta. Lucia Realtors)
- Legends Shootout: Active players – John Arigo (Coca Cola Tigers), Dondon Hontiveros (Magnolia Beverage Masters), Renren Ritualo (Talk 'N Text Phone Pals)

=== Rookie-Sophomore Blitz Game ===
ABC

April 25

Rookies 101, Sophomores 97

West Negros University Gym, Bacolod

- Blitz Game MVP: Ronjay Buenafe (Rookies)

=== All-Star Game ===
ABC

April 27
6:30 p.m.

North All-Stars 158, South All-Stars 163 (OT)
Scoring by quarter: 41–41, 37–38, 36–34, 35–34, Overtime: 14–9
Pts: Mark Caguioa 24	Pts: Peter June Simon 29

West Negros University Gym, Bacolod
Attendance: 4,000+

- All-Star Game MVP: Peter June Simon (South All-Stars)

== Awards ==
- Most Valuable Player: Kelly Williams (Sta. Lucia)
- Rookie of the Year: Ryan Reyes (Sta. Lucia)
- First Mythical Team:
  - Mark Caguioa (Brgy. Ginebra)
  - Jayjay Helterbrand (Brgy. Ginebra)
  - Arwind Santos (Air21)
  - Asi Taulava (Coca-Cola)
  - Kelly Williams (Sta. Lucia)
- Second Mythical Team:
  - Cyrus Baguio (Red Bull)
  - Willie Miller (Alaska)
  - Kerby Raymundo (Purefoods)
  - Nelbert Omolon (Sta. Lucia)
  - Sonny Thoss (Alaska)
- All-Defensive Team:
  - Kelly Williams (Sta. Lucia)
  - Ryan Reyes (Sta. Lucia)
  - Arwind Santos (Air21)
  - Marc Pingris (Magnolia)
  - Wynne Arboleda(Air21)
- Most Improved Player: Cyrus Baguio (Red Bull)
- Sportsmanship Award: Ali Peek (Talk 'N Text)

=== Awards given by the PBA Press Corps ===
- Coach of the Year: Boyet Fernandez (Sta. Lucia)
- Mr. Quality Minutes: Peter June Simon (Purefoods)
- Comeback Player of the Year: Mike Hrabak (Red Bull)
- Referee of the Year: Jess Fernandez
- All-Rookie Team
  - Ryan Reyes (Sta. Lucia)
  - Chico Lañete (Purefoods)
  - Joe Devance (Welcoat)
  - Doug Kramer (Air21)
  - Ronjay Buenafe (Coca-Cola)

== Cumulative standings ==
Pos	Team	Pld	W	L	PCT	Best finish
1	Red Bull Barako	51	29	22	.569	Third place
2	Barangay Ginebra Kings	50	28	22	.560	Champions
3	Sta. Lucia Realtors	54	29	25	.537	Champions
4	Air21 Express	51	27	24	.529	Finalist
5	Purefoods Tender Juicy Giants	51	27	24	.529	Finalist
6	Alaska Aces	47	25	22	.532	Semifinalist
7	Magnolia Beverage Masters	48	24	24	.500	Semifinalist
8	Talk 'N Text Phone Pals	39	19	20	.487	Wildcard phase
9	Coca-Cola Tigers	43	20	23	.465	Quarterfinalist
10	Welcoat Dragons	36	7	29	.194	Elimination round

=== Elimination rounds ===
Pos	Team	Pld	W	L	PCT
1	Red Bull Barako	36	22	14	.611
2	Magnolia Beverage Masters	36	20	16	.556
3	Purefoods Tender Juicy Giants	36	20	16	.556
4	Alaska Aces	36	20	16	.556
5	Air21 Express	36	19	17	.528
6	Sta. Lucia Realtors	36	19	17	.528
7	Talk 'N Text Phone Pals	36	18	18	.500
8	Barangay Ginebra Kings	36	18	18	.500
9	Coca-Cola Tigers	36	17	19	.472
10	Welcoat Dragons	36	7	29	.194

=== Playoffs ===
Pos	Team	Pld	W	L
1	Barangay Ginebra Kings	14	10	4
2	Sta. Lucia Realtors	18	10	8
3	Air21 Express	15	8	7
4	Purefoods Tender Juicy Giants	15	7	8
5	Red Bull Barako	15	7	8
6	Alaska Aces	11	5	6
7	Magnolia Beverage Masters	12	4	8
8	Coca-Cola Tigers	7	3	4
9	Talk 'N Text Phone Pals	3	1	2
10	Welcoat Dragons	0	0	0
