= UAAP Season 65 men's basketball tournament =

Basketball competition in the Philippines

UAAP Season 65
- Host school: National University
Men's Finals	G1	G2	G3	Wins
De La Salle Green Archers	70	85	70	1
Ateneo Blue Eagles	72	77	77	2
- Duration: September 26 to October 5
- Arena(s): Araneta Coliseum
- Finals MVP: Larry Fonacier and Wesley Gonzales (co-winners)
- Winning coach: Joel Banal
- Semifinalists: UE Red Warriors; UST Growling Tigers
- TV network(s): Studio 23 and TFC

The UAAP Season 65 men's basketball tournament refers to the men's basketball tournament of UAAP Season 65 (2002–03 season) of the University Athletic Association of the Philippines (UAAP). The tournament was hosted by National University. ABS-CBN covered the games on Studio 23.

Four-time defending champion De La Salle Green Archers were on their way on scoring a rare 14–0 sweep of the elimination round when they were stopped by the Ateneo Blue Eagles in their last game of the elimination round. The UE Red Warriors won over the UST Growling Tigers on the elimination round finale to secure the #2 seed against Ateneo in the semifinals. UST were blown out by La Salle in their semifinals series, while Ateneo won twice against UE, the deciding game via last-second shot from Gec Chia, to face La Salle in the Finals, a rematch of the previous season's championship series. In Game 1, Ateneo upset the Green Archers, but La Salle tied the series on the next game. In the deciding Game 3, Ateneo pulled away late in the fourth quarter to win their first title since 1988.

Ateneo's Enrico Villanueva was named Most Valuable Player, while teammates Larry Fonacier and Wesley Gonzales were named co-MVPs of the Finals.

== Coaches ==
=== Current coaches ===
- Adamson Soaring Falcons – Luigi Trillo
- Ateneo Blue Eagles – Joel Banal
- De La Salle Green Archers – Franz Pumaren
- FEU Tamaraws – Koy Banal
- NU Bulldogs – Manny Dandan
- UE Red Warriors – Boyzie Zamar
- UP Fighting Maroons – Allan Gregorio
- UST Growling Tigers – Aric del Rosario

=== Coaching changes ===
Team	Outgoing coach	Replaced by
Ateneo Blue Eagles	Joe Lipa	Joel Banal
UP Fighting Maroons	Ryan Gregorio	Allan Gregorio

== Elimination round ==
Pos	Team	W	L	PCT	GB	Qualification
1	De La Salle Green Archers	13	1	.929	—	Twice-to-beat in the semifinals
2	UE Red Warriors	10	4	.714	3	Twice-to-beat in the semifinals
3	Ateneo Blue Eagles	9	5	.643	4	Twice-to-win in the semifinals
4	UST Growling Tigers	8	6	.571	5	Twice-to-win in the semifinals
5	FEU Tamaraws	6	8	.429	7	
6	UP Fighting Maroons	5	9	.357	8	
7	Adamson Falcons	3	11	.214	10	
8	NU Bulldogs (H)	2	12	.143	11	

Rules for classification: 1) winning percentage; 2) if tied for top 4 seeds, one-game playoff; 3) head-to-head record; 4) head-to-head point differential; 5) overall point differential
(H) Hosts

With a 14–0 sweep giving them a bye up to the best-of-3 finals, La Salle won their first thirteen games; their last game was against arch rival Ateneo. The two teams were locked 43–all when Wesley Gonzales, Rich Alvarez, Larry Fonacier and Andrew Cruz engineered a 21–3 run to put Ateneo up 64–46 with eight minutes left in the fourth quarter. Alvarez scored on a slam dunk to give Ateneo the biggest lead of the game, 73–53 with 3:13 left. Ateneo's lead would be insurmountable as they prevented the sweep and moved to second place. UE won over UST 76–69 to seize the #2 seed and the twice to beat advantage against Ateneo; UST will face La Salle in the other semifinal pairing.

=== Match-up results ===
	Round 1							Round 2						
Team ╲ Game	1	2	3	4	5	6	7	8	9	10	11	12	13	14
Adamson	UST school colors	NU school colors	UE school colors	FEU school colors	Ateneo school colors	La Salle school colors	UP school colors	La Salle school colors	NU school colors	UST school colors	UP school colors	UE school colors	Ateneo school colors	FEU school colors
Ateneo	NU school colors	UST school colors	FEU school colors	UP school colors	UE school colors	Adamson school colors	La Salle school colors	FEU school colors	UE school colors	NU school colors	UST school colors	UP school colors	Adamson school colors	La Salle school colors
La Salle	FEU school colors	UE school colors	NU school colors	UST school colors	UP school colors	Adamson school colors	Ateneo school colors	Adamson school colors	UST school colors	NU school colors	UE school colors	FEU school colors	UP school colors	Ateneo school colors
FEU	La Salle school colors	UP school colors	Ateneo school colors	Adamson school colors	UST school colors	UE school colors	NU school colors	Ateneo school colors	UP school colors	UE school colors	NU school colors	La Salle school colors	UST school colors	Adamson school colors
NU	Ateneo school colors	Adamson school colors	La Salle school colors	UE school colors	UST school colors	UP school colors	FEU school colors	UST school colors	Adamson school colors	La Salle school colors	Ateneo school colors	FEU school colors	UE school colors	UP school colors
UE	UP school colors	La Salle school colors	Adamson school colors	NU school colors	Ateneo school colors	FEU school colors	UST school colors	UP school colors	Ateneo school colors	FEU school colors	La Salle school colors	Adamson school colors	NU school colors	UST school colors
UP	UE school colors	FEU school colors	UST school colors	Ateneo school colors	La Salle school colors	NU school colors	Adamson school colors	UE school colors	FEU school colors	Adamson school colors	Ateneo school colors	UST school colors	La Salle school colors	NU school colors
UST	Adamson school colors	Ateneo school colors	UP school colors	La Salle school colors	FEU school colors	NU school colors	UE school colors	NU school colors	La Salle school colors	Adamson school colors	Ateneo school colors	UP school colors	FEU school colors	UE school colors

= Win; = OT win; = Loss; = OT loss

=== Scores ===
Results on top and to the right of the dashes are for first-round games; those to the bottom and to the left of it are second-round games.

Teams	AdU	AdMU	DLSU	FEU	NU	UE	UP	UST
Adamson Soaring Falcons	—	73–79	67–74	76–49	82–80	79–84**	61–59	61–74
Ateneo Blue Eagles	97–67	—	60–70	73–68*	82–77	73–76	49–53	95–85
De La Salle Green Archers	91–64	63–76	—	85–71	76–72	81–72	71–67	81–76
FEU Tamaraws	84–78	93–92*	79–83	—	87–85	58–65	65–52	80–85
NU Bulldogs	98–92	79–90	100–104	68–95	—	75–79	72–80	84–85
UE Red Warriors	97–88	97–96*	85–92	80–75	68–69	—	54–59	90–87
UP Fighting Maroons	67–65	74–87	78–79	61–77	83–67	71–74	—	75–92
UST Growling Tigers	92–88	64–65	89–91*	62–61	82–79	69–76	89–83	—

Source: Philippine Daily Inquirer
Legend: Blue = left column team win; Red = top row team win.
Matches with lighter background shading were decided after overtime.

== Bracket ==
Semifinals (Top 2 twice-to-beat)
1	La Salle	97
4	UST	84
2	UE	78	70
3	Ateneo	84	72

Finals (Best-of-three playoff)
1	La Salle	70	85	70
3	Ateneo	72	77	77

== Semifinals ==
La Salle and UE have the twice-to-beat advantage. They only have to win once, while their opponents, twice, to progress.

=== (1) La Salle vs. (4) UST ===
Studio 23

September 19
2:00 p.m.

De La Salle Green Archers	97–84	UST Growling Tigers
Scoring by quarter: 30–14, 22–19, 20–19, 25–32
Pts: Mark Cardona 28		Pts: Cyrus Baguio 18
La Salle wins series in one game

Araneta Coliseum, Quezon City

La Salle, led by Mark Cardona and BJ Manalo, opened a 30–14 lead in the first quarter and never relinquished the lead. The lead reached 26 points in the third quarter. The Tigers cut the lead to 59–72 with a 7–0 run at the start of the fourth quarter, and another time, this time with an 11-point lead with a 78–89 scoreline, but La Salle's lead was too big for the Tigers to overcome.

=== (2) UE vs. (3) Ateneo ===
==== Game 1 ====
Studio 23

September 19
4:00 p.m.

UE Red Warriors	78–84	Ateneo Blue Eagles
Scoring by quarter: 18–15, 19–21, 15–25, 26–23
Pts: Paul Artadi 17; Rebs: Jay-arr Estrada 10; Asts: Paul Artadi 5		Pts: Alvarez, Tenorio 17 each Rebs: 3 players, 5 each Asts: Larry Fonacier 6
Ateneo extends series

Araneta Coliseum, Quezon City

Ateneo defeated UE to extend their series to a deciding second game. While Most Valuable Player (MVP) candidate James Yap was limited to only four points by the Ateneo defense, returning LA Tenorio (who was previously injured with a hand injury) led the decisive run that increased Ateneo's lead to 11 points to prevent their elimination.

==== Game 2 ====
Studio 23

September 22
4:00 p.m.

UE Red Warriors	70–72	Ateneo Blue Eagles
Scoring by quarter: 13–17, 16–15, 25–24, 16–16
Pts: Ronald Tubid 22		Pts: Enrico Villanueva 19
Ateneo wins series in two games

Araneta Coliseum, Quezon City

The deciding game would also go down to the wire; Gec Chia turned over the ball to UE, where James Yap converted at the other end to put the Red Warriors up, 70–68. Chia would later score to force the game's seventh and last deadlock with 35 seconds left. Yap missed a three-pointer on the ensuing possession, Jay-arr Estrada grabbed the rebound but Paul Artadi committed a turnover. With Ateneo now having the possession with 7.8 seconds remaining, LA Tenorio dribbled the entire length of the court to find his path blocked by two UE players. Off a pick from Enrico Villanueva, Chia scored a 15-foot jump shot to win the game for Ateneo and eliminate UE from contention.

== Finals ==
=== Game 1 ===
Studio 23

September 26
4:00 p.m.

De La Salle Green Archers	70–72	Ateneo Blue Eagles
Scoring by quarter: 28–23, 12–16, 18–13, 12–20
Pts: Mike Cortez 19; Rebs: Cardona, Cortez 5 each Asts: Mike Cortez 9		Pts: Enrico Villanueva 19; Rebs: Enrico Villanueva 11; Asts: Alvarez, Fonacier 6 each
Ateneo leads series 1–0

Araneta Coliseum, Quezon City

Ateneo kept pace with La Salle throughout much of the game, with the Green Archers leading by as much as eight and the Eagles giving up hairline leads. Late in the game, LA Tenorio missed both free-throws, but drew an offensive foul from Mike Cortez to give Ateneo the possession with 39.3 seconds left. Rich Alvarez missed consecutive shots, but Enrico Villanueva split his free-throws to put Ateneo up by two points with 9.2 seconds remaining. In the ensuing possession, Mark Cardona attempted a field goal twice but was blocked each time by Larry Fonacier as time expired to give Ateneo a 1–0 series lead.

=== Game 2 ===
Studio 23

September 29
4:00 p.m.

De La Salle Green Archers	85–77	Ateneo Blue Eagles
Scoring by quarter: 25–22, 27–12, 12–21, 21–22
Pts: Mike Cortez 21; Rebs: Adonis Santa Maria 14; Asts: Mike Cortez 7		Pts: Larry Fonacier 25; Rebs: Enrico Villanueva 8 Asts: LA Tenorio 6
Series tied 1–1

Araneta Coliseum, Quezon City

After the first game, La Salle coach Franz Pumaren talked to Mike Cortez where he reminded him that as a veteran, he should lead by example to his teammates. La Salle started strongly, leading 50–32, capped off a slam dunk from Cortez off an Ateneo turnover. The Blue Eagles will cut the deficit to nine points at 64–55, but Cortez scored each time to prevent Ateneo from cutting the lead even further. With La Salle up 78–73, Fonacier scored on a put-back; Adonis Sta. Maria scored at the other end to restore the 5-point lead, with 65 seconds left. Enrico Villanueva scored via two free-throws, but Carlo Sharma scored two points also from the free-throw line. LA Tenorio drove hard to the basket but missed; Santa Maria was fouled on the rebound attempt. Santa Maria made both free-throws, Cortez caught the airball from Fonacier's three-pointer, was fouled, and split his free-throws to end the game. La Salle evened the series and forced a deciding game off Cortez' 21 points.

=== Game 3 ===
Studio 23

October 5
4:00 p.m.

De La Salle Green Archers	70–77	Ateneo Blue Eagles
Scoring by quarter: 17–23, 20–19, 15–14, 18–21
Pts: BJ Manalo 19; Rebs: Adonis Santa Maria 11		Pts: Gonzales, Villanueva 16 each Rebs: Wesley Gonzales 12
Ateneo wins series 2–1

Araneta Coliseum, Quezon City

- Finals Most Valuable Player: co-awardees, Larry Fonacier and Wesley Gonzales (Ateneo Blue Eagles)

Ateneo led for much of the game via small margins, when LA Tenorio made successive three-point shots and Wesley Gonzales made a lay-up to give Ateneo a 10-point 64–54 lead; the two players would later leave the game due to fouls for the former and cramps from the latter. Sonny Tadeo and Epok Quimpo scored on a 5-point run to add Ateneo's lead to eleven points with barely over two minutes left. Adonis Santa Maria narrowed the gap to 66–73 but Villanueva made it a 9-point lead after being fouled by Santa Maria during a rebound play off Fonacier's miss. Santa Maria and BJ Manalo scored a 4–0 run, but Fonacier scored on the free-throw line off a Cortez to foul to win the championship for Ateneo, their first since their consecutive title run from 1987 to 1988, and denying La Salle to set a new record of a 5th-consecutive men's title in the Final Four era, a feat later achieved by Ateneo 10 years later.

== Broadcast notes ==
=== UAAP Final Four ===
September 19, 2002

Game	Play-by-play	Analyst	Courtside reporters	Team
Game 1	Jude Turcuato	Danny Francisco	Agnes Tapia (DLSU) and Dimples Romana (UST)	DLSU vs. UST
Game 1	Mico Halili	Randy Sacdalan	Vanessa Febre (UE) and Patty Laurel (ADMU)	UE vs. ADMU

September 22, 2002

Game	Play-by-play	Analyst	Courtside reporters	Team
Game 2	Jude Turcuato	Danny Francisco	Patty Laurel (ADMU) and Vanessa Febre (UE)	ADMU vs. UE

=== UAAP Finals ===
Game	Play-by-play	Analyst	Courtside reporters
Game 1	Mico Halili	Danny Francisco	Patty Laurel (ADMU) and Agnes Tapia (DLSU)
Game 2	Jude Turcuato	Randy Sacdalan	Agnes Tapia (DLSU) and Patty Laurel (ADMU)
Game 3	Mico Halili	Randy Sacdalan, Koy Banal and Aric del Rosario	Patty Laurel (ADMU) and Agnes Tapia (DLSU)

== Awards ==
The awards were given out prior to Game 2 at the Araneta Coliseum:

- Most Valuable Player: Enrico Villanueva (Ateneo Blue Eagles)
- Rookie of the Year: Arwind Santos (FEU Tamaraws)
- Mythical Five:
  - Mike Cortez (De La Salle Green Archers)
  - James Yap (UE Red Warriors)
  - Enrico Villanueva (Ateneo Blue Eagles)
  - Rich Alvarez (Ateneo Blue Eagles)
  - Cyrus Baguio (UST Growling Tigers)
- Most Improved Player: Gec Chia (Ateneo Blue Eagles)

== See also ==
- NCAA Season 78 basketball tournaments

Preceded by Season 64 (2001)	UAAP men's basketball seasons Season 65 (2002) basketball	Succeeded by Season 66 (2003)
