= Cesar Catli =

Filipino basketball player

Personal information
- Born: December 6, 1982 (age 43) Manolo Fortich, Bukidnon, Philippines
- Listed height: 6 ft 3 in (1.91 m)
- Listed weight: 185 lb (84 kg)

Career information
- High school: UV (Cebu City)
- College: FEU
- PBA draft: 2005: 2nd round, 10th overall pick
- Drafted by: Sta. Lucia Realtors
- Playing career: 2005–2010, 2018–2019
- Position: Shooting guard

Career history
- 2005–2007: Sta. Lucia Realtors
- 2007–2010: Coca-Cola Tigers
- 2018–2019: Cebu City Sharks

Cesar Ruba Catli Jr. is a Filipino former professional basketball player. He last played for the Cebu City Sharks of the Maharlika Pilipinas Basketball League (MPBL). He was picked by the Sta. Lucia Realtors tenth overall in the 2005 PBA draft.

== PBA career statistics ==
Legend
GP	Games played	MPG	Minutes per game
FG%	Field-goal percentage	3P%	3-point field-goal percentage	FT%	Free-throw percentage
RPG	Rebounds per game	APG	Assists per game	SPG	Steals per game
BPG	Blocks per game	PPG	Points per game	**Bold**	Career high

=== Season-by-season averages ===
Year	Team	GP	MPG	FG%	3P%	FT%	RPG	APG	SPG	BPG	PPG
2005–06	Sta. Lucia	37	15.1	.324	.291	.700	1.8	.4	.3	.1	4.0
2006–07	Sta. Lucia	**39**	9.3	.328	**.319**	.714	1.4	.1	.2	.1	3.0
2007–08	Coca-Cola	27	**18.0**	**.374**	.316	**.733**	**2.9**	.4	.3	.1	**6.7**
2008–09	Coca-Cola	14	15.3	.333	.315	.000	2.7	**.5**	.1	.1	4.2
2009–10	Coca-Cola	5	16.6	.182	.000	.000	1.8	.0	**.4**	**.2**	1.6
Career		122	14.0	.336	.301	.676	2.0	.3	.3	.1	4.2
