= 2007–08 Purefoods Tender Juicy Giants season =

- Head coach: Ryan Gregorio
- General Manager: Alvin Patrimonio

Philippine Cup results
- Record: 19–13 (59.4%)
- Place: 2nd
- Playoff finish: Runner-up (lost to Sta.Lucia)

Fiesta Conference results
- Record: 8–11 (42.1%)
- Place: 9th
- Playoff finish: Wildcard (lost to TNT)

Purefoods Tender Juicy Giants seasons

The 2007–08 Purefoods Tender Juicy Giants season was the 20th season of the franchise in the Philippine Basketball Association (PBA).

== Key dates ==
August 19: The 2007 PBA Draft took place at Market! Market! in Bonifacio Global City, Taguig.

== Roster ==
2007–08 Purefoods Tender Juicy Giants roster
Players

Pos.	#	POB	Name	Height	Weight	DOB (YYYY–MM–DD)	From
G	1	(Philippines)	Chico Lanete	6 ft 0 in (1.83 m)			Lyceum
C	5	(Philippines)	Jondan Salvador	6 ft 5 in (1.96 m)			St. Benilde
F	7	(Philippines)	Rey Evangelista	6 ft 3 in (1.91 m)			UST
G	8	(Philippines)	Peter June Simon	6 ft 1 in (1.85 m)			Mindanao
F	9	(Philippines)	Robert Sanz	6 ft 3 in (1.91 m)			Philippine Christian
C	10	(Philippines)	Rommel Adducul ( (injured) )	6 ft 6 in (1.98 m)			San Sebastian
G	13	(Philippines)	Roger Yap	6 ft 0 in (1.83 m)			USJ–R
C	14	(Philippines)	Enrico Villanueva	6 ft 6 in (1.98 m)			Ateneo
G	18	(Philippines)	James Yap	6 ft 3 in (1.91 m)			UE
F	20	(Philippines)	Ardy Larong	6 ft 2 in (1.88 m)			USJ–R
F	21	(Philippines)	Kerby Raymundo (C)	6 ft 6 in (1.98 m)			Letran
G	24	(United States)	Brandon Cablay	6 ft 0 in (1.83 m)			Vanguard
F	28	(Philippines)	Richard Yee	6 ft 4 in (1.93 m)			UST
G	40	(United States)	Noy Castillo	6 ft 0 in (1.83 m)			The Citadel
C	23	(United States)	Darius Rice (I)	6 ft 10 in (2.08 m)			Miami (FL)
C	55	(Morocco)	Reda Rhalimi (I)	6 ft 10 in (2.08 m)			Saint Mary's

Coaches
Head coach
- (Philippines) Ryan Gregorio
Assistant(s)
- (Philippines) Koy Banal
- (Philippines) Ronnie Magsanoc
- (Philippines) Dayong Mendoza

Legend
- (DP) Unsigned draft pick
- (FA) Free agent
- (S) Suspended
- (I) Import
- Injured

== Philippine Cup ==
=== Team standings ===
#	2007-08 PBA Philippine Cup					
#	Team	W	L	PCT	GB	Tie
1	y-Purefoods Tender Juicy Giants	12	6	.667	–	
2	y-Sta. Lucia Realtors	12	6	.667	–	
3	x-Alaska Aces	11	7	.611	1	
4	x-Red Bull Barako	11	7	.611	1	
5	x-Magnolia Beverage Masters	10	8	.556	2	
6	w-Talk 'N Text Phone Pals	9	9	.500	3	
7	w-Barangay Ginebra Kings	8	10	.444	4	
8	w-Air21 Express	7	11	.389	5	
9	w-Coca Cola Tigers	7	11	.389	5	
10	e-Welcoat Dragons	3	15	.167	9	

Legend:

- y-Qualified for semifinals
- x-Qualified for quarterfinals
- w-Qualified for the wildcard phase
- e-Eliminated

=== Game log ===
2008 PBA Philippine Cup game log
October

Game	Date	Opponent	Score	High points	High rebounds	High assists	Location Attendance	Record
1	October 17	Sta.Lucia	96-89	J. Yap (29)			Araneta Coliseum	1–0
2	October 20	Talk 'N Text	112-97	Raymundo (25) J. Yap (24)			Dumaguete	2–0
3	October 26	Magnolia	93-90	J. Yap (25)			Araneta Coliseum	3–0

November

Game	Date	Opponent	Score	High points	High rebounds	High assists	Location Attendance	Record
4	November 2	Welcoat	87-77	J. Yap (28)			Cuneta Astrodome	4–0
5	November 4	Brgy.Ginebra	103-76	Simon (27)			Cuneta Astrodome	5–0
6	November 9	Coca Cola	88-86	Raymundo (21)			Ynares Center	6–0
7	November 14	Air21	100-81	Simon (22)			Araneta Coliseum	7–0
8	November 17	Red Bull	74–87	J. Yap (23)			Tacloban City	7–1
9	November 21	Alaska	87-86	J. Yap (23)			Araneta Coliseum	8–1
10	November 25	Sta.Lucia	84-81	J. Yap (16)			Araneta Coliseum	9–1
11	November 30	Magnolia	86–108	Lanete (19)			Ynares Center	9–2

December

Game	Date	Opponent	Score	High points	High rebounds	High assists	Location Attendance	Record
12	December 7	Talk 'N Text	98–101	J. Yap (25)			Cuneta Astrodome	9–3
13	December 9	Welcoat	92-80	Raymundo (21) J. Yap (21)			Cuneta Astrodome	10–3
14	December 15	Air21	114-92	J. Yap (25)			Bacolod	11–3
15	December 25	Brgy.Ginebra	98–100	J. Yap (20) Raymundo (20)			Araneta Coliseum	11–4

January

Game	Date	Opponent	Score	High points	High rebounds	High assists	Location Attendance	Record
16	January 6	Coca Cola	101-87	J. Yap (29)			Araneta Coliseum	12–4
17	January 11	Alaska					Araneta Coliseum	12–5
18	January 16	Red Bull	84–97	J. Yap (22)			Cuneta Astrodome	12–6

2007–08 schedule

== Fiesta Conference ==
=== Game log ===
2008 PBA Fiesta Conference game log
April

Game	Date	Opponent	Score	High points	High rebounds	High assists	Location Attendance	Record
1	April 2	Magnolia	127-126 (2OT)	Rice (56)			Araneta Coliseum	1–0
2	April 5	Coca Cola	108–109	Rice (37)			Parañaque	1–1
3	April 9	Air21	102-94	J. Yap (25)			Araneta Coliseum	2–1
4	April 16	Red Bull	96–98	Rice (31)			Araneta Coliseum	2–2
5	April 20	Welcoat	103–110				Araneta Coliseum	2–3

May

Game	Date	Opponent	Score	High points	High rebounds	High assists	Location Attendance	Record
6	May 2	Brgy.Ginebra	99–102				Araneta Coliseum	2–4
7	May 10	Alaska	88-78	J. Yap (24)			Calape, Bohol	3–4
8	May 16	Magnolia	81–88	Villanueva (18)			Araneta Coliseum	3–5
9	May 21	Talk 'N Text	84-79				Ynares Center	4–5
10	May 25	Sta.Lucia	82-74				Cuneta Astrodome	5–5
11	May 30	Alaska	60–88	Rhalimi (13)			Ynares Center	5–6

June

Game	Date	Opponent	Score	High points	High rebounds	High assists	Location Attendance	Record
12	June 4	Coca Cola	100-98	J. Yap (31)			Araneta Coliseum	6–6
13	June 7	Welcoat	97–102	Rhalimi (21)			Lanao del Norte	6–7
14	June 11	Brgy.Ginebra	81–89	Rhalimi (28)	Rhalimi (15)		Araneta Coliseum	6–8
15	June 15	Red Bull	93-91	J. Yap (25)			Araneta Coliseum	7–8
16	June 20	Talk 'N Text	101–102	Rhalimi (21)			Cuneta Astrodome	7–9
17	June 27	Sta.Lucia	104-89				Araneta Coliseum	8–9

July

Game	Date	Opponent	Score	High points	High rebounds	High assists	Location Attendance	Record
18	July 2	Air21	103–113	J. Yap (24)			Araneta Coliseum	8–10

2007–08 schedule

== Transactions ==
=== Trades ===
March 27, 2008	To Magnolia Beverage Masters Marc Pingris	To Purefoods Tender Juicy Giants Enrico Villanueva
