= 2007–08 Magnolia Beverage Masters season =

- Head coach: Siot Tanquingcen
- General Manager: Hector Calma
- Owner(s): San Miguel Corporation

Philippine Cup results
- Record: 10–10 (50%)
- Place: 5th
- Playoff finish: Quarterfinals (lost to Red Bull)

Fiesta Conference results
- Record: 14–14 (50%)
- Place: 4th
- Playoff finish: Semifinals (lost to Air21)

Magnolia Beverage Masters seasons

The 2007–08 Magnolia Beverage Masters season was the 33rd season of the franchise in the Philippine Basketball Association (PBA).

== Key dates ==
August 19: The 2007 PBA Draft took place at Market! Market! in Bonifacio Global City, Taguig.

== Draft picks ==
Round	Pick	Player	Height	Position	Nationality	College
1	2	Samigue Eman	6'9"	Center	Philippines	Mindanao
1	9	Jonas Villanueva	6'0"	Guard	Philippines	FEU

== Roster ==
2007–08 Magnolia Beverage Masters roster
Players

Pos.	#	POB	Name	Height	Weight	DOB (YYYY–MM–DD)	From
G	1	(Philippines)	Mike Cortez	5 ft 11 in (1.80 m)	170 lb (77 kg)		De La Salle
F	2	(Philippines)	Gabby Espinas	6 ft 4 in (1.93 m)	200 lb (91 kg)		Philippine Christian
G	3	(Philippines)	Jonas Villanueva	6 ft 0 in (1.83 m)	178 lb (81 kg)		Far Eastern
C	4	(United States)	Dorian Peña	6 ft 7 in (2.01 m)	235 lb (107 kg)		Coppin State
G	7	(Philippines)	Dondon Hontiveros	6 ft 2 in (1.88 m)	175 lb (79 kg)		Cebu
F/C	10	(Philippines)	Danny Ildefonso	6 ft 6 in (1.98 m)	210 lb (95 kg)		National-U
G/F	15	(Philippines)	Wesley Gonzales	6 ft 4 in (1.93 m)	180 lb (82 kg)		Ateneo
F	16	(Philippines)	Marc Pingris	6 ft 6 in (1.98 m)	200 lb (91 kg)		PSBA
G	17	(Philippines)	Olsen Racela	5 ft 10 in (1.78 m)	165 lb (75 kg)		Ateneo
G/F	18	(Philippines)	Lordy Tugade	6 ft 3 in (1.91 m)	185 lb (84 kg)		National-U
C	21	(Philippines)	Samigue Eman	6 ft 9 in (2.06 m)	239 lb (108 kg)		Mindanao
F	41	(Philippines)	Ken Bono	6 ft 5 in (1.96 m)	230 lb (104 kg)		Adamson
F	42	(United States)	Danny Seigle	6 ft 7 in (2.01 m)	205 lb (93 kg)		Wagner
G	88	(Philippines)	Chris Calaguio	6 ft 0 in (1.83 m)	185 lb (84 kg)		Letran
C	40	(United States)	Jameel Watkins (I)	6 ft 11 in (2.11 m)	255 lb (116 kg)		Georgetown
C	52	(United States)	Amal McCaskill (I)	6 ft 11 in (2.11 m)	244 lb (111 kg)		Marquette

Coaches

Head coach

- Siot Tanquingcen

Assistant coach(es)

- Pido Jarencio
- Biboy Ravanes

Legend

- (C) Team captain
- (I) Import
- Injured

== Philippine Cup ==
=== Game log ===
2008 PBA Philippine Cup game log
October

Game	Date	Opponent	Score	High points	High rebounds	High assists	Location Attendance	Record
1	October 14	Air21	121–112	Seigle (28)			Araneta Coliseum	1–0
2	October 21	Sta.Lucia	101–96	Seigle, Hontiveros (18)			Araneta Coliseum	2–0
3	October 26	Purefoods	90–93	Tugade (23)			Araneta Coliseum	2–1
4	October 28	Coca Cola	89–78	Tugade (21)			Araneta Coliseum	3–1

November

Game	Date	Opponent	Score	High points	High rebounds	High assists	Location Attendance	Record
5	November 3	Talk 'N Text	94–100	Seigle (26)			Muntinlupa	3–2
6	November 9	Alaska	112–108	Seigle (20)			Ynares Center	4–2
7	November 16	Welcoat	93–95	Hontiveros (24)			Cuneta Astrodome	4–3
8	November 18	Brgy.Ginebra	101–90	Tugade (34)			Araneta Coliseum	5–3
9	November 23	Red Bull	95–107				Araneta Coliseum	5–4
10	November 30	Purefoods	108–86	Calaguio (22)			Ynares Center	6–4

December

Game	Date	Opponent	Score	High points	High rebounds	High assists	Location Attendance	Record
11	December 2	Talk 'N Text	96–93	Hontiveros (26)			Ynares Center	7–4
12	December 8	Red Bull	88–94	Seigle (20)			Cavite City	7–5
13	December 12	Coca Cola	108–114	Tenorio (23)			Araneta Coliseum	7–6
14	December 16	Brgy.Ginebra	100–115	Seigle (19)			Araneta Coliseum	7–7
15	December 22	Alaska	104–92	Tugade (30)			Cagayan de Oro	8–7
16	December 28	Air21					Araneta Coliseum	9–7

January

Game	Date	Opponent	Score	High points	High rebounds	High assists	Location Attendance	Record
17	January 6	Sta.Lucia	77–99				Araneta Coliseum	9–8
18	January 11	Welcoat	96–84	Seigle (32)			Araneta Coliseum	10–8

2007–08 schedule

== Fiesta Conference ==
=== Game log ===
2008 PBA Fiesta Conference game log
April

Game	Date	Opponent	Score	High points	High rebounds	High assists	Location Attendance	Record
1	April 2	Purefoods	126–127 (2OT)	Hontiveros (29)			Araneta Coliseum	0–1
2	April 6	Sta.Lucia	86–88	Watkins (20)			Ynares Center	0–2
3	April 11	Alaska	89–81	Racela (18) Seigle (18)			Araneta Coliseum	1–2
4	April 13	Talk 'N Text	91–86				Araneta Coliseum	2–2
5	April 20	Brgy.Ginebra	95–92	Watkins (20)	Watkins (19)		Araneta Coliseum	3–2
6	April 30	Welcoat	101–108	Watkins (26)			Araneta Coliseum	3–3

May

Game	Date	Opponent	Score	High points	High rebounds	High assists	Location Attendance	Record
7	May 3	Red Bull	102–95	Tugade (22)			Lipa City, Batangas	4–3
8	May 9	Coca Cola	92–106	Tugade (23)			Araneta Coliseum	4–4
9	May 16	Purefoods	88–81	Seigle (27)			Araneta Coliseum	5–4
10	May 21	Air21	90–96	Watkins (29)			Ynares Center	5–5
11	May 28	Brgy.Ginebra	76–87	Watkins (22)			Araneta Coliseum	5–6
12	May 31	Talk 'N Text	84–82	Tugade (29)			Puerto Princesa	6–6

June

Game	Date	Opponent	Score	High points	High rebounds	High assists	Location Attendance	Record
13	June 4	Welcoat	94–86	Racela (20)			Araneta Coliseum	7–6
14	June 8	Red Bull	75–84				Araneta Coliseum	7–7
15	June 13	Sta.Lucia	80–74	McCaskill (16)			Cuneta Astrodome	8–7
16	June 20	Coca Cola	81–77	Tugade (14)			Cuneta Astrodome	9–7
17	June 25	Air21	88–90				Araneta Coliseum	9–8
18	June 29	Alaska	80–79	Cortez (18)			Araneta Coliseum	10–8

2007–08 schedule

== Transactions ==
=== Trades ===
March 23, 2008	To Alaska Aces LA Tenorio, Larry Fonacier	To Magnolia Beverage Masters Mike Cortez, Ken Bono

March 27, 2008	To Purefoods Tender Juicy Giants Enrico Villanueva	To Magnolia Beverage Masters Marc Pingris

=== Additions ===
Player	Signed	Former team
Chester Tolomia	March 2008	Coca Cola Tigers

=== Subtractions ===
Player	Traded	New team
Willy Wilson	March 2008	Barangay Ginebra Kings
