= 2007–08 Barangay Ginebra Kings season =

- Head coach: Jong Uichico
- General Manager: Samboy Lim
- Owner(s): Ginebra San Miguel, Inc.

Philippine Cup results
- Record: 8–11 (42.1%)
- Place: 9th
- Playoff finish: Wildcard (lost to Air21)

Fiesta Conference results
- Record: 20–11 (64.5%)
- Place: 1st
- Playoff finish: Finals (def.Air21, 4–3)

Barangay Ginebra Kings seasons

The 2007–08 Barangay Ginebra Kings season was the 29th season of the franchise in the Philippine Basketball Association (PBA).

== Key dates ==
August 19: The 2007 PBA Draft took place at Market! Market! in Bonifacio Global City, Taguig.

== Draft picks ==
Round	Pick	Player	Height	Position	Nationality	College
1	10	Macky Escalona	5'11"	Point guard	Philippines	Ateneo

== Roster ==
2007–08 Barangay Ginebra Kings roster
Players
Coaches

Pos.	#	POB	Name	Height	Weight	DOB (YYYY–MM–DD)	From
C	2	(Philippines)	Billy Mamaril	6 ft 6 in (1.98 m)	220 lb (100 kg)		Bakersfield
C	4	(United States)	Rafi Reavis	6 ft 8 in (2.03 m)	210 lb (95 kg)		Coppin State
G	5	(Philippines)	Macky Escalona	5 ft 11 in (1.80 m)	180 lb (82 kg)		Ateneo
F	9	(Philippines)	Rodney Santos	6 ft 2 in (1.88 m)	175 lb (79 kg)		San Sebastian
G	10	(Philippines)	Junthy Valenzuela	6 ft 2 in (1.88 m)	185 lb (84 kg)		SCSIT
G	13	(Philippines)	Jayjay Helterbrand	5 ft 11 in (1.80 m)	170 lb (77 kg)		Kentucky State
G	16	(Philippines)	Paul Artadi	5 ft 9 in (1.75 m)	150 lb (68 kg)		UE
G	22	(United States)	Chris Pacana	6 ft 1 in (1.85 m)	200 lb (91 kg)		Saint Francis of Assisi
F	27	(United States)	Willy Wilson	6 ft 3 in (1.91 m)	215 lb (98 kg)		De La Salle
C	30	(United States)	Eric Menk	6 ft 6 in (1.98 m)	220 lb (100 kg)		Lake Superior State
F	33	(Philippines)	Victor Pablo	6 ft 4 in (1.93 m)	200 lb (91 kg)		Far Eastern
C	43	(United States)	Alex Crisano	6 ft 7 in (2.01 m)	240 lb (109 kg)		Brooklyn
G	47	(Philippines)	Mark Caguioa	6 ft 1 in (1.85 m)	185 lb (84 kg)		Glendale CC (CA)
G	71	(Philippines)	Ronald Tubid	6 ft 1 in (1.85 m)	175 lb (79 kg)		UE
G	80	(Philippines)	Sunday Salvacion	6 ft 3 in (1.91 m)	190 lb (86 kg)		St. Benilde
C	0	(United States)	Rahshon Turner (I)	6 ft 7 in (2.01 m)	200 lb (91 kg)		Fairleigh Dickinson
C	52	(United States)	Ernest Brown (I)	7 ft 0 in (2.13 m)	244 lb (111 kg)		Indian Hills CC
C	44	(United States)	Chris Alexander (I)	7 ft 1 in (2.16 m)	240 lb (109 kg)		Iowa State

Head coach

- (Philippines) Jong Uichico (De La Salle)

Assistant coach(es)

- (Philippines) Art dela Cruz (San Sebastian)
- (Philippines) Juno Sauler (De La Salle)
- (Philippines) Allan Caidic (UE)

Team manager

- (Philippines) Samboy Lim (Letran)

Legend

- (C) Team captain
- (CI) Commissioner's Cup Import
- (GI) Governors' Cup Import
- (EI) EASL Import
- (DP) Unsigned draft pick
- (FA) Free agent
- (IN) Inactive
- (S) Suspended
- (R) Rookie
- (I) Import
- Injured

== Philippine Cup ==
=== Game log ===
2007–08 PBA Philippine Cup game log
October

Game	Date	Opponent	Score	High points	High rebounds	High assists	Location Attendance	Record
1	October 19	Red Bull	102–95	Macapagal (21)			Cuneta Astrodome	1–0
2	October 24	Talk 'N Text	102–111	Tubid (22)			Araneta Coliseum	1–1
3	October 27	Welcoat	64–82	Mamaril (17)			Roxas City	1–2
4	October 31	Alaska	92–103 OT	Helterbrand (18)			Cuneta Astrodome	1–3

November

Game	Date	Opponent	Score	High points	High rebounds	High assists	Location Attendance	Record
5	November 4	Purefoods	76–103	Tubid (11)			Cuneta Astrodome	1–4
6	November 10	Sta.Lucia	103–90	Helterbrand (24)			General Santos	2–4
7	November 16	Air21	95–102	Helterbrand (22)			Cuneta Astrodome	2–5
8	November 18	Magnolia	90–101	Menk (22)			Araneta Coliseum	2–6
9	November 24	Coca Cola	110–102	Caguioa (35)			Araneta Coliseum	3–6
10	November 28	Welcoat	94–87	Caguioa (21)			Araneta Coliseum	4–6

December

Game	Date	Opponent	Score	High points	High rebounds	High assists	Location Attendance	Record
11	December 1	Alaska	82–87	Caguioa (28)			Lucena City	4–7
12	December 7	Air21	108–103	Menk (19)			Cuneta Astrodome	5–7
13	December 9	Sta.Lucia	78–79	Helterbrand (19)			Cuneta Astrodome	5–8
14	December 16	Magnolia	115–100	Helterbrand (34), Tubid (27)			Araneta Coliseum	6–8
15	December 21	Coca Cola	82–84	Salvacion (19)			Cuneta Astrodome	6–9
16	December 25	Purefoods	100–98	Salvacion (21), Menk (21)			Araneta Coliseum	7–9

January

Game	Date	Opponent	Score	High points	High rebounds	High assists	Location Attendance	Record
17	January 4	Red Bull	115–110				Cuneta Astrodome	8–9
18	January 13	Talk 'N Text	87–104				Araneta Coliseum	8–10

2007–08 schedule

== Fiesta Conference ==
=== Game log ===
2008 PBA Fiesta Conference game log
March

Game	Date	Opponent	Score	High points	High rebounds	High assists	Location Attendance	Record
1	March 30	Red Bull	83–89				Araneta Coliseum	0–1

April

Game	Date	Opponent	Score	High points	High rebounds	High assists	Location Attendance	Record
2	April 6	Alaska	89–102	Caguioa (25)			Ynares Center	0–2
3	April 12	Sta.Lucia	97–101	Brown (24)			Tacloban City	0–3
4	April 18	Coca Cola	81–82	Caguioa (30)			Araneta Coliseum	0–4
5	April 20	Magnolia	92–95				Araneta Coliseum	0–5

May

Game	Date	Opponent	Score	High points	High rebounds	High assists	Location Attendance	Record
6	May 2	Purefoods	102–99		Alexander (27)		Araneta Coliseum	1–5
7	May 7	Air21	88–97				Araneta Coliseum	1–6
8	May 11	Talk 'N Text	95–105	Caguioa (24)			Araneta Coliseum	1–7
9	May 18	Welcoat	105–70				Araneta Coliseum	2–7
10	May 24	Air21	97–92	Caguioa (39)			Zamboanga City	3–7
11	May 28	Magnolia	87–76	Helterbrand (23)	Alexander (29)		Araneta Coliseum	4–7

June

Game	Date	Opponent	Score	High points	High rebounds	High assists	Location Attendance	Record
12	June 1	Red Bull	82–86	Alexander (27)			Araneta Coliseum	4–8
13	June 6	Sta.Lucia	112–104	Alexander (35) Helterbrand (31)			Cuneta Astrodome	5–8
14	June 11	Purefoods	89–81	Tubid (21)			Araneta Coliseum	6–8
15	June 15	Coca Cola	91–84	Helterbrand (27)			Araneta Coliseum	7–8
16	June 29	Talk 'N Text	100–89	Helterbrand (30)			Araneta Coliseum	8–8

July

Game	Date	Opponent	Score	High points	High rebounds	High assists	Location Attendance	Record
17	July 4	Welcoat	111–96	Caguioa (26)			Araneta Coliseum	9–8
18	July 6	Alaska	97–90	Helterbrand (20)			Cuneta Astrodome	10–8

2007–08 schedule

_{Note: Last playing date on July 6 was originally scheduled on June 22}

== Transactions ==
=== Additions ===
Player	Signed	Former team
Willy Wilson	March 25, 2008	Magnolia Beverage Masters
Junthy Valenzuela	April 16, 2008	Red Bull Barako
Chris Pacana	March, 2008	
Victor Pablo	March, 2008	

=== Subtractions ===
Player	Traded	New team
Mark Macapagal	March 25, 2008	Coca Cola Tigers
Michael Holper	March, 2008	
Gilbert Lao	March, 2008	
JR Aquino	March, 2008	
