= UAAP Season 69 men's basketball tournament =

Basketball competition in the Philippines

UAAP Season 69
- Host school: University of the East
Men's Finals	G1	G2	G3 (OT)	Wins
Ateneo Blue Eagles	73	71	74	1
UST Growling Tigers	72	87	76	2
- Duration: September 24 to October 2
- Arena(s): Araneta Coliseum
- Finals MVP: Jojo Duncil
- Winning coach: Pido Jarencio
- Semifinalists: UE Red Warriors; Adamson Soaring Falcons
- TV network(s): Studio 23 and TFC

The men's basketball tournaments of UAAP Season 69 (A.Y. 2006-07) started on July 8, 2006 at the Araneta Coliseum and ended on October 2, 2006 also at the same venue with the UST Growling Tigers defeating the Ateneo Blue Eagles in the third game of their Finals series. Ateneo finished first in the elimination round. They eliminated the Adamson Soaring Falcons, who are in their Final Four debut, in the semifinals. UST finished tied for third in the eliminations and had to beat the 2nd seed UE Red Warriors twice in order to qualify at the Finals.

2005 losing finalists De La Salle Green Archers were suspended when it was revealed that two players used spurious documents to enter college. All of their wins from 2003 to 2005 were also forfeited. La Salle's suspension also caused the suspension of the 2005 juniors champions De La Salle Junior Archers. All La Salle teams would return in the 2007 season.

== Preseason events ==
In a meeting held at Adamson University on April 21, 2006, the UAAP Board unanimously voted to suspend De La Salle from all UAAP events on both divisions for the 2006–2007 (69th) season due to negligence.

New coaches include the comebacking Joe Lipa for the UP Fighting Maroons, Leo Austria for the Adamson Falcons, and Pido Jarencio for the UST Growling Tigers.

Since Joe Lipa was tapped as the new coach of UP, Elmer Yanga, former team manager of the RFM franchise in the Philippine Basketball Association, was chosen as the new basketball commissioner for the season.

All of the elimination's first-round games after Opening Day was held at the Ninoy Aquino Stadium in Malate, Manila. Second round games were held at the Philsports Arena and the Araneta Coliseum. The Final Four and the best-of-three Finals are set at the Big Dome as well.

== Coaches ==
=== Current coaches ===
- Adamson Soaring Falcons – Leo Austria
- Ateneo Blue Eagles – Norman Black
- FEU Tamaraws – Bert Flores
- NU Bulldogs – Manny Dandan
- UE Red Warriors – Dindo Pumaren
- UP Fighting Maroons – Joe Lipa
- UST Growling Tigers – Pido Jarencio

=== Coaching changes ===
Team	Outgoing coach	Replaced by
Adamson Soaring Falcons	Mel Alas	Leo Austria
UP Fighting Maroons	Lito Vergara	Joe Lipa
UST Growling Tigers	Nel Parado	Pido Jarencio

== Elimination round ==
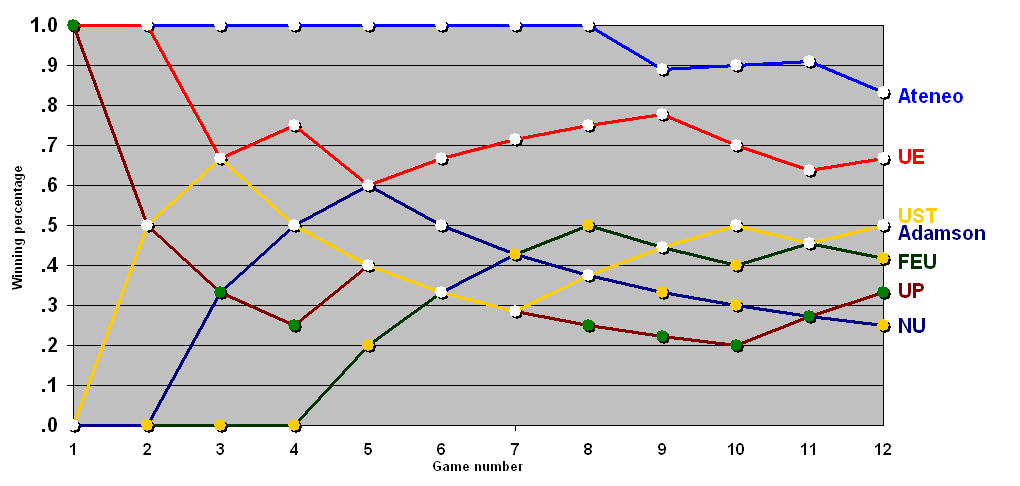
Team standings progression in the men's basketball tournament.

Pos	Team	W	L	PCT	GB	Qualification
1	Ateneo Blue Eagles	10	2	.833	—	Twice-to-beat in the semifinals
2	UE Red Warriors (H)	8	4	.667	2	Twice-to-beat in the semifinals
3	UST Growling Tigers	6	6	.500 (Note: Third-seed playoff: UST 85–71 Adamson)	4	Twice-to-win in the semifinals
4	Adamson Soaring Falcons	6	6	.500	4	Twice-to-win in the semifinals
5	FEU Tamaraws	5	7	.417	5	
6	UP Fighting Maroons	4	8	.333	6	
7	NU Bulldogs	3	9	.250	7	

Source: ABS-CBN Sports
Rules for classification: 1) winning percentage; 2) if tied for top 4 seeds, one-game playoff; 3) head-to-head record; 4) head-to-head point differential; 5) overall point differential
(H) Hosts

=== Match-up results ===
	Round 1						Round 2					
Team ╲ Game	1	2	3	4	5	6	7	8	9	10	11	12
Adamson	UE school colors	NU school colors	Ateneo school colors	UP school colors	UST school colors	FEU school colors	FEU school colors	Ateneo school colors	UP school colors	UE school colors	UST school colors	NU school colors
Ateneo	NU school colors	UP school colors	Adamson school colors	FEU school colors	UE school colors	UST school colors	Adamson school colors	UP school colors	UST school colors	NU school colors	FEU school colors	UE school colors
FEU	UE school colors	UST school colors	NU school colors	Ateneo school colors	UP school colors	Adamson school colors	Adamson school colors	UP school colors	UE school colors	UST school colors	NU school colors	Ateneo school colors
NU	Ateneo school colors	Adamson school colors	FEU school colors	UE school colors	UP school colors	UST school colors	UP school colors	UST school colors	UE school colors	FEU school colors	Ateneo school colors	Adamson school colors
UE	Adamson school colors	FEU school colors	UST school colors	NU school colors	Ateneo school colors	UP school colors	UST school colors	FEU school colors	NU school colors	Adamson school colors	UP school colors	Ateneo school colors
UP	UST school colors	Ateneo school colors	Adamson school colors	FEU school colors	NU school colors	UE school colors	NU school colors	FEU school colors	Ateneo school colors	Adamson school colors	UST school colors	UE school colors
UST	UP school colors	FEU school colors	UE school colors	NU school colors	Adamson school colors	Ateneo school colors	UE school colors	NU school colors	FEU school colors	Ateneo school colors	UP school colors	Adamson school colors

= Win; = OT win; = Loss; = OT loss

=== Scores ===
Results on top and to the right of the dashes are for first-round games; those to the bottom and to the left of it are second-round games.

Teams	AdU	AdMU	FEU	NU	UE	UP	UST
Adamson Soaring Falcons	—	72–73	78–98	88–64	57–72	85–83	74–62
Ateneo Blue Eagles	66–65	—	76–74	75–70	82–75	98–89	114–78
FEU Tamaraws	79–64	68–70	—	64–73	84–92*	94–86	87–90
NU Bulldogs	88–93	76–103	60–72	—	90–96	86–95	98–85
UE Red Warriors	84–89*	78–75	76–63	76–57	—	96–84	77–91
UP Fighting Maroons	68–76	88–98	76–89	104–107	90–85	—	94–92
UST Growling Tigers	77–74	88–80*	77–75	75–67	63–74	67–70	—

Source: Philippine Daily Inquirer
Legend: Blue = left column team win; Red = top row team win.
Matches with lighter background shading were decided after overtime.

== Statistical leaders ==
- Points: Kenneth Bono (Adamson, 21.8)
- Rebounds: Jervy Cruz (UST, 12.8)
- Assists: Japs Cuan (UST, 6.3)
- Blocks: Elmer Espiritu (UE, 2.1)
- Steals: Marvin Cruz (UP, 2.0)
- Turnovers: Bonbon Custodio (UE, 4.3)

== Postseason teams ==
Adamson make their first Final Four appearance since the format's first application in 1994. Ateneo and UE continue their streaks of playoff appearances, as UST returns after a three-year absence. The FEU Tamaraws were the first defending champions not to qualify for the semifinals.

=== Ateneo Blue Eagles ===
The Eagles entered the season as one of the preseason favorites. After winning a nailbiter against lowly NU Bulldogs on Opening Day, the Eagles went on an 8-game winning streak, sweeping the first round, and surviving squeakers against Adamson and FEU, and blowing out UST by 36 points, 114–78 on the first round finale through a high scoring second quarter.

The second round was more of the same, when Ateneo again survived another 1-point game against the Falcons. However, they were dealt with their first setback in an overtime loss against the Growling Tigers, who were without three players due to injuries and ailments. Despite the loss, the Eagles were already assured of a twice-to-beat advantage at the semi-finals. They also dropped their last assignment, a no-bearing game against the Warriors at the last day of eliminations.

=== UE Red Warriors ===
Returning with an intact lineup, the hosts also emerged as one of the preseason favorites. However, the first round was mixed, as they were beaten by UST and Ateneo, but they finished second.

On the second round, UE was unbeaten, winning four straight (including the last game of the first round). However, UE was beaten by Adamson in an overtime thriller. After UST's victory of Adamson in the first game, UE is now assured of a twice-to-beat advantage at the semifinals.

=== UST Growling Tigers ===
The Growling Tigers opened the season with a stunning loss against the UP Fighting Maroons on a buzzer-beater shot by Marvin Cruz. However, they beat the defending champions Far Eastern and top seeds East in two closely fought games. With setbacks against National, Adamson and a blowout loss against Ateneo, their Final Four aspirations were cast in doubt.

Santo Tomas opened their second round with another loss against UE. But they broke the .500 barrier with successive wins against National, Far Eastern, and an overtime win against Ateneo. Flirting a possible twice-to-beat advantage at the semifinals, the Maroons dealt the Tigers another defeat. With their fates not in their hands, they've beaten the Soaring Falcons in a tightly contested game. With Ateneo's drubbing of Far Eastern, the Tigers entered the Final Four for the first time since 2002.

=== Adamson Soaring Falcons ===
The Falcons is the only team not to enter the men's Final Four since the league instituted it in 1994. Seeking to end the streak, the Falcons had their first win against the Bulldogs, after being demolished by the hosts in their opening game. But Adamson still faced a rocky ride, losing to top contenders, Ateneo and FEU but beating UP and UST to end the first round with an even 3–3 record.

Opening the second round, Adamson was beaten again by FEU and Ateneo. But with center Ken Bono posting MVP numbers, Adamson brought itself in the hunt for that elusive Final Four berth. They were able to demolish UP and upset UE in overtime. They lost to UST before closing out the second round with a win over NU. With Ateneo's defeat of Far Eastern, Adamson barged outright into their first Final Four appearance.

== Third seed playoff ==
Studio 23

September 14
4:00 p.m.

UST Growling Tigers	85–71	Adamson Soaring Falcons
Scoring by quarter: 16–16, 25–24, 26–15, 18–16
Pts: Jervy Cruz 20; Rebs: Jervy Cruz 14		Pts: Ken Bono 19; Rebs: Ken Bono 7

PhilSports Arena, Pasig

== Bracket ==
Semifinals (Top 2 twice-to-beat)
1	Ateneo	76
4	Adamson	73
2	UE	75	81
3	UST	79	82

Finals (Best-of-three playoff)
1	Ateneo	73	71	74
3	UST	72	87	76*

*Overtime

== Semifinals ==
Ateneo and UE have the twice-to-beat advantage. They only have to win once, while their opponents, twice, to progress.

=== Ateneo vs. Adamson ===
This was the Soaring Falcons' first Final Four appearance. Adamson gave Ateneo two one-point victories in the elimination round, with the Eagles escaping due to their endgame heroics.

Studio 23

September 17
2:00 p.m.

Ateneo Blue Eagles	76–73	Adamson Soaring Falcons
Scoring by quarter: 11–14, 21–20, 21–20, 23–19
Pts: JC Intal 17; Rebs: JC Intal 11		Pts: Ken Bono 33; Rebs: Ken Bono 9
Ateneo wins series in one game

Araneta Coliseum, Quezon City

A see-saw game until the fourth quarter, when Ken Bono of the Falcons converting a three-point play with 18.3 seconds remaining, to cut the Ateneo lead to, 74–73. On the inbound pass, Blue Eagle Chris Tiu threw an errant pass to Macky Escalona who failed to retrieve it. On the next possession, Soaring Falcon Patrick Cabahug missed a fadeaway jumper, which led to an Atenean rebound. The Falcons left with no choice but to foul Chris Tiu, who calmly sank his two freethrows, thereby eliminating the Falcons from contention.

=== UE vs. UST ===
Season host was favored in this matchup, with several veterans in the lineup. The Tigers have no players with playoff experience, save for Jemal Vizcarra who was out of the season by the second game due to an Anterior cruciate ligament (ACL) injury.

UST won the first game 91–77, while UE won the second game, 74–63 in the elimination round. UE's loss was the third time in tournament history where they were booted out of the semifinals armed with the twice-to-beat advantage (1994, 2002 and 2006). UE's last Finals appearance was on 1990.

Studio 23

September 17
4:00 p.m.

UE Red Warriors	75–79	UST Growling Tigers
Scoring by quarter: 18–14, 20–18, 14–17, 27–26
Pts: Bonbon Custodio 17		Pts: Mark Canlas 16

Araneta Coliseum, Quezon City

Studio 23

September 21
4:00 p.m.

UE Red Warriors	81–82	UST Growling Tigers
Scoring by quarter: 17–23, 21–20, 26–24, 17–15
Pts: Arellano, Llagas 14 each		Pts: Jervy Cruz 27
UST wins series in two games

Araneta Coliseum, Quezon City

In Game 1, UST led for much of the game, when the Warriors started making inroads by the third quarter. With 21.1 seconds left in the fourth quarter, and with UST up by two points, June Cortez of UST converted a three-point play that gave the Growling Tigers enough breathing space to force a deciding elimination game.

With the Tigers off to a hot start in Game 2, the Warriors kept within striking distance. In the fourth quarter, the Warriors forced a 70-all deadlock - the first in the game. UE then led by as much as five points, but the Tigers fought back, forcing turnovers and grabbing offensive rebounds, to tie the score at 79-all. After a UE turnover, Jojo Duncil missed the shot, but Jervy Cruz grabbed the offensive rebound, missing the put-back; Duncil then tipped in the ball for a two-point field goal, plus a foul. Duncil completed the three-point play. On the next possession, UE's Marcy Arellano drove unmolested to the basket, cutting the lead into one point. With a UST turnover and several seconds remaining, Red Warrior Jorel Cañizares missed a medium-range jump shot. Cañizares grabbed his own rebound but missed on a short stab; Warriors team captain Robert Labagala grabbed the rebound as time expired.

== Finals ==
The Growling Tigers and the Blue Eagles met each other for the first time in the UAAP Finals. The last time they met in the Finals was in the 1931 NCAA season, in which the Ateneo won.

=== Game One ===
Studio 23, TFC

September 24
4:00 p.m.

Ateneo Blue Eagles	73–72	UST Growling Tigers
Scoring by quarter: 19–15, 16–20, 22–22, 16–15
Pts: JC Intal 21; Rebs: Doug Kramer 13; Asts: Chris Tiu 4 Blocks: Zion Laterre 4		Pts: Jervy Cruz 20; Rebs: Jervy Cruz 13; Asts: Japs Cuan 3 TOs: Espiritu, Cuan 3 each
Ateneo leads series, 1–0

Araneta Coliseum, Quezon City

The game was close all throughout, with neither team leading by double figures. It ended in the fourth quarter with two crucial plays. With 4.3 seconds to go, Tigers forward Allan Evangelista made a tough fadeaway shot over the outstreched arms of Doug Kramer, pushing UST ahead of Ateneo, 72–71, with 1 second to go.

Ateneo coach Norman Black immediately called a time-out over the tumultuous din of the rejoicing UST fans. In the inbound play, Macky Escalona found a wide open Kramer in the paint, and the Ateneo forward calmly banked the ball in for the win, sending the Ateneo fans, in turn, into a wild frenzy.

=== Game Two ===
Studio 23, TFC

September 30
4:00 p.m.

Ateneo Blue Eagles	71–87	UST Growling Tigers
Scoring by quarter: 21–20, 27–18, 17–19, 22–14
Pts: JC Intal 23; Rebs: Doug Kramer 13; Asts: Intal, Escalona 4 each TOs: Chris Tiu 4		Pts: Dylan Ababou 22; Rebs: Jervy Cruz 13; Asts: Jervy Cruz 6 FG%: Dylan Ababou 82%
Series tied, 1–1

Araneta Coliseum, Quezon City

The Eagles, although led early, were down by a point at the end of the first half. The Tigers broke the zone defense by hitting outside shots and by grabbing offensive rebounds off their misses. JC Intal kept the Eagles at striking distance but his supporting cast wasn't enough as the Tigers cruised into a Game 2 victory, and forced a winner-take-all Game 3.

=== Game Three ===
Studio 23, TFC

October 2
3:00 p.m.

Ateneo Blue Eagles	74–76 (OT)	UST Growling Tigers
Scoring by quarter: 17–15, 20–16, 13–20, 14–13, Overtime: 10–12
Pts: Macky Escalona 28; Rebs: Zion Laterre 11; Asts: JC Intal 5 TOs: Ford Arao 5		Pts: Jojo Duncil 18; Rebs: Jervy Cruz 13; Asts: June Cortez 4 Bench pts.: 24
UST wins series, 2–1

Araneta Coliseum, Quezon City

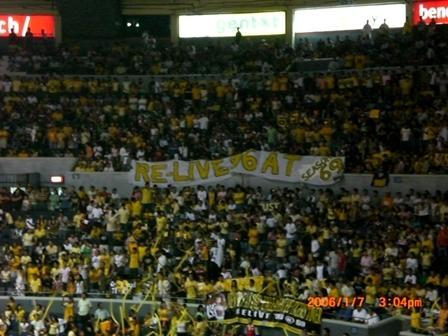
UST gallery at Game 3.

- Finals Most Valuable Player: Jojo Duncil (UST Growling Tigers)

With a tightly contested first quarter, the Intal-Escalona connection of the Eagles threatened to pull away at the second quarter, leading by as much as ten. In the third quarter, the Tigers stormed back, keeping in touch with the Blue Eagles. In the dying minutes of the fourth quarter, rookie sensation Jervy Cruz fouled out with 1:16 left; Evangelista, the almost-hero of Game 1, fouled out two minutes earlier. With a 64–59 Ateneo lead, Anthony Espiritu scored a three-pointer on the UST offense. Mark Canlas scored a put-back to tie the game. Intal missed a short jumper at the other end for force overtime.

With the score tied 74-all, June Cortez missed a jumper; Dylan Ababou was fouled as he grabbed the rebound. Ababou split his charities, which led to another JC Intal miss in the final seconds. The rebound was hotly contested, and the referee called for a jump ball; the possession arrow pointed to UST. Eric Salamat was forced to foul June Cortez, who converted his first and missed his second, which led to the Ateneo rebound with 3.6 ticks left. Jai Reyes heaved a desperation three-pointer that missed the ring completely, causing jubilation to the golden half of the Coliseum. An estimated 20,000 packed the Araneta Coliseum including United States Ambassador to the Philippines Kristie Kenney and Senator Richard Gordon .

Jojo Duncil was named Finals MVP award. Jarencio won his first UAAP title for UST.

== Awards ==
UAAP Season 69 men's basketball champions
UST Growling Tigers
18th title
(Nineteenth title including NCAA championships)

- Most Valuable Player: Ken Bono (Adamson Soaring Falcons)
- Rookie of the Year: Woody Co (UP Fighting Maroons)
- Mythical Team:
  - Guard: Marvin Cruz (UP Fighting Maroons)
  - Guard: Jeffrei Chan (FEU Tamaraws)
  - Forward: JC Intal (Ateneo Blue Eagles)
  - Forward: Jervy Cruz (UST Growling Tigers)
  - Center: Ken Bono (Adamson Soaring Falcons)
- Gilette Breakout Player: JC Intal (Ateneo Blue Eagles)
- PSBank Maasahan (Dependable) Player: Ken Bono (Adamson Soaring Falcons)
- Coach of the Year: Pido Jarencio (UST Growling Tigers)
- Player of the Year: JC Intal (Ateneo Blue Eagles)
- Scoring Champion: Ken Bono (Adamson Soaring Falcons)
- Mr. Clutch: Jojo Duncil (UST Growling Tigers)
- Defensive Player: Jervy Cruz (UST Growling Tigers)
- Sixth Man: Dylan Ababou (UST Growling Tigers)
- Comeback Player: Chris Tiu (Ateneo Blue Eagles)
- Most Improved Player: Marvin Cruz (UP Fighting Maroons)
- Sportsmanship Award: Jeffrei Chan (FEU Tamaraws)
- Energy Player: Marcy Arellano (UE Red Warriors)

== Suspensions ==
- Jonathan Jankhe of the NU Bulldogs for shoving a closed fist against Vicmel Epres of the UP Fighting Maroons. Served one-game suspension against, ironically, the same team.
- Jojo Duncil of the UST Growling Tigers for headbutting Dave Catamora of the NU Bulldogs. Served one-game suspension against the Adamson Soaring Falcons.
- Ira Buyco of the UP Fighting Maroons for hitting Macky Escalona of the Ateneo Blue Eagles in the face on a rebound play. Served one-game suspension against the Adamson Soaring Falcons.
- UE suspended Bonbon Custodio of the UE Red Warriors for disciplinary action. Served suspension on Game 2 of the semifinals against the UST Growling Tigers.
- Anthony Espiritu of the UST Growling Tigers was supposedly suspended on Game 3 of the Finals due to two flagrant fouls on Game 2 but was instead given a warning by the UAAP Board.

Preceded by Season 68 (2005)	UAAP men's basketball seasons Season 69 (2006) basketball	Succeeded by Season 70 (2007)
