= UAAP Season 69 basketball tournaments =

Basketball competition in the Philippines

UAAP Season 69
- Host school: University of the East
Men's Finals	G1	G2	G3 (OT)	Wins
Ateneo Blue Eagles	73	71	74	1
UST Growling Tigers	72	87	76	2
- Duration: Sept. 24, 2006 - Oct. 2, 2006
- Arena(s): Araneta Coliseum
- Finals MVP: Jojo Duncil
- Winning coach: Pido Jarencio
- Semifinalists: UE Red Warriors; Adamson Soaring Falcons
- TV network(s): Studio 23 and TFC
Women's Finals	G1	G2	G3	Wins
UST Growling Tigresses	52	67	67	2
FEU Lady Tamaraws	49	75	59	1
- Duration: September 21 to 30
- Arena(s): Araneta Coliseum
- Semifinalists: UP Lady Maroons; Ateneo Lady Eagles
Juniors' Finals	G1	G2	G3	Wins
Ateneo Blue Eaglets	55	73	69	2
FEU–D Baby Tamaraws	65	65	61	1
- Duration: September 21 to 30
- Arena(s): Araneta Coliseum
- Finals MVP: Michael Gamboa
- Semifinalists: Adamson Baby Falcons; UPIS Junior Fighting Maroons
- TV network(s): Studio 23 and TFC

The basketball tournaments of UAAP Season 69 started on July 8, 2006 at the Araneta Coliseum and ended on October 2, 2006 also at the same venue with the UST Growling Tigers defeating the Ateneo Blue Eagles in the third game of their Finals series.

The Ateneo Blue Eaglets triumphed over the FEU-FERN Baby Tamaraws to win the Juniors' championship, while the UST Tigresses won over the FEU Lady Tamaraws in the Women's Championship. In the Men's championship, the UST Growling Tigers rallied in the Finals series to beat the Ateneo Blue Eagles, 2 games to 1 to win their 19th basketball championship. Kenneth Bono of the Adamson Soaring Falcons, Bacon Austria of Ateneo and Cassy Tioseco of Ateneo won the Most Valuable Player awards.

== Men's tournament ==
=== Elimination round ===
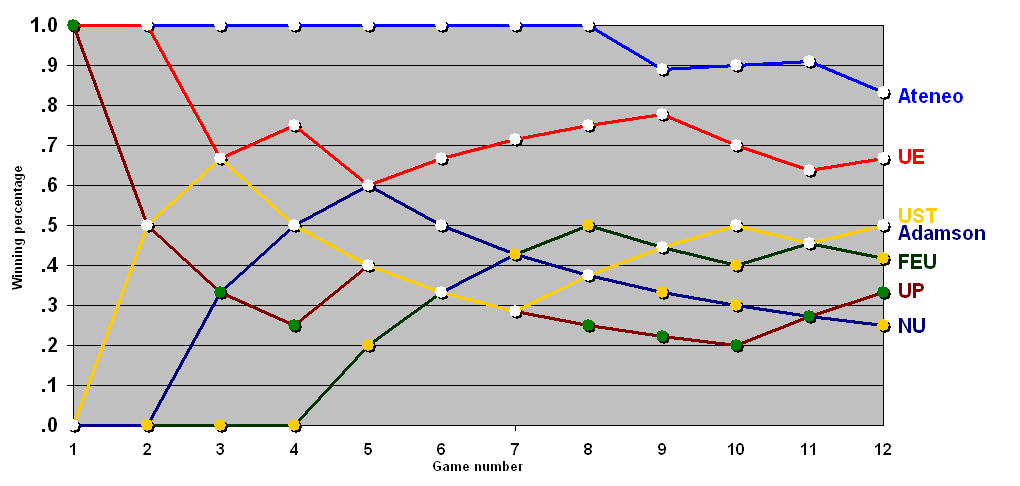
Team standings progression in the men's basketball tournament.

Pos	Team	W	L	PCT	GB	Qualification
1	Ateneo Blue Eagles	10	2	.833	—	Twice-to-beat in the semifinals
2	UE Red Warriors (H)	8	4	.667	2	Twice-to-beat in the semifinals
3	UST Growling Tigers	6	6	.500 (Note: Third-seed playoff: UST 85–71 Adamson)	4	Twice-to-win in the semifinals
4	Adamson Soaring Falcons	6	6	.500	4	Twice-to-win in the semifinals
5	FEU Tamaraws	5	7	.417	5	
6	UP Fighting Maroons	4	8	.333	6	
7	NU Bulldogs	3	9	.250	7	

Source: ABS-CBN Sports
Rules for classification: 1) winning percentage; 2) if tied for top 4 seeds, one-game playoff; 3) head-to-head record; 4) head-to-head point differential; 5) overall point differential
(H) Hosts

==== Rivalry games ====
These are the results of the different rivalry games:

Studio 23

July 16

UP Fighting Maroons	89–98	Ateneo Blue Eagles

Ninoy Aquino Stadium

Studio 23

August 20

Ateneo Blue Eagles	98–88	UP Fighting Maroons

Araneta Coliseum

Studio 23

July 15

FEU Tamaraws	84–92	UE Red Warriors

Ninoy Aquino Stadium

Studio 23

August 20

UE Red Warriors	73–86	FEU Tamaraws

Araneta Coliseum

=== Third seed playoff ===
Studio 23

Sept. 14

UST Growling Tigers	85–71	Adamson Soaring Falcons

PhilSports Arena

=== Bracket ===
Semifinals (Top 2 twice-to-beat)
1	Ateneo	76
4	Adamson	73
2	UE	75	81
3	UST	79	82

Finals (Best-of-three playoff)
1	Ateneo	73	71	74
3	UST	72	87	76*

*Overtime

=== Semifinals ===
In the semifinals, the higher seed has the twice-to-beat advantage, where they only have to win once, while their opponents twice, to progress.

==== (1) Ateneo vs. (4) Adamson ====
The Ateneo Blue Eagles has the twice-to-beat advantage.

Studio 23

September 17

Adamson Soaring Falcons	73–76	Ateneo Blue Eagles
Ateneo wins series in one game

Araneta Coliseum, Quezon City

==== (2) UE vs. (3) UST ====
The UE Red Warriors has the twice-to-beat advantage.

Studio 23

September 17

UST Growling Tigers	79–75	UE Red Warriors

Araneta Coliseum, Quezon City

Studio 23

September 21

UST Growling Tigers	82–81	UE Red Warriors
UST wins series in two games

Araneta Coliseum, Quezon City

=== Finals ===
Studio 23

September 24

UST Growling Tigers	72–73	Ateneo Blue Eagles

Araneta Coliseum, Quezon City

Studio 23

September 30

UST Growling Tigers	87–71	Ateneo Blue Eagles

Araneta Coliseum, Quezon City

Studio 23

October 2

UST Growling Tigers	76–74 (OT)	Ateneo Blue Eagles
UST wins series 2–1

Araneta Coliseum, Quezon City

- Finals Most Valuable Player: Jojo Duncil (UST Growling Tigers)

=== Awards ===
UAAP Season 69 men's basketball champions
UST Growling Tigers
18th title

- Most Valuable Player: Ken Bono (Adamson Soaring Falcons)
- Rookie of the Year: Woody Co (UP Fighting Maroons)
- Mythical Team:
  - Guard: Marvin Cruz (UP Fighting Maroons)
  - Guard: Jeff Chan (FEU Tamaraws)
  - Forward: JC Intal (Ateneo Blue Eagles)
  - Forward: Jervy Cruz (UST Growling Tigers)
  - Center: Ken Bono (Adamson Soaring Falcons)
- Gilette Breakout Player: JC Intal (Ateneo Blue Eagles)
- PSBank Maasahan (Dependable) Player: Ken Bono (Adamson Soaring Falcons)
- Coach of the Year: Pido Jarencio (UST Growling Tigers)
- Player of the Year: JC Intal (Ateneo Blue Eagles)
- Scoring Champion: Ken Bono (Adamson Soaring Falcons)
- Mr. Clutch: Jojo Duncil (UST Growling Tigers)
- Defensive Player: Jervy Cruz (UST Growling Tigers)
- Sixth Man: Dylan Ababou (UST Growling Tigers)
- Comeback Player: Chris Tiu (Ateneo Blue Eagles)
- Most Improved Player: Marvin Cruz (UP Fighting Maroons)
- Sportsmanship Award: Jeff Chan (FEU Tamaraws)
- Energy Player: Marcy Arellano (UE Red Warriors)

==== Statistical leaders ====
- Points: Kenneth Bono (Adamson, 21.8)
- Rebounds: Jervy Cruz (UST, 12.8)
- Assists: Japs Cuan (UST, 6.3)
- Blocks: Elmer Espiritu (UE, 2.1)
- Steals: Marvin Cruz (UP, 2.0)
- Turnovers: Bonbon Custodio (UE, 4.3)

=== Suspensions ===
- Jonathan Jankhe of the NU Bulldogs for shoving a closed fist against Vicmel Epres of the UP Fighting Maroons. Served one-game suspension against, ironically, the same team.
- Jojo Duncil of the UST Growling Tigers for headbutting Dave Catamora of the NU Bulldogs. Served one-game suspension against the Adamson Soaring Falcons.
- Ira Buyco of the UP Fighting Maroons for hitting Macky Escalona of the Ateneo Blue Eagles in the face on a rebound play. Served one-game suspension against the Adamson Soaring Falcons.
- UE suspended Bonifacio Custodio of the UE Red Warriors for disciplinary action. Served suspension on Game 2 of the semifinals against the UST Growling Tigers.
- Anthony Espiritu of the UST Growling Tigers was supposedly suspended on Game 3 of the Finals due to two flagrant fouls on Game 2 but was instead given a warning by the UAAP Board.

== Women's tournament ==
=== Elimination round ===
Pos	Team	W	L	PCT	GB	Qualification
1	UST Growling Tigresses	9	3	.750 (Note: Head-to-head point differential: UST +35, FEU –13, Ateneo –22; second-seed playoff: FEU 49–48 Ateneo)	—	Twice-to-beat in the semifinals
2	FEU Lady Tamaraws	9	3	.750	—	Twice-to-beat in the semifinals
3	Ateneo Lady Eagles	9	3	.750	—	Twice-to-win in the semifinals
4	UP Lady Maroons	7	5	.583	2	Twice-to-win in the semifinals
5	Adamson Lady Falcons	6	6	.500	3	
6	UE Lady Warriors (H)	2	10	.167	7	
7	NU Lady Bulldogs	0	12	.000	9	

Source: ABS-CBN Sports
Rules for classification: 1) winning percentage; 2) if tied for top 4 seeds, one-game playoff; 3) head-to-head record; 4) head-to-head point differential; 5) overall point differential
(H) Hosts

=== Second seed playoff ===
September 9

FEU Lady Tamaraws	49–48	Ateneo Lady Eagles
FEU wins the twice-to-beat advantage

Araneta Coliseum, Quezon City

=== Bracket ===
Semifinals (Top 2 twice-to-beat)
1	UST	64	78
4	UP	72	68
2	FEU	53	46
3	Ateneo	63	44

Finals (Best-of-three playoff)
1	UST	52	67	67
2	FEU	49	75	59

=== Semifinals ===
In the semifinals, the higher seed has the twice-to-beat advantage, where they only have to win once, while their opponents twice, to progress.

==== (1) UST vs. (4) UP ====
The UST Tigresses has the twice-to-beat advantage.

September 14

UST Growling Tigresses	64–72	UP Lady Maroons

PhilSports Arena, Pasig

September 17

UST Growling Tigresses	78–68	UP Lady Maroons
UST wins series in two games

Araneta Coliseum, Quezon City

==== (2) FEU vs. (3) Ateneo ====
The FEU Lady Tamaraws had the twice-to-beat advantage after beating the Ateneo Lady Eagles for the second-seed, which led to a virtual best-of-three playoff series.

September 14

FEU Lady Tamaraws	53–63	Ateneo Lady Eagles

PhilSports Arena, Pasig

September 17

FEU Lady Tamaraws	46–44	Ateneo Lady Eagles
FEU wins series in two games

Araneta Coliseum, Quezon City

=== Finals ===
September 21

UST Growling Tigresses	52–49	FEU Lady Tamaraws

Araneta Coliseum, Quezon City

September 24

UST Growling Tigresses	67–75	FEU Lady Tamaraws

Araneta Coliseum, Quezon City

September 30

UST Growling Tigresses	67–59	FEU Lady Tamaraws
UST wins series 2–1

Araneta Coliseum, Quezon City

=== Awards ===
UAAP Season 69 women's basketball champions
UST Growling Tigresses
11th title

- Most Valuable Player: Cassy Tioseco (Ateneo Lady Eagles)
- Rookie of the Year: Katherine Sandel (Adamson Lady Falcons)
- Mythical Five:
  - Cassy Tioseco (Ateneo Lady Eagles)
  - AJ Barracoso (Ateneo Lady Eagles)
  - Rem Buenacosa (UST Growling Tigresses)
  - Marichu Bacaro (UST Growling Tigresses)
  - Merenciana Arayi (Adamson Lady Falcons)

== Juniors' tournament ==
=== Elimination round ===
Pos	Team	W	L	PCT	GB	Qualification
1	Ateneo Blue Eaglets	12	0	1.000	—	Advance to the Finals (Note: As Ateneo won all of their elimination round games, the stepladder format will be used instead of the regular Final Four format.)
2	FEU–D Baby Tamaraws	10	2	.833	2	Twice-to-beat in stepladder round 2
3	UPIS Junior Fighting Maroons	7	5	.583	5	Proceed to stepladder round 1
4	Adamson Baby Falcons	6	6	.500	6	Proceed to stepladder round 1
5	UST Tiger Cubs	4	8	.333	8	
6	UE Junior Red Warriors (H)	2	10	.167	10	
7	NUNS Bullpups	1	11	.083	11	

Source: ABS-CBN Sports
Rules for classification: 1) winning percentage; 2) if tied for a top 4 seed, one-game playoff; 3) head-to-head record; 4) head-to-head point differential; 5) overall point differential
(H) Hosts

=== Bracket ===
Stepladder round 1 (Single-elimination)
3	UP	78
4	Adamson	84

Stepladder round 2 (No. 2 twice-to-beat)
2	FEU–FERN	76
4	Adamson	66

Finals (Best-of-three playoff)
1	Ateneo	55	73	69
2	FEU–FERN	67	65	61

=== Stepladder semifinals ===
==== (3) UPIS vs. (4) Adamson ====
This is a one-game playoff.

September 14

UPIS Junior Fighting Maroons	78–84	Adamson Baby Falcons

PhilSports Arena, Pasig

==== (2) FEU-FERN vs. (4) Adamson ====
FEU-FERN has the twice-to-beat advantage, where they only have to win once, while their opponents twice, to progress.

September 17

FEU–FERN Baby Tamaraws	76–66	Adamson Baby Falcons
FEU-FERN wins series in one game

Araneta Coliseum, Quezon City

=== Finals ===
This is a best-of-three playoff.

Studio 23

September 21

Ateneo Blue Eaglets	55–67	FEU–FERN Baby Tamaraws

Araneta Coliseum, Quezon City

Studio 23

September 24

Ateneo Blue Eaglets	73–65	FEU–FERN Baby Tamaraws

Araneta Coliseum, Quezon City

Studio 23

September 30

Ateneo Blue Eaglets	69–61	FEU–FERN Baby Tamaraws
Ateneo wins series 2–1

Araneta Coliseum, Quezon City

- Finals Most Valuable Player: Michael Gamboa (Ateneo Blue Eaglets)

=== Awards ===
UAAP Season 69 juniors' basketball champions
Ateneo Blue Eaglets
14th title

- Most Valuable Player: Bacon Austria (Ateneo Blue Eaglets)
- Rookie of the Year: Jeff Olalia (Adamson Baby Falcons)
- Mythical Five:
  - Bacon Austria (Ateneo Blue Eaglets)
  - Michael Gamboa (Ateneo Blue Eaglets)
  - Socrates Rivera (FEU–D Baby Tamaraws)
  - Mark Lopez (FEU–D Baby Tamaraws)
  - Erwin Duran (UE Junior Red Warriors)

== See also ==
- NCAA Season 82 basketball tournaments

Preceded by Season 68 (2005)	UAAP basketball seasons Season 69 (2006)	Succeeded by Season 70 (2007)
