= 2006 UST Growling Tigers basketball team =

2006 UST Growling Tigers men's basketball

UAAP Season 69 champions

Record
- Elims rank: #3
- Final rank: #1
- 2006 record: 11–7 (6–6 elims)
- Head coach: Alfredo Jarencio (1st season)
- Assistant coaches: Beaujing Acot; Emmanuel Calipes; Senen Dueñas; Julian Rabbi Tomacruz
- Captain: Allan Evangelista (5th season)

The 2006 UST Growling Tigers men's basketball team represented the University of Santo Tomas in the men's basketball tournament of the 69th season of the University Athletic Association of the Philippines.

The Tigers defeated the Blue Eagles of the Ateneo de Manila University to win their nineteenth UAAP men's title, and their first since the 1996 season. Jervy Cruz was selected on the Mythical Five, and Jojo Duncil was named as the Most Valuable Player of the Finals.

== Roster ==
No.	Pos	Name	Birthplace	Yr.	Remarks	Current Status
6	SF	Dylan Ababou	Leyte	2		Playing for TNT Tropang Texters
16	SF	Francis Philip Allera	General Santos	2		Last played for Kia Carnival
7	PF	Mark Angelo Canlas	Pampanga	2		Playing for Meralco Bolts
12	PG	Jose "June" Cortez	Pampanga	4		Graduated
20	PF/C	Jervy Cruz	Nueva Ecija	1	Elevated from Team B	Playing for Barangay Ginebra San Miguel
18	PG	John Paul "Japs" Cuan	Bicol	3		Graduated
10	C	Jun Dizon	Nueva Ecija	4		Last played in Philippine Basketball League
11	SG	Joselito "Jojo" Duncil	Pampanga	3	Last playing year	Last played for Barangay Ginebra San Miguel
8	SG	Anthony Espiritu	Manila	4		Last played in Philippine Basketball League
21	PF	Allan Evangelista (C)	Quezon City	5	Last playing year	Last played in Liga Pilipinas
9	SF	Mel Gile	Sydney	1		Graduated
5	PG	AC Marquez		1	Transferred to Team B	Graduated, training as a pilot
17	C	Chester Lloyd Taylor	Quezon	3		Graduated
14	SG	Jemal Vizcarra	Pampanga	5	Last playing year	Last played in Liga Pilipinas

- Head coach: Pido Jarencio
- Assistant coaches:
  - Beaujing Acot – defensive coach
  - Senen Duenas – offensive coach
  - Emmanuel Calipes – conditioning, endurance coach
  - Julian Rabbi Tomacruz – Liaison to UST Admin; Team B trainer, statistics
  - Edwin Escobar – Weights trainer
  - Rodil "Boy" Sablan – Academic Manager
- Team Physicians: Dr. Consuelo G. Suarez – Rehab Medicine, Sports Medicine
- Dr. Raul B. Palma – General Team Physician, neurosports medicine, team psychologist
- Institute of nutrition, Physical Therapy and Sports Medicine Interns - Arlene Chua
- Team manager: Timmy Chiong, Clarence Aytona, Rudy Yu, Hendric Hermida

== Preseason tournaments ==
After the expiration of head coach Nel Parado contract at the 2005 yearend, the university administration announced the hiring of former varsity and Ginebra San Miguel standout Pido Jarencio as the new head coach.

The Tigers participated in one off-season tournament: the Home and Away Invitational League (HAIL), where they were eliminated in the elimination round with a 3–4 record, good for fourth place, a game behind fourth seed Ateneo.

Date	Opponent	Score	Venue	Round
Jan 27	UE Red Warriors	W 81–74	UST Gym	HAIL Elimination round
Feb 3	@ San Beda Red Lions	L 70–74	San Beda Gym	HAIL Elimination round
Feb 15	@ FEU Tamaraws	L 69–83	FEU Gym	HAIL Elimination round
Feb 17	@ Lyceum Pirates	L 81–85	Lyceum Gym	HAIL Elimination round
Feb 20	De La Salle Green Archers	W 70–62	UST Gym	HAIL Elimination round
Mar 1	@ EAC Generals	W 90–74	EAC Gym	HAIL Elimination round
Mar 5	@ Ateneo Blue Eagles	L 90–97	Blue Eagle Gym	HAIL Elimination round
Record after the elimination round: 3 wins-4 losses (5th, out of the playoffs)

== Schedule ==
Due to the suspension of the De La Salle Green Archers, the league used a two-round, 12-game schedule, instead of the normal 14-game schedule.

Date	Opponent	Score	Venue	Round
Jul 9	UP Fighting Maroons	L 92–94	Ninoy Aquino Stadium	1st round
Jul 13	Adamson Soaring Falcons	Postponed	Ninoy Aquino Stadium	1st round
Jul 20	FEU Tamaraws	W 90–87	Ninoy Aquino Stadium	1st round
Jul 23	UE Red Warriors	W 91–77	Ninoy Aquino Stadium	1st round
Jul 29	NU Bulldogs	L 85–98	Ninoy Aquino Stadium	1st round
Aug 3	Adamson Soaring Falcons	L 62–74	Ninoy Aquino Stadium	1st round
Aug 6	Ateneo Blue Eagles	L 78–114	Araneta Coliseum	1st round
Record after the first round: 2 wins-4 losses (tied for 5th–7th)
Aug 13	UE Red Warriors	L 63–74	PhilSports Arena	2nd round
Aug 19	NU Bulldogs	W 75–67	PhilSports Arena	2nd round
Aug 24	FEU Tamaraws	W 77–75	Ninoy Aquino Stadium	2nd round
Aug 28	Ateneo Blue Eagles	W 88–80 (OT)	PhilSports Arena	2nd round
Aug 31	UP Fighting Maroons	L 67–70	Ninoy Aquino Stadium	2nd round
Sep 3	Adamson Soaring Falcons	W 77–74	PhilSports Arena	2nd round
Record after the second round: 6 wins-6 losses (tied for 3rd–4th)
Sep 14	Adamson Soaring Falcons	W 85–71	PhilSports Arena	Classification
Classification round record: 1 win-0 losses (promoted to 3rd seed)
Sep 17	UE Red Warriors	W 79–75	Araneta Coliseum	Semifinals
Sep 21	UE Red Warriors	W 82–81	Araneta Coliseum	Semifinals
Semifinal round record: 2 wins-0 losses (advanced to the Finals)
Sep 24	Ateneo Blue Eagles	L 72–73	Araneta Coliseum	Finals
Sep 28	Ateneo Blue Eagles	Postponed	Araneta Coliseum	Finals
Sep 30	Ateneo Blue Eagles	W 87–71	Araneta Coliseum	Finals
Oct 2	Ateneo Blue Eagles	W 76–74 (OT)	Araneta Coliseum	Finals
Final round record: 2 wins-1 loss (won 18th UAAP championship)

Notes: The July 14 game was postponed due to Tropical Storm Florita, while the September 28 game was postponed due to Typhoon Milenyo.

== Game summaries ==
=== First round ===
The Tigers were ranked at the start of the season as at the middle, with neither being held as a favorite or as a cellar-dweller. Popular collegiate sports website UBelt.com placed UST to be fourth.

==== UP Fighting Maroons ====
	1	2	3	4	Total
Fighting Maroons	23	22	21	28	94
Growling Tigers	21	22	21	28	92

A seesaw game all throughout, the Tigers were on the verge of victory when Fighting Maroon Marvin Cruz converted a jump shot at the top of the key, giving the Maroons the victory.

Rookie Jervy Cruz was the top scorer for UST with 16 points. Marvin Cruz (no relation) top scored for UP, with 25 points.

==== FEU Tamaraws ====
	1	2	3	4	Total
Tamaraws	20	24	16	27	87
Growling Tigers	19	28	21	22	90

The Tigers leaned on Dylan Ababou's three-point play with 8.6 seconds remaining to pull ahead of FEU for good.

Cruz and Duncil led all scorers with 25 points each. Duncil found a wide-open Ababou to cause the three-point play; the Tigers were ahead by 14 points but the Tamaraws fought back to tie at 87-all.

==== UE Red Warriors ====
	1	2	3	4	Total
Growling Tigers	16	31	24	20	91
Red Warriors	18	10	32	17	77

With a strong second quarter, the Tigers pulled away from season host UE as they dumped the Warriors at the Ninoy Aquino Stadium. Duncil and Cruz stepped up as they led a 32–10 run at the second quarter to give a comfortable cushion for the rest of the game.

Duncil scored 25 points, tying his career best. Cruz ended with a double-double of 22 points and ten rebounds.

==== NU Bulldogs ====
	1	2	3	4	Total
Bulldogs	32	27	22	17	98
Growling Tigers	15	28	16	26	85

Behind a strong outside presence, the NU Bulldogs repulsed the Growling Tigers in a high-scoring game. NU's one-two punch of Jonathan Fernandez and previous season's Mythical 5 awardee Edwin Asoro finished with a combined 44 points.

The Bulldogs converted 13 three-point field goals, a season record. Duncil made matters worse for the Tigers as he head-butted Dave Catamora with 52.9 seconds remaining.

==== Adamson Soaring Falcons ====
	1	2	3	4	Total
Growling Tigers	21	7	17	17	62
Soaring Falcons	19	19	18	18	74

Behind Adamson's run-and-gun offense, the Falcons made a big run at the second quarter to prevent the Tigers from catching up. Kenneth Bono, Leo Canuday and Roel Hugnatan stepped up for the Falcons as they scored a combined 59 points.

Ababou top scored for the Tigers with 19 points, Cruz earned another double-double, with 11 points and 13 rebounds. Duncil served his one-game suspension while Cuan was injured.

==== Ateneo Blue Eagles ====
	1	2	3	4	Total
Growling Tigers	27	9	11	31	78
Blue Eagles	28	35	27	24	114

Ateneo was assured of a first place at the end of the first round of eliminations, even though they were defeated in this game. However, the Eagles and the Tigers fought a close game, with Ateneo leading by a point at the end of the first quarter.

But it all changed in the second quarter as the Eagles pounced on the Tigers defense while limiting the Tigers in offense. By halftime, the game was over with Ateneo leading 63–36. All of the starters of Ateneo ended in double-figures, with Intal sharing game-high honors with Duncil, who was back from a one-game suspension, with 24 points.

Ateneo swept the first round of eliminations with an impressive 6–0 record.

=== Second round ===
The Tigers started the second round tied for last place, along with the UP Fighting Maroons, NU Bulldogs and defending champions FEU Tamaraws. The Eagles are at the top of the pack with a 6–0 record. Two games behind are the Red Warriors, followed by the Adamson.

==== UE Red Warriors ====
	1	2	3	4	Total
Red Warriors	11	24	19	20	74
Growling Tigers	14	10	24	15	63

Just like in the last three games, the Tigers managed to keep at pace with the Red Warriors, but as terrible second quarter let them down again. Only nine suited up for the Tigers, though, due to injuries and other ailments.

Cruz had another double-double performance with 17 points and 15 rebounds. James Martinez of UE led all scorers with 19 points.

==== NU Bulldogs ====
	1	2	3	4	Total
Bulldogs	21	19	13	14	67
Growling Tigers	15	17	19	24	75

With their Final Four aspirations jeopardized, the Tigers were in a must-win situation to have a chance to reach the semifinal round.

The Tigers started passively, allowing he Bulldogs to lead at halftime. But the Tigers, due to the efforts of Cruz and Cuan, caught up with the Bulldogs at the end of the third quarter. Ababou finished the business for the Tigers as they outscored NU 43–27 at the second half.

Cruz led all scorers with 18 points, and achieved his seventh double-double of the season, raking in 13 rebounds.

==== FEU Tamaraws ====
	1	2	3	4	Total
Tamaraws	21	18	17	19	75
Growling Tigers	22	20	20	15	77

Tied for fourth place, the Tigers are not out of the woods yet, especially at the logjam at the middle of table with Adamson, FEU and NU all having a chance of taking the last two semifinal berths – Ateneo and UE already clinched theirs.

Anthony Espiritu stepped up his game as he compensated to Duncil's and Cortez's absence due to injuries and ailments, chipping in a career-high and tournament-best 31 points to lead the Tigers into a season sweep of the defending champions.

The Tigers move up to third place with a 4–5 record. Jeff Chan topscored for FEU with 21 points. Cruz had another double-double, with 11 points and 11 rebounds.

=== Semifinals ===
After winning the classification game against Adamson, UST clinched the third seed, and the right to face the twice-to-beat UE Red Warriors in the semifinals.

==== First game ====
	1	2	3	4	Total
Growling Tigers	18	20	14	27	79
Red Warriors	14	18	17	26	75

Possessing the twice to beat advantage, the Warriors started passively, allowing UST to take the lead early on, with UST leading by six by halftime.

After the halftime break, the game was tightly contested; however UST pulled away at the middle of the third quarter, but with UE overtaking the Tigers, at the end of the third quarter, with UE leading, 44–40. UST would then play their own version of catching up, with the Thomasians staying within striking distance. In a game of attacks and counterattacks, the Tigers unleashed a 5–0 run, leading by as much as eight points.

The Warriors wouldn't lose easily, as they did their own 8–2 run, cutting the UST lead into two points. With 21.1 seconds left, June Cortez drove hardly to the basket scoring a fieldgoal, plus a personal foul. Cortez sank his bonus freethrow as the Red Warriors failed to erase a four-point lead, giving the Tigers the win, and another game at Season 69.

==== Second game ====
	1	2	3	4	Total
Red Warriors	17	21	26	17	81
Growling Tigers	23	20	24	15	82

With the season on the line, the Growling Tigers and the Red Warriors faced off anew for the right to meet the Ateneo Blue Eagles in the Finals; Ateneo did not need their twice-to-beat advantage as they edged out Adamson, 76–73.

Prior to the game, the Red Warriors announced the suspension of star player Bonifacio "Bonbon" Custodio due to disciplinary measures.

Just like in the first game, it was tightly contested, but unlike it, this wasn't a game of attacks and counter-attacks, as neither team led by double digits, although UST led for much of the way at the first half.

In the second half, UST began creating inroads to the UE defense, leading by as much as fourteen. UE struck hard at the endgame, and led by five points. With the game on the line, Jojo Duncil, converted a fieldgoal off a Jervy Cruz put-back, plus a foul. Duncil converted his bonus freethrow to set up a thrilling last 53.8 seconds, with UST on the lead 82–79.

On the inbound play after the Duncil freethrow, Warriors Team Captain Robert Labagala drove unmolested into the basket, cutting the lead into one point. Trying to seal the game, the Tigers committed a turnover, and with no timeouts on both sides, the Red Warriors sprinted onto their frontcourt. With UST's transition defense sprinting along, Jorel Canizares managed to attempt a jumpshot on the right quartercourt. The shot bounced off the rim, with Canizares getting his own rebound. He missed his shot yet again, when UE captain Rob Labagala getting the rebound as time expired.

The Thomasians go into their first UAAP men's basketball Finals since 1999. The Warriors were booted out of the semifinals yet again, the third time since the Final Four era when they acquired the twice-to-beat incentive.

=== Finals ===
The Finals series between UST and Ateneo favored the Blue Eagles, as they have figured in more playoff games, and had a championship experience. UST was the underdog in the series.

It would be the first time that the Tigers and the Eagles met in a UAAP men's basketball final; the last time they have met was in the 1931 NCAA season where the Blue and White dethroned the Gold and White.

==== Game one ====
	1	2	3	4	Total
Growling Tigers	15	20	22	15	72
Blue Eagles	19	16	22	16	73

With several lead changes, the ga came on to the final two possessions. With Ateneo leading by one point, 71–70, J.C. Intal of Ateneo committed a backing violation. UST coach Pido Jarencio then called a timeout to design a play. After the timeout, Jervy Cruz had a hard time penetrating the Blue Eagle defense. He kicked out the ball to a tightly guarded Allan Evangelista. With Doug Kramer covering him, Evangelista converted a fadeaway jumper, to put UST up, 72–71, with one second remaining.

Ateneo head coach Norman Black (a former varsity player of St. Joseph's University in Philadelphia) sued for time. Devising one the plays he previously used the head coach of the professional team San Miguel Beermen, he instructed Chris Tiu to set a pick for Doug Kramer in order to free him from his defender right under the basket. Tigers coach Pido Jarencio (who used to play for Norman Black on his rookie year at San Miguel Beer, and was a Glowing Goldie, the Tigers previous moniker) instructed his boys to implement the man-to-man defense.

Macky Escalona inbounded the ball from the left side of center line. With Tiu setting a pick that separated Japs Cuan from defending Doug Kramer, Escalona passed the ball to the free Kramer and calmly converted his fieldgoal attempt, sending the Ateneo fans into pandemonium.

==== Game two ====
	1	2	3	4	Total
Blue Eagles	20	18	19	14	71
Growling Tigers	21	27	17	22	87

The second game was originally scheduled for September 28, but due to Typhoon Milenyo causing a direct hit to Metro Manila by the time of the game, the UAAP Board rescheduled the second game to September 30, at the Araneta Coliseum.

At the first quarter, the Tigers got off to a hot start, but Ateneo rallied. However, as the quarter concluded, the Tigers hanged on to a one-point lead. The Eagles would lose steam as bad plays and turnovers ruined their offensive flow, while the Tigers began hitting outside shots and grabbing offensive rebounds to negate the Eagles' zone defense. The Eagles would remain within striking distance thanks to J.C. Intal, but without support from his teammates, Intal's one-man show was not enough as Tigers Dylan Ababou and Jojo Duncil both surpassed the twenty-point barrier, leading into an easy 16-point win.

==== Game three ====
	1	2	3	4	OT	Total
Growling Tigers	15	16	20	13	12	76
Blue Eagles	17	20	13	14	10	74

UST opened the game with a 4–0 lead, barely two minutes into the game, before Ateneo countered, using a 6–2 run, with Macky Escalona's fastbreak lay-up to tie the game at 6. Later on, with the game tied at 10, Ateneo ran off five straight points to grab a 15–10 lead, with 3:07 left in the first. The Tigers rallied with a 5–2 burst, cutting Ateneo's lead to two at the end of the quarter.

The Blue Eagles started with a 10–4 run to open the second quarter, stretching the lead to eight, 27–19, as well as putting UST in the penalty. The Tigers misfired on their field goals, and their four points were all from the free throw line during this stretch. The Tigers regrouped, rallying to within three at 34–31, before Ken Barracoso hit a three with less than a minute to go in the half, giving Ateneo a 37–31 lead, which they maintained until halftime.

UST came out scorching in the third quarter, opening the second half with a 10–0 blitz to grab a 41–37 spread. Dylan Ababou started the burst with a triple from the right wing, then after Clifford Arao turned the ball over in Ateneo's next possession, Jun Cortes found Jervy Cruz under the basket for a lay-up that cut ADMU's lead to one.

The Tigers continued to pour it on, scoring five more unanswered points to grab a 41–37 lead, before the Eagles stopped the bleeding with a lay-up by Escalona. However, the Tigers were not done, going on another 7–0 run to stretch their lead to nine, 48–39 with 4:52 left, forcing Ateneo to call a timeout.

Ateneo came out aggressive from the timeout, drawing fouls and putting UST in penalty. Cruz, Evangelista, and Duncil were all in foul trouble with 3 each, slowing down their offense, and giving Ateneo more momentum. The Eagles ran off five straight points, and after the Tigers stopped the bleeding, Escalona fired a three-point shot with 1:13 remaining, then after UST came up empty again, drove into the lane from the left wing, converting a lay-up which pushed Ateneo to within 49–51. As the Tigers misfired on their free throws, Ateneo took advantage of this, finishing the quarter with an 11–3 windup, drawing them to within one at the end of the third, 51–50.

Neither team could score in the first 3:35 of the quarter until Ababou hit an awkward shot that gave UST the first points of the fourth, as well as a three-point spread. Ateno countered with its four points of its own, and Doug Kramer's basket with 4:46 left gave them back the lead for the first time since early in the third quarter. JC Intal missed two free throws, and Allan Evangelista hit a jumper to swing the lead back to UST.

After both teams traded baskets, however, Evangelista fouled out on UST's next possession, and Intal hit a three-pointer, giving the Eagles a 59–57 lead, which Escalona stretched to four later on with a jumper. Duncil then sank a jumper of his own off a crossover dribble to pull the Tigers within two, setting the stage for the crucial final minute and a half of regulation.

With less than a minute and a half left in the fourth quarter and his team leading by two, JC Intal drove past Dylan Ababou, drawing Jervy Cruz' fifth and last foul, converting the basket, and setting himself up for a three-point play. After sending Cruz to the bench for good, Intal converted the free throw to give the Blue Eagles a five-point lead, 64–59 with about a minute remaining.

With two of UST's main players out of the game and a five-point lead with just over a minute remaining in regulation, Ateneo appeared to be in a strong position to win the game. However, UST reduced the deficit and the game continued.

On UST's next possession, Anthony Espiritu faked his defender into the air then drained a critical triple to draw the Tigers to within two, with just over a minute left in the fourth. Intal drove to the basket in Ateneo's next play, but he missed the shot, and the rebound was controlled by Duncil. On the Tigers' possession, Intal committed a foul, giving UST an inbounds play with clock reading 43.5 seconds. Ateneo then used out of its two timeouts.

Duncil caught the pass out of the inbound, but then missed a rushed layup from the right side. However, Mark Canlas grabbed the rebound and scored on a putback to tie the game at 64, with 37.3 seconds left in regulation. The Eagles, opting not to call their final timeout, brought the ball upcourt and isolated Intal at the top of the key. Intal drove into the lane but again missed his lay-up, and the ball was tipped to Duncil. He could not control the rebound, however, and Intal was able to force him to turn the ball over. With only 21 seconds remaining, Ateneo called a timeout to set up their final offensive play of regulation.

Intal inbounded the ball to Escalona, who waited until about 11 seconds left before passing it to Chris Tiu, who in turn passed it to Intal on the left wing. He drove into the lane once more, but he again missed the shot, and Japs Cuan threw up a halfcourt shot that missed as time expired. Game 3 had gone into overtime.

Both teams started off cold in the overtime period, unable to score on their initial possessions. After Doug Kramer missed a shot on Ateneo's second possession, Japs Cuan brought the ball up and was fouled by Yuri Escueta. Since both teams were in the penalty, this sent UST's floor general to the free throw line. Cuan split his free throws, giving the Tigers a one-point lead.

Ateneo came up empty again on their next play, then Kramer fouled June Dizon on UST's possession. Dizon, though, missed both free throws, and Escalona hit another three, giving him 26 points and the Eagles their first lead of the period. Duncil answered right away with a jumper to tie the game again, then after Intal turned the ball over on Ateneo's next possession, Cuan was fouled anew, and once again split his free throws.

On the Eagles next possession, Escalona faked his defender into the air then drove into the lane for a difficult lay-up to give the Eagles back the lead, 69–68. Duncil tried to answer on the Tigers' next possession, but he air-balled a three-pointer. Duncil though, chased down his own miss, and drew a foul from Chris Tiu. He then knocked in both shots to swing the lead back to his team.

After Escalona missed a three, Ababou stole Kramer's pass and brought the ball into UST's attack zone. Duncil faked off Barracoso behind the three-point arc, then dribbled closer to sink another jumper which gave the Tigers a three-point lead, 72–69, with just over a minute remaining. As the yellow side of the arena grew louder, Chris Tiu sank a three-pointer of his own off an assist pass from JC Intal to tie the game again at 72, forcing UST to call a timeout with 55 seconds left.

The Tigers ran an isolation play for Duncil in the right wing against Escalona. Duncil drove into the lane, faked Escalona into the air, then drained yet another jumper to give UST a two-point lead. Intal answered on Ateneo's next play, driving into the lane and laying it in, tying the game anew at 74. The Eagles defended Duncil well on the next play, forcing him to give up the ball to Jun Cortes, who missed an open three. But Ateneo could not control the rebound, and Dylan Ababou grabbed it, drawing a foul in the process. Ababou missed his first free throw, but made the second, giving UST the slimmest of margins, with time down to 12.5 seconds. The Eagles called their last timeout to set up their final offensive play.

Barracoso inbounded to Intal, who called for an isolation at the top of the key against Ababou. He drove past Ababou, but missed a short bank shot. As Intal went up for his own miss, Cuan tied him up, forcing a jumpball, with the possession arrow pointing at UST. The Tigers then inbounded to Jun Cortes, who was fouled immediately. Cortes made the first free throw, giving UST a two-point lead, 76–74, with 3.7 seconds left. The second free throw rattled out, and the ball was tipped to Jai Reyes, who missed a desperation heave at the buzzer.

Macky Escalona topscored for the Blue Eagles with 26 points, while Jojo Duncil led the Tigers' charge with 18.

=== Summary ===
2006 UST Growling Tigers basketball team
Men's Finals	G1	G2	G3	Wins
Ateneo Blue Eagles	73	71	74	1
UST Growling Tigers	72	87	76	2
- Duration: September 24 to October 2
- Arena(s): Araneta Coliseum
- Finals MVP: Jojo Duncil
- TV network(s): Studio 23 and TFC

== Aftermath ==
The celebrations at the campus began at the moment of UST's victory on October 2. The main celebrations were held on October 4, started by a thanksgiving holy mass at 5 pm, celebrated by incoming Fr. Ernesto Arceo, O.P., followed by parties, a dinner, and a 10-minute fireworks display seen over much of Sampaloc, Manila.

The night was capped off by a concert (7 pm) with the Thomasian pop band Callalily, Thomasian alumna and bossa nova singer Sofia, Soapdish, and to chill and wrap up the night, the Atenean band Parokya ni Edgar and UP band Kamikazee. Heavy rains in the end, however, dampened the smooth flow of the programme.

The winning team will reportedly head to the Great Wall of China as a reward for their championship, as promised by the acting rector

After the championship celebrations, PLDT, whose president is Manny Pangilinan, a known Ateneo supporter, released a radio advertisement, where the ad depicts a play-by-play basketball sequence, with the commentator outlining a UST three-point play, and at the climax, the commentator retorts, "Who cares?" which then promotes a new PLDT product. After the promotion, the commentator comes back and says, "Game over, who won?"

The following year, the Tigers entered the playoff round by beating FEU in a rubber match. In the stepladder round, they lose to the Eagles who sought revenge on their defeat in the finals. They would lose key players like Cortez and Espiritu following next year.

In season 71, the Tigers with high expectations finished at 6–8 and not making to the Final Four for the first time in Pido Jarencio's tenure as coach. They also lose 6 key players from the championship team to graduation leaving Dylan Ababou as the sole member of the 2006 championship team next year.

== Post-season tournaments ==
As semifinalists of the UAAP, the Tigers qualified for the Collegiate Champions League. With the seedings determined before their championship, they were seeded third, behind first seed Ateneo and second seed San Beda, the NCAA champion.

Date	Opponent	Score	Venue	Round
Oct 9	JRU Heavy Bombers	L 63–65	UST Gym	CCL Round of 16
Tournament record: 0 wins-1 loss (eliminated at the first round)

	1	2	3	4	Total
Heavy Bombers	18	12	20	15	65
Growling Tigers	24	15	22	2	63

The Tigers' round of 16 assignment was against the JRU Heavy Bombers, which finished tied for sixth in NCAA Season 82. The Tigers practically led for much of the game when June Dizon and Mel Gile were ejected at the second quarter. The Tigers regained their composure but the Heavy Bombers cut the lead, culminating two freethrows by Heavy Bomber Mark Cagoco with 1:56 left at the second quarter, giving JRU the lead, 65–63. The teams never scored again as the UAAP champions were eliminated from the tournament.

The Tigers are participated in the 2006–07 Philippine Basketball League Silver Cup as the Kettle Corn Pop Kings. Kettle Corn is a popcorn snack sold by the RFM Corporation. The members of team also includes non-Thomasians. The Pop Kings finished last in the classification round, and was eliminated by Magnolia Ice Cream Spinners (with most players coming from NCAA champions San Beda Red Lions) 133–128 in triple overtime at the first round of the playoffs.

== Awards ==
- Men's basketball champions: UAAP Season 69
- Mythical Five: Jervy Cruz
- Finals Most Valuable Player: Jojo Duncil
