= UAAP Season 69 swimming championships =

The UAAP Season 69 swimming competitions were contested from September 21 to September 24, 2006 at the Rizal Memorial Swimming Pool. There were four titles given, one for each division: Men's, Women's, Boys' and Girls'.

The University of the Philippines (UP) Maroon Tankers retained the title for the fourth consecutive year in Men's division, while the University of Santo Tomas (UST) Lady Tigersharks earned its third straight tiara in the Women's.

The Ateneo de Manila High School (AHS) Blue Eaglets claimed another championship in the Boys' division, while the University of the Philippines Integrated School (UPIS) Junior Lady Tankers took their first-ever UAAP title in the Girls'.

== See also ==
- UAAP Season 69
