= 2007 PBA draft =

Player selection in Philippine basketball

General information
- Date: August 19, 2007
- Time: 4:00 pm
- Location: Market! Market!, Taguig
- Network: ABC

Overview
- League: Philippine Basketball Association
- First selection: Joe Devance, Welcoat Dragons

The 2007 Philippine Basketball Association (PBA) rookie draft was an event at which teams drafted players from the amateur ranks. The event was held at Market! Market! in Taguig on August 19, 2007. The Welcoat Dragons drafted Joe Devance of the University of Texas at El Paso and Toyota-Balintawak Road Kings to be the #1 draft pick.

== Round 1 ==
PG	Point guard	SG	Shooting guard	SF	Small forward	PF	Power forward	C	Center	*	Mythical team member	^{#}	All-star

Pick	Player	Country of origin*	PBA team	College
1	Joe Devance*	United States	Welcoat Dragons	Texas-El Paso
2	Samigue Eman	Philippines	Magnolia Beverage Masters (from Coca-Cola Tigers)	U of Mindanao
3	Ryan Reyes^{#}	United States	Sta. Lucia Realtors	Cal State Fullerton
4	JC Intal^{#}	Philippines	Air21 Express (from Coca-Cola Tigers via Air21 Express)	Ateneo
5	Doug Kramer	Philippines	Air21 Express (from Purefoods Tender Juicy Giants)	Ateneo
6	Ken Bono	Philippines	Alaska Aces	Adamson
7	J.R. Quiñahan^{#}	Philippines	Alaska Aces (from Red Bull Barako)	UV
8	Yousif Aljamal	Philippines	Air21 Express (to be returned to Talk 'N Text Phone Pals)	San Beda
9	Jonas Villanueva^{#}	Philippines	Magnolia Beverage Masters (from Barangay Ginebra Kings)	FEU
10	Macky Escalona	Philippines	Barangay Ginebra Kings	Ateneo

== Round 2 ==
Pick	Player	Country of origin*	PBA team	College
11	Ronjay Buenafe	Philippines	Sta. Lucia Realtors (from Coca-Cola Tigers)	EAC
12	Ryan Araña	Philippines	Welcoat Dragons	De La Salle
13	Melvin Mamaclay	Philippines	Sta. Lucia Realtors	Adamson
14	Marvin Cruz	Philippines	Air21 Express	UP Diliman
15	Jojo Duncil	Philippines	Red Bull Barako (from Purefoods Tender Juicy Giants)	UST
16	Ardy Larong	Philippines	Alaska Aces	USJ-R
17	PASSED			
18	PASSED			
19	PASSED			
20	RJ Masbang	Philippines	Air21 Express (from Magnolia Beverage Masters)	UE

Red Bull's two picks (supposedly 17th and 19th), and Talk 'N Text (supposedly 18th) were passed.

== Draft-day trades ==
- Purefoods traded its second-round draft pick to Red Bull.
- Red Bull acquired Mark Andaya from Air21.
- Welcoat traded Junjun Cabatu for Alaska's Nic Belasco.
- Talk 'N Text acquired Yousif Aljamal from Air21.

== Undrafted players ==
Draftee's name followed by college. All undrafted players become free agents.

- Joel Solis from (Philippine Christian)
- Joferson Gonzales (Mapua)
- Jeff Bombeo from (San Beda)
- Edilgusto Soriano from (San Beda)
- Khiel Misa from (Perpetual Help)
- Chico Manabat from (NU)
- Chris Baluyot (San Sebastian)
  - Signed by Air21 Express as a free agent for the 2007-08 PBA season.
- Ronnie Zagala from (FEU)
- Francis Barcellano from (FEU)
  - Signed by Talk 'N Text Phone Pals as a free agent for the 2007-08 PBA season.
- Elbert Alberto from (Assumption - Pampanga)
- J.R. Aquino (De La Salle)
  - Signed by the Barangay Ginebra Kings as a free agent for the 2007-08 PBA season.
- Alex Angeles from (San Beda)
- Reed Juntilla from (UV)
  - Signed by Barako Bull Energy Boosters as a free agent for the 2008 PBA Fiesta Conference.
- Frederick Hubalde from (UST)
- Ramil Tagupa from (Adamson)
- Wynsjohn Te from (JRU)
- Mark Legarde from (San Sebastian) / (FEATI)
- Gilbert Neo from (NU)
- James Zablan from (FEU)
- Roberto Rivera
- Kenneth Co Yu Kang from (JRU)
- Rolly Menor from (St. Benilde)
- Tristan Veranga from (Mapua)
- Daryl Pepito from (St. Edward's (Australia))
- Donald Tadena from (Holy Cross - Davao) / (Rizal Tech)
- Dominador Javier from (Perpetual Help)
- Mark Moreno from (U of Mindanao)

=== Players scrapped from the list ===
- Jeff Chan of FEU withdrew his application.

== Note ==
*All aspirants are Filipinos until proven otherwise.
