= Jojo Duncil =

Filipino basketball player (born 1983)

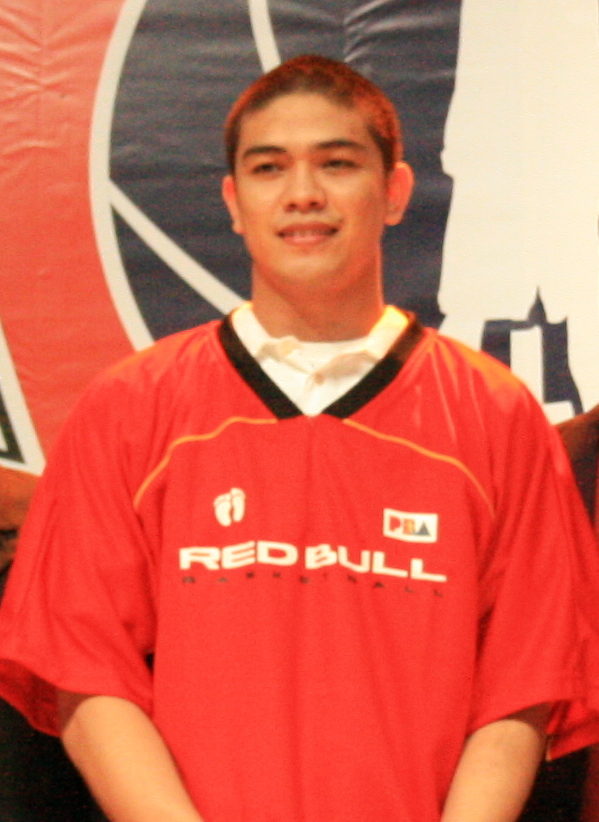
- Duncil in 2007

Personal information
- Born: January 13, 1983 (age 43) Apalit, Pampanga, Philippines
- Listed height: 6 ft 1 in (1.85 m)
- Listed weight: 178 lb (81 kg)

Career information
- College: UST
- PBA draft: 2007: 2nd round, 15th overall pick
- Drafted by: Red Bull Barako
- Playing career: 2007–2019
- Position: Shooting guard / point guard

Career history
- 2007–2011: Barako Bull Energy Boosters
- 2011: San Miguel Beermen / Petron Blaze Boosters
- 2011–2012: Shopinas.com Clickers / Air21 Express
- 2012–2013: San Miguel Beermen
- 2013: Barako Bull Energy Cola
- 2013–2014: San Miguel Beermen
- 2014–2015: GlobalPort Batang Pier
- 2018: Quezon City Capitals
- 2018: Mandaluyong El Tigre
- 2018–2019: Navotas Clutch / Uni-Pak Sardines

Career highlights
- PBA champion (2011 Governors'); UAAP champion (2006); UAAP Finals MVP (2006)

Joselito Duncil (born January 13, 1983) is a Filipino former professional basketball player. He was drafted 15th overall by Red Bull in 2007. Duncil previously played for the University of Santo Tomas Growling Tigers from 2004 to 2006 in the UAAP where he helped UST win their first championship since 1996 in his final year as a Tiger, winning the Finals MVP award in the process.

== College career ==
Duncil first played for University of Santo Tomas Growling Tigers in 2004 after making the team as a walk-on. The Tigers failed to make it to the playoffs in Duncil's first year, with him playing a minor role in the rotation. In 2005, the Tigers again missed the playoffs, having an even worse record than the previous year. He had a bigger role on the team, averaging 12.7 points a game that season.

In 2006 Duncil and new player Jervy Cruz emerged as the go-to guys for the Tigers as they barely made it to the playoffs, scoring 20 points or more in three of their first four games. Duncil himself missed four games either due to suspension or illness. In the playoff for the third seed, Duncil scored 13 points against the Adamson Falcons to help UST clinch the #3 seed and set up a semifinal series against the UE Red Warriors who had the twice-to-beat advantage. In the semifinals, Duncil scored 13 points to help UST force a do-or-die game for the last finals berth. Duncil completed a pivotal three-point play in the dying seconds of the do-or-die game off Cruz's missed shot to put UST up for good and enter the finals for the first time since 1999.

In Game 1 of the finals, Duncil had a cold night with 9 points as the top seed Ateneo Blue Eagles squeaked past the Tigers with a buzzer-beater lay-up by Doug Kramer to seize a 1–0 series lead. In Game 2, Duncil scored 20 points as UST blew out Ateneo to set up the winner-take-all game 3. In that game, Duncil top-scored for the Growling Tigers with 18 points, helping the Tigers cope up with Jervy Cruz fouling out at the end of the fourth quarter in the overtime. For his efforts, Duncil was named as the UAAP Finals MVP.

Duncil was supposed to suit up for the Tigers in his final year of eligibility in 2007 but it was revealed that Duncil has a birth certificate certifying him that he was born on January 13, 1982, causing him to be ineligible for 2007, since UAAP rules only allow people under 25 years old to play. Duncil previously submitted a birth certificate to both the league and UST saying he was born in 1983. This caused UST to drop him from the 2007 lineup, and Duncil signed up for the 2007 PBA Draft.

Duncil revealed that he was really born in 1983, but when the original copy from the Apalit, Pampanga civil registrar was lost, the new document showed a wrong year of birth. Duncil initiated court proceedings to correct the error in Apalit.

== Professional career ==
=== Red Bull Barako / Barako Bull Energy Boosters ===
He was the only draft pick of Red Bull in the 2007 PBA Draft, and the only draft pick from the 2006 UST Growling Tigers championship team for that year. In 2008, he scored a career-high 18 points in a win over Barangay Ginebra.

=== San Miguel Beermen / Petron Blaze Boosters ===
In the offseason, he was signed by the Petron Blaze Boosters. He helped the Boosters win the 2011 PBA Governors Cup over Talk 'N Text, stopping the latter's attempt for a Grand Slam.

=== Shopinas.com Clickers / Air21 Express ===
Duncil began the 2011–12 season as a member of the Shopinas.com Clickers. He scored 22 points against his former team, but it wasn't enough as they started the 2011–12 Philippine Cup 0–3. He got a new career-high of 23 points against the Rain or Shine Elasto Painters, but it wasn't enough as they fell to their 13th straight loss, matching the all-time worst start in any conference.

They had a better start in the Commissioner's Cup, starting with two wins in their first four games. He then made six clutch free throws against the Alaska Aces as they won back-to-back games for the first time that season. That would be his most productive conference in the PBA, as he started all nine games for them and averaged 9.9 points, 3.1 rebounds, and 1.4 assists.

=== 2nd stint with San Miguel ===
Two games into the Governors' Cup, Duncil got traded back to the Boosters in exchange for Wynne Arboleda.

=== Barako Bull Energy Cola ===
Duncil was then part of a 5-team, 10-player trade that sent him to the Barako Bull Energy Cola.

=== 3rd stint with San Miguel ===
As a free agent, Duncil signed with San Miguel for the 2013–14 season.

=== GlobalPort Batang Pier ===
A free agent once again, Duncil joined the GlobalPort Batang Pier.

=== Quezon City Capitals ===
After his stint with GlobalPort, Duncil returned home to Pampanga and set up a trucking business. He didn't play professional basketball for four years until he got the call to play for the Quezon City Capitals. To get into playing shape, he had to lose 40 pounds. He helped them get their first win of the season by leading them with 14 points against GenSan Warriors. Against the Valenzuela Classic, he scored 25 points for their second win.

=== Mandaluyong El Tigre ===
From the dispersal draft held that year, the Mandaluyong El Tigre were able to select Duncil. He was only able to play one game for them before he became a free agent once again.

=== Navotas Clutch ===
The Navotas Clutch then signed Duncil.

== Player profile ==
Duncil's strengths are known to be his outside shooting and work ethic. He could guard three positions from point guard to small forward and score from the midrange.

== PBA career statistics ==
Legend
GP	Games played	MPG	Minutes per game
FG%	Field-goal percentage	3P%	3-point field-goal percentage	FT%	Free-throw percentage
RPG	Rebounds per game	APG	Assists per game	SPG	Steals per game
BPG	Blocks per game	PPG	Points per game	**Bold**	Career high

=== Season-by-season averages ===
Year	Team	GP	MPG	FG%	3P%	FT%	RPG	APG	SPG	BPG	PPG
2007–08	Red Bull	33	15.3	.410	.262	.607	2.3	1.2	.4	.0	6.4
2008–09	Red Bull / Barako Bull	29	16.0	.471	.394	.754	2.2	1.1	.6	.0	6.7
2009–10	Barako Bull / Barako Energy Coffee	26	20.2	.369	.217	.724	2.6	1.3	.2	.0	6.6
2010–11	Barako Bull	30	11.9	.323	.200	.786	1.8	1.0	.2	.0	2.9
2010–11	San Miguel / Petron Blaze	30	11.9	.323	.200	.786	1.8	1.0	.2	.0	2.9
2011–12	Shopinas.com / Air21	23	22.7	.367	.062	.743	3.5	1.8	.5	.0	9.0
2011–12	Petron Blaze	23	22.7	.367	.062	.743	3.5	1.8	.5	.0	9.0
2012–13	Petron Blaze	17	9.2	.513	.000	.444	1.2	.6	.6	.1	2.5
2012–13	Barako Bull	17	9.2	.513	.000	.444	1.2	.6	.6	.1	2.5
2013–14	San Miguel	26	5.9	.390	.333	.500	.4	.5	.4	.0	1.5
2014–15	GlobalPort	2	11.0	—	—	—	.0	.0	.0	.0	.0
Career		186	14.5	.395	.256	.695	2.0	1.1	.4	.0	5.1
