= NCAA Season 82 =

- Host school: De La Salle-College of Saint Benilde
- Tagline: "Proud and True at 82: Blazing Beyond Limits"

General
- Seniors: PCU Dolphins
- Juniors: San Sebastian Staglets

Seniors' champions
Sport		Men	Women
Basketball		San Beda	N/A
Volleyball		PCU	San Sebastian
Swimming		San Beda	
Chess		PCU	
Table tennis		PCU	

Juniors' champions
Sport		Boys	Girls
Basketball		San Sebastian	N/A
Volleyball		San Sebastian	
Swimming		LSGH	
Chess		PCU	
Table tennis		LSGH	
- (NT) = No tournament; (DS) = Demonstration Sport; (Ex) = Exhibition;

Blazie, the mascot of the 82nd season of the NCAA.

NCAA Season 82 is the 2006–07 season of the National Collegiate Athletic Association in the Philippines.

The start of the basketball competition is scheduled at June 24 at the Araneta Coliseum.

De La Salle-College of Saint Benilde is the host of the 2006–07 season, with this year's theme “Proud and True at 82: Blazing Beyond Limits.”

== Basketball ==
=== Seniors' tournament ===
==== Elimination round ====
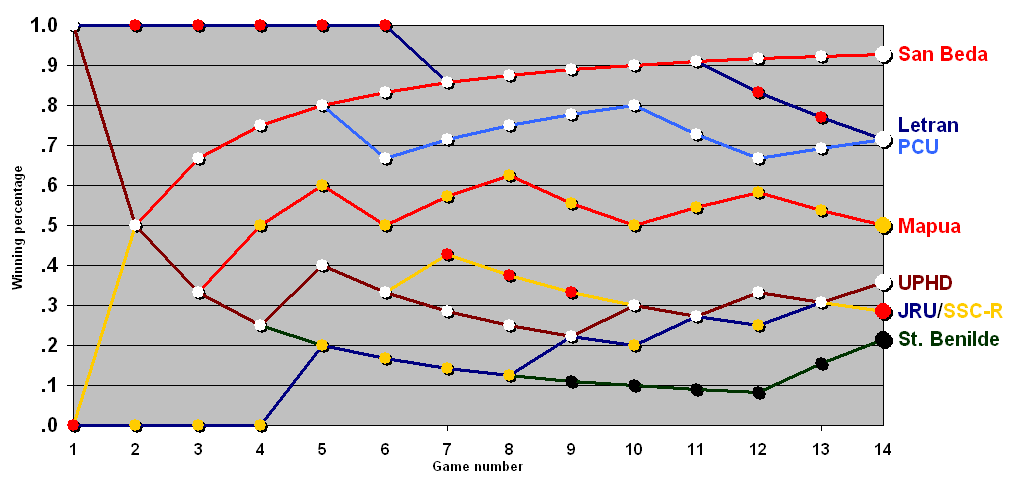
Team standings progression in the senior's basketball tournament.

Pos	Team	W	L	PCT	GB	Qualification
1	San Beda Red Lions	13	1	.929	—	Twice-to-beat in the semifinals
2	PCU Dolphins	10	4	.714 (Note: Second-seed playoff: PCU 67–62 Letran)	3	Twice-to-beat in the semifinals
3	Letran Knights	10	4	.714	3	Twice-to-win in the semifinals
4	Mapúa Cardinals	7	7	.500	6	Twice-to-win in the semifinals
5	Perpetual Altas	5	9	.357	8	
6	JRU Heavy Bombers	4	10	.286 (Note: Head-to-head record: JRU 1–1 San Sebastian (JRU +4))	9	
7	San Sebastian Stags	4	10	.286	9	
8	Benilde Blazers (H)	3	11	.214	10	

Source: ABS-CBN Sports
Rules for classification: 1) winning percentage; 2) if tied for top 4, one-game playoff; 3) head-to-head record; 4) head-to-head goal average; 5) overall point differential
(H) Hosts
Notes:

NBI agents were present in the Ninoy Aquino Stadium, monitoring the basketball games. Rumours still persist that there were still efforts of game fixing in the games. The suspects "resurfaced" during the first round game between the Blazers and the Heavy Bombers, the day where the agents were supposedly absent.

==== Bracket ====
Semifinals (Top 2 twice-to-beat)
1	San Beda	55
4	Mapúa	51
2	PCU	72
3	Letran	50

Finals (Best-of-three playoff)
1	San Beda	71	50	68
2	PCU	57	72	67

=== Awards ===
2006 Seniors' Basketball Champion
San Beda
Twelfth title

Samuel Ekwe got four out of five awards given by the NCAA Press Corps:

- Most Valuable Player: (Nigeria) Samuel Ekwe (San Beda)
- Most Valuable Player (Finals): (Philippines) Yousif Aljamal (San Beda)
- Rookie of the Year: (Nigeria) Samuel Ekwe (San Beda)

=== Juniors' tournament ===
==== Elimination round ====
Pos	Team	W	L	PCT	GB	Qualification
1	PCU Baby Dolphins	9	3	.750	—	Twice-to-beat in the semifinals
2	San Sebastian Staglets	9	3	.750	—	Twice-to-beat in the semifinals
3	San Beda Red Cubs	9	3	.750	—	Twice-to-win in the semifinals
4	JRU Light Bombers	6	6	.500	3	Twice-to-win in the semifinals
5	La Salle Green Hills Greenies (H)	5	7	.417	4	
6	Perpetual Altalettes	4	8	.333	5	
7	Letran Squires	0	12	.000	9	

Source: ABS-CBN Sports
Rules for classification: 1) winning percentage; 2) if tied for top 4, one-game playoff; 3) head-to-head record; 4) head-to-head point differential; 5) overall point differential
(H) Hosts

==== Bracket ====
Semifinals (Top 2 twice-to-beat)
1	PCU	67
4	JRU	66
2	San Sebastian	61
3	San Beda	52

Finals (Best-of-three playoff)
1	PCU	55	41
2	San Sebastian	57	65

=== Awards ===
2006 Juniors' Basketball Champion
San Sebastian
Third title

Elvin Jake Pascual won the MVP award in the Juniors' division, He made history as the first Juniors player to sweep MVP, Rookie of the Year, Mythical Five, and Most Defensive Player awards in a single season

- Most Valuable Player: (Philippines) Elvin Pascual (PCU)
- Rookie of the Year: (Philippines) Elvin Pascual (PCU)

== Volleyball tournaments ==
- Seniors' Division:
  - Men's tournament: PCU Dolphins def. Letran Knights
    - Most Outstanding Player: Eric John O. Genil (PCU)
    - Coach of the Year: Gilbert L. Ordon (PCU)
  - Women's tournament: San Sebastian Lady Stags def. Letran Lady Knights
    - Most Outstanding Player: Joy H. Pulido (SSC-R)
    - Coach of the Year: Rogelio G. Gorayeb (SSC-R)
- Juniors' Division: San Sebastian Staglets def. UPHSD Altalettes
  - Most Outstanding Player: Nelson P. Rivera, Jr. (SSC-R)
  - Coach of the Year: Rogelio G. Gorayeb (SSC-R)

== Swimming tournaments ==
=== Seniors' division ===
Team	Pts.
San Beda Red Lions	813.5
PCU Dolphins	551.0
St. Benilde Blazers	266.0
Mapua Cardinals	211.0
San Sebastian Stags	181.5

=== Juniors' division ===
Team	Pts.
LSGH Greenies	771.50
San Sebastian Staglets	641.00
UPHSD Altas	408.25
CSB Blazers	199.75
San Beda Red Cubs	93.00

== Chess tournaments ==
=== Seniors' division ===
Team	Pts.
PCU Dolphins	30.0
Mapua Cardinals	20.0
Letran Knights	15.0
San Sebastian Stags	10.0
CSB Blazers	5.0
San Beda Red Lions	3.0
JRU Heavy Bombers	2.0
UPHSD Altas	1.0

=== Juniors' division ===
Team	Pts.
PCU Baby Dolphins	30.0
San Sebastian Staglets	20.0
Letran Squires	15.0
LSGH Greenies	10,0
JRU Light Bombers	5.0
UPHSD Altalettes	3.0

=== Individual awards ===
- Most outstanding players:
  - Juniors': Haridas Pascua (PCU)
  - Seniors': Deniel Causo (PCU)
- Coach of the year: Raymond Salcedo (PCU)

== Cheerdance competition ==
The NCAA Cheerdance Competition was held on September 8, 2006 at the Araneta Coliseum. The UPHSD PerpSquad successfully defended their championship, while the Letran Cheering Squad and the Mapúa Cheerping Cardinals all improved their places as compared from last year.

Rank	Pep squad
1st	UPHSD PerpSquad
2nd	Letran Cheering Squad
3rd	Mapúa Cheerping Cardinals
4th	PCU Pep Squad
5th	JRU Marshalls
6th	San Sebastian Golden Stags Pep Squad
7th	San Beda Cheerleaders Association
DNP	St. Benilde Green Peppers

The Cheerdance Competition is not counted on the tabulation of the General Championship.

== General Championship ==
=== Seniors division ===
Rank	School	Points
1st	PCU	278
2nd	St. Benilde	198.5
3rd	Letran	148
4th	San Beda	147
5th	San Sebastian	145.5
6th	Mapúa	86
7th	UPHD	62.5
8th	JRU	13.5

== Broadcast notes ==
ABS-CBN Corporation subsidiaries Studio 23/S+A and The Filipino Channel broadcast the Playoffs series and selected elimination round games. The broadcast crew included Butch Maniego and Bill Velasco, among others. The broadcast crew included the courtside reporters from all schools.

== See also ==
- UAAP Season 69
