= JC Intal =

Filipino basketball player (born 1983)

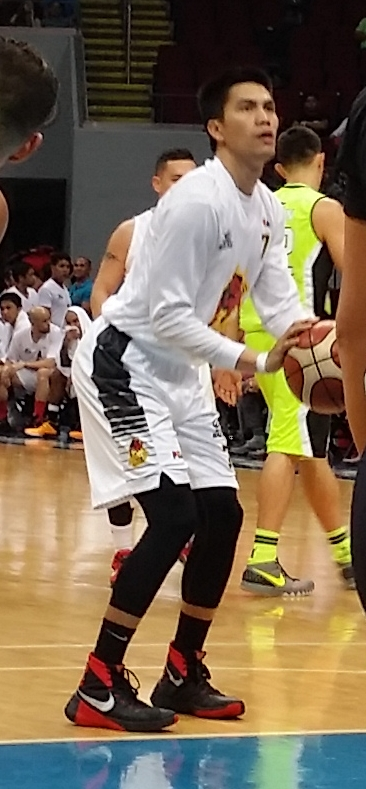
- Intal with the Barako Bull Energy in 2015

Personal information
- Born: November 18, 1983 (age 42) Minalin, Pampanga, Philippines
- Listed height: 6 ft 4 in (1.93 m)
- Listed weight: 185 lb (84 kg)

Career information
- High school: Claret School of Quezon City; Letran (Manila)
- College: Ateneo
- PBA draft: 2007: 1st round, 4th overall pick
- Drafted by: Air21 Express
- Playing career: 2007–2020
- Position: Small forward
- Number: 6, 7, 9

Career history
- 2007–2009: Air21 Express / Barako Bull Energy
- 2009–2012: Barangay Ginebra Kings
- 2012–2013: B-Meg Llamados / San Mig Coffee Mixers
- 2013–2016: Barako Bull Energy
- 2016–2020: Phoenix Super LPG Fuel Masters

Career highlights
- PBA champion (2012 Commissioner's); 3× PBA All-Star (2010–2012); UAAP champion (2002); UAAP Mythical First Team (2006); UAAP Most Improved Player (2004); UAAP Breakout Player of the Season (2006); PBL Slam Dunk Champion (2003)

John Christopher Antonio Intal (Tagalog pronunciation: [ʔɪnˈtal]; born November 18, 1983) is a Filipino former professional basketball player. He played for four teams during his career in the Philippine Basketball Association (PBA). He is married to television host and model Bianca Gonzalez.

== Early life and college career ==
Born in Minalin, Pampanga, Philippines, Intal initially studied at Claret School of Quezon City before he transferred to Letran he became a part of the Letran Squires high school varsity team. When he was in Grade 7, he made his first dunk. After his high school days, he tried out for the Ateneo Blue Eagles. While playing for the Blue Eagles, he was placed in the Team B and upon his second year in college he became a member of Team A. He was the part of the team that won its first UAAP Senior's Basketball Championship in 2002. He ended his college career in 2006 with a loss to the UST Growling Tigers in the UAAP Finals in that same year.

While in college, he played amateur basketball for the Harbour Centre Batang Pier of the Philippine Basketball League, where he became known for his high-flying abilities, thus earning the nickname The Rocket, having won the Slam Dunk contest in 2003.

== Professional career ==
=== Air 21/ Barako Bull Energy ===
Intal was drafted 4th overall by the Air21 Express in the 2007 PBA draft. He only played one conference in his rookie season, as he had a rare skin disease that prevented him from sweating, causing him to miss the next conferences while he sought treatment. After 6 months, he was able to play again.

=== Barangay Ginebra Kings ===
In 2009, he was acquired by Barangay Ginebra Kings via a trade. In three seasons with the Kings, he was a reliable role player, complementing with leading scorers Mark Caguioa, Jayjay Helterbrand and Eric Menk, and stepping up for them when they were injured. He was named Player of the Week for the week of February 1 to 7 after averaging 26.5 points, 10 rebounds, 3.5 assists and 2 blocks and for scoring a career-high 28 points in Ginebra's 113–100 quarterfinals win over the Talk ‘N Text Tropang Texters.

=== B-Meg Llamados/ San Mig Coffee Mixers ===
After three seasons with Ginebra, he was again traded to B-Meg (now San Mig Coffee) via a blockbuster three team trade in exchange for Kerby Raymundo and Dylan Ababou. While playing for San Mig, he suffered a meniscus tear in his left knee, causing him to miss basketball action for four months in 2012. Before he could return to full health, he came back into active play, but was never fully healthy, by which his left knee became swollen after every game. He was able to win one championship with the Coffee Mixers in the 2012 Commissioner's Cup.

=== Barako Bull Energy/Phoenix Super LPG Fuel Masters ===
Intal was traded again, this time to Barako Bull via a blockbuster 10-man, 5-team trade in January 2013.

He posted career highs in scoring, rebounds and assists in the 2014-15 season. That season, he competed in the Three-Point Shootout and the Slam Dunk Contest. He also won another Player of the Week award.

Before the start of the 2016 Governors' Cup, it was revealed that he had bone spurs in his ankles. He made his conference debut at Phoenix's last game of the conference.

In the 2017 Philippine Cup, he received another Player of the Week award.

In his last season, the 2020 Philippine Cup, the Fuel Masters made it all the way to the semifinals. After that season, he announced on his Instagram account that he had retired.

== PBA career statistics ==
Legend
GP	Games played	MPG	Minutes per game
FG%	Field-goal percentage	3P%	3-point field-goal percentage	FT%	Free-throw percentage
RPG	Rebounds per game	APG	Assists per game	SPG	Steals per game
BPG	Blocks per game	PPG	Points per game	**Bold**	Career high

=== Season-by-season averages ===
Year	Team	GP	MPG	FG%	3P%	FT%	RPG	APG	SPG	BPG	PPG
2007–08	Air21	32	11.9	.291	.164	.589	1.1	1.3	.3	.2	4.5
2008–09	Air21	41	15.0	.366	.236	.479	2.8	1.0	.5	.5	5.5
2008–09	Barangay Ginebra	41	15.0	.366	.236	.479	2.8	1.0	.5	.5	5.5
2009–10	Barangay Ginebra	40	21.4	**.420**	**.339**	.659	4.4	1.3	**.9**	**.6**	10.4
2010–11	Barangay Ginebra	44	16.2	.325	.298	.732	2.9	1.0	.5	**.6**	5.6
2011–12	Barangay Ginebra	**49**	19.7	.360	.221	.651	4.1	1.3	.4	.3	6.2
2011–12	B-Meg	**49**	19.7	.360	.221	.651	4.1	1.3	.4	.3	6.2
2012–13	San Mig Coffee	35	16.3	.272	.189	.696	2.7	1.3	.5	.2	3.8
2012–13	Barako Bull	35	16.3	.272	.189	.696	2.7	1.3	.5	.2	3.8
2013–14	Barako Bull	34	22.3	.378	.289	.698	4.5	1.2	.6	.5	9.1
2014–15	Barako Bull	36	**30.4**	.399	.294	.593	**5.7**	**1.9**	**.9**	.4	**12.8**
2015–16	Barako Bull	26	29.5	.361	.262	.675	5.1	1.7	.6	.5	11.8
2015–16	Phoenix	26	29.5	.361	.262	.675	5.1	1.7	.6	.5	11.8
2016–17	Phoenix	34	22.5	.371	.311	**.742**	3.6	1.7	.7	**.6**	10.1
2017–18	Phoenix	35	14.3	.323	.250	.583	2.8	1.0	.8	.4	4.0
2019	Phoenix Pulse	25	17.2	.346	.267	.688	4.5	1.4	.3	.4	5.0
2020	Phoenix Super LPG	16	14.3	.361	.297	.727	2.6	1.8	.4	.1	4.4
Career		447	19.3	.362	.272	.646	3.6	1.3	.6	.4	7.2

== International career ==
Intal was part of the 16-man Gilas Pilipinas 3.0 pool that was gearing up for the 2015 FIBA Asia Championship. After a successful stint in the 2015 Toyota Four Nations Cup and the 37th William Jones Cup in Taiwan, he was named to the Final 12 roster that represented the country in the FIBA Asia tournament.

== Personal life ==
Intal was engaged to TV host Bianca Gonzalez, his girlfriend since 2011. On March 20, 2014, he proposed to Gonzalez at Ninoy Aquino International Airport Terminal 2, as the latter was about to depart for London. Intal's parents and couple Cheska Garcia and Doug Kramer were among those who witnessed the proposal. Intal and Gonzalez married on December 4, 2014, in El Nido, Palawan. In April 2015, television host Boy Abunda announced on his program Aquino & Abunda Tonight that Gonzalez and Intal expecting their first child. Their first child, who they named Lucia Martine was born on October 23, 2015.

He has a younger brother, Rex, who plays volleyball for the national team and also played volleyball for Ateneo.

Since retiring, he has focused more on his career as an artist, specifically abstract painting. Since 2020, he has had 2 exhibits.
