= Macky Escalona =

Filipino basketball player

Personal information
- Born: September 27, 1984 (age 42) Quezon City, Philippines
- Listed height: 5 ft 11 in (1.80 m)
- Listed weight: 180 lb (82 kg)

Career information
- High school: Ateneo (Quezon City)
- College: Ateneo
- PBA draft: 2007: 1st round, 10th overall pick
- Drafted by: Barangay Ginebra Kings
- Playing career: 2007–2009
- Position: Point guard

Career history
- 2007–2009: Barangay Ginebra Kings

Career highlights
- PBA champions (2008 Fiesta); UAAP champions (2002); 2007 PBL Unity Cup Mythical Second Team

Mark Anthony Z. "Macky" Escalona (born September 27, 1984) is a Filipino former professional basketball player. He last played for the Barangay Ginebra Kings of the Philippine Basketball Association (PBA). He was drafted 10th overall by the Kings in the 2007 PBA draft.

== Player profile ==
Escalona played college basketball for the Ateneo Blue Eagles. He also played for Cebuana Lhuiller-Kwarta Padala Moneymen in the Philippine Basketball League before moving to the Barangay Ginebra Kings in the Philippine Basketball Association.

== Appearances in media ==
Escalona was one of the finalists in the Myx VJ Search 2008, but failed to win.
