= Ken Bono =

Filipino basketball player

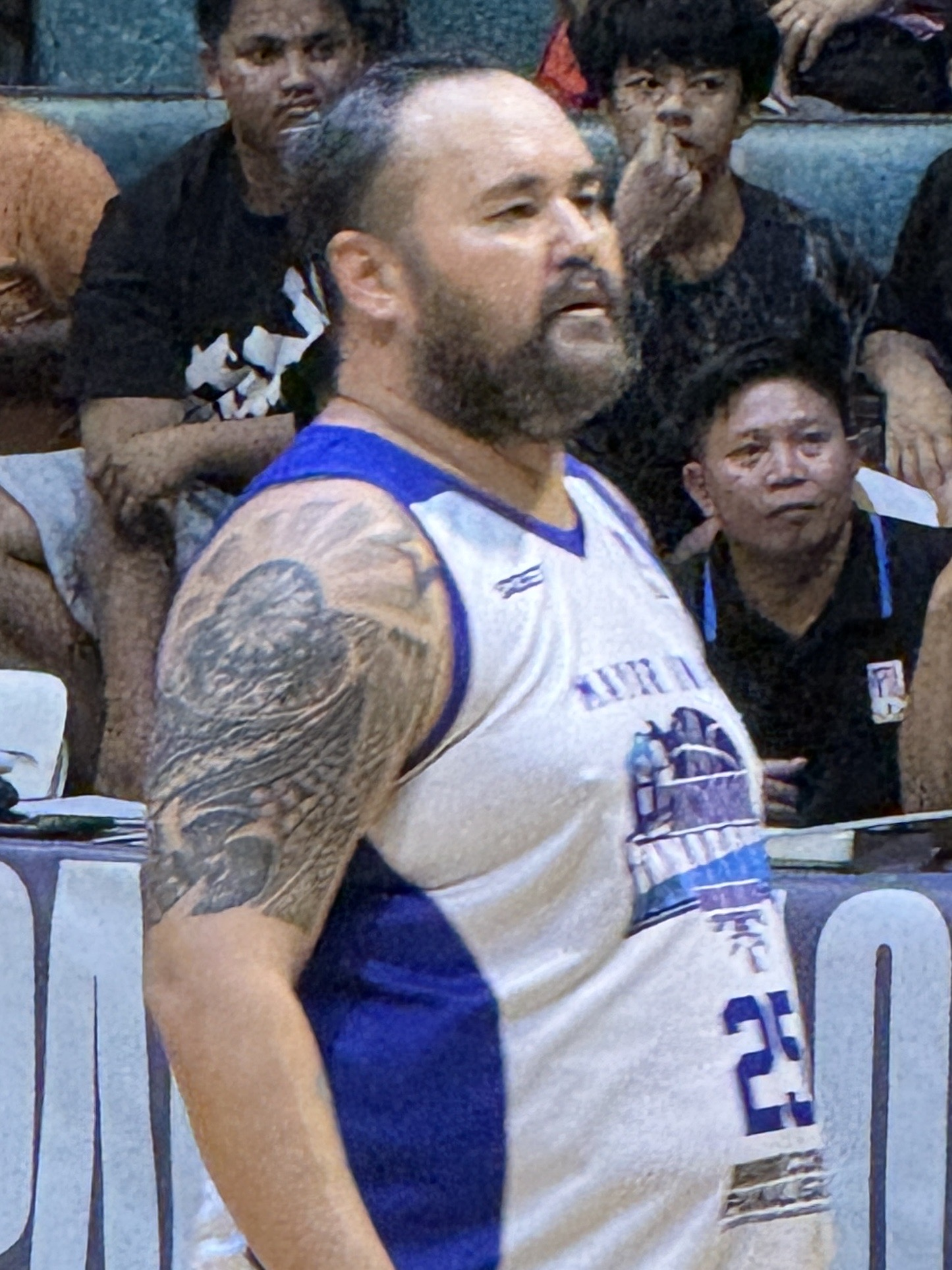
- Bono with the Mindoro Tamaraws in 2025

No. 25 – Mindoro Tamaraws
- Position: Power forward / center
- League: MPBL

Personal information
- Born: June 19, 1984 (age 42) Iloilo City, Philippines
- Listed height: 6 ft 5 in (1.96 m)
- Listed weight: 280 lb (127 kg)

Career information
- High school: Iloilo Central Commercial High School (Iloilo City)
- College: Adamson
- PBA draft: 2007: 1st round, 6th overall pick
- Drafted by: Alaska Aces
- Playing career: 2007–present

Career history
- 2007–2008: Alaska Aces
- 2008–2009: San Miguel Beermen
- 2009–2010: Coca Cola Tigers
- 2010–2011: Barako Bull Energy Boosters
- 2012: Bangkok Cobras
- 2012–2013: B-Meg Llamados / San Mig Coffee Mixers
- 2013–2018: Meralco Bolts
- 2019: TNT KaTropa
- 2022–2024: San Miguel Beermen 3x3
- 2024–present: Mindoro Tamaraws

Career highlights
- 2× PBA champion (2009 Fiesta, 2013 Governors'); UAAP Most Valuable Player (2006); UAAP Mythical First Team (2006)

Karl Kenneth Odani Bono (born June 19, 1984) is a Filipino professional basketball player who plays for the Mindoro Tamaraws of the Maharlika Pilipinas Basketball League (MPBL). He played collegiate basketball for the Adamson Soaring Falcons in the University Athletic Association of the Philippines (UAAP) from 2003 to 2006 and was named the league's Most Valuable Player in his final season before being selected sixth overall by the Alaska Aces in the 2007 PBA draft.

In the Philippine Basketball League (PBL), Bono played for Montaña Pawnshop and Cebuana Lhuillier. In his last conference in the PBL, he was the MVP frontrunner but lost the award to Jayson Castro of Harbour Centre due to lack of media votes. He also played for the Bangkok Cobras in the ASEAN Basketball League.

== Achievements ==
=== University Athletic Association of the Philippines (UAAP) ===
- 2006 Most Valuable Player
- 2006 Mythical First Team

=== Philippine Basketball League (PBL) ===
- 2006 Most Improved Player
- 2006 Mythical Second Team
- 2007 Sportsmanship Award
- 2007 Mythical First Team

=== Philippine Basketball Association (PBA) ===
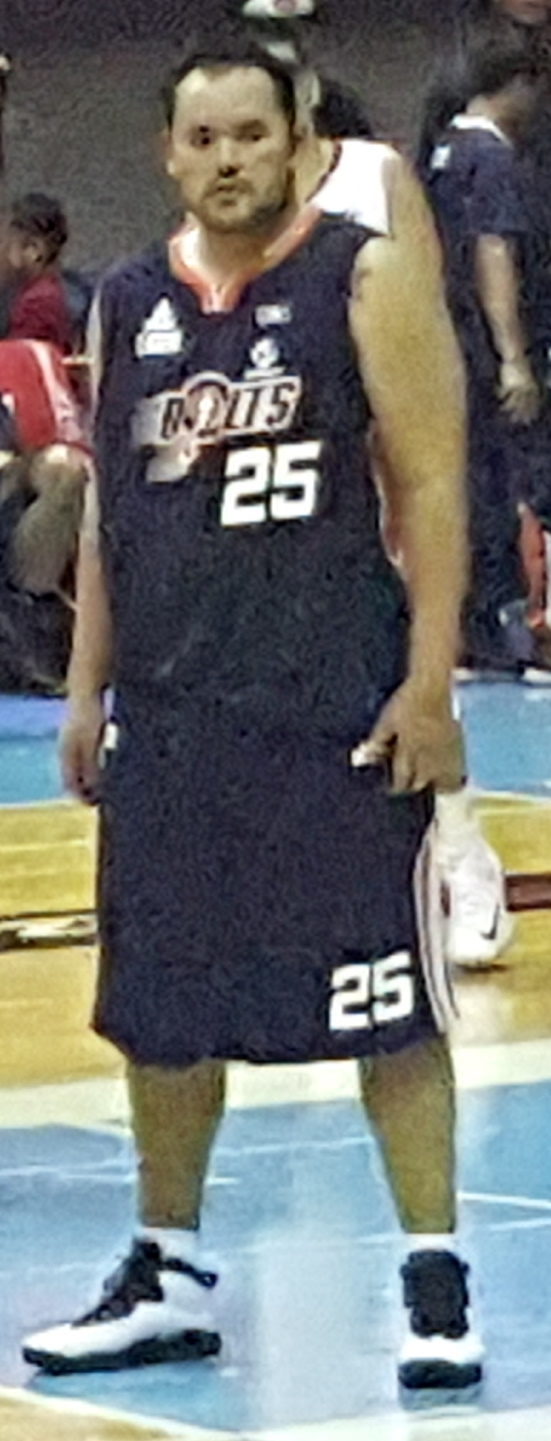
Bono with the Meralco Bolts in 2016.

- 2009 PBA Fiesta Conference champion (with San Miguel Beermen)
- 2013 PBA Governors' Cup champion (with San Mig Coffee Mixers)

=== Philippine Sportswriters Association ===
- 2006 Amateur Player of the Year

== PBA career statistics ==
Legend
GP	Games played	MPG	Minutes per game
FG%	Field-goal percentage	3P%	3-point field-goal percentage	FT%	Free-throw percentage
RPG	Rebounds per game	APG	Assists per game	SPG	Steals per game
BPG	Blocks per game	PPG	Points per game	**Bold**	Career high

Correct as of October 19, 2016

=== Season-by-season averages ===
Year	Team	GP	MPG	FG%	3P%	FT%	RPG	APG	SPG	BPG	PPG
2007–08	Alaska / Magnolia	**29**	8.5	**.466**	.538	.727	2.3	.4	.0	.1	3.8
2008–09	San Miguel	24	8.2	.402	.250	.667	2.2	.2	.1	**.2**	3.5
2009–10	Coca-Cola	24	8.7	.338	.100	.800	2.4	.4	.1	.0	2.8
2010–11	Barako Bull	8	**14.5**	.370	**1.000**	.750	**3.8**	**.5**	**.3**	.1	**5.5**
2011–12	B-Meg	3	1.7	.000	.000	.000	1.2	.2	.0	.0	3.0
2015–16	Meralco	18	6.5	.342	.000	**1.000**	1.1	.5	.0	.0	1.8
Career		106	8.4	.391	.311	.758	2.2	.4	.1	.1	3.2

== Personal life ==
Bono is the son of an American ex-marine Anthony Shannon and Maria Nonie Bono of Iloilo City. He is married and a father of one.
