= Jervy Cruz =

Filipino basketball player

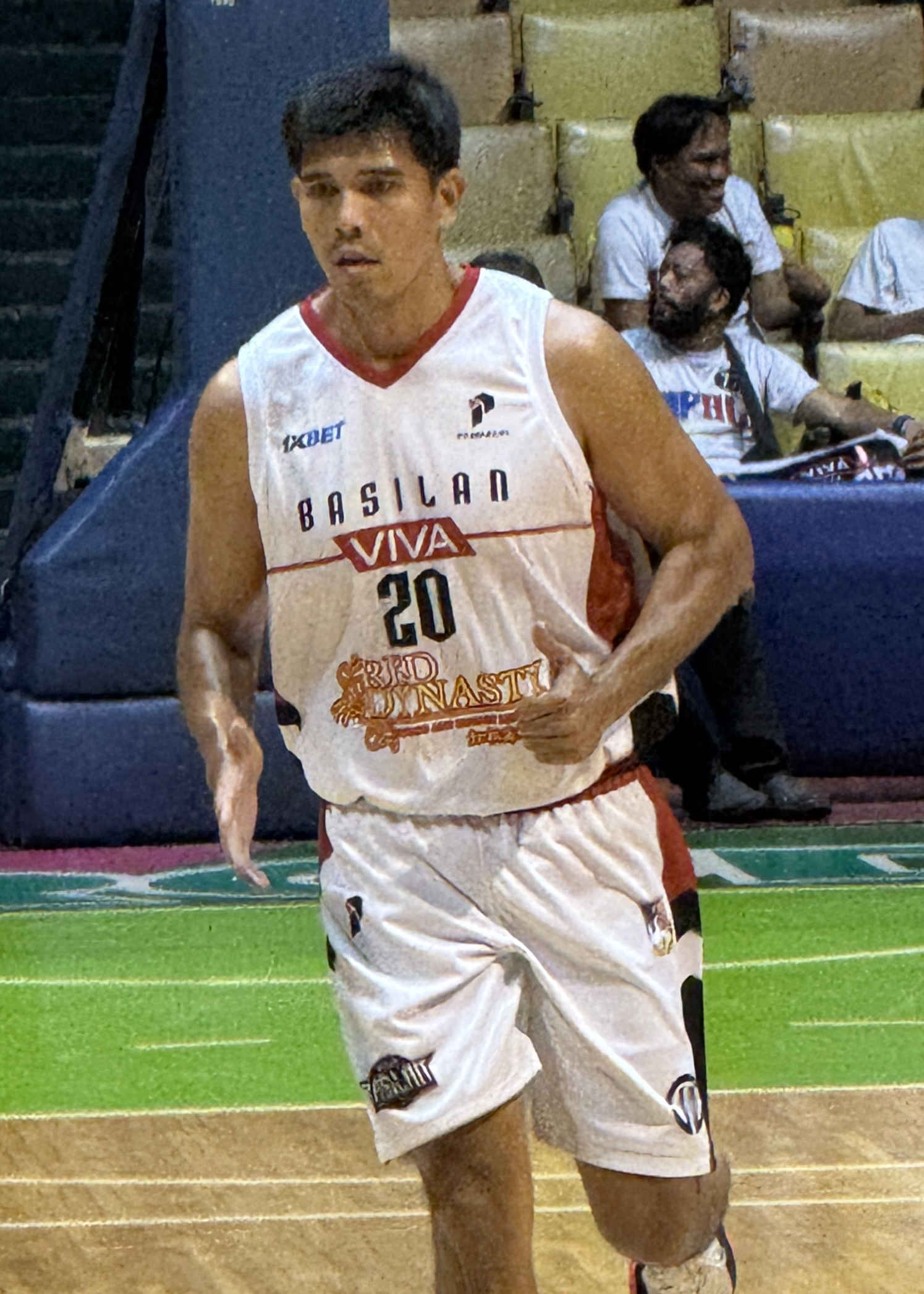
- Cruz with the Basilan Viva Portmasters in 2025

Member of the Nampicuan Municipal Council
- Incumbent
- Assumed office June 30, 2025

Personal details
- Born: September 9, 1986 (age 40) Quezon City, Philippines
- Party: Akay National Political Party
- Basketball career

No. 20 – Basilan Steel
- Position: Power forward
- League: MPBL

Personal information
- Listed height: 6 ft 4 in (1.93 m)
- Listed weight: 220 lb (100 kg)

Career information
- High school: Our Lady of Sacred Heart Academy (Guimba, Nueva Ecija)
- College: UST
- PBA draft: 2009: 1st round, 4th overall pick
- Drafted by: Rain or Shine Elasto Painters
- Playing career: 2009–present

Career history
- 2009–2015: Rain or Shine Elasto Painters
- 2015: Barako Bull Energy
- 2015–2019: Barangay Ginebra San Miguel
- 2019–2022: NorthPort Batang Pier
- 2023: Davao Occidental Tigers
- 2023–2025: GenSan / South Cotabato Warriors
- 2025-present: Basilan Viva Portmasters / Basilan Steel

Career highlights
- 4× PBA champion (2012 Governors', 2016 Governors', 2017 Governors', 2018 Commissioner's); PBA All-Rookie Team (2010); PBA Mr. Quality Minutes (2013); UAAP champion (2006); UAAP Most Valuable Player (2007); 3× UAAP Mythical First Team (2006–2008); UAAP Defensive Player of the Year (2006); PBL Mythical First Team (2008–09 Season); PBL Mythical Second Team (2007–08 Season)

Jervy Alaba Cruz (born September 9, 1986) is a Filipino professional basketball player and politician currently playing for the Basilan Steel of the Maharlika Pilipinas Basketball League (MPBL).

== Basketball career ==
=== College career ===
Cruz played college basketball for the University of Santo Tomas (UST) Growling Tigers of the University Athletic Association of the Philippines (UAAP). In a decorated college career, Cruz was awarded the UAAP Most Valuable Player in UAAP Season 70, and played a key role in the Growling Tigers' upset championship victory over the heavily favored Ateneo de Manila University (ADMU) Blue Eagles in UAAP Season 69.

=== Professional career ===
After his stellar college career, Cruz was picked fifth overall in the 2009 PBA draft by the Rain or Shine Elasto Painters. Cruz was the third youngest player in the 2009–10 PBA season at only 23 years of age. He played 45 games and he averaged 6.4 points per game, 0.2 blocks per game, and 4.4 rebounds per game.

After six seasons for Rain or Shine, he was sent initially to the GlobalPort Batang Pier for Jewel Ponferada but never played for them as he was traded after more than a month to Barako for Rico Maierhofer.

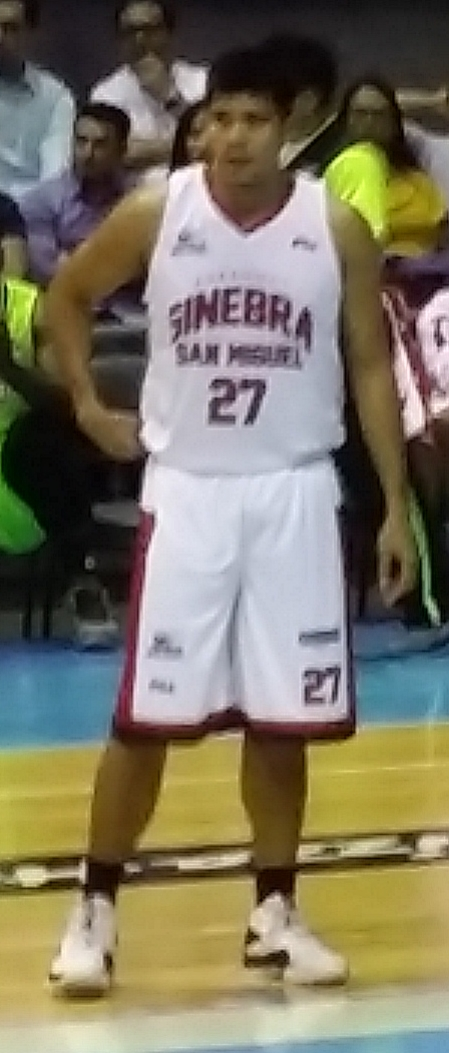
Cruz with the Barangay Ginebra San Miguel in 2015.

Cruz was traded again by Barako Bull to Barangay Ginebra for Rodney Brondial and a 2018 second-round pick after only four games into the 2015–16 season.

== Political career ==
Cruz ran won as councilor of his hometown of Nampicuan, Nueva Ecija in 2025. Cruz was instrumental in bringing the Larga Pilipinas bicycle race in Nampicuan later that year.

== PBA career statistics ==
Legend
GP	Games played	MPG	Minutes per game
FG%	Field-goal percentage	3P%	3-point field-goal percentage	FT%	Free-throw percentage
RPG	Rebounds per game	APG	Assists per game	SPG	Steals per game
BPG	Blocks per game	PPG	Points per game	**Bold**	Career high

As of the end of 2021 season

=== Season-by-season ===
Year	Team	GP	MPG	FG%	3P%	FT%	RPG	APG	SPG	BPG	PPG
2009–10	Rain or Shine	45	15.8	.436	.000	.658	4.4	.2	.1	.2	6.0
2010–11	Rain or Shine	34	13.8	.369	—	.558	4.8	.4	.3	.1	4.1
2011–12	Rain or Shine	51	14.9	**.506**	.000	.729	4.4	.6	.2	.2	6.7
2012–13	Rain or Shine	57	**21.2**	.482	—	.730	**6.3**	**.8**	**.4**	**.4**	**8.8**
2013–14	Rain or Shine	**58**	17.5	.473	—	.653	4.8	**.8**	.2	.2	6.3
2014–15	Rain or Shine	44	13.4	.470	.000	.674	3.4	.6	.2	.1	4.7
2015–16	Barako Bull	42	10.1	.433	.000	.683	2.7	.4	.2	.0	3.3
2015–16	Barangay Ginebra	42	10.1	.433	.000	.683	2.7	.4	.2	.0	3.3
2016–17	Barangay Ginebra	42	11.2	.407	—	.794	2.7	.6	.2	.1	4.6
2017–18	Barangay Ginebra	32	14.0	.424	.250	.750	3.6	**.8**	.1	.1	5.2
2019	Barangay Ginebra	31	10.6	.402	**.304**	**.889**	2.8	.5	.1	.1	3.9
2019	NorthPort	31	10.6	.402	**.304**	**.889**	2.8	.5	.1	.1	3.9
2020	NorthPort	11	16.9	.379	.294	.684	5.5	**.8**	**.4**	.0	6.2
2021	NorthPort	2	6.7	.400	.000	.500	1.5	.5	.0	.0	2.5
Career		449	14.8	.449	.255	.705	4.2	.6	.2	.1	5.6
