= UAAP Season 69 =

Multi-sport event

- "Achieving Excellence in Sports Through Unity, Harmony and Commitment"
- Host school: University of the East

Overall
- Seniors: University of Santo Tomas
- Juniors: University of Santo Tomas

Seniors' champions
Sport		Men	Women
Basketball		UST	UST
Volleyball		FEU	UST
Chess		FEU	UST
Table tennis		FEU	UST
Taekwondo		UST	UST
Judo		UST	UP
Swimming		UP	UST
Beach volleyball		FEU (DS)	Adamson (DS)
Track and field		FEU	FEU
Football		UST	FEU
Fencing		UE	Ateneo
Tennis		UST	UST
Badminton		FEU	FEU
Baseball		UST	N/A
Softball		N/A	Adamson
- Cheerdance: UST (EX) (Ex - Coed)

Juniors' champions
Sport		Boys	Girls
Basketball		Ateneo	N/A
Volleyball		UE	UE
Chess		UE	
Table tennis		UST	
Taekwondo		UST	
Judo		Ateneo	
Swimming		Ateneo	UP
Track and field		UST	
- (NT) = No tournament; (DS) = Demonstration Sport; (Ex) = Exhibition;

UAAP Season 69 was the 2006–07 season of the University Athletic Association of the Philippines (UAAP). The University of the East was the season host with the theme “Achieving Excellence in Sports Through Unity, Harmony and Commitment.” The season started with basketball competition on July 8, 2006 at the Araneta Coliseum.

== Basketball ==
=== Men's tournament ===
==== Elimination round ====
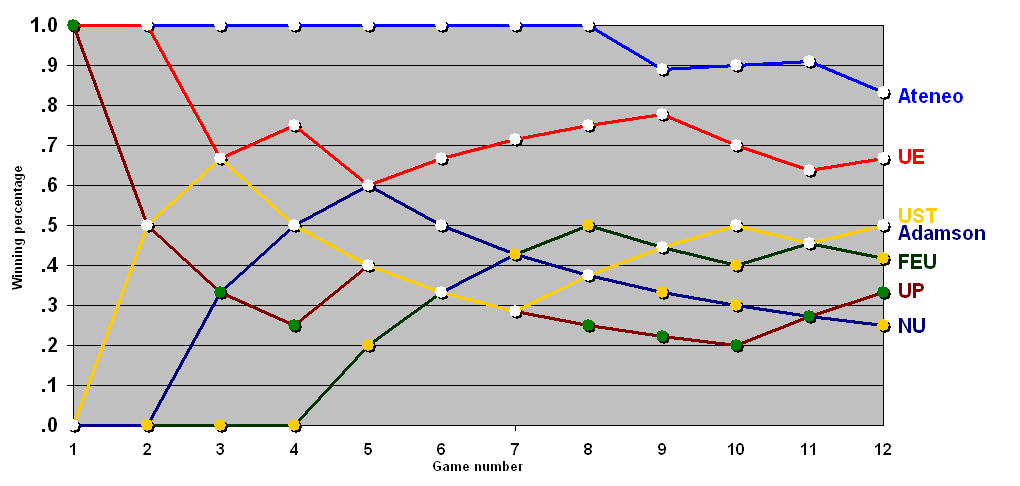
Team standings progression in the men's basketball tournament.

Pos	Team	W	L	PCT	GB	Qualification
1	Ateneo Blue Eagles	10	2	.833	—	Twice-to-beat in the semifinals
2	UE Red Warriors (H)	8	4	.667	2	Twice-to-beat in the semifinals
3	UST Growling Tigers	6	6	.500 (Note: Third-seed playoff: UST 85–71 Adamson)	4	Twice-to-win in the semifinals
4	Adamson Soaring Falcons	6	6	.500	4	Twice-to-win in the semifinals
5	FEU Tamaraws	5	7	.417	5	
6	UP Fighting Maroons	4	8	.333	6	
7	NU Bulldogs	3	9	.250	7	

Source: ABS-CBN Sports
Rules for classification: 1) winning percentage; 2) if tied for top 4 seeds, one-game playoff; 3) head-to-head record; 4) head-to-head point differential; 5) overall point differential
(H) Hosts
Notes:

Tiebreaker: UST defeats Adamson on the playoff for the 3rd seed, 85-71. De La Salle University did not participate in the basketball tournament this season.

==== Playoffs ====
Semifinals (Top 2 twice-to-beat)
1	Ateneo	76
4	Adamson	73
2	UE	75	81
3	UST	79	82

Finals (Best-of-three playoff)
1	Ateneo	73	71	74
3	UST	72	87	76*

*Overtime

==== Awardees ====
- Most Valuable Player: Ken Bono (Adamson Soaring Falcons)
- Rookie of the Year: Woody Co (UP Fighting Maroons)

=== Women's tournament ===
==== Elimination round ====
Pos	Team	W	L	PCT	GB	Qualification
1	UST Growling Tigresses	9	3	.750 (Note: Head-to-head point differential: UST +35, FEU –13, Ateneo –22; second-seed playoff: FEU 49–48 Ateneo)	—	Twice-to-beat in the semifinals
2	FEU Lady Tamaraws	9	3	.750	—	Twice-to-beat in the semifinals
3	Ateneo Lady Eagles	9	3	.750	—	Twice-to-win in the semifinals
4	UP Lady Maroons	7	5	.583	2	Twice-to-win in the semifinals
5	Adamson Lady Falcons	6	6	.500	3	
6	UE Lady Warriors (H)	2	10	.167	7	
7	NU Lady Bulldogs	0	12	.000	9	

Source: ABS-CBN Sports
Rules for classification: 1) winning percentage; 2) if tied for top 4 seeds, one-game playoff; 3) head-to-head record; 4) head-to-head point differential; 5) overall point differential
(H) Hosts
Notes:

Tiebreakers:

- UST clinched the #1 seed and the twice to beat advantage at the semifinals with a better points difference (+35) against FEU (–13) and Ateneo (–22)
- FEU defeated Ateneo on the playoff for the 2nd seed, 49–48.

==== Playoffs ====
With UST, FEU and Ateneo tied on the first spot, the points difference system was used - UST emerged with the highest quotient, so FEU and Ateneo figured in a classification game to determine which team gets the twice to beat advantage in the semifinals. FEU won the game, 49–48.

Semifinals (Top 2 twice-to-beat)
1	UST	64	78
4	UP	72	68
2	FEU	53	46
3	Ateneo	63	44

Finals (Best-of-three playoff)
1	UST	52	67	67
2	FEU	49	75	59

==== Awardees ====
- Most Valuable Player: Cassy Tioseco (Ateneo Lady Eagles)
- Rookie of the Year: Katherine Sandel (Adamson Lady Falcons)

=== Juniors' tournament ===
==== Elimination round ====
Pos	Team	W	L	PCT	GB	Qualification
1	Ateneo Blue Eaglets	12	0	1.000	—	Advance to the Finals (Note: As Ateneo won all of their elimination round games, the stepladder format will be used instead of the regular Final Four format.)
2	FEU–D Baby Tamaraws	10	2	.833	2	Twice-to-beat in stepladder round 2
3	UPIS Junior Fighting Maroons	7	5	.583	5	Proceed to stepladder round 1
4	Adamson Baby Falcons	6	6	.500	6	Proceed to stepladder round 1
5	UST Tiger Cubs	4	8	.333	8	
6	UE Junior Red Warriors (H)	2	10	.167	10	
7	NUNS Bullpups	1	11	.083	11	

Source: ABS-CBN Sports
Rules for classification: 1) winning percentage; 2) if tied for a top 4 seed, one-game playoff; 3) head-to-head record; 4) head-to-head point differential; 5) overall point differential
(H) Hosts

==== Playoffs ====
With Ateneo's 12–0 sweep of the elimination round, the step ladder format will be used. After finishing 3rd and 4th in the elimination round, Adamson and UPIS will face for the right to face FEU-FERN in the next round in a twice-to-win disadvantage. Whoever wins in the semifinals between the winner of the knockout game and FEU-FERN will emerge into the Finals with Ateneo in a best of three series.

This would be the FEU-FERN Baby Tamaraws' first Finals appearance.

Stepladder round 1 (Single-elimination)
3	UP	78
4	Adamson	84

Stepladder round 2 (No. 2 twice-to-beat)
2	FEU–FERN	76
4	Adamson	66

Finals (Best-of-three playoff)
1	Ateneo	55	73	69
2	FEU–FERN	67	65	61

==== Awardees ====
- Most Valuable Player: Bacon Austria (Ateneo Blue Eaglets)
- Rookie of the Year: Jeff Olalia (Adamson Baby Falcons)

== Volleyball ==
Four championships are disputed; men's, women's, boys' and girls'.

=== Men's tournament ===
==== Elimination round ====
Pos	Team	Pld	W	L	Pts	SW	SL	SR	Qualification
1	FEU Tamaraws	12	11 (Note: First–seed playoff: FEU 3–2 UP)	1	33	34	8	4.250	Twice-to-beat in the semifinals
2	UP Fighting Maroons (H)	12	11	1	33	34	8	4.250	Twice-to-beat in the semifinals
3	UST Growling Tigers	12	8	4	24	27	17	1.588	Twice-to-win in the semifinals
4	NU Bulldogs	12	5	7	15	20	26	0.769	Twice-to-win in the semifinals
5	Ateneo Blue Eagles	12	3	9	9	19	27	0.704	
6	Adamson Soaring Falcons	12	2	10	6	14	32	0.438	
7	UE Red Warriors	12	2	10	6	9	35	0.257	
8	De La Salle Green Archers	0	0	0	0	0	0	—	Suspended

Source: ABS-CBN Sports
Rules for classification: 1) number of wins; 2) if tied for top 4 seeds, or for #4 seed, one-game playoff; 3) match points; 4) sets ratio; 5) points ratio; 6) head-to-head record
(H) Host

==== Playoffs ====
1st–seed playoff
FEU	3
UP	2

Semifinals; Top seeds twice-to-beat
1	FEU	3
4	NU	0
2	UP	1	3
3	UST	3	1

Finals; Best-of-three series
1	FEU	3	3
2	UP	1	1

==== Awards ====
- Most valuable player: Edjet Mabbayad (FEU Tamaraws)
- Rookie of the Year: Marlon Macabulos (UST Growling Tigers)

=== Women's tournament ===
==== Elimination round ====
Pos	Team	Pld	W	L	Pts	SW	SL	SR	Qualification
1	FEU Lady Tamaraws	12	11 (Note: First–seed playoff: UST 2–3 FEU)	1	33	34	6	5.667	Twice-to-beat in the semifinals
2	UST Growling Tigresses	12	11	1	33	32	4	8.000	Twice-to-beat in the semifinals
3	Adamson Lady Falcons	12	8	4	24	29	15	1.933	Twice-to-win in the semifinals
4	UE Amazons	12	5	7	15	17	20	0.850	Twice-to-win in the semifinals
5	Ateneo Lady Eagles	12	4	8	12	20	23	0.870	
6	UP Lady Maroons (H)	12	3	9	9	12	28	0.429	
7	NU Lady Bulldogs	12	0	12	0	0	36	0.000	
8	De La Salle Lady Archers	0	0	0	0	0	0	—	Suspended

Source: ABS-CBN Sports
(H) Host

==== Playoffs ====
1st–seed playoff
UST	2
FEU	3

Semifinals; Top seeds twice-to-beat
1	FEU	3
4	UE	0
2	UST	1	3
3	Adamson	3	0

Finals; Best-of-three series
1	FEU	1	0
2	UST	3	3

==== Awards ====
- Most valuable player: Venus Bernal (UST Growling Tigresses)
- Rookie of the Year: Mecaila Morada (FEU Lady Tamaraws)

== Football ==
=== Men's division ===
==== Elimination round ====
Pos	Team	Pld	W	D	L	GF	GA	GD	Pts	Qualification
1	UST Growling Tigers	8	5	2	1	14	5	+9	17	Finals
2	FEU Tamaraws	8	4	1	3	12	8	+4	13	Finals
3	UP Fighting Maroons	8	3	2	3	13	11	+2	11	
4	Ateneo Blue Eagles	8	2	3	3	4	6	−2	9	
5	UE Red Warriors (H)	8	1	2	5	6	10	−4	5	
6	De La Salle Green Archers	0	0	0	0	0	0	0	0	Suspended

Source: ABS-CBN Sports
(H) Hosts

==== Final ====
18 February 2007

UST Growling Tigers	2–2 (a.e.t.)	FEU Tamaraws
Guillermo 55'; Pelayo 77'	Report	Sobremisana 50' (pen.); Cordova 90'
Penalties
Becite (penalty scored); Madrona (penalty scored); Pelayo (penalty scored); Esteban (penalty scored)	4–2	(penalty scored) Sobremisana; (penalty missed) Gustillo; (penalty scored) Macaspac; (penalty missed) Simpron

Erenchun Field, Ateneo de Manila University, Quezon City

== Softball ==
The UAAP Season 69 softball tournament fields five teams with the Adamson Lady Falcons as the defending champions. Games are held in University of Santo Tomas (UST) Open Field.

=== Team standings ===
Pos	Team	Pld	W	L	PCT	Qualification
1	Adamson Lady Falcons	8	7	1	.875	Twice-to-beat in the semifinals
2	UP Lady Maroons	8	6	2	.750	Twice-to-beat in the semifinals
3	UST Growling Tigresses	8	5	3	.625	Twice-to-win in the semifinals
4	UE Amazons (H)	8	2	6	.250	Twice-to-win in the semifinals
5	Ateneo Lady Eagles	8	0	8	.000	
6	De La Salle Lady Archers	0	0	0	—	Suspended

Source: ABS-CBN Sports
(H) Hosts

=== Match-up results ===
January 6, 2007 09:00
Team	1	2	3	4	5	6	7	R	H	E
Ateneo Lady Eagles	3	0	0	0	0	X	X	3	2	1
UP Lady Maroons	4	7	9	2	X	X	X	22	7	8
WP: Dione Macasu (1–0) LP: Kristine Drilon (0–1); Home runs: Ateneo: UP: Jocelyn Gonzales (1st); Notes: Game ended by run ahead rule

January 6, 2007 12:00
Team	1	2	3	4	5	6	7	R	H	E
UST Growling Tigresses	4	–	–	–	–	–	–	4	—	—
UE Lady Warriors	0	–	–	–	–	–	–	0	—	—

January 10, 2007 09:00
Team	1	2	3	4	5	6	7	R	H	E
UST Growling Tigresses	0	0	0	0	0	0	0	0	6	4
UP Lady Maroons	0	1	0	0	1	0	X	2	3	1
WP: Dione Macasu (2–0) LP: Home runs: UST: None; UP: Zenny Badajos (2nd)

=== Playoffs ===
Semifinals #1 and #2 have twice-to-beat advantage
February 14
1 Adamson	8
4 UE	0
February 14 & 16
2 UP	1	3
3 UST	2	1

Finals; Best-of-three series
1 Adamson	2
2 UP	1

== Fencing ==
Two championships are disputed; men's and women's. The following results are final. Host team in boldface.

=== Men's tournament ===
Team	Medals			
Team	Gold	Silver	Bronze	Total
**UE Red Warriors**	2	2	2	**6**
UST Growling Tigers	2	1	2	**5**
Ateneo Blue Eagles	2	1	1	**4**
UP Fighting Maroons	0	2	3	**5**
FEU Tamaraws	0	0	1	**1**
De La Salle Green Archers	Suspended			

==== Awardees ====
- Most Valuable Player: Bonifacio Jacinto (UE)
- Rookie of the Year: Harris Orendain (UST)

=== Women's tournament ===
Team	Medals			
Team	Gold	Silver	Bronze	Total
Ateneo Lady Eagles	2	1	3	**6**
UP Lady Maroons	2	1	2	**5**
**UE Amazons**	2	1	1	**4**
UST Tigresses	0	3	3	**6**
FEU Tamaraws	0	0	0	**0**
De La Salle Lady Archers	Suspended			

==== Awardees ====
- Most Valuable Player: Victoria Garcia (ADMU)
- Rookie of the Year: Lafayette Garcia (ADMU)

== Chess ==
Three titles were disputed for the UAAP Chess Championship. Host team in boldface. The results below are final.

=== Men's tournament ===
Team	Points
FEU Tamaraws	33.5
UP Fighting Maroons	31.5
Adamson Soaring Falcons	31.5
**UE Red Warriors**	24.5
UST Growling Tigers	21.5
NU Bulldogs	12.0
Ateneo Blue Eagles	7.0
De La Salle Green Archers	Suspended

=== Women's tournament ===
Team	Points
UST Tigresses	31.0
FEU Lady Tamaraws	21.5
UP Lady Maroons	21.0
Ateneo Lady Eagles	13.5
**UE Amazons**	8.0
NU Lady Bulldogs	9.5
De La Salle Lady Archers	Suspended

=== Juniors' tournament ===
Team	Points
**UE Pages**	33.5
Adamson Baby Falcons	31.0
Ateneo Blue Eaglets	22.5
UST Tiger Cubs	21.0
NU Bullpups	10.0
FEU-FERN Baby Tamaraws	2.0
De La Salle Junior Archers	Suspended

== Taekwondo ==
Three titles were disputed for the UAAP Taekwondo Championship.

Rank	Men's	Women's	Juniors
Champion	UST Growling Tigers	UST Tigresses	UST Tiger Cubs
2nd	**UE Red Warriors**	UP Lady Maroons	Ateneo Blue Eaglets
3rd	FEU Tamaraws	FEU Lady Tamaraws	UPIS Junior Maroons
4th	Ateneo Blue Eagles	Ateneo Lady Eagles	**UE Pages**
5th	UP Fighting Maroons	**UE Amazons**	FEU-FERN Baby Tamaraws
6th	De La Salle Green Archers		

== Judo ==
=== Men's tournament ===
Team	Points
UST Growling Tigers	40
UP Fighting Maroons	39
Ateneo Blue Eagles	35
**UE Red Warriors**	
Adamson Falcons	
De La Salle Green Archers	Suspended

==== Awardees ====
- Most Valuable Player: Stephen Gerena (UST)
- Rookie of the Year: Salvador S. Reyes, Jr. (Ateneo)

=== Women's tournament ===
Team	Points
UP Lady Maroons	76
UST Tigresses	21
Ateneo Lady Eagles	10
**UE Amazons**	
Adamson Lady Falcons	
De La Salle Lady Archers	Suspended

==== Awardees ====
- Most Valuable Player: Mellisa Buyco (UP)
- Rookie of the Year: Leslyn Gonzales (UP)

=== Juniors' tournament ===
Juniors' judo was played as a demonstration sport.

Team	Points
Ateneo Blue Eaglets	52
**UE Pages**	2
Adamson Baby Falcons	
UST Tiger Cubs	

== Swimming ==
The UAAP Season 69 Swimming Championships were held from September 21 to September 24, 2006 at the Rizal Memorial Swimming Center at Vito Cruz St., Malate, Manila. Four titles were disputed in the four-division tournament.

Team ranking is determined by a point system, similar to that of the overall championship. The points given are based on the swimmer's/team's finish in the finals of an event, which include only the top eight finishers from the preliminaries. The gold medalist(s) receive 15 points, silver gets 12, bronze has 10. The following points: 8, 6, 4, 2 and 1 are given to the rest of the participating swimmers/teams according to their order of finish.

=== Men's tournament ===
Team	Medals				Points
Team	Gold	Silver	Bronze	Total	Points
UP Fighting Maroons	16	8	7	31	**311.5**
UST Tiger Sharks					**269**
Ateneo Blue Eagles					**140.5**
**UE Red Warriors**	0	0	0	0	**5**
De La Salle Green Archers	Suspended				

Host team in boldface - Data incomplete

==== Awardees ====
- Most Valuable Player: Louie Francis Marquez (UST)
- Rookie of the Year: Ryan Paolo Arabejo (UP)
- UP repeated a four-peat they last did during the 1996-2000 seasons.

=== Women's tournament ===
Team	Medals				Points
Team	Gold	Silver	Bronze	Total	Points
UST Tigresses					**260**
UP Lady Maroons	11	2	3	15	**223**
Ateneo Lady Eagles					**195**
**UE Amazons**	0	0	0	0	**33**
De La Salle Lady Archers	Suspended				

Host team in boldface - Data incomplete

==== Awardees ====
- Most Valuable Player: Luica Gaudes Dacanay (UP)
- Rookie of the Year: Heidi Gem Ong (ADMU)
- UPIS took home their first ever crown.

=== Boys' tournament ===
Team	Medals				Points
Team	Gold	Silver	Bronze	Total	Points
Ateneo Blue Eaglets	4				
UST Tiger Cubs	0				
UPIS Junior Maroons	0				
UE Pages	0				
De La Salle Junior Archers	Suspended				

Host team in boldface - Data incomplete

==== Awardees ====
- Most Valuable Player:
- Rookie of the Year:

=== Girls' tournament ===
Team	Medals				Points
Team	Gold	Silver	Bronze	Total	Points
UPIS Lady Junior Maroons					
UST Tigress Cubs	0				
UE Pages	0				
De La Salle Junior Lady Archers	Suspended				

Host team in boldface - Data incomplete

==== Awardees ====
- Most Valuable Player:
- Rookie of the Year:

== Track and field (Athletics) ==
Three titles were disputed for the UAAP Track and Field.

Rank	Men's	Women's	Juniors
Champion	FEU Tamaraws	FEU Lady Tamaraws	UST Tiger Cubs
2nd	UST Growling Tigers	UST Tigresses	Ateneo Blue Eaglets
3rd	Ateneo Blue Eagles	**UE Amazons**	UPIS Junior Maroons
4th	Adamson Soaring Falcons	UP Lady Maroons	**UE Pages**
5th	**UE Red Warriors**	Adamson Lady Falcons	FEU-FERN Baby Tamaraws
6th	UP Fighting Maroons	Ateneo Lady Eagles	De La Salle Green Archers
7th	De La Salle Green Archers Suspended		-

== Cheerdance competition ==
The Cheerdance Competition was held on September 10, 2006 at the Araneta Coliseum. Cheer dance competition is an exhibition event. Points for the general championship are not awarded to the participants

The UST Salinggawi Dance Troupe clinched their eight UAAP cheerdance title via 5 consecutive wins, with FEU improving to second place, and UP falling to third place.

Rank	Pep squad	Score
1st	UST Salinggawi Dance Troupe	94.96
2nd	FEU Cheering Squad	93.2
3rd	UP Pep Squad	91.7
4th	Adamson Pep Squad	
5th	Ateneo Blue Babble Battalion	
6th	UE Pep Squad	
7th	NU Pep Squad	
DNP	De La Salle Pep Squad	Suspended

The Cheerdance Competition is not counted on the tabulation of the Overall Championship.

== Broadcast notes ==
ABS-CBN Corporation subsidiaries Studio 23 and The Filipino Channel broadcast the basketball playoffs series and selected elimination round games. The broadcast crew included Boom Gonzales, Ronnie Magsanoc, Sev Sarmienta and Ryan Gregorio, among others, and the courtside reporters from the participating schools.

Studio 23 also broadcast selected elimination games of women's volleyball starting January 14 (start of second round), and playoffs series in both men's and women's volleyball.

== General championship summary ==
The general champion is determined by a point system. The system gives 15 points to the champion team of a UAAP event, 12 to the runner-up, and 10 to the third placer. The following points: 8, 6, 4, 2 and 1 are given to the rest of the participating teams according to their order of finish.

=== Medals table ===
==== Seniors' division ====
Rank	Team	Gold	Silver	Bronze	Total
1	University of Santo Tomas	13	8	2	23
2	Far Eastern University	8	5	2	15
3	University of the Philippines Diliman	2	9	7	18
4	University of the East*	1	2	3	6
5	Ateneo de Manila University	1	1	10	12
6	Adamson University	1	1	2	4
7	National University	0	0	0	0
Totals (7 entries)		**26**	**26**	**26**	**78**

* Host nation (Season host); General champions
Notes: Results are final.

==== Juniors' division ====
Rank	Team	Gold	Silver	Bronze	Total
1	University of the East*	3	3	1	7
2	University of Santo Tomas	3	2	3	8
3	Ateneo de Manila University	2	2	1	5
4	UP Integrated School	1	0	3	4
5	Adamson University	0	1	1	2
6	Far Eastern University–FERN College	0	1	0	1
7	National University	0	0	0	0
Totals (7 entries)		**9**	**9**	**9**	**27**

* Host nation (Season host); General champions
Notes: Results are final.

=== General championship tally ===
==== Seniors' division ====
		Basketball		Volleyball (indoor)		Swimming		Chess		Tennis		Table tennis		Badminton		Taekwondo		Judo		Baseball	Softball	Football		Athletics		Fencing		Total		
Rank	Team	M	W	M	W	M	W	M	W	M	W	M	W	M	W	M	W	M	W	M	W	M	W	M	W	M	W	M	W	Overall
1	UST	15	15	10	15	12	15	6	15	15	15	12	15	6	12	15	15	15	12	15	10	15	12	12	12	12	8	160	171	331
2	UP	4	8	12	4	15	12	12	10	12	12	10	10	8	10	6	12	12	15	10	12	10	10	4	8	8	12	123	135	258
3	Ateneo	12	10	6	6	10	10	2	8	10	10	6	8	10	8	8	8	10	10	6	6	8	8	10	4	10	15	108	111	219
4	FEU	6	12	15	12	—	—	15	12	—	—	15	12	15	15	10	10	—	—	—	—	12	15	15	15	6	6	109	109	218
5	UE **(H)**	10	4	2	8	8	8	8	6	8	—	8	—	12	4	12	6	8	—	—	8	6	—	6	10	15	10	103	64	167
6	Adamson	8	6	4	10	—	—	10	—	—	—	—	—	4	6	—	—	6	—	12	15	—	—	8	6	—	—	52	43	95
7	NU	2	2	8	2	—	—	4	4	—	—	4	6	2	—	—	—	—	—	8	—	—	—	—	—	—	—	28	14	42

(H) Season host; = Champion; = Runner-up; = Third place; — = No team.
Notes: Results are final.

==== Juniors' division ====
		Basketball	Volleyball (indoor)		Swimming		Chess	Table tennis	Taekwondo	Athletics	Total				
Rank	Team	B	B	G	B	G	C	B	B	B	B	G	C	K	Overall
1	UST	6	12	12	10	10	10	15	15	15	73	22	10	0	105
2	UE **(H)**	4	15	15	12	12	15	12	10	8	61	27	15	0	103
3	Ateneo	15	10	—	15	—	8	8	12	12	72	0	8	0	80
4	UPIS	8	8	10	8	15	—	10	8	10	52	25	0	0	77
5	Adamson	10	—	—	—	—	12	6	—	4	20	0	12	0	32
6	FEU–FERN	12	—	—	—	—	4	—	6	6	24	0	4	0	28
7	NU	2	—	—	—	—	6	4	—	—	6	0	6	0	12

(H) Season host; = Champion; = Runner-up; = Third place; — = No team.
Notes: Results are final.

== Individual awards ==
Athletes of the Year:

- Seniors': Luica Dacanay (UP Lady Maroons, swimming)
- Juniors': Nicole Mapilisan (UST Junior Tigresses, taekwondo)

== See also ==
- 2006 UST Growling Tigers men's basketball team
- NCAA Season 82
