= 2009 PBA All-Star Week =

2009 PBA All-Star Weekend
- Date: April 22–26, 2009
- Venue: Victorias City Sports and Recreational Arena, Victorias, Negros Occidental; Panabo City Tourism, Cultural and Sports Center, Panabo, Davao del Norte; Araneta Coliseum, Quezon City
- Network: C/S9; Basketball TV (BTV)

The 2009 PBA All-Star Week was the annual all-star weekend of the Philippine Basketball Association (PBA)'s 2008–09 PBA season. This year's all-star game was different from the past All-Star games, as this year's event had 3 all-star games in different cities: Victorias, Negros Occidental (April 22), Panabo, Davao del Norte (April 24), and Quezon City (April 26).

== Wednesday events ==
C/S9

April 22

Recap

Powerade-Team Pilipinas 98, North All-Stars 80
Scoring by quarter: 28–23, 24–25, 25–10, 25–22
Pts: Mick Pennisi 15	Pts: Jhamar Thorpe 16

Victorias City Sports and Recreational Arena, Victorias, Negros Occidental

Mick Pennisi won the game's MVP honors.

== Friday events ==
C/S9

April 24

Recap

Powerade-Team Pilipinas 103, South All-Stars 99
Scoring by quarter: 28–21, 23–28, 33–13, 19–37
Pts: Jared Dillinger 12	Pts: Peter June Simon 19

Panabo City Tourism, Cultural and Sports Center, Panabo, Davao del Norte

Jared Dillinger won the game's MVP honors.

== Sunday Skills Competition ==
Held prior to the All-Star Game at the Araneta Coliseum on April 26.

=== Obstacle Challenge ===
Player	Team	1st	2nd
Paul Artadi	Barangay Ginebra Kings		36.7
LA Tenorio	Alaska Aces		37.4
Egay Billones	Burger King Whoppers		40.6

Time in seconds.

=== Three-point shootout ===
Player	Team	1st	2nd
James Yap	Purefoods Tender Juicy Giants	17	21
Dondon Hontiveros	San Miguel Beermen	16	15
Gary David	Burger King Whoppers	18	8

=== Slam Dunk competition ===
==== Imports division ====
Player	Team	1st	2nd	Total
David Noel	Barangay Ginebra Kings			82
Gabe Freeman	San Miguel Beermen			81
Anthony Johnson	Sta. Lucia Realtors			

==== Locals division ====
Player	Team	1st	2nd	Total
Gabe Norwood	Rain or Shine Elasto Painters			
Niño Canaleta	Purefoods Tender Juicy Giants	46	43	89
Jay Washington	San Miguel Beermen			
Jared Dillinger	Talk 'N Text Tropang Texters	25	–	
Kelly Williams*	Sta. Lucia Realtors	–	–	–

*did not participate due to injury.

==== Dunk-off ====
Player	Team	1st	2nd	Total
David Noel	Barangay Ginebra Kings	50	50	100
Gabe Norwood	Rain or Shine Elasto Painters	46	48	94

Judges: Nelson Beltran, Kristie Kenney, Rod Smith, "Buckets Blakes", and Joaquin Henson

== Sunday All-star Game ==
C/S9

April 26

Recap

Powerade-Team Pilipinas 89, PBA All-Stars 97
Scoring by quarter: 23–24, 23–22, 25–25, 18–26
Pts: Arwind Santos 18	Pts: David Noel 18

Araneta Coliseum, Quezon City

David Noel was named as the All-Star MVP for that leg.

== Rosters ==
Starters for the North and South teams were chosen by fan vote. PBA coaches then selected the reserves. PBA Commissioner Sonny Barrios also selected four imports for both teams. For this year, starters and imports for both teams were then combined to form a PBA selection that faced off against Powerade-Team Pilipinas. This would be the second time in league history the Philippine national team would play in the All-Star game and the first since 1998. As Chot Reyes of the Talk 'N Text Tropang Texters and Tim Cone of the Alaska Aces had led their teams to the 2008–09 Philippine Cup finals, they were selected as the head coaches for the North and South teams respectively, with Reyes handling the combined teams for their match against Team Pilipinas as he had won the championship.

The All-Star Game starters for the North and South teams were announced on April 7, 2009. Marc Pingris, Lordy Tugade, Enrico Villanueva, Paul Artadi and Macmac Cardona were announced as the starters for the North team, while Dondon Hontiveros, Jimmy Alapag, Danny Seigle, Eric Menk, and Jay Washington were announced as the starters for the South team. Tugade and Seigle were unable to play due to injuries, so their spots were given to Danny Ildefonso and Dorian Peña respectively, as they were next in line in the fan voting. Ildefonso then backed out of the All-Star game, as his six-year-old daughter was scheduled for chemotherapy treatment on the same day. His spot was not replaced.

The All-Star Game reserves for the North and South teams were announced on April 14, 2009. Jay-R Reyes, Gary David, LA Tenorio, Gabby Espinas, and Joseph Yeo were announced as the reserves for the North team, while PJ Simon, Reynel Hugnatan, John Ferriols, JR Quiñahan and Ronald Tubid were announced as the reserves for the South team.

The All-Star Game imports for the North and South teams were announced on April 17, 2009. Tiras Wade, Shawn Daniels and Jhamar Thorpe were announced as the imports for the North team, while Rosell Ellis, Jeff Varem and James Penny were selected as the imports for the South team. Thorpe became a starter for the North team. Anthony Johnson, Jai Lewis, Gabe Freeman, and David Noel were selected as the imports for the combined North and South teams.

PBA North All-Stars
Player	Team	No. of selections
Marc Pingris	San Miguel Beermen	5
Enrico Villanueva	Purefoods Tender Juicy Giants	7
Mark Cardona	Talk 'N Text Tropang Texters	3
Paul Artadi	Barangay Ginebra Kings	2
Lordy Tugade*	San Miguel Beermen	——
Reserves
Jay-R Reyes	Rain or Shine Elasto Painters	1
Gary David	Burger King Whoppers	2
LA Tenorio	Alaska Aces	1
Joseph Yeo	Sta. Lucia Realtors	2
Gabby Espinas	Barako Bull Energy Boosters	1
Danny Ildefonso***	San Miguel Beermen	8
Jhamar Thorpe	Purefoods Tender Juicy Giants	Import
Tiras Wade	Talk 'N Text Tropang Texters	Import
Shawn Daniels	Burger King Whoppers	Import
Chot Reyes	Talk 'N Text Tropang Texters	Head coach

*Did not play
**Replacement
***Ildefonso was selected as a replacement but did not play

PBA South All-Stars
Player	Team	No. of selections
Dondon Hontiveros	San Miguel Beermen	9
Jimmy Alapag	Talk 'N Text Tropang Texters	7
Eric Menk	Barangay Ginebra Kings	8
Danny Seigle*	San Miguel Beermen	——
Jay Washington	San Miguel Beermen	1
Reserves
John Ferriols	Alaska Aces	4
J.R. Quiñahan	Burger King Whoppers	1
Ronald Tubid	Barangay Ginebra Kings	4
Reynel Hugnatan	Alaska Aces	4
Peter June Simon	Purefoods Tender Juicy Giants	2
Dorian Peña**	San Miguel Beermen	2
Rosell Ellis	Alaska Aces	Import
Jeff Varem	Barako Bull Energy Boosters	Import
James Penny	Coca-Cola Tigers	Import
Tim Cone	Alaska Aces	Head coach

PBA All-Stars
Player	Team	No. of selections
Marc Pingris	San Miguel Beermen	5
Enrico Villanueva	Purefoods Tender Juicy Giants	7
Mark Cardona	Talk 'N Text Tropang Texters	3
Paul Artadi	Barangay Ginebra Kings	2
Danny Ildefonso*	San Miguel Beermen	8
Dondon Hontiveros	San Miguel Beermen	9
Jimmy Alapag	Talk 'N Text Tropang Texters	7
Eric Menk	Barangay Ginebra Kings	8
Dorian Peña	San Miguel Beermen	2
Jay Washington	San Miguel Beermen	1
Danny Seigle*	San Miguel Beermen	——
Lordy Tugade*	San Miguel Beermen	——
Gabe Freeman	San Miguel Beermen	Import
Anthony Johnson	Sta. Lucia Realtors	Import
Jai Lewis	Rain or Shine Elasto Painters	Import
David Noel	Barangay Ginebra Kings	Import
Chot Reyes	Talk 'N Text Tropang Texters	Head coach

*Did not play
**Replacement
***Ildefonso was selected as a replacement but did not play

Powerade-Team Pilipinas
Player	Team
Willie Miller	Alaska Aces
Kelly Williams	Sta. Lucia Realtors
Ranidel de Ocampo	Talk 'N Text Tropang Texters
Jayjay Helterbrand	Barangay Ginebra Kings
Gabe Norwood	Rain or Shine Elasto Painters
Mick Pennisi	San Miguel Beermen
Kerby Raymundo	Purefoods Tender Juicy Giants
James Yap	Purefoods Tender Juicy Giants
Asi Taulava	Coca-Cola Tigers
Cyrus Baguio	Barangay Ginebra Kings
Jared Dillinger	Talk 'N Text Tropang Texters
Arwind Santos	Burger King Whoppers
Ryan Reyes	Sta. Lucia Realtors
Sonny Thoss	Alaska Aces
Coach: Yeng Guiao	Burger King Whoppers

== See also ==
- 2008–09 PBA season
