= Gary David =

Filipino basketball player and politician

The Honorable Gary David
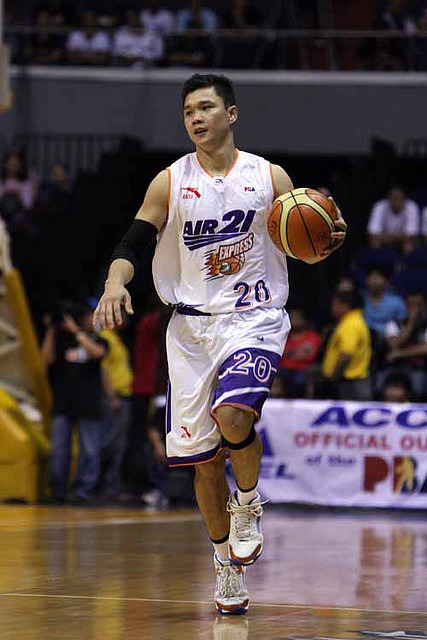
- David with Air21 in 2008

Member of the Dinalupihan Municipal Council
- Incumbent
- Assumed office June 30, 2022

Personal details
- Born: July 13, 1978 (age 48) Floridablanca, Pampanga, Philippines
- Party: NUP (2024–present)
- Other political affiliations: Aksyon Demokratiko (2021–2024)
- Occupation: Athlete, politician
- Basketball career

No. 13 – Bataan Risers
- Position: Shooting guard / assistant coach
- League: MPBL

Personal information
- Listed height: 6 ft 2 in (1.88 m)
- Listed weight: 182 lb (83 kg)

Career information
- College: Lyceum
- PBA draft: 2004: 1st round, 10th overall pick
- Drafted by: Coca-Cola Tigers
- Playing career: 2004–present
- Coaching career: 2026–present

Career history

Playing
- 2004–2005: Coca-Cola Tigers
- 2005–2010: Air21 Express / Burger King Titans / Burger King Whoopers
- 2010–2012: Coca-Cola Tigers / Powerade Tigers
- 2012–2013: GlobalPort Batang Pier
- 2013–2016: Meralco Bolts
- 2016: San Miguel Beermen
- 2016–2017: Mahindra Floodbuster
- 2018–2020: Bataan Defenders/Risers
- 2022: Pampanga Giant Lanterns
- 2026–present: Bataan Risers

Coaching
- 2026–present: Bataan Risers (assistant)

Career highlights
- PBA Best Player of the Conference (2011–12 Philippine); 5× PBA All-Star (2007, 2009, 2012–2014); PBA All-Star Game MVP (2014); PBA Most Improved Player (2007); 2× PBA Mythical First Team (2007, 2012); PBA All-Defensive First Team (2007); PBA Comeback Player of the Year (2007); PBA Sportsmanship Award (2007); 4× PBA Scoring Champion (2010–2013); MPBL All-Star (2019); PBL Most Valuable Player (2003 Sunkist-Unity); PBL Mythical First Team (2003 Sunkist-Unity); PBL Most Improved Player Award (2001-02 Challenge)

Gary Ocampo David (born July 13, 1978) is a Filipino politician and professional basketball player and assistant coach for the Bataan Risers of the Maharlika Pilipinas Basketball League (MPBL). He is a five-time All-Star and co-holds the longest streak for consecutive games recording 20 points or more. Famously known as "El Granada" or "Mr. Pure Energy", he is widely hailed by fans and Hall of Famers as one of the best scorers of all-time in the PBA.

In addition to basketball, David is also an active politician, serving as a councilor in his hometown Dinalupihan since 2022.

== College and amateur career ==
David started out as an intramural player at the Lyceum of the Philippines University, the same school he later powered to three runner-up finishes in the NCRAA versus a star-studded St. Francis of Assisi team led by behemoth brothers Yancy and Ranidel de Ocampo.

From Lyceum, he joined the Montaña Pawnshop Jewelers in the Philippine Basketball League, winning an MVP award in 2003.

== Professional career ==
=== Philippine Basketball Association ===
==== Rookie season ====
David entered the 2004 PBA Draft, and was selected as the tenth overall pick by the then-Coca-Cola Tigers. The Tigers, headed by then-coach Chot Reyes, were coming of a banner year in which they finished runners-up in the first and second conference's and winning the 2003 Reinforced Conference title in which Johnny Abarrientos, Rudy Hatfield and Jeffrey Cariaso was still in the fold. During his rookie season, David found himself coming off the bench with insignificant minutes due to the depth of the team. As the season progressed, David played more minutes as the team's sixth man but was then shipped to the Air21 Express in the middle of the season.

==== Mr. Pure Energy, multiple awards and injury ====
Air21's acquisition of David was considered a major steal in the 2005 mid-season. He immediately played significant amount minutes as he backed up then star Ren-Ren Ritualo. David brought high energy to Air21's running game and was a major factor of the Express securing the third-place finish in that season's Fiesta conference. David exploded for 19 points to carry the Express to its first-ever Final Four appearance after upsetting the Darvin Ham-led Talk 'N Text Phone Pals, 117–110, in Game 5 of the quarterfinals on January 20, 2006 in Antipolo City.

Throughout the course of the season, David improved his numbers significantly by averaging 21.3 points per game with 4.1 rebounds and 2.4 assists to go as he took the role of being the team's main man. He then got injured causing Air21's semi-finals bid to go down the drain. Despite improving his numbers and collecting numerous awards along the way, David remained an underrated superstar for most of his early years.

Prior to an unfortunate elbow injury, David was having an impressive season and was on the verge of a probable MVP award, only losing in the voting process to eventual winner Willie Miller. He also earned several awards during the season including the PBA Most Improved Player and belonged to the Mythical First Team and the All-Defensive First Team. Despite several injuries in the past, David took the cudgels as the team's go-to-guy after former franchise player Renren Ritualo was shipped to Talk 'N Text and the energetic Ronald Tubid to Ginebra.

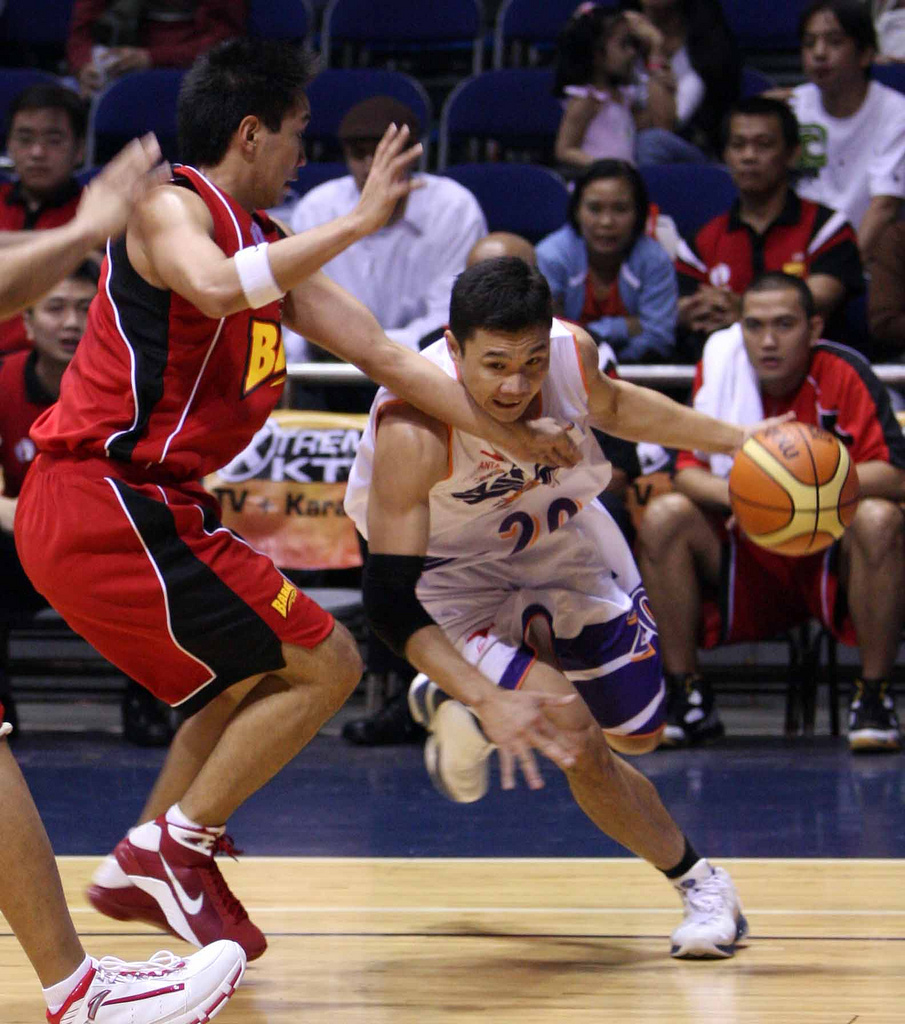
Gary David, in a game against Red Bull Barako, with the Air21 Express.

In the 2007-08 PBA season, David played only 2 games during the Philippine Cup with limited minutes due to the fact that he was still recovering from a knee injury he suffered the season before. He then came back to full action during the Fiesta Conference but mostly coming off the bench. During the middle of the conference, however, David regained his starting spot and minutes and quickly became the team's go-to-guy along with Arwind Santos. The two led the Express to 1st place in the elimination round with an 11-7 win–loss slate. The Express received an automatic semi-final berth then they faced the Magnolia Beverage Masters which they won the series 4-2. The Express barge into the Fiesta Conference Finals against the Barangay Ginebra Kings led by Best Import Chris Alexander and Best Player of the Conference Jayjay Helterbrand along with the tournament's leading scorer Mark Caguioa. The series went down to the wire which the eventually lost in seven games. David led the team in scoring again after the season, despite the injury, averaging 16.3 points per game.

David was 100% healthy and back in full force during the 2008-09 PBA season. The Express had a formidable starting lineup with Arwind Santos, Ranidel de Ocampo, Wynne Arboleda and Homer Se in his side, David immediately led the Air21 Express as one of the contenders to win the title. Unfortunately, after trading fellow star Ranidel de Ocampo to the Talk 'N Text Tropang Texters, the team only managed to muster 1 win in the next 4 games without de Ocampo. Before the trade, the Express were holding on a 7-6 win–loss record and an almost guaranteed quarterfinals seat but then went down to the wildcard phase with an 8-10 record. His team finished at a disappointing 8th spot. They faced the Purefoods Tender Juicy Giants during the first round of the wildcard phase which they convincingly won 94-82. However, they eventually lost to the San Miguel Beermen in the second round, 105-86, and failed to booked a quarterfinals seat. He led his team again in scoring during the Philippine Cup with 19.2 points per game including 4.3 rebounds and 2.2 assists.

During the Fiesta Conference, the newly named Burger King Whoppers finished at the number 4 spot and earned a twice-to-beat advantage entering the wildcard phase. They squandered the Alaska Aces, 96-90, and booked a best-of-3 quarterfinals seat against the Sta. Lucia Realtors which they also won, 2-1 and earned a spot in the final four which they were pitted against the no. 1 team San Miguel Beermen. They lost the series 4-2. David, himself, struggled during the semifinals series in which he even scored 0 in game 4, his first ever zero point performance since his rookie season. The Whoppers won third place honors.

==== Return to Coca-Cola and struggles ====
Before the start of the 2009-10 PBA season, David's tandem partner Arwind Santos, was traded to the San Miguel Beermen in exchange for power forward Marc Pingris and sophomore Ken Bono plus San Miguel's first round pick in the 2010 Draft. Burger King got the first overall pick in the 2009 Draft in which they used to get the 6-foot-9 forward Japeth Aguilar. But shortly after Japeth's PBA Debut, he was then traded to the Talk 'N Text Tropang Texters for him to be able to play for the Smart Gilas Pilipinas National Team. David was yet again left alone. Expected to lead his team all by himself, David started slow during the 2009–10 Philippine Cup by only averaging 14.1 points per game and only winning 5 out of 16 games with the Burger King Whoppers. At that point, he was already asking for a trade. On January 4, 2010, he was then traded to the Coca-Cola Tigers for Alex Cabagnot and Wesley Gonzales. Because of their dismal record before David's arrival, Coca-Cola ended up in the wildcard phase. They faced David's former team Burger King Whoppers in the first round of the wildcard and beat 118-112 but were eventually eliminated by the Rain or Shine Elasto Painters after losing, 84-99. He teamed up with Asi Taulava to form a dangerous duo.

2010 PBA Fiesta Conference was a blast for David as he led the PBA in scoring with 21.9 points per game along with 3.4 rebounds and 2.3 assists per game. The Tigers started out the conference winning four of their first five assignments but shortly after, they suffered a 6-game losing streak that affected their bid for the automatic quarterfinal berth. And due again to the lack of support, his team again wounded up in the wildcard phase with an 8–10 record. They easily beat the Sta. Lucia Realtors, 100-84, to move on to the second phase of the wildcard stage but were met again by the Rain or Shine Elasto Painters. They were eliminated again by the Rain or Shine Elasto Painters, 98-93, and took the final spot in the Quarterfinals. Despite being the league's leading scorer, a poor finish by the team caused David to lose the Best Player of the Conference Award to San Miguel Beermen's Jay Washington.

==== Coca-Cola Tigers / Powerade Tigers ====
===== 2010–11 season =====
David started strong in the Philippine Cup, averaging a league best 21.5 points while adding 3.3 rebounds and 3.5 assists. However, his team failed to reach the quarterfinals and was eliminated with a dismal 3–11 record, highlighted by an 8-game losing streak.

With only 9 remaining games to be played in the Commissioner's Cup, David quickly got his game going as he led the league again in scoring with an average of 23.5 points along with 3.0 rebounds and 2.6 assists, highlighted by back-to-back 30-point performances, dropping 36 points against the Brgy. Ginebra Kings and 35 points against the San Miguel Beermen. Unfortunately, the Tigers once again failed to reach the playoffs, as they finished in 9th place with a 2–7 record.

In the Governors Cup, David was only able to play 5 games because of an injury. Still, he still managed to produce 19.6 points, 2.6 rebounds and 1.4 assists. Despite being tied with Rain or Shine and B-Meg after compiling a 4–4 record, Powerade did not make the playoffs as the quotient system did not favor them.

===== 2011–12 season =====
In the 2011–12 PBA Philippine Cup, David led his team to 6 wins and 8 losses during eliminations, as Powerade finished 8th to begin the playoffs. The team pulled off a huge upset as they defeated the 1st seeded B-Meg Llamados twice to advance to the next round. This marked the Tigers' first semi-finals appearance in 7 years, the last being in 2004.

During the playoffs, Gary David scored 30 points or more in almost every game. Impressed by David's string of high-scoring games, veteran PBA statistician Fidel Mangonon commented via Facebook: "Since I worked in the PBA starting in late '91 as a sportswriter, Gary David is the 1st local player to score at least 30 pts in 5 straight games." In their next game, David had another 30-point outing as he extended his streak to 6 consecutive games. He was able to anchor his team past the Rain or Shine in the semifinals. Powerade battled with the Talk 'N Text Tropang Texters in the Finals series. Despite the Tropang Texters beating Powerade in 5 games to become back-to-back Philippine Cup champions, David's sterling performance is still regarded as one of the best in PBA playoff/finals history.

David was named the Best Player of the Conference for the PBA Philippine Cup, beating Petron Blaze Boosters' Arwind Santos, despite the latter leading in statistical points. David became just the third player from the Coca-Cola franchise to win the plum after Jeffrey Cariaso and Rudy Hatfield. He also became the first and only player from an eighth-seeded team to receive the award. David tallied averages of 25 points, 3.8 rebounds, 2.4 assists and a steal per game in the Philippine Cup.

In the early days of February, it was reported that David will be rewarded accordingly by his team, to be given a three-year contract-extension deal worth P15.1 million. Powerade top official JB Baylon has confirmed that they are giving David the maximum monthly pay of P420,000—allowed under the league's amended salary cap rule. With David's constant improvement came his wage increases. He received P250,000 a month in 2009, P300,000 in 2010 and P350,000 at present.

On March 25, 2012, he became the 64th and latest member of the PBA 5,000-point club, a plateau he reached with his first of two charities at the 3:43 mark of the third period.

==== Meralco Bolts ====
On October 11, 2013, David was traded to the Meralco Bolts with AJ Mandani in exchange for Chris Ross, Chris Timberlake and Meralco's 2016 and 2017 second round picks He made his debut in a Bolts' uniform on November 17 in a losing effort against the Talk 'N Text Tropang Texters, 80-89, scoring 26 points and grabbing 7 rebounds.

On March 13, 2016, David was penalized by the management of Meralco Bolts due to "insubordination, lack of dedication to the team; and breach of contract which states that he's obligated to play in official PBA games at all times" during a game against NLEX Road Warriors in the 2016 PBA Commissioner's Cup, according to the One Meralco Sports' website.

David was seated in the bench during the game period. At the fourth quarter, coach Norman Black asked David to check in, but he said that he does not want to play. In an investigation, the team cleared that there were no physical impediments for Gary not to enter the game. Meralco suspended David for one game and fined for an undisclosed amount of money. The suspension was served during the team's game against Blackwater Elite on March 18. In his part, David states that he is suffering an ankle injury during the game and asked his fans to understand his current situation. Four days later, David was officially dropped from the Meralco roster, becoming an unrestricted free agent in the process.

==== San Miguel Beermen ====
On April 7, 2016, after weeks of speculation on where David would sign, his agent confirmed that David is set to play for the San Miguel Beermen.

==== Mahindra Floodbuster ====
On November 29, 2016, David signed a 1-year contract with Mahindra Floodbuster. He was waived from the team on May 30, 2017.

=== Maharlika Pilipinas Basketball League ===
==== Bataan Defenders ====
David debuted at the Maharlika Pilipinas Basketball League with the Bataan Defenders in February 2018.

== PBA career statistics ==
Legend
| GP | Games played | MPG | Minutes per game |
| FG% | Field-goal percentage | 3P% | 3-point field-goal percentage | FT% | Free-throw percentage |
| RPG | Rebounds per game | APG | Assists per game | SPG | Steals per game |
| BPG | Blocks per game | PPG | Points per game | **Bold** | Career high |

| Led the league |

=== Season-by-season averages ===
| Year | Team | GP | MPG | FG% | 3P% | FT% | RPG | APG | SPG | BPG | PPG |
|---|---|---|---|---|---|---|---|---|---|---|---|
| 2004–05 | Coca-Cola | **53** | 15.0 | .384 | .263 | .718 | 2.1 | 1.0 | .4 | .1 | 6.9 |
| 2004–05 | FedEx | **53** | 15.0 | .384 | .263 | .718 | 2.1 | 1.0 | .4 | .1 | 6.9 |
| 2005–06 | Air21 | 27 | 17.6 | .437 | .276 | .722 | 1.8 | .7 | .4 | **.2** | 9.9 |
| 2006–07 | Air21 | 39 | 31.8 | **.476** | .303 | .829 | 3.4 | 1.7 | **.9** | .1 | 20.6 |
| 2007–08 | Air21 | 33 | 27.2 | .413 | .360 | .812 | 2.4 | 1.3 | .5 | .1 | 15.4 |
| 2008–09 | Air21 / Burger King | 45 | 28.9 | .423 | .290 | .850 | 3.6 | 2.1 | .6 | .1 | 17.2 |
| 2009–10 | Burger King | 39 | 31.5 | .452 | .320 | .795 | 3.3 | 2.3 | .7 | .1 | 18.2 |
| 2009–10 | Coca-Cola | 39 | 31.5 | .452 | .320 | .795 | 3.3 | 2.3 | .7 | .1 | 18.2 |
| 2010–11 | Powerade | 28 | 35.0 | .448 | **.368** | .810 | 3.1 | **2.8** | .6 | **.2** | 21.8 |
| 2011–12 | Powerade | 49 | **37.3** | .439 | .362 | **.853** | 3.8 | 2.3 | **.9** | .1 | **25.8** |
| 2012–13 | GlobalPort | 31 | 34.4 | .387 | .300 | .849 | 3.4 | 1.3 | .5 | .1 | 18.8 |
| 2013–14 | Meralco | 36 | 35.2 | .414 | .332 | .799 | **4.6** | 1.9 | .5 | .1 | 16.5 |
| 2014–15 | Meralco | 42 | 26.7 | .403 | .327 | .822 | 2.7 | 1.7 | .6 | .1 | 13.3 |
| 2015–16 | Meralco | 35 | 17.6 | .422 | .354 | .755 | 1.9 | .6 | .3 | .1 | 8.5 |
| 2015–16 | San Miguel | 35 | 17.6 | .422 | .354 | .755 | 1.9 | .6 | .3 | .1 | 8.5 |
| 2016–17 | Mahindra | 8 | 12.2 | .345 | .296 | .600 | 1.3 | .3 | .5 | .0 | 6.5 |
| Career | | 465 | 27.7 | .427 | .328 | .817 | 3.0 | 1.6 | .5 | .1 | 15.9 |

== National team career ==
After winning the MVP plum in 2003 in the PBL, David was chosen to be part of the Philippine team that would compete in the 2003 Southeast Asian Games, starring alongside college rival Ranidel De Ocampo, University of the East star James Yap, Ateneo de Manila's Rich Alvarez, and PSBA's Marc Pingris. They won the tournament and brought home the gold medal.

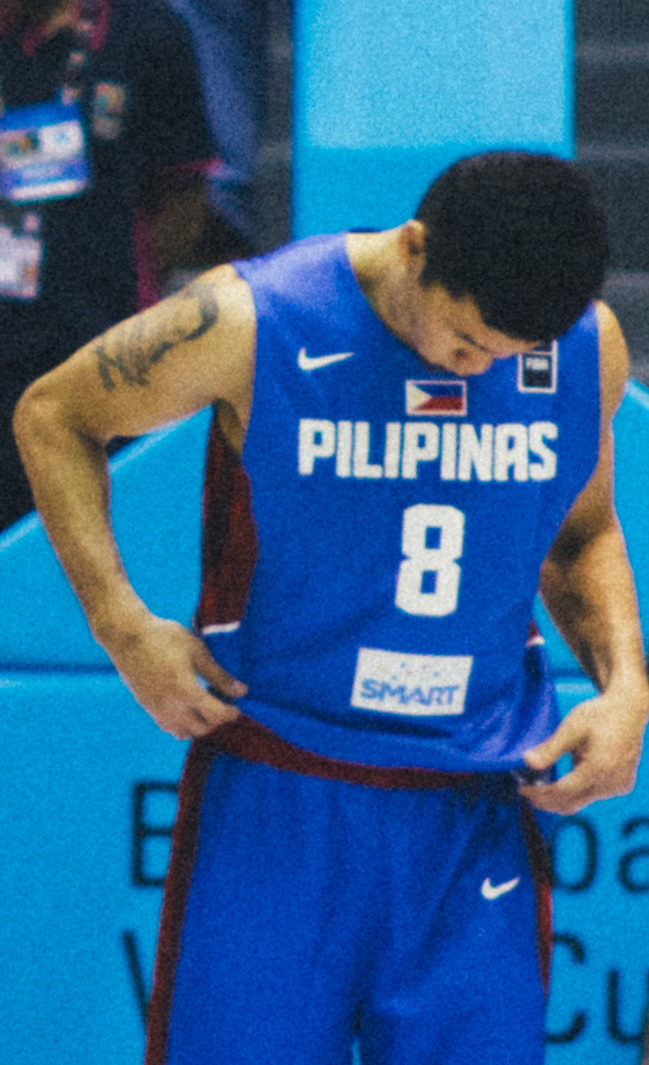
David at the 2014 FIBA Basketball World Cup

David was then chosen to be part of the Smart Gilas Pilipinas 2.0 that would be built to compete for the 2014 World Championships. In August 2012, the national team competed in its first international tournament, the 2012 William Jones Cup. In the team's third assignment, they faced long time rival South Korea. David bailed out the Nationals, who squandered a 14-point lead before trailing by 12, with two clutch baskets in a row to propel the Philippines to a 3-0 start. They then beat Japan in the next game thanks to a rally that was started by David after hitting a three-pointer after being down by nine. After losing to Lebanon, David helped the Nationals beat 3-time defending champions Iran, 77-75 in thrilling fashion. He then led the Nationals along with LA Tenorio, to win the gold medal in the 2012 Jones Cup after beating the USA select team, 76-75. It was the country's first championship in the Asian level since the Philippine Centennial Team anchored by coach Tim Cone ruled the 1998 edition of the Jones Cup.

He was part of the squad that took the silver in the 2013 FIBA Asia Championship. He was also included in the national team's final lineup for the 2014 FIBA Basketball World Cup and the 2014 Asian Games. He was also included in the initial pool for the 2015 FIBA Asia Championship but did not make the cut.

== Personal life ==
David is a native of Dinalupihan, Bataan.

Aware that he cannot play basketball forever, David has made a few investments, including a 10-door residential/commercial apartment in Pandi, Bulacan. He also plans to add more apartment units and enter the livestock business.
