= 2009 PBA Fiesta Conference =

Philippine basketball tournament

- Duration: February 28 – July 17, 2009
- TV partner(s): C/S9, Basketball TV (Local); The Filipino Channel (International)

Finals
- Champions: San Miguel Beermen
- Runners-up: Barangay Ginebra Kings

Awards
- Best Player: Jayjay Helterbrand (Barangay Ginebra Kings)
- Best Import: Gabe Freeman (San Miguel Beermen)
- Finals MVP: Jonas Villanueva (San Miguel Beermen)

PBA Fiesta Conference chronology
- < 2008 2010 >

PBA conference chronology
- < 2008–09 Philippine 2009–10 Philippine >

The 2009 Philippine Basketball Association (PBA) Fiesta Conference or known as the 2009 Motolite PBA Fiesta Conference for sponsorship reasons, was the last conference of the 2008-09 PBA season. It started on February 28 and finished on July 17. The tournament was shortened to accommodate the training of the national basketball team for the FIBA Asia Championship 2009 qualifying tournament for the 2010 FIBA World Championship. The last conference had games on Thursdays and Saturdays. The tournament is an import-laden format, which allows an import or a non-Filipino player for each team and with a new height limit of 6-foot-6.

Two teams had new names before the start of the conference: the former Red Bull Barako was now known as the Barako Bull Energy Boosters, and the former Air21 Express were called as the Burger King Titans. However, with the failure of several business deals that would have changed the franchise's upper management, the Titans renamed into the Burger King Whoppers by their seventh game into the conference, retaining their old management headed by the Lina family.

== Format ==
The following format was observed for the duration of the conference:

- The teams were divided into 2 groups, based on their performance in the 2008–09 PBA Philippine Cup elimination round. Group A are teams that finished the Philippine Cup's elimination round in 1st, 4th, 5th, 8th and 9th positions, while Group B are the 2nd, 3rd, 6th, 7th and 10th.

Group A:

1. Alaska Aces
2. Burger King Whoppers
3. Coca-Cola Tigers
4. Rain or Shine Elasto Painters
5. Sta. Lucia Realtors

Group B:

1. Barako Bull Energy Boosters
2. Barangay Ginebra Kings
3. Purefoods Tender Juicy Giants
4. San Miguel Beermen
5. Talk 'N Text Tropang Texters

- Teams in a group will play against each other once and against teams in the other group twice; 14 games per team; Teams are then seeded by basis on win–loss records. Ties are broken among point differentials of the tied teams, except for ties for #2, #5 and #8. Standings will be determined in one league table; teams do not qualify by basis of groupings.
- Wildcard phase:
  - WC1: #3 vs. #10, with #3 having the twice-to-beat advantage
  - WC2: #4 vs. #9, with #4 having the twice-to-beat advantage
  - WC3: #5 vs. #8 in a knockout game
  - WC4: #6 vs. #7 in a knockout game
- Best-of-three quarterfinals:
  - QF1: WC2 vs. WC3
  - QF2: WC1 vs. WC4
- Best-of-seven semifinals:
  - SF1: QF1 vs. #1
  - SF2: QF2 vs. #2
- Third-place playoff: losers of the semifinals
- Best-of-seven Finals: winners of the semifinals
- This is basically same format used throughout the 2004-05 PBA season, save for WC3 and WC4 were conducted in a best-of-3 series.

== Classification round ==
The May 17 game between the Barangay Ginebra Kings and the Alaska Aces held at the Albay Astrodome in Legaspi was canceled when the playing court was judged as too slippery, with Ginebra leading 9–2, and 8:04 remaining in the first quarter. The game was stopped twice and the stoppages lasted two hours before the game was canceled. The game was restarted at the Araneta Coliseum on May 22.

=== Team standings ===
Pos	Team	W	L	PCT	GB	Qualification
1	San Miguel Beermen	11	3	.786	—	Advance to semifinals
2	Barangay Ginebra Kings	8	6	.571 (Note: Head-to-head differential: Rain or Shine +15, Barangay Ginebra −7, Burger King −8; second seed playoff: Barangay Ginebra 114–71 Rain or Shine)	3	Advance to semifinals
3	Rain or Shine Elasto Painters	8	6	.571	3	Twice-to-beat in the wildcard round
4	Burger King Whoppers	8	6	.571	3	Twice-to-beat in the wildcard round
5	Sta. Lucia Realtors	7	7	.500 (Note: Head-to-head differential: Sta. Lucia +7, Purefoods +3, Talk 'N Text −10)	4	Knockout in the wildcard round
6	Purefoods Tender Juicy Giants	7	7	.500	4	Knockout in the wildcard round
7	Talk 'N Text Tropang Texters	7	7	.500	4	Knockout in the wildcard round
8	Coca-Cola Tigers	6	8	.429 (Note: Eighth seed playoff: Coca-Cola 81–74 Alaska)	5	Knockout in the wildcard round
9	Alaska Aces	6	8	.429	5	Twice-to-win in the wildcard round
10	Barako Bull Energy Boosters	2	12	.143	9	Twice-to-win in the wildcard round

Source: PBA.ph

=== Results ===
- Results above and to the left of the gray boxes are first round games; those below and to the right are second round games.

Team	ALA	BBE	BGK	BKW	COKE	PF	ROS	SMB	SLR	TNT
Alaska		90–92	82–81	88–106	85–89	94–84	94–96	89–93	90–100	122–124
Barako Bull	90–100		103–111	110–123	103–106	92–96	83–93	92–99	91–100	135–132
Barangay Ginebra	75–76			106–110	110–103	107–105	93–107	80–95	76–80	97–90
Burger King		99–89	94–100		127–109	78–82	112–118	105–114	96–84	105–118
Coca-Cola		120–106	85–122			89–80	94–91*	91–106	88–79	111–133
Purefoods	74–80			86–96	92–85		102–94*	103–122	93–91	131–121
Rain or Shine		103–97	89–94			110–90		95–102	100–109	96–102
San Miguel	91–84			105–107*	89–105		72–82		92–90	98–87
Sta. Lucia		98–88	98–101			104–95	90–82	92–98		106–100
Talk 'N Text	115–122*			129–135**	103–00		116–118*		97–91	

Legend: Blue = left column team win; Red = top row team win.
Matches with lighter background shading were decided after overtime.

== Eighth seed playoff ==
C/S9

May 24

8th seed

Coca-Cola Tigers 81, Alaska Aces 74

Ynares Center, Antipolo, Rizal

== Second seed playoff ==
C/S9

May 24

2nd seed

Rain or Shine Elasto Painters 71, Barangay Ginebra Kings 114

Ynares Center, Antipolo, Rizal

== Bracket ==
Wildcard phase
(#4 twice-to-beat)
4	Burger King	96
9	Alaska	90
(Single-elimination)
5	Sta. Lucia	94
8	Coca-Cola	88
(#3 twice to beat)
3	Rain or Shine	96
10	Barako Bull	88
(Single-elimination)
6	Purefoods (2OT)	126
7	Talk 'N Text	123

Quarterfinals (Best-of-3)
4	Burger King	2
5	Sta. Lucia	1
3	Rain or Shine	2
6	Purefoods	1

Semifinals (Best-of-7)
1	San Miguel	4
4	Burger King	2
2	Ginebra	4
3	Rain or Shine	2

Finals (Best-of-7)
1	San Miguel	4
2	Ginebra	3
Third place playoff
4	Burger King	132
3	Rain or Shine	118

== Wildcard phase ==
=== (3) Rain or Shine vs. (10) Barako Bull ===
Rain or Shine has the twice-to-beat advantage.

C/S9

May 27

Recap

Rain or Shine Elasto Painters 96, Barako Bull Energy Boosters 88
Rain or Shine wins series in one game

Araneta Coliseum, Quezon City

=== (4) Burger King vs. (9) Alaska ===
Burger King has the twice-to-beat advantage.

C/S9

May 27

Recap

Burger King Whoppers 96, Alaska Aces 90
Burger King wins series in one game

Araneta Coliseum, Quezon City

=== (5) Sta. Lucia vs. (8) Coca-Cola ===
This is a single-elimination game.

C/S9

May 29

Recap

Sta. Lucia Realtors 94, Coca-Cola Tigers 88

Araneta Coliseum, Quezon City

=== (6) Purefoods vs. (7) Talk 'N Text ===
This is a single-elimination game.

C/S9

May 29

Recap

Purefoods Tender Juicy Giants 126, Talk 'N Text Tropang Texters 123 (2OT)

Araneta Coliseum, Quezon City

== Quarterfinals ==
=== (3) Rain or Shine vs. (6) Purefoods ===
C/S9

May 31

Recap

Rain or Shine Elasto Painters 96, Purefoods Tender Juicy Giants 87

Araneta Coliseum, Quezon City

C/S9

June 3

Recap

Rain or Shine Elasto Painters 82, Purefoods Tender Juicy Giants 84

Araneta Coliseum, Quezon City

C/S9

June 14

Rain or Shine Elasto Painters 93, Purefoods Tender Juicy Giants 89
Rain or Shine wins series 2–1

Araneta Coliseum, Quezon City

=== (4) Burger King vs. (5) Sta. Lucia ===
C/S9

May 31

Recap

Burger King Whoppers 84, Sta. Lucia Realtors 93

Araneta Coliseum, Quezon City

C/S9

June 3

Recap

Burger King Whoppers 94, Sta. Lucia Realtors 81

Araneta Coliseum, Quezon City

C/S9

June 14

Burger King Whoppers 120, Sta. Lucia Realtors 72
Burger King wins series 2–1

Araneta Coliseum, Quezon City

== Semifinals ==
=== (1) San Miguel vs (4) Burger King ===
C/S9

June 17

Recap

San Miguel Beermen 102, Burger King Whoppers 87

Araneta Coliseum, Quezon City

C/S9

June 19

Recap

San Miguel Beermen 113, Burger King Whoppers 116

Cuneta Astrodome, Pasay

C/S9

June 21

Recap

San Miguel Beermen 100, Burger King Whoppers 88

Araneta Coliseum, Quezon City

C/S9

June 24

Recap

San Miguel Beermen 120, Burger King Whoppers 119 (2OT)

Araneta Coliseum, Quezon City

C/S9

June 26

Recap

San Miguel Beermen 90, Burger King Whoppers 103

Araneta Coliseum, Quezon City

C/S9

June 28

San Miguel Beermen 118, Burger King Whoppers 103
San Miguel wins series, 4–2

Araneta Coliseum, Quezon City

=== (2) Barangay Ginebra vs (3) Rain or Shine ===
C/S9

June 17

Recap

Barangay Ginebra Kings 95, Rain or Shine Elasto Painters 101

Araneta Coliseum, Quezon City

C/S9

June 19

Recap

Barangay Ginebra Kings 103, Rain or Shine Elasto Painters 98

Cuneta Astrodome, Pasay

C/S9

June 21

Recap

Barangay Ginebra Kings 88, Rain or Shine Elasto Painters 94

Araneta Coliseum, Quezon City

C/S9

June 24

Recap

Barangay Ginebra Kings 86, Rain or Shine Elasto Painters 70

Araneta Coliseum, Quezon City

C/S9

June 26

Recap

Barangay Ginebra Kings 96, Rain or Shine Elasto Painters 85

Araneta Coliseum, Quezon City

C/S9

June 28

Recap

Barangay Ginebra Kings 108, Rain or Shine Elasto Painters 100
Barangay Ginebra wins series, 4–2

Araneta Coliseum, Quezon City

== Third place playoff ==
C/S9

July 1

Recap

Rain or Shine Elasto Painters 118, Burger King Whoppers 132

Araneta Coliseum, Quezon City

== Finals ==
C/S9

July 1

Recap

San Miguel Beermen 96, Barangay Ginebra Kings 102

Araneta Coliseum, Quezon City

C/S9

July 3

Recap

San Miguel Beermen 95, Barangay Ginebra Kings 78

Araneta Coliseum, Quezon City

C/S9

July 5

Recap

San Miguel Beermen 103, Barangay Ginebra Kings 116

Araneta Coliseum, Quezon City

C/S9

July 8

Recap

San Miguel Beermen 106, Barangay Ginebra Kings 104

Araneta Coliseum, Quezon City

C/S9

July 13

Recap

San Miguel Beermen 98, Barangay Ginebra Kings 106

Araneta Coliseum, Quezon City

C/S9

July 15

Recap

San Miguel Beermen 98, Barangay Ginebra Kings 84

Araneta Coliseum, Quezon City

C/S9

July 17

San Miguel Beermen 90, Barangay Ginebra Kings 79
San Miguel wins series, 4–3

Araneta Coliseum, Quezon City

== Awards ==
- Fern-C Finals MVP: Jonas Villanueva
- Best Player of the Conference: Jayjay Helterbrand
- Best Import of the Conference: Gabe Freeman

=== Players of the Week ===
Week	Player(s)	Team(s)
February 28–March 8	Jonas Villanueva	San Miguel Beermen
March 9–15	Marlou Aquino	Sta. Lucia Realtors
March 16–22	Arwind Santos	Burger King Titans
March 23–29	Ronald Tubid	Barangay Ginebra Kings
April 12–20	Eric Menk	Barangay Ginebra Kings
April 27–May 3	Arwind Santos	Burger King Whoppers
May 4–10	Jayjay Helterbrand	Barangay Ginebra Kings
May 11–17	Jimmy Alapag	Talk 'N Text Tropang Texters
May 18–24	Asi Taulava; Ronald Tubid	Coca-Cola Tigers; Barangay Ginebra Kings
May 25–31	Gabe Norwood; Nelbert Omolon	Rain or Shine Elasto Painters; Sta. Lucia Realtors
June 3 and 14	Arwind Santos	Burger King Whoppers
June 15–21	Gabe Norwood	Rain or Shine Elasto Painters
June 22–28	Jayjay Helterbrand	Barangay Ginebra Kings

== Statistical leaders ==
=== Locals ===
Category	Player	Team	Stat	GP
Points per game	Arwind Santos	Burger King Whoppers	19.36	14
Rebounds per game	Asi Taulava	Coca-Cola Tigers	12.08	13
Assists per game	Jimmy Alapag	Talk 'N Text Tropang Texters	6.07	14
Steals per game	Warren Ybanez	Barako Bull Energy Boosters	1.45	11
Blocks per game	Marlou Aquino*	Sta. Lucia Realtors	2.43	14
Field goal percentage	Ali Peek*	Talk 'N Text Tropang Texters	.667	14
Free throw percentage	Jayjay Helterbrand*	Barangay Ginebra Kings	.877	13
Three-point field goal percentage	Don Dulay*	Rain or Shine Elasto Painters	.457	14

*refers that the local had a higher statistic than an import

=== Imports ===
Category	Player	Team	Stat	GP
Points per game	Rashad Bell	Talk 'N Text Tropang Texters	32.50	2
Rebounds per game	Jai Lewis	Rain or Shine Elasto Painters	16.80	12
Assists per game	David Noel	Barangay Ginebra Kings	6.40	5
Steals per game	David Noel	Barangay Ginebra Kings	2.20	5
Blocks per game	Shawn Daniels	Burger King Whoopers	2.40	14
Field goal percentage	Jai Lewis	Rain or Shine Elasto Painters	.563	12
Free throw percentage	Rashad Bell	Talk 'N Text Tropang Texters	.857	12
Three-point field goal percentage	David Noel	Barangay Ginebra Kings	.438	5

== Imports ==
The following is the list of imports, which had played for their respective teams at least once, with the returning imports in italics. Highlighted are the imports who stayed with their respective teams for the whole conference.

Name	Team	Debuted	Last game	Record
(United States) Shawn Daniels	Burger King Titans	February 28	July 1	13–11
(United States) Anthony Johnson	Sta. Lucia Realtors	February 28	June 14	9–9
(United States) Charles Clark	Rain or Shine Elasto Painters	March 1	March 7	1–1
(United States) Scooter McFadgon	Barako Bull Energy Boosters	March 1	March 28	2–5
(United States) Tiras Wade	Talk 'N Text Tropang Texters	March 1	May 1	5–4
(United States) Brian Hamilton	Purefoods TJ Giants	March 1	March 15	2–2
(United States) Galen Young	Alaska Aces	March 4	March 12	0–3
(United States) JJ Sullinger	Coca-Cola Tigers	March 4	March 20	1–4
(United States) Rod Nealy	Barangay Ginebra Kings	March 4	April 3	2–5
(United States) Gabe Freeman	San Miguel Beermen	March 8	July 17	15–6
(United States) Jai Lewis	Rain or Shine Elasto Painters (2)	March 12	July 1	13–9
(United States) Rosell Ellis	Alaska Aces (2)	March 14	May 27	6–7
(United States) Jhamar Thorpe	Purefoods TJ Giants (2)	March 21	April 19	2–2
(United States) James Penny	Coca-Cola Tigers (2)	March 26	May 29	5–4
(United States) Jeff Varem	barako Bull Energy Boosters (2)	April 17	May 1	0–3
(United States) David Noel	Barangay Ginebra Kings (2)	April 20	July 17	14–6
(United States) Marquin Chandler	Purefoods TJ Giants (3)	April 29	June 14	5–4
(United States) Daryan Selvy	Barako Bull Energy Boosters (3)	May 3	May 15	0–3
(Panama) Gary Forbes	Talk 'N Text Tropang Texters (2)	May 3	May 6	1–1
(United States) Rashad Bell	Talk 'N Text Tropang Texters (3)	May 13	May 29	1–2
(United States) Chris Williams	San Miguel Beermen (2)	May 17	May 22	1–1
(United States) Jamaal Williams	Barako Bull Energy Boosters (4)	May 27	May 27	0–1
All-Filipino line up	San Miguel Beermen	March 4	--	1–0
All-Filipino line up	Barangay Ginebra Kings	April 17	--	1–0
All-Filipino line up	Talk 'N Text Tropang Texters	May 1	--	0–1
