= PBA Fiesta Conference =

- Founded: 2004
- First season: 2004
- Folded: 2010
- Last champion: Alaska Aces (2nd title) (2010)

The PBA Fiesta Conference was a former tournament held during a Philippine Basketball Association season. Each PBA team was allowed to hire a single foreign player, with maximum height limitations set by the league, to play for the said tournament.

== History ==
Prior to the formation of the said conference, the league had two import-laced conferences known as the PBA Commissioner's Cup (with an import height-limit of 6 feet 8 inches (2.03 m)), and the PBA Governor's Cup (with an import height-limit of 6 feet 4 inches (1.93 m)). However, in 2003, the two conferences were scrapped and was replaced with an Invitational tournament, with an All-Filipino local squad along with foreign teams) and an import-laced Reinforced Conference.

But, in 2004, the league changed its calendar from a calendar year to a fiscal year. As a preparation for the new format, the tournament was institutionalized in 2004 as a transitional tournament. The first Fiesta Conference was played from February–July 2004, which was won by the Barangay Ginebra Kings.

In 2005, the league billed the Reinforced Conference as the Fiesta Conference, with a new rule of allowing teams to allow imports with unlimited height limit. The San Miguel Beermen defeated the Talk N' Text Phone Pals to win the title.

A season later, the league moved the Fiesta Conference during its initial conference, this time the height limit rule on imports were reinstated, this time at 6 feet 6 inches (1.98 m). Red Bull Barako won the third edition of the Fiesta Cup, defeating the Purefoods Chunkee Giants in six games.

For the 2006-07 PBA season, the league is moved the Fiesta Conference to March, while putting the Philippine Cup as its opening tournament (October) for the said season.

For the 2008 Fiesta Conference, all teams were allowed to field in imports without height restrictions with the two worst teams on the previous conference having another import but with a 6 feet 1 inch (1.85 m) height restriction.

For the 2009 Fiesta Conference, the 6 feet 6 inches (1.98 m) height limit was reinstated again.

After the re-adaption of the three conference format starting the 2010-11 season, the tournament was retired to make way for the returning conferences, the Commissioner's and Governors Cup.

== Fiesta Conference finals results ==
Season	Champion	Runner-up	Series	Finals MVP	Details
2004	Barangay Ginebra	Red Bull	3–1	Eric Menk	Details
2004–05	San Miguel	Talk 'N Text	4–1	Danny Ildefonso	Details
2005–06	Red Bull	Purefoods	4–2	Lordy Tugade	Details
2006–07	Alaska	Talk 'N Text	4–3	Willie Miller	Details
2007–08	Barangay Ginebra	Air21	4–3	Eric Menk and Ronald Tubid	Details
2008–09	San Miguel	Barangay Ginebra	4–3	Jonas Villanueva	Details
2009–10	Alaska	San Miguel	4–2	LA Tenorio and Cyrus Baguio	Details

== Most Championships ==
=== By team ===
- Barangay Ginebra (2)
- San Miguel (2)
- Alaska (2)
- Red Bull (1)

=== By coaches ===
- Jong Uichico (2)
- Siot Tanquingcen (2)
- Tim Cone (2)
- Yeng Guiao (1)

== Individual awards ==
Season	Best player (Team)	Best import (Team)
(2004)	Eric Menk (Ginebra)	(United States) Victor Thomas (Red Bull)
2004–05	Willie Miller (Talk N' Text)	(United States) Jerald Honeycutt (Talk N' Text)
2005–06	Enrico Villanueva (Red Bull)	(United States) Marquin Chandler (Purefoods)
2006–07	Mark Cardona (Talk N' Text)	(United States) Rosell Ellis (Alaska)
2007–08	Jayjay Helterbrand (Ginebra)	(United States) Chris Alexander (Ginebra)
2008–09	Jayjay Helterbrand (Ginebra)	(United States) Gabe Freeman (San Miguel)
2009–10	Jay Washington (San Miguel)	(United States) Gabe Freeman (San Miguel)
