= 2009 PBA Fiesta Conference finals =

Best-of-7 championship series of the 2009 PBA Fiesta Conference

Team	Coach	Wins
(1) San Miguel Beermen	Siot Tanquingcen	4
(2) Barangay Ginebra Kings	Jong Uichico	3
- Dates: July 1–17, 2009
- MVP: Jonas Villanueva
- Television: C/S9, BTV, TFC
- Announcers: See broadcast notes
- Radio network: Sports Radio 918
- Announcers: See broadcast notes

Referees
- Game 1: Cruz, Aldaba, Quilinguen
- Game 2: Montiel, Balao, Sambrano, N.
- Game 3: Aldaba, Herrera, Ferrer
- Game 4: Cruz, Ngo, Pascual
- Game 5: Herrera, Ferrer, Mangibin R.
- Game 6: Aldaba, Quilinguen, Sambrano N.
- Game 7: Aldaba, Herrera, Ferrer

PBA Fiesta Conference finals chronology
- < 2008 2010 >

PBA finals chronology
- < 2008–09 Philippine 2009–10 Philippine >

The 2009 PBA Fiesta Conference finals was the best-of-7 championship series of the 2009 PBA Fiesta Conference and the conclusion of the conference's playoffs. The series was a best-of-seven affair and was the 97th championship disputed in the league. The teams competing are first-seed San Miguel Beermen and the second-seed defending champions Barangay Ginebra Kings, two of the three San Miguel Corporation-owned teams.

This was the fourth time the two teams meet in the finals, with San Miguel winning their first two meetings (1989 Reinforced Conference and the 2001 All Filipino Cup). Barangay Ginebra won their latest finals meeting on the conclusion of the 2006–07 PBA Philippine Cup.

This was also the first time in PBA history that a champion of the previous year's Fiesta Conference was able to enter the finals to defend their crown.

After a full 7-game series, San Miguel held off Ginebra in game 7 with an emphatic 90–79 win, with Jonas Villanueva awarded as the Finals MVP.

== Background ==
=== Road to the finals ===
San Miguel		Barangay Ginebra
Finished 11–3 (0.785)–1st	Elimination round	Finished 8–6 (0.571)–Tied for 2nd
Finished 11–3 (0.785)–1st	Tiebreaker	114–71, against Rain or Shine Elasto Painters–2nd
Bye	Wildcard phase	Bye
Bye	Quarterfinals	Bye
Def. Burger King Whoppers, 4–2	Semifinals	Def. Rain or Shine Elasto Painters, 4–2

== Series summary ==
Team	Game 1	Game 2	Game 3	Game 4	Game 5	Game 6	Game 7	Wins
San Miguel	96	95	103	106	98	98	90	4
Barangay Ginebra	102	78	116	104	106	84	79	3
Venue	Araneta	Araneta	Araneta	Araneta	Araneta	Araneta	Araneta

=== Game 1 ===
C/S9

July 1
7:30 p.m.

Recap

San Miguel Beermen 96, Barangay Ginebra Kings 102
Scoring by quarter: 22–26, 19–27, 24–28, 31–21
Pts: Washington 19; Rebs: Freeman 12; Asts: Washington 3	Pts: Helterbrand 21; Rebs: Noel 8 Asts: Helterbrand 7
Barangay Ginebra leads series, 1–0

Araneta Coliseum, Quezon City
Referees: Cruz, Aldaba, Quilinguen

=== Game 2 ===
C/S9

July 3
7:00 p.m.

Recap

San Miguel Beermen 95, Barangay Ginebra Kings 78
Scoring by quarter: 20–22, 30–22, 21–20, 24–14
Pts: Freeman 23; Rebs: Freeman 17; Asts: Racela 5	Pts: Noel 20; Rebs: Noel, Reavis 8 Asts: Helterbrand 4
Series tied, 1–1

Araneta Coliseum, Quezon City
Referees: Montiel, Balao, Sambrano, N.

With just a few seconds before the game ended, and with a San Miguel win certain, San Miguel players Danny Ildefonso and Marc Pingris were involved with an altercation with a Ginebra fan. Both men were suspended for one game and were fined P30,000 and P10,000 respectively.

=== Game 3 ===
C/S9

July 5
6:00 p.m.

Recap

San Miguel Beermen 103, Barangay Ginebra Kings 116
Scoring by quarter: 29–21, 32–27, 17–28, 25–40
Pts: Freeman 25; Rebs: Freeman 19; Asts: Racela 5	Pts: Noel 32; Rebs: Noel 10; Asts: Noel 11
Barangay Ginebra leads series, 2–1

Araneta Coliseum, Quezon City
Attendance: 13,500
Referees: Aldaba, Herrera, Ferrer

The Kings, after falling behind by 12 points, outscored the Beermen by 11 points in the third quarter and another 15 points in the final quarter to have a come-from-behind victory to take the series lead. Noel had a triple double and had key plays during the decisive Ginebra run.

=== Game 4 ===
C/S9

July 8
7:00 p.m.

Recap

San Miguel Beermen 106, Barangay Ginebra Kings 104
Scoring by quarter: 24–26, 23–20, 24–27, 35–31
Pts: Freeman 23; Rebs: Freeman 21; Asts: Cortez, Villanueva 4	Pts: Helterbrand 22; Rebs: Noel 18; Asts: Helterbrand 6
Series tied, 2–2

Araneta Coliseum, Quezon City
Referees: Cruz, Ngo, Pascual

A close game all-throughout with as many as 18 deadlocks in between, Freeman converted a three-point play to increase San Miguel's lead to five; SMB led by as much as 8 in the final two minutes when Ginebra had another run. Eric Menk and Chico Lanete scored to cut the lead to two. Noel tied the ballgame after shooting two free throws off a foul from San Miguel, but Freeman scored on a put-back off Mike Cortez's miss. With less than 30 seconds left, Freeman fouled Noel beyond the three-point line on the act of shooting; Noel missed all of this free-throws, and San Miguel hung on to tie the series 2–2.

=== Game 5 ===
C/S9

July 13
7:00 p.m.

Recap

San Miguel Beermen 98, Barangay Ginebra Kings 106
Scoring by quarter: 18–23, 24–33, 26–15, 30–35
Pts: Cortez 23; Rebs: Freeman 10; Asts: Cortez 5	Pts: Noel 29; Rebs: Noel 11; Asts: Noel, Helterbrand 4
Barangay Ginebra leads series, 3–2

Araneta Coliseum, Quezon City
Attendance: 12,000
Referees: Herrera, Ferrer, Mangibin R.

The fifth game of the series was rescheduled to July 13 since the Araneta Coliseum was not available due to a WWE event on July 10 and a UAAP doubleheader on July 12.

=== Game 6 ===
C/S9

July 15
7:00 p.m.

Recap

San Miguel Beermen 98, Barangay Ginebra Kings 84
Scoring by quarter: 17–19, 27–15, 24–27, 30–23
Pts: Freeman 24; Rebs: Freeman 12; Asts: Freeman, Cortez 4	Pts: Noel 16; Rebs: Noel 11; Asts: Noel 7
Series tied, 3–3

Araneta Coliseum, Quezon City
Attendance: 16,039
Referees: Aldaba, Quilinguen, Sambrano N.

=== Game 7 ===
C/S9

July 17
7:00 p.m.

Recap

San Miguel Beermen 90, Barangay Ginebra Kings 79
Scoring by quarter: 25–15, 20–22, 25–23, 20–19
Pts: Freeman 29; Rebs: Freeman 18; Asts: Villanueva 7	Pts: Helterbrand 25; Rebs: Noel 15; Asts: Helterbrand 7
San Miguel wins series, 4–3

Araneta Coliseum, Quezon City
Attendance: 20,541
Referees: Aldaba, Herrera, Ferrer

== Rosters ==
San Miguel Beermen roster
Players
Coaches

Pos.	#	POB	Name	Height	Weight	DOB (YYYY–MM–DD)	From
PG	1	(United States)	Mike Cortez	5 ft 11 in (1.80 m)	170 lb (77 kg)		De La Salle
PG	3	(Philippines)	Jonas Villanueva	6 ft 0 in (1.83 m)	178 lb (81 kg)		Far Eastern
C	4	(United States)	Dorian Peña	6 ft 7 in (2.01 m)	235 lb (107 kg)		Coppin State
G	5	(Philippines)	Bonbon Custodio	5 ft 11 in (1.80 m)	190 lb (86 kg)		UE
SG	7	(Philippines)	Dondon Hontiveros	6 ft 2 in (1.88 m)	175 lb (79 kg)		Cebu
PF	10	(Philippines)	Danny Ildefonso	6 ft 6 in (1.98 m)	210 lb (95 kg)		National-U
G/F	15	(Philippines)	Wesley Gonzales	6 ft 4 in (1.93 m)	180 lb (82 kg)		Ateneo
F	16	(Philippines)	Marc Pingris	6 ft 6 in (1.98 m)	200 lb (91 kg)		PSBA
PG	17	(Philippines)	Olsen Racela (C)	5 ft 10 in (1.78 m)	165 lb (75 kg)		Ateneo
G/F	18	(Philippines)	Lordy Tugade	6 ft 3 in (1.91 m)	185 lb (84 kg)		National-U
C	21	(Philippines)	Samigue Eman	6 ft 9 in (2.06 m)	239 lb (108 kg)		Mindanao
SF	23	(Philippines)	Jay Washington	6 ft 7 in (2.01 m)	220 lb (100 kg)		Eckerd
SF	25	(United States)	Gabriel Freeman (I)	6 ft 6 in (1.98 m)	220 lb (100 kg)		Mesa CC
PG	27	(Philippines)	Froilan Baguion	5 ft 8 in (1.73 m)	150 lb (68 kg)		National-U
C	34	(Australia)	Mick Pennisi	6 ft 9 in (2.06 m)	235 lb (107 kg)		Eastern Michigan
PF	41	(Philippines)	Ken Bono	6 ft 5 in (1.96 m)	230 lb (104 kg)		Adamson
SF	42	(Philippines)	Danny Seigle (injured)	6 ft 7 in (2.01 m)	205 lb (93 kg)		Wagner
SG	88	(Philippines)	Chris Calaguio	6 ft 0 in (1.83 m)	185 lb (84 kg)		Letran

Head coach

- (Philippines) Siot Tanquingcen (UST)

Assistant coach(es)

- (Philippines) Gee Abanilla (De La Salle)
- (Philippines) Pido Jarencio (UST)
- (Philippines) Freddie Abuda (Cebu)
- (Philippines) Biboy Ravanes (Cebu)

Legend

- (C) Team captain
- (CI) Commissioner's Cup Import
- (GI) Governors' Cup Import
- (EI) EASL Import
- (DP) Unsigned draft pick
- (FA) Free agent
- (IN) Inactive
- (S) Suspended
- (R) Rookie
- (I) Import
- Injured

Barangay Ginebra Kings roster
Players
Coaches

Pos.	#	POB	Name	Height	Weight	DOB (YYYY–MM–DD)	From
PG	1	(Philippines)	Chico Lanete	6 ft 0 in (1.83 m)	180 lb (82 kg)		Lyceum
C	2	(Philippines)	Billy Mamaril	6 ft 6 in (1.98 m)	220 lb (100 kg)		Bakersfield
SG	3	(Philippines)	Cyrus Baguio	6 ft 2 in (1.88 m)	180 lb (82 kg)		UST
C	4	(United States)	Rafi Reavis	6 ft 8 in (2.03 m)	210 lb (95 kg)		Coppin State
PG	5	(Philippines)	Macky Escalona	5 ft 11 in (1.80 m)	180 lb (82 kg)		Ateneo
SF	9	(Philippines)	JC Intal	6 ft 4 in (1.93 m)	185 lb (84 kg)		Ateneo
SG	10	(Philippines)	Junthy Valenzuela (injured)	6 ft 2 in (1.88 m)	185 lb (84 kg)		SCSIT
PG	13	(Philippines)	Jayjay Helterbrand	5 ft 11 in (1.80 m)	170 lb (77 kg)		Kentucky State
PG	16	(Philippines)	Paul Artadi	5 ft 9 in (1.75 m)	150 lb (68 kg)		UE
PF	18	(Philippines)	Doug Kramer	6 ft 5 in (1.96 m)	210 lb (95 kg)		Ateneo
PG	22	(United States)	Chris Pacana	6 ft 1 in (1.85 m)	200 lb (91 kg)		Saint Francis of Assisi
SF	27	(United States)	Willy Wilson	6 ft 3 in (1.91 m)	215 lb (98 kg)		De La Salle
C	30	(United States)	Eric Menk (C)	6 ft 6 in (1.98 m)	220 lb (100 kg)		Lake Superior State
F	34	(United States)	David Noel (I)	6 ft 5 in (1.96 m)	220 lb (100 kg)		North Carolina
SG	47	(Philippines)	Mark Caguioa (injured)	6 ft 1 in (1.85 m)	185 lb (84 kg)		Glendale CC (CA)
SG	71	(Philippines)	Ronald Tubid	6 ft 1 in (1.85 m)	175 lb (79 kg)		UE
SG	80	(Philippines)	Sunday Salvacion	6 ft 3 in (1.91 m)	190 lb (86 kg)		St. Benilde
C	98	(Philippines)	Homer Se	6 ft 6 in (1.98 m)	220 lb (100 kg)		San Sebastian

Head coach

- (Philippines) Jong Uichico (De La Salle)

Assistant coach(es)

- (Philippines) Art dela Cruz (San Sebastian)
- (Philippines) Juno Sauler (De La Salle)
- (Philippines) Allan Caidic (UE)

Legend

- (C) Team captain
- (CI) Commissioner's Cup Import
- (GI) Governors' Cup Import
- (EI) EASL Import
- (DP) Unsigned draft pick
- (FA) Free agent
- (IN) Inactive
- (S) Suspended
- (R) Rookie
- (I) Import
- Injured

== Broadcast notes ==
The finals is the second championship series of The PBA on C/S.

Game	Play-by-play	Analyst	Courtside reporters
Game 1	Mico Halili	Andy Jao	Dominic Uy & Lia Cruz
Game 2	Vitto Lazatin	Quinito Henson	Magoo Marjon & Mica Abesamis
Game 3	Richard del Rosario	Norman Black	Chiqui Reyes & Cesca Litton
Game 4	Jude Turcuato	Jason Webb	Dominic Uy & Marga Vargas
Game 5	Sev Sarmienta	Quinito Henson	Patricia Bermudez-Hizon & Mica Abesamis
Game 6	Sev Sarmienta	Andy Jao	Magoo Marjon & Cesca Litton
Game 7	Mico Halili	Jason Webb	Magoo Marjon & Lia Cruz
