= Bogs Adornado PBA Comeback Player of the Year award =

The Bogs Adornado Philippine Basketball Association (PBA) Comeback Player of the Year is an annual Philippine Basketball Association (PBA) award given from 1993 PBA season up to 2016–17 PBA season, and from 2021 PBA season up to present. The winner receives the Bogs Adornado Trophy, which is named since 2010 in honor of William "Bogs" Adornado, a multiple time PBA most valuable player awardee who won his third MVP trophy in 1981 coming from a career-threatening knee injury in 1976 that forced him on the sidelines for two years. Unlike the traditional player awards, which is given by the league, this citation is awarded by the PBA Press Corps.

Since its inception, the award has been given to 21 individuals. Brandon Ganuelas-Rosser of TNT Tropang 5G will be honored by the PBA Press Corps (PBAPC) as the winner of the Bogs Adornado Comeback Player of the Year award.

== Winners ==
^	Denotes player who is still active in the PBA
*	Inducted into the PBA Hall of Fame
Player (X)	Denotes the number of times the player has received the award
Team (X)	Denotes the number of times a player from this team has won

Season	Player	Position	Country of birth	Team	Ref.
1993	Paul Alvarez	Shooting guard / Small forward	Philippines	Sta. Lucia Realtors	
1995	Yoyoy Villamin	Center / Power forward	Philippines	Sunkist Orange Juicers	
1996	Richie Ticzon	Point guard	Philippines	Formula Shell Zoom Masters	
1997	Paul Alvarez (2)	Shooting guard / Small forward	Philippines	San Miguel Beermen	
1998	Glenn Capacio	Shooting guard / Small forward	Philippines	Mobiline Phone Pals	
1999	Benjie Paras*	Center	Philippines	Shell Velocity (2)	
2000	Ato Agustin	Shooting guard / Point guard	Philippines	Batang Red Bull Energizers	
2004–05	Jayjay Helterbrand	Point guard / Shooting guard	Philippines	Barangay Ginebra Kings	
2005–06	Danny Seigle	Power forward / Small forward	United States	San Miguel Beermen (2)	
2006–07	Gary David	Shooting guard	Philippines	Air21 Express	
2007–08	Mike Hrabak	Power forward / Center	United States	Red Bull Barako (2)	
2008–09	Mike Cortez	Point guard / Shooting guard	Philippines	San Miguel Beermen (3)	
2009–10	Kelly Williams^	Power forward	United States	Talk 'N Text Tropang Texters (2)	
2010–11	Danny Ildefonso	Power forward / Center	Philippines	Petron Blaze Boosters (4)	
2011–12	Mark Caguioa	Shooting guard	Philippines	Barangay Ginebra Kings (2)	
2012–13	Marcio Lassiter^	Small forward / Shooting guard	United States	Petron Blaze Boosters (5)	
2013–14	Asi Taulava	Center	Tonga	Air21 Express	
2014–15	Alex Cabagnot	Point guard / Shooting guard	Philippines	San Miguel Beermen (6)	
2015–16	Paul Lee^	Shooting guard / Point guard	Philippines	Rain or Shine Elasto Painters	
2016–17	Kelly Williams^ (2)	Power forward	United States	TNT KaTropa (3)	
2021	June Mar Fajardo^	Center	Philippines	San Miguel Beermen (7)	
2022–23	Roi Sumang^	Point guard	Philippines	NorthPort Batang Pier	
2023–24	Ian Sangalang^	Center / Power forward	Philippines	Magnolia Chicken Timplados Hotshots	
2023–24	LA Tenorio^	Point guard	Philippines	Barangay Ginebra San Miguel (3)	
2024–25	Brandon Ganuelas-Rosser^	Center / Power forward	United States	TNT Tropang 5G (4)	
