= 2008 PBA Fiesta Conference =

Philippine basketball tournament

- Duration: March 29 – August 20, 2008
- TV partner(s): ABC/TV5 (Local); The Filipino Channel (International)

Finals
- Champions: Barangay Ginebra Kings
- Runners-up: Air21 Express

Awards
- Best Player: Jayjay Helterbrand (Barangay Ginebra Kings)
- Best Import: Chris Alexander (Barangay Ginebra Kings)
- Finals MVP: Eric Menk and Ronald Tubid (Barangay Ginebra Kings)

PBA Fiesta Conference chronology
- < 2007 2009 >

PBA conference chronology
- < 2007–08 Philippine 2008–09 Philippine >

The 2008 Philippine Basketball Association (PBA) Fiesta Conference, also known as the 2008 Smart PBA Fiesta Conference for sponsorship reasons, was the last conference of the 2007-08 PBA season. The tournament began on March 29 with a game between the Coca-Cola Tigers and the Talk 'N Text Phone Pals at Panabo, Davao del Norte. Opening ceremonies were held the day after at the Araneta Coliseum.

All ten teams are permitted to acquire one non-Filipino (the "import") of unlimited height as reinforcement. Furthermore, the two worst performers in the elimination round of the previous conference (the Coca-Cola Tigers and the Welcoat Dragons), will also be able to acquire another import but with a height limit of 6 ft 1 in (1.85 m).

== Tournament format ==
- Double round eliminations. Worst team would be eliminated.
- Sixth- to ninth-best teams figure in the one-game wildcard playoffs.
  - Sixth seed vs. Ninth seed
  - Seventh seed vs. Eighth seed
  - Winners will figure in a playoff to advance to the quarterfinals.
- Third- to fifth-best teams, and the winner of the wildcards advance to the best-of-three quarterfinals.
  - Third seed vs. winner of wildcards.
  - Fourth seed vs. fifth seed.
- The two best teams and the winners of the quarterfinals advance to the best-of-seven semifinals.
  - First seed vs. winner of the third seed/wildcard winner quarterfinal series
  - Second seed vs. winner of the fourth seed/fifth seed quarterfinal series
- The winners of the semifinals advance to the best-of-seven Finals; the losers figure in a one-game third-place playoff.

== Elimination round ==
=== Team standings ===
Pos	Team	W	L	PCT	GB	Qualification
1	Air21 Express	12	6	.667	—	Advance to semifinals
2	Red Bull Barako	11	7	.611	1	Advance to semifinals
3	Barangay Ginebra Kings	10	8	.556 (Note: Head-to-head differential: Barangay Ginebra +14, Coca-Cola +4, Magnolia −18)	2	Advance to quarterfinals
4	Coca-Cola Tigers	10	8	.556	2	Advance to quarterfinals
5	Magnolia Beverage Masters	10	8	.556	2	Advance to quarterfinals
6	Alaska Aces	9	9	.500 (Note: Head-to-head record: Alaska 1–1 Talk 'N Text (Alaska +9))	3	Advance to wildcard round
7	Talk 'N Text Phone Pals	9	9	.500	3	Advance to wildcard round
8	Purefoods Tender Juicy Giants	8	10	.444	4	Advance to wildcard round
9	Sta. Lucia Realtors	7	11	.389	5	Advance to wildcard round
10	Welcoat Dragons	4	14	.222	8	

=== Schedule ===
	Round 1									Round 2								
Team ╲ Game	1	2	3	4	5	6	7	8	9	10	11	12	13	14	15	16	17	18
Air21	WEL	RBB	PF	Coke	TNT	ALA	BGK	SLR	Coke	MBM	BGK	RBB	SLR	ALA	TNT	WEL	MBM	PF
Alaska	SLR	BGK	MBM	WEL	RBB	A21	TNT	PF	Coke	RBB	TNT	PF	A21	WEL	SLR	Coke	MBM	BGK
Barangay Ginebra	RBB	ALA	SLR	Coke	MBM	PF	A21	TNT	WEL	A21	MBM	RBB	SLR	PF	Coke	TNT	WEL	ALA
Coca-Cola	TNT	PF	WEL	A21	BGK	SLR	RBB	MBM	ALA	A21	RBB	WEL	PF	TNT	BGK	MBM	ALA	SLR
Magnolia	PF	SLR	ALA	TNT	BGK	WEL	RBB	Coke	PF	A21	BGK	TNT	WEL	RBB	SLR	Coke	A21	ALA
Purefoods	MBM	Coke	A21	RBB	WEL	BGK	ALA	MBM	TNT	SLR	ALA	Coke	WEL	BGK	RBB	TNT	SLR	A21
Red Bull	BGK	A21	TNT	PF	ALA	Coke	MBM	SLR	WEL	ALA	Coke	A21	BGK	MBM	PF	WEL	TNT	SLR
Sta. Lucia	ALA	MBM	BGK	TNT	Coke	WEL	RBB	A21	TNT	WEL	PF	A21	BGK	MBM	ALA	PF	Coke	RBB
Talk 'N Text	Coke	WEL	RBB	MBM	SLR	A21	ALA	WEL	BGK	SLR	PF	ALA	MBM	Coke	A21	PF	BGK	RBB
Welcoat	A21	TNT	Coke	ALA	PF	MBM	SLR	TNT	RBB	BGK	SLR	Coke	MBM	PF	ALA	A21	RBB	BGK

= Win; = OT win; = Loss; = OT loss

== Bracket ==
Wildcard phase (Single elimination)
6	Alaska	85
9	Sta. Lucia	99
7	Talk 'N Text	98
8	Purefoods	83

Wildcard phase (Single elimination)
9	Sta. Lucia	111
7	Talk 'N Text	96

Quarterfinals (Best-of-3)
3	Brgy. Ginebra	2
9	Sta. Lucia	0
4	Coca-Cola	1
5	Magnolia	2

Semifinals (Best-of-7)
3	Brgy. Ginebra	4
2	Red Bull	0
1	Air21	4
5	Magnolia	2

Finals (Best-of-7)
3	Brgy. Ginebra	4
1	Air21	3
Third place
2	Red Bull	102
5	Magnolia	90

== Wildcard phase ==
=== First round ===
ABC

July 9

Alaska Aces 86, Sta. Lucia Realtors 99

Ynares Center, Antipolo

ABC

July 9

Talk 'N Text Phone Pals 98, Purefoods Tender Juicy Giants 83

Ynares Center, Antipolo

=== Second round ===
ABC

July 11

Talk 'N Text Phone Pals 96, Sta. Lucia Realtors 111

Ynares Center, Antipolo

== Quarterfinals ==
=== (3) Barangay Ginebra vs. (9) Sta. Lucia ===
ABC

July 13

Barangay Ginebra Kings 92, Sta. Lucia Realtors 90

Cuneta Astrodome, Pasay

ABC

July 16

Barangay Ginebra Kings 113, Sta. Lucia Realtors 85
Barangay Ginebra wins series, 2–0

Ynares Center, Antipolo

=== (4) Coca-Cola vs. (5) Magnolia ===
ABC

July 13

Coca-Cola Tigers 96, Magnolia Beverage Masters 108

Cuneta Astrodome, Pasay

ABC

July 16

Coca-Cola Tigers 91, Magnolia Beverage Masters 90

Ynares Center, Antipolo

ABC

July 18

Coca-Cola Tigers 60, Magnolia Beverage Masters 78
Magnolia wins series, 2–1

Ynares Center, Antipolo

== Semifinals ==
=== (1) Air21 vs. (5) Magnolia ===
ABC

July 20

Air21 Express 87, Magnolia Beverage Masters 113

Cuneta Astrodome, Pasay

ABC

July 23

Air21 Express 103, Magnolia Beverage Masters 102

Araneta Coliseum, Quezon City

ABC

July 25

Air21 Express 82, Magnolia Beverage Masters 78

Ynares Center, Antipolo

ABC

July 27

Air21 Express 102, Magnolia Beverage Masters 104

Araneta Coliseum, Quezon City

ABC

July 30

Air21 Express 82, Magnolia Beverage Masters 72

Araneta Coliseum, Quezon City

ABC

August 1

Air21 Express 99, Magnolia Beverage Masters 91
Air21 wins series, 4–2

Cuneta Astrodome, Pasay

=== (2) Red Bull vs. (3) Barangay Ginebra ===
ABC

July 20

Red Bull Barako 82, Barangay Ginebra Kings 108

Cuneta Astrodome, Pasay

ABC

July 23

Red Bull Barako 104, Barangay Ginebra Kings 111

Araneta Coliseum, Quezon City

ABC

July 25

Red Bull Barako 91, Barangay Ginebra Kings 94

Ynares Center, Antipolo

ABC

July 27

Red Bull Barako 97, Barangay Ginebra Kings 101 (OT)
Barangay Ginebra wins series, 4–0

Araneta Coliseum, Quezon City

== Third place playoff ==
ABC

August 6

Red Bull Barako 102, Magnolia Beverage Masters 90
Scoring by quarter: 28-22, 15-26, 27-37, 20-17

Araneta Coliseum, Quezon City

== Finals ==
ABC

August 6
7:20 p.m.

boxscore

Air21 Express 96, Barangay Ginebra Kings 105

Araneta Coliseum, Quezon City
Attendance: 16,028
Referees: Aldaba, Ting, Maurillo

ABC

August 8
7:20 p.m.

boxscore

Air21 Express 124, Barangay Ginebra Kings 90

Ynares Center, Antipolo
Referees: Montiel, Ferrer, Pascual

TV5

August 10
6:30 p.m.

boxscore

Air21 Express 97, Barangay Ginebra Kings 87

Araneta Coliseum, Quezon City
Attendance: 15,142

TV5

August 13
7:20 p.m.

boxscore

Air21 Express 77, Barangay Ginebra Kings 90

Araneta Coliseum, Quezon City
Referees: Cruz, Aldaba, Quilinguen

TV5

August 15
7:20 p.m.

boxscore

Air21 Express 76, Barangay Ginebra Kings 73

Cuneta Astrodome, Pasay
Referees: Cruz, Calungcaguin, Guevarra

TV5

August 17
6:30 p.m.

boxscore

Air21 Express 75, Barangay Ginebra Kings 80

Araneta Coliseum, Quezon City
Attendance: 18,043

TV5

August 20
7:20 p.m.

boxscore

Air21 Express 84, Barangay Ginebra Kings 97
Barangay Ginebra wins series, 4–3

Araneta Coliseum, Quezon City
Attendance: 22,902

== Awards ==
- Finals Most Valuable Player: Ronald Tubid and Eric Menk (Barangay Ginebra)
- Best Player of the Conference: Jayjay Helterbrand (Barangay Ginebra)
- Best Import of the Conference: Chris Alexander (Barangay Ginebra)
- Players of the Week:
  - March 29-April 6: Kelly Williams (Sta. Lucia)
  - April 7–13: Danny Seigle (Magnolia)
  - April 14–20: Cyrus Baguio (Red Bull)
  - April 22-May 4: Mark Cardona (Talk 'N Text)
  - May 5–11: Asi Taulava (Coca-Cola) & Rob Wainwright (Welcoat)
  - May 12–18: Willie Miller (Alaska)
  - May 19–25: Mark Caguioa (Barangay Ginebra)
  - May 26-June 1: Gary David (Air21)
  - June 2–8: Jayjay Helterbrand (Barangay Ginebra)
  - June 9–15: Jayjay Helterbrand (Barangay Ginebra)
  - June 16–22: Lordy Tugade (Magnolia) & Ren-Ren Ritualo (Talk 'N Text)
  - June 23–29: Jayjay Helterbrand (Barangay Ginebra)
  - June 30–July 6: Gary David (Air21) & Mark Caguioa (Barangay Ginebra)
  - July 7–July 13: Joseph Yeo (Sta. Lucia)
  - July 14–July 20: none
  - July 21–July 27: Mark Caguioa (Barangay Ginebra)
  - July 28–August 3: Gary David (Air21)

== Imports ==
The following is the list of imports, which had played for their respective teams at least once, with the returning imports in italics. Highlighted are the imports who stayed with their respective teams for the whole conference.

#	Name	Team	Debuted
1	(United States) Calvin Cage	Coca-Cola Tigers	March 29 vs. Talk 'N Text
2	(United States) Jason Dixon	Coca-Cola Tigers	March 29 vs. Talk 'N Text
3	(United States) Aaron McGhee	Talk 'N Text Phone Pals	March 29 vs. Coca-Cola
4	(United States) Steve Thomas	Air21 Express	March 30 vs. Welcoat
5	(United States) Jason Keep	Welcoat Dragons	March 30 vs. Air21
6	(United States) Cory Santee	Welcoat Dragons	March 30 vs. Air21
7	(Mexico) Adam Parada	Red Bull Barako	March 30 vs. Brgy. Ginebra
8	(United States) Rahshon Turner	Barangay Ginebra Kings	March 30 vs. Red Bull
9	(United States) Wesley Wilson	Sta. Lucia Realtors	April 2 vs. Alaska
10	(United States) Randy Holcomb	Alaska Aces	April 2 vs. Sta. Lucia
11	(United States) Darius Rice	Purefoods Tender Juicy Giants	April 2 vs. Magnolia
12	(United States) Jameel Watkins	Magnolia Beverage Masters	April 2 vs. Purefoods
13	(United States) Marquis Gainous	Welcoat Dragons	April 9 vs. Coca-Cola
14	(United States) Ernest Brown	Barangay Ginebra Kings	April 12 vs. Sta. Lucia
15	(United States) George Gervin, Jr.	Coca-Cola Tigers	April 13 vs. Air21
16	(United States) Chris Alexander	Barangay Ginebra Kings	May 2 vs. Purefoods
17	(Morocco) Reda Rhalimi	Purefoods Tender Juicy Giants	May 10 vs. Alaska
18	(United States) Donald Copeland	Coca-Cola Tigers	May 23 vs. Red Bull
19	(United States) Jamar Brown	Sta. Lucia Realtors	June 1 vs. Air21
20	(United States) Lee Benson, Jr.	Sta. Lucia Realtors	June 13 vs. Magnolia
21	(United States) Amal McCaskill	Magnolia Beverage Masters	June 13 vs. Sta. Lucia
22	(United States) Terrence Leather	Talk 'N Text Phone Pals	June 13 vs. Air21
23	(United States) Alex Compton	Welcoat Dragons	June 18 vs. Air21
24	(United States) Brandon Dean	Coca-Cola Tigers	July 13 vs. Magnolia
