= Rashad Bell =

American basketball player

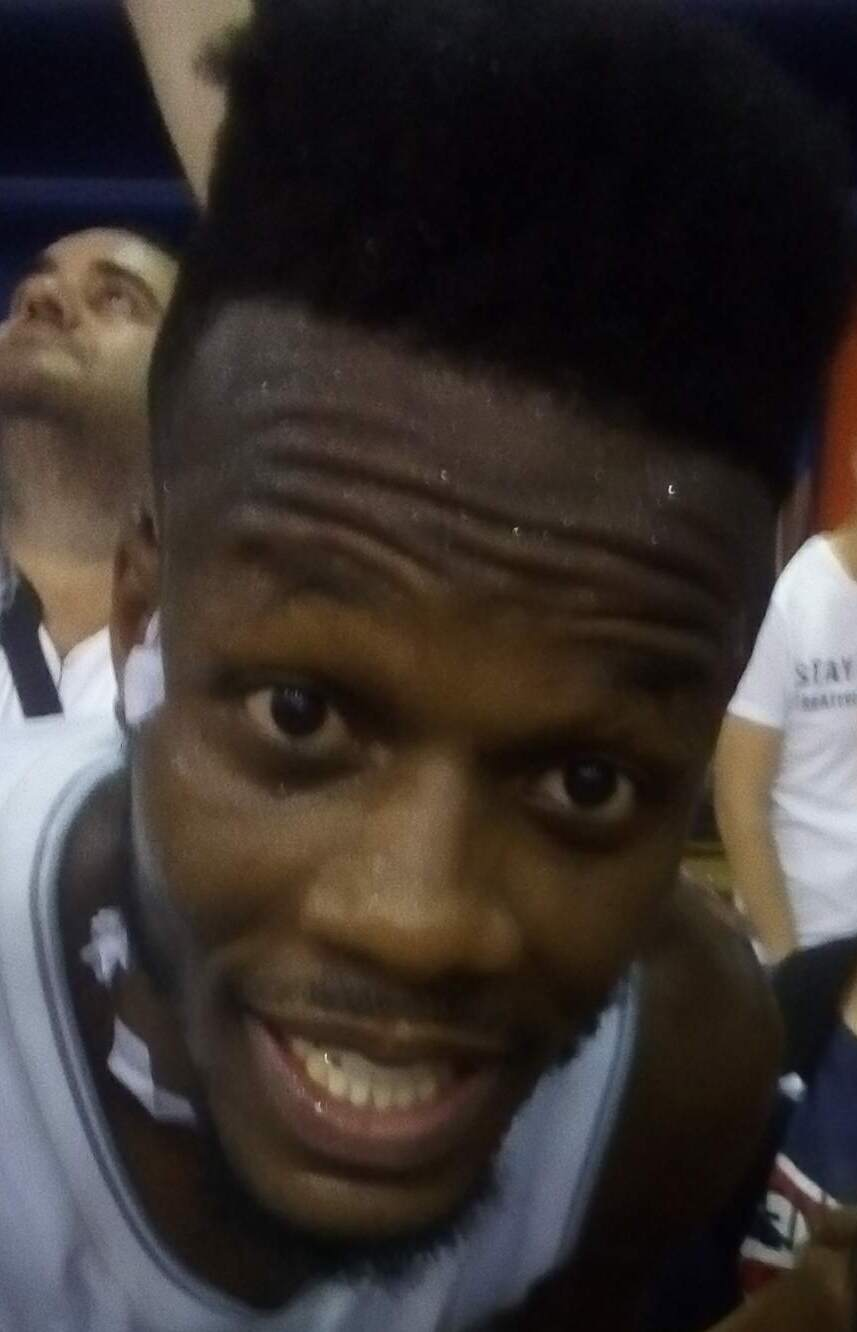
- Bell in 2018

Personal information
- Born: September 23, 1982 (age 44) New York City, New York, U.S.
- Listed height: 6 ft 8 in (2.03 m)
- Listed weight: 212 lb (96 kg)

Career information
- High school: St. Francis Prep (Queens, New York)
- College: Boston University (2001–2005)
- NBA draft: 2005: undrafted
- Playing career: 2005–2018
- Position: Power forward / small forward

Career history
- 2005–2006: Basket Porvo
- 2006: Long Island PrimeTime
- 2006–2007: ZTE KK
- 2007: Caridouros de Fajardo
- 2007: Powerade Tigers
- 2007–2008: Basket Rimini Crabs
- 2008–2009: Alba Fehérvár
- 2009: Tropang Texters
- 2009: Anyang KGC
- 2009–2010: Incheon Electroland Elephants
- 2010: Powerade Tigers
- 2010–2012: BC Körmend
- 2012: Basket Guerreros de Bogota
- 2012–2013: Szolnoki Olaj
- 2013–2014: Duhok
- 2014–2015: Gezira
- 2015: Reales de La Vega
- 2015: La Cancha de Moca
- 2015: Al Sharjaah
- 2016: Aguada
- 2016: Sagesse Beirut
- 2016: El Jaish Doha
- 2016: Guaiqueriés de Margarita
- 2016–2017: Al Mina'a
- 2017–2018: Holargos
- 2018: Apollon Patras

Career highlights
- Greek A2 Playoff Champion (2018); Dubai Tournament Champion (2016) Iraqi League champion (2014)

Rashad Ernest Bell (born September 23, 1982) is an American former professional basketball player. He also holds a Hungarian passport.
