= 2006–07 PBA season =

32nd PBA season

- Duration: September 28, 2006 – July 20, 2007
- Teams: 10
- TV partner(s): Local: ABC; International: The Filipino Channel

2006 PBA Draft
- Top draft pick: Kelly Williams
- Picked by: Sta. Lucia Realtors
- Season MVP: Willie Miller (Alaska Aces)
- Philippine Cup champions: Barangay Ginebra Kings
- Philippine Cup runners-up: San Miguel Beermen
- Fiesta Conference champions: Alaska Aces
- Fiesta Conference runners-up: Talk 'N Text Phone Pals

Seasons
- ← 2005–06 2007–08 →

The 2006–07 PBA season was the 32nd season of the Philippine Basketball Association (PBA). The season started September 28 in Guam and began its formal opening on October 1 at the Araneta Coliseum, and ended on July 20. The league started the season with the All-Filipino Conference, now known as the PBA Philippine Cup while the PBA Fiesta Conference, an import laced tournament, ended the season.

Philippine Basketball League team Welcoat Paintmasters became the tenth member of the league after acquiring the franchise from the defunct Shell Turbo Chargers. The Welcoat franchise has been renamed Welcoat Dragons

== Opening ceremonies ==
The season began on October 1 with the Barangay Ginebra Kings defeating the expansion team Welcoat Dragons, 102–69 in the opener.

The muses for the participating teams are as follows:

Team	Muse
Air21 Express	Tanya Garcia
Alaska Aces	Gelli de Belen
Barangay Ginebra Kings	Angelica Panganiban
Coca-Cola Tigers	
Purefoods Chunkee Giants	26K girls
Red Bull Barako	Milena Krahvicova
San Miguel Beermen	Valerie Concepcion
Sta. Lucia Realtors	Precious Lara Quigaman
Talk 'N Text Phone Pals	Pauleen Luna
Welcoat Dragons	Bianca King

== 2006–07 Philippine Cup ==
=== Notable events ===
- On November 19, Red Bull's Enrico Villanueva and Coca-Cola's Joseph Yeo and Mike Gavino had an altercation at the Araneta Coliseum parking lot after the Tigers' loss to Red Bull. After a meeting at Commissioner Noli Eala's office, Yeo and Villanueva mended their ways. Gavino, Allan Salansang (of Coca-Cola) and Manny Ramos (of Red Bull) gave their testimonies. Villanueva and Yeo previously had an altercation at the Ateneo-La Salle Dream Game, in which Villanueva played for Ateneo while Yeo played for La Salle.
- On November 30, Red Bull coach Yeng Guiao and Talk 'N Text team manager Frankie Lim featured in a shouting match as Asi Taulava of Talk 'N Text and Carlo Sharma of Red Bull figured in an altercation, in a game held at Tacloban City. Guiao and Lim were later ejected at the playing court. Guiao and Lim were later suspended for two games.
- The PBA board approved the passing of the "Restricted Trading List (RTL)," a list of one, later two, players that can't be traded for, unless the replacement is also in the RTL. Qualifications for inclusion in the RTL include statistical points, salaries, longevity and marketability of a player. The RTL is designed to prevent one-sided trades, or trades that will favor only one team.
- San Miguel Corporation (SMC) sold all of its shares of Coca-Cola Bottlers Philippines to the Coca-Cola Company for US$590 million. The fate of the Coca-Cola Tigers is in doubt but rumors say that SMC will transfer the Tigers into different subsidiary.
- Air21 Express traded Yancy de Ocampo and Leo Avenido in exchange for Abby Santos, Mark Andaya and two first-round picks in 2009 and 2010 to the Talk 'N Text Phone Pals.

=== Elimination round ===
Pos	Team	W	L	PCT	GB	Qualification
1	Barangay Ginebra Kings	13	5	.722 (Note: Head-to-head differential: Barangay Ginebra +1, San Miguel −1)	—	Advance to semifinals
2	San Miguel Beermen	13	5	.722	—	Advance to semifinals
3	Red Bull Barako	11	7	.611	2	Advance to quarterfinals
4	Talk 'N Text Phone Pals	10	8	.556 (Note: Head-to-head differential: Talk 'N Text +4, Purefoods +3, Sta. Lucia −7; fifth-seed playoff: Purefoods 92–78 Sta. Lucia)	3	Advance to quarterfinals
5	Purefoods Chunkee Giants	10	8	.556	3	Advance to quarterfinals
6	Sta. Lucia Realtors	10	8	.556	3	Advance to wildcard round
7	Alaska Aces	8	10	.444	5	Advance to wildcard round
8	Air21 Express	7	11	.389	6	Advance to wildcard round
9	Coca-Cola Tigers	5	13	.278	8	Advance to wildcard round
10	Welcoat Dragons	3	15	.167	10	

Source: PBA.ph

=== Wildcard round ===
Overall standings
Pos	Team	W	L	PCT	GB	Qualification
6	Sta. Lucia Realtors	11	10	.524	—	Guaranteed quarterfinals berth playoff (Note: If a team won all wildcard round games and did not finish first, it will playoff with the team that finished first for the quarterfinals berth.)
7	Air21 Express	10	11	.476	1	Qualified to quarterfinals berth playoff
8	Alaska Aces	9	12	.429	2	
9	Coca-Cola Tigers	6	15	.286	5	

Source: PBA.ph
Notes:

Wildcard phase standings
Pos	Team	W	L	Qualification
6	Air21 Express	3	0	Qualified to quarterfinals berth playoff (Note: Quarterfinals berth playoff: Sta. Lucia 121–118 Air21 (OT))
7	Alaska Aces	1	2	
8	Coca-Cola Tigers	1	2	
9	Sta. Lucia Realtors	1	2	

Source: PBA.ph

=== Playoffs ===
Quarterfinals (Best-of-5)
4	Talk 'N Text	3
5	Purefoods	1
3	Red Bull	3
6	Sta. Lucia	1

Semifinals (Best-of-7)
1	Barangay Ginebra	4
4	Talk 'N Text	2
2	San Miguel	4
3	Red Bull	3

Finals (Best-of-7)
1	Barangay Ginebra	4
2	San Miguel	2
Third-place playoff
4	Talk 'N Text	124
3	Red Bull	111

==== Quarterfinals ====
Team 1	Series	Team 2	Game 1	Game 2	Game 3	Game 4	Game 5
(3) Red Bull Barako	3–1	(6) Sta. Lucia Realtors	89–96	100–98 (OT)	114–96	105–90	—
(4) Talk 'N Text Tropang Texters	3–2	(5) Purefoods Chunkee Giants	84–87	110–92	102–78	115–96	—

==== Semifinals ====
Team 1	Series	Team 2	Game 1	Game 2	Game 3	Game 4	Game 5	Game 6	Game 7
(1) Barangay Ginebra Kings	4–2	(4) Talk 'N Text Phone Pals	100–115	99–96	109–100	103–110	105–108	89–98	—
(2) San Miguel Beermen	4–3	(3) Red Bull Barako	99–83	84–103	88–74	84–97	82–94	78–87	—

==== Third place playoff ====
Team 1	Score	Team 2
(3) Red Bull Barako	111–67	(4) Talk 'N Text Phone Pals

==== Finals ====
Team 1	Series	Team 2	Game 1	Game 2	Game 3	Game 4	Game 5	Game 6	Game 7
(1) Barangay Ginebra Kings	4–2	(2) San Miguel Beermen	94–118	101–104	131–101	146–111	94–82	96–94	—

- Finals MVP: Jayjay Helterbrand (Brgy. Ginebra)
- Best Player of the Conference: Mark Caguioa (Brgy. Ginebra)

== 2007 Fiesta Conference ==
=== Notable events ===
- The Purefoods Chunkee Giants changed their nickname to the "Purefoods Tender Juicy Giants," a combination of the Chunkee Giants and TJ Hotdogs nicknames they've had.
- Twelve out of fifteen players who were selected to the national team were pulled out from their mother teams to begin their training for the upcoming SEABA Championship 2007, a qualifying tournament for the FIBA Asia Championship 2007. As a result, an apprenticeship draft was supposed to be held, but with players from the Philippine Basketball League and the Mindanao Visayas Basketball Association not taking part, the teams were advised to activate players from their respective injured reserve lists.
- The playoffs of the conference were supposed to be shortened for the national team but since the players themselves wouldn't participate in the conference, the semifinals was re-extended from a best-of-five series to a best-of-seven series.
- The Coca-Cola Tigers and Coca-Cola Bottlers Philippines were sold by the San Miguel Corporation to the Coca-Cola Company. The Atlanta-based company honored the existing contracts of the team, except for team manager Allan Caidic who voluntarily left the team.
- Former commissioner Jun Bernardino died as he suffered a heart attack; all teams were to wear black bands in the duration of the conference.
- The Sta. Lucia Realtors dealt Kenneth Duremdes, Alex Cabagnot and Ricky Calimag to the Coca-Cola Tigers in exchange for Dennis Miranda, Manny Ramos and Coca-Cola's second round draft pick next year.
- After negotiations at Ratchaburi, Thailand, Red Bull Barako traded Enrico Villanueva for Rommel Adducul of the San Miguel Beermen. Prior to this, Pennisi replaced Villanueva in Red Bull's restricted trade list in order for the trade to push through.
- The Purefoods Chunkee Giants then traded Don Camaso and a second-round pick in either the 2007 PBA Draft or the 2008 PBA Draft for Adducul. This was criticized by PBA insider Ronnie Nathanielsz saying the league was being used "as a business enterprise not to promote its products but to make money selling players" that would lessen the competitive balance between teams.

=== Elimination round ===
Pos	Team	W	L	PCT	GB	Qualification
1	Red Bull Barako	13	5	.722	—	Advance to semifinals
2	Alaska Aces	12	6	.667 (Note: Second-seed playoff: Alaska 103–95 Barangay Ginebra)	1	Advance to semifinals
3	Barangay Ginebra Kings	12	6	.667	1	Advance to quarterfinals
4	Talk 'N Text Phone Pals	11	7	.611	2	Advance to quarterfinals
5	Air21 Express	10	8	.556 (Note: Fifth-seed playoff: Air21 103–99 San Miguel)	3	Advance to quarterfinals
6	San Miguel Beermen	10	8	.556	3	Advance to wildcard round
7	Coca-Cola Tigers	7	11	.389	6	Advance to wildcard round
8	Purefoods Tender Juicy Giants	6	12	.333	7	Advance to wildcard round
9	Sta. Lucia Realtors	5	13	.278	8	Advance to wildcard round
10	Welcoat Dragons	4	14	.222	9	

Source: PBA.ph

=== Playoffs ===
Wildcard phase (Single elimination)
6	San Miguel	102
9	Sta. Lucia	85
7	Coca-Cola	100
8	Purefoods	97

Wildcard phase (Single elimination)
6	San Miguel	102
7	Coca-Cola	101

Quarterfinals (Best-of-3)
3	Brgy. Ginebra	1
6	San Miguel	2
4	Talk 'N Text	2
5	Air21	1

Semifinals (Best-of-7)
2	Alaska	4
6	San Miguel	2
1	Red Bull	2
4	Talk 'N Text	4

Finals (Best-of-7)
2	Alaska	4
4	Talk 'N Text	3
Third place
6	San Miguel	96
1	Red Bull	103

==== Wildcard phase ====
===== 1st round =====
Team 1	Score	Team 2
(6) San Miguel Beermen	102–85	(9) Sta. Lucia Realtors
(7) Coca-Cola Tigers	100–97	(8) Purefoods Tender Juicy Giants

===== 2nd round =====
Team 1	Score	Team 2
(6) San Miguel Beermen	102–101	(7) Coca-Cola Tigers

==== Quarterfinals ====
Team 1	Series	Team 2	Game 1	Game 2	Game 3
(3) Barangay Ginebra Kings	1–2	(6) San Miguel Beermen	113–87	89–111	114–117 (OT)
(4) Talk 'N Text Phone Pals	2–1	(5) Air21 Express	102–121	108–92	114–112

==== Semifinals ====
Team 1	Series	Team 2	Game 1	Game 2	Game 3	Game 4	Game 5	Game 6	Game 7
(1) Red Bull Barako	2–4	(4) Talk 'N Text Phone Pals	107–101	103–107	98–105	111–104	111–112	110–122	—
(2) Alaska Aces	4–2	(6) San Miguel Beermen	100–99	93–68	81–91	93–87	108–126	113–109 (2OT)	—

==== Third place playoff ====
Team 1	Score	Team 2
(1) Red Bull Barako	103–96	(6) San Miguel Beermen

==== Finals ====
Team 1	Series	Team 2	Game 1	Game 2	Game 3	Game 4	Game 5	Game 6	Game 7
(2) Alaska Aces	4–3	(4) Talk 'N Text Phone Pals	113–85	113–120	87–95	86–82	104–107	121–110	99–96

- Finals MVP: Willie Miller
- Best Player of the Conference: Mark Cardona (Talk 'N Text)
- Best Import of the Conference: Rossel Ellis (Alaska)

== 2007 All-Star Weekend ==
The 2007 PBA All-Star Weekend was held at San Fernando City, La Union and Baguio. The winners were:

- Obstacle Challenge: Willie Miller (Alaska Aces)
- Shooting Stars Challenge: Jayjay Helterbrand, Dominic Uy and San Fernando City councilor Panding Nince
- Trick Shot Challenge: Dennis Miranda (Sta. Lucia Realtors)
- Three-point Shootout: Dondon Hontiveros (San Miguel Beermen)
- Slam Dunk Competition: Niño Canaleta (Air21 Express)
- Legends Shootout: Active players - Willie Miller (Alaska Aces), Dondon Hontiveros (San Miguel Beermen), Gary David (Air21 Express)

=== Rookie–Sophomore Blitz Game ===
ABC

April 26

Rookies 122, Sophomores 107

Pacoy Ortega Gym, San Fernando, La Union

Arwind Santos named the game's most valuable player.

=== All-Star Game ===
ABC

April 29

South All-Stars 142, North All-Stars 145

University of Baguio Gym, Baguio

Jayjay Helterbrand and Willie Miller named the game's co-most valuable players.

== Manila Invitational ==
As part of the warmups for the upcoming FIBA Asia Championship 2007, the PBA invited four national teams taking part in the Asian Championships for the first PBA-Smart Manila Invitational Championships.

=== Preliminary round ===
Pos	Team	W	L	PF	PA	PD	Qualification
1	Lebanon	2	1	255	219	+36	Advance to Final
2	Philippines	2	1	254	239	+15	Advance to Final
3	China	2	1	246	245	+1	Proceed to third place playoff
4	Syria	0	3	233	285	−52	Proceed to third place playoff

Source: PBA.ph

July 12

Prelims

China	98–94	Syria

The Arena, San Juan City

July 12

Prelims

Philippines	88–83	Lebanon

The Arena, San Juan City

July 13

Prelims

Syria	60–95	Lebanon

Araneta Coliseum, Quezon City

July 13

Prelims

Philippines	74–77	China

Araneta Coliseum, Quezon City

July 14

Prelims

China	71–77	Lebanon

The Arena, San Juan City

July 14

Prelims

Philippines	92–79	Syria

The Arena, San Juan City

=== Third place playoff ===
July 15

3rd place

Syria	90–85	China

Araneta Coliseum, Quezon City

=== Final ===
July 15

Final

Lebanon	81–87	Philippines

Araneta Coliseum, Quezon City

=== Awards ===
- Most valuable player:
  - (Philippines) Jimmy Alapag
- All-tournament team:
  - (Philippines) Jimmy Alapag
  - (Syria) Michael Madanly
  - (Lebanon) Fadi El Khatib
  - (Philippines) Kelly Williams
  - (Lebanon) Joe Vogel

== Awards ==
- Most Valuable Player: Willie Miller (Alaska)
- Rookie of the Year: Kelly Williams (Sta. Lucia)
- First Mythical Team:
  - Gary David (Air21)
  - Willie Miller (Alaska)
  - Jay Washington (Talk 'N Text)
  - Kelly Williams (Sta. Lucia)
  - Dorian Peña (San Miguel)
- Second Mythical Team:
  - Wynne Arboleda (Air21)
  - Mark Cardona (Talk 'N Text)
  - Danny Ildefonso (San Miguel)
  - Arwind Santos (Air21)
  - Yancy de Ocampo (Talk 'N Text)
- All-Defensive Team:
  - Nelbert Omolon (Sta. Lucia)
  - Arwind Santos (Air21)
  - Harvey Carey (Talk 'N Text)
  - Wynne Arboleda (Air21)
  - Gary David (Air21)
- Most Improved Player: Gary David (Air21)
- Sportsmanship Award: Gary David (Air21)
- Mr. Energy: Ronald Tubid (Brgy. Ginebra)

=== Awards given by the PBA Press Corps ===
- Coach of the Year: Jong Uichico (Barangay Ginebra)
- Mr. Quality Minutes: Chris Calaguio (San Miguel)
- Comeback Player of the Year: Gary David (Air21)
- Referee of the Year: Mario Montiel
- All-Rookie Team
  - LA Tenorio (San Miguel)
  - Jireh Ibañes (Welcoat)
  - Jay-R Reyes (Welcoat)
  - Kelly Williams (Sta. Lucia)
  - Arwind Santos (Air21)

== Cumulative standings ==
=== Overall standings ===
Pos	Team	Pld	W	L	PCT	Best finish
1	Barangay Ginebra Kings	52	34	18	.654	Champions
2	Red Bull Barako	55	33	22	.600	Third place
3	Alaska Aces	53	30	23	.566	Champions
4	San Miguel Beermen	62	35	27	.565	Finalist
5	Talk 'N Text Phone Pals	63	36	27	.571	Finalist
6	Air21 Express	44	22	22	.500	Quarterfinalist
7	Purefoods Chunkee/Tender Juicy Giants	42	18	24	.429	Quarterfinalist
8	Sta. Lucia Realtors	46	18	28	.391	Quarterfinalist
9	Coca-Cola Tigers	41	14	27	.341	Wildcard phase
10	Welcoat Dragons	36	7	29	.194	Elimination round

=== Elimination rounds ===
Pos	Team	Pld	W	L	PCT
1	Barangay Ginebra Kings	36	25	11	.694
2	Red Bull Barako	36	24	12	.667
3	San Miguel Beermen	36	23	13	.639
4	Talk 'N Text Phone Pals	36	21	15	.583
5	Alaska Aces	36	20	16	.556
6	Air21 Express	36	17	19	.472
7	Purefoods Chunkee/Tender Juicy Giants	36	16	20	.444
8	Sta. Lucia Realtors	36	15	21	.417
9	Coca-Cola Tigers	36	12	24	.333
10	Welcoat Dragons	36	7	29	.194

=== Playoffs ===
Pos	Team	Pld	W	L
1	Talk 'N Text Phone Pals	27	15	12
2	San Miguel Beermen	26	12	14
3	Alaska Aces	17	10	7
4	Red Bull Barako	19	9	10
5	Barangay Ginebra Kings	16	9	7
6	Air21 Express	8	5	3
7	Sta. Lucia Realtors	10	3	7
8	Purefoods Chunkee/Tender Juicy Giants	6	2	4
9	Coca-Cola Tigers	5	2	3
10	Welcoat Dragons	0	0	0

== Eala's resignation ==
League commissioner Noli Eala resigned on August 8, 2007, after being disbarred by the Supreme Court on charges infidelity.
