= Jeff Varem =

Nigerian basketball player

Personal information
- Born: July 16, 1983 (age 43) Benue, Nigeria
- Listed height: 6 ft 6 in (1.98 m)
- Listed weight: 245 lb (111 kg)

Career information
- High school: Buffalo Traditional (Buffalo, New York)
- College: Vincennes (2001–2003); Washington State (2003–2005)
- NBA draft: 2005: undrafted
- Playing career: 2005–2011
- Position: Small forward / power forward

Career history
- 2005–2006: Élan Béarnais Pau-Orthez
- 2006–2007: Sioux Falls Skyforce
- 2007: Tulsa 66ers
- 2007: Coca-Cola Tigers
- 2007–2008: ASVEL
- 2009: Saba Mehr Tehran
- 2009: Barako Bull Energy Boosters
- 2009–2010: Saba Mehr Tehran
- 2010–2011: Anyang KGC

Career highlights
- PBA Import All-star (2009)

Ngutor Jeff Varem (born 16 July 1983) is a Nigerian former professional basketball player. Standing at 6 ft 6 in (1.98 m) and weighing 245 pounds, he played primarily as a small forward and power forward. He had a professional career that spanned leagues in the United States, France, the Philippines, and South Korea, and he represented the Nigeria national basketball team at several major international tournaments.

== Early life and college career ==
Born in Benue State, Nigeria, Varem relocated to the United States and attended Buffalo Traditional High School in Buffalo, New York.

He began his college basketball career at the junior college level with Vincennes University in Indiana, playing from 2001 to 2003. As a sophomore, he led the team with averages of 15.8 points, 8.8 rebounds, and 1.8 blocks per game, earning first-team All-Region XII and second-team NJCAA All-America honors.

Varem subsequently transferred to Washington State University (WSU) to play NCAA Division I basketball for the Cougars.During his senior season (2004–2005), he played a key role in the team's rotation, notably helping the Cougars secure an upset victory over No. 11 Arizona in Tucson, which snapped a 38-game losing streak to the Wildcats.

=== Professional career ===
After going undrafted in the 2005 NBA draft, Varem began his professional career overseas, signing with French club Élan Béarnais Pau-Orthez for the 2005–06 season. He gained immediate high-level European experience, competing in 30 games in the domestic LNB Pro A and making 14 appearances in the EuroLeague.

He returned to the United States for the 2006–07 season to play in the NBA Development League (now the G League), splitting his time between the Sioux Falls Skyforce and the Tulsa 66ers.

Varem then transitioned to Asian basketball, signing as an import player in the Philippine Basketball Association (PBA), where he featured for the Coca-Cola Tigers and later the Barako Bull Energy Boosters. He had a brief return to France, signing with ASVEL during the 2007–08 season and competing in the ULEB Cup. Varem's later career included a stint in the Korean Basketball League (KBL), where he played 25 games for Anyang KGC during the 2010–11 season.

=== National team career ===
Varem was a consistent presence for the Nigerian national basketball team, D'Tigers, across multiple levels. He first represented Nigeria at the youth level during the 1999 FIBA Under-19 World Championship, averaging 2.6 points and 1.5 rebounds per game.

With the senior team, Varem won a silver medal at the 2003 FIBA Africa Championship (AfroBasket). He also participated in the 2005 FIBA Africa Championship and was selected to the final roster for the 2006 FIBA World Championship in Japan, where he appeared in six games as Nigeria reached the Round of 16.
