= David Noel =

American basketball player and coach

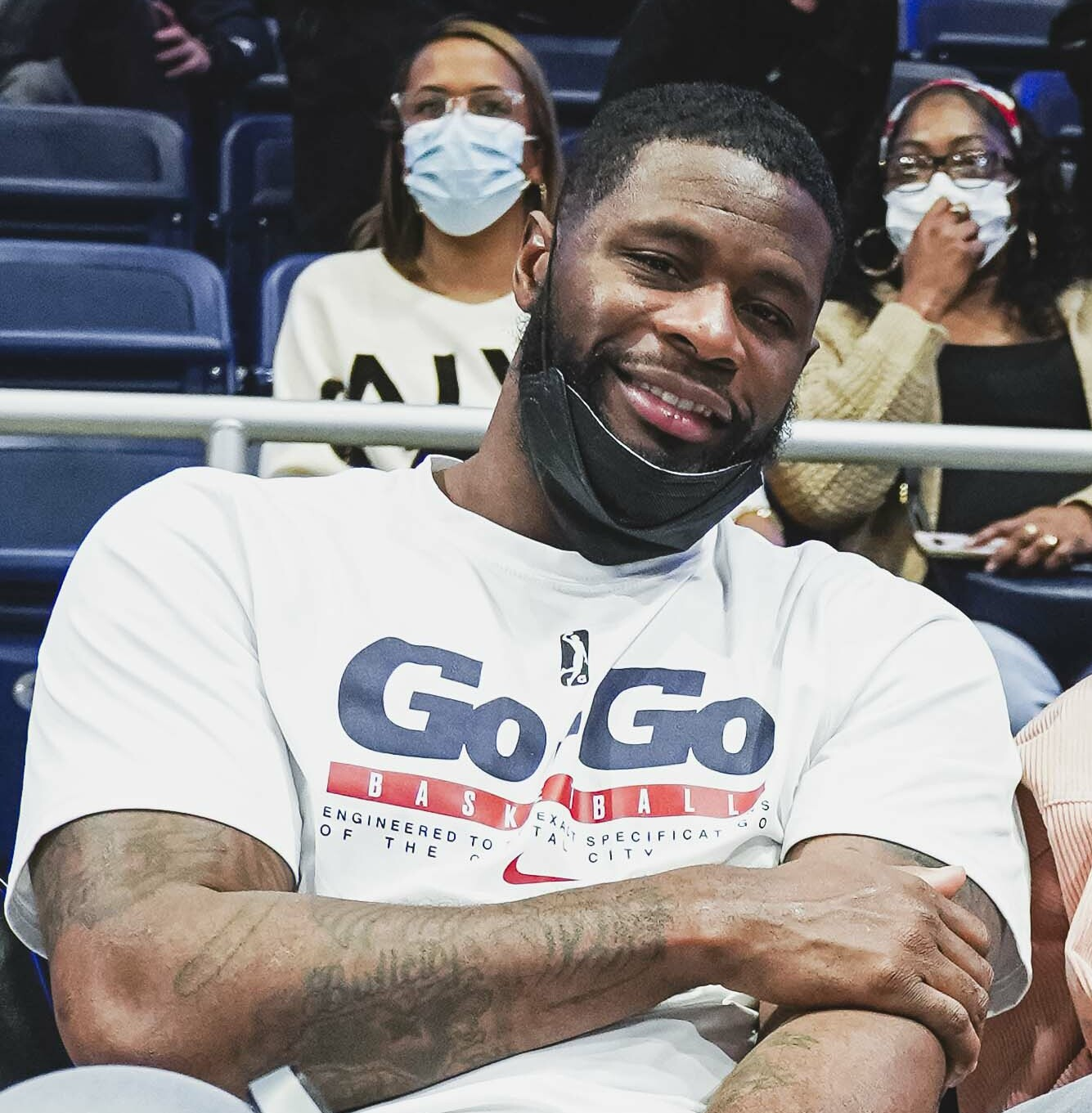
- Noel at men's World Cup Qualifying game in 2022

UNC Greensboro Spartans
- Title: Assistant coach
- Conference: Southern Conference

Personal information
- Born: February 27, 1984 (age 42) Durham, North Carolina, U.S.
- Listed height: 6 ft 6 in (1.98 m)
- Listed weight: 230 lb (104 kg)

Career information
- High school: Southern (Durham, North Carolina)
- College: North Carolina (2002–2006)
- NBA draft: 2006: 2nd round, 39th overall pick
- Drafted by: Milwaukee Bucks
- Playing career: 2006–2017
- Position: Small forward
- Number: 34
- Coaching career: 2017–present

Career history

Playing
- 2006–2007: Milwaukee Bucks
- 2008: Tulsa 66ers
- 2008: DKV Joventut
- 2008–2009: Albuquerque Thunderbirds
- 2009: Reno Bighorns
- 2009: Barangay Ginebra Kings
- 2009–2010: Chorale Roanne Basket
- 2010–2012: Paris-Levallois
- 2012–2013: BCM Gravelines
- 2013: Edymax SPU Nitra
- 2013–2015: Orléans Loiret Basket
- 2016–2017: Cholet

Coaching
- 2017–2019: Southern HS
- 2019–2023: Capital City Go-Go (assistant)
- 2023–2024: Motor City Cruise (assistant)
- 2024–2026: Greensboro Swarm (assistant)
- 2026–present: UNC Greensboro (assistant)

Career highlights
- PBA Slam Dunk champion (2009); PBA All-Star (2009); PBA All-Star Game MVP (2009); NCAA champion (2005); Second-team All-ACC (2006)
- Stats at NBA.com
- Stats at Basketball Reference

David Anthony Noel III (born February 27, 1984) is an American former professional basketball player and current college basketball coach, currently an assistant for the UNC Greensboro Spartans of the Southern Conference. A graduate of the University of North Carolina, Noel was drafted by the Milwaukee Bucks in the second round of the 2006 NBA draft with their lone pick, 39th overall.

Noel averaged 2.7 points, 1.8 rebounds, and 1.0 assists per game during his sole season with the Bucks. On January 20, 2008, David Noel joined the Tulsa 66ers of the NBDL. On November 7, 2008, he was selected with the 14th pick in the first round of the 2008 NBA Development League Draft by the Albuquerque Thunderbirds.

On March 2, 2009, Noel was traded to the Reno Bighorns for Antonio Meeking.

Later that year, Noel was chosen by the Barangay Ginebra Kings team of the Philippine Basketball Association (PBA) to be their import.

Noel played with the French team Chorale Roanne Basket during the 2009–10 season. He then played two seasons with Paris-Levallois Basket, the second alongside former North Carolina teammate Jawad Williams. On September 25, 2012, BCM Gravelines announced that they had signed Noel. He left them in February 2013.

On March 1, 2013, he signed with Edymax SPU Nitra in Slovakia. In June 2013, he returned to France and signed a one-year deal with Orléans Loiret Basket.

On August 31, 2017, Noel announced his retirement from basketball as he was named head coach for his alma mater, Southern High School in Durham, North Carolina.

== Awards ==
- College Slam Dunk Champion: 2006
- PBA Slam Dunk Champion: 2009
- PBA All-Star MVP: 2009
