= Ronald Tubid =

Filipino basketball player (born 1981)

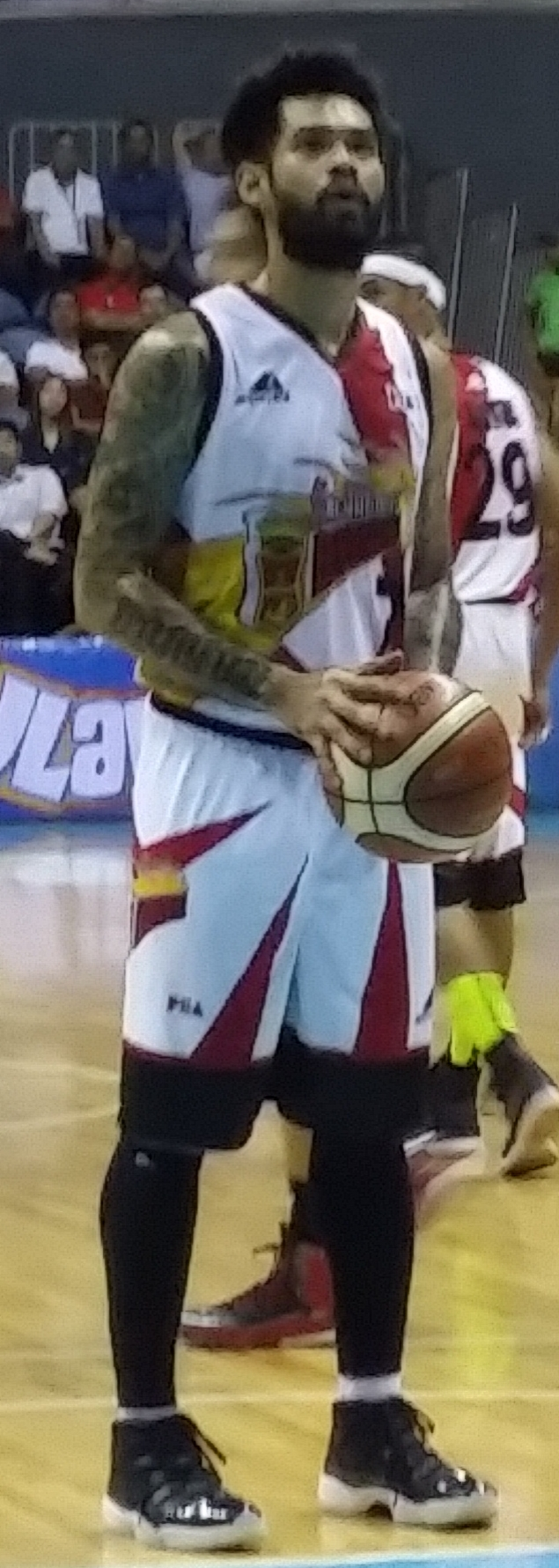
- Tubid with San Miguel in 2016

Terrafirma Dyip
- Title: Head coach
- League: PBA

Personal information
- Born: October 15, 1981 (age 45) Iloilo City, Philippines
- Listed height: 6 ft 1 in (1.85 m)
- Listed weight: 185 lb (84 kg)

Career information
- College: UE
- PBA draft: 2003: 2nd round, 16th overall pick
- Drafted by: Shell Turbo Chargers
- Playing career: 2003–2019
- Position: Shooting guard / small forward
- Coaching career: 2021–present

Career history

Playing
- 2003–2005: Shell Turbo Chargers
- 2005–2006: Air21 Express
- 2006–2012: Barangay Ginebra Kings
- 2012–2013: Barako Bull Energy Cola
- 2013–2017: Petron Blaze Boosters/San Miguel Beermen
- 2017–2018: Kia Picanto / Columbian Dyip
- 2019: San Miguel Beermen

Coaching
- 2021, 2024–2025: Terrafirma Dyip (assistant)
- 2025–present: Terrafirma Dyip

Career highlights
- 9× PBA champion (2006–07 Philippine, 2008 Fiesta, 2014–15 Philippine, 2015 Governors', 2015–16 Philippine, 2016–17 Philippine, 2017 Commissioner's, 2019 Philippine, 2019 Commissioner's); PBA Co-Finals Most Valuable Player (2008 Fiesta); 7× PBA All-Star (2004, 2005, 2007, 2009, 2010, 2017, 2018); PBA All-Defensive Team (2009); 2× PBA Mr. Quality Minutes (2005, 2006); PBA Mr. Energy (2007)

Ronald Tubid (born October 15, 1981) is a Filipino professional basketball coach and former player who is the head coach of the Terrafirma Dyip of the Philippine Basketball Association (PBA). He last played for the San Miguel Beermen of the PBA. Known by many as The Fearless, he was also known, along with backcourt tandem Mark Caguioa and Jayjay Helterbrand, as one-third of the so-called, The Fast, The Furious, and The Fearless. He was also known as The Saint for his resemblance to a depiction of Catholic saint Pedro Calungsod in a 1999 oil painting by Rafael del Casal.

== College career ==
Tubid was the only provincial player in the supposedly all-city college where he ended up being the team captain in his freshman year. He played college hoops in the University of the East in the UAAP.

His former UE Red Warriors teammates who ended up playing in the PBA are Niño Canaleta, James Yap, and Paul Artadi.

Tubid first saw action for ANA Water Dispenser before playing in a star-studded Welcoat Paintmasters squad of Rommel Adducul and Eddie Laure that won the 2002 PBL Challenge Cup.

== PBA career ==
Tubid was drafted by the Shell Turbo Chargers as the sixteenth overall pick in the 2003 PBA draft and averaged 8.9 points in his rookie year. In his second season, he improved his mark to 12.3 points per game before being named Mr. Quality Minutes by the PBA Press Corps.

After Shell's disbandment following the 2004–05 PBA season, Tubid joined the Air21 Express and won his second Mr. Quality Minutes award while averaging 8.9 points in 44 games with just 11 starts.

At the midway point of the 2006–07 PBA Philippine Cup, Tubid was traded to the Barangay Ginebra Kings and was a key reliever in Ginebra's title conquest over sister team San Miguel Beer.

The next conference, Tubid made further improvements due to the absence of Mark Caguioa and Jayjay Helterbrand in the backcourt that eventually rewarded him with an All-Star Game appearance.

In the 2008 PBA Fiesta Conference, Tubid suffered a dislocated ankle injury in a game against Alaska that forced him to sit the rest of the quarterfinals and semifinals. When the Kings were in need of a scorer in Game 4 of the finals, he came off the bench and helped Ginebra even the series at 2–2. Then when the series went to a decisive 7th game, he stepped up when his team needed him most, scoring 20 points in the game to help the Kings win their 8th title. After the series, he along with teammate Eric Menk were named co-Finals MVP of the series. He also received multiple All-Star appearances as member of the Kings.

During the 2010–11 Philippine Cup, he changed his uniform number from 71 to 15 because it represents the date of his birthday.

On January 27, 2012, Tubid was as part of a three-team trade that sent him along with Reil Cervantes and a 2014 2nd-round draft pick to the Barako Bull Energy, Kerby Raymundo and Dylan Ababou to the Barangay Ginebra Kings and JC Intal and a 2012 2nd-round pick to the B-MEG Llamados.

On January 23, 2013, Tubid was involved in a five-team, 10-player trade that sent him to Petron Blaze Boosters. The Blaze Boosters acquired Tubid while giving away Jojo Duncil and Fil-Am rookie Alex Mallari and Petron's 2014 first-round pick (who turned out to be Anthony Semerad). He played a limited role off the bench and won five more championships with the franchise.

During the off-season of 2017, Tubid along with Rashawn McCarthy, Jay-R Reyes and a 2019 first-round draft pick were a part of the revised controversial trade between the San Miguel Beermen and the KIA Picanto that allowed the Beermen to have the no. 1 pick for the 2017 PBA draft who became Christian Standhardinger. On May 18, 2018, Tubid was named as an All-Star replacement for the injured Joe Devance for the Visayas leg of the 2018 All-Star Game.

== PBA career statistics ==
Legend
GP	Games played	MPG	Minutes per game
FG%	Field-goal percentage	3P%	3-point field-goal percentage	FT%	Free-throw percentage
RPG	Rebounds per game	APG	Assists per game	SPG	Steals per game
BPG	Blocks per game	PPG	Points per game	**Bold**	Career high

=== Season-by-season averages ===
Year	Team	GP	MPG	FG%	3P%	FT%	RPG	APG	SPG	BPG	PPG
2003	Shell	34	17.4	.363	.298	.779	3.7	1.0	.7	.2	8.9
2004–05	Shell	**68**	22.2	.375	.310	.695	4.3	1.4	.7	.2	12.3
2005–06	Air21	44	18.5	.353	.319	.766	4.0	1.4	.6	.1	8.9
2006–07	Air21	51	25.9	.424	.324	.707	4.0	**1.9**	**.8**	.2	11.5
2006–07	Barangay Ginebra	51	25.9	.424	.324	.707	4.0	**1.9**	**.8**	.2	11.5
2007–08	Barangay Ginebra	40	26.6	.407	.266	.727	4.3	1.5	.7	**.3**	11.7
2008–09	Barangay Ginebra	48	27.8	.407	.366	.789	4.5	1.8	.5	.2	12.2
2009–10	Barangay Ginebra	50	**27.9**	.395	.377	.698	**5.0**	1.6	.5	.2	**12.7**
2010–11	Barangay Ginebra	58	27.1	.397	.363	.723	4.3	1.5	.4	**.3**	10.5
2011–12	Barangay Ginebra	42	26.0	.361	.322	.655	4.4	1.7	.6	.1	8.1
2011–12	Barako Bull	42	26.0	.361	.322	.655	4.4	1.7	.6	.1	8.1
2012–13	Barako Bull	49	24.7	.366	.289	.714	3.9	1.5	.5	.1	7.4
2012–13	Petron	49	24.7	.366	.289	.714	3.9	1.5	.5	.1	7.4
2013–14	Petron / San Miguel	34	15.7	.340	.323	.792	2.8	.9	.4	.2	4.7
2014–15	San Miguel	52	15.8	**.437**	.350	**.800**	2.4	.7	.3	.1	6.6
2015–16	San Miguel	51	17.9	.341	.298	.787	2.9	.6	.3	.1	5.6
2016–17	San Miguel	47	12.6	.353	.319	.667	1.9	.5	.1	.0	3.7
2017–18	Kia / Columbian	30	17.5	.396	**.409**	.759	3.2	1.1	.4	.2	6.7
2019	San Miguel	22	7.9	.286	.222	.750	1.1	.1	.1	.0	1.9
Career		720	21.5	.384	.329	.732	3.7	1.3	.5	.2	8.8

== Awards and records ==
- 2004 PBA 3-point Shootout Champion
- 2004–05 PBA Mr. Quality Minutes
- 2005–06 PBA Mr. Quality Minutes
- 2008 PBA co-Finals Most Valuable Player
- 2009 PBA All-Defensive Team
- 66th member of the PBA's 5000 career points club
