= Jayjay Helterbrand =

Filipino basketball player

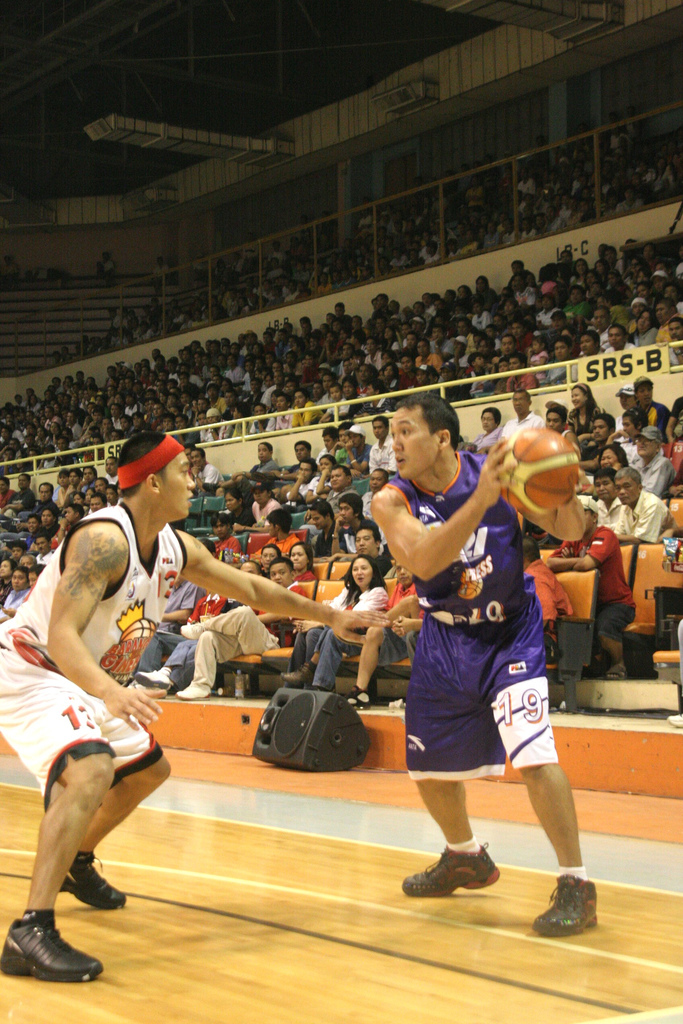
- Helterbrand (left) with the Barangay Ginebra Kings in 2007

Free agent
- Position: Point guard / shooting guard

Personal information
- Born: October 14, 1976 (age 50) Quezon City, Philippines
- Listed height: 5 ft 11 in (1.80 m)
- Listed weight: 170 lb (77 kg)

Career information
- College: Kentucky State
- PBA draft: 2000: Direct hire
- Drafted by: Barangay Ginebra Kings
- Playing career: 2000–2017; 2019–present

Career history
- 2000: Batangas Blades
- 2000–2002, 2004–2017: Barangay Ginebra Kings / Barangay Ginebra San Miguel
- 2019–2020: Imus Khaleb Shawarma
- 2022–2023: Boracay Islanders
- 2023: Imus SV Squad
- 2023–2024: Biñan Tatak Gel

Career highlights
- 6× PBA champion (2004 Fiesta, 2004–05 Philippine, 2006–07 Philippine, 2008 Fiesta, 2016 Governors', 2017 Governors'); PBA Finals MVP (2006–07 Philippine); PBA Most Valuable Player (2009); 2× PBA Best Player of the Conference (2008 Fiesta, 2009 Fiesta); 6× PBA All-Star (2005–2010); 2× PBA All-Star Game MVP (2005, 2007); 2× PBA Mythical First Team (2008, 2009); PBA Comeback Player of the Year (2005); 50 Greatest Players in PBA History (2015 selection)

Anthony "Jayjay" Helterbrand (born Lamberto Romero Vicente Jr. on October 14, 1976) is a Filipino-American basketball player who last played for the Biñan Tatak Gel of the Maharlika Pilipinas Basketball League (MPBL) and Pilipinas Super League (PSL). He previously played with the Barangay Ginebra San Miguel of the Philippine Basketball Association (PBA). Known by many as Helter Skelter, he is also known, along with backcourt tandem Mark Caguioa, as one-half of the so-called, The Fast and the Furious.

== Professional career ==
He played one game for the Batangas Blades in the Metropolitan Basketball Association before signing with the Barangay Ginebra Kings in March 2000. He was recruited by Ginebra through coach Ron Jacobs to play back up for Bal David as preparation to supplant him in the starting lineup.

Helterbrand gained attention after frequently entering games alongside, Mark Caguioa, with the pair becoming known as the "Bandana Brothers" because of the headbands they wore during games. During the 2004 PBA season, the duo was also nicknamed "The Fast and the Furious" because of their style of play. Their partnership has been regarded as one of the league's most notable backcourt tandems.

In 2003, he went back to the States after his first contract with Ginebra expired and negotiation for a new one fell through. He came back at the start of 2004 and was a major contributor in the team's back-to-back championships that year.

Injury sidelined him for five months at the start of 2005 but has mainly recovered and even won two MVP awards for the year, the Brunei Cup and the 2005 PBA All-Stars. He is considered to be one of the best point guards in the league.

After he returned to Ginebra, he quickly made an impact and was named the Comeback Player of the Year by the PBA Press Corps. He assumed the starting point guard chores after Bal David got injured and was subsequently released. He was also named MVP in Team Pilipinas' victorious run in the Sultan Cup in Brunei.

In 2008, he was again included in the RP Training Pool headed by Coach Yeng Guiao.

In 2009, Helterband was awarded the Best Player of the Fiesta Conference for leading the Kings to the finals, and he eventually won the Season MVP. However, the Team Pilipinas couldn't elevate to a much higher finish as they lost to the Korean national team in the battle for 7th place in the 2009 FIBA Asia Championship. An unusual Helterbrand finished his stint with a 1–11 from the three point area.

On June 8, 2009, he was awarded the 2008–2009 PBA season MVP, his first MVP award as a professional since entering the league in 2000.

In August 2015, Helterbrand announced his retirement from the game of basketball at the end of the 2015–16 PBA season. However, after Ginebra won the 2016 Governors' Cup, he announced that he will play for one more season. After the 2016–17 PBA season concluded, Helterbrand announced his retirement after Ginebra winning the 2017 Governor's Cup championship.

== PBA career statistics ==
Legend
GP	Games played	MPG	Minutes per game
FG%	Field-goal percentage	3P%	3-point field-goal percentage	FT%	Free-throw percentage
RPG	Rebounds per game	APG	Assists per game	SPG	Steals per game
BPG	Blocks per game	PPG	Points per game	**Bold**	Career high

=== Season-by-season averages ===
Year	Team	GP	MPG	FG%	3P%	FT%	RPG	APG	SPG	BPG	PPG
2000	Barangay Ginebra	27	22.9	.399	.313	.750	3.0	1.6	.9	**.1**	8.9
2001	Barangay Ginebra	**52**	21.8	.407	.263	**.853**	2.7	2.2	.7	.0	7.9
2002	Barangay Ginebra	27	19.0	.390	.385	.765	2.5	2.4	.7	.0	4.6
2004–05	Barangay Ginebra	**52**	30.2	**.441**	**.408**	.780	3.6	4.9	1.0	**.1**	11.6
2005–06	Barangay Ginebra	42	35.6	.426	.338	.741	4.5	5.1	**1.1**	**.1**	14.4
2006–07	Barangay Ginebra	30	35.6	.401	.292	.696	**4.7**	**8.5**	1.0	.0	13.1
2007–08	Barangay Ginebra	45	35.8	.275	.367	.704	**4.7**	6.5	.8	.0	**18.1**
2008–09	Barangay Ginebra	46	**36.0**	.398	.374	.811	3.8	5.0	.9	.0	17.6
2009–10	Barangay Ginebra	36	28.7	.369	.285	.705	3.3	4.6	.9	**.1**	8.6
2010–11	Barangay Ginebra	29	19.7	.369	.280	.542	2.2	2.7	.9	.0	5.4
2011–12	Barangay Ginebra	34	24.1	.368	.339	.731	2.2	3.5	.8	.0	7.2
2012–13	Barangay Ginebra	49	20.7	.344	.317	.676	2.7	2.5	.4	**.1**	6.6
2013–14	Barangay Ginebra	41	15.9	.370	.288	.826	1.9	2.0	.4	**.1**	5.2
2014–15	Barangay Ginebra	26	12.9	.278	.231	.688	1.6	1.7	.4	.0	2.8
2015–16	Barangay Ginebra	35	7.3	.315	.228	.250	1.1	.6	.3	.0	1.7
2016–17	Barangay Ginebra	19	6.5	.206	.130	.600	.6	1.2	.3	.0	1.1
Career		590	24.5	.375	.329	.741	3.0	3.6	.7	.1	9.1

== Personal life ==
Helterbrand is in a relationship to Filipina actress RR Enriquez.
