= 2012–13 San Mig Coffee Mixers season =

- Head coach: Tim Cone
- Owners: San Miguel-Pure Foods Co., Inc. (a San Miguel Corporation subsidiary)

Philippine Cup results
- Record: 13–6 (68.4%)
- Place: 3rd
- Playoff finish: Semifinalist (def by. Rain or Shine, 4–2)

Commissioner's Cup results
- Record: 13–8 (61.9%)
- Place: 3rd
- Playoff finish: Semifinalist (def by. Alaska, 3–1)

Governors' Cup results
- Record: 14–8 (63.6%)
- Place: 1st
- Playoff finish: Champions (def. Petron, 4–3)

San Mig Coffee Mixers seasons

The 2012–13 San Mig Coffee Mixers season was the 25th season of the franchise in the Philippine Basketball Association (PBA).

== Key dates ==
- August 19: The 2012 PBA Draft took place in Robinson's Midtown Mall, Manila.
- August 20: San Miguel-Purefoods Company, Inc. announced that they will rename the B-Meg Llamados as the San Mig Coffee Mixers.

== Draft picks ==
Round	Pick	Player	Position	Nationality	College
1	5	Aldrech Ramos	F/C	Philippines	Far Eastern
2	3	Jewel Ponferrada	C	Philippines	National
3	9	Gian Chiu	C	United States	Oberlin
4	6	Ramon Mabayo	G	Philippines	STI

== Roster ==
2012–13 San Mig Coffee Mixers roster
Players
Coaches

Pos.	#	POB	Name	Height	Weight	DOB (YYYY–MM–DD)	From
C	4	(United States)	Rafi Reavis	6 ft 8 in (2.03 m)	205 lb (93 kg)		Coppin State
SG	8	(Philippines)	Peter June Simon	6 ft 1 in (1.85 m)	180 lb (82 kg)		Mindanao
PG	9	(Philippines)	Lester Alvarez (R)	5 ft 8 in (1.73 m)	154 lb (70 kg)		Adamson
PF	10	(Philippines)	Jewel Ponferada (R)	6 ft 5 in (1.96 m)	210 lb (95 kg)		National-U
SG	11	(United States)	Alex Mallari (R)	6 ft 4 in (1.93 m)	167 lb (76 kg)		Lewis–Clark State
PG	14	(Philippines)	Mark Barroca	5 ft 10 in (1.78 m)	170 lb (77 kg)		Far Eastern
PF	15	(Philippines)	Marc Pingris	6 ft 5 in (1.96 m)	210 lb (95 kg)		PSBA
SG	18	(Philippines)	James Yap	6 ft 3 in (1.91 m)	205 lb (93 kg)		UE
SF	19	(Philippines)	Jerwin Gaco	6 ft 4 in (1.93 m)	180 lb (82 kg)		De La Salle
G/F	22	(Philippines)	Allein Maliksi (injured)	6 ft 3 in (1.91 m)	180 lb (82 kg)		UST
SF	30	(Philippines)	Leo Najorda	6 ft 3 in (1.91 m)	190 lb (86 kg)		San Sebastian
SF	33	(Philippines)	Val Acuña	6 ft 4 in (1.93 m)	179 lb (81 kg)		UE
PF	38	(United States)	Joe Devance	6 ft 7 in (2.01 m)	215 lb (98 kg)		UTEP
C	95	(Philippines)	Yancy De Ocampo	6 ft 9 in (2.06 m)	220 lb (100 kg)		Saint Francis of Assisi

Head coach

- (United States) Tim Cone (George Washington)

Assistant coach(es)

- (Philippines) Richard del Rosario (De La Salle)
- (Philippines) Olsen Racela (Ateneo)
- (Philippines) Johnny Abarrientos (Far Eastern)
- (United States) Jeffrey Cariaso (Sonoma State)

Team manager

- (Philippines) Alvin Patrimonio (Mapúa)

Legend

- (C) Team captain
- (CI) Commissioner's Cup Import
- (GI) Governors' Cup Import
- (EI) EASL Import
- (DP) Unsigned draft pick
- (FA) Free agent
- (IN) Inactive
- (S) Suspended
- (R) Rookie
- Injured

Roster

== Philippine Cup ==
=== Eliminations ===
==== Standings ====
Pos	Team	W	L	PCT	GB	Qualification
1	Talk 'N Text Tropang Texters	12	2	.857	—	Twice-to-beat in the quarterfinals
2	San Mig Coffee Mixers	10	4	.714	2	Twice-to-beat in the quarterfinals
3	Rain or Shine Elasto Painters	9	5	.643	3	Best-of-three quarterfinals
4	Meralco Bolts	8	6	.571 (Note: Head-to-head record: Alaska 1–1 Meralco (Meralco +4))	4	Best-of-three quarterfinals
5	Alaska Aces	8	6	.571	4	Best-of-three quarterfinals
6	Barangay Ginebra San Miguel	7	7	.500	5	Best-of-three quarterfinals
7	Petron Blaze Boosters	6	8	.429	6	Twice-to-win in the quarterfinals
8	Air21 Express	5	9	.357	7	Twice-to-win in the quarterfinals
9	Barako Bull Energy Cola	4	10	.286	8	
10	GlobalPort Batang Pier	1	13	.071	11	

Source: PBA.ph

==== Game log ====
Total: 10–4

2012–13 PBA Philippine Cup game log
October: 4–2

Game	Date	Opponent	Score	High points	High rebounds	High assists	Location Attendance	Record	
1	October 5	Alaska	103–83	de Ocampo (22)	de Ocampo (13)	Villanueva (7)	Smart Araneta Coliseum	1–0	Boxscore
2	October 14	Petron Blaze	90–84	Yap (18)	de Ocampo (7)	Villanueva (5)	Smart Araneta Coliseum	2–0	Boxscore
3	October 20	Talk 'N Text	74–85	Yap (18)	de Ocampo (10)	Simon, Barroca (4)	Ynares Center	2–1	Boxscore
4	October 24	Rain or Shine	79–80	Yap (28)	Reavis (11)	de Ocampo (4)	Smart Araneta Coliseum	2–2	Boxscore
5	October 28	Barako Bull	92–91	Yap (21)	de Ocampo (8)	Barroca (4)	Smart Araneta Coliseum	3–2	Boxscore
6	October 31	GlobalPort	82–78	Pingris (17)	Pingris (16)	Devance, Barroca (4)	Smart Araneta Coliseum	4–2	Boxscore

November : 4–1

Game	Date	Opponent	Score	High points	High rebounds	High assists	Location Attendance	Record	
7	November 4	Barangay Ginebra	78–68	Devance (18)	Pingris (9)	de Ocampo (6)	Smart Araneta Coliseum	5–2	Boxscore
8	November 10	Alaska	77–68	Devance (18)	Pingris (13)	Simon, Pingris (3)	Lapu-Lapu City	6–2	Boxscore
9	November 16	Barako Bull	93–73	Yap (22)	Yap (9)	Barroca (4)	Ynares Center	7–2	Boxscore
10	November 21	Talk 'N Text	63–92	Yap (13)	Devance (14)	Intal (5)	Smart Araneta Coliseum	7–3	Boxscore
11	November 23	Air21	89–80	Yap (20)	Devance (11)	Devance (5)	Smart Araneta Coliseum	8–3	Boxscore

December : 2–1

Game	Date	Opponent	Score	High points	High rebounds	High assists	Location Attendance	Record	
12	December 2	Rain or Shine	93–92	Simon (24)	de Ocampo (13)	Barroca (7)	Smart Araneta Coliseum	9–3	Boxscore
13	December 7	GlobalPort	107–96	Simon (27)	de Ocampo (13)	Devance (10)	Mall of Asia Arena	10–3	Boxscore
14	December 9	Meralco	77–87	Simon (19)	Simon, Barroca, de Ocampo, Pingris (5)	Villanueva (5)	Smart Araneta Coliseum	10–4	Boxscore

2012–13 schedule

=== Playoffs ===
==== Bracket ====
Quarterfinals
(#1 twice-to-beat)
1	Talk 'N Text	105
8	Air21	100
(Best-of-3)
4	Meralco	0
5	Alaska	2
(#2 twice-to-beat)
2	San Mig Coffee	92*
7	Petron Blaze	87
(Best-of-3)
3	Rain or Shine	2
6	Barangay Ginebra	1

Semifinals (Best-of-7)
1	Talk 'N Text	4
5	Alaska	2
2	San Mig Coffee	2
3	Rain or Shine	4

Finals (Best-of-7)
1	Talk 'N Text	4
3	Rain or Shine	0

*Game went into overtime

==== Game log ====
2012–13 PBA Philippine Cup playoffs game log
Quarterfinals: 1–0

Game	Date	Opponent	Score	High points	High rebounds	High assists	Location Attendance	Series	
1	December 13	Petron Blaze	92–87*	Yap (23)	Pingris (11)	Devance (5)	Smart Araneta Coliseum	1–0	Boxscore

Semifinals: 2–4

Game	Date	Opponent	Score	High points	High rebounds	High assists	Location Attendance	Series	
1	December 19	Rain or Shine	83–91	de Ocampo (17)	Yap, 2 others (7)	de Ocampo, Barroca (4)	Smart Araneta Coliseum	0–1	Boxscore
2	December 21	Rain or Shine	106–82	Yap (34)	Yap (10)	Barroca (8)	Mall of Asia Arena	1–1	Boxscore
3	December 25	Rain or Shine	72–98	Simon (22)	Devance (8)	Simon (4)	Mall of Asia Arena	1–2	Boxscore
4	December 28	Rain or Shine	74–83	Yap (20)	Pingris (13)	Pingris (4)	Mall of Asia Arena	1–3	Boxscore
5	December 30	Rain or Shine	79–67	Devance (20)	Simon (11)	Devance (4)	Mall of Asia Arena	2–3	Boxscore
6	January 3	Rain or Shine	83–90	Simon (29)	Pingris (11)	Barroca (5)	Mall of Asia Arena	2–4	Boxscore

2012–13 schedule

== Commissioner's Cup ==
=== Eliminations ===
==== Standings ====
Pos	Team	W	L	PCT	GB	Qualification
1	Alaska Aces	11	3	.786	—	Twice-to-beat in the quarterfinals
2	Rain or Shine Elasto Painters	9	5	.643	2	Twice-to-beat in the quarterfinals
3	Petron Blaze Boosters	8	6	.571 (Note: Head-to-head record: Petron 2–0 San Mig)	3	Best-of-three quarterfinals
4	San Mig Coffee Mixers	8	6	.571	3	Best-of-three quarterfinals
5	Meralco Bolts	7	7	.500 (Note: Head-to-head quotient: Meralco 1.01, TNT 1.00, Barangay Ginebra 0.99)	4	Best-of-three quarterfinals
6	Talk 'N Text Tropang Texters	7	7	.500	4	Best-of-three quarterfinals
7	Barangay Ginebra San Miguel	7	7	.500	4	Twice-to-win in the quarterfinals
8	Air21 Express	6	8	.429	5	Twice-to-win in the quarterfinals
9	Barako Bull Energy Cola	5	9	.357	6	
10	GlobalPort Batang Pier	2	12	.143	9	

Source: PBA.ph

==== Game log ====
Total: 8–6

2013 PBA Commissioner's Cup game log
February: 1–3

Game	Date	Opponent	Score	High points	High rebounds	High assists	Location Attendance	Record	
1	February 8	Barako Bull	75–79	Yap (19)	Simon (11)	Devance (7)	Smart Araneta Coliseum	0–1	Boxscore
2	February 13	Petron Blaze	73–98	Yap (25)	Rogers (9)	Devance (4)	Smart Araneta Coliseum	0–2	Boxscore
3	February 22	Rain or Shine	65–93	Mallari (15)	Bowles (14)	Pingris, Pacana (3)	Mall of Asia Arena	0–3	Boxscore
4	February 24	Talk 'N Text	90–82	Bowles (29)	Bowles (23)	Barroca (5)	Smart Araneta Coliseum	1–3	Boxscore

March: 4–3

Game	Date	Opponent	Score	High points	High rebounds	High assists	Location Attendance	Record	
5	March 2	GlobalPort	91–84	Simon (19)	Bowles (7)	Pingris, Devance (4)	Naga, Camarines Sur	2–3	Boxscore
6	March 6	Alaska	75–68	Bowles (16)	Bowles (11)	Bowles (5)	Smart Araneta Coliseum	3–3	Boxscore
7	March 10	Barangay Ginebra	88–96	Bowles (25)	Bowles (16)	Barroca (5)	Smart Araneta Coliseum	3–4	Boxscore
8	March 15	Meralco	76–71	Bowles (23)	Bowles, Pingris (16)	Barroca (4)	Smart Araneta Coliseum	4–4	Boxscore
9	March 20	Air21	82–87	Bowles (24)	Bowles (12)	Bowles, Reavis, Pingris (3)	Smart Araneta Coliseum	4–5	Boxscore
10	March 23	Alaska	84–83	Bowles (30)	Bowles (23)	Pingris (6)	Smart Araneta Coliseum	5–5	Boxscore
11	March 31	Barako Bull	100–105	Bowles (24)	Bowles (18)	Barroca (6)	Mall of Asia Arena	5–6	Boxscore

April : 2–0

Game	Date	Opponent	Score	High points	High rebounds	High assists	Location Attendance	Record	
12	April 3	Talk N' Text	83–82	Bowles (18)	Pingris (10)	Barroca (5)	Smart Araneta Coliseum	6–6	Boxscore
13	April 10	Air 21	80–66	Bowles (29)	Bowles (16)	Devance (7)	Smart Araneta Coliseum	7–6	Boxscore
14	April 13	Meralco	97–90	Bowles (27)	Bowles (17)	Barroca (10)	Smart Araneta Coliseum	8–6	Boxscore

2012–13 schedule

=== Playoffs ===
==== Bracket ====
Quarterfinals
(#1 twice-to-beat)
1	Alaska	87
8	Air21	81
(Best-of-3)
4	San Mig Coffee	2
5	Meralco	1
(#2 twice-to-beat)
2	Rain or Shine	83	79
7	Barangay Ginebra	90	81
(Best-of-3)
3	Petron	0
6	Talk 'N Text	2

Semifinals (Best-of-5)
1	Alaska	3
4	San Mig Coffee	1
7	Barangay Ginebra	3
6	Talk 'N Text	2

Finals (Best-of-5)
1	Alaska	3
7	Barangay Ginebra	0

==== Game log ====
2013 PBA Commissioner's Cup playoffs game log
Quarterfinals: 2–1

Game	Date	Opponent	Score	High points	High rebounds	High assists	Location Attendance	Series	
1	April 19	Meralco	85–88	Bowles (37)	Bowles (18)	Ross (8)	Smart Araneta Coliseum	0–1	Boxscore
2	April 21	Meralco	100–92	Bowles (35)	Bowles (14)	Simon, Barroca, Yap, & Devance (4)	Smart Araneta Coliseum	1–1	Boxscore
3	April 24	Meralco	90–82	Bowles (23)	Bowles (11)	Pingris, Devance (5)	Smart Araneta Coliseum	2–1	Boxscore

Semifinals: 1–3

Game	Date	Opponent	Score	High points	High rebounds	High assists	Location Attendance	Series	
1	April 27	Alaska	71–69	Simon (15)	Bowles (13)	Barroca & Yap (8)	Smart Araneta Coliseum	1–0	Boxscore
2	April 29	Alaska	67–86	Devance & Simon (15)	Bowles (17)	Simon, Bowles, Yap, Mallari, & De Ocampo (2)	Smart Araneta Coliseum	1–1	Boxscore
3	May 8	Alaska	82–89	Bowles (19)	Bowles & Pingris (15)	Barroca & Pingris (6)	Smart Araneta Coliseum	1–2	Boxscore
4	May 11	Alaska	78–83	Bowles (23)	Bowles (22)	Barroca (7)	Smart Araneta Coliseum	1–3	Boxscore

2012–13 schedule

== Governors' Cup ==
=== Eliminations ===
==== Standings ====
Pos	Team	W	L	PCT	GB	Qualification
1	Petron Blaze Boosters	8	1	.889	—	Twice-to-beat in the quarterfinals
2	San Mig Coffee Mixers	6	3	.667	2	Twice-to-beat in the quarterfinals
3	Meralco Bolts	5	4	.556 (Note: Head-to-head record: Meralco 1–0 Rain or Shine)	3	Twice-to-beat in the quarterfinals
4	Rain or Shine Elasto Painters	5	4	.556	3	Twice-to-beat in the quarterfinals
5	GlobalPort Batang Pier	4	5	.444 (Note: Head-to-head quotient: GlobalPort 1.01, Barako Bull 1.00, Alaska 0.99)	4	Twice-to-win in the quarterfinals
6	Barako Bull Energy	4	5	.444	4	Twice-to-win in the quarterfinals
7	Alaska Aces	4	5	.444	4	Twice-to-win in the quarterfinals
8	Barangay Ginebra San Miguel	3	6	.333 (Note: Head-to-head quotient: Talk 'N Text 1.05, Barangay Ginebra 1.00, Air21 0.96; eighth seed playoff: Barangay Ginebra 110–102 Talk 'N Text)	5	Twice-to-win in the quarterfinals
9	Talk 'N Text Tropang Texters	3	6	.333	5	
10	Air21 Express	3	6	.333	5	

Source: PBA.ph

==== Game log ====
Total: 6–3

2013 PBA Governors' Cup game log
August: 1–3

Game	Date	Opponent	Score	High points	High rebounds	High assists	Location Attendance	Record	
1	August 14	Rain or Shine	75–79	Blakely (26)	Blakely (20)	Barroca (6)	Mall of Asia Arena	0–1	Boxscore
2	August 17	Air21	93–82	Blakely (37)	Blakely (25)	Barroca (7)	Ynares Center	0–2	Boxscore
3	August 25	Talk 'N Text	118–99	Blakely (24)	Blakely (17)	Blakely (8)	Mall of Asia Arena	1–2	Recap
4	August 31	Petron Blaze	83–89	Blakely (25)	Blakely (14)	Blakely (7)	Mall of Asia Arena	1–3	Boxscore

September: 5–0

Game	Date	Opponent	Score	High points	High rebounds	High assists	Location Attendance	Record	
5	September 4	GlobalPort	102–87	Blakely (25)	Blakely, Maliksi (9)	Blakely, Barroca (6)	Smart Araneta Coliseum	2–3	Boxscore
6	September 8	Ginebra	89–86	Blakely (30)	Blakely (10)	Blakely, Barroca (3)	Smart Araneta Coliseum	3–3	Boxscore
7	September 10	Alaska	95–82	Blakely (22)	Blakely (28)	Blakely (8)	Mall of Asia Arena	4–3	Boxscore
8	September 14	Barako Bull	81–77	Blakely (22)	Blakely (14)	Maliksi (5)	Ynares Center	5–3	Boxscore
9	September 20	Meralco	88–87	Blakely (24)	Blakely (13)	Reavis, Blakely, Pingris, Barroca (3)	Smart Araneta Coliseum	6–3	Boxscore

2012–13 schedule

=== Playoffs ===
==== Bracket ====
Quarterfinals (Top 4 twice-to-beat)
1	Petron Blaze	101
8	Barangay Ginebra	94
4	Rain or Shine	108
5	GlobalPort	106
2	San Mig Coffee	105	83
7	Alaska	112	73
3	Meralco	86
6	Barako Bull	68

Semifinals (Best-of-5)
1	Petron Blaze	3
4	Rain or Shine	1
2	San Mig Coffee	3
3	Meralco	1

Finals (Best-of-7)
1	Petron Blaze	3
2	San Mig Coffee	4

==== Game log ====
2013 PBA Governors' Cup playoffs game log
Quarterfinals: 1–1

Game	Date	Opponent	Score	High points	High rebounds	High assists	Location Attendance	Series	
1	September 25	Alaska	105–112	Blakely (27)	Blakely (12)	Blakely (7)	Smart Araneta Coliseum	0–1	Boxscore
2	September 27	Alaska	83–73	Blakely (30)	Blakely (15)	Blakely, Mallari (3)	Mall of Asia Arena	1–1	Boxscore

Semifinals: 3–1

Game	Date	Opponent	Score	High points	High rebounds	High assists	Location Attendance	Series	
1	September 29	Meralco	83–73	Devance (17)	Blakely(10)	Pingris(4)	Smart Araneta Coliseum	1–0	Boxscore
2	October 1	Meralco	69–73	Blakely (24)	Blakely (15)	Blakely, Barroca (5)	Smart Araneta Coliseum	1–1	Boxscore
3	October 4	Meralco	94–87	Mallari (23)	Blakely (22)	Reavis (7)	Smart Araneta Coliseum	2–1	Boxscore
4	October 6	Meralco	79–73	Blakely (23)	Blakely (19)	Pingris(4)	Smart Araneta Coliseum	3–1	Boxscore

Finals: 4–3

Game	Date	Opponent	Score	High points	High rebounds	High assists	Location Attendance	Series	
1	October 11	Petron Blaze	84–100	Blakely (23)	Blakely(14)	de Ocampo(6)	Mall of Asia Arena	0–1	Boxscore
2	October 13	Petron Blaze	100–93	Blakely (23)	Blakely (16)	Blakely (6)	Smart Araneta Coliseum	1–1	Boxscore
3	October 16	Petron Blaze	68–90	Blakely (17)	Blakely (10)	Blakely, Pingris (4)	Smart Araneta Coliseum	1–2	Boxscore
4	October 18	Petron Blaze	88–86	Blakely (19)	Blakely (13)	Blakely (6)	Mall of Asia Arena	2–2	–
5	October 20	Petron Blaze	114–103	Blakely (30)	Blakely (15)	Barroca (10)	Smart Araneta Coliseum	3–2	Boxscore
6	October 23	Petron Blaze	88–99	Blakely (21)	Blakely (11)	Mallari, Pingris (4)	Smart Araneta Coliseum	3–3	Boxscore
7	October 25	Petron Blaze	87–77	Pingris, Blakely (19)	Pingris (17)	Barroca (4)	Smart Araneta Coliseum	4–3	–

2012–13 schedule

== Transactions ==
=== Trades ===
==== Pre-season ====
August 20, 2012	To B-Meg 2012 1st round pick (Aldrech Ramos)	To Barako Bull Sean Anthony
September 21, 2012	To San Mig Coffee 2013 1st round pick (from GlobalPort); Wesley Gonzales	To Barako Bull Josh Urbiztondo

==== Commissioner's Cup ====
January 22, 2013	To San Mig Coffee Mixers Alex Mallari; Leo Najorda; Lester Alvarez; 2014 1st round pick (originally from Petron Blaze)	To Barako Bull JC Intal; Jonas Villanueva; Aldrech Ramos

=== Governors' Cup ===
August 12, 2013	To San Mig Coffee Allein Maliksi	To Barako Bull Wesley Gonzales; Chris Pacana; 2017 2nd round pick

=== Recruited imports ===
Tournament	Name	Debuted	Last game	Record
Commissioner's Cup	Matt Rogers	February 13 (vs. Petron)	February 13 (vs. Petron)	0–1
Commissioner's Cup	Denzel Bowles	February 22 (vs. Rain or Shine)	May 11 (vs. Alaska)	11–8
Governors' Cup	Marqus Blakely	August 14 (vs. Rain or Shine)	October 25 (vs. Petron)	15–8
