= PJ Simon =

Filipino basketball player (1980–2026)

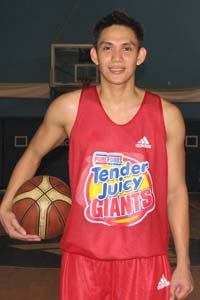
- Simon in 2008

Personal information
- Born: June 1, 1980 Makilala, Cotabato, Philippines
- Died: November 20, 2026 (aged 46) Davao City, Philippines
- Listed height: 5 ft 11 in (1.80 m)
- Listed weight: 180 lb (82 kg)

Career information
- High school: Notre Dame of Makilala (Makilala, Cotabato)
- College: UMin
- PBA draft: 2001: 5th round, 43rd overall pick
- Drafted by: Sta. Lucia Realtors
- Playing career: 2001–2020; 2024–2025
- Position: Shooting guard

Career history
- 2001–2002: Davao Eagles
- 2002–2004: Hapee Toothpaste / Fash Liquid Detergent
- 2004–2020: Magnolia Hotshots
- 2024–2025: Davao Occidental Tigers

Career highlights
- 8× PBA champion (2006 Philippine, 2010 Philippine, 2012 Commissioner's, 2013 Governors', 2014 Philippine, 2014 Commissioner's, 2014 Governors', 2018 Governors'); 8× PBA All-Star (2008, 2009, 2011, 2014, 2015, 2017–2019); PBA All-Star Game MVP (2008); PBA Mythical Second Team (2014); 2× PBA Mr. Quality Minutes (2008, 2014); PBA Three-Point Shootout champion (2019); No. 8 retired by Magnolia Hotshots; 2x PBL champion (2003 Sunkist-Unity, 2003-04 Platinum); PBL Most Valuable Player (2003-04 Platinum); PBL Finals MVP (2003-04 Platinum); PBL Mythical First Team (2003-04 Platinum)

Peter June Libo-on Simon (June 1, 1980 – November 20, 2026) was a Filipino professional basketball player who played in the Philippine Basketball Association with the Magnolia Hotshots franchise for 16 years. Simon was drafted 43rd overall in the 2001 PBA draft by the Sta. Lucia Realtors. His moniker was Scoring Apostle.

He last played professionally for the Davao Occidental Tigers of the Maharlika Pilipinas Basketball League (MPBL).

== Amateur career ==
=== College career ===
Born in Makilala, Cotabato, Simon had been relatively unknown in the Philippine college basketball scene. he built his reputation down south by joining in various competitions and leaving his marks on them. He collected three MVP trophies in the collegiate leagues in Davao City and reigned five times as the Sultan of Slams.

=== Metropolitan Basketball Association ===
Having created a status in various collegiate and commercial leagues in Mindanao, Simon was easily handpicked to be a part of the Davao Eagles in the Metropolitan Basketball Association. Although his career with the Eagles did not start well, he caught fire as the 2001 MBA First Phase progressed. He was at the forefront of the Eagles onslaught in several games. He once sparked a fourth-quarter rally to upset the league-leading Negros Slashers. He engaged with Laguna Lakers' Biboy Simon in a fiery shootout and at the same time registering his career-high 25 points. Coming off the bench, he scored a new career-high 28 points as they outclassed Nueva Ecija Patriots during which he made five Blitz Three baskets in the game. In his best outing as an Eagle, Simon fired yet another new career-high 41 points as he was simply unstoppable.

At the end of the season, Simon's hard work and heroics on the court paid off as he was named as the Discovery Player of the Year.

Also, while playing in the MBA, he became a member of the Philippine national basketball team. In his first stint with the national team, PJ Simon scored 14 points to backup Reynel Hugnatan as the MBA All-Stars opened its 25th William Jones Cup campaign on a high note, tripping the much taller Russian club Lokomotive Novosibirsk, 78–68, at the Taipei Physical Education College Gym.

=== Philippine Basketball League ===
Following the disbandment of the MBA in July 2002, Simon was immediately enlisted by Dazz Dishwashing Liquid, the Lamoiyan Corporation's Philippine Basketball League franchise. In no time, he created a big mark in the star-studded 2002–03 PBL Challenge Cup. For his efforts, PJ Simon was selected into the Second Mythical Team during the Individual Players Achievement Awards. He also helped the team barge into the finals. In his first PBL finals appearance, PJ Simon led Dazz in a losing cause by scoring 18 points as they surrendered to the Welcoat Paintmasters in overtime in Game 1 at the Quezon Convention Center in Lucena City.

Although Dazz failed to win the title, a change of the team's name had boded well for the Lamoiyan franchise's fortunes. Hapee Toothpaste opened its championship run in the 2003 Sunkist PBL Unity Cup by defeating Viva Mineral Water behind the blazing guns of PJ Simon and Ryan Dy. Then in the deciding game 5 of Unity Cup finals, Hapee rode again on the heroics of PJ Simon to capture the crown. For that, he and teammate Rich Alvarez were later awarded by the PBL Press Corps as co-Final MVPs.

In the 2003 PBL–CBF dual meet finals, he and Allan Salangsang combined for 35 points off the bench as they powered Fash Liquid to beat Grachiya Energy Boosters, 86–76, at the Cebu Coliseum.

The following conference, PJ Simon won the 2003–04 PBL Platinum Cup MVP. Joining PJ Simon in the Mythical Team were Jojo Tangkay, Fash teammate Rich Alvarez, and future Purefoods teammates James Yap and Ervin Sotto. He also led his team in another title, beating the Welcoat Paintmasters in a contested five-game series.

== Professional career ==
=== Magnolia Hotshots (2004–2020) ===
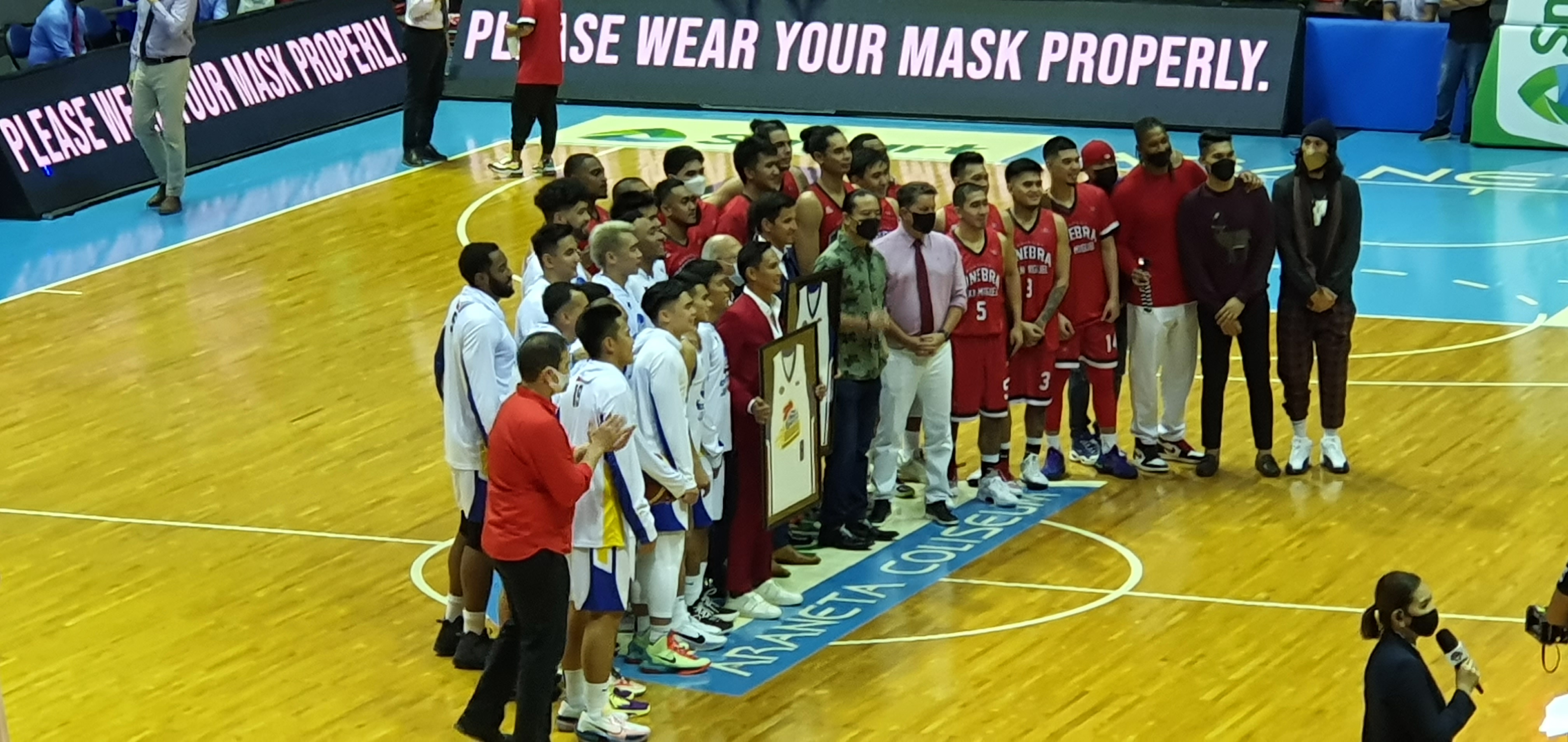
Mark Pingris and Peter June Simon poses with their framed retired jerseys together with the players of Magnolia Hotshots and Barangay Ginebra San Miguel during their jersey retirement ceremony held at halftime between the two teams on December 25, 2021.

While still playing for Fash in the PBL, Purefoods offered him a two-year contract as a rookie free agent. He was actually drafted by the Sta. Lucia Realtors as the 43rd overall pick in the 2001 PBA draft. He toiled for a while in the MBA and PBL where he further enhanced his skills.

But like his stints in the MBA and PBL, his PBA career did not start hot as he played behind fellow star rookie James Yap. In Purefoods' seventh game in the 2004–05 Philippines Cup, however, PJ got his game going as he led Purefoods in a come-from-behind win over Alaska, by scoring four of his team-high 18 points in the final eleven seconds of the game.

In his first three seasons in the PBA, PJ Simon only showed flashes of his brilliance far and wide. In the 2007 PBA Fiesta Cup, he was named Accel PBA Player of the Week for the period May 6 to 13. He came up with a team-high 22 points in a game against Coke on May 4 then on May 13, he exploded for PBA career-high 31 points and also grabbed 10 rebounds to lead Purefoods in routing Ginebra, 117–105.

The 2007–08 season proved to be the coming-out party for Simon. While he was still in the giant shadow of his more famous teammates, he created his niche by being the "super sub" for his team. As Purefoods set a franchise-record of 7–0 to start a season, he was the biggest hero in two of those wins. He scored 15 of his game-high 27 points in the first quarter to lead Purefoods to its fifth straight win as they massacred Ginebra, 103–76, on November 4, 2007.

Then ten days later, he once more top-scored for Purefoods by making 22 points in their 100–81 rout of Air21, tying the franchise's best to start in the All-Filipino Cup.

In the finals, Simon had four scintillating games. Purefoods lost, however, to Sta. Lucia in seven games. But nevertheless, PJ Simon averaged 13.3 points to firmly establish himself as Purefoods' primary offensive option off the bench.

Owing to his impressive performance in the 2007–08 PBA Philippine Cup, he was selected in a reserve role to take part in the 2008 All-Star Game held in Bacolod City. Simon did not disappoint the fans, as although he only played for 20 minutes, he scored 29 points on 11-of-14 field goals and 4-of-4 on the free-throw line to tow the South team in a thrilling victory in overtime over the North squad, 163–158. With that, he was cited as the Most Valuable Player, his first major PBA award.

In the 2009–10 Philippine Cup finals, Purefoods swept Alaska, 4–0, to be crowned 2009–2010 PBA Philippine Cup champions.

The Llamados entered the 2010–11 PBA Philippine Cup as defending champions. In the first round of the tournament, Simon averaged 17.4 points per game, while the team ended the Classification Phase with a 7–7 record. On November 10, 2010, Simon scored a career-high 42 points against the Air21 Express. Him and two-time MVP James Yap led the team to the quarterfinals, in which the Llamados scored back-to-back wins against the Meralco Bolts. For the series, Simon averaged 29.0 points and his contributions helped the Llamados to overcome Meralco in two games. However, they couldn't keep up the momentum in the semifinals after losing to the Talk 'N Text Tropang Texters in six games.

The 2011–12 season saw Simon and his team, B-Meg, being favorites in winning possibly the Grand Slam title with their new coach being the legendary coach Tim Cone. Simon helped the Llamados to a 10–4 win–loss record in the 2011–12 Philippine Cup, but unfortunately, the Llamados were knocked out in the quarterfinals after an upset by the Powerade Tigers led by Gary David. After being upset in the Philippine Cup, B-Meg decided to keep their roster from the Philippine Cup intact. Their only addition to the roster is their import Denzel Bowles, who eventually won the Best Import of the Conference. Bowles helped the team to a 3rd-place finish in the elimination round. B-Meg was able to win the quarterfinal series against Meralco and the semis against rivals Barangay Ginebra. Simon and Co. faced the Talk 'N Text Tropang Texters in the final, where they won the series in seven games. Going into the Governors' Cup, B-Meg gained confidence following their championship in the Commissioner's Cup, but they lost to Rain or Shine in seven games. Simon averaged 12.0 points per game on 47% field goal shooting.

Simon played a total of 64 games in the 2012–13 season, a career-high for him at the time. Although, Simon and his teammates were not able to make the finals in the first two conferences, being knocked out in the semifinals in the Philippine Cup and Commissioner's Cup. In the Governors' Cup, they made a finals appearance and became the eventual champion, beating its sister team Petron Blaze Boosters in a tightly contested seven-game series. Simon averaged 12.8 points in 28.0 minutes of action in 64 games.

The 2013–14 PBA season was notable for Simon as he and the Mixers won a rare Grand Slam. He was a part of the PBA Second Mythical Team along with teammate Marc Pingris, Paul Lee, Sonny Thoss, and Rookie of the Year [[Greg Slaughter] Simon was also awarded the PBA Press Corps Mr. Quality Minutes Simon and also scored the most two-point shots and recorded the highest total points among all players in the league.

Serving as a key player off the bench, Simon appeared in a career-high 66 games, averaging 13.5 points and 3.4 rebounds in 28.8 minutes per game. Despite the Mixers finishing the elimination rounds of all three conferences with a combined 16–16 win–loss record, including a 4-5 standing in the Commissioner's Cup, Simon provided critical perimeter shooting off the bench which helped steady the team as they went on to win all three conference championships to secure the Grand Slam.

== Personal life ==
Simon was the youngest among the three children of Pedro Simon Jr., a teacher and Cristina. He was the only athlete in the family, although his father played some basketball but not in the commercial leagues. After his mother succumbed to cancer, his father remarried. From his father and stepmother Flor, Simon has a half-brother and a half-sister.

He was married to Binibining Pilipinas Supranational 2018 Jehza Mae Huelar. The couple had two children.

== Death ==
Simon collapsed shortly after he was subbed-out in a 40-and-above basketball league game on November 20, 2026. He was rushed to the San Pedro Hospital in Davao City where he was declared dead on arrival.

== PBA career statistics ==
Legend
GP	Games played	MPG	Minutes per game
FG%	Field-goal percentage	3P%	3-point field-goal percentage	FT%	Free-throw percentage
RPG	Rebounds per game	APG	Assists per game	SPG	Steals per game
BPG	Blocks per game	PPG	Points per game	**Bold**	Career high

=== Season-by-season averages ===
Year	Team	GP	MPG	FG%	3P%	FT%	RPG	APG	SPG	BPG	PPG
2004–05	Purefoods	62	14.9	.448	.309	.744	1.7	1.0	.3	.1	6.2
2005–06	Purefoods	28	9.6	.383	.258	.805	1.0	.4	.2	0	4.4
2006–07	Purefoods	39	21.6	.476	.443	.798	3.1	1.1	.4	.1	12.4
2007–08	Purefoods	50	22.7	.470	.304	.737	2.5	.8	.5	.1	13.4
2008–09	Purefoods	27	24.7	.498	.366	.728	2.4	.9	.4	.1	14.5
2009–10	Purefoods / B-Meg Derby Ace	52	13.4	.399	.333	.698	1.2	.8	.1	.1	5.6
2010–11	B-Meg Derby Ace	42	**31.6**	.506	.372	.771	3.4	**1.6**	.4	.1	**17.1**
2011–12	B-Meg	58	30.6	.479	.323	.733	**3.9**	1.5	**.6**	**.3**	12.0
2012–13	San Mig Coffee	64	28.0	.463	.321	.767	3.4	1.3	.3	.1	12.8
2013–14	San Mig Super Coffee	**66**	28.4	.479	.358	.722	3.4	**1.6**	.4	.1	13.5
2014–15	Purefoods / Star	41	21.5	.489	.377	.765	2.1	.7	.3	.0	9.9
2015–16	Star	36	26.0	.466	**.454**	.783	2.3	1.2	.3	.1	12.7
2016–17	Star	46	12.9	.426	.340	.778	1.5	.9	.1	.1	5.9
2017–18	Magnolia	49	10.8	.430	.425	.691	1.1	.4	.2	.0	5.9
2019	Magnolia	26	6.9	.413	.297	**.889**	.7	.4	.1	.0	3.1
2020	Magnolia	1	11.4	**.667**	—	—	.0	.0	.0	.0	4.0
Career		687	21.0	.467	.357	.753	2.4	1.0	.3	.1	10.1
