= Mark Barroca =

Filipino basketball player (born 1986)

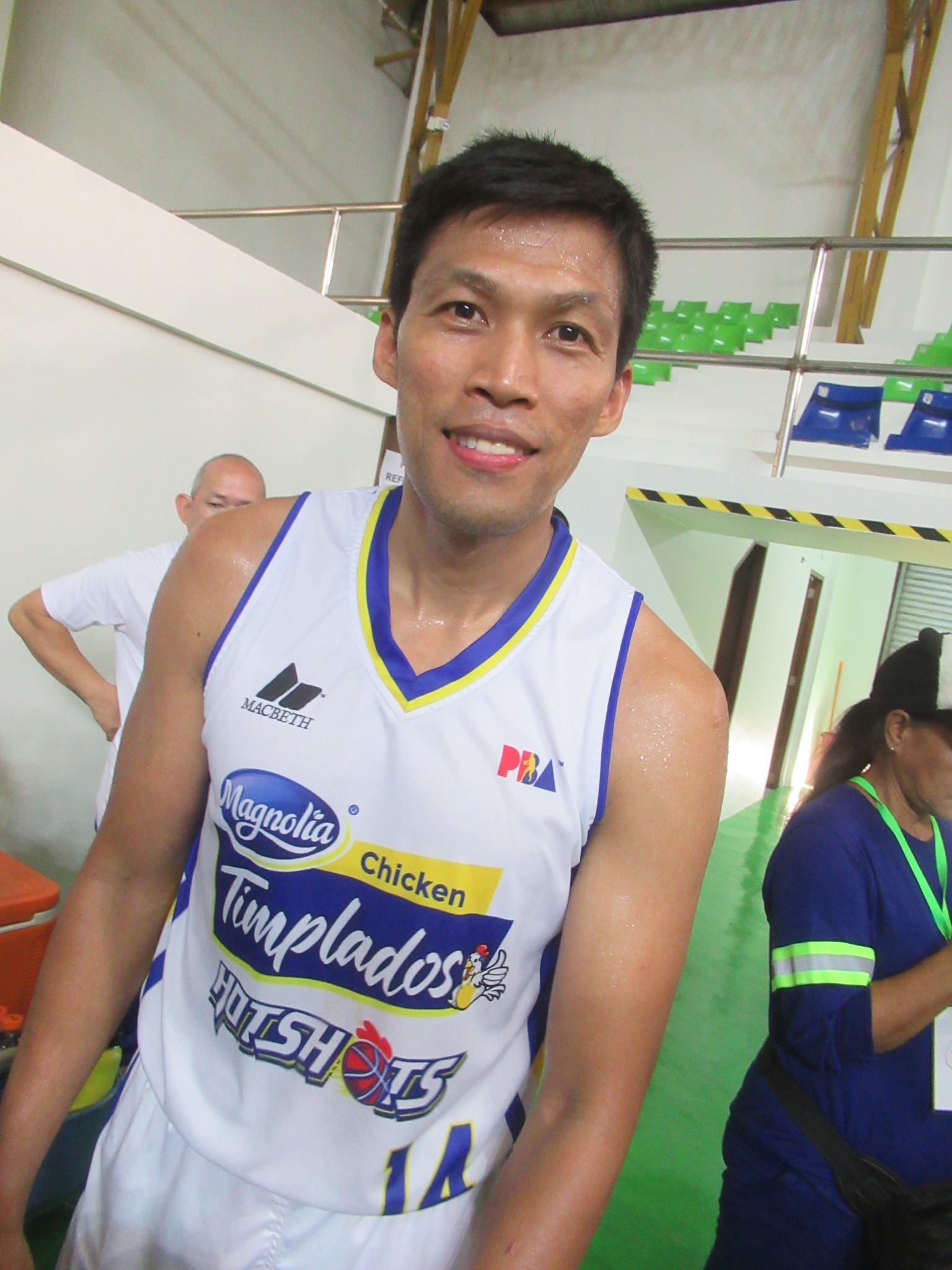

No. 14 – Magnolia Chicken Timplados Hotshots
- Position: Point guard
- League: PBA

Personal information
- Born: April 25, 1986 (age 40) Zamboanga City, Philippines
- Listed height: 5 ft 10 in (1.78 m)
- Listed weight: 170 lb (77 kg)

Career information
- College: FEU
- PBA draft: 2011: 1st round, 5th overall pick
- Drafted by: Shopinas.com Clickers
- Playing career: 2011–present

Career history
- 2011–present: Magnolia Chicken Timplados Hotshots

Career highlights
- 6× PBA champion (2012 Commissioner's, 2013 Governors', 2013–14 Philippine, 2014 Commissioner's, 2014 Governors', 2018 Governors'); 2× PBA Finals Most Valuable Player (2013–14 Philippine, 2018 Governors'); 9× PBA All-Star (2012, 2014–2019, 2023, 2024); PBA Mythical First Team (2014); PBA Mythical Second Team (2018); 2× PBA All-Defensive Team (2014, 2020); PBA Order of Merit (2014); PBA Obstacle Challenge Champion (2014); PBL champion (2008-09 PG Flex Linoleum); PBL Finals MVP (2008-09 PG Flex Linoleum)

Andy Mark C. Barroca (born April 25, 1986) is a Filipino professional basketball player for the Magnolia Chicken Timplados Hotshots of the Philippine Basketball Association (PBA). He currently wears the number 14.

== Professional career ==
Barroca, along with 33 other rookies led by Smart Gilas teammates JVee Casio, Chris Lutz, Marcio Lassiter, Mac Baracael, Jason Ballesteros, and Dylan Ababou applied for the 2011 PBA draft. On draft day, he was taken 5th overall by the Shopinas.com Clickers, who immediately dealt him to the B-Meg Llamados in a three-team trade that also involved the Llamados' Don Allado and fellow rookie draftee Brian Ilad, and the Barako Bull's Elmer Espiritu.

During his rookie season, he did not spend a lot of time on the floor with guards like Roger Yap, Josh Urbiztondo, and Jonas Villanueva all leading the Llamados. Averaging just 17 minutes per game, he was learning from the likes of Johnny Abarrientos and Olsen Racela, now serving as Tim Cone's assistant coaches who are both considered among the greatest backcourt generals in the PBA. He claimed his first PBA championship with the Denzel Bowles-powered B-Meg during the 2012 PBA Commissioner's Cup.

His fortunes would change when those three veteran point guards left the team. Yap was released, then Urbiztondo and Villanueva were dealt to Barako Bull. That paved the way for Barroca to earn the starting point guard spot in his sophomore season. As the main playmaker of the team, he led the Llamados (now playing as San Mig Coffee Mixers) to win the 2013 PBA Governor's Cup at the expense of the Petron Blaze Boosters.

Barroca played close to 34 minutes of average per game in the 2013–14 PBA Philippine Cup and evolved into a clutch player down the stretch. He led the Mixers to their 11th championship by winning the 2013–14 PBA Philippine Cup, at the expense of Rain or Shine Elasto Painters. Because of his efforts, he was awarded as the PBA Press Corps-Papa John's Pizza Finals MVP.

During the 2014 PBA All-Star Weekend, he added another highlight to his breakout year by winning the Obstacle Challenge, dethroning fellow FEU alumnus and Air21 point guard Jonas Villanueva.

In the 2018 Governors' Cup Finals, Barroca averaged 11.0 points per game, 3.2 rebounds per game, 3.2 assists per game and 1.8 steals per game as the Magnolia Hotshots won the finals series against the Alaska Aces.

On July 24, 2022, in a 98–89 victory over the NLEX Road Warriors, Barroca scored 24 points as he became the 94th player (90th local player) in PBA History to record 5,000 career points.

== PBA career statistics ==
Legend
GP	Games played	MPG	Minutes per game	FG%	Field-goal percentage
3FG%	3-point field-goal percentage	4P%	4-point field-goal percentage	FT%	Free-throw percentage
RPG	Rebounds per game	APG	Assists per game	SPG	Steals per game
BPG	Blocks per game	PPG	Points per game	127	Career high

As of the end of 2025–26 season

=== Season-by-season averages ===
Year	Team	GP	MPG	FG%	3P%	4P%	FT%	RPG	APG	SPG	BPG	PPG
2011–12	B-Meg	62	17.4	.402	.277	—	.744	2.3	1.1	.7	.2	5.4
2012–13	San Mig Coffee	64	29.2	.404	.302	—	.729	3.7	3.5	1.4	.1	8.7
2013–14	San Mig Super Coffee	71	30.6	.396	.233	—	.746	3.8	3.3	1.6	.4	10.7
2014–15	Purefoods / Star	45	28.5	.420	.343	—	.766	4.2	2.6	1.2	.1	10.4
2015–16	Star	36	31.0	.401	.356	—	.782	4.5	3.9	1.2	.2	10.2
2016–17	Star	52	27.2	.382	.258	—	.646	3.1	3.4	1.6	.2	9.1
2017–18	Magnolia	57	30.9	.403	.327	—	.737	3.5	3.9	1.9	.2	11.8
2019	Magnolia	53	31.6	.382	.347	—	.714	3.5	3.6	1.4	.2	11.7
2020	Magnolia	12	29.4	.398	.256	—	.714	3.5	4.8	2.3	.1	11.1
2021	Magnolia	41	30.8	.442	.319	—	.797	3.6	5.0	1.2	.1	11.2
2022–23	Magnolia	49	29.7	.422	.276	—	.796	3.0	4.6	1.6	.0	12.0
2023–24	Magnolia	34	30.8	.430	.275	—	.761	3.3	4.7	1.4	.1	14.0
2024–25	Magnolia	42	29.7	.430	.276	.071	.813	3.5	6.1	1.5	.1	10.8
2025–26	Magnolia	39	26.0	.476	.341	.000	.778	3.6	4.8	.7	.0	9.3
Career		657	28.5	.411	.303	.063	.751	3.5	3.8	1.4	.2	10.2

== International career ==
Barroca went on to become part of Rajko Toroman's Smart Gilas Pilipinas national basketball team in 2009, together with his other teammates from FEU, Mac Baracael and Aldrech Ramos. He immediately showcased what he was capable of doing of, scoring 36 points in an exhibition game against PBA's Burger King. When Smart Gilas participated in the 2011 PBA Commissioner's Cup where the team finished in second place after the elimination round, he averaged 8.2 points and 2.7 assists in 17.2 minutes of play.

Along with other amateur athletes, he went all over the globe, training in several camps in Serbia, Australia, United States, and Dubai while playing in tournaments like the Asian Games, FIBA Asia Champions Cup, FIBA Asia Stankovic Cup, Dubai International Basketball Tournament, and the 2011 FIBA Asia Championship in Wuhan, China that culminated his 3-year stay with Smart Gilas.

== Personal life ==
Barroca is married to Ruselle Ann Alinea, and has one daughter, named Natalie Faith. As of 2014, Barroca carried the number 14 in honor of her. Their story was featured in an episode of Kapuso Mo, Jessica Soho.

He idolizes Manny Pacquiao and even played with him in a friendly basketball game during his visit to Pacquiao's mansion in General Santos.
