= 2014 PBA All-Star Weekend =

Gilas Pilipinas	PBA All-Stars
101	93
	1	2	3	4	Total
Gilas Pilipinas	28	21	33	19	101
PBA All-Stars	23	19	22	29	93
- Date: April 4–6, 2014
- Venue: Mall of Asia Arena, Pasay
- MVP: Gary David
- Attendance: N/A
- Network: TV5; AksyonTV; Fox Sports

The 2014 PBA All-Star Weekend was the annual all-star weekend of the Philippine Basketball Association (PBA)'s 2013–14 season. The events were held at the Mall of Asia Arena in Pasay.

== Friday events ==
=== Obstacle Challenge ===
Time in seconds.

Name	Team	First round	Championship
Mark Barroca	San Mig Super Coffee	31.4	29.8
Jonas Villanueva	Air21	34.9	36.0
JVee Casio	Alaska	38.3	54.5
Willie Miller	Barako Bull	40.5	
Sol Mercado	San Miguel	41.6	
LA Tenorio	Barangay Ginebra	42.9	
Paul Lee	Rain or Shine	44.0	
Jayson Castro	Talk 'N Text	49.4	
John Wilson	Meralco	54.2	

- Gold represent the current champion.
- Terrence Romeo did not participate in this event.
- Mark Barroca won in this year's Obstacle Challenge.

=== Three-point Shootout ===
Name	Team	First round	Championship
Mark Macapagal	GlobalPort	23	24
Chris Tiu	Rain or Shine	22	22
JVee Casio	Alaska	22	20
Mark Cardona	Air21	18	
Gary David	Meralco	18	
Marcio Lassiter	San Miguel	18	
John Wilson	Meralco	17	
LA Tenorio	Barangay Ginebra	17	
Ronjay Buenafe	Barako Bull	14	
Larry Fonacier	Talk 'N Text	12	

- Gold represent the current champion.
- LA Tenorio replaced Mac Baracael, who did not participate in this event.
- John Wilson replaced James Yap, who did not participate in this event.
- Mark Macapagal won in this event, making this his fourth title.

=== Slamdunk Contest ===
Name	Team	First round	Second round	Championship
Rey Guevarra	Meralco	40	40	40 (40)
Justin Melton	San Mig Super Coffee	40	40	40 (40)
Chris Ellis	Barangay Ginebra	37	33	
Calvin Abueva	Alaska	32	36	
Japeth Aguilar	Barangay Ginebra	36	29	
Cliff Hodge	Meralco	36	20	
Alex Nuyles	Rain or Shine	36	20	

- Gold represents the current champion.
- Alex Nuyles replaced Arwind Santos in this event.
- Justin Melton and Rey Guevarra are co-champions for this event.
- The scores in the parentheses were for the first round.

=== Greats vs. Stalwarts ===
==== Rosters ====
Team Greats
Player	Team
JVee Casio	Alaska
Rey Guevarra	Meralco
Cliff Hodge	Meralco
Willie Miller	Barako Bull
Terrence Romeo ^{INJ}	GlobalPort
Jonas Villanueva	Air21
Freddie Abuda	Legends
Vergel Meneses ^{1}	Legends
Franz Pumaren	Legends
Johnedel Cardel	Legends
Jason Webb ^{2}	Legends
Topex Robinson ^{REP}	Legends
Head coach: Atoy Co (Legends)

Team Stalwarts
Player	Team
Ronjay Buenafe	Barako Bull
Mark Cardona	Air21
Jervy Cruz ^{3}	Rain or Shine
Sol Mercado	San Miguel
Chris Tiu	Rain or Shine
John Wilson	Meralco
Jeffrey Cariaso	Legends
Bal David ^{4}	Legends
Noli Locsin	Legends
Dickie Bachmann	Legends
Richard del Rosario	Legends
Justin Melton^{REP}	San Mig Super Coffee
Head coach: Bogs Adornado (Legends)

^1 Vergel Meneses was unable to participate.
^2 Jason Webb was unable to participate.
^3 Jervy Cruz was unable to participate.
^4 Bal David was unable to participate.
^INJ Vergel Meneses was unable to participate due to injury.
^REP Topex Robinson was Terrence Romeo's replacement.
^REP Justin Melton was Jervy Cruz's replacement.

==== Game ====
AksyonTV

April 4

Team Greats 136, Team Stalwarts 136
Scoring by quarter: 26–20, 31–37, 44–37, 35–42
Pts: Guevarra 34, Hodge 29, Miller 18, Villanueva 17, Cardel 12, Abuda 11, Casio 9, Robinson 6, Pumaren 0, Co 0, Romeo 0	Pts: Cardona 31, Buenafe 22, Melton 21, Wilson 18, Locsin 18, Mercado 8, Del Rosario 5, Adornado 0, Bachmann 0, Cariaso 0

Mall of Asia Arena, Pasay

- Rey Guevarra was named the MVP for this game.

== Sunday events ==
=== All-Star Game ===
==== Roster ====
Gilas Pilipinas
Pos	Player	Team
Starters
G	LA Tenorio	Ginebra
G	Jeffrei Chan	Rain or Shine
F	Gabe Norwood	Rain or Shine
F	Ranidel de Ocampo	Talk 'N Text
C	Marcus Douthit	none
Reserves
G	Jimmy Alapag	Talk 'N Text
G	Paul Lee	Rain or Shine
G	Jayson Castro	Talk 'N Text
G	Gary David	Meralco
G	Larry Fonacier	Talk 'N Text
G/F	Jared Dillinger	Meralco
F	Beau Belga	Rain or Shine
F	Marc Pingris	San Mig Super Coffee
F/C	Japeth Aguilar	Barangay Ginebra
F/C	June Mar Fajardo	San Miguel
Head coach: Chot Reyes (National Team Coach)

PBA All-Stars
Pos	Player	Team	No. of selections	Votes
Starters
G	Mark Barroca	San Mig Super Coffee	2	38,268
G	James Yap	San Mig Super Coffee	11	38,260
F	Mac Baracael	Barangay Ginebra	2	33,756
F	Chris Ellis	Barangay Ginebra	2	44,630
C	Greg Slaughter	Barangay Ginebra	1	61,680
Reserves
G	Marcio Lassiter	San Miguel	3	—
G	Peter June Simon	San Mig Super Coffee	4	—
F	Calvin Abueva	Alaska	2	—
F	Niño Canaleta	Talk 'N Text	5	—
F	Joe Devance	San Mig Super Coffee	3	—
F	Arwind Santos	San Miguel	7	—
C	Sonny Thoss	Alaska	1	—
Head coach: Tim Cone (San Mig Super Coffee)

==== Game ====
Sports5 on TV5

April 6

boxscore

Gilas Pilipinas 101, PBA All-Stars 93
Scoring by quarter: 28–23, 21–19, 33–22, 19–29
Pts: Chan 17, David 15, Fajardo 13, Castro 12, Douthit 10, De Ocampo 7, Norwood 7, Aguilar 7, Lee 5, Dillinger 4, Fonacier 3, Pingris 1, Belga 0, Tenorio 0	Pts: Yap 14, Slaughter 10, Simon 9, Santos 9, Barroca 8, Lassiter 8, Thoss 8, Ellis 6, Abueva 6, Devance 6, Baracael 6, Canaleta 3

Mall of Asia Arena, Pasay

- All-Star Game MVP: Gary David (Gilas)

== See also ==
- 2013–14 PBA season
- Philippine Basketball Association
- Philippine Basketball Association All-Star Weekend
