= Chris Pacana =

Filipino basketball player

Personal information
- Born: December 24, 1981 (age 44) West Covina, California
- Listed height: 6 ft 1 in (1.85 m)
- Listed weight: 200 lb (91 kg)

Career information
- College: Concordia; St. Francis
- PBA draft: 2006: 2nd round, 15th overall pick
- Drafted by: Coca-Cola Tigers
- Playing career: 2006–2013
- Position: Point guard

Career history
- 2006–2007: Coca-Cola Tigers
- 2007–2009: Barangay Ginebra Kings
- 2009–2010: Sta. Lucia Realtors
- 2010–2011: Meralco Bolts
- 2012: Westports Malaysia Dragons
- 2012–2013: San Mig Coffee Mixers

Career highlights
- PBA champion (2008 Fiesta)

Ernani Christopher Mendoza Pacana III (born December 24, 1981) is a Filipino former professional basketball player. He was the fifteenth draft pick of the Coca-Cola Tigers in 2006. He played for the Barangay Ginebra Kings from (2007–2009) where he was one of the factors of their championship run in the 2008 PBA Fiesta Conference. He was then signed by the Sta. Lucia Realtors and later the Meralco Bolts.

== College career ==
After acquiring his Filipino passport in 2003, Pacana came over from Concordia University in the Golden State Athletic Conference to play for the St. Francis of Assisi Doves in the National Capital Region Athletic Association (NCRAA). In his only season with them, he led them to a championship over Arellano University and also made the mythical team.

== Professional career ==
=== Coca-Cola Tigers ===
Pacana was drafted 15th overall by the Coca-Cola Tigers in the 2006 PBA Draft. At the start of the 2006–07 Philippine Cup, he was listed as a reserve. When Ronjay Enrile got injured, he was put into the lineup. He broke out by scoring 11 of his 13 points in the first half to help the Tigers win over the Red Bull Barako. He followed that up with eight points, eight rebounds, and five assists in an upset win over the Purefoods Chunkee Giants. Against the Welcoat Dragons, he scored a career-high 18 points as he led them to their third win of the conference.

=== Barangay Ginebra Kings ===
Pacana then joined the Barangay Ginebra Kings. During the 2008 All-Star Weekend, Pacana played for the Sophomores' team in the Blitz game. In the 2008 Fiesta Conference finals, he was given more minutes as star player Ronald Tubid got injured. In Game 4, he had 14 points as Ginebra tied the series. Ginebra went on to win the finals.

=== Sta. Lucia Realtors ===
After the 2008–09 season, Pacana became a free agent and signed with the Sta. Lucia Realtors.

=== Meralco Bolts ===
A few games into the 2010–11 Philippine Cup, Pacana joined the Meralco Bolts.

=== Westports Malaysia Dragons ===
In 2012, Pacana headed overseas to join the Westports Malaysia Dragons. In their first game of the 2012 season, he made his contributions in overtime as they beat the San Miguel Beermen. They started the season 3–0. The Dragons made it to the semifinals that season.

=== San Mig Coffee Mixers ===
After his ABL stint, Pacana returned to the PBA to join the San Mig Coffee Mixers.

On August 16, 2013, Pacana and Wesley Gonzales were traded to the Barako Bull Energy Cola for Allein Maliksi. Although he was on Barako's roster for a season, he didn't play a single game for them.

In 2014, Pacana was among those who were eligible to be drafted during the 2014 PBA expansion draft. He was not selected by both the Blackwater Elite and the Kia Sorento.

== Career statistics ==
Legend
| GP | Games played | MPG | Minutes per game |
| FG% | Field-goal percentage | 3P% | 3-point field-goal percentage | FT% | Free-throw percentage |
| RPG | Rebounds per game | APG | Assists per game | SPG | Steals per game |
| BPG | Blocks per game | PPG | Points per game | **Bold** | Career high |

=== PBA season-by-season averages ===
| Year | Team | GP | MPG | FG% | 3P% | FT% | RPG | APG | SPG | BPG | PPG |
|---|---|---|---|---|---|---|---|---|---|---|---|
| 2006–07 | Coca-Cola | 29 | **15.4** | .365 | **.353** | .654 | **3.1** | **2.2** | .8 | .0 | **5.7** |
| 2007–08 | Barangay Ginebra | **32** | 10.7 | .301 | .100 | .560 | 2.1 | .9 | .6 | **.1** | 2.3 |
| 2008–09 | Barangay Ginebra | 25 | 14.2 | **.372** | .235 | .710 | 3.0 | 1.4 | .8 | **.1** | 3.8 |
| 2009–10 | Sta. Lucia | 18 | 10.6 | .250 | .000 | .591 | 1.7 | 1.1 | .7 | .0 | 1.7 |
| 2010–11 | Meralco | 8 | 13.3 | .318 | — | **.750** | 2.4 | 1.3 | **1.0** | .0 | 2.1 |
| 2012–13 | San Mig Coffee | 9 | 3.6 | .250 | — | — | 1.0 | .4 | .2 | .0 | .2 |
| Career | | 121 | 12.2 | .338 | .218 | .644 | 2.4 | 1.3 | .7 | .0 | 3.2 |

=== ABL ===
| Year | Team | GP | MPG | FG% | 3P% | FT% | RPG | APG | SPG | BPG | PPG |
|---|---|---|---|---|---|---|---|---|---|---|---|
| 2012 | Westports Malaysia Dragons | 21 | 22.0 | .361 | .000 | .730 | 3.7 | 2.1 | .1 | .0 | 4.1 |

== Personal life ==
Pacana was born to Ernani Pacana II and Elizabeth Mendoza-Pacana, full-blooded Filipinos who moved to West Covina, California. During his college years in the Philippines, he lived with his uncle, a guitarist who worked occasionally in Regine Velasquez's back-up band.
