= 2012 PBA Commissioner's Cup finals =

Basketball tournament in the Philippines

Team	Coach	Wins
(3) B-Meg Llamados	Tim Cone	4
(1) Talk 'N Text Tropang Texters	Chot Reyes	3
- Dates: April 23 - May 6, 2012
- MVP: James Yap (B-Meg Llamados)
- Television: AKTV on IBC
- Announcers: See broadcast notes
- Radio network: DZSR

Referees
- Game 1: P. Balao, E. Aquino, R. Yante
- Game 2: A. Herrera, P. Balao, R. Yante
- Game 3: N. Quilinguen, P. Balao, R. Yante
- Game 4: A. Herrera, P. Balao, J. Mariano
- Game 5: E. Aquino, B. Guevarra, N. Quilinguen
- Game 6: N. Quilinguen, P. Balao, S. Pineda
- Game 7: N. Quilinguen, E. Aquino, J. Marabe

PBA Commissioner's Cup finals chronology
- < 2011 2013 >

PBA finals chronology
- < 2011–12 Philippine 2012 Governors' >

The 2012 PBA Commissioner's Cup finals was the best-of-7 championship series of the Philippine Basketball Association (PBA) 2012 Commissioner's Cup, and the conclusion of the conference's playoffs. The Talk 'N Text Tropang Texters and the B-Meg Llamados played for the 105th championship contested by the league.

== Background ==
=== Road to the finals ===
B-Meg		Talk 'N Text
Finished tied for 2nd, 6–3: (0.667)	Elimination round	Finished 1st, 7–2: (0.778)
lost to Barangay Ginebra, 84-93	Tiebreaker	Finished 1st, 7–2: (0.778)
Def. Meralco, 2–1	Quarterfinals	Bye
Def. Barangay Ginebra, 3–1	Semifinals	Def. Barako Bull, 3–2

== Series summary ==
Team	Game 1	Game 2	Game 3	Game 4	Game 5	Game 6	Game 7*	Wins
B-Meg	88	102	91	85	82	82	90	4
Talk 'N Text	82	104	87	100	66	92	84	3
Venue	Araneta	Araneta	Araneta	Araneta	Araneta	Araneta	Araneta

*overtime

=== Game 1 ===
AKTV on IBC

April 23
7:00 p.m.

Report

B-Meg Llamados 88, Talk 'N Text Tropang Texters 82
Scoring by quarter: 25–14, 23–26, 14–27, 26–15
Pts: Bowles 25; Rebs: Bowles 11; Asts: Bowles 3	Pts: Harvey 25; Rebs: Harvey 13; Asts: Alapag 6
B-Meg leads series, 1–0

Smart Araneta Coliseum, Quezon City
Attendance: 13,008
Referees: P. Balao, E. Aquino, R. Yante

=== Game 2 ===
AKTV on IBC

April 25
6:45 p.m.

Report

B-Meg Llamados 102, Talk 'N Text Tropang Texters 104
Scoring by quarter: 16–24, 32–25, 27–24, 27–31
Pts: Bowles 33; Rebs: Bowles 13; Asts: Urbiztondo 7	Pts: Harvey 29; Rebs: Harvey 14; Asts: Alapag, Castro 5
Series tied, 1–1

Smart Araneta Coliseum, Quezon City
Attendance: 11,862
Referees: A.Herrera, P.Balao, R.Yante

=== Game 3 ===
AKTV on IBC

April 27
6:45 p.m.

Report

B-Meg Llamados 91, Talk 'N Text Tropang Texters 87
Scoring by quarter: 19–21, 18–15, 25–28, 29–23
Pts: Bowles 28; Rebs: Bowles 13; Asts: Bowles, Urbiztondo 4	Pts: Harvey, Reyes 21; Rebs: Harvey 14; Asts: Alapag, Castro, Fonacier 2
B-Meg leads series, 2–1

Smart Araneta Coliseum, Quezon City
Attendance: 14,493
Referees: N. Quilinguen, P. Balao, R. Yante

=== Game 4 ===
AKTV on IBC

April 29
6:00 p.m.

Report

B-Meg Llamados 85, Talk 'N Text Tropang Texters 100
Scoring by quarter: 24–25, 11–22, 25–26, 25–27
Pts: Bowles, Devance 17; Rebs: Bowles 9 Asts: Bowles 6	Pts: Dillinger, Fonacier 18; Rebs: Harvey 14; Asts: Dillinger 4
Series tied, 2–2

Smart Araneta Coliseum, Quezon City
Attendance: 18,696
Referees: A. Herrera, P. Balao, J. Mariano

=== Game 5 ===
AKTV on IBC

May 2
6:45 p.m.

Report

B-Meg Llamados 82, Talk 'N Text Tropang Texters 66
Scoring by quarter: 24–15, 17–18, 18–20, 23–13
Pts: Yap 30; Rebs: Bowles 18; Asts: Urbiztondo 3	Pts: Dillinger 18; Rebs: Harvey 16; Asts: Harvey 5
B-Meg leads series, 3–2

Smart Araneta Coliseum, Quezon City
Attendance: 15,183
Referees: E.Aquino, B.Guevarra, N.Quilinguen

=== Game 6 ===
AKTV on IBC

May 4
6:45 p.m.

Report

B-Meg Llamados 82, Talk 'N Text Tropang Texters 92
Scoring by quarter: 27–19, 21–31, 15–17, 19–25
Pts: Bowles 33; Rebs: Bowles 12; Asts: Barroca, Intal, Urbiztondo 2	Pts: Castro 25; Rebs: Harvey 17; Asts: Castro 4
Series tied, 3–3

Smart Araneta Coliseum, Quezon City
Attendance: 20,524
Referees: N.Quilinguen, P.Balao, S.Pineda

=== Game 7 ===
AKTV on IBC

May 6
6:00 p.m.

Report

B-Meg Llamados 90, Talk 'N Text Tropang Texters 84 (OT)
Scoring by quarter: 18–21, 17–13, 26–22, 15–20, Overtime: 14–8
Pts: Bowles 39; Rebs: Bowles 21; Asts: Urbiztondo 4	Pts: Alapag 29; Rebs: Harvey 15; Asts: Castro 4
B-Meg wins series, 4–3

Smart Araneta Coliseum, Quezon City
Attendance: 21,046
Referees: N.Quilinguen, E.Aquino, J.Marabe

== Rosters ==
B-Meg Llamados roster
Players

Pos.	#	POB	Name	Height	Weight	DOB (YYYY–MM–DD)	From
PG	2	(United States)	Urbiztondo, Joshua	6 ft 1 in (1.85 m)	185 lb (84 kg)		Fresno Pacific
G	3	(Philippines)	Jonas Villanueva	5 ft 11 in (1.80 m)	170 lb (77 kg)		Far Eastern
C	4	(United States)	Rafi Reavis (C)	6 ft 8 in (2.03 m)	205 lb (93 kg)		Coppin State
G/F	6	(Philippines)	Val Acuña	6 ft 4 in (1.93 m)	179 lb (81 kg)		UE
SF	7	(Philippines)	JC Intal	6 ft 4 in (1.93 m)	195 lb (88 kg)		Ateneo
G	8	(Philippines)	Peter June Simon	6 ft 1 in (1.85 m)	180 lb (82 kg)		Mindanao
PG	14	(Philippines)	Mark Barroca (R)	5 ft 10 in (1.78 m)	170 lb (77 kg)		Far Eastern
F	15	(Philippines)	Marc Pingris	6 ft 6 in (1.98 m)	210 lb (95 kg)		PSBA
G/F	18	(Philippines)	James Yap	6 ft 3 in (1.91 m)	205 lb (93 kg)		UE
PF	19	(Philippines)	Jerwin Gaco	6 ft 4 in (1.93 m)	180 lb (82 kg)		De La Salle
C	21	(United States)	Denzel Bowles (I)	6 ft 10 in (2.08 m)	255 lb (116 kg)		James Madison
F	38	(United States)	Joe Devance	6 ft 7 in (2.01 m)	215 lb (98 kg)		UTEP
PF	63	(Switzerland)	Mike Burtscher	6 ft 6 in (1.98 m)	210 lb (95 kg)		Clearwater Christian
F/C	95	(Philippines)	Yancy De Ocampo	6 ft 9 in (2.06 m)	220 lb (100 kg)		Saint Francis of Assisi

Coaches

Head coach

- (United States) Tim Cone

Assistant coach(es)

- (Philippines) Richard del Rosario (La Salle)
- (Philippines) Koy Banal (Mapúa)
- (Philippines) Johnny Abarrientos (Far Eastern)
- (United States) Jeffrey Cariaso (Sonoma State)
- (Philippines) Dayong Mendoza

Legend

- (C) Team captain
- Injured

Talk 'N Text Tropang Texters roster
Players
Coaches

Pos.	#	POB	Name	Height	Weight	DOB (YYYY–MM–DD)	From
F/C	1	(United States)	Donnell Harvey (I)	6 ft 8 in (2.03 m)	220 lb (100 kg)		Florida
PG	3	(United States)	Jimmy Alapag (C)	5 ft 11 in (1.80 m)	160 lb (73 kg)		Cal State San Bernardino
PF	4	(United States)	Harvey Carey	6 ft 3 in (1.91 m)	210 lb (95 kg)		Sonoma State
G/F	6	(Philippines)	Riego Gamalinda	6 ft 3 in (1.91 m)	184 lb (83 kg)		San Beda
G	10	(United States)	Ryan Reyes	6 ft 1 in (1.85 m)	190 lb (86 kg)		Cal State Fullerton
G/F	12	(Philippines)	Larry Fonacier	6 ft 2 in (1.88 m)	170 lb (77 kg)		Ateneo
PG	16	(Philippines)	John Raymundo (R)	5 ft 10 in (1.78 m)	170 lb (77 kg)		San Sebastian
G	17	(Philippines)	Jayson Castro	5 ft 11 in (1.80 m)	167 lb (76 kg)		Philippine Christian
C	18	(Philippines)	Gilbert Lao	6 ft 7 in (2.01 m)	210 lb (95 kg)		UST
G/F	20	(United States)	Jared Dillinger	6 ft 5 in (1.96 m)	220 lb (100 kg)		Hawaiʻi
F	21	(United States)	Kelly Williams	6 ft 7 in (2.01 m)	215 lb (98 kg)		Oakland
F	33	(Philippines)	Ranidel De Ocampo	6 ft 6 in (1.98 m)	200 lb (91 kg)		Saint Francis of Assisi
F/C	34	(United States)	Ali Peek	6 ft 3 in (1.91 m)	240 lb (109 kg)		Saint Mary's
F/C	35	(Philippines)	Japeth Aguilar	6 ft 9 in (2.06 m)	225 lb (102 kg)		Western Kentucky
PF	40	(Japan)	Rich Alvarez	6 ft 4 in (1.93 m)	200 lb (91 kg)		Ateneo

Head coach

- (Philippines) Chot Reyes (Ateneo)

Assistant coach(es)

- (Philippines) Jamike Jarin (Ateneo)
- (Philippines) Nash Racela (Ateneo)
- (Philippines) Joshua Reyes

Legend

- (C) Team captain
- (CI) Commissioner's Cup Import
- (GI) Governors' Cup Import
- (EI) EASL Import
- (DP) Unsigned draft pick
- (FA) Free agent
- (IN) Inactive
- (S) Suspended
- (R) Rookie
- Injured

== Broadcast notes ==
Game	Play-by-play	Analyst	Courtside reporters	AKTV Center Analysts
Game 1	Magoo Marjon	Quinito Henson and Yeng Guiao	Nikko Ramos and Sel Guevara	Mico Halili, Jason Webb and Jojo Lastimosa
Game 2	Mico Halili	Dominic Uy and Ryan Gregorio	Nikko Ramos and Erika Padilla	Magoo Marjon, Rado Dimalibot and Caloy Garcia
Game 3	Magoo Marjon	Quinito Henson and Franz Pumaren	Erika Padilla and Jessica Mendoza	Mico Halili, Rado Dimalibot and Gary David
Game 4	Mico Halili	Quinito Henson and Ryan Gregorio	Erika Padilla and Sel Guevara	Aaron Atayde, Magoo Marjon, Ronnie Magsanoc and Benjie Paras
Game 5	Magoo Marjon	Dominic Uy and Jojo Lastimosa	Sel Guevara and Jessica Mendoza	Mico Halili, Rado Dimalibot and Jong Uichico
Game 6	Mico Halili	Quinito Henson and Yeng Guiao	Sel Guevara and Jessica Mendoza	Magoo Marjon, Rado Dimalibot and Ronnie Magsanoc
Game 7	Mico Halili	Quinito Henson and Jojo Lastimosa	Sel Guevara and Jessica Mendoza	Magoo Marjon, Rado Dimalibot, Dominic Uy and Benjie Paras

- Additional Game 7 crew:
  - Trophy presentation: Aaron Atayde
  - Dugout interviewer: Erika Padilla
