= Jonas Villanueva =

Filipino basketball player (born 1983)

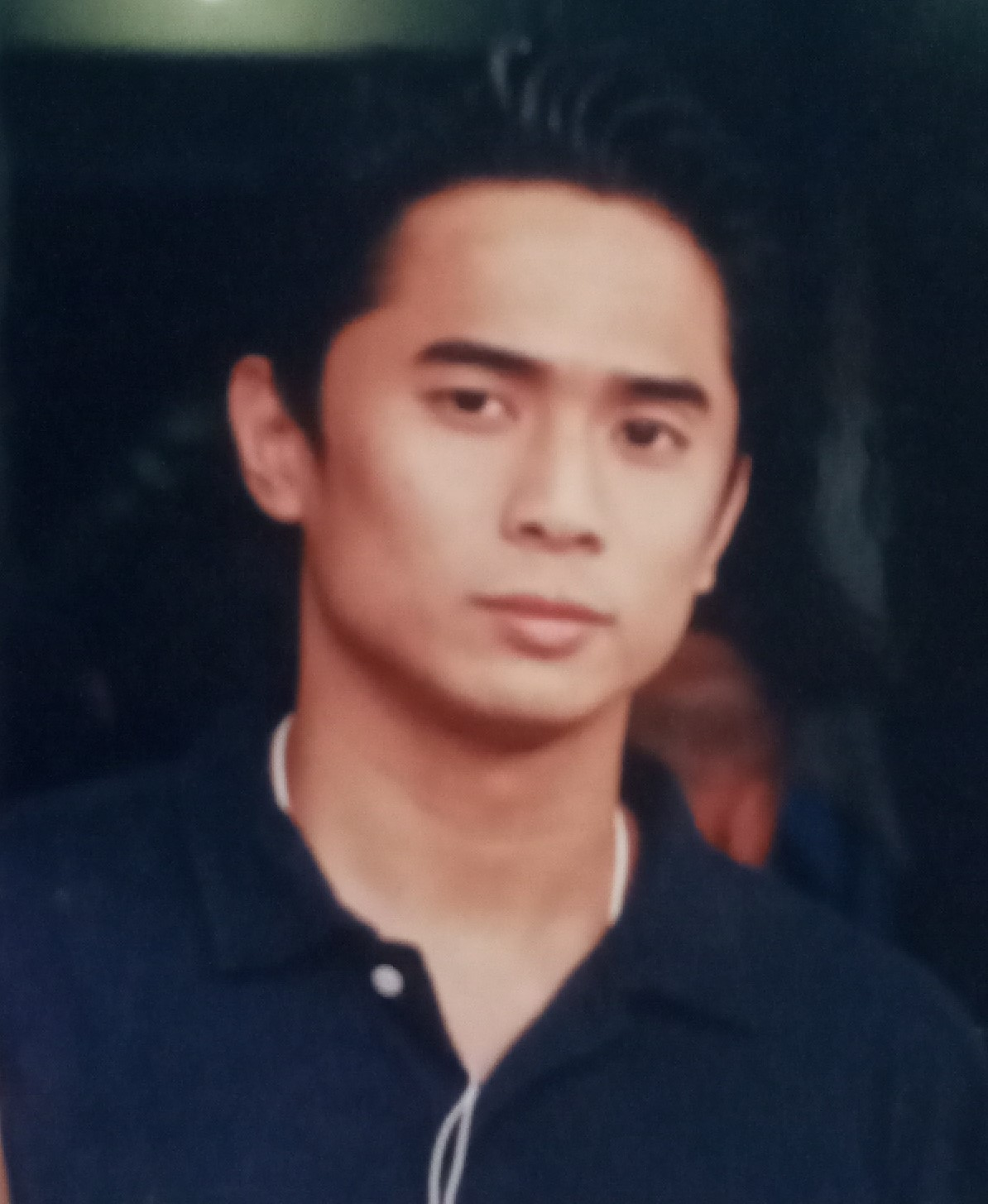
- Jonas Villanueva in 2005

Personal information
- Born: March 31, 1983 (age 43) Bocaue, Bulacan, Philippines
- Listed height: 6 ft 0 in (1.83 m)
- Listed weight: 170 lb (77 kg)

Career information
- College: FEU
- PBA draft: 2007: 1st round, 9th overall pick
- Drafted by: Magnolia Beverage Masters
- Playing career: 2007–2017
- Position: Point guard / shooting guard
- Coaching career: 2019–2020

Career history

Playing
- 2007–2010: Magnolia Beverage Masters / San Miguel Beermen
- 2010–2013: B-Meg Derby Ace Llamados / B-Meg Llamados / San Mig Coffee Mixers
- 2013–2014: Barako Bull Energy
- 2014: Air21 Express
- 2014–2017: NLEX Road Warriors

Coaching
- 2019–2020: Bataan Risers

Career highlights
- 2× PBA champion (2009 Fiesta, 2012 Commissioner's); PBA Finals MVP (2009 Fiesta); PBA Most Improved Player (2009); 4× PBA Obstacle challenge Champion (2010–2013); UAAP champion (2005)

Jonas Victolero Villanueva (born March 31, 1983) is a Filipino former professional basketball player and coach. Villanueva played 12 seasons in the Philippine Basketball Association (PBA). He also coached the Bataan Risers of the Maharlika Pilipinas Basketball League (MPBL).

== College career ==
Born in Bocaue, Bulacan, Villanueva played college basketball for the FEU Tamaraws in which he helped them claim the UAAP Men's Basketball Championship in its 68th season alongside Mark Isip, R.J. Rizada, Jeffrei Chan and former San Miguel teammate Arwind Santos. In that season, he took over the starting point guard role previously held by Denok Miranda. He was eligible for UAAP Rookie of the Year, but he lost the award to Ateneo's Jai Reyes.

The next season, the Tamaraws lost their best players in Santos and Isip due to graduation. As a result, they lost their first four games of the season. They finally got their first win of the season by beating the UP Maroons, in which Villanueva and Chan combined for 48 points. They went on to win three more straight. Despite their efforts, the Tamaraws failed to make the Final Four.

== Professional career ==
=== Magnolia Beverage Masters / San Miguel Beermen ===
Villanueva was selected 9th overall during the 2007 PBA draft by the San Miguel Beermen. He struggled as he played a backup role under longtime veteran Olsen Racela. The following season, he was promoted as the team's starting point guard when former no. 1 draft pick Mike Cortez fell into a season-ending ACL injury and Racela's game started to fade away. He dished out a career-high 27 points in a 93–89 victory over the Alaska Aces then came back with a 16-point performance in a 114–105 win over previously unbeaten Burger King Titans to cop the Player of the Week honors. He won the Fern-C Finals MVP honor after winning the 2009 PBA Fiesta Conference Championship with San Miguel, in which he averaged 11 points, 3.9 rebounds and 3.6 assists in the series. In the 2008–09 PBA season, he was awarded the Most Improved Player award. The following season, he won his first Obstacle Challenge during the 2010 All-Star Weekend.

=== B-Meg / San Mig ===
In 2010, Villanueva was traded to the B-Meg Derby Ace Llamados for Paul Artadi. He missed several games in his first season with B-Meg due to an ankle injury. He became the third player that season to win back-to-back Obstacle Challenges after Rob Johnson and Willie Miller.

The 2011–12 season saw Villanueva win his first PBA championship by beating the Talk 'N Text Tropnag Texters in the 2012 Commissioner's Cup finals. He also won his third straight Obstacle Challenge that season. During the 2012 Governors' Cup, he helped B-Meg fight for an automatic finals berth, which they eventually lost to the Rain or Shine Elasto Painters. They still made the finals that conference by beating Ginebra in the playoffs. In the finals, they were down in the series, but he and PJ Simon forced a Game 7 by combining to score 27 points. He was not able to contribute in Game 7 and Rain or Shine won its first title in franchise history.

=== Barako Bull Energy ===
In 2013, Villanueva was traded alongside JC Intal to the Barako Bull Energy Cola for Alex Mallari, Leo Najorda and Lester Alvarez. During the 2013 Commissioner's Cup, against the team that traded him, he put up 16 points and five assists, leading Barako to the win. He then defended his Obstacle Challenge title once again, winning it all for the fourth consecutive year. Later that year, he had surgery for a meniscus tear, causing him to be out for a conference.

=== Air21 Express ===
In 2014, Villanueva was traded to the GlobalPort Batang Pier for Leo Najorda, then to the Air21 Express for Bonbon Custodio. That year, he lost the Obstacle Challenge to former San Mig teammate Mark Barroca. In the 2014 Governors' Cup, he led Air21 to the quarterfinals. There they were eliminated by Rain or Shine.

=== NLEX Road Warriors ===
In the offseason, Air21 was bought by Metro Pacific Investments Inc., and they became the NLEX Road Warriors. They gave Villanueva a new contract. In a loss to Alaska during the 2014–15 Philippine Cup, he had 13 points. In the 2015 Commissioner's Cup, he contributed 15 points in an upset win over the Beermen. He tried reclaiming his Obstacle Challenge title that season, but this time lost to Jeric Fortuna. Later that conference, he had 20 points, five assists and four steals in a win over the KIA Carnival, their fifth straight win. That conference, NLEX lost twice to the Meralco Bolts in the quarterfinals. For that season, he had career averages in the rebounds, assists, and steals categories.

In a 2015–16 Philippine Cup win over Meralco, Villanueva contributed 17 points. He then had 20 points against the Beermen and made a three-pointer that sent the game into overtime, but the Road Warriors lost 88–80. In the 2016 Commissioner's Cup, he had 15 points in a loss to the Mahindra Enforcer, then 12 in a win over the Star Hotshots. In the 2016 Governors' Cup, he led the locals with 14 points in a loss to the Beermen. He matched that point total again in a crucial win over GlobalPort. In that conference, they lost in the quarterfinals, this time to the Beermen, despite his 17 points.

In the first game of the 2016–17 season, Villanueva contributed 16 points in a win over Alaska. He then had 11 points and 12 points in back to back losses to the Beermen and to the Hotshots. Before the start of the following season, he was made an unrestricted free agent. Coach Yeng Guiao explained that with the emergence of point guard Kevin Alas and the arrival of Kiefer Ravena from the draft, there was no more room for Villanueva.

== Coaching career ==
In 2019, Villanueva became the head coach of the Bataan Risers in the Chooks-to-go Pilipinas 3x3 league. He was also a reserve player for that team. Later on, he joined Bataan's management group. He also coached its MPBL team during the 2019–20 season. Despite losing half his roster at the start of the season due to new management, he was able to coach the team into a playoff seed. However, they did not make the semis as they lost to the Pampanga Giant Lanterns.

Villanueva also was the head coach for the iWalk Chargers during the 2019 PBA D-League Foundation Cup.

== PBA career statistics ==
Legend
GP	Games played	MPG	Minutes per game
FG%	Field-goal percentage	3P%	3-point field-goal percentage	FT%	Free-throw percentage
RPG	Rebounds per game	APG	Assists per game	SPG	Steals per game
BPG	Blocks per game	PPG	Points per game	**Bold**	Career high

Correct as of September 23, 2016

=== Season-by-season averages ===
Year	Team	GP	MPG	FG%	3P%	FT%	RPG	APG	SPG	BPG	PPG
2007–08	Magnolia	31	10.6	**.493**	**.442**	.682	1.5	1.5	.5	.1	3.4
2008–09	San Miguel	54	23.2	.413	.321	.694	3.3	**4.0**	1.1	**.2**	8.5
2009–10	San Miguel	**55**	21.1	.389	.302	.694	3.2	3.9	.7	.1	5.6
2010–11	B-Meg	33	25.8	.361	.269	.735	3.2	3.3	.9	.1	9.0
2011–12	B-Meg	34	12.7	.367	.382	.667	1.7	1.4	.4	.1	3.7
2012–13	B-Meg / San Mig Coffee / Barako Bull	29	23.5	.322	.246	.652	2.5	3.1	.7	.1	5.6
2013–14	Barako Bull	31	19.5	.338	.282	.588	2.2	2.3	.9	.1	4.5
2014–15	NLEX	36	**31.1**	.380	.288	**.765**	**3.6**	**4.0**	**1.3**	.1	8.7
2015–16	NLEX	35	30.0	.387	.335	.691	2.9	3.0	1.0	.0	**9.9**
Career		338	22.1	.381	.311	.698	2.8	3.1	.8	.1	6.7
