= Joe Devance =

Filipino-American basketball player (born 1982)

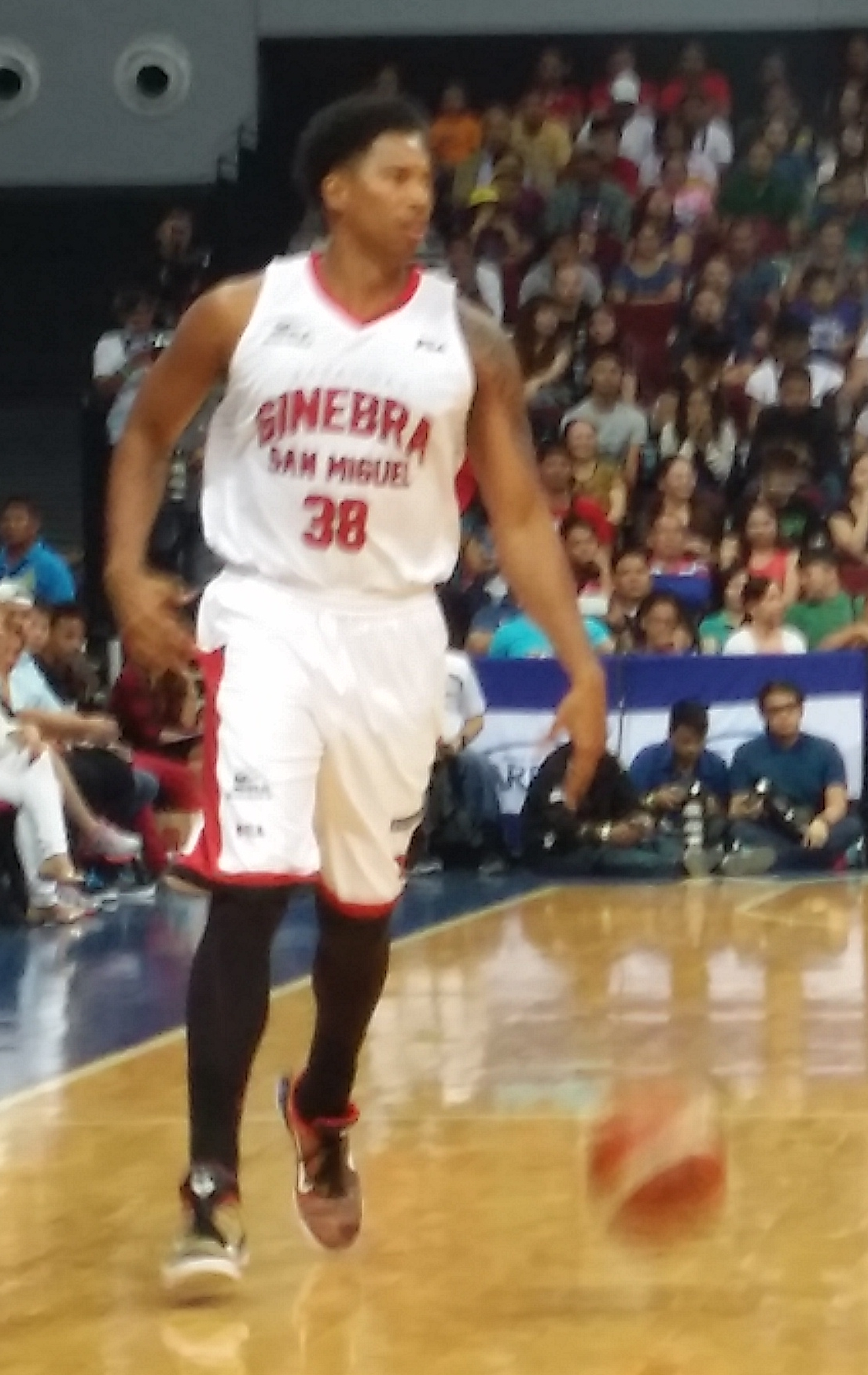
- Devance with the Barangay Ginebra San Miguel in 2015

Personal information
- Born: February 19, 1982 (age 44) Honolulu, Hawaii, U.S.
- Listed height: 6 ft 7 in (2.01 m)
- Listed weight: 225 lb (102 kg)

Career information
- High school: Burges (El Paso, Texas)
- College: UTEP (2001–2004)
- PBA draft: 2007: 1st round1st overall
- Drafted by: Welcoat Dragons
- Playing career: 2007–2022, 2024
- Position: Power forward
- Number: 38

Career history

Playing
- 2007–2008: Welcoat Dragons
- 2008–2011: Alaska Aces
- 2011–2015: Star Hotshots
- 2015–2022, 2024: Barangay Ginebra San Miguel

Coaching
- 2019: Philippines (assistant)

Career highlights
- 12× PBA champion (2010 Fiesta, 2012 Commissioner's, 2013 Governors', 2013–14 Philippine, 2014 Commissioner's, 2014 Governors', 2016 Governors', 2017 Governors', 2018 Commissioner's, 2019 Governors', 2020 Philippine, 2021 Governors'); 8× PBA All-Star (2010, 2011, 2014–2019); 3× PBA Mythical Second Team (2010, 2011, 2017); PBA All-Rookie Team (2008); PBL Most Valuable Player (2006 Unity); PBL Mythical First Team (2006 Unity)
Medals
Men's basketball
Assistant coach for Philippines
Southeast Asian Games
Gold medal – first place	2019 Philippines	Team

Joe Calvin Devance Jr. (born February 19, 1982) is a Filipino-American former professional basketball player. He won 12 championships over the course of his career with the Alaska Aces, the Magnolia franchise and the Barangay Ginebra San Miguel.

== Professional career ==
=== Welcoat Dragons (2007–2008) ===
The forward Devance attended the University of Texas, El Paso between 2001 and 2004. He entered the PBA in 2007 as the first overall pick by then-expansion team Welcoat. Though he had minutes, Devance was not really able to showcase his talent, playing center under coach Caloy Garcia. He wore number 53 with the Dragons.

=== Alaska Aces (2008–2011) ===
After playing one season with the Welcoat Dragons, he was then traded to the Alaska Aces for Sol Mercado. He is a feared outside scorer and a serious threat in the low post, a testament to his offensive capabilities.

Devance and the Aces parted ways after only three seasons as Devance was shipped to the Air21 Express in exchange for the forward Jay-R Reyes.

On his years as an Ace, he was able to reach three finals appearances during the 2008–09 and 2009–10 seasons though he only had a championship during the 2010 Fiesta Conference.

After playing three seasons in the Alaska Aces, Alaska was forced to let go of Devance after the talented Fil-Am forward begged off. Sources said Devance wanted out of Alaska, hoping to get better compensation somewhere else even though Alaska already offered Devance the maximum pay of P350,000 per month. Despite this, Alaska had no choice, so they traded him to Air21 Express for their big man Jay-R Reyes.

=== B-Meg / San Mig Coffee / Purefoods Star / Star (2011–2015) ===
After a week, Devance was quickly traded to the B-Meg Derby Ace Llamados in exchange for Niño Canaleta and Jondan Salvador. Devance was never able to play a game for the Express.

Devance was included in the List of Candidates for the 2010–11 PBA Most Valuable Player Candidates List and led the Statistical Points Average with 31.89 points. In the end of the 2010–11 season, Devance was included in the 2nd Mythical Team along with his teammate James Yap, Jay Washington, Jayson Castro, and Ali Peek. Devance was a key piece in San Mig Coffee's Grand Slam season in the 2013–14 season, averaging 9.4 points per game and 4.3 rebounds per game. Devance signed a 2-year extension deal with the Purefoods Star Hotshots in August 2014.

=== Barangay Ginebra (2015–2022, 2024) ===
On September 28, 2015, Devance was traded to the Barangay Ginebra San Miguel in a series of trades that involved four teams namely: Barangay Ginebra, Star, Barako Bull Energy, and GlobalPort Batang Pier. He again reunited with his former coach at Alaska and Star, Tim Cone.

On June 1, 2022, before the start of the 2022–23 PBA season, Devance announced on Instagram that he will retire from the PBA, Then later he announce that he will join in the coaching staff of the Gin Kings.

In time for the playoffs of 2024 PBA Governors' Cup, Devance was re-activated by Barangay Ginebra after coming out of retirement.

== PBA career statistics ==
Legend
GP	Games played	MPG	Minutes per game	FG%	Field-goal percentage
3FG%	3-point field-goal percentage	4P%	4-point field-goal percentage	FT%	Free-throw percentage
RPG	Rebounds per game	APG	Assists per game	SPG	Steals per game
BPG	Blocks per game	PPG	Points per game	127	Career high

As of the end of 2024–25 season

=== Season-by-season averages ===
Year	Team	GP	MPG	FG%	3P%	4P%	FT%	RPG	APG	SPG	BPG	PPG
2007–08	Welcoat	34	29.2	.408	.291	—	.608	6.5	1.1	.5	.8	13.6
2008–09	Alaska	47	30.2	.460	.350	—	.660	6.3	1.6	.5	.7	13.5
2009–10	Alaska	62	31.0	.454	.299	—	.695	6.1	2.2	.5	.7	12.6
2010–11	Alaska	42	35.7	.445	.363	—	.656	8.4	3.5	.5	1.1	16.5
2010–11	B-Meg Derby Ace	42	35.7	.445	.363	—	.656	8.4	3.5	.5	1.1	16.5
2011–12	B-Meg	38	25.5	.428	.241	—	.720	4.8	2.1	.4	.4	9.1
2012–13	San Mig Coffee	60	30.2	.452	.327	—	.642	5.3	2.6	.5	.8	9.9
2013–14	San Mig Super Coffee	67	30.8	.442	.263	—	.685	4.3	2.3	.7	.5	9.4
2014–15	Purefoods / Star	45	30.9	.451	.323	—	.670	5.1	2.6	.6	.4	10.4
2015–16	Barangay Ginebra	48	20.8	.415	.229	—	.682	3.4	1.9	.2	.2	6.6
2016–17	Barangay Ginebra	60	28.4	.493	.355	—	.654	5.1	3.1	.6	.4	11.4
2017–18	Barangay Ginebra	37	28.6	.475	.350	—	.750	3.8	3.4	.8	.3	10.1
2019	Barangay Ginebra	32	20.4	.339	.272	—	.667	3.2	2.1	.6	.1	4.6
2020	Barangay Ginebra	20	13.6	.444	.133	—	1.000	2.9	1.4	.4	.1	4.2
2021	Barangay Ginebra	18	13.4	.304	.083	—	.615	1.5	1.1	.3	.1	2.4
2024–25	Barangay Ginebra	10	10.3	.476	.000	—	.500	1.2	.8	.5	—	2.1
Career		620	27.6	.445	.304	—	.672	5.0	2.3	.5	.5	10.1
