= 2008–09 PBA season =

34th PBA season

- Duration: October 4, 2008 – July 17, 2009
- Teams: 10
- TV partner(s): C/S9, Basketball TV

2008 PBA Draft
- Top draft pick: Gabe Norwood
- Picked by: Rain or Shine Elasto Painters
- Season MVP: Jayjay Helterbrand (Barangay Ginebra Kings)
- Philippine Cup champions: Talk 'N Text Tropang Texters
- Philippine Cup runners-up: Alaska Aces
- Fiesta Conference champions: San Miguel Beermen
- Fiesta Conference runners-up: Barangay Ginebra Kings

Seasons
- ← 2007–08 2009–10 →

The 2008–09 PBA season was the 34th season of the Philippine Basketball Association. The season formally opened on October 4, 2008 and ended on July 17, 2009. This was the first time that the league will hold their opening ceremonies on a Saturday. The league started the season with the 2008-09 Philippine Cup, or the traditional All-Filipino Conference, while capping off the season with the import-laiden 2009 Fiesta Conference.

The first activity of the season was the 2008 PBA Draft last August 31 at the Market! Market! in Taguig.

== Pre-season events ==
=== Broadcast contracts ===
The 2008-09 season would be the first season under the PBA's new broadcast contract with Solar Sports. Games would now air on their cable channel Basketball TV, and on the stations of the Radio Philippines Network (who curiously, were the first broadcaster of the PBA) after an intense bidding war between Solar and ABS-CBN Corporation.

=== Team re-brandings ===
- The Welcoat Dragons became the Rain or Shine Elasto Painters (their last team name in the Philippine Basketball League).
- The Magnolia Beverage Masters returned to their previous identity as the San Miguel Beermen.
- The Talk 'N Text Phone Pals became the Talk 'N Text Tropang Texters.

=== Major trades ===
- The Alaska Aces traded 6-foot-3 Veteran Forward Eddie Laure and 6-foot-1 Point Guard Solomon Mercado to Rain or Shine Elasto Painters for 6-foot-7 Forward Joe Devance.
- The Air21 Express traded 6-foot-4 Forward Mark Borboran to Alaska Aces in exchange for 6-foot-6 Forward/center J.R. Quiñahan.

== Opening ceremonies ==
The season began on October 4 with the Talk 'N Text Tropang Texters defeating the Coca Cola Tigers, 98-97.

The muses for the participating teams are as follows:

Team	Muse
Air21 Express	Karla Henry
Alaska Aces	Isabelle Daza
Barangay Ginebra Kings	Iwa Moto
Coca-Cola Tigers	Pokwang
Purefoods Tender Juicy Giants	Iya Villania
Rain or Shine Elasto Painters	Priscilla Meirelles
Red Bull Barako	Marianna del Rio
San Miguel Beermen	5 SMB models
Sta. Lucia Realtors	Ariana Barouk
Talk 'N Text Tropang Texters	Rufa Mae Quinto

== 2008-09 Philippine Cup ==
=== Elimination round ===
Pos	Team	W	L	PCT	GB	Qualification
1	Alaska Aces	12	6	.667	—	Advance to semifinals
2	Talk 'N Text Tropang Texters	11	7	.611	1	Advance to semifinals
3	Barangay Ginebra Kings	10	8	.556 (Note: Head-to-head differential: Barangay Ginebra +16, Rain or Shine −3, Sta. Lucia −13)	2	Advance to quarterfinals
4	Rain or Shine Elasto Painters	10	8	.556	2	Advance to quarterfinals
5	Sta. Lucia Realtors	10	8	.556	2	Advance to quarterfinals
6	San Miguel Beermen	9	9	.500	3	Advance to wildcard round
7	Purefoods Tender Juicy Giants	8	10	.444 (Note: Head-to-head record: Purefoods 2–0 Air21)	4	Advance to wildcard round
8	Air21 Express	8	10	.444	4	Advance to wildcard round
9	Coca-Cola Tigers	7	11	.389	5	Advance to wildcard round
10	Red Bull Barako	5	13	.278	7	

Source: PBA.ph

=== Playoffs ===
Wildcard phase (Single elimination)
7	Purefoods	82
8	Air21	94
6	San Miguel	99
9	Coca-Cola	89

Wildcard phase (Single elimination)
8	Air21	86
6	San Miguel	105

Quarterfinals (Best-of-3)
3	Ginebra	1
6	San Miguel	2
4	Rain or Shine	0
5	Sta. Lucia	2

Semifinals (Best-of-7)
2	Talk 'N Text	4
6	San Miguel	2
1	Alaska	4
5	Sta. Lucia	2

Finals (Best-of-7)
2	Talk 'N Text	4
1	Alaska	3
Third place
6	San Miguel	97
5	Sta. Lucia (OT)	99

==== Wildcard phase ====
===== 1st round =====
Team 1	Score	Team 2
(6) San Miguel Beermen	99–89	(9) Coca-Cola Tigers
(7) Purefoods Tender Juicy Giants	82–94	(8) Air21 Express

===== 2nd round =====
Team 1	Score	Team 2
(6) San Miguel Beermen	105–86	(8) Air21 Express

==== Quarterfinals ====
Team 1	Series	Team 2	Game 1	Game 2	Game 3
(3) Barangay Ginebra Kings	1–2	(6) San Miguel Beermen	77–78	91–88	93–98
(4) Rain or Shine Elasto Painters	0–2	(5) Sta. Lucia Realtors	84–101	85–92	—

==== Semifinals ====
Team 1	Series	Team 2	Game 1	Game 2	Game 3	Game 4	Game 5	Game 6	Game 7
(1) Alaska Aces	4–2	(5) Sta. Lucia Realtors	92–76	94–87	65–76	88–93	74–81	87–83	—
(2) Talk 'N Text Tropang Texters	4–2	(6) San Miguel Beermen	129–100	103–112	110–106	106–103	115–125	116–115 (OT)	—

==== Third place playoff ====
Team 1	Score	Team 2
(5) Sta. Lucia Realtors	99–97	(6) San Miguel Beermen

==== Finals ====
Team 1	Series	Team 2	Game 1	Game 2	Game 3	Game 4	Game 5	Game 6	Game 7
(1) Alaska Aces	3–4	(2) Talk 'N Text Tropang Texters	102–95	100–91	73–92	98–100	95–93	94–99	89–93

- Finals MVP: Mark Cardona (Talk 'N Text)
- Best Player of the Conference: Willie Miller (Alaska Aces)

== Smart Gilas exhibition games ==
Exhibition games were held prior to Games 4 and 6 of the Philippine Cup finals between the Smart Gilas (Philippines team that will compete in the FIBA Asia Championship 2011) coached by Rajko Toroman and previously eliminated teams from the Philippine Cup. The games also marked the appearance of the newly renamed Burger King Titans team formerly known as the Air21 Express.

C/S9

February 4

Smart Gilas 95, Burger King Titans 95

Araneta Coliseum, Quezon City

C/S9

February 9

Smart Gilas 81, Rain or Shine Elasto Painters 84

Araneta Coliseum, Quezon City

== 2009 Fiesta Conference ==
=== Notable events ===
- Red Bull Barako changed their name to Barako Bull Energy Boosters.
- The former Air21 Express were renamed as the Burger King Titans. However, with the failure of several business deals that would have changed the franchise's upper management, the Titans renamed into the Burger King Whoppers by their seventh game into the conference, retaining their old management headed by the Lina family.
- The May 16 game between the Barangay Ginebra Kings and the Alaska Aces held at the Albay Astrodome in Legaspi was canceled when the playing court was judged as too slippery, with Ginebra leading 9–2, and 8:04 remaining in the first quarter. The game was stopped twice and the stoppages lasted two hours before the game was canceled. The game was restarted at the Araneta Coliseum on May 22.

=== Classification round ===
Pos	Team	W	L	PCT	GB	Qualification
1	San Miguel Beermen	11	3	.786	—	Advance to semifinals
2	Barangay Ginebra Kings	8	6	.571 (Note: Head-to-head differential: Rain or Shine +15, Barangay Ginebra −7, Burger King −8; second seed playoff: Barangay Ginebra 114–71 Rain or Shine)	3	Advance to semifinals
3	Rain or Shine Elasto Painters	8	6	.571	3	Twice-to-beat in the wildcard round
4	Burger King Whoppers	8	6	.571	3	Twice-to-beat in the wildcard round
5	Sta. Lucia Realtors	7	7	.500 (Note: Head-to-head differential: Sta. Lucia +7, Purefoods +3, Talk 'N Text −10)	4	Knockout in the wildcard round
6	Purefoods Tender Juicy Giants	7	7	.500	4	Knockout in the wildcard round
7	Talk 'N Text Tropang Texters	7	7	.500	4	Knockout in the wildcard round
8	Coca-Cola Tigers	6	8	.429 (Note: Eighth seed playoff: Coca-Cola 81–74 Alaska)	5	Knockout in the wildcard round
9	Alaska Aces	6	8	.429	5	Twice-to-win in the wildcard round
10	Barako Bull Energy Boosters	2	12	.143	9	Twice-to-win in the wildcard round

Source: PBA.ph

=== Playoffs ===
Wildcard phase
(#4 twice-to-beat)
4	Burger King	96
9	Alaska	90
(Single-elimination)
5	Sta. Lucia	94
8	Coca-Cola	88
(#3 twice to beat)
3	Rain or Shine	96
10	Barako Bull	88
(Single-elimination)
6	Purefoods (2OT)	126
7	Talk 'N Text	123

Quarterfinals (Best-of-3)
4	Burger King	2
5	Sta. Lucia	1
3	Rain or Shine	2
6	Purefoods	1

Semifinals (Best-of-7)
1	San Miguel	4
4	Burger King	2
2	Ginebra	4
3	Rain or Shine	2

Finals (Best-of-7)
1	San Miguel	4
2	Ginebra	3
Third place playoff
4	Burger King	132
3	Rain or Shine	118

==== Wildcard phase ====
Team 1	Series	Team 2	Game 1	Game 2
(3) Rain or Shine Elasto Painters*	1–0	(10) Barako Bull Energy Boosters	96–88	—
(4) Burger King Whoppers*	1–0	(9) Alaska Aces	96–90	—

Team 1	Score	Team 2
(5) Sta. Lucia Realtors	94–88	(8) Coca-Cola Tigers
(6) Purefoods Tender Juicy Giants	126–123 (2OT)	(7) Talk 'N Text Tropang Texters

*Team has twice-to-beat advantage. Team #1 only has to win once, while Team #2 has to win twice.

==== Quarterfinals ====
Team 1	Series	Team 2	Game 1	Game 2	Game 3
(3) Rain or Shine Elasto Painters	2–1	(6) Purefoods Tender Juicy Giants	96–87	82–84	93–89
(4) Burger King Whoppers	2–1	(5) Sta. Lucia Realtors	84–93	94–81	120–72

==== Semifinals ====
Team 1	Series	Team 2	Game 1	Game 2	Game 3	Game 4	Game 5	Game 6	Game 7
(1) San Miguel Beermen	4–2	(4) Burger King Whoppers	102–87	113–116	100–88	120–119 (2OT)	90–103	118–103	—
(2) Barangay Ginebra Kings	4–2	(3) Rain or Shine Elasto Painters	95–101	103–98	88–94	86–70	96–85	108–100	—

==== Third place playoff ====
Team 1	Score	Team 2
(3) Rain or Shine Elasto Painters	118–132	(4) Burger King Whoppers

==== Finals ====
Team 1	Series	Team 2	Game 1	Game 2	Game 3	Game 4	Game 5	Game 6	Game 7
(1) San Miguel Beermen	4–3	(2) Barangay Ginebra Kings	96–102	95–78	103–116	106–104	98–106	98–84	90–79

- Finals MVP: Jonas Villanueva (San Miguel)
- Best Player of the Conference: Jayjay Helterbrand (Barangay Ginebra Kings)
- Best Import of the Conference: Gabe Freeman (San Miguel Beermen)

== Philippines-Australia goodwill series ==
An Australian team was invited to a two-game series between the national team, with the winner of a game being awarded P75,000 (about A$4,340).

C/S9

April 3

San Sebastian Staglets	93–88	Ateneo Blue Eaglets

Araneta Coliseum, Quezon City

C/S9

April 3

Powerade-Team Pilipinas	87–63	Motolite-Australia Great White Sharks

Araneta Coliseum, Quezon City

C/S9

April 5

FEU Lady Tamaraws	65–61	UP Lady Maroons

Araneta Coliseum, Quezon City

C/S9

April 5

Powerade-Team Pilipinas	93–89 (OT)	Motolite-Australia Hoopdreamz

Araneta Coliseum, Quezon City

== 2009 PBA All-Star Weekend ==
The 2009 PBA All-Star Weekend was held from April 22 to 26 at three different cities, particularly: Victorias, Negros Occidental (April 22), Panabo, Davao del Norte (April 24), and Quezon City (April 26). The winners were:

- Obstacle Challenge: Paul Artadi (Barangay Ginebra Kings)
- Three-point Shootout: James Yap (Purefoods Tender Juicy Giants)
- Slam Dunk Competition: David Noel (Barangay Ginebra Kings)

=== All-Star Games ===
C/S9

April 22

Powerade-Team Pilipinas 98, North All-Stars 80
Scoring by quarter: 28–23, 24–25, 25–10, 25–22
Pts: Mick Pennisi 15	Pts: Jhamar Thorpe 16

Victorias City Sports and Recreational Arena, Victorias, Negros Occidental

C/S9

April 24

Powerade-Team Pilipinas 103, South All-Stars 99
Scoring by quarter: 28–21, 23–28, 33–13, 19–37
Pts: Jared Dillinger 12	Pts: Peter June Simon 19

Panabo City Tourism, Cultural and Sports Center, Panabo, Davao del Norte

C/S9

April 26
6:30 p.m.

PBA All-Stars 97, Powerade-Team Pilipinas 89
Scoring by quarter: 24-23, 22-23, 25-25, 26-18
Pts: David Noel 18	Pts: Arwind Santos 18

Araneta Coliseum, Quezon City
Attendance: 9,000+

David Noel named the All-Star Game MVP.

== Awards ==
- Most Valuable Player: Jayjay Helterbrand (Barangay Ginebra)
- Rookie of the Year: Gabe Norwood (Rain or Shine)
- First Mythical Team:
  - Jayjay Helterbrand (Brgy. Ginebra)
  - Mark Cardona (Talk 'N Text)
  - Jay Washington (San Miguel)
  - Arwind Santos (Burger King)
  - Asi Taulava (Coca Cola)
- Second Mythical Team:
  - Willie Miller (Alaska)
  - Dondon Hontiveros (San Miguel)
  - Gabe Norwood (Rain or Shine)
  - Jay-R Reyes (Rain or Shine)
  - Kelly Williams (Sta. Lucia)
- All-Defensive Team:
  - Arwind Santos (Burger King)
  - Billy Mamaril (Brgy. Ginebra)
  - Asi Taulava (Coca Cola)
  - Wynne Arboleda (Burger King)
  - Ronald Tubid (Brgy. Ginebra)
- Most Improved Player: Jonas Villanueva (San Miguel)
- Sportsmanship Award: Ryan Reyes (Sta. Lucia)
- Motolite Pangmatagalan Player of the Year: Willie Miller (Alaska)

=== Awards given by the PBA Press Corps ===
- Coach of the Year: Chot Reyes (Talk 'N Text)
- Mr. Quality Minutes: Jayson Castro (Talk 'N Text)
- Comeback Player of the Year: Mike Cortez (San Miguel)
- Executive of the Year: Danding Cojuangco (San Miguel)
- Referee of the Year: Throngy Aldaba
- Player of the Week Order of Merit: Arwind Santos (Burger King) / Jimmy Alapag (Talk 'N Text)
- All-Rookie Team
  - Gabe Norwood (Rain or Shine)
  - Sol Mercado (Rain or Shine)
  - Bonbon Custodio (San Miguel)
  - Jared Dillinger (Talk 'N Text)
  - Larry Rodriguez (Barako Bull)

== Cumulative standings ==
Pos	Team	Pld	W	L	PCT	Best finish
1	San Miguel Beermen	61	36	25	.590	Champions
2	Talk 'N Text Tropang Texters	47	26	21	.553	Champions
3	Barangay Ginebra Kings	49	27	22	.551	Finalist
4	Alaska Aces	46	25	21	.543	Finalist
5	Sta. Lucia Realtors	45	24	21	.533	Third place
6	Rain or Shine Elasto Painters	45	23	22	.511	Semifinalist
7	Burger King Whoppers/Titans/Air21 Express	45	23	22	.511	Third place
8	Purefoods Tender Juicy Giants	37	17	20	.459	Quarterfinalist
9	Coca-Cola Tigers	34	13	21	.382	Wildcard phase
10	Barako Bull Energy Boosters/Red Bull Barako	33	7	26	.212	Wildcard phase

=== Elimination/classification rounds ===
Pos	Team	Pld	W	L	PCT
1	San Miguel Beermen	32	20	12	.625
2	Barangay Ginebra Kings	32	18	14	.563
3	Talk 'N Text Tropang Texters	32	18	14	.563
4	Alaska Aces	32	18	14	.563
5	Rain or Shine Elasto Painters	32	18	14	.563
6	Sta. Lucia Realtors	32	17	15	.531
7	Burger King Whoppers/Titans/Air21 Express	32	16	16	.500
8	Purefoods Tender Juicy Giants	32	15	17	.469
9	Coca-Cola Tigers	32	13	19	.406
10	Barako Bull Energy Boosters/Red Bull Barako	32	7	25	.219

=== Playoffs ===
Pos	Team	Pld	W	L
1	San Miguel Beermen	29	16	13
2	Barangay Ginebra Kings	17	9	8
3	Talk 'N Text Tropang Texters	15	8	7
4	Burger King Whoppers/Titans/Air21 Express	13	7	6
5	Sta. Lucia Realtors	13	7	6
6	Alaska Aces	14	7	7
7	Rain or Shine Elasto Painters	13	5	8
8	Purefoods Tender Juicy Giants	5	2	3
9	Barako Bull Energy Boosters/Red Bull Barako	1	0	1
10	Coca-Cola Tigers	2	0	2
