= Matthew Rogers (basketball) =

American basketball player (born 1987)

Personal information
- Born: December 3, 1987 (age 38) Doniphan, Missouri, U.S.
- Listed height: 6 ft 11 in (2.11 m)
- Listed weight: 225 lb (102 kg)

Career information
- High school: Doniphan (Doniphan, Missouri)
- College: Southwest Baptist (2006–2010)
- NBA draft: 2010: undrafted
- Playing career: 2010–2014
- Position: Center / power forward

Career history
- 2010–2012: Texas Legends
- 2012: Byblos Club
- 2012: Coruña
- 2013: San Mig Super Coffee Mixers
- 2013: San Miguel Beermen
- 2013: Al-Arabi
- 2014: Canterbury Rams

Career highlights
- MIAA Player of the Year (2009); 3× First-team All-MIAA (2008–2010); 2× MIAA Defensive Player of the Year (2008, 2009); 4× MIAA All-Defensive Team (2007–2010)

Matthew Lamar Rogers (born December 3, 1987) is an American former professional basketball player. He played college basketball for Southwest Baptist University before playing professionally in the NBA Development League, Lebanon, Spain, the Philippines, Qatar and New Zealand.

== High school career ==
Rogers attended Doniphan High School in Doniphan, Missouri where he was a two-time second-team All-State selection, as well as a McDonald's All-American nominee.

== College career ==
In his freshman season at Southwest Baptist, Rogers led the league in blocks and earned All-MIAA defensive team honors. In 28 games, he averaged 7.4 points, 5.7 rebounds and 2.9 blocks per game.

In his sophomore season, he finished second overall in blocks with 136 as well as being named in the 2008 All-MIAA first team and defensive team, subsequently also winning the defensive player of the year award. In 30 games, he averaged 14.9 points, 7.8 rebounds, 4.5 blocks and 1.8 assists per game.

In his junior season, he again led the league in blocks with 123 as well as being named in the 2009 All-MIAA first team and defensive team, winning the defensive player of the year award for the second year in a row. In 30 games, he averaged 18.3 points, 8.7 rebounds, 1.5 assists, 4.1 blocks and 1.0 steals per game.

In his senior season, he was named in the 2010 All-MIAA first team and defensive team. He had been averaging 21.8 points, 8.8 rebounds and 3.6 blocks per game before suffering a season-ending right ACL injury in February.

== Professional career ==
=== Texas Legends ===
After going undrafted in the 2010 NBA draft, Rogers signed with the Charlotte Bobcats on September 28. However, he was later waived by the Bobcats on October 21 after appearing in three preseason games. On November 1, he was selected with the fourth overall pick in the 2010 NBA Development League Draft by the Texas Legends. He was the first ever draft pick in Texas Legends history. In 51 games for the Legends in 2010–11, he averaged 7.2 points, 4.2 rebounds and 1.1 blocks per game.

On October 7, 2011, Rogers re-signed with the Legends for the 2011–12 season. On December 10, 2011, he signed with the Indiana Pacers, but was later waived by the team on December 23 after appearing in one preseason game. Two days later, he returned to Texas and continued playing for the Legends until being waived by the team on March 22, 2012. Later that month, he signed with Lebanese team Byblos Club for the rest of the season.

=== Spain and Philippines ===
In July 2012, Rogers joined the Indiana Pacers for the 2012 NBA Summer League.

In September 2012, Rogers signed with Coruña of Spain for the 2012–13 season. In December 2012, he left Coruña after appearing in 11 games for the club. In January 2013, he signed with the San Mig Super Coffee Mixers for the 2013 Commissioner's Cup. He left after appearing in just one game, and the following month, he signed with the San Miguel Beermen. He played two games in ASEAN Basketball League.

On April 5, 2013, Rogers signed with Qatari team Al-Arabi where he spent the rest of the season.

=== New Zealand ===
In January 2014, Rogers signed with the Canterbury Rams for the 2014 New Zealand NBL season. He appeared in all 18 games for the Rams, averaging 16.6 points, 6.1 rebounds, 1.2 assists and a league-leading 2.6 blocks per game.

== Personal ==
Rogers is the son of Wade and LaDonna Rogers. He is married to wife, Rachael.

A devoted Christian, Rogers states religion is a massive part of his life thanks to his father being a pastor.
