= 2012 PBA Commissioner's Cup =

Basketball tournament in Philippines

- Duration: February 10 – May 6, 2012
- TV partner(s): Sports5 - AKTV on IBC (Local); Aksyon TV International (International)

Finals
- Champions: B-Meg Llamados
- Runners-up: Talk 'N Text Tropang Texters

Awards
- Best Player: Mark Caguioa (Barangay Ginebra Kings)
- Best Import: Denzel Bowles (B-Meg Llamados)
- Finals MVP: James Yap (B-Meg Llamados)

PBA Commissioner's Cup chronology
- < 2011 2013 >

PBA conference chronology
- < 2011–12 Philippine 2012 Governors' >

The 2012 Philippine Basketball Association (PBA) Commissioner's Cup was the second conference of the 2011–12 PBA season. The tournament began on February 10 and ended on May 6, 2012. The tournament is an import-laden format, which means that a team may sign an import or a pure-foreign player for each team with no height limit.

== Format ==
The following format was observed for the duration of the conference:

- Single round-robin eliminations; 9 games per team; Teams are then seeded by basis on win–loss records. In case of tie, playoffs will be held only for the #2 and #6 seeds.
- The top two teams after the elimination round will automatically advance to the semifinals.
- The next four teams will play in a best of three quarterfinals series for the two last berths in the semifinals. Matchups are:
  - QF1: #3 team vs. #6 team
  - QF2: #4 team vs. #5 team
- The winners of the quarterfinals will challenge the top two teams in a best-of-five semifinals series. Matchups are:
  - SF1: #1 vs. QF2
  - SF2: #2 vs. QF1
- The winners in the semifinals advance to the best-of-seven finals.

== Elimination round ==
=== Team standings ===
Pos	Team	W	L	PCT	GB	Qualification
1	Talk 'N Text Tropang Texters	7	2	.778	—	Advance to semifinals
2	Barangay Ginebra Kings	6	3	.667 (Note: Second seed playoff: Barangay Ginebra 93–84 B-Meg)	1	Advance to semifinals
3	B-Meg Llamados	6	3	.667	1	Advance to quarterfinals
4	Alaska Aces	5	4	.556	2	Advance to quarterfinals
5	Barako Bull Energy Cola	4	5	.444 (Note: Head-to-head quotient: Barako Bull 1.04, Meralco 1.01, Powerade 0.95; sixth seed playoff: Meralco 102–98 Powerade)	3	Advance to quarterfinals
6	Meralco Bolts	4	5	.444	3	Advance to quarterfinals
7	Powerade Tigers	4	5	.444	3	
8	Rain or Shine Elasto Painters	3	6	.333 (Note: Head-to-head quotient: Rain or Shine 1.12, Petron 1.11, Air21 0.80)	4	
9	Petron Blaze Boosters	3	6	.333	4	
10	Air21 Express	3	6	.333	4	

Source: PBA.ph

=== Schedule ===
Team ╲ Game	1	2	3	4	5	6	7	8	9
Air21	BBE	PBB	BMEG	TNT	ALA	ROS	POW	MER	BGK
Alaska	BBE	ROS	BGK	TNT	MER	A21	PBB	BMEG	POW
B-Meg	MER	BBE	PBB	TNT	A21	BGK	ALA	ROS	POW
Barako Bull	ALA	BMEG	A21	ROS	POW	TNT	MER	PBB	BGK
Barangay Ginebra	PBB	ALA	ROS	POW	MER	BMEG	TNT	BBE	A21
Meralco	BMEG	PBB	TNT	POW	ALA	BGK	ROS	BBE	A21
Petron Blaze	BGK	MER	BMEG	A21	ROS	POW	ALA	BBE	TNT
Powerade	ROS	MER	BBE	BGK	PBB	TNT	A21	ALA	BMEG
Rain or Shine	ALA	POW	BBE	BGK	PBB	MER	A21	BMEG	TNT
Talk 'N Text	MER	ALA	BMEG	A21	BBE	POW	BGK	ROS	PBB

= Win; = OT win; = Loss; = OT loss

=== Results ===
Team	Air21	ALA	BMEG	BBE	BGK	MER	PBB	POW	ROS	TNT
Air21		88–85	79–88	97–88	87–103	91–101	88–102	92–121	83–113	89–78
Alaska	—		75–90	78–98	76–74	98–90	93–88	102–100*	109–102	98–110
B-Meg	—	—		88–86	109–93	96–93	77–84	96–94	95–101	96–102
Barako Bull	—	—	—		81–91	89–82	94–80	101–91	95–99	106–113*
Barangay Ginebra	—	—	—	—		80–89	84–82	105–96	89–88	94–91*
Meralco	—	—	—	—	—		105–83	82–94	93–84	96–102*
Petron Blaze	—	—	—	—	—	—		88–98	110–103	80–107
Powerade	—	—	—	—	—	—	—		122–120	97–111
Rain or Shine	—	—	—	—	—	—	—	—		90–102
Talk 'N Text	—	—	—	—	—	—	—	—	—	

Legend: Blue = left column team win; Red = top row team win.
Matches with lighter background shading were decided after overtime.

== Sixth seed playoff ==
March 30

Meralco Bolts 102, Powerade Tigers 98

Cuneta Astrodome, Pasay

== Second seed playoff ==
March 30

B-Meg Llamados 84, Barangay Ginebra Kings 93

Cuneta Astrodome, Pasay

== Bracket ==
Quarterfinals (Best-of-3)
4	Alaska	1
5	Barako Bull	2
3	B-Meg	2
6	Meralco	1

Semifinals (Best-of-5)
1	Talk 'N Text	3
5	Barako Bull	2
2	Barangay Ginebra	1
3	B-Meg	3

Finals (Best-of-7)
1	Talk 'N Text	3
3	B-Meg	4

== Quarterfinals ==
=== (3) B-Meg vs. (6) Meralco ===
April 1

B-Meg Llamados 81, Meralco Bolts 103

Smart Araneta Coliseum, Quezon City

April 4

B-Meg Llamados 95, Meralco Bolts 85

Smart Araneta Coliseum, Quezon City

April 8

B-Meg Llamados 86, Meralco Bolts 76
B-Meg wins series, 2–1

Smart Araneta Coliseum, Quezon City

=== (4) Alaska vs. (5) Barako Bull series ===
April 1

Alaska Aces 90, Barako Bull Energy 103

Smart Araneta Coliseum, Quezon City

April 4

Alaska Aces 99, Barako Bull Energy 92

Smart Araneta Coliseum, Quezon City

April 8

Alaska Aces 85, Barako Bull Energy 106
Barako Bull wins series, 2–1

Smart Araneta Coliseum, Quezon City

== Semifinals ==
=== (1) Talk 'N Text vs. (5) Barako Bull ===
April 10

Talk 'N Text Tropang Texters 77, Barako Bull Energy 84

Ynares Center, Antipolo

April 12

Talk 'N Text Tropang Texters 123, Barako Bull Energy 98

Ynares Center, Antipolo

April 14

Talk 'N Text Tropang Texters 81, Barako Bull Energy 85

Cuneta Astrodome, Pasay

April 16

Talk 'N Text Tropang Texters 108, Barako Bull Energy 90

Smart Araneta Coliseum, Quezon City

April 18

Talk 'N Text Tropang Texters 101, Barako Bull Energy 90
Talk 'N Text wins series, 3–2

Smart Araneta Coliseum, Quezon City

=== (2) Barangay Ginebra vs. (3) B-Meg ===
April 11

Barangay Ginebra Kings 67, B-Meg Llamados 82

Ynares Center, Antipolo

April 13

Barangay Ginebra Kings 77, B-Meg Llamados 83

Smart Araneta Coliseum, Quezon City

April 15

Barangay Ginebra Kings 88, B-Meg Llamados 79

Cuneta Astrodome, Pasay

April 17

Barangay Ginebra Kings 84, B-Meg Llamados 108
B-Meg wins series, 3–1

Smart Araneta Coliseum, Quezon City

== Finals ==
April 23

Talk 'N Text Tropang Texters 82, B-Meg Llamados 88

Smart Araneta Coliseum, Quezon City

April 25

Talk 'N Text Tropang Texters 104, B-Meg Llamados 102

Smart Araneta Coliseum, Quezon City

April 27

Talk 'N Text Tropang Texters 87, B-Meg Llamados 91

Smart Araneta Coliseum, Quezon City

April 29

Talk 'N Text Tropang Texters 100, B-Meg Llamados 85

Smart Araneta Coliseum, Quezon City

May 2

Talk 'N Text Tropang Texters 66, B-Meg Llamados 82

Smart Araneta Coliseum, Quezon City

May 4

Talk 'N Text Tropang Texters 92, B-Meg Llamados 82

Smart Araneta Coliseum, Quezon City

May 6

Talk 'N Text Tropang Texters 84, B-Meg Llamados 90 (OT)
B-Meg wins series, 4–3

Smart Araneta Coliseum, Quezon City

== Imports ==
The following is the list of imports, which had played for their respective teams at least once, with the returning imports in italics. Highlighted are the imports who stayed with their respective teams for the whole conference.

Team	Name	Debuted	Last game	Record
Air21 Express	Marcus Douthit	February 19 (vs. Barako Bull)	March 28 (vs. Barangay Ginebra)	3–6
Alaska Aces	Adam Parada	February 10 (vs. Barako Bull)	April 8 (vs. Barako Bull)	6–6
B-Meg Llamados	Denzel Bowles	February 10 (vs. Meralco)	May 6 (vs. Talk 'N Text)	15–9
Barako Bull Energy	DerMarr Johnson	February 10 (vs. Alaska)	February 23 (vs. Rain or Shine)	1–3
Barako Bull Energy	Rodney White	March 2 (vs. Powerade)	March 25 (vs. Barangay Ginebra)	3–2
Barako Bull Energy	Reggie Okosa	April 1 (vs. Alaska)	April 1 (vs. Alaska)	1–0
Barako Bull Energy	Gabe Freeman	April 4 (vs. Alaska)	April 18 (vs. Talk 'N Text)	3–4
Barangay Ginebra Kings	Chris Alexander	February 12 (vs. Petron Blaze)	February 24 (vs. Rain or Shine)	2–1
Barangay Ginebra Kings	Jackson Vroman	March 4 (vs. Powerade)	April 17 (vs. B-Meg)	6–5
Meralco Bolts	Jarrid Famous	February 10 (vs. B-Meg)	February 17 (vs. Talk 'N Text)	1–2
Meralco Bolts	Earl Barron	February 26 (vs. Powerade)	April 8 (vs. B-Meg)	5–5
Petron Blaze Boosters	Nick Fazekas	February 12 (vs. Barangay Ginebra)	March 16 (vs. Alaska)	3–4
Petron Blaze Boosters	Will McDonald	March 21 (vs. Barako Bull)	March 28 (vs. Talk 'N Text)	0–2
Powerade Tigers	Dwayne Jones	February 17 (vs. Rain or Shine)	March 30 (vs. Meralco)	4–6
Rain or Shine Elasto Painters	Duke Crews	February 12 (vs. Alaska)	March 24 (vs. Talk 'N Text)	3–6
Talk 'N Text Tropang Texters	Omar Samhan	February 17 (vs. Meralco)	February 26 (vs. Alaska)	2–0
Talk 'N Text Tropang Texters	Donnell Harvey	March 7 (vs. Air21)	May 6 (vs. B-Meg)	10–8

== Awards ==
=== Conference ===
- Best Player of the Conference: Mark Caguioa (Barangay Ginebra)
- Best Import of the Conference: Denzel Bowles (B-Meg)
- Finals MVP: James Yap (B-Meg)

=== Players of the Week ===
Week	Player	Ref.
February 13–19	LA Tenorio (Alaska Aces)	
February 20–26	Gary David (Powerade Tigers)	
February 27 - March 4	Arwind Santos (Petron Blaze Boosters)	
March 5–11	Mark Cardona (Meralco Bolts)	
March 12–18	Rudy Hatfield (Barangay Ginebra Kings)	
March 19–25	Mark Caguioa (Barangay Ginebra Kings)	
March 26 - April 1	Mike Cortez (Barangay Ginebra Kings); Mark Cardona (Meralco Bolts)	
April 2–8	Ronald Tubid (Barako Bull Energy)	
April 9–15	Danny Seigle (Barako Bull Energy)	
April 16–22	Ranidel de Ocampo (Talk 'N Text Tropang Texters)	

== Statistical leaders ==
=== Locals ===
Category	Player	Team	Games played	Totals	Average
Points per game	Gary David	Powerade Tigers	10	271	27.10
Rebounds per game	Arwind Santos	Petron Blaze Boosters	9	100	11.11
Assists per game	Chris Ross	Meralco Bolts	13	102	7.85
Steals per game	Chris Ross	Meralco Bolts	13	24	1.85
Blocks per game	Arwind Santos	Petron Blaze Boosters	9	16	1.78
Field goal percentage	Jondan Salvador	Barako Bull Energy	10	17/28	0.607
3-pt field goal percentage	Larry Fonacier	Talk 'N Text Tropang Texters	21	37/86	0.430
Free throw percentage	Joseph Yeo	Petron Blaze Boosters	9	10/11	0.909
Minutes per game	Marcio Lassiter	Powerade Tigers	10	398	39.80
