= 2013 PBA Commissioner's Cup =

Second conference of the 2012–13 PBA season

- Duration: February 8 – May 19, 2013
- TV partner(s): Sports5 - AKTV on IBC; TV5 (Local); Aksyon TV International (International)

Finals
- Champions: Alaska Aces
- Runners-up: Barangay Ginebra San Miguel

Awards
- Best Player: LA Tenorio (Barangay Ginebra San Miguel)
- Best Import: Robert Dozier (Alaska Aces)
- Finals MVP: Sonny Thoss (Alaska Aces)

PBA Commissioner's Cup chronology
- < 2012 2014 >

PBA conference chronology
- < 2012–13 Philippine 2013 Governors' >

The 2013 Philippine Basketball Association (PBA) Commissioner's Cup was the second conference of the 2012–13 PBA season. The tournament began on February 8 and ended on May 19, 2013. The tournament is an import-laden format, which requires an import or a pure-foreign player for each team and with no height limit. From the semifinal round onwards, the tournament is sponsored by Cebuana Lhuillier.

== Format ==
Due to the preparations of the Philippines men's national basketball team for the upcoming FIBA Asia Championship, the opening of Governors' Cup was moved on the second week of August, at the conclusion of the FIBA tournament. The Commissioner's Cup was extended until the last week of May and adapted the tournament format used during the Philippine Cup.

The tournament format for this conference was as follows:

- Two-round eliminations, with each team playing 14 games. The teams are divided into two groups on the basis of their rankings from the previous Philippine Cup. Each team will play teams within their group once, while they will play teams from the other group twice. Standings will be determined in one league table; teams do not qualify by basis of groupings.
  - Group A:
    - Talk 'N Text Tropang Texters (#1)
    - Alaska Aces (#4)
    - Meralco Bolts (#5)
    - Air21 Express (#8)
    - Barako Bull Energy Cola (#9)
  - Group B:
    - Rain or Shine Elasto Painters (#2)
    - San Mig Coffee Mixers (#3)
    - Barangay Ginebra San Miguel (#6)
    - Petron Blaze Boosters (#7)
    - GlobalPort Batang Pier (#10)
- Top eight teams will advance to the quarterfinals. In case of tie, playoffs will be held only for the #2 and #8 seeds.
- Quarterfinals:
  - QF1: #1 seed vs #8 seed (#1 seed twice-to-beat)
  - QF2: #2 seed vs #7 seed (#2 seed twice-to-beat)
  - QF3: #3 seed vs #6 seed (best-of-3 series)
  - QF4: #4 seed vs #5 seed (best-of-3 series)
- Semifinals (best-of-5 series):
  - SF1: QF1 vs. QF4 winners
  - SF2: QF2 vs. QF3 winners
- Finals (best-of-5 series)
  - Winners of the semifinals

== Elimination round ==
=== Team standings ===
Pos	Team	W	L	PCT	GB	Qualification
1	Alaska Aces	11	3	.786	—	Twice-to-beat in the quarterfinals
2	Rain or Shine Elasto Painters	9	5	.643	2	Twice-to-beat in the quarterfinals
3	Petron Blaze Boosters	8	6	.571 (Note: Head-to-head record: Petron 2–0 San Mig)	3	Best-of-three quarterfinals
4	San Mig Coffee Mixers	8	6	.571	3	Best-of-three quarterfinals
5	Meralco Bolts	7	7	.500 (Note: Head-to-head quotient: Meralco 1.01, TNT 1.00, Barangay Ginebra 0.99)	4	Best-of-three quarterfinals
6	Talk 'N Text Tropang Texters	7	7	.500	4	Best-of-three quarterfinals
7	Barangay Ginebra San Miguel	7	7	.500	4	Twice-to-win in the quarterfinals
8	Air21 Express	6	8	.429	5	Twice-to-win in the quarterfinals
9	Barako Bull Energy Cola	5	9	.357	6	
10	GlobalPort Batang Pier	2	12	.143	9	

Source: PBA.ph

=== Results ===
Team	A21	ALA	BBEC	BGSM	GP	MER	PBB	ROS	SMC	TNT
Air21		74–68	86–91	74–70	106–94	88–89	53–60	97–99	87–82	83–86
Alaska	—		77–73	84–69	93–85	85–81	83–73	83–81	68–75	92–69
Barako Bull	—	—		72–93	98–88*	104–112	78–91	103–93	79–75	98–101
Barangay Ginebra	90–84	93–102	96–89		80–89	84–81	90–105	93–96	96–88	107–100
GlobalPort	72–87	92–93	87–96	—		89–90	94–92	95–103	84–91	79–99
Meralco	—	—	—	90–91	103–92		86–88	82–91	71–76	99–92
Petron Blaze	91–95*	84–92	88–77	—	—	92–102		87–79	98–73	85–93*
Rain or Shine	93–82	84–89*	106–97	—	—	116–118*	—		93–65	76–86
San Mig Coffee	80–66	84–83	100–105	—	—	97–90	—	—		90–82
Talk 'N Text	—	—	—	100–86	94–84	—	76–87	85–116	82–83	

Legend: Blue = left column team win; Red = top row team win.
Matches with lighter background shading were decided after overtime.

== Bracket ==
Quarterfinals
(#1 twice-to-beat)
1	Alaska	87
8	Air21	81
(Best-of-3)
4	San Mig Coffee	2
5	Meralco	1
(#2 twice-to-beat)
2	Rain or Shine	83	79
7	Barangay Ginebra	90	81
(Best-of-3)
3	Petron	0
6	Talk 'N Text	2

Semifinals (Best-of-5)
1	Alaska	3
4	San Mig Coffee	1
7	Barangay Ginebra	3
6	Talk 'N Text	2

Finals (Best-of-5)
1	Alaska	3
7	Barangay Ginebra	0

== Quarterfinals ==
=== (1) Alaska vs. (8) Air21 ===
April 20

Alaska Aces 87, Air21 Express 81
Alaska wins series in one game

Mall of Asia Arena, Pasay

=== (2) Rain or Shine vs. (7) Barangay Ginebra ===
April 20

Rain or Shine Elasto Painters 83, Barangay Ginebra San Miguel 90

Mall of Asia Arena, Pasay

April 22

Rain or Shine Elasto Painters 79, Barangay Ginebra San Miguel 81
Barangay Ginebra wins series in two games

Smart Araneta Coliseum, Quezon City

=== (3) Petron vs. (6) Talk 'N Text ===
April 19

Petron Blaze Boosters 93, Talk 'N Text Tropang Texters 100

Smart Araneta Coliseum, Quezon City

April 21

Petron Blaze Boosters 86, Talk 'N Text Tropang Texters 96
Talk 'N Text wins series, 2–0

Smart Araneta Coliseum, Quezon City

=== (4) San Mig Coffee vs. (5) Meralco ===
April 19

San Mig Coffee Mixers 85, Meralco Bolts 88

Smart Araneta Coliseum, Quezon City

April 21

San Mig Coffee Mixers 100, Meralco Bolts 92

Smart Araneta Coliseum, Quezon City

April 24

San Mig Coffee Mixers 90, Meralco Bolts 82
San Mig Coffee wins series, 2–1

Smart Araneta Coliseum, Quezon City

== Semifinals ==
=== (1) Alaska vs. (4) San Mig Coffee ===
April 27

Alaska Aces 69, San Mig Coffee Mixers 71

Smart Araneta Coliseum, Quezon City

April 29

Alaska Aces 86, San Mig Coffee Mixers 67

Mall of Asia Arena, Pasay

May 8

Alaska Aces 89, San Mig Coffee Mixers 82 (OT)

Smart Araneta Coliseum, Quezon City

May 11

Alaska Aces 83, San Mig Coffee Mixers 78
Alaska wins series, 3–1

Smart Araneta Coliseum, Quezon City

=== (6) Talk 'N Text vs. (7) Barangay Ginebra ===
April 26

Talk 'N Text Tropang Texters 81, Barangay Ginebra San Miguel 104

Smart Araneta Coliseum, Quezon City

April 28

Talk 'N Text Tropang Texters 85, Barangay Ginebra San Miguel 79

Smart Araneta Coliseum, Quezon City

May 8

Talk 'N Text Tropang Texters 98, Barangay Ginebra San Miguel 80

Smart Araneta Coliseum, Quezon City

May 10

Talk 'N Text Tropang Texters 101, Barangay Ginebra San Miguel 104

Smart Araneta Coliseum, Quezon City

May 12

Talk 'N Text Tropang Texters 103, Barangay Ginebra San Miguel 111
Barangay Ginebra wins series, 3–2

Smart Araneta Coliseum, Quezon City
Attendance: 21,480

== Finals ==
May 15

Alaska Aces 87, Barangay Ginebra San Miguel 70

Smart Araneta Coliseum, Quezon City

May 17

Alaska Aces 104, Barangay Ginebra San Miguel 90

Mall of Asia Arena, Pasay

May 19

Alaska Aces 104, Barangay Ginebra San Miguel 80
Alaska wins series, 3–0

Smart Araneta Coliseum, Quezon City

== Awards ==
=== Conference ===
- Best Player of the Conference: LA Tenorio (Barangay Ginebra)
- Bobby Parks Best Import of the Conference: Robert Dozier (Alaska)
- Finals MVP: Sonny Thoss (Alaska)

=== Players of the Week ===
Week	Player	Ref.
February 8–10	Josh Urbiztondo (Barako Bull Energy Cola)	
February 11–17	Cyrus Baguio (Alaska Aces)	
February 18–24	Sunday Salvacion (Meralco Bolts)	
February 25–March 3	Cyrus Baguio (Alaska Aces)	
March 4–10	Sonny Thoss (Alaska Aces)	
March 11–17	June Mar Fajardo (Petron Blaze Boosters)	
March 18–24	Mike Cortez (Air21 Express)	
March 25–31	Mick Pennisi (Barako Bull Energy Cola)	
April 1–7	Dondon Hontiveros (Alaska Aces)	
April 8–14	Niño Canaleta (Air21 Express)	
April 15–21	Ranidel De Ocampo (Talk 'N Text Tropang Texters)	
April 22–29	Kerby Raymundo (Barangay Ginebra San Miguel)	
May 7–13	LA Tenorio (Barangay Ginebra San Miguel)	

== Imports ==
The following is the list of imports, which had played for their respective teams at least once, with the returning imports in italics. Highlighted are the imports who stayed with their respective teams for the whole conference.

Team	Name	Debuted	Last game	Record
Air21 Express	Michael Dunigan	February 10 (vs. Brgy. Ginebra)	April 20 (vs. Alaska)	6–9
Alaska Aces	Robert Dozier	February 9 (vs. Rain or Shine)	May 19 (vs. Brgy. Ginebra)	18–4
Barako Bull Energy Cola	Evan Brock	February 8 (vs. San Mig Coffee)	March 31 (vs. San Mig Coffee)	4–7
Barako Bull Energy Cola	D. J. Mbenga	April 7 (vs. Petron)	April 14 (vs. GlobalPort)	1–2
Barangay Ginebra San Miguel	Herbert Hill	February 10 (vs. Air21)	February 17 (vs. Petron)	0–3
Barangay Ginebra San Miguel	Vernon Macklin	February 24 (vs. Alaska)	May 19 (vs. Alaska)	12–9
GlobalPort Batang Pier	Justin Williams	February 8 (vs. Petron)	March 8 (vs. Rain or Shine)	2–5
GlobalPort Batang Pier	Walter Sharpe	March 10 (vs. Air21)	March 17 (vs. Alaska)	0–2
GlobalPort Batang Pier	Sylvester Morgan	March 23 (vs. Air21)	April 14 (vs. Barako Bull)	0–5
Meralco Bolts	Eric Dawson	February 9 (vs. Talk 'N Text)	April 24 (vs. San Mig Coffee)	8–9
Petron Blaze Boosters	Renaldo Balkman	February 8 (vs. GlobalPort)	March 8 (vs. Alaska)	5–2
Petron Blaze Boosters	No Import	March 16 (vs. Rain or Shine)		1–0
Petron Blaze Boosters	Rodney White	March 22 (vs. Talk 'N Text)	March 27 (vs. Alaska)	0–2
Petron Blaze Boosters	Henry Sims	April 5 (vs. Meralco)	April 21 (vs. Talk 'N Text)	2–4
Rain or Shine Elasto Painters	Bruno Šundov	February 9 (vs. Alaska)	April 22 (vs. Brgy. Ginebra)	9–7
San Mig Coffee Mixers	No Import	February 8 (vs. Barako Bull)		0–1
San Mig Coffee Mixers	Matt Rogers	February 13 (vs. Petron)	February 13 (vs. Petron)	0–1
San Mig Coffee Mixers	Denzel Bowles	February 22 (vs. Rain or Shine)	May 11 (vs. Alaska)	11–8
Talk 'N Text Tropang Texters	Keith Benson	February 9 (vs. Meralco)	March 1 (vs. Alaska)	2–3
Talk 'N Text Tropang Texters	Donnell Harvey	March 9 (vs. Barako Bull)	April 6 (vs. GlobalPort)	4–3
Talk 'N Text Tropang Texters	Jerome Jordan	April 14 (vs. Brgy. Ginebra)	April 28 (vs. Brgy. Ginebra)	4–2
Talk 'N Text Tropang Texters	Tony Mitchell	May 8 (vs. Brgy. Ginebra)	May 12 (vs. Brgy. Ginebra)	1–2
