= Denzel Bowles =

American basketball player (born 1989)

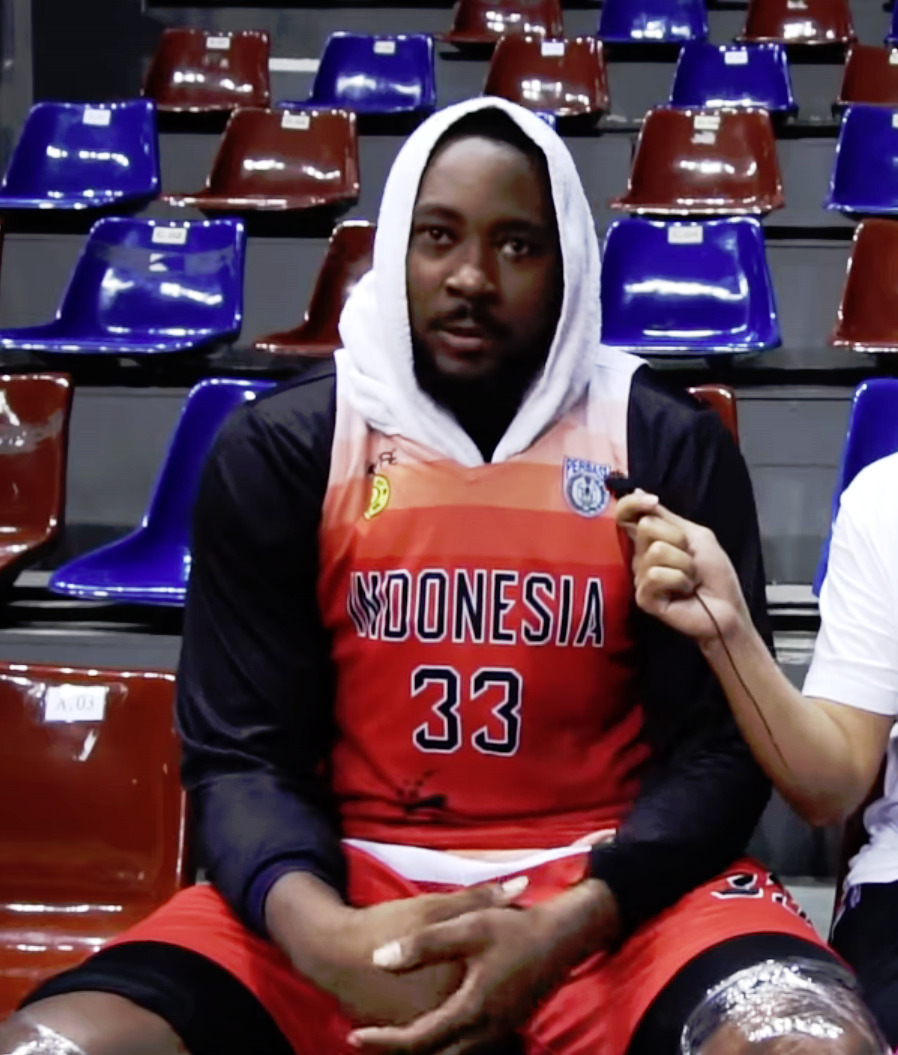

Personal information
- Born: May 1, 1989 (age 37) Virginia Beach, Virginia, U.S.
- Listed height: 6 ft 11 in (2.11 m)
- Listed weight: 255 lb (116 kg)

Career information
- High school: Kempsville (Virginia Beach, Virginia)
- College: Texas A&M (2007–2009); James Madison (2009–2011)
- NBA draft: 2011: undrafted
- Playing career: 2011–2020
- Position: Power forward / center

Career history
- 2011–2012: BC Šiauliai
- 2012: B-Meg Llamados
- 2012–2013: Zhejiang Golden Bulls
- 2013: San Mig Coffee Mixers
- 2013–2014: Jilin Northeast Tigers
- 2015: Purefoods Star Hotshots
- 2015: Marinos de Anzoátegui
- 2016: Star Hotshots
- 2016: Leones de Ponce
- 2017: Al Mouttahed Tripoli
- 2017: Hapoel Eilat
- 2018: San Lázaro
- 2018: Sol de América
- 2018–2019: Kanazawa Samuraiz
- 2019: Rain or Shine Elasto Painters
- 2019: Jilin Northeast Tigers
- 2020: Anyang KGC

Career highlights
- PBA champion (2012 Commissioner's); PBA Best Import (2012 Commissioners')

Denzel Onassis Bowles (born May 1, 1989) is an American former professional basketball player.

== Professional career ==
=== 2011–12 season ===
Bowles began his professional career with BC Šiauliai of the Lithuanian League. There, he averaged 12.6 points per game and 6.4 rebounds per game while playing in 12 games.

On May 6, 2012, Bowles helped the B-Meg Llamados to win the 2012 PBA Commissioner's Cup championship. He was fouled with 1.2 seconds left in the seventh game of the championship series, and nailed both free throws to send the game into overtime and win 90–84. Bowles finished that game with 39 points and 21 rebounds.

=== 2012–13 season ===
Bowles signed in September 2012 to play for the Zhejiang Golden Bulls of the Chinese Basketball Association (CBA).

In the middle of 2013, Bowles returned to the Philippines for the second time as an import for his former team in the country, now renamed as the San Mig Coffee Mixers, for the 2013 PBA Commissioner's Cup.

=== 2013–14 season ===
Bowles signed in 2013 to play for the Jilin Northeast Tigers of the Chinese Basketball Association (CBA) after playing for the New Orleans Hornets team in the NBA Summer League.

On March 8, 2014, Bowles signed with the Iowa Energy of the NBA Development League.

=== 2014–15 season ===
On September 21, 2014, he signed again with the Jilin Northeast Tigers.

On February 21, 2015, he signed with the Purefoods Star Hotshots to replace Daniel Orton after Orton was suspended for a remark Orton made about Manny Pacquiao playing in the league.

=== 2015–16 season ===
On October 13, 2015, Bowles signed with Marinos de Anzoátegui of the Liga Profesional de Baloncesto, Venezuela's premier basketball league. This is Bowles' first time playing in South America.

In January 2016, Bowles signed again with the Star Hotshots as the team's import for the 2016 PBA Commissioner's Cup. However, in March 2016, Bowles was released by the Hotshots to attend a family matter in the United States.

=== 2016–17 season ===
He signed a contract with the Lebanese team Al Mouttahed on January 4 to join the FLB league.

In February 2017, Bowles signed with the TNT KaTropa of the PBA as the team's import for the 2017 PBA Commissioner's Cup. However, on March 16, a day before the conference began, he was declared by the team as "not fit", thus dropping him from the team.

=== 2017–18 season ===
On September 18, 2017, Bowles signed with the Israeli team Hapoel Eilat for the 2017–18 season. However, on October 25, 2017, he was released by Eilat after appearing in three games.

On March 16, 2018, Bowles signed with San Lázaro of the Dominican Torneo de Baloncesto Superior (TBS). After the season ended, he signed with Sol de América of the Paraguayan Metropolitan Basketball League.

=== 2018–19 season ===
In May 2019, Bowles returned to the PBA, this time for the Rain or Shine Elasto Painters as their import for the 2019 PBA Commissioner's Cup.
