= 2008–09 Alaska Aces season =

- Head coach: Tim Cone
- General Manager: Joaqui Trillo
- Owner(s): Wilfred Uytengsu

Philippine Cup results
- Record: 19–12 (61.3%)
- Place: 2nd
- Playoff finish: Finals (lost to TNT, 4–3)

Fiesta Conference results
- Record: 6–10 (37.5%)
- Place: 9th
- Playoff finish: Wildcard (lost to Burger King)

Alaska Aces seasons

The 2008–09 Alaska Aces season was the 23rd season of the franchise in the Philippine Basketball Association (PBA).

== Key dates ==
- August 30: The 2008 PBA Draft took place in Fort Bonifacio, Taguig.
- September 1: The free agency period started.

== Draft picks ==
Round	Pick	Player	Height	Position	Nationality	College
1	5	Solomon Mercado	6'1"	Point guard	United States	Biola
2	15	Kelvin dela Peña	6'1"	Point guard	Philippines	Mapúa

== Roster ==
2008–09 Alaska Aces roster
Players

Pos.	#	POB	Name	Height	Weight	DOB (YYYY–MM–DD)	From
SF	4	(Philippines)	Mark Borboran	6 ft 4 in (1.93 m)	197 lb (89 kg)		UE
C	7	(Papua New Guinea)	Sonny Thoss	6 ft 7 in (2.01 m)	205 lb (93 kg)		James Cook
PG	9	(Philippines)	LA Tenorio	5 ft 8 in (1.73 m)	151 lb (68 kg)		Ateneo
SG	12	(Philippines)	Larry Fonacier	6 ft 2 in (1.88 m)	170 lb (77 kg)		Ateneo
PG	13	(Philippines)	Miller, Willie	5 ft 11 in (1.80 m)	195 lb (88 kg)		Letran
PG	15	(Philippines)	Kelvin dela Peña	6 ft 1 in (1.85 m)	180 lb (82 kg)		Mapúa
PF	21	(Philippines)	Reynel Hugnatan	6 ft 4 in (1.93 m)	210 lb (95 kg)		Manila
SG	22	(United States)	Jeffrey Cariaso (C)	6 ft 2 in (1.88 m)	180 lb (82 kg)		Sonoma State
PG	24	(United States)	Brandon Cablay	6 ft 0 in (1.83 m)	165 lb (75 kg)		Vanguard
C	30	(Philippines)	Ervin Sotto	6 ft 7 in (2.01 m)	210 lb (95 kg)		Saint Francis of Assisi
SF	35	(United States)	Tony dela Cruz	6 ft 5 in (1.96 m)	209 lb (95 kg)		UC Irvine
SF	38	(United States)	Joe Devance	6 ft 7 in (2.01 m)	225 lb (102 kg)		UTEP
PF	55	(Philippines)	John Ferriols	6 ft 4 in (1.93 m)	210 lb (95 kg)		USJ–R

Coaches
Head coach
- (United States) Tim Cone
Assistant(s)
- (Philippines) Joel Banal (Mapúa)
- (Philippines) Jojo Lastimosa (Ateneo)
- (Philippines) Dickie Bachmann (De La Salle)
- (Philippines) Luigi Trillo (De La Salle)
- (Philippines) Bong Hawkins (UPHSD)

Legend
- (DP) Unsigned draft pick
- (FA) Free agent
- (S) Suspended
- Injured

== Depth chart ==
Pos.	Starting 5	Bench 1	Reserve	Inactive
C	Sonny Thoss	John Ferriols	Ervin Sotto	Frederick Canlas
PF	Joe Devance	Reynel Hugnatan		Poch Juinio
SF	Tony Dela Cruz	Larry Fonacier	Mark Borboran
SG	Willie Miller	Jeffrey Cariaso		Ariel Capus
PG	LA Tenorio	Kelvin dela Peña

== Philippine Cup ==
=== Standings ===
Pos	Team	W	L	PCT	GB	Qualification
1	Alaska Aces	12	6	.667	—	Advance to semifinals
2	Talk 'N Text Tropang Texters	11	7	.611	1	Advance to semifinals
3	Barangay Ginebra Kings	10	8	.556 (Note: Head-to-head differential: Barangay Ginebra +16, Rain or Shine −3, Sta. Lucia −13)	2	Advance to quarterfinals
4	Rain or Shine Elasto Painters	10	8	.556	2	Advance to quarterfinals
5	Sta. Lucia Realtors	10	8	.556	2	Advance to quarterfinals
6	San Miguel Beermen	9	9	.500	3	Advance to wildcard round
7	Purefoods Tender Juicy Giants	8	10	.444 (Note: Head-to-head record: Purefoods 2–0 Air21)	4	Advance to wildcard round
8	Air21 Express	8	10	.444	4	Advance to wildcard round
9	Coca-Cola Tigers	7	11	.389	5	Advance to wildcard round
10	Red Bull Barako	5	13	.278	7	

Source: PBA.ph

==== Game log ====
2009 PBA Philippine Cup game log
October

Game	Date	Opponent	Score	High points	High rebounds	High assists	Location Attendance	Record
1	October 5	San Miguel	85–84	Miller (17)			Cuneta Astrodome	1–0
2	October 11	Coca Cola	69–62				Victorias, Negros Occidental	2–0
3	October 16	Red Bull	89–83	Miller (13)			JCSGO Gym (Cubao)	3–0
4	October 19	Rain or Shine	91–84	Miller (21)			Araneta Coliseum	4–0
5	October 24	Talk 'N Text	83–91	Miller (29)			Ynares Center	4–1
6	October 29	Air21	107–109	Devance (25)			Araneta Coliseum	4–2

November

Game	Date	Opponent	Score	High points	High rebounds	High assists	Location Attendance	Record
7	November 2	Brgy.Ginebra	93–84 OT	Miller (25)	Devance (20)	Miller (6)	Araneta Coliseum	5–2
8	November 7	Sta.Lucia	95–89			Tenorio (7)	Cuneta Astrodome	6–2
9	November 9	Purefoods	95–80	Devance (20)			Araneta Coliseum	7–2
10	November 15	San Miguel	91–85	Miller (20)				8–2
11	November 19	Rain or Shine	88–92	Miller (29)			Araneta Coliseum	8–3
12	November 22	Talk 'N Text	113–86	Devance (21)			The Arena in San Juan	9–3
13	November 28	Sta.Lucia	80–92	Miller (22)			Ynares Center	9–4

December

Game	Date	Opponent	Score	High points	High rebounds	High assists	Location Attendance	Record
14	December 5	Coca Cola	99–83				Araneta Coliseum	10–4
15	December 10	Red Bull	80–100	Miller (13)			Araneta Coliseum	10–5
16	December 13	Brgy.Ginebra	82–84				Cagayan de Oro	10–6
17	December 19	Air21	76–65	Miller (23)			Ynares Center	11–6
18	December 21	Purefoods	76–74				Cuneta Astrodome	12–6

2008–09 schedule

== Awards and records ==
=== Records ===
Note: Alaska Aces Records Only

Record	Stat	Holder	Date/s
Most points in one game	29	Willie Miller	2 Occasions
Most rebounds in one game	20	Joe Devance vs. Barangay Ginebra Kings	November 2, 2008
Most assists in one game	10	Willie Miller vs. Air21 Express	December 19, 2008
Most blocks in one game	4	Sonny Thoss vs. Coca-Cola Tigers	October 12, 2008
Most steals in one game	3	5 Tied	5 Occasions
Most minutes played in one game	42	LA Tenorio vs. Sta. Lucia Realtors	November 7, 2008
Most minutes played in one game	42	Willie Miller vs. Rain or Shine Elasto Painters	November 19, 2008

== Transactions ==
=== Trades ===
September 1, 2008	To Alaska Aces Joe Devance	To Rain or Shine Elasto Painters Solomon Mercado and Eddie Laure
September 22, 2008	To Alaska Aces Mark Borboran	To Air21 Express J. R. Quiñahan

=== Free Agents ===
==== Additions ====
Player	Signed	Former team
Adonis Santa Maria	October	Rain or Shine Elasto Painters

==== Subtractions ====
Player	Signed	New team
Ervin Sotto	October	Alaska Aces
