= 2008–09 Barako Bull Energy Boosters season =

- Head coach: Yeng Guiao; Leo Isaac
- General Manager: Tony Chua
- Owner(s): Tony Chua

Philippine Cup results
- Record: 5–13 (27.8%)
- Place: 10th
- Playoff finish: Did not qualify

Fiesta Conference results
- Record: 2–13 (13.3%)
- Place: 10th
- Playoff finish: Wildcard phase (lost to Rain or Shine)

Barako Bull Energy Boosters seasons

The 2008–09 Barako Bull Energy Boosters season was the 9th season of the franchise in the Philippine Basketball Association (PBA). Formerly known as Red Bull Barako in the Philippine Cup.

== Key dates ==
- August 30: The 2008 PBA Draft took place in Fort Bonifacio, Taguig.
- September 1: The free agency period started.

== Draft picks ==
| Round | Pick | Player | Height | Position | Nationality | College |
|---|---|---|---|---|---|---|
| 1 | 9 | Larry Rodriguez | 6 ft 6 in | PF | Philippines | PMI |
| 2 | 17 | Jeffrei Chan | 6 ft 3 in | SG | Philippines | Far Eastern |
| 2 | 19 | Mark Cuevas | 6 ft 5 in | SG/SF | Philippines; United States | LACC |

== Roster ==
2008–09 Barako Bull Energy Boosters roster
Players

| Pos. | # | POB | Name | Height | Weight | DOB (YYYY–MM–DD) | From |
|---|---|---|---|---|---|---|---|
| C | 2 | (United States) | Michael Holper | 6 ft 7 in (2.01 m) | 210 lb (95 kg) | | San Diego State |
| PG | 4 | (Philippines) | Warren Ybañez | 5 ft 7 in (1.70 m) | 155 lb (70 kg) | | PSBA |
| PF | 5 | (Philippines) | Rodriguez, Larry | 6 ft 4 in (1.93 m) | 200 lb (91 kg) | | PMI |
| SG | 6 | (Philippines) | Jeffrei Chan | 6 ft 2 in (1.88 m) | 185 lb (84 kg) | | Far Eastern |
| PF | 10 | (Philippines) | Gabby Espinas | 6 ft 4 in (1.93 m) | 200 lb (91 kg) | | Philippine Christian |
| SG | 11 | (Philippines) | Jojo Duncil | 6 ft 1 in (1.85 m) | 180 lb (82 kg) | | UST |
| PG | 12 | (Philippines) | Paolo Hubalde | 5 ft 11 in (1.80 m) | 170 lb (77 kg) | | UE |
| SF | 14 | (Philippines) | Leo Najorda | 6 ft 3 in (1.91 m) | 210 lb (95 kg) | | San Sebastian |
| PG | 16 | (Philippines) | Magnum Membrere | 5 ft 11 in (1.80 m) | 170 lb (77 kg) | | Ateneo |
| SG | 18 | (Philippines) | Reed Juntilla | 6 ft 2 in (1.88 m) | 180 lb (82 kg) | | Visayas |
| SF | 20 | (Philippines) | Richard Alonzo | 6 ft 4 in (1.93 m) | 209 lb (95 kg) | | Adamson |
| SF | 31 | (United States) | John Arigo | 6 ft 5 in (1.96 m) | 185 lb (84 kg) | | North Florida |
| PF | 41 | (Philippines) | Mike Hrabak (C) | 6 ft 7 in (2.01 m) | 215 lb (98 kg) | | Central Arizona |
| C | 43 | (United States) | Alex Crisano | 6 ft 7 in (2.01 m) | 240 lb (109 kg) |

Coaches
Head coach
- (Philippines) Leo Isaac (Mapúa)
Assistant(s)
- (Philippines) Ariel Vanguardia (De La Salle)
- (Philippines) Raymund Celis (UP Diliman)

Legend
- (DP) Unsigned draft pick
- (FA) Free agent
- (S) Suspended
- Injured

== Depth chart ==
| Pos. | Starting 5 | Bench 1 | Reserve | Inactive |
|---|---|---|---|---|
| C | Carlo Sharma | Alex Crisano | | Mike Holper |
| PF | Daryan Selvy | Mike Hrabak |
| SF | Gabby Espinas | Leo Najorda | Larry Rodriguez |
| SG | Jeffrei Chan | John Arigo | Reed Juntilla |
| PG | Paolo Hubalde | Jojo Duncil | Magnum Membrere |

== Philippine Cup ==
=== Elimination round ===
==== Standings ====
| Pos | Team | W | L | PCT | GB | Qualification |
|---|---|---|---|---|---|---|
| 1 | Alaska Aces | 12 | 6 | .667 | — | Advance to semifinals |
| 2 | Talk 'N Text Tropang Texters | 11 | 7 | .611 | 1 | Advance to semifinals |
| 3 | Barangay Ginebra Kings | 10 | 8 | .556 (Note: Head-to-head differential: Barangay Ginebra +16, Rain or Shine −3, Sta. Lucia −13) | 2 | Advance to quarterfinals |
| 4 | Rain or Shine Elasto Painters | 10 | 8 | .556 | 2 | Advance to quarterfinals |
| 5 | Sta. Lucia Realtors | 10 | 8 | .556 | 2 | Advance to quarterfinals |
| 6 | San Miguel Beermen | 9 | 9 | .500 | 3 | Advance to wildcard round |
| 7 | Purefoods Tender Juicy Giants | 8 | 10 | .444 (Note: Head-to-head record: Purefoods 2–0 Air21) | 4 | Advance to wildcard round |
| 8 | Air21 Express | 8 | 10 | .444 | 4 | Advance to wildcard round |
| 9 | Coca-Cola Tigers | 7 | 11 | .389 | 5 | Advance to wildcard round |
| 10 | Red Bull Barako | 5 | 13 | .278 | 7 | |

Source: PBA.ph

==== Game log ====
2009 PBA Philippine Cup game log
October

| Game | Date | Opponent | Score | High points | High rebounds | High assists | Location Attendance | Record |
|---|---|---|---|---|---|---|---|---|
| 1 | October 8 | Purefoods | 73–77 | Espinas (18) | Najorda (8) | Baguio (4) | Araneta Coliseum | 0–1 |
| 2 | October 10 | Rain or Shine | 90–96 | Cruz (17) | Espinas (17) | Baguio (3) | Cuneta Astrodome | 0–2 |
| 3 | October 16 | Alaska | 83–89 | Rodriguez (19) | Rodriguez (15) | Baguio (4) | JCSGO Gym | 0–3 |
| 4 | October 19 | Ginebra | 100-94 | Espinas (18) | Sharma (12) | Hubalde (5) | Araneta Coliseum | 1–3 |
| 5 | October 25 | San Miguel | 114-113 | Baguio (17) | Espinas (10) | Cruz, Baguio (5) | Misamis Oriental | 2–3 |
| 6 | October 29 | Talk 'N Text | 104-102 | Baguio, Espinas (20) | Rodriguez, Espinas (6) | Cruz, Espinas, Duncil (4) | Araneta Coliseum | 3–3 |

November

| Game | Date | Opponent | Score | High points | High rebounds | High assists | Location Attendance | Record |
|---|---|---|---|---|---|---|---|---|
| 7 | November 2 | Coca-Cola | 92–97 | Rodriguez (15) | Espinas (12) | Najorda, Duncil, Hubalde (3) | Araneta Coliseum | 3–4 |
| 8 | November 9 | Sta. Lucia | 80–83 | Espinas (20) | Espinas (13) | Cruz (4) | Cuneta Astrodome | 3–5 |
| 9 | November 14 | Purefoods | 72–80 | Espinas (21) | Espinas (9) | Baguio, Chan (3) | Ynares Center | 3–6 |
| 10 | November 16 | Talk 'N Text | 93–103 | Cruz (15) | Espinas (11) | Sharma, Duncil (4) | Cuneta Astrodome | 3–7 |
| 11 | November 21 | Air21 | 89–92 | Baguio (18) | Rodriguez (11) | Baguio (5) | araneta Coliseum | 3–8 |
| 12 | November 28 | Rain or Shine | 92–100 | Sharma (18) | Sharma (12) | Baguio (5) | Ynares Center | 3–9 |

December

| Game | Date | Opponent | Score | High points | High rebounds | High assists | Location Attendance | Record |
|---|---|---|---|---|---|---|---|---|
| 13 | December 3 | Ginebra | 76–83 | Baguio (16) | Holper, Cruz (9) | Hubalde (3) | Araneta Coliseum | 3–10 |
| 14 | December 6 | San Miguel | 84–89 | Espinas (14) | Espinas (11) | Baguio (5) | Cuneta Astrodome | 3–11 |
| 15 | December 10 | Alaska | 100-80 | Chan (23) | Holper (10) | Ybañez (5) | Araneta Coliseum | 4–11 |
| 16 | December 12 | Air21 | 98-88 | Sharma (22) | Rodriguez (9) | Ybañez (5) | Araneta Coliseum | 5–11 |
| 17 | December 19 | Coca-Cola | 86–88 | Baguio (15) | Sharma (10) | Cruz (5) | Ynares Center | 5–12 |
| 18 | December 21 | Sta. Lucia | 98–102 | Chan (23) | Espinas (12) | Baguio (5) | Cuneta Astrodome | 5–13 |

2008–09 schedule

== Awards and records ==
=== Records ===
Note: Red Bull Barako Records Only

| Record | Stat | Holder | Date/s |
|---|---|---|---|
| Most points in one game | 23 | Jeffrei Chan vs. Alaska Aces | December 10, 2008 |
| Most rebounds in one game | 17 | Gabby Espinas vs. Rain or Shine Elasto Painters | October 10, 2008 |
| Most assists in one game | 5 | 5 Tied | 7 Occasions |
| Most blocks in one game | 6 | Mike Hrabak vs. Purefoods TJ Giants | October 8, 2008 |
| Most steals in one game | 4 | Cyrus Baguio vs. San Miguel Beermen | November 29, 2008 |
| Most steals in one game | 4 | Cyrus Baguio vs. Air21 Express | December 12, 2008 |
| Most minutes played in one game | 36 | Cyrus Baguio vs. Sta. Lucia Realtors | November 9, 2008 |
| Most minutes played in one game | 36 | Jeffrei Chan vs. Air21 Express | December 12, 2008 |

== Transactions ==
=== Trades ===
| Traded | to | For |
| Mick Pennisi | San Miguel Beermen | Draft Picks |
| Rich Alvarez | Purefoods TJ Giants | Draft Picks |
| Draft Picks | Barangay Ginebra Kings | Michael Holper |

=== Free agents ===
==== Additions ====
| Player | Signed | Former team |
| Paolo Hubalde | September | Barangay Ginebra Kings |
| Gabby Espinas | September | Air21 Express |

==== Subtractions ====
| Player | Left | New team |
| Topex Robinson | September | Purefoods TJ Giants |
