= 2008–09 Talk 'N Text Tropang Texters season =

- Head coach: Chot Reyes
- General Manager: Frankie Lim; Virgil Villavicencio (assistant)
- Owner(s): Smart Communications (an MVP Group subsidiary)

Philippine Cup results
- Record: 19–12 (61.3%)
- Place: 2nd
- Playoff finish: Champions (vs. Alaska 4–3)

Fiesta Conference results
- Record: 7–8 (46.7%)
- Place: 5th
- Playoff finish: Quarterfinals

Talk 'N Text Tropang Texters seasons

The 2008–09 Talk 'N Text Tropang Texters season was the 19th season of the franchise in the Philippine Basketball Association (PBA).

== Key dates ==
- August 30: The 2008 PBA draft took place in Fort Bonifacio, Taguig.
- September 1: The free agency period started.

== Draft picks ==
Round	Pick	Player	Height	Position	Nationality	College
1	2	Jared Dillinger	6'5"	Guard/Forward	Philippines	Hawaii
1	3	Jayson Castro	5'11"	Point guard	Philippines	PCU
1	4	Rob Reyes	6'6"	Power forward	Philippines	Flagler College
2	1	Pong Escobal	5'11"	Point guard	Philippines	San Beda

== Roster ==
2008–09 Talk 'N Text Tropang Texters roster
Players

Pos.	#	POB	Name	Height	Weight	DOB (YYYY–MM–DD)	From
PF	2	(United States)	Robert Reyes	6 ft 6 in (1.98 m)	225 lb (102 kg)		Flagler
PG	3	(United States)	Jimmy Alapag (C)	5 ft 9 in (1.75 m)	160 lb (73 kg)		Cal State San Bernardino
SF	4	(United States)	Harvey Carey	6 ft 3 in (1.91 m)	210 lb (95 kg)		Sonoma State
SG	9	(Philippines)	Mark Cardona	6 ft 1 in (1.85 m)	175 lb (79 kg)		De La Salle
SF	10	(Philippines)	Yousif Aljamal	6 ft 4 in (1.93 m)	190 lb (86 kg)		San Beda
PG	11	(Philippines)	Pong Escobal	5 ft 11 in (1.80 m)	180 lb (82 kg)		San Beda
SG	14	(Philippines)	Ren-Ren Ritualo	6 ft 1 in (1.85 m)	160 lb (73 kg)		De La Salle
PG	17	(Philippines)	Jayson Castro	5 ft 11 in (1.80 m)	185 lb (84 kg)		Philippine Christian
C	18	(Philippines)	Yancy de Ocampo	6 ft 9 in (2.06 m)	220 lb (100 kg)		Saint Francis of Assisi
SF	20	(United States)	Jared Dillinger	6 ft 5 in (1.96 m)	200 lb (91 kg)		Hawaiʻi
SG	24	(Philippines)	Gec Chia	6 ft 2 in (1.88 m)	185 lb (84 kg)		Ateneo
PF	33	(Philippines)	Ranidel de Ocampo	6 ft 5 in (1.96 m)	200 lb (91 kg)		Saint Francis of Assisi
C	34	(United States)	Ali Peek	6 ft 5 in (1.96 m)	220 lb (100 kg)		Saint Mary's
C	98	(Philippines)	Gilbert Lao	6 ft 7 in (2.01 m)	210 lb (95 kg)		UST

Coaches
Head coach
- (Philippines) Chot Reyes (Ateneo)
Assistant(s)
- Aboy Castro (Philippines)
- (Philippines) Nash Racela (Ateneo)
- (Philippines) Patrick Fran (UST)
- (Philippines) Bong Ravena (UE)

Legend
- (DP) Unsigned draft pick
- (FA) Free agent
- (S) Suspended
- Injured

=== Current depth chart ===
Pos.	Starting 5	Bench 1	Reserve
C	Ali Peek	Yancy de Ocampo	Gilbert Lao
PF	Rashad Bell	Ranidel De Ocampo	Robert Reyes
SF	Jared Dillinger	Harvey Carey	Yousif Aljamal
SG	Mark Cardona	Ren-Ren Ritualo	Gec Chia
PG	Jimmy Alapag	Jayson Castro	Pong Escobal

== Philippine Cup ==
=== Standings ===
Pos	Team	W	L	PCT	GB	Qualification
1	Alaska Aces	12	6	.667	—	Advance to semifinals
2	Talk 'N Text Tropang Texters	11	7	.611	1	Advance to semifinals
3	Barangay Ginebra Kings	10	8	.556 (Note: Head-to-head differential: Barangay Ginebra +16, Rain or Shine −3, Sta. Lucia −13)	2	Advance to quarterfinals
4	Rain or Shine Elasto Painters	10	8	.556	2	Advance to quarterfinals
5	Sta. Lucia Realtors	10	8	.556	2	Advance to quarterfinals
6	San Miguel Beermen	9	9	.500	3	Advance to wildcard round
7	Purefoods Tender Juicy Giants	8	10	.444 (Note: Head-to-head record: Purefoods 2–0 Air21)	4	Advance to wildcard round
8	Air21 Express	8	10	.444	4	Advance to wildcard round
9	Coca-Cola Tigers	7	11	.389	5	Advance to wildcard round
10	Red Bull Barako	5	13	.278	7	

Source: PBA.ph

=== Game log ===
2009 PBA Philippine Cup game log
October

Game	Date	Opponent	Score	High points	High rebounds	High assists	Location Attendance	Record
1	October 4	Coca Cola	98–97				Araneta Coliseum	1–0
2	October 9	Air21	112–101	Dillinger (23) Alapag (23)			Ynares Sports Arena	2–0
3	October 12	Sta.Lucia	96–117	Cardona (19)			Araneta Coliseum	2–1
4	October 17	San Miguel	77–84	Cardona (27)			Araneta Coliseum	2–2
5	October 24	Alaska	91–83	Cardona (24)			Ynares Center	3–2
6	October 29	Red Bull	102–104	Cardona (26)			Araneta Coliseum	3–3
7	October 31	Rain or Shine	96–104	Cardona (27)			Araneta Coliseum	3–4

November

Game	Date	Opponent	Score	High points	High rebounds	High assists	Location Attendance	Record
8	November 7	Purefoods	87–88	Cardona (21)			Cuneta Astrodome	3–5
9	November 12	Brgy.Ginebra	103–90	Cardona (32)			Cuneta Astrodome	4–5
10	November 16	Red Bull	103–93	Cardona (42)			Cuneta Astrodome	5–5
11	November 22	Alaska	86–113	Castro (16)			The Arena in San Juan	5–6
12	November 26	Sta.Lucia	104–83				Araneta Coliseum	6–6
13	November 30	San Miguel	85–80	Alapag (20)			Singapore Indoor Stadium	7–6

December

Game	Date	Opponent	Score	High points	High rebounds	High assists	Location Attendance	Record
14	December 7	Coca Cola	90–82	Cardona (29)			Araneta Coliseum	8–6
15	December 10	Rain or Shine	92–83	Cardona (24) Alapag (24)			Araneta Coliseum	9–6
16	December 14	Purefoods	93–96				Araneta Coliseum	9–7
17	December 17	Brgy.Ginebra	109–85				Araneta Coliseum	10–7
18	December 25	Air21	109–108				Araneta Coliseum	11–7

2008–09 schedule

== Records ==
Note: Talk 'N Text Tropang Texters Records Only

Record	Stat	Holder	Date/s
Most points in one game	42	Mark Cardona vs. Red Bull Barako	November 16, 2008
Most rebounds in one game	22	Harvey Carey vs. San Miguel Beermen	January 25, 2009
Most assists in one game	7	Jimmy Alapag vs. Alaska Aces	November 22, 2008
Most assists in one game		Jayson Castro	2 Occasions
Most blocks in one game	3	Don Allado vs.Red Bull Barako	November 16, 2008
Most blocks in one game		Ali Peek	2 Occasions
Most blocks in one game		Rob Reyes vs. Coca-Cola Tigers	October 4, 2008
Most steals in one game	4	Jayson Castro vs. Alaska Aces	November 22, 2008
Most minutes played in one game	42	Harvey Carey	2 Occasions

== Transactions ==
=== Trades ===
September 1, 2008	To Talk 'N Text Tropang Texters Jayson Castro	To San Miguel Beermen Jay Washington

December 17, 2008	To Talk 'N Text Tropang Texters Ranidel de Ocampo	To Air21 Express Don Allado

=== Free Agents ===
==== Subtractions ====
Player	Signed	New team
Kalani Ferreria	October	Barangay Ginebra Kings
Donbel Belano	October	Barako Bull Energy Boosters
