= 2008–09 Burger King Whoppers season =

- Head coach: Bo Perasol (Philippine Cup); Yeng Guiao (Fiesta Conference)

Philippine Cup results
- Record: 8–10 (44.4%)
- Place: 8th
- Playoff finish: 2nd Wildcard round (lost to SMB)

Fiesta Conference results
- Record: 8–6 (57.1%)
- Place: 4th
- Playoff finish: Semifinals (lost to SMB, 4–2)

Burger King Whoppers seasons

The 2008–09 Burger King Whoppers season was the 7th season of the franchise in the Philippine Basketball Association (PBA). The team were previously known as the Air21 Express in the Philippine Cup and the Burger King Titans in the first 6 games of the Fiesta Conference.

== Key dates ==
- August 30: The 2008 PBA draft took place in Fort Bonifacio, Taguig.
- September 1: The free agency period started.

== Draft picks ==
Round	Pick	Player	Height	Position	Nationality	College
1	6	Mark Borboran	6'6"	SG/SF	Philippines	East
2	13	Pocholo Villanueva	6'3"	PG/SG	Philippines	De La Salle

== Roster ==
2008–09 Burger King Whoppers roster
Players

Pos.	#	POB	Name	Height	Weight	DOB (YYYY–MM–DD)	From
PG	3	(Philippines)	Egay Billones	5 ft 8 in (1.73 m)	165 lb (75 kg)		Centro Escolar Las Piñas
PG	6	(Philippines)	Marvin Cruz	5 ft 8 in (1.73 m)	160 lb (73 kg)		UP Diliman
SF	8	(Philippines)	Erick Rodriguez	6 ft 4 in (1.93 m)	200 lb (91 kg)		Letran
SG	9	(Philippines)	Pocholo Villanueva	6 ft 3 in (1.91 m)	170 lb (77 kg)		De La Salle
SF	17	(Philippines)	Aaron Aban	6 ft 3 in (1.91 m)	200 lb (91 kg)		Letran
PG	19	(Philippines)	Wynne Arboleda (C)	5 ft 11 in (1.80 m)	180 lb (82 kg)		MLQU
SG	20	(Philippines)	Gary David	6 ft 2 in (1.88 m)	175 lb (79 kg)		Lyceum
SF	28	(Philippines)	Mark Yee	6 ft 3 in (1.91 m)	170 lb (77 kg)		San Sebastian (Cavite)
SF	29	(Philippines)	Arwind Santos	6 ft 4 in (1.93 m)	170 lb (77 kg)		Far Eastern
C	30	(Philippines)	Beau Belga	6 ft 6 in (1.98 m)	225 lb (102 kg)		Philippine Christian
C	34	(Philippines)	Carlo Sharma	6 ft 6 in (1.98 m)	220 lb (100 kg)		De La Salle
PF	48	(Philippines)	J.R. Quiñahan	6 ft 6 in (1.98 m)	235 lb (107 kg)		Visayas

Coaches
Head coach
- (Philippines) Yeng Guiao (UP Diliman)
Assistant(s)
- (Philippines) Junel Baculi (Mapúa)
- (Philippines) Roehl Nadurata
- (Philippines) Johnny Tam

Legend
- (DP) Unsigned draft pick
- (FA) Free agent
- (S) Suspended
- Injured

=== Depth chart ===
Pos.	Starting 5	Bench 1	Reserve
C	Beau Belga	J. R. Quiñahan	Adonis Sta. Maria
PF	Shawn Daniels	Erick Rodriguez
SF	Arwind Santos	Richard Alonzo	Pocholo Villanueva
SG	Gary David	Egay Billones
PG	Wynne Arboleda	Marvin Cruz

== Philippine Cup ==
=== Eliminations ===
==== Standings ====
Pos	Team	W	L	PCT	GB	Qualification
1	Alaska Aces	12	6	.667	—	Advance to semifinals
2	Talk 'N Text Tropang Texters	11	7	.611	1	Advance to semifinals
3	Barangay Ginebra Kings	10	8	.556 (Note: Head-to-head differential: Barangay Ginebra +16, Rain or Shine −3, Sta. Lucia −13)	2	Advance to quarterfinals
4	Rain or Shine Elasto Painters	10	8	.556	2	Advance to quarterfinals
5	Sta. Lucia Realtors	10	8	.556	2	Advance to quarterfinals
6	San Miguel Beermen	9	9	.500	3	Advance to wildcard round
7	Purefoods Tender Juicy Giants	8	10	.444 (Note: Head-to-head record: Purefoods 2–0 Air21)	4	Advance to wildcard round
8	Air21 Express	8	10	.444	4	Advance to wildcard round
9	Coca-Cola Tigers	7	11	.389	5	Advance to wildcard round
10	Red Bull Barako	5	13	.278	7	

Source: PBA.ph

==== Game log ====
2009 PBA Philippine Cup game log
October

Game	Date	Opponent	Score	High points	High rebounds	High assists	Location Attendance	Record
1	October 5	Rain or Shine	102–120	De Ocampo (21)	De Ocampo (13)	De Ocampo (6)	Cuneta Astrodome	0–1
2	October 9	Talk 'N Text	101–112	David (23)	Quiñahan (17)	Quiñahan, Arboleda (4)	Ynares Sports Arena	0–2
3	October 12	Ginebra	92–101	Santos (23)	De Ocampo (11)	Arboleda (6)	Araneta Coliseum	0–3
4	October 17	Coca-Cola	95-84	Santos (25)	De Ocampo (16)	Cruz (5)	Araneta Coliseum	1–3
5	October 24	Sta. Lucia	107-83	Santos (21)	Santos, Quiñahan (9)	Cruz (5)	Ynares Center	2–3
6	October 29	Alaska	109-107	Santos (25)	Santos (14)	Arboleda, Cruz (5)	Araneta Coliseum	3–3
7	October 31	Purefoods	105–108	Se, Arboleda (25)	De Ocampo (13)	David (6)	Araneta Coliseum	3–4

November

Game	Date	Opponent	Score	High points	High rebounds	High assists	Location Attendance	Record
8	November 5	San Miguel	129–130	David (36)	Santos (16)	Arboleda (8)	Araneta Coliseum	3–5
9	November 8	Rain or Shine	106-103	David (27)	Kramer (15)	David (5)	Lucena City	4–5
10	November 15	Coca-Cola	111-101	Santos (26)	De Ocampo (13)	Arboleda (10)	Cuneta Astrodome	5–5
11	November 21	Red Bull	92-89	Canaleta (20)	Canaleta, De Ocampo (11)	De Ocampo (5)	Araneta Coliseum	6–5
12	November 26	San Miguel	78–98	Santos (17)	De Ocampo (10)	Cruz (5)	Araneta Coliseum	6–6
13	November 29	Purefoods	88–96	David (22)	Canaleta (11)	Arboleda (6)	Tacloban City	6–7

December

Game	Date	Opponent	Score	High points	High rebounds	High assists	Location Attendance	Record
14	December 5	Ginebra	102-84	David (24)	De Ocampo (11)	Cruz (6)	Araneta Coliseum	7–7
15	December 7	Sta. Lucia	97-88	De Ocampo (23)	Canaleta (10)	De Ocampo (7)	Araneta Coliseum	8–7
16	December 12	Red Bull	88–98	De Ocampo (21)	Canaleta (10)	De Ocampo (6)	Araneta Coliseum	8–8
17	December 19	Alaska	65–76	Intal (17)	Arboleda (8)	Quiñahan (3)	Ynares Center	8–9
18	December 25	Talk 'N Text	108–109	David (23)	Quiñahan (9)	Allado (6)	Araneta Coliseum	8–10

2008–09 schedule

=== Playoffs ===
==== Game log ====
2009 PBA Philippine Cup playoffs game log
Wildcard

Game	Date	Opponent	Score	High points	High rebounds	High assists	Location Attendance	Record
1	December 28	Purefoods	94-82	David (20)	Santos (11)	Arboleda (6)	Araneta Coliseum	Advanced
2	January 4	San Miguel	86–105	David (31)	Allado (14)	Quiñahan (3)	Araneta Coliseum	Eliminated

2008–09 schedule

=== Statistics ===
Legend
GP	Games played	GS	Games started	MPG	Minutes per game
FGM	Field-goal made	FGA	Field-goal attempts	FG%	Field-goal percentage
3PM	3-point field-goal made	3PA	3-point field-goal attempts	3P%	3-point field-goal percentage
FTM	Free-throw made	FTA	Free-throw attempts	FT%	Free-throw percentage
RPG	Rebounds per game	APG	Assists per game	SPG	Steals per game
BPG	Blocks per game	TOV	Turnovers per game	PPG	Points per game

Player Stats as of November 29, 2008. 10:00 p.m. PHI Time

Player	GP	MPG	FG%	3FG%	FT%	RPG	APG	SPG	BPG	PPG
Wynne Arboleda	12	28.8	.368	.343	.696	4.1	4.7	1.7	0.1	11.6
Egay Billones	11	12.1	.390	.316	.571	0.8	1.4	0.4	0.0	6.0
Niño Canaleta	12	22.4	.333	.243	.895	3.8	1.4	0.3	0.4	7.0
Marvin Cruz	12	11.5	.343	.100	.842	1.2	2.8	0.7	0.0	3.4
Gary David	12	32.3	.393	.250	.773	4.5	2.1	0.8	0.1	18.2
Ranidel De Ocampo	12	36.3	.455	.381	.630	10.5	3.5	1.2	0.4	12.9
JC Intal	10	13.2	.393	.210	0.308	3.0	1.6	0.8	0.3	5.2
Doug Kramer	11	18.4	.459	.250	.769	5.4	0.8	0.2	0.6	6.1
J.R. Quiñahan	12	22.6	.575	.000	0.529	6.8	1.5	0.5	1.3	8.4
Arwind Santos	11	33.6	.444	.320	.771	8.9	0.9	1.4	1.7	17.9
Adonis Santa Maria	8	7.8	.600	.667	.500	1.0	0.3	0.1	0.0	2.1
Homer Se	7	22.1	.514	.100	.611	5.4	1.3	1.1	1.0	12.3
Pocholo Villanueva	7	5.3	.182	.000	.000	0.3	0.4	0.0	0.1	0.5

== Fiesta Conference ==
=== Eliminations ===
==== Standings ====
Pos	Team	W	L	PCT	GB	Qualification
1	San Miguel Beermen	11	3	.786	—	Advance to semifinals
2	Barangay Ginebra Kings	8	6	.571 (Note: Head-to-head differential: Rain or Shine +15, Barangay Ginebra −7, Burger King −8; second seed playoff: Barangay Ginebra 114–71 Rain or Shine)	3	Advance to semifinals
3	Rain or Shine Elasto Painters	8	6	.571	3	Twice-to-beat in the wildcard round
4	Burger King Whoppers	8	6	.571	3	Twice-to-beat in the wildcard round
5	Sta. Lucia Realtors	7	7	.500 (Note: Head-to-head differential: Sta. Lucia +7, Purefoods +3, Talk 'N Text −10)	4	Knockout in the wildcard round
6	Purefoods Tender Juicy Giants	7	7	.500	4	Knockout in the wildcard round
7	Talk 'N Text Tropang Texters	7	7	.500	4	Knockout in the wildcard round
8	Coca-Cola Tigers	6	8	.429 (Note: Eighth seed playoff: Coca-Cola 81–74 Alaska)	5	Knockout in the wildcard round
9	Alaska Aces	6	8	.429	5	Twice-to-win in the wildcard round
10	Barako Bull Energy Boosters	2	12	.143	9	Twice-to-win in the wildcard round

Source: PBA.ph

==== Game log ====
2009 PBA Fiesta Conference game log
February

Game	Date	Opponent	Score	High points	High rebounds	High assists	Location Attendance	Record
1	February 28	Sta. Lucia	96-87	David (16)	Daniels, Santos (13)	David, Daniels (3)	Dumaguete	1–0

March

Game	Date	Opponent	Score	High points	High rebounds	High assists	Location Attendance	Record
2	March 6	Ginebra	110-106	Santos (20)	Daniels (10)	Daniels (8)	Cuneta Astrodome	2–0
3	March 8	San Miguel	105–114	Santos (26)	Daniels (9)	Arboleda, M. Cruz, Villanueva (5)	Araneta Coliseum	2–1
4	March 14	Talk 'N Text	114–117	David (25)	Daniels (16)	Arboleda (9)	Muntinlupa	2–2
5	March 18	Barako Bull	123-110	Santos (22)	Daniels (13)	M. Cruz (5)	Araneta Coliseum	3–2
6	March 20	Coca-Cola	127-109	David (26)	Daniels (10)	Arboleda (5)	Araneta Coliseum	4–2
7	March 25	Rain or Shine	112–118	David (27)	Daniels (7)	David, Baguio (5)	Araneta Coliseum	4–3

April

Game	Date	Opponent	Score	High points	High rebounds	High assists	Location Attendance	Record
8	April 15	Purefoods	78–82	Santos (18)	Daniels (7)	Daniels (5)	Araneta Coliseum	4–4
9	April 20	Ginebra	94–100	Billiones (27)	Daniels (15)	Daniels (7)	Cuneta Astrodome	4–5
10	April 30	Barako Bull	99-89	David (30)	Daniels (11)	Daniels, David (4)	Ynares Sports Arena	5–5

May

Game	Date	Opponent	Score	High points	High rebounds	High assists	Location Attendance	Record
11	May 3	Alaska Aces	106-88	Santos (31)	Daniels (17)	Arboleda, Daniels (5)	Cuneta Astrodome	6–5
12	May 10	San Miguel	107-105	David (23)	Daniels (19)	Daniels (4)	Araneta Coliseum	7–5
13	May 13	Talk 'N Text	129–135	Daniels (27)	Daniels (15)	Arboleda(10)	Cuneta Astrodome	7–6
14	May 17	Purefoods	96-86	Santos (21)	Daniels (21)	Arboleda(5)	Cuneta Astrodome	8–6

2008–09 schedule

== Awards and records ==
=== Records ===
Note: Air21 Express/Burger King Whoppers Records Only

Record	Stat	Holder	Date/s
Most points in one game	36	Gary David vs. San Miguel Beermen	November 5, 2008
Most points in one half	30	Gary David vs. San Miguel Beermen	November 5, 2008
Most points in one quarter	19	Gary David vs. San Miguel Beermen	November 5, 2008
Most rebounds in one game	17	J.R. Quiñahan vs. Talk 'N Text Tropang Texters	October 9, 2008
Most assists in one game	10	Wynne Arboleda vs. Coca-Cola Tigers	November 15, 2008
Most blocks in one game	6	J.R. Quiñahan vs. Brgy. Ginebra Kings	December 5, 2008
Most steals in one game	5	Wynne Arboleda vs. Purefoods TJ Giants	November 29, 2008
Most minutes played in one game	44	Arwind Santos vs. Purefoods TJ Giants	October 31, 2008

== Transactions ==
=== Trades ===
Traded	to	For
Mark Borboran	Alaska Aces	J.R. Quiñahan
Ranidel de Ocampo	Talk 'N Text Tropang Texters	Don Allado and 2011 First Round Pick
2010 and 2011 First Round Pick	Red Bull Barako	Cyrus Baguio
Don Allado and Nino Canaleta	Purefoods Tender Juicy Giants	Beau Belga and Richard Alonzo
JC Intal, Doug Kramer, Chico Lanete	Barangay Ginebra Kings	2012 and 2013 First Round Pick

=== Free agents ===
==== Additions ====
Player	Signed	Former team
Adonis Santa Maria	October	Rain or Shine Elasto Painters

==== Subtractions ====
Player	Signed	New team
Ervin Sotto	October	Alaska Aces
