= 2008–09 Barangay Ginebra Kings season =

- Head coach: Jong Uichico
- General Manager: Samboy Lim
- Owner(s): Ginebra San Miguel, Inc.

Philippine Cup results
- Record: 10–8 (55.6%)
- Place: 3rd
- Playoff finish: Quarterfinals (by San Miguel 2–1)

Fiesta Conference results
- Record: 8–6 (57.1%)
- Place: 2nd
- Playoff finish: Finals (by San Miguel 4–3)

Barangay Ginebra Kings seasons

The 2008–09 Barangay Ginebra Kings season was the 30th season of the franchise in the Philippine Basketball Association (PBA). The head coach for the season was Jong Uichico, and Eric Menk, David Noel, Ronald Tubid, Jayjay Helterbrand, and Paul Artadi played the starting lineup. The Kings finished third in the Philippine Cup. The Kings also added Junjun Cabatu as a free agent–before playing for the Kings, he played for the Alaska Aces.

== Key dates ==
- August 30: The 2008 PBA Draft took place in Fort Bonifacio, Taguig.
- September 1: The free agency period started.

== Roster ==
2008–09 Barangay Ginebra Kings roster
Players

Pos.	#	POB	Name	Height	Weight	DOB (YYYY–MM–DD)	From
PG	1	(Philippines)	Chico Lanete	6 ft 0 in (1.83 m)	180 lb (82 kg)		Lyceum
C	2	(Philippines)	Billy Mamaril	6 ft 6 in (1.98 m)	220 lb (100 kg)		Bakersfield
SG	3	(Philippines)	Cyrus Baguio	6 ft 2 in (1.88 m)	180 lb (82 kg)		UST
C	4	(United States)	Rafi Reavis	6 ft 8 in (2.03 m)	210 lb (95 kg)		Coppin State
PG	5	(Philippines)	Macky Escalona	5 ft 11 in (1.80 m)	180 lb (82 kg)		Ateneo
SF	9	(Philippines)	JC Intal	6 ft 4 in (1.93 m)	185 lb (84 kg)		Ateneo
SG	10	(Philippines)	Junthy Valenzuela (injured)	6 ft 2 in (1.88 m)	185 lb (84 kg)		SCSIT
PG	13	(Philippines)	Jayjay Helterbrand	5 ft 11 in (1.80 m)	170 lb (77 kg)		Kentucky State
PG	16	(Philippines)	Paul Artadi	5 ft 9 in (1.75 m)	150 lb (68 kg)		UE
PF	18	(Philippines)	Doug Kramer	6 ft 5 in (1.96 m)	210 lb (95 kg)		Ateneo
PG	22	(United States)	Chris Pacana	6 ft 1 in (1.85 m)	200 lb (91 kg)		Saint Francis of Assisi
SF	27	(United States)	Willy Wilson	6 ft 3 in (1.91 m)	215 lb (98 kg)		De La Salle
C	30	(United States)	Eric Menk (C)	6 ft 6 in (1.98 m)	220 lb (100 kg)		Lake Superior State
SG	47	(Philippines)	Mark Caguioa (injured)	6 ft 1 in (1.85 m)	185 lb (84 kg)		Glendale CC (CA)
SG	71	(Philippines)	Ronald Tubid	6 ft 1 in (1.85 m)	175 lb (79 kg)		UE
SG	80	(Philippines)	Sunday Salvacion	6 ft 3 in (1.91 m)	190 lb (86 kg)		St. Benilde
C	98	(Philippines)	Homer Se	6 ft 6 in (1.98 m)	220 lb (100 kg)		San Sebastian
F	34	(United States)	Rod Nealy (I)	6 ft 6 in (1.98 m)	210 lb (95 kg)		Houston Baptist
F	34	(United States)	David Noel (I)	6 ft 5 in (1.96 m)	220 lb (100 kg)		North Carolina

Coaches
Head coach
- (Philippines) Jong Uichico (De La Salle)
Assistant(s)
- (Philippines) Art dela Cruz (San Sebastian)
- (Philippines) Marco Januz Sauler (De La Salle)
- (Philippines) Allan Caidic (UE)

Legend
- (DP) Unsigned draft pick
- (FA) Free agent
- (S) Suspended
- (I) Import
- Injured

== Philippine Cup ==
=== Eliminations ===
==== Standings ====
Pos	Team	W	L	PCT	GB	Qualification
1	Alaska Aces	12	6	.667	—	Advance to semifinals
2	Talk 'N Text Tropang Texters	11	7	.611	1	Advance to semifinals
3	Barangay Ginebra Kings	10	8	.556 (Note: Head-to-head differential: Barangay Ginebra +16, Rain or Shine −3, Sta. Lucia −13)	2	Advance to quarterfinals
4	Rain or Shine Elasto Painters	10	8	.556	2	Advance to quarterfinals
5	Sta. Lucia Realtors	10	8	.556	2	Advance to quarterfinals
6	San Miguel Beermen	9	9	.500	3	Advance to wildcard round
7	Purefoods Tender Juicy Giants	8	10	.444 (Note: Head-to-head record: Purefoods 2–0 Air21)	4	Advance to wildcard round
8	Air21 Express	8	10	.444	4	Advance to wildcard round
9	Coca-Cola Tigers	7	11	.389	5	Advance to wildcard round
10	Red Bull Barako	5	13	.278	7	

Source: PBA.ph

==== Game log ====
2008–09 PBA Philippine Cup game log
October

Game	Date	Opponent	Score	High points	High rebounds	High assists	Location Attendance	Record
1	October 8	Sta. Lucia	89-86	Helterbrand (26)	Menk (11)	Helterbrand, Artadi (3)	Araneta Coliseum	1–0
2	October 12	Air21	101-92	Cabatu (23)	Artadi (7)	Artadi (7)	Araneta Coliseum	2–0
3	October 19	Red Bull	94–100	Helterbrand (22)	Menk (10)	Artadi (5)	Araneta Coliseum	2–1
4	October 22	San Miguel	89–118	Helterbrand (15)	Crisano (8)	Artadi (5)	Araneta Coliseum	2–2
5	October 26	Purefoods	81–92	Salvacion (17)	Menk (10)	Helterbrand, Artadi (4)	Araneta Coliseum	2–3

November

Game	Date	Opponent	Score	High points	High rebounds	High assists	Location Attendance	Record
6	November 2	Alaska	84–93	Helterbrand (30)	Wilson (18)	Artadi (6)	Araneta Coliseum	2–4
7	November 5	Rain or Shine	102–106	Menk (24)	Menk (12)	Helterbrand (6)	Araneta Coliseum	2–5
8	November 8	Coca-Cola	81-77	Helterbrand (28)	Pacana (10)	Helterbrand (4)	Lucena City	3–5
9	November 12	Talk 'N Text	90–103	Tubid (17)	Salvacion, Tubid (9)	Helterbrand (5)	Cuneta Astrodome	3–6
10	November 16	Purefoods	90-80	Helterbrand (23)	Menk (12)	Helterbrand (8)	Cuneta Astrodome	4–6
11	November 22	Sta. Lucia	93-81	Salvacion (22)	Wilson, Menk (9)	Artadi (8)	San Juan Arena	5–6
12	November 27	Coca-Cola	84-77	Tubid (22)	Tubid (10)	Artadi (4)	Olivarez College Gym	6–6

December

Game	Date	Opponent	Score	High points	High rebounds	High assists	Location Attendance	Record
13	December 3	Red Bull	83-76	Tubid, Salvacion (15)	Tubid (11)	Artadi (6)	Araneta Coliseum	7–6
14	December 5	Air21	102-84	Mamaril, Crisano (15)	Tubid (10)	Artadi (4)	Araneta Coliseum	7–7
15	December 13	Alaska	84-82	Menk (17)	Menk (11)	Helterbrand (6)	Cagayan de Oro	8–7
16	December 17	Talk 'N Text	85–109	Mamaril (17)	Menk (10)	Helterbrand, Artadi (4)	Araneta Coliseum	8–8
17	December 20	San Miguel	87-82	Helterbrand (35)			Batangas City	9–8
18	December 25	Rain or Shine	63-58	Menk (15)			Araneta Coliseum	10–8

2008–09 schedule

== Fiesta Conference ==
=== Eliminations ===
==== Standings ====
Pos	Team	W	L	PCT	GB	Qualification
1	San Miguel Beermen	11	3	.786	—	Advance to semifinals
2	Barangay Ginebra Kings	8	6	.571 (Note: Head-to-head differential: Rain or Shine +15, Barangay Ginebra −7, Burger King −8; second seed playoff: Barangay Ginebra 114–71 Rain or Shine)	3	Advance to semifinals
3	Rain or Shine Elasto Painters	8	6	.571	3	Twice-to-beat in the wildcard round
4	Burger King Whoppers	8	6	.571	3	Twice-to-beat in the wildcard round
5	Sta. Lucia Realtors	7	7	.500 (Note: Head-to-head differential: Sta. Lucia +7, Purefoods +3, Talk 'N Text −10)	4	Knockout in the wildcard round
6	Purefoods Tender Juicy Giants	7	7	.500	4	Knockout in the wildcard round
7	Talk 'N Text Tropang Texters	7	7	.500	4	Knockout in the wildcard round
8	Coca-Cola Tigers	6	8	.429 (Note: Eighth seed playoff: Coca-Cola 81–74 Alaska)	5	Knockout in the wildcard round
9	Alaska Aces	6	8	.429	5	Twice-to-win in the wildcard round
10	Barako Bull Energy Boosters	2	12	.143	9	Twice-to-win in the wildcard round

Source: PBA.ph

==== Game log ====
2009 PBA Fiesta Conference game log
March

Game	Date	Opponent	Score	High points	High rebounds	High assists	Location Attendance	Record
1	March 4	Coca Cola	110-103	Nealy (42)	Nealy (23)	Nealy (9)	Ynares Center	1–0
2	March 6	Burger King	106–110	Nealy (26)	Nealy (20)	Helterbrand (6)	Cuneta Astrodome	1–1
3	March 11	Sta. Lucia	76–80	Nealy (18)	Nealy (14)	Nealy (5)	Cuneta Astrodome	1–2
4	March 18	Rain or Shine	93–107	Nealy (32)	Nealy (11)	Helterbrand (7)	Araneta Coliseum	1–3
5	March 20	Alaska Aces	82-81	Nealy (23)	Nealy, Wilson (12)	Helterbrand (7)	Araneta Coliseum	1–4
6	March 25	San Miguel	85–90	Helterbrand (24)	Nealy (15)	Nealy (6)	Araneta Coliseum	1–5
7	March 28	Barako Bull	111-103	Nealy, Tubid (29)	Nealy (17)	Nealy (6)	Panabo City Sports Center	2–5

April

Game	Date	Opponent	Score	High points	High rebounds	High assists	Location Attendance	Record
8	April 17	Rain or Shine	94-89	Menk (24)	Menk (9)	Helterbrand (9)	Araneta Coliseum	3–5
9	April 20	Burger King	100-94	Noel, Menk (22)	Noel (17)	Noel (10)	Cuneta Astrodome	4–5

May

Game	Date	Opponent	Score	High points	High rebounds	High assists	Location Attendance	Record
10	May 1	Talk 'N Text	90–97	Noel (21)	Noel (19)	Noel (7)	Araneta Coliseum	5–5
11	May 8	Sta. Lucia	101-98	Noel (23)	Noel (12)	Helterbrand (6)	Ynares Center	6–5
12	May 10	Purefoods	116-109	Noel (30)	Noel (11)	Noel (7)	Araneta Coliseum	7–5
13	May 20	Coca Cola	112-85	Tubid (20)	Noel (18)	Noel (5)	Araneta Coliseum	8–5
14	May 22	Alaska	75–76	Helterbrand (18)	Noel (21)	Noel (6)	Araneta Coliseum	8–6

2008–09 schedule

=== Playoffs ===
2009 PBA Fiesta Conference playoffs game log
Tiebreaker

Game	Date	Opponent	Score	High points	High rebounds	High assists	Location Attendance	Record
1	May 24	Rain or Shine	114-71	Tubid (18)	Reavis (8)	Helterbrand (4)	Ynares Center	n/a

Semifinals

Game	Date	Opponent	Score	High points	High rebounds	High assists	Location Attendance	Record
1	June 17	Rain or Shine	95–101	Tubid (21)	Noel (9)	Helterbrand (7)	Araneta Coliseum	0–1
2	June 19	Rain or Shine	103-98	Helterbrand (34)	Noel (8)	Noel (6)	Cuneta Astrodome	1–1
3	June 21	Rain or Shine	88–94	Helterbrand (17)	Noel (17)	Helterbrand (6)	Araneta Coliseum	1–2
4	June 24	Rain or Shine	86-70	Noel (28)	Noel (17)	Helterbrand (3)	Araneta Coliseum	2–2
5	June 26	Rain or Shine	96-85	Helterbrand (21)	Noel (10)	Noel (6)	Araneta Coliseum	3–2
6	June 28	Rain or Shine	108-100	Noel, Tubid (23)	Noel, Tubid (10)	Noel (7)	Araneta Coliseum	4–2

Finals

Game	Date	Opponent	Score	High points	High rebounds	High assists	Location Attendance	Record
1	July 1	San Miguel	102-96	Helterbrand (21)	Noel (8)	Helterbrand (7)	Araneta Coliseum	1–0
2	July 3	San Miguel	78–95	Noel (20)	Noel (8)	Helterbrand (4)	Araneta Coliseum	1–1
3	July 5	San Miguel	116-103	Noel (32)	Noel (10)	Noel (11)	Araneta Coliseum	2–1
4	July 8	San Miguel	104–106	Helterbrand, Noel (22)	Noel (18)	Helterbrand (6)	Araneta Coliseum	2–2
5	July 13	San Miguel	106-98	Noel (29)	Noel (11)	Helterbrand, Noel (4)	Araneta Coliseum	3–2
6	July 15	San Miguel	84–98	Noel (16)	Noel (11)	Noel (7)	Araneta Coliseum	3–3
7	July 17	San Miguel	79–90	Helterbrand (25)	Noel (15)	Helterbrand (7)	Araneta Coliseum	3–4

2008–09 schedule

== Statistics ==
Legend
GP	Games played	GS	Games started	MPG	Minutes per game
FGM	Field-goal made	FGA	Field-goal attempts	FG%	Field-goal percentage
3PM	3-point field-goal made	3PA	3-point field-goal attempts	3P%	3-point field-goal percentage
FTM	Free-throw made	FTA	Free-throw attempts	FT%	Free-throw percentage
RPG	Rebounds per game	APG	Assists per game	SPG	Steals per game
BPG	Blocks per game	TOV	Turnovers per game	PPG	Points per game

=== Philippine Cup ===
Player Stats as of January 29, 2008. 5:30 p.m. PHI Time

Player	GP	MPG	FG%	3FG%	FT%	PPG	RPG	APG	SPG	BPG
Johnny Abarrientos	1	13.0	.750	.500	1.000	8.0	0.0	2.0	0.0	0.0
J.R. Aquino	1	2.0	.000	.000	.000	0.0	0.0	0.0	0.0	0.0
Paul Artadi	21	26.1	.342	.266	.652	8.8	3.1	4.2	1.3	0.1
Junjun Cabatu	20	16.9	.419	.391	.714	6.9	4.3	1.2	0.3	0.1
Mark Caguioa	0	0	.000	.000	.000	0	0	0	0	0
Alex Crisano	19	11.6	.403	.000	.600	4.5	3.3	0.4	0.2	0.3
Macky Escalona	21	7.9	.447	.000	.455	2.2	0.7	0.5	0.2	0.0
Jayjay Helterbrand	18	35.9	.408	.357	.750	18.5	3.7	4.9	1.2	0.1
Billy Mamaril	16	16.4	.506	.000	.694	6.9	4.1	0.4	0.5	0.8
Eric Menk	20	25.8	.387	.143	.574	8.1	7.7	1.6	0.4	0.1
Chris Pacana	16	16.5	.388	.300	0.682	4.4	4.1	1.6	1.0	0.1
Rafi Reavis	5	18.4	.400	.000	.667	3.2	5.8	1.6	0.4	0.6
Sunday Salvacion	21	25.5	.349	.316	.500	10.9	4.5	1.1	0.1	0.1
Ronald Tubid	20	28.7	.400	.346	.694	11.9	5.5	2.5	0.4	1.0
Junthy Valenzuela	12	17.5	.313	.259	.778	5.9	3.1	1.7	0.6	0.0
Willy Wilson	21	27.0	.548	.000	.692	5.7	6.2	1.4	0.6	0.3

== Awards and records ==
=== Records ===
Note: Barangay Ginebra Kings Records Only

Record	Stat	Holder	Date/s
Most points in one game	35	Jayjay Helterbrand vs. San Miguel Beermen	December 20, 2008
Most rebounds in one game	18	Willy Wilson vs. Alaska Aces	November 2, 2008
Most assists in one game	8	Jayjay Helterbrand vs. Purefoods TJ Giants	November 16, 2008
Most assists in one game	8	Paul Artadi vs. Sta. Lucia Realtors	November 22, 2008
Most blocks in one game	6	J.R. Quiñahan vs. Brgy. Ginebra Kings	December 5, 2008
Most steals in one game	5	Wynne Arboleda vs. Purefoods TJ Giants	November 29, 2008
Most minutes played in one game	38	Jayjay Helterbrand vs. Alaska Aces	October 31, 2008
Most minutes played in one game	38	Paul Artadi vs. Coca-Cola Tigers	November 27, 2008

== Transactions ==
=== Trades ===
Traded	to	For
Michael Holper	Red Bull Barako	2010 First Round Pick

Traded	to	For
2012/2013 First Round Pick	Burger King Titans	JC Intal, Doug Kramer, Chico Lanete

=== Free Agents ===
==== Additions ====
Player	Signed	Former team
Junjun Cabatu	October	Alaska Aces
