= 2008–09 Rain or Shine Elasto Painters season =

- Head coach: Caloy Garcia

Philippine Cup results
- Record: 10–8 (55.6%)
- Place: 4th
- Playoff finish: Quarterfinals (by Sta. Lucia 2–3)

Fiesta Conference results
- Record: 8–6 (57.1%)
- Place: 3rd
- Playoff finish: Semifinals (by Ginebra 2–4)

Rain or Shine Elasto Painters seasons

The 2008–09 Rain or Shine Elasto Painters season was the 3rd season of the franchise in the Philippine Basketball Association (PBA).

The team's notable move was drafting their future star Gabe Norwood of George Mason University. The team also drafted La Salle point guard TY Tang. They also traded the last year's first pick Joe Devance to Alaska Aces for Sol Mercado and Eddie Laure.

The team reached the semifinals for the first time in franchise history in 2009 Fiesta Conference, but lost to Ginebra.

== Key dates ==
- August 31: The 2008 PBA draft took place in Fort Bonifacio, Taguig.

== Draft picks ==
Round	Pick	Player	Height	Position	Nationality	College
1	1	Gabe Norwood	6 ft. 5 in.	Shooting guarrd	Philippines	George Mason
2	12	Tyrone Tang	5 ft. 7 in.	Point guard	Philippines	De La Salle

== Roster ==
2008–09 Rain or Shine Elasto Painters roster
Players

Pos.	#	POB	Name	Height	Weight	DOB (YYYY–MM–DD)	From
PG	1	(Philippines)	Tyrone Tang	5 ft 7 in (1.70 m)	135 lb (61 kg)		De La Salle
F	2	(Philippines)	Eddie Laure	6 ft 4 in (1.93 m)	195 lb (88 kg)		Adamson
G	3	(United States)	Solomon Mercado	6 ft 0 in (1.83 m)	195 lb (88 kg)		Biola
F	5	(United States)	Rob Wainwright	6 ft 5 in (1.96 m)	200 lb (91 kg)		Solano CC
G/F	6	(Philippines)	Jireh Ibañes	6 ft 3 in (1.91 m)	182 lb (83 kg)		UP Diliman
F/C	8	(Philippines)	Jay-R Reyes	6 ft 7 in (2.01 m)	215 lb (98 kg)		UP Diliman
G	9	(Philippines)	Gherome Ejercito	6 ft 2 in (1.88 m)			Adamson
G/F	10	(United States)	Gabe Norwood	6 ft 5 in (1.96 m)	190 lb (86 kg)		George Mason
G	11	(United States)	Don Dulay	5 ft 8 in (1.73 m)	150 lb (68 kg)		El Camino
G	18	(Philippines)	Ryan Araña	6 ft 1 in (1.85 m)	180 lb (82 kg)		De La Salle
F	30	(Philippines)	Allan Salangsang	6 ft 5 in (1.96 m)			Letran
C	40	(Philippines)	Mark Andaya	6 ft 8 in (2.03 m)	220 lb (100 kg)		Letran
G	44	(United States)	Denver Lopez	6 ft 2 in (1.88 m)	179 lb (81 kg)		Cal State Fullerton

Coaches
Head coach
- (Philippines) Caloy Garcia (St. Benilde)
Assistant(s)
- (Philippines) Richard del Rosario (De La Salle)
- (United States) Alex Compton
- (Philippines) Mike Buendia
- (Philippines) Jay Legacion

Legend
- (DP) Unsigned draft pick
- (FA) Free agent
- (S) Suspended
- Injured

== Results ==
=== Philippine Cup ===
==== Team standings ====
Pos	Team	W	L	PCT	GB	Qualification
1	Alaska Aces	12	6	.667	—	Advance to semifinals
2	Talk 'N Text Tropang Texters	11	7	.611	1	Advance to semifinals
3	Barangay Ginebra Kings	10	8	.556 (Note: Head-to-head differential: Barangay Ginebra +16, Rain or Shine −3, Sta. Lucia −13)	2	Advance to quarterfinals
4	Rain or Shine Elasto Painters	10	8	.556	2	Advance to quarterfinals
5	Sta. Lucia Realtors	10	8	.556	2	Advance to quarterfinals
6	San Miguel Beermen	9	9	.500	3	Advance to wildcard round
7	Purefoods Tender Juicy Giants	8	10	.444 (Note: Head-to-head record: Purefoods 2–0 Air21)	4	Advance to wildcard round
8	Air21 Express	8	10	.444	4	Advance to wildcard round
9	Coca-Cola Tigers	7	11	.389	5	Advance to wildcard round
10	Red Bull Barako	5	13	.278	7	

Source: PBA.ph

==== Schedule ====
	Round 1									Round 2								
Team ╲ Game	1	2	3	4	5	6	7	8	9	10	11	12	13	14	15	16	17	18
Air21 Express	ROS	TNT	BGK	Coke	SLR	ALA	PF	SMB	ROS	Coke	RBB	SMB	PF	BGK	SLR	RBB	ALA	TNT
Alaska Aces	SMB	Coke	RBB	ROS	TNT	A21	BGK	SLR	PF	SMB	ROS	TNT	SLR	Coke	RBB	BGK	A21	PF
Barangay Ginebra Kings	SLR	A21	RBB	SMB	PF	ALA	ROS	Coke	TNT	PF	SLR	Coke	RBB	A21	ALA	TNT	SMB	ROS
Coca-Cola Tigers	TNT	ALA	PF	A21	SLR	ROS	RBB	BGK	SMB	A21	PF	ROS	BGK	ALA	TNT	SMB	SLR	RBB
Purefoods Tender Juicy Giants	RBB	SMB	Coke	SLR	ROS	BGK	A21	TNT	ALA	RBB	BGK	Coke	SMB	A21	ROS	SLR	TNT	ALA
Rain or Shine Elasto Painters	A21	RBB	SMB	ALA	PF	Coke	TNT	BGK	A21	SLR	ALA	Coke	RBB	SLR	PF	TNT	SMB	BGK
Red Bull Barako	PF	ROS	ALA	BGK	SMB	TNT	Coke	SLR	PF	TNT	A21	ROS	BGK	SMB	ALA	A21	Coke	SLR
Sta. Lucia Realtors	BGK	TNT	PF	Coke	A21	SMB	ALA	RBB	ROS	SMB	BGK	TNT	ALA	ROS	A21	PF	Coke	RBB
San Miguel Beermen	ALA	PF	ROS	TNT	BGK	RBB	SLR	A21	Coke	ALA	SLR	PF	A21	TNT	RBB	Coke	ROS	BGK
Talk 'N Text Phone Pals	Coke	A21	SLR	SMB	ALA	RBB	ROS	PF	BGK	RBB	ALA	SLR	SMB	Coke	ROS	PF	BGK	A21

= Win; = OT win; = Loss; = OT loss

==== Bracket ====
Wildcard phase (Single elimination)
7	Purefoods	82
8	Air21	94
6	San Miguel	99
9	Coca-Cola	89

Wildcard phase (Single elimination)
8	Air21	86
6	San Miguel	105

Quarterfinals (Best-of-3)
3	Ginebra	1
6	San Miguel	2
4	Rain or Shine	0
5	Sta. Lucia	2

Semifinals (Best-of-7)
2	Talk 'N Text	4
6	San Miguel	2
1	Alaska	4
5	Sta. Lucia	2

Finals (Best-of-7)
2	Talk 'N Text	4
1	Alaska	3
Third place
6	San Miguel	97
5	Sta. Lucia (OT)	99

==== Quarterfinals: (4) Rain or Shine vs (5) Sta. Lucia ====
C/S9

January 7

Sta. Lucia Realtors 101, Rain or Shine Elasto Painters 84

Araneta Coliseum, Quezon City

C/S9

January 9

Sta. Lucia Realtors 92, Rain or Shine Elasto Painters 85
Sta. Lucia wins series, 2–0

Cuneta Astrodome, Pasay

In their first playoff appearance since joining the league in 2006, the Elasto Painters were overwhelmed in Game 1 by the defending champions, who played with the comebacking Ryan Reyes who just came from injury. Fracas involving Rain or Shine's Gabe Norwood and Solomon Mercado at the end of the first game caused Norwood to be suspended in Game 2, and Mercado on Game 3 if it happens. The short-handed Elasto Painters wound up short in Game 2 as they were eliminated.

=== Fiesta Conference ===
==== Standings ====
Pos	Team	W	L	PCT	GB	Qualification
1	San Miguel Beermen	11	3	.786	—	Advance to semifinals
2	Barangay Ginebra Kings	8	6	.571 (Note: Head-to-head differential: Rain or Shine +15, Barangay Ginebra −7, Burger King −8; second seed playoff: Barangay Ginebra 114–71 Rain or Shine)	3	Advance to semifinals
3	Rain or Shine Elasto Painters	8	6	.571	3	Twice-to-beat in the wildcard round
4	Burger King Whoppers	8	6	.571	3	Twice-to-beat in the wildcard round
5	Sta. Lucia Realtors	7	7	.500 (Note: Head-to-head differential: Sta. Lucia +7, Purefoods +3, Talk 'N Text −10)	4	Knockout in the wildcard round
6	Purefoods Tender Juicy Giants	7	7	.500	4	Knockout in the wildcard round
7	Talk 'N Text Tropang Texters	7	7	.500	4	Knockout in the wildcard round
8	Coca-Cola Tigers	6	8	.429 (Note: Eighth seed playoff: Coca-Cola 81–74 Alaska)	5	Knockout in the wildcard round
9	Alaska Aces	6	8	.429	5	Twice-to-win in the wildcard round
10	Barako Bull Energy Boosters	2	12	.143	9	Twice-to-win in the wildcard round

Source: PBA.ph

==== Results ====
- Results above and to the left of the gray boxes are first round games; those below and to the right are second round games.

Team	ALA	BBE	BGK	BKW	COKE	PF	ROS	SMB	SLR	TNT
Alaska Aces		90–92	82–81	88–106	85–89	94–84	94–96	89–93	90–100	122–124
Barako Bull Energy Boosters	90–100		103–111	110–123	103–106	92–96	83–93	92–99	91–100	135–132
Barangay Ginebra Kings	75–76			106–110	110–103	107–105	93–107	80–95	76–80	97–90
Burger King Whoppers		99–89	94–100		127–109	78–82	112–118	105–114	96–84	105–118
Coca-Cola Tigers		120–106	85–122			89–80	94–91*	91–106	88–79	111–133
Purefoods Tender Juicy Giants	74–80			86–96	92–85		102–94*	103–122	93–91	131–121
Rain or Shine Elasto Painters		103–97	89–94			110–90		95–102	100–109	96–102
San Miguel Beermen	91–84			105–107*	89–105		72–82		92–90	98–87
Sta. Lucia Realtors		98–88	98–101			104–95	90–82	92–98		106–100
Talk 'N Text Tropang Texters	115–122*			129–135**	103–00		116–118*		97–91	

Legend: Blue = left column team win; Red = top row team win.
Matches with lighter background shading were decided after overtime.

==== Second seed playoff ====
C/S9

May 24

2nd seed

Rain or Shine Elasto Painters 71, Barangay Ginebra Kings 114

Ynares Center, Antipolo, Rizal

==== Bracket ====
Wildcard phase
(#4 twice-to-beat)
4	Burger King	96
9	Alaska	90
(Single-elimination)
5	Sta. Lucia	94
8	Coca-Cola	88
(#3 twice to beat)
3	Rain or Shine	96
10	Barako Bull	88
(Single-elimination)
6	Purefoods (2OT)	126
7	Talk 'N Text	123

Quarterfinals (Best-of-3)
4	Burger King	2
5	Sta. Lucia	1
3	Rain or Shine	2
6	Purefoods	1

Semifinals (Best-of-7)
1	San Miguel	4
4	Burger King	2
2	Ginebra	4
3	Rain or Shine	2

Finals (Best-of-7)
1	San Miguel	4
2	Ginebra	3
Third place playoff
4	Burger King	132
3	Rain or Shine	118

==== Wildcard phase ====
Note: Rain or Shine and Burger King possessed the twice to beat advantage but it was not used as their opponents failed to win to extend the series into a deciding game.

C/S9

May 27

Recap

Rain or Shine Elasto Painters 96, Barako Bull Energy Boosters 88

Araneta Coliseum, Quezon City

==== Quarterfinals: (3) Rain or Shine vs. (6) Purefoods ====
C/S9

May 31

Recap

Rain or Shine Elasto Painters 96, Purefoods Tender Juicy Giants 87

Araneta Coliseum, Quezon City

C/S9

June 3

Recap

Rain or Shine Elasto Painters 82, Purefoods Tender Juicy Giants 84

Araneta Coliseum, Quezon City

C/S9

June 14

Rain or Shine Elasto Painters 93, Purefoods Tender Juicy Giants 89
Rain or Shine wins series 2–1

Araneta Coliseum, Quezon City

==== Semifinals: (2) Barangay Ginebra vs (3) Rain or Shine ====
C/S9

June 17

Recap

Barangay Ginebra Kings 95, Rain or Shine Elasto Painters 101

Araneta Coliseum, Quezon City

C/S9

June 19

Recap

Barangay Ginebra Kings 103, Rain or Shine Elasto Painters 98

Cuneta Astrodome, Pasay

C/S9

June 21

Recap

Barangay Ginebra Kings 88, Rain or Shine Elasto Painters 94

Araneta Coliseum, Quezon City

C/S9

June 24

Recap

Barangay Ginebra Kings 86, Rain or Shine Elasto Painters 70

Araneta Coliseum, Quezon City

C/S9

June 26

Recap

Barangay Ginebra Kings 96, Rain or Shine Elasto Painters 85

Araneta Coliseum, Quezon City

C/S9

June 28

Recap

Barangay Ginebra Kings 108, Rain or Shine Elasto Painters 100
Barangay Ginebra wins series, 4–2

Araneta Coliseum, Quezon City

==== Third place playoff ====
C/S9

July 1

Recap

Rain or Shine Elasto Painters 118, Burger King Whoppers 132

Araneta Coliseum, Quezon City

== Transactions ==
=== Trades ===
2008 post-draft	To Rain or Shine Sol Mercado, Eddie Laure, future picks	To Alaska Joe Devance

=== Imports recruited ===
Player	Debuted	Last game	Record
(United States) Charles Clark	March 1	March 7	1–1
(United States) Jai Lewis	March 12	July 1	13–9
