= 2008–09 Coca-Cola Tigers season =

- Head coach: Kenneth Duremdes
- General Manager: Bo Perasol
- Owner(s): Coca-Cola Bottlers Philippines, Inc.

Philippine Cup results
- Record: 7–11 (38.9%)
- Place: 9th
- Playoff finish: 1st wildcard round (lost to San Miguel 89–99)

Fiesta Conference results
- Record: 7–9 (43.8%)
- Place: N/A
- Playoff finish: wildcard (lost to Sta.Lucia 88–94)

Coca-Cola Tigers seasons

The 2008–09 Coca-Cola Tigers season was the 7th season of the franchise in the Philippine Basketball Association (PBA).

== Key dates ==
- August 30: The 2008 PBA Draft took place in Fort Bonifacio, Taguig.
- September 1: The free agency period started.

== Roster ==
2008–09 Coca-Cola Tigers roster
Players

Pos.	#	POB	Name	Height	Weight	DOB (YYYY–MM–DD)	From
PF	3	(United States)	Nic Belasco	6 ft 6 in (1.98 m)	210 lb (95 kg)		Notre Dame (MD)
SG	5	(Philippines)	R.J. Rizada	6 ft 2 in (1.88 m)	175 lb (79 kg)		Far Eastern
SG	6	(Philippines)	Cesar Catli	6 ft 3 in (1.91 m)	185 lb (84 kg)		Far Eastern
PF	7	(Philippines)	M.C. Caceres	6 ft 5 in (1.96 m)	205 lb (93 kg)		PSBA
PG	8	(Philippines)	Aries Dimaunahan	6 ft 0 in (1.83 m)	185 lb (84 kg)		UST
SG	9	(Philippines)	Ronjay Buenafe	6 ft 2 in (1.88 m)	190 lb (86 kg)		Emilio Aguinaldo
C	10	(Philippines)	Lawrence Bonus	6 ft 7 in (2.01 m)	205 lb (93 kg)		Saint Francis of Assisi
C	13	(Philippines)	Mark Telan	6 ft 7 in (2.01 m)	210 lb (95 kg)		De La Salle
SF	15	(Philippines)	Jason Misolas	6 ft 3 in (1.91 m)	200 lb (91 kg)		Letran
SG	18	(Philippines)	Leo Avenido	6 ft 2 in (1.88 m)	180 lb (82 kg)		Far Eastern
PG	21	(Philippines)	Ronjay Enrile	5 ft 11 in (1.80 m)	168 lb (76 kg)		Letran
PG	22	(United States)	Kalani Ferreria	6 ft 4 in (1.93 m)	200 lb (91 kg)		Moorpark
PF	24	(Philippines)	Ricky Calimag	6 ft 5 in (1.96 m)	210 lb (95 kg)		San Beda
SG	45	(Philippines)	Rodney Santos	6 ft 2 in (1.88 m)	175 lb (79 kg)		San Sebastian
PG	50	(Philippines)	Dale Singson	6 ft 0 in (1.83 m)	180 lb (82 kg)		UST
PG	55	(Philippines)	Alex Cabagnot	6 ft 0 in (1.83 m)	180 lb (82 kg)		Hawaiʻi–Hilo
SG	81	(Philippines)	Mark Macapagal	6 ft 2 in (1.88 m)	185 lb (84 kg)		San Sebastian
C	88	(United States)	Asi Taulava (C)	6 ft 9 in (2.06 m)	245 lb (111 kg)		BYU–Hawaii

Coaches
Head coach
- (Philippines) Kenneth Duremdes (Adamson)
Assistant(s)
- (Philippines) Bo Perasol (UP Diliman)
- (Philippines) George Ella (UE)

Legend
- (DP) Unsigned draft pick
- (FA) Free agent
- (S) Suspended
- Injured

== Depth chart ==
Pos.	Starting 5	Bench 1	Reserve	Inactive
C	Asi Taulava	Mark Telan	Lawrence Bonus
PF	James Penny	Ricky Calimag	Jason Misolas
SF	Nic Belasco	Cesar Catli		M.C. Caceres
SG	Ronjay Buenafe	Mark Macapagal	Rodney Santos
PG	Alex Cabagnot	Aries Dimaunahan	Ronjay Enrile	R.J. Rizada

== Philippine Cup ==
=== Standings ===
Pos	Team	W	L	PCT	GB	Qualification
1	Alaska Aces	12	6	.667	—	Advance to semifinals
2	Talk 'N Text Tropang Texters	11	7	.611	1	Advance to semifinals
3	Barangay Ginebra Kings	10	8	.556 (Note: Head-to-head differential: Barangay Ginebra +16, Rain or Shine −3, Sta. Lucia −13)	2	Advance to quarterfinals
4	Rain or Shine Elasto Painters	10	8	.556	2	Advance to quarterfinals
5	Sta. Lucia Realtors	10	8	.556	2	Advance to quarterfinals
6	San Miguel Beermen	9	9	.500	3	Advance to wildcard round
7	Purefoods Tender Juicy Giants	8	10	.444 (Note: Head-to-head record: Purefoods 2–0 Air21)	4	Advance to wildcard round
8	Air21 Express	8	10	.444	4	Advance to wildcard round
9	Coca-Cola Tigers	7	11	.389	5	Advance to wildcard round
10	Red Bull Barako	5	13	.278	7	

Source: PBA.ph

=== Game log ===
2008–09 PBA Philippine Cup game log
October

Game	Date	Opponent	Score	High points	High rebounds	High assists	Location Attendance	Record
1	October 4	Talk 'N Text	97–98	Buenafe (20)	Taulava (14)	Cabagnot (7)	Araneta Coliseum	0–1
2	October 11	Alaska	62–69	Taulava (21)	Taulava, Belasco (9)	Cabagnot (4)	Negros Occidental	0–2
3	October 15	Purefoods	103-102	Taulava, Belasco (20)	Telan (16)	Taulava (8)	Araneta Coliseum	1–2
4	October 17	Air21	84–95	Belasco (22)	Taulava (16)	Buenafe (7)	Araneta Coliseum	1–3
5	October 22	Sta. Lucia	82–83	Taulava (24)	Taulava (15)	Cabagnot, Belasco (4)	Araneta Coliseum	1–4
6	October 26	Rain or Shine	112-96	Taulava (30)	Belasco (13)	Cabagnot (8)	Araneta Coliseum	2–4

November

Game	Date	Opponent	Score	High points	High rebounds	High assists	Location Attendance	Record
7	November 2	Red Bull	97-92	Taulava (17)	Telan (10)	Cabagnot, Taulava (3)	Araneta Coliseum	3–4
8	November 8	Ginebra	77–81	Belasco (22)	Belasco (14)	Cabagnot (7)	Lucena City	3–5
9	November 12	San Miguel	86–89	Cabagnot, Telan (14)	Telan (11)	Cabagnot, Taulava (4)	Cuneta Astrodome	3–6
10	November 15	Air21	101–111	Cabagnot (19)	Taulava (25)	Cabagnot (11)	Cuneta Astrodome	3–7
11	November 21	Purefoods	93-72	Buenafe (18)	Taulava (12)	Cabagnot (5)	Araneta Coliseum	4–7
12	November 23	Rain or Shine	84-73	Taulava (16)	Telan (11)	Cabagnot (11)	Cuneta Astrodome	5–7
13	November 27	Ginebra	77–84	Telan (17)	Taulava (14)	Buenafe (3)	Olivarez Gym	5–8

December

Game	Date	Opponent	Score	High points	High rebounds	High assists	Location Attendance	Record
14	December 5	Alaska Aces	83–99	Taulava (20)	Taulava (15)	Dimaunahan (6)	Araneta Coliseum	5–9
15	December 7	Talk 'N Text	82–90	Macapagal (31)	Taulava (22)	Taulava, Enrile (5)	Araneta Coliseum	5–10
16	December 12	San Miguel	105-91	Belasco (23)	Belasco (15)	Cabagnot (6)	Araneta Coliseum	6–10
17	December 14	Sta. Lucia	69–90	Telan (20)	Telan (15)	Arigo, Dimaunahan (4)	Araneta Coliseum	6–11
18	December 19	Red Bull	88-86	Arigo (31)	Telan (14)	Cabagnot (7)	Ynares Center	7–11

2008–09 schedule

=== Playoffs ===
2008–09 PBA Philippine Cup playoff game log
January

Game	Date	Opponent	Score	High points	High rebounds	High assists	Location Attendance	Record
1	December 28	San Miguel	89–99	Taulava (20)	Taulava (14)	Cabagnot (7)	Araneta Coliseum	0–1

2008–09 schedule

== Fiesta Cup ==
=== Standings ===
Pos	Team	W	L	PCT	GB	Qualification
1	San Miguel Beermen	11	3	.786	—	Advance to semifinals
2	Barangay Ginebra Kings	8	6	.571 (Note: Head-to-head differential: Rain or Shine +15, Barangay Ginebra −7, Burger King −8; second seed playoff: Barangay Ginebra 114–71 Rain or Shine)	3	Advance to semifinals
3	Rain or Shine Elasto Painters	8	6	.571	3	Twice-to-beat in the wildcard round
4	Burger King Whoppers	8	6	.571	3	Twice-to-beat in the wildcard round
5	Sta. Lucia Realtors	7	7	.500 (Note: Head-to-head differential: Sta. Lucia +7, Purefoods +3, Talk 'N Text −10)	4	Knockout in the wildcard round
6	Purefoods Tender Juicy Giants	7	7	.500	4	Knockout in the wildcard round
7	Talk 'N Text Tropang Texters	7	7	.500	4	Knockout in the wildcard round
8	Coca-Cola Tigers	6	8	.429 (Note: Eighth seed playoff: Coca-Cola 81–74 Alaska)	5	Knockout in the wildcard round
9	Alaska Aces	6	8	.429	5	Twice-to-win in the wildcard round
10	Barako Bull Energy Boosters	2	12	.143	9	Twice-to-win in the wildcard round

Source: PBA.ph

=== Game log ===
2009 PBA Fiesta Cup game log
March

Game	Date	Opponent	Score	High points	High rebounds	High assists	Location Attendance	Record
1	March 4	Ginebra	103–110	Sullinger (28)	Sullinger, Taulava (11)	Taulava (5)	Ynares Center	0–1
2	March 6	Barako	62–69	Sullinger, Buenafe (18)	Taulava (14)	Cabagnot (8)	Cuneta Astrodome	1–1
3	March 11	Talk 'N Text	111-133	Sullinger (32)	Taulava (17)	Cabagnot (7)	Cuneta Astrodome	1–2
4	March 15	San Miguel	96–106	Sullinger (23)	Taulava (8)	Buenafe (5)	Araneta Coliseum	1–3
5	March 20	Burger King	109–127	Sullinger (32)	Sullinger (16)	Cabagnot (6)	Araneta Coliseum	1–4
6	March 26	Purefoods	80-89	Penny (26)	Penny, Taulava (14)	Cabagnot (6)	Ynares Sports Arena	1–5

April

Game	Date	Opponent	Score	High points	High rebounds	High assists	Location Attendance	Record
7	April 12	Alaska Aces	89-85	Penny (36)	Penny (10)	Cabagnot, Taulava (3)	Araneta Coliseum	2–5
8	April 29	Purefoods	85-92	Penny, Belasco (17)	Penny (13)	Cabagnot (6)	Araneta Coliseum	2–6

May

Game	Date	Opponent	Score	High points	High rebounds	High assists	Location Attendance	Record
9	May 3	Barako	120–106	Penny (36)	Taulava (10)	Cabagnot (5)	Araneta Coliseum	3–6
10	May 6	Sta. Lucia	88–79	Taulava (24)	Taulava (20)	Cabagnot (6)	Araneta Coliseum	4–6
11	May 9	Talk 'N Text	100-103	Taulava (26)	Taulava (17)	Cabagnot, Taulava (4)	Bohol	4–7
12	May 15	Rain or Shine	94–91	Penny (30)	Penny (13)	Cabagnot (4)	Ynares Center	5–7
13	May 20	Ginebra	85-122	Buenafe (21)			Araneta Coliseum	5–8
12	May 22	San Miguel	105–89	Buenafe (30)	Taulava (14)	Penny (5)	Araneta Coliseum	6–8

2008–09 schedule

=== Playoffs ===
2009 PBA Fiesta Cup playoff game log
May

Game	Date	Opponent	Score	High points	High rebounds	High assists	Location Attendance	Record
1	May 24	Alaska	81–74	Penny (29)	Penny (18)	Cabagnot (7)	Ynares Center	1–0
1	May 31	Sta. Lucia	88–94	Penny (33)	Penny (17)	Cabagnot (4)	Araneta Coliseum	1–1

2008–09 schedule

== Statistics ==
Legend
GP	Games played	GS	Games started	MPG	Minutes per game
FGM	Field-goal made	FGA	Field-goal attempts	FG%	Field-goal percentage
3PM	3-point field-goal made	3PA	3-point field-goal attempts	3P%	3-point field-goal percentage
FTM	Free-throw made	FTA	Free-throw attempts	FT%	Free-throw percentage
RPG	Rebounds per game	APG	Assists per game	SPG	Steals per game
BPG	Blocks per game	TOT	Turnovers per game	PPG	Points per game

Player	GP	MPG	FG%	3FG%	FT%	RPG	APG	SPG	BPG	PPG
Leo Avenido	7	7.7	.353	.200	1.000	1.9	.6	.0	.0	2.7
Nic Belasco	32	32.1	.393	.265	.699	7.7	1.3	.3	.3	11.8
Lawrence Bonus	2	12	.286	.000	.000	3.5	.5	.5	.0	2.0
Ronjay Buenafe	32	23.4	.406	.357	.825	2.8	1.6	.8	.1	11.1
Alex Cabagnot	32	37.0	.356	.240	.667	3.6	5.3	1.4	.4	10.8
M.C. Caceres	2	4.5	.000	.000	.000	1.0	.0	.0	.0	.0
Ricky Calimag	27	11.4	.402	.400	.737	2.4	.5	.0	.0	4.1
Cesar Catli	14	15.3	.333	.315	.000	2.7	.5	.1	.1	4.2
Aries Dimaunahan	31	10.4	.372	.283	.500	1.3	1.4	.5	.1	1.7
Ronjay Enrile	9	9.1	.300	.250	.000	.9	1.1	.0	.0	2.3
Kalani Ferreria	1	5	.000	.000	.000	.0	.0	.0	.0	.0
Mark Macapagal	35	22.1	.396	.314	.746	2.7	1.1	.9	.2	8.4
Jason Misolas	21	9.3	.310	.333	.500	2.3	.3	.2	.1	1.1
James Penny	11	42.7	.493	.190	.647	13.1	2.8	1.5	2.1	26.1
R.J. Rizada	37	17.2	.504	.389	.512	2.7	1.2	.3	.1	5.5
Rodney Santos	12	7.8	.303	.167	1.000	.8	.4	.0	.0	2.4
Dale Singson	5	8.2	.385	.286	.500	1.4	1.0	.4	.0	2.4
James Sullinger	5	39.8	.558	.235	.500	10.2	1.8	.8	.2	26.6
Asi Taulava	32	36.7	.439	.308	.552	12.8	3.0	.4	.5	16.9
Mark Telan	35	28.3	.500	.214	.624	6.9	1.4	.3	.5	9.2

== Awards and records ==
=== Awards ===
- Asi Taulava - Mythical First Team, All-Defensive Team

=== Records ===
Note: Coca-Cola Tigers Records Only

Record	Stat	Holder	Date/s	Ref.
Most points in one game	31	Mark Macapagal vs. Talk 'N Text Tropang Texters	December 7, 2008	
Most points in one game	31	John Arigo vs. Red Bull Barako	December 19, 2008	
Most rebounds in one game	25	Asi Taulava vs. Air21 Express	November 15, 2008	
Most assists in one game	11	Alex Cabagnot	2 Occasions	
Most blocks in one game	2	Mark Telan vs. Barangay Ginebra Kings	November 27, 2008	
Most steals in one game	5	Alex Cabagnot vs. Rain or Shine Elasto Painters	October 26, 2008	
Most minutes played in one game	50	Asi Taulava vs. Purefoods TJ Giants	October 15, 2008	

== Transactions ==
=== Additions ===
Player	Signed	Former team
Lawrence Bonus	September	Undrafted
Rodney Santos	November	Barangay Ginebra Kings

=== Subtractions ===
Player	Left	New team
Froilan Baguion	November	San Miguel Beermen
