= 2008–09 San Miguel Beermen season =

- Head coach: Siot Tanquingcen
- General Manager: Hector Calma
- Owner(s): San Miguel Corporation

Philippine Cup results
- Record: 15–15 (50%)
- Place: 4th
- Playoff finish: Semifinals (lost to TNT 4–2)

Fiesta Conference results
- Record: 19–8 (70.4%)
- Place: 1st
- Playoff finish: Champions (Defeated Brgy.Ginebra 4–3)

San Miguel Beermen seasons

The 2008–09 San Miguel Beermen season was the 34th season of the franchise in the Philippine Basketball Association (PBA).

== Key dates ==
- August 30: The 2008 PBA Draft took place in Fort Bonifacio, Taguig.
- September 1: The free agency period started.

== Draft picks ==
Round	Pick	Player	Height	Position	Nationality	College
1	8	Bonbon Custodio	5 ft. 11 in.	Point guard	Philippines	East

== Roster ==
2008–09 San Miguel Beermen roster
Players

Pos.	#	POB	Name	Height	Weight	DOB (YYYY–MM–DD)	From
PG	1	(United States)	Mike Cortez	5 ft 11 in (1.80 m)	170 lb (77 kg)		De La Salle
PG	3	(Philippines)	Jonas Villanueva	6 ft 0 in (1.83 m)	178 lb (81 kg)		Far Eastern
C	4	(United States)	Dorian Peña	6 ft 7 in (2.01 m)	235 lb (107 kg)		Coppin State
G	5	(Philippines)	Bonbon Custodio	5 ft 11 in (1.80 m)	190 lb (86 kg)		UE
SG	7	(Philippines)	Dondon Hontiveros	6 ft 2 in (1.88 m)	175 lb (79 kg)		Cebu
PF	10	(Philippines)	Danny Ildefonso	6 ft 6 in (1.98 m)	210 lb (95 kg)		National-U
G/F	15	(Philippines)	Wesley Gonzales	6 ft 4 in (1.93 m)	180 lb (82 kg)		Ateneo
F	16	(Philippines)	Marc Pingris	6 ft 6 in (1.98 m)	200 lb (91 kg)		PSBA
PG	17	(Philippines)	Olsen Racela (C)	5 ft 10 in (1.78 m)	165 lb (75 kg)		Ateneo
G/F	18	(Philippines)	Lordy Tugade	6 ft 3 in (1.91 m)	185 lb (84 kg)		National-U
C	21	(Philippines)	Samigue Eman	6 ft 9 in (2.06 m)	239 lb (108 kg)		Mindanao
SF	23	(Philippines)	Jay Washington	6 ft 7 in (2.01 m)	220 lb (100 kg)		Eckerd
SF	25	(United States)	Gabriel Freeman	6 ft 6 in (1.98 m)	220 lb (100 kg)		Mesa CC
PG	27	(Philippines)	Froilan Baguion	5 ft 8 in (1.73 m)	150 lb (68 kg)		National-U
C	34	(Australia)	Mick Pennisi	6 ft 9 in (2.06 m)	235 lb (107 kg)		Eastern Michigan
PF	41	(Philippines)	Ken Bono	6 ft 5 in (1.96 m)	230 lb (104 kg)		Adamson
SF	42	(Philippines)	Danny Seigle (injured)	6 ft 7 in (2.01 m)	205 lb (93 kg)		Wagner
SG	88	(Philippines)	Chris Calaguio	6 ft 0 in (1.83 m)	185 lb (84 kg)		Letran

Coaches
Head coach
- (Philippines) Siot Tanquingcen (UST)
Assistant(s)
- (Philippines) Gee Abanilla (De La Salle)
- (Philippines) Pido Jarencio (UST)
- (Philippines) Freddie Abuda (Cebu)
- (Philippines) Biboy Ravanes (Cebu)

Legend
- (DP) Unsigned draft pick
- (FA) Free agent
- (S) Suspended
- Injured

== Depth chart ==
Pos.	Starting 5	Bench
C	Dorian Peña	Marc Pingris
PF	Jay Washington	Lordy Tugade
SF	Gabe Freeman	Danny Ildefonso
SG	Dondon Hontiveros	Jonas Villanueva
PG	Mike Cortez	Olsen Racela

== Philippine Cup ==
=== Eliminations ===
==== Standings ====
Pos	Team	W	L	PCT	GB	Qualification
1	Alaska Aces	12	6	.667	—	Advance to semifinals
2	Talk 'N Text Tropang Texters	11	7	.611	1	Advance to semifinals
3	Barangay Ginebra Kings	10	8	.556 (Note: Head-to-head differential: Barangay Ginebra +16, Rain or Shine −3, Sta. Lucia −13)	2	Advance to quarterfinals
4	Rain or Shine Elasto Painters	10	8	.556	2	Advance to quarterfinals
5	Sta. Lucia Realtors	10	8	.556	2	Advance to quarterfinals
6	San Miguel Beermen	9	9	.500	3	Advance to wildcard round
7	Purefoods Tender Juicy Giants	8	10	.444 (Note: Head-to-head record: Purefoods 2–0 Air21)	4	Advance to wildcard round
8	Air21 Express	8	10	.444	4	Advance to wildcard round
9	Coca-Cola Tigers	7	11	.389	5	Advance to wildcard round
10	Red Bull Barako	5	13	.278	7	

Source: PBA.ph

==== Game log ====
2009 PBA Philippine Cup game log
October

Game	Date	Opponent	Score	High points	High rebounds	High assists	Location Attendance	Record
1	October 5	Alaska	84–85	Custodio (14)			Cuneta Astrodome	0–1
2	October 10	Purefoods	111–98	Hontiveros (15)			Cuneta Astrodome	1–1
3	October 15	Rain or Shine	89–82	Hontiveros (17)			Araneta Coliseum	2–1
4	October 17	Talk 'N Text	84–77	Washington (21)			Araneta Coliseum	3–1
5	October 22	Brgy.Ginebra	118–89	Tugade (21)			Araneta Coliseum	4–1
6	October 25	Red Bull	113–114	Hontiveros (21)			Gingoog	4–2
7	October 30	Sta.Lucia	89–71	Tugade (19)			Ynares Sports Arena	5–2

November

Game	Date	Opponent	Score	High points	High rebounds	High assists	Location Attendance	Record
8	November 5	Air21	130–129 (2OT)	Hontiveros (25)	Washington (13)		Araneta Coliseum	6–2
9	November 12	Coca Cola	89–86	Pennisi (18)			Cuneta Astrodome	7–2
10	November 15	Alaska	85–91	Custodio (20)				7–3
11	November 19	Sta.Lucia					Araneta Coliseum	7–4
12	November 23	Purefoods	83–84	Tugade (18)			Cuneta Astrodome	7–5
13	November 26	Air21	98–78				Araneta Coliseum	8–5
14	November 30	Talk 'N Text	80–85	Tugade (20)			Singapore Indoor Stadium	8–6

December

Game	Date	Opponent	Score	High points	High rebounds	High assists	Location Attendance	Record
15	December 6	Red Bull	89–84	Washington (24)			Cuneta Astrodome	9–6
16	December 12	Coca Cola	91–105				Araneta Coliseum	9–7
17	December 17	Rain or Shine	92–93	Hontiveros (24)			Araneta Coliseum	9–8
18	December 20	Brgy.Ginebra	82–87				Batangas City	9–9

2008–09 schedule

== Fiesta Conference ==
=== Eliminations ===
==== Standings ====
Pos	Team	W	L	PCT	GB	Qualification
1	San Miguel Beermen	11	3	.786	—	Advance to semifinals
2	Barangay Ginebra Kings	8	6	.571 (Note: Head-to-head differential: Rain or Shine +15, Barangay Ginebra −7, Burger King −8; second seed playoff: Barangay Ginebra 114–71 Rain or Shine)	3	Advance to semifinals
3	Rain or Shine Elasto Painters	8	6	.571	3	Twice-to-beat in the wildcard round
4	Burger King Whoppers	8	6	.571	3	Twice-to-beat in the wildcard round
5	Sta. Lucia Realtors	7	7	.500 (Note: Head-to-head differential: Sta. Lucia +7, Purefoods +3, Talk 'N Text −10)	4	Knockout in the wildcard round
6	Purefoods Tender Juicy Giants	7	7	.500	4	Knockout in the wildcard round
7	Talk 'N Text Tropang Texters	7	7	.500	4	Knockout in the wildcard round
8	Coca-Cola Tigers	6	8	.429 (Note: Eighth seed playoff: Coca-Cola 81–74 Alaska)	5	Knockout in the wildcard round
9	Alaska Aces	6	8	.429	5	Twice-to-win in the wildcard round
10	Barako Bull Energy Boosters	2	12	.143	9	Twice-to-win in the wildcard round

Source: PBA.ph
