= 2008–09 Sta. Lucia Realtors season =

- Head coach: Boyet Fernandez
- Owner(s): Sta. Lucia Realty and Development Corporation

Philippine Cup results
- Record: 10–8 (55.6%)
- Place: 5th
- Playoff finish: Semifinals (lost to Alaska, 2-4)

Fiesta Conference results
- Record: 7–7 (50%)
- Place: 5th
- Playoff finish: Quarterfinals (lost to Burger King, 1–2)

Sta. Lucia Realtors seasons

The 2008–09 Sta. Lucia Realtors season was the 16th season of the franchise in the Philippine Basketball Association (PBA). The team wasn't able to defend their Philippine Cup trophy after losing to Alaska Aces in six games.

== Key dates ==
August 31: The 2008 PBA Draft took place at Market! Market! in Bonifacio Global City, Taguig.

== Draft picks ==
Round	Pick	Player	Height	Position	Nationality	College
1	10	Kelvin Gregorio	6'3"	Forward	Philippines	UE
2	14	Chito Jaime	6'4"	Power Forward	Philippines	AMA
2	19	Christian Cabatu			Philippines	Benilde

== Roster ==
2008–09 Sta. Lucia Realtors roster
Players

Pos.	#	POB	Name	Height	Weight	DOB (YYYY–MM–DD)	From
F	3	(Philippines)	Nelbert Omolon	6 ft 4 in (1.93 m)			Philippine Christian
F	7	(Philippines)	Kelvin Gregorio	6 ft 3 in (1.91 m)	190 lb (86 kg)		UE
G	8	(Philippines)	Paolo Mendoza	5 ft 11 in (1.80 m)			Philippines
G	10	(United States)	Ryan Reyes	6 ft 2 in (1.88 m)			Cal State Fullerton
C	13	(Philippines)	Marlou Aquino	6 ft 9 in (2.06 m)			Adamson
F/C	14	(Philippines)	Dennis Daa	6 ft 5 in (1.96 m)			Centro Escolar Las Piñas
F/C	16	(Philippines)	Dennis Espino (C)	6 ft 6 in (1.98 m)			UST
G	18	(Philippines)	Joseph Yeo	5 ft 11 in (1.80 m)			De La Salle
F	19	(Philippines)	Melvin Mamaclay	6 ft 5 in (1.96 m)			Adamson
F	21	(United States)	Kelly Williams	6 ft 7 in (2.01 m)			Oakland
G	25	(Philippines)	Ronnie Bughao	5 ft 11 in (1.80 m)			San Beda
F	28	(Philippines)	Norman Gonzales	6 ft 4 in (1.93 m)			San Beda
G	32	(Philippines)	Dennis Miranda	6 ft 0 in (1.83 m)			Far Eastern
G	41	(Philippines)	Christian Coronel	5 ft 11 in (1.80 m)			San Sebastian

Coaches
Head coach
- (Philippines) Boyet Fernandez
Assistant(s)
- (Philippines) Adonis Tierra
- (Philippines) Cholo Martin
- (Philippines) Jaime Serrano, Jr

Legend
- (DP) Unsigned draft pick
- (FA) Free agent
- (S) Suspended
- (I) Imports
- Injured

== Records ==
=== Philippine Cup ===
==== Team standings ====
Pos	Team	W	L	PCT	GB	Qualification
1	Alaska Aces	12	6	.667	—	Advance to semifinals
2	Talk 'N Text Tropang Texters	11	7	.611	1	Advance to semifinals
3	Barangay Ginebra Kings	10	8	.556 (Note: Head-to-head differential: Barangay Ginebra +16, Rain or Shine −3, Sta. Lucia −13)	2	Advance to quarterfinals
4	Rain or Shine Elasto Painters	10	8	.556	2	Advance to quarterfinals
5	Sta. Lucia Realtors	10	8	.556	2	Advance to quarterfinals
6	San Miguel Beermen	9	9	.500	3	Advance to wildcard round
7	Purefoods Tender Juicy Giants	8	10	.444 (Note: Head-to-head record: Purefoods 2–0 Air21)	4	Advance to wildcard round
8	Air21 Express	8	10	.444	4	Advance to wildcard round
9	Coca-Cola Tigers	7	11	.389	5	Advance to wildcard round
10	Red Bull Barako	5	13	.278	7	

Source: PBA.ph

==== Schedule ====
	Round 1									Round 2								
Team ╲ Game	1	2	3	4	5	6	7	8	9	10	11	12	13	14	15	16	17	18
Air21 Express	ROS	TNT	BGK	Coke	SLR	ALA	PF	SMB	ROS	Coke	RBB	SMB	PF	BGK	SLR	RBB	ALA	TNT
Alaska Aces	SMB	Coke	RBB	ROS	TNT	A21	BGK	SLR	PF	SMB	ROS	TNT	SLR	Coke	RBB	BGK	A21	PF
Barangay Ginebra Kings	SLR	A21	RBB	SMB	PF	ALA	ROS	Coke	TNT	PF	SLR	Coke	RBB	A21	ALA	TNT	SMB	ROS
Coca-Cola Tigers	TNT	ALA	PF	A21	SLR	ROS	RBB	BGK	SMB	A21	PF	ROS	BGK	ALA	TNT	SMB	SLR	RBB
Purefoods Tender Juicy Giants	RBB	SMB	Coke	SLR	ROS	BGK	A21	TNT	ALA	RBB	BGK	Coke	SMB	A21	ROS	SLR	TNT	ALA
Rain or Shine Elasto Painters	A21	RBB	SMB	ALA	PF	Coke	TNT	BGK	A21	SLR	ALA	Coke	RBB	SLR	PF	TNT	SMB	BGK
Red Bull Barako	PF	ROS	ALA	BGK	SMB	TNT	Coke	SLR	PF	TNT	A21	ROS	BGK	SMB	ALA	A21	Coke	SLR
Sta. Lucia Realtors	BGK	TNT	PF	Coke	A21	SMB	ALA	RBB	ROS	SMB	BGK	TNT	ALA	ROS	A21	PF	Coke	RBB
San Miguel Beermen	ALA	PF	ROS	TNT	BGK	RBB	SLR	A21	Coke	ALA	SLR	PF	A21	TNT	RBB	Coke	ROS	BGK
Talk 'N Text Phone Pals	Coke	A21	SLR	SMB	ALA	RBB	ROS	PF	BGK	RBB	ALA	SLR	SMB	Coke	ROS	PF	BGK	A21

= Win; = OT win; = Loss; = OT loss

==== Bracket ====
Wildcard phase (Single elimination)
7	Purefoods	82
8	Air21	94
6	San Miguel	99
9	Coca-Cola	89

Wildcard phase (Single elimination)
8	Air21	86
6	San Miguel	105

Quarterfinals (Best-of-3)
3	Ginebra	1
6	San Miguel	2
4	Rain or Shine	0
5	Sta. Lucia	2

Semifinals (Best-of-7)
2	Talk 'N Text	4
6	San Miguel	2
1	Alaska	4
5	Sta. Lucia	2

Finals (Best-of-7)
2	Talk 'N Text	4
1	Alaska	3
Third place
6	San Miguel	97
5	Sta. Lucia (OT)	99

==== Quarterfinals: (4) Rain or Shine vs (5) Sta. Lucia ====
C/S9

January 7

Sta. Lucia Realtors 101, Rain or Shine Elasto Painters 84

Araneta Coliseum, Quezon City

C/S9

January 9

Sta. Lucia Realtors 92, Rain or Shine Elasto Painters 85
Sta. Lucia wins series, 2–0

Cuneta Astrodome, Pasay

In their first playoff appearance since joining the league in 2006, the Elasto Painters were overwhelmed in Game 1 by the defending champions, who played with the comebacking Ryan Reyes who just came from injury. Fracas involving Rain or Shine's Gabe Norwood and Solomon Mercado at the end of the first game caused Norwood to be suspended in Game 2, and Mercado on Game 3 if it happens. The short-handed Elasto Painters wound up short in Game 2 as they were eliminated.

==== Semifinals: (1) Alaska vs (5) Sta. Lucia ====
C/S9

January 14

Sta. Lucia Realtors 76, Alaska Aces 92

Araneta Coliseum, Quezon City

C/S9

January 16

Sta. Lucia Realtors 87, Alaska Aces 94

Araneta Coliseum, Quezon City

C/S9

January 18

Sta. Lucia Realtors 76, Alaska Aces 65

Araneta Coliseum, Quezon City

C/S9

January 21

Sta. Lucia Realtors 83, Alaska Aces 88

Cuneta Astrodome, Pasay

C/S9

January 23

Sta. Lucia Realtors 81, Alaska Aces 74

Cuneta Astrodome, Pasay

C/S9

January 25

Sta. Lucia Realtors 83, Alaska Aces 87
Alaska wins series, 4–2

Cuneta Astrodome, Pasay

In a rematch of the 2007-08 semifinals series, the Aces won two consecutive game to lead the series 2–0. However, the Realtors won Game 3 to cut the series lead. But Alaska, seeking to prevent what happened last year, won Game 4 to take a commanding 3–1 series lead. Sta. Lucia won Game 5 but they came out short in Game 6 with Willie Miller having an all-around performance to lead the Aces to a rematch of the 2007 PBA Fiesta Conference Finals against Talk 'N Text.

=== Fiesta Conference ===
==== Standings ====
Pos	Team	W	L	PCT	GB	Qualification
1	San Miguel Beermen	11	3	.786	—	Advance to semifinals
2	Barangay Ginebra Kings	8	6	.571 (Note: Head-to-head differential: Rain or Shine +15, Barangay Ginebra −7, Burger King −8; second seed playoff: Barangay Ginebra 114–71 Rain or Shine)	3	Advance to semifinals
3	Rain or Shine Elasto Painters	8	6	.571	3	Twice-to-beat in the wildcard round
4	Burger King Whoppers	8	6	.571	3	Twice-to-beat in the wildcard round
5	Sta. Lucia Realtors	7	7	.500 (Note: Head-to-head differential: Sta. Lucia +7, Purefoods +3, Talk 'N Text −10)	4	Knockout in the wildcard round
6	Purefoods Tender Juicy Giants	7	7	.500	4	Knockout in the wildcard round
7	Talk 'N Text Tropang Texters	7	7	.500	4	Knockout in the wildcard round
8	Coca-Cola Tigers	6	8	.429 (Note: Eighth seed playoff: Coca-Cola 81–74 Alaska)	5	Knockout in the wildcard round
9	Alaska Aces	6	8	.429	5	Twice-to-win in the wildcard round
10	Barako Bull Energy Boosters	2	12	.143	9	Twice-to-win in the wildcard round

Source: PBA.ph

==== Results ====
- Results above and to the left of the gray boxes are first round games; those below and to the right are second round games.

Team	ALA	BBE	BGK	BKW	COKE	PF	ROS	SMB	SLR	TNT
Alaska Aces		90–92	82–81	88–106	85–89	94–84	94–96	89–93	90–100	122–124
Barako Bull Energy Boosters	90–100		103–111	110–123	103–106	92–96	83–93	92–99	91–100	135–132
Barangay Ginebra Kings	75–76			106–110	110–103	107–105	93–107	80–95	76–80	97–90
Burger King Whoppers		99–89	94–100		127–109	78–82	112–118	105–114	96–84	105–118
Coca-Cola Tigers		120–106	85–122			89–80	94–91*	91–106	88–79	111–133
Purefoods Tender Juicy Giants	74–80			86–96	92–85		102–94*	103–122	93–91	131–121
Rain or Shine Elasto Painters		103–97	89–94			110–90		95–102	100–109	96–102
San Miguel Beermen	91–84			105–107*	89–105		72–82		92–90	98–87
Sta. Lucia Realtors		98–88	98–101			104–95	90–82	92–98		106–100
Talk 'N Text Tropang Texters	115–122*			129–135**	103–00		116–118*		97–91	

Legend: Blue = left column team win; Red = top row team win.
Matches with lighter background shading were decided after overtime.

==== Bracket ====
Wildcard phase
(#4 twice-to-beat)
4	Burger King	96
9	Alaska	90
(Single-elimination)
5	Sta. Lucia	94
8	Coca-Cola	88
(#3 twice to beat)
3	Rain or Shine	96
10	Barako Bull	88
(Single-elimination)
6	Purefoods (2OT)	126
7	Talk 'N Text	123

Quarterfinals (Best-of-3)
4	Burger King	2
5	Sta. Lucia	1
3	Rain or Shine	2
6	Purefoods	1

Semifinals (Best-of-7)
1	San Miguel	4
4	Burger King	2
2	Ginebra	4
3	Rain or Shine	2

Finals (Best-of-7)
1	San Miguel	4
2	Ginebra	3
Third place playoff
4	Burger King	132
3	Rain or Shine	118

==== Wildcard phase ====
C/S9

May 29

Recap

Sta. Lucia Realtors 94, Coca-Cola Tigers 88

Araneta Coliseum, Quezon City

==== Quarterfinals: (4) Burger King vs. (5) Sta. Lucia ====
C/S9

May 31

Recap

Burger King Whoppers 84, Sta. Lucia Realtors 93

Araneta Coliseum, Quezon City

C/S9

June 3

Recap

Burger King Whoppers 94, Sta. Lucia Realtors 81

Araneta Coliseum, Quezon City

C/S9

June 14

Burger King Whoppers 120, Sta. Lucia Realtors 72
Burger King wins series 2–1

Araneta Coliseum, Quezon City

== Transactions ==
=== Subtractions ===
Player	Date	Reason
Philip Butel	2009 Fiesta	Waived

=== Imports recruited ===
Player	Debuted	Final
Anthony Johnson	February 28	June 14
