= 2005–06 Barangay Ginebra Kings season =

- Head coach: Siot Tanquingcen
- General Manager: Allan Caidic
- Owner(s): Ginebra San Miguel, Inc.

Fiesta Conference results
- Record: 13–12 (52%)
- Place: 4th
- Playoff finish: Semifinals

Philippine Cup results
- Record: 12–12 (50%)
- Place: 6th
- Playoff finish: Quarterfinals

Barangay Ginebra Kings seasons

The 2005–06 Barangay Ginebra Kings season was the 27th season of the franchise in the Philippine Basketball Association (PBA).

== Key dates ==
- August 14: The 2005 PBA Draft took place in Sta. Lucia East Grand Mall, Cainta, Rizal.

== Draft picks ==
Round	Pick	Player	Height	Position	Nationality	College
1	7	Michael Holper	6'7"	Forward - Center	United States	San Diego State

== Roster ==
2005–06 Barangay Ginebra Kings roster
Players

Pos.	#	POB	Name	Height	Weight	DOB (YYYY–MM–DD)	From
G	9	(Philippines)	Rodney Santos	6 ft 1 in (1.85 m)	175 lb (79 kg)	1973-05-30	San Sebastian
C	10	(Philippines)	Rommel Adducul	6 ft 6 in (1.98 m)	230 lb (104 kg)	1976-04-21	San Sebastian
G	11	(Philippines)	Kalani Ferreria	6 ft 3 in (1.91 m)		1979-02-04	Moorpark
G	12	(Philippines)	Edgar Echavez	5 ft 9 in (1.75 m)		1976-02-25	Misamis Institute
G	13	(Philippines)	Jayjay Helterbrand	6 ft 0 in (1.83 m)	170 lb (77 kg)	1976-10-14	Kentucky State
G/F	18	(Philippines)	Mark Macapagal	6 ft 2 in (1.88 m)	185 lb (84 kg)	1979-09-20	San Sebastian
F	24	(Philippines)	Allan Salangsang	6 ft 5 in (1.96 m)	200 lb (91 kg)	1976-10-15	Letran
F/C	30	(United States)	Eric Menk	6 ft 6 in (1.98 m)	221 lb (100 kg)	1974-08-24	Lake Superior State
C	33	(Philippines)	Manny Ramos	6 ft 7 in (2.01 m)		1981-11-10	De La Salle
F/C	36	(Philippines)	Ervin Sotto	6 ft 7 in (2.01 m)	210 lb (95 kg)	1981-07-10	Saint Francis of Assisi
F/C	45	(United States)	Michael Holper	6 ft 7 in (2.01 m)	210 lb (95 kg)	1981-05-21	San Diego State
G	47	(Philippines)	Mark Caguioa	6 ft 0 in (1.83 m)	189 lb (86 kg)	1979-11-19	Glendale CC (CA)
C	52	(United States)	Andy Seigle	6 ft 9 in (2.06 m)	235 lb (107 kg)	1972-05-15	New Orleans
F	80	(Philippines)	Sunday Salvacion	6 ft 3 in (1.91 m)	190 lb (86 kg)	1978-12-17	St. Benilde
G	88	(Philippines)	Aries Dimaunahan	6 ft 0 in (1.83 m)	185 lb (84 kg)	1978-03-21	UST
F	21	(United States)	Sean Lampley (I)	6 ft 7 in (2.01 m)	227 lb (103 kg)	1979-09-03	California
F/C	4	(United States)	Chris Porter (I)	6 ft 7 in (2.01 m)	218 lb (99 kg)	1978-05-09	Auburn

Coaches
Head coach
- (Philippines) Siot Tanquingcen
Assistant(s)
- (Philippines) Juno Sauler

Legend
- (DP) Unsigned draft pick
- (FA) Free agent
- (S) Suspended
- (I) Import
- Injured

== Fiesta Conference ==
=== Game log ===
2005–06 PBA Fiesta Conference game log
October

Game	Date	Opponent	Score	High points	High rebounds	High assists	Location Attendance	Record
1	October 5	Coca Cola	89–81	Lampley (29)			Araneta Coliseum	1–0
2	October 9	Sta.Lucia	88–92	Lampley (25)			Araneta Coliseum	1–1
3	October 14	Red Bull					Cuneta Astrodome	2–1
4	October 19	Alaska	72–102	Lampley (17)			Araneta Coliseum	2–2
5	October 22	Purefoods	78–84				Cagayan de Oro	2–3
6	October 26	Talk 'N Text	100–94				Araneta Coliseum	3–3
7	October 30	Sta.Lucia	96–89	Lampley (27)			Araneta Coliseum	4–3

November

Game	Date	Opponent	Score	High points	High rebounds	High assists	Location Attendance	Record
8	November 2	San Miguel	74–72	Menk (20)			Cuneta Astrodome	5–3
9	November 6	Air21	93–83	Menk (17)			Araneta Coliseum	6–3
10	November 11	Red Bull					Araneta Coliseum	6–4
11	November 16	Purefoods					Araneta Coliseum	7–4
12	November 19	Coca Cola	67–79				Lucena City	7–5

December

Game	Date	Opponent	Score	High points	High rebounds	High assists	Location Attendance	Record
13	December 10	Air21	101–109	Lampley (33)			Ormoc City	7–6
14	December 16	San Miguel	78–86				Cuneta Astrodome	7–7
15	December 21	Talk 'N Text	97–92	Porter (31)			Cuneta Astrodome	8–7
16	December 25	Alaska	96–89	Porter (29)			Cuneta Astrodome	9–7

2005–06 schedule

== Transactions ==
=== Pre-season ===
Players Added

Via Draft

- Michael Holper
- Mark Macapagal (Drafted by Talk 'N Text)

Via Free Agency

- Kalani Ferreria (From defunct Shell Turbo Chargers)
- Ervin Sotto (From defunct Shell Turbo Chargers)
Players Lost

Via Free Agency

- Bal David
- James Walkvist
- Miguel Noble

=== Additions ===
Player	Signed	Former team
Manny Ramos	March 2006	Coca Cola Tigers
Allan Salangsang	April 2006	Talk 'N Text
