= Bonbon Custodio =

Filipino basketball player

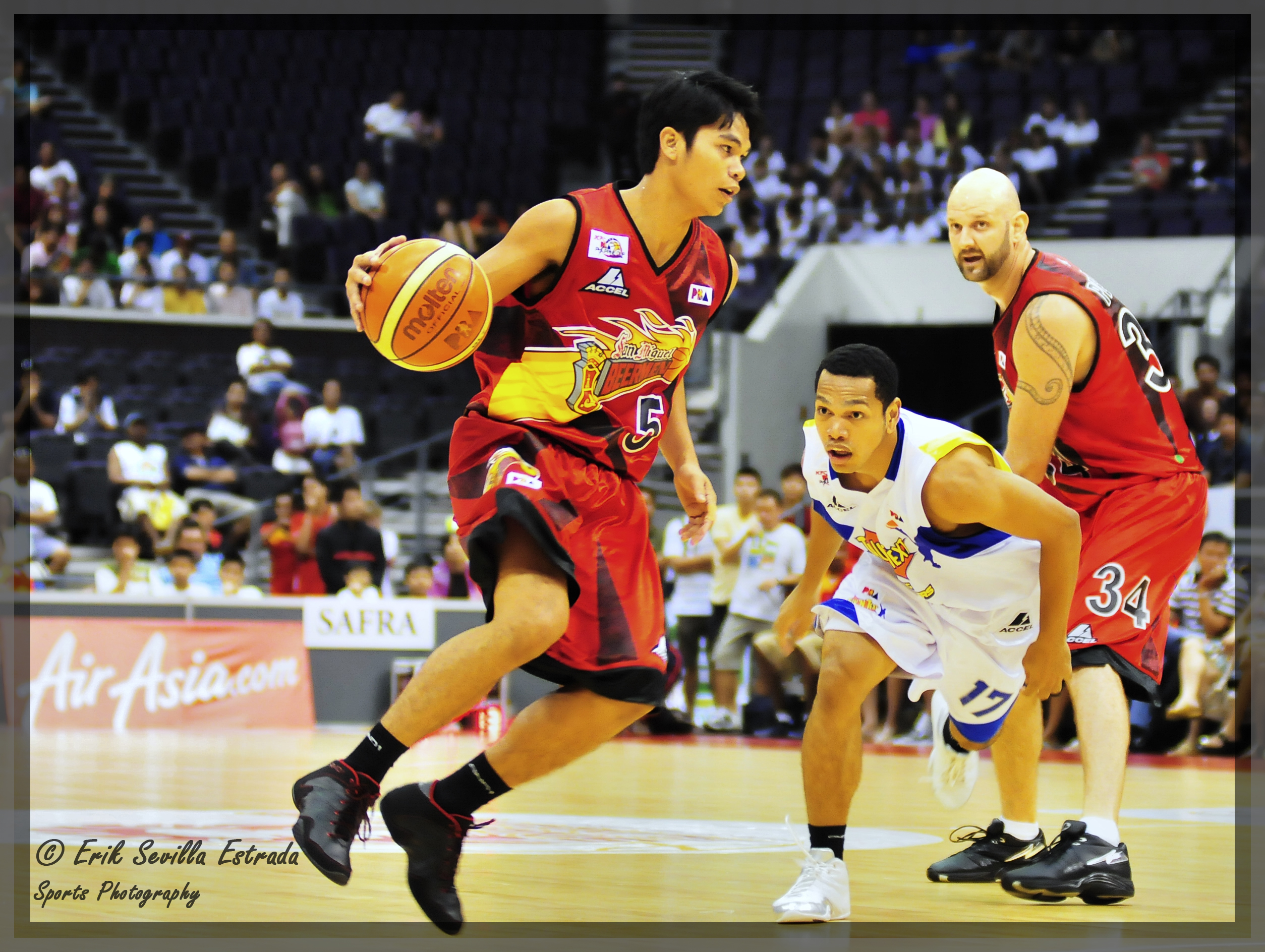
- Custodio guarded by Jayson Castro while with the San Miguel Beermen in 2008

Personal information
- Born: November 30, 1982 (age 43) Burauen, Leyte, Philippines
- Listed height: 5 ft 11 in (1.80 m)
- Listed weight: 165 lb (75 kg)

Career information
- College: UE
- PBA draft: 2008: 1st round, 8th overall pick
- Drafted by: San Miguel Beermen
- Playing career: 2008–present
- Position: Shooting guard

Career history
- 2008–2010: San Miguel Beermen
- 2010: Sta. Lucia Realtors
- 2010–2012: Alaska Aces
- 2012–2014: Air21 Express
- 2014: GlobalPort Batang Pier
- 2014: Barako Bull Energy
- 2018–2025: Davao Occidental Tigers

Career highlights
- PBA champion (2009 Fiesta); PBA All-Rookie Team (2009); MPBL champion (2021 Lakan); PSL champion (2022); PBL Mythical Second Team (2007-08 Season)

Bonifacio Custodio (born November 30, 1982) is a Filipino professional basketball player who last played for the Davao Occidental Tigers of the Maharlika Pilipinas Basketball League (MPBL). He was drafted 8th overall by the San Miguel Beermen during the 2008 PBA draft.

== PBA career statistics ==
Legend
GP	Games played	MPG	Minutes per game
FG%	Field-goal percentage	3P%	3-point field-goal percentage	FT%	Free-throw percentage
RPG	Rebounds per game	APG	Assists per game	SPG	Steals per game
BPG	Blocks per game	PPG	Points per game	**Bold**	Career high

=== Season-by-season averages ===
Year	Team	GP	MPG	FG%	3P%	FT%	RPG	APG	SPG	BPG	PPG
2008–09	San Miguel	**51**	**21.2**	.389	.246	.763	**3.3**	**2.3**	**1.4**	**.2**	**7.7**
2009–10	San Miguel	33	15.8	.409	.200	.657	1.6	1.8	.6	.1	4.2
2009–10	Sta. Lucia	33	15.8	.409	.200	.657	1.6	1.8	.6	.1	4.2
2010–11	Alaska	41	17.4	.409	.200	.656	2.9	1.3	.6	.1	4.9
2011–12	Alaska	34	20.0	.414	.000	.733	3.1	1.9	1.0	**.2**	5.6
2012–13	Air21	36	20.8	**.475**	.042	**.806**	2.9	**2.3**	1.0	.1	6.2
2013–14	Air21	26	17.7	.425	**.333**	.550	2.6	1.4	1.0	**.2**	4.2
2013–14	GlobalPort	26	17.7	.425	**.333**	.550	2.6	1.4	1.0	**.2**	4.2
2013–14	Barako Bull	26	17.7	.425	**.333**	.550	2.6	1.4	1.0	**.2**	4.2
Career		221	19.0	.416	.180	.717	2.8	1.9	.9	.1	5.7
