= Michael Holper =

Filipino-American basketball player

Personal information
- Born: May 21, 1981 (age 45) Norfolk, Virginia, U.S.
- Listed height: 6 ft 7 in (2.01 m)
- Listed weight: 210 lb (95 kg)

Career information
- College: San Diego State (1999–2003)
- PBA draft: 2005: 1st round, 7th overall pick
- Drafted by: Barangay Ginebra Kings
- Playing career: 2005–2010
- Position: Power forward / center
- Number: 45, 2, 1

Career history
- 2005–2008: Barangay Ginebra Kings
- 2008–2009: Barako Bull Energy Boosters
- 2009–2010: San Miguel Beermen

Career highlights
- PBA champion (2006–07 Philippine)

Michael Holper (born May 21, 1981) is a Filipino-American former professional basketball player. Born in Norfolk, Virginia, he last played for the San Miguel Beermen. He plays the power forward and center positions. Holper is known to be a defensive player.

== Career ==
Holper had the most number of starts among rookies in the 2005–06 season with 35 and this showed the kind of trust by then Barangay Ginebra Kings coach Siot Tanquingcen gave to him. Holper was a reliable player especially in defense and rebounding. But because of nagging injuries, he was sidelined for most of the 2005–06 season with the Kings.

Holper was later released by the Kings to clear salary cap. He was then signed by the Barako Bull Energy Boosters. In 2009, he was signed by the San Miguel Beermen. After his stint with the Beermen, he decided to retire from professional basketball.

== Personal life ==
Holper is married to his wife, whom he has three children.

He has a younger brother, named Melvin, who also plays power forward, who played college basketball in the Philippines for the Southwestern University of the Cebu Schools Athletic Foundation, Inc.

=== Season-by-season averages ===
Year	Team	GP	MPG	FG%	3P%	FT%	RPG	APG	SPG	BPG	PPG
2005–06	Barangay Ginebra	45	21.2	.316	.000	.671	5.7	1.1	.6	.3	4.1
2006–07	Barangay Ginebra	33	7.3	.429	.000	.833	1.9	.4	.2	.1	1.9
2007–08	Barangay Ginebra	9	18.3	.400	.000	.625	5.8	1.7	.7	.9	5.7
2008–09	Red Bull / Barako Bull	20	12.7	.368	.000	.526	3.8	.7	.5	.5	2.6
2009–10	San Miguel	14	8.4	.286	—	.500	2.4	.4	.4	.4	.7
Career		121	14.3	.347	.000	.667	4.0	.8	.5	.4	3.0
