= Rob Reyes =

Filipino-American basketball player

Personal information
- Born: March 16, 1983 (age 43) Bethesda, Maryland, U.S.
- Listed height: 6 ft 6 in (1.98 m)
- Listed weight: 215 lb (98 kg)

Career information
- High school: La Salle Green Hills (Mandaluyong); Oviedo (Oviedo, Florida)
- College: Flagler (2002–2006)
- PBA draft: 2008: 1st round, 4th overall pick
- Drafted by: Talk 'N Text Tropang Texters
- Playing career: 2008–2016
- Position: Center / power forward

Career history
- 2008–2009: Talk 'N Text Tropang Texters
- 2009–2010: Barako Bull Energy Boosters
- 2010–2011: Powerade Tigers
- 2011–2012: Petron Blaze Boosters
- 2012–2013: Air21 Express
- 2013–2015: Talk 'N Text Tropang Texters
- 2015–2016: NLEX Road Warriors

Career highlights
- 2× PBA champion (2008–09 Philippine, 2015 Commissioner's)

Robert Reyes (born March 16, 1983) is a Filipino-American former professional basketball player. He last played for the NLEX Road Warriors of the Philippine Basketball Association (PBA). He spent his college years in the United States at Flagler College. He was drafted fourth overall in the 2008 PBA draft by the Talk 'N Text Tropang Texters.

He announced his retirement on his Instagram account on December 15, 2016, after playing for eight years in the PBA. He decided to spend his post-retirement stage in the United States with his family.

== Early life and amateur career ==
Reyes was born in Bethesda, Maryland. He played for La Salle Green Hills in the Philippines for one year. He then moved back to the US and played at Oviedo High, where he was awarded Student-Athlete of the Year. In college, he played for Flagler College.

After Reyes graduated, he wanted to play in the PBA. However, the PBA had revised its rules, requiring Filipino-Americans to play in the PBL, a semi-professional league, at least one year. He played for the Harbour Centre Batang Pier, helping them win their first PBL championship. He also won Best Defensive Player and was a Mythical Team selection in his time there.

Reyes applied for the 2006 PBA draft, but the Bureau of Immigration failed to recognize his passport in time, so he backed out and returned to Harbour Centre. Two years later, he was successfully able to apply for the PBA draft.

== Professional career ==
=== Talk 'N Text Tropang Texters ===
Reyes was selected fourth overall in the 2008 PBA Draft by the Talk 'N Text Tropang Texters. He and Talk 'N Text's other draftees Jayson Castro and Jared Dillinger made their debut in a win over the Coca-Cola Tigers in the 2008–09 Philippine Cup. Talk 'N Text went on to win the championship that conference. Early in the second conference in his rookie season, he tore his ACL during practice.

=== Barako Bull Energy Boosters ===
In the offseason, Reyes was traded to the Barako Bull Energy Boosters. That would be most productive season, as he averaged 5.3 points and five rebounds in over 24 minutes of play.

=== Powerade Tigers ===
In 2010, Reyes and a second-round pick were sent to the Powerade Tigers in a 5-player, three-team trade. After the 2010–11 season ended, despite getting a one-year contract offer from Powerade, he decided to retire and move to Florida to be with his family.

=== Petron Blaze Boosters ===
Reyes was then offered a one-year deal by the Petron Blaze Boosters, who had just lost in the 2011 Governors' Cup finals. After the 2011–12, Petron extended his contract.

=== Air21 Express ===
On August 23, 2012, a trade was approved that sent him and Nonoy Baclao to the Air21 Express. Against his former team during the 2012–13 Philippine Cup, he scored 17 points on 8-of-9 shooting with six rebounds to help Air21 get the win. In their match against the Alaska Aces, he was seen hitting the Aces' Calvin Abueva in the face with an open hand. Reyes denied that he hit Abueva and was just trying to stand up, and claimed that Abueva pulled his jersey, causing both of them to fall down. Referees didn't see the play, so he wasn't given a technical foul. He was fined P10,000 for his actions and for taunting Abueva. In 2013, he announced that he had torn his ACL, this time on his opposite knee.

=== Return to the Tropang Texters ===
On October 14, 2013, Reyes and a 2015 second-round draft pick were sent to Talk 'N Text. This marked a return to the franchise that had drafted him. He was able to win one more championship with Talk 'N Text in the 2015 Commissioner's Cup.

=== NLEX Road Warriors ===
Months after the 2015 PBA Draft, Reyes and Kevin Alas were sent to the NLEX Road Warriors in a three-team trade.

A season later, NLEX traded Reyes to the Mahindra Floodbuster for Bradwyn Guinto. Mahindra however didn't give him a contract. On December 15, 2016, he announced his retirement on his Instagram account, deciding to return to the US to be with his family.

== PBA career statistics ==
Legend
GP	Games played	MPG	Minutes per game
FG%	Field-goal percentage	3P%	3-point field-goal percentage	FT%	Free-throw percentage
RPG	Rebounds per game	APG	Assists per game	SPG	Steals per game
BPG	Blocks per game	PPG	Points per game	**Bold**	Career high

=== Season-by-season averages ===
Year	Team	GP	MPG	FG%	3P%	FT%	RPG	APG	SPG	BPG	PPG
2008–09	Talk 'N Text	23	7.4	.359	.000	.444	1.7	.4	.2	.4	1.6
2009–10	Barako Bull	23	**24.7**	.421	.000	.559	**5.0**	**.8**	.4	**.8**	**5.3**
2010–11	Powerade	28	16.0	.426	.000	**.769**	4.4	**.8**	.4	.7	4.6
2011–12	Petron	**38**	14.6	.440	.000	.654	3.2	.3	.3	**.8**	3.8
2012–13	Air21	15	15.7	.426	.000	.607	4.4	**.8**	**.6**	.5	4.6
2013–14	Talk 'N Text	22	7.9	.276	.000	.333	1.6	.1	.1	.1	.9
2014–15	Talk 'N Text	23	12.2	.432	.000	.543	3.3	.3	.3	.1	3.9
2015–16	NLEX	27	8.5	**.500**	.000	.562	2.0	.1	.1	.3	1.8
Career		199	13.4	.422	.000	.598	3.2	.4	.3	.5	3.3

== Off the court ==
In 2012, while he was still playing for Petron and later on Air21, Reyes wrote a regular column for InterAKTV. In it he wrote about his experiences as a PBA player and being a Filipino-American.

== Post-retirement ==
After retiring, Reyes took up surfing. In 2020, he started a fundraiser "Share the Stroke", that gives surfboards to children in La Union.

Reyes also helps in recruiting Filipino-American players to play for the Philippines men's national basketball team, or to play in the Philippines. One player he recruited, James Laput, played for the DLSU Green Archers and was drafted in the first round of the Season 46 draft.

== Personal life ==
Rob Reyes is the nephew of former PBA player Eric Reyes. He has a twin brother, Edmund.
