= Tony Chua =

Antonio "Tony" Chua (1965-September 26, 2009) was a Filipino Chinese businessman. His family owns Photokina Marketing Corporation, which distributed Red Bull in the Philippines. He managed and was the governor of the Barako Bull Energy Boosters, the company's team in the Philippine Basketball Association (PBA) for which he previously served as chairman. Chua also served as vice president of Philippine Football Federation (PFF); he previously played high school varsity football for Colegio de San Juan de Letran.

== Early life ==
Chua studied in Colegio de San Juan de Letran up to college, graduating in 1975. He played for the Letran Squires football team where he was known as "Mr. Football".

== Career ==
Chua coached the Philippine women's national football team, and later served as vice president of the PFF.

Chua's company Photokina Marketing Corporation fielded Red Bull to the semiprofessional Philippine Basketball League (PBL), and he was tasked to manage the team. Then PBL commissioner Yeng Guiao allowed the team to compete.

When the Photokina franchise entered the professional Philippine Basketball Association (PBA) as Batang Red Bull, Chua appointed Guiao as the coach of the team. Guiao led the team to three championships: the 2001 and 2002 Commissioner's Cups, and the 2006 Fiesta Conference.

After Noli Eala resigned as PBA commissioner, Chua as chairman of the board of governors ran the league's daily affairs while a replacement was recruited.

After the 2008–09 Philippine Cup, Guiao resigned and the team was renamed the Barako Bull Energy Boosters. Guiao later signed as head coach of the Burger King Whoppers.

Among his projects in the PBA is the PBA Hall of Fame; he was one of the selectors for the third batch which were announced in 2009.

== Death ==
At the height of Tropical Storm Ketsana, Chua, his driver and his liaison officer left their car after it became stuck in traffic in Cainta, Rizal. The three trekked the flooded road when a strong current engulfed them, sucking away the driver. The two decided to stop and hold on to a tree. When a truck carrying lumber passed by, lumber that jutted out of the truck hit Chua in the face. What happened afterwards is unclear; he was believed to have suffered hypothermia or from internal hemorrhage, bleeding from the ears. His aide caught up with him and tried to revive him, but he died on the way to the hospital. The driver's body was recovered two days after the storm.

=== Reaction ===
Sports officials were saddened by Chua's demise. Guiao was "deeply shocked" and remarked that Chua was "well liked by everyone in the basketball community". Guiao's successor as commissioner in the PBL Chino Trinidad described Chua as "a funny guy" but "passionate in the game". PBA commissioner Barrios said that the PBA always "worked well" with him.
