= Adonis Santa Maria =

Filipino basketball player

Adonis Sta. Maria
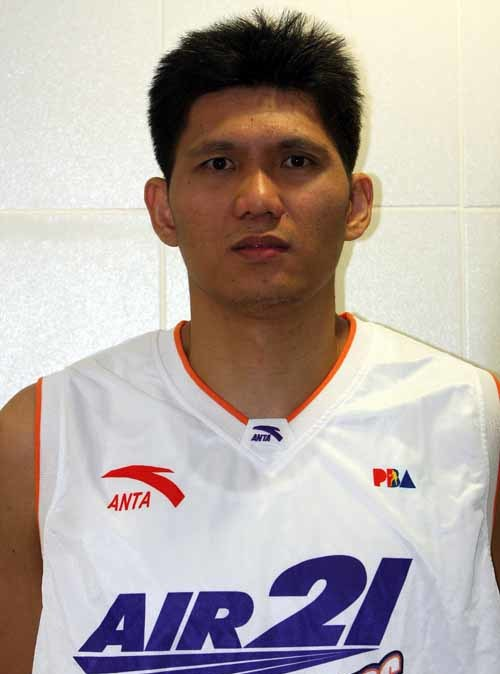
- Santa Maria in 2008

Personal information
- Born: January 20, 1979 (age 47) Isabela, Philippines
- Listed height: 6 ft 5 in (1.96 m)
- Listed weight: 205 lb (93 kg)

Career information
- High school: Mapúa (Manila)
- College: De La Salle
- PBA draft: 2003: 2nd round, 13th overall pick
- Drafted by: Shell Turbo Chargers
- Playing career: 2003–2010
- Position: Power forward / center

Career history
- 2003–2005: Shell Turbo Chargers
- 2005–2006: Sta. Lucia Realtors
- 2006–2008: Welcoat Dragons
- 2008–2009: Air21 Express
- 2009–2010: Barako Bull Energy Boosters

Career highlights
- 3× UAAP champion (1999, 2000, 2001)

Adonis Santa Maria (born January 20, 1979) is a Filipino former professional basketball player. He was drafted 13th overall by the Shell Turbo Chargers in 2003 PBA draft. He also played for the Sta. Lucia Realtors, Welcoat Dragons, the original Air21 Express, and the Barako Bull Energy Boosters during his Philippine Basketball Association stint.

== Player profile ==
Santa Maria played for La Salle in from 1999 to 2002.

In PBA, he played for coach Leo Austria in the Shell Turbo Chargers. He played 34 games in the 2007 season for the Welcoat Dragons and averaged 5.1 points per game and 4.9 rebounds per game. He was signed by the Air21 Express in 2008 but was later released by the team. In the middle of the 2009-10 PBA Philippine Cup, he was signed by the Barako Bull Energy Boosters.
