= 2008–09 Purefoods Tender Juicy Giants season =

- Head coach: Ryan Gregorio

Philippine Cup results
- Record: 8–10 (44.4%)
- Place: 8th
- Playoff finish: 1st wildcard round (by Air21 94–82)

Fiesta Conference results
- Record: 7–7 (50%)
- Place: 6th
- Playoff finish: Quarterfinals (by Rain or Shine 2–1)

Purefoods Tender Juicy Giants seasons

The 2008–09 Purefoods Tender Juicy Giants season was the 21st season of the franchise in the Philippine Basketball Association (PBA).

== Key dates ==
- August 30: The 2008 PBA Draft took place in Fort Bonifacio, Taguig.
- September 1: The free agency period started.

== Draft picks ==
Round	Pick	Player	Height	Position	Nationality	College
1	7	Beau Belga	6'7"	Power forward	Philippines	PCU
2	16	Jonathan Fernandez	6'3"	Shooting guard	Philippines	National

== Roster ==
2008–09 Purefoods Tender Juicy Giants roster
Players

Pos.	#	POB	Name	Height	Weight	DOB (YYYY–MM–DD)	From
PG	1	(Philippines)	Celino Cruz	5 ft 9 in (1.75 m)	170 lb (77 kg)		Far Eastern
PF	5	(Philippines)	Kerby Raymundo (C)	6 ft 6 in (1.98 m)	215 lb (98 kg)		Letran
SG	8	(Philippines)	Peter June Simon	6 ft 1 in (1.85 m)	180 lb (82 kg)		Mindanao
SF	9	(Philippines)	Niño Canaleta	6 ft 6 in (1.98 m)	210 lb (95 kg)		UE
C	10	(Philippines)	Rommel Adducul	6 ft 6 in (1.98 m)	220 lb (100 kg)		San Sebastian
PG	11	(Philippines)	Topex Robinson	5 ft 7 in (1.70 m)	155 lb (70 kg)		San Sebastian
SG	12	(Philippines)	Jonathan Fernandez	6 ft 3 in (1.91 m)	205 lb (93 kg)		National-U
PG	13	(Philippines)	Roger Yap	6 ft 0 in (1.83 m)	170 lb (77 kg)		USJ–R
C	14	(Philippines)	Enrico Villanueva	6 ft 6 in (1.98 m)	220 lb (100 kg)		Ateneo
PF	15	(Philippines)	Paolo Bugia	6 ft 6 in (1.98 m)	215 lb (98 kg)		Ateneo
SG	18	(Philippines)	James Yap	6 ft 3 in (1.91 m)	205 lb (93 kg)		UE
PG	19	(Philippines)	Al Vergara	5 ft 7 in (1.70 m)	155 lb (70 kg)		Saint Francis of Assisi
SF	28	(Philippines)	Richard Yee	6 ft 4 in (1.93 m)	210 lb (95 kg)		UST
SF	32	(Japan)	Rich Alvarez	6 ft 4 in (1.93 m)	210 lb (95 kg)		Ateneo
C	41	(Philippines)	Don Allado	6 ft 6 in (1.98 m)	220 lb (100 kg)		De La Salle
PF	51	(Philippines)	Jondan Salvador	6 ft 5 in (1.96 m)	215 lb (98 kg)		St. Benilde

Coaches
Head coach
- (Philippines) Ryan Gregorio (UP Diliman)
Assistant(s)
- (Philippines) Koy Banal (Mapúa)
- (Philippines) Rey Evangelista (UST)
- (Philippines) Jorge Gallent (Far Eastern)
- (Philippines) Ronnie Magsanoc (UP Diliman)
- (Philippines) Dayong Mendoza

Legend
- (DP) Unsigned draft pick
- (FA) Free agent
- (S) Suspended
- Injured

== Depth chart ==
Pos.	Starting 5	Bench 1	Bench 2	Bench 3	Reserve
C	Enrico Villanueva	Rommel Adducul	Paolo Bugia		Don Carlos Allado
PF	Marquin Chandler	Niño Canaleta	Jondan Salvador	Richard Yee
SF	Kerby Raymundo	Rich Alvarez
SG	James Yap	Peter June Simon
PG	Celino Cruz	Roger Yap	Al Vergara

== Philippine Cup ==
=== Elimination round ===
==== Standings ====
#	2008-09 PBA Philippine Cup					
#	Team	W	L	PCT	GB	Tie
1	y-Alaska Aces	12	6	.667	–	
2	y-Talk 'N Text Tropang Texters	11	7	.611	1	
3	x-Barangay Ginebra Kings	10	8	.556	2	+16
4	x-Rain or Shine Elasto Painters	10	8	.556	2	−3
5	x-Sta. Lucia Realtors	10	8	.556	2	−13
6	w-San Miguel Beermen	9	9	.500	3	
7	w-Purefoods TJ Giants	8	10	.444	4	+11
8	w-Air21 Express	8	10	.444	4	−11
9	w-Coca-Cola Tigers	7	11	.389	5	
10	e-Red Bull Barako	5	13	.278	7	

Legend:

- y-Qualified for semifinals
- x-Qualified for quarterfinals
- w-Qualified for the wildcard phase
- e-Eliminated

==== Game log ====
2009 PBA Philippine Cup game log
October

Game	Date	Opponent	Score	High points	High rebounds	High assists	Location Attendance	Record
1	October 8	Red Bull	77-73	Raymundo (23)	Raymundo (15)	Raymundo, Robinson, Salvador, Simon, R. Yap (1)	Araneta Coliseum	1–0
2	October 10	San Miguel	98–111	J. Yap (21)	Raymundo (8)	Raymundo (4)	Cuneta Astrodome	1–1
3	October 15	Coca-Cola	102–103	J. Yap (29)	Villanueva (13)	R. Yap (6)	Araneta Coliseum	1–2
4	October 18	Sta. Lucia	66–69	Raymundo (19)	Villanueva (12)	J. Yap, Aban (2)	Davao del Norte	1–3
5	October 23	Rain or Shine	84–88	Simon (23)	Villanueva (14)	Lanete (5)	Olivarez Gym	1–4
6	October 26	Ginebra	92-81	Simon (19)	Raymundo, Villanueva (11)	Raymundo (6)	Araneta Coliseum	2–4
7	October 31	Air21	108-105	Raymundo (37)	Villanueva (17)	Robinson (6)	Araneta Coliseum	3–4

November

Game	Date	Opponent	Score	High points	High rebounds	High assists	Location Attendance	Record
8	November 7	Talk 'N Text Tropang Texters	88-87	J. Yap (30)	Villanueva (12)	Robinson (7)	Cuneta Astrodome	4–4
9	November 9	Alaska	80–95	Belga, J. Yap (16)	Salvador (8)	Robinson (5)	Araneta Coliseum	4–5
10	November 14	Red Bull	80-72	J. Yap (28)	Villanueva (8)	Robinson (4)	Ynares Center	5–5
11	November 16	Ginebra	80–90	Yap (16)	Robinson (12)	J. Yap (4)	Cuneta Astrodome	5–6
12	November 21	Coca-Cola Tigers	72–93	J. Yap, Raymundo, Villanueva (15)	Alvarez (9)	Lanete (6)	Araneta Coliseum	5–7
13	November 23	San Miguel	84-83	Raymundo (25)	Villanueva (11)	Robinson, Lanete (5)	Cuneta Astrodome	6–7
14	November 29	Air21	96-88	Raymundo (27)	Villanueva (11)	R. Yap (5)	Tacloban City	7–7

December

Game	Date	Opponent	Score	High points	High rebounds	High assists	Location Attendance	Record
15	December 6	Rain or Shine	76–82	J. Yap (32)	Villanueva (14)	R. Yap (5)	Araneta Coliseum	7–8
16	December 11	Red Bull	71–73	J. Yap (20)	Villanueva (12)	Raymundo, R. Yap (5)	Ynares Sports Arena	7–9
17	December 14	Talk 'N Text	96-93	J. Yap (25)	Villanueva (10)	Robinson (5)	Araneta Coliseum	8–9
18	December 21	Alaska	74–76	Raymundo (23)	Villanueva (17)	R. Yap (4)	Cuneta Astrodome	8–10

2008–09 schedule

== Records ==
=== Records ===
Note: Purefoods TJ Giants Records Only

Record	Stat	Holder	Date/s
Most points in one game	42	James Yap vs. Coca-Cola Tigers	October 15, 2008
Most rebounds in one game	17	Enrico Villanueva vs. Air21 Express	October 31, 2008
Most assists in one game	7	Topex Robinson vs. Talk 'N Text Tropang Texters	November 7, 2008
Most blocks in one game	3	Kerby Raymundo vs. Red Bull Barako	October 8, 2008
Most steals in one game	5	Kerby Raymundo vs. Talk 'N Text Tropang Texters	November 7, 2008
Most minutes played in one game	50	James Yap vs. Coca-Cola Tigers	October 15, 2008

== Transactions ==
=== Trades ===
October 31, 2008	To Purefoods TJ Giants Rich Alvarez	To Red Bull Barako 2011 Draft pick
January 26, 2009	To Purefoods TJ Giants Don Carlos Allado	To Burger King Titans Beau Belga
January 26, 2009	To Purefoods TJ Giants Niño Canaleta	To Burger King Titans Chad Alonzo

=== Free agents ===
==== Additions ====
Player	Signed	Former team
Topex Robinson	September	Red Bull Barako
Aaron Aban	September	Alaska Aces

==== Subtractions ====
Player	Signed	New team
Noy Castillo	September	Retire
