= 2008 PBA draft =

Player selection in Philippine basketball

General information
- Date: August 31, 2008
- Time: 4:00 pm (PHT)
- Location: Market! Market! in Fort Bonifacio, Taguig
- Network: Solar TV

Overview
- League: Philippine Basketball Association
- First selection: Gabe Norwood, Rain or Shine Elasto Painters

The 2008 Philippine Basketball Association (PBA) rookie draft was an event at which teams drafted players from the amateur ranks. The event was held at Market! Market! in Taguig on August 31, 2008. The Rain or Shine Elasto Painters (formerly known as the Welcoat Dragons) selected Gabe Norwood of the George Mason University as the number one draft pick. Players applied for the draft had undergone a two-day rookie camp.

== Round 1 ==
PG	Point guard	SG	Shooting guard	SF	Small forward	PF	Power forward	C	Center	*	Mythical team member	^{#}	All-star

Pick	Player	Country of origin*	PBA team	College
1	Gabe Norwood*	United States	Rain or Shine Elasto Painters	George Mason
2	Jared Dillinger^{#}	United States	Talk 'N Text Phone Pals	Hawaii
3	Jayson Castro*	Philippines	Talk 'N Text Phone Pals (from San Miguel Beermen)	PCU
4	Rob Reyes	United States	Talk 'N Text Phone Pals	Flagler
5	Sol Mercado^{#}	United States	Alaska Aces	Biola
6	Mark Borboran	Philippines	Air21 Express	UE
7	Beau Belga^{#}	Philippines	Purefoods Tender Juicy Giants	PCU
8	Bonbon Custodio	Philippines	San Miguel Beermen	UE
9	Larry Rodriguez	Philippines	Red Bull Barako	PMI
10	Kelvin Gregorio	Philippines	Sta. Lucia Realtors	UE

== Round 2 ==
Pick	Player	Country of origin*	PBA team	College
1	Pong Escobal	Philippines	Talk 'N Text Phone Pals	San Beda
2	TY Tang	Philippines	Rain or Shine Elasto Painters	De La Salle
3	Pocholo Villanueva	Philippines	Air 21 Express	De La Salle
4	Chito Jaime	Philippines	Sta. Lucia Realtors	AMA
5	Kelvin dela Peña	Philippines	Alaska Aces	Mapúa
6	Jonathan Fernandez	Philippines	Purefoods Tender Juicy Giants	NU
7	Jeff Chan*	Philippines	Red Bull Barako	FEU
8	Mark Cuevas	United States	Red Bull Barako	Los Angeles County
9	Christian Cabatu	Philippines	Sta. Lucia Realtors	St. Benilde

== Undrafted players ==
Player	Country of origin*	College
Juan Luis Abad	Philippines	St. Benilde
Lawrence Bonus	Philippines	UM
Patrick Cabahug	Philippines	Adamson
Andrew Catigan	Canada	Langara
Jan Anthony Coching	Philippines	St. Benilde
Dennis Concha	Philippines	
Rene Cunanan	Philippines	JRU
Kevin Dulafu	United States	Vanguard
Nestor David	Philippines	UP Diliman
Michael Dizon	United States	Florida College
Anthony Espiritu	Philippines	UST
Julian Bermejo	Philippines	San Sebastian
Ismael Juinio	Philippines	Letran
Nizar Kiram	Philippines	St. Francis
Ferdie Melocoton	Philippines	EAC
Franklyn Nailon	Philippines	UC
Ricky Natividad	Philippines	PSBA
Leimar Navarro	Philippines	PCU
Angelus Raymundo	Philippines	San Beda Alabang / UE
Ryan Regalado	Philippines	UM
Unik Christian Reyes	Philippines	St. Benilde
Earn Saguindel	Philippines	UE
Eder Saldua	Philippines	FEU
Mark Yee	Philippines	San Sebastian-Cavite
Eian Yu	United States	UCLA

== Draft-day trades ==
- Jay Washington was traded to the San Miguel Beermen for the rights of Talk 'N Text's third overall pick.

== Off-season trades ==
- Joe Devance (Rain or Shine Elasto Painters) and 2 second-round picks was traded to Alaska Aces for Solomon Mercado & Eddie Laure

== Note ==
*All aspirants are Filipinos until proven otherwise.
