= 2000 UST Growling Tigers basketball team =

2000 UST Growling Tigers men's basketball

Record
- Elims rank: #T–4
- Final rank: #4
- 2000 record: 9–7 (8–6 elims)
- Head coach: Aric del Rosario (14th season)
- Assistant coaches: Boy Ong
- Captain: Marvin Ortiguerra (4th season)

The 2000 UST Growling Tigers men's basketball team represented University of Santo Tomas in the 63rd season of the University Athletic Association of the Philippines. The men's basketball tournament for the school year 2000–01 began on July 15, 2000, and the host school for the season was also UST.

The Tigers ended the double round-robin eliminations in joint fourth place with the UE Red Warriors, with eight wins and six losses. They won their playoff match for the fourth and final semifinal slot over the Warriors, 65–61. UST has qualified in each of the UAAP seasons' semifinal series since the Final Four format took effect in 1994.

Four of their games went into overtime, with three resulting to wins over the UP Fighting Maroons, the Adamson Falcons and the NU Bulldogs, and one ending on a loss to the FEU Tamaraws, all in the second round of eliminations.

They had an average winning margin of 6.4 points and an average losing margin of 6.5 points.

The Growling Tigers once again faced the De La Salle Green Archers in the Final Four on a twice-to-win disadvantage, and went unsuccessful with a 62–65 defeat.

== Roster ==
UST Growling Tigers roster
Players
Coaches

Pos.	No.	Nat.	Name	Height	Year	High School
SG	4	(Philippines)	Glenn John Manching	6'1" (1.85m)	2nd	University of the Visayas
PG	5	(Philippines)	Jake Westley Agleron	5'9" (1.75m)	3rd	San Sebastian College-Recoletos
PG	6	(Philippines)	Edsel Ronald del Rosario	5'9" (1.75m)	1st	University of Santo Tomas
PF	7	(Philippines)	Marvin Ortiguerra (C)	6'5" (1.96m)	4th	Mapúa Institute of Technology
SG	8	(Philippines)	Cyrus Baguio	6'2" (1.88m)	3rd	Southwestern University
C	9	(Philippines)	Gilbert Lao	6'7" (2.01m)	4th	Uno High School
SG	10	(Philippines)	Frederic Jamison Hubalde	6'1" (1.85m)	2nd	Mapúa Institute of Technology
C	12	(Philippines)	Alwyn Espiritu	6'5" (1.96m)	2nd	University of Santo Tomas
PF	13	(Philippines)	Christian Pierce Luanzon	6'4" (1.93m)	1st	Saint Stephen's High School
SF	14	(Philippines)	Niño Greggy Gelig	6'2" (1.88m)	3rd	Holy Angel University
PG	15	(Philippines)	Jino Manansala	5'8" (1.73m)	2nd	Burlington County, New Jersey
SF	16	(Philippines)	Arnulfo Roan Tuadles, Jr.	6'1" (1.85m)	2nd	Saint Francis of Assisi College
PF	17	(Philippines)	Melchor Latoreno	6'5" (1.96m)	5th	University of Santo Tomas
SF	18	(Philippines)	Emmerson Oreta	6'3" (1.91m)	4th	University of Santo Tomas
C	19	(Philippines)	Kenneth Co Yu Kang	6'5" (1.96m)	1st	Jubilee Christian Academy
PG	20	(Philippines)	Donn Rez Villamin	6'3" (1.91m)	1st	Rizal High School

Head coach

- (Philippines) Januario del Rosario

Assistant coach(es)

Eusebio Ong

Team manager

- Benito Lim
- Timmy Koh Teng Chong

Legend

- (C) Team captain
- Injured

- Roster

=== Depth chart ===
Pos.	Starting 5	Bench 1	Bench 2
C	Lao	Espiritu	Co Yu Kang
PF	Ortiguerra	Latoreno
SF	Gelig	Oreta	Tuadles
SG	Baguio	Hubalde	Manching
PG	Agleron	Villamin	Manansala

== Roster changes ==
The Tigers lost team captain Gelo Velasco to graduation, as well as their defense specialist in forward Jeff Valeriano. Among UST's new players are the rookie forward Christian Luanzon, who is coming off back-to-back championships with Saint Stephen's High School in the Metro Manila Tiong Lian Basketball Association, and returning guard Apol Tuadles.

=== Subtractions ===
Pos.	No.	Nat.	Player	Height	Year	High school	Notes
PG	6	(Philippines)	Angelo Velasco	5' 9"	5th	St. Francis High School	Graduated
PF	11	(Philippines)	Jose Valeriano	6' 3"	2nd		Academic deficiencies
SG	16	(Philippines)	Kelwin Jansen Ang	5' 10"	2nd	University of Santo Tomas	Transferred to Colegio de San Juan de Letran
PG	19	(Philippines)	Erwin de Leon	5' 11"	2nd		Relegated to Team B
PF	20	(Philippines)	Iago Jaime Raterta	6' 3"	2nd		Relegated to Team B

=== Additions ===
Pos.	No.	Nat.	Player	Height	Year	High school	Notes
PG	6	(Philippines)	Edsel Ronald del Rosario	5' 9"	1st	University of Santo Tomas	Rookie
PF	13	(Philippines)	Christian Pierce Luanzon	6' 4"	1st	Saint Stephen's High School	Rookie
SF	16	(Philippines)	Arnulfo Roan Tuadles, Jr.	6' 1"	2nd	Saint Francis of Assisi College	Returning from Season 61
C	19	(Philippines)	Kenneth Co Yu Kang	6' 5"	1st	Jubilee Christian Academy	Rookie
PG	20	(Philippines)	Donn Rez Villamin	6' 3"	1st	Rizal High School	Rookie

== Schedule and results ==
=== Preseason tournaments ===
The Growling Tigers joined the inaugural season of the six-team National Basketball League in May. Games were played in a double round-robin home and away format, and were televised on ABS-CBN.

UST failed to make it to the semifinals of the Father Martin Cup Invitational tournament, even as they tied the UE Red Warriors, the PCU Dolphins and the San Sebastian Stags with 7–1 records due to an inferior quotient.

Preseason game log

6th Fr. Martin Cup Invitational basketball tournament: 7–1
Game	Date • Time	Opponent	Result	Record	High points	High rebounds	High assists	Location
1	May 5	PCU Dolphins	L 71–83	0–1				FEU Gym; Manila
2	May 7	San Beda Red Lions	W 80–65	1–1				Blue Eagle Gym Quezon City
8	May 31	FEU Tamaraws	W 70–69	7–1				FEU Gym; Manila

2000 National Basketball League: 3–7
Game	Date • Time	Opponent	Result	Record	High points	High rebounds	High assists	Location
1	May 19 • 3:15 pm	San Sebastian Stags	W 75–70	1–0	Latoreno (19)			UST Gym; Manila
2	May 22 • 10:00 am	Lyceum Pirates	L 62–70	1–1				Lyceum Gym; Manila
3	May 24 • 10:00 am	Benilde Blazers	L 58–59	1–2				UST Gym; Manila
4	May 26 • 10:00 am	PSBA Jaguars	L 62–70	1–3	Lao (16)			San Andres Gymnasium Manila
5	May 29 • 10:00 am	MLQU Stallions	W 74–69	2–3	Oreta (15)			UST Gym; Manila
6	Jun 1 • 9:00 am	San Sebastian Stags	L 71–77	2–4				San Sebastian Gym Manila
7	Jun 2 • 1:45 pm	MLQU Stallions	L 51–67	2–5				San Sebastian Gym Manila
8	Jun 5 • 10:00 am	Benilde Blazers	L 52–69	2–6	Lao (21)			St. Benilde Gym Mandaluyong
9	Jun 7 • 10:00 am	PSBA Jaguars	W 79–71	3–6	Oreta (23)			UST Gym; Manila
10	Jun 9 • 3:30 pm	Lyceum Pirates	L 76–82	3–7				UST Gym; Manila

(#) Tournament seedings in parentheses.
All times are in UTC+08:00.

=== UAAP games ===
Elimination games were played in a double round-robin format and all of UST's games were televised on Studio 23.

UAAP Season 63 game log

Elimination round: 8–6
Game	Date • Time	Opponent	Result	Record	High points	High rebounds	High assists	Location
1	Jul 15 • 5:00 pm	FEU Tamaraws	L 54–65	0–1	Baguio (11)			Araneta Coliseum Quezon City
2	Jul 20 • 4:00 pm	Adamson Soaring Falcons	W 67–53	1–1	Oreta (20)			Ninoy Aquino Stadium Manila
3	Jul 22 • 1:00 pm	Ateneo Blue Eagles	W 80–64	2–1	Espiritu (13)			Ninoy Aquino Stadium Manila
4	Jul 27 • 2:00 pm	NU Bulldogs	W 70–63	3–1	Tied (15)			Ninoy Aquino Stadium Manila
5	Jul 30 • 2:45 pm	UP Fighting Maroons	W 49–45	4–1	Ortiguerra (14)			Ninoy Aquino Stadium Manila
6	Aug 5 • 3:00 pm	UE Red Warriors	L 53–64	4–2				Blue Eagle Gym Quezon City
7	Aug 10 • 4:00 pm	De La Salle Green Archers; End of R1 of eliminations	L 55–59	4–3				Ninoy Aquino Stadium Manila
8	Aug 19 • 2:00 pm	UP Fighting Maroons	W 75–72^{OT}	5–3	Baguio (19)			Rizal Memorial Coliseum Manila
9	Aug 24 • 4:00 pm	De La Salle Green Archers	L 59–67	5–4	Baguio (10)			Blue Eagle Gym Quezon City
10	Aug 27 • 1:00 pm	Adamson Soaring Falcons	W 54–53^{OT}	6–4	Baguio (13)			Rizal Memorial Coliseum Manila
11	Sep 2 • 1:00 pm	UE Red Warriors	W 57–56	7–4	Baguio (24)			Blue Eagle Gym Quezon City
12	Sep 7 • 4:00 pm	FEU Tamaraws	L 57–61^{OT}	7–5				Ninoy Aquino Stadium Manila
13	Sep 10 • 3:00 pm	Ateneo Blue Eagles	L 59–60	7–6	Oreta (17)			Rizal Memorial Coliseum Manila
14	Sep 14 • 2:00 pm	NU Bulldogs; End of R2 of eliminations	W 75–70^{OT}	8–6	Oreta (20)			Ninoy Aquino Stadium Manila

Playoff for fourth seed: 1–0
Game	Date • Time	Opponent	Result	Record	High points	High rebounds	High assists	Location
1	Sep 21 • 4:00 pm	UE Red Warriors	W 65–61	1–0 (9–6)	Tied (12)			Ninoy Aquino; Stadium Manila

Final Four: 0–1
Game	Date • Time	Seed	Opponent	Result	Series	High points	High rebounds	High assists	Location
1	Sep 24 • 2:45 pm	(#4)	(#1) De La Salle Green Archers	L 62–65	0–1 (9–7)	Baguio (13)			Araneta Coliseum Quezon City

(#) Tournament seedings in parentheses.
All times are in UTC+08:00.
Source: Google News Archives

=== Summary ===
Even without the already-graduated Gelo Velasco, the Growling Tigers remained formidable for Season 63 due to their near-intact lineup that featured the strong front line of Marvin Ortiguerra, Gilbert Lao, Mel Latoreno, and Alwyn Espiritu. They also had their shifty wing men in Cyrus Baguio, Niño Gelig, Emmerson Oreta, and Derick Hubalde, who all had gained added experience while playing in the Philippine Basketball League in the off-season.

"I hope they will recover in time for the UAAP. If not, I have no choice but to rely on Marvin (Ortiguerra), Niño Gelig and Cyrus Baguio."

—Aric del Rosario

Their runner-up finish from the past year has made them contenders, and the players' overconfidence and complacency has gotten head coach Aric del Rosario concerned. Another issue was the various injuries that his starters incurred in the buildup to the opening of the season. Latoreno was expected to be out for six weeks due to a stretched cartilage, while Lao had surgery on his lower back and needed time for recuperation. Hubalde also fractured a finger on his left hand, and Oreta had been suffering from a sprained ankle.

==== First round ====
	1	2	Total
FEU	37	28	65
UST	29	25	54

FEU Tamaraws

The Growling Tigers' error-filled plays allowed FEU to erect an 11-point 53–42 lead early in the second half. Latoreno was called for an unsportsmanlike foul on FEU's Rysal Castro, as his elbow hit and bloodied Castro's mouth. UST was trailing by two at 27–29 with 3:43 left in the first half, but the Tamaraws went on an 8–2 run to close the half with an eight-point lead.

Adamson Soaring Falcons

The Tigers defeated Adamson, 67–53 as their three-point shooting found their range during the game. They began the game with 13 unanswered points and ended the half on a 30–23 lead.

	1	2	Total
UST	30	37	67
Adamson	23	30	53

Oreta fired five of the Tigers' 10 three-pointers to lead the team with 20 points. Hubalde chipped in 9 points, with all of his points coming from beyond the arc. UST led by as high as 21 points in the second half at 53–32, but the Falcons went on a 12–5 rally to come within 14 at 58–44.

Ateneo Blue Eagles

Rookie guard Dondon Villamin came off the bench to orchestrate the Growling Tigers' plays to a come-from-behind win over the Ateneo Blue Eagles. The first half ended with UST trailing, 27–39, and after the halftime huddle, with head coach Aric del Rosario lashing out at his players, the boys erupted with an 18–8 run to begin the second half.

"I gave them a severe tongue-lashing. I told them that whoever will not follow the plays will be taken out."

—Aric del Rosario

	1	2	Total
Ateneo	39	25	64
UST	27	53	80

Emmerson Oreta converted his and-1 to give UST the lead at 51–50 as they limited Ateneo to only five field goals in the second half, with the Eagles going scoreless for seven minutes. Four of the Tigers scored in double figures with Alwyn Espiritu finishing with 13 points. Oreta and Cyrus Baguio contributed 12 points apiece, while Niño Gelig added 11.

	1	2	Total
UST	33	37	70
NU	33	30	63

NU Bulldogs

UST relied on their big men, Alwyn Espiritu and Mel Latoreno to take advantage of the NU Bulldogs' shorter defenders as they attacked the shaded lane for a 70–63 win. Latoreno and Derick Hubalde topscored for the Tigers with 15 points apiece.

UP Fighting Maroons

The Tigers made 8 out of their 10 free throws at endgame to defeat the UP Fighting Maroons, 49–45. UST had trailed for almost the entire game, until they tightened up on defense to gain the upperhand. Already up by 2 points at 47–45 in the final 12 seconds, they forced a turnover on the Maroons' Rob Bornancin, as he was made to pass to teammate Edrick Ferrer. The Tigers scored the last basket for the win. Marvin Ortiguerra and Alwyn Espiritu topscored with 14 and 10 points respectively.

	1	2	Total
UP	26	19	45
UST	22	27	49

==== Second round ====
"Our aim now is to reach the no. 2 spot. I just hope the boys play consistent basketball. We can still do that (making the Final Four), as long as they will follow my instructions."

—Aric del Rosario

UST's first round of eliminations ended with four wins against three losses. With the exception of the Ateneo Blue Eagles, who won the Father Martin Cup in the preseason, all their other wins were against teams with losing records. The Tigers have shown inconsistency in their losses due to the absence of a playmaker after former team captain Gelo Velasco's departure from the team. The one advantage that the Tigers have with their inconsistency is in their offense, as no player in their roster made it to the top ten in scoring averages. This trend has left their opponents guessing in terms of defense, as to who they will need to guard more or switch with a double team on.

	1	2	OT	Total
UST	29	35	11	75
UP	34	30	8	72

UP Fighting Maroons

Cyrus Baguio missed both his free throws with time running out in regulation, sending the game into overtime with UP at 64–all. In the extra period, Baguio added nine to his total 19 points, pulling UST to a five-point 69–64 lead. The Maroons came to within two points, but they sent Baguio to the line anew after a foul from Bornancin was called. He split his charity for a 75–72 score, with 5.7 seconds remaining. UP's Mike Bravo went for a running three-point shot, but missed, giving the Tigers their fifth win in eight games. Derick Hubalde and Mel Latoreno chipped in 15 and 11 points as they joined Baguio in scoring double-digits for UST.

"I always ask them to shoot from the free throw line. They all do that in practice, which is why I don't understand as to why they couldn't shoot when it comes to actual games. I think the problem is psychological."

—Aric del Rosario

Adamson Soaring Falcons

The Tigers blew hot and cold throughout the game and were only saved by Adamson's missed free throws in the dying seconds of the overtime period. Oreta's 1 of 2 from the charity stripe gave the Tigers a three-point cushion with seven seconds remaining in regulation, but Baguio fouled the Falcons' Joshua Ramirez, who was going for a three-point shot.

UST was trailing, 37–42 in the last three minutes of regulation time, until Baguio sparked a four-point run that included a difficult twisting undergoal basket to tie the score at 42–all in the last 23 seconds. Marvin Ortiguerra towed his team to a 54–51 overtime lead with his back-to-back mid-range jumpers.

Dondon Villamin and Derick Hubalde were unable to finish the game when they suffered separate injuries. Villamin dislocated his shoulder, while Hubalde twisted his ankle during one of the plays.

	1	2	Total
UE	28	28	56
UST	31	26	57

UE Red Warriors

UE placed the game under protest with the Warriors' coach Itoy Esguerra claiming a three-point shot by Baguio should have been nullified because the halftime buzzer has sounded before the ball was released.

The Warriors' rookie James Yap fired a three-pointer to pull his team within one at 56–57 in the last 24 seconds. A miss by Oreta in the next play gave the Warriors the last possession and a chance to steal the game, but Yap missed a 14-foot jumper and his teammate Ronald Tubid, who had gotten the rebound was called for stepping out of bounds.

Cyrus Baguio led the team with 24 points, 9 rebounds and 2 assists. He scored 20 points in the first half.

FEU Tamaraws

UST was held scoreless by the FEU Tamaraws in the last seven minutes and were forced into overtime, where they scored only two points, eventually losing, 57–61. Glenn Manching converted a three-point basket to pull the Tigers to a seven-point 55–48 lead late in the second half before his team went on a scoring drought. FEU's Edwin Bacani had the chance to send the Tamaraws to victory at the end of regulation, but he missed his jumper, ten feet away from the goal. The Tigers got the rebound, with Niño Gelig attempting and missing his shot as time expired.

The Tigers were tentative in their offense throughout the game, as evindenced in their zero fast break points and only five free throw attempts.

	1	2	Total
UST	34	25	59
Ateneo	36	24	60

Ateneo Blue Eagles

The Growling Tigers' 59–60 loss to Ateneo pushed them down to a 7–6 record and put them in danger of missing the Final Four, as the UE Red Warriors, sporting a 7–5 record were looking to overtake them by winning their last two games of the eliminations.

Cyrus Baguio was fouled and sent to the free throw line in the closing seconds of the game. He converted his first foul shot to give the Tigers the lead at 59–58, but he missed the second charity which was rebounded by the Eagles' Enrico Villanueva, who then made a pass to teammate Wesley Gonzales for a fast break. Gonzales, in turn passed the ball to Magnum Membrere for the game-winning shot.

	1	2	OT	Total
NU	38	31	1	70
UST	31	38	6	75

NU Bulldogs

The Tigers were trailing, 66–69 with six seconds left, when Emmerson Oreta drilled his sixth three-point shot to send the game into overtime. They limited the Bulldogs to a single point in the extra period, as they forced four errors on them. Niño Gelig earlier scored a triple to push UST up by three at 72–69. The game went down to a battle of free throws until time expired, with the Tigers winning, 75–70.

Oreta topscored for the Tigers with 20 points, with Marvin Ortiguerra and Cyrus Baguio adding 15 and 12 respectively.

==== Playoffs ====
	1	2	Total
UST	33	32	65
UE	23	38	61

UE Red Warriors

Cyrus Baguio, Marvin Ortiguerra, and Jake Agleron conspired to quash UE's persistence at making repeated comebacks the entire game, to topscore in their 65–61 win with 12, 12, and 10 points respectively.

UST made a crucial turn when Ortiguerra blocked the Warriors' Ronald Tubid, with the ball landing on Baguio's hands. Tubid fouled Baguio and sent him to the line and was able to convert both shots. Agleron added two more free throws to give the Tigers a 64–58 lead. UE's Aldwyn Manubag fired a triple to cut down UST's lead to three with time running down. The Warriors fouled Baguio to stop the clock, and the Growling Tiger made one of two for the final count of 65–61.

	1	2	Total
La Salle	39	26	65
UST	32	30	62

De La Salle Green Archers

The Growling Tigers fell victim to a 0–11 uprising by the Green Archers, midway in the first half to drop behind, 12–25. They ended the first period trailing by seven points at 32–39. They played catch-up the rest of the way as the team could not get the usual big plays from Ortiguerra, Baguio, and Alwyn Espiritu.

Niño Gelig and Jake Agleron sparked an 8–1 run that brought the score to within three at 62–65 with 1:03 left in the game after being down, 54–64. Derick Hubalde then stole off La Salle's Mon Jose and streaked down for a fast break, but failed to pass off to an open Cyrus Baguio, and instead took a three-point shot and missed. The Archers were able to collar the rebound with 26 seconds remaining. La Salle's Renren Ritualo missed his shot, giving UST a chance to equalize, but Hubalde, who earlier converted three triples missed his potential game-tying attempt as the game clock expired.

== Players drafted into the PBA ==
Marvin Ortiguerra was picked eighth in the first round of the 2001 PBA draft by the Norman Black-led Sta. Lucia Realtors team on January 14, 2001. Gilbert Lao, meanwhile applied for the draft the following year and was selected in the second round by the Chot Reyes-coached Coca-Cola Tigers as the 11th overall pick in the 2002 PBA draft on January 13, 2002.

Year	Round	Pick	Overall	Player	PBA team
2001	1	8	8	Marvin Ortiguerra	Sta. Lucia Realtors
2002	2	1	11	Gilbert Lao	Coca-Cola Tigers
