= Yancy de Ocampo =

Filipino basketball player

Personal information
- Born: November 11, 1980 (age 46) Tanza, Cavite, Philippines
- Listed height: 6 ft 9 in (2.06 m)
- Listed weight: 235 lb (107 kg)

Career information
- College: St. Francis
- PBA draft: 2002: 1st round1st overall
- Drafted by: FedEx Express
- Playing career: 2002–2019
- Position: Center
- Number: 18, 95

Career history
- 2002–2004: Fedex Express
- 2004–2005: Talk 'N Text Phone Pals
- 2005–2006: Air21 Express
- 2006–2010: Talk 'N Text Phone Pals / Tropang Texters
- 2010–2011: Barangay Ginebra Kings
- 2011–2014: B-Meg Llamados/San Mig Coffee Mixers/San Mig Super Coffee Mixers
- 2014–2015: GlobalPort Batang Pier
- 2015–2019: San Miguel Beermen

Career highlights
- 12× PBA champion (2008–09 Philippine, 2012 Commissioner's, 2013 Governors', 2013–14 Philippine, 2014 Commissioner's, 2015 Governors', 2015–16 Philippine, 2016–17 Philippine, 2017 Commissioner's, 2017–18 Philippine, 2019 Philippine, 2019 Commissioner's); PBA Mythical Second Team (2007); PBL's 20 Greatest Players; PBL Most Valuable Player (2001–02 Alaxan-Challenge)

Yancy Rozal de Ocampo (born November 11, 1980) is a Filipino former professional basketball player. He is the elder brother of basketball player Ranidel de Ocampo. He is a 12-time Philippine Basketball Association (PBA) champion.

== College career ==
Yancy started playing organized basketball with the Saint Francis of Assisi College System Doves together with his brother, Ranidel. The De Ocampo brothers led the varsity squad to several NCRAA titles. Along with Ervin Sotto, they became known as the "Triple Towers".

== PBL career ==
Before entering the PBA, De Ocampo played in the Philippine Basketball League for the Welcoat Paints. He is also among the PBL's 20 Greatest Players of All-time.

== PBA career ==
=== Fedex Express ===
De Ocampo was the first overall pick during the 2002 PBA draft and was the first-ever draft pick of FedEx as a PBA team. He was signed to a P10.8 million contract that lasted three years.

=== Talk 'N Text Phone Pals ===
Fedex dealt him to the Talk 'N Text Phone Pals in a series of moves that made Talk 'N Text one of the teams to beat that season. In both conferences, they made it to the Finals, where they lost.

=== Air 21 Express ===
A month after the 2005 draft, just before the start of the 2005–06 season, De Ocampo was traded back to the Express for the first pick in that year's draft, Jay Washington.

=== Return to Talk 'N Text ===
In the 06–07 season, De Ocampo was reacquired by Talk 'N Text in a trade. He scored a season-high of 26 points. He would also go on to be named to the Mythical Second Team that season.

In the following seasons, he was able to win titles alongside his brother. He also had a career-high 33 points in a loss to Air21 during the 07–08 season.

=== Barangay Ginebra Kings ===
In the offseason of the 2010 Fiesta Conference, he was sent back to Air21. Five days later, Air21 traded him to Ginebra in exchange for Rich Alvarez and Doug Kramer.

=== B-Meg Llamados/San Mig Coffee franchise ===
De Ocampo was then traded from Ginebra to the B-Meg Llamados along with a 2nd-round draft pick for Rico Maierhofer.

In the opening week of the 2012–13 season, he scored 22 points in a win over the Alaska Aces. That was the most he had scored since his career-high. He won three straight championships in the 2013 Governors' Cup, 2014 Philippine Cup and the 2014 Commissioner's Cup. But he was traded midway through the 2014 Governors’ Cup which the Mixers also topped to complete their Grand Slam run.

=== GlobalPort Batang Pier ===
On June 4, 2014, De Ocampo and Val Acuña were traded to GlobalPort Batang Pier for Yousef Taha and Ronnie Matias.

=== San Miguel Beermen ===
De Ocampo was shipped to the San Miguel Beermen along with Gabby Espinas for Billy Mamaril and Doug Kramer. In an overtime win against the NLEX Road Warriors, he stepped up with a team-high-tying 17 points and 12 rebounds (Alex Cabagnot also had 17 points that game). In Game 1 of the 2015–16 Philippine Cup Finals, he had 18 points in a game he started with Junemar Fajardo injured. In Game 2, he had 13 points and 14 rebounds. The Beermen would go on to eventually win the championship.

In 2020, De Ocampo retired after 17 seasons in the PBA.

== PBA career statistics ==
Legend
GP	Games played	MPG	Minutes per game
FG%	Field-goal percentage	3P%	3-point field-goal percentage	FT%	Free-throw percentage
RPG	Rebounds per game	APG	Assists per game	SPG	Steals per game
BPG	Blocks per game	PPG	Points per game	**Bold**	Career high

=== Season-by-season averages ===
Year	Team	GP	MPG	FG%	3P%	FT%	RPG	APG	SPG	BPG	PPG
2002	FedEx	33	21.7	.409	.302	.731	5.6	.4	.3	.6	7.0
2003	FedEx	42	**24.9**	.439	.357	.515	7.0	.7	**.4**	.8	8.3
2004–05	Talk 'N Text	**75**	20.2	.416	.196	.603	5.6	.3	.2	.6	6.8
2005–06	Air21	52	23.2	.447	.341	.651	**7.7**	1.0	.3	.4	8.1
2006–07	Talk 'N Text	63	23.6	**.509**	.346	.669	7.1	1.5	**.4**	.7	**9.4**
2007–08	Talk 'N Text	38	16.7	.412	.298	.653	5.0	1.0	**.4**	.5	6.8
2008–09	Talk 'N Text	41	14.4	.426	.370	.640	4.6	.3	.2	.4	5.6
2009–10	Talk 'N Text	43	12.5	.382	.276	.833	3.5	.5	.1	.3	4.7
2009–10	Barangay Ginebra	43	12.5	.382	.276	.833	3.5	.5	.1	.3	4.7
2010–11	Barangay Ginebra	25	12.4	.331	.262	.636	3.4	.7	.1	.4	5.2
2011–12	Barangay Ginebra	57	15.6	.442	.143	.754	4.4	1.0	.1	.3	5.2
2011–12	B-Meg	57	15.6	.442	.143	.754	4.4	1.0	.1	.3	5.2
2012–13	San Mig Coffee	54	15.4	.426	.154	.780	4.1	1.4	.2	.5	4.6
2013–14	San Mig Super Coffee	34	10.5	.320	.167	.600	2.8	.6	.1	.3	2.2
2014–15	GlobalPort	13	19.4	.325	.286	**.846**	4.7	**1.6**	.2	.5	4.9
2015–16	San Miguel	44	11.1	.388	.286	.769	3.2	.7	.1	.3	3.2
2016–17	San Miguel	29	7.1	.379	.292	.357	1.8	.4	.0	.1	1.9
2017–18	San Miguel	19	7.5	.321	**.412**	.750	1.8	.3	.0	.1	2.4
2019	San Miguel	2	7.5	.167	.000	—	3.0	1.0	.0	**1.0**	1.0
Career		664	16.9	.422	.302	.665	4.8	.8	.2	.5	5.8

== Player profile ==
At 6'9", he was a capable outside shooter and a low post threat. He was also capable of limiting opposing centers' impact on the floor. As he got older, he became a reliable backup bigman.
