= 2015–16 PBA Philippine Cup finals =

Basketball cup finals

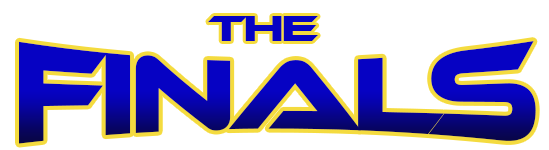
Team	Coach	Wins
(2) San Miguel Beermen	Leo Austria	4
(1) Alaska Aces	Alex Compton	3
- Dates: January 17 – February 3, 2016
- MVP: Chris Ross (San Miguel Beermen)
- Television: Local: Sports5; TV5; AksyonTV; Cignal PPV (HD); Hyper (HD); Fox Sports; International: AksyonTV International

Referees
- Game 1: A. Herrera, P. Balao, E. Tangkion, J. Oliva
- Game 2: P. Balao, J. Mariano, E. Tangkion, J. Oliva
- Game 3: N. Quilinguen, P. Balao, E. Tangkion, S. Pineda
- Game 4: N. Quilinguen, R. Marabe, R. Dacanay, J. Oliva
- Game 5: J. Mariano, N. Guevarra, J. Marabe, E. Tangkion
- Game 6: A. Herrera, P. Balao, N. Guevara, S. Pineda
- Game 7: N. Quilinguen, N. Guevarra, R. Dacanay, J. Oliva

PBA Philippine Cup finals chronology
- < 2014–15 2016–17 >

PBA finals chronology
- < 2015 Governors' 2016 Commissioner's >

The 2015–16 Philippine Basketball Association (PBA) Philippine Cup finals was the best-of-7 championship series of the 2015–16 PBA Philippine Cup, and the conclusion of the conference's playoffs. The Alaska Aces and the San Miguel Beermen competed for the 38th All-Filipino championship and the 116th overall championship contested by the league.

This also serves as the rematch for both teams, as they competed for the 2014–15 Philippine Cup and for the 2015 Governors' Cup, a year and a conference, respectively.

The Alaska Aces won the first three games to go up 3–0, behind Vic Manuel's outstanding performances. Since then, the San Miguel Beermen won Games 4, 5, and 6 to force a Game 7 and became the first team in PBA history to force a seventh game, after being down 0–3, behind excellent performances from Marcio Lassiter and Arwind Santos. Game 5 marked the return of June Mar Fajardo, who suffered a knee injury in Game 6 of their semifinals series against the Rain or Shine Elasto Painters.

San Miguel won against Alaska in seven games to capture their 22nd PBA championship and their 6th Philippine Cup. Dubbed as "BEERacle", San Miguel became the first team in professional basketball history to win a series coming from a 0–3 deficit.

== Background ==
In the 2015–16 PBA Philippine Cup, the Alaska Aces and the San Miguel Beermen were the top 2 teams in the conference, both with a 9–2 record. In their head-to-head matchup in the elimination round, the Aces defeated San Miguel, 103–97 to clinch the top spot in the elimination round. The Beermen finished second. With the virtue of being the top two teams, the Aces and the Beermen qualified directly to the semi-finals of the conference.

In the semifinals, Alaska faced the GlobalPort Batang Pier, who are making their first semifinals appearance in the history of their franchise. The first game was won by GlobalPort, led by Terrence Romeo's career high 41 points. Since then, the Aces bounced back to win 4 straight games to win the series 4–1 with the held, and make their 10th Philippine Cup finals appearance.

San Miguel faced the Rain or Shine Elasto Painters in the other semi-final series. The two teams last played a semifinals series against each other during the 2015 PBA Governors' Cup. The first game was won by San Miguel, coming back from a 20-point deficit, behind June Mar Fajardo's double-double of 36 points and 18 rebounds and Ronald Tubid's outside shooting heroics. Rain or Shine won Game 2, led by Jeff Chan's 16 points, and Game 3, led by Paul Lee's 18 points. The Elasto Painters were not able to win the next games and the Beermen went on to win 3 straight games to win the series 4–2 and to book their ticket to the finals. However, June Mar Fajardo got injured with a twisted left knee during the game and was brought out of the Smart Araneta Coliseum, and was brought directly to the St. Lukes Medical Center in Taguig.

=== Road to the finals ===
San Miguel		Alaska
Finished 9–2 (0.818): Tied with Alaska at 1st place	Elimination round	Finished 9–2 (0.818): Tied with San Miguel at 1st place
0.942 (2nd place)	Tiebreaker*	1.062 (1st place)
Automatically advanced after placing top 2	Quarterfinals	Automatically advanced after placing top 2
def. Rain or Shine, 4–2	Semifinals	def. GlobalPort, 4–1

=== head-to-head matchup ===
December 16

recap

San Miguel Beermen 97, Alaska Aces 103

Smart Araneta Coliseum, Quezon City

== Series summary ==
Team	Game 1	Game 2	Game 3	Game 4	Game 5	Game 6	Game 7	Wins
San Miguel	91	80	75	110*	86*	100	96	4
Alaska	100	83	82	104	73	89	89	3
Venue	Araneta	Araneta	Lucena	PhilSports	Araneta	Araneta	MOA

*overtime

=== Game 1 ===
TV5

January 17
5:00pm

Boxscore

San Miguel Beermen 91, Alaska Aces 100
Scoring by quarter: 23–23, 19–15, 33–28, 16–34
Pts: Cabagnot 20; Rebs: Espinas 8 Asts: Cabagnot, Ross 4	Pts: Manuel 24; Rebs: Abueva 13; Asts: Hontiveros, Jazul 4
Alaska leads series, 1–0

Smart Araneta Coliseum, Quezon City
Referees: A. Herrera, P. Balao, E. Tangkion, J. Oliva

In this game, the Beermen and the Aces were tied after the first quarter as both team scored 23 points a piece. Then at halftime, the Beermen hold a 4-point lead against the Aces. After the third quarter, the Beermen scored 33 points as they got a nine-point lead over the Aces. But in the 4th quarter, the Aces scored 34 points to comeback from a nine-point deficit in the 3rd quarter and won Game 1 of the series.

=== Game 2 ===
TV5

January 19
7:00pm

Boxscore

San Miguel Beermen 80, Alaska Aces 83
Scoring by quarter: 18–23, 18–16, 24–23, 20–21
Pts: Cabagnot 23; Rebs: de Ocampo 14; Asts: Lassiter 3	Pts: Manuel 18; Rebs: Abueva 11; Asts: Manuel 3
Alaska lead series, 2–0

Smart Araneta Coliseum, Quezon City
Referees: P. Balao, J. Mariano, E. Tangkion, J. Oliva

=== Game 3 ===
TV5

January 22
7:00pm

Boxscore

San Miguel Beermen 75, Alaska Aces 82
Scoring by quarter: 17–20, 24–11, 17–24, 17–27
Pts: Reyes 13; Rebs: Santos 9 Asts: Cabagnot 5	Pts: Manuel 17; Rebs: Baguio 8 Asts: Baguio 4
Alaska lead series, 3–0

Quezon Convention Center, Lucena
Referees: N. Quilinguen, P. Balao, E. Tangkion, S. Pineda

=== Game 4 ===
TV5

January 24
5:00pm

Boxscore

San Miguel Beermen 110, Alaska Aces 104 (OT)
Scoring by quarter: 20–28, 23–21, 26–28, 29–21, Overtime: 12–6
Pts: Lassiter 26; Rebs: Espinas 14; Asts: Ross 9	Pts: Manuel 20; Rebs: Manuel 13; Asts: Baguio, Casio 4
Alaska lead series, 3–1

PhilSports Arena, Pasig
Referees: N. Quilinguen, R. Marabe, R. Dacanay, J. Oliva

=== Game 5 ===
TV5

January 27
7:00pm

Boxscore

San Miguel Beermen 86, Alaska Aces 73 (OT)
Scoring by quarter: 23–20, 13–16, 16–19, 15–12, Overtime: 19–6
Pts: Santos 22; Rebs: Santos 16; Asts: Ross 7	Pts: Manuel 25; Rebs: Manuel 13; Asts: Abueva 6
Alaska lead series, 3–2

Smart Araneta Coliseum, Quezon City
Referees: J. Mariano, N. Guevarra, J. Marabe, E. Tangkion

=== Game 6 ===
TV5

January 29
7:00pm

Boxscore

San Miguel Beermen 100, Alaska Aces 89
Scoring by quarter: 22–29, 29–20, 16–17, 33–23
Pts: Lassiter 26; Rebs: Santos 15; Asts: three players 3	Pts: Manuel 21; Rebs: Abueva, Manuel 9 Asts: Jazul 4
Series tied, 3–3

Smart Araneta Coliseum, Quezon City
Attendance: 12,626
Referees: A. Herrera, P. Balao, N. Guevara, S. Pineda

=== Game 7 ===
TV5

February 3
7:00pm

Boxscore

San Miguel Beermen 96, Alaska Aces 89
Scoring by quarter: 22–16, 21–22, 25–13, 28–38
Pts: Fajardo, Ross 21; Rebs: Fajardo 15; Asts: Cabagnot, Ross 5	Pts: Banchero 21; Rebs: Baguio 11; Asts: Abueva, Exciminiano 3
San Miguel wins series, 4–3

Mall of Asia Arena, Pasay
Attendance: 23,616
Referees: N. Quilinguen, N. Guevarra, R. Dacanay, J. Oliva

In a controversial move, Alaska head coach Alex Compton called for three straight timeouts at the start of the game.

By winning the game and the series, San Miguel became the first team in professional basketball history to comeback in a 3–0 deficit. This comeback is known as the "Beeracle". It was cited by The New York Times in a May 2023 article about a prelude to the Game 7 of the 2023 NBA Eastern Conference finals series between the Boston Celtics and the Miami Heat, where Miami led the series 3–0 before Boston won the next three games to force a game 7. Unlike the Beermen, however, the Celtics lost the Game 7, rendering their comeback attempt as unsuccessful.

== Rosters ==
San Miguel Beermen roster
Players
Coaches

Pos.	#	POB	Name	Height	Weight	DOB (YYYY–MM–DD)	From
G	1	(Philippines)	Brian Heruela	5 ft 10 in (1.78 m)	195 lb (88 kg)	1989-04-13	Cebu
G/F	3	(United States)	Chris Lutz	6 ft 3 in (1.91 m)	200 lb (91 kg)	1985-02-11	Marshall
F/C	4	(Philippines)	Jay-R Reyes	6 ft 7 in (2.01 m)	215 lb (98 kg)	1984-07-16	UP Diliman
G	5	(Philippines)	Alex Cabagnot	6 ft 0 in (1.83 m)	180 lb (82 kg)	1982-12-08	Hawaiʻi–Hilo
G	6	(United States)	Chris Ross	6 ft 2 in (1.88 m)	180 lb (82 kg)	1985-03-08	Marshall
G/F	13	(United States)	Marcio Lassiter	6 ft 3 in (1.91 m)	185 lb (84 kg)	1987-05-16	Cal State Fullerton
C	15	(Philippines)	June Mar Fajardo	6 ft 10 in (2.08 m)	268 lb (122 kg)	1989-11-17	Cebu
G	18	(Philippines)	Ryan Araña	6 ft 1 in (1.85 m)	180 lb (82 kg)	1983-03-23	De La Salle
F	21	(Philippines)	Nelbert Omolon	6 ft 4 in (1.93 m)	185 lb (84 kg)	1980-06-30	Philippine Christian
F	27	(Philippines)	Gabby Espinas	6 ft 4 in (1.93 m)	200 lb (91 kg)	1982-01-03	Philippine Christian
F	28	(Philippines)	Michael Mabulac (R/IN)	6 ft 4 in (1.93 m)	218 lb (99 kg)	1991-10-31	José Rizal
F	29	(Philippines)	Arwind Santos (C)	6 ft 4 in (1.93 m)	175 lb (79 kg)	1981-06-10	Far Eastern
F	33	(Australia)	David Semerad	6 ft 5 in (1.96 m)	220 lb (100 kg)	1991-04-25	San Beda
G	71	(Philippines)	Ronald Tubid	6 ft 1 in (1.85 m)	185 lb (84 kg)	1981-10-15	UE
C	95	(Philippines)	Yancy De Ocampo	6 ft 9 in (2.06 m)	225 lb (102 kg)	1980-03-11	Saint Francis of Assisi

Head coach

- (Philippines) Leo Austria (Lyceum)

Assistant coach(es)

- (Philippines) Peter Martin (San Sebastian)
- (Philippines) Dayong Mendoza
- (Philippines) Biboy Ravanes (Cebu)
- (Philippines) Boyzie Zamar (UE)
- (Philippines) Ato Agustin (Lyceum)
- (Philippines) Jorge Gallent (Far Eastern)

Team manager

- (Philippines) Gee Abanilla (De La Salle)
- (Philippines) Daniel Henares (Assistant)

Legend

- (C) Team captain
- (CI) Commissioner's Cup Import
- (GI) Governors' Cup Import
- (EI) EASL Import
- (DP) Unsigned draft pick
- (FA) Free agent
- (IN) Inactive
- (S) Suspended
- (R) Rookie
- Injured

Roster

Alaska Aces roster
Players
Coaches

Pos.	#	POB	Name	Height	Weight	DOB (YYYY–MM–DD)	From
G	2	(United States)	Chris Banchero	6 ft 1 in (1.85 m)	185 lb (84 kg)	1989–01–24	Seattle Pacific
G/F	3	(Philippines)	Cyrus Baguio	6 ft 2 in (1.88 m)	180 lb (82 kg)	1980–08–19	UST
F	4	(Philippines)	Vic Manuel	6 ft 4 in (1.93 m)	208 lb (94 kg)	1987–06–18	PSBA
C	7	(Papua New Guinea)	Sonny Thoss	6 ft 7 in (2.01 m)	205 lb (93 kg)	1981–12–07	James Cook
F	8	(Philippines)	Calvin Abueva	6 ft 2 in (1.88 m)	185 lb (84 kg)	1988–02–04	San Sebastian
F/C	9	(Philippines)	Nonoy Baclao	6 ft 5 in (1.96 m)	210 lb (95 kg)	1987–06–15	Ateneo
F/C	10	(Philippines)	Marion Magat (R/IN)	6 ft 6 in (1.98 m)	180 lb (82 kg)	1989–10–22	National-U
F	11	(United States)	Rome dela Rosa	6 ft 3 in (1.91 m)	185 lb (84 kg)	1990–12–11	San Beda
G	17	(Philippines)	Chris Exciminiano	6 ft 0 in (1.83 m)	185 lb (84 kg)	1988–11–17	Far Eastern
G/F	25	(Philippines)	Dondon Hontiveros	6 ft 2 in (1.88 m)	180 lb (82 kg)	1977–06–01	Cebu
C	26	(Philippines)	Samigue Eman	6 ft 9 in (2.06 m)	239 lb (108 kg)	1982–03–12	Mindanao
F/C	30	(United States)	Eric Menk	6 ft 6 in (1.98 m)	250 lb (113 kg)	1974–08–24	Lake Superior State
G	31	(Philippines)	RJ Jazul	5 ft 11 in (1.80 m)	170 lb (77 kg)	1986–04–11	Letran
F	35	(United States)	Tony dela Cruz (C)	6 ft 4 in (1.93 m)	209 lb (95 kg)	1978–08–24	UC Irvine
G	42	(Philippines)	JVee Casio	5 ft 10 in (1.78 m)	175 lb (79 kg)	1986–09–01	De La Salle
F	61	(Philippines)	Kevin Racal (R/IN)	6 ft 3 in (1.91 m)	175 lb (79 kg)	1991–05–16	Letran

Head coach

- (Philippines) Alex Compton (Cornell)

Assistant coach(es)

- (Philippines) Louie Alas (Adamson)
- (United States) Jeffrey Cariaso (Sonoma State)
- (Philippines) Topex Robinson (San Sebastian)
- (Philippines) Monch Gavieres (Letran)
- (Philippines) Franco Atienza (San Sebastian)

Team manager

- (Philippines) Dickie Bachmann^{[a]} (De La Salle)

Legend

- (C) Team captain
- (CI) Commissioner's Cup Import
- (GI) Governors' Cup Import
- (EI) EASL Import
- (DP) Unsigned draft pick
- (FA) Free agent
- (IN) Inactive
- (S) Suspended
- (R) Rookie
- Injured

Roster

- ^{a} also serves as Alaska's board governor.

== Broadcast notes ==
The Philippine Cup Finals aired on TV5 with simulcasts on Hyper (both in standard and high definition) and Cignal TV channel 198 (in high definition). TV5's radio arm, Radyo5 aired it as well. Fox Sports Asia airs the games as well on a delayed basis.

Cignal TV provided English-language coverage of the finals.

Game	Sports5			Cignal TV (English)		Fox Sports (English)	
Game	Play-by-play	Analyst(s)	Courtside reporters	Play-by-play	Analyst(s)	Play-by-play	Analyst(s)
Game 1	Magoo Marjon	Andy Jao and Ryan Gregorio	Rizza Diaz	same commentators with TV5		no broadcast	
Game 2	Charlie Cuna	Eric Reyes and Tim Cone	Sel Guevara	James Velasquez	Richard del Rosario	Nikko Ramos	Ronnie Magsanoc
Game 3	Magoo Marjon	Jolly Escobar and Charles Tiu	Apple David	James Velasquez	Carlo Pamintuan	no broadcast	
Game 4	Sev Sarmenta	Andy Jao and Ali Peek	Rizza Diaz	Aaron Atayde	Norman Black	Jude Turcuato	Vince Hizon
Game 5	Magoo Marjon	Dominic Uy and Tim Cone	Sel Guevara	Charlie Cuna	Luigi Trillo	Nikko Ramos	Vince Hizon
Game 6	Charlie Cuna	Quinito Henson and Tim Cone	Rizza Diaz	Aaron Atayde	Ryan Gregorio	Jude Turcuato	Ronnie Magsanoc
Game 7	Magoo Marjon	Dominic Uy and Tim Cone	Apple David	Charlie Cuna	Richard del Rosario	Nikko Ramos	Vince Hizon

- Additional Game 7 crew:
  - Trophy presentation: James Velasquez
  - Dugout celebration interviewer: Mara Aquino
