= Powerade Tigers draft history =

The Powerade Tigers first participated in the Philippine Basketball Association (PBA) draft as Coca-Cola Tigers, on January 13, 2002, months before their first PBA season. The Tigers bought the original franchise of the Pop Cola Panthers in 2002 after Pop-Cola disbanded after the 2001 season. Coca-Cola received the rights for all of the Pop-Cola's players and draftees.

Rafi Reavis became the team's first draft choice, the 2nd pick in the 2002 PBA draft. Different with the former expansion teams, Coke immediately won the All-Filipino Championship during their first season.

== Selections ==
Basketball positions
PG	Point guard
SG	Shooting guard
SF	Small forward
PF	Power forward
C	Center

Draft	Round	Pick	Player	Place of birth	Position	School
2002	1st	2nd	Rafi Reavis	United States	C	Coppin State University
2002	1st	10th	Leo Avenido	Philippines	SF	Far Eastern University
2002	2nd	11th	Gilbert Lao	Philippines	C	University of Santo Tomas
2002	2nd	17th	Jojo Manalo	Philippines	SG	Perpetual Help University
2002	3rd	25th	Jason Misolas	Philippines	SF	Letran College
2003	1st	9th	Reynel Hugnatan	Philippines	PF	University of Manila
2003	4th	35th	Jeffrey Sanders	Philippines	SG	Technological Institute of the Philippines
2004	1st	10th	Gary David	Philippines	SG	Lyceum University
2004	2nd	19th	Manny Ramos	Philippines	PF	De La Salle University
2004	3rd	24th	Rhagnee Sinco	Philippines	SF	Far Eastern University
2004	4th	27th	Warren Ybañez	Philippines	PG	PSBA
2005	1st	3rd	Dennis Miranda	Philippines	PG	Far Eastern University
2005	2nd	11th	Neil Rañeses	Philippines	SF	University of the Visayas
2005	2nd	12th	Al Magpayo	Philippines	SF	College of St. Benilde
2006	1st	3rd	Joseph Yeo	Philippines	SG	De La Salle University
2006	2nd	12th	R.J. Rizada	Philippines	SG	Far Eastern University
2006	2nd	14th	Manuel Caceres	Philippines	SF	PSBA
2006	2nd	15th	Chris Pacana	Philippines	PG	St. Francis College
2006	2nd	16th	Mike Gavino	Philippines	PF	University of the Philippines
2006	2nd	17th	Ronjay Enrile	Philippines	PG	Letran College
2010	2nd	18th	Jai Reyes	Philippines	PG	Ateneo de Manila University
2011	1st	1st	JV Casio	Philippines	PG	De La Salle University
2011	1st	4th	Marcio Lassiter	United States	SG/SF	Cal State Fullerton
2011	2nd	21st	Marc Agstin	Philippines	SF	Adamson University

=== Notes ===
1. All players entering the draft are Filipinos until proven otherwise.
2. Coca-cola have traded all of their draft rights to other teams from the 2007 to 2009 drafts.
