= 2009–10 Barangay Ginebra Kings season =

- Head coach: Jong Uichico
- General Manager: Samboy Lim
- Owner(s): Ginebra San Miguel, Inc.

Philippine Cup results
- Record: 12–6 (66.7%)
- Place: 3rd (tied)
- Playoff finish: Semifinals (by Alaska 4–0)

Fiesta Conference results
- Record: 9–9 (50%)
- Place: 5th (tied)
- Playoff finish: Quarterfinals (by Alaska 3–2)

Barangay Ginebra Kings seasons

The 2009–10 Barangay Ginebra Kings season was the 31st season of the franchise in the Philippine Basketball Association (PBA).

== Key dates ==
- August 2: The 2009 PBA Draft took place in Fort Bonifacio, Taguig.

== Draft picks ==
Round	Pick	Player	Height	Position	Nationality	College
1	8	Chris Timberlake	5'8"	Point guard	United States	North Florida
2	18	Orlando Daroya			Philippines	Arellano

== Roster ==
2009–10 Barangay Ginebra Kings roster
Players

Pos.	#	POB	Name	Height	Weight	DOB (YYYY–MM–DD)	From
G	1	(Philippines)	Celino Cruz	5 ft 10 in (1.78 m)	170 lb (77 kg)		Far Eastern
G	5	(United States)	Kevin White	5 ft 10 in (1.78 m)			West Hills
F	9	(Philippines)	JC Intal	6 ft 4 in (1.93 m)	200 lb (91 kg)		Ateneo
G/F	10	(Philippines)	Junthy Valenzuela	6 ft 2 in (1.88 m)	185 lb (84 kg)		SCSIT
G	11	(Philippines)	Willie Miller	5 ft 11 in (1.80 m)	195 lb (88 kg)		Letran
G	13	(Philippines)	Jayjay Helterbrand	5 ft 11 in (1.80 m)	170 lb (77 kg)		Kentucky State
G	14	(Philippines)	Johnny Abarrientos	5 ft 7 in (1.70 m)	161 lb (73 kg)		Far Eastern
C	18	(Philippines)	Yancy De Ocampo	6 ft 8 in (2.03 m)	200 lb (91 kg)		Saint Francis of Assisi
G	21	(Philippines)	Mike Cortez	6 ft 0 in (1.83 m)	170 lb (77 kg)		De La Salle
F/C	23	(Philippines)	Enrico Villanueva	6 ft 5 in (1.96 m)	220 lb (100 kg)		Ateneo
F	27	(United States)	Willy Wilson	6 ft 3 in (1.91 m)	215 lb (98 kg)		De La Salle
F/C	30	(United States)	Eric Menk (C)	6 ft 6 in (1.98 m)	220 lb (100 kg)		Lake Superior State
G	47	(Philippines)	Mark Caguioa	6 ft 0 in (1.83 m)	185 lb (84 kg)		Glendale CC (CA)
F/C	55	(Philippines)	John Ferriols	6 ft 4 in (1.93 m)	210 lb (95 kg)		USJ–R
G/F	71	(Philippines)	Ronald Tubid	6 ft 1 in (1.85 m)	180 lb (82 kg)		UE
F	80	(Philippines)	Sunday Salvacion	6 ft 3 in (1.91 m)	190 lb (86 kg)		St. Benilde
F	99	(United States)	Rudy Hatfield	6 ft 4 in (1.93 m)	220 lb (100 kg)		UM–Dearborn
F	25	(United States)	Awvee Storey (I)	6 ft 6 in (1.98 m)	225 lb (102 kg)		Arizona State
F	22	(United States)	Mildon Ambres (I)	6 ft 6 in (1.98 m)	213 lb (97 kg)		Southern Nazarene
F	5	(Canada)	Denham Brown (I)	6 ft 6 in (1.98 m)	220 lb (100 kg)		Connecticut
F/C	50	(United States)	Christopher Daniels (I)	6 ft 6 in (1.98 m)	220 lb (100 kg)		Georgia

Coaches
Head coach
- (Philippines) Jong Uichico (De La Salle)
Assistant(s)
- (Philippines) Art dela Cruz (San Sebastian)
- (Philippines) Marco Januz Sauler (De La Salle)
- (Philippines) Allan Caidic (UE)
- (Philippines) Johnny Abarrientos (Far Eastern)

Legend
- (DP) Unsigned draft pick
- (FA) Free agent
- (S) Suspended
- (I) Import
- Injured

== Philippine Cup ==
=== Eliminations ===
==== Standings ====
Pos	Team	W	L	PCT	GB	Qualification
1	Alaska Aces	13	5	.722 (Note: Head-to-head record: Alaska 2–0 San Miguel)	—	Advance to semifinals
2	San Miguel Beermen	13	5	.722	—	Advance to semifinals
3	Purefoods Tender Juicy Giants	12	6	.667 (Note: Head-to-head record: Purefoods 1–1 Barangay Ginebra; Purefoods 0, Barangay Ginebra 0; overall point differential: Purefoods +85, Barangay Ginebra +75)	1	Advance to quarterfinals
4	Barangay Ginebra Kings	12	6	.667	1	Advance to quarterfinals
5	Talk 'N Text Tropang Texters	11	7	.611	2	Advance to quarterfinals
6	Sta. Lucia Realtors	10	8	.556	3	Advance to wildcard round
7	Coca-Cola Tigers	6	12	.333 (Note: Head-to-head record: Burger King 1–1, Coca-Cola; Burger King +10, Coca-Cola −10)	7	Advance to wildcard round
8	Burger King Whoppers	6	12	.333	7	Advance to wildcard round
9	Rain or Shine Elasto Painters	4	14	.222	9	Advance to wildcard round
10	Barako Bull Energy Boosters	3	15	.167	10	
—	Smart Gilas (G)	3	6	.333	5.5	Guest team (Note: Smart Gilas's results do not count in the standings.)

Source: PBA.ph
(G) Guests

==== Game log ====
===== Eliminations =====
2009–10 PBA Philippine Cup game log
October

Game	Date	Opponent	Score	High points	High rebounds	High assists	Location Attendance	Record
1	October 14	San Miguel	93–86	Menk (18)	Menk, Tubid (9)	Helterbrand (9)	Araneta Coliseum	1–0
2	October 18	Purefoods	95–87	Helterbrand (19)	Wilson (7)	Helterbrand (9)	Araneta Coliseum	2–0
3	October 23	Smart Gilas*	100–72	Tubid (22)	Villanueva (11)	Wilson (6)	Cuneta Astrodome	
4	October 25	Alaska	96–105	Helterbrand (23)	Alvarez (10)	Helterbrand (7)	Araneta Coliseum	2–1

November

Game	Date	Opponent	Score	High points	High rebounds	High assists	Location Attendance	Record
5	November 6	Barako Bull	94–86	Baguio (22)	Wilson (9)	Cruz (7)	Cuneta Astrodome	3–1
6	November 8	Rain or Shine	86–87	Baguio (17)	Wilson (9)	Baguio (6)	Araneta Coliseum	4–1
7	November 14	Burger King	83–79	Villanueva (16)	Wilson (8)	Villanueva, 2 others (3)	Tubod, Lanao del Norte	5–1
8	November 18	Sta. Lucia	72–93	Menk (14)	Menk, Intal (6)	Helterbrand (5)	Araneta Coliseum	5–2
9	November 25	Talk 'N Text	72–87	Tubid (21)	Menk (10)	Menk (4)	Araneta Coliseum	5–3
10	November 27	Coca Cola	113–104	Tubid (33)	Alvarez(9)	Abarrientos (6)	Ynares Center	6–3

December

Game	Date	Opponent	Score	High points	High rebounds	High assists	Location Attendance	Record
11	December 4	Barako Bull	88–76	Tubid (30)	Menk (10)	Abarrientos (6)	Araneta Coliseum	7–3
12	December 6	Purefoods	81–89	Baguio (19)	Mamaril (6)	Menk (4)	Araneta Coliseum	7–4
13	December 12	Rain or Shine	101–97	Menk (21)	Tubid (10)	Baguio (6)	Tacloban City	8–4
14	December 16	Sta. Lucia	88–93	Tubid (21)	Villanueva (13)	Tubid, Abarrientos (4)	Araneta Coliseum	8–5
15	December 20	San Miguel	86–91 (OT)	Tubid (21)	Intal (10)	Baguio (4)	Araneta Coliseum	8–6
16	December 25	Coca Cola	106–97	Intal (20)	Wilson (11)	Wilson, Baguio (4)	Cuneta Astrodome	9–6

January

Game	Date	Opponent	Score	High points	High rebounds	High assists	Location Attendance	Record
17	January 6	Talk 'N Text	105–82	Intal (19)	Intal (8)	Cruz (7)	Araneta Coliseum	10–6
18	January 9	Alaska	93–90	Baguio (20)	Intal (11)	Baguio (5)	Batangas City	11–6
19	January 17	Burger King	122–104	Intal, Baguio (24)	Tubid, 2 others (8)	Intal (5)	Araneta Coliseum	12–6

2009–10 schedule

===== Playoffs =====
2009–10 PBA Philippine Cup playoffs game log
Quarterfinals

Game	Date	Opponent	Score	High points	High rebounds	High assists	Location Attendance	Record
1	January 29	Talk 'N Text	92–107	Intal (19)	Villanueva (12)	Cruz (4)	Araneta Coliseum	0–1
2	January 31	Talk 'N Text	105–106	Intal (23)	Villanueva (14)	Cruz (4)	Araneta Coliseum	0–2
3	February 3	Talk 'N Text	102–97	Intal (25)	Intal, Wilson (10)	Villanueva (4)	Araneta Coliseum	1–2
4	February 5	Talk 'N Text	27–20 (by forfeit)	n/a	n/a	n/a	Araneta Coliseum	2–2
5	February 7	Talk 'N Text	113–100	Intal (28)	Menk (14)	Intal, 2 others (4)	Araneta Coliseum	3–2

Semifinals

Game	Date	Opponent	Score	High points	High rebounds	High assists	Location Attendance	Record
1	February 10	Alaska	79–104	Caguioa (23)	Salvacion, Intal (7)	Helterbrand (4)	Araneta Coliseum	0–1
2	February 12	Alaska	82–90	Villanueva (17)	Villanueva (11)	Helterbrand (8)	Cuneta Astrodome	0–2
3	February 14	Alaska	88–91	Caguioa (20)	Caguioa, 2 others (9)	Caguioa, 2 others (3)	Araneta Coliseum	0–3
4	February 17	Alaska	95–102	Helterbrand (20)	Villanueva (6)	Helterbrand (6)	Araneta Coliseum	0–4

Battle for Third

Game	Date	Opponent	Score	High points	High rebounds	High assists	Location Attendance	Record
1	February 10	San Miguel	88–95				Araneta Coliseum	

2009–10 schedule

== Fiesta Conference ==
=== Eliminations ===
==== Standings ====
Pos	Team	W	L	PCT	GB	Qualification
1	Talk 'N Text Tropang Texters	15	3	.833	—	Advance to semifinals
2	San Miguel Beermen	13	5	.722 (Note: Second seed playoff: San Miguel 88, Derby Ace 83)	2	Advance to semifinals
3	Derby Ace Llamados	13	5	.722	2	Advance to quarterfinals
4	Alaska Aces	11	7	.611	4	Advance to quarterfinals
5	Barangay Ginebra Kings	9	9	.500 (Note: Fifth seed playoff: Barangay Ginebra 115, Rain or Shine 88)	6	Advance to quarterfinals
6	Rain or Shine Elasto Painters	9	9	.500	6	Advance to wildcard round
7	Coca-Cola Tigers	8	10	.444	7	Advance to wildcard round
8	Sta. Lucia Realtors	5	13	.278	10	Advance to wildcard round
9	Air21 Express	4	14	.222	11	Advance to wildcard round
10	Barako Energy Coffee Masters	3	15	.167	12	

Source: PBA.ph

== Transactions ==
=== Pre-season ===
Barangay Ginebra Kings

Players Added

Via Draft

- Chris Timberlake
- Orlando Daroya

Via Free Agency

- Kevin White (From Talk 'N Text)

Via Trade

- Enrico Villanueva (From Purefoods)
- Rich Alvarez (From Purefoods)
- Celino Cruz (From Purefoods)
- Paolo Bugia (From Purefoods)
- Pocholo Villanueva (From Burger King)
Players Lost

Via Free Agency

- Junjun Cabatu
- Macky Escalona
- JR Aquino
- Chico Lanete (To Burger King)
- Chris Pacana (To Sta. Lucia)

Via Trade

- Paul Artadi (To Purefoods)
- Rafi Reavis (To Purefoods)
- Chris Timberlake (To Purefoods)
- Orlando Daroya (to Burger King)

== Philippine Cup ==
=== Free agents ===
==== Additions ====
Player	Signed	Former team
Johnny Abarrientos	November	none

=== Mid-season break ===
==== Trades ====
March 8, 2010	To Air21 Rich Alvarez; Doug Kramer first round pick (2010)	To Barangay Ginebra Yancy de Ocampo

=== Free agents ===
==== Additions ====
Player	Signed	Former team
Rudy Hatfield	March, 2010	none
John Ferriols	March 17, 2010	Alaska

==== Subtractions ====
Player	Signed	New team
Johnny Abarrientos	March, 2010	none

=== Fiesta Conference ===
==== Trades ====
April 28, 2010	To Alaska Cyrus Baguio	To Barangay Ginebra Willie Miller
June 12, 2010	To Air21 Billy Mamaril	To Barangay Ginebra Mike Cortez

==== Imports recruited ====
Team	Player	Debuted	Final
Brgy. Ginebra Kings	Awvee Storey (1/4)	March 21, 2010	April 18, 2010
Brgy. Ginebra Kings	Mildon Ambres (2/4)	April 30, 2010	May 30, 2010
Brgy. Ginebra Kings	Denham Brown (3/4)	June 5, 2010	June 23, 2010
Brgy. Ginebra Kings	Chris Daniels (4/4)	July 2, 2010	July 18, 2010
