= Willy Wilson =

Filipino basketball player (born 1980)

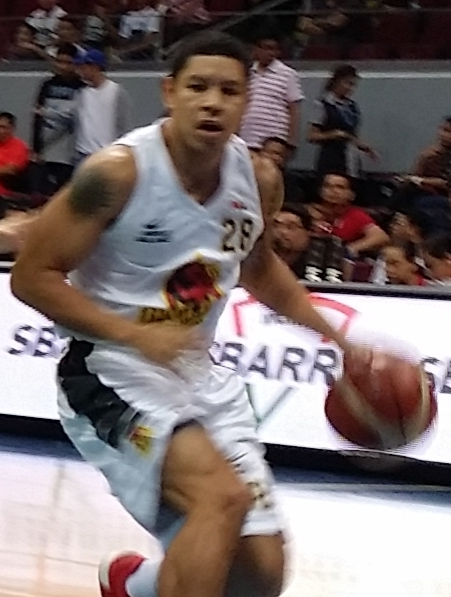
- Wilson in 2015

Personal information
- Born: January 30, 1980 (age 46) Los Angeles, California, U.S.
- Listed height: 6 ft 3 in (1.91 m)
- Listed weight: 215 lb (98 kg)

Career information
- High school: John H. Francis Polytechnic (Sun Valley, California)
- College: De La Salle
- PBA draft: 2004: 2nd round, 15th overall pick
- Drafted by: Alaska Aces
- Playing career: 2004–2018
- Position: Power forward
- Coaching career: 2020–present

Career history

Playing
- 2004–2006: Alaska Aces
- 2006–2008: San Miguel Beermen
- 2008–2013: Barangay Ginebra Kings / Barangay Ginebra San Miguel
- 2013–2016: Barako Bull Energy Cola / Barako Bull Energy
- 2016–2018: Phoenix Pulse Fuel Masters

Coaching
- 2020–2025: Phoenix Super LPG Fuel Masters / Phoenix Fuel Masters (assistant)
- 2021–2022: Limitless Appmasters
- 2025–2026: Phoenix Fuel Masters

Career highlights
- As player: PBA champion (2008 Fiesta); PBA All-Defensive Team (2011); 4× UAAP Champion (1998–2001); As coach: PBA 3x3 champion (2021 – First conference)
Medals
Men's 3x3 basketball
Representing Philippines
Southeast Asian Games
Bronze medal – third place	2021 Hanoi	Team

William Joel Ventenilla Wilson (born January 30, 1980) is a Filipino-American professional basketball coach and former player who last served as head coach for the Phoenix Fuel Masters of the Philippine Basketball Association (PBA). He played for four teams in the PBA. He spent his college years playing in De La Salle University before being drafted fifteenth overall by the Alaska Aces in the 2004 PBA draft.

== College career ==
In 1998, Wilson came over from the US to join the De La Salle Green Archers in the UAAP. Although he joined the team late, he made an impact off the bench in his rookie season with his versatility, outside shooting, and defense. That year, with a new coach in Franz Pumaren and former Rookie of the Year Renren Ritualo leading the way, the Archers went 13–1 and went on to win the championship over the FEU Tamaraws. From 1998 to 2001, the Archers won four straight titles. In his final season, the Archers went 13–1 but this time lost to the Ateneo Blue Eagles.

In 2023, Wilson was honored as the De La Salle Alumni Association's Sports Awardee. He and other members of La Salle's championship-winning teams received championship rings that year.

== Professional career ==
=== Alaska Aces ===
In the 2004 PBA draft, Wilson was drafted 15th overall by the Alaska Aces. He was among the sophomores selected to play in the Rookies vs Sophomores game during the 2005 All-Star Weekend.

=== San Miguel Beermen ===
Wilson then got picked up from free agency by the San Miguel Beermen, joining them in time for a preseason tournament in Guam. In the 2006–07 Philippine Cup, he led the entire league in free throw shooting percentage, with 86.5%. San Miguel made the finals that conference, where they lost to the Barangay Ginebra Kings.

=== Barangay Ginebra Kings / San Miguel ===
In 2008, Wilson was traded to Barangay Ginebra in a four-team trade. He was part of the team that won the Fiesta Conference that year.

In a win over the Burger King Whoppers, Wilson scored 15 points as Ginebra guaranteed themselves a slot in the quarterfinals.

For the 2010–11 season, Ginebra placed third in the Philippine Cup, and second in the Commissioner's Cup. In the Governors' Cup, he had a larger role as Rudy Hatfield left the team. In a win over the B-Meg Llamados, he had 12 points and seven rebounds off the bench. Ginebra finished fourth for that conference. He and rookie John Wilson made the All-Defensive team that season.

=== Barako Bull Energy ===
On November 3, 2013, during the 2013 PBA Draft, Wilson and Rico Maierhofer were dealt to the Barako Bull Energy Cola for James Forrester.

Barako started the 2014–15 Philippine Cup with five straight losses. They then bounced back with four wins in their next five games including a win over Alaska in which Wilson had 13 points. During the Commissioner's Cup, he missed several games due to a MCL injury.

In the offseason, Wilson signed a one-year contract extension. In a 2015–16 Philippine Cup win over the Meralco Bolts, he scored 17 points. In his first five games of the season, he averaged career-highs of 12.8 points, 10.6 rebounds, 3.2 assists, and 35.8 minutes as they started with a record of 3–2. He then led with 20 points and 20 rebounds in a win over the TnT Tropang Giga. As a result of that performance, he received Player of the Week honors. At the end of the elimination round, he averaged a career-high 17.7 points with 12.0 rebounds. In the playoffs, they lost in the first round to the GlobalPort Batang Pier.

=== Phoenix franchise ===
In 2016, Phoenix Petroleum Philippines, Inc. bought the Barako Bull team. Now renamed as the Phoenix Fuel Masters, they first competed in the 2016 Commissioner's Cup. In a loss to the Rain or Shine Elasto Painters that conference, he led with 21 points and nine rebounds.

After his breakout season, Wilson signed a two-year extension with Phoenix. Phoenix started the 2016–17 Philippine Cup with a 2–2 record. He then had to miss several games due to food poisoning. In his return against the NLEX Road Warriors, he contributed 12 points and nine rebounds as they got the win. He then scored 14 points in a loss to Alaska.

During the 2017–18 season, he signed a one-year extension to stay with the team. That season, he got another Player of the Week citation after scoring 19 points on a perfect 7 for 7 shooting clip in a win over Ginebra. In their Governors' Cup match against San Miguel, he and several of Phoenix's players and management were fined 5,000 for entering the court when their teammate Calvin Abueva appeared to have his neck grabbed by San Miguel's import Kevin Murphy.

Wilson wasn't able to play during the 2019 Philippine Cup as he was recovering from bone spurs. After the 2019 season, he retired and soon joined the coaching staff of Phoenix.

== Coaching career ==
Beginning in the 2020 PBA season, Wilson became an assistant coach for Phoenix. His job is mentoring Phoenix's big men. When the PBA 3x3 was established, he handled Phoenix's 3x3 team, the Limitless Appmasters. They won the first conference of the 2021 season.

In 2022, Wilson coached the Philippines' men's national 3x3 team in the SEA Games, where they won bronze. For the 2022 FIBA Asia 3x3 Cup, he was still on the coaching staff, but Lester Del Rosario now headed the team. He also coaches Xavier School's basketball team.

== PBA career statistics ==
Legend
GP	Games played	MPG	Minutes per game
FG%	Field-goal percentage	3P%	3-point field-goal percentage	FT%	Free-throw percentage
RPG	Rebounds per game	APG	Assists per game	SPG	Steals per game
BPG	Blocks per game	PPG	Points per game	**Bold**	Career high

=== Season-by-season averages ===
Year	Team	GP	MPG	FG%	3P%	FT%	RPG	APG	SPG	BPG	PPG
2004–05	Alaska	43	7.5	.443	.000	.600	1.5	.5	.3	.0	1.5
2005–06	Alaska	36	10.6	.398	.222	**.889**	2.0	.7	.3	.0	3.0
2006–07	San Miguel	**61**	18.9	.545	**1.000**	.841	4.7	1.0	.3	.1	5.6
2007–08	Magnolia	21	11.5	.488	.000	.765	2.2	.7	.3	.1	2.6
2007–08	Barangay Ginebra	21	11.5	.488	.000	.765	2.2	.7	.3	.1	2.6
2008–09	Barangay Ginebra	39	23.0	.507	—	.679	4.9	1.0	.4	.2	4.9
2009–10	Barangay Ginebra	44	20.1	.497	—	.787	4.7	.8	.3	.2	5.9
2010–11	Barangay Ginebra	52	19.2	**.570**	—	.784	4.4	1.2	.3	.1	2.6
2011–12	Barangay Ginebra	39	20.0	.401	.000	.701	4.7	1.0	.4	.2	5.0
2012–13	Barangay Ginebra	35	15.7	.456	.000	.744	3.3	.6	.2	.0	3.8
2013–14	Barako Bull	33	18.9	.400	.100	.651	4.3	1.1	.2	.0	3.6
2014–15	Barako Bull	28	21.9	.508	.263	.679	3.9	1.1	.5	.1	6.0
2015–16	Barako Bull	34	**33.0**	.507	.333	.773	**8.9**	**2.5**	.5	**.3**	**11.6**
2015–16	Phoenix	34	**33.0**	.507	.333	.773	**8.9**	**2.5**	.5	**.3**	**11.6**
2016–17	Phoenix	29	19.6	.496	.400	.844	5.1	1.4	.5	.1	5.3
2017–18	Phoenix	35	20.0	.401	.280	.788	4.1	1.2	**.7**	.2	4.6
Career		529	18.6	.483	.263	.761	4.2	1.0	.4	.1	5.0

== National team career ==
Wilson got to play in the PBA before he was drafted as he played on the Cebuana Lhuillier-RP Team, which was a guest team in the 2003 PBA Invitational championship. Following their PBA stint, they won the Philippines its third straight SEABA championship. The win also booked them a spot in the 2003 ABC Championship, where they finished in 15th place out of 16 countries.

== Off the court ==
Beginning in UAAP Season 84, Wilson covered UAAP games as an analyst. Since 2022, he has also written articles for NBA.com Philippines.

== Personal life ==
In 2010, Wilson married Maria del Rosario, a former courtside reporter. Since then, they have had a daughter, Keliya, and a son, Cameron.
