= Chris Ellis (basketball) =

Filipino-American basketball player

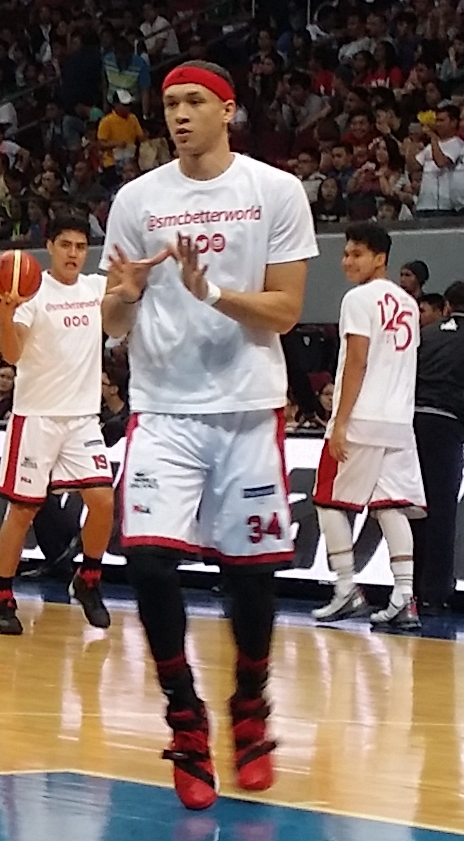
- Ellis in 2015

Personal information
- Born: December 5, 1988 (age 37) Oceanside, California, U.S.
- Listed height: 6 ft 4 in (1.93 m)
- Listed weight: 185 lb (84 kg)

Career information
- College: Mary Hardin–Baylor
- PBA draft: 2012: 1st round, 6th overall pick
- Drafted by: Barangay Ginebra San Miguel
- Playing career: 2012–2020
- Position: Small forward / shooting guard

Career history
- 2012–2017: Barangay Ginebra San Miguel
- 2019: Luang Prabang

Career highlights
- PBA champion (2016 Governors'); 3× PBA All-Star (2013, 2014, 2017); PBA All-Star Slam Dunk champion (2013)

Christopher Allan Bansil Ellis (born December 5, 1988) is a Filipino-American professional basketball player in the Philippine Basketball Association (PBA). He was selected 6th overall in the 2012 PBA draft by Barangay Ginebra San Miguel. He is of Filipino descent.

Ellis won the 2013 PBA All-Star Weekend Slamdunk Competition during his rookie season in Digos, Davao del Sur.

Ellis was traded to the Blackwater Elite in August 2017 along with Dave Marcelo, in exchange for Art dela Cruz and Raymond Aguilar. But he had not played for his new team, initially after he was diagnosed with acute renal disease or a kidney issue. In 2019, after his full recovery, Ellis played for Luang Prabang Basketball Team of the Thailand Basketball Super League.

== PBA career statistics ==
Legend
| GP | Games played | MPG | Minutes per game |
| FG% | Field-goal percentage | 3P% | 3-point field-goal percentage | FT% | Free-throw percentage |
| RPG | Rebounds per game | APG | Assists per game | SPG | Steals per game |
| BPG | Blocks per game | PPG | Points per game | **Bold** | Career high |

=== Season-by-season averages ===
| Year | Team | GP | MPG | FG% | 3P% | FT% | RPG | APG | SPG | BPG | PPG |
|---|---|---|---|---|---|---|---|---|---|---|---|
| 2012–13 | Barangay Ginebra | **52** | **26.3** | .449 | .280 | .531 | **4.6** | **1.4** | **.7** | **.4** | **8.1** |
| 2013–14 | Barangay Ginebra | 43 | 21.9 | .443 | .286 | .688 | 3.8 | 1.2 | **.7** | .2 | 7.5 |
| 2014–15 | Barangay Ginebra | 22 | 13.9 | .422 | .222 | .577 | 2.0 | .9 | .3 | .1 | 4.0 |
| 2015–16 | Barangay Ginebra | 32 | 21.1 | .407 | .224 | .636 | 3.8 | 1.3 | .5 | .3 | 5.8 |
| 2016–17 | Barangay Ginebra | 45 | 14.9 | **.467** | **.351** | **.707** | 2.5 | 1.2 | .6 | .3 | 5.0 |
| Career | | 194 | 20.4 | .442 | .275 | .62 7 | 3.5 | 1.2 | .6 | .3 | 6.4 |
