= Celino Cruz =

Filipino basketball player (born 1977)

Personal information
- Born: July 22, 1977 (age 49) Hagonoy, Bulacan, Philippines
- Listed height: 5 ft 9 in (1.75 m)
- Listed weight: 170 lb (77 kg)

Career information
- High school: St. Anne's Catholic High School (Hagonoy, Bulacan)
- College: MLQU (1996); FEU (1997–2000)
- PBA draft: 2002: 1st round, 19th overall pick
- Drafted by: Talk 'N Text Phone Pals
- Playing career: 2004–2012
- Position: Point guard
- Number: 1

Career history
- 2004–2005: Shell Turbo Chargers
- 2005–2008: Red Bull Barako
- 2008–2009: Air21 Express / Burger King Titans
- 2009: Purefoods Tender Juicy Giants
- 2009–2010: Barangay Ginebra Kings
- 2010–2012: Powerade Tigers
- 2012–2013: Barako Bull Energy

Career highlights
- PBA champion (2005–06 Fiesta); UAAP champion (1997); 2× PBL champion (2000 Chairman's, 2001 Alaxan-Chairman's Cup, 2002 Chairman's Cup); CUSA champion (1996); CUSA MVP (1996)

Celino Salazar Cruz (born July 22, 1977) is a Filipino former professional basketball player. A deadly left-handed shooter, he is best known for his clutch plays. Cruz played eight seasons in the Philippine Basketball Association (PBA). After playing for the MLQU Stallions and the FEU Tamaraws in college, Cruz was drafted by the Talk 'N Text Phone Pals 19th overall in the 2002 PBA draft. Before entering the PBA, he played for several teams in the semi-pro Philippine Basketball League (PBL). He started his professional career as a rookie with the Shell Turbo Chargers in the 2004–05 PBA season, and later played for the Red Bull Barako before being traded to the Burger King Whoopers and then the Purefoods Tender Juicy Giants. He then closed out his career with stints with Barangay Ginebra, the Powerade Tigers, and a return to Barako.

== Amateur career ==
=== College career ===
Cruz first played for the MLQU Stallions in the Colleges and Universities Sports Association (CUSA). In 1996, he was the CUSA's MVP, and led the Stallions to their first league title. He then played for the FEU Tamaraws from 1997 to 2000. In 1997, Cruz led the Tamaraws to a finals sweep over the De La Salle Green Archers. They tried to defend their title the following season, but they lost twice to the Green Archers.

Cruz turned down the opportunity to be drafted into the Philippine Basketball Association (PBA) to play one more season with FEU in 2000. Throughout the season, FEU leaned on its consistency to stay among the top teams in the league. However, he was suspended for one game due to receiving two technical fouls. In Game 1 of the Final Four against the Ateneo de Manila Blue Eagles, he made the game-winning assist. In Game 2, he had 16 points as FEU moved on to the finals. In the finals, they were swept by the Green Archers. He did not return to FEU for the UAAP's 64th season.

=== Philippine Basketball League ===
Cruz first played in the Philippine Basketball League (PBL) for the Welcoat House Paints in 2000. He played a key role in the backcourt of Welcoat, helping them win the 2000 Chairman's Cup. He turned down the opportunity to be drafted into the PBA for another conference with Welcoat, with the chance to help Welcoat capture its fourth straight title. However, in the 2000–01 Challenge Cup, they lost in the finals to Shark Energy Drink. They got their revenge on Shark Energy during the Alaxan-Chairman's Cup, sweeping them 4–0 in the finals. Shark Energy then beat Welcoat in the 2001–02 Alaxan-Challenge Cup, 4–1.

Cruz then switched PBL teams, joining the Hapee-Nenaco-Ateneo de Manila Blue Eagles beginning in the 2002 Chairman's Cup. They were able to win the title that conference 3–1, as he made two game-sealing free throws in Game 4 of the finals. He then had a stint with the John O team.

== Professional career ==
=== Shell Turbo Chargers (2004–05) ===
Cruz had been drafted 19th overall by the Talk 'N Text Phone Pals during the 2002 PBA draft. In 2004, Cruz was brought in to the PBA by the Shell Turbo Chargers. He made his PBA debut during the 2004–05 season at the age of 27.

=== Red Bull Barako (2005–2008) ===
With Shell leaving the PBA, Cruz and his Shell teammates were placed into a dispersal draft. He was drafted second overall in that draft by the Red Bull Barako, who acquired their pick from the Sta. Lucia Realtors. That season, Red Bull became known for their physical style of play, which led to their success. This also led to them getting into fights, such as when he hit an Alaska Aces player, for which he was fined ₱20,000. In Game 7 of the semifinals, he had five points in the clutch, as well as a block and rebound that brought Red Bull into the finals over Barangay Ginebra. Red Bull went on to win the finals over the Purefoods Chunkee Giants. They also made it to the 2006 PBA Philippine Cup finals in a rematch against Purefoods, but this time Purefoods won the series in six games.

During the 2007–08 Philippine Cup, Cruz scored 15 of his career-high 20 points in the third quarter during their win over the Air21 Express. He had more minutes in this game as Red Bull had just traded away several of its players. Later on during the conference, he and Cyrus Baguio both contracted chickenpox causing them to miss several games. He came back in time to contribute in Red Bull's semifinals series against Purefoods.

=== Air21 Express / Burger King Titans (2008–2009) ===
On December 27, 2008, Cruz and Baguio were traded to the Air21 Express in exchange for two of Air21's draft picks.

For the 2009 Fiesta Conference, the team became known as the Burger King Titans. They brought in head coach Yeng Guiao, who had coached Cruz before with Barako. In a win over Ginebra, he made a clutch three-pointer that sealed the win.

=== Purefoods (2009) ===
On April 17, 2009, Cruz was traded from Burger King to the Purefoods TJ Giants for forward Aaron Aban.

=== Barangay Ginebra (2009–2010) ===
On August 3, 2009, Barangay Ginebra traded Paul Artadi, Rafi Reavis, and the rights to 2009 eighth overall pick Chris Timberlake for Enrico Villanueva, Rich Alvarez, Cruz, and Paolo Bugia of Purefoods. Burger King acted as the conduit team, trading Pocholo Villanueva to Ginebra and acquiring the rights to 2009 18th overall pick Orlando Daroya and two future draft picks. In a game against Talk 'N Text, he fractured his left hand, and could not play the rest of the game.

=== Powerade (2010–2012) ===
At the end of the 2009–10 PBA season, he was released by the Barangay Ginebra Kings. Days after, he was signed by the Powerade Tigers as a free agent. This would be his third time that he played for a team owned by the San Miguel Corporation. He played a key role on his first year as its starting point guard. Together with Gary David, they became a one-two punch for their offense.

In the 2011 offseason, Powerade selected JVee Casio and Marcio Lassiter with the first and fourth picks in the 2011 PBA draft respectively. Together with David, they became a new "Big 3" on offense. In a win over the Shopinas.com Clickers during the 2011–12 Philippine Cup, Cruz scored 15 points, stepping up for a temporarily injured Casio. Despite entering the playoffs as the eighth-seeded team, Powerade went on to stun the top ranked B-MEG Llamados in the quarterfinals and upset Rain or Shine in the semifinals to make the finals.

=== Return to Barako (2012–2013) ===
On April 20, 2012, Cruz and Lassiter were traded to the Petron Blaze Boosters for Rey Guevarra, Rabeh Al-Hussaini, and Lordy Tugade. A few days later, on May 1, 2012, he and Carlo Sharma were traded back to Barako for Dorian Peña. This would be the seventh team of his career. In a win over Ginebra during the 2012–13 Philippine Cup, he scored eight of his 10 points in the third quarter. However, during the conference, he fractured his thumb when he fell from a folding chair trying to fix a ceiling light in his home. Before the start of the next conference, the Commissioner's Cup, he fractured it again when his thumb got caught in Meralco Bolts rookie Cliff Hodge's playing shorts during a practice game. Before the start of the 2013–14 season, he was cut from the team.

== National team career ==
Cruz was on the Philippine men's national team that finished 15th out of 16 teams in the 2003 ABC Championship. Later that year, he was also on the team that competed in the 2003 SEA Games. In a win over Indonesia in the semifinals, he played almost the entire game as his backcourt partner Dennis Madrid was still recovering from a groin injury he sustained during a practice session. Against Malaysia, he scored 13 points as the Philippines won their 12th overall basketball gold medal.

== Personal life ==
Cruz is married to Maymay Pascual. They have a daughter, Claire, and a son, Andres. After retiring, Cruz became one of the assistant coaches of the FEU Baby Tamaraws. He didn't last long in the role as some time later he and his family moved to the US. They are currently based in Sacramento.

In 2006, Cruz was given the "Gintong Kabataang Propesyonal" award by the provincial government of Bulacan.

== PBA career statistics ==
Legend
GP	Games played	MPG	Minutes per game
FG%	Field-goal percentage	3P%	3-point field-goal percentage	FT%	Free-throw percentage
RPG	Rebounds per game	APG	Assists per game	SPG	Steals per game
BPG	Blocks per game	PPG	Points per game	**Bold**	Career high

=== Season-by-season averages ===
Year	Team	GP	MPG	FG%	3P%	FT%	RPG	APG	SPG	BPG	PPG
2004–05	Shell	46	13.9	.388	.357	.700	1.6	1.4	.6	.0	3.1
2005–06	Red Bull	**58**	20.9	.417	.384	.744	3.2	1.6	**.9**	**.1**	4.6
2006–07	Red Bull	55	20.1	**.454**	.379	.750	2.5	2.1	.6	.0	6.2
2007–08	Red Bull	46	**22.2**	.376	.355	.705	**3.3**	2.6	.8	.0	**8.0**
2008–09	Red Bull	36	17.0	.376	.360	.772	2.8	1.9	.6	**.1**	5.5
2008–09	Air21 / Burger King	36	17.0	.376	.360	.772	2.8	1.9	.6	**.1**	5.5
2008–09	Purefoods	36	17.0	.376	.360	.772	2.8	1.9	.6	**.1**	5.5
2009–10	Barangay Ginebra	38	18.1	.395	.355	.692	1.9	1.8	.6	.0	4.3
2010–11	Powerade	21	21.0	.349	.339	.750	2.2	**2.9**	.7	**.1**	4.8
2011–12	Powerade	44	16.6	.377	**.456**	.652	2.2	2.0	.6	**.1**	4.1
2012–13	Barako Bull	19	14.5	.231	.159	**.882**	1.1	1.2	.3	.0	3.1
Career		363	18.5	.389	.361	.734	2.4	1.9	.7	.0	5.0
