= 2012–13 Barangay Ginebra San Miguel season =

- Head coach: Siot Tanquincen (September–December 2012); Alfrancis Chua (January–July 2013); Ato Agustin (July 2013–present)
- General manager: Samboy Lim (September 2012 –July 2013); Alfrancis Chua (July 2013–present)
- Owners: Ginebra San Miguel, Inc. (a San Miguel Corporation subsidiary)

Philippine Cup results
- Record: 7–7 (50%)
- Place: 6th
- Playoff finish: Quarterfinalist (eliminated by Rain or Shine, 1–2)

Commissioner's Cup results
- Record: 7–7 (50%)
- Place: 7th
- Playoff finish: Runner-up

Governors' Cup results
- Record: 3–6 (33.3%)
- Place: 8th
- Playoff finish: Quarterfinalist (defeated by Petron Blaze in one game)

Barangay Ginebra San Miguel seasons

The 2012–13 Barangay Ginebra San Miguel season was the 34th season of the franchise in the Philippine Basketball Association (PBA).

== Key dates ==
- August 19: The 2012 PBA Draft took place in Robinson's Midtown Mall, Manila.
- January 1: Alfrancis Chua was assigned as head coach; Siot Tanquingcen slides down as lead assistant coach.
- July 26: Due to promotion of Samboy Lim as corporate official, Alfrancis Chua was assigned to replace Lim. Ato Agustin was promoted to head coach replacing Chua.

== Draft picks ==
Round	Pick	Player	Position	Nationality	College
1	6	Chris Ellis	F	United States	Mary Hardin-Baylor
1	8	Keith Jensen	F	United States	New York
3	8	Jerick Cañada	G	Philippines	Adamson
4	5	Paul Zamar	G	Philippines	East
5	2	JR Buensuceso	G	United States	Brigham Young-Hawaii
6	1	Elliot Tan	G	United States	Biola

== Roster ==
2012–13 Barangay Ginebra San Miguel roster
Players
Coaches

Pos.	#	POB	Name	Height	Weight	DOB (YYYY–MM–DD)	From
C	2	(Philippines)	Billy Mamaril	6 ft 6 in (1.98 m)	225 lb (102 kg)		Bakersfield
PG	3	(United States)	Urbiztondo, Joshua	6 ft 1 in (1.85 m)	185 lb (84 kg)		Fresno Pacific
PG	5	(Philippines)	LA Tenorio	5 ft 8 in (1.73 m)	155 lb (70 kg)		Ateneo
PG	9	(Philippines)	Robert Labagala	5 ft 9 in (1.75 m)	170 lb (77 kg)		UE
F	10	(Philippines)	Rico Maierhofer	6 ft 5 in (1.96 m)	180 lb (82 kg)		De La Salle
G	13	(Philippines)	Jayjay Helterbrand (C)	5 ft 11 in (1.80 m)	170 lb (77 kg)		Kentucky State
F/C	21	(Philippines)	Kerby Raymundo	6 ft 6 in (1.98 m)	215 lb (98 kg)		Letran
F/C	25	(Philippines)	Japeth Aguilar	6 ft 10 in (2.08 m)	265 lb (120 kg)		Western Kentucky
F	28	(United States)	Willy Wilson	6 ft 3 in (1.91 m)	200 lb (91 kg)		De La Salle
F	34	(United States)	Chris Ellis (R)	6 ft 5 in (1.96 m)	185 lb (84 kg)		Mary Hardin–Baylor
G/F	45	(Philippines)	Mac Baracael	6 ft 3 in (1.91 m)	190 lb (86 kg)		Far Eastern
SG	47	(Philippines)	Mark Caguioa	6 ft 0 in (1.83 m)	190 lb (86 kg)		Glendale CC (CA)
C	15	(United States)	Herbert Hill (CI)	6 ft 10 in (2.08 m)	240 lb (109 kg)		Providence
C	22	(United States)	Vernon Macklin (CI)	6 ft 10 in (2.08 m)	227 lb (103 kg)		Florida
F/C	44	(United States)	Dior Lowhorn (GI)	6 ft 7 in (2.01 m)	230 lb (104 kg)		San Francisco

Head coach

- (Philippines) Ato Agustin (Lyceum)

Assistant coach(es)

- (Philippines) Jorge Gallent (Far Eastern)
- (Philippines) Boyzie Zamar
- (Philippines) Art dela Cruz (San Sebastian)
- (Philippines) Freddie Abuda (Cebu)

Team manager

- (Philippines) Alfrancis Chua (UST)

Legend

- (C) Team captain
- (CI) Commissioner's Cup Import
- (GI) Governors' Cup Import
- (EI) EASL Import
- (DP) Unsigned draft pick
- (FA) Free agent
- (IN) Inactive
- (S) Suspended
- (R) Rookie
- Injured

Roster

== Philippine Cup ==
=== Eliminations ===
==== Standings ====
Pos	Team	W	L	PCT	GB	Qualification
1	Talk 'N Text Tropang Texters	12	2	.857	—	Twice-to-beat in the quarterfinals
2	San Mig Coffee Mixers	10	4	.714	2	Twice-to-beat in the quarterfinals
3	Rain or Shine Elasto Painters	9	5	.643	3	Best-of-three quarterfinals
4	Meralco Bolts	8	6	.571 (Note: Head-to-head record: Alaska 1–1 Meralco (Meralco +4))	4	Best-of-three quarterfinals
5	Alaska Aces	8	6	.571	4	Best-of-three quarterfinals
6	Barangay Ginebra San Miguel	7	7	.500	5	Best-of-three quarterfinals
7	Petron Blaze Boosters	6	8	.429	6	Twice-to-win in the quarterfinals
8	Air21 Express	5	9	.357	7	Twice-to-win in the quarterfinals
9	Barako Bull Energy Cola	4	10	.286	8	
10	GlobalPort Batang Pier	1	13	.071	11	

Source: PBA.ph

==== Game log ====
2012–13 PBA Philippine Cup game log
October

Game	Date	Opponent	Score	High points	High rebounds	High assists	Location Attendance	Record	
1	September 30	GlobalPort	110–90	Caguioa (18)	Mamaril (12)	Tenorio (10)	Smart Araneta Coliseum	1–0	Boxscore
2	October 7	Rain or Shine	98–94	Caguioa (22)	Caguioa, Maierhofer, Mamaril, Hatfield (8)	Caguioa, Hatfield (3)	Smart Araneta Coliseum	2–0	Boxscore
3	October 13	Meralco	88–95	Caguioa, Ellis (19)	Maierhofer (17)	Tenorio (5)	Digos	2–1	Boxscore
4	October 19	Barako Bull	82–92	Caguioa (21)	Mamaril (8)	Tenorio (6)	Smart Araneta Coliseum	2–2	Boxscore
5	October 21	Petron Blaze	95–98	Caguioa (23)	Raymundo (10)	Tenorio (7)	Mall of Asia Arena	2–3	Boxscore
6	October 28	Alaska	69–87	Ababou (14)	Maierhofer (8)	Maierhofer (4)	Smart Araneta Coliseum	2–4	Boxscore

November

Game	Date	Opponent	Score	High points	High rebounds	High assists	Location Attendance	Record	
7	November 4	San Mig Coffee	68–78	Caguioa (18)	Mamaril (8)	Tenorio, Mamaril (4)	Smart Araneta Coliseum	2–5	Boxscore
8	November 9	GlobalPort	81–79	Caguioa (19)	Mamaril, Wilson, Espiritu (7)	Helterbrand (6)	Cuneta Astrodome	3–5	Boxscore
9	November 11	Talk 'N Text	104–101	Caguioa (22)	Hatfield (13)	Hatfield (4)	Mall of Asia Arena	4–5	Boxscore
10	November 18	Alaska	96–93	Caguioa (24)	Mamaril (12)	Caguioa, Ellis, Tenorio, Hatfield (4)	Smart Araneta Coliseum	5–5	Boxscore
11	November 25	Rain or Shine	97–90	Tenorio (20)	Mamaril (9)	Tenorio (10)	Smart Araneta Coliseum	6–5	Boxscore
12	November 30	Air21	99–76	Ellis (18)	Hatfield (12)	Tenorio (7)	Smart Araneta Coliseum	7–5	Boxscore

December

Game	Date	Opponent	Score	High points	High rebounds	High assists	Location Attendance	Record	
13	December 2	Barako Bull	79–83	Helterbrand (18)	Maierhofer (14)	Helterbrand (6)	Smart Araneta Coliseum	7–6	Boxscore
14	December 9	Talk 'N Text	80–87	Caguioa (20)	Maierhofer, Hatfield (9)	Caguioa (6)	Smart Araneta Coliseum	7–7	Boxscore

2012–13 schedule

=== Playoffs ===
==== Bracket ====
Quarterfinals
(#1 twice-to-beat)
1	Talk 'N Text	105
8	Air21	100
(Best-of-3)
4	Meralco	0
5	Alaska	2
(#2 twice-to-beat)
2	San Mig Coffee	92*
7	Petron Blaze	87
(Best-of-3)
3	Rain or Shine	2
6	Barangay Ginebra	1

Semifinals (Best-of-7)
1	Talk 'N Text	4
5	Alaska	2
2	San Mig Coffee	2
3	Rain or Shine	4

Finals (Best-of-7)
1	Talk 'N Text	4
3	Rain or Shine	0

*Game went into overtime

==== Game log ====
2012–13 PBA Philippine Cup playoffs game log
Quarterfinals: 1–2

Game	Date	Opponent	Score	High points	High rebounds	High assists	Location Attendance	Series	
1	December 12	Rain or Shine	65–82	Caguioa (16)	Maierhofer (11)	Helterbrand (4)	Smart Araneta Coliseum	0–1	Boxscores
2	December 14	Rain or Shine	79–77	Ellis (18)	Ellis (10)	Caguioa, Tenorio (4)	Smart Araneta Coliseum	1–1	Boxscores
3	December 16	Rain or Shine	89–102	Tenorio, Mamaril (20)	Maierhofer (12)	Helterbrand (6)	Smart Araneta Coliseum	1–2	Boxscore

2012–13 schedule

== Commissioner's Cup ==
=== Eliminations ===
==== Standings ====
Pos	Team	W	L	PCT	GB	Qualification
1	Alaska Aces	11	3	.786	—	Twice-to-beat in the quarterfinals
2	Rain or Shine Elasto Painters	9	5	.643	2	Twice-to-beat in the quarterfinals
3	Petron Blaze Boosters	8	6	.571 (Note: Head-to-head record: Petron 2–0 San Mig)	3	Best-of-three quarterfinals
4	San Mig Coffee Mixers	8	6	.571	3	Best-of-three quarterfinals
5	Meralco Bolts	7	7	.500 (Note: Head-to-head quotient: Meralco 1.01, TNT 1.00, Barangay Ginebra 0.99)	4	Best-of-three quarterfinals
6	Talk 'N Text Tropang Texters	7	7	.500	4	Best-of-three quarterfinals
7	Barangay Ginebra San Miguel	7	7	.500	4	Twice-to-win in the quarterfinals
8	Air21 Express	6	8	.429	5	Twice-to-win in the quarterfinals
9	Barako Bull Energy Cola	5	9	.357	6	
10	GlobalPort Batang Pier	2	12	.143	9	

Source: PBA.ph

==== Game log ====
2013 PBA Commissioner's Cup game log
February

Game	Date	Opponent	Score	High points	High rebounds	High assists	Location Attendance	Record	
1	February 10	Air21	70–74	Caguioa (26)	Hill (18)	Helterbrand (4)	Smart Araneta Coliseum	0–1	boxscore
2	February 15	GlobalPort	80–89	Hill (22)	Hill (19)	Tenorio (5)	Smart Araneta Coliseum	0–2	boxscore
3	February 17	Petron Blaze	90–105	Caguioa (24)	Hill (11)	Caguioa (6)	Smart Araneta Coliseum	0–3	boxscore
4	February 23	Alaska	69–84	Caguioa (20)	Macklin (20)	Macklin (4)	Tubod, Lanao del Norte	0–4	boxscore
5	February 27	Barako Bull	93–72	Caguioa (23)	Macklin (14)	Tenorio (6)	Smart Araneta Coliseum	1–4	boxscore

March

Game	Date	Opponent	Score	High points	High rebounds	High assists	Location Attendance	Record	
6	March 3	Rain or Shine	93–96	Macklin (27)	Macklin (16)	Tenorio (10)	Smart Araneta Coliseum	1–5	boxscore
7	March 10	San Mig Coffee	96–88				Smart Araneta Coliseum	2–5	
8	March 17	Talk 'N Text					Smart Araneta Coliseum		
9	March 22	Meralco					Smart Araneta Coliseum		

2012–13 schedule

== Governors' Cup ==
=== Eliminations ===
==== Standings ====
Pos	Team	W	L	PCT	GB	Qualification
1	Petron Blaze Boosters	8	1	.889	—	Twice-to-beat in the quarterfinals
2	San Mig Coffee Mixers	6	3	.667	2	Twice-to-beat in the quarterfinals
3	Meralco Bolts	5	4	.556 (Note: Head-to-head record: Meralco 1–0 Rain or Shine)	3	Twice-to-beat in the quarterfinals
4	Rain or Shine Elasto Painters	5	4	.556	3	Twice-to-beat in the quarterfinals
5	GlobalPort Batang Pier	4	5	.444 (Note: Head-to-head quotient: GlobalPort 1.01, Barako Bull 1.00, Alaska 0.99)	4	Twice-to-win in the quarterfinals
6	Barako Bull Energy	4	5	.444	4	Twice-to-win in the quarterfinals
7	Alaska Aces	4	5	.444	4	Twice-to-win in the quarterfinals
8	Barangay Ginebra San Miguel	3	6	.333 (Note: Head-to-head quotient: Talk 'N Text 1.05, Barangay Ginebra 1.00, Air21 0.96; eighth seed playoff: Barangay Ginebra 110–102 Talk 'N Text)	5	Twice-to-win in the quarterfinals
9	Talk 'N Text Tropang Texters	3	6	.333	5	
10	Air21 Express	3	6	.333	5	

Source: PBA.ph

== Transactions ==
=== Trades ===
==== Pre-season ====
August 23, 2012	To Barangay Ginebra Elmer Espiritu (from Air21); 2013 first round pick (from Air21)	To Air21 Nonoy Baclao (from Petron Blaze); Robert Reyes (from Petron Blaze); KG Canaleta (from Barangay Ginebra); John Wilson (from Barangay Ginebra)	To Petron Blaze Magi Sison (from Air21); Paolo Hubalde (from Air21); 2014 second round pick (from Air21)

August 31, 2012	To Barangay Ginebra Willie Miller	To Barako Bull Enrico Villanueva

August 31, 2012	To Barangay Ginebra JV Casio	To GlobalPort Willie Miller; 2014 1st round pick

August 31, 2012	To Barangay Ginebra L.A. Tenorio	To Alaska JV Casio; 2015 2nd round pick

==== Philippine Cup ====
November 7, 2012	To Barangay Ginebra Yousef Taha	To Air21 Mike Cortez

==== Commissioner's Cup ====
January 22, 2013	To Barangay Ginebra Mac Baracael	To Barako Bull Allein Maliksi

April 18	To Barangay Ginebra Josh Urbiztondo	To Barako Bull Keith Jensen; 2015 2nd round pick (from GlobalPort)

June 10, 2013	To Barangay Ginebra 2013 2nd round pick (from Talk 'N Text)	To Barako Bull Elmer Espiritu

June 10, 2013	To Barangay Ginebra Japeth Aguilar	To GlobalPort 2013 1st round pick (from Barangay Ginebra via Talk 'N Text and Barako Bull); Yousef Taha

=== Recruited imports ===
Tournament	Name	Debuted	Last game	Record
Commissioner's Cup	Herbert Hill	February 10 (vs. Air21)	February 17 (vs. Petron)	0–3
Commissioner's Cup	Vernon Macklin	February 24 (vs. Alaska)	May 19 (vs. Alaska)	12–9
Governors' Cup	Dior Lowhorn	August 18 (vs. Petron)	September 26 (vs. Petron)	4–7
