= 2002 PBA draft =

Player selection in Philippine basketball

General information
- Date(s): January 13, 2002
- Time: 3:00 pm
- Location: Glorietta Activity Center, Makati
- Network(s): Viva TV on IBC

Overview
- League: Philippine Basketball Association
- First selection: Yancy de Ocampo (FedEx Express)

The 2002 Philippine Basketball Association (PBA) rookie draft was an event at which teams drafted players from the amateur ranks. It was held on January 13, 2002, at the Glorietta Activity Center in Makati City.

== Round 1 ==
*	Mythical team member	^{#}	All-star

Pick	Player	Country of origin*	PBA team	College
1	Yancy de Ocampo*	Philippines	FedEx Express	St. Francis
2	Rafi Reavis^{#}	United States	Coca-Cola Tigers	Coppin State
3	Omanzie Rodriguez	Philippines	Sta. Lucia Realtors	Mapua
4	Chris Calaguio^{#}	Philippines	Shell Turbo Chargers	Letran
5	Homer Se	Philippines	Red Bull Thunder	San Sebastian
6	Miguel Noble	United States	Alaska Aces	Utica
7	Eric Canlas	Philippines	Shell Turbo Chargers	St. Francis
8	Renren Ritualo^{#}	Philippines	FedEx Express	La Salle-Manila
9	Chester Tolomia	Philippines	Barangay Ginebra Kings	Perpetual Help
10	Leo Avenido	Philippines	Coca-Cola Tigers	Far Eastern

== Round 2 ==
Pick	Player	Country of origin*	PBA team	College
11	Gilbert Lao	Philippines	Coca-Cola Tigers	Santo Tomas
12	Christian Nicdao	Philippines	Talk 'N Text Phone Pals	Far Eastern
13	Chito Victolero	Philippines	Sta. Lucia Realtors	Mapua
14	Reinier Sison	Philippines	Shell Turbo Chargers	Ateneo de Manila
15	Edwin Bacani	Philippines	Shell Turbo Chargers	Far Eastern
16	Gilbert Malabanan	Philippines	Barangay Ginebra Kings	Perpetual Help
17	Jojo Manalo	Philippines	Coca-Cola Tigers	Perpetual Help
18	Alvin Castro	Philippines	San Miguel Beermen	La Salle-Manila

== Round 3 ==
Pick	Player	Country of origin*	PBA team	College
19	Celino Cruz	Philippines	Talk 'N Text Phone Pals	Far Eastern
20	Junel Mendiola	Philippines	Purefoods Tender Juicy Hotdogs	PSBA
21	Brandon Sison	Philippines	Sta. Lucia Realtors	Ateneo de Manila
22	Dexter Racho	Philippines	Purefoods Tender Juicy Hotdogs	UP Diliman
23	Willie Mejia	Philippines	Red Bull Thunder	Angeles University Foundation
24	Rensy Bajar	Philippines	Shell Turbo Chargers	San Beda
25	Jason Misolas	Philippines	Coca-Cola Tigers	Letran
26	Aries Dimaunahan	Philippines	Barangay Ginebra Kings	Santo Tomas

== Round 4 ==
Pick	Player	Country of origin*	PBA team	College
27	John Victorio	Philippines	FedEx Express	UNLV
28	Danilo Capobres	Philippines	Talk 'N Text Phone Pals	Lyceum
29	Richard de la Peña	Philippines	Shell Turbo Chargers	
30	Billy Moody	Philippines	Purefoods Tender Juicy Hotdogs	Letran
31	Arnel Mañalac	Philippines	Red Bull Thunder	Perpetual Help
32	Richard Melencio	Philippines	Shell Turbo Chargers	Santo Tomas

== Round 5 ==
Pick	Player	Country of origin*	PBA team	College
33	Francis Sanz	Philippines	Talk 'N Text Phone Pals	PCCR
34	Jerome Barbosa	Philippines	FedEx Express	San Sebastian
35	Eugene Tan	Philippines	Purefoods Tender Juicy Hotdogs	Manila
36	Kenneth Gumpenberger	Philippines	Red Bull Thunder	Cal State San Bernardino
37	Edrick Ferrer	Philippines	FedEx Express	UP Diliman

== Round 6 ==
Pick	Player	Country of origin*	PBA team	College
38	Francis Aquino	Philippines	FedEx Express	
39	Jacques Gottenbos	Philippines	Talk 'N Text Phone Pals	San Beda

== Round 7 ==
Pick	Player	Country of origin*	PBA team	College
40	Paolo Malonzo	Philippines	FedEx Express	New Era

== Note ==
*All players are Filipinos until proven otherwise.
