= 2010 PBA Fiesta Conference =

Philippine basketball tournament

- Duration: March 21 – August 18, 2010
- TV partner(s): Solar TV, Basketball TV (Local); The Filipino Channel (International)

Finals
- Champions: Alaska Aces
- Runners-up: San Miguel Beermen

Awards
- Best Player: Jay Washington (San Miguel Beermen)
- Best Import: Gabe Freeman (San Miguel Beermen)
- Finals MVP: Cyrus Baguio and LA Tenorio (Alaska Aces)

PBA Fiesta Conference chronology
- < 2009

PBA conference chronology
- < 2009–10 Philippine 2010–11 Philippine >

The 2010 Philippine Basketball Association (PBA) Fiesta Conference was the last conference of the 2009–10 PBA season. It started on March 21 and finished on August 18, 2010. The tournament is an import-laden format, which requires an import or a pure-foreign player for each team and with a height limit of 6-foot-6 (same with the previous Fiesta Conferences except 2008 which had imports of unlimited heights, and of 2007 where the two worst teams in the Philippine Cup had an extra import of 6-foot-1 height limit).

== Format ==
The following format will be observed for the duration of the conference:

- Double round-robin eliminations; 18 games per team; Teams are then seeded by basis on win–loss records. Ties are broken among points differences of the tied teams.
- Teams seeded #6, #7, #8 and #9 play in a knockout wildcard playoffs for the final berth in the quarterfinals. Matchups are:
  - #6 team vs. #9 team
  - #7 team vs. #8 team
  - Winners of the first round for the last quarterfinal berth.
- #3, #4 and #5 teams automatically advance to the best of five quarterfinals:
  - #3 team vs. winner of wildcard playoffs
  - #4 vs. #5 teams
- #1 and #2 teams automatically advance to the best of seven semifinals:
  - Winner of first quarterfinal vs. #1
  - Winner of second quarterfinal vs. #2
- The winners in the semifinals advance to the best of seven finals. The losers dispute the third-place trophy in a one-game playoff.

== Elimination round ==
=== Team standings ===
Pos	Team	W	L	PCT	GB	Qualification
1	Talk 'N Text Tropang Texters	15	3	.833	—	Advance to semifinals
2	San Miguel Beermen	13	5	.722 (Note: Second seed playoff: San Miguel 88, Derby Ace 83)	2	Advance to semifinals
3	Derby Ace Llamados	13	5	.722	2	Advance to quarterfinals
4	Alaska Aces	11	7	.611	4	Advance to quarterfinals
5	Barangay Ginebra Kings	9	9	.500 (Note: Fifth seed playoff: Barangay Ginebra 115, Rain or Shine 88)	6	Advance to quarterfinals
6	Rain or Shine Elasto Painters	9	9	.500	6	Advance to wildcard round
7	Coca-Cola Tigers	8	10	.444	7	Advance to wildcard round
8	Sta. Lucia Realtors	5	13	.278	10	Advance to wildcard round
9	Air21 Express	4	14	.222	11	Advance to wildcard round
10	Barako Energy Coffee Masters	3	15	.167	12	

Source: PBA.ph

=== Schedule ===
	Round 1									Round 2								
Team ╲ Game	1	2	3	4	5	6	7	8	9	10	11	12	13	14	15	16	17	18
Air21	SMB	BCM	Coke	DAL	ALA	SLR	TNT	BGK	ROS	DAL	SMB	BCM	TNT	Coke	ALA	SLR	BGK	ROS
Alaska	TNT	SMB	A21	DAL	BGK	BCM	Coke	SLR	ROS	Coke	BGK	DAL	BCM	TNT	A21	ROS	SLR	SMB
Barako	SLR	Coke	A21	ROS	SMB	TNT	DAL	ALA	BGK	SMB	ROS	A21	Coke	ALA	BGK	SLR	TNT	DAL
Barangay Ginebra	TNT	SLR	Coke	ROS	SMB	ALA	A21	DAL	BCM	SLR	ALA	SMB	ROS	TNT	BCM	Coke	A21	DAL
B-Meg Derby Ace	SLR	A21	Coke	ALA	BCM	SMB	ROS	BGK	A21	TNT	Coke	ALA	SLR	SMB	ROS	TNT	BGK	BCM
Coca-Cola	BCM	SMB	A21	BGK	DAL	ROS	TNT	SLR	ALA	TNT	ALA	DAL	BCM	A21	BGK	SMB	SLR	ROS
Rain or Shine	TNT	SLR	BCM	BGK	Coke	SMB	DAL	A21	ALA	BCM	BGK	TNT	SLR	DAL	ALA	SMB	A21	Coke
Sta. Lucia	BCM	BGK	ROS	DAL	TNT	A21	Coke	SMB	ALA	BGK	TNT	SMB	DAL	ROS	BCM	A21	ALA	Coke
San Miguel	A21	Coke	TNT	BCM	ALA	BGK	ROS	DAL	SLR	BCM	A21	BGK	SLR	DAL	TNT	Coke	ROS	ALA
Talk 'N Text	BGK	ROS	SMB	ALA	SLR	BCM	Coke	A21	Coke	DAL	SLR	A21	ROS	BGK	ALA	SMB	DAL	BCM

= Win; = OT win; = Loss; = OT loss

== Second seed playoff ==
Solar TV

July 2

San Miguel Beermen 88, Derby Ace Llamados 83

Ninoy Aquino Stadium, Manila

== Fifth seed playoff ==
Solar TV

July 2

Barangay Ginebra Kings 115, Rain or Shine Elasto Painters 88

Ninoy Aquino Stadium, Manila

== Bracket ==
Wildcard phase (Single elimination)
6	Rain or Shine	92
9	Air21	89
7	Coca-Cola	100
8	Sta. Lucia	84

Wildcard phase (Single elimination)
6	Rain or Shine	98
7	Coca-Cola	93

Quarterfinals (Best-of-5)
3	Derby Ace	3
6	Rain or Shine	2
4	Alaska	3
5	Brgy. Ginebra	2

Semifinals (Best-of-7)
2	San Miguel	4
3	Derby Ace	3
1	Talk 'N Text	3
4	Alaska	4

Finals (Best-of-7)
2	San Miguel	2
4	Alaska	4
Third place
3	Derby Ace	95
1	Talk 'N Text	113

== Wildcard phase ==
=== First round ===
Solar TV

July 4

Coca Cola Tigers 100, Sta. Lucia Realtors 84

Araneta Coliseum, Quezon City

Solar TV

July 4

Rain or Shine Elasto Painters 92, Air21 Express 89

Araneta Coliseum, Quezon City

=== Second round ===
Solar TV

July 7

Rain or Shine Elasto Painters 98, Coca Cola Tigers 93

Araneta Coliseum, Quezon City

== Quarterfinals ==
=== (3) Derby Ace vs. (6) Rain or Shine ===
Solar TV

July 9

Derby Ace Llamados 108, Rain or Shine Elasto Painters 102

Araneta Coliseum, Quezon City

Solar TV

July 11

Derby Ace Llamados 69, Rain or Shine Elasto Painters 79

Cuneta Astrodome, Pasay

Solar TV

July 14

Derby Ace Llamados 111, Rain or Shine Elasto Painters 117 (OT)

Araneta Coliseum, Quezon City

Solar TV

July 16

Derby Ace Llamados 92, Rain or Shine Elasto Painters 78

Cuneta Astrodome, Pasay

Solar TV

July 18

Derby Ace Llamados 105, Rain or Shine Elasto Painters 100 (OT)
Derby Ace wins series, 3–2

Araneta Coliseum, Quezon City
Attendance: 21,062

=== (4) Alaska vs. (5) Barangay Ginebra ===
Solar TV

July 9

Alaska Aces 76, Barangay Ginebra Kings 72

Araneta Coliseum, Quezon City

Solar TV

July 11

Alaska Aces 84, Barangay Ginebra Kings 82

Cuneta Astrodome, Pasay

Solar TV

July 14

Alaska Aces 87, Barangay Ginebra Kings 91

Araneta Coliseum, Quezon City

Solar TV

July 16

Alaska Aces 90, Barangay Ginebra Kings 94

Cuneta Astrodome, Pasay

Solar TV

July 18

Alaska Aces 93, Barangay Ginebra Kings 91
Alaska wins series, 3–2

Araneta Coliseum, Quezon City
Attendance: 21,062

== Semifinals ==
=== (1) Talk 'N Text vs. (4) Alaska ===
Solar TV

July 21

Talk 'N Text Tropang Texters 88, Alaska Aces 104

Araneta Coliseum, Quezon City

Solar TV

July 23

Talk 'N Text Tropang Texters 100, Alaska Aces 94

Araneta Coliseum, Quezon City

Solar TV

July 25

Talk 'N Text Tropang Texters 86, Alaska Aces 90

Araneta Coliseum, Quezon City

Solar TV

July 28

Talk 'N Text Tropang Texters 83, Alaska Aces 62

Cuneta Astrodome, Pasay

Solar TV

July 30

Talk 'N Text Tropang Texters 82, Alaska Aces 81

Araneta Coliseum, Quezon City

Solar TV

August 1

Talk 'N Text Tropang Texters 83, Alaska Aces 94

Araneta Coliseum, Quezon City

Solar TV

August 4

Talk 'N Text Tropang Texters 81, Alaska Aces 90
Alaska wins series, 4–3

Araneta Coliseum, Quezon City

=== (2) San Miguel vs. (3) Derby Ace ===
Solar TV

July 21

San Miguel Beermen 101, Derby Ace Llamados 88

Araneta Coliseum, Quezon City

Solar TV

July 23

San Miguel Beermen 94, Derby Ace Llamados 95

Araneta Coliseum, Quezon City

Solar TV

July 25

San Miguel Beermen 74, Derby Ace Llamados 70

Araneta Coliseum, Quezon City

Solar TV

July 28

San Miguel Beermen 83, Derby Ace Llamados 75

Cuneta Astrodome, Pasay

Solar TV

July 30

San Miguel Beermen 82, Derby Ace Llamados 88

Araneta Coliseum, Quezon City

Solar TV

August 1

San Miguel Beermen 91, Derby Ace Llamados 83
San Miguel wins series, 4–2

Araneta Coliseum, Quezon City

== Third place playoff ==
Solar TV

August 6

Talk 'N Text Tropang Texters 113, Derby Ace Llamados 95

Araneta Coliseum, Quezon City

== Finals ==
Solar TV

August 6

San Miguel Beermen 83, Alaska Aces 89

Araneta Coliseum, Quezon City

Solar TV

August 8

San Miguel Beermen 90, Alaska Aces 94

Araneta Coliseum, Quezon City

Solar TV

August 11

San Miguel Beermen 96, Alaska Aces 86

Araneta Coliseum, Quezon City

Solar TV

August 13

San Miguel Beermen 83, Alaska Aces 90

Cuneta Astrodome, Pasay

Solar TV

August 15

San Miguel Beermen 96, Alaska Aces 94

Araneta Coliseum, Quezon City

Solar TV

August 18

San Miguel Beermen 88, Alaska Aces 102
Alaska wins series, 4–2

Araneta Coliseum, Quezon City

== Imports ==
Team	Player	Debuted	Final
Air21 Express	Keena Young (1/4)	March 24, 2010	April 9, 2010
Air21 Express	Jason Forte (2/4)	April 14, 2010	April 18, 2010
Air21 Express	Reggie Larry (3/4)	May 1, 2010	May 28, 2010
Air21 Express	Leroy Hickerson (4/4)	June 4, 2010	July 4, 2010
Alaska Aces	Diamon Simpson (1/1)	April 7, 2010	August 18, 2010
Barako Energy Coffee Masters	Sammy Monroe (1/1)	March 21, 2010	June 27, 2010
Brgy. Ginebra Kings	Awvee Story (1/4)	March 21, 2010	April 18, 2010
Brgy. Ginebra Kings	Mildon Ambres (2/4)	April 30, 2010	May 30, 2010
Brgy. Ginebra Kings	Denham Brown (3/4)	June 5, 2010	June 23, 2010
Brgy. Ginebra Kings	Chris Daniels (4/4)	July 2, 2010	July 18, 2010
Coca-Cola Tigers	James Penny (1/3)	March 24, 2010	May 7, 2010
Coca-Cola Tigers	Rashad Bell (2/3)	May 14, 2010	June 4, 2010
Coca-Cola Tigers	John Williamson (3/3)	June 13, 2010	July 4, 2010
Derby Ace Llamados	Lorrenzo Wade (1/3)	April 7, 2010	April 21, 2010
Derby Ace Llamados	Cliff Brown (2/3)	May 2, 2010	July 14, 2010
Derby Ace Llamados	Tony Washam (3/3)	July 16, 2010	August 1, 2010
Rain or Shine Elasto Painters	Jai Lewis (1/2)	March 26, 2010	June 18, 2010
Rain or Shine Elasto Painters	Rod Nealy (2/2)	June 25, 2010	July 18, 2010
San Miguel Beermen	Gabriel Freeman (1/1)	March 24, 2010	August 18, 2010
Sta. Lucia Realtors	Anthony Johnson (1/1)	March 21, 2010	July 4, 2010
Talk 'N Text Tropang Texters	Shawn Daniels (1/1)	March 21, 2010	August 6, 2010

== Conference records ==
Records marked with an asterisk (*) were accomplished with one or more overtime periods.

=== Team ===
Record	Stat	Holder	Date/s
Longest winning streak	13	Talk 'N Text Tropang Texters	April 7, 2010 - June 19, 2010
Longest losing streak	9	Air21 Express	March 31, 2010 - May 21, 2010
Biggest winning margin	26	Talk 'N Text Tropang Texters 126, Air21 Express 100	May 28, 2010

=== Individual ===
Record	Stat	Holder	Date/s
Most points in one game	45	Solomon Mercado (Rain or Shine Elasto Painters) vs. Derby Ace Llamados	June 11, 2010
Most rebounds in one game	17	Asi Taulava (Coca-Cola Tigers) vs. Air21 Express	June 4, 2010
Most assists in one game	14	Jimmy Alapag (Talk 'N Text Tropang Texters) vs. Air21 Express	May 1, 2010
Most blocks in one game	4	Rafi Reavis (Derby Ace Llamados) vs. Coca-Cola Tigers	April 14, 2010
Most blocks in one game	4	Niño Canaleta (Derby Ace Llamados) vs. Barako Energy Coffee Masters	April 21, 2010
Most steals in one game	5	Roger Yap (Derby Ace Llamados) vs. Alaska Aces	May 28, 2010
Most steals in one game	5	Ryan Reyes (Talk 'N Text Tropang Texters) vs. Brgy. Ginebra Kings	March 26, 2010
Most steals in one game	5	Joshua Urbiztondo (Sta. Lucia Realtors) vs. Talk 'N Text Tropang Texters	March 23, 2010
Most FG made in one game	14	Solomon Mercado (Rain or Shine Elasto Painters) vs. Derby Ace Llamados	June 11, 2010
Most 3 point FG made in one game	7	Solomon Mercado (Rain or Shine Elasto Painters) vs Derby Ace Llamados	June 11, 2010
Most 3 point FG made in one game	7	Jimmy Alapag (Talk 'N Text Tropang Texters) vs. Coca-Cola Tigers	April 21, 2010
Most FT made in one game	11	Gary David (Coca-Cola Tigers) vs Derby Ace Llamados	March 23, 2010
Most minutes played in one game	52*	Kelly Williams (Talk 'N Text Tropang Texters) vs. Air21 Express	April 18, 2010

== Awards ==
- Best Player of the Conference: Jay Washington (San Miguel)
- Best Import: Gabe Freeman (San Miguel)
- Finals MVPs: Cyrus Baguio and LA Tenorio (Alaska)

=== Players of the Week ===
Week	Player	Ref.
Mar. 21 - Mar. 28	Gary David (Coca-Cola Tigers)	
Mar. 29 - Apr. 4	Gabe Norwood (Rain or Shine Elasto Painters)	
Apr. 5 - Apr. 11	Mark Cardona (Talk 'N Text Tropang Texters)	
Apr. 12 - Apr. 18	Willie Miller (Alaska Aces)	
Apr. 26 - May 2	Jay Washington (San Miguel Beermen)	
May 3 - May 9	James Yap (Derby Ace Llamados)	
May 10 - May 16	Eric Menk (Barangay Ginebra Kings)	
May 17 - May 23	Kelly Williams (Talk 'N Text Tropang Texters)	
May 17 - May 23	Jimmy Alapag (Talk 'N Text Tropang Texters)	
May 24 - May 30	L.A. Tenorio (Alaska Aces)	
May 31 - June 6	James Yap (Derby Ace Llamados)	
June 7 - June 13	Jimmy Alapag (Talk 'N Text Tropang Texters)	
June 14 - June 20	L.A. Tenorio (Alaska Aces)	
June 14 - June 20	Cyrus Baguio (Alaska Aces)	
June 21 - June 27	James Yap (Derby Ace Llamados)	
June 21 - June 27	Solomon Mercado (Rain or Shine Elasto Painters)	
June 28 - July 4	Gary David (Coca-Cola Tigers)	
July 5 - July 11	Joe Devance (Alaska Aces)	
July 12 - July 18	Roger Yap (Derby Ace Llamados)	
July 12 - July 18	Cyrus Baguio (Alaska Aces)	
July 19 - July 25	L.A. Tenorio (Alaska Aces)	
July 26 - Aug. 1	Jay Washington (San Miguel Beermen)	
July 26 - Aug. 1	Arwind Santos (San Miguel Beermen)	

== Statistics leaders ==
Category	Player	Team	Games played	Totals	Average
Points per game	Gary David	Coca-Cola Tigers	20	430	21.5
Rebounds per game	Asi Taulava	Coca-Cola Tigers	20	218	10.9
Assists per game	Jimmy Alapag	Talk 'N Text Tropang Texters	18	132	7.3
Steals per game	Gabe Norwood	Rain or Shine Elasto Painters	23	32	1.4
Blocks per game	Rob Reyes	Barako Energy Coffee Masters	16	16	1.0
Field goal percentage	Harvey Carey	Talk 'N Text Tropang Texters	18	81-148	.547
3-point field goal percentage	Dondon Hontiveros	San Miguel Beermen	18	40-90	.444
Free throw percentage	L.A. Tenorio	Alaska Aces	20	36-39	.923

== See also ==
- 2009-10 PBA season
