= Cyrus Baguio =

Filipino basketball player (born 1980)

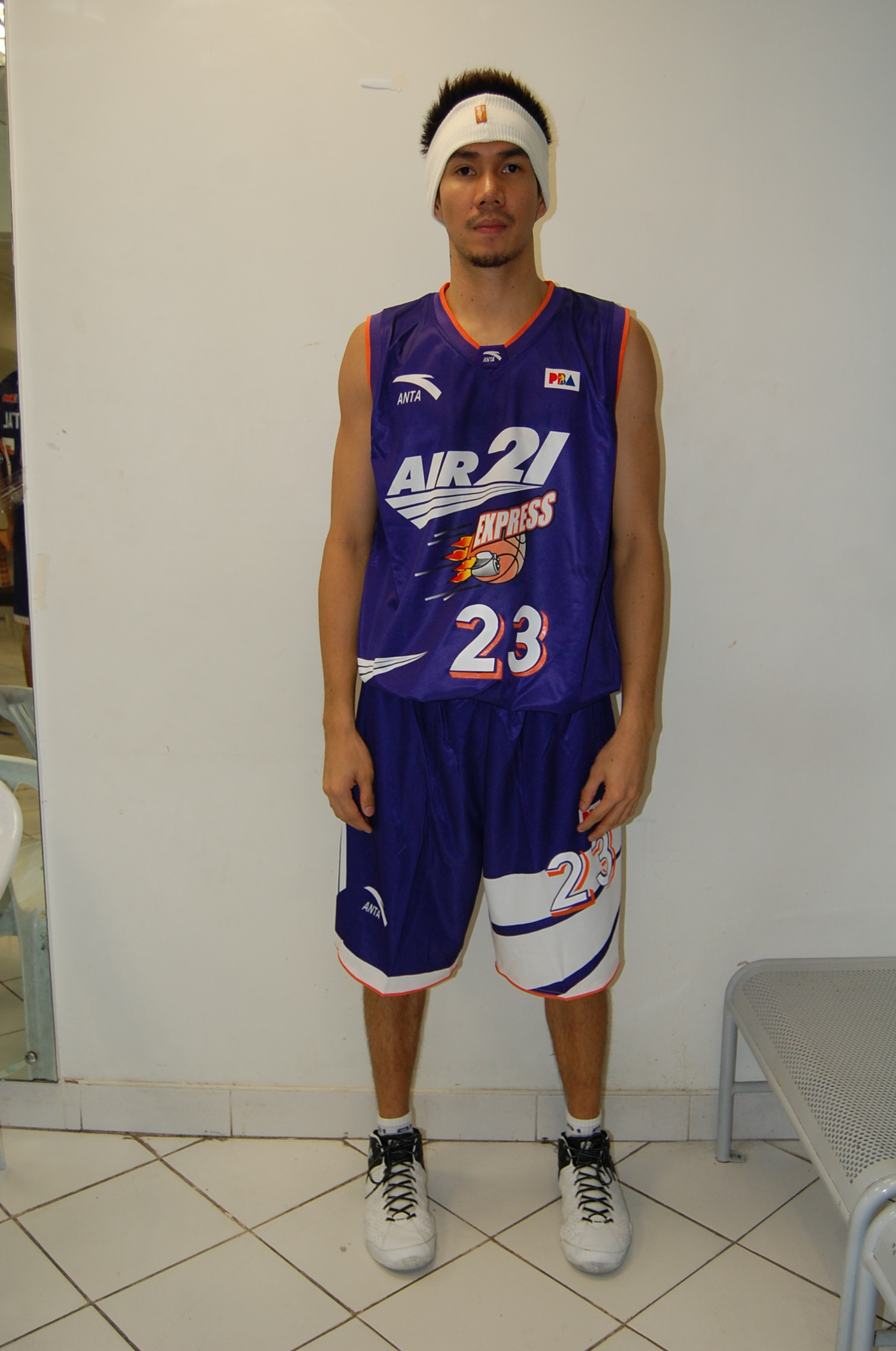
- Baguio in 2008

Free agent
- Position: Shooting guard / small forward

Personal information
- Born: August 19, 1980 (age 46) Iligan City, Philippines
- Listed height: 6 ft 2 in (1.88 m)
- Listed weight: 180 lb (82 kg)

Career information
- High school: SWU (Cebu City)
- College: UST
- PBA draft: 2003: 2nd round, 14th overall pick
- Drafted by: Red Bull Barako
- Playing career: 2003–2019, 2022–2024

Career history
- 2003–2008: Red Bull Barako
- 2008–2009: Air21 Express / Burger King Whoppers
- 2009–2010: Barangay Ginebra Kings
- 2010–2016: Alaska Aces
- 2016–2017: Phoenix Fuel Masters
- 2017–2019: NLEX Road Warriors
- 2022–2024: Valenzuela XUR Homes Realty Inc./Classic

Career highlights
- 3× PBA champion (2005–06 Fiesta, 2010 Fiesta, 2013 Commissioner's); PBA Finals Most Valuable Player (2010 Fiesta co-MVP w/ LA Tenorio); PBA Most Improved Player (2008); PBA Sportsmanship Award (2010); 11× PBA All-Star (2005–2011, 2013, 2015, 2017, 2018); 2× PBA Mythical Second Team (2008, 2013); PBA Slam Dunk champion (2004); UAAP Mythical Team (2002)

Cyrus Marata Baguio (born August 19, 1980) is a Filipino professional basketball player who last played for the Valenzuela Classic of the Maharlika Pilipinas Basketball League (MPBL). He also formerly played in the Philippine Basketball Association (PBA) for 16 seasons before initially retiring, but has since came back from retirement to play in the MPBL. He is known for his dunks and acrobatic moves, thus his moniker "Skyrus".

== Amateur and college career ==
Baguio started playing college ball at the University of Santo Tomas by suiting up for the school's basketball varsity squad, the Growling Tigers. When he arrived in Manila from Cebu in the summer of 1999, he initially tried out for La Salle. The Green Archers’ coaching staff was interested in adding him to their lineup with a condition that he would be spending time under Team B for a couple of years before he could move up. He was dismayed, so he decided to look for another school. The moment he tried out for Aric del Rosario, he knew he had found his new home in Manila.

He joined the Tigers three years after UST won four straight UAAP Men's Basketball championships. At the time he arrived, La Salle was the new league power. He was still a freshman when they met the Green Archers in the 1999 UAAP finals where they defeated the Tigers for their second straight title.

Citing academic deficiencies, he decided to sit out the entire 2001 season. Upon his return the following season, he led the Growling Tigers to the 2002 Final Four only to lose to the star-studded La Salle Green Archers squad. Nevertheless, he was selected as part of perhaps the deepest mythical five selection in the history of the UAAP that included University of the East's James Yap, Ateneo's Rich Alvarez and Enrico Villanueva and La Salle superstar Mike Cortez.

He also suited up for Hapee/Kutitap Toothpaste in the PBL.

== Professional career ==
He was drafted 14th overall by Red Bull in the 2003 PBA draft. Before the draft, many basketball pundits were expecting him to be a first round draftee because of his illustrious college career at UST. But during draft day, he was only picked in the second round, causing a shock to many basketball observers.

During his rookie year, he played the support role but did well. Slowly, after Red Bull traded away its main men like Willie Miller, Kerby Raymundo, Lordy Tugade, Enrico Villanueva, and Mick Pennisi, he then emerged as the team's leading scorer and main skipper.

He led his team in scoring and in other departments during his time with Red Bull. And on his last year with the team, he ended his stint still scorching the net by being among the top 10 leading scorers in the league, and by being an All-Star caliber player.

During the latter part of the 2008–09 PBA season, he along with Red Bull teammate Celino Cruz were traded to the Air21 Express for 2011 and 2012 draft picks. This trade then led Yeng Guiao to resign as Red Bull coach.

In 2008, he was named to the National Team under his former mentor in Red Bull, Coach Yeng Guiao.

In 2009, unhappy with his tenure in Burger King, he was dealt to the Barangay Ginebra Kings. He became part of the talented backcourt of the Gin Kings, together with National Teammate Jayjay Helterbrand, Mark Caguioa and Ronald Tubid. He was also reunited with his 2003 batchmates, Enrico Villanueva, Sunday Salvacion, and Tubid.

In the middle of the eliminations of the 2010 Fiesta Conference, Barangay Ginebra shipped Baguio via a blockbuster one-on-one trade to Alaska Aces for two-time MVP Willer Miller. He considered this trade as the best thing that happened to his career. Since he was traded, he helped the Aces win the Fiesta Cup finals and was awarded co-Finals MVP together with LA Tenorio. Three years later, he would win another championship in the 2013 PBA Commissioner's Cup at the expense of his former team, Barangay Ginebra.

On July 31, 2014, he, together with JVee Casio and Sonny Thoss, signed new three-year contracts with the Aces, signalling his intention to remain with the Uytengsu franchise for the rest of his career.

On July 13, 2016, he was traded along with 2017 2nd-round pick to the Phoenix Fuel Masters for 2nd-round picks in 2017 and 2018, respectively.

On August 15, 2017, Phoenix traded him to the NLEX Road Warriors as a part of a three-team trade between the Fuel Masters, Road Warriors, and GlobalPort Batang Pier where he got reunited with Yeng Guiao.

On January 24, 2021, Baguio announced his retirement from professional basketball.

However, in 2022 Baguio came out of retirement to play for Valenzuela XUR Homes Realty Inc. of the Maharlika Pilipinas Basketball League (MPBL). In his first game for the team, he scored 7 points on 3-for-3 shooting in a 87–78 win against Caloocan Excellence.

== PBA career statistics ==
Legend
GP	Games played	MPG	Minutes per game
FG%	Field-goal percentage	3P%	3-point field-goal percentage	FT%	Free-throw percentage
RPG	Rebounds per game	APG	Assists per game	SPG	Steals per game
BPG	Blocks per game	PPG	Points per game	**Bold**	Career high

=== Season-by-season averages ===
Year	Team	GP	MPG	FG%	3P%	FT%	RPG	APG	SPG	BPG	PPG
2003	Red Bull	4	8.5	**.833**	—	—	1.8	1.0	.3	.3	2.5
2004–05	Red Bull	**69**	18.7	.495	.318	.640	2.5	1.5	.6	.5	5.7
2005–06	Red Bull	67	22.3	.440	.302	.651	3.3	2.5	.9	.4	7.7
2006–07	Red Bull	55	24.2	.498	.352	.727	3.3	2.9	.7	.4	11.3
2007–08	Red Bull	48	30.3	.512	.352	.690	3.6	**3.7**	**1.3**	.6	**18.0**
2008–09	Red Bull	48	25.4	.437	.308	.752	2.9	2.3	**1.3**	.6	10.5
2008–09	Burger King	48	25.4	.437	.308	.752	2.9	2.3	**1.3**	.6	10.5
2008–09	Barangay Ginebra	48	25.4	.437	.308	.752	2.9	2.3	**1.3**	.6	10.5
2009–10	Barangay Ginebra	64	29.1	.473	.353	.634	2.6	2.7	1.2	.4	12.4
2009–10	Alaska	64	29.1	.473	.353	.634	2.6	2.7	1.2	.4	12.4
2010–11	Alaska	38	**33.2**	.400	.333	.767	4.3	3.1	1.2	.5	12.4
2011–12	Alaska	35	**33.2**	.441	.386	.744	**4.4**	2.8	1.0	**.7**	14.7
2012–13	Alaska	54	32.6	.435	**.404**	.721	3.8	2.7	1.0	**.7**	13.4
2013–14	Alaska	44	30.4	.418	.327	.746	2.8	2.8	.8	.4	10.4
2014–15	Alaska	57	24.4	.404	.292	.798	2.9	1.9	1.0	.3	9.2
2015–16	Alaska	59	24.6	.406	.302	.733	3.3	2.5	.8	.3	8.8
2015–16	Phoenix	59	24.6	.406	.302	.733	3.3	2.5	.8	.3	8.8
2016–17	Phoenix	36	23.1	.401	.361	.786	2.8	2.6	.8	.3	7.8
2016–17	NLEX	36	23.1	.401	.361	.786	2.8	2.6	.8	.3	7.8
2017–18	NLEX	40	18.3	.462	.361	.763	3.2	2.6	.9	.3	4.9
2019	NLEX	23	10.0	.390	.222	**.857**	1.0	.7	.3	.2	2.5
Career		741	25.4	.446	.338	.715	3.1	2.5	.9	.4	10.1

== Personal life ==
Baguio is the nephew of the late PBA point guard Ric-Ric Marata. On May 28, 2011, he married his former college crush Katie Uy in Antipolo.
