= Saint Francis of Assisi College =

Roman Catholic college in Las Piñas, Philippines

- Kolehiyo ng San Francisco de Assisi (Filipino)
- Educating with Respect, Cultivating an Atmosphere of Understanding
- Former name: Saint Francis of Assisi College System
- Motto: Fides Et Humilitas (Latin)
- Motto in English: Faith And Humility; Tagline: Academics. And beyond.
- Type: Private, Roman Catholic Research Coeducational Basic and Higher education institution
- Established: 1981
- Founders: Dr. Evangeline Oñas-Orosco; Dr. Arturo Agapito Orosco Sr.
- Chairman: Hon. Arturo Agapito Orosco Sr., Ph.D.
- President: Arturo Oñas Orosco Jr., Ph.D.
- Vice-president: Arlen Oñas Orosco, Ph.D.
- Location: Admiral Village, Talon III, Las Piñas, Metro Manila, Philippines; 14°26′38″N 121°00′02″E
- Campus: Main Campus: Las Piñas Satellite campuses; Alabang; Bacoor; Taguig; Dasmariñas; Southwoods; Santa Rosa; SAS Las Piñas; SAS Los Baños
- Alma Mater song: Saint Francis of Assisi College Hymn
- Colors: Red and White
- Nickname: Franciscan
- Sporting affiliations: NCAA-South; UCLAA; LPSAA
- Mascot: SFAC Doves
- Website: www.stfrancis.edu.ph
- Location in Metro Manila Location in Luzon Location in the Philippines

Saint Francis of Assisi College (SFAC) is a system of private, Catholic-oriented but non-sectarian Philippine educational institutions. Named after Saint Francis of Assisi, it offers complete education from pre-school up to the graduate or mistral level of education. The main campus is situated in Las Piñas, Metro Manila.

== History ==
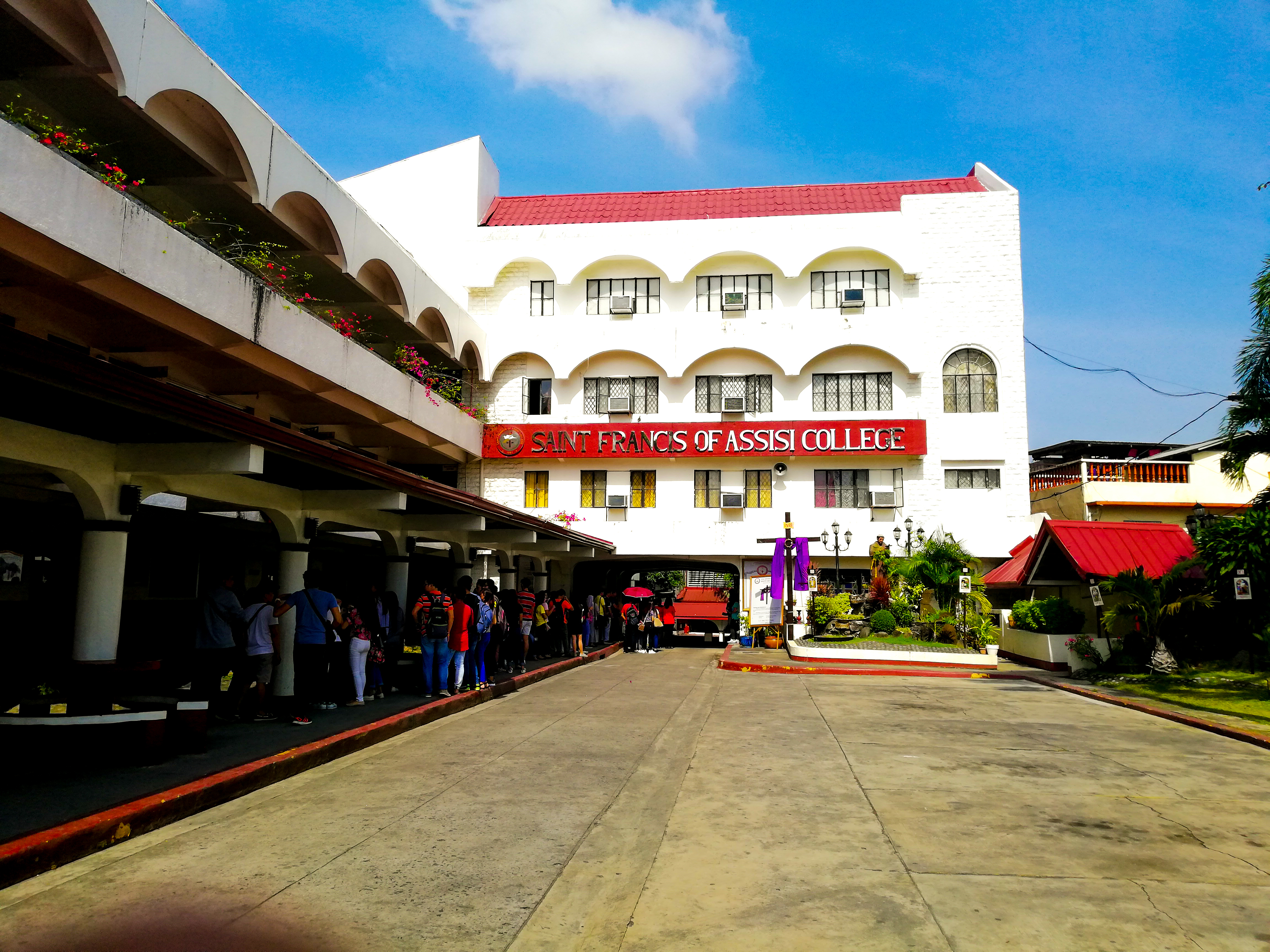
The SFAC Building of Main Campus

The Saint Francis of Assisi College (SFAC) is a learning institution offering education from pre-school up to the graduate level. Founded in 1981 with about 80 pre-school pupils, SFAC now consists of more than 10,000 students spread across nine campuses in the Southern Luzon area. Main Campus is located in Admiral Village, Talon III, Las Piñas. Saint Francis of Assisi College (SFAC) is one of the prime educational institutions with Home Study Culture in the Philippines that began in the early 1990s where the program was not yet recognized in the country.

== Campuses ==
- SFAC Las Piñas (Main Campus)
- SFAC Bacoor Campus
- SFAC Taguig Campus
- SFAC Alabang Campus
- SFAC Dasmariñas Campus
- SFAC Southwoods Campus
- SFAC Santa Rosa, Laguna Campus
- Saint Anthony School Los Baños, Laguna

== Basic Education Program ==
- Preschool Program
  - Nursery
  - Pre-Kindergarten
  - Kindergarten
- Elementary Grades 1-6
- Science Elementary Grades 4-6
- High School
  - Research-Enhanced Junior High School, Grade 7 - Grade 10
  - Franciscan Home Study Program, Grade 7 - Grade 10
  - Senior High School, Grade 11 - Grade 12
    - Science & Technology, Engineering & Mathematics (STEM)
    - Accountancy, Business and Management (ABM)
    - Humanities and Social Sciences (HUMSS)
    - General Academics (GAs)
    - Technical, Vocational and Livelihood (TVL) - Home Economics (HE)
    - Technical, Vocational and Livelihood (TVL) - Information and Communications Technology (ICT)

== Higher Education Program ==
- School of Nursing
  - Bachelor of Science in Nursing (BSN) (4 years)
- School of Computer Studies
  - Bachelor of Science in Computer Science BSCS (4 years)
- School of Engineering
  - Bachelor of Science in Electronics and Communications Engineering BSCECE (5 years)
  - Bachelor of Science in Computer Engineering BSCoE (5 years)
  - Bachelor of Science in Electronics Engineering BSEE (5 years)
- School of Business Administration
  - Bachelor of Science in Business Administration (BSBA) (4 years)
  - Bachelor of Science in Hotel and Restaurant Management (BSHRM) (4 years)
- School of Education and Liberal Arts
  - Bachelor of Elementary Education (BEEd) (4 years)
  - Bachelor of Secondary Education (BSEd) (4 years)
  - Bachelor of Arts in Psychology (ABPsy) (4 years)
- Graduate Studies
  - Master of Arts in Education - Major in Educational Management (MaEd)
  - Master of Arts in education - Major in Guidance and Counseling (MaEd)
  - Master in Business Management (MBM)

== Notable alumni ==
- Ranidel de Ocampo - former professional basketball player and assistant coach for TNT Tropang Giga of Philippine Basketball Association (PBA)
- Rayver Cruz or Raymond Oliver Cruz Ilustre - Television artist at ABS-CBN and GMA
- Marian Rivera - Dantes - Television artist, endorser and model
- Sitti Navarro - The "Filipino Bossa Nova", singer and song writer
- Wesley So - World chess grandmaster
- Rodjun Cruz - Television artist at ABS-CBN and GMA, dancer
- Ervin Sotto - 2004 PBA Draft player and former professional basketball player
- Jondan Salvador - Professional Basketball Player
- Kyline Alcantara - Television artist at ABS-CBN and GMA
- Kai Sotto - a Filipino professional basketball player
- RK Bagatsing a former elementary basketball player of Saint Francis of Assisi and Television artist at ABS-CBN and GMA

== Affiliations ==
- National Athletic Association of Schools, Colleges and Universities(NAASCU)
- National Collegiate Athletic Association (Philippines) South
- Universities and Colleges of Luzon Athletic Association
- National Capital Region Universities and Colleges of Luzon Athletic Association (NCRUCLAA)
