= 2004–05 FedEx Express season =

- Head coach: Bonnie Garcia; Joe Lipa; Bong Ramos
- Owner(s): Bert Lina; FedEx Philippines

Fiesta Conference (Transition) results
- Record: 5–14 (26.3%)
- Place: 9th
- Playoff finish: Wildcard

Philippine Cup results
- Record: 6–13 (31.6%)
- Place: 9th
- Playoff finish: Wildcard

Fiesta Conference results
- Record: 10–11 (47.6%)
- Place: 8th
- Playoff finish: Wildcard

FedEx Express seasons

The 2004–2005 FedEx Express season was the 3rd season of the franchise in the Philippine Basketball Association (PBA).

== Draft picks ==
Round	Pick	Player	Nationality	College
1	3	Marc Pingris	Philippines	PSBA
1	4	Ranidel De Ocampo	Philippines	Saint Francis
1	9	Wesley Gonzales	Philippines	Ateneo de Manila

== Occurrences ==
April 4, 2004: The Philippine team 20-and-under mentor Joe Lipa became the new head coach of FedEx, replacing Bonnie Garcia, PBA Commissioner Noli Eala set conditions that the veteran coach must severe his ties with the national team after the SEABA championships in September, or if coincides with the PBA, coach Joe Lipa must file a leave of absence from the FedEx ballclub.

== Roster ==
2004–05 FedEx Express roster
Players

Pos.	#	POB	Name	Height	Weight	DOB (YYYY–MM–DD)	From
G	3	(Philippines)	Egay Billones	5 ft 9 in (1.75 m)			Centro Escolar Las Piñas
G	14	(Philippines)	Renren Ritualo	6 ft 0 in (1.83 m)			De La Salle
F	15	(Philippines)	Marc Pingris	6 ft 4 in (1.93 m)			PSBA
F/C	16	(Philippines)	Omanzie Rodriguez	6 ft 6 in (1.98 m)			Mapúa
G/F	17	(Philippines)	Mike Bravo	6 ft 2 in (1.88 m)			Philippines
G/F	18	(Philippines)	Reinier Sison	6 ft 1 in (1.85 m)			Ateneo
G	19	(Philippines)	Wynne Arboleda	5 ft 11 in (1.80 m)			MLQU
G	20	(Philippines)	Gary David	6 ft 2 in (1.88 m)			Lyceum
G/F	21	(Philippines)	Bruce Dacia	6 ft 3 in (1.91 m)			Visayas
F	22	(Philippines)	John Ferriols	6 ft 4 in (1.93 m)			USJ–R
F	23	(Philippines)	Wesley Gonzales	6 ft 4 in (1.93 m)			Ateneo
F	33	(Philippines)	Ranidel De Ocampo	6 ft 5 in (1.96 m)			Saint Francis of Assisi
F/C	44	(Philippines)	Jerry Codiñera	6 ft 5 in (1.96 m)			UE
G	62	(Philippines)	Chito Victolero	5 ft 11 in (1.80 m)			Mapúa
F	10, 99	(Philippines)	Homer Se	6 ft 6 in (1.98 m)			San Sebastian

Coaches

Head coach

- (Philippines) Bong Ramos

Assistant coach(es)

- (Philippines) Jojo Villa

Legend

- (C) Team captain
- (I) Import
- Injured

== Philippine Cup ==
=== Game log ===
2004–05 PBA Philippine Cup game log
October

Game	Date	Opponent	Score	High points	High rebounds	High assists	Location Attendance	Record
1	October 8	Red Bull	102–95	Ferriols (21)			Makati Coliseum	1–0
2	October 13	Talk 'N Text	98–119	Ferriols (16)			Araneta Coliseum	1–1
3	October 17	Alaska	98–90	Ritualo (23)			Araneta Coliseum	2–1
4	October 21	Brgy.Ginebra	121–126				Dipolog	2–2
5	October 27	Coca Cola	67–84				Araneta Coliseum	2–3
6	October 29	Purefoods	102–98				Araneta Coliseum	3–3

December

Game	Date	Opponent	Score	High points	High rebounds	High assists	Location Attendance	Record
13	December 1	San Miguel	106–90	Ritualo (19)			Araneta Coliseum	5–8
14	December 9	Alaska	102–114				Urdaneta City	5–9
15	December 15	Sta.Lucia	114–104	Ritualo (24)			Araneta Coliseum	6–9
16	December 19	Shell	85–90	Ritualo (19)			Makati Coliseum	6–10
17	December 22	Purefoods	110–112	Ritualo (32)			Philsports Arena	6–11

January

Game	Date	Opponent	Score	High points	High rebounds	High assists	Location Attendance	Record
18	January 5	Coca Cola	97–104	Ritualo (25)			Philsports Arena	6–12

2004–05 schedule

== Transactions ==
=== Trades ===
Traded	to	For
Vergel Meneses	Red Bull Barako ^{September 2004}	Homer Se

=== Additions ===
Player	Signed	Former team
Reinier Sison	2004–05 Philippine Cup	
Gary David	2005 Fiesta	Coca Cola Tigers ^{Three-team trade}
Mike Bravo	2005 Fiesta	
Bruce Dacia	2005 Fiesta	
Ercito Victolero	2005 Fiesta	Sta. Lucia Realtors

=== Subtractions ===
Player	Signed	New team
Roger Yap	2004–05 Philippine Cup	Shell Turbo Chargers

== Recruited imports ==
Tournament	Name	#	Height	From	GP
2004 PBA Fiesta Conference	Alvin Jefferson	23	6 ft 8 in (2.03 m)	Auburn University	4
2004 PBA Fiesta Conference	Mike Maddox	2	6 ft 8 in (2.03 m)	Georgia Tech	15
2005 PBA Fiesta Conference	Anthony Miller	2	6 ft 9 in (2.06 m)	Michigan University	21

^{GP – Games played}
