= Dorian Peña =

Filipino basketball player

Personal information
- Born: October 12, 1977 (age 49) Cheverly, Maryland, U.S.
- Listed height: 6 ft 6 in (1.98 m)
- Listed weight: 280 lb (127 kg)

Career information
- High school: Lackey (Indian Head, Maryland)
- College: Coppin State (1995–1999)
- PBA draft: 2001: Elevated
- Playing career: 1999–2016
- Position: Center

Career history
- 1999: Negros Slashers
- 2000: Pasig-Rizal Pirates
- 2001–2011: San Miguel Beermen / Petron Blaze Boosters
- 2011–2012: Barako Bull Energy
- 2012–2013: Petron Blaze Boosters
- 2013–2015: Barako Bull Energy
- 2015: Barangay Ginebra San Miguel
- 2015–2016: GlobalPort Batang Pier

Career highlights
- 3× PBA champion (2001 All-Filipino, 2005 Fiesta, 2009 Fiesta); 2× PBA All-Star (2006, 2009); 2× PBA Mythical First Team (2005, 2007); PBA Mythical Second Team (2006); PBA All-Defensive Team (2006)

Dorian Alan Peña (born October 12, 1977) is a Filipino-American former professional basketball player. He is nicknamed the "Junkyard Dawg" for his consistent plays of putbacks and offensive rebounds. He previously played for the Negros Slashers and the Pasig-Rizal Pirates in the defunct Metropolitan Basketball Association before being recruited by the Beermen.

A Mythical Five member in the 2004–05 season, the 6-6 slotman was relegated to the Second Team the following year. He was one of the only three locals to average in double-double during a season, the other two being Eric Menk and Asi Taulava, both former Most Valuable Player winners. Peña averaged a career-best 13.2 points and 11.5 boards per game in the 2005–06 season and has been consistent since then.

After spending twelve seasons with the Beermen, he was traded to the Barako Bull Energy along with Dondon Hontiveros, Paul Artadi and Danny Seigle for Nonoy Baclao, Rey Guevarra and Rabeh Al-Hussaini. He spent a season with the Energy providing boost off the bench after being traded again back to his former team. Pena went back to Barako again after another trade and was waived eventually after one season. After testing the free agency, Pena signed a deal with the GlobalPort Batang Pier. He was waived before the start of the 2016-17 PBA season.

== PBA career statistics ==
Legend
GP	Games played	MPG	Minutes per game
FG%	Field-goal percentage	3P%	3-point field-goal percentage	FT%	Free-throw percentage
RPG	Rebounds per game	APG	Assists per game	SPG	Steals per game
BPG	Blocks per game	PPG	Points per game	**Bold**	Career high

=== Season-by-season averages ===
Year	Team	GP	MPG	FG%	3P%	FT%	RPG	APG	SPG	BPG	PPG
2001	San Miguel	55	19.8	.489	—	.421	5.9	.3	.3	.2	3.8
2002	San Miguel	49	29.3	**.566**	—	**.651**	9.0	.7	.3	**.5**	10.9
2003	San Miguel	32	**34.9**	.493	—	.595	**12.5**	**1.2**	.2	**.5**	12.2
2004–05	San Miguel	**70**	27.6	.472	—	.524	8.6	**1.2**	.2	.2	9.2
2005–06	San Miguel	42	31.1	.541	.000	.528	11.5	.8	**.4**	.2	**13.2**
2006–07	San Miguel	62	24.9	.552	.000	.525	8.6	.7	.3	.2	9.5
2007–08	Magnolia	35	20.5	.455	.000	.426	6.4	.8	.3	.3	5.9
2008–09	San Miguel	49	21.3	.460	.000	.552	7.1	.6	**.4**	**.5**	8.1
2009–10	San Miguel	52	15.3	.505	—	.441	5.6	.4	.2	.2	4.4
2010–11	San Miguel	40	20.6	.518	—	.338	8.3	.6	.1	.3	4.3
2010–11	Air21	40	20.6	.518	—	.338	8.3	.6	.1	.3	4.3
2011–12	Barako Bull	46	17.2	.443	.000	.548	6.4	.4	.2	.4	4.3
2011–12	Petron Blaze	46	17.2	.443	.000	.548	6.4	.4	.2	.4	4.3
2012–13	Petron Blaze	32	14.1	.407	—	.600	4.6	.2	.3	.2	1.9
2013–14	Barako Bull	24	20.5	.475	—	.452	6.0	.26	.2	.2	5.1
2014–15	Barako Bull	20	11.2	.111	—	.429	2.2	.3	.1	.1	.3
2014–15	Barangay Ginebra	20	11.2	.111	—	.429	2.2	.3	.1	.1	.3
2015–16	GlobalPort	15	4.2	.500	—	—	.9	.0	.1	.0	.3
Career		623	22.2	.502	.000	.524	7.4	0.7	.3	.3	6.9

== Criminal charges ==
Pena was arrested on drug charges on May 11, 2017, in a buy-bust operation held in Mandaluyong, Philippines.

== Awards ==
- 2005-06 PBA Mythical Second Team
- 2005-06 PBA All-Defensive Team
- 2004-05 PBA Mythical First Team
