= 2003 FedEx Express season =

- Head coach: Derrick Pumaren; Bonnie Garcia
- General manager: Lito Alvarez
- Owners: Bert Lina; FedEx Philippines

All-Filipino Cup results
- Record: 11–10 (52.4%)
- Place: N/A
- Playoff finish: N/A

Invitational Cup results
- Record: 4–2 (66.7%)
- Place: 3rd
- Playoff finish: Semis (lost to Coca–Cola)

Reinforced Conference results
- Record: 5–10 (33.3%)
- Place: N/A
- Playoff finish: QF (lost to San Miguel)

FedEx Express seasons

The 2003 FedEx Express season was the 2nd season of the franchise in the Philippine Basketball Association (PBA).

== Draft picks ==
| Round | Pick | Player | Nationality | College |
|---|---|---|---|---|
| 2 | 12 | John Ferriols | Philippines | San Jose |
| 3 | 21 | Bruce Dacia | Philippines | Visayas |
| 4 | 27 | Kalani Ferreria | United States | Moorpark |
| 5 | 39 | Mike Bravo | Philippines | UP Diliman |

== Occurrences ==
April 15: PBA Commissioner Noli Eala ordered the FedEx management to honor the remainder of Rene "Bong" Hawkins' four-year contract which the ballclub assumed from the disbanded Tanduay Rhum Masters, the contract is worth P400,000 a month.

May 20: FedEx appeals before the PBA board on the earlier decision after cager Bong Hawkins reportedly turned down a P2.7 million settlement offered by the team.

September 12: Express' coaching consultant Bonnie Garcia was elevated to the position of head coach, replacing Derrick Pumaren.

== Roster ==
2003 FedEx Express roster
Players

| Pos. | # | POB | Name | Height | Weight | DOB (YYYY–MM–DD) | From |
|---|---|---|---|---|---|---|---|
| G | 3 | (Philippines) | Egay Billones | 5 ft 9 in (1.75 m) | | | Centro Escolar Las Piñas |
| C | 7 | (Philippines) | Marvin Ortiguerra | 6 ft 4 in (1.93 m) | | | UST |
| F | 8 | (Philippines) | Vergel Meneses | 6 ft 2 in (1.88 m) | | | José Rizal |
| G | 9 | (Philippines) | Gherome Ejercito | 6 ft 2 in (1.88 m) | | | Adamson |
| G | 13 | (Philippines) | Roger Yap | 6 ft 1 in (1.85 m) | | | USJ–R |
| G | 14 | (Philippines) | Renren Ritualo | 6 ft 0 in (1.83 m) | | | De La Salle |
| F/C | 16 | (Philippines) | Omanzie Rodriguez | 6 ft 6 in (1.98 m) | | | Mapúa |
| F/C | 18 | (Philippines) | Yancy De Ocampo | 6 ft 8 in (2.03 m) | | | Saint Francis of Assisi |
| G | 19 | (Philippines) | Wynne Arboleda | 5 ft 11 in (1.80 m) | | | MLQU |
| F | 22 | (Philippines) | John Ferriols | 6 ft 4 in (1.93 m) | | | USJ–R |
| F | 31 | (Philippines) | Ryan Bernardo | 6 ft 4 in (1.93 m) | | | UST |
| F | 33 | (United States) | Terrence Shannon (I) | 6 ft 5 in (1.96 m) | | | Elgin CC |
| F/C | 44 | (Philippines) | Jerry Codinera | 6 ft 5 in (1.96 m) | | | UE |

Coaches

Head coach

- (Philippines) Bonnie Garcia

Assistant coach(es)

- (Philippines) Gee Abanilla
- (Philippines) Jun Tiongco
- (Philippines) Jojo Lavina

Legend

- (C) Team captain
- (I) Import
- Injured

== Game results ==
=== All-Filipino Cup ===
| Date | Opponent | Score | Top scorer | Venue | Location |
|---|---|---|---|---|---|
| February 28 | Red Bull | 71–79 | Codiñera (18 pts) | Makati Coliseum | Makati City |
| March 7 | Sta.Lucia | 71–81 | | Ynares Center | Antipolo City |
| March 12 | Purefoods | 90–86 | | Philsports Arena | Pasig City |
| March 15 | Alaska | 90–86 | | | Bago City |
| March 19 | Shell | 98–92 | Meneses (30 pts) | Philsports Arena | Pasig City |
| March 23 | Coca-Cola | 85–72 | | Araneta Coliseum | Quezon City |
| March 30 | Brgy.Ginebra | 81–101 | | Araneta Coliseum | Quezon City |
| April 4 | Alaska | 93–95 | Ritualo (27 pts) | Philsports Arena | Pasig City |
| April 9 | Talk 'N Text | 86–93 OT | Meneses (22 pts) | Philsports Arena | Pasig City |
| April 16 | San Miguel | 91–81 | | Philsports Arena | Pasig City |
| April 25 | Shell | 65–80 | | Philsports Arena | Pasig City |
| April 27 | Red Bull | 81–78 | | Araneta Coliseum | Quezon City |
| May 2 | Brgy.Ginebra | 85–81 | | Philsports Arena | Pasig City |
| May 9 | Talk 'N Text | 116–105 | | Philsports Arena | Pasig City |
| May 14 | Purefoods | 77–76 | Meneses (23 pts) | Philsports Arena | Pasig City |
| May 18 | Sta.Lucia | 76–75 | | Araneta Coliseum | Quezon City |
| May 23 | San Miguel | 79–88 | | Makati Coliseum | Makati City |
| May 28 | Coca-Cola | 87–89 | | Philsports Arena | Pasig City |

Win
Win via OT
loss
loss via OT

== Transactions ==
=== Additions ===
| Player | Signed | Former team |
|---|---|---|
| Gherome Ejercito | Off-season | Sta. Lucia Realtors |
| Marvin Ortiguerra | Off-season | Sta. Lucia Realtors |
| Omanzie Rodriguez | Off-season | Sta. Lucia Realtors |
| Roger Yap | Off-season | Purefoods TJ Hotdogs |

=== Subtractions ===
| Player | Signed | Former team |
|---|---|---|
| Dindo Pumaren | Off-season | Retired from professional playing |
| Zaldy Realubit | Off-season | Free agency |
| Biboy Simon | Off-season | Free agency (but later signed with MBA) |
