= 2004–05 San Miguel Beermen season =

- Head coach: Jong Uichico
- General Manager: Robert Non (until February 2004); Chito Loyzaga
- Owner(s): San Miguel Corporation

Fiesta Conference (Transition) results
- Record: 17–4 (81%)
- Place: 5th
- Playoff finish: Quarterfinals

Philippine Cup results
- Record: 16–13 (55.2%)
- Place: 3rd
- Playoff finish: Semifinals

Fiesta Conference results
- Record: 19–9 (67.9%)
- Place: 1st
- Playoff finish: Champions

San Miguel Beermen seasons

The 2004–2005 San Miguel Beermen season was the 30th season of the franchise in the Philippine Basketball Association (PBA).

== Transactions ==
Transactions
Gilbert Malabanan ^{Acquired from Barangay Ginebra}
Danny Seigle ^{Re-Signed by San Miguel; placed on the injured list the past two seasons}
Dale Singson ^{Acquired from Shell when the Beermen gave up their 7th pick in the rookie draft}
Denver Lopez ^{Acquired from Red Bull when the Beermen traded Bryan Gahol}
Francis Adriano ^{Signed in the 2005 Fiesta Conference}

== Championship ==
The San Miguel Beermen won their 17th PBA title and their first championship in four years during the 2005 PBA Fiesta Conference, defeating Talk 'N Text Phone Pals, four games to one. The Beermen last won a crown in the 2001 All-Filipino Cup.

== Occurrences ==
In February 7, 2004, Chito Loyzaga was appointed as Beermen's manager.

== Roster ==
2004–05 San Miguel Beermen roster
Players

| Pos. | # | POB | Name | Height | Weight | DOB (YYYY–MM–DD) | From |
|---|---|---|---|---|---|---|---|
| F | 3 | (United States) | Nic Belasco | 6 ft 4 in (1.93 m) | | | Notre Dame (OH) |
| C | 4 | (United States) | Dorian Peña | 6 ft 6 in (1.98 m) | | | Coppin State |
| G | 7 | (Philippines) | Dondon Hontiveros | 6 ft 2 in (1.88 m) | | | Cebu |
| F/C | 10 | (Philippines) | Danny Ildefonso | 6 ft 6 in (1.98 m) | | | National-U |
| G | 11 | (Philippines) | Francis Adriano | 6 ft 0 in (1.83 m) | | | Far Eastern |
| G | 13 | (Philippines) | Anton Villoria | 5 ft 11 in (1.80 m) | | | Letran |
| F | 15 | (Philippines) | Gilbert Malabanan | 6 ft 4 in (1.93 m) | | | UPHSD |
| F | 16 | (Philippines) | Frederick Canlas | 6 ft 7 in (2.01 m) | | | Saint Francis of Assisi |
| G | 17 | (Philippines) | Olsen Racela (C) | 5 ft 10 in (1.78 m) | | | Ateneo |
| G | 21 | (Philippines) | Joey Mente | 5 ft 10 in (1.78 m) | | | Lyceum |
| G | 31 | (Philippines) | Alvin Castro | 6 ft 3 in (1.91 m) | | | De La Salle |
| F/C | 34 | (Philippines) | Arnold Gamboa | 6 ft 6 in (1.98 m) | | | Far Eastern |
| F | 42 | (United States) | Danny Seigle | 6 ft 6 in (1.98 m) | | | Wagner |
| G | 44 | (United States) | Denver Lopez (A) | 6 ft 1 in (1.85 m) | | | Cal State Fullerton |
| G | 50 | (Philippines) | Dale Singson | 6 ft 0 in (1.83 m) | | | UST |

Coaches
Head coach
- (Philippines) Jong Uichico
Assistant(s)
- (Philippines) Arturo dela Cruz
- (Philippines) Boybits Victoria

Legend
- (DP) Unsigned draft pick
- (FA) Free agent
- (S) Suspended
- (A) Acquired via trade
- Injured

== Philippine Cup ==
=== Game log ===
2005 PBA Philippine Cup game log
October

| Game | Date | Opponent | Score | High points | High rebounds | High assists | Location Attendance | Record |
|---|---|---|---|---|---|---|---|---|
| 1 | October 3 | Talk 'N Text | 89–93 | Hontiveros (17) Gahol (17) | | | Araneta Coliseum | 0–1 |
| 2 | October 7 | Sta.Lucia | 79–73 | | | | Zamboanga City | 1–1 |
| 3 | October 13 | Brgy.Ginebra | 83–72 | Hontiveros (18) | | | Araneta Coliseum | 2–1 |
| 4 | October 17 | Coca Cola | 84–92 | Belasco (22) | | | Araneta Coliseum | 2–2 |
| 5 | October 20 | Air21 | 67–70 | | | | Araneta Coliseum | 2–3 |
| 6 | October 24 | Alaska | 75–67 | Hontiveros (17) | | | Araneta Coliseum | 3–3 |
| 7 | October 29 | Red Bull | 93–82 | | | | Araneta Coliseum | 4–3 |

December

| Game | Date | Opponent | Score | High points | High rebounds | High assists | Location Attendance | Record |
|---|---|---|---|---|---|---|---|---|
| 13 | December 1 | FedEx | 90–106 | Seigle (21) | | | Araneta Coliseum | 6–7 |
| 14 | December 8 | Purefoods | 93–86 | Belasco (28) | | | Philsports Arena | 7–7 |
| 15 | December 10 | Talk 'N Text | 82–97 | Seigle (18) | | | Araneta Coliseum | 7–8 |
| 16 | December 16 | Coca Cola | 80–75 | Belasco (30) | | | Dagupan | 8–8 |
| 17 | December 21 | Brgy.Ginebra | | | | | Laoag City | 8–9 |
| 18 | December 25 | Red Bull | 92–78 | Belasco (27) | | | Cuneta Astrodome | 9–9 |

2004–05 schedule

== Recruited imports ==
| Tournament | Name | # | Height | From | GP |
|---|---|---|---|---|---|
| 2004 PBA Fiesta Conference | Art Long | 00 | 6 ft 9 in (2.06 m) | University of Cincinnati | 20 |
| 2005 PBA Fiesta Conference | Chris Burgess | 34 | 6 ft 9 in (2.06 m) | University of Utah | 20 |
| 2005 PBA Fiesta Conference | Tommy Smith | 1 | 6 ft 9 in (2.06 m) | Arizona State | 1 |
| 2005 PBA Fiesta Conference | Ace Custis | 23 | 6 ft 7 in (2.01 m) | Virginia Tech | 7 |

^{GP – Games played}
