= Egay Billones =

Filipino basketball player

Egay Billiones
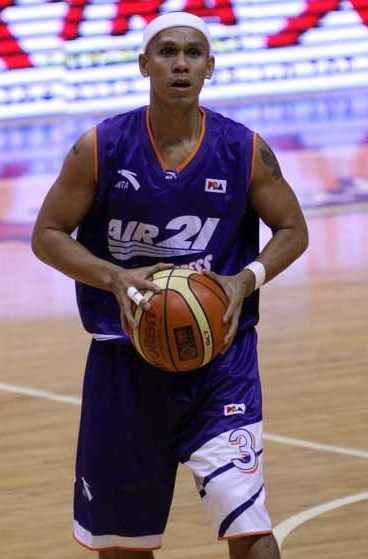
- Billones in 2008

Personal information
- Born: November 3, 1975 (age 51) New Washington, Aklan, Philippines
- Listed height: 5 ft 9 in (1.75 m)
- Listed weight: 165 lb (75 kg)

Career information
- College: Las Piñas College
- PBA draft: 2000: 1st round, 6th overall pick
- Drafted by: Barangay Ginebra Kings
- Playing career: 2002–2011, 2018
- Position: Point guard

Career history
- 2002–2006: Air21 Express
- 2005–2006: Purefoods Chunkee Giants
- 2006–2008: Talk 'N Text Phone Pals
- 2008–2010: Air21 Express
- 2010–2011: Philippine Patriots
- 2011: Misamis Oriental Meteors
- 2018: Muntinlupa Cagers

Career highlights
- PBA champion (2005–06 Philippine)

Ernesto "Egay" Billiones (born November 3, 1975) is a Filipino former professional basketball player. He has played in the Philippine Basketball Association, ASEAN Basketball League, and Maharlika Pilipinas Basketball League.

== Career ==
He was selected by the Gin Kings in the 2000 PBA Draft but was dropped. Billones decided to play in the PBL for Blu Detergent.

He played for Air21 (FedEx) from 2002-2006 before being signed by Talk 'N Text in 2007. He was released in early 2008. In the ASEAN Basketball League, he played for the Philippine Patriots.

Billones debuted at the Maharlika Pilipinas Basketball League with the Muntinlupa Cagers in February 2018.

== PBA career statistics ==
Legend
GP	Games played	MPG	Minutes per game
FG%	Field-goal percentage	3P%	3-point field-goal percentage	FT%	Free-throw percentage
RPG	Rebounds per game	APG	Assists per game	SPG	Steals per game
BPG	Blocks per game	PPG	Points per game	**Bold**	Career high

=== Season-by-season averages ===
Year	Team	GP	MPG	FG%	3P%	FT%	RPG	APG	SPG	BPG	PPG
2002	FedEx	13	8.3	.444	.357	.000	.9	.8	.2	.0	2.9
2003	FedEx	40	**22.4**	.416	.196	**.800**	**2.7**	**3.0**	**.7**	.0	6.1
2004–05	FedEx	**59**	16.3	.437	.383	.717	1.7	2.4	.4	.0	5.3
2005–06	Purefoods	33	7.3	.284	.065	.533	1.1	.5	.2	.0	1.6
2006–07	Talk 'N Text	40	16.7	.414	.355	.694	2.0	2.0	.4	.0	5.9
2007–08	Talk 'N Text	34	10.6	**.470**	**.400**	.610	1.3	.6	.2	.0	5.1
2007–08	Air21	34	10.6	**.470**	**.400**	.610	1.3	.6	.2	.0	5.1
2008–09	Air21 / Burger King	42	14.7	.398	.353	.667	1.6	1.5	.2	.0	**6.7**
2009–10	Burger King / Air21	31	12.5	.381	.279	.731	1.3	1.7	.2	.0	4.1
Career		292	14.5	.412	.323	.689	1.7	1.7	.3	.0	5.0
