= 2009–10 San Miguel Beermen season =

- Head coach: Siot Tanquincen
- General Manager: Hector Calma
- Owner(s): San Miguel Corporation

Philippine Cup results
- Record: 13–5 (72.2%)
- Place: 1st (tied)
- Playoff finish: Semifinals (lost to Purefoods, 4–2)

Fiesta Conference results
- Record: 13–5 (72.2%)
- Place: 2nd (tied)
- Playoff finish: Runner-up (lost to Alaska, 2–4)

San Miguel Beermen seasons

The 2009–10 San Miguel Beermen season was the 35th season of the franchise in the Philippine Basketball Association (PBA).

== Key dates ==
- August 2: The 2009 PBA Draft took place in Fort Bonifacio, Taguig.

== Draft picks ==
Round	Pick	Player	Height	Position	Nationality	College
1	10	James Sena	6 ft. 5 in.	Center	Philippines	JRU

== Roster ==
2009–10 San Miguel Beermen roster
Players

Pos.	#	POB	Name	Height	Weight	DOB (YYYY–MM–DD)	From
G	3	(Philippines)	Jonas Villanueva	6 ft 0 in (1.83 m)	170 lb (77 kg)		Far Eastern
F/C	4	(United States)	Dorian Peña	6 ft 6 in (1.98 m)	235 lb (107 kg)		Coppin State
G	5	(Philippines)	Alex Cabagnot	6 ft 0 in (1.83 m)	165 lb (75 kg)		Hawaiʻi–Hilo
G/F	7	(Philippines)	Dondon Hontiveros	6 ft 2 in (1.88 m)	180 lb (82 kg)		Cebu
F/C	10	(Philippines)	Danny Ildefonso	6 ft 6 in (1.98 m)	210 lb (95 kg)		National-U
G/F	15	(Philippines)	Lordy Tugade	6 ft 3 in (1.91 m)	185 lb (84 kg)		National-U
G	17	(Philippines)	Olsen Racela (C)	5 ft 10 in (1.78 m)	165 lb (75 kg)		Ateneo
G	18	(Philippines)	Joseph Yeo	5 ft 11 in (1.80 m)	170 lb (77 kg)		De La Salle
F	23	(Philippines)	Jay Washington (injured)	6 ft 7 in (2.01 m)	220 lb (100 kg)		Eckerd
F	29	(Philippines)	Arwind Santos	6 ft 4 in (1.93 m)	175 lb (79 kg)		Far Eastern
G	32	(Philippines)	Dennis Miranda	6 ft 0 in (1.83 m)	180 lb (82 kg)		Far Eastern
F/C	34	(Australia)	Mick Pennisi	6 ft 9 in (2.06 m)	235 lb (107 kg)		Eastern Michigan
F	42	(United States)	Danny Seigle (injured)	6 ft 6 in (1.98 m)	205 lb (93 kg)		Wagner
F/C	45	(Philippines)	Michael Holper	6 ft 6 in (1.98 m)	210 lb (95 kg)		San Diego State
G	88	(Philippines)	Chris Calaguio	6 ft 1 in (1.85 m)	180 lb (82 kg)		Letran

Coaches
Head coach
- (Philippines) Siot Tanquingcen (UST)
Assistant(s)
- (Philippines) Gee Abanilla (De La Salle)
- (Philippines) Pido Jarencio (UST)
- (Philippines) Freddie Abuda (Cebu)
- (Philippines) Biboy Ravanes (Cebu)

Legend
- (DP) Unsigned draft pick
- (FA) Free agent
- (S) Suspended
- (I) Import
- Injured

== Philippine Cup ==
=== Eliminations ===
==== Standings ====
Pos	Team	W	L	PCT	GB	Qualification
1	Alaska Aces	13	5	.722 (Note: Head-to-head record: Alaska 2–0 San Miguel)	—	Advance to semifinals
2	San Miguel Beermen	13	5	.722	—	Advance to semifinals
3	Purefoods Tender Juicy Giants	12	6	.667 (Note: Head-to-head record: Purefoods 1–1 Barangay Ginebra; Purefoods 0, Barangay Ginebra 0; overall point differential: Purefoods +85, Barangay Ginebra +75)	1	Advance to quarterfinals
4	Barangay Ginebra Kings	12	6	.667	1	Advance to quarterfinals
5	Talk 'N Text Tropang Texters	11	7	.611	2	Advance to quarterfinals
6	Sta. Lucia Realtors	10	8	.556	3	Advance to wildcard round
7	Coca-Cola Tigers	6	12	.333 (Note: Head-to-head record: Burger King 1–1, Coca-Cola; Burger King +10, Coca-Cola −10)	7	Advance to wildcard round
8	Burger King Whoppers	6	12	.333	7	Advance to wildcard round
9	Rain or Shine Elasto Painters	4	14	.222	9	Advance to wildcard round
10	Barako Bull Energy Boosters	3	15	.167	10	
—	Smart Gilas (G)	3	6	.333	5.5	Guest team (Note: Smart Gilas's results do not count in the standings.)

Source: PBA.ph
(G) Guests

==== Game log ====
===== Eliminations =====
2010 PBA Philippine Cup game log
October

Game	Date	Opponent	Score	High points	High rebounds	High assists	Location Attendance	Record
1	October 14	Barangay Ginebra	93–86	Ildefonso (19)	Peña (15)	Racela (5)	Araneta Coliseum	0–1
2	October 17	Alaska	74–85	Santos, Hontiveros (15)	Peña (13)	Custodio (5)	Panabo, Davao del Norte	0–2
3	October 21	Burger King	117–99	Santos (28)	Santos (18)	Racela (5)	Cuneta Astrodome	1–2
4	October 28	Talk 'N Text	100–90	Santos, Hontiveros (17)	Peña (10)	Custodio (7)	Araneta Coliseum	2–2

November

Game	Date	Opponent	Score	High points	High rebounds	High assists	Location Attendance	Record
5	November 4	Rain or Shine	93–77	Tugade (16)	Santos (9)	Custodio (4)	Araneta Coliseum	3–2
6	November 7	Sta. Lucia	88–69	Santos (21)	Peña (15)	Cortez (4)	Victorias City, Negros Occidental	4–2
7	November 11	Purefoods	92–76	Cortez (22)	Peña (11)	Villanueva (7)	Araneta Coliseum	5–2
8	November 15	Barako Bull	104–89	Santos (33)	Santos (8)	Villanueva (11)	Araneta Coliseum	6–2
9	November 21	Coca Cola	107–84	Hontiveros (17)	Eman (12)	Villanueva (5)	Cebu City	7–2
10	November 27	Smart Gilas	96–109				Ynares Center	
11	November 29	Burger King	100–85	Santos (27)	Santos (12)	Villanueva (7)	Ynares Sports Arena	8–2

December

Game	Date	Opponent	Score	High points	High rebounds	High assists	Location Attendance	Record
12	December 4	Sta. Lucia	110–94	Hontiveros (21)	Santos (11)	Miranda (9)	Araneta Coliseum	9–2
13	December 9	Alaska	116–112 (OT)	Santos (24)	Santos (14)	Villanueva (7)	Araneta Coliseum	9–3
14	December 13	Purefoods	87–80	Santos, Hontiveros (18)	Peña (9)	Villanueva (6)	Araneta Coliseum	10–3
15	December 18	Rain or Shine	104–90	Seigle (20)	Santos (10)	Cortez (8)	Araneta Coliseum	11–3
16	December 20	Barangay Ginebra	91–86 (OT)	Villanueva (17)	Peña (12)	Villanueva, Cortez (4)	Araneta Coliseum	12–3

January

Game	Date	Opponent	Score	High points	High rebounds	High assists	Location Attendance	Record
17	January 8	Barako Bull	94–85	Santos (29)	Santos (12)	Villanueva (10)	Cuneta Astrodome	13–3
18	January 13	Coca Cola	107–118	Santos (22)	Santos (11)	Cortez, Miranda (6)	Araneta Coliseum	13–4
19	January 16	Talk 'N Text	91–93	Cortez (20)	Washington (13)	Hontiveros (5)	Zamboanga City	13–5

2009–10 schedule

===== Playoffs =====
2010 PBA Philippine Cup playoffs game log
Semifinals

Game	Date	Opponent	Score	High points	High rebounds	High assists	Location Attendance	Record
1	February 10	Purefoods	99–83	Washington, Hontiveros (17)	Washington (10)	Villanueva (6)	Araneta Coliseum	1–0
2	February 12	Purefoods	84–103	Seigle (16)	Santos (12)	Cortez, 2 others (3)	Cuneta Astrodome	1–1
3	February 14	Purefoods	88–76	Washington, Hontiveros (15)	Santos (13)	Cortez (9)	Araneta Coliseum	2–1
4	February 17	Purefoods	84–97	Ildefonso (17)	Santos (11)	Villanueva (6)	Araneta Coliseum	2–2
5	February 19	Purefoods	82–94	Washington (21)	Peña (9)	Villanueva (6)	Araneta Coliseum	2–3
6	February 21	Purefoods	78–87	Santos (20)	Santos (8)	Villanueva (5)	Cuneta Astrodome	2–4

Battle for Third

Game	Date	Opponent	Score	High points	High rebounds	High assists	Location Attendance	Record
1	February 10	Barangay Ginebra	95–88				Araneta Coliseum	

2009–10 schedule

== Fiesta Conference ==
=== Eliminations ===
==== Standings ====
Pos	Team	W	L	PCT	GB	Qualification
1	Talk 'N Text Tropang Texters	15	3	.833	—	Advance to semifinals
2	San Miguel Beermen	13	5	.722 (Note: Second seed playoff: San Miguel 88, Derby Ace 83)	2	Advance to semifinals
3	Derby Ace Llamados	13	5	.722	2	Advance to quarterfinals
4	Alaska Aces	11	7	.611	4	Advance to quarterfinals
5	Barangay Ginebra Kings	9	9	.500 (Note: Fifth seed playoff: Barangay Ginebra 115, Rain or Shine 88)	6	Advance to quarterfinals
6	Rain or Shine Elasto Painters	9	9	.500	6	Advance to wildcard round
7	Coca-Cola Tigers	8	10	.444	7	Advance to wildcard round
8	Sta. Lucia Realtors	5	13	.278	10	Advance to wildcard round
9	Air21 Express	4	14	.222	11	Advance to wildcard round
10	Barako Energy Coffee Masters	3	15	.167	12	

Source: PBA.ph

== Transactions ==
=== Pre-season ===
San Miguel Beermen

Players Added

Via Draft

- James Sena

Via Free Agency

- Michael Holper (From Coca-Cola)

Via Trade

- Arwind Santos (From Burger King)
- Dennis Miranda (From Sta. Lucia)
Players Lost

Via Free Agency

- Froilan Baguion

Via Trade

- Marc Pingris (To Purefoods)
- Ken Bono (To Burger King)

=== Mid-season break ===
March 8, 2010	To Air21 Mike Cortez	To San Miguel Alex Cabagnot
March 8, 2010	To Sta. Lucia Bonbon Custodio	To San Miguel Joseph Yeo

=== Fiesta Conference ===
==== Imports recruited ====
Team	Player	Debuted	Final
San Miguel Beermen	Gabriel Freeman (1/1)	March 24, 2010	August 18, 2010
