= Dondon Hontiveros =

Filipino politician and former basketball player

The Honorable Dondon Hontiveros
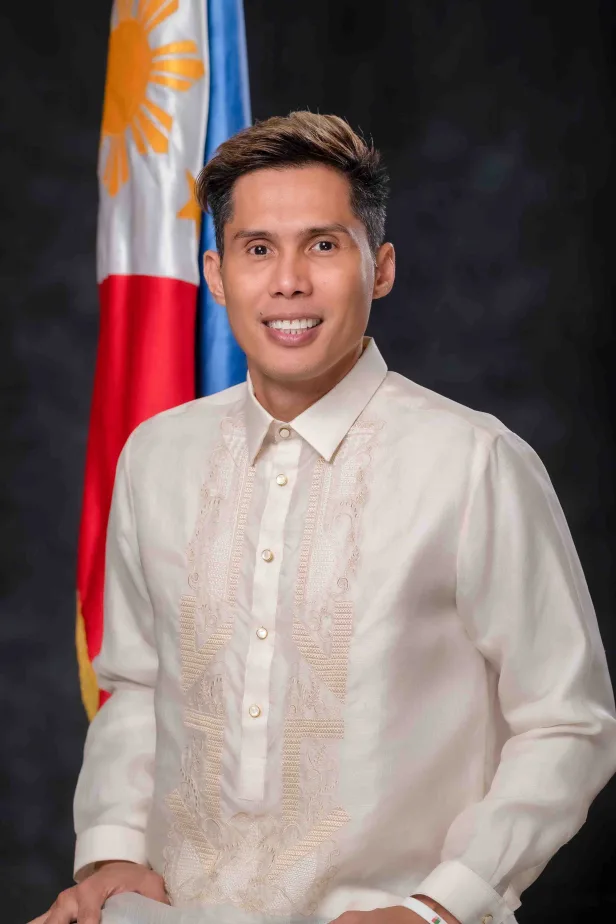
- Official portrait, 2022

Vice Mayor of Cebu City
- In office May 8, 2024 – June 30, 2025; Acting: May 8, 2024 – October 9, 2024
- Mayor: Raymond Alvin Garcia
- Preceded by: Raymond Alvin Garcia
- Succeeded by: Tomas Osmeña
- In office November 20, 2021 – June 30, 2022
- Mayor: Mike Rama
- Preceded by: Mike Rama
- Succeeded by: Raymond Alvin Garcia

Member of the Cebu City Council from the 2nd district
- In office June 30, 2022 – May 8, 2024
- In office June 30, 2019 – November 19, 2021

Personal details
- Born: Donaldo Cabañes Hontiveros; June 1, 1977 (age 49) Cebu City, Philippines
- Party: PDP (2018–2021; 2022–present); Barug (2018–present)
- Other political affiliations: Independent (2021–2022)
- Relatives: Risa Hontiveros (cousin); Pia Hontiveros (cousin)
- Basketball career

No. 25 – Cebu Greats
- Title: Shooting guard / small forward / assistant coach
- League: MPBL

Personal information
- Listed height: 6 ft 3 in (1.91 m)
- Listed weight: 175 lb (79 kg)

Career information
- College: UC
- PBA draft: 2000: Direct hire
- Drafted by: Tanduay Rhum Masters
- Playing career: 1998–2018; 2026–present
- Position: Shooting guard / small forward
- Coaching career: 2021–present

Career history

Playing
- 1998–1999: Cebu Gems
- 2000–2001: Tanduay Rhum Masters
- 2002–2011: San Miguel Beermen / Magnolia Beverage Masters
- 2011: Air21 Express
- 2011–2012: Petron Blaze Boosters
- 2012–2017: Alaska Aces
- 2017–2018: San Miguel Alab Pilipinas
- 2026–present: Cebu Greats

Coaching
- 2021, 2023: Phoenix Super LPG Fuel Masters (assistant)
- 2025–present: Cebu Greats (assistant)

Career highlights
- 3× PBA champion (2005 Fiesta, 2009 Fiesta, 2013 Commissioner's); 13× PBA All-Star (2000, 2001, 2003–2011, 2015, 2017); PBA All-Star Three-Point Shootout champion (2007); PBA Mythical Second Team (2009); PBA Sportsmanship Awardee (2005); ABL champion (2018); MBA All-Star MVP (1998); MBA Discovery of the Year (1998)

Donaldo "Dondon" Cabañes Hontiveros (born June 1, 1977) is a Filipino politician and professional basketball player and coach. He served as vice mayor of Cebu City twice: from 2021 to 2022 and from 2024 to 2025, both stints by virtue of succession.

Hontiveros was first elected to the Cebu City Council in 2019, garnering the most votes. In 2022, due to the death of Mayor Edgardo Labella, Vice Mayor Mike Rama assumed the mayorship while Hontiveros became the vice mayor. After finishing his term as vice mayor, he again garnered the most votes in the 2022 council election. In 2024, Mayor Mike Rama was suspended and later disqualified by the Office of the Ombudsman, thus Vice Mayor Raymond Alvin Garcia assumed the mayorship and Hontiveros became vice mayor again.

In basketball, Hontiveros has won three Philippine Basketball Association (PBA) championships and was a 13-time PBA All-Star. He started his career in his hometown of Cebu City, playing for the University of Cebu at the collegiate level and becoming professional with the Cebu Gems of the Metropolitan Basketball Association (MBA). In the 2000 PBA draft, he was a direct hire of Tanduay and was later traded to the San Miguel Beermen, where he won the 2005 and 2009 PBA Fiesta Conferences. In 2013, he won the PBA Commissioner's Cup with the Alaska Aces. He then won an ASEAN Basketball League (ABL) championship in 2018 with San Miguel Alab Pilipinas. He thereafter ventured into politics and coaching. He served as an assistant coach for the Phoenix Super LPG Fuel Masters of the PBA from 2022 to 2023. In 2025, he served as an assistant coach for the Cebu Greats of the Maharlika Pilipinas Basketball League (MPBL) since 2025 before returning to the court as a playing coach in 2026.

== Early life, high school and collegiate career ==
Born in Cebu City, Hontiveros fancied basketball at a young age and tried to enter the sport at a competitive level in his first year of high school. But at that time, since he lacked the height, no one took notice of him. However, he had a growth spurt by the time he was in third year so he was taken into the high school basketball team of Don Bosco Technical College–Cebu.

His first year with the varsity team was spent mostly on the bench. By the time he became a high school senior, he was already part of the team's rotation. At this point, he was already as tall as the team's center. His jump to college basketball suffered a minor setback when he ended his senior high school year with an injury. To keep himself competitive, he played in the intramural games at University of San Jose–Recoletos.

He eventually played college basketball at the University of Cebu for three years.

== Professional career ==
=== Metropolitan Basketball Association ===
Hontiveros joined the Metropolitan Basketball Association in its maiden season in 1998 playing for the Cebu Gems. However, despite being a fan favorite among the Cebuano fans, his stint with the Gems was marred with chaos, as he requested to be released by the team because he wanted to finish his studies and the constant travelling to different provinces with the team prompted him to drop some of his subjects.

=== Philippine Basketball Association ===
The Cebu Gems management tried to trade Hontiveros to different MBA teams. But Hontiveros' desire to play for the PBA eventually materialized as the Gems strike an agreement with Tanduay Rhum Masters, who acquired Hontiveros in exchange for cash. But after Tanduay franchise was sold to the Lina Group in 2002, San Miguel (his favorite team) acquired him through a trade. Soon, he found himself a vital cog in the team's offensive rotation as he was quickly promoted as a starter for the team. He was a member of the two championships won by San Miguel in 2004-2005 Fiesta Conference and the 2009 Fiesta Conference.

In March 2011, he, along with Danny Seigle, Dorian Pena and Paul Artadi were shipped to Air21 for younger players Rabeh Al-Hussaini, Nonoy Baclao and Rey Guevarra. During his stint with the Express, he emerged as one of the key players In 2011 draft-day, he was traded back to Petron (San Miguel) along with the No.3 pick which was used to draft Chris Lutz.

Before the end of August 2012, he was involved in a six-player, four-team trade that sent him to Alaska. He was a vital addition off-the-bench for the Aces, and was a member of the 2013 championship team. He would often provide heroics when it mattered, as evidenced in the games he played during the 2014-15 Philippine Cup. He was the game's best player once during the elimination round against NLEX, and would provide his usual heroics in the playoffs, once against Rain or Shine and another during the Game 6 (a potential elimination game) against San Miguel in the finals.

On January 16, 2015, he surpassed fellow Cebuano gunner Al Solis for the No. 4 all time in three-point field goals with 1,002.

=== ASEAN Basketball League ===
After finishing his contract with Alaska, Hontiveros was signed by ASEAN Basketball League (ABL) team Alab Pilipinas.

=== Maharlika Pilipinas Basketball League ===
Hontiveros resumed his playing career with Maharlika Pilipinas Basketball League side Cebu Greats, serving as a playing coach starting in the 2026 MPBL season. Hontiveros previously served as an assistant coach for the Greats in 2025.

== National team career ==
Hontiveros played for the Philippine national team in 2002 and 2007. He also donned the national colors for the Smart-Gilas Team Pilipinas in 2011 and helped Gilas Pilipinas defeat Japan in the semifinals of the 2015 FIBA Asia Championship in China.

== Political career ==
In the 2019 elections, Hontiveros won a seat in the Cebu City Council. Running under Barug PDP–Laban, he garnered the most votes in the 2nd district. He then became chairman of the council's Committee on Scholarship Program and Committee on Games and Amusement, and vice-chairman of the Committee on Youth and Sports Development. He sponsored the resolution that amended the city's scholarship program to include high school dropouts pursuing vocational education.

In September 2021, Hontiveros and colleague Phillip Zafra announced that they will seek reelection in 2022 as independent candidates; Barug PDP-Laban still endorses them as guest candidates. On October 31, the two councilors announced that they had changed their minds and would not leave Barug. However, the Commission on Elections still categorizes them as independents since they filed their certificates of candidacy (COC) as independents.

On November 20, 2021, Hontiveros, as the first councilor of the Cebu City Council, succeeded to the vice mayorship of Cebu City, replacing Mike Rama, who ascended as mayor of Cebu City after the death of Edgardo Labella. In 2022, Hontiveros returned to the council after topping the polls again.

== Personal life ==
Hontiveros is an evangelical, and has a son named Isaiah with singer and fellow Cebu native Gail Blanco. He speaks three languages - his native Cebuano, English and Tagalog. He is also a cousin to Philippine Senator Risa Hontiveros and broadcast journalist Pia Hontiveros.

He has also worn the following numbers during his career: the numbers 7 with Cebu Gems and San Miguel, the number 34 which was his first jersey number with Tanduay, and 24 with Air21, and 25 with Alaska Aces.

== PBA career statistics ==
Legend
GP	Games played	MPG	Minutes per game
FG%	Field-goal percentage	3P%	3-point field-goal percentage	FT%	Free-throw percentage
RPG	Rebounds per game	APG	Assists per game	SPG	Steals per game
BPG	Blocks per game	PPG	Points per game	**Bold**	Career high

=== Season-by-season averages ===
Year	Team	GP	MPG	FG%	3P%	FT%	RPG	APG	SPG	BPG	PPG
2000	Tanduay	44	25.9	.389	.273	.729	2.6	1.6	.5	.2	10.2
2001	Tanduay	38	29.8	.386	**.406**	.646	3.9	1.9	.6	.4	12.4
2002	San Miguel	13	32.5	.413	.333	.632	4.6	2.5	.5	.5	11.9
2003	San Miguel	50	33.3	.417	.368	.831	4.6	2.1	.8	**.7**	12.8
2004–05	San Miguel	**77**	**34.7**	.416	.320	.729	4.4	2.5	1.0	**.7**	12.6
2005–06	San Miguel	42	32.1	.382	.359	.754	4.1	2.0	.9	.5	10.5
2006–07	San Miguel	31	30.5	.346	.310	.739	**4.8**	**3.6**	.7	.3	12.8
2007–08	Magnolia	44	28.9	.415	.314	.778	4.0	2.7	**1.3**	.6	11.7
2008–09	San Miguel	57	29.8	.437	.379	.812	4.5	2.3	.9	.5	**14.8**
2009–10	San Miguel	56	28.4	**.443**	.376	.710	3.4	1.8	.6	.3	11.8
2010–11	San Miguel	49	32.3	.418	.377	.739	4.0	2.0	.9	.4	13.5
2010–11	Air21	49	32.3	.418	.377	.739	4.0	2.0	.9	.4	13.5
2011–12	Petron	9	12.8	.243	.250	.375	2.0	.6	.1	.0	2.9
2012–13	Alaska	55	22.2	.319	.294	.811	2.9	1.6	.4	.3	6.2
2013–14	Alaska	44	21.8	.342	.358	.596	3.0	1.1	.5	.1	6.2
2014–15	Alaska	57	21.3	.359	.343	.758	2.5	1.2	.5	.2	7.6
2015–16	Alaska	57	15.2	.376	.338	**.837**	1.5	.9	.4	.1	5.7
2016–17	Alaska	24	11.9	.284	.299	.500	1.5	.7	.2	.0	3.2
Career		747	26.9	.395	.344	.751	3.5	1.9	.7	.4	10.3

== Electoral history ==
Electoral history of Dondon Hontiveros
Year	Office	Party		Votes received				Result
Year	Office	Local	National	Total	%	P.	Swing	Result
2019	Councilor (Cebu–2nd)	BARUG	PDP–Laban	161,347	8.34%	1st	—N/a	Won
2022	Councilor (Cebu–2nd)	BARUG	IND	191,938	9.02%	1st	+0.68	Won
2025	Vice Mayor of Cebu City	BARUG	PDP	190,586	33.33%	2nd	—N/a	Lost

== See also ==
- List of people from Cebu
- Mayor of Cebu City
- Cebu City Council
