= Renren Ritualo =

Filipino basketball player and coach

La Salle Green Hills Greenies
- Title: Head coach
- League: NCAA

Personal information
- Born: June 14, 1979 (age 47) Quezon City, Philippines
- Listed height: 6 ft 0 in (1.83 m)
- Listed weight: 178 lb (81 kg)

Career information
- High school: San Beda (Manila)
- College: De La Salle (1997–2001)
- PBA draft: 2002: 1st round, 8th overall pick
- Drafted by: FedEx Express
- Playing career: 2002–2014
- Position: Shooting guard / small forward
- Number: 14
- Coaching career: 2015–present

Career history

Playing
- 2002–2006: Air21 Express
- 2006–2010: Talk 'N Text Phone Pals
- 2010: Air21 Express
- 2010–2011: Powerade Tigers
- 2011: Meralco Bolts
- 2011–2014: Shopinas.com Clickers / Air21 Express

Coaching
- 2015–2022: Adamson (assistant)
- 2022–present: La Salle Green Hills
- 2025: De La Salle (men) (assistant)

Career highlights
- As player: PBA champion (2009 Philippine); PBA Rookie of the Year (2002); PBA Mr. Quality Minutes (2003); 2x PBA All-Star (2005–2006); PBA All-Star 3 Point Shootout Champion (2008); 4x UAAP champion (1998, 1999, 2000, 2001); UAAP Rookie of the Year (1997); UAAP Finals Most Valuable Player (2001); 4x UAAP Mythical Five (1997–1999, 2001); No. 4 retired by the De La Salle Green Archers; 3x PBL Champion (1999–2001); PBL Most Valuable Player (2000-01 Challenge); PBL Mythical Five; PBL's 20 Greatest Players; NCAA Juniors Champion (1996); NCAA Juniors Finals MVP (1996); As assistant coach: UAAP champion (2025)

Florendo "Renren" De Ramos Ritualo Jr. (born June 14, 1979) is a Filipino former professional basketball player and current coach of the La Salle Green Hills Greenies. Nicknamed The Rainman, Ritualo was also a one-time member of the Philippine National Team.

He served as the panelist on UAAP coverage in ABS-CBN Sports occasionally and was also a game analyst for Radyo 92.3 News FM.

== Early life ==
Ritualo is the son of former PBA player Florendo Ritualo Sr. and Maria Yasoña de Ramos of Lumban, Laguna. Aside from his father, he also looked up to PBA and NBA greats such as Alvin Patrimonio and Michael Jordan. He first started out as a guard for the San Beda Red Cubs. In his time there, he won a championship and was co-Finals MVP.

== College career ==
Ritualo chose not to play for San Beda in college, choosing instead to play for the De La Salle Green Archers. He was also recruited by UP. He first played for La Salle in 1997. He earned Rookie of the Year honors as he became known for his ability to shoot beyond the arc. The Archers lost to the FEU Tamaraws in the Finals.

In 1998, La Salle hired Franz Pumaren, a former Green Archer and 12-year PBA veteran, to be its new head coach. Their roster lost MVP Mark Telan, but had players such as Dino Aldeguer, Don Allado, Alvin Castro, Willy Wilson, and Francis Zamora, who would play key roles for that team's title run. That season, the Archers had a 13–1 record in the elimination round, eventually beating the Tamaraws for Ritualo's first UAAP championship. It was also La Salle's first championship since 1990.

In 1999, Ritualo scored 33 points against UST. They made it to the Finals, where they played the UST Growling Tigers. The Archers lost Game 1, as Aldeguer took a three-point shot that should have been for Ritualo. In Game 2, the Archers bounced back behind clutch free throws from Mac Cuan, forcing a do-or-die game. In Game 3, Aldeguer made a three-pointer while he was fouled from the same play in Game 1, eventually sending the game into overtime. The Archers won in the overtime period, making them champions for 1999.

In 2000, despite having a weaker roster, La Salle still won the championship. They swept FEU in the Finals. Ritualo didn't make the Mythical Five that year as he had a hand injury, which would be the only time he didn't make it in his UAAP career.

Ritualo scored 33 points against Ateneo in the opener for the 2001 season. He also won his last championship against Ateneo that season.

He became the third La Sallian player to have his jersey retired after basketball greats such as Lim Eng Beng and Kurt Bachmann. In 2021, he was also inducted into the De La Salle Sports Hall of Fame.

== Philippine Basketball League ==
During his UAAP stint, Ritualo signed up with Tanduay in the Philippine Basketball League (PBL) in 1998 in a limited role for the team as the Centennial Rhum Masters took a runner-up finish in the 2nd Yakult PBL Centennial Cup tournament. After Tanduay left the PBL, Ritualo was the key player for Tanduay's Colt 45 team in the 1999 PBL Challenge Cup, when the team placed third in the tournament.

After Colt45 decided to leave the league, Ritualo joined Welcoat Paints in late 1999. Ritualo led Welcoat to three PBL titles from 1999 to 2001 before jumping to the PBA.

In 2003, Ritualo was named as one of PBL's Greatest Players of All-time.

=== Accomplishments ===
- PBL Mythical Five
- PBL Most Valuable Player
- PBL Champion (1999, 2000, 2001)
- Member of the PBL's 20 Greatest Players

== Philippine Basketball Association ==
=== FedEx/Air21 Express ===
Ritualo was selected as the eight overall pick in the 2002 PBA draft by expansion team FedEx Express. But before Ritualo was set to join FedEx, he was part of the RP National Training Pool for the 2002 Busan Asian Games. Ritualo was cut from the national team and returned to his mother team.

He had a strong rookie season for FedEx, leading the league in three-pointers made. By season's end, he was named as the 2002 PBA Rookie of the Year. He was also named Mr. Quality Minutes the following year.

In 2005, he also took part in the three-point shoot-out, earning 2nd place as he lost to Jimmy Alapag. He also participated in that year's All-Star game, as a member of the North All-Stars. On April 29 of that year, he made 9 threes in one quarter in FedEx's 116–106 victory over Red Bull Barako, tying a record he shared with Allan Caidic.

Ritualo recorded a 40-point output against Purefoods on January 27, 2006, during Game Three of the Fiesta Conference Semi-finals series, held in the Ynares Sports Complex. Ritualo led Air21 to a third-place finish, the highest in franchise history during that time before the team captured a runner-up finish against the Barangay Ginebra Kings in 2008. He was also in the running for Best Player of the Conference, losing to Enrico Villanueva. He was also an All-Star for the 2006 edition in Cagayan de Oro.

Ritualo was also the first local player in PBA history to have four games in a career with at least eight three-pointers in each of those games.

=== Talk 'N Text Phone Pals ===
On May 8, 2006, Ritualo, along with Patrick Fran, was traded from Air21 to the Talk 'N Text Phone Pals in exchange for Leo Avenido and two future first round draft picks, which were used in 2007 and 2008.

With Ritualo's addition, as well as the trade that sent Alaska Aces slotman Don Allado to the Phone Pals for Willie Miller, John Ferriols & a future pick, the Phone Pals were considered one of the deepest lineups in the 2006 Philippine Cup. However, the Phone Pals never made it past the wildcard phase, ending their season. During the 2007 Philippine Cup, he averaged 13.83 points per game in the 18 games of the elimination round.

In the 2008 All-Star Weekend, Ritualo won his only 3-Point Shootout.

In the 2008–09 Philippine Cup, Ritualo got his much awaited 1st PBA title against the Alaska Aces. Though winning championships seemed so easy for him during the amateur ranks, it took him 7 years in the PBA to win a championship.

=== Return to the Air21 Express ===
During the off-season of the 2010 Fiesta Conference, he was traded back to the Air21 Express along with Yancy de Ocampo for J.R. Quiñahan and Aaron Aban.

=== Powerade Tigers ===
After playing for the Express, he was acquired by the Powerade Tigers during the off-season. He only had limited minutes during the Philippine Cup.

=== Meralco Bolts ===
The Meralco Bolts signed up Ritualo after the Powerade Tigers released him to the free agency pool during the Philippine Cup off-season. At the end of the 2010–11 PBA season, he was waived by the team.

=== Reunion With Franz Pumaren ===
After being waived by Meralco, he was acquired by then newly formed Shopinas.com Clickers during the off-season of 2011. He played once again under his former collegiate mentor Franz Pumaren. In 2012, he scored 22 points on 6-of-6 shooting from three as the team scored 128 points in the win against Powerade. That was the most points the Shopinas.com/Air21 franchise had scored in franchise history. He also tied the record for most threes made without missing. The record would stand until San Miguel Beermen wing Von Pessumal made 8 straight threes during the 2019 Commissioner's Cup.

=== Alaska Aces ===
Air21 Express released Ritualo and he was picked up by the Alaska Aces. However, he was not included in the lineup for the 2013–14 season.

=== Accomplishments ===
- 2002 PBA Rookie of the Year
- 2003 PBA Sixth Man of the Year
- 2005-2006 PBA All-Star
- 2008 PBA All-Star 3 Point Shootout Champion
- PBA 500 Three-Points Club Member
- 1st local player in PBA history to have 4 games with at least 8 treys in each of those games

== Team Pilipinas ==
In 2005, Ritualo was a member of the RP National Training Pool. Ritualo was part of the Team Pilipinas squad in the 2005 FIBA-Asia Champions Cup with the host squad placing fifth in the eight nation tournament. During a match against Sagesse of Lebanon, Ritualo's numerous three-pointers in the second half, sparked a short-lived comeback by the Filipinos before losing 100–90.

Ritualo was also included in the Team Pilipinas squad for the Global Hoops Summit in Las Vegas, Nevada. During one game, Ritualo drained nine triples in a loss to Passive Lane Sports, which had God Shammgod. It is said that these during these games, NBA teams such as the New Jersey Nets and Philadelphia 76ers were scouting him. However, no offers were made to Ritualo during this time, shutting down those rumors.

Ritualo was a member of Team Pilipinas' successful championship in the 5th Sultan's Cup in Bandar Seri Begawan, Brunei Darussalam.

In 2006, Ritualo scored 17 points as Team Pilipinas defeated the American squad led by former NBA star Dennis Rodman, 110–102 on May 1 at the Araneta Coliseum.

The following year, he was part of the team that competed at the 2007 FIBA Asia Championships.

== Broadcast career ==
After retiring, Ritualo later appeared on Radyo5 92.3 News FM as a panelist, analyst and commentator in some games alongside Jolly Escobar, Carlo Pamintuan and other courtside commentators.

He also covered UAAP and NCAA games for ABS-CBN Sports.

== Coaching career ==
Ritualo first became a shooting coach for the Mahindra Enforcers. He was then invited by his former coach in Pumaren to join him on the Adamson Falcons coaching staff. He accepted the offer and has held the position since 2015.

On June 29, 2022, Ritualo was announced as the head coach of the La Salle Green Hills Greenies. In 2025, while still handling the Greenies, he was brought in as a shooting coach for the DLSU Green Archers to help them with their free throw shooting. In his first season with the team, the Green Archers won the championship.

== PBA career statistics ==
Legend
| GP | Games played | MPG | Minutes per game |
| FG% | Field-goal percentage | 3P% | 3-point field-goal percentage | FT% | Free-throw percentage |
| RPG | Rebounds per game | APG | Assists per game | SPG | Steals per game |
| BPG | Blocks per game | PPG | Points per game | **Bold** | Career high |

=== Season ===
| Year | Team | GP | MPG | FG% | 3P% | FT% | RPG | APG | SPG | BPG | PPG |
|---|---|---|---|---|---|---|---|---|---|---|---|
| 2002 | FedEx | 22 | 27.8 | .354 | .333 | .938 | 1.5 | 1.5 | .8 | .05 | 12.4 |
| 2003 | FedEx | 42 | 20.8 | .380 | .350 | .871 | 1.9 | 1.1 | .7 | .02 | 11.3 |
| 2004–05 | FedEx | **59** | 30.3 | .355 | .322 | .839 | 1.9 | 1.7 | **.9** | **.2** | 16.4 |
| 2005–06 | Air21/Talk 'N Text | 51 | **37.6** | .360 | .302 | .829 | **2.8** | **2.4** | .7 | .1 | **18.2** |
| 2006-07 | Talk 'N Text | 29 | 28.8 | .371 | .322 | .842 | 1.6 | 1.9 | .8 | .1 | 14.3 |
| 2007-08 | Talk 'N Text | 39 | 23.3 | .402 | .368 | .898 | 2.3 | 1.5 | .8 | .1 | 11.8 |
| 2008–09 | Talk 'N Text | 45 | 15.5 | .379 | .320 | .743 | 1.5 | .8 | .3 | .1 | 7.1 |
| 2009–10 | Talk 'N Text/Air21 | 41 | 18.8 | .366 | .302 | .762 | 1.3 | 1.0 | .3 | .05 | 6.6 |
| 2010–11 | Powerade/Meralco | 29 | 13.0 | .376 | .293 | .550 | 1.1 | .9 | .2 | .1 | 4.6 |
| 2011-12 | Shopinas.com/Air21 | 32 | 21.6 | .387 | **.382** | .732 | 1.4 | 1.3 | .4 | .1 | 9.1 |
| 2012–13 | Air21 | 32 | 10.7 | .349 | .250 | .941 | 1.0 | .7 | .1 | .03 | 3.3 |
| 2013–14 | Air21 | 8 | 12.6 | **.414** | .368 | **1.00** | .6 | .6 | .2 | 0 | 4.6 |
| Career | | 429 | 23.1 | .369 | .327 | .829 | 1.7 | 1.4 | .6 | .1 | 10.9 |

== Acting career ==
Ritualo was a cameo in 2002 comedy film Home Along da Riber starring Dolphy, as a Air21 deliveryman.

== Political career ==
In the 2025 Philippine elections in Metro Manila, Ritualo filed his COC for San Juan's 1st councilor district. The High Tribunal issued a TRO in his favor against the Comelec disqualification order.
