= Homer Se =

Filipino basketball player (born 1977)

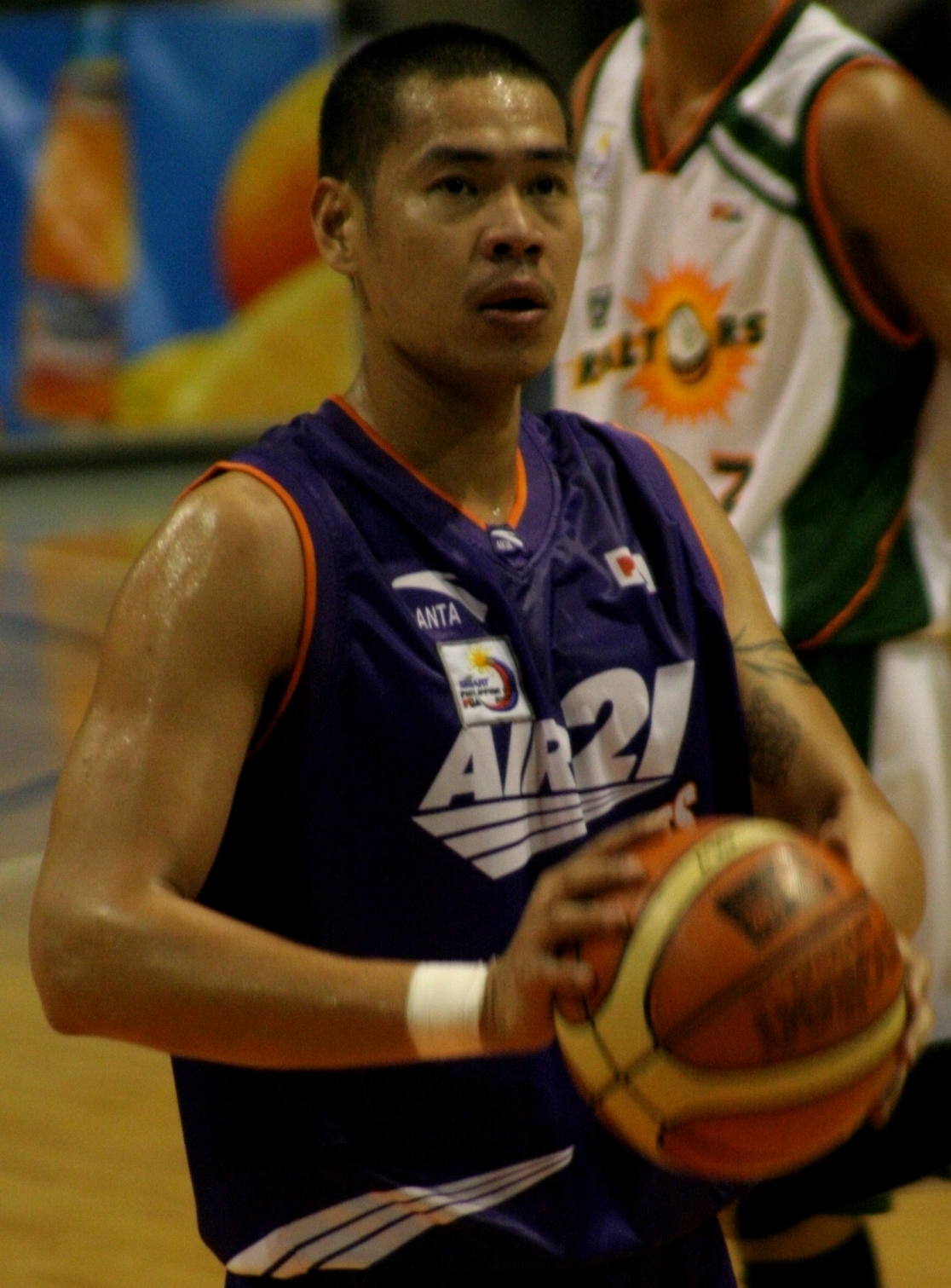
- Se in 2007

Personal information
- Born: May 5, 1977 (age 49) Albay, Philippines
- Listed height: 6 ft 6 in (1.98 m)
- Listed weight: 220 lb (100 kg)

Career information
- College: San Sebastian
- PBA draft: 2002: 1st round, 5th overall pick
- Drafted by: Red Bull Barako
- Playing career: 2002–2012
- Position: Center / power forward

Career history
- 2002–2004: Red Bull Barako
- 2004–2009: Air21 Express
- 2009: Barangay Ginebra Kings
- 2011–2012: Shopinas.com Clickers

Homer Se (born May 5, 1977) is a Filipino former professional basketball player of the Philippine Basketball Association (PBA).

== Player profile ==
Se is a tough, physical, and aggressive player who never backs down. He is known for collecting excessive technical fouls due to his rough playing style. In 2008, he was ejected from a match with the Singapore Slingers for kicking opposing player Eric Sandrin in the head in response to Sandrin's trash-talking.

The 6-6 former stalwart of San Sebastian College - Recoletos failed to continue the Stags’ reign in the NCAA after his team lost to the Letran Knights.

He then join the Metropolitan Basketball Association, but the league was on its last remaining years before closing down permanently. After his short stint in the MBA, he then went to the Philippine Basketball Association and was picked by Red Bull as the 5th overall in 2002. He won a championship with Red Bull after being traded to Air21.

He was then traded to Ginebra alongside Cyrus Baguio in exchange for 2012 and 2013 future picks. At the end of the 2009 PBA Fiesta Conference, he was waived by the Gin Kings.

Se played for the Shopinas.com Clickers in an attempt to return to the PBA, but due to an injury, he had to retire once more.

== PBA career statistics ==
Legend
GP	Games played	MPG	Minutes per game
FG%	Field-goal percentage	3P%	3-point field-goal percentage	FT%	Free-throw percentage
RPG	Rebounds per game	APG	Assists per game	SPG	Steals per game
BPG	Blocks per game	PPG	Points per game	**Bold**	Career high

=== Season-by-season averages ===
Year	Team	GP	MPG	FG%	3P%	FT%	RPG	APG	SPG	BPG	PPG
2002	Red Bull	20	8.7	.370	.000	.400	2.8	.4	.2	.4	3.2
2003	Red Bull	41	16.0	.506	.000	.514	4.1	.9	.2	.1	6.7
2004–05	Red Bull	**57**	12.3	.462	.000	**.643**	3.4	.6	.2	.2	5.7
2004–05	FedEx	**57**	12.3	.462	.000	**.643**	3.4	.6	.2	.2	5.7
2005–06	Air21	50	6.9	.400	.000	.571	1.6	.3	.1	.1	2.6
2006–07	Air21	28	14.4	.457	.000	.553	3.6	.6	.3	.2	5.5
2007–08	Air21	50	**23.3**	.464	.000	.591	**6.8**	**1.3**	.5	.4	**9.0**
2008–09	Air21	14	16.6	**.510**	**.133**	.552	3.7	.8	**.9**	**.6**	8.4
2008–09	Barangay Ginebra	14	16.6	**.510**	**.133**	.552	3.7	.8	**.9**	**.6**	8.4
2011–12	Shopinas.com	13	8.9	.333	—	.375	3.2	.5	.0	.2	2.1
Career		273	13.9	.458	.087	.568	3.8	.7	.3	.2	5.6
