= 2005 PBA Fiesta Conference =

Philippine basketball tournament

- Duration: March 4 – July 10, 2005
- TV partner(s): ABC

Finals
- Champions: San Miguel Beermen
- Runners-up: Talk 'N Text Phone Pals

Awards
- Best Player: Willie Miller (Talk 'N Text Phone Pals)
- Best Import: Jerald Honeycutt (Talk 'N Text Phone Pals)
- Finals MVP: Danny Ildefonso (San Miguel Beermen)

PBA Fiesta Conference chronology
- < 2004 2005–06 >

PBA conference chronology
- < 2004–05 Philippine 2005–06 Fiesta >

The 2005 PBA Fiesta Conference was the 2004–05 season's PBA Fiesta Conference of the Philippine Basketball Association. It was the second-staging of the Fiesta Conference.

The Shell Turbo Chargers won third place over Red Bull Barako in a one-game playoff. It was the last appearance of the Turbo Chargers in the league as it filed a leave of absence in August 2005, eventually selling their rights to Welcoat.

The league finally allowed Asi Taulava to play in the finals series (who was indefinitely suspended) but still lost to the veteran-laided Beermen.

Talk N' Text's Willie Miller was named the Best Player of the Conference while teammate Jerald Honeycutt won the Best Import plum.

The San Miguel Beermen won its 17th PBA title with a 4–1 series victory over Talk 'N Text Phone Pals in the finals.

== List of imports ==
Name	Team	Debuted
Leon Derricks	Alaska Aces	March 4 vs. San Miguel
Eddie Elisma	Barangay Ginebra Kings	March 6 vs. Red Bull
Jaja Richards	Coca-Cola Tigers	March 4 vs. Sta.Lucia
Anthony Miller	FedEx Express	March 6 vs. Purefoods
Antonio Smith	Purefoods Tender Juicy Hotdogs	March 6 vs. FedEx
Dalron Johnson	Red Bull Barako	March 6 vs. Barangay Ginebra
Chris Burgess	San Miguel Beermen	March 4 vs. Alaska
Wesley Wilson	Shell Turbo Chargers	March 6 vs. Talk 'N Text
Richard Jeter	Sta. Lucia Realtors	March 4 vs. Coca-Cola
Jerald Honeycutt	Talk 'N Text Phone Pals	March 6 vs. Shell
Dickey Simpkins	Alaska Aces	March 31 vs. Talk 'N Text
Andre Brown	Barangay Ginebra Kings	April 29 vs. Alaska
Bakari Hendrix	Coca-Cola Tigers	March 30 vs. Shell
Lorenzo Coleman	Purefoods Tender Juicy Hotdogs	May 4 vs. Coca-Cola
Earl Barron	Red Bull Barako	May 13 vs. Purefoods
Tommy Smith	San Miguel Beermen	May 27 vs. FedEx
Melvin Robinson	Shell Turbo Chargers	April 28 vs. Purefoods
Raheim Brown	Sta. Lucia Realtors	March 9 vs. Alaska
Earl Ike	Talk 'N Text Phone Pals	March 13 vs. Sta.Lucia
Hiram Fuller	Barangay Ginebra Kings	May 27 vs Talk 'N Text
Darrell Johns	Coca-Cola Tigers	April 8 vs. Red Bull
Marcus Melvin	Purefoods Tender Juicy Hotdogs	June 9 vs. FedEx (WC)
Ace Custis	San Miguel Beermen	June 24 vs. Red Bull (SF Game 3)
Ajani Williams	Shell Turbo Chargers	May 13 vs Talk 'N Text
Ryan Fletcher	Sta. Lucia Realtors	April 6 vs. Barangay Ginebra
Noel Felix	Talk 'N Text Phone Pals	March 31 vs. Alaska
Mark Sanford	Coca-Cola Tigers	April 28 vs. San Miguel

Jerald Honeycutt played for TNT in their first game and was replaced by Earl Ike (two games). He returned on April 15 vs. Purefoods, replacing Noel Felix (three games) and played for the rest of the conference.

Chris Burgess played 17 games in the Classification round and was replaced by Tommy Smith in the Beermen's last game. Burgess returned in the first two games of the semifinal series vs Red Bull before being replaced by Ace Custis.

== Classification round ==
=== Team standings ===
Pos	Team	W	L	PCT	GB	Qualification
1	Talk 'N Text Phone Pals	12	6	.667	—	Advance to semifinals
2	San Miguel Beermen	11	7	.611 (Note: Second-seed playoff: San Miguel 73–71 Alaska)	1	Advance to semifinals
3	Alaska Aces	11	7	.611	1	Twice-to-beat in wildcard phase
4	Sta. Lucia Realtors	10	8	.556	2	Twice-to-beat in wildcard phase
5	FedEx Express	9	9	.500 (Note: Head-to-head differential: FedEx +15, Red Bull −15)	3	Best-of-three wildcard phase
6	Red Bull Thunder	9	9	.500	3	Best-of-three wildcard phase
7	Barangay Ginebra Kings	8	10	.444	4	Best-of-three wildcard phase
8	Purefoods TJ Hotdogs	7	11	.389 (Note: Head-to-head differential: Purefoods +6, Shell −6)	5	Best-of-three wildcard phase
9	Shell Turbo Chargers	7	11	.389	5	Twice-to-win in wildcard phase
10	Coca-Cola Tigers	6	12	.333	6	Twice-to-win in wildcard phase

Source: PBA.ph

== Second seed playoff ==
ABC

June 8

San Miguel Beermen 73, Alaska Aces 71

Araneta Coliseum, Quezon City

== Bracket ==
Wildcard phase
(#4 twice-to-beat)
4	Sta. Lucia	74	85
9	Shell	85	87
(Best-of-3)
5	FedEx	1
8	Purefoods	2
(#3 twice-to-beat)
3	Alaska	86
10	Coca-Cola	66
(Best-of-3)
6	Red Bull	2
7	Barangay Ginebra	0

Quarterfinals (Best-of-3)
9	Shell	2
8	Purefoods	0
3	Alaska	1
6	Red Bull	2

Semifinals (Best-of-5)
1	Talk 'N Text	3
9	Shell	1
2	San Miguel	3
6	Red Bull	1

Finals (Best-of-7)
1	Talk 'N Text	1
2	San Miguel	4
Third place playoff
9	Shell	102
6	Red Bull	86

== Wildcard playoffs ==
The #3 vs. #10 and the #4 vs. #9 matchups are in the "twice-to-beat" format; the team with the higher seed only needs to win once to advance, but needs to be beaten twice in order to be eliminated. The other two matchups are a best-of-three series.

=== (3) Alaska vs. (10) Coca-Cola ===
ABC

June 10

Alaska Aces 86, Coca-Cola Tigers 66
Alaska advances to the quarterfinals

Araneta Coliseum, Quezon City

=== (4) Sta. Lucia vs. (9) Shell ===
ABC

June 10

recap

Sta. Lucia Realtors 74, Shell Turbo Chargers 85

Araneta Coliseum, Quezon City

ABC

June 12

Sta. Lucia Realtors 85, Shell Turbo Chargers 87
Shell advances to the quarterfinals

Araneta Coliseum, Quezon City

=== (5) FedEx vs. (8) Purefoods ===
ABC

June 9

FedEx Express 87, Purefoods TJ Hotdogs 98

Ynares Center, Antipolo

ABC

June 11

FedEx Express 99, Purefoods TJ Hotdogs 89

Ynares Center, Antipolo

ABC

June 12

FedEx Express 86, Purefoods TJ Hotdogs 94
Purefoods wins series, 2–1

Araneta Coliseum, Quezon City

=== (6) Red Bull vs. (7) Barangay Ginebra ===
ABC

June 9

Red Bull Barako 99, Barangay Ginebra Kings 84

Ynares Center, Antipolo

ABC

June 11

recap

Red Bull Barako 90, Barangay Ginebra Kings 89
Red Bull wins series, 2–0

Ynares Center, Antipolo

== Quarterfinals ==
=== (3) Alaska vs. (6) Red Bull ===
ABC

June 15

Alaska Aces 89, Red Bull Barako 80

Araneta Coliseum, Quezon City

ABC

June 16

boxscores

Alaska Aces 71, Red Bull Barako 84

Ynares Center, Antipolo

ABC

June 17

boxscores

Alaska Aces 86, Red Bull Barako 87
Red Bull wins series, 2–1

Araneta Coliseum, Quezon City

=== (8) Shell vs. (9) Purefoods ===
ABC

June 15

Shell Turbo Chargers 86, Purefoods TJ Hotdogs 79

Araneta Coliseum, Quezon City

ABC

June 16

Shell Turbo Chargers 87, Purefoods TJ Hotdogs 80
Shell wins series, 2–0

Ynares Center, Antipolo

== Semifinals ==
=== (1) Talk 'N Text vs. (9) Shell ===
ABC

June 19

boxscores

Talk 'N Text Phone Pals 97, Shell Turbo Chargers 74

Araneta Coliseum, Quezon City

ABC

June 22

Talk 'N Text Phone Pals 92, Shell Turbo Chargers 94

Araneta Coliseum, Quezon City

ABC

June 24

boxscores

Talk 'N Text Phone Pals 91, Shell Turbo Chargers 78

Cuneta Astrodome, Pasay

ABC

June 26

Talk 'N Text Phone Pals 96, Shell Turbo Chargers 91
Talk 'N Text wins series, 3–1

Araneta Coliseum, Quezon City

=== (2) San Miguel vs. (6) Red Bull ===
ABC

June 19

San Miguel Beermen 89, Red Bull Barako 81

Araneta Coliseum, Quezon City

ABC

June 22

boxscores

San Miguel Beermen 77, Red Bull Barako 79

Araneta Coliseum, Quezon City

ABC

June 24

San Miguel Beermen 80, Red Bull Barako 70

Cuneta Astrodome, Pasay

ABC

June 26

boxscores

San Miguel Beermen 88, Red Bull Barako 86
San Miguel wins series, 3–1

Araneta Coliseum, Quezon City

== Third place playoff ==
ABC

July 1

Red Bull Barako 86, Shell Turbo Chargers 102

Araneta Coliseum, Quezon City

== Finals ==
2005 PBA Fiesta Conference finals
Team	Coach	Wins
San Miguel Beermen	Jong Uichico	4
Talk 'N Text Phone Pals	Joel Banal	1
- Dates: July 1–10, 2005
- MVP: Danny Ildefonso
- Television: ABC

PBA Fiesta Conference finals chronology
- < 2004 2005–06 >

PBA finals chronology
- < 2004–05 Philippine 2005–06 Fiesta >

The 2005 Philippine Basketball Association (PBA) Fiesta Conference finals was the best-of-7 basketball championship series of the 2005 PBA Fiesta Conference, and the conclusion of the conference's playoffs. Barangay Ginebra Kings and Red Bull Barako played for the 89th championship contested by the league.

The San Miguel Beermen won their 17th league championship with a 4–1 series victory over Talk 'N Text Phone Pals.

Danny Ildefonso was named Finals MVP.

=== Games ===
ABC

July 1

boxscores

Talk 'N Text Phone Pals 66, San Miguel Beermen 74

Araneta Coliseum, Quezon City

ABC

July 3

boxscores

Talk 'N Text Phone Pals 79, San Miguel Beermen 81

Araneta Coliseum, Quezon City

ABC

July 6

boxscores

Talk 'N Text Phone Pals 103, San Miguel Beermen 77

Araneta Coliseum, Quezon City

ABC

July 8

boxscores

Talk 'N Text Phone Pals 82, San Miguel Beermen 87

Araneta Coliseum, Quezon City

ABC

July 10

Talk 'N Text Phone Pals 87, San Miguel Beermen 91
San Miguel wins series, 4–1

Cuneta Astrodome, Pasay
