= Bonnie Garcia (coach) =

Filipino basketball coach

- Coaching career: 1997–present

Career history

Coaching
- 1997–2001: Manuel L. Quezon University
- 1998: Laguna Lakers
- 2000: Pampanga Dragons
- 2001: Laguna Lakers
- 2001–2006: AMA University
- 2002–2003: FedEx Express (assistant)
- 2003–2004: FedEx Express
- 2007–2011: San Beda (assistant)
- 2012–2018: Mapúa (assistant)
- 2015–2018: Colegio de San Lorenzo
- 2018–2021: UST (assistant)
- 2018–2020: UST Tiger Cubs
- 2023-2024: Negros Muscovados

Career highlights
- As head coach: 2× UCBL champions (2006, 2017); As assistant coach: 4× NCAA seniors' champion (2007, 2008, 2010, 2011)

Bonifacio "Bonnie" Garcia is a Filipino basketball coach.

== Coaching career ==
Garcia started his career at Manuel L. Quezon University Pythons varsity basketball team. Later, he served as head coach of AMA University and won a championship with them in 2006. While he was at Pythons and AMA, he served as head coach for the Laguna Lakers in 1998 and 2001, and for Pampanga Dragons in 2000. He became the team consultant for the FedEx Express team in the PBA before becoming appointed as head coach in 2003 and served until 2004.

He was an assistant coach of the Mapúa Cardinals under Atoy Co, and the San Beda Red Lions under Frankie Lim. He was also the head coach of the Sta. Lucia basketball team in the PCBL in 2015.

He led the Colegio de San Lorenzo Griffins to the 2017 UCBL and NCR-UCLAA championships.

He later served as an assistant to Aldin Ayo for UST Growling Tigers, and later as interim head coach for its high school team. He served as an interim for the high school team until 2020, replaced by Jinino Manansala.
