= Bong Ramos =

Filipino basketball coach

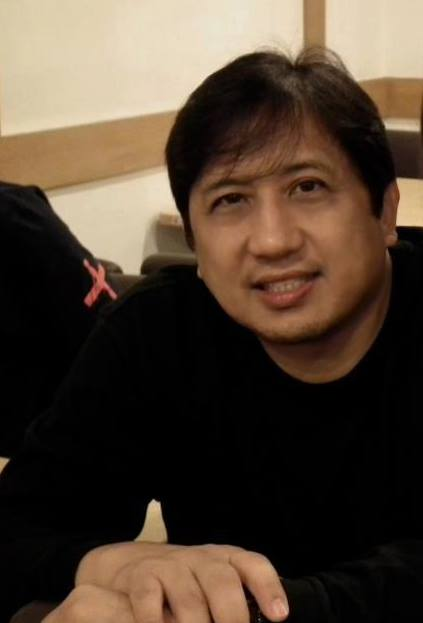

Mindoro Tamaraws
- Position: Assistant coach
- League: MPBL

Personal information
- Born: January 20, 1961 (age 65)

Career information
- High school: Mapúa (Manila)
- College: Mapúa
- Coaching career: 1997–present

Career history

Coaching
- 1997–1998: Mapúa
- 1998–1999: Batangas Blades
- 2000: Manila Metrostars (assistant)
- 2001: Laguna Lakers (assistant)
- 2002–2003: Philippines (assistant)
- 2002: Barangay Ginebra Kings (assistant)
- 2002–2003: Aspac Texmaco
- 2003: Indonesia
- 2003: Hewlette-Packard Aspac
- 2004: Hewlette-Packard Aspac (consultant)
- 2005: FedEx Express
- 2005–2008: Talk 'N Text Phone Pals (assistant)
- 2008–2009: CLS Knights
- 2009: Garuda Flexi Bandung
- 2009–2010: Brunei Barracudas
- 2011: Air21 Express
- 2011–2012: Barako Bull Energy (assistant)
- 2012–2014: Barako Bull Energy
- 2015–2018: Blackwater Elite (assistant)
- 2017–2018: Stapac Jakarta
- 2018–2019: Blackwater Elite
- 2019–2020: Pampanga Giant Lanterns
- 2023–2024: Quezon City Toda Aksyon / Galeries Taipan (assistant)
- 2025: Zamboanga Sikat
- 2026–present: Mindoro Tamaraws (assistant)
Medals
Men's basketball
Assistant coach for Philippines
SEABA Champions Cup
Gold medal – first place	2000 Johor	Team

Geraldo "Bong" Ramos (born January 20, 1961) is a Filipino professional basketball coach who serves as an assistant coach for the Mindoro Tamaraws in the Maharlika Pilipinas Basketball League (MPBL).

He had previously coached teams in the Philippine Basketball Association (PBA), ASEAN Basketball League (ABL), Indonesian Basketball League (IBL), Southeast Asian Games (SEA Games), Southeast Asia Basketball Association (SEABA), Maharlika Pilipinas Basketball League (MPBL), Metropolitan Basketball Association (MBA), and the National Collegiate Athletic Association (NCAA).

== Playing career ==
Ramos played point guard for teams in the Indonesian basketball circuit, the Philippine Amateur Basketball League (PABL), National Collegiate Athletic Association (NCAA), and the Philippine National Team.

He is notable as a player for the champion Mapua Cardinals in the NCAA in 1981, named Mythical 5 and Over-all Top Scorer.

He played for the Philippines under Coach Ron Jacobs in 1982-1983 with the Northern Consolidated National Team.

He was team captain of the ESQ Pasig Giants who emerged champions in the Asian Inter-city Basketball Tournament in Jakarta, Indonesia where he was spotted and hired as an import for the Indonesian team Pelita Jaya from 1988-1991, possibly being the first ever Filipino basketball player import. He was named Best Guard at the Pangdam Tanjangpura Cup I in 1988 in Indonesia.

- 1978 - 1979 Point Guard - Mapua Red Robins (HS NCAA)
- 1980 - 1982 Point Guard - The Mapua Cardinals (NCAA)
  - Co-Captain, NCAA 1981 Champion
  - Team Captain, NCAA 1982 Runner Up
- 1981 - 1982 Co-Captain, Point Guard - Philippine National Youth Team to the ASEAN School Youth
- 1982 - 1983 Point Guard, Northern Consolidated National Team or NCC
- 1983 Point Guard - National Team Bank of Rizal (Philippine Amateur Basketball League PABL, Malaysia)
- 1984 Point Guard - Magnolia (PABL)
- 1985 Co-Captain, Point Guard - Lagerlite (PABL)
  - Runner up, PABL 1985
- 1986 Team Captain/Point Guard - ESQ Pasig Giants (PABL)
- 1986 Point Guard - ASEAN Intercity Basketball Tournament in Jakarta, Indonesia
  - Champion
- 1986 - 1987 Team Captain/Point Guard - Purefoods (PABL)
  - Third place, PABL 1987
- 1988 -1991 Player (Import), assistant coach - Pelita Jaya Basketball Team (Jakarta, Indonesia)
- 1991 Point Guard - RC Cola (Philippine Basketball League PBL)

== Coaching career ==
When imports were banned in Indonesia, Ramos became the assistant coach for Pelita Jaya. He returned to Manila in 1991 to play but sustained a leg injury while training with RC Cola in the Philippine Basketball League when a player accidentally fell on his leg during a tune-up game.

Because of his injury, Bong threw in the towel as a player at the age of 30 and worked as an account manager for Ivy League Workwear Shoes for 5 years.

In 1997, Ramos returned to basketball as the head coach of the Mapua Cardinals in the NCAA.

In 1998, Ramos started his professional coaching as head coach of the Batangas Blades career in the MBA (Metropolitan Basketball Association).

Ramos coached the Indonesian team ASPAC-Texmaco to win its three-peat and quadruple championships in 2002 and 2003 in the emerging Indonesian basketball scene. He was named 2003 Coach of the Year of the Indonesian Basketball League. In 2003, Filipino sports headlines reported that the Philippine team got a scare when they almost lost to Indonesia in the 2003 SEA Games, after coaching under the Filipino coach. Ramos previously coached FedEx Express from 2004 to 2005. The former Mapua Cardinal’s coaching resume also includes a stint as the Brunei Barracudas' coach in the Asean Basketball League (ABL). He actually coached Barako Bull before when it was still carrying the Air21 brand name in 2011. On April 30, 2018, Ramos was appointed by the Blackwater Elite to replace former head coach Leo Isaac after leading the team to a poor 0-3 in the 2018 PBA Commissioner's Cup.

== Awards and Distinctions ==
- Coach of the Year, Indonesian Basketball League, 2003
- All-Star Winning Coach, Indonesian Basketball League, 2003
- Best Point Guard in the Pangdam Tanjangpura Cup I while playing as an import for Pelita Jaya in Jakarta, Indonesia, 1988
- Mythical 5 and Over-all Top Scorer in the NCAA in while playing for the Mapua Cardinals, 1982
- Over-all Top Scorer in the NCAA while playing for the Mapua Cardinals, 1981
- PBA All-Star Winning Coach 2005, Sophomore Team in Laoag, Ilocos Norte

== Career records ==
=== PBA ===
Team	Season	Conference	Elims./Clas. round					Playoffs				
Team	Season	Conference	GP	W	L	PCT	Finish	PG	W	L	PCT	Result
Air21	2010–11	Commissioner's Cup	9	5	4	.556	4th	6	2	4	.333	Lost in the Semifinals
Air21	2010–11	Governors' Cup	8	0	8	.000	9th	—	—	—	—	Missed Playoffs
Barako Bull	2012–13	Philippine Cup	14	4	10	.286	9th	—	—	—	—	Missed Playoffs
Barako Bull	2012–13	Commissioner's Cup	14	5	9	.357	9th	—	—	—	—	Missed Playoffs
Barako Bull	2012–13	Governors' Cup	9	4	5	.444	6th	1	0	1	.000	Lost in the Quarterfinals
Barako Bull	2013–14	Philippine Cup	14	5	9	.357	6th	2	0	2	.000	Lost in the Quarterfinals
Barako Bull	2013–14	Commissioner's Cup	9	2	7	.222	9th	—	—	—	—	Missed Playoffs
Blackwater	2017–18	Commissioner's Cup	9	1	8	.111	12th	—	—	—	—	Missed Playoffs
Blackwater	2017–18	Governors' Cup	11	7	4	.636	5th	1	0	1	.000	Lost in the Quarterfinals
Blackwater	2019	Philippine Cup	11	2	9	.182	12th	—	—	—	—	Missed Playoffs
Career Total			108	35	73	.324	Playoff Total	10	2	8	.200	0 PBA championship
