= Tommy Smith (basketball) =

American basketball player

Personal information
- Born: December 4, 1980 (age 45) Phoenix, Arizona, U.S.
- Listed height: 7 ft 0 in (2.13 m)
- Listed weight: 215 lb (98 kg)

Career information
- High school: North (Phoenix Arizona)
- College: Arizona State (1999–2003)
- NBA draft: 2003: 2nd round, 53rd overall pick
- Drafted by: Chicago Bulls
- Playing career: 2003–2015
- Position: Power forward

Career history
- 2003–2004: KK Split
- 2004–2005: Chicago Bulls
- 2005: Yakima SunKings
- 2005: CDP Domingo Paulino Santiago
- 2005–2007: San Miguel Beermen
- 2007–2008: Al-Jalaa SC
- 2008: Artland Dragons
- 2011–2012: Liaoning Hunters
- 2013: Dakota Wizards
- 2013: Leones de Santo Domingo
- 2014–2015: Alliance-Tech Hartsaga

Career highlights
- MNBA champion (2015); ABA blocks leaders (2004)
- Stats at Basketball Reference

Tommy Lee Smith Jr. (born December 4, 1980) is an American former professional basketball player. He played his college basketball at Arizona State University. A 7'0" and 215 lb power forward, Smith attended North High School and was selected in the second round of the 2003 NBA draft by the Chicago Bulls.

A highlight of the 2002–03 season was a 16-rebound, 6-block performance in an 89–57 win over Washington on January 9, 2003.

On December 28, 2011, he was acquired by the Dakota Wizards.

On January 17, 2013, he was acquired by the Fort Wayne Mad Ants.

Smith competes for the Ants Alumni in The Basketball Tournament. He was a center on the 2015 team who made it to the semifinals, falling 87–76 to Team 23.
