= Alberto Lina =

Filipino businessman and customs official (1948–2025)

Commissioner of the Bureau of Customs
- In office April 23, 2015 – June 30, 2016
- President: Benigno Aquino III
- Preceded by: Sunny Sevilla
- Succeeded by: Nicanor Faeldon
- In office February 4, 2005 – July 8, 2005
- President: Gloria Macapagal Arroyo
- Preceded by: George Jereos
- Succeeded by: Alexander Arevalo

Personal details
- Born: Alberto David Lina; April 23, 1948
- Died: February 25, 2025 (aged 76)
- Party: KAMPI (until 2005)
- Parent(s): Jose S. Lina, Sr. (father); Dionisia David (mother)
- Relatives: Joey Lina (brother)
- Education: De La Salle University
- Occupation: Businessman

Alberto David Lina (April 23, 1948 – February 25, 2025) was a Filipino businessman and government official who served as Commissioner of Bureau of Customs. He first served as commissioner from February 4, to July 8, 2005, and again in April 23, 2015 to June 30, 2016. He was also the founder and owner of Airfreight 2100 (owner of courier service Air21).

== Early life ==
Lina was the second of 12 children to former 2Lt. Jose S. Lina (also a teacher and former World War II veteran), and Dionisia David. Lina's brother is former Senator Joey Lina Jr.

== Business career ==
Lina worked as a professional for many years for a multinational company who has business in freight forwarding. He worked for the company until June 21, 1979, as his contract wasn't renewed by the board of directors.

In effect, I was terminated. At the time, I lived a comfortable life. I was travelling a lot for the company and I had three cars. But I was only an employee. That led me to do things on my own. If I didn’t get fired, I wouldn’t have created my own group of companies. I saw the opportunity in freight and I built my businesses around it. I’ll never forget 21 because that was the day when I opened a new chapter in my life.

After being fired, he established the Airfreight 2100 (Air21), his own freight forwarding company. He later controls over 19 companies by 2012, Airfreight 2100, DOS-1 or 21 (the acronym for Dynamic Outsource Solutions, Inc.), and GO21 (a messenger service using bicycle), U-Freight Inc. and U-Ocean Inc. He is also have ventures including Burger King Philippines (where he is chairman and a partner of PLDT chairman Manny V. Pangilinan and the Jollibee group), Waste and Resource Management (WARM), now defunct Mail and More, Corporate Air and Shopinas.com, an e-commerce or internet trading outfit, also now defunct.

He also received honors and awards such as honors graduate of the Philippine School of Business Administration, a Most Outstanding Manilan awardee and recipient of the Papal Award Pro Ecclesia et Pontifice from the Archdiocese of Manila.

Lina began his basketball investment in 1997 when he owned the Laguna Lakers in the Metropolitan Basketball Association. He also became the manager of the Philippine squad in 1999, that captured the gold medal in basketball at the Southeast Asian Games. In 2002, he started a team in the PBA after acquiring Bong Tan's Tanduay Rhum Masters, the team became FedEx Express (that turned into Air21 Express, and later Barako Bull Energy), and reviving the Tour of Luzon (also called FedEx Express Tour, later Tour Pilipinas, Golden Tour, Padyak Pinoy and now, on its first decade, Le Tour de Filipinas), with a global cast and sanction by the Union Cycliste Internationale. He also acquired the Barako Bull Energy Boosters and revived the name Air21 Express.

== Customs career ==
Lina became Commissioner of Bureau of Customs in February 4, 2005. He faced some controversy while on his first term as commissioner. But he resigned in July 8, 2005, and joined the “Hyatt 10”, a group of cabinet officers following allegations of election cheating incident against then President Gloria Macapagal Arroyo in 2004 elections. In April 23, 2015, he returned to the post, and promised reforms, In August 24, 2015, President Noynoy Aquino orders the Customs to stop the physical inspections of balikbayan boxes unless X-ray and K-9 examinations give rise to suspicions that they contain prohibited items. On the Senate hearing last September 3, Lina apologized for the inconvenience brought about by the alleged opening of balikbayan boxes by Customs personnel.

He served until June 30, 2016, but graft charges were brought against him by the Ombudsman on July 19 in the same year.

== Political career ==
Lina ran for Governor of Laguna in 2001 under KAMPI to succeed his brother Joey, who had been appointed Secretary of Interior and Local Government. Lina lost to Teresita Lazaro, the vice governor who succeeded Joey.

== Death ==
On February 25, 2025, OneLGC announced that Lina had died at the age of 76.

== Electoral performance ==
=== 2001 ===
2001 Laguna gubernatorial election
Party	Candidate	Votes	%
PMP	Teresita Lazaro (Incumbent)	401,424	60.47
KAMPI	Alberto Lina	262,403	39.53
Total votes		663,827	100.00
PMP hold			
