= Barako Bull Energy =

Philippine Basketball Association team

- Founded: 2002
- Dissolved: Sold in 2016
- History: FedEx Express (2002–2005); Air21 Express (2005–2009, 2010–2011); Burger King Titans/Whoppers (2009–2010); Barako Bull Energy Cola (2012–2013); Barako Bull Energy (2011–2012, 2013–2016)
- Team colors: Red, black, yellow, white
- Company: Energy Food and Drinks Inc.
- Head coach: (Philippines) Koy Banal
- Ownership: Alberto D. Lina
- Championships: None; 1 Finals Appearance
Light uniform	Dark uniform

The Barako Bull Energy were a Philippine Basketball Association that began in 2002 as the FedEx Express.

From its first season until 2005, the team was dubbed as the FedEx Express before changing to Air21 Express. From the 2009 PBA Fiesta Conference until the 2009–10 PBA Philippine Cup, it became known as the Burger King Titans. However, when manager Mikee Romero decided to pull out of the team, they were reorganized and renamed the Burger King Whoppers before returning to their original name starting the 2010 PBA Fiesta Conference.

However, Air21 changed its name to Barako Bull Energy after the Lina Group bought the original Barako Bull franchise and 49 percent stake of Energy Food and Drinks Inc., the owner of the Barako Bull franchise and the exclusive distributor of Red Bull Energy Drink products in the Philippines. They added the word 'cola' to their team name in order to promote their new soft-drink product.

Barako Bull is owned by Energy Food and Drinks Inc., a subsidiary of the Linaheim Corporate Services, owners of the defunct Laguna Lakers of the Metropolitan Basketball Association. The franchise bought the former Tanduay team after the 2001 season.

== History ==
=== Tanduay Rhum Masters ===
The Tanduay Rhum Masters made its PBA return in the 1999 season, after a 12-year hiatus. This time, the team had a new ownership in Asia Brewery of Lucio Tan's son, Bong (The Tanduay team in the 1970s and 80s was owned by the Elizalde family). After a runner-up finish in the 1999 All-Filipino Conference, the Rhum Masters failed to advanced in the finals since. To add insult, the deportation of alleged fil-sham Sonny Alvarado and the indefinite suspensions of Eric Menk and Rudy Hatfield (due to lack of documents to prove themselves as a legitimate Fil-American), the management became frustrated.

After the 2001 season, the fire sale began as Tanduay traded Dondon Hontiveros to San Miguel, Jeffrey Cariaso to the new Coca Cola franchise and Menk to Barangay Ginebra. After this, Tanduay sold its franchise of Bert Lina and the local franchisee of FedEx for a reported sum of PHP 60–75 million.

Technically, the old Tanduay franchise and the current Burger King team's lineage were pulled apart as were most of the other PBA teams (Tanduay/Purefoods, Crispa/Shell, et al.).

=== 2002–2005: FedEx Express ===
After the purchase, they named the team as the FedEx Express. The Express moniker was used as a reference to their company's role in fast-paced delivery.

In the 2001 PBA Draft, the Express held the first overall pick in the draft. Initially, the FedEx expressed its desire to draft MBA star Rommel Adducul, but his MBA team the Batangas Blades denied Adducul's request for a release. With this, FedEx nabbed Saint Francis of Assisi College System 6-foot-9 center Yancy de Ocampo as their first-ever pick as a PBA team. Also in the first round, the Express landed De La Salle University star Renren Ritualo with the eight pick. Jerry Codiñera was also added to the team along with a few holdovers from Tanduay.

Many-time amateur and commercial league champion coach Derrick Pumaren was named as the first head coach of the FedEx team. He was the last coach of the Tanduay franchise in the PBA before it was absorbed by FedEx.

Former Tanduay forward Bong Hawkins was among those absorbed by the FedEx franchise in 2002. However, a controversy sparked between Hawkins and the FedEx management. The former Perpetual Help standout wanted to have the same terms of the salary he held with Tanduay while the FedEx management was basing the contract on a written one. In the end, Hawkins was released and eventually joined Coca-Cola in 2003.

FedEx's first-ever match was an opening game against the Coca-Cola Tigers which they lost. At that time, Ritualo was loaned the RP National pool. The Express also added Bong Alvarez in the lineup along with Jermaine Walker as one of their imports. The Express made it to the quarterfinals of the Governor's Cup but was quickly eliminated. In the Commissioner's Cup, Ritualo made his much-awaited debut with FedEx but the Express once again failed to enter past the semis. Alvarez left the team for the Talk 'N Text Phone Pals, but it acquired the services of Vergel Meneses from Ginebra. In the All-Filipino, FedEx again failed to enter the quarterfinals of the tournament.

Ritualo was named as the Rookie of the Year after the season, to spark a promising future for the team.

In 2003, the Express nabbed former MBA MVP John Ferriols in the draft. The Express finished with an impressive second place in the elimination round of the All-Filipino Cup. In the quarterfinals, the Express failed to enter the semis after finishing last place of the single-round robin quarterfinals phase.

Their performance in the All-Filipino earned the team an early entry to the PBA Invitational tournament. The Express placed third in the special tournament, earning the team its first trophy in the league.

In the Reinforced Conference, the Express bannered Terrence Shannon as import. However, in the opening round, they were eliminated by San Miguel. During the said tournament, Pumaren was fired and was replaced by former Lakers coach Bonifacio "Bonnie" Garcia.

During the 2004 Draft, FedEx nabbed three picks in the first round with Marc Pingris, Ranidel de Ocampo, and Wesley Gonzales. In the Fiesta Conference, the Express ended up in ninth place and was eliminated by the Talk 'N Text Phone Pals in the Wild-Card phase. A coaching change also happened when Garcia was replaced by legendary coach Joe Lipa.

Meneses was then shipped to the Red Bull Barako during the off season for Homer Se and a draft pick.

In the 2004–2005 Philippine Cup, the Express once again finished fourth in the classification phase and was eliminated early by the Alaska Aces.

Lipa resigned after the tournament and was replaced by former Filipino mentor of the Indonesian national team Bong Ramos. They also fielded former NBA veteran Oliver "Pig" Miller for the Fiesta Conference.

The Express finished fifth in the classification phase. It was highlighted by Renren Ritualo's eight three-pointers in a quarter during a game. However, in the Wild-Card phase, they were eliminated by Purefoods.

=== 2005–2009: Air21 Express ===
Air21 Express
Uniforms
Light uniform	Dark uniform

During the off season, the Express renamed the team to the Air21 Express after FedEx left the country. Ramos resigned at season's end due to his failure to imply the team's policy. However, many believed that there were other reasons for his resignation.

Former Laguna Lakers head coach Bo Perasol was named as the replacement. In the 2005 PBA Draft, Air21 had three picks in the first round. They nabbed PBL star Anthony Washington as the first pick and De La Salle University star Mark Cardona as the fifth pick overall. But the Express traded Washington and Cardona in separate deals to Talk 'N Text for Yancy de Ocampo and Patrick Fran, respectively, amid criticisms by various people. The other pick was University of the East star Niño Canaleta.

But Air21 made a strong showing in the 2005–2006 Fiesta Conference. With Perasol as coach and bulky import Shawn Daniels at the helm, the Express surprised everyone with several upsets against Talk 'N Text and San Miguel to finish fourth in the classification phase. Air21 eliminated San Miguel in the wildcard phase and upset the Phone Pals in a five-game quarterfinals affair. However, in six games they were eliminated by Purefoods in the semi-finals. At the end of the conference, Air21 defeated the Barangay Ginebra Kings to capture third place in the tournament.

In the Philippine Cup, the Express acquired Mark Telan from the Talk 'N Text Phone Pals for John Ferriols. On May 8, the team traded its franchise player Ritualo to the Talk 'N Text Phone Pals for Leo Avenido and two future first round picks. Many basketball fans saw this trade as another rebuilding mode for the team while others speculate about a potential cost-cutting of the Express for its impending disbandment, although there were no accuracy of the possibility.

However, since the Ritualo trade, the Express went 3–1 the rest of the classification phase to finish with a 7–9 record. The surge saw the improvement of Air21 rookie Canaleta, who had multiple 30-point games during the streak. However, the Express failed to beat the Coca-Cola Tigers in a one-game playoff for the third outright quarterfinals berth. The loss relegated Air21 in a round-robin wildcard phase. In the deciding game, Ginebra beat the Express, 118–114 in overtime, to eliminate them from contention.

==== 2006–07 season ====
In the off season, the Express acquired Aries Dimaunahan and Ervin Sotto from the Ginebra as part of a huge three-team trade along with the Coca-Cola Tigers. In the 2006 PBA Draft, Air21 selected Arwind Santos of the FEU Tamaraws and the PBL's Magnolia Ice Cream with the second overall pick. Stephen Padilla and Bruce Dacia's contract were not renewed by the team.

After a so-so performance at the Philippine Cup, the Express eked out a 7–11 record, good enough for a return trip to the wildcard phase. Needing to sweep all of the games in order to force a playoff for a quarterfinal berth, the Express defeated all wildcard teams. In the elimination game against Sta. Lucia, the Express came up short as they were beaten 121–118 via overtime.

Before the start of the wildcard phase, Air21 sent Yancy de Ocampo and Leo Avenido to Talk 'N Text for rookies Mark Andaya and Abby Santos plus future draft picks.

Air21 also had talks with former Senator and the PBA's Living Legend Robert Jaworski to either accept a capacity within the team or as a head coach before he beg off prior to the start of the Fiesta Conference.

Still, the Express finished with a 10–8 record for fifth place in the standings with Shawn Daniels as import. At one point, Air21 was 7–3 before losing five of their last eight games, before beating San Miguel in a one-game playoff for the third outright quarterfinals berth.

The Talk 'N Text Phone Pals defeated them in the quarters in a full three-game series, despite the Express' Game 1 victory.

==== 2007–08 season ====
The off season saw Air21 selecting Ateneo teammates JC Intal and Doug Kramer in the first round while nabbing Marvin Cruz in the second round of the 2007 PBA Draft.

The buzz about Jaworski coaching the team once again came to light but the 'Living Legend' did not made any decision on it. This kept Perasol as head coach for the 2007–08 season. The Express had a rocky 2007-08 PBA Philippine Cup, finishing the elimination round with a 7–11 record, tied for 8th (they were eventually seeded 8th since they had beaten the team they were tied with, the Coca-Cola Tigers, in the elimination round twice).

In the ensuing wildcard phase, the Express eliminated the defending champions Barangay Ginebra Kings, thanks to Wynne Arboleda's career-high 32 points. However, they were beaten by the Tigers in the last wildcard causing the team to be eliminated.

In the 2008 PBA Fiesta Conference, the team, bannered by 6-ft 9-in hulking import Steve Thomas with Gary David and Arwind Santos, entered the Finals for the first time in franchise history. They then faced the crowd-darlings of Philippine basketball, the Barangay Ginebra Kings. During Game 1, Ginebra took the game via a 105–96 decision. The Express came roaring back in Game 2 by plastering the Kings to a 124–90 rout. Game 3 was also bagged by the Express. However, the Kings managed to tie the series in Game 4 with a 90–77 win. In Game 5, Air21 squeaked past the Kings with a 76–73 dogfight and a 3–2 advantage in the series. Needing only one game to win the series and the very first championship of the team, Air21 was prevented by a depleted lineup of the Kings due to injury, and forced a deciding Game 7 with an 80–75 victory in Game 6. And in Game 7, with all the cards in place, the two teams fought gallantly to the finish, but the more experienced Ginebra showed resiliency and defeated the Express, denying them the title. Even with the shortcoming, it was still the best showing of the team since they entered the league in 2002.

==== 2008–09 season ====
On December 17, 2008, Ranidel de Ocampo was unexpectedly traded from Air21 in exchange for Don Allado, and a first-round pick in 2012. During the Philippine Cup eliminations, they ended up 8–10 and bowed out to the San Miguel Beermen in the wildcard. In the next conference, they changed their name to the Burger King Titans and an all-new coaching staff was formed consisting of Yeng Guiao, Junel Baculi, Roehl Nadurata, and Jorge Gallent.

On January 26, 2009, they traded Don Allado, Niño Canaleta, JC Intal, and Doug Kramer. In return, they gained Beau Belga, Chad Alonzo, and three future picks (Ginebra's first round selections in 2012 and 2013 and another from Purefoods). Allado and Canaleta went to Purefoods while Intal and Doug Kramer moved over to Ginebra. Chico Lanete was also part of the deal, first going to Burger King before ending up with Ginebra.

=== Burger King Titans ===
Burger King Titans
Colors
Uniforms
Light uniform	Dark uniform

A day after the 3-way trade with the Barangay Ginebra Kings and the Purefoods Tender Juicy Giants, the PBA board finally approved the entry of Burger King in the PBA through Air21. During the meeting, team manager of the Express Lito Alvarez presented the documents that proved the 60 percent ownership of Bert Lina of the Burger King franchise. He also showed a letter from the late former commissioner Jun Bernardino that states: "if Mr. Lina owns at least 33.3 percent of any brand name in the PBA, then no franchise/transfer fee will be paid." The board then approved the name change of the franchise.

As part of the competitive change, Philippine Basketball League team Harbour Centre Batang Pier's owner Mikee Romero also joined the Burger King Titans as the alternate Governor and Head of Basketball Operations. Erick Arejola was also appointed as the team Manager. Romero's first move was hiring former Red Bull Barako mentor and current RP head coach Yeng Guiao. Junel Baculi and Jorge Gallent were also added to assist Guiao.

=== Burger King Whoppers (2009–2010) ===
Burger King Whoppers
Colors
Uniforms
Light uniform	Dark uniform

However, barely three months after controlling the franchise, Romero handed back the team to Lina after Harbour failed to close out a deal with the Metro Pacific Company in the selling of its port company to Manuel V. Pangilinan's Group. The amount was reportedly the one to be used in the expansion program of the Burger King fast-food chain, which currently has a total of 63 outlets in the Philippines. This caused changes in the front office staff, with Lito Alvarez assuming the position of team manager. As a result, Gallent went to the Purefoods Tender Juicy Giants; Guiao and Baculi stayed as coaches. The Titans would also change their team nickname anew, using "Burger King Whoppers" as their new team name. Guiao's long time deputy Roehl Nadurata and Johnny Tam were then hired by the team.

==== Baguio, Se, Cruz Traded to SMC Teams ====
Cyrus Baguio, reportedly unhappy in Burger King, was dealt to the Barangay Ginebra Kings along with bruiser Homer Se for future picks while Celino Cruz was shipped to the Purefoods TJ Giants for forward Aaron Aban.

==== Sharma and Alonzo Trade ====
Burger King traded Richard Alonzo to Barako Bull for Carlo Sharma.

==== Arwind Santos to San Miguel Beermen ====
Burger King marquee player Arwind Santos was traded to San Miguel for Marc Pingris and Ken Bono, and San Miguel's 2010 first-round pick. Pingris was also an original member of the team being the third overall pick in the Draft. He played one season for the team before being shipped to Purefoods. He was then traded to San Miguel for Enrico Villanueva. Bono, a one-time UAAP Most Valuable Player, first played for Alaska before he was traded to SMB. During the 2008-2009 PBA Season, Santos played a total of 44 games, averaging 16.18 points (6th overall), 7.75 rebounds (9th), 1.11 blocks (4th) shot 70.8% from the freethrow line and 40.4% from the field in 31.73 minutes (12th) per game.

==== Japeth traded to TNT, then released back to Gilas ====
After playing a single game for the Whoppers, Aguilar was traded from the Burger King Whoppers as he was forwarded to the Talk 'N Text Tropang Texters in exchange for four first round future picks (2010, 2012, 2013, 2014) and undisclosed amount of money. The Tropang Texters in turn released him back to Smart Gilas.

==== Wynne Arboleda incident ====
Another incident, this time involving its team captain and son-in-law of its team owner, put the Whoppers into the sports headlines once more. On October 16, 2009, during their game against Aguilar and Smart Gilas at the Araneta Coliseum, specifically halfway in the second quarter, Wynne Arboleda physically assaulted a paying spectator, Alain Katigbak, after the latter shouted profane words directed at him following his second flagrant foul against Gilas' Mac Baracael. As a result of the second flagrant foul, he was ejected from the court soon after.

Three days later, PBA Commissioner Sonny Barrios suspended him for the rest of the 2009–2010 season without pay effective immediately, on top of any possible court case Katigbak would file against him as a result of the assault. The suspension is said to be the league's heaviest sanction to date. In addition, he was fined PhP20,000 for the two flagrant 1 fouls he committed, and was blacklisted from attending PBA games during the period of his suspension.

=== Air21 Express (2010–2011) ===
After finishing 7th in the Philippine Cup, team owner Lito Alvarez announced that the team will revert to the Air21 Express name. The team then acquired Doug Kramer and Rich Alvarez from the Barangay Ginebra Kings in exchange for Yancy de Ocampo and a future 2nd round draft pick. They also got the service of Mike Cortez from the San Miguel Beermen in exchange for Alex Cabagnot. They then drafted Nonoy Baclao, Rabeh Al-Hussaini, and Rey Guevarra.

=== Blockbuster Trade ===
On March 2, 2011, the San Miguel Beermen has finally closed a deal with the Air 21 Express with the approval of Commissioner Chito Salud. The Beermen shifted Paul Artadi, Danny Seigle, Cebuano Hot Shot Dondon Hontiveros and Dorian Pena to the Express in exchange for three draft rookie draft picks Nonoy Baclao, Rabeh Al-Hussaini and Rey Guevarra. The trade is the revised proposal of the Beermen which initially involved Joseph Yeo, Danny Seigle and Mick Pennisi in exchange for the said top rookie picks. It was not approved by Commissioner Chito Salud until the revised trade came in.

=== Barako Bull era (2011–2016) ===
The logo of Barako Bull Energy Cola

After the sale of the majority share of the Energy Food and Drinks, a subsidiary of Photokina Marketing that exclusively distributed Red Bull Energy Drink to the Philippines to the Lina Group of Companies, the group announced that Air21 will be renamed to Barako Bull, fulfilling one of the provisions of the agreement between the Chua and Lina groups. In order to prevent conflict with the Petron Blaze Boosters, the team opted to drop the "Boosters" from their name and became known as just simply the Energy. The team then hired veteran coach Junel Baculi, who previously coached Barako Bull (now Shopinas.com Clickers) before its dissolution. They then acquired free agent Jondan Salvador, then on the 2011 PBA Draft selected former Gilas reserve Dylan Ababou and PBA D - League MVP Allein Maliksi, who joined the main roster almost immediately. The team also became involved in a three-way trade with sister team Shopinas.com Clickers and B-Meg Llamados where Barako Bull acquired Don Allado and future second round picks from B - Meg, while losing Elmer Espiritu to Shopinas.

On November 16, the Philippine Basketball Association commissioner Chito Salud approved of a trade that sent Allein Maliksi and former Rookie of the Year Rico Maierhofer to Barangay Ginebra Kings, Jimbo Aquino and 2013 1st round pick(GIN) to Barako Bull Energy, and 2002 PBA 1st overall pick Yancy de Ocampo + 2012 2nd round pick(GIN) to San Mig Coffee Mixers.

On September 8, 2012, it was announced that they will play under the moniker Barako Bull Energy Cola.

On April 3, 2013, NBA player DJ Mbenga signed with the Barako Bull Energy.

==== 2013–14 season ====
Before the start of the 39th PBA season, Barako Bull was the subject of all the criticism from league pundits and social media, because of the questionable personnel moves made during the off-season. They terminated Rajko Toroman's contract as its active consultant, and kept Bong Ramos as its coach. They also traded away all their three first round picks for established veterans, which team manager Raffy Casyao considers as team strategy. Casyao explained that they wanted to get quality, tried and tested veteran players that can give them some impact right away, as opposed to rebuilding the team with rookies from the ground up. As a result of these offseason moves, they lost Danny Seigle to free agency, and added loads of veterans Dennis Miranda, Rico Maierhofer, Willy Wilson, Willie Miller, Robert Labagala, and Dorian Peña. They also drafted ex-UST stalwart Jeric Fortuna and Benildean star Carlo Lastimosa.

As a matter of fact, they were projected to finish dead last in the conference, yet they proved their doubters wrong. They finished sixth in the 2013–14 PBA Philippine Cup with 5–9 record, earned a playoff spot and the right to face Petron Blaze Boosters in their best of three quarterfinal series. They were swept by the Boosters.

In the midst of 2013–14 PBA season Siot Tanquingcen took over as the Barako Bulls new head coach replacing Bong Ramos, However, just 2 days before the start of the 2014–15 PBA Philippine Cup The Barako Bulls management decided to part ways with Tanquinsen sighting professional differences, Assistant Coach Koy Banal was named the new head coach. The team also has been involved in a series of trades first sending sophomore Jeric Fortuna to San Miguel Beermen for veteran Paolo Hubalde they also traded veteran big man Mick Pennisi to Purefoods Star Hotshots for Ronnie Matias, Isaac Holstein and two future second round picks.

== Sale of franchise to Phoenix Petroleum ==
In January 2016, Phoenix Petroleum Philippines, Inc. had sealed a deal with Barako Bull for the team's transfer of ownership costing 100 million pesos. The PBA Board of Governors unanimously approve the sale on January 20. In addition, the board also got the green light to Phoenix to play in the 2016 PBA Commissioner's Cup instead of waiting until the 2016-17 PBA season.

== Relationship with San Miguel Corporation (SMC) owned teams ==
Barako Bull has been often criticized for its transactions with San Miguel Corporation-owned franchises (San Miguel Beermen, Barangay Ginebra San Miguel and Star Hotshots). When the franchise was still known as the Air21 Express, they were involved in dubious transactions, often acting as a conduit in trades between the SMC teams, since the league prohibit teams with common ownership (sister teams) in trading players directly. The team also traded future draft picks with SMC teams as Barako Bull always ends up at the bottom of the standings at the conclusion of the season. June Mar Fajardo (San Miguel), Chris Ellis (Barangay Ginebra), Ian Sangalang and Justin Melton (Star) were all acquired by their respective teams from trading future draft picks from Barako Bull.

== Mascot ==
"Captain Bull" was the mascot of the Energy. He was also the mascot of the original Red Bull/Barako Bull franchise since their first season in 2000.

== Final roster ==
Barako Bull Energy roster
Players
Coaches

Pos.	#	POB	Name	Height	Weight	DOB (YYYY–MM–DD)	From
G/F	1	(Canada)	James Forrester	6 ft 6 in (1.98 m)	190 lb (86 kg)	1989–09–03	Arellano
G	2	(United States)	Josh Urbiztondo	6 ft 3 in (1.91 m)	185 lb (84 kg)	1983–02–27	Fresno Pacific
G	6	(Philippines)	Emman Monfort	6 ft 1 in (1.85 m)	132 lb (60 kg)	1989–07–02	Ateneo
F	7	(Philippines)	JC Intal (C)	6 ft 6 in (1.98 m)	185 lb (84 kg)	1983–11–18	Ateneo
G	8	(Philippines)	RR Garcia	6 ft 1 in (1.85 m)	165 lb (75 kg)	1990–01–12	Far Eastern
G	11	(Philippines)	Jeric Fortuna	6 ft 2 in (1.88 m)	170 lb (77 kg)	1991–11–25	UST
F/C	12	(Philippines)	Prince Caperal	6 ft 7 in (2.01 m)	230 lb (104 kg)	1993–06–12	Arellano
G	17	(Germany)	Jens Knuttel (IN)	6 ft 1 in (1.85 m)	169 lb (77 kg)	1989–09–17	Far Eastern
F/C	20	(Philippines)	Yutien Andrada (R)	6 ft 7 in (2.01 m)	203 lb (92 kg)	1990–11–18	De La Salle
G	26	(Philippines)	Chico Lanete	6 ft 1 in (1.85 m)	180 lb (82 kg)	1979–08–01	Lyceum
F	28	(United States)	Willy Wilson	6 ft 5 in (1.96 m)	215 lb (98 kg)	1980–01–30	De La Salle
F/C	34	(Philippines)	Michael Miranda (R)	6 ft 6 in (1.98 m)	210 lb (95 kg)	1990–12–12	San Sebastian
G	42	(Philippines)	Paul Sorongon	6 ft 2 in (1.88 m)	178 lb (81 kg)	1985–12–12	Philippines
F	45	(Philippines)	Mac Baracael	6 ft 6 in (1.98 m)	205 lb (93 kg)	1985–04–14	Far Eastern
C	88	(Australia)	Mick Pennisi	6 ft 11 in (2.11 m)	235 lb (107 kg)	1975–03–13	Eastern Michigan
F	91	(Philippines)	Rodney Brondial	6 ft 6 in (1.98 m)	210 lb (95 kg)	1990–11–20	Adamson

Head coach

- (Philippines) Koy Banal (Mapúa)

Assistant coach(es)

- (Philippines) Arturo Dela Cruz (San Sebastian)
- Jigs Mendoza (Philippines)
- (Philippines) Paolo Rivero (Adamson)

Team manager

- (Philippines) Raymond Rodriguez

Legend

- (C) Team captain
- (CI) Commissioner's Cup Import
- (GI) Governors' Cup Import
- (EI) EASL Import
- (DP) Unsigned draft pick
- (FA) Free agent
- (IN) Inactive
- (S) Suspended
- (R) Rookie
- Injured

Roster

== Season-by-season records ==
Records from the 2015–16 PBA season:

Conf.	Team name	Elimination round				Playoffs	
Conf.	Team name	Finish	W	L	PCT	Stage	Results
PHI	Barako Bull Energy	8th/12	5	6	.455	Quarterfinals: 1st Phase	GlobalPort 94, Barako Bull 85*
Elimination round			5	6	.455	—	0 semifinal appearances
Playoffs			0	1	.000	—	0 Finals appearances
Cumulative records			5	7	.417	—	0 championships
Total franchise			238	327	.421	—	0 championships

*one-game playoffs
**team had the twice-to-beat advantage

== Players of note ==
=== Members of the PBA's 40 greatest players ===
- Jerry Codiñera - played for FedEx from 2002 to 2005.
- Vergel Meneses - played for FedEx from 2002 to 2004.
- Willie Miller - played for Barako Bull from 2011 to 2012 and from 2013 to 2014.
- Marc Pingris - played for FedEx franchise from 2004 to 2005.
- Arwind Santos - played for Air21 Express/Burger King Whoppers from 2006 to 2009

=== Other notable players ===
- Paul Alvarez - played for FedEx in 2002.
- Wynne Arboleda - longest tenured player for the franchise. Played from 2002 to 2012
- Cyrus Baguio - played for Burger King for 2009.
- KG Canaleta - played for Air21 from 2005 to 2009.
- Gary David - played for Air21/Burger King from 2005 to 2009. Air21 Express Franchise' All-Time Leading Scorer.
- Ranidel de Ocampo - played for FedEx/Air21 franchise from 2004 to 2008.
- Yancy de Ocampo - played for FedEx/Air21 franchise from 2002 to 2004, 2005–2006; team's first-ever draft choice and had two stints with the team.
- John Ferriols - played for FedEx franchise from 2004 to 2006.
- JC Intal - played for Air21/Barako Bull from 2007 to 2009 and from 2013 to 2016.
- Mick Pennisi - played for Barako Bull from 2011 to 2016.
- Dindo Pumaren (San Beda) - played his last PBA season with FedEx in 2002.
- Ren-Ren Ritualo (La Salle) - played for FedEx/Air21 franchise from 2002 to 2006.
- Danny Seigle - played for Air21/Barako Bull from 2011 to 2013.
- Ronald Tubid - played for FedEx/Air21 franchise from 2005 to 2006 and for Barako Bull for a part of 2012 to 2013.

=== Imports ===
- Steven Thomas – led Air21 to its first finals appearance in the 2007 – 2008 season.
- Shawn Daniels – led Air21 to a third-place finish in the 2005 – 06 Fiesta Conference. Had multiple stints with the team.
- Alpha Bangura - played for Air21 in the import-laden conferences during the 2010 - 11 season.
- Evan Brock – played in the 2013 Commissioner's Cup.
- Gabe Freeman - former best import who played for Barako Bull during the 2012 Commissioner's Cup.
- Leroy Hickerson - had two stints with the team in 2010 and 2012.
- Alvin Jefferson – known for breaking the Araneta Coliseum backboard in a preseason game but played only two games in the 2004 Fiesta Conference.
- Mike Maddox - played as a replacement in the 2004 Fiesta Conference.
- Liam McMorrow - played for Barako Bull during the 2015 Governors' Cup.
- Anthony Miller – played for FedEx in the 2005 Fiesta Conference.
- Franz Pierre-Louis – played for FedEx in the 2002 Commissioners Cup.
- Roderick Rhodes – one of the first two imports in team history.
- Jeremy Robinson – played as a replacement import for one game.
- Terrence Shannon – played for FedEx in the 2003 Reinforced Conference.
- Jermaine Walker – played for FedEx in the 2002 Governors Cup.

== Coaches ==
- Derrick Pumaren (2002–2003)
- Bonnie Garcia (2003–2004)
- Joe Lipa (2004–2005)
- Bong Ramos (2005, 2011, 2012–2014)
- Bo Perasol (2005–2009)
- Yeng Guiao (2009–2011)
- Junel Baculi (2011–2012)
- Siot Tanquingcen (2014)
- Koy Banal (2014–2016)

== Awards ==
=== Individual awards ===
PBA Rookie of the Year	PBA All-Defensive Team	PBA Mythical First Team
Renren Ritualo (2002)	Wynne Arboleda (2005-06, 2006-07, 2007-08, 2008-09); Gary David (2006-07); Arwind Santos (2006-07, 2007-08, 2008-09); Doug Kramer (2011-12)	Gary David (2006-07); Arwind Santos (2007-08, 2008-09)
PBA Mythical Second Team	PBA Most Improved Player	PBA Sportsmanship Award
Wynne Arboleda (2006-07); Arwind Santos (2006-07)	Gary David (2006-07)	Gary David (2006-07); Willie Miller (2013-14)

=== PBA Press Corps Individual Awards ===
Defensive Player of the Year	Comeback Player of the Year
Wynne Arboleda (2006-07, 2008-09); Arwind Santos (2007-08)	Gary David (2006-07)
Mr. Quality Minutes	All-Rookie Team
Renren Ritualo (2003); Ronald Tubid (2005-06)	Ranidel de Ocampo (2004-05); KG Canaleta (2005-06); Arwind Santos (2006-07); Doug Kramer (2007-08); Jake Pascual (2014-15)

=== All-Star Weekend ===
All-Star MVP	All-Star Selection	Slam Dunk Contest
Vergel Meneses (2003)	2003: Vergel Meneses; 2004: John Ferriols; Vergel Meneses; 2005: John Ferriols; Renren Ritualo; Ronald Tubid; 2006: Renren Ritualo; 2007: Gary David; Ranidel de Ocampo; 2008: Ranidel de Ocampo; Arwind Santos; 2009: J.R. Quiñahan; Arwind Santos; 2011: Dondon Hontiveros; Danny Seigle	KG Canaleta (2005, 2006, 2007)

Preceded by Tanduay Rhum Masters (2nd)	PBA teams genealogies 2002–2016	Succeeded by Phoenix Fuel Masters
