= Meralco Bolts all-time roster =

The following is a list of players, both past and current, who appeared in at least one game for the Meralco Bolts PBA franchise. Statistics are accurate as of the 2024 PBA Philippine Cup.

== Players ==
^	Denotes player who is currently on the Bolts roster								
^{+}	Denotes player who played as an import for the Bolts								
G	Guard	G/F	Guard-forward	F	Forward	F/C	Forward-center	C	Center

Player	Place of birth	Pos.	From	Yrs.	Seasons	Statistics					Ref.
Player	Place of birth	Pos.	From	Yrs.	Seasons	GP	MP	PTS	REB	AST	Ref.
Rabeh Al-Hussaini	Philippines	C	Ateneo	3	2013–2014; 2015–2017	54	779	291	182	29	
Jimmy Alapag	United States	G	Cal State San Bernardino	1	2015–2016	47	1,058	353	77	188	
Yousif Aljamal	Philippines	F	San Beda	2	2010–2012	23	211	57	38	9	
Don Allado	Philippines	F/C	De La Salle	1	2013–2014	9	81	23	24	2	
Raymond Almazan^	Philippines	C	Letran	5	2019–present	167	3,596	1,364	1,115	130	
Baser Amer	Philippines	G	San Beda	5	2015–2020	195	5,075	2,018	598	554	
Seiya Ando^{+}	Japan	G	Japan	1	2015	11	307	88	30	21	
Sean Anthony	Canada	F	McGill	1	2013–2014	40	849	287	211	76	
Marlou Aquino	Philippines	C	Adamson	1	2010–2011	17	205	58	37	10	
Ford Arao	Philippines	F/C	Ateneo	1	2010	1	3	0	0	0	
Paul Artadi	Philippines	G	UE	3	2012–2014	43	423	93	57	64	
Simon Atkins	Philippines	G	De La Salle	4	2014–2018	35	375	55	29	47	
Nonoy Baclao	Philippines	F/C	Ateneo	3	2013; 2021–2023	31	305	59	26	9	
Jason Ballesteros	Philippines	F/C	San Sebastian	3	2011–2012; 2014; 2017–2018	26	299	51	96	8	
Chris Banchero^	United States	G	Seattle Pacific	3	2021–present	100	2,542	936	298	324	
Mac Baracael	Philippines	F	Far Eastern	1	2017–2018	16	148	50	23	10	
Earl Barron^{+}	United States	F/C	Memphis	1	2012	10	420	295	156	21	
Brandon Bates^	Australia	C	De La Salle	1	2023–present	30	505	104	154	12	
Jaypee Belencion	Philippines	G/F	Letran	1	2012–2013	6	23	6	2	1	
Beau Belga	Philippines	F/C	Philippine Christian	1	2010–2011	41	824	276	208	55	
Mac Belo	Philippines	F	Far Eastern	2	2021–2023	42	530	221	124	26	
Tony Bishop^{+}	United States	F	Texas State	1	2021	23	980	591	307	75	
Aaron Black^	Philippines	G	Ateneo	4	2020–present	115	3,121	1,248	546	363	
Ken Bono	Philippines	F/C	Adamson	2	2015–2018	37	260	88	48	14	
Mark Borboran	Philippines	F	UE	2	2011–2013	18	255	77	55	7	
Suleiman Braimoh^{+}	Nigeria	F/C	Rice	1	2023	5	214	164	60	14	
Anthony Bringas	Philippines	F/C	Far Eastern	1	2013–2014	7	39	8	15	3	
Ronjay Buenafe	Philippines	G	Emilio Aguinaldo	1	2012–2013; 2015–2016	44	814	321	79	38	
Ryan Buenafe	Philippines	G/F	Ateneo	3	2014–2017	42	355	99	67	26	
Gilbert Bulawan	Philippines	F	San Sebastian	2	2011–2013	19	182	50	38	2	
Brian Butch^{+}	United States	F/C	Wisconsin	1	2013	6	247	165	126	12	
KG Canaleta	Philippines	F	UE	2	2019–2019	58	935	437	171	48	
Michael Cañete	Philippines	F	Arellano	1	2021	9	13	2	2	0	
Anjo Caram^	Philippines	G	San Beda	10	2013–present	319	4,222	1,222	295	378	
Mark Cardona	Philippines	G	De La Salle	3	2010–2013	107	3,363	824	464	259	
Justin Chua	Philippines	F/C	Ateneo	2	2015–2017	26	289	91	47	7	
Mike Cortez	United States	G	De La Salle	3	2013–2015	64	1,763	501	201	220	
Dennis Daa	Philippines	F	Centro Escolar Las Piñas	1	2012	6	46	18	14	2	
Anthony Dandridge^{+}	United States	G	New Mexico	1	2011	6	247	165	126	12	
Ed Daquioag	Philippines	G	UST	1	2016–2017	25	314	128	46	29	
Diego Dario	Philippines	G	Philippines	2	2023–present	17	156	42	10	19	
Gary David	Philippines	G	Lyceum	3	2013–2016	96	2,820	1,370	326	154	
Josh Davis^{+}	United States	F/C	San Diego State	1	2015	15	608	324	258	32	
Eric Dawson^{+}	United States	F/C	Midwestern State	1	2013	17	698	503	272	48	
Ranidel de Ocampo	Philippines	F	Saint Francis of Assisi	3	2017–2019	41	826	297	177	69	
Jared Dillinger	United States	G/F	Hawaiʻi	7	2013–2019	184	3,878	1,782	660	321	
Allen Durham^{+}	United States	F/C	Grace Christian	4	2016–2019	85	3,559	2,410	1,456	534	
Andre Emmett^{+}	United States	F	Texas Tech	1	2015	13	548	424	139	51	
Pong Escobal	Philippines	G	San Beda	1	2010–2011	21	295	68	36	24	
Gabby Espinas	Philippines	F	Philippine Christian	3	2010–2012; 2019	68	1,956	773	507	71	
Jarrid Famous^{+}	United States	C	South Florida	1	2012	3	131	78	45	6	
Bryan Faundo	Philippines	F/C	Letran	6	2011–2012; 2015–2020	157	1,588	493	289	59	
John Ferriols	Philippines	F/C	USJ–R	2	2012–2014	45	386	111	75	18	
Riego Gamalinda	Philippines	F	San Beda	1	2010–2011	17	170	42	26	11	
Jonathan Grey	Philippines	G/F	St. Benilde	1	2016–2017	13	190	86	36	16	
Rey Guevarra	Philippines	G/F	Letran	4	2013–2016	71	920	171	69	20	
Cliff Hodge^	United States	F	Hawaii Pacific	11	2012–present	425	12,934	3,725	2,902	781	
Reynel Hugnatan	Philippines	F/C	Manila	11	2011–2023	370	7,974	2,848	1,577	419	
Danny Ildefonso	Philippines	F/C	National-U	2	2013–2015	55	582	142	93	41	
Mark Isip	Philippines	F	Far Eastern	2	2010–2012	66	1,488	616	322	38	
Darnell Jackson^{+}	United States	F	Kansas	1	2014	6	259	168	91	21	
Shean Jackson	United States	G	Cheyenne HS (NV)	1	2023	2	15	4	1	0	
Trevis Jackson	United States	G	Sacramento State	3	2019–2021	61	608	194	70	57	
Delroy James^{+}	Guyana	F	Rhode Island	1	2019	6	259	168	91	21	
Jammer Jamito	Philippines	F/C	St. Clare	4	2018–2021	43	296	112	95	5	
Mohammad Jamshidi^{+}	Iran	G/F	IAU	1	2016	5	81	26	13	13	
Franky Johnson	United States	G	Warner Pacific	2	2021–2023	14	57	18	3	2	
Raymar Jose^	Philippines	F	Far Eastern	5	2019–present	77	597	183	188	14	
Chico Lanete	Philippines	G	Lyceum	1	2011–2012	32	544	166	73	90	
Garvo Lanete	Philippines	G	San Beda	2	2017–2018	54	849	304	78	15	
Gani Lawal^{+}	United States	F/C	Georgia Tech	1	2019	7	272	186	146	8	
Zach Lofton^{+}	United States	G	New Mexico State	1	2023	3	121	107	22	13	
Mark Macapagal	Philippines	G/F	San Sebastian	2	2011–2012; 2014–2015	37	372	162	36	18	
Allein Maliksi^	Philippines	G/F	UST	5	2019–present	158	3,652	1,904	520	191	
A. J. Mandani	Canada	G	Missouri S&T	1	2013–2014	7	76	22	11	4	
Allan Mangahas	Philippines	G	Mapúa	1	2012–2013	3	19	4	0	3	
Vic Manuel	Philippines	F	PSBA	1	2013	13	159	72	33	3	
K. J. McDaniels^{+}	United States	F	Clemson	1	2022–2023	22	947	595	313	66	
Jolo Mendoza	Philippines	G	Ateneo	1	2024–present	12	111	48	6	10	
Ogie Menor	Philippines	G/F	San Beda	1	2010–2011	15	176	38	17	3	
Sol Mercado	United States	G	Biola	3	2010–2013	103	3,555	1,644	410	534	
Shonn Miller^{+}	United States	F	Connecticut	1	2024	5	176	111	84	11	
Khasim Mirza	Philippines	F/C	UST	1	2010–2011	1	4	0	0	0	
Phillip Morrison	United States	G	Asbury	1	2014–2015	4	36	9	4	2	
Kelly Nabong	United States	F/C	SRJC	4	2012–2013; 2015–2017	96	1,403	460	393	56	
Chris Newsome^	United States	G/F	Ateneo	8	2015–present	319	11,016	4,449	1,704	1,448	
Johnny O'Bryant III^{+}	United States	F/C	LSU	1	2022	6	259	156	87	30	
Chamberlain Oguchi^{+}	United States	G/F	Illinois State	2	2011; 2012	15	637	392	140	32	
Nelbert Omolon	Philippines	F	Philippine Christian	3	2010–2012; 2013–2014	60	1,308	412	263	40	
Arinze Onuaku^{+}	United States	C	Syracuse	2	2016; 2018	29	1,197	536	490	106	
Chris Pacana	Philippines	G	Saint Francis of Assisi	1	2010–2011	8	106	17	19	10	
Alvin Pasaol^	Philippines	F	UE	3	2021–present	81	641	208	124	30	
Kyle Pascual^	Philippines	F/C	San Beda	2	2022–present	66	610	103	106	19	
Tim Pickett^{+}	United States	F	Florida State	1	2011	3	105	71	33	19	
John Pinto	Philippines	G	Arellano	3	2019–2021	77	1,180	351	120	118	
Bong Quinto^	Philippines	G/F	Letran	5	2019–present	191	4,552	1,517	636	454	
Jai Reyes	Philippines	G	Ateneo	1	2015	11	119	30	7	10	
Jay-R Reyes	Philippines	F/C	Philippines	2	2012–2013	61	996	244	310	19	
Jansen Rios^	Philippines	G/F	Adamson	2	2023–present	32	228	45	37	11	
Renren Ritualo	Philippines	G	De La Salle	1	2011	29	377	134	32	27	
Eric Rodriguez	Philippines	F	Letran	1	2011	16	124	36	18	3	
Chris Ross	United States	G	Marshall	3	2010–2013	96	2,865	607	431	606	
Nico Salva	Philippines	F	Ateneo	3	2017–2020	80	1,067	400	179	49	
Sunday Salvacion	Philippines	G/F	St. Benilde	2	2012–2014	67	1,225	408	156	25	
Joseph Sedurifa	Philippines	G/F	Centro Escolar	3	2015–2018	24	122	41	30	7	
James Sena	Philippines	F/C	José Rizal	3	2013–2015	47	410	92	77	19	
Carlo Sharma	Philippines	F/C	De La Salle	1	2012–2013	11	98	21	24	2	
Alex Stepheson^{+}	United States	F/C	North Carolina	1	2017	14	522	218	271	21	
Asi Taulava	Tonga	C	BYU–Hawaii	2	2010–2012	75	1,187	593	628	48	
Jimmie Taylor^{+}	United States	C	Alabama	1	2019	1	39	13	18	2	
Hans Thiele	Philippines	F/C	UE	1	2010–2011	21	403	120	110	14	
Chris Timberlake	United States	G	North Florida	3	2011–2014	34	495	62	43	44	
Mike Tolomia	Philippines	G	Far Eastern	3	2017–2019	73	867	327	103	85	
Norbert Torres^	Canada	F/C	De La Salle	1	2023–present	28	281	81	50	9	
Jonathan Uyloan	United States	G	Golden West	2	2016–2017	41	477	121	66	45	
Josh Vanlandingham	United States	G/F	Pacific Lutheran	1	2013–2014	8	83	14	8	3	
Shawn Weinstein	United States	G	St. Edward's	1	2010–2011	20	214	46	31	28	
Mario West^{+}	United States	G	Georgia Tech	3	2012–2014	31	1,317	839	280	99	
Terrence Williams^{+}	United States	F	Louisville	1	2014	3	125	65	35	18	
John Wilson	Philippines	G/F	José Rizal	3	2013–2015	75	1,548	592	280	95	
Mark Yee	Philippines	F	San Sebastian (Cavite)	1	2011–2012	18	206	60	10	12	
Joseph Yeo	Philippines	G	De La Salle	1	2016–2017	17	154	69	11	16	
