= Air21 Express all-time roster =

The following is a list of players who have appeared at least in one game for the Air21 Express PBA franchise.

== Players ==
^{+}	Denotes player who played as an import for the Road Warriors								
G	Guard	G/F	Guard-forward	F	Forward	F/C	Forward-center	C	Center

Player	Place of birth	Pos.	From	Yrs.	Seasons	Statistics					Ref.
Player	Place of birth	Pos.	From	Yrs.	Seasons	GP	MP	PTS	REB	AST	Ref.
Mark Andaya	Canada	C	Letran	1	2012	2	8	4	1	0	
Sean Anthony	Canada	F	McGill	1	2014	9	231	127	56	7	
J.R. Aquino	Philippines	F	De La Salle	1	2012	16	118	26	28	6	
Wynne Arboleda	Philippines	G	MLQU	3	2012–2014	54	1,153	247	152	113	
Simon Atkins	Philippines	G	De La Salle	2	2012–2014	45	620	110	60	71	
Nonoy Baclao	Philippines	C	Ateneo	1	2012–13	30	493	115	98	26	
Hyram Bagatsing	Philippines	G	De La Salle	1	2011–2012	6	51	7	3	6	
Mark Borboran	Philippines	F	UE	1	2013–14	27	485	115	90	11	
Mike Burtscher	Switzerland	F/C	Clearwater Christian	1	2013–2014	33	244	36	44	7	
Eric Camson	Philippines	F	Adamson	1	2013–2014	35	382	124	121	7	
Mark Canlas	Philippines	F	UST	1	2011–2012	10	128	26	15	5	
KG Canaleta	Philippines	F	UE	2	2012–2014	71	1,675	866	289	67	
Mark Cardona	Philippines	G	De La Salle	1	2013–2014	37	865	365	112	40	
Mike Cortez	Philippines	G	De La Salle	1	2012–13	27	851	307	129	142	
Bonbon Custodio	Philippines	G	UE	2	2012–2014	35	733	220	106	78	
Dennis Daa	Philippines	F	Centro Escolar Las Piñas	1	2011–2012	15	112	45	29	3	
Marcus Douthit^{+}	Philippines	C	Providence	1	2012	9	378	183	183	34	
Jojo Duncil	Philippines	G	UST	1	2011–2012	23	521	208	81	42	
Mike Dunigan^{+}	USA	C	Oregon	1	2013	15	636	358	231	49	
Pong Escobal	Philippines	G	San Beda	1	2011–2012	10	74	22	7	3	
Elmer Espiritu	Philippines	F	UE	2	2011; 2013–2014	20	281	76	50	19	
Bryan Faundo	Philippines	F/C	Letran	1	2011	8	100	22	17	2	
Zach Graham^{+}	United States	SG/SF	Mississippi	2	2012; 2013	17	755	544	191	55	
Paolo Hubalde	Philippines	G	Mapúa	1	2011–2012	9	219	30	30	28	
Brian Ilad	Philippines	F/C	De La Salle	1	2011–12	2	11	0	6	0	
Mark Isip	Philippines	F	Far Eastern	2	2011–2012	44	1,050	375	214	41	
Chito Jaime	Philippines	F	AMA	1	2013–14	18	127	37	28	3	
Hervé Lamizana^{+}	Côte d'Ivoire	F/C	Rutgers	1	2014	4	167	80	48	12	
Vic Manuel	Philippines	F	PSBA	2	2013–2014	23	487	194	121	16	
Ronnie Matias	Philippines	F	Manila	1	2013–14	11	86	25	15	2	
Ogie Menor	Philippines	SG	San Beda	3	2011–2014	40	415	95	40	16	
Khasim Mirza	Philippines	F	UST	1	2011–2012	15	188	65	36	9	
Nelbert Omolon	Philippines	F	Philippine Christian	2	2011–2013	43	784	236	143	28	
Eliud Poligrates	Philippines	G	Southwestern-U	1	2013–14	22	300	100	33	17	
Aldrech Ramos	Philippines	F	Far Eastern	1	2014	24	559	168	92	9	
Renren Ritualo	Philippines	G	De La Salle	3	2011–2014	49	622	200	48	37	
Rob Reyes	United States	F/C	Flagler	1	2012–2013	15	235	69	66	12	
Eric Salamat	Philippines	G	Ateneo	2	2012–2014	6	53	9	4	1	
Carlo Sharma	Philippines	F/C	De La Salle	2	2013–2014	25	252	88	63	3	
Magi Sison	Philippines	C	Philippines	1	2011–12	9	102	18	32	0	
Dominique Sutton^{+}	United States	F	North Carolina Central	2	2014	10	423	260	154	34	
Yousef Taha	Philippines	C	Mapúa	1	2012	7	137	29	47	9	
Asi Taulava	Tonga	C	BYU–Hawaii	2	2013–2014	43	1,617	618	533	92	
Enrico Villanueva	Philippines	F/C	Ateneo	1	2014	6	26	2	1	1	
Jonas Villanueva	Philippines	G	Far Eastern	1	2014	26	511	115	53	63	
Wesley Witherspoon^{+}	United States	G/F	Memphis	1	2014	12	522	295	105	34	
John Wilson	Philippines	G	José Rizal	1	2012–13	29	510	216	93	35	
Joseph Yeo	Philippines	G	De La Salle	2	2012–2014	43	1,302	529	189	82	
