= 2011–12 Meralco Bolts season =

- Head coach: Ryan Gregorio
- General manager: Virgil Villavicencio
- Owners: Manila Electric Company (an MVP Group subsidiary)

Philippine Cup results
- Record: 8–6 (57.1%)
- Place: 6th
- Playoff finish: Quarterfinalist (eliminated by Petron Blaze, 0–2)

Commissioner's Cup results
- Record: 4–5 (44.4%)
- Place: 6th
- Playoff finish: Quarterfinalist (eliminated by B-Meg, 1–2)

Governors Cup results
- Record: 6–8 (42.9%)
- Place: 6th
- Playoff finish: Semifinalist

Meralco Bolts seasons

The 2011–12 Meralco Bolts season was the 2nd season of the franchise in the Philippine Basketball Association (PBA).

== Key dates ==
- August 28: The 2011 PBA Draft took place in Robinson's Place Ermita, Manila.

== Draft picks ==
Round	Pick	Player	Height	Position	Nationality	College
1	7	Jason Ballesteros	6'6	C	Philippines	San Sebastian
2	17	Gilbert Bulawan	6'5	F	Philippines	San Sebastian

== Roster ==
2011–12 Meralco Bolts roster
Players
Coaches

Pos.	#	POB	Name	Height	Weight	DOB (YYYY–MM–DD)	From
PG	2	(United States)	Chris Timberlake	5 ft 10 in (1.78 m)	184 lb (83 kg)		North Florida
PG	3	(United States)	Solomon Mercado	6 ft 1 in (1.85 m)	185 lb (84 kg)		Biola
F/C	4	(Philippines)	Jay-R Reyes	6 ft 7 in (2.01 m)	215 lb (98 kg)		UP Diliman
C	5	(Tonga)	Asi Taulava (C)	6 ft 9 in (2.06 m)	245 lb (111 kg)		BYU–Hawaii
PG	6	(United States)	Chris Ross	6 ft 1 in (1.85 m)	180 lb (82 kg)		Marshall
F	7	(Philippines)	Mark Canlas (IN)	6 ft 5 in (1.96 m)	200 lb (91 kg)		UST
G/F	8	(Philippines)	Mark Yee	6 ft 3 in (1.91 m)	170 lb (77 kg)		San Sebastian (Cavite)
PG	11	(Philippines)	Paul Artadi	5 ft 9 in (1.75 m)	155 lb (70 kg)		UE
SG	14	(Philippines)	Mark Cardona	6 ft 1 in (1.85 m)	180 lb (82 kg)		De La Salle
F/C	15	(Philippines)	Gilbert Bulawan (R)	6 ft 4 in (1.93 m)	195 lb (88 kg)		San Sebastian
F	16	(Philippines)	Mark Borboran	6 ft 4 in (1.93 m)	185 lb (84 kg)		UE
F/C	18	(Philippines)	Jason Ballesteros (R)	6 ft 7 in (2.01 m)	200 lb (91 kg)		San Sebastian
F	21	(Philippines)	Reynel Hugnatan	6 ft 4 in (1.93 m)	210 lb (95 kg)		Manila
F/C	22	(Philippines)	Dennis Daa	6 ft 5 in (1.96 m)	200 lb (91 kg)		Centro Escolar Las Piñas
G/F	80	(Philippines)	Mark Macapagal	6 ft 3 in (1.91 m)	180 lb (82 kg)		San Sebastian

Head coach

- (Philippines) Ryan Gregorio (UP Diliman)

Assistant coach(es)

- (Philippines) Boyet Fernandez (CSA–Bacolod)
- (Philippines) Ronnie Magsanoc (UP Diliman)
- (Philippines) Patrick Fran (UST)
- (Philippines) Xavier Nunag (UP Diliman)

Legend

- (C) Team captain
- (CI) Commissioner's Cup Import
- (GI) Governors' Cup Import
- (EI) EASL Import
- (DP) Unsigned draft pick
- (FA) Free agent
- (IN) Inactive
- (S) Suspended
- (R) Rookie
- Injured

== Philippine Cup ==
=== Eliminations ===
==== Standings ====
Pos	Team	W	L	PCT	GB	Qualification
1	B-Meg Llamados	10	4	.714 (Note: Head-to-head record: B-Meg 1–1 Talk 'N Text (B-Meg +8))	—	Twice-to-beat in the quarterfinals
2	Talk 'N Text Tropang Texters	10	4	.714	—	Twice-to-beat in the quarterfinals
3	Petron Blaze Boosters	9	5	.643 (Note: Head-to-head differential: Petron +8, Barangay Ginebra +1, Rain or Shine −9)	1	Best-of-three quarterfinals
4	Barangay Ginebra San Miguel	9	5	.643	1	Best-of-three quarterfinals
5	Rain or Shine Elasto Painters	9	5	.643	1	Best-of-three quarterfinals
6	Meralco Bolts	8	6	.571	2	Best-of-three quarterfinals
7	Barako Bull Energy Cola	6	8	.429 (Note: Head-to-head record: Barako Bull 1–1 Powerade (Barako Bull +35))	4	Twice-to-win in the quarterfinals
8	Powerade Tigers	6	8	.429	4	Twice-to-win in the quarterfinals
9	Alaska Aces	3	11	.214	7	
10	Shopinas.com Clickers	0	14	.000	10	

Source: PBA.ph

=== Bracket ===
Quarterfinals
(#1 twice-to-beat)
1	B-Meg	88	123
8	Powerade	97	131*
(Best-of-3)
4	Barangay Ginebra	0
5	Rain or Shine	2
(#2 twice-to-beat)
2	Talk 'N Text	81
7	Barako Bull	79
(Best-of-3)
3	Petron Blaze	2
6	Meralco	0

Semifinals (Best-of-7)
8	Powerade	4
5	Rain or Shine	3
2	Talk 'N Text	4
3	Petron Blaze	3

Finals (Best-of-7)
8	Powerade	1
2	Talk 'N Text	4

*Game went into overtime

=== Quarterfinals ===
==== Petron Blaze-Meralco series ====
December 16

Petron Blaze Boosters 91, Meralco Bolts 84

Smart Araneta Coliseum, Quezon City

December 21

Petron Blaze Boosters 80, Meralco Bolts 64
Petron wins series 2–0

Ynares Center, Antipolo

== Commissioner's Cup ==
=== Eliminations ===
==== Standings ====
Pos	Team	W	L	PCT	GB	Qualification
1	Talk 'N Text Tropang Texters	7	2	.778	—	Advance to semifinals
2	Barangay Ginebra Kings	6	3	.667 (Note: Second seed playoff: Barangay Ginebra 93–84 B-Meg)	1	Advance to semifinals
3	B-Meg Llamados	6	3	.667	1	Advance to quarterfinals
4	Alaska Aces	5	4	.556	2	Advance to quarterfinals
5	Barako Bull Energy Cola	4	5	.444 (Note: Head-to-head quotient: Barako Bull 1.04, Meralco 1.01, Powerade 0.95; sixth seed playoff: Meralco 102–98 Powerade)	3	Advance to quarterfinals
6	Meralco Bolts	4	5	.444	3	Advance to quarterfinals
7	Powerade Tigers	4	5	.444	3	
8	Rain or Shine Elasto Painters	3	6	.333 (Note: Head-to-head quotient: Rain or Shine 1.12, Petron 1.11, Air21 0.80)	4	
9	Petron Blaze Boosters	3	6	.333	4	
10	Air21 Express	3	6	.333	4	

Source: PBA.ph

==== Seeding playoffs ====
March 30

6th seed

Meralco Bolts 102, Powerade Tigers 98

Cuneta Astrodome, Pasay

=== Bracket ===
Quarterfinals (Best-of-3)
4	Alaska	1
5	Barako Bull	2
3	B-Meg	2
6	Meralco	1

Semifinals (Best-of-5)
1	Talk 'N Text	3
5	Barako Bull	2
2	Barangay Ginebra	1
3	B-Meg	3

Finals (Best-of-7)
1	Talk 'N Text	3
3	B-Meg	4

=== Quarterfinals ===
==== B-Meg–Meralco series ====
April 1

B-Meg Llamados 81, Meralco Bolts 103

Smart Araneta Coliseum, Quezon City

April 4

B-Meg Llamados 95, Meralco Bolts 85

Smart Araneta Coliseum, Quezon City

April 8

B-Meg Llamados 86, Meralco Bolts 76
B-Meg wins series, 2–1

Smart Araneta Coliseum, Quezon City

== Governors Cup ==
=== Eliminations ===
==== Standings ====
Pos	Team	W	L	PCT	GB	Qualification
1	Rain or Shine Elasto Painters	8	1	.889	—	Semifinal round
2	B-Meg Llamados	6	3	.667	2	Semifinal round
3	Talk 'N Text Tropang Texters	5	4	.556 (Note: Head-to-head differential: Talk 'N Text +18, Barangay Ginebra 0, Petron −18)	3	Semifinal round
4	Barangay Ginebra Kings	5	4	.556	3	Semifinal round
5	Petron Blaze Boosters	5	4	.556	3	Semifinal round
6	Meralco Bolts	4	5	.444 (Note: Head-to-head differential: Meralco +11, Barako Bull +8, Powerade −18; sixth seed playoffs: Powerade 99–95 Barako Bull, Meralco 94–86 Powerade)	4	Semifinal round
7	Powerade Tigers	4	5	.444	4	
8	Barako Bull Energy Cola	4	5	.444	4	
9	Alaska Aces	2	7	.222 (Note: Head-to-head record: Alaska 1–0 Air21)	6	
10	Air21 Express	2	7	.222	6	

Source: PBA.ph

==== 6th-seed playoffs ====
July 3

KO game

Barako Bull Energy 95, Powerade Tigers 99

Smart Araneta Coliseum, Quezon City

July 4

6th seed

Meralco Bolts 94, Powerade Tigers 86

Smart Araneta Coliseum, Quezon City

=== Semifinals ===
==== Standings ====
Overall standings
Pos	Team	W	L	PCT	GB	Qualification
1	Rain or Shine Elasto Painters	10	4	.714	—	Advance to finals (Note: If a team outside the top two teams wins four semifinal round games, then it and the second-placed team will playoff for the last finals berth; otherwise, the top 2 teams qualify outright.)
2	B-Meg Llamados	9	5	.643 (Note: Head-to-head record: B-Meg 2–0 Barangay Ginebra)	1	Guaranteed finals berth playoff
3	Barangay Ginebra Kings	9	5	.643	1	Qualify to finals berth playoff
4	Talk 'N Text Tropang Texters	8	6	.571	2	
5	Petron Blaze Boosters	6	8	.429 (Note: Head-to-head record: Meralco 1–1, Petron; Petron +12, Meralco −12)	4	
6	Meralco Bolts	6	8	.429	4	

Source: PBA.ph
Notes:

Semifinal round standings
Pos	Team	W	L	Qualification
1	Barangay Ginebra Kings	4	1	Qualify to finals berth playoff (Note: Finals berth playoff: B-Meg 74–72 Barangay Ginebra)
2	B-Meg Llamados	3	2	
3	Talk 'N Text Tropang Texters	3	2	
4	Rain or Shine Elasto Painters	2	3	
5	Meralco Bolts	2	3	
6	Petron Blaze Boosters	1	4	

Source: PBA.ph

== Transactions ==
=== Trades ===
==== Pre-season ====
August 28, 2011	To Meralco Mark Yee (from Talk 'N Text); 2011 1st round pick (Jason Ballesteros) (from Talk 'N Text); Mark Macapagal (from Powerade)	To Talk 'N Text Bam Gamalinda (from Meralco); Shawn Weinstein (from Meralco)	To Powerade Chris Timberlake (from Meralco); Rogemar Menor (from Meralco); 2011 2nd round pick (John Marc Agustin) (from Talk 'N Text)

August 28, 2011	To Meralco 2011 2nd round pick (Gilbert Bulawan)	To Alaska 2014 2nd round pick

==== Commissioner's Cup ====
January 27, 2012	To Meralco Mark Canlas; Dennis Daa	To Air21 Nelbert Omolon; Mark Isip

==== Governors Cup ====
May 11, 2012	To Meralco Jay-R Reyes	To Alaska Gabby Espinas

=== Additions ===
Player	Signed	Former team
Paul Artadi	February 1, 2012	Barako Bull Energy
Mark Canlas	January 27, 2012(via trade)	Air21 Express
Dennis Daa	January 27, 2012(via trade)	Air21 Express
Jay-R Reyes	May 11, 2012(via trade)	Alaska Aces

=== Subtractions ===
Player	Signed	Former team
Nelbert Omolon	January 27, 2012(via trade)	traded to Air21 Express
Mark Isip	January 27, 2012(via trade)	traded to Air21 Express
Gabby Espinas	May 11, 2012(via trade)	traded to Alaska Aces

=== Recruited imports ===
Tournament	Name	Debuted	Last game	Record
Commissioner's Cup	Jarrid Famous	February 10 (vs. B-Meg)	February 17 (vs. Talk 'N Text)	1–2
Commissioner's Cup	Earl Barron	February 26 (vs. Powerade)	April 8 (vs. B-Meg)	5–5
Governors Cup	Chamberlain Oguchi	May 23 (vs. Talk 'N Text)	June 6 (vs. B-Meg)	1–3
Governors Cup	Mario West	June 10 (vs. Alaska)	July 15 (vs. Petron Blaze)	5-5
