= 2011–12 Air21 Express season =

- Head coach: Franz Pumaren
- Owner(s): Airfrieght 2100, Inc. (a Lina Group of Companies subsidiary)

Philippine Cup results
- Record: 0–14 (0%)
- Place: 10th
- Playoff finish: Did not qualify

Commissioner's Cup results
- Record: 3–6 (33.3%)
- Place: 10th
- Playoff finish: Did not qualify

Governors Cup results
- Record: 2–7 (22.2%)
- Place: 10th
- Playoff finish: Did not qualify

Air21 Express seasons

The 2011–12 Air21 Express season was the 1st season of the franchise in the Philippine Basketball Association (PBA). The team, originally known as the Shopinas.com Clickers took over the original Barako Bull Energy Boosters franchise after it was sold to the Lina Group of Companies (which also owns the Air21 Express, renamed as Barako Bull starting this season) in July 2011. The team was renamed as Air21 Express before the start of the Commissioner's Cup.

== Key dates ==
- August 28: The 2011 PBA Draft took place in Robinson's Place Ermita, Manila.

== Draft picks ==
Round	Pick	Player	Position	Nationality	College
1	5	Mark Barroca	PG	Philippines	Far Eastern University
2	11	Magi Sison	C	Philippines	UP Diliman
3	1	Mark Cagoco	PG/SG	Philippines	Jose Rizal University

== Roster ==
2011–12 Air21 Express roster
Players
Coaches

Pos.	#	POB	Name	Height	Weight	DOB (YYYY–MM–DD)	From
PF	0	(Philippines)	Bryan Faundo	6 ft 4 in (1.93 m)	220 lb (100 kg)		Letran
G	1	(Philippines)	Hyram Bagatsing (R)	6 ft 1 in (1.85 m)	190 lb (86 kg)		De La Salle
SF	3	(Philippines)	Nelbert Omolon	6 ft 4 in (1.93 m)	185 lb (84 kg)		Philippine Christian
G/F	8	(Philippines)	J.R. Aquino	6 ft 2 in (1.88 m)	180 lb (82 kg)		De La Salle
F	9	(Philippines)	Elmer Espiritu	6 ft 4 in (1.93 m)	185 lb (84 kg)		UE
G/F	11	(Philippines)	Menor, Ogie	6 ft 2 in (1.88 m)	185 lb (84 kg)		San Beda
G	12	(Philippines)	Paolo Hubalde	5 ft 10 in (1.78 m)	185 lb (84 kg)		UE
SG	14	(Philippines)	Ren-Ren Ritualo (C)	6 ft 2 in (1.88 m)	178 lb (81 kg)		De La Salle
G	18	(Philippines)	Pong Escobal	6 ft 0 in (1.83 m)	179 lb (81 kg)		San Beda
PG	19	(Philippines)	Wynne Arboleda	5 ft 11 in (1.80 m)	162 lb (73 kg)		MLQU
PF	21	(Philippines)	Mark Isip	6 ft 4 in (1.93 m)	215 lb (98 kg)		Far Eastern
C	24	(Philippines)	Magi Sison (R)	6 ft 7 in (2.01 m)	210 lb (95 kg)		Philippines
PG	26	(Philippines)	Eric Salamat (R)	5 ft 10 in (1.78 m)	170 lb (77 kg)		Ateneo
F/C	31	(Philippines)	James Sena (R)	6 ft 4 in (1.93 m)	190 lb (86 kg)		José Rizal
F	32	(United States)	Zach Graham (I)	6 ft 5 in (1.96 m)	220 lb (100 kg)		Mississippi
SF	41	(Philippines)	Khasim Mirza	6 ft 4 in (1.93 m)	185 lb (84 kg)		UST

Head coach

- (Philippines) Franz Pumaren (De La Salle)

Assistant coach(es)

- (Philippines) Tonichi Yturri (De La Salle)
- (Philippines) Jack Santiago (De La Salle)
- (Philippines) Pocholo Villanueva (De La Salle)
- (Philippines) Dan Rose
- (Philippines) Joshua Villapando

Legend

- (C) Team captain
- (CI) Commissioner's Cup Import
- (GI) Governors' Cup Import
- (EI) EASL Import
- (DP) Unsigned draft pick
- (FA) Free agent
- (IN) Inactive
- (S) Suspended
- (R) Rookie
- Injured

== Philippine Cup ==
=== Eliminations ===
==== Standings ====
Pos	Team	W	L	PCT	GB	Qualification
1	B-Meg Llamados	10	4	.714 (Note: Head-to-head record: B-Meg 1–1 Talk 'N Text (B-Meg +8))	—	Twice-to-beat in the quarterfinals
2	Talk 'N Text Tropang Texters	10	4	.714	—	Twice-to-beat in the quarterfinals
3	Petron Blaze Boosters	9	5	.643 (Note: Head-to-head differential: Petron +8, Barangay Ginebra +1, Rain or Shine −9)	1	Best-of-three quarterfinals
4	Barangay Ginebra San Miguel	9	5	.643	1	Best-of-three quarterfinals
5	Rain or Shine Elasto Painters	9	5	.643	1	Best-of-three quarterfinals
6	Meralco Bolts	8	6	.571	2	Best-of-three quarterfinals
7	Barako Bull Energy Cola	6	8	.429 (Note: Head-to-head record: Barako Bull 1–1 Powerade (Barako Bull +35))	4	Twice-to-win in the quarterfinals
8	Powerade Tigers	6	8	.429	4	Twice-to-win in the quarterfinals
9	Alaska Aces	3	11	.214	7	
10	Shopinas.com Clickers	0	14	.000	10	

Source: PBA.ph

== Commissioner's Cup ==
=== Eliminations ===
==== Standings ====
Pos	Team	W	L	PCT	GB	Qualification
1	Talk 'N Text Tropang Texters	7	2	.778	—	Advance to semifinals
2	Barangay Ginebra Kings	6	3	.667 (Note: Second seed playoff: Barangay Ginebra 93–84 B-Meg)	1	Advance to semifinals
3	B-Meg Llamados	6	3	.667	1	Advance to quarterfinals
4	Alaska Aces	5	4	.556	2	Advance to quarterfinals
5	Barako Bull Energy Cola	4	5	.444 (Note: Head-to-head quotient: Barako Bull 1.04, Meralco 1.01, Powerade 0.95; sixth seed playoff: Meralco 102–98 Powerade)	3	Advance to quarterfinals
6	Meralco Bolts	4	5	.444	3	Advance to quarterfinals
7	Powerade Tigers	4	5	.444	3	
8	Rain or Shine Elasto Painters	3	6	.333 (Note: Head-to-head quotient: Rain or Shine 1.12, Petron 1.11, Air21 0.80)	4	
9	Petron Blaze Boosters	3	6	.333	4	
10	Air21 Express	3	6	.333	4	

Source: PBA.ph

== Governors Cup ==
=== Eliminations ===
==== Standings ====
Pos	Team	W	L	PCT	GB	Qualification
1	Rain or Shine Elasto Painters	8	1	.889	—	Semifinal round
2	B-Meg Llamados	6	3	.667	2	Semifinal round
3	Talk 'N Text Tropang Texters	5	4	.556 (Note: Head-to-head differential: Talk 'N Text +18, Barangay Ginebra 0, Petron −18)	3	Semifinal round
4	Barangay Ginebra Kings	5	4	.556	3	Semifinal round
5	Petron Blaze Boosters	5	4	.556	3	Semifinal round
6	Meralco Bolts	4	5	.444 (Note: Head-to-head differential: Meralco +11, Barako Bull +8, Powerade −18; sixth seed playoffs: Powerade 99–95 Barako Bull, Meralco 94–86 Powerade)	4	Semifinal round
7	Powerade Tigers	4	5	.444	4	
8	Barako Bull Energy Cola	4	5	.444	4	
9	Alaska Aces	2	7	.222 (Note: Head-to-head record: Alaska 1–0 Air21)	6	
10	Air21 Express	2	7	.222	6	

Source: PBA.ph

== Transactions ==
=== Trades ===
==== Pre-season ====
September 6, 2011	To Shopinas.com Elmer Espiritu(from Barako Bull); Brian Ilad (from B-Meg)	To Barako Bull Don Allado (from B-Meg) future second round pick (from B-Meg)	To B-Meg Mark Barroca (from Shopinas.com)

==== Commissioner's Cup ====
January 27, 2012	To Air21 Nelbert Omolon; Mark Isip	To Meralco Mark Canlas; Dennis Daa

==== Governors Cup ====
May 29, 2012	To Air21 Eric Salamat; 2012 2nd round pick	To Alaska RJ Jazul

June 7, 2012	To Air21 Wynne Arboleda	To Petron Blaze Jojo Duncil

=== Additions ===
Player	Signed	Former team
Nelbert Omolon	January 27, 2012(via trade)	Meralco Bolts
Mark Isip	January 27, 2012(via trade)	Meralco Bolts
Hyram Bagatsing	May 20, 2012	Free agent
Eric Salamat	May 27, 2012(via trade)	Alaska Aces
Wynne Arboleda	June 7, 2012(via trade)	Petron Blaze Boosters

=== Subtractions ===
Player	Signed	New team
Mark Canlas	January 27, 2012(via trade)	Meralco Bolts
Dennis Daa	January 27, 2012(via trade)	Meralco Bolts
RJ Jazul	May 27, 2012(via trade)	Alaska Aces
Jojo Duncil	June 7, 2012(via trade)	Petron Blaze Boosters

=== Recruited imports ===
Tournament	Name	Debuted	Last game	Record
Commissioner's Cup	Marcus Douthit	February 19 (vs. Barako Bull)	March 28 (vs. Barangay Ginebra)	3–6
Governors Cup	Zach Graham	May 23 (vs. Ginebra)	June 29 (vs. Petron Blaze)	2–7
