= Air21 Express draft history =

The Air21 Express first participated in the Philippine Basketball Association (PBA) draft as the Shopinas.com Clickers on August 28, 2011, one month before their first PBA season. The Clickers bought the original franchise of the Barako Bull Energy Boosters in 2011 when Barako Bull filed for leave of absence after the 2010-11 PBA Philippine Cup and eventually disbanded after the season ended. Shopinas.com received the rights for all of the Barako Bull's players and draftees. As an incentive of being a new franchise, the PBA Board of Governors gave Shopinas.com the 11th overall pick (first in the second round).

Mark Barocca became the team's first draft choice, the 5th pick in the 2011 PBA Draft. Barocca was later traded to the B-Meg Llamados, just two days after he was drafted.

The team was renamed as the Air21 Express after the 2011-12 PBA Philippine Cup.

== Selections ==
Basketball positions
PG	Point guard
SG	Shooting guard
SF	Small forward
PF	Power forward
C	Center

Draft	Round	Pick	Player	Position	Place of birth	School
2011	1	5	Mark Barroca	PG	Philippines	Far Eastern University
2011	2	11	Magi Sison	C	Philippines	UP Diliman
2011	3	21	Mark Cagoco	PG/SG	Philippines	Jose Rizal University
2012	2	11	Yousef Taha	G	Philippines	North Lake/Mapúa
2012	3	21	Simon Atkins	G	Philippines	De La Salle-Manila
2013	2	6	Eric Camson	SF	Philippines	Adamson
2013	3	1	Joshua Webb	SG/SF	Philippines	De La Salle
2013	4	1	Angelo Ingco		Philippines	De La Salle
2013	5	1	Randolph Chua			Saint Benilde

== Notes ==
1. All players entering the draft are Filipinos until proven otherwise.
