= List of Air21 Express seasons =

Legend
Champion

Runner-up

Semifinalist

This is a list of seasons by the Shopinas.com Clickers/Air21 Express franchise of the Philippine Basketball Association. For the records of the FedEx/Air21 Express team that exists from 2002 to 2011, see List of Barako Bull Energy seasons

== Season-by-season records ==
Season	Conference	Team name	Elimination round						Playoffs	
Season	Conference	Team name	Finish	GP	W	L	PCT	GB	Stage	Results
2011-12	Philippine	Shopinas.com Clickers	10th/10	14	0	14	.000	10	Did not qualify	
2011-12	Commissioner's	Air21 Express	10th/10	9	3	6	.333	4	Did not qualify	
2011-12	Governors'	Air21 Express	6th/10	9	2	7	.222	6	Did not qualify	
2012-13	Philippine	Air21 Express	8th/10	14	5	9	.357	7	Did not qualify	
2012-13	Commissioner's	Air21 Express	8th/10	14	6	8	.429	5	Quarterfinals	Alaska** 87, Air21 81
2012-13	Governors'	Air21 Express	10th/10	9	3	6	.333	5	Did not qualify	
2013-14	Philippine	Air21 Express	10th/10	14	3	11	.214	8	Did not qualify	
2013-14	Commissioner's	Air21 Express	7th/10	9	3	6	.333	6	Quarterfinals; Semifinals	Air21 def. San Miguel** in two games San Mig Super Coffee 3, Air21 2
2013-14	Governors'	Air21 Express	7th/10	9	5	4	.556	2	Quarterfinals	Rain or Shine** 111, Air21 90
Elimination round				101	30	71	.297	—	1 semifinal appearance	
Playoffs				10	4	6	.400	—	0 Finals appearances	
Cumulative records				111	34	77	.306	—	0 championships	

*one-game playoffs
**team had the twice-to-beat advantage

== Per season records ==
PBA season	Team season	GP	W	L	PCT	Best finish
2011–12	2011–12	32	5	27	.156	Elimination round
2012–13	2012–13	39	14	25	.359	Quarterfinalist
2013–14	2013–14	40	15	25	.375	Semifinalist
Total		159	70	89	.440	
