= Air21 Express =

Air21 Express may refer to

- Barako Bull Energy, Philippine basketball team named as "Air21 Express" from 2005 to 2009, and from 2010 to 2011
- Air21 Express (2012–2014), Philippine basketball team originally known as the "Shopinas.com Clickers"
