= Bryan Faundo =

Filipino basketball player

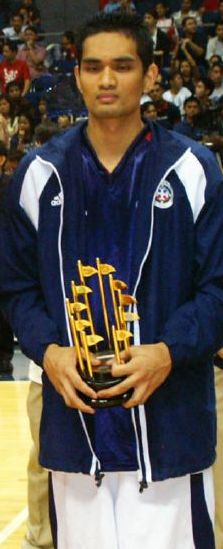
- Faundo in 2007

Free agent
- Position: Center / power forward

Personal information
- Born: February 18, 1984 (age 42) Sison, Pangasinan, Philippines
- Listed height: 6 ft 6 in (1.98 m)
- Listed weight: 225 lb (102 kg)

Career information
- College: Letran
- PBA draft: 2009: Undrafted
- Playing career: 2009–present

Career history
- 2009–2010: Barako Energy Coffee Masters
- 2010–2011: Brunei Barracudas
- 2011–2012: Meralco Bolts
- 2012: Air21 Express
- 2012–2013: Petron Blaze Boosters
- 2013: GlobalPort Batang Pier
- 2013–2014: Barangay Ginebra San Miguel
- 2014–2015: Blackwater Elite
- 2015–2020: Meralco Bolts
- 2021: Phoenix Super LPG Fuel Masters
- 2021: Bulacan Kuyas
- 2022: Alaska Aces
- 2022–2023: Boracay Islanders
- 2023–2024: Imus SV Squad

Career highlights
- NCAA Philippines champion (2005); NCAA Philippines Mytical Team (2007); NCAA Philippines Most Improved Player (2007)

Bryan C. Faundo (born February 18, 1984) is a Filipino professional basketball player who last played for the Imus SV Squad of the Maharlika Pilipinas Basketball League (MPBL).

== College career ==
In the NCAA, he was one of the key players for the Letran Knights that helped the team win the 2005-06 Championship. While in Letran, Faundo was also teammates with future PBA players RJ Jazul and Rey Guevarra. Together, they led the Knights to another finals appearance in 2007, but lost to rivals San Beda Red Lions.

== Professional career ==
Faundo was not drafted in 2009. He was signed by Barako Energy Coffee Masters. As a rookie, he played sparingly in 20 games. He averaged 1.9 points, 2.1 rebounds and 0.2 assists in 10.3 minutes.

On 2010, Faundo was signed by ASEAN Basketball League club Brunei Barracudas as an import for the 2010–11 ABL season.

He was signed by the Meralco Bolts to a six-month contract.

In November 2012, Faundo was signed by Petron Blaze Boosters. He was traded to Barangay Ginebra for Eric Menk.

Faundo was picked by expansion team Blackwater Elite ninth overall in the 2014 PBA Expansion Draft. With the Elite, he had his best season in the professional ranks, averaging career-highs in minutes (25.0 minutes per game), points (9.6 points per game), and rebounds (5.8 rebounds per game) and was one of the top five centers in the 2014–15 season based on player efficiency rating.

Faundo was signed by the Meralco Bolts from Blackwater after his contract expired, marking his return to the team since playing for them from 2011 to 2012.

== PBA career statistics ==
Legend
GP	Games played	MPG	Minutes per game
FG%	Field-goal percentage	3P%	3-point field-goal percentage	FT%	Free-throw percentage
RPG	Rebounds per game	APG	Assists per game	SPG	Steals per game
BPG	Blocks per game	PPG	Points per game	**Bold**	Career high

As of the end of 2021 season

=== Season-by-season averages ===
Year	Team	GP	MPG	FG%	3P%	FT%	RPG	APG	SPG	BPG	PPG
2009–10	Barako Energy	20	10.4	.373	.000	.250	2.2	.3	.0	**.3**	2.0
2011–12	Meralco	16	8.6	.436	—	.333	1.3	.1	.1	**.3**	2.2
2011–12	Air21	16	8.6	.436	—	.333	1.3	.1	.1	**.3**	2.2
2012–13	Petron	14	11.8	.425	—	.846	**2.6**	.3	**.4**	.1	3.2
2012–13	GlobalPort	14	11.8	.425	—	.846	**2.6**	.3	**.4**	.1	3.2
2013–14	Barangay Ginebra	6	2.3	**.500**	—	—	1.5	.0	.0	.0	1.0
2014–15	Blackwater	27	**25.0**	.486	.000	.810	**5.8**	**.9**	.1	.1	**9.6**
2015–16	Meralco	**50**	13.2	.458	—	**.875**	2.4	.7	.0	.1	4.6
2016–17	Meralco	26	6.4	.429	.000	.500	1.3	.1	.0	.1	1.7
2017–18	Meralco	18	8.2	.400	**.500**	.000	1.7	.3	.2	.1	2.5
2019	Meralco	37	10.1	.434	.250	.429	1.7	.3	.1	.2	3.2
2020	Meralco	10	10.1	.333	.000	.000	2.5	.5	.0	.2	2.4
2021	Phoenix Super LPG	11	8.3	.478	.000	.400	2.1	.3	.0	.1	2.2
2021	Alaska	11	8.3	.478	.000	.400	2.1	.3	.0	.1	2.2
Career		235	11.6	.446	.167	.704	2.4	.4	.1	.2	3.7
