= Mac Baracael =

Filipino basketball player (born 1985)

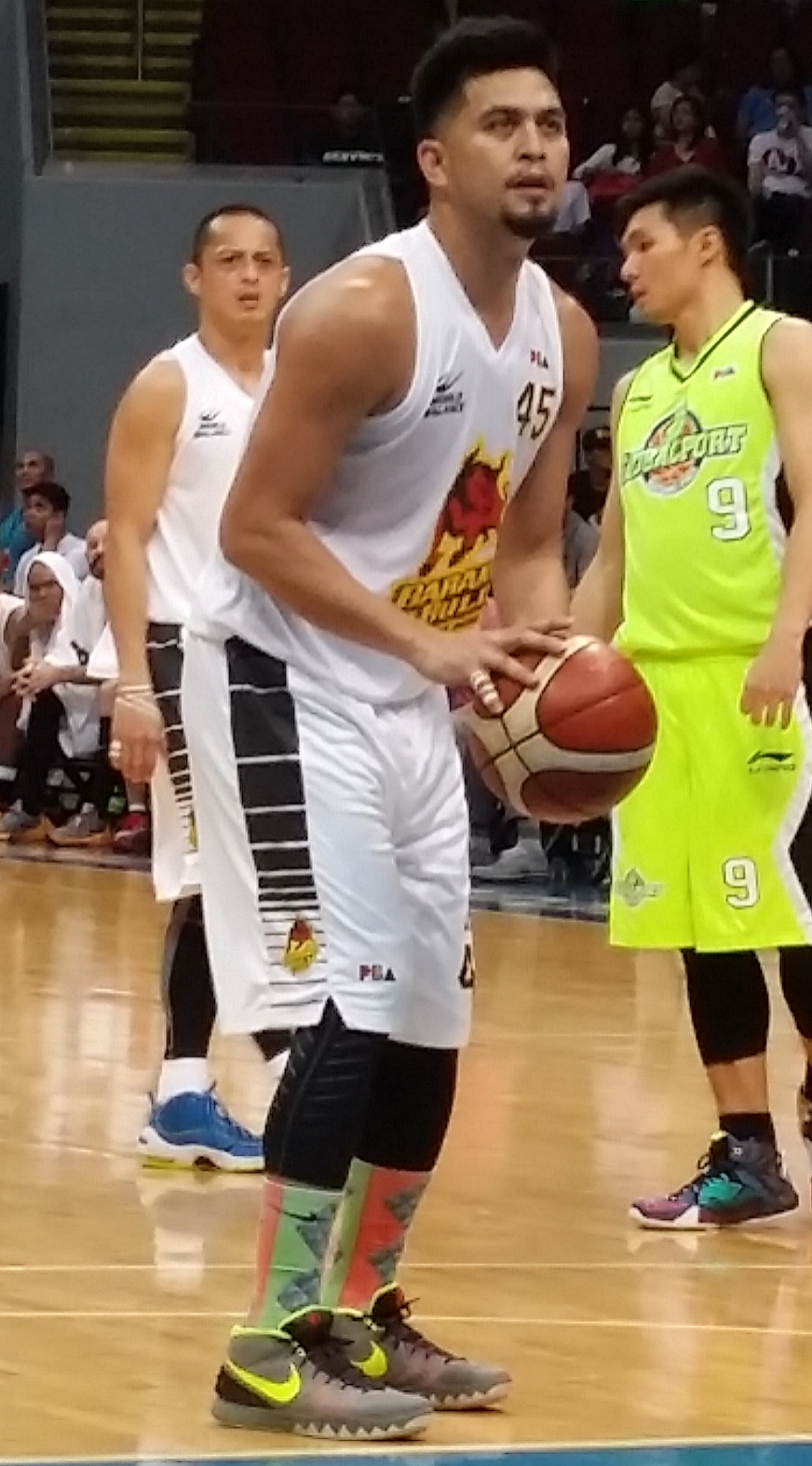
- Baracael with Barako Bull Energy in 2015

Free agent
- Position: Small forward

Personal information
- Born: April 14, 1985 (age 41) Tagkawayan, Quezon, Philippines
- Listed height: 6 ft 4 in (1.93 m)
- Listed weight: 205 lb (93 kg)

Career information
- College: FEU
- PBA draft: 2011: 1st round, 6th overall pick
- Drafted by: Alaska Aces
- Playing career: 2011–present

Career history
- 2011–2013: Alaska Aces
- 2013–2015: Barangay Ginebra San Miguel
- 2015–2016: Barako Bull Energy
- 2016: Phoenix Fuel Masters
- 2016–2017: NLEX Road Warriors
- 2017: GlobalPort Batang Pier
- 2017–2018: Meralco Bolts
- 2019–2020: Mindoro Tamaraws
- 2021–2022: MisOr–Brew Authoritea / GlobalPort ZValientes–MisOr / MisOr Kuyamis
- 2022: Pilipinas Aguilas
- 2022–2023: Quezon City Beacons
- 2023–2024: Caloocan Batang Kankaloo
- 2024: Pangasinan Heatwaves

Career highlights
- 2× PBA All-Star (2012, 2014)

Marnel "Mac" Baracael (born April 14, 1985) is a Filipino professional basketball player who last played for the Pangasinan Heatwaves of the Maharlika Pilipinas Basketball League (MPBL). Baracael was drafted sixth overall by the Alaska Aces in the 2011 PBA draft. Baracael played college basketball for Far Eastern University of the University Athletic Association of the Philippines (UAAP).

== Amateur career ==
Baracael was a former cager of MSEUF. In 2006, Baracael, also known as “Macmac”, transferred to Far Eastern University of the UAAP. After serving his residency, he became part of the FEU Tamaraws Senior basketball team on the account of his agility, one-on-one defense and outside shooting.

=== Shooting/apparent attempted assassination ===
On July 24, 2008, Baracael was shot by an unidentified assailant. He was walking outside the FEU campus in front of a PhilTrust Bank branch, in the corner of Morayta and R. Papa St. Marnel, Barcael was with his teammates Ron Cabagnot and Robert Kave when the suspect fired two gunshots. One bullet hit the left side of the player's back and the bullet exited from the lower portion of his nipple. Baracael was rushed to the Mary Chiles Hospital but was later on transferred to Capitol Medical Center. Allegedly, he was shot not only to warn him or scare him but it was intended to put the player to complete silence. Motives behind the attempted assassination are still unknown, but it was believed that the incident was related to a game-fixing issue that Baracael said to have reported earlier to FEU management.

== Smart Gilas ==
Alongside his FEU teammates Mark Barroca and Aldrech Ramos, Baracael was part of the roster of the national team, Smart Gilas, headed by coach Rajko Toroman. He led the team in scoring to help Smart Gilas finish second place in the 22nd Dubai Invitational Basketball Tournament.

== PBA career ==
=== Alaska Aces ===
He along with 33 other rookies led by teammate JVee Casio applied for the draft. On draft day, he was taken 6th overall by the Alaska. He then signed a three-year deal with the team. In his official debut as a professional in the PBA, Baracael led the scoring for Alaska with 20 points, 2 rebounds and 3 assists in an 83–72 loss against the Barangay Ginebra Kings.

=== Barangay Ginebra San Miguel ===
In January 2013, Baracael was traded to Barangay Ginebra in a 5-team, 10-player deal.

=== Barako Bull Energy ===
On September 28, 2015, Baracael was traded to the Barako Bull Energy in a three-team trade that also involved the Star Hotshots.

=== NLEX Road Warriors ===
On May 5, 2016, Baracael, Emman Monfort and a 2018 second-round pick was traded by the Phoenix Fuel Masters to the NLEX Road Warriors for Simon Enciso and Mark Borboran.

== PBA career statistics ==
Legend
GP	Games played	MPG	Minutes per game
FG%	Field-goal percentage	3P%	3-point field-goal percentage	FT%	Free-throw percentage
RPG	Rebounds per game	APG	Assists per game	SPG	Steals per game
BPG	Blocks per game	PPG	Points per game	**Bold**	Career high

Correct as of September 23, 2016

=== Season-by-season averages ===
Year	Team	GP	MPG	FG%	3P%	FT%	RPG	APG	SPG	BPG	PPG
2011–12	Alaska	35	**23.8**	**.412**	.312	**.785**	**3.4**	1.1	.2	**.1**	**9.0**
2012–13	Alaska	**57**	21.8	.388	.330	.780	2.7	1.0	.2	.0	8.2
2013–14	Barangay Ginebra	42	20.9	.368	.348	.711	2.0	**1.2**	**.3**	**.1**	7.2
2014–15	Barangay Ginebra	33	20.6	.379	**.358**	.600	2.9	**1.2**	.2	**.1**	7.0
2015–16	Barako Bull / Phoenix / NLEX	34	16.4	.397	.317	.711	2.2	.8	.2	**.1**	6.4
Career		201	20.8	.389	.337	.738	2.6	1.1	.2	.1	7.6
