= Mark Canlas =

Filipino basketball player (born 1986)

Personal information
- Born: June 15, 1986 (age 40) Pampanga, Philippines
- Listed height: 6 ft 5 in (1.96 m)
- Listed weight: 200 lb (91 kg)

Career information
- High school: Don Bosco (Mabalacat, Pampanga)
- College: UST
- PBA draft: 2011: Undrafted
- Playing career: 2011–2012
- Position: Forward

Career history
- 2011–2012: Shopinas.com Clickers
- 2012: Meralco Bolts

Mark Angelo C. Canlas (born June 15, 1986, in Pampanga) is a Filipino former professional basketball player. He was undrafted in the 2011. He was signed by the Clickers before the season began. He was a member of the UST Growling Tigers who won the UAAP title in 2006.

== College career ==
Canlas played for the UST Growling Tigers men's senior basketball team in the University Athletic Association of the Philippines from 2005 to 2008. In 2006, he was one of the members of Growling Tigers who won the title against the heavily favored Ateneo Blue Eagles 2–1.

== Shopinas.com Clickers ==
He was undrafted in the 2011 PBA Draft but was signed by Shopinas.com
