= Jason Ballesteros =

Filipino basketball player (born 1985)

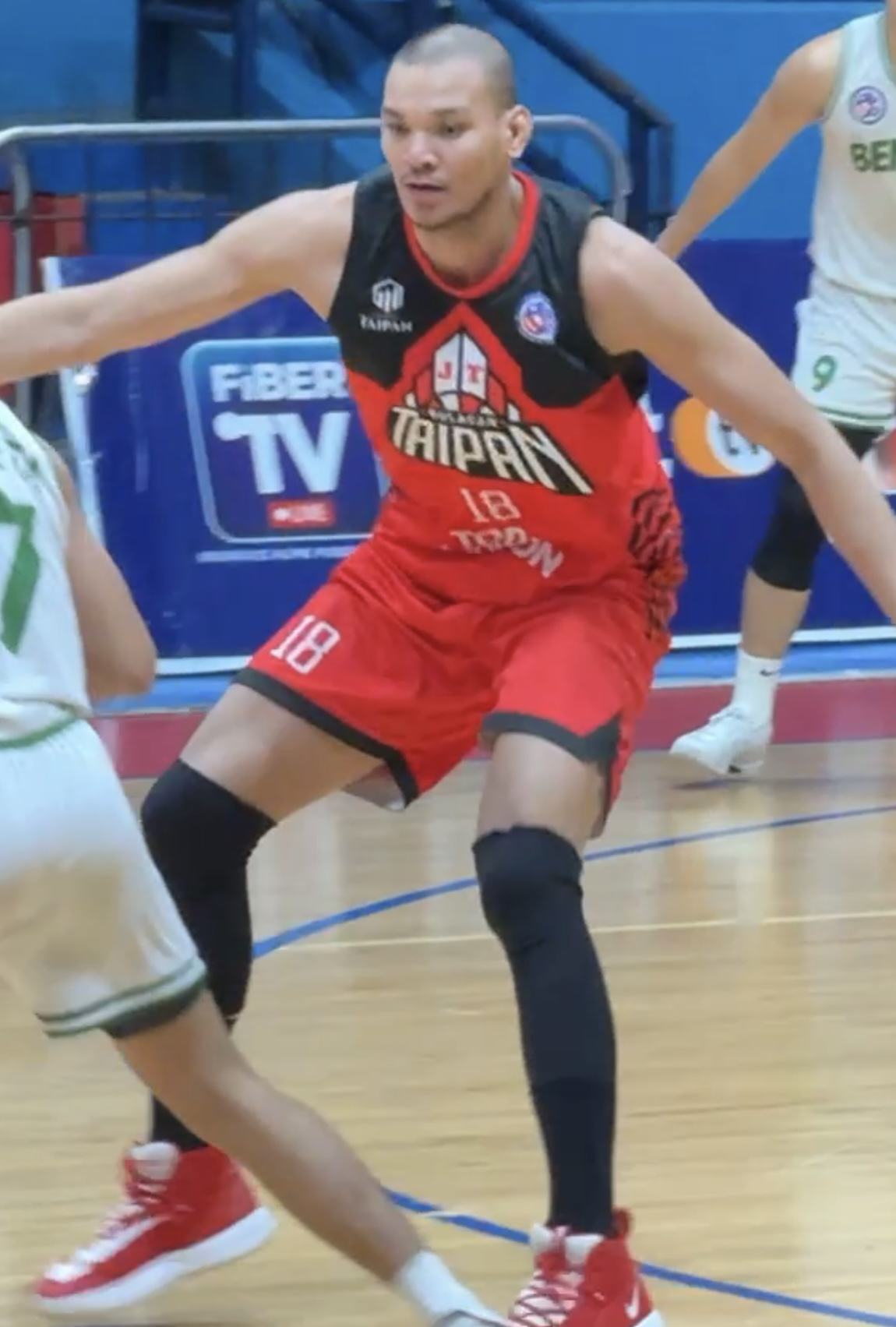
- Ballesteros with the JT Bulacan Taipan in 2024

No. 18 – Biñan Tatak Gel
- Position: Center
- League: MPBL

Personal information
- Born: October 7, 1985 (age 41) Basista, Pangasinan, Philippines
- Listed height: 6 ft 6 in (1.98 m)
- Listed weight: 246 lb (112 kg)

Career information
- College: San Sebastian
- PBA draft: 2011: 1st round, 7th overall pick
- Drafted by: Meralco Bolts
- Playing career: 2011–present

Career history
- 2011–2012: Meralco Bolts
- 2012–2013: Barako Bull Energy
- 2013–2014: Jumbo Plastic Linoleum Giants
- 2014: Meralco Bolts
- 2014–2016: Blackwater Elite
- 2016–2017: Mahindra Enforcer / Mahindra Floodbuster / Kia Picanto
- 2017–2020: Meralco Bolts
- 2021–2022: MisOr–Brew Authoritea / GlobalPort ZValientes–MisOr
- 2022: Pasig City MCW Sports
- 2022–2023: Koponang Lakan ng Bulacan
- 2023: Pasig City MCW Sports
- 2023–2024: JT Bulacan Taipan
- 2024: Quezon City Toda Aksyon
- 2024–present: Biñan Tatak Gel

Career highlights
- 2× MPBL All-Star (2023, 2024); MPBL Defensive Player of the Year (2023); NCAA Philippines Mythical Five (2008); 2× NCAA Philippines Defensive Player of the Year (2007, 2008)

Jason Ballesteros (born October 7, 1985) is a Filipino professional basketball player for the Biñan Tatak Gel of the Maharlika Pilipinas Basketball League (MPBL). He was drafted seventh by the Meralco Bolts in the 2011 PBA draft. He has also played for Smart Gilas.

== College career ==
Ballesteros played college basketball for the San Sebastian Stags where he became the team's starting center. While playing for San Sebastian, he was known as one of NCAA Philippines' top defensive players, winning the Defensive Player of the Year award twice, in 2007 and 2008. He also made the league's Mythical Five team in his final season in 2008.

== Professional career ==
=== Meralco Bolts ===
In 2011, Ballesteros applied for that year's PBA Draft. During the PBA rookie camp, he was measured as the second tallest applicant at 6’6 ¼”, but had the longest wingspan at 82 inches. He was drafted by Meralco Bolts seventh overall in the 2011 PBA draft that also featured his former Smart Gilas teammates. He was given a two-year contract.

=== Barako Bull ===
Weeks before the start of the 38th PBA season, he was traded to Barako Bull in exchange for Carlo Sharma and 3-point bomber Sunday Salvacion.

=== Jumbo Plastic Linoleum Giants ===
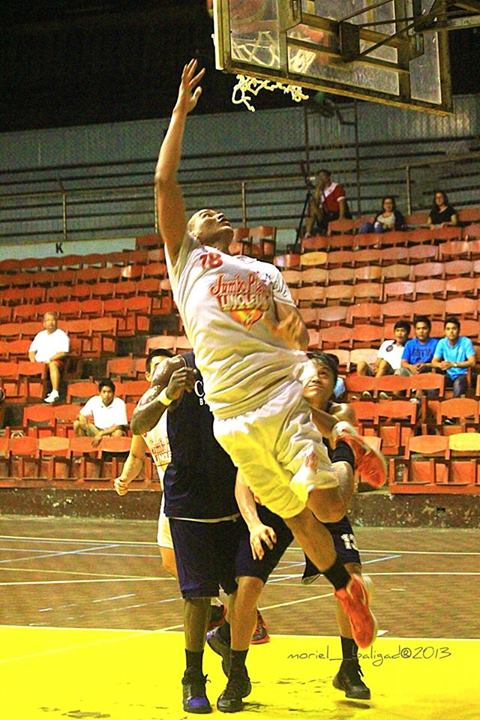
Ballesteros with the Jumbo Plastic Linoleum Giants in 2013

In 2013, Ballesteros suffered a knee muscle injury that made him consider retirement for four months. He made his return to basketball with the Jumbo Plastic Linoleum Giants in the PBA D-League. There, he would consistently put up double-doubles and lead his team to a semifinals appearance.

=== Second stint with Meralco ===
In February 2014, San Miguel Beermen signed Ballesteros to a two-year deal, but never played a game for them and was released before the Governors' Cup. The Meralco Bolts re-signed him for the rest of the season.

=== Blackwater Elite ===
On September 12, 2014, he and Salvacion were sent to Blackwater Elite in a three-way trade involving NLEX Road Warriors and Meralco Bolts. NLEX obtained Blackwater's 2016 and 2017 2nd-round pick along with the draft rights for Juneric Baloria. Meralco received Sean Anthony from NLEX via Blackwater as third party.

=== Mahindra franchise ===
On March 20, 2016, Ballesteros was traded to Mahindra Enforcer for Kyle Pascual. He was cut by the team in 2017.

=== Third stint with Meralco ===
Ballesteros found his way back to Meralco for a third time. In a 2017–18 Philippine Cup win against the Phoenix Fuel Masters, he had 12 rebounds. He then followed it up with 17 rebounds and played clutch defense against Japeth Aguilar in a win over Barangay Ginebra.

=== MisOr–Brew Authoritea ===
In 2021, Ballesteros played for MisOr–Brew Authoritea in the VisMin Super Cup. He got Player of the Game honors in a win over Basilan BRT in which he had six blocks and 14 rebounds. Despite being the top-seeded team that season, they were upset by the Zamboanga Sibugay Warriors.

=== Pasig City / MCW Sports ===
Ballesteros then played for Pasig City MCW Sports in the Maharlika Pilipinas Basketball League (MPBL). He had a double-double of 11 points and 10 rebounds in an overtime win over the Bacoor City Strikers. They got eliminated during the North semifinals by the San Juan Knights.

=== Koponang Lakan ng Bulacan ===
In between MPBL seasons, Ballesteros played for Koponang Lakan ng Bulacan in the Pilipinas Super League (PSL). Against the Sta. Rosa Laguna Lions, he made two free throws with .7 seconds remaining to win the game. He hit another game-winning free throw against Quezon City for 13 points with nine rebounds.

=== Second stint with Pasig City ===
Ballesteros returned to Pasig for his 2nd season. He had nine points and 16 rebounds in a win over the Marikina Shoemasters. That season, he was selected as an MPBL All-Star. He was able to lead Pasig to the playoffs as a fifth seed despite him and Josan Nimes being the only PBA veterans on the team. In Game 3 of the first round, he was able to grab 17 rebounds, but they lost to the Caloocan Batang Kankaloo and were eliminated. He was awarded as the league's Defensive Player of the Year.

== International career ==
Ballesteros played for Smart Gilas, the Philippine national team, and was one of the Smart Gilas' pioneers. Of all the big men from the first Gilas team, he stayed with the team the longest, from its creation in 2008 until 2011, when he was drafted to the PBA.

== PBA career statistics ==
Legend
GP	Games played	MPG	Minutes per game
FG%	Field-goal percentage	3P%	3-point field-goal percentage	FT%	Free-throw percentage
RPG	Rebounds per game	APG	Assists per game	SPG	Steals per game
BPG	Blocks per game	PPG	Points per game	**Bold**	Career high

As of the end of 2020 season

=== Season-by-season averages ===
Year	Team	GP	MPG	FG%	3P%	FT%	RPG	APG	SPG	BPG	PPG
2011–12	Meralco	16	8.7	.400	—	.222	2.8	.1	.0	.3	.9
2012–13	Barako Bull	9	10.3	.300	—	.500	3.9	.1	.1	**.8**	1.9
2013–14	Meralco	3	12.7	**.667**	—	.778	2.3	**.7**	**.7**	.3	**3.7**
2014–15	Blackwater	27	14.0	.518	—	.667	**4.4**	.5	.5	.7	2.4
2015–16	Blackwater	29	12.5	.575	—	.464	4.0	.2	.2	**.8**	2.3
2015–16	Mahindra	29	12.5	.575	—	.464	4.0	.2	.2	**.8**	2.3
2016–17	Mahindra / Kia	**32**	**15.5**	.477	—	.727	4.3	.2	.1	.7	1.8
2017–18	Meralco	20	11.8	.538	—	**.800**	4.1	.2	.1	.6	1.8
Career		136	12.8	.498	—	.592	4.0	.2	.2	.6	2.0
