= Pong Escobal =

Filipino basketball player

Personal information
- Born: July 7, 1985 (age 41) Davao City, Philippines
- Listed height: 5 ft 11 in (1.80 m)
- Listed weight: 180 lb (82 kg)

Career information
- High school: Stella Maris Academy of Davao (Davao City)
- College: San Beda
- PBA draft: 2008: 2nd round, 11th overall pick
- Drafted by: Talk 'N Text Tropang Texters
- Playing career: 2008–2012
- Position: Point guard

Career history
- 2008–2010: Talk 'N Text Tropang Texters
- 2010: Sta. Lucia Realtors
- 2010–2011: Meralco Bolts
- 2011: B-Meg Llamados
- 2011–2012: Shopinas.com Clickers

John Paul P. Escobal, also known as Pong Escobal (born July 7, 1985, in Davao City) is a Filipino former professional basketball player who last played for the Air21 Express in the Philippine Basketball Association (PBA). He played in San Beda's back-to-back-to-back titles in the NCAA. He was the 11th draft pick of Talk 'N Text Tropang Texters in the 2008 PBA Draft.

== PBA career statistics ==
Legend
GP	Games played	MPG	Minutes per game
FG%	Field-goal percentage	3P%	3-point field-goal percentage	FT%	Free-throw percentage
RPG	Rebounds per game	APG	Assists per game	SPG	Steals per game
BPG	Blocks per game	PPG	Points per game	**Bold**	Career high

=== Season-by-season averages ===
Year	Team	GP	MPG	FG%	3P%	FT%	RPG	APG	SPG	BPG	PPG
2008–09	Talk 'N Text	11	3.6	.400	.333	**1.000**	.4	.6	.0	.0	.6
2009–10	Talk 'N Text	**23**	**17.0**	**.425**	.397	.700	1.5	**1.4**	**.2**	.0	**5.9**
2009–10	Sta. Lucia	**23**	**17.0**	**.425**	.397	.700	1.5	**1.4**	**.2**	.0	**5.9**
2010–11	Meralco	21	14.1	.385	.316	**1.000**	**1.7**	1.1	.1	.0	3.2
2010–11	B-Meg Derby Ace	21	14.1	.385	.316	**1.000**	**1.7**	1.1	.1	.0	3.2
2011–12	Shopinas.com / Air21	19	12.9	.359	**.417**	.571	1.4	**1.4**	**.2**	**.1**	4.2
2012–13	Barako Bull	5	7.8	.286	.167	.500	.6	.6	.0	.0	2.0
Career		79	12.8	.391	.370	.677	1.3	1.1	.1	.0	3.8
