= Gilbert Bulawan =

Filipino basketball player

Personal information
- Born: August 25, 1986 Legazpi, Albay, Philippines
- Died: July 3, 2016 (aged 29) Quezon City, Philippines
- Listed height: 6 ft 5 in (1.96 m)
- Listed weight: 195 lb (88 kg)

Career information
- College: San Sebastian
- PBA draft: 2011: 2nd round, 17th overall pick
- Drafted by: Alaska Aces
- Playing career: 2011–2016
- Position: Power forward / center
- Number: 11

Career history
- 2011–2013: Meralco Bolts
- 2013–2014: Barako Bull Energy Cola
- 2014–2016: Blackwater Elite

Career highlights
- No. 11 retired by Blackwater Elite; NCAA Philippines champion (2009)

Gilbert Domingo Bulawan (August 25, 1986 – July 3, 2016) was a Filipino professional basketball player who played for the Meralco Bolts, Barako Bull Energy Cola and Blackwater Elite of the Philippine Basketball Association (PBA). He was drafted 17th overall in the 2011 PBA draft by the Alaska Aces.

== College career ==
Bulawan played for the San Sebastian College–Recoletos men's senior basketball team from 2006 to 2010. In Season 85, He was one of the members of the San Sebastian Stags who won the title against then three-time defending champions San Beda Red Lions in a sweep 2–0.

== Professional career ==
After Bulawan has finished his college career, he decided to apply for the 2011 PBA draft. In the draft, he was drafted 17th overall by the Aces before being traded to the Bolts. In June 2013, Bulawan was traded to Barako Bull Energy Cola from Meralco in a three-team trade that also sent Jared Dillinger and Don Allado to Meralco. Later in the 2014 season, Bulawan was one of the players dropped by Barako, allowing him to join the 2014 PBA Expansion Draft, where he was picked 15th by Blackwater.

== Death ==
On July 3, 2016, Bulawan died after collapsing while on team practice with Blackwater Elite. He was declared dead on arrival at Capitol Medical Center in Quezon City. Bulawan is the youngest and very first active player to die in the PBA.

The autopsy said that Bulawan suffered from enlargement of the heart. Bulawan had a rare condition, atherosclerosis, which was rare enough that ECG tests and numerous team medical checks were unable to reveal his condition. Blackwater Elite owner Dioceldo Sy had asked the PBA for a small ceremony on its first game on the 2016 Governors' Cup for the retirement of Bulawan's jersey, #11.

== PBA career statistics ==
Legend
GP	Games played	MPG	Minutes per game
FG%	Field-goal percentage	3P%	3-point field-goal percentage	FT%	Free-throw percentage
RPG	Rebounds per game	APG	Assists per game	SPG	Steals per game
BPG	Blocks per game	PPG	Points per game	**Bold**	Career high

=== Season-by-season averages ===
Year	Team	GP	MPG	FG%	3P%	FT%	RPG	APG	SPG	BPG	PPG
2011–12	Meralco	11	11.6	**.455**	.000	**.667**	**2.4**	.2	.2	.1	**4.2**
2012–13	Meralco / Barako Bull	13	5.8	.308	.000	.500	1.1	.0	.0	.1	.7
2014–15	Blackwater	**19**	**16.9**	.409	**.333**	.529	2.3	**.7**	**.3**	**.3**	3.4
2015–16	Blackwater	9	8.2	.235	.000	.500	1.9	.0	.1	.0	1.3
Career		52	11.5	.393	.167	.556	1.9	.3	.2	.1	2.5

== See also ==
- List of basketball players who died during their careers
