= 2011 PBA draft =

Player selection in Philippine basketball

General information
- Date(s): August 28, 2011
- Time: 4:00 pm (PHT)
- Location: Robinsons Place Manila
- Network(s): AKTV

Overview
- League: Philippine Basketball Association
- First selection: JVee Casio, Powerade Tigers

The 2011 Philippine Basketball Association (PBA) rookie draft was an event at which teams drafted players from the amateur ranks. The event was held at Robinson's Place Ermita in Manila on August 28, 2011. Players who applied for the draft underwent a rookie camp that lasted a week.

== Draft lottery ==
The lottery was held on August 6, 2011, before the start of the 2011 PBA Governors Cup Finals at the Smart Araneta Coliseum in Quezon City. The Powerade Tigers beat the statistical odds by winning the first overall pick against the Air21 Express (renamed as Barako Bull Energy starting the 2011-12 season). From this year on, as opposed in having the draft last two rounds as what was done from 2005 to 2010, the league allowed the draft to continue until all teams have passed.

== Draft ==
PG	Point guard	SG	Shooting guard	SF	Small forward	PF	Power forward	C	Center	*	Mythical team member	^{#}	All-star

=== 1st round ===
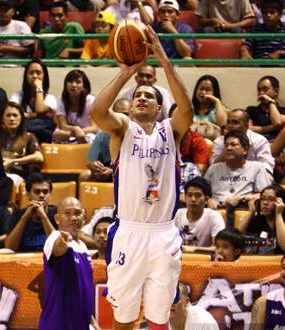
Marcio Lassiter was selected 4th by the Powerade Tigers.

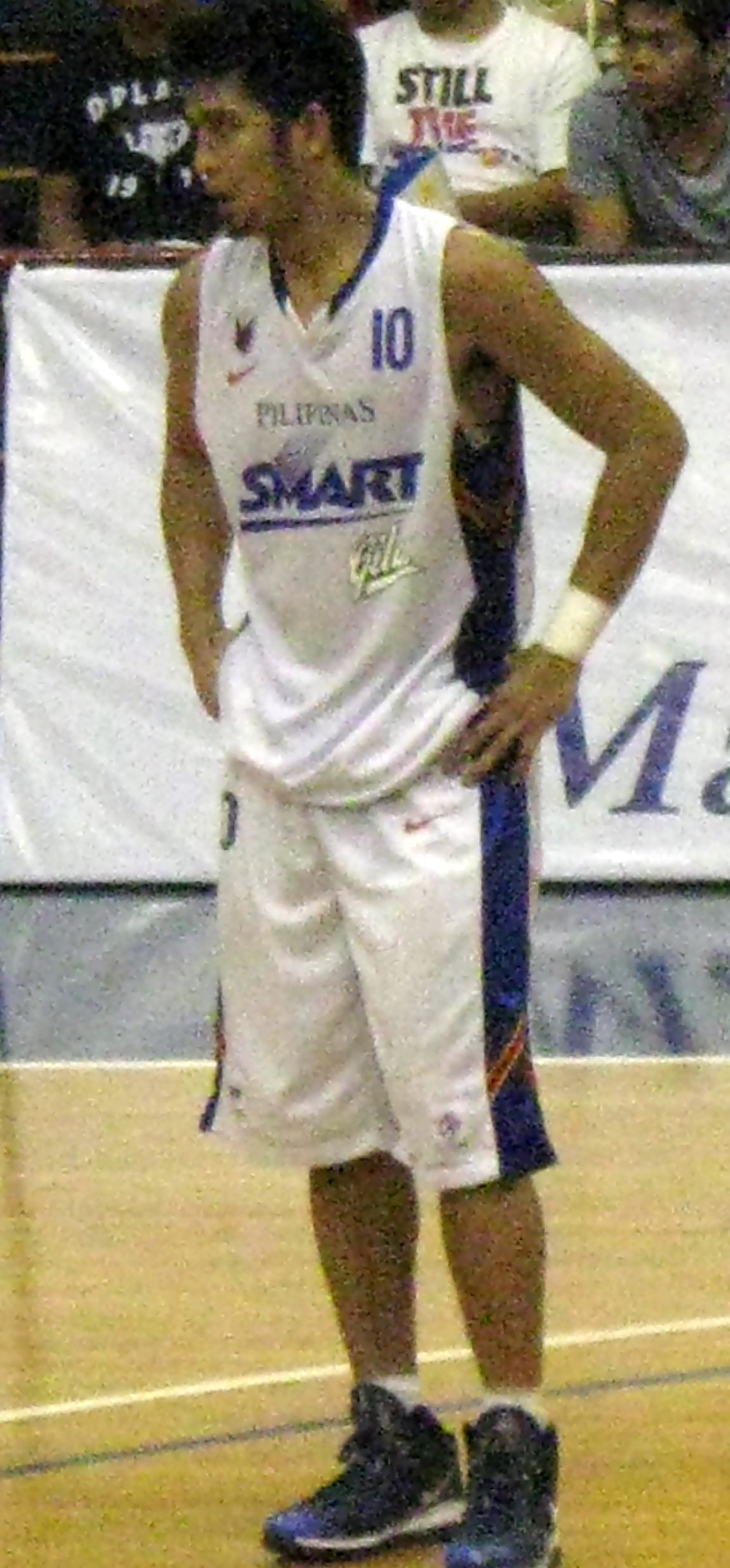
Mac Baracael was selected 6th by the Alaska Aces.

Round	Pick	Player	Position	Country of origin*	Team	College
1	1	#JVee Casio	PG	Philippines	Powerade Tigers	De La Salle University
1	2	*Paul Lee	SG/PG	Philippines	Rain or Shine Elasto Painters (from Barako Bull Energy)^{[a]}	University of the East
1	3	#Chris Lutz	SF	United States	Barako Bull Energy (from Meralco, traded to Petron Blaze Boosters^{[A]})^{[b]}	Marshall University
1	4	*Marcio Lassiter	SF/SG	United States	Powerade Tigers (from Rain or Shine Elasto Painters)^{[c]}	Cal State Fullerton
1	5	*Mark Barroca	PG	Philippines	Shopinas.com Clickers (from B-Meg Llamados)^{[d]}	Far Eastern University
1	6	#Mac Baracael	SF/PF	Philippines	Alaska Aces	Far Eastern University
1	7	Jason Ballesteros	C	Philippines	Meralco Bolts (from Talk 'N Text Tropang Texters via Shopinas.com Clickers*)^{[e]}	San Sebastian
1	8	#Allein Maliksi	SF	Philippines	Petron Blaze Boosters (traded to Barako Bull Energy^{[A]})	UST
1	9	Reil Cervantes	PF	Philippines	Barangay Ginebra Kings	Far Eastern University
1	10	#Dylan Ababou	SF/SG	Philippines	Barako Bull Energy (from Talk 'N Text Tropang Texters)^{[f]}	UST

=== 2nd round ===
Round	Pick	Player	Position	Country of origin*	Team	College
2	1	Magi Sison	C	Philippines	Shopinas.com Clickers^{a}	UP Diliman
2	2	Pamboy Raymundo	PG	Philippines	Talk 'N Text Tropang Texters (from Barako Bull Energy)^{[g]}	San Sebastian
2	3	Eric Salamat	SG/PG	Philippines	Alaska Aces (from Rain or Shine Elasto Painters via Powerade Tigers)^{[h]}	Ateneo
2	4	Julius Pasculado	SG/PG	Philippines	Alaska Aces (from Rain or Shine Elasto Painters and Powerade Tigers via Meralco Bolts)^{[i]}	Wilbur Wright
2	5	Ariel Mepaña	PF	Philippines	Alaska Aces (from Rain or Shine Elasto Painters)^{[j]}	UV
2	6	Brian Ilad	PF/C	Philippines	B-Meg Llamados	De La Salle
2	7	Gilbert Bulawan	PF	Philippines	Alaska Aces (traded to Meralco Bolts^{[B]})	San Sebastian
2	8	James Martinez	PG/SG	Philippines	Barangay Ginebra Kings (from Shopinas.com Clickers*)^{[k]}	UE
2	9	Kenneth Acibar	PF/C	Philippines	Barako Bull Energy (from Petron Blaze Boosters)^{[l]}	UE
2	10	Paul Sorongon	SG	Philippines	Barako Bull Energy (from Barangay Ginebra Kings)^{[m]}	UP Diliman
2	11	John Marc Agustin	SF	Philippines	Powerade Tigers (from Talk 'N Text Tropang Texters)^{[e]}	Adamson

=== 3rd round ===
Round	Pick	Player	Position	Country of origin*	Team	College
3	1	Mark Cagoco	PG/SG	Philippines	Shopinas.com Clickers	Jose Rizal University
3	2	Filemon Fernandez	PG/SG	United States	Petron Blaze Boosters	Orange Coast College

Note: Powerade, Barako Bull, Meralco, Rain or Shine, B-Meg, Alaska, Barangay Ginebra and Talk 'N Text passed in this round.

=== 4th round ===
Round	Pick	Player	Position	Country of origin*	Team	College
4	1	Gerald Lapus	PF	Philippines	Petron Blaze Boosters	Arellano University

Note: Shopinas.com passed in this round.

=== Notes ===
- ^a Given by the PBA board to the Shopinas.com Clickers as an incentive for purchasing the old Barako Bull franchise.

== Trades involving draft picks ==
=== Pre-draft trades ===
Prior to the day of the draft, the following trades were made and resulted in exchanges of draft picks between the teams.

- ^{a} ^{b} On January 20, 2011, in a three-team trade, Rain or Shine acquired a first round pick, a 2013 first round pick, Ronjay Buenafe and Ronnie Matias from Barako Bull (as Air21) and Beau Belga from Meralco, the Express acquired Reed Juntilla, a second round pick and a 2013 second round pick from the Bolts, and the Bolts acquired Sol Mercado and Paolo Bugia from the Elasto Painters and Erick Rodriguez from the Express.
- ^{c} On September 16, 2010, Powerade acquired a first round pick and Eddie Laure in exchange for Larry Rodriguez.
- ^{d} On August 26, 2011, B-Meg re-acquired a first round pick from Shopinas in exchange for two future second round draft picks. Previously, the Red Bull Barako acquired the pick on October 31, 2008, from B-Meg (as Purefoods) in exchange for Rich Alvarez. Red Bull's franchise was sold to Shopinas in the 2011 off-season.
- ^{e 1} ^{2} On August 28, 2011, in a three-team trade, Talk 'N Text acquired Bam Gamalinda and Shawn Weinstein from Meralco, the Bolts acquired Mark Yee from the Tropang Texters and a first round pick and Mark Macapagal from Powerade, and the Tigers acquired Chris Timberlake and Ogie Menor from Meralco, and a second round pick from Talk 'N Text. Previously, the pick was acquired by Talk 'N Text from the Barako Bull Energy Boosters before its disbandment.
- ^{f}
- ^{g}
- ^{h}
- ^{i}
- ^{j} On August 29, 2010, the Alaska Aces acquired a second draft pick in exchange for the draft rights to RJ Jazul.
- ^{k}
- ^{l} On September 4, 2010, Ginebra acquired a second round pick from the Barako Bull Energy Boosters in exchange for Sunday Salvacion.
- ^{m} On September 3, 2010, Ginebra acquired a second round pick from Air21 in exchange for Billy Mamaril.

=== Draft-day trades ===
- ^{A 1} ^{2} The Petron Blaze Boosters acquired the draft rights to 3rd pick Chris Lutz, Dondon Hontiveros and Carlo Sharma from Barako Bull in exchange for Mick Pennisi, Sunday Salvacion, future draft picks and Petron's 8th pick.
- ^{B} The Meralco Bolts acquired the draft rights to 17th pick Gilbert Bulawan from Alaska Aces in exchange for a 2014 second round draft pick.

== Undrafted players ==
Name	Position	Country of birth	College
Mark Ababon	G	Philippines	UV
Martin Antonio	F	Philippines	SBC
Alwyn Cabonce	G/F	Philippines	Letran
John Douglas Chamberlin IV	F	United States	TIP Quezon City
Christopher Concepcion	G	Philippines	Saint Francis
Marvin Graebel	F	Germany	Stauffenberg Business School
Julio Magbanua	F	Philippines	RTU
Philip Medenilla	G	United States	SUNY Oswego
Nino Nabong	G	Philippines	SIT
Ezer Kit Rosopa	C	Philippines	UE
