= Capitol Medical Center =

Private hospital in Quezon City, Philippines

- Capitol Medical Center, Inc.

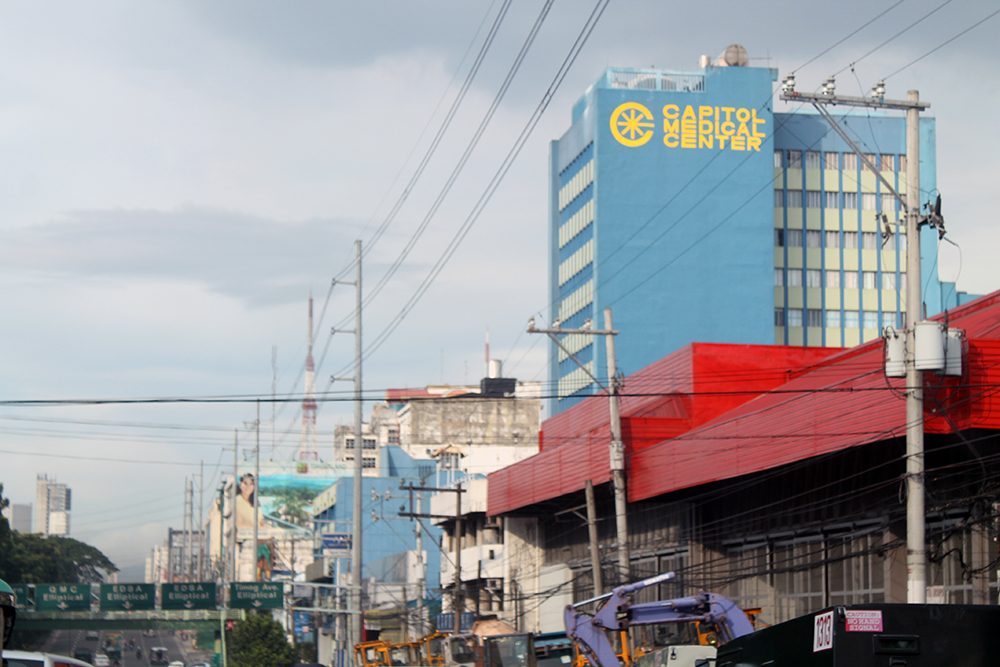

- Location within Metro Manila Location within Luzon Location within Philippines

Geography
- Location: Quezon Avenue cor. Scout Magbanua St., Barangay Paligsahan, Quezon City 1103, Metro Manila, Philippines
- Coordinates: 14°38′03.5″N 121°01′21.7″E

Services
- Emergency department: Yes
- Beds: 300 (2013)

History
- Founded: March 19, 1970; 56 years ago

Links
- Building details

General information
- Construction started: May 1, 1968
- Completed: March 19, 1970
- Opening: June 22, 1970

Website
- www.capitolmedical.com.ph

Capitol Medical Center is a tertiary hospital located in Quezon City, Philippines.

== History ==
The hospital was founded by Thelma N. Clemente, Luis C. Clemente and fellow medical professionals.

The groundbreaking of the hospital took place on May 1, 1968, and was inaugurated on March 19, 1970. It opened to the public a few months later on June 22, 1970. In 2013 it is reported that the Capitol Medical Center has 300 beds, 200 more than the initial 100 beds upon its establishment.

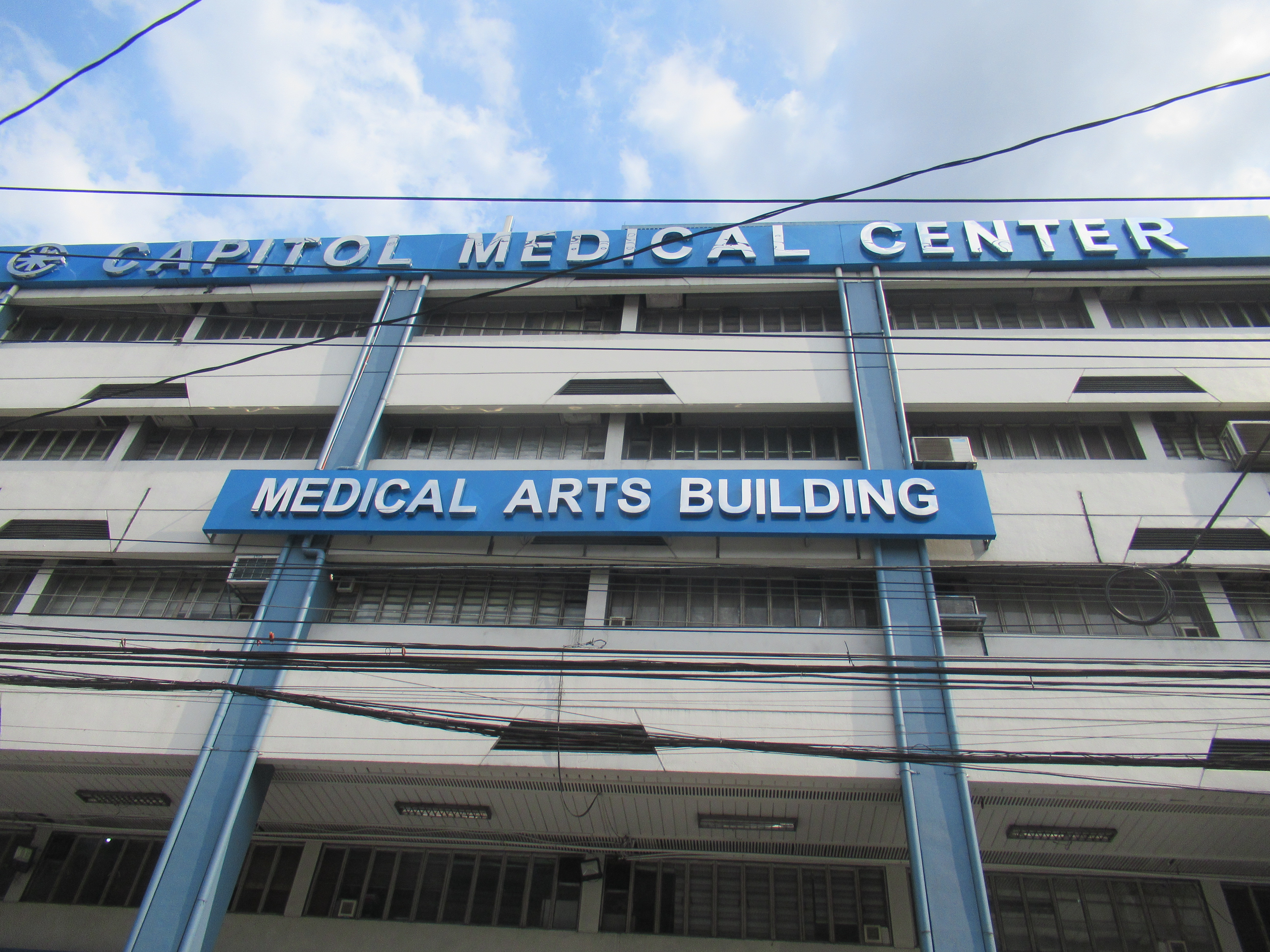
Medical Arts building

The first kidney transplant was done in the hospital in November 1970. The hospital also had national firsts such as the first private hospital to host a center for Spinal Disorder which was established in 1977, the first Digital Infrared Thermograph Imaging system acquired in 1983.

Capitol continued to expand and upgrade its facilities. The hospital established a voice and swallowing clinic catering to voice professionals and dysphagic individuals which the hospital administration describes as the first of its kind. In 2003 the first Laparoscopic Nephrectomy was performed by the hospital's surgeons.

Before founder, Thelma N. Clemente's death on November 11, 2016, a new and complete facilities for heart bypass operations were installed in the hospital.

In 2017, Capitol Medical Center, Inc. established a partnership with Mount Grace Hospitals, Inc.

In 2024, CMC became the 10th facility under PhilHealth's Z Benefit Package (“Case Type Z” or catastrophic illness) for kidney transplant, the 25th nationwide. It offers hemodialysis of 156 dialysis sessions per year and the Z Benefit Package at a reasonable cost.

== In popular culture ==
Paranormal believer claim a certain elevator of the Capitol Medical Center to be haunted. Believing clients claim this off-limits elevator brought them to the basement, which once served as a morgue, instead of bringing them to their intended destination.
