= Mark Borboran =

Filipino basketball player (born 1984)

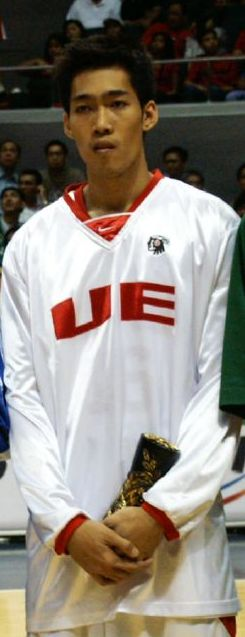
- Borboran in 2007

Free agent
- Position: Small forward / power forward

Personal information
- Born: November 20, 1984 (age 41) Malinao, Albay, Philippines
- Listed height: 6 ft 4 in (1.93 m)
- Listed weight: 185 lb (84 kg)

Career information
- High school: JRU (Mandaluyong)
- College: JRU (2003); UE (2005–2007)
- PBA draft: 2008: 1st round, 6th overall pick
- Drafted by: Air21 Express
- Playing career: 2008–present

Career history
- 2008–2011: Alaska Aces
- 2011–2013: Meralco Bolts
- 2013–2014: Air21 Express
- 2014–2016: NLEX Road Warriors
- 2016–2017: Phoenix Fuel Masters
- 2017–2025: Rain or Shine Elasto Painters

Career highlights
- PBA champion (2010 Fiesta); UAAP Mythical First Team (2007); PBL Mythical First Team (2007-08 Season)

Mark Anthony Rosales Borboran (born November 20, 1984) is a Filipino professional basketball player who last played for the Rain or Shine Elasto Painters of the Philippine Basketball Association (PBA). At 6'4", he played the small forward position.

Borboran went to college at the José Rizal University and later he moved to the UE Red Warriors. He was part of the UE Red Warriors squad that swept the elimination round, 14–0, of the 2007 UAAP season. He won a spot on the mythical team in the same year.

Borboran was drafted sixth overall in the 2008 PBA draft by the Air21 Express but was then traded to the Alaska Aces during draft night. He has also played for four different PBA franchises before staying with Rain or Shine for eight seasons.

== Amateur career ==
Coming from the JRU Light Bombers program, Borboran played one year for the JRU Heavy Bombers. In 2005, he transferred to the UE Red Warriors in the UAAP. He became a key player as a forward who could shoot and drive and was also a versatile defender and rebounder. In the preseason, he led them to the finals of the Philippine Collegiate Champions League against the FEU Tamaraws.

In his rookie season, Borboran became part of a core that included Rookie of the Year Marcy Arellano and Bonbon Custodio. After losing their first game to FEU, they then won three straight. Although their streak ended in a close loss to the Ateneo Blue Eagles, he was able to score a game-high 18 points. In a win over the UST Growling Tigers, he and Custodio both scored 20 points. They made it to the Final Four that season, where they were eliminated by FEU.

In UAAP Season 69, UE were seen as title favorites with their returning core, as well as having won the 2006 Fr. Martin Cup. However, they were eliminated by UST in the Final Four.

In the 2007 UAAP season, the Red Warriors swept the first round of eliminations with seven straight wins. He scored 16 points during the first round in a win over the Adamson Soaring Falcons, for which he won Player of the Week. During the second round, in a close win over FEU, he scored a career-high 23 points on clutch shots as he was awarded Player of the Week. In the last game of the elimination round, against the DLSU Green Archers, he was hit on the head by Rico Maierhofer. This led to both teams confronting each other and a fight started between them. Maierhofer was given an unsportsmanlike foul and UE was able to walk away with a win, completing a 14–0 sweep of the elimination round. UE made it all the way to the finals, but lost two straight to DLSU, finishing short of a UAAP title. Although Borboran did not win a title that year, he won a spot on the Mythical Team.

Borboran also played for Hapee Toothpaste in the PBL, alongside future top pick Gabe Norwood, which entered the finals twice but lost twice to Harbour Centre.

== Professional career ==
=== Alaska Aces (2008–2011) ===
Borboran was drafted sixth overall in the 2008 PBA draft by the Air21 Express but was then traded to the Alaska Aces during draft night. However, with Alaska being a winning team, he was often benched during his rookie season, especially during the 2008–09 Philippine Cup.

In his sophomore season, Borboran started getting more minutes, helping Alaska become one of the best three-point shooting teams in the league and making the 2009–10 Philippine Cup finals. Alaska then won the championship in the following conference, the 2010 Fiesta Conference. He also played in the Rookies vs Sophomores game during the 2010 All-Star Weekend.

=== Meralco Bolts (2011–2013) ===
When Borboran's contract expired in 2011, he was no longer on Alaska's roster, but the team still held his right of first refusal under a 2006 rule. The Petron Blaze Boosters and Meralco Bolts both made bids for his services, with Petron offering him an offer sheet while Meralco traded a draft pick for his rights. Meralco then matched Petron's offer sheet, securing his rights and allowing him to play for the Bolts. However, the ruling sparked criticism, with some arguing that Borboran should have been an unrestricted free agent and that retaining his rights amounted to player "warehousing".

Borboran made his debut during the 2011–12 Philippine Cup in a win over the B-Meg Llamados. He had 18 points and 11 rebounds in a win over Petron.

During the 2012–13 Philippine Cup, despite suffering an injury, Borboran was able to score 15 points in a win over the Barangay Ginebra. He then started in a win over the Alaska Aces.

=== Air21 Express (2013–2014) ===
On September 6, 2013, Borboran and Asi Taulava were traded to the Air21 Express for guard Mike Cortez and center James Sena. Borboran started the 2013–14 season as a reserve. As the 2013–14 Philippine Cup went on, he started to gain more minutes, overtaking Vic Manuel in the rotation. During the 2014 Commissioner's Cup, he had a crucial steal and two clutch steals in a win over the GlobalPort Batang Pier. In that conference, they made the semifinals against the San Mig Super Coffee Mixers. In Game 4, he contributed two out of Air21's franchise-record 15 three-pointers made to force a do-or-die game. San Mig ended their run the following game.

=== NLEX Road Warriors (2014–2016) ===
In June 2014, the franchise of Air21 was bought by the NLEX Road Warriors, a PBA D-League team. In the 2014–15 season, he averaged more than five points a game.

=== Phoenix Fuel Masters (2016–2017) ===
On May 10, 2016, Borboran and Simon Enciso were traded to the Phoenix Fuel Masters for Mac Baracael, Emman Monfort, and a 2018 draft pick. He had his first breakout game with Phoenix in a win over the Mahindra Enforcer in which he had 11 of his 13 points in the fourth quarter, including a clutch four-point play. Against his former team NLEX, he and import Eugene Phelps combined for 11 points in overtime for the win. He then led the team with 15 points and six rebounds in a win over the Blackwater Elite that secured them a slot in the 2016 Governors' Cup playoffs.

In the offseason, Borboran was given a one-year contract renewal. When Willy Wilson went down with an injury during the 2017–18 Philippine Cup, he stepped up in his place, averaging career-highs with 19.3 points on 68.76% shooting as well as 7.3 rebounds and 2.0 steals. In a win over GlobalPort, he had eight rebounds and scored 23 points, including the game-winning tip-in with 2.4 seconds remaining. In what would be his last game with Phoenix, he had 12 points on four three-pointers in a loss to Blackwater.

=== Rain or Shine Elasto Painters (2017–2025) ===
On August 7, 2017, Borboran and a 2020 second-round pick were traded to the Rain or Shine Elasto Painters for Jeff Chan. In his Rain or Shine debut, he had five points and five rebounds as they won over the Kia Picanto during the 2017 Governors' Cup. He stepped up in Rain or Shine's frontcourt with his defense and rebounding, as Gabe Norwood and Raymond Almazan were away with the Philippine national team, Jay Washington was nursing a hamstring injury, and Beau Belga dealt with a suspension. They made it to the quarterfinals, where they lost to the TNT KaTropa.

During the 2017–18 season, Borboran averaged 4.4 points and 2.8 rebounds in 32 games. During the 2019 Philippine Cup, he helped Rain or Shine seal a win over Ginebra with 12 points, eight rebounds, and a clutch free throw. He then came off the bench in the fourth quarter against the Batang Pier to spark a comeback win. Against his former team Phoenix, he made a go-ahead layup in overtime for Rain or Shine to win and get to the top of the standings. During the Commissioner's Cup, he had a season-high 21 points in a loss to the Columbian Dyip.

On April 28, 2023, Borboran signed a two-year contract extension with Rain or Shine. On August 4, 2025, after eight seasons with the team, he was let go by the team.

== PBA career statistics ==
Legend
GP	Games played	MPG	Minutes per game	FG%	Field-goal percentage
3FG%	3-point field-goal percentage	4P%	4-point field-goal percentage	FT%	Free-throw percentage
RPG	Rebounds per game	APG	Assists per game	SPG	Steals per game
BPG	Blocks per game	PPG	Points per game	127	Career high

As of the end of 2024–25 season

=== Season-by-season averages ===
Year	Team	GP	MPG	FG%	3P%	4P%	FT%	RPG	APG	SPG	BPG	PPG
2008–09	Alaska	22	6.6	.356	.348	—	.545	1.1	.4	.1	.1	2.1
2009–10	Alaska	49	14.0	.481	.362	—	.625	2.5	.7	.3	.3	4.5
2010–11	Alaska	40	15.7	.425	.292	—	.629	3.1	.4	.3	.4	4.8
2010–11	Meralco	40	15.7	.425	.292	—	.629	3.1	.4	.3	.4	4.8
2011–12	Meralco	30	19.3	.348	.226	—	.565	3.3	.4	.4	.5	3.7
2012–13	Meralco	17	14.6	.406	.375	—	.684	3.2	.4	.5	.1	4.4
2013–14	Air21	26	17.7	.360	.328	—	.571	3.3	.4	.2	.2	4.4
2014–15	NLEX	35	20.8	.412	.329	—	.688	3.3	.7	.5	.3	5.2
2015–16	NLEX	32	14.6	.371	.261	—	.923	2.2	.6	.3	.4	3.8
2015–16	Phoenix	32	14.6	.371	.261	—	.923	2.2	.6	.3	.4	3.8
2016–17	Phoenix	40	16.1	.511	.427	—	.771	3.3	.8	.7	.4	6.5
2016–17	Rain or Shine	40	16.1	.511	.427	—	.771	3.3	.8	.7	.4	6.5
2017–18	Rain or Shine	32	15.7	.424	.344	—	.650	2.8	.9	.6	.4	4.4
2019	Rain or Shine	45	13.9	.462	.289	—	.768	2.4	.6	.4	.2	5.0
2020	Rain or Shine	11	21.3	.380	.162	—	.706	3.0	1.0	.4	.2	6.6
2021	Rain or Shine	22	15.1	.429	.235	—	.750	3.1	.5	.5	.2	4.7
2022–23	Rain or Shine	30	12.8	.368	.278	—	.750	2.4	.7	.3	.3	3.3
2023–24	Rain or Shine	23	15.0	.588	.320	—	.833	2.7	1.0	.6	.4	5.3
2024–25	Rain or Shine	9	8.5	.250	.000	—	1.000	1.2	.4	.6	.1	1.1
Career		463	15.3	.428	.309	—	.703	2.7	.6	.4	.3	4.5
