= Brian Ilad =

Filipino basketball player

Personal information
- Born: June 13, 1985 (age 41)
- Listed height: 6 ft 5 in (1.96 m)
- Listed weight: 190 lb (86 kg)

Career information
- College: De La Salle
- PBA draft: 2011: 2nd round, 16th overall pick
- Drafted by: B-Meg Llamados
- Playing career: 2011–2023
- Position: Power forward / center
- Number: 1

Career history

Playing
- 2011–2012: Shopinas.com Clickers
- 2013–2014: Cebuana Lhuillier Gems
- 2014: Laskar Dreya South Sumatra
- 2018: Pasay Voyagers
- 2018–2020: Cebu City Sharks / Cebu Casino Ethyl Alcohol
- 2021: Makati FSD Blazers
- 2022–2023: Davao Occidental Tigers
- 2023: Bicol Volcanoes

Coaching
- 2021: Makati FSD Blazers (assistant)

Brian Ilad (born June 13, 1985) is a Filipino professional basketball player who last played for the Bicol Volcanoes of the Maharlika Pilipinas Basketball League (MPBL). He previously played for the Air21 Express of the Philippine Basketball Association (PBA). He was drafted 16th overall in 2011 by the B-Meg Llamados. He was traded to the Clickers for Mark Barroca.

== College career ==
Ilad played for the De La Salle Green Archers. In 2007, He was one of the members of the team which won the title against the UE Red Warriors who finished 14–0 in the elimination round gaining an outright finals berth in a sweep 2–0. On that last game where the Red Warriors were gunning for a 14–0 sweep, Ilad, who was on the bench, punched UE's Mark Fampulme on the back of the head. Ilad was then issued a disqualifying foul, and the University Athletic Association of the Philippines suspended Ilad for five games; as the Green Archers could only play five games or less, Ilad was effectively suspended for the rest of the season, including La Salle's finals rematch vs. UE.

== Professional career ==
=== PBA ===
In the 2011 PBA draft, he was drafted 16th overall by the Llamados. However, he was traded to the Clickers for Mark Barroca.

=== PBA D-League ===
Ilad played for the Cebuana Lhuillier Gems in the PBA Developmental League until 2014 when he decided to take a break from professional basketball.

=== MPBL ===
In 2018, Ilad returned to playing professional basketball. He play for the Pasay Voyagers of the Maharlika Pilipinas Basketball League starting the 2018 MPBL Datu Cup.

However, in the middle of the 2018 Datu Cup, Ilad was waived by the Voyagers, but was picked up by the Cebu City Sharks.

In February 2024, Ilad is one of the 47 players banned by the MPBL for alleged involvement in game fixing.

== Personal life ==
After leaving Cebuana Lhuillier, Ilad worked in Dubai in the United Arab Emirates for a year. While in the UAE, he participated in local basketball leagues.
