= Eric Rodriguez (basketball) =

Filipino basketball player (born 1981)

Personal information
- Born: April 15, 1981 (age 45)
- Listed height: 6 ft 4 in (1.93 m)
- Listed weight: 198 lb (90 kg)

Career information
- College: Letran
- PBA draft: 2006: Undrafted
- Playing career: 2009–2012, 2018–2020
- Position: Power forward

Career history
- 2009–2011: Air21 Express
- 2011: Meralco Bolts
- 2011: Barangay Ginebra Kings
- 2012: AirAsia Philippine Patriots
- 2018–2019: Cebu City Sharks
- 2019: Zamboanga Valientes
- 2019–2020: Iloilo United Royals

Frederick Rodriguez (born April 15, 1981) is a Filipino former professional basketball player. He played for the Philippine Patriots in ASEAN Basketball League (ABL). Rodriguez is a former player of the Letran Knights as the team captain that championed in NCAA on 2003 and 2005 and also played for Toyota Balintawak in the Philippine Basketball League for 5 years.

== Career ==
Rodriguez played in Letran for 4 years and helped them to win the championship in 2003 and 2005. He was then selected to represent the country with the RP-Harbour Centre in the SEABA Championship in Indonesia. Rodriguez also played in the Southeast Asian Games in Nakhon, Ratchasima in Thailand in December 2007.

During the 2006 PBA Draft, he went undrafted. He was then signed by the Burger King Whoppers as a free agent in 2009. After his PBA career, he played with Philippine Patriots in ASEAN Basketball League. Rodriguez was previously seen on UNTV Cup playing for House of Representatives team and was signed as practice player for GlobalPort Batang Pier in PBA.

== PBA career statistics ==
Legend
GP	Games played	MPG	Minutes per game
FG%	Field-goal percentage	3P%	3-point field-goal percentage	FT%	Free-throw percentage
RPG	Rebounds per game	APG	Assists per game	SPG	Steals per game
BPG	Blocks per game	PPG	Points per game	**Bold**	Career high

=== Season-by-season averages ===
Year	Team	GP	MPG	FG%	3P%	FT%	RPG	APG	SPG	BPG	PPG
2008–09	Air21 / Burger King	**24**	**17.6**	**.435**	**.200**	**.705**	**3.6**	**.6**	**.1**	.0	**7.0**
2009–10	Burger King	10	7.1	.381	—	.667	1.1	.0	.0	.0	1.8
2010–11	Meralco	16	7.8	.421	—	.667	1.3	.2	.0	.0	2.3
Career		50	12.3	.427	.200	.694	2.3	.4	.0	.0	4.4
