= Magi Sison =

Filipino basketball player

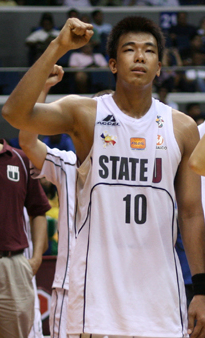
- Sison in 2010

Free agent
- Title: Center

Personal information
- Born: May 24, 1988 (age 38) Lingayen, Pangasinan, Philippines
- Listed height: 6 ft 7 in (2.01 m)
- Listed weight: 210 lb (95 kg)

Career information
- College: UP
- PBA draft: 2011: 2nd round, 11th overall pick
- Drafted by: Shopinas.com Clickers
- Playing career: 2011–2013, 2018–2020, 2024
- Position: Center

Career history
- 2011–2012: Shopinas.com Clickers / Air21 Express
- 2012–2013: Petron Blaze Boosters
- 2018–2020: Quezon City Capitals
- 2024: Mindoro Tamaraws

Magi King Sison (born May 24, 1988) is a Filipino professional basketball player who last played for the Mindoro Tamaraws of the Maharlika Pilipinas Basketball League (MPBL). He was drafted 11th overall by the Shopinas.com Clickers in the 2011 PBA draft.

== PBA career statistics ==
Legend
GP	Games played	MPG	Minutes per game
FG%	Field-goal percentage	3P%	3-point field-goal percentage	FT%	Free-throw percentage
RPG	Rebounds per game	APG	Assists per game	SPG	Steals per game
BPG	Blocks per game	PPG	Points per game	**Bold**	Career high

Correct as of October 28, 2013

=== Season ===
Year	Team	GP	MPG	FG%	3P%	FT%	RPG	APG	SPG	BPG	PPG
2011–12	Shopinas.com/Air21	**29**	**13.1**	**.400**	.000	**.500**	**3.6**	**.2**	**.2**	**.5**	**2.9**
2012–13	Petron Blaze	10	2.9	.333	.000	.333	.5	.0	.0	.0	0.5
Career		39	10.5	.396	.000	.455	2.8	.1	.1	.4	2.3
