= Shawn Weinstein =

Filipino-American basketball player

Personal information
- Born: July 30, 1985 (age 41) Rancho Palos Verdes, California, U.S.
- Listed height: 6 ft 1 in (1.85 m)
- Listed weight: 180 lb (82 kg)

Career information
- High school: Palos Verdes Peninsula (Rolling Hills Estates, California)
- College: St. Edward's (2005–2008)
- NBA draft: 2008: undrafted
- PBA draft: 2010: 1st round, 10th overall pick
- Drafted by: Alaska Aces
- Playing career: 2008–2015
- Position: Point guard

Career history
- 2008–2010: Elitzur Maccabi Netanya
- 2010–2011: Meralco Bolts
- 2012: Talk 'N Text Tropang Texters
- 2013: Barako Bull Energy
- 2015: Maccabi Hod HaSharon

Career highlights
- Israeli National League champion (2009); Israeli National League All-Defensive Team (2009); PBA champion (2011–12 Philippine); PBA Rookie-Sophomore Blitz Game Participant (2011); Heartland Player of the Year (2007); 2× First-team All-Heartland (2007, 2008)

Shawn Gabriel Sterling Weinstein (born July 30, 1985) is a Filipino-American former professional basketball player who played from 2008 to 2015 in the Israeli League and the Philippine Basketball Association (PBA). He is currently an analyst and sports commentator for Fox Sports Asia.

He played three seasons for St. Edward's University (Austin, Texas) in the NCAA Men's Division and two seasons for the Elitzur Maccabi Netanya Israel in the Ligat HaAl (Israeli Super-league).

== High school ==
Shawn Weinstein attended Palos Verdes Peninsula High School in southern California. There he had a tremendous senior season averaging 28.5 points per game and finished tied with Jordan Farmar as the number three scorer in all of southern California. He was named Co-Bay League Most Outstanding Player with Aarron Afflalo and was selected First team All Area by the Daily Breeze. Weinstein was named a first team Jewish All-American and a McDonald's All American nominee.

== College career ==
In his three years at St. Edward's University, they won three conference titles in Heartland Conference. Weinstein was the 2007 Conference Player of the Year and a two-time First Team All Conference Selection.

He was inducted into the St. Edward's Athletic Hall of Fame in 2016 and named to the Heartland Conference 20th Anniversary team in 2019, which recognizes the 10 best players from the Heartland Conference over the last 20 years.

== Professional career ==
On August 6, 2010, Weinstein was drafted 10th overall by the Meralco Bolts. He made his debut in the opening of the PBA 36th season on October 3, 2010, where he scored six points and tallied five assists.

== PBA career statistics ==
Legend
GP	Games played	MPG	Minutes per game
FG%	Field-goal percentage	3P%	3-point field-goal percentage	FT%	Free-throw percentage
RPG	Rebounds per game	APG	Assists per game	SPG	Steals per game
BPG	Blocks per game	PPG	Points per game	**Bold**	Career high

=== Season-by-season averages ===
Year	Team	GP	MPG	FG%	3P%	FT%	RPG	APG	SPG	BPG	PPG
2010–11	Meralco	**20**	10.7	.279	.242	.333	**1.6**	**1.4**	.4	**.1**	2.3
2011–12	Talk 'N Text	**20**	**11.5**	**.339**	**.281**	.444	1.4	1.3	**.5**	.0	**2.8**
2012–13	Barako Bull	13	7.5	.227	.222	**.833**	.9	.8	.2	.0	1.3
Career		53	10.2	.297	.257	.524	1.3	1.2	.4	.0	2.2
