= Meralco Bolts =

Philippine professional basketball team

- 2025–26 Meralco Bolts season
- Founded: 2010
- History: Meralco Bolts (2010–present)
- Team colors: Black, blue, orange, navy blue, steel blue, white
- Company: Manila Electric Company
- Board governor: William Pamintuan; Maria Luisa Alvendia (alternate)
- Team manager: Paolo Trillo
- Head coach: Luigi Trillo
- Team captain: Chris Newsome
- Ownership: Manuel V. Pangilinan
- Championships: 1 2024 Philippine 5 Finals appearances

The Meralco Bolts is a professional basketball team in the Philippine Basketball Association. The team began in 2010 after the Manila Electric Company (MERALCO) an MVP Group subsidiary acquired the PBA franchise of the Sta. Lucia Realtors.

== History ==
=== Background and return to pro basketball ===
The MERALCO Reddy Kilowatts was a powerhouse basketball team that played in the Manila Industrial and Commercial Athletic Association (MICAA) from 1968 to 1972. Operated by the MERALCO Athletic Club of the Manila Electric Company (MERALCO), they briefly joined the MICAA prior to World War II and was re-admitted in 1968. The team was crowned as the 1971 MICAA Open champions, beating the Crispa Redmanizers.

The demise of the YCO–Ysmael Steel rivalry following the breakup of the Ysmael Steel team in 1968, paved the way for the MERALCO–Crispa rivalry starting in 1970. The rivalry came into full-bloom during the 1971 MICAA All-Filipino championship, when Reynoso and Jaworski punched referees Eriberto "Ting" Cruz and Jose "Joe" Obias for what was the duo perceived questionable calls against MERALCO. The incident resulted to lifetime suspensions meter against the two that were lifted eventually so that the two can join the national team in the 1973 Asian Basketball Championship.

The team disbanded in 1972 in the wake of the declaration of Martial Law in the Philippines, wherein the Marcos government seized MERALCO from Eugenio López, Sr.

The Meralco Bolts logo used from 2010 to 2025.

In June 2010, there were reports that Meralco expressed interest in joining the PBA and intended to buy either Sta. Lucia's or Barako Bull's franchise after both teams unloaded most of their major players. After Barako Bull informed the board that they intended to stay with the league for the 2010–11 season, Sta. Lucia then filed a "leave of absence." On August 10, the PBA board finally approved the sale of the Sta. Lucia franchise to Meralco. The team would be named the Meralco Bolts. The team is one of three PBA teams presently under the control of businessman Manuel V. Pangilinan – the other teams being the TNT Tropang 5G and the NLEX Road Warriors.

=== 2010–2012: Early seasons ===
The Bolts debuted during the 2010–11 season with a lineup that included Mark Cardona, Asi Taulava, Nelbert Omolon, Marlou Aquino, Beau Belga, Dennis Daa, Chris Ross, Ogie Menor, Pong Escobal and Chris Pacana. Shawn Weinstein, Ford Arao, Khasim Mirza and Bam-bam Gamalinda were the first players to be drafted by the franchise. They started the Philippine Cup with a win against the crowd favorites Barangay Ginebra Kings. In the middle of the conference, they traded some of their players in exchange for Hans Thiele, Mark Isip and Reed Juntilla respectively. They compiled a 7–7 record, which was enough to take them to the quarterfinals. However, they lost to the B-Meg Derby Ace Llamados 2–0. Before the Commissioner's Cup, they made a huge trade by acquiring Solomon Mercado along with Paolo Bugia and Erick Rodriguez. They also signed 3-point shooter Renren Ritualo. Despite a revamped roster and imports Anthony Dandridge and Chamberlain Oguchi, they did not past the eliminations after having a 3–6 record. The same happened during the Governors Cup when they had a 3–5 record.

The Bolts rebuilt its line-up during the offseason, releasing Renren Ritualo, Hans Thiele, Reed Juntilla and Paolo Bugia, as well as acquiring through trades Mark Yee, Mark Macapagal, Chico Lanete, Chris Timberlake and signing free agents Mark Borboran and Bryan Faundo. During the 2011 PBA Draft, Meralco selected Gilas reserve Jason Ballesteros, as well as Gilbert Bulawan to augment their frontline. In the 2011-12 PBA Philippine Cup, they finished at 6th place at 8–6 win–loss record but swept by the Petron Blaze Boosters. In the 2012 PBA Commissioner's Cup, they finished at another sixth place at 4–5 on that 102–98 upset win over Powerade Tigers but in another miss to the semifinals for the Bolts. In the 2012 PBA Governors Cup, they finished three straight sixth places in their franchise. In the knockout game for the last semis berth, they defeated the Powerade Tigers, 94–86 to advance to their first semifinals appearance in their franchise history.

=== 2012–2015: Cliff Hodge makes his arrival ===
Ramon Segismundo announced the team's uniform for the 2012–13 season will have similar design features with the 1971 uniforms worn by the Meralco Reddy Kilowatts.

The Bolts made some offseason moves prior to the start of the season. They acquired "El Granada" Gary David from GlobalPort in exchange for Chris Ross, Chris Timberlake and Meralco's 2016 and 2017 second round picks. They have also traded the rights of Asi Taulava to Air21 in exchange for Mike Cortez, shipped Mark Cardona to Air21 via a three-team trade which in the process, acquired Rabeh Al-Hussaini. They also acquired Kerby Raymundo from Ginebra for Jay-R Reyes. Raymundo has yet to play for the Bolts since he was traded because of a nagging knee injury, and is contemplating retirement.

Midway thru the eliminations, they signed up Danny Ildefonso for the rest of the conference, who was unceremoniously let go by Petron. After realizing that Danny I still has what it takes to play, and can still help the team in terms of his leadership and positive influence, the Bolts signed him for the rest of the season.

During the PBA Philippine Cup conference, they were off to a good start, and were able to beat top-seed teams like Ginebra. However, they suffered losing streak and ended up in a four-way tie with Alaska, GlobalPort and Barako Bull. Since Barako Bull and GlobalPort have higher quotients, Meralco was forced to play a sudden death game with Alaska Aces to determine the eighth and final playoff spot. The Aces defeated them and thus they were eliminated from playoff contention.

In the 2014–15 PBA Philippine Cup conference, they performed well, even eliminating the defending champion Purefoods Star Hotshots, but were later eliminated by Alaska Aces In the 2015 Commissioner's Cup, they are in an undefeated streak due to their good performance. The team also had its import Josh Davis who helped to maintain their great streak. In the Governor's Cup, the team tapped Seiya Ando as their import, alongside Andre Emmett. Due to this, Ando became the first Japanese import in the league.

=== 2015–present: The Chris Newsome era ===
==== 2015–2019: Bolts to the finals ====
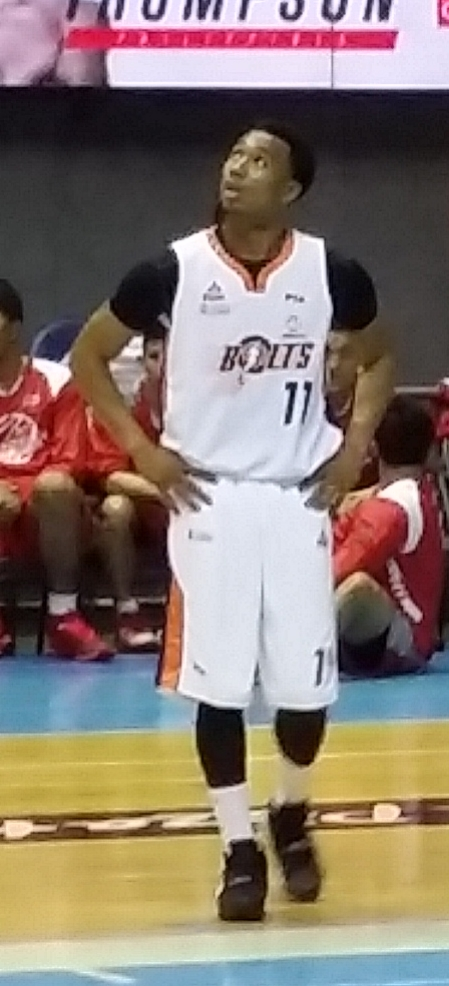
Chris Newsome was drafted by the Bolts in 2015, evolving into a key player for the franchise particularly during the mid-2020s.

The 2015–16 PBA Philippine Cup was not as good as they had before. They suffered the worst with a 1–10 record. However, the team drafted Chris Newsome and Baser Amer.

The team improved very well in the Commissioner's Cup, where they were led by ex-Maccabi Tel Aviv BC player Arinze Onuaku, who would win the Best Import of the Conference award. The team also went through some setbacks, with the suspension of Gary David in a game during an elimination round, due to insubordination. David was later removed from the line-up and becoming an unrestricted agent list.

The team also went to the Finals for the first time in their franchise history on the Governors' Cup. The Bolts were able to upset the top-seed TNT KaTropa by winning their best-of-five semifinal series in four games. They faced the crowd favorite Barangay Ginebra San Miguel in the Finals. Meralco entered the Finals as the underdogs, but managed to put up a fight and even steal Game 1. Although Ginebra won in six games, it was considered to be one of the most entertaining Finals series in recent memory. Meralco's import, Allen Durham also won the Best Import award and rookie guard/forward Chris Newsome won Rookie of the Year.

Before the season, Jimmy Alapag retired again, this time for good. The Bolts returned to the Governors' Cup Finals after a worst performance in Philippine Cup and a quarterfinals defeat in the second conference, but this time with a TNT veteran Ranidel de Ocampo. Even though they recovered on a 0–2 deficit, they still lost by seven games.

For the first time since their first finals appearance, Meralco did not passed the semifinals, as they are defeated by the Alaska Aces in a best of five saga in the 2018 PBA Governors' Cup. It will also be Jared Dillinger's final season with the team.

With the addition of Raymond Almazan and Allein Maliksi, the Bolts reached again the finals, but facing again Ginebra. They lost in the series in five games.

==== 2020–2024: Leading up to the championship ====
After the COVID-19 struck in the Philippines, the league announced to play at a bubble modeled like of the NBA. Only the Philippine Cup was played and they placed fifth in the eliminations. But when they reached semifinals, they lost to their archnemesis Barangay Ginebra.

The league now will play with two conferences, due to some lowering of regulations by the IATF. Now, Meralco without Baser Amer, after being traded to Blackwater for Mac Belo, was now led by Chris Newsome and Raymond Almazan. The Bolts reached the semifinals of the first conference facing the Magnolia Hotshots, but lost in six games. They reached the finals again in Governors' Cup, but again defeated by Ginebra in six games due to injuries occurred on Almazan.

In the middle of Philippine Cup, Norman Black filed leave for personal reasons and replaced by Luigi Trillo for last five games of the elimination round. Trillo led the team to the first playoff victory against Barangay Ginebra in Game 3. Black returned after Game 1 loss against San Miguel Beermen and led the team to tie the series, but wasn't enough to win the series and lost in seven games.

After a bad performance in Commissioner's Cup, they tapped K. J. McDaniels as their reinforcement in the Governors' Cup but they were defeated by eventual champions TNT Tropang Giga in the semifinals.

After years of service as head coach, Norman Black was now reassigned as team consultant and Luigi Trillo will replace him on the former position. In the Commissioner's Cup, parading Shonn Miller as their import, Bolts finished in the 5th place with 8–3 record tied with Ginebra and Phoenix, and the lowest of the three. Ended up with twice-to-win disadvantage, Meralco faced Phoenix Fuel Masters and forced a second game by winning the first game against Phoenix in a triple overtime and score of 116–107, thanks to a Cliff Hodge 20-point performance and Miller's 20 rebound game. But they are still eliminated in the second game 88–84, even three players scored 15 points.

Bolts did not duplicate the previous conference's win-loss record, but able to secure third-seed with winning quotient with other four teams (TNT, Rain or Shine, NLEX and Magnolia) with 6–5. In the best-of-three quarterfinals, they swept the NLEX Road Warriors. In the semifinals, the team faced their archrivals Barangay Ginebra. Game 1 and 5, Ginebra won by 4 points in both games; the Bolts eventually beat Barangay Ginebra in seven games despite being down from a 2-3 deficit. In the finals, they faced the San Miguel Beermen, who are dominated the conference and recently swept the Rain or Shine. After a Chris Newsome clutch basket in Game 6 and a June Mar Fajardo missed three-point shot, they won the finals series in 4–2, and grabbed their first championship in franchise history.

==== 2024–present: Post-championship ====
The team drafted CJ Cansino of UP Fighting Maroons, and tapped the services of Allen Durham as the team's import for the conference.

The team switched their main uniform color from navy blue to black, but retained orange and added other shade of blue. Fans said that jersey rebrand was inspired by the Oklahoma City Thunder.

== Mascot ==
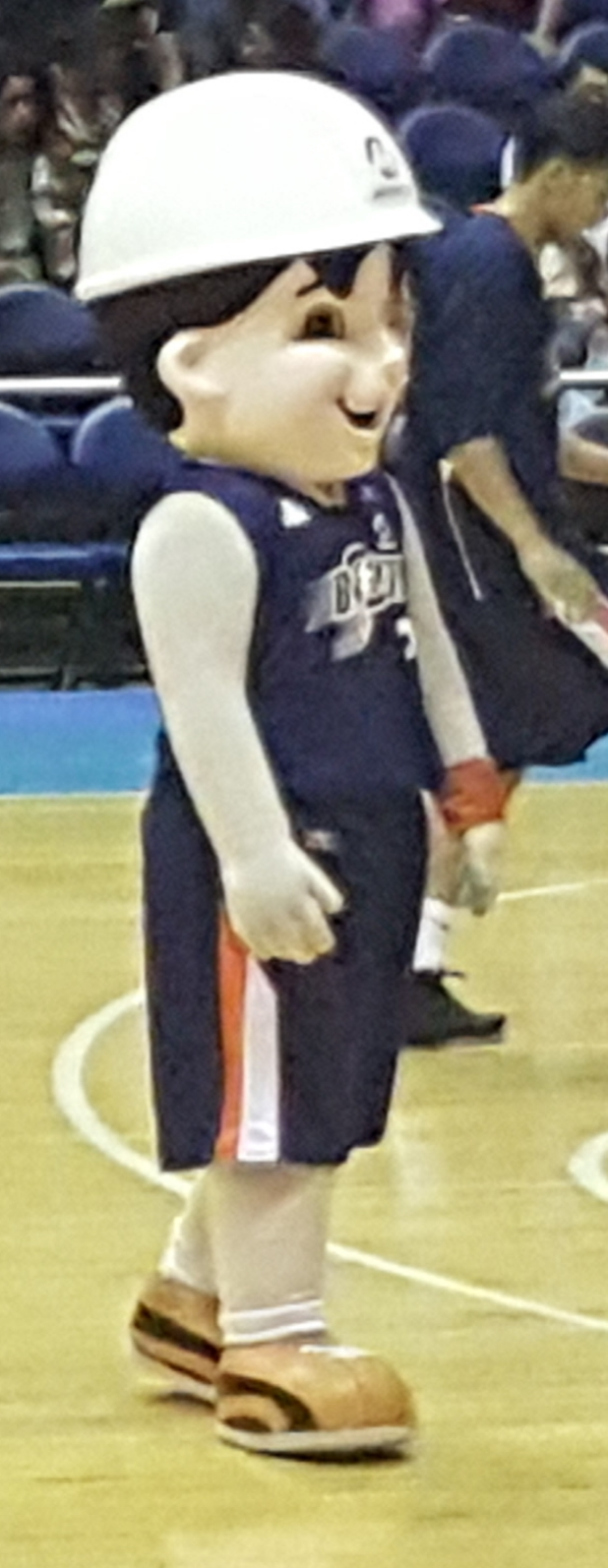
Biboy Liwanag during Meralco's semifinal game versus Alaska on April 25, 2016

"Biboy Liwanag" is the main mascot of the Bolts; he was first introduced as the team's mascot during their maiden season in 2010.

== Current roster ==
Meralco Bolts roster
Players
Coaches

Pos.	#	POB	Name	Height	Weight	DOB (YYYY–MM–DD)	From
G	1	(Philippines)	Aaron Black	6 ft 1 in (1.85 m)	180 lb (82 kg)	1996–12–03	Ateneo
G	5	(United States)	Jason Brickman	5 ft 10 in (1.78 m)	165 lb (75 kg)	1991–11–19	LIU Brooklyn
G	6	(United States)	Chris Banchero	6 ft 1 in (1.85 m)	175 lb (79 kg)	1989–01–24	Seattle Pacific
F	7	(United States)	Cliff Hodge	6 ft 4 in (1.93 m)	195 lb (88 kg)	1988–02–03	Hawaii Pacific
F	10	(Philippines)	Javee Mocon	6 ft 4 in (1.93 m)	189 lb (86 kg)	1995–04–07	San Beda
G/F	11	(United States)	Chris Newsome	6 ft 2 in (1.88 m)	190 lb (86 kg)	1990–07–25	Ateneo
G	17	(Philippines)	Anjo Caram	5 ft 7 in (1.70 m)	159 lb (72 kg)	1991–01–14	San Beda
F	19	(Philippines)	Bong Quinto	6 ft 2 in (1.88 m)		1994–12–15	Letran
C	20	(Philippines)	Raymond Almazan	6 ft 8 in (2.03 m)	194 lb (88 kg)	1989–08–02	Letran
F	22	(Philippines)	Allein Maliksi	6 ft 4 in (1.93 m)	180 lb (82 kg)	1987–09–18	UST
F	24	(Philippines)	Raymar Jose	6 ft 4 in (1.93 m)	210 lb (95 kg)	1992–08–06	Far Eastern
F	27	(Philippines)	Jansen Rios	6 ft 3 in (1.91 m)	185 lb (84 kg)	1991–10–28	Adamson
G	29	(Philippines)	Jeff Comia	5 ft 11 in (1.80 m)		1997–08–29	New Era
F/C	32	(United States)	Kyle Pascual	6 ft 6 in (1.98 m)	210 lb (95 kg)	1990–04–13	San Beda
C	33	(Australia)	Brandon Bates	6 ft 9 in (2.06 m)	231 lb (105 kg)	1996–08–12	De La Salle
G	71	(Philippines)	CJ Cansino	6 ft 2 in (1.88 m)		1999–10–27	UP
F/C	93	(Italy)	Vince Magbuhos	6 ft 5 in (1.96 m)		1999–10–07	Adamson

Head coach

- (Philippines) Luigi Trillo

Assistant coach(es)

- (Philippines) Gene Afable (1st assistant)
- (Philippines) Reynel Hugnatan
- (Philippines) Sandro Soriano
- (Serbia) Nenad Vučinić (active consultant)
- (United States) Norman Black (consultant)

Team manager

- (Philippines) Paolo Trillo

Legend

- (C) Team captain
- (CI) Commissioner's Cup Import
- (GI) Governors' Cup Import
- (EI) EASL Import
- (DP) Unsigned draft pick
- (FA) Free agent
- (IN) Inactive
- (S) Suspended
- (R) Rookie
- Injured

Roster

== Head coaches ==
Name	Start	End	Seasons	Overall record				Best finish
Name	Start	End	Seasons	G	W	L	PCT	Best finish
Ryan Gregorio	2010	2014	4	160	71	89	.444	Semifinals
Norman Black	2014	2023	9	326	170	156	.522	Finals
Luigi Trillo	2023	Incumbent						Champions

== Season-by-season records ==
List of the last five conferences completed by the Meralco Bolts. For the full-season history, see List of Meralco Bolts seasons.

Note: GP = Games played, W = Wins, L = Losses, W–L% = Winning percentage

Season	Conference	GP	W	L	W–L%	Finish	Playoffs
2024–25	Commissioner's	12	7	5	.583	5th	Lost in quarterfinals vs. Barangay Ginebra, 1–2
2024–25	Philippine	11	6	5	.545	8th	Lost in quarterfinals vs. San Miguel**, 97–107
2025–26	Philippine	11	6	5	.545	7th	Lost in semifinals vs. TNT, 1–4
2025–26	Commissioner's	12	8	4	.667	4th	Lost in semifinals vs. TNT, 2–4
2025–26	Governors' Cup	10	4	6	.400	5th (Group B)	Did not qualify
An asterisk (*) indicates one-game playoff; two asterisks (**) indicate team with twice-to-beat advantage

== Players of note ==
=== Other notable players ===
- Jimmy Alapag
- Don Allado
- Baser Amer
- Sean Anthony
- Marlou Aquino
- Paul Artadi
- Simon Atkins
- Nonoy Baclao
- Mac Baracael
- Beau Belga
- Mark Borboran
- Ronjay Buenafe
- Paolo Bugia
- Gilbert Bulawan
- KG Canaleta
- Mark Cardona
- Justin Chua
- Mike Cortez
- Ed Daquioag
- Gary David
- Ranidel de Ocampo
- Jared Dillinger
- Pong Escobal
- Gabby Espinas
- Bryan Faundo
- John Ferriols
- Riego Gamalinda
- Jonathan Grey
- Rey Guevarra
- Rabeh Al-Hussaini
- Reynel Hugnatan
- Danny Ildefonso
- Mark Isip
- Chico Lanete
- Garvo Lanete
- Mark Macapagal
- Vic Manuel
- Ogie Menor
- Solomon Mercado
- Kelly Nabong
- Nelbert Omolon
- John Pinto
- Jai Reyes
- Jay-R Reyes
- Ren-Ren Ritualo
- Chris Ross
- Sunday Salvacion
- James Sena
- Asi Taulava
- Mike Tolomia
- Jonathan Uyloan
- John Wilson
- Mark Yee
- Joseph Yeo

=== Imports ===
- Seiya Ando (2015 Governors')
- Earl Barron (2012 Commissioner's)
- Tony Bishop (2021 Governors')
- Suleiman Braimoh (2023-24 Commissioner's)
- Brian Butch (2014 Commissioner's)
- Anthony Dandridge (2011 Commissioner's)
- Josh Davis (2015 Commissioner's)
- Eric Dawson (2013 Commissioner's)
- Allen Durham (2016 Governors', 2017 Governors', 2018 Governors', 2019 Governors')
- Andre Emmett (2015 Governors')
- Jarrid Famous (2012 Commissioner's)
- Darnell Jackson (2014 Commissioner's)
- Mohammad Jamshidi (2016 Governors')
- Zach Lofton (2023-24 Commissioner's)
- K.J. McDaniels (2022-23 Commissioner's, 2023 Governors')
- Shonn Miller (2023-24 Governors')
- Johnny O'Bryant III (2022-23 Commissioner's)
- Chamberlain Oguchi (2011 Commissioner's, 2011 Governors', 2012 Governors')
- Arinze Onuaku (2011 Commissioner's, 2018 Commissioner's)
- Tim Pickett (2011 Governors')
- Alex Stepheson (2017 Commissioner's)
- Mario West (2012 Governors', 2013 Governors', 2014 Governors')
- Terrence Williams (2014 Commissioner's)

== Awards ==
=== Individual awards ===
Finals MVP	PBA Rookie of the Year Award	PBA All-Defensive Team
Chris Newsome (2024 Philippine)	Chris Newsome (2015–16); Aaron Black (2020)	Cliff Hodge (2021, 2022–23, 2023–24); Chris Newsome (2022—23, 2023–24)
PBA Mythical First Team	PBA Mythical Second Team	PBA Best Import
Chris Newsome (2023–24)	Cliff Hodge (2016–17, 2023–24)	Arinze Onuaku (2016 Commissioner's); Allen Durham (2016 Governors', 2017 Governors', 2019 Governors')

=== PBA Press Corps Individual Awards ===
Mr. Quality Minutes	All-Rookie Team
Allein Maliksi (2021); Bong Quinto (2023–24)	Cliff Hodge (2012–13); Chris Newsome (2015–16); Aaron Black (2020)
Defensive Player of the Year	Baby Dalupan Coaches of the Year
Cliff Hodge (2023-24)	2023-24: Gene Afable; Norman Black; Reynel Hugnatan; Sandro Soriano; Luigi Trillo; Nenad Vučinić

=== All-Star Weekend ===
All Star MVP	Three-point Shootout
Gary David (2014); Baser Amer (2018 Mindanao Leg)	Mark Macapagal (2012); Raymond Almazan (2024)
Slam Dunk Contest	All Star Selection
Rey Guevarra (2014, 2015, 2016); Chris Newsome (2017)	2011: Mark Cardona; Asi Taulava; 2012: Sol Mercado; Chris Ross; Asi Taulava; 2014: Gary David; Jared Dillinger; 2015: Reynel Hugnatan; 2017: Baser Amer; Ed Daquioag; Jonathan Grey; 2018: Baser Amer; 2019: Baser Amer; 2023: Raymond Almazan; Chris Newsome; 2024: Cliff Hodge; Chris Newsome; 2026: CJ Cansino; Chris Newsome

== See also ==
- Meralco Bolts draft history
- Meralco Reddy Kilowatts
- F.C. Meralco Manila
- Meralco Power Spikers
