= Air21 Express (2012–2014) =

- Founded: 2011
- Dissolved: 2014
- History: Shopinas.com Clickers (2011–2012); Air21 Express (2012–2014)
- Team colors: Purple, Orange, White
- Company: Airfrieght 2100, Inc.
- Head coach: Franz Pumaren
- Ownership: Alberto Lina
- Retired numbers: 1 (18)
Light uniform	Dark uniform

The Air21 Express was a professional basketball team in the Philippine Basketball Association (PBA) that debuted in the 2011–12 season. The team debuted as the Shopinas.com Clickers during the 2011–12 PBA Philippine Cup. In 2014, the franchise was sold to Manila North Tollways Corporation, a subsidiary of Metro Pacific Investments Corporation, and was subsequently renamed the NLEX Road Warriors.

== History ==
Energy Food and Drink Inc., owner of the original Barako Bull Energy Boosters franchise, informed the PBA board in March 2011 of its intention to cease operations, citing a planned shift in business strategy amid ongoing legal disputes and the death of board governor Tony Chua during Tropical Storm Ondoy (Ketsana).

Barako Bull had been on leave since the 2011 PBA Commissioner's Cup and was planning to sell the franchise to Phoenix Petroleum Philippines, Inc., the sponsor of the league's games outside Metro Manila. On the PBA board meeting, the board disallowed the sale of the franchise to Phoenix, failing to get at least two-thirds of the ten board members, although they allowed Barako Bull to stay on leave until the 2011 PBA Governors Cup.

In June 2011, Barako Bull informed the PBA it intended to sell its franchise to the Lina Group of Companies (LGC), owner of the Air21 Express franchise, reportedly for 50 million pesos. In July 2011, the board approved Barako Bull's sale to Airfreight 2100, while deferring the new franchise's concession that might be given to the team to improve its roster. Air21's Manny Alvarez mentioned that the second Lina Group franchise will be named "Shopinas.com", named after its new company that focuses into e-commerce, and that the new team's representative would be Shiela Lina, who is then forming the team's coaching staff.

=== Shopinas.com Clickers ===
Shopinas.com Clickers
- Colors

Uniforms
Light uniform	Dark uniform

Former De La Salle Green Archers coach Franz Pumaren was named as head coach. Pumaren, who has coached the La Salle men's varsity basketball team to five University Athletic Association of the Philippines (UAAP) basketball titles, resigned as La Salle coach in 2009 to concentrate on his political career. As a result of the old Barako Bull franchise trading away their best players, the franchise asked PBA commissioner Chito Salud for concessions in the 2011 PBA Draft, pending approval from the PBA board. The board eventually approved to give the team the first pick for the second round (11th overall).

The Clickers selected Mark Barroca, Magi Sison and Mark Cagoco in the 2011 PBA Draft. Barroca was eventually sent to the B-Meg Llamados for Brian Ilad and Elmer Espiritu in a three-way trade with Barako Bull Energy.

The team finished the Philippine Cup eliminations with a 0–14 record, setting a new all-time record for consecutive losses in a single conference, which was previously held by the 1982 Great Taste Discoverers (Reinforced Filipino Conference) and the 1984 Country Fair Hotdogs (2nd All-Filipino Conference).

=== Air21 Express ===
After a disappointing finish in the Philippine Cup, the Lina Group decided to rename the franchise as the Air21 Express, the name that was previously carried by their sister team, Barako Bull Energy.

Before the Commissioner's Cup started, the team traded Mark Canlas, Dennis Daa, and a 2012 first round pick to the Meralco Bolts in exchange for bigmen Nelbert Omolon and Mark Isip.

The team had signed SMART-Gilas player Marcus Douthit as their import for the Commissioner's Cup. Despite having Douthit as import, the team failed to pass through the elimination round, only finishing with a 3–6 record.

After years of failed campaigns, Air 21 led by 42-year-old Asi Taulava qualified for the 2014 PBA Commissioner's Cup quarterfinals and defeated the second-seeded San Miguel Beermen twice in a row to enter the PBA semifinals for the first time in franchise history. However, they were beaten by the eventual champions San Mig Super Coffee Mixers in their semifinals series that extended to a Game 5.

=== Sale of the franchise to NLEX ===
In March 2014, the Manila North Tollways Corporation (NLEX Road Warriors), together with Ever Bilena Cosmetics, Inc. (Blackwater Sports) and Columbian Autocar Corporation (Kia Sorento), applied for an expansion franchise in the PBA. Their respective applications were approved by the PBA board of governors on March 7, 2014. While Kia and Blackwater have paid the franchise fee set by the league, MNTC requested for an extension, as they were studying whether to enter the PBA as an expansion team or acquire an existing PBA franchise. This is due to the limited concessions given by the league to the expansion teams, namely the "protect 12" policy for the expansion draft, no direct hires or carry-over players from their PBA D-League teams, and the 11th to 16th pick in the upcoming rookie draft.

On June 17, 2014, MNTC announced that it was having negotiations with a PBA team to acquire their franchise. Due to the ongoing Governors' Cup playoffs, MNTC did not identify the team they were negotiating with, but stated it will reveal the team's identity once the team was eliminated. Days later, the team was revealed to be Air21 Express.

On June 23, 2014, an agreement was reached between MNTC and the Lina Group of Companies regarding the sale of the Air21 Express PBA franchise to MNTC. The sale was approved during the regular monthly meeting of the board of governors, paving the way for the sale of the franchise to MNTC.

== Final roster ==
Air21 Express roster
Players
Coaches

Pos.	#	POB	Name	Height	Weight	DOB (YYYY–MM–DD)	From
SG	3	(Philippines)	Mark Cardona	6 ft 2 in (1.88 m)	180 lb (82 kg)	1981-11-03	De La Salle
PG	6	(Philippines)	Eloy Poligrates (R)	6 ft 0 in (1.83 m)	180 lb (82 kg)	1986-29-04	Southwestern-U
G	7	(Philippines)	Atkins, Simon	6 ft 0 in (1.83 m)	180 lb (82 kg)	1988-07-19	De La Salle
SG	8	(Philippines)	Joseph Yeo	6 ft 2 in (1.88 m)	190 lb (86 kg)	1983-09-07	De La Salle
SF	10	(Canada)	Sean Anthony (injured)	6 ft 4 in (1.93 m)	200 lb (91 kg)	1986-01-26	McGill
PG	11	(Philippines)	Jonas Villanueva	5 ft 11 in (1.80 m)	175 lb (79 kg)	1983-03-31	Far Eastern
F	13	(Philippines)	Eric Camson (R)	6 ft 3 in (1.91 m)	228 lb (103 kg)	1990-06-12	Adamson
F/C	14	(Philippines)	Enrico Villanueva	6 ft 5 in (1.96 m)	230 lb (104 kg)		Ateneo
G/F	15	(Philippines)	Menor, Ogie	6 ft 5 in (1.96 m)	190 lb (86 kg)	1986-12-04	San Beda
F	16	(Philippines)	Mark Borboran	6 ft 4 in (1.93 m)	170 lb (77 kg)	1981-11-01	UE
F/C	17	(Philippines)	Aldrech Ramos	6 ft 7 in (2.01 m)	215 lb (98 kg)	1988-04-03	Far Eastern
G/F	21	(Philippines)	Jaime, Chito	6 ft 4 in (1.93 m)	200 lb (91 kg)	1983-10-21	AMA
PF	63	(Switzerland)	Michael Burtscher	6 ft 6 in (1.98 m)	210 lb (95 kg)	1985-03-08	Clearwater Christian
C	88	(Tonga)	Asi Taulava	6 ft 9 in (2.06 m)	245 lb (111 kg)	1973-03-02	BYU–Hawaii

Head coach

- (Philippines) Franz Pumaren (De La Salle)

Assistant coach(es)

- (Philippines) Jack Santiago (Mapúa)
- (Philippines) Tonichi Yturri (De La Salle)
- (Philippines) Pocholo Villanueva (De La Salle)
- (Philippines) Daniel Rose
- (Philippines) Joshua Villapando
- (Philippines) Johnny Tam

Legend

- (C) Team captain
- (CI) Commissioner's Cup Import
- (GI) Governors' Cup Import
- (EI) EASL Import
- (DP) Unsigned draft pick
- (FA) Free agent
- (IN) Inactive
- (S) Suspended
- (R) Rookie
- Injured

Roster

== Season-by-season records ==
Records from the 2013–14 PBA season:

Conf.	Team name	Elimination round				Playoffs	
Conf.	Team name	Finish	W	L	PCT	Stage	Results
PHI	Air21 Express	10th/10	3	11	.214	Did not qualify	
COM	Air21 Express	7th/10	3	6	.333	Quarterfinals; Semifinals	Air21 def. San Miguel** in two games San Mig Super Coffee 3, Air21 2
GOV	Air21 Express	7th/10	5	4	.556	Quarterfinals	Rain or Shine** 111, Air21 90
Total elimination round			11	21	.344	1 semifinal appearance	
Total playoffs			4	4	.500	0 Finals appearances	
Total 2013–14			15	25	.375	0 championships	
Total franchise			34	77	.306	0 championships	

*one-game playoffs
**team had the twice-to-beat advantage

=== Retired numbers ===
Air21 Express retired numbers
N°	Player	Position	Tenure
18	Vergel Meneses	G	2002-2004^{[a]}

- ^{a} – retired on December 18, 2013. Meneses wore #18 during his stint for the Swift/Sunkist/Pop Cola franchise from 1993 to 1999. He played for the old FedEx/Air21 franchise (known as the Barako Bull Energy until 2016) from 2002 to 2004, wearing jersey #8.

== Awards ==
=== Individual awards ===
PBA Mythical First Team	PBA Most Improved Player
Asi Taulava (2013-14)	KG Canaleta (2012-13)

=== PBA Press Corps Individual Awards ===
Bogs Adornado Comeback Player of the Year	All-Rookie Team
Asi Taulava (2013-14)	James Sena (2011-12)

=== All-Star Weekend ===
All-Star Selection
- KG Canaleta (2013)

== See also ==
- Shopinas.com Lady Clickers (PSL women's volleyball team)

Preceded by Barako Bull Energy Boosters	PBA teams genealogies 2011–2014	Succeeded by NLEX Road Warriors
