= 2012–13 Petron Blaze Boosters season =

- Head coach: Olsen Racela; Gee Abanilla (Governors' Cup)
- General manager: Hector Calma; Siot Tanquingcen (Governors' Cup)
- Owners: Petron Corporation (a San Miguel Corporation subsidiary)

Philippine Cup results
- Record: 6–8 (42.9%)
- Place: 7th
- Playoff finish: Quarterfinalist (eliminated by San Mig Coffee in one game)

Commissioner's Cup results
- Record: 8–6 (57.1%)
- Place: 3rd
- Playoff finish: Quarterfinalist (def. by Talk N' Text 0–2)

Governors' Cup results
- Record: 8–1 (88.9%)
- Place: 2nd
- Playoff finish: Runner-up (def. by San Mig Coffee 3–4)

Petron Blaze Boosters seasons

The 2012–13 Petron Blaze Boosters season was the 38th season of the franchise in the Philippine Basketball Association (PBA). The team placed seventh in the Philippine Cup, third in the Commissioner's Cup and second in the Governors' Cup. It had three draft picks: two Filipino and one American.

== Key dates ==
- August 19: The 2012 PBA Draft was held in Robinson's Midtown Mall, Manila.
- August 22: Ato Agustin was replaced as head coach by assistant coach Olsen Racela. Team consultant Rajko Toroman was made assistant coach, with a more active role anticipated.
- October 24: Petron management gave full control of the team to Olsen Racela, with Toroman no longer active. Racela appointed Gee Abanilla as lead assistant coach.
- June 26: Gee Abanilla was promoted to head coach while Hector Calma will be replaced by Siot Tanquingcen.

== Draft picks ==
| Round | Pick | Player | Position | Nationality | College |
|---|---|---|---|---|---|
| 1 | 1 | June Mar Fajardo | C | Philippines | Cebu |
| 1 | 3 | Alex Mallari | G/F | United States | Lewis-Clark State |
| 3 | 5 | Mark Sarangay | F/C | Philippines | Mapúa |

== Roster ==
2012–13 Petron Blaze Boosters roster
Players
Coaches

| Pos. | # | POB | Name | Height | Weight | DOB (YYYY–MM–DD) | From |
|---|---|---|---|---|---|---|---|
| PG | 2 | (Philippines) | Dennis Miranda | 6 ft 0 in (1.83 m) | 185 lb (84 kg) | | Far Eastern |
| SF | 3 | (United States) | Chris Lutz | 6 ft 3 in (1.91 m) | 200 lb (91 kg) | | Marshall |
| PG | 5 | (Philippines) | Alex Cabagnot (C) | 5 ft 10 in (1.78 m) | 175 lb (79 kg) | | Hawaiʻi–Hilo |
| SF | 7 | (United States) | Jason Deutchman (R) | 6 ft 6 in (1.98 m) | 212 lb (96 kg) | | San Diego State |
| PF | 10 | (Philippines) | Danny Ildefonso | 6 ft 6 in (1.98 m) | 215 lb (98 kg) | | National-U |
| PF | 12 | (Philippines) | Mark Isip | 6 ft 5 in (1.96 m) | 220 lb (100 kg) | | Far Eastern |
| SF | 13 | (United States) | Marcio Lassiter | 6 ft 2 in (1.88 m) | 185 lb (84 kg) | | Cal State Fullerton |
| G | 21 | (Philippines) | Paolo Hubalde | 5 ft 11 in (1.80 m) | 170 lb (77 kg) | | UE |
| C | 22 | (Philippines) | June Mar Fajardo (R) | 6 ft 11 in (2.11 m) | 250 lb (113 kg) | | Cebu |
| F/C | 24 | (Philippines) | Magi Sison | 6 ft 7 in (2.01 m) | 210 lb (95 kg) | | UP Diliman |
| PG | 26 | (Philippines) | Chico Lanete | 6 ft 0 in (1.83 m) | 180 lb (82 kg) | | Lyceum |
| SF | 29 | (Philippines) | Arwind Santos | 6 ft 4 in (1.93 m) | 170 lb (77 kg) | | Far Eastern |
| F/C | 44 | (Philippines) | Doug Kramer | 6 ft 5 in (1.96 m) | 210 lb (95 kg) | | Ateneo |
| SG | 71 | (Philippines) | Ronald Tubid | 6 ft 1 in (1.85 m) | 185 lb (84 kg) | | UE |

Head coach

- (Philippines) Gee Abanilla (De La Salle)

Assistant coach(es)

- (Philippines) Leo Austria (Lyceum)
- (Philippines) Koy Banal (Mapúa)
- (Philippines) Biboy Ravanes (Cebu)
- (United States) John Todd Purves

Team manager

- (Philippines) Siot Tanquingcen (UST)

Legend

- (C) Team captain
- (CI) Commissioner's Cup Import
- (GI) Governors' Cup Import
- (EI) EASL Import
- (DP) Unsigned draft pick
- (FA) Free agent
- (IN) Inactive
- (S) Suspended
- (R) Rookie
- Injured

Roster

== Philippine Cup ==
=== Eliminations ===
==== Standings ====
| Pos | Team | W | L | PCT | GB | Qualification |
|---|---|---|---|---|---|---|
| 1 | Talk 'N Text Tropang Texters | 12 | 2 | .857 | — | Twice-to-beat in the quarterfinals |
| 2 | San Mig Coffee Mixers | 10 | 4 | .714 | 2 | Twice-to-beat in the quarterfinals |
| 3 | Rain or Shine Elasto Painters | 9 | 5 | .643 | 3 | Best-of-three quarterfinals |
| 4 | Meralco Bolts | 8 | 6 | .571 (Note: Head-to-head record: Alaska 1–1 Meralco (Meralco +4)) | 4 | Best-of-three quarterfinals |
| 5 | Alaska Aces | 8 | 6 | .571 | 4 | Best-of-three quarterfinals |
| 6 | Barangay Ginebra San Miguel | 7 | 7 | .500 | 5 | Best-of-three quarterfinals |
| 7 | Petron Blaze Boosters | 6 | 8 | .429 | 6 | Twice-to-win in the quarterfinals |
| 8 | Air21 Express | 5 | 9 | .357 | 7 | Twice-to-win in the quarterfinals |
| 9 | Barako Bull Energy Cola | 4 | 10 | .286 | 8 | |
| 10 | GlobalPort Batang Pier | 1 | 13 | .071 | 11 | |

Source: PBA.ph

==== Game log ====
2013 PBA Philippine Cup game log
October

| Game | Date | Opponent | Score | High points | High rebounds | High assists | Location Attendance | Record | |
|---|---|---|---|---|---|---|---|---|---|
| 1 | October 3 | Rain or Shine | 86–102 | Yeo, Santos (16) | Fajardo (12) | Lutz (5) | Smart Araneta Coliseum | 0–1 | Boxscore |
| 2 | October 10 | Barako Bull | 98–89 | Lutz (22) | Santos (11) | Cabagnot (10) | Smart Araneta Coliseum | 1–1 | Boxscore |
| 3 | October 14 | San Mig Coffee | 84–90 | Santos (18) | Fajardo (13) | Lutz (6) | Smart Araneta Coliseum | 1–2 | Boxscore |
| 4 | October 19 | Alaska | 86–88 | Lutz (20) | Washington (13) | Lutz, Cabagnot (6) | Smart Araneta Coliseum | 1–3 | Boxscore |
| 5 | October 21 | Barangay Ginebra | 98–95 | Cabagnot (25) | Santos (17) | Cabagnot (8) | Mall of Asia Arena | 2–3 | Boxscore |
| 6 | October 26 | GlobalPort | 110–98 | Santos (29) | Santos (17) | Cabagnot (9) | Smart Araneta Coliseum | 3–3 | Boxscore |

November

| Game | Date | Opponent | Score | High points | High rebounds | High assists | Location Attendance | Record | |
|---|---|---|---|---|---|---|---|---|---|
| 7 | November 2 | Air21 | 76–97 | Santos (15) | Santos (14) | Lutz (7) | Smart Araneta Coliseum | 3–4 | Boxscore |
| 8 | November 7 | Talk 'N Text | 82–92 | Lutz (18) | Santos (11) | Santos (6) | Smart Araneta Coliseum | 3–5 | Boxscore |
| 9 | November 11 | Meralco | 81–95 | Cabagnot (19) | Santos (16) | Cabagnot, Lutz (4) | Mall of Asia Arena | 3–6 | Boxscore |
| 10 | November 14 | Rain or Shine | 96–86 | Lutz (19) | Santos (15) | Cabagnot (7) | Smart Araneta Coliseum | 4–6 | Boxscore |
| 11 | November 18 | GlobalPort | 110–81 | Lutz (22) | Santos (13) | Miranda (10) | Smart Araneta Coliseum | 5–6 | Boxscore |
| 12 | November 24 | Barako Bull | 93–83 | Santos (21) | Santos (12) | Cabagnot, Lutz (5) | Lucena City | 6–6 | Boxscore |
| 13 | November 28 | Talk 'N Text | 82–95 | Santos (22) | Santos (11) | Cabagnot, Miranda (4) | Smart Araneta Coliseum | 6–7 | Boxscore |

December

| Game | Date | Opponent | Score | High points | High rebounds | High assists | Location Attendance | Record | |
|---|---|---|---|---|---|---|---|---|---|
| 14 | December 5 | Alaska | 71–79 | Lassiter (14) | Santos (11) | Yeo, Miranda, Lutz (3) | Smart Araneta Coliseum | 6–8 | Boxscore |

2012–13 schedule

=== Playoffs ===
==== Bracket ====
Quarterfinals
(#1 twice-to-beat)
1 | Talk 'N Text | 105
8 | Air21 | 100
(Best-of-3)
4 | Meralco | 0
5 | Alaska | 2
(#2 twice-to-beat)
2 | San Mig Coffee | 92*
7 | Petron Blaze | 87
(Best-of-3)
3 | Rain or Shine | 2
6 | Barangay Ginebra | 1

Semifinals (Best-of-7)
1 | Talk 'N Text | 4
5 | Alaska | 2
2 | San Mig Coffee | 2
3 | Rain or Shine | 4

Finals (Best-of-7)
1 | Talk 'N Text | 4
3 | Rain or Shine | 0

*Game went into overtime

==== Game log ====
2013 PBA Philippine Cup playoffs game log
Quarterfinals: 0–1

| Game | Date | Opponent | Score | High points | High rebounds | High assists | Location Attendance | Series | |
|---|---|---|---|---|---|---|---|---|---|
| 1 | December 13 | San Mig Coffee | 87–92* | Fajardo (22) | Fajardo (15) | Cabagnot (10) | Smart Araneta Coliseum | 0–1 | Boxscore |

2012–13 schedule

== Commissioner's Cup ==
=== Eliminations ===
==== Standings ====
| Pos | Team | W | L | PCT | GB | Qualification |
|---|---|---|---|---|---|---|
| 1 | Alaska Aces | 11 | 3 | .786 | — | Twice-to-beat in the quarterfinals |
| 2 | Rain or Shine Elasto Painters | 9 | 5 | .643 | 2 | Twice-to-beat in the quarterfinals |
| 3 | Petron Blaze Boosters | 8 | 6 | .571 (Note: Head-to-head record: Petron 2–0 San Mig) | 3 | Best-of-three quarterfinals |
| 4 | San Mig Coffee Mixers | 8 | 6 | .571 | 3 | Best-of-three quarterfinals |
| 5 | Meralco Bolts | 7 | 7 | .500 (Note: Head-to-head quotient: Meralco 1.01, TNT 1.00, Barangay Ginebra 0.99) | 4 | Best-of-three quarterfinals |
| 6 | Talk 'N Text Tropang Texters | 7 | 7 | .500 | 4 | Best-of-three quarterfinals |
| 7 | Barangay Ginebra San Miguel | 7 | 7 | .500 | 4 | Twice-to-win in the quarterfinals |
| 8 | Air21 Express | 6 | 8 | .429 | 5 | Twice-to-win in the quarterfinals |
| 9 | Barako Bull Energy Cola | 5 | 9 | .357 | 6 | |
| 10 | GlobalPort Batang Pier | 2 | 12 | .143 | 9 | |

Source: PBA.ph

==== Game log ====
2013 PBA Commissioner's Cup game log
February

| Game | Date | Opponent | Score | High points | High rebounds | High assists | Location Attendance | Record | |
|---|---|---|---|---|---|---|---|---|---|
| 1 | February 8 | GlobalPort | 92–94 | Balkman (23) | Balkman (14) | Cabagnot (8) | Smart Araneta Coliseum | 0–1 | boxscore |
| 2 | February 13 | San Mig Coffee | 98–73 | Balkman (28) | Balkman (15) | Cabagnot (6) | Smart Araneta Coliseum | 1–1 | boxscore |
| 3 | February 17 | Barangay Ginebra | 105–90 | Balkman (34) | Balkman (10) | Miranda, Cabagnot (6) | Smart Araneta Coliseum | 2–1 | boxscore |
| 4 | February 20 | Meralco | 88–86 | Balkman (26) | Fajardo (12) | Washington (5) | Smart Araneta Coliseum | 3–1 | boxscore |

March

| Game | Date | Opponent | Score | High points | High rebounds | High assists | Location Attendance | Record | |
|---|---|---|---|---|---|---|---|---|---|
| 5 | March 1 | Air21 | 60–53 | Balkman (25) | Balkman (13) | Lanete (4) | Smart Araneta Coliseum | 4–1 | boxscore |
| 6 | March 3 | Barako Bull | 91–78 | Balkman (33) | Balkman (14) | Lanete (5) | Smart Araneta Coliseum | 5–1 | boxscore |
| 7 | March 8 | Alaska | 73–83 | Miranda (25) | Balkman (17) | Miranda (5) | Smart Araneta Coliseum | 5–2 | boxscore |
| 8 | March 16 | Rain or Shine | 87–79 | June Mar Fajardo | June Mar Fajardo | Alex Cabagnot | Panabo, Davao del Norte | 6–2 | |
| 9 | March 22 | Talk 'N Text | | | | | Smart Araneta Coliseum | | |

2012–13 schedule

==== Bracket ====
Quarterfinals
(#1 twice-to-beat)
1 | Alaska | 87
8 | Air21 | 81
(Best-of-3)
4 | San Mig Coffee | 2
5 | Meralco | 1
(#2 twice-to-beat)
2 | Rain or Shine | 83 | 79
7 | Barangay Ginebra | 90 | 81
(Best-of-3)
3 | Petron | 0
6 | Talk 'N Text | 2

Semifinals (Best-of-5)
1 | Alaska | 3
4 | San Mig Coffee | 1
7 | Barangay Ginebra | 3
6 | Talk 'N Text | 2

Finals (Best-of-5)
1 | Alaska | 3
7 | Barangay Ginebra | 0

== Governors' Cup ==
=== Eliminations ===
==== Standings ====
| Pos | Team | W | L | PCT | GB | Qualification |
|---|---|---|---|---|---|---|
| 1 | Petron Blaze Boosters | 8 | 1 | .889 | — | Twice-to-beat in the quarterfinals |
| 2 | San Mig Coffee Mixers | 6 | 3 | .667 | 2 | Twice-to-beat in the quarterfinals |
| 3 | Meralco Bolts | 5 | 4 | .556 (Note: Head-to-head record: Meralco 1–0 Rain or Shine) | 3 | Twice-to-beat in the quarterfinals |
| 4 | Rain or Shine Elasto Painters | 5 | 4 | .556 | 3 | Twice-to-beat in the quarterfinals |
| 5 | GlobalPort Batang Pier | 4 | 5 | .444 (Note: Head-to-head quotient: GlobalPort 1.01, Barako Bull 1.00, Alaska 0.99) | 4 | Twice-to-win in the quarterfinals |
| 6 | Barako Bull Energy | 4 | 5 | .444 | 4 | Twice-to-win in the quarterfinals |
| 7 | Alaska Aces | 4 | 5 | .444 | 4 | Twice-to-win in the quarterfinals |
| 8 | Barangay Ginebra San Miguel | 3 | 6 | .333 (Note: Head-to-head quotient: Talk 'N Text 1.05, Barangay Ginebra 1.00, Air21 0.96; eighth seed playoff: Barangay Ginebra 110–102 Talk 'N Text) | 5 | Twice-to-win in the quarterfinals |
| 9 | Talk 'N Text Tropang Texters | 3 | 6 | .333 | 5 | |
| 10 | Air21 Express | 3 | 6 | .333 | 5 | |

Source: PBA.ph

==== Bracket ====
Quarterfinals (Top 4 twice-to-beat)
1 | Petron Blaze | 101
8 | Barangay Ginebra | 94
4 | Rain or Shine | 108
5 | GlobalPort | 106
2 | San Mig Coffee | 105 | 83
7 | Alaska | 112 | 73
3 | Meralco | 86
6 | Barako Bull | 68

Semifinals (Best-of-5)
1 | Petron Blaze | 3
4 | Rain or Shine | 1
2 | San Mig Coffee | 3
3 | Meralco | 1

Finals (Best-of-7)
1 | Petron Blaze | 3
2 | San Mig Coffee | 4

== Transactions ==
=== Trades ===
==== Pre-season ====
| August 23, 2012 | To Petron Blaze Magi Sison (from Air21); Paolo Hubalde (from Air21); 2014 second round pick (from Air21) | To Air21 Nonoy Baclao (from Petron Blaze); Robert Reyes (from Petron Blaze); KG Canaleta (from Barangay Ginebra); John Wilson (from Barangay Ginebra) | To Barangay Ginebra Elmer Espiritu (from Air21); 2013 first round pick (from Air21) |

| August 31, 2012 | To Petron Blaze Wesley Gonzales; Hans Thiele | To Alaska Dondon Hontiveros |

==== Commissioner's Cup ====
| January 22, 2013 | To Petron Blaze Ronald Tubid | To Barako Bull Alex Mallari; Jojo Duncil; 2014 1st round pick (traded to San Mig Coffee) |

| June 10, 2013 | To Petron Blaze Jason Deutchman; 2016 and 2017 2nd round pick | To GlobalPort Jay Washington |

| August 12, 2013 | To Petron Blaze Doug Kramer | To Barako Bull Dorian Peña; 2013 2nd round pick (from Barangay Ginebra) |

=== Recruited imports ===
| Tournament | Name | Debuted | Last game | Record |
|---|---|---|---|---|
| Commissioner's Cup | Renaldo Balkman | February 8 (vs. GlobalPort) | March 8 (vs. Alaska) | 5–2 |
| Commissioner's Cup | Rodney White | March 22 (vs. Talk 'N Text) | March 27 (vs. Alaska) | 0–2 |
| Commissioner's Cup | Henry Sims | April 5 (vs. Meralco) | April 21 (vs. Talk 'N Text) | 2–4 |
| Governors' Cup | Elijah Millsap | August 16 (vs. Meralco) | October 25 (vs. San Mig Coffee) | 15–7 |
