= List of 2016–17 PBA season transactions =

This is a list of transactions that have taken place during the offseason and the 2016–17 PBA season.

== List of transactions ==
=== Retirement ===
Date	Name	Team(s) played (years)	Age	Notes	Ref.
September 10	Michael Burtscher	Alaska Aces (2009–2011); B-Meg Llamados (2012); San Miguel Beermen (2012–2013); Air21 Express (2013–2014); Kia Sorento/Kia Carnival (2014–2015)	31	2x PBA Champion (2010 Fiesta, 2012 Commissioner's)	
November 3	Jimmy Alapag	Talk 'N Text Phonepals/Talk 'N Text Tropang Texters (2003–2015); Meralco Bolts (2015–2016)	38	6× PBA Champion (2003 All-Filipino, 2009 Philippine, 2011 Philippine, 2011 Commissioner's, 2012 Philippine, 2013 Philippine); 1x PBA Finals MVP (2011 Commissioner's); 1x PBA Most Valuable Player (2011); 1x PBA Best Player of the Conference (2011 Commissioner's); 11× PBA All-Star (2003–2011, 2014, 2015); 1x PBA All-Star Game MVP (2004); 3× PBA Mythical First Team (2003, 2005, 2011); PBA Order of Merit (2010); PBA Rookie of the Year (2003); 1x PBA 3-Point Shootout Champion (2003); PBA's 40 Greatest Players; PBA 3-point all-time leading scorer	
November 18	Yousef Taha	Air21 Express (2012); Barangay Ginebra San Miguel (2012–2013); GlobalPort Batang Pier (2013, 2014, 2016); Petron Blaze Boosters (2013–2014); San Mig Super Coffee Mixers / Purefoods Star Hotshots / Star Hotshots (2014–2016)	28	1x PBA Champion (2014 Governor's)	
November 19	Nelbert Omolon	Sta. Lucia Realtors (2004–2010); Meralco Bolts (2010–2012, 2013–2014); Air21 Express (2012–2013); San Miguel Beermen (2014–2016)	36	4x PBA Champion (2007-08 Philippine, 2014-15 Philippine, 2015 Governors', 2015-16 Philippine); 1x PBA Mythical Second Team (2008; 1x PBA All-Defensive Team (2007); 2× PBA Blitz Game MVP (2005, 2006)	
May 7, 2017	Eric Menk	Tanduay Rhum Masters (1999–2001); Barangay Ginebra Kings/Barangay Ginebra San Miguel (2001–2013); San Miguel Beermen (ABL) (2013); GlobalPort Batang Pier (2013–2014); Alaska Aces (2014–2016)	42	4x PBA Champion (2004 Fiesta Conference, 2004-05 Philippine Cup, 2006-07 Philippine Cup, 2008 Fiesta Conference); 1x PBA Most Valuable Player (2005; 3x PBA Finals MVP (2004 Fiesta Conference, 2004-05 Philippine Cup, 2008 Fiesta Conference); 3× PBA Best Player of the Conference award (1999 All-Filipino, 2004 Fiesta, 2004-05 Philippine); 10x PBA All-Star (1999, 2000, 2003–2007, 2009–2011); 1x PBA Mythical First Team (2005); 1x PBA Mythical Second Team (1999); 1x PBA All-Defensive Team (1999); 1x ABL champion (2013); 3x PBL MVP (1997–1999); PBL Rookie of the Year (1997)	

== Coaching changes ==
=== Offseason ===
Departure date	Team	Outgoing head coach	Reason for departure	Hire date	Incoming head coach	Last coaching position	Ref.
October 7	NLEX	Boyet Fernandez	Still with NLEX with different capacity	October 7	Yeng Guiao	Rain or Shine head coach (2011–2016)	
October 7	Rain or Shine	Yeng Guiao	Resigned; Moves to NLEX	October 7	Caloy Garcia	Rain or Shine assistant coach (2011–2016)	
October 14	Star	Jason Webb	Appointed as team consultant	October 14	Chito Victolero	Kia Carnival/Kia Sorento/Mahindra Enforcer assistant coach (2014–2016)	
October 22	TNT	Jong Uichico	Fired	October 22	Nash Racela	TNT KaTropa assistant coach (2008–2016)	

== Player movements ==
=== Trades ===
==== Pre-season ====
October
October 27, 2016	To NLEX: Carlo Lastimosa	To Blackwater Elite: James Forrester; 2016 2nd Round Pick (Original Pick)
October 28, 2016	To GlobalPort: Rey Guevarra	To Meralco: Joseph Yeo
November
November 3, 2016	Three-team trade
November 3, 2016	To San Miguel: Keith Agovida (from Mahindra); RR Garcia (from Star)	To Mahindra: Ryan Araña (from San Miguel); 2018 1st round pick (from San Miguel); Alex Mallari (from Star)
November 3, 2016	To Star: Aldrech Ramos (from Mahindra); 2017 2nd round pick (from Star via NLEX)
November 8, 2016	To NLEX: Bradwyn Guinto; Chito Jaime	To Mahindra: Rob Reyes; Jeckster Apinan; Reden Celda
November 11, 2016	To GlobalPort: Mick Pennisi	To Phoenix: Doug Kramer
November 15, 2016	To TNT: 2019 2nd Round Pick	To GlobalPort: Aaron Aban
November 15, 2016	To TNT: Frank Golla	To Blackwater: Dylan Ababou
November 17, 2016	To Barangay Ginebra: 2019 2nd Round Pick	To Mahindra: Nico Salva

==== All-Filipino ====
December
December 9, 2016	To Star: Rome dela Rosa	To Alaska: Jake Pascual
February
February 18, 2017	To Alaska: Simon Enciso	To Phoenix: RJ Jazul
February 18, 2017	To Mahindra Prince Caperal	To Phoenix: Joseph Eriobu

==== Commissioner's Cup ====
March
March 28	Three-team trade
March 28	To NLEX: Rabeh Al-Hussaini (from Meralco)	To Blackwater: 2017 Second Round pick (from NLEX)
March 28	To Meralco: 2018 Second Round pick (from Blackwater)
March 29	To Globalport: Dylan Ababou; James Forrester	To Blackwater: Niño Canaleta
April
April 24, 2017	To San Miguel: Matt Ganuelas-Rosser	To TNT: RR Garcia
May
May 5
May 5	To Mahindra: Glenn Khobuntin; Eric Camson	To NLEX: Alex Mallari; Kenneth Ighalo; 2020 2nd Round pick
May 6	Four-team trade
May 6	To GlobalPort: Sean Anthony (from NLEX); Bradwyn Guinto (from NLEX); Jonathan Grey (from Meralco)	To NLEX: Larry Fonacier (from TNT); J. R. Quiñahan (from GlobalPort); 2017 2nd Round pick (from Meralco, originally from Mahindra); 2019 2nd Round pick (from GlobalPort)
May 6	To TNT: Anthony Semerad (from GlobalPort); 2017 1st Round Pick (from GlobalPort, originally from TNT)	To Meralco: Garvo Lanete (from NLEX)

=== Free agency ===
==== Additions ====
Player	Date signed	New team	Former team	Ref
Nino Canaleta		GlobalPort Batang Pier	Mahindra Enforcer	
Chris Lutz		Meralco Bolts	San Miguel Beermen	
Michael DiGregorio	February 20, 2017	Blackwater Elite	Mahindra Floodbuster	
Mark Cruz	March 30, 2017	Blackwater Elite		
Josh Urbiztondo	May 4, 2017	GlobalPort Batang Pier	Singapore Slingers	

=== Released ===
==== Waived ====
Player	Date waived	Former team	Ref
Niño Canaleta	November 1	Mahindra Enforcer	
Josh Urbiztondo	November 4	Phoenix Fuel Masters	
Mark Cruz	November 4	Phoenix Fuel Masters	
Gary David	November 6	San Miguel Beermen	
Dorian Peña	November 7	GlobalPort Batang Pier	
Mark Isip	November 7	GlobalPort Batang Pier	
Simon Atkins		Meralco Bolts	
Eric Menk		Alaska Aces	
Michael Mabulac		San Miguel Beermen	
Jerwin Gaco		Star Hotshots	
Roi Sumang	November 17	Blackwater Elite	
Ronald Pascual	November 17	Blackwater Elite	

== 2016 PBA draft ==
=== Previous years' draftees ===
Draft	Pick	Player	Date signed	Team	Previous team	Ref
2015	39	Samboy De Leon		Star Hotshots	—N/a	
2015	51	Mon Abundo		Star Hotshots	—N/a	
