= Alex Mallari =

Filipino-American basketball player

Personal information
- Born: March 26, 1987 (age 39) Long Beach, California, U.S.
- Listed height: 6 ft 4 in (1.93 m)
- Listed weight: 176 lb (80 kg)

Career information
- High school: Los Alamitos (Los Alamitos, California)
- College: Chabot (2005–2007); Lewis–Clark (2007–2009)
- PBA draft: 2012: 1st round, 3rd overall pick
- Drafted by: Petron Blaze Boosters
- Playing career: 2012–2020
- Position: Guard / small forward

Career history
- 2012–2013: Petron Blaze Boosters
- 2013–2016: San Mig Super Coffee Mixers / Purefoods Star Hotshots / Star Hotshots
- 2016–2017: Mahindra Floodbuster
- 2017–2018: NLEX Road Warriors
- 2019–2020: Phoenix Super LPG Fuel Masters

Career highlights
- 4× PBA champion (2013 Governors', 2013–14 Philippine, 2014 Commissioner's, 2014 Governors'); PBA All-Rookie Team (2013)

Alex Christopher Hale Mallari (born March 26, 1987) is a Filipino-American former professional basketball player in the Philippine Basketball Association (PBA). He was selected third overall in the 2012 PBA draft by the Petron Blaze Boosters.

== Amateur career ==
In high school, Mallari helped Los Alamitos High School win a championship in the Sunset League. He played just one year of college hoops at Lewis-Clark State College in Idaho, before spending the next two years out of the basketball scene. In 2011, he came to the Philippines to play in that year's Foundation Cup for the FCA Cultivators. During the 2011–12 Aspirants' Cup, he was involved in a freak accident in practice where his teammate poked his left eye. He had to get 10 stitches on his eyeball and sported a red left eye for weeks. His team only reached the semifinals that conference. In his last conference in the D-League, he helped his team earn a spot in the finals.

== Professional career ==
=== Petron Blaze Boosters (2012–2013) ===
Mallari entered the 2012 PBA draft after being on the D-League Mythical Five. He impressed in the draft workouts and combine, and was selected third overall by the Petron Blaze Boosters. In the 2012–13 Philippine Cup, he had 13 points in a loss to San Mig. In his time with Petron, he was often benched by their head coach in favor of Jojo Duncil.

=== San Mig / Purefoods franchise (2013–2016) ===
After his first conference, Mallari was traded from Petron to the San Mig Coffee Mixers as part of a 5-team, 10-player trade that also involved the Alaska Aces, Barako Bull Energy Cola and Barangay Ginebra San Miguel. There, he was Mark Barroca's backup. He struggled at first with being the point guard in Coach Tim Cone's system. He broke out during their 2013 Commissioner's Cup quarterfinals series against the Meralco Bolts. In Game 2, he had a career-high 16 points and seven rebounds as San Mig extended the series. San Mig eventually won that series. In the 2013 Governors' Cup, he stepped up in the semifinals by scoring 13 of his career-high 23 points in the fourth quarter of Game 3, as San Mig went on to take a 2–1 series lead. San Mig went on to face his former team Petron in the finals, and win the title in seven games. The following season, he and the team accomplished the rare feat of winning all three conferences, a Grand Slam.

Mallari continued to improve his game, becoming one of the team's best defenders. He re-signed with the team, now led by Coach Jason Webb. In a 2015–16 Philippine Cup win over Mahindra, he contributed 20 points to supplement Barroca's 26. He missed seven games of the Commissioner's Cup due to a hurt left foot.

=== Mahindra Floodbuster (2016–2017) ===
On October 31, 2016, during the offseason, Mallari was traded from the Star Hotshots to the Mahindra Floodbuster in exchange for Aldrech Ramos. In his team debut during the 2016–17 Philippine Cup, he had 17 points, nine rebounds, and two steals in a defeat to the GlobalPort Batang Pier. He then had 19 in a loss to the Phoenix Fuel Masters. Against the San Miguel Beermen, he had 21 points, but missed a three-pointer that could have sent the game into overtime as Mahindra lost their fourth straight game of the season. Mahindra finally got their first win of the season against the Blackwater Elite, in which he had a career-high-tying 23 points, 11 rebounds, four assists, and four steals. He then had a double-double of 13 points and 11 assists in a win over Meralco. Their streak was snapped in a loss to the TNT KaTropa, despite him producing 19 points, seven boards, and five assists. Their playoff hopes ended with a loss to the Alaska Aces. The following game, he had a career-high 30 points, and almost came away with a triple-double with 10 rebounds and nine assists as they got a win over NLEX.

To begin the 2017 Commissioner's Cup, Mallari scored 21 points, seven assists, and five rebounds in a loss to Meralco. After a loss to Alaska, head coach Chris Gavina called him out for complaining too much on non-calls, which forced him to bench Mallari late into the third quarter. In a loss to Star, he had 24 points. Against TNT, he had a double-double of 17 points and 11 rebounds, but with his team down three with five seconds left in the fourth, he went for two points which he missed, and Mahindra found itself with a record of 1–5. After a loss to Globalport, Coach Gavina called him and the rest of the team out for focusing too much on their stats and for a lack of maturity.

=== NLEX Road Warriors (2017–2018) ===
During the 2017 Commissioner's Cup, he was traded to the NLEX Road Warriors along with Kenneth Ighalo and a 2020 second-round pick in exchange for Eric Camson and Glenn Khobuntin. In his NLEX debut, he had 11 points in a loss to the Beermen. He helped NLEX close out the conference with a win despite not qualifying for the playoffs, as he tallied 22 points, nine rebounds, five assists, two steals and two blocks over Phoenix. In a 2017 Governors' Cup game against Phoenix, he joined forces with Carlo Lastimosa to help NLEX win its fourth straight game of the conference. NLEX then clinched a spot in the quarterfinals with a 103–100 win over SMB. He then had 19 points and nine rebounds in a loss to TNT. In the quarterfinals, they lost to Star.

Mallari started the 2017–18 Philippine Cup with 13 points in a win over the Kia Picanto. He had 12 points as NLEX dropped to a 2–3 record. He had 17 points and nine rebounds against the Rain or Shine Elasto Painters, but NLEX still lost, their fourth straight. NLEX ended their losing streak against Ginebra, in which he had 11 points and six rebounds. Despite their bad start, NLEX was able to make it as far as the semifinals, their first in franchise history. In Game 1 against the Hotshots, he had 14 points and the game-winning three pointer. In Game 4, he had 13 points, but the Hotshots tied the series 2–2. NLEX lost their next two games and were eliminated from the playoffs.

After NLEX started the 2018 Commissioner's Cup with no wins in three games, Mallari scored 13 points against Phoenix as they got their first win of the conference. That conference, he was often the focal point of the offense as the team had lost star guards Kevin Alas and Kiefer Ravena to an ACL injury and an 18-month ban from FIBA respectively.

=== Phoenix Super LPG Fuel Masters (2019–2020) ===
Four days before the 2018 PBA Draft, NLEX traded Mallari and Dave Marcelo to the Phoenix Super LPG Fuel Masters for the rights to the fourth pick of that year's draft and a 2019 second round pick. In his Phoenix debut during the 2019 season, he played 35 minutes and contributed 11 points, eight rebounds, and five assists in a win over Meralco. He then had 15 points as Phoenix outlasted TNT for an overtime victory. He contributed 12 points against Blackwater as they won their fourth straight. Phoenix finished eliminations with a 9–2 record, good for first in the playoffs. There, they lost to the Beermen in five games in the semifinals. During the 2019 Commissioner's Cup, he scored 10 of his 15 points in the fourth quarter and had the game-winning assist to Justin Chua against Alaska.

At the end of the 2020 season, Phoenix made Mallari a free agent.

== PBA career statistics ==
Legend
GP	Games played	MPG	Minutes per game
FG%	Field-goal percentage	3P%	3-point field-goal percentage	FT%	Free-throw percentage
RPG	Rebounds per game	APG	Assists per game	SPG	Steals per game
BPG	Blocks per game	PPG	Points per game	**Bold**	Career high

=== Season-by-season averages ===
Year	Team	GP	MPG	FG%	3P%	FT%	RPG	APG	SPG	BPG	PPG
2012–13	Petron	51	19.4	.372	**.265**	.533	2.7	1.6	.5	**.3**	5.5
2012–13	San Mig Coffee	51	19.4	.372	**.265**	.533	2.7	1.6	.5	**.3**	5.5
2013–14	San Mig Super Coffee	**68**	14.9	.334	.263	.527	2.1	1.3	.4	.1	4.0
2014–15	Purefoods / Star	45	22.7	.393	.255	**.641**	3.6	2.3	.5	**.3**	8.0
2015–16	Star	26	19.8	.357	.239	.594	3.0	1.4	.6	.1	6.5
2016–17	Mahindra	33	**28.6**	**.404**	.225	.576	**6.1**	**3.9**	**1.1**	.2	**13.5**
2016–17	NLEX	33	**28.6**	**.404**	.225	.576	**6.1**	**3.9**	**1.1**	.2	**13.5**
2017–18	NLEX	34	22.8	.352	.252	.639	4.1	2.7	.6	.2	8.2
2019	Phoenix Pulse	38	25.9	.399	.261	.589	3.1	2.7	1.0	**.3**	8.4
2020	Phoenix Super LPG	10	16.0	.298	.250	.556	2.5	1.7	.6	.1	4.4
Career		305	21.0	.375	.252	.584	3.4	2.2	.6	.2	7.1

== Personal life ==
Mallari was previously in a relationship with Miakka Lim, daughter of basketball coach Frankie Lim. He currently runs a bistro in La Union, and takes up surfing as a hobby.
