= 2013 PBA Governors' Cup finals =

Basketball tournament in the Philippines

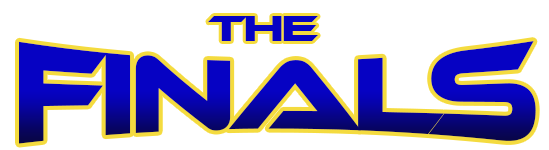
Team	Coach	Wins
(2) San Mig Coffee Mixers	Tim Cone	4
(1) Petron Blaze Boosters	Gee Abanilla	3
- Dates: October 11–25, 2013
- MVP: Marc Pingris
- Television: Sports5 on TV5
- Announcers: See broadcast notes
- Radio network: DZSR

Referees
- Game 1: N. Quilingen, P. Balao, R. Gruta
- Game 2: E. Quirino, J. Mariano, S. Pineda
- Game 3: N. Quilingen, P. Balao, E. Aquino
- Game 4: P. Balao, N. Sambrano, E. Aquino
- Game 5: A. Herrera, P. Balao, N. Sambrano
- Game 6: P. Balao, J. Mariano, E. Aquino
- Game 7: A. Herrera, N. Sambrano, S. Pineda

PBA Governors' Cup finals chronology
- < 2012 2014 >

PBA finals chronology
- < 2013 Commissioner's 2013–14 Philippine >

The 2013 Philippine Basketball Association (PBA) Governors' Cup finals, also known as the 2013 PLDT Telpad PBA Governors' Cup finals for sponsorship reasons, was the best-of-7 championship series of the 2013 PBA Governors' Cup, and the conclusion of the conference's playoffs. Petron Blaze and San Mig Coffee competed for the 109th championship contested by the league. This was the first time the two teams met in the finals since the 2000 PBA Governors' Cup finals when the Petron Blaze Boosters (then known as the San Miguel Beermen) defeated the San Mig Coffee Mixers (then known as the Purefoods TJ Hotdogs) in five games.

== Background ==
In the elimination round, the Blaze Boosters lost their first game. From there, they went on a 11-game winning streak for the best record in the league that also included a win over Barangay Ginebra in the first round. Their run was fueled by import Elijah Millsap (averaging 27.2 points, 11.9 rebounds, 5.0 assists, 2.2 steals, and two made triples a game), improved efficient play from national team member June Mar Fajardo (averaging a near double-double of 11.6 ppg, 9.6 rpg, with 1.6 bpg), the veteran presence of Alex Cabagnot and Arwind Santos, breakout three-point shooting from Marcio Lassiter, and a bench that could go 10 deep. Defeating the Rain or Shine Elasto Painters 3–1 gave them their 27th finals appearance for the chance at their 20th title.

San Mig, as the 2nd seed with a 6–3 elimination round record, leaned on its chemistry and defense to win games. Although losing Allein Maliksi to an injury hurt their depth, their import Marqus Blakely gave them needed athleticism and rim protection. They beat the Alaska Aces in the first round, then the Meralco Bolts 3–1 in the semifinals for their 24th finals appearance and a chance at their 10th title. Head coach Tim Cone was also going for his 15th title, which would tie him for most all-time for a coach with Baby Dalupan.

=== Road to the finals ===
San Mig Coffee		Petron Blaze
Finished 6–3 (0.667): 2nd	Elimination round	Finished 8–1 (0.889):1st
Def. Alaska in one game (105–112, 83–74)	Quarterfinals	Def. Barangay Ginebra in two games (101–94)
Def. Meralco, 3–1	Semifinals	Def. Rain or Shine, 3–1

=== Head-to-head matchup ===
The conference head-to-head matchup was on August 31, 2013 at the Mall of Asia Arena.

August 31, 2013

recap

San Mig Coffee Mixers 83, Petron Blaze Boosters 89

Mall of Asia Arena, Pasay

== Series summary ==
Team	Game 1	Game 2	Game 3	Game 4	Game 5	Game 6	Game 7	Wins
San Mig Coffee	84	100	68	88	114	88	87	4
Petron Blaze	100	93	90	86	103	99	77	3
Venue	MOA	Araneta	Araneta	MOA	Araneta	Araneta	Araneta

=== Game 1 ===
Sports5 on TV5

October 11
8:00 p.m.

boxscore

San Mig Coffee Mixers 84, Petron Blaze Boosters 100
Scoring by quarter: 18–23, 18–18, 25–18, 23–41
Pts: Blakely 23; Rebs: Blakely 14; Asts: de Ocampo 6	Pts: Millsap 35; Rebs: Millsap 10; Asts: Millsap 10
Petron Blaze leads series, 1–0

Mall of Asia Arena, Pasay
Attendance: 12,518
Referees: N. Quilingen, P. Balao, R. Gruta

=== Game 2 ===
Sports5 on TV5

October 13
4:30 p.m.

boxscore

San Mig Coffee Mixers 100, Petron Blaze Boosters 93
Scoring by quarter: 30–24, 19–21, 25–18, 26–31
Pts: Blakely 23; Rebs: Blakely 16; Asts: Blakely 6	Pts: Millsap 31; Rebs: Fajardo 14; Asts: Millsap 4
Series tied, 1–1

Smart Araneta Coliseum, Quezon City
Attendance: 12,072
Referees: E. Quirino, J. Mariano, S. Pineda

=== Game 3 ===
Sports5 on TV5

October 16
8:00 p.m.

boxscore

San Mig Coffee Mixers 68, Petron Blaze Boosters 90
Scoring by quarter: 20–28, 10–27, 22–22, 16–13
Pts: Blakely 17; Rebs: Blakely 10; Asts: Blakely, Pingris 4	Pts: Millsap 28; Rebs: Fajardo 9 Asts: Lutz 5
Petron Blaze leads series, 2–1

Smart Araneta Coliseum, Quezon City
Attendance: 12,314
Referees: N. Quilingen, P. Balao, E. Aquino

=== Game 4 ===
Sports5 on TV5

October 18
8:00 p.m.

boxscore

San Mig Coffee Mixers 88, Petron Blaze Boosters 86
Scoring by quarter: 33–13, 19–16, 15–34, 21–23
Pts: Blakely 19; Rebs: Blakely 13; Asts: Blakely 6	Pts: Millsap 33; Rebs: Fajardo 26; Asts: Millsap 4
Series tied, 2–2

Mall of Asia Arena, Pasay
Referees: P. Balao, N. Sambrano, E. Aquino

=== Game 5 ===
Sports5 on TV5

October 20
4:30 p.m.

Boxscore

San Mig Coffee Mixers 114, Petron Blaze Boosters 103
Scoring by quarter: 21–18, 33–36, 33–26, 27–23
Pts: Blakely 30; Rebs: Blakely 15; Asts: Barroca 10	Pts: Millsap 37; Rebs: Fajardo 16; Asts: Cabagnot 7
San Mig Coffee leads series, 3–2

Smart Araneta Coliseum, Quezon City
Attendance: 12,137
Referees: A. Herrera, P. Balao, N. Sambrano

=== Game 6 ===
Sports5 on TV5

October 23
8:30 p.m.

boxscore

San Mig Coffee Mixers 88, Petron Blaze Boosters 99
Scoring by quarter: 19–28, 20–24, 24–22, 25–25
Pts: Blakely 21; Rebs: Blakely11; Asts: Mallari, Pingris 4	Pts: Millsap 30; Rebs: Fajardo 14; Asts: Millsap, Cabagnot, Santos 6
Series tied, 3–3

Smart Araneta Coliseum, Quezon City
Attendance: 15,018
Referees: P. Balao, J. Mariano, E. Aquino

=== Game 7 ===
Sports5 on TV5

October 25
7:15 p.m.

boxscore

San Mig Coffee Mixers 87, Petron Blaze Boosters 77
Scoring by quarter: 19-19, 22–20, 24–22, 22–16
Pts: Blakely, Pingris 19; Rebs: Pingris 17; Asts: Barroca 4	Pts: Millsap 25; Rebs: Fajardo 15; Asts: Cabagnot 8
San Mig Coffee wins series, 4–3

Smart Araneta Coliseum, Quezon City
Attendance: 21,319
Referees: A. Herrera, N. Sambrano, S. Pineda

== Rosters ==
San Mig Coffee Mixers roster
Players
Coaches

Pos.	#	POB	Name	Height	Weight	DOB (YYYY–MM–DD)	From
C	4	(United States)	Rafi Reavis	6 ft 8 in (2.03 m)	205 lb (93 kg)		Coppin State
SG	8	(Philippines)	Peter June Simon	6 ft 1 in (1.85 m)	180 lb (82 kg)		Mindanao
PG	9	(Philippines)	Lester Alvarez (R)	5 ft 8 in (1.73 m)	154 lb (70 kg)		Adamson
PF	10	(Philippines)	Jewel Ponferada (R)	6 ft 5 in (1.96 m)	210 lb (95 kg)		National-U
SG	11	(United States)	Alex Mallari (R)	6 ft 4 in (1.93 m)	167 lb (76 kg)		Lewis–Clark State
PG	14	(Philippines)	Mark Barroca	5 ft 10 in (1.78 m)	170 lb (77 kg)		Far Eastern
PF	15	(Philippines)	Marc Pingris	6 ft 5 in (1.96 m)	210 lb (95 kg)		PSBA
SG	18	(Philippines)	James Yap	6 ft 3 in (1.91 m)	205 lb (93 kg)		UE
SF	19	(Philippines)	Jerwin Gaco	6 ft 4 in (1.93 m)	180 lb (82 kg)		De La Salle
G/F	22	(Philippines)	Allein Maliksi	6 ft 3 in (1.91 m)	180 lb (82 kg)		UST
G/F	23	(United States)	Marqus Blakely (I)	6 ft 5 in (1.96 m)	225 lb (102 kg)		Vermont
SF	30	(Philippines)	Leo Najorda	6 ft 3 in (1.91 m)	190 lb (86 kg)		San Sebastian
SF	33	(Philippines)	Val Acuña	6 ft 4 in (1.93 m)	179 lb (81 kg)		UE
PF	38	(United States)	Joe Devance	6 ft 7 in (2.01 m)	215 lb (98 kg)		UTEP
C	55	(Philippines)	Gian Chiu (R/IN)	6 ft 9 in (2.06 m)	235 lb (107 kg)		Oberlin
C	95	(Philippines)	Yancy De Ocampo	6 ft 9 in (2.06 m)	220 lb (100 kg)		Saint Francis of Assisi

Head coach

- (United States) Tim Cone (George Washington)

Assistant coach(es)

- (Philippines) Richard del Rosario (De La Salle)
- (Philippines) Olsen Racela (Ateneo)
- (Philippines) Johnny Abarrientos (Far Eastern)
- (United States) Jeffrey Cariaso (Sonoma State)

Team manager

- (Philippines) Alvin Patrimonio (Mapúa)

Legend

- (C) Team captain
- (CI) Commissioner's Cup Import
- (GI) Governors' Cup Import
- (EI) EASL Import
- (DP) Unsigned draft pick
- (FA) Free agent
- (IN) Inactive
- (S) Suspended
- (R) Rookie
- Injured

Roster

Petron Blaze Boosters roster
Players
Coaches

Pos.	#	POB	Name	Height	Weight	DOB (YYYY–MM–DD)	From
F	1	(United States)	Elijah Millsap (I)	6 ft 4 in (1.93 m)	200 lb (91 kg)		UAB
PG	2	(Philippines)	Dennis Miranda	6 ft 0 in (1.83 m)	185 lb (84 kg)		Far Eastern
SF	3	(United States)	Chris Lutz	6 ft 3 in (1.91 m)	200 lb (91 kg)		Marshall
PG	5	(Philippines)	Alex Cabagnot (C)	5 ft 10 in (1.78 m)	175 lb (79 kg)		Hawaiʻi–Hilo
SF	7	(United States)	Jason Deutchman (R)	6 ft 6 in (1.98 m)	212 lb (96 kg)		San Diego State
PF	10	(Philippines)	Danny Ildefonso	6 ft 6 in (1.98 m)	215 lb (98 kg)		National-U
PF	12	(Philippines)	Mark Isip	6 ft 5 in (1.96 m)	220 lb (100 kg)		Far Eastern
SF	13	(United States)	Marcio Lassiter	6 ft 2 in (1.88 m)	185 lb (84 kg)		Cal State Fullerton
G	21	(Philippines)	Paolo Hubalde	5 ft 11 in (1.80 m)	170 lb (77 kg)		UE
C	22	(Philippines)	June Mar Fajardo (R)	6 ft 11 in (2.11 m)	250 lb (113 kg)		Cebu
F/C	24	(Philippines)	Magi Sison	6 ft 7 in (2.01 m)	210 lb (95 kg)		UP Diliman
PG	26	(Philippines)	Chico Lanete	6 ft 0 in (1.83 m)	180 lb (82 kg)		Lyceum
SF	29	(Philippines)	Arwind Santos	6 ft 4 in (1.93 m)	170 lb (77 kg)		Far Eastern
F/C	44	(Philippines)	Doug Kramer	6 ft 5 in (1.96 m)	210 lb (95 kg)		Ateneo
SG	71	(Philippines)	Ronald Tubid	6 ft 1 in (1.85 m)	185 lb (84 kg)		UE

Head coach

- (Philippines) Gee Abanilla (De La Salle)

Assistant coach(es)

- (Philippines) Leo Austria (Lyceum)
- (Philippines) Koy Banal (Mapúa)
- (Philippines) Biboy Ravanes (Cebu)
- (United States) John Todd Purves

Team manager

- (Philippines) Siot Tanquingcen (UST)

Legend

- (C) Team captain
- (CI) Commissioner's Cup Import
- (GI) Governors' Cup Import
- (EI) EASL Import
- (DP) Unsigned draft pick
- (FA) Free agent
- (IN) Inactive
- (S) Suspended
- (R) Rookie
- Injured

Roster

== Broadcast notes ==
Game	Play-by-play	Analyst(s)	Courtside reporters	Sports5 Center Analysts
Game 1	Magoo Marjon	Jason Webb	Erika Padilla	Aaron Atayde and Nikko Ramos
Game 2	Mico Halili	Quinito Henson	Sel Guevara	Aaron Atayde and Benjie Paras
Game 3	Charlie Cuna	Dominic Uy	Rizza Diaz	Nikko Ramos and Ronnie Magsanoc
Game 4	Rado Dimalibot	Eric Reyes	Rizza Diaz	Mico Halili and Benjie Paras
Game 5	Magoo Marjon	Jason Webb	Erika Padilla	Aaron Atayde, Benjie Paras and Chot Reyes
Game 6	Mico Halili	Jason Webb	Nikko Ramos and Rizza Diaz	Aaron Atayde, Ronnie Magsanoc and Chot Reyes
Game 7	Magoo Marjon	Jason Webb	Nikko Ramos and Erika Padilla	Mico Halili, Ronnie Magsanoc and Chot Reyes

- Additional Game 7 crew:
  - Trophy presentation: Aaron Atayde
  - Dugout celebration interviewer: Nikko Ramos

=== TV ratings ===
Game	AGB Nielsen Mega Manila	TNS/Kantar national
Game 1	9.5%	4.5%
Game 2	9%	5.3%
Game 3	9.4%	4.9%
Game 4	10.2%	5.7%
Game 5	7.9%	4.7%
Game 6	11.7%	7%
Game 7	15.4%	8.8%
Average	10.4	5.8%
