= Gee Abanilla =

Filipino basketball player, coach and executive

San Miguel Beermen
- Position: Team manager
- League: PBA

Career information
- College: De La Salle
- PBA draft: 1993: 4th round
- Drafted by: 7 Up Uncolas

Career history

Coaching
- 1998–2002: De La Salle (assistant)
- 1999–2000: Purefoods Tender Juicy Hotdogs (assistant)
- 2001: Tanduay Rhum Masters (assistant)
- 2002–2003: FedEx Express (assistant)
- 2004–2009: Red Bull Barako (assistant)
- 2008–2009: Benilde
- 2009–2013: San Miguel/Petron (assistant)
- 2011–2013: De La Salle
- 2013–2014: Petron Blaze Boosters

Career highlights
- As player: 2x UAAP champion (1989, 1990); 4× PBL champion (1988 Freedom, 1989 Invitational, 1989 Maharlika, 1990 Maharlika); As assistant coach: 3× PBA champion (2005–06 Fiesta, 2009 Fiesta, 2011 Governors'); 4× UAAP champion (1998–2001); As executive: 12× PBA champion (2014–15 Philippine, 2015 Governors', 2015–16 Philippine, 2016–17 Philippine, 2017 Commissioner's, 2017–18 Philippine, 2019 Philippine, 2019 Commissioner's, 2022 Philippine, 2023–24 Commissioner's, 2025 Philippine, 2025–26 Philippine)

Gelacio "Gee" Abanilla is a Filipino basketball player, coach, and executive who currently serving as the Team Manager for the San Miguel Beermen of the Philippine Basketball Association (PBA).

== Playing career ==
He played for the DLSU Green Archers in the UAAP and with Magnolia Ice Cream in the PBL which were both coached by Derrick Pumaren. He was 4th round pick of 7-Up Bottlers during the 1993 PBA Draft.

== Coaching career ==
=== Assistant coach ===
He was once an assistant coach of De La Salle Green Archers, Purefoods TJ Hotdogs, FedEx Express, ICTSI-La Salle, and Red Bull Barako respectively from 1998 to 2009. In Red Bull, he was an assistant from 2004 until 2009.

He is also served as an assistant coach with the San Miguel Beermen in the PBA.

=== CSB head coach ===
He replaced Caloy Garcia and led them to a rollercoaster season, pouched only 4 wins out of 14 outings. But, they slightly improved under him. Due to hectic schedules, he told the CSB management that he would not coach them for a while but he will also return to the bench by July. For the record, assistant coach and PBA commentator Richard del Rosario took over.

=== Hapee Toothpaste head coach ===
He replaced Louie Alas in 2008, after Alas resigned after the season before due to back-to-back finals losses to Harbour Centre Batang Pier. Another roller-coaster conference and a semifinals slot are the highlights of Gee's stint with Hapee.

=== De La Salle head coach ===
On October 25, 2011, De La Salle University announced the formal appointment of Abanilla as the new head coach of the Green Archers during a gathering of team supporters at the Manila Polo Club. He replaces Dindo Pumaren, who resigned after a dismal UAAP Season 74 campaign, with DLSU going out of final four contention for the second time since 2009.

On his first season as head coach, Abanilla was able to steer the Green Archers to a final four appearance.

On June 8, 2013, it was announced that Abanilla has been replaced by Juno Sauler, one of his assistant coaches, as DLSU head coach. Abanilla is said to be being recalled to the Petron Blaze Boosters.

=== Petron's head coach ===
He later head coached the Petron Blaze Boosters, which he led into a finals stint in his first conference and a semifinals run in the next conference.

== Executive career ==
After coaching the Beermen, he was promoted by the management into manager and replaced by assistant Biboy Ravanes.

== Coaching record ==
=== Collegiate record ===
Season	Team	Elimination round					Playoffs				
Season	Team	GP	W	L	PCT	Finish	GP	W	L	PCT	Results
2008	CSB	14	4	10	.286	6th	—	—	—	—	Eliminated
2012	DLSU	14	9	5	.642	4th	2	1	1	.500	Semifinals
Totals		28	13	15	.464		2	1	1	.500	0 championships

=== PBA ===
Season	Conference	Team	Elimination round					Playoffs				
Season	Conference	Team	GP	W	L	PCT	Finish	GP	W	L	PCT	Results
2012–13	Governors' Cup	Petron	9	8	1	.889	1st	12	7	5	.583	Runner-up
2013–14	Philippine Cup	Petron	14	10	4	.714	3rd	7	3	4	.428	Semifinals
Career total			23	18	5	.782	Playoff Total	19	10	9	.526	0 championships

Preceded by Olsen Racela	Petron Blaze Boosters head coach 2013-2014	Succeeded by Biboy Ravanes
Preceded by Caloy Garcia	CSB Blazers head coach 2008-2009	Succeeded by Richard del Rosario
Preceded by Louie Alas	Hapee Toothpaste head coach 2008-?	Succeeded by Edgar Macaraya
Preceded by Dindo Pumaren	De La Salle Green Archers head coach 2011-2013	Succeeded by Juno Sauler
