= Aldrech Ramos =

Filipino basketball player (born 1988)

No. 17 – San Juan Knights
- Position: Power forward / center
- League: MPBL

Personal information
- Born: April 3, 1988 (age 38) Cebu City, Philippines
- Listed height: 6 ft 6 in (1.98 m)
- Listed weight: 190 lb (86 kg)

Career information
- High school: Olivarez College (Parañaque)
- College: FEU
- PBA draft: 2012: 1st round, 5th overall pick
- Drafted by: Barako Bull Energy Cola
- Playing career: 2012–present

Career history
- 2012–2013: San Mig Coffee Mixers
- 2013–2014: Alaska Aces
- 2014: Air21 Express
- 2014–2015: NLEX Road Warriors
- 2015–2016: Mahindra Enforcer
- 2016–2019: Star/Magnolia Hotshots
- 2020–2025: Terrafirma Dyip
- 2025–present: San Juan Knights

Career highlights
- 2× PBA champion (2013 Commissioner's, 2018 Governors'); PBA All-Star (2017); 2× UAAP Mythical Team (2010, 2011)

John Aldrech Ramos (born April 3, 1988) is a Filipino professional basketball player for the San Juan Knights of the Maharlika Pilipinas Basketball League (MPBL). At 6'6", he plays both the power forward and center positions. Ramos is also a decent outside shooter. He was part of the FEU Tamaraws team who played back to back finals in seasons 73 and 74 against the Ateneo Blue Eagles.

== College career ==
Ramos spent his college career in FEU for four years. During his sophomore campaign, he tallied a double-double including a collegiate career high 22 points with 13 rebounds on a 90–63 blowout against UST Growling Tigers on August 6, 2009. On his third year with the Tamaraws, he averaged 10.8 points, 8.2 rebounds and 1.8 blocks per game helping the number one seed Tamaraws to a 12–2 record. He finished third in MVP voting that year, losing to his teammate RR Garcia.

=== College statistics ===
Year	Team	GP	MPG	FG%	3P%	FT%	RPG	APG	SPG	BPG	PPG
2008	FEU	16	26.0	.510	.000	.690	7.5	1.1	.2	2.9	7.8
2009	FEU	15	31.3	.490	.400	.700	11.5	1.3	.5	1.6	11.5
2010	FEU	17	27.0	.540	.500	.790	8.2	1.6	.2	1.9	10.9
2011	FEU	13	34.2	.500	.230	.700	10.8	1.7	.7	1.1	11.8
Career		61	29.6	.510	.376	.720	9.5	1.4	.4	1.9	10.5

*Stats courtesy of Inboundpass.com

== Professional career ==
Ramos declared for the PBA draft after his final stint with the Tamaraws. He was selected fifth overall by the Barako Bull but then later traded to B-Meg in exchange for Sean Anthony and that year's 12th pick (who turned out to be Dave Marcelo).

On January 22, 2013, Ramos was once again acquired by Barako Bull together with JC Intal and Jonas Villanueva from the Mixers in exchange for Alex Mallari, Leo Najorda, Lester Alvarez plus Petron’s 2014 first-round pick. He was then sent to Alaska Aces on the same day in exchange for Mac Baracael. He scored 15 points and grabbed four rebounds in a loss against the Meralco Bolts on December 9, 2012.

On March 10, 2014, Ramos was dealt to Air21 (now known as the NLEX Road Warriors) in exchange for Vic Manuel.

On August 25, 2015, Ramos was traded by NLEX to Mahindra Enforcer, together with Niño Canaleta and Rob Reyes for Troy Rosario.

On October 31, 2016, Ramos was traded again, this time to the Star Hotshots in exchange for Alex Mallari.

== PBA career statistics ==
Legend
GP	Games played	MPG	Minutes per game	FG%	Field-goal percentage
3FG%	3-point field-goal percentage	4P%	4-point field-goal percentage	FT%	Free-throw percentage
RPG	Rebounds per game	APG	Assists per game	SPG	Steals per game
BPG	Blocks per game	PPG	Points per game	127	Career high

As of the end of 2024–25 season

=== Season-by-season averages ===
Year	Team	GP	MPG	FG%	3P%	4P%	FT%	RPG	APG	SPG	BPG	PPG
2012–13	San Mig Coffee	31	7.6	.526	.286	—	.636	1.2	.1	.1	.2	3.1
2012–13	Alaska	31	7.6	.526	.286	—	.636	1.2	.1	.1	.2	3.1
2013–14	Alaska	38	20.7	.429	.333	—	.737	3.6	.4	.2	.4	6.4
2013–14	Air21	38	20.7	.429	.333	—	.737	3.6	.4	.2	.4	6.4
2014–15	NLEX	36	19.7	.424	.397	—	.609	3.2	.4	.1	.3	6.1
2015–16	Mahindra	35	26.7	.512	.475	—	.900	5.7	.8	.5	.5	13.3
2016–17	Star	50	16.8	.487	.493	—	.735	3.5	.8	.2	.3	7.5
2017–18	Magnolia	44	14.7	.370	.319	—	.840	2.4	.6	.3	.3	6.3
2019	Magnolia	34	12.1	.383	.309	—	.692	2.4	.5	.1	.7	4.8
2020	Terrafirma	11	22.9	.507	.433	—	.846	4.0	1.5	.5	.4	8.7
2021	Terrafirma	22	25.8	.461	.417	—	.667	5.2	1.3	.2	.6	9.8
2022–23	Terrafirma	30	22.7	.454	.354	—	.800	4.4	.9	.2	.7	7.2
2023–24	Terrafirma	25	14.8	.476	.296	—	.571	2.0	.8	.3	.3	3.7
2024–25	Terrafirma	29	18.8	.478	.395	—	1.000	3.3	.7	.1	.3	4.9
Career		385	18.1	.454	.386	—	.783	3.3	.7	.2	.4	6.8
