= Gian Chiu =

Filipino basketball player

Personal information
- Born: January 20, 1989 (age 37) Quezon City, Philippines
- Listed height: 6 ft 9 in (2.06 m)
- Listed weight: 225 lb (102 kg)

Career information
- High school: Ateneo (Quezon City); Desert Christian (Bermuda Dunes, California)
- College: Oberlin (2007–2009)
- PBA draft: 2012: 2nd round, 27th overall pick
- Drafted by: B-Meg Llamados
- Playing career: 2013–2014
- Position: Center

Career history
- 2013–2014: San Mig Coffee Mixers
- 2014: Barako Bull Energy Cola

Career highlights
- PBA champion (2013 Governors')

Gian Chiu (born January 20, 1989) is a Filipino former professional basketball player. He last played for Barako Bull Energy of the Philippine Basketball Association (PBA). He was drafted 27th overall in the 2012 PBA Draft by the B-Meg Llamados.

== High school career ==
Chiu started his high school career in the Philippines with the Ateneo High School. Chiu found his way to the States after a Golden State Warriors scout discovered him, and that scout, who happened to be a friend of one of the assistant coaches at Desert Christian, recommended the assistant coach to recruit Chiu. As a senior at Desert Christian, Chiu averaged 16.6 points, 11.7 rebounds and 1.3 blocked shots. He hit 52% from the field, scored at least 20 points in eight of 24 games and fired a high of 29 in Desert Christian's 62–48 win over Bloomington Christian. Chiu earned All-Conference second team honors and was named for the World Quest Academic team for being an A-student.

== Collegiate career ==
Chiu is part of the 2007-08/2008-09 Oberlin Yeomen men's basketball team. He played in 25 of Oberlin's 26 games in first season with Yeomen. As a freshman, Chiu was one of three players to start more than 17 games (21), compile three double-figure games including a career-high 15 against Kenyon (2/13/08). He led the team in charges taken with 11. He finished the season being third on the team in field goal percentage (.462). Chiu was among the team leaders in blocked shots (2nd – 12), rebounds (3rd – 57), scoring (5th – 5.4 points per game), and minutes played (5th – 19.8 per game).

== Professional career ==
Chiu was the 27th overall pick in the 2012 PBA draft by the B-Meg Llamados.

== Statistics ==
Legend
GP	Games played	MPG	Minutes per game
FG%	Field-goal percentage	3P%	3-point field-goal percentage	FT%	Free-throw percentage
RPG	Rebounds per game	APG	Assists per game	SPG	Steals per game
BPG	Blocks per game	PPG	Points per game	**Bold**	Career high

=== College statistics ===
Year	Team	GP	MPG	FG%	3P%	FT%	RPG	APG	SPG	BPG	PPG
2007–08	Oberlin College	**25**	**19.76**	**.462**	0	**0.619**	**2.3**	**0.4**	**0.24**	**0.48**	**5.4**
2008–09	Oberlin College	6	4.3	.4	0	0	**0.7**	0.2	0.2	0	0.7
