= Doug Kramer =

Filipino basketball player (born 1983)

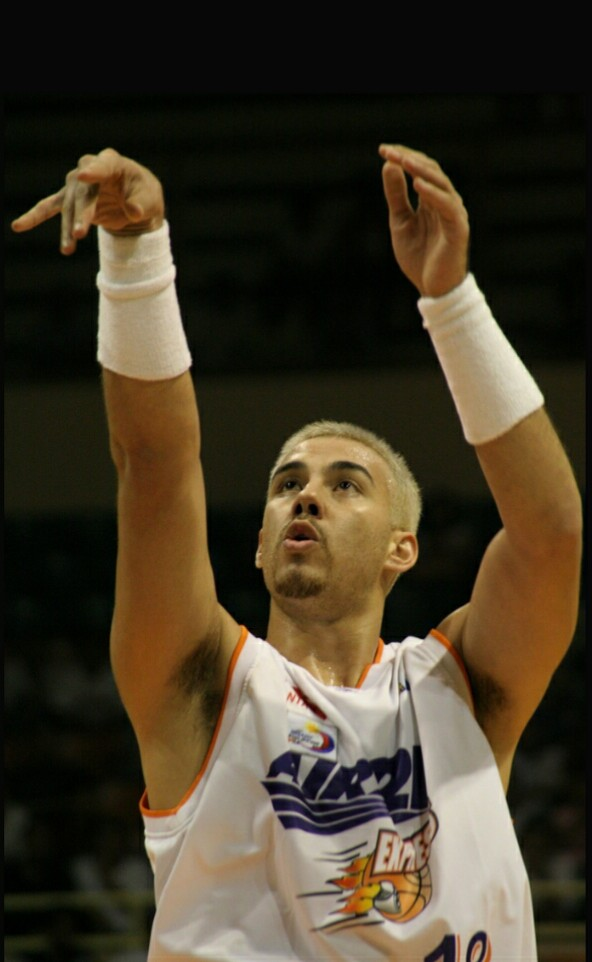
- Doug Kramer with Air 21 in 2007

Personal information
- Born: July 10, 1983 (age 43) Baguio, Philippines
- Listed height: 6 ft 5 in (1.96 m)
- Listed weight: 235 lb (107 kg)

Career information
- High school: The Risen Lord Academy (Baguio)
- College: Ateneo
- PBA draft: 2007: 1st round, 5th overall pick
- Drafted by: Air21 Express
- Playing career: 2007–2019
- Position: Center / power forward

Career history
- 2007–2009: Air21 Express
- 2009–2010: Barangay Ginebra Kings
- 2010: Air21 Express
- 2010–2011: Rain or Shine Elasto Painters
- 2011–2012: Powerade Tigers
- 2012–2013: Barako Bull Energy Cola
- 2013–2015: Petron Blaze Boosters / San Miguel Beermen
- 2015–2016: GlobalPort Batang Pier
- 2016–2019: Phoenix Pulse Fuel Masters

Career highlights
- PBA champion (2014–15 Philippine); PBA All-Defensive Team (2012); PBA All-Rookie Team (2008); UAAP champion (2002); PBL Mythical Team Best Power Forward (with Cebuana Lhuillier) (2007); WPBA Champion (2015)

Douglas Rimorin Kramer (born July 10, 1983) is a Filipino former basketball player. Playing power forward for the Ateneo Blue Eagles, he then played for eight teams in the Philippine Basketball Association (PBA).

== Early life ==
Kramer grew up in Baguio. His father was an oil engineer, while his mother stayed at home. He studied at a Christian school in his high school years.

== College career ==
=== Ateneo Blue Eagles ===
In his rookie season, the Eagles won the Season 65 championship.

In UAAP Season 68, Kramer had a season-high 18 points alongside 12 rebounds and two blocks in a win over the NU Bulldogs. That season, Ateneo reached the semifinals.

Kramer returned for his final season with Ateneo. In Season 69, Kramer set a college career-high 19 rebounds along with 3 blocks and 16 points in Ateneo's 98–88 win over UP on August 20, 2006. He then made the famous Game 1 winning shot of the Ateneo vs. UST in Game 1 of the championship on Sept. 24, 2006. His team ended up losing Games 2 and 3 to eventual champions, UST.

== Professional career ==
=== Air21 Express ===
Kramer was drafted fifth overall by the Air 21 Express in the 2007 PBA draft. He was signed to a three-year, ₱7,000,000 deal.

=== Barangay Ginebra Kings ===
In 2009, Kramer and JC Intal were shipped to the Barangay Ginebra Kings for draft picks. Due to Ginebra's depth at the time, he was often on the bench and did not get to play much.

=== Return to Air21 ===
In 2010, Kramer was returned to Air21 alongside Rich Alvarez for Yancy de Ocampo and a draft pick.

Kramer set a career high in rebounding twice while still with Air21 on his last 2 of 3 games with them. He had 16 points and 17 rebounds in 23 minutes against his former team, Ginebra on June 20, 2010. He then had 17 points and 17 rebounds in 33 minutes against the Rain or Shine Elasto Painters on July 4, 2010.

=== Rain or Shine Elasto Painters ===
Before the 2010 PBA draft, the Rain or Shine Elasto Painters traded for Kramer by sending Marcy Arellano to Air21.

He set his career high in points on his first game with Rain or Shine on Oct. 6, 2010 with 19 points. He tied that career high with 19 points once again in a win over the San Miguel Beermen.

In his second conference with Rain or Shine, only behind import Hassan Adams, Kramer led his team both in scoring and rebounding among all locals at the end of eliminations of the 2011 Commissioners Cup. He averaged 9.56ppg and 7.67rpg in only 23.33 minutes per game. This would serve as his best conference averages in his PBA career.

=== Powerade Tigers ===
After being traded to the Powerade Tigers, Kramer at his 8th game as a Tiger, finally eclipsed his personal rebounding best of 17, to 20 rebounds against the Talk 'N Text Tropang Texters on Nov. 9, 2011. During the 2011–12 Philippine Cup 14-game eliminations, Kramer registered a career best nine double doubles (which included 6 straight double doubles), with conference highs of 18 points against the Petron Blaze Boosters and career best 20 rebounds against Talk 'N Text. During the whole eliminations, there were only 4 players who averaged double doubles: Santos, Harvey Carey, Jay-R Reyes and Kramer. He averaged a double double during that All-Filipino conference with 11.64 points/game and 10.57 rebounds/game in 30.79 minutes/contest, all of which were career highs in averages. His 9 double doubles is 2nd most for the conference and is only behind Arwind Santos, who registered 11 double doubles. He was also 6th best in the league in 2-point field goal percentage with .516. Kramer was third-best in the league in rebounding with his 10.57 rebounds/game and was 2nd best in total rebounds hauled down with 148. Kramer was the number 3 top scorer for the Tigers and number 1 rebounder for his team during that conference.

Kramer led Powerade all the way to Game 5 of the finals against the eventual champions, Talk 'N Text, which beat them 4–1 in the series. He registered his all-time career best in rebounds during that series, where he hauled down 23 boards during Game 3. He would register a league best 18 double doubles during that conference and would also lead the league in total rebounds hauled down with 303, No. 1 in total offensive rebounds with 101, No. 1 in total defensive rebounds with 202, and would get a league 2nd best average with 10.82 rebounds/game for the 28 games that Powerade played. He also averaged a career best 11.32 points/game, to average a double double throughout the whole 2011–12 Philippine Cup Conference.

During the 2012 Commissioner's Cup, his minutes went down, but he still was able to contribute 5.6 points and 4.1 rebounds.

=== Barako Bull Energy Cola ===
Doug Kramer would eventually get traded on May 4, 2012, to the Barako Bull Energy Cola after playing 2 conferences with Powerade. He would get traded for Jondan Salvador and a second-round pick. With four months left in his PBA contract, Barako signed him with a contract extension of three more years.

Kramer would play his first game as a Barako Bull player on May 25, 2012. He would eventually finish the 2011–12 season on a high note as he would end up having the second-best rebounding average of 8.77 on 48 games played, only behind Arwind Santos' 10.67. He would also end up with 279 total defensive rebounds for 2nd most in the league, 142 total offensive rebounds for 3rd most in league, and 3rd most in total rebounds with 421. He would also average a career best 9.54 points/game and have the 2nd most double doubles for the season with 22. He capped off his career best season with nominations for the Most Improved Player award (his 2nd straight nomination) and Mythical 5 All-Defensive team. He would end up bagging the trophy for being part of the All-Defensive team for the 1st time in his career.

During the 2012–13 Philippine Cup conference 14-game eliminations, Doug was 2nd best in the rebounding average with 10.43 rebounds/game. He would also have an impressive four-game stretch of rebounding for Barako where he averaged 18.5 rebounds.

=== Petron Blaze Boosters / San Miguel Beermen ===
On August 12, 2013, Kramer was officially traded to the Petron Blaze Boosters for Dorian Peña and Petron's 2013 second-round pick.

=== GlobalPort Batang Pier ===
In 2016, Kramer was traded to the GlobalPort Batang Pier for Mick Pennisi.

=== Phoenix Pulse Fuel Masters ===
In October 2016, Kramer suffered a mild stroke, which hospitalized him for several days. It was then revealed that he had a congenital hole in his heart. A minor procedure closed the hole in his heart. He didn't play for four months. On February 4, 2017, Kramer made his return to Phoenix with nine points and a team-high 12 rebounds in a loss to the Star Hotshots.

In his last game in the PBA, Phoenix won over the Blackwater Elite. Kramer had three points, ten rebounds, and three blocks. He retired after that season.

== PBA career statistics ==
Legend
GP	Games played	MPG	Minutes per game
FG%	Field-goal percentage	3P%	3-point field-goal percentage	FT%	Free-throw percentage
RPG	Rebounds per game	APG	Assists per game	SPG	Steals per game
BPG	Blocks per game	PPG	Points per game	**Bold**	Career high

=== Season-by-season averages ===
Year	Team	GP	MPG	FG%	3P%	FT%	RPG	APG	SPG	BPG	PPG
2007–08	Air21	**49**	12.4	.433	.200	.781	3.5	.4	.1	.1	3.7
2008–09	Air21	27	13.0	.453	.200	.654	3.1	.4	.1	**.3**	3.9
2008–09	Barangay Ginebra	27	13.0	.453	.200	.654	3.1	.4	.1	**.3**	3.9
2009–10	Barangay Ginebra	19	12.0	.500	.000	.686	4.3	.2	.1	**.3**	5.1
2009–10	Air21	19	12.0	.500	.000	.686	4.3	.2	.1	**.3**	5.1
2010–11	Rain or Shine	35	20.1	.448	.000	.680	6.7	.5	.1	.2	7.4
2011–12	Powerade	48	**26.6**	.496	.500	.658	**8.8**	**.9**	.2	.2	**9.5**
2012–13	Barako Bull	48	17.4	.419	—	.768	5.9	.4	.2	.1	4.5
2012–13	Petron	48	17.4	.419	—	.768	5.9	.4	.2	.1	4.5
2013–14	Petron / San Miguel	42	16.3	**.527**	—	.609	5.0	.3	.1	.1	5.1
2014–15	San Miguel	40	15.5	.462	**1.000**	.773	4.0	.5	.1	.0	4.9
2014–15	GlobalPort	40	15.5	.462	**1.000**	.773	4.0	.5	.1	.0	4.9
2015–16	GlobalPort	38	17.7	.484	—	.704	6.2	.4	.2	.1	5.0
2016–17	Phoenix	25	15.4	.406	—	.842	4.0	.4	.1	.2	3.9
2017–18	Phoenix	29	15.7	.504	—	**.913**	5.2	.6	**.4**	.0	4.8
2019	Phoenix	37	13.9	.467	.000	.750	4.0	.5	.1	.0	2.8
Career		437	16.8	.468	.250	.710	5.2	.5	.1	.1	5.2

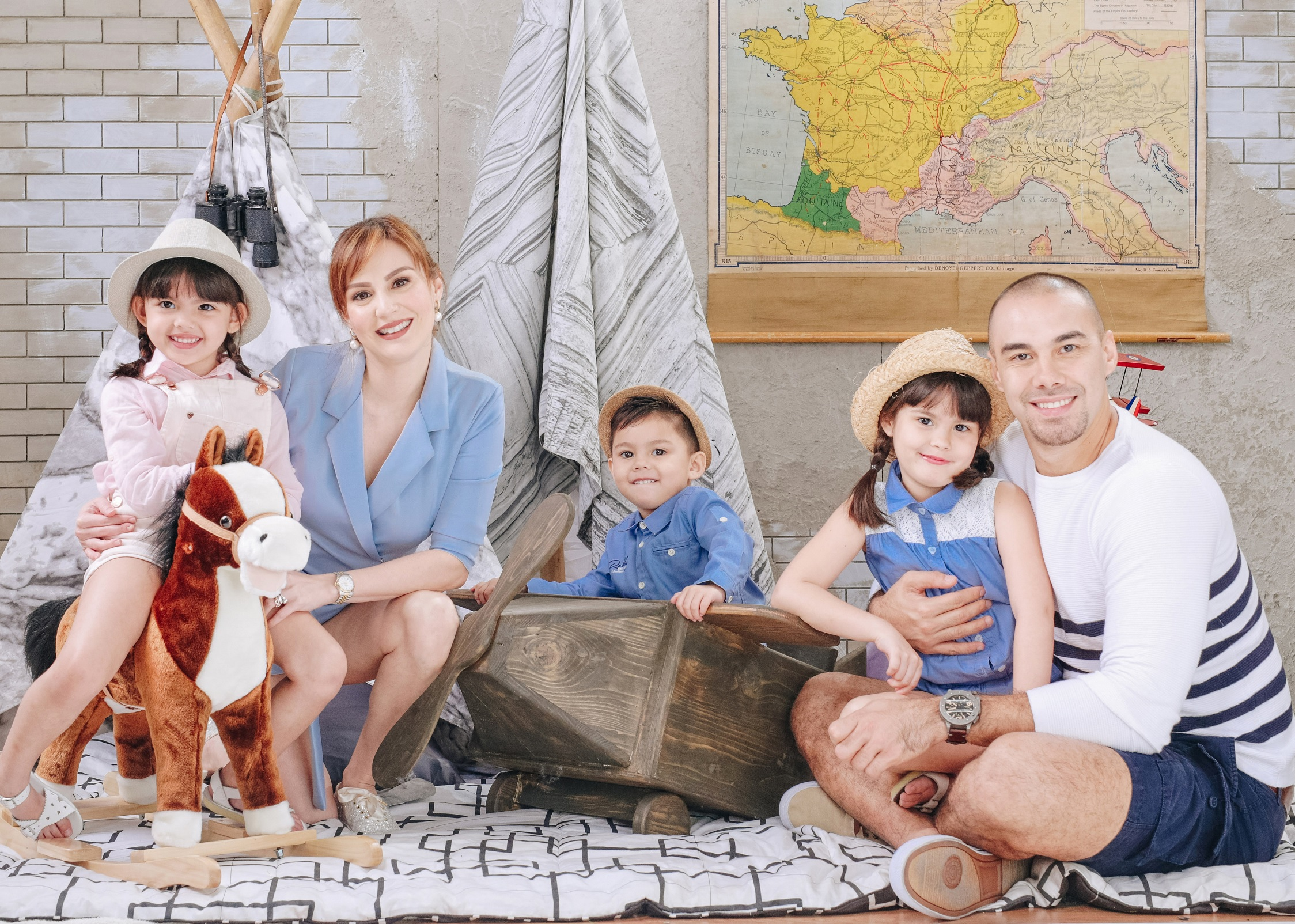
Kramer family

== Personal life ==
On October 9, 2008, Kramer married Filipina actress Cheska Garcia. They have three children together: Clair Kendra, Scarlett Louvelle and Gavin Phoenix. As a family, they are active on social media, posting on their Facebook fan page Team Kramer. They were featured on the magazine cover of the June 2017 issue of Esquire Philippines for Father's Day.

They are the children of John Noel Kramer and Nellie Kramer. Kramer has six siblings: older brothers Lincoln and Mark, who currently live in California, younger sister Stacey who lives in London, and siblings Lauren, Karl Lewis and Brandy, who reside in the Philippines. Arvin Tolentino is married to Brandy Kramer. They have two daughters.

Kramer and his family are Christians. They attend Christ's Commission Fellowship.
