= 2013 PBA Commissioner's Cup finals =

Philippine basketball competition

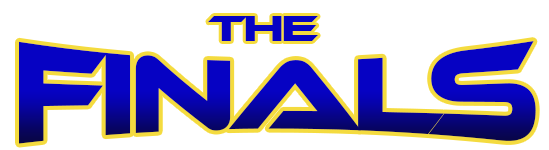
Team	Coach	Wins
(1) Alaska Aces	Luigi Trillo	3
(7) Barangay Ginebra San Miguel	Alfrancis Chua	0
- Dates: May 15–19, 2013
- MVP: Sonny Thoss
- Television: Sports5 on TV5 / AksyonTV
- Announcers: See broadcast notes
- Radio network: DZSR

Referees
- Game 1: P. Balao, J. Marabe, E. Tankion
- Game 2: N. Quilinguen, A. Herrera, E. Aquino
- Game 3: N. Quilinguen, P. Balao, S. Pineda

PBA Commissioner's Cup finals chronology
- < 2012 2014 >

PBA finals chronology
- < 2012–13 Philippine 2013 Governors' >

The 2013 Philippine Basketball Association (PBA) Commissioner's Cup finals, also known as the 2013 Cebuana Lhuillier PBA Commissioner's Cup finals for sponsorship reasons, was the best-of-5 championship series of the 2013 PBA Commissioner's Cup, and the conclusion of the conference's playoffs. The Alaska Aces and the Barangay Ginebra San Miguel competed for the 108th championship contested by the league. Alaska defeated Ginebra by sweeping the series, 3–0, with Alaska winning its first championship (14th overall) after Tim Cone's tenure with the Aces and their final title in the league.

This was the third time the two teams met in the finals, and served as a rematch of the 1997 edition of the Commissioner's Cup, when Barangay Ginebra, then known as the Gordon's Gin Boars defeated Alaska, four games to two.

== Background ==
=== Road to the finals ===
Alaska		Barangay Ginebra San Miguel
Finished 11–3 (0.786):1st	Elimination round	Finished 7–7 (0.500):7th
Def. Air21 in one game (87–81)	Quarterfinals	Def. Rain or Shine in two games (90–83, 81–79)
Def. San Mig Coffee, 3–1	Semifinals	Def. Talk 'N Text, 3–2

=== Head-to-head matchup ===
February 22, 2013

recap

Alaska Aces 84, Barangay Ginebra San Miguel 69

Mindanao Convention Center, Tubod, Lanao del Norte

April 10, 2013

recap

Alaska Aces 102, Barangay Ginebra San Miguel 93

Smart Araneta Coliseum, Quezon City

== Series summary ==
Team	Game 1	Game 2	Game 3	Wins
Alaska	87	104	104	3
Ginebra	70	90	80	0
Venue	Araneta	MOA	Araneta

=== Game 1 ===
Sports5 on TV5
AksyonTV

May 15
7:30 p.m.

Box Score

Alaska Aces 87, Barangay Ginebra San Miguel 70
Scoring by quarter: 28–6, 18–18, 21–24, 20–22
Pts: Jazul 16; Rebs: Dozier 22; Asts: Baguio, Casio 5	Pts: Macklin 16; Rebs: Macklin 14; Asts: Helterbrand 5
Alaska leads series, 1–0

Smart Araneta Coliseum, Quezon City
Attendance: 19,678
Referees: P. Balao, J. Marabe, E. Tankion

=== Game 2 ===
Sports5 on TV5
AksyonTV

May 17
7:30 p.m.

Alaska Aces 104, Barangay Ginebra San Miguel 90
Scoring by quarter: 25–23, 29–14, 20–19, 30–34
Pts: Thoss 16; Rebs: Dozier 20; Asts: Casio 8	Pts: Helterbrand 17; Rebs: Macklin 13; Asts: Tenorio 9
Alaska leads series, 2–0

Mall of Asia Arena, Pasay
Attendance: 17,856
Referees: N. Quilinguen, A. Herrera, E. Aquino

=== Game 3 ===
Sports5 on TV5
AksyonTV

May 19
7:30 p.m.

Alaska Aces 104, Barangay Ginebra San Miguel 80
Scoring by quarter: 23–20, 21–28, 27–24, 33–8
Pts: Dozier 27; Rebs: Thoss 12; Asts: Casio 9	Pts: Tenorio 18; Rebs: Macklin 15; Asts: Tenorio, Labagala 7
Alaska wins series, 3–0

Smart Araneta Coliseum, Quezon City
Attendance: 23,436
Referees: N. Quilinguen, P. Balao, S. Pineda

== Rosters ==
Alaska Aces roster
Players
Coaches

Pos.	#	POB	Name	Height	Weight	DOB (YYYY–MM–DD)	From
F	0	(United States)	Nic Belasco	6 ft 6 in (1.98 m)	210 lb (95 kg)		Notre Dame (MD)
C	1	(Philippines)	Samigue Eman	6 ft 9 in (2.06 m)	239 lb (108 kg)		Mindanao
F	2	(United States)	Robert Dozier (I)	6 ft 9 in (2.06 m)	215 lb (98 kg)		Memphis
G/F	3	(Philippines)	Cyrus Baguio	6 ft 2 in (1.88 m)	180 lb (82 kg)		UST
G	4	(Philippines)	Raphy Reyes (R)	5 ft 10 in (1.78 m)	145 lb (66 kg)		UE
C	7	(Papua New Guinea)	Sonny Thoss	6 ft 7 in (2.01 m)	205 lb (93 kg)		James Cook
G/F	8	(Philippines)	Calvin Abueva (R)	6 ft 3 in (1.91 m)	190 lb (86 kg)		San Sebastian
F/C	17	(Philippines)	Aldrech Ramos (R)	6 ft 7 in (2.01 m)	198 lb (90 kg)		Far Eastern
F/C	21	(Philippines)	Paolo Bugia	6 ft 6 in (1.98 m)	215 lb (98 kg)		Ateneo
G	25	(Philippines)	Dondon Hontiveros	6 ft 2 in (1.88 m)	170 lb (77 kg)		Cebu
F	27	(Philippines)	Gabby Espinas	6 ft 4 in (1.93 m)	194 lb (88 kg)		Philippine Christian
G	31	(Philippines)	RJ Jazul	5 ft 10 in (1.78 m)	170 lb (77 kg)		Letran
G/F	35	(United States)	Tony dela Cruz (C)	6 ft 4 in (1.93 m)	178 lb (81 kg)		UC Irvine
G	42	(Philippines)	JV Casio	5 ft 9 in (1.75 m)	170 lb (77 kg)		De La Salle
F	65	(Philippines)	Eddie Laure	6 ft 4 in (1.93 m)	195 lb (88 kg)		Adamson

Head coach

- (Philippines) Luigi Trillo (De La Salle)

Assistant coach(es)

- (United States) Alex Compton (Cornell)
- (Philippines) Louie Alas (Adamson)
- (Philippines) Topex Robinson (San Sebastian)

Team manager

- (Philippines) Joaqui Trillo (De La Salle)

Legend

- (C) Team captain
- (CI) Commissioner's Cup Import
- (GI) Governors' Cup Import
- (EI) EASL Import
- (DP) Unsigned draft pick
- (FA) Free agent
- (IN) Inactive
- (S) Suspended
- (R) Rookie
- Injured

Barangay Ginebra San Miguel roster
Players
Coaches

Pos.	#	POB	Name	Height	Weight	DOB (YYYY–MM–DD)	From
C	2	(Philippines)	Billy Mamaril	6 ft 6 in (1.98 m)	225 lb (102 kg)		Bakersfield
PG	3	(United States)	Josh Urbiztondo	6 ft 1 in (1.85 m)	185 lb (84 kg)		Fresno Pacific
F/C	4	(Kuwait)	Yousef Taha (R)	6 ft 7 in (2.01 m)	245 lb (111 kg)		Mapúa
PG	5	(Philippines)	LA Tenorio	5 ft 7 in (1.70 m)	155 lb (70 kg)		Ateneo
PG	9	(Philippines)	Rob Labagala	5 ft 9 in (1.75 m)	170 lb (77 kg)		UE
F	10	(Philippines)	Rico Maierhofer	6 ft 5 in (1.96 m)	180 lb (82 kg)		De La Salle
G	13	(Philippines)	Jayjay Helterbrand (C)	5 ft 11 in (1.80 m)	170 lb (77 kg)		Kentucky State
F/C	21	(Philippines)	Kerby Raymundo	6 ft 6 in (1.98 m)	215 lb (98 kg)		Letran
F/C	22	(United States)	Vernon Macklin (I)	6 ft 10 in (2.08 m)	227 lb (103 kg)		Florida
F	23	(Philippines)	Elmer Espiritu	6 ft 3 in (1.91 m)	200 lb (91 kg)		UE
F	27	(United States)	Willy Wilson	6 ft 3 in (1.91 m)	200 lb (91 kg)		De La Salle
F	33	(Philippines)	Dylan Ababou (injured)	6 ft 3 in (1.91 m)	185 lb (84 kg)		UST
F	34	(United States)	Chris Ellis (R)	6 ft 5 in (1.96 m)	185 lb (84 kg)		Mary Hardin–Baylor
G/F	45	(Philippines)	Mac Baracael	6 ft 2 in (1.88 m)	190 lb (86 kg)		Far Eastern
SG	47	(Philippines)	Mark Caguioa	6 ft 0 in (1.83 m)	190 lb (86 kg)		Glendale CC (CA)
PF	99	(United States)	Rudy Hatfield	6 ft 3 in (1.91 m)	205 lb (93 kg)		UM–Dearborn

Head coach

- (Philippines) Alfrancis Chua (UST)

Assistant coach(es)

- (Philippines) Siot Tanquingcen (UST)
- (Philippines) Allan Caidic (UE)
- (Philippines) Marco Januz Sauler (De La Salle)
- (Philippines) Art dela Cruz (San Sebastian)
- (Philippines) Freddie Abuda (Cebu)

Team manager

- (Philippines) Samboy Lim (Letran)

Legend

- (C) Team captain
- (CI) Commissioner's Cup Import
- (GI) Governors' Cup Import
- (EI) EASL Import
- (DP) Unsigned draft pick
- (FA) Free agent
- (IN) Inactive
- (S) Suspended
- (R) Rookie
- Injured

Note: Flags indicate national team eligibility at FIBA-sanctioned events. Players may hold other non-FIBA nationalities not displayed.

== Broadcast notes ==
Game	Play-by-play	Analyst	Courtside reporter
Game 1	Mico Halili	Jason Webb and Benjie Paras	Erika Padilla
Game 2	Magoo Marjon	Quinito Henson and Ronnie Magsanoc	Sel Guevara
Game 3	Mico Halili	Jason Webb and Richard del Rosario	Jessica Mendoza

- Additional Game 3 crew:
  - Trophy presentation: Dominic Uy
  - Dugout celebration interviewer: Erika Padilla
