= 2012–13 PBA Philippine Cup =

First conference of the 2012–13 PBA season

- Duration: September 30, 2012 – January 16, 2013
- TV partner(s): Sports5 - AKTV on IBC (Local); Aksyon TV International (International)

Finals
- Champions: Talk 'N Text Tropang Texters
- Runners-up: Rain or Shine Elasto Painters

Awards
- Best Player: Jayson Castro (Talk 'N Text Tropang Texters)
- Finals MVP: Ranidel de Ocampo (Talk 'N Text Tropang Texters)

PBA Philippine Cup chronology
- < 2011–12 2013–14 >

PBA conference chronology
- < 2012 Governors' 2013 Commissioner's >

The 2012–13 Philippine Basketball Association (PBA) Philippine Cup was the first conference of the 2012–13 PBA season. The tournament started on September 30, 2012, and concluded on January 16, 2013. The tournament does not allow teams to hire foreign players or imports.

== Format ==
The following format was observed for the duration of the tournament:

- Two-round eliminations, with each team playing 14 games. The teams are divided into two groups on the basis of their natural draft order from the previous rookie draft. Each team will play teams within their group once, while they will play teams from the other group twice.
  - Group A:
    - Air21 Express (#1)
    - Meralco Bolts (#3)
    - Petron Blaze Boosters (#5)
    - Barangay Ginebra San Miguel (#7)
    - San Mig Coffee Mixers (#9)
  - Group B:
    - Alaska Aces (#2)
    - Barako Bull Energy Cola (#4)
    - GlobalPort Batang Pier (#6)
    - Rain or Shine Elasto Painters (#8)
    - Talk 'N Text Tropang Texters (#10)
- Top eight teams will advance to the quarterfinals. In case of tie, playoffs will be held only for the #2 and #8 seeds.
- Quarterfinals:
  - QF1: #1 seed vs #8 seed (#1 seed twice-to-beat)
  - QF2: #2 seed vs #7 seed (#2 seed twice-to-beat)
  - QF3: #3 seed vs #6 seed (best-of-3 series)
  - QF4: #4 seed vs #5 seed (best-of-3 series)
- Semifinals (best-of-7 series):
  - SF1: QF1 vs. QF4 winners
  - SF2: QF2 vs. QF3 winners
- Finals (best-of-7 series)
  - Winners of the semifinals

== Elimination round ==
=== Team standings ===
Pos	Team	W	L	PCT	GB	Qualification
1	Talk 'N Text Tropang Texters	12	2	.857	—	Twice-to-beat in the quarterfinals
2	San Mig Coffee Mixers	10	4	.714	2	Twice-to-beat in the quarterfinals
3	Rain or Shine Elasto Painters	9	5	.643	3	Best-of-three quarterfinals
4	Meralco Bolts	8	6	.571 (Note: Head-to-head record: Alaska 1–1 Meralco (Meralco +4))	4	Best-of-three quarterfinals
5	Alaska Aces	8	6	.571	4	Best-of-three quarterfinals
6	Barangay Ginebra San Miguel	7	7	.500	5	Best-of-three quarterfinals
7	Petron Blaze Boosters	6	8	.429	6	Twice-to-win in the quarterfinals
8	Air21 Express	5	9	.357	7	Twice-to-win in the quarterfinals
9	Barako Bull Energy Cola	4	10	.286	8	
10	GlobalPort Batang Pier	1	13	.071	11	

Source: PBA.ph

=== Results ===
Team	A21	ALA	BBE	BGSM	GP	MER	PBB	ROS	SMC	TNT
Air21		81–92	87–90	76–99	88–81	72–85	97–76	98–99*	80–89	89–96
Alaska	103–104		102–86	87–69	101–95	86–93	88–86	93–101	83–103	94–92
Barako Bull	85–86	—		92–82	95–94	86–99	89–98	101–116	91–92	76–79
Barangay Ginebra	—	96–93	79–83		110–90	88–95	95–98	98–94	68–78	104–101
GlobalPort	92–113	—	—	79–81		105–104	98–110	83–94	78–82	104–108
Meralco	—	85–88	85–73	—	101–92		95–81	81–106	87–77	110–112*
Petron Blaze	—	71–79	93–83	—	110–81	—		86–102	84–90	82–92
Rain or Shine	71–62	—	—	90–97	—	102–98*	86–96		80–79	77–80
San Mig Coffee	—	77–68	93–73	78–68	107–96	—	—	93–92		74–85
Talk 'N Text	100–94	—	—	87–80	—	109–98	95–82	—	92–63	

Legend: Blue = left column team win; Red = top row team win.
Matches with lighter background shading were decided after overtime.

== Bracket ==
Quarterfinals
(#1 twice-to-beat)
1	Talk 'N Text	105
8	Air21	100
(Best-of-3)
4	Meralco	0
5	Alaska	2
(#2 twice-to-beat)
2	San Mig Coffee	92*
7	Petron Blaze	87
(Best-of-3)
3	Rain or Shine	2
6	Barangay Ginebra	1

Semifinals (Best-of-7)
1	Talk 'N Text	4
5	Alaska	2
2	San Mig Coffee	2
3	Rain or Shine	4

Finals (Best-of-7)
1	Talk 'N Text	4
3	Rain or Shine	0

*Game went into overtime

== Quarterfinals ==
=== (1) Talk 'N Text vs. (8) Air21 ===
December 13

Talk 'N Text Tropang Texters 105, Air21 Express 100
Talk 'N Text wins series in one game

Smart Araneta Coliseum, Quezon City

=== (2) San Mig Coffee vs. (7) Petron Blaze ===
December 13

San Mig Coffee Mixers 92, Petron Blaze Boosters 87 (OT)
San Mig Coffee wins series in one game

Smart Araneta Coliseum, Quezon City

=== (3) Rain or Shine vs. (6) Barangay Ginebra ===
December 12

Rain or Shine Elasto Painters 82, Barangay Ginebra San Miguel 65

Smart Araneta Coliseum, Quezon City

December 14

Rain or Shine Elasto Painters 77, Barangay Ginebra San Miguel 79

Smart Araneta Coliseum, Quezon City

December 16

Rain or Shine Elasto Painters 102, Barangay Ginebra San Miguel 89
Rain or Shine wins series, 2–1

Smart Araneta Coliseum, Quezon City

=== (4) Meralco vs. (5) Alaska ===
December 12

Meralco Bolts 84, Alaska Aces 90

Smart Araneta Coliseum, Quezon City

December 14

Meralco Bolts 70, Alaska Aces 88
Alaska wins series, 2–0

Smart Araneta Coliseum, Quezon City

== Semifinals ==
=== (1) Talk 'N Text vs. (5) Alaska ===
December 19

Talk 'N Text Tropang Texters 66, Alaska Aces 65

Smart Araneta Coliseum, Quezon City

December 21

Talk 'N Text Tropang Texters 88, Alaska Aces 100

Mall of Asia Arena, Pasay

December 26

Talk 'N Text Tropang Texters 93, Alaska Aces 79

Mall of Asia Arena, Pasay

December 28

Talk 'N Text Tropang Texters 99, Alaska Aces 104

Mall of Asia Arena, Pasay

December 30

Talk 'N Text Tropang Texters 99, Alaska Aces 95

Mall of Asia Arena, Pasay

January 4

Talk 'N Text Tropang Texters 83, Alaska Aces 78
Talk 'N Text wins series, 4–2

Cuneta Astrodome, Pasay

=== (2) San Mig Coffee vs. (3) Rain or Shine ===
December 19

San Mig Coffee Mixers 83, Rain or Shine Elasto Painters 91

Smart Araneta Coliseum, Quezon City

December 21

San Mig Coffee Mixers 106, Rain or Shine Elasto Painters 82

Mall of Asia Arena, Pasay

December 25

San Mig Coffee Mixers 72, Rain or Shine Elasto Painters 98

Mall of Asia Arena, Pasay

December 27

San Mig Coffee Mixers 74, Rain or Shine Elasto Painters 83

Mall of Asia Arena, Pasay

December 29

San Mig Coffee Mixers 79, Rain or Shine Elasto Painters 67

Mall of Asia Arena, Pasay

January 3

San Mig Coffee Mixers 83, Rain or Shine Elasto Painters 90
Rain or Shine wins series, 4–2

Mall of Asia Arena, Pasay

== Finals ==
January 9

Talk 'N Text Tropang Texters 87, Rain or Shine Elasto Painters 81

Smart Araneta Coliseum, Quezon City

January 11

Talk 'N Text Tropang Texters 89, Rain or Shine Elasto Painters 81

Mall of Asia Arena, Pasay

January 13

Talk 'N Text Tropang Texters 89, Rain or Shine Elasto Painters 80

Smart Araneta Coliseum, Quezon City

January 16

Talk 'N Text Tropang Texters 105, Rain or Shine Elasto Painters 82
Talk 'N Text wins series, 4-0

Smart Araneta Coliseum, Quezon City

== Conference records ==
Records marked with an asterisk (*) were accomplished with one or more overtime periods.

=== Team ===
Record	Stat	Holder	Date/s
Longest winning streak	8	Talk 'N Text Tropang Texters	Nov 16 to December 19, 2012
Longest losing streak	10	GlobalPort Batang Pier	Oct 20 to December 7, 2012
Most points in one game (winning team)	116	Rain or Shine Elasto Painters (vs Barako Bull Energy Cola)	December 7, 2012
Most points in one game (losing team)	110*	Meralco Bolts (vs Talk 'N Text Tropang Texters)	October 5, 2012
Most points in one game (combined)	222*	Meralco Bolts vs Talk 'N Text Tropang Texters	October 5, 2012
Most points in one half	68	San Mig Coffee Mixers (vs Rain or Shine Elasto Painters)	December 21, 2012
Most points in one quarter	39	Rain or Shine Elasto Painters (vs Meralco Bolts)	November 4, 2012
Most points in one quarter	39	Meralco Bolts (vs GlobalPort Batang Pier)	October 17, 2012
Least points in one game (winning team)	66	Talk 'N Text Tropang Texters (vs Alaska Aces)	December 19, 2012
Least points in one game (losing team)	62	Air21 Express (vs Rain or Shine Elasto Painters)	November 17, 2012
Least points in one game (combined)	131	Talk 'N Text Tropang Texters vs Alaska Aces	December 19, 2012
Least points in one quarter	6	Petron Blaze Boosters (vs Alaska Aces)	December 5, 2012
Least points in one half	22	San Mig Coffee Mixers (vs Alaska Aces)	November 10, 2012
Biggest winning margin	29	Petron Blaze Boosters (vs GlobalPort Batang Pier)	November 18, 2012
Biggest winning margin	29	Talk 'N Text Tropang Texters (vs San Mig Coffee Mixers)	November 21, 2012

=== Individual ===
Record	Stat	Holder	Date/s
Most points in one game	41	Niño Canaleta (Air21 Express vs GlobalPort Batang Pier)	December 5, 2012
Most rebounds in one game	21	Doug Kramer (Barako Bull Energy Cola vs Petron Blaze Boosters)	November 24, 2012
Most rebounds in one game	21	Jay-R Reyes (Meralco Bolts vs Alaska Aces)	December 12, 2012
Most defensive rebounds in one game	15	Jay-R Reyes (Meralco Bolts vs Alaska Aces)	December 12, 2012
Most offensive rebounds in one game	12	Doug Kramer (Barako Bull Energy Cola vs Petron Blaze Boosters)	November 24, 2012
Most assists in one game	18	Mike Cortez (Air21 Express vs Talk 'N Text Tropang Texters)	December 13, 2012
Most blocks in one game	6	Billy Mamaril (Barangay Ginebra San Miguel vs Rain or Shine Elasto Painters)	December 16, 2012
Most steals in one game	6	Chris Ross (Meralco Bolts vs Petron Blaze Boosters)	November 11, 2012
Most FG made in one game	14	Niño Canaleta (Air21 Express vs GlobalPort Batang Pier)	December 5, 2012
Most 3 point FG made in one game	7	Ronjay Buenafe (Meralco Bolts vs GlobalPort Batang Pier)	October 17, 2012
Most 3 point FG made in one game	7	James Yap (San Mig Coffee Mixers vs Rain or Shine Elasto Painters)	December 21, 2012
Most FT made in one game	15	Jeffrei Chan (Rain or Shine Elasto Painters vs Meralco Bolts)	November 21, 2012
Most FT made in one game	15	JVee Casio (Alaska Aces vs GlobalPort Batang Pier)	December 1, 2012
Most minutes played in one game	47	James Yap (San Mig Coffee Mixers vs Petron Blaze Boosters)	December 13, 2012

== Awards ==
=== Conference ===
- Best Player of the Conference: Jayson Castro (Talk 'N Text Tropang Texters)
- Finals MVP: Ranidel de Ocampo (Talk 'N Text Tropang Texters)

=== Players of the Week ===
Week	Player	Ref.
September 30 – October 7	LA Tenorio (Barangay Ginebra San Miguel)	
October 8–14	Cliff Hodge (Meralco Bolts)	
October 15–21	Jervy Cruz (Rain or Shine Elasto Painters)	
October 22–28	Calvin Abueva (Alaska Aces)	
October 29 – November 4	JVee Casio (Alaska Aces)	
November 5–11	Mark Caguioa (Barangay Ginebra San Miguel)	
November 12–18	Mark Caguioa (Barangay Ginebra San Miguel)	
November 19–25	Jimmy Alapag (Talk 'N Text Tropang Texters)	
November 26 – December 2	Calvin Abueva (Alaska Aces)	
December 3–9	Jervy Cruz (Rain or Shine Elasto Painters)	
December 10–16	Paul Lee (Rain or Shine Elasto Painters)	
December 17–23	James Yap (San Mig Coffee Mixers)	
December 24–30	Ryan Araña (Rain or Shine Elasto Painters)	
December 31 – January 6	Jeffrei Chan (Rain or Shine Elasto Painters)	
