= 2012–13 PBA season =

38th PBA season

- Duration: September 30, 2012 – October 25, 2013
- Teams: 10
- TV partner(s): AKTV/Sports5 on IBC/AksyonTV (Note: The Finals series of the Commissioner's Cup and the Governors' Cup were aired on TV5.); AksyonTV International (International)

2012 PBA Draft
- Top draft pick: June Mar Fajardo
- Picked by: Petron Blaze Boosters
- Season MVP: Arwind Santos (Petron Blaze Boosters)
- Top scorer: Gary David (GlobalPort Batang Pier)
- Philippine Cup champions: Talk 'N Text Tropang Texters
- Philippine Cup runners-up: Rain or Shine Elasto Painters
- Commissioner's Cup champions: Alaska Aces
- Commissioner's Cup runners-up: Barangay Ginebra San Miguel
- Governors' Cup champions: San Mig Coffee Mixers
- Governors' Cup runners-up: Petron Blaze Boosters

Seasons
- ← 2011–12 2013–14 →

The 2012–13 PBA season was the 38th season of the Philippine Basketball Association. The season formally opened on September 30, 2012, and finished October 25, 2013. This was the longest in PBA history with 13-month span. The season continued to use the three-conference format, starting with the Philippine Cup, or the traditional All-Filipino Conference. The mid season Commissioner's Cup will continue to feature unlimited height limit for imports. The last conference of the season, the Governors' Cup will have imports with a 6'5" height limit.

The first activity of the season was the 2012 PBA Draft held on August 19, 2012, at Robinsons Midtown Mall in Ermita, Manila.

== Board of governors ==
=== Executive committee ===
- Chito Salud (Commissioner)
- Robert Non (Chairman, representing Barangay Ginebra San Miguel)
- Ramon Segismundo (Vice-Chairman, representing Meralco Bolts)
- Eliezer Capacio (Treasurer, representing Petron Blaze Boosters)

== Teams ==
Team	Company	Governor	Alternate Governor
Air21 Express	Airfrieght 2100, Inc.	Angelito Alvarez	Jerry Jara
Alaska Aces	Alaska Milk Corporation	Joaquin Trillo	Richard Bachmann
Barako Bull Energy	Energy Food and Drinks Inc.	Manuel Alvarez	
Barangay Ginebra San Miguel	Ginebra San Miguel, Inc.	Robert Non	
GlobalPort Batang Pier	Sultan 900 Capital, Inc.	Michael Romero	Nathaniel Romero / Erick Arejola
Meralco Bolts	Manila Electric Company	Ramon Segismundo	Al Panlilio / Betty Siy-Yap
Petron Blaze Boosters	Petron Corporation	Roberto Huang	Eliezer Capacio
Rain or Shine Elasto Painters	Asian Coatings Philippines, Inc.	Mamerto Mondragon	Edison Orbania
San Mig Coffee Mixers	San Miguel Pure Foods Company, Inc.	Rene Pardo	
Talk 'N Text Tropang Texters	Smart Communications	Manuel V. Pangilinan	Patrick Gregorio / Victorino Vargas

== Arenas ==
Metro Manila venues of the PBA.
Provincial venues of the PBA that hosted one game day (red), and two or more game days (blue).

Like several Metro Manila-centric leagues, most games are held at arenas within Metro Manila, and sometimes, Antipolo. Games outside this area are called "out-of-town" games, and are usually played on Saturdays. Provincial arenas usually host one game, rarely two; these arenas typically host only once per season, but could return occasionally.

=== Main arenas ===
Arena	City
Cuneta Astrodome	Pasay
Mall of Asia Arena	Pasay
Smart Araneta Coliseum	Quezon City
Ynares Center	Antipolo, Rizal
PhilSports Arena	Pasig

=== Out-of-town arenas ===
Arena	City	Date	Match-up
Sports Cultural and Business Center of Davao del Sur	Digos, Davao del Sur	October 13, 2012	Meralco vs. Barangay Ginebra
Victorias City Sports and Amusement Center	Victorias, Negros Occidental	October 27, 2012	Talk 'N Text vs. Rain or Shine
Hoops Dome	Lapu-Lapu City	November 10, 2012	Alaska vs. San Mig
Mindanao Civic Center Gymnasium	Tubod, Lanao del Norte	November 17, 2012	Rain or Shine vs. Air21
Mindanao Civic Center Gymnasium	Tubod, Lanao del Norte	February 23, 2013	Barangay Ginebra vs. Alaska
Quezon Convention Center	Lucena	November 24, 2012	Petron vs. Barako Bull
Dipolog City Sports Complex	Dipolog, Zamboanga del Norte	December 1, 2012	Alaska vs. GlobalPort
Puerto Princesa City Coliseum	Puerto Princesa	February 16, 2013	Rain or Shine vs. Meralco
Jesse M. Robredo Coliseum	Naga	March 2, 2013	GlobalPort vs. San Mig
Ibalong Centrum for Recreation	Legazpi, Albay	March 9, 2013	Talk 'N Text vs. Barako Bull
Panabo Multi-Purpose Tourism, Cultural, and Sports Center	Panabo, Davao del Norte	March 16, 2013	Petron vs. Rain or Shine

== Pre-season events ==
=== Player movement ===
Key transactions:

- Air21 Express, Petron Blaze Boosters and Barangay Ginebra San Miguel were involved in a three-way trade. Air21 acquired Nonoy Baclao and Robert Reyes from Petron Blaze and KG Canaleta and John Wilson from Ginebra. Petron Blaze received Paolo Hubalde, Magi Sison from Air21 and Air21's 2014 second round pick. Barangay Ginebra acquired Elmer Espiritu from Air21 and the team's 2013 first round pick.
- Alaska, Barako Bull, Barangay Ginebra, GlobalPort and Petron Blaze were involved in a five-team trade that sent LA Tenorio to Barangay Ginebra, JV Casio and Dondon Hontiveros to Alaska, Willie Miller to GlobalPort, Hans Thiele and Wesley Gonzales to Petron Blaze and Enrico Villanueva to Barako Bull.

=== Notable occurrences ===
- Mikee Romero of Sultan 900 Capital, Inc. is expected to file for an application for a PBA franchise and will debut this season. The new team will carry the name "GlobalPort", one of Romero's business entities.
- Coca-Cola Bottlers Philippines, Inc., owner of the Powerade Tigers sent a letter to the PBA Commissioner's Office informing that the franchise will be sold to Sultan 900 Capital, Inc., owned by businessman Mikee Romero for PHP 100 million, with additional PHP 10 million for franchise application fee payable to the PBA. Under league rules, the sale will need to get an approval of two-thirds vote by the board of governors to push through. The Board of Governors unanimously approved the purchase on a special board meeting on August 17. The team is now known as the GlobalPort Batang Pier.
- The post eliminations format for this season's Governors' Cup will be changed. Instead of the round robin format that was used for the last two seasons, the conference will adapt a quarterfinal-semifinals playoff format.
- Ginebra San Miguel, Inc. announced that they will rechristen the Barangay Ginebra Kings as the Barangay Ginebra San Miguel. The team will adopt a logo with similarities to the Ginebra San Miguel logo used from 1985 to 1988.
- San Miguel-Purefoods Company, Inc. announced that they will rename the B-Meg Llamados as the San Mig Coffee Mixers.
- Energy Food & Drinks, Inc., owners of the Barako Bull Energy franchise announced that they will rename their team as the Barako Bull Energy Cola starting this season.
- The Meralco Bolts will wear their retro 1971 MICAA Meralco Reddy Kilowatts uniform for this season.

=== Coaching changes ===
- Chot Reyes of the Talk 'N Text Tropang Texters stepped down as head coach at the end of the 2011-12 season due to his appointment as head coach of Smart Gilas. Team consultant Norman Black has been appointed as head coach starting this season.
- After the approval of the sale of the Powerade franchise to GlobalPort, coach Bo Perasol requested to be released from his live contract. Glenn Capacio has been appointed as interim coach for GlobalPort.
- On August 22, Ato Agustin was relieved as the head coach of the Petron Blaze Boosters and promoted assistant coach Olsen Racela to head coach. Team consultant Rajko Toroman was assigned as assistant coach.

== Opening ceremonies ==
The season began on September 30, with Barangay Ginebra San Miguel defeating GlobalPort Batang Pier, 110-90.

The muses for the participating teams are as follows:

Team	Muse
Air21 Express	Stephany Stefanowitz
Alaska Aces	Rizzini Alexis Gomez
Barako Bull Energy Cola	Ciane Simones Xavier
Barangay Ginebra San Miguel	Georgina Wilson
GlobalPort Batang Pier	Sam Pinto
Meralco Bolts	Sophie Albert with Artista Academy female finalists
Petron Blaze Boosters	Isabelle Daza
Rain or Shine Elasto Painters	Camille Guevarra
San Mig Coffee Mixers	Anne Curtis
Talk 'N Text Tropang Texters	Alice Dixson

== 2012–13 Philippine Cup ==
=== Notable events ===
- On November 14, Bong Ramos replaced Junel Baculi as the new head coach for the Barako Bull Energy Cola.
- On January 1, Alfrancis Chua was assigned as head coach of Barangay Ginebra San Miguel, while Siot Tanquingcen slides down as lead assistant coach.
- On January 3, Junel Baculi was appointed as head coach of GlobalPort Batang Pier. Glenn Capacio slid down as assistant coach.

=== Elimination round ===
Pos	Team	W	L	PCT	GB	Qualification
1	Talk 'N Text Tropang Texters	12	2	.857	—	Twice-to-beat in the quarterfinals
2	San Mig Coffee Mixers	10	4	.714	2	Twice-to-beat in the quarterfinals
3	Rain or Shine Elasto Painters	9	5	.643	3	Best-of-three quarterfinals
4	Meralco Bolts	8	6	.571 (Note: Head-to-head record: Alaska 1–1 Meralco (Meralco +4))	4	Best-of-three quarterfinals
5	Alaska Aces	8	6	.571	4	Best-of-three quarterfinals
6	Barangay Ginebra San Miguel	7	7	.500	5	Best-of-three quarterfinals
7	Petron Blaze Boosters	6	8	.429	6	Twice-to-win in the quarterfinals
8	Air21 Express	5	9	.357	7	Twice-to-win in the quarterfinals
9	Barako Bull Energy Cola	4	10	.286	8	
10	GlobalPort Batang Pier	1	13	.071	11	

Source: PBA.ph

=== Playoffs ===
Quarterfinals
(#1 twice-to-beat)
1	Talk 'N Text	105
8	Air21	100
(Best-of-3)
4	Meralco	0
5	Alaska	2
(#2 twice-to-beat)
2	San Mig Coffee	92*
7	Petron Blaze	87
(Best-of-3)
3	Rain or Shine	2
6	Barangay Ginebra	1

Semifinals (Best-of-7)
1	Talk 'N Text	4
5	Alaska	2
2	San Mig Coffee	2
3	Rain or Shine	4

Finals (Best-of-7)
1	Talk 'N Text	4
3	Rain or Shine	0

*Game went into overtime

==== Quarterfinals ====
Team 1	Series	Team 2	Game 1	Game 2
(1) Talk 'N Text Tropang Texters*	1–0	(8) Air21 Express	105–100	—
(2) San Mig Coffee Mixers*	1–0	(7) Petron Blaze Boosters	92–87 (OT)	—

Team 1	Series	Team 2	Game 1	Game 2	Game 3
(3) Rain or Shine Elasto Painters	2–1	(4) Barangay Ginebra San Miguel	82–65	77–79	102–89
(4) Meralco Bolts	0–2	(5) Alaska Aces	84–90	70–88	—

*Team has twice-to-beat advantage. Team #1 only has to win once, while Team #2 has to win twice.

==== Semifinals ====
Team 1	Series	Team 2	Game 1	Game 2	Game 3	Game 4	Game 5	Game 6	Game 7
(1) Talk 'N Text Tropang Texters	4–2	(5) Alaska Aces	66–65	88–100	93–79	99–104	99–95	83–78	—
(2) San Mig Coffee Mixers	2–4	(3) Rain or Shine Elasto Painters	83–91	106–82	72–98	74–83	79–67	83–90	—

==== Finals ====
Team 1	Series	Team 2	Game 1	Game 2	Game 3	Game 4	Game 5	Game 6	Game 7
(1) Talk 'N Text Tropang Texters	4–0	(3) Rain or Shine Elasto Painters	87–81	89–81	89–80	105–82	—	—	—

- Finals MVP: Ranidel de Ocampo (Talk 'N Text)
- Best Player of the Conference: Jayson Castro (Talk 'N Text)

== 2013 Commissioner's Cup ==
=== Notable events ===
- To accommodate the training of the Philippines men's national basketball team for the upcoming FIBA Asia Championship, the league's board of governors decided to move the season-ending Governors' Cup until August. The Commissioner's Cup will be extended until the last week of May and will adapt the tournament format of the Philippine Cup, with a shorter playoff series for the semifinal and final round. The changes in the league calendar was formally approved on February 7, during the board of governors' special meeting.
- The format of the upcoming All-Star Game will be modified to feature the Philippines men's national basketball team. Instead of last year's Rookies-Sophomores-Juniors (RSJ) vs. Veterans format, the national team will go up against a selection of PBA players, a similar format used during the 2009 edition of the all-star game.
- On March 8, 2013, in a game against the Alaska Aces for a battle to earn the top spot, Renaldo Balkman of the Petron Blaze Boosters had a major outburst when he claimed he was fouled after shooting an air ball inside the paint. Balkman argued with the referees, but when his argument was ignored, he shoved referees and pushed coaches and teammates that tried to calm him. After physically confronting the first referee, assistant coach Biboy Ravanes tried to calm him down but Balkman shoved Ravanes out of the way. After this, he moved to the second referee and again argued and initiated contact. At this point, Ronald Tubid, a teammate of Balkman, tried to get between him and the second referee. Balkman then moved to the third official, while being shadowed by Tubid, until he shoved Tubid out of the way. This is when another teammate, Arwind Santos, tried to intervene by putting himself between the third referee and Balkman. However, Balkman continued with his aggressive behavior, slapping Santos' arm and eventually shoving him. When Santos pushed him back, Balkman pushed him once again and then grabbed Santos' neck as their teammates tried to separate them. Balkman later apologized via his Twitter account. He said he apologized to his teammates, Santos and Santos' family as well as the team's management, and added, "Everybody does something once in a life, they’re not supposed to do. At the time I blanked out and went at it. [...] It's my first time ever in my entire life to do that." On March 11, 2013, Balkman was banned for life from the PBA. He was also fined for P250,000 or $6,150.

=== Elimination round ===
Pos	Team	W	L	PCT	GB	Qualification
1	Alaska Aces	11	3	.786	—	Twice-to-beat in the quarterfinals
2	Rain or Shine Elasto Painters	9	5	.643	2	Twice-to-beat in the quarterfinals
3	Petron Blaze Boosters	8	6	.571 (Note: Head-to-head record: Petron 2–0 San Mig)	3	Best-of-three quarterfinals
4	San Mig Coffee Mixers	8	6	.571	3	Best-of-three quarterfinals
5	Meralco Bolts	7	7	.500 (Note: Head-to-head quotient: Meralco 1.01, TNT 1.00, Barangay Ginebra 0.99)	4	Best-of-three quarterfinals
6	Talk 'N Text Tropang Texters	7	7	.500	4	Best-of-three quarterfinals
7	Barangay Ginebra San Miguel	7	7	.500	4	Twice-to-win in the quarterfinals
8	Air21 Express	6	8	.429	5	Twice-to-win in the quarterfinals
9	Barako Bull Energy Cola	5	9	.357	6	
10	GlobalPort Batang Pier	2	12	.143	9	

Source: PBA.ph

=== Playoffs ===
Quarterfinals
(#1 twice-to-beat)
1	Alaska	87
8	Air21	81
(Best-of-3)
4	San Mig Coffee	2
5	Meralco	1
(#2 twice-to-beat)
2	Rain or Shine	83	79
7	Barangay Ginebra	90	81
(Best-of-3)
3	Petron	0
6	Talk 'N Text	2

Semifinals (Best-of-5)
1	Alaska	3
4	San Mig Coffee	1
7	Barangay Ginebra	3
6	Talk 'N Text	2

Finals (Best-of-5)
1	Alaska	3
7	Barangay Ginebra	0

==== Quarterfinals ====
Team 1	Series	Team 2	Game 1	Game 2
(1) Alaska Aces*	1–0	(8) Air21 Express	87–81	—
(2) Rain or Shine Elasto Painters*	0–2	(7) Barangay Ginebra San Miguel	83–90	79–81

Team 1	Series	Team 2	Game 1	Game 2	Game 3
(3) Petron Blaze Boosters	0–2	(6) Talk 'N Text Tropang Texters	93–100	86–96	—
(4) San Mig Coffee Mixers	2–1	(5) Meralco Bolts	85–88	100–92	90–82

*Team has twice-to-beat advantage. Team #1 only has to win once, while Team #2 has to win twice.

==== Semifinals ====
Team 1	Series	Team 2	Game 1	Game 2	Game 3	Game 4	Game 5
(1) Alaska Aces	3–1	(4) San Mig Coffee Mixers	69–71	86–67	89–82 (OT)	83–78	—
(6) Talk 'N Text Tropang Texters	2–3	(7) Barangay Ginebra San Miguel	81–104	85–79	98–80	101–104	103–111

==== Finals ====
Team 1	Series	Team 2	Game 1	Game 2	Game 3	Game 4	Game 5
(1) Alaska Aces	3–0	(7) Barangay Ginebra San Miguel	87–70	104–90	104–80	—	—

- Finals MVP: Sonny Thoss (Alaska)
- Best Player of the Conference: LA Tenorio (Ginebra)
- Bobby Parks Best Import of the Conference: Robert Dozier (Alaska)

== 2013 Governors' Cup ==
=== Player movement ===
Key transactions:

=== Coaching changes ===
- Gee Abanilla was appointed as head coach of Petron Blaze Boosters. Olsen Racela was reassigned as assistant coach for the San Mig Coffee Mixers.
- Ato Agustin was appointed as interim head coach of Barangay Ginebra San Miguel after Alfrancis Chua resigned from his post. He was later assigned as team manager, taking over Robert Non, who also serves as the board governor of the team.

=== Elimination round ===
Pos	Team	W	L	PCT	GB	Qualification
1	Petron Blaze Boosters	8	1	.889	—	Twice-to-beat in the quarterfinals
2	San Mig Coffee Mixers	6	3	.667	2	Twice-to-beat in the quarterfinals
3	Meralco Bolts	5	4	.556 (Note: Head-to-head record: Meralco 1–0 Rain or Shine)	3	Twice-to-beat in the quarterfinals
4	Rain or Shine Elasto Painters	5	4	.556	3	Twice-to-beat in the quarterfinals
5	GlobalPort Batang Pier	4	5	.444 (Note: Head-to-head quotient: GlobalPort 1.01, Barako Bull 1.00, Alaska 0.99)	4	Twice-to-win in the quarterfinals
6	Barako Bull Energy	4	5	.444	4	Twice-to-win in the quarterfinals
7	Alaska Aces	4	5	.444	4	Twice-to-win in the quarterfinals
8	Barangay Ginebra San Miguel	3	6	.333 (Note: Head-to-head quotient: Talk 'N Text 1.05, Barangay Ginebra 1.00, Air21 0.96; eighth seed playoff: Barangay Ginebra 110–102 Talk 'N Text)	5	Twice-to-win in the quarterfinals
9	Talk 'N Text Tropang Texters	3	6	.333	5	
10	Air21 Express	3	6	.333	5	

Source: PBA.ph

=== Playoffs ===
Quarterfinals (Top 4 twice-to-beat)
1	Petron Blaze	101
8	Barangay Ginebra	94
4	Rain or Shine	108
5	GlobalPort	106
2	San Mig Coffee	105	83
7	Alaska	112	73
3	Meralco	86
6	Barako Bull	68

Semifinals (Best-of-5)
1	Petron Blaze	3
4	Rain or Shine	1
2	San Mig Coffee	3
3	Meralco	1

Finals (Best-of-7)
1	Petron Blaze	3
2	San Mig Coffee	4

==== Quarterfinals ====
Team 1	Series	Team 2	Game 1	Game 2
(1) Petron Blaze Boosters	1–0	(8) Barangay Ginebra San Miguel	101–94	—
(2) San Mig Coffee Mixers*	1–1	(7) Alaska Aces	105–112	83–73
(3) Meralco Bolts*	1–0	(6) Barako Bull Energy Cola	83–68	—
(4) Rain or Shine Elasto Painters*	1–0	(5) GlobalPort Batang Pier	108–106	—

*Team has twice-to-beat advantage. Team #1 only has to win once, while Team #2 has to win twice.

==== Semifinals ====
Team 1	Series	Team 2	Game 1	Game 2	Game 3	Game 4	Game 5
(1) Petron Blaze Boosters	3–1	(4) Rain or Shine Elasto Painters	91–83	90–88	87–92	110–89	—
(2) San Mig Coffee Mixers	3–1	(3) Meralco Bolts	83–73	69–73	94–87	79–73	—

==== Finals ====
Team 1	Series	Team 2	Game 1	Game 2	Game 3	Game 4	Game 5	Game 6	Game 7
(1) Petron Blaze Boosters	3–4	(2) San Mig Coffee Mixers	100–84	93–100	90–68	86–88	103–114	99–88	77–87

- Finals MVP: Marc Pingris (San Mig Coffee)
- Best Player of the Conference: Arwind Santos (Petron)
- Bobby Parks Best Import of the Conference: Marqus Blakely (San Mig Coffee)

== Individual awards ==
=== Leo Awards ===
- Most Valuable Player: Arwind Santos (Petron)
- Rookie of the Year: Calvin Abueva (Alaska)
- First Mythical Team:
  - Arwind Santos (Petron)
  - Calvin Abueva (Alaska)
  - Ranidel de Ocampo (Talk 'N Text)
  - LA Tenorio (Ginebra)
  - Jayson Castro (Talk 'N Text)
- Second Mythical Team:
  - Marc Pingris (San Mig Coffee)
  - June Mar Fajardo (Petron)
  - Sonny Thoss (Alaska)
  - Alex Cabagnot (Petron)
  - Cyrus Baguio (Alaska)
- All-Defensive Team:
  - Marc Pingris (San Mig Coffee)
  - Sonny Thoss (Alaska)
  - Arwind Santos (Petron)
  - Gabe Norwood (Rain or Shine)
  - Marcio Lassiter (Petron)
- Most Improved Player: Niño Canaleta (Air 21)
- Sportsmanship Award: JV Casio (Alaska)

=== Awards given by the PBA Press Corps ===
- Defensive Player of the Year: Marc Pingris (San Mig Coffee)
- Scoring Champion: Gary David (GlobalPort)
- Baby Dalupan Coach of the Year: Luigi Trillo (Alaska)
- Mr. Quality Minutes: Jervy Cruz (Rain or Shine)
- Comeback Player of the Year: Marcio Lassiter (Petron Blaze)
- Danny Floro Executive of the Year: Robert Non and Chito Salud
- Order of Merit: LA Tenorio (Ginebra)
- All-Rookie Team
  - Calvin Abueva (Alaska)
  - June Mar Fajardo (Petron Blaze)
  - Alex Mallari (Petron Blaze/San Mig Coffee)
  - Cliff Hodge (Meralco)
  - Chris Tiu (Rain or Shine)

== Cumulative standings ==
Pos	Team	Pld	W	L	PCT	Best finish
1	Alaska Aces	54	35	19	.648	Champions
2	Talk 'N Text Tropang Texters	56	35	21	.625	Champions
3	San Mig Coffee Mixers	64	38	26	.594	Champions
4	Petron Blaze Boosters	52	29	23	.558	Finalist
5	Rain or Shine Elasto Painters	57	31	26	.544	Finalist
6	Meralco Bolts	47	23	24	.489	Semifinalist
7	Barangay Ginebra San Miguel	51	23	28	.451	Finalist
8	Air21 Express	39	14	25	.359	Quarterfinalist
9	Barako Bull Energy Cola	38	13	25	.342	Quarterfinalist
10	GlobalPort Batang Pier	38	7	31	.184	Quarterfinalist

=== Elimination rounds ===
Pos	Team	Pld	W	L	PCT
1	San Mig Coffee Mixers	37	24	13	.649
2	Alaska Aces	37	23	14	.622 (Note: Elimination round head-to-head: Alaska 3–1 Rain or Shine)
3	Rain or Shine Elasto Painters	37	23	14	.622
4	Petron Blaze Boosters	37	22	15	.595 (Note: Elimination round head-to-head: Petron 3–2 Talk 'N Text)
5	Talk 'N Text Tropang Texters	37	22	15	.595
6	Meralco Bolts	37	20	17	.541
7	Barangay Ginebra San Miguel	37	17	20	.459
8	Air21 Express	37	14	23	.378
9	Barako Bull Energy Cola	37	13	24	.351
10	GlobalPort Batang Pier	37	7	30	.189

=== Playoffs ===
Pos	Team	Pld	W	L
1	San Mig Coffee Mixers	27	14	13
2	Talk 'N Text Tropang Texters	19	13	6
3	Alaska Aces	17	12	5
4	Rain or Shine Elasto Painters	20	8	12
5	Petron Blaze Boosters	15	7	8
6	Barangay Ginebra San Miguel	14	6	8
7	Meralco Bolts	10	3	7
8	GlobalPort Batang Pier	1	0	1
9	Barako Bull Energy Cola	1	0	1
10	Air21 Express	2	0	2
