= 2012 PBA draft =

Player selection in Philippine basketball

General information
- Date: August 19, 2012
- Time: 4:00 pm (PHT)
- Location: Robinson's Midtown Mall
- Network: AKTV

Overview
- League: Philippine Basketball Association
- First selection: June Mar Fajardo, Petron Blaze Boosters

The 2012 Philippine Basketball Association (PBA) rookie draft was an event held at Robinson's Midtown Mall in Ermita, Manila on August 19, 2012 which allowed PBA teams to draft players from the amateur ranks.

== Draft lottery ==
The lottery determined the team that will obtain the first pick on the draft. The remaining first-round picks and the second-round picks were assigned to teams in reverse order of their cumulative win–loss record in the previous season, with records from the Philippine Cup having heavier weight.

The lottery was held on July 22, 2012, during halftime of Game 1 of the 2012 PBA Governors Cup Finals at the Smart Araneta Coliseum in Quezon City. The Air21 Express won the rights to the first overall selection against the Alaska Aces, but due to a previous transaction, the draft rights of Air21 went to the Petron Blaze Boosters.

== Draft ==
PG	Point guard	SG	Shooting guard	SF	Small forward	PF	Power forward	C	Center	*	Mythical team member	^{#}	All-star

=== 1st round ===
Round	Pick	Player	Position	Country of origin*	Team	College
1	1	* June Mar Fajardo	C	Philippines	Petron Blaze Boosters (from Barako Bull via Air21)^{[a]}	UC
1	2	* Calvin Abueva	SF/PF	Philippines	Alaska Aces	San Sebastian
1	3	# Alex Mallari	SF/SG	United States	Petron Blaze Boosters(from Barako Bull) ^{[a]}	Lewis-Clark State
1	4	* Cliff Hodge	PF	United States	Meralco Bolts	Reedley College
1	5	# Aldrech Ramos	PF/C	Philippines	Barako Bull Energy (from Petron Blaze^{[a]}, traded to B-Meg^{[B]})	FEU
1	6	# Chris Ellis	SF	United States	Barangay Ginebra San Miguel (from Barako Bull via GlobalPort*) ^{[b]}	Mary Hardin-Baylor
1	7	# Chris Tiu	PG/SG	Philippines	Rain or Shine Elasto Painters	Ateneo
1	8	Keith Jensen	SF	United States	Barangay Ginebra San Miguel	New York
1	9	# Vic Manuel	PF	Philippines	B-Meg Llamados (traded to GlobalPort)^{[A]}	PSBA
1	10	Jason Deutchman	PF/SF	United States	GlobalPort Batang Pier (from Talk 'N Text)^{[c]}	San Diego State

=== 2nd round ===
Round	Pick	Player	Position	Country of origin*	Team	College
2	1	Yousef Taha	C	Philippines	Air21 Express (from Alaska)^{[d]}	North Lake/Mapúa
2	2	Dave Marcelo	C	Philippines	B-Meg Llamados (from Barako Bull via Air21^{[e]}, traded to Barako Bull^{[B]})	San Beda
2	3	Jewel Ponferada	C/PF	Philippines	B-Meg Llamados (from Barako Bull)^{[f]}	NU
2	4	AJ Mandani	PG	Canada	GlobalPort Batang Pier (from Meralco)^{[g]}	Missouri S&T
2	5	Lester Alvarez	PG	Philippines	Barako Bull Energy (from Petron Blaze) ^{[h]}	Adamson
2	6	#Emman Monfort	PG	Philippines	Barako Bull Energy (from GlobalPort) ^{[i]}	Ateneo
2	7	Kelly Nabong	PF/C	Philippines	Rain or Shine Elasto Painters (traded to Meralco)^{[C]}	Santa Rosa JC
2	8	Woody Co	PF	Philippines	Barako Bull Energy (from Barangay Ginebra)^{[f]}	UP Diliman
2	9	Raphy Reyes	PG	Philippines	Alaska Aces (from Barako Bull via B-Meg)^{[j]}	UE
2	10	Jaypee Belencion	SG/SF	Philippines	Talk 'N Text Tropang Texters	Letran

=== 3rd round ===
Note: This is the natural drafting order.

Round	Pick	Player	Position	Country of origin*	Team	College
3	1	Simon Atkins	PG	Philippines	Air21 Express	De La Salle
3	2	Karl Dehesa	SG	United States	Alaska Aces	Waldorf
3	3	Ryan Boado	SG	United States	Barako Bull Energy	Houston
3	4	Janus Lozada	SF	Philippines	Meralco Bolts	Adamson
3	5	Mark Sarangay	C/PF	Philippines	Petron Blaze Boosters	Mapúa
3	6	Mark Acosta	PF/SF	Philippines	GlobalPort Batang Pier	Mapúa
3	7	Bacon Austria	SG	Philippines	Rain or Shine Elasto Painters	Ateneo
3	8	Jerick Cañada	PG	Philippines	Barangay Ginebra San Miguel	Adamson
3	9	Gian Chiu	C	United States	B-Meg Llamados	Oberlin
3	10	Jason Escueta	C/PF	Philippines	Talk 'N Text Tropang Texters	Ateneo

=== 4th round ===
Round	Pick	Player	Position	Country of origin*	Team	College
4	1	Kokoy Hermosisima	SG	Philippines	Barako Bull Energy	NU
4	2	Eric Suguitan	C	Philippines	Meralco Bolts	ACSAT
4	3	Jan Colina	PF	Philippines	GlobalPort Batang Pier	Adamson
4	4	Jewel Palomique	SG	Philippines	Rain or Shine Elasto Painters	Mapúa
4	5	Paul Zamar	SG/PG	Philippines	Barangay Ginebra San Miguel	UE
4	6	Ramon Mabayo	PF	Philippines	B-Meg Llamados	STI

Note: Air21, Alaska, Petron Blaze, and Talk 'N Text passed in this round.

=== 5th round ===
Round	Pick	Player	Position	Country of origin*	Team	College
5	1	VJ Serios	PF	Philippines	GlobalPort Batang Pier	UP Diliman
5	2	JR Buensuceso	PG	United States	Barangay Ginebra San Miguel	Brigham Young-Hawaii

Note: Barako Bull, Meralco, Rain or Shine and B-Meg passed in this round.

=== 6th round ===
Round	Pick	Player	Position	Country of origin*	Team	College
6	1	Elliot Tan	SG	United States	Barangay Ginebra San Miguel	Biola

Note: GlobalPort passed in this round.

== Trades involving draft picks ==
=== Pre-draft trades ===
Note: All traded draft picks associated to GlobalPort previously belonged to the Powerade Tigers before selling their franchise to Sultan 900 Capital, Inc.
Prior to the day of the draft, the following trades were made and resulted in exchanges of draft picks between the teams.

- ^{a 1} ^{2} ^{3} On May 14, 2011, Petron (as San Miguel) acquired two first round picks and a 2012 first round pick from Barako Bull (as Air21) in exchange for 2012 and 2013 first round picks. Previously, in a three-team trade, Barako Bull (as Burger King) acquired the 2012 pick and a 2010 first round pick on October 12, 2009, from Barako Energy Coffee in a three-team trade with Talk 'N Text. The Barako Energy Coffee franchise was bought by the Lina Group of Companies in 2011 and was renamed as the Shopinas.com Clickers then later as the Air21 Express. The original Air21 Express however was renamed as the Barako Bull Energy in 2011 after the Lina Group acquired the majority share of the Energy Food and Drinks, a subsidiary of Photokina Marketing which owns the Barako Bull brand.
- ^{b} On July 18, 2011, Barangay Ginebra acquired a 2012 first round pick and KG Canaleta from Barako Bull (as Air21) to in exchange for Willie Miller. Previously, the Express acquired the pick and a 2011 second round pick on August 29, 2010, from Powerade in exchange for Ren-Ren Ritualo, Sean Anthony and the draft rights to 18th pick Jai Reyes.
- ^{c}
- ^{d} On May 29, 2012, Air21 acquired Eric Salamat and a second round pick from Alaska in exchange for RJ Jazul.
- ^{e}
- ^{f 1} ^{2} On November 16, 2011, in a three-team trade, Barako Bull acquired Jimbo Aquino, a 2012 second round pick and a 2013 first round pick from Barangay Ginebra, B-Meg acquired a 2012 second round pick from the Energy Cola and Yancy de Ocampo from Ginebra, and Ginebra acquired Rico Maierhofer from the Llamados and Allein Maliksi from the Energy Cola.
- ^{g} On September 22, 2010, in a three-team trade, Powerade acquired a 2012 second round pick and Rob Reyes from Barako Bull Energy Boosters, and a 2011 first round pick and a 2012 second round pick from Meralco; the Bolts acquired Asi Taulava from the Tigers; and the Boosters acquired Jason Misolas and Khasim Mirza from the Bolts and Ken Bono from the Boosters.
- ^{h}
- ^{i} On January 31, 2011, Barako Bull (as Air21) acquired a second round pick and a 2013 first round pick from Powerade in exchange for J.R. Quiñahan.
- ^{j} On May 30, 2011, Alaska acquired a 2012 second round pick, a 2011 second round pick and Jay-R Reyes from Barako Bull (as Air21) in exchange for Joe Devance. Previously, Air21 acquired the 2012 pick from B-Meg from a previous transaction.

=== Draft-day trades ===
- ^{A} The GlobalPort Batang Pier acquired the draft rights to 9th pick Vic Manuel and Val Acuña from B-Meg in exchange for Sean Anthony.
- ^{B 1} ^{2} The Barako Bull Energy acquired the draft rights to 12th pick Dave Marcelo and Sean Anthony (who was traded from GlobalPort earlier in the first round), in exchange for Barako Bull's draft rights for Aldrech Ramos.
- ^{C} The Meralco Bolts acquired the draft rights to 17th pick Kelly Nabong from Rain or Shine in exchange for Meralco's 2015 second round pick.

== Undrafted players ==
Name	Country of birth	College
Don Tirso Trinidad	New Zealand	Ashburton College
Daryl Trinidad	Philippines	Our Lady of Fatima University
Fhadzmir "Toto" Bandaying	Philippines	UE
Jesse Bustos	Philippines	Philippine Maritime Institute
Andrian Celada	Philippines	Arellano
Erwin Cornejo	Philippines	Mapua
Anthony Del Rio	Philippines	San Sebastian
Franz Delgado	Philippines	San Sebastian
June Dizon	Philippines	UST
Paul Gonzalgo	Philippines	Adamson
Mark Jeffries	United States	San Diego Mesa College
Rex Leynes	Philippines	St. Francis of Assisi
Allan Mangahas	Philippines	Mapua
Louie Renn Medalla	Philippines	University of Mindanao
Christopher Pestano	Philippines	George Brown/Centennial College
Danny Pribhdas	Philippines	UST
Jerome Rubi	Philippines	CSU – Northridge
Stephen Siruma	Philippines	PCU
Robby Zablan	Philippines	AMA
