= 2013 PBA Governors' Cup =

Third conference of the 2012–13 PBA season

- Duration: August 14 – October 25, 2013
- TV partner(s): Local: Sports5 on IBC (eliminations, playoffs) / TV5 (finals) / AksyonTV; Worldwide: AksyonTV International

Finals
- Champions: San Mig Coffee Mixers
- Runners-up: Petron Blaze Boosters

Awards
- Best Player: Arwind Santos (Petron Blaze Boosters)
- Best Import: Marqus Blakely (San Mig Coffee Mixers)
- Finals MVP: Marc Pingris (San Mig Coffee Mixers)

PBA Governors' Cup chronology
- < 2012 2014 >

PBA conference chronology
- < 2013 Commissioner's 2013–14 Philippine >

The 2013 Philippine Basketball Association (PBA) Governors' Cup was the third and last conference of the 2012–13 PBA season. Due to the preparations for the 2013 FIBA Asia Championship, the conference started on August 14, 2013, and finished on October 25, 2013.

The tournament is an import-laden format, which allows an import or a pure-foreign player for each team and with a height limit of 6-foot-5.

The finals is sponsored by PLDT Telpad.

== Format ==
The tournament format for this conference is as follows:

- Single-round robin eliminations; 9 games per team; Teams are then seeded by basis on win–loss records.
- Top eight teams will advance to the quarterfinals. In case of tie, playoffs will be held only for the #4 and #8 seeds.
- Quarterfinals:
  - QF1: #1 seed vs #8 seed (#1 seed twice-to-beat)
  - QF2: #2 seed vs #7 seed (#2 seed twice-to-beat)
  - QF3: #3 seed vs #6 seed (#3 seed twice-to-beat)
  - QF4: #4 seed vs #5 seed (#4 seed twice-to-beat)
- Semifinals (best-of-5 series):
  - SF1: QF1 vs. QF4 winners
  - SF2: QF2 vs. QF3 winners
- Finals (best-of-7 series)
  - Winners of the semifinals

== Elimination round ==
=== Team standings ===
Pos	Team	W	L	PCT	GB	Qualification
1	Petron Blaze Boosters	8	1	.889	—	Twice-to-beat in the quarterfinals
2	San Mig Coffee Mixers	6	3	.667	2	Twice-to-beat in the quarterfinals
3	Meralco Bolts	5	4	.556 (Note: Head-to-head record: Meralco 1–0 Rain or Shine)	3	Twice-to-beat in the quarterfinals
4	Rain or Shine Elasto Painters	5	4	.556	3	Twice-to-beat in the quarterfinals
5	GlobalPort Batang Pier	4	5	.444 (Note: Head-to-head quotient: GlobalPort 1.01, Barako Bull 1.00, Alaska 0.99)	4	Twice-to-win in the quarterfinals
6	Barako Bull Energy	4	5	.444	4	Twice-to-win in the quarterfinals
7	Alaska Aces	4	5	.444	4	Twice-to-win in the quarterfinals
8	Barangay Ginebra San Miguel	3	6	.333 (Note: Head-to-head quotient: Talk 'N Text 1.05, Barangay Ginebra 1.00, Air21 0.96; eighth seed playoff: Barangay Ginebra 110–102 Talk 'N Text)	5	Twice-to-win in the quarterfinals
9	Talk 'N Text Tropang Texters	3	6	.333	5	
10	Air21 Express	3	6	.333	5	

Source: PBA.ph

=== Schedule ===
Team ╲ Game	1	2	3	4	5	6	7	8	9
Air21	GP	SMC	BBEC	PBB	ROS	BGSM	TNT	MER	ALA
Alaska	GP	ROS	BGSM	MER	TNT	SMC	PBB	BBEC	A21
Barako Bull	TNT	MER	A21	BGSM	PBB	GP	ROS	SMC	ALA
Barangsy Ginebra	PBB	MER	BBEC	ALA	A21	SMC	ROS	GP	TNT
GlobalPort	A21	ROS	ALA	TNT	SMC	BBEC	MER	PBB	BGSM
Meralco	PBB	BBEC	BGSM	TNT	ALA	ROS	GP	A21	SMC
Petron Blaze	MER	BGSM	ROS	A21	SMC	BBEC	TNT	ALA	GP
Rain or Shine	SMC	GP	PBB	ALA	A21	MER	BBEC	BGSM	TNT
San Mig Coffee	ROS	A21	TNT	PBB	GP	BGSM	ALA	BBEC	MER
Talk 'N Text	BBEC	SMC	MER	GP	ALA	PBB	A21	ROS	BGSM

= Win; = OT win; = Loss; = OT loss

=== Results ===
Team	A21	ALA	BBEC	BGSM	GP	MER	PBB	ROS	SMC	TNT
Air21		121–107	94–103	93–106	94–101	91–100	86–112	95–109	93–82	106–102
Alaska	–		91–89	102–99	88–91	74–84	100–103	94–79	82–95	112–104
Barako Bull	–	–		104–91	98–97	90–89	87–112	93–120	77–81	113–118*
Barangay Ginebra	–	–	–		106–113*	98–85	95–101	101–100	86–89	99–113
GlobalPort	–	–	–	–		91–79	90–101	74–94	88–102	95–102
Meralco	–	–	–	–	–		89–83	82–76	87–88	92–86
Petron Blaze	–	–	–	–	–	–		99–84	89–83	122–88
Rain or Shine	–	–	–	–	–	–	–		79–75	104–102
San Mig Coffee	–	–	–	–	–	–	–	–		118–99
Talk 'N Text	–	–	–	–	–	–	–	–	–	

Legend: Blue = left column team win; Red = top row team win.
Matches with lighter background shading were decided after overtime.

== Eighth seed playoff ==
September 24

Talk 'N Text Tropang Texters 102, Barangay Ginebra San Miguel 110

Smart Araneta Coliseum, Quezon City

== Bracket ==
Quarterfinals
(#1 twice to beat)
1	Petron Blaze	101
8	Barangay Ginebra	94
(#4 twice to beat)
4	Rain or Shine	108
5	GlobalPort	106
(#2 twice to beat)
2	San Mig Coffee	105	83
7	Alaska	112	73
(#3 twice to beat)
3	Meralco	86
6	Barako Bull	68

Semifinals (best-of-5)
1	Petron Blaze	3
4	Rain or Shine	1
2	San Mig Coffee	3
3	Meralco	1

Finals (best-of-7)
1	Petron Blaze	3
2	San Mig Coffee	4

== Quarterfinals ==
=== (1) Petron Blaze vs. (8) Barangay Ginebra ===
September 26

Petron Blaze Boosters 101, Barangay Ginebra San Miguel 94
Petron wins series in one game

Mall of Asia Arena, Pasay

=== (2) San Mig Coffee vs. (7) Alaska ===
September 25

San Mig Coffee Mixers 105, Alaska Aces 112

Smart Araneta Coliseum, Quezon City

September 27

San Mig Coffee Mixers 83, Alaska Aces 73
San Mig Coffee wins series in two games

Mall of Asia Arena, Pasay

=== (3) Meralco vs. (6) Barako Bull ===
September 25

Meralco Bolts 86, Barako Bull Energy Cola 68
Meralco wins series in one game

Smart Araneta Coliseum, Quezon City

=== (4) Rain or Shine vs. (5) GlobalPort ===
September 26

Rain or Shine Elasto Painters 108, GlobalPort Batang Pier 106
Rain or Shine wins series in one game

Mall of Asia Arena, Pasay

== Semifinals ==
=== (1) Petron Blaze vs. (4) Rain or Shine ===
September 30

Petron Blaze Boosters 91, Rain or Shine Elasto Painters 83

Smart Araneta Coliseum, Quezon City

October 2

Petron Blaze Boosters 90, Rain or Shine Elasto Painters 88

Cuneta Astrodome, Pasay

October 5

Petron Blaze Boosters 87, Rain or Shine Elasto Painters 92

Cuneta Astrodome, Pasay

October 7

Petron Blaze Boosters 110, Rain or Shine Elasto Painters 89
Petron Blaze wins series, 3–1

Smart Araneta Coliseum, Quezon City

=== (2) San Mig Coffee vs. (3) Meralco ===
September 29

San Mig Coffee Mixers 83, Meralco Bolts 73

Smart Araneta Coliseum, Quezon City

October 1

San Mig Coffee Mixers 69, Meralco Bolts 73

Smart Araneta Coliseum, Quezon City

October 4

San Mig Coffee Mixers 94, Meralco Bolts 87

Smart Araneta Coliseum, Quezon City

October 6

San Mig Coffee Mixers 79, Meralco Bolts 73
San Mig Coffee wins series, 3–1

Smart Araneta Coliseum, Quezon City

== Finals ==
October 11

Petron Blaze Boosters 100, San Mig Coffee Mixers 84

Mall of Asia Arena, Pasay

October 13

Petron Blaze Boosters 93, San Mig Coffee Mixers 100

Smart Araneta Coliseum, Quezon City

October 16

Petron Blaze Boosters 90, San Mig Coffee Mixers 68

Smart Araneta Coliseum, Quezon City

October 18

Petron Blaze Boosters 86, San Mig Coffee Mixers 88

Mall of Asia Arena, Pasay

October 20

Petron Blaze Boosters 103, San Mig Coffee Mixers 114

Smart Araneta Coliseum, Quezon City

October 23

Petron Blaze Boosters 99, San Mig Coffee Mixers 88

Smart Araneta Coliseum, Quezon City

October 25

Petron Blaze Boosters 77, San Mig Coffee Mixers 87
San Mig Coffee wins series, 4–3

Smart Araneta Coliseum, Quezon City

== Imports ==
The following is the list of imports, which had played for their respective teams at least once, with the returning imports in italics. Highlighted are the imports who stayed with their respective teams for the whole conference.

Team	Name	Debuted	Last game	Record
Air21 Express	Zach Graham	August 14 (vs. GlobalPort)	September 22 (vs. Alaska Aces)	3–6
Alaska Aces	Wendell McKines	August 23 (vs. GlobalPort)	September 27 (vs. San Mig Coffee)	5–6
Barako Bull Energy Cola	Mike Singletary	August 15 (vs. Talk 'N Text)	September 25 (vs. Meralco)	4–6
Barangay Ginebra San Miguel	Dior Lowhorn	August 18 (vs. Petron)	September 26 (vs. Petron)	4–7
GlobalPort Batang Pier	Markeith Cummings	August 14 (vs. Air21)	September 26 (vs. Rain or Shine)	4–6
Meralco Bolts	Mario West	August 16 (vs. Petron)	October 6 (vs. San Mig Coffee)	7–7
Petron Blaze Boosters	Elijah Millsap	August 16 (vs. Meralco)	October 25 (vs. San Mig Coffee)	15–7
Rain or Shine Elasto Painters	Arizona Reid	August 14 (vs. San Mig Coffee)	October 7 (vs. Petron)	7–7
San Mig Coffee Mixers	Marqus Blakely	August 14 (vs. Rain or Shine)	October 25 (vs. Petron)	15–8
Talk 'N Text Tropang Texters	Tony Mitchell	August 15 (vs. Barako Bull)	September 13 (vs. Air21)	2–5
Talk 'N Text Tropang Texters	Courtney Fells	September 18 (vs. Rain or Shine)	September 24 (vs. Barangay Ginebra)	1–2

== Awards ==
=== Conference ===
- Best Player of the Conference: Arwind Santos (Petron Blaze Boosters)
- Bobby Parks Best Import of the Conference: Marqus Blakely (San Mig Coffee Mixers)
- Finals MVP: Marc Pingris (San Mig Coffee Mixers)

=== Players of the Week ===
Week	Player	Ref.
August 14–18	Paul Lee (Rain or Shine Elasto Painters)	
August 19–25	LA Tenorio (Barangay Ginebra San Miguel)	
August 26 – September 1	Emman Monfort (Barako Bull Energy Cola)	
September 2–8	James Yap (San Mig Coffee Mixers)	
September 9–15	Marcio Lassiter (Petron Blaze Boosters)	
September 16–22	Jay Washington (GlobalPort Batang Pier)	
September 23–29	Joe Devance (San Mig Coffee Mixers)	
September 30 – October 7	James Yap (San Mig Coffee Mixers); Alex Cabagnot (Petron Blaze Boosters)	
