= 2010–11 Meralco Bolts season =

- Head coach: Ryan Gregorio
- General manager: Virgil Villavicencio
- Owners: Manila Electric Company (an MVP Group subsidiary)

Philippine Cup results
- Record: 7–7 (50%)
- Place: 5th
- Playoff finish: Quarterfinals (by B-Meg Derby Ace 2-0)

Commissioner's Cup results
- Record: 3–6 (33.3%)
- Place: 8th
- Playoff finish: Did not qualify

Governors Cup results
- Record: 3–5 (37.5%)
- Place: 8th
- Playoff finish: Did not qualify

Meralco Bolts seasons

The 2010–11 Meralco Bolts season was the 1st season of the franchise in the Philippine Basketball Association (PBA). The team took over the Sta. Lucia Realtors after the franchise was sold to Manila Electric Company in August 2010.

== Key dates ==
- August 29: The 2010 PBA Draft took place in Fort Bonifacio, Taguig.

== Draft picks ==
Round	Pick	Player	Height	Position	Nationality	College
1	9	Shawn Weinstein	6'1	G	United States	St. Edward's
2	11	Riego Gamalinda	6'3	F	Philippines	San Beda
2	14	Ford Arao	6'6	C/F	Philippines	Ateneo
2	16	Khasim Mirza	6'4	F	Philippines	UST

== Roster ==
2010–11 Meralco Bolts roster
Players

Pos.	#	POB	Name	Height	Weight	DOB (YYYY–MM–DD)	From
PG	2	(United States)	Chris Timberlake	5 ft 10 in (1.78 m)	182 lb (83 kg)		North Florida
PG	3	(Philippines)	Solomon Mercado	6 ft 1 in (1.85 m)	190 lb (86 kg)		Biola
G	4	(Philippines)	Renren Ritualo	6 ft 2 in (1.88 m)	178 lb (81 kg)		De La Salle
C	5	(Tonga)	Asi Taulava	6 ft 9 in (2.06 m)	245 lb (111 kg)		BYU–Hawaii
PG	6	(United States)	Chris Ross (injured)	6 ft 1 in (1.85 m)	180 lb (82 kg)		Marshall
F	7	(Philippines)	Nelbert Omolon	6 ft 4 in (1.93 m)	185 lb (84 kg)		Philippine Christian
F	9	(Philippines)	Yousif Aljamal	6 ft 4 in (1.93 m)	190 lb (86 kg)		San Beda
PF	10	(Philippines)	Gabby Espinas	6 ft 4 in (1.93 m)	194 lb (88 kg)		Philippine Christian
F	12	(Philippines)	Mark Isip	6 ft 4 in (1.93 m)	205 lb (93 kg)		Far Eastern
C	13	(Philippines)	Marlou Aquino (injured)	6 ft 9 in (2.06 m)	240 lb (109 kg)		Adamson
G/F	14	(Philippines)	Mark Cardona	6 ft 2 in (1.88 m)	180 lb (82 kg)		De La Salle
G/F	15	(Philippines)	Rogemar Menor	6 ft 1 in (1.85 m)	185 lb (84 kg)		San Beda
F	21	(Philippines)	Reynel Hugnatan	6 ft 4 in (1.93 m)	210 lb (95 kg)		Manila
G/F	25	(Philippines)	Riego Gamalinda (R)	6 ft 3 in (1.91 m)	184 lb (83 kg)		San Beda
PG	36	(United States)	Shawn Weinstein (R)	6 ft 1 in (1.85 m)	180 lb (82 kg)		St. Edward's
F	52	(Philippines)	Dennis Daa	6 ft 5 in (1.96 m)	210 lb (95 kg)		Centro Escolar Las Piñas

Coaches
Head coach
- (Philippines) Ryan Gregorio (UP Diliman)
Assistant(s)
- (Philippines) Boyet Fernandez (CSA–Bacolod)
- (Philippines) Ronnie Magsanoc (UP Diliman)
- (Philippines) Adonis Tierra (José Rizal)
- (Philippines) Patrick Fran (UST)

Legend
- (DP) Unsigned draft pick
- (FA) Free agent
- (S) Suspended
- (I) Import
- Injured

== Philippine Cup ==
=== Eliminations ===
==== Standings ====
Pos	Team	W	L	PCT	GB	Qualification
1	Talk 'N Text Tropang Texters	11	3	.786 (Note: Head-to-head record: San Miguel 1–1 Talk 'N Text (San Miguel +9))	—	Twice-to-beat in the quarterfinals
2	San Miguel Beermen	11	3	.786	—	Twice-to-beat in the quarterfinals
3	Barangay Ginebra Kings	10	4	.714	1	Best-of-three quarterfinals
4	B-Meg Derby Ace Llamados	7	7	.500 (Note: Head-to-head differential: B-Meg +23, Meralco −11, Alaska −12)	4	Best-of-three quarterfinals
5	Meralco Bolts	7	7	.500	4	Best-of-three quarterfinals
6	Alaska Aces	7	7	.500	4	Best-of-three quarterfinals
7	Air21 Express	6	8	.429	5	Twice-to-win in the quarterfinals
8	Rain or Shine Elasto Painters	5	9	.357	6	Twice-to-win in the quarterfinals
9	Powerade Tigers	3	11	.214 (Note: Head-to-head record: Barako Bull 1–0 Powerade)	8	
10	Barako Bull Energy Boosters	3	11	.214	8	

Source: PBA.ph

== Commissioner's Cup ==
=== Eliminations ===
==== Standings ====
Pos	Team	W	L	PCT	GB	Qualification
1	Talk 'N Text Tropang Texters	8	1	.889	—	Advance to semifinals
2	Smart Gilas (G)	7	2	.778	1	Advance to semifinals
3	Barangay Ginebra Kings	5	4	.556 (Note: Head-to-head differential: Barangay Ginebra +12, Air21 −4, Alaska −8)	3	Advance to quarterfinals
4	Air21 Express	5	4	.556	3	Advance to quarterfinals
5	Alaska Aces	5	4	.556	3	Advance to quarterfinals
6	Rain or Shine Elasto Painters	4	5	.444 (Note: Head-to-head record: Rain or Shine 1–0 B-Meg)	4	Advance to quarterfinals
7	B-Meg Derby Ace Llamados	4	5	.444	4	
8	Meralco Bolts	3	6	.333	5	
9	Powerade Tigers	2	7	.222 (Note: Head-to-head record: Powerade 1–0 San Miguel)	6	
10	San Miguel Beermen	2	7	.222	6	

Source: PBA.ph
(G) Guests

== Governors Cup ==
=== Eliminations ===
==== Standings ====
Pos	Team	W	L	PCT	GB	Qualification
1	Talk 'N Text Tropang Texters	6	2	.750	—	Semifinal round
2	Petron Blaze Boosters	5	3	.625 (Note: Head-to-head differential: Petron +10, Alaska +5, Barangay Ginebra −15)	1	Semifinal round
3	Alaska Aces	5	3	.625	1	Semifinal round
4	Barangay Ginebra Kings	5	3	.625	1	Semifinal round
5	Rain or Shine Elasto Painters	4	4	.500 (Note: Head-to-head differential: Rain or Shine +11, B-Meg 0, Powerade −11)	2	Semifinal round
6	B-Meg Derby Ace Llamados	4	4	.500	2	Semifinal round
7	Powerade Tigers	4	4	.500	2	
8	Meralco Bolts	3	5	.375	3	
9	Air21 Express	0	8	.000	6	

Source: PBA.ph

== Transactions ==
=== Pre-season ===
==== Trades ====
August 20, 2010	To Meralco Beau Belga (from Air21)	To Air21 J.R. Quiñahan (from Talk 'N Text)	To Talk 'N Text Ali Peek (from Meralco)
August 20, 2010	To Meralco Mark Cardona (from Talk 'N Text)	To Air21 Josh Urbiztondo (from Meralco); 2010 1st round pick (from Meralco)	To Talk 'N Text Ali Peek (from Meralco); 2010 1st round pick (from Air21)

August 29, 2010	To Meralco 2010 second round pick (Shawn Weinstein)	To Alaska Bonbon Custodio

September 22, 2010	To Meralco Asi Taulava (from Powerade)	To Barako Bull Jason Misolas (from Meralco); Khasim Mirza (from Meralco); Ken Bono (from Powerade)	To Powerade Robert Reyes (from Barako Bull); 2011 and 2012 2nd round picks (from Meralco); 2013 2nd round pick (from Barako Bull)

=== Philippine Cup ===
==== Trades ====
November 3, 2010	To Meralco Hans Thiele	To Barako Bull Dennis Daa; 2013 2nd round pick
December 14, 2010	To Meralco Reed Juntilla; Mark Isip	To Barako Bull Ford Arao; Kazim Mirza; Pong Escobal; Marlou Aquino; 2012 1st round draft pick

January 20, 2011
To Meralco

Solomon Mercado (from Rain or Shine)
Paolo Bugia (from Rain or Shine)
Erick Rodriguez (from Air21)

To Air21

Jay-R Reyes (from Rain or Shine)
Reed Juntilla (from Meralco)
2011 and 2013 2nd round picks (from Meralco)
To Rain or Shine

Ronjay Buenafe (from Air21)
Ronnie Matias (from Air21)
Beau Belga (from Meralco)
2011 and 2013 1st round picks (from Air21)

=== Commissioner's Cup ===
==== Free agents ====
===== Additions =====
Player	Signed	Former team
Marlou Aquino	February 14, 2011	Barako Bull (via free agency)

==== Trades ====
February 15, 2010	To Meralco Reynel Hugnatan	To Alaska Hans Thiele; Paolo Bugia

=== Imports recruited ===
Conference	Name	Debuted	Last game	Record
Commissioner's Cup	(United States) Anthony Danridge	February 18 (vs. Barangay Ginebra)	March 4 (vs. San Miguel)	0–3
Commissioner's Cup	(United States) Chamberlain Oguchi	March 11 (vs. Talk 'N Text)	April 2 (vs. Smart Gilas)	3-3
Governors Cup	(United States) Chamberlain Oguchi	June 12 (vs. Petron Blaze)	June 26 (vs. B-Meg)	2-2
Governors Cup	(United States) Tim Pickett	July 7 (vs. Air21)	July 20 (vs. Powerade)	1–3
