= 2010–11 Barako Bull Energy Boosters season =

- Head coach: Junel Baculi
- General manager: Andy Jao
- Owner: Photokina Marketing Corporation

Philippine Cup results
- Record: 3–11 (21.4%)
- Place: 10th
- Playoff finish: did not qualify

Barako Bull Energy Boosters seasons

The 2010–11 Barako Bull Energy Boosters season was the 11th and final season of the franchise in the Philippine Basketball Association (PBA).

== Key dates ==
- August 29: The 2009 PBA Draft took place in Fort Bonifacio, Taguig.

== Draft picks ==
Round	Pick	Player	Height	Position	Nationality	College
2	17	Borgie Hermida	5 ft. 8 in.	Point guard	Philippines	San Beda

== Roster ==
2010–11 Barako Bull Energy Boosters roster
Players
Coaches

Pos.	#	POB	Name	Height	Weight	DOB (YYYY–MM–DD)	From
SF	-	(United States)	Vaughn Canta (R)	6 ft 3 in (1.91 m)	210 lb (95 kg)		Cosumnes River
SF	-	(Philippines)	Khasim Mirza (R)	6 ft 4 in (1.93 m)	185 lb (84 kg)		UST
C	4	(Philippines)	Mark Andaya	6 ft 8 in (2.03 m)	220 lb (100 kg)		Letran
SF	5	(United States)	Wainwright, Robert	6 ft 5 in (1.96 m)	200 lb (91 kg)		Solano CC
F/C	7	(Philippines)	Ken Bono	6 ft 5 in (1.96 m)	220 lb (100 kg)		Adamson
PG	9	(Philippines)	Marvin Cruz	5 ft 8 in (1.73 m)	160 lb (73 kg)		UP Diliman
PG	12	(Philippines)	Paolo Hubalde	5 ft 9 in (1.75 m)	170 lb (77 kg)		UE
F	15	(Philippines)	Jason Misolas	6 ft 3 in (1.91 m)	195 lb (88 kg)		Letran
PG	16	(Philippines)	Borgie Hermida (R)	5 ft 9 in (1.75 m)	160 lb (73 kg)		San Beda
F	20	(Philippines)	Richard Alonzo	6 ft 3 in (1.91 m)	209 lb (95 kg)		Adamson
F/C	22	(Philippines)	Dennis Daa	6 ft 5 in (1.96 m)	200 lb (91 kg)		Centro Escolar Las Piñas
SF	26	(Philippines)	Viray, Bruce	6 ft 3 in (1.91 m)	190 lb (86 kg)		San Sebastian
F/C	55	(Philippines)	Richard Yee	6 ft 5 in (1.96 m)	205 lb (93 kg)		UST
PG	88	(Philippines)	Aries Dimaunahan (C)	5 ft 11 in (1.80 m)	185 lb (84 kg)		UST

Head coach

- (Philippines) Junel Baculi (Mapúa)

Assistant coach(es)

- (Philippines) Raymund Celis (UP Diliman)
- (Philippines) Elmer Bola-bola (Letran)
- (Philippines) Magnum Membrere (Ateneo)

Legend

- (C) Team captain
- (CI) Commissioner's Cup Import
- (GI) Governors' Cup Import
- (EI) EASL Import
- (DP) Unsigned draft pick
- (FA) Free agent
- (IN) Inactive
- (S) Suspended
- (R) Rookie
- Injured

== Philippine Cup ==
=== Eliminations ===
==== Standings ====
Pos	Team	W	L	PCT	GB	Qualification
1	Talk 'N Text Tropang Texters	11	3	.786 (Note: Head-to-head record: San Miguel 1–1 Talk 'N Text (San Miguel +9))	—	Twice-to-beat in the quarterfinals
2	San Miguel Beermen	11	3	.786	—	Twice-to-beat in the quarterfinals
3	Barangay Ginebra Kings	10	4	.714	1	Best-of-three quarterfinals
4	B-Meg Derby Ace Llamados	7	7	.500 (Note: Head-to-head differential: B-Meg +23, Meralco −11, Alaska −12)	4	Best-of-three quarterfinals
5	Meralco Bolts	7	7	.500	4	Best-of-three quarterfinals
6	Alaska Aces	7	7	.500	4	Best-of-three quarterfinals
7	Air21 Express	6	8	.429	5	Twice-to-win in the quarterfinals
8	Rain or Shine Elasto Painters	5	9	.357	6	Twice-to-win in the quarterfinals
9	Powerade Tigers	3	11	.214 (Note: Head-to-head record: Barako Bull 1–0 Powerade)	8	
10	Barako Bull Energy Boosters	3	11	.214	8	

Source: PBA.ph

== Commissioner's Cup ==
Team filed leave of absence. Did not participate.

== Governors Cup ==
Team filed leave of absence. Did not participate.

== Transactions ==
=== Pre-season ===
==== Trades ====
September 4, 2010	To Barako Bull Sunday Salvacion	To Barangay Ginebra future draft picks

September 22, 2010	To Barako Bull Jason Misolas (from Meralco); Khasim Mirza (from Meralco); Ken Bono (from Powerade)	To Powerade Robert Reyes (from Barako Bull); 2011 and 2012 2nd round picks (from Meralco); 2013 2nd round pick (from Barako Bull)	To Meralco Asi Taulava (from Powerade)

=== Philippine Cup ===
==== Free agents ====
===== Additions =====
Player	Signed	Former team
Hans Thiele	October 2010	undrafted rookie

==== Trades ====
November 3, 2010	To Barako Bull Dennis Daa; 2013 2nd round pick	To Meralco Hans Thiele
December 14, 2010	To Barako Bull Ford Arao; Khazim Mirza; Pong Escobal; Marlou Aquino; 2012 1st round draft pick	To Meralco Reed Juntilla; Mark Isip
December 14, 2010	To Barako Bull Lordy Tugade; Vaughn Canta	To San Miguel Sunday Salvacion
