= 2010–11 Alaska Aces season =

- Head coach: Tim Cone
- General manager: Joaqui Trillo
- Owner: Alaska Milk Corporation

Philippine Cup results
- Record: 7–7 (50%)
- Place: 6th
- Playoff finish: Quarter-finalist (eliminated by Barangay Ginebra, 2-1)

Commissioner's Cup results
- Record: 5–4 (55.6%)
- Place: 5th
- Playoff finish: Quarter-finalist (eliminated by Air21, 2-1)

Governors Cup results
- Record: 8–5 (61.5%)
- Place: 3rd
- Playoff finish: Semifinalist

Alaska Aces seasons

The 2010–11 Alaska Aces season was the 25th season of the franchise in the Philippine Basketball Association (PBA).

== Key dates ==
- August 29: The 2010 PBA Draft took place in Fort Bonifacio, Taguig.

== Draft picks ==
Round	Pick	Player	Height	Position	Nationality	College
1	4	Elmer Espiritu	6 ft. 4 in.	Small forward	Philippines	UE
2	21	Marvin Hayes	6 ft. 2 in.	Small forward	Philippines	Jose Rizal

== Roster ==
2010–11 Alaska Aces roster
Players
Coaches

Pos.	#	POB	Name	Height	Weight	DOB (YYYY–MM–DD)	From
C	1	(Philippines)	Samigue Eman	6 ft 9.5 in (2.07 m)	240 lb (109 kg)		Mindanao
G/F	3	(Philippines)	Cyrus Baguio	6 ft 2 in (1.88 m)	180 lb (82 kg)		UST
PG	5	(Philippines)	LA Tenorio	5 ft 8 in (1.73 m)	155 lb (70 kg)		Ateneo
C	7	(Philippines)	Sonny Thoss	6 ft 7 in (2.01 m)	210 lb (95 kg)		James Cook
F/C	8	(Philippines)	Jay-R Reyes	6 ft 7.5 in (2.02 m)	215 lb (98 kg)		Philippines
F	10	(Philippines)	Mark Borboran	6 ft 4 in (1.93 m)	185 lb (84 kg)		UE
F/C	11	(Philippines)	Hans Thiele (R)	6 ft 5 in (1.96 m)	200 lb (91 kg)		UE
G	13	(Philippines)	Bonbon Custodio	5 ft 11 in (1.80 m)	165 lb (75 kg)		UE
F/C	21	(Philippines)	Paolo Bugia	6 ft 6 in (1.98 m)	200 lb (91 kg)		Ateneo
G/F	24	(Philippines)	Brandon Cablay	6 ft 0 in (1.83 m)	165 lb (75 kg)		Vanguard
F/C	30	(Philippines)	Ervin Sotto	6 ft 7 in (2.01 m)	215 lb (98 kg)		Saint Francis of Assisi
G/F	34	(Philippines)	Wesley Gonzales	6 ft 4 in (1.93 m)	175 lb (79 kg)		Ateneo
SF	35	(Philippines)	Tony dela Cruz (C)	6 ft 4 in (1.93 m)	178 lb (81 kg)		UC Irvine
G	88	(Philippines)	Aries Dimaunahan	5 ft 11 in (1.80 m)	185 lb (84 kg)		UST

Head coach

- (United States) Tim Cone (James Madison)

Assistant coach(es)

- (Philippines) Joel Banal (Mapúa)
- (Philippines) Richard Bachmann (De La Salle)
- (Philippines) Jojo Lastimosa (Ateneo)
- (Philippines) Luigi Trillo (De La Salle)
- (Philippines) Topex Robinson (San Sebastian)

Legend

- (C) Team captain
- (CI) Commissioner's Cup Import
- (GI) Governors' Cup Import
- (EI) EASL Import
- (DP) Unsigned draft pick
- (FA) Free agent
- (IN) Inactive
- (S) Suspended
- (R) Rookie
- Injured

== Philippine Cup ==
=== Eliminations ===
==== Standings ====
Pos	Team	W	L	PCT	GB	Qualification
1	Talk 'N Text Tropang Texters	11	3	.786 (Note: Head-to-head record: San Miguel 1–1 Talk 'N Text (San Miguel +9))	—	Twice-to-beat in the quarterfinals
2	San Miguel Beermen	11	3	.786	—	Twice-to-beat in the quarterfinals
3	Barangay Ginebra Kings	10	4	.714	1	Best-of-three quarterfinals
4	B-Meg Derby Ace Llamados	7	7	.500 (Note: Head-to-head differential: B-Meg +23, Meralco −11, Alaska −12)	4	Best-of-three quarterfinals
5	Meralco Bolts	7	7	.500	4	Best-of-three quarterfinals
6	Alaska Aces	7	7	.500	4	Best-of-three quarterfinals
7	Air21 Express	6	8	.429	5	Twice-to-win in the quarterfinals
8	Rain or Shine Elasto Painters	5	9	.357	6	Twice-to-win in the quarterfinals
9	Powerade Tigers	3	11	.214 (Note: Head-to-head record: Barako Bull 1–0 Powerade)	8	
10	Barako Bull Energy Boosters	3	11	.214	8	

Source: PBA.ph

== Commissioner's Cup ==
=== Eliminations ===
==== Standings ====
Pos	Team	W	L	PCT	GB	Qualification
1	Talk 'N Text Tropang Texters	8	1	.889	—	Advance to semifinals
2	Smart Gilas (G)	7	2	.778	1	Advance to semifinals
3	Barangay Ginebra Kings	5	4	.556 (Note: Head-to-head differential: Barangay Ginebra +12, Air21 −4, Alaska −8)	3	Advance to quarterfinals
4	Air21 Express	5	4	.556	3	Advance to quarterfinals
5	Alaska Aces	5	4	.556	3	Advance to quarterfinals
6	Rain or Shine Elasto Painters	4	5	.444 (Note: Head-to-head record: Rain or Shine 1–0 B-Meg)	4	Advance to quarterfinals
7	B-Meg Derby Ace Llamados	4	5	.444	4	
8	Meralco Bolts	3	6	.333	5	
9	Powerade Tigers	2	7	.222 (Note: Head-to-head record: Powerade 1–0 San Miguel)	6	
10	San Miguel Beermen	2	7	.222	6	

Source: PBA.ph
(G) Guests

== Governors Cup ==
=== Eliminations ===
==== Standings ====
Pos	Team	W	L	PCT	GB	Qualification
1	Talk 'N Text Tropang Texters	6	2	.750	—	Semifinal round
2	Petron Blaze Boosters	5	3	.625 (Note: Head-to-head differential: Petron +10, Alaska +5, Barangay Ginebra −15)	1	Semifinal round
3	Alaska Aces	5	3	.625	1	Semifinal round
4	Barangay Ginebra Kings	5	3	.625	1	Semifinal round
5	Rain or Shine Elasto Painters	4	4	.500 (Note: Head-to-head differential: Rain or Shine +11, B-Meg 0, Powerade −11)	2	Semifinal round
6	B-Meg Derby Ace Llamados	4	4	.500	2	Semifinal round
7	Powerade Tigers	4	4	.500	2	
8	Meralco Bolts	3	5	.375	3	
9	Air21 Express	0	8	.000	6	

Source: PBA.ph

=== Semifinals ===
==== Standings ====
Overall standings
Pos	Team	W	L	PCT	GB	Qualification
1	Talk 'N Text Tropang Texters	9	4	.692	—	Finals
2	Petron Blaze Boosters	8	5	.615 (Note: Head-to-head differential: Petron +13, Alaska +6, Barangay Ginebra −19)	1	Finals
3	Alaska Aces	8	5	.615	1	
4	Barangay Ginebra Kings	8	5	.615	1	
5	Rain or Shine Elasto Painters	6	7	.462	3	
6	B-Meg Derby Ace Llamados	5	8	.385	4	

Source: PBA.ph
Notes:

Semifinal round standings
Pos	Team	W	L
1	Petron Blaze Boosters	3 (Note: Head-to-head differential: Petron +30, Talk 'N Text +15, Barangay Ginebra −16, Alaska −29)	2
2	Talk 'N Text Tropang Texters	3	2
3	Barangay Ginebra Kings	3	2
4	Alaska Aces	3	2
5	Rain or Shine Elasto Painters	2	3
6	B-Meg Derby Ace Llamados	1	4

Source: PBA.ph

== Transactions ==
=== Pre-season ===
August 29, 2010	To Alaska 2010 first round pick (Elmer Espiritu)	To Talk 'N Text Larry Fonacier
August 29, 2010	To Alaska 2011 2nd round pick	To Rain or Shine 2010 second round pick (RJ Jazul)
August 29, 2010	To Alaska Bonbon Custodio	To Meralco 2010 first round pick (Shawn Weinstein)

=== Commissioner's Cup ===
February 15, 2010	To Alaska Hans Thiele; Paolo Bugia	To Meralco Reynel Hugnatan

=== Governors Cup ===
May 18, 2011	To Alaska Wesley Gonzales	To Air21 Elmer Espiritu
May 30, 2011	To Alaska Jay-R Reyes; 2011 and 2012 2nd round picks	To Air21 Joe Devance

=== Recruited imports ===
Tournament	Name	Debuted	Last game	Record
Commissioner's Cup	(United States) LD Williams	February 23 (vs. Powerade)	April 13 (vs. Air21)	6-6
Governors Cup	(United States) Jason Forte	June 15 (vs. Talk 'N Text)	August 3 (vs. Rain or Shine)	7-5
