= 2012–13 Barako Bull Energy season =

- Head coach: Bong Ramos
- General manager: Raffy Casyao
- Owners: Energy Food and Drinks Inc. (a Lina Group of Companies subsidiary)

Philippine Cup results
- Record: 4–10 (28.6%)
- Place: 9th
- Playoff finish: Did not qualify

Commissioner's Cup results
- Record: 5–9 (35.7%)
- Place: 9th
- Playoff finish: did not qualify

Governors' Cup results
- Record: 4–5 (44.4%)
- Place: 6th
- Playoff finish: Quarterfinalist (defeated by Meralco in one game)

Barako Bull Energy seasons

The 2012–13 Barako Bull Energy was the 11th season of the franchise in the Philippine Basketball Association (PBA). They were formerly known as Barako Bull Energy Cola in the Philippine Cup and Commissioner's Cup. Finishing with a record of 13–25, they made the playoffs only once during the Governors' Cup.

== Key dates ==
- August 19: The 2012 PBA Draft took place in Robinson's Midtown Mall, Manila.
- September 5: Energy Food & Drinks, Inc., owners of the Barako Bull Energy franchise announced that they will rename their team as the Barako Bull Energy Cola starting this season.
- November 14: Bong Ramos replaces Junel Baculi as the head coach for the Barako Bull Energy Cola

== Draft picks ==
Round	Pick	Player	Position	Nationality	College
2	2	Dave Marcelo	F/C	Philippines	San Beda
2	5	Lester Alvarez	G	Philippines	Adamson
2	6	Emman Monfort	G	Philippines	Ateneo de Manila
2	8	Woody Co	F	Philippines	State
3	3	Ryan Boado	G	United States	Houston
4	1	Kokoy Hermosisima	G	Philippines	National

== Roster ==
2012–13 Barako Bull Energy roster
Players
Coaches

Pos.	#	POB	Name	Height	Weight	DOB (YYYY–MM–DD)	From
PG	1	(Philippines)	Celino Cruz	5 ft 9 in (1.75 m)	170 lb (77 kg)		Far Eastern
C	4	(United States)	Dorian Peña	6 ft 6 in (1.98 m)	235 lb (107 kg)		Coppin State
G	5	(United States)	Shawn Weinstein	6 ft 1 in (1.85 m)	186 lb (84 kg)		St. Edward's
PG	6	(Philippines)	Emman Monfort	5 ft 7 in (1.70 m)	132 lb (60 kg)		Ateneo
G/F	7	(Philippines)	JC Intal	6 ft 4 in (1.93 m)	195 lb (88 kg)		Ateneo
G	8	(Philippines)	Ronjay Buenafe	6 ft 0.5 in (1.84 m)	200 lb (91 kg)		Emilio Aguinaldo
F/C	10	(Philippines)	Dave Marcelo (R)	6 ft 5 in (1.96 m)	227 lb (103 kg)		San Beda
F/C	14	(Philippines)	Enrico Villanueva	6 ft 5 in (1.96 m)	230 lb (104 kg)		Ateneo
F/C	15	(Philippines)	Gilbert Bulawan	6 ft 4 in (1.93 m)	195 lb (88 kg)		San Sebastian
F	32	(United States)	Keith Jensen (R)	6 ft 4 in (1.93 m)	185 lb (84 kg)		NYU
PF	42	(United States)	Danny Seigle	6 ft 7 in (2.01 m)	205 lb (93 kg)		Wagner
G/F	45	(Philippines)	Elmer Espiritu	6 ft 4 in (1.93 m)	185 lb (84 kg)		UE
G	80	(Philippines)	Mark Macapagal	6 ft 2 in (1.88 m)	185 lb (84 kg)		San Sebastian
C	88	(Australia)	Mick Pennisi	6 ft 9 in (2.06 m)	235 lb (107 kg)		Eastern Michigan

Head coach

- (Philippines) Bong Ramos (Mapúa)

Assistant coach(es)

- (Serbia) Rajko Toroman
- (Philippines) Leo Angelo Pujante
- (Philippines) Jonas Jaime Mendoza

Team manager

- (Philippines) Raffy Casyao

Legend

- (C) Team captain
- (CI) Commissioner's Cup Import
- (GI) Governors' Cup Import
- (EI) EASL Import
- (DP) Unsigned draft pick
- (FA) Free agent
- (IN) Inactive
- (S) Suspended
- (R) Rookie
- Injured

Roster

== Philippine Cup ==
=== Eliminations ===
==== Standings ====
Pos	Team	W	L	PCT	GB	Qualification
1	Talk 'N Text Tropang Texters	12	2	.857	—	Twice-to-beat in the quarterfinals
2	San Mig Coffee Mixers	10	4	.714	2	Twice-to-beat in the quarterfinals
3	Rain or Shine Elasto Painters	9	5	.643	3	Best-of-three quarterfinals
4	Meralco Bolts	8	6	.571 (Note: Head-to-head record: Alaska 1–1 Meralco (Meralco +4))	4	Best-of-three quarterfinals
5	Alaska Aces	8	6	.571	4	Best-of-three quarterfinals
6	Barangay Ginebra San Miguel	7	7	.500	5	Best-of-three quarterfinals
7	Petron Blaze Boosters	6	8	.429	6	Twice-to-win in the quarterfinals
8	Air21 Express	5	9	.357	7	Twice-to-win in the quarterfinals
9	Barako Bull Energy Cola	4	10	.286	8	
10	GlobalPort Batang Pier	1	13	.071	11	

Source: PBA.ph

==== Game log ====
2013 PBA Philippine Cup game log
October

Game	Date	Opponent	Score	High points	High rebounds	High assists	Location Attendance	Record	
1	October 3	Air21	90–87	Tubid (19)	Villanueva (14)	Anthony (5)	Smart Araneta Coliseum	1–0	Boxscores
2	October 10	Petron Blaze	89–98	Urbiztondo (17)	Kramer, Anthony (10)	Josh Urbiztondo (7)	Smart Araneta Coliseum	1–1	Boxscores
3	October 14	Alaska	86–102	Villanueva (22)	Villanueva (17)	Urbiztondo (5)	Smart Araneta Coliseum	1–2	Boxscores
4	October 19	Barangay Ginebra	92–82	Anthony (21)	Villanueva (8)	Urbiztondo, Villanueva (4)	Smart Araneta Coliseum	2–2	Boxscores
5	October 24	Talk 'N Text	76–79	Villanueva (16)	Villanueva, Kramer (7)	Najorda, Urbiztondo (5)	Smart Araneta Coliseum	2–3	Boxscores
6	October 28	San Mig Coffee	91–92	Tubid (17)	Pennisi (9)	Urbiztondo (8)	Smart Araneta Coliseum	2–4	Boxscores
7	October 31	Meralco	86–99	Kramer, Urbiztondo (14)	Villanueva (11)	Tubid (4)	Smart Araneta Coliseum	2–5	Boxscores

November

Game	Date	Opponent	Score	High points	High rebounds	High assists	Location Attendance	Record	
8	November 4	GlobalPort	95–94	Tubid (19)	Anthony (13)	Urbiztondo (5)	Smart Araneta Coliseum	3–5	Boxscore
9	November 9	Air21	85–86	Tubid (24)	Anthony (12)	Urbiztondo, Anthony, Villanueva (4)	Cuneta Astrodome	3–6	Boxscore
10	November 16	San Mig Coffee	73–93	Tubid (17)	Ballesteros (9)	Yap (4)	Ynares Center	3–7	Boxscore
11	November 24	Petron Blaze	83–93	Seigle (16)	Kramer (21)	Urbiztondo (4)	Lucena City	3–8	Boxscore
12	November 30	Meralco	73–85	Tubid (20)	Kramer (18)	Cruz (4)	Smart Araneta Coliseum	3–9	Boxscore

December

Game	Date	Opponent	Score	High points	High rebounds	High assists	Location Attendance	Record	
13	December 2	Barangay Ginebra	83–79	Tubid (18)	Kramer (22)	Yap (5)	Smart Araneta Coliseum	4–9	Boxscore
14	December 7	Rain or Shine	101–116	Seigle (21)	Kramer (13)	Anthony (5)	Mall of Asia Arena	4–10	Boxscore

2012–13 schedule

== Commissioner's Cup ==
=== Eliminations ===
==== Standings ====
Pos	Team	W	L	PCT	GB	Qualification
1	Alaska Aces	11	3	.786	—	Twice-to-beat in the quarterfinals
2	Rain or Shine Elasto Painters	9	5	.643	2	Twice-to-beat in the quarterfinals
3	Petron Blaze Boosters	8	6	.571 (Note: Head-to-head record: Petron 2–0 San Mig)	3	Best-of-three quarterfinals
4	San Mig Coffee Mixers	8	6	.571	3	Best-of-three quarterfinals
5	Meralco Bolts	7	7	.500 (Note: Head-to-head quotient: Meralco 1.01, TNT 1.00, Barangay Ginebra 0.99)	4	Best-of-three quarterfinals
6	Talk 'N Text Tropang Texters	7	7	.500	4	Best-of-three quarterfinals
7	Barangay Ginebra San Miguel	7	7	.500	4	Twice-to-win in the quarterfinals
8	Air21 Express	6	8	.429	5	Twice-to-win in the quarterfinals
9	Barako Bull Energy Cola	5	9	.357	6	
10	GlobalPort Batang Pier	2	12	.143	9	

Source: PBA.ph

==== Game log ====
2013 PBA Commissioner's Cup game log
February

Game	Date	Opponent	Score	High points	High rebounds	High assists	Location Attendance	Record	
1	February 8	San Mig Coffee	79–75	Brock (18)	Brock (12)	J. Villanueva (5)	Smart Araneta Coliseum	1–0	boxscore
2	February 10	GlobalPort	98–88 (OT)	Brock (25)	Brock (18)	J. Villanueva (6)	Smart Araneta Coliseum	2–0	boxscore
3	February 17	Alaska	73–77	Urbiztondo (15)	Brock (15)	J. Villanueva (4)	Smart Araneta Coliseum	2–1	boxscore
4	February 22	Air21	91–86	Brock (23)	Brock (15)	Urbiztondo (5)	Mall of Asia Arena	3–1	boxscore
5	February 27	Barangay Ginebra	72–93	Brock, Urbiztondo (16)	Brock (14)	Urbiztondo (6)	Smart Araneta Coliseum	3–2	boxscore

March

Game	Date	Opponent	Score	High points	High rebounds	High assists	Location Attendance	Record	
6	March 3	Petron Blaze	78–91	Brock (20)	Brock (24)	J. Villanueva (5)	Smart Araneta Coliseum	3–3	boxscore
7	March 9	Talk 'N Text	98–101	Pennisi (19)	Brock (12)	Urbiztondo (7)	Legaspi City, Albay	3–4	boxscore
8	March 13	Meralco					Smart Araneta Coliseum		
9	March 20	Rain or Shine					Smart Araneta Coliseum		
10	March 24	Barangay Ginebra					Smart Araneta Coliseum		
11	March 31	San Mig Coffee					Mall of Asia Arena		

April

Game	Date	Opponent	Score	High points	High rebounds	High assists	Location Attendance	Record
12	April 7	Petron Blaze					Smart Araneta Coliseum	
13	April 12	Rain or Shine					Smart Araneta Coliseum	
14	April 14	GlobalPort					Mall of Asia Arena	

2012–13 schedule

== Governors' Cup ==
=== Eliminations ===
==== Standings ====
Pos	Team	W	L	PCT	GB	Qualification
1	Petron Blaze Boosters	8	1	.889	—	Twice-to-beat in the quarterfinals
2	San Mig Coffee Mixers	6	3	.667	2	Twice-to-beat in the quarterfinals
3	Meralco Bolts	5	4	.556 (Note: Head-to-head record: Meralco 1–0 Rain or Shine)	3	Twice-to-beat in the quarterfinals
4	Rain or Shine Elasto Painters	5	4	.556	3	Twice-to-beat in the quarterfinals
5	GlobalPort Batang Pier	4	5	.444 (Note: Head-to-head quotient: GlobalPort 1.01, Barako Bull 1.00, Alaska 0.99)	4	Twice-to-win in the quarterfinals
6	Barako Bull Energy	4	5	.444	4	Twice-to-win in the quarterfinals
7	Alaska Aces	4	5	.444	4	Twice-to-win in the quarterfinals
8	Barangay Ginebra San Miguel	3	6	.333 (Note: Head-to-head quotient: Talk 'N Text 1.05, Barangay Ginebra 1.00, Air21 0.96; eighth seed playoff: Barangay Ginebra 110–102 Talk 'N Text)	5	Twice-to-win in the quarterfinals
9	Talk 'N Text Tropang Texters	3	6	.333	5	
10	Air21 Express	3	6	.333	5	

Source: PBA.ph

== Transactions ==
=== Trades ===
==== Pre-season ====
August 20, 2012	To Barako Bull Sean Anthony	To B-Meg 2012 1st-round pick (Aldrech Ramos)

August 31, 2012	To Barako Bull Enrico Villanueva	To Barangay Ginebra Willie Miller
September 11, 2012	To Barako Bull Jason Ballesteros	To Meralco Carlo Sharma; Sunday Salvacion
September 21, 2012	To Barako Bull Josh Urbiztondo	To San Mig Coffee 2013 1st-round pick Wesley Gonzales

==== Commissioner's Cup ====
January 22, 2013	To Barako Bull Alex Mallari; Jojo Duncil; 2014 1st-round pick	To Petron Blaze Ronald Tubid

January 22, 2013	To Barako Bull JC Intal; Jonas Villanueva; Aldrech Ramos	To San Mig Coffee Mixers Alex Mallari; Leo Najorda; Lester Alvarez; 2014 1st-round pick (originally from Petron Blaze)

January 22, 2013	To Barako Bull Mac Baracael	To Alaska Aldrech Ramos

January 22, 2013	To Barako Bull Allein Maliksi	To Barangay Ginebra Mac Baracael

April 18, 2013	To Barako Bull Keith Jensen; 2015 2nd-round pick (from GlobalPort)	To Barangay Ginebra Josh Urbiztondo

June 10, 2013	To Barako Bull Jared Dillinger	To Talk 'N Text Sean Anthony

June 10, 2013	To Barako Bull Ronjay Buenafe; Gilbert Bulawan	To Meralco Jared Dillinger; Don Allado

June 10, 2013	To Barako Bull Elmer Espiritu	To Barangay Ginebra 2013 2nd-round pick (from Talk 'N Text)

August 12, 2013	To Barako Bull Dorian Peña; 2013 2nd-round pick (from Barangay Ginebra)	To Petron Blaze Doug Kramer

=== Governors' Cup ===
August 12, 2013	To Barako Bull Wesley Gonzales; Chris Pacana; 2017 2nd-round pick	To San Mig Coffee Allein Maliksi

=== Recruited imports ===
Tournament	Name	Debuted	Last game	Record
Commissioner's Cup	Evan Brock	February 8 (vs. San Mig Coffee)	March 31 (vs. San Mig Coffee)	4–7
Commissioner's Cup	DJ Mbenga	April 7 (vs. Petron)	April 14 (vs. GlobalPort)	1–2
Governors' Cup	Mike Singletary	August 15 (vs. Talk 'N Text)	September 25 (vs. Meralco)	4–6
