= 2010–11 Air21 Express season =

- Head coach: Yeng Guiao (October – December 2010); Bong Ramos (January 2011–present)
- Owner: Airfreight 2100, Inc.

Philippine Cup results
- Record: 6–8 (42.9%)
- Place: 7th
- Playoff finish: Quarter-finalist (eliminated by San Miguel)

Commissioner's Cup results
- Record: 5–4 (55.6%)
- Place: 4th
- Playoff finish: Semifinalist (eliminated by Talk 'N Text, 3-0)

Governors Cup results
- Record: 0–8 (0%)
- Place: 8th
- Playoff finish: did not qualify

Air21 Express seasons

The 2010–11 Air21 Express season was the 9th season of the franchise in the Philippine Basketball Association (PBA).

== Key dates ==
- August 29: The 2010 PBA Draft took place in Fort Bonifacio, Taguig.

== Draft picks ==
Round	Pick	Player	Height	Position	Nationality	College
1	1	Nonoy Baclao	6 ft. 5 in.	Power forward	Philippines	Ateneo
1	2	Rabeh Al-Hussaini	6 ft. 7 in.	Center	Philippines	Ateneo
1	3	Rey Guevarra	6 ft. 3 in.	Shooting guard	Philippines	Letran
1	6	Sean Anthony	6 ft. 4 in.	Power forward	Philippines	McGill

== Roster ==
2010–11 Air21 Express roster
Players

Pos.	#	POB	Name	Height	Weight	DOB (YYYY–MM–DD)	From
PG	1	(Philippines)	Lou Gatumbato (R)	5 ft 10 in (1.78 m)	185 lb (84 kg)		St. Benilde
C	4	(United States)	Dorian Peña (injured)	6 ft 6 in (1.98 m)	235 lb (107 kg)		Coppin State
F/C	5	(Philippines)	Jondan Salvador	6 ft 4 in (1.93 m)	210 lb (95 kg)		St. Benilde
G	8	(Philippines)	Reed Juntilla	6 ft 2 in (1.88 m)	180 lb (82 kg)		Visayas
G	11	(Philippines)	Willie Miller	5 ft 11 in (1.80 m)	180 lb (82 kg)		Letran
F/C	13	(Philippines)	Carlo Sharma	6 ft 6 in (1.98 m)	220 lb (100 kg)		De La Salle
F	14	(Philippines)	Leo Najorda	6 ft 3 in (1.91 m)	190 lb (86 kg)		San Sebastian
PG	16	(Philippines)	Paul Artadi	5 ft 9 in (1.75 m)	170 lb (77 kg)		UE
PG	18	(Philippines)	Marcy Arellano	5 ft 9 in (1.75 m)	175 lb (79 kg)		UE
PG	19	(Philippines)	Wynne Arboleda (C)	5 ft 11 in (1.80 m)	180 lb (82 kg)		MLQU
G	24	(Philippines)	Dondon Hontiveros	6 ft 2 in (1.88 m)	180 lb (82 kg)		Cebu
G	25	(Philippines)	Leo Avenido	5 ft 11 in (1.80 m)	180 lb (82 kg)		Far Eastern
G/F	34	(Philippines)	Patrick Cabahug (R)	6 ft 2 in (1.88 m)	165 lb (75 kg)		Adamson
SF	42	(United States)	Danny Seigle	6 ft 6 in (1.98 m)	205 lb (93 kg)		Wagner
SF	45	(Philippines)	Elmer Espiritu (R)	6 ft 3 in (1.91 m)	185 lb (84 kg)		UE

Coaches
Head coach
- (Philippines) Bong Ramos (Mapúa)
Assistant(s)
- (Philippines) Roehl Nadurata (UE)
- (Philippines) Sandy Arespacochaga (Ateneo)
- (Philippines) Johnny Tam
- (Philippines) Arsenio Dysanco

Legend
- (DP) Unsigned draft pick
- (FA) Free agent
- (S) Suspended
- (I) Import
- Injured

== Philippine Cup ==
=== Eliminations ===
==== Standings ====
Pos	Team	W	L	PCT	GB	Qualification
1	Talk 'N Text Tropang Texters	11	3	.786 (Note: Head-to-head record: San Miguel 1–1 Talk 'N Text (San Miguel +9))	—	Twice-to-beat in the quarterfinals
2	San Miguel Beermen	11	3	.786	—	Twice-to-beat in the quarterfinals
3	Barangay Ginebra Kings	10	4	.714	1	Best-of-three quarterfinals
4	B-Meg Derby Ace Llamados	7	7	.500 (Note: Head-to-head differential: B-Meg +23, Meralco −11, Alaska −12)	4	Best-of-three quarterfinals
5	Meralco Bolts	7	7	.500	4	Best-of-three quarterfinals
6	Alaska Aces	7	7	.500	4	Best-of-three quarterfinals
7	Air21 Express	6	8	.429	5	Twice-to-win in the quarterfinals
8	Rain or Shine Elasto Painters	5	9	.357	6	Twice-to-win in the quarterfinals
9	Powerade Tigers	3	11	.214 (Note: Head-to-head record: Barako Bull 1–0 Powerade)	8	
10	Barako Bull Energy Boosters	3	11	.214	8	

Source: PBA.ph

== Commissioner's Cup ==
=== Eliminations ===
==== Standings ====
Pos	Team	W	L	PCT	GB	Qualification
1	Talk 'N Text Tropang Texters	8	1	.889	—	Advance to semifinals
2	Smart Gilas (G)	7	2	.778	1	Advance to semifinals
3	Barangay Ginebra Kings	5	4	.556 (Note: Head-to-head differential: Barangay Ginebra +12, Air21 −4, Alaska −8)	3	Advance to quarterfinals
4	Air21 Express	5	4	.556	3	Advance to quarterfinals
5	Alaska Aces	5	4	.556	3	Advance to quarterfinals
6	Rain or Shine Elasto Painters	4	5	.444 (Note: Head-to-head record: Rain or Shine 1–0 B-Meg)	4	Advance to quarterfinals
7	B-Meg Derby Ace Llamados	4	5	.444	4	
8	Meralco Bolts	3	6	.333	5	
9	Powerade Tigers	2	7	.222 (Note: Head-to-head record: Powerade 1–0 San Miguel)	6	
10	San Miguel Beermen	2	7	.222	6	

Source: PBA.ph
(G) Guests

== Governors Cup ==
=== Eliminations ===
==== Standings ====
Pos	Team	W	L	PCT	GB	Qualification
1	Talk 'N Text Tropang Texters	6	2	.750	—	Semifinal round
2	Petron Blaze Boosters	5	3	.625 (Note: Head-to-head differential: Petron +10, Alaska +5, Barangay Ginebra −15)	1	Semifinal round
3	Alaska Aces	5	3	.625	1	Semifinal round
4	Barangay Ginebra Kings	5	3	.625	1	Semifinal round
5	Rain or Shine Elasto Painters	4	4	.500 (Note: Head-to-head differential: Rain or Shine +11, B-Meg 0, Powerade −11)	2	Semifinal round
6	B-Meg Derby Ace Llamados	4	4	.500	2	Semifinal round
7	Powerade Tigers	4	4	.500	2	
8	Meralco Bolts	3	5	.375	3	
9	Air21 Express	0	8	.000	6	

Source: PBA.ph

== Transactions ==
=== Pre-season ===
==== Trades ====
August 8, 2010	To Air21 Doug Kramer	To Rain or Shine Marcy Arellano

August 20, 2010	To Air21 J.R. Quiñahan (from Talk 'N Text)	To Meralco Beau Belga (from Air21)	To Talk 'N Text Ali Peek (from Meralco)
August 20, 2010	To Air21 Josh Urbiztondo (from Meralco); 2010 1st-round pick (from Meralco)	To Meralco Mark Cardona (from Talk 'N Text)	To Talk 'N Text Ali Peek (from Meralco); 2010 1st-round pick (from Air21)

August 29, 2010	To Air21 2011 2nd-round pick 2012 1st-round pick	To Powerade 2010 2nd-round pick (Jai Reyes); Sean Anthony; Ren-Ren Ritualo

September 3, 2010	To Air21 2014 1st-round pick (from B-Meg Derby Ace)	To B-Meg Derby Ace Jonas Villanueva (from San Miguel); 2013 2nd-round pick (from Air21)	To San Miguel Paul Artadi (from B-Meg Derby Ace)

September 3, 2010	To Air21 future draft pick	To Barangay Ginebra Billy Mamaril

==== Free agents ====
===== Subtractions =====
Player	Signed	New team
Rich Alvarez	September 17, 2010	Talk 'N Text

=== Philippine Cup ===
==== Trades ====
January 20, 2011
To Air21

Jay-R Reyes (from Rain or Shine)
Reed Juntilla (from Meralco)
2011 and 2013 2nd-round picks (from Meralco)
To Meralco

Solomon Mercado (from Rain or Shine)
Paolo Bugia (from Rain or Shine)
Erick Rodriguez (from Air21)

To Rain or Shine

Ronjay Buenafe (from Air21)
Ronnie Matias (from Air21)
Beau Belga (from Meralco)
2011 and 2013 1st-round picks (from Air21)

January 31, 2011	To Air21 2012 second round and 2013 first round picks	To Powerade J.R. Quiñahan

=== Commissioner's Cup ===
==== Trades ====
March 2, 2011	To Air21 Danny Seigle; Dondon Hontiveros; Dorian Peña; Paul Artadi	To San Miguel Nonoy Baclao; Rabeh Al-Hussaini; Rey Guevarra

==== Free agents ====
===== Additions =====
Player	Signed	Former team
Leo Avenido	February 25, 2011	none (Played in ABL)

=== Governors Cup ===
May 18, 2011	To Air21 Elmer Espiritu	To Alaska Wesley Gonzales
May 30, 2011	To Air21 Joe Devance	To Alaska Jay-R Reyes; 2011 and 2012 2nd-round picks
June 3, 2011	To Air21 KG Canaleta; Jondan Salvador	To B-Meg Joe Devance
July 18, 2011	To Air21 Willie Miller	To Barangay Ginebra KG Canaleta; 2012 1st-round pick (acquired from Powerade)

=== Recruited imports ===
Tournament	Name	Debuted	Last game	Record
Commissioner's Cup	(United States) Geremy Robinson	February 25 (vs. San Miguel)	March 5 (vs. Talk 'N Text)	1–2
Commissioner's Cup	(Libya) Alpha Bangura	March 9 (vs. Smart Gilas)	April 20 (vs. Talk 'N Text)	6-6
Governors Cup	(Libya) Alpha Bangura	June 15 (vs. Rain or Shine)	July 17 (vs. Talk 'N Text)	0–8
