= Dennis Daa =

Filipino basketball player

Personal information
- Born: July 5, 1979 (age 47) Tacloban, Leyte, Philippines
- Listed height: 6 ft 5 in (1.96 m)
- Listed weight: 200 lb (91 kg)

Career information
- College: Las Piñas College
- PBA draft: 2006: Undrafted
- Drafted by: Sta. Lucia Realtors
- Playing career: 2007–2021
- Position: Power forward / center

Career history
- 2007–2010: Sta. Lucia Realtors
- 2010: Meralco Bolts
- 2010–2011: Barako Bull Energy Boosters
- 2011–2012: Shopinas.com Clickers
- 2018–2021: Basilan Steel / Basilan Peace Riders

Dennis M. Daa (born July 5, 1979) is a Filipino former professional basketball player. Daa played five seasons in the Philippine Basketball Association (PBA), and had a stint with Basilan in the Maharlika Pilipinas Basketball League (MPBL).

Daa was a member of the Meralco Bolts first PBA team in 2010. He was acquired by the Sta. Lucia Realtors in 2007 through free agency.

In 2010, he was traded to the Barako Bull Energy Boosters in exchange for undrafted rookie Hans Thiele.

In 2011, he played for the Shopinas Clickers.

== PBA career statistics ==
Legend
GP	Games played	MPG	Minutes per game
FG%	Field-goal percentage	3P%	3-point field-goal percentage	FT%	Free-throw percentage
RPG	Rebounds per game	APG	Assists per game	SPG	Steals per game
BPG	Blocks per game	PPG	Points per game	**Bold**	Career high

=== Season-by-season averages ===
Year	Team	GP	MPG	FG%	3P%	FT%	RPG	APG	SPG	BPG	PPG
2007–08	Sta. Lucia	**43**	11.7	**.435**	**.125**	.683	2.6	.2	.1	.1	3.5
2008–09	Sta. Lucia	38	8.6	.317	.000	.640	1.4	.3	**.2**	.1	1.8
2009–10	Sta. Lucia	28	12.6	.390	.000	.672	2.9	.2	**.2**	.0	5.3
2010–11	Meralco	12	**21.6**	.338	.000	**.737**	**5.0**	**.4**	**.2**	**.2**	**6.2**
2010–11	Barako Bull	12	**21.6**	.338	.000	**.737**	**5.0**	**.4**	**.2**	**.2**	**6.2**
2011–12	Shopinas.com / Air21	15	7.5	.340	—	.722	1.9	.2	.1	.0	3.0
Career		136	11.4	.378	.091	.688	2.5	.3	.2	.1	3.6
