= 2010–11 Rain or Shine Elasto Painters season =

- Head coach: Caloy Garcia (October – December 2010); Yeng Guiao (January 2011 – 2016)
- Owners: Asian Coatings Philippines, Inc.

Philippine Cup results
- Record: 5–9 (35.7%)
- Place: 8th
- Playoff finish: Quarter-finalist (eliminated by Talk 'N Text)

Commissioner's Cup results
- Record: 4–5 (44.4%)
- Place: 6th
- Playoff finish: Quarter-finalist (eliminated by Barangay Ginebra, 2-1)

Governors Cup results
- Record: 6–7 (46.2%)
- Place: 5th
- Playoff finish: Semifinalist

Rain or Shine Elasto Painters seasons

The 2010–11 Rain or Shine Elasto Painters season was the 5th season of the franchise in the Philippine Basketball Association (PBA).

== Key dates ==
- August 29: The 2010 PBA Draft took place in Market! Market!, Fort Bonifacio, Taguig.

== Draft picks ==
Round	Pick	Player	Height	Position	Nationality	College
1	5	Josh Vanlandingham	6 ft. 4 in.	Shooting guard	United States	Pacific Lutheran
2	15	RJ Jazul	5 ft. 9 in.	Point guard	Philippines	Letran

== Roster ==
2010–11 Rain or Shine Elasto Painters roster
Players
Coaches

Pos.	#	POB	Name	Height	Weight	DOB (YYYY–MM–DD)	From
G	1	(Philippines)	Jonathan Uyloan (R)	6 ft 0 in (1.83 m)	185 lb (84 kg)		Golden West
SF	3	(Philippines)	Ronnie Matias	6 ft 4 in (1.93 m)	184 lb (83 kg)		Manila
PF	5	(Philippines)	Larry Rodriguez	6 ft 4 in (1.93 m)	200 lb (91 kg)		PMI
SF	6	(Philippines)	Jireh Ibañes	6 ft 2 in (1.88 m)	182 lb (83 kg)		UP Diliman
G	8	(Philippines)	Ronjay Buenafe	6 ft 2 in (1.88 m)	200 lb (91 kg)		Emilio Aguinaldo
G/F	10	(United States)	Gabe Norwood	6 ft 5 in (1.96 m)	210 lb (95 kg)		George Mason
PG	11	(Philippines)	Tyrone Tang	5 ft 10 in (1.78 m)	155 lb (70 kg)		De La Salle
G/F	16	(Philippines)	Jeff Chan	6 ft 3 in (1.91 m)	185 lb (84 kg)		Far Eastern
SG	18	(Philippines)	Ryan Araña	6 ft 2 in (1.88 m)	180 lb (82 kg)		De La Salle
F/C	20	(Philippines)	Jervy Cruz	6 ft 4 in (1.93 m)	220 lb (100 kg)		UST
G/F	22	(United States)	Josh Vanlandingham (R)	6 ft 4 in (1.93 m)	195 lb (88 kg)		Pacific Lutheran
PG	25	(Philippines)	RJ Jazul (R)	5 ft 11 in (1.80 m)	170 lb (77 kg)		Letran
C	30	(Philippines)	Beau Belga	6 ft 6 in (1.98 m)	195 lb (88 kg)		Philippine Christian
F/C	44	(Philippines)	Doug Kramer	6 ft 4 in (1.93 m)	210 lb (95 kg)		Ateneo
PF	55	(Philippines)	John Ferriols	6 ft 4 in (1.93 m)	205 lb (93 kg)		USJ–R

Head coach

- (Philippines) Yeng Guiao (UP Diliman)

Assistant coach(es)

- (Philippines) Caloy Garcia (St. Benilde)
- (Philippines) Mike Buendia
- (Philippines) Jay Legacion
- (Philippines) Matthew Makalintal

Legend

- (C) Team captain
- (CI) Commissioner's Cup Import
- (GI) Governors' Cup Import
- (EI) EASL Import
- (DP) Unsigned draft pick
- (FA) Free agent
- (IN) Inactive
- (S) Suspended
- (R) Rookie
- Injured

== Philippine Cup ==
=== Eliminations ===
==== Standings ====
Pos	Team	W	L	PCT	GB	Qualification
1	Talk 'N Text Tropang Texters	11	3	.786 (Note: Head-to-head record: San Miguel 1–1 Talk 'N Text (San Miguel +9))	—	Twice-to-beat in the quarterfinals
2	San Miguel Beermen	11	3	.786	—	Twice-to-beat in the quarterfinals
3	Barangay Ginebra Kings	10	4	.714	1	Best-of-three quarterfinals
4	B-Meg Derby Ace Llamados	7	7	.500 (Note: Head-to-head differential: B-Meg +23, Meralco −11, Alaska −12)	4	Best-of-three quarterfinals
5	Meralco Bolts	7	7	.500	4	Best-of-three quarterfinals
6	Alaska Aces	7	7	.500	4	Best-of-three quarterfinals
7	Air21 Express	6	8	.429	5	Twice-to-win in the quarterfinals
8	Rain or Shine Elasto Painters	5	9	.357	6	Twice-to-win in the quarterfinals
9	Powerade Tigers	3	11	.214 (Note: Head-to-head record: Barako Bull 1–0 Powerade)	8	
10	Barako Bull Energy Boosters	3	11	.214	8	

Source: PBA.ph

== Commissioner's Cup ==
=== Eliminations ===
==== Standings ====
Pos	Team	W	L	PCT	GB	Qualification
1	Talk 'N Text Tropang Texters	8	1	.889	—	Advance to semifinals
2	Smart Gilas (G)	7	2	.778	1	Advance to semifinals
3	Barangay Ginebra Kings	5	4	.556 (Note: Head-to-head differential: Barangay Ginebra +12, Air21 −4, Alaska −8)	3	Advance to quarterfinals
4	Air21 Express	5	4	.556	3	Advance to quarterfinals
5	Alaska Aces	5	4	.556	3	Advance to quarterfinals
6	Rain or Shine Elasto Painters	4	5	.444 (Note: Head-to-head record: Rain or Shine 1–0 B-Meg)	4	Advance to quarterfinals
7	B-Meg Derby Ace Llamados	4	5	.444	4	
8	Meralco Bolts	3	6	.333	5	
9	Powerade Tigers	2	7	.222 (Note: Head-to-head record: Powerade 1–0 San Miguel)	6	
10	San Miguel Beermen	2	7	.222	6	

Source: PBA.ph
(G) Guests

== Governors Cup ==
=== Eliminations ===
==== Standings ====
Pos	Team	W	L	PCT	GB	Qualification
1	Talk 'N Text Tropang Texters	6	2	.750	—	Semifinal round
2	Petron Blaze Boosters	5	3	.625 (Note: Head-to-head differential: Petron +10, Alaska +5, Barangay Ginebra −15)	1	Semifinal round
3	Alaska Aces	5	3	.625	1	Semifinal round
4	Barangay Ginebra Kings	5	3	.625	1	Semifinal round
5	Rain or Shine Elasto Painters	4	4	.500 (Note: Head-to-head differential: Rain or Shine +11, B-Meg 0, Powerade −11)	2	Semifinal round
6	B-Meg Derby Ace Llamados	4	4	.500	2	Semifinal round
7	Powerade Tigers	4	4	.500	2	
8	Meralco Bolts	3	5	.375	3	
9	Air21 Express	0	8	.000	6	

Source: PBA.ph

=== Semifinals ===
==== Standings ====
Overall standings
Pos	Team	W	L	PCT	GB	Qualification
1	Talk 'N Text Tropang Texters	9	4	.692	—	Finals
2	Petron Blaze Boosters	8	5	.615 (Note: Head-to-head differential: Petron +13, Alaska +6, Barangay Ginebra −19)	1	Finals
3	Alaska Aces	8	5	.615	1	
4	Barangay Ginebra Kings	8	5	.615	1	
5	Rain or Shine Elasto Painters	6	7	.462	3	
6	B-Meg Derby Ace Llamados	5	8	.385	4	

Source: PBA.ph
Notes:

Semifinal round standings
Pos	Team	W	L
1	Petron Blaze Boosters	3 (Note: Head-to-head differential: Petron +30, Talk 'N Text +15, Barangay Ginebra −16, Alaska −29)	2
2	Talk 'N Text Tropang Texters	3	2
3	Barangay Ginebra Kings	3	2
4	Alaska Aces	3	2
5	Rain or Shine Elasto Painters	2	3
6	B-Meg Derby Ace Llamados	1	4

Source: PBA.ph

== Transactions ==
=== Pre-season ===
==== Trades ====
August 8, 2010	To Rain or Shine Marcy Arellano	To Air21 Doug Kramer
August 29, 2010	To Rain or Shine 2010 second round pick (RJ Jazul)	To Alaska 2011 2nd round pick
September 16, 2010	To Rain or Shine Larry Rodriguez	To Powerade Eddie Laure; 2011 1st round pick

==== Free agents ====
===== Additions =====
Player	Signed	Former team
John Ferriols	September 4, 2010	Barangay Ginebra
Paolo Bugia	September 4, 2010	Barangay Ginebra

===== Subtractions =====
Player	Signed	Former team
Mark Telan	September 17, 2010	waived

=== Philippine Cup ===
==== Trades ====
January 20, 2011
To Rain or Shine

Ronjay Buenafe (from Air21)
Ronnie Matias (from Air21)
Beau Belga (from Meralco)
2011 and 2013 1st round picks (from Air21)
To Air21

Jay-R Reyes (from Rain or Shine)
Reed Juntilla (from Meralco)
2011 and 2013 2nd round picks (from Meralco)
To Meralco

Solomon Mercado (from Rain or Shine)
Paolo Bugia (from Rain or Shine)
Erick Rodriguez (from Air21)

=== Imports recruited ===
Team	Name	Debuted	Last game	Record
Commissioner's Cup	(United States) Hassan Adams	February 23 (vs. B-Meg Derby Ace)	April 13 (vs. Barangay Ginebra)	5–7
Governors Cup	(United States) Arizona Reid	June 11 (vs. B-Meg)	August 5 (vs. Barangay Ginebra)	6–7
