= 2010–11 Barangay Ginebra Kings season =

- Head coach: Jong Uichico
- General manager: Samboy Lim
- Owner: Ginebra San Miguel, Inc.

Philippine Cup results
- Record: 10–4 (71.4%)
- Place: 3rd
- Playoff finish: Semifinalist (eliminated by San Miguel, 4-2)

Commissioner's Cup results
- Record: 5–4 (55.6%)
- Place: 3rd
- Playoff finish: Runner-up (def. by Talk 'N Text, 2–4)

Governors Cup results
- Record: 8–5 (61.5%)
- Place: 4th
- Playoff finish: Semifinalist

Barangay Ginebra Kings seasons

The 2010–11 Barangay Ginebra Kings season was the 32nd season of the franchise in the Philippine Basketball Association (PBA).

== Key dates ==
- August 29: The 2010 PBA draft took place in Fort Bonifacio, Taguig.

== Draft picks ==
Round	Pick	Player	Height	Position	Nationality	College
1	7	John Wilson	6 ft. 2 in.	Shooting guard	Philippines	Jose Rizal
1	8	Jimbo Aquino	6 ft. 3 in.	Shooting guard	Philippines	San Sebastian
2	12	Robert Labagala	5 ft. 7 in.	Point guard	Philippines	UE

== Roster ==
2010–11 Barangay Ginebra Kings roster
Players
Coaches

Pos.	#	POB	Name	Height	Weight	DOB (YYYY–MM–DD)	From
PG	21	(Philippines)	Mike Cortez	6 ft 0 in (1.83 m)	180 lb (82 kg)		De La Salle
F/C	2	(Philippines)	Billy Mamaril	6 ft 5 in (1.96 m)	220 lb (100 kg)		Bakersfield
G/F	4	(Philippines)	Jimbo Aquino (R)	6 ft 1 in (1.85 m)	180 lb (82 kg)		San Sebastian
SF	5	(Philippines)	Niño Canaleta	6 ft 5 in (1.96 m)	200 lb (91 kg)		UE
SF	6	(Philippines)	Intal, JC	6 ft 4 in (1.93 m)	195 lb (88 kg)		Ateneo
PG	9	(Philippines)	Robert Labagala (R)	5 ft 9 in (1.75 m)	170 lb (77 kg)		UE
PG	13	(Philippines)	Jayjay Helterbrand	5 ft 11 in (1.80 m)	170 lb (77 kg)		Kentucky State
F/C	18	(Philippines)	Yancy De Ocampo	6 ft 8 in (2.03 m)	220 lb (100 kg)		Saint Francis of Assisi
F/C	23	(Philippines)	Enrico Villanueva (injured)	6 ft 5 in (1.96 m)	210 lb (95 kg)		Ateneo
G/F	24	(Philippines)	John Wilson (R)	6 ft 0 in (1.83 m)	185 lb (84 kg)		José Rizal
F	27	(United States)	Willy Wilson	6 ft 3 in (1.91 m)	200 lb (91 kg)		De La Salle
F/C	30	(United States)	Eric Menk (C)	6 ft 6 in (1.98 m)	220 lb (100 kg)		Lake Superior State
SG	47	(Philippines)	Mark Caguioa	6 ft 0 in (1.83 m)	190 lb (86 kg)		Glendale CC (CA)
G/F	71	(Philippines)	Ronald Tubid	6 ft 1 in (1.85 m)	185 lb (84 kg)		UE
F	73	(Philippines)	Eric Rodriguez	6 ft 4 in (1.93 m)	198 lb (90 kg)		Letran
F	15	(United States)	Nate Brumfield (CI)	6 ft 4 in (1.93 m)	250 lb (113 kg)		Oklahoma Baptist
G	10	(United States)	Curtis Stinson (GI)	6 ft 3 in (1.91 m)	215 lb (98 kg)		Iowa State
G	3	(United States)	Donald Sloan (GI)	6 ft 3 in (1.91 m)	205 lb (93 kg)		Texas A&M

Head coach

- (Philippines) Jong Uichico (De La Salle)

Assistant coach(es)

- (Philippines) Siot Tanquingcen (UST)
- (Philippines) Juno Sauler (De La Salle)
- (Philippines) Allan Caidic (UE)

Legend

- (C) Team captain
- (CI) Commissioner's Cup Import
- (GI) Governors' Cup Import
- (EI) EASL Import
- (DP) Unsigned draft pick
- (FA) Free agent
- (IN) Inactive
- (S) Suspended
- (R) Rookie
- Injured

== Philippine Cup ==
=== Eliminations ===
==== Standings ====
Pos	Team	W	L	PCT	GB	Qualification
1	Talk 'N Text Tropang Texters	11	3	.786 (Note: Head-to-head record: San Miguel 1–1 Talk 'N Text (San Miguel +9))	—	Twice-to-beat in the quarterfinals
2	San Miguel Beermen	11	3	.786	—	Twice-to-beat in the quarterfinals
3	Barangay Ginebra Kings	10	4	.714	1	Best-of-three quarterfinals
4	B-Meg Derby Ace Llamados	7	7	.500 (Note: Head-to-head differential: B-Meg +23, Meralco −11, Alaska −12)	4	Best-of-three quarterfinals
5	Meralco Bolts	7	7	.500	4	Best-of-three quarterfinals
6	Alaska Aces	7	7	.500	4	Best-of-three quarterfinals
7	Air21 Express	6	8	.429	5	Twice-to-win in the quarterfinals
8	Rain or Shine Elasto Painters	5	9	.357	6	Twice-to-win in the quarterfinals
9	Powerade Tigers	3	11	.214 (Note: Head-to-head record: Barako Bull 1–0 Powerade)	8	
10	Barako Bull Energy Boosters	3	11	.214	8	

Source: PBA.ph

== Commissioner's Cup ==
=== Eliminations ===
==== Standings ====
Pos	Team	W	L	PCT	GB	Qualification
1	Talk 'N Text Tropang Texters	8	1	.889	—	Advance to semifinals
2	Smart Gilas (G)	7	2	.778	1	Advance to semifinals
3	Barangay Ginebra Kings	5	4	.556 (Note: Head-to-head differential: Barangay Ginebra +12, Air21 −4, Alaska −8)	3	Advance to quarterfinals
4	Air21 Express	5	4	.556	3	Advance to quarterfinals
5	Alaska Aces	5	4	.556	3	Advance to quarterfinals
6	Rain or Shine Elasto Painters	4	5	.444 (Note: Head-to-head record: Rain or Shine 1–0 B-Meg)	4	Advance to quarterfinals
7	B-Meg Derby Ace Llamados	4	5	.444	4	
8	Meralco Bolts	3	6	.333	5	
9	Powerade Tigers	2	7	.222 (Note: Head-to-head record: Powerade 1–0 San Miguel)	6	
10	San Miguel Beermen	2	7	.222	6	

Source: PBA.ph
(G) Guests

== Governors Cup ==
=== Eliminations ===
==== Standings ====
Pos	Team	W	L	PCT	GB	Qualification
1	Talk 'N Text Tropang Texters	6	2	.750	—	Semifinal round
2	Petron Blaze Boosters	5	3	.625 (Note: Head-to-head differential: Petron +10, Alaska +5, Barangay Ginebra −15)	1	Semifinal round
3	Alaska Aces	5	3	.625	1	Semifinal round
4	Barangay Ginebra Kings	5	3	.625	1	Semifinal round
5	Rain or Shine Elasto Painters	4	4	.500 (Note: Head-to-head differential: Rain or Shine +11, B-Meg 0, Powerade −11)	2	Semifinal round
6	B-Meg Derby Ace Llamados	4	4	.500	2	Semifinal round
7	Powerade Tigers	4	4	.500	2	
8	Meralco Bolts	3	5	.375	3	
9	Air21 Express	0	8	.000	6	

Source: PBA.ph

=== Semifinals ===
==== Standings ====
Overall standings
Pos	Team	W	L	PCT	GB	Qualification
1	Talk 'N Text Tropang Texters	9	4	.692	—	Finals
2	Petron Blaze Boosters	8	5	.615 (Note: Head-to-head differential: Petron +13, Alaska +6, Barangay Ginebra −19)	1	Finals
3	Alaska Aces	8	5	.615	1	
4	Barangay Ginebra Kings	8	5	.615	1	
5	Rain or Shine Elasto Painters	6	7	.462	3	
6	B-Meg Derby Ace Llamados	5	8	.385	4	

Source: PBA.ph
Notes:

Semifinal round standings
Pos	Team	W	L
1	Petron Blaze Boosters	3 (Note: Head-to-head differential: Petron +30, Talk 'N Text +15, Barangay Ginebra −16, Alaska −29)	2
2	Talk 'N Text Tropang Texters	3	2
3	Barangay Ginebra Kings	3	2
4	Alaska Aces	3	2
5	Rain or Shine Elasto Painters	2	3
6	B-Meg Derby Ace Llamados	1	4

Source: PBA.ph

== Transactions ==
=== Pre-season ===
==== Trades ====
September 3, 2010	To Barangay Ginebra Billy Mamaril	To Air21 future draft pick
September 4, 2010	To Barangay Ginebra future draft pick	To Barako Bull Sunday Salvacion

==== Free agents ====
===== Subtractions =====
Player	Signed	New team
John Ferriols	September 4, 2010	waived, signed by Rain or Shine
Paolo Bugia	September 4, 2010	waived, signed by Rain or Shine

=== Governors Cup ===
==== Trades ====
July 18, 2011	To Barangay Ginebra KG Canaleta; 2012 1st round pick (acquired from Powerade)	To Air21 Willie Miller

=== Imports recruited ===
Team	Name	Debuted	Last game	Record
Commissioner's Cup	(United States) Nate Brumfield	February 18 (vs. Meralco)	May 8 (vs. Talk 'N Text)	12-10
Governors Cup	(United States) Curtis Stinson	June 12 (vs. Powerade)	July 1 (vs. Talk 'N Text)	2-2
Governors Cup	(United States) Donald Sloan	July 16 (vs. Alaska)	August 5 (vs. Rain or Shine)	4-3
