= Reed Juntilla =

Filipino basketball player

Personal information
- Born: June 22, 1984 (age 42) Carmen, Cebu, Philippines
- Listed height: 6 ft 2 in (1.88 m)
- Listed weight: 180 lb (82 kg)

Career information
- College: UV
- PBA draft: 2007: Undrafted
- Playing career: 2008–2013; 2018–2022
- Position: Shooting guard / point guard

Career history
- 2008–2010: Barako Bull Energy Boosters
- 2011: Meralco Bolts
- 2011: Air21 Express
- 2011–2012: Philippine Patriots
- 2013: GlobalPort Batang Pier
- 2018: Zamboanga Family's Brand Sardines
- 2019–2020: Bataan Risers
- 2021: ARQ Builders–Lapu-Lapu City Heroes
- 2022: Zamboanga Valientes

Career highlights
- MPBL All-Star (2019)

Reed Friar Juntilla (born June 22, 1984) is a Filipino former professional basketball player.

== Career ==
Juntilla played for Mail and More Comets and Hapee Toothpaste in the Philippine Basketball League. He was eligible for the 2007 PBA draft but no team drafted him. His skills is common to Cyrus Baguio, a slasher and a shooter. He was signed as a free agent by Red Bull in 2008.

After the 2008 PBA Fiesta Conference ended, Juntilla faced possible revocation of his contract for going AWOL. Then-Barako Bull coach Yeng Guiao wanted Juntilla to be waived because of his sudden absence just after signing a two-year contract with the team. After that incident, he has since returned to Barako Bull.

Before the playoffs of the 2010–11 PBA Philippine Cup, he and Mark Isip were traded to Bolts in a three-team, eight-player trade.

His stint with the Bolts was short-lived as he was traded again, this time to the Air21 Express along with Jay-R Reyes.

== PBA career statistics ==
Legend
GP	Games played	MPG	Minutes per game
FG%	Field-goal percentage	3P%	3-point field-goal percentage	FT%	Free-throw percentage
RPG	Rebounds per game	APG	Assists per game	SPG	Steals per game
BPG	Blocks per game	PPG	Points per game	**Bold**	Career high

=== Season-by-season averages ===
Year	Team	GP	MPG	FG%	3P%	FT%	RPG	APG	SPG	BPG	PPG
2007–08	Red Bull	3	16.3	**.556**	.222	.000	2.0	**2.3**	**.7**	**.3**	7.3
2008–09	Red Bull / Barako Bull	14	17.3	.304	.333	**.786**	1.6	2.1	.3	.0	5.9
2009–10	Barako Bull / Barako Energy Coffee	12	**20.4**	.492	.319	.714	2.2	1.7	.5	.0	**10.5**
2010–11	Barako Bull	**34**	17.6	.347	**.355**	.773	**2.7**	1.9	**.7**	.1	6.2
2010–11	Meralco	**34**	17.6	.347	**.355**	.773	**2.7**	1.9	**.7**	.1	6.2
2010–11	Air21	**34**	17.6	.347	**.355**	.773	**2.7**	1.9	**.7**	.1	6.2
2012–13	GlobalPort	7	10.6	.238	.167	.750	.9	1.9	.4	.0	2.0
Career		70	17.3	.381	.325	.750	2.2	1.9	.5	.0	6.5
