= Marcy Arellano =

Filipino basketball player

Personal information
- Born: May 25, 1986 (age 40)
- Listed height: 5 ft 9 in (1.75 m)
- Listed weight: 175 lb (79 kg)

Career information
- High school: UE (Caloocan)
- College: UE
- PBA draft: 2009: 2nd round, 14th overall pick
- Drafted by: Rain or Shine Elasto Painters
- Playing career: 2009–2011; 2018–2023
- Position: Point guard

Career history
- 2009–2010: Rain or Shine Elasto Painters
- 2010–2011: Air21 Express
- 2018–2020: Manila Stars
- 2022: Quezon City MG
- 2022–2023: Manila CityStars / Stars

Career highlights
- UAAP Rookie of the Year (2004)

Marcelino "Marcy" Valdez Arellano II (born May 25, 1986) is a Filipino professional basketball player who last played for the Manila Stars of the Maharlika Pilipinas Basketball League (MPBL). From 2005 to 2009, he played in the amateur Philippine Basketball League (PBL). Earlier, he played college basketball for the University of the East of the University Athletic Association of the Philippines (UAAP), where he won the UAAP Rookie of the Year in UAAP Season 67.

In February 2024, Arellano is one of the 47 players banned by the MPBL for alleged involvement in game fixing.

== PBA career statistics ==
Legend
GP	Games played	MPG	Minutes per game
FG%	Field-goal percentage	3P%	3-point field-goal percentage	FT%	Free-throw percentage
RPG	Rebounds per game	APG	Assists per game	SPG	Steals per game
BPG	Blocks per game	PPG	Points per game	**Bold**	Career high

=== Season-by-season averages ===
Year	Team	GP	MPG	FG%	3P%	FT%	RPG	APG	SPG	BPG	PPG
2009–10	Rain or Shine	**29**	**9.7**	**.347**	**.143**	**.577**	1.2	1.1	.6	.0	**2.5**
2010–11	Air21	7	9.1	.333	.000	.375	**1.3**	**1.4**	**.7**	.0	1.3
Career		36	9.6	.345	.129	.529	1.2	1.2	.6	.0	2.2
