= Wesley Gonzales =

Filipino basketball player

Personal information
- Born: July 27, 1980 (age 46)
- Listed height: 6 ft 4 in (1.93 m)
- Listed weight: 180 lb (82 kg)

Career information
- High school: Ateneo (Quezon City)
- College: Ateneo
- PBA draft: 2004: 1st round, 9th overall pick
- Drafted by: FedEx Express
- Playing career: 2004–2013
- Position: Small forward / shooting guard
- Number: 2, 5, 15, 23, 34

Career history
- 2004–2006: FedEx Express
- 2006–2009: San Miguel Beermen/Magnolia Beverage Masters
- 2009–2010: Coca-Cola Tigers
- 2010–2011: Burger King Whoppers / Air21 Express
- 2011–2012: Alaska Aces
- 2012–2013: San Mig Coffee Mixers
- 2013: Barako Bull Energy Cola

Career highlights
- PBA champion (2009 Fiesta Conference); UAAP Champion (2002); UAAP Finals MVP (2002)

Wesley Olan Gonzales (born July 27, 1980, in Manila, Philippines) is a Filipino former professional basketball player. Gonzales last played for the Barako Bull Energy Cola before retiring after a stellar college career and a 10-year stint in the PBA.

== Player Profile ==
At 6-foot-5, Gonzales played for the 2002 UAAP championship squad of the Ateneo de Manila University Blue Eagles, and was named co-Finals MVP, along with teammate Larry Fonacier. He was drafted 9th overall in the 2004 PBA draft by the FedEx Express. In 2006, he was traded to the San Miguel Beermen and in late 2009 he became a player of the Coca-Cola Tigers before eventually going back to Air21. On May 16, 2011, the Alaska Aces moved to shore up a critical weakness and strengthened their guard corps by acquiring Wesley in exchange for their 2010 PBA draft 4th pick overall, Elmer Espiritu. After his stint with Barako Bull in 2014, he decided to call it quits and is now working at HSBC.

== PBA career statistics ==
Legend
GP	Games played	MPG	Minutes per game
FG%	Field-goal percentage	3P%	3-point field-goal percentage	FT%	Free-throw percentage
RPG	Rebounds per game	APG	Assists per game	SPG	Steals per game
BPG	Blocks per game	PPG	Points per game	**Bold**	Career high

=== Season-by-season averages ===
Year	Team	GP	MPG	FG%	3P%	FT%	RPG	APG	SPG	BPG	PPG
2004–05	FedEx	58	16.6	.384	.310	**.610**	2.4	**1.2**	.2	**.2**	6.6
2005–06	Air21	27	9.7	.264	.239	.500	1.2	.5	.2	.1	2.7
2005–06	San Miguel	15	10.1	.367	.344	.571	2.2	.7	.1	.1	3.7
2006–07	San Miguel	**60**	16.2	.356	.308	.598	2.3	1.0	.3	.1	5.4
2007–08	Magnolia	30	14.4	.427	**.419**	.433	**2.7**	.9	.3	**.2**	4.0
2008–09	San Miguel	48	14.3	**.443**	.340	.542	2.6	.9	.0	**.2**	4.9
2009–10	Coca-Cola	35	17.5	.353	.337	.448	2.6	.6	**.4**	.1	5.6
2009–10	Burger King / Air21	35	17.5	.353	.337	.448	2.6	.6	**.4**	.1	5.6
2010–11	Air21	32	**20.7**	.371	.373	.604	2.6	**1.2**	.3	.1	**6.8**
2011–12	Alaska	11	12.1	.243	.125	.500	1.2	.8	.1	.1	1.9
2012–13	San Mig Coffee	30	12.5	.313	.304	.444	1.5	.7	.1	.1	2.1
2012–13	Barako Bull	30	12.5	.313	.304	.444	1.5	.7	.1	.1	2.1
Career		346	15.2	.368	.321	.557	2.3	.9	.2	.1	4.9
