= 2010–11 PBA season =

36th PBA season

- Duration: October 3, 2010 – August 21, 2011
- Teams: 10
- TV partner(s): Solar Sports (Note: The 2010–11 Philippine Cup was aired on Solar TV while the last two conferences were aired on Studio 23.); Basketball TV; DZRJ 810 (Local); TFC (International)

2010 PBA Draft
- Top draft pick: Nonoy Baclao
- Picked by: Air21 Express
- Season MVP: Jimmy Alapag (Talk 'N Text Tropang Texters)
- Top scorer: Gary David (Powerade Tigers)
- Philippine Cup champions: Talk 'N Text Tropang Texters
- Philippine Cup runners-up: San Miguel Beermen
- Commissioner's Cup champions: Talk 'N Text Tropang Texters
- Commissioner's Cup runners-up: Barangay Ginebra Kings
- Governors' Cup champions: Petron Blaze Boosters
- Governors' Cup runners-up: Talk 'N Text Tropang Texters

Seasons
- ← 2009–10 2011–12 →

The 2010–11 PBA season was the 36th season of the Philippine Basketball Association. It started on October 3, 2010 and ended on August 21, 2011. The season marked the return of the original three-conference format, starting with the Philippine Cup, or the traditional All-Filipino Conference. The import-laden Commissioner's Cup returned as the second tournament, while the Governors' Cup also returned, serving as the third conference which also served as an import-laden tournament.

The first activity of the season is the 2010 PBA Draft held on August 29 at the Market! Market! in Taguig.

== Pre-season events ==
=== Player movement ===
Key transactions:
Trades:

- Air21 traded Doug Kramer to Rain or Shine for Marcy Arellano.
- Meralco dealt Ali Peek to Air21 for Beau Belga. Peek was then traded to Talk 'N Text for J.R. Quiñahan.
- Later on a separate transaction, Talk 'N Text traded Mark Cardona to Air21 in exchange of their 2010 first-round pick. Air21 later traded Cardona to Meralco in exchange of Joshua Urbiztondo and Meralco's 2010 1st-round pick.
- B-Meg Derby Ace traded Paul Artadi to San Miguel in exchange of Jonas Villanueva. Air21, acting as a conduit team, will get B-Meg Derby Ace's 2014 1st draft pick in exchange of their 2013 2nd-round pick.
- Powerade traded Larry Rodriguez to Rain or Shine in exchange for Eddie Laure and Rain or Shine's 2011 1st round draft pick.
- Meralco traded Jason Misolas and Khasim Mirza to Barako Bull for Rob Reyes. Reyes was then traded, along with Meralco's 2011 and 2012 2nd-round picks to Powerade in exchange for Asi Taulava. Powerade's Ken Bono was also traded to Barako Bull for the team's 2013 2nd round draft pick.

Signing:

- Rain or Shine signed John Ferriols and Paolo Bugia.
- Talk 'N Text signed Rich Alvarez.

=== Rule changes ===
The PBA board approved the rule changes for implementation starting this season:

Rule changes (effective for the 2010–11 PBA season)
1. 2-point or 3-point verification to be enforced for the entire game. During the last two minutes of the fourth quarter and overtime period(s), verification will be made during the next deadball situation.
2. During the last two minutes of the fourth quarter and overtime period(s), contested out of bounds calls will be subject to video review.
3. There will be no resetting of the shot clock after a jumpball if the tap goes to the offensive team.
4. A player who cannot shoot free throws awarded to him because of injury and is replaced can no longer return to the game. The substitute will shoot the free throws, regardless of the type of foul called (regular or flagrant). The same rule applies on jumper in jumpball situations.
5. No need to cross midcourt line for a player to call a 30-second timeout. During the last two minutes of the fourth quarter and overtime period(s), all timeouts will have the option to inbound from the free throw line extended.
6. In all overtime periods, a team enters penalty situation only after the second team foul. No more carryover of team fouls from the fourth quarter.
7. No more primary or secondary defender distinction. No more Lower Defensive Box (LDB).
8. No more flopping violation.
9. No more "leaving the playing court to gain advantage" violation.
10. A team shall be allowed to field in its 14-man line up during a game.

=== Notable occurrences ===
- Angelico "Chito" Salud became the eight commissioner of the league after the incumbent Sonny Barrios retired from his post.
- The PBA board approved the sale of the Sta. Lucia team franchise to Meralco. The team will now be known as the Meralco Bolts.
- The league will return to a three-conference format starting this season.
- Coca-Cola Philippines announced that they will rechristen the Coca-Cola Tigers as the Powerade Tigers.
- The Alaska Aces retired the jerseys of Johnny Abarrientos and Bong Hawkins in celebration of the 25th year of their franchise on September 28.

== Opening ceremonies ==
The season began on October 3 with the Meralco Bolts defeating the Barangay Ginebra Kings, 73–72.

The muses for the participating teams are as follows:

Team	Muse
Air21 Express	Daiana Menezes
Alaska Aces	Nancy Castiglione
B-Meg Llamados	Carla Abellana
Barako Bull Energy Boosters	Bianca Bauer
Barangay Ginebra Kings	Anne Curtis
Meralco Bolts	14 Meralco employees
Powerade Tigers	Vice Ganda
Rain or Shine Elasto Painters	Coleen Garcia
San Miguel Beermen	Georgina Wilson, Isabelle Daza and Sam Pinto
Talk 'N Text Tropang Texters	Jennylyn Mercado

== 2010–11 Philippine Cup ==
=== Player movement ===
Key transactions:
Trades:

- Barako Bull Energy Boosters trades Hans Thiele to the Meralco Bolts in exchange for Dennis Daa.
- San Miguel Beermen trades Lordy Tugade and Chris Canta to the Barako Bull Energy Boosters in exchange for Sunday Salvacion.
- Meralco Bolts trades Marlou Aquino, Khasim Mirza, Pong Escobal and a future draft pick to the Barako Bull Energy Boosters in exchange for Reed Juntilla and Mark Isip.

=== Notable events ===
- Asi Taulava of Meralco, Solomon Mercado of Rain or Shine and Kelly Williams of Talk 'N Text were loaned to Smart Gilas for the duration of the Asian Games in Guangzhou, China.
- PBA Commissioner Chito Salud proposed a "Developmental League" patterned after the NBA D-League after the merger of Liga Pilipinas and the Philippine Basketball League (PBL) fell out. The D-League proposal was eventually approved by the board of governors on January 25 and it is set to be launch on March.
- The board of governors approve the request of the Barako Bull Energy Boosters for a leave of absence for this season's Commissioner's Cup. The Smart Gilas Philippine basketball team will temporarily take over its place. All of the players of the Barako Bull will be put in a dispersal draft and will return to their mother team after the conference ends.

=== Elimination round ===
Pos	Team	W	L	PCT	GB	Qualification
1	Talk 'N Text Tropang Texters	11	3	.786 (Note: Head-to-head record: San Miguel 1–1 Talk 'N Text (San Miguel +9))	—	Twice-to-beat in the quarterfinals
2	San Miguel Beermen	11	3	.786	—	Twice-to-beat in the quarterfinals
3	Barangay Ginebra Kings	10	4	.714	1	Best-of-three quarterfinals
4	B-Meg Derby Ace Llamados	7	7	.500 (Note: Head-to-head differential: B-Meg +23, Meralco −11, Alaska −12)	4	Best-of-three quarterfinals
5	Meralco Bolts	7	7	.500	4	Best-of-three quarterfinals
6	Alaska Aces	7	7	.500	4	Best-of-three quarterfinals
7	Air21 Express	6	8	.429	5	Twice-to-win in the quarterfinals
8	Rain or Shine Elasto Painters	5	9	.357	6	Twice-to-win in the quarterfinals
9	Powerade Tigers	3	11	.214 (Note: Head-to-head record: Barako Bull 1–0 Powerade)	8	
10	Barako Bull Energy Boosters	3	11	.214	8	

Source: PBA.ph

=== Playoffs ===
Quarterfinals
(#1 twice-to-beat)
1	Talk 'N Text	107
8	Rain or Shine	92
(Best-of-3)
4	B-Meg Derby Ace	2
5	Meralco	0
(#2 twice-to-beat)
2	San Miguel	95
7	Air21	75
(Best-of-3)
3	Barangay Ginebra	2
6	Alaska	1

Semifinals (Best-of-7)
1	Talk 'N Text	4
4	B-Meg Derby Ace	2
2	San Miguel	4
3	Barangay Ginebra	2

Finals (Best-of-7)
1	Talk 'N Text	4
2	San Miguel	2

==== Quarterfinals ====
Team 1	Series	Team 2	Game 1	Game 2
(1) Talk 'N Text Tropang Texters*	1–0	(8) Rain or Shine Elasto Painters	107–92	—
(2) San Miguel Beermen*	1–0	(7) Air21 Express	95–75	—

Team 1	Series	Team 2	Game 1	Game 2	Game 3
(3) B-Meg Derby Ace Llamados	2–0	(6) Meralco Bolts	106–97 (2OT)	92–88	—
(4) Barangay Ginebra Kings	2–1	(5) Alaska Aces	101–104	92–76	79–70

*Team has twice-to-beat advantage. Team #1 only has to win once, while Team #2 has to win twice.

==== Semifinals ====
Team 1	Series	Team 2	Game 1	Game 2	Game 3	Game 4	Game 5	Game 6	Game 7
(1) Talk 'N Text Tropang Texters	4–2	(4) B-Meg Derby Ace Llamados	98–91	87–88	92–78	93–98	97–83	89–72	—
(2) San Miguel Beermen	4–2	(3) Barangay Ginebra Kings	86–84	108–102	78–95	108–104 (2OT)	76–102	89–86	—

==== Finals ====
Team 1	Series	Team 2	Game 1	Game 2	Game 3	Game 4	Game 5	Game 6	Game 7
(1) Talk 'N Text Tropang Texters	4–2	(2) San Miguel Beermen	91–82	110–102	82–103	87–91	99–77	95–82	—

- Finals MVP: Jimmy Alapag and Jayson Castro (Talk 'N Text)
- Best Player of the Conference: Jay Washington (San Miguel)

== 2011 Commissioner's Cup ==
=== Notable events ===
- The conditional dispersal draft of the Barako Bull players was held in the PBA office in Libis, Quezon City on February 7. Out of the 14 players, only Lordy Tugade and Escobal were drafted by San Miguel and B-Meg Derby Ace respectively.
- The Board of Governors approved Solar Entertainment's proposal to change its broadcast television partner from RPN to ABS-CBN's Studio 23 for the remainder of its contract with the league, beginning with the 2011 Commissioner's Cup.
- The PBA D-League will start on March 12 at the Filoil Flying V Arena in San Juan. The league will be composed of 14 teams, with three teams (Powerade-UP, Metro Pacific, Maynilad) having affiliation with existing PBA teams. Four teams (Cobra Energy Drink, Agri-Nature Inc./FCA, Pharex, and Cafe France) that supposed to be part of the revival of the dormant Philippine Basketball League filed for application in the PBA D-League, hours after the PBL held its press conference regarding its revival.
- The sale of the Barako Bull Energy Boosters' franchise to Phoenix Petroleum did not push through after they failed to get the required number of votes (seven out of ten) from the PBA Board of Governors. Due to this development, Barako Bull's leave of absence was extended up to the end of the Governors' Cup.

=== Player movement ===
Key transactions:
Trades:

- On January 20, Rain or Shine, Meralco and Air21 were involved in a three-way trade. Rain or Shine was able to get Ronjay Buenafe, Ronnie Matias, the 2011 and 2013 1st-round picks from Air21 and Beau Belga from Meralco. Meralco will now have Solomon Mercado and Paolo Bugia from Rain or Shine and Erick Rodriguez of Air21. Air21 will now have Jay-R Reyes from Rain or Shine, Reed Juntilla from Meralco and the 2011 and 2013 second-round picks from Meralco.
- On January 28, Air21 traded J.R. Quiñahan to Powerade in exchange for the team's 2014 1st-round pick. The said trade was revised by Commissioner Chito Salud on January 31 and Air21 will instead get Powerade's 2012 second round and 2013 first round picks.
- Alaska traded Reynel Hugnatan to Meralco in exchange for Hans Thiele and Paolo Bugia.
- On March 2, Commissioner Chito Salud approves the trade between Air21 and San Miguel. Air21 traded top rookie picks Nonoy Baclao, Rabeh Al-Hussaini, and Rey Guevarra in exchange for Danny Seigle, Dondon Hontiveros, Dorian Peña and Paul Artadi. The proposed trade was disapproved by Commissioner Salud when San Miguel initially offered Danny Seigle, Mick Pennisi, Joseph Yeo and a 2011 first-round pick in exchange for the three Air21 rookies.

Signing:

- Meralco signs Marlou Aquino and will assume his Barako Bull contract until the end of the Commissioner's Cup.
- Smart Gilas has listed Borgie Hermida in their line-up for the Commissioner's Cup and will return to Barako Bull after the tournament. However, Barako Bull announced that they will not play for the remainder of the season. Eventually, Hermida was released from Gilas.
- San Miguel Beermen has added Paolo Hubalde to their roster for the Commissioner's Cup and will return to Barako Bull after the tournament. However, Barako Bull announced that they will not play for the remainder of the season.

=== Coaching changes ===
- On January 10, the Rain or Shine Elasto Painters hired Air21 Express coach Yeng Guiao as head coach, after Guiao's contract with Air21 expired on December 31, 2010. Guiao will be replacing Caloy Garcia, who will slide down as assistant coach.
- On January 19, the Air21 Express hired Bong Ramos as head coach, replacing head Yeng Guiao whose contract expired on December 31, 2010.

=== Elimination round ===
Pos	Team	W	L	PCT	GB	Qualification
1	Talk 'N Text Tropang Texters	8	1	.889	—	Advance to semifinals
2	Smart Gilas (G)	7	2	.778	1	Advance to semifinals
3	Barangay Ginebra Kings	5	4	.556 (Note: Head-to-head differential: Barangay Ginebra +12, Air21 −4, Alaska −8)	3	Advance to quarterfinals
4	Air21 Express	5	4	.556	3	Advance to quarterfinals
5	Alaska Aces	5	4	.556	3	Advance to quarterfinals
6	Rain or Shine Elasto Painters	4	5	.444 (Note: Head-to-head record: Rain or Shine 1–0 B-Meg)	4	Advance to quarterfinals
7	B-Meg Derby Ace Llamados	4	5	.444	4	
8	Meralco Bolts	3	6	.333	5	
9	Powerade Tigers	2	7	.222 (Note: Head-to-head record: Powerade 1–0 San Miguel)	6	
10	San Miguel Beermen	2	7	.222	6	

Source: PBA.ph
(G) Guests

=== Playoffs ===
Quarterfinals (Best-of-3)
4	Air21	2
5	Alaska	1
3	Barangay Ginebra	2
6	Rain or Shine	1

Semifinals (Best-of-5)
1	Talk 'N Text	3
4	Air21	0
2	Smart Gilas	1
3	Barangay Ginebra	3

Finals (Best-of-7)
1	Talk 'N Text	4
3	Barangay Ginebra	2

==== Quarterfinals ====
Team 1	Series	Team 2	Game 1	Game 2	Game 3
(3) Barangay Ginebra Kings	2–1	(6) Rain or Shine Elasto Painters	100–91	97–113	92–82
(4) Air21 Express	2–1	(5) Alaska Aces	89–91	94–84	97–94

==== Semifinals ====
Team 1	Series	Team 2	Game 1	Game 2	Game 3	Game 4	Game 5
(1) Talk 'N Text Tropang Texters	3–1	(4) Air21 Express	97–90	114–96	118–104	—	—
(2) Smart Gilas	1–3	(3) Barangay Ginebra Kings	96–97	103–110	100–88	85–92	—

==== Finals ====
Team 1	Series	Team 2	Game 1	Game 2	Game 3	Game 4	Game 5	Game 6	Game 7
(1) Talk 'N Text Tropang Texters	4–2	(3) Barangay Ginebra Kings	102–83	106–108	104–88	91–84	93–100	99–96 (OT)	—

- Finals MVP: Jimmy Alapag and Jayson Castro (Talk 'N Text)
- Best Player of the Conference: Jimmy Alapag (Talk 'N Text)
- Best Import of the Conference: Nate Brumfield (Barangay Ginebra)

== 2011 PBA All-Star Weekend ==
The 2011 PBA All-Star Weekend were held from May 20 to 22 at the Boracay Convention Center, Malay, Aklan. The winners were:

- Obstacle Challenge: Jonas Villanueva (B-Meg Derby Ace Llamados)
- Three-point Shootout: Mark Macapagal (Powerade Tigers)
- Slam Dunk Competition: Kelly Williams (Talk 'N Text Tropang Texters)
- Legends Shootout: Active players - Mark Macapagal (Powerade), Ronald Tubid (Barangay Ginebra) and Jimmy Alapag (Talk 'N Text)

=== Rookie-Sophomore Blitz Game ===
Solar

May 20

Report

Rookies 114, Sophomores 106
Scoring by quarter: 27-23, 57-50, 82-84, 114-109
Pts: Labagala 25, Vanlandingham 17, Espiritu 16, Thiele 15, Wilson 14, Anthony 12, Guevarra 9, Weinstein 6	Pts: Rodriguez 27, Cruz 21, Gaco 19, Urbiztondo 15, Ross 14, Oreta 13

Boracay Convention Center, Boracay, Aklan

- Blitz Game MVP: Robert Labagala and Sean Anthony (Rookies)

=== All-Star Game ===
Solar

May 22
6:30 p.m.

North All-Stars 133, South All-Stars 129

Boracay Convention Center, Boracay, Aklan

- All-Star Game MVP: Marc Pingris (North All-Stars)

== 2011 Governors' Cup ==
=== Player movement ===
Key transactions:
Trades:

- On May 18, Air21 traded Wesley Gonzales to Alaska for Elmer Espiritu.
- Alaska traded Joe Devance to Air21 for Jay-R Reyes. On May 30, Commissioner Chito Salud revised the trade and added Air21's 2011 and 2012 2nd-round picks. On June 3, Devance then traded to B-Meg Derby Ace Llamados for KG Canaleta and Jondan Salvador.
- On July 18, Barangay Ginebra traded Willie Miller to Air21 Express for KG Canaleta and a 2012 first round draft pick (acquired from the Powerade Tigers in a trade involving Sean Anthony and Renren Ritualo on September 13, 2010)

=== Notable occurrences ===
- San Miguel Corporation announced that they will rename the San Miguel Beermen as the Petron Blaze Boosters.
- B-Meg Derby Ace Llamados shorten their name into B-Meg Llamados.
- Two elimination round games were held at the Al Shabab Al Arabi Sports Club in Dubai, United Arab Emirates from June 30 to July 1 featuring B-Meg, Talk 'N Text and Barangay Ginebra. B-Meg won against Talk 'N Text, 111–105, then Talk 'N Text beat Barangay Ginebra the next day, 123–113.
- Players of the Talk 'N Text Tropang Texters got stranded in Dubai after their two-game stint. The travel agency in charge reportedly cancelled their plane tickets to Manila after the non-payment of the organizers.
- PBA announced that TV5 will become the provide their TV coverage for the next five years. This was made by Commissioner Chito Salud on July 8, 2011, during the PBA Board of Governors meeting. TV5 guaranteed the league P700 million in cash, P150 million for marketing and promotions, and P115 million worth of ad spots up to 2016. TV5 will also be handling the radio coverage of the PBA as well.
- Barako Bull has sold their franchise to Linaheim Corp. following approval of the sale by the PBA Board of Governors on July 8, 2011, thus making the PBA to have 10 teams next season.

=== Elimination round ===
Pos	Team	W	L	PCT	GB	Qualification
1	Talk 'N Text Tropang Texters	6	2	.750	—	Semifinal round
2	Petron Blaze Boosters	5	3	.625 (Note: Head-to-head differential: Petron +10, Alaska +5, Barangay Ginebra −15)	1	Semifinal round
3	Alaska Aces	5	3	.625	1	Semifinal round
4	Barangay Ginebra Kings	5	3	.625	1	Semifinal round
5	Rain or Shine Elasto Painters	4	4	.500 (Note: Head-to-head differential: Rain or Shine +11, B-Meg 0, Powerade −11)	2	Semifinal round
6	B-Meg Derby Ace Llamados	4	4	.500	2	Semifinal round
7	Powerade Tigers	4	4	.500	2	
8	Meralco Bolts	3	5	.375	3	
9	Air21 Express	0	8	.000	6	

Source: PBA.ph

=== Semifinal round ===
Overall standings
Pos	Team	W	L	PCT	GB	Qualification
1	Talk 'N Text Tropang Texters	9	4	.692	—	Finals
2	Petron Blaze Boosters	8	5	.615 (Note: Head-to-head differential: Petron +13, Alaska +6, Barangay Ginebra −19)	1	Finals
3	Alaska Aces	8	5	.615	1	
4	Barangay Ginebra Kings	8	5	.615	1	
5	Rain or Shine Elasto Painters	6	7	.462	3	
6	B-Meg Derby Ace Llamados	5	8	.385	4	

Source: PBA.ph
Notes:

Semifinal round standings
Pos	Team	W	L
1	Petron Blaze Boosters	3 (Note: Head-to-head differential: Petron +30, Talk 'N Text +15, Barangay Ginebra −16, Alaska −29)	2
2	Talk 'N Text Tropang Texters	3	2
3	Barangay Ginebra Kings	3	2
4	Alaska Aces	3	2
5	Rain or Shine Elasto Painters	2	3
6	B-Meg Derby Ace Llamados	1	4

Source: PBA.ph

=== Finals ===
Team 1	Series	Team 2	Game 1	Game 2	Game 3	Game 4	Game 5	Game 6	Game 7
(1) Talk 'N Text Tropang Texters	3–4	(2) Petron Blaze Boosters	88–89	103–85	132–105	83–105	80–93	104–78	73–85

- Finals MVP: Arwind Santos (Petron Blaze)
- Best Player of the Conference: Arwind Santos (Petron Blaze)
- Best Import of the Conference: Arizona Reid (Rain or Shine)

== Smart Ultimate All-Star Weekend ==
Marcio Lassiter guarding Kobe Bryant during the Smart Ultimate All-Star Weekend

The Smart Ultimate All-Star Weekend was held from July 23–24 at the newly renamed Smart Araneta Coliseum in Quezon City. The all star weekend featured the Smart All-Stars, with Kobe Bryant as its playing coach challenging the PBA All-Stars, with Chot Reyes as the head coach and the Smart Gilas Philippine national basketball team. The event was organized by Smart Communications and the MVP Sports Foundation, headed by Manuel V. Pangilinan, team owner of the Talk 'N Text Tropang Texters and the Meralco Bolts in the PBA.

=== Rosters ===
Note: Due to the then ongoing NBA lockout, the Smart All-Stars cannot affiliate themselves with the NBA or their teams. The list below indicates the NBA teams where the player is associated before the lockout began.

Smart All-Stars:

- Kevin Durant (Oklahoma City Thunder)
- Tyreke Evans (Sacramento Kings)
- Derek Fisher (Los Angeles Lakers)
- James Harden (Oklahoma City Thunder)
- JaVale McGee (Washington Wizards)
- Chris Paul (New Orleans Hornets)
- Derrick Rose (Chicago Bulls)
- Derrick Williams (Minnesota Timberwolves)
- Playing Coach: Kobe Bryant (Los Angeles Lakers)

PBA All-Stars:

- Rabeh Al-Hussaini (Petron Blaze Boosters)
- Alex Cabagnot (Petron Blaze Boosters)
- Mark Caguioa (Barangay Ginebra Kings)
- Jayson Castro (Talk 'N Text Tropang Texters)
- Gary David (Powerade Tigers)
- Larry Fonacier (Talk 'N Text Tropang Texters)
- JC Intal (Barangay Ginebra Kings)
- Sol Mercado (Meralco Bolts)
- Gabe Norwood (Rain or Shine Elasto Painters)
- Marc Pingris (B-Meg Llamados)
- Ryan Reyes (Talk 'N Text Tropang Texters)
- Arwind Santos (Petron Blaze Boosters)
- Danny Seigle (Air21 Express)
- LA Tenorio (Alaska Aces)
- Sonny Thoss (Alaska Aces)
- James Yap (B-Meg Llamados)
- Coach: Chot Reyes (Talk 'N Text Tropang Texters)

=== Results ===
Sports5

July 23

Report

Smart All-Stars 131, PBA All-Stars 105
Scoring by quarter: 30-26, 36-24, 41-28, 24-27
Pts: McGee 25, Durant 22, Williams 19	Pts: Santos 25, Cabagnot 9, Pingris 9

Smart Araneta Coliseum, Quezon City

Sports5

July 24

Report

Smart All-Stars 98, Smart Gilas 89
Scoring by quarter: 28-16, 27-21, 24-23, 19-29
Pts: Bryant 17, McGee 16, Durant 16	Pts: Casio 16, Douthit 14, Lutz 12

Smart Araneta Coliseum, Quezon City

== Individual awards ==
=== Most Valuable Player race ===
This how the MVP award was determined:

Player	Statistics	Media	Players	TV coveror	Commissioner's Office	Total
Jimmy Alapag	335	1,030	173	300	50	1,888
Arwind Santos	408	646	233	100	300	1,687
Mark Caguioa	364	162	41	600	150	1,317

=== List ===
- Most Valuable Player: Jimmy Alapag (Talk 'N Text)
- Rookie of the Year: Rabeh Al-Hussaini (Petron Blaze)
- First Mythical Team:
  - Jimmy Alapag (Talk 'N Text)
  - Mark Caguioa (Barangay Ginebra)
  - Arwind Santos (Petron Blaze)
  - Sonny Thoss (Alaska)
  - Kelly Williams (Talk 'N Text)
- Second Mythical Team:
  - Jayson Castro (Talk 'N Text)
  - Joe Devance (B-Meg)
  - Ali Peek (Talk 'N Text)
  - Jay Washington (Petron Blaze)
  - James Yap (B-Meg)
- All-Defensive Team:
  - John Wilson (Barangay Ginebra)
  - Willy Wilson (Barangay Ginebra)
  - Arwind Santos (Petron Blaze)
  - Marc Pingris (B-Meg)
  - Ryan Reyes (Talk 'N Text)
- Most Improved Player: Jayson Castro (Talk 'N Text)
- Sportsmanship Award: Sonny Thoss (Alaska)

=== Awards given by the PBA Press Corps ===
- Defensive Player of the Year: Arwind Santos (Petron Blaze)
- Coach of the Year: Chot Reyes (Talk 'N Text)
- Mr. Quality Minutes: Jayson Castro (Talk 'N Text)
- Comeback Player of the Year: Danny Ildefonso (Petron Blaze)
- Executive of the Year: Manny Pangilinan (Talk 'N Text)
- Referee of the Year: Jimmy Mariano
- Order of Merit: Mark Caguioa (Barangay Ginebra)
- All-Rookie Team
  - Rabeh Al-Hussaini (Petron Blaze)
  - Nonoy Baclao (Petron Blaze)
  - John Wilson (Barangay Ginebra)
  - Robert Labagala (Barangay Ginebra)
  - Sean Anthony (Powerade)

== Cumulative standings ==
Pos	Team	Pld	W	L	PCT	Best finish
1	Talk 'N Text Tropang Texters	65	47	18	.723	Champions
2	Smart Gilas (G)	13	8	5	.615	Semifinalist
3	Barangay Ginebra Kings	58	34	24	.586	Finalist
4	San Miguel Beermen/Petron Blaze Boosters	56	32	24	.571	Champions
5	Alaska Aces	42	22	20	.524	Semifinalist
6	B-Meg Derby Ace/B-Meg Llamados	44	20	24	.455	Semifinalist
7	Rain or Shine Elasto Painters	40	16	24	.400	Semifinalist
8	Meralco Bolts	33	13	20	.394	Quarterfinalist
9	Air21 Express	38	13	25	.342	Semifinalist
10	Powerade Tigers	31	9	22	.290	Elimination round
11	Barako Bull Energy Boosters	14	3	11	.214	Elimination round

(G) Guests

=== Elimination rounds ===
Pos	Team	Pld	W	L	PCT
1	Talk 'N Text Tropang Texters	31	25	6	.806
2	Smart Gilas (G)	9	7	2	.778
3	Barangay Ginebra Kings	31	20	11	.645
4	San Miguel Beermen/Petron Blaze Boosters	31	18	13	.581
5	Alaska Aces	31	17	14	.548
6	B-Meg Derby Ace/B-Meg Llamados	31	15	16	.484
7	Meralco Bolts	31	13	18	.419
8	Rain or Shine Elasto Painters	31	13	18	.419
9	Air21 Express	31	11	20	.355
10	Powerade Tigers	31	9	22	.290
11	Barako Bull Energy Boosters	14	3	11	.214

(G) Guests

=== Playoffs ===
Pos	Team	Pld	W	L
1	Talk 'N Text Tropang Texters	34	22	12
2	San Miguel Beermen/Petron Blaze Boosters	25	14	11
3	Barangay Ginebra Kings	27	14	13
4	Alaska Aces	11	5	6
5	B-Meg Derby Ace/B-Meg Llamados	13	5	8
6	Rain or Shine Elasto Painters	9	3	6
7	Air21 Express	7	2	5
8	Smart Gilas (G)	4	1	3
9	Meralco Bolts	2	0	2
10	Barako Bull Energy Boosters	0	0	0
11	Powerade Tigers	0	0	0

(G) Guests
