= Borgie Hermida =

Filipino basketball player

NLEX Road Warriors
- Title: Assistant coach
- League: PBA

Personal information
- Born: October 27, 1988 (age 38)
- Listed height: 5 ft 8 in (1.73 m)
- Listed weight: 160 lb (73 kg)

Career information
- High school: San Beda (Manila)
- College: San Beda
- PBA draft: 2010: 2nd round, 17th overall pick
- Drafted by: Barako Bull Energy Boosters
- Playing career: 2010–2016
- Position: Point guard
- Coaching career: 2019–present

Career history

Playing
- 2010–2011: Barako Bull Energy Boosters
- 2011–2012: Shopinas.com Clickers
- 2014–2015: NLEX Road Warriors
- 2016: Byaheng SCTEX

Coaching
- 2019–present: NLEX Road Warriors (assistant)

Career highlights
- 4× NCAA Philippines champion (2006–2008, 2010)

John Carlos Matanguihan Hermida Jr., better known as Borgie Hermida, is a Filipino professional basketball coach and former player. He is the senior team manager for the Bataan Risers of the Maharlika Pilipinas Basketball League (MPBL) and assistant coach of NLEX Road Warriors of the Philippine Basketball Association (PBA).

He was drafted 17th overall in the 2010 PBA draft by the Barako Bull Energy Boosters. During his five seasons in college with the San Beda Red Lions, he won 4 titles from 2006 to 2008 and 2010. He has won 4 titles with the San Beda Red Lions 2006-2008 and 2010, and as a Mythical Five Member of NCAA Season 86 Before graduating from San Beda after 16 years of service to the school.

== Professional career ==
Hermida was drafted seventeenth overall by Barako Bull Energy Boosters in the 2010 PBA draft. However, Hermida was released by the team, now known as Shopinas.com Clickers at the end of the 2011–12 PBA Philippine Cup.

In 2012, after being released by Shopinas.com, the NLEX Road Warriors of the PBA Developmental League signed him. After NLEX's application to go to the PBA was approved, he was one of the players of the original NLEX team who went to play in the PBA.

In 2016, Hermida was signed by SCTEX Road Warriors as one its players for the Pilipinas Commercial Basketball League.

== PBA career statistics ==
Legend
GP	Games played	MPG	Minutes per game
FG%	Field-goal percentage	3P%	3-point field-goal percentage	FT%	Free-throw percentage
RPG	Rebounds per game	APG	Assists per game	SPG	Steals per game
BPG	Blocks per game	PPG	Points per game	**Bold**	Career high

=== Season-by-season averages ===
Year	Team	GP	MPG	FG%	3P%	FT%	RPG	APG	SPG	BPG	PPG
2010–11	Barako Bull	6	**11.5**	.238	.125	**1.000**	**1.5**	.7	.3	.0	**2.2**
2011–12	Shopinas.com	**9**	9.9	.259	.000	.500	1.1	**1.7**	**.8**	**.1**	1.7
2014–15	NLEX	7	7.1	**.308**	**.250**	**1.000**	1.0	.4	.1	.0	1.7
Career		22	9.5	.262	.118	.857	1.2	1.0	.5	.1	1.8

== Personal life ==
He is the youngest of 5 siblings by his parents Carlos L. Hermida and Gliselda M. Hermida.
