= Rob Labagala =

Filipino basketball player (born 1984)

Personal information
- Born: July 5, 1984 (age 42) Talisay, Cebu, Philippines
- Listed height: 5 ft 7 in (1.70 m)
- Listed weight: 170 lb (77 kg)

Career information
- High school: CIT (Cebu City)
- College: UE
- PBA draft: 2010: 2nd round, 12th overall pick
- Drafted by: Barangay Ginebra Kings
- Playing career: 2010–2015
- Position: Point guard
- Coaching career: 2019–present

Career history

Playing
- 2010–2013: Barangay Ginebra Kings / Barangay Ginebra San Miguel
- 2014: Barako Bull Energy
- 2014–2015: Talk 'N Text Tropang Texters

Coaching
- 2019: UE (assistant)
- 2025: Basilan Viva Portmasters (assistant)
- 2025: San Sebastian

Career highlights
- PBA champion (2015 Commissioner's); PBA All-Rookie Team (2010–11); PBA Blitz Game Co-MVP (2011)

Roberts Raymond T. Labagala (born July 5, 1984) is a Filipino basketball coach and former professional player who served as the head coach for the San Sebastian Stags of the National Collegiate Athletic Association (NCAA).. He last played for the Talk 'N Text Tropang Texters of the Philippine Basketball Association (PBA). Standing at 5 feet 7 inches, Labagala plays at the point guard position.

He played collegiate basketball at the University of the East where he was a benchwarmer who played the fewest minutes on the court. Shortly after graduating, he was picked with the 12th overall pick on the second round of the 2010 PBA draft by the Barangay Ginebra Kings. He played short minutes on his rookie season due to the Kings' tight guard rotation. After his rookie season, he end up included in the All-Rookie team and being the Rookie Blitz Game Most Valuable Player.

After three seasons with the Kings that was renamed to San Miguel on the last season of his tenure with the team, he was traded to the Barako Bull Energy for very similar Emman Monfort. As usual on his career, Labagala sat out mostly and played just 3 minutes per game in one season with the Energy. When Labagala's contract expired, he was left unsigned by his team and months later was signed by Talk 'N Text Tropang Texters where he won his first PBA championship.

== Early life and career ==
Labagala was born on 5 July 1984 on Talisay, Cebu where he was also raised. He studied and played high school basketball at the Cebu Institute of Technology – University

Labagala played collegiate basketball for the University of the East's Red Warriors. Because Labagala spent little time on the court, his chances of being scouted by PBA teams that could bring him to the country's premier league was much smaller. Labagala played the fewest minutes among the Red Warriors but was able to help the team's offensive capabilities through his passing ability and speed.

== Professional career ==
=== Barangay Ginebra Kings/San Miguel (2010-2014) ===
Nobody thought that Labagala would set foot on a PBA court. His low playing time during his college years meant he was underrated. Labagala was among the oldest rookies in his class and the least-popular. Fortunately, he was picked with the twelfth overall pick of the 2010 PBA draft by the country's most popular team which is the Barangay Ginebra Kings. Labagala poured in 8 points and 3 assists in his PBA debut in a loss against Alaska. He only played 19 games on his rookie season and poured almost 5 points and one assist per game. On his sophomore year, he played more games and more minutes and his statistics slightly went down to 3.87 in 14 minutes action per game. He helped the team in their playoff run on the 2013 PBA Commissioner's Cup. The Kings went on the finals one-time on his third season where they got swept in a best-of-five series.

== Coaching career ==
In 2025, Labagala is in the coaching staff of the Basilan Starhorse. The Basilan team is managed by Bernard Yang. Later that year, Yang became the general of the San Sebastian Stags college team, and Labagala was named their head coach. Arvin Bonleon, the coach he is replacing, will become one of his assistants.

== Personal life ==
Labagala currently resides at Navotas, his wife's hometown where he currently owns a pastry bakeshop named after him, Little Rob's Cake Haus. Labagala is involved in training the youth of Navotas for improvement, he launched his own basketball camp on 2013. Labagala is a Christian.

== PBA career statistics ==
Legend
GP	Games played	MPG	Minutes per game
FG%	Field-goal percentage	3P%	3-point field-goal percentage	FT%	Free-throw percentage
RPG	Rebounds per game	APG	Assists per game	SPG	Steals per game
BPG	Blocks per game	PPG	Points per game	**Bold**	Career high

=== Season-by-season averages ===
Year	Team	GP	MPG	FG%	3P%	FT%	RPG	APG	SPG	BPG	PPG
2010–11	Barangay Ginebra	19	14.1	**.493**	**.481**	.533	.8	1.0	**.6**	**.1**	**4.7**
2011–12	Barangay Ginebra	**30**	**14.2**	.429	.281	**.850**	**1.2**	**1.5**	.2	.0	3.9
2012–13	Barangay Ginebra	29	8.5	.384	.188	.500	.3	.6	.2	.0	2.6
2013–14	Barako Bull	9	11.3	.419	.000	.250	1.1	1.1	**.6**	.0	3.0
2014–15	Talk 'N Text	8	3.6	.250	.000	.500	.1	.3	.0	.0	.9
Career		95	11.3	.422	.305	.627	.8	1.0	.3	.0	3.3

== Coaching record ==
Season	Team	Elimination round					Playoffs				
Season	Team	Finish	GP	W	L	PCT	GP	W	L	PCT	Results
2025	SSC-R	5th/5	13	3	10	.231	Did not qualify				
Totals			13	3	10	.231	0	0	0	—	0 championships
