= Jason Misolas =

Filipino basketball player

Personal information
- Born: September 28, 1978 (age 48) Daraga, Albay, Philippines
- Listed height: 6 ft 3 in (1.91 m)
- Listed weight: 195 lb (88 kg)

Career information
- College: Letran
- PBA draft: 2002: 3rd round, 25th overall pick
- Drafted by: Coca-Cola Tigers
- Playing career: 2002, 2006–2011
- Position: Power forward
- Coaching career: 2018–2022

Career history

Playing
- 2002, 2006–2009: Coca-Cola Tigers
- 2009–2010: Sta. Lucia Realtors
- 2010–2011: Barako Bull Energy Boosters

Coaching
- 2018–2022: UST Growling Tigers (assistant)

Career highlights
- PBA champion (2002 All-Filipino); 2x PBL champion (2004 Unity, 2005-06 Heroes); 2× NCAA Champion (1998, 1999)

Jason G. Misolas is a Filipino former professional basketball player in the Philippine Basketball Association (PBA). He was also an assistant coach for the UST Growling Tigers.

== College career ==
Misolas played for the Letran Knights in college, winning two back-to-back NCAA championships from 1998 to 1999 alongside Kerby Raymundo, Chris Calaguio, and Aldin Ayo. When Raymundo left in 2000, he became the leader of the team. He graduated from the team in 2001.

== Professional career ==
=== Coca-Cola Tigers ===
==== 2002: Rookie Season ====
Misolas was drafted in the third round by the Coca-Cola Tigers. Although he was rarely used, he became a PBA champion when on Christmas Day, Coca-Cola won Game 4 and clinched the All-Filipino Cup.

==== 2006–2009 ====
When his contract expired, Misolas left Coca-Cola to play in the Philippine Basketball League (PBL). He won two PBL championships from 2004 to 2006.

Misolas returned to Coca-Cola in 2006 for the 2006–07 Philippine Cup. In a win against the Purefoods Chunkee Giants, Misolas had career-highs of 14 points and 10 rebounds. Against the San Miguel Beermen, he scored 10 points. In a win over Alaska, he scored a new career-high 15 points, all in the first half.

=== Sta. Lucia Realtors ===
In 2009, Misolas and two second round draft picks were traded for Dennis Espino. In the 2009–10 Philippine Cup, they were eliminated by the Rain or Shine Elasto Painters in the wildcard round.

=== Barako Bull Energy Boosters ===
On September 22, 2010, Misolas was traded for Asi Taulava to the Barako Bull Energy Boosters in a three-team trade.

On January 20, 2011, the management of the Energy Boosters announced that they would take a leave of absence for the 2011 Commissioner's Cup to make way for the Smart Gilas Philippine national team. Misolas and the other players were put into a dispersal draft. He and Mark Andaya were not picked, making them free agents. After that, Misolas closed out his career playing in various commercial leagues and regional tournaments.

== Coaching career ==
In 2018, Misolas joined the coaching staff of the UST Growling Tigers. In UAAP Season 84, UST went 3–11, and finished the season with a six-game losing streak. After their season ended, he and all of the assistant coaches resigned.

== National team career ==
In 2005, Misolas was selected to be part of the Philippine men's national basketball team pool for the 2005 SEABA Championship. However, the Philippine team was suspended by FIBA for two years.

== PBA career statistics ==
Legend
GP	Games played	MPG	Minutes per game
FG%	Field-goal percentage	3P%	3-point field-goal percentage	FT%	Free-throw percentage
RPG	Rebounds per game	APG	Assists per game	SPG	Steals per game
BPG	Blocks per game	PPG	Points per game	**Bold**	Career high

=== Season-by-season averages ===
Year	Team	GP	MPG	FG%	3P%	FT%	RPG	APG	SPG	BPG	PPG
2002	Coca-Cola	5	3.2	.000	.000	—	1.6	.0	.0	.0	.0
2006–07	Coca-Cola	31	**25.7**	**.414**	—	.739	**5.5**	**.7**	.5	**.2**	**5.6**
2007–08	Coca-Cola	15	12.5	.391	**1.000**	**1.000**	2.5	.2	.1	.0	1.5
2008–09	Coca-Cola	21	9.3	.310	.333	.500	2.3	.3	.2	.1	1.1
2009–10	Sta. Lucia	**34**	11.9	.365	.000	.733	1.9	.4	.3	.1	2.7
2010–11	Barako Bull	4	13.5	.273	—	**1.000**	3.0	.5	**.8**	.0	2.0
Career		110	15.1	.380	.333	.736	3.1	.4	.3	.1	2.9
