= List of Barako Bull Energy seasons =

Legend
Champion

Runner-up

Semifinalist

This is a list of seasons by the Barako Bull Energy of the Philippine Basketball Association.

== Three-conference era ==
Season	Conference	Team name	Elimination/classification round						Playoffs	
Season	Conference	Team name	Finish	GP	W	L	PCT	GB	Stage	Results
2002	Governors Cup	FedEx Express	5th/12	11	6	5	.545	3	Semifinals	6th overall (6-10), 0-5 in Semifinals
2002	Commissioner's Cup	FedEx Express	6th/10	10	6	4	.600	1	Quarterfinals	Alaska** def FedEx in 2 games
2002	All-Filipino Cup	FedEx Express	10th/10	9	1	8	.125	7	Did not qualify	
2003	All-Filipino Cup	FedEx Express	2nd/5	18	10	8	.556	2	Quarterfinals	4th in Group A (1–2)
2003	Invitational Cup	FedEx Express	1st/5	4	3	1	.750	--	Semifinals; 3rd-place playoff	Coca-Cola 91, FedEx 83*; FedEx 99, Red Bull 84*
2003	Reinforced Conference	FedEx Express	2nd/5	13	5	8	.385	3	Quarterfinals	San Miguel 2, FedEx 0
Elimination round				65	31	34	.477	—	2 semifinal appearance	
Playoffs				10	3	7	.300	—	0 Finals appearances	
Cumulative totals				75	34	41	.453	—	0 championships	

*One-game playoff
**Team had twice-to-beat advantage

== Two-conference era ==
Season	Conference	Team name	Elimination/classification round						Playoffs	
Season	Conference	Team name	Finish	GP	W	L	PCT	GB	Stage	Results
(2004)	Fiesta Conference	FedEx Express	9th/10	18	5	13	.278	11	Wildcard phase	Talk 'N Text 105, FedEx 103*
2004-05	Philippine Cup	FedEx Express	9th/10	18	6	12	.333	6	Did not qualify	
2004-05	Fiesta Conference	FedEx Express	5th/10	18	9	9	.500	3	Wildcard phase	Purefoods 2, FedEx 1
2005-06	Fiesta Conference	Air21 Express	5th/9	16	9	7	.563	1	2nd-seed playoff Wildcard phase Quarterfinals; Semifinals; 3rd-place playoff	Talk 'N Text 101, Air21 91*; Air21 2, San Miguel 1 Air21 3, Talk 'N Text 2 Purefoods 4, Air21 2 Air21 108, Barangay Ginebra 98*
2005-06	Philippine Cup	Air21 Express	6th/9	16	7	9	.438	5	Wildcard phase	2nd overall (9–10), 2nd in wildcards (2–1)
2006-07	Philippine Cup	Air21 Express	8th/10	18	7	11	.389	6	Wildcard phase Wildcard final	2nd overall (10–11), 1st in wildcards (3–0); Sta. Lucia 121, Air21 118 (OT)*
2006-07	Fiesta Conference	Air21 Express	5th/10	18	10	8	.556	3	5th-seed playoff Quarterfinals	Air21 103, San Miguel 99*; Talk 'N Text 2, Air21 1
2007-08	Philippine Cup	Air21 Express	8th/10	18	7	11	.389	5	1st wildcard round 2nd wildcard round	Air21 119, Barangay Ginebra 110*; Coca-Cola 109, Air21 102*
2007-08	Fiesta Conference	Air21 Express	1st/10	18	12	6	.667	--	Semifinals; Finals	Air21 4, Magnolia 2 Barangay Ginebra 4, Air21 3
2008-09	Philippine Cup	Air21 Express	8th/10	18	8	10	.444	4	1st wildcard round 2nd wildcard round	Air21 94, Purefoods 82*; San Miguel 105, Air21 86*
2008-09	Fiesta Conference	Burger King Titans	4th/10	14	8	6	.571	3	Wildcard phase Quarterfinals; Semifinals; 3rd-place playoff	Burger King 96, Alaska 90*; Burger King 2, Sta. Lucia 1 San Miguel 4, Burger King 2 Burger King 132, Rain or Shine 118*
2008-09	Fiesta Conference	Burger King Whoppers	4th/10	14	8	6	.571	3	Wildcard phase Quarterfinals; Semifinals; 3rd-place playoff	Burger King 96, Alaska 90*; Burger King 2, Sta. Lucia 1 San Miguel 4, Burger King 2 Burger King 132, Rain or Shine 118*
2009-10	Philippine Cup	Burger King Whoppers	8th/10	18	6	12	.222	9	1st wildcard round	Coca-Cola 118, Burger King 112*
2009-10	Fiesta Conference	Air21 Express	9th/10	18	4	14	11	.222	1st wildcard round	Rain or Shine 92, Air21 89
Elimination round				226	98	128	.434	—	4 post-wildcard appearances	
Playoffs				62	31	31	.500	—	1 Finals appearances	
Cumulative records				288	129	159	.448	—	0 championships	

*one-game playoffs
**team had the twice-to-beat advantage

== Three-conference era ==
Season	Conference	Team name	Elimination round						Playoffs	
Season	Conference	Team name	Finish	GP	W	L	PCT	GB	Stage	Results
2010–11	Philippine Cup	Air21 Express	7th/10	14	6	8	.428	5	Quarterfinals	San Miguel** 95, Air21 75
2010–11	Commissioner's Cup	Air21 Express	4th/10	9	5	4	.556	3	Quarterfinals; Semifinals	Air21 2, Alaska 1 Talk 'N Text 3, Air21 0
2010–11	Governors Cup	Air21 Express	9th/9	8	0	8	.000	6	Did not qualify	
2011–12	Philippine Cup	Barako Bull Energy	7th/10	14	6	8	.429	4	Quarterfinals	Talk 'N Text** 81, Barako Bull 79
2011–12	Commissioner's Cup	Barako Bull Energy	5th/10	9	4	5	.444	3	Quarterfinals; Semifinals	Barako Bull 2, Alaska 1 Talk 'N Text 3, Barako Bull 2
2011–12	Governors Cup	Barako Bull Energy	7th/10	9	4	5	.444	4	1st elim. playoff	Powerade 99, Barako Bull 95*
2012–13	Philippine Cup	Barako Bull Energy Cola	9th/10	14	4	10	.286	8	Did not qualify	
2012–13	Commissioner's Cup	Barako Bull Energy Cola	9th/10	14	5	9	.357	6	Did not qualify	
2012–13	Governors Cup	Barako Bull Energy	6th/10	9	4	5	.444	4	Quarterfinals	Meralco** 86. Barako Bull 68
2013–14	Philippine Cup	Barako Bull Energy	6th/10	14	5	9	.357	6	Quarterfinals	Petron 2, Barako Bull 0
2013–14	Commissioner's Cup	Barako Bull Energy	9th/10	9	2	7	.222	7	Did not qualify	
2013–14	Governors Cup	Barako Bull Energy	8th/10	9	3	6	.333	4	Quarterfinals	Talk 'N Text** def. Barako Bull in 1 game
2014–15	Philippine Cup	Barako Bull Energy	9th/12	11	4	7	.364	5	Quarterfinals	1st Phase: Talk 'N Text* def. Barako Bull in 1 game
2014–15	Commissioner's Cup	Barako Bull Energy	7th/12	11	5	6	.455	3	Quarterfinals	Talk 'N Text** def. Barako Bull in 1 game
2014–15	Governors Cup	Barako Bull Energy	6th/12	11	6	5	.545	2	Quarterfinals	Rain or Shine** def. Barako Bull in 1 game
2015–16	Philippine Cup	Barako Bull Energy	8th/12	11	5	6	.455	4	Quarterfinals	1st Phase: GlobalPort* def. Barako Bull in 1 game
Elimination round				176	68	108	.386	—	2 semifinal appearances	
Playoffs				26	7	19	.269	—	0 Finals appearances	
Cumulative records				202	75	127	.371	—	0 championships	

*one-game playoffs
**team had the twice-to-beat advantage

== Cumulative records ==
Era	GP	W	L	PCT
Three-conference era (1975-2003)	75	34	41	.453
Two-conference era (2004-2010)	288	129	159	.448
Three-conference era (2010-2015)	202	75	127	.371
Total	565	238	327	.421
