= Elmer Espiritu =

Filipino basketball player

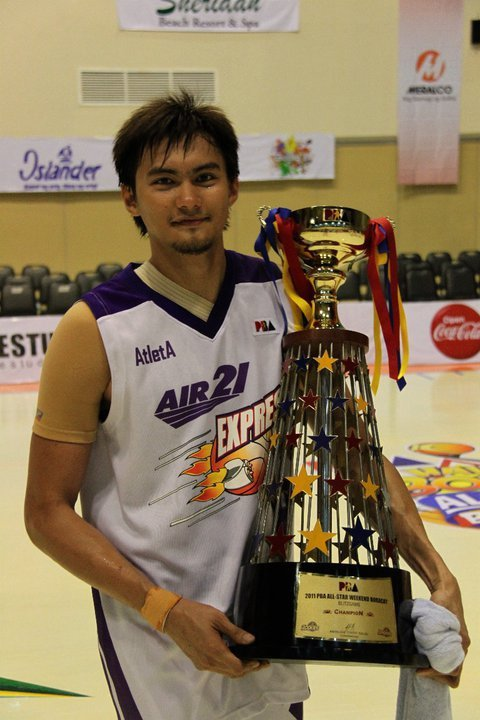

Personal information
- Born: November 23, 1985 (age 40)
- Listed height: 6 ft 4 in (1.93 m)
- Listed weight: 185 lb (84 kg)

Career information
- High school: JRU (Mandaluyong)
- College: JRU (2003); UE (2005-2009)
- PBA draft: 2010: 1st round, 4th overall pick
- Drafted by: Talk 'N Text Tropang Texters
- Playing career: 2009–2015
- Position: Small forward / power forward

Career history
- 2009–2010: Philippine Patriots
- 2010–2011: Alaska Aces
- 2011: Air21 Express
- 2011–2012: Shopinas.com Clickers
- 2012–2013: Barangay Ginebra San Miguel
- 2013–2014: Air21 Express
- 2014–2015: Talk 'N Text Tropang Texters

Career highlights
- PBA champion (2015 Commissioner's); ABL champion (2010); UAAP Mythical First Team (2009); UAAPDefensive Player (2009)

Elmer Torres Espiritu (born November 23, 1985) is a Filipino former professional basketball player who last played for Talk 'N Text Tropang Texters of the Philippine Basketball Association (PBA). He played five seasons for the University of the East Red Warriors in the University Athletic Association of the Philippines from 2005 to 2009. He captained the Warriors team that finished runner-up to the Ateneo de Manila Blue Eagles in the 2009 season, where he averaged 13.9 points, 7.5 rebounds and 2.6 blocks per game while winning two with the Highlight Player of the Year and the Defensive Player trophies.

== Professional career ==
=== Alaska Aces ===
He was selected by the Alaska Aces as 4th pick overall in the 2010 PBA draft. However, Espiritu played limited minutes in the stacked Alaska squad, averaging only 4.2 minutes per game, 0.6 points per game, and 0.3 assists in his only 9 games in the Alaska Aces.

=== Air21 Express (first era) ===
On May 15, 2011, Espiritu was traded to the Air21 Express for Wesley Gonzales for the 2011 Governors' Cup after the Express and the Alaska Aces formally agreed in a trade.

=== Shopinas.com Clickers ===
On September 6, 2011, Espiritu, along with Brian Ilad, was traded from Barako Bull to the Shopinas.com Clickers in a trade that also involved Mark Barroca and Don Allado.

=== Barangay Ginebra San Miguel ===
On August 23, 2012, Espiritu was traded by Air21 to the Barangay Ginebra San Miguel along with a 2013 draft first round selection (who turned out to be Greg Slaughter) through a three-team trade.

=== Air21 Express (second era) ===
Espiritu was acquired by the second era Air21 Express (formerly Shopinas.com Clickers) from Ginebra in exchange for a 2013 first-round pick that originally belonged to Talk 'N Text.

=== Talk 'N Text Tropang Texters ===
In March 2014, Espiritu was signed by the Talk 'N Text Tropang Texters.

== PBA career statistics ==
Legend
GP	Games played	MPG	Minutes per game
FG%	Field-goal percentage	3P%	3-point field-goal percentage	FT%	Free-throw percentage
RPG	Rebounds per game	APG	Assists per game	SPG	Steals per game
BPG	Blocks per game	PPG	Points per game	**Bold**	Career high

Correct as of August 2, 2015

=== Season-by-season averages ===
Year	Team	GP	MPG	FG%	3P%	FT%	RPG	APG	SPG	BPG	PPG
2010–11	Alaska / Air 21	17	8.6	.342	.000	.444	1.9	.2	.1	.3	1.9
2011–12	Shopinas.com	**27**	**24.0**	.361	.312	.600	**5.2**	**1.1**	**.2**	**.7**	**7.0**
2012–13	Barangay Ginebra	25	9.4	.333	.217	**.714**	1.7	.4	.1	.0	2.4
2013–14	Air21	16	8.0	.375	.500	.500	1.0	.4	.1	.1	2.4
2014–15	Talk 'N Text	16	3.8	**.478**	**.600**	.000	.5	.1	.0	.2	1.8
Career		101	12.1	.362	.350	.592	2.4	.5	.1	.3	3.5
