= Mark Isip =

Filipino basketball player

FEU Tamaraws
- Title: Assistant coach
- League: UAAP

Personal information
- Born: December 10, 1980 (age 45)
- Listed height: 6 ft 4 in (1.93 m)
- Listed weight: 215 lb (98 kg)

Career information
- College: FEU
- PBA draft: 2006: 1st round, 6th overall pick
- Drafted by: Sta. Lucia Realtors
- Playing career: 2006–2019
- Position: Power forward
- Coaching career: 2019–present

Career history

Playing
- 2006–2007: Sta. Lucia Realtors
- 2007–2008: Coca-Cola Tigers
- 2008–2009: Rain or Shine Elasto Painters
- 2009–2010: Talk 'N Text Tropang Texters
- 2010: Barako Bull Energy Boosters
- 2010–2012: Meralco Bolts
- 2012–2013: Air21 Express
- 2013: Petron Blaze Boosters
- 2013–2014: Barako Bull Energy
- 2014–2016: GlobalPort Batang Pier
- 2018–2019: Makati Skyscrapers / Super Crunch

Coaching
- 2019–present: FEU (assistant)

Mark Gracer P. Isip (born December 10, 1980 ) is a Filipino professional basketball coach and former player. Isip played college basketball for the FEU Tamaraws, where he is currently an assistant coach. He was then drafted sixth overall by the Sta. Lucia Realtors in the 2006 PBA draft and played ten seasons in the Philippine Basketball Association (PBA).

Isip only played limited minutes in his first few years until he played for the Barako Bull Energy Boosters during most of the 2010–11 PBA Philippine Cup where he had a number of double-double performances. In 2014, he was traded to GlobalPort for Jondan Salvador.

Isip also played in the Maharlika Pilipinas Basketball League (MPBL) for the Makati Skyscrapers (later the Makati Super Crunch).

== PBA career statistics ==
Legend
GP	Games played	MPG	Minutes per game
FG%	Field-goal percentage	3P%	3-point field-goal percentage	FT%	Free-throw percentage
RPG	Rebounds per game	APG	Assists per game	SPG	Steals per game
BPG	Blocks per game	PPG	Points per game	**Bold**	Career high

=== Season-by-season averages ===
Year	Team	GP	MPG	FG%	3P%	FT%	RPG	APG	SPG	BPG	PPG
2006–07	Sta. Lucia	45	12.7	.493	.000	.609	2.4	.2	.2	.1	3.8
2007–08	Coca-Cola / Welcoat	35	10.5	.431	.000	.632	2.4	.2	.1	.1	3.0
2008–09	Rain or Shine	**46**	15.2	.490	.091	.741	3.5	.3	.0	.1	6.4
2009–10	Talk N' Text / Barako Bull	18	10.1	**.500**	.000	.750	2.2	.4	.2	.1	5.1
2010–11	Barako Bull / Meralco	32	**24.3**	.450	.000	.699	**5.6**	.6	**.3**	.1	**11.5**
2011–12	Meralco	34	20.9	.462	.000	.682	4.2	.6	.2	**.2**	7.3
2012–13	Air21	38	21.7	.466	.143	.780	4.1	**.8**	.1	**.2**	8.1
2013–14	Barako Bull	24	15.3	.386	.000	**.800**	3.0	.5	.2	**.2**	5.3
2014–15	GlobalPort	34	17.0	.407	.333	.780	4.1	.2	.2	.1	5.3
2015–16	GlobalPort	8	7.9	**.500**	**.500**	.000	1.3	.3	.0	.0	2.8
Career		314	16.4	.456	.194	.720	3.5	.4	.2	.1	6.1
