= Centro Escolar Las Piñas =

Private school in Las Piñas, Philippines

- Former name: Las Piñas College (1979–2015)
- Motto: Ciencia Y Virtud
- Motto in English: Science and Virtue
- Type: Private Non-sectarian basic and higher education institution
- Established: June 1973; 53 years ago
- President: Dr. Ma. Cristina D. Padolina
- Vice-president: Dr. Teresa R. Perez (VP for Academic Affairs); Ma. Rolina S. Servitillo (VP for Administration and Accounting)
- Principal: Celia R. Lamarca, MAEd. (Basic Education)
- Location: Almanza Uno, Las Piñas, Metro Manila, Philippines; 14°25′33″N 121°00′47″E
- Alma Mater song: Centro Escolar Hymn
- Colors: Pink & Grey
- Nicknames: Escolarians; Escolarina / Escolarino
- Mascot: Blue Lions
- Website: www.celp.edu.ph

- Location in Metro Manila Location in Luzon Location in the Philippines

Centro Escolar Las Piñas (CELP; formerly known as Las Piñas College), is a school located in Pilar Village, Almanza Uno, Las Piñas, Metro Manila, Philippines. The school was founded in 1973, when Dr. Faustino Legaspi Uy opened a School of Nursing under the Graduate of Nursing (GN) Program at the Las Piñas General Hospital – that eventually became Dr. Faustino L. Uy Medical Foundation – as the clinical division. Initially created to provide a nursing program, over the years the school has expanded to provide kindergarten, primary and secondary schooling, along with several bachelors programs and a masters program. It was acquired by Centro Escolar University in 2015 and now serves as a satellite campus of the university.

== History ==
Faustino Legaspi Uy's belief that the community would best be served by combining health care and education formed the basis for founding Las Piñas College. Classes began in June 1975 with courses and programs in kindergarten, elementary, and high school teaching, nursing, the first two years of Liberal Arts, and vocational courses such as automotive repair, dressmaking, tailoring and general clerical. In 1977, the GN Program in the nursing school was phased out and replaced by the Bachelor of Science in Nursing (BSN) Program. Likewise, the two-year Junior Secretarial Course was first offered.

In June 1979, the first two years of Business Administration and Engineering, including the two-year Architectural Drafting, were offered under the aegis of what was at the time, the Ministry of Education, Culture and Sports (MECS); and now the Commission on Higher Education (CHED) working together with the Technical Education Skills Development Authority (TESDA), which oversees the technical and vocational programs.

By the 1982–1983 school year, the department of Education, Culture and Sports allowed the institution to offer a two-year Hotel and Restaurant Management course. That year, the Doña Guillermina Building was completed and construction on the Administrative Building started. In preparation for the college's expansion to become a university, LPC worked to qualify for permission to offer a graduate course in business, leading to a Master's program in Business Administration, but the founder died before this came to be.

Under the management and supervision of the founder's widow, Doctor Luz Co Uy, Las Piñas College earned the recognition permits to offer a Bachelor of Science in Industrial Engineering and in Civil Engineering from CHED in 1993. Later offerings at the B.S. level include Mechanical Engineering, and Accountancy; two-year programs include Nursing Assistant, Computer Secretarial and Technology courses, Office Management and other programs.

By September 2015, Centro Escolar University acquired Las Piñas College. The school is currently being run by Centro Escolar University and undergoing significant renovations to date.

Centro Escolar Las Piñas was granted by CHED the permit to offer a Bachelor of Science in Entrepreneurship (BS-ENT) starting in the school year 2018–2019.

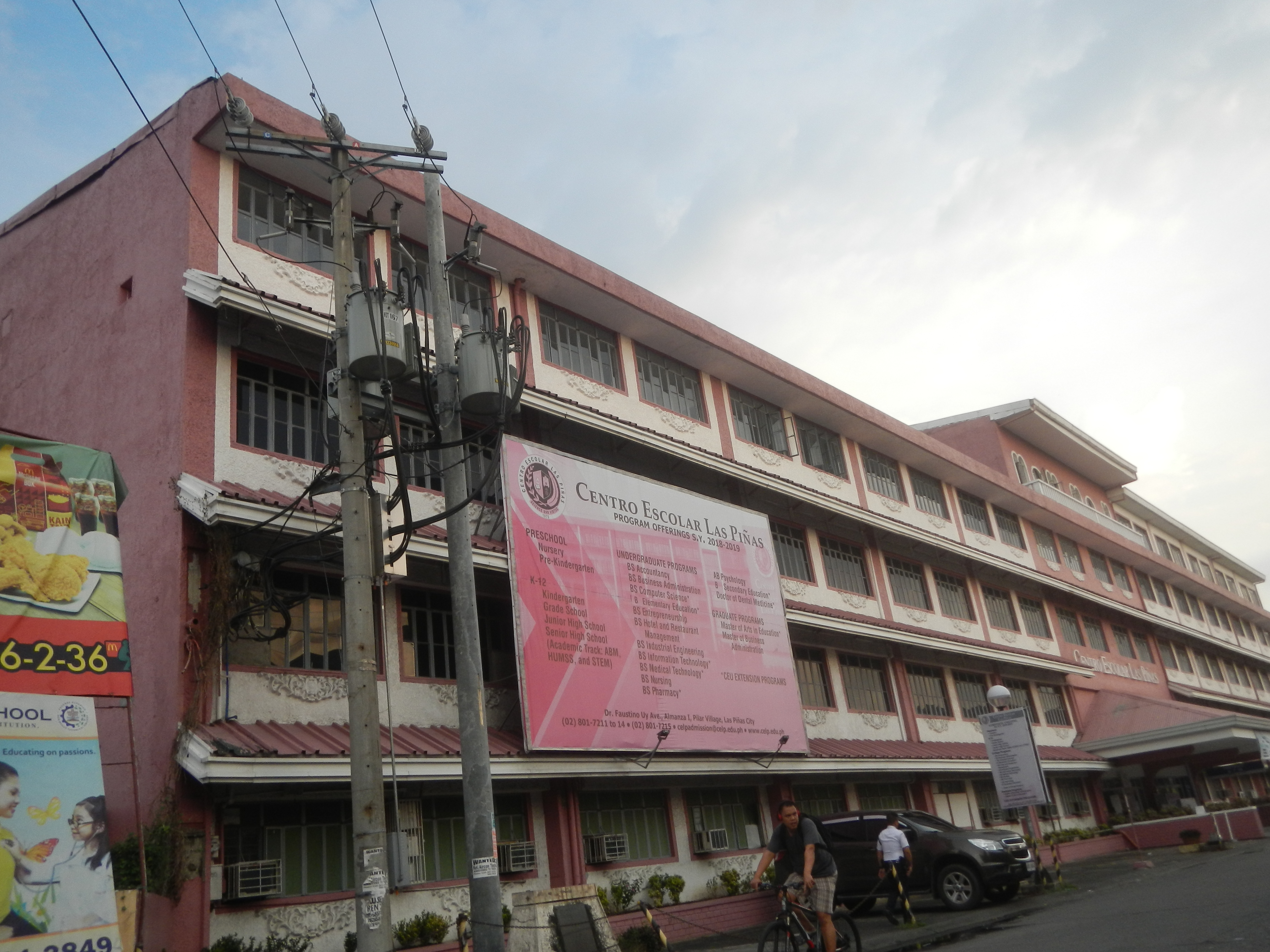
Facade in September 2018

== Available education ==
=== Basic education ===
Principal: Mrs. Celia R. Lamarca, MAEd.

- K to 12

=== College courses ===
NON-SCIENCE PROGRAMS Program Head: Dr. Frederick A. Halcon

- Bachelor of Science in Accountancy
- Bachelor of Science in Business Administration
- Bachelor of Science in Entrepreneurship
- Bachelor of Science in Hospitality Management

SCIENCE PROGRAMS Dean of Studies: Dr. Leonila C. Abella

- Bachelor of Science in Psychology
- Bachelor of Science in Nursing
- Bachelor of Science in Medical Technology
- Bachelor of Science in Pharmacy
- Bachelor of Early Childhood Education
- Bachelor of Secondary Education

=== Graduate programs ===
- Master in Business Administration
- Master of Arts in Education
- Doctor of Dental Medicine
