= Hans Thiele =

Filipino basketball player

Personal information
- Born: February 2, 1984 (age 42) Boracay, Philippines
- Listed height: 6 ft 5 in (1.96 m)
- Listed weight: 200 lb (91 kg)

Career information
- College: UE
- PBA draft: 2010: Undrafted
- Playing career: 2010–2021
- Position: Power forward / center

Career history
- 2010: Barako Bull Energy Boosters
- 2010–2011: Meralco Bolts
- 2011–2012: Alaska Aces
- 2013: San Miguel Beermen (ABL)
- 2013: GlobalPort Batang Pier
- 2013–2014: Barako Bull Energy
- 2014–2015: Kia Sorento / Kia Carnival
- 2016–2017: Alab Pilipinas
- 2018–2019: Bulacan Kuyas
- 2019–2021: Zamboanga Family's Brand Sardines

Career highlights
- ABL champion (2013)

Hans Paul Franz T. Thiele is a Filipino former professional basketball player.

== Professional career ==
Thiele was signed by the Barako Bull Energy Boosters in 2010 as a free agent after going undrafted. He was then traded to the Meralco Bolts for Dennis Daa.

Before the 2011 PBA Commissioner's Cup, he and Paolo Bugia were traded to the Alaska Aces for Reynel Hugnatan.

In August 2012, Thiele was traded to the Petron Blaze Boosters in a five-team trade.

In early 2013, Thiele was sent down by Petron Blaze to the San Miguel Beermen of the ASEAN Basketball League for the 2013 ABL season.

After the 2013 ABL season, he was signed by GlobalPort Batang Pier.

On November 4, 2013, Thiele was traded with Willie Miller to the Barako Bull Energy for Enrico Villanueva.

In 2014, Thiele was released by Barako Bull to the 2014 PBA Expansion Draft, where he was picked sixth by Kia Sorento.

In November 2014, Thiele was released by Kia. However, he was signed again by the team a couple of weeks after being released. In the end of the 2014–15 PBA season, he was released again by the team.

== PBA career statistics ==
Legend
GP	Games played	MPG	Minutes per game
FG%	Field-goal percentage	3P%	3-point field-goal percentage	FT%	Free-throw percentage
RPG	Rebounds per game	APG	Assists per game	SPG	Steals per game
BPG	Blocks per game	PPG	Points per game	**Bold**	Career high

Correct as of September 27, 2015

=== Season-by-season averages ===
Year	Team	GP	MPG	FG%	3P%	FT%	RPG	APG	SPG	BPG	PPG
2010–11	Barako Bull / Alaska Aces	21	**19.2**	.473	.000	.438	**5.2**	**.7**	.2	**.4**	**5.7**
2011–12	Alaska	3	3.7	.000	.000	.000	1.3	.0	.0	.0	.0
2012–13	GlobalPort	3	4.3	.333	.000	**1.000**	.7	.0	**.3**	.3	1.3
2013–14	Barako Bull	8	8.5	**.588**	.000	.800	1.3	.3	.1	.0	3.0
2014–15	Kia	**26**	14.0	.367	**.235**	.595	3.6	.4	.2	.3	4.6
Career		61	14.1	.425	.211	.553	3.6	.4	.2	.3	4.4
