= UAAP Season 72 men's basketball tournament =

Basketball competition in the Philippines

UAAP Season 72
- Host school: Far Eastern University
Men's Finals	G1	G2	G3	Wins
Ateneo Blue Eagles	78	68	71	2
UE Red Warriors	71	88	58	1
- Duration: October 1–8, 2009
- Arena(s): Araneta Coliseum
- Finals MVP: Rabeh Al-Hussaini
- Winning coach: Norman Black
- Semifinalists: FEU Tamaraws; UST Growling Tigers
- TV network(s): Studio 23, The Filipino Channel, Balls HD

The UAAP Season 72 men's basketball tournament is the University Athletic Association of the Philippines (UAAP)'s men's basketball tournament for the 2009–10 season.

The Ateneo Blue Eagles qualified for their second consecutive Finals appearance after amassing a 13–1 elimination round record (only loss coming from last-placed UP Fighting Maroons), and beating 2006 Finals opponent UST Growling Tigers in the semifinals. Their opponent, the UE Red Warriors, finished third in the elimination round, and had to defeat the FEU Tamaraws twice in the semifinals in order to qualify. After both teams split the first two games, Ateneo went on to beat UE in Game 3, 71–58, to win their second straight title. Ateneo's Rabeh Al-Hussaini won the Finals MVP honors.

The tournament host is Far Eastern University, which led the opening ceremonies on July 11 at the Araneta Coliseum. ABS-CBN UHF channel Studio 23 broadcast all of the games, including the Final Four and Finals.

== Teams ==
Team	School	Coach
Adamson Soaring Falcons	Adamson University	Leo Austria
Ateneo Blue Eagles	Ateneo de Manila University	Norman Black
De La Salle Green Archers	De La Salle University	Franz Pumaren
FEU Tamaraws	Far Eastern University	Glenn Capacio
NU Bulldogs	National University	Manny Dandan
UE Red Warriors	University of the East	Lawrence Chongson
UP Fighting Maroons	University of the Philippines Diliman	Aboy Castro
UST Growling Tigers	University of Santo Tomas	Pido Jarencio

=== Coaching changes ===
Team	Old coach	Reason	New coach
UE	Dindo Pumaren	Resignation	Lawrence Chongson

== Preseason ==
In two key preseason tournaments, the FEU Tamaraws advanced in the semifinals of both the Nike Summer League and the Filoil Flying V Cup. In the Nike Summer League, the Tamaraws were beaten by 3-time NCAA champions San Beda Red Lions 74–72 in the semifinals en route to their championship. In the Filoil Flying V Cup, the Tamaraws held off fellow UAAP team UE Red Warriors in the final 84–78 to win the championship.

With NCAA Season 84 commissioner Joe Lipa at the helm, new rules were set up:

- Instituting a more thorough system in breaking ties after the elimination round to determine seedings,
- Teams may now challenge the validity of a three-point field goal at any point of the game via instant replay,
- During the final two minutes of a game, and in all overtimes, a jump ball will settle all jump ball situations, with the players in question participating in a jump ball similar to the start of the game. The possession arrow is discarded.

Those which were retained are:

- The adhesive pro-grip is still banned.
- Teams are still limited to two foreign nationals in their rosters, with only one allowed to play at a time.

League president Anton Montinola of Far Eastern University said that the method in breaking ties will use "common sense" as the tournament is prolonged by holding unnecessary matches.

Due to the high demand of tickets for Ateneo-La Salle games, host FEU has devised a way for allocating tickets for fans of the two schools, although the Ateneo-La Salle game will still be a part of a doubleheader, tickets will be sold separately for the Ateneo-La Salle and the following FEU-UE game. The patrons who only have tickets for one game has to watch only the game stated on their tickets and has to leave when the other game is being held. The two-hour gap between the games was to allow Araneta Coliseum personnel to clear the arena for the second game. During last year's finals series between Ateneo and La Salle, the crowd was estimated to be at least 22,000.

== Elimination round ==
=== Team standings ===
Pos	Team	W	L	PCT	GB	Qualification
1	Ateneo Blue Eagles	13	1	.929	—	Twice-to-beat in the semifinals
2	FEU Tamaraws (H)	11	3	.786	2	Twice-to-beat in the semifinals
3	UE Red Warriors	10	4	.714	3	Twice-to-win in the semifinals
4	UST Growling Tigers	6	8	.429	7	Twice-to-win in the semifinals
5	Adamson Soaring Falcons	5	9	.357 (Note: Head-to-head record: Adamson 1–1 La Salle (Adamson +5))	8	
6	De La Salle Green Archers	5	9	.357	8	
7	NU Bulldogs	3	11	.214 (Note: Head-to-head record: NU 1–1 UP (NU +8))	10	
8	UP Fighting Maroons	3	11	.214	10	

Source: ABS-CBN Sports
Rules for classification: 1) winning percentage; 2) if tied for #2 or #4, one-game playoff; 3) head-to-head record; 4) head-to-head point differential; 5) overall point differential
(H) Hosts

=== Schedule ===
	Round 1							Round 2						
Team ╲ Game	1	2	3	4	5	6	7	8	9	10	11	12	13	14
Adamson	UST school colors	UP school colors	FEU school colors	La Salle school colors	Ateneo school colors	UE school colors	NU school colors	La Salle school colors	UE school colors	NU school colors	FEU school colors	Ateneo school colors	UST school colors	UP school colors
Ateneo	FEU school colors	UE school colors	UST school colors	UP school colors	Adamson school colors	NU school colors	La Salle school colors	UE school colors	La Salle school colors	UST school colors	NU school colors	Adamson school colors	UP school colors	FEU school colors
La Salle	UE school colors	FEU school colors	UP school colors	Adamson school colors	NU school colors	UST school colors	Ateneo school colors	Adamson school colors	Ateneo school colors	UP school colors	UE school colors	UST school colors	FEU school colors	NU school colors
FEU	Ateneo school colors	La Salle school colors	Adamson school colors	NU school colors	UP school colors	UST school colors	UE school colors	UST school colors	NU school colors	UE school colors	Adamson school colors	UP school colors	La Salle school colors	Ateneo school colors
NU	UP school colors	UST school colors	UE school colors	FEU school colors	La Salle school colors	Ateneo school colors	Adamson school colors	UP school colors	FEU school colors	Adamson school colors	Ateneo school colors	UST school colors	UE school colors	La Salle school colors
UE	La Salle school colors	Ateneo school colors	NU school colors	UST school colors	Adamson school colors	UP school colors	FEU school colors	Ateneo school colors	Adamson school colors	FEU school colors	La Salle school colors	UP school colors	NU school colors	UST school colors
UP	NU school colors	Adamson school colors	La Salle school colors	Ateneo school colors	FEU school colors	UE school colors	UST school colors	NU school colors	UST school colors	La Salle school colors	FEU school colors	UE school colors	Ateneo school colors	Adamson school colors
UST	Adamson school colors	NU school colors	Ateneo school colors	UE school colors	La Salle school colors	FEU school colors	UP school colors	FEU school colors	UP school colors	Ateneo school colors	NU school colors	La Salle school colors	Adamson school colors	UE school colors

= Win; = OT win; = Loss; = OT loss

=== Results ===
:Results to the right and top of the gray cells are first round games, those to the left and below are second round games.

Team	AdU	ADMU	DLSU	FEU	NU	UE	UP	UST
Adamson Soaring Falcons		51–61	63–64*	60–63	70–76	91–95**	72–68	75–76
Ateneo Blue Eagles	61–52		76–72*	63–59	75–47	72–57	58–68	93–77
De La Salle Green Archers	55–61	65–81		51–65	68–48	46–65	73–63	101–92**
FEU Tamaraws	84–75	73–74	71–69*		82–57	76–72	75–67	90–63
NU Bulldogs	50–79	54–75	63–61	66–76		59–73	74–64	89–104
UE Red Warriors	60–56	75–80	66–64	87–72	70–58		77–69*	88–92
UP Fighting Maroons	61–74	75–93	83–78	74–86	78–76	72–81		85–95
UST Growling Tigers	64–83	70–80	64–68	67–75	79–58	67–77	93–88	

Legend: Blue = left column team win; Red = top row team win.
Matches with lighter background shading were decided after overtime.

=== Postseason teams ===
Ateneo and UE continue their streaks of playoff appearances. FEU made its return for the second time since last year as UST returned from the playoffs after missing it last year. The De La Salle Green Archers missed the playoffs for the first time in Final Four history after losing to the NU Bulldogs on their last game of the eliminations that ended their streak of Final Four appearance at 14 and were the first runner-up that not to qualify for the semifinals.

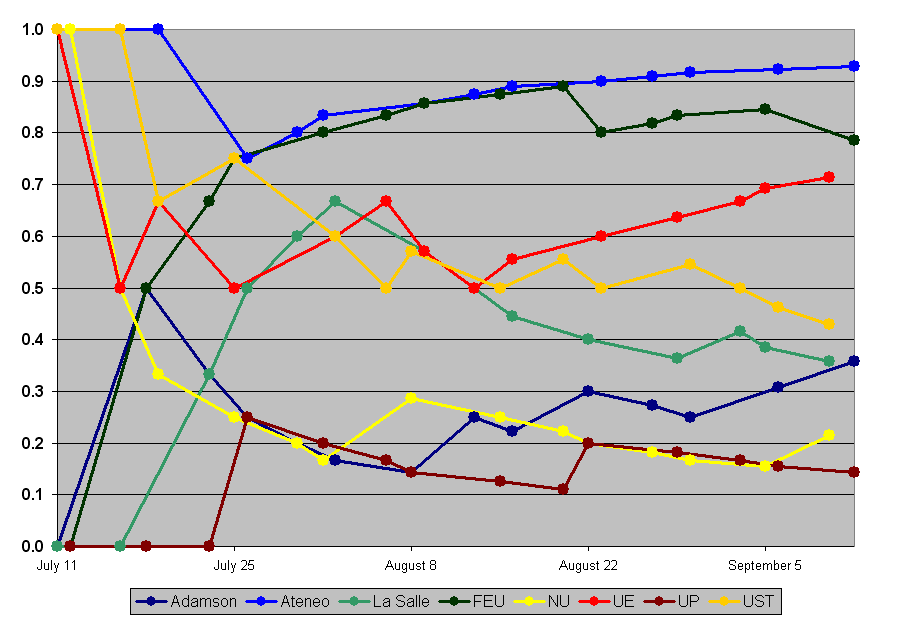
Team standings progression.

==== Ateneo Blue Eagles ====
The Eagles opened the season with a win against FEU to begin the defense of their crown. On their second game against UE, they rallied from a 17-point deficit in the first half to win 72-57, and then they demolished UST with Emman Monfort doing the most damage to the Growling Tigers with his 6 treys and a career-high 20 points. However, they were beaten by their Katipunan rivals the UP Fighting Maroons. After that loss, Ateneo is on a winning mode once again as they beat Adamson, NU, and La Salle in overtime to end the first round with a 6-1 win–loss record. During the second round, Ateneo continued their rampage once again highlighted by a win against UP, avenging their only loss for the season and assuring them of the twice to beat advantage in the playoffs. The Eagles completed a sweep of the second round with a victory over the FEU Tamaraws in the elimination round finale, despite FEU leading by as much as 18, as Ateneo chipped the lead and led a late surge to lead at the final buzzer to deny the Tamaraws a #1 seed.

==== FEU Tamaraws ====
The host were beaten by the Ateneo Blue Eagles on opening day but rebounded with a win against last year's runner-up La Salle. The Tamaraws continued their striking distance and rejoining Ateneo in the team standings as the Tamaraws went to an amazing 8-game winning streak. However, they were dealt with their first setback(second overall) in their second round game against UE, but rebounded with wins against Adamson, UP, and La Salle (which needed a win to stay in contention) in overtime, dashing UE's hopes of a twice to beat advantage in the semis, and to set up a virtual game for the #1 seed against Ateneo (FEU had to win by 5 points or more to clinch #1) in the elimination round finale. The Tamaraws were beaten by 1 point after leading as much as 18 that deny a #1 seed and facing the UE Red Warriors anew in the semis.

==== UE Red Warriors ====
The Warriors blew out last year's losing finalist and 2007 finals nemesis La Salle 65-46 but they were demolished by Ateneo on their next game after giving up a 17-point lead in the first half. They rebounded with a win against NU and they lost once again against UST that put them again at .500. UE went on a 2-game winning streak that went into overtimes against Adamson and UP but they lost 2-straight against FEU in the first round finale and Ateneo at the start of the second round. UE swept their last 6 games to have a shot for at least a second twice to beat advantage, as they beat Adamson, FEU (halting the Tamaraws' winning streak at 8), La Salle (extending the Green Archers' losing skid to 5), UP (eliminating the Fighting Maroons in the playoffs), NU and UST. The Warriors got the #3 seed towards the semis, and UE had a twice to win disadvantage against FEU.

==== UST Growling Tigers ====
The Tigers opened the season with 2-straight wins against Adamson and NU but were blown out by Ateneo in their next game. Then they rebounded with a win against UE. UST lost 2-straight against FEU and La Salle that went into double overtime. They ended the first round with a win against a cellar dwelling UP to end with a 4-3 win–loss record and a 3-way tie in the 3rd spot with UE and La Salle in the standings. They opened the second round with another loss to FEU, then they rebounded with a win against UP with the Maroons having a late comeback. UST lost to Ateneo on their next game but won against NU to make sure that they will have a spot at least for the #4 seed. The Tigers went on a 3-game losing skid with a blow out loss to already out Adamson, La Salle (which needed a win to stay in contention), and UE. The Tigers qualified in the semis despite losing its last 3 games of the elimination and also thanks to NU's upset of La Salle early in that day. UST faced Ateneo in the semis.

== Bracket ==
Semifinals (Top 2 twice-to-beat)
1	Ateneo	81
4	UST	64
2	FEU	74	72
3	UE	84	78

Finals (Best-of-three playoff)
1	Ateneo	78	68	71
3	UE	71	88	58

== Semifinals ==
FEU and Ateneo have the twice-to-beat advantage. They only have to win once, while their opponents, twice, to progress.

=== Ateneo vs. UST ===
Studio 23

September 20
3:30 p.m.

Ateneo Blue Eagles	81–64	UST Growling Tigers
Scoring by quarter: 22–16, 18–15, 23–13, 18–20
Pts: Jai Reyes 17; Rebs: Al-Hussaini, Buenafe 7 each Asts: Al-Hussaini, Salamat 5 each		Pts: Dylan Ababou 19; Rebs: Khasim Mirza 11; Asts: Jeric Fortuna 4
Ateneo wins series in one game

Araneta Coliseum, Quezon City

UST hung around early in the game, but due to their turnovers throughout the game, with Eric Salamat making key steals, the Eagles built upon a huge lead with uncontested fastbreak lay-ups, as evidenced by a staggering a field-goal percentage of 50.8%. Jai Reyes scored 17 points, nine from behind the three-point line, to lead the Eagles back into the Finals. Ryan Buenafe added 15 points. Tigers coach Pido Jarencio blamed the loss to poor execution; season MVP Dylan Ababou scored 19 points and grabbed 8 rebounds in a losing effort to cap off his last UAAP game.

=== FEU vs. UE ===
Prior to the series being started, FEU co-captain Andy Barroca had come under fire for subpar performances on the last stretch of the eliminations, with accusations of game-fixing hurled against him. Barroca skipped FEU's last practice sessions, and was hurt by the accusations, which ultimately led him to unilaterally drop out of the FEU lineup for the rest of the season. FEU issued a statement prior to the game that Barroca won't play in Game 1 of their series against UE "with the objective of improving team chemistry," an official team statement said.

==== Game 1 ====
Studio 23

September 19
3:30 p.m.

FEU Tamaraws	74–84	UE Red Warriors
Scoring by quarter: 18–25, 20–12, 17–25, 19–22
Pts: Paul Sanga 22; Rebs: Aldrech Ramos 10; Asts: RR Garcia 6		Pts: Paul Lee 26; Rebs: Pari Llagas 12; Asts: Paul Lee 7
UE extends series

Araneta Coliseum, Quezon City

Armed with the twice-to-beat advantage, FEU stayed close with UE, even leading by a point at halftime. Val Acuña scored 11 of his 17 points in the first quarter as UE threatened to pull away. With FEU leading 50–46 late in the third quarter, Paul Lee scored eight consecutive points to close out the quarter with the Red Warriors leading 62–55. Paul Sanga, who had a career-high 22 points, scored a three-pointer to give FEU the lead, but Lee scored 16 of UE's last 18 points, including three consecutive three-pointers, in an 18–5 run that saw the Red Warriors pull ahead late in the fourth quarter. Lee ended the game with a career-high 26 points, together with 8 rebounds and 7 assists. Pari Llagas had a double-double performance to complement Lee's scoring, having 19 points and 12 rebounds.

==== Game 2 ====
Studio 23

September 24
3:30 p.m.

FEU Tamaraws	72–78	UE Red Warriors
Scoring by quarter: 27–19, 24–26, 13–16, 8–17
Pts: JR Cawaling 19; Rebs: Ramos, Cervantes 11 each Asts: RR Garcia 4		Pts: Lee, Acuña 17 each Rebs: Pari Llagas 11; Asts: Rudy Lingganay 4
UE wins series in two games

Araneta Coliseum, Quezon City

In the deciding semifinal game, FEU raced to a 27–15 lead in the first quarter, and a 49–39 lead in the second quarter, but lost steam in the second half. The Red Warriors relied on Lee and Pari Llagas, with Llagas scoring two field-goals to put UE up for good 72–70, and Lee scoring four crucial freethrows at the end of the game to seal UE's bid to face Ateneo in the Finals.

== Finals ==
Studio 23

October 1
3:30 p.m.

Ateneo Blue Eagles	78–71	UE Red Warriors
Scoring by quarter: 24–11, 10–24, 23–18, 21–18
Pts: Rabeh Al-Hussaini 28; Rebs: Rabeh Al-Hussaini 14; Asts: Jai Reyes 4		Pts: Paul Lee 15; Rebs: Val Acuña 11; Asts: Acuňa, Reyes, 3 each
Ateneo leads series, 1–0

Araneta Coliseum, Quezon City

Studio 23

October 4
3:30 p.m.

Ateneo Blue Eagles	68–88	UE Red Warriors
Scoring by quarter: 15–18, 25–20, 13–25, 15–25
Pts: Rabeh Al-Hussaini 18; Rebs: Baclao, Salva 8 each Asts: Jai Reyes 6		Pts: Elmer Espiritu 22; Rebs: Rudy Lingganay 8 Asts: Pari Llagas 5
Series tied, 1–1

Araneta Coliseum, Quezon City

Studio 23

October 8
3:30 p.m.

Ateneo Blue Eagles	71–58	UE Red Warriors
Scoring by quarter: 21–17, 19–8, 17–16, 14–17
Pts: Rabeh Al-Hussaini 21; Rebs: Rabeh Al-Hussaini 14; Asts: Jai Reyes 6		Pts: Paul Lee 21; Rebs: Paul Lee 12; Asts: Rudy Lingganay 3
Ateneo wins series, 2–1

Araneta Coliseum, Quezon City
Attendance: 18,851

- Finals Most Valuable Player: Rabeh Al-Hussaini (Ateneo Blue Eagles)

== Awards ==
UAAP Season 72 men's basketball champions
Ateneo Blue Eagles
Fifth title, second consecutive title
(19th title including NCAA championships)

Institutional awards:

- Most Valuable Player: Dylan Ababou (UST Growling Tigers)
- Rookie of the Year: Jeric Teng (UST Growling Tigers)
- Mythical Five:
  - Dylan Ababou (UST Growling Tigers)
  - Paul Lee (UE Red Warriors)
  - Rabeh Al-Hussaini (Ateneo Blue Eagles)
  - Aldrech Ramos (FEU Tamaraws)
  - Elmer Espiritu (UE Red Warriors)

Sponsored awards:

- Duo of the Season: Rabeh Al-Hussaini and Eric Salamat (Ateneo Blue Eagles)
- Most Reliable Player: Rabeh Al-Hussaini (Ateneo Blue Eagles)
- Sixth Man of the Year: Nico Salva (Ateneo Blue Eagles)
- Highlight Player of the Year: Elmer Espiritu (UE Red Warriors)
- Defensive Player of the Year: Elmer Espiritu (UE Red Warriors)
- Most Improved Player of the Year: Paul Lee (UE Red Warriors)
- Champ of the Season (Scoring champion): Dylan Ababou (UST Growling Tigers)
- Star Shooter (Best three point FG percentage): Jeric Fortuna (UST Growling Tigers)

== Broadcast notes ==
Studio 23 carried all games live. SkyCable Channel 166 (Balls HD) aired the finals series on high definition live, with Balls SD airing the replays. The Filipino Channel broadcast the series outside the Philippines.

Game	Play-by-play	Analyst	Courtside reporter
FEU–UE semifinals game 1	Eric Tipan	TJ Manotoc	Kryzelle O'Connor and Tiff Atendido
Ateneo–UST semifinals game 1	Boom Gonzalez	Luigi Trillo	Jessica Mendoza and Pach Cansana
FEU–UE semifinals game 2	Boom Gonzalez	TJ Manotoc	Kryzelle O'Connor and Tiff Atendido
Finals game 1	Boom Gonzalez	TJ Manotoc	Jessica Mendoza and Tiff Atendido
Finals game 2	Boom Gonzalez	TJ Manotoc	Jessica Mendoza and Tiff Atendido
Finals game 3	Boom Gonzalez	TJ Manotoc	Jessica Mendoza and Tiff Atendido

Preceded by Season 71 (2008)	UAAP basketball seasons Season 72 (2009) basketball	Succeeded by Season 73 (2010)
