= Nonoy Baclao =

Filipino basketball player (born 1987)

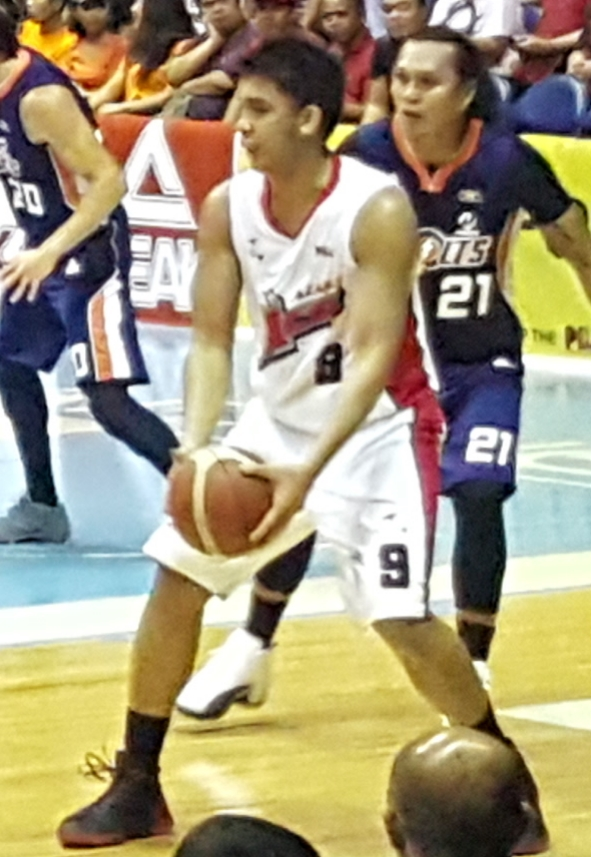
- Baclao with the Alaska Aces in 2016

Free agent
- Position: Center / power forward

Personal information
- Born: June 15, 1987 (age 39) Bacolod, Philippines
- Listed height: 6 ft 5 in (1.96 m)
- Listed weight: 190 lb (86 kg)

Career information
- High school: WNU High School (Bacolod)
- College: WNU (2005); Ateneo (2007–2009)
- PBA draft: 2010: 1st round1st overall
- Drafted by: Air21 Express
- Playing career: 2009–present

Career history
- 2009–2010: Philippine Patriots
- 2010–2011: Air21 Express
- 2011–2012: Petron Blaze Boosters
- 2012–2013: Air21 Express
- 2013: Meralco Bolts
- 2013–2014: Talk 'N Text Tropang Texters
- 2014–2015: GlobalPort Batang Pier
- 2015–2019: Alaska Aces
- 2021–2023: Meralco Bolts
- 2023–2024: San Miguel Beermen

Career highlights
- 2× PBA champion (2011 Governors', 2023–24 Commissioner's); PBA All-Rookie Team (2011); ABL champion (2010); 2× UAAP champion (2008, 2009); UAAP Finals Most Valuable Player (2008); UAAP Defensive Player of the Year UAAP Season 71; 2× PCCL champion (2007, 2009)

Siverino A. "Nonoy" Baclao Jr. (born June 15, 1987) is a Filipino professional basketball player who last played for the San Miguel Beermen of the Philippine Basketball Association (PBA). A forward who can also play center, he played three seasons for the Ateneo de Manila Blue Eagles in the University Athletic Association of the Philippines from 2007 to 2009 and led the Eagles to back-to-back basketball championships in his last two seasons with them. He also played for the Philippine Patriots in the ASEAN Basketball League and led the team as the inaugural champion of the 2009-10 ABL season. In the PBA, he made the All-Rookie Team and has won two championships.

== Early life ==
Baclao was born in Bacolod. Growing up, he played football. By the time he was 14 years old, he was 5'11". One day, when he was buying shoelaces, the coach of WNU High School spotted him and offered a spot on their varsity team without a tryout. He took their athletic scholarship to help his family.

== College career ==
Baclao attended the first few years of college at the West Negros University, where he led the WNU Mustangs to the 2005 National University Games (Unigames) crown in Bacolod City and the 2006 Basketball Association of the Philippines (BAP) National Students Championship (Inter-Collegiate) title. His reputation as a major defensive contributor, especially in blocking and rebounding, was noticed by Manila-based college scouts, and in 2006 he was recruited by Ateneo de Manila University.

After serving the mandatory one-year residency rule imposed by the University Athletic Association of the Philippines, Baclao made it to the Blue Eagles roster in the 2007 UAAP season, where he contributed to the team's defense, although they failed to make it to the Finals.

In 2008, he was designated as the team's co-captain, which he held until his last year of eligibility. He played a major role in the Blue Eagles' conquest of their archrivals, the De La Salle Green Archers in the 2008 UAAP Basketball championships. He was adjudged as the Finals MVP and the Smart Defensive Player of the Year. In his final UAAP season, where Baclao shared the captaincy with Jai Reyes and Rabeh Al-Hussaini, he averaged 6.4 points per game, 8.4 rebounds per game, 2.5 blocks per game, and 1.4 assists per game in 27.9 minutes per game, and was a key factor in the Eagles' defense of the UAAP title against the University of the East Red Warriors.

Baclao played for the Blue Eagles for one last time in the PCCL finals, helping them win the 2009 Philippine Collegiate Championship.

== Professional career ==
=== Philippine Patriots ===
Weeks after leading the Eagles to its second straight UAAP basketball championship, Baclao signed with the Philippine Patriots, the country's professional team playing for the ASEAN Basketball League. Coach Louie Alas saw him reprising his role he had with the Blue Eagles as he backstopped the team's defense. Baclao's superb clutch plays off the bench has helped the Patriots win games, especially their rematch against the Singapore Slingers in Manila on November 7, 2009, where they won, 70–53. After briefly returning to Ateneo for the PCCL finals, he made his return to the team against the Kuala Lumpur Dragons. The Patriots went on to win the title that season.

=== Air21 Express ===
Baclao became Air21 Express's top pick of the 2010 PBA Draft, a draft class that featured fellow Blue Eagles Al-Hussaini and Reyes. He was signed to a maximum three-year deal. He immediately made impact with his first team providing solid defense.

=== Petron Blaze Boosters ===
In 2011, Baclao, Al-Hussaini and Rey Guevarra were traded to the Petron Blaze Boosters for Danny Seigle, Dondon Hontiveros, Dorian Peña and Paul Artadi.

He was awarded as a member of the All-Rookie Team by season's end. On his second year, his minutes went down and was seldom used by the Boosters.

=== Air21 Express ===
During the 2012 off-season, he, along with Niño Canaleta, Robert Reyes and John Wilson were traded to the Air21 Express. Under Franz Pumaren, his play improved and he became more confident in his abilities. Against the team that drafted him, he scored a career-high 18 points with four rebounds, two assists, a steal, and a block. They qualified for the playoffs of the 2012–13 Philippine Cup, where they were stopped short of the semifinals by the Talk 'N Text Tropang Texters.

=== Meralco Bolts ===
At the start of 2013, Baclao found himself on the move once again as he and Wilson were traded for the Meralco Bolts' Vic Manuel, Carlo Sharma, and a 2016 second-round pick.

=== Talk 'N Text Tropang Texters ===
Baclao was again traded on October 13, 2013, in a three-team trade that involved Air21, Talk 'N Text, and Meralco, this time landing with the Talk 'N Text Tropang Texters.

=== GlobalPort Batang Pier ===
On September 22, 2014, Baclao and Harold Arboleda were traded to GlobalPort Batang Pier for Jay Washington. This trade is a part of a multiple team trade between GlobalPort, Talk 'N Text, and the NLEX Road Warriors. His usage went down in the 2015 Commissioner's Cup, as he played only four games and averaged .5 points and 3.5 rebounds in 10 minutes.

=== Alaska Aces ===
On March 14, 2015, GlobalPort traded Baclao and a 2017 first-round draft pick to the Alaska Aces in exchange for Gabby Espinas. In a Game 2 win of their Commissioner's Cup semifinal series against the Star Hotshots, he stepped up with 10 points and five rebounds. They went on to sweep Star and enter the Finals, but were swept themselves by the San Miguel Beermen. After the season, Alaska gave him a one-year contract extension. For the 2015–16 season, they made back-to-back Finals appearances, but lost each time.

In the opening game of the 2016–17 season, Baclao scored 12 points in a loss to NLEX, but injured his knee. He was not able to play for the entire Philippine Cup.

On August 29, 2018, eight years after he got drafted, Baclao had 15 points, 7 rebounds, 2 blocks and 2 assists in a win over the Phoenix Fuel Masters as they started the Governors' Cup 3–0. They went on to lose in the Finals once again.

In the first game of their 2019 Governors' Cup campaign, he injured his right knee. An MRI revealed that he had ruptured his patella tendon. After the season, Alaska did not renew his contract.

=== Meralco Bolts ===
In 2020, Baclao was signed by Meralco. As the 2020 season was held in a "bubble", he couldn't play for them as teams could only bring 15 players and he was still recovering at the time rosters had to be finalized. Despite not playing for them, Meralco signed him for another year. At the end of the 2022–23 season, Meralco released him.

=== San Miguel Beermen ===
Baclao played for the San Miguel Beermen during the PBA On Tour preseason games. On July 17, 2023, he officially signed with the Beermen. This is his second stint with the franchise, having last played with them in 2012 when the team was previously known as the Petron Blaze Boosters.

== PBA career statistics ==
Legend
| GP | Games played | MPG | Minutes per game |
| FG% | Field-goal percentage | 3P% | 3-point field-goal percentage | FT% | Free-throw percentage |
| RPG | Rebounds per game | APG | Assists per game | SPG | Steals per game |
| BPG | Blocks per game | PPG | Points per game | **Bold** | Career high |

As of the end of 2022–23 season

=== Season-by-season averages ===
| Year | Team | GP | MPG | FG% | 3P% | FT% | RPG | APG | SPG | BPG | PPG |
|---|---|---|---|---|---|---|---|---|---|---|---|
| 2010–11 | Air21 | 35 | **18.5** | .441 | .000 | .677 | **5.2** | **1.1** | .2 | **1.5** | 3.4 |
| 2010–11 | San Miguel / Petron | 35 | **18.5** | .441 | .000 | .677 | **5.2** | **1.1** | .2 | **1.5** | 3.4 |
| 2011–12 | Petron | 28 | 10.6 | .474 | .000 | .429 | 3.1 | .3 | .2 | .7 | 2.0 |
| 2012–13 | Air21 | 31 | 16.1 | .446 | .000 | .680 | 3.2 | .8 | .2 | .7 | 3.7 |
| 2012–13 | Meralco | 31 | 16.1 | .446 | .000 | .680 | 3.2 | .8 | .2 | .7 | 3.7 |
| 2013–14 | Talk 'N Text | 41 | 13.4 | .360 | .333 | .759 | 3.7 | .6 | .4 | .8 | 2.6 |
| 2014–15 | GlobalPort | 28 | 12.1 | .455 | .000 | .462 | 2.9 | .3 | .1 | .6 | 2.0 |
| 2014–15 | Alaska | 28 | 12.1 | .455 | .000 | .462 | 2.9 | .3 | .1 | .6 | 2.0 |
| 2015–16 | Alaska | **52** | 14.8 | .473 | .000 | .667 | 2.5 | .5 | .4 | .5 | 3.2 |
| 2016–17 | Alaska | 12 | 15.1 | **.524** | .000 | .667 | 4.0 | **1.1** | .3 | 1.3 | **4.2** |
| 2017–18 | Alaska | 44 | 16.7 | .463 | .000 | .500 | 3.8 | 1.0 | .3 | .8 | 3.7 |
| 2019 | Alaska | 21 | 18.1 | .418 | .111 | .471 | 4.2 | .9 | **.5** | .9 | 3.1 |
| 2021 | Meralco | 21 | 8.4 | .474 | **.429** | .750 | .5 | .2 | .0 | .2 | 2.0 |
| 2022–23 | Meralco | 17 | 7.2 | .250 | .250 | **1.000** | 1.1 | .2 | .4 | .1 | 1.0 |
| Career | | 330 | 14.2 | .441 | .162 | .626 | 3.2 | .7 | .3 | .7 | 2.9 |

== Career highlights and awards ==
- UAAP Season 71 Finals Most Valuable Player
- UAAP Season 71 Smart Defensive Player
