= Lawrence Chongson =

Filipino basketball coach (1963 – 2021)

Personal information
- Born: September 23, 1963
- Died: December 26, 2021 (aged 58)
- Coaching career: 1999–2021

Career history

Coaching
- 1999–2001: Tanduay Rhum Masters (assistant)
- 2002: Osaka–Pangasinan Waves
- 2004–2005: Air Philippines
- 2005–2007: Bacchus Energy Drink Raiders
- 2007–2008: Mail and More Comets
- 2009–2010: UE
- 2009–2017: Tanduay Light Rhum Masters
- 2018–2021: UE (assistant)

Lawrence Chongson (September 23, 1963 – December 26, 2021) was a Filipino basketball coach.

== Career ==
=== Tanduay, MBA, PBL ===
Chongson served as an assistant coach to Alfrancis Chua at Tanduay Rhum Masters in the PBA. After the teams disbandment, he served as head coach of Osaka–Pangasinan Waves in the Metropolitan Basketball Association. In the semi-pro Philippine Basketball League, he coached some teams such as Air Philippines, its successor franchise Bacchus Energy Drink Raiders, and Mail and More Comets (later known as Burger King Stunners).

=== UE Red Warriors ===
He coached the UE Red Warriors for two seasons, and on his first season, he led the Paul Lee-led Warriors to the Finals, after defeating Andy Barroca and the FEU Tamaraws without twice-to-beat advantage. But the team lost to Norman Black-coached Ateneo Blue Eagles in three games. In 2011, he was replaced by former Red Warrior and PBA legend Jerry Codiñera.

He later coached D-League team Tanduay Light Rhum Masters, and returned to UE as their assistant coach, and consultant under Bong Tan in 2019.

== Coaching record ==
=== Collegiate ===
Season	Team	Finish	GP	W	L	PCT	PG	PW	PL	PPCT	Results
2009	UE	3rd	14	10	4	.714	5	3	2	.000	Finals
2010	UE	6th	14	6	8	.429	—	—	—	—	Eliminated
Totals			28	16	12	.571	5	3	2	.600	0 championship

== Sports agent ==
After Paul Lee declared for PBA draft in 2011, Chongson served as Lee's sports agent/representative until his death. He also served as agent for another Red Warrior Roi Sumang.

== Personal ==
=== Family ===
Chongson has two children, named Dale Martin and Bloom.

=== Death ===
Chongson died on December 26, 2021, caused by heart attack.

Preceded by Dindo Pumaren	UE Red Warriors men's basketball head coach 2009-2010	Succeeded by Jerry Codinera
