= 2010–11 Petron Blaze Boosters season =

- Head coach: Ato Agustin
- General Manager: Hector Calma
- Owner(s): San Miguel Corporation

Philippine Cup results
- Record: 11–3 (78.6%)
- Place: 2nd
- Playoff finish: Runner-up (lost to Talk 'N Text, 2–4)

Commissioner's Cup results
- Record: 2–7 (22.2%)
- Place: 10th
- Playoff finish: Did not qualify

Governors' Cup results
- Record: 8–5 (61.5%)
- Place: 5th
- Playoff finish: Champions (defeated Talk 'N Text, 4–3)

Petron Blaze Boosters seasons

The 2010–11 Petron Blaze Boosters season was the 36th season of the franchise in the Philippine Basketball Association (PBA). The team was known as the San Miguel Beermen for the duration of the Philippine and Commissioner's Cups.

== Key dates ==
- August 29, 2010: The 2010 PBA Draft took place in Fort Bonifacio, Taguig.
- March 2011: San Miguel Corporation (SMC) announced that the franchise shall be playing under the name Petron Blaze Boosters, beginning the 2011 PBA Governors Cup. SMC had acquired majority control of Petron Corporation in December 2010.

== Draft picks ==
Round	Pick	Player	Height	Position	Nationality	College
no draft picks

== Roster ==
2010–11 Petron Blaze Boosters roster
Players
Coaches

Pos.	#	POB	Name	Height	Weight	DOB (YYYY–MM–DD)	From
G	1	(Philippines)	Paolo Hubalde	5 ft 10 in (1.78 m)	170 lb (77 kg)		UE
G	2	(Philippines)	Dennis Miranda	5 ft 11 in (1.80 m)	185 lb (84 kg)		Far Eastern
G/F	3	(Philippines)	Lordy Tugade (injured)	6 ft 3 in (1.91 m)	185 lb (84 kg)		National-U
PG	5	(Philippines)	Alex Cabagnot	6 ft 0 in (1.83 m)	165 lb (75 kg)		Hawaiʻi–Hilo
G/F	6	(Philippines)	Rey Guevarra (R)	6 ft 4 in (1.93 m)	175 lb (79 kg)		Letran
F	7	(Philippines)	Nonoy Baclao (R)	6 ft 6 in (1.98 m)	210 lb (95 kg)		Ateneo
F/C	10	(Philippines)	Danny Ildefonso	6 ft 5 in (1.96 m)	210 lb (95 kg)		National-U
C	11	(Philippines)	Rabeh Al-Hussaini (R)	6 ft 7 in (2.01 m)	210 lb (95 kg)		Ateneo
SG	18	(Philippines)	Joseph Yeo (injured)	6 ft 2 in (1.88 m)	170 lb (77 kg)		De La Salle
F	23	(United States)	Jay Washington (injured)	6 ft 8 in (2.03 m)	225 lb (102 kg)		Eckerd
SG	24	(Philippines)	Jojo Duncil	6 ft 1 in (1.85 m)	172 lb (78 kg)		UST
F	29	(Philippines)	Arwind Santos	6 ft 4 in (1.93 m)	170 lb (77 kg)		Far Eastern

Head coach

- (Philippines) Ato Agustin (Lyceum)

Assistant coach(es)

- (Philippines) Gee Abanilla (De La Salle)
- (Philippines) Pido Jarencio (UST)
- (Philippines) Freddie Abuda (Cebu)
- (Philippines) Biboy Ravanes (Cebu)
- (Philippines) Olsen Racela (Ateneo)
- (United States) Bobby Parks (Memphis)

Legend

- (C) Team captain
- (CI) Commissioner's Cup Import
- (GI) Governors' Cup Import
- (EI) EASL Import
- (DP) Unsigned draft pick
- (FA) Free agent
- (IN) Inactive
- (S) Suspended
- (R) Rookie
- Injured

== Philippine Cup ==
=== Eliminations ===
==== Standings ====
Pos	Team	W	L	PCT	GB	Qualification
1	Talk 'N Text Tropang Texters	11	3	.786 (Note: Head-to-head record: San Miguel 1–1 Talk 'N Text (San Miguel +9))	—	Twice-to-beat in the quarterfinals
2	San Miguel Beermen	11	3	.786	—	Twice-to-beat in the quarterfinals
3	Barangay Ginebra Kings	10	4	.714	1	Best-of-three quarterfinals
4	B-Meg Derby Ace Llamados	7	7	.500 (Note: Head-to-head differential: B-Meg +23, Meralco −11, Alaska −12)	4	Best-of-three quarterfinals
5	Meralco Bolts	7	7	.500	4	Best-of-three quarterfinals
6	Alaska Aces	7	7	.500	4	Best-of-three quarterfinals
7	Air21 Express	6	8	.429	5	Twice-to-win in the quarterfinals
8	Rain or Shine Elasto Painters	5	9	.357	6	Twice-to-win in the quarterfinals
9	Powerade Tigers	3	11	.214 (Note: Head-to-head record: Barako Bull 1–0 Powerade)	8	
10	Barako Bull Energy Boosters	3	11	.214	8	

Source: PBA.ph

== Commissioner's Cup ==
=== Eliminations ===
==== Standings ====
Pos	Team	W	L	PCT	GB	Qualification
1	Talk 'N Text Tropang Texters	8	1	.889	—	Advance to semifinals
2	Smart Gilas (G)	7	2	.778	1	Advance to semifinals
3	Barangay Ginebra Kings	5	4	.556 (Note: Head-to-head differential: Barangay Ginebra +12, Air21 −4, Alaska −8)	3	Advance to quarterfinals
4	Air21 Express	5	4	.556	3	Advance to quarterfinals
5	Alaska Aces	5	4	.556	3	Advance to quarterfinals
6	Rain or Shine Elasto Painters	4	5	.444 (Note: Head-to-head record: Rain or Shine 1–0 B-Meg)	4	Advance to quarterfinals
7	B-Meg Derby Ace Llamados	4	5	.444	4	
8	Meralco Bolts	3	6	.333	5	
9	Powerade Tigers	2	7	.222 (Note: Head-to-head record: Powerade 1–0 San Miguel)	6	
10	San Miguel Beermen	2	7	.222	6	

Source: PBA.ph
(G) Guests

== Governors Cup ==
=== Eliminations ===
==== Standings ====
Pos	Team	W	L	PCT	GB	Qualification
1	Talk 'N Text Tropang Texters	6	2	.750	—	Semifinal round
2	Petron Blaze Boosters	5	3	.625 (Note: Head-to-head differential: Petron +10, Alaska +5, Barangay Ginebra −15)	1	Semifinal round
3	Alaska Aces	5	3	.625	1	Semifinal round
4	Barangay Ginebra Kings	5	3	.625	1	Semifinal round
5	Rain or Shine Elasto Painters	4	4	.500 (Note: Head-to-head differential: Rain or Shine +11, B-Meg 0, Powerade −11)	2	Semifinal round
6	B-Meg Derby Ace Llamados	4	4	.500	2	Semifinal round
7	Powerade Tigers	4	4	.500	2	
8	Meralco Bolts	3	5	.375	3	
9	Air21 Express	0	8	.000	6	

Source: PBA.ph

=== Semifinals ===
==== Standings ====
Overall standings
Pos	Team	W	L	PCT	GB	Qualification
1	Talk 'N Text Tropang Texters	9	4	.692	—	Finals
2	Petron Blaze Boosters	8	5	.615 (Note: Head-to-head differential: Petron +13, Alaska +6, Barangay Ginebra −19)	1	Finals
3	Alaska Aces	8	5	.615	1	
4	Barangay Ginebra Kings	8	5	.615	1	
5	Rain or Shine Elasto Painters	6	7	.462	3	
6	B-Meg Derby Ace Llamados	5	8	.385	4	

Source: PBA.ph
Notes:

Semifinal round standings
Pos	Team	W	L
1	Petron Blaze Boosters	3 (Note: Head-to-head differential: Petron +30, Talk 'N Text +15, Barangay Ginebra −16, Alaska −29)	2
2	Talk 'N Text Tropang Texters	3	2
3	Barangay Ginebra Kings	3	2
4	Alaska Aces	3	2
5	Rain or Shine Elasto Painters	2	3
6	B-Meg Derby Ace Llamados	1	4

Source: PBA.ph

== Transactions ==
=== Pre-season ===
==== Trades ====
September 3, 2010	To San Miguel Paul Artadi (from B-Meg Derby Ace)	To Air21 2014 1st round pick (from B-Meg Derby Ace)	To B-Meg Derby Ace Jonas Villanueva (from San Miguel); 2013 2nd round pick(from Air21)

=== Philippine Cup ===
==== Free agents ====
===== Additions =====
Player	Signed	Former team
Vaughn Canta	October 2010	undrafted rookie

==== Trades ====
December 14, 2010	To San Miguel Sunday Salvacion	To Barako Bull Lordy Tugade; Vaughn Canta

=== Commissioner's Cup ===
==== Conditional dispersal draft ====
Player	Signed	Former team
Lordy Tugade	February 9, 2011	Barako Bull*

==== Trades ====
March 2, 2011	To San Miguel Nonoy Baclao; Rabeh Al-Hussaini; Rey Guevarra	To Air21 Danny Seigle; Dondon Hontiveros; Dorian Peña; Paul Artadi

=== Imports recruited ===
Team	Name	Debuted	Last game	Record
Commissioner's Cup	(United States) Ira Brown	February 25 (vs. Air21)	March 4 (vs. Meralco)	1-1
Commissioner's Cup	(United States) David Young	March 9 (vs. Alaska)	April 6 (vs. Rain or Shine)	1–6
Governors Cup	(United States) Mike Taylor	June 12 (vs. Meralco)	June 12 (vs. Meralco)	0–1
Governors Cup	(United States) Jeremy Wise	June 17 (vs. Air21)	July 15 (vs. Powerade)	4-2
Governors Cup	(United States) Anthony Grundy	July 24 (vs. Alaska)	August 21 (vs. Talk 'N Text)	6-5
