= 2008 Philippine Collegiate Championship =

Men's Finals	G1	Wins
Ateneo Blue Eagles	62	0
De La Salle Green Archers	71	1
- Duration: December 8
- Arena(s): Araneta Coliseum
- Finals MVP: JV Casio
- Winning coach: Franz Pumaren
- Semifinalists: Letran Knights; San Beda Red Lions
- TV network(s): C/S 9

The 2008 Philippine Collegiate Championship is the inaugural tournament of the Philippine Collegiate Championship (PCC) for basketball in its current incarnation, and the sixth edition overall. The champion teams from the University Athletic Association of the Philippines (UAAP), National Collegiate Athletic Association (NCAA), the Cebu Schools Athletic Foundation, Inc. (CESAFI) and 3 other Metro Manila leagues took part in the final tournament dubbed as the "Sweet Sixteen". Other teams had to qualify in the zonal tournaments to round out the 16 teams in the tournament.

The De La Salle Green Archers defeated arch-rivals Ateneo Blue Eagles in the championship; budding rivals Letran Knights and the San Beda Red Lions disputed third place, with Letran winning.

The winners would have qualified for the 2009 Summer Universiade in Serbia as the Philippine representative. However, FISU thumbed down an application by the SBP and the Philippine Olympic Committee. As a result, other international tournaments were lined up for the champion team. The 1967 UE Red Warriors led by Robert Jaworski and Danny Florencio was the last team to participate in the Universiade's basketball tournament.

Solar Sports served as the main coverage partner, with the games broadcasting on C/S 9 and Basketball TV.

== Rankings ==
=== Metro Manila ===
Up	Down	Unchanged	New/re-entry

#	Week ending							
#	6/22	6/29	7/6	7/13	7/20	7/27	8/3	8/10
1	UE	San Beda	UE	Ateneo	Ateneo	Ateneo	Ateneo	Ateneo
2	Ateneo	UE	Ateneo	San Beda	San Beda	Letran	San Beda	La Salle
3	San Beda	Ateneo	San Beda	Letran	Letran	La Salle	Letran	San Beda
4	La Salle	La Salle	Letran	UE	La Salle	FEU	FEU	Letran
5	FEU	FEU	La Salle	La Salle	FEU	San Beda	La Salle	JRU
6	JRU	Letran	FEU	Mapúa	UE	JRU	UE	FEU
7	Mapúa	Adamson	UST	UST	Mapúa	UE	JRU	UE
8	Letran	UST	Mapúa	FEU	Adamson	UST	UST	UST
9	UST	JRU	Adamson	Adamson	UST	Mapúa	Mapúa	San Sebastian
10	Adamson	Mapúa	Benilde	Benilde	JRU	Adamson	San Sebastian	Mapúa
11	San Sebastian	Arellano	Arellano	San Sebastian	Arellano	San Sebastian	Arellano	STI
12	NU	STI	JRU	JRU	STI	Arellano	STI	Arellano
13	Arellano	NU	STI	Arellano	San Sebastian	Benilde	Adamson	EAC
14	STI	Lyceum	Lyceum	Lyceum	Lyceum	STI	EAC	St. Clare
15	Lyceum	Perpetual	UP	STI	EAC	EAC	UP	Adamson
UAAP	7	7	7	6	6	6	7	6
NCAA	5	5	5	6	5	6	5	5
Other	3	3	3	3	4	3	3	4

Up	Down	Unchanged	New/re-entry

#	Week ending						
#	8/17	8/24	8/31	9/7	9/14	9/21	10/19 (Final)
1	Ateneo	Ateneo	Ateneo	Ateneo	Ateneo	Ateneo	Ateneo
2	La Salle	San Beda	San Beda	San Beda	La Salle	La Salle	San Beda
3	JRU	FEU	FEU	La Salle	San Beda	JRU	La Salle
4	Letran	JRU	La Salle	FEU	FEU	San Beda	JRU
5	FEU	La Salle	San Sebastian	UE	Letran	FEU	FEU
6	San Beda	UE	JRU	Letran	JRU	Mapúa	Mapúa
7	UE	San Sebastian	UE	San Sebastian	Mapúa	UE	UE
8	Mapúa	Letran	Letran	Mapúa	San Sebastian	Letran	Letran
9	San Sebastian	UST	Mapúa	JRU	UE	San Sebastian	San Sebastian
10	UST	AMACU	UST	SSC-R Cavite	SSC-R Cavite	UST	Arellano
11	St. Clare	Mapúa	St. Clare	PSBA	STI	EAC	SSC-R Cavite
12	AMACU	New Era	AMACU	STI	St. Clare	UCN	UST
13	SSC-R Cavite	St. Clare	PSBA	AMACU	UST	STI	Lyceum
14	Arellano	PSBA	SSC-R Cavite	Manila	LPC	SSC-R Cavite	St. Clare
15	EAC	Arellano	LPC	LPC	AMACU	LPC	EAC
UAAP	5	5	5	4	5	5	5
NCAA	5	5	5	5	5	5	5
Other	5	5	5	6	5	5	5

=== Cebu ===
Up	Down	Unchanged	New/re-entry

#	Week ending								
#	6/29	8/10	8/17	8/24	8/31	9/7	9/14	9/21	9/28
1	USJ-R	USJ–R	USJ–R	USJ–R	USJ–R	UV			
2	SWU	SWU	UV	UV	UV	USJ–R			
3	USC	USC	SWU	SWU	SWU	USC			
4	UV	UV	USC	USC	USC	SWU			
5		Cebu	Cebu	Cebu	Cebu	Cebu			
6		ACT	Don Bosco	Don Bosco	Don Bosco	Don Bosco			
7		Don Bosco	ACT	USPF	USPF	USPF			
8		USPF	USPF	ACT	ACT	ACT			
9		Cebu Tech	Cebu Tech	Cebu Tech	Cebu Tech	Cebu Tech			
10		Salazar	Salazar	Salazar	Salazar	Salazar			

=== Region 1 (Dagupan, Pangasinan, Baguio) ===
Up	Down	Unchanged	New/re-entry

#	Week ending			
#	9/7	9/14	9/21	9/28
1	UNP			
2	St. Louis University, Baguio			
3	University of the Cordilleras			

=== Region 2 (Pampanga, Tarlac, Bulacan) ===
Up	Down	Unchanged	New/re-entry

#	Week ending			
#	9/7	9/14	9/21	9/28
1	Lyceum-Subic			
2	Luzon			
3	Lyceum Northwestern			

=== Region 3 (Quezon, Bicol) ===
Up	Down	Unchanged	New/re-entry

#	Week ending			
#	9/7	9/14	9/21	9/28
1	Nueva Caceres			
2	Enverga			
3	CCDI			

=== Region 4 (Iloilo, Bacolod) ===
Up	Down	Unchanged	New/re-entry

#	Week ending			
#	9/7	9/14	9/21	9/28
1	Western Tech			
2	Lacson Maritime			
3	West Negros			

=== Region 5 (Dumaguete, Bohol) ===
Up	Down	Unchanged	New/re-entry

#	Week ending			
#	9/7	9/14	9/21	9/28
1	BIT International			
2	Holy Name			
3	Silliman			

=== Region 6 (Tacloban, Ormoc, Samar) ===
Up	Down	Unchanged	New/re-entry

#	Week ending			
#	9/7	9/14	9/21	9/28
1	Western Leyte			
2	AMA			
3	Leyte			

=== Region 7 (Cagayan de Oro, Misamis Oriental, Caraga) ===
Up	Down	Unchanged	New/re-entry

#	Week ending			
#	9/7	9/14	9/21	9/28
1	Xavier			
2	Capitol			

=== Region 8 (Davao, Soccsksargen, Maguindanao) ===
Up	Down	Unchanged	New/re-entry

#	Week ending			
#	9/7	9/14	9/21	9/28
1	Agro-Industrial			
2	Emar			
3	Mindanao			

=== Region 9 (Zamboanga, Misamis Occidental) ===
Up	Down	Unchanged	New/re-entry

#	Week ending			
#	9/7	9/14	9/21	9/28
1	Immaculate Conception			Ateneo de Zamboanga
2	Kabasalan Tech			Dipolog Medical
3	Ateneo de Zamboanga			Saint Vincent's

== Qualifying ==
Finish	League						
Finish	UAAP	NCAA	CESAFI	CUSA	NAASCU	UCAA	Provincial leagues
1st	Round of 16						Regional championships
2nd	Round of 16		Zonal championships	Wildcard qualification	Wildcard qualification	Wildcard qualification	
3rd	Zonal championships		Zonal championships	Wildcard qualification	Wildcard qualification	Wildcard qualification	
4th	Zonal championships		Zonal championships	Wildcard qualification		Wildcard qualification	
5th	Wildcard qualification						

- Regional championships has four teams in each of the nine regions: one team per region qualifies for the zonal championships.
- Wildcard qualifying has eight teams split into two groups: top two teams per group qualifies for the zonal championships.
- Zonal championships has four zones divided into two groups composed of two groups: the top team from each group qualifies for the round of 16.

=== Automatic qualifiers ===
- Ateneo Blue Eagles - UAAP champion
- De La Salle Green Archers - UAAP runner-up
- San Beda Red Lions - NCAA champion
- JRU Heavy Bombers - NCAA runner-up
- SSC-R Cavite Baycats - NAASCU champion
- MLQU Stallions - CUSA champion
- UCN Golden Dragons - UCAA champion
- UV Green Lancers - CESAFI champion

=== Regional championships ===
Winners qualify for the zonal championships:

1. Region 1: SLU Navigators
2. Region 2: U of Luzon Tigers
3. Region 3: UNC Greyhounds
4. Region 4: WNU Mustangs
5. Region 5: U of Luzon Tigers
6. Region 6: AMA Computer Learning Center - ACLC College Ormoc
7. Region 7: Capitol Stallions
8. Region 8: U of Mindanao Wildcats
9. Region 9: Ateneo de Zamboanga Blue Eagles

=== Wildcard qualifying ===
Qualified for zonal championships

Top two teams from each group qualify for the zonal championships:

==== Group A ====
Team	W	L	PCT	UST	SCC	LPC	SFACS
UST Growling Tigers	3	0	1.000	––	80–71	69–66	64–51
St. Clare Saints	2	1	.667	––	––	74–66	70–66
LPC Blue Lions	1	2	.333	––	––	––	62–53
SFACS Doves	0	3	.000	––	––	––	––

==== Group B ====
Team	W	L	PCT	LPU	EAC	STI	DOMC
Lyceum Pirates	3	0	1.000	––	86–80	88–86	79–75
EAC Generals	2	1	.667	––	––	90–88	80–70
STI Olympians	1	2	.333	––	––	––	76–65
DOMC Cobras	0	3	.000	––	––	––	––

=== Zonal championships ===
Qualified for the final tournament

Winners from the regional championships and wildcard qualifying are drawn into four different teams: each zone has to have only one wildcard team.

==== Zone 1 ====
Games were held at the Makati Coliseum from November 3–6:

Group A
Team	W	L	PCT	MIT	UL	Lyc
Mapúa Cardinals	2	0	1.000	––	77–59	104–58
U of Luzon Golden Tigers	1	1	.500	––	––	79–62
Lyceum Batangas	0	2	.000	––	––	––

Group B
Team	W	L	PCT	AU	UST	SLU
Arellano Chiefs	2	0	1.000	––	69–59	82–36
UST Growling Tigers	1	1	.500	––	––	102–52
St. Louis Navigators	0	2	.000	––	––	––

==== Zone 2 ====
Games were held at the Makati Coliseum from November 3–6:

Group A
Team	W	L	PCT	LPU	DBTC	UNC
Lyceum Pirates	2	0	1.000	––	87–79	81–60
Don Bosco Grey Wolves	1	1	.500	––	––	73–64
UNC Greyhounds	0	2	.000	––	––	––

Group B
Team	W	L	PCT	UE	EAC	SCC
UE Red Warriors	2	0	1.000	––	92–74	108–80
EAC Generals	1	1	.500	––	––	65–62
St. Clare Saints	0	2	.000	––	––	––

==== Zone 3 ====
Games were held at the Ormoc City Superdome from November 9–11:

Group A
Team	W	L	PCT	CSJL	UC	AMA
Letran Knights	2	0	1.000	––	––	96–55
UC Webmasters	1	1	.500			
AMA Ormoc Titans	0	2	.000			

Group B
Team	W	L	PCT	USJ-R	WNU	BIT
USJ-R Jaguars	2	0	1.000	––	88-77	
WNU Mustangs	1	1	.500			
BIT Cruisers	0	2	.000			

==== Zone 4 ====
Games were held at the Xavier University Gym from November 14–17:

Group A
Team	W	L	PCT	FEU	XU	ADZU
FEU Tamaraws	2	0	1.000	––	77–71	105–55
Xavier Crusaders	1	1	.500	––	––	80–61
Ateneo de Zamboanga Blue Eagles	0	2	.000	––	––	––

Group B
Team	W	L	PCT	PD	USC	UMin	Cap
USC Warriors	1	1	.500	+27	––	81–51	84–87
U of Mindanao Wildcats	1	1	.500	-6	––	––	83–74
Capitol Stallions	1	1	.500	-21	––	––	––

== Qualifying teams ==
Seed	School	League	Result	Berth type
1	Ateneo Blue Eagles	UAAP	UAAP champion	Automatic
2	San Beda Red Lions	NCAA	NCAA champion	Automatic
3	De La Salle Green Archers	UAAP	UAAP runner-up	Automatic
4	JRU Heavy Bombers	NCAA	NCAA runner-up	Automatic
5	SSC-R Cavite Baycats	NAASCU	NAASCU champion	Automatic
6	UV Green Lancers	CESAFI	CESAFI champion	Automatic
7	UCN Dragons	UCAA	UCAA champion	Automatic
8	MLQU Stallions	CUSA	CUSA champion	Automatic
9	Mapúa Cardinals	NCAA	NCAA fourth place	Zonal
10	Arellano Chiefs	NCRAA	NCRAA runner-up	Zonal
11	UE Red Warriors	UAAP	UAAP fourth place	Zonal
12	Letran Knights	NCAA	NCAA third place	Zonal
13	FEU Tamaraws	UAAP	UAAP third place	Zonal
14	USC Warriors	CESAFI	CESAFI third place	Zonal
15	USJ-R Jaguars	CESAFI	CESAFI runner-up	Zonal
16	Lyceum Pirates	NCRAA	NCRAA runner-up	Zonal

== Bracket ==
Round of 16
November 24 - San Juan Arena
Ateneo	77
Lyceum	56
November 26 - San Juan Arena
MLQU	85
Mapúa	97
November 29 - San Juan Arena
SSC-R Cavite	70
Letran	85
November 29 - San Juan Arena
JRU	75
FEU	84
November 24 - San Juan Arena
San Beda	98
USJ-R	83
November 27 - San Juan Arena
UCN	61
Arellano	76
November 27 - San Juan Arena
UV	62
UE	68
November 26 - San Juan Arena
La Salle	71
USC	51

Quarter-finals
November 30 - Ynares Arena
Ateneo	67
Mapúa	53
December 3 - San Juan Arena
Letran	94
FEU	93
December 3 - San Juan Arena
San Beda	87
Arellano	72
November 30 - Ynares Arena
UE	72
La Salle	75

Semi-finals
December 6 - San Juan Arena
Ateneo	61
Letran	60
December 6 - San Juan Arena
San Beda	61
La Salle	62

National Championship
December 8 - Araneta Coliseum
Ateneo	62
La Salle	71
Third place
December 8 - Araneta Coliseum
Letran	75
San Beda	67

== Round of 16 ==
C/S 9

November 24

Ateneo Blue Eagles	77–56	Lyceum Pirates

The Arena in San Juan, San Juan

BTV

November 24

San Beda Red Lions	98–83	USJ-R Jaguars

The Arena in San Juan, San Juan

BTV

November 26

Mapúa Cardinals	97–85	MLQU Stallions

The Arena in San Juan, San Juan

BTV

November 26

De La Salle Green Archers	71–51	USC Warriors

The Arena in San Juan, San Juan

C/S 9

November 27

Arellano Chiefs	76–61	UCN Golden Dragons

The Arena in San Juan, San Juan

C/S 9

November 27

UE Red Warriors	68–62	UV Green Lancers

The Arena in San Juan, San Juan

BTV

November 29

Letran Knights	85–70	SSC-R Cavite Baycats

The Arena in San Juan, San Juan

C/S 9

November 29

JRU Heavy Bombers	75–84	FEU Tamaraws

The Arena in San Juan, San Juan

== Quarterfinals ==
C/S 9

November 29

Ateneo Blue Eagles	67–53	Mapúa Cardinals

Ynares Sports Arena, Pasig

C/S 9/BTV

November 29

De La Salle Green Archers	75–72	UE Red Warriors

Ynares Sports Arena, Pasig

BTV

December 3

Letran Knights	94–93	FEU Tamaraws

The Arena in San Juan, San Juan

BTV

December 3

San Beda Red Lions	87–72	Arellano Chiefs

The Arena in San Juan, San Juan

== Semifinals ==
C/S 9

December 6

Ateneo Blue Eagles	61–60	Letran Knights

The Arena in San Juan, San Juan

BTV

December 6

De La Salle Green Archers	62–61	San Beda Red Lions

The Arena in San Juan, San Juan

== Third-place playoff ==
C/S 9/BTV

December 8

Letran Knights	75–67	San Beda Red Lions

Araneta Coliseum, Quezon City

== Final ==
C/S 9

December 8

Ateneo Blue Eagles	62–71	De La Salle Green Archers

Araneta Coliseum, Quezon City

== Awards ==
- Most Valuable Player: JV Casio (La Salle)
- Mythical 5:
  - JV Casio (La Salle)
  - Rico Maierhofer (La Salle)
  - R.J. Jazul (Letran)
  - Nonoy Baclao (Ateneo)
  - Rabeh Al-Hussaini (Ateneo)
- Best Coach: Franz Pumaren (La Salle)

== Record per league ==
League	# of teams	Record	PCT	QF	SF	CG
CESAFI	3	0–3	.000	–	–	–
NAASCU	2	0–2	.000	–	–	–
NCAA	4	6–5	.583	3	2	–
NCRAA	1	1–1	.500	1	–	–
UAAP	4	9–3	.750	4	2	2

The CUSA and the UCAA went 0–1. Other provincial leagues aside from the CESAFI failed to qualify.

Preceded by 2007 CCL	Philippine Collegiate Championship; 2008	Succeeded by 2009
