= UAAP Season 71 men's basketball tournament =

Basketball competition in the Philippines

UAAP Season 71
- Host school: University of the Philippines, Diliman
Men's Finals	G1	G2	Wins
Ateneo Blue Eagles	69	62	2
De La Salle Green Archers	61	51	0
- Duration: September 21–25, 2008
- Arena(s): Araneta Coliseum
- Finals MVP: Nonoy Baclao
- Winning coach: Norman Black
- Semifinalists: FEU Tamaraws; UE Red Warriors
- TV network(s): Studio 23

The UAAP Season 71 men's basketball tournament is the 2008–09 season of the University Athletic Association of the Philippines (UAAP) Basketball Championship, with University of the Philippines, Diliman as the season host, to coincide with the centennial celebrations of the University of the Philippines System.

The Ateneo Blue Eagles swept their archrivals De La Salle Green Archers in two games to clinch their first UAAP title since 2002, and to give head coach Norman Black his first collegiate championship. Ateneo's Rabeh Al-Hussaini was named Most Valuable Player (MVP) of the season, while Nonoy Baclao was named as the Finals MVP. Ryan Buenafe won the Rookie of the Year honors, also for the Ateneo.

== Teams ==
Team	School	Coach
Adamson Soaring Falcons	Adamson University	Leo Austria
Ateneo Blue Eagles	Ateneo de Manila University	Norman Black
De La Salle Green Archers	De La Salle University	Franz Pumaren
FEU Tamaraws	Far Eastern University	Glenn Capacio
NU Bulldogs	National University	Manny Dandan
UE Red Warriors	University of the East	Dindo Pumaren
UP Fighting Maroons	University of the Philippines Diliman	Aboy Castro
UST Growling Tigers	University of Santo Tomas	Pido Jarencio

== Preseason ==
Aboy Castro succeeds Joe Lipa as the new head coach of the UP Fighting Maroons, after Lipa led his team to a 0–14 record in Season 70. Castro was an assistant coach of Glenn Capacio for the FEU Tamaraws, and of Chot Reyes for the Philippines men's national basketball team, the San Miguel Beermen and Talk 'N Text Phone Pals.

== Elimination round ==
Newly crowned World Boxing Council lightweight and super featherweight champion Manny Pacquiao and Washington Wizards player Gilbert Arenas attended the July 6 games featuring host UP against NU and the Ateneo-La Salle game. Pacquiao was given Sports Excellence award by the UAAP Board while Arenas was on town on a promotional tour.

On July 24, 2008 FEU player Marnel "Mac" Baracael was shot and critically wounded near the FEU campus. The assailant used a caliber .45 pistol with a silencer. Baracael is now in stable condition; police speculate that the shooting maybe basketball-related. Baracael suited up for the Tamaraws in their game against NU, August 28, 2008.

=== Team standings ===
Pos	Team	W	L	PCT	GB	Qualification
1	Ateneo Blue Eagles	13	1	.929	—	Twice-to-beat in the semifinals
2	De La Salle Green Archers	10	4	.714 (Note: Second-seed playoff: La Salle 62–59 FEU)	3	Twice-to-beat in the semifinals
3	FEU Tamaraws	10	4	.714	3	Twice-to-win in the semifinals
4	UE Red Warriors	9	5	.643	4	Twice-to-win in the semifinals
5	UST Growling Tigers	6	8	.429	7	
6	UP Fighting Maroons (H)	3	11	.214 (Note: Head-to-head record: UP 2–0 Adamson)	10	
7	Adamson Soaring Falcons	3	11	.214	10	
8	NU Bulldogs	2	12	.143	11	

Source: ABS-CBN Sports
Rules for classification: 1) winning percentage; 2) if tied for #2 or #4, one-game playoff; 3) head-to-head record; 4) head-to-head point differential; 5) overall point differential
(H) Hosts

=== Schedule ===
	Round 1							Round 2						
Team ╲ Game	1	2	3	4	5	6	7	8	9	10	11	12	13	14
Adamson	FEU school colors	Ateneo school colors	NU school colors	UE school colors	La Salle school colors	UST school colors	UP school colors	UST school colors	FEU school colors	Ateneo school colors	UP school colors	UE school colors	La Salle school colors	NU school colors
Ateneo	La Salle school colors	Adamson school colors	UE school colors	UP school colors	NU school colors	FEU school colors	UST school colors	FEU school colors	UST school colors	Adamson school colors	UE school colors	UP school colors	NU school colors	La Salle school colors
La Salle	Ateneo school colors	FEU school colors	UST school colors	NU school colors	Adamson school colors	UP school colors	UE school colors	UE school colors	UP school colors	NU school colors	FEU school colors	UST school colors	Adamson school colors	Ateneo school colors
FEU	Adamson school colors	La Salle school colors	UP school colors	UST school colors	UE school colors	Ateneo school colors	NU school colors	Ateneo school colors	Adamson school colors	UST school colors	La Salle school colors	NU school colors	UP school colors	UE school colors
NU	UP school colors	UE school colors	Adamson school colors	La Salle school colors	Ateneo school colors	UST school colors	FEU school colors	UP school colors	UE school colors	La Salle school colors	UST school colors	FEU school colors	Ateneo school colors	Adamson school colors
UE	UST school colors	NU school colors	Ateneo school colors	Adamson school colors	UP school colors	FEU school colors	La Salle school colors	La Salle school colors	NU school colors	UP school colors	Ateneo school colors	Adamson school colors	UST school colors	FEU school colors
UP	NU school colors	UST school colors	FEU school colors	Ateneo school colors	UE school colors	La Salle school colors	Adamson school colors	NU school colors	La Salle school colors	UE school colors	Adamson school colors	Ateneo school colors	FEU school colors	UST school colors
UST	UE school colors	UP school colors	La Salle school colors	FEU school colors	Adamson school colors	NU school colors	Ateneo school colors	Adamson school colors	Ateneo school colors	FEU school colors	NU school colors	La Salle school colors	UE school colors	UP school colors

= Win; = OT win; = Loss; = OT loss

=== Results ===
Team	AdU	ADMU	DLSU	FEU	NU	UE	UP	UST
Adamson Soaring Falcons		45–72	61–76	71–74	73–65	66–64	68–76	80–88*
Ateneo Blue Eagles	78–59		79–73	66–72	74–62	64–58	83–66	64–57
De La Salle Green Archers	84–79*	57–65		73–62	93–69	62–68	82–60	85–84
FEU Tamaraws	70–62	74–78	83–75		61–69	71–69	88–66	70–65
NU Bulldogs	57–68	58–83	67–79	60–64		69–82	58–87	77–88
UE Red Warriors	58–45	57–61*	61–70	73–61	67–50		87–58	78–73
UP Fighting Maroons	73–42	58–79	61–81	70–71	59–72	65–95		75–94
UST Growling Tigers	97–83	76–85	79–81	69–74*	68–58	87–89	71–63	

Legend: Blue = left column team win; Red = top row team win.
Matches with lighter background shading were decided after overtime.

== Postseason teams ==
=== Ateneo Blue Eagles ===
Ateneo opened the season against La Salle, eking out a six-point win 79-73. After an easy win against Adamson, the Eagles were taken to the edge by UE before winning. They won two more games until the sixth game against FEU. The Tamaraws seized the initiative in the endgame to deal Ateneo their first and only loss of the season even with Rabeh Al-Hussaini scoring half of Ateneo's 66 points. Ateneo won the next 8 games, including a close game versus UST, and an overtime win against UE in which Ryan Buenafe did the heroics over two UE centers, and a rout against NU, the last of which clinched them the twice to beat advantage in the semifinals. In the elimination round finale against the Green Archers they never let La Salle lead, en route to a 65-57 win against their arch-rivals and a sweep of the 2nd round. The 13-1 league leading Blue Eagles faced the 9-5 UE Red Warriors in the semifinals, and ended the fourth seed team's season, with a 70-50 win.

=== De La Salle Green Archers ===
After losing their first game against the Eagles, La Salle won five consecutive games. UE gave La Salle their second loss but La Salle won their next game also against the Red Warriors. La Salle won their next three games but lost to FEU. With head coach Franz Pumaren out of the country coaching the under-18 team in the FIBA Asia Under-18 Championship 2008, La Salle prevented overtime with a buzzer-beating put-back for the win against UST, and an overtime win against Adamson to ensure a semifinals berth. Pumaren returned to the country with still a game left at the U-18 tournament to coach the game against league-leading Ateneo Blue Eagles, which would be crucial for them to clinch the twice to beat advantage, even with FEU losing their final elimination game against UE, they lost the game against the Eagles. La Salle's leading scorer in Jvee Casio was being guarded well by the Eagles ended up having a nightmare game, sinking only two field goals out of 17 from the field. The Archers then won two straight games against FEU in the semifinals, thus eliminating the Tamaraws and going to the Finals.

=== FEU Tamaraws ===
FEU survived their game against Adamson with a three-pointer to save the game for them. La Salle defeated them but they won their next two games against UP and UST. However, starting power forward Marnel "Mac" Baracael was shot outside school premises that caused him to be sidelined. In their next game against UE, FEU had a rally in the fourth quarter to give them an emphatic win. Riding their three-game winning streak, the Tamaraws defeated the Eagles as they held off the Eagles in the waning minutes of the fourth quarter.

Just after they've won against the #1 team, the #8 team NU upset the Tamaraws who were then tied with three teams for #1. A sorry loss against Ateneo gave them their first losing streak, but an easy win against Adamson and a come from behind overtime win against UST put them back on track. With wins against La Salle, NU and UP, FEU clinched a semifinals berth. They will fight for a playoff game for the twice to beat advantage vs. La Salle since La Salle was beaten by Ateneo in the elimination round finale.

=== UE Red Warriors ===
Coming off a 14-0 elimination round sweep last year, UE continued their dominance of the elimination round with wins against UST and NU. However, fellow undefeated team Ateneo handed them their first defeat of the season. A shock loss against Adamson gave them their first elimination round losing streak in a year. Although they've won against cellar dweller UP, the loss against FEU placed them at .500. In a rematch of 2007 Finals, UE got some sort of vengeance as the defeated La Salle, but the Archers got payback as they met each other again four days later.

With wins against doormats UP and NU, UE gave Ateneo another dogfight but they came up short in overtime. Avenging their first round loss against Adamson, UE eliminated UST despite giving up their 24-point lead in the fourth quarter to clinch their semifinals berth.

== Second seed playoff ==
La Salle and FEU ended tied for second; as a result, a playoff was held to determine which team will clinch the #2 seed and the twice-to-beat advantage that goes along with it, leading to a de facto first game of a best-of-three series.

Studio 23

September 11
3:30 p.m.

De La Salle Green Archers	62–59	FEU Tamaraws
Scoring by quarter: 8–10, 15–15, 24–14, 15–20
Pts: JV Casio 16; Rebs: Rico Maierhofer 10; Asts: JV Casio 4		Pts: Reil Cervantes 14; Rebs: Reil Cervantes 11; Asts: Aldrech Ramos 4
La Salle wins the twice to beat advantage

Araneta Coliseum, Quezon City

== Bracket ==
Semifinals (Top 2 twice-to-beat)
1	Ateneo	70
4	UE	50
2	La Salle	67
3	FEU	62

Finals (Best-of-three playoff)
1	Ateneo	69	62
2	La Salle	61	51

== Semifinals ==
La Salle and Ateneo have the twice-to-beat advantage. They only have to win once, while their opponents, twice, to progress.

=== Ateneo vs. UE ===
Studio 23

September 14
4:00 p.m.

Ateneo Blue Eagles	70–50	UE Red Warriors
Scoring by quarter: 17–11, 15–10, 17–7, 21–22
Pts: Jai Reyes 13; Rebs: Nonoy Baclao 9 Asts: Buenafe, Salamat 4 each		Pts: James Martinez 13; Rebs: Elmer Espiritu 9 Asts: 3 players, 2 each
Ateneo wins series in one game

Araneta Coliseum, Quezon City

With UE staying put in the first quarter, Ateneo marked a 16-0 rally late in the first that turned a 5-11 deficit to a 25-13 advantage late in the second quarter. Eric Salamat anchored the run, scoring nine points in that stretch. Freshman Ryan Buenafe's hard drive to the basket erected the Eagles' largest lead at 56-28. The Warriors managed to cut down the lead to twenty but the final deficit was good enough for the third-largest winning margin in Final Four history.

=== La Salle vs. FEU ===
Studio 23

September 14
2:00 p.m.

De La Salle Green Archers	67–62	FEU Tamaraws
Scoring by quarter: 16–20, 18–18, 14–14, 19–10
Pts: James Mangahas 20; Rebs: Rico Maierhofer 10; Asts: JV Casio 6		Pts: JR Cawaling 18; Rebs: Aldrech Ramos 8 Asts: Jens Knuttel 4
La Salle wins series in one game

Araneta Coliseum, Quezon City

Although the Tamaraws led for much of the game, La Salle came from behind to lead 64-62 with 35.2 remaining in the fourth quarter. Marnel "Mac" Baracael missed two free-throws that would've tied the game. After James Mangahas split his charities after a foul in the ensuing rebound play, Paul Sanga missed a desperation three-pointer. The rebound went to La Salle which capitalized with a fastbreak led by Mangahas to settle the final score and their second-consecutive Finals appearance.

== Finals ==
Prior to the finals, the National Bureau of Investigation (NBI) nabbed six ticket scalpers in the Araneta Coliseum for selling outrageously priced tickets. Both head coaches agreed that the officiating in the finals be fair and consistent. UAAP Commissioner Chito Narvasa has already listed 12 referees directly under his management for the series. La Salle head coach Franz Pumaren further remarked that the host school can prevent scalping if it helps in the accounting of tickets; the tickets for the first game were already sold out a week prior to the game.

Meanwhile, security was tight at the Araneta Coliseum to prevent petty thieves from infiltrating the event. However, the security wasn't able to prevent thievery as members of the "Salisi (theft) Gang" were able to steal several items inside the coliseum at the first game.

=== Game 1 ===
Studio 23

September 21
4:00 p.m.

Ateneo Blue Eagles	69–61	De La Salle Green Archers
Scoring by quarter: 15–12, 21–17, 19–16, 14–16
Pts: Rabeh Al-Hussaini 31; Rebs: Ryan Buenafe 11; Blocks: Nonoy Baclao 7		Pts: JV Casio 20; Rebs: Rico Maierhofer 16; Asts: JV Casio 3
Ateneo leads series, 1–0

Araneta Coliseum, Quezon City
Attendance: 22,900

Ateneo opened the scoring with a strong first quarter, but La Salle caught up with them to cut the lead to three. La Salle then went on to lead, 29-26 off Casio's three-point play, but the Eagles launched a 10-0 run to lead at the half despite Chris Tiu, Eric Salamat and Nonoy Baclao spending time on the bench thanks to foul trouble. Rabeh Al-Hussaini had a monster second half, holding back a La Salle rally that cut the lead to six care of JV Casio and Bader Malabes as he scored Ateneo's next eight points to put the game away from the Archers for a game 1 victory.

Game 1 tickets with a face value of P350 were being sold online for P50,300, and some bought tickets from scalpers for P25,000 for the same face value.

=== Game 2 ===
Studio 23

September 25
4:00 p.m.

Ateneo Blue Eagles	62–51	De La Salle Green Archers
Scoring by quarter: 16–10, 25–16, 9–21, 12–4
Pts: Chris Tiu 16; Rebs: Nonoy Baclao 10; Blocks: Nonoy Baclao 5		Pts: JV Casio 18; Rebs: PJ Walsham 11; TO's: JV Casio 5
Ateneo wins series, 2–0

Araneta Coliseum, Quezon City
Attendance: 22,955

- Finals Most Valuable Player: Nonoy Baclao (Ateneo Blue Eagles)

La Salle started the game with an 8–3 scoreline, capped by a Simon Atkins three-pointer. Ateneo came back with their own 24–9 run to hold the lead 27–17 despite Al-Hussaini riding the bench with two personal fouls. Ateneo closed out the first half with another 8-0 run to lead 41-26. JV Casio cut the lead to three points in a 21-9 run that included six three-pointers by the third quarter. However, Rico Maierhofer was ejected from the game for incurring a second technical for flashing the dirty finger, but he claimed he was instructing a teammate to defend using the index finger. La Salle wasn't able to hold on, and Al-Hussaini scored all of his seven points in the third quarter to lead the Ateneo counter-attack. Things got exacerbated when Casio fouled out with 2:48 remaining. Ateneo had a 10-4 run in the final minutes, capped by a three-point play by Jai Reyes to clinch their fourth UAAP title.

La Salle coach Franz Pumaren lambasted the officials saying "It's like a script, you know the ending. They should have just given the trophy right away." He further said that the officiating was "the worst" he has ever seen "in the Finals". Maierhofer was in tears as he walked towards the dugout; La Salle was called for 29 fouls, awarding Ateneo 28 free-throws of which they converted 18.

Ateneo's Nonoy Baclao was named Most Valuable Player of the finals after being the anchor of the Ateneo defense. Baclao scored eight points, grabbed 10 rebounds and blocked five shots in game 2 after scoring seven points, grabbing 7 rebounds and blocking 7 shots, including a crucial block to Maierhofer, in game 1.

== Awards ==
UAAP Season 71 men's basketball champions
Ateneo Blue Eagles
Fourth title
(18th title including NCAA championships)

The season's awardees were awarded on a ceremony prior to Game 2 of the finals at the Araneta Coliseum. They are:

- Most Valuable Player: Rabeh Al-Hussaini (Ateneo Blue Eagles)
- Rookie of the Year: Ryan Buenafe (Ateneo Blue Eagles)
- Mythical Five:
  - Rabeh Al-Hussaini (Ateneo Blue Eagles)
  - Jervy Cruz (UST Growling Tigers)
  - Chris Tiu (Ateneo Blue Eagles)
  - JV Casio (De La Salle Green Archers)
  - Rico Maierhofer (De La Salle Green Archers)
- PSBank Maasahan Award: Chris Tiu (Ateneo Blue Eagles)
- KFC Court Colonel: Eric Salamat (Ateneo Blue Eagles)
- Smart Defensive Player Award: Nonoy Baclao (Ateneo Blue Eagles)
- Jollibee Champ award (top scorer): Rabeh Al-Hussaini (Ateneo Blue Eagles)
- Appeton Most Improved Player: Rabeh Al-Hussaini (Ateneo Blue Eagles)
- Tokyo Tokyo All-Rookie Team:
  - Clark Bautista (UST Growling Tigers)
  - LA Revilla (De La Salle Green Archers)
  - Ryan Buenafe (Ateneo Blue Eagles)
  - Joshua Webb (De La Salle Green Archers)
  - Nico Salva (Ateneo Blue Eagles)
- Head and Shoulders Crucial Stop: De La Salle Green Archers (last 2 minutes in their Final Four game vs. FEU)

== Controversies ==
=== ID controversy ===
After the Ateneo's first round defeat of La Salle, La Salle coach Franz Pumaren contested the technical given to him for not wearing his ID; previously, UST coach Pido Jarencio wasn't issued a technical when he wasn't wearing his ID. Pumaren labeled this as "selective officiating." La Salle elevated the issue to the UAAP Board but refused to label it as a "protest". Jarencio for his part said that he is willing to accept any sanctions for not wearing his ID, including two technical free throws in their next game.

As a result of the controversy, Commissioner Narvasa suspended the three referees officiating in the Ateneo-La Salle game for one game for "losing control of the ballgame." La Salle's league representative welcomed the sanctions "but the sanction is for poor officiating; it has nothing to do with the technical foul called."

=== Suspension of referee ===
Another referee was suspended indefinitely by the National Amateur Basketball Referees Organization (NABRO, the organization handling the league referees) after the July 12 La Salle-FEU game. Bryan Tabañag made several errant calls that "deprived FEU a fair chance to determine who the better team was," according to NABRO president Rolando Omampo. Tabañag is NABRO's vice-president.

Despite the referee's suspension, the La Salle-FEU game won't be replayed.

== See also ==
- 2008 Philippine Collegiate Championship

Preceded by Season 70 (2007)	UAAP men's basketball seasons Season 71 (2008) basketball	Succeeded by Season 72 (2009)
