= 2009 Philippine Collegiate Championship =

Men's Finals	G1	G2	G3	Wins
Ateneo Blue Eagles	70	90	74	2
FEU Tamaraws	75	63	70	1
- Duration: December 9–13
- Arena(s): Ynares Sports Arena
- Finals MVP: Jai Reyes
- Winning coach: Norman Black
- Semifinalists: San Beda Red Lions; San Sebastian Stags
- TV network(s): Studio 23

The 2009 Philippine Collegiate Championship was the second tournament of the Philippine Collegiate Championship (PCC) for basketball in its current incarnation, and the seventh edition overall. The champion teams from the University Athletic Association of the Philippines (UAAP), National Collegiate Athletic Association (NCAA), the Cebu Schools Athletic Foundation, Inc. (CESAFI) and 3 other Metro Manila leagues took part in the final tournament dubbed as the "Sweet Sixteen". Other teams had to qualify in the zonal tournaments to round out the 16 teams in the tournament.

The Ateneo Blue Eagles defeated the FEU Tamaraws in the championship; the San Beda Red Lions and the San Sebastian Stags disputed third place, with San Beda winning.

ABS-CBN Sports was the coverage partner, with games airing on Studio 23.

== Tournament format ==
- Top 4 teams from the NCAA and the UAAP and the CESAFI qualify automatically to the national quarterfinals.
- Fifth to sixth teams from the NCAA and UAAP qualify to the zonal qualifying games.
- Champions from regional league qualify to the regional championship.
- Best teams from the regional championship qualify for the zonal qualifying games.
- Best seven teams from the zonal qualifying games qualify to the national quarterfinals
- Teams are seeded 1 to 16th at the national quarterfinals in a single elimination format up to the Finals, which is a best-of-3 format, with a playoff for third.

== Qualifying ==
=== Automatic qualifiers ===
Team	League	Elim. round finish	Playoff finish	Qualified as
Ateneo Blue Eagles	UAAP	1st (13-1)	Defeated UE in the Finals	UAAP champion
UE Red Warriors	UAAP	3rd (10-4)	Defeated by Ateneo in the Finals	UAAP runner-up
FEU Tamaraws	UAAP	2nd (11-3)	Eliminated by UE in the semifinals	UAAP semifinalist
UST Growling Tigers	UAAP	4th (6-8)	Eliminated by Ateneo in the semifinals	UAAP semifinalist
San Beda Red Lions	NCAA	1st (16-2)	Defeated by San Sebastian in the Finals	NCAA runner-up
San Sebastian Stags	NCAA	2nd (16-2)	Defeated San Beda in the Finals	NCAA champion
JRU Heavy Bombers	NCAA	3rd (15-3)	Eliminated by San Sebastian in the semifinals	NCAA semifinalist
Letran Knights	NCAA	4th (12-6)	Eliminated by San Beda in the semifinals	NCAA semifinalist
UV Green Lancers	CESAFI		Defeated UC in the Finals	CESAFI champion

=== Zonal qualifiers ===
Qualified to the Sweet 16

Team	League	Elim. round finish	Playoff finish	Qualified as	Zonal tournament
UM Hawks	NAASCU		Defeated by SSC-R Cavite in the Finals	NAASCU runner-up	Intramuros
Lyceum Pirates	ISAA			ISAA champion	Intramuros
Lyceum of Subic Bay Sharks	UCLAA		Defeated Holy Angel in the Finals	North/Central Luzon regional champion	Intramuros
PCU-Dasmariñas Dolphins	NCAA South		Defeated by Don Bosco in the Finals	NCAA South runner-up	Intramuros
Adamson Soaring Falcons	UAAP	5th (5-9)	Did not qualify	UAAP fifth place	Cebu City
SSC-R Cavite Baycats	NAASCU		Defeated UM in the Finals	NAASCU champion	Cebu City
UC Webmasters	CESAFI		Defeated by UV in the Finals	CESAFI runner-up	Cebu City
USJ-R Warriors	CESAFI		Defeated by USC for third place	CESAFI fourth place	Cebu City
De La Salle Green Archers	UAAP	6th (5-9)	Did not qualify	UAAP sixth place	Naga
St. Francis Doves	UCLAAI		Defeated CCP in the Finals	UCLAAI champion	Naga
UNC Greyhounds	Naga City Intercollegiate			South Luzon/Bicol regional champion	Naga
Don Bosco Grey Wolves	NCAA South		Defeated PCU-Dasmariñas in the Finals	NCAA South champion	Naga
Mapúa Cardinals	NCAA	6th (6-12)	Did not qualify	NCAA sixth place	San Miguel
CCP Bobcats	UCLAAI		Defeated by St. Francis in the Finals	UCLAAI runner-up	San Miguel
La Consolacion Scions	MMCAA			MMCAA champions	San Miguel
UC Golden Dragons	UCAA		Defeated CSM in the Finals	UCAA champions	San Miguel
Arellano Chiefs	NCAA	5th (8-10)	Did not qualify	NCAA fifth place	Bacolod
USC Warriors	CESAFI		Defeated USJ-R for third place	CESAFI third place	Bacolod
WNU Mustangs	NOPSSCEA			Visayas regional champion	Bacolod
Holy Trinity Wildcats	GenSan Intercollegiate			Mindanao regional champion	Bacolod

== Zonal qualifying ==
Qualified to the Sweet 16

=== Bacolod zonal ===
Team	W	L	PCT	GB
Arellano Chiefs	3	0	1.000	--
USC Warriors	2	1	.667	1
WNU Mustangs	1	2	.333	2
Holy Trinity Wildcats	0	3	.000	3

November 4

Arellano Chiefs	79–74	USC Warriors

West Negros University Gym, Bacolod

November 4

WNU Mustangs	93–77	Holy Trinity Wildcats

West Negros University Gym, Bacolod

November 5

Arellano Chiefs	108–47	Holy Trinity Wildcats

West Negros University Gym, Bacolod

November 5

WNU Mustangs	57–71	USC Warriors

West Negros University Gym, Bacolod

November 6

USC Warriors	86–63	Holy Trinity Wildcats

West Negros University Gym, Bacolod

November 6

WNU Mustangs	67–74	Arellano Chiefs

West Negros University Gym, Bacolod

=== Cebu City zonal ===
Team	W	L	PCT	GB	Tie
UC Webmasters	2	1	.667	--	1.014
SSC-R Cavite Baycats	2	1	.667	--	1.013
Adamson Falcons	2	1	.667	--	0.975
USJ-R Jaguars	0	3	.000	2	

November 6

USJ-R Jaguars	77–86	SSC-R Cavite Baycats

New Cebu City Coliseum, Cebu City

November 6

Adamson Falcons	78–72	UC Webmasters

New Cebu City Coliseum, Cebu City

November 7

Adamson Falcons	84–81	USJ-R Jaguars

New Cebu City Coliseum, Cebu City

November 7

SSC-R Cavite Baycats	66–74	UC Webmasters

New Cebu City Coliseum, Cebu City

November 8

USJ-R Jaguars	86–103	UC Webmasters

New Cebu City Coliseum, Cebu City

November 8

Adamson Falcons	78–88	SSC-R Cavite Baycats

New Cebu City Coliseum, Cebu City

=== Intramuros, Manila zonal ===
Team	W	L	PCT	GB
UM Hawks	3	0	1.000	--
Lyceum Pirates	2	1	.667	1
Lyceum of Subic Bay Sharks	1	2	.333	2
PCU-Dasmariñas Dolphins	0	3	.000	3

- Note: UM forfeited their Round of 16 place in favor of Lyceum as it was disqualified for fielding players who were not in the regular-season lineup.

November 10

UM Hawks	88–82	PCU-Dasmariñas Dolphins

Lyceum of the Philippines University Gym, Manila

November 10

Lyceum Pirates	100–79	Lyceum of Subic Bay Sharks

Lyceum of the Philippines University Gym, Manila

November 11

UM Hawks	83–77	Lyceum of Subic Bay Sharks

Lyceum of the Philippines University Gym, Manila

November 11

Lyceum Pirates	81–77	PCU-Dasmariñas Dolphins

Lyceum of the Philippines University Gym, Manila

November 12

PCU-Dasmariñas Dolphins	74–77	Lyceum of Subic Bay Sharks

Lyceum of the Philippines University Gym, Manila

November 12

UM Hawks	77–74	Lyceum Pirates

Lyceum of the Philippines University Gym, Manila

=== San Miguel, Manila zonal ===
Team	W	L	PCT	GB
Mapua Cardinals	3	0	1.000	--
CCP Bobcats	2	1	.667	1
La Consolacion Scions	1	2	.333	2
UC Dragons	0	3	.000	3

November 10

Mapua Cardinals	83–65	UC Dragons

La Consolacion College Gym, Manila

November 10

La Consolacion Scions	98–75	CCP Bobcats

La Consolacion College Gym, Manila

November 11

CCP Bobcats	59–95	Mapua Cardinals

La Consolacion College Gym, Manila

November 11

La Consolacion Scions	0–2	UC Dragons

La Consolacion College Gym, Manila

November 12

CCP Bobcats	77–70	UC Dragons

La Consolacion College Gym, Manila

November 12

Mapua Cardinals	78–58	La Consolacion Scions

La Consolacion College Gym, Manila

=== Naga zonal ===
Team	W	L	PCT	GB
De La Salle Green Archers	3	0	1.000	--
St. Francis Doves	2	1	.667	1
Don Bosco Grey Wolves	1	2	.333	2
UNC Greyhounds	0	3	.000	3

November 12

De La Salle Green Archers	98–44	Don Bosco Grey Wolves

University of Nueva Caceres Gym, Naga

November 12

UNC Greyhounds	98–75	CCP Bobcats

University of Nueva Caceres Gym, Naga

November 13

UNC Greyhounds	54–66	Don Bosco Grey Wolves

University of Nueva Caceres Gym, Naga

November 13

De La Salle Green Archers	52–42	St. Francis Doves

University of Nueva Caceres Gym, Naga

November 14

UNC Greyhounds	38–91	De La Salle Green Archers

University of Nueva Caceres Gym, Naga

November 14

Don Bosco Grey Wolves	68–77	St. Francis Doves

University of Nueva Caceres Gym, Naga

== Bracket ==
Round of 16
November 25 – Ynares Sports Arena
Ateneo	73
Lyceum	63
November 30 – Ormoc Superdome
JRU	62
UST	64
November 23 – Ynares Sports Arena
San Beda	91
SSC-R Cavite	50
November 28 – Filoil Flying V Arena
UV	73
Mapua	76
November 30 – Ormoc Superdome
San Sebastian (OT)	76
USC	68
November 25 – Ynares Sports Arena
Letran	83
La Salle	72
November 28 – Filoil Flying V Arena
UE	105
UC	86
November 23 – Ynares Sports Arena
FEU	69
Arellano	59

Quarter-finals
December 4 – Ynares Sports Arena
Ateneo	81
UST	72
December 2 – Ynares Sports Arena
San Beda	77
Mapua	75
December 4 – Ynares Sports Arena
San Sebastian	84
Letran	65
December 2 – Ynares Sports Arena
UE	85
FEU	86

Semi-finals
December 7 – Ynares Sports Arena
Ateneo	81
San Beda	69
December 7 - Ynares Sports Arena
San Sebastian	83
FEU (OT)	86

Best-of-3 Finals
December 9–13 - Ynares Sports Arena
Ateneo	2
FEU	1
Third place
December 9 - Ynares Sports Arena
San Beda	91
San Sebastian	85

== Finals ==
The Finals is a best-of-3 series. The team that wins two games first is named the champion.

December 9

Ateneo Blue Eagles	70–75	FEU Tamaraws

Ynares Sports Arena, Pasig

December 10

Ateneo Blue Eagles	90–63	FEU Tamaraws

Ynares Sports Arena, Pasig

December 13

Ateneo Blue Eagles	74–70	FEU Tamaraws
Ateneo wins series 2-1

Ynares Sports Arena, Pasig

== Awards ==
The awardees are:

- Most Valuable Player: Jai Reyes (Ateneo)
- Mythical Five:
  - Eric Salamat (Ateneo)
  - Jai Reyes (Ateneo)
  - RR Garcia (FEU)
  - Bambam Gamalinda (San Beda)
  - Aldrech Ramos (FEU)
- Best Coach: Norman Black (Ateneo)
- Best Referee: Buddy Cortez

Preceded by 2008	Philippine Collegiate Championship; 2009	Succeeded by 2010
