= Nike Summer League =

- First season: 2006
- Folded: 2009; 17 years ago
- Country: Philippines
- Number of teams: 27
- TV partners: Studio 23

The Nike Summer League is a defunct pre-season collegiate basketball tournament in the Philippines sponsored by Nike. Its first season started in 2006. The tournament was last held in 2009. Games were telecast on TV by Studio 23.

== Participating Schools ==
- UAAP
  - Adamson University Soaring Falcons
  - Ateneo de Manila University Blue Eagles
  - De La Salle University-Manila Green Archers
  - Far Eastern University Tamaraws
  - National University Bulldogs
  - University of the East Red Warriors
  - University of the Philippines Fighting Maroons
  - University of Santo Tomas Growling Tigers
- NCAA
  - De La Salle-College of Saint Benilde Blazers
  - Colegio de San Juan de Letran Knights
  - Jose Rizal University Heavy Bombers
  - Mapua Institute of Technology Cardinals
  - Philippine Christian University Dolphins
  - San Beda College Red Lions
  - San Sebastian College - Recoletos Stags
  - University of Perpetual Help System Dalta Altas
- NCAA South
  - Don Bosco Technical College Grey Wolves
  - Philippine Christian University-Dasmariñas Dolphins
  - San Beda College-Alabang Red Lions
- NCRAA
  - De La Salle University-Dasmariñas Patriots
  - Emilio Aguinaldo College Generals
  - Olivarez College Sea Lions
  - Polytechnic University of the Philippines Maroons
- CUSA
  - Philippine College of Criminology Enforcers
  - PMI Colleges Admirals
- Other Leagues
  - STI College Santa Rosa Olympians
  - Ateneo de Zamboanga University Blue Eagles
  - FEATI University Seahawks
  - Lyceum of the Philippines University Pirates
  - Manila Doctors College

== Tournament format ==
Its format consists of dividing the teams into 4 groups, in which a single round robin is played against other teams of the same group to determine the quarter-finalists. The top two teams from each group comprise the 8 quarter finalists. A knockout game is played between the top seed of group A and the lower seed of Group D and vice versa. The same happens between group B and C quarter finalists. The tournament goes on until 1 team becomes champion.

== 2006 season ==
=== Playoffs ===
Finals
UE Red Warriors	80
San Sebastian College-Recoletos De Cavite	71

=== Awards ===
2006 Champion

East

== 2007 season ==
=== Standings ===
==== Group A ====
Qualified for playoffs	Eliminated

Team	W	L
FEU Tamaraws	6	0
Mapua Cardinals	4	2
NU Bulldogs	3	3
ADZU Blue Eagles	3	3
CSB Blazers	3	3
UP Fighting Maroons	1	5
UST Growling Tigers	1	5

==== Group B ====
Qualified for playoffs	Eliminated

Team	W	L
De La Salle Green Archers	6	0
UE Red Warriors	5	1
PCU Dolphins	3	3
Olivarez Sealions	3	3
JRU Heavy Bombers	3	3
PMI Admirals	1	5
DLSU-D Patriots	0	6

==== Group C ====
Qualified for playoffs	Eliminated	Forfeited

Team	W	L
Ateneo Blue Eagles	6	0
San Sebastian Stags	5	1
FEATI Seahawks	4	2
Perpetual Altas	3	3
PUP Mighty Maroons	1	5
PCCr Enforcers	1	5
EAC Generals	1	5

==== Group D ====
Qualified for playoffs	Eliminated

Team	W	L
Letran Knights	6	0
Adamson Soaring Falcons	5	1
San Beda Red Lions	3	3
PCU-D Dolphins	3	3
Lyceum Pirates	3	3
San Beda-Alabang Red Lions	1	5
Don Bosco Grey Wolves	0	6

=== Playoffs ===
Quarterfinals
A1	FEU	92
D2	Adamson	71
D1	Letran	79
A2	Mapúa	87
C1	San Sebastian	79
B2	UE	101
B1	La Salle	101
C2	FEATI	85

Semifinals
A1	FEU	78
A2	Mapua	68
B2	UE	70
B1	La Salle	73

Finals
A1	FEU	83
B1	La Salle	88

=== Awards ===
2007 Champion
La Salle-Manila

- Tournament MVP: Rico Maierhofer (La Salle)
- Mythical Five:
  - Guard: TY Tang (La Salle)
  - Guard: Marcy Arellano (UE)
  - Forward: Neil Pascual (Mapúa)
  - Forward: Mac Baracael (FEU)
  - Center: Rico Maierhofer (La Salle)

== 2008 season ==
=== Team Standings ===
==== Group A ====
Qualified for playoffs	Eliminated

Team	W	L
De La Salle Green Archers	5	1
Mapua Cardinals	5	1
Adamson Falcons	5	1
EAC Generals	2	4
Metro Manila College	2	4
PCCr Enforcers	2	4
STI Santa Rosa	0	6

==== Group B ====
Qualified for playoffs	Eliminated

Team	W	L
Lyceum Pirates	6	1
San Beda Red Lions	6	0
Perpetual Altas	3	3
San Sebastian Stags	3	3
PMI Colleges Admirals	2	3
DOMC	1	4
De La Salle Lipa	0	6

==== Group C ====
Qualified for playoffs	Eliminated

Team	W	L
FEU Tamaraws	7	0
UE Red Warriors	4	2
JRU Heavy Bombers	4	3
CSB Blazers	3	4
UP Fighting Maroons	3	3
PUP Mighty Maroons	1	5
San Beda-Alabang Red Lions	1	5
Lyceum-Calamba	2	4

==== Group D ====
Qualified for playoffs	Eliminated

Team	W	L
Ateneo Blue Eagles	6	0
FEATI Seahawks	5	2
Letran Knights	5	2
NU Bulldogs	3	3
OC Sea Lions	3	3
Don Bosco Grey Wolves	2	5
Trinity Stallions	1	4
PWU Patriots	1	5
RP-Youth	1	5

=== Playoffs ===
Quarterfinals
A1	La Salle	89
D2	FEATI	67
D1	Ateneo	81
A2	Mapúa	76
C1	FEU	88
B2	Lyceum-Manila	75
B1	San Beda	87
C2	UE	91

Semifinals
A1	La Salle	60
D1	Ateneo	70
C1	FEU	66
C2	UE	74

Finals
D1	Ateneo	65
C2	UE	64

Third place
C1	FEU	74
A1	La Salle	65

=== Awards ===
2008 Champion

Ateneo

- Tournament MVP: Eric Salamat (Ateneo)
- Mythical Five:
  - Guard: Eric Salamat (Ateneo)
  - Guard: Mark Barocca (FEU)
  - Forward: PJ Barua (La Salle)
  - Forward: Rico Maierhofer (La Salle)
  - Center: Pari Llagas (UE)

== 2009 season ==
=== Team Standings ===
==== Group A ====
Qualified for playoffs	Eliminated	Forfeited

Team	W	L
Ateneo Blue Eagles	5	0
Adamson Soaring Falcons	4	1
San Sebastian Stags	3	2
EAC Generals	2	3
San Beda-Alabang Red Lions	1	4
Lyceum-Calamba Spartans	0	5

==== Group B ====
Qualified for playoffs	Eliminated

Team	W	L
San Beda Red Lions	5	0
Perpetual Altas	4	2
FEATI Seahawks	3	3
PCCr Enforcers	1	3
Manila Doctors College	0	4
UE Red Warriors	0	0

==== Group C ====
Qualified for playoffs	Eliminated

Team	W	L
FEU Tamaraws	5	0
Lyceum Pirates	3	2
Mapua Cardinals	3	2
De La Salle Green Archers	3	2
City College of Manila	1	4
STI College-Sta. Rosa	0	5

==== Group D ====
Qualified for playoffs	Eliminated

Team	W	L
JRU Heavy Bombers	5	1
Letran Knights	5	1
UP Fighting Maroons	3	2
NU Bulldogs	2	3
UST Growling Tigers	1	4
Don Bosco Grey Wolves	0	5

=== Playoffs ===
Quarterfinals
A1	Adamson	46
D2	Letran	55
D1	JRU	75
A2	San Sebastian	77
C1	FEU	89
B2	Perpetual	51
B1	San Beda	86
C2	Lyceum	70

Semifinals
D2	Letran	69
A2	San Sebastian	82
C1	FEU	72
B1	San Beda	74

Finals
A2	San Sebastian	69
B1	San Beda	85

Third place
C1	FEU	70
D2	Letran	69

=== Awards ===
2009 Champion

San Beda

- Tournament MVP: Sudan Daniel (San Beda)
- Mythical Five:
  - Guard: Ryan Roose Garcia (FEU)
  - Guard: J.R. Tecson (San Beda)
  - Forward: Jimbo Aquino (San Sebastian)
  - Forward: Reymar Gutilban (Letran)
  - Center: Sudan Daniels (San Beda)
