= 2010 PBA draft =

Player selection in Philippine basketball

General information
- Date: August 29, 2010
- Time: 4:00 pm (PHT)
- Location: Market! Market! in Fort Bonifacio, Taguig
- Network: Solar TV

Overview
- League: Philippine Basketball Association
- First selection: Nonoy Baclao, Air21 Express

The 2010 Philippine Basketball Association (PBA) rookie draft was an event held at Market! Market! in Taguig on August 29, 2010 that allowed PBA teams to draft players from the amateur ranks. Players who applied for the draft went through a rookie camp that lasted a week. The San Miguel Beermen were the only team that did not have a single pick in the draft.

== Draft lottery ==
The lottery was held on August 6, 2010, before the start of the 2010 PBA Fiesta Conference finals at the Araneta Coliseum in Quezon City. The Air21 Express beat the statistical odds by winning the first overall pick against Barako Energy Coffee Masters (draft pick was already acquired by Talk 'N Text during the draft lottery).

== Draft ==
PG	Point guard	SG	Shooting guard	SF	Small forward	PF	Power forward	C	Center	*	Mythical team member	^{#}	All-star

Round	Pick	Player	Position	Country of origin*	Team	College
1	1	Nonoy Baclao	PF	Philippines	Air21 Express	Ateneo de Manila University
1	2	Rabeh Al-Hussaini^{#}	C	Philippines	Air21 Express (from Talk 'N Text via Barako Bull)^{[a]}	Ateneo de Manila University
1	3	# Rey Guevarra	SF/SG	Philippines	Air21 Express (from Meralco)^{[b]}	Colegio de San Juan de Letran
1	4	Elmer Espiritu	SF/PF	Philippines	Talk 'N Text Tropang Texters (from Air21 via Powerade^{[b]}, traded to Alaska^{[A]})	University of the East
1	5	Josh Vanlandingham	SF/SG	United States	Rain or Shine Elasto Painters	Pacific Lutheran University
1	6	Sean Anthony*	PF/SF	Canada	Air21 Express (from Talk 'N Text^{[c]}, traded to Powerade^{[D]})	McGill University
1	7	John Wilson	SG/SF	Philippines	Barangay Ginebra Kings (from Barako Bull via San Miguel)^{[e]}	Jose Rizal University
1	8	Jimbo Aquino	SG/SF	Philippines	Barangay Ginebra Kings	San Sebastian College
1	9	Pari Llagas	C/PF	Philippines	Derby Ace Llamados	University of the East
1	10	Shawn Weinstein	PG	United States	Meralco (from Alaska Aces) ^{[B]}	St. Edward's University
2	11	Riego Gamalinda	SF	Philippines	Meralco Bolts ^{a}	San Beda College
2	12	Rob Labagala	PG	Philippines	Barangay Ginebra Kings (from Barako Bull)^{[d]}	University of the East
2	13	Val Acuña	SF/SG	Philippines	Derby Ace Llamados (from Air21)	University of the East
2	14	Ford Arao	PF	Philippines	Meralco Bolts	Ateneo de Manila University
2	15	RJ Jazul	PG/SG	Philippines	Rain or Shine (from Powerade via Alaska Aces^{[f]}, traded to Rain or Shine^{[C]})	Colegio de San Juan de Letran
2	16	Khasim Mirza	SF	Philippines	Meralco Bolts (from Powerade via Rain or Shine)	University of Santo Tomas
2	17	Borgie Hermida	PG	Philippines	Barako Energy Coffee Masters (from Talk 'N Text^{[g]})	San Beda College
2	18	Jai Reyes	PG	Philippines	Air21 Express (traded to Powerade)^{[D]}	Ateneo de Manila University
2	PASSED^{b}					
2	PASSED^{c}					
2	19	Marvin Hayes	PF/SF	Philippines	Alaska Aces	José Rizal University

Notes:

- ^a Given by the PBA board to the Meralco Bolts as an incentive of being a new team.
- ^b Powerade Tigers passed on what was their 19th overall pick.
- ^c Air21 Express passed on what was their 20th overall pick.

== Trades involving draft picks ==
=== Pre-draft trades ===
Prior to the day of the draft, the following trades were made and resulted in exchanges of draft picks between the teams.

- ^{a} On October 12, 2009, in a three-team trade, Air21 (as Burger King) acquired a first round pick and a 2012 first round pick from Barako Energy Coffee via Talk 'N Text, and 2012 and 2013 first round picks from the Tropang Texters; the Coffee Masters acquired Orlando Daroya from the Tropang Texters; and the Tropang Texters acquired Japeth Aguilar from the Whoppers. Aguilar was on loan to the national team (Gilas) at that time.
- ^{b 1} ^{2} On August 20, 2010, in a three-team trade, Talk 'N Text acquired a first round pick from Air21, the Express acquired Josh Urbiztondo and a first round pick from Meralco, and the Bolts acquired Mark Cardona from the Tropang Texters via the Express. Previously, Sta. Lucia acquired the pick and Chris Ross on May 19, 2010, from Powerade (as Coca-Cola) in exchange for Paolo Mendoza. The Realtors franchise was sold to Meralco in the 2010 off-season.
- ^{c} On March 3, 2010, Air21 acquired a first round pick, Yancy de Ocampo and Renren Ritualo from Talk 'N Text in exchange for J. R. Quiñahan, Mark Yee and Aaron Aban.
- ^{d} On February 10, 2009, Barako Bull acquired a second round pick from Barangay Ginebra in exchange for Alex Crisano.
- ^{e} In November 2008, Barangay Ginebra acquired a first round pick from Barako Bull in exchange for Mike Holper. Previously, Barako Bull previously acquired the pick from San Miguel during the 2008 off-season in exchange for Mick Pennisi.
- ^{f} On September 1, 2008, Alaska acquired Joe Devance and 2009 and 2010 second round picks from Rain or Shine in exchange for Eddie Laure and the draft rights to Sol Mercado.
- ^{g} On May 12, 2010, Barako Bull acquired a second round pick and Mark Isip from Talk 'N Text in a three-team trade with Sta. Lucia. The Tropang Texters acquired Kelly Williams, Ryan Reyes and Charles Waters from Sta. Lucia, and the Realtors acquired Ali Peek, Nic Belasco, Pong Escobal, Rogemar Menor and Yousif Aljamal from Talk 'N Text.

=== Draft-day trades ===
- ^{A} The Alaska Aces acquired the draft rights to 4th pick Elmer Espiritu from Talk 'N Text in exchange for Larry Fonacier.
- ^{B} The Meralco Bolts acquired the draft rights to 10th pick of Alaska and picks Shawn Weinstein in exchange for Bonbon Custodio.
- ^{C} The Rain or Shine Elasto Painters acquired the draft rights of 15th pick of Alaska and picks RJ Jazul in exchange for a 2011 second round pick.
- ^{D 1} ^{2} The Powerade Tigers acquired the draft rights to 18th pick Jai Reyes, Ren-Ren Ritualo and newly drafted rookie Sean Anthony from Air21 in exchange for a 2011 second round pick and a 2012 first round picks
