= Jai Reyes =

Filipino basketball player

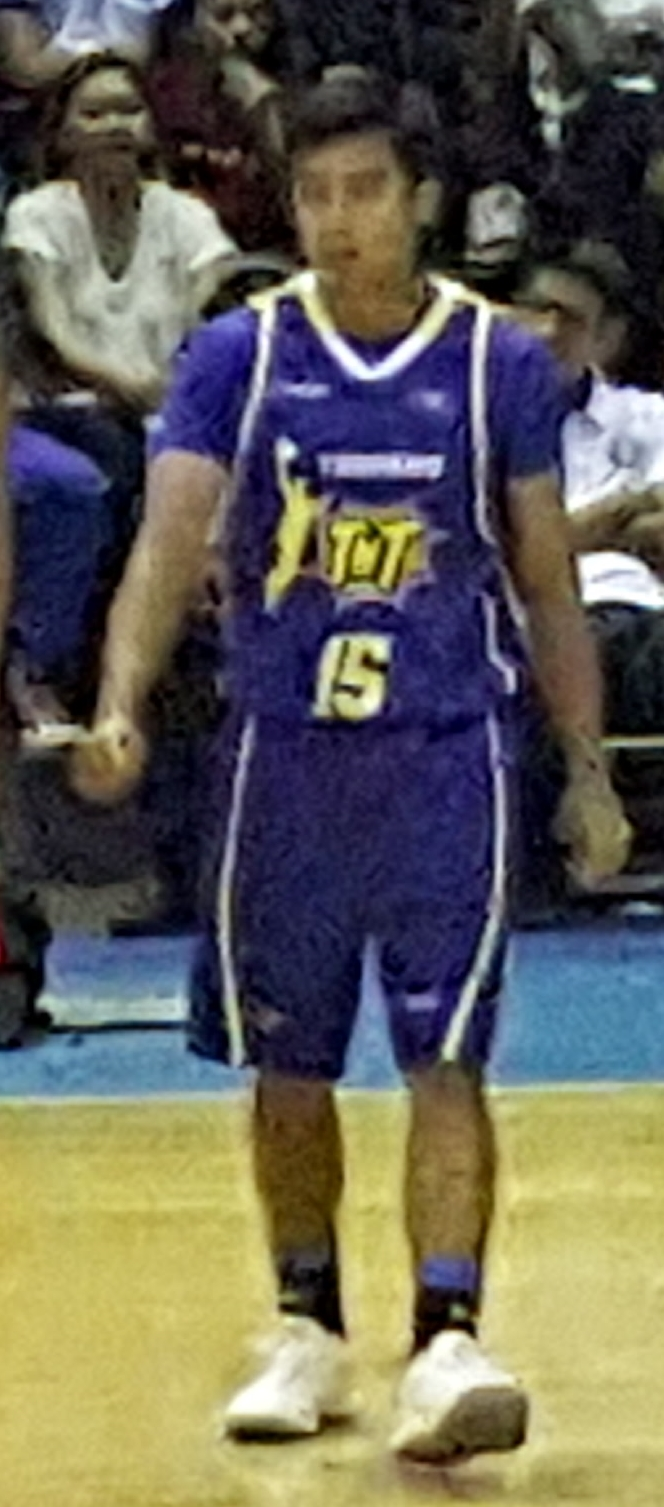
- Reyes with the TNT Tropang Texters in 2016

Personal information
- Born: February 25, 1987 (age 39) Quezon City, Philippines
- Listed height: 5 ft 7 in (1.70 m)
- Listed weight: 150 lb (68 kg)

Career information
- High school: Ateneo (Quezon City)
- College: Ateneo
- PBA draft: 2010: 2nd round, 18th overall pick
- Drafted by: Air21 Express
- Playing career: 2010–2021
- Position: Point guard

Career history
- 2010–2011: Powerade Tigers
- 2011–2012: Cebuana Lhuillier Gems
- 2012: Bangkok Cobras
- 2012–2013: Saigon Heat
- 2013–2014: Talk 'N Text Tropang Texters
- 2015: Meralco Bolts
- 2015–2016: TNT Tropang Texters / Tropang TNT / TNT KaTropa
- 2018: Laguna Heroes
- 2018–2019: Navotas Clutch
- 2019: Bataan Risers
- 2019–2021: Nueva Ecija Rice Vanguards

Career highlights
- All-MPBL Second Team (2019); MPBL All-Star (2020); 2× UAAP champion (2008, 2009); UAAP Rookie of the Year (2005); PCCL Finals MVP (2009)

Jose Antonio Gonzales Reyes (born February 25, 1987) is a Filipino former professional basketball player who is the commissioner of basketball for the University Athletic Association of the Philippines (UAAP). He previously played for the Ateneo de Manila University where he spent his elementary, high school, and college years.

In 2010, Reyes was selected by the Barako Bull Energy with the 18th pick but was later traded to the Powerade Tigers. He played in the PBA until 2016. In 2018, he returned to basketball, this time with the Laguna Heroes of the Maharlika Pilipinas Basketball League (MPBL). During his playing career, he has also gained the nicknames Jainamite and the Bangkok Mamba.

In 2021, Reyes founded FilBasket (now known as AsiaBasket), and in 2025, he was named UAAP basketball commissioner.

Reyes also hosted several television programs on GMA Network. He was formerly a host of For the Win, a sports talk segment of GMANews.tv. Prior to joining GMA Network, he also had a hosting stint on Studio 23.

== Early life and collegiate career ==
Reyes first attended the Ateneo de Manila University in grade school. He then attended the same university in high school, where he played for the Ateneo Blue Eaglets. It was during this time when he first became well known as a scorer due to the two consecutive three-point shots he made which won Game 1 of the 2003 UAAP Juniors' Basketball Finals for the Eaglets. The following year, he led the Eaglets to another title and became a member of the Mythical Five as well as the Finals MVP.

He attended the Ateneo de Manila University Loyola Schools where he obtained a degree in Communications Technology Management and also played for the Ateneo Blue Eagles who he helped win back-to-back UAAP senior men's basketball championships from 2008 to 2009.

== Professional career ==
He was drafted 18th overall in the 2010 PBA draft by the Powerade Tigers and played for the team until 2011. Afterwards, he played for the Cebuana Lhuillier Gems in the PBA Developmental League before moving to the Bangkok Cobras of the ABL.

== PBA career statistics ==
Legend
GP	Games played	MPG	Minutes per game
FG%	Field-goal percentage	3P%	3-point field-goal percentage	FT%	Free-throw percentage
RPG	Rebounds per game	APG	Assists per game	SPG	Steals per game
BPG	Blocks per game	PPG	Points per game	**Bold**	Career high

=== Season-by-season averages ===
Year	Team	GP	MPG	FG%	3P%	FT%	RPG	APG	SPG	BPG	PPG
2010–11	Powerade	21	10.3	.309	.267	.812	1.3	**1.3**	.3	.0	2.6
2012–13	Talk 'N Text	4	**15.8**	.308	.250	**.889**	.5	1.8	**.8**	.0	**4.8**
2013–14	Talk 'N Text	**25**	5.6	.298	.281	.833	.5	.4	.3	**.1**	1.7
2014–15	Talk 'N Text / Meralco	11	10.7	.243	.263	.778	.6	.9	.2	.0	2.7
2015–16	Talk 'N Text	21	10.6	**.324**	**.358**	.800	**1.6**	.8	.2	.0	3.9
Career		82	9.3	.300	.301	.817	1.0	.9	.3	.0	2.8

== Basketball ventures ==
In 2021, while with the Nueva Ecija Rice Vanguards, Reyes founded the Filipino Basketball League (shortened to FilBasket). A league intended to give players affected by the COVID-19 pandemic a chance to revitalize their playing careers. The league went on to be expanded into AsiaBasket in 2023.

In 2025, Reyes was named commissioner for the UAAP basketball tournaments beginning with Season 88, succeeding Xavy Nunag, who had served as commissioner since Season 86.

== Filmography ==
- For the Win
- Unang Hirit
- Show Me Da Manny
- Pinoy Records
- Wild Card

Preceded by JVee Casio	PCCL Finals MVP; 2009	Succeeded by Nico Salva
