= Don Bosco Grey Wolves =

Collegiate varsity team in Philippines

- School: Don Bosco Technical College
- League: National Collegiate Athletic Association (Philippines) South
- Joined: 2004
- Location: Mandaluyong, Metro Manila
- Team colors: █ Navy Blue █ White █ Grey

Seniors' general championships
- NCAA-South: none

The Don Bosco Grey Wolves is the collegiate men's varsity team of Don Bosco Technical College, Mandaluyong in the National Collegiate Athletic Association (Philippines) – South. Don Bosco Technical College is a newcomer in mainstream inter-collegiate athletic competitions, having joined the NCAA-South only in 2004.

In 2007, Don Bosco Technical College played host to the NCAA-South.

== Mascot ==
Grigio, which is Italian for grey, is the mascot of the Don Bosco Grey Wolves. He was named after the mysterious grey dog who served as St. John Bosco's protector during several attempts made on the priest's life. Years after Don Bosco's death, the dog reappeared several times as protector of the Salesian Sisters.

== See also ==
- Don Bosco Technical College, Mandaluyong
- National Collegiate Athletic Association (Philippines) South
