= Rabeh Al-Hussaini =

Filipino basketball player

Personal information
- Born: August 11, 1988 (age 38) Makati, Philippines
- Listed height: 6 ft 7 in (2.01 m)
- Listed weight: 240 lb (109 kg)

Career information
- High school: PCU (Manila)
- College: Ateneo
- PBA draft: 2010: 1st round, 2nd overall pick
- Drafted by: Air21 Express
- Playing career: 2010–present
- Position: Center

Career history
- 2010–2011: Air21 Express
- 2011–2012: San Miguel Beermen / Petron Blaze Boosters
- 2012: Powerade Tigers
- 2012: GlobalPort Batang Pier
- 2013: Talk 'N Text Tropang Texters
- 2013–2014: Meralco Bolts
- 2014–2015: Qadsia SC
- 2015–2017: Meralco Bolts
- 2017–2018: NLEX Road Warriors
- 2018–2019: Blackwater Elite
- 2024: Manila Batang Sampaloc
- 2025: Basilan Viva Portmasters

Career highlights
- PBA champion (2011 Governors'); 3× PBA All-Star (2011, 2012, 2017); PBA Rookie of the Year (2011); PBA All-Rookie Team (2011); MPBL All-Star (2024); 2× UAAP champion (2008, 2009); UAAP Most Valuable Player (2008); UAAP Finals Most Valuable Player (2009)

Rabeh Ahmed T. Al-Hussaini (born August 11, 1988) is a Filipino professional basketball player who last played for the Basilan Viva Portmasters of the Maharlika Pilipinas Basketball League. A power forward/center, he played five seasons for the Ateneo de Manila Blue Eagles in the University Athletic Association of the Philippines from 2005 to 2009 and led the Eagles to back-to-back basketball championships in his last two seasons with them. He averaged 24.6 point per game, 13 rebounds per game, and 2 assists per game.

== Professional career ==
=== Philippine Basketball Association ===
Al-Hussaini entered the 2010 PBA draft, and was selected as the second overall pick by the Air21 Express. It was expected that either he or Nonoy Baclao, his Ateneo teammate, were to go Number 1 in the draft. Baclao was eventually drafted first overall by the Express.

On October 8, 2010, Al-Hussaini made his PBA debut with 16 points, 11 rebounds, and 1 assist in a loss to the San Miguel Beermen.

=== Kuwaiti Division I Basketball League ===
He signed with Kuwaiti Division I Basketball League team Al Qadsia.

== PBA career statistics ==
Legend
GP	Games played	MPG	Minutes per game
FG%	Field-goal percentage	3P%	3-point field-goal percentage	FT%	Free-throw percentage
RPG	Rebounds per game	APG	Assists per game	SPG	Steals per game
BPG	Blocks per game	PPG	Points per game	**Bold**	Career high

Correct as of October 19, 2016

=== Season-by-season averages ===
Year	Team	GP	MPG	FG%	3P%	FT%	RPG	APG	SPG	BPG	PPG
2010–11	Air21 / Petron	37	**28.4**	.418	.000	**.670**	**6.9**	**1.1**	**.1**	**.6**	**14.2**
2011–12	Petron / Powerade	13	16.5	.393	.000	.667	2.9	.5	**.1**	.2	5.9
2012–13	GlobalPort / Talk 'N Text	**42**	17.0	.401	.000	.644	3.8	.8	**.1**	.2	6.8
2013–14	Meralco	23	16.7	.341	.000	.651	5.0	.7	.0	.4	5.0
2015–16	Meralco	23	12.4	**.487**	.000	.542	2.2	.4	**.1**	.4	5.4
Career		138	19.2	.410	.000	.652	4.5	.8	.1	.4	8.2
