= UAAP Season 72 =

University athletic year

- "One Color. One Goal"
- Host school: Far Eastern University

Overall
- Seniors: University of Santo Tomas
- Juniors: University of Santo Tomas

Seniors' champions
Sport		Men	Women
Basketball		Ateneo	Adamson
Volleyball		UST	UST
Chess		FEU	FEU
Table tennis		FEU	FEU
Taekwondo		UST	FEU
Judo		Ateneo	UP
Swimming		La Salle	UP
Beach Volleyball		UST	Adamson
Track and field		UE	FEU
Football		FEU	La Salle
Fencing		UE	UE
Tennis		UST	La Salle
Badminton		UST	La Salle
Baseball		Adamson	N/A
Softball		N/A	UST
- Cheerdance: FEU (Ex - Coed)

Juniors' champions
Sport		Boys	Girls
Basketball		Ateneo	N/A
Volleyball		UE	UST
Chess		Adamson	
Table tennis		UE	
Taekwondo		UST	
Judo		Ateneo	
Swimming		Ateneo	UST
Beach Volleyball		UP	
Track and field		Ateneo	
Football		Ateneo	
- (NT) = No tournament; (DS) = Demonstration Sport; (Ex) = Exhibition;

UAAP Season 72 was the 2009–2010 season of the University Athletic Association of the Philippines. It was hosted by Far Eastern University, with opening rites on July 11, 2009 at the Araneta Coliseum. The men's basketball tournament and the women's volleyball tournament were aired by ABS-CBN's UHF Studio 23 for the tenth consecutive year.

== Opening ceremonies ==
The opening ceremonies for the 72nd UAAP games was held at the Araneta Coliseum last July 11, 2009. The opening rites featured different student organizations from the host Far Eastern University including other participants from the other 7 UAAP member universities. With the season's theme One Color. One Goal. the event participants wore white costumes, symbolizing unity in the league, introduced the league member universities through flags and the sarimanok, bearing the member schools' respective colors.

== Calendar changes ==
The schedule of the sporting events will be changed this season. Badminton will be held in the first semester, instead of chess.

== Television coverage rights ==
With ABS-CBN's contract to broadcast the UAAP expiring on March 31, 2010, two other TV networks are bidding for exclusive television rights for the league, although ABS-CBN has the right of first refusal. Solar Entertainment Corporation's sports section Solar Sports will join the bidding for the TV rights, with a Solar official naming GMA Network as another interested party. The UAAP has been broadcast by ABS-CBN for ten years already at their UHF station Studio 23. UAAP president Anton Montinola said the league considers "to project the league not just nationally but also globally" due to "a lot of followers abroad, mostly alumni". Montinola further said the league has been satisfied with ABS-CBN's coverage of both the basketball and volleyball games. The volleyball tournament was even moved from the first semester (July–October) to the second semester (November–March) to maximize the TV coverage.

Confirming Solar's earlier revelation, GMA has joined the bidding, submitting theirs at a UAAP board meeting on March 19, 2009. In order to strengthen its position, ABS-CBN's bid includes airing the men's basketball championship series at their flagship VHF station Channel 2 instead of airing it on Studio 23, where ABS-CBN has aired the men's basketball tournament for the past nine seasons. Solar will air it on VHF C/S 9 of which they a block-timer. All three submitted five-year bids. GMA will air the games on its VHF channel Q.

Despite the TV rights row on the Pacquiao-Hatton boxing bout between ABS-CBN on one hand and Solar Sports and GMA on the other, Solar has confirmed it will stand by their UAAP bid, with Solar offering a possible linkage either to ABS-CBN's The Filipino Channel (on which the games currently air) or to GMA Pinoy TV to air the games internationally. With ABS-CBN's current contract worth P75 million, Montinola has expressed delight that "there are three TV networks that are very, very much interested to become our partner next season," noting that it is "the first time that this is happening." Montinola clarified that the UAAP is not "rushing things" to determine which among the three networks have the best offer, and declined to comment on the financial offers, saying, "We [UAAP, GMA 7, ABS-CBN and Solar] are still far from that discussion."

On October 4, right before the tip-off of Game 2 of the men's basketball finals, the UAAP and ABS-CBN agreed in principle and signed a memorandum of agreement giving the broadcasting network the right to air the league's games for another five-year period starting UAAP Season 73.

== Basketball ==
The UAAP Season 72 basketball tournament began on July 11, 2009 at the Araneta Coliseum in Cubao, Quezon City. The tournament host was Far Eastern University and tournament commissioner was Jose "Joe" Lipa, Jr.

=== Men's tournament ===
The opening ceremonies and the opening day doubleheader were the first programs in the Philippines to be broadcast in high definition, although only SkyCable subscribers with HD boxes were able to watch them.

==== Team standings ====
Pos	Team	W	L	PCT	GB	Qualification
1	Ateneo Blue Eagles	13	1	.929	—	Twice-to-beat in the semifinals
2	FEU Tamaraws (H)	11	3	.786	2	Twice-to-beat in the semifinals
3	UE Red Warriors	10	4	.714	3	Twice-to-win in the semifinals
4	UST Growling Tigers	6	8	.429	7	Twice-to-win in the semifinals
5	Adamson Soaring Falcons	5	9	.357 (Note: Head-to-head record: Adamson 1–1 La Salle (Adamson +5))	8	
6	De La Salle Green Archers	5	9	.357	8	
7	NU Bulldogs	3	11	.214 (Note: Head-to-head record: NU 1–1 UP (NU +8))	10	
8	UP Fighting Maroons	3	11	.214	10	

Source: ABS-CBN Sports
Rules for classification: 1) winning percentage; 2) if tied for #2 or #4, one-game playoff; 3) head-to-head record; 4) head-to-head point differential; 5) overall point differential
(H) Hosts

==== Playoffs ====
Semifinals (Top 2 twice-to-beat)
1	Ateneo	81
4	UST	64
2	FEU	74	72
3	UE	84	78

Finals (Best-of-three playoff)
1	Ateneo	78	68	71
3	UE	71	88	58

==== Awards ====
- Most Valuable Player: Dylan Ababou (UST Growling Tigers)
- Rookie of the Year: Jeric Teng (UST Growling Tigers)

=== Women's tournament ===
==== Team standings ====
Pos	Team	W	L	PCT	GB	Qualification
1	FEU Lady Tamaraws (H)	13	1	.929	—	Twice-to-beat in the semifinals
2	Adamson Lady Falcons	11	3	.786 (Note: Second-seed playoff: Adamson 65–56 La Salle)	2	Twice-to-beat in the semifinals
3	De La Salle Lady Archers	11	3	.786	2	Twice-to-win in the semifinals
4	UST Growling Tigresses	8	6	.571	5	Twice-to-win in the semifinals
5	UP Lady Maroons	5	9	.357	8	
6	Ateneo Lady Eagles	4	10	.286	9	
7	NU Lady Bulldogs	3	11	.214	10	
8	UE Lady Warriors	1	13	.071	12	

Source: ABS-CBN Sports
Rules for classification: 1) winning percentage; 2) if tied for #2 or #4, one-game playoff; 3) head-to-head record; 4) head-to-head point differential; 5) overall point differential
(H) Hosts

==== Playoffs ====
Semifinals (Top 2 twice-to-beat)
1	FEU	74
4	UST	71
2	Adamson	55
3	La Salle	50

Finals (Best-of-three playoff)
1	FEU	51	50
2	Adamson	58	64

==== Awards ====
- Most Valuable Player: Analyn Almasan (Adamson Lady Falcons)
- Rookie of the Year: Miller Joy Ong (De La Salle Lady Archers)

=== Boys' tournament ===
==== Team standings ====
Pos	Team	W	L	PCT	GB	Qualification
1	Zobel Junior Archers	12	2	.857	—	Twice-to-beat in the semifinals
2	UST Tiger Cubs	11	3	.786	1	Twice-to-beat in the semifinals
3	Ateneo Blue Eaglets	10	4	.714 (Note: Head-to-head record: Ateneo 1–1 FEU (Ateneo +4))	2	Twice-to-win in the semifinals
4	FEU–D Baby Tamaraws (H)	10	4	.714	2	Twice-to-win in the semifinals
5	UE Junior Red Warriors	6	8	.429	6	
6	Adamson Baby Falcons	5	9	.357	7	
7	NUNS Bullpups	2	12	.143	10	
8	UPIS Junior Fighting Maroons	0	14	.000	12	

Source: ABS-CBN Sports
Rules for classification: 1) winning percentage; 2) if tied for #2 or #4, one-game playoff; 3) head-to-head record; 4) head-to-head point differential; 5) overall point differential
(H) Hosts

==== Playoffs ====
Semifinals (Top 2 twice-to-beat)
1	DLSZ	86
4	FEU–FERN	69
2	UST	66	68
3	Ateneo	72	73

Finals (Best-of-three playoff)
1	DLSZ	73	57	56
3	Ateneo	80	53	61

==== Awards ====
- Most Valuable Player: Terrence Romeo (FEU Tamaraws)
- Rookie of the Year: Kevin Ferrer (UST Growling Tigers)

== Volleyball ==
=== Men's tournament ===
==== Team standings ====
Team	W	L	PCT	GB	Tie
UST Growling Tigers	13	1	.929	-	
FEU Tamaraws	11	3	.786	2	
Ateneo Blue Eagles	8	6	.571	5	
UP Fighting Maroons	7	7	.500	6	
De La Salle Green Archers	7	7	.500	6	
UE Red Warriors	5	9	.357	9	
NU Bulldogs	3	11	.214	10	
Adamson Soaring Falcons	2	12	.143	11	

- Qualified to the semifinals with the twice-to-beat advantage
- Qualified to the semifinals
- Qualified to fourth-seed playoff

==== Playoffs ====
Fourth-seed playoff
UP	3
La Salle	0

Semifinals; Top seeds twice-to-beat
1	UST	3
4	UP	0
2	FEU	3
3	Ateneo	1

Finals; Best-of-three series
1	UST	3	3
2	FEU	0	0

==== Awards ====
- Finals Most Valuable Player: Henry James Pecaña (UST Growling Tigers)
- Season Most Valuable Player: Andre Joseph Pareja (Ateneo Blue Eagles)
- Rookie of the Year: Christopher Michael Antonio (De La Salle Green Archers)

=== Women's tournament ===
==== Team standings ====
Team	W	L	PCT	GB
De La Salle Lady Archers	13	1	.929	-
UST Growling Tigresses	12	2	.857	1
Ateneo Lady Eagles	10	4	.714	3
Adamson Lady Falcons	9	5	.643	4
FEU Lady Tamaraws	6	8	.429	7
UP Lady Maroons	4	10	.286	9
UE Lady Warriors	1	13	.071	12
NU Lady Bulldogs	1	13	.071	12

- Qualified to the semifinals with the twice-to-beat advantage
- Qualified to the semifinals

==== Playoffs ====
Semifinals (Nos. 1 & 2 have twice-to-beat advantage)
1	La Salle	3
4	Adamson	1
2	UST	3
3	Ateneo	0

Finals (Best-of-three series)
1	La Salle	1	1
2	UST	3	3

==== Awards ====
- Finals Most Valuable Player: Rhea Dimaculangan (UST Growling Tigresses)
- Season Most Valuable Player: Cherry May Vivas (FEU Lady Tamaraws)
- Rookie of the Year: Joanne Siy (De La Salle Lady Archers)

== Baseball ==
=== Men's tournament ===
==== Team standings ====
Team	W	L	PCT	GB
Adamson Soaring Falcons	8	2	.800	--
NU Bulldogs	7	3	.700	1
UP Fighting Maroons	6	4	.600	2
De La Salle Green Archers	5	5	.500	3
UST Growling Tigers	4	6	.400	4
Ateneo Blue Eagles	0	10	.000	8

Qualified to the semifinals with the twice-to-beat advantage
Qualified to the semifinals

==== Playoffs ====
Semifinals (Nos. 1 & 2 have twice-to-beat advantage)
1	Adamson	10
4	La Salle	6
2	NU	5	16
3	UP	20	0

Finals (Best-of-three series)
1	Adamson	3	10
2	NU	1	5

==== Awards ====
- Most Valuable Player:
- Rookie of the Year:
- Most Improved Player:

== Taekwondo ==
The UAAP Season 72 taekwondo tournaments were held on September 16, 2009 at the University of Santo Tomas Gymnasium.

=== Men's tournament ===
==== Team standings ====
Team	W	L	GB
UST Growling Tigers	5	0	--
De La Salle Green Archers	4	1	1
Ateneo Blue Eagles	2	3	3
FEU Tamaraws	2	3	3
UP Fighting Maroons	2	3	3
UE Red Warriors	0	5	5

==== Awards ====
- Most Valuable Player: Marlon Avenido (UST Growling Tigers)
- Rookie of the Year: Jose Anthony Soriano (UST Growling Tigers)

=== Women's tournament ===
==== Team standings ====
Team	W	L	GB
FEU Lady Tamaraws	5	0	--
UST Growling Tigresses	3	2	2
De La Salle Lady Archers	3	2	2
UP Lady Maroons	3	2	2
Ateneo Lady Eagles	1	4	4
UE Lady Warriors	0	5	5

==== Awards ====
- Most Valuable Player: Richelle Dinolan (FEU Lady Tamaraws)
- Rookie of the Year: Winlove Dela Cerna (FEU Lady Tamaraws)

=== Boys' tournament ===
==== Team standings ====
Team	W	L	GB
UST Tiger Cubs	4	0	--
FEU–D Baby Tamaraws	3	1	1
Ateneo Blue Eaglets	2	2	2
UPIS Junior Fighting Maroons			-
Zobel Junior Archers			-
UE Junior Red Warriors			-

==== Awards ====
- Most Valuable Player: Keiffer Mikhael Cedro (FEU–D Baby Tamaraws)
- Rookie of the Year: Clint Ferrer (UST Tiger Cubs)

== Badminton ==
=== Men's tournament ===
==== Elimination round ====
===== Team standings =====
Team	W	L	PCT	Matches W–L
Ateneo Blue Eagles	6	1	1.000	26-4
UP Fighting Maroons	6	1	.833	22-8
De La Salle Green Archers	5	2	.667	21–9
UST Growling Tigers	5	2	.667	20–10
UE Red Warriors	3	4	.500	13–17
FEU Tamaraws	2	5	.167	6–19
NU Bulldogs	1	6	.167	9–21
Adamson Soaring Falcons	0	7	.000	0–30

Qualified to the semifinals

==== Playoffs ====
Semi-finals
Ateneo	1
UST	4
UP	2
La Salle	3

Final
UST	3
La Salle	2
Third place
Ateneo	3
UP	2

==== Awards ====
- Most Valuable Player: Paolo Dawal (UST Growling Tigers)
- Rookie of the Year: Toby Gadi (Ateneo Blue Eagles)
- Most Improved Player: Salvador Kapunan (UST Growling Tigers)

=== Women's tournament ===
==== Elimination round ====
===== Team standings =====
Team	W	L	PCT
De La Salle Lady Archers	7	0	1.000
FEU Lady Tamaraws	6	1	.857
Adamson Lady Falcons	5	2	.714
UE Lady Warriors	4	3	.571
UST Growling Tigresses	2	5	.286
UP Lady Maroons	2	5	.286
Ateneo Lady Eagles	1	6	.143
NU Lady Bulldogs	1	6	.143

Qualified to the semifinals

==== Playoffs ====
Semi-finals
La Salle	3
Adamson	2
FEU	2
UE	3

Final
La Salle	3
UE	1
Third place
Adamson	2
FEU	3

==== Awards ====
- Most Valuable Player: Descka Calimlim (De La Salle Lady Archers)
- Rookie of the Year: Danica Bolos (De La Salle Lady Archers)
- Most Improved Player: Rochelle Reyes (FEU Lady Tamaraws)

== Judo ==
The UAAP Judo Championships was held on October 4, 2009 hosted by the Ateneo de Manila University at the Blue Eagle Gym. It was a one-day tournament.

=== Men's tournament ===
==== Team standings ====
Team	Medals				Points
Team	1st place, gold medalist(s)	2nd place, silver medalist(s)	3rd place, bronze medalist(s)	Total	Points
Ateneo	2	1	5	8	35
UST	2				
UP					
La Salle					
UE					
Adamson					

==== Awards ====
- Most Valuable Player:
- Rookie of the Year:

=== Women's tournament ===
==== Team standings ====
Team	Medals				Points
Team	1st place, gold medalist(s)	2nd place, silver medalist(s)	3rd place, bronze medalist(s)	Total	Points
UP					
UST					
La Salle					
Ateneo					
UE					
Adamson					

==== Awards ====
- Most Valuable Player:
- Rookie of the Year:

=== Boys' tournament ===
==== Team standings ====
Team	Medals				Points
Team	1st place, gold medalist(s)	2nd place, silver medalist(s)	3rd place, bronze medalist(s)	Total	Points
Ateneo					
UE					
UST					
La Salle					
UP					

==== Awards ====
- Most Valuable Player:
- Rookie of the Year:

== Track and field ==
The UAAP Track and Field Championships was held on February 7, 2010 at the Rizal Memorial Track and Football Stadium.

=== Men's tournament ===
==== Team standings ====
Team	Medals				Points
Team	1st place, gold medalist(s)	2nd place, silver medalist(s)	3rd place, bronze medalist(s)	Total	Points
UE	4	8	6	18	196
FEU	8	3	5	17	182
Ateneo	6	3	3	12	145
UST	3	5	5	13	142
La Salle					70
UP					67

==== Awards ====
- Most Valuable Player: Romnick Herida (FEU Tamaraws)
- Rookie of the Year: Richard Salano (UE Red Warriors)

=== Women's tournament ===
==== Team standings ====
Team	Medals				Points
Team	1st place, gold medalist(s)	2nd place, silver medalist(s)	3rd place, bronze medalist(s)	Total	Points
FEU	5	12	6	23	304
UST	12	2	3	17	253
UE	1	2	3	6	106
Ateneo					74
UP					63
La Salle					38

==== Awards ====
- Most Valuable Player: Serenata Saluan (UST Growling Tigresses)
- Rookie of the Year: Serenata Saluan (UST Growling Tigresses)

=== Boys' tournament ===
==== Team standings ====
Team	Medals				Points
Team	1st place, gold medalist(s)	2nd place, silver medalist(s)	3rd place, bronze medalist(s)	Total	Points
UP					305
Ateneo					299
UST					188
Adamson					
La Salle					
UE					
FEU					

==== Awards ====
- Most Valuable Player: Patrick Unso (UST Tiger Cubs)
- Rookie of the Year: Christian Ferrer (UPIS Junior Fighting Maroons)

== Chess ==
The UAAP Season 72 chess tournament started on January 10, 2010 at the Tan Yan Kee Student Center of the University of Santo Tomas. After fourteen rounds, the FEU Tamaraws came up on top, dominating both the Seniors Men and Women Tournaments. It could have scored a first ever triple championship in the UAAP Chess competition but its juniors team finished second to the Baby Falcons of Adamson.

=== Men's tournament ===
==== Team standings ====
Team	Points
FEU Tamaraws	42.0
UE Red Warriors	35.5
UST Growling Tigers	34.5
De La Salle Green Archers	29.0
UP Fighting Maroons	25.0
Adamson Soaring Falcons	24.5
NU Bulldogs	23.5
Ateneo Blue Eagles	10.0

==== Awards ====
- Most Valuable Player: Sheider Nebato (FEU Tamaraws)
- Rookie of the Year: MJ Turqueza (De La Salle Green Archers)

=== Women's tournament ===
==== Team standings ====
Team	Points
FEU Lady Tamaraws	34.5
Ateneo Lady Eagles	31.5
De La Salle Lady Archers	29.5
UP Lady Maroons	22.5
NU Lady Bulldogs	20.0
UST Growling Tigresses	19.0
UE Lady Warriors	11.5

==== Awards ====
- Most Valuable Player: Chardine Camacho (Ateneo Lady Eagles)
- Rookie of the Year: Chardine Camacho (Ateneo Lady Eagles)

=== Boys' tournament ===
==== Team standings ====
Team	Points
Adamson Baby Falcons	36.0
FEU–D Baby Tamaraws	35.5
UE Junior Red Warriors	34.5
NUNS Bullpups	26.0
Ateneo Blue Eaglets	25.5
UST Tiger Cubs	9.0
Zobel Junior Archers	1.5

==== Awards ====
- Most Valuable Player: Jesse Abucejo (Adamson Baby Falcons)
- Rookie of the Year: Robert Paul Evangelista (FEU–D Baby Tamaraws)

== Cheerdance ==
The UAAP Cheerdance Competition was held on September 13, 2009 at the Araneta Coliseum in Quezon City. The event was shown live on TV by Studio 23 and was hosted by Boom Gonzalez, Megan Young and the various UAAP courtside reporters. Cheer dance competition is an exhibition event. Points for the general championship are not awarded to the participants.

Order	Pep squad	Score
8th	**FEU Cheering Squad**	86.10
6th	Ateneo Blue Babble Battalion; Stunner awardee: Sari Campos	83.40
5th	UP Pep Squad	83.10
3rd	UST Salinggawi Dance Troupe	81.00
2nd	NU Pep Squad	no results released
1st	Adamson Pep Squad	no results released
4th	DLSU Animo Squad	no results released
7th	UE Pep Squad	no results released

Host team in boldface. "Order" refers to order of performance.

== General championship summary ==
The general champion is determined by a point system. The system gives 15 points to the champion team of a UAAP event, 12 to the runner-up, and 10 to the third placer. The following points: 8, 6, 4, 2 and 1 are given to the rest of the participating teams according to their order of finish.

=== Medals table ===
==== Seniors' division ====
Rank	Team	Gold	Silver	Bronze	Total
1	University of Santo Tomas	7	10	2	19
2	Far Eastern University*	7	5	4	16
3	De La Salle University	4	4	8	16
4	University of the East	3	3	1	7
5	Adamson University	3	1	0	4
6	Ateneo de Manila University	2	4	6	12
7	University of the Philippines Diliman	2	0	7	9
8	National University	0	1	0	1
Totals (8 entries)		**28**	**28**	**28**	**84**

* Host nation (Season host); General champions
Notes: Results are final.

==== Juniors' division ====
Rank	Team	Gold	Silver	Bronze	Total
1	Ateneo de Manila University	5	1	2	8
2	University of Santo Tomas	3	3	4	10
3	University of the East	2	4	1	7
4	UP Integrated School	1	0	1	2
5	Adamson University	1	0	0	1
6	Far Eastern University–FERN College*	0	3	0	3
7	De La Salle Zobel	0	1	3	4
8	National University	0	0	1	1
Totals (8 entries)		**12**	**12**	**12**	**36**

* Host nation (Season host); General champions
Notes: Results are final.

=== General championship tally ===
==== Seniors' division ====
		Basketball		Volleyball (indoor)		Volleyball (beach)		Swimming		Chess		Tennis		Table tennis		Badminton		Taekwondo		Judo		Baseball	Softball	Football		Athletics		Fencing		Total		
Rank	Team	M	W	M	W	M	W	M	W	M	W	M	W	M	W	M	W	M	W	M	W	M	W	M	W	M	W	M	W	M	W	Overall
1	UST	8	8	15	15	15	8	10	8	10	4	15	12	12	12	15	4	15	12	12	12	6	15	12	12	8	12	12	6	165	140	305
2	La Salle	4	10	6	12	4	10	15	10	8	10	12	15	6	10	12	15	12	10	8	10	8	4	10	15	4	4	4	4	113	139	252
3	FEU **(H)**	10	12	12	6	12	12	—	—	15	15	—	—	15	15	4	10	6	15	—	—	—	—	15	10	12	15	8	10	109	120	229
4	Ateneo	15	4	10	10	2	6	12	12	1	12	8	10	2	8	10	1	10	6	15	8	4	6	8	6	10	8	6	12	113	109	222
5	UP	1	6	8	4	10	2	8	15	6	8	10	8	10	6	8	6	8	8	10	15	10	10	4	8	6	6	10	8	109	110	219
6	UE	12	1	4	2	6	1	6	6	12	2	6	—	8	8	6	12	4	4	6	6	—	8	6	—	15	10	15	15	106	75	181
7	Adamson	6	15	1	8	8	15	—	—	4	—	—	—	—	—	1	8	—	—	4	4	15	12	—	—	—	—	—	—	39	62	101
8	NU	2	2	2	1	1	4	—	—	2	6	—	—	4	2	2	2	—	—	—	—	12	—	—	—	—	—	—	—	25	17	42

(H) Season host; = Champion; = Runner-up; = Third place; — = No team.
Notes: Results are final.

==== Juniors' division ====
		Basketball	Volleyball (indoor)		Swimming		Chess	Table tennis	Taekwondo	Judo	Football	Athletics	Fencing	Total				
Rank	Team	B	B	G	B	G	C	B	B	B	B	B	B	B	G	C	K	Overall
1	UST	10	12	15	12	15	4	12	15	10	8	10	10	99	30	4	0	133
2	Ateneo	15	10	—	15	—	6	6	10	15	15	12	15	113	0	6	0	119
3	UE	6	15	12	8	12	10	15	—	12	—	4	12	72	24	10	0	106
4	DLSZ	12	4	10	10	8	2	2	—	8	10	6	—	52	18	2	0	72
5	UPIS	1	6	8	6	10	1	4	—	4	—	15	8	44	18	1	0	63
6	FEU–FERN **(H)**	8	—	—	—	—	12	1	12	—	12	2	—	35	0	12	0	47
7	Adamson	4	—	—	—	—	15	8	—	—	—	8	—	20	0	15	0	35
8	NU	2	8	—	—	—	8	10	—	—	—	—	—	20	0	8	0	28

(H) Season host; = Champion; = Runner-up; = Third place; — = No team.
Notes: Results are final.

== Individual awards ==
- Athlete of the Year:
  - Seniors: Marlon Avenido (UST Growling Tigers)
  - Juniors: Gian Daniel Berino (UST Tiger Cubs)

== See also ==
- NCAA Season 85
