= 2013–14 PBA Philippine Cup finals =

Basketball cup finals

2013–2014 PBA Philippine Cup finals
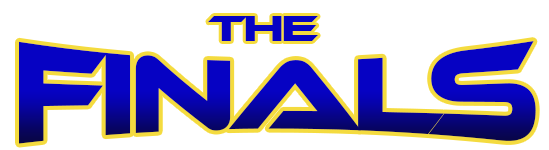
Team	Coach	Wins
(5) San Mig Super Coffee	Tim Cone	4
(2) Rain or Shine	Yeng Guiao	2
- Dates: February 14–26, 2014
- MVP: Mark Barroca (San Mig Super Coffee Mixers)
- Television: Sports5; TV5 and AksyonTV (local); Fox Sports Asia and AksyonTV International (international)
- Announcers: See broadcast notes
- Radio network: DZSR

Referees
- Game 1: A. Herrera, P. Balao, R. Gruta
- Game 2: A. Herrera, P. Balao, E. Tankion
- Game 3: N. Quilingen, P. Balao, D. Dacanay
- Game 4: A. Herrera, E. Aquino, D. Dacanay
- Game 5: A. Herrera, P. Balao, D. Dacanay
- Game 6: E. Aquino, D. Dacanay, E. Tankion

PBA Philippine Cup finals chronology
- < 2012–13 2014–15 >

PBA finals chronology
- < 2013 Governors' 2014 Commissioner's >

The 2013–14 Philippine Basketball Association (PBA) Philippine Cup finals was the best-of-7 championship series of the 2013–14 PBA Philippine Cup, and the conclusion of the conference's playoffs. The Rain or Shine Elasto Painters and the San Mig Super Coffee Mixers competed for the 36th All-Filipino championship and the 110th overall championship contested by the league.

The Mixers won the championship in six games.

== Background ==
=== Road to the finals ===
San Mig Super Coffee		Rain or Shine
Finished 7–7 (0.500): 5th place	Elimination round	Finished 11–3 (0.786): tied with Barangay Ginebra at 1st place
Finished 7–7 (0.500): 5th place	Tiebreaker*	0.866 (2nd place)
Def. Talk 'N Text, 2–1 (best-of-three)	Quarterfinals	Def. GlobalPort, 106–96 (twice-to-beat advantage)
Def. Barangay Ginebra, 4–3	Semifinals	Def. Petron Blaze, 4–1

=== Head-to-head matchup ===
December 6, 2013

recap

Rain or Shine Elasto Painters 86, San Mig Super Coffee Mixers 83

Smart Araneta Coliseum, Quezon City

December 29, 2013

recap

Rain or Shine Elasto Painters 101, San Mig Super Coffee Mixers 77

Mall of Asia Arena, Pasay

== Series summary ==
Team	Game 1	Game 2	Game 3	Game 4	Game 5	Game 6	Wins
San Mig Super Coffee	80	80	77	93	74	93	4
Rain or Shine	83	70	76	90	81	87	2
Venue	Araneta	Araneta	Araneta	Araneta	Araneta	Araneta

=== Game 1 ===
Sports5

February 14
8:00 p.m.

boxscore

San Mig Super Coffee Mixers 80, Rain or Shine Elasto Painters 83
Scoring by quarter: 15–20, 22–17, 22–23, 21–23
Pts: Devance 17; Rebs: Pingris 12; Asts: Pingris 6	Pts: Belga, Cruz 15; Rebs: Cruz, Rodriguez 7 Asts: Belga, Chan 4
Rain or Shine leads series, 1–0

Smart Araneta Coliseum, Quezon City
Attendance: 9,791
Referees: A. Herrera, P. Balao, R. Gruta

In the last two minutes of the game, the Elasto Painters took the lead 78–76 through a back-to-back three point shots by Jeff Chan. Tim Cone then re-inserted his starters and James Yap come up with two consecutive jumpers to gain back the lead, 80–78 with 34.7 seconds left. Jeff Chan missed a three-point attempt in the next play but Jervy Cruz got the rebound and made a hook shot to tie the game, 80-all with 22.5 seconds remaining. After the Mixers' timeout, they let the time go by until it reaches 8.7 seconds and called another timeout to draw up the possible game-winning basket, anchoring the play either to James Yap or Mark Barroca. Yap was not able to get the ball and Barroca missed his attempt while driving to the basket. In the next play, Yeng Guiao designed a play to make Jeff Chan a decoy to enable other players to be open. In-bounding the ball is Gabe Norwood who saw Paul Lee freed up with his defender, passed the ball to him to make the layup and to gain the lead, 82–80. Tim Cone called for a timeout he didn't have, resulting for a technical foul and a free throw made by Lee. The Mixers were forced to inbound the ball at the other end of the basket with .9 seconds left and failed to make the desperation shot.

=== Game 2 ===
Sports5

February 16
4:30 p.m.

boxscore

San Mig Super Coffee Mixers 80, Rain or Shine Elasto Painters 70
Scoring by quarter: 20–13, 17–11, 21–24, 22–22
Pts: Simon 15; Rebs: Pingris 12; Asts: Devance, Pingris 4	Pts: Chan 18; Rebs: Belga 9 Asts: Chan, Belga, Ibañes 2
Series tied, 1–1

Smart Araneta Coliseum, Quezon City
Attendance: 12,563
Referees: A. Herrera, P. Balao, E. Tankion

=== Game 3 ===
Sports5

February 19
8:00 p.m.

boxscore

San Mig Super Coffee Mixers 77, Rain or Shine Elasto Painters 76
Scoring by quarter: 19–20, 19–19, 25–25, 14–12
Pts: Simon 14; Rebs: Reavis 11; Asts: Pingris 5	Pts: Lee 23; Rebs: Almazan 10; Asts: Lee, Tiu 3
San Mig Super Coffee leads series, 2–1

Smart Araneta Coliseum, Quezon City
Attendance: 9,816
Referees: N. Quilingen, P. Balao, D. Dacanay

=== Game 4 ===
Sports5

February 21
8:00 p.m.

boxscore

San Mig Super Coffee Mixers 93, Rain or Shine Elasto Painters 90
Scoring by quarter: 26–27, 26–15, 18–34, 23–14
Pts: Barroca, Sangalang, Yap 17; Rebs: Sangalang 8 Asts: Barroca 8	Pts: Lee 28; Rebs: Belga 7 Asts: Norwood 4
San Mig Super Coffee leads series, 3–1

Smart Araneta Coliseum, Quezon City
Attendance: 11,315
Referees: A. Herrera, E. Aquino, D. Dacanay

=== Game 5 ===
Sports5

February 23
4:30 p.m.

boxscore

San Mig Super Coffee Mixers 74, Rain or Shine Elasto Painters 81
Scoring by quarter: 20–14, 23–21, 11–24, 20–22
Pts: Pingris, Yap 18; Rebs: Pingris 15; Asts: Chan 4	Pts: Chan 24; Rebs: Quiñahan 11; Asts: Devance, Simon 4
San Mig Super Coffee leads series, 3–2

Smart Araneta Coliseum, Quezon City
Attendance: 20,512
Referees: A. Herrera, P. Balao, D. Dacanay

=== Game 6 ===
Sports5

February 26
8:00 p.m.

boxscore

San Mig Super Coffee Mixers 93, Rain or Shine Elasto Painters 87
Scoring by quarter: 30–17, 19–26, 17–24, 27–20
Pts: Barroca 22; Rebs: Pingris 11; Asts: Barroca 2	Pts: Lee 15; Rebs: Cruz 9 Asts: Chan, Norwood 4
San Mig Super Coffee wins series, 4–2

Smart Araneta Coliseum, Quezon City
Attendance: 20,337
Referees: E. Aquino, J. Mariano, D. Dacanay

== Rosters ==
San Mig Super Coffee Mixers roster
Players
Coaches

Pos.	#	POB	Name	Height	Weight	DOB (YYYY–MM–DD)	From
G	2	(United States)	Justin Melton (R)	5 ft 10 in (1.78 m)	163 lb (74 kg)		Mount Olive
C	4	(United States)	Rafi Reavis	6 ft 8 in (2.03 m)	205 lb (93 kg)		Coppin State
C	5	(United States)	Isaac Holstein (injured) (R)	6 ft 8 in (2.03 m)	206 lb (93 kg)		West Virginia State
SF	6	(Philippines)	JR Cawaling (R)	6 ft 1.75 in (1.87 m)	190 lb (86 kg)		Far Eastern
SG	8	(Philippines)	Peter June Simon	6 ft 1 in (1.85 m)	180 lb (82 kg)		Mindanao
PG	9	(Philippines)	Lester Alvarez (IN)	5 ft 8 in (1.73 m)	154 lb (70 kg)		Adamson
F/C	10	(Philippines)	Ian Sangalang (R)	6 ft 6 in (1.98 m)	212 lb (96 kg)		San Sebastian
SG	11	(United States)	Alex Mallari	6 ft 4 in (1.93 m)	167 lb (76 kg)		Lewis–Clark State
PG	14	(Philippines)	Mark Barroca	5 ft 10 in (1.78 m)	170 lb (77 kg)		Far Eastern
PF	15	(Philippines)	Marc Pingris	6 ft 5 in (1.96 m)	210 lb (95 kg)		PSBA
SG	18	(Philippines)	James Yap	6 ft 3 in (1.91 m)	205 lb (93 kg)		UE
SF	19	(Philippines)	Jerwin Gaco	6 ft 4 in (1.93 m)	180 lb (82 kg)		De La Salle
G/F	22	(Philippines)	Allein Maliksi (injured)	6 ft 3 in (1.91 m)	180 lb (82 kg)		UST
SF	33	(Philippines)	Val Acuña	6 ft 4 in (1.93 m)	179 lb (81 kg)		UE
PF	38	(United States)	Joe Devance	6 ft 7 in (2.01 m)	215 lb (98 kg)		UTEP
C	95	(Philippines)	Yancy De Ocampo	6 ft 9 in (2.06 m)	220 lb (100 kg)		Saint Francis of Assisi

Head coach

- (United States) Tim Cone (George Washington)

Assistant coach(es)

- (United States) Jeffrey Cariaso (Sonoma State)
- (Philippines) Richard del Rosario (De La Salle)
- (Philippines) Olsen Racela (Ateneo)
- (Philippines) Johnny Abarrientos (Far Eastern)

Team manager

- (Philippines) Alvin Patrimonio (Mapúa)

Legend

- (C) Team captain
- (CI) Commissioner's Cup Import
- (GI) Governors' Cup Import
- (EI) EASL Import
- (DP) Unsigned draft pick
- (FA) Free agent
- (IN) Inactive
- (S) Suspended
- (R) Rookie
- Injured

Roster

Rain or Shine Elasto Painters roster
Players
Coaches

Pos.	#	POB	Name	Height	Weight	DOB (YYYY–MM–DD)	From
SG	1	(United States)	Jonathan Uyloan (IN)	6 ft 0 in (1.83 m)	185 lb (84 kg)		Golden West
PG	3	(Philippines)	Paul Lee	6 ft 0 in (1.83 m)	200 lb (91 kg)		UE
SG	5	(United States)	Gabe Norwood	6 ft 5 in (1.96 m)	210 lb (95 kg)		George Mason
SF	6	(Philippines)	Jireh Ibañes (C)	6 ft 1 in (1.85 m)	182 lb (83 kg)		UP Diliman
G	8	(Philippines)	Jeric Teng (R)	6 ft 2 in (1.88 m)	182 lb (83 kg)		UST
G	9	(Philippines)	Alex Nuyles (R)	6 ft 1 in (1.85 m)	199 lb (90 kg)		Adamson
PG	11	(Philippines)	Tyrone Tang	5 ft 7 in (1.70 m)	155 lb (70 kg)		De La Salle
SG	16	(Philippines)	Jeffrei Chan	6 ft 3 in (1.91 m)	170 lb (77 kg)		Far Eastern
PG	17	(Philippines)	Chris Tiu	5 ft 11 in (1.80 m)	175 lb (79 kg)		Ateneo
SG	18	(Philippines)	Ryan Araña	6 ft 1.25 in (1.86 m)	180 lb (82 kg)		De La Salle
C	20	(Philippines)	Jervy Cruz	6 ft 5 in (1.96 m)	220 lb (100 kg)		UST
C	30	(Philippines)	Beau Belga	6 ft 5 in (1.96 m)	285 lb (129 kg)		Philippine Christian
SF	33	(Philippines)	Ronnie Matias	6 ft 4 in (1.93 m)	184 lb (83 kg)		Manila
PF	48	(Philippines)	J.R. Quiñahan	6 ft 6 in (1.98 m)	225 lb (102 kg)		Visayas
PF	55	(Philippines)	Larry Rodriguez	6 ft 5 in (1.96 m)	200 lb (91 kg)		PMI
C	57	(Philippines)	Raymond Almazan (R)	6 ft 8 in (2.03 m)	200 lb (91 kg)		Letran

Head coach

- (Philippines) Yeng Guiao (UP Diliman)

Assistant coach(es)

- (Philippines) Caloy Garcia (St. Benilde)
- (Philippines) Mike Buendia
- (Philippines) Jay Legacion
- (Philippines) Matthew Makalintal
- (Philippines) Ricky Umayam
- (Philippines) Henry Salomon

Legend

- (C) Team captain
- (CI) Commissioner's Cup Import
- (GI) Governors' Cup Import
- (EI) EASL Import
- (DP) Unsigned draft pick
- (FA) Free agent
- (IN) Inactive
- (S) Suspended
- (R) Rookie
- Injured

Roster

== Broadcast notes ==
Game	TV5 coverage			Fox Sports coverage	
Game	Play-by-play	Analyst(s)	Courtside reporters	Play-by-play	Analyst(s)
Game 1	Mico Halili	Quinito Henson	Erika Padilla	Nikko Ramos	Charles Tiu
Game 2	Charlie Cuna	Dominic Uy	Rizza Diaz	Nikko Ramos	Vince Hizon
Game 3	Magoo Marjon	Eric Reyes	Erika Padilla		
Game 4	Mico Halili	Jason Webb	Rizza Diaz	Patricia Bermudez-Hizon	Ronnie Magsanoc
Game 5	Magoo Marjon	Jason Webb	Rizza Diaz	Nikko Ramos	Vince Hizon
Game 6	Mico Halili	Quinito Henson	Erika Padilla	Jude Turcuato	Jason Webb

- Additional Game 6 crew:
  - Trophy presentation: Dominic Uy
  - Dugout interviewer: Erika Padilla
