= 2012 PBA Governors' Cup finals =

Basketball tournament

Team	Coach	Wins
(1) Rain or Shine Elasto Painters	Yeng Guiao	4
(2) B-Meg Llamados	Tim Cone	3
- Dates: July 22 – August 5, 2012
- MVP: Jeffrei Chan (Rain or Shine Elasto Painters)
- Television: AKTV on IBC
- Announcers: See broadcast notes
- Radio network: DZRJ-AM

Referees
- Game 1: N. Quilinguen, N. Guevarra, R. Maurillo
- Game 2: N. Quilinguen, E. Aquino, S. Pineda
- Game 3: S. Pineda, E. Aquino, R. Yante
- Game 4: N. Quilinguen, S. Pineda, R. Yante
- Game 5: R. Maurillo, E. Aquino, J. Marabe
- Game 6: S. Pineda, J. Marabe, R. Yante
- Game 7: N. Quilinguen, J. Mariano, R. Yante

PBA Governors' Cup finals chronology
- < 2011 2013 >

PBA finals chronology
- < 2012 Commissioner's 2012–13 Philippine >

The 2012 Philippine Basketball Association (PBA) Governors' Cup finals was the best-of-7 championship series of the 2012 PBA Governors' Cup, and the conclusion of the conference's playoffs. The Rain or Shine Elasto Painters and the B-Meg Llamados competed for the 106th championship contested by the league.

Rain or Shine won the series, four games to three, capturing their first championship in their franchise history. The Elasto Painters also prevented a possible series comeback from B-Meg after the Llamados won games 5 and 6 coming from a 1–3 deficit, in which last time to do so was during the 1991 First Conference finals when Ginebra San Miguel won against Shell Rimula X from a 1–3 deficit.

== Background ==
=== Road to the finals ===
Rain or Shine		B-Meg
Finished 8–1 (0.889)	Elimination round	Finished 6–3 (0.667)
Finished 10–4 (0.692)	Semifinals	Finished 9–5 (0.625)—Tied for 2nd*
Bye	playoff	Def. Barangay Ginebra, 74–72

=== Head-to-head matchup ===
May 25, 2012

recap

Rain or Shine Elasto Painters 100, B-Meg Llamados 94 (OT)

Smart Araneta Coliseum, Quezon City

July 18, 2012

recap

Rain or Shine Elasto Painters 92, B-Meg Llamados 82

Smart Araneta Coliseum, Quezon City

== Series summary ==
Team	Game 1	Game 2	Game 3	Game 4	Game 5	Game 6	Game 7	Wins
Rain or Shine	91	80	93	94	81	81	83	4
B-Meg	80	85	84	89	91	97	76	3
Venue	Araneta	Araneta	Araneta	Araneta	Araneta	Araneta	Araneta

=== Game 1 ===
AKTV on IBC

July 22
6:00 p.m.

Report

Rain or Shine Elasto Painters 91, B-Meg Llamados 80
Scoring by quarter: 18–16, 17–23, 31–20, 25–21
Pts: Cornley 25; Rebs: Cornley 11; Asts: Cornley, Norwood 4	Pts: Yap 19; Rebs: Pingris 14; Asts: Pingris 4
Rain or Shine leads series, 1–0

Smart Araneta Coliseum, Quezon City
Referees: N. Quilinguen, N. Guevarra, R. Maurillo

=== Game 2 ===
AKTV on IBC

July 25
7:00 p.m.

Report

Rain or Shine Elasto Painters 80, B-Meg Llamados 85
Scoring by quarter: 26–21, 15–23, 19–21, 20–20
Pts: Cornley 18; Rebs: Cornley 14; Asts: Lee 7	Pts: Blakely 26; Rebs: Blakely 16; Asts: Simon, Urbiztondo 3
Series tied, 1–1

Smart Araneta Coliseum, Quezon City
Referees: N. Quilinguen, E. Aquino, S. Pineda

=== Game 3 ===
AKTV on IBC

July 27
7:00 p.m.

Report

Rain or Shine Elasto Painters 93, B-Meg Llamados 84
Scoring by quarter: 19–23, 21–15, 30–14, 23–32
Pts: Cornley 26; Rebs: Cornley 15; Asts: Cornley 5	Pts: Villanueva 18; Rebs: Blakely, Pingris 10; Asts: Blakely 7
Rain or Shine leads series, 2–1

Smart Araneta Coliseum, Quezon City
Referees: S. Pineda, E. Aquino, R. Yante.

=== Game 4 ===
AKTV on IBC

July 29
6:00 p.m.

Report

Rain or Shine Elasto Painters 94, B-Meg Llamados 89
Scoring by quarter: 17–30, 30–15, 27–27, 20–17
Pts: Cornley 23; Rebs: Cornley 14; Asts: Chan 6	Pts: Yap 25; Rebs: Blakely 23; Asts: Blakely, Urbiztondo, Villanueva 3
Rain or Shine leads series, 3–1

Smart Araneta Coliseum, Quezon City
Attendance: 13,702
Referees: N. Quilinguen, S. Pineda, R. Yante

=== Game 5 ===
AKTV on IBC

August 1
7:00 p.m.

Report

Rain or Shine Elasto Painters 81, B-Meg Llamados 91
Scoring by quarter: 18–19, 23–25, 20–26, 20–21
Pts: Cornley 25; Rebs: Cornley 14; Asts: Cornley 5	Pts: Yap 30; Rebs: de Ocampo 14; Asts: Blakely 5
Rain or Shine leads series, 3–2

Smart Araneta Coliseum, Quezon City
Attendance: 12,135
Referees: R. Maurillo, E. Aquino, J. Marabe

=== Game 6 ===
AKTV on IBC

August 3
7:00 p.m.

Report

Rain or Shine Elasto Painters 81, B-Meg Llamados 97
Scoring by quarter: 13–19, 17–23, 26–23, 25–32
Pts: Cornley 14; Rebs: Cornley 11; Asts: Norwood 6	Pts: Yap 20; Rebs: Blakely 15; Asts: Barroca, Pingris, Yap 2
Series tied, 3–3

Smart Araneta Coliseum, Quezon City
Attendance: 13,300
Referees: S. Pineda, J. Marabe, R. Yante

=== Game 7 ===
AKTV on IBC

August 5
6:00 p.m.

report

Rain or Shine Elasto Painters 83, B-Meg Llamados 76
Scoring by quarter: 35–22, 15–26, 18–16, 15–12
Pts: Cornley 20; Rebs: Cornley 14; Asts: Chan 3	Pts: Yap 23; Rebs: Blakely 16; Asts: Urbiztondo, Yap 2
Rain or Shine wins series, 4–3

Smart Araneta Coliseum, Quezon City
Attendance: 21,583
Referees: N. Quilinguen, J. Mariano, R. Yante

== Rosters ==
Rain or Shine Elasto Painters roster
Players
Coaches

Pos.	#	POB	Name	Height	Weight	DOB (YYYY–MM–DD)	From
G	1	(Philippines)	Jonathan Uyloan	6 ft 0 in (1.83 m)	185 lb (84 kg)		Golden West
G/F	2	(United States)	Jamelle Cornley (I)	6 ft 5 in (1.96 m)	240 lb (109 kg)		Penn State
G	3	(Philippines)	Paul Lee (injured) (R)	6 ft 0 in (1.83 m)	200 lb (91 kg)		UE
PF	5	(Philippines)	Larry Rodriguez	6 ft 4 in (1.93 m)	200 lb (91 kg)		PMI
SF	6	(Philippines)	Jireh Ibañes	6 ft 1 in (1.85 m)	182 lb (83 kg)		UP Diliman
PF	10	(United States)	Gabe Norwood	6 ft 5 in (1.96 m)	210 lb (95 kg)		George Mason
PG	11	(Philippines)	Tyrone Tang	5 ft 7 in (1.70 m)	155 lb (70 kg)		De La Salle
G/F	16	(Philippines)	Jeffrei Chan	6 ft 3 in (1.91 m)	170 lb (77 kg)		Far Eastern
SG	18	(Philippines)	Ryan Araña	6 ft 1.25 in (1.86 m)	180 lb (82 kg)		De La Salle
F/C	20	(Philippines)	Jervy Cruz	6 ft 5 in (1.96 m)	220 lb (100 kg)		UST
G/F	21	(Philippines)	Chito Jaime	6 ft 4 in (1.93 m)	200 lb (91 kg)		AMA
G	23	(Philippines)	Ronjay Buenafe	6 ft 0.5 in (1.84 m)	200 lb (91 kg)		Emilio Aguinaldo
C	30	(Philippines)	Beau Belga	6 ft 6 in (1.98 m)	285 lb (129 kg)		Philippine Christian
SF	33	(Philippines)	Ronnie Matias	6 ft 4 in (1.93 m)	184 lb (83 kg)		Manila
F/C	48	(Philippines)	J.R. Quiñahan	6 ft 6 in (1.98 m)	275 lb (125 kg)		Visayas

Head coach

- (Philippines) Yeng Guiao (UP Diliman)

Assistant coach(es)

- (Philippines) Caloy Garcia (St. Benilde)
- (Philippines) Rhoel Nadurata
- (Philippines) Mike Buendia
- (Philippines) Jay Legacion
- (Philippines) Matthew Makalintal

Legend

- (C) Team captain
- (CI) Commissioner's Cup Import
- (GI) Governors' Cup Import
- (EI) EASL Import
- (DP) Unsigned draft pick
- (FA) Free agent
- (IN) Inactive
- (S) Suspended
- (R) Rookie
- Injured

B-Meg Llamados roster
Players
Coaches

Pos.	#	POB	Name	Height	Weight	DOB (YYYY–MM–DD)	From
PG	2	(United States)	Urbiztondo, Joshua	6 ft 1 in (1.85 m)	185 lb (84 kg)		Fresno Pacific
G	3	(Philippines)	Jonas Villanueva	5 ft 11 in (1.80 m)	170 lb (77 kg)		Far Eastern
C	4	(United States)	Rafi Reavis	6 ft 8 in (2.03 m)	205 lb (93 kg)		Coppin State
G/F	6	(Philippines)	Val Acuña	6 ft 4 in (1.93 m)	179 lb (81 kg)		UE
SF	7	(Philippines)	JC Intal	6 ft 4 in (1.93 m)	195 lb (88 kg)		Ateneo
G	8	(Philippines)	Peter June Simon	6 ft 1 in (1.85 m)	180 lb (82 kg)		Mindanao
PG	14	(Philippines)	Mark Barroca (R)	5 ft 10 in (1.78 m)	170 lb (77 kg)		Far Eastern
F	15	(Philippines)	Marc Pingris	6 ft 6 in (1.98 m)	210 lb (95 kg)		PSBA
G/F	18	(Philippines)	James Yap (C)	6 ft 3 in (1.91 m)	205 lb (93 kg)		UE
PF	19	(Philippines)	Jerwin Gaco	6 ft 4 in (1.93 m)	180 lb (82 kg)		De La Salle
F	23	(United States)	Marqus Blakely (I)	6 ft 5 in (1.96 m)	220 lb (100 kg)		Vermont
F	25	(Philippines)	Ken Bono	6 ft 4 in (1.93 m)	220 lb (100 kg)		Adamson
F	38	(United States)	Joe Devance	6 ft 7 in (2.01 m)	215 lb (98 kg)		UTEP
PF	63	(Switzerland)	Mike Burtscher	6 ft 6 in (1.98 m)	210 lb (95 kg)		Clearwater Christian
F/C	95	(Philippines)	Yancy De Ocampo	6 ft 9 in (2.06 m)	220 lb (100 kg)		Saint Francis of Assisi

Head coach

- (United States) Tim Cone (George Washington)

Assistant coach(es)

- (Philippines) Richard del Rosario (De La Salle)
- (Philippines) Koy Banal (Mapúa)
- (Philippines) Johnny Abarrientos (Far Eastern)
- (United States) Jeffrey Cariaso (Sonoma State)
- (Philippines) Dayong Mendoza

Legend

- (C) Team captain
- (CI) Commissioner's Cup Import
- (GI) Governors' Cup Import
- (EI) EASL Import
- (DP) Unsigned draft pick
- (FA) Free agent
- (IN) Inactive
- (S) Suspended
- (R) Rookie
- Injured

== Broadcast notes ==
Game	Play-by-play	Analyst(s)	Courtside reporters	AKTV Center Analysts
Game 1	Mico Halili	Quinito Henson	Erika Padilla and Sel Guevara	Rado Dimalibot, Jason Webb, Jojo Lastimosa, Gary David and Ryan Gregorio
Game 2	Magoo Marjon	Jason Webb	Erika Padilla and Sel Guevara	Mico Halili, Jojo Lastimosa, Ogie Menor and Franz Pumaren
Game 3	Magoo Marjon	Jojo Lastimosa	Erika Padilla and Sel Guevara	Mico Halili, Jason Webb, Aaron Atayde and Alex Crisano
Game 4	Magoo Marjon	Ryan Gregorio	Erika Padilla and Sel Guevara	Mico Halili and Jason Webb
Game 5	Mico Halili	Jojo Lastimosa	Erika Padilla and Sel Guevara	Magoo Marjon and Jason Webb
Game 6	Magoo Marjon	Jason Webb	Jessica Mendoza and Sel Guevara	Mico Halili and Jojo Lastimosa
Game 7	Mico Halili	Jason Webb	Jessica Mendoza and Sel Guevara	Magoo Marjon, Jojo Lastimosa and Benjie Paras

- Additional Game 7 crew:
  - Trophy presentation: Aaron Atayde
  - Dugout celebration interviewer: Erika Padilla
