= 2014–15 Rain or Shine Elasto Painters season =

- Head coach: Yeng Guiao
- Owner(s): Asian Coatings Philippines, Inc.

Philippine Cup results
- Record: 9–2 (81.8%)
- Place: 2nd
- Playoff finish: Semifinalist (lost to Alaska, 2–4)

Commissioner's Cup results
- Record: 8–3 (72.7%)
- Place: 1st
- Playoff finish: Runner-up vs Talk 'N Text 3–4

Governors' Cup results
- Record: 7–4 (63.6%)
- Place: 3rd
- Playoff finish: Semifinalist (lost to San Miguel, 1–3)

Rain or Shine Elasto Painters seasons

The 2014–15 Rain or Shine Elasto Painters season was the 9th season of the franchise in the Philippine Basketball Association (PBA).

== Key dates ==
- August 24: The 2014 PBA draft took place in Midtown Atrium, Robinson Place Manila.

== Draft picks ==
Round	Pick	Player	Position	Nationality	PBA D-League team	College
1	2	Kevin Alas	G	Philippines	NLEX (D-League)	Letran
1	9	Jericho Cruz	G	Philippines	Zambales M-Builders	AdU
2	2	Kevin Espinosa	F/G	Philippines	none	MIT
2	9	Mike Gamboa	G	Philippines	Junior Powerade Tigers	UP

== Roster ==
2014–15 Rain or Shine Elasto Painters roster
Players
Coaches

Pos.	#	POB	Name	Height	Weight	DOB (YYYY–MM–DD)	From
G	1	(Philippines)	Jonathan Uyloan	6 ft 0 in (1.83 m)	185 lb (84 kg)	1983-11-26	Golden West
G	3	(Philippines)	Paul Lee	6 ft 0 in (1.83 m)	200 lb (91 kg)	1989-02-04	UE
F	5	(United States)	Gabe Norwood	6 ft 6 in (1.98 m)	210 lb (95 kg)	1985-02-09	George Mason
F	6	(Philippines)	Jireh Ibañes (C)	6 ft 2 in (1.88 m)	182 lb (83 kg)	1982-04-20	Philippines
G	8	(Philippines)	Jeric Teng	6 ft 2 in (1.88 m)	182 lb (83 kg)	1991-03-18	UST
G	9	(Philippines)	Jericho Cruz (R)	6 ft 1 in (1.85 m)	190 lb (86 kg)	1990-10-11	Adamson
G	11	(Philippines)	Tyrone Tang	5 ft 7 in (1.70 m)	155 lb (70 kg)	1984-09-25	De La Salle
G/F	16	(Philippines)	Jeffrei Chan	6 ft 2 in (1.88 m)	185 lb (84 kg)	1983-02-11	Far Eastern
G	17	(Philippines)	Chris Tiu	5 ft 11 in (1.80 m)	170 lb (77 kg)	1985-07-15	Ateneo
G	18	(Philippines)	Ryan Araña	6 ft 2 in (1.88 m)	180 lb (82 kg)	1983-03-23	De La Salle
F	20	(Philippines)	Jervy Cruz (injured)	6 ft 4 in (1.93 m)	250 lb (113 kg)	1986-09-09	UST
F/C	30	(Philippines)	Beau Belga (injured)	6 ft 5 in (1.96 m)	295 lb (134 kg)	1986-11-30	Philippine Christian
F/C	48	(Philippines)	JR Quiñahan	6 ft 6 in (1.98 m)	295 lb (134 kg)	1984-05-08	Visayas
C	57	(Philippines)	Raymond Almazan	6 ft 8 in (2.03 m)	194 lb (88 kg)	1989-08-02	Letran

Head coach

- (Philippines) Yeng Guiao (UP Diliman)

Assistant coach(es)

- (Philippines) Caloy Garcia (St. Benilde)
- (Philippines) Mike Buendia
- (Philippines) Jay Legacion
- (Philippines) Matthew Makalintal
- (Philippines) Ricky Umayam

Team manager

- (Philippines) Mamerto Mondragon^{[a]}
- (Philippines) Boy Lapid (assistant)

Legend

- (C) Team captain
- (CI) Commissioner's Cup Import
- (GI) Governors' Cup Import
- (EI) EASL Import
- (DP) Unsigned draft pick
- (FA) Free agent
- (IN) Inactive
- (S) Suspended
- (R) Rookie
- Injured

- ^{a} also serves as Rain or Shine's board governor.

== Philippine Cup ==
=== Eliminations ===
==== Standings ====
Pos	Team	W	L	PCT	GB	Qualification
1	San Miguel Beermen	9	2	.818 (Note: Head-to-head record: San Miguel 1–0 Rain or Shine)	—	Advance to semifinals
2	Rain or Shine Elasto Painters	9	2	.818	—	Advance to semifinals
3	Alaska Aces	8	3	.727 (Note: Head-to-head record: Alaska 1–0 Talk 'N Text)	1	Twice-to-beat in the quarterfinals
4	Talk 'N Text Tropang Texters	8	3	.727	1	Twice-to-beat in the quarterfinals
5	Barangay Ginebra San Miguel	6	5	.545 (Note: Head-to-head quotient: Barangay Ginebra 1.07, Meralco 1.06, Purefoods Star 0.89)	3	Twice-to-beat in the quarterfinals
6	Meralco Bolts	6	5	.545	3	Twice-to-beat in the quarterfinals
7	Purefoods Star Hotshots	6	5	.545	3	Twice-to-win in the quarterfinals
8	GlobalPort Batang Pier	5	6	.455	4	Twice-to-win in the quarterfinals
9	Barako Bull Energy	4	7	.364 (Note: Head-to-head record: Barako Bull 1–0 NLEX)	5	Twice-to-win in the quarterfinals
10	NLEX Road Warriors	4	7	.364	5	Twice-to-win in the quarterfinals
11	Kia Sorento	1	10	.091	8	
12	Blackwater Elite	0	11	.000	9	

Source: PBA.ph

=== Playoffs ===
==== Bracket ====
Quarterfinals (1st phase)
(#3 twice to beat)
3	Alaska	82
10	NLEX	78
(#6 twice to beat)
6	Meralco	77
7	Purefoods Star	65
(#4 twice to beat)
4	Talk 'N Text	105
9	Barako Bull	76
(#5 twice to beat)
5	Barangay Ginebra	95
8	GlobalPort	78

Quarterfinals (2nd phase) (single elimination)
3	Alaska	87
6	Meralco	69
4	Talk N Text	83
5	Barangay Ginebra	67

Semifinals (best-of-7)
2	Rain or Shine	2
3	Alaska	4
1	San Miguel	4
4	Talk N' Text	0

Finals (best-of-7)
3	Alaska	3
1	San Miguel	4

== Commissioner's Cup ==
=== Eliminations ===
==== Standings ====
Pos	Team	W	L	PCT	GB	Qualification
1	Rain or Shine Elasto Painters	8	3	.727 (Note: Head-to-head quotient: Rain or Shine 1.025, Talk 'N Text 1.010, Purefoods 0.969)	—	Twice-to-beat in the quarterfinals
2	Talk 'N Text Tropang Texters	8	3	.727	—	Twice-to-beat in the quarterfinals
3	Purefoods Star Hotshots	8	3	.727	—	Best-of-three quarterfinals
4	NLEX Road Warriors	6	5	.545 (Note: Head-to-head record: NLEX 1–0 Meralco)	2	Best-of-three quarterfinals
5	Meralco Bolts	6	5	.545	2	Best-of-three quarterfinals
6	Alaska Aces	5	6	.455 (Note: Head-to-head quotient: Alaska 1.021, Barako Bull 1.019, Barangay Ginebra 0.960)	3	Best-of-three quarterfinals
7	Barako Bull Energy	5	6	.455	3	Twice-to-win in the quarterfinals
8	Barangay Ginebra San Miguel	5	6	.455	3	Twice-to-win in the quarterfinals
9	San Miguel Beermen	4	7	.364 (Note: Head-to-head quotient: San Miguel 1.011, GlobalPort 0.995, Kia 0.994)	4	
10	GlobalPort Batang Pier	4	7	.364	4	
11	Kia Carnival	4	7	.364	4	
12	Blackwater Elite	3	8	.273	5	

Source: PBA.ph

=== Playoffs ===
==== Bracket ====
Quarterfinals
(#1 twice-to-beat)
1	Rain or Shine	92
8	Barangay Ginebra	91
(best-of-3)
4	NLEX	0
5	Meralco	2
(#2 twice-to-beat)
2	Talk 'N Text	127
7	Barako Bull	97
(best-of-3)
3	Purefoods Star	2
6	Alaska	0

Semifinals (best-of-5)
1	Rain or Shine	3
5	Meralco	0
2	Talk 'N Text	3
3	Purefoods Star	1

Finals (best-of-7)
1	Rain or Shine	3
2	Talk 'N Text	4

== Governors' Cup ==
=== Eliminations ===
==== Standings ====
Pos	Team	W	L	PCT	GB	Qualification
1	Alaska Aces	8	3	.727 (Note: Head-to-head record: Alaska 1–0 San Miguel)	—	Twice-to-beat in the quarterfinals
2	San Miguel Beermen	8	3	.727	—	Twice-to-beat in the quarterfinals
3	Rain or Shine Elasto Painters	7	4	.636 (Note: Head-to-head record: Rain or Shine 1–0 GlobalPort)	1	Twice-to-beat in the quarterfinals
4	GlobalPort Batang Pier	7	4	.636	1	Twice-to-beat in the quarterfinals
5	Star Hotshots	6	5	.545 (Note: Head-to-head record: Barako Bull 1–0 Star)	2	Twice-to-win in the quarterfinals
6	Barako Bull Energy	6	5	.545	2	Twice-to-win in the quarterfinals
7	Meralco Bolts	5	6	.455 (Note: Head-to-head quotient: Meralco 1.13, Barangay Ginebra 1.00, Kia 0.95, Talk 'N Text 0.93)	3	Twice-to-win in the quarterfinals
8	Barangay Ginebra San Miguel	5	6	.455	3	Twice-to-win in the quarterfinals
9	Kia Carnival	5	6	.455	3	
10	Talk 'N Text Tropang Texters	5	6	.455	3	
11	NLEX Road Warriors	3	8	.273	5	
12	Blackwater Elite	1	10	.091	7	

Source: PBA.ph

==== Bracket ====
Quarterfinals
(#1 twice to beat)
1	Alaska	114
8	Ginebra	108
(#4 twice to beat)
4	GlobalPort	73	94
5	Star	126	101
(#2 twice to beat)
2	San Miguel	99	102
7	Meralco	106	86
(#3 twice to beat)
3	Rain or Shine	134**
6	Barako Bull	132

Semifinals (best-of-5)
1	Alaska	3
5	Star	0
2	San Miguel	3
3	Rain or Shine	1

Finals (best-of-7)
1	Alaska	0
2	San Miguel	4

*Game went into overtime^{[a]}

^{a} The number of asterisks denotes the number of overtime(s) occurred.

== Transactions ==
=== Trades ===
==== Pre-season ====
October 2, 2014	To Rain or Shine 2015 & 2019 2nd round picks	To Talk 'N Text Larry Rodriguez
October 4, 2014	To Rain or Shine 2015 1st round pick	To NLEX Kevin Alas

=== Recruited imports ===
Tournament	Name	Debuted	Last game	Record
Commissioner's Cup	Rick Jackson	January 28 (vs. Talk 'N Text)	February 14 (vs. Purefoods Star)	3–2
Commissioner's Cup	Wayne Chism	February 20 (vs. Alaska)	April 29 (vs. Talk 'N Text)	12–5
Governors' Cup	Wendell McKines	May 12 (vs. San Miguel)	July 8 (vs. San Miguel)	9–7
