= 2009–10 Air21 Express season =

- Head coach: Yeng Guiao

Philippine Cup results
- Record: 6–12 (33.3%)
- Place: 7th (tied)
- Playoff finish: Wildcards (by Coca Cola 118–112)

Fiesta Conference results
- Record: 4–14 (22.2%)
- Place: 9th
- Playoff finish: Wildcards (by Rain or Shine 92–89)

Air21 Express seasons

The 2009–10 Air21 Express season was the 8th season of the franchise in the Philippine Basketball Association (PBA). In the Philippine Cup, they were known as Burger King Whoppers.

== Key dates ==
- August 2: The 2009 PBA Draft took place in Fort Bonifacio, Taguig.

== Draft picks ==
Round	Pick	Player	Height	Position	Nationality	College
1	1	Japeth Aguilar	6'9"	Power forward/center	Philippines	Ateneo, Western Kentucky
1	4	Chris Ross	6'1"	Point guard	United States	Marshall
1	7	Rogemar Menor	6'2"	Shooting guard	Philippines	San Beda

== Roster ==
2009–10 Air21 Express roster
Players

Pos.	#	POB	Name	Height	Weight	DOB (YYYY–MM–DD)	From
F/C	2	(Philippines)	Billy Mamaril	6 ft 5 in (1.96 m)	210 lb (95 kg)		Bakersfield
G	3	(Philippines)	Egay Billones	5 ft 8 in (1.73 m)	165 lb (75 kg)		Centro Escolar Las Piñas
G	6	(Philippines)	Ronjay Buenafe	6 ft 1 in (1.85 m)	185 lb (84 kg)		Emilio Aguinaldo
F	8	(Philippines)	Erick Rodriguez	6 ft 4 in (1.93 m)	200 lb (91 kg)		Letran
F	10	(Japan)	Rich Alvarez	6 ft 4 in (1.93 m)	200 lb (91 kg)		Ateneo
G	14	(Philippines)	Renren Ritualo	6 ft 1 in (1.85 m)	185 lb (84 kg)		De La Salle
F	15	(Philippines)	Wesley Gonzales	6 ft 3 in (1.91 m)	180 lb (82 kg)		Ateneo
G	19	(Philippines)	Wynne Arboleda	5 ft 11 in (1.80 m)	180 lb (82 kg)		MLQU
F	20	(Philippines)	Leo Najorda	6 ft 4 in (1.93 m)	210 lb (95 kg)		San Sebastian
F	22	(Philippines)	Ronnie Matias	6 ft 4 in (1.93 m)	195 lb (88 kg)		Manila
F/C	30	(Philippines)	Beau Belga	6 ft 6 in (1.98 m)	225 lb (102 kg)		Philippine Christian
F/C	34	(Philippines)	Carlo Sharma	6 ft 7 in (2.01 m)	225 lb (102 kg)		De La Salle
G	35	(United States)	Ramsey Williams	6 ft 0 in (1.83 m)	175 lb (79 kg)		Hawaiʻi
F	44	(Philippines)	Doug Kramer	6 ft 4 in (1.93 m)	210 lb (95 kg)		Ateneo

Coaches
Head coach
- (Philippines) Yeng Guiao (UP Diliman)
Assistant(s)
- (Philippines) Roehl Nadurata (UE)
- (Philippines) Johnny Tam

Legend
- (DP) Unsigned draft pick
- (FA) Free agent
- (S) Suspended
- Injured

== Philippine Cup ==
=== Eliminations ===
==== Standings ====
Pos	Team	W	L	PCT	GB	Qualification
1	Alaska Aces	13	5	.722 (Note: Head-to-head record: Alaska 2–0 San Miguel)	—	Advance to semifinals
2	San Miguel Beermen	13	5	.722	—	Advance to semifinals
3	Purefoods Tender Juicy Giants	12	6	.667 (Note: Head-to-head record: Purefoods 1–1 Barangay Ginebra; Purefoods 0, Barangay Ginebra 0; overall point differential: Purefoods +85, Barangay Ginebra +75)	1	Advance to quarterfinals
4	Barangay Ginebra Kings	12	6	.667	1	Advance to quarterfinals
5	Talk 'N Text Tropang Texters	11	7	.611	2	Advance to quarterfinals
6	Sta. Lucia Realtors	10	8	.556	3	Advance to wildcard round
7	Coca-Cola Tigers	6	12	.333 (Note: Head-to-head record: Burger King 1–1, Coca-Cola; Burger King +10, Coca-Cola −10)	7	Advance to wildcard round
8	Burger King Whoppers	6	12	.333	7	Advance to wildcard round
9	Rain or Shine Elasto Painters	4	14	.222	9	Advance to wildcard round
10	Barako Bull Energy Boosters	3	15	.167	10	
—	Smart Gilas (G)	3	6	.333	5.5	Guest team (Note: Smart Gilas's results do not count in the standings.)

Source: PBA.ph
(G) Guests

==== Game log ====
===== Eliminations =====
2010 PBA Philippine Cup game log
October

Game	Date	Opponent	Score	High points	High rebounds	High assists	Location Attendance	Record
1	October 11	Purefoods	80–93	Lanete (14)	Quiñahan (10)	Lanete, Quiñahan (4)	Araneta Coliseum	0–1
2	October 16	Smart Gilas*	115–105	Buenafe (25)	Belga (11)	Buenafe (7)	Araneta Coliseum	
3	October 21	San Miguel	99–117	R. Yee (17)	R. Yee (10)	Billones (6)	Cuneta Astrodome	0–2
4	October 24	Rain or Shine	91–89	Buenafe (22)	Belga, R. Yee (10)	Lanete (6)	Gingoog, Misamis Oriental	1–2
5	October 30	Sta. Lucia	93–101	David (23)	R. Yee (11)	Buenafe, Lanete (4)	Araneta Coliseum	1–3

November

Game	Date	Opponent	Score	High points	High rebounds	High assists	Location Attendance	Record
6	November 6	Alaska	73–87	Buenafe (15)	Quiñahan (9)	Buenafe (5)	Cuneta Astrodome	1–4
7	November 14	Barangay Ginebra	79–83	Matias (12)	R. Yee (9)	R. Yee (5)	Tubod, Lanao del Norte	1–5
8	November 18	Coca Cola	106–97	M. Yee, Buenafe (19)	Belga (10)	Belga, Williams (4)	Araneta Coliseum	2–5
9	November 20	Barako Bull	102–86	Buenafe (17)	Quiñahan, M. Yee (7)	Quiñahan (7)	Araneta Coliseum	3–5
10	November 27	Talk 'N Text	105–118	David (24)	Sharma (6)	David (4)	Ynares Center	3–6
11	November 29	San Miguel	85–100	R. Yee (14)	Matias (8)	Buenafe, Quiñahan (4)	Ynares Sports Arena	3–7

December

Game	Date	Opponent	Score	High points	High rebounds	High assists	Location Attendance	Record
12	December 6	Rain or Shine	101–99	M. Yee (21)	Quiñahan (9)	Lanete (5)	Araneta Coliseum	4–7
13	December 11	Talk 'N Text	104–115	David (26)	Quiñahan, M. Yee (7)	Quiñahan, 2 others (4)	Ynares Center	4–8
14	December 13	Coca Cola	94–106	David (23)	Buenafe (7)	Lanete, M. Yee (3)	Araneta Coliseum	4–9
15	December 18	Barako Bull	102–99	R. Yee (21)	Quiñahan (12)	Billones (5)	Araneta Coliseum	5–9
16	December 25	Purefoods	74–85	Belga (15)	Belga, R. Yee (7)	Lanete (6)	Cuneta Astrodome	5–10

January

Game	Date	Opponent	Score	High points	High rebounds	High assists	Location Attendance	Record
17	January 8	Sta. Lucia	79–83	Cabagnot (17)	Cabagnot (9)	Williams (4)	Cuneta Astrodome	5–11
18	January 17	Barangay Ginebra	104–122	Belga (17)	Quiñahan (7)	Cabagnot (7)	Araneta Coliseum	5–12
19	January 20	Alaska	87–80	Quiñahan (23)	Quiñahan (10)	Cabagnot (7)	Cuneta Astrodome	6–12

2009–10 schedule

===== Playoffs =====
2010 PBA Philippine Cup playoffs game log
Wildcard

Game	Date	Opponent	Score	High points	High rebounds	High assists	Location Attendance	Record
1	January 24	Coca Cola	112–118	Buenafe (27)	R. Yee (12)	Buenafe (5)	Ynares Center	0–1

2009–10 schedule

== Fiesta Conference ==
=== Eliminations ===
==== Standings ====
Pos	Team	W	L	PCT	GB	Qualification
1	Talk 'N Text Tropang Texters	15	3	.833	—	Advance to semifinals
2	San Miguel Beermen	13	5	.722 (Note: Second seed playoff: San Miguel 88, Derby Ace 83)	2	Advance to semifinals
3	Derby Ace Llamados	13	5	.722	2	Advance to quarterfinals
4	Alaska Aces	11	7	.611	4	Advance to quarterfinals
5	Barangay Ginebra Kings	9	9	.500 (Note: Fifth seed playoff: Barangay Ginebra 115, Rain or Shine 88)	6	Advance to quarterfinals
6	Rain or Shine Elasto Painters	9	9	.500	6	Advance to wildcard round
7	Coca-Cola Tigers	8	10	.444	7	Advance to wildcard round
8	Sta. Lucia Realtors	5	13	.278	10	Advance to wildcard round
9	Air21 Express	4	14	.222	11	Advance to wildcard round
10	Barako Energy Coffee Masters	3	15	.167	12	

Source: PBA.ph

== Transactions ==
=== Pre-season ===
Burger King Whoppers

Players Added

Via Draft

- Japeth Aguilar
- Chris Ross
- Rogemar Menor

Via Free Agency

- Chico Lanete (From Barangay Ginebra)
- Ronnie Matias (From Barako Bull)
- Richard Yee

Via Trade

- Ronjay Buenafe (From Coca-Cola)
- Orlando Daroya (From Barangay Ginebra)
Players Lost

Via Free Agency

- Marvin Cruz

Via Trade

- Rogemar Menor (To Barako Bull)
- Chris Ross (To Coca-Cola)
- Arwind Santos (To San Miguel)
- Pocholo Villanueva (To Barangay Ginebra)

=== Philippine Cup ===
October 12, 2009	To Burger King 4 first round picks from Barako Bull (2010, 2012) and Talk 'N Text (2013 and 2014). Cash considerations	To Barako Bull Orlando Daroya	To Talk 'N Text Japeth Aguilar

January 4, 2010	To Burger King Alex Cabagnot; Wesley Gonzales	To Coca Cola Gary David; Chico Lanete

=== Mid-season break ===
March 3, 2010	To Air21 Yancy de Ocampo; Renren Ritualo	To Talk 'N Text JR Quiñahan; Mark Yee; Aaron Aban
March 8, 2010	To Air21 Rich Alvarez; Doug Kramer first round pick (2010)	To Barangay Ginebra Yancy de Ocampo second round pick (2010)
March 8, 2010	To Air21 Mike Cortez	To San Miguel Alex Cabagnot

=== Fiesta Conference ===
June 12, 2010	To Air21 Billy Mamaril	To Barangay Ginebra Mike Cortez

==== Imports recruited ====
Team	Player	Debuted	Final
Air21 Express	Keena Young (1/4)	March 24, 2010	April 9, 2010
Air21 Express	Jason Forte (2/4)	April 14, 2010	April 18, 2010
Air21 Express	Reggie Larry (3/4)	May 1, 2010	May 28, 2010
Air21 Express	Leroy Hickerson (4/4)	June 4, 2010	July 4, 2010
