= Jeff Chan (basketball) =

Filipino basketball player

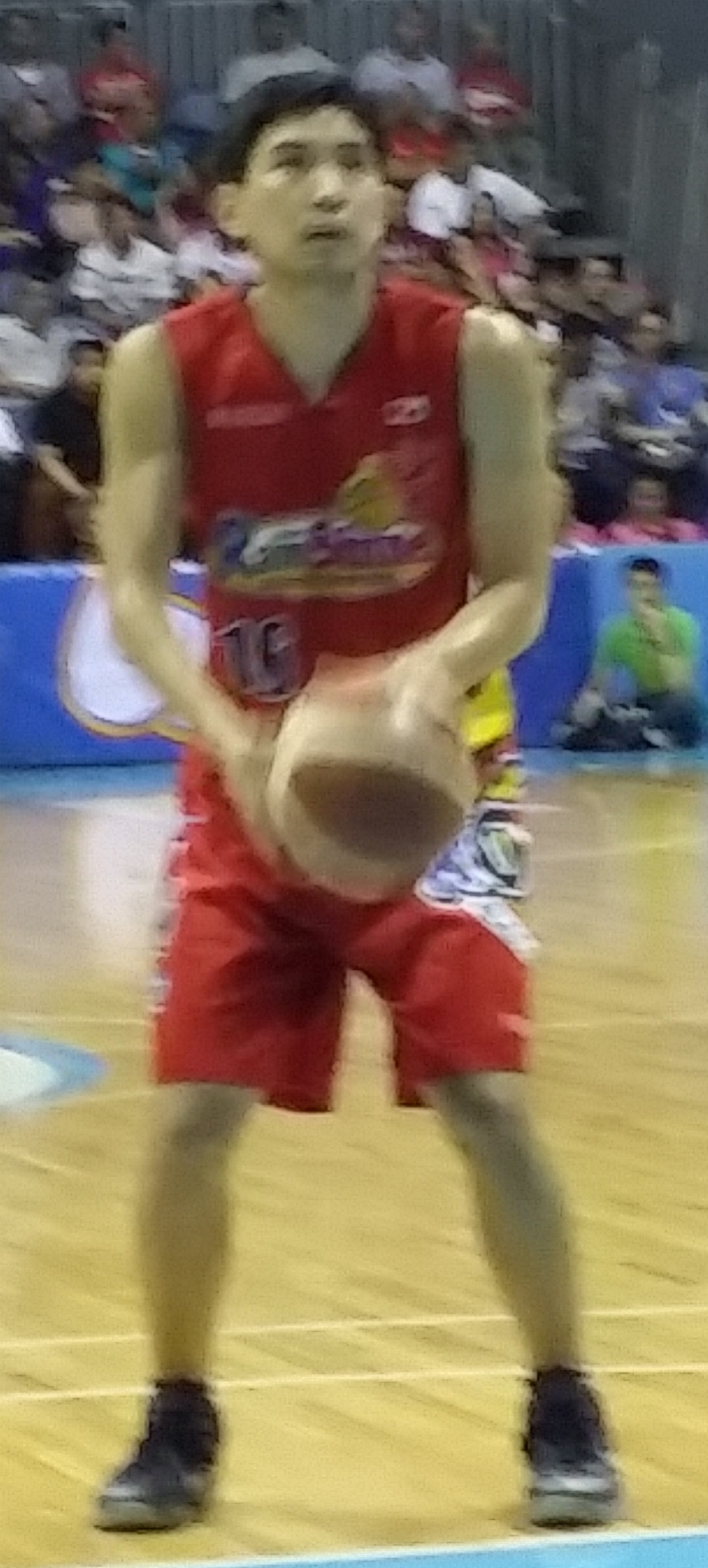
- Chan with the Rain or Shine Elasto Painters in 2016

Tikas Kapampangan
- Title: Head coach
- League: NBL–Pilipinas

Personal information
- Born: February 11, 1983 (age 43) Bacolod, Philippines
- Listed height: 6 ft 2 in (1.88 m)
- Listed weight: 185 lb (84 kg)

Career information
- High school: USLS (Bacolod)
- College: FEU
- PBA draft: 2008: 2nd round, 17th overall pick
- Drafted by: Red Bull Barako
- Playing career: 2008–present
- Position: Shooting guard / small forward

Career history

Playing
- 2008–2009: Red Bull Barako / Barako Bull Energy Boosters
- 2009–2017: Rain or Shine Elasto Painters
- 2017–2018: Phoenix Fuel Masters
- 2018–2022: Barangay Ginebra San Miguel
- 2022–2024: NorthPort Batang Pier
- 2025: Biñan Tatak Gel
- 2025: Pasay Voyagers

Coaching
- 2024–present: Tikas Kapampangan
- 2026–present: FEU (assistant)

Career highlights
- 6× PBA champion (2012 Governors', 2016 Commissioner's, 2018 Commissioner's, 2019 Governors', 2020 Philippine, 2021 Governors'); PBA Finals MVP (2012 Governors'); 6× PBA All-Star (2013–2018); 2× PBA All-Star Game MVP (2013, 2018 Visayas); PBA Second Mythical Team (2012); PBA Most Improved Player (2012); 3x UAAP champion (2003–2005); UAAP Mythical Team (2006); UAAP Sportsmanship Award (2006)

Jeffrei Allan D. Chan (born February 11, 1983) is a Filipino professional basketball player who last played for the Pasay Voyagers of the Maharlika Pilipinas Basketball League (MPBL). He is also the head coach for the Tikas Kapampangan of the NBL–Pilipinas. After being snubbed in the 2008 PBA draft, he became known as one of the best three-point shooters of his generation.

== Early life and college career ==
Chan was born and raised in Bacolod. He grew up with his mother and one brother, as his father had left the family.

He started playing basketball for the University of St. La Salle (USLS) in grade school where he competed in various tournaments and earned numerous titles for the school. In those days, he played as a power forward, emulating power forward Horace Grant. He was also an erstwhile member of a champion team in the ADIDAS Streetball Challenge in Western Visayas. During his high school years in the USLS, he played in numerous leagues in Bacolod and was also chosen to be one of the players for Western Visayas to play in the Palarong Pambansa. It was during his high school years that he started working on his outside shot. He then got many playing offers from different schools in Metro Manila where he chose to join the San Beda College training camp. But even before school started, he decided to return to play one last year with the USLS.

He then moved to Far Eastern University to play for the Tamaraws. In his rookie season, he scored nine points in game 2 of the UAAP finals to help FEU claim its 18th title. The Tamaraws were then awarded the 2004 championship after eligibility issues with De La Salle, and beat De La Salle again for the title in 2005. He averaged 18.6 points, 4.8 rebounds, and 3.0 assists per game during his senior year.

== Professional career ==
=== Red Bull Barako / Barako Bull ===
Upon graduation, Chan was drafted 17th overall by Red Bull Barako in the 2008 PBA draft. Coming into the draft, he was expected to be a first-round pick, but he slipped to the late second round. He signed a two-year deal with Red Bull. The snub motivated him to work harder. He had 15 points in a close loss to the Sta. Lucia Realtors. He followed that up with 23 points in a win over the Alaska Aces. In a rematch with the Realtors, he hit 23 points again to get the win, although the team failed to make it to the Philippine Cup playoffs. After the departure of Cyrus Baguio from the Barako Bull Energy Boosters, Chan became one of the go-to-guys and scoring threats of the team until 2009, when he was traded to the Rain or Shine Elasto Painters.

=== Rain or Shine Elasto Painters ===
==== Early years (2009–2011) ====
Chan, along with Mike Hrabak, was traded to Rain or Shine for Rob Wainwright and Mark Andaya. In a 2009–10 Philippine Cup win against his former team, he combined with Hrabak for 27 points on seven three pointers. He also competed in the Three-Point Shootout during the 2010 All-Star Weekend, but lost to Mark Macapagal of the Coca-Cola Tigers.

In the 2010–11 Philippine Cup, Chan came through with 19 points, seven assists, six rebounds, three steals, and the game-winning three pointer at the buzzer in a win over the Air21 Express.

==== Breakout season (2011–12) ====
To start the 2011–12 season, Chan scored 18 points in a win over the Barangay Ginebra Kings. He then scored 19 as Rain or Shine started the season 2–0. As they continued to a record of 4–1, he won a Player of the Week award for his consistent play. He then scored 20 in a 139–95 blowout of the Meralco Bolts. He then had 28 points (with 17 in the third quarter) to boost Rain or Shine to 6–1. At that point, he was leading the league in three pointers made and three-point percentage. In game 1 of their Philippine Cup semis against the Powerade Tigers, he scored 27 points to lead Rain or Shine to the win. In game 4, he led the team with 19 points to tie the series 2–2. However, Rain or Shine would lose the series, sending Powerade to the finals.

During the 2012 PBA All-Star Weekend, Chan participated in both the PBA Legends Game and the Three-Point Shootout. He then started Rain or Shine's Governors' Cup campaign with 20 points in a win over Alaska. Together with Gabe Norwood, they combined for 34 points in a win over Barako Bull. Rain or Shine finally made their first finals appearance in finals history that conference. In game 3 of the finals, he scored 18 points (with 11 coming in the third) as Rain or Shine took a 2–1 lead in the series. Rain or Shine eventually won its first championship, with him winning Finals MVP, Most Improved Player, and a spot on the Second Mythical Team.

==== First Philippine Cup finals appearance and All-Star MVP (2012–13) ====
In the 2012–13 Philippine Cup, Chan had 12 of his 25 points in the fourth quarter of a loss to Ginebra. He then scored a career-high 35 points (with the game-winner) against Air21, missing only three shots. Against the San Mig Coffee Mixers, he scored 22 points (with two four-point plays, with his second tying the game) and got the win. He then scored 12 of his 22 points in the fourth quarter for a come from behind win over Alaska. Throughout the first games of the conference, he averaged 18.5 points, around 48% from the field and 42% from three. He scored 25 points (with 14 in the third quarter) as the Painters rallied from being down 26 points to win over Meralco in overtime. In the quarterfinals, they faced Ginebra, who had beaten them twice in the elimination round. He struggled all throughout the quarterfinals, but Rain or Shine was able to beat Ginebra and move on to the next round. In game 1 of their semis against San Mig, he scored 18 points as Rain or Shine grabbed a 1–0 lead. In game 6, he exploded for 27 points to send Rain or Shine to its first ever Philippine Cup finals appearance, and earn himself a Player of the Week award. In the finals, Rain or Shine was swept by the Talk 'N Text Tropang Texters in four games.

In the 2013 Commissioner's Cup, Chan scored 16 points in a win over Alaska to clinch a quarterfinals spot for Rain or Shine. He was then named co-MVP of the 2013 All-Star Game along with Arwind Santos. After playing for the national team, he made his Governors' Cup against the GlobalPort Batang Pier. After struggling in his first games back, he broke out of his shooting slump by scoring 20 points on 4-of-5 from three in a win over Barako Bull. The Painters made it all the way to the semifinals against the Petron Blaze Boosters, where in game 3, he scored 18 points to keep the Painters' finals hopes alive. Petron however, ended those hopes when they won game 4.

==== Finals battles against San Mig (2013–14) ====
During the 2013–14 Philippine Cup, Chan scored 34 points (one shy of his career-high and including the go-ahead three-pointer with 8.2 seconds left) as Rain or Shine survived a comeback from Barako Bull. In that game, he went 11-of-15 from the field and made 7-of-10 from his threes. He then led his team with 16 points against Meralco before his teammate J. R. Quiñahan made a game-winning three with .7 seconds remaining. In game 2 of their semifinals rematch against Petron, he scored 20 points to lead his team to a 2–0 lead. Rain or Shine this time was able to beat Petron 4–1, setting them up for another finals rematch with San Mig, whom they beat in 2012. In game 1, he scored only eight points, but his back to back three pointers helped Rain or Shine take the lead, before his teammate Paul Lee sealed the win with a bank shot. He scored 18 points in game 2, but defending San Mig's Joe Devance drained his energy and San Mig tied the series. In game 3, he had a chance to win the game for the Painters, but poor execution led to him taking a deep three pointer with Marc Pingris defending him. The shot missed and the Coffee Mixers took a 2–1 lead. In a must win game 5, he scored 23 of his 24 points in the second half to keep Rain or Shine alive in the series 3–2. San Mig won the next game, giving them the championship.

In the first game of their 2014 Commissioner's Cup campaign, Chan scored 24 points, however the Painters blew a 16-point lead and Barako Bull won the game. He scored 24 again the following game, this time a win over Alaska. After the team went on a two-game losing streak, he scored 21 points and four rebounds to get a win against Meralco and end the streak. As a member of the national team, he was an All-Star once again. He scored 17 points in the All-Star Game. Rain or Shine then beat Meralco in the quarterfinals. They then lost to Talk 'N Text in four games in the semis as they only averaged under 88 points that series.

After losing their first two games of the 2014 Governors' Cup, Chan scored 19 points against GlobalPort to get Rain or Shine its first win of the conference. Against Barako, he and Rain or Shine import AZ Reid combined to score all but one of the Elasto Painters’ last 11 points that enabled them to claim the win. He then shot a scorching 64.7% from the field in their next two wins, earning him another Player of the Week award. In the semifinals, he had a hyperextended elbow, which affected his shooting. Still, Rain or Shine made it back to the finals. There, San Mig beat them once again in a best-of-five series, and achieved history with a Grand Slam.

==== Dealing with injury (2014–15) ====
In Rain or Shine's fourth game of the 2014–15 Philippine Cup, Chan scored 16 points (with almost all but two of them coming in the second quarter), but Talk 'N Text got the blowout win over them. He then had a career-high 10 rebounds along with 23 points in a win over Barako. He scored 11 fourth quarter points against GlobalPort to get Rain or Shine the win. Against Meralco he 16 points and got the win. In game 1 of their semifinals against Alaska, he had 17 points, but also seven turnovers that allowed Alaska to win the game. Alaska won the series in the next five games.

Chan was named to the All-Star Game, this time as a member of the South All-Stars. In the 2015 Commissioner's Cup quarterfinals, he scored 17 points, including a crucial three pointer and the game-winning steal off Ginebra's Michael Dunigan for the game-winning layup. He missed Rain or Shine's semifinals against Meralco due to plantar fasciitis, and was eventually ruled out for most of Rain or Shine's finals series against Talk 'N Text. He was able to return in game 6, and scored 11 points to force a game 7. Talk 'N Text however was able to win game 7 in double overtime.

Chan missed the start of the 2015 Governors' Cup to recover from the injury he suffered the previous conference. He, along with teammate Chris Tiu, returned to action against Barako. He showed that he was fully recovered with 12 points, five rebounds. three assists, and two steals in just 16 minutes 123–85 romp against the Blackwater Elite. In a rematch against Talk 'N Text, he contributed 10 points and nine rebounds for the win. For those performances, he was awarded Player of the Week. In game 2 of their semifinals against the San Miguel Beermen, he hit a game-winning three pointer with 7.6 seconds remaining. In game 6, he had 21 points, but he and the team were still eliminated by San Miguel.

==== Second championship with Rain or Shine (2015–16) ====
In the offseason, Chan was signed to a maximum deal worth P15.12 million over three years with a monthly salary of P420,000. He scored 15 points on 50% shooting from both the field and from three in a win over the Beermen. He then scored 19 in a win over Ginebra. Against Meralco, he had a game-high 24 points as he pulled the team to the win. In the first phase of the quarterfinals, he had 17 points to lead the team to the next phase despite Blackwater's Carlo Lastimosa scoring 35 points. They then defeated Talk 'N Text to move on to the semifinals. The Painters lost Game 1 of the semifinals to the Beermen as he was held scoreless. He bounced back with 16 points the following game, as he scored back-to-back clutch three pointers to protect their lead against San Miguel and seal the win. The Beermen eliminated them in game 6. Coach Yeng Guiao said after the loss about his team: "We’re still not ready for the finals, we’re not ready to win a championship, best thing we can do is get ourselves ready for the next conference”. Chan missed some games in the Commissioner's Cup due to an elbow injury. He then sprained his ankle against Alaska but the injury was rules as not serious. He suffered a black eye against the Mahindra Enforcer but still finished with 18 points in the win. He also shot 5 of 9 from the floor and grabbed five rebounds. After two double-digit scoring performances in wins over GlobalPort and Blackwater, he was named Player of the Week. Rain or Shine finished the elimination round with a record of 7–4. In game 1 of their quarterfinal series against Ginebra, he had 15 points, including a clutch jumper from the left wing that sealed the win for Rain or Shine. He then scored a team-high 22 points the following game to put away Ginebra and move on to the semifinals. In game 1 of their semifinals against the Beermen, he hit a clutch go-ahead three pointer as the Painters held on for the victory. The Painters eventually won the series 3–1, ending the Beermen's hopes for a Grand Slam. In game 2 of the finals against Alaska, he had 17 points off the bench as Rain or Shine took a 2–0 lead. Rain or Shine eventually won its second championship in game 6. Later that season, he competed in the Three Point Shootout once again. He also played in the 2016 All-Star Game for the South All-Stars.

==== Final season with Rain or Shine (2016–17) ====
Against Coach Guiao's new team the NLEX Road Warriors, Chan scored nine of his 16 points for a win in the 2016–17 Philippine Cup. Against Mahindra, he hit a clutch three pointer to prevent an upset from Mahindra. He then scored 14 of his 24 points including the go-ahead and-1 with 7.7 seconds left to overcome a 17-point deficit against the Phoenix Fuel Masters. For his performance, he was awarded Player of the Week.

=== Phoenix Fuel Masters ===
Chan was traded to the Phoenix Fuel Masters in 2017 for Mark Borboran and a 2020 second-round pick. Phoenix head coach Ariel Vanguardia wanted him for his experience and as a mentor to their star player Matthew Wright. The trade was a surprise to Chan, as he thought he would only play for Rain or Shine for the rest of his career. In his debut, he had 27 points (with 13 in the second quarter), four rebounds, five assists, and four steals. However, he had a team-high seven turnovers which was one of the reasons Meralco went on to win the game. He had 14 points but cramped up midway through the third quarter as Phoenix suffered its fifth straight loss.

During a 2017–18 Philippine Cup game against NLEX, Chan scored 18 points on 8-of-11 shooting in 27 minutes off the bench. He also added six boards, three assists, and committed just one turnover in that game, despite missing their previous game due to a flu and sore eyes. After Phoenix went on a two-game losing streak, he hit clutch free throws to end the streak against Ginebra and finished with 19 points, six assists and five rebounds. He had a chance to make the game-winner against Meralco, but his three pointer missed.

Chan scored 29 points in the 2018 All-Star Visayas Game and was named MVP of that game. In his final game with Phoenix, he scored 26 in a loss to Rain or Shine.

=== Barangay Ginebra ===
==== Commissioner's Cup champion (2018) ====
On June 18, 2018, Chan was traded to Barangay Ginebra in exchange for a 2018 first-round draft pick. Ginebra head coach Tim Cone wanted him as Ginebra had championship aspirations. Phoenix meanwhile did the trade as they wanted to give minutes to other players. He only had four points in his debut, but his leadership was apparent as Ginebra won against the Columbian Dyip. In game 1 of their quarterfinals against Meralco, he finally hit his first three, finishing with eight points in the win. In game 1 of the semifinals, which was against Rain or Shine, he unleashed 21 points in just 22 minutes of action as he helped Ginebra get the win. Ginebra eventually beat Rain or Shine in the semis and San Miguel in the finals to win him his third championship and first with Ginebra. In the 2018 Governors' Cup semifinals, he became the 91st player to hit the 5,000 points milestone.

==== 1st Governors' Cup title with Ginebra (2019) ====
Chan missed the start of Ginebra's season as he just had bone spurs surgery. He finally made his season debut in a win over Columbian. They failed to win a Philippine Cup title that season, as they were eliminated by the Magnolia Hotshots in game 3, despite his 17 fourth quarter points.

In a game against Blackwater, Chan landed his foot on Blackwater's James Sena. The injury was ruled as a sprained ankle and was out for two months. He returned to action in the Commissioner's Cup playoffs against the TNT KaTropa. Ginebra eventually lost to TNT.

Chan had his best game of the season against the Dyip in which he scored 10 of his 20 points in the fourth quarter and with the win clinched a top 4 seed in the playoffs. In game 2 of their semifinals, he scored 12 points and helped tie the series. He was consistent again in game 3, as this time he had 14 points. In the 2019 Governors' Cup finals, he hurt his hamstring. Still, he was able to play, and in game 6, they became Governors' Cup champions.

==== Philippine Cup champion (2020) ====
During the 2020 Philippine Cup, Chan scored 12 points in a win over Blackwater. He scored 12 again against Meralco while adding four rebounds and two blocks as Ginebra opened the season 3–0. He scored nine as Magnolia snapped their winning streak. In the semifinals, he aggravated a hamstring injury and missed some games. Despite playing hurt, he was able to contribute in the finals as he finally won his first Philippine Cup title.

==== Final seasons with Ginebra (2021–2022) ====
In the 2021 Governors' Cup, Chan sprained his ankle in a win over Blackwater, but kept playing. He had a vintage performance against Rain or Shine when he scored 12 of his 15 points in the second half that helped Ginebra get the win. In game 4 of their semis against NLEX, he scored 20 points to support Justin Brownlee's 47 as Ginebra returned to the finals. There, they beat Meralco once again in six games.

In the offseason, Chan signed a new one-year contract with the team. In the elimination round against NorthPort, he contributed 11 points, two assists and two rebounds. In game 1 of their playoff quarterfinal series against Meralco, he scored 11 points in a loss. Ginebra bounced back in game 2, but lost the series in game 3. He did however, get to make his 800th career three pointer in game 3, becoming the 19th player to do so.

=== NorthPort Batang Pier ===
On September 20, 2022, Chan was traded to the NorthPort Batang Pier in a three-team trade involving NorthPort, Barangay Ginebra, and San Miguel. He had 12 points in a win over NLEX. In game 2 of their Commissioner's Cup playoff series against Ginebra, he had 20 points, five rebounds, and six assists, but it wasn't enough as Ginebra moved on to the semifinals.

In 2023, Chan was voted in by fans as an All-Star Game reserve. However, he begged off from playing, and was replaced by Alex Cabagnot.

After the 2024 season, Chan's contract was not renewed.

== PBA career statistics ==
Legend
GP	Games played	MPG	Minutes per game
FG%	Field-goal percentage	3P%	3-point field-goal percentage	FT%	Free-throw percentage
RPG	Rebounds per game	APG	Assists per game	SPG	Steals per game
BPG	Blocks per game	PPG	Points per game	**Bold**	Career high

As of the end of 2023–24 season

=== Season-by-season averages ===
Year	Team	GP	MPG	FG%	3P%	FT%	RPG	APG	SPG	BPG	PPG
2008–09	Red Bull / Barako Bull	33	24.0	.354	.302	.804	3.2	2.0	.6	**.3**	9.1
2009–10	Rain or Shine	51	21.6	.388	.370	.719	2.8	1.4	.6	.1	9.0
2010–11	Rain or Shine	40	21.9	.320	.259	.687	2.4	1.7	.6	.2	7.6
2011–12	Rain or Shine	53	**29.2**	.415	.341	.766	3.0	2.0	.8	**.3**	**14.2**
2012–13	Rain or Shine	50	27.2	.363	.259	.745	**3.6**	2.6	.7	.1	11.9
2013–14	Rain or Shine	**60**	25.8	.422	.347	.771	2.6	2.2	.5	.0	11.4
2014–15	Rain or Shine	45	23.8	.386	.323	.779	2.9	2.0	**.9**	.0	10.3
2015–16	Rain or Shine	54	23.9	.429	.374	.818	2.9	1.8	.6	—	11.7
2016–17	Rain or Shine	35	25.2	.412	.297	.806	2.9	2.3	.6	.1	11.1
2016–17	Phoenix	35	25.2	.412	.297	.806	2.9	2.3	.6	.1	11.1
2017–18	Phoenix	51	23.2	.386	.327	.711	3.0	**2.8**	.6	.2	8.7
2017–18	Barangay Ginebra	51	23.2	.386	.327	.711	3.0	**2.8**	.6	.2	8.7
2019	Barangay Ginebra	30	14.7	.364	.296	.791	1.7	1.4	.3	.1	6.1
2020	Barangay Ginebra	19	14.4	**.430**	**.415**	.692	1.9	1.6	.2	.1	4.9
2021	Barangay Ginebra	29	14.7	.353	.303	.727	1.5	.5	.3	—	4.8
2022–23	Barangay Ginebra	38	17.5	.392	.280	**.857**	2.1	1.7	.5	.1	5.8
2022–23	NorthPort	38	17.5	.392	.280	**.857**	2.1	1.7	.5	.1	5.8
2023–24	NorthPort	20	16.1	.352	.275	.500	1.3	1.4	.7	.1	4.8
Career		608	22.7	.389	.322	.762	2.6	1.9	.6	.1	9.5

== National team career ==
Chan first joined the Philippines men's national basketball team in 2007. He was part of the team that won gold in that year's SEA Games. He could have played in the 2005 SEA Games if not for FIBA's suspension of the Philippines during that time.

In 2013, Chan was called up to Gilas 2.0 after players in his position such as James Yap, Mark Caguioa, and PJ Simon weren't able to commit. In his time with Gilas, he helped the team win the 2012 Jones Cup, finish runner-up in the 2013 FIBA Asia Men's Championship, and participated in the Philippines' first FIBA World Cup stint in 2014 after a 36-year absence. He also was a member of the team that finished seventh in the 2014 Asian Games, the worst in Philippine history until the 2026 edition.

In 2015, Chan was not released to Gilas 3.0 by Rain or Shine, as only Gabe Norwood was released by the team. He was later included in the roster for the 2016 FIBA Olympic Qualifying Tournament.

== Player profile ==
Chan has been compared to 1990s PBA sharpshooter Allan Caidic because of the similarities of their playing styles, and the similarities of their looks. He is left-handed, like Caidic, and often shoots from the left side of the court. He used to be seen as just a shooter, but over time, became more of a slasher.

== Personal life ==
Chan is married with two daughters. He met his future wife at a cousin's wedding. He is known to be very hands-on in raising his children. His youngest daughter Aerin played in the 2022 Junior World Golf Championships.
