= 2013–14 Rain or Shine Elasto Painters season =

- Head coach: Yeng Guiao
- Owners: Asian Coatings Philippines, Inc.

Philippine Cup results
- Record: 11–3 (78.6%)
- Place: 1st (tied with Barangay Ginebra)
- Playoff finish: Finalist (def. by San Mig Super Coffee, 4-2.)

Commissioner's Cup results
- Record: 5–4 (55.6%)
- Place: 4th (tied with Meralco)
- Playoff finish: Semi-Finalist (def. by Talk 'N Text, 3-0.

Governors' Cup results
- Record: 6–3 (66.7%)
- Place: 2nd
- Playoff finish: Finalist (def. by San Mig Super Coffee, 2–3.)

Rain or Shine Elasto Painters seasons

The 2013–14 Rain or Shine Elasto Painters season was the 8th season of the franchise in the Philippine Basketball Association (PBA).

== Key dates ==
- November 3: The 2013 PBA Draft took place in Midtown Atrium, Robinson Place Manila.
- February 7, 2014: Elasto Painters coach Yeng Guiao was served with a one-game suspension and missed Game 5 of the semifinals match-up between Rain or Shine and Petron. Rain or Shine won the game though, 97–88 while Guiao was watching in his house, and the Elasto Painters book first finals spot.

== Draft picks ==
Round	Pick	Player	Position	Nationality	PBA D-League team	College
1	3	Raymond Almazan	PF/C	Philippines	Cagayan Rising Suns	Letran
1	9	Alex Nuyles	SG	Philippines	EA Regen Meds	Adamson
2	2	Jeric Teng	SG	Philippines	Informatics Icons	UST
2	9	Gayford Rodriguez	SG	Philippines	None	Visayas
3	9	Ervic Vijandre		Philippines		De La Salle

== Roster ==
2013–14 Rain or Shine Elasto Painters roster
Players
Coaches

Pos.	#	POB	Name	Height	Weight	DOB (YYYY–MM–DD)	From
SG	1	(Philippines)	Jonathan Uyloan	6 ft 0 in (1.83 m)	185 lb (84 kg)		Golden West
PG	3	(Philippines)	Paul Lee	6 ft 0 in (1.83 m)	200 lb (91 kg)		UE
SG	5	(United States)	Gabe Norwood	6 ft 5 in (1.96 m)	210 lb (95 kg)		George Mason
SF	6	(Philippines)	Jireh Ibañes (C)	6 ft 1 in (1.85 m)	182 lb (83 kg)		UP Diliman
G	8	(Philippines)	Jeric Teng (R)	6 ft 2 in (1.88 m)	182 lb (83 kg)		UST
G	9	(Philippines)	Alex Nuyles (R)	6 ft 1 in (1.85 m)	199 lb (90 kg)		Adamson
PG	11	(Philippines)	Tyrone Tang	5 ft 7 in (1.70 m)	155 lb (70 kg)		De La Salle
SG	16	(Philippines)	Jeffrei Chan	6 ft 3 in (1.91 m)	170 lb (77 kg)		Far Eastern
PG	17	(Philippines)	Chris Tiu	5 ft 11 in (1.80 m)	175 lb (79 kg)		Ateneo
SG	18	(Philippines)	Ryan Araña	6 ft 1.25 in (1.86 m)	180 lb (82 kg)		De La Salle
C	20	(Philippines)	Jervy Cruz	6 ft 5 in (1.96 m)	220 lb (100 kg)		UST
C	30	(Philippines)	Beau Belga	6 ft 5 in (1.96 m)	285 lb (129 kg)		Philippine Christian
PF	48	(Philippines)	J.R. Quiñahan	6 ft 6 in (1.98 m)	295 lb (134 kg)		Visayas
PF	55	(Philippines)	Larry Rodriguez	6 ft 5 in (1.96 m)	200 lb (91 kg)		PMI
C	57	(Philippines)	Raymond Almazan (R)	6 ft 8 in (2.03 m)	200 lb (91 kg)		Letran

Head coach

- (Philippines) Yeng Guiao (UP Diliman)

Assistant coach(es)

- (Philippines) Caloy Garcia (St. Benilde)
- (Philippines) Mike Buendia
- (Philippines) Jay Legacion
- (Philippines) Matthew Makalintal
- (Philippines) Ricky Umayam

Legend

- (C) Team captain
- (CI) Commissioner's Cup Import
- (GI) Governors' Cup Import
- (EI) EASL Import
- (DP) Unsigned draft pick
- (FA) Free agent
- (IN) Inactive
- (S) Suspended
- (R) Rookie
- Injured

Roster

== Philippine Cup ==
=== Eliminations ===
==== Standings ====
Pos	Team	W	L	PCT	GB	Qualification
1	Barangay Ginebra San Miguel	11	3	.786 (Note: Head-to-head record: Barangay Ginebra 1–0 Rain or Shine)	—	Twice-to-beat in the quarterfinals
2	Rain or Shine Elasto Painters	11	3	.786	—	Twice-to-beat in the quarterfinals
3	Petron Blaze Boosters	10	4	.714	1	Best-of-three quarterfinals
4	Talk 'N Text Tropang Texters	8	6	.571	3	Best-of-three quarterfinals
5	San Mig Super Coffee Mixers	7	7	.500	4	Best-of-three quarterfinals
6	Barako Bull Energy	5	9	.357 (Note: Head-to-head quotient: Barako Bull 1.06, GlobalPort 1.01, Alaska 0.99, Meralco 0.95; eighth seed playoff: Alaska 94–91 Meralco)	6	Best-of-three quarterfinals
7	GlobalPort Batang Pier	5	9	.357	6	Twice-to-win in the quarterfinals
8	Alaska Aces	5	9	.357	6	Twice-to-win in the quarterfinals
9	Meralco Bolts	5	9	.357	6	
10	Air21 Express	3	11	.214	8	

Source: PBA.ph

=== Playoffs ===
==== Bracket ====
Quarterfinals
(#1 twice-to-beat)
1	Barangay Ginebra	97	108
8	Alaska	104	95
(Best-of-3)
4	Talk 'N Text	1
5	San Mig Coffee	2
(#2 twice-to-beat)
2	Rain or Shine	106
7	GlobalPort	96
(Best-of-3)
3	Petron Blaze	2
6	Barako Bull	0

Semifinals (Best-of-7)
1	Barangay Ginebra	3
5	San Mig Coffee	4
2	Rain or Shine	4
3	Petron Blaze	1

Finals (Best-of-7)
5	San Mig Coffee	4
2	Rain or Shine	2

== Commissioner's Cup ==
=== Eliminations ===
==== Standings ====
Pos	Team	W	L	PCT	GB	Qualification
1	Talk 'N Text Tropang Texters	9	0	1.000	—	Twice-to-beat in the quarterfinals
2	San Miguel Beermen	7	2	.778	2	Twice-to-beat in the quarterfinals
3	Alaska Aces	6	3	.667	3	Best-of-three quarterfinals
4	Rain or Shine Elasto Painters	5	4	.556 (Note: Head-to-head record: Rain or Shine 1–0 Meralco)	4	Best-of-three quarterfinals
5	Meralco Bolts	5	4	.556	4	Best-of-three quarterfinals
6	San Mig Super Coffee Mixers	4	5	.444	5	Best-of-three quarterfinals
7	Air21 Express	3	6	.333 (Note: Head-to-head record: Air21 1–0 Barangay Ginebra)	6	Twice-to-win in the quarterfinals
8	Barangay Ginebra San Miguel	3	6	.333	6	Twice-to-win in the quarterfinals
9	Barako Bull Energy	2	7	.222	7	
10	GlobalPort Batang Pier	1	8	.111	8	

Source: PBA.ph

=== Playoffs ===
==== Bracket ====
Quarterfinals
(#1 twice-to-beat)
1	Talk 'N Text	97
8	Barangay Ginebra	84
(Best-of-3)
4	Rain or Shine	2
5	Meralco	1
(#2 twice-to-beat)
2	San Miguel	79	95
7	Air21	92	101**
(Best-of-3)
3	Alaska	1
6	San Mig Coffee	2

Semifinals (Best-of-5)
1	Talk 'N Text	3
4	Rain or Shine	0
7	Air21	2
6	San Mig Coffee	3

Finals (Best-of-5)
1	Talk 'N Text	1
6	San Mig Coffee	3

**double overtime

== Governors' Cup ==
=== Eliminations ===
==== Standings ====
Pos	Team	W	L	PCT	GB	Qualification
1	Talk 'N Text Tropang Texters	7	2	.778	—	Twice-to-beat in the quarterfinals
2	Rain or Shine Elasto Painters	6	3	.667	1	Twice-to-beat in the quarterfinals
3	Alaska Aces	5	4	.556 (Note: Head-to-head quotient: Alaska 1.08, San Mig 1.02, San Miguel 0.99, Barangay Ginebra 0.97, Air21 0.94)	2	Twice-to-beat in the quarterfinals
4	San Mig Super Coffee Mixers	5	4	.556	2	Twice-to-beat in the quarterfinals
5	Petron Blaze Boosters	5	4	.556	2	Twice-to-win in the quarterfinals
6	Barangay Ginebra San Miguel	5	4	.556	2	Twice-to-win in the quarterfinals
7	Air21 Express	5	4	.556	2	Twice-to-win in the quarterfinals
8	Barako Bull Energy	3	6	.333 (Note: Head-to-head record: Barako Bull 95–94 Meralco)	4	Twice-to-win in the quarterfinals
9	Meralco Bolts	3	6	.333	4	
10	GlobalPort Batang Pier	1	8	.111	6	

Source: PBA.ph

==== Bracket ====
Quarterfinals (Top 4 twice-to-beat)
1	Talk 'N Text	99
8	Barako Bull	84
4	San Mig Coffee	97
5	San Miguel	90
2	Rain or Shine	111
7	Air21	90
3	Alaska	92
6	Barangay Ginebra	81

Semifinals (Best-of-5)
1	Talk 'N Text	2
4	San Mig Coffee	3
2	Rain or Shine	3
3	Alaska	2

Finals (Best-of-5)
4	San Mig Coffee	3
2	Rain or Shine	2

== Transactions ==
=== Recruited imports ===
Tournament	Name	Debuted	Last game	Record
Commissioner's Cup	Alexander McLean	March 9 (vs. Barako Bull)	March 26 (vs. Meralco)	2–3
Commissioner's Cup	Wayne Chism	March 31 (vs. GlobalPort)	May 2 (vs. Talk 'N Text)	5–5
Governors' Cup	Arizona Reid	May 20 (vs. Air21)	July 9 (vs. San Mig Super Coffee)	12–8
