= Ronjay Buenafe =

Filipino basketball player

Personal information
- Born: May 27, 1983 (age 43) Quezon City, Philippines
- Listed height: 6 ft 2 in (1.88 m)
- Listed weight: 190 lb (86 kg)

Career information
- High school: PCU (Manila)
- College: EAC
- PBA draft: 2007: 2nd round, 11th overall pick
- Drafted by: Coca-Cola Tigers
- Playing career: 2007–2022
- Position: Shooting guard

Career history
- 2007–2009: Coca-Cola Tigers
- 2009–2011: Air21 Express
- 2011–2012: Rain or Shine Elasto Painters
- 2012–2013: Meralco Bolts
- 2013–2014: Barako Bull Energy Cola
- 2014–2015: GlobalPort Batang Pier
- 2015–2016: Meralco Bolts
- 2016: Phoenix Fuel Masters
- 2016–2017: Blackwater Elite
- 2018: NLEX Road Warriors
- 2018: Mandaluyong El Tigre
- 2019–2020: Bicol Volcanoes
- 2021: GenSan Warriors
- 2022: Valenzuela XUR Homes Realty Inc.

Career highlights
- PBA champion (2012 Governors'); PBA All-Rookie Team (2008); PBA Blitz Game MVP (2008); MPBL All-Star (2020)

Ronald Jayson Buenafe (born May 27, 1983) is a Filipino former professional basketball player.

== Professional career ==
Being called as the "steal" of the 2007 draft, he performed well during his rookie season as a scoring guard. With the help of the then newly acquired Asi Taulava, they led the Tigers past the wildcard and faced the Alaska Aces in the quarterfinals where they lost 3–0. The following conference, their team had a more successful eliminations compiling a 10–8 record. Once again, they ended their run at the quarterfinals, this time at the hands of the Magnolia Beverage Masters. At the end of the season, Buenafe was named to the All-Rookie Team and was among the contenders for Rookie of the Year.

On his second season, he duplicated his performance though it didn't translate to wins for Coca-Cola.

For the 2009–10 season, Buenafe was acquired by the Burger King Whoppers. He played alongside Gary David and Wynne Arboleda. Despite stellar performances, his team still was not able to make the playoffs.

In the middle of the 2010–11 season, Buenafe was involved in a three-way trade where he, Ronnie Matias and Beau Belga were all traded to the Rain or Shine Elasto Painters. Though he still provided what the team needed, his numbers went down.

Before the 2012–13 season, he got traded again, this time to the Meralco Bolts in exchange for its 2014 first-round draft pick and provide offensive firepower alongside the backcourt duo of Sol Mercado and Mark Cardona.

== PBA career statistics ==
Legend
GP	Games played	MPG	Minutes per game
FG%	Field-goal percentage	3P%	3-point field-goal percentage	FT%	Free-throw percentage
RPG	Rebounds per game	APG	Assists per game	SPG	Steals per game
BPG	Blocks per game	PPG	Points per game	**Bold**	Career high

Correct as of September 24, 2016

=== Season ===
Year	Team	GP	MPG	FG%	3P%	FT%	RPG	APG	SPG	BPG	PPG
2007–08	Coca-Cola	42	24.6	.369	.317	.816	2.4	2.0	1.1	**.2**	11.2
2008–09	Coca-Cola	32	23.4	.406	.357	.825	**2.8**	1.6	.8	.1	11.1
2009–10	Burger King / Air21	38	**27.7**	.358	.291	.818	**2.8**	**2.2**	**1.2**	.1	**13.3**
2010–11	Air21 / Rain or Shine	40	23.0	.415	**.382**	.777	1.8	1.4	.8	.1	12.4
2011–12	Rain or Shine	**53**	19.5	.367	.290	.799	1.7	1.2	.7	.1	8.3
2012–13	Meralco	43	23.7	.345	.328	.806	2.4	1.1	.6	**.2**	9.5
2013–14	Barako Bull	34	20.1	.371	.331	.712	1.8	1.3	.8	.1	7.9
2014–15	GlobalPort	36	17.7	.341	.306	.660	2.4	.6	.6	.1	6.5
2015–16	Meralco / Phoenix	22	8.6	**.418**	.372	**1.000**	.9	.5	.1	.1	3.7
Career		340	21.5	.373	.325	.793	2.1	1.4	.8	.1	9.6
