= 2012–13 Rain or Shine Elasto Painters season =

- Head coach: Yeng Guiao
- General manager: Andy Jao
- Owners: Asian Coatings Philippines, Inc.

Philippine Cup results
- Record: 9–5 (64.3%)
- Place: 3rd
- Playoff finish: Runner-up (def. by Talk 'N Text, 0–4)

Commissioner's Cup results
- Record: 9–5 (64.3%)
- Place: 2nd
- Playoff finish: Quarterfinalist (def. by Barangay Ginebra in two games)

Governors' Cup results
- Record: 5–4 (55.6%)
- Place: 4th
- Playoff finish: Semifinalist (def. by Petron Blaze, 1–3)

Rain or Shine Elasto Painters seasons

The 2012–13 Rain or Shine Elasto Painters season was the 7th season of the franchise in the Philippine Basketball Association (PBA).

== Key dates ==
- August 19: The 2012 PBA Draft took place in Robinson's Midtown Mall, Manila.

== Draft picks ==
Round	Pick	Player	Position	Nationality	College
1	7	Chris Tiu	G	Philippines	Ateneo de Manila
3	7	Bacon Austria	G/F	Philippines	Ateneo de Manila
4	4	Jewel Palomique	G	Philippines	Mapúa

== Roster ==
2012–13 Rain or Shine Elasto Painters roster
Players
Coaches

Pos.	#	POB	Name	Height	Weight	DOB (YYYY–MM–DD)	From
SG	1	(United States)	Jonathan Uyloan	6 ft 0 in (1.83 m)	185 lb (84 kg)		Golden West
PG	3	(Philippines)	Paul Lee	6 ft 0 in (1.83 m)	200 lb (91 kg)		UE
PF	5	(Philippines)	Larry Rodriguez	6 ft 5 in (1.96 m)	200 lb (91 kg)		PMI
SF	6	(Philippines)	Jireh Ibañes (C)	6 ft 1 in (1.85 m)	182 lb (83 kg)		UP Diliman
SG	10	(United States)	Gabe Norwood	6 ft 5 in (1.96 m)	210 lb (95 kg)		George Mason
PG	11	(Philippines)	Tyrone Tang	5 ft 7 in (1.70 m)	155 lb (70 kg)		De La Salle
SG	16	(Philippines)	Jeffrei Chan	6 ft 3 in (1.91 m)	170 lb (77 kg)		Far Eastern
PG	17	(Philippines)	Chris Tiu (R)	5 ft 11 in (1.80 m)	175 lb (79 kg)		Ateneo
SG	18	(Philippines)	Ryan Araña	6 ft 1.25 in (1.86 m)	180 lb (82 kg)		De La Salle
C	20	(Philippines)	Jervy Cruz	6 ft 5 in (1.96 m)	220 lb (100 kg)		UST
SF	21	(Philippines)	Chito Jaime	6 ft 4 in (1.93 m)	200 lb (91 kg)		AMA
C	30	(Philippines)	Beau Belga	6 ft 6 in (1.98 m)	285 lb (129 kg)		Philippine Christian
SF	33	(Philippines)	Ronnie Matias	6 ft 4 in (1.93 m)	184 lb (83 kg)		Manila
PF	48	(Philippines)	J.R. Quiñahan	6 ft 6 in (1.98 m)	225 lb (102 kg)		Visayas

Head coach

- (Philippines) Yeng Guiao (UP Diliman)

Assistant coach(es)

- (Philippines) Caloy Garcia (St. Benilde)
- (Philippines) Mike Buendia
- (Philippines) Jay Legacion
- (Philippines) Matthew Makalintal

Team manager

- (Philippines) Andy Jao

Legend

- (C) Team captain
- (CI) Commissioner's Cup Import
- (GI) Governors' Cup Import
- (EI) EASL Import
- (DP) Unsigned draft pick
- (FA) Free agent
- (IN) Inactive
- (S) Suspended
- (R) Rookie
- Injured

Roster

== Philippine Cup ==
=== Eliminations ===
==== Standings ====
Pos	Team	W	L	PCT	GB	Qualification
1	Talk 'N Text Tropang Texters	12	2	.857	—	Twice-to-beat in the quarterfinals
2	San Mig Coffee Mixers	10	4	.714	2	Twice-to-beat in the quarterfinals
3	Rain or Shine Elasto Painters	9	5	.643	3	Best-of-three quarterfinals
4	Meralco Bolts	8	6	.571 (Note: Head-to-head record: Alaska 1–1 Meralco (Meralco +4))	4	Best-of-three quarterfinals
5	Alaska Aces	8	6	.571	4	Best-of-three quarterfinals
6	Barangay Ginebra San Miguel	7	7	.500	5	Best-of-three quarterfinals
7	Petron Blaze Boosters	6	8	.429	6	Twice-to-win in the quarterfinals
8	Air21 Express	5	9	.357	7	Twice-to-win in the quarterfinals
9	Barako Bull Energy Cola	4	10	.286	8	
10	GlobalPort Batang Pier	1	13	.071	11	

Source: PBA.ph

==== Game log ====
2012–13 PBA Philippine Cup game log
October

Game	Date	Opponent	Score	High points	High rebounds	High assists	Location Attendance	Record	
1	October 3	Petron Blaze	102–86	Chan (20)	Cruz, Araña (8)	Norwood (6)	Smart Araneta Coliseum	1–0	Boxscore
2	October 7	Barangay Ginebra	94–98	Chan (25)	Quiñahan (10)	Tang, Quiñahan (4)	Smart Araneta Coliseum	1–1	Boxscore
3	October 12	Air21	99–98*	Chan (35)	Cruz (8)	Chan (4)	Smart Araneta Coliseum	2–1	Boxscore
4	October 20	GlobalPort	94–83	Cruz (22)	Cruz (16)	Norwood (8)	Ynares Center	3–1	Boxscore
5	October 24	San Mig Coffee	80–79	Chan (22)	Norwood, Quiñahan (10)	Belga (4)	Smart Araneta Coliseum	4–1	Boxscore
6	October 27	Talk 'N Text	77–80	Cruz (14)	Cruz (12)	Norwood (5)	Victorias City	4–2	Boxscore

November

Game	Date	Opponent	Score	High points	High rebounds	High assists	Location Attendance	Record	
7	November 4	Meralco	106–81	Ibañes (23)	Cruz (10)	Rodriguez, Cruz (5)	Smart Araneta Coliseum	5–2	Boxscore
8	November 7	Alaska	101–93	Chan (22)	Rodriguez (8)	Norwood (5)	Smart Araneta Coliseum	6–2	Boxscore
9	November 14	Petron Blaze	86–96	Chan (20)	Cruz (7)	Norwood (4)	Smart Araneta Coliseum	6–3	Boxscore
10	November 17	Air21	71–62	Chan (15)	Rodriguez, Quiñahan (8)	Norwood (4)	Tubod, Lanao del Norte	7–3	Boxscore
11	November 21	Meralco	102–98*	Chan (25)	Cruz, Norwood (11)	Belga (5)	Smart Araneta Coliseum	8–3	Boxscore
12	November 25	Barangay Ginebra	90–97	Cruz (17)	Cruz (12)	Chan, Norwood, Quiñahan (4)	Smart Araneta Coliseum	8–4	Boxscore

December

Game	Date	Opponent	Score	High points	High rebounds	High assists	Location Attendance	Record	
13	December 2	San Mig Coffee	92–93	Chan (21)	Belga (6)	Norwood, Belga, Rodriguez, Araña (4)	Smart Araneta Coliseum	8–5	Boxscore
14	December 7	Barako Bull	116–101	Cruz (23)	Belga (7)	Lee (6)	Mall of Asia Arena	9–5	Boxscore

2012–13 schedule

=== Playoffs ===
==== Bracket ====
Quarterfinals
(#1 twice-to-beat)
1	Talk 'N Text	105
8	Air21	100
(Best-of-3)
4	Meralco	0
5	Alaska	2
(#2 twice-to-beat)
2	San Mig Coffee	92*
7	Petron Blaze	87
(Best-of-3)
3	Rain or Shine	2
6	Barangay Ginebra	1

Semifinals (Best-of-7)
1	Talk 'N Text	4
5	Alaska	2
2	San Mig Coffee	2
3	Rain or Shine	4

Finals (Best-of-7)
1	Talk 'N Text	4
3	Rain or Shine	0

*Game went into overtime

==== Game log ====
2012–13 PBA Philippine Cup playoffs game log
Quarterfinals: 2–1

Game	Date	Opponent	Score	High points	High rebounds	High assists	Location Attendance	Series	
1	December 12	Barangay Ginebra	82–65	Cruz (14)	Belga (11)	Chan (5)	Smart Araneta Coliseum	1–0	Boxscores
2	December 14	Barangay Ginebra	77–79	Lee (19)	Cruz (8)	Chan (5)	Smart Araneta Coliseum	1–1	Boxscore
3	December 16	Barangay Ginebra	102–89	Lee (25)	Cruz, Rodriguez (8)	Norwood (6)	Smart Araneta Coliseum	2–1	Boxscore

Semifinals: 4–2

Game	Date	Opponent	Score	High points	High rebounds	High assists	Location Attendance	Series	
1	December 19	San Mig Coffee	91–83	Chan (18)	Cruz (15)	Belga (5)	Smart Araneta Coliseum	1–0	Boxscore
2	December 21	San Mig Coffee	82–106	Rodriguez, Quiñahan (12)	Cruz, Belga (9)	Lee (5)	Mall of Asia Arena	1–1	Boxscore
3	December 25	San Mig Coffee	98–72	Lee (15)	Chan (8)	Norwood (7)	Mall of Asia Arena	2–1	Boxscore
4	December 28	San Mig Coffee	83–74	Norwood (14)	Quiñahan (7)	Norwood, 2 others (3)	Mall of Asia Arena	3–1	Boxscore
5	December 30	San Mig Coffee	67–79	Rodriguez (14)	Rodriguez, Cruz (7)	Cruz, Tiu (4)	Mall of Asia Arena	3–2	Boxscore
6	January 3	San Mig Coffee	90–83	Chan (27)	Norwood, Belga (12)	Lee (4)	Mall of Asia Arena	4–2	Boxscore

Finals: 0–4

Game	Date	Opponent	Score	High points	High rebounds	High assists	Location Attendance	Series	
1	January 9	Talk 'N Text	81–87	Cruz (13)	Cruz (9)	Rodriguez, Ibañes (3)	Smart Araneta Coliseum	0–1	Boxscore
2	January 11	Talk 'N Text	81–89	Quiñahan (16)	Lee (9)	Lee (4)	Mall of Asia Arena	0–2	Boxscore
3	January 13	Talk 'N Text	80–89	Tiu (14)	Belga (9)	Norwood (4)	Smart Araneta Coliseum	0–3	Boxscore
4	January 16	Talk 'N Text	82–105	Rodriguez (16)	Norwood (10)	Chan (4)	Smart Araneta Coliseum	0–4	Boxscore

2012–13 schedule

== Commissioner's Cup ==
=== Eliminations ===
==== Standings ====
Pos	Team	W	L	PCT	GB	Qualification
1	Alaska Aces	11	3	.786	—	Twice-to-beat in the quarterfinals
2	Rain or Shine Elasto Painters	9	5	.643	2	Twice-to-beat in the quarterfinals
3	Petron Blaze Boosters	8	6	.571 (Note: Head-to-head record: Petron 2–0 San Mig)	3	Best-of-three quarterfinals
4	San Mig Coffee Mixers	8	6	.571	3	Best-of-three quarterfinals
5	Meralco Bolts	7	7	.500 (Note: Head-to-head quotient: Meralco 1.01, TNT 1.00, Barangay Ginebra 0.99)	4	Best-of-three quarterfinals
6	Talk 'N Text Tropang Texters	7	7	.500	4	Best-of-three quarterfinals
7	Barangay Ginebra San Miguel	7	7	.500	4	Twice-to-win in the quarterfinals
8	Air21 Express	6	8	.429	5	Twice-to-win in the quarterfinals
9	Barako Bull Energy Cola	5	9	.357	6	
10	GlobalPort Batang Pier	2	12	.143	9	

Source: PBA.ph

==== Game log ====
2013 PBA Commissioner's Cup game log
February

Game	Date	Opponent	Score	High points	High rebounds	High assists	Location Attendance	Record	
1	February 9	Alaska	81–83	Šundov (30)	Šundov (15)	Norwood, Chan (3)	Smart Araneta Coliseum	0–1	boxscore
2	February 16	Meralco	91–82	Šundov, Araña (20)	Šundov (19)	Lee (6)	Puerto Princesa, Palawan	1–1	boxscore
3	February 22	San Mig Coffee	93–65	Cruz (16)	Šundov (11)	Tiu (8)	Mall of Asia Arena	2–1	boxscore
4	February 27	Air21	99–97	Šundov (17)	Belga (10)	Lee (7)	Smart Araneta Coliseum	3–1	boxscore

March

Game	Date	Opponent	Score	High points	High rebounds	High assists	Location Attendance	Record	
5	March 3	Barangay Ginebra	96–93	Belga (18)	Belga (9)	Šundov (4)	Smart Araneta Coliseum	4–1	boxscore
6	March 8	GlobalPort	103–95	Šundov (17)	Šundov (15)	Šundov, Tiu (4)	Smart Araneta Coliseum	5–1	boxscore
7	March 13	Talk 'N Text					Smart Araneta Coliseum		
8	March 16	Petron Blaze					Panabo, Davao del Norte		
9	March 20	Barako Bull					Smart Araneta Coliseum		

2012–13 schedule

== Governors' Cup ==
=== Eliminations ===
==== Standings ====
Pos	Team	W	L	PCT	GB	Qualification
1	Petron Blaze Boosters	8	1	.889	—	Twice-to-beat in the quarterfinals
2	San Mig Coffee Mixers	6	3	.667	2	Twice-to-beat in the quarterfinals
3	Meralco Bolts	5	4	.556 (Note: Head-to-head record: Meralco 1–0 Rain or Shine)	3	Twice-to-beat in the quarterfinals
4	Rain or Shine Elasto Painters	5	4	.556	3	Twice-to-beat in the quarterfinals
5	GlobalPort Batang Pier	4	5	.444 (Note: Head-to-head quotient: GlobalPort 1.01, Barako Bull 1.00, Alaska 0.99)	4	Twice-to-win in the quarterfinals
6	Barako Bull Energy	4	5	.444	4	Twice-to-win in the quarterfinals
7	Alaska Aces	4	5	.444	4	Twice-to-win in the quarterfinals
8	Barangay Ginebra San Miguel	3	6	.333 (Note: Head-to-head quotient: Talk 'N Text 1.05, Barangay Ginebra 1.00, Air21 0.96; eighth seed playoff: Barangay Ginebra 110–102 Talk 'N Text)	5	Twice-to-win in the quarterfinals
9	Talk 'N Text Tropang Texters	3	6	.333	5	
10	Air21 Express	3	6	.333	5	

Source: PBA.ph

== Transactions ==
=== Trades ===
==== Pre-season ====
August 20	To Rain or Shine 2015 second round pick	To Meralco 2012 2nd round pick (Kelly Nabong)

=== Recruited imports ===
Tournament	Name	Debuted	Last game	Record
Commissioner's Cup	Bruno Šundov	February 9 (vs. Alaska)	April 22 (vs. Brgy. Ginebra)	9–7
Governors' Cup	Arizona Reid	August 14 (vs. San Mig Coffee)	October 7 (vs. Petron)	7–7
