= TY Tang =

Filipino basketball player and coach

Phoenix Super LPG Fuel Masters
- Title: Assistant coach
- League: PBA

Personal information
- Born: September 25, 1984 (age 42)
- Listed height: 5 ft 7 in (1.70 m)
- Listed weight: 155 lb (70 kg)

Career information
- High school: Xavier School (San Juan)
- College: De La Salle
- PBA draft: 2008: 2nd round, 12th overall pick
- Drafted by: Rain or Shine Elasto Painters
- Playing career: 2008–2016
- Position: Point guard
- Coaching career: 2016–present

Career history

Playing
- 2008–2015: Rain or Shine Elasto Painters
- 2016: Mighty Sports

Coaching
- 2016–2021: Benilde
- 2019–2021: Nueva Ecija Rice Vanguards (assistant)
- 2023–present: Benilde (assistant)
- 2026–present: Phoenix Super LPG Fuel Masters (assistant)

Career highlights
- PBA champion (2012 Governors'); UAAP champion (2007); 2× PBL champion (2007-08 V-Go Extreme, 2008 Lipovitan Amino); PBL Finals MVP (2007 V-Go Extreme Energy Drink Cup); PBL Mythical Second Team (2007-08 Season); PBL Most Prominent Player (2008 Lipovitan Amino)

Tyrone Conrad Uy "TY" Tang (born September 25, 1984) is a Filipino former professional basketball player and a current assistant coach for the Phoenix Super LPG Fuel Masters of the Philippine Basketball Association (PBA). He last played for Mighty Sports of the Pilipinas Commercial Basketball League (PCBL). Tang played for the Rain or Shine Elasto Painters in the Philippine Basketball Association before retiring and then coming out of retirement to play in the PCBL. He was the twelfth overall pick in the 2008 PBA Draft by the Welcoat Dragons. He played point guard for the De La Salle Green Archers in college. He helped his team to a championship after top players like Renren Ritualo, Mike Cortez, Mark Cardona and Joseph Yeo graduated.

== High school and college career ==
He was first known in his high school days as a prospect while playing for Xavier School and leading his team to many victories. Scouts were already eyeing him until he chose to play with the De La Salle Green Archers when he entered college. He did not live up to the expectations in his rookie year, averaging 1 point and 1 assist. He had minimal contributions in the 2004 UAAP championship. In 2006 they were suspended for ineligible players. Following their suspension La Salle joined the Filoil Flying V Cup;Tang stunned all critics with his vastly improved game averaging 17 points, 5 rebounds and 4 assists. In the UAAP he led the archers against the 14-0 UE Red Warriors to win the Championship. He averaged 13 points, 4 rebounds and 4 assists in the playoffs.

== Professional career ==
=== Harbour Centre ===
After leading the Archers in the Season 70 championship, he joined the Harbour Centre in the PBL. He had his career high on the opening game with 26 points against the RP Team. At the season's finals, his team found themselves the "underdog" against Hapee, a team led by Fil-Am Gabe Norwood. He and Solomon Mercado led the team to an incredible come from behind-win against Hapee. Tang was adjudged the PBL Finals MVP for his performance and was included in the Mythical Second Team for the season. He also led the league in three-point shooting with 2.1 conversions per game and with a 35% shooting clip.

Tang was also part of the Harbour Centre that was the runner-up in the 2008 SEABA Champions Cup. Tang led his team in scoring averaging 18 points per game. Though they ended up losing to Indonesia, it was their only loss in the tournament.

=== Welcoat Dragons/Rain or Shine Elasto Painters ===
On August 31, 2008, at the PBA Draft at Market! Market!, Tyrone was drafted by the Welcoat Dragons as the twelfth overall. He announced his retirement on August 25, 2015, to focus on his business career.

=== Mighty Sports ===
However, Tang came out of retirement and signed as a player of the new team, Mighty Sports in the Pilipinas Commercial Basketball League in 2016.

== Coaching career ==
On November 23, 2016, Spin.ph reported that Tang will be appointed as the head coach of the CSB Blazers in the NCAA, following the resignation of former head coach Gabby Velasco at the end of Season 92 men's basketball tournament due to dismal performance of the team, where they only won a single game out of 18 outings. Tang compiled a 23–31 record in three seasons while at CSB, including near misses in the playoffs in the final two seasons. Tang and his family migrated to Canada in 2021, ending his coaching career in the Philippines.

== PBA career statistics ==
Legend
GP	Games played	MPG	Minutes per game
FG%	Field-goal percentage	3P%	3-point field-goal percentage	FT%	Free-throw percentage
RPG	Rebounds per game	APG	Assists per game	SPG	Steals per game
BPG	Blocks per game	PPG	Points per game	**Bold**	Career high

=== Season-by-season averages ===
Year	Team	GP	MPG	FG%	3P%	FT%	RPG	APG	SPG	BPG	PPG
2008–09	Rain or Shine	43	**20.2**	.378	.325	.714	**2.3**	2.2	.4	.0	**7.3**
2009–10	Rain or Shine	39	15.9	.349	.323	.480	1.4	**2.5**	.3	.0	4.0
2010–11	Rain or Shine	33	16.1	**.433**	**.339**	.640	1.9	1.9	**.5**	.0	5.6
2011–12	Rain or Shine	34	11.3	.375	.311	**.794**	1.2	1.3	.4	.0	3.9
2012–13	Rain or Shine	**51**	13.3	.338	.282	.676	1.6	1.2	.3	.0	3.6
2013–14	Rain or Shine	45	9.4	.322	.290	.720	.9	1.1	.4	.0	3.0
2014–15	Rain or Shine	42	12.4	.340	.250	.667	1.4	1.4	.3	.0	4.0
Career		287	14.0	.363	.302	.684	1.5	1.6	.4	.0	4.4

== Coaching record ==
=== Collegiate record ===
Season	Team	Elimination round					Playoffs				
Season	Team	GP	W	L	PCT	Finish	PG	W	L	PCT	Results
2017	CSB	18	4	14	.222	8th	—	—	—	—	Eliminated
2018	CSB	18	10	8	.556	5th	—	—	—	—	Eliminated
2019	CSB	18	9	9	.500	5th	—	—	—	—	Eliminated
Totals		54	23	31	.425	–	0	0	0	.000	0 championships
