= J. R. Quiñahan =

Filipino basketball player (born 1984)

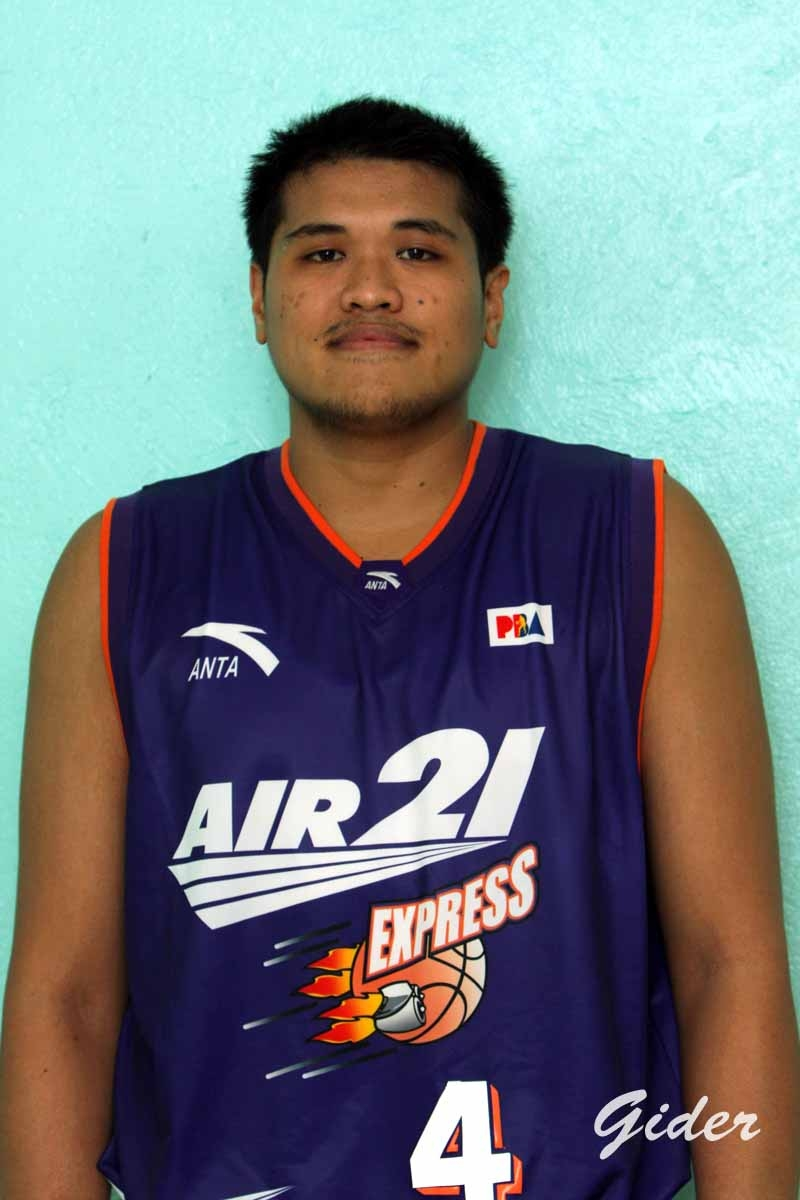
- Quiñahan with the Air21 Express in 2008

No. 48 – Cebu Greats
- Position: Power forward / center
- League: MPBL

Personal information
- Born: May 8, 1984 (age 42) Cebu City, Philippines
- Listed height: 6 ft 6 in (1.98 m)
- Listed weight: 235 lb (107 kg)

Career information
- College: UV
- PBA draft: 2007: 1st round, 7th overall pick
- Drafted by: Alaska Aces
- Playing career: 2007–present

Career history
- 2007–2008: Alaska Aces
- 2008–2010: Burger King Whoppers / Air21 Express
- 2010: Talk 'N Text Tropang Texters
- 2010–2011: Air21 Express
- 2011: Powerade Tigers
- 2011–2016: Rain or Shine Elasto Painters
- 2016–2017: GlobalPort Batang Pier
- 2017–2023: NLEX Road Warriors
- 2024: Valenzuela Classic
- 2025–present: Cebu Greats

Career highlights
- 2× PBA champion (2012 Governors', 2016 Commissioner's); 4× PBA All-Star (2009, 2016–2018); 5× CESAFI champion (2003–2006); 2× CESAFI MVP (2003, 2004)

Joseph Ronald Quiñahan (born May 8, 1984) is a Filipino professional basketball player for the Cebu Greats of the Maharlika Pilipinas Basketball League (MPBL). He played college basketball for the University of the Visayas (UV) Green Lancers, winning the Cebu Schools Athletic Foundation, Inc. (CESAFI) men's basketball title in each of his 5 years with UV, as well as winning two MVP awards in 2003 and 2004. After being drafted seventh overall by the Alaska Aces in the 2007 PBA draft, Quiñahan bounced around different PBA teams, before becoming part of the core for the Rain or Shine Elasto Painters, where he won two PBA championships, and established a partnership with Beau Belga, known as Extra Rice, Inc. owing to their large builds.

== Early life and college career ==
Quiñahan's first sport was football, and he played the position of goalkeeper. He then switched sports to basketball, where he helped the University of the Visayas (UV) Baby Lancers win two Cebu Schools Athletic Foundation Inc. (Cesafi) titles, the 2000 National Inter-Secondary title, the 2000 National Adidas 3-on-3 title, and multiple Cesafi college titles in 2003–2006, before leaving for the PBL.

== Semi-professional career ==
Quiñahan was dubbed "Baby Shaq" in the Philippine Basketball League where he played for the Granny Goose team not just because of his physical resemblance to the former Los Angeles Lakers center Shaquille O'Neal, but because of his dominant presence inside. Aside from Granny Goose, he also played for the Mail and More Comets. He also had a stint in the Mindanao Visayas Basketball Association (MVBA) with Arthro-Cebu.

== Professional career ==
=== Alaska Aces ===
Quiñahan was drafted by the Alaska Aces seventh overall in the 2007 PBA draft. In his rookie year in the PBA with Alaska, Quiñahan averaged 2.9 points, 2.7 rebounds, and 9.7 minutes in 39 games.

=== Burger King Whoppers / Air21 Express ===
On September 22, 2008, Quiñahan was traded by the Aces to the Burger King Whoppers for Mark Borboran. In a 2009–10 Philippine Cup win against Alaska, he scored a career-high 23 points.

=== Talk 'N Text Tropang Texters ===
In March 2010, him, Mark Yee, and Aaron Aban was traded by Air21 (formerly Burger King) to the Talk 'N Text Tropang Texters for Yancy de Ocampo and Ren-Ren Ritualo.

=== Return to Air21 ===
In August 2010, Quiñahan was traded back to Air21 in a three-team trade that sent Ali Peek to Talk 'N Text and future Rain or Shine teammate and the other half of Extra Rice, Inc., Beau Belga, to the Meralco Bolts.

=== Powerade Tigers ===
Quiñahan was again traded by Air21, this time to Powerade Tigers for 2 future draft picks.

=== 2011–12 ===
On August 26, 2011, Quiñahan and Norman Gonzales were traded to Rain or Shine Elasto Painters for Doug Kramer and Josh Vanlandingham. With Rain or Shine, he found his niche in the league. He also was paired with another beefy center in Beau Belga, forming the Extra Rice, Inc.'. In the Philippine Cup, he contributed to Rain or Shine hitting a franchise-record 22 three pointers in a win over Meralco. He was also part of Rain or Shine's championship team during the Governors' Cup.

=== 2012–13 ===
In a Philippine Cup win over Alaska, Quiñahan scored 20 points and grabbed seven rebounds. During a game against Meralco, he elbowed Sol Mercado in the face, almost causing Meralco's bench to retaliate against him. Quiñahan was ejected from the game and had to pay P20,000, but was not suspended. In a Game 2 semifinal loss, he led the team in scoring with 12 points. They made it all the way to the Finals, where Rain or Shine was swept by the Tropang Texters in four games. In the Governors' Cup, he suffered an Achilles injury that caused him to miss the semifinals.

=== 2013–14 ===
Against the GlobalPort Batang Pier during the Philippine Cup, Quiñahan had 14 points and eight rebounds, but a poorly executed play in the last nine seconds of the game led to an upset win by GlobalPort. He then combined with Belga to score 22 points and put Petron center June Mar Fajardo in foul trouble to give the Petron Blaze Boosters their first loss of the season after seven straight wins. They then combined for 35 points in a win over the Tropang Texters (with him scoring 19 and Belga 16). Against Meralco, he made the game-winning three pointer that gave Rain or Shine its sixth straight win, a franchise record. A meniscus injury during the Commissioner's Cup kept him out for the rest of the season.

=== 2014–15 ===
Quiñahan was able to recover in time for the start of the 2014–15 season. During game 4 of the Commissioner's Cup finals, he threw the ball at Talk 'N Text's Matt Ganuelas-Rosser while Ganuelas-Rosser was being shoved by Jireh Ibañes. For those actions, Quiñahan was fined P50,000 and suspended for game 5, while Ganuelas-Rosser and Ibañes were fined P40,000 each. Talk 'N Text eventually won the series. In a Governors' Cup win against GlobalPort, he scored a then career-high 24 points by making four of his eight three point attempts, and making all of his shots within the arc.

=== 2015–16 ===
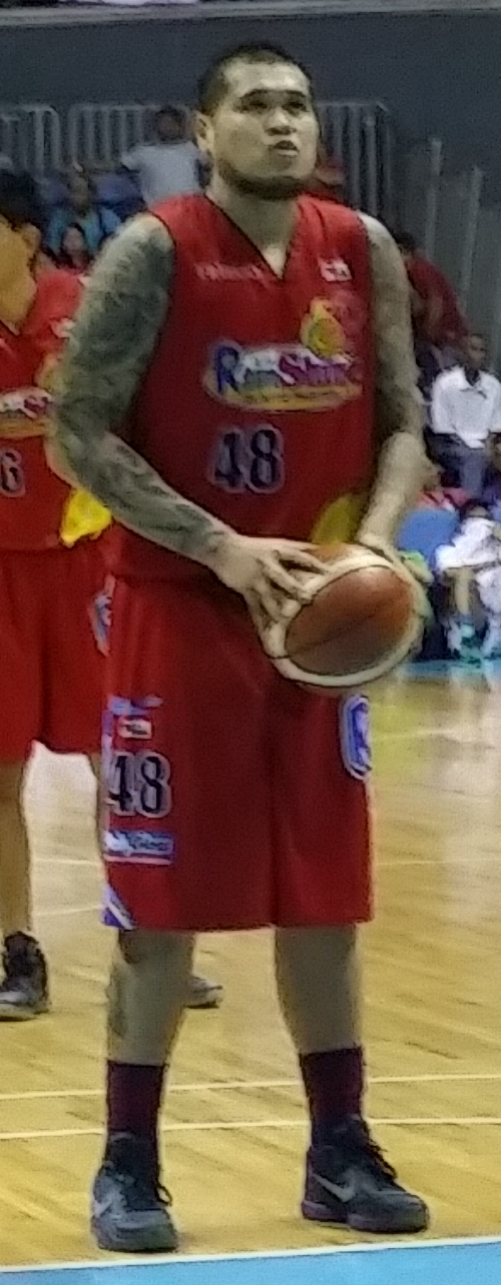
Quiñahan shooting a free throw in 2016

Quiñahan began the 2015–16 PBA season with a game-high 17 points along with eight rebounds and four blocks in a win over the Star Hotshots. He then won his first Player of the Week award in the season's first week. In a loss to Talk 'N Text, he led the team with 21 points. In a Commissioner's Cup loss to Meralco, he had 15 points in 22 minutes. He then had 21 points in a loss to Barangay Ginebra. Against the San Miguel Beermen, he had 15 points in the win. In Rain or Shine's third straight win of the conference, he led the team with 19 points. On March 21, 2016, Quiñahan scored his new career-high 25 points in a 101–114 loss to Tropang TNT. He credits his weight-shedding as one of the top reasons for his career season, weighing from a high of 295 pounds down to 260 pounds and until reaching 235 pounds. He led the team in scoring once again in a win over the Blackwater Elite with 15 off the bench as their burly import Pierre Henderson-Niles made his debut. In the Commissioner's Cup playoffs, they eliminated Ginebra in two games in the first round, with him contributing 21 points in the do-or-die game. They made it all the way to the Finals, where in game 3, he had 18 points off the bench. In game 6, he and Raymond Almazan combined for 29 points to get Rain or Shine's second championship in franchise history. In a Governors' Cup loss to TNT, he led the locals with 16 points. He then contributed 18 off the bench in a comeback win over the Phoenix Fuel Masters. He also got into the 2016 All-Star Game as a reserve for the South All-Stars.

=== GlobalPort Batang Pier ===
On October 13, 2016, Quiñahan was traded by the Rain or Shine Elasto Painters to the GlobalPort Batang Pier in exchange for Jay Washington. Before the start of the 2016–17 season, he signed a max contract worth two years. He contributed 10 points in his winning debut over the Mahindra Floodbuster. In a rout of NLEX, he had 18 points and seven rebounds. When he faced his former team Rain or Shine, he came away with 11 points, three rebounds, two steals, and the win. He was then named as Aldrech Ramos's replacement for the 2017 All-Star Week game in Lapu-Lapu City.

=== Reunion with Yeng Guiao (2017–2021) ===
On May 6, 2017, Quiñahan was traded again, this time to the NLEX Road Warriors along with Larry Fonacier as part of a four-team trade between the Road Warriors, GlobalPort, Meralco and TNT that also involved Garvo Lanete sent to the Bolts, Anthony Semerad to the KaTropa and Bradwyn Guinto, Sean Anthony and Jonathan Grey all to the Batang Pier. The trade reunited him with Yeng Guiao, the head coach he had won championships with at Rain or Shine, and was also his head coach at Burger King. In his NLEX debut, he had 12 points, five rebounds, and three assists in a loss to SMB during the Commissioner's Cup. He got his first win with NLEX against Alaska in which he had 16 points, seven rebounds, four assists, and two blocks in 26 minutes. They ended the conference with a win over Phoenix, in which he scored 12 of his 14 points in the fourth quarter.

In a Christmas Day win over GlobalPort during the 2017–18 Philippine Cup, Quiñahan contributed 19 points and nine rebounds. After that game, NLEX lost four straight games, including one against Rain or Shine in which he had 22 points. NLEX got back on track with a win over Ginebra, in which he scored 14 points, four in the last two minutes to give NLEX the lead and seal the win. A loss to TNT (despite his 20 points and seven rebounds) gave NLEX a record of 6–5, good to make the playoffs. In game 1 of their first round series against Alaska, he supplied 12 points and 10 rebounds as NLEX got the win. He then scored 16 points before fouling out in game 2 to send NLEX to its first-ever semifinals appearance. They faced the Hotshots in the semis, where in game 2, he led the team in scoring with 13 points as NLEX lost by 15 points. In game 4, he scored 11 of his 14 points in the third quarter as Fonacier and Kevin Alas also stepped up their scoring to break the game open for NLEX, and tie the series. In game 6, he was ejected from the game for accidentally hitting Magnolia guard Jio Jalalon in the face, which hurt NLEX as they had just lost Alas to an ACL injury the previous game. NLEX went on to lose that game. In a Commissioner's Cup loss to Meralco, he had 18 points. They got their first win of the conference against Phoenix in which he had 16 points. They then lost to Alaska despite his 17 points and five rebounds. In their Governors' Cup game against Alaska, he had 10 of his 15 points in overtime to go with his nine rebounds and get the win.

During the offseason, Quiñahan signed with NLEX for two more seasons. He started the season alongside a debuting Poy Erram and Alas, who was returning after his ACL injury. In his first game of the season, he had 19 points, five rebounds, and five assists, but those were not enough against Rain or Shine. In a loss to the Batang Pier, he had 18 points, six assists, and five rebounds. They got a win against the Bolts, in which he had 16 points (including a clutch free throw with 31 seconds left in the game). Their record went down to 2–4 with a loss to the Beermen, in which he had a double-double of 17 points and 10 rebounds. He then led NLEX to a win over Alaska in which he had 14 points and four triples. It was then revealed that he had been playing through a meniscal tear on his right knee, as the team was without star guards Alas and Kiefer Ravena for a lengthy period of time due to another ACL injury and a FIBA suspension respectively. In a loss to Ginebra, he made 15 points, all from three, along with seven rebounds and six assists. He got surgery for his knee after the Philippine Cup ended. In the Governors' Cup, NLEX started with a win over Meralco, in which he had 19 points on five triples. He then was crucial in NLEX completing a 26-point comeback win over the Hotshots with his 14 points and eight rebounds, that led to Jericho Cruz's game-winning putback. NLEX won five straight games before a loss to the Batang Pier, in which Alas returned from his injury. They ended eliminations as the top seed. They faced the Batang Pier in the first round, where NLEX lost despite his 20 points as his teammates Erram and Paul Varilla were ejected from the game. Their season ended the following game in which he had 13 points and 14 rebounds, but NLEX became the fourth #1 seed to lose to a #8 seed in the quarterfinals in league history.

Quiñahan started the 2020 season with a game and career-high 26 points in a loss to Ginebra, although he didn't finish the game due to being ejected in the third quarter for a flagrant foul for hitting Ginebra's Stanley Pringle in the face and a technical foul for arguing with a referee. He was fined for being ejected on the opening game. NLEX then lost to the Hotshots, as he fouled out of the game with 16 points and eight rebounds. They got their first win of the season against the Batang Pier in which he had 17 points while Ravena and Alas combined for 41 points. In a loss to Phoenix, he had 18 points. NLEX then won over the league-leading TNT, but he was given a flagrant foul after an altercation with Bobby Ray Parks Jr. near the end of the game. He was eventually fined P5,000. In a loss to Alaska, he scored 24 points, nine rebounds, and five assists. NLEX did not make the playoffs that season.

On January 6, 2021, Quiñahan had his contract extended. In a win over the Terrafirma Dyip, he had 19 points with three treys and timely baskets that prevented Terrafirma from taking the lead. In a win over Alaska, which was their first game without Ravena who had left for the Japanese B.League, he stepped up with a team-high 18 points. NLEX got its third straight win of the conference against Phoenix, in which he had 14 points and seven rebounds off the bench. He scored 14 again against the Hotshots, but this time the winning streak was broken in double overtime. He missed one game due to a hand injury, but returned the following game to hand Blackwater their 18th straight loss with 16 points and eight rebounds. In the 2021 Philippine Cup playoffs, NLEX faced Meralco and won game 1. Their campaign ended in Game 2 with a loss. In a Governors' Cup win over TNT, he had 15 points. NLEX finished the elimination round of that conference with a top-4 record. Before the playoffs, he agreed to stay with NLEX for one more season. In the playoffs, they defeated Alaska in the first round, before falling to Ginebra in the semis.

==== 2022–23 season ====
Quiñahan started the season with 18 points in a win over Terrafirma. He scored 18 again in a close win over TNT. In a win against Phoenix, he scored 21 points with three made triples. He then led the team in scoring with 17 points in a loss to the Hotshots. After the Philippine Cup, Coach Guiao parted ways with NLEX, and was eventually replaced by Frankie Lim. Quiñahan was then taken out of the rotation due to a heel injury.

During the 2023 offseason, Quiñahan was involved in a brawl during an exhibition game in his hometown of Cebu. Several PBA players were also involved in the exhibition game, including former PBA teammate Belga, Jio Jalalon, and Robert Bolick. His involvement in the brawl shocked NLEX management, as he had been recovering from an Achilles tendon surgery, and had not been practicing with the team for a long while, other than shooting drills, some weights training and strengthening during practices. The PBA imposed fines and sanctions on the four players, with Quiñahan hit with a ₱70,000 fine for playing in an exhibition game without the approval from the league and their respective mother teams and for their roles in the brawl. On May 6, 2023, NLEX terminated his contract, making him a free agent.

=== Zamboanga Valientes (2025) ===
He joined the Zamboanga Valientes during the Governor Hofer Invitational Basketball Championship in Zamboanga Sibugay.

== PBA career statistics ==
Legend
GP	Games played	MPG	Minutes per game
FG%	Field-goal percentage	3P%	3-point field-goal percentage	FT%	Free-throw percentage
RPG	Rebounds per game	APG	Assists per game	SPG	Steals per game
BPG	Blocks per game	PPG	Points per game	**Bold**	Career high

As of the end of 2022–23 season

=== Season-by-season averages ===
Year	Team	GP	MPG	FG%	3P%	FT%	RPG	APG	SPG	BPG	PPG
2007–08	Alaska	37	9.7	.464	.333	.593	2.6	.6	.1	.4	2.9
2008–09	Air21 / Burger King	42	22.7	.441	.222	.575	5.7	1.6	.6	**1.5**	7.2
2009–10	Burger King	36	15.7	.459	.308	.429	4.7	1.2	.3	.8	4.9
2009–10	Talk 'N Text	36	15.7	.459	.308	.429	4.7	1.2	.3	.8	4.9
2010–11	Air21	25	18.6	**.475**	.214	.639	5.0	.9	.3	.9	7.0
2010–11	Powerade	25	18.6	**.475**	.214	.639	5.0	.9	.3	.9	7.0
2011–12	Rain or Shine	52	20.4	.434	.237	.667	5.6	1.4	.4	1.0	7.2
2012–13	Rain or Shine	**56**	20.1	.398	.285	.682	4.5	1.2	.3	.6	6.7
2013–14	Rain or Shine	24	21.9	.360	.319	.610	5.0	1.5	.4	.7	6.9
2014–15	Rain or Shine	53	16.0	.397	.294	.781	3.3	1.4	.4	.5	5.5
2015–16	Rain or Shine	54	22.3	.470	.289	.729	4.9	1.9	.5	.6	11.7
2016–17	GlobalPort	36	26.1	.435	.284	.753	5.8	1.9	.6	.8	11.1
2016–17	NLEX	36	26.1	.435	.284	.753	5.8	1.9	.6	.8	11.1
2017–18	NLEX	42	26.2	.405	.273	.718	5.0	2.5	.5	.8	11.4
2019	NLEX	31	28.0	.438	**.378**	**.833**	4.7	2.5	**1.1**	.5	11.8
2020	NLEX	11	**30.8**	.420	.362	**.833**	**6.5**	**3.0**	.2	.5	**13.8**
2021	NLEX	28	23.9	.361	.189	.822	3.8	2.0	.4	1.0	9.4
2022–23	NLEX	13	26.4	.395	.271	.552	4.5	2.5	.3	.9	11.8
Career		540	21.0	.424	.288	.699	4.7	1.6	.4	.8	8.2

== National team ==
=== 3x3 Tournaments ===
Quiñahan represented the Philippines in the 2017 FIBA 3x3 World Cup on June 17 to 21, 2017 in Nantes, France. They finished the tournament at 11th place.

== Player profile ==
A 6 ft 6 in (1.98 m) slotman who loves to use his heft to be effective inside the paint, Quiñahan also has a decent stroke from the outside and can consistently hit the open jumper from any distance.

== Personal life ==
In 2012, Quiñahan married longtime partner Eunice Llanos while Rain or Shine was in the Philippine Cup semifinals. They have a son, Joseph Rainier, and own a fast food kiosk "Adonohan ni Quiñahan".

The Quiñahans lost their home and possessions during Typhoon Tino. During the floods, after evacuating his family, he helped rescue his fast food kiosk employees and his neighbors.
