= Larry Rodriguez (basketball) =

Filipino basketball player

No. 5 – GenSan Warriors
- Position: Power forward
- League: MPBL

Personal information
- Born: May 5, 1983 (age 43) Narvacan, Ilocos Sur, Philippines
- Listed height: 6 ft 5 in (1.96 m)
- Listed weight: 210 lb (95 kg)

Career information
- College: PMI Colleges
- PBA draft: 2008: 1st round, 9th overall pick
- Drafted by: Barako Bull Energy Boosters
- Playing career: 2008–present

Career history
- 2008–2009: Barako Bull Energy Boosters
- 2009–2010: Coca-Cola Tigers
- 2010–2014: Rain or Shine Elasto Painters
- 2014–2015: Blackwater Elite
- 2015–2016: Talk 'N Text Tropang Texters/TNT Tropang Texters
- 2018−2021: San Juan Knights
- 2021–2023: Davao Occidental Tigers
- 2023–present: GenSan / South Cotabato Warriors

Career highlights
- PBA champion (2012 Governors'); PBA All-Rookie Team (2009); MPBL champion (2019); 2x MPBL All-Star (2019, 2024); PSL champion (2022); PBL Mythical First Team (2008)
Medals
Men's basketball
Representing Philippines
Southeast Asian Games
Gold medal – first place	2007 Nakhon Ratchasima	Team

Larry Rodriguez (born May 5, 1983) is a Filipino professional basketball player for the South Cotabato Warriors franchise of the Maharlika Pilipinas Basketball League (MPBL) and Pilipinas Super League (PSL). He was drafted ninth overall in the 2008 PBA draft alongside prolific rookies Gabe Norwood, Jared Dillinger, and Jayson Castro.

== Professional career ==
In 2010, Rodriguez was traded to Rain or Shine in exchange for Eddie Laure and the Rain or Shine's 2011 first-round draft pick.

== PBA career statistics ==
Legend
GP	Games played	MPG	Minutes per game
FG%	Field-goal percentage	3P%	3-point field-goal percentage	FT%	Free-throw percentage
RPG	Rebounds per game	APG	Assists per game	SPG	Steals per game
BPG	Blocks per game	PPG	Points per game	**Bold**	Career high

=== Season-by-season averages ===
Year	Team	GP	MPG	FG%	3P%	FT%	RPG	APG	SPG	BPG	PPG
2008–09	Red Bull / Barako Bull	28	18.7	.517	.000	.600	**5.8**	1.2	.3	.8	8.4
2009–10	Coca-Cola	30	18.0	.522	.000	.652	5.4	1.2	.3	.5	7.0
2010–11	Rain or Shine	40	**22.1**	.516	**.250**	.670	**5.8**	1.3	**.5**	**1.0**	**9.5**
2011–12	Rain or Shine	24	17.6	**.557**	—	.649	5.6	**1.5**	.3	.8	8.5
2012–13	Rain or Shine	55	14.8	.492	.000	.841	3.8	1.0	.4	.4	5.9
2013–14	Rain or Shine	**60**	13.7	.475	.000	.758	3.8	.9	.2	.4	4.6
2014–15	Blackwater	10	15.9	.278	.000	**1.000**	5.4	.8	.4	.3	3.5
2015–16	TNT	5	3.7	.333	—	—	1.0	.0	.2	.0	.4
Career		252	16.6	.500	.059	.695	4.7	1.1	.3	.6	6.6
