= Jireh Ibañes =

Filipino basketball player

Rain or Shine Elasto Painters
- Title: Assistant team manager
- League: PBA

Personal information
- Born: April 20, 1982 (age 44) Roxas, Palawan, Philippines
- Listed height: 6 ft 2 in (1.88 m)
- Listed weight: 182 lb (83 kg)

Career information
- College: UP
- PBA draft: 2006: 2nd round, 11th overall pick
- Drafted by: Welcoat Dragons
- Playing career: 2006–2017
- Position: Shooting guard / small forward

Career history
- 2006–2017: Welcoat Dragons / Rain or Shine Elasto Painters

Career highlights
- 2× PBA champion (2012 Governors', 2016 Commissioner's); PBA Defensive Player of the Year (2012); 2× PBA All-Defensive Team (2012, 2014); PBA All-Rookie Team (2007); PBA Order of Merit (2012)

Jireh Ralph A. Ibañes (born April 20, 1982) is a Filipino former professional basketball player of the Philippine Basketball Association (PBA). He played his entire career for the Rain or Shine Elasto Painters and is now serving as an assistant team manager. He was drafted eleventh overall by then-known Welcoat in 2006. He is the last player to have played from the original Welcoat team of 2006–07.

== Professional career ==
Ibañes was drafted by Welcoat Dragons in the 2006 PBA draft as the eleventh overall pick.

On January 15, 2016, in the Game 6 of the 2015–16 PBA Philippine Cup semifinals against the San Miguel Beermen, Ibañes accidentally injured San Miguel and Philippine national team star June Mar Fajardo while boxing Fajardo out for a rebound. Ibañes was the subject of criticism of netizens (especially San Miguel fans) over the incident. However, he apologized for the incident, saying it was just an accident and had no intention to hurt Fajardo and hoped for a speedy recovery for Fajardo.

== Player profile ==
Ibañes is arguably one of the best defenders in the PBA during his playing career often guarding the opposing team's best scorer, which helped him win the league's Defensive Player of the Year award and All-Defensive team in the 2012 and 2014 seasons.

== PBA career statistics ==
Legend
GP	Games played	MPG	Minutes per game
FG%	Field-goal percentage	3P%	3-point field-goal percentage	FT%	Free-throw percentage
RPG	Rebounds per game	APG	Assists per game	SPG	Steals per game
BPG	Blocks per game	PPG	Points per game	**Bold**	Career high

=== Season-by-season averages ===
Year	Team	GP	MPG	FG%	3P%	FT%	RPG	APG	SPG	BPG	PPG
2006–07	Welcoat	31	**21.9**	.439	.269	.576	**2.9**	1.2	.5	**.6**	**6.9**
2007–08	Welcoat	33	16.3	.450	**.400**	.509	1.8	.8	**.6**	.4	4.5
2008–09	Rain or Shine	43	13.8	.345	.225	.625	1.7	.8	.4	.3	3.9
2009–10	Rain or Shine	43	8.3	.393	.067	**.714**	.9	.4	.2	.1	2.0
2010–11	Rain or Shine	31	10.7	.412	.294	.531	1.1	.9	.2	.2	3.1
2011–12	Rain or Shine	50	15.5	.426	.266	.614	1.5	.8	.4	.4	4.2
2012–13	Rain or Shine	49	17.4	**.460**	.259	.479	2.1	1.2	**.6**	.2	4.5
2013–14	Rain or Shine	**56**	12.4	.351	.229	.419	1.7	.9	.3	.2	2.1
2014–15	Rain or Shine	52	13.7	.406	.281	.686	1.9	.7	.2	.2	3.8
2015–16	Rain or Shine	35	10.1	.395	.154	.636	1.1	.7	.3	.0	2.3
2016–17	Rain or Shine	3	7.7	.200	.333	—	.3	**2.0**	.0	.3	1.0
Career		426	13.9	.409	.257	.575	1.7	.9	.4	.3	3.6
