= Beau Belga =

Filipino basketball player (born 1986)

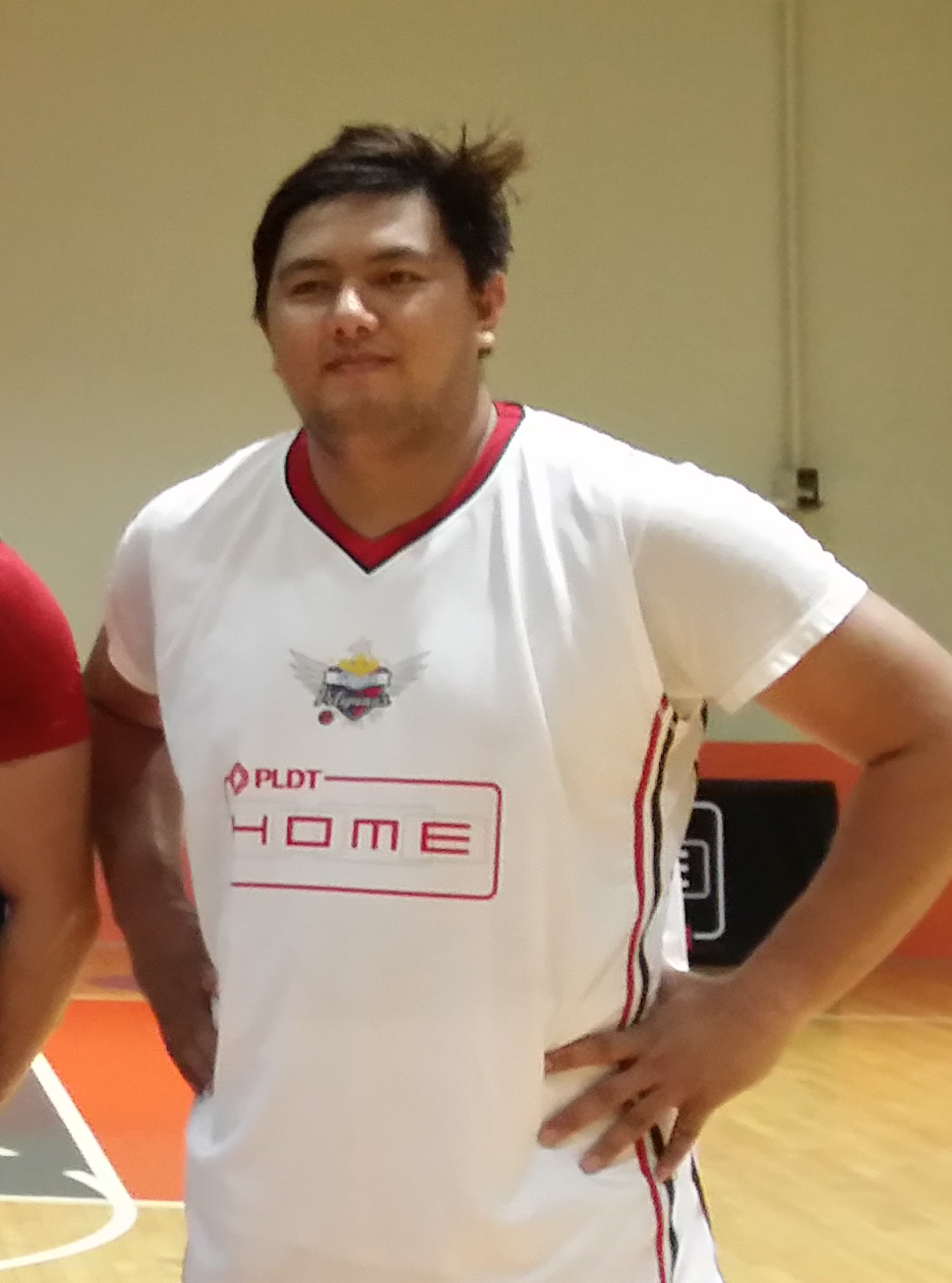
- Belga in 2014

No. 28 – Rain or Shine Elasto Painters
- Position: Center
- League: PBA

Personal information
- Born: November 30, 1986 (age 39) Gubat, Sorsogon, Philippines
- Listed height: 6 ft 5 in (1.96 m)
- Listed weight: 280 lb (127 kg)

Career information
- College: PCU
- PBA draft: 2008: 1st round, 7th overall pick
- Drafted by: Purefoods Tender Juicy Giants
- Playing career: 2008–present

Career history

Playing
- 2008–2009: Purefoods Tender Juicy Giants
- 2009–2010: Burger King Whoppers / Air21 Express
- 2010–2011: Meralco Bolts
- 2011–present: Rain or Shine Elasto Painters

Coaching
- 2020: UST Growling Tigers (assistant)

Career highlights
- 2× PBA champion (2012 Governors', 2016 Commissioner's); 3× PBA All-Star (2013–2015); 2× PBA All-Star Week Obstacle Challenge champion (2018, 2019); NCAA Philippines champion (2004)

Beau Michael Vincent Esparrago Belga (born November 30, 1986) is a Filipino professional basketball player for the Rain or Shine Elasto Painters of the Philippine Basketball Association (PBA). He also served as an assistant coach for the UST Growling Tigers.

== Early life ==
Belga was born and raised in Gubat, Sorsogon and is the eldest among the three siblings. His father was a family driver while his mother was a housewife. At a young age, he helped his grandmother sell balut, penoy, and other goods. He finished his high school education in Sorsogon. As a kid, he was very thin and was often bullied; as a way of escape, he focused his attention on basketball.

== College career ==
He decided to go to Manila and study at Philippine Christian University. He was recruited to play for the PCU Dolphins by the school's swimming coach while he was playing billiards with his friends. While at PCU, he, along with future PBA stars Gabby Espinas and Jayson Castro, helped the team win its first ever NCAA title against host school University of Perpetual Help Altas in 2004.

== Professional career ==
He was the seventh overall draft pick by Purefoods in 2008 before being traded to Burger King. He found his niche as a basketball player while playing for coach Yeng Guiao's Rain or Shine Elasto Painters, where he was known as one of the league's toughest players. While with Rain or Shine, he also became teammates with J.R. Quiñahan, and together they formed a duo in the low block, called the Extra Rice, Inc., owing to their weight and huge appetite.

On December 14, 2023, Belga signed a one-year contract extension with the Rain or Shine Elasto Painters.

On April 3, 2024, Belga made history to become the first Elasto Painters local player to record a triple-double of his career, as the Elasto Painters throw it back to their Welcoat Dragons jerseys days.

== PBA career statistics ==
Legend
GP	Games played	MPG	Minutes per game	FG%	Field-goal percentage
3FG%	3-point field-goal percentage	4P%	4-point field-goal percentage	FT%	Free-throw percentage
RPG	Rebounds per game	APG	Assists per game	SPG	Steals per game
BPG	Blocks per game	PPG	Points per game	127	Career high

As of the end of 2025–26 season

=== Season-by-season averages ===
Year	Team	GP	MPG	FG%	3P%	4P%	FT%	RPG	APG	SPG	BPG	PPG
2008–09	Purefoods	40	15.9	.537	.258	—	.535	4.0	.8	.5	.1	5.9
2008–09	Burger King	40	15.9	.537	.258	—	.535	4.0	.8	.5	.1	5.9
2009–10	Burger King / Air21	38	22.8	.426	.231	—	.702	6.3	1.2	.6	.6	7.9
2010–11	Meralco	41	20.1	.460	.290	—	.680	5.1	1.3	.3	.3	6.7
2010–11	Rain or Shine	41	20.1	.460	.290	—	.680	5.1	1.3	.3	.3	6.7
2011–12	Rain or Shine	53	22.0	.423	.247	—	.648	5.1	1.3	.5	.5	6.8
2012–13	Rain or Shine	57	22.3	.361	.247	—	.619	5.9	1.7	.6	.3	6.8
2013–14	Rain or Shine	59	22.4	.439	.295	—	.627	5.1	1.6	.6	.5	8.6
2014–15	Rain or Shine	53	19.9	.378	.231	—	.597	4.5	2.3	.6	.4	6.9
2015–16	Rain or Shine	54	20.4	.445	.289	—	.664	5.2	1.8	.5	.4	8.1
2016–17	Rain or Shine	38	21.9	.404	.333	—	.657	5.8	2.0	.4	.3	8.5
2017–18	Rain or Shine	37	22.1	.390	.321	—	.695	5.4	2.5	.5	.3	8.7
2019	Rain or Shine	48	24.8	.396	.249	—	.627	5.3	3.0	.6	.4	8.2
2020	Rain or Shine	12	26.1	.432	.319	—	.737	5.8	2.0	.6	.7	10.9
2021	Rain or Shine	23	24.6	.385	.280	—	.611	5.7	3.2	.6	.3	9.9
2022–23	Rain or Shine	33	22.0	.401	.272	—	.714	5.1	3.1	.4	.2	8.0
2023–24	Rain or Shine	29	26.2	.495	.379	—	.584	5.9	3.9	.9	.4	12.9
2024–25	Rain or Shine	38	11.7	.400	.317	.000	.818	2.8	1.5	.1	.2	4.6
2025–26	Rain or Shine	21	8.6	.281	.276	—	.667	2.3	1.0	.1	.1	2.2
Career		674	20.9	.417	.284	.000	.644	5.0	1.9	.5	.4	7.6

== National team career ==
In 2013, Belga was added to the Gilas Pilipinas training pool that competed in the 2013 FIBA Asia Championship, and was considered the "13th man", since he was the last man cut from the 12-man national team roster. In 2014, he was included in the Gilas roster that played for the 2014 FIBA Asia Cup in Wuhan, China, 2014 FIBA World Cup in Spain, and 2014 Asian Games in Incheon, South Korea. In 2018, he will represent the Rain or Shine-backed Gilas Pilipinas in the 2018 Asian Games in Jakarta, Indonesia.

== Sports commentating career ==
Belga covers NCAA basketball games as an analyst for GMA Network since 2022.
