= 2011–12 Barangay Ginebra Kings season =

- Head coach: Jong Uichico (October–December 2011); Siot Tanquincen
- General Manager: Samboy Lim
- Owner(s): Ginebra San Miguel, Inc. (a San Miguel Corporation subsidiary)

Philippine Cup results
- Record: 9–5 (64.3%)
- Place: 4th
- Playoff finish: Quarterfinalist (eliminated by Rain or Shine, 0–2)

Commissioner's Cup results
- Record: 6–3 (66.7%)
- Place: 2nd
- Playoff finish: Semifinalist (eliminated by B-Meg, 1–3)

Governors Cup results
- Record: 9–5 (64.3%)
- Place: 2nd
- Playoff finish: Semifinalist (lost to B-Meg in finals berth playoff)

Barangay Ginebra Kings seasons

The 2011–12 Barangay Ginebra Kings season was the 33rd season of the franchise in the Philippine Basketball Association (PBA).

== Key dates ==
- August 28: The 2011 PBA draft took place in Robinson's Place Ermita, Manila.

== Draft picks ==
Round	Pick	Player	Position	Nationality	College
1	9	Reil Cervantes	F	Philippines	Far Eastern University
2	18	James Martinez	G	Philippines	UE

== Roster ==
2011–12 Barangay Ginebra Kings roster
Players
Coaches

Pos.	#	POB	Name	Height	Weight	DOB (YYYY–MM–DD)	From
C	2	(Philippines)	Billy Mamaril	6 ft 5 in (1.96 m)	225 lb (102 kg)		Bakersfield
PG	5	(Philippines)	Robert Labagala	5 ft 9 in (1.75 m)	170 lb (77 kg)		UE
F	9	(Philippines)	Niño Canaleta	6 ft 6 in (1.98 m)	200 lb (91 kg)		UE
F	10	(Philippines)	Rico Maierhofer	6 ft 5 in (1.96 m)	180 lb (82 kg)		De La Salle
G	11	(United States)	Mike Cortez	6 ft 0 in (1.83 m)	180 lb (82 kg)		De La Salle
G	13	(Philippines)	Jayjay Helterbrand	5 ft 11 in (1.80 m)	170 lb (77 kg)		Kentucky State
F/C	14	(Philippines)	Enrico Villanueva	6 ft 5 in (1.96 m)	210 lb (95 kg)		Ateneo
F	18	(Philippines)	Allein Maliksi (R)	6 ft 4 in (1.93 m)	180 lb (82 kg)		UST
F/C	21	(Philippines)	Kerby Raymundo	6 ft 6 in (1.98 m)	215 lb (98 kg)		Letran
G/F	24	(Philippines)	John Wilson	6 ft 0 in (1.83 m)	185 lb (84 kg)		José Rizal
F	28	(United States)	Willy Wilson	6 ft 2 in (1.88 m)	200 lb (91 kg)		De La Salle
F/C	30	(United States)	Eric Menk (C)	6 ft 6 in (1.98 m)	220 lb (100 kg)		Lake Superior State
G/F	33	(Philippines)	Dylan Ababou (R)	6 ft 3 in (1.91 m)	185 lb (84 kg)		UST
SG	47	(Philippines)	Mark Caguioa	6 ft 0 in (1.83 m)	190 lb (86 kg)		Glendale CC (CA)
PF	99	(United States)	Rudy Hatfield	6 ft 3 in (1.91 m)	205 lb (93 kg)		UM–Dearborn
C	44	(United States)	Chris Alexander (CI)	7 ft 1 in (2.16 m)	240 lb (109 kg)		Iowa State
C	4	(United States)	Jackson Vroman (CI)	6 ft 10 in (2.08 m)	220 lb (100 kg)		Iowa State
F	1	(United States)	Cedric Bozeman (GI)	6 ft 6 in (1.98 m)	215 lb (98 kg)		UCLA

Head coach

- (Philippines) Siot Tanquingcen (UST)

Assistant coach(es)

- (Philippines) Allan Caidic (UE)
- (Philippines) Marco Januz Sauler (De La Salle)
- (Philippines) Art dela Cruz

Legend

- (C) Team captain
- (CI) Commissioner's Cup Import
- (GI) Governors' Cup Import
- (EI) EASL Import
- (DP) Unsigned draft pick
- (FA) Free agent
- (IN) Inactive
- (S) Suspended
- (R) Rookie
- Injured

== Philippine Cup ==
=== Eliminations ===
==== Standings ====
Pos	Team	W	L	PCT	GB	Qualification
1	B-Meg Llamados	10	4	.714 (Note: Head-to-head record: B-Meg 1–1 Talk 'N Text (B-Meg +8))	—	Twice-to-beat in the quarterfinals
2	Talk 'N Text Tropang Texters	10	4	.714	—	Twice-to-beat in the quarterfinals
3	Petron Blaze Boosters	9	5	.643 (Note: Head-to-head differential: Petron +8, Barangay Ginebra +1, Rain or Shine −9)	1	Best-of-three quarterfinals
4	Barangay Ginebra San Miguel	9	5	.643	1	Best-of-three quarterfinals
5	Rain or Shine Elasto Painters	9	5	.643	1	Best-of-three quarterfinals
6	Meralco Bolts	8	6	.571	2	Best-of-three quarterfinals
7	Barako Bull Energy Cola	6	8	.429 (Note: Head-to-head record: Barako Bull 1–1 Powerade (Barako Bull +35))	4	Twice-to-win in the quarterfinals
8	Powerade Tigers	6	8	.429	4	Twice-to-win in the quarterfinals
9	Alaska Aces	3	11	.214	7	
10	Shopinas.com Clickers	0	14	.000	10	

Source: PBA.ph

=== Bracket ===
Quarterfinals
(#1 twice-to-beat)
1	B-Meg	88	123
8	Powerade	97	131*
(Best-of-3)
4	Barangay Ginebra	0
5	Rain or Shine	2
(#2 twice-to-beat)
2	Talk 'N Text	81
7	Barako Bull	79
(Best-of-3)
3	Petron Blaze	2
6	Meralco	0

Semifinals (Best-of-7)
8	Powerade	4
5	Rain or Shine	3
2	Talk 'N Text	4
3	Petron Blaze	3

Finals (Best-of-7)
8	Powerade	1
2	Talk 'N Text	4

*Game went into overtime

=== Quarterfinals ===
==== Barangay Ginebra-Rain or Shine series ====
December 16

Barangay Ginebra Kings 105, Rain or Shine Elasto Painters 112 (OT)

Smart Araneta Coliseum, Quezon City

December 21

Barangay Ginebra Kings 91, Rain or Shine Elasto Painters 106
Rain or Shine wins series 2–0

Ynares Center, Antipolo

== Commissioner's Cup ==
=== Eliminations ===
==== Standings ====
Pos	Team	W	L	PCT	GB	Qualification
1	Talk 'N Text Tropang Texters	7	2	.778	—	Advance to semifinals
2	Barangay Ginebra Kings	6	3	.667 (Note: Second seed playoff: Barangay Ginebra 93–84 B-Meg)	1	Advance to semifinals
3	B-Meg Llamados	6	3	.667	1	Advance to quarterfinals
4	Alaska Aces	5	4	.556	2	Advance to quarterfinals
5	Barako Bull Energy Cola	4	5	.444 (Note: Head-to-head quotient: Barako Bull 1.04, Meralco 1.01, Powerade 0.95; sixth seed playoff: Meralco 102–98 Powerade)	3	Advance to quarterfinals
6	Meralco Bolts	4	5	.444	3	Advance to quarterfinals
7	Powerade Tigers	4	5	.444	3	
8	Rain or Shine Elasto Painters	3	6	.333 (Note: Head-to-head quotient: Rain or Shine 1.12, Petron 1.11, Air21 0.80)	4	
9	Petron Blaze Boosters	3	6	.333	4	
10	Air21 Express	3	6	.333	4	

Source: PBA.ph

==== Seeding playoffs ====
March 30

2nd seed

B-Meg Llamados 84, Barangay Ginebra Kings 93

Cuneta Astrodome, Pasay

=== Bracket ===
Quarterfinals (Best-of-3)
4	Alaska	1
5	Barako Bull	2
3	B-Meg	2
6	Meralco	1

Semifinals (Best-of-5)
1	Talk 'N Text	3
5	Barako Bull	2
2	Barangay Ginebra	1
3	B-Meg	3

Finals (Best-of-7)
1	Talk 'N Text	3
3	B-Meg	4

=== Semifinals ===
==== Barangay Ginebra–B-Meg series ====
April 11

Barangay Ginebra Kings 67, B-Meg Llamados 82

Ynares Center, Antipolo

April 13

Barangay Ginebra Kings 77, B-Meg Llamados 83

Smart Araneta Coliseum, Quezon City

April 15

Barangay Ginebra Kings 88, B-Meg Llamados 79

Cuneta Astrodome, Pasay

April 17

Barangay Ginebra Kings 84, B-Meg Llamados 108
B-Meg wins series, 3–1

Smart Araneta Coliseum, Quezon City

== Governors' Cup ==
=== Eliminations ===
==== Standings ====
Pos	Team	W	L	PCT	GB	Qualification
1	Rain or Shine Elasto Painters	8	1	.889	—	Semifinal round
2	B-Meg Llamados	6	3	.667	2	Semifinal round
3	Talk 'N Text Tropang Texters	5	4	.556 (Note: Head-to-head differential: Talk 'N Text +18, Barangay Ginebra 0, Petron −18)	3	Semifinal round
4	Barangay Ginebra Kings	5	4	.556	3	Semifinal round
5	Petron Blaze Boosters	5	4	.556	3	Semifinal round
6	Meralco Bolts	4	5	.444 (Note: Head-to-head differential: Meralco +11, Barako Bull +8, Powerade −18; sixth seed playoffs: Powerade 99–95 Barako Bull, Meralco 94–86 Powerade)	4	Semifinal round
7	Powerade Tigers	4	5	.444	4	
8	Barako Bull Energy Cola	4	5	.444	4	
9	Alaska Aces	2	7	.222 (Note: Head-to-head record: Alaska 1–0 Air21)	6	
10	Air21 Express	2	7	.222	6	

Source: PBA.ph

=== Semifinals ===
==== Standings ====
Overall standings
Pos	Team	W	L	PCT	GB	Qualification
1	Rain or Shine Elasto Painters	10	4	.714	—	Advance to finals (Note: If a team outside the top two teams wins four semifinal round games, then it and the second-placed team will playoff for the last finals berth; otherwise, the top 2 teams qualify outright.)
2	B-Meg Llamados	9	5	.643 (Note: Head-to-head record: B-Meg 2–0 Barangay Ginebra)	1	Guaranteed finals berth playoff
3	Barangay Ginebra Kings	9	5	.643	1	Qualify to finals berth playoff
4	Talk 'N Text Tropang Texters	8	6	.571	2	
5	Petron Blaze Boosters	6	8	.429 (Note: Head-to-head record: Meralco 1–1, Petron; Petron +12, Meralco −12)	4	
6	Meralco Bolts	6	8	.429	4	

Source: PBA.ph
Notes:

Semifinal round standings
Pos	Team	W	L	Qualification
1	Barangay Ginebra Kings	4	1	Qualify to finals berth playoff (Note: Finals berth playoff: B-Meg 74–72 Barangay Ginebra)
2	B-Meg Llamados	3	2	
3	Talk 'N Text Tropang Texters	3	2	
4	Rain or Shine Elasto Painters	2	3	
5	Meralco Bolts	2	3	
6	Petron Blaze Boosters	1	4	

Source: PBA.ph

===== Finals berth playoff =====
July 20

B-Meg Llamados 74, Barangay Ginebra Kings 72

Smart Araneta Coliseum, Quezon City

== Transactions ==
=== Trades ===
==== Philippine Cup ====
November 16, 2011	To Barangay Ginebra Rico Maierhofer (from B-Meg); Allein Maliksi (from Barako Bull)	To Barako Bull Jimbo Aquino (from Barangay Ginebra); 2013 1st round pick (from Barangay Ginebra)	To B-Meg Yancy de Ocampo (from Barangay Ginebra); 2012 2nd round pick (from Barangay Ginebra)

January 27, 2012	To Barangay Ginebra Kerby Raymundo (from B-Meg); Dylan Ababou (from Barako Bull)	To B-Meg JC Intal (from Ginebra); 2012 2nd round pick (from Barako Bull)	To Barako Bull Ronald Tubid (from Ginebra); Reil Cervantes (from Ginebra); 2014 2nd round draft pick (from Ginebra)

=== Additions ===
Player	Signed	Former team
Rico Maierhofer	November 16, 2011(via trade)	B-Meg Llamados
Allein Maliksi	November 16, 2011(via trade)	Barako Bull Energy
Kerby Raymundo	January 27, 2012(via trade)	B-Meg Llamados
Dylan Ababou	January 27, 2012(via trade)	Barako Bull Energy

=== Subtractions ===
Player	Signed	New team
Jimbo Aquino	November 16, 2011(via trade)	Barako Bull Energy
Yancy De Ocampo	November 16, 2011(via trade)	B-Meg Llamados
JC Intal	January 27, 2012(via trade)	B-Meg Llamados
Ronald Tubid	January 27, 2012(via trade)	Barako Bull Energy
Reil Cervantes	January 27, 2012(via trade)	Barako Bull Energy

=== Recruited imports ===
Tournament	Name	Debuted	Last game	Record
Commissioner's Cup	Chris Alexander	February 12 (vs. Petron Blaze)	February 24 (vs. Rain or Shine)	2–1
Commissioner's Cup	Jackson Vroman	March 4 (vs. Powerade)	April 17 (vs. B-Meg)	6–5
Governors Cup	Cedric Bozeman	May 23 (vs. Air21)	July 20 (vs. B-Meg)	9-6
