= 2011–12 Barako Bull Energy season =

- Head coach: Junel Baculi
- Owner(s): Energy Food and Drinks Inc. (a Lina Group of Companies subsidiary)

Philippine Cup results
- Record: 6–8 (42.9%)
- Place: 7th
- Playoff finish: Quarterfinalist (eliminated by Talk 'N Text in one game)

Commissioner's Cup results
- Record: 4–5 (44.4%)
- Place: 5th
- Playoff finish: Semifinalist (eliminated by Talk 'N Text, 2–3)

Governors Cup results
- Record: 4–5 (44.4%)
- Place: did not qualify (lost to Powerade in 1st seeding playoff)
- Playoff finish: Eliminated

Barako Bull Energy seasons

The 2011–12 Barako Bull Energy was the 10th season of the franchise in the Philippine Basketball Association (PBA). The team was previously known as the Air21 Express during the 2010–11 season.

== Key dates ==
- August 28: The 2011 PBA Draft took place in Robinson's Place Ermita, Manila.

== Draft picks ==
Round	Pick	Player	Position	Nationality	College
1	8	Allein Maliksi	G/F	Philippines	UST
1	10	Dylan Ababou	G/F	Philippines	UST
2	19	Kenneth Acibar	F	Philippines	UE
2	20	Paul Sorongan	G	Philippines	UP Diliman

== Roster ==
2011–12 Barako Bull Energy roster
Players
Coaches

Pos.	#	POB	Name	Height	Weight	DOB (YYYY–MM–DD)	From
PG	1	(Philippines)	Celino Cruz	5 ft 9 in (1.75 m)	170 lb (77 kg)		Far Eastern
PG	3	(Philippines)	Lou Gatumbato	5 ft 9 in (1.75 m)	170 lb (77 kg)		St. Benilde
G/F	4	(Philippines)	Marc Agustin (IN)	6 ft 4 in (1.93 m)	205 lb (93 kg)		Adamson
F/C	8	(Philippines)	Don Allado (S)	6 ft 6 in (1.98 m)	220 lb (100 kg)		De La Salle
PF	10	(Philippines)	Reil Cervantes (R)	6 ft 4 in (1.93 m)	210 lb (95 kg)		Far Eastern
G	11	(Philippines)	Willie Miller	5 ft 11 in (1.80 m)	180 lb (82 kg)		Letran
G/F	13	(Philippines)	Jimbo Aquino	6 ft 1 in (1.85 m)	180 lb (82 kg)		San Sebastian
SF	14	(Philippines)	Leo Najorda	6 ft 2 in (1.88 m)	190 lb (86 kg)		San Sebastian
F/C	18	(Philippines)	Doug Kramer	6 ft 5 in (1.96 m)	210 lb (95 kg)		Ateneo
PG	19	(Philippines)	Al Vergara	5 ft 8 in (1.73 m)	165 lb (75 kg)		Saint Francis of Assisi
G	22	(United States)	Shawn Weinstein	6 ft 1 in (1.85 m)	180 lb (82 kg)		St. Edward's
G	26	(Philippines)	Paul Sorongan (R)	6 ft 4 in (1.93 m)	178 lb (81 kg)		UP Diliman
F/C	34	(Philippines)	Carlo Sharma	6 ft 6 in (1.98 m)	220 lb (100 kg)		De La Salle
F	42	(United States)	Danny Seigle (injured)	6 ft 6 in (1.98 m)	205 lb (93 kg)		Wagner
G/F	71	(Philippines)	Ronald Tubid	6 ft 1 in (1.85 m)	185 lb (84 kg)		UE
F	80	(Philippines)	Sunday Salvacion	6 ft 3 in (1.91 m)	190 lb (86 kg)		St. Benilde
F/C	88	(Australia)	Mick Pennisi	6 ft 9 in (2.06 m)	235 lb (107 kg)		Eastern Michigan

Head coach

- (Philippines) Junel Baculi (Mapúa)

Assistant coach(es)

- (Philippines) Bong Ramos (Mapúa)
- (Philippines) Leo Angelo Pujante

Legend

- (C) Team captain
- (CI) Commissioner's Cup Import
- (GI) Governors' Cup Import
- (EI) EASL Import
- (DP) Unsigned draft pick
- (FA) Free agent
- (IN) Inactive
- (S) Suspended
- (R) Rookie
- Injured

== Philippine Cup ==
=== Eliminations ===
==== Standings ====
Pos	Team	W	L	PCT	GB	Qualification
1	B-Meg Llamados	10	4	.714 (Note: Head-to-head record: B-Meg 1–1 Talk 'N Text (B-Meg +8))	—	Twice-to-beat in the quarterfinals
2	Talk 'N Text Tropang Texters	10	4	.714	—	Twice-to-beat in the quarterfinals
3	Petron Blaze Boosters	9	5	.643 (Note: Head-to-head differential: Petron +8, Barangay Ginebra +1, Rain or Shine −9)	1	Best-of-three quarterfinals
4	Barangay Ginebra San Miguel	9	5	.643	1	Best-of-three quarterfinals
5	Rain or Shine Elasto Painters	9	5	.643	1	Best-of-three quarterfinals
6	Meralco Bolts	8	6	.571	2	Best-of-three quarterfinals
7	Barako Bull Energy Cola	6	8	.429 (Note: Head-to-head record: Barako Bull 1–1 Powerade (Barako Bull +35))	4	Twice-to-win in the quarterfinals
8	Powerade Tigers	6	8	.429	4	Twice-to-win in the quarterfinals
9	Alaska Aces	3	11	.214	7	
10	Shopinas.com Clickers	0	14	.000	10	

Source: PBA.ph

=== Bracket ===
Quarterfinals
(#1 twice-to-beat)
1	B-Meg	88	123
8	Powerade	97	131*
(Best-of-3)
4	Barangay Ginebra	0
5	Rain or Shine	2
(#2 twice-to-beat)
2	Talk 'N Text	81
7	Barako Bull	79
(Best-of-3)
3	Petron Blaze	2
6	Meralco	0

Semifinals (Best-of-7)
8	Powerade	4
5	Rain or Shine	3
2	Talk 'N Text	4
3	Petron Blaze	3

Finals (Best-of-7)
8	Powerade	1
2	Talk 'N Text	4

*Game went into overtime

=== Quarterfinals ===
==== Talk 'N Text vs. Barako Bull ====
December 14

Talk 'N Text Tropang Texters 81, Barako Bull Energy 79
Talk 'N Text wins series in one game

Smart Araneta Coliseum, Quezon City

== Commissioner's Cup ==
=== Eliminations ===
==== Standings ====
Pos	Team	W	L	PCT	GB	Qualification
1	Talk 'N Text Tropang Texters	7	2	.778	—	Advance to semifinals
2	Barangay Ginebra Kings	6	3	.667 (Note: Second seed playoff: Barangay Ginebra 93–84 B-Meg)	1	Advance to semifinals
3	B-Meg Llamados	6	3	.667	1	Advance to quarterfinals
4	Alaska Aces	5	4	.556	2	Advance to quarterfinals
5	Barako Bull Energy Cola	4	5	.444 (Note: Head-to-head quotient: Barako Bull 1.04, Meralco 1.01, Powerade 0.95; sixth seed playoff: Meralco 102–98 Powerade)	3	Advance to quarterfinals
6	Meralco Bolts	4	5	.444	3	Advance to quarterfinals
7	Powerade Tigers	4	5	.444	3	
8	Rain or Shine Elasto Painters	3	6	.333 (Note: Head-to-head quotient: Rain or Shine 1.12, Petron 1.11, Air21 0.80)	4	
9	Petron Blaze Boosters	3	6	.333	4	
10	Air21 Express	3	6	.333	4	

Source: PBA.ph

=== Bracket ===
Quarterfinals (Best-of-3)
4	Alaska	1
5	Barako Bull	2
3	B-Meg	2
6	Meralco	1

Semifinals (Best-of-5)
1	Talk 'N Text	3
5	Barako Bull	2
2	Barangay Ginebra	1
3	B-Meg	3

Finals (Best-of-7)
1	Talk 'N Text	3
3	B-Meg	4

=== Quarterfinals ===
==== Alaska–Barako Bull series ====
April 1

Alaska Aces 90, Barako Bull Energy 103

Smart Araneta Coliseum, Quezon City

April 4

Alaska Aces 99, Barako Bull Energy 92

Smart Araneta Coliseum, Quezon City

April 8

Alaska Aces 85, Barako Bull Energy 106
Barako Bull wins series, 2–1

Smart Araneta Coliseum, Quezon City

=== Semifinals ===
==== Talk 'N Text–Barako Bull series ====
April 10

Talk 'N Text Tropang Texters 77, Barako Bull Energy 84

Ynares Center, Antipolo

April 12

Talk 'N Text Tropang Texters 123, Barako Bull Energy 98

Ynares Center, Antipolo

April 14

Talk 'N Text Tropang Texters 81, Barako Bull Energy 85

Cuneta Astrodome, Pasay

April 16

Talk 'N Text Tropang Texters 108, Barako Bull Energy 90

Smart Araneta Coliseum, Quezon City

April 18

Talk 'N Text Tropang Texters 101, Barako Bull Energy 90
Talk 'N Text wins series, 3-2

Smart Araneta Coliseum, Quezon City

== Governors Cup ==
=== Eliminations ===
==== Standings ====
Pos	Team	W	L	PCT	GB	Qualification
1	Rain or Shine Elasto Painters	8	1	.889	—	Semifinal round
2	B-Meg Llamados	6	3	.667	2	Semifinal round
3	Talk 'N Text Tropang Texters	5	4	.556 (Note: Head-to-head differential: Talk 'N Text +18, Barangay Ginebra 0, Petron −18)	3	Semifinal round
4	Barangay Ginebra Kings	5	4	.556	3	Semifinal round
5	Petron Blaze Boosters	5	4	.556	3	Semifinal round
6	Meralco Bolts	4	5	.444 (Note: Head-to-head differential: Meralco +11, Barako Bull +8, Powerade −18; sixth seed playoffs: Powerade 99–95 Barako Bull, Meralco 94–86 Powerade)	4	Semifinal round
7	Powerade Tigers	4	5	.444	4	
8	Barako Bull Energy Cola	4	5	.444	4	
9	Alaska Aces	2	7	.222 (Note: Head-to-head record: Alaska 1–0 Air21)	6	
10	Air21 Express	2	7	.222	6	

Source: PBA.ph

==== 6th-seed playoffs ====
July 3

KO game

Barako Bull Energy 95, Powerade Tigers 99

Smart Araneta Coliseum, Quezon City

== Transactions ==
=== Pre-season ===
==== Trades ====
August 28, 2011	To Barako Bull 2011 1st round pick (Dylan Ababou); Mick Pennisi; Sunday Salvacion future draft picks	To Petron Blaze 2011 1st round pick (Chris Lutz); Dondon Hontiveros; Carlo Sharma

September 6, 2011	To Barako Bull Don Allado (from B-Meg) future second round pick (from B-Meg)	To B-Meg Mark Barroca (from Shopinas.com)	To Shopinas.com Elmer Espiritu(from Barako Bull); Brian Ilad (from B-Meg)

=== Philippine Cup ===
==== Trades ====
November 16, 2011	To Barako Bull Jimbo Aquino (from Barangay Ginebra); 2012 2nd round pick (from Barangay Ginebra); 2013 1st round pick (from Barangay Ginebra)	To Barangay Ginebra Rico Maierhofer (from B-Meg); Allein Maliksi (from Barako Bull)	To B-Meg Yancy de Ocampo (from Barangay Ginebra); 2012 2nd round pick (from Barako Bull)

January 27, 2012	To Barako Bull Ronald Tubid (from Ginebra); Reil Cervantes (from Ginebra); 2014 2nd round draft pick (from Ginebra)	To B-Meg JC Intal (from Ginebra); 2012 2nd round pick (from Barako Bull)	To Barangay Ginebra Kerby Raymundo (from B-Meg); Dylan Ababou (from Barako Bull)

=== Commissioner's Cup ===
==== Trades ====
March 20, 2012	To Barako Bull Marc Agustin	To Petron Chico Lanete

May 1, 2012	To Barako Bull Doug Kramer	To Powerade Jondan Salvador; 2012 second round pick

May 1, 2012	To Barako Bull Celino Cruz; Carlo Sharma	To Petron Blaze Dorian Pena

=== Additions ===
Player	Signed	Former team
Jimbo Aquino	November 16, 2011(via trade)	Barangay Ginebra Kings
Reil Cervantes	January 27, 2012(via trade)	Barangay Ginebra Kings
Ronald Tubid	January 27, 2012(via trade)	Barangay Ginebra Kings
Shawn Weinstein	February 1, 2012	Talk 'N Text Tropang Texters
Marc Agustin	March 20, 2012(via trade)	Petron Blaze Boosters
Doug Kramer	May 1, 2012(via trade)	Powerade Tigers
Celino Cruz	May 1, 2012(via trade)	Powerade Tigers via Petron Blaze Boosters
Carlo Sharma	May 1, 2012(via trade)	Petron Blaze Boosters

=== Subtractions ===
Player	Signed	New team
Allein Maliksi	November 16, 2011(via trade)	Barangay Ginebra Kings
Dylan Ababou	January 27, 2012(via trade)	Barangay Ginebra Kings
Paul Artadi	February 1, 2012	Meralco Bolts
Chico Lanete	March 20, 2012(via trade)	Petron Blaze Boosters
Jondan Salvador	May 1, 2012(via trade)	Powerade Tigers
Dorian Pena	May 1, 2012(via trade)	Petron Blaze Boosters
Wynne Arboleda	–	waived

=== Recruited imports ===
Tournament	Name	Debuted	Last game	Record
Commissioner's Cup	DerMarr Johnson	February 10 (vs. Alaska)	February 23 (vs. Rain or Shine)	1–3
Commissioner's Cup	Rodney White	March 2 (vs. Powerade)	March 25 (vs. Barangay Ginebra)	3-2
Commissioner's Cup	Reggie Okosa	April 1 (vs. Alaska)	April 1 (vs. Alaska)	1–0
Commissioner's Cup	Gabe Freeman	April 4 (vs. Alaska)	April 18 (vs. Talk 'N Text)	3–4
Governors Cup	Jamine Peterson	May 25 (vs. Powerade)	June 1 (vs. B-Meg)	1–2
Governors Cup	LeRoy Hickerson	June 8 (vs. Petron Blaze)	July 3 (vs. Powerade)	3–4
