= 2011–12 B-Meg Llamados season =

- Head coach: Tim Cone
- General manager: Alvin Patrimonio
- Owners: San Miguel Pure Foods Co., Inc. (a San Miguel Corporation subsidiary)

Philippine Cup results
- Record: 10–4 (71.4%)
- Place: 1st
- Playoff finish: Quarterfinalist (eliminated by Powerade in two games)

Commissioner's Cup results
- Record: 6–3 (66.7%)
- Place: 3rd
- Playoff finish: Champions (def. Talk 'N Text, 4-3)

Governors Cup results
- Record: 9–5 (64.3%)
- Place: 2nd
- Playoff finish: Runner-up (def by. Rain or Shine, 4-3)

B-Meg Llamados seasons

The 2011–12 B-Meg Llamados season was the 24th season of the franchise in the Philippine Basketball Association (PBA).

== Key dates ==
- August 28: The 2011 PBA Draft took place in Robinson's Place Ermita, Manila.

== Draft picks ==
Round	Pick	Player	Position	Nationality	College
2	16	Brian Ilad	C	Philippines	De La Salle

== Roster ==
2011–12 B-Meg Llamados roster
Players

Pos.	#	POB	Name	Height	Weight	DOB (YYYY–MM–DD)	From
PG	2	(United States)	Urbiztondo, Joshua	6 ft 1 in (1.85 m)	185 lb (84 kg)		Fresno Pacific
G	3	(Philippines)	Jonas Villanueva	5 ft 11 in (1.80 m)	170 lb (77 kg)		Far Eastern
C	4	(United States)	Rafi Reavis	6 ft 8 in (2.03 m)	205 lb (93 kg)		Coppin State
G/F	6	(Philippines)	Val Acuña	6 ft 4 in (1.93 m)	179 lb (81 kg)		UE
SF	7	(Philippines)	JC Intal	6 ft 4 in (1.93 m)	195 lb (88 kg)		Ateneo
G	8	(Philippines)	Peter June Simon	6 ft 1 in (1.85 m)	180 lb (82 kg)		Mindanao
PG	14	(Philippines)	Mark Barroca (R)	5 ft 10 in (1.78 m)	170 lb (77 kg)		Far Eastern
F	15	(Philippines)	Marc Pingris	6 ft 6 in (1.98 m)	210 lb (95 kg)		PSBA
G	17	(Philippines)	Chris Tiu	5 ft 11 in (1.80 m)	175 lb (79 kg)		Ateneo
G/F	18	(Philippines)	James Yap (C)	6 ft 3 in (1.91 m)	205 lb (93 kg)		UE
PF	19	(Philippines)	Jerwin Gaco	6 ft 4 in (1.93 m)	180 lb (82 kg)		De La Salle
F	25	(Philippines)	Ken Bono	6 ft 4 in (1.93 m)	220 lb (100 kg)		Adamson
F	38	(United States)	Joe Devance	6 ft 7 in (2.01 m)	215 lb (98 kg)		UTEP
PF	63	(Switzerland)	Mike Burtscher	6 ft 6 in (1.98 m)	210 lb (95 kg)		Clearwater Christian
F/C	95	(Philippines)	Yancy De Ocampo	6 ft 9 in (2.06 m)	220 lb (100 kg)		Saint Francis of Assisi

Coaches

Head coach

- (United States) Tim Cone (George Washington)

Assistant coach(es)

- (Philippines) Richard del Rosario (De La Salle)
- (Philippines) Koy Banal (Mapúa)
- (Philippines) Johnny Abarrientos (Far Eastern)
- (United States) Jeffrey Cariaso (Sonoma State)
- (Philippines) Dayong Mendoza

Legend

- (C) Team captain
- Injured

== Philippine Cup ==
=== Eliminations ===
==== Standings ====
Pos	Team	W	L	PCT	GB	Qualification
1	B-Meg Llamados	10	4	.714 (Note: Head-to-head record: B-Meg 1–1 Talk 'N Text (B-Meg +8))	—	Twice-to-beat in the quarterfinals
2	Talk 'N Text Tropang Texters	10	4	.714	—	Twice-to-beat in the quarterfinals
3	Petron Blaze Boosters	9	5	.643 (Note: Head-to-head differential: Petron +8, Barangay Ginebra +1, Rain or Shine −9)	1	Best-of-three quarterfinals
4	Barangay Ginebra San Miguel	9	5	.643	1	Best-of-three quarterfinals
5	Rain or Shine Elasto Painters	9	5	.643	1	Best-of-three quarterfinals
6	Meralco Bolts	8	6	.571	2	Best-of-three quarterfinals
7	Barako Bull Energy Cola	6	8	.429 (Note: Head-to-head record: Barako Bull 1–1 Powerade (Barako Bull +35))	4	Twice-to-win in the quarterfinals
8	Powerade Tigers	6	8	.429	4	Twice-to-win in the quarterfinals
9	Alaska Aces	3	11	.214	7	
10	Shopinas.com Clickers	0	14	.000	10	

Source: PBA.ph

=== Bracket ===
Quarterfinals
(#1 twice-to-beat)
1	B-Meg	88	123
8	Powerade	97	131*
(Best-of-3)
4	Barangay Ginebra	0
5	Rain or Shine	2
(#2 twice-to-beat)
2	Talk 'N Text	81
7	Barako Bull	79
(Best-of-3)
3	Petron Blaze	2
6	Meralco	0

Semifinals (Best-of-7)
8	Powerade	4
5	Rain or Shine	3
2	Talk 'N Text	4
3	Petron Blaze	3

Finals (Best-of-7)
8	Powerade	1
2	Talk 'N Text	4

*Game went into overtime

=== Quarterfinals ===
==== B-Meg vs. Powerade ====
December 14

B-Meg Llamados 88, Powerade Tigers 97

Smart Araneta Coliseum, Quezon City

December 18

B-Meg Llamados 123, Powerade Tigers 131 (OT)
Powerade wins series in two games

Smart Araneta Coliseum, Quezon City

== Commissioner's Cup ==
=== Eliminations ===
==== Standings ====
Pos	Team	W	L	PCT	GB	Qualification
1	Talk 'N Text Tropang Texters	7	2	.778	—	Advance to semifinals
2	Barangay Ginebra Kings	6	3	.667 (Note: Second seed playoff: Barangay Ginebra 93–84 B-Meg)	1	Advance to semifinals
3	B-Meg Llamados	6	3	.667	1	Advance to quarterfinals
4	Alaska Aces	5	4	.556	2	Advance to quarterfinals
5	Barako Bull Energy Cola	4	5	.444 (Note: Head-to-head quotient: Barako Bull 1.04, Meralco 1.01, Powerade 0.95; sixth seed playoff: Meralco 102–98 Powerade)	3	Advance to quarterfinals
6	Meralco Bolts	4	5	.444	3	Advance to quarterfinals
7	Powerade Tigers	4	5	.444	3	
8	Rain or Shine Elasto Painters	3	6	.333 (Note: Head-to-head quotient: Rain or Shine 1.12, Petron 1.11, Air21 0.80)	4	
9	Petron Blaze Boosters	3	6	.333	4	
10	Air21 Express	3	6	.333	4	

Source: PBA.ph

==== Seeding playoffs ====
March 30

2nd seed

B-Meg Llamados 84, Barangay Ginebra Kings 93

Cuneta Astrodome, Pasay

=== Bracket ===
Quarterfinals (Best-of-3)
4	Alaska	1
5	Barako Bull	2
3	B-Meg	2
6	Meralco	1

Semifinals (Best-of-5)
1	Talk 'N Text	3
5	Barako Bull	2
2	Barangay Ginebra	1
3	B-Meg	3

Finals (Best-of-7)
1	Talk 'N Text	3
3	B-Meg	4

=== Quarterfinals ===
==== B-Meg–Meralco series ====
April 1

B-Meg Llamados 81, Meralco Bolts 103

Smart Araneta Coliseum, Quezon City

April 4

B-Meg Llamados 95, Meralco Bolts 85

Smart Araneta Coliseum, Quezon City

April 8

B-Meg Llamados 86, Meralco Bolts 76
B-Meg wins series, 2–1

Smart Araneta Coliseum, Quezon City

=== Semifinals ===
==== Barangay Ginebra–B-Meg series ====
April 11

Barangay Ginebra Kings 67, B-Meg Llamados 82

Ynares Center, Antipolo

April 13

Barangay Ginebra Kings 77, B-Meg Llamados 83

Smart Araneta Coliseum, Quezon City

April 15

Barangay Ginebra Kings 88, B-Meg Llamados 79

Cuneta Astrodome, Pasay

April 17

Barangay Ginebra Kings 84, B-Meg Llamados 108
B-Meg wins series, 3–1

Smart Araneta Coliseum, Quezon City

=== Finals ===
April 23

Talk 'N Text Tropang Texters 82, B-Meg Llamados 88

Smart Araneta Coliseum, Quezon City

April 25

Talk 'N Text Tropang Texters 104, B-Meg Llamados 102

Smart Araneta Coliseum, Quezon City

April 27

Talk 'N Text Tropang Texters 87, B-Meg Llamados 91

Smart Araneta Coliseum, Quezon City

April 29

Talk 'N Text Tropang Texters 100, B-Meg Llamados 85

Smart Araneta Coliseum, Quezon City

May 2

Talk 'N Text Tropang Texters 66, B-Meg Llamados 82

Smart Araneta Coliseum, Quezon City

May 4

Talk 'N Text Tropang Texters 92, B-Meg Llamados 82

Smart Araneta Coliseum, Quezon City

May 6

Talk 'N Text Tropang Texters 84, B-Meg Llamados 90 (OT)
B-Meg wins series, 4-3

Smart Araneta Coliseum, Quezon City

== Governors Cup ==
=== Eliminations ===
==== Standings ====
Pos	Team	W	L	PCT	GB	Qualification
1	Rain or Shine Elasto Painters	8	1	.889	—	Semifinal round
2	B-Meg Llamados	6	3	.667	2	Semifinal round
3	Talk 'N Text Tropang Texters	5	4	.556 (Note: Head-to-head differential: Talk 'N Text +18, Barangay Ginebra 0, Petron −18)	3	Semifinal round
4	Barangay Ginebra Kings	5	4	.556	3	Semifinal round
5	Petron Blaze Boosters	5	4	.556	3	Semifinal round
6	Meralco Bolts	4	5	.444 (Note: Head-to-head differential: Meralco +11, Barako Bull +8, Powerade −18; sixth seed playoffs: Powerade 99–95 Barako Bull, Meralco 94–86 Powerade)	4	Semifinal round
7	Powerade Tigers	4	5	.444	4	
8	Barako Bull Energy Cola	4	5	.444	4	
9	Alaska Aces	2	7	.222 (Note: Head-to-head record: Alaska 1–0 Air21)	6	
10	Air21 Express	2	7	.222	6	

Source: PBA.ph

=== Semifinals ===
==== Standings ====
Overall standings
Pos	Team	W	L	PCT	GB	Qualification
1	Rain or Shine Elasto Painters	10	4	.714	—	Advance to finals (Note: If a team outside the top two teams wins four semifinal round games, then it and the second-placed team will playoff for the last finals berth; otherwise, the top 2 teams qualify outright.)
2	B-Meg Llamados	9	5	.643 (Note: Head-to-head record: B-Meg 2–0 Barangay Ginebra)	1	Guaranteed finals berth playoff
3	Barangay Ginebra Kings	9	5	.643	1	Qualify to finals berth playoff
4	Talk 'N Text Tropang Texters	8	6	.571	2	
5	Petron Blaze Boosters	6	8	.429 (Note: Head-to-head record: Meralco 1–1, Petron; Petron +12, Meralco −12)	4	
6	Meralco Bolts	6	8	.429	4	

Source: PBA.ph
Notes:

Semifinal round standings
Pos	Team	W	L	Qualification
1	Barangay Ginebra Kings	4	1	Qualify to finals berth playoff (Note: Finals berth playoff: B-Meg 74–72 Barangay Ginebra)
2	B-Meg Llamados	3	2	
3	Talk 'N Text Tropang Texters	3	2	
4	Rain or Shine Elasto Painters	2	3	
5	Meralco Bolts	2	3	
6	Petron Blaze Boosters	1	4	

Source: PBA.ph

==== Finals-berth playoff ====
July 20

B-Meg Llamados 74, Barangay Ginebra Kings 72

Smart Araneta Coliseum, Quezon City

=== Finals ===
July 22

Rain or Shine Elasto Painters 91, B-Meg Llamados 80

Smart Araneta Coliseum, Quezon City

July 25

Rain or Shine Elasto Painters 80, B-Meg Llamados 85

Smart Araneta Coliseum, Quezon City

July 27

Rain or Shine Elasto Painters 93, B-Meg Llamados 84

Smart Araneta Coliseum, Quezon City

July 29

Rain or Shine Elasto Painters 94, B-Meg Llamados 89

Smart Araneta Coliseum, Quezon City

August 1

Rain or Shine Elasto Painters 81, B-Meg Llamados 91

Smart Araneta Coliseum, Quezon City

August 3

Rain or Shine Elasto Painters 81, B-Meg Llamados 97

Smart Araneta Coliseum, Quezon City

August 5

Rain or Shine Elasto Painters 83, B-Meg Llamados 76
Rain or Shine wins series, 4-3

Smart Araneta Coliseum, Quezon City

== Transactions ==
=== Trades ===
==== Pre-season ====
September 6, 2011	To B-Meg Mark Barroca (from Shopinas.com)	To Barako Bull Don Allado (from B-Meg) future second round pick (from B-Meg)	To Shopinas.com Elmer Espiritu(from Barako Bull); Brian Ilad (from B-Meg)

==== Philippine Cup ====
November 16, 2011	To B-Meg Yancy de Ocampo (from Barangay Ginebra); 2012 2nd round pick (from Barako Bull)	To Barangay Ginebra Rico Maierhofer (from B-Meg); Allein Maliksi (from Barako Bull)	To Barako Bull Jimbo Aquino (from Barangay Ginebra); 2012 2nd round pick (from Barangay Ginebra); 2013 1st round pick (from Barangay Ginebra)

January 27, 2012	To B-Meg JC Intal (from Ginebra); 2012 2nd round pick (from Barako Bull)	To Barako Bull Ronald Tubid (from Ginebra); Reil Cervantes (from Ginebra); 2014 2nd round draft pick (from Ginebra)	To Barangay Ginebra Kerby Raymundo (from B-Meg); Dylan Ababou (from Barako Bull)

=== Additions ===
Player	Signed	Former team
Yancy De Ocampo	November 16, 2011(via trade)	Barangay Ginebra Kings
JC Intal	January 27, 2012(via trade)	Barangay Ginebra Kings
Ken Bono	May 20, 2012	Free agent

=== Subtractions ===
Player	Signed	New team
Rico Maierhofer	November 16, 2011(via trade)	Barangay Ginebra Kings
Kerby Raymundo	January 27, 2012(via trade)	Barangay Ginebra Kings

=== Recruited imports ===
Tournament	Name	Debuted	Last game	Record
Commissioner's Cup	Denzel Bowles	February 10 (vs. Meralco)	May 6 (vs. Talk 'N Text)	15–9
Governors Cup	Marqus Blakely	May 25 (vs. Rain or Shine)		5-3
