= Junel Baculi =

Filipino basketball coach

Commissioner of the UAAP 81st season
- In office August 28, 2018 – August 6, 2019
- Preceded by: Rebo Saguisag
- Succeeded by: Jensen Ilagan
- Basketball career

Career information
- College: Mapúa
- PBA draft: 1989: Undrafted
- Coaching career: 1994–2013

Career history

Coaching
- 1994–2002; 2003–2009: Lizealiz/Hapee/Hapee-PCU (PBL)
- 1998: Negros Slashers
- 1999–2002: Welcoat (PBL)
- 2002: Olongapo Volunteers
- 2005–2006: PCU
- 2009: Burger King Whoppers (assistant)
- 2010–2011: Barako Bull Energy Boosters
- 2011–2012: Barako Bull Energy
- 2013: GlobalPort Batang Pier

Career highlights
- 4x PBL champion (1998–1999 Challenge, 1999–2000 2nd Challenge, 1999–2000 Chairman's, 2000–2001 Chairman's)
Medals
Men's basketball
Head coach for Philippines
SEA Games
Gold medal – first place	2007 Nakhon Ratchasima	Team

Edmundo "Junel" Baculi is a Filipino head basketball coach who formerly coached GlobalPort Batang Pier in the PBA. In the PBL, he also coached the Hapee-PCU Dolphins and had many titles. Prior to coaching, Baculi played varsity basketball for the Mapua Cardinals.

He coached the Philippines national basketball team that participated at the 2007 Southeast Asian Games guiding the team to a gold medal finish. He is currently the basketball commissioner for the incoming UAAP Season 81.

== Coaching career ==
=== PBA ===
Baculi was hired as head coach of Barako Bull Energy Boosters for the 2010 Fiesta Conference. He then coached the team until next conference, when the team played its final conference in the league. He also coached the Barako Bull Energy (different franchise from his team he formerly coached) and led the team into a semi-finals finish in 2012 Commissioner's Cup, but he was fired after the season.

In 2013, Baculi was hired by GlobalPort Batang Pier, but replaced after two conferences by former PBA shooter Richie Ticzon.

== NU Athletic Director ==
He is also the former athletic director of National University of the Philippines until the UAAP Season 77 formally closed in March 2015. Baculi stepped down to return on his coaching duties.

During his successful term, the National University Bulldogs teams scored victories in the sports disciplines during Season 77 including Men's and Women's Basketball, Cheerdance, Men's Beach Volleyball, Men's Badminton, Men's and Women's Lawn Tennis.

== Coaching record ==
=== Collegiate ===
Season	Team	GP	W	L	PCT	Finish	PG	PW	PL	PCT	Results
2005	PCU	14	10	4	.714	2nd	4	2	2	.500	Finals
Totals		14	10	4	.714	Playoff Totals	4	2	2	.500	0 championships

=== Professional ===
Season	Team	Conference	Elims./Clas. round					Playoffs				
Season	Team	Conference	GP	W	L	PCT	Finish	PG	W	L	PCT	Results
2009–10	Barako Bull	Fiesta	18	3	15	.167	10th	—	—	—	—	Eliminated
2010–11	Barako Bull	Philippine Cup	14	3	11	.214	10th	—	—	—	—	Eliminated
2011–12	Barako Bull	Philippine Cup	14	6	8	.429	7th	1	0	1	.000	Quarterfinals
2011–12	Barako Bull	Commissioner's Cup	9	4	5	.444	5th	8	4	4	.500	Semifinals
2011–12	Barako Bull	Governors' Cup	9	4	5	.444	T-6th	1	0	1	.000	Eliminated
2012–13	GlobalPort	Commissioner's Cup	14	2	12	.143	9th	—	—	—	—	Eliminated
2012–13	GlobalPort	Governors' Cup	9	4	5	.444	5th	1	0	1	.000	Quarterfinals
Career Total			87	26	61	.299	Playoff Total	11	4	7	.364	0 PBA championships

Preceded by Leo Isaac	Barako Bull Energy Boosters head coach 2010-2011	Succeeded by Final
Preceded by Yeng Guiao	Barako Bull Energy head coach 2011–2012	Succeeded by Bong Ramos
Preceded by Glenn Capacio	GlobalPort Batang Pier head coach 2013	Succeeded by Richie Ticzon
