= 2011–12 Rain or Shine Elasto Painters season =

Philippine Basketball Association

- Head coach: Yeng Guiao
- General Manager: Andy Jao
- Owner(s): Asian Coatings Philippines, Inc.

Philippine Cup results
- Record: 9–5 (64.3%)
- Place: 5th
- Playoff finish: Semifinalist (eliminated by Powerade, 4-3)

Commissioner's Cup results
- Record: 3–6 (33.3%)
- Place: 8th
- Playoff finish: Did not qualify

Governors Cup results
- Record: 10–4 (71.4%)
- Place: 1st
- Playoff finish: Champions (def. B-Meg, 4-3)

Rain or Shine Elasto Painters seasons

The 2011–12 Rain or Shine Elasto Painters season was the 6th season of the franchise in the Philippine Basketball Association (PBA).

== Key dates ==
- August 28: The 2011 PBA Draft took place in Robinson's Place Ermita, Manila.

== Draft picks ==
Round	Pick	Player	Position	Nationality	College
1	2	Paul Lee	SG/SF	Philippines	University of the East

== Roster ==
2011–12 Rain or Shine Elasto Painters roster
Players
Coaches

Pos.	#	POB	Name	Height	Weight	DOB (YYYY–MM–DD)	From
G	1	(Philippines)	Jonathan Uyloan	6 ft 0 in (1.83 m)	185 lb (84 kg)		Golden West
G	3	(Philippines)	Paul Lee (R)	6 ft 0 in (1.83 m)	200 lb (91 kg)		UE
PF	5	(Philippines)	Larry Rodriguez	6 ft 4 in (1.93 m)	200 lb (91 kg)		PMI
SF	6	(Philippines)	Jireh Ibañes	6 ft 1 in (1.85 m)	182 lb (83 kg)		UP Diliman
G/F	10	(United States)	Gabe Norwood	6 ft 5 in (1.96 m)	210 lb (95 kg)		George Mason
PG	11	(Philippines)	Tyrone Tang	5 ft 7 in (1.70 m)	155 lb (70 kg)		De La Salle
G/F	16	(Philippines)	Jeffrei Chan	6 ft 3 in (1.91 m)	170 lb (77 kg)		Far Eastern
SG	18	(Philippines)	Ryan Araña	6 ft 2 in (1.88 m)	180 lb (82 kg)		De La Salle
F/C	20	(Philippines)	Jervy Cruz	6 ft 5 in (1.96 m)	220 lb (100 kg)		UST
G/F	21	(Philippines)	Chito Jaime	6 ft 4 in (1.93 m)	200 lb (91 kg)		AMA
G	23	(Philippines)	Ronjay Buenafe	6 ft 2 in (1.88 m)	200 lb (91 kg)		Emilio Aguinaldo
C	30	(Philippines)	Beau Belga	6 ft 6 in (1.98 m)	285 lb (129 kg)		Philippine Christian
SF	33	(Philippines)	Ronnie Matias	6 ft 4 in (1.93 m)	184 lb (83 kg)		Manila
F/C	48	(Philippines)	J.R. Quiñahan	6 ft 6 in (1.98 m)	275 lb (125 kg)		Visayas

Head coach

- (Philippines) Yeng Guiao (UP Diliman)

Assistant coach(es)

- (Philippines) Caloy Garcia (St. Benilde)
- (Philippines) Rhoel Nadurata
- (Philippines) Mike Buendia
- (Philippines) Jay Legacion
- (Philippines) Matthew Makalintal

Legend

- (C) Team captain
- (CI) Commissioner's Cup Import
- (GI) Governors' Cup Import
- (EI) EASL Import
- (DP) Unsigned draft pick
- (FA) Free agent
- (IN) Inactive
- (S) Suspended
- (R) Rookie
- Injured

== Philippine Cup ==
=== Eliminations ===
==== Standings ====
Pos	Team	W	L	PCT	GB	Qualification
1	B-Meg Llamados	10	4	.714 (Note: Head-to-head record: B-Meg 1–1 Talk 'N Text (B-Meg +8))	—	Twice-to-beat in the quarterfinals
2	Talk 'N Text Tropang Texters	10	4	.714	—	Twice-to-beat in the quarterfinals
3	Petron Blaze Boosters	9	5	.643 (Note: Head-to-head differential: Petron +8, Barangay Ginebra +1, Rain or Shine −9)	1	Best-of-three quarterfinals
4	Barangay Ginebra San Miguel	9	5	.643	1	Best-of-three quarterfinals
5	Rain or Shine Elasto Painters	9	5	.643	1	Best-of-three quarterfinals
6	Meralco Bolts	8	6	.571	2	Best-of-three quarterfinals
7	Barako Bull Energy Cola	6	8	.429 (Note: Head-to-head record: Barako Bull 1–1 Powerade (Barako Bull +35))	4	Twice-to-win in the quarterfinals
8	Powerade Tigers	6	8	.429	4	Twice-to-win in the quarterfinals
9	Alaska Aces	3	11	.214	7	
10	Shopinas.com Clickers	0	14	.000	10	

Source: PBA.ph

=== Bracket ===
Quarterfinals
(#1 twice-to-beat)
1	B-Meg	88	123
8	Powerade	97	131*
(Best-of-3)
4	Barangay Ginebra	0
5	Rain or Shine	2
(#2 twice-to-beat)
2	Talk 'N Text	81
7	Barako Bull	79
(Best-of-3)
3	Petron Blaze	2
6	Meralco	0

Semifinals (Best-of-7)
8	Powerade	4
5	Rain or Shine	3
2	Talk 'N Text	4
3	Petron Blaze	3

Finals (Best-of-7)
8	Powerade	1
2	Talk 'N Text	4

*Game went into overtime

=== Quarterfinals ===
==== Barangay Ginebra-Rain or Shine series ====
December 16

Barangay Ginebra Kings 105, Rain or Shine Elasto Painters 112 (OT)

Smart Araneta Coliseum, Quezon City

December 21

Barangay Ginebra Kings 91, Rain or Shine Elasto Painters 106
Rain or Shine wins series 2–0

Ynares Center, Antipolo

=== Semifinals ===
==== Powerade-Rain or Shine series ====
January 4

Rain or Shine Elasto Painters 114, Powerade Tigers 97

Cuneta Astrodome, Pasay

January 6

Rain or Shine Elasto Painters 113, Powerade Tigers 121

Smart Araneta Coliseum, Quezon City

January 8

Rain or Shine Elasto Painters 99, Powerade Tigers 104 (OT)

Smart Araneta Coliseum, Quezon City

January 10

Rain or Shine Elasto Painters 110, Powerade Tigers 95

Smart Araneta Coliseum, Quezon City

January 13

Rain or Shine Elasto Painters 108, Powerade Tigers 110

Smart Araneta Coliseum, Quezon City

January 15

Rain or Shine Elasto Painters 112, Powerade Tigers 98

Smart Araneta Coliseum, Quezon City

January 18

Rain or Shine Elasto Painters 98, Powerade Tigers 107
Powerade wins series 4–3

Cuneta Astrodome, Pasay

== Commissioner's Cup ==
=== Eliminations ===
==== Standings ====
Pos	Team	W	L	PCT	GB	Qualification
1	Talk 'N Text Tropang Texters	7	2	.778	—	Advance to semifinals
2	Barangay Ginebra Kings	6	3	.667 (Note: Second seed playoff: Barangay Ginebra 93–84 B-Meg)	1	Advance to semifinals
3	B-Meg Llamados	6	3	.667	1	Advance to quarterfinals
4	Alaska Aces	5	4	.556	2	Advance to quarterfinals
5	Barako Bull Energy Cola	4	5	.444 (Note: Head-to-head quotient: Barako Bull 1.04, Meralco 1.01, Powerade 0.95; sixth seed playoff: Meralco 102–98 Powerade)	3	Advance to quarterfinals
6	Meralco Bolts	4	5	.444	3	Advance to quarterfinals
7	Powerade Tigers	4	5	.444	3	
8	Rain or Shine Elasto Painters	3	6	.333 (Note: Head-to-head quotient: Rain or Shine 1.12, Petron 1.11, Air21 0.80)	4	
9	Petron Blaze Boosters	3	6	.333	4	
10	Air21 Express	3	6	.333	4	

Source: PBA.ph

== Governors Cup ==
=== Eliminations ===
==== Standings ====
Pos	Team	W	L	PCT	GB	Qualification
1	Rain or Shine Elasto Painters	8	1	.889	—	Semifinal round
2	B-Meg Llamados	6	3	.667	2	Semifinal round
3	Talk 'N Text Tropang Texters	5	4	.556 (Note: Head-to-head differential: Talk 'N Text +18, Barangay Ginebra 0, Petron −18)	3	Semifinal round
4	Barangay Ginebra Kings	5	4	.556	3	Semifinal round
5	Petron Blaze Boosters	5	4	.556	3	Semifinal round
6	Meralco Bolts	4	5	.444 (Note: Head-to-head differential: Meralco +11, Barako Bull +8, Powerade −18; sixth seed playoffs: Powerade 99–95 Barako Bull, Meralco 94–86 Powerade)	4	Semifinal round
7	Powerade Tigers	4	5	.444	4	
8	Barako Bull Energy Cola	4	5	.444	4	
9	Alaska Aces	2	7	.222 (Note: Head-to-head record: Alaska 1–0 Air21)	6	
10	Air21 Express	2	7	.222	6	

Source: PBA.ph

=== Semifinals ===
==== Standings ====
Overall standings
Pos	Team	W	L	PCT	GB	Qualification
1	Rain or Shine Elasto Painters	10	4	.714	—	Advance to finals (Note: If a team outside the top two teams wins four semifinal round games, then it and the second-placed team will playoff for the last finals berth; otherwise, the top 2 teams qualify outright.)
2	B-Meg Llamados	9	5	.643 (Note: Head-to-head record: B-Meg 2–0 Barangay Ginebra)	1	Guaranteed finals berth playoff
3	Barangay Ginebra Kings	9	5	.643	1	Qualify to finals berth playoff
4	Talk 'N Text Tropang Texters	8	6	.571	2	
5	Petron Blaze Boosters	6	8	.429 (Note: Head-to-head record: Meralco 1–1, Petron; Petron +12, Meralco −12)	4	
6	Meralco Bolts	6	8	.429	4	

Source: PBA.ph
Notes:

Semifinal round standings
Pos	Team	W	L	Qualification
1	Barangay Ginebra Kings	4	1	Qualify to finals berth playoff (Note: Finals berth playoff: B-Meg 74–72 Barangay Ginebra)
2	B-Meg Llamados	3	2	
3	Talk 'N Text Tropang Texters	3	2	
4	Rain or Shine Elasto Painters	2	3	
5	Meralco Bolts	2	3	
6	Petron Blaze Boosters	1	4	

Source: PBA.ph

=== Finals ===
July 22

Rain or Shine Elasto Painters 91, B-Meg Llamados 80

Smart Araneta Coliseum, Quezon City

July 25

Rain or Shine Elasto Painters 80, B-Meg Llamados 85

Smart Araneta Coliseum, Quezon City

July 27

Rain or Shine Elasto Painters 93, B-Meg Llamados 84

Smart Araneta Coliseum, Quezon City

July 29

Rain or Shine Elasto Painters 94, B-Meg Llamados 89

Smart Araneta Coliseum, Quezon City

August 1

Rain or Shine Elasto Painters 81, B-Meg Llamados 91

Smart Araneta Coliseum, Quezon City

August 3

Rain or Shine Elasto Painters 81, B-Meg Llamados 97

Smart Araneta Coliseum, Quezon City

August 5

Rain or Shine Elasto Painters 83, B-Meg Llamados 76
Rain or Shine wins series, 4-3

Smart Araneta Coliseum, Quezon City

== Transactions ==
=== Pre-season ===
==== Trades ====
August 26, 2011	To Rain or Shine JR Quiñahan; Norman Gonzales; 2013 and 2014 second round picks	To Powerade Doug Kramer; Josh Vanlandingham

=== Recruited imports ===
Tournament	Name	Debuted	Last game	Record
Commissioner's Cup	Duke Crews	February 12 (vs. Alaska)	March 24 (vs. Talk 'N Text)	3–6
Governors Cup	Jamelle Cornley	May 20 (vs. Alaska)	August 5 (vs. B-Meg)	14-7
