= 2011–12 Alaska Aces season =

- Head coach: Joel Banal (October 2011 – May 2012); Luigi Trillo (May 2012 – present)
- General manager: Joaqui Trillo
- Owner: Alaska Milk Corporation

Philippine Cup results
- Record: 3–11 (21.4%)
- Place: 9th
- Playoff finish: Did not qualify

Commissioner's Cup results
- Record: 5–4 (55.6%)
- Place: 4th
- Playoff finish: Quarterfinalist (eliminated by Barako Bull, 1–2)

Governors Cup results
- Record: 2–7 (22.2%)
- Place: 9th
- Playoff finish: Did not qualify

Alaska Aces seasons

The 2011–12 Alaska Aces season was the 26th season of the franchise in the Philippine Basketball Association (PBA).

== Key dates ==
- August 28: The 2011 PBA Draft took place in Robinson's Place Ermita, Manila.

== Draft picks ==
Round	Pick	Player	Position	Nationality	College
1	6	Mac Baracael	SF/PF	Philippines	Far Eastern University
2	13	Eric Salamat	G	Philippines	Ateneo
2	14	Julius Pasculado	G	Philippines	Wilbur Wright
2	15	Ariel Mepaña	F	Philippines	UV

== Roster ==
2011–12 Alaska Aces roster
Players
Coaches

Pos.	#	POB	Name	Height	Weight	DOB (YYYY–MM–DD)	From
C	1	(Philippines)	Samigue Eman	6 ft 9 in (2.06 m)	239 lb (108 kg)		Mindanao
G/F	3	(Philippines)	Cyrus Baguio	6 ft 2 in (1.88 m)	180 lb (82 kg)		UST
PG	5	(Philippines)	LA Tenorio (C)	5 ft 9 in (1.75 m)	155 lb (70 kg)		Ateneo
F/C	7	(Papua New Guinea)	Sonny Thoss	6 ft 7 in (2.01 m)	215 lb (98 kg)		James Cook
G	8	(Philippines)	Julius Pasculado (R)	5 ft 11 in (1.80 m)	178 lb (81 kg)		Wilbur Wright
G/F	9	(Philippines)	Niño Gelig	6 ft 3 in (1.91 m)	200 lb (91 kg)		UST
SF	10	(Philippines)	Mac Baracael (R)	6 ft 4 in (1.93 m)	205 lb (93 kg)		Far Eastern
F/C	11	(Philippines)	Hans Thiele	6 ft 6 in (1.98 m)	200 lb (91 kg)		UE
G	12	(Philippines)	RJ Jazul	5 ft 11 in (1.80 m)	170 lb (77 kg)		Letran
G	13	(Philippines)	Bonbon Custodio	6 ft 1 in (1.85 m)	165 lb (75 kg)		UE
F/C	21	(Philippines)	Paolo Bugia	6 ft 5 in (1.96 m)	215 lb (98 kg)		Ateneo
SG	24	(Philippines)	Brandon Cablay (injured)	6 ft 0 in (1.83 m)	180 lb (82 kg)		Vanguard
F	27	(Philippines)	Gabby Espinas	6 ft 4 in (1.93 m)	194 lb (88 kg)		Philippine Christian
F/C	30	(Philippines)	Ervin Sotto	6 ft 7 in (2.01 m)	210 lb (95 kg)		Saint Francis of Assisi
G/F	34	(Philippines)	Wesley Gonzales	6 ft 4 in (1.93 m)	180 lb (82 kg)		Ateneo
F	35	(United States)	Tony dela Cruz (C)	6 ft 5 in (1.96 m)	178 lb (81 kg)		UC Irvine

Head coach

- (Philippines) Luigi Trillo (De La Salle)

Assistant coach(es)

- (Philippines) Jojo Lastimosa (Ateneo)
- (Philippines) Dickie Bachmann (De La Salle)
- (Philippines) Topex Robinson (San Sebastian)

Legend

- (C) Team captain
- (CI) Commissioner's Cup Import
- (GI) Governors' Cup Import
- (EI) EASL Import
- (DP) Unsigned draft pick
- (FA) Free agent
- (IN) Inactive
- (S) Suspended
- (R) Rookie
- Injured

Note: Flags indicate national team eligibility at FIBA-sanctioned events. Players may hold other non-FIBA nationalities not displayed.

== Philippine Cup ==
=== Eliminations ===
==== Standings ====
Pos	Team	W	L	PCT	GB	Qualification
1	B-Meg Llamados	10	4	.714 (Note: Head-to-head record: B-Meg 1–1 Talk 'N Text (B-Meg +8))	—	Twice-to-beat in the quarterfinals
2	Talk 'N Text Tropang Texters	10	4	.714	—	Twice-to-beat in the quarterfinals
3	Petron Blaze Boosters	9	5	.643 (Note: Head-to-head differential: Petron +8, Barangay Ginebra +1, Rain or Shine −9)	1	Best-of-three quarterfinals
4	Barangay Ginebra San Miguel	9	5	.643	1	Best-of-three quarterfinals
5	Rain or Shine Elasto Painters	9	5	.643	1	Best-of-three quarterfinals
6	Meralco Bolts	8	6	.571	2	Best-of-three quarterfinals
7	Barako Bull Energy Cola	6	8	.429 (Note: Head-to-head record: Barako Bull 1–1 Powerade (Barako Bull +35))	4	Twice-to-win in the quarterfinals
8	Powerade Tigers	6	8	.429	4	Twice-to-win in the quarterfinals
9	Alaska Aces	3	11	.214	7	
10	Shopinas.com Clickers	0	14	.000	10	

Source: PBA.ph

== Commissioner's Cup ==
=== Eliminations ===
==== Standings ====
Pos	Team	W	L	PCT	GB	Qualification
1	Talk 'N Text Tropang Texters	7	2	.778	—	Advance to semifinals
2	Barangay Ginebra Kings	6	3	.667 (Note: Second seed playoff: Barangay Ginebra 93–84 B-Meg)	1	Advance to semifinals
3	B-Meg Llamados	6	3	.667	1	Advance to quarterfinals
4	Alaska Aces	5	4	.556	2	Advance to quarterfinals
5	Barako Bull Energy Cola	4	5	.444 (Note: Head-to-head quotient: Barako Bull 1.04, Meralco 1.01, Powerade 0.95; sixth seed playoff: Meralco 102–98 Powerade)	3	Advance to quarterfinals
6	Meralco Bolts	4	5	.444	3	Advance to quarterfinals
7	Powerade Tigers	4	5	.444	3	
8	Rain or Shine Elasto Painters	3	6	.333 (Note: Head-to-head quotient: Rain or Shine 1.12, Petron 1.11, Air21 0.80)	4	
9	Petron Blaze Boosters	3	6	.333	4	
10	Air21 Express	3	6	.333	4	

Source: PBA.ph

=== Bracket ===
Quarterfinals (Best-of-3)
4	Alaska	1
5	Barako Bull	2
3	B-Meg	2
6	Meralco	1

Semifinals (Best-of-5)
1	Talk 'N Text	3
5	Barako Bull	2
2	Barangay Ginebra	1
3	B-Meg	3

Finals (Best-of-7)
1	Talk 'N Text	3
3	B-Meg	4

=== Quarterfinals ===
==== Alaska–Barako Bull series ====
April 1

Alaska Aces 90, Barako Bull Energy 103

Smart Araneta Coliseum, Quezon City

April 4

Alaska Aces 99, Barako Bull Energy 92

Smart Araneta Coliseum, Quezon City

April 8

Alaska Aces 85, Barako Bull Energy 106
Barako Bull wins series, 2–1

Smart Araneta Coliseum, Quezon City

== Governors Cup ==
=== Eliminations ===
==== Standings ====
Pos	Team	W	L	PCT	GB	Qualification
1	Rain or Shine Elasto Painters	8	1	.889	—	Semifinal round
2	B-Meg Llamados	6	3	.667	2	Semifinal round
3	Talk 'N Text Tropang Texters	5	4	.556 (Note: Head-to-head differential: Talk 'N Text +18, Barangay Ginebra 0, Petron −18)	3	Semifinal round
4	Barangay Ginebra Kings	5	4	.556	3	Semifinal round
5	Petron Blaze Boosters	5	4	.556	3	Semifinal round
6	Meralco Bolts	4	5	.444 (Note: Head-to-head differential: Meralco +11, Barako Bull +8, Powerade −18; sixth seed playoffs: Powerade 99–95 Barako Bull, Meralco 94–86 Powerade)	4	Semifinal round
7	Powerade Tigers	4	5	.444	4	
8	Barako Bull Energy Cola	4	5	.444	4	
9	Alaska Aces	2	7	.222 (Note: Head-to-head record: Alaska 1–0 Air21)	6	
10	Air21 Express	2	7	.222	6	

Source: PBA.ph

== Transactions ==
=== Trades ===
==== Pre-season ====
August 28, 2011	To Alaska 2014 2nd round pick	To Meralco 2011 2nd round pick (Gilbert Bulawan)

==== Governors Cup ====
May 11, 2012	To Alaska Gabby Espinas	To Meralco Jay-R Reyes

May 29, 2012	To Air21 Eric Salamat future second round pick	To Alaska RJ Jazul

=== Additions ===
Player	Signed	Former team
Gabby Espinas	May 11, 2012(via trade)	Meralco Bolts
RJ Jazul	May 29, 2012(via trade)	Air21 Express

=== Subtractions ===
Player	Signed	New team
Jay-R Reyes	May 11, 2012(via trade)	Meralco Bolts
Eric Salamat	May 29, 2012(via trade)	Air21 Express
Julius Pasculado	May 29, 2012	Waived

=== Recruited imports ===
Tournament	Name	Debuted	Last game	Record
Commissioner's Cup	Adam Parada	February 10 (vs. Barako Bull)	April 8 (vs. Barako Bull)	6–6
Governors Cup	Jason Forte	May 20 (vs. Rain or Shine)	June 27 (vs. Air21)	2–7
