= 2011–12 PBA season =

37th PBA season

- Duration: October 2, 2011 – August 5, 2012
- Teams: 10
- TV partner(s): Sports5 (AKTV on IBC); AksyonTV International (International)

2011 PBA Draft
- Top draft pick: JVee Casio
- Picked by: Powerade Tigers
- Season MVP: Mark Caguioa (Barangay Ginebra Kings)
- Top scorer: Gary David (Powerade Tigers)
- Philippine Cup champions: Talk 'N Text Tropang Texters
- Philippine Cup runners-up: Powerade Tigers
- Commissioner's Cup champions: B-Meg Llamados
- Commissioner's Cup runners-up: Talk 'N Text Tropang Texters
- Governors' Cup champions: Rain or Shine Elasto Painters
- Governors' Cup runners-up: B-Meg Llamados

Seasons
- ← 2010–11 2012–13 →

The 2011–12 PBA season was the 37th season of the Philippine Basketball Association. The season was formally opened on October 2, 2011 at the Smart Araneta Coliseum, and finished on August 5, 2012. The season used three-conference format, starting with the Philippine Cup, or the traditional All-Filipino Conference. The mid season Commissioner's Cup featured unlimited height limit for imports. The Governors' Cup became the third and final conference for this season.

The first activity of the season was the 2011 PBA Draft held on August 28, 2011, at the Robinsons Place Manila in Ermita, Manila.

== Board of governors ==
=== Executive committee ===
- Chito Salud (Commissioner)
- Mamerto Mondragon (Chairman, representing Rain or Shine Elasto Painters)
- Jose Bayani Baylon (Vice-Chairman, representing Powerade Tigers)
- Robert Non (Treasurer, representing Barangay Ginebra Kings)

=== Teams ===
Team	Company	Governor	Alternate Governor
Air21 Express	Airfrieght 2100, Inc.	Lucia Jane Lina	Alfredo Pilladolid
Alaska Aces	Alaska Milk Corporation	Joaquin Trillo	
B-Meg Llamados	San Miguel Pure Foods Company, Inc.	Rene Pardo	
Barako Bull Energy	Energy Food and Drinks Inc.	Manuel Alvarez	
Barangay Ginebra Kings	Ginebra San Miguel, Inc.	Bernie Marquez	Robert Non
Meralco Bolts	Manila Electric Company	Ramon Segismundo	Betty Siy-Yap
Petron Blaze Boosters	Petron Corporation	Roberto Huang	Eliezer Capacio
Powerade Tigers	Coca-Cola Bottlers Philippines, Inc.	Jose Bayani Baylon	Kenneth Duremdes
Rain or Shine Elasto Painters	Asian Coatings Philippines, Inc.	Mamerto Mondragon	Andrew Jao
Talk 'N Text Tropang Texters	Smart Communications	Manuel V. Pangilinan	Patrick Gregorio / Victorino Vargas

== Pre-season events ==
=== Player movement ===
Key transactions:
Trades:

- Rain or Shine traded Doug Kramer and Josh Vanlandingham to Powerade for JR Quiñahan, Norman Gonzales and Powerade's 2013 and 2014 second round picks.
- Barako Bull Energy, B-Meg Llamados, and Shopinas.com Clickers involved a three-way deal. Shopinas.com acquired Elmer Espiritu from Barako Bull and Brian Ilad from B-Meg, B-Meg received 5th pick overall Mark Barroca from Shopinas.com, and Barako Bull acquired Don Allado and future second round picks from B-Meg.

=== Notable occurrences ===
- The PBA board approved the sale of the Barako Bull Energy Boosters team franchise from Photokina Marketing to the Linaheim Corporate Services, owners of the Air21 Express. The team will now be known as the Shopinas.com Clickers.
- The Air21 Express will be renamed as Barako Bull Energy starting this season. The name change occurred after the Lina Group bought 49 percent stake of Energy Food and Drinks Inc., a subsidiary of Photokina Marketing and the exclusive distributor of Red Bull Energy Drink products in the Philippines. The "Energy Boosters" moniker will be dropped and instead the team will be known as "Energy", since there will be a conflict in using the "Boosters" moniker with the Petron Blaze Boosters.
- The PBA board approved the 20% salary cap increase and the standardization of game bonuses on September 8. The player salary cap was increased from P350,000 to P420,000. The proposals were approved at the heels of an outburst by Alaska Aces owner Fred Uytengsu during the press conference announcing Tim Cone's resignation as head coach of Alaska. Uytengsu commented that the league is not a level playing field, with some teams paying their players more than the monthly amount set by the PBA.

=== Coaching changes ===
- Barako Bull Energy (formerly Air21 Express) hired Junel Baculi as head coach, who also was the head coach of the Barako Bull franchise that disbanded in 2010. Baculi will be replacing Bong Ramos, who will slide down as assistant coach.
- On August 26, the Barangay Ginebra Kings appointed assistant coach Siot Tanquincen as co-head coach of the team, together with Jong Uichico.
- On September 1, Alaska Aces coach Tim Cone requested to be released from his contract, which is set to expire in 2013. Assistant Joel Banal will take over as head coach.
- Two weeks after resigning as head coach of the Alaska Aces, Tim Cone was appointed as the new head coach of the B-Meg Llamados. Richard del Rosario, who was appointed as acting head coach in August was demoted to assistant coach along with former B-meg head coach Jorge Gallent. Gallent later was reassigned as assistant coach of Petron Blaze.

== Opening ceremonies ==
The season began on October 2 with the Rain or Shine Elasto Painters defeating the Barangay Ginebra Kings, 94–93.

The muses for the participating teams are as follows:

Team	Muse
Alaska Aces	Bubbles Paraiso
B-Meg Llamados	Rhian Ramos
Barako Bull Energy	Helga Krapf
Barangay Ginebra Kings	Solenn Heussaff
Meralco Bolts	Diane Necio and Isabella Manjon
Petron Blaze Boosters	Helen Nicolette Henson, Martha Chloe McCully and Samantha Neville
Powerade Tigers	Maricar Reyes
Rain or Shine Elasto Painters	Michelle Gavagan
Shopinas.com Clickers	Iya Villania
Talk 'N Text Tropang Texters	Venus Raj and Nora Aunor

== 2011–12 Philippine Cup ==
=== Elimination round ===
Pos	Team	W	L	PCT	GB	Qualification
1	B-Meg Llamados	10	4	.714 (Note: Head-to-head record: B-Meg 1–1 Talk 'N Text (B-Meg +8))	—	Twice-to-beat in the quarterfinals
2	Talk 'N Text Tropang Texters	10	4	.714	—	Twice-to-beat in the quarterfinals
3	Petron Blaze Boosters	9	5	.643 (Note: Head-to-head differential: Petron +8, Barangay Ginebra +1, Rain or Shine −9)	1	Best-of-three quarterfinals
4	Barangay Ginebra San Miguel	9	5	.643	1	Best-of-three quarterfinals
5	Rain or Shine Elasto Painters	9	5	.643	1	Best-of-three quarterfinals
6	Meralco Bolts	8	6	.571	2	Best-of-three quarterfinals
7	Barako Bull Energy Cola	6	8	.429 (Note: Head-to-head record: Barako Bull 1–1 Powerade (Barako Bull +35))	4	Twice-to-win in the quarterfinals
8	Powerade Tigers	6	8	.429	4	Twice-to-win in the quarterfinals
9	Alaska Aces	3	11	.214	7	
10	Shopinas.com Clickers	0	14	.000	10	

Source: PBA.ph

=== Playoffs ===
Quarterfinals
(#1 twice-to-beat)
1	B-Meg	88	123
8	Powerade	97	131*
(Best-of-3)
4	Barangay Ginebra	0
5	Rain or Shine	2
(#2 twice-to-beat)
2	Talk 'N Text	81
7	Barako Bull	79
(Best-of-3)
3	Petron Blaze	2
6	Meralco	0

Semifinals (Best-of-7)
8	Powerade	4
5	Rain or Shine	3
2	Talk 'N Text	4
3	Petron Blaze	3

Finals (Best-of-7)
8	Powerade	1
2	Talk 'N Text	4

*Game went into overtime

==== Quarterfinals ====
Team 1	Series	Team 2	Game 1	Game 2
(1) B-Meg Llamados*	0–2	(8) Powerade Tigers	88–97	123–131 (OT)
(2) Talk 'N Text Tropang Texters*	1–0	(7) Barako Bull Energy	81–79	—

Team 1	Series	Team 2	Game 1	Game 2	Game 3
(3) Petron Blaze Boosters	2–0	(6) Meralco Bolts	91–84	80–64	—
(4) Barangay Ginebra Kings	0–2	(5) Rain or Shine Elasto Painters	105–112 (OT)	91–106	—

*Team has twice-to-beat advantage. Team #1 only has to win once, while team #2 has to win twice.

==== Semifinals ====
Team 1	Series	Team 2	Game 1	Game 2	Game 3	Game 4	Game 5	Game 6	Game 7
(2) Talk 'N Text Tropang Texters	4–3	(3) Petron Blaze Boosters	87–83	89–91	93–95	82–85	93–91	111–108	92–91
(5) Rain or Shine Elasto Painters	3–4	(8) Powerade Tigers	114–97	113–121	99–104 (OT)	110–95	108–110	112–98	98–107

==== Finals ====
Team 1	Series	Team 2	Game 1	Game 2	Game 3	Game 4	Game 5	Game 6	Game 7
(2) Talk 'N Text Tropang Texters	4–1	(8) Powerade Tigers	116–100	102–96	133–126 (OT)	97–100	110–101	—	—

- Finals MVP: Larry Fonacier (Talk 'N Text)
- Best Player of the Conference: Gary David (Powerade)

== 2012 Blue vs. Green Dream Game ==
AKTV

February 5, 2012

Blue Eagles	104–117	Green Archers

Smart Araneta Coliseum, Quezon City

=== Rosters ===
==== Blue ====
- Rabeh Al-Hussaini
- Nonoy Baclao
- JC Intal
- Enrico Villanueva
- Doug Kramer
- LA Tenorio
- Eric Salamat
- Paolo Bugia
- Wesley Gonzales
- Larry Fonacier
- Rich Alvarez
- Magnum Membrere
- Japeth Aguilar

Coach: Norman Black

==== Green ====
- Mike Cortez
- Willy Wilson
- Ren-Ren Ritualo
- Joseph Yeo
- Tyrone Tang
- Jerwin Gaco
- Rico Maierhofer
- Carlo Sharma
- JVee Casio
- Ryan Araña
- Don Allado
- Mark Cardona
- Brian Ilad

Coach: Franz Pumaren

== 2012 Commissioner's Cup ==
After the PBA Philippine Cup finals, the PBA is slated to return in the PBA Commissioner's Cup. This conference features imports for each team, with an unlimited height ceiling.

=== Notable events ===
- After a dismal finish in the Philippine Cup, the Lina Group of Companies announced that the Shopinas.com Clickers will be renamed as the Air21 Express starting in the Commissioner's Cup.
- On February 2, Coca-Cola Bottlers Philippines was rumored to sell its PBA team, the Powerade Tigers, to San Miguel Corporation, therefore allowing SMC to own and unprecedented 4 teams in the league. The rumors arose when it was revealed that certain factions in the Coca-Cola management have decided to sell the team. The next day, however, the trade rumors were debunked by Powerade manager JB Baylon.
- Due to being the Philippine national basketball team's naturalized player, Marcus Douthit's rights to be signed as an import (despite having naturalized Filipino status) were bidded on by the different PBA teams. The Air21 Express won the rights to sign Douthit after all the other teams passed. Douthit then agreed to play for Air21, with the rule that if he leaves Air21, he cannot play for any other team.

=== Player movement ===
Key transactions:
Trades:

- On January 27, 2012, sister teams Barangay Ginebra Gin Kings, B-Meg Llamados and third team Barako Bull Energy completed a five – player blockbuster deal. In the deal, B-MEG received Gin Kings forward JC Intal and a 2012 2nd round pick from Barako Bull that originally belonged to Air 21, formerly Shopinas.com. Ginebra got Llamados forward Kerby Raymundo and Energy rookie Dylan Ababou. Barako Bull ended up with Gin Kings veteran swingman Ronald Tubid and rookie Reil Cervantes, as well as a second round draft pick in 2014 from Ginebra. This marks the second time that Barako Bull has traded its top draft picks.
- On the same day, Air21 completed a four-man trade with the Meralco Bolts. Air21 acquired Nelbert Omolon and Mark Isip from Meralco in exchange for Mark Canlas, Dennis Daa, and a 2012 first-round draft pick that belonged to Meralco originally.

=== Coaching changes ===
- On January 11, after the Barangay Ginebra Kings lost their quarterfinal series against Rain or Shine Elasto Painters, coach Jong Uichico was revealed to have left Ginebra to join the Smart Gilas national basketball team coaches pool. Co-head coach Siot Tanquincen has become the sole head coach. On January 17, Uichico joined the Meralco Bolts as a team consultant.

=== Elimination round ===
Pos	Team	W	L	PCT	GB	Qualification
1	Talk 'N Text Tropang Texters	7	2	.778	—	Advance to semifinals
2	Barangay Ginebra Kings	6	3	.667 (Note: Second seed playoff: Barangay Ginebra 93–84 B-Meg)	1	Advance to semifinals
3	B-Meg Llamados	6	3	.667	1	Advance to quarterfinals
4	Alaska Aces	5	4	.556	2	Advance to quarterfinals
5	Barako Bull Energy Cola	4	5	.444 (Note: Head-to-head quotient: Barako Bull 1.04, Meralco 1.01, Powerade 0.95; sixth seed playoff: Meralco 102–98 Powerade)	3	Advance to quarterfinals
6	Meralco Bolts	4	5	.444	3	Advance to quarterfinals
7	Powerade Tigers	4	5	.444	3	
8	Rain or Shine Elasto Painters	3	6	.333 (Note: Head-to-head quotient: Rain or Shine 1.12, Petron 1.11, Air21 0.80)	4	
9	Petron Blaze Boosters	3	6	.333	4	
10	Air21 Express	3	6	.333	4	

Source: PBA.ph

=== Playoffs ===
Quarterfinals (Best-of-3)
4	Alaska	1
5	Barako Bull	2
3	B-Meg	2
6	Meralco	1

Semifinals (Best-of-5)
1	Talk 'N Text	3
5	Barako Bull	2
2	Barangay Ginebra	1
3	B-Meg	3

Finals (Best-of-7)
1	Talk 'N Text	3
3	B-Meg	4

==== Quarterfinals ====
Team 1	Series	Team 2	Game 1	Game 2	Game 3
(3) B-Meg Llamados	2–1	(6) Meralco Bolts	81–103	95–85	86–76
(4) Alaska Aces	1–2	(5) Barako Bull Energy	90–103	99–92	85–106

==== Semifinals ====
Team 1	Series	Team 2	Game 1	Game 2	Game 3	Game 4	Game 5
(1) Talk 'N Text Tropang Texters	3–2	(5) Barako Bull Energy	77–84	123–98	81–85	108–90	101–90
(2) Barangay Ginebra Kings	1–3	(3) B-Meg Llamados	67–82	77–83	88–79	84–108	—

==== Finals ====
Team 1	Series	Team 2	Game 1	Game 2	Game 3	Game 4	Game 5	Game 6	Game 7
(1) Talk 'N Text Tropang Texters	3–4	(3) B-Meg Llamados	82–88	104–102	87–91	100–85	66–82	92–82	84–90 (OT)

- Finals MVP: James Yap (B-Meg)
- Best Player of the Conference: Mark Caguioa (Barangay Ginebra)
- Best Import of the Conference: Denzel Bowles (B-Meg)

== 2012 Governors' Cup ==
=== Notable events ===
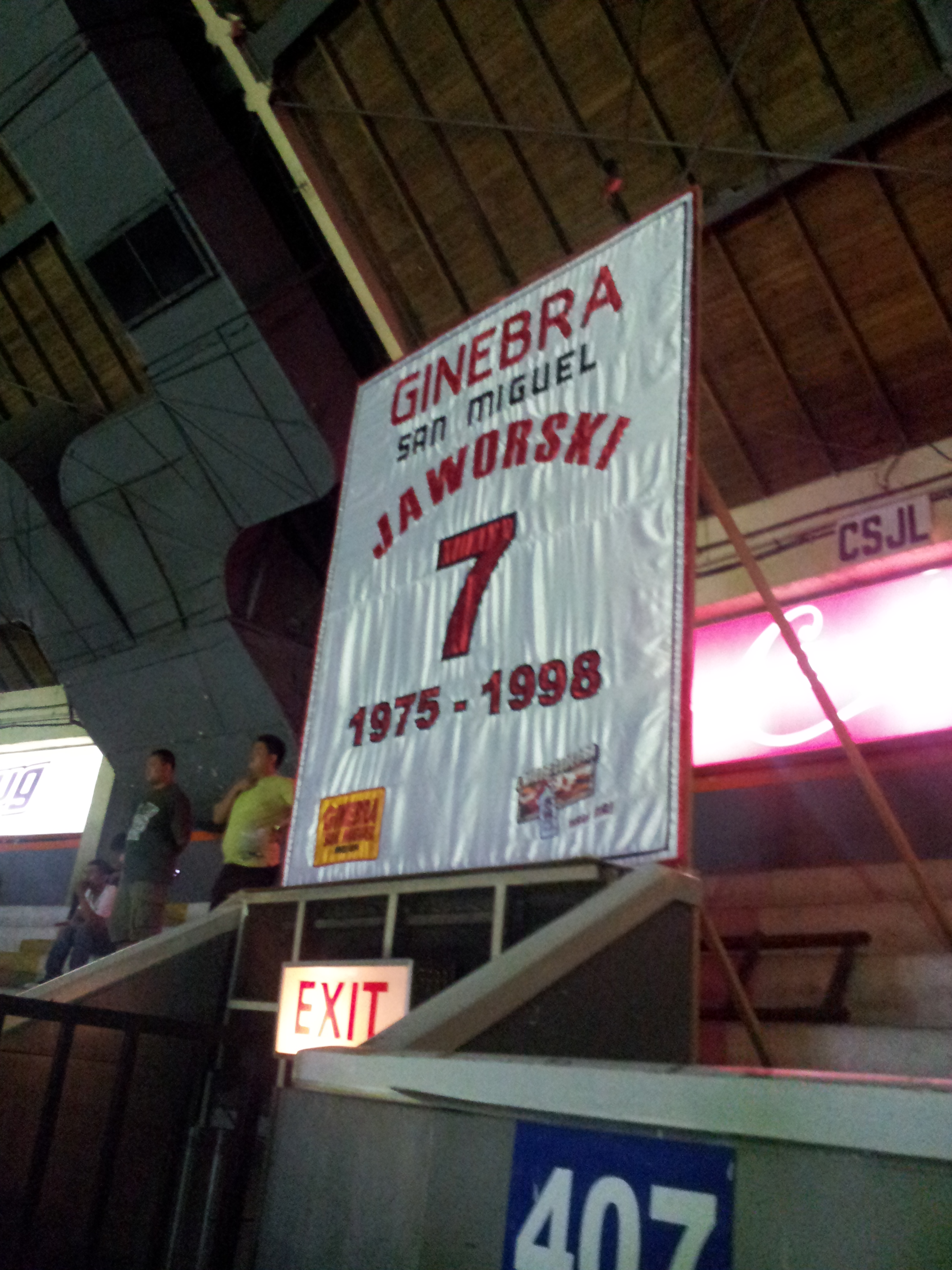
Robert Jaworski's retired jersey banner at the rafters of the Smart Araneta Coliseum during the retirement ceremonies.

- The Barangay Ginebra Kings announced the retirement of Robert Jaworski's #7 jersey. The ceremony was held on July 8 before the start of the semifinals game between Barangay Ginebra and Petron Blaze.
- In commemoration of the jersey retirement of Robert Jaworski, the Barangay Ginebra Kings wore their throwback 1985 Ginebra San Miguel white jerseys (with slight modifications, specifically the replacement of the La Tondeña "G" logo with the current GSM yellow logo), on their semifinal game against Petron Blaze.
- PBA referee Peter Balao was suspended until the end of the season after a miss call of a three-second violation during the knockout game between the Barako Bull Energy and the Powerade Tigers.
- Following the loss of Barako Bull Energy against the Powerade Tigers in their knockout game, Don Allado of Barako Bull posted on his Twitter account his frustrations and mentioned that the PBA games are fixed. The Twitter posts were later deleted by Allado within a day and issued an apology to the league and the PBA officials. PBA Commissioner Chito Salud called Allado to his office to explain his accusations. Allado was later fined Php 500,000; Php 300,000 will go the PBA players educational trust fund and Php 200,000 to a charitable institution of his choice. Allado is also banned for one conference from all PBA related activities. The fine became the largest penalty for a player since Wynne Arboleda's fine after a violent altercation with a fan during their game against Smart Gilas in 2009.

=== Player movement ===
Key transactions:
Trades:

- On April 20, 2012 Powerade Tigers and Petron Blaze Boosters completed a five – player deal that would send Celino Cruz and Marcio Lassiter to Petron while Powerade receiving reigning Rookie of the Year Rabeh Al-Hussaini, Rey Guevarra and Lordy Tugade.
- On May 1, 2012 Barako Bull Energy has agreed on a trade that would send veteran Dorian Pena to the Petron Blaze Boosters in exchange for Carlo Sharma and Celino Cruz.
- On May 5, 2012 Powerade Tigers traded Doug Kramer to the Barako Bull Energy for backup forward Jondan Salvador and a first round pick in the upcoming draft.
- On May 11, 2012 Alaska Aces has agreed to trade center Jay-R Reyes to the Meralco Bolts in exchange for power forward Gabby Espinas. The transaction also gave the Aces the right to switch draft picks with Bolts in the upcoming draft.
- On May 29, 2012, Air 21 Express traded starting point guard RJ Jazul to the Alaska Aces in exchange for backup guard Eric Salamat and a 2012 second – round pick.

=== Coaching changes ===
- On April 16, 2012, coach Joel Banal of the Alaska Aces who was signed to a three-year deal, resigned from the team after losing the quarterfinal series against the Barako Bull Energy. Luigi Trillo, the son of Alaska team manager Joaqui Trillo, assistant coach of Alaska and former head coach of the PBA D-League Cebuana Lhuillier Gems, was appointed to replace Banal. Trillo also stated that he will reinstate the triangle offense in Alaska.

=== Elimination round ===
Pos	Team	W	L	PCT	GB	Qualification
1	Rain or Shine Elasto Painters	8	1	.889	—	Semifinal round
2	B-Meg Llamados	6	3	.667	2	Semifinal round
3	Talk 'N Text Tropang Texters	5	4	.556 (Note: Head-to-head differential: Talk 'N Text +18, Barangay Ginebra 0, Petron −18)	3	Semifinal round
4	Barangay Ginebra Kings	5	4	.556	3	Semifinal round
5	Petron Blaze Boosters	5	4	.556	3	Semifinal round
6	Meralco Bolts	4	5	.444 (Note: Head-to-head differential: Meralco +11, Barako Bull +8, Powerade −18; sixth seed playoffs: Powerade 99–95 Barako Bull, Meralco 94–86 Powerade)	4	Semifinal round
7	Powerade Tigers	4	5	.444	4	
8	Barako Bull Energy Cola	4	5	.444	4	
9	Alaska Aces	2	7	.222 (Note: Head-to-head record: Alaska 1–0 Air21)	6	
10	Air21 Express	2	7	.222	6	

Source: PBA.ph

=== Semifinal round ===
Overall standings
Pos	Team	W	L	PCT	GB	Qualification
1	Rain or Shine Elasto Painters	10	4	.714	—	Advance to finals (Note: If a team outside the top two teams wins four semifinal round games, then it and the second-placed team will playoff for the last finals berth; otherwise, the top 2 teams qualify outright.)
2	B-Meg Llamados	9	5	.643 (Note: Head-to-head record: B-Meg 2–0 Barangay Ginebra)	1	Guaranteed finals berth playoff
3	Barangay Ginebra Kings	9	5	.643	1	Qualify to finals berth playoff
4	Talk 'N Text Tropang Texters	8	6	.571	2	
5	Petron Blaze Boosters	6	8	.429 (Note: Head-to-head record: Meralco 1–1, Petron; Petron +12, Meralco −12)	4	
6	Meralco Bolts	6	8	.429	4	

Source: PBA.ph
Notes:

Semifinal round standings
Pos	Team	W	L	Qualification
1	Barangay Ginebra Kings	4	1	Qualify to finals berth playoff (Note: Finals berth playoff: B-Meg 74–72 Barangay Ginebra)
2	B-Meg Llamados	3	2	
3	Talk 'N Text Tropang Texters	3	2	
4	Rain or Shine Elasto Painters	2	3	
5	Meralco Bolts	2	3	
6	Petron Blaze Boosters	1	4	

Source: PBA.ph

=== Finals ===
Team 1	Series	Team 2	Game 1	Game 2	Game 3	Game 4	Game 5	Game 6	Game 7
(1) Rain or Shine Elasto Painters	4–3	(2) B-Meg Llamados	91–80	80–85	93–84	94–89	81–91	81–97	83–76

- Finals MVP: Jeffrei Chan (Rain or Shine)
- Best Player of the Conference: Mark Caguioa (Barangay Ginebra)
- Best Import of the Conference: Jamelle Cornley (Rain or Shine)

== Individual awards ==
=== Leo Awards ===
- Most Valuable Player: Mark Caguioa (Barangay Ginebra)
- Rookie of the Year: Paul Lee (Rain or Shine)
- First Mythical Team:
  - Mark Caguioa (Barangay Ginebra)
  - Gary David (Powerade)
  - Ranidel de Ocampo (Talk 'N Text)
  - Arwind Santos (Petron Blaze)
  - James Yap (B-Meg)
- Second Mythical Team:
  - Jayson Castro (Talk 'N Text)
  - Paul Lee (Rain or Shine)
  - Sonny Thoss (Alaska)
  - Jeffrei Chan (Rain or Shine)
  - Kelly Williams (Talk 'N Text)
- All-Defensive Team:
  - Marc Pingris (B-Meg)
  - Doug Kramer (Barako Bull)
  - Arwind Santos (Petron Blaze)
  - Jireh Ibañes (Rain or Shine)
  - Ryan Reyes (Talk 'N Text)
- Most Improved Player: Jeffrei Chan (Rain or Shine)
- Sportsmanship Award: JVee Casio (Powerade)

=== Awards given by the PBA Press Corps ===
- Scoring Champion: Gary David (Powerade)
- Coach of the Year: Yeng Guiao (Rain or Shine)
- Mr. Quality Minutes: Larry Fonacier (Talk 'N Text)
- Comeback Player of the Year: Mark Caguioa (Barangay Ginebra)
- Executive of the Year: Raymund Yu and Terry Que (Rain or Shine)
- Defensive Player of the Year: Jireh Ibañes (Rain or Shine)
- All-Rookie Team
  - Paul Lee (Rain or Shine)
  - JVee Casio (Powerade)
  - Marcio Lassiter (Petron Blaze)
  - Dylan Ababou (Barangay Ginebra)
  - James Sena (Air21)

== Cumulative standings ==
Pos	Team	Pld	W	L	PCT	Best finish
1	Talk 'N Text Tropang Texters	62	40	22	.645	Champions
2	B-Meg Llamados	61	38	23	.623	Champions
3	Rain or Shine Elasto Painters	53	31	22	.585	Champions
4	Barangay Ginebra Kings	44	25	19	.568	Semifinalist
5	Petron Blaze Boosters	46	23	23	.500	Semifinalist
6	Meralco Bolts	44	21	23	.477	Semifinalist
7	Powerade Tigers	49	22	27	.449	Finalist
8	Barako Bull Energy	42	18	24	.429	Semifinalist
9	Alaska Aces	35	11	24	.314	Quarterfinalist
10	Shopinas.com Clickers/Air21 Express	32	5	27	.156	Elimination round

=== Elimination rounds ===
Pos	Team	Pld	W	L	PCT
1	B-Meg Llamados	32	22	10	.688 (Note: Elimination round head-to-head record: B-Meg 3–1 Talk 'N Text)
2	Talk 'N Text Tropang Texters	32	22	10	.688
3	Rain or Shine Elasto Painters	32	20	12	.625 (Note: Elimination round head-to-head record: Rain or Shine 2–1 Barangay Ginebra)
4	Barangay Ginebra Kings	32	20	12	.625
5	Petron Blaze Boosters	32	17	15	.531
6	Meralco Bolts	32	16	16	.500
7	Barako Bull Energy	32	14	18	.438 (Note: Elimination round head-to-head record: Barako Bull 2–1 Powerade)
8	Powerade Tigers	32	14	18	.438
9	Alaska Aces	32	10	22	.313
10	Shopinas.com Clickers/Air21 Express	32	5	27	.156

=== Playoffs ===
Pos	Team	Pld	W	L
1	Talk 'N Text Tropang Texters	30	18	12
2	B-Meg Llamados	29	16	13
3	Rain or Shine Elasto Painters	21	11	10
4	Powerade Tigers	17	8	9
5	Petron Blaze Boosters	14	6	8
6	Meralco Bolts	12	5	7
7	Barangay Ginebra Kings	12	5	7
8	Barako Bull Energy	10	4	6
9	Alaska Aces	3	1	2
10	Shopinas.com Clickers/Air21 Express	0	0	0
