= Dylan Ababou =

Filipino basketball player (born 1986)

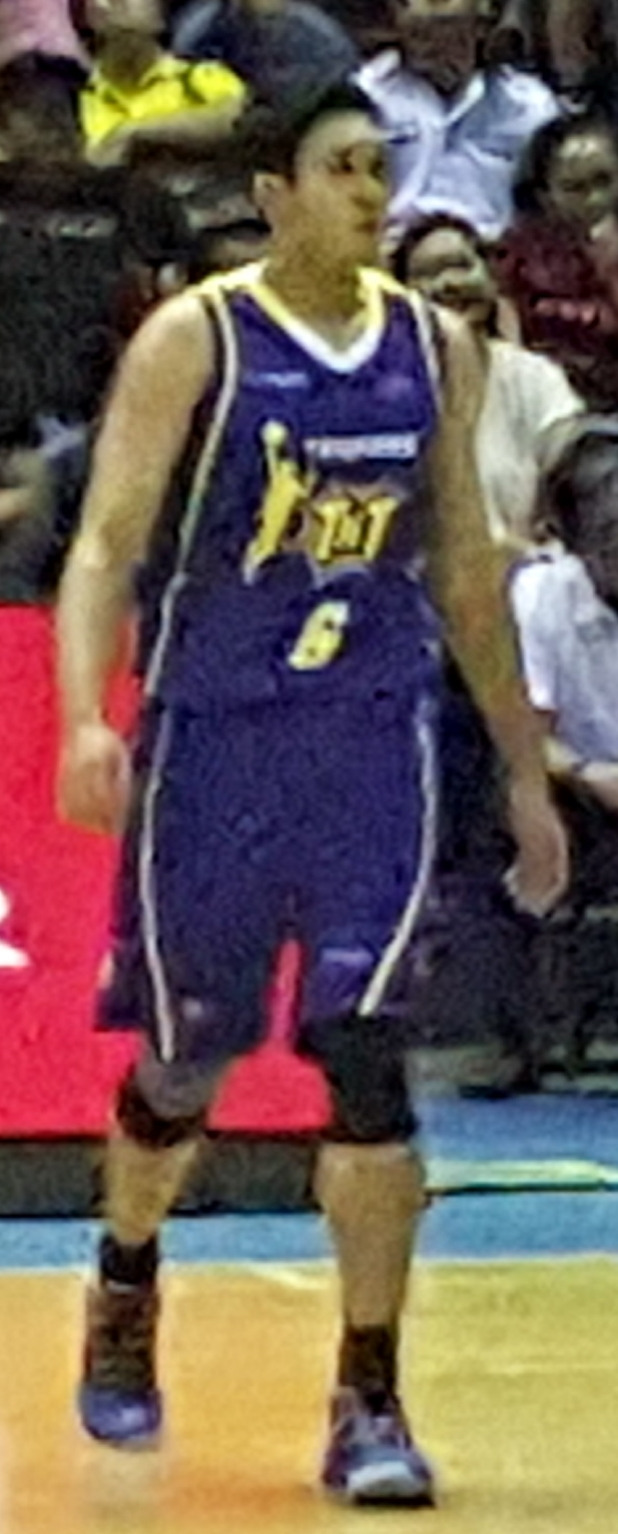
- Ababou with TNT in 2016

Personal information
- Born: December 7, 1986 (age 39) Leyte, Philippines
- Listed height: 6 ft 3 in (1.91 m)
- Listed weight: 185 lb (84 kg)

Career information
- High school: Siena (Quezon City)
- College: UST
- PBA draft: 2011: 1st round, 10th overall pick
- Drafted by: Barako Bull Energy
- Playing career: 2011–2018
- Position: Small forward / shooting guard

Career history
- 2011–2012: Barako Bull Energy
- 2012–2015: Barangay Ginebra San Miguel
- 2015: Barako Bull Energy
- 2015–2016: Talk 'N Text Tropang Texters / TNT Tropang Texters / Tropang TNT / TNT KaTropa
- 2016–2017: Blackwater Elite
- 2017: GlobalPort Batang Pier
- 2017: Phoenix Fuel Masters
- 2017–2018: Kia Picanto / Columbian Dyip

Career highlights
- PBA All-Star (2012); PBA All-Rookie Team (2012); UAAP champion (2006); UAAP Most Valuable Player (2009); UAAP Sixth Man of the Year (2006); UAAP scoring champion (2009)

Dylan Simon Rosales Ababou (born December 7, 1986) is a Filipino former professional basketball player. He played for seven teams during his career in the Philippine Basketball Association (PBA). He was drafted 10th overall in 2011 by the Barako Bull Energy.

Ababou was one of the key players of the UST Growling Tigers who won the UAAP title in 2006. He was also named the 2009 UAAP Season MVP. He also played for the Philippines men's national basketball team.

== Early life ==
Dylan Ababou was born in Leyte to parents Rachid Ababou and Rosemarie Rosales. He was raised by his grandmother and started playing basketball when he was 8 years old.

== College career ==
Ababou played for the UST Growling Tigers men's basketball team in the University Athletic Association of the Philippines from 2005 to 2009. He also had interest in playing for either San Beda or UP. In 2006, he was one of the members of the 2006 UST Growling Tigers men's basketball team who won the title against the heavily favored Ateneo Blue Eagles 2–1. He also won the Sixth Man of the Year award for that season. Ababou was crowned the Season MVP on his final year with the Tigers.

== Professional career ==
=== Barako Bull Energy (2011–12) ===
In the 2011 PBA draft, he was drafted 10th overall by the Barako Bull Energy. In his first game with the Energy he scored 20 points on 8 of 13 FG as he led the Energy to a victory against the Barangay Ginebra Kings, 88–75. Ababou became a key player for the Energy since then and entered the starting lineup. The Energy made the quarterfinals but were knocked off by the Talk 'N Text Tropang Texters who had a twice-to-beat advantage.

=== Barangay Ginebra Kings (2012–15) ===
Ababou was traded from the Energy to the Barangay Ginebra Kings alongside Kerby Raymundo from the B-Meg Llamados. The Llamados got JC Intal from the Kings while the Energy got Ronald Tubid and Reil Cervantes from the Kings. He participated in the 2012 Rookies/Sophomores/Juniors vs Veterans Game during the 2012 All-Star Weekend. In that game, him and James Yap of the Veterans team both scored 44 points, breaking Samboy Lim's record of most points scored in an All-Star game. The record would eventually be broken by Terrence Romeo in 2018. He helped Ginebra reach the Finals berth playoff in the 2012 Governors' Cup. At the end of his rookie season, he was named to the All-Rookie Team.

Early into his second season, he tore his ACL. He was out for ten months. He was almost traded for Barako Bull's 2013 1st-round pick, but the trade was altered, and Rico Maierhofer and Willy Wilson were sent instead. He returned with 16 points in 17 minutes in a win over the San Mig Coffee Mixers.

=== Return to Barako (2015) ===
In March 2015, Ababou and James Forrester were traded for the 1st-round draft pick of the Barako Bull Energy from Barangay Ginebra San Miguel; the first trade made under the leadership of Ginebra's new head coach Frankie Lim. He helped Barako Bull make the 2015 Governors' Cup quarterfinals.

=== TNT Franchise (2015–16) ===
On October 8, 2015, the PBA office approved the trade that sent Ababou to the Talk 'N Text Tropang Texters for a 2016 second-round pick.

=== Constant trades (2016–17) ===
On November 14, 2016, Ababou was traded by the TNT to the Blackwater Elite for Frank Golla. In 2017, he was traded to the GlobalPort Batang Pier for KG Canaleta. He debuted with 17 points in a loss to Ginebra. Later that year, he was involved in a three-team trade that sent him to the Phoenix Fuel Masters. He failed to get a new contract with Phoenix and became a free agent.

=== Kia Picanto / Columbian Dyip (2017–18) ===
Ababou was able to sign a one-conference deal with the Kia Picanto. Before the start of the 2019 season, he was left off the roster.

=== PBA return bid and retirement (2021) ===
Ababou attempted to return to the PBA via its 3x3 tournament, joining guest team Platinum Karaoke in late 2021. However he got injured ten days prior to the tournament. Riddled by injuries for a significant part of his career, Ababou decided to retire from competitive basketball.

== PBA career statistics ==
Legend
GP	Games played	MPG	Minutes per game
FG%	Field-goal percentage	3P%	3-point field-goal percentage	FT%	Free-throw percentage
RPG	Rebounds per game	APG	Assists per game	SPG	Steals per game
BPG	Blocks per game	PPG	Points per game	**Bold**	Career high

=== Season-by-season averages ===
Year	Team	GP	MPG	FG%	3P%	FT%	RPG	APG	SPG	BPG	PPG
2011–12	Barako Bull	**42**	**22.6**	.406	.299	.816	**3.1**	**.7**	.2	.3	**8.0**
2011–12	Barangay Ginebra	**42**	**22.6**	.406	.299	.816	**3.1**	**.7**	.2	.3	**8.0**
2012–13	Barangay Ginebra	6	8.5	.267	.222	**1.000**	1.2	.2	.0	**.5**	2.7
2013–14	Barangay Ginebra	27	9.3	.317	.235	.727	1.1	.3	.3	.1	2.9
2014–15	Barangay Ginebra	18	10.8	.400	.387	.875	1.1	.2	.2	.0	3.7
2014–15	Barako Bull	18	10.8	.400	.387	.875	1.1	.2	.2	.0	3.7
2015–16	TNT	24	8.4	**.438**	**.389**	**1.000**	.5	.4	.2	.3	2.8
2016–17	Blackwater	26	9.8	.347	.386	.750	1.4	.3	.1	.1	2.8
2016–17	GlobalPort	26	9.8	.347	.386	.750	1.4	.3	.1	.1	2.8
2016–17	Phoenix	26	9.8	.347	.386	.750	1.4	.3	.1	.1	2.8
2017–18	Kia / Columbian	27	9.7	.384	.222	.786	.4	.2	**.4**	.1	2.8
Career		170	12.7	.384	.309	.819	1.5	.4	.2	.2	4.2

== 3x3 career ==
=== Chooks-to-Go Pilipinas 3x3 (2019–2020) ===
Ababou then played for the Pasig Grindhouse Kings beginning in the President's Cup. He then joined the Big Boss Cement–Porac MSC Green Gorillas.

=== PBA 3x3 ===
In 2021, Ababou joined Platinum Karaoke in the PBA 3x3. Just before the season started, he had an Achilles injury. In 2022, he left for the US to be with his family.

== International career ==
In 2004, Ababou played for the RP Youth Team, competing in the 2004 Southeast Asia Junior Basketball Championship and in that year's Asia Basketball Confederation (ABC) Junior Men's Championship.

Immediately after his collegiate career with the Tigers ended, Ababou was called to join the Smart Gilas Philippines men's national basketball team together with the likes of Chris Tiu, JVee Casio, Mac Baracael and Mark Barroca, players whom he faced during his college career. However, his tenure with Smart Gilas did not go well as he had limited playing time with the team. Also, the arrival of Marcio Lassiter and Chris Lutz to Smart Gilas did not bode well with Ababou as his playing time grew even more limited.

== Personal life ==
Ababou is a Christian. He leads Bible studies with other PBA players.

Ababou also owns several business ventures. In 2022, he was an analyst for the broadcast of UAAP Season 84, and also commentated on PBA games.

Ababou is married. In 2022, he moved to California to join his family, who had earlier migrated to the United States.
