= Ryan Araña =

Filipino basketball player

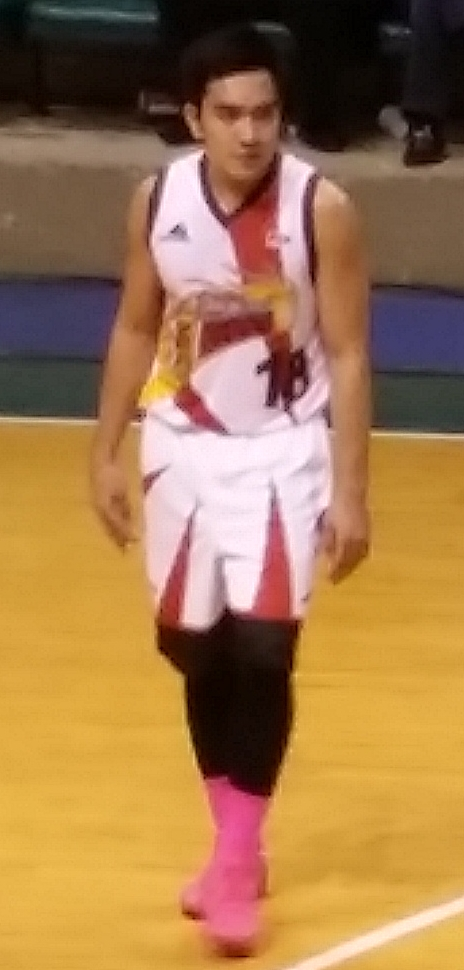

Personal information
- Born: March 23, 1984 (age 42) Tondo, Manila, Philippines
- Listed height: 6 ft 2 in (1.88 m)
- Listed weight: 180 lb (82 kg)

Career information
- High school: CDSL (Quezon City)
- College: De La Salle
- PBA draft: 2007: 2nd round, 12th overall pick
- Drafted by: Welcoat Dragons
- Playing career: 2007–2020
- Position: Shooting guard

Career history
- 2007–2015: Welcoat Dragons / Rain or Shine Elasto Painters
- 2015–2016: San Miguel Beermen
- 2016–2017: Mahindra Floodbuster
- 2017–2019: GlobalPort/NorthPort Batang Pier
- 2020: Rain or Shine Elasto Painters

Career highlights
- 2× PBA champion (2012 Governors', 2015–16 Philippine)
Medals
Men's basketball
Representing Philippines
Southeast Asian Games
Gold medal – first place	2007 Nakhon Ratchasima	Team

Ryan T. Araña (born March 23, 1984) is a Filipino former professional basketball player. He played for four teams during his career in the Philippine Basketball Association (PBA). Araña played college basketball at the De La Salle University. He was drafted with the twelfth overall pick in the second round of the 2007 PBA draft by the Welcoat Dragons.

== High school career ==
Araña was born in Tondo, Manila. He started playing basketball at the age of seven. He looked up to Robert Jaworski and Manu Ginóbili.

In high school, Araña played for the Colegio de San Lorenzo Baby Griffins in the NCRAA. He considered going to Ateneo De Manila for college, but after trying out with De La Salle, he decided to play for DLSU.

== College career ==
As a member of the DLSU Green Archers, Araña got to team up with TY Tang and Mac Cardona, who he looked up to, and joined a rookie class that included JVee Casio and Jerwin Gaco. He and Tang were the Archers' starting backcourt. He was a member of the team that won the UAAP championship in 2004, but it was recalled due to technicalities. In 2006, he was no longer eligible to reenroll at La Salle after failing 24 units, ending his college career.

== Professional career ==
=== Welcoat Dragons / Rain or Shine Elasto Painters (2007–2015) ===
Araña was drafted by the Welcoat Dragons twelfth overall in the 2007 PBA draft. With the team, he established his reputation as a gutsy perimeter defender in the league. He contributed 7.7 points in his rookie season. In 2009, he scored a career-high 25 points in a loss to the Burger King Whoppers, but missed what could have been the game-winning free throw.

In 2012, Araña became a PBA champion when his team won the 2012 Governors' Cup. He averaged five points, three rebounds, and two assists in 18 minutes along with his defense during that run. That year, he was also fined P5,000 for kicking Meralco Bolts forward Cliff Hodge in the groin during their game.

In 2013, Araña and Rain or Shine import Bruno Šundov each scored 20 points to lead the team to a win over Meralco. When his scorer teammate Jeff Chan got injured, he stepped up in scoring. He scored 12 of his 16 points in the fourth quarter to send Rain or Shine to the 2013 Governors' Cup semifinals. In the semis, Rain or Shine lost to the Petron Blaze Boosters in four games in a best-of-five series. With them eliminated, Rain or Shine failed to defend its Governors' Cup title.

Rain or Shine rematched with Petron during the 2013–14 Philippine Cup semifinals. In Game 5, Araña, along with Chan and Paul Lee, combined for 43 points on six triples to eliminate Petron. During the finals, he injured his collar bone in Game 2. He missed Game 3, but returned for Game 4. Despite his return, Rain or Shine failed to win the championship, and the San Mig Coffee Mixers became Philippine Cup champions. They met again in the 2014 Governors' Cup finals, where San Mig beat them once again, and got a Grand Slam.

In a preseason game, Araña and NLEX Road Warrior center Enrico Villanueva got into a scuffle near the end of the first quarter. He got a bloody nose while Villanueva got bruises and a referee was accidentally kicked. The game was stopped, and both players apologized. He was fined P40,000 for his actions. During the 2014–15 Philippine Cup, he missed some games due to a hamstring injury. In the 2015 Commissioner's Cup, Rain or Shine returned to the finals. After game 3 of the finals, he was challenged by the Talk 'N Text Tropang Texters' import Ivan Johnson to a fight in the Araneta Coliseum hallway. Araña's teammates prevented the fight from happening.

=== San Miguel Beermen (2015–2016) ===
In September 2015, Araña was traded by Rain or Shine to Barako Bull Energy in exchange for Barako Bull's 2016 second-round pick, but was later traded to the San Miguel Beermen for Ronald Pascual. Rain or Shine did the trade to clear space for incoming players. According to Araña, his role with the Beermen would be more on his defense and hustle and less on scoring. It took him some time to get adjusted to the trade, as he had to adjust to going against his former teammates. In Game 5 of the 2015–16 Philippine Cup semifinals, he scored eight points, five rebounds, and five assists against his former team as SMB coasted to the win. From there, SMB made it to the finals, and despite losing star player June Mar Fajardo for four games, and going down 0–3, they were still able to win the championship.

=== Mahindra Floodbuster (2016–2017) ===
In November 2016, Araña was traded by San Miguel along with a 2017 1st-round pick to the Mahindra Floodbuster in exchange for RR Garcia and Keith Agovida in a three-team trade. In a Christmas Day game against the Blackwater Elite, he scored 19 points (with seven of those in overtime) to help Mahindra get its first win of the season. Prior to the start of the 2017 Governors' Cup, he was placed on the free agency list by the team.

=== GlobalPort Batang Pier / NorthPort Batang Pier (2017–2019) ===
In 2017, Araña signed with GlobalPort Batang Pier as a free agent. There he reunited with Franz Pumaren, who coached him when he was still with DLSU. He scored 13 points while making all five of his shots in a win over the Phoenix Fuel Masters. He then had 16 in a win over the Magnolia Hotshots. In their quarterfinals game against Rain or Shine, he landed badly on his back, and missed some games. By the Governors' Cup, he was no longer on their roster.

=== Rain or Shine Elasto Painters (2020) ===
In 2020, Araña was back with Rain or Shine Elasto Painters as a free agent on a one-conference deal. It was during this time that he considered retiring. Prior to entering the PBA bubble for the 2020 season, his father died, in the same year he lost his father-in-law. This gave him motivation throughout the season. During the season in the bubble's hotel rooms, he opened a sari-sari store with teammate Beau Belga, and pranked different PBA players by dressing up as Sadako from 'The Ring'. However, Rain or Shine was eliminated in the quarterfinals by Barangay Ginebra San Miguel. His contract was not renewed at the end of the season.

== PBA career statistics ==
Legend
GP	Games played	MPG	Minutes per game
FG%	Field-goal percentage	3P%	3-point field-goal percentage	FT%	Free-throw percentage
RPG	Rebounds per game	APG	Assists per game	SPG	Steals per game
BPG	Blocks per game	PPG	Points per game	**Bold**	Career high

=== Season-by-season averages ===
Year	Team	GP	MPG	FG%	3P%	FT%	RPG	APG	SPG	BPG	PPG
2007–08	Welcoat	34	20.8	.446	.216	.566	3.3	1.1	.4	.2	7.7
2008–09	Rain or Shine	44	19.5	.417	.360	.534	3.5	1.5	.4	.1	7.8
2009–10	Rain or Shine	51	**21.6**	.415	.289	.656	**3.6**	1.6	**.6**	.1	**9.2**
2010–11	Rain or Shine	38	17.9	.459	.333	.613	2.9	**2.2**	.4	.1	7.4
2011–12	Rain or Shine	51	19.7	.412	.317	.584	3.5	1.8	.5	**.3**	6.4
2012–13	Rain or Shine	55	18.9	.411	.299	.580	2.8	1.2	.5	.1	7.4
2013–14	Rain or Shine	**59**	19.6	.397	.288	.568	2.7	2.1	.5	.2	6.5
2014–15	Rain or Shine	49	14.5	.396	.253	.625	2.1	.9	.4	.0	4.7
2015–16	San Miguel	48	10.6	.384	**.375**	.500	1.7	.6	.2	.1	2.5
2016–17	Mahindra	22	16.9	.370	.306	**.786**	3.2	.9	.3	.1	5.5
2016–17	GlobalPort	22	16.9	.370	.306	**.786**	3.2	.9	.3	.1	5.5
2017–18	GlobalPort / NorthPort	29	11.1	.368	.241	.500	2.3	1.2	**.6**	.1	3.3
2019	NorthPort	11	7.9	.219	.167	.500	1.8	.5	.5	.2	1.8
2020	Rain or Shine	7	8.7	**.471**	.250	.500	1.4	.9	.4	.0	2.9
Career		498	17.3	.410	.294	.592	2.8	1.4	.4	.1	6.2

== Television appearances ==
In 2020, Araña appeared on the "Bawal Judgmental" segment of an Eat Bulaga! episode. He appeared on another episode of that show the following year, this time on the "Cash Landing on You" segment.

== Personal life ==
Araña was once rumored to be a couple with Miss Philippines Fire 2011 Michelle Gavagan. Currently, he is married to Erika Ono and they have a son, Thanos. In 2020, their daughter Marvel was born.

Araña owns a farm in Tanay, Rizal along with other small businesses. He is also interested in photography as a hobby.

=== Fashion ===
Araña is known for wearing pink shoes during his games. In his second year in the league, he started wearing pink shoes in honor of his aunt who is a survivor of breast cancer. With the positive feedback from social media, he continued wearing those shoes and donated half of his bonuses to a breast cancer foundation. In his time with the Mahindra Enforcer, he switched from wearing his pink shoes to wearing yellow shoes, as a sign that he was changing his image and his play style from being a slasher to a shooter. When his father died in 2020, he wore pink customized Nikes as a tribute to him.

Araña is also known for his pregame outfits. In 2018, he tried a getup of a suit and shorts prior to a game, which Lebron James had worn prior to Game 1 of that year's NBA Finals. He didn't get to play, but he was quoted as saying"May kasabihan nga sila, 'If you don’t perform, japorms.(There is an adage, 'If you don't perform, japorms)'". He has encouraged his teammates to dress up before games. In October of that same year, he, along with teammates Jeric Teng and Jonathan Grey, dressed up as characters from the Netflix series 'Money Heist'.

In 2015, Araña was featured on the centerfold of the September 2015 issue of Cosmopolitan Philippines.
