= Jamelle Cornley =

American basketball player

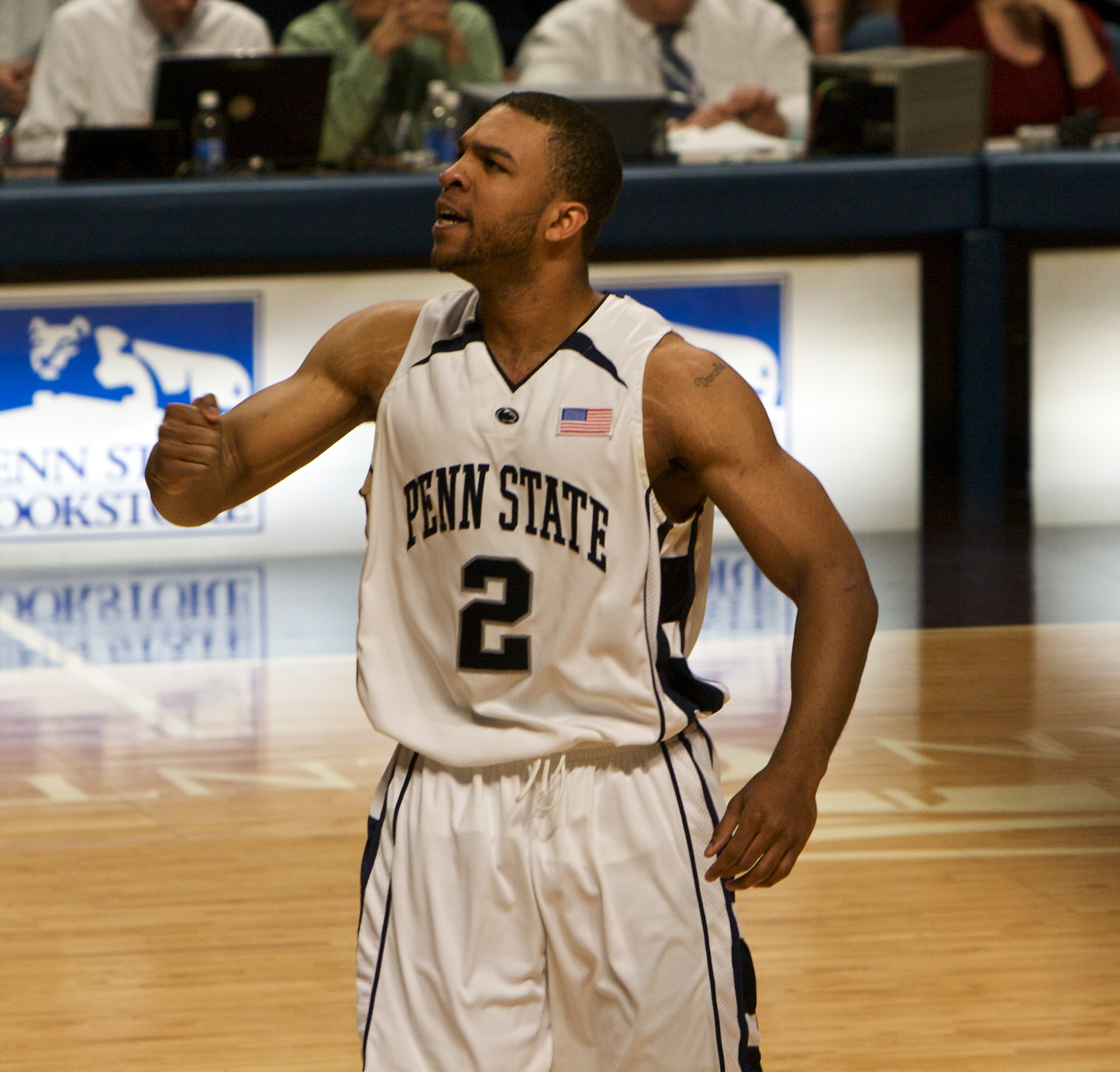

Personal information
- Born: April 18, 1987 (age 38) Normal, Illinois, U.S.
- Listed height: 6 ft 5 in (1.96 m)
- Listed weight: 215 lb (98 kg)

Career information
- High school: Brookhaven (Columbus, Ohio)
- College: Penn State (2005–2009)
- NBA draft: 2009: undrafted
- Playing career: 2009–2019
- Position: Small forward

Career history
- 2009–2010: Fort Wayne Mad Ants
- 2012: Rain or Shine Elasto Painters
- 2012: JL Bourg
- 2015: Caballeros de Culiacán
- 2015–2016: Incheon Electroland Elephants
- 2017–2018: Atletico Echague Parana
- 2018: Club Malvín
- 2019: Español de Talca

Career highlights
- PBA champion (2012 Governors'); PBA Best Import (2012 Governors'); Second-team All-Big Ten – Media (2009); Third-team All-Big Ten – Media (2008); Third-team All-Big Ten – Coaches (2009); Big Ten Freshman of the Year (2006); Big Ten All-Freshman Team (2006); National Invitation Tournament MVP (2009)

Jamelle Cornley (born April 18, 1987) is an American former professional basketball player. He played collegiately at Penn State.

== Playing career ==
He played as an import for the Rain or Shine Elasto Painters in the Philippine Basketball Association during the 2012 PBA Governors' Cup. During his tenure in the Philippines, he was awarded as the Bobby Parks PBA Best Import of the Conference for his contribution to the Elasto Painters. He helped the Painters to capture its first championship (2012 Governor's Cup).

In December 2017, Cornley signed with Atlético Echagüe, a club based in Argentina. In October 2018, he signed with his actual club, Club Malvín, based in Uruguay.
