= Reil Cervantes =

Filipino basketball player

Free agent
- Position: Power forward

Personal information
- Born: August 16, 1986 (age 40) Virac, Catanduanes, Philippines
- Listed height: 6 ft 4 in (1.93 m)
- Listed weight: 198 lb (90 kg)

Career information
- High school: United Institute (Daraga, Albay)
- College: FEU
- PBA draft: 2011: 1st round, 9th overall pick
- Drafted by: Barangay Ginebra Kings
- Playing career: 2011–present

Career history
- 2011–2012: Barangay Ginebra Kings
- 2012–2014: Barako Bull Energy
- 2014–2015: Kia Carnival
- 2015–2017: Blackwater Elite
- 2017: Westports Malaysia Dragons
- 2018–2019: Manila Stars
- 2019–2021: Pampanga Giant Lanterns
- 2021: Cam Sur Express
- 2021: GlobalPort ZValientes–MisOr
- 2022: Bicol Spicy Oragons
- 2022–2025: Caloocan Excellence / Batang Kankaloo / Supremos
- 2026: Iloilo United Royals

Career highlights
- PSL champion (2025)

Reil T. Cervantes (born August 16, 1986) is a Filipino professional basketball player who last played for the Iloilo United Royals of the Maharlika Pilipinas Basketball League (MPBL). He was drafted 9th by Barangay Ginebra Kings in the 2011 PBA draft.

In 2014, Cervantes was drafted 2nd overall by Kia Sorento in the 2014 PBA Expansion Draft.

== PBA career statistics ==
Legend
GP	Games played	MPG	Minutes per game
FG%	Field-goal percentage	3P%	3-point field-goal percentage	FT%	Free-throw percentage
RPG	Rebounds per game	APG	Assists per game	SPG	Steals per game
BPG	Blocks per game	PPG	Points per game	**Bold**	Career high

Correct as of September 21, 2016

=== Season-by-season averages ===
Year	Team	GP	MPG	FG%	3P%	FT%	RPG	APG	SPG	BPG	PPG
2011–12	Barangay Ginebra	13	5.6	.333	.000	.429	1.7	.1	.0	.0	1.8
2012–13	Barako Bull	4	5.5	.167	.000	.000	.5	.0	.0	.0	0.5
2014–15	Kia / Blackwater	**29**	**24.8**	.361	.264	.641	**4.5**	**1.3**	.2	**.1**	**11.9**
2015–16	Blackwater	**29**	20.4	**.368**	**.328**	**.803**	2.6	.8	**.3**	.0	10.7
Career		75	18.8	.361	.296	.685	3.1	.8	.2	.1	9.1
