= 2011–12 PBA Philippine Cup =

Philippine basketball tournament

- Duration: October 2, 2011 – January 29, 2012
- TV partner(s): Sports5 - AKTV on IBC (Local); Aksyon TV International (International)

Finals
- Champions: Talk 'N Text Tropang Texters
- Runners-up: Powerade Tigers

Awards
- Best Player: Gary David (Powerade Tigers)
- Finals MVP: Larry Fonacier (Talk 'N Text Tropang Texters)

PBA Philippine Cup chronology
- < 2010–11 2012–13 >

PBA conference chronology
- < 2011 Governors' 2012 Commissioner's >

The 2011–12 Philippine Basketball Association (PBA) Philippine Cup is the first conference of the 2011–12 PBA season. The tournament started on October 2, 2011, with Rain or Shine Elasto Painters against Barangay Ginebra Kings as the opening game. The tournament is an All-Filipino format, which does not require an import or a pure-foreign player for each team.

== Format ==
The following format was observed for the duration of the tournament:

- Two-round eliminations, with each team playing 14 games. The teams are divided into two groups on the basis of their draft order prior to the trades. Each team will play teams within their group once, while they will play teams from the other group twice.
  - Group A:
    - Powerade Tigers (#1)
    - Rain or Shine Elasto Painters (#4)
    - B-Meg Llamados (#5)
    - Petron Blaze Boosters (#8)
    - Barangay Ginebra Kings (#9)
  - Group B:
    - Barako Bull Energy (#2)
    - Meralco Bolts (#3)
    - Alaska Aces (#6)
    - Talk 'N Text Tropang Texters (#7)
    - Shopinas.com Clickers (#10)
- Top eight teams will advance to the quarterfinals. In case of tie, playoffs will be held only for the #2 and #8 seeds.
- Quarterfinals:
  - QF1: #1 seed vs #8 seed (#1 seed twice-to-beat)
  - QF2: #2 seed vs #7 seed (#1 seed twice-to-beat)
  - QF3: #3 seed vs #6 seed (best-of-3 series)
  - QF4: #4 seed vs #5 seed (best-of-3 series)
- Semifinals (best-of-7 series):
  - SF1: QF1 vs. QF4 winners
  - SF2: QF2 vs. QF3 winners
- Finals (best-of-7 series)
  - Winners of the semifinals

== Elimination round ==
=== Team standings ===
Pos	Team	W	L	PCT	GB	Qualification
1	B-Meg Llamados	10	4	.714 (Note: Head-to-head record: B-Meg 1–1 Talk 'N Text (B-Meg +8))	—	Twice-to-beat in the quarterfinals
2	Talk 'N Text Tropang Texters	10	4	.714	—	Twice-to-beat in the quarterfinals
3	Petron Blaze Boosters	9	5	.643 (Note: Head-to-head differential: Petron +8, Barangay Ginebra +1, Rain or Shine −9)	1	Best-of-three quarterfinals
4	Barangay Ginebra San Miguel	9	5	.643	1	Best-of-three quarterfinals
5	Rain or Shine Elasto Painters	9	5	.643	1	Best-of-three quarterfinals
6	Meralco Bolts	8	6	.571	2	Best-of-three quarterfinals
7	Barako Bull Energy Cola	6	8	.429 (Note: Head-to-head record: Barako Bull 1–1 Powerade (Barako Bull +35))	4	Twice-to-win in the quarterfinals
8	Powerade Tigers	6	8	.429	4	Twice-to-win in the quarterfinals
9	Alaska Aces	3	11	.214	7	
10	Shopinas.com Clickers	0	14	.000	10	

Source: PBA.ph

=== Results ===
Team	ALA	BMEG	BBE	BGK	MER	PBB	POW	ROS	SHO	TNT
Alaska		75–81	93–72	72–83	75–81	80–86	67–79	84–120	86–80	97–100
B-Meg	92–89**		84–87*	88–76	78–84	69–73	97–80	102–100	76–65	94–96
Barako Bull	—	90–91		88–75	75–83	83–95	117–78	81–93	96–78	100–86
Barangay Ginebra	85–77	—	88–83		87–93	91–89	73–72	93–94	94–90*	71–86
Meralco	—	79–95	—	71–81		80–70	98–96	84–89	79–72	80–98
Petron Blaze	90–85	—	75–66	—	76–75		94–108	90–80	98–87	86–96
Powerade	111–121	—	99–95	—	98–100	—		93–96	102–84	86–95
Rain or Shine	91–85	—	102–106	—	139–95	—	—		96–75	98–107
Shopinas.com	—	74–86	—	79–92	—	77–102	84–102	81–88		83–96
Talk 'N Text	—	104–114	—	82–96	—	80–78	96–131	106–104*	—	

Legend: Blue = left column team win; Red = top row team win.
Matches with lighter background shading were decided after overtime.

== Bracket ==
Quarterfinals
(#1 twice-to-beat)
1	B-Meg	88	123
8	Powerade	97	131*
(Best-of-3)
4	Barangay Ginebra	0
5	Rain or Shine	2
(#2 twice-to-beat)
2	Talk 'N Text	81
7	Barako Bull	79
(Best-of-3)
3	Petron Blaze	2
6	Meralco	0

Semifinals (Best-of-7)
8	Powerade	4
5	Rain or Shine	3
2	Talk 'N Text	4
3	Petron Blaze	3

Finals (Best-of-7)
8	Powerade	1
2	Talk 'N Text	4

*Game went into overtime

== Quarterfinals ==
=== (1) B-Meg vs. (8) Powerade ===
December 14

B-Meg Llamados 88, Powerade Tigers 97

Smart Araneta Coliseum, Quezon City

December 18

B-Meg Llamados 123, Powerade Tigers 131 (OT)
Powerade wins series in two games

Smart Araneta Coliseum, Quezon City

=== (2) Talk 'N Text vs. (7) Barako Bull ===
December 14

Talk 'N Text Tropang Texters 81, Barako Bull Energy 79
Talk 'N Text wins series in one game

Smart Araneta Coliseum, Quezon City

=== (3) Petron Blaze vs. (6) Meralco ===
December 16

Petron Blaze Boosters 91, Meralco Bolts 84

Smart Araneta Coliseum, Quezon City

December 21

Petron Blaze Boosters 80, Meralco Bolts 64
Petron wins series 2–0

Ynares Center, Antipolo

=== (4) Barangay Ginebra vs. (5) Rain or Shine ===
December 16

Barangay Ginebra Kings 105, Rain or Shine Elasto Painters 112 (OT)

Smart Araneta Coliseum, Quezon City

December 21

Barangay Ginebra Kings 91, Rain or Shine Elasto Painters 106
Rain or Shine wins series 2–0

Ynares Center, Antipolo

== Semifinals ==
=== (2) Talk 'N Text vs. (3) Petron Blaze ===
January 5

Talk 'N Text Tropang Texters 87, Petron Blaze Boosters 83

Cuneta Astrodome, Pasay

January 7

Talk 'N Text Tropang Texters 89, Petron Blaze Boosters 91

Smart Araneta Coliseum, Quezon City

January 9

Talk 'N Text Tropang Texters 93, Petron Blaze Boosters 95

Cuneta Astrodome, Pasay

January 11

Talk 'N Text Tropang Texters 82, Petron Blaze Boosters 85

Smart Araneta Coliseum, Quezon City

January 13

Talk 'N Text Tropang Texters 93, Petron Blaze Boosters 91

Smart Araneta Coliseum, Quezon City

January 15

Talk 'N Text Tropang Texters 111, Petron Blaze Boosters 108

Smart Araneta Coliseum, Quezon City

January 18

Talk 'N Text Tropang Texters 92, Petron Blaze Boosters 91
Talk 'N Text wins series 4–3

Cuneta Astrodome, Pasay

=== (5) Rain or Shine vs. (8) Powerade ===
January 4

Rain or Shine Elasto Painters 114, Powerade Tigers 97

Cuneta Astrodome, Pasay

January 6

Rain or Shine Elasto Painters 113, Powerade Tigers 121

Smart Araneta Coliseum, Quezon City

January 8

Rain or Shine Elasto Painters 99, Powerade Tigers 104 (OT)

Smart Araneta Coliseum, Quezon City

January 10

Rain or Shine Elasto Painters 110, Powerade Tigers 95

Smart Araneta Coliseum, Quezon City

January 13

Rain or Shine Elasto Painters 108, Powerade Tigers 110

Smart Araneta Coliseum, Quezon City

January 15

Rain or Shine Elasto Painters 112, Powerade Tigers 98

Smart Araneta Coliseum, Quezon City

January 18

Rain or Shine Elasto Painters 98, Powerade Tigers 107
Powerade wins series 4–3

Cuneta Astrodome, Pasay

== Finals ==
January 20

Talk 'N Text Tropang Texters 116, Powerade Tigers 100

Davao del Sur Coliseum, Digos, Davao del Sur

January 23

Talk 'N Text Tropang Texters 102, Powerade Tigers 96

Smart Araneta Coliseum, Quezon City

January 25

Talk 'N Text Tropang Texters 133, Powerade Tigers 126 (OT)

Smart Araneta Coliseum, Quezon City

January 27

Talk 'N Text Tropang Texters 97, Powerade Tigers 100

Smart Araneta Coliseum, Quezon City

January 29

Talk 'N Text Tropang Texters 110, Powerade Tigers 101
Talk 'N Text wins series 4–1

Smart Araneta Coliseum, Quezon City

== Statistical leaders ==
=== Eliminations ===
Category	Player	Team	Games played	Totals	Average
Points per game	Gary David	Powerade Tigers	14	291	20.79
Rebounds per game	Arwind Santos	Petron Blaze Boosters	14	178	12.31
Assists per game	Alex Cabagnot	Petron Blaze Boosters	14	100	7.14
Steals per game	Chris Lutz	Petron Blaze Boosters	7	16	2.00
Blocks per game	Japeth Aguilar	Talk 'N Text Tropang Texters	14	33	2.36
3-pt field goal percentage	Celino Cruz	Powerade Tigers	11	13/25	0.520
Free throw percentage	JV Casio	Powerade Tigers	11	20/22	0.909
Minutes per game	Sonny Thoss	Alaska Aces	14	529	37.79

== Awards ==
=== Conference ===
- Best Player of the Conference: Gary David (Powerade)
- Finals MVP: Larry Fonacier (Talk 'N Text)

=== Players of the Week ===
Week	Player	Ref.
October 2–9	Alex Cabagnot (Petron Blaze Boosters)	
October 10–16	Harvey Carey (Talk 'N Text Tropang Texters)	
October 17–23	Jeffrei Chan (Rain or Shine Elasto Painters)	
October 24–30	Gary David (Powerade Tigers)	
October 31 – November 6	Joseph Yeo (Petron Blaze Boosters)	
November 7–13	James Yap (B-Meg Llamados)	
November 14–20	Jayson Castro (Talk 'N Text Tropang Texters)	
November 21–27	Gary David (Powerade Tigers)	
November 28 – December 4	James Yap (B-Meg Llamados)	
December 5–11	Mike Cortez (Barangay Ginebra Kings)	
December 12–18	Gary David (Powerade Tigers)	
January 9–15	Jimmy Alapag (Talk 'N Text Tropang Texters)	
