= 2012 PBA Governors' Cup =

Third conference of the 2011–12 PBA season

- Duration: May 20 – August 5, 2012
- TV partner(s): Sports5 – AKTV on IBC (Local); Aksyon TV International (International)

Finals
- Champions: Rain or Shine Elasto Painters
- Runners-up: B-Meg Llamados

Awards
- Best Player: Mark Caguioa (Barangay Ginebra Kings)
- Best Import: Jamelle Cornley (Rain or Shine Elasto Painters)
- Finals MVP: Jeffrei Chan (Rain or Shine Elasto Painters)

PBA Governors' Cup chronology
- < 2011 2013 >

PBA conference chronology
- < 2012 Commissioner's 2012–13 Philippine >

The 2012 Philippine Basketball Association (PBA) Governors' Cup, was the third and last conference of the 2011–12 PBA season. The tournament started on May 20 and culminated on August 5 with the Rain or Shine Elasto Painters team defeating the B-Meg Llamados team by 4 games to 3.

The tournament was an import-laden format, which allowed an import or a pure-foreign player for each team and with a height limit of 6-foot-5.

== Format ==
The following format was observed for the duration of the conference:

- Single-round robin eliminations; 9 games per team; Teams are then seeded by basis on win–loss records.
- The top six teams after the eliminations will advance to the semifinals. In case of a tie, a playoff will be held only for the #6 seed.
- Semifinals will be a single round-robin affair with the remaining six teams. Results from the eliminations will be carried over. A playoff incentive for a finals berth will be given to the team that will win at least four of their five semifinal games that does not finish within the top two. In case of a tie, a playoff will be held only for the #2 seed.
- The top two teams (or the #1 team and the winner of the playoff between team with at least 4 semifinal wins and the #2 team) will face each other in a best-of-seven championship series.

== Elimination round ==
=== Team standings ===
Pos	Team	W	L	PCT	GB	Qualification
1	Rain or Shine Elasto Painters	8	1	.889	—	Semifinal round
2	B-Meg Llamados	6	3	.667	2	Semifinal round
3	Talk 'N Text Tropang Texters	5	4	.556 (Note: Head-to-head differential: Talk 'N Text +18, Barangay Ginebra 0, Petron −18)	3	Semifinal round
4	Barangay Ginebra Kings	5	4	.556	3	Semifinal round
5	Petron Blaze Boosters	5	4	.556	3	Semifinal round
6	Meralco Bolts	4	5	.444 (Note: Head-to-head differential: Meralco +11, Barako Bull +8, Powerade −18; sixth seed playoffs: Powerade 99–95 Barako Bull, Meralco 94–86 Powerade)	4	Semifinal round
7	Powerade Tigers	4	5	.444	4	
8	Barako Bull Energy Cola	4	5	.444	4	
9	Alaska Aces	2	7	.222 (Note: Head-to-head record: Alaska 1–0 Air21)	6	
10	Air21 Express	2	7	.222	6	

Source: PBA.ph

=== Schedule ===
Team ╲ Game	1	2	3	4	5	6	7	8	9
Air21	BGK	TNT	ROS	BMEG	BBE	MER	POW	ALA	PBB
Alaska	ROS	BBE	POW	PBB	MER	BMEG	TNT	BGK	A21
B-Meg	ROS	BGK	BBE	MER	A21	ALA	PBB	TNT	POW
Barako Bull	POW	ALA	BMEG	PBB	A21	ROS	TNT	BGK	MER
Barangay Ginebra	A21	BMEG	MER	ROS	PBB	POW	ALA	TNT	BBE
Meralco	TNT	PBB	BGK	BMEG	ALA	ROS	A21	POW	BBE
Petron Blaze	POW	MER	TNT	ALA	BBE	BGK	BMEG	ROS	A21
Powerade	PBB	BBE	ALA	TNT	ROS	BGK	A21	MER	BMEG
Rain or Shine	ALA	BMEG	A21	BGK	POW	MER	BBE	PBB	TNT
Talk 'N Text	MER	A21	PBB	POW	ALA	BBE	BGK	BMEG	ROS

= Win; = OT win; = Loss; = OT loss

=== Results ===
Team	A21	ALA	BMEG	BBE	BGK	MER	PBB	POW	ROS	TNT
Air21		80–110	78–91	100–109	85–103	77–106	97–98	128–121	92–106	97–86
Alaska	—		61–77	104–84	81–90	95–100	94–107	97–114	100–107	72–80
B-Meg	—	—		95–90	96–88	88–83	80–92	110–98*	94–100*	72–89
Barako Bull	—	—	—		91–102	81–79	111–107	106–101	90–100	89–109
Barangay Ginebra	—	—	—	—		100–73	83–80	83–86	90–93	111–113
Meralco	—	—	—	—	—		88–101	91–78	77–81	105–99
Petron Blaze	—	—	—	—	—	—		97–83	82–103	87–102
Powerade	—	—	—	—	—	—	—		104–98	110–105
Rain or Shine	—	—	—	—	—	—	—	—		92–90
Talk 'N Text	—	—	—	—	—	—	—	—	—	

Legend: Blue = left column team win; Red = top row team win.
Matches with lighter background shading were decided after overtime.

== Sixth seed playoffs ==
Three teams were tied for sixth, with only one team advancing. The three teams were first ranked by head-to-head quotient, with the best team drawing a bye to the second round, and the two worst teams playing in the first round.

First round
Barako Bull Energy	95
Powerade Tigers	99

Second round
Meralco Bolts	94
Powerade Tigers	86

=== First round ===
July 3

Barako Bull Energy 95, Powerade Tigers 99

Smart Araneta Coliseum, Quezon City

=== Second round ===
July 4

Meralco Bolts 94, Powerade Tigers 86

Smart Araneta Coliseum, Quezon City

== Semifinal round ==
=== Team standings ===
Overall standings
Pos	Team	W	L	PCT	GB	Qualification
1	Rain or Shine Elasto Painters	10	4	.714	—	Advance to finals (Note: If a team outside the top two teams wins four semifinal round games, then it and the second-placed team will playoff for the last finals berth; otherwise, the top 2 teams qualify outright.)
2	B-Meg Llamados	9	5	.643 (Note: Head-to-head record: B-Meg 2–0 Barangay Ginebra)	1	Guaranteed finals berth playoff
3	Barangay Ginebra Kings	9	5	.643	1	Qualify to finals berth playoff
4	Talk 'N Text Tropang Texters	8	6	.571	2	
5	Petron Blaze Boosters	6	8	.429 (Note: Head-to-head record: Meralco 1–1, Petron; Petron +12, Meralco −12)	4	
6	Meralco Bolts	6	8	.429	4	

Source: PBA.ph
Notes:

Semifinal round standings
Pos	Team	W	L	Qualification
1	Barangay Ginebra Kings	4	1	Qualify to finals berth playoff (Note: Finals berth playoff: B-Meg 74–72 Barangay Ginebra)
2	B-Meg Llamados	3	2	
3	Talk 'N Text Tropang Texters	3	2	
4	Rain or Shine Elasto Painters	2	3	
5	Meralco Bolts	2	3	
6	Petron Blaze Boosters	1	4	

Source: PBA.ph

=== Schedule ===
Team ╲ Game	1	2	3	4	5
B-Meg	TNT	PBB	MER	BGK	ROS
Barangay Ginebra	MER	PBB	ROS	BMEG	TNT
Meralco	BGK	ROS	TNT	BMEG	PBB
Petron Blaze	ROS	BGK	BMEG	TNT	MER
Rain or Shine	PBB	MER	BGK	TNT	BMEG
Talk 'N Text	BMEG	MER	PBB	ROS	BGK

= Win; = OT win; = Loss; = OT loss

=== Results ===
Team	BMEG	BGK	MER	PBB	ROS	TNT
B-Meg		82–70	101–104	104–93	82–92	94–91
Barangay Ginebra			89–76	87–85	95–86	73–71
Meralco				113–112	86–99	84–108
Petron Blaze					90–88	94–103
Rain or Shine						90–98
Talk 'N Text						

Legend: Blue = left column team win; Red = top row team win.

== Finals berth playoff ==
July 20

B-Meg Llamados 74, Barangay Ginebra Kings 72

Smart Araneta Coliseum, Quezon City

== Finals ==
July 22

Rain or Shine Elasto Painters 91, B-Meg Llamados 80

Smart Araneta Coliseum, Quezon City

July 25

Rain or Shine Elasto Painters 80, B-Meg Llamados 85

Smart Araneta Coliseum, Quezon City

July 27

Rain or Shine Elasto Painters 93, B-Meg Llamados 84

Smart Araneta Coliseum, Quezon City

July 29

Rain or Shine Elasto Painters 94, B-Meg Llamados 89

Smart Araneta Coliseum, Quezon City

August 1

Rain or Shine Elasto Painters 81, B-Meg Llamados 91

Smart Araneta Coliseum, Quezon City

August 3

Rain or Shine Elasto Painters 81, B-Meg Llamados 97

Smart Araneta Coliseum, Quezon City

August 5

Rain or Shine Elasto Painters 83, B-Meg Llamados 76
Rain or Shine wins series, 4–3

Smart Araneta Coliseum, Quezon City

== Imports ==
The following is the list of imports, which had played for their respective teams at least once, with the returning imports in italics. Highlighted are the imports who stayed with their respective teams for the entire conference.

Team	Name	Debuted	Last game	Record
Air21 Express	Zach Graham	May 23 (vs. Ginebra)	June 29 (vs. Petron Blaze)	2–7
Alaska Aces	Jason Forte	May 20 (vs. Rain or Shine)	June 27 (vs. Air21)	2–7
B-Meg Llamados	Marqus Blakely	May 25 (vs. Rain or Shine)	August 5 (vs. Rain or Shine)	13–9
Barako Bull Energy	Jamine Peterson	May 25 (vs. Powerade)	June 1 (vs. B-Meg)	1–2
Barako Bull Energy	LeRoy Hickerson	June 8 (vs. Petron Blaze)	July 3 (vs. Powerade)	3–3
Barangay Ginebra Kings	Cedric Bozeman	May 23 (vs. Air21)	July 20 (vs. B-Meg)	9–6
Meralco Bolts	Champ Oguchi	May 23 (vs. Talk 'N Text)	June 6 (vs. B-Meg)	2–3
Meralco Bolts	Mario West	June 10 (vs. Alaska)	July 15 (vs. Petron Blaze)	5–5
Petron Blaze Boosters	Eddie Basden	May 20 (vs. Powerade)	June 29 (vs. Air21)	5–4
Petron Blaze Boosters	Marcus Faison	July 6 (vs. Rain or Shine)	July 15 (vs. Meralco)	1–4
Powerade Tigers	Rashad McCants	May 20 (vs. Petron Blaze)	May 25 (vs. Barako Bull)	0–2
Powerade Tigers	Omar Sneed	June 1 (vs. Alaska)	July 4 (vs. Meralco)	5–4
Rain or Shine Elasto Painters	Jamelle Cornley	May 20 (vs. Alaska)	August 5 (vs. B-Meg)	14–7
Talk 'N Text Tropang Texters	Paul Harris	May 23 (vs. Meralco)	July 18 (vs. Ginebra)	8–6

== Awards ==
=== Conference ===
- Best Player of the Conference: Mark Caguioa (Barangay Ginebra Kings)
- Best Import of the Conference: Jamelle Cornley (Rain or Shine Elasto Painters)
- Finals MVP: Jeffrei Chan (Rain or Shine Elasto Painters)

=== Players of the Week ===
Week	Player	Ref.
May 20–27	Paul Lee (Rain or Shine Elasto Painters)	
May 28 – June 3	Gary David (Powerade Tigers)	
June 4–10	Gary David (Powerade Tigers)	
June 11–17	Jay Washington (Petron Blaze Boosters)	
June 18–24	Jayson Castro (Talk 'N Text Tropang Texters)	
June 25 – July 1	Paul Lee (Rain or Shine Elasto Painters)	
July 2–8	Mark Caguioa (Barangay Ginebra Kings)	
July 9–15	Marc Pingris (B-Meg Llamados)	
July 16–22	Jeffrei Chan (Rain or Shine Elasto Painters)	
