= 2013–14 Barangay Ginebra San Miguel season =

- Head coach: Ato Agustin (Philippine and Commissioner's Cup); Jeffrey Cariaso (Governors' Cup)
- Owner(s): Ginebra San Miguel, Inc. (a San Miguel Corporation subsidiary)

Philippine Cup results
- Record: 11–3 (78.6%)
- Place: 1st
- Playoff finish: Semifinalist (def. by San Mig Super Coffee, 3–4)

Commissioner's Cup results
- Record: 3–6 (33.3%)
- Place: 8th
- Playoff finish: Quarterfinalist (def. by Talk 'N Text in one game)

Governors' Cup results
- Record: 5–4 (55.6%)
- Place: 6th
- Playoff finish: Quarterfinalist (def. by Alaska in one game)

Barangay Ginebra San Miguel seasons

The 2013–14 Barangay Ginebra San Miguel season was the 35th season of the franchise in the Philippine Basketball Association (PBA).

== Key dates ==
- November 3: The 2013 PBA Draft took place in Midtown Atrium, Robinson Place Manila.
- April 29: Jeffrey Cariaso was designated as head coach. Olsen Racela was also transferred from San Mig Coffee to Ginebra to be the team's lead assistant coach. Ato Agustin was demoted to assistant coach.

== Draft picks ==
Round	Pick	Player	Position	Nationality	PBA D-League team	College
1	1	Greg Slaughter	C	United States	NLEX Road Warriors	Ateneo
1	4	James Forrester	SG	United States	Cagayan Rising Suns	Arellano
3	4	LA Revilla		Philippines		De La Salle
4	3	John Usita				Shoreline Community Coll.
5	3	Alvin Padilla		Philippines		UP Diliman
6	1	Jens Knuttel		Philippines		FEU

== Roster ==
2013–14 Barangay Ginebra San Miguel roster
Players
Coaches

Pos.	#	POB	Name	Height	Weight	DOB (YYYY–MM–DD)	From
F/C	0	(Philippines)	Bryan Faundo	6 ft 5 in (1.96 m)	220 lb (100 kg)		Letran
G/F	1	(Canada)	James Forrester	6 ft 2 in (1.88 m)	190 lb (86 kg)		Arellano
F/C	2	(Philippines)	Billy Mamaril	6 ft 6 in (1.98 m)	225 lb (102 kg)		Bakersfield
G	3	(Philippines)	Josh Urbiztondo	5 ft 10 in (1.78 m)	185 lb (84 kg)		Fresno Pacific
G	5	(Philippines)	LA Tenorio	5 ft 8 in (1.73 m)	155 lb (70 kg)		Ateneo
G	6	(Philippines)	Emman Monfort	5 ft 6 in (1.68 m)	132 lb (60 kg)		Ateneo
G	13	(Philippines)	Jayjay Helterbrand (C)	5 ft 11 in (1.80 m)	170 lb (77 kg)		Kentucky State
G	14	(Germany)	Jens Knuttel (R)	5 ft 9 in (1.75 m)	196 lb (89 kg)		Far Eastern
F/C	19	(Philippines)	Jay-R Reyes	6 ft 7 in (2.01 m)	215 lb (98 kg)		UP Diliman
C	20	(Philippines)	Greg Slaughter (R)	7 ft 0 in (2.13 m)	258 lb (117 kg)		Ateneo
F/C	25	(Philippines)	Japeth Aguilar	6 ft 9 in (2.06 m)	225 lb (102 kg)		Ateneo
F	33	(Philippines)	Dylan Ababou	6 ft 3 in (1.91 m)	185 lb (84 kg)		UST
F	34	(United States)	Chris Ellis	6 ft 4 in (1.93 m)	185 lb (84 kg)		Mary Hardin–Baylor
F	45	(Philippines)	Mac Baracael	6 ft 4 in (1.93 m)	190 lb (86 kg)		Far Eastern
G	47	(Philippines)	Mark Caguioa	6 ft 1 in (1.85 m)	190 lb (86 kg)		Glendale CC (CA)
F	21	(United States)	Leon Rodgers (CI)	6 ft 5 in (1.96 m)	216 lb (98 kg)		Northern Illinois
F/C	21	(United States)	Josh Powell (CI)	6 ft 9 in (2.06 m)	240 lb (109 kg)		NC State
F	15	(United States)	Gabe Freeman (CI)	6 ft 6 in (1.98 m)	205 lb (93 kg)		Mesa CC
F	30	(United States)	Zaccheus Mason (GI)	6 ft 6 in (1.98 m)	237 lb (108 kg)		Chattanooga

Head coach

- (United States) Jeffrey Cariaso (Sonoma State)

Assistant coach(es)

- (Philippines) Olsen Racela (Ateneo)
- (Philippines) Ato Agustin (Lyceum)
- (Philippines) Jorge Gallent (Far Eastern)

Team manager

- (Philippines) Alfrancis Chua^{[a]} (UST)

Legend

- (C) Team captain
- (CI) Commissioner's Cup Import
- (GI) Governors' Cup Import
- (EI) EASL Import
- (DP) Unsigned draft pick
- (FA) Free agent
- (IN) Inactive
- (S) Suspended
- (R) Rookie
- Injured

Roster

- ^{a} Chua also serves as Barangay Ginebra's alternate governor.

== Philippine Cup ==
=== Eliminations ===
==== Standings ====
Pos	Team	W	L	PCT	GB	Qualification
1	Barangay Ginebra San Miguel	11	3	.786 (Note: Head-to-head record: Barangay Ginebra 1–0 Rain or Shine)	—	Twice-to-beat in the quarterfinals
2	Rain or Shine Elasto Painters	11	3	.786	—	Twice-to-beat in the quarterfinals
3	Petron Blaze Boosters	10	4	.714	1	Best-of-three quarterfinals
4	Talk 'N Text Tropang Texters	8	6	.571	3	Best-of-three quarterfinals
5	San Mig Super Coffee Mixers	7	7	.500	4	Best-of-three quarterfinals
6	Barako Bull Energy	5	9	.357 (Note: Head-to-head quotient: Barako Bull 1.06, GlobalPort 1.01, Alaska 0.99, Meralco 0.95; eighth seed playoff: Alaska 94–91 Meralco)	6	Best-of-three quarterfinals
7	GlobalPort Batang Pier	5	9	.357	6	Twice-to-win in the quarterfinals
8	Alaska Aces	5	9	.357	6	Twice-to-win in the quarterfinals
9	Meralco Bolts	5	9	.357	6	
10	Air21 Express	3	11	.214	8	

Source: PBA.ph

=== Playoffs ===
==== Bracket ====
Quarterfinals
(#1 twice-to-beat)
1	Barangay Ginebra	97	108
8	Alaska	104	95
(best-of-3)
4	Talk 'N Text	1
5	San Mig Coffee	2
(#2 twice-to-beat)
2	Rain or Shine	106
7	GlobalPort	96
(best-of-3)
3	Petron Blaze	2
6	Barako Bull	0

Semifinals (best-of-7)
1	Barangay Ginebra	3
5	San Mig Coffee	4
2	Rain or Shine	4
3	Petron Blaze	1

Finals (best-of-7)
5	San Mig Coffee	4
2	Rain or Shine	2

== Commissioner's Cup ==
=== Eliminations ===
==== Standings ====
Pos	Team	W	L	PCT	GB	Qualification
1	Talk 'N Text Tropang Texters	9	0	1.000	—	Twice-to-beat in the quarterfinals
2	San Miguel Beermen	7	2	.778	2	Twice-to-beat in the quarterfinals
3	Alaska Aces	6	3	.667	3	Best-of-three quarterfinals
4	Rain or Shine Elasto Painters	5	4	.556 (Note: Head-to-head record: Rain or Shine 1–0 Meralco)	4	Best-of-three quarterfinals
5	Meralco Bolts	5	4	.556	4	Best-of-three quarterfinals
6	San Mig Super Coffee Mixers	4	5	.444	5	Best-of-three quarterfinals
7	Air21 Express	3	6	.333 (Note: Head-to-head record: Air21 1–0 Barangay Ginebra)	6	Twice-to-win in the quarterfinals
8	Barangay Ginebra San Miguel	3	6	.333	6	Twice-to-win in the quarterfinals
9	Barako Bull Energy	2	7	.222	7	
10	GlobalPort Batang Pier	1	8	.111	8	

Source: PBA.ph

=== Playoffs ===
==== Bracket ====
Quarterfinals
(#1 twice-to-beat)
1	Talk 'N Text	97
8	Barangay Ginebra	84
(best-of-3)
4	Rain or Shine	2
5	Meralco	1
(#2 twice-to-beat)
2	San Miguel	79	95
7	Air21	92	101**
(best-of-3)
3	Alaska	1
6	San Mig Coffee	2

Semifinals (best-of-5)
1	Talk 'N Text	3
4	Rain or Shine	0
7	Air21	2
6	San Mig Coffee	3

Finals (best-of-5)
1	Talk 'N Text	1
6	San Mig Coffee	3

**double overtime

== Governors' Cup ==
=== Eliminations ===
==== Standings ====
Pos	Team	W	L	PCT	GB	Qualification
1	Talk 'N Text Tropang Texters	7	2	.778	—	Twice-to-beat in the quarterfinals
2	Rain or Shine Elasto Painters	6	3	.667	1	Twice-to-beat in the quarterfinals
3	Alaska Aces	5	4	.556 (Note: Head-to-head quotient: Alaska 1.08, San Mig 1.02, San Miguel 0.99, Barangay Ginebra 0.97, Air21 0.94)	2	Twice-to-beat in the quarterfinals
4	San Mig Super Coffee Mixers	5	4	.556	2	Twice-to-beat in the quarterfinals
5	Petron Blaze Boosters	5	4	.556	2	Twice-to-win in the quarterfinals
6	Barangay Ginebra San Miguel	5	4	.556	2	Twice-to-win in the quarterfinals
7	Air21 Express	5	4	.556	2	Twice-to-win in the quarterfinals
8	Barako Bull Energy	3	6	.333 (Note: Head-to-head record: Barako Bull 95–94 Meralco)	4	Twice-to-win in the quarterfinals
9	Meralco Bolts	3	6	.333	4	
10	GlobalPort Batang Pier	1	8	.111	6	

Source: PBA.ph

==== Bracket ====
Quarterfinals
(#1 twice to beat)
1	Talk 'N Text	99
8	Barako Bull	84
(#4 twice to beat)
4	San Mig Coffee	97
5	San Miguel	90
(#2 twice to beat)
2	Rain or Shine	111
7	Air21	90
(#3 twice to beat)
3	Alaska	92
6	Barangay Ginebra	81

Semifinals (best-of-5)
1	Talk 'N Text	2
4	San Mig Coffee	3
2	Rain or Shine	3
3	Alaska	2

Finals (best-of-5)
4	San Mig Coffee	3
2	Rain or Shine	2

== Transactions ==
=== Trades ===
==== Pre-season ====
October 22, 2013	To Barangay Ginebra Jay-R Reyes	To Meralco Kerby Raymundo

October 31, 2013	To Barangay Ginebra Emman Monfort	To Barako Bull Robert Labagala

=== Recruited imports ===
Tournament	Name	Debuted	Last game	Record
Commissioner's Cup	Leon Rodgers	March 7 (vs. Barako Bull)	March 26 (vs. Air21)	2–4
Commissioner's Cup	Josh Powell	April 2 (vs. Meralco)	April 13 (vs. Alaska)	1–1
Commissioner's Cup	Gabe Freeman	April 20 (vs. Rain or Shine)	April 22 (vs. Talk 'N Text)	0–2
Governors' Cup	Zaccheus Mason	May 20 (vs. GlobalPort)	June 18 (vs. Alaska)	5–5
