= 2013–14 San Miguel Beermen season =

- Head coach: Gee Abanilla (Philippine Cup); Biboy Ravanes (Commissioner's and Governors' Cup)
- General Manager: Siot Tanquingcen (Philippine Cup); Gee Abanilla
- Owner(s): San Miguel Brewery, Inc. (a San Miguel Corporation subsidiary)

Philippine Cup results
- Record: 10–4 (71.4%)
- Place: 3rd
- Playoff finish: Semifinalist (def. by Rain or Shine, 1–4)

Commissioner's Cup results
- Record: 7–2 (77.8%)
- Place: 2nd
- Playoff finish: Quarterfinalist (def. by Air21 in two games)

Governors' Cup results
- Record: 5–4 (55.6%)
- Place: 5th
- Playoff finish: Quarterfinalist (def. by San Mig Super Coffee in one game)

San Miguel Beermen seasons

The 2013–14 San Miguel Beermen season was the 39th season of the franchise in the Philippine Basketball Association (PBA). The team was known as the Petron Blaze Boosters for the duration of the Philippine Cup.

== Key dates ==
- November 3: The 2013 PBA Draft took place in Midtown Atrium, Robinson Place Manila.
- January 13: San Miguel Corporation president Ramon S. Ang announced that the team will revert to its iconic name "San Miguel Beermen" starting the 2014 PBA Commissioner's Cup.

== Draft picks ==
Round	Pick	Player	Position	Nationality	PBA D-League team	College
3	5	Sam Marata	G	Philippines	Blackwater Sports	UP Diliman
4	4	Nate Matute	G	Philippines	Erase XFoliant Erasers	JRU

== Rosters ==
2013–14 San Miguel Beermen roster
Players
Coaches

Pos.	#	POB	Name	Height	Weight	DOB (YYYY–MM–DD)	From
F	1	(Philippines)	Rico Maierhofer	6 ft 6 in (1.98 m)	175 lb (79 kg)	1985-11-04	De La Salle
SF	3	(United States)	Chris Lutz	6 ft 3 in (1.91 m)	200 lb (91 kg)	1985-02-11	Marshall
PG	6	(United States)	Chris Ross (C)	6 ft 1 in (1.85 m)	180 lb (82 kg)	1985-03-08	Marshall
PG	7	(United States)	Solomon Mercado	6 ft 0 in (1.83 m)	185 lb (84 kg)	1984-05-06	Biola
G	12	(Philippines)	Paolo Hubalde	5 ft 11 in (1.80 m)	170 lb (77 kg)	1981-01-24	UE
SF	13	(United States)	Marcio Lassiter	6 ft 2 in (1.88 m)	185 lb (84 kg)	1987-05-16	Cal State Fullerton
C	15	(Philippines)	June Mar Fajardo	6 ft 11 in (2.11 m)	250 lb (113 kg)	1989-11-17	Cebu
F/C	18	(Philippines)	Doug Kramer	6 ft 5 in (1.96 m)	210 lb (95 kg)	1983-07-10	Ateneo
PG	26	(Philippines)	Chico Lanete	6 ft 0 in (1.83 m)	180 lb (82 kg)	1979-08-01	Lyceum
SF	29	(Philippines)	Arwind Santos	6 ft 4 in (1.93 m)	170 lb (77 kg)	1981-06-10	Far Eastern
F/C	41	(Philippines)	Justin Chua (R)	6 ft 5 in (1.96 m)	232 lb (105 kg)	1989-07-13	Ateneo
SG	71	(Philippines)	Ronald Tubid	6 ft 1 in (1.85 m)	185 lb (84 kg)	1981-10-15	UE

Head coach

- (Philippines) Biboy Ravanes (Cebu)

Assistant coach(es)

- (United States) John Todd Purves (consultant)
- (Philippines) Dayong Mendoza
- (Philippines) Riel Banaria
- (Philippines) Boyzie Zamar
- (Philippines) Peter Martin

Team manager

- (Philippines) Gee Abanilla (De La Salle)

Legend

- (C) Team captain
- (CI) Commissioner's Cup Import
- (GI) Governors' Cup Import
- (EI) EASL Import
- (DP) Unsigned draft pick
- (FA) Free agent
- (IN) Inactive
- (S) Suspended
- (R) Rookie
- Injured

Roster

== Philippine Cup ==
=== Eliminations ===
==== Standings ====
Pos	Team	W	L	PCT	GB	Qualification
1	Barangay Ginebra San Miguel	11	3	.786 (Note: Head-to-head record: Barangay Ginebra 1–0 Rain or Shine)	—	Twice-to-beat in the quarterfinals
2	Rain or Shine Elasto Painters	11	3	.786	—	Twice-to-beat in the quarterfinals
3	Petron Blaze Boosters	10	4	.714	1	Best-of-three quarterfinals
4	Talk 'N Text Tropang Texters	8	6	.571	3	Best-of-three quarterfinals
5	San Mig Super Coffee Mixers	7	7	.500	4	Best-of-three quarterfinals
6	Barako Bull Energy	5	9	.357 (Note: Head-to-head quotient: Barako Bull 1.06, GlobalPort 1.01, Alaska 0.99, Meralco 0.95; eighth seed playoff: Alaska 94–91 Meralco)	6	Best-of-three quarterfinals
7	GlobalPort Batang Pier	5	9	.357	6	Twice-to-win in the quarterfinals
8	Alaska Aces	5	9	.357	6	Twice-to-win in the quarterfinals
9	Meralco Bolts	5	9	.357	6	
10	Air21 Express	3	11	.214	8	

Source: PBA.ph

=== Playoffs ===
==== Bracket ====
Quarterfinals
(#1 twice-to-beat)
1	Barangay Ginebra	97	108
8	Alaska	104	95
(best-of-3)
4	Talk 'N Text	1
5	San Mig Coffee	2
(#2 twice-to-beat)
2	Rain or Shine	106
7	GlobalPort	96
(best-of-3)
3	Petron Blaze	2
6	Barako Bull	0

Semifinals (best-of-7)
1	Barangay Ginebra	3
5	San Mig Coffee	4
2	Rain or Shine	4
3	Petron Blaze	1

Finals (best-of-7)
5	San Mig Coffee	4
2	Rain or Shine	2

== Commissioner's Cup ==
=== Eliminations ===
==== Standings ====
Pos	Team	W	L	PCT	GB	Qualification
1	Talk 'N Text Tropang Texters	9	0	1.000	—	Twice-to-beat in the quarterfinals
2	San Miguel Beermen	7	2	.778	2	Twice-to-beat in the quarterfinals
3	Alaska Aces	6	3	.667	3	Best-of-three quarterfinals
4	Rain or Shine Elasto Painters	5	4	.556 (Note: Head-to-head record: Rain or Shine 1–0 Meralco)	4	Best-of-three quarterfinals
5	Meralco Bolts	5	4	.556	4	Best-of-three quarterfinals
6	San Mig Super Coffee Mixers	4	5	.444	5	Best-of-three quarterfinals
7	Air21 Express	3	6	.333 (Note: Head-to-head record: Air21 1–0 Barangay Ginebra)	6	Twice-to-win in the quarterfinals
8	Barangay Ginebra San Miguel	3	6	.333	6	Twice-to-win in the quarterfinals
9	Barako Bull Energy	2	7	.222	7	
10	GlobalPort Batang Pier	1	8	.111	8	

Source: PBA.ph

=== Playoffs ===
==== Bracket ====
Quarterfinals
(#1 twice-to-beat)
1	Talk 'N Text	97
8	Barangay Ginebra	84
(best-of-3)
4	Rain or Shine	2
5	Meralco	1
(#2 twice-to-beat)
2	San Miguel	79	95
7	Air21	92	101**
(best-of-3)
3	Alaska	1
6	San Mig Coffee	2

Semifinals (best-of-5)
1	Talk 'N Text	3
4	Rain or Shine	0
7	Air21	2
6	San Mig Coffee	3

Finals (best-of-5)
1	Talk 'N Text	1
6	San Mig Coffee	3

**double overtime

== Governors' Cup ==
=== Eliminations ===
==== Standings ====
Pos	Team	W	L	PCT	GB	Qualification
1	Talk 'N Text Tropang Texters	7	2	.778	—	Twice-to-beat in the quarterfinals
2	Rain or Shine Elasto Painters	6	3	.667	1	Twice-to-beat in the quarterfinals
3	Alaska Aces	5	4	.556 (Note: Head-to-head quotient: Alaska 1.08, San Mig 1.02, San Miguel 0.99, Barangay Ginebra 0.97, Air21 0.94)	2	Twice-to-beat in the quarterfinals
4	San Mig Super Coffee Mixers	5	4	.556	2	Twice-to-beat in the quarterfinals
5	Petron Blaze Boosters	5	4	.556	2	Twice-to-win in the quarterfinals
6	Barangay Ginebra San Miguel	5	4	.556	2	Twice-to-win in the quarterfinals
7	Air21 Express	5	4	.556	2	Twice-to-win in the quarterfinals
8	Barako Bull Energy	3	6	.333 (Note: Head-to-head record: Barako Bull 95–94 Meralco)	4	Twice-to-win in the quarterfinals
9	Meralco Bolts	3	6	.333	4	
10	GlobalPort Batang Pier	1	8	.111	6	

Source: PBA.ph

==== Bracket ====
Quarterfinals
(#1 twice to beat)
1	Talk 'N Text	99
8	Barako Bull	84
(#4 twice to beat)
4	San Mig Coffee	97
5	San Miguel	90
(#2 twice to beat)
2	Rain or Shine	111
7	Air21	90
(#3 twice to beat)
3	Alaska	92
6	Barangay Ginebra	81

Semifinals (best-of-5)
1	Talk 'N Text	2
4	San Mig Coffee	3
2	Rain or Shine	3
3	Alaska	2

Finals (best-of-5)
4	San Mig Coffee	3
2	Rain or Shine	2

== Transactions ==
=== Trades ===
==== Pre-season ====
October 30, 2013	To Petron Blaze Chris Ross	To GlobalPort Dennis Miranda

November 4, 2013	To Petron Blaze Yousef Taha	To GlobalPort future draft pick	To Barako Bull Magi Sison Mark Isip

=== Recruited imports ===
Tournament	Name	Debuted	Last game	Record
Commissioner's Cup	Josh Boone	March 7 (vs. Meralco)	March 9 (vs. Barangay Ginebra)	2–0
Commissioner's Cup	Kevin Jones	March 14 (vs. Talk 'N Text)	April 25 (vs. Air21)	5–4
Governors' Cup	Reggie Williams	May 18 (vs. Alaska)	June 17 (vs. San Mig Super Coffee)	5–5
