= 2013–14 Air21 Express season =

- Head coach: Franz Pumaren
- Owners: Airfrieght 2100, Inc. (a Lina Group of Companies subsidiary)

Philippine Cup results
- Record: 3–11 (21.4%)
- Place: 10th
- Playoff finish: Not qualified

Commissioner's Cup results
- Record: 3–6 (33.3%)
- Place: 7th
- Playoff finish: Semifinals (Def. by San Mig Super Coffee, 3-2.)

Governors' Cup results
- Record: 5–4 (55.6%)
- Place: 7th
- Playoff finish: Quarterfinalist (Def. by Rain or Shine in one game)

Air21 Express seasons

The 2013–14 Air21 Express season was the 3rd and final season of the franchise in the Philippine Basketball Association (PBA).

== Key dates ==
- November 3: The 2013 PBA Draft took place in Midtown Atrium, Robinson Place Manila.
- March 12: The Express got star point-guard Jonas Villanueva in a trade.
- April 4: Express's Jonas Villanueva's four champion streak as the All-Star weekend Obstacle Course Champion was ended and defeated by Mark Barroca.
- April 25: The Express got their first franchise Semifinal appearance as they defeated the San Miguel Beermen twice on a twice to beat matchup on the quarterfinals.
- June 26: The Express sold their franchise to the Metro Pacific Investments Corporation, Inc.

== Draft picks ==
Round	Pick	Player	Position	Country of birth*	PBA D-League team	College
2	6	Eric Camson	SF	Philippines	NLEX Road Warriors	Adamson
3	1	Joshua Webb	SG/SF	Philippines	Cagayan Rising Suns	De La Salle
4	1	Angelo Ingco	PG	Philippines	None	San Beda
5	1	Randolph Chua	PG	Philippines	None	Saint Benilde

== Roster ==
2013–14 Air21 Express roster
Players
Coaches

Pos.	#	POB	Name	Height	Weight	DOB (YYYY–MM–DD)	From
SG	3	(Philippines)	Mark Cardona	6 ft 2 in (1.88 m)	180 lb (82 kg)	1981-11-03	De La Salle
PG	6	(Philippines)	Eloy Poligrates (R)	6 ft 0 in (1.83 m)	180 lb (82 kg)	1986-29-04	Southwestern-U
G	7	(Philippines)	Atkins, Simon	6 ft 0 in (1.83 m)	180 lb (82 kg)	1988-07-19	De La Salle
SG	8	(Philippines)	Joseph Yeo	6 ft 2 in (1.88 m)	190 lb (86 kg)	1983-09-07	De La Salle
SF	10	(Canada)	Sean Anthony (injured)	6 ft 4 in (1.93 m)	200 lb (91 kg)	1986-01-26	McGill
PG	11	(Philippines)	Jonas Villanueva	5 ft 11 in (1.80 m)	175 lb (79 kg)	1983-03-31	Far Eastern
F	13	(Philippines)	Eric Camson (R)	6 ft 3 in (1.91 m)	228 lb (103 kg)	1990-06-12	Adamson
F/C	14	(Philippines)	Enrico Villanueva	6 ft 5 in (1.96 m)	230 lb (104 kg)	1980-06-23	Ateneo
G/F	15	(Philippines)	Menor, Ogie	6 ft 5 in (1.96 m)	190 lb (86 kg)	1986-12-04	San Beda
F	16	(Philippines)	Mark Borboran	6 ft 4 in (1.93 m)	170 lb (77 kg)	1981-11-01	UE
F/C	17	(Philippines)	Aldrech Ramos	6 ft 7 in (2.01 m)	215 lb (98 kg)	1988-04-03	Far Eastern
G/F	21	(Philippines)	Jaime, Chito	6 ft 4 in (1.93 m)	200 lb (91 kg)	1983-10-21	AMA
PF	63	(Switzerland)	Michael Burtscher	6 ft 6 in (1.98 m)	210 lb (95 kg)	1985-03-08	Clearwater Christian
C	88	(Tonga)	Asi Taulava	6 ft 9 in (2.06 m)	245 lb (111 kg)	1973-03-02	BYU–Hawaii

Head coach

- (Philippines) Franz Pumaren (De La Salle)

Assistant coach(es)

- (Philippines) Jack Santiago (De La Salle)
- (Philippines) Tonichi Yturri (De La Salle)
- (Philippines) Pocholo Villanueva (De La Salle)
- (Philippines) Daniel Rose
- (Philippines) Joshua Villapando
- (Philippines) Johnny Tam

Legend

- (C) Team captain
- (CI) Commissioner's Cup Import
- (GI) Governors' Cup Import
- (EI) EASL Import
- (DP) Unsigned draft pick
- (FA) Free agent
- (IN) Inactive
- (S) Suspended
- (R) Rookie
- Injured

Roster

== Philippine Cup ==
=== Eliminations ===
==== Standings ====
Pos	Team	W	L	PCT	GB	Qualification
1	Barangay Ginebra San Miguel	11	3	.786 (Note: Head-to-head record: Barangay Ginebra 1–0 Rain or Shine)	—	Twice-to-beat in the quarterfinals
2	Rain or Shine Elasto Painters	11	3	.786	—	Twice-to-beat in the quarterfinals
3	Petron Blaze Boosters	10	4	.714	1	Best-of-three quarterfinals
4	Talk 'N Text Tropang Texters	8	6	.571	3	Best-of-three quarterfinals
5	San Mig Super Coffee Mixers	7	7	.500	4	Best-of-three quarterfinals
6	Barako Bull Energy	5	9	.357 (Note: Head-to-head quotient: Barako Bull 1.06, GlobalPort 1.01, Alaska 0.99, Meralco 0.95; eighth seed playoff: Alaska 94–91 Meralco)	6	Best-of-three quarterfinals
7	GlobalPort Batang Pier	5	9	.357	6	Twice-to-win in the quarterfinals
8	Alaska Aces	5	9	.357	6	Twice-to-win in the quarterfinals
9	Meralco Bolts	5	9	.357	6	
10	Air21 Express	3	11	.214	8	

Source: PBA.ph

== Commissioner's Cup ==
=== Eliminations ===
==== Standings ====
Pos	Team	W	L	PCT	GB	Qualification
1	Talk 'N Text Tropang Texters	9	0	1.000	—	Twice-to-beat in the quarterfinals
2	San Miguel Beermen	7	2	.778	2	Twice-to-beat in the quarterfinals
3	Alaska Aces	6	3	.667	3	Best-of-three quarterfinals
4	Rain or Shine Elasto Painters	5	4	.556 (Note: Head-to-head record: Rain or Shine 1–0 Meralco)	4	Best-of-three quarterfinals
5	Meralco Bolts	5	4	.556	4	Best-of-three quarterfinals
6	San Mig Super Coffee Mixers	4	5	.444	5	Best-of-three quarterfinals
7	Air21 Express	3	6	.333 (Note: Head-to-head record: Air21 1–0 Barangay Ginebra)	6	Twice-to-win in the quarterfinals
8	Barangay Ginebra San Miguel	3	6	.333	6	Twice-to-win in the quarterfinals
9	Barako Bull Energy	2	7	.222	7	
10	GlobalPort Batang Pier	1	8	.111	8	

Source: PBA.ph

=== Playoffs ===
==== Bracket ====
Quarterfinals
(#1 twice-to-beat)
1	Talk 'N Text	97
8	Barangay Ginebra	84
(Best-of-3)
4	Rain or Shine	2
5	Meralco	1
(#2 twice-to-beat)
2	San Miguel	79	95
7	Air21	92	101**
(Best-of-3)
3	Alaska	1
6	San Mig Coffee	2

Semifinals (Best-of-5)
1	Talk 'N Text	3
4	Rain or Shine	0
7	Air21	2
6	San Mig Coffee	3

Finals (Best-of-5)
1	Talk 'N Text	1
6	San Mig Coffee	3

**double overtime

== Governors' Cup ==
=== Eliminations ===
==== Standings ====
Pos	Team	W	L	PCT	GB	Qualification
1	Talk 'N Text Tropang Texters	7	2	.778	—	Twice-to-beat in the quarterfinals
2	Rain or Shine Elasto Painters	6	3	.667	1	Twice-to-beat in the quarterfinals
3	Alaska Aces	5	4	.556 (Note: Head-to-head quotient: Alaska 1.08, San Mig 1.02, San Miguel 0.99, Barangay Ginebra 0.97, Air21 0.94)	2	Twice-to-beat in the quarterfinals
4	San Mig Super Coffee Mixers	5	4	.556	2	Twice-to-beat in the quarterfinals
5	Petron Blaze Boosters	5	4	.556	2	Twice-to-win in the quarterfinals
6	Barangay Ginebra San Miguel	5	4	.556	2	Twice-to-win in the quarterfinals
7	Air21 Express	5	4	.556	2	Twice-to-win in the quarterfinals
8	Barako Bull Energy	3	6	.333 (Note: Head-to-head record: Barako Bull 95–94 Meralco)	4	Twice-to-win in the quarterfinals
9	Meralco Bolts	3	6	.333	4	
10	GlobalPort Batang Pier	1	8	.111	6	

Source: PBA.ph

==== Bracket ====
Quarterfinals (Top 4 twice-to-beat)
1	Talk 'N Text	99
8	Barako Bull	84
4	San Mig Coffee	97
5	San Miguel	90
2	Rain or Shine	111
7	Air21	90
3	Alaska	92
6	Barangay Ginebra	81

Semifinals (Best-of-5)
1	Talk 'N Text	2
4	San Mig Coffee	3
2	Rain or Shine	3
3	Alaska	2

Finals (Best-of-5)
4	San Mig Coffee	3
2	Rain or Shine	2

== Transactions ==
=== Recruited imports ===
Tournament	Name	Debuted	Last game	Record
Commissioner's Cup	Hervé Lamizana	March 5 (vs. GlobalPort)	March 17 (vs. Alaska)	2-2
Commissioner's Cup	Wesley Witherspoon	March 23 (vs. Meralco)	May 7 (vs. San Mig Super Coffee)	5–7
Governors' Cup	Dominique Sutton	May 20 (vs. Rain or Shine)	June 18 (vs. Rain or Shine)	5–5
