= 2013–14 Alaska Aces season =

- Head coach: Luigi Trillo (Philippine and Commissioner's Cup); Alex Compton (Governors' Cup)
- General manager: Dickie Bachmann
- Owner: Alaska Milk Corporation

Philippine Cup results
- Record: 5–9 (35.7%)
- Place: 8th
- Playoff finish: Quarterfinalist (def. by Barangay Ginebra in two games on a twice to beat series.)

Commissioner's Cup results
- Record: 6–3 (66.7%)
- Place: 3rd
- Playoff finish: Quarterfinals (def. by San Mig Super Coffee 2-1.)

Governors' Cup results
- Record: 5–4 (55.6%)
- Place: 3rd
- Playoff finish: Semifinalist (def. by Rain or Shine, 3-2)

Alaska Aces seasons

The 2013–14 Alaska Aces season was the 28th season of the franchise in the Philippine Basketball Association (PBA).

== Key dates ==
=== 2013 ===
- November 3: The 2013 PBA Draft took place in Midtown Atrium, Robinson Place Manila.
  - Talk 'N Text Tropang Texters acquired the rights to Alaska’s 2013 second round draft pick (turned out to be John Paul Erram).
  - Alaska Aces acquired the rights to Talk ‘N Text’s 2015 second round draft pick.
- November 27: PBA fined Alaska Aces players (₱ 1,000 each), Gabby Espinas and Calvin Abueva, for their respective technical fouls. (1st technical foul of both players in the 2013–14 PBA Philippine Cup)
- December 12: PBA fined Alaska Aces head coach Luigi Trillo and Cyrus Baguio (₱ 1,000 each), for their respective technical fouls. (1st technical foul of the two in the 2013–14 PBA Philippine Cup)

=== 2014 ===
- May 25: Luigi Trillo resigned as head coach due to family reasons and was replaced by Alex Compton.
- June 4: Alaska Aces lost by 51 points (72–123) against Rain or Shine Elasto Painters. Making the game the fourth-most lopsided beating in PBA history, and the biggest margin of victory in 28 years, or since Shell annihilated Tanduay, 154-100, on November 16, 1986. Likewise, it’s the franchise’s biggest win, and the worst defeat for Alaska in their existence in the PBA.

== Draft picks ==
Round	Pick	Player	Position	Nationality	PBA D-League team	College
1	8	Ryan Buenafe	SG	Philippines	Big Chill Super Chargers	Ateneo
2	5	JP Erram	C	Philippines	None	Ateneo
2	8	Chris Exciminiano	SG	Philippines	Cagayan Rising Suns	Far Eastern
3	8	Raymond Ilagan				St. Francis

== Roster ==
2013–14 Alaska Aces roster
Players
Coaches

Pos.	#	POB	Name	Height	Weight	DOB (YYYY–MM–DD)	From
G/F	3	(Philippines)	Cyrus Baguio	6 ft 2 in (1.88 m)	180 lb (82 kg)	1980-08-19	UST
G	4	(Philippines)	Raffy Reyes	5 ft 10 in (1.78 m)	165 lb (75 kg)	1987-12-1	UE
G	5	(Philippines)	Chris Exciminiano (R)	5 ft 10 in (1.78 m)	185 lb (84 kg)	1988-11-17	Far Eastern
C	7	(Papua New Guinea)	Sonny Thoss	6 ft 7 in (2.01 m)	205 lb (93 kg)	1981-12-07	James Cook
G/F	8	(Philippines)	Calvin Abueva	6 ft 1 in (1.85 m)	190 lb (86 kg)	1988-02-04	San Sebastian
F	11	(Philippines)	Eddie Laure	6 ft 3 in (1.91 m)	195 lb (88 kg)	1977-07-06	Adamson
C	12	(Philippines)	Samigue Eman	6 ft 10 in (2.08 m)	320 lb (145 kg)	1982-03-12	Mindanao
G/F	13	(Philippines)	Ryan Buenafe (R)	6 ft 2 in (1.88 m)	220 lb (100 kg)	1990-02-01	Ateneo
F/C	24	(Philippines)	Manuel, Vic	6 ft 5 in (1.96 m)	200 lb (91 kg)	1987-06-18	PSBA
G	25	(Philippines)	Dondon Hontiveros	6 ft 2 in (1.88 m)	170 lb (77 kg)	1977-06-01	Cebu
F	27	(Philippines)	Gabby Espinas	6 ft 5 in (1.96 m)	194 lb (88 kg)	1982-01-03	Philippine Christian
G	31	(Philippines)	RJ Jazul	5 ft 10 in (1.78 m)	170 lb (77 kg)	1986-04-11	Letran
G/F	35	(United States)	Tony dela Cruz (C)	6 ft 4 in (1.93 m)	178 lb (81 kg)	1978-08-24	UC Irvine
G	42	(Philippines)	JV Casio	5 ft 9 in (1.75 m)	170 lb (77 kg)	1986-09-01	De La Salle

Head coach

- (United States) Alex Compton (Cornell)

Assistant coach(es)

- (Philippines) Louie Alas (Adamson)
- (Philippines) Topex Robinson (San Sebastian)
- (Philippines) Monch Gavieres
- (Philippines) Franco Atienza

Team manager

- (Philippines) Dickie Bachmann^{[a]} (De La Salle)

Legend

- (C) Team captain
- (CI) Commissioner's Cup Import
- (GI) Governors' Cup Import
- (EI) EASL Import
- (DP) Unsigned draft pick
- (FA) Free agent
- (IN) Inactive
- (S) Suspended
- (R) Rookie
- Injured

Roster

- ^{a} also serves as Alaska's board governor.

== Philippine Cup ==
=== Eliminations ===
==== Standings ====
Pos	Team	W	L	PCT	GB	Qualification
1	Barangay Ginebra San Miguel	11	3	.786 (Note: Head-to-head record: Barangay Ginebra 1–0 Rain or Shine)	—	Twice-to-beat in the quarterfinals
2	Rain or Shine Elasto Painters	11	3	.786	—	Twice-to-beat in the quarterfinals
3	Petron Blaze Boosters	10	4	.714	1	Best-of-three quarterfinals
4	Talk 'N Text Tropang Texters	8	6	.571	3	Best-of-three quarterfinals
5	San Mig Super Coffee Mixers	7	7	.500	4	Best-of-three quarterfinals
6	Barako Bull Energy	5	9	.357 (Note: Head-to-head quotient: Barako Bull 1.06, GlobalPort 1.01, Alaska 0.99, Meralco 0.95; eighth seed playoff: Alaska 94–91 Meralco)	6	Best-of-three quarterfinals
7	GlobalPort Batang Pier	5	9	.357	6	Twice-to-win in the quarterfinals
8	Alaska Aces	5	9	.357	6	Twice-to-win in the quarterfinals
9	Meralco Bolts	5	9	.357	6	
10	Air21 Express	3	11	.214	8	

Source: PBA.ph

=== Playoffs ===
==== Bracket ====
Quarterfinals
(#1 twice-to-beat)
1	Barangay Ginebra	97	108
8	Alaska	104	95
(Best-of-3)
4	Talk 'N Text	1
5	San Mig Coffee	2
(#2 twice-to-beat)
2	Rain or Shine	106
7	GlobalPort	96
(Best-of-3)
3	Petron Blaze	2
6	Barako Bull	0

Semifinals (Best-of-7)
1	Barangay Ginebra	3
5	San Mig Coffee	4
2	Rain or Shine	4
3	Petron Blaze	1

Finals (Best-of-7)
5	San Mig Coffee	4
2	Rain or Shine	2

== Commissioner's Cup ==
=== Eliminations ===
==== Standings ====
Pos	Team	W	L	PCT	GB	Qualification
1	Talk 'N Text Tropang Texters	9	0	1.000	—	Twice-to-beat in the quarterfinals
2	San Miguel Beermen	7	2	.778	2	Twice-to-beat in the quarterfinals
3	Alaska Aces	6	3	.667	3	Best-of-three quarterfinals
4	Rain or Shine Elasto Painters	5	4	.556 (Note: Head-to-head record: Rain or Shine 1–0 Meralco)	4	Best-of-three quarterfinals
5	Meralco Bolts	5	4	.556	4	Best-of-three quarterfinals
6	San Mig Super Coffee Mixers	4	5	.444	5	Best-of-three quarterfinals
7	Air21 Express	3	6	.333 (Note: Head-to-head record: Air21 1–0 Barangay Ginebra)	6	Twice-to-win in the quarterfinals
8	Barangay Ginebra San Miguel	3	6	.333	6	Twice-to-win in the quarterfinals
9	Barako Bull Energy	2	7	.222	7	
10	GlobalPort Batang Pier	1	8	.111	8	

Source: PBA.ph

=== Playoffs ===
==== Bracket ====
Quarterfinals
(#1 twice-to-beat)
1	Talk 'N Text	97
8	Barangay Ginebra	84
(Best-of-3)
4	Rain or Shine	2
5	Meralco	1
(#2 twice-to-beat)
2	San Miguel	79	95
7	Air21	92	101**
(Best-of-3)
3	Alaska	1
6	San Mig Coffee	2

Semifinals (Best-of-5)
1	Talk 'N Text	3
4	Rain or Shine	0
7	Air21	2
6	San Mig Coffee	3

Finals (Best-of-5)
1	Talk 'N Text	1
6	San Mig Coffee	3

**double overtime

== Governors' Cup ==
=== Eliminations ===
==== Standings ====
Pos	Team	W	L	PCT	GB	Qualification
1	Talk 'N Text Tropang Texters	7	2	.778	—	Twice-to-beat in the quarterfinals
2	Rain or Shine Elasto Painters	6	3	.667	1	Twice-to-beat in the quarterfinals
3	Alaska Aces	5	4	.556 (Note: Head-to-head quotient: Alaska 1.08, San Mig 1.02, San Miguel 0.99, Barangay Ginebra 0.97, Air21 0.94)	2	Twice-to-beat in the quarterfinals
4	San Mig Super Coffee Mixers	5	4	.556	2	Twice-to-beat in the quarterfinals
5	Petron Blaze Boosters	5	4	.556	2	Twice-to-win in the quarterfinals
6	Barangay Ginebra San Miguel	5	4	.556	2	Twice-to-win in the quarterfinals
7	Air21 Express	5	4	.556	2	Twice-to-win in the quarterfinals
8	Barako Bull Energy	3	6	.333 (Note: Head-to-head record: Barako Bull 95–94 Meralco)	4	Twice-to-win in the quarterfinals
9	Meralco Bolts	3	6	.333	4	
10	GlobalPort Batang Pier	1	8	.111	6	

Source: PBA.ph

==== Bracket ====
Quarterfinals (Top 4 twice-to-beat)
1	Talk 'N Text	99
8	Barako Bull	84
4	San Mig Coffee	97
5	San Miguel	90
2	Rain or Shine	111
7	Air21	90
3	Alaska	92
6	Barangay Ginebra	81

Semifinals (Best-of-5)
1	Talk 'N Text	2
4	San Mig Coffee	3
2	Rain or Shine	3
3	Alaska	2

Finals (Best-of-5)
4	San Mig Coffee	3
2	Rain or Shine	2

== Transactions ==
=== Recruited imports ===
Tournament	Name	Debuted	Last game	Record
Commissioner's Cup	Robert Dozier	March 5 (vs. Talk 'N Text)	April 26 (vs. San Mig Super Coffee)	7–5
Governors' Cup	Henry Walker	May 18 (vs. San Miguel)	June 28 (vs. Rain or Shine)	8–7
