= 2013–14 Talk 'N Text Tropang Texters season =

- Head coach: Norman Black
- General manager: Paolo Trillo
- Owners: Smart Communications (an MVP Group subsidiary)

Philippine Cup results
- Record: 8–6 (57.1%)
- Place: 4th
- Playoff finish: Quarterfinals (Def. by San Mig Super Coffee, 1-2.)

Commissioner's Cup results
- Record: 9–0 (100.0%)
- Place: 1st
- Playoff finish: Finals (def. by San Mig Super Coffee, 1-3)

Governors' Cup results
- Record: 7–2 (77.8%)
- Place: 1st
- Playoff finish: Semifinals (def. by San Mig Super Coffee, 2-3

Talk 'N Text Tropang Texters seasons

The 2013–14 Talk 'N Text Tropang Texters season was the 24th season of the franchise in the Philippine Basketball Association (PBA).

== Key dates ==
- November 3: The 2013 PBA Draft took place in Midtown Atrium, Robinson Place Manila.
- February 26: Ali Peek announced his retirement through Twitter.

== Draft picks ==
Round	Pick	Player	Position	Nationality	PBA D-League team	College
2	5	John Paul Erram	C	Philippines	None	Ateneo
2	7	Robby Celiz	SF	Philippines	Black Water Sports	National
3	7	Eliud Poligrates	PG	Philippines		SWU
4	6	Chris Sumalinog		Philippines		Ateneo
5	5	Byron Villarias		Philippines		JRU

== Roster ==
2013–14 Talk 'N Text Tropang Texters roster
Players
Coaches

Pos.	#	POB	Name	Height	Weight	DOB (YYYY–MM–DD)	From
PG	3	(United States)	Jimmy Alapag (C)	5 ft 8 in (1.73 m)	160 lb (73 kg)	1977-12-30	Cal State San Bernardino
PF	4	(United States)	Harvey Carey	6 ft 2 in (1.88 m)	210 lb (95 kg)	1979-03-18	Sonoma State
PG	5	(Philippines)	Jai Reyes	5 ft 9 in (1.75 m)	150 lb (68 kg)	1987-02-25	Ateneo
F	7	(Philippines)	Nonoy Baclao	6 ft 6 in (1.98 m)	210 lb (95 kg)	1987-06-15	Ateneo
F	8	(Philippines)	Robby Celiz (R)	6 ft 2 in (1.88 m)	217 lb (98 kg)	1988-09-07	National-U
F	9	(Philippines)	Niño Canaleta	6 ft 5 in (1.96 m)	210 lb (95 kg)	1982-02-12	UE
C/G	10	(United States)	Ryan Reyes	6 ft 1 in (1.85 m)	190 lb (86 kg)	1983-08-10	Cal State Fullerton
PG	11	(Philippines)	Eric Salamat (IN)	5 ft 10 in (1.78 m)	190 lb (86 kg)	1988-04-26	Ateneo
G/F	12	(Philippines)	Larry Fonacier	6 ft 2 in (1.88 m)	170 lb (77 kg)	1982-05-13	Ateneo
C/G	17	(Philippines)	Jayson Castro	5 ft 10 in (1.78 m)	167 lb (76 kg)	1986-06-30	Philippine Christian
F	21	(United States)	Kelly Williams	6 ft 7 in (2.01 m)	215 lb (98 kg)	1982-02-07	Oakland
F/C	24	(United States)	Robert Reyes	6 ft 6 in (1.98 m)	215 lb (98 kg)	1983-03-16	Flagler
F	33	(Philippines)	Ranidel De Ocampo	6 ft 5 in (1.96 m)	200 lb (91 kg)	1981-12-08	Saint Francis of Assisi
F	42	(United States)	Danny Seigle	6 ft 6 in (1.98 m)	215 lb (98 kg)	1976-06-14	Wagner
G/F	51	(Philippines)	Aaron Aban	6 ft 3 in (1.91 m)	200 lb (91 kg)	1982-04-08	Letran

Head coach

- (United States) Norman Black (Saint Joseph's)

Assistant coach(es)

- (Philippines) Sandy Arespacochaga (Ateneo)
- (Philippines) Gene Afable (Ateneo)
- (Philippines) Jong Uichico (De La Salle)
- (Philippines) Jamike Jarin
- (Philippines) Josh Reyes

Legend

- (C) Team captain
- (CI) Commissioner's Cup Import
- (GI) Governors' Cup Import
- (EI) EASL Import
- (DP) Unsigned draft pick
- (FA) Free agent
- (IN) Inactive
- (S) Suspended
- (R) Rookie
- Injured

== Philippine Cup ==
=== Eliminations ===
==== Standings ====
Pos	Team	W	L	PCT	GB	Qualification
1	Barangay Ginebra San Miguel	11	3	.786 (Note: Head-to-head record: Barangay Ginebra 1–0 Rain or Shine)	—	Twice-to-beat in the quarterfinals
2	Rain or Shine Elasto Painters	11	3	.786	—	Twice-to-beat in the quarterfinals
3	Petron Blaze Boosters	10	4	.714	1	Best-of-three quarterfinals
4	Talk 'N Text Tropang Texters	8	6	.571	3	Best-of-three quarterfinals
5	San Mig Super Coffee Mixers	7	7	.500	4	Best-of-three quarterfinals
6	Barako Bull Energy	5	9	.357 (Note: Head-to-head quotient: Barako Bull 1.06, GlobalPort 1.01, Alaska 0.99, Meralco 0.95; eighth seed playoff: Alaska 94–91 Meralco)	6	Best-of-three quarterfinals
7	GlobalPort Batang Pier	5	9	.357	6	Twice-to-win in the quarterfinals
8	Alaska Aces	5	9	.357	6	Twice-to-win in the quarterfinals
9	Meralco Bolts	5	9	.357	6	
10	Air21 Express	3	11	.214	8	

Source: PBA.ph

=== Playoffs ===
==== Bracket ====
Quarterfinals
(#1 twice-to-beat)
1	Barangay Ginebra	97	108
8	Alaska	104	95
(Best-of-3)
4	Talk 'N Text	1
5	San Mig Coffee	2
(#2 twice-to-beat)
2	Rain or Shine	106
7	GlobalPort	96
(Best-of-3)
3	Petron Blaze	2
6	Barako Bull	0

Semifinals (Best-of-7)
1	Barangay Ginebra	3
5	San Mig Coffee	4
2	Rain or Shine	4
3	Petron Blaze	1

Finals (Best-of-7)
5	San Mig Coffee	4
2	Rain or Shine	2

== Commissioner's Cup ==
=== Eliminations ===
==== Standings ====
Pos	Team	W	L	PCT	GB	Qualification
1	Talk 'N Text Tropang Texters	9	0	1.000	—	Twice-to-beat in the quarterfinals
2	San Miguel Beermen	7	2	.778	2	Twice-to-beat in the quarterfinals
3	Alaska Aces	6	3	.667	3	Best-of-three quarterfinals
4	Rain or Shine Elasto Painters	5	4	.556 (Note: Head-to-head record: Rain or Shine 1–0 Meralco)	4	Best-of-three quarterfinals
5	Meralco Bolts	5	4	.556	4	Best-of-three quarterfinals
6	San Mig Super Coffee Mixers	4	5	.444	5	Best-of-three quarterfinals
7	Air21 Express	3	6	.333 (Note: Head-to-head record: Air21 1–0 Barangay Ginebra)	6	Twice-to-win in the quarterfinals
8	Barangay Ginebra San Miguel	3	6	.333	6	Twice-to-win in the quarterfinals
9	Barako Bull Energy	2	7	.222	7	
10	GlobalPort Batang Pier	1	8	.111	8	

Source: PBA.ph

=== Playoffs ===
==== Bracket ====
Quarterfinals
(#1 twice-to-beat)
1	Talk 'N Text	97
8	Barangay Ginebra	84
(Best-of-3)
4	Rain or Shine	2
5	Meralco	1
(#2 twice-to-beat)
2	San Miguel	79	95
7	Air21	92	101**
(Best-of-3)
3	Alaska	1
6	San Mig Coffee	2

Semifinals (Best-of-5)
1	Talk 'N Text	3
4	Rain or Shine	0
7	Air21	2
6	San Mig Coffee	3

Finals (Best-of-5)
1	Talk 'N Text	1
6	San Mig Coffee	3

**double overtime

== Governors' Cup ==
=== Eliminations ===
==== Standings ====
Pos	Team	W	L	PCT	GB	Qualification
1	Talk 'N Text Tropang Texters	7	2	.778	—	Twice-to-beat in the quarterfinals
2	Rain or Shine Elasto Painters	6	3	.667	1	Twice-to-beat in the quarterfinals
3	Alaska Aces	5	4	.556 (Note: Head-to-head quotient: Alaska 1.08, San Mig 1.02, San Miguel 0.99, Barangay Ginebra 0.97, Air21 0.94)	2	Twice-to-beat in the quarterfinals
4	San Mig Super Coffee Mixers	5	4	.556	2	Twice-to-beat in the quarterfinals
5	Petron Blaze Boosters	5	4	.556	2	Twice-to-win in the quarterfinals
6	Barangay Ginebra San Miguel	5	4	.556	2	Twice-to-win in the quarterfinals
7	Air21 Express	5	4	.556	2	Twice-to-win in the quarterfinals
8	Barako Bull Energy	3	6	.333 (Note: Head-to-head record: Barako Bull 95–94 Meralco)	4	Twice-to-win in the quarterfinals
9	Meralco Bolts	3	6	.333	4	
10	GlobalPort Batang Pier	1	8	.111	6	

Source: PBA.ph

==== Bracket ====
Quarterfinals (Top 4 twice-to-beat)
1	Talk 'N Text	99
8	Barako Bull	84
4	San Mig Coffee	97
5	San Miguel	90
2	Rain or Shine	111
7	Air21	90
3	Alaska	92
6	Barangay Ginebra	81

Semifinals (Best-of-5)
1	Talk 'N Text	2
4	San Mig Coffee	3
2	Rain or Shine	3
3	Alaska	2

Finals (Best-of-5)
4	San Mig Coffee	3
2	Rain or Shine	2

== Transactions ==
=== Recruited imports ===
Tournament	Name	Debuted	Last game	Record
Commissioner's Cup	Richard Howell	March 5 (vs. Alaska)	May 15 (vs. San Mig Super Coffee)	13–3
Governors' Cup	Othyus Jeffers	May 21 (vs. Meralco)		1–0
Governors' Cup	Rodney Carney	May 28 (vs. Rain or Shine)	June 2 (vs. Air21)	3–0
Governors' Cup	Paul Harris	June 6 (vs. GlobalPort)	June 27 (vs. San Mig Super Coffee)	6–4
