= 2013–14 San Mig Super Coffee Mixers season =

2013-14 San Mig Super Coffee Mixers season
- Head coach: Tim Cone
- Owners: San Miguel-Pure Foods Co., Inc. (a San Miguel Corporation subsidiary)

Philippine Cup results
- Record: 17–13 (56.7%)
- Place: 1st
- Playoff finish: Champions (def. Rain or Shine, 4–2)

Commissioner's Cup results
- Record: 12–9 (57.1%)
- Place: 1st
- Playoff finish: Champions (def. Talk 'N Text, 3–1)

Governors' Cup results
- Record: 12–8 (60%)
- Place: 1st
- Playoff finish: Grand Slam Champions (def. Rain or Shine, 3–2)

San Mig Super Coffee Mixers seasons

The 2013–14 San Mig Super Coffee Mixers season was the 26th season of the franchise in the Philippine Basketball Association (PBA).

== Key dates ==
- November 3: The 2013 PBA Draft took place in Midtown Atrium, Robinson Place Manila.
- January 5: The Mixers defeated Barangay Ginebra San Miguel on a matchup that broke the record of the most people in the Mall of Asia Arena on a 79-83 victory, and an attendance of 20,600 people.
- February 12: The Mixers defeated Barangay Ginebra San Miguel in game seven of the best-of-seven series in the Semifinals of the Philippine Cup, a matchup that broke the record of the most crowd attendance in a game itself on a 110-87 victory, with an attendance of 25,000 people.
- February 26:The Mixers won their 11th Championship on the 2013-14 PBA Philippine Cup defeating Rain or Shine, 4 wins to 2.
- March 16: The Mixers again defeated Barangay Ginebra San Miguel on a 90-80 showdown, the matchup tallied the highest crowd attendance on the 2014 Commissioner's Cup.
- May 7: The Mixers won against the Air21 Express on a do-or-die matchup on the Game 5 of the 2014 Commissioner's Semifinals, and booking their third straight final appearance and fifth on the last seven conferences, it also tallies the sixth do or die game which the team survived since the 2013 Governors' Cup.
- May 15: Coach Tim Cone won his 17th PBA Championship in a 100-91 showdown against the Talk 'N Text Tropang Texters, on the first three quarters, the Texter dominated the game, but the Mixers rallied back even the lead was even blown up to 17, they eventually won the game, and the rest of the Mixers also won the franchise's 12th championship, it also tallies three straight championship of the team, and four championship in the last eight conferences, James Yap won his third Finals MVP award.
- June 1: The Mixers defeated Barangay Ginebra San Miguel, 100-88, it also tallied the most attendance in this season's Governors' Cup.
- June 3: Yancy de Ocampo and Val Acuña were traded to GlobalPort Batang Pier in exchange of Yousef Taha and Ronnie Matias.
- June 17: The Mixers won against the San Miguel Beermen, tallying the eight-straight semi-final appearance of the franchise since the 2012 PBA Commissioner's Cup.
- June 18: TV analyst and former PBA player Jason Webb is hired as assistant coach.
- June 27: The Mixers won against the Talk 'N Text Tropang Texters on their semi-final series, to tally their fourth straight final appearance and sixth in the last eight conferences, and surviving eight-straight on do-or-die games.
- July 9: The Mixers became the fourth team in PBA history to win the coveted Grand Slam after they won the deciding Game 5 of Governors Cup Finals, 92-89 against Rain or Shine Elasto Painters. James Yap was named the Finals MVP as he scored 29 points on 12 of 18 shooting from the field. This was the Mixers' 9th straight win in do or die games they played. Tim Cone became the only coach in PBA history to win 2 Grand Slams on two different teams. With this Grand Slam, the Mixers also had four-peat run, their 13th PBA title overall, tying them with the fabled Crispa Redmanizers for 3rd place in all-time list.

== Draft picks ==
Round	Pick	Player	Position	Nationality	PBA D-League team	College
1	2	Ian Sangalang	PF/C	Philippines	NLEX Road Warriors	San Sebastian
1	10	Justin Chua	C	Philippines	Black Water Sports	Ateneo
2	3	Justin Melton	PG	United States	None	Mount Olive
3	10	JR Cawaling		Philippines		FEU

== Roster ==
2013–14 San Mig Super Coffee Mixers roster
Players
Coaches

Pos.	#	POB	Name	Height	Weight	DOB (YYYY–MM–DD)	From
C	00	(Kuwait)	Yousef Taha	6 ft 8 in (2.03 m)	220 lb (100 kg)	1988-07-08	North Lake
PG	2	(United States)	Justin Melton	5 ft 9 in (1.75 m)	163 lb (74 kg)	1987-4-27	Mount Olive
F/C	4	(United States)	Rafi Reavis	6 ft 9 in (2.06 m)	205 lb (93 kg)	1977-7-27	Coppin State
F/C	5	(United States)	Isaac Holstein (injured)	6 ft 9 in (2.06 m)	206 lb (93 kg)	1987-9-7	West Virginia State
SF	6	(Philippines)	JR Cawaling	6 ft 5 in (1.96 m)	190 lb (86 kg)	1987-8-15	Far Eastern
SG	8	(Philippines)	Peter June Simon	6 ft 1 in (1.85 m)	180 lb (82 kg)	1980-6-1	Mindanao
PG	9	(Philippines)	Lester Alvarez	5 ft 9 in (1.75 m)	154 lb (70 kg)	1988-9-18	Adamson
F/C	10	(Philippines)	Ian Sangalang	6 ft 8 in (2.03 m)	212 lb (96 kg)	1991-12-20	San Sebastian
PG	11	(United States)	Alex Mallari	6 ft 4 in (1.93 m)	167 lb (76 kg)	1987-3-26	Lewis–Clark State
PG	14	(Philippines)	Mark Barroca	5 ft 11 in (1.80 m)	170 lb (77 kg)	1986-4-25	Far Eastern
PF	15	(Philippines)	Marc Pingris (C)	6 ft 6 in (1.98 m)	210 lb (95 kg)	1981-10-16	PSBA
SG	18	(Philippines)	James Yap	6 ft 3 in (1.91 m)	205 lb (93 kg)	1982-2-15	UE
SF	19	(Philippines)	Jerwin Gaco	6 ft 5 in (1.96 m)	180 lb (82 kg)	1981-1-17	De La Salle
SG	22	(Philippines)	Allein Maliksi	6 ft 4 in (1.93 m)	180 lb (82 kg)	1987-9-18	UST
SF	33	(Philippines)	Ronnie Matias	6 ft 5 in (1.96 m)	184 lb (83 kg)	1983-11-29	Manila
SF	38	(United States)	Joe Devance	6 ft 8 in (2.03 m)	215 lb (98 kg)	1982-2-19	UTEP

Head coach

- (United States) Tim Cone (George Washington)

Assistant coach(es)

- (Philippines) Richard del Rosario (De La Salle)
- (Philippines) Johnny Abarrientos (Far Eastern)
- (Philippines) Jason Webb (De La Salle)
- (Philippines) Mon Jose

Team manager

- (Philippines) Alvin Patrimonio (Mapúa)

Legend

- (C) Team captain
- (CI) Commissioner's Cup Import
- (GI) Governors' Cup Import
- (EI) EASL Import
- (DP) Unsigned draft pick
- (FA) Free agent
- (IN) Inactive
- (S) Suspended
- (R) Rookie
- Injured

Roster

== Philippine Cup ==
=== Eliminations ===
==== Standings ====
Pos	Team	W	L	PCT	GB	Qualification
1	Barangay Ginebra San Miguel	11	3	.786 (Note: Head-to-head record: Barangay Ginebra 1–0 Rain or Shine)	—	Twice-to-beat in the quarterfinals
2	Rain or Shine Elasto Painters	11	3	.786	—	Twice-to-beat in the quarterfinals
3	Petron Blaze Boosters	10	4	.714	1	Best-of-three quarterfinals
4	Talk 'N Text Tropang Texters	8	6	.571	3	Best-of-three quarterfinals
5	San Mig Super Coffee Mixers	7	7	.500	4	Best-of-three quarterfinals
6	Barako Bull Energy	5	9	.357 (Note: Head-to-head quotient: Barako Bull 1.06, GlobalPort 1.01, Alaska 0.99, Meralco 0.95; eighth seed playoff: Alaska 94–91 Meralco)	6	Best-of-three quarterfinals
7	GlobalPort Batang Pier	5	9	.357	6	Twice-to-win in the quarterfinals
8	Alaska Aces	5	9	.357	6	Twice-to-win in the quarterfinals
9	Meralco Bolts	5	9	.357	6	
10	Air21 Express	3	11	.214	8	

Source: PBA.ph

=== Playoffs ===
==== Bracket ====
Quarterfinals
(#1 twice-to-beat)
1	Barangay Ginebra	97	108
8	Alaska	104	95
(Best-of-3)
4	Talk 'N Text	1
5	San Mig Coffee	2
(#2 twice-to-beat)
2	Rain or Shine	106
7	GlobalPort	96
(Best-of-3)
3	Petron Blaze	2
6	Barako Bull	0

Semifinals (Best-of-7)
1	Barangay Ginebra	3
5	San Mig Coffee	4
2	Rain or Shine	4
3	Petron Blaze	1

Finals (Best-of-7)
5	San Mig Coffee	4
2	Rain or Shine	2

== Commissioner's Cup ==
=== Eliminations ===
==== Standings ====
Pos	Team	W	L	PCT	GB	Qualification
1	Talk 'N Text Tropang Texters	9	0	1.000	—	Twice-to-beat in the quarterfinals
2	San Miguel Beermen	7	2	.778	2	Twice-to-beat in the quarterfinals
3	Alaska Aces	6	3	.667	3	Best-of-three quarterfinals
4	Rain or Shine Elasto Painters	5	4	.556 (Note: Head-to-head record: Rain or Shine 1–0 Meralco)	4	Best-of-three quarterfinals
5	Meralco Bolts	5	4	.556	4	Best-of-three quarterfinals
6	San Mig Super Coffee Mixers	4	5	.444	5	Best-of-three quarterfinals
7	Air21 Express	3	6	.333 (Note: Head-to-head record: Air21 1–0 Barangay Ginebra)	6	Twice-to-win in the quarterfinals
8	Barangay Ginebra San Miguel	3	6	.333	6	Twice-to-win in the quarterfinals
9	Barako Bull Energy	2	7	.222	7	
10	GlobalPort Batang Pier	1	8	.111	8	

Source: PBA.ph

=== Playoffs ===
==== Bracket ====
Quarterfinals
(#1 twice-to-beat)
1	Talk 'N Text	97
8	Barangay Ginebra	84
(Best-of-3)
4	Rain or Shine	2
5	Meralco	1
(#2 twice-to-beat)
2	San Miguel	79	95
7	Air21	92	101**
(Best-of-3)
3	Alaska	1
6	San Mig Coffee	2

Semifinals (Best-of-5)
1	Talk 'N Text	3
4	Rain or Shine	0
7	Air21	2
6	San Mig Coffee	3

Finals (Best-of-5)
1	Talk 'N Text	1
6	San Mig Coffee	3

**double overtime

== Governors' Cup ==
=== Eliminations ===
==== Standings ====
Pos	Team	W	L	PCT	GB	Qualification
1	Talk 'N Text Tropang Texters	7	2	.778	—	Twice-to-beat in the quarterfinals
2	Rain or Shine Elasto Painters	6	3	.667	1	Twice-to-beat in the quarterfinals
3	Alaska Aces	5	4	.556 (Note: Head-to-head quotient: Alaska 1.08, San Mig 1.02, San Miguel 0.99, Barangay Ginebra 0.97, Air21 0.94)	2	Twice-to-beat in the quarterfinals
4	San Mig Super Coffee Mixers	5	4	.556	2	Twice-to-beat in the quarterfinals
5	Petron Blaze Boosters	5	4	.556	2	Twice-to-win in the quarterfinals
6	Barangay Ginebra San Miguel	5	4	.556	2	Twice-to-win in the quarterfinals
7	Air21 Express	5	4	.556	2	Twice-to-win in the quarterfinals
8	Barako Bull Energy	3	6	.333 (Note: Head-to-head record: Barako Bull 95–94 Meralco)	4	Twice-to-win in the quarterfinals
9	Meralco Bolts	3	6	.333	4	
10	GlobalPort Batang Pier	1	8	.111	6	

Source: PBA.ph

==== Bracket ====
Quarterfinals (Top 4 twice-to-beat)
1	Talk 'N Text	99
8	Barako Bull	84
4	San Mig Coffee	97
5	San Miguel	90
2	Rain or Shine	111
7	Air21	90
3	Alaska	92
6	Barangay Ginebra	81

Semifinals (Best-of-5)
1	Talk 'N Text	2
4	San Mig Coffee	3
2	Rain or Shine	3
3	Alaska	2

Finals (Best-of-5)
4	San Mig Coffee	3
2	Rain or Shine	2

== Transactions ==
=== Overview ===
Players Added

Via draft

- Ian Sangalang
- Justin Chua
- JR Cawaling
- Justin Melton

Via trade

- Isaac Holstein
- Ronnie Matias
- Yousef Taha
Players Lost

Via trade

- Justin Chua
- Yancy de Ocampo
- Val Acuña
- Jewel Ponferada
- Leo Najorda

Waived

- Ken Bono

=== Recruited imports ===
Tournament	Name	Debuted	Last game	Record
Commissioner's Cup	James Mays	March 12 (vs. GlobalPort)	May 15 (vs. Talk 'N Text)	12–9
Governors' Cup	Marqus Blakely	May 21 (vs. Barako Bull)	July 9 (vs. Rain or Shine)	12–8
