= 2013–14 Barako Bull Energy season =

- Head coach: Bong Ramos (Philippine Cup/Commissioner's Cup); Siot Tanquincen (Governors' Cup)
- Consultant: Rajko Toroman
- General manager: Raffy Casyao
- Owners: Energy Food and Drinks Inc. (a Lina Group of Companies subsidiary)

Philippine Cup results
- Record: 5–9 (35.7%)
- Place: 6th
- Playoff finish: Quarterfinals (defeated by Petron 2-0.)

Commissioner's Cup results
- Record: 2–7 (22.2%)
- Place: 9th
- Playoff finish: Did not qualify

Governors' Cup results
- Record: 3–6 (33.3%)
- Place: 8th
- Playoff finish: Quarterfinals (def. by Talk 'N Text in one game)

Barako Bull Energy seasons

The 2013–14 Barako Bull Energy was the 12th season of the franchise in the Philippine Basketball Association (PBA).

== Key dates ==
- October 30: Rajko Toroman was relieved as active consultant and assistant coach of the team.
- November 3: The 2013 PBA Draft took place in Midtown Atrium, Robinson Place Manila.
- April 21: Bong Ramos is replaced by Siot Tanquincen as head coach.

== Draft picks ==
Round	Pick	Player	Position	Nationality	PBA D-League team	College
2	4	Jeric Fortuna	PG	Philippines	Black Water Sports	UST
2	10	Carlo Lastimosa	PG	Philippines	Fruitas Shakers	Saint Benilde
3	3	Darwin Cordero				Southern City Coll.
4	2	Jeff Vidal		Philippines		UPHSD
5	2	Mike Silungan		Philippines		UP Diliman

== Roster ==
2013–14 Barako Bull Energy roster
Players
Coaches

Pos.	#	POB	Name	Height	Weight	DOB (YYYY–MM–DD)	From
F/C	1	(Philippines)	Hans Thiele	6 ft 5 in (1.96 m)	200 lb (91 kg)	1984-02-02	UE
G	2	(Philippines)	Dennis Miranda	6 ft 0 in (1.83 m)	170 lb (77 kg)	1982-07-14	Far Eastern
SF	3	(United States)	Jason Deutchman	6 ft 6 in (1.98 m)	212 lb (96 kg)	1986-09-27	San Diego State
C	4	(United States)	Dorian Peña	6 ft 6 in (1.98 m)	235 lb (107 kg)	1977-10-12	Coppin State
G	6	(Philippines)	Carlo Lastimosa (R)	5 ft 11 in (1.80 m)	182 lb (83 kg)	1990-09-03	St. Benilde
G/F	7	(Philippines)	JC Intal	6 ft 4 in (1.93 m)	195 lb (88 kg)	1983-11-18	Ateneo
F	8	(Philippines)	Nico Salva (R)	6 ft 2 in (1.88 m)	194 lb (88 kg)	1990-03-08	Ateneo
PG	9	(Philippines)	Robert Labagala	5 ft 8 in (1.73 m)	170 lb (77 kg)	1984-07-05	UE
F/C	10	(Philippines)	Dave Marcelo	6 ft 5 in (1.96 m)	227 lb (103 kg)	1989-02-22	San Beda
G	11	(Philippines)	Willie Miller	5 ft 11 in (1.80 m)	180 lb (82 kg)	1977-07-13	Letran
PF	12	(Philippines)	Mark Isip	6 ft 4 in (1.93 m)	215 lb (98 kg)	1980-12-10	Far Eastern
G	13	(Philippines)	Bonbon Custodio	5 ft 11 in (1.80 m)	185 lb (84 kg)		UE
SF	14	(Philippines)	Leo Najorda	6 ft 3 in (1.91 m)	190 lb (86 kg)		San Sebastian
PG	18	(Philippines)	Jeric Fortuna (R)	5 ft 7 in (1.70 m)	170 lb (77 kg)	1991-11-25	UST
F	28	(United States)	Willy Wilson	6 ft 3 in (1.91 m)	200 lb (91 kg)	1980-01-30	De La Salle
F	32	(United States)	Keith Jensen	6 ft 4 in (1.93 m)	185 lb (84 kg)	1988-01-07	NYU
C	88	(Australia)	Mick Pennisi	6 ft 9 in (2.06 m)	235 lb (107 kg)	1975-03-13	Eastern Michigan

Head coach

- (Philippines) Siot Tanquincen (UST)

Assistant coach(es)

- (Philippines) Art dela Cruz (San Sebastian)
- (Philippines) Koy Banal (Mapúa)
- (Philippines) Jigs Mendoza
- (Philippines) Paolo Rivero

Team manager

- (Philippines) Raffy Casyao

Legend

- (C) Team captain
- (CI) Commissioner's Cup Import
- (GI) Governors' Cup Import
- (EI) EASL Import
- (DP) Unsigned draft pick
- (FA) Free agent
- (IN) Inactive
- (S) Suspended
- (R) Rookie
- Injured

Roster

== Philippine Cup ==
=== Eliminations ===
==== Standings ====
Pos	Team	W	L	PCT	GB	Qualification
1	Barangay Ginebra San Miguel	11	3	.786 (Note: Head-to-head record: Barangay Ginebra 1–0 Rain or Shine)	—	Twice-to-beat in the quarterfinals
2	Rain or Shine Elasto Painters	11	3	.786	—	Twice-to-beat in the quarterfinals
3	Petron Blaze Boosters	10	4	.714	1	Best-of-three quarterfinals
4	Talk 'N Text Tropang Texters	8	6	.571	3	Best-of-three quarterfinals
5	San Mig Super Coffee Mixers	7	7	.500	4	Best-of-three quarterfinals
6	Barako Bull Energy	5	9	.357 (Note: Head-to-head quotient: Barako Bull 1.06, GlobalPort 1.01, Alaska 0.99, Meralco 0.95; eighth seed playoff: Alaska 94–91 Meralco)	6	Best-of-three quarterfinals
7	GlobalPort Batang Pier	5	9	.357	6	Twice-to-win in the quarterfinals
8	Alaska Aces	5	9	.357	6	Twice-to-win in the quarterfinals
9	Meralco Bolts	5	9	.357	6	
10	Air21 Express	3	11	.214	8	

Source: PBA.ph

== Commissioner's Cup ==
=== Eliminations ===
==== Standings ====
Pos	Team	W	L	PCT	GB	Qualification
1	Talk 'N Text Tropang Texters	9	0	1.000	—	Twice-to-beat in the quarterfinals
2	San Miguel Beermen	7	2	.778	2	Twice-to-beat in the quarterfinals
3	Alaska Aces	6	3	.667	3	Best-of-three quarterfinals
4	Rain or Shine Elasto Painters	5	4	.556 (Note: Head-to-head record: Rain or Shine 1–0 Meralco)	4	Best-of-three quarterfinals
5	Meralco Bolts	5	4	.556	4	Best-of-three quarterfinals
6	San Mig Super Coffee Mixers	4	5	.444	5	Best-of-three quarterfinals
7	Air21 Express	3	6	.333 (Note: Head-to-head record: Air21 1–0 Barangay Ginebra)	6	Twice-to-win in the quarterfinals
8	Barangay Ginebra San Miguel	3	6	.333	6	Twice-to-win in the quarterfinals
9	Barako Bull Energy	2	7	.222	7	
10	GlobalPort Batang Pier	1	8	.111	8	

Source: PBA.ph

== Governors' Cup ==
=== Eliminations ===
==== Standings ====
Pos	Team	W	L	PCT	GB	Qualification
1	Talk 'N Text Tropang Texters	7	2	.778	—	Twice-to-beat in the quarterfinals
2	Rain or Shine Elasto Painters	6	3	.667	1	Twice-to-beat in the quarterfinals
3	Alaska Aces	5	4	.556 (Note: Head-to-head quotient: Alaska 1.08, San Mig 1.02, San Miguel 0.99, Barangay Ginebra 0.97, Air21 0.94)	2	Twice-to-beat in the quarterfinals
4	San Mig Super Coffee Mixers	5	4	.556	2	Twice-to-beat in the quarterfinals
5	Petron Blaze Boosters	5	4	.556	2	Twice-to-win in the quarterfinals
6	Barangay Ginebra San Miguel	5	4	.556	2	Twice-to-win in the quarterfinals
7	Air21 Express	5	4	.556	2	Twice-to-win in the quarterfinals
8	Barako Bull Energy	3	6	.333 (Note: Head-to-head record: Barako Bull 95–94 Meralco)	4	Twice-to-win in the quarterfinals
9	Meralco Bolts	3	6	.333	4	
10	GlobalPort Batang Pier	1	8	.111	6	

Source: PBA.ph

==== Bracket ====
Quarterfinals (Top 4 twice-to-beat)
1	Talk 'N Text	99
8	Barako Bull	84
4	San Mig Coffee	97
5	San Miguel	90
2	Rain or Shine	111
7	Air21	90
3	Alaska	92
6	Barangay Ginebra	81

Semifinals (Best-of-5)
1	Talk 'N Text	2
4	San Mig Coffee	3
2	Rain or Shine	3
3	Alaska	2

Finals (Best-of-5)
4	San Mig Coffee	3
2	Rain or Shine	2

== Transactions ==
=== Trades ===
==== Pre-season ====
October 31, 2013	To Barako Bull Robert Labagala	To Barangay Ginebra Emman Monfort

=== Recruited imports ===
Tournament	Name	Debuted	Last game	Record
Commissioner's Cup	Joshua Dollard	March 7 (vs. Barangay Ginebra)	April 13 (vs. GlobalPort)	2–7
Governors' Cup	Eric Wise	May 18 (vs. Meralco)	June 3 (vs. Barangay Ginebra)	1–5
Governors' Cup	Allen Durham	June 8 (vs. GlobalPort)	June 17 (vs. Talk 'N Text)	2–2
