= 2013–14 Meralco Bolts season =

- Head coach: Ryan Gregorio
- General manager: Butch Antonio
- Owners: Manila Electric Company (an MVP Group subsidiary)

Philippine Cup results
- Record: 5–9 (35.7%)
- Place: 9th
- Playoff finish: Did not qualify (Def. by Alaska on the do-or-die game for the eight seed)

Commissioner's Cup results
- Record: 5–4 (55.6%)
- Place: 4th (tied with Rain or Shine)
- Playoff finish: Quarterfinals (Def. by Rain or Shine 2–1)

Governors' Cup results
- Record: 3–6 (33.3%)
- Place: 9th
- Playoff finish: Did not qualify

Meralco Bolts seasons

The 2013–14 Meralco Bolts season was the 4th season of the franchise in the Philippine Basketball Association (PBA).

== Key dates ==
- November 3: The 2013 PBA Draft took place in Midtown Atrium, Robinson Place Manila.

== Draft picks ==
Round	Pick	Player	Position	Nationality	PBA D-League team	College
3	6	Anjo Caram	PG	Philippines	Fruitas Shakers	San Beda
4	5	Mike Parala	PF	Philippines	Café France Bakers	Mapua
5	4	Mark Lopez	PG	Philippines	Café France Bakers	UP Diliman
6	2	Ron Guevarra	PG	Philippines	None	St. Francis
7	1	Mark Bringas	PF	Philippines	Cagayan Rising Suns	FEU

== Roster ==
2013–14 Meralco Bolts roster
Players
Coaches

Pos.	#	POB	Name	Height	Weight	DOB (YYYY–MM–DD)	From
SF	3	(Philippines)	Nelbert Omolon	6 ft 4 in (1.93 m)	185 lb (84 kg)	1980-06-30	Philippine Christian
SG	4	(Philippines)	John Wilson	6 ft 2 in (1.88 m)	190 lb (86 kg)	1987-01-18	José Rizal
PG	5	(Canada)	A. J. Mandani	6 ft 0 in (1.83 m)	185 lb (84 kg)	1987-01-01	Missouri S&T
PF	7	(United States)	Cliff Hodge	6 ft 5 in (1.96 m)	195 lb (88 kg)	1988-02-03	Reedley
F/C	10	(Philippines)	Danny Ildefonso	6 ft 6 in (1.98 m)	210 lb (95 kg)	1976-12-09	National-U
PG	11	(United States)	Mike Cortez	5 ft 11 in (1.80 m)	170 lb (77 kg)	1980-11-10	De La Salle
F/C	15	(Philippines)	James Sena	6 ft 5 in (1.96 m)	215 lb (98 kg)	1988-08-31	José Rizal
PG	16	(Philippines)	Paul Artadi	5 ft 9 in (1.75 m)	150 lb (68 kg)	1981-05-05	UE
PG	17	(Philippines)	Anjo Caram	5 ft 8 in (1.73 m)	150 lb (68 kg)	1991-01-14	San Beda
G/F	20	(United States)	Jared Dillinger (C)	6 ft 5 in (1.96 m)	220 lb (100 kg)	1984-01-06	Air Force
PF	21	(Philippines)	Reynel Hugnatan	6 ft 4 in (1.93 m)	210 lb (95 kg)	1978-11-03	Manila
SG	24	(Philippines)	Rey Guevarra	6 ft 4 in (1.93 m)	175 lb (79 kg)	1985-11-24	Letran
PF	25	(Philippines)	Rabeh Al-Hussaini	6 ft 7 in (2.01 m)	240 lb (109 kg)	1988-08-11	Ateneo
F/C	27	(Philippines)	Mark Bringas	6 ft 4 in (1.93 m)	210 lb (95 kg)	1988-04-27	Far Eastern
SG	28	(Philippines)	Gary David	6 ft 2 in (1.88 m)	170 lb (77 kg)	1978-07-13	Lyceum
SF	80	(Philippines)	Sunday Salvacion	6 ft 3 in (1.91 m)	190 lb (86 kg)	1978-12-17	St. Benilde

Head coach

- Ryan Gregorio (UP Diliman)

Assistant coach(es)

- Ronnie Magsanoc (UP Diliman)
- Nash Racela (De La Salle)
- Patrick Fran (UST)
- Xavier Nunag (UP Diliman)

Team manager

- Butch Antonio

Legend

- (C) Team captain
- (CI) Commissioner's Cup Import
- (GI) Governors' Cup Import
- (EI) EASL Import
- (DP) Unsigned draft pick
- (FA) Free agent
- (IN) Inactive
- (S) Suspended
- (R) Rookie
- Injured

== Philippine Cup ==
=== Eliminations ===
==== Standings ====
Pos	Team	W	L	PCT	GB	Qualification
1	Barangay Ginebra San Miguel	11	3	.786 (Note: Head-to-head record: Barangay Ginebra 1–0 Rain or Shine)	—	Twice-to-beat in the quarterfinals
2	Rain or Shine Elasto Painters	11	3	.786	—	Twice-to-beat in the quarterfinals
3	Petron Blaze Boosters	10	4	.714	1	Best-of-three quarterfinals
4	Talk 'N Text Tropang Texters	8	6	.571	3	Best-of-three quarterfinals
5	San Mig Super Coffee Mixers	7	7	.500	4	Best-of-three quarterfinals
6	Barako Bull Energy	5	9	.357 (Note: Head-to-head quotient: Barako Bull 1.06, GlobalPort 1.01, Alaska 0.99, Meralco 0.95; eighth seed playoff: Alaska 94–91 Meralco)	6	Best-of-three quarterfinals
7	GlobalPort Batang Pier	5	9	.357	6	Twice-to-win in the quarterfinals
8	Alaska Aces	5	9	.357	6	Twice-to-win in the quarterfinals
9	Meralco Bolts	5	9	.357	6	
10	Air21 Express	3	11	.214	8	

Source: PBA.ph

==== Game log ====
2013 PBA Philippine Cup game log
November

Game	Date	Opponent	Score	High points	High rebounds	High assists	Location Attendance	Record	
1	November 17	Talk 'N Text	80–89	David (26)	Dillinger (9)	Cortez (7)	Cebu Coliseum	0–1	Boxscore
2	November 22	Rain or Shine	89–94	David (24)	Hodge (10)	Cortez (6)	Cuneta Astrodome	0–2	Boxscore
3	November 27	Air21	112–79	Wilson (26)	Al-Hussaini (10)	Cortez (6)	Smart Araneta Coliseum	1–2	Boxscore

December

Game	Date	Opponent	Score	High points	High rebounds	High assists	Location Attendance	Record
4	December 3	Ginebra					Mall of Asia Arena	
5	December 6	GlobalPort					Smart Araneta Coliseum	
6	December 11	San Mig Coffee					Smart Araneta Coliseum	
7	December 14	Petron Blaze					Dipolog	
8	December 18	Alaska					Mall of Asia Arena	
9	December 22	Barako Bull					Mall of Asia Arena	
10	December 28	Ginebra					Mall of Asia Arena	

January

Game	Date	Opponent	Score	High points	High rebounds	High assists	Location Attendance	Record
11	January 4	Air21					Mall of Asia Arena	
12	January 10	Alaska					Smart Araneta Coliseum	
13	January 15	Rain or Shine					Smart Araneta Coliseum	
14	January 18	Petron Blaze					Smart Araneta Coliseum	

2013–14 schedule

=== Playoffs ===
==== Bracket ====
Quarterfinals
(#1 twice-to-beat)
1	Barangay Ginebra	97	108
8	Alaska	104	95
(Best-of-3)
4	Talk 'N Text	1
5	San Mig Coffee	2
(#2 twice-to-beat)
2	Rain or Shine	106
7	GlobalPort	96
(Best-of-3)
3	Petron Blaze	2
6	Barako Bull	0

Semifinals (Best-of-7)
1	Barangay Ginebra	3
5	San Mig Coffee	4
2	Rain or Shine	4
3	Petron Blaze	1

Finals (Best-of-7)
5	San Mig Coffee	4
2	Rain or Shine	2

== Commissioner's Cup ==
=== Eliminations ===
==== Standings ====
Pos	Team	W	L	PCT	GB	Qualification
1	Talk 'N Text Tropang Texters	9	0	1.000	—	Twice-to-beat in the quarterfinals
2	San Miguel Beermen	7	2	.778	2	Twice-to-beat in the quarterfinals
3	Alaska Aces	6	3	.667	3	Best-of-three quarterfinals
4	Rain or Shine Elasto Painters	5	4	.556 (Note: Head-to-head record: Rain or Shine 1–0 Meralco)	4	Best-of-three quarterfinals
5	Meralco Bolts	5	4	.556	4	Best-of-three quarterfinals
6	San Mig Super Coffee Mixers	4	5	.444	5	Best-of-three quarterfinals
7	Air21 Express	3	6	.333 (Note: Head-to-head record: Air21 1–0 Barangay Ginebra)	6	Twice-to-win in the quarterfinals
8	Barangay Ginebra San Miguel	3	6	.333	6	Twice-to-win in the quarterfinals
9	Barako Bull Energy	2	7	.222	7	
10	GlobalPort Batang Pier	1	8	.111	8	

Source: PBA.ph

=== Playoffs ===
==== Bracket ====
Quarterfinals
(#1 twice-to-beat)
1	Talk 'N Text	97
8	Barangay Ginebra	84
(Best-of-3)
4	Rain or Shine	2
5	Meralco	1
(#2 twice-to-beat)
2	San Miguel	79	95
7	Air21	92	101**
(Best-of-3)
3	Alaska	1
6	San Mig Coffee	2

Semifinals (Best-of-5)
1	Talk 'N Text	3
4	Rain or Shine	0
7	Air21	2
6	San Mig Coffee	3

Finals (Best-of-5)
1	Talk 'N Text	1
6	San Mig Coffee	3

**double overtime

== Governors' Cup ==
=== Eliminations ===
==== Standings ====
Pos	Team	W	L	PCT	GB	Qualification
1	Talk 'N Text Tropang Texters	7	2	.778	—	Twice-to-beat in the quarterfinals
2	Rain or Shine Elasto Painters	6	3	.667	1	Twice-to-beat in the quarterfinals
3	Alaska Aces	5	4	.556 (Note: Head-to-head quotient: Alaska 1.08, San Mig 1.02, San Miguel 0.99, Barangay Ginebra 0.97, Air21 0.94)	2	Twice-to-beat in the quarterfinals
4	San Mig Super Coffee Mixers	5	4	.556	2	Twice-to-beat in the quarterfinals
5	Petron Blaze Boosters	5	4	.556	2	Twice-to-win in the quarterfinals
6	Barangay Ginebra San Miguel	5	4	.556	2	Twice-to-win in the quarterfinals
7	Air21 Express	5	4	.556	2	Twice-to-win in the quarterfinals
8	Barako Bull Energy	3	6	.333 (Note: Head-to-head record: Barako Bull 95–94 Meralco)	4	Twice-to-win in the quarterfinals
9	Meralco Bolts	3	6	.333	4	
10	GlobalPort Batang Pier	1	8	.111	6	

Source: PBA.ph

== Transactions ==
=== Overview ===
Players added

Via trade

- Gary David
- AJ Mandani
- Rabeh Al-Hussaini
- Nelbert Omolon
Players lost

Via trade

- Mark Cardona
- Chris Ross
- Chris Timberlake
- Nonoy Baclao
- Jay-R Reyes

Via free agency

- Josh Vanlandingham

Waived

- Allan Mangahas

=== Trades ===
==== Pre-season ====
October 22, 2013	To Meralco Kerby Raymundo	To Barangay Ginebra Jay-R Reyes

=== Recruited imports ===
Tournament	Name	Debuted	Last game	Record
Commissioner's Cup	Brian Butch	March 7 (vs. San Miguel)	March 26 (vs. Rain or Shine)	3–3
Commissioner's Cup	Darnell Jackson	April 2 (vs. Barangay Ginebra)	April 26 (vs. Rain or Shine)	3–3
Governors' Cup	Terrence Williams	May 18 (vs. Barako Bull)	May 24 (vs. Barangay Ginebra)	0–3
Governors' Cup	Mario West	May 27 (vs. San Mig Super Coffee)	June 14 (vs. GlobalPort)	3–3
