= Yousef Taha =

Filipino-Palestinian basketball player

Free agent
- Position: Center

Personal information
- Born: July 8, 1988 (age 38) Kuwait
- Listed height: 6 ft 8 in (2.03 m)
- Listed weight: 240 lb (109 kg)

Career information
- High school: Trinity Christian (Lubbock, Texas)
- College: North Lake College; Mapúa
- PBA draft: 2012: 2nd round, 11th overall pick
- Drafted by: Air21 Express
- Playing career: 2012–present

Career history
- 2012: Air21 Express
- 2012–2013: Barangay Ginebra San Miguel
- 2013: GlobalPort Batang Pier
- 2013–2014: Petron Blaze Boosters
- 2014: GlobalPort Batang Pier
- 2014–2016: San Mig Super Coffee Mixers / Purefoods Star Hotshots / Star Hotshots
- 2017–2018: GlobalPort Batang Pier
- 2018–2019: TNT KaTropa
- 2021–2022: Alaska Aces
- 2022–2023: Blackwater Bossing
- 2024: NLEX Road Warriors
- 2025: Abra Solid North Weavers
- 2025: Phoenix Fuel Masters

Career highlights
- PBA champion (2014 Governors')

Yousef S. Taha (born July 8, 1988) is a Filipino-Palestinian professional basketball player who last played for the Phoenix Fuel Masters of the Philippine Basketball Association (PBA). He was selected 11th overall in the 2012 PBA draft by the Air21 Express.

== Professional career ==
In the middle of the 2012–13 Philippine Cup, Taha was traded from the Air21 to Ginebra. Then before the 2013 Governors' Cup, Taha was again traded, this time to the GlobalPort Batang Pier. Petron Blaze Boosters, got him in a trade with the Batang Pier which gave them the Blaze Boosters' 5th overall pick in 2013 PBA draft In the middle of 2014 PBA Commissioner's Cup playoffs which San Miguel Beermen is eliminated by Air21 Express, Taha was again traded to GlobalPort Batang Pier in exchange for Justin Chua and he will make return in GlobalPort. On June 4, 2014, Taha was again traded by GlobalPort Batang Pier to San Mig Super Coffee Mixers in exchange for Yancy De Ocampo and Val Acuña.

On November 28, 2016, Taha announced on a letter that he will be going back to his hometown country of Kuwait for personal reasons, thus ending his short career in the PBA. The leave was only for a short while, however, as he returned to the Philippines to play with the team again in 2017–18 PBA season. On November 29, 2017, exactly a year and a day after his "retirement", he officially signed a two-year contract with GlobalPort.

On April 3, 2018, Taha, along with Terrence Romeo, was traded to the TNT KaTropa for Moala Tautuaa and two future draft picks.

On February 19, 2021, he signed a one-year deal with the Alaska Aces. Exactly one year later, he signed a one-year extension with the team.

On May 21, 2022, Taha was traded to the Blackwater Bossing for Kurt Lojera. Two days after, he signed a one-year extension with the team.

On February 26, 2024, Taha was traded to the NLEX Road Warriors in a three-team trade involving NLEX, Blackwater, and TNT Tropang Giga.

On September 19, 2025, Taha signed with the Phoenix Fuel Masters, making his comeback to the PBA.

== PBA career statistics ==
Legend
GP	Games played	MPG	Minutes per game	FG%	Field-goal percentage
3FG%	3-point field-goal percentage	4P%	4-point field-goal percentage	FT%	Free-throw percentage
RPG	Rebounds per game	APG	Assists per game	SPG	Steals per game
BPG	Blocks per game	PPG	Points per game	127	Career high

As of the end of 2025–26 season

=== Season-by-season averages ===
Year	Team	GP	MPG	FG%	3P%	4P%	FT%	RPG	APG	SPG	BPG	PPG
2012–13	Air21	37	11.7	.341	—	—	.522	4.1	.7	.3	.4	2.5
2012–13	Barangay Ginebra	37	11.7	.341	—	—	.522	4.1	.7	.3	.4	2.5
2012–13	GlobalPort	37	11.7	.341	—	—	.522	4.1	.7	.3	.4	2.5
2013–14	Petron / San Miguel	23	8.8	.400	—	—	.611	2.1	.4	.2	.2	1.9
2013–14	GlobalPort	23	8.8	.400	—	—	.611	2.1	.4	.2	.2	1.9
2013–14	San Mig Super Coffee	23	8.8	.400	—	—	.611	2.1	.4	.2	.2	1.9
2014–15	Purefoods / Star	31	15.1	.500	.000	—	.560	4.2	.9	.3	.5	4.2
2015–16	Star	23	18.9	.525	—	—	.500	6.0	.9	.4	.3	4.5
2015–16	GlobalPort	23	18.9	.525	—	—	.500	6.0	.9	.4	.3	4.5
2017–18	GlobalPort	20	11.5	.466	.200	—	.533	3.4	.5	.2	.3	3.2
2017–18	TNT	20	11.5	.466	.200	—	.533	3.4	.5	.2	.3	3.2
2019	TNT	40	12.4	.429	.000	—	.540	3.4	.6	.3	.4	3.2
2021	Alaska	16	23.2	.471	.500	—	.620	6.4	1.5	.6	.8	8.1
2022–23	Blackwater	30	18.5	.465	.000	—	.538	5.9	1.8	.4	.6	6.6
2023–24	NLEX	2	13.8	.333	—	—	—	3.5	—	.5	—	1.0
2025–26	Phoenix	6	19.0	.538	—	—	.462	4.5	.7	.7	.7	3.3
Career		228	14.5	.454	.100	—	.546	4.3	.9	.3	.4	4.0
