= 2014 PBA Governors' Cup =

- Duration: May 18 – July 9, 2014
- TV partner(s): Sports5; Local: TV5/AksyonTV; International : AksyonTV International, Fox Sports PBA HD on Cignal (high-definition)

Finals
- Champions: San Mig Super Coffee Mixers
- Runners-up: Rain or Shine Elasto Painters

Awards
- Best Player: Ranidel de Ocampo (Talk 'N Text Tropang Texters)
- Best Import: Arizona Reid (Rain or Shine Elasto Painters)
- Finals MVP: James Yap (San Mig Super Coffee Mixers)

PBA Governors' Cup chronology
- < 2013 2015 >

PBA conference chronology
- < 2014 Commissioner's 2014–15 Philippine >

The 2014 Philippine Basketball Association (PBA) Governors' Cup, also known as the 2014 PLDT Home TelPad-PBA Governors' Cup for sponsorship reasons, was the third and last conference of the 2013–14 PBA season. The conference began on May 18 and ended on July 9, 2014.

The tournament is an import-laden format, which requires an import or a pure-foreign player for each team, The recruited imports must be not taller than 6 feet and 5 inches for every team.

Games in the tournament are televised by TV5 and AksyonTV; games are also being simulcast in high definition through a special channel exclusive to Cignal Digital TV subscribers.

== Format ==
The tournament format for this conference is as follows:

- Single-round robin eliminations; 9 games per team; Teams are then seeded by basis on win–loss records.
- Top eight teams will advance to the quarterfinals. Ties are broken among head-to-head records of the tied teams.
- Quarterfinals (higher seed with the twice to beat advantage):
  - QF1: #1 seed vs #8 seed
  - QF2: #2 seed vs #7 seed
  - QF3: #3 seed vs #6 seed
  - QF4: #4 seed vs #5 seed
- Semifinals (best-of-5 series):
  - SF1: QF1 vs. QF4 winners
  - SF2: QF2 vs. QF3 winners
- Finals (best-of-5 series)
  - Winners of the semifinals

Due to the need to finish the season and the tournament by June in order for the Gilas Pilipinas team to train for the upcoming FIBA Asia Cup in July, the FIBA World Cup in August and the Asian Games in September, the league had six playing dates per week and the quotient system was implemented for tiebreakers, instead of playoff games for the #4 and #8 seeds.

== Elimination round ==
=== Team standings ===
Pos	Team	W	L	PCT	GB	Qualification
1	Talk 'N Text Tropang Texters	7	2	.778	—	Twice-to-beat in the quarterfinals
2	Rain or Shine Elasto Painters	6	3	.667	1	Twice-to-beat in the quarterfinals
3	Alaska Aces	5	4	.556 (Note: Head-to-head quotient: Alaska 1.08, San Mig 1.02, San Miguel 0.99, Barangay Ginebra 0.97, Air21 0.94)	2	Twice-to-beat in the quarterfinals
4	San Mig Super Coffee Mixers	5	4	.556	2	Twice-to-beat in the quarterfinals
5	Petron Blaze Boosters	5	4	.556	2	Twice-to-win in the quarterfinals
6	Barangay Ginebra San Miguel	5	4	.556	2	Twice-to-win in the quarterfinals
7	Air21 Express	5	4	.556	2	Twice-to-win in the quarterfinals
8	Barako Bull Energy	3	6	.333 (Note: Head-to-head record: Barako Bull 95–94 Meralco)	4	Twice-to-win in the quarterfinals
9	Meralco Bolts	3	6	.333	4	
10	GlobalPort Batang Pier	1	8	.111	6	

Source: PBA.ph

=== Schedule ===
Team ╲ Game	1	2	3	4	5	6	7	8	9
Air21	ROS	BBE	BGSM	ALA	TNT	MER	SMSC	GP	SMB
Alaska	SMB	GP	TNT	A21	MER	ROS	SMSC	BGSM	BBE
Barako Bull	MER	SMSC	A21	SMB	ROS	BGSM	GP	TNT	ALA
Barangay Ginebra	GP	MER	A21	SMSC	BBE	ROS	SMB	ALA	TNT
GlobalPort	BGSM	ALA	ROS	SMSC	SMB	TNT	BBE	A21	MER
Meralco	BBE	TNT	BGSM	SMSC	ALA	A21	SMB	ROS	GP
Rain or Shine	A21	SMB	GP	TNT	BBE	ALA	BGSM	MER	SMSC
San Mig Super Coffee	BBE	SMB	MER	GP	BGSM	ALA	A21	TNT	ROS
San Miguel	ALA	ROS	SMSC	BBE	TNT	GP	MER	BGSM	A21
Talk 'N Text	MER	ALA	ROS	SMB	A21	GP	BBE	SMSC	BGSM

= Win; = OT win; = Loss; = OT loss

=== Results ===
Team	A21	ALA	BBE	BGSM	GP	MER	ROS	SMSC	SMB	TNT
Air21		91–88	101–86	76–84	106–102	80–67	103–96	109–113*	88–101	91–102
Alaska	–		90–87	79–66	91–95	87–88	72–123	93–84	94–87	103–91
Barako Bull	–	–		70–98	122–98	95–94	93–96	66–76	112–115*	88–74
Barangay Ginebra	–	–	–		89–71	95–82	108–117	90–102	105–98	92–96
GlobalPort	–	–	–	–		95–123	97–119	82–92	99–102	82–97
Meralco	–	–	–	–	–		85–104	90–108	90–74	99–105
Rain or Shine	–	–	–	–	–	–		95–94	92–97	81–83
San Mig Super Coffee	–	–	–	–	–	–	–		90–92	88–92
San Miguel	–	–	–	–	–	–	–	–		97–103
Talk 'N Text	–	–	–	–	–	–	–	–	–	

Legend: Blue = left column team win; Red = top row team win.
Matches with lighter background shading were decided after overtime.

== Bracket ==
Quarterfinals
(#1 twice to beat)
1	Talk 'N Text	99
8	Barako Bull	84
(#4 twice to beat)
4	San Mig Coffee	97
5	San Miguel	90
(#2 twice to beat)
2	Rain or Shine	111
7	Air21	90
(#3 twice to beat)
3	Alaska	92
6	Barangay Ginebra	81

Semifinals (best-of-5)
1	Talk 'N Text	2
4	San Mig Coffee	3
2	Rain or Shine	3
3	Alaska	2

Finals (best-of-5)
4	San Mig Coffee	3
2	Rain or Shine	2

== Quarterfinals ==
=== (1) Talk 'N Text vs. (8) Barako Bull ===
June 17

Talk 'N Text Tropang Texters 99, Barako Bull Energy 84
Talk 'N Text wins series in one game

Smart Araneta Coliseum, Quezon City

=== (2) Rain or Shine vs. (7) Air21 ===
June 18

Rain or Shine Elasto Painters 111, Air21 Express 90
Rain or Shine wins series in one game

Smart Araneta Coliseum, Quezon City

=== (3) Alaska vs. (6) Barangay Ginebra ===
June 18

Alaska Aces 92, Barangay Ginebra San Miguel 81
Alaska wins series in one game

Smart Araneta Coliseum, Quezon City

=== (4) San Mig Super Coffee vs. (5) San Miguel ===
June 17

San Mig Super Coffee Mixers 97, San Miguel Beermen 90
San Mig Super Coffee wins series in one game

Smart Araneta Coliseum, Quezon City

== Semifinals ==
=== (1) Talk 'N Text vs. (4) San Mig Super Coffee ===
June 19

Talk 'N Text Tropang Texters 88, San Mig Super Coffee Mixers 92 (OT)

Smart Araneta Coliseum, Quezon City

June 21

Talk 'N Text Tropang Texters 85, San Mig Super Coffee Mixers 93

Smart Araneta Coliseum, Quezon City

June 23

Talk 'N Text Tropang Texters 112, San Mig Super Coffee Mixers 86

Smart Araneta Coliseum, Quezon City

June 25

Talk 'N Text Tropang Texters 84, San Mig Super Coffee Mixers 81 (OT)

Smart Araneta Coliseum, Quezon City

June 27

Talk 'N Text Tropang Texters 87, San Mig Super Coffee Mixers 93
San Mig Super Coffee wins series, 3–2

Smart Araneta Coliseum, Quezon City

=== (2) Rain or Shine vs. (3) Alaska ===
June 20

Rain or Shine Elasto Painters 93, Alaska Aces 97

Smart Araneta Coliseum, Quezon City

June 22

Rain or Shine Elasto Painters 99, Alaska Aces 87

Smart Araneta Coliseum, Quezon City

June 24

Rain or Shine Elasto Painters 94, Alaska Aces 104

Smart Araneta Coliseum, Quezon City

June 26

Rain or Shine Elasto Painters 123, Alaska Aces 121 (OT)

Smart Araneta Coliseum, Quezon City

June 28

Rain or Shine Elasto Painters 97, Alaska Aces 94
Rain or Shine wins series, 3–2

Smart Araneta Coliseum, Quezon City

== Finals ==
July 1

Rain or Shine Elasto Painters 101, San Mig Super Coffee Mixers 104

Mall of Asia Arena, Pasay

July 3

Rain or Shine Elasto Painters 89, San Mig Super Coffee Mixers 87 (OT)

Smart Araneta Coliseum, Quezon City

July 5

Rain or Shine Elasto Painters 69, San Mig Super Coffee Mixers 78

Smart Araneta Coliseum, Quezon City

July 7

Rain or Shine Elasto Painters 88, San Mig Super Coffee Mixers 79

Smart Araneta Coliseum, Quezon City

July 9

Rain or Shine Elasto Painters 89, San Mig Super Coffee Mixers 92
San Mig Super Coffee wins series, 3–2

Smart Araneta Coliseum, Quezon City

== Awards ==
=== Conference ===
- Best Player of the Conference: Ranidel de Ocampo (Talk 'N Text Tropang Texters)
- Best Import of the Conference: Arizona Reid (Rain or Shine Elasto Painters)
- Finals MVP: James Yap (San Mig Super Coffee Mixers)

=== Players of the Week ===
Week	Player	Ref.
May 19–25	Asi Taulava (Air21 Express)	
May 26–June 1	Peter June Simon (San Mig Super Coffee Mixers)	
June 2–8	Jeffrei Chan (Rain or Shine Elasto Painters)	
June 16–22	Joe Devance (San Mig Super Coffee Mixers)	
June 23–29	Paul Lee (Rain or Shine Elasto Painters)	

== Imports ==
The following is the list of imports which had played for their respective teams at least once, with the returning imports in italics. Highlighted are the imports who stayed with their respective teams for the whole conference.

Team	Name	Debuted	Last game	Record
Air21 Express	Dominique Sutton	May 20 (vs. Rain or Shine)	June 18 (vs. Rain or Shine)	5–5
Alaska Aces	Henry Walker	May 18 (vs. San Miguel)	June 28 (vs. Rain or Shine)	8–7
Barako Bull Energy	Eric Wise	May 18 (vs. Meralco)	June 3 (vs. Barangay Ginebra)	1–5
Barako Bull Energy	Allen Durham	June 8 (vs. GlobalPort)	June 17 (vs. Talk 'N Text)	2–2
Barangay Ginebra San Miguel	Zaccheus Mason	May 20 (vs. GlobalPort)	June 18 (vs. Alaska)	5–5
GlobalPort Batang Pier	LeRoy Hickerson	May 20 (vs. Barangay Ginebra)	May 25 (vs. Rain or Shine)	1–2
GlobalPort Batang Pier	Dior Lowhorn	May 30 (vs. San Mig Super Coffee)	June 14 (vs. Meralco)	0–6
Meralco Bolts	Terrence Williams	May 18 (vs. Barako Bull)	May 24 (vs. Barangay Ginebra)	0–3
Meralco Bolts	Mario West	May 27 (vs. San Mig Super Coffee)	June 14 (vs. GlobalPort)	3–3
Rain or Shine Elasto Painters	Arizona Reid	May 20 (vs. Air21)	July 9 (vs. San Mig Super Coffee)	12–8
San Mig Super Coffee Mixers	Marqus Blakely	May 21 (vs. Barako Bull)	July 9 (vs. Rain or Shine)	12–8
San Miguel Beermen	Reggie Williams	May 18 (vs. Alaska)	June 17 (vs. San Mig Super Coffee)	5–5
Talk 'N Text Tropang Texters	Othyus Jeffers	May 21 (vs. Meralco)		1–0
Talk 'N Text Tropang Texters	No Import	May 26 (vs. Alaska)		0–1
Talk 'N Text Tropang Texters	Rodney Carney	May 28 (vs. Rain or Shine)	June 2 (vs. Air21)	3–0
Talk 'N Text Tropang Texters	Paul Harris	June 6 (vs. GlobalPort)	June 27 (vs. San Mig Super Coffee)	6–4
