= Z. Mason =

American basketball player (born 1991)

Personal information
- Born: January 21, 1991 (age 35) Nashville, Tennessee
- Listed height: 6 ft 6 in (1.98 m)
- Listed weight: 237.6 lb (108 kg)

Career information
- High school: Christ Presbyterian Academy (Nashville, Temnessee)
- College: Chattanooga (2011–2014)
- NBA draft: 2014: undrafted
- Playing career: 2014–present
- Position: Forward / center

Career history
- 2014: Barangay Ginebra San Miguel
- 2014: Hyères-Toulon

Career highlights
- SoCon Defensive Player of the Year (2014); First-team All-SoCon (2014)

Zaccheus Marvin "Z." Mason (born January 21, 1991) is an American basketball and a former American football player, who last played with Hyères-Toulon Var Basket of France's second division. He previously played for Barangay Ginebra San Miguel on the 2014 PBA Governors' Cup as an import.

He first played football for Christ Presbyterian Academy with a scout grade of 81 before he played basketball as an import for Barangay Ginebra San Miguel, his first professional basketball experience.

== College career ==
Mason played college football for the Ole Miss Rebels.

He played college basketball at the University of Tennessee at Chattanooga, and averaged 15.2 points, 9.7 rebounds, and 3.0 blocks during his last year.

== Professional career ==
=== Barangay Ginebra San Miguel ===
Barangay Ginebra San Miguel acquired Mason as an import to play for the 2014 PBA Governors' Cup. Coach Jeffrey Cariaso acquired him for defensive purposes. In the tune-up game before the start of the conference, Mason scored 22 points to help the team win against the San Miguel Beermen.

In his debut game on the 2014 PBA Governors' Cup, he tallied 21 points, 15 rebounds, and four assists in the team's win.

In his second game on the 2014 PBA Governors' Cup, the team won again, and Mason finished with 32 points and 19 rebounds against the Meralco Bolts. In his third game, against the Air21 Express, he tallied 22 points, 9 rebounds, and 5 assists; after this win, the team was the only undefeated team remaining.

=== Hyères-Toulon Var Basket ===
On August 1, 2014, Mason signed with Hyères-Toulon Var Basket of LNB Pro B in France.
