= 2013–14 GlobalPort Batang Pier season =

Season of a Philippine basketball franchise

- Head coach: Richie Ticzon (Philippine Cup); Pido Jarencio (Commissioner's and Governors' Cups)
- General manager: Benedict Manalo
- Owners: Sultan 900 Capital, Inc.

Philippine Cup results
- Record: 5–9 (35.7%)
- Place: 7th
- Playoff finish: Quarterfinals (Def. by Rain or Shine 1–0 twice to beat)

Commissioner's Cup results
- Record: 1–8 (11.1%)
- Place: 10th
- Playoff finish: Did not qualify

Governors' Cup results
- Record: 1–8 (11.1%)
- Place: 10th
- Playoff finish: Did not qualify

GlobalPort Batang Pier seasons

The 2013–14 GlobalPort Batang Pier season was the 2nd season of the franchise in the Philippine Basketball Association (PBA).

== Key dates ==
- November 3: The 2013 PBA Draft took place in Midtown Atrium, Robinson Place Manila.
- November 9: Junel Baculi is replaced by Richie Ticzon as head coach of the GlobalPort Batang Pier.
- January 29: Richie Ticzon is replaced by Pido Jarencio as head coach.

== Draft picks ==
Round	Pick	Player	Position	Nationality	PBA D-League team	College
1	5	Terrence Romeo	PG	Philippines	Big Chill Super Chargers	Far Eastern
1	6	RR Garcia	PG	Philippines	NLEX Road Warriors	Far Eastern
1	7	Isaac Holstein	C	United States	Black Water Sports	West Virginia
2	1	Nico Salva	SF	Philippines	NLEX Road Warriors	Ateneo
3	2	Jopher Custodio	SG	Philippines	Jumbo Plastic Linoleum Giants	MLQU
3	4	LA Revilla		Philippines		De La Salle

== Roster ==
2013–14 GlobalPort Batang Pier roster
Players
Coaches

Pos.	#	POB	Name	Height	Weight	DOB (YYYY–MM–DD)	From
G	4	(Philippines)	RR Garcia (R)	5 ft 9 in (1.75 m)	160 lb (73 kg)		Far Eastern
F/C	5	(Philippines)	Jondan Salvador	6 ft 4 in (1.93 m)	210 lb (95 kg)		St. Benilde
G	7	(Philippines)	Terrence Romeo (R)	5 ft 9 in (1.75 m)	178 lb (81 kg)		Far Eastern
G	8	(Philippines)	Ronjay Buenafe	6 ft 0.5 in (1.84 m)	200 lb (91 kg)	1983-05-25	Emilio Aguinaldo
PG	10	(Philippines)	Alex Cabagnot	6 ft 0 in (1.83 m)	175 lb (79 kg)		Hawaiʻi–Hilo
F	11	(Philippines)	Jay Washington	6 ft 7 in (2.01 m)	220 lb (100 kg)		Eckerd
G/F	12	(Philippines)	Marvin Hayes	6 ft 2 in (1.88 m)	190 lb (86 kg)		José Rizal
C	15	(Philippines)	Jewel Ponferada	6 ft 5 in (1.96 m)	210 lb (95 kg)		National-U
F/C	23	(Philippines)	Kelly Nabong	6 ft 7 in (2.01 m)	220 lb (100 kg)		SRJC
SF	28	(Philippines)	Mark Yee	6 ft 3 in (1.91 m)	170 lb (77 kg)		San Sebastian (Cavite)
C	30	(United States)	Eric Menk (C)	6 ft 6 in (1.98 m)	220 lb (100 kg)		Lake Superior State
SF	33	(Philippines)	Val Acuña	6 ft 4 in (1.93 m)	179 lb (81 kg)	1986-11-24	UE
F/C	34	(Philippines)	Sharma, Carlo	6 ft 6 in (1.98 m)	220 lb (100 kg)	1980-09-20	De La Salle
SG	80	(Philippines)	Mark Macapagal	6 ft 2 in (1.88 m)	185 lb (84 kg)		San Sebastian
C	95	(Philippines)	Yancy De Ocampo	6 ft 9 in (2.06 m)	220 lb (100 kg)	1980-3-11	Saint Francis of Assisi

Head coach

- (Philippines) Alfredo Jarencio (UST)

Assistant coach(es)

- (Philippines) Glenn Capacio (Far Eastern)
- (Philippines) Rommel Adducul (San Sebastian)
- (Philippines) Seren Dueñas
- (Philippines) Ronald Cuan (De La Salle)
- (Philippines) Bonnie Tan
- (Philippines) Alvin Grey
- (Philippines) Johnedel Cardel

Team manager

- (Philippines) Benedict Manalo

Legend

- (C) Team captain
- (CI) Commissioner's Cup Import
- (GI) Governors' Cup Import
- (EI) EASL Import
- (DP) Unsigned draft pick
- (FA) Free agent
- (IN) Inactive
- (S) Suspended
- (R) Rookie
- Injured

== Philippine Cup ==
=== Eliminations ===
==== Standings ====
Pos	Team	W	L	PCT	GB	Qualification
1	Barangay Ginebra San Miguel	11	3	.786 (Note: Head-to-head record: Barangay Ginebra 1–0 Rain or Shine)	—	Twice-to-beat in the quarterfinals
2	Rain or Shine Elasto Painters	11	3	.786	—	Twice-to-beat in the quarterfinals
3	Petron Blaze Boosters	10	4	.714	1	Best-of-three quarterfinals
4	Talk 'N Text Tropang Texters	8	6	.571	3	Best-of-three quarterfinals
5	San Mig Super Coffee Mixers	7	7	.500	4	Best-of-three quarterfinals
6	Barako Bull Energy	5	9	.357 (Note: Head-to-head quotient: Barako Bull 1.06, GlobalPort 1.01, Alaska 0.99, Meralco 0.95; eighth seed playoff: Alaska 94–91 Meralco)	6	Best-of-three quarterfinals
7	GlobalPort Batang Pier	5	9	.357	6	Twice-to-win in the quarterfinals
8	Alaska Aces	5	9	.357	6	Twice-to-win in the quarterfinals
9	Meralco Bolts	5	9	.357	6	
10	Air21 Express	3	11	.214	8	

Source: PBA.ph

== Commissioner's Cup ==
=== Eliminations ===
==== Standings ====
Pos	Team	W	L	PCT	GB	Qualification
1	Talk 'N Text Tropang Texters	9	0	1.000	—	Twice-to-beat in the quarterfinals
2	San Miguel Beermen	7	2	.778	2	Twice-to-beat in the quarterfinals
3	Alaska Aces	6	3	.667	3	Best-of-three quarterfinals
4	Rain or Shine Elasto Painters	5	4	.556 (Note: Head-to-head record: Rain or Shine 1–0 Meralco)	4	Best-of-three quarterfinals
5	Meralco Bolts	5	4	.556	4	Best-of-three quarterfinals
6	San Mig Super Coffee Mixers	4	5	.444	5	Best-of-three quarterfinals
7	Air21 Express	3	6	.333 (Note: Head-to-head record: Air21 1–0 Barangay Ginebra)	6	Twice-to-win in the quarterfinals
8	Barangay Ginebra San Miguel	3	6	.333	6	Twice-to-win in the quarterfinals
9	Barako Bull Energy	2	7	.222	7	
10	GlobalPort Batang Pier	1	8	.111	8	

Source: PBA.ph

== Governors' Cup ==
=== Eliminations ===
==== Standings ====
Pos	Team	W	L	PCT	GB	Qualification
1	Talk 'N Text Tropang Texters	7	2	.778	—	Twice-to-beat in the quarterfinals
2	Rain or Shine Elasto Painters	6	3	.667	1	Twice-to-beat in the quarterfinals
3	Alaska Aces	5	4	.556 (Note: Head-to-head quotient: Alaska 1.08, San Mig 1.02, San Miguel 0.99, Barangay Ginebra 0.97, Air21 0.94)	2	Twice-to-beat in the quarterfinals
4	San Mig Super Coffee Mixers	5	4	.556	2	Twice-to-beat in the quarterfinals
5	Petron Blaze Boosters	5	4	.556	2	Twice-to-win in the quarterfinals
6	Barangay Ginebra San Miguel	5	4	.556	2	Twice-to-win in the quarterfinals
7	Air21 Express	5	4	.556	2	Twice-to-win in the quarterfinals
8	Barako Bull Energy	3	6	.333 (Note: Head-to-head record: Barako Bull 95–94 Meralco)	4	Twice-to-win in the quarterfinals
9	Meralco Bolts	3	6	.333	4	
10	GlobalPort Batang Pier	1	8	.111	6	

Source: PBA.ph

== Transactions ==
=== Trades ===
==== Pre-season ====
October 30, 2013	To GlobalPort Dennis Miranda	To Petron Blaze Chris Ross

=== Recruited imports ===
Tournament	Name	Debuted	Last game	Record
Commissioner's Cup	Evan Brock	March 5 (vs. Air21)	April 13 (vs. Barako Bull)	1–8
Governors' Cup	LeRoy Hickerson	May 20 (vs. Barangay Ginebra)	May 25 (vs. Rain or Shine)	1–2
Governors' Cup	Dior Lowhorn	May 30 (vs. San Mig Super Coffee)	June 14 (vs. Meralco)	0–6
