= 2014 PBA Governors' Cup finals =

Basketball tournament

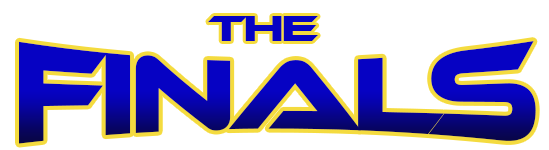
Team	Coach	Wins
(4) San Mig Super Coffee Mixers	Tim Cone	3
(2) Rain or Shine Elasto Painters	Yeng Guiao	2
- Dates: July 1–9, 2014
- MVP: James Yap (San Mig Super Coffee)
- Television: Local: Sports5; TV5; AksyonTV; Cignal PPV (HD); International: Fox Sports Asia; AksyonTV International
- Announcers: See broadcast notes
- Radio network: DZSR and DWFM

Referees
- Game 1: J. Mariano, E. Tankion, J. Cabiles
- Game 2: A. Herrera, E. Aquino, R. Yante
- Game 3: P. Balao, R. Gruta, B. Oliva
- Game 4: N. Quilingen, S. Pineda, R. Dacanay
- Game 5: A. Herrera, N. Guevarra, E. Tankion

PBA Governors' Cup finals chronology
- < 2013 2015 >

PBA finals chronology
- < 2014 Commissioner's 2014–15 Philippine >

The 2014 Philippine Basketball Association (PBA) Governors' Cup finals was the best-of-5 championship series of the 2014 PBA Governors' Cup and the conclusion of the conference's playoffs. The San Mig Super Coffee Mixers and the Rain or Shine Elasto Painters competed for the 14th Governors' Cup championship and the 112th overall championship contested by the league. The format was shortened to a best-of-5 format instead of the usual best-of-7 due to changes in the season calendar to accommodate Gilas Pilipinas's participation in the 2014 FIBA Basketball World Cup and the 2014 Asian Games.

The Coffee Mixers became the fourth team in the league's history, and the first one since 1996, to win all of the conference titles in a season, also known as the Grand Slam, after defeating the Elasto Painters, three games to two. They also won their fourth straight PBA title, which was last done by the Alaska Milkmen (who also won the latest Grand Slam) from 1995 to 1996.

== Background ==
=== San Mig Super Coffee Mixers ===
San Mig Super Coffee finished the elimination round with a 5–4 record and tied with Alaska, San Miguel, Barangay Ginebra and Air21 in third place. Due to the quotient system imposed for tiebreakers this conference, the Coffee Mixers ended up in fourth place, having the second superior quotient among the five teams. The team then defeated fifth seeded San Miguel Beermen in the quarterfinals in one game (SMC has a twice to beat advantage), 97–90. San Mig Coffee advanced to the semifinal round and was matched up against their Commissioner's Cup finals opponent, the Talk 'N Text Tropang Texters. San Mig Coffee was able to win the first two games of their best-of-five series, giving them an edge to close out the series and sweep out Talk 'N Text. However, the Tropang Texters were able to win games 3 and 4, forcing a deciding Game 5. The rubber match was very close and no team led their opponent by more than six points in the first three quarters. In the fourth quarter, the free throw shooting woes and missed attempts in the painted area of Talk 'N Text became costly as San Mig Coffee was able to break away with the lead and the win to clinch the first finals berth.

=== Rain or Shine Elasto Painters ===
The Elasto Painters struggled in the earlier part of the tournament, ending up with a 1–3 record in their first four games. They won all of their remaining games, including a 51-point win against Alaska last June 4. After the eliminations, they ended up with the second seed going to the quarterfinals and was pitted against the Air21. They took advantage of their twice-to-win incentive and defeated the Express in one game, 111–90. In the semifinals, they went up against Alaska. Both teams had alternating wins in the series, with Alaska winning games one and three, while the Elasto Painters won games two and four. Rain or Shine eventually won the deciding game five of their series, and set a rematch against San Mig Coffee.

=== Road to the finals ===
San Mig Super Coffee		Rain or Shine
Finished 5–4 (0.556): 4th place (1.02 diff.)	Elimination round	Finished 6–3 (0.667): 2nd place
Def. San Miguel in 1 game, 97–90	Quarterfinals	Def. Air21 in 1 game, 111–90
Def. Talk 'N Text, 3–2	Semifinals	Def. Alaska, 3–2

=== Head-to-head matchup ===
June 24

recap

San Mig Super Coffee Mixers 94, Rain or Shine Elasto Painters 95

Smart Araneta Coliseum, Quezon City

== Series summary ==
Team	Game 1	Game 2*	Game 3	Game 4	Game 5	Wins
San Mig Coffee	104	87	78	79	92	3
Rain or Shine	101	89	69	88	89	2
Venue	MOA	Araneta	Araneta	Araneta	Araneta

*overtime

=== Game 1 ===
Sports5

July 1
8:00pm

boxscore

San Mig Super Coffee Mixers 104, Rain or Shine Elasto Painters 101
Scoring by quarter: 24–29, 22–28, 25–21, 33–23
Pts: Simon 18; Rebs: Blakely 14; Asts: Pingris 5	Pts: Reid 35; Rebs: Reid 12; Asts: Lee 4
San Mig Super Coffee leads series, 1–0

Mall of Asia Arena, Pasay
Referees: J. Mariano, E. Tankion, J. Cabiles

At the first three quarters, Rain or Shine got the lead many times, even up to seventeen, but the Coffee Mixers bounced back and won this game, 101–104, led by PJ Simon's 18 points.

=== Game 2 ===
Sports5

July 3
8:00pm

boxscore

San Mig Super Coffee Mixers 87, Rain or Shine Elasto Painters 89 (OT)
Scoring by quarter: 24–18, 13–19, 22–29, 21–14, Overtime: 7–9
Pts: Yap 22; Rebs: Blakely 14; Asts: Blakely 8	Pts: Reid 29; Rebs: Reid 17; Asts: Reid, Chan 4
Series tied, 1–1

Smart Araneta Coliseum, Quezon City
Referees: A. Herrera, E. Aquino, R. Yante

=== Game 3 ===
Sports5

July 5
5:00pm

boxscore

San Mig Super Coffee Mixers 78, Rain or Shine Elasto Painters 69
Scoring by quarter: 17–14, 22–16, 19–25, 20–14
Pts: Blakely 17; Rebs: Blakely 17; Asts: Pingris, Melton 4	Pts: Reid 31; Rebs: Reid 8 Asts: Lee 6
San Mig Super Coffee leads series, 2–1

Smart Araneta Coliseum, Quezon City
Attendance: 17,217
Referees: P. Balao, R. Gruta, B. Oliva

=== Game 4 ===
Sports5

July 7
8:00pm

boxscore

San Mig Super Coffee Mixers 79, Rain or Shine Elasto Painters 88
Scoring by quarter: 21–21, 17–32, 17–16, 24–19
Pts: Blakely 21; Rebs: Blakely 16; Asts: Blakely 3	Pts: Reid 22; Rebs: Reid 17; Asts: Lee, Chan 5
Series tied, 2–2

Smart Araneta Coliseum, Quezon City
Attendance: 18,168
Referees: N. Quilingen, S. Pineda, R. Dacanay

=== Game 5 ===
Sports5

July 9
8:00pm

boxscore

San Mig Super Coffee Mixers 92, Rain or Shine Elasto Painters 89
Scoring by quarter: 23–16, 20–22, 30–32, 19–19
Pts: Yap 29; Rebs: Blakely 16; Asts: Blakely 8	Pts: Reid 23; Rebs: Reid 14; Asts: Norwood, Chan 4
San Mig Super Coffee wins series, 3–2

Smart Araneta Coliseum, Quezon City
Attendance: 23,234
Referees: A. Herrera, N. Guevarra, E. Tankion

== Rosters ==
San Mig Super Coffee Mixers roster
Players
Coaches

Pos.	#	POB	Name	Height	Weight	DOB (YYYY–MM–DD)	From
C	00	(Kuwait)	Yousef Taha	6 ft 8 in (2.03 m)	220 lb (100 kg)	1988-07-08	North Lake
G	2	(United States)	Justin Melton (R)	5 ft 10 in (1.78 m)	163 lb (74 kg)	1987-4-27	Mount Olive
C	4	(United States)	Rafi Reavis	6 ft 8 in (2.03 m)	205 lb (93 kg)	1977-7-27	Coppin State
C	5	(United States)	Isaac Holstein (R)	6 ft 8 in (2.03 m)	206 lb (93 kg)	1987-9-7	West Virginia State
SF	6	(Philippines)	JR Cawaling (R, IN)	6 ft 5 in (1.96 m)	190 lb (86 kg)	1987-8-15	Far Eastern
SG	8	(Philippines)	Peter June Simon	6 ft 1 in (1.85 m)	180 lb (82 kg)	1980-6-1	Mindanao
PG	9	(Philippines)	Lester Alvarez (IN)	5 ft 8 in (1.73 m)	154 lb (70 kg)	1988-9-18	Adamson
F/C	10	(Philippines)	Ian Sangalang (R)	6 ft 6 in (1.98 m)	212 lb (96 kg)	1991-12-20	San Sebastian
SG	11	(United States)	Alex Mallari	6 ft 4 in (1.93 m)	167 lb (76 kg)	1987-3-26	Lewis–Clark State
PG	14	(Philippines)	Mark Barroca	5 ft 10 in (1.78 m)	170 lb (77 kg)	1986-4-25	Far Eastern
PF	15	(Philippines)	Marc Pingris	6 ft 5 in (1.96 m)	210 lb (95 kg)	1981-10-16	PSBA
SG	18	(Philippines)	James Yap	6 ft 3 in (1.91 m)	205 lb (93 kg)	1982-2-15	UE
SF	19	(Philippines)	Jerwin Gaco	6 ft 4 in (1.93 m)	180 lb (82 kg)	1981-1-17	De La Salle
G/F	22	(Philippines)	Allein Maliksi	6 ft 3 in (1.91 m)	180 lb (82 kg)	1987-9-18	UST
F	23	(United States)	Marqus Blakely (I)	6 ft 5 in (1.96 m)	225 lb (102 kg)	1988-10-22	Vermont
SF	33	(Philippines)	Ronnie Matias	6 ft 5 in (1.96 m)	184 lb (83 kg)	1983-11-29	Manila
PF	38	(United States)	Joe Devance	6 ft 7 in (2.01 m)	215 lb (98 kg)	1982-2-19	UTEP

Head coach

- (United States) Tim Cone (George Washington)

Assistant coach(es)

- (Philippines) Richard del Rosario (De La Salle)
- (Philippines) Johnny Abarrientos (Far Eastern)
- (Philippines) Jason Webb (De La Salle)
- (Philippines) Mon Jose (De La Salle)

Team manager

- (Philippines) Alvin Patrimonio (Mapúa)

Legend

- (C) Team captain
- (CI) Commissioner's Cup Import
- (GI) Governors' Cup Import
- (EI) EASL Import
- (DP) Unsigned draft pick
- (FA) Free agent
- (IN) Inactive
- (S) Suspended
- (R) Rookie
- Injured

Rain or Shine Elasto Painters roster
Players
Coaches

Pos.	#	POB	Name	Height	Weight	DOB (YYYY–MM–DD)	From
SG	1	(Philippines)	Jonathan Uyloan	6 ft 0 in (1.83 m)	185 lb (84 kg)		Golden West
PG	3	(Philippines)	Paul Lee	6 ft 0 in (1.83 m)	200 lb (91 kg)		UE
SG	5	(United States)	Gabe Norwood	6 ft 5 in (1.96 m)	210 lb (95 kg)		George Mason
SF	6	(Philippines)	Jireh Ibañes (C)	6 ft 1 in (1.85 m)	182 lb (83 kg)		UP Diliman
G	8	(Philippines)	Jeric Teng (R)	6 ft 2 in (1.88 m)	182 lb (83 kg)		UST
G	9	(Philippines)	Alex Nuyles (R)	6 ft 1 in (1.85 m)	199 lb (90 kg)		Adamson
PG	11	(Philippines)	Tyrone Tang	5 ft 7 in (1.70 m)	155 lb (70 kg)		De La Salle
SG	16	(Philippines)	Jeffrei Chan	6 ft 3 in (1.91 m)	170 lb (77 kg)		Far Eastern
PG	17	(Philippines)	Chris Tiu	5 ft 11 in (1.80 m)	175 lb (79 kg)		Ateneo
SG	18	(Philippines)	Ryan Araña	6 ft 1.25 in (1.86 m)	180 lb (82 kg)		De La Salle
C	20	(Philippines)	Jervy Cruz	6 ft 5 in (1.96 m)	220 lb (100 kg)		UST
C	30	(Philippines)	Beau Belga	6 ft 5 in (1.96 m)	285 lb (129 kg)		Philippine Christian
F	32	(United States)	Arizona Reid (I)	6 ft 5 in (1.96 m)	205 lb (93 kg)		High Point
PF	48	(Philippines)	J.R. Quiñahan	6 ft 6 in (1.98 m)	225 lb (102 kg)		Visayas
PF	55	(Philippines)	Larry Rodriguez	6 ft 5 in (1.96 m)	200 lb (91 kg)		PMI
C	57	(Philippines)	Raymond Almazan (R)	6 ft 8 in (2.03 m)	200 lb (91 kg)		Letran

Head coach

- (Philippines) Yeng Guiao (UP Diliman)

Assistant coach(es)

- (Philippines) Caloy Garcia (St. Benilde)
- (Philippines) Mike Buendia
- (Philippines) Jay Legacion
- (Philippines) Matthew Makalintal
- (Philippines) Ricky Umayam

Legend

- (C) Team captain
- (CI) Commissioner's Cup Import
- (GI) Governors' Cup Import
- (EI) EASL Import
- (DP) Unsigned draft pick
- (FA) Free agent
- (IN) Inactive
- (S) Suspended
- (R) Rookie
- Injured

Roster

== Broadcast notes ==
Game	TV5 coverage			Fox Sports coverage	
Game	Play-by-play	Analyst(s)	Courtside reporters	Play-by-play	Analyst(s)
Game 1	Magoo Marjon	Eric Reyes and Luigi Trillo	Erika Padilla	no broadcast	
Game 2	Mico Halili	Quinito Henson and Luigi Trillo	Rizza Diaz	no broadcast	
Game 3	Charlie Cuna	Dominic Uy and Ryan Gregorio	Sel Guevara	Aaron Atayde	Charles Tiu
Game 4	Magoo Marjon	Eric Reyes and Luigi Trillo	Erika Padilla	James Velasquez	Vince Hizon
Game 5	Mico Halili	Quinito Henson and Luigi Trillo	Rizza Diaz	Patricia Bermudez-Hizon	Charles Tiu

- Additional Game 5 crew:
  - Trophy presentation: Nikko Ramos
  - Dugout interviewer: Nikko Ramos
