= 2014 PBA Commissioner's Cup finals =

Basketball tournament in the Philippines

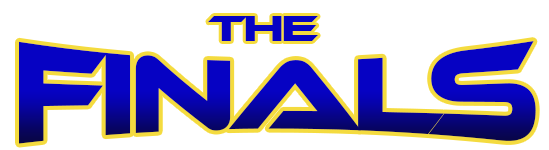
| Team | Coach | Wins |
|---|---|---|
| (6) San Mig Super Coffee Mixers | Tim Cone | 3 |
| (1) Talk 'N Text Tropang Texters | Norman Black | 1 |
- Dates: May 9–15, 2014
- MVP: James Yap (San Mig Super Coffee)
- Television: Sports5; TV5 and AksyonTV; Cignal Digital TV (in high definition) (local); Fox Sports Asia and AksyonTV International (international)
- Announcers: See broadcast notes
- Radio network: DZSR

Referees
- Game 1: P. Balao, J. Mariano, R. Dacanay
- Game 2: N. Quilingen, E. Aquino, A. Tankion
- Game 3: E. Tankion, P. Balao, A. Herrera
- Game 4: A. Herrera, N. Quilingen, J. Mariano

PBA Commissioner's Cup finals chronology
- < 2013 2015 >

PBA finals chronology
- < 2013–14 Philippine 2014 Governors' >

The 2014 Philippine Basketball Association (PBA) Commissioner's Cup finals was the best-of-5 championship series of the 2014 PBA Commissioner's Cup, and the conclusion of the conference's playoffs. The Talk 'N Text Tropang Texters and the San Mig Super Coffee competed for the 14th Commissioner's Cup championship and the 111th overall championship contested by the league. The format was shortened to a best-of-5 format instead of the usual best-of-7 due to changes in the season calendar to accommodate Gilas Pilipinas's participation in the 2014 FIBA Basketball World Cup and the 2014 Asian Games.

This championship was also the first PBA finals series that aired in high-definition television for Cignal Digital TV subscribers.

Prior the finals series, Talk 'N Text had a 13-0 record, sweeping both the elimination (nine games) and playoff (four games) rounds. San Mig Super Coffee however won the championship after defeating Talk 'N Text in their finals series, 3-1.

== Background ==
=== San Mig Super Coffee Mixers ===
San Mig Super Coffee finished 6th place after the elimination round with a 4-5 record. The team was pitted with the defending champions Alaska in a best-of-three quarterfinal series. Alaska won the first game, 86-77 and was on verge of eliminating San Mig Coffee. The Mixers managed to win the next two games to advance to the semifinal round against Air21 Express, an unexpected semifinalist after they had eliminated the second seeded San Miguel Beermen, who had a twice-to-beat advantage.

Led by the 41-year-old Asi Taulava, they won the first game against the Mixers, 103-100. San Mig Coffee went on to win the next two games to grab the series lead and was one win away in clinching a finals berth. However, the Express went on a three-point shooting spree on Game 4, and forced a rubber match. Game 5 was eventually won by the Mixers, 99-83.

=== Talk 'N Text Tropang Texters ===
After being dethroned in the previous conference, Talk 'N Text swept the elimination round, becoming the first team since the 1990 Presto Tivolis to become undefeated in the eliminations, which the Tivolis did in the 1990 PBA All-Filipino Conference. The Tropang Texters gained the top seed and a twice-to-beat advantage against Barangay Ginebra San Miguel. They easily defeated Barangay Ginebra, 97–84, in the quarterfinals and went on to face third seeded Rain or Shine in the semifinals. Talk 'N Text swept Rain or Shine in three games. This achievement gave them a chance to completely sweep the tournament, which was nearly achieved by the 1980 Crispa Redmanizers, who finished 20-1 in the tournament, after they were defeated by the Toyota Super Corollas in Game 3 of the 1980 PBA All-Filipino Conference finals.

=== Road to the finals ===
| San Mig Super Coffee | | Talk 'N Text |
|---|---|---|
| Finished 4–5 (0.444): 6th place | Elimination round | Finished 9–0 (1.000): 1st place |
| Def. Alaska, 2–1 (best-of-three) | Quarterfinals | Def. Barangay Ginebra, 97–84 (twice-to-beat advantage) |
| Def. Air21, 3–2 | Semifinals | Def. Rain or Shine, 3–0 |

=== Head-to-head matchup ===
March 31

recap

Talk 'N Text Tropang Texters 81, San Mig Super Coffee Mixers 75

Smart Araneta Coliseum, Quezon City

== Series summary ==
| Team | Game 1 | Game 2 | Game 3 | Game 4 | Wins |
|---|---|---|---|---|---|
| San Mig Coffee | 95 | 76 | 77 | 100 | 3 |
| Talk 'N Text | 80 | 86 | 75 | 91 | 1 |
| Venue | Araneta | Araneta | Araneta | PhilSports |

=== Game 1 ===
Sports5

May 9
8:00 pm

boxscore

San Mig Super Coffee Mixers 95, Talk 'N Text Tropang Texters 80
Scoring by quarter: 17–17, 27–23, 26–17, 25–23
| Pts: Yap 17; Rebs: Mays 12; Asts: Yap, Barroca, Devance, de Ocampo 3 | Pts: Castro 17; Rebs: Howell 13; Asts: Alapag 4 |
San Mig Super Coffee leads series, 1–0

Smart Araneta Coliseum, Quezon City
Referees: P. Balao, J. Mariano, R. Dacanay

A first half run by the Coffee Mixers helped them gain the lead, and eventually won Game 1, giving Talk 'N Text's first loss in the conference.

=== Game 2 ===
Sports5

May 11
5:00 pm

boxscore

San Mig Super Coffee Mixers 76, Talk 'N Text Tropang Texters 86
Scoring by quarter: 15–19, 18–18, 16–28, 21–27
| Pts: Mays, Melton 15; Rebs: Mays 12; Asts: Devance 3 | Pts: Castro 30; Rebs: Howell 20; Asts: Castro, Alapag 5 |
Series tied, 1–1

Smart Araneta Coliseum, Quezon City
Attendance: 12,829
Referees: N. Quilingen, E. Aquino, A. Tankion

The Texters came back in Game 2 as they took the lead early on and led for most of the game. Near the end of the game, the Mixers, led by their import, James Mays, managed to close in on the Texters, but solid effort on both ends of the floor in the dying minutes helped Talk 'N Text knot the series up, 1-1.

=== Game 3 ===
Sports5

May 13
8:00 pm

boxscore

San Mig Super Coffee Mixers 77, Talk 'N Text Tropang Texters 75
Scoring by quarter: 25–15, 12–20, 23–21, 17–19
| Pts: Mays 20; Rebs: Mays 14; Asts: Mays 4 | Pts: Castro 21; Rebs: Howell 22; Asts: Howell 5 |
San Mig Super Coffee leads series, 2–1

Smart Araneta Coliseum, Quezon City
Attendance: 12,486
Referees: E. Tankion, P. Balao, A. Herrera

Game 3 was different for both squads, as the game went close up to the last minutes of the game. With Jimmy Alapag struggling, the Tropang Texters, led by Jayson Castro and Ranidel De Ocampo, took the lead 75-71. However, James Mays gave the Mixers a fighting chance after he knocked down a shot while drawing contact, getting the Mixers closer 74-75. With a possible 2-1 lead in the series, Talk 'N Text drew up a play that could run out the clock, however, De Ocampo turned the ball over after Jayson Castro failed to catch his low bounce pass. With a chance to win, the Mixers turned to James Yap, who drilled a long 2-point shot near the corner to give the Mixers the lead 76-75. Jayson Castro got open for a game winning three-point shot but his shot missed, handing the Mixers a 2-1 lead and a chance to close the series.

=== Game 4 ===
Sports5

May 15
8:00 pm

boxscore

San Mig Super Coffee Mixers 100, Talk 'N Text Tropang Texters 91
Scoring by quarter: 15–25, 23–27, 31–22, 31–17
| Pts: Barroca 22; Rebs: Mays 15; Asts: Mays 3 | Pts: Alapag 17; Rebs: Howell 12; Asts: Alapag, Ry. Reyes 5 |
San Mig Super Coffee wins series, 3–1

PhilSports Arena, Pasig
Attendance: 10,221
Referees: A. Herrera, N. Quilingen, J. Mariano

In Game 4, Jimmy Alapag lead Tropang Texters to a 17-1 lead in the early minutes of the game. At the half, they led 52-38 after KG Canaleta drilled a three right before the buzzer sounded. A 16-0 run by the Mixers, led by rookie Ian Sangalang gave the Mixers their first lead of the game 69-68 near the end of the 3rd quarter. Jayson Castro and Ranidel De Ocampo knocked down 2 three-point shots to give the Texters the lead back, 74-69. The Texters regained momentum as they took the lead 80-71, just a few minutes into the 4th quarter. The core group of the Mixers, however, helped them rally once again to take the lead 93-89 and held on to win the game, 100-91. The Commissioner's Cup title gave the Mixers their 3rd consecutive championship and a chance to capture a rare season sweep, also known as a Grand Slam, with Marqus Blakely as their import. James Yap was hailed Finals' MVP.

== Rosters ==
San Mig Super Coffee Mixers roster
Players
Coaches

| Pos. | # | POB | Name | Height | Weight | DOB (YYYY–MM–DD) | From |
|---|---|---|---|---|---|---|---|
| G | 2 | (United States) | Justin Melton (R) | 5 ft 10 in (1.78 m) | 163 lb (74 kg) | | Mount Olive |
| C | 4 | (United States) | Rafi Reavis | 6 ft 8 in (2.03 m) | 205 lb (93 kg) | | Coppin State |
| C | 5 | (United States) | Isaac Holstein (R) | 6 ft 8 in (2.03 m) | 206 lb (93 kg) | | West Virginia State |
| SF | 6 | (Philippines) | JR Cawaling (R) | 6 ft 1.75 in (1.87 m) | 190 lb (86 kg) | | Far Eastern |
| SG | 8 | (Philippines) | Peter June Simon | 6 ft 1 in (1.85 m) | 180 lb (82 kg) | | Mindanao |
| PG | 9 | (Philippines) | Lester Alvarez (IN) | 5 ft 8 in (1.73 m) | 154 lb (70 kg) | | Adamson |
| F/C | 10 | (Philippines) | Ian Sangalang (R) | 6 ft 6 in (1.98 m) | 212 lb (96 kg) | | San Sebastian |
| SG | 11 | (United States) | Alex Mallari | 6 ft 4 in (1.93 m) | 167 lb (76 kg) | | Lewis–Clark State |
| PG | 14 | (Philippines) | Mark Barroca | 5 ft 10 in (1.78 m) | 170 lb (77 kg) | | Far Eastern |
| PF | 15 | (Philippines) | Marc Pingris | 6 ft 5 in (1.96 m) | 210 lb (95 kg) | | PSBA |
| SG | 18 | (Philippines) | James Yap | 6 ft 3 in (1.91 m) | 205 lb (93 kg) | | UE |
| SF | 19 | (Philippines) | Jerwin Gaco | 6 ft 4 in (1.93 m) | 180 lb (82 kg) | | De La Salle |
| G/F | 22 | (Philippines) | Allein Maliksi (injured) | 6 ft 3 in (1.91 m) | 180 lb (82 kg) | | UST |
| SF | 33 | (Philippines) | Val Acuña | 6 ft 4 in (1.93 m) | 179 lb (81 kg) | | UE |
| PF | 38 | (United States) | Joe Devance | 6 ft 7 in (2.01 m) | 215 lb (98 kg) | | UTEP |
| F | 40 | (United States) | James Mays (I) | 6 ft 9 in (2.06 m) | 240 lb (109 kg) | | Clemson |
| C | 95 | (Philippines) | Yancy de Ocampo | 6 ft 9 in (2.06 m) | 220 lb (100 kg) | | Saint Francis of Assisi |

Head coach

- (United States) Tim Cone (George Washington)

Assistant coach(es)

- (United States) Jeffrey Cariaso (Sonoma State)
- (Philippines) Richard del Rosario (De La Salle)
- (Philippines) Olsen Racela (Ateneo)
- (Philippines) Johnny Abarrientos (Far Eastern)

Team manager

- (Philippines) Alvin Patrimonio (Mapúa)

Legend

- (C) Team captain
- (CI) Commissioner's Cup Import
- (GI) Governors' Cup Import
- (EI) EASL Import
- (DP) Unsigned draft pick
- (FA) Free agent
- (IN) Inactive
- (S) Suspended
- (R) Rookie
- Injured

Talk 'N Text Tropang Texters roster
Players
Coaches

| Pos. | # | POB | Name | Height | Weight | DOB (YYYY–MM–DD) | From |
|---|---|---|---|---|---|---|---|
| C | 1 | (United States) | Richard Howell (I) | 6 ft 8 in (2.03 m) | 250 lb (113 kg) | 1990-09-26 | NC State |
| PG | 3 | (United States) | Jimmy Alapag (C) | 5 ft 8 in (1.73 m) | 160 lb (73 kg) | 1977-12-30 | Cal State San Bernardino |
| PF | 4 | (United States) | Harvey Carey | 6 ft 2 in (1.88 m) | 210 lb (95 kg) | 1979-03-18 | Sonoma State |
| PG | 5 | (Philippines) | Jai Reyes | 5 ft 9 in (1.75 m) | 150 lb (68 kg) | 1987-02-25 | Ateneo |
| F | 7 | (Philippines) | Nonoy Baclao | 6 ft 6 in (1.98 m) | 210 lb (95 kg) | 1987-06-15 | Ateneo |
| F | 8 | (Philippines) | Robby Celiz (R) | 6 ft 2 in (1.88 m) | 217 lb (98 kg) | 1988-09-07 | National-U |
| F | 9 | (Philippines) | Niño Canaleta | 6 ft 5 in (1.96 m) | 210 lb (95 kg) | 1982-02-12 | UE |
| C/G | 10 | (United States) | Ryan Reyes | 6 ft 1 in (1.85 m) | 190 lb (86 kg) | 1983-08-10 | Cal State Fullerton |
| PG | 11 | (Philippines) | Eric Salamat | 5 ft 10 in (1.78 m) | 190 lb (86 kg) | 1988-04-26 | San Sebastian |
| G/F | 12 | (Philippines) | Larry Fonacier | 6 ft 2 in (1.88 m) | 170 lb (77 kg) | 1982-05-13 | Ateneo |
| C/G | 17 | (Philippines) | Jayson Castro | 5 ft 10 in (1.78 m) | 167 lb (76 kg) | 1986-06-30 | Philippine Christian |
| F | 21 | (United States) | Kelly Williams | 6 ft 7 in (2.01 m) | 215 lb (98 kg) | 1982-02-07 | Oakland |
| F/C | 24 | (United States) | Robert Reyes | 6 ft 6 in (1.98 m) | 215 lb (98 kg) | 1983-03-16 | Flagler |
| F | 33 | (Philippines) | Ranidel De Ocampo | 6 ft 5 in (1.96 m) | 200 lb (91 kg) | 1981-12-08 | Saint Francis of Assisi |
| F | 42 | (United States) | Danny Seigle | 6 ft 6 in (1.98 m) | 215 lb (98 kg) | 1976-06-14 | Wagner |
| G/F | 51 | (Philippines) | Aaron Aban | 6 ft 3 in (1.91 m) | 200 lb (91 kg) | 1982-04-08 | Letran |

Head coach

- (United States) Norman Black (Saint Joseph's)

Assistant coach(es)

- (Philippines) Alexander Arespacochaga (Ateneo)
- (Philippines) Gene Afable (Ateneo)
- (Philippines) Jong Uichico (De La Salle)
- (Philippines) Jamike Jarin
- (Philippines) Joshua Reyes

Team manager

- (Philippines) Aboy Castro

Legend

- (C) Team captain
- (CI) Commissioner's Cup Import
- (GI) Governors' Cup Import
- (EI) EASL Import
- (DP) Unsigned draft pick
- (FA) Free agent
- (IN) Inactive
- (S) Suspended
- (R) Rookie
- Injured

== Broadcast notes ==
| Game | TV5 coverage | | | Fox Sports coverage | |
| Game | Play-by-play | Analyst(s) | Courtside reporters | Play-by-play | Analyst(s) |
|---|---|---|---|---|---|
| Game 1 | Magoo Marjon | Quinito Henson | Rizza Diaz | Mico Halili | Vince Hizon |
| Game 2 | Mico Halili | Jason Webb | Apple David | Chiqui Reyes | Vince Hizon |
| Game 3 | Charlie Cuna | Dominic Uy | Erika Padilla | Chiqui Reyes | Charles Tiu |
| Game 4 | Magoo Marjon | Quinito Henson | Sel Guevara | Aaron Atayde | Charles Tiu |

- Additional Game 4 crew:
  - Trophy presentation: James Velasquez
  - Dugout interviewer: Sel Guevara (only shown on the Cignal HD coverage)
