= 2014–15 PBA Philippine Cup =

2014-15 conference in the Philippine Basketball Association

- Duration: October 19, 2014 – January 21, 2015
- TV partner(s): Local: Sports5; TV5; AksyonTV; Fox Sports; International: AksyonTV International

Finals
- Champions: San Miguel Beermen
- Runners-up: Alaska Aces

Awards
- Best Player: June Mar Fajardo (San Miguel Beermen)
- Finals MVP: Arwind Santos (San Miguel Beermen)

PBA Philippine Cup chronology
- < 2013–14 2015–16 >

PBA conference chronology
- < 2014 Governors' 2015 Commissioner's >

The 2014–15 Philippine Basketball Association (PBA) Philippine Cup was the first conference of the 2014–15 PBA season. The tournament began on October 19, 2014, and ended on January 21, 2015. The tournament does not allow teams to hire foreign players or imports.

== Format ==
The following format was observed for the duration of the conference:

- Single-round robin eliminations; 11 games per team; Teams are then seeded by basis on win–loss records. Ties are broken among head-to-head records of the tied teams.
- The top two teams after the elimination round will automatically advance to the semifinals.
- The next eight teams will play in a double-phase quarterfinal round. The #3 to #6 seed will have twice-to-beat advantage against their opponent. Phase 1 matchups are:
  - QF1: #3 team vs. #10 team
  - QF2: #4 team vs. #9 team
  - QF3: #5 team vs. #8 team
  - QF4: #6 team vs. #7 team
- The winners of Phase 1 will advance to the knockout phase. The match ups are:
  - KO1: QF1 vs. QF4
  - KO2: QF2 vs. QF3
- The winners of the quarterfinals will challenge the top two teams in a best-of-seven semifinals series. Match ups are:
  - SF1: #1 vs. KO2
  - SF2: #2 vs. KO1
- The winners in the semifinals advance to the best of seven finals.

== Elimination round ==
=== Team standings ===
| Pos | Team | W | L | PCT | GB | Qualification |
|---|---|---|---|---|---|---|
| 1 | San Miguel Beermen | 9 | 2 | .818 (Note: Head-to-head record: San Miguel 1–0 Rain or Shine) | — | Advance to semifinals |
| 2 | Rain or Shine Elasto Painters | 9 | 2 | .818 | — | Advance to semifinals |
| 3 | Alaska Aces | 8 | 3 | .727 (Note: Head-to-head record: Alaska 1–0 Talk 'N Text) | 1 | Twice-to-beat in the quarterfinals |
| 4 | Talk 'N Text Tropang Texters | 8 | 3 | .727 | 1 | Twice-to-beat in the quarterfinals |
| 5 | Barangay Ginebra San Miguel | 6 | 5 | .545 (Note: Head-to-head quotient: Barangay Ginebra 1.07, Meralco 1.06, Purefoods Star 0.89) | 3 | Twice-to-beat in the quarterfinals |
| 6 | Meralco Bolts | 6 | 5 | .545 | 3 | Twice-to-beat in the quarterfinals |
| 7 | Purefoods Star Hotshots | 6 | 5 | .545 | 3 | Twice-to-win in the quarterfinals |
| 8 | GlobalPort Batang Pier | 5 | 6 | .455 | 4 | Twice-to-win in the quarterfinals |
| 9 | Barako Bull Energy | 4 | 7 | .364 (Note: Head-to-head record: Barako Bull 1–0 NLEX) | 5 | Twice-to-win in the quarterfinals |
| 10 | NLEX Road Warriors | 4 | 7 | .364 | 5 | Twice-to-win in the quarterfinals |
| 11 | Kia Sorento | 1 | 10 | .091 | 8 | |
| 12 | Blackwater Elite | 0 | 11 | .000 | 9 | |

Source: PBA.ph

=== Schedule ===
| Team ╲ Game | 1 | 2 | 3 | 4 | 5 | 6 | 7 | 8 | 9 | 10 | 11 |
|---|---|---|---|---|---|---|---|---|---|---|---|
| Alaska | PF | TNT | MER | SMB | KIA | BW | BBE | GP | NLEX | BGSM | ROS |
| Barako Bull | MER | GP | SMB | ROS | BGSM | KIA | ALA | TNT | BW | NLEX | PF |
| Barangay Ginebra | TNT | KIA | NLEX | BW | PF | BBE | SMB | MER | GP | ALA | ROS |
| Blackwater | KIA | ROS | MER | BGSM | GP | ALA | PF | NLEX | BBE | TNT | SMB |
| GlobalPort | NLEX | BBE | PF | KIA | BW | ROS | TNT | ALA | SMB | BGSM | MER |
| Kia | BW | BGSM | ROS | GP | TNT | ALA | BBE | SMB | PF | MER | NLEX |
| Meralco | BBE | BW | ALA | NLEX | TNT | ROS | BGSM | PF | SMB | KIA | GP |
| NLEX | GP | TNT | BGSM | MER | SMB | PF | BW | ROS | ALA | BBE | KIA |
| Purefoods Star | ALA | SMB | GP | BGSM | NLEX | BW | MER | KIA | ROS | TNT | BBE |
| Rain or Shine | SMB | BW | KIA | TNT | BBE | GP | MER | NLEX | PF | ALA | BGSM |
| San Miguel | ROS | PF | BBE | ALA | NLEX | BGSM | KIA | GP | MER | TNT | BW |
| Talk 'N Text | BGSM | NLEX | ALA | ROS | KIA | MER | GP | BBE | BW | PF | SMB |

= Win; = OT win; = Loss; = OT loss

=== Results ===
| Team | ALA | BBE | BGSM | BW | GP | Kia | MER | NLEX | PF | ROS | SMB | TNT |
|---|---|---|---|---|---|---|---|---|---|---|---|---|
| Alaska | | 78–85 | 92–101 | 69–56 | 87–84 | 85–75 | 105–64 | 90–84 | 93–73 | 95–98 | 66–63 | 100–98 |
| Barako Bull | — | | 75–94 | 92–87 | 81–91 | 87–71 | 108–112** | 92–87 | 83–99 | 71–99 | 89–103 | 106–122 |
| Barangay Ginebra | — | — | | 100–91 | 77–98 | 87–55 | 99–109 | 81–97 | 89–66 | 90–100 | 77–79 | 101–81 |
| Blackwater | — | — | — | | 72–87 | 66–80 | 75–83* | 84–104 | 82–90 | 75–82 | 61–92 | 90–80 |
| GlobalPort | — | — | — | — | | 84–79 | 70–82 | 96–101 | 75–81 | 83–86 | 69–95 | 105–97 |
| Kia | — | — | — | — | — | | 93–99 | 80–88 | 77–88 | 88–117 | 74–90 | 62–85 |
| Meralco | — | — | — | — | — | — | | 90–75 | 74–77 | 79–107 | 77–88 | 72–80 |
| NLEX | — | — | — | — | — | — | — | | 76–92 | 93–95 | 76–79 | 81–103 |
| Purefoods Star | — | — | — | — | — | — | — | — | | 74–83 | 80–87 | 96–100* |
| Rain or Shine | — | — | — | — | — | — | — | — | — | | 79–87 | 76–99 |
| San Miguel | — | — | — | — | — | — | — | — | — | — | | 101–107 |
| Talk 'N Text | — | — | — | — | — | — | — | — | — | — | — | |

Legend: Blue = left column team win; Red = top row team win.
Matches with lighter background shading were decided after overtime.

== Bracket ==
Quarterfinals (1st phase) (Higher seeds twice-to-beat)
3 | Alaska | 82
10 | NLEX | 78
6 | Meralco | 77
7 | Purefoods Star | 65
4 | Talk 'N Text | 105
9 | Barako Bull | 76
5 | Barangay Ginebra | 95
8 | GlobalPort | 78

Quarterfinals (2nd phase) (Single elimination)
3 | Alaska | 87
6 | Meralco | 69
4 | Talk N Text | 83
5 | Barangay Ginebra | 67

Semifinals (Best-of-7)
2 | Rain or Shine | 2
3 | Alaska | 4
1 | San Miguel | 4
4 | Talk N' Text | 0

Finals (Best-of-7)
3 | Alaska | 3
1 | San Miguel | 4

== Quarterfinals ==
=== First phase ===
In this round, the higher-seeded team in the series has the twice-to-beat advantage.

==== (3) Alaska vs. (10) NLEX ====
December 11

Alaska Aces 82, NLEX Road Warriors 78
Alaska wins series in one game

Cuneta Astrodome, Pasay

==== (4) Talk 'N Text vs. (9) Barako Bull ====
December 12

Talk 'N Text Tropang Texters 105, Barako Bull Energy 76
Talk 'N Text wins series in one game

Ynares Center, Antipolo

==== (5) Barangay Ginebra vs. (8) GlobalPort ====
December 12

Barangay Ginebra San Miguel 95, GlobalPort Batang Pier 78
Barangay Ginebra wins series in one game

Ynares Center, Antipolo

==== (6) Meralco vs. (7) Purefoods Star ====
December 11

Meralco Bolts 77, Purefoods Star Hotshots 65
Meralco wins series in one game

Cuneta Astrodome, Pasay

=== Second phase ===
This is a one-game playoff. The winner advances to the semifinals, while the loser is eliminated.

==== (3) Alaska vs. (6) Meralco ====
December 14

Alaska Aces 87, Meralco Bolts 69

Smart Araneta Coliseum, Quezon City

==== (4) Talk 'N Text vs. (5) Barangay Ginebra ====
December 16

Talk 'N Text Tropang Texters 83, Barangay Ginebra San Miguel 67

Smart Araneta Coliseum, Quezon City

== Semifinals ==
=== (1) San Miguel vs. (4) Talk 'N Text ===
December 19

San Miguel Beermen 109, Talk 'N Text Tropang Texters 86

Mall of Asia Arena, Pasay

December 21

San Miguel Beermen 87, Talk 'N Text Tropang Texters 81

Mall of Asia Arena, Pasay

December 23

San Miguel Beermen 96, Talk 'N Text Tropang Texters 95

Mall of Asia Arena, Pasay

December 26

San Miguel Beermen 100, Talk 'N Text Tropang Texters 87
San Miguel wins series, 4–0

Mall of Asia Arena, Pasay

=== (2) Rain or Shine vs. (3) Alaska ===
December 18

Rain or Shine Elasto Painters 80, Alaska Aces 87

Mall of Asia Arena, Pasay

December 20

Rain or Shine Elasto Painters 102, Alaska Aces 95

Mall of Asia Arena, Pasay

December 22

Rain or Shine Elasto Painters 78, Alaska Aces 94

Mall of Asia Arena, Pasay

December 25

Rain or Shine Elasto Painters 98, Alaska Aces 91

Mall of Asia Arena, Pasay

December 27

Rain or Shine Elasto Painters 88, Alaska Aces 93

Mall of Asia Arena, Pasay

January 4

Rain or Shine Elasto Painters 76, Alaska Aces 79
Alaska wins series, 4–2

Mall of Asia Arena, Pasay

== Finals ==
January 7

San Miguel Beermen 82, Alaska Aces 88 (OT)

Smart Araneta Coliseum, Quezon City

January 9

San Miguel Beermen 100, Alaska Aces 86

Smart Araneta Coliseum, Quezon City

January 11

San Miguel Beermen 70, Alaska Aces 78

Smart Araneta Coliseum, Quezon City

January 14

San Miguel Beermen 88, Alaska Aces 70

Smart Araneta Coliseum, Quezon City

January 16

San Miguel Beermen 93, Alaska Aces 88

Smart Araneta Coliseum, Quezon City

January 18

San Miguel Beermen 76, Alaska Aces 87

Smart Araneta Coliseum, Quezon City

January 21

San Miguel Beermen 80, Alaska Aces 78
San Miguel wins series, 4–3

Smart Araneta Coliseum, Quezon City

== Awards ==
=== Conference ===
- Best Player of the Conference: June Mar Fajardo (San Miguel Beermen)
- Finals MVP: Arwind Santos (San Miguel Beermen)

=== Players of the Week ===
| Week | Player | Ref. |
|---|---|---|
| October 19–26 | Japeth Aguilar (Barangay Ginebra San Miguel) | |
| October 27 – November 3 | Calvin Abueva (Alaska Aces) | |
| November 4–9 | Ronjay Buenafe (GlobalPort Batang Pier) | |
| November 10–16 | June Mar Fajardo (San Miguel Beermen) | |
| November 17–23 | Peter June Simon (Purefoods Star Hotshots) | |
| November 24–30 | Paul Lee (Rain or Shine Elasto Painters) | |
| December 9–14 | Vic Manuel (Alaska Aces) | |
| December 16–21 | Alex Cabagnot (San Miguel Beermen) | |
| December 23–28 | June Mar Fajardo (San Miguel Beermen) | |

== Statistical leaders ==
=== Entire conference ===
| Category | Player | Team | Games played | Totals | Average |
|---|---|---|---|---|---|
| Points per game | June Mar Fajardo | San Miguel Beermen | 22 | 390 | 17.73 |
| Rebounds per game | June Mar Fajardo | San Miguel Beermen | 22 | 285 | 12.95 |
| Assists per game | Stanley Pringle | GlobalPort Batang Pier | 11 | 56 | 5.09 |
| Steals per game | Chico Lanete | Barako Bull Energy Cola | 10 | 20 | 2.00 |
| Blocks per game | June Mar Fajardo | San Miguel Beermen | 22 | 44 | 2.00 |
| Field goal percentage | June Mar Fajardo | San Miguel Beermen | 22 | 140/249 | 56.22% |
| 3-pt field goal percentage | Raul Soyud | NLEX Road Warriors | 2 | 5/8 | 62.50% |
| Free throw percentage | Mark Caguioa | Barangay Ginebra San Miguel | 13 | 17/17 | 100.00% |
| Turnovers per game | Mark Cardona | NLEX Road Warriors | 11 | 44 | 4.00 |
