= June Mar Fajardo =

Filipino basketball player (born 1989)

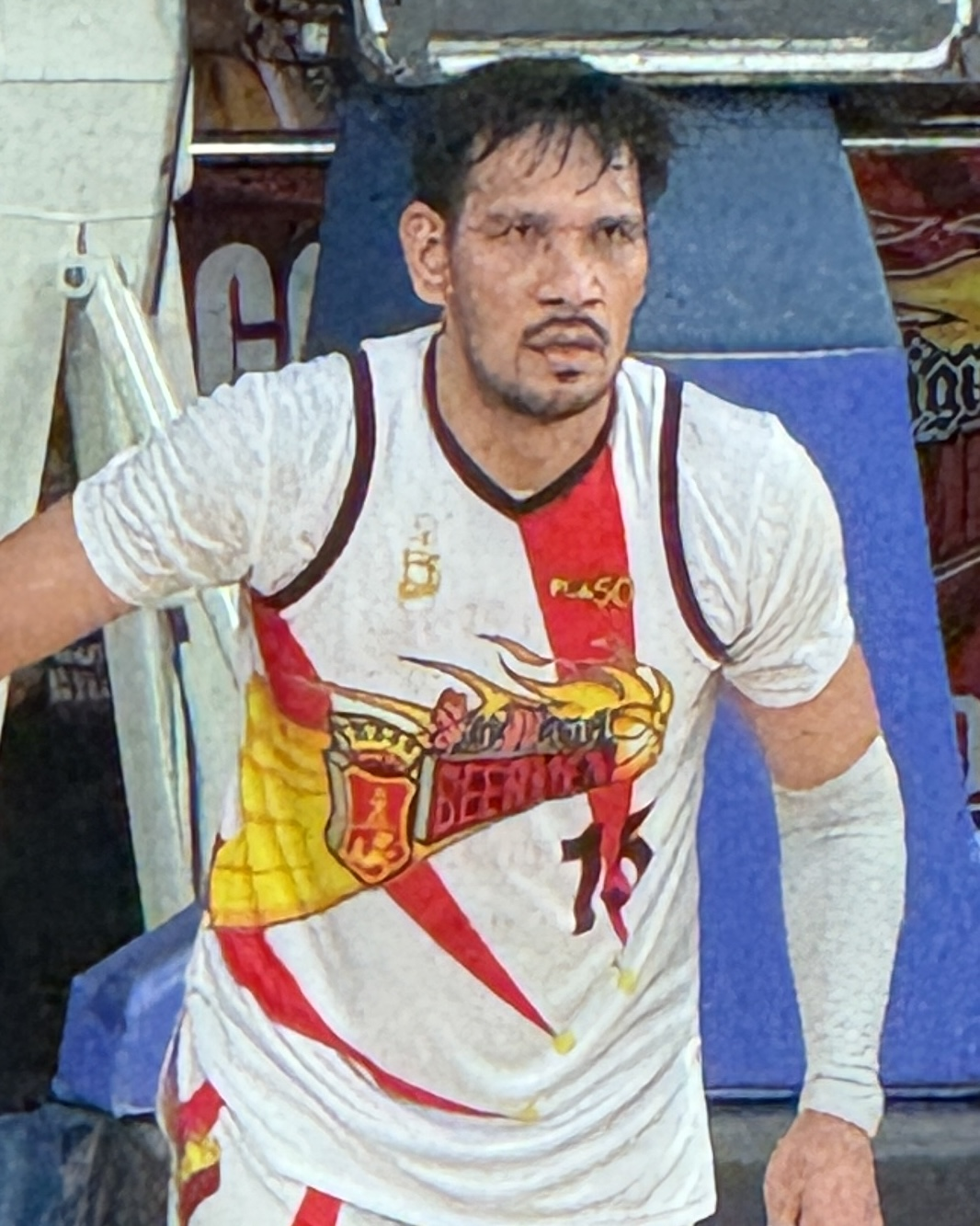
- Fajardo with the San Miguel Beermen in 2026

No. 15 – San Miguel Beermen
- Position: Center
- League: PBA

Personal information
- Born: November 17, 1989 (age 36) Compostela, Cebu, Philippines
- Listed height: 6 ft 11 in (2.11 m)
- Listed weight: 268 lb (122 kg)

Career information
- High school: Pinamungajan National High School (Pinamungajan, Cebu)
- College: UC (2007–2011)
- PBA draft: 2012: 1st round1st overall
- Drafted by: Petron Blaze Boosters
- Playing career: 2011–present

Career history
- 2011–2012: San Miguel Beermen (ABL)
- 2012–present: Petron Blaze Boosters / San Miguel Beermen

Career highlights
- 12× PBA champion (2014–15 Philippine, 2015 Governors', 2015–16 Philippine, 2016–17 Philippine, 2017 Commissioner's, 2017–18 Philippine, 2019 Philippine, 2019 Commissioner's, 2022 Philippine, 2023–24 Commissioner's, 2025 Philippine, 2025–26 Philippine); 5× PBA Finals MVP (2015 Governors', 2017–18 Philippine, 2019 Philippine, 2022 Philippine, 2025–26 Philippine); 9× PBA Most Valuable Player (2014–2019, 2023–2025); 13× PBA Best Player of the Conference (2013–14 Philippine, 2014–15 Philippine, 2015 Governors', 2015–16 Philippine, 2016–17 Philippine, 2017–18 Philippine, 2018 Commissioner's, 2019 Philippine, 2022 Philippine, 2024 Philippine, 2024 Governors', 2025 Philippine, 2025–26 Philippine); 10× PBA All-Star (2013–2019, 2023, 2024, 2026); 10× PBA Mythical First Team (2014–2019, 2021, 2023–2025); PBA Mythical Second Team (2013); PBA Defensive Player of the Year (2015); 8× PBA All-Defensive Team (2014, 2015, 2017–2019, 2023, 2024, 2025); PBA All-Rookie Team (2013); PBA Comeback Player of the Year (2021); 3× PBA Order of Merit (2018, 2019, 2024); 2× PBA Sportsmanship award (2015, 2016); PBA Most Improved Player (2014); 50 Greatest Players in PBA History (2025 selection); National Collegiate Player of the Year (2010); 2× CESAFI champion (2010–2011); 3× CESAFI MVP (2009–2011); 3× CESAFI Mythical team member (2009–2011); 4× PSA awardee for Professional Basketball (2014–2017)

June Mar Sotto Fajardo (Tagalog: [pɐˈhaɾdo]; born November 17, 1989) is a Filipino professional basketball player for the San Miguel Beermen of the Philippine Basketball Association (PBA). He is also known by his nickname "The Kraken" for his extraordinary size and finesse against opposing big men.

Born in Compostela, he transferred with his parents to Pinamungajan at an early age, where he spent most of his younger and teen years. He played center for the University of Cebu Webmasters in the CESAFI and for the San Miguel Beermen in the ASEAN Basketball League before being selected as the first overall in the 2012 PBA draft by Petron Blaze Boosters. Despite his young age, Fajardo showed great potential and has been dubbed by local sports analysts as the Future of Philippine basketball. During his rookie season, he played for the national team and earned a silver medal at the 2013 FIBA Asia Championship for Gilas Pilipinas. In his first year in the PBA, he was selected to the All-Rookie Team and Second Mythical Team. Since then, he became the first person in league history to win the PBA Most Valuable Player award in six consecutive seasons, which he won from 2014 to 2019. After suffering a career-threatening injury in 2020, he won three straight MVPs in 2023 to 2025 to extend his record for the most PBA MVP awards with nine.

He is a perennial member of Gilas Pilipinas in international competitions from 2013 to 2026 and was also part of the team who won the gold medal in the 2022 Asian Games.

== Professional career ==
=== Petron Blaze Boosters / San Miguel Beermen (2012–present) ===
==== Rookie year (2012–13) ====
He made his professional basketball debut in the 2012-13 PBA Philippine Cup in a 102–86 loss against the Rain or Shine Elasto Painters where he finished with nine points and 13 rebounds and made only 5 of his 11 free throws.

Fajardo struggled in the first two conferences of his rookie year, but he was remarkably improved in the third conference. In the semifinals of the 2013 PBA Governors' Cup against Rain or Shine, Fajardo scored 26 points in Game 2 who held up his own against opposing big men Beau Belga and J.R. Quiñahan. Petron went on to defeat the Elasto Painters, 3–1.

He made his PBA Finals debut against the San Mig Super Coffee Mixers in the 2013 PBA Governors' Cup Finals. In Game 4, Fajardo tallied 20 points and 26 rebounds in an 88–86 loss, the first time for a local player to achieve a 20–20 game since Eric Menk. The Boosters eventually lost to the Mixers in seven games.

Fajardo finished second in the Rookie of the Year voting, losing the award to number two overall pick Calvin Abueva. He was selected in the Mythical Second Team along with teammate Alex Cabagnot, Sonny Thoss, Cyrus Baguio and Marc Pingris.

==== Sophomore Year (2013–14) ====
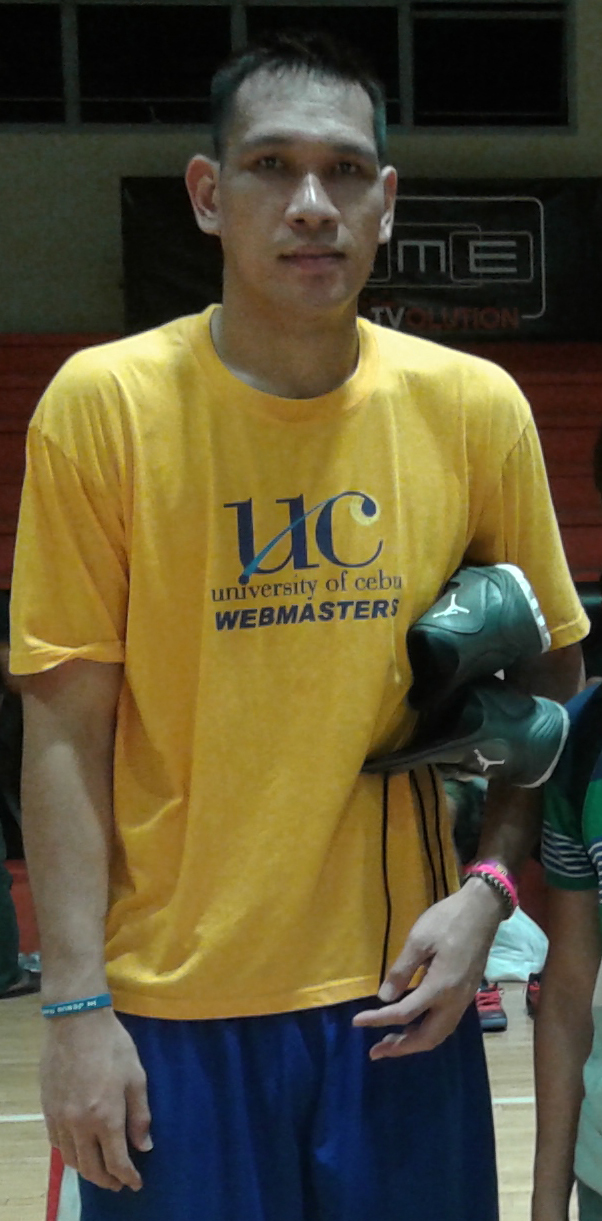
Fajardo in 2014

As expected by many, Fajardo improved significantly by the start of the 2013-14 PBA Philippine Cup. He put together norms of 16.3 points, 14.9 rebounds and 2.5 blocks, winning his first Best Player of the Conference award.

When Petron reverted to San Miguel Beermen, Fajardo changed his jersey number from 22 to 15. The Beermen fell short in the quarterfinals of the Commissioner's Cup after losing to Air21 despite having a twice-to-beat advantage in the series.

In the third conference, Fajardo was a man on a mission. Fajardo scored 26 points and grabbed 27 rebounds, marking his third career 20–20 game with his 27 rebounds two shy of the league record during that time. He led the Best Player of the Conference race with averages of 21.8 points, 16 rebounds, 1.4 assists and 1.4 blocks, but his team lost to eventual champion San Mig Super Coffee in the quarterfinals. As a result of the Beermen eliminated from title contention, Fajardo ended up losing the BPC to Ranidel de Ocampo.

Despite lacking team success in his sophomore season, Fajardo was able to rake several awards in the season-ending Leo Awards. He was the 2014 PBA Most Improved Player and was selected as member of the All-Defensive and Mythical First Team for the first time in his career. In only his second season in the league, he was named the 2014 PBA Most Valuable Player.

==== 2014–15 season ====
Fresh from his first PBA MVP award, Fajardo lorded the 2014-15 PBA Philippine Cup averaging 17.8 points, 12.3 rebounds and 2.0 blocks, including a season-high 36 points and 17 rebounds in a win against Columbian Dyip. He won his second consecutive Philippine Cup Best Player of the Conference award. The Beermen ended the eliminations with a 9–2 record, tied with Rain or Shine Elasto Painters for the first seed, thus earning a first-round bye. They swept TNT in the semifinals in four games before defeating Alaska in seven to win his first-ever PBA championship.

He dominated once again in the third conference, the 2015 PBA Governors' Cup where he won his second Best Player of the Conference award for the season and his first for an import-reinforced conference, averaging 15.6 points, 12.8 rebounds, and 1.4 blocks. The second-seeded Beermen defeated Rain or Shine in five games in the semifinals before asserting their mastery against Alaska by sweeping them in the Finals and win the Governors Cup which marks their 21st title in franchise history. Fajardo won his first Finals MVP along with his second championship with the Beermen.

He went on to win his second consecutive Most Valuable Player award and Defensive Player of the Year for the season, along with a Mythical First Team and All-Defensive team selections and his first ever Samboy Lim Sportsmanship Award.

==== 2015–16 season ====
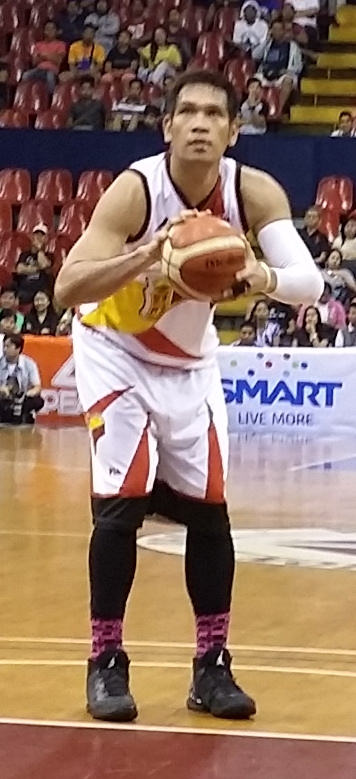
Fajardo in 2015

Fajardo continued his dominance in the following season after winning his first two championships. He secured another Best Player of the Conference award in the 2015-16 PBA Philippine Cup where he averaged 23.1 points, 14.4 rebounds, 1.8 blocks, and 1.6 assists a contest during the elimination round, including a career-high 43 points in a loss against Alaska. Fajardo helped the Beermen finished second seed with a 9–2 record at the end of the elimination round. In the series-clinching win against Rain or Shine in Game 6 of the semifinals, Fajardo went down with a left knee injury which he suffered with seven minutes left in the third quarter on a rebound play against Jireh Ibanes. In Fajardo's absence, many stepped up including players on the bench and managed to squeak a come-from-behind win in Game 4 after being down 0–3 in their Finals rematch against Alaska. Fajardo made a surprise return in Game 5 where he quickly contributed 13 points and 4 rebounds while playing just 16 minutes. With Fajardo's assistance in limited minutes, the Beermen extended the series into a Game 7. San Miguel successfully completed their comeback by winning Game 7 where Fajardo went on to play 29 minutes, which he tallied team-high 21 points and 15 rebounds. The Beermen made history and became the first professional basketball team in the world to come back from an 0–3 series deficit, which was dubbed as the "BEERacle." Fajardo then called his injury a "blessing in disguise."

Fajardo won his third PBA's Most Valuable Player award, tying the record of PBA legend Bogs Adornado. He was the first player to win the award in three consecutive seasons. He was also a member of Mythical First Team and received his second Sportsmanship Award.

==== 2016–17 season ====
In the 2016-17 PBA Philippine Cup, Fajardo was the centerpiece of an almost-perfect campaign in the elimination round after helping the defending champions to secure the top seed with a 10–1 record where he averaged 19.9 points, league-high 16 boards and 1.8 blocks per game, earning himself his fifth overall Best Player of the Conference award and third straight in the season-opening conference. With this feat, Fajardo tied former teammate and mentor Danny Ildefonso as the only players in PBA history with league-high five BPC citations. In the semifinals, the Beermen dispatched rival TNT in seven games before defeating sister team Barangay Ginebra in five games to capture their third straight Philippine Cup title. Fajardo conspired with teammate and former MVP Arwind Santos in the title-clinching win, scoring 21 points each in Game 5 to capture the Perpetual trophy.

With the help of Best Import awardee Charles Rhodes along with Best Player of the Conference Chris Ross, Fajardo aided the Beermen to capture the second seed and eventually win their second consecutive championship of the season by conquering the 2017 PBA Commissioner's Cup after defeating TNT in six games. Fajardo was pivotal in the semifinals against the Star Hotshots where he matched up with opposing import Ricardo Ratliffe. Ratliffe called Fajardo "the best player he've ever played in Asia" after the series where the Beermen defeated the Hotshots, 3–1.

After winning the first two championships of the season, San Miguel had the chance to capture their second Grand Slam which the franchise last won in 1989. At the start of the 2017 PBA Governors' Cup in a win against TNT where he scored 27 points and six rebounds, Fajardo strained his calf muscle and was out for a number of games while also opting out for national team duty in the FIBA Asia Cup. Despite the injury, Fajardo still managed to top the Best Player of the Conference race averaging 18.5 points, 10.6 rebounds, 1.7 assists, and 2.0 blocks. Due to import problems, the Beermen only managed to snag the sixth seed after a costly 101–104 loss against Meralco in the last game of the elimination round, giving them a twice-to-win disadvantage against eventual champions Barangay Ginebra which thwarted their Grand Slam bid in the quarterfinals. As the Beermen was out of title hunt, Fajardo lost the BPC award to rival big man Greg Slaughter despite leading the statistical points.

As a result of his sustained dominance throughout the season, Fajardo copped his fourth Most Valuable Player award in a runaway fashion which tied him with all-time greats Ramon Fernandez and Alvin Patrimonio for league-record four MVP awards. He was the quickest to win his fourth MVP and the only player to receive the award in four consecutive seasons. He was also selected as member of the Mythical First Team and All-Defensive Team.

==== 2017–18 season ====
Fajardo remained unstoppable in the 2017-18 PBA Philippine Cup, averaging league-high 22.8 points along with 13.3 rebounds, 1.8 assists and 2.1 blocks to lead the Beermen to the top seed once again. He shattered record books by extending his reign as the Best Player of the Conference of the Philippine Cup for the fourth consecutive season, his sixth overall which is the most in league history. The Beermen avenged their painful loss against Barangay Ginebra the previous conference which foiled their Grand Slam bid through a gentleman sweep in the semifinals. In the title-clinching game against Magnolia, Fajardo propelled the Beermen to a historic fourth straight Philippine Cup title where he poured a playoff career-high of 42 points and 20 rebounds to help his team overcome a 23-point deficit in the close-out Game 5. He earned the Finals MVP honors, averaging 24.4 points and 16.2 rebounds.

Picking up where he left off last conference, Fajardo won his seventh Best Player of the Conference award in the 2018 PBA Commissioner's Cup, averaging 19.6 points, 11.4 rebounds and 1.6 assists. Despite only finishing sixth after the elimination round, the defending champion Beermen maneuvered their way into the Finals with the help of import Renaldo Balkman to set a date against sister team Barangay Ginebra. The Gin Kings successfully dethroned San Miguel in six games behind resident import Justin Brownlee. This was the Beermen's first Finals loss under head coach Leo Austria.

At the start of the 2018 PBA Governors' Cup, Fajardo suffered a shin injury that sidelined him for two months. He returned deep into the elimination round in a win against Rain or Shine, where the Beermen finished as the sixth seed but eventually lost to twice-to-beat Alaska in the quarterfinals.

Fajardo rewrote history books once again after receiving his fifth straight Most Valuable Player award after winning back-to-back BPCs in the first two conferences despite missing the majority of the Governors' Cup due to injury. He surpassed the league record he shared with Fernandez and Patrimonio last season, making him the record-holder for most career MVPs in the PBA. He once again led the Mythical First Team and received his fourth selection on the All-Defensive Team.

==== 2019 season ====
Following his record fifth MVP, Fajardo played the most games of his career in the 2019 PBA season with 61 games. His superiority in the Philippine Cup continued as he won his league-leading eight Best Player of the Conference award and fifth straight in the All-Filipino conference, norming league-high averages of 21.3 points and 13.9 rebounds per game. He tallied 40 points and 19 rebounds while shooting a near-perfect 14-of-15 from the field in a 113–107 win against Northport, his fourth 40-point game of his career. The Beermen ended the elimination round as the fifth seed with a 7–4 record due to the quotient system. In the semifinals, they defeated the top-seed Phoenix in five games. They went on to defeat Magnolia in the Finals in a grueling seven-game affair, capped off by a come-from-behind win in Game 7 led by Fajardo's 17 points and career-high 31 rebounds (league record for most rebounds by a local) to capture their historic fifth straight Philippine Cup title. Fajardo bagged his third career Finals MVP.

The Beermen was in unfamiliar territory after finishing seventh seed in the 2019 PBA Commissioner's Cup with a 5–6 record as the returning former Best Import Rhodes struggled, which was eventually replaced by Chris McCullough later in the conference. With a new reinforcement, the seventh seed Beermen managed to defeat NorthPort despite having a twice-to-win disadvantage in the quarterfinals. They defeated Rain or Shine in the semifinals before conquering TNT in six games to reclaim the Commissioner's Cup.

In the 2019 PBA Governors' Cup and another Grand Slam conquest at hand, Fajardo led once again in the Best Player of the Conference race with averages of 18.9 points, 13.6 rebounds, 1.9 assists and 1.2 blocks per game. The Beermen's import woes in the season-ending conference continued, closing the elimination round as the fifth seed with a twice-to-win disadvantage once again. Fajardo and company faced a familiar foe in eventual champions Barangay Ginebra which defeated the Beermen in the quarterfinals. Despite leading the BPC race, Fajardo lost the award to former teammate Christian Standhardinger after San Miguel's early exit and another failed Grand Slam bid.

Fajardo stretched his record to an unprecedented six MVPs after winning the league's highest individual award for the sixth consecutive season. He also made another round of Mythical First Team and All-Defensive Team selections.

==== 2020 season ====
Prior to the start of the 2020 PBA season, Fajardo suffered a complete fracture on his right tibia during team practice in February. The injury sidelined him for the season, as well as national team duties. With Fajardo's absence, along with the injury of all-star teammate Terrence Romeo, the defending champion Beermen was eliminated by Meralco in the quarterfinals of the 2020 PBA Philippine Cup, ending their five-year reign.

==== 2021 season ====
Fajardo made a triumphant comeback for the 2021 PBA season after taking a season off due to his injury. Though still struggling and visibly adjusting from basketball play, he still made respectable averages of 13.5 points, 10.8 rebounds, 2.2 assists and 1.1 blocks in the 2021 PBA Philippine Cup which is still good enough for finishing fifth in the Best Player of the Conference race by which he won the previous six times prior to his injury. The Beermen lost in the semifinals against the TNT Tropang Giga in seven games in the semi-bubble held in Don Honorio Ventura State University gymnasium. In the 2021 PBA Governors' Cup, the Beermen finished as the fifth seed and was eliminated by Meralco again in the quarterfinals with a twice-to-win disadvantage. Slowly coming back to form, Fajardo improved his averages in the season-ending conference with 14.3 points, 11.3 rebounds and 1.2 blocks. He finished the season with 13.8 points, 11.0 rebounds, 1.8 assists, 1.1 blocks and 0.4 steals, all career-low averages except for assists since his rookie year. Due to his noteworthy return from injury, he was given the 2021 Bogs Adornado PBA Comeback Player of the Year Award by the PBA Press Corps as well as his seventh Mythical First Team selection.

==== 2022–23 season ====
Back in full form, Fajardo steered the Beermen to the one-seed in the 2022 PBA Philippine Cup with a 9–2 record in the eliminations. He recaptured the Best Player of the Conference award for the record-extending ninth time in his career and seventh in the All-Filipino conference with averages of 18.7 points, league-best 14.2 rebounds, 3.1 assists and 1.3 blocks. After two seasons, the Beermen overcame TNT in seven games to reclaim the Philippine Cup powered by another stellar Finals performance from Fajardo. He went on to win his fourth Finals MVP award with averages of 19.0 points, 16.6 rebounds, 2.7 assists and 1.1 blocks, tying James Yap, LA Tenorio and Danny Seigle for the most in league history.

Fajardo clinched his seventh MVP award, extending his record for the most MVPs in league history. He was also once again honored with selections to the Mythical First Team and All-Defensive Team. Fajardo won his 11th PBA Best Player of the Conference award (989 points) and PHP50,000 from Arena Plus and Pocari Sweat.

== National team career ==
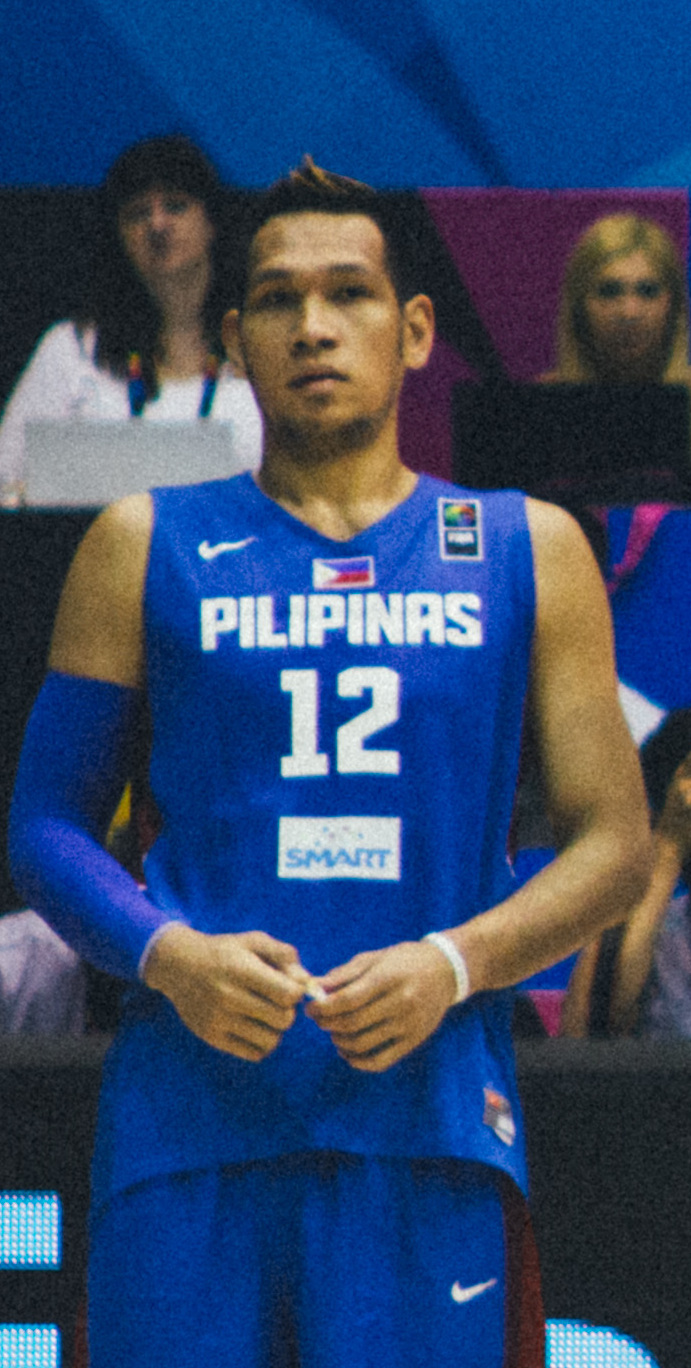
Fajardo during the 2014 World Cup

Fajardo was chosen to be part of the Smart Gilas 2.0 team, later known as Gilas Pilipinas, that was built for the 2014 World Championships. After months of training that includes trips and scrimmages to Lithuania and New Zealand, Fajardo was included in the final 12-man lineup that would compete in the 2013 FIBA Asia Championship, the qualifier for the 2014 World Championships. In his first game in international competition, Fajardo scored 2 points, grabbed 2 rebounds, and was called for 4 personal fouls in less than 9 minutes of action against Saudi Arabia. He then only scored a total of 1 point in his next 6 games. Ultimately, Gilas Pilipinas finished with a silver medal and automatically qualified for next year's World Championships.

When the Gilas Pilipinas prepared for the 2014 FIBA World Cup, he was again called up to be part of the training pool.

He was also part of the Gilas team which played in Wuhan, China for the 5th FIBA Asia Cup where they won the bronze medal. However, he was almost a non factor as he was still adjusting to the international game and style of play. After the FIBA Asia Cup, the Gilas training pool headed to Miami to kick start their long preparations for the 2014 World Cup and the 2014 Asian Games.

During his stint in the 2014 FIBA World Cup, Fajardo was consistent in his limited minutes on the court while providing energy and hustle coming off the bench as a reliever for Blatche. Due to his good performance, he was ranked second among all players in terms of Player Efficiency Rating (PER) behind Spanish NBA player Pau Gasol, and ranked higher than some NBA players in the PER rating. His breakthrough performance came in the team's last game against Senegal where Fajardo played his best game in the entire tournament. Fajardo had 15 points, 9 rebounds, 2 steals and 2 assists as he provided hustle and muscle against the big men of Senegal most especially in the final quarter of regulation and overtime when Blatche was fouled out. In a team effort led by Fajardo and team captain Jimmy Alapag, the Philippines captured their lone win of the tournament and ended their campaign on a winning note.

Fajardo was included in the 21-man pool for the 2023 FIBA World Cup, where he was eventually included in the final 12-man lineup.

== Career statistics ==
=== PBA ===
Legend
GP	Games played	MPG	Minutes per game	FG%	Field-goal percentage
3FG%	3-point field-goal percentage	4P%	4-point field-goal percentage	FT%	Free-throw percentage
RPG	Rebounds per game	APG	Assists per game	SPG	Steals per game
BPG	Blocks per game	PPG	Points per game	127	Career high

As of the end of 2025–26 season

==== Season-by-season averages ====
Year	Team	GP	MPG	FG%	3P%	4P%	FT%	RPG	APG	SPG	BPG	PPG
2012–13	Petron	45	26.9	.564	—	—	.586	9.3	.6	.5	1.3	12.1
2013–14	Petron / San Miguel	37	35.5	.549	.000	—	.628	14.2	1.4	.5	2.1	16.8
2014–15	San Miguel	54	35.0	.589	.167	—	.703	12.9	1.3	.4	1.7	17.4
2015–16	San Miguel	52	33.8	.573	.000	—	.658	12.2	1.3	.5	1.4	19.7
2016–17	San Miguel	56	32.6	.612	.250	—	.695	11.3	1.6	.4	2.0	17.2
2017–18	San Miguel	47	35.2	.601	.000	—	.668	12.4	1.6	.6	1.3	20.6
2019	San Miguel	61	33.3	.572	.250	—	.706	13.0	1.9	.6	1.5	18.9
2021	San Miguel	32	31.6	.571	.000	—	.627	11.0	1.8	.4	1.1	13.8
2022–23	San Miguel	46	35.4	.595	.500	—	.678	13.5	2.9	.7	1.3	17.7
2023–24	San Miguel	38	36.5	.558	.318	—	.710	13.4	2.8	.7	1.7	17.8
2024–25	San Miguel	58	36.6	.606	.297	.000	.710	15.1	3.1	.7	1.0	19.2
2025–26	San Miguel	53	34.8	.585	.304	.000	.636	14.6	3.1	.8	1.0	15.6
Career		579	34.0	.584	.275	.000	.672	12.8	2.0	.6	1.5	17.4

=== National team ===
Year	Team	GP	MPG	FG%	3P%	FT%	RPG	APG	SPG	BPG	PPG
2013 FIBA Asia Championship	Philippines	7	4.3	.143	.000	.500	1.3	0.0	0.0	0.1	0.4
2014 FIBA Asia Cup	Philippines	5	10.8	.273	.000	.750	2.2	0.4	0.0	0.2	1.8
2014 FIBA Basketball World Cup	Philippines	5	12.8	.545	.000	.818	4.2	0.4	0.8	0.6	6.6
2014 Asian Games	Philippines	7	11.7	.484	.000	.563	5.0	0.6	1.0	0.1	5.6
2017 SEABA Championship	Philippines	6	14.3	.542	.000	.577	7.0	1.0	0.2	0.7	9.2
2017 FIBA Asia Cup	Philippines	3	12.7	.375	.000	.750	3.0	0.0	0.3	0.3	6.0
2019 FIBA Basketball World Cup – Asian Qualifiers	Philippines	10	18.2	.556	.000	.600	4.7	0.7	0.5	0.5	10.8
2019 FIBA Basketball World Cup	Philippines	5	17.2	.478	.000	.812	5.0	0.6	0.8	0.4	7.0
2019 Southeast Asian Games	Philippines	4	17.1	.657	.000	.750	10.0	1.0	0.5	0.3	15.3
2021 Southeast Asian Games	Philippines	6	18.8	.733	.333	.710	8.5	0.5	0.3	0.5	15.2
2023 FIBA Basketball World Cup – Asian Qualifiers	Philippines	2	14.5	.250	1.000	.833	5.0	1.5	0.0	0.0	5.0
2023 FIBA Basketball World Cup	Philippines	5	18.0	.650	.000	.700	5.0	0.4	0.2	0.2	6.6
2022 Asian Games	Philippines	7	21.4	.585	.000	.938	5.7	1.7	0.6	0.7	9.0
