= 2015–16 PBA Philippine Cup =

- Duration: October 21, 2015 – February 3, 2016
- TV partner(s): Local: Sports5; TV5; Fox Sports Asia; Cignal PPV (HD); Hyper (HD); International: AksyonTV International

Finals
- Champions: San Miguel Beermen
- Runners-up: Alaska Aces

Awards
- Best Player: June Mar Fajardo (San Miguel Beermen)
- Finals MVP: Chris Ross (San Miguel Beermen)

PBA Philippine Cup chronology
- < 2014–15 2016–17 >

PBA conference chronology
- < 2015 Governors' 2016 Commissioner's >

The 2015–16 Philippine Basketball Association (PBA) Philippine Cup, also known as the 2015–16 SmartBRO-PBA Philippine Cup for sponsorship reasons, was the first conference of the 2015–16 PBA season. The tournament started on October 21, 2015, and was finished on February 3, 2016. The tournament did not allow teams to hire foreign players or imports.

== Format ==
The following format was observed for the duration of the conference:

- Single-round robin eliminations; 11 games per team; Teams are then seeded by basis on win–loss records. Ties are broken among the head-to-head records of the tied teams.
- The top two teams after the elimination round will automatically advance to the semifinals.
- The next eight teams will play in a double-phase quarterfinal round. The #3 to #6 seed will have twice-to-beat advantage against their opponent. Phase 1 matchups are:
  - QF1: #3 team vs. #10 team
  - QF2: #4 team vs. #9 team
  - QF3: #5 team vs. #8 team
  - QF4: #6 team vs. #7 team
- The winners of Phase 1 will advance to the knockout phase. The match ups are:
  - KO1: QF1 vs. QF4
  - KO2: QF2 vs. QF3
- The winners of the quarterfinals will challenge the top two teams in a best-of-seven semifinals series. Match ups are:
  - SF1: #1 vs. KO2
  - SF2: #2 vs. KO1
- The winners in the semifinals advance to the best of seven finals.

== Elimination round ==
=== Team standings ===
| Pos | Team | W | L | PCT | GB | Qualification |
|---|---|---|---|---|---|---|
| 1 | Alaska Aces | 9 | 2 | .818 (Note: Head-to-head record: Alaska 1–0 San Miguel) | — | Advance to semifinals |
| 2 | San Miguel Beermen | 9 | 2 | .818 | — | Advance to semifinals |
| 3 | Rain or Shine Elasto Painters | 8 | 3 | .727 | 1 | Twice-to-beat in the quarterfinals |
| 4 | Barangay Ginebra San Miguel | 7 | 4 | .636 (Note: Head-to-head record: Barangay Ginebra 1–0 GlobalPort) | 2 | Twice-to-beat in the quarterfinals |
| 5 | GlobalPort Batang Pier | 7 | 4 | .636 | 2 | Twice-to-beat in the quarterfinals |
| 6 | TNT Tropang Texters | 6 | 5 | .545 | 3 | Twice-to-beat in the quarterfinals |
| 7 | NLEX Road Warriors | 5 | 6 | .455 (Note: Head-to-head record: NLEX 1–0 Barako Bull) | 4 | Twice-to-win in the quarterfinals |
| 8 | Barako Bull Energy | 5 | 6 | .455 | 4 | Twice-to-win in the quarterfinals |
| 9 | Star Hotshots | 4 | 7 | .364 | 5 | Twice-to-win in the quarterfinals |
| 10 | Blackwater Elite | 3 | 8 | .273 | 6 | Twice-to-win in the quarterfinals |
| 11 | Mahindra Enforcer | 2 | 9 | .182 | 7 | |
| 12 | Meralco Bolts | 1 | 10 | .091 | 8 | |

Source: PBA.ph

=== Schedule ===
| Team ╲ Game | 1 | 2 | 3 | 4 | 5 | 6 | 7 | 8 | 9 | 10 | 11 |
|---|---|---|---|---|---|---|---|---|---|---|---|
| Alaska Aces | TNT | BW | MAH | BGSM | GP | SH | NLEX | MER | ROS | SMB | BBE |
| Barako Bull Energy | NLEX | BGSM | GP | MER | MAH | SMB | ROS | TNT | BW | SH | ALA |
| Barangay Ginebra San Miguel | SH | BBE | ALA | SMB | MER | MAH | GP | ROS | BW | NLEX | TNT |
| Blackwater Elite | NLEX | ALA | MER | SMB | ROS | TNT | GP | BGSM | BBE | SH | MAH |
| GlobalPort Batang Pier | SMB | SH | BBE | ROS | ALA | BGSM | BW | NLEX | MER | MAH | TNT |
| Mahindra Enforcer | ROS | TNT | ALA | NLEX | BBE | BGSM | MER | SMB | SH | GP | BW |
| Meralco Bolts | SMB | BW | TNT | BBE | BGSM | SH | NLEX | MAH | ALA | GP | ROS |
| NLEX Road Warriors | BW | BBE | SH | MAH | TNT | MER | ALA | GP | SMB | BGSM | ROS |
| Rain or Shine Elasto Painters | SH | MAH | SMB | GP | BW | BBE | BGSM | TNT | ALA | MER | NLEX |
| San Miguel Beermen | GP | MER | ROS | BW | BGSM | BBE | SH | MAH | NLEX | TNT | ALA |
| Star Hotshots | ROS | BGSM | GP | NLEX | TNT | MER | ALA | SMB | MAH | BBE | BW |
| TNT Tropang Texters | ALA | MAH | MER | SH | NLEX | BW | BBE | ROS | SMB | GP | BGSM |

= Win; = OT win; = Loss; = OT loss

=== Results ===
| Team | ALA | BBE | BGSM | BWE | GP | MAH | MER | NLEX | ROS | SMB | SH | TNT |
|---|---|---|---|---|---|---|---|---|---|---|---|---|
| Alaska | | 108–100 | 92–93 | 87–79 | 123–104 | 98–94 | 88–86 | 89–81 | 105–111 | 103–97 | 107–102 | 114–98 |
| Barako Bull | — | | 82–79 | 92–116 | 91–105* | 93–85 | 108–106 | 85–93 | 104–110 | 105–106 | 101–83 | 105–98* |
| Barangay Ginebra | — | — | | 102–94** | 85–70 | 80–76 | 89–64 | 91–90 | 86–94 | 82–100 | 78–86 | 91–84 |
| Blackwater | — | — | — | | 105–120 | 108–99 | 92–90 | 86–90 | 81–103 | 83–93 | 89–102 | 98–109 |
| GlobalPort | — | — | — | — | | 118–116* | 108–104 | 96–90 | 113–111 | 86–97 | 101–94 | 96–107 |
| Mahindra | — | — | — | — | — | | 86–83 | 103–93 | 94–108 | 86–102 | 96–104 | 97–101 |
| Meralco | — | — | — | — | — | — | | 91–93 | 87–97 | 85–101 | 87–83 | 91–105 |
| NLEX | — | — | — | — | — | — | — | | 111–106 | 80–88* | 95–97 | 107–101 |
| Rain or Shine | — | — | — | — | — | — | — | — | | 99–84 | 96–87 | 85–95 |
| San Miguel | — | — | — | — | — | — | — | — | — | | 101–90 | 97–84 |
| Star | — | — | — | — | — | — | — | — | — | — | | 86–91 |
| TNT | — | — | — | — | — | — | — | — | — | — | — | |

Legend: Blue = left column team win; Red = top row team win.
Matches with lighter background shading were decided after overtime.

== Bracket ==
Quarterfinals (1st phase) (Higher seeds twice-to-beat)
3 | Rain or Shine | 95
10 | Blackwater | 90
6 | TNT | 90
7 | NLEX | 88
4 | Barangay Ginebra | 92*
9 | Star | 89
5 | GlobalPort | 94
8 | Barako Bull | 85

Quarterfinals (2nd phase) (Single elimination)
3 | Rain or Shine | 104
6 | TNT | 89
4 | Barangay Ginebra | 83
5 | GlobalPort | 84*

Semifinals (Best-of-7)
2 | San Miguel | 4
3 | Rain or Shine | 2
1 | Alaska | 4
5 | GlobalPort | 1

Finals (Best-of-7)
2 | San Miguel | 4
1 | Alaska | 3

*Game went into overtime

== Quarterfinals ==
=== First phase ===
In this round, the higher-seeded team in the series has the twice-to-beat advantage.

==== (3) Rain or Shine vs. (10) Blackwater ====
December 26

Boxscore

Rain or Shine Elasto Painters 95, Blackwater Elite 90
Scoring by quarter: 17–14, 27–20, 25–26, 26–30
| Pts: Chan 17; Rebs: Belga 10; Asts: Belga, Chan 4 | Pts: Lastimosa 35; Rebs: Ballesteros, Erram 8 Asts: Lastimosa 5 |
Rain or Shine wins series in one game

Mall of Asia Arena, Pasay
Referees: J. Mariano, P. Balao, M. Montoya, M. Flordeliza

==== (4) Barangay Ginebra vs. (9) Star ====
December 25

Boxscore

Barangay Ginebra San Miguel 92, Star Hotshots 89 (OT)
Scoring by quarter: 21–18, 17–19, 16–25, 26–18, Overtime: 12–9
| Pts: Mercado 17; Rebs: Aguilar 14; Asts: Tenorio 6 | Pts: Simon 17; Rebs: Reavis 12; Asts: three players 2 |
Barangay Ginebra wins series in one game

Mall of Asia Arena, Pasay
Attendance: 21,808
Referees: M. Quilingen, E. Aquino, R. Yante, R. Dacanay

==== (5) GlobalPort vs. (8) Barako Bull ====
December 25

Boxscore

GlobalPort Batang Pier 94, Barako Bull Energy 85
Scoring by quarter: 21–25, 20–23, 28–16, 25–21
| Pts: Romeo 33; Rebs: Pringle 13; Asts: Romeo 5 | Pts: Wilson 15; Rebs: Wilson 15; Asts: Wilson 5 |
GlobalPort wins series in one game

Mall of Asia Arena, Pasay
Attendance: 21,808
Referees: J. Mariano, S. Pineda, R. Gruta, A. Guevarra

==== (6) TNT vs. (7) NLEX ====
December 26

Boxscore

TNT Tropang Texters 90, NLEX Road Warriors 88
Scoring by quarter: 11–21, 25–15, 25–31, 29–21
| Pts: Rosario 20; Rebs: Fonacier, Williams 8 Asts: Castro, R. Reyes 4 | Pts: Taulava 22; Rebs: Anthony 13; Asts: Cardona, J. Villanueva 3 |
TNT wins series in one game

Mall of Asia Arena, Pasay
Referees: A. Herrera, E. Tangkion, J. Marabe, R. Yante

=== Second phase ===
This is a one-game playoff. The winner advances to the semifinals.

==== (3) Rain or Shine vs. (6) TNT ====
December 28

Boxscore

Rain or Shine Elasto Painters 104, TNT Tropang Texters 89
Scoring by quarter: 26–21, 26–24, 32–31, 20–13
| Pts: Almazan 15; Rebs: Almazan, Ponferada 10; Asts: Belga 7 | Pts: Castro 25; Rebs: Castro 11; Asts: Castro 4 |

Mall of Asia Arena, Pasay
Referees: A. Herrera, R. Marabe, E. Tangkion, J. Narandan

==== (4) Barangay Ginebra vs. (5) GlobalPort ====
December 27

Boxscore

Barangay Ginebra San Miguel 83, GlobalPort Batang Pier 84 (OT)
Scoring by quarter: 16–18, 16–15, 21–20, 21–21, Overtime: 9–10
| Pts: Slaughter 25; Rebs: Slaughter 18; Asts: Mercado, Tenorio 5 | Pts: Pringle 25; Rebs: three players 8 Asts: Romeo 5 |

Mall of Asia Arena, Pasay
Referees: E. Aquino, R. Gruta, M. Montoya, J. Oliva

In the final 8 seconds of overtime period of the knockout quarterfinal game between Barangay Ginebra San Miguel and GlobalPort Batang Pier, review showed that Stanley Pringle held the ball for over 5 seconds, which would have resulted in a five-second ball-hogging violation, but no call was made. After the final buzzer, the Batang Pier already went to the dugout, but Ginebra stayed behind. Ginebra fans, which were more than half of the crowd, were left stunned along with players and the Ginebra coaching staff. Head coach Tim Cone immediately went to center court and pleaded with the referees for a call or a review of the final 8-second possession of Globalport. He then went to the scorer's table and signed the official scorecard, signifying the team's intent to file a protest with the game's result. He stayed mum after coming out of the dugout on whether they would actually file a protest. Under the league's rules, Barangay Ginebra had until 12 noon of December 28, 2015, to file a letter of protest together with a bond, which requires a minimum of P20,000.

Some fans who waited by the players exit booed and threw coins at the car of GlobalPort forward Jay Washington, who left the venue with his family. Security struggled to control the mob of angry fans. When the car started to leave, Washington opened the window and shouted, "Better luck next conference!" to the crowd.

A day after, Barangay Ginebra did not send a formal protest to the PBA office as the 12 noon deadline lapsed. Commissioner Chito Narvasa said that the league summoned the four referees of the Ginebra-GlobalPort game, Edward Aquino, Rommel Gruta, Mardy Montoya and Bing Oliva, on December 29 and re-evaluated their performance during the quarterfinal game. According to the findings of the PBA technical committee, two violations were not called: the five-second ball-hogging violation and the backcourt violation committed by Stanley Pringle. Referees Edward Aquino and Rommel Gruta were therefore suspended for the rest of the Philippine Cup.

== Semifinals ==
This is a best-of-seven round. The winner advances to the finals.

=== (1) Alaska vs. (5) GlobalPort ===
January 4

Boxscore

Alaska Aces 93, GlobalPort Batang Pier 107
Scoring by quarter: 18–29, 24–23, 32–30, 19–25
| Pts: Baguio 15; Rebs: Thoss 12; Asts: Baguio, Jazul 3 | Pts: Romeo 41; Rebs: Kramer 10; Asts: three players 4 |

Mall of Asia Arena, Pasay
Referees: P. Balao, J. Mariano, S. Pineda, J. Oliva

January 6

Boxscore

Alaska Aces 100, GlobalPort Batang Pier 76
Scoring by quarter: 18–18, 29–26, 28–16, 25–16
| Pts: Banchero 18; Rebs: Abueva 11; Asts: Baguio, Casio 4 | Pts: Pringle 22; Rebs: Kramer 10; Asts: Romeo 5 |

Smart Araneta Coliseum, Quezon City
Referees: A. Herrera, E. Tangkion, R. Dacanay, M. Montoya

January 8

Boxscore

Alaska Aces 82, GlobalPort Batang Pier 69
Scoring by quarter: 26–13, 10–13, 17–27, 29–16
| Pts: Manuel 16; Rebs: Abueva 15; Asts: Jazul, Thoss 4 | Pts: Romeo 17; Rebs: Maierhofer, Pringle 12; Asts: Washington 3 |

Mall of Asia Arena, Pasay
Referees: M. Quilinguen, P. Balao, B. Oliva, M. Flordeliza

January 10

Boxscore

Alaska Aces 109, GlobalPort Batang Pier 84
Scoring by quarter: 32–20, 22–20, 28–22, 27–22
| Pts: Abueva 20; Rebs: Abueva 13; Asts: Casio 4 | Pts: Romeo 24; Rebs: Washington 8 Asts: Pringle 4 |

Smart Araneta Coliseum, Quezon City
Referees: P. Balao, J. Mariano, R. Yante, M. Flordeliza

January 12

Boxscore

Alaska Aces 118, GlobalPort Batang Pier 89
Scoring by quarter: 27–17, 33–34, 27–22, 31–16
| Pts: Exciminiano 19; Rebs: Abueva 9 Asts: Baguio 6 | Pts: Washington 26; Rebs: Maierhofer 9 Asts: Yeo 5 |
Alaska wins series, 4–1

Smart Araneta Coliseum, Quezon City
Referees: J. Mariano, E. Tangkion, N. Guevarra, D. Dacanay

=== (2) San Miguel vs. (3) Rain or Shine ===
January 5

Boxscore

San Miguel Beermen 109, Rain or Shine Elasto Painters 105
Scoring by quarter: 21–31, 29–37, 21–23, 38–14
| Pts: Fajardo 36; Rebs: Fajardo 18; Asts: Santos 5 | Pts: Belga, Quiñahan 19; Rebs: Quiñahan 11; Asts: Cruz 6 |

Mall of Asia Arena, Pasay
Referees: A. Herrera, M. Quilinguen, R. Yante, R. Marabe

January 7

Boxscore

San Miguel Beermen 97, Rain or Shine Elasto Painters 105
Scoring by quarter: 15–31, 19–18, 31–30, 32–26
| Pts: Fajardo 38; Rebs: Fajardo 17; Asts: Lassiter 4 | Pts: Chan 16; Rebs: Ponferada 10; Asts: Ahanmisi 6 |

Smart Araneta Coliseum, Quezon City
Referees: J. Mariano, E. Tangkion, A. Guevarra, J. Narandan

January 9

Boxscore

San Miguel Beermen 106, Rain or Shine Elasto Painters 111
Scoring by quarter: 27–26, 23–32, 36–20, 20– 33
| Pts: Fajardo 40; Rebs: Fajardo 20; Asts: Cabagnot 6 | Pts: Lee 18; Rebs: Belga 14; Asts: Ahanmisi 6 |

Smart Araneta Coliseum, Quezon City
Referees: A. Herrera, M. Quilinguen, R. Marabe, R. Dacanay

January 11

Boxscore

San Miguel Beermen 105, Rain or Shine Elasto Painters 92
Scoring by quarter: 28–25, 25–21, 37–22, 15–24
| Pts: Fajardo 33; Rebs: Fajardo 15; Asts: three players 3 | Pts: Ahanmisi, Trollano 15; Rebs: Ahanmisi 7 Asts: Tiu 5 |

Smart Araneta Coliseum, Quezon City
Referees: A. Herrera, P. Balao, J. Narandan, M. Montoya

January 13

Boxscore

San Miguel Beermen 103, Rain or Shine Elasto Painters 94
Scoring by quarter: 17–13, 33–32, 22–23, 31–26
| Pts: Fajardo 27; Rebs: Fajardo 12; Asts: Cabagnot 6 | Pts: Quiñahan 20; Rebs: Norwood 10; Asts: Ahanmisi 3 |

Smart Araneta Coliseum, Quezon City
Referees: N. Quilinguen, P. Balao, R. Yante, M. Flordeliza

January 15

Boxscore

San Miguel Beermen 90, Rain or Shine Elasto Painters 82
Scoring by quarter: 19–16, 18–30, 33–17, 20–19
| Pts: Lassiter 22; Rebs: Santos 19; Asts: Ross 6 | Pts: Belga 16; Rebs: Belga 11; Asts: Ahanmisi, Tiu 3 |
San Miguel wins series, 4–2

Smart Araneta Coliseum, Quezon City
Referees: A. Herrera, J. Mariano, N. Guevarra, R. Marabe

The two-time PBA MVP Fajardo had shrugs off hard fouls by different Rain or Shine players had had given him a "hard life" as promised until game 6 wherein he finally fell down and injured his left knee (torn ACL) because of a hard box-out play by Rain or Shine forward Jireh Ibañes. Fajardo, who was wincing in pain, had to be stretchered out off the playing court at the 7:11 mark of the third and was later brought to St. Luke's Medical Center in Bonifacio Global City, Taguig.

After the game, Ibañes says he meant no harm against Fajardo. The injury had not only put a damper on San Miguel's return to the finals but also to Gilas Pilipinas 2016 Olympic qualifiers as he had to sit out for the rest of the season because of a torn ACL.

== Finals ==
TV5

January 17
5:00pm

Boxscore

Alaska Aces 100, San Miguel Beermen 91
Scoring by quarter: 23–23, 15–19, 28–33, 34–16

Smart Araneta Coliseum, Quezon City
Referees: A. Herrera, P. Balao, E. Tangkion, J. Oliva

TV5

January 19
7:00pm

Boxscore

Alaska Aces 83, San Miguel Beermen 80
Scoring by quarter: 23–18, 16–18, 23–24, 21–20

Smart Araneta Coliseum, Quezon City
Referees: P. Balao, J. Mariano, E. Tangkion, J. Oliva

TV5

January 22
7:00pm

Boxscore

Alaska Aces 82, San Miguel Beermen 75
Scoring by quarter: 20–17, 11–24, 24–17, 27–17

Quezon Convention Center, Lucena
Referees: N. Quilinguen, P. Balao, E. Tangkion, S. Pineda

TV5

January 24
5:00pm

Boxscore

Alaska Aces 104, San Miguel Beermen 110 (OT)
Scoring by quarter: 28–20, 21–23, 28–26, 21–29, Overtime: 6–12

PhilSports Arena, Pasig
Referees: N. Quilinguen, R. Marabe, R. Dacanay, J. Oliva

TV5

January 27
7:00pm

Boxscore

Alaska Aces 73, San Miguel Beermen 86 (OT)
Scoring by quarter: 20–23, 16–13, 19–16, 12–15, Overtime: 6–19

Smart Araneta Coliseum, Quezon City
Referees: J. Mariano, N. Guevarra, J. Marabe, E. Tangkion

TV5

January 29
7:00pm

Boxscore

Alaska Aces 89, San Miguel Beermen 100
Scoring by quarter: 29–22, 20–29, 17–16, 23–33

Smart Araneta Coliseum, Quezon City
Referees: A. Herrera, P. Balao, N. Guevara, S. Pineda

TV5

February 3
7:00pm

Boxscore

Alaska Aces 89, San Miguel Beermen 96
Scoring by quarter: 16–22, 22–21, 13–25, 38–28
San Miguel wins series, 4–3

Mall of Asia Arena, Pasay
Referees: N. Quilinguen, N. Guevarra, R. Dacanay, J. Oliva

== Awards ==
=== Conference ===
- Best Player of the Conference: June Mar Fajardo (San Miguel Beermen)
- Finals MVP: Chris Ross (San Miguel Beermen)

=== Players of the Week ===
| Week | Player | Ref. |
|---|---|---|
| October 21–25 | JR Quiñahan (Rain or Shine Elasto Painters) | |
| October 26–31 | Stanley Pringle (GlobalPort Batang Pier) | |
| November 1–8 | Greg Slaughter (Barangay Ginebra San Miguel) | |
| November 9–15 | Stanley Pringle (GlobalPort Batang Pier) | |
| November 16–22 | Sean Anthony (NLEX Road Warriors) | |
| November 23–29 | Jericho Cruz (Rain or Shine Elasto Painters) | |
| November 30 – December 6 | Willy Wilson (Barako Bull Energy) | |
| December 7–13 | Terrence Romeo (GlobalPort Batang Pier) | |
| December 14–20 | Sean Anthony (NLEX Road Warriors) | |
| December 21–28 | Stanley Pringle (GlobalPort Batang Pier) | |

== Statistics ==
=== Individual statistic leaders ===
| Category | Player | Team | Statistic |
|---|---|---|---|
| Points per game | Terrence Romeo | GlobalPort Batang Pier | 25.2 |
| Rebounds per game | Greg Slaughter | Barangay Ginebra San Miguel | 14.5 |
| Assists per game | Jayson Castro | TNT Tropang Texters | 4.9 |
| Steals per game | LA Revilla | Mahindra Enforcer | 2.0 |
| Blocks per game | John Paul Erram | Blackwater Elite | 1.9 |
| Turnovers per game | June Mar Fajardo | San Miguel Beermen | 4.0 |
| Fouls per game | John Paul Erram | Blackwater Elite | 4.5 |
| Minutes per game | Greg Slaughter | Barangay Ginebra San Miguel | 38.7 |
| FG% | Bradwyn Guinto | Mahindra Enforcer | 58.5% |
| FT% | Mark Borboran | NLEX Road Warriors | 100.0% |
| FT% | Reynel Hugnatan | Meralco Bolts | 100.0% |
| 3FG% | Aldrech Ramos | Mahindra Enforcer | 57.6% |
| Double-doubles | June Mar Fajardo | San Miguel Beermen | 17 |

=== Individual game highs ===
| Category | Player | Team | Statistic |
|---|---|---|---|
| Points | June Mar Fajardo | San Miguel Beermen | 43 |
| Rebounds | Greg Slaughter | Barangay Ginebra San Miguel | 26 |
| Assists | RJ Jazul | Alaska Aces | 10 |
| Steals | Chris Ross | San Miguel Beermen | 7 |
| Blocks | John Paul Erram | Blackwater Elite | 7 |
| Three Pointers | Gary David | Meralco Bolts | 7 |
| Three Pointers | Terrence Romeo | GlobalPort Batang Pier | 7 |

=== Team statistic leaders ===
| Category | Team | Statistic |
|---|---|---|
| Points per game | Rain or Shine Elasto Painters | 100.4 |
| Rebounds per game | Barangay Ginebra San Miguel | 53.1 |
| Assists per game | Rain or Shine Elasto Painters | 20.3 |
| Steals per game | Mahindra Enforcer | 7.4 |
| Blocks per game | San Miguel Beermen | 5.3 |
| Turnovers per game | Star Hotshots | 19.8 |
| FG% | Rain or Shine Elasto Painters | 44.0% |
| FT% | Barako Bull Energy | 74.0% |
| 3FG% | TNT Tropang Texters | 34.5% |
