= 2013–14 PBA Philippine Cup =

Philippine basketball tournament held in 2013–14

- Duration: November 17, 2013 – February 26, 2014
- TV partner(s): Sports5; TV5 and AksyonTV (local); Fox Sports Asia and AksyonTV International (international)

Finals
- Champions: San Mig Super Coffee Mixers
- Runners-up: Rain or Shine Elasto Painters

Awards
- Best Player: June Mar Fajardo (Petron Blaze Boosters)
- Finals MVP: Mark Barroca (San Mig Super Coffee Mixers)

PBA Philippine Cup chronology
- < 2012–13 2014–15 >

PBA conference chronology
- < 2013 Governors' 2014 Commissioner's >

The 2013–14 Philippine Basketball Association (PBA) Philippine Cup, also known as the 2013–14 PLDT Home DSL/myDSL-PBA Philippine Cup for sponsorship reasons, was the first conference of the 2013–14 PBA season. The tournament started on November 17, 2013, and ended on February 26, 2014. The tournament does not allow teams to hire foreign players or imports.

== Format ==
The following format was observed for the duration of the tournament:

- Two-round eliminations, with each team playing 14 games. The teams are divided into two groups on the basis of their natural draft order from the previous rookie draft. Each team will play teams within their group once, while they will play teams from the other group twice.
  - Group A:
    - Air21 Express
    - Alaska Aces
    - Barangay Ginebra San Miguel
    - Petron Blaze Boosters
    - Rain or Shine Elasto Painters
  - Group B:
    - Meralco Bolts
    - San Mig Super Coffee Mixers
    - Barako Bull Energy
    - GlobalPort Batang Pier
    - Talk 'N Text Tropang Texters
- Top eight teams will advance to the quarterfinals. In case of tie, playoffs will be held only for the #2 and #8 seeds.
- Quarterfinals:
  - QF1: #1 seed vs #8 seed (#1 seed twice-to-beat)
  - QF2: #2 seed vs #7 seed (#2 seed twice-to-beat)
  - QF3: #3 seed vs #6 seed (best-of-3 series)
  - QF4: #4 seed vs #5 seed (best-of-3 series)
- Semifinals (best-of-7 series):
  - SF1: QF1 vs. QF4 winners
  - SF2: QF2 vs. QF3 winners
- Finals (best-of-7 series)
  - Winners of the semifinals

== Elimination round ==
=== Team standings ===
Pos	Team	W	L	PCT	GB	Qualification
1	Barangay Ginebra San Miguel	11	3	.786 (Note: Head-to-head record: Barangay Ginebra 1–0 Rain or Shine)	—	Twice-to-beat in the quarterfinals
2	Rain or Shine Elasto Painters	11	3	.786	—	Twice-to-beat in the quarterfinals
3	Petron Blaze Boosters	10	4	.714	1	Best-of-three quarterfinals
4	Talk 'N Text Tropang Texters	8	6	.571	3	Best-of-three quarterfinals
5	San Mig Super Coffee Mixers	7	7	.500	4	Best-of-three quarterfinals
6	Barako Bull Energy	5	9	.357 (Note: Head-to-head quotient: Barako Bull 1.06, GlobalPort 1.01, Alaska 0.99, Meralco 0.95; eighth seed playoff: Alaska 94–91 Meralco)	6	Best-of-three quarterfinals
7	GlobalPort Batang Pier	5	9	.357	6	Twice-to-win in the quarterfinals
8	Alaska Aces	5	9	.357	6	Twice-to-win in the quarterfinals
9	Meralco Bolts	5	9	.357	6	
10	Air21 Express	3	11	.214	8	

Source: PBA.ph

=== Results ===
Team	A21	ALA	BBE	BGSM	GP	MER	PBB	ROS	SMSC	TNT
Air21		91–97*	75–88	69–78	100–114	79–112	88–90	94–104	83–92**	82–87
Alaska			93–97	89–96	84–94	91–82	85–86	74–87	84–80	111–114*
Barako Bull	77–92	80–89		79–85	108–95	99–86	90–96	83–91	88–90	80–87*
Barangay Ginebra			90–83		109–104	87–100	97–83	97–84	86–69	97–95
GlobalPort	103–109*	91–88*		92–108		93–89	87–97	90–88	80–83	93–106
Meralco	92–88	74–65		82–83			73–77	89–92	72–64	80–89
Petron Blaze			88–92		98–87	96–87		95–99*	91–78	77–63
Rain or Shine	104–94		99–95		98–87	89–86			86–83	87–90
San Mig Coffee	67–60	75–88		83–79			112–93	77–101		100–87
Talk 'N Text	100–102	121–117		103–79			91–105	88–90		

Legend: Blue = left column team win; Red = top row team win.
Matches with lighter background shading were decided after overtime.

== Eighth seed playoff ==
January 20

8th seed

Meralco Bolts 91, Alaska Aces 94

Mall of Asia Arena, Pasay

== Bracket ==
Quarterfinals
(#1 twice-to-beat)
1	Barangay Ginebra	97	108
8	Alaska	104	95
(Best-of-3)
4	Talk 'N Text	1
5	San Mig Coffee	2
(#2 twice-to-beat)
2	Rain or Shine	106
7	GlobalPort	96
(Best-of-3)
3	Petron Blaze	2
6	Barako Bull	0

Semifinals (Best-of-7)
1	Barangay Ginebra	3
5	San Mig Coffee	4
2	Rain or Shine	4
3	Petron Blaze	1

Finals (Best-of-7)
5	San Mig Coffee	4
2	Rain or Shine	2

== Quarterfinals ==
=== (1) Barangay Ginebra vs. (8) Alaska ===
January 22

Barangay Ginebra San Miguel 97, Alaska Aces 104

Mall of Asia Arena, Pasay

January 25

Barangay Ginebra San Miguel 108, Alaska Aces 95
Barangay Ginebra wins series in two games.

Cuneta Astrodome, Pasay

=== (2) Rain or Shine vs. (7) GlobalPort ===
January 22

Rain or Shine Elasto Painters 106, GlobalPort Batang Pier 96
Rain or Shine wins series in one game.

Mall of Asia Arena, Pasay

=== (3) Petron Blaze vs. (6) Barako Bull ===
January 21

Petron Blaze Boosters 101, Barako Bull Energy 88

Mall of Asia Arena, Pasay

January 24

Petron Blaze Boosters 107, Barako Bull Energy 100
Petron Blaze wins series, 2–0

Mall of Asia Arena, Pasay

=== (4) Talk 'N Text vs. (5) San Mig Super Coffee ===
January 21

Talk 'N Text Tropang Texters 83, San Mig Super Coffee Mixers 90

Mall of Asia Arena, Pasay

January 24

Talk 'N Text Tropang Texters 82, San Mig Super Coffee Mixers 77

Mall of Asia Arena, Pasay

January 26

Talk 'N Text Tropang Texters 82, San Mig Super Coffee Mixers 90
San Mig Super Coffee wins series, 2–1

Cuneta Astrodome, Pasay

== Semifinals ==
=== (1) Barangay Ginebra vs. (5) San Mig Super Coffee ===
January 28

Barangay Ginebra San Miguel 83, San Mig Super Coffee Mixers 85

Mall of Asia Arena, Pasay

January 31

Barangay Ginebra San Miguel 93, San Mig Super Coffee Mixers 64

Smart Araneta Coliseum, Quezon City

February 2

Barangay Ginebra San Miguel 89, San Mig Super Coffee Mixers 97

Mall of Asia Arena, Pasay

February 5

Barangay Ginebra San Miguel 85, San Mig Super Coffee Mixers 82

Smart Araneta Coliseum, Quezon City

February 8

Barangay Ginebra San Miguel 76, San Mig Super Coffee Mixers 79

Smart Araneta Coliseum, Quezon City

February 10

Barangay Ginebra San Miguel 94, San Mig Super Coffee Mixers 91

Smart Araneta Coliseum, Quezon City

February 12

Barangay Ginebra San Miguel 87, San Mig Super Coffee Mixers 110
San Mig Super Coffee wins series, 4–3

Smart Araneta Coliseum, Quezon City

=== (2) Rain or Shine vs. (3) Petron Blaze ===
January 27

Rain or Shine Elasto Painters 103, Petron Blaze Boosters 95

Mall of Asia Arena, Pasay

January 29

Rain or Shine Elasto Painters 103, Petron Blaze Boosters 94

Mall of Asia Arena, Pasay

February 1

Rain or Shine Elasto Painters 73, Petron Blaze Boosters 106

Mall of Asia Arena, Pasay

February 3

Rain or Shine Elasto Painters 88, Petron Blaze Boosters 83

Smart Araneta Coliseum, Quezon City

February 7

Rain or Shine Elasto Painters 97, Petron Blaze Boosters 88
Rain or Shine wins series, 4–1

Smart Araneta Coliseum, Quezon City

== Finals ==
February 14

San Mig Super Coffee Mixers 80, Rain or Shine Elasto Painters 83

Smart Araneta Coliseum, Quezon City

February 16

San Mig Super Coffee Mixers 80, Rain or Shine Elasto Painters 70

Smart Araneta Coliseum, Quezon City

February 19

San Mig Super Coffee Mixers 77, Rain or Shine Elasto Painters 76

Smart Araneta Coliseum, Quezon City

February 21

San Mig Super Coffee Mixers 93, Rain or Shine Elasto Painters 90

Smart Araneta Coliseum, Quezon City

February 23

San Mig Super Coffee Mixers 74, Rain or Shine Elasto Painters 81

Smart Araneta Coliseum, Quezon City

February 26

San Mig Super Coffee Mixers 93, Rain or Shine Elasto Painters 87
San Mig Super Coffee wins series, 4–2

Smart Araneta Coliseum, Quezon City

== Awards ==
=== Conference ===
- Best Player of the Conference: June Mar Fajardo (Petron Blaze Boosters)
- Finals MVP: Mark Barroca (San Mig Super Coffee Mixers)

=== Players of the Week ===
Week	Player	Ref.
November 18–24	Ronjay Buenafe (Barako Bull Energy)	
November 25 – December 1	Mark Caguioa (Barangay Ginebra San Miguel)	
December 2–8	Sol Mercado (GlobalPort Batang Pier)	
December 9–15	Alex Cabagnot (Petron Blaze Boosters)	
December 16–22	Jayson Castro (Talk 'N Text Tropang Texters)	
December 23–29	Japeth Aguilar (Barangay Ginebra San Miguel)	
January 4–5	Danny Ildefonso (Meralco Bolts)	
January 6–12	Beau Belga (Rain or Shine Elasto Painters)	
January 13–19	Mark Barroca (San Mig Super Coffee Mixers)	
January 20–26	Mark Barroca (San Mig Super Coffee Mixers)	
January 24 – February 2	Mark Barroca (San Mig Super Coffee Mixers)	
February 3–9	Beau Belga (Rain or Shine Elasto Painters)	
