= 2015 PBA Commissioner's Cup =

- Duration: January 27 – April 29, 2015
- TV partner(s): Local: Sports5; TV5; AksyonTV; Cignal PPV (high-definition); Fox Sports Philippines; International: AksyonTV International

Finals
- Champions: Talk 'N Text Tropang Texters
- Runners-up: Rain or Shine Elasto Painters

Awards
- Best Player: Jayson Castro (Talk 'N Text Tropang Texters)
- Best Import: Wayne Chism (Rain or Shine Elasto Painters)
- Finals MVP: Ranidel de Ocampo (Talk 'N Text Tropang Texters)

PBA Commissioner's Cup chronology
- < 2014 2016 >

PBA conference chronology
- < 2014–15 Philippine 2015 Governors' >

The 2015 Philippine Basketball Association (PBA) Commissioner's Cup, also known as the 2015 PLDT Home TelPad-PBA Commissioner's Cup for sponsorship reasons, was the second conference of the 2014–15 PBA season. The tournament began on January 27, 2015 and ended on April 29, 2015. The tournament allows teams to hire foreign players or imports with a height limit of 6'9" for the top eight teams of the Philippine Cup, while the bottom four teams will be allowed to hire imports with no height limit.

== Format ==
The following format was observed for the duration of the conference:

- Single-round robin eliminations; 11 games per team; Teams are then seeded by basis on win–loss records.
- Top eight teams will advance to the quarterfinals. Ties are broken among head-to-head records of the tied teams.
- Quarterfinals:
  - QF1: #1 seed vs #8 seed (#1 seed twice-to-beat)
  - QF2: #2 seed vs #7 seed (#2 seed twice-to-beat)
  - QF3: #3 seed vs #6 seed (best-of-3 series)
  - QF4: #4 seed vs #5 seed (best-of-3 series)
- Semifinals (best-of-5 series):
  - SF1: QF1 vs. QF4 winners
  - SF2: QF2 vs. QF3 winners
- Finals (best-of-7 series)
  - Winners of the semifinals

== Elimination round ==
=== Team standings ===
Pos	Team	W	L	PCT	GB	Qualification
1	Rain or Shine Elasto Painters	8	3	.727 (Note: Head-to-head quotient: Rain or Shine 1.025, Talk 'N Text 1.010, Purefoods 0.969)	—	Twice-to-beat in the quarterfinals
2	Talk 'N Text Tropang Texters	8	3	.727	—	Twice-to-beat in the quarterfinals
3	Purefoods Star Hotshots	8	3	.727	—	Best-of-three quarterfinals
4	NLEX Road Warriors	6	5	.545 (Note: Head-to-head record: NLEX 1–0 Meralco)	2	Best-of-three quarterfinals
5	Meralco Bolts	6	5	.545	2	Best-of-three quarterfinals
6	Alaska Aces	5	6	.455 (Note: Head-to-head quotient: Alaska 1.021, Barako Bull 1.019, Barangay Ginebra 0.960)	3	Best-of-three quarterfinals
7	Barako Bull Energy	5	6	.455	3	Twice-to-win in the quarterfinals
8	Barangay Ginebra San Miguel	5	6	.455	3	Twice-to-win in the quarterfinals
9	San Miguel Beermen	4	7	.364 (Note: Head-to-head quotient: San Miguel 1.011, GlobalPort 0.995, Kia 0.994)	4	
10	GlobalPort Batang Pier	4	7	.364	4	
11	Kia Carnival	4	7	.364	4	
12	Blackwater Elite	3	8	.273	5	

Source: PBA.ph

=== Schedule ===
Team ╲ Game	1	2	3	4	5	6	7	8	9	10	11
Alaska	PF	NLEX	GP	SMB	ROS	BBE	KIA	BW	MER	TNT	BGSM
Barako Bull	BW	BGSM	KIA	TNT	GP	ALA	ROS	SMB	MER	PF	NLEX
Barangay Ginebra	MER	BBE	SMB	KIA	TNT	PF	BW	NLEX	ROS	GP	ALA
Blackwater	BBE	TNT	PF	SMB	NLEX	GP	BGSM	KIA	ALA	ROS	MER
GlobalPort	KIA	PUR	ROS	ALA	MER	BBE	BW	TNT	NLEX	BGSM	SMB
Kia	GP	MER	SMB	BBE	BGSM	PF	TNT	BW	ALA	NLEX	ROS
Meralco	BGSM	KIA	TNT	ROS	GP	SMB	NLEX	BBE	ALA	PF	BW
NLEX	ROS	ALA	PUR	BW	TNT	SMB	MER	BGSM	GP	KIA	BBE
Purefoods Star	GP	ALA	BW	NLEX	ROS	KIA	BGSM	SMB	TNT	BBE	MER
Rain or Shine	TNT	NLEX	GP	MER	PF	ALA	BBE	SMB	BGSM	BW	KIA
San Miguel	KIA	BGSM	BW	ALA	MER	NLEX	PF	BBE	ROS	TNT	GP
Talk 'N Text	ROS	BW	MER	BBE	BGSM	NLEX	KIA	GP	PF	SMB	ALA

= Win; = OT win; = Loss; = OT loss

=== Results ===
Team	ALA	BBE	BGSM	BW	GP	Kia	MER	NLEX	PUR	ROS	SMB	TNT
Alaska		91–93*	104–98	82–68	73–95	89–103	108–103**	96–95	88–108	89–99	107–100	93–101
Barako Bull			69–68	92–70	81–99	95–86	85–98	91–85	96–103	91–103	91–102	75–80
Barangay Ginebra				89–82	96–81	100–92	74–85	90–96	96–87	79–82	95–82	103–104
Blackwater					78–101	115–104	84–72	79–106	86–98	98–102	80–77	78–86
GlobalPort						100–89	84–86	81–94	70–83	98–104	94–106	88–96
Kia							80–90	86–102	95–84	99–119	88–78	106–103
Meralco								76–89	85–96	92–87	86–102	91–83
NLEX									62–87	91–96	100–93	96–98
Purefoods Star										71–78	113–105*	118–117***
Rain or Shine											114–129	86–89
San Miguel												93–113
Talk 'N Text												

Legend: Blue = left column team win; Red = top row team win.
Matches with lighter background shading were decided after overtime.

== Bracket ==
Quarterfinals
(#1 twice-to-beat)
1	Rain or Shine	92
8	Barangay Ginebra	91
(best-of-3)
4	NLEX	0
5	Meralco	2
(#2 twice-to-beat)
2	Talk 'N Text	127
7	Barako Bull	97
(best-of-3)
3	Purefoods Star	2
6	Alaska	0

Semifinals (best-of-5)
1	Rain or Shine	3
5	Meralco	0
2	Talk 'N Text	3
3	Purefoods Star	1

Finals (best-of-7)
1	Rain or Shine	3
2	Talk 'N Text	4

== Quarterfinals ==
=== (1) Rain or Shine vs. (8) Barangay Ginebra ===
March 28

Rain or Shine Elasto Painters 92, Barangay Ginebra San Miguel 91
Rain or Shine wins series in one game

Mall of Asia Arena, Pasay

=== (2) Talk 'N Text vs. (7) Barako Bull ===
March 28

Talk 'N Text Tropang Texters 127, Barako Bull Energy 97
Talk 'N Text wins series in one game

Mall of Asia Arena, Pasay

=== (3) Purefoods Star vs. (6) Alaska ===
March 27

Purefoods Star Hotshots 120, Alaska Aces 86

Smart Araneta Coliseum, Quezon City

March 29

Purefoods Star Hotshots 96, Alaska Aces 89
Purefoods Star wins series, 2–0

Smart Araneta Coliseum, Quezon City

=== (4) NLEX vs. (5) Meralco ===
March 27

NLEX Road Warriors 82, Meralco Bolts 97

Smart Araneta Coliseum, Quezon City

March 29

NLEX Road Warriors 85, Meralco Bolts 91 (OT)
Meralco wins series, 2–0

Smart Araneta Coliseum, Quezon City

== Semifinals ==
=== (1) Rain or Shine vs. (5) Meralco ===
March 31

Rain or Shine Elasto Painters 99, Meralco Bolts 86

Smart Araneta Coliseum, Quezon City

April 5

Rain or Shine Elasto Painters 92, Meralco Bolts 82

Smart Araneta Coliseum, Quezon City

April 7

Rain or Shine Elasto Painters 107, Meralco Bolts 98
Rain or Shine wins series, 3–0

Smart Araneta Coliseum, Quezon City

=== (2) Talk 'N Text vs. (3) Purefoods Star ===
April 1

Talk 'N Text Tropang Texters 94, Purefoods Star Hotshots 100

Smart Araneta Coliseum, Quezon City

April 6

Talk 'N Text Tropang Texters 93, Purefoods Star Hotshots 77

Smart Araneta Coliseum, Quezon City

April 9

Talk 'N Text Tropang Texters 111, Purefoods Star Hotshots 107

Smart Araneta Coliseum, Quezon City

April 11

Talk 'N Text Tropang Texters 79, Purefoods Star Hotshots 66
Talk 'N Text wins series, 3–1

Smart Araneta Coliseum, Quezon City

== Finals ==
April 15

Rain or Shine Elasto Painters 92, Talk 'N Text Tropang Texters 99

Mall of Asia Arena, Pasay

April 17

Rain or Shine Elasto Painters 116, Talk 'N Text Tropang Texters 108

Smart Araneta Coliseum, Quezon City

April 19

Rain or Shine Elasto Painters 109, Talk 'N Text Tropang Texters 97

Smart Araneta Coliseum, Quezon City

April 22

Rain or Shine Elasto Painters 92, Talk 'N Text Tropang Texters 99

Smart Araneta Coliseum, Quezon City

April 24

Rain or Shine Elasto Painters 94, Talk 'N Text Tropang Texters 103

Smart Araneta Coliseum, Quezon City

April 26

Rain or Shine Elasto Painters 101, Talk 'N Text Tropang Texters 93

Smart Araneta Coliseum, Quezon City

April 29

Rain or Shine Elasto Painters 119, Talk 'N Text Tropang Texters 121 (2OT)
Talk 'N Text wins series, 4–3

Smart Araneta Coliseum, Quezon City

== Awards ==
=== Conference ===
- Best Player of the Conference: Jayson Castro (Talk 'N Text Tropang Texters)
- Bobby Parks Best Import of the Conference: Wayne Chism (Rain or Shine Elasto Painters)
- Finals MVP: Ranidel de Ocampo (Talk 'N Text Tropang Texters)

=== Players of the Week ===
Week	Player	Ref.
January 27 – February 1	Chico Lanete (Barako Bull Energy)	
February 1–8	Paul Lee (Rain or Shine Elasto Painters)	
February 9–15	Jayson Castro (Talk 'N Text Tropang Texters)	
February 15–22	Terrence Romeo (GlobalPort Batang Pier)	
February 23 – March 1	James Yap (Purefoods Star Hotshots)	
March 3–15	Arwind Santos (San Miguel Beermen)	
March 16–22	Ranidel De Ocampo (Talk 'N Text Tropang Texters)	
March 23–29	Joe Devance (Purefoods Star Hotshots); Mark Barroca (Purefoods Star Hotshots)	
March 30 – April 5	Paul Lee (Rain or Shine Elasto Painters); Jericho Cruz (Rain or Shine Elasto Painters)	

== Imports ==
The following is the list of imports, which had played for their respective teams at least once, with the returning imports in italics. Highlighted are the imports who stayed with their respective teams for the whole conference.

Team	Name	Debuted	Last game	Record
Alaska Aces	D. J. Covington	February 3 (vs. Purefoods Star)	February 17 (vs. San Miguel)	2–2
Alaska Aces	Damion James	February 20 (vs. Rain or Shine)	March 29 (vs. Purefoods Star)	3–6
Barako Bull Energy	Solomon Alabi	January 28 (vs. Blackwater)	March 28 (vs. Talk 'N Text)	5–7
Barangay Ginebra San Miguel	Michael Dunigan	January 27 (vs. Meralco)	March 28 (vs. Rain or Shine)	5–7
Blackwater Elite	No Import	January 28 (vs. Barako Bull)		0–1
Blackwater Elite	Marcus Douthit	February 1 (vs. Talk 'N Text)	March 25 (vs. Meralco)	3–7
GlobalPort Batang Pier	CJ Leslie	January 27 (vs. Kia)	February 10 (vs. Alaska)	2–2
GlobalPort Batang Pier	Calvin Warner	February 15 (vs. Meralco)	March 1 (vs. Talk 'N Text)	2–2
GlobalPort Batang Pier	Derrick Caracter	March 15 (vs. NLEX)	March 24 (vs. San Miguel)	0–3
Kia Carnival	Peter John Ramos	January 27 (vs. GlobalPort)	March 22 (vs. Rain or Shine)	4–7
Meralco Bolts	Josh Davis	January 27 (vs. Barangay Ginebra)	April 5 (vs. Rain or Shine)	8–7
Meralco Bolts	No Import	April 7 (vs. Rain or Shine)		0–1
NLEX Road Warriors	Al Thornton	February 3 (vs. Rain or Shine)	March 29 (vs. Meralco)	6–7
Purefoods Star Hotshots	Marqus Blakely	January 30 (vs. GlobalPort)	February 7 (vs. Blackwater)	3–0
Purefoods Star Hotshots	Daniel Orton	February 11 (vs. NLEX)	February 18 (vs. Kia)	1–2
Purefoods Star Hotshots	Denzel Bowles	February 22 (vs. Brgy. Ginebra)	April 11 (vs. Talk 'N Text)	7–4
Rain or Shine Elasto Painters	Rick Jackson	January 28 (vs. Talk 'N Text)	February 14 (vs. Purefoods Star)	3–2
Rain or Shine Elasto Painters	Wayne Chism	February 20 (vs. Alaska)	April 29 (vs. Talk 'N Text)	12–5
San Miguel Beermen	Ronald Roberts	February 4 (vs. Kia)	February 17 (vs. Alaska)	0–4
San Miguel Beermen	Arizona Reid	February 21 (vs. Meralco)	March 24 (vs. GlobalPort)	4–3
Talk 'N Text Tropang Texters	Richard Howell	January 28 (vs. Rain or Shine)	February 15 (vs. Barangay Ginebra)	4–1
Talk 'N Text Tropang Texters	Ivan Johnson	February 20 (vs. NLEX)	April 29 (vs. Rain or Shine)	12–6

=== Import handicapping ===
Team	Philippine Cup standings			Import height limit
Team	W	L	%	Import height limit
San Miguel Beermen	9	2	.818	6'9"
Rain or Shine Elasto Painters	9	2	.818	6'9"
Alaska Aces	8	3	.727	6'9"
Talk 'N Text Tropang Texters	8	3	.727	6'9"
Barangay Ginebra San Miguel	6	5	.545	6'9"
Meralco Bolts	6	5	.545	6'9"
Purefoods Star Hotshots	6	5	.545	6'9"
GlobalPort Batang Pier	5	6	.455	6'9"
Barako Bull Energy	4	7	.364	unlimited
NLEX Road Warriors	4	7	.364	unlimited
Kia Carnival	1	10	.091	unlimited
Blackwater Elite	0	11	.000	unlimited
