= Manila Clasico =

Basketball rivalry

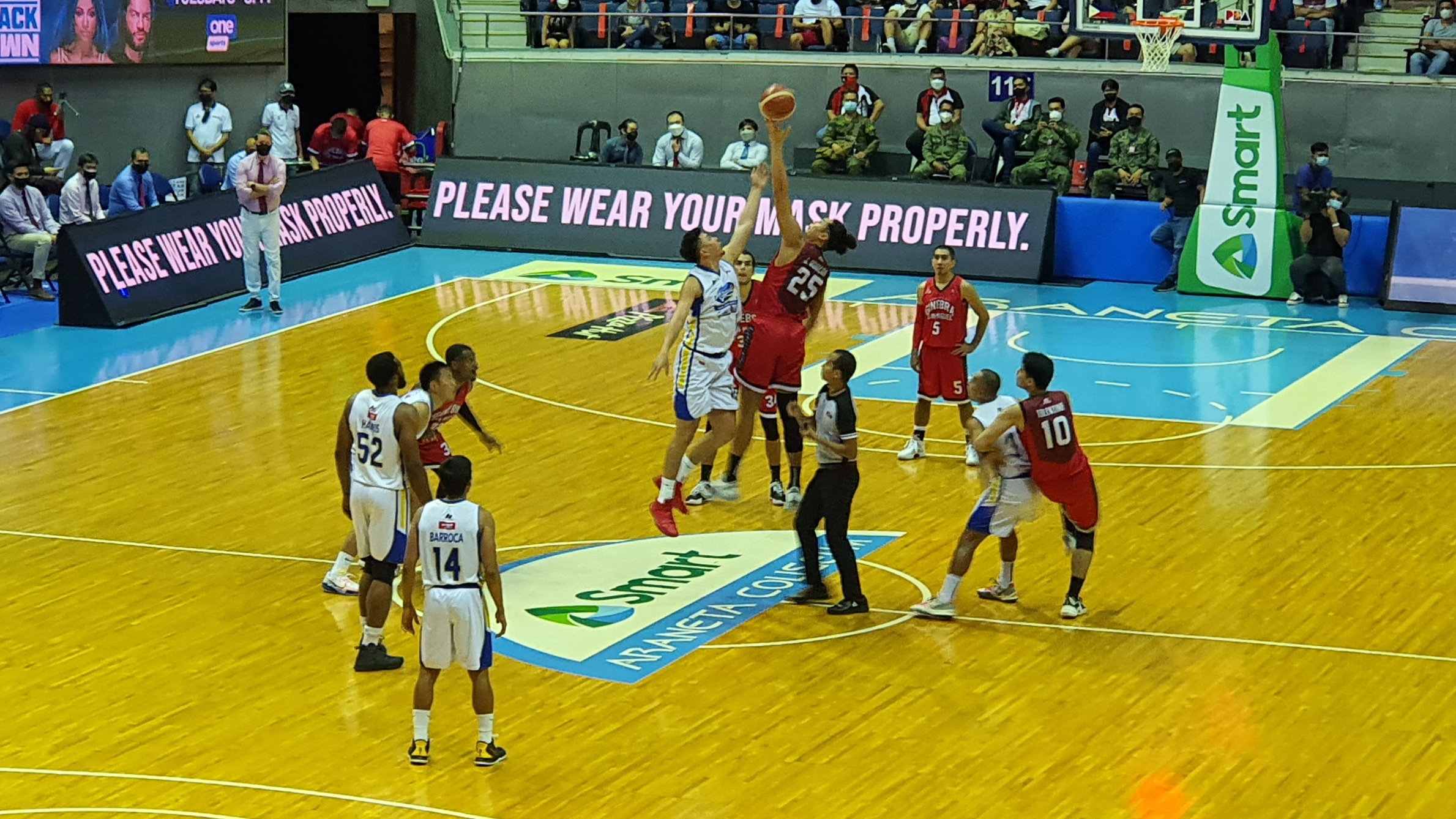
- Tipoff between Ian Sangalang of Magnolia Hotshots and Japeth Aguilar of Barangay Ginebra during their 2021 PBA Governors' Cup elimination round game.
- Teams: Barangay Ginebra San Miguel; Magnolia Chicken Timplados Hotshots
- First meeting: April 5, 1988; Purefoods 116, Ginebra 110, ULTRA
- Latest meeting: October 11, 2026; Magnolia 112, Barangay Ginebra 93 Smart Araneta Coliseum
- Next meeting: TBD

Statistics
- Total meetings: 211 meetings
- All-time record: 107–104 (.507), Magnolia
- Largest victory: 39 (157–118), Purefoods
- Longest win streak: 8, Purefoods (April 20, 1993 – February 28, 1995); 7, Barangay Ginebra (February 19, 2017 – October 28, 2018)
- Current win streak: 2, Magnolia

History
PBA finals
- Series record: 1–1 (Tied)
- Win–loss record: 5–5 (Tied)
- 1988 All-Filipino: Añejo won, 3–1
- 1997 All-Filipino: Purefoods won, 4–2
PBA Playoffs
- Series record: 8–6 (Barangay Ginebra leads)
- Win–loss record: 21–18 (Barangay Ginebra leads)
- 1989 Rein FB: Añejo won, 1–0
- 1999 Govs QF: Purefoods won, 1–0
- 2001 All-Fil QF: Barangay Ginebra won, 2–0
- 2012 Comms 2S: Barangay Ginebra won, 1–0
- 2012 Comms SF: B-Meg won, 3–1
- 2012 Govs FB: B-Meg won, 1–0
- 2013–14 Phil SF: San Mig Super Coffee won, 4–3
- 2015–16 Phil QF: Barangay Ginebra won, 1–0
- 2016–17 Phil SF: Barangay Ginebra won, 4–3
- 2018 Govs SF: Magnolia won, 3–1
- 2019 Phil QF: Magnolia won, 2–1
- 2019 Comms QF: Barangay Ginebra won, 2–0
- 2022–23 Comms SF: Barangay Ginebra won, 3–1
- 2024 Phil QF: Barangay Ginebra won, 1–0

Manila Clasico is a Philippine Basketball Association (PBA) rivalry between the Barangay Ginebra San Miguel and Magnolia Chicken Timplados Hotshots, two of the most successful and most popular teams in the league. It is also a rivalry between two San Miguel Corporation teams (also known as sister teams). The former represents the Ginebra San Miguel franchise while the latter carries the San Miguel Pure Foods franchise.

Matchups between the two teams, whether in the elimination round or in the playoffs, have regularly drawn huge crowds to the venues, high television ratings, and social media engagement.

== Overview ==
The two teams have won a total of 29 championships: the Ginebra franchise have 15, and the Purefoods franchise have 14. However, as of the end of the 2022–23 PBA season, the Ginebra and Purefoods franchises have only met in the finals twice in the 32 seasons they have been together in the league. Head-to-head, they have an even PBA finals record, 1–1.

Season	Conference	Champion	Runner-up	Series	Winning Coach
1988	All-Filipino	Añejo Rum 65ers	Purefoods Hotdogs	3–1	Robert Jaworski
1997	All-Filipino	Purefoods Corned Beef Cowboys	Gordon's Gin Boars	4–2	Eric Altamirano

== History ==
While the rivalry traces all the way back to the 1980s, the name by which it is now well-known only came up in 2012, when online sports editor Jaemark Tordecilla called the Ginebra-Purefoods rivalry as the Philippine basketball equivalent of the El Clásico football rivalry between Real Madrid and FC Barcelona. Tordecilla said that the rivalry “has been one of Philippine sports’ most underrated phenomena, because media has rarely hyped up the matchup” before. But the popularity of the two teams, their history, and the profiles of their original fanbase made the rivalry special and endure through the years.

=== Jaworski versus Fernandez: the beginning of the rivalry ===
The rivalry is said to have begun even before Purefoods entered the PBA. Ginebra playing coach Robert Jaworski had a simmering feud with former Toyota teammate Ramon Fernandez. The hostilities between two of the biggest stars in the league during that time started to peak in the 1986 PBA season. Jaworski's Ginebra and Fernandez's Tanduay Rhum Makers battled each other in the All-Filipino finals. Fernandez led Tanduay to a 3–1 victory against Ginebra, but Jaworski would get his revenge when his team ended Tanduay Rhum's grandslam bid with a 151–130 rout in the season's third conference. Since then, whenever teams of Jaworski and Fernandez meet, the fans anticipate greater physicality and intensity because of their apparent hatred for one another. The Tanduay PBA franchise was eventually bought by Purefoods in 1988.

But the cold war between “The Living Legend” and “El Presidente” just served as starting point for the enmity. In the 80s, Jaworski was criticised for perceived “dirty play.” He was viewed as a polarising figure. Meanwhile, Purefoods began to bring through players such as Jojo Lastimosa, Jerry Codiñera, and Alvin Patrimonio. This led to a rivalry due to the teams' differing ikages and styles, with Jaworski's supporters identifying with the lower class (masa) and Purefood with the upper class (sosyal), and the rivalry was described as being between the “bad guys” and the “good boys.” Purefoods dislodged San Miguel as the second most supported team in the league, stoking the rivalry further.

Ginebra and Purefoods first met on April 5, 1988, with Purefoods playing coach Fernandez matching coaching skills with Ginebra counterpart Jaworski. Purefoods won the match, 116–110, despite falling down by 16 points in the third quarter. Fernandez was voted best player of the game. The squads again faced each other in the semifinals of the 1988 Open Conference. Purefoods’ 111–109 overtime win sent the Hotdogs into the finals against San Miguel Beer, while a loss would have meant another playoff game with Ginebra for the second finals berth. After this game, some frustrated Ginebra fans at the gallery section pelted the court with plastic cups and coins.

During their first meeting in an All-Filipino tournament, Añejo lost a 19-point third-quarter lead and was defeated by Ginebra 114–110, marking Alvin Patrimonio's first game against a Ginebra roster. On August 18, 1988, Purefoods overcame a 102–106 deficit in the final 51 seconds with a 7–0 run to win 109–106, achieving a television viewer share of 53.1 percent.

The two franchises battled for the first time in a PBA finals in the 1988 All Filipino. The Rum Masters won the title against a Purefoods crew that was without their main man, Fernandez, for most part of the series. Starting Game Two of the 1988 All-Filipino championship series, the Purefoods management decided to bench Fernandez. Purefoods eventually lost the series in four games. Fernandez, who was accused of dropping the games, was eventually traded to San Miguel in exchange for veteran center Abet Guidaben.

=== Tough Ginebra squad versus Patrimonio-led Purefoods ===
After Fernandez's departure from Purefoods, “The Captain” Alvin Patrimonio became the new go-to guy and leader of the team. The rivalry with Ginebra was sustained by some compelling stories and notable occurrences during games involving the two teams. In an April 4, 1989 game where Purefoods dominated Añejo, Jaworski sneaked in a punch on Lastimosa in retaliation on a previous play where he got tripped by Lastimosa.

Another memorable game was the one played on October 24, 1989. The game, which featured the team exchanging rallies throughout the first three quarters, went down the wire until the Hotdogs lost focus in the final two minutes. Purefoods coach Baby Dalupan was furious after the game, blaming the referees over faulty officiating.

On November 21, 1989, Ginebra showed one of the most glaring examples of its “Never Say Die spirit”. With 21 seconds left in the game and the Hotdogs up, 134–130, Añejo score a quick two. Then, import Carlos Briggs stole the ball from Dindo Pumaren and completed a three-point play off a foul by Lastimosa, capping a stirring comeback and a 135–134 victory for Jaworski's charges. Five nights later, fans supporting both teams got into a fight after Añejo salvaged a controversial one-point win over the import-less Purefoods squad. The Hotdogs’ import Dexter Shouse bolted the team a day before the all-important playoff game for the last finals berth of the season's Third Conference.

On November 8, 1990, Jaworski committed a punching foul on Purefoods import Robert Paul Rose when he let go of a flying elbow with seconds left of an already won ballgame by the Hotdogs. Jaworski was fined and suspended for one game. With Añejo getting eliminated from the 1990 Reinforced Conference by its loss to Purefoods, the one-game suspension on Jaworski took effect the following season.

On May 2, 1991, Ginebra San Miguel scored 16 unanswered points in the first quarter of a game against Purefoods. The team that got the early lead never looked back and won, 126–108. Purefoods played importless against Ginebra once again after Richard Hollis abandoned the team just before the game.

Some of the interesting features of the rivalry also included the popularity battle between Añejo's Dondon Ampalayo and Purefoods’ Patrimonio, and the fierce one-on-one matchups between Patrimonio and Chito Loyzaga in the paint; among many others.

=== Lull and revival ===
The rivalry somehow wavered in the early to mid-90s as Purefoods, led by the then dominant Patrimonio, went on to win several championships while Ginebra struggled and found themselves languishing in the bottom of the team standings. It is no surprise that it was during this time that Purefoods recorded the largest winning margin of the rivalry; the Hotdogs trampling the Gins, 157–118, on March 10, 1992. In a span of nearly two years, Ginebra also went winless against Purefoods, which strung together eight consecutive victories against their rivals. Still, there were some note-worthy encounters between the two ballclubs during that period. One of which was the Ginebra win that ended its losing skid against the Hotdogs. In that game, former Purefoods player Vince Hizon carried the Gins with his 25 points, 10 rebounds, and six assists. Another was a game played on October 6, 1992, wherein Ginebra overcame a 19-point deficit to snatch a win, 140–134, in overtime.

In 1996, with the acquisition of rookie big man Marlou Aquino and free agent point guard Bal David, Ginebra, still handled by playing coach Jaworksi, found itself competitive once more. Consequently, the rivalry also regained vitality. In 1997, a coin-throwing incident marred a game between the old rivals when a controversial blocking foul was called against Ginebra's Vince Hizon on a drive by Purefoods’ center Jerry Codiñera.

In the 1997 PBA All-Filipino Cup, the two teams met for only the second time in the PBA finals. Purefoods won the series convincingly in six games. In Game Six of the 1997 PBA All-Filipino Cup finals, Alvin Patrimonio scored almost half of his team's total points (40 of 82) to lead his Purefoods Corned Beef Cowboys to the title over the Gordon's Gin Boars. Aside from notching his season-high in points, “The Captain” also grabbed 11 rebounds and dished four assists.

In the quarterfinals of the 2001 All-Filipino Cup, Barangay Ginebra faced Purefoods, which had a twice-to-beat advantage. The Kings were able to defeat the Hotdogs twice to enter the semifinals. Both games were won by a single point (77–76, 70–69). In the first game, it was Vergel Meneses who hit the game-winning layup for Ginebra with eight seconds left. Ronald Magtulis was the hero of the second game after he nailed a fallaway jumper off a miss by Bal David with 1.2 ticks left.

=== Sibling rivalry ===
A year before the Purefoods franchise entered the PBA, San Miguel Corporation (SMC) acquired a 70-percent stake in La Tondeña Incorporada, the company that owned the Ginebra PBA franchise. Consequently, the team went under the SMC umbrella, which owns another PBA team in San Miguel Beer. Since then, Ginebra and San Miguel became sister teams.

In 2001, SMC also bought Purefoods-Hormel Corporation, which was previously owned by the Ayala Corporation. A problem ensued because of a league rule prohibiting a company to own more than two teams (SMC already had San Miguel and Ginebra). The options were disbanding the Purefoods franchise, or the Ayala Corporation retaining the team under a new banner. Eventually, the PBA Board of Governors adjusted the rule and allowed Purefoods to stay in the league.

As a result, fierce rivals Ginebra and Purefoods also became sister teams. While some feared that the Ginebra-Purefoods games would never be as exciting as before, many fans and sports analysts thought otherwise, citing previous games played by sister squads Ginebra and San Miguel. True enough, fans continue to look forward to Ginebra and Purefoods encounters, knowing that the rivalry between these two sister teams remains as fierce as ever.

=== Caguioa versus Yap: the face of the PBA ===
In December 1998, Jaworski left Ginebra to pursue a political career, making Purefoods’ Patrimonio the face of the league. His departure from the team that he led resulted in the team, Ginebra struggling to perform. In 2001, Ginebra brought in the charismatic Mark Caguioa, a virtually unknown player from the rookie draft. The man who was eventually called “The Spark” caught the attention of millions of the Ginebra fans and became their new darling because of his talent, will, and passion for the game.

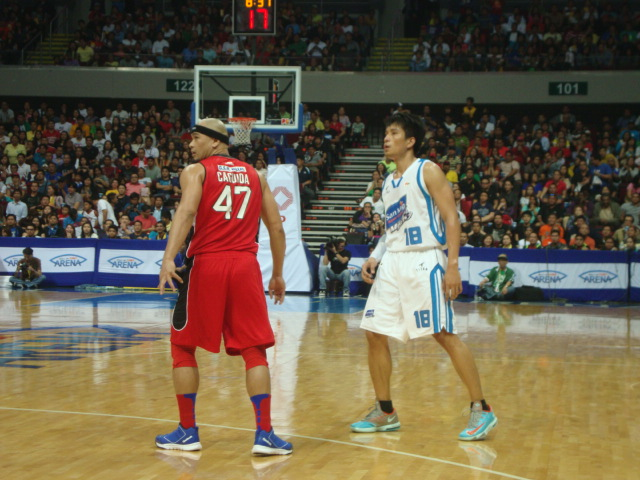
Mark Caguioa of Barangay Ginebra guards James Yap of San Mig Coffee during their PBA Philippine Cup semifinals series.

Caguioa's entry also came at a time when Patrimonio was close to retirement and the league needed a new face to carry the PBA banner. Caguioa was fit and ready for that role. With Patrimonio slowing down, it was Purefoods’ turn to look for its new franchise player. In 2004, that player turned out to be James Yap, who was drafted second overall by the team in the 2004 draft. Unlike Caguioa when he entered the league, Yap was already a well-known player, being a superstar in the collegiate and amateur ranks. He also appeared to be the perfect replacement for Patrimonio – he was popular, equally good-looking, and had the wholesome persona that the Hotdogs were looking for. Yap's popularity surged even more when he tied the knot with celebrity actress Kris Aquino and found himself being adored by the masses, including the non-basketball watchers.`,

For the decade, two players in the league doubled as the franchise players of Ginebra and Purefoods, just like in the playing years of Jaworski and Patrimonio. After a playoff game wherein Yap made the winning basket, Coach Tim Cone of San Mig Super Coffee remarked, “In the old days it would’ve come down to Alvin Patrimonio making a big post move. But nowadays James hits a big shot. Well, I guess, Manila Clasico, it should come down to the last possession. And it did today. It came down to a James Yap three-point shot.” For San Mig Coffee Team Governor Rene Pardo, Yap is the face of the PBA, representing what Jaworski was to the pro league in the seventies and eighties, and Patrimonio in the nineties.

So far in their respective careers, Yap has been named the league's Most Valuable Player (MVP) twice, while Caguioa has been chosen as the MVP once. Both have also been part of the Mythical Teams several times, consequently becoming competitors against each other for the top individual award. Comparison between the two players thus seems inevitable. As to who between the two should be considered as more popular, more talented, and more deserving to be called the “face of the PBA” remains a debate between the fanbases of both clubs. During games between the two teams, the pro-Ginebra crowd would boo Yap, and vice versa: the pro-San Mig Coffee crowd would also boo Caguioa, whenever either touches the ball.

During its off-season buildup for 2016-17, the Star Hotshots traded Yap to Rain or Shine for superstar guard Paul Lee, marking the end of an era for the Purefoods franchise.

=== Ginebra’s playoff heartbreaks ===
Winning their first three playoff series during the Caguioa-Yap era, the Purefoods teams were responsible for eliminating Barangay Ginebra from title contention.

In the 2012 Commissioner's Cup, Yap and his B-Meg Llamados played against a Caguioa-less Barangay Ginebra team in the semifinals. It was actually Yap who accidentally hit Caguioa in the right eye during an elimination round game that led to the Ginebra topgunner being sidelined for the rest of the conference.

During one of the games of the series, struggling Ginebra import Jackson Vroman lost his cool and shoved B-Meg center Yancy de Ocampo in the face. The Ginebra import was called for a flagrant foul penalty 1 only, dodging what would have merited an automatic ejection and possibly a one-game suspension.

B-Meg won the series against Ginebra, and eventually the championship in what was considered as one of the greatest Game Seven victories in PBA history.

In the 2012 Governors’ Cup, B-Meg defeated Ginebra twice in crucial games: the first in the semifinal round, and the second in the playoff game for the last Finals slot. In that game played on July 20, 2012, B-Meg's Peter June Simon nailed a putback off a missed attempt by import Marqus Blakely with 2.5 seconds left in the gameclock to lift his team over Barangay Ginebra, 74–72.

The rivals met once more in an epic seven-game semifinals of the 2013–14 PBA Philippine Cup. In the dying seconds of Game 1 of the 2013-14 Philippine Cup Semifinals, the inbound pass of Barangay Ginebra's Mac Baracael was stolen by Joe Devance, after which San Mig Super Coffee (Purefoods) guard Mark Barroca quickly ran down the court and sank the go-ahead one-hander to give his team an 85–83 win. In the fifth game of the series, James Yap, with his team down by one in the last 22.4 seconds, scored a three-pointer to tow his team to victory. Yap made up for the last missed three-pointer he shot in Game 4 that could have extended that game into overtime. In that same game, forward Mac Baracael of Barangay Ginebra committed a closed-fist foul against center Rafi Reavis of San Mig Super Coffee. Only a regular foul was called against Baracael, which allowed him to play the do-or-die Game 6 for his team.

In Game 6, former Ginebra playing-coach and legend Robert Jaworski fired up the players of his former team when he visited the locker room at halftime. Ginebra rallied from a double-digit first half deficit to win the game and force a deciding Game 7. But in the do-or-die match, San Mig's starting backcourt duo of Yap and Simon dropped 30 and 28 points, respectively, to finally put away their rivals. San Mig, which struggled early in the tournament starting with a 1-5 record, once again eliminated Barangay Ginebra, which even topped the elimination round. The Mixers went on to win the championship, and later, became the season's Grand Slam winner.

=== Under the triangle ===
In 2011, Tim Cone, the long-time head coach of the Alaska Aces, cut his ties with the team that he led to 13 championship titles, including a rare Grand Slam. Cone became successful with the Aces running his triangle offense, a brainchild of NBA coach Phil Jackson and Tex Winter which provides for ample spacing that puts everyone in scoring position.

Days after Cone announced his resignation, he was named as the new head coach of the B-Meg Llamados. He brought along two players of his Grand Slam team — Jeffrey Cariaso and Johnny Abarrientos — to B-Meg to serve as his assistant coaches. The two assisted Cone in teaching the new system to B-Meg players.

After a disappointing playoff loss to Powerade in his first conference with the Purefoods franchise, Cone steered the team to the 2012 Commissioner's Cup title. The team finished as runners up in the following tournament and settled for third in the succeeding two conferences, before dominating the league as the San Mig Super Coffee Mixers by winning four consecutive championships, as well as the Grand Slam in the 2013–14 season.

On the other hand, Barangay Ginebra, although competitive, continued to fail in advancing to the Finals. A string of playoff exits and disappointments prompted team management to pluck Cariaso out of San Mig Coffee at the start of the 2014 Governors' Cup. A disciple of Cone in Alaska and San Mig Coffee, Cariaso said he wanted to mix the triangle with the run-and-gun offense that Ginebra has been employing. Ginebra started the conference with three straight wins but it was no less than Cone and rival San Mig Coffee who dealt the team its first loss with Cariaso at the helm. Ginebra failed to advance deep into the playoffs again, and team officials and players conceded that the team needed more time to adjust to its new offensive system.

However, before the start of the 2015 PBA Commissioner's Cup, Ginebra dropped Cariaso, abandoned the triangle system, and went back to its familiar run-and-gun system with returning head coach Ato Agustin, and later with collegiate champion coach Frankie Lim.

An interesting plot twist to the rivalry was Cone's transfer in the following offseason from the Star Hotshots (Purefoods) to Ginebra, where the multi-titled coach is expected to reintroduce the triangle. Star's Joe Devance, a player very familiar with Cone's triangle having played the system in Alaska and Purefoods, soon reunited with the veteran coach in Ginebra through a four-team trade. The Hotshots, on the other hand, looked to implement the run-and-gun system under its new head coach, Jason Webb. With their new coaches, Star won the first Manila Clasico game, which saw Barangay Ginebra trailing by as much as 31 points and their trademark comeback attempt coming up short in the final quarter.

Barangay Ginebra got back at Star in the quarterfinal knockouts of the same tournament by winning a “Christmas Clasico” in vintage Ginebra style. Star was up by as much as 18 points in the fourth quarter but Barangay Ginebra made a furious run in the final minutes to force overtime. In the extension period, the game was tied at 89 before LA Tenorio sank in a buzzer-beating three pointer to win it for Ginebra, 92–89.

In an elimination round game of the 2016 Governors' Cup, Star built a 17-point lead in the first half, only to lose in another classic Ginebra comeback. Barangay Ginebra turned things around in the second half, building their own 19-point lead during the fourth quarter and winning by 13, 116–103. Tension between the two teams continued even after the final buzzer, with forwards Marc Pingris and Dave Marcelo jawing at each other, and Star Team Manager Alvin Patrimonio and retired player Peter Aguilar (father of Ginebra forward Japeth) exchanging heated words.

=== Changing of the guards ===
In the 2015 PBA draft, Barangay Ginebra selected do-it-all guard Scottie Thompson, whom Cone felt "might turn out to be special" and could take the place of aging veteran guards and former MVPs Mark Caguioa and Jayjay Helterbrand. By the end of his rookie season, Thompson had made the PBA All-Rookie Team and was instrumental in Barangay Ginebra's conquest of the 2016 PBA Governors' Cup that ended an eight-year title drought for the team.

As Barangay Ginebra ascended back to the top, Star, on the other hand, struggled for most part of the season under Webb. In the following offseason, Chito Victolero was named new head coach while Webb was designated as team consultant. Star also made the biggest deal in the offseason buildup when it traded long-time franchise cornerstone James Yap for guard Paul Lee. It also picked up NCAA top point guard Jio Jalalon in the 2016 PBA draft.

Jalalon and Thompson, though friends off the court, are fierce rivals since college; both of them notching triple-doubles in games. They played their first PBA playoff series against each other right in Jalalon's first conference in the pro league. Thompson, who averaged 8 rebounds, helped his Ginebra team defeat Star in that semifinal series, overcoming a 0–2 deficit before winning in seven games. After getting defeated in the final two games of the series, the Hotshots would lose five more consecutive games to Ginebra, extending their losing skid to seven games. The Hotshots, now carrying the Magnolia brand, arrested the slide with a win in Game 1 of their 2018 PBA Governors' Cup Best-of-5 Semifinals match-up. Magnolia went on to beat Ginebra in the series, 3–1, and put an end to their rivals' two-year title reign in the Governors' Cup. Barangay Ginebra was also beaten by Magnolia in the quarterfinals of the succeeding Philippine Cup tournament, losing the back-to-back Manila Clasico playoff series to the Hotshots.

Over time, another Lastimosa (not Jojo) and Abarrientos (not Magnolia assistant coach Johnny) were featured in Manila Clasico upon the retirement of the old hardcourt heroes decades ago. Hotshot Jerom Lastimosa shot the first four-point field goal in the "Christmas Clasico" that helped Magnolia to advance strongly in the first quarter until reaching a 72-52 lead against RJ Abarrientos and Ginebra. True to its never-say-die spirit, however, the new point guard of Ginebra cut their 20-point deficit by leading an avalanche of three-pointers in the second half before Thompson hit the buzzer-beating corner three-pointed at the buzzer to break the 92-all score and win the last Clasico, 95-92, on December 25, 2024.

== Championship battles ==
It has been observed that while the two teams have met in the PBA finals just twice in the last 32 seasons, and playoff encounters between them have been few and far between, the Ginebra-Purefoods rivalry has remained the most heated in the league.

=== 1988 PBA All-Filipino Conference finals ===
The 1988 PBA All-Filipino Conference finals between the Añejo Rum 65 Rum Masters and the Purefoods Hotdogs was one of the most hyped championship series in PBA history. People saw it as the battle of former Toyota teammates and archrivals Robert Jaworski and Ramon Fernandez. It turned out, however, that the core of the Tanduay team sans Fernandez but with its top five rookies would carry the Purefoods squad in the series.

In Game One, Joey Loyzaga led the Rum Masters to victory as he fired five three-point shots, all of them on crucial occasions and quelling as many Purefoods uprising. Alvin Patrimonio led all scorers but his 34 points went to naught as the Hotdogs fell, 105–111. In Game Two, despite the benching of Fernandez, the Hotdogs recovered with a 117–112 win. Jojo Lastimosa topscored for Purefoods with 27 points. In Game Three, the Hotdogs’ Totoy Marquez, who led all scorers in that game with 30, missed on his last attempt to allow the Rum Masters to escape with a two-point victory, 112–110. In the series-clinching Game Four for Añejo, Jaworski, who scored 28 points, followed up his own miss to send the game into overtime. The Rum Masters dominated the extension period, 16–5, completing a come-from-behind win over the Hotdogs, who even led by as much as 19 points in the third quarter. Añejo bagged Game Four, 135–124, and the championship title, winning the series, 3–1.

=== 1997 PBA All-Filipino Cup finals ===
It was only after almost nine years that the two teams finally met again in a championship series. The championship matchup was a fitting conclusion to the tournament with Ginebra (then carrying the Gordon's Gin Boars name) and Purefoods ending as the top two teams after the elimination and semifinal rounds.

It was expected to be a tight series but Games One and Two turned out to be blowouts for the Purefoods Corned Beef Cowboys. Still led by Patrimonio, the Cowboys took the first game, 103–90, and the second game, 91–73. So bad was Gordon's Gin's beating that playing coach Jaworski remarked after Game One that he has “never seen [his] team play as horrible.” The Boars finally salvaged a win in Game Three, 92–83; but Purefoods easily gained control of the series in Game Four, winning 94–84. Gordon's Gin managed to stay alive in the series, escaping with a 96–95 win in the fifth game of the Best of 7. In Game Six, Patrimonio exploded for 40 points, adding 11 boards and four assists, leading his team to an 82–73 victory. With the win, Patrimonio and his Purefoods team finally got their long-awaited revenge on Ginebra, winning the 1997 PBA All-Filipino Cup title, 4–2.

== Teams’ popularity ==
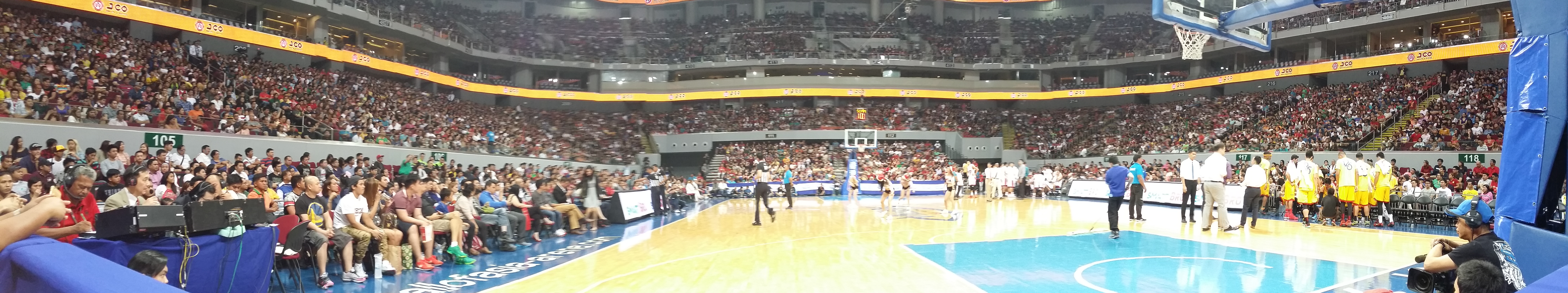
Panorama view of the Mall of Asia Arena during the Manila Clasico quarterfinal game between Star and Ginebra on December 25, 2015.

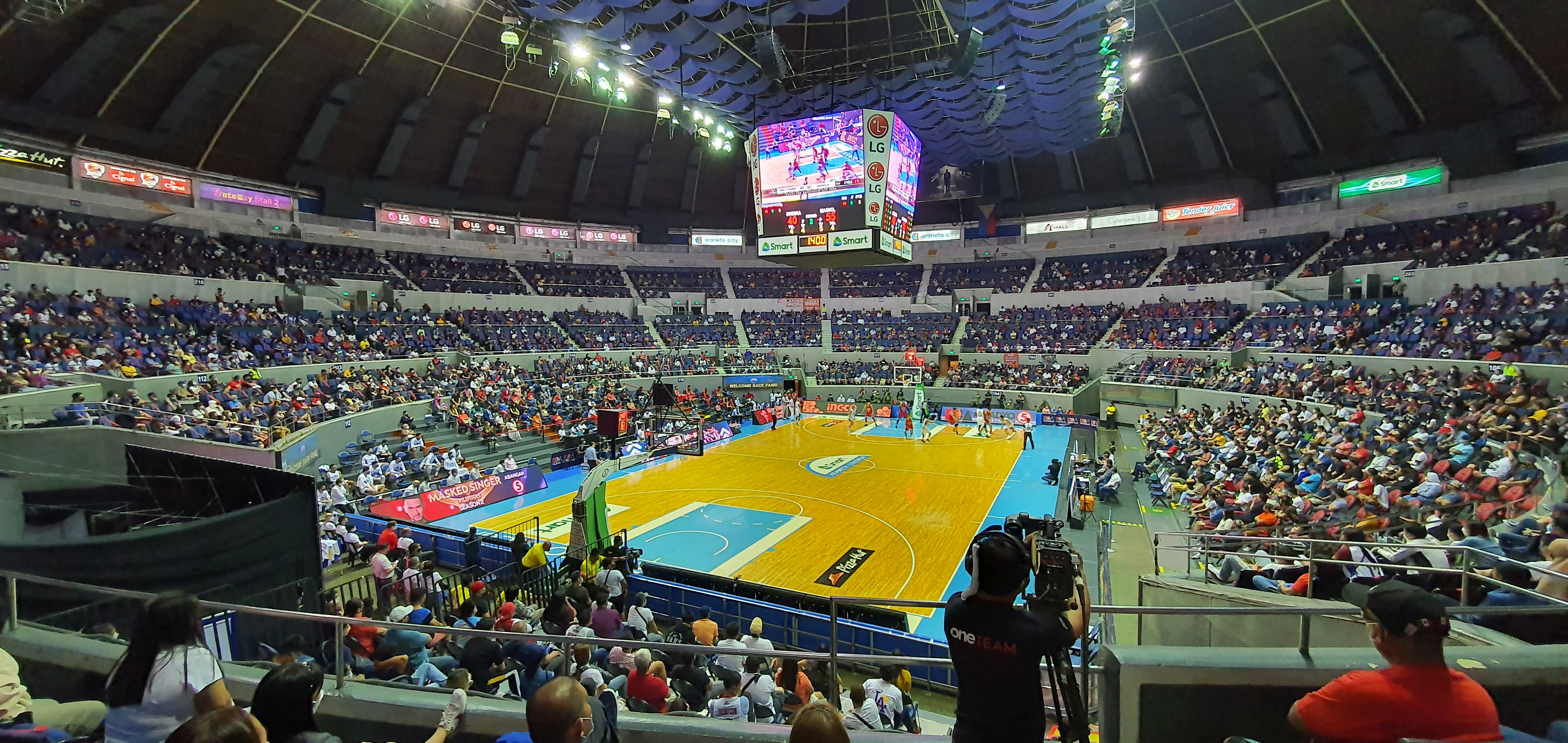
A photo inside the Smart Araneta Coliseum during the 2021 PBA Governors' elimination round game between the Barangay Ginebra San Miguel and the Magnolia Pambansang Manok Hotshots. This is the first time that the two teams played with a live audience since the COVID-19 pandemic began in March 2020.

For many years, Ginebra has owned the distinction of being the most popular team in the league. Its popularity can be traced to the recruitment of the backcourt tandem of Robert Jaworski and Francis Arnaiz, both former Toyota players. Fans of Toyota followed the two stalwarts to Ginebra after the Toyota team disbanded in 1983. The team also became a crowd favorite because of its “Never Say Die” attitude, which has allowed it to snatch come-from-behind wins many times. Even after Jaworski's departure as coach at the end of the 1998 season, somehow, Jaworski's legacy lingered and the fans remained loyal to the team. Ginebra's games remained the highest raters on television, regardless of the team's performance.

In 2008, however, a survey showed that Purefoods shares the honor of league's most popular ballclub with Ginebra. It appeared that Ginebra was the most popular team among men, while Purefoods was the most popular among women. Also, Ginebra was more popular in Metro Manila and Luzon and in classes ABC, while Purefoods was more popular in Visayas and Mindanao and in class D. The two teams were tied for most supporters in class E.

Ginebra fans were furious at the results of the survey, arguing that their team is still unrivaled in terms of popularity and crowd support. But the arguments only served to fan the heated rivalry between the two teams with the largest fanbases in Philippine professional basketball.

Results of a more recent survey showed that Ginebra is still the league's most popular team and draws the highest television ratings, followed closely by the Purefoods/B-Meg Llamados. Officials of the two teams agree. Barangay Ginebra Team Governor Alfrancis Chua commented that during Manila Clasico games, the number of fans cheering for both teams are almost equal, with Ginebra getting a slight edge. San Mig Coffee Team Governor Rene Pardo agreed that his team was still second to Ginebra in terms of popularity and following. “...[W]e have strengthened our hold on very strong number two and we’re biting at the back of Ginebra, which is still hands down the most popular [team] in the country,” he said. “Purefoods is really closing in on Ginebra in terms of fanbase,” PBA Commissioner Chito Salud also confirmed.

== Additional notes ==
- The two teams did not meet in the 1994 PBA Governors' Cup as Purefoods, along with San Miguel Beer, was automatically seeded in the semifinals while Tondeña 65 failed to advance.
- Though Robert Jaworski coached Ginebra until the 1998 season, he played his very last official PBA game on May 25, 1997 at the Cuneta Astrodome in Game Six of the All-Filipino Cup finals against Purefoods, which Gordon's Gin lost. Jaworski was exactly 51 years, 2 months and 17 days old when he played his last PBA game.
- Only three teams played for the championship in the three conferences of the 1997 PBA Season: Purefoods, Gordon's Gin, and Alaska. The teams also won one title each that season: Purefoods beating Gordon's Gin in the All-Filipino Cup, Gordon's Gin beating Alaska in the Commissioner's Cup, and Alaska beating Purefoods in the Governors Cup. Alaska had a Grand Slam season the previous year.
- Twenty-nine of the 50 Greatest Players in PBA History, at some point of their careers, played for either the Ginebra or the Purefoods franchise.
- On November 4, 2012, a matchup between San Mig Coffee and Barangay Ginebra San Miguel was featured as the main game of a rare PBA triple-header.
- A season-opening match between the two teams highlighted a unique three-game 2013–14 Philippine Cup opening day on November 17, 2013. Each game was played in the major cities representing the Luzon, Visayas and Mindanao regions. The Barangay Ginebra-San Mig Coffee game was played at the Smart Araneta Coliseum in Quezon City, representing Luzon.
- The first encounter between the two ballclubs at the Mall of Asia Arena on January 5, 2014 attained the record of most spectators in a PBA game played at the said arena with 20,596.
- Game 7 of the 2013–14 Philippine Cup Semifinals set a new Philippine basketball attendance record of 24,883 fans at the Smart Araneta Coliseum on February 12, 2014. The game's telecast was also the most-watched primetime program in Mega Manila that night, setting another PBA record then.
- Purefoods legends Jerry Codiñera and Rey Evangelista had their jersey numbers retired before a Manila Clasico game on November 9, 2014.
- The teams played their first ever Christmas Day matchup on December 25, 2015. The game set a new crowd record for a PBA game at the Mall of Asia Arena with 21,808 fans watching the playoff match.
- The Manila Clasico duel between Barangay Ginebra and Star in the 2017 Governors' Cup was chosen by the Philippine Basketball Association Press Corps as the first ever Game of the Season, an award honoring the most memorable and best played game of the year. The match took place on September 3, 2017 at the Smart Araneta Coliseum, where Barangay Ginebra beat Star in overtime, 105-101, after 29 lead changes and 16 deadlocks. The Hotshots' import Malcolm Hill sent the game into overtime after sinking three pressure-packed free throws with 0.6 tenths of a second left in regulation to tie the score at 95.
- Retired players from the rival squads battled each other once more in an exhibition match on February 17, 2019 at the Smart Araneta Coliseum, where Ginebra beat Purefoods, 97–89.
- Purefoods franchise greats Peter June Simon and Marc Pingris had their jersey numbers retired during the halftime of a Manila Clasico game on December 25, 2021.

== See also ==
- Crispa–Toyota rivalry
- Barangay Ginebra–Meralco rivalry
- Choco Mucho–Creamline rivalry, another rivalry involving sister teams
