= Blackwater Bossing all-time roster =

The following is a list of players, both past and current, who appeared in at least one game for the Blackwater Bossing PBA franchise. Statistics are accurate as of the 2024 PBA Philippine Cup.

== Players ==
^	Denotes player who is currently on the Bossing roster								
^{+}	Denotes player who played as an import for the Bossing								
G	Guard	G/F	Guard-forward	F	Forward	F/C	Forward-center	C	Center

Player	Place of birth	Pos.	From	Yrs.	Seasons	Statistics					Ref.
Player	Place of birth	Pos.	From	Yrs.	Seasons	GP	MP	PTS	REB	AST	Ref.
Dylan Ababou	Philippines	G/F	UST	1	2016–2017	13	139	33	19	7	
Val Acuña	Philippines	G/F	UE	1	2014–2015	22	304	103	44	14	
Rey Mark Acuno	Philippines	C	UE	1	2021	3	6	2	0	0	
Keith Agovida	Philippines	G/F	Arellano	1	2015–2016	13	115	42	28	9	
Raymond Aguilar	Philippines	F	National-U	1	2016–2017	26	315	135	63	11	
Rabeh Al-Hussaini	Philippines	C	Ateneo	2	2018–2019	44	595	219	97	12	
Gelo Alolino	Philippines	G	National-U	1	2019	22	197	47	21	20	
John Ambulodto	Philippines	F/C	St. Clare	1	2022	5	20	7	3	0	
Baser Amer	Philippines	G	San Beda	3	2021–2024	54	1,258	488	108	136	
Paul Artadi	Philippines	G	UE	1	2014	11	210	72	20	27	
Bacon Austria	Philippines	G/F	Ateneo	1	2014–2015	6	64	7	13	4	
Mike Ayonayon^	Philippines	G	Philippine Christian	3	2022–present	40	476	228	51	50	
Jason Ballesteros	Philippines	C	San Sebastian	2	2014–2016	40	628	108	203	18	
Juneric Baloria	Philippines	G	UPHSD	1	2021–2022	7	74	31	17	5	
Gab Banal	Philippines	F	Mapúa	2	2022–2024	29	589	145	69	51	
Raphael Banal	Philippines	G	Hope International	3	2016–2019	39	344	88	46	29	
Mac Belo	Philippines	F	Far Eastern	4	2016–2020	101	2,551	1,137	517	158	
Staphon Blair^{+}	United States	F/C	Central Florida	1	2019	3	104	44	40	1	
Marqus Blakely^{+}	United States	F	Vermont	1	2019	10	372	180	131	56	
Jaylen Bond^{+}	United States	F	Temple	1	2021	5	188	60	63	8	
Ronjay Buenafe	Philippines	G	Emilio Aguinaldo	1	2016–2017	25	414	162	57	34	
Gilbert Bulawan	Philippines	F	San Sebastian	2	2014–2016	28	394	77	60	14	
Jerick Cañada	Philippines	G	Adamson	2	2015–2016	30	450	101	54	75	
KG Canaleta	Philippines	F	UE	4	2017; 2019–2021	49	1,041	411	155	40	
JVee Casio^	Philippines	G	La Salle	3	2021–present	39	914	401	81	119	
JR Cawaling	Philippines	F	Far Eastern	1	2014	4	36	12	5	4	
Robby Celiz	Philippines	G/F	National-U	1	2014–2015	24	410	110	34	29	
Reil Cervantes	Philippines	F	Far Eastern	3	2015–2017	66	1,141	560	160	50	
Val Chauca	United States	G	Adamson	1	2021–2022	8	78	19	4	4	
Justin Chua^	Philippines	F/C	Ateneo	1	2024–present	6	105	46	30	3	
Gio Ciriacruz	Philippines	F	Arellano	1	2015	1	11	0	1	0	
Archie Concepcion^	Philippines	G	Arellano	1	2023–present	5	50	20	11	5	
Mike Cortez	United States	G	De La Salle	3	2015–2016; 2017–2019	80	1,674	437	202	204	
Marcus Cousin^{+}	United States	C	Houston	1	2015	4	183	91	52	6	
Carl Bryan Cruz	Philippines	F	Far Eastern	2	2019, 2021	18	393	126	50	12	
Mark Cruz	Philippines	G	Letran	2	2017–2018	37	498	116	52	58	
Ed Daquioag	Philippines	G	UST	2	2020–2021	26	628	222	103	69	
Diego Dario	Philippines	G	Philippines	2	2019–2020	16	195	58	11	32	
Christian David^	Canada	F	Butler	1	2023–present	21	498	188	113	20	
Eric Dawson^{+}	United States	C	Midwestern State	1	2016	6	233	109	91	28	
Arthur dela Cruz	Philippines	F	San Beda	2	2015–2017	44	1,211	548	237	104	
Ron Dennison	Philippines	G	Far Eastern	2	2020–2021	22	301	47	51	17	
Paul Desiderio	Philippines	G	Philippines	3	2019–2021	57	943	283	160	57	
Michael DiGregorio^	United States	G	McKendree	5	2017–2019; 2023–present	110	2,741	1,188	259	175	
Marcus Douthit^{+}	United States	C	Providence	1	2015	17	739	362	233	61	
Mark Dyke	Philippines	F	De La Salle	1	2022	12	100	32	28	6	
Barkley Eboña	Philippines	F/C	Far Eastern	2	2021–2022	33	599	156	135	28	
Jaymo Eguilos	Philippines	F	Far Eastern	1	2016	2	14	0	4	0	
Simon Enciso	United States	G	Notre Dame de Namur	1	2021	11	381	151	31	45	
Joseph Eriobu	British Hong Kong	F	Mapúa	1	2019	7	69	34	21	4	
Poy Erram	Philippines	C	Ateneo	4	2014–2018	103	2,426	939	736	104	
Richard Escoto^	Philippines	F	Far Eastern	4	2020–present	70	804	215	118	27	
Jarrid Famous^{+}	United States	C	South Florida	1	2018	6	242	158	110	10	
Bryan Faundo	Philippines	F/C	Letran	1	2014–2015	27	671	259	157	23	
James Forrester	Canada	G/F	Arellano	1	2016–2017	10	76	21	7	6	
Aaron Fuller^{+}	United States	F	USC	1	2019	1	37	26	10	3	
Jon Jon Gabriel	Philippines	F/C	San Lorenzo	2	2020–2021	13	83	36	19	1	
Riego Gamalinda	Philippines	F	San Beda	3	2014–2017	94	1,836	629	308	89	
Brandon Ganuelas-Rosser	United States	F/C	UC Riverside	1	2022	8	153	89	28	5	
Shawn Glover^{+}	United States	F	Oral Roberts	2	2022, 2022	14	559	377	146	55	
Jollo Go	Philippines	G	De La Salle	1	2022	12	99	43	7	6	
Frank Golla	Philippines	F/C	Ateneo	4	2015–2016; 2020–2021	47	610	135	125	25	
Bradwyn Guinto^	Philippines	F/C	San Sebastian	1	2023–present	22	411	102	78	25	
Brian Heruela	Philippines	G	Cebu	2	2014–2015; 2019	30	939	287	130	146	
Tyrus Hill^	United States	F	De La Salle	2	2023–present	33	538	170	83	21	
RK Ilagan^	Philippines	G	San Sebastian	2	2023–present	31	574	276	87	102	
Trevis Jackson	United States	G	Sacramento State	1	2022	12	241	77	22	14	
Chris Javier	Philippines	F/C	UE	2	2017–2019	38	370	119	66	15	
Clifford Jopia^	Philippines	C	San Beda	1	2024–present	11	105	7	23	4	
Raymar Jose	Philippines	F	Far Eastern	2	2017–2019	48	574	227	260	32	
Keala King^{+}	United States	F	Long Beach State	1	2016	3	91	60	29	9	
Cameron Krutwig^{+}	United States	C	Loyola Chicago	1	2022	12	484	229	195	68	
James Kwekuteye^	Philippines	G	San Beda	1	2023–present	15	275	116	29	25	
Carlo Lastimosa	Philippines	G	St. Benilde	1	2015–2016	34	891	612	104	82	
Eddie Laure	Philippines	F	Adamson	1	2014–2015	32	604	153	113	25	
Marion Magat	Philippines	F/C	National-U	2	2020–2021	20	351	96	88	8	
Allein Maliksi	Philippines	G/F	UST	3	2017–2019	68	1,757	869	329	123	
Dave Marcelo	Philippines	F/C	San Beda	2	2017–2018	21	227	66	46	6	
Will McAloney	Philippines	F/C	San Carlos	1	2021	5	55	22	10	2	
Rashawn McCarthy	United States	G	SUNY–Old Westbury	3	2021–2023	46	1,100	348	125	140	
Jason Melano	Philippines	F	Saint Francis of Assisi	2	2015–2017	13	129	55	25	6	
Justin Melton	Philippines	G	Mount Olive	2	2022, 2022	24	382	43	54	41	
Ogie Menor	Philippines	G	San Beda	1	2014	10	158	62	17	11	
Denok Miranda	Philippines	G	Far Eastern	2	2016–2017	30	400	116	49	49	
Kelly Nabong	United States	F/C	SRJC	1	2021–2022	8	234	86	66	10	
Rey Nambatac^	Philippines	G	Letran	1	2024–present	11	260	122	31	48	
Kyle Neypes	Philippines	F	National-U	1	2018	3	9	0	0	0	
Alex Nuyles	Philippines	G/F	Adamson	1	2014–2015	15	229	89	21	20	
Chris Ortiz^{+}	United States	F/C	Kent State	1	2023–2024	11	453	283	114	54	
Renz Palma	Philippines	G	UE	2	2018–2019	27	271	85	46	14	
Andre Paras	United States	F/C	Philippines	1	2021–2022	19	180	41	28	3	
Bobby Ray Parks Jr.	Philippines	G	National-U	1	2019	23	854	491	145	80	
Kyle Pascual	United States	F/C	San Beda	2	2016–2017	45	876	252	180	25	
Ronald Pascual	Philippines	F/G	San Sebastian	1	2016	1	4	0	0	0	
Tristan Perez	Philippines	F/C	National-U	1	2016–2017	3	8	0	5	0	
John Pinto	Philippines	G	Arellano	3	2016–2018	71	1,601	467	222	272	
Rey Publico	Philippines	F	Letran	1	2022	12	101	28	17	4	
Imad Qahwash^{+}	Palestine	G	Central Arkansas	1	2016	6	87	23	15	14	
Raphy Reyes	Philippines	G	UE	2	2015–2016	53	829	272	62	57	
M. J. Rhett^{+}	United States	C	Mississippi	1	2016	11	465	208	184	33	
Larry Rodriguez	Philippines	F	PMI	1	2014–2015	10	160	35	54	8	
Troy Rosario^	Philippines	F	National-U	2	2022–present	30	880	384	161	66	
Matt Salem	United States	G/F	National-U	2	2019–2020	18	101	44	14	3	
Sunday Salvacion	Philippines	G/F	St. Benilde	1	2014–2015	20	309	119	34	8	
David Semerad	Australia	F/C	San Beda	1	2021	5	72	5	17	4	
James Sena^	Philippines	F/C	José Rizal	6	2015–2019; 2022–present	154	2,198	625	373	123	
Maurice Shaw	Philippines	C	Hutchinson CC	1	2020	3	23	2	2	0	
Trevis Simpson^{+}	United States	G/F	UNC Greensboro	1	2017	3	75	49	17	4	
Greg Smith^{+}	United States	C	Fresno State	2	2017; 2019	14	606	361	298	62	
Alex Stepheson^{+}	United States	C	USC	1	2019	6	236	133	132	17	
Rey Suerte^	Philippines	G	UE	3	2022–present	60	1,205	523	189	103	
Roi Sumang	Philippines	G	UE	5	2016–2020	117	2,312	922	274	361	
Yousef Taha	Kuwait	C	Mapúa	1	2022–2023	30	554	198	177	54	
Chris Timberlake	United States	G	North Florida	1	2014–2015	22	241	42	17	20	
Juami Tiongson	Philippines	G	Ateneo	2	2014–2016	20	205	66	20	19	
Mike Tolomia	Philippines	G	Far Eastern	3	2019–2021	26	544	237	64	62	
Joshua Torralba	United States	G	De La Salle	2	2021–2022	29	325	110	51	12	
Abu Tratter	Philippines	F/C	De La Salle	1	2019	20	395	152	93	11	
Don Trollano	Philippines	G/F	Adamson	2	2019–2020	13	387	175	108	23	
Jaydee Tungcab^	Philippines	G	Philippines	1	2024–present	10	151	70	24	22	
Ato Ular	Philippines	F	Letran	2	2022–2024	41	1,029	406	330	31	
Almond Vosotros	Philippines	G	De La Salle	1	2015–2016	13	103	18	6	8	
Henry Walker^{+}	United States	G/F	Kansas State	2	2017–2018	27	1,102	645	373	134	
Jay Washington	Philippines	F	Eckerd	1	2021–2022	9	115	14	16	8	
Troy Williams^{+}	United States	F	Indiana	1	2023–present	3	112	117	35	17	
James Yap^	Philippines	G/F	UE	1	2024–present	6	50	22	8	1	
Paul Zamar^	Philippines	G	UE	1	2018	19	433	195	69	28	
