= TNT Tropang 5G all-time roster =

The following is a list of players, both past and current, who appeared at least in one game for the TNT Tropang 5G PBA franchise.

== A ==
Name	Position	School/University	Nickname	Years with TNT		No. of seasons	Ref.
Name	Position	School/University	Nickname	From	To	No. of seasons	Ref.
Dylan Ababou	G / F	UST	Super Ababou	2015	2016	1	
Aaron Aban	F	Letran	Triple A	2010	2016	5	
Denis Abbatuan	F	JRC		1990	1991	2	
Japeth Aguilar	F/C	Western Kentucky	Jumping Japeth	2009	2013	1	
Peter Aguilar	F/C	TUA		1992		1	
Ato Agustin	PG	Lyceum	Atom Bomb	1997		1	
Rabeh Al-Hussaini	C	Ateneo		2013		1	
Jimmy Alapag	PG	Cal State San Bernardino	Mighty Mouse	2003	2015	12	
Kevin Alas	G	Letran		2014	2015	1	
Jonathan Aldave	F	Letran		2006	2007	1	
Jayjay Alejandro	G	National-U		2020	2023	3	
Yousif Aljamal	SF	San Beda		2007	2009	2	
Don Allado	F/C	De La Salle		2006	2008	2	
Alejo Alolor	G/F	Southwestern-U		1990	1992	3	
Eric Altamirano	PG	Philippines		1991		1	
Bong Alvarez	F	San Beda		2002		1	
Rich Alvarez	F	Ateneo		2010	2013	3	
Mychal Ammons (Import)	F	South Alabama		2016		1	
Lou Amundson (Import)	PF	UNLV		2017		1	
Josel Angeles	F	Lyceum			2001		
Sean Anthony	F	McGill		2013	2014	1	
Jimbo Aquino	G	San Sebastian		2013	2014	1	
Leo Austria	PG	Lyceum		1985	1993	9	

== B ==
Name	Position	School/University	Nickname	Years with TNT		No. of seasons	Ref.
Name	Position	School/University	Nickname	From	To	No. of seasons	Ref.
Gido Babilonia	C	UST		1992; 2000	1994; 2001	5	
Nonoy Baclao	F/C	Ateneo		2013	2014	1	
Maurice Baker (Import)	PG	Oklahoma State		2011		1	
Gab Banal	F	Mapúa		2021	2022	2	
Francis Barcellano	C	Far Eastern					
Donbel Belano	PG	Visayas		2002	2009	7	
Nic Belasco	F	Notre Dame de Namur		2009	2010	1	
Rashad Bell (Import)	F	Boston University		2010		1	
Keith Benson(Import)	PF/C	Oakland		2013		1	
Todd Bernard (Import)	G	Fresno State		2000	2001	2	
Egay Billones	PG	Las Piñas College		2006	2008	2	
Marqus Blakely (Import)	F	Vermont		2018		1	
Ken Bono	PF/C	Adamson		2019		1	
Lowell Briones	F	Visayas					

== C ==
Name	Position	School/University	Nickname	Years with TNT		No. of seasons	Ref.
Name	Position	School/University	Nickname	From	To	No. of seasons	Ref.
Elmer Cabahug	SG	University of Visayas		1994	1996	3	
Don Camaso	F/C	Metro Manila College		2000; 2004	2002 2005	4	
Niño Canaleta	SF	UE		2014		1	
Damian Cantrell (Import)	F	San Francisco		2003		1	
Glenn Capacio	F	FEU		1997	2000	4	
Mark Cardona	G	De La Salle	Captain Hook	2005	2010	5	
Harvey Carey	PF	Sonoma State		2003	2020	17	
Jeffrey Cariaso	SG	Sonoma State	The Jet	1997	1999	3	
Rodney Carney	G/F	Memphis		2014		1	
Joy Carpio	PF	Ateneo		1991	1992	2	
JK Casino	G	CEU		2019		1	
Merwin Castelo	G/F	San Beda					
Jayson Castro	G	PCU	The Blur	2008	present	-	
Robby Celiz	F	NU		2013	2014	1	
Gec Chia	G	Ateneo		2008	2009	2	
Justin Chua	C	Ateneo	Great Wall of Chua	2017 2023	2017 present	-	
Alex Crisano	F/C	Brooklyn		2002		1	
Harmon Codiñera	SF	FEU		1990		1	
Jerry Codiñera	C	UE	The Defensive Minister	1999	2002	4	
Ronnie Coleman (Import)	C	Southern California		1994 1996		2	
Tim Coloso	SF	Letran		1990			
Lanard Copeland (Import)	F	Georgia State					
Michael Craig (Import)	F	Southern Mississippi College		2017		1	
Carl Bryan Cruz	F	FEU	CBC	2021	present	-	
Jericho Cruz	G	Adamson University		2018	2019	2	
Rey Cuenco	C	Arellano University		1994	1995	2	
Gabby Cui	F/C	Ateneo			2001		

== D ==
Name	Position	School/University	Nickname	Years with TNT		No. of seasons	Ref.
Name	Position	School/University	Nickname	From	To	No. of seasons	Ref.
Sam Daghles (Asian Import)	G	San Diego Mesa CC- Midwestern State		2015		1	
Shawn Daniels	C	Bakersfield JC-Utah State		2009	2010	1	
Angelo David	C	FEU					
Stacy Davis (Import)	F	Pepperdine		2018		1	
Jonathan de Guzman	SF	Adamson					
Samboy de Leon	G/F	CEU		2019	present	-	
Ranidel de Ocampo	SF	St. Francis	R.D.O	2008	2017	9	
Yancy de Ocampo	C	St. Francis		2004; 2006	2005 2010	5	
Richard Del Rosario	F	La Salle					
Gilbert Demape	G	Cebu Tech					
Dell Demps (Import)	G/F	Pacific		1992		1	
Mike Digregorio	G	McKendree		2019		1	
Jared Dillinger	F	University of Hawaii	Daredevil	2008	2013	5	

== E ==
Name	Position	School/University	Nickname	Years with TNT		No. of seasons	Ref.
Name	Position	School/University	Nickname	From	To	No. of seasons	Ref.
Gherome Ejercito	SG	Adamson		2000	2001	2	
Simon Enciso	G	Notre Dame de Namur		2020		1	
Poy Erram	C	Ateneo		2020	present	-	
Pong Escobal	PG	San Beda		2008	2010	2	
Tony Boy Espinosa	PG	La Salle					
Elmer Espiritu	SF	UE		2014	2015	1	
Kenny Evans	G	San Francisco State					
Chris Exciminiano	G	Far Eastern	The X-Factor	2021	present	-	

== F ==
Name	Position	School/University	Nickname	Years with TNT		No. of seasons	Ref.
Name	Position	School/University	Nickname	From	To	No. of seasons	Ref.
Expedito Falcasantos	F	UC					
Courtney Fells	SG	NC State		2013		1	
Kalani Ferreria	G/F	Moorpark		2007	2008	1	
John Ferriols	PF	USJ-R		2006; 2012–2014		3	
Lervin Flores	F/C	Arellano		2020	present	-	
Larry Fonacier	GF	Ateneo	Baby Face Assassin	2010	2017	7	
Gary Forbes (Import)	SF	Virginia-UMass		2009		1	
Richie Frahm (Import)	G/F	Gonzaga		2002		1	
Patrick Fran	G	UST					
Jose Francisco	G	FEU					
Aaron Fuller (Import)	F	USC		2022		1	

== G ==
Name	Position	School/University	Nickname	Years with TNT		No. of seasons	Ref.
Name	Position	School/University	Nickname	From	To	No. of seasons	Ref.
Bryan Gahol	F/C	UP		1999		1	
Bambam Gamalinda	G/F	San Beda		2011	2013	2	
Matt Ganuelas-Rosser	F	Cal Poly Pomona	M.G.R, The Black Panther	2014 2022	2017 present	-	
RR Garcia	G	FEU		2017	2018	2	
Allan Garrido	G	SSC–R					
Willie Generalao	PG	University of Visayas					
Niño Gelig	G	University of Santo Tomas		2004	2006	2	
Leon Gilmore	F	Stephen F. Austin		2022		1	
Mike Glover (Import)	F	Iona	Optimus Prime	2018		1	
Frank Golla	PF/C	Ateneo		2016	2020	3	
Norman Gonzales	F	San Beda		2001	2003	3	
Jeffrey Graves	PF	Arellano		1990		1	
Donté Greene (Import)	PF	Syracuse		2017		1	
Abet Guidaben	C	San Jose Recoletos		1990	1993	4	

== H ==
Name	Position	School/University	Nickname	Years with TNT		No. of seasons	Ref.
Name	Position	School/University	Nickname	From	To	No. of seasons	Ref.
Darvin Ham (Import)	F	Texas Tech		2006		1	
Derrick Hamilton(Import)	F/C	Southern Miss		1990		1	
Paul Harris (Import)	G/F	Syracuse		2011; 2012; 2014		3	
Donnell Harvey (Import)	F/C	Florida		2012		1	
Nap Hatton	F	SSC-R					
Levi Hernandez	G	Arellano		2016	2017	1	
Brian Heruela	G	Cebu		2019; 2021–present		-	
Jeff Hodge (Import)	G/F	South Alabama		1990			
Jerald Honeycutt(Import)	F/C	Tulane University		2005		1	
Richard Howell (Import)	F/C	NC State		2014		1	
Jalen Hudson (Import)	G/F	Florida		2023		1	

== J ==
Name	Position	School/University	Nickname	Years with TNT		No. of seasons	Ref.
Name	Position	School/University	Nickname	From	To	No. of seasons	Ref.
Jun Jabar	SG	South Western					
Chris Javier	F/C	UE		2020	2021	1	
Othyus Jeffers (Import)	G/F	Robert Morris		2014		1	
Danny Johnson (Import)	G	Charleston					
Ivan Johnson (Import)	FC	Cal State San Bernardino		2015; 2016		2	
Jerome Jordan (Import)	C	Tulsa		2013		1	
Bobby Jose	F	UST					
Francisco Jose	G/F	FEU					
Poch Juinio	F/C	UP Diliman		2001; 2006		2	
Terrence Jones (Import)	F/C	Kentucky		2019		1	

== K ==
Name	Position	School/University	Nickname	Years with TNT		No. of seasons	Ref.
Name	Position	School/University	Nickname	From	To	No. of seasons	Ref.
Glenn Khobuntin	F	National U		2021	present	-	

== L ==
Name	Position	School/University	Nickname	Years with TNT		No. of seasons	Ref.
Name	Position	School/University	Nickname	From	To	No. of seasons	Ref.
Rob Labagala	PG	UE	Little Rob	2014	2015	1	
Dwight Lago	SF	La Salle					
Elmer Lago	G/F	De La Salle					
Gilbert Lao	C	UST		2008 2010	2009 2010	3	
Terrence Leather (Import)	F/C	South Florida		2007	2008	1	
Braulio Lim	F	UE					
Rudy Lingganay	PG	University of the East		2017		1	
Mario Little (Import)	G/F	Kansas		2016		1	
Noli Locsin	PF	De La Salle	The Tank	1999–2000; 2003		3	
Romy Lopez	SG	Arellano					
June Longalong	F	Perpetual					

== M ==
Name	Position	School/University	Nickname	Years with TNT		No. of seasons	Ref.
Name	Position	School/University	Nickname	From	To	No. of seasons	Ref.
Marion Magat	F/C	National U		2019		1	
Dave Marcelo	F/C	San Beda	Dave Gwapo	2021	present	-	
Michael Madanly (Asian Import)	G/F	Syria		2016		1	
Jojo Manalo	G	Perpetual					
Jojo Martin	F	NCBA					
Peter Martin	F	SSC–R					
Tee McClary (Import)	G/F	Jacksonville					
K. J. McDaniels (Import)	G/F	Clemson		2019		1	
Aaron McGhee (Import)	F/C	Oklahoma					
Carlito Mejos	SG	University of Visayas		1990	1991	2	
Magnum Membrere	G	Ateneo		2011	2012	1	
Anastacio Mendoza	G	FEU					
Gryann Mendoza	SG	FEU		2020	present	-	
Vergel Meneses	F	JRU		2006		1	
Willie Miller	G	Letran	The Thriller	2004–2006; 2015		3	
Silas Mills (Import)	F	Utah State					
Dennis Miranda	PG	FEU		2015	2016	1	
Michael Miranda	F	San Sebastian College - Recoletos		2018	2019	1	
Tony Mitchell (Import)	G/F	Alabama		2013		1	
Matt Mobley (Import)	G	St. Bonaventure		2022		1	
Kib Montalbo	G	La Salle		2020	present	-	
McKenzie Moore (Import)	G	UTEP		2021		1	
Cadel Mosqueda	SF	Arellano		1990			

== N ==
Name	Position	School/University	Nickname	Years with TNT		No. of seasons	Ref.
Name	Position	School/University	Nickname	From	To	No. of seasons	Ref.
Chris Nicdao	C	FEU					
Miguel Noble (Import)	C	Utica College					
Alex Nuyles	G/F	Adamson University		2016	2018	3	

== O ==
Name	Position	School/University	Nickname	Years with TNT		No. of seasons	Ref.
Name	Position	School/University	Nickname	From	To	No. of seasons	Ref.
Calvin Oftana	F	San Beda		2022	present	-	
Sidney Onwubere	F	EAC		2017	2018	1	
Emmerson Oreta	G	UST		2010	2013	2	
Cameron Oliver (Import)	PF	Nevada		2022		1	

== P ==
Name	Position	School/University	Nickname	Years with TNT		No. of seasons	Ref.
Name	Position	School/University	Nickname	From	To	No. of seasons	Ref.
Victor Pablo	PF	FEU		2000	2007	7	
Philip Paredes	F/C			2017	2018	2	
Bobby Ray Parks Jr.	G	National U		2019	2020	2	
Ali Peek	F/C	St. Mary's	Mountain Man	2008–2010; 2010–2014		7	
Steffphon Pettigrew(Import)	F	WKU		2015		1	
Roger Pogoy	G	FEU		2016–present	present	-	
Eloy Poligrates	PG	SWU		2013	2014	1	
Dindo Pumaren	PG	La Salle					
Franz Pumaren	PG	La Salle		1997	1998		

== Q ==
Name	Position	School/University	Nickname	Years with TNT		No. of seasons	Ref.
Name	Position	School/University	Nickname	From	To	No. of seasons	Ref.
Eugene Quilban	PG	SSC-R					
J.R. Quiñahan	FC	University of Visayas	Baby Shaq	2010		1	

== R ==
Name	Position	School/University	Nickname	Years with TNT		No. of seasons	Ref.
Name	Position	School/University	Nickname	From	To	No. of seasons	Ref.
Kevin Ramas	C	Mapúa					
Salvador Ramos	SF	Letran		1990	1991	2	
Bong Ravena	G/F	UE		2000	2005	5	
Pamboy Raymundo	PG	San Sebastian		2011	2013	2	
Kenny Redfield (Import)	G/F	Michigan State					
Ricky Relosa	PF	Mapúa		1990		1	
Eric Reyes	F	Ateneo					
Gilbert Reyes	PG	Ateneo					
Jai Reyes	PG	Ateneo		2013; 2015	2014 2016	4	
Jun Reyes		Ateneo		1990			
Rob Reyes	F/C	Flagler		2008; 2013	2009 2015	3	
Ryan Reyes	G	CSU Fullerton		2010	present	-	
Scottie Reynolds(Import)	G	Villanova		2011		1	
Glen Rice Jr.(Import)	G/F	Georgia Tech		2017		1	
Renren Ritualo	G	De La Salle	The Rainman	2006	2010		
Terrence Romeo	G	FEU	The Bro, Swaggy T	2018		1	
Larry Rodriguez	PF	PMI		2015	2016	1	
Kris Rosales	G	Hope International		2016	2017	2	
Troy Rosario	F	NU		2015	2022	7	

== S ==
Name	Position	School/University	Nickname	Years with TNT		No. of seasons	Ref.
Name	Position	School/University	Nickname	From	To	No. of seasons	Ref.
Jessie Saitanan	F/C	Mapúa		2018		1	
Eric Salamat	G	Ateneo		2013	2014	1	
Allan Salangsang	F	Letran		2004	2006	2	
Omar Samhan (Import)	C	St. Mary's		2012		1	
Joey Santamaria	PF	La Salle					
Andy Seigle	C	New Orleans		1997	1999	3	
Danny Seigle	F	Wagner College	Dynamite	2013	2017	3	
Anthony Semerad	F	San Beda		2017	2019	3	
David Semerad	F/C	San Beda		2019	2020	2	
David Simon (Import)	C	IPFW		2016		1	
Jose Slaughter (Import)	F	Portland		1990		1	
Joshua Smith (Import)	C	Georgetown		2017; 2018		2	
Alfonso Solis	G	University of Visayas		1996	2000	5	
Raul Soyud	C/PF	University of the Philippines		2022	present	-	
Carlos Strong (Import)	F	Boston					
JJ Sullinger (Import)	F	Ohio State					
Chris Sumalinog	F	Ateneo		2015	2018	4	

== T ==
Name	Position	School/University	Nickname	Years with TNT		No. of seasons	Ref.
Name	Position	School/University	Nickname	From	To	No. of seasons	Ref.
Yousef Taha	C	Mapúa		2018	2019	2	
Mac Tallo	PG	SWU		2017		1	
Mark Tallo	G	SWU		1991	1992	2	
Alfrancis Tamsi	G	FEU		2016	2018	2	
Jojo Tangkay	G	SWU		2002		1	
Jack Tanuan	C	FEU		1996		1	
Asi Taulava	C	BYU-HawaiI		1999	2007	9	
Moala Tautuaa	F/C	Chadron State	Big Mo	2015	2018	3	
Alyun Taylor	G/F			1990		1	
Mark Telan	F/C	La Salle		2002	2006	4	
Alvin Teng	F	Arellano		1997	1998	2	
Bernard Todd (Import)	G	Fresno State					
Norbert Torres	F/C	La Salle	The Bear	2017	2018	1	
Don Trollano	G/F	Adamson		2018	2019	2	
Jaydee Tungcab	SG	University of the Philippines		2022	present	-	
Jeremy Tyler (Import)	F/C	San Diego		2018		1	

== V ==
Name	Position	School/University	Nickname	Years with TNT		No. of seasons	Ref.
Name	Position	School/University	Nickname	From	To	No. of seasons	Ref.
Ludovico Valenciano	SF	La Salle					
Paul Varilla	G/F	UE		2023	present	-	
Manny Victorino	C	JRC		1991	1992	2	
Kahi Villa	F	BYU-HawaiI					
Larry Villanil	SF						
Elpidio Villamin	F	FEU		1996	1997	2	
Vernie Villarias	SG	UE		1990		1	
Almond Vosotros	G	La Salle		2019	2025	2	

== W ==
Name	Position	School/University	Nickname	Years with TNT		No. of seasons	Ref.
Name	Position	School/University	Nickname	From	To	No. of seasons	Ref.
Tiras Wade	F	Louisiana					
Jay Washington	F	Eckerd	J-Wash	2005; 2014; 2019	2008; 2015; 2021	7	
Charles Waters (Import)	F	Webster		2010	2011	2	
Shawn Weinstein (Import)	SG	St. Edward's University		2012		1	
Kelly Williams	F/C	Oakland	Machine Gun	2010; 2021	2019 present	-	
Mikey Williams	G	Cal State Fullerton		2021	present	-	

== Y ==
Name	Position	School/University	Nickname	Years with TNT		Ref.
Name	Position	School/University	Nickname	From	To	Ref.
Mark Yee	F	San Sebastian Cavite		2009	2011	
Rey Yncierto	SG			1990	1991	
Tonichi Yturri	C	De La Salle		1990	1991	
