= 2014–15 Blackwater Elite season =

- Head coach: Leo Isaac
- Owners: Ever Bilena Cosmetics, Inc.

Philippine Cup results
- Record: 0–11 (0%)
- Place: 12th
- Playoff finish: Did not qualify

Commissioner's Cup results
- Record: 3–8 (27.3%)
- Place: 12th
- Playoff finish: Did not qualify

Governors' Cup results
- Record: 1–10 (9.1%)
- Place: 12th
- Playoff finish: Did not qualify

Blackwater Elite seasons

The 2014–15 Blackwater Elite season was the 1st season of the franchise in the Philippine Basketball Association (PBA).

== Key dates ==
- July 18: The 2014 PBA Expansion Draft took place in Microtel Acropolis, in Libis, Quezon City.
- August 24: The 2014 PBA Draft took place in Midtown Atrium, Robinson Place Manila.

== Expansion draft picks ==
Pick	Player	Pos.	Nationality	Previous team	PBA years^{[a]}
1	Danny Ildefonso	C	Philippines	Meralco Bolts	16
3	Alex Nuyles	G	Philippines	Rain or Shine Elasto Painters	1
5	JR Cawaling	F	Philippines	San Mig Super Coffee Mixers	1
7	Eddie Laure	F	Philippines	Alaska Aces	11
9	Bryan Faundo	F	Philippines	Barangay Ginebra San Miguel	5
11	John Paul Erram		Philippines	Talk 'N Text Tropang Texters	1
13	Paul Artadi	G	Philippines	Meralco Bolts	10
15	Gilbert Bulawan	F	Philippines	Barako Bull Energy	3
17	Riego Gamalinda	G	Philippines	Talk 'N Text Tropang Texters	4
19	Chris Timberlake	G	United States	Meralco Bolts	5
21	Norman Gonzales	F	Philippines	San Miguel Beermen	13
23	Robby Celiz	G	Philippines	Talk 'N Text Tropang Texters	1

== Draft picks ==
Round	Pick	Player	Position	Nationality	PBA D-League team	College
1	12	Juami Tiongson	G	Philippines	Blackwater (D-League)	ADMU
2	23	Frank Golla	F	Philippines	none	ADMU
3	26	Brian Heruela	G	Philippines	Big Chill Super Chargers	UC
3	27	Maclean Sabellina	F	Philippines	Boracay Rum Waves	STI
3	30	Juneric Baloria	G	Philippines	Big Chill Super Chargers	Perpetual
3	31	Raul Soyud	C	Philippines	Blackwater (D-League)	UP
3	33	Clark Bautista	G	Philippines	Blackwater (D-League)	UST
3	34	Ford Ruaya	F/G	Philippines	Hog's Breath Razorbacks	Letran

== Roster ==
2014–15 Blackwater Elite roster
Players
Coaches

Pos.	#	POB	Name	Height	Weight	DOB (YYYY–MM–DD)	From
F/C	0	(Philippines)	Bryan Faundo	6 ft 7 in (2.01 m)	225 lb (102 kg)	1984-02-18	Letran
G	1	(Philippines)	Jerick Cañada	5 ft 8 in (1.73 m)	145 lb (66 kg)	1982-05-27	Adamson
G	3	(United States)	Chris Timberlake (IN)	5 ft 11.5 in (1.82 m)	182 lb (83 kg)	1985-04-28	North Florida
G	4	(Philippines)	Raphy Reyes	5 ft 10 in (1.78 m)	165 lb (75 kg)	1987-12-01	UE
G	6	(Philippines)	Carlo Lastimosa (IN)	6 ft 1 in (1.85 m)	182 lb (83 kg)	1990-09-03	St. Benilde
C	7	(Philippines)	John Paul Erram	6 ft 8 in (2.03 m)	235 lb (107 kg)	1989-07-07	Ateneo
F	8	(Philippines)	Robby Celiz	6 ft 5 in (1.96 m)	217 lb (98 kg)	1988-09-07	National-U
F	11	(Philippines)	Gilbert Bulawan	6 ft 5 in (1.96 m)	195 lb (88 kg)	1986-08-25	San Sebastian
F/C	17	(Philippines)	Frank Golla (R)	6 ft 5 in (1.96 m)	230 lb (104 kg)	1990-01-17	Ateneo
C	18	(Philippines)	Jason Ballesteros	6 ft 7 in (2.01 m)	200 lb (91 kg)	1985-10-07	San Sebastian
F	21	(Philippines)	Riego Gamalinda	6 ft 4 in (1.93 m)	184 lb (83 kg)	1986-05-25	San Beda
F	25	(Philippines)	Eddie Laure (C)	6 ft 4 in (1.93 m)	195 lb (88 kg)	1977-07-06	Adamson
F	26	(Philippines)	Reil Cervantes	6 ft 5 in (1.96 m)	210 lb (95 kg)	1986-08-16	Far Eastern
F	33	(Philippines)	Val Acuña	6 ft 4 in (1.93 m)	180 lb (82 kg)	1986-11-24	UE
G	36	(Australia)	Scott O'Mara (R)	6 ft 0 in (1.83 m)	200 lb (91 kg)	1991-01-13	Dandenong Rangers
C	43	(United States)	Alex Crisano	6 ft 6 in (1.98 m)	240 lb (109 kg)	1976-02-26	Brooklyn
F	55	(Philippines)	Larry Rodriguez (IN)	6 ft 5 in (1.96 m)	200 lb (91 kg)	1983-05-05	PMI
F	80	(Philippines)	Sunday Salvacion	6 ft 4 in (1.93 m)	190 lb (86 kg)	1978-12-17	St. Benilde

Head coach

- (Philippines) Leo Isaac (Mapúa)

Assistant coach(es)

- (Philippines) Rodil Sablan (UST)
- (Philippines) Aries Dimaunahan (UST)
- Patrick Aquino (Philippines)
- (Philippines) Junjie Ablan (Letran)

Team manager

- (Philippines) Johnson Martines

Legend

- (C) Team captain
- (CI) Commissioner's Cup Import
- (GI) Governors' Cup Import
- (EI) EASL Import
- (DP) Unsigned draft pick
- (FA) Free agent
- (IN) Inactive
- (S) Suspended
- (R) Rookie
- Injured

== Philippine Cup ==
=== Eliminations ===
==== Standings ====
Pos	Team	W	L	PCT	GB	Qualification
1	San Miguel Beermen	9	2	.818 (Note: Head-to-head record: San Miguel 1–0 Rain or Shine)	—	Advance to semifinals
2	Rain or Shine Elasto Painters	9	2	.818	—	Advance to semifinals
3	Alaska Aces	8	3	.727 (Note: Head-to-head record: Alaska 1–0 Talk 'N Text)	1	Twice-to-beat in the quarterfinals
4	Talk 'N Text Tropang Texters	8	3	.727	1	Twice-to-beat in the quarterfinals
5	Barangay Ginebra San Miguel	6	5	.545 (Note: Head-to-head quotient: Barangay Ginebra 1.07, Meralco 1.06, Purefoods Star 0.89)	3	Twice-to-beat in the quarterfinals
6	Meralco Bolts	6	5	.545	3	Twice-to-beat in the quarterfinals
7	Purefoods Star Hotshots	6	5	.545	3	Twice-to-win in the quarterfinals
8	GlobalPort Batang Pier	5	6	.455	4	Twice-to-win in the quarterfinals
9	Barako Bull Energy	4	7	.364 (Note: Head-to-head record: Barako Bull 1–0 NLEX)	5	Twice-to-win in the quarterfinals
10	NLEX Road Warriors	4	7	.364	5	Twice-to-win in the quarterfinals
11	Kia Sorento	1	10	.091	8	
12	Blackwater Elite	0	11	.000	9	

Source: PBA.ph

=== Playoffs ===
==== Bracket ====
Quarterfinals (1st phase) (Higher seeds twice-to-beat)
3	Alaska	82
10	NLEX	78
6	Meralco	77
7	Purefoods Star	65
4	Talk 'N Text	105
9	Barako Bull	76
5	Barangay Ginebra	95
8	GlobalPort	78

Quarterfinals (2nd phase) (Single elimination)
3	Alaska	87
6	Meralco	69
4	Talk N Text	83
5	Barangay Ginebra	67

Semifinals (Best-of-7)
2	Rain or Shine	2
3	Alaska	4
1	San Miguel	4
4	Talk N' Text	0

Finals (Best-of-7)
3	Alaska	3
1	San Miguel	4

== Commissioner's Cup ==
=== Eliminations ===
==== Standings ====
Pos	Team	W	L	PCT	GB	Qualification
1	Rain or Shine Elasto Painters	8	3	.727 (Note: Head-to-head quotient: Rain or Shine 1.025, Talk 'N Text 1.010, Purefoods 0.969)	—	Twice-to-beat in the quarterfinals
2	Talk 'N Text Tropang Texters	8	3	.727	—	Twice-to-beat in the quarterfinals
3	Purefoods Star Hotshots	8	3	.727	—	Best-of-three quarterfinals
4	NLEX Road Warriors	6	5	.545 (Note: Head-to-head record: NLEX 1–0 Meralco)	2	Best-of-three quarterfinals
5	Meralco Bolts	6	5	.545	2	Best-of-three quarterfinals
6	Alaska Aces	5	6	.455 (Note: Head-to-head quotient: Alaska 1.021, Barako Bull 1.019, Barangay Ginebra 0.960)	3	Best-of-three quarterfinals
7	Barako Bull Energy	5	6	.455	3	Twice-to-win in the quarterfinals
8	Barangay Ginebra San Miguel	5	6	.455	3	Twice-to-win in the quarterfinals
9	San Miguel Beermen	4	7	.364 (Note: Head-to-head quotient: San Miguel 1.011, GlobalPort 0.995, Kia 0.994)	4	
10	GlobalPort Batang Pier	4	7	.364	4	
11	Kia Carnival	4	7	.364	4	
12	Blackwater Elite	3	8	.273	5	

Source: PBA.ph

=== Playoffs ===
==== Bracket ====
Quarterfinals
(#1 twice-to-beat)
1	Rain or Shine	92
8	Barangay Ginebra	91
(Best-of-3)
4	NLEX	0
5	Meralco	2
(#2 twice-to-beat)
2	Talk 'N Text	127
7	Barako Bull	97
(Best-of-3)
3	Purefoods Star	2
6	Alaska	0

Semifinals (Best-of-5)
1	Rain or Shine	3
5	Meralco	0
2	Talk 'N Text	3
3	Purefoods Star	1

Finals (Best-of-7)
1	Rain or Shine	3
2	Talk 'N Text	4

== Transactions ==
=== Trades ===
==== Pre-season ====
September 12, 2014	To Blackwater Sunday Salvacion; Jason Ballesteros (from Meralco)	To Meralco Sean Anthony (from NLEX via Blackwater)	To NLEX Juneric Baloria; 2016 & 2017 2nd round picks (from Blackwater)
October 9, 2014	To Blackwater Larry Rodriguez and 2015 1st round pick (from Talk 'N Text)	To NLEX Niño Canaleta (from Talk 'N Text via Blackwater)	To Talk 'N Text Kevin Alas (from NLEX) and 2015 1st round pick (from Blackwater)

==== Commissioner's Cup ====
March 24, 2015	To Blackwater Reil Cervantes	To KIA Alex Nuyles

==== Governors' Cup ====
July 2, 2015	To Blackwater Carlo Lastimosa	To Barako Bull Brian Heruela

=== Recruited imports ===
Tournament	Name	Debuted	Last game	Record
Commissioner's Cup	Marcus Douthit	February 1 (vs Barako Bull)	March 25 (vs Meralco)	3–7
Governors' Cup	Marcus Douthit	May 5 (vs Alaska)	June 3 (vs Rain or Shine)	1–6
Governors' Cup	Marcus Cousin	June 12 (vs Talk 'N Text)	June 23 (vs Star)	0–4
