= List of Blackwater Bossing seasons =

The Blackwater Bossing joined the Philippine Basketball Association (PBA) in 2014 after Ever Bilena, Inc. was granted an expansion team. The team began play as the Blackwater Elite in the 2014–15 PBA season.

== Records per conference ==
Note: Statistics are correct as of the end of the 2025 PBA Philippine Cup.

Conference champions	Conference runners-up	Conference semifinalists	Playoff berth	Eighth seed playoff

Season	Conference	Elimination round						Playoffs	
Season	Conference	Finish	Played	Wins	Losses	Win %	GB	Round	Results
Blackwater Elite
2014–15 (team)	Philippine	12th	11	0	11	.000	9	Did not qualify	
2014–15 (team)	Commissioner's	12th	11	3	8	.273	5	Did not qualify	
2014–15 (team)	Governors'	12th	11	1	10	.091	7	Did not qualify	
2015–16 (team)	Philippine	10th	11	3	8	.273	6	Quarterfinals 1	lost vs. Rain or Shine, 90–95 (Note: Opposing team had a twice-to-beat advantage.)
2015–16 (team)	Commissioner's	10th	11	3	8	.273	5	Did not qualify	
2015–16 (team)	Governors'	12th	11	1	10	.091	9	Did not qualify	
2016–17 (team)	Philippine	9th	11	5	6	.455	5	Eighth seed playoff	lost vs. Rain or Shine, 80–103
2016–17 (team)	Commissioner's	11th	11	2	9	.182	7	Did not qualify	
2016–17 (team)	Governors'	8th	11	5	6	.455	4	Quarterfinals	lost vs. Meralco in two games
2017–18 (team)	Philippine	10th	11	5	6	.455	3	Did not qualify	
2017–18 (team)	Commissioner's	12th	11	1	10	.091	8	Did not qualify	
2017–18 (team)	Governors'	5th	11	7	4	.636	2	Quarterfinals	lost vs. Magnolia, 99–103
2019 (team)	Philippine	12th	11	2	9	.182	7	Did not qualify	
2019 (team)	Commissioner's	3rd	11	7	4	.636	3	Quarterfinals	lost vs. Rain or Shine, 1–2
2019 (team)	Governors'	12th	11	2	9	.182	6	Did not qualify	
2020 (team)	Philippine	10th	11	2	9	.182	6	Did not qualify	
Blackwater Bossing
2021 (team)	Philippine	12th	11	0	11	.000	10	Did not qualify	
2021 (team)	Governors'	12th	11	1	10	.091	8	Did not qualify	
2022–23 (team)	Philippine	8th	11	5	6	.455	4	Quarterfinals	lost vs. San Miguel, 93–123
2022–23 (team)	Commissioner's	12th	12	3	9	.250	7	Did not qualify	
2022–23 (team)	Governors'	12th	11	1	10	.091	9	Did not qualify	
2023–24 (team)	Commissioner's	11th	11	1	10	.091	8	Did not qualify	
2023–24 (team)	Philippine	10th	11	4	7	.364	6	Did not qualify	
2024–25 (team)	Governors'	5th (Group B)	10	5	5	.500	2	Did not qualify	
2024–25 (team)	Commissioner's	11th	12	3	9	.250	6	Did not qualify	
2024–25 (team)	Philippine	10th	11	2	9	.182	6	Did not qualify	
Elimination round record			287	74	213	.258		6 playoff appearances	
Playoff record			9	2	7	.222		0 finals appearances	
Cumulative record			296	76	220	.257		0 championships	

== Records per season ==
Note: Statistics are correct as of the end of the 2025 PBA Philippine Cup.

Season	Stage	Played	Wins	Losses	Win %	Best finish
2014–15 (team)	Elimination round	33	4	29	.121	Elimination round (12th place)
2014–15 (team)	Playoffs	Did not qualify				Elimination round (12th place)
2014–15 (team)	Overall	33	4	29	.121	Elimination round (12th place)
2015–16 (team)	Elimination round	33	7	26	.212	Quarterfinals
2015–16 (team)	Playoffs	1	0	1	.000	Quarterfinals
2015–16 (team)	Overall	34	7	27	.206	Quarterfinals
2016–17 (team)	Elimination round	33	12	21	.364	Quarterfinals
2016–17 (team)	Playoffs	3	1	2	.333	Quarterfinals
2016–17 (team)	Overall	36	13	23	.361	Quarterfinals
2017–18 (team)	Elimination round	33	13	20	.394	Quarterfinals
2017–18 (team)	Playoffs	1	0	1	.000	Quarterfinals
2017–18 (team)	Overall	34	13	21	.382	Quarterfinals
2019 (team)	Elimination round	33	11	22	.333	Quarterfinals
2019 (team)	Playoffs	3	1	2	.333	Quarterfinals
2019 (team)	Overall	36	12	24	.333	Quarterfinals
2020 (team)	Elimination round	11	2	9	.182	Elimination round (10th place)
2020 (team)	Playoffs	Did not qualify				Elimination round (10th place)
2020 (team)	Overall	11	2	9	.182	Elimination round (10th place)
2021 (team)	Elimination round	22	1	21	.045	Elimination round (12th place)
2021 (team)	Playoffs	Did not qualify				Elimination round (12th place)
2021 (team)	Overall	22	1	21	.045	Elimination round (12th place)
2022–23 (team)	Elimination round	34	9	25	.265	Quarterfinals
2022–23 (team)	Playoffs	1	0	1	.000	Quarterfinals
2022–23 (team)	Overall	35	9	26	.257	Quarterfinals
2023–24 (team)	Elimination round	22	5	17	.227	Elimination round (10th place)
2023–24 (team)	Playoffs	Did not qualify				Elimination round (10th place)
2023–24 (team)	Overall	22	5	17	.227	Elimination round (10th place)
2024–25 (team)	Elimination round	33	10	23	.303	Elimination round
2024–25 (team)	Playoffs	Did not qualify				Elimination round
2024–25 (team)	Overall	33	10	23	.303	Elimination round
