= 2017–18 PBA Philippine Cup =

Basketball tournament

- Duration: December 17, 2017 – April 6, 2018
- TV partner(s): Local: ESPN 5 TV5; PBA Rush (HD); International: AksyonTV International

Finals
- Champions: San Miguel Beermen
- Runners-up: Magnolia Hotshots Pambansang Manok

Awards
- Best Player: June Mar Fajardo (San Miguel Beermen)
- Finals MVP: June Mar Fajardo (San Miguel Beermen)

PBA Philippine Cup chronology
- < 2016–17 2019 >

PBA conference chronology
- < 2017 Governors' 2018 Commissioner's >

The 2017–18 Philippine Basketball Association (PBA) Philippine Cup was the first conference of the 2017–18 PBA season. The tournament started on December 17, 2017, and ended on April 6, 2018. The tournament does not allow teams to hire foreign players or imports.

== Format ==
The following format will be observed for the duration of the conference:

- Single-round robin eliminations; 11 games per team; Teams are then seeded by basis on win–loss records.
- Top eight teams will advance to the quarterfinals. In case of tie, playoff games will be held only for the #8 seed.
- Quarterfinals:
  - QF1: #1 vs #8 (#1 twice-to-beat)
  - QF2: #2 vs #7 (#2 twice-to-beat)
  - QF3: #3 vs #6 (best-of-3 series)
  - QF4: #4 vs #5 (best-of-3 series)
- Semifinals (best-of-7 series):
  - SF1: QF1 Winner vs. QF4 Winner
  - SF2: QF2 Winner vs. QF3 Winner
- Finals (best-of-7 series)
  - F1: SF1 Winner vs SF2 Winner

== Elimination round ==
=== Team standings ===
Pos	Team	W	L	PCT	GB	Qualification
1	San Miguel Beermen	8	3	.727 (Note: Head-to-head record: San Miguel 1–0 Magnolia)	—	Twice-to-beat in the quarterfinals
2	Magnolia Hotshots Pambansang Manok	8	3	.727	—	Twice-to-beat in the quarterfinals
3	Alaska Aces	7	4	.636	1	Best-of-three quarterfinals
4	Barangay Ginebra San Miguel	6	5	.545 (Note: Head-to-head quotient: Barangay Ginebra 1.03, Rain or Shine 1.02, NLEX 0.95)	2	Best-of-three quarterfinals
5	Rain or Shine Elasto Painters	6	5	.545	2	Best-of-three quarterfinals
6	NLEX Road Warriors	6	5	.545	2	Best-of-three quarterfinals
7	GlobalPort Batang Pier	5	6	.455 (Note: Head-to-head quotient: GlobalPort 1.14, Phoenix 1.00, TNT 0.97, Blackwater 0.89; 8th seed playoff: TNT 118–97 Phoenix)	3	Twice-to-win in the quarterfinals
8	TNT KaTropa	5	6	.455	3	Twice-to-win in the quarterfinals
9	Phoenix Fuel Masters	5	6	.455	3	
10	Blackwater Elite	5	6	.455	3	
11	Meralco Bolts	4	7	.364	4	
12	Kia Picanto	1	10	.091	7	

Source: PBA.ph
Rules for classification: 1) winning percentage; 2) if two teams are tied, head to head record; if three or more teams are tied, head-to-head goal average (quotient), if tied for 8th, one-game playoff; 3) overall quotient 4) coin toss

=== Schedule ===
Team ╲ Game	1	2	3	4	5	6	7	8	9	10	11
Alaska Aces	MAG	TNT	MER	KIA	BGSM	BWE	PHX	GP	NLEX	SMB	ROS
Barangay Ginebra San Miguel	MAG	GP	BWE	ALA	PHX	SMB	NLEX	KIA	TNT	MER	ROS
Blackwater Elite	MER	ROS	BGSM	TNT	GP	ALA	MAG	SMB	KIA	NLEX	PHX
GlobalPort Batang Pier	NLEX	BGSM	ROS	BWE	SMB	MER	ALA	TNT	MAG	KIA	PHX
Kia Picanto	NLEX	PHX	MAG	ALA	ROS	MER	TNT	BGSM	BWE	GP	SMB
Magnolia Hotshots Pambansang Manok	ALA	BGSM	KIA	NLEX	PHX	TNT	BWE	SMB	ROS	GP	MER
Meralco Bolts	BWE	SMB	ALA	TNT	KIA	GP	ROS	NLEX	PHX	BGSM	MAG
NLEX Road Warriors	KIA	GP	PHX	MAG	SMB	ROS	BGSM	MER	ALA	BWE	TNT
Phoenix Fuel Masters	SMB	KIA	NLEX	ROS	MAG	BGSM	ALA	TNT	MER	BWE	GP
Rain or Shine Elasto Painters	TNT	BWE	GP	PHX	KIA	NLEX	MER	MAG	ALA	SMB	BGSM
San Miguel Beermen	PHX	MER	TNT	NLEX	GP	BGSM	MAG	BWE	ALA	KIA	ROS
TNT KaTropa	ROS	ALA	SMB	BWE	MER	MAG	KIA	PHX	BGSM	GP	NLEX

= Win; = OT win; = Loss; = OT loss

=== Results ===
Team	ALA	BGSM	BWE	GP	KIA	MAG	MER	NLEX	PHX	ROS	SMB	TNT
Alaska		97–83	88–84	105–98*	102–65	95–108	103–98	89–96	93–75	99–95	96–109	98–106
Barangay Ginebra	—		77–94	104–97	103–77	89–78	82–84	78–81	82–87	100–92***	100–96	93–78
Blackwater	—	—		76–101	95–76	72–78	98–103	90–93	83–78	92–87	106–96	83–92
GlobalPort	—	—	—		108–91	81–96	107–88	104–115	100–104	78–70	93–107	99–84
Kia	—	—	—	—		77–124	76–105	115–119	102–125	98–94	106–108	85–90
Magnolia	—	—	—	—	—		94–65	105–94	97–91	95–101	76–77	91–83
Meralco	—	—	—	—	—	—		85–87	92–90	84–90	97–103	81–99
NLEX	—	—	—	—	—	—	—		95–102	86–97	98–109	75–101
Phoenix	—	—	—	—	—	—	—	—		99–120	96–104	74–72
Rain or Shine	—	—	—	—	—	—	—	—	—		95–80	82–79
San Miguel	—	—	—	—	—	—	—	—	—	—		88–76
TNT	—	—	—	—	—	—	—	—	—	—	—	

Legend: Blue = left column team win; Red = top row team win.
Matches with lighter background shading were decided after overtime.

== Eighth seed playoff ==
ESPN 5

March 4
6:30 pm

Box score

Phoenix Fuel Masters 97, TNT KaTropa 118
Scoring by quarter: 25–27, 24–27, 27–40, 21–24
Pts: Wright 18; Rebs: Kramer, Perkins 11; Asts: Wright 6	Pts: Rosario 18; Rebs: Castro 8 Asts: Castro 9

Smart Araneta Coliseum, Quezon City
Referees: N. Quilinguen, R. Yante, R. Gruta, A. Nubla

== Bracket ==
Quarterfinals
(#1 twice-to-beat)
1	San Miguel	106
8	TNT	93
(best-of-3)
4	Barangay Ginebra	2
5	Rain or Shine	0
(#2 twice-to-beat)
2	Magnolia	86
7	GlobalPort	79
(best-of-3)
3	Alaska	0
6	NLEX	2

Semifinals (best-of-7)
1	San Miguel	4
4	Barangay Ginebra	1
2	Magnolia	4
6	NLEX	2

Finals (best-of-7)
1	San Miguel	4
2	Magnolia	1

== Quarterfinals ==
=== (1) San Miguel vs. (8) TNT ===
ESPN 5

March 6
4:30 pm

Box score

San Miguel Beermen 106, TNT KaTropa 93
Scoring by quarter: 31–23, 21–21, 25–28, 29–21
Pts: Fajardo 35; Rebs: Fajardo 11; Asts: Ross 7	Pts: Castro, Rosario 19; Rebs: Rosario 7 Asts: Castro 8
San Miguel wins series in one game

Mall of Asia Arena, Pasay
Referees: P. Balao, S. Pineda, E. Tangkion, M. Orioste

=== (2) Magnolia vs. (7) GlobalPort ===
ESPN 5

March 6
7:00 pm

Box score

Magnolia Hotshots Pambansang Manok 86, GlobalPort Batang Pier 79
Scoring by quarter: 12–26, 22–19, 27–14, 25–20
Pts: Barroca 17; Rebs: Lee 13; Asts: Jalalon 4	Pts: Pringle 31; Rebs: Pringle, Taha 10; Asts: Romeo 6
Magnolia wins series in one game

Mall of Asia Arena, Pasay
Referees: J. Mariano, N. Guevarra, M. Flordeliza, G. Borja

=== (3) Alaska vs. (6) NLEX ===
ESPN 5

March 5
4:30 pm

Box score

Alaska Aces 99, NLEX Road Warriors 105
Scoring by quarter: 22–24, 18–26, 32–24, 27–31
Pts: Banchero 20; Rebs: Abueva 13; Asts: three players 3	Pts: Ravena 25; Rebs: Quiñahan 10; Asts: Ravena 8

Mall of Asia Arena, Pasay
Referees: N. Quilinguen, R. Gruta, M. Montoya, A. Nubla

ESPN 5

March 7
7:00 pm

Box score

Alaska Aces 83, NLEX Road Warriors 87
Scoring by quarter: 23–24, 20–25, 28–19, 12–19
Pts: Abueva 17; Rebs: Abueva 16; Asts: Casio 6	Pts: Alas 18; Rebs: Alas 9 Asts: Ravena 7
NLEX wins series, 2–0

Smart Araneta Coliseum, Quezon City
Referees: J. Mariano, R. Yante, M. Flordeliza, M. Orioste

=== (4) Barangay Ginebra vs. (5) Rain or Shine ===
ESPN 5

March 5
7:00 pm

Box score

Barangay Ginebra San Miguel 88, Rain or Shine Elasto Painters 80
Scoring by quarter: 21–23, 23–20, 24–21, 20–16
Pts: Tenorio 16; Rebs: Thompson 15; Asts: Thompson 7	Pts: Belga 17; Rebs: Norwood, Ponferada 6 Asts: Ahanmisi, Tiu 3

Mall of Asia Arena, Pasay
Referees: P. Balao, S. Pineda, R. Yante, N. Ranido

ESPN 5

March 7
4:30 pm

Box score

Barangay Ginebra San Miguel 99, Rain or Shine Elasto Painters 91
Scoring by quarter: 28–19, 15–27, 34–26, 22–19
Pts: J. Aguilar 27; Rebs: J. Aguilar 12; Asts: Mercado, Thompson 6	Pts: Ahanmisi 18; Rebs: Almazan 13; Asts: Ahanmisi 5
Barangay Ginebra wins series, 2–0

Smart Araneta Coliseum, Quezon City
Referees: N. Quilinguen, N. Guevarra, M. Montoya, J. Narandan

== Semifinals ==
=== (1) San Miguel vs. (4) Barangay Ginebra ===
ESPN 5

March 9
7:00 pm

Box score

San Miguel Beermen 102, Barangay Ginebra San Miguel 90
Scoring by quarter: 26–20, 24–21, 28–22, 24–27
Pts: Santos 23; Rebs: Santos 9 Asts: Ross 8	Pts: three players 17; Rebs: Mariano 9 Asts: Ferrer 5

Smart Araneta Coliseum, Quezon City
Referees: N. Quilinguen, N. Guevarra, S. Pineda, M. Orioste

ESPN 5

March 11
6:30 pm

Box score

San Miguel Beermen 104, Barangay Ginebra San Miguel 102 (OT)
Scoring by quarter: 25–30, 17–25, 28–18, 25–22, Overtime: 9–7
Pts: Fajardo 33; Rebs: Fajardo 19; Asts: Santos 5	Pts: J. Aguilar 28; Rebs: Thompson 9 Asts: Tenorio 7

Smart Araneta Coliseum, Quezon City
Referees: P. Balao, S. Pineda, R. Yante, J. Narandan

ESPN 5

March 13
7:00 pm

Box score

San Miguel Beermen 87, Barangay Ginebra San Miguel 95
Scoring by quarter: 15–19, 24–26, 26–34, 22–16
Pts: Fajardo 23; Rebs: Fajardo 16; Asts: Lassiter 4	Pts: J. Aguilar 25; Rebs: J. Aguilar 12; Asts: Thompson 6

Mall of Asia Arena, Pasay
Referees: N. Quilinguen, E. Tangkion, R. Gruta, M. Flordeliza

ESPN 5

March 15
7:00 pm

Box score

San Miguel Beermen 102, Barangay Ginebra San Miguel 81
Scoring by quarter: 32–22, 26–19, 26–17, 18–23
Pts: Lassiter 23; Rebs: Fajardo 13; Asts: Ganuelas-Rosser 10	Pts: J. Aguilar 31; Rebs: J. Aguilar 13; Asts: Devance, Ferrer 5

Mall of Asia Arena, Pasay
Referees: P. Balao, N. Guevarra, S. Pineda, M. Orioste

ESPN 5

March 17
6:30 pm

Box score

San Miguel Beermen 100, Barangay Ginebra San Miguel 94
Scoring by quarter: 25–34, 30–21, 28–21, 17–18
Pts: Fajardo 25; Rebs: Santos 13; Asts: Cabagnot 5	Pts: J. Aguilar 34; Rebs: Thompson 15; Asts: Thompson 16
San Miguel wins series, 4–1

Cuneta Astrodome, Pasay

=== (2) Magnolia vs. (6) NLEX ===
ESPN 5

March 10
6:30 pm

Box score

Magnolia Hotshots Pambansang Manok 87, NLEX Road Warriors 88
Scoring by quarter: 12–14, 15–18, 34–28, 26–28
Pts: Sangalang 21; Rebs: Sangalang 9 Asts: Jalalon 6	Pts: Baguio 17; Rebs: Quiñahan 9 Asts: Quiñahan 7

Smart Araneta Coliseum, Quezon City
Referees: N. Quilinguen, N. Guevarra, R. Gruta, M. Orioste

ESPN 5

March 12
7:00 pm

Box score

Magnolia Hotshots Pambansang Manok 99, NLEX Road Warriors 84
Scoring by quarter: 27–20, 21–19, 22–23, 29–22
Pts: Lee 27; Rebs: Sangalang 8 Asts: Jalalon 10	Pts: Mallari, Quiñahan 13; Rebs: Soyud 6 Asts: Ravena 7

Mall of Asia Arena, Pasay
Referees: P. Balao, N. Guevarra, R. Gruta, M. Montoya

ESPN 5

March 14
7:00 pm

Box score

Magnolia Hotshots Pambansang Manok 106, NLEX Road Warriors 99
Scoring by quarter: 24–27, 29–24, 26–27, 27–21
Pts: Jalalon 25; Rebs: Reavis 10; Asts: Lee 6	Pts: Ravena 20; Rebs: Alas 9 Asts: Quiñahan, Ravena 5

Smart Araneta Coliseum, Quezon City
Referees: J. Mariano, S. Pineda, M. Flordeliza, J. Narandan

ESPN 5

March 16
7:00 pm

Box score

Magnolia Hotshots Pambansang Manok 79, NLEX Road Warriors 91
Scoring by quarter: 20–25, 19–16, 20–28, 20–22
Pts: Sangalang 15; Rebs: Sangalang 14; Asts: Barroca 7	Pts: Ravena 20; Rebs: Alas, Miranda 6 Asts: Alas, Ravena 5

Mall of Asia Arena, Pasay
Referees: J. Mariano, E. Tangkion, M. Flordeliza, J. Narandan

ESPN 5

March 18
6:30 pm

Box score

Magnolia Hotshots Pambansang Manok 87, NLEX Road Warriors 78
Scoring by quarter: 20–20, 17–16, 22–22, 28–20
Pts: Barroca 18; Rebs: Sangalang 11; Asts: Sangalang 6	Pts: Ravena 21; Rebs: Mallari, Soyud 9 Asts: Baguio 7

Ynares Center, Antipolo
Referees: P. Balao, E. Tangkion, R. Yante, M. Orioste

ESPN 5

March 20
7:00 pm

Box score

Magnolia Hotshots Pambansang Manok 96, NLEX Road Warriors 89
Scoring by quarter: 20–29, 29–17, 22–22, 25–21
Pts: Sangalang 15; Rebs: Sangalang 11; Asts: Jalalon 13	Pts: Miranda 20; Rebs: Miranda 8 Asts: Baguio 6
Magnolia wins series, 4–2

Smart Araneta Coliseum, Quezon City
Referees: J. Mariano, N. Guevarra, R. Gruta, J. Narandan

== Finals ==
ESPN 5

March 23
7:00 pm

Box score

San Miguel Beermen 103, Magnolia Hotshots Pambansang Manok 105

Smart Araneta Coliseum, Quezon City

ESPN 5

March 25
6:30 pm

Box score

San Miguel Beermen 92, Magnolia Hotshots Pambansang Manok 77

Mall of Asia Arena, Pasay

ESPN 5

April 1
6:30 pm

Box score

San Miguel Beermen 111, Magnolia Hotshots Pambansang Manok 87

Smart Araneta Coliseum, Quezon City

ESPN 5

April 4
7:00 pm

Box score

San Miguel Beermen 84, Magnolia Hotshots Pambansang Manok 80

Smart Araneta Coliseum, Quezon City

ESPN 5

April 6
7:00 pm

Box score

San Miguel Beermen 108, Magnolia Hotshots Pambansang Manok 99 (2OT)
San Miguel wins series, 4–1

Mall of Asia Arena, Pasay

== Awards ==
=== Conference ===
- Best Player of the Conference: June Mar Fajardo (San Miguel Beermen)
- Finals MVP: June Mar Fajardo (San Miguel Beermen)

=== Players of the Week ===
Week	Player	Ref.
December 17–24	Kiefer Ravena (NLEX Road Warriors)	
December 25 – January 7	Greg Slaughter (Barangay Ginebra San Miguel)	
January 8–14	Paul Lee (Magnolia Hotshots Pambansang Manok)	
January 15–21	Roger Pogoy (TNT KaTropa)	
January 22–28	Willy Wilson (Phoenix Fuel Masters)	
January 29 – February 4	Vic Manuel (Alaska Aces)	
February 5–11	Kiefer Ravena (NLEX Road Warriors)	
February 12–18	Garvo Lanete (Meralco Bolts)	
February 19–24	JVee Casio (Alaska Aces)	
February 25 – March 4	Jericho Cruz (TNT KaTropa)	
March 6–11	Marcio Lassiter (San Miguel Beermen)	
March 12–18	June Mar Fajardo (San Miguel Beermen)	

== Statistics ==
=== Individual statistical leaders ===
Category	Player	Team	Statistic
Points per game	June Mar Fajardo	San Miguel Beermen	23.8
Rebounds per game	John Paul Erram	Blackwater Elite	13.8
Assists per game	Scottie Thompson	Barangay Ginebra San Miguel	6.2
Steals per game	Chris Ross	San Miguel Beermen	2.2
Blocks per game	John Paul Erram	Blackwater Elite	3.0
Turnovers per game	June Mar Fajardo	San Miguel Beermen	4.2
Fouls per game	Chris Newsome	Meralco Bolts	3.7
Fouls per game	Calvin Abueva	Alaska Aces	3.7
Minutes per game	Arwind Santos	San Miguel Beermen	39.7
FG%	Matt Ganuelas-Rosser	San Miguel Beermen	62.1%
FT%	Chris Newsome	Meralco Bolts	91.3%
3FG%	Michael DiGregorio	Blackwater Elite	48.1%
3FG%	Gelo Alolino	Phoenix Fuel Masters	48.1%
Double-doubles	June Mar Fajardo	San Miguel Beermen	16
Triple-doubles	JVee Casio	Alaska Aces	1
Triple-doubles	Scottie Thompson	Barangay Ginebra San Miguel	1
Triple-doubles	Chris Ross	San Miguel Beermen	1

=== Individual game highs ===
Category	Player	Team	Statistic
Points	June Mar Fajardo	San Miguel Beermen	42
Rebounds	John Paul Erram	Blackwater Elite	21
Rebounds	June Mar Fajardo	San Miguel Beermen	21
Assists	Scottie Thompson	Barangay Ginebra San Miguel	16
Steals	Chris Ross	San Miguel Beermen	8
Blocks	John Paul Erram	Blackwater Elite	7
Three point field goals	Paul Lee (twice)	Magnolia Hotshots Pambansang Manok	6
Three point field goals	Sean Anthony	GlobalPort Batang Pier	6
Three point field goals	Troy Rosario	TNT KaTropa	6
Three point field goals	KG Canaleta	Meralco Bolts	6
Three point field goals	Ronald Tubid	Kia Picanto	6
Three point field goals	Arwind Santos	San Miguel Beermen	6

=== Team statistical leaders ===
Category	Team	Statistic
Points per game	San Miguel Beermen	98.9
Rebounds per game	GlobalPort Batang Pier	56.8
Assists per game	Barangay Ginebra San Miguel	24.7
Steals per game	Phoenix Fuel Masters	10.4
Blocks per game	San Miguel Beermen	6.5
Turnovers per game	Barangay Ginebra San Miguel	19.7
FG%	San Miguel Beermen	44.4%
FT%	Meralco Bolts	76.4%
3FG%	Meralco Bolts	34.8%
