= 2014 PBA expansion draft =

General information
- Date: July 18, 2014
- Location: Microtel Acropolis, Libis, Quezon City

Overview
- League: Philippine Basketball Association
- Expansion teams: Blackwater Elite; Kia Sorento

The 2014 PBA expansion draft was the third expansion draft of the Philippine Basketball Association (PBA). The draft was held on July 18, 2014, so that the newly founded teams Blackwater Elite and the Kia Sorento could acquire players for the 2014–15 season. A "protect 12" scheme was implemented for the draft, meaning that the 10 existing PBA teams could protect up to 12 players in their rosters and unconditionally release their unprotected players to the expansion pool. This was the first expansion draft held by the PBA since 2000, when Batang Red Bull Energizers entered the league as an expansion team. The draft was closed to the public as the final list was distributed only to the expansion clubs. Players involved would be returned to their original teams if they were not chosen, provided they were unaware of their inclusion in the draft.

Blackwater Elite were formed as one of the founding members of the PBA Developmental League in 2011. They were only the D-League team, besides the NLEX Road Warriors to win a championship, which they won in the 2013 PBA D-League Foundation Cup. The team is owned by Dioceldo Sy, through his company, Ever Bilena Cosmetics, Inc. Sy also owned the Blu Detergent team in the Philippine Basketball League, who hired Asi Taulava before turning professional in 1999.

The Kia Sorento were formed after the approval of the league's board of governors on their expansion application, together with Blackwater and NLEX. The team is owned by Columbian Autocar Corporation, the local distributor of Kia cars in the Philippines. On June 9, 2014, the team held a press conference, announcing that boxer Manny Pacquiao would coach their team in the 2014–15 season. A naming contest was held to determine the team's moniker. On August 24, during the 2014 PBA draft, Columbian Autocar Corporation president Gina Domingo announced that they took the moniker "Sorento", the name of their top-selling sports utility vehicle in the Philippines and United States.

The NLEX Road Warriors were supposed to be part of this expansion draft, but they opted to buy the Air21 Express. NLEX started as a founding member of the PBA D-League and won six championships, most recently the 2014 Foundation Cup, when they swept Blackwater Elite in their finals series.

== Key ==
Pos.	G	F	C
Position	Guard	Forward	Center

== Selections ==
The draft was supposed to be held at the PBA office in Libis, Quezon City, but due to the rotational power cuts caused by the aftermath of Typhoon Glenda (international name Rammasun), the draft was held at Microtel Acropolis, which across Circumferential Road 5 from the league's offices.

Pick	Player	Pos.	Country of birth	Team	Previous team	PBA years^{[a]}	Career with the franchise^{[b]}
1	Danny Ildefonso	C	Philippines	Blackwater Elite	Meralco Bolts	16	—^{[d]}
2	Reil Cervantes	F	Philippines	Kia Sorento	Barako Bull Energy	3	2014–15
3	Alex Nuyles	G	Philippines	Blackwater Elite	Rain or Shine Elasto Painters	1	2014–15
4	Mike Burtscher	F	Switzerland	Kia Sorento	Air21 Express	5	2014–15
5	JR Cawaling	F	Philippines	Blackwater Elite	San Mig Super Coffee Mixers	1	2014
6	Hans Thiele	C/F	Philippines	Kia Sorento	Barako Bull Energy	4	2014–15
7	Eddie Laure	F	Philippines	Blackwater Elite	Alaska Aces	11	2014–15
8	Alvin Padilla	G	Philippines	Kia Sorento	Barangay Ginebra San Miguel	0^{[c]}	2014
9	Bryan Faundo	F	Philippines	Blackwater Elite	Barangay Ginebra San Miguel	5	2014–15
10	Jai Reyes	G	Philippines	Kia Sorento	Talk 'N Text Tropang Texters	5	—^{[d]}
11	John Paul Erram	C	Philippines	Blackwater Elite	Talk 'N Text Tropang Texters	0^{[c]}	2014–18
12	Paul Sanga	F	Philippines	Kia Sorento	undrafted	0^{[c]}	2014
13	Paul Artadi	G	Philippines	Blackwater Elite	Meralco Bolts	10	2014
14	Bogs Raymundo	F	Philippines	Kia Sorento	GlobalPort Batang Pier	2	2014
15	Gilbert Bulawan	F	Philippines	Blackwater Elite	Barako Bull Energy	3	2014–16
16	Eder John Saldua	G	Philippines	Kia Sorento	undrafted	0^{[c]}	2014
17	Riego Gamalinda	G	Philippines	Blackwater Elite	Talk 'N Text Tropang Texters	4	2014–17
18	Nic Belasco	F	United States	Kia Sorento	Alaska Aces	17	—^{[d]}
19	Chris Timberlake	G	United States	Blackwater Elite	Meralco Bolts	5	2014–15
20	LA Revilla	G	Philippines	Kia Sorento	GlobalPort Batang Pier	1	2014–17
21	Norman Gonzales	F	Philippines	Blackwater Elite	Powerade Tigers	13	—^{[d]}
22	Joshua Webb	G	Philippines	Kia Sorento	Air21 Express	0^{[c]}	2014–15
23	Robby Celiz	G	Philippines	Blackwater Elite	Talk 'N Text Tropang Texters	1	2014–15
24	Richard Alonzo	F	Philippines	Kia Sorento	GlobalPort Batang Pier	8	2014

== Notes ==
- ^{a} Number of years played in the PBA prior to the draft
- ^{b} Career with the expansion franchise that drafted the player
- ^{c} Never played in the PBA prior to the expansion draft
- ^{d} Never played a game for the franchise
