= Raphy Reyes =

Filipino basketball player

Free agent
- Position: Point guard

Personal information
- Born: December 1, 1987 (age 38)
- Listed height: 5 ft 10 in (1.78 m)
- Listed weight: 165 lb (75 kg)

Career information
- College: UE
- PBA draft: 2012: 2nd round, 17th overall pick
- Drafted by: Alaska Aces
- Playing career: 2012–present

Career history
- 2012–2014: Alaska Aces
- 2014–2016: Blackwater Elite
- 2019–2020: Zamboanga Family's Brand Sardines
- 2021–2024: Bicol Volcanoes / Bicolandia Oragons

Career highlights
- PBA champion (2013 Commissioner's)

Raphael Carlo "Raphy" Reyes is a Filipino professional basketball player who last played for the Bicolandia Oragons of the Maharlika Pilipinas Basketball League (MPBL). He is a former UE Red Warrior and the point guard for the Big Chill Super Chargers in the PBA D-League. He was drafted 19th overall in the 2012 PBA draft by the Alaska Aces.

== PBA career statistics ==
Legend
| GP | Games played | MPG | Minutes per game |
| FG% | Field-goal percentage | 3P% | 3-point field-goal percentage | FT% | Free-throw percentage |
| RPG | Rebounds per game | APG | Assists per game | SPG | Steals per game |
| BPG | Blocks per game | PPG | Points per game | **Bold** | Career high |

=== Season-by-season averages ===
| Year | Team | GP | MPG | FG% | 3P% | FT% | RPG | APG | SPG | BPG | PPG |
|---|---|---|---|---|---|---|---|---|---|---|---|
| 2012–13 | Alaska | **34** | 7.9 | .469 | .312 | **.857** | .4 | .7 | .3 | .0 | 2.4 |
| 2013–14 | Alaska | 14 | 5.0 | **.533** | .000 | .500 | .4 | .4 | .3 | .0 | 1.2 |
| 2014–15 | Blackwater | 21 | **16.5** | .396 | .317 | .759 | **1.3** | **1.6** | **.4** | .0 | **5.3** |
| 2015–16 | Blackwater | 32 | 15.3 | .444 | **.371** | .750 | 1.1 | .8 | **.4** | .0 | 5.0 |
| Career | | 101 | 11.6 | .438 | .342 | .779 | .8 | .9 | .4 | .0 | 3.7 |
