= 2019 PBA Philippine Cup =

- Duration: January 13 – May 15, 2019
- TV partner(s): Local: ESPN5; 5 PBA Rush (HD); International: AksyonTV International

Finals
- Champions: San Miguel Beermen
- Runners-up: Magnolia Hotshots Pambansang Manok

Awards
- Best Player: June Mar Fajardo (San Miguel Beermen)
- Finals MVP: June Mar Fajardo (San Miguel Beermen)

PBA Philippine Cup chronology
- < 2017–18 2020 >

PBA conference chronology
- < 2018 Governors' 2019 Commissioner's >

The 2019 Philippine Basketball Association (PBA) Philippine Cup, also known as the 2019 Honda Click–PBA Philippine Cup for sponsorship reasons, was the first conference of the 2019 PBA season of the Philippine Basketball Association (PBA). The 41st PBA Philippine Cup began on January 13 and ended on May 15, 2019. The tournament does not allow teams to hire foreign players or imports.

== Format ==
The following format will be observed for the duration of the conference:

- Single-round robin eliminations; 11 games per team; Teams are then seeded by basis on win–loss records.
- Top eight teams will advance to the quarterfinals. In case of tie, playoff games will be held only for the #8 seed.
- Quarterfinals:
  - QF1: #1 vs #8 (#1 twice-to-beat)
  - QF2: #2 vs #7 (#2 twice-to-beat)
  - QF3: #3 vs #6 (best-of-3 series)
  - QF4: #4 vs #5 (best-of-3 series)
- Semifinals (best-of-7 series):
  - SF1: QF1 Winner vs. QF4 Winner
  - SF2: QF2 Winner vs. QF3 Winner
- Finals (best-of-7 series)
  - F1: SF1 Winner vs SF2 Winner

== Elimination round ==
=== Team standings ===
Pos	Team	W	L	PCT	GB	Qualification
1	Phoenix Pulse Fuel Masters	9	2	.818	—	Twice-to-beat in the quarterfinals
2	Rain or Shine Elasto Painters	8	3	.727	1	Twice-to-beat in the quarterfinals
3	Barangay Ginebra San Miguel	7	4	.636 (Note: Head-to-head quotient: Barangay Ginebra 1.02, TNT 1.00, San Miguel 0.98)	2	Best-of-three quarterfinals
4	TNT KaTropa	7	4	.636	2	Best-of-three quarterfinals
5	San Miguel Beermen	7	4	.636	2	Best-of-three quarterfinals
6	Magnolia Hotshots Pambansang Manok	6	5	.545	3	Best-of-three quarterfinals
7	NorthPort Batang Pier	5	6	.455	4	Twice-to-win in the quarterfinals
8	Alaska Aces	4	7	.364 (Note: Head-to-head quotient: NLEX 1.19, Alaska 1.01, Columbian 0.84; 8th-seed playoff: Alaska 88–80 NLEX)	5	Twice-to-win in the quarterfinals
9	NLEX Road Warriors	4	7	.364	5	
10	Columbian Dyip	4	7	.364	5	
11	Meralco Bolts	3	8	.273	6	
12	Blackwater Elite	2	9	.182	7	

Source: PBA.ph
Rules for classification: 1) winning percentage; 2) if two teams are tied, head-to-head record; if three or more teams are tied, head-to-head goal average (quotient), if tied for 8th, one-game playoff; 3) overall quotient 4) coin toss

=== Schedule ===
Team ╲ Game	1	2	3	4	5	6	7	8	9	10	11
Alaska	ROS	COL	BWE	PHX	BGSM	MAG	NLEX	TNT	MER	SMB	NP
Barangay Ginebra	TNT	SMB	ROS	COL	BWE	ALA	PHX	MAG	NLEX	MER	NP
Blackwater	NP	MER	ROS	PHX	SMB	BGSM	ALA	COL	TNT	NLEX	MAG
Columbian	SMB	PHX	NP	NLEX	BGSM	ALA	MER	BWE	ROS	MAG	TNT
Magnolia	TNT	SMB	ROS	MER	PHX	ALA	COL	BGSM	NP	BWE	NLEX
Meralco	PHX	BWE	SMB	TNT	NLEX	COL	MAG	NP	ROS	ALA	BGSM
NLEX	ROS	NP	TNT	COL	MER	PHX	SMB	ALA	BWE	BGSM	MAG
NorthPort	BWE	NLEX	COL	ROS	PHX	MER	SMB	MAG	TNT	ALA	BGSM
Phoenix	MER	TNT	COL	BWE	NLEX	ROS	NP	ALA	MAG	BGSM	SMB
Rain or Shine	NLEX	BGSM	BWE	SMB	ALA	NP	PHX	MAG	TNT	COL	MER
San Miguel	COL	BGSM	MER	TNT	ROS	BWE	MAG	NLEX	NP	PHX	ALA
TNT KaTropa	BGSM	PHX	NLEX	SMB	MER	MAG	ROS	BWE	ALA	COL	NP

= Win; = OT win; = Loss; = OT loss

=== Results ===
Teams	ALA	BGSM	BWE	COL	MAG	MER	NLEX	NP	PHX	ROS	SMB	TNT
Alaska	—	104–78	103–101	94–72	86–103	92–77	70–91	84–94	80–94	72–85	96–114	78–92
Barangay Ginebra	—	—	85–67	97–85	97–93*	86–76	105–96	97–100	100–97	80–83	91–99	90–79
Blackwater	—	—	—	106–100	87–97	94–99	101–122	91–117	95–114	111–99	79–93	89–127
Columbian	—	—	—	—	83–109	86–85	97–107	110–100	98–108	85–82	124–118	98–101
Magnolia	—	—	—	—	—	92–86	102–74	103–90	87–89	74–75	92–113	75–80*
Meralco	—	—	—	—	—	—	83–87	126–123**	92–93*	85–88	93–105	88–77
NLEX	—	—	—	—	—	—	—	90–95	82–83	87–96	111–121	80–85
NorthPort	—	—	—	—	—	—	—	—	96–98	100–107	107–113	109–83
Phoenix Pulse	—	—	—	—	—	—	—	—	—	94–98*	96–93	93–84*
Rain or Shine	—	—	—	—	—	—	—	—	—	—	108–98	92–100
San Miguel	—	—	—	—	—	—	—	—	—	—	—	93–104
TNT	—	—	—	—	—	—	—	—	—	—	—	—

Source: PBA.ph
Legend: Blue = left column team win; Red = top row team win.
Matches with lighter background shading were decided after overtime.

== Eighth seed playoff ==
ESPN 5

April 5
7:00 pm

Box score

Alaska Aces 88, NLEX Road Warriors 80
Scoring by quarter: 23–17, 21–8, 29–25, 15–30
Pts: Thoss 21; Rebs: Teng 7 Asts: Enciso 6	Pts: Ighalo 16; Rebs: Erram 19; Asts: Erram 4

Mall of Asia Arena, Pasay
Referees: P. Balao, E. Tangkion, M. Montoya, J. Borja

== Bracket ==
Quarterfinals
(#1 twice-to-beat)
1	Phoenix	91
8	Alaska	76
(best-of-3)
4	TNT	1
5	San Miguel	2
(#2 twice-to-beat)
2	Rain or Shine	91
7	NorthPort	85
(best-of-3)
3	Barangay Ginebra	1
6	Magnolia	2

Semifinals (best-of-7)
1	Phoenix	1
5	San Miguel	4
2	Rain or Shine	3
6	Magnolia	4

Finals (best-of-7)
5	San Miguel	4
6	Magnolia	3

== Quarterfinals ==
=== (1) Phoenix vs. (8) Alaska ===
Phoenix, with the twice-to-beat advantage, only has to win once, while its opponent, Alaska, has to win twice.

ESPN 5

April 7
6:45 PM

Box score

Phoenix Pulse Fuel Masters 91, Alaska Aces 76
Scoring by quarter: 18–15, 29–20, 25–14, 19–27
Pts: Perkins 31; Rebs: Abueva 11; Asts: Wright 6	Pts: Casio 19; Rebs: Baclao 7 Asts: three players 2
Phoenix wins series in one game

Mall of Asia Arena, Pasay
Referees: P. Balao, R. Gruta, M. Orioste, N. Cortez

=== (2) Rain or Shine vs. (7) NorthPort ===
Rain or Shine, with the twice-to-beat advantage, only has to win once, while its opponent, NorthPort, has to win twice.

ESPN 5

April 7
4:30 PM

Box score

Rain or Shine Elasto Painters 91, NorthPort Batang Pier 85
Scoring by quarter: 14–17, 29–16, 30–29, 18–23
Pts: Daquioag 15; Rebs: Mocon 7 Asts: Belga, Daquioag 4	Pts: Tautuaa 24; Rebs: Pringle 11; Asts: Pringle 6
Rain or Shine wins series in one game

Mall of Asia Arena, Pasay
Referees: E. Tangkion, B. Oliva, M. Flordeliza, J. Tantay

=== (3) Barangay Ginebra vs. (6) Magnolia ===
This is a best-of-three playoff.

ESPN 5

April 6
6:45 PM

Box score

Barangay Ginebra San Miguel 86, Magnolia Hotshots Pambansang Manok 75
Scoring by quarter: 17–18, 27–9, 18–20, 24–28
Pts: Slaughter 15; Rebs: Slaughter 12; Asts: J. Aguilar, Tenorio 7	Pts: Lee 15; Rebs: Brondial 9 Asts: three players 3

Mall of Asia Arena, Pasay
Referees: E. Tangkion, M. Montoya, M. Flordeliza, J. Baldago

ESPN 5

April 8
4:30 PM

Box score

Barangay Ginebra San Miguel 77, Magnolia Hotshots Pambansang Manok 106
Scoring by quarter: 18–25, 20–26, 16–30, 23–25
Pts: Mercado 13; Rebs: J. Aguilar 7 Asts: Thompson 4	Pts: Sangalang 21; Rebs: Sangalang 9 Asts: Jalalon 6

Smart Araneta Coliseum, Quezon City
Referees: J. Mariano, R. Gruta, J. Narandan, N. Cortes

ESPN 5

April 10
7:00 PM

Box score

Barangay Ginebra San Miguel 72, Magnolia Hotshots Pambansang Manok 85
Scoring by quarter: 23–20, 14–22, 13–28, 22–15
Pts: Chan 17; Rebs: Thompson 19; Asts: Tenorio, Thompson 7	Pts: Lee 25; Rebs: Sangalang 10; Asts: Jalalon 6
Magnolia wins series, 2–1

Smart Araneta Coliseum, Quezon City
Attendance: 11,147
Referees: S. Pineda, R. Yante, M. Montoya, J. Nicandro

=== (4) TNT vs. (5) San Miguel ===
This is a best-of-three playoff.

ESPN 5

April 6
4:30 PM

Box score

TNT KaTropa 78, San Miguel Beermen 80
Scoring by quarter: 22–13, 24–26, 19–21, 13–20
Pts: Rosario 23; Rebs: Rosario, Williams 9 Asts: Castro 7	Pts: three players 15; Rebs: Fajardo, Standhardinger 10; Asts: Ross 6

Mall of Asia Arena, Pasay
Referees: P. Balao, B. Oliva, J. Narandan, J. Tantay

ESPN 5

April 8
7:00 PM

Box score

TNT KaTropa 93, San Miguel Beermen 88
Scoring by quarter: 20–19, 34–24, 19–25, 20–20
Pts: Pogoy 20; Rebs: Rosario 12; Asts: Castro 9	Pts: Fajardo 26; Rebs: Fajardo 19; Asts: Ross 6

Smart Araneta Coliseum, Quezon City
Referees: R. Yante, S. Pineda, M. Montoya, J. Baldago

ESPN 5

April 10
4:30 PM

Box score

TNT KaTropa 86, San Miguel Beermen 96
Scoring by quarter: 10–25, 17–28, 28–24, 31–19
Pts: Pogoy 16; Rebs: Taha 13; Asts: Heruela 4	Pts: Fajardo 32; Rebs: Fajardo 14; Asts: Lassiter 6
San Miguel wins series, 2–1

Smart Araneta Coliseum, Quezon City
Attendance: 11,147
Referees: P. Balao, J. Mariano, M. Orioste, J. Tantay

== Semifinals ==
=== (1) Phoenix vs. (5) San Miguel ===
ESPN 5

April 13
6:30 PM

Box score

Phoenix Pulse Fuel Masters 88, San Miguel Beermen 100
Scoring by quarter: 27–21, 12–28, 20–32, 29–19
Pts: Wright 22; Rebs: Abueva 21; Asts: Abueva 5	Pts: Cabagnot 26; Rebs: Standhardinger 16; Asts: Cabagnot 7

Mall of Asia Arena, Pasay
Referees: P. Balao, R. Gruta, M. Orioste, J. Tantay

ESPN 5

April 15
7:00 PM

Box score

Phoenix Pulse Fuel Masters 82, San Miguel Beermen 92
Scoring by quarter: 21–13, 25–24, 17–26, 19–29
Pts: Abueva 16; Rebs: Abueva 10; Asts: Abueva 6	Pts: Lassiter 24; Rebs: Fajardo 18; Asts: Fajardo 4

Smart Araneta Coliseum, Quezon City
Referees: N. Quilinguen, S. Pineda, R. Yante, M. Montoya

ESPN 5

April 21
6:30 PM

Box score

Phoenix Pulse Fuel Masters 92, San Miguel Beermen 90
Scoring by quarter: 21–19, 19–17, 24–30, 28–24
Pts: Abueva, Wright 18; Rebs: Abueva 13; Asts: Abueva 5	Pts: Fajardo 22; Rebs: Fajardo 19; Asts: Cabagnot 6

Smart Araneta Coliseum, Quezon City
Referees: P. Balao, J. Mariano, M. Orioste, J. Baldago

ESPN 5

April 23
7:00 PM

Box score

Phoenix Pulse Fuel Masters 91, San Miguel Beermen 114
Scoring by quarter: 20–27, 28–32, 15–30, 28–25
Pts: Abueva 19; Rebs: Abueva 15; Asts: four players 3	Pts: Cabagnot 18; Rebs: Santos 8 Asts: Ganuelas-Rosser, Ross 7

Cuneta Astrodome, Pasay
Referees: N. Quilinguen, S. Pineda, R. Gruta, M. Flordeliza

ESPN 5

April 25
7:00 PM

Box score

Phoenix Pulse Fuel Masters 94, San Miguel Beermen 105
Scoring by quarter: 15–22, 24–29, 31–34, 24–20
Pts: Wright 20; Rebs: Chua 11; Asts: Revilla 6	Pts: Ross 24; Rebs: Fajardo 16; Asts: Cabagnot 7
San Miguel wins series, 4–1

Cuneta Astrodome, Pasay
Referees: P. Balao, J. Mariano, M. Orioste, J. Tantay

=== (2) Rain or Shine vs. (6) Magnolia ===
ESPN 5

April 12
7:00 PM

Box score

Rain or Shine Elasto Painters 84, Magnolia Hotshots Pambansang Manok 77
Scoring by quarter: 19–16, 14–21, 28–21, 23–19
Pts: Mocon 15; Rebs: Mocon 10; Asts: Nambatac 4	Pts: Lee 15; Rebs: Reavis 10; Asts: Lee 6

Smart Araneta Coliseum, Quezon City
Referees: P. Balao, R. Yante, R. Gruta, J. Borja

ESPN 5

April 14
6:30 PM

Box score

Rain or Shine Elasto Painters 93, Magnolia Hotshots Pambansang Manok 80
Scoring by quarter: 19–18, 31–23, 23–16, 20–23
Pts: Daquioag 19; Rebs: Mocon 6 Asts: Norwood 5	Pts: Herndon, Sangalang 13; Rebs: Jalalon 8 Asts: Jalalon 5

Smart Araneta Coliseum, Quezon City
Referees: J. Mariano, S. Pineda, J. Narandan, J. Baldago

ESPN 5

April 16
7:00 PM

Box score

Rain or Shine Elasto Painters 74, Magnolia Hotshots Pambansang Manok 85
Scoring by quarter: 17–15, 25–20, 21–22, 11–28
Pts: Mocon 18; Rebs: Mocon, Norwood 9 Asts: Norwood 4	Pts: Lee, Sangalang 16; Rebs: Reavis, Sangalang 11; Asts: Barroca 6

Smart Araneta Coliseum, Quezon City
Referees: N. Quilingen, M. Montoya, M. Flordeliza, J. Nicandro

ESPN 5

April 22
7:00 PM

Box score

Rain or Shine Elasto Painters 91, Magnolia Hotshots Pambansang Manok 94
Scoring by quarter: 20–28, 17–28, 27–24, 27–14
Pts: Yap 24; Rebs: Norwood 8 Asts: Belga 3	Pts: Sangalang 19; Rebs: Reavis 11; Asts: Jalalon 4

Smart Araneta Coliseum, Quezon City
Referees: P. Balao, R. Gruta, J. Narandan, J. Baldago

ESPN 5

April 24
7:00 PM

Box score

Rain or Shine Elasto Painters 74, Magnolia Hotshots Pambansang Manok 82
Scoring by quarter: 10–16, 24–24, 23–18, 17–24
Pts: Norwood 15; Rebs: Belga 10; Asts: three players 3	Pts: Barroca, Jalalon 14; Rebs: Reavis 12; Asts: Barroca, Jalalon 3

Cuneta Astrodome, Pasay
Referees: N. Quilinguen, M. Montoya, M. Flordeliza, M. Orioste

ESPN 5

April 26
7:00 PM

Box score

Rain or Shine Elasto Painters 91, Magnolia Hotshots Pambansang Manok 81
Scoring by quarter: 21–17, 20–18, 21–27, 29–19
Pts: Nambatac, Yap 16; Rebs: Norwood 10; Asts: Ahanmisi, Belga 4	Pts: Sangalang 19; Rebs: Reavis, Sangalang 8 Asts: Jalalon 8

Ynares Center, Antipolo
Referees: P. Balao, S. Pineda, R. Gruta, J. Narandan

ESPN 5

April 28
6:30 PM

Box score

Rain or Shine Elasto Painters 60, Magnolia Hotshots Pambansang Manok 63 (OT)
Scoring by quarter: 7–14, 20–7, 17–16, 11–18, Overtime: 5–8
Pts: Yap 14; Rebs: Ahanmisi, Norwood 7 Asts: Norwood 4	Pts: Lee, Sangalang 11; Rebs: Reavis 20; Asts: Jalalon 4
Magnolia wins series, 4–3

Mall of Asia Arena, Pasay
Referees: N. Quilinguen, S. Pineda, R. Yante, M. Orioste

== Finals ==
ESPN 5

May 1
7:00pm

Box score

San Miguel Beermen 94, Magnolia Hotshots Pambansang Manok 99

Smart Araneta Coliseum, Quezon City

ESPN 5

May 3
7:00pm

Box score

San Miguel Beermen 108, Magnolia Hotshots Pambansang Manok 101

Smart Araneta Coliseum, Quezon City

ESPN 5

May 5
6:30pm

Box score

San Miguel Beermen 82, Magnolia Hotshots Pambansang Manok 86

Smart Araneta Coliseum, Quezon City

ESPN 5

May 8
7:00pm

Box score

San Miguel Beermen 114, Magnolia Hotshots Pambansang Manok 98

Smart Araneta Coliseum, Quezon City

ESPN 5

May 10
7:00pm

Box score

San Miguel Beermen 86, Magnolia Hotshots Pambansang Manok 88

Smart Araneta Coliseum, Quezon City

ESPN 5

May 12
6:30pm

Box score

San Miguel Beermen 98, Magnolia Hotshots Pambansang Manok 86

Smart Araneta Coliseum, Quezon City

ESPN 5

May 15
7:00pm

Box score

San Miguel Beermen 72, Magnolia Hotshots Pambansang Manok 71
San Miguel wins series, 4–3

Smart Araneta Coliseum, Quezon City

== Awards ==
=== Conference ===
The Best Player and Best Import of the Conference awards were handed out prior to Game 4 of the Finals, at the Smart Araneta Coliseum:

- Best Player of the Conference:: June Mar Fajardo (San Miguel Beermen)
- Finals MVP: June Mar Fajardo (San Miguel Beermen)

=== Players of the Week ===
Week	Player	Ref.
January 13–20	Sean Anthony (NorthPort Batang Pier)	
January 21–27	Jayson Castro (TNT KaTropa)	
January 28 – February 3	John Paul Erram (NLEX Road Warriors)	
February 4–13	James Yap (Rain or Shine Elasto Painters)	
February 27 – March 3	Calvin Abueva (Phoenix Pulse Fuel Masters)	
March 4–10	June Mar Fajardo (San Miguel Beermen)	
March 11–17	Bong Galanza (NLEX Road Warriors)	
March 18–24	Ian Sangalang (Magnolia Hotshots Pambansang Manok)	

=== Rookies of the Month ===
Month	Player	Ref.
January	CJ Perez (Columbian Dyip)	
February	Javee Mocon (Rain or Shine Elasto Painters)	

== Statistics ==
=== Individual statistical leaders ===
Category	Player	Team	Statistic
Points per game	June Mar Fajardo	San Miguel Beermen	21.3
Rebounds per game	June Mar Fajardo	San Miguel Beermen	13.9
Assists per game	Chris Ross	San Miguel Beermen	6.2
Steals per game	Sean Anthony	NorthPort Batang Pier	2.7
Blocks per game	John Paul Erram	NLEX Road Warriors	2.7
Turnovers per game	Calvin Abueva	Phoenix Pulse Fuel Masters	4.4
Fouls per game	Sean Anthony	NorthPort Batang Pier	4.0
Minutes per game	Stanley Pringle	NorthPort Batang Pier	38.5
FG%	Bradwyn Guinto	NorthPort Batang Pier	67.6%
FT%	Matthew Wright	Phoenix Pulse Fuel Masters	92.4%
3FG%	Glenn Khobuntin	Columbian Dyip	55.0%
Double-doubles	June Mar Fajardo	San Miguel Beermen	20

=== Individual game highs ===
Category	Player	Team	Statistic
Points	June Mar Fajardo	San Miguel Beermen	40
Rebounds	June Mar Fajardo	San Miguel Beermen	31
Assists	Chris Banchero	Alaska Aces	16
Steals	Sean Anthony	NorthPort Batang Pier	7
Blocks	John Paul Erram (thrice)	NLEX Road Warriors	5
Blocks	Raymond Almazan	Rain or Shine Elasto Painters	5
Three point field goals	Marcio Lassiter (twice)	San Miguel Beermen	7
Three point field goals	Roger Pogoy	TNT KaTropa	7
Three point field goals	Stanley Pringle (twice)	NorthPort Batang Pier	7
Three point field goals	Michael DiGregorio	Blackwater Elite	7
Three point field goals	Arwind Santos	San Miguel Beermen	7

=== Team statistical leaders ===
Category	Team	Statistic
Points per game	NorthPort Batang Pier	101.3
Rebounds per game	Phoenix Pulse Fuel Masters	55.0
Assists per game	NLEX Road Warriors	24.7
Steals per game	TNT KaTropa	11.0
Blocks per game	NLEX Road Warriors	5.9
Turnovers per game	NLEX Road Warriors	19.6
FG%	NorthPort Batang Pier	44.8%
FT%	Meralco Bolts	73.9%
3FG%	NLEX Road Warriors	33.9%
