= Chris Timberlake =

Filipino-American basketball player

Personal information
- Born: April 28, 1985 (age 41) Washington, D.C., U.S.
- Listed height: 5 ft 10 in (1.78 m)
- Listed weight: 182 lb (83 kg)

Career information
- High school: Dr. Michael M. Krop (Miami, Florida)
- College: North Florida (2004–2008)
- PBA draft: 2009: 1st round, 7th overall pick
- Drafted by: Barangay Ginebra Kings
- Playing career: 2009–2015
- Position: Point guard

Career history
- 2009–2011: Purefoods Tender Juicy Giants / B-Meg Derby Ace Llamados
- 2011–2013: Meralco Bolts
- 2013–2014: GlobalPort Batang Pier
- 2014: Meralco Bolts
- 2014–2015: Blackwater Elite

Career highlights
- PBA champion (2009–10 Philippine); PBL champion (2009 PG Flex Unity); PBL Finals MVP (2009 PG Flex Unity)

Chris Timberlake (born April 28, 1985) is a Filipino-American former basketball player who last played for the Blackwater Elite of the Philippine Basketball Association (PBA). Before joining the PBA, he played for the North Florida Ospreys and won a title in the Philippine Basketball League. He was selected 7th overall in the 2009 PBA draft by the Barangay Ginebra Kings and was then traded to the Purefoods Tender Juicy Giants. He then went to play six seasons in the PBA, winning one title.

== Amateur career ==
Timberlake played for the North Florida Ospreys in college, graduating in 2008. He then moved to the Philippines and played for Oracle Residences in the 2009 PBL Flex Unity Cup. He won a PBL championship with them during that conference, and also won finals MVP.

== Professional career ==
=== Purefoods Tender Juicy Giants / B-Meg Derby Ace Llamados (2009–2011) ===
Timberlake was selected 7th overall in the 2009 PBA draft by the Barangay Ginebra Kings. A day later, he was traded to the Purefoods Tender Juicy Giants in a trade that involved nine players, three teams, and four draft picks. He signed a three-year contract with the team. He won a championship with Purefoods in his first conference, the 2009–10 Philippine Cup. He got to play in the Rookies v. Sophomores Blitz Game during the 2010 All-Star Weekend.

=== Meralco Bolts (2011–2013) ===
In 2011, Timberlake was picked up as a free agent by the Meralco Bolts. Three days after he was signed, he suffered a calf strain. During the 2013 Commissioner's Cup, he stepped up when Chris Ross went down with a foot injury, scoring 10 points, five rebounds and four assists in a win over the GlobalPort Batang Pier.

=== GlobalPort Batang Pier (2013–2014) ===
On October 11, 2013, Timberlake and Ross were traded to GlobalPort for Gary David and A. J. Mandani.

=== Return to Meralco (2014) ===
Timberlake played seven games for Meralco in the 2013–14 Philippine Cup but was scoreless in those games. In the 2014 Commissioner's Cup, he had a career-high 12 points in a win over the Barako Bull Energy Cola that secured Meralco a slot in the quarterfinals. At the end of the 2013–2014 season, Timberlake became an "unprotected" player and Meralco decided to release him to the 2014 Expansion Draft.

=== Blackwater Elite (2014–2015) ===
Timberlake was drafted by the expansion team Blackwater Elite in the expansion draft. Blackwater did not bring him back after the 2014–15 season.

== PBA career statistics ==
Legend
GP	Games played	MPG	Minutes per game
FG%	Field-goal percentage	3P%	3-point field-goal percentage	FT%	Free-throw percentage
RPG	Rebounds per game	APG	Assists per game	SPG	Steals per game
BPG	Blocks per game	PPG	Points per game	**Bold**	Career high

=== Season ===
Year	Team	GP	MPG	FG%	3P%	FT%	RPG	APG	SPG	BPG	PPG
2009–10	Purefoods/B-Meg Derby Ace	30	8.6	.338	.182	.588	.8	.9	.3	.0	2.0
2010–11	B-Meg Derby Ace	9	7.9	.200	.000	.250	.8	.3	.4	.0	1.0
2011–12	Meralco	24	12.4	.283	.263	.667	.6	1.5	.4	.1	1.9
2012–13	Meralco / GlobalPort	15	14.0	.364	.000	.800	1.6	1.4	.5	.1	2.1
2013–14	GlobalPort / Meralco	16	14.8	.265	.286	1.000	1.2	1.1	.1	.1	1.8
2014–15	Blackwater Elite	22	11.1	.378	.375	1.000	.8	.9	.2	.1	1.9
Career		116	11.4	.316	.268	.700	.9	1.1	.3	.1	1.9
