= Frank Golla =

Filipino basketball player

Personal information
- Born: January 17, 1990 (age 36) Quezon City, Philippines
- Listed height: 6 ft 5 in (1.96 m)
- Listed weight: 240 lb (109 kg)

Career information
- High school: Ateneo (Quezon City)
- College: Ateneo
- PBA draft: 2014: 2nd round, 23rd overall pick
- Drafted by: Blackwater Elite
- Playing career: 2014–2021
- Position: Power forward / center

Career history
- 2014–2016: Blackwater Elite
- 2016–2019: TNT KaTropa
- 2019–2020: Iloilo United Royals
- 2020–2021: Blackwater Elite / Bossing

Career highlights
- 4× UAAP champion (2009–2012)

Frank B. Golla Jr. (born January 17, 1990) is a Filipino former basketball player. He last played for the Blackwater Bossing of the Philippine Basketball Association (PBA). He was drafted 23rd overall by Blackwater in the 2014 PBA draft.

== Career statistics ==
Legend
| GP | Games played | MPG | Minutes per game |
| FG% | Field-goal percentage | 3P% | 3-point field-goal percentage | FT% | Free-throw percentage |
| RPG | Rebounds per game | APG | Assists per game | SPG | Steals per game |
| BPG | Blocks per game | PPG | Points per game | **Bold** | Career high |

=== College ===
| Year | Team | GP | MPG | FG% | 3P% | FT% | RPG | APG | SPG | BPG | PPG |
|---|---|---|---|---|---|---|---|---|---|---|---|
| 2009-10 | Ateneo | 11 | 2.7 | — | — | .750 | .9 | — | — | — | .3 |
| 2010-11 | Ateneo | 17 | 18.1 | **.449** | — | .625 | **5.5** | .4 | .2 | .4 | 3.5 |
| 2011-12 | Ateneo | 12 | 12.8 | .267 | — | **1.000** | 3.5 | **.8** | .1 | .3 | 1.0 |
| 2012-13 | Ateneo | 13 | 6.8 | .400 | — | **1.000** | 1.8 | .1 | .1 | **.5** | .8 |
| 2013-14 | Ateneo | 14 | **23.2** | .426 | — | .556 | 2.9 | .4 | **.3** | .1 | **4.5** |
| Career | | 67 | 13.5 | .413 | — | .689 | 3.1 | .3 | .1 | .3 | 2.2 |

=== PBA season-by-season averages ===
| Year | Team | GP | MPG | FG% | 3P% | FT% | RPG | APG | SPG | BPG | PPG |
|---|---|---|---|---|---|---|---|---|---|---|---|
| 2014–15 | Blackwater | 7 | 6.4 | .125 | — | .750 | 1.4 | .0 | .0 | .1 | 1.1 |
| 2015–16 | Blackwater | 22 | 10.5 | **.465** | — | .500 | 2.5 | .3 | .2 | .3 | 1.9 |
| 2016–17 | TNT | **24** | 3.5 | .111 | .200 | **1.000** | .8 | .0 | .0 | .1 | .5 |
| 2017–18 | TNT | 21 | 6.4 | .269 | .200 | .500 | 1.5 | .4 | .1 | .0 | .9 |
| 2019 | TNT | 13 | 3.6 | .222 | .200 | .000 | .5 | .2 | .1 | .2 | .4 |
| 2020 | Blackwater | 11 | **20.8** | .278 | .231 | .750 | **3.3** | **1.1** | .5 | **.5** | 4.4 |
| 2021 | Blackwater | 7 | 15.5 | .367 | **.381** | .800 | **3.3** | .9 | **.6** | .4 | **5.4** |
| Career | | 105 | 8.3 | .309 | .256 | .738 | 1.7 | .3 | .2 | .2 | 1.6 |
