= Alex Nuyles =

Filipino basketball player

Personal information
- Born: July 25, 1989 (age 37) Camalig, Albay, Philippines
- Listed height: 6 ft 2 in (1.88 m)
- Listed weight: 180 lb (82 kg)

Career information
- College: Adamson
- PBA draft: 2013: 1st round, 9th overall pick
- Drafted by: Rain or Shine Elasto Painters
- Playing career: 2013–2019
- Position: Small forward / shooting guard

Career history
- 2013–2014: Rain or Shine Elasto Painters
- 2014–2015: Blackwater Elite
- 2015: Kia Carnival / Mahindra Enforcer
- 2016–2018: Tropang TNT / TNT KaTropa
- 2019: Bicol Volcanoes

Career highlights
- UAAP Season 74 Mythical Five (2011); PCCL Mythical Five (2010)

Alexander Nuyles (born July 25, 1989) is a Filipino former professional basketball player who last played for the Bicol Volcanoes of the Maharlika Pilipinas Basketball League (MPBL). He was drafted 9th overall by the Rain or Shine Elasto Painters in the 2013 PBA draft. He was left unprotected by Rain or Shine Elasto Painters in the 2014 PBA Expansion Draft. He was then selected by the Blackwater Elite with their third pick in the expansion draft. In March 2015, Nuyles was traded to Kia (now Mahindra) for Reil Cervantes.

== UAAP career statistics ==
UAAP career statistics
| Season | Team | GP | GS | MP | PTS | FGM | FGA | FG% | 3PM | 3PA | 3P% | FTM | FTA | FT% | OREB | DREB | TREB | AST | STL | BLK | TOV | PF |
| S74 (2011) | ADU | 14 | 13 | 403 | 213 | 71 | 187 | 38 | 16 | 49 | 32.7 | 55 | 80 | 68.8 | 25 | 52 | 77 | 46 | 12 | 2 | 24 | 14 |
| S75 (2012) | ADU | 4 | 4 | 95 | 25 | 10 | 28 | 35.7 | 2 | 9 | 22.2 | 3 | 7 | 42.9 | 4 | 11 | 15 | 15 | 1 | 0 | 13 | 1 |

== PBA career statistics ==
Legend
| GP | Games played | MPG | Minutes per game |
| FG% | Field-goal percentage | 3P% | 3-point field-goal percentage | FT% | Free-throw percentage |
| RPG | Rebounds per game | APG | Assists per game | SPG | Steals per game |
| BPG | Blocks per game | PPG | Points per game | **Bold** | Career high |

Correct as of July 18, 2015

Season-by-season averages

| Year | Team | GP | MPG | FG% | 3P% | FT% | RPG | APG | SPG | BPG | PPG |
|---|---|---|---|---|---|---|---|---|---|---|---|
| 2013–14 | Rain or Shine | **48** | 10.6 | **.399** | .091 | **.571** | 1.5 | .7 | .3 | **.1** | 3.5 |
| 2014–15 | Blackwater / Kia | 25 | **16.3** | .322 | **.125** | .491 | **1.8** | **1.0** | **.4** | **.1** | **5.8** |
| Career | | 73 | 12.6 | .358 | .105 | .535 | 1.6 | .8 | .3 | .1 | 4.3 |
