= Poy Erram =

Filipino basketball player (born 1989)

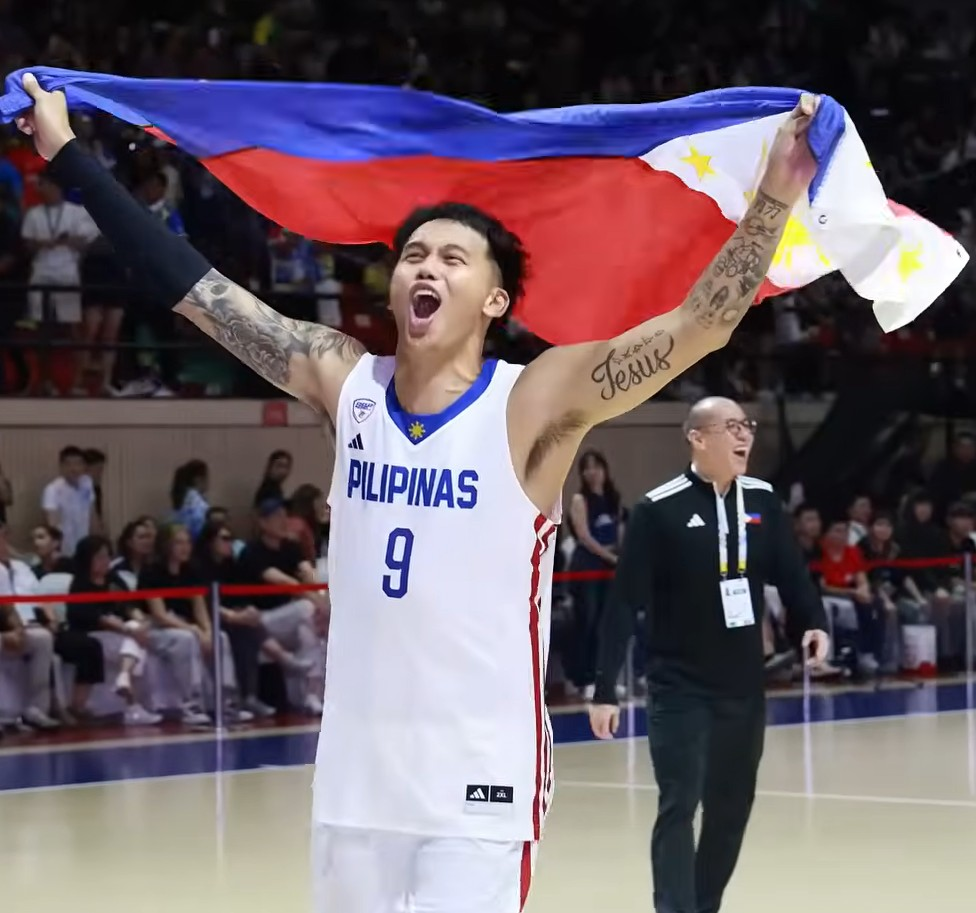
- Erram in 2025

No. 7 – TNT Tropang 5G
- Position: Center
- League: PBA

Personal information
- Born: July 7, 1989 (age 37) Makati, Philippines
- Listed height: 6 ft 8 in (2.03 m)
- Listed weight: 237 lb (108 kg)

Career information
- High school: Pilgrim Christian College (Cagayan de Oro)
- College: Ateneo de Cagayan; Ateneo
- PBA draft: 2013: 2nd round, 15th overall pick
- Drafted by: Talk 'N Text Tropang Texters
- Playing career: 2014–present

Career history
- 2014–2018: Blackwater Elite
- 2019: NLEX Road Warriors
- 2020–present: TNT Tropang Giga/5G

Career highlights
- 4× PBA champion (2021 Philippine, 2023 Governors', 2024 Governors', 2024–25 Commissioner's); 2× PBA All-Star (2018, 2019); PBA Mythical First Team (2020); PBA Mythical Second Team (2018); PBA Defensive Player of the Year (2018); 3× UAAP champion (2010–2012)

John Paul "Poy" I. Erram (born July 7, 1989) is a Filipino professional basketball player for the TNT Tropang 5G of the Philippine Basketball Association (PBA). He was drafted 15th overall in 2013 by the Talk 'N Text Tropang Texters.

He started his career in Ateneo de Manila University (ADMU) where he played for the university's basketball team, the Ateneo Blue Eagles.

== Early life ==
Erram was born in Makati. His father is a soldier while he never saw his biological mother after he turned two years old. He came from a broken family with 11 siblings, but they had different mothers. When he was 12 years old, his father moved him and his siblings to Villanueva, Misamis Oriental, as he was assigned there. It was there that he learned basketball from playing with his friends on the streets. His parents weren't supportive of him playing so often.

Before high school, Erram joined a Milo Olympics tournament in his province, where he met coach Arvin Martinez. Martinez taught him the basics and took care of him. He then brought him to play for Pilgrim Christian. There, he got a scholarship with a free dorm.

== College career ==
=== Xavier Ateneo Crusaders ===
After high school, Erram first played for Ateneo de Cagayan, where he was still coached by Martinez. He ended up staying there for a year.

=== ADMU Blue Eagles ===
Erram then tried out for the Ateneo Blue Eagles. He made the team and moved to Katipunan.

In his rookie season, he had five blocks in a win over the FEU Tamaraws. In Season 75, Erram got suspended for getting his second unsportsmanlike foul. Against the Adamson Soaring Falcons, he injured his ACL and couldn't finish the season. Still, Ateneo won its fifth straight as Justin Chua stepped up in his place.

Erram returned to Ateneo for his final season. Throughout Season 76, he dealt with a MCL injury that had happened in the preseason. Ateneo's title dominance ended when they lost to the UST Growling Tigers and failed to make the Final Four.

== Professional career ==
=== 2013–14 season ===
Erram was drafted by the Talk 'N Text Tropang Texters in the 2013 PBA Draft. It caught him off guard, as he expected to fall to the third round due to his knee injury. He was among six Ateneo players taken in that draft, along with Chua, Greg Slaughter, Ryan Buenafe, Nico Salva, and Chris Sumalinog.

Erram was given a practice player contract. As he wasn't part of the main lineup, he used this time to finish his studies. After the season, Talk 'N Text left him unprotected for the 2014 expansion draft.

=== Blackwater Elite (2014–18) ===
Erram was selected 11th overall during the expansion draft. The coaching staff, led by Leo Isaac and Bong Ramos, helped him to develop his offensive skills. In his PBA debut, he scored 10 points in a loss to the KIA Sorento. He scored a season-high 21 points to go along with his eight rebounds and four blocks in a win over the Meralco Bolts.

In a 2015–16 Philippine Cup game versus the San Miguel Beermen, Erram scored 23 points, his career-high at the time. Against the GlobalPort Batang Pier, he scored nine points, 14 rebounds, and seven blocks, but they still lost. They got to their first quarterfinals in that conference. In a Commissioner's Cup loss to the Rain or Shine Elasto Painters, he scored 20 points. In a close game against the Phoenix Fuel Masters, with seven seconds remaining and Blackwater down by three, he made a crucial rebound and found Carlo Lastimosa, who made the game-tying triple. Although they lost in overtime and failed to make the playoffs, he finished that game with 18 points and 13 rebounds. In a Governors' Cup game against Talk 'N Text, he went down with another ACL injury. He finished his sophomore season with 10.2 points, 6.8 rebounds and nearly two blocks a game. Despite the injury, he signed a two-year contract to stay with Blackwater.

Nine months later, on May 31, 2017, during the 2017 Commissioner's Cup, Erram made his return to the court, playing six minutes. In the Governors' Cup, he had 11 points, 15 rebounds, and seven blocks in a loss to the Star Hotshots. He averaged 10.8 points, 9.3 rebounds and 2.3 blocks in the elimination round. Blackwater made its second playoff appearance in that conference.

In a 2017–18 Philippine Cup win over Barangay Ginebra, Erram scored 21 points, 11 rebounds, and four blocks. He followed that up with 20 points and four steals against TNT, but this time they lost. On January 19, 2018, against GlobalPort, he recorded a career-high 7 blocks in a 101–76 losing effort. Eight days later, Erram scored 14 points and grabbed a career-high 21 rebounds in a 84–88 loss to the Alaska Aces. For the conference, he averaged 14.2 points, a league-leading 13.8 rebounds, and 2.9 blocks per game. He finished fifth in the voting for the Best Player of the Conference award. That season, he was an All-Star, and also got to compete in the Obstacle Challenge during All-Star Week.

In the Commissioner's Cup, Erram averaged 10.6 points, 8.2 rebounds, and 1.7 assists in 29.6 minutes per game. After his stint with the national team after the Commissioner's Cup, Blackwater gave him a three-year max deal worth P15 million. In the Governors' Cup, Blackwater had its best start at 4–0. Their streak was snapped when he missed a game due to the flu and they lost to the NLEX Road Warriors. They went on to make the playoffs, where they were eliminated by the Hotshots. He was named by the PBA Press Corps as the Defensive Player of the Year for the 2017–18 season after averaging a league-leading 1.9 blocks. He also made the Mythical Second Team. Aside from leading the league in blocks, he also had career-high averages of 12.4 points and 10.9 rebounds.

=== NLEX Road Warriors (2019) ===
Days after the 2018 draft, Erram was traded to the NLEX Road Warriors in a three-team trade for Michael Miranda, Abu Tratter, and Paul Desiderio.

In his NLEX debut during the 2019 Philippine Cup, Erram had 10 points, five rebounds, and two blocks in a loss to Rain or Shine. Against TNT, he had five blocks. He had five blocks again against the Columbian Dyip, but this time also scored 23 points, 10 rebounds, and six assists to lead NLEX to its first win of the season. He then made a game-winning block on Meralco's Ranidel de Ocampo. For his performances, he was given a Player of the Week award. He also got selected to the PBA South All-Star team. In his first game against his former team Blackwater, he had a double-double of 20 points and 10 rebounds as he led NLEX to the win. NLEX however, failed to make the playoffs for that conference.

In the first seven games of the Commissioner's Cup, Erram struggled with off-court issues and NLEX only won once. He started to bounce back in a loss to Barangay Ginebra in which he had 20 points and 14 rebounds. Against Rain or Shine, he contributed 13 points, seven rebounds, and made the game-winning block on Denzel Bowles.

Erram missed two weeks of the Governors' Cup due to an elbow injury. Despite the injury, NLEX was the first seed in the playoffs against NorthPort. In a Game 1 loss, he got ejected after a confrontation with NorthPort's import Michael Qualls. That would be the last game he played for NLEX, as he was suspended one game for his actions and could only watch as NLEX was eliminated. For the 2019 season, he averaged 11.7 points, 7.8 rebounds, and 2.1 blocks.

=== TNT Tropang Giga / TNT Tropang 5G (2020–present) ===
On February 29, 2020, Erram was officially traded to the TNT Tropang Giga via a three-team trade. This marked his return to the TNT franchise since they drafted him back in 2013. Due to the COVID-19 pandemic, his debut was delayed.

==== 2021: First PBA championship ====
Erram made his TNT debut months later against Alaska with four points, eight rebounds, and six assists. Although he got ejected in the third quarter, TNT was still able to pull off the win due to RR Pogoy's 45 points and Jayson Castro's 28 points. As his ejection happened on opening day, he got to pay a lower fine. In a win over San Miguel, he scored a career-high 27 points and also grabbed 15 rebounds. TNT started out 5–0, with their winning streak snapped by NLEX. From there, TNT made it to the finals, making this his first-ever finals appearance. In the finals, they lost to Ginebra. He was named as a member of the PBA's Elite Five, with averages of 11.8 points, 9.7 rebounds, and 1.1 blocks in 22 games.

In the 2021 Philippine Cup, Erram helped TNT claim first seed with 17 points and eight rebounds in a win over Alaska. In Game 1 of the semifinals against San Miguel, he scored 15 points and five rebounds as they took the win. During Game 4, he got accidentally hit in the head, and had to go to the hospital. TNT lost, and it was suspected that he fractured his cheekbone. Still, he was able to play the following game. TNT made it to the finals against the Hotshots where in Game 1, he only scored six points, but led the team with 12 rebounds and four blocks off the bench. TNT went on to win the finals in six games. With the win, he won his first PBA title.

In a 2021 Governors' Cup win over Rain or Shine, Erram had 15 points and nine rebounds, and also made two game-clinching free throws. In the second quarter of their game against the Hotshots, he injured his lower back. After sitting out a game, he made his return in a win over San Miguel. For that conference, TNT made it as far as the quarterfinals, where they lost to Ginebra.

==== 2022–23: Second PBA championship ====
Erram added 13 points and eight rebounds in a 2022 Philippine Cup win over Meralco. In an overtime win over Rain or Shine, he scored six of his 13 points in the extra period, including a two-point basket that eventually gave TNT the lead. They got their sixth win of the conference against the Batang Pier in which he had a double-double of 17 points and 14 rebounds. He then followed it up with nearly a double-double with 18 points and nine rebounds. TNT made it to the semifinals against the Hotshots. TNT won the first game, but lost Game 2 despite his 13 points. He then led the team with 22 points and eight rebounds the following game, and TNT took a 2–1 lead. He got his first double-double of the series in Game 4 with 19 points and 13 rebounds. The Hotshots fought back in Game 5 to bring the series to 3–2 despite his 16 points and nine rebounds. In Game 6, he was ejected from the game when he accidentally elbowed Ian Sangalang in the head during the fourth quarter. Despite not having him to finish the game, TNT was still able to win to book a return to the finals. In that semifinals series he averaged 14 points and 8.7 rebounds for TNT.

In the finals against SMB, TNT went down 2–1. They battled back and took a 3–2 series lead with a Game 5 win. In that pivotal Game 5, he had 17 points, seven rebounds, and a game-high three blocks. He was able to perform well in that game despite suffering an ankle sprain in practice. In Game 7, he got ejected in the second quarter after elbowing San Miguel's Mo Tautuaa in the head. Without him, and the team playing through multiple injuries, TNT lost the Philippine Cup title to San Miguel.

Erram then missed the Governors' Cup elimination round of TNT due to a knee procedure. He made his return in the quarterfinals against Phoenix. TNT made it back to the finals against Ginebra where in Game 1, he fouled out. With TNT already having a depleted frontcourt without Kelly Williams and Justin Chua, Ginebra took the first win. After the game, head coach Jojo Lastimosa and his teammates implored him to control his emotions better. He got five fouls the following game, but TNT won. In Game 3, he had his best game of the finals yet with 14 points, nine rebounds, and three rebounds. After the game, he informed officials that a fan had been heckling him with disrespectful insults about his mother, who had been going through a stroke. With Erram calling for better protection from the PBA, the league responded by adding more personnel in the venue to better police fan behavior. The team also rallied behind him by comforting him and supporting him on social media. He was able to focus on playing in Game 4 and contributed eight rebounds in the win. With Williams returning, and his renewed focus, TNT was able to win the finals in six games.

==== 2023–24 season: Season absence ====
In the offseason, Erram trained with Gilas Pilipinas. However, he pulled out due to bone spurs. With him undergoing surgery, he was expected to be out for the entire season.

== National team career ==
In 2016, he was invited to be part of the Philippine men's national team for the FIBA Asia Challenge Cup. Due to his knee injury, he couldn't play.

In 2018, Coach Yeng Guiao picked Erram to play in the Asian Games. He then got to play for Coach Guiao again during the 2019 FIBA World Cup qualifiers. He had a chance to play in the World Cup, but sprained his ankle in practice. As a result, he was one of the final cuts on the team.

After the World Cup, Erram got to play for the national team once again in 2020 against Indonesia during the FIBA Asia Cup qualifiers. Two years later, he got to play in the second window of the FIBA Asia Cup qualifiers and the FIBA Asia Cup itself.

Erram was included in the 21-man pool of the Philippines for the 2023 FIBA World Cup. He was eventually ruled out due to injury. He subsequently announced his retirement from the national team on August 13, 2023.

Erram was invited by coach Norman Black for a one-off stint with the national team for the 2025 SEA Games in Thailand. At first, the SEA Games organizers did not approve of his inclusion to the roster for unknown reasons. He was then allowed to join the roster as an injury replacement for Allen Liwag. The Philippines went on to win the gold medal by defeating Thailand in the finals, and he won his first gold medal with the national team.

== PBA career statistics ==
Legend
GP	Games played	MPG	Minutes per game	FG%	Field-goal percentage
3FG%	3-point field-goal percentage	4P%	4-point field-goal percentage	FT%	Free-throw percentage
RPG	Rebounds per game	APG	Assists per game	SPG	Steals per game
BPG	Blocks per game	PPG	Points per game	127	Career high

As of the end of 2024–25 season

=== Season-by-season averages ===
Year	Team	GP	MPG	FG%	3P%	4P%	FT%	RPG	APG	SPG	BPG	PPG
2014–15	Blackwater	32	13.3	.538	.000	—	.606	3.5	.6	.3	.8	4.6
2015–16	Blackwater	27	25.5	.538	.000	—	.745	6.8	1.0	.7	1.9	10.2
2016–17	Blackwater	14	26.7	.538	.250	—	.680	8.1	.5	.9	2.0	10.3
2017–18	Blackwater	30	31.2	.464	.152	—	.586	10.9	1.7	.8	2.0	12.4
2019	NLEX	33	25.8	.474	.302	—	.623	8.2	1.8	.5	2.1	11.7
2020	TNT	22	27.7	.513	.239	—	.610	9.7	1.6	.8	1.1	11.8
2021	TNT	36	20.1	.470	.286	—	.708	6.4	.9	.3	1.2	8.4
2022–23	TNT	46	22.0	.480	.200	—	.598	7.3	1.4	.6	1.2	9.2
2024–25	TNT	71	19.0	.542	.291	.000	.730	4.9	.8	.4	1.1	7.8
Career		311	22.4	.501	.254	.000	.651	6.9	1.1	.5	1.4	9.2

== Personal life ==
Erram is married to former Taal Vista Hotel events manager Jerrylee Rabano. They had a civil marriage officiated by Makati mayor Abby Binay in 2019, followed by a church ceremony in 2022. They have three children together, with one born out of wedlock.
