= Riego Gamalinda =

Filipino basketball player

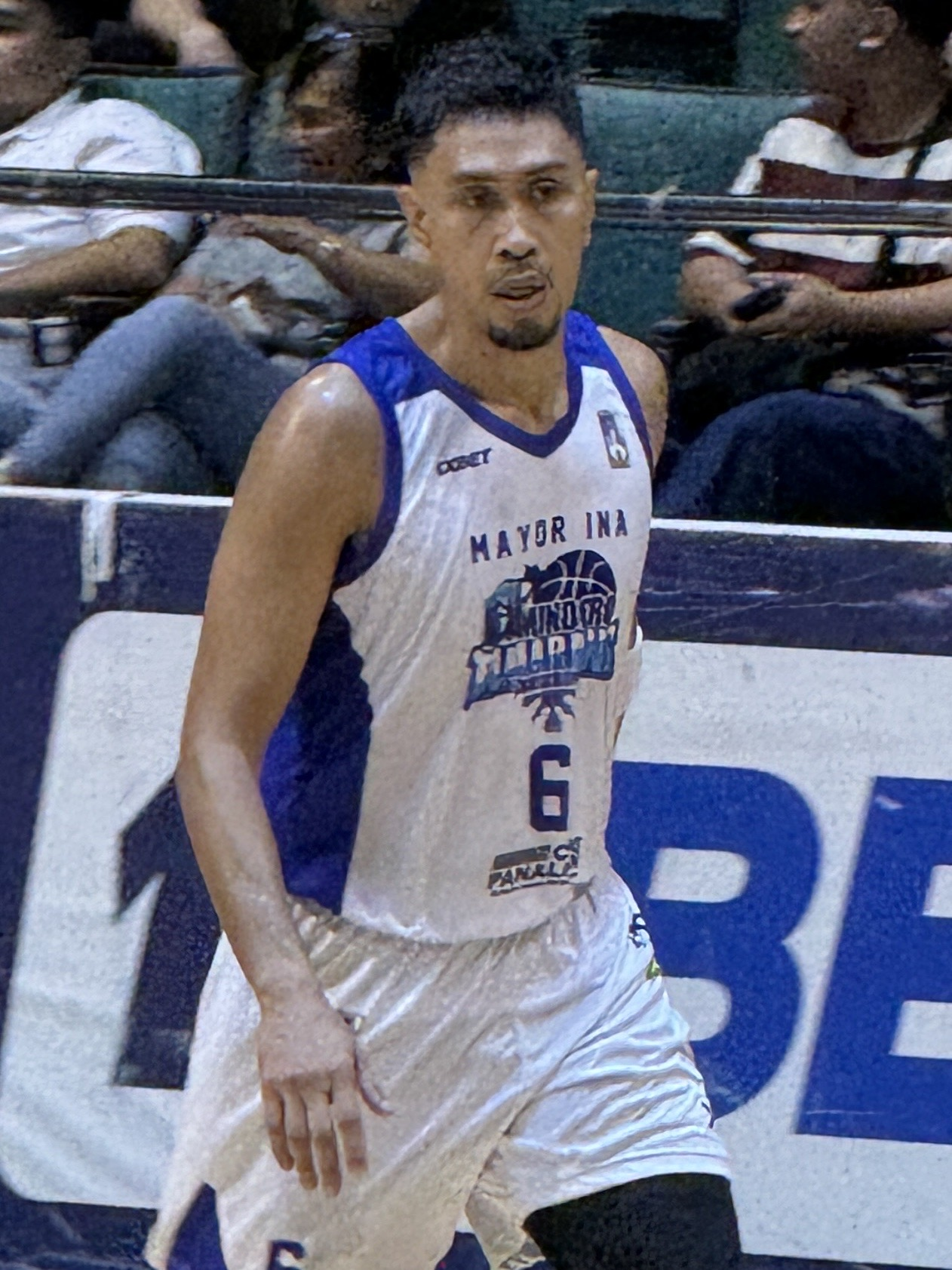
- Gamalinda with the Mindoro Tamaraws in 2025

No. 6 – Mindoro Tamaraws
- Position: Small forward
- League: MPBL

Personal information
- Born: May 25, 1986 (age 40) Iligan, Philippines
- Listed height: 6 ft 3 in (1.91 m)
- Listed weight: 184 lb (83 kg)

Career information
- High school: Iligan City National (Iligan)
- College: San Beda
- PBA draft: 2010: 2nd round, 11th overall pick
- Drafted by: Meralco Bolts
- Playing career: 2010–present

Career history
- 2010–2011: Meralco Bolts
- 2011–2013: Talk 'N Text Tropang Texters
- 2014–2017: Blackwater Elite
- 2017–2019: Star / Magnolia Hotshots
- 2020–2021: San Miguel Beermen
- 2023–2024: Davao Occidental Tigers
- 2024: Rizal Golden Coolers
- 2025–present: Mindoro Tamaraws

Career highlights
- 3× PBA champion (2011–12 Philippine, 2012–13 Philippine, 2018 Governors'); MPBL All-Star (2026); 3× NCAA Philippines champion (2006–2008)

Riego Meinardo "Bambam" Villa Gamalinda (born May 25, 1986) is a Filipino professional basketball player for the Mindoro Tamaraws of the Maharlika Pilipinas Basketball League (MPBL). He was drafted 11th overall in 2010 by the Bolts. He was one of the key players of the San Beda Red Lions during its three peat run from 2006 to 2008.

== Professional career ==
In the 2010 PBA draft, he was drafted 11th overall by the Bolts. He played primarily as a backup guard/forward to Mark Cardona and had limited minutes.

At the off-season, he and Shawn Weinstein were traded to the Talk 'N Text Tropang Texters. He was traded along with Rabeh Al-Hussaini and Pamboy Raymundo in a three-way trade involving Air21 Express and Meralco Bolts. He was waived after.

After being waived by TNT, he was picked up by Blackwater Elite in the 2014 PBA Expansion Draft. He had his best year of his career so far, posting career highs in minutes (24 MPG), points (8.2 PPG) and rebounds (4.1 RPG) while playing 33 games during the 2014–15 season. In the following season (2015–16), he had his most efficient year shooting the ball, with career-highs in percentages in both FGs (.433) and 3-point FGs (.319) while playing for 34 games.

On September 10, 2017, Gamalinda, along with Kyle Pascual, was traded to the Star Hotshots for Allein Maliksi and Chris Javier.

On February 7, 2020, Gamalinda signed with the San Miguel Beermen.

== PBA career statistics ==
Legend
GP	Games played	MPG	Minutes per game
FG%	Field-goal percentage	3P%	3-point field-goal percentage	FT%	Free-throw percentage
RPG	Rebounds per game	APG	Assists per game	SPG	Steals per game
BPG	Blocks per game	PPG	Points per game	**Bold**	Career high

As of the end of 2021 season

=== Season-by-season averages ===
Year	Team	GP	MPG	FG%	3P%	FT%	RPG	APG	SPG	BPG	PPG
2010–11	Meralco	17	10.0	.340	.000	.600	1.5	.7	.1	.1	2.5
2011–12	Talk 'N Text	**41**	8.4	.383	.250	.550	.9	.4	.0	.1	2.2
2012–13	Talk 'N Text	24	5.2	.382	.250	.000	.5	.3	.0	.1	1.2
2014–15	Blackwater	33	**24.0**	.376	.293	**.744**	**4.1**	**1.3**	.3	.2	**8.2**
2015–16	Blackwater	34	19.1	.433	.319	.712	2.9	.8	**.4**	**.3**	7.0
2016–17	Blackwater	32	14.2	.435	.393	.655	2.3	.7	.3	.1	3.9
2016–17	Star	32	14.2	.435	.393	.655	2.3	.7	.3	.1	3.9
2017–18	Magnolia	24	7.5	.459	.200	.611	1.3	.3	.2	.0	2.9
2019	Magnolia	11	5.0	**.556**	.000	.000	.4	.5	.1	.1	1.8
2020	San Miguel	13	13.0	.409	**.667**	.579	3.0	.4	**.4**	.2	3.8
2021	San Miguel	16	5.8	.208	—	.667	1.0	.3	.1	.1	.8
Career		245	12.4	.401	.295	.652	2.0	.6	.2	.1	3.8
