= Blackwater Bossing =

Philippine professional basketball team

- 2025–26 Blackwater Bossing season
- Founded: 2014
- History: Blackwater Elite (2014–2021); Blackwater Bossing (2021–present)
- Team colors: Red, black, white
- Company: Ever Bilena
- Board governor: Silliman Sy
- Team manager: Johnson Martinez; Rhona Tibor (assistant)
- Head coach: Patrick Aquino (interim)
- Team captain: Sedrick Barefield
- Ownership: Dioceldo S. Sy
- Retired numbers: 1 (11)
Light uniform	Dark uniform

The Blackwater Bossing is a professional basketball team owned by Ever Bilena, Inc. that is playing in the Philippine Basketball Association (PBA) beginning in the 2014–2015 season. The franchise started as one of the founding teams in the PBA Developmental League. It transferred to the PBA after being accepted as an expansion team. The team is named after Ever Bilena's brand of men's fragrances.

== History ==
=== PBA D-League ===
Blackwater was one of the founding teams in the PBA Developmental League (PBA D-League). It won one PBA D-League championship. The team's predecessor was the Blu Detergent team in the Philippine Basketball League (PBL), best known as the first Philippine basketball team of Asi Taulava.

=== Establishment ===
On April 10, 2014, Ever Bilena Cosmetics was granted an expansion team by the PBA Board of Governors. Ever Bilena's team would begin competing in the 2014–15 PBA season alongside Manila North Tollways Corporation's NLEX Road Warriors and Columbian Autocar Corporation's Kia Sorento However, Ever Bilena as well as MNTC weren't allowed to carry-over their existing PBA D-League teams due to Columbian not having an existing team in the minor league. This meant that all three expansion teams would have to build their rosters from the ground up via the expansion draft, rookie draft, and free agency.

With MNTC opting to acquire the Air21 Express to establish their new NLEX team, this meant that Blackwater and Kia would be the two teams who would participate in the 2014 PBA expansion draft. Among Blackwater's notable acquisitions include Eddie Laure, Paul Artadi, Bryan Faundo, and Riego Gamalinda. The team also selected veteran players Danny Ildefonso and Norman Gonzales, but both players ended up not playing for them. In the rookie draft, Blackwater used their first-round pick to select Juami Tiongson. During the preseason, the team also made a couple of trades which brought in Sunday Salvacion, Jason Ballesteros, and Larry Rodriguez.

=== 2014–2020: The Blackwater Elite era ===
The team's first conference in the PBA was dismal, not winning a single game during the 2014–15 PBA Philippine Cup. During the season, the team tried to bolster their roster with the acquisitions of Reil Cervantes from the Kia Carnival and Carlo Lastimosa from the Barako Bull Energy, but traded away Alex Nyules and Brian Heruela to do so, and reinforcing with Gilas Pilipinas player Marcus Douthit during the import-laden conferences, but it wasn't enough. Although Blackwater finally got their first win in the 2015 PBA Commissioner's Cup against the San Miguel Beermen, the team finished 12th in the two remaining conferences.

It would have meant that Blackwater would be guaranteed the first pick of the 2015 PBA draft with the draft lottery abolished, but due to the Larry Rodriguez trade, they ended up swapping picks with the Talk 'N Text Tropang Texters. Instead, Blackwater had the ninth pick, who they used to select Arthur dela Cruz. They then added Almond Vosotros with the 13th pick. In the preseason, the team acquired former Alaska Aces star Mike Cortez from the Meralco Bolts as part of a larger three-team trade. In the 2015–16 PBA Philippine Cup, the Elite were finally able to escape out of the bottom spot, securing a 10th-place finish with a 3–8 record. Due to the conference's format at the time, it was enough to send Blackwater to their first-ever playoff appearance. The team lost to the Rain or Shine Elasto Painters, who had twice-to-beat advantage, in one game. However, the team wasn't able to go back to the playoffs, but did secure a young player in that of Roi Sumang from the GlobalPort Batang Pier as part of a greater six-team trade.

In the 2016 PBA draft. Blackwater selected Mac Belo during the special round of the draft and used their first overall pick of the regular draft to select Raphael Banal. In the 2016–17 PBA Philippine Cup, the team had their best record in the elimination round yet, a 5–6 record with a 9th-place finish. Tied with Rain or Shine for 8th place, both teams contested in a one-game playoff during which the Elite fell to the Elasto Painters. Ahead of the 2017 Commissioner's Cup, Blackwater signed free agent Michael DiGregorio, and during the conference acquired KG Canaleta in a trade with GlobalPort. However, the team still fell to 11th. During the following Governors' Cup, the team traded with the Star Hotshots, sending Bambam Gamalinda and Kyle Pascual to Star while bringing in Allein Maliksi and Chris Javier. With the help of their import in Henry Walker, who replaced Trevis Simpson after an 0–3 start, the team finished 8th in the conference. Despite getting a game off of advantage holders Meralco Bolts, the team couldn't close the series in the second game and were eliminated.

Blackwater had the third pick of the 2017 PBA draft, which they used to select Raymar Jose. The Elite also brought back Mike Cortez, who was a free agent. In the first two conferences of the season, the team failed to make the playoffs. On the plus side, Blackwater was able to take their talents internationally. On July 12, 2018, Blackwater Elite completed a six-game sweep of the Pacific Caesar 50th Anniversary Pro Tournament in Surabaya, Indonesia. The following week, Blackwater and the NLEX Road Warriors represented the Philippines in the Super 8 tournament hosted by the Asia League (known today as the East Asia Super League) in Macau. With import Henry Walker returning to reinforce the roster in the 2018 PBA Governors' Cup, the Elite had their best conference yet, a 5th-place finish with a 7–4 record. It still meant that they had to win back-to-back games against the Magnolia Hotshots Pambansang Manok in the quarterfinals, in which Magnolia defeated Blackwater in the first game.

Blackwater then had the second pick of the 2018 PBA draft, where they selected former NBA D-League player Bobby Ray Parks Jr. Their preseason transactions saw the team trade away some of their key players, they first traded Paul Zamar to the San Miguel Beermen for a pair of second-round picks in seasons 47 and 48, then sent Poy Erram to NLEX as part of a three-team trade with the TNT KaTropa and got Abu Tratter and Paul Desiderio in return. The team didn't start the season well, finishing in last place in the 2019 Philippine Cup, but in the following Commissioner's Cup, the team went back up to a 7–4 record, and found themselves at third place, their highest placing yet. However, the team lost to Rain or Shine as the best-of-three quarterfinals reached its full length. During the Governors' Cup, the team engaged in multiple trades which saw a major reshuffling of the team. In summation, Tratter, DiGregorio, Parks Jr., Maliksi, and Jose well all sent to other teams. Blackwater acquired Carl Bryan Cruz, Don Trollano, Anthony Semerad, and Mike Tolomia as part of the series of trades as well as the returning Heruela and Canaleta. Blackwater finished in the Governors' Cup in 12th place once more.

The 2019 PBA draft saw Blackwater select Rey Suerte in the special round followed by Maurice Shaw with the second overall pick of the regular draft. The team first traded Brian Heruela to the Phoenix Super LPG Fuel Masters for Ron Dennison. Then, Blackwater made another big transaction, trading away numerous assets. The team sent Poy Erram to the TNT Tropang Giga, and Anthony Semerad, Rabeh Al-Hussaini to the NLEX Road Warriors alongside two future draft picks. Their return package all came from TNT, with Marion Magat, Ed Daquioag, and Yousef Taha joining the Elite, though Taha didn't play for the team for the upcoming season, as well as two of TNT's future draft picks. The team finished 10th place with a 2–9 record in the 2020 PBA Philippine Cup, the lone conference of the 2020 season.

=== 2021–present: The Blackwater Bossing era ===
In August 2020, it was reported that the team would change its name to "Blackwater Bossing". The new branding, including the team's logo and jersey design, was unveiled in September 2020.

== Current roster ==
Blackwater Bossing roster
Players
Coaches

Pos.	#	POB	Name	Height	Weight	DOB (YYYY–MM–DD)	From
G	0	(Philippines)	RK Ilagan	5 ft 7 in (1.70 m)	150 lb (68 kg)	1997–04–03	San Sebastian
F/C	1	(Philippines)	Abu Tratter	6 ft 5 in (1.96 m)	215 lb (98 kg)	1993–01–09	De La Salle
G	2	(United States)	Sedrick Barefield	6 ft 2 in (1.88 m)	190 lb (86 kg)	1996–11–18	Utah
G	3	(United States)	Michael DiGregorio	6 ft 1 in (1.85 m)	180 lb (82 kg)	1991–12–12	McKendree
F	7	(Philippines)	Nick Demusis	6 ft 4 in (1.93 m)	205 lb (93 kg)	1991–05–09	Whittier
G	9	(Italy)	Dalph Panopio	6 ft 1 in (1.85 m)	180 lb (82 kg)	2000–06–10	Cal State Bakersfield
F	10	(United States)	David Murrell	6 ft 4 in (1.93 m)	195 lb (88 kg)	1996–11–08	UP Diliman
G/F	12	(Philippines)	Jack Cruz-Dumont	6 ft 3 in (1.91 m)		2000–10–14	UE
F	14	(Philippines)	Troy Mallillin	6 ft 4 in (1.93 m)	190 lb (86 kg)	1999–01–04	Ateneo
G	15	(Philippines)	Kib Montalbo	6 ft 0 in (1.83 m)	155 lb (70 kg)	1996–04–02	De La Salle
G/F	17	(Philippines)	CJ Austria	6 ft 3 in (1.91 m)		2001–06–16	La Salle
F/C	19	(Philippines)	James Una	6 ft 5 in (1.96 m)		2001–03–19	San Sebastian
F	23	(Philippines)	Richard Escoto	6 ft 3 in (1.91 m)	204 lb (93 kg)	1997–03–21	Far Eastern
F	25	(Canada)	Christian David (injured)	6 ft 6 in (1.98 m)	215 lb (98 kg)	1998–06–19	Butler
G	26	(Philippines)	Jed Mendoza	5 ft 10 in (1.78 m)	160 lb (73 kg)	1996–06–21	UE
F	31	(Philippines)	James Sena	6 ft 5 in (1.96 m)	225 lb (102 kg)	1988–08–31	José Rizal
F/C	–	(Philippines)	Ximone Sandagon (injured)	6 ft 4 in (1.93 m)		1999–03–10	Far Eastern

Head coach

- (Philippines) Patrick Aquino (interim)

Assistant coach(es)

- (Philippines) Joe Silva (1st assistant)
- (Philippines) Junjie Ablan
- (Philippines) Ryan Alba
- (United States) Mike Cortez
- (Philippines) Aries Dimaunahan
- (Philippines) John Ferriols
- (Philippines) Daniel Olan

Team manager

- (Philippines) Johnson Martinez
- (Philippines) Rhona Tibor (assistant)

Legend

- (C) Team captain
- (CI) Commissioner's Cup Import
- (GI) Governors' Cup Import
- (EI) EASL Import
- (DP) Unsigned draft pick
- (FA) Free agent
- (IN) Inactive
- (S) Suspended
- (R) Rookie
- Injured

Roster

== Players ==
- Dylan Ababou
- Val Acuña
- Raymond Aguilar
- Jason Ballesteros
- Raphael Banal
- Mac Belo
- Gilbert Bulawan
- Niño Canaleta
- Jerick Cañada
- JR Cawaling
- Robby Celiz
- Reil Cervantes
- Mike Cortez
- Mark Cruz
- Arthur dela Cruz
- J.P. Erram
- Bryan Faundo
- James Forrester
- Riego Gamalinda
- Frank Golla (2016)
- Brian Heruela
- Carlo Lastimosa
- Eddie Laure
- Dave Marcelo
- Jason Melano
- Denok Miranda
- Alex Nuyles
- Bobby Ray Parks Jr.
- Kyle Pascual
- Tristan Perez
- Raphael Reyes
- Larry Rodriguez
- Sunday Salvacion
- James Sena
- Roi Sumang
- Chris Timberlake
- Juami Tiongson
- Almond Vosotros

=== Imports ===
- (Philippines) (United States) Marcus Douthit (2015 Commissioner's) & (2015 Governors')
- (United States) Marcus Cousin (2015 Governors')
- (United States) M. J. Rhett (2016 Commissioner's)
- (United States) Eric Dawson (2016 Governors')
- (Palestine) Imad Qahwash (2016 Governors')
- (United States) Keala King (2016 Governors')
- (United States) Greg Smith (2017 Commissioner's) & (2019 Commissioner's)
- (United States) Trevis Simpson (2017 Governors')
- (United States) Henry Walker (2017 Governors'), (2018 Commissioner's) & (2018 Governors')
- (United States) Jarrid Famous (2018 Commissioner's)
- (United States) Alex Stepheson (2019 Commissioner's)
- (United States) Staphon Blair (2019 Commissioner's)
- (United States) Marqus Blakely (2019 Governors')
- (United States) Aaron Fuller (2019 Governors')
- (United States) Jaylen Bond (2021 Governors')
- (United States) Shawn Glover 2021 Governors' & (2023 Governors')
- (United States) Cameron Krutwig (2022–23 Commissioner's)
- (United States) Troy Williams (2023 Governors')
- (Puerto Rico) Chris Ortiz (2023–24 Commissioner's)
- (Puerto Rico) Ricky Ledo (2024 Governors')
- (Puerto Rico) George King & (2024 Governors') (2024–25 Commissioner's)

=== Retired numbers ===
Blackwater Bossing retired number
N°	Player	Position	Tenure
11	Gilbert Bulawan	PF/ C	2014–2016^{[a]}

- ^{a} – The team retired his jersey number in his honor during Blackwater's first game in the 2016 PBA Governors' Cup versus the NLEX Road Warriors on July 16, 2016. He collapsed and died during the team's practice on July 3, 2016.

== Coaches ==
1. Leo Isaac (2014–fired 2018)
2. Bong Ramos (2018–fired 2019)
3. Aries Dimaunahan (2019 as interim coach)
4. Nash Racela (2019–fired 2020)
5. Ariel Vanguardia (2021–2023 as interim coach)
6. Jeffrey Cariaso (2023–2026)
7. Patrick Aquino (2026 as interim coach)

== Season-by-season records ==
List of the last five conferences completed by the Blackwater franchise. For the full-season history, see List of Blackwater Bossing seasons.

Note: GP = Games played, W = Wins, L = Losses, W–L% = Winning percentage

Season	Conference	GP	W	L	W–L%	Finish	Playoffs
2024–25	Commissioner's	12	3	9	.250	11th	Did not qualify
2024–25	Philippine	11	2	9	.182	10th	Did not qualify
2025–26	Philippine	11	1	10	.091	11th	Did not qualify
2025–26	Commissioner's	12	2	10	.167	13th	Did not qualify
2025–26	Governors' Cup	10	3	7	.300	6th (Group B)	Did not qualify
An asterisk (*) indicates one-game playoff; two asterisks (**) indicates team with twice-to-beat advantage

== Awards ==
=== Individual awards ===
PBA Mythical Second Team
- Poy Erram (2017-18)

=== PBA Press Corps Individual Awards ===
Defensive Player of the Year	All-Rookie Team
Poy Erram (2017-18)	Arthur dela Cruz (2015-16); Paul Zamar (2017-18); Ato Ular (2022-23); Sedrick Barefield (2024-25)

=== All-Star Weekend ===
All - Star Selection

2016

- Carlo Lastimosa

2017

- Mac Belo

2018

- Mac Belo
- Poy Erram
- Allein Maliksi

2019

- Mac Belo

2024

- James Yap

== See also ==
- Blackwater Bossing draft history
