= Blackwater Bossing draft history =

The Blackwater Elite first participated in the Philippine Basketball Association (PBA) Draft on August 24, 2014, two months before their first PBA season. Blackwater entered the league through expansion together with Kia Sorento.

Juami Tiongson became the team's first draft choice, the 12th pick in the 2014 PBA draft. Brandon Ganuelas-Rosser is their first number one draft pick in franchise history.

== Selections ==
Basketball positions
PG	Point guard
SG	Shooting guard
SF	Small forward
PF	Power forward
C	Center

Draft	Round	Pick	Player	Pos.	Country of birth*	PBA D-League team	College
2014	1	12	Juami Tiongson	G	Philippines	Blackwater Sports	ADMU
2014	2	23	Frank Golla	F	Philippines		ADMU
2014	3	26	Brian Heruela	G	Philippines	Big Chill Super Chargers	UC
2014	3	27	Maclean Sabellina	F	Philippines	Boracay Rum Waves	STI
2014	3	30	Juneric Baloria	G	Philippines	Big Chill Super Chargers	Perpetual
2014	3	31	Raul Soyud	C	Philippines	Blackwater Sports	UP
2014	3	34	Clark Bautista	G	Philippines	Blackwater Sports	UST
2014	3	35	Ford Ruaya	F/G	Philippines	Hog's Breath Razorbacks	Letran
2015	1	9	Arthur dela Cruz	SF/PF	Philippines	Hapee Fresh Fighters	San Beda
2015	2	13	Almond Vosotros	PG/SG	Philippines	Cebuana Lhuillier Gems	De La Salle
2015	3	23	Jason Melano	SF	Philippines	Cagayan Rising Suns	St. Francis of Assisi
2015	4	34	Keith Agovida	SF	Philippines	KeraMix Mixers	Arellano
2015	5	43	Jawhar Purdy	SG	United States	Wang's Basketball Couriers	Cal State Stanislaus
2015	6	48	Christian Palma	SF	Philippines	Cagayan Rising Suns	Arellano
2015	7	51	Mon Abundo	PG	Philippines	Café France Bakers	CEU
2015	8	54	Randy Dilay	SG	United States	Tanduay Light Rhum Masters	Dominican U
2016	Special draft		Mac Belo	F	Philippines	Phoenix Accelerators	FEU
2016	2	1	Raphael Banal	G	Philippines	Racal Tile Masters	Hope International
2016	3	11	Tristan Perez	C/F	Philippines	BDO-National University	NU
2017	1	3	Raymar Jose	F	Philippines	Cignal HD Hawkeyes	FEU
2017	2	15	Renz Palma	G	Philippines	Tanduay Light Rhum Masters	UE
2017	3	27	Ebrahim Lopez	G	Philippines	Marinerong Pilipino Skippers	UE
2017	4	38	Kyle Neypes	F	Philippines	BDO – NU; JAM Liner; Racal Tile Masters	NU
2017	5	2	Jhon Sumido	G	Philippines	Cobra Iron Men; Cebuana Lhuillier Gems; MP Hotel Warriors	UE
2018	1	2	Bobby Ray Parks Jr.	G	Philippines	NU-Banco De Oro; Hapee Fresh Fighters	NU
2018	3	24	Diego Dario	G	Philippines	AMA	UP
2018	4	34	Dan Alberto	G	Philippines	AMA	UE
2018	5	40	Chris de la Peña	C	Philippines	Batangas-EAC	Letran
2019	Special Draft		Rey Suerte	G/F	Philippines	Che'Lu Bar & Grill Revellers	UV / UE
2019	1	2	Maurice Shaw	C	Philippines		Hutchinson CC
2019	2	14	Richard Escoto	F	Philippines	Phoenix Accelerators	FEU
2019	3	26	Chris Bitoon	G	Philippines	Che'Lu Bar & Grill Revellers	St. Clare College of Caloocan
2019	4	37	Hubert Cani	G	Philippines	Cha Dao Tea Place	FEU
season 46	2	14	Rey Mark Acuno	C	Philippines		UE
season 46	2	15	Joshua Torralba	G/F	United States		La Salle
season 46	3	27	Andre Paras	F/C	United States	AMA Online Education	UP
season 46	4	38	Jun Manzo	G	Philippines		UV / UP
season 46	5	48	Kim Bayquin	G/F	Philippines		FEU
season 46	6	56	Jeson Delfinado	G	Philippines		FEU
season 47	1	1	Brandon Ganuelas-Rosser	C/F	United States		UC Riverside
season 47	1	9	Kurt Lojera	G	Philippines		La Salle
season 47	2	13	Ato Ular	F	Philippines		Letran
season 47	3	25	Daryl Pascual	C	Philippines		Letran
season 47	4	37	Earvin Lacsamana	C	Canada		Champlain
season 47	5	45	Arthur Navasero	G	Philippines		Centennial
season 48	1	2	Christian David	F	Canada		Butler
season 48	2	20	James Kwekuteye	G	Canada		San Beda
season 48	3	26	Clifford Jopia	C	Philippines		San Beda
season 48	4	37	Archie Concepcion	G	Philippines		Arellano
season 48	5	48	Dariel Bayla	F	Philippines		Arellano
season 49
season 49	1	2	Sedrick Barefield	G	United States		Utah
season 49	3	26	DJ Mitchell	G	United States		Hartford
season 49	4	37	Keith Pido	G	Philippines		Perpetual

=== Notes ===
1.All players entering the draft are Filipinos until proven otherwise.
