= 2013 PBA draft =

Player selection in Philippine basketball

General information
- Date: November 3, 2013
- Time: 4:00 pm (PHT)
- Location: Robinson's Midtown Manila
- Network: Sports5

Overview
- League: Philippine Basketball Association
- First selection: Greg Slaughter, Barangay Ginebra San Miguel

The 2013 Philippine Basketball Association (PBA) Rookie Draft was an event, which allows teams to draft players from the amateur ranks. The event was held at Midtown Atrium, Robinson Place Manila on November 3, 2013.

== Draft lottery ==
The lottery determined the team that will obtain the first pick on the draft. The remaining first-round picks and the second-round picks were assigned to teams in reverse order of their cumulative final rankings in the previous season with heavier weight from the results of the Philippine Cup.

Draft order	Team	Final ranking			Total
Draft order	Team	PC	CC	GC	Total
Lottery	GlobalPort Batang Pier	10th	10th	6th	8.8
Lottery	Air21 Express	8th	8th	10th	8.6
3rd	Barako Bull Energy Cola	9th	9th	5th	7.8
4th	Barangay Ginebra San Miguel	6th	2nd	8th	5.4
5th	Petron Blaze Boosters	7th	6th	2nd	5.2
6th	Meralco Bolts	5th	7th	3rd	5.0
7th	Talk 'N Text Tropang Texters	1st	4th	9th	4.3
8th	Alaska Aces	4th	1st	7th	4.0
9th	Rain or Shine Elasto Painters	2nd	5th	4th	3.5
10th	San Mig Coffee Mixers	3rd	3rd	1st	2.1

Lottery teams—green: 67% chance; blue: 33% chance

The lottery was held on October 11, 2013, during the halftime of the Game 1 of the 2013 PBA Governors' Cup Finals at the Mall of Asia Arena in Pasay. The Air21 Express won the rights to the first overall selection against the GlobalPort Batang Pier. Due to a previous transaction, the draft rights of Air21 belonged to the Barangay Ginebra San Miguel. GlobalPort's drafting rights were also previously traded to San Mig Coffee Mixers.

== Draft ==
PG	Point guard	SG	Shooting guard	SF	Small forward	PF	Power forward	C	Center	*	Mythical team member	^{#}	All-star

=== 1st round ===
Round	Pick	Player	Pos.	Country of birth*	Team	PBA D-League team	College
1	1	*Greg Slaughter	C	United States	Barangay Ginebra San Miguel (from Air21)^{[a]}	NLEX Road Warriors	Ateneo
1	2	*Ian Sangalang	C/PF	Philippines	San Mig Coffee Mixers (from Barako Bull via GlobalPort)^{[b]}	NLEX Road Warriors	San Sebastian
1	3	#Raymond Almazan	C/PF	Philippines	Rain or Shine Elasto Painters (from Barako Bull) ^{[c]}	Cagayan Rising Suns	Letran
1	4	James Forrester	SG	Canada	Barako Bull Energy Cola (from Ginebra,^{[d]} traded to Ginebra^{[A]})	Cagayan Rising Suns	Arellano
1	5	*Terrence Romeo	PG/SG	Philippines	Barako Bull Energy Cola (from Petron Blaze,^{[e]} traded to GlobalPort^{[B]})	Big Chill Super Chargers	FEU
1	6	#RR Garcia	PG	Philippines	Barako Bull Energy Cola (from Meralco,^{[f]} traded to GlobalPort^{[C]})	NLEX Road Warriors	FEU
1	7	Isaac Holstein	C	United States	GlobalPort Batang Pier (from Talk 'N Text via Barako Bull and Ginebra) ^{[g]}	Blackwater Sports	West Virginia State
1	8	Ryan Buenafe	SF/SG	Philippines	Alaska Aces	Big Chill Super Chargers	Ateneo
1	9	Alex Nuyles	SG/SF	Philippines	Rain or Shine Elasto Painters	EA Regen Meds	Adamson
1	10	Justin Chua	C	Philippines	San Mig Coffee Mixers	Blackwater Sports	Ateneo

=== 2nd round ===
Note: Air 21 and Alaska switched places in the 5th and 6th picks prior to an earlier trade agreement.

Round	Pick	Player	Pos.	Country of birth*	Team	PBA D-League team	College
2	1	Nico Salva	SF	Philippines	GlobalPort Batang Pier	NLEX Road Warriors	Ateneo
2	2	Jeric Teng	SG	Philippines	Rain or Shine Elasto Painters (from Air21) ^{[h]}	Informatics Icons	UST
2	3	Justin Melton	SG/PG	United States	San Mig Coffee Mixers (from Barako Bull) ^{[i]}	None	Mount Olive
2	4	Jeric Fortuna	PG	Philippines	Barako Bull Energy Cola (from Ginebra) ^{[j]}	Blackwater Sports	UST
2	5	*John Paul Erram	C	Philippines	Talk 'N Text	None	Ateneo
2	6	Eric Camson	PF	Philippines	Air21 Express (from Petron Blaze^{[l]})	NLEX Road Warriors	Adamson
2	7	Robby Celiz	SF	Philippines	Talk 'N Text Tropang Texters	Blackwater Sports	NU
2	8	Chris Exciminiano	SG	Philippines	Alaska Aces	Cagayan Rising Suns	FEU
2	9	Gayford Rodriguez	SG	Philippines	Rain or Shine Elasto Painters	None	UV
2	10	# Carlo Lastimosa	SG	Philippines	Barako Bull Energy Cola (from San Mig Coffee) ^{[m]}	Fruitas Shakers	Saint Benilde

=== 3rd round ===
Round	Pick	Player	Pos.	Country of birth*	Team	PBA D-League team	College
3	1	Joshua Webb	SF/SG	Philippines	Air21 Express	Cagayan Rising Suns	De La Salle
3	2	Jopher Custodio	SF	Philippines	GlobalPort Batang Pier	Jumbo Plastic Linoleum Giants	MLQU
3	3	Darwin Cordero	PG	Philippines	Barako Bull Energy Cola	None	Southern City
3	4	#LA Revilla	PG	Philippines	Barangay Ginebra San Miguel (traded to GlobalPort)^{[D]}	Big Chill Super Chargers	De La Salle
3	5	Sam Marata	SG	Philippines	Petron Blaze Boosters	Blackwater Sports	UP Diliman
3	6	Anjo Caram	PG	Philippines	Meralco Bolts	Fruitas Shakers	San Beda
3	7	Eliud Poligrates	SG/PG	Philippines	Talk 'N Text Tropang Texters	Café France Bakers	SWU
3	8	Raymond Ilagan	PF	Philippines	Alaska Aces	RnW Pacific Pipes Steelmasters	St. Francis
3	9	Ervic Vijandre	SG	Philippines	Rain or Shine Elasto Painters	Wang's Couriers	De La Salle
3	10	JR Cawaling	SF	Philippines	San Mig Coffee Mixers	None	FEU

=== 4th round ===
Round	Pick	Player	Pos.	Country of birth*	Team	PBA D-League team	College
4	1	Angelo Ingco	PG	Philippines	Air21 Express	None	San Beda
4	2	Jett Vidal	PG/SG	Philippines	Barako Bull Energy Cola	Zambales M-Builders	UPHSD
4	3	John Usita	C	United States	Barangay Ginebra San Miguel	None	Shoreline Community
4	4	Nate Matute	SG	United States	Petron Blaze Boosters	Erase XFoliant Erasers	JRU
4	5	Mike Parala	PF/C	Philippines	Meralco Bolts	Café France Bakers	Mapua
4	6	Chris Sumalinog	SF	Philippines	Talk 'N Text Tropang Texters	NLEX Road Warriors	Ateneo

Note: GlobalPort (1st pick), Alaska (8th), Rain or Shine (9th) and San Mig Coffee (10th) passed on this round

=== 5th round ===
Round	Pick	Player	Pos.	Country of birth*	Team	PBA D-League team	College
5	1	Randolph Chua	PG	Philippines	Air21 Express	None	Saint Benilde
5	2	Mike Silungan	SG	United States	Barako Bull Energy Cola	Café France Bakers	UP Diliman
5	3	Alvin Padilla	SG	Philippines	Barangay Ginebra San Miguel	Cebuana Lhuillier Gems	UP Diliman
5	4	Mark Lopez	PG/SG	Philippines	Meralco Bolts	Café France Bakers	UP Diliman
5	5	Byron Villarias	SG	Philippines	Talk 'N Text Tropang Texters	Air21-JRU Heavy Bombers	JRU

Note: Petron Blaze (5th pick) passed on this round

=== 6th round ===
Round	Pick	Player	Pos.	Country of birth*	Team	PBA D-League team	College
6	1	Jens Knuttel	PG	Germany	Barangay Ginebra San Miguel	Café France Bakers	FEU
6	2	Ron Guevarra	PG	Philippines	Meralco Bolts	None	St. Francis

Note: Air21 (2nd pick), Barako Bull (3rd), and Talk 'N Text (7th) passed on this round

=== 7th round ===
Round	Pick	Player	Pos.	Country of birth*	Team	PBA D-League team	College
7	1	Mark Bringas	PF	Philippines	Meralco Bolts	Cagayan Rising Suns	FEU

Note: Barangay Ginebra (4th pick) passed on this round; Meralco passed its supposed 6th pick in the 8th round to end the draft.

== Trades involving draft picks ==
=== Pre-draft trades ===
- ^{a} On August 12, 2012, in a three-team trade, Barangay Ginebra acquired a 2013 first round pick and Elmer Espiritu from Air21, the Express acquired Nonoy Baclao and Rob Reyes from Petron and KG Canaleta and John Wilson from Ginebra, and the Blaze Boosters acquired Magi Sison, Paolo Hubalde and a 2014 second round pick from the Express.
- ^{b} On September 21, 2012, San Mig Coffee Mixers acquired a 2013 first round pick and Wesley Gonzales from Barako Bull in exchange for Josh Urbiztondo. Previously, the Energy Cola (as Air21) acquired the pick and a 2012 second round pick on January 31, 2011, from Powerade in exchange for J.R. Quiñahan. Powerade's franchise was sold to GlobalPort before the 2012-13 season.
- ^{c} On January 20, 2011, in a three-team trade, Rain or Shine acquired a first round pick, a 2011 first round pick, Ronjay Buenafe and Ronnie Matias from Barako Bull (as Air21) and Beau Belga from Meralco, the Express acquired Reed Juntilla, and 2011 and 2013 second round picks from the Bolts, and the Bolts acquired Sol Mercado and Paolo Bugia from the Elasto Painters and Erick Rodriguez from the Express.
- ^{d} On November 16, 2011, in a three-team trade, Barako Bull acquired Jimbo Aquino and a 2013 first round pick from Barangay Ginebra, Ginebra acquired Rico Maierhofer from San Mig Coffee (as B-Meg) and Allein Maliksi from the Energy, and the Llamados acquired Yancy de Ocampo and a 2012 second round pick from Ginebra via the Energy.
- ^{e}
- ^{f}
- ^{g} On June 11, 2013, in a three-team trade, GlobalPort acquired a first round pick and Yousef Taha from Barangay Ginebra in exchange for Japeth Aguilar. Previously, Ginebra acquired the pick from Barako Bull on the same day in exchange for Elmer Espiritu. Previously, in a three-team trade, Barako Bull (as Burger King) acquired 2012 and 2013 first round pick from Talk 'N Text, and 2010 and 2012 first round picks on October 12, 2009, from Barako Energy Coffee via the Tropang Texters; the Coffee Masters acquired Orlando Daroya from the Tropang Texters; and the Tropang Texters acquired Japeth Aguilar from the Whoppers. The Coffee Masters franchise was later sold, first to become the Shopinas.com Clickers/Air21 Express. It was sold again to become the NLEX Road Warriors.
- ^{k} On October 4, 2011, Alaska acquired a 2013 second round pick from Meralco in exchange for Mark Borboran.

=== Draft-day trades ===
- ^{A} The Barangay Ginebra San Miguel re-acquired the draft rights to 4th pick James Forrester from Barako Bull in exchange for Rico Maierhofer and Willy Wilson.
- ^{B} The GlobalPort Batang Pier acquired the draft rights to 5th pick Terrence Romeo from Barako Bull. Previously, Petron acquired the pick from the Energy in exchange for Magi Sison and Mark Isip, then the Blaze Boosters acquired Yousef Taha from GlobalPort in exchange for the pick.
- ^{C} The GlobalPort Batang Pier acquired the draft rights to 6th pick RR Garcia from Barako Bull in exchange for Dennis Miranda.
- ^{D} The Talk 'N Text Tropang Texters acquired the draft rights to 15th pick John Paul Erram from Alaska in exchange for a 2015 second round pick.
- ^{E} The GlobalPort Batang Pier acquired the draft rights to 34th pick LA Revilla, and 2016 and 2017 second round picks from Barangay Ginebra in exchange for a 2014 first round pick.

== Undrafted players ==
Name	Country of birth	College	Notes
Jeckster Apinan	Philippines	JRU	
Janno Baronda	Philippines	UPH-GMA	
Mark Joseph Berry	Philippines	NU	
Jeffrey Bongat	Philippines	UPH-Cavite	
Ildefonso Bulangis	Philippines	JRU	
Michael Calomot	Philippines	PCU	
Jumel Chien	Philippines	Mapua	
Jessie James Collado	Philippines	Lyceum	
Japs Cuan	Philippines	UST	
Ryeon de los Trinos	Philippines	UM	
Francis de la Serna	Philippines	Miami (Ohio)/USC	
Franz Delgado	Philippines	San Sebastian	
Ezekiel Eric Echane	Philippines	JRU	
Jaymo Eguilos	Philippines	FEU	
John Michael Ferrer	Philippines	San Beda-Alabang	
Jerryvi Santos Glorioso	Philippines	RTU/CEU	
John Moises Gonzales	Philippines	FEU	
Ronoel Guevarra, Jr.	Philippines	St. Francis	
Janhell Justin Ignacio	Philippines	Trinity	
Raymund Ilagan	Philippines	St. Francis	
Ralph John Lansang	Philippines	PCU	
John Lopez	Philippines	JRU	
Reigner Macasaet	Philippines	UM	
Raymond Maconocido	Philippines	San Sebastian	
Regilito Malinao	Philippines	UM	
Marlon Monte	Philippines	PUP	
Anjelo Montecastro	Philippines	UP Diliman	
Lend Mark Montilla	Philippines	Universal College	
Dave Najorda	Philippines	San Sebastian	
Mark Joseph Pangilinan	Philippines	St. Clare	
Paul Jordan Payoyo	Philippines	Trinity	
Rodel Ranises	Philippines	Mapua	
Larry Rivera	Philippines	Trinity	
Kliff Richard Romera	Philippines	PUP	
Paul Sanga	Philippines	FEU	
Justine Sanguyo	Philippines	UM/Letran	
Lucas Tagarda	Philippines	UE	
Carlos Fenequito	Philippines	UST	
Joseph Terso	Philippines	NU	
Vince Tinte	Philippines	UST	
Jeff Viernes	Philippines	St. Clare	
Jess Mar Villahermosa	Philippines	San Beda	
Raffy Ynion	Philippines	UPHSD	
