= Meralco Bolts draft history =

The Meralco Bolts first participated in the Philippine Basketball Association (PBA) draft on August 29, 2010, one month before their first PBA season. The Bolts bought the original franchise of the Sta. Lucia Realtors in 2010 when Sta. Lucia disbanded after the 2009–10 season. Meralco received the rights for all of the Sta. Lucia's players and draftees. As an incentive for being a new franchise, the PBA Board of Governors gave Meralco the 11th overall pick.

Shawn Weinstein became the team's first draft choice, the 10th pick in the 2010 PBA draft (draft pick was acquired via trade with the Alaska Aces).

== Selections ==
Basketball positions
PG	Point guard
SG	Shooting guard
SF	Small forward
PF	Power forward
C	Center

Draft	Round	Pick	Player	Place of birth	Position	School
2010	1	10	Shawn Weinstein	United States	PG	St. Edward's
2010	2	11	Riego Gamalinda	Philippines	SG	San Beda
2010	2	14	Ford Arao	Philippines	PF	Ateneo
2010	2	16	Khasim Mirza	Philippines	SG	UST
2011	1	7	Jason Ballesteros	Philippines	C	San Sebastian
2012	1	4	Cliff Hodge	United States	F/C	Hawaii Pacific
2012	2	17	Kelly Nabong	Philippines	F	Santa Rosa JC
2012	3	24	Janus Lozada	Philippines	G/F	Adamson
2012	4	32	Eric Suguitan	Philippines	C	ACSAT
2013	3	26	Anjo Caram	Philippines	PG	San Beda
2013	4	35	Mike Parala	Philippines	PF	Mapua
2013	5	40	Mark Lopez	Philippines	PG	UP Diliman
2013	6	43	Ron Guevarra	Philippines	PG	St. Francis
2013	7	44	Mark Bringas	Philippines	PF	FEU
2014	No draft picks (traded to other teams)					
2015	1	4	Chris Newsome	United States	SF	Ateneo
2015	1	7	Baser Amer	Philippines	PG	San Beda
2015	3	29	Joseph Sedurifa	Philippines	SG	CEU
2016	Special draft		Ed Daquioag	Philippines	G	UST
2016	2	7	Jonathan Grey	Philippines	G/F	Benilde
2016	3	13	Jessie Saitanan	Philippines	C	Mapúa
2016	4	21	Ryusei Koga	Philippines	G	San Beda
2017	3	31	Jebb Bulawan	Philippines	G	Lyceum
2018	1	5	Trevis Jackson	United States	G	Sacramento State
2018	2	14	Bong Quinto	Philippines	G	Letran
2018	3	27	Steven Cudal	Philippines	F	UE
2019	2	18	Aaron Black	Philippines	G	Ateneo
2019	3	29	Michael Cañete	Philippines	F	Arellano
Season 46	1	9	Alvin Pasaol	Philippines	G/F	UE
Season 46	3	33	John Yasa	Philippines	F	PCU
Season 46	4	43	Luis Brill	United States	G	Wheeling
Season 47	2	22	Christian Fajarito	Philippines	C	Letran
Season 47	3	34	JJ Espanola	Philippines	G	UP Diliman
Season 47	4	42	Andrey Armenion	Philippines	G	UE
Season 48	1	8	Brandon Bates	Australia	C	De La Salle
Season 48	3	32	Jolo Mendoza	Philippines	G	Ateneo
Season 48	4	43	Zach Huang	Philippines	F	UST
Season 48	5	54	Jessie Sumoda	Philippines	C	San Sebastian
Season 48	6	62	Shean Jackson	United States	G	Cheyenne HS
Season 49
Season 49	1	11	CJ Cansino	Philippines	G	UP
Season 49	2	23	Kurt Reyson	Philippines	G	Letran
Season 49	3	35	JP Maguliano	Philippines	F	EAC
Season 49	4	43	Jordan Bartlett	United States	G	De La Salle
Season 50
Season 50	1	7	Jason Brickman	United States	PG	LIU Brooklyn
Season 50	2	19	Vince Magbuhos	Italy	PF/C	Adamson
Season 50	3	31	Ethan Galang	United States	SG/SF	UE
Season 50	4	42	Ladis Lepalam	Philippines	C	Benilde
Season 50	5	52	Jeff Comia	Philippines	C	New Era

=== Notes ===
1.All players entering the draft are Filipinos until proven otherwise.
