= Jackson Corpuz =

Filipino basketball player (born 1989)

No. 4 – Imus Bandera
- Position: Power forward
- League: MPBL

Personal information
- Born: February 8, 1989 (age 37) Ilagan, Isabela, Philippines
- Listed height: 6 ft 4 in (1.93 m)
- Listed weight: 180 lb (82 kg)

Career information
- High school: Arellano (Pasay)
- College: PCU
- PBA draft: 2014: Undrafted
- Playing career: 2017–present

Career history
- 2017–2019: Mahindra Floodbuster / Kia Picanto / Columbian Dyip
- 2020–2024: Magnolia Hotshots
- 2025: Converge FiberXers
- 2025: GenSan Warriors
- 2026–present: Imus Bandera

Jackson Corpuz (born February 8, 1989) is a Filipino professional basketball player for the Imus Bandera of the Maharlika Pilipinas Basketball League (MPBL). He was undrafted during the 2014 PBA draft and was later signed by the Mahindra Floodbuster in 2017. He is known as the "Pinoy Fukuda" and is also known for repeatedly dyeing his hair multiple colors.

== Professional career ==
=== PBA D-League ===
After going undrafted in 2014, Corpuz played for the Erase XFoliant Erasers, the Derulo Accelero Oilers, and the Bread Story Smashing Bakers in the PBA D-League. In the quarterfinals of the 2014-15 Aspirants' Cup, he and Jiovanni Jalalon each scored 21 points to force a rubber match for a slot in the semis. But they lost that match to the Café France-CEU Bakers. In the 2015 Foundation Cup, he switched to the Cebuana Lhuillier Gems. Against the MP Hotel Warriors, he scored 26 points in a 118–78 blowout win.

Beginning in the 2016 Aspirants' Cup, he played for the Caida Tile Masters. His team made it to the semifinals that conference and in the Foundation Cup. They made it to the Finals of the 2017 Aspirants' Cup against the Cignal-San Beda Hawkeyes. The Tile Masters lost Game 1, but he bounced back in Game 2 with a double-double of 20 points and 11 rebounds. In Game 3, Hawkeye forward Jason Perkins had 21 points, including a go-ahead three pointer, that gave Cignal the Aspirants' Cup championship.

=== Mahindra Floodbuster / Kia Picanto / Columbian Dyip ===
After averaging 20 points and 9.3 rebounds in the PBA D-League Finals, Corpuz was signed by the Mahindra Floodbuster. On April 10, 2017, he started in his debut, but was fined P5,000 after his debut.

In the 2018 Philippine Cup, Corpuz injured his hand, putting him out for some time. He was injured again, this time an ankle injury after having 12 points and 7 rebounds in a loss to the San Miguel Beermen. In the 2018 Governors' Cup, he had solid performances. In a loss to the Beermen, he had a career-high 28 points and 10 rebounds. He had 19 points and five rebounds in a loss to the Alaska Aces. At the end of that season, he received a three-year contract.

In the 2019 Philippine Cup, Corpuz had 21 points and 11 rebounds in an upset win over the Beermen. In their rematch in the Commissioner's Cup, he suffered an ACL sprain and a meniscus tear. He returned in the Governors' Cup in a win over the Northport Batang Pier.

=== Magnolia Hotshots ===
After their season ended, the Magnolia Hotshots and the Dyip worked out a trade that sent Corpuz to Magnolia, and Aldrech Ramos to Columbian. Before the 2020 Philippine Cup was suspended, he had 16 points and 13 rebounds in his debut. Following the suspension, he had 20 points on 8-of-12 shooting and 11 rebounds against Barangay Ginebra. This started a six-game winning streak that ended when they were eliminated by the Phoenix Super LPG Fuel Masters.

In the 2021 Philippine Cup, Corpuz finished the elimination round leading the league with a career-high 6.6 rebounds per game. During Game 3 of the Finals, against the TnT Tropang Giga, he had an infamous tackle on Troy Rosario while Rosario was still in the air. As a result, Rosario had a bad fall and dislocated his finger and was also revealed to have suffered spinal shock, while Corpuz was ejected from the game. He then had to pay a P20,000 fine. The Hotshots lost that series, and both he and Rosario have made peace.

Corpuz signed a two-year deal with the Hotshots. He led the league in field goal percentage in the 2021 Governors' Cup, shooting 62.5% for that conference.

On August 2, 2024, Corpuz was released by the Hotshots.

=== Converge FiberXers ===
On March 14, 2025, Corpuz signed with the Converge FiberXers.

== PBA career statistics ==
Legend
GP	Games played	MPG	Minutes per game	FG%	Field-goal percentage
3FG%	3-point field-goal percentage	4P%	4-point field-goal percentage	FT%	Free-throw percentage
RPG	Rebounds per game	APG	Assists per game	SPG	Steals per game
BPG	Blocks per game	PPG	Points per game	127	Career high

As of the end of 2024–25 season

=== Season-by-season averages ===
Year	Team	GP	MPG	FG%	3P%	4P%	FT%	RPG	APG	SPG	BPG	PPG
2016–17	Mahindra / Kia	17	17.6	.440	.000	—	.688	5.8	.6	.3	.5	6.3
2017–18	Kia / Columbian	28	16.9	.509	.000	—	.633	4.8	.8	1.0	.8	7.6
2019	Columbian	28	23.3	.477	.327	—	.597	5.9	1.0	1.1	.7	10.0
2020	Magnolia	12	24.4	.474	.333	—	.750	6.6	.9	.3	.3	7.6
2021	Magnolia	40	12.1	.469	.333	—	.638	2.9	.4	.3	.3	4.0
2022–23	Magnolia	45	9.8	.408	.175	—	.576	2.2	.5	.2	.2	3.2
2023–24	Magnolia	9	6.9	.478	.200	—	1.000	1.0	.3	—	.1	2.8
2024–25	Converge	11	7.7	.474	.167	—	.444	2.2	—	.2	.2	2.1
Career		190	14.7	.466	.255	—	.627	3.8	.6	.5	.4	5.5
