= 2013 PBA D-League Foundation Cup =

2013 PBA PBA D-League Foundation Cup
- Duration: March 12, 2013 – June 11, 2013
- TV partner(s): Sports5; IBC

Finals
- Champions: Blackwater Sports (PBA D-League)
- Runners-up: NLEX Road Warriors (PBA D-League)

PBA PBA D-League Foundation Cup chronology
- < 2012 2014 >

The 2013 PBA D-League Foundation Cup is the second conference of the 2012-13 PBA Developmental League season. There are three new teams participating the league: Jumbo Plastic Linoleum Giants, Hog's Breath Cafe Razorbacks and EA Regen Med.

== Format ==
The following format will be observed for the duration of the tournament:

- Single-round robin eliminations; 10 games per team; Teams are then seeded by basis on win–loss records. In case of tie, playoffs will be held only for the #2 and #6 seeds.
- The top two teams after the elimination round will automatically advance to the semifinals.
- Quarterfinals:
  - QF1: #3 team vs. #6 team (#3 seed twice-to-beat)
  - QF2: #4 team vs. #5 team (#4 seed twice-to-beat)
- The winners of the quarterfinals will challenge the top two teams in a best-of-three semifinals series. Matchups are:
  - SF1: #1 vs. QF2
  - SF2: #2 vs. QF1
- The winners in the semifinals advance to the best of three Finals.

== Elimination round ==
=== Team standings ===
Team	Wins	Losses	PCT	GB	Winning difference
NLEX Road Warriors	9	2	0.828	--	
Black Water Sports	8	3	0.737	1.0	
Boracay Rum Waves	7	4	0.646	2.0	+9
Fruitas Shakers	7	4	0.646	2.0	−9
Boracay Rum Waves	7	4	0.646	2.0	
Big Chill Super Chargers	6	5	0.545	3.0	+25
EA Regen Med	6	5	0.545	3.0	+11
Cebuana Lhuillier Gems	6	5	0.545	3.0	−15
Cagayan Rising Suns	6	5	0.545	3.0	−21
Café France Bakers	5	6	0.455	4.0	
Jumbo Plastic Linoleum Giants	4	7	0.374	5.0	
Informatics Icons	1	10	0.091	8.0	+15
Hog's Breath Cafe Razorbacks	1	10	0.091	8.0	−15

=== Schedule ===
Team ╲ Game	1	2	3	4	5	6	7	8	9	10	11
Jumbo Plastic Linoleum Giants	FS	HBC	BRW	CFB	CRS	BS	CLG	ICI	BCSC	ERM	NRW
Big Chill	NLEX	HBC	BRW	CFB	CRS	FS	BS	ICI	JPLG	ERM	CLG
Black Water	CFB	CRS	FS	CLG	ICI	JPLG	BCSC	ERM	NRW	HBC	BRW
Boracay Rhum	CLG	ICI	JPLG	BCSC	ERM	NRW	HBC	CFB	FS	CRS	BS
Café France	BS	ICI	JPLG	BCSC	ERM	NRW	HBC	CRS	FS	CLG	BRW
Cagayan	BS	ICI	JPLG	FS	BCSC	ERM	NRW	HBC	CLG	CFB	BRW
Cebuana Lhuillier	BRW	FS	NRW	BS	HBC	ICI	JPLG	ERM	BCSC	CRS	CFB
EA	HBC	BRW	CFB	CRS	FS	CLG	BS	ICI	BCSC	JPLG	NRW
Fruitas	JPLG	CLG	BS	CRS	BCSC	ERM	NRW	ICI	HBC	BRW	CFB
Hog's Breath	JPLG	BCSC	ERM	NRW	CLG	BRW	CFB	CRS	FS	BS	ICI
Informatics	BRW	CFB	CRS	BS	CLG	JPLG	BCSC	FS	ERM	NRW	HBC
NLEX	BCSC	CLG	HBC	BRW	CFB	CRS	FS	BS	ICI	ERM	JPLG

= Win; = OT win; = Loss; = OT loss

=== Results ===
Team	BCSC	BS	BRW	CFB	CRS	CLG	ERM	FS	HBC	ICI	JPLG	NRW
Big Chill					—		—		63–69		69–70	—
Black Water			96–89	83–80	—			91–95**	—	89–73		—
Boracay Rhum	60–82	—				64–66	85–75	—		—	87–67	
Café France	80–75	—			—			73–63		84–77	—	
Cagayan	92–93	85–89*		73–67		—				—	—	
Cebuana Lhuillier		80–87	—		63–54			72–75	—		71–90	—
EA Med	67–71*		103–92						—		105–79	86–103
Fruitas	83–75	95–91**	63–54	74–80		75–72					81–56	
Hog's Breath	69–63	75–85	68–72			62–84	58–83			—	55–81	54–90
Informatics	63–92	73–89	85–93	77–84*	56–98	76–101		85–93*	81–66		75–80	96–64
Jumbo Plastic	70–69	—	—	—	—	90–71	—	—	81–55	80–75		—
NLEX	77–86*			85–54		64–71	—		—		81–70	

Legend: Blue = left column team win; Red = top row team win.
Matches with lighter background shading were decided after overtime.

== Bracket ==
Quarterfinals (#3 and #4 seed twice-to-beat)
4	Fruitas	0
5	Big Chill	2
3	Boracay Rum	1
6	EA	0

Semifinals (#1 and #2 seed advance to semis) (Best-of-3)
1	NLEX	2
5	Big Chill	0
2	Black Water	2
3	Boracay Rum	1

Finals (Best-of-3)
1	NLEX	0
2	Black Water	2

== Quarterfinals ==
=== Boracay Rum vs. EA ===
May 21

Boracay Rum Waves 71, EA Regen Med 68
Boracay Rum wins series in one game.

Blue Eagle Gym, Quezon City

=== Fruitas vs. Big Chill ===
May 21

Fruitas Shakers 72, Big Chill Super Chargers 77

Blue Eagle Gym, Quezon City

May 23

Fruitas Shakers 83, Big Chill Super Chargers 89 (OT)
Big Chill wins series in two games

Blue Eagle Gym, Quezon City

== Semifinals ==
=== NLEX-Big Chill series ===
NLEX Road Warriors 66, Big Chill Super Chargers 59

NLEX Road Warriors 80, Big Chill Super Chargers 71
NLEX wins series, 2–0

=== Blackwater-Boracay Rum series ===
Blackwater Sports 79, Boracay Rum Waves 69

Blackwater Sports 65, Boracay Rum Waves 69

Blackwater Sports 82, Boracay Rum Waves 74
Blackwater wins series, 2–1

== Finals ==
June 6

NLEX Road Warriors 67, Black Water Sports 70

Ynares Sports Arena, Pasig

June 11

NLEX Road Warriors 74, Black Water Sports 80
Black Water wins series, 2–0

Ynares Sports Arena, Pasig

== See also ==
- List of developmental and minor sports leagues
- PBA Developmental League
- Philippine Basketball Association
