= 2016 PBA draft =

Player selection in Philippine basketball

General information
- Date: October 30, 2016
- Time: 3:30 PM
- Location: Robinsons Place Manila
- Networks: Sports5 (TV5, PBA Rush, Sports5.ph)

Overview
- League: Philippine Basketball Association
- First selection: Raphael Banal (Blackwater Elite) (Note: The 2016 draft composed of two draft pools: the Gilas pool, which consists of players from the Gilas Pilipinas program and the regular pool. The pick order for the Gilas draft was not revealed and the regular draft started in the second round. Banal was drafted as the first pick of the second round.)

The 2016 Philippine Basketball Association (PBA) rookie draft was an event which allows teams to draft players from the amateur ranks. The league determined the drafting order based on the performance of the member teams for the 2015–16 season, with the worst team picking first, as a replacement for its lottery system after the controversies that surrounded the 2014 draft.

The league was supposed to hold a special draft for players from the national team, popularly called Gilas, separately from the regular one for other rookies. However, a consensus lead to an agreement that the cadet players will not be drafted but will be distributed to each team instead.

The event was held at the Midtown Atrium, Robinsons Place Manila on October 30, 2016.

== Draft order ==
The draft order was determined based from the overall performance of the teams from the previous season. The Philippine Cup final ranking comprises 40% of the points, while the rankings of the Commissioner's and Governors' Cups are 30% each.

Draft order	Team	Final ranking			Total
Draft order	Team	PHIL	COM	GOV	Total
1st	Blackwater Elite	10th	10th	12th	10.6
2nd	Star Hotshots	9th	8th	11th	9.3
3rd	Phoenix Fuel Masters	8th*	11th	8th	8.9
4th	Mahindra Floodbuster	11th	9th	5th	8.6
5th	GlobalPort Batang Pier	4th	12th	10th	8.2
6th	NLEX Road Warriors	7th	7th	7th	7.0
7th	Meralco Bolts	12th	4th	2nd	6.6
8th	TNT KaTropa	6th	6th	3rd	5.1
9th	Rain or Shine Elasto Painters	3rd	1st	9th	4.2
10th	Barangay Ginebra San Miguel	5th	5th	1st	3.8
11th	Alaska Aces	2nd	2nd	6th	3.2
12th	San Miguel Beermen	1st	3rd	4th	2.5

* - Phoenix's previous franchisee competed as the Barako Bull Energy during the Philippine Cup

=== Special draft for Gilas pool players ===
There was a separate draft for the players in the Gilas pool. The draft rights for the special draft could not be traded. The drafted Gilas players were not allowed to be traded for two years. All players were allowed to play for the teams that drafted them but were pulled out two months before an official FIBA tournament.

As part of the agreement between the PBA and the Samahang Basketbol ng Pilipinas, all 12 teams released one player from their roster to the Gilas pool, in addition to the player that they selected in this special draft.

The draft order was supposed to be announced on October 27. However, the PBA board agreed that instead of determining the order for the special draft, representatives from the 12 ballclubs agreed to farm out one cadet player per team that was distributed to each team by the board. The results of the consensus was not released during that day and the PBA opted to reveal the results on draft night before the regular draft began.

== Draft ==
PG	Point guard	SG	Shooting guard	SF	Small forward	PF	Power forward	C	Center	*	Mythical team member	^{#}	All-Star

=== Special draft ===
Note: The Special draft for Gilas players is considered as the first round of the draft; the regular draft is listed as the second round onwards.

Team	Player	Pos.	Country of birth*	PBA D-League team	College
Alaska Aces	Carl Bryan Cruz^{#}	PF	Philippines	Cafe France Bakers	FEU
Barangay Ginebra San Miguel	Kevin Ferrer^{#}	SF/PF	Philippines	Tanduay Light Rhum Masters	UST
Blackwater Elite	Mac Belo^{#}	PF/SF	Philippines	Phoenix Accelerators	FEU
GlobalPort Batang Pier	Von Pessumal^{#}	SG/SF	Philippines	Tanduay Light Rhum Masters	Ateneo
Mahindra Floodbuster	Russel Escoto	C/PF	Philippines	Phoenix Accelerators	FEU
Meralco Bolts	Ed Daquioag^{#}	SG	Philippines	Phoenix Accelerators	UST
NLEX Road Warriors	Alfonzo Gotladera^{#}	C	Philippines	Tanduay Light Rhum Masters	Ateneo
Phoenix Fuel Masters	Matthew Wright^{*}	SG/SF	Canada	none	St. Bonaventure
Rain or Shine Elasto Painters	Mike Tolomia^{#}	PG/SG	Philippines	Phoenix Accelerators	FEU
San Miguel Beermen	Arnold Van Opstal^{#}	C	Germany	Hapee Fresh Fighters	DLSU
Star Hotshots	Jio Jalalon^{#}	PG	Philippines	Caida Tile Masters	Arellano
TNT KaTropa	Roger Pogoy^{*}	SG/SF	Philippines	Phoenix Accelerators	FEU

=== Regular draft ===
==== 2nd round ====
Round	Pick	Player	Pos.	Country of birth*	Team	PBA D-League team	College
2	1	Raphael Banal	PG/SG	Philippines	Blackwater Elite	Racal Tile Masters	Hope International
2	2	Gelo Alolino	PG	Philippines	Phoenix Fuel Masters (from Star via GlobalPort)^{[a]}	Tanduay Light Rhum Masters	NU
2	3	Jammer Jamito	PF/C	Philippines	Barangay Ginebra San Miguel (from Phoenix)^{[b]}	AMA Online Education Titans	Saint Clare
2	4	Joseph Eriobu	SF/PF	Hong Kong	Mahindra Floodbuster	Caida Tile Masters	Mapúa
2	5	Chris Javier	C/PF	Philippines	Star Hotshots (from GlobalPort)^{[c]}	Caida Tile Masters	UE
2	6	Rashawn McCarthy	SG/PG	United States	San Miguel Beermen (from NLEX)^{[d]}	AMA Online Education Titans	SUNY Old Westbury
2	7	Jonathan Grey^{#}	SG/SF	Philippines	Meralco Bolts	Racal Tile Masters	DLS-Benilde
2	8	Reden Celda	PG/SG	Philippines	NLEX Road Warriors (from TNT)^{[e]}	Tanduay Light Rhum Masters	NU
2	–	PASS			Rain or Shine Elasto Painters		
2	9	Jericho De Guzman	C	Philippines	Barangay Ginebra San Miguel	Z.C. Mindanao Aguilas	DLS-Benilde
2	-	PASS			Alaska Aces		
2	10	Jeoffrey Javillonar	PF	Philippines	Phoenix Fuel Masters (from San Miguel)^{[f]}	Tanduay Light Rhum Masters	NU

Note: Rain or Shine (9th pick) and Alaska (11th) passed in this round

==== 3rd round ====
Round	Pick	Player	Pos.	Country of birth*	Team	PBA D-League team	College
3	11	Tristan Perez	C/PF	Philippines	Blackwater Elite^{[g]}	BDO-National University	NU
3	-	PASS			Rain or Shine Elasto Painters (from Star via Phoenix)^{[h]}		
3	12	Al Francis Tamsi	SG	Philippines	GlobalPort Batang Pier (from Phoenix)^{[i]}	Phoenix Accelerators	FEU
3	13	Jessie Saitanan	C	Philippines	Meralco Bolts (from Mahindra)^{[j]}	Bread Story Smashing Bakers	Mapúa
3	-	PASS			Alaska Aces (from GlobalPort)^{[k]}		
3	-	PASS			Rain or Shine Elasto Painters (from NLEX)^{[l]}		
3	14	Jovit Dela Cruz	SG	Philippines	San Miguel Beermen	LiverMarin Guardians - San Sebastian College – Recoletos	SSC-R
3	15	Ryan Arambulo	SG	United States	GlobalPort Batang Pier (from Meralco)^{[m]}	AMA Online Education Titans	Cal State Fullerton
3	16	Paolo Javelona	SG/PG	Philippines	Phoenix Fuel Masters (from TNT)^{[n]}	BDO-National University	NU
3	-	PASS			Rain or Shine Elasto Painters		
3	17	Cedrick Ablaza	PF	Philippines	Mahindra Floodbuster (from Barangay Ginebra)^{[o]}	Cagayan Rising Suns	STI
3	-	PASS			Alaska Aces		
3	18	Alejandrino Iñigo, Jr.	PG	Philippines	Phoenix Fuel Masters (from San Miguel)^{[p]}	Phoenix Accelerators	FEU

==== 4th round ====
Round	Pick	Player	Pos.	Country of birth*	Team	PBA D-League team	College
4	19	Jan Jamon	SG	Philippines	Mahindra Floodbuster	Cafe France Bakers	EAC
4	20	Spencer Eman	C	Philippines	GlobalPort Batang Pier	Derulo Accelero Oilers	NU
4	21	Ryusei Koga	SG/PG	Philippines	Meralco Bolts	Hapee Fresh Fighters	San Beda
4	22	Timothy Habelito	SF	New Zealand	TNT KaTropa	Cafe France Bakers	QUT

Note: Blackwater, Star, Phoenix, NLEX, Barangay Ginebra and San Miguel passed in this round

==== 5th round ====
Round	Pick	Player	Pos.	Country of birth*	Team	PBA D-League team	College
5	23	Paolo Pontejos	PG/SG	Philippines	Mahindra Floodbuster	Wang's Basketball Couriers	JRU
5	24	Mikee Reyes	PG	Philippines	TNT KaTropa	Junior Powerade Tigers	UP

Note: GlobalPort and Meralco passed in this round

==== 6th round ====
Round	Pick	Player	Pos.	Country of birth*	Team	PBA D-League team	College
6	25	Levi Hernandez	SG/SF	Philippines	TNT KaTropa	Fruitas Shakers	Arellano

Note: Mahindra passed in this round

== Trades involving draft picks ==
=== Pre-draft trades ===
Note: The rights to Air21's and Barako Bull's draft picks were retained by NLEX and Phoenix respectively.

- ^{a} On July 3, 2015, Barako Bull (now Phoenix) acquired a first round pick from GlobalPort in exchange for Joseph Yeo. Previously, the Batang Pier acquired this pick and a 2018 second round pick on August 24, 2014, from Star (as San Mig Coffee) in exchange for 2014 and 2016 first round picks.
- ^{b} On August 25, 2015, Ginebra acquired Nico Salva and a 2016 first round pick from Barako Bull (Phoenix) in exchange for Jens Knuttel, Emman Monfort, and Josh Urbiztondo.
- ^{c} On August 24, 2014, Star (as San Mig Coffee) acquired 2014 and 2016 first round picks from GlobalPort in exchange for 2014 and 2016 first round picks.
- ^{d} On July 25, 2014, San Miguel acquired a 2016 first round pick from NLEX in exchange for a 2015 first round pick.
- ^{e} On January 20, 2014, Air21 (NLEX) acquired Sean Anthony, Eliud Poligrates, and a 2016 first round pick from Talk 'N Text in exchange for Niño Canaleta.
- ^{f} On August 24, 2014, Phoenix (then known as Barako Bull) acquired Jojo Duncil, Chico Lañete, a second round pick and a 2016 first round pick from San Miguel in exchange for a first round pick.
- ^{g} On October 27, 2016, Blackwater re-acquired a second round draft pick and acquired James Forrester from NLEX in exchange for Carlo Lastimosa. Previously, NLEX acquired the pick, a 2017 second round pick, and Juneric Baloria on September 12, 2014, from the Elite in a three-team trade with Meralco.
- ^{h} On September 24, 2015, Rain or Shine acquired a second round pick from Barako Bull (Phoenix) in exchange for Ryan Araña. Previously, Barako Bull acquired this pick from Star in exchange for Josh Urbiztondo.
- ^{i} On January 8, 2015, GlobalPort acquired a 2016 second round pick and Dennis Miranda from Barako Bull (Phoenix) in exchange for Sol Mercado.
- ^{j} On October 7, 2015, Meralco acquired 2016 and 2017 second round picks from Mahindra in a three-team trade with NLEX.
- ^{k}
- ^{l} On December 6, 2013, Rain or Shine acquired a 2016 second round pick from Air21 (NLEX) in exchange for Ronnie Matias.
- ^{m} On October 11, 2013, GlobalPort acquired Chris Ross, Chris Timberlake, and 2016 and 2017 second round picks from Meralco in exchange for Gary David and A. J. Mandani.
- ^{n} On October 8, 2015, Barako Bull (Phoenix) acquired a second round pick from Talk 'N Text in exchange for Dylan Ababou.
- ^{o}
- ^{p} On February 18, 2014, Barako Bull (Phoenix) acquired Jason Deutchman, and 2016 and 2017 second round picks from San Miguel in exchange for Rico Maierhofer in a four-team trade with GlobalPort and Air21 (NLEX).

=== Draft-day trades ===
None exercised.

== Undrafted players ==
Out of 55 players who signified their intention to join the rookie draft, 38 were selected by their teams in the draft proper, while 16 were undrafted. Charles Caluya, the oldest (43) and the shortest (5'7) applicant for the draft, was excluded from the final list for health reasons.

Name	College	PBA D-League team
John Ambulodto	St. Clare	Racal
Jaycee John Asuncion	UPHSD / JRU	Wang's / Racal
Gene Belleza	UE	
Jerald Cueto	College of the Canyon	
Cris Jordan de la Paz	JRU	
Erwin Duran	UE	
Jairold Flores	UE	
Dexter Garcia	St. Benilde	
Jayson Ibay	St. Clare	Racal
Aaron Jeruta	CEU	CafeFrance
Gino Jumao-as	UE	ZC Mindanao
Jhygruz Laude	LPU	Bread Story
Mc Jour Luib	Letran	
Edsel Mag-isa	Univ. of Batangas	
Jon Kervin Ortuoste	San Sebastian	
John Marco Tayongtong	EAC	Cagayan
Billy Ray Robles	NIPSC	Racal
