= Kirk Long =

American former basketball player

Personal information
- Born: September 1, 1989 (age 37) Usak, Turkey
- Listed height: 6 ft 1 in (1.85 m)

Career information
- College: Ateneo
- Position: Shooting guard / Small forward
- Number: 12

Career history
- 2011: NLEX Road Warriors (D League)

Career highlights
- 4× UAAP champion (2008, 2009, 2010, 2011); 2× PCCL champion (2009, 2010, 2011); 2x PBA D-League champion (2011 Foundation, 2011 Aspirant's)

Jeffrey Kirk Long (born September 1, 1989) is a former American college basketball player for Ateneo Blue Eagles in the UAAP.

== Early life ==
Long was born on September 1, 1989, at Usak, Turkiye.

== Career ==
=== Ateneo ===
Long played on the Ateneo Blue Eagles men's basketball team under head coach Norman Black. He won 4 UAAP championships with the team.

Long also played for Ateneo's baseball team starting in 2008. Long was part of the Ateneo team that lost in the 2012 Finals against the NU Bulldogs.

=== PBA Aspirations ===
Long attempted to be a player in the country's league Philippine Basketball Association. But like Alex Compton, Long can only play as an import. He did not play as an import either.

=== Later years ===
Kirk Long is currently coaching at Faith Academy Interntational School Manila. Head coach of the varsity Vanguards, along side with Joshua Manthe.

== Personal life ==
Long married Tata Garcia in 2013.
