= 2012 PBA D-League Aspirants' Cup =

2012 PBA D-League Aspirant's Cup
- Duration: October 23, 2012 - February 26, 2013
- TV partner(s): Sports5; IBC

Finals
- Champions: NLEX Road Warriors
- Runners-up: Cagayan Rising Suns

Awards
- Finals MVP: Ian Sangalang

PBA D-League Aspirant's Cup chronology
- < 2011 2013 >

The 2012 PBA D-League Aspirant's Cup is the first of the two conferences of the 2012-13 PBA Developmental League season. There are three new teams participating the league: JRU Heavy Bombers, Fruitas Shakers and Informatics Icons.

== Format ==
The following format will be observed for the duration of the tournament:

- Single-round robin eliminations; 10 games per team; Teams are then seeded by basis on win–loss records. In case of tie, playoffs will be held only for the #2 and #6 seeds.
- The top two teams after the elimination round will automatically advance to the semifinals.
- Quarterfinals:
  - QF1: #3 team vs. #6 team (#3 seed twice-to-beat)
  - QF2: #4 team vs. #5 team (#4 seed twice-to-beat)
- The winners of the quarterfinals will challenge the top two teams in a best-of-three semifinals series. Matchups are:
  - SF1: #1 vs. QF2
  - SF2: #2 vs. QF1
- The winners in the semifinals advance to the best of three Finals.

== Team standings ==
Team	Wins	Losses	PCT	GB	PD
NLEX Road Warriors	9	1	0.900	--	
Black Water Sports	8	2	0.800	1.0	
Cagayan Rising Suns	6	4	0.600	3.0	+18
Big Chill Super Chargers	6	4	0.600	3.0	−18
JRU Heavy Bombers	5	5	0.500	4.0	+32
Cebuana Lhuillier Gems	5	5	0.500	4.0	+3
Fruitas Shakers	5	5	0.500	4.0	−35
Boracay Rum Waves	4	6	0.400	5.0	+4
Café France Bakers	4	6	0.400	5.0	−4
Erase XFoliant Erasers	2	8	0.200	7.0	
Informatics Icons	1	9	0.100	8.0	

=== Schedule ===
Team ╲ Game	1	2	3	4	5	6	7	8	9	10
Big Chill	JRU	BWS	CLG	BRW	NRW	FRU	EXF	CRS	INF	CFB
Black Water	BCSC	BRW	FRU	JRU	INF	NRW	CFB	CLG	CRS	EXF
Boracay Rhum	CLG	CRS	NRW	BWS	BCSC	JRU	INF	EXF	CFB	FRU
Café France	FRU^	CRS	EXF	CLG	INF	NRW	BWS	JRU	BRW	BCSC
Cagayan	INF	BRW	EXF	CFB	CLG	NRW	JRU	BCSC	FRU	BWS
Cebuana Lhuillier	BRW	FRU	BCSC	CFB	CRS	EXF	NRW	BWS	INF	JRU
Erase XFoliant	NRW	CRS	INF	CFB	FRU	CLG	BCSC	BRW	JRU	BWS
Fruitas	CFB^	CLG	BWS	NRW	EXF	BCSC	INF	JRU	CRS	BRW
Informatics	CRS	EXF	NRW	JRU	CFB	BWS	BRW	FRU	BCSC	CLG
JRU	BCSC	NRW	INF	BWS	BRW	CRS	CFB	FRU	EXF	CLG
NLEX	EXF	BRW	JRU	INF	FRU	BCSC	CRS	CFB	BWS	CLG

= Win; = OT win; = Win by forfeit; = Loss; = OT loss; = Loss by forfeit

^{^} Fruitas eventually won the game, 88-82 but their win was forfeited because of fielding an ineligible player that gave the win to the Bakers.

=== Results ===
Team	BCSC	BWS	BRW	CFB	CRS	CLG	EXF	FRU	INF	JRU	NLEX
Big Chill		74–63	68–59	76–69	59–77	81–61	88–68	81–88	87–94	77–76	
Black Water			84–60	81–60	93–70	91–80	82–76	69–64	67–64	88–83	
Boracay Rhum				62–58	79–88	76–86	82–61	61–73	74–66	63–53	
Cafe France					70–85	68–76	73–58	82–88	78–66	62–66	
Cagayan						86–82	78–91	107–75	89–85	100–103*	
Cebuana Lhuillier							92–74	90–91	112–94	77–73	
Erase XFoliant								73–78	79–68	61–74	
Fruitas									85–74	64–100	
Informatics										74–86	
JRU											
NLEX	91–67	70–68	88–73	52–66	84–75	89–76	101–71	92–73	88–81	91–87	

Legend: Blue = left column team win; Red = top row team win.
Matches with lighter background shading were decided after overtime.

== Bracket ==
Quarterfinals (#3 & #4 seed twice-to-beat)
4	Big Chill	0+1
5	JRU	2
3	Cagayan	1+1
6	Cebuana Lhuillier	1

Semifinals (Best-of-3)
1	NLEX	2
5	JRU	1
2	Black Water	1
3	Cagayan	2

Finals (Best-of-3)
1	NLEX	2
3	Cagayan	0

== Quarterfinals ==
=== Cagayan vs. Cebuana Lhuillier ===
February 5

Cagayan Rising Suns 83, Cebuana Lhuillier Gems 84

San Juan Arena, San Juan City

February 7

Cagayan Rising Suns 88, Cebuana Lhuillier Gems 73
Cagayan wins series in two games

Ynares Sports Arena, Pasig

=== Big Chill vs. JRU ===
February 5

Big Chill Super Chargers 61, JRU Heavy Bombers 63

San Juan Arena, San Juan City

February 7

Big Chill Super Chargers 71, JRU Heavy Bombers 80
JRU wins series in two games

Ynares Sports Arena, Pasig

== Semifinals ==
=== NLEX-JRU series ===
February 12

NLEX Road Warriors 105, JRU Heavy Bombers 85

Ynares Sports Arena, Pasig

February 14

NLEX Road Warriors 94, JRU Heavy Bombers 108

Ynares Sports Arena, Pasig

February 19

NLEX Road Warriors 87, JRU Heavy Bombers 85
NLEX wins series, 2–1

San Juan Arena, San Juan City

=== Black Water-Cagayan series ===
February 12

Black Water Sports 76, Cagayan Rising Suns 91

Ynares Sports Arena, Pasig

February 14

Black Water Sports 86, Cagayan Rising Suns 79

Ynares Sports Arena, Pasig

February 19

Black Water Sports 68, Cagayan Rising Suns 80
Cagayan wins series, 2–1

San Juan Arena, San Juan City

== Finals ==
February 21

NLEX Road Warriors 87, Cagayan Rising Suns 63

Blue Eagle Gym, Quezon City

February 26

NLEX Road Warriors 82, Cagayan Rising Suns 71
NLEX wins series, 2-0

San Juan Arena, San Juan City

== See also ==
- List of developmental and minor sports leagues
- PBA Developmental League
- Philippine Basketball Association
