= 2014 PBA draft =

Player selection in Philippine basketball

General information
- Date(s): August 24, 2014
- Time: 4:00 pm (PHT)
- Location: Robinsons Place Manila
- Network(s): Sports5

Overview
- League: Philippine Basketball Association
- First selection: Stanley Pringle (GlobalPort Batang Pier)

The Gatorade 2014 Philippine Basketball Association (PBA) Rookie Draft was an event which allowed teams to draft players from the amateur ranks. The event was held at Midtown Atrium, Robinsons Place Manila on August 24, 2014.

== Draft lottery ==
The lottery determined the team that will obtain the first pick in the draft. The remaining first-round picks and the second-round picks were assigned to teams in reverse order of their cumulative final rankings in the previous season with heavier weight from the results of the Philippine Cup.

Draft order	Team	Final ranking			Total
Draft order	Team	PHIL	COM	GOV	Total
Lottery	GlobalPort Batang Pier	7th	10th	10th	8.8
Lottery	Meralco Bolts	9th	7th	9th	8.2
3rd	Barako Bull Energy	6th	9th	8th	7.5
4th	Air21 Express	10th	4th	7th	7.3
5th	Alaska Aces	8th	6th	3rd	6.2
6th	Barangay Ginebra San Miguel	3rd	8th	6th	5.4
7th	San Miguel Beermen	4th	5th	5th	4.6
8th	Talk 'N Text Tropang Texters	5th	2nd	4th	3.5
9th	Rain or Shine Elasto Painters	2nd	4th	2nd	2.3
10th	San Mig Super Coffee Mixers	1st	1st	1st	1.0

Lottery teams—green: 67% chance; blue: 33% chance

The lottery was held on July 1, 2014, before the start of the Game 1 of the 2014 PBA Governors' Cup Finals at the Mall of Asia Arena in Pasay. The GlobalPort Batang Pier won the rights to the first overall selection against the Meralco Bolts. Due to a previous transaction, the draft rights of Meralco belongs to the Rain or Shine Elasto Painters from the Ronjay Buenafe trade on August 28, 2012.

=== Controversy ===
The matter on how the draft lottery is conducted became the subject of criticism from the fans and from Rain or Shine coach Yeng Guiao for lacking credibility and transparency. The league used three balls (two represents GlobalPort and one for Meralco) and were placed in a white box. Commissioner Chito Salud placed the balls inside the white box and drew the winner of the draft, without removing his hand first after placing the balls in the box. A formal request by Rain or Shine for a re-draw was sent to the league's board of governors. On July 4, Commissioner Salud apologized on the crudeness of the draft lottery procedures; however, he insisted that it was an honest mistake on their part by not checking out the minor details of the lottery and its proceedings.

During an emergency meeting of the Board of Governors, it was decided that no re-draw will be held after Rain or Shine and the board accepted the public apology of Commissioner Salud. The league's board and management committee will review the procedures of the lottery draw to prevent the issues raised to happen again. Since then, the league no longer holds a draft lottery. The team with the worst rankings in the previous season is now directly given the first overall pick.

== Draft ==
PG	Point guard	SG	Shooting guard	SF	Small forward	PF	Power forward	C	Center	*	Mythical team member	^{#}	All-Star

=== 1st round ===
Round	Pick	Player	Pos.	Country of birth*	Team	PBA D-League team	College
1	1	* Stanley Pringle	SG/PG	United States	GlobalPort Batang Pier	none	Penn State
1	2	# Kevin Alas	PG/SG	Philippines	Rain or Shine Elasto Painters (from Meralco)^{[a]}	NLEX (D-League)	Letran
1	3	Ronald Pascual	SF	Philippines	Barako Bull Energy (traded to San Miguel)^{[A]}	NLEX (D-League)	San Sebastian
1	4	Matt Ganuelas-Rosser	SF	Philippines	NLEX Road Warriors	NLEX (D-League)	Cal Poly
1	5	# Chris Banchero	PG/SG	United States	Alaska Aces	Boracay Rum Waves	Seattle Pacific
1	6	Rodney Brondial	PF	Philippines	Barangay Ginebra San Miguel	Big Chill Super Chargers	Adamson
1	7	Anthony Semerad	SF/PF	Australia	San Mig Super Coffee Mixers (from San Miguel via Barako Bull^{[b]}, traded to GlobalPort)^{[B]}	Zambales M-Builders	San Beda
1	8	Jake Pascual	C/PF	Philippines	Barako Bull Energy (from Talk 'N Text)^{[c]}	NLEX (D-League)	San Beda
1	9	# Jericho Cruz	SG	Philippines	Rain or Shine Elasto Painters	Zambales M-Builders	Adamson
1	10	David Semerad	C/PF	Australia	Barako Bull Energy (from San Mig Super Coffee)^{[d]}	Zambales M-Builders	San Beda
1	11	Manny Pacquiao	PG	Philippines	Kia Sorento	none	NDDU
1	12	# Juami Tiongson	PG	Philippines	Blackwater Elite	Blackwater (D-League)	Ateneo

=== 2nd round ===
Round	Pick	Player	Pos.	Country of birth*	Team	PBA D-League team	College
2	1	Rome dela Rosa	SF	Philippines	Alaska Aces (from Meralco)^{[e]}	NLEX (D-League)	San Beda
2	2	Kevin Espinosa	SG/SF	Philippines	Rain or Shine Elasto Painters (from GlobalPort)^{[f]}	none	Mapua
2	3	Philip Paredes	C/PF	Philippines	Barako Bull Energy	Cebuana Lhuillier Gems	De La Salle
2	4	Junjun Alas	PF/C	Philippines	Alaska Aces (from NLEX)^{[g]}	Café France Bakers	Letran
2	5	Prince Caperal	C/PF	Philippines	GlobalPort Batang Pier (from Alaska)^{[h]}	Boracay Rum Waves	Arellano
2	6	Phillip Morrison	SG	United States	Barako Bull Energy (from Ginebra)^{[i]}	none	Asbury
2	7	# John Pinto	PG/SG	Philippines	GlobalPort Batang Pier (from San Miguel via Barako Bull^{[j]} and Alaska)^{[h]}	Cagayan Valley Rising Suns	Arellano
2	8	Harold Arboleda	SF	Philippines	Talk 'N Text Tropang Texters	Jumbo Plastic Linoleum Giants	Perpetual
2	9	Mike Gamboa	PG	Philippines	Rain or Shine Elasto Painters	Junior Powerade Tigers	UP Diliman
2	10	Gab Banal	SF	Philippines	San Miguel Beermen (from San Mig Super Coffee via Barako Bull,^{[k]} traded to Barako Bull)^{[A]}	Cebuana Lhuillier Gems	Mapua
2	11	Frank Golla	C/PF	Philippines	Blackwater Elite	none	Ateneo
2	12	Kyle Pascual	C/PF	Philippines	Kia Sorento	NLEX (D-League)	San Beda

=== 3rd round ===
Starting the third round, only Kia and Blackwater are allowed to draft players.

Round	Pick	Player	Pos.	Country of birth*	Team	PBA D-League team	College
3	1	Rene Pacquiao	PF	Philippines	Kia Sorento	Hog's Breath Razorbacks	SWU
3	2	Brian Heruela	PG/SG	Philippines	Blackwater Elite	Big Chill Super Chargers	UC
3	3	Maclean Sabellina	PF	Philippines	Blackwater Elite	Boracay Rum Waves	STI
3	4	Kenneth Ighalo	SF	Philippines	Kia Sorento	Cagayan Valley Rising Suns	Mapua
3	5	Paolo Taha	SG/SF	Philippines	Kia Sorento	Boracay Rum Waves	CSB
3	6	Juneric Baloria	SG	Philippines	Blackwater Elite	Big Chill Super Chargers	Perpetual
3	7	Raul Soyud	C	Philippines	Blackwater Elite	Blackwater (D-League)	UP Diliman
3	8	Jeremy Bartolo	PF	Philippines	Kia Sorento	none	Cal State San Bernardino
3	9	Anthony Gavieres	SG/SF	Philippines	Kia Sorento	none	VCU
3	10	Clark Bautista	SG	Philippines	Blackwater Elite	Blackwater (D-League)	UST
3	11	Ford Ruaya	PF	Philippines	Blackwater Elite	Hog's Breath Razorbacks	Letran
3	12	Richard Cole	SF	United States	Kia Sorento	none	NU
3	13	Giorgio Umali	SG/SF	Philippines	Kia Sorento	none	Seattle Pacific

=== 4th round ===
Round	Pick	Player	Pos.	Country of birth*	Team	PBA D-League team	College
4	1	Jonathan Banal	PG	Philippines	Kia Sorento	Wang's Basketball Couriers	Mapua
4	2	Michael Acuña	SF	Philippines	Kia Sorento	none	Perpetual
4	3	Mark Andrei Romero	SF	Philippines	Kia Sorento	Jumbo Plastic Linoleum Giants	CSB
4	4	Francis Bercede	PG	Philippines	Kia Sorento	none	USC

== Trades involving draft picks ==
=== Pre-draft trades ===
- ^{a} On June 28, 2012, Rain or Shine acquired a 2014 first round pick from Meralco in exchange for Ronjay Buenafe.
- ^{b} On January 22, 2013, in a three-team trade, San Miguel (as Petron) acquired Ronald Tubid from Barako Bull, the Energy acquired Alex Mallari, Jojo Duncil and a 2014 first round pick from Petron and JC Intal, Jonas Villanueva and Aldrech Ramos from San Mig Coffee, and the Mixers acquired Leo Najorda, Lester Alvarez, Mallari and the draft pick from the Energy.
- ^{c} On October 12, 2009, in a three-team trade, Barako Bull (as Burger King) acquired 2012 and 2013 first round pick from Talk 'N Text, and 2010 and 2012 first round picks from Barako Energy Coffee via the Tropang Texters; the Coffee Masters acquired Orlando Daroya from the Tropang Texters; and the Tropang Texters acquired Japeth Aguilar from the Whoppers. The Coffee Masters franchise was later sold, first to become the Shopinas.com Clickers/Air21 Express and then it was sold again to become the NLEX Road Warriors.
- ^{d} On September 3, 2010, Barako Bull (as Air21) acquired a 2014 first round pick from San Mig Coffee (as B-Meg) in a three-team trade with San Miguel.
- ^{e} On August 28, 2011, Alaska acquired a 2014 second round pick from Meralco in exchange for the draft rights to 17th pick Gilbert Bulawan.
- ^{f} On August 26, 2011, Rain or Shine acquired J.R. Quiñahan, Norman Gonzales, and 2013 and 2014 second round picks from Powerade in exchange for Doug Kramer and Josh Vanlandingham. The Tigers franchise was later sold to GlobalPort and became the Batang Pier.
- ^{g} On September 20, 2012, Alaska acquired a second round pick from Air21 in exchange for Bonbon Custodio. (The Express franchise was later sold to NLEX.)
- ^{h} On August 11, 2014, Alaska acquired Eric Menk from GlobalPort Batang Pier in exchange for two second round picks.
- ^{i} On January 27, 2012, in a three-team trade, Barako Bull acquired a 2014 second round pick, Ronald Tubid and Reil Cervantes from Barangay Ginebra, San Mig Super Coffee (as B-Meg) acquired JC Intal and a second round pick from the Energy, and Ginebra acquired Kerby Raymundo from the Llamados and Dylan Ababou from the Energy.
- ^{j}
- ^{k}

=== Draft-day trades ===
- ^{A1} ^{2} San Miguel acquired the draft rights to third pick Ronald Pascual from Barako Bull in exchange for Jojo Duncil, Chico Lañete, the draft rights to 22nd pick Gab Banal and a 2016 first round pick. San Miguel previously did not have a first round pick in this draft prior to the trade.
- ^{B} GlobalPort acquired the draft rights to seventh pick Anthony Semerad and a 2016 first round pick from San Mig Coffee in exchange for a 2016 first round pick and a 2018 second round pick.

== Undrafted players ==
Name	Country of birth	College	Notes
Jeffrey Acain	Philippines	De La Salle-Dasmariñas	
Rocky Acidre	Philippines	Arellano	
Raymond Alcasabas	Philippines	San Sebastian	
George Allen	Philippines	Perpetual	
Julius Atienza	Philippines	FEU	
Andrew Avillanoza	United States	Central Florida	
Mervin Baloran	Philippines	National U	
Jerald Bautista	Philippines	STI	
Jonathan Belorio	Philippines	Letran	
Mark Berry	Philippines	National U	
Franklin Bonifacio	United States	Las Positas	
Roider Cabrera	Philippines	Adamson	
Lord Casajeros	Philippines	UE	
Jackson Corpuz	Philippines	PCU	
Jamieson Cortes	Philippines	Letran	
Franz Delgado	Philippines	San Sebastian	
Lester Dickens	Philippines	Olivarez	
Alwin Elinon	Philippines	RTU	
Erwin Estole	Philippines	San Sebastian	
Amante Flores	Philippines	UM	
Hazel Foja	Philippines	Manila Adventist	
John Julien Foronda	Philippines	Letran	
Marlon Gomez	Philippines	PCU	
Vincent Importante	Philippines	Adamson	
Dexter Maiquez	Philippines	San Sebastian	
Mark Mendoza	Philippines	Dr La Salle	
Gryann Mendoza	Philippines	FEU	
Jeff Montemayor	Philippines	JRU	
John Montemayor	Philippines	JRU	
Jefferson Morillo	Philippines	TIP	
Ralf Olivares	Philippines	UE	
Paolo Orbeta	Philippines	Benilde	
Philip Paniamogan	Philippines	JRU	
Edmar Pateño	Philippines	UM	
Justin Perlas	Philippines	Asian Summit College	
Earnest Efren Reyes	Philippines	Bulacan State	
Renato Robrigado	Philippines	(New Zealand) WelTec	
Allan Santos	Philippines	Adamson	
Jonathan Semira	Canada	San Sebastian	
JM Sicat	Philippines	Perpetual	
Daryle Tan	Philippines	Triton College	
Cody Tesoro	United States	Western Oregon	
Allan Tria	Philippines	TUP	
Jeff Viernes	Philippines	St. Clare College	
Mar Villahermosa	Philippines	San Beda	
Russel Yaya	Philippines	EAC	
