= Philip Paniamogan =

Filipino basketball player

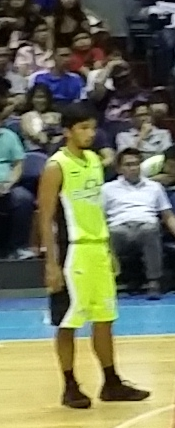
- Paniamogan in 2015

Personal information
- Born: May 30, 1991 (age 35) Cagayan de Oro, Philippines
- Listed height: 6 ft 0 in (1.83 m)
- Listed weight: 180 lb (82 kg)

Career information
- College: JRU
- PBA draft: 2014: Undrafted
- Playing career: 2015–present
- Position: Point guard / shooting guard

Career history
- 2015–2016: GlobalPort Batang Pier
- 2016–2018: Mahindra Enforcer / Mahindra Floodbuster / Kia Picanto
- 2018: Makati Skyscrapers
- 2018–2023: NLEX Road Warriors
- 2024–2025: Batangas City Tanduay Rum Masters

Phillip Criszam Jabar Paniamogan (born May 30, 1991) is a Filipino professional basketball player for the Batangas City Tanduay Rum Masters of the Maharlika Pilipinas Basketball League (MPBL).

Paniamogan played college basketball for José Rizal University (JRU) Heavy Bombers. In 2014, he entered the 2014 PBA draft but was left undrafted. Despite that, a year later, he made his Philippine Basketball Association debut after signing a deal with the GlobalPort Batang Pier. He only played there for one conference, after which he moved to the Mahindra Enforcer. After a brief stint with the Makati Skyscrapers of the Maharlika Pilipinas Basketball League, he then returned to the PBA with the NLEX Road Warriors.

In 2024, he returned to the MPBL with the Batangas City Tanduay Rum Masters, where he set a record for three-point field goals made in a game in 2025.

== Career ==
=== College career ===
Paniamogan played for the JRU Heavy Bombers in both the National Collegiate Athletic Association and the PBA D-League. He helped JRU reach the finals of the 2012 PBA D-League Aspirants' Cup. Paniamogan entered the 2014 PBA draft, but ended up getting undrafted, and thus continued playing for JRU.

=== GlobalPort Batang Pier (2015–2016) ===
In 2015, Paniamogan joined the GlobalPort Batang Pier; not in the Philippine Basketball Association but rather in the Manny Pacquiao Cup, a pocket tournament that took place in General Santos. After winning MVP in the tournament, Paniamogan was given the chance to play in the PBA with GlobalPort in September that year.

=== Mahindra/Kia franchise (2016–2018) ===
In February 2016, Paniamogan then moved to the Mahindra Enforcer. Though he only played nine games in the 2015–16 season before gaining a bigger role the following season. In 33 games of the 2016–17 season, Paniamogan averaged 6.5 points, 1.8 rebounds, and 1.4 assists.

=== NLEX Road Warriors (2018–2023) ===
In 2018, Paniamogan had a short stint in the amateur ranks, playing for the Makati Skyscrapers of the Maharlika Pilipinas Basketball League, but it didn't take him long before going back to the PBA. In September 2018, he signed with the NLEX Road Warriors, where he stayed for the next four seasons. He had his best statistical season in 2019 where he averaged 7.5 points, 2.7 rebounds, and 2.3 assists per game.

=== Batangas City Tanduay Rum Masters (2024–present) ===
In 2024, Paniamogan went back to the MPBL, this time with the Batangas City Tanduay Rum Masters. On June 12, 2025, he made an MPBL record fifteen three-point field goals in a game against the Cebu Classic.

== Career statistics ==
=== PBA ===
Legend
GP	Games played	MPG	Minutes per game
FG%	Field-goal percentage	3P%	3-point field-goal percentage	FT%	Free-throw percentage
RPG	Rebounds per game	APG	Assists per game	SPG	Steals per game
BPG	Blocks per game	PPG	Points per game	**Bold**	Career high

As of the end of 2022–23 season

==== Season-by-season averages ====
Year	Team	GP	MPG	FG%	3P%	FT%	RPG	APG	SPG	BPG	PPG
2015–16	GlobalPort	9	5.8	.231	.111	**1.000**	.9	.8	.2	.0	1.9
2015–16	Mahindra	9	5.8	.231	.111	**1.000**	.9	.8	.2	.0	1.9
2016–17	Mahindra / Kia	33	16.3	.379	.313	.725	1.8	1.4	.5	.0	6.5
2017–18	Kia	16	15.8	.400	.308	.765	1.6	1.6	**1.0**	**.3**	6.6
2017–18	NLEX	16	15.8	.400	.308	.765	1.6	1.6	**1.0**	**.3**	6.6
2019	NLEX	**35**	**18.3**	**.438**	**.408**	.870	**2.7**	**2.3**	.6	.1	**7.5**
2020	NLEX	6	10.6	.280	.182	—	1.5	1.2	.2	.0	2.7
2021	NLEX	26	13.7	.310	.287	.750	1.5	1.0	.7	.1	4.5
2022–23	NLEX	17	10.4	.338	.300	**1.000**	1.8	1.0	.5	.1	4.1
Career		142	14.7	.374	.323	.790	1.9	1.5	.6	.1	5.6
