= 2012 PBA D-League Foundation Cup =

- Duration: March - June 2012
- TV partner(s): Sports5; IBC

Finals
- Champions: NLEX Road Warriors
- Runners-up: Big Chill Super Chargers

PBA D-League Foundation Cup chronology
- < 2011 2013 >

The 2012 PBA D-League Foundation Cup is the second conference of the 2011-12 PBA D-League season. It is composed of 10 teams including the debut of Erase Plantcenta Erasers and Cagayan Rising Suns and the readmission of Junior Powerade Tigers as Freego Jeans Makers. The PC Gilmore Wizards, Cobra Energy Drink Iron Men and Dub Unlimited Wheelers are disbanded.

== Eliminations ==
=== Standings ===
The table below shows the standings of each team at the end of elimination round:

Position	Team	Win	Loss	Percentage	Tiebreaker	Qualification
1	NLEX Road Warriors	9	0	1.000	—	Outright semifinals
2	Big Chill Super Chargers	7	2	.777	+16	Outright semifinals
3	Cebuana Lhuillier Gems	7	2	.777	−16	Twice-to-beat in the quarterfinals
4	Blackwater Elite	6	3	.667	—	Twice-to-beat in the quarterfinals
5	RnW Pacific Pipes Steelmasters	4	5	.444	—	Twice-to-win in the quarterfinals
6	Cafefrance Bakers	3	6	.333	+27	Twice-to-win in the quarterfinals
7	Boracay Rum Waves	3	6	.333	+3	Eliminated
8	Erase Plantcenta Erasers	3	6	.333	−7	Eliminated
9	Junior Powerade Tigers	3	6	.333	−29	Eliminated
10	Cagayan Rising Suns	0	9	.000	—	Eliminated

== Bracket ==
Quarterfinals
3rd seed has 2x-to-beat advantage
3	Cebuana Lhuillier	82	—	—
6	Cafe France	77	—	—
4th seed has 2x-to-beat advantage
4	Blackwater Elite	76	—	—
5	RnW Pacific Pipes	69	—	—

Semifinals (best-of-3 series)
2	Big Chill	66	111	83
3	Cebuana Lhuillier	79	79	80
1	NLEX	86	82	—
4	Blackwater Elite	77	72	—

D-League Finals (best-of-3 series)
2	Big Chill	71	62	—
1	NLEX	86	82	—
