= 2016 PBA D-League Foundation Cup =

The 2016 PBA-D-League Foundation Cup is the second conference of the 2015-16 PBA Developmental League season. Seven (7) teams including new team Blustar Detergent Dragons composed of the Westports Malaysia Dragons players will be compete in the two-month conference that will start on June 2, 2016, at the Ynares Sports Arena, Pasig. The games will be aired on AksyonTV, Hyper and Sports5.ph.

== Teams ==
PBA Development League current teams
Team	Company	Colors	Joined D-League	PBA Affiliate	Titles	Head coach
Tanduay Light Rhum Masters	Tanduay Distillers Inc.	Gold, White and Red	2011	none	0	Lawrence Chongson
Cafe France Bakers - Centro Escolar University	CaféFrance Corporation	Blue, White and Red	2011	Rain or Shine Elasto Painters	1	Edgar Macaraya
Racal Tile Masters	Racal Group of Companies	Red and White	2014	Meralco Bolts	0	Caloy Garcia
AMA Online Education Titans	AMA Computer University	Crimson Red and White	2014	none	0	Mark Herrera
Blustar Detergent Dragons	Ever Bilena Cosmetics, Inc.	Red and White	2016	Blackwater Elite	0	Goh Cheng Huat
Topstar Z.C. Mindanao Aguilas	Kings Janitorial Services and Cooperative of Zamboanga	Orange and White	2016	GlobalPort Batang Pier	0	Jade Marvin Padrigao
Phoenix Petroleum Accelerators	Phoenix Petroleum Philippines, Inc.	Green and Gold	2016	Phoenix Fuel Masters	1	Eric Gonzales

== Format ==
Conference format as it follows:

- All seven teams will play in a double round-robin elimination phase.
- Top 4 teams of the elimination round will advanced in the semifinals round.
- In case of ties in the elimination round standings, it will be broken via the quotient system.
- Top 2 teams will get a twice-to-beat semifinals incentives.
- The two teams who won the semifinals matches will battle in a best-of-3 finals series.

== Eliminations ==
Eliminations matches will be held at the Ynares Sports Arena, Pasig and the JCSGO Gym, Quezon City. The league also had an out-of-town game held on June 23, 2016, at the Strike Gym, Bacoor, Cavite.

=== Standings ===
These are the team standings at the end of the elimination round:

Team	Win	Loss	PCT	Qualification
Racal Tile Masters	10	2	.875	Twice-to-beat advantage in the semifinals
Phoenix Petroleum Accelerators-FEU	9	3	.750	Twice-to-beat advantage in the semifinals
Cafefrance Bakers-CEU	9	3	.750	Twice-to-win disadvantage in the semifinals
Tanduay Rhum Masters	8	4	.667	Twice-to-win disadvantage in the semifinals
AMA Online Education Titans	4	8	.333	Eliminated
Blustar Detergent Dragons	2	10	.167	Eliminated
Topstar Z.C. Mindanao Aguilas	0	12	.000	Eliminated

=== Schedule ===
	Round 1						Round 2					
Team ╲ Game	1	2	3	4	5	6	7	8	9	10	11	12
AMA	TAN	RCL	PNX	CFE	BLU	PNX	TSR	BLU	CFE			
Blustar Detergent	TAN	CFE	PNX	RCL	TSR	AMA	TAN	CFE	RCL	AMA	BLU	
Café France-CEU	TSR	RCL	BLU	TAN	AMA	RCL	BLU	PNX	TAN	AMA		
Phoenix-FEU	TAN	TSR	AMA	BLU	TSR	RCL	TAN	AMA	CFE	RCL		
Racal	AMA	CFE	TSR	BLU	TAN	CFE	PNX	TSR	BLU	PNX	TAN	
Tanduay	AMA	PNX	BLU	CFE	RCL	BLU	TSR	PNX	TSR	CFE	RCL	
Topstar Z.C. Mindanao	CFE	PNX	RCL	BLU	PNX	TAN	RCL	TAN	AMA	BLU		

= Win; = OT win; = Loss; = OT loss

=== Results ===
Team	AMA	BLU	CAF	PHO	RAC	TAN	TOP
AMA		81–78	86–70	89–97	67–100	66–72	109–84
Blustar Detergent	84–113		83–98	94–97	60–122	71–94	89–75
Café France-CEU	92–86	90–61		96–93	83–79	80–84	89–64
Phoenix-FEU	109–70				78–93	98–79	108–78
Racal		90–83	72–78	90–88		96–90	102–83
Tanduay		105–102	75–74	95–108	81–90		84–81
Topstar Z.C. Mindanao		93–98		77–126	65–124	78–133	

Legend: Blue = left column team win; Red = top row team win.
Matches with lighter background shading were decided after overtime.

== Playoffs ==
Semifinals (Nos. 1 & 2 have twice-to-beat advantage)
1	Racal Tile Masters	86	70
4	Tanduay Rhum Masters	88	81
2	Phoenix-FEU	68	89
3	Cafefrance-CEU	78	78

Finals (Best-of-three series)
4	Tanduay Rhum Masters	76	89	78
2	Phoenix-FEU Accelerators	84	75	87

== Semifinals ==
=== Racal vs. Tanduay ===
AksyonTV

August 11
4:00 pm

Report

Tanduay Rhum Masters	88–86	Racal Tile Masters
Scoring by quarter: 22–22, 33–21, 17–20, 16–23
Pts: Alolino 26; Rebs: Celda 8 Asts: Celda 6		Pts: Grey 21; Rebs: Grey 6 Asts: Grey 4

Strike Gym, Bacoor, Cavite

AksyonTV

August 15
7:00 pm

Report

Racal Tile Masters	70–81	Tanduay Rhum Masters
Scoring by quarter: 13–15, 25–16, 16–28, 16–32
Pts: Ortuoste 16		Pts: Celda 21; Rebs: Celda 8 Asts: Alolino, Celda 4 each
Tanduay wins series, 2–0

Strike Gym, Bacoor, Cavite

=== Phoenix vs. Cafefrance series ===
AksyonTV

August 10
6:00 pm

Report

Phoenix-FEU Accelerators 68, Cafefrance-CEU Bakers 78
Scoring by quarter: 16-12, 18-17, 18-26, 16-23
Pts: Belo 23; Rebs: Belo 11; Asts: Tolomia 3 Steals: Tolomia 2	Pts: Ebondo 19; Rebs: Ebondo 18; Blocks: Ebondo 2

Strike Gym, Bacoor, Cavite

AksyonTV

August 16

Report

Cafefrance-CEU Bakers 78, Phoenix-FEU Accelerators 89
Pts: Ebondo 25; Rebs: Ebondo 19	Pts: Tolomia 31; Rebs: Belo 14; Asts: Tolomia 4
Phoenix wins series in two games

Strike Gym, Bacoor, Cavite
