= 2014 PBA D-League Foundation Cup =

2014 PBA PBA D-League Foundation Cup
- TV partner(s): Sports5; IBC

Finals
- Champions: NLEX Road Warriors (PBA D-League)
- Runners-up: Blackwater Sports (PBA D-League)

PBA PBA D-League Foundation Cup chronology
- < 2013 2015 >

The 2014 PBA D-League Foundation Cup is the second conference of the 2013-14 PBA Developmental League season.

== Awards ==
2014 PBA D-League Foundation Cup Champions
NLEX Road Warriors
Sixth title
