= James Forrester (basketball) =

Filipino-Canadian basketball player

Personal information
- Born: September 3, 1989 (age 37) Toronto, Ontario, Canada
- Listed height: 6 ft 2 in (1.88 m)
- Listed weight: 190 lb (86 kg)

Career information
- High school: IMG Academy (Bradenton, Florida)
- College: Arellano
- PBA draft: 2013: 1st round, 4th overall pick
- Drafted by: Barako Bull Energy Cola
- Playing career: 2013–2020
- Position: Shooting guard / small forward

Career history
- 2013–2015: Barangay Ginebra San Miguel
- 2015–2016: Barako Bull Energy
- 2016: Phoenix Fuel Masters
- 2016: NLEX Road Warriors
- 2016–2017: Blackwater Elite
- 2017: GlobalPort Batang Pier
- 2017: Formosa Dreamers
- 2019–2020: Davao Occidental Tigers

James Patrick Forrester (born September 3, 1989) is a Filipino-Canadian former professional basketball player. He was selected 4th overall in the 2013 PBA draft by Barako Bull.

== Amateur career ==
Before beginning his college career at Arellano University, Forrester trained at IMG Academy Prep for one year in the United States. During his one-year stay at IMG Academy Prep, Forrester averaged 15.7 points, 3.7 rebounds, 6.0 assists and 2.3 steals per game. Despite being offered a full scholarship to attend and play basketball at the Ateneo De Manila University, Forrester opted to play for the Arellano Chiefs instead.

=== College career ===
Forrester had a brief tenure at Arellano University that lasted only 2 seasons due to his maximum eligibility of 2 years. Unfortunately, his whole college career was filled with inconsistent play and a struggle throughout his whole second season after suffering an injury in preseason play and still continuing to play despite the severity of the injury.

==== Rookie season ====
Forrester joined the Arellano Chiefs in 2012 for the NCAA Season 88 basketball tournament. Forrester's debut performance was against the JRU Heavy Bombers in the Chiefs' third game of the season wherein Forrest tallied 7 points and 5 rebounds in 22 minutes of playing time. In his rookie season, Forrester was a consistent member of the starting lineup for the Chiefs at the small forward position. Forrester scored a career high 28 points in a loss against the San Beda Red Lions, he made 7 three-pointers and grabbed 7 rebounds in 23 minutes of playing time. The Chiefs finished the season with a disappointing win–loss record of 6 wins and 12 losses in which they failed to qualify for the Final Four. Forrester's rookie season had him play 16 games and averaged 23.94 minutes, 12.25 points, 5.06 rebounds and 1.25 steals per game.

==== Second season ====
After completing a successful rookie campaign statistically, Forrester was given the honour of being the Chiefs' team captain. However, his final season was filled with inconsistency and a lingering injury that occurred just before the start of NCAA Season 89. The injury he experienced was a meniscal tear in his left knee during a game against Jose Rizal University where he still led the Chiefs with 21 points en route to victory. Even though he was injured, Forrester still played but his average numbers took a drop wherein he averaged 8.4 points, 3.4 rebounds, and 0.9 steals per game in his final season. Overall, the Chiefs' Season 89 campaign ended with no Final Four berth once again and an 8 win-10 loss record. Upon season's end, Forrester graduated from Arellano University and elected to join the 2013 PBA Draft.

=== PBA D-League ===
Forrester played for the Cagayan Rising Suns for a short period of time and averaged 12.5 points and 5.1 rebounds per game while shooting an average of 37% from beyond the arc during his tenure.

== Professional basketball career ==
=== PBA draft ===
Entering the 2013 PBA draft, Forrester was projected to be a mid-late first-round draft pick. He was eventually selected 4th overall in the 2013 PBA draft by Barako Bull Energy but his draft rights were then traded for by Barangay Ginebra San Miguel. Based on scouting reports, Forrester was described as an athletic wing player with incredible leaping ability and explosiveness which led to his nickname of "Air Canada".

=== Barangay Ginebra San Miguel (2013–2015) ===
Having played in 10 games for Barangay Ginebra San Miguel, Forrester averaged 5.3 minutes, 1.3 points, 1.2 rebounds and 0.2 steals per game. Forrester plays both the guard and forward positions, and plays alongside Greg Slaughter, the 2013 PBA Draft number 1 draft pick.

=== Barako Bull Energy (2015–2016) ===
On March 31, 2015, Forrester, along with Dylan Ababou was traded to Barako Bull Energy in exchange for Barako Bull's first-round pick in the 2015 PBA draft (later turned out be Scottie Thompson.

=== NLEX Road Warriors (2016) ===
On May 31, 2016, Forrester was traded to NLEX for John Wilson.

=== Blackwater Elite (2016-2017) ===
On October 26, 2016, Forrester was traded, along with a 2016 second-round pick to the Blackwater Elite in exchange for Carlo Lastimosa.

=== GlobalPort Batang Pier (2017) ===
On March 29, Forrester was traded, along with Dylan Ababou to the GlobalPort Batang Pier in exchange for KG Canaleta.

== PBA career statistics ==
Legend
GP	Games played	MPG	Minutes per game
FG%	Field-goal percentage	3P%	3-point field-goal percentage	FT%	Free-throw percentage
RPG	Rebounds per game	APG	Assists per game	SPG	Steals per game
BPG	Blocks per game	PPG	Points per game	**Bold**	Career high

Correct as of September 23, 2016

=== Season-by-season averages ===
Year	Team	GP	MPG	FG%	3P%	FT%	RPG	APG	SPG	BPG	PPG
2013–14	Barangay Ginebra	**10**	5.3	.235	.000	.556	**1.2**	.2	.2	**.2**	1.3
2014–15	Barangay Ginebra	**10**	**7.3**	.222	**.375**	.600	1.0	**.8**	**.5**	.0	**1.4**
2015–16	Barako Bull / Phoenix / NLEX	9	5.6	**.333**	.143	**1.000**	.4	.2	.0	.1	**1.4**
Career		29	6.1	.255	.190	.667	.9	.4	.2	.1	1.4

== Personal life ==
Born and raised in Toronto, Ontario, Canada, Forrester's Filipino heritage came from his mother, Leticia Parinas, who is from Pangasinan.
