= 2016 PBA D-League Aspirants' Cup =

Philippine developmental basketball tournament

2016 PBA D-League Aspirant's Cup
- The 5th PBA Aspirant's Cup
- Duration: January 21-April 14, 2016
- Number of teams: 9

Finals
- Champions: Phoenix-FEU Accelerators
- Runners-up: Cafefrance-CEU Bakers

Awards
- Best Player: Mac Belo
- Finals MVP: Mac Belo

PBA D-League Aspirant's Cup chronology
- < 2015 2017 >

The 2016 PBA D-League Aspirants Cup was the first conference of the 2015-16 PBA Developmental League season. It was opened on January 21, 2016 at the Filoil Flying V Center and competed by 9 teams and it was finished on April 14, 2016 where the Phoenix-FEU Accelerators defeated the Cafefrance Bakers-CEU in the best-of-5 finals showdown, 3 games to 2 and clinching their first ever title in their franchise.

== Draft ==
The draft was conducted on December 1, 2015 at the PBA Cafe in Pasig. 215 hopefuls were applied in the draft for the chance to play in the league.

Draft Order:

First Round

- 1.) Jason Perkins (Racal/Keramix - DLSU)
- 2.) Julian Sargent (AMA University - DLSU)
- 3.) Von Pessumal (Tanduay Light - Ateneo)
- 4.) Taylor Statham (Cafe France)
- 5.) Avery Scharer (Wang's Basketball - Shoreline CC)
- 6.) Mikey Williams (Mindanao Aguilas - Cal State U)
- 7.) Agustini Amar (Jam Liner - UP)
- 8.) Richard Escoto (Phoenix Petroleum - FEU)
- 9.) BDO-NU - Passed

Second Round

- 1.) Jordan Rios (Racal/Keramix - St. Clare)
- 2.) Ryan Pascual (AMA University - Cal State-Long Beach)
- 3.) Alfonso Gotladera (Tanduay Light - Ateneo)
- 4.) John Karl Casiño (Cafe France - CEU)
- 5.) Anton Castro (Wang's Basketball - Adamson)
- 6.) Taylor Wetherell (Mindanao Aguilas)
- 7.) Alfrancis Tamsi (Phoenix Petroleum - FEU)
- 8.) Jam Liner - Passed
- 9.) BDO-NU - Passed

== Format ==
Conference format as it follows:

- Teams will play in a single round-robin elimination round.
- Top 8 teams will advance to the quarterfinals while the 9th placer team will be eliminated.
- Top 4 teams will get a twice-to-beat quarterfinals incentive against lower-ranked teams to determine the semifinals placings. Semifinals is a best-of-three affair.
- The two teams who won the semifinals matches will battle in a best-of-5 championship series.

== Eliminations ==
The elimination round will run from January 21 to March 7, 2016. Games will be held in Filoil Flying V Arena, San Juan and Ynares Sports Arena, Pasig.

=== Team standings ===
Team standing at the end of the elimination round:

Pos	Team	W	L	PCT	GB	Qualification
1	Cafefrance-CEU	7	1	.875	—	Twice-to-beat in the quarter-finals
2	Caida Tile Masters	7	1	.875	—	Twice-to-beat in the quarter-finals
3	UP-QRS Jam Liner	5	3	.625	2	Twice-to-beat in the quarter-finals
4	Phoenix Petroleum-FEU	5	3	.625	2	Twice-to-beat in the quarter-finals
5	Tanduay Rhum Light Masters	5	3	.625	2	Twice-to-win in the quarter-finals
6	AMA University Titans	2	6	.250	5	Twice-to-win in the quarter-finals
7	BDO-NU	2	6	.250	5	Twice-to-win in the quarter-finals
8	Wangs Basketball	1	7	.125	6	Twice-to-win in the quarter-finals
9	Mindanao Aguilas	1	7	.125	6	Eliminated

Source: PBA D-League Archives
Rules for classification: a.) Head-to-head record, b.) Winning percentage c.)If necessary, use the quotient system.

=== Schedule ===
Team ╲ Game	1	2	3	4	5	6	7	8
AMA Online Education	CAI	PNX	BDO	TAN	WNG	MIN	CFE	JAM
BDO — NU Bulldogs	JAM	CFE	AMA	MIN	PNX	WNG	TAN	CAI
Café France Bakers — CEU	MIN	BDO	JAM	CAI	WNG	TAN	AMA	PNX
Caida Tile Masters	TAN	AMA	WNG	CFE	PNX	JAM	MIN	BDO
Z.C. Mindanao Aguilas	CFE	WNG	TAN	JAM	BDO	AMA	CAI	PNX
Phoenix Petroleum Accelerators — FEU Tamaraws	WNG	AMA	JAM	CAI	BDO	TAN	CFE	MIN
QRS/JAM Liner — UP Fighting Maroons	BDO	TAN	CFE	PNX	MIN	CAI	WNG	AMA
Tanduay Light Rhum Masters	CAI	JAM	MIN	WNG	AMA	CFE	BDO	PNX
Wang's Basketball	PNX	MIN	CAI	TAN	CFE	AMA	JAM	BDO

= Win; = OT win; = Loss; = OT loss

=== Results ===
Team	AMA	BDO	CAF	CAI	JAM	MIN	PHO	TAN	WAN
AMA		87–93	78–97	103–84	100–84	91–85	102–114	92–83	97–90
BDO			86–110	68–89	85–90	67–73	74–90	81–83	106–97
Caféfrance				90–87	94–73	89–65	83–74	74–79	106–73
Caida					118–86	95–87	108–91	90–79	110–106
JAM						100–75	98–84	102–86	80–69
Mindanao							80–90	56–95	97–88
Phoenix Petroleum								85–80	107–70
Tanduay									90–75
Wang's									

Legend: Blue = left column team win; Red = top row team win.
Matches with lighter background shading were decided after overtime.

== Playoffs ==
Quarterfinals (Higher seeds have twice-to-beat)
1	Cafefrance-CEU	90
8	Wang's Basketball	72
3	UP-QRS/Jam Liner	66	89
5	Tanduay Rhum Masters	68	99
2	Caida Tile Masters	122
6	AMA University Titans	97
4	Phoenix-FEU Accelerators	92
7	BDO-NU Bulldogs	72

Semifinals (best-of-3 series)
1	Cafefrance-CEU	2
5	Tanduay Rhum Masters	0
2	Caida Tile Masters	0
4	Phoenix-FEU	2

Finals (best-of-5 series)
1	Cafefrance-CEU	2
4	Phoenix-FEU	3

=== Quarterfinals ===
AksyonTV

March 10
14:00

Report

Café France-CEU Bakers	90–72	Wang's Basketball
Scoring by quarter: 26–9, 25–22, 22–20, 17–21
Pts: de Leon 15		Pts: Romero 12

Ynares Sports Arena, Antipolo City

AksyonTV

March 10
16:00

Report

Tanduay Rhum Masters	68–66	UP QRS/Jam Liner
Scoring by quarter: 13–26, 10–13, 29–16, 16–11
Pts: Llagas 13		Pts: Aguilar 17

Ynares Sports Arena, Antipolo City

AksyonTV

March 17

UP QRS/Jam Liner	89–99	Tanduay Rhum Masters
Scoring by quarter: 21–28, 24–13, 11–25, 23–33
Pts: Alolino 24		Pts: Belencion 27
Tanduay wins series in two games

Ynares Sports Arena, Antipolo

AksyonTV

March 15
16:00

Report

Phoenix-FEU Accelerators	92–72	BDO-NU Team
Scoring by quarter: 21–22, 30–13, 21–21, 20–16
Pts: Tolomia 19; Rebs: Belo 12; Asts: Tolomia 6		Pts: Aroga 21; Rebs: Aroga 15; Asts: Aroga 6

San Juan Arena, San Juan, Metro Manila

AksyonTV

March 15
14:00

Caida Tile Masters	122–97	AMA University Titans
Scoring by quarter: 32–20, 19–27, 42–23, 29–27
Pts: Perkins 17; Rebs: Jalalon 4		Pts: McCarthy 20; Rebs: King 9

San Juan Arena, San Juan City

== Semifinals ==
This round is in a best-of-3 format. The winner advances to the finals.

=== CafeFrance vs. Tanduay series ===
AksyonTV

March 27

CafeFrance Bakers - CEU	65–58	Tanduay Light Rhum Masters
Scoring by quarter: 18-16, 14-12, 17-16, 16-14
Pts: Ebondo 14; Rebs: Ebondo 10		Pts: Llagas 13; Rebs: Cruz 5

San Juan Arena, San Juan, Metro Manila

AksyonTV

March 29
17:00

CafeFrance Bakers - CEU	72–63	Tanduay Light Rhum Masters
Scoring by quarter: 19-16, 24-12, 8-16, 21-19
Pts: De Leon, Ebondo 13 each Rebs: Abundo 7		Pts: Lingganay 17; Rebs: Lingganay 9
Cafefrance sweeps series, 2–0

San Juan Arena, San Juan, Metro Manila

=== Phoenix vs. Caida series ===
AksyonTV

March 22
14:00

Phoenix-FEU Accelerators	90–83	Caida Tile Masters
Pts: Daquioag 32; Rebs: Ru. Escoto 10		Pts: Grey 14; Rebs: Grey 4

San Juan Arena, San Juan, Metro Manila

AksyonTV

March 29
17:00

Caida Tile Masters	90–94	Phoenix-FEU Accelerators
Scoring by quarter: 28-26, 18-28, 26-15, 22-21
Pts: Grey 22		Pts: Daquioag 22
Phoenix sweeps series, 2–0

San Juan Arena, San Juan, Metro Manila

== Finals ==
AksyonTV

March 31

Cafefrance Bakers-CEU	78–82	Phoenix-FEU Accelerators
Scoring by quarter: 17-12, 24-17, 24-21, 17-28
Pts: Ebondo 16; Rebs: Ebondo 18		Pts: Pogoy 18; Rebs: Pogoy 9

Ynares Sports Arena, Antipolo

AksyonTV

April 5

Cafefrance Bakers-CEU	86–77	Phoenix-FEU Accelerators
Scoring by quarter: 20-23, 29-11, 20-17, 17-26
Pts: Cruz 18; Rebs: Ebondo 20		Pts: Belo 22; Rebs: Belo 9

San Juan Arena, San Juan, Metro Manila

AksyonTV

April 7

Phoenix-FEU Accelerators	85–84	Cafefrance Bakers-CEU
Scoring by quarter: 18-17, 17-20, 26-31, 24-16
Pts: Belo 22; Rebs: Pogoy 12; Asts: Pogoy 3		Pts: Ebondo 18; Rebs: Ebondo 18

Ynares Sports Arena, Antipolo

With only 2.3 seconds left in the final frame and the Bakers leading by 2, 84-82, Roger Pogoy made a game-winning 3 pointer where it was assisted by Achie Inigo to close the gap to an inch for winning the 2016 PBA Aspirant's Cup title.

AksyonTV

April 12

Cafefrance Bakers-CEU	100–94	Phoenix-FEU Accelerators
Scoring by quarter: 21–21, 26–23, 28–20, 25–30
Pts: Zamar 25; Rebs: Ebondo 13		Pts: Tolomia 29; Rebs: Belo 15

San Juan Arena, San Juan, Metro Manila

The Bakers led as much as 14, with a score of 82-68 in the final 6:47 of the game before the Mac Belo-led Phoenix-FEU drained down the lead to just a single point, 89-88 in the last 2:58 of the game. But Paul Zamar had answered the destruction to regain the six-point lead by the Bakers, 94-88 with 1:07 remaining.

AksyonTV

April 14
15:00

Cafefrance Bakers-CEU	81–88 (OT)	Phoenix-FEU Accelerators
Pts: Zamar 20; Rebs: Ebondo 20		Pts: Belo 25; Rebs: Belo 13
Phoenix wins series, 3–2

Ynares Sports Arena, Antipolo

Tolomia of the Phoenix-FEU started exchanging threes with Paul Zamar as the Accelerators clinch an 81-78 lead with 2:39 left, but Roger Pogoy joined the party by hitting his shot from the downtown to extend his team's lead to 6, 84-78 in the last 10 seconds before the 2-minute mark.

== Awards ==
2016 PBA D-League Aspirant's Cup Champions: Phoenix-FEU Accelerators (1st title)

Runners-up: Cafefrance Bakers-CEU

Finals MVP: Mac Belo (19.6 points/game)

Tournament Most Valuable Player:Mac Belo
