= 2017 PBA D-League Aspirants' Cup =

2017 PBA D-League Aspirant's Cup
- The 6th PBA Aspirant's Cup
- Duration: January 19, 2017—April 6, 2017
- TV partner(s): AksyonTV and Youtube (Livestreams)

Finals
- Champions: Cignal-San Beda
- Runners-up: Racal Ceramica

Awards
- Best Player: Robert Bolick

PBA D-League Aspirant's Cup chronology
- < 2016 2018 >

The 2017 PBA D-League Aspirants Cup is the first conference of the 2017 PBA Developmental League season. The tournament opened on January 19, 2017, at the Ynares Sports Arena, Pasig.

There are 10 teams in this season's Aspirant's Cup, 4 are holdovers from last year's Foundation Cup, 2 returnees after a short hiatus, and 3 new squads. 5 of the teams were represented by players from various colleges and universities.

== Draft ==
The annual draft of the PBA D-League will be conducted on December 20, 2016. 128 aspirants—113 local players and 15 Filipino-foreigners—had already submitted their intention to participate in the draft. AMA, Tanduay, Racal, Caféfrance and Wang's will picked the first five draft picks, while a lottery will decide the draft orders of 4 new teams, San Beda-Cignal, JRU, MLQU and Batangas. As a guest team, Blustar Malaysia will be ineligible to join the drafting proceedings. Jeron Teng of the De La Salle Green Archers was picked as the #1 draft pick by AMA Online Education.

Draft Order
1st Round:

1. AMA Online Education: Jeron Teng (DLSU)
2. Tanduay: Jom Sollano (Letran)
3. Racal: Junjun Gabriel (CDSL)
4. Cafefrance: Patrick Aquino (CEU)
5. Wang's: G-Boy Babilonia (Ateneo)
6. Victoria Sports-MLQU: Jayson Grimaldo (MLQU)
7. Cignal-San Beda: Davon Potts (San Beda)
8. Batangas: Wilmar Anderson (UB)
9. JRU: PASS
10. Blustar Malaysia: PASS

== Tournament Format ==
- Ten teams will play in a single round-robin elimination phase.
- Only the top six teams will only make it to the playoffs after the elimination round.
- #1 & #2 seeds will head straight to the semifinals, where #3-#6 seeds will undergo in the quarterfinals.
- The Semifinals and the Championship will both be contested in a best-of-3 series.

== Team Standings ==
| Pos | Team | W | L | PCT | GB | Qualification |
|---|---|---|---|---|---|---|
| 1 | Cignal HD - San Beda Hawkeyes | 8 | 1 | .889 | — | Outright semi-finals |
| 2 | Racal Tile Master Ceramica | 7 | 2 | .778 | 1 | Outright semi-finals |
| 3 | Café France Bakers | 6 | 3 | .667 (Note: Cafe France 83–67 Tanduay) | 2 | Twice-to-beat in the quarter-finals |
| 4 | Tanduay Rhum Masters | 6 | 3 | .667 | 2 | Twice-to-beat in the quarter-finals |
| 5 | AMA Online Education Titans | 5 | 4 | .556 | 3 | Twice-to-win in the quarter-finals |
| 6 | JRU Heavy Bombers | 4 | 5 | .444 (Note: JRU 70–65 Batangas) | 4 | Twice-to-win in the quarter-finals |
| 7 | Batangas EAC Generals | 4 | 5 | .444 | 4 | Eliminated |
| 8 | Wang's Basketball Couriers | 3 | 6 | .333 (Note: Wangs 92–83 Victoria) | 5 | Eliminated |
| 9 | Victoria's Sports - MLQU | 3 | 6 | .333 | 5 | Eliminated |
| 10 | Blustar Detergent Dragons Malaysia | 0 | 9 | .000 | 8 | Eliminated |

Source: PBA
Rules for classification: a.) Head-to-head matchup b.) Goal average c.) Winning Percentage d.) If necessary, use quotient system

== Playoffs ==
Quarterfinals
#4 seed has 2x-to-beat
4 | Tanduay Rhum Masters | 80
5 | AMA Online Education | 76
#3 seed has 2x-to-beat
3 | Cafe France Bakers | 86
6 | JRU Heavy Bombers | 75

Semifinals (best-of-3 series)
1 | Cignal-San Beda | 2
4 | Tanduay Rhum Masters | 1
2 | Racal Ceramica | 2
3 | Cafe France Bakers | 1

The Finals (best-of-3 series)
1 | Cignal-San Beda | 2
2 | Racal Ceramica | 1

=== Quarter-finals ===
Report

| Tanduay Rhum Masters | 80–76 | AMA Online Education Titans |
Scoring by quarter: 25–16, 21–23, 22–23, 12–14
| Pts: Cruz 23; Rebs: Gaco 8 Asts: Teng 6 | | Pts: Tambeling 27; Rebs: Tambeling 10; Asts: Riley 2 |

Ynares Sports Arena, Pasig

Report

| Café France Bakers | 86–75 | JRU Heavy Bombers |
Scoring by quarter: 15–22, 17–16, 33–27, 21–20
| Pts: Desiderio 16; Rebs: Ebondo 11; Asts: Sedurifa 4 | | Pts: Teodoro 18; Rebs: Bautista 5 Asts: Teodoro 2 |

Ynares Sports Arena, Pasig

=== Semi-finals ===
Report

| Cignal HD - San Beda Hawkeyes | 55–66 | Tanduay Rhum Masters |
Scoring by quarter: 14–11, 6–17, 15–28, 20–10
| Pts: Pamboy Raymundo 13; Rebs: Mocon 6 | | Pts: Gaco 16; Rebs: Jaymo Eguilos 12; Asts: Gaco 2 |
Masters leads series, 1–0

Marikina Sports Center, Marikina

| Cignal HD - San Beda Hawkeyes | vs. | Tanduay Rhum Masters |

| Cignal HD - San Beda Hawkeyes | vs. | Tanduay Rhum Masters |

Report

| Racal Tile Master Ceramica | 88–86 | Café France Bakers |
Scoring by quarter: 22–20, 17–14, 20–26, 29–26
| Pts: Onwubere 24; Rebs: Salado, Corpuz 6 each Asts: Salado 6 | | Pts: Rod Ebondo 30; Rebs: Rod Ebondo 13; Asts: Desiderio 4 |
Racal leads series, 1–0

Marikina Sports Center, Marikina

| Racal Tile Master Ceramica | vs. | Café France Bakers |

| Racal Tile Master Ceramica | vs. | Café France Bakers |

=== Finals ===
AksyonTV

March 30

Report

| Racal Tile Master Ceramica | 85–93 | Cignal HD - San Beda Hawkeyes |
Scoring by quarter: 14–26, 22–29, 23–19, 26–19
| Pts: Nambatac 23; Rebs: Corpuz 8 Asts: Nambatac 6 | | Pts: Perkins 28; Rebs: Perkins 8 Asts: Bolick 6 |

Ynares Sports Arena, Pasig

AksyonTV

April 3

Report

| Racal Tile Master Ceramica | 100–90 | Cignal HD - San Beda Hawkeyes |
Scoring by quarter: 26–22, 31–20, 24–29, 19–19
| Pts: Nambatac 24; Rebs: Corpuz 11; Asts: Nambatac 2 | | Pts: Bolick 18; Rebs: Bolick 10; Asts: Bolick 5 |

Filoil Flying V Center, San Juan City

April 7

Report

| Racal Tile Master Ceramica | 78–81 | Cignal HD - San Beda Hawkeyes |
Scoring by quarter: 23–15, 20–15, 17–24, 22–18
| Pts: Corpuz 24; Rebs: Corpuz, Gabayni 9 each Asts: N/A | | Pts: Mocon 25; Rebs: Mocon 7 Asts: Bolick 6 |
Cignal wins series, 2–1

Ynares Sports Arena, Pasig

== Awards ==
2017 PBA D-League Aspirant's Cup Champions
Cignal–San Beda Hawkeyes
First title
