= NLEX Road Warriors (PBA D-League) =

- League: PBA D-League
- History: NLEX Road Warriors (2010–2014)
- Team colors: Blue, orange, white
- Company: Manila North Tollways Corporation (a subsidiary of Metro Pacific Investments Corporation)
- Head coach: Boyet Fernandez
- Ownership: Manuel V. Pangilinan
- Championships: 6 PBA D-League Championships; 2011 Foundation; 2011 Aspirant's; 2012 Foundation; 2013 Aspirant's; 2014 Aspirant's; 2014 Foundation

The NLEX Road Warriors was a basketball team that played in the PBA Developmental League (PBA D-League) from 2011 to 2014. It was one of the founding teams of the PBA D-League and was owned by Manila North Tollways Corporation (MNTC), a subsidiary of Metro Pacific Investments Corporation. It was the dominant team in the PBA D-League, setting a record six championships in the seven conferences it participated. The franchise transferred to the Philippine Basketball Association after the Manila North Tollways Corporation (a subsidiary of Metro Pacific Investments Corporation) acquired the PBA franchise of the Air21 Express in June 2014.

== Transfer to the PBA ==
=== PBA expansion franchise application ===
In March 2014, Manila North Tollways Corporation (MNTC) submitted its letter of intent to join the PBA as an expansion team. On April 10, 2014, the PBA Board of Governors unanimously approved the application of NLEX, Ever Bilena Cosmetics, Inc. (Blackwater Elite) and Columbian Autocar Corporation (Kia Sorento) as expansion teams for the 2014-2015 season.

As a concession to Kia, which did not have a basketball team in the PBA D-League, the PBA board of governors did not allow Blackwater and NLEX to elevate their D-League players. Instead, the three expansion teams will build their teams through an expansion draft (with the ten existing teams protecting fourteen players in their respective rosters), the free agency and the rookie draft, in which the expansion teams will be given the 11th, 12th and 13th pick in the first round of the 2014 PBA draft.

Additional concessions were given to the three expansion teams at the conclusion of the special meeting by PBA board of governors, three weeks after approving their franchise application. These included the revision of the expansion draft in which the ten existing teams will protect twelve players (from the previous fourteen), and the first three picks of the second round of the 2014 PBA draft. Only the three expansion teams will be allowed to pick players after the third round of the rookie draft.

=== Acquisition of the Air21 Express PBA franchise ===
While Kia and Blackwater have paid their respective franchise fees, NLEX requested for an extension, as they were studying whether to enter the PBA as an expansion team or acquire an existing PBA franchise.

On June 17, 2014, MNTC announced that it was having negotiations with a PBA team to acquire their franchise. Due to the ongoing Governors' Cup playoffs, MNTC did not identify the team they were negotiating with, but stated it will reveal the team's identity once the team was eliminated. Days later, the team was revealed to be Air21 Express.

On June 23, 2014, an agreement was reached between MNTC and the Lina Group of Companies (owners of Air21 Express) regarding the sale of its PBA franchise to MNTC. The sale was approved during the regular monthly meeting of the board of governors, paving the way for the sale of the franchise to MNTC.
