= 2011 PBA D-League Foundation Cup =

2011 PBA PBA D-League Foundation Cup
- Duration: March 12, 2011 - June 16, 2011
- TV partner(s): Sports5; IBC

Finals
- Champions: NLEX Road Warriors (1st title)
- Runners-up: Cebuana Lhuillier Gems

Awards
- Best Player: Allein Maliksi (Cebuana Lhuillier Gems)
- Finals MVP: Calvin Abueva (NLEX Road Warriors)

PBA PBA D-League Foundation Cup chronology
- 2012 >

The 2011 PBA D-League Foundation Cup is the inaugural tournament of the PBA Developmental League.

== Format ==
The following format will be observed for the duration of the conference:

- The teams were divided into 2 groups.

Group A:

1. NLEX Road Warriors
2. Freego Jeans
3. RnW Pacific Pipes
4. Black Water Elite
5. Pharex Naproxen Sodium Bidang Generix
6. PC Gilmore Wizards

Group B:

1. Maynilad Water Dragons
2. Junior Powerade Tigers
3. Max! Bond Super Glue Sumos
4. Cobra Energy Drink Iron Men
5. Cafe France Bakers
6. Cebuana Lhuillier Gems
7. FCA Cultivators

- Teams in a group will play against each other once, Group A will play an extra game, the pairings of which will be decided by lottery; 6 games per team; Teams are then seeded by basis on win–loss records. Ties are broken among point differentials of the tied teams. The top two teams of each group will advance to the semifinals while the next four teams of each group will qualify to the quarterfinals.
- The two bottom-ranked teams in Group B will play a knockout game for the last playoff spot.
- Quarterfinal phase (knockout games):
  - first round
  - Q1: A3 vs. B6
  - Q2: A4 vs. B5
  - Q3: B3 vs. A6
  - Q4: B4 vs. A5
  - second round
  - Q5: A1 vs. Q4
  - Q6: A2 vs. Q3
  - Q7: B1 vs. Q2
  - Q8: B2 vs. Q1
- Semifinals (knockout games):
  - SFA: Q5 vs. Q8
  - SFB: Q6 vs. Q7
- Best-of-three Finals: winners of the semifinals.

== Elimination round ==
y – clinched outright semifinals, x – clinched quarterfinals, e – eliminated

2011 PBADL Foundation Cup Standings
Team	W	L	PCT
NLEX Road Warriors	5	1	0.833
PC Gilmore Wizards	4	2	0.667
Black Water Elite	3	3	0.500
Freego Jeans	2	4	0.333
RnW Pacific Pipes	2	4	0.333
Pharex Naproxen Sodium Bidang Generix	2	4	0.333
Group B
Team	W	L	PCT
Cebuana Lhuillier Gems	5	1	0.833
Max Bond Super Glue Sumos	4	2	0.667
Cobra Energy Drink Iron Men	4	2	0.667
FCA Cultivators	3	3	0.500
Maynilad Water Dragons	3	3	0.500
Junior Powerade Tigers	1	5	0.166
Café France	1	5	0.166

== Playoff round ==
The top two teams of each group will be automatically in the quarter-finals second round. But, in group B, there are seven teams. So, the two teams who are in the lowest standings will be battle for the knockout stage. It will be Junior Powerade Tigers and the Cafe France.

From Quarter-finals to Semi-finals the game is always knockout. But in the finals, it is best of 3 series.

=== Bracket ===
Knockout Game (May 24)
B6	Junior Powerade	77
B7	Cafe France	65

Quarterfinals; 1st round (May 26 & 31)
B4	FCA	65
A5	RnW	61
A3	Black Water	70
B6	Junior Powerade	66
A4	Freego	88
B5	Maynilad	81
B3	Cobra	66
A6	Pharex	96

Quarterfinals; 2nd round (June 2 & 7)
A1	NLEX	100
B4	FCA	71
B2	Max Bond	74
A3	Black Water	71
B1	Cebuana Lhuiller	71
A4	Freego	64
A2	PC Gilmore	92
A6	Pharex	77

Semifinals (June 9)
A1	NLEX	74
B2	Max Bond	61
B1	Cebuana Lhuiller	83
A2	PC Gilmore	55

Finals (June 14 & 16)
A1	NLEX	2
B1	Cebuana Lhuiller	0

=== Knockout stage ===
May 24

Junior Powerade Tigers 77, Cafe France 65

San Juan Gym, San Juan, Metro Manila

=== Quarterfinals ===
==== First round ====
Q1

May 26

Black Water Elite 70, Junior Powerade Tigers 66

San Juan Gym, San Juan, Metro Manila

Q2

May 26

Freego Jeans 88, Maynilad Water Dragons 81

San Juan Gym, San Juan, Metro Manila

Q3

May 31

Cobra Energy Drink Iron Men 66, Pharex Naproxen Sodium Bidang Generix 96

San Juan Gym, San Juan, Metro Manila

Q4

May 31

FCA Cultivators 65, RnW Pacific Pipes 61

San Juan Gym, San Juan, Metro Manila

==== Second round ====
Q5

June 7

NLEX Road Warriors 100, FCA Cultivators 71

San Juan Gym, San Juan, Metro Manila

Q6

June 2

PC Gilmore Wizards 92, Pharex Naproxen Sodium Bidang Generix 77

San Juan Gym, San Juan, Metro Manila

Q7

June 2

Cebuana Lhuillier Gems 71, Freego Jeans 64

San Juan Gym, San Juan, Metro Manila

Q8

June 7

Max Bond Super Glue Sumos 74, Black Water Elite 71

San Juan Gym, San Juan, Metro Manila

=== Semi-finals ===
SF1

June 9

Cebuana Lhuillier Gems 83, PC Gilmore Wizards 55

San Juan Gym, San Juan, Metro Manila

SF2

June 9

Max Bond Super Glue Sumos 61, NLEX Road Warriors 74

San Juan Gym, San Juan, Metro Manila

=== Finals ===
F1

June 14

NLEX Road Warriors 76, Cebuana Lhuillier Gems 62

San Juan Gym, San Juan, Metro Manila

F2

June 16

NLEX Road Warriors 61, Cebuana Lhuillier Gems 59
NLEX win series, 2-0

San Juan Gym, San Juan, Metro Manila

== See also ==
- List of developmental and minor sports leagues
- PBA Developmental League
- Philippine Basketball Association
