= Anthony Bringas =

Filipino basketball player

GenSan Warriors
- Position: Power forward / center
- League: MPBL

Personal information
- Born: April 27, 1988 (age 38) Orani, Bataan, Philippines
- Listed height: 6 ft 5 in (1.96 m)
- Listed weight: 263 lb (119 kg)

Career information
- College: FEU
- PBA draft: 2013: 7th round, 44th overall pick
- Drafted by: Meralco Bolts
- Playing career: 2013–2014, 2019–present

Career history
- 2013–2014: Meralco Bolts
- 2019–2021: Basilan Steel / Peace Riders / Jumbo Plastic
- 2022: Nueva Ecija Capitals / Rice Vanguards
- 2023: Makati OKBet Kings
- 2024: Abra Weavers
- 2025–present: GenSan Warriors

Mark Anthony "Tonton" Bringas (born April 27, 1988) is a Filipino professional basketball player for the GenSan Warriors of the Maharlika Pilipinas Basketball League (MPBL). He was drafted by Meralco Bolts with their 44th pick in the 2013 PBA draft.

== PBA career statistics ==
Legend
GP	Games played	MPG	Minutes per game
FG%	Field-goal percentage	3P%	3-point field-goal percentage	FT%	Free-throw percentage
RPG	Rebounds per game	APG	Assists per game	SPG	Steals per game
BPG	Blocks per game	PPG	Points per game	**Bold**	Career high

Year	Team	GP	MPG	FG%	3P%	FT%	RPG	APG	SPG	BPG	PPG
2013–14	Meralco	7	5.6	.400	—	—	2.1	.4	.1	.0	1.1
Career		7	5.6	.400	—	—	2.1	.4	.1	.0	1.1
