= Z.C. Mindanao Aguilas =

Filipino basketball team

ZC Mindanao Aguilas
- Leagues: PBA D-League (2016)
- Founded: 2015
- Folded: 2016
- History: Z.C. Mindanao Aguilas; 2015–2016
- Location: Philippines
- Team colors
- Head coach: Jade Marvin Padrigao
Home

The ZC Mindanao Aguilas is a basketball team playing in the PBA Developmental League. The team primarily focuses on giving exposure to Mindanao-based players who receive less attention than their Metro Manila counterparts.

The team made their debut at the 2016 PBA D-League Aspirant's Cup. and earned their first win against BDO-NU Bulldogs.

The team is managed by Kings Janitorial Services and Cooperative of Zamboanga, and is an affiliated team of GlobalPort Batang Pier in the Philippine Basketball League.

Prior to joining the Aspirant's Cup, the team has been preparing for two months for their PBA D-League stint. They won a local tournament in Zamboanga and participated at the Del League in Marikina. They also arranged tune games against Phoenix Petroleum and BDO. They lost both games.

== Coaching Staff & Players ==
=== Coaching staff ===
Team Owners

- Roderick Andong
- Antonio Chiong
- Junnie Navarro

Team Manager

- Sergei Bien Orillo

Team Consultant

- Louie Medalla

Head Coach

- Nino Rejhi Natividad

Assistant Coaches:

- Jade Marvin Padrigao (1st Asst.)
- Nadz Burung
- Peter Delegero

=== Current roster ===
2016 Aspirants Cup

- 3 Jul-Ashri Ignacio 26, 6′-1″
- 24 Gino Jumao-As 23, 6′-2″
- 27 Taylor Wetherell 25, 6′-0″
- 25 Dexter Garcia 26, 5′-11″
- 9 Jaynard Rivera 25, 6′-4″
- 19 Jericho de Guzman 26, 6′-11″
- 8 Ar-Rouf Julkipli 25, 5′-9″
- 23 Ivan Villanueva 20, 6′-2″
- 18 Kenneth Acibar 26, 6′-4″
- 10 Joseph Nalos 23, 5′-8″
- 14 Rolando Navarro Jr. 29, 5′-8″
- 6 Mark Sarangay 29, 6′-5″
- 13 JR Ongteco 26, 6′-5″
- 88 Grevanni Rublico 25, 5′-11″

=== Former players ===
- # Mark Barroca
- # RR Garcia
