= Fruitas Shakers =

Fruitas Shakers logo

The Fruitas Shakers are the team in the PBA D-League for two conferences in 2012 PBA D-League Aspirant's Cup and 2013 PBA D-League Foundation Cup. They are affiliated with Talk 'N Text Tropang Texters in PBA. Their coach is Nash Racela and most of their players are coming from San Beda College.

== Roster ==
=== 2012–13 Aspirants Cup ===
Fruitas Shakers roster
Players
Coaches

Pos.	No.	Nat.	Name	Ht.	Wt.
F	0	(Philippines)	Martin Antonio	6 ft 4 in (1.93 m)
G	1	(Philippines)	Jai Reyes	5 ft 8 in (1.73 m)	225 lb (102 kg)
F	2	(Philippines)	Joseph Eriobu	6 ft 3 in (1.91 m)
C	4	(Philippines)	Jason Escueta	6 ft 5 in (1.96 m)
F	5	(Philippines)	Jolas Paguia	6 ft 4 in (1.93 m)
G	6	(Philippines)	Carlo Lastimosa	6 ft 0 in (1.83 m)	182 lb (83 kg)
G	9	(Philippines)	Levi Hernandez	6 ft 1 in (1.85 m)
F/C	14	(Philippines)	Jan Colina	6 ft 3 in (1.91 m)
G	20	(Philippines)	Gene Belleza	6 ft 0 in (1.83 m)
G	23	(Philippines)	Joseph Terso	5 ft 10 in (1.78 m)

Head coach

- Nash Racela

Legend

- (C) Team captain
- Injured

== Controversy ==
On October 25, 2012, the Shakers debut with an 88-82 win over Cafe France at the Ynares Sports Arena in Pasig. Their win was forfeited by the league when they field in an ineligible player Joseph Eriobu in the second quarter of that game. Eriobu lack the documentary requirements to prove that he is a Filipino citizen. PBA Commissioner Chito Salud also slapped the team with a ₱25,000 fine.
