= Blackwater Sports =

Philippine basketball team

- Leagues: PBA D-League
- Founded: 2006
- Dissolved: 2014
- History: Blackwater Elite (2011); Blackwater Sports (2012–2014)
- Location: Philippines
- Team colors: Black, White
- President: Dioceldo S. Sy
- Head coach: Leo Isaac
- Championships: 1 (2013 Foundation Cup)

The Blackwater Sports was a basketball team that played in the PBA Developmental League (PBA D-League) from 2011 to 2014. It was one of the founding teams of the PBA D-League and was owned by Ever Bilena Cosmetics, Inc. The team was originally named Blackwater Elite during the 2011 season. The franchise moved to the Philippine Basketball Association in 2014 as an expansion team and will play under the name Blackwater Elite.

The franchise's predecessor was the Blu Detergent team in the Philippine Basketball League (PBL), best known as the first Philippine basketball team of Asi Taulava.

On April 10, 2014, Ever Bilena Cosmetics, Inc., along with Manila North Tollways Corporation (NLEX Road Warriors) and Columbian Autocar Corporation (Kia Sorento) were given approval by the PBA Board of Governors to become expansion teams in the PBA. Blackwater and the NLEX Road Warriors became the first PBA D-League franchises to move to the PBA.
