= Cagayan Rising Suns =

- Leagues: PBA D-League (2012–2015); PCBL (2015)
- Founded: 2012
- Dissolved: 2015
- Location: Philippines
- Team colors: Maroon, Gold, White
- Head coach: Alvin Pua

The Cagayan Rising Suns were a basketball team owned by the family of Alvaro Antonio and represented the province of Cagayan. The team played in the PBA D-League for most of its history.

== History ==
The team debuted in the 2012 PBA D-League Foundation Cup, finishing with a disappointing 0–9 record. Many players were added to the roster, including Letran center Raymond Almazan and former Far Eastern University (FEU) stalwart Chris Exciminiano, who still led in rebounding and scoring, respectively. Then, they had a good 2-0 start but lost to Erase XFoliant Erasers, 78–91.

On May 17, 2015, the team announced it would leave the PBA D-League after the 2015 Foundation Cup, following the lifetime ban imposed on coach Alvin Pua. The ban on Pua was imposed after his attack on referee Benjie Montero during the team’s game against Livermarin on May 13, 2015. Pua was also fined 500,000 pesos. Team manager Frederic Collado was also fined ₱20,000 for his critical comments.

After leaving the PBA D-League, the team was in talks to join the proposed Countrywide Basketball League. However, nothing materialized.

The team was one of the inaugural clubs in the now-defunct Pilipinas Commercial Basketball League (PCBL) in 2015.

== See also ==
- Cagayan Valley Rising Suns (men's volleyball team)
- Cagayan Valley Lady Rising Suns (women's volleyball team)
