= Big Chill Super Chargers =

Filipino basketball team

- Leagues: Philippine Basketball League (2010); PBA Developmental League (2011-2014)
- Founded: 2010
- Folded: 2014
- History: FCA Cultivators; 2010-2011; Big Chill Super Chargers; 2011-2014
- Location: Philippines
- Team colors: Sky Blue, White
- Head coach: Robert Sison
- Website: PBA D-League website
Home	Away

The Big Chill Super Chargers is a basketball team currently playing in the PBA Developmental League and is owned by Agri Nurture, Inc. The team also played for the Philippine Basketball League as the FCA Cultivators for the league's 2010 season.

== Finals stint ==
Big Chill finished runner-up to NLEX Road Warriors twice, during the 2011-12 PBA D-League Foundation Cup and the 2013-14 Aspirants Cup.

== Roster list (2011) ==
- Jeckster Apinan
- Juneric Baloria
- Rodney Brondial
- Mark Angelo Canlas #9
- Reil Cervantes
- Jesse James Collado #29
- Jopher Custodio #26
- June Dizon #4
- Jerry Glorioso #8
- Brian Heruela
- Keith Jensen #32
- Janus Lozada #24
- John Dexter Maiquez #11
- Alex Mallari #11
- Rafael Mangahas #9
- Jefferson Morillo #5
- Terrence Romeo #7
- Allan Santos #12
- Thomas Elliot Tan #6
- Jess Mar Villahermosa

== 2010 PBL roster ==
ANI - FCA Cultivators; Roster
Head coach: Toto Dojillo
PG	3	Mark Cagoco	Jose Rizal University
SG	4	Garri Keith Sevilla	College of Saint Benilde
F/C	5	Jason Pascual	Mapua Tech
PG	7	Rio Zaldy Flores
PG	8	Cielito Gelasque
F	9	Macky Acosta	Mapua Tech
F	12	Jopher Custodio	MLQU
G/F	13	Roman Ong
F	15	Neil Pascual	Mapua Tech
F	16	Raymond Matias
PG	17	Hywel Shaun Lee
PG	18	Christopher Otacan
F	19	Allen Morales
F/C	31	James Ryan Sena	Jose Rizal University
G/F	45	Christian Luanzon	UST
(C) - Captain, (I) - Import, (R) - Reserve, (S) - Suspended			ANI - FCA Cultivators

Other people

- Assistant coaches: Jefferson Te, Freddie Tanlo, Paul Li
- Team Owner: Mr.Antonio Tiu
- Board Representative: Mr.James Tiu
- Team Manager: Mr.Roman Ong
