= PBA D-League =

Basketball league in the Philippines

- Most recent season or competition: 2024 PBA D-League Aspirants' Cup
- Sport: Basketball
- Founded: 2011
- First season: 2011
- Folded: 2024
- Commissioner: Willie Marcial
- Motto: "The Road to the PBA Starts Here."
- No. of teams: 6
- Country: Philippines
- Continent: FIBA Asia (Asia)
- Last champions: Eco Oil-La Salle Green Archers (3rd title)
- Most titles: NLEX Road Warriors (6 titles)
- Broadcasters: RPTV, PBA Rush
- Website: pba.ph

The PBA Developmental League, commonly known as the PBA D-League, was the official minor league of the Philippine Basketball Association. Until 2021, the league also served as a pathway to the PBA, as players were required to compete in the league to be eligible for the draft.

The league usually hosts one or two tournaments per PBA season, but hasn't hosted a tournament since the 2024–25 season. It is unknown if the league will host further tournaments or had a fate similar to the defunct PBA 3x3 league.

== History ==
The PBA D-League was conceptualized after the collapse of the proposed merger between the Philippine Basketball League (PBL) and Liga Pilipinas after the staging of the Tournament of the Philippines which was composed by PBL and Liga Pilipinas teams. PBA Commissioner Chito Salud proposed the formation of a PBA D-League, which will fill the void left by the PBL. On January 2011, the PBA Board of Governors approved the proposal.

The maiden tournament, named "Foundation Cup" began on March 12, 2011 at the Filoil Flying V Arena in San Juan. The tournament composed of 13 teams, with five teams (Junior Powerade, NLEX, Maynilad, Freego and Cafe France) having affiliation with existing PBA teams. Four teams (Cobra Energy Drink, Agri-Nature Inc./FCA, Pharex, and Cafe France) from the Philippine Basketball League filed for application in the PBA D-League, when they failed to acquire a sixth team in order to smoothly run the league. The NLEX Road Warriors became the champions of the tournament, winning two games to none against the Cebuana Lhuillier Gems.

The second tournament, dubbed as the "Aspirant's Cup" began on October 20. Four teams (Maynilad, Junior Powerade, Max Bond and Pharex) did not join the tournament. However, two new teams (Boracay Rum and Informatics) made their debut in the D-League.

The D-League has held its own rookie draft since the 2013–14 PBA season.

In August 2015, the PBA approved plans for a nationwide D-League and a Women's D-League that will open soon. From 2016, the men's competition was first to be held in three separate, simultaneous tournaments, first in Luzon and later in the Visayas and Mindanao. The three regional champions would join the national championship round which would be joined by Metro Manila teams. However the plan was never fully realized with the Northern Luzon tournament never finished and the Visayas tournament cancelled.

The 2020 season was indefinitely postponed in March 2020 with only some games of the Aspirants Cup played before the season was cancelled altogether in September 2020 due to the COVID-19 pandemic. The league has not held games as of 2021. The resumption of the D-League has been hampered by the fact that league heavily relies on school-based teams.

== Teams ==
Teams in the PBA D-League had to pay a participating fee either on a per conference or per season basis. Unlike the PBA, the number of participating teams may vary per conference.

=== Current teams (2024) ===
Team	Company / College	Joined	Titles	Head coach	PBA affiliate
CCI–Yengskivel Crusaders	Cornerstone College (SJDM, Bulacan); Yengskivel Sportswear	2024 Aspirants'	0	Arwin Villamor Adina	—N/a
CEU Scorpions	Centro Escolar University	2017 Foundation	0	Jeff Perlas	—N/a
EcoOil–La Salle Green Archers	EcoOil Ltd. De La Salle University	2020 Aspirants'	3	Topex Robinson	—N/a
GoTorakku–St. Clare Saints	Torakku Motor Assembly; St. Clare College of Caloocan	2024 Aspirants'	0	Jinino Manansala	—N/a
Keanzel Believers	Keanzel Basketball	2024 Aspirants'	0	Mark Herrera	—N/a
Marinerong Pilipino Skippers–San Beda	Marinerong Pilipino Group; San Beda University	2017 Foundation	0	Yuri Escueta	TNT Tropang Giga

=== Former teams ===
Team	Owner	PBA affiliate	First tournament	Last tournament
FCA Cultivators; Big Chill Super Chargers	Agri-Nurture, Inc.	—N/a	2011 Foundation	2014 Foundation
Maynilad Water Dragons	Maynilad Water Services Inc.	Talk 'N Text Tropang Texters	2011 Foundation	2011 Foundation
Max Bond Super Glue Sumos	Magnaprime Corporation	—N/a	2011 Foundation	2011 Foundation
Pharex Naproxen Sodium Bidang Generix	Pascual Laboratories, Inc.	—N/a	2011 Foundation	2011 Foundation
Freego Jeans	EINSCO Inc.	—N/a	2011 Foundation	2012 Aspirant's
Cobra Energy Drink Iron Men	Asia Brewery, Inc.	—N/a	2011 Foundation	2012 Aspirant's
Dub Unlimited Wheelers	Mega Dub Unlimited Specialist Inc.	—N/a	2012 Aspirant's	2012 Aspirant's
Junior Powerade Tigers	Coca-Cola Bottlers Philippines, Inc.	Powerade Tigers	2011 Foundation	2012 Foundation
PC Gilmore Wizards	PC Gilmore, Inc.	—N/a	2011 Aspirant's	2012 Aspirant's
RnW Pacific Pipes Steelmasters	RnW Pacific Pipes Corporation	—N/a	2011 Foundation	2012 Foundation
Erase XFoliant Erasers	Universal Knowledge DermPharma, Inc.	GlobalPort Batang Pier	2012 Foundation	2012 Aspirants
Informatics Icons	Informatics International University	—N/a	2012 Aspirants	2013 Foundation
Fruitas Shakers	Fruitas Group	Talk 'N Text Tropang Texters	2012 Aspirants	2013 Foundation
Jumbo Plastic Linoleum Giants	AliKaiser International Incorporated	—N/a	2013 Foundation	2015 Foundation
EA Regen Med Regens	EA Regen Medical Group, Inc.	—N/a	2013 Foundation	2013 Foundation
Arellano Chiefs	Arellano University	Air21 Express	2013 Aspirants	2013 Aspirants
NLEX Road Warriors	Metro Pacific Investments Corporation	Meralco Bolts	2011 Foundation	2014 Foundation
Boracay Rum Waves	Asia Brewery, Inc.	—N/a	2012 Foundation	2013 Foundation
Blackwater Sports	Ever Bilena Cosmetics, Inc.	—N/a	2011 Foundation	2014 Foundation
Hog's Breath Cafe Razorbacks	Hog's Breath Cafe	—N/a	2013 Foundation	2014 Foundation
Derulo Accelero Oilers	UR Value Corporation	Alaska Aces	2013 Aspirants	2014 Foundation
MJM M-Builders	Mercado Builders; MJM Productions, Inc.	—N/a	2013 Aspirants	2014 Aspirants
Bread Story Smashing Bakers	Bread Story Philippines	Barangay Ginebra San Miguel	2014 Aspirants	2014 Aspirants
Cagayan Valley Rising Suns	Cagayan Province LGU	—N/a	2012 Foundation	2015 Foundation
Hapee Fresh Fighters	Lamoiyan Corporation	NLEX Road Warriors	2014 Aspirants	2015 Foundation
Cebuana Lhuillier Gems	Cebuana Lhuillier	—N/a	2011 Foundation	2015 Foundation
MP Hotel Warriors	MP Promotions, Inc.	Kia Carnival	2014 Aspirants	2015 Foundation
LiverMarin Guardians - San Sebastian Golden Stags	ATC Healthcare Corporation; San Sebastian College - Recoletos	—N/a	2015 Foundation	2015 Foundation
BDO - NU Bulldogs	BDO Unibank, Inc. National University	Blackwater Elite	2013 Aspirants	2016 Aspirants
Phoenix Accelerators	Phoenix Petroleum Philippines, Inc.	Phoenix Fuelmasters	2016 Aspirants	2016 Foundation
QRS / JAM Liner - UP Fighting Maroons	QRS Logistics; JAM Liner, Inc. University of the Philippines	Mahindra Enforcer	2016 Aspirants	2016 Aspirants
Z.C. Mindanao Aguilas	Kings Janitorial Services and Cooperative of Zamboanga	Globalport Batang Pier	2016 Aspirants	2016 Foundation
Victoria Sports - MLQU Stallions	Victoria Sports; Manuel L. Quezon University	—N/a	2017 Aspirants	2017 Aspirants
Blustar Detergent Dragons - Malaysia	Ever Bilena Cosmetics, Inc. Westports Malaysia Holdings	Blackwater Elite	2016 Foundation	2017 Aspirants
Cafe France Bakers	Cafe France Corporation	Rain or Shine Elasto Painters	2011 Foundation	2017 Aspirants
Racal Motors Alibaba; Caida Tile Masters	Racal Group of Companies	—N/a	2014 Aspirants	2017 Foundation
Flying V Thunder	Flying V Petroleum	—N/a	2017 Foundation	2017 Foundation
Tanduay Rhum Masters	Tanduay Distillers, Inc.	—N/a	2011 Foundation	2017 Foundation
Mila's Lechon Mighty Roasters	Mila's Lechon and Restaurant	—N/a	2018 Aspirants	2018 Aspirants
Akari - Adamson Soaring Falcons	Akari Lighting and Technology Corporation; Adamson University	—N/a	2018 Aspirants	2018 Aspirants
Gamboa Coffee Mixers	Universal Knowledge DermPharma, Inc.	—N/a	2017 Foundation	2018 Aspirants
Zark's Jawbreakers: LPU Pirates	Zark's Burgers; Lyceum of the Philippines University	Phoenix Fuelmasters	2017 Foundation	2018 Aspirants
JRU Heavy Bombers	Jose Rizal University	Barangay Ginebra San Miguel	2012 Foundation	2018 Aspirants
Cignal HD Hawkeyes; Cignal HD - Ateneo Blue Eagles	Cignal TV, Inc. Ateneo de Manila University	NLEX Road Warriors	2017 Aspirants	2019 Aspirants
Che'Lu Bar & Grill Revellers	Hydra Connection Entertainment Corporation	—N/a	2018 Aspirants	2019 Aspirants
Go For Gold Scratchers: College of Saint Benilde Blazers	Powerball Marketing & Logistics Corporation; De La Salle-College of Saint Benilde	Blackwater Elite	2018 Aspirants	2019 Aspirants
The Masterpiece / CD14 Designs - Trinity Stallions	The Masterpiece Clothing; CD14 Designs Custom Sports Apparels; Trinity University of Asia	—N/a	2019 Aspirants	2019 Aspirants
Metropac Movers: San Beda Red Lions	Metro Pacific Investments Corporation; San Beda University	TNT Katropa	2019 Aspirants	2019 Aspirants
SMDC - NU Bulldogs	SM Development Corporation; National University	—N/a	2019 Aspirants	2019 Aspirants
Batangas EAC Generals	Batangas Province LGU; Emilio Aguinaldo College	Meralco Bolts	2017 Aspirants	2019 Aspirants
Petron - Letran Knights	Petron Corporation; Colegio de San Juan de Letran	San Miguel Beermen	2019 Aspirants	2019 Aspirants
FEU Tamaraws	Cha Dao Tea Place; Seaoil Philippines; Far Eastern University	Magnolia Hotshots	2019 Aspirants	2020 Aspirants
Apex Fuel - San Sebastian Golden Stags	Apex Fuel Mindanao; San Sebastian College-Recoletos	—N/a	2019 Aspirants	2022 Aspirants
Builders Warehouse - UST Growling Tigers	Racal Group of Companies; University of Santo Tomas	—N/a	2019 Aspirants	2022 Aspirants
Nail Talk & Beauty Spa: St. Dominic Savio Unicorns	Nail Talk & Beauty Spa; St. Dominic Savio College	—N/a	2019 Foundation	2019 Foundation
iWalk Chargers	iWalk Philippines	—N/a	2019 Foundation	2019 Foundation
Italianos Homme	Italianos Homme Shoes	—N/a	2019 Foundation	2019 Foundation
McDavid Apparels - De La Salle Araneta Stallions	McDavid Philippines; De La Salle Araneta University	—N/a	2019 Aspirants	2019 Foundation
Diliman College Blue Dragons	Diliman College	GlobalPort Batang Pier	2019 Aspirants	2020 Aspirants
FamilyMart - Enderun Titans	FamilyMart; Enderun Colleges	Phoenix Super LPG Fuel Masters	2019 Aspirants	2020 Aspirants
BRT Sumisip Basilan - St. Clare Saints	St. Clare College of Caloocan; Province of Basilan LGU	—N/a	2019 Aspirants	2019 Foundation
Hyperwash Vipers	Hyperwash Laundromat	—N/a	2019 Foundation	2019 Foundation
Asia's Lashes Soldiers	Asia's Lashes; Tomas Morato, Quezon City	—N/a	2019 Foundation	2019 Foundation
Alberei Kings	Alberei Advertising Corporation; Zamboanga City, Zamboanga del Sur	—N/a	2019 Foundation	2019 Foundation
Hazchem Green Warriors	Hazchem Inc. Calamba, Laguna	—N/a	2019 Foundation	2019 Foundation
Black Mamba Energy Drink	Corbridge Group Philippines	—N/a	2019 Foundation	2019 Foundation
ADG Dong - Mapua Cardinals	ADG Group of Companies; Mapua University	Blackwater Elite	2020 Aspirants	2020 Aspirants
TIP Engineers	Technological Institute of the Philippines	—N/a	2019 Foundation	2020 Aspirants
Adalem Construction - St. Clare College	Adalem Construction; St. Clare College of Caloocan	—N/a	2022 Aspirants	2022 Aspirants
AMA Online Education Titans	AMA University	—N/a	2014 Aspirants	2023 Aspirants'
Perpetual Help Altas	University of Perpetual Help System DALTA	—N/a	2018 Aspirants'	2023 Aspirants'
PSP Gymers	Philippine Sports Performance Fitness Centre	—N/a	2023 Aspirants'	2023 Aspirants'
Wang's Basketball–Letran	PRC Courier & Maintenance Services; Colegio de San Juan de Letran	NorthPort Batang Pier	2013 Aspirants'	2023 Aspirants'

== List of champions ==
PBA season	Conference	Champion	Series	Runner-Up	Winning coach	Conference MVP	Team
2011	Foundation	NLEX	2-0	Cebuana Lhuillier	Boyet Fernandez	Allein Maliksi	Cebuana Lhuillier
2011–12	Aspirants'	NLEX	2-0	Freego	Boyet Fernandez	Vic Manuel	Cebuana Lhuillier
2011–12	Foundation	NLEX	2-0	Big Chill	Boyet Fernandez	Cliff Hodge	NLEX
2012–13	Aspirants'	NLEX	2-0	Cagayan	Boyet Fernandez	Ian Sangalang	NLEX
2012–13	Foundation	Blackwater	2-0	NLEX	Leo Isaac	Jake Pascual	NLEX
2013–14	Aspirants'	NLEX	2-0	Big Chill	Boyet Fernandez	Garvo Lanete	NLEX
2013–14	Foundation	NLEX	2-0	Blackwater	Boyet Fernandez	Kevin Alas	NLEX
2014–15	Aspirants'	Hapee	2-0	Cagayan	Ronnie Magsanoc	Bobby Ray Parks Jr.	Hapee
2014–15	Foundation	Café France	2-1	Hapee	Edgar Macaraya	Moala Tautuaa	Cebuana Lhuillier
2016	Aspirants'	Phoenix	3-2	Café France	Eric Gonzales	Mac Belo	Phoenix
2016	Foundation	Phoenix	2-1	Tanduay	Eric Gonzales	Mike Tolomia	Phoenix
2017	Aspirants'	Cignal HD - San Beda	2-1	Racal Tile	Boyet Fernandez	Robert Bolick	Cignal HD - San Beda
2017	Foundation	Cignal HD	2-0	CEU	Boyet Fernandez	Raymar Jose	Cignal HD
2018	Aspirants'	Zark's Burgers - LPU	2-1	Che'Lu Bar and Grill - SSC-R	Topex Robinson	CJ Perez	Zark's Burgers - LPU
2018	Foundation	Go for Gold	3-2	Che'Lu Bar and Grill	Charles Tiu	Jeff Viernes	Che'Lu Bar and Grill
2019	Aspirants'	Cignal HD - Ateneo	3-1	CEU	Tab Baldwin	Isaac Go	Cignal HD - Ateneo
2019	Foundation	BRT Sumisip Basilan-St. Clare	2-1	Marinerong Pilipino	Stevenson Tiu	Eliud Poligrates	Marinerong Pilipino
2020	Aspirants'	Cancelled due to COVID-19 pandemic					
2022	Aspirants'	EcoOil–La Salle	2-1	Marinerong Pilipino	Derrick Pumaren	Juan Gómez de Liaño	Marinerong Pilipino
2023	Aspirants'	EcoOil–La Salle	2-0	Marinerong Pilipino - San Beda	Topex Robinson	Kevin Quiambao	EcoOil–La Salle
2024	Aspirants'	EcoOil–La Salle	2-0	CEU	Topex Robinson	Michael Philips	EcoOil–La Salle

== See also ==
- Philippine Basketball Association
- PBA Rush
- Basketball in the Philippines
- List of developmental and minor sports leagues
