= Tanduay Light Rhum Masters =

- Leagues: PBA D-League
- Founded: 2012
- Folded: 2017
- History: Boracay Rum Waves; 2012–2014; Tanduay Light Rhum Masters; 2014–2017
- Location: Philippines
- Team colors: Boracay Rum Waves (2012–2014) Tanduay Light Rhum Masters (2014–2017)
- President: Lucio K. Tan, Jr.
- Head coach: Lawrence Chongson
Home	Away

The Tanduay Light Rhum Masters were a basketball team which played in the PBA D-League. The team was owned by Tanduay Distillers, Inc. and was originally known as the Boracay Rhum Waves (2012–2014), which succeeded the Cobra Energy Drink Iron Men (2009–2012).

== History ==
First known as the Boracay Rum Waves, they made their PBA D-League debut during the league's second tournament during the 2011–12 season.

== Notable roster ==
Tanduay Light Rhum Masters roster
Players

Pos.	#	POB	Name	Height	Weight	DOB (YYYY–MM–DD)	From
G	5	(Philippines)	Joseph Terso	5 ft 10 in (1.78 m)	162 lb (73 kg)		National-U
G	6	(Philippines)	Andretti Stevens	5 ft 11 in (1.80 m)			Mapúa
F/C	8	(Philippines)	Jaymo Eguilos	6 ft 5 in (1.96 m)	204 lb (93 kg)		Far Eastern
F	9	(Philippines)	Adrian Santos	6 ft 3 in (1.91 m)			UE
F	10	(United States)	Paul Varilla	6 ft 3 in (1.91 m)			UE
F	11	(Philippines)	Paul Sanga	6 ft 4 in (1.93 m)	172 lb (78 kg)		Far Eastern
F/C	14	(Philippines)	Jay-R Taganas	6 ft 3 in (1.91 m)			San Beda
G	16	(Philippines)	Emil Palma	6 ft 1 in (1.85 m)			UE
F/C	17	(Philippines)	Jomari Sollano	6 ft 4 in (1.93 m)			Letran
F	18	(Philippines)	Dennice Villamor	6 ft 4 in (1.93 m)	195 lb (88 kg)		National-U
F	19	(Philippines)	Jerwin Gaco	6 ft 4 in (1.93 m)	180 lb (82 kg)		De La Salle
G	22	(Philippines)	Lester Alvarez	5 ft 9 in (1.75 m)	154 lb (70 kg)		Adamson
F	34	(Philippines)	Louie Vigil	6 ft 3 in (1.91 m)			UST
G	41	(Philippines)	John Tambeling	6 ft 0 in (1.83 m)			Letran

Coaches
Head coach
- (Philippines) Lawrence Chongson
Assistant(s)
- (Philippines) Randy Alcantara
- (Philippines) Joselito Aguilar
- (Philippines) Marionne Josef Baleno
- (Philippines) Arnel Syyap
- (Philippines) Michael Tan

Legend
- (DP) Unsigned draft pick
- (FA) Free agent
- (S) Suspended
- Injured

== See also ==
- Tanduay Rhum Masters (PBA)
- Stag Pale Pilseners (PBL)
- Manila Beer Brewmasters (PBA)
