= 2017–18 Barangay Ginebra San Miguel season =

- Head coach: Tim Cone
- Owners: Ginebra San Miguel, Inc. (a San Miguel Corporation subsidiary)

Philippine Cup results
- Record: 6–5 (54.5%)
- Place: 4th
- Playoff finish: Semifinalist (lost to San Miguel, 1–4)

Commissioner's Cup results
- Record: 6–5 (54.5%)
- Place: 5th
- Playoff finish: Champions (Defeated San Miguel, 4–2)

Governors' Cup results
- Record: 9–2 (81.8%)
- Place: 1st
- Playoff finish: Semifinalist (lost to Magnolia, 1–3)

Barangay Ginebra San Miguel seasons

The 2017–18 Barangay Ginebra San Miguel season was the 39th season of the franchise in the Philippine Basketball Association (PBA).

== Key dates ==
=== 2017 ===
- October 29: The 2017 PBA draft took place in Midtown Atrium, Robinson Place Manila.
- October 30: Jayjay Helterbrand officially announced his retirement after playing 17 seasons in the PBA, all of them with the Barangay Ginebra San Miguel franchise.

== Draft picks ==
Round	Pick	Player	Position	Nationality	PBA D-League team	College
1	12	Jett Manuel	G	Philippines	Wang's Basketball Couriers	UP
3	11	Elmer Mykiel Cabahug	F	Philippines	Wang's Couriers; Flying V Thunder	Ateneo

== Roster ==
2017–18 Barangay Ginebra San Miguel roster
Players
Coaches

Pos.	#	POB	Name	Height	Weight	DOB (YYYY–MM–DD)	From
G/F	1	(United States)	Julian Sargent (R)	6 ft 3 in (1.91 m)	202 lb (92 kg)	1991–07–15	De La Salle
G	2	(Philippines)	Jett Manuel (R)	6 ft 1 in (1.85 m)	180 lb (82 kg)	1992–09–22	Philippines
G	3	(United States)	Sol Mercado (C)	6 ft 1 in (1.85 m)	200 lb (91 kg)	1984–05–06	Biola
G	5	(Philippines)	LA Tenorio	5 ft 8 in (1.73 m)	151 lb (68 kg)	1984–07–09	Ateneo
G	6	(Philippines)	Scottie Thompson	6 ft 1 in (1.85 m)	180 lb (82 kg)	1993–07–12	UPHSD
F/C	12	(Philippines)	Prince Caperal	6 ft 7 in (2.01 m)	230 lb (104 kg)	1993–06–12	Arellano
F	14	(Philippines)	Kevin Ferrer	6 ft 4 in (1.93 m)	188 lb (85 kg)	1993–03–26	UST
G/F	16	(Philippines)	Jeff Chan	6 ft 2 in (1.88 m)	185 lb (84 kg)	1983–02–11	Far Eastern
F	18	(Philippines)	Arthur dela Cruz	6 ft 4 in (1.93 m)	210 lb (95 kg)	1992–05–09	San Beda
C	20	(United States)	Greg Slaughter	7 ft 0 in (2.13 m)	258 lb (117 kg)	1988–05–19	Ateneo
F/C	23	(Philippines)	Raymond Aguilar	6 ft 4 in (1.93 m)	200 lb (91 kg)	1985–07–27	National-U
F/C	25	(Philippines)	Japeth Aguilar	6 ft 9 in (2.06 m)	235 lb (107 kg)	1987–01–25	Western Kentucky
F	27	(Philippines)	Jervy Cruz (injured)	6 ft 4 in (1.93 m)	220 lb (100 kg)	1986–09–09	UST
F	31	(Philippines)	Aljon Mariano	6 ft 3 in (1.91 m)	175 lb (79 kg)	1992–08–03	UST
F	38	(United States)	Joe Devance	6 ft 7 in (2.01 m)	225 lb (102 kg)	1982–02–19	UTEP
G	47	(Philippines)	Mark Caguioa	6 ft 1 in (1.85 m)	185 lb (84 kg)	1979–11–19	Glendale CC (CA)
F/C	36	(United States)	Charles García (CI)	6 ft 10 in (2.08 m)	230 lb (104 kg)	1988–10–13	Seattle
F	32	(United States)	Justin Brownlee (CI / GI)	6 ft 6 in (1.98 m)	220 lb (100 kg)	1988–04–23	St. John's

Head coach

- (United States) Tim Cone

Assistant coach(es)

- (Philippines) Richard del Rosario (1st Assistant)
- (Philippines) Olsen Racela
- (Philippines) Freddie Abuda

Team manager

- (Philippines) Alfrancis Chua^{[a]}
- (Philippines) Raymond Rodriguez (Assistant)

Legend

- (C) Team captain
- (CI) Commissioner's Cup Import
- (GI) Governors' Cup Import
- (EI) EASL Import
- (DP) Unsigned draft pick
- (FA) Free agent
- (IN) Inactive
- (S) Suspended
- (R) Rookie
- Injured

- ^{a} Chua also serves as Barangay Ginebra's board governor.

== Philippine Cup ==
=== Eliminations ===
==== Standings ====
Pos	Team	W	L	PCT	GB	Qualification
1	San Miguel Beermen	8	3	.727 (Note: Head-to-head record: San Miguel 1–0 Magnolia)	—	Twice-to-beat in the quarterfinals
2	Magnolia Hotshots Pambansang Manok	8	3	.727	—	Twice-to-beat in the quarterfinals
3	Alaska Aces	7	4	.636	1	Best-of-three quarterfinals
4	Barangay Ginebra San Miguel	6	5	.545 (Note: Head-to-head quotient: Barangay Ginebra 1.03, Rain or Shine 1.02, NLEX 0.95)	2	Best-of-three quarterfinals
5	Rain or Shine Elasto Painters	6	5	.545	2	Best-of-three quarterfinals
6	NLEX Road Warriors	6	5	.545	2	Best-of-three quarterfinals
7	GlobalPort Batang Pier	5	6	.455 (Note: Head-to-head quotient: GlobalPort 1.14, Phoenix 1.00, TNT 0.97, Blackwater 0.89; 8th seed playoff: TNT 118–97 Phoenix)	3	Twice-to-win in the quarterfinals
8	TNT KaTropa	5	6	.455	3	Twice-to-win in the quarterfinals
9	Phoenix Fuel Masters	5	6	.455	3	
10	Blackwater Elite	5	6	.455	3	
11	Meralco Bolts	4	7	.364	4	
12	Kia Picanto	1	10	.091	7	

Source: PBA.ph
Rules for classification: 1) winning percentage; 2) if two teams are tied, head to head record; if three or more teams are tied, head-to-head goal average (quotient), if tied for 8th, one-game playoff; 3) overall quotient 4) coin toss

==== Game log ====
2017–18 PBA Philippine Cup game log
Total: 6–5
December: 1–0

Game	Date	Opponent	Score	High points	High rebounds	High assists	Location Attendance	Record
1	December 25	Magnolia	W 89–78	Greg Slaughter (24)	Greg Slaughter (12)	LA Tenorio (8)	Philippine Arena; 22,531	1–0

January: 2–3

Game	Date	Opponent	Score	High points	High rebounds	High assists	Location Attendance	Record
2	January 7	GlobalPort	W 104–97	Japeth Aguilar (21)	Cruz, Thompson (11)	Scottie Thompson (8)	Smart Araneta Coliseum; 9,000	2–0
3	January 12	Blackwater	L 77–94	Greg Slaughter (20)	Slaughter, Thompson (10)	LA Tenorio (6)	Mall of Asia Arena	2–1
4	January 21	Alaska	L 83–97	Aljon Mariano (15)	Aljon Mariano (9)	Scottie Thompson (5)	Ynares Center	2–2
5	January 26	Phoenix	L 82–87	Scottie Thompson (22)	Scottie Thompson (13)	LA Tenorio (5)	Smart Araneta Coliseum	2–3
6	January 28	San Miguel	W 100–96	J. Aguilar, Tenorio (23)	Scottie Thompson (10)	Scottie Thompson (8)	Smart Araneta Coliseum	3–3

February: 2–2

Game	Date	Opponent	Score	High points	High rebounds	High assists	Location Attendance	Record
7	February 3	NLEX	L 78–81	Japeth Aguilar (21)	Greg Slaughter (12)	Scottie Thompson (7)	Cuneta Astrodome	3–4
8	February 7	Kia	W 103–77	Greg Slaughter (14)	Scottie Thompson (14)	Scottie Thompson (7)	Mall of Asia Arena	4–4
9	February 11	TNT	W 93–78	LA Tenorio (27)	Greg Slaughter (14)	LA Tenorio (11)	Smart Araneta Coliseum	5–4
10	February 18	Meralco	L 82–84	Japeth Aguilar (20)	Scottie Thompson (13)	Scottie Thompson (5)	Philippine Arena	5–5

March: 1–0

Game	Date	Opponent	Score	High points	High rebounds	High assists	Location Attendance	Record
11	March 2	Rain or Shine	W 100–92 (3OT)	Japeth Aguilar (30)	Aguilar, Thompson (17)	Joe Devance (7)	Smart Araneta Coliseum	6–5

=== Playoffs ===
==== Bracket ====
Quarterfinals
(#1 twice-to-beat)
1	San Miguel	106
8	TNT	93
(Best-of-3)
4	Barangay Ginebra	2
5	Rain or Shine	0
(#2 twice-to-beat)
2	Magnolia	86
7	GlobalPort	79
(Best-of-3)
3	Alaska	0
6	NLEX	2

Semifinals (Best-of-7)
1	San Miguel	4
4	Barangay Ginebra	1
2	Magnolia	4
6	NLEX	2

Finals (Best-of-7)
1	San Miguel	4
2	Magnolia	1

==== Game log ====
2017–18 PBA Philippine Cup playoffs game log
Total: 3–4
Quarterfinals: 2–0

Game	Date	Opponent	Score	High points	High rebounds	High assists	Location Attendance	Series
1	March 5	Rain or Shine	W 88–80	LA Tenorio (18)	Scottie Thompson (15)	Scottie Thompson (7)	Mall of Asia Arena	1–0
2	March 7	Rain or Shine	W 99–91	Japeth Aguilar (27)	Japeth Aguilar (12)	Mercado, Thompson (6)	Smart Araneta Coliseum	2–0

Semifinals: 1–4

Game	Date	Opponent	Score	High points	High rebounds	High assists	Location Attendance	Series
1	March 9	San Miguel	L 90–102	J. Aguilar, Mercado, Thompson (17)	Aljon Mariano (9)	Kevin Ferrer (5)	Smart Araneta Coliseum	0–1
2	March 11	San Miguel	L 102–104 (OT)	Japeth Aguilar (26)	Scottie Thompson (9)	LA Tenorio (7)	Smart Araneta Coliseum	0–2
3	March 13	San Miguel	W 95–87	Japeth Aguilar (25)	Japeth Aguilar (12)	Scottie Thompson (6)	Mall of Asia Arena	1–2
4	March 15	San Miguel	L 81–102	Japeth Aguilar (31)	Japeth Aguilar (13)	Devance, Ferrer (5)	Mall of Asia Arena	1–3
5	March 17	San Miguel	L 94–100	Japeth Aguilar (34)	Scottie Thompson (16)	Scottie Thompson (16)	Cuneta Astrodome	1–4

== Commissioner's Cup ==
=== Eliminations ===
==== Standings ====
Pos	Team	W	L	PCT	GB	Qualification
1	Rain or Shine Elasto Painters	9	2	.818	—	Twice-to-beat in the quarterfinals
2	Alaska Aces	8	3	.727 (Note: Head-to-head record: Alaska 1–0 TNT)	1	Twice-to-beat in the quarterfinals
3	TNT KaTropa	8	3	.727	1	Best-of-three quarterfinals
4	Meralco Bolts	7	4	.636	2	Best-of-three quarterfinals
5	Barangay Ginebra San Miguel	6	5	.545 (Note: Head-to-head quotient: Barangay Ginebra 1.07, San Miguel 1.02, Magnolia 0.92)	3	Best-of-three quarterfinals
6	San Miguel Beermen	6	5	.545	3	Best-of-three quarterfinals
7	Magnolia Hotshots Pambansang Manok	6	5	.545	3	Twice-to-win in the quarterfinals
8	GlobalPort Batang Pier	5	6	.455	4	Twice-to-win in the quarterfinals
9	Columbian Dyip	4	7	.364 (Note: Head-to-head record: Columbian 1–0 Phoenix)	5	
10	Phoenix Fuel Masters	4	7	.364	5	
11	NLEX Road Warriors	2	9	.182	7	
12	Blackwater Elite	1	10	.091	8	

Source: PBA.ph
Rules for classification: 1) winning percentage; 2) if two teams are tied, head to head record; if three or more teams are tied, head-to-head goal average (quotient); 3) overall quotient 4) coin toss

==== Game log ====
2018 PBA Commissioner's Cup game log
Total: 6–5
April: 0–1

Game	Date	Opponent	Score	High points	High rebounds	High assists	Location Attendance	Record
1	April 29	Rain or Shine	L 89–108	Japeth Aguilar (28)	Japeth Aguilar (12)	Charles García (8)	Smart Araneta Coliseum	0–1

May: 1–2

Game	Date	Opponent	Score	High points	High rebounds	High assists	Location Attendance	Record
2	May 6	TNT	L 92–96	Aguilar, Devance (19)	Aguilar, García (9)	Scottie Thompson (4)	Mall of Asia Arena	0–2
3	May 11	Blackwater	W 105–91	Kevin Ferrer (21)	Aguilar, García (8)	Scottie Thompson (6)	Alonte Sports Arena	1–2
4	May 20	Phoenix	L 98–103 (2OT)	Japeth Aguilar (25)	Charles García (18)	LA Tenorio (8)	Smart Araneta Coliseum	1–3
All-Star Break

June: 4–2

Game	Date	Opponent	Score	High points	High rebounds	High assists	Location Attendance	Record
5	June 1	Meralco	L 82–93	Justin Brownlee (20)	Justin Brownlee (16)	Justin Brownlee (12)	Mall of Asia Arena	1–4
6	June 3	San Miguel	L 97–104 (OT)	Justin Brownlee (18)	Scottie Thompson (15)	Brownlee, Thompson (7)	Mall of Asia Arena	1–5
7	June 9	NLEX	W 93–85	Justin Brownlee (23)	Justin Brownlee (22)	Justin Brownlee (7)	Ibalong Centrum for Recreation	2–5
8	June 17	Magnolia	W 104–84	Justin Brownlee (35)	Greg Slaughter (14)	LA Tenorio (5)	Smart Araneta Coliseum	3–5
9	June 20	Columbian	W 134–107	Justin Brownlee (24)	Scottie Thompson (12)	Tenorio, Thompson (10)	Smart Araneta Coliseum	4–5
10	June 24	Alaska	W 105–86	Justin Brownlee (28)	Justin Brownlee (9)	Brownlee, Thompson (8)	Smart Araneta Coliseum	5–5

July: 1–0

Game	Date	Opponent	Score	High points	High rebounds	High assists	Location Attendance	Record
11	July 6	GlobalPort	W 116–98	Justin Brownlee (36)	Justin Brownlee (11)	Scottie Thompson (11)	Cuneta Astrodome	6–5

=== Playoffs ===
==== Bracket ====
Quarterfinals
(#1 twice-to-beat)
1	Rain or Shine	113	103
8	GlobalPort	114	97
(Best-of-3)
4	Meralco	0
5	Barangay Ginebra	2
(#2 twice-to-beat)
2	Alaska	89
7	Magnolia	78
(Best-of-3)
3	TNT	0
6	San Miguel	2

Semifinals (Best-of-5)
1	Rain or Shine	1
5	Barangay Ginebra	3
2	Alaska	1
6	San Miguel	3

finals (Best-of-7)
5	Barangay Ginebra	4
6	San Miguel	2

==== Game log ====
2018 PBA Commissioner's Cup playoffs game log
Total: 9–3
Quarterfinals: 2–0

Game	Date	Opponent	Score	High points	High rebounds	High assists	Location Attendance	Series
1	July 9	Meralco	W 88–81	Justin Brownlee (25)	Japeth Aguilar (10)	Justin Brownlee (6)	Smart Araneta Coliseum	1–0
2	July 11	Meralco	W 104–90	Justin Brownlee (36)	Greg Slaughter (10)	Justin Brownlee (9)	Smart Araneta Coliseum	2–0

Semifinals: 3–1

Game	Date	Opponent	Score	High points	High rebounds	High assists	Location Attendance	Series
1	July 15	Rain or Shine	W 102–89	Justin Brownlee (35)	Justin Brownlee (14)	Justin Brownlee (9)	Smart Araneta Coliseum	1–0
2	July 19	Rain or Shine	L 100–109	Justin Brownlee (29)	Justin Brownlee (12)	Mercado, Slaughter, Tenorio (4)	Smart Araneta Coliseum	1–1
3	July 21	Rain or Shine	W 75–72	Justin Brownlee (44)	Justin Brownlee (15)	Scottie Thompson (8)	Mall of Asia Arena	2–1
4	July 23	Rain or Shine	W 96–94	Devance, Slaughter (19)	Justin Brownlee (17)	Justin Brownlee (8)	Smart Araneta Coliseum	3–1

Finals: 4–2

Game	Date	Opponent	Score	High points	High rebounds	High assists	Location Attendance	Series
1	July 27	San Miguel	W 127–99	Justin Brownlee (42)	Brownlee, Slaughter (7)	Justin Brownlee (9)	Smart Araneta Coliseum; 11,883	1–0
2	July 29	San Miguel	L 109–134	Justin Brownlee (29)	Scottie Thompson (7)	LA Tenorio (7)	Smart Araneta Coliseum; 15,042	1–1
3	August 1	San Miguel	L 94–132	Justin Brownlee (32)	Justin Brownlee (11)	Mercado, Thompson (4)	Smart Araneta Coliseum	1–2
4	August 3	San Miguel	W 130–100	Justin Brownlee (37)	Justin Brownlee (11)	Scottie Thompson (8)	Smart Araneta Coliseum; 12,288	2–2
5	August 5	San Miguel	W 87–83	Scottie Thompson (20)	Greg Slaughter (13)	Joe Devance (6)	Smart Araneta Coliseum; 16,958	3–2
6	August 8	San Miguel	W 93–77	Justin Brownlee (31)	Justin Brownlee (19)	Justin Brownlee (7)	Mall of Asia Arena; 20,490	4–2

== Governors' Cup ==
=== Eliminations ===
==== Standings ====
Pos	Team	W	L	PCT	GB	Qualification
1	Barangay Ginebra San Miguel	9	2	.818	—	Twice-to-beat in quarterfinals
2	Phoenix Fuel Masters	8	3	.727 (Note: Head-to-head quotient: Phoenix 1.011, Alaska 1.006, Magnolia 0.982)	1	Twice-to-beat in quarterfinals
3	Alaska Aces	8	3	.727	1	Twice-to-beat in quarterfinals
4	Magnolia Hotshots Pambansang Manok	8	3	.727	1	Twice-to-beat in quarterfinals
5	Blackwater Elite	7	4	.636	2	Twice-to-win in quarterfinals
6	San Miguel Beermen	6	5	.545	3	Twice-to-win in quarterfinals
7	Meralco Bolts	5	6	.455 (Note: Head-to-head record: Meralco 1–0 NLEX)	4	Twice-to-win in quarterfinals
8	NLEX Road Warriors	5	6	.455	4	Twice-to-win in quarterfinals
9	TNT KaTropa	4	7	.364	5	
10	Rain or Shine Elasto Painters	3	8	.273	6	
11	NorthPort Batang Pier	2	9	.182	7	
12	Columbian Dyip	1	10	.091	8	

Source: PBA.ph
Rules for classification: 1) winning percentage; 2) if two teams are tied, head-to-head record; if three or more teams are tied, head-to-head goal average (quotient); 3) overall quotient 4) coin toss

==== Game log ====
2018 PBA Governors' Cup game log
Total: 9–2
August: 1–0

Game	Date	Opponent	Score	High points	High rebounds	High assists	Location Attendance	Record
1	August 31	Columbian	W 96–84	Justin Brownlee (34)	Justin Brownlee (20)	LA Tenorio (9)	Smart Araneta Coliseum	1–0

September: 4–1

Game	Date	Opponent	Score	High points	High rebounds	High assists	Location Attendance	Record
2	September 2	Alaska	W 109–101	Justin Brownlee (45)	Justin Brownlee (11)	Brownlee, Thompson (9)	Smart Araneta Coliseum	2–0
3	September 5	NorthPort	W 104–98	Justin Brownlee (27)	Scottie Thompson (14)	Justin Brownlee (8)	Smart Araneta Coliseum	3–0
4	September 21	Blackwater	L 118–124 (OT)	Justin Brownlee (41)	Scottie Thompson (11)	Scottie Thompson (7)	Smart Araneta Coliseum	3–1
5	September 23	San Miguel	W 110–102	Justin Brownlee (29)	Justin Brownlee (19)	Brownlee, Devance (7)	Smart Araneta Coliseum	4–1
6	September 29	Phoenix	W 101–99	Justin Brownlee (34)	Justin Brownlee (15)	Brownlee, Thompson (6)	Xavier University Gym	5–1

October: 3–1

Game	Date	Opponent	Score	High points	High rebounds	High assists	Location Attendance	Record
7	October 5	NLEX	W 106–92	Justin Brownlee (26)	Justin Brownlee (12)	Justin Brownlee (6)	Smart Araneta Coliseum	6–1
8	October 7	Meralco	W 111–105	Aguilar, Brownlee (31)	Scottie Thompson (11)	Scottie Thompson (12)	Sta. Rosa Multi-Purpose Complex	7–1
9	October 13	Rain or Shine	L 97–104	Justin Brownlee (23)	Justin Brownlee (16)	Justin Brownlee (9)	Quezon Convention Center	7–2
10	October 18	Magnolia	W 93–86	Justin Brownlee (29)	Justin Brownlee (12)	Justin Brownlee (7)	Smart Araneta Coliseum	8–2

November: 1–0

Game	Date	Opponent	Score	High points	High rebounds	High assists	Location Attendance	Record
11	November 4	TNT	W 112–93	Justin Brownlee (31)	Justin Brownlee (16)	Justin Brownlee (11)	Smart Araneta Coliseum	9–2

=== Playoffs ===
==== Bracket ====
Quarterfinals (Top 4 twice-to-beat)
1	Barangay Ginebra	111
8	NLEX	75
4	Magnolia	103
5	Blackwater	99
2	Phoenix	74	103
7	Meralco	90	108*
3	Alaska	96
6	San Miguel	85

Semifinals (Best-of-5)
1	Barangay Ginebra	1
4	Magnolia	3
7	Meralco	1
3	Alaska	3

Finals (Best-of-7)
4	Magnolia	4
3	Alaska	2

*Game went into overtime.

==== Game log ====
2018 PBA Governors' Cup playoffs game log
Total: 2–3
Quarterfinals: 1–0

Game	Date	Opponent	Score	High points	High rebounds	High assists	Location Attendance	Series
1	November 6	NLEX	W 111–75	Japeth Aguilar (18)	Aguilar, Brownlee (10)	Justin Brownlee (10)	Smart Araneta Coliseum	1–0

Semifinals: 1–3

Game	Date	Opponent	Score	High points	High rebounds	High assists	Location Attendance	Series
1	November 10	Magnolia	L 98–106	Justin Brownlee (37)	Justin Brownlee (14)	Justin Brownlee (8)	Ynares Center	0–1
2	November 12	Magnolia	L 97–101	Justin Brownlee (31)	Scottie Thompson (15)	Justin Brownlee (7)	Smart Araneta Coliseum	0–2
3	November 14	Magnolia	W 107–103	Justin Brownlee (46)	Justin Brownlee (19)	Brownlee, Devance, Tenorio, Thompson (5)	Smart Araneta Coliseum	1–2
4	November 16	Magnolia	L 108–112	Justin Brownlee (32)	Japeth Aguilar (14)	Scottie Thompson (8)	Ynares Center	1–3

== Transactions ==
=== Trades ===
==== Commissioner's Cup ====
June
June 18, 2018	To Barangay Ginebra Jeff Chan	To Phoenix 2018 First Round Draft Pick
June 19, 2018	To Barangay Ginebra Julian Sargent	To GlobalPort Paolo Taha

=== Recruited imports ===
Conference	Name	Country	Number	Debuted	Last game	Record
Commissioner's Cup	Charles García	(United States)	36	April 29 (vs. Rain or Shine)	May 20 (vs. Phoenix)	1–3
Commissioner's Cup	Justin Brownlee	(United States)	32	June 1 (vs. Meralco)	November 16 (vs. Magnolia)	25–10
Governors' Cup	Justin Brownlee	(United States)	32	June 1 (vs. Meralco)	November 16 (vs. Magnolia)	25–10

== Awards ==
Recipient	Award	Date awarded	Ref.
Greg Slaughter	Philippine Cup Player of the Week	January 10, 2018	
LA Tenorio	Commissioner's Cup Player of the Week	June 27, 2018	
Justin Brownlee	Commissioner's Cup Best Import of the Conference	August 3, 2018	
