= 2017–18 Alaska Aces season =

- Head coach: Alex Compton
- General manager: Dickie Bachmann
- Owner: Alaska Milk Corporation

Philippine Cup results
- Record: 7–4 (63.6%)
- Place: 3rd
- Playoff finish: Quarterfinalist (lost to NLEX, 0–2)

Commissioner's Cup results
- Record: 8–3 (72.7%)
- Place: 2nd
- Playoff finish: Semifinalist (lost to San Miguel, 1–3)

Governors' Cup results
- Record: 8–3 (72.7%)
- Place: 3rd
- Playoff finish: Runner-up (lost to Magnolia, 2–4)

Alaska Aces seasons

The 2017–18 Alaska Aces season was the 32nd season of the franchise in the Philippine Basketball Association (PBA).

== Key dates ==
=== 2017 ===
- October 29: The 2017 PBA draft took place in Midtown Atrium, Robinson Place Manila.

== Draft picks ==
Round	Pick	Player	Position	Nationality	PBA D-League team	College
1	5	Jeron Teng	F/G	Philippines	Flying V Thunder	La Salle
2	6	Davon Potts	G	United States	Cignal HD Hawkeyes	San Beda

== Roster ==
2017–18 Alaska Aces roster
Players
Coaches

Pos.	#	POB	Name	Height	Weight	DOB (YYYY–MM–DD)	From
G	0	(United States)	Simon Enciso	5 ft 11 in (1.80 m)	185 lb (84 kg)	1991–02–12	Notre Dame de Namur
G	4	(United States)	Chris Banchero	6 ft 1 in (1.85 m)	175 lb (79 kg)	1989–01–24	Seattle Pacific
C	7	(Papua New Guinea)	Sonny Thoss	6 ft 7 in (2.01 m)	205 lb (93 kg)	1981–12–07	James Cook
F/C	9	(Philippines)	Nonoy Baclao	6 ft 5 in (1.96 m)	190 lb (86 kg)	1987–06–15	Ateneo
F/C	10	(Philippines)	Marion Magat	6 ft 7 in (2.01 m)	180 lb (82 kg)	1989–10–22	National-U
F	11	(Philippines)	Jake Pascual	6 ft 4 in (1.93 m)	200 lb (91 kg)	1988–11–11	San Beda
G/F	12	(Philippines)	Jeron Teng (R)	6 ft 3 in (1.91 m)	185 lb (84 kg)	1994–03–21	De La Salle
F	13	(Philippines)	Ronald Pascual (IN)	6 ft 3 in (1.91 m)	190 lb (86 kg)	1988–06–23	San Sebastian
G	17	(Philippines)	Chris Exciminiano	6 ft 0 in (1.83 m)	185 lb (84 kg)	1988–11–17	Far Eastern
F	21	(Philippines)	Carl Bryan Cruz	6 ft 3 in (1.91 m)	179 lb (81 kg)	1991–08–21	Far Eastern
G	23	(United States)	Abel Galliguez	5 ft 9 in (1.75 m)	175 lb (79 kg)	1990–04–14	John Brown
G	26	(United States)	Davon Potts (R)	6 ft 2 in (1.88 m)	166 lb (75 kg)	1992–12–27	San Beda
F/C	32	(Philippines)	Yutien Andrada	6 ft 5 in (1.96 m)	203 lb (92 kg)	1990–11–18	De La Salle
G	42	(Philippines)	JVee Casio (C)	5 ft 10 in (1.78 m)	175 lb (79 kg)	1986–09–01	De La Salle
F	61	(Philippines)	Kevin Racal	6 ft 3 in (1.91 m)	175 lb (79 kg)	1991–05–16	Letran
F	87	(Philippines)	Vic Manuel	6 ft 4 in (1.93 m)	201 lb (91 kg)	1987–06–18	PSBA

Head coach

- (Philippines) Alex Compton

Assistant coach(es)

- (United States) Jeffrey Cariaso (1st Assistant)
- (Philippines) Eric Altamirano
- (Philippines) Franco Atienza
- (United States) Tony dela Cruz
- (Philippines) Monch Gavieres
- (Philippines) Danny Ildefonso
- (United States) Sean Chambers (Consultant)

Team manager

- (Philippines) Richard Bachmann^{[a]}

Legend

- (C) Team captain
- (CI) Commissioner's Cup Import
- (GI) Governors' Cup Import
- (EI) EASL Import
- (DP) Unsigned draft pick
- (FA) Free agent
- (IN) Inactive
- (S) Suspended
- (R) Rookie
- Injured

Roster

- ^{a} also serves as Alaska's board governor.

== Philippine Cup ==
=== Eliminations ===
==== Standings ====
Pos	Team	W	L	PCT	GB	Qualification
1	San Miguel Beermen	8	3	.727 (Note: Head-to-head record: San Miguel 1–0 Magnolia)	—	Twice-to-beat in the quarterfinals
2	Magnolia Hotshots Pambansang Manok	8	3	.727	—	Twice-to-beat in the quarterfinals
3	Alaska Aces	7	4	.636	1	Best-of-three quarterfinals
4	Barangay Ginebra San Miguel	6	5	.545 (Note: Head-to-head quotient: Barangay Ginebra 1.03, Rain or Shine 1.02, NLEX 0.95)	2	Best-of-three quarterfinals
5	Rain or Shine Elasto Painters	6	5	.545	2	Best-of-three quarterfinals
6	NLEX Road Warriors	6	5	.545	2	Best-of-three quarterfinals
7	GlobalPort Batang Pier	5	6	.455 (Note: Head-to-head quotient: GlobalPort 1.14, Phoenix 1.00, TNT 0.97, Blackwater 0.89; 8th seed playoff: TNT 118–97 Phoenix)	3	Twice-to-win in the quarterfinals
8	TNT KaTropa	5	6	.455	3	Twice-to-win in the quarterfinals
9	Phoenix Fuel Masters	5	6	.455	3	
10	Blackwater Elite	5	6	.455	3	
11	Meralco Bolts	4	7	.364	4	
12	Kia Picanto	1	10	.091	7	

Source: PBA.ph
Rules for classification: 1) winning percentage; 2) if two teams are tied, head to head record; if three or more teams are tied, head-to-head goal average (quotient), if tied for 8th, one-game playoff; 3) overall quotient 4) coin toss

==== Game log ====
2018 PBA Philippine Cup game log
Total: 7–4
December: 0–2

Game	Date	Opponent	Score	High points	High rebounds	High assists	Location Attendance	Record
1	December 20	Magnolia	L 95–108	Abueva, Manuel (20)	Calvin Abueva (15)	Chris Banchero (8)	Filoil Flying V Centre	0–1
2	December 29	TNT	L 98–106	Jeron Teng (28)	Jeron Teng (10)	Jeron Teng (5)	Cuneta Astrodome	0–2

January : 5–0

Game	Date	Opponent	Score	High points	High rebounds	High assists	Location Attendance	Record
3	January 10	Meralco	W 103–98	Abueva, Manuel (19)	Abueva, J. Pascual (9)	JVee Casio (4)	Smart Araneta Coliseum	1–2
4	January 14	Kia	W 102–65	Jeron Teng (23)	J. Pascual (11)	Banchero, Potts (5)	Smart Araneta Coliseum	2–2
5	January 21	Barangay Ginebra	W 97–83	Vic Manuel (18)	Calvin Abueva (9)	Banchero, Enciso (6)	Ynares Center	3–2
6	January 27	Blackwater	W 88–84	Banchero, Manuel (16)	Banchero, Cruz (7)	Simon Enciso (3)	Smart Araneta Coliseum	4–2
7	January 31	Phoenix	W 93–75	Chris Banchero (22)	Calvin Abueva (14)	Kevin Racal (6)	Mall of Asia Arena	5–2

February : 2–2

Game	Date	Opponent	Score	High points	High rebounds	High assists	Location Attendance	Record
8	February 4	GlobalPort	W 105–98 (OT)	Vic Manuel (21)	Calvin Abueva (12)	JVee Casio (5)	Ynares Center	6–2
9	February 11	NLEX	L 89–96	three players (12)	Carl Bryan Cruz (8)	Enciso, Exciminiano (4)	Smart Araneta Coliseum	6–3
10	February 17	San Miguel	L 96–109	JVee Casio (20)	Carl Bryan Cruz (12)	JVee Casio (6)	Batangas City Coliseum	6–4
11	February 23	Rain or Shine	W 99–95	JVee Casio (22)	Casio, Thoss (10)	JVee Casio (10)	Smart Araneta Coliseum	7–4

=== Playoffs ===
==== Bracket ====
Quarterfinals
(#1 twice-to-beat)
1	San Miguel	106
8	TNT	93
(Best-of-3)
4	Barangay Ginebra	2
5	Rain or Shine	0
(#2 twice-to-beat)
2	Magnolia	86
7	GlobalPort	79
(Best-of-3)
3	Alaska	0
6	NLEX	2

Semifinals (Best-of-7)
1	San Miguel	4
4	Barangay Ginebra	1
2	Magnolia	4
6	NLEX	2

Finals (Best-of-7)
1	San Miguel	4
2	Magnolia	1

==== Game log ====
2018 PBA Philippine Cup playoffs game log
Total: 0–2
Quarterfinals: 0–2

Game	Date	Opponent	Score	High points	High rebounds	High assists	Location Attendance	Series
1	March 5	NLEX	L 99–105	Chris Banchero (20)	Calvin Abueva (13)	Abueva, Casio, Thoss (3)	Mall of Asia Arena	0–1
2	March 7	NLEX	L 83–87	Calvin Abueva (17)	Calvin Abueva (16)	JVee Casio (6)	Smart Araneta Coliseum	0–2

== Commissioner's Cup ==
=== Eliminations ===
==== Standings ====
Pos	Team	W	L	PCT	GB	Qualification
1	Rain or Shine Elasto Painters	9	2	.818	—	Twice-to-beat in the quarterfinals
2	Alaska Aces	8	3	.727 (Note: Head-to-head record: Alaska 1–0 TNT)	1	Twice-to-beat in the quarterfinals
3	TNT KaTropa	8	3	.727	1	Best-of-three quarterfinals
4	Meralco Bolts	7	4	.636	2	Best-of-three quarterfinals
5	Barangay Ginebra San Miguel	6	5	.545 (Note: Head-to-head quotient: Barangay Ginebra 1.07, San Miguel 1.02, Magnolia 0.92)	3	Best-of-three quarterfinals
6	San Miguel Beermen	6	5	.545	3	Best-of-three quarterfinals
7	Magnolia Hotshots Pambansang Manok	6	5	.545	3	Twice-to-win in the quarterfinals
8	GlobalPort Batang Pier	5	6	.455	4	Twice-to-win in the quarterfinals
9	Columbian Dyip	4	7	.364 (Note: Head-to-head record: Columbian 1–0 Phoenix)	5	
10	Phoenix Fuel Masters	4	7	.364	5	
11	NLEX Road Warriors	2	9	.182	7	
12	Blackwater Elite	1	10	.091	8	

Source: PBA.ph
Rules for classification: 1) winning percentage; 2) if two teams are tied, head to head record; if three or more teams are tied, head-to-head goal average (quotient); 3) overall quotient 4) coin toss

==== Game log ====
2018 PBA Commissioner's Cup game log
Total: 8–3
April: 1–1

Game	Date	Opponent	Score	High points	High rebounds	High assists	Location Attendance	Record
1	April 27	Rain or Shine	L 103–109 (OT)	Antonio Campbell (40)	Antonio Campbell (20)	Jvee Casio (6)	Smart Araneta Coliseum	0–1
2	April 29	Blackwater	W 93–74	Vic Manuel (27)	Antonio Campbell (19)	Simon Enciso (7)	Smart Araneta Coliseum	1–1

May : 3–0

Game	Date	Opponent	Score	High points	High rebounds	High assists	Location Attendance	Record
3	May 4	Columbian	W 134–103	Vic Manuel (26)	Antonio Campbell (13)	Chris Banchero (13)	Smart Araneta Coliseum	2–1
4	May 13	TNT	W 110–100	Vic Manuel (29)	Antonio Campbell (20)	Chris Banchero (8)	Ynares Center	3–1
5	May 19	San Miguel	W 105–103	Vic Manuel (23)	Antonio Campbell (13)	Chris Banchero (9)	Lamberto Macias Sports and Cultural Center	4–1
All-Star Break

June : 3–2

Game	Date	Opponent	Score	High points	High rebounds	High assists	Location Attendance	Record
6	June 2	GlobalPort	W 109–103	Vic Manuel (22)	Antonio Campbell (18)	Chris Banchero (7)	Smart Araneta Coliseum	5–1
7	June 10	Magnolia	W 103–99	Vic Manuel (35)	Antonio Campbell (15)	Chris Banchero (5)	Smart Araneta Coliseum	6–1
8	June 15	NLEX	W 120–111	Antonio Campbell (28)	Vic Manuel (11)	Chris Banchero (7)	Mall of Asia Arena	7–1
9	June 17	Meralco	L 74–89	Antonio Campbell (25)	Antonio Campbell (14)	Chris Banchero (5)	Smart Araneta Coliseum	7–2
10	June 24	Barangay Ginebra	L 86–105	Vic Manuel (20)	Campbell, Magat (8)	Chris Banchero (4)	Smart Araneta Coliseum	7–3

July : 1–0

Game	Date	Opponent	Score	High points	High rebounds	High assists	Location Attendance	Record
11	July 6	Phoenix	W 114–91	Vic Manuel (28)	Diamon Simpson (19)	Banchero, Enciso (7)	Cuneta Astrodome	8–3

=== Playoffs ===
==== Bracket ====
Quarterfinals
(#1 twice-to-beat)
1	Rain or Shine	113	103
8	GlobalPort	114	97
(Best-of-3)
4	Meralco	0
5	Barangay Ginebra	2
(#2 twice-to-beat)
2	Alaska	89
7	Magnolia	78
(Best-of-3)
3	TNT	0
6	San Miguel	2

Semifinals (Best-of-5)
1	Rain or Shine	1
5	Barangay Ginebra	3
2	Alaska	1
6	San Miguel	3

finals (Best-of-7)
5	Barangay Ginebra	4
6	San Miguel	2

==== Game log ====
2018 PBA Commissioner's Cup playoffs game log
Total: 2–3
Quarterfinals: 1–0

Game	Date	Opponent	Score	High points	High rebounds	High assists	Location Attendance	Series
1	July 10	Magnolia	W 89–78	Vic Manuel (22)	Diamon Simpson (15)	Enciso, Simpson (4)	Smart Araneta Coliseum	1–0

Semifinals: 1–3

Game	Date	Opponent	Score	High points	High rebounds	High assists	Location Attendance	Series
1	July 14	San Miguel	L 79–92	Diamon Simpson (31)	Diamon Simpson (24)	JVee Casio (5)	Mall of Asia Arena	0–1
2	July 16	San Miguel	L 94–105	Enciso, Simpson (19)	Diamon Simpson (15)	Simon Enciso (6)	Smart Araneta Coliseum	0–2
3	July 20	San Miguel	W 125–104	Vic Manuel (24)	Diamon Simpson (13)	Simon Enciso (8)	Ynares Center	1–2
4	July 22	San Miguel	L 99–104	Diamon Simpson (24)	Diamon Simpson (21)	Simon Enciso (7)	Smart Araneta Coliseum	1–3

== Governors' Cup ==
=== Eliminations ===
==== Standings ====
Pos	Team	W	L	PCT	GB	Qualification
1	Barangay Ginebra San Miguel	9	2	.818	—	Twice-to-beat in quarterfinals
2	Phoenix Fuel Masters	8	3	.727 (Note: Head-to-head quotient: Phoenix 1.011, Alaska 1.006, Magnolia 0.982)	1	Twice-to-beat in quarterfinals
3	Alaska Aces	8	3	.727	1	Twice-to-beat in quarterfinals
4	Magnolia Hotshots Pambansang Manok	8	3	.727	1	Twice-to-beat in quarterfinals
5	Blackwater Elite	7	4	.636	2	Twice-to-win in quarterfinals
6	San Miguel Beermen	6	5	.545	3	Twice-to-win in quarterfinals
7	Meralco Bolts	5	6	.455 (Note: Head-to-head record: Meralco 1–0 NLEX)	4	Twice-to-win in quarterfinals
8	NLEX Road Warriors	5	6	.455	4	Twice-to-win in quarterfinals
9	TNT KaTropa	4	7	.364	5	
10	Rain or Shine Elasto Painters	3	8	.273	6	
11	NorthPort Batang Pier	2	9	.182	7	
12	Columbian Dyip	1	10	.091	8	

Source: PBA.ph
Rules for classification: 1) winning percentage; 2) if two teams are tied, head-to-head record; if three or more teams are tied, head-to-head goal average (quotient); 3) overall quotient 4) coin toss

==== Game log ====
2018 PBA Governors' Cup game log
Total: 8–3
August: 3–0

Game	Date	Opponent	Score	High points	High rebounds	High assists	Location Attendance	Record
1	August 24	Meralco	W 80–72	Mike Harris (23)	Mike Harris (15)	Chris Banchero (5)	Mall of Asia Arena	1–0
2	August 26	TNT	W 125–96	Simon Enciso (30)	Mike Harris (24)	Chris Banchero (14)	Smart Araneta Coliseum	2–0
3	August 29	Phoenix	W 108–97	Mike Harris (23)	Mike Harris (11)	Chris Banchero (9)	Smart Araneta Coliseum	3–0

September: 0–1

Game	Date	Opponent	Score	High points	High rebounds	High assists	Location Attendance	Record
4	September 2	Barangay Ginebra	L 101–109	Vic Manuel (28)	Mike Harris (19)	Chris Banchero (10)	Smart Araneta Coliseum	3–1

October: 5–2

Game	Date	Opponent	Score	High points	High rebounds	High assists	Location Attendance	Record
5	October 3	Rain or Shine	W 106–89	Mike Harris (39)	Mike Harris (25)	Chris Banchero (13)	Smart Araneta Coliseum	4–1
6	October 6	San Miguel	W 127–119	Mike Harris (36)	Mike Harris (23)	Chris Banchero (12)	Ynares Center	5–1
7	October 14	Magnolia	L 73–83	Mike Harris (24)	Mike Harris (25)	Chris Banchero (7)	Smart Araneta Coliseum	5–2
8	October 17	Columbian	W 104–94	Mike Harris (44)	Mike Harris (27)	Chris Banchero (11)	Cuneta Astrodome	6–2
9	October 21	Blackwater	W 116–109	Mike Harris (38)	Mike Harris (19)	JVee Casio (7)	Smart Araneta Coliseum	7–2
10	October 26	NLEX	L 110–116 (OT)	Mike Harris (35)	Mike Harris (26)	Chris Banchero (7)	Smart Araneta Coliseum	7–3
11	October 26	NorthPort	W 95–85	Mike Harris (27)	Mike Harris (25)	Banchero, Harris (5)	Smart Araneta Coliseum	8–3

=== Playoffs ===
==== Bracket ====
Quarterfinals (Top 4 twice-to-beat)
1	Barangay Ginebra	111
8	NLEX	75
4	Magnolia	103
5	Blackwater	99
2	Phoenix	74	103
7	Meralco	90	108*
3	Alaska	96
6	San Miguel	85

Semifinals (Best-of-5)
1	Barangay Ginebra	1
4	Magnolia	3
7	Meralco	1
3	Alaska	3

Finals (Best-of-7)
4	Magnolia	4
3	Alaska	2

*Game went into overtime.

==== Game log ====
2018 PBA Governors' Cup playoffs game log
Total: 5–5
Quarterfinals: 1–0

Game	Date	Opponent	Score	High points	High rebounds	High assists	Location Attendance	Series
1	November 7	San Miguel	W 96–85	Mike Harris (25)	Mike Harris (17)	Baclao, Casio, Enciso, Teng (3)	Cuneta Astrodome	1–0

Semifinals: 3–1

Game	Date	Opponent	Score	High points	High rebounds	High assists	Location Attendance	Series
1	November 11	Meralco	L 92–97	Mike Harris (37)	Mike Harris (18)	Chris Banchero (4)	Ynares Center	0–1
2	November 13	Meralco	W 100–95	Mike Harris (37)	Mike Harris (19)	Chris Banchero (8)	Mall of Asia Arena	1–1
3	November 15	Meralco	W 104–102	Mike Harris (31)	Mike Harris (24)	Mike Harris (7)	Cuneta Astrodome	2–1
4	November 17	Meralco	W 99–92	Mike Harris (27)	Mike Harris (14)	Banchero, Enciso, Harris, Teng (3)	Cuneta Astrodome	3–1

Finals: 2–4

Game	Date	Opponent	Score	High points	High rebounds	High assists	Location Attendance	Series
1	December 5	Magnolia	L 84–100	Mike Harris (20)	Mike Harris (15)	Chris Banchero (6)	Mall of Asia Arena	0–1
2	December 7	Magnolia	L 71–77	Mike Harris (22)	Mike Harris (13)	Simon Enciso (7)	Smart Araneta Coliseum	0–2
3	December 9	Magnolia	W 100–71	Mike Harris (36)	Mike Harris (18)	Chris Banchero (11)	Ynares Center	1–2
4	December 12	Magnolia	W 90–76	Mike Harris (34)	Mike Harris (22)	Banchero, Enciso (5)	Smart Araneta Coliseum	2–2
5	December 14	Magnolia	L 78–79	Mike Harris (28)	Mike Harris (20)	Chris Banchero (8)	Smart Araneta Coliseum	2–3
6	December 19	Magnolia	L 86–102	Mike Harris (26)	Mike Harris (24)	Simon Enciso (7)	Ynares Center	2–4

== Transactions ==
=== Trades ===
==== Preseason ====
December
December 15, 2017	To Alaska 2019 2nd round pick	To Phoenix Jaypee Mendoza

==== Governor's Cup ====
August
August 7, 2018	To Alaska Karl Dehesa; 2019 first round draft pick	To Phoenix Calvin Abueva

=== Recruited imports ===
Conference	Name	Country	Number	Debuted	Last game	Record
Commissioner's Cup	Antonio Campbell	(United States)	30	April 27 (vs. Rain or Shine)	June 24 (vs. Barangay Ginebra)	7–3
Commissioner's Cup	Diamon Simpson	(United States)	34	July 6 (vs. Phoenix)	July 22 (vs. San Miguel)	3–3
Governors' Cup	Mike Harris	(United States)	52	August 24 (vs. Meralco)	December 19 (vs. Magnolia)	14–8

== Awards ==
Recipient	Award	Date awarded	Ref.
Vic Manuel	Philippine Cup Player of the Week	February 5, 2018	
JVee Casio	Philippine Cup Player of the Week	February 27, 2018	
Vic Manuel	Commissioner's Cup Player of the Week	May 14, 2018	
Vic Manuel	Commissioner's Cup Player of the Week	June 12, 2018	
Simon Enciso	Governors' Cup Player of the Week	August 27, 2018	
Chris Banchero	Governors' Cup Player of the Week	October 22, 2018	
Mike Harris	Governors' Cup Best Import of the Conference	December 12, 2018	
