= 2017–18 Blackwater Elite season =

- Head coach: Leo Isaac (fired on April 30); Bong Ramos
- Owners: Ever Bilena Cosmetics, Inc.

Philippine Cup results
- Record: 5–6 (45.5%)
- Place: 10th
- Playoff finish: Did not qualify

Commissioner's Cup results
- Record: 1–10 (9.1%)
- Place: 12th
- Playoff finish: Did not qualify

Governors' Cup results
- Record: 7–4 (63.6%)
- Place: 5th
- Playoff finish: Quarterfinalist (lost to Magnolia with twice-to-win disadvantage)

Blackwater Elite seasons

The 2017–18 Blackwater Elite season was the 4th season of the franchise in the Philippine Basketball Association (PBA).

== Key dates ==
=== 2017 ===
- October 29: The 2017 PBA draft took place in Midtown Atrium, Robinson Place Manila.

== Draft picks ==
Round	Pick	Player	Position	Nationality	PBA D-League team	College
1	3	Raymar Jose	F	Philippines	Cignal HD Hawkeyes	FEU
2	3	Emil Palma	G	Philippines	Tanduay Light Rhum Masters	UE
3	3	Ebrahim Enguio Lopez	SG	Indonesia	Marinerong Pilipino Skippers	UE
4	3	Kyle Neypes	F	Philippines	BDO – NU JAM Liner Racal Tile Masters	NU
5	3	Jhon Sumido	G	Philippines	Cobra Iron MenCebuana Lhuillier GemsMP Hotel Warriors	UE

== Roster ==
2017–18 Blackwater Elite roster
Players
Coaches

Pos.	#	POB	Name	Height	Weight	DOB (YYYY–MM–DD)	From
G	0	(United States)	Mike Cortez (C)	6 ft 0 in (1.83 m)	170 lb (77 kg)	1980–10–11	De La Salle
G	1	(United States)	Michael DiGregorio	6 ft 1 in (1.85 m)	185 lb (84 kg)	1990–12–12	McKendree
G	2	(Philippines)	Raphael Banal	6 ft 2 in (1.88 m)	190 lb (86 kg)	1992–10–28	Hope International
G	6	(Philippines)	Roi Sumang	5 ft 8 in (1.73 m)	155 lb (70 kg)	1990–12–12	UE
C	7	(Philippines)	Poy Erram	6 ft 8 in (2.03 m)	227 lb (103 kg)	1989–07–07	Ateneo
G	8	(Philippines)	Paul Zamar (R)	5 ft 10 in (1.78 m)	179 lb (81 kg)	1987–10–20	UE
G	9	(Philippines)	Mark Cruz	5 ft 6 in (1.68 m)	150 lb (68 kg)	1992–07–27	Letran
G	10	(Philippines)	John Pinto	5 ft 10 in (1.78 m)	195 lb (88 kg)	1990–10–15	Arellano
F	12	(Philippines)	Mac Belo	6 ft 4 in (1.93 m)	185 lb (84 kg)	1993–02–12	Far Eastern
F	15	(Philippines)	James Sena	6 ft 4 in (1.93 m)	225 lb (102 kg)	1988–08–31	José Rizal
G	16	(Philippines)	Renz Palma (R)	6 ft 0 in (1.83 m)		1993–01–03	UE
C	21	(Philippines)	Rabeh Al-Hussaini	6 ft 7 in (2.01 m)	220 lb (100 kg)	1988–08–11	Ateneo
G/F	22	(Philippines)	Allein Maliksi	6 ft 3 in (1.91 m)	180 lb (82 kg)	1987–09–18	UST
F	23	(Philippines)	Raymar Jose (R)	6 ft 4 in (1.93 m)	210 lb (95 kg)	1992–08–06	Far Eastern
F/C	28	(Philippines)	Chris Javier	6 ft 4 in (1.93 m)	200 lb (91 kg)	1992–12–06	UE
F	41	(Philippines)	Kyle Neypes (R)	6 ft 4 in (1.93 m)			National-U

Head coach

- (Philippines) Bong Ramos

Assistant coach(es)

- (Philippines) Aris Dimaunahan (1st Assistant)
- (Philippines) Junjie Ablan
- (Philippines) Patrick Aquino
- (Philippines) Joel Co
- (Philippines) Tylon Darjuan
- (Philippines) Benjie Sipin
- (United States) Vince Hizon (Consultant)

Team manager

- (Philippines) Joel Co

Legend

- (C) Team captain
- (CI) Commissioner's Cup Import
- (GI) Governors' Cup Import
- (EI) EASL Import
- (DP) Unsigned draft pick
- (FA) Free agent
- (IN) Inactive
- (S) Suspended
- (R) Rookie
- Injured

== Philippine Cup ==
=== Eliminations ===
==== Standings ====
Pos	Team	W	L	PCT	GB	Qualification
1	San Miguel Beermen	8	3	.727 (Note: Head-to-head record: San Miguel 1–0 Magnolia)	—	Twice-to-beat in the quarterfinals
2	Magnolia Hotshots Pambansang Manok	8	3	.727	—	Twice-to-beat in the quarterfinals
3	Alaska Aces	7	4	.636	1	Best-of-three quarterfinals
4	Barangay Ginebra San Miguel	6	5	.545 (Note: Head-to-head quotient: Barangay Ginebra 1.03, Rain or Shine 1.02, NLEX 0.95)	2	Best-of-three quarterfinals
5	Rain or Shine Elasto Painters	6	5	.545	2	Best-of-three quarterfinals
6	NLEX Road Warriors	6	5	.545	2	Best-of-three quarterfinals
7	GlobalPort Batang Pier	5	6	.455 (Note: Head-to-head quotient: GlobalPort 1.14, Phoenix 1.00, TNT 0.97, Blackwater 0.89; 8th seed playoff: TNT 118–97 Phoenix)	3	Twice-to-win in the quarterfinals
8	TNT KaTropa	5	6	.455	3	Twice-to-win in the quarterfinals
9	Phoenix Fuel Masters	5	6	.455	3	
10	Blackwater Elite	5	6	.455	3	
11	Meralco Bolts	4	7	.364	4	
12	Kia Picanto	1	10	.091	7	

Source: PBA.ph
Rules for classification: 1) winning percentage; 2) if two teams are tied, head to head record; if three or more teams are tied, head-to-head goal average (quotient), if tied for 8th, one-game playoff; 3) overall quotient 4) coin toss

==== Game log ====
2018 PBA Philippine Cup game log
Total: 5–6
December: 1–1

Game	Date	Opponent	Score	High points	High rebounds	High assists	Location Attendance	Record
1	December 22	Meralco	L 98–103	Jose, Maliksi (16)	John Paul Erram (10)	Roi Sumang (3)	Cuneta Astrodome	0–1
2	December 29	Rain or Shine	W 92–87	Mac Belo (25)	John Paul Erram (14)	John Pinto (7)	Cuneta Astrodome	1–1

January : 1–3

Game	Date	Opponent	Score	High points	High rebounds	High assists	Location Attendance	Record
3	January 12	Barangay Ginebra	W 94–77	Belo, Erram (22)	John Paul Erram (11)	Mike Cortez (4)	Mall of Asia Arena	2–1
4	January 17	TNT	L 83–92	John Paul Erram (20)	Mac Belo (13)	Belo, Cortez, DiGregorio (3)	Smart Araneta Coliseum	2–2
5	January 19	GlobalPort	L 76–101	Mac Belo (17)	Raymar Jose (12)	Raymar Jose (5)	Cuneta Astrodome	2–3
6	January 27	Alaska	L 84–88	Belo, DiGregorio (15)	John Paul Erram (21)	Roi Sumang (5)	Smart Araneta Coliseum	2–4

February : 3–2

Game	Date	Opponent	Score	High points	High rebounds	High assists	Location Attendance	Record
7	February 2	Magnolia	L 72–78	Mac Belo (25)	John Paul Erram (13)	John Paul Erram (3)	Mall of Asia Arena	2–5
8	February 9	San Miguel	W 106–96	Michael DiGregorio (26)	John Paul Erram (18)	Allein Maliksi (8)	Cuneta Astrodome	3–5
9	February 16	Kia	W 95–76	Michael DiGregorio (21)	John Paul Erram (14)	John Pinto (8)	Smart Araneta Coliseum	4–5
10	February 18	NLEX	L 90–93	Michael DiGregorio (16)	John Paul Erram (17)	Belo, Cruz, Erram, Pinto (3)	Philippine Arena	4–6
11	February 21	Phoenix	W 83–78	Belo, DiGregorio, Jose (14)	John Paul Erram (19)	DiGregorio, Erram, Pinto (4)	Smart Araneta Coliseum	5–6

== Commissioner's Cup ==
=== Eliminations ===
==== Standings ====
Pos	Team	W	L	PCT	GB	Qualification
1	Rain or Shine Elasto Painters	9	2	.818	—	Twice-to-beat in the quarterfinals
2	Alaska Aces	8	3	.727 (Note: Head-to-head record: Alaska 1–0 TNT)	1	Twice-to-beat in the quarterfinals
3	TNT KaTropa	8	3	.727	1	Best-of-three quarterfinals
4	Meralco Bolts	7	4	.636	2	Best-of-three quarterfinals
5	Barangay Ginebra San Miguel	6	5	.545 (Note: Head-to-head quotient: Barangay Ginebra 1.07, San Miguel 1.02, Magnolia 0.92)	3	Best-of-three quarterfinals
6	San Miguel Beermen	6	5	.545	3	Best-of-three quarterfinals
7	Magnolia Hotshots Pambansang Manok	6	5	.545	3	Twice-to-win in the quarterfinals
8	GlobalPort Batang Pier	5	6	.455	4	Twice-to-win in the quarterfinals
9	Columbian Dyip	4	7	.364 (Note: Head-to-head record: Columbian 1–0 Phoenix)	5	
10	Phoenix Fuel Masters	4	7	.364	5	
11	NLEX Road Warriors	2	9	.182	7	
12	Blackwater Elite	1	10	.091	8	

Source: PBA.ph
Rules for classification: 1) winning percentage; 2) if two teams are tied, head to head record; if three or more teams are tied, head-to-head goal average (quotient); 3) overall quotient 4) coin toss

==== Game log ====
2018 PBA Commissioner's Cup game log
Total: 1–10
April: 0–3

Game	Date	Opponent	Score	High points	High rebounds	High assists	Location Attendance	Record
1	April 22	Columbian	L 98–126	Jarrid Famous (35)	Jarrid Famous (22)	Roi Sumang (5)	Smart Araneta Coliseum	0–1
2	April 25	Phoenix	L 102–107	Roi Sumang (20)	Jarrid Famous (16)	Roi Sumang (5)	Smart Araneta Coliseum	0–2
3	April 29	Alaska	L 74–93	Jarrid Famous (27)	Jarrid Famous (21)	Erram, Pinto, Sumang (4)	Smart Araneta Coliseum	0–3

May : 0–4

Game	Date	Opponent	Score	High points	High rebounds	High assists	Location Attendance	Record
4	May 2	GlobalPort	L 106–117	Jarrid Famous (41)	Jarrid Famous (22)	Mac Belo (7)	Ynares Center	0–4
5	May 11	Barangay Ginebra	L 91–105	Jarrid Famous (25)	Jarrid Famous (17)	Roi Sumang (7)	Alonte Sports Arena	0–5
6	May 18	TNT	L 101–120	John Paul Erram (16)	Jarrid Famous (12)	Mike Cortez (7)	Smart Araneta Coliseum	0–6
All-Star Break
7	May 30	NLEX	L 89–93	Michael DiGregorio (25)	Henry Walker (15)	Allein Maliksi (4)	Smart Araneta Coliseum	0–7

June : 1–3

Game	Date	Opponent	Score	High points	High rebounds	High assists	Location Attendance	Record
8	June 6	Magnolia	W 86–84	John Paul Erram (19)	John Paul Erram (15)	John Pinto (5)	Smart Araneta Coliseum	1–7
9	June 8	Rain or Shine	L 94–104	Allein Maliksi (23)	Maliksi, Sena (7)	Pinto, Zamar (4)	Smart Araneta Coliseum	1–8
10	June 15	Meralco	L 75–102	Henry Walker (14)	Henry Walker (13)	Henry Walker (6)	Mall of Asia Arena	1–9

July : 0–1

Game	Date	Opponent	Score	High points	High rebounds	High assists	Location Attendance	Record
11	July 4	San Miguel	L 106–115	Henry Walker (26)	Henry Walker (12)	John Pinto (8)	Mall of Asia Arena	1–10

== Governors' Cup ==
=== Eliminations ===
==== Standings ====
Pos	Team	W	L	PCT	GB	Qualification
1	Barangay Ginebra San Miguel	9	2	.818	—	Twice-to-beat in quarterfinals
2	Phoenix Fuel Masters	8	3	.727 (Note: Head-to-head quotient: Phoenix 1.011, Alaska 1.006, Magnolia 0.982)	1	Twice-to-beat in quarterfinals
3	Alaska Aces	8	3	.727	1	Twice-to-beat in quarterfinals
4	Magnolia Hotshots Pambansang Manok	8	3	.727	1	Twice-to-beat in quarterfinals
5	Blackwater Elite	7	4	.636	2	Twice-to-win in quarterfinals
6	San Miguel Beermen	6	5	.545	3	Twice-to-win in quarterfinals
7	Meralco Bolts	5	6	.455 (Note: Head-to-head record: Meralco 1–0 NLEX)	4	Twice-to-win in quarterfinals
8	NLEX Road Warriors	5	6	.455	4	Twice-to-win in quarterfinals
9	TNT KaTropa	4	7	.364	5	
10	Rain or Shine Elasto Painters	3	8	.273	6	
11	NorthPort Batang Pier	2	9	.182	7	
12	Columbian Dyip	1	10	.091	8	

Source: PBA.ph
Rules for classification: 1) winning percentage; 2) if two teams are tied, head-to-head record; if three or more teams are tied, head-to-head goal average (quotient); 3) overall quotient 4) coin toss

==== Game log ====
2018 PBA Governors' Cup game log
Total: 7–4
August: 1–0

Game	Date	Opponent	Score	High points	High rebounds	High assists	Location Attendance	Record
1	August 24	TNT	W 104–98 (OT)	Allein Maliksi (28)	Henry Walker (14)	John Pinto (4)	Mall of Asia Arena	1–0

September: 3–1

Game	Date	Opponent	Score	High points	High rebounds	High assists	Location Attendance	Record
2	September 5	San Miguel	W 103–100	Henry Walker (35)	Henry Walker (17)	John Pinto (7)	Smart Araneta Coliseum	2–0
3	September 19	NorthPort	W 113–111	Henry Walker (24)	Henry Walker (15)	John Pinto (13)	Smart Araneta Coliseum	3–0
4	September 21	Barangay Ginebra	W 124–118 (OT)	Henry Walker (39)	John Paul Erram (11)	Henry Walker (9)	Smart Araneta Coliseum	4–0
5	September 26	NLEX	L 106–124	Roi Sumang (24)	Henry Walker (13)	Henry Walker (7)	Smart Araneta Coliseum	4–1

October: 3–2

Game	Date	Opponent	Score	High points	High rebounds	High assists	Location Attendance	Record
6	October 5	Meralco	W 94–91	Henry Walker (24)	Henry Walker (14)	Pinto, Sumang, Walker (3)	Smart Araneta Coliseum	5–1
7	October 7	Rain or Shine	W 99–93	Michael DiGregorio (17)	Henry Walker (14)	Henry Walker (12)	Sta. Rosa Multi-Purpose Complex	6–1
8	October 10	Magnolia	L 99–133	Henry Walker (27)	Henry Walker (18)	John Pinto (7)	Cuneta Astrodome	6–2
9	October 21	Alaska	L 109–116	Henry Walker (29)	Henry Walker (11)	Henry Walker (11)	Smart Araneta Coliseum	6–3
10	October 27	Columbian	W 120–99	Henry Walker (26)	Henry Walker (11)	John Pinto (5)	Alonte Sports Arena	7–3

November: 0–1

Game	Date	Opponent	Score	High points	High rebounds	High assists	Location Attendance	Record
11	November 4	Phoenix	L 91–97	Henry Walker (21)	John Paul Erram (14)	John Pinto (10)	Smart Araneta Coliseum	7–4

=== Playoffs ===
==== Bracket ====
Quarterfinals (Top 4 twice-to-beat)
1	Barangay Ginebra	111
8	NLEX	75
4	Magnolia	103
5	Blackwater	99
2	Phoenix	74	103
7	Meralco	90	108*
3	Alaska	96
6	San Miguel	85

Semifinals (Best-of-5)
1	Barangay Ginebra	1
4	Magnolia	3
7	Meralco	1
3	Alaska	3

Finals (Best-of-7)
4	Magnolia	4
3	Alaska	2

*Game went into overtime.

==== Game log ====
2018 PBA Governors' Cup playoffs game log
Total: 0–1
Quarterfinals: 0–1

Game	Date	Opponent	Score	High points	High rebounds	High assists	Location Attendance	Series
1	November 6	Magnolia	L 99–103	Henry Walker (18)	John Paul Erram (19)	Pinto, Walker (5)	Smart Araneta Coliseum	0–1

== Transactions ==
=== Free agents ===
Player	Contract length	Date signed	Former team
Mike Cortez	One-conference	December 4, 2017	GlobalPort Batang Pier
Paul Zamar	Not disclosed	May 2, 2018	Mono Vampire (ABL)

=== Trades ===
May
May 18, 2018	To Blackwater Rabeh Al-Hussaini	To NLEX Dave Marcelo

=== Recruited imports ===
Conference	Name	Country	Number	Debuted	Last game	Record
Commissioner's Cup	Jarrid Famous	(United States)	24	April 22 (vs. Columbian)	May 18 (vs. TNT)	0–6
Commissioner's Cup	Henry Walker	(United States)	88	May 30 (vs. NLEX)	November 6 (vs. Magnolia)	8–9
Governors' Cup	Henry Walker	(United States)	5	May 30 (vs. NLEX)	November 6 (vs. Magnolia)	8–9

== Awards ==
Recipient	Award	Date awarded	Ref.
Paul Zamar	Governors' Cup Player of the Week	October 10, 2018	
