= 2017–18 Phoenix Fuel Masters season =

- Head coach: Louie Alas
- Owner: Phoenix Petroleum Philippines, Inc.

Philippine Cup results
- Record: 5–6 (45.5%)
- Place: 9th
- Playoff finish: Did not qualify

Commissioner's Cup results
- Record: 4–7 (36.4%)
- Place: 10th
- Playoff finish: Did not qualify

Governors' Cup results
- Record: 8–3 (72.7%)
- Place: 2nd
- Playoff finish: Quarterfinalist (lost to Meralco with twice-to-beat advantage)

Phoenix Fuel Masters seasons

The 2017–18 Phoenix Fuel Masters season was the 3rd season of the franchise in the Philippine Basketball Association (PBA).

== Key dates ==
=== 2017 ===
- October 29: The 2017 PBA draft took place in Midtown Atrium, Robinson Place Manila.

== Draft picks ==
Round	Pick	Player	Position	Nationality	PBA D-League team	College
1	4	Jason Perkins	Forward	United States	Caida Tile Masters	De La Salle
1	8	Sidney Onwubere	Forward	Philippines	Racal Tile Masters	Emilio Aguinaldo
2	9	Jayson Grimaldo	Forward	Philippines	Victoria Sports Stallions; Racal Tile Masters	MLQU
2	11	Wilson Baltazar	Guard/forward	Philippines	Bread Story Smashing Bakers	Lyceum
3	4	Roldan Sara	Guard	Philippines	Team Batangas; Racal Tile Masters	San Beda
4	4	John Carlo Casiño	Guard	Philippines	Cafe France Bakers; CEU Scorpions	Centro Escolar

== Roster ==
2017–18 Phoenix Fuel Masters roster
Players
Coaches

Pos.	#	POB	Name	Height	Weight	DOB (YYYY–MM–DD)	From
G	1	(Philippines)	Mike Gamboa (R)	5 ft 6 in (1.68 m)	170 lb (77 kg)	1989–02–26	UP Diliman
G	2	(Philippines)	LA Revilla (C)	5 ft 8 in (1.73 m)	146 lb (66 kg)	1989–11–30	De La Salle
F	3	(United States)	Jason Perkins (R)	6 ft 4 in (1.93 m)	235 lb (107 kg)	1992–09–20	De La Salle
F	7	(Philippines)	JC Intal	6 ft 4 in (1.93 m)	185 lb (84 kg)	1983–11–18	Ateneo
F	8	(Hong Kong)	Joseph Eriobu	6 ft 4 in (1.93 m)	205 lb (93 kg)	1992–02–12	Mapúa
C	9	(Philippines)	Justin Chua	6 ft 6 in (1.98 m)	232 lb (105 kg)	1989–07–13	Ateneo
G	14	(Philippines)	Gelo Alolino	6 ft 0 in (1.83 m)	185 lb (84 kg)	1994–01–04	National-U
F/C	18	(Philippines)	Doug Kramer	6 ft 5 in (1.96 m)	235 lb (107 kg)	1983–07–10	Ateneo
F	20	(Philippines)	Jaypee Mendoza	6 ft 3 in (1.91 m)	188 lb (85 kg)	1990–11–09	San Beda
F	24	(Philippines)	Rey Guevarra	6 ft 3 in (1.91 m)	190 lb (86 kg)	1986–11–24	Letran
F	28	(United States)	Willy Wilson	6 ft 3 in (1.91 m)	215 lb (98 kg)	1980–01–30	De La Salle
G	31	(Philippines)	RJ Jazul	5 ft 11 in (1.80 m)	170 lb (77 kg)	1986–04–11	Letran
G/F	35	(Canada)	Matthew Wright	6 ft 4 in (1.93 m)	200 lb (91 kg)	1992–02–07	St. Bonaventure
F	88	(Philippines)	Calvin Abueva	6 ft 2 in (1.88 m)	209 lb (95 kg)	1988–02–04	San Sebastian

Head coach

- (Philippines) Louie Alas

Assistant coach(es)

- (Philippines) Topex Robinson (1st Assistant)
- (Philippines) Jon Jacinto
- (United States) Nic Belasco
- (Philippines) Kristofer Reyes
- (Philippines) Caesar Polhen
- (Philippines) Carmelo Alas

Team manager

- (Philippines) Paolo Bugia

Legend

- (C) Team captain
- (CI) Commissioner's Cup Import
- (GI) Governors' Cup Import
- (EI) EASL Import
- (DP) Unsigned draft pick
- (FA) Free agent
- (IN) Inactive
- (S) Suspended
- (R) Rookie
- Injured

== Philippine Cup ==
=== Eliminations ===
==== Standings ====
Pos	Team	W	L	PCT	GB	Qualification
1	San Miguel Beermen	8	3	.727 (Note: Head-to-head record: San Miguel 1–0 Magnolia)	—	Twice-to-beat in the quarterfinals
2	Magnolia Hotshots Pambansang Manok	8	3	.727	—	Twice-to-beat in the quarterfinals
3	Alaska Aces	7	4	.636	1	Best-of-three quarterfinals
4	Barangay Ginebra San Miguel	6	5	.545 (Note: Head-to-head quotient: Barangay Ginebra 1.03, Rain or Shine 1.02, NLEX 0.95)	2	Best-of-three quarterfinals
5	Rain or Shine Elasto Painters	6	5	.545	2	Best-of-three quarterfinals
6	NLEX Road Warriors	6	5	.545	2	Best-of-three quarterfinals
7	GlobalPort Batang Pier	5	6	.455 (Note: Head-to-head quotient: GlobalPort 1.14, Phoenix 1.00, TNT 0.97, Blackwater 0.89; 8th seed playoff: TNT 118–97 Phoenix)	3	Twice-to-win in the quarterfinals
8	TNT KaTropa	5	6	.455	3	Twice-to-win in the quarterfinals
9	Phoenix Fuel Masters	5	6	.455	3	
10	Blackwater Elite	5	6	.455	3	
11	Meralco Bolts	4	7	.364	4	
12	Kia Picanto	1	10	.091	7	

Source: PBA.ph
Rules for classification: 1) winning percentage; 2) if two teams are tied, head to head record; if three or more teams are tied, head-to-head goal average (quotient), if tied for 8th, one-game playoff; 3) overall quotient 4) coin toss

==== Game log ====
2018 PBA Philippine Cup game log
Total: 5–6
December: 1–1

Game	Date	Opponent	Score	High points	High rebounds	High assists	Location Attendance	Record
1	December 17	San Miguel	L 96–104	Jeff Chan (18)	Doug Kramer (10)	Chan, Wright (4)	Smart Araneta Coliseum; 5,600	0–1
2	December 27	Kia	W 125–102	three players (15)	Kramer, Perkins (9)	Jason Perkins (6)	Ynares Center	1–1

January: 2–3

Game	Date	Opponent	Score	High points	High rebounds	High assists	Location Attendance	Record
3	January 7	NLEX	W 102–95	Matthew Wright (19)	Doug Kramer (11)	Matthew Wright (7)	Smart Araneta Coliseum; 9,000	2–1
4	January 17	Rain or Shine	L 99–120	Perkins, Wright (17)	Matthew Wright (7)	LA Revilla (5)	Smart Araneta Coliseum	2–2
5	January 20	Magnolia	L 91–97	Gelo Alolino (19)	four players (6)	LA Revilla (5)	Cuneta Astrodome	2–3
6	January 26	Barangay Ginebra	W 87–82	three players (19)	LA Revilla (11)	Chan, Revilla (6)	Smart Araneta Coliseum	3–3
7	January 31	Alaska	L 75–93	Matthew Wright (16)	Matthew Wright (11)	Revilla, Wright (5)	Mall of Asia Arena	3–4

February: 1–2

Game	Date	Opponent	Score	High points	High rebounds	High assists	Location Attendance	Record
8	February 7	TNT	W 74–72	Matthew Wright (16)	Jason Perkins (10)	Jeff Chan (6)	Mall of Asia Arena	4–4
9	February 14	Meralco	L 90–92	Willy Wilson (24)	Wilson, Wright (8)	Jeff Chan (3)	Smart Araneta Coliseum	4–5
10	February 21	Blackwater	L 78–83	Jason Perkins (17)	Doug Kramer (13)	Jeff Chan (8)	Smart Araneta Coliseum	4–6

March: 1–0

Game	Date	Opponent	Score	High points	High rebounds	High assists	Location Attendance	Record
11	March 2	GlobalPort	W 104–100	Matthew Wright (32)	Jason Perkins (10)	RJ Jazul (7)	Smart Araneta Coliseum	5–6

=== Playoffs ===
==== Bracket ====
Quarterfinals
(#1 twice-to-beat)
1	San Miguel	106
8	TNT	93
(Best-of-3)
4	Barangay Ginebra	2
5	Rain or Shine	0
(#2 twice-to-beat)
2	Magnolia	86
7	GlobalPort	79
(Best-of-3)
3	Alaska	0
6	NLEX	2

Semifinals (Best-of-7)
1	San Miguel	4
4	Barangay Ginebra	1
2	Magnolia	4
6	NLEX	2

Finals (Best-of-7)
1	San Miguel	4
2	Magnolia	1

==== Game log ====
2018 PBA Philippine Cup playoffs game log
Total: 0–1
8th seed playoff: 0–1

Game	Date	Opponent	Score	High points	High rebounds	High assists	Location Attendance	Series
1	March 4	TNT	L 97–118	Matthew Wright (18)	Kramer, Perkins (11)	Matthew Wright (6)	Smart Araneta Coliseum	0–1

== Commissioner's Cup ==
=== Eliminations ===
==== Standings ====
Pos	Team	W	L	PCT	GB	Qualification
1	Rain or Shine Elasto Painters	9	2	.818	—	Twice-to-beat in the quarterfinals
2	Alaska Aces	8	3	.727 (Note: Head-to-head record: Alaska 1–0 TNT)	1	Twice-to-beat in the quarterfinals
3	TNT KaTropa	8	3	.727	1	Best-of-three quarterfinals
4	Meralco Bolts	7	4	.636	2	Best-of-three quarterfinals
5	Barangay Ginebra San Miguel	6	5	.545 (Note: Head-to-head quotient: Barangay Ginebra 1.07, San Miguel 1.02, Magnolia 0.92)	3	Best-of-three quarterfinals
6	San Miguel Beermen	6	5	.545	3	Best-of-three quarterfinals
7	Magnolia Hotshots Pambansang Manok	6	5	.545	3	Twice-to-win in the quarterfinals
8	GlobalPort Batang Pier	5	6	.455	4	Twice-to-win in the quarterfinals
9	Columbian Dyip	4	7	.364 (Note: Head-to-head record: Columbian 1–0 Phoenix)	5	
10	Phoenix Fuel Masters	4	7	.364	5	
11	NLEX Road Warriors	2	9	.182	7	
12	Blackwater Elite	1	10	.091	8	

Source: PBA.ph
Rules for classification: 1) winning percentage; 2) if two teams are tied, head to head record; if three or more teams are tied, head-to-head goal average (quotient); 3) overall quotient 4) coin toss

==== Game log ====
2018 PBA Commissioner's Cup game log
Total: 4–7
April: 1–1

Game	Date	Opponent	Score	High points	High rebounds	High assists	Location Attendance	Record
1	April 25	Blackwater	W 107–102	James White (31)	James White (14)	Matthew Wright (8)	Smart Araneta Coliseum	1–0
2	April 28	TNT	L 98–106	James White (32)	James White (11)	Matthew Wright (7)	Ynares Center	1–1

May: 2–2

Game	Date	Opponent	Score	High points	High rebounds	High assists	Location Attendance	Record
3	May 6	Magnolia	W 89–87	White, Wright (19)	James White (17)	Matthew Wright (8)	Mall of Asia Arena	2–1
4	May 11	NLEX	L 115–120 (OT)	Matthew Wright (31)	Kramer, Perkins (12)	Jeff Chan (8)	Alonte Sports Arena	2–2
5	May 20	Barangay Ginebra	W 103–98 (2OT)	Eugene Phelps (25)	Eugene Phelps (14)	Eugene Phelps (7)	Smart Araneta Coliseum	3–2
All-Star Break
6	May 30	San Miguel	L 94–106	Eugene Phelps (33)	Eugene Phelps (17)	Jeff Chan (9)	Smart Araneta Coliseum	3–3

June: 1–3

Game	Date	Opponent	Score	High points	High rebounds	High assists	Location Attendance	Record
7	June 8	Meralco	L 100–103 (OT)	Eugene Phelps (31)	Eugene Phelps (26)	Matthew Wright (6)	Smart Araneta Coliseum	3–4
8	June 10	Columbian	L 107–115	Eugene Phelps (34)	Eugene Phelps (22)	LA Revilla (7)	Smart Araneta Coliseum	3–5
9	June 16	Rain or Shine	L 106–108	Chan, Phelps (26)	Eugene Phelps (14)	Eugene Phelps (7)	Smart Araneta Coliseum	3–6
10	June 20	GlobalPort	W 135–108	Eugene Phelps (37)	Eugene Phelps (23)	Eugene Phelps (10)	Smart Araneta Coliseum	4–6

July: 0–1

Game	Date	Opponent	Score	High points	High rebounds	High assists	Location Attendance	Record
11	July 6	Alaska	L 91–114	Eugene Phelps (23)	Eugene Phelps (10)	Phelps, Revilla (5)	Cuneta Astrodome	4–7

== Governors' Cup ==
=== Eliminations ===
==== Standings ====
Pos	Team	W	L	PCT	GB	Qualification
1	Barangay Ginebra San Miguel	9	2	.818	—	Twice-to-beat in quarterfinals
2	Phoenix Fuel Masters	8	3	.727 (Note: Head-to-head quotient: Phoenix 1.011, Alaska 1.006, Magnolia 0.982)	1	Twice-to-beat in quarterfinals
3	Alaska Aces	8	3	.727	1	Twice-to-beat in quarterfinals
4	Magnolia Hotshots Pambansang Manok	8	3	.727	1	Twice-to-beat in quarterfinals
5	Blackwater Elite	7	4	.636	2	Twice-to-win in quarterfinals
6	San Miguel Beermen	6	5	.545	3	Twice-to-win in quarterfinals
7	Meralco Bolts	5	6	.455 (Note: Head-to-head record: Meralco 1–0 NLEX)	4	Twice-to-win in quarterfinals
8	NLEX Road Warriors	5	6	.455	4	Twice-to-win in quarterfinals
9	TNT KaTropa	4	7	.364	5	
10	Rain or Shine Elasto Painters	3	8	.273	6	
11	NorthPort Batang Pier	2	9	.182	7	
12	Columbian Dyip	1	10	.091	8	

Source: PBA.ph
Rules for classification: 1) winning percentage; 2) if two teams are tied, head-to-head record; if three or more teams are tied, head-to-head goal average (quotient); 3) overall quotient 4) coin toss

==== Game log ====
2018 PBA Governors' Cup game log
Total: 8–3
August: 3–1

Game	Date	Opponent	Score	High points	High rebounds	High assists	Location Attendance	Record
1	August 22	Columbian	W 113–107	Eugene Phelps (50)	Eugene Phelps (17)	Matthew Wright (6)	Smart Araneta Coliseum	1–0
2	August 26	NorthPort	W 132–91	Eugene Phelps (30)	Eugene Phelps (15)	LA Revilla (11)	Smart Araneta Coliseum	2–0
3	August 29	Alaska	L 97–108	Eugene Phelps (27)	Eugene Phelps (24)	Matthew Wright (6)	Smart Araneta Coliseum	2–1
4	August 31	TNT	W 112–82	Jason Perkins (22)	Calvin Abueva (13)	Revilla, Wright (6)	Smart Araneta Coliseum	3–1

September: 2–1

Game	Date	Opponent	Score	High points	High rebounds	High assists	Location Attendance	Record
5	September 19	Meralco	W 96–86	Eugene Phelps (24)	Eugene Phelps (19)	Matthew Wright (5)	Smart Araneta Coliseum	4–1
6	September 23	Magnolia	W 95–82	Eugene Phelps (36)	Eugene Phelps (20)	Calvin Abueva (5)	Smart Araneta Coliseum	5–1
7	September 29	Barangay Ginebra	L 99–101	Matthew Wright (27)	Eugene Phelps (13)	LA Revilla (5)	Xavier University Gym	5–2

October: 2–1

Game	Date	Opponent	Score	High points	High rebounds	High assists	Location Attendance	Record
8	October 10	NLEX	W 123–97	Eugene Phelps (51)	Eugene Phelps (20)	Matthew Wright (7)	Cuneta Astrodome	6–2
9	October 12	San Miguel	L 100–117	Eugene Phelps (37)	Eugene Phelps (26)	Eugene Phelps (6)	Mall of Asia Arena	6–3
10	October 24	Rain or Shine	W 103–97	Abueva, Phelps (18)	Eugene Phelps (20)	Eugene Phelps (7)	Cuneta Astrodome	7–3

November: 1–0

Game	Date	Opponent	Score	High points	High rebounds	High assists	Location Attendance	Record
11	November 4	Blackwater	W 97–91	Calvin Abueva (25)	Eugene Phelps (19)	LA Revilla (6)	Smart Araneta Coliseum	8–3

=== Playoffs ===
==== Bracket ====
Quarterfinals (Top 4 twice-to-beat)
1	Barangay Ginebra	111
8	NLEX	75
4	Magnolia	103
5	Blackwater	99
2	Phoenix	74	103
7	Meralco	90	108*
3	Alaska	96
6	San Miguel	85

Semifinals (Best-of-5)
1	Barangay Ginebra	1
4	Magnolia	3
7	Meralco	1
3	Alaska	3

Finals (Best-of-7)
4	Magnolia	4
3	Alaska	2

*Game went into overtime.

==== Game log ====
2018 PBA Governors' Cup playoffs game log
Total: 0–2
Quarterfinals: 0–2

Game	Date	Opponent	Score	High points	High rebounds	High assists	Location Attendance	Series
1	November 7	Meralco	L 74–90	Eugene Phelps (27)	Eugene Phelps (17)	Jazul, Revilla (3)	Cuneta Astrodome	0–1
2	November 9	Meralco	L 103–108 (OT)	Jason Perkins (24)	Eugene Phelps (23)	Eugene Phelps (7)	Smart Araneta Coliseum	0–2

== Transactions ==
=== Free agent signings ===
Player	Contract length	Date signed	Former team
Rey Guevarra	One-conference	December 15, 2017	Kia Picanto

=== Trades ===
==== Preseason ====
November
November 6, 2017	To Phoenix 2018 second round pick (from TNT)	To NLEX Michael Miranda
November 9, 2017	To Phoenix Justin Chua JonJon Gabriel	To TNT Sidney Onwubere 2019 second round pick
November 15, 2017	To Phoenix LA Revilla	To Kia Jason Grimaldo; 2018 second round pick (from TNT)
December 15, 2017	To Phoenix Jaypee Mendoza	To Alaska 2019 second round pick

==== Commissioner's Cup ====
June
June 18, 2018	To Phoenix 2018 first round pick	To Ginebra Jeff Chan

==== Governor's Cup ====
August
August 7, 2018	To Phoenix Calvin Abueva	To Alaska Karl Dehesa; 2019 first round pick
December 13, 2018	To Phoenix Alex Mallari Dave Marcelo	To NLEX 2018 first round pick (#4) 2019 second round pick

=== Recruited imports ===
Conference	Name	Country	Number	Debuted	Last game	Record
Commissioner's Cup	James White	(United States)	33	April 25 (vs. Blackwater)	May 11 (vs. NLEX)	2–2
Commissioner's Cup	Eugene Phelps	(United States)	14	May 20 (vs. Barangay Ginebra)	November 9 (vs. Meralco)	10–10
Governors' Cup	Eugene Phelps	(United States)	14	May 20 (vs. Barangay Ginebra)	November 9 (vs. Meralco)	10–10

== Awards ==
Recipient	Award	Date awarded	Ref.
Willy Wilson	Philippine Cup Player of the Week	January 29, 2018	
