= 2017–18 Columbian Dyip season =

- Head coach: Chris Gavina (resigned on December 30); Ricky Dandan (resigned on June 26); Johnedel Cardel
- Owner: Columbian Autocar Corporation

Philippine Cup results
- Record: 1–10 (9.1%)
- Place: 12th
- Playoff finish: Did not qualify

Commissioner's Cup results
- Record: 4–7 (36.4%)
- Place: 9th
- Playoff finish: Did not qualify

Governors' Cup results
- Record: 1–10 (9.1%)
- Place: 12th
- Playoff finish: Did not qualify

Columbian Dyip seasons

The 2017–18 Columbian Dyip season was the 4th season of the franchise in the Philippine Basketball Association (PBA). The team was known as Kia Picanto for the Philippine Cup

== Key dates ==
=== 2017 ===
- October 29: The 2017 PBA draft took place in Midtown Atrium, Robinson Place Manila.

== Draft picks ==
Round	Pick	Player	Position	Nationality	PBA D-League team	College
3	1	Chris de Chavez	G	Philippines	Wang's Basketball Couriers	Ateneo
4	1	Arvie Bringas	F/C	Philippines	Hapee Fresh Fighters; Big Chill Super Chargers	FEU
5	1	Christian Geronimo	G	Philippines	none	PUP

== Roster ==
2017–18 Columbian Dyip roster
Players
Coaches

Pos.	#	POB	Name	Height	Weight	DOB (YYYY–MM–DD)	From
G	0	(Philippines)	Reden Celda	5 ft 11 in (1.80 m)	165 lb (75 kg)	1992–03–01	National-U
F	1	(Philippines)	Jackson Corpuz	6 ft 4 in (1.93 m)	195 lb (88 kg)	1989–02–08	Philippine Christian
G	2	(Philippines)	Carlo Lastimosa	6 ft 0 in (1.83 m)	182 lb (83 kg)	1990–09–03	St. Benilde
F	3	(Philippines)	Roider Cabrera	6 ft 2 in (1.88 m)	170 lb (77 kg)	1991–03–15	Adamson
F/C	4	(Philippines)	Jay-R Reyes	6 ft 7 in (2.01 m)	225 lb (102 kg)	1984–07–16	UP Diliman
F/C	6	(Philippines)	Jonjon Gabriel (R)	6 ft 6 in (1.98 m)	179 lb (81 kg)	1993–01–06	San Lorenzo
F/C	8	(Philippines)	Russel Escoto	6 ft 6 in (1.98 m)	210 lb (95 kg)	1992–12–04	Far Eastern
F	10	(Sweden)	Andreas Cahilig (R)	6 ft 5 in (1.96 m)			EARIST
G	11	(United States)	Rashawn McCarthy	6 ft 0 in (1.83 m)	175 lb (79 kg)	1989–09–10	SUNY–Old Westbury
F	13	(Philippines)	Eric Camson	6 ft 4 in (1.93 m)	228 lb (103 kg)	1990–05–12	Adamson
G	17	(Philippines)	Roldan Sara (R)	5 ft 8 in (1.73 m)			San Beda
F	24	(Philippines)	Glenn Khobuntin (C)	6 ft 4 in (1.93 m)	195 lb (88 kg)	1991–09–07	National-U
F	33	(Philippines)	Dylan Ababou	6 ft 3 in (1.91 m)	185 lb (84 kg)	1986–12–07	UST
G	35	(United States)	Jerramy King	5 ft 11 in (1.80 m)	165 lb (75 kg)	1990–09–26	Long Beach State
G/F	71	(Philippines)	Ronald Tubid	6 ft 1 in (1.85 m)	185 lb (84 kg)	1981–10–15	UE

Head coach

- (Philippines) Johnedel Cardel

Assistant coach(es)

- (Philippines) Emerson Colina
- (Philippines) Bert dela Rosa
- (Philippines) Arturo dela Cruz (Consultant)

Team manager

- (Philippines) Joe Lipa

Legend

- (C) Team captain
- (CI) Commissioner's Cup Import
- (GI) Governors' Cup Import
- (EI) EASL Import
- (DP) Unsigned draft pick
- (FA) Free agent
- (IN) Inactive
- (S) Suspended
- (R) Rookie
- Injured

Roster

== Philippine Cup ==
=== Eliminations ===
==== Standings ====
Pos	Team	W	L	PCT	GB	Qualification
1	San Miguel Beermen	8	3	.727 (Note: Head-to-head record: San Miguel 1–0 Magnolia)	—	Twice-to-beat in the quarterfinals
2	Magnolia Hotshots Pambansang Manok	8	3	.727	—	Twice-to-beat in the quarterfinals
3	Alaska Aces	7	4	.636	1	Best-of-three quarterfinals
4	Barangay Ginebra San Miguel	6	5	.545 (Note: Head-to-head quotient: Barangay Ginebra 1.03, Rain or Shine 1.02, NLEX 0.95)	2	Best-of-three quarterfinals
5	Rain or Shine Elasto Painters	6	5	.545	2	Best-of-three quarterfinals
6	NLEX Road Warriors	6	5	.545	2	Best-of-three quarterfinals
7	GlobalPort Batang Pier	5	6	.455 (Note: Head-to-head quotient: GlobalPort 1.14, Phoenix 1.00, TNT 0.97, Blackwater 0.89; 8th seed playoff: TNT 118–97 Phoenix)	3	Twice-to-win in the quarterfinals
8	TNT KaTropa	5	6	.455	3	Twice-to-win in the quarterfinals
9	Phoenix Fuel Masters	5	6	.455	3	
10	Blackwater Elite	5	6	.455	3	
11	Meralco Bolts	4	7	.364	4	
12	Kia Picanto	1	10	.091	7	

Source: PBA.ph
Rules for classification: 1) winning percentage; 2) if two teams are tied, head to head record; if three or more teams are tied, head-to-head goal average (quotient), if tied for 8th, one-game playoff; 3) overall quotient 4) coin toss

==== Game log ====
2018 PBA Philippine Cup game log
Total: 1–10
December: 0–2

Game	Date	Opponent	Score	High points	High rebounds	High assists	Location Attendance	Record
1	December 20	NLEX	L 115–119	Eric Camson (24)	Jay-R Reyes (12)	Celda, McCarthy (5)	Filoil Flying V Centre	0–1
2	December 27	Phoenix	L 102–125	Rashawn McCarthy (22)	Rashawn McCarthy (8)	Rashawn McCarthy (6)	Ynares Center	0–2

January : 1–4

Game	Date	Opponent	Score	High points	High rebounds	High assists	Location Attendance	Record
3	January 10	Magnolia	L 77–124	Jay-R Reyes (12)	Jackson Corpuz (13)	Rashawn McCarthy (5)	Smart Araneta Coliseum	0–3
4	January 14	Alaska	L 65–102	Rashawn McCarthy (16)	Mark Yee (8)	Rashawn McCarthy (4)	Smart Araneta Coliseum	0–4
5	January 20	Rain or Shine	W 98–94	Cabrera, McCarthy (14)	Mark Yee (8)	three players (4)	Cuneta Astrodome	1–4
6	January 24	Meralco	L 76–105	Rashawn McCarthy (17)	Rashawn McCarthy (12)	Glenn Khobuntin (4)	Smart Araneta Coliseum	1–5
7	January 31	TNT	L 85–90	Rashawn McCarthy (21)	Jackson Corpuz (8)	Rashawn McCarthy (7)	Mall of Asia Arena	1–6

February : 0–4

Game	Date	Opponent	Score	High points	High rebounds	High assists	Location Attendance	Record
8	February 7	Barangay Ginebra	L 77–103	Rashawn McCarthy (15)	Jackson Corpuz (7)	three players (2)	Mall of Asia Arena	1–7
9	February 16	Blackwater	L 76–95	Ronald Tubid (22)	McCarthy, Tubid (8)	Rashawn McCarthy (5)	Smart Araneta Coliseum	1–8
10	February 21	GlobalPort	L 91–108	Reden Celda (20)	Jonjon Gabriel (11)	Rashawn McCarthy (6)	Smart Araneta Coliseum	1–9
11	February 23	San Miguel	L 106–108	Glenn Khobuntin (15)	Mark Yee (8)	Rashawn McCarthy (6)	Smart Araneta Coliseum	1–10

== Commissioner's Cup ==
=== Eliminations ===
==== Standings ====
Pos	Team	W	L	PCT	GB	Qualification
1	Rain or Shine Elasto Painters	9	2	.818	—	Twice-to-beat in the quarterfinals
2	Alaska Aces	8	3	.727 (Note: Head-to-head record: Alaska 1–0 TNT)	1	Twice-to-beat in the quarterfinals
3	TNT KaTropa	8	3	.727	1	Best-of-three quarterfinals
4	Meralco Bolts	7	4	.636	2	Best-of-three quarterfinals
5	Barangay Ginebra San Miguel	6	5	.545 (Note: Head-to-head quotient: Barangay Ginebra 1.07, San Miguel 1.02, Magnolia 0.92)	3	Best-of-three quarterfinals
6	San Miguel Beermen	6	5	.545	3	Best-of-three quarterfinals
7	Magnolia Hotshots Pambansang Manok	6	5	.545	3	Twice-to-win in the quarterfinals
8	GlobalPort Batang Pier	5	6	.455	4	Twice-to-win in the quarterfinals
9	Columbian Dyip	4	7	.364 (Note: Head-to-head record: Columbian 1–0 Phoenix)	5	
10	Phoenix Fuel Masters	4	7	.364	5	
11	NLEX Road Warriors	2	9	.182	7	
12	Blackwater Elite	1	10	.091	8	

Source: PBA.ph
Rules for classification: 1) winning percentage; 2) if two teams are tied, head to head record; if three or more teams are tied, head-to-head goal average (quotient); 3) overall quotient 4) coin toss

==== Game log ====
2018 PBA Commissioner's Cup game log
Total: 4–7
April: 2–1

Game	Date	Opponent	Score	High points	High rebounds	High assists	Location Attendance	Record
1	April 22	Blackwater	W 126–98	Jerramy King (30)	C. J. Aiken (22)	Celda, McCarthy (6)	Smart Araneta Coliseum	1–0
2	April 25	Meralco	L 103–116	C. J. Aiken (21)	C. J. Aiken (18)	Rashawn McCarthy (6)	Smart Araneta Coliseum	1–1
3	April 28	NLEX	W 123–103	C. J. Aiken (28)	C. J. Aiken (10)	Rashawn McCarthy (12)	Ynares Center	2–1

May: 1–2

Game	Date	Opponent	Score	High points	High rebounds	High assists	Location Attendance	Record
4	May 4	Alaska	L 103–134	John Fields (39)	John Fields (16)	Rashawn McCarthy (7)	Smart Araneta Coliseum	2–2
5	May 9	Rain or Shine	W 104–96	John Fields (34)	John Fields (11)	Carlo Lastimosa (6)	Mall of Asia Arena	3–2
6	May 16	Magnolia	L 101–126	John Fields (22)	John Fields (19)	Jerramy King (4)	Smart Araneta Coliseum	3–3
All-Star Break

June: 1–4

Game	Date	Opponent	Score	High points	High rebounds	High assists	Location Attendance	Record
7	June 1	TNT	L 95–123	John Fields (34)	John Fields (20)	Rashawn McCarthy (6)	Mall of Asia Arena	3–4
8	June 6	San Miguel	L 117–129	Celda, McCarthy (19)	John Fields (22)	Reden Celda (10)	Mall of Asia Arena	3–5
9	June 10	Phoenix	W 115–107	John Fields (29)	John Fields (26)	Rashawn McCarthy (8)	Smart Araneta Coliseum	4–5
10	June 20	Barangay Ginebra	L 107–134	John Fields (30)	John Fields (16)	Jerramy King (8)	Smart Araneta Coliseum	4–6
11	June 22	GlobalPort	L 115–133	John Fields (26)	John Fields (23)	Rashawn McCarthy (9)	Smart Araneta Coliseum	4–7

== Governors' Cup ==
=== Eliminations ===
==== Standings ====
Pos	Team	W	L	PCT	GB	Qualification
1	Barangay Ginebra San Miguel	9	2	.818	—	Twice-to-beat in quarterfinals
2	Phoenix Fuel Masters	8	3	.727 (Note: Head-to-head quotient: Phoenix 1.011, Alaska 1.006, Magnolia 0.982)	1	Twice-to-beat in quarterfinals
3	Alaska Aces	8	3	.727	1	Twice-to-beat in quarterfinals
4	Magnolia Hotshots Pambansang Manok	8	3	.727	1	Twice-to-beat in quarterfinals
5	Blackwater Elite	7	4	.636	2	Twice-to-win in quarterfinals
6	San Miguel Beermen	6	5	.545	3	Twice-to-win in quarterfinals
7	Meralco Bolts	5	6	.455 (Note: Head-to-head record: Meralco 1–0 NLEX)	4	Twice-to-win in quarterfinals
8	NLEX Road Warriors	5	6	.455	4	Twice-to-win in quarterfinals
9	TNT KaTropa	4	7	.364	5	
10	Rain or Shine Elasto Painters	3	8	.273	6	
11	NorthPort Batang Pier	2	9	.182	7	
12	Columbian Dyip	1	10	.091	8	

Source: PBA.ph
Rules for classification: 1) winning percentage; 2) if two teams are tied, head-to-head record; if three or more teams are tied, head-to-head goal average (quotient); 3) overall quotient 4) coin toss

==== Game log ====
2018 PBA Governors' Cup game log
Total: 1–10
August: 0–4

Game	Date	Opponent	Score	High points	High rebounds	High assists	Location Attendance	Record
1	August 17	Meralco	L 106–109	Akeem Wright (30)	Akeem Wright (14)	Rashawn McCarthy (7)	Ynares Center	0–1
2	August 22	Phoenix	L 107–113	Jerramy King (27)	Akeem Wright (14)	Akeem Wright (6)	Smart Araneta Coliseum	0–2
3	August 29	NLEX	L 104–116	Akeem Wright (37)	Akeem Wright (17)	Akeem Wright (5)	Smart Araneta Coliseum	0–3
4	August 31	Barangay Ginebra	L 84–96	Rashawn McCarthy (18)	Akeem Wright (9)	Akeem Wright (5)	Smart Araneta Coliseum	0–4

September: 0–2

Game	Date	Opponent	Score	High points	High rebounds	High assists	Location Attendance	Record
5	September 2	TNT	L 114–118 (OT)	Jerramy King (26)	Russel Escoto (10)	Akeem Wright (9)	Smart Araneta Coliseum	0–5
6	September 21	San Miguel	L 119–143	Jackson Corpuz (28)	Jerramy King (14)	King, Wright (7)	Smart Araneta Coliseum	0–6

October: 1–4

Game	Date	Opponent	Score	High points	High rebounds	High assists	Location Attendance	Record
7	October 3	Magnolia	L 95–113	Jackson Corpuz (20)	Jackson Corpuz (9)	Rashawn McCarthy (7)	Smart Araneta Coliseum	0–7
8	October 6	NorthPort	L 101–118	Jerramy King (29)	Akeem Wright (11)	Akeem Wright (5)	Ynares Center	0–8
9	October 17	Alaska	L 94–104	Corpuz, Wright (19)	Akeem Wright (15)	Akeem Wright (9)	Cuneta Astrodome	0–9
10	October 19	Rain or Shine	W 100–84	Akeem Wright (23)	Akeem Wright (12)	Rashawn McCarthy (6)	Ynares Center	1–9
11	October 27	Blackwater	L 99–120	Akeem Wright (28)	Akeem Wright (10)	Ronald Tubid (6)	Alonte Sports Arena	1–10

== Transactions ==
=== Trades ===
==== Preseason ====
October
October 27, 2017	To Kia Ronald Tubid; Jay-R Reyes; Rashawn McCarthy; 2019 first round pick	To San Miguel 2017 first round pick
November
November 15, 2017	To Kia Jason Grimaldo; 2018 second round pick (from TNT)	To Phoenix LA Revilla

=== Free agency ===
==== Addition ====
Player	Number	Position	Date Signed	Notes
Dylan Ababou	33	Guard/forward	November 22, 2017	Signed after being released by Phoenix.

==== Subtraction ====
Player	Number	Position	Reason left	New Team
Jason Ballesteros	81	Center	Waived	Meralco Bolts
Josan Nimes	6	Guard/forward	Waived	—N/a
Jason Deutchman	14	Forward	Waived	—N/a
Nico Elorde	9	Point guard	Waived	GlobalPort

=== Recruited imports ===
Conference	Name	Country	Number	Debuted	Last game	Record
Commissioner's Cup	C. J. Aiken	(United States)	7	April 22 (vs. Blackwater)	April 28 (vs. NLEX)	2–1
Commissioner's Cup	John Fields	(United States)	32	May 4 (vs. Alaska)	June 22 (vs. GlobalPort)	2–6
Governors' Cup	Akeem Wright	(United States)	34	August 17 (vs. Meralco)	October 27 (vs. Blackwater)	1–10
