= 2017–18 Magnolia Hotshots Pambansang Manok season =

- Head coach: Chito Victolero
- Owners: San Miguel Pure Foods Company, Inc. (a San Miguel Corporation subsidiary)

Philippine Cup results
- Record: 8–3 (72.7%)
- Place: 2nd
- Playoff finish: Runner-up (lost to San Miguel, 1–4)

Commissioner's Cup results
- Record: 6–5 (54.5%)
- Place: 7th
- Playoff finish: Quarterfinalist (lost to Alaska with twice-to-win disadvantage)

Governors' Cup results
- Record: 8–3 (72.7%)
- Place: 4th
- Playoff finish: Champions (Defeated Alaska, 4–2)

Magnolia Hotshots Pambansang Manok seasons

The 2017–18 Magnolia Hotshots Pambansang Manok season was the 30th season of the franchise in the Philippine Basketball Association (PBA).

== Key dates ==
=== 2017 ===
- October 29: The 2017 PBA draft took place in Midtown Atrium, Robinson Place Manila.

== Draft picks ==
Round	Pick	Player	Position	Nationality	PBA D-League team	College
1	9	Lervin Flores	C	Philippines	Racal Tile Masters	Arellano
2	2	Joseph Gabayni	F/C	Philippines	Racal Tile Masters; Team Batangas	Lyceum
2	4	Julian Sargent	G/F	United States	AMA Titans; Marinerong Pilipino Skippers	La Salle
2	8	Gwyne Capacio	F	Philippines	Racal Tile Masters; Wang's Couriers	Ateneo
3	8	Thomas Torres	G	Philippines	Racal Motors; Flying V Thunder	La Salle

== Roster ==
2017–18 Magnolia Hotshots Pambansang Manok roster
Players
Coaches

Pos.	#	POB	Name	Height	Weight	DOB (YYYY–MM–DD)	From
G	2	(Philippines)	Justin Melton	5 ft 11 in (1.80 m)	163 lb (74 kg)	1987–04–07	Mount Olive
G	3	(Philippines)	Paul Lee	6 ft 0 in (1.83 m)	200 lb (91 kg)	1989–02–14	UE
C	4	(United States)	Rafi Reavis (C)	6 ft 8 in (2.03 m)	210 lb (95 kg)	1977–07–26	Coppin State
G	6	(Philippines)	Jio Jalalon	5 ft 9 in (1.75 m)	150 lb (68 kg)	1992–08–02	Arellano
G	8	(Philippines)	Peter June Simon	6 ft 0 in (1.83 m)	180 lb (82 kg)	1980–06–01	Mindanao
G/F	9	(United States)	Robbie Herndon	6 ft 3 in (1.91 m)	180 lb (82 kg)	1993–07–16	San Francisco State
F/C	10	(Philippines)	Ian Sangalang	6 ft 7 in (2.01 m)	212 lb (96 kg)	1991–12–20	San Sebastian
F	12	(Philippines)	Riego Gamalinda	6 ft 3 in (1.91 m)	184 lb (83 kg)	1986–05–25	San Beda
G/F	13	(Philippines)	Gryann Mendoza	6 ft 1 in (1.85 m)	180 lb (82 kg)	1990–09–09	Far Eastern
G	14	(Philippines)	Mark Barroca	5 ft 10 in (1.78 m)	170 lb (77 kg)	1986–04–25	Far Eastern
F	15	(Philippines)	Marc Pingris (injured)	6 ft 4 in (1.93 m)	210 lb (95 kg)	1981–10–16	PSBA
F/C	17	(Philippines)	Aldrech Ramos	6 ft 6 in (1.98 m)	190 lb (86 kg)	1988–04–03	Far Eastern
F	19	(United States)	Rome dela Rosa	6 ft 3 in (1.91 m)	185 lb (84 kg)	1990–12–11	San Beda
G	29	(Philippines)	Alvin Abundo	5 ft 8 in (1.73 m)	150 lb (68 kg)	1992–10–29	Centro Escolar
F/C	32	(United States)	Kyle Pascual	6 ft 6 in (1.98 m)	210 lb (95 kg)	1990–04–13	San Beda
F	91	(Philippines)	Rodney Brondial	6 ft 5 in (1.96 m)	210 lb (95 kg)	1990–11–20	Adamson

Head coach

- (Philippines) Chito Victolero

Assistant coach(es)

- (Philippines) Jason Webb (1st Assistant)
- (Philippines) Johnny Abarrientos
- (Philippines) Mon Jose
- (Philippines) Angelito Esguerra
- (Philippines) Tony Boy Espinosa
- (Philippines) Juno Sauler
- (Philippines) Paul Sorongon

Team manager

- (Philippines) Alvin Patrimonio

Legend

- (C) Team captain
- (CI) Commissioner's Cup Import
- (GI) Governors' Cup Import
- (EI) EASL Import
- (DP) Unsigned draft pick
- (FA) Free agent
- (IN) Inactive
- (S) Suspended
- (R) Rookie
- Injured

Roster

== Philippine Cup ==
=== Eliminations ===
==== Standings ====
Pos	Team	W	L	PCT	GB	Qualification
1	San Miguel Beermen	8	3	.727 (Note: Head-to-head record: San Miguel 1–0 Magnolia)	—	Twice-to-beat in the quarterfinals
2	Magnolia Hotshots Pambansang Manok	8	3	.727	—	Twice-to-beat in the quarterfinals
3	Alaska Aces	7	4	.636	1	Best-of-three quarterfinals
4	Barangay Ginebra San Miguel	6	5	.545 (Note: Head-to-head quotient: Barangay Ginebra 1.03, Rain or Shine 1.02, NLEX 0.95)	2	Best-of-three quarterfinals
5	Rain or Shine Elasto Painters	6	5	.545	2	Best-of-three quarterfinals
6	NLEX Road Warriors	6	5	.545	2	Best-of-three quarterfinals
7	GlobalPort Batang Pier	5	6	.455 (Note: Head-to-head quotient: GlobalPort 1.14, Phoenix 1.00, TNT 0.97, Blackwater 0.89; 8th seed playoff: TNT 118–97 Phoenix)	3	Twice-to-win in the quarterfinals
8	TNT KaTropa	5	6	.455	3	Twice-to-win in the quarterfinals
9	Phoenix Fuel Masters	5	6	.455	3	
10	Blackwater Elite	5	6	.455	3	
11	Meralco Bolts	4	7	.364	4	
12	Kia Picanto	1	10	.091	7	

Source: PBA.ph
Rules for classification: 1) winning percentage; 2) if two teams are tied, head to head record; if three or more teams are tied, head-to-head goal average (quotient), if tied for 8th, one-game playoff; 3) overall quotient 4) coin toss

==== Game log ====
2017–18 PBA Philippine Cup game log
Total: 8–3
December: 1–1

Game	Date	Opponent	Score	High points	High rebounds	High assists	Location Attendance	Record
1	December 20	Alaska	W 108–95	Paul Lee (30)	Ian Sangalang (10)	three players (6)	Filoil Flying V Centre	1–0
2	December 25	Barangay Ginebra	L 78–89	Ian Sangalang (25)	Ian Sangalang (11)	Mark Barroca (9)	Philippine Arena; 22,531	1–1

January: 4–0

Game	Date	Opponent	Score	High points	High rebounds	High assists	Location Attendance	Record
3	January 10	Kia	W 124–77	Justin Melton (23)	Ian Sangalang (9)	Justin Melton (8)	Smart Araneta Coliseum	2–1
4	January 14	NLEX	W 105–94	Paul Lee (21)	Marc Pingris (15)	Mark Barroca (8)	Smart Araneta Coliseum	3–1
5	January 20	Phoenix	W 97–91	Paul Lee (20)	Marc Pingris (17)	Marc Pingris (4)	Cuneta Astrodome	4–1
6	January 27	TNT	W 91–83	Mark Barroca (20)	Justin Melton (10)	Barroca, Jalalon (5)	Smart Araneta Coliseum	5–1

February: 3–2

Game	Date	Opponent	Score	High points	High rebounds	High assists	Location Attendance	Record
7	February 2	Blackwater	W 78–72	Barroca, Ramos (14)	Marc Pingris (12)	Marc Pingris (8)	Mall of Asia Arena	6–1
8	February 4	San Miguel	L 76–77	Mark Barroca (21)	Marc Pingris (14)	three players (4)	Ynares Center	6–2
9	February 10	Rain or Shine	L 95–101	Aldrech Ramos (27)	Rafi Reavis (11)	Jio Jalalon (8)	Calasiao Sports Complex	6–3
10	February 16	GlobalPort	W 96–81	Rome dela Rosa (18)	three players (6)	Justin Melton (5)	Smart Araneta Coliseum	7–3
11	February 24	Meralco	W 94–65	Paul Lee (21)	Marc Pingris (10)	Barroca, Pingris	Xavier University Gym	8–3

=== Playoffs ===
==== Bracket ====
Quarterfinals
(#1 twice-to-beat)
1	San Miguel	106
8	TNT	93
(Best-of-3)
4	Barangay Ginebra	2
5	Rain or Shine	0
(#2 twice-to-beat)
2	Magnolia	86
7	GlobalPort	79
(Best-of-3)
3	Alaska	0
6	NLEX	2

Semifinals (Best-of-7)
1	San Miguel	4
4	Barangay Ginebra	1
2	Magnolia	4
6	NLEX	2

Finals (Best-of-7)
1	San Miguel	4
2	Magnolia	1

==== Game log ====
2017–18 PBA Philippine Cup playoffs game log
Total: 6–6
Quarterfinals: 1–0

Game	Date	Opponent	Score	High points	High rebounds	High assists	Location Attendance	Series
1	March 6	GlobalPort	W 86–79	Mark Barroca (17)	Paul Lee (13)	Jio Jalalon (4)	Mall of Asia Arena	1–0

Semifinals: 4–2

Game	Date	Opponent	Score	High points	High rebounds	High assists	Location Attendance	Series
1	March 10	NLEX	L 87–88	Ian Sangalang (21)	Ian Sangalang (9)	Jio Jalalon (6)	Smart Araneta Coliseum	0–1
2	March 12	NLEX	W 99–84	Paul Lee (27)	Ian Sangalang (8)	Jio Jalalon (10)	Mall of Asia Arena	1–1
3	March 14	NLEX	W 106–99	Jio Jalalon (25)	Rafi Reavis (10)	Paul Lee (6)	Smart Araneta Coliseum	2–1
4	March 16	NLEX	L 79–91	Ian Sangalang (15)	Ian Sangalang (14)	Mark Barroca (7)	Mall of Asia Arena	2–2
5	March 18	NLEX	W 87–78	Mark Barroca (18)	Ian Sangalang (11)	Ian Sangalang (6)	Ynares Center	3–2
6	March 20	NLEX	W 96–89	Ian Sangalang (15)	Ian Sangalang (11)	Jio Jalalon (13)	Smart Araneta Coliseum	4–2

Finals: 1–4

Game	Date	Opponent	Score	High points	High rebounds	High assists	Location Attendance	Series
1	March 23	San Miguel	W 105–103	Ian Sangalang (29)	Reavis, Sangalang (9)	Barroca, Lee (5)	Smart Araneta Coliseum	1–0
2	March 25	San Miguel	L 77–92	Mark Barroca (18)	dela Rosa, Reavis 6	three players (3)	Mall of Asia Arena	1–1
3	April 1	San Miguel	L 87–111	Mark Barroca (22)	Rafi Reavis (14)	Paul Lee (7)	Smart Araneta Coliseum	1–2
4	April 4	San Miguel	L 80–84	Ian Sangalang (22)	Ian Sangalang (11)	Paul Lee (6)	Smart Araneta Coliseum	1–3
5	April 6	San Miguel	L 99–108 (2OT)	Paul Lee (21)	Rafi Reavis (12)	Mark Barroca (8)	Mall of Asia Arena	1–4

== Commissioner's Cup ==
=== Eliminations ===
==== Standings ====
Pos	Team	W	L	PCT	GB	Qualification
1	Rain or Shine Elasto Painters	9	2	.818	—	Twice-to-beat in the quarterfinals
2	Alaska Aces	8	3	.727 (Note: Head-to-head record: Alaska 1–0 TNT)	1	Twice-to-beat in the quarterfinals
3	TNT KaTropa	8	3	.727	1	Best-of-three quarterfinals
4	Meralco Bolts	7	4	.636	2	Best-of-three quarterfinals
5	Barangay Ginebra San Miguel	6	5	.545 (Note: Head-to-head quotient: Barangay Ginebra 1.07, San Miguel 1.02, Magnolia 0.92)	3	Best-of-three quarterfinals
6	San Miguel Beermen	6	5	.545	3	Best-of-three quarterfinals
7	Magnolia Hotshots Pambansang Manok	6	5	.545	3	Twice-to-win in the quarterfinals
8	GlobalPort Batang Pier	5	6	.455	4	Twice-to-win in the quarterfinals
9	Columbian Dyip	4	7	.364 (Note: Head-to-head record: Columbian 1–0 Phoenix)	5	
10	Phoenix Fuel Masters	4	7	.364	5	
11	NLEX Road Warriors	2	9	.182	7	
12	Blackwater Elite	1	10	.091	8	

Source: PBA.ph
Rules for classification: 1) winning percentage; 2) if two teams are tied, head to head record; if three or more teams are tied, head-to-head goal average (quotient); 3) overall quotient 4) coin toss

==== Game log ====
2018 PBA Commissioner's Cup game log
Total: 6–5
May: 3–1

Game	Date	Opponent	Score	High points	High rebounds	High assists	Location Attendance	Record
1	May 6	Phoenix	L 87–89	Vernon Macklin (25)	Vernon Macklin (17)	Jio Jalalon (7)	Mall of Asia Arena	0–1
2	May 12	GlobalPort	W 92–87	Ian Sangalang (22)	Vernon Macklin (13)	Mark Barroca (7)	Angeles University Foundation Sports Arena	1–1
3	May 16	Columbian	W 126–101	Vernon Macklin (19)	Jio Jalalon (9)	Paul Lee (8)	Smart Araneta Coliseum	2–1
4	May 18	Meralco	W 81–79	Vernon Macklin (21)	Vernon Macklin (15)	Paul Lee (6)	Smart Araneta Coliseum	3–1
All-Star Break

June: 1–4

Game	Date	Opponent	Score	High points	High rebounds	High assists	Location Attendance	Record
5	June 2	Rain or Shine	L 96–99 (OT)	dela Rosa, Kelly (19)	Curtis Kelly (15)	Jio Jalalon (7)	Smart Araneta Coliseum	3–2
6	June 6	Blackwater	L 84–86	Mark Barroca (16)	Curtis Kelly (9)	Jio Jalalon (7)	Smart Araneta Coliseum	3–3
7	June 10	Alaska	L 99–103	Jackson, Lee (21)	Justin Jackson (13)	Justin Jackson (6)	Smart Araneta Coliseum	3–4
8	June 13	TNT	W 111–89	Paul Lee (25)	Justin Jackson (19)	Justin Jackson (7)	Mall of Asia Arena	4–4
9	June 17	Barangay Ginebra	L 84–104	Justin Jackson (21)	Justin Jackson (15)	Justin Jackson (4)	Smart Araneta Coliseum	4–5

July: 2–0

Game	Date	Opponent	Score	High points	High rebounds	High assists	Location Attendance	Record
10	July 4	NLEX	W 116–89	Wayne Chism (27)	Wayne Chism (8)	Jio Jalalon (8)	Mall of Asia Arena	5–5
11	July 7	San Miguel	W 101–97	Wayne Chism (21)	Wayne Chism (14)	Justin Melton (7)	Smart Araneta Coliseum	6–5

=== Playoffs ===
==== Bracket ====
Quarterfinals
(#1 twice-to-beat)
1	Rain or Shine	113	103
8	GlobalPort	114	97
(Best-of-3)
4	Meralco	0
5	Barangay Ginebra	2
(#2 twice-to-beat)
2	Alaska	89
7	Magnolia	78
(Best-of-3)
3	TNT	0
6	San Miguel	2

Semifinals (Best-of-5)
1	Rain or Shine	1
5	Barangay Ginebra	3
2	Alaska	1
6	San Miguel	3

finals (Best-of-7)
5	Barangay Ginebra	4
6	San Miguel	2

==== Game log ====
2018 PBA Commissioner's Cup playoffs game log
Total: 0–1
Quarterfinals: 0–1

Game	Date	Opponent	Score	High points	High rebounds	High assists	Location Attendance	Series
1	July 10	Alaska	L 78–89	Wayne Chism (20)	Wayne Chism (15)	Mark Barroca (5)	Smart Araneta Coliseum	0–1

== Governors' Cup ==
=== Eliminations ===
==== Standings ====
Pos	Team	W	L	PCT	GB	Qualification
1	Barangay Ginebra San Miguel	9	2	.818	—	Twice-to-beat in quarterfinals
2	Phoenix Fuel Masters	8	3	.727 (Note: Head-to-head quotient: Phoenix 1.011, Alaska 1.006, Magnolia 0.982)	1	Twice-to-beat in quarterfinals
3	Alaska Aces	8	3	.727	1	Twice-to-beat in quarterfinals
4	Magnolia Hotshots Pambansang Manok	8	3	.727	1	Twice-to-beat in quarterfinals
5	Blackwater Elite	7	4	.636	2	Twice-to-win in quarterfinals
6	San Miguel Beermen	6	5	.545	3	Twice-to-win in quarterfinals
7	Meralco Bolts	5	6	.455 (Note: Head-to-head record: Meralco 1–0 NLEX)	4	Twice-to-win in quarterfinals
8	NLEX Road Warriors	5	6	.455	4	Twice-to-win in quarterfinals
9	TNT KaTropa	4	7	.364	5	
10	Rain or Shine Elasto Painters	3	8	.273	6	
11	NorthPort Batang Pier	2	9	.182	7	
12	Columbian Dyip	1	10	.091	8	

Source: PBA.ph
Rules for classification: 1) winning percentage; 2) if two teams are tied, head-to-head record; if three or more teams are tied, head-to-head goal average (quotient); 3) overall quotient 4) coin toss

==== Game log ====
2018 PBA Governors' Cup game log
Total: 8–3
August: 1–0

Game	Date	Opponent	Score	High points	High rebounds	High assists	Location Attendance	Record
1	August 22	NLEX	W 102–72	Romeo Travis (21)	Romeo Travis (13)	Jio Jalalon (9)	Smart Araneta Coliseum	1–0

September: 3–1

Game	Date	Opponent	Score	High points	High rebounds	High assists	Location Attendance	Record
2	September 1	NorthPort	W 104–87	Mark Barroca (20)	Romeo Travis (22)	Jio Jalalon (8)	Smart Araneta Coliseum	2–0
3	September 23	Phoenix	L 82–95	Romeo Travis (28)	Romeo Travis (19)	Jio Jalalon (5)	Smart Araneta Coliseum	2–1
4	September 26	Rain or Shine	W 92–76	Lee, Travis (28)	Romeo Travis (16)	Paul Lee (7)	Smart Araneta Coliseum	3–1
5	September 30	San Miguel	W 109–108	Paul Lee (28)	Romeo Travis (12)	Jio Jalalon (7)	Smart Araneta Coliseum	4–1

October: 4–2

Game	Date	Opponent	Score	High points	High rebounds	High assists	Location Attendance	Record
6	October 3	Columbian	W 113–95	Romeo Travis (32)	Romeo Travis (14)	Jio Jalalon (9)	Smart Araneta Coliseum	5–1
7	October 10	Blackwater	W 133–99	Romeo Travis (22)	Jalalon, Travis (12)	Jio Jalalon (13)	Cuneta Astrodome	6–1
8	October 14	Alaska	W 83–73	Romeo Travis (19)	Romeo Travis (17)	Jio Jalalon (5)	Smart Araneta Coliseum	7–1
9	October 19	Meralco	L 88–94	Romeo Travis (25)	Romeo Travis (19)	Jio Jalalon (6)	Ynares Center	7–2
10	October 26	TNT	W 116–103	Ian Sangalang (28)	Romeo Travis (15)	Paul Lee (8)	Ynares Center	8–2
11	October 28	Barangay Ginebra	L 86–93	Romeo Travis (30)	Sangalang, Travis (7)	Jio Jalalon (7)	Smart Araneta Coliseum	8–3

=== Playoffs ===
==== Bracket ====
Quarterfinals (Top 4 twice-to-beat)
1	Barangay Ginebra	111
8	NLEX	75
4	Magnolia	103
5	Blackwater	99
2	Phoenix	74	103
7	Meralco	90	108*
3	Alaska	96
6	San Miguel	85

Semifinals (Best-of-5)
1	Barangay Ginebra	1
4	Magnolia	3
7	Meralco	1
3	Alaska	3

Finals (Best-of-7)
4	Magnolia	4
3	Alaska	2

*Game went into overtime.

==== Game log ====
2018 PBA Governors' Cup playoffs game log
Total: 7–3
Quarterfinals: 1–0

Game	Date	Opponent	Score	High points	High rebounds	High assists	Location Attendance	Series
1	November 6	Blackwater	W 103–99	Paul Lee (22)	Romeo Travis (10)	Romeo Travis (12)	Smart Araneta Coliseum	1–0

Semifinals: 3–1

Game	Date	Opponent	Score	High points	High rebounds	High assists	Location Attendance	Series
1	November 10	Barangay Ginebra	W 106–98	Romeo Travis (37)	Romeo Travis (16)	Romeo Travis (5)	Ynares Center	1–0
2	November 12	Barangay Ginebra	W 101–97	Romeo Travis (25)	Romeo Travis (12)	Barroca, Travis (7)	Smart Araneta Coliseum	2–0
3	November 14	Barangay Ginebra	L 103–107	Mark Barroca (19)	Ian Sangalang (11)	Jio Jalalon (8)	Smart Araneta Coliseum	2–1
4	November 16	Barangay Ginebra	W 112–108	Romeo Travis (50)	Romeo Travis (13)	Ian Sangalang (6)	Ynares Center	3–1

Finals: 4–2

Game	Date	Opponent	Score	High points	High rebounds	High assists	Location Attendance	Series
1	December 5	Alaska	W 100–84	Romeo Travis (29)	Romeo Travis (13)	Jio Jalalon (9)	Mall of Asia Arena	1–0
2	December 7	Alaska	W 77–71	Romeo Travis (24)	Romeo Travis (9)	Jio Jalalon (7)	Smart Araneta Coliseum	2–0
3	December 9	Alaska	L 71–100	Romeo Travis (18)	Jio Jalalon (6)	Barroca, Travis (3)	Ynares Center	2–1
4	December 12	Alaska	L 76–90	Romeo Travis (29)	Romeo Travis (13)	Jio Jalalon (6)	Smart Araneta Coliseum	2–2
5	December 14	Alaska	W 79–78	Ian Sangalang (20)	Romeo Travis (17)	Romeo Travis (6)	Smart Araneta Coliseum	3–2
6	December 19	Alaska	W 102–86	Romeo Travis (32)	Romeo Travis (17)	Romeo Travis (6)	Ynares Center	4–2

== Transactions ==
=== Trades ===
==== Preseason ====
October
October 29, 2017	To Magnolia Draft rights to Robert Herndon; Draft rights to Gian Abrigo	To GlobalPort Draft rights to Lervin Flores; Draft rights to Joseph Gabayni; Draft rights to Julian Sargent

=== Recruited imports ===
Conference	Name	Country	Number	Debuted	Last game	Record
Commissioner's Cup	Vernon Macklin	(United States)	22	May 6 (vs. Phoenix)	May 18 (vs. Meralco)	3–1
Commissioner's Cup	Curtis Kelly	(United States)	74	June 2 (vs. Rain or Shine)	June 6 (vs. Blackwater)	0–2
Commissioner's Cup	Justin Jackson	(United States)	5	June 10 (vs. Alaska)	June 17 (vs. Barangay Ginebra)	1–2
Commissioner's Cup	Wayne Chism	(United States)	1	July 4 (vs. NLEX)	July 10 (vs. Alaska)	2–1
Governors' Cup	Romeo Travis	(United States)	24	August 22 (vs. NLEX)	December 19 (vs. Alaska)	16–6

== Awards ==
Recipient	Award	Date awarded	Ref.
Paul Lee	Philippine Cup Player of the Week	January 15, 2018	
Paul Lee	Commissioner's Cup Player of the Week	May 21, 2018	
Paul Lee	Governors' Cup Player of the Week	October 2, 2018	
Jio Jalalon	Governors' Cup Player of the Week	October 15, 2018	
Paul Lee	Governors' Cup Best Player of the Conference	December 12, 2018	
