= 2017–18 NorthPort Batang Pier season =

- Head coach: Pido Jarencio
- Owner(s): Sultan 900 Capital, Inc.

Philippine Cup results
- Record: 5–6 (45.5%)
- Place: 7th
- Playoff finish: Quarterfinalist (lost to Magnolia with twice-to-win disadvantage)

Commissioner's Cup results
- Record: 5–6 (45.5%)
- Place: 8th
- Playoff finish: Quarterfinalist (lost to Rain or Shine with twice-to-win disadvantage)

Governors' Cup results
- Record: 2–9 (18.2%)
- Place: 11th
- Playoff finish: Did not qualify

NorthPort Batang Pier seasons

The 2017–18 NorthPort Batang Pier season was the 6th season of the franchise in the Philippine Basketball Association (PBA). Prior to the Governor's Cup, the team was known as the GlobalPort Batang Pier.

== Key dates ==
=== 2017 ===
- October 29: The 2017 PBA draft took place in Midtown Atrium, Robinson Place Manila.

== Draft picks ==
Round	Pick	Player	Position	Nationality	PBA D-League team	College
1	6	Robbie Herndon	G	United States	Marinerong Pilipino Skippers	San Francisco State
2	24	Andreas Cahilig	F	Sweden	Cignal HD Hawkeyes	Earist
3	29	Zachary Nicholls	G	Canada	Victoria Sports Stallions	Arellano
4	5	Gian Abrigo	G	Philippines	Tanduay Light Rhum Masters; Racal Tile Masters	Adamson

== Roster ==
2017–18 NorthPort Batang Pier roster
Players
Coaches

Pos.	#	POB	Name	Height	Weight	DOB (YYYY–MM–DD)	From
G/F	0	(Philippines)	Paolo Taha	6 ft 0 in (1.83 m)	180 lb (82 kg)	1990–12–05	St. Benilde
G	3	(United States)	Stanley Pringle (C)	6 ft 1 in (1.85 m)	190 lb (86 kg)	1987–03–05	Penn State
F/C	7	(United States)	Moala Tautuaa	6 ft 8 in (2.03 m)	245 lb (111 kg)	1989–04–30	Chadron State
G	9	(Philippines)	Nico Elorde	5 ft 10 in (1.78 m)	155 lb (70 kg)	1991–10–04	Ateneo
F	10	(Canada)	Sean Anthony	6 ft 4 in (1.93 m)	200 lb (91 kg)	1986–01–26	McGill
G	11	(Philippines)	Jeric Fortuna	5 ft 8 in (1.73 m)	170 lb (77 kg)	1991–11–25	UST
G	13	(Philippines)	Paolo Javelona	6 ft 0 in (1.83 m)	170 lb (77 kg)	1992–10–25	National-U
G/F	14	(Philippines)	Jonathan Grey	6 ft 3 in (1.91 m)	190 lb (86 kg)	1992–01–13	St. Benilde
G	17	(Philippines)	Jeric Teng	6 ft 2 in (1.88 m)	175 lb (79 kg)	1991–03–18	UST
G	18	(Philippines)	Ryan Araña	6 ft 2 in (1.88 m)	180 lb (82 kg)	1984–03–23	De La Salle
F/C	26	(Philippines)	Lervin Flores (R)	6 ft 5 in (1.96 m)			Arellano
F	27	(Philippines)	Gabby Espinas	6 ft 4 in (1.93 m)	208 lb (94 kg)	1982–01–03	Philippine Christian
C	28	(Philippines)	Joseph Gabayni (R)	6 ft 5 in (1.96 m)			Lyceum
F/C	30	(Philippines)	Bradwyn Guinto	6 ft 6 in (1.98 m)	220 lb (100 kg)	1991–10–20	San Sebastian

Head coach

- (Philippines) Pido Jarencio

Assistant coach(es)

- (Philippines) Rensy Bajar (1st Assistant)
- (Philippines) Erwin Sta. Maria
- (United States) Joe Ward

Team manager

- (Philippines) Bonnie Tan
- (Philippines) Benjo Flores (Assistant)
- (Philippines) Walyip Chong (Assistant)

Legend

- (C) Team captain
- (CI) Commissioner's Cup Import
- (GI) Governors' Cup Import
- (EI) EASL Import
- (DP) Unsigned draft pick
- (FA) Free agent
- (IN) Inactive
- (S) Suspended
- (R) Rookie
- Injured

== Philippine Cup ==
=== Eliminations ===
==== Standings ====
Pos	Team	W	L	PCT	GB	Qualification
1	San Miguel Beermen	8	3	.727 (Note: Head-to-head record: San Miguel 1–0 Magnolia)	—	Twice-to-beat in the quarterfinals
2	Magnolia Hotshots Pambansang Manok	8	3	.727	—	Twice-to-beat in the quarterfinals
3	Alaska Aces	7	4	.636	1	Best-of-three quarterfinals
4	Barangay Ginebra San Miguel	6	5	.545 (Note: Head-to-head quotient: Barangay Ginebra 1.03, Rain or Shine 1.02, NLEX 0.95)	2	Best-of-three quarterfinals
5	Rain or Shine Elasto Painters	6	5	.545	2	Best-of-three quarterfinals
6	NLEX Road Warriors	6	5	.545	2	Best-of-three quarterfinals
7	GlobalPort Batang Pier	5	6	.455 (Note: Head-to-head quotient: GlobalPort 1.14, Phoenix 1.00, TNT 0.97, Blackwater 0.89; 8th seed playoff: TNT 118–97 Phoenix)	3	Twice-to-win in the quarterfinals
8	TNT KaTropa	5	6	.455	3	Twice-to-win in the quarterfinals
9	Phoenix Fuel Masters	5	6	.455	3	
10	Blackwater Elite	5	6	.455	3	
11	Meralco Bolts	4	7	.364	4	
12	Kia Picanto	1	10	.091	7	

Source: PBA.ph
Rules for classification: 1) winning percentage; 2) if two teams are tied, head to head record; if three or more teams are tied, head-to-head goal average (quotient), if tied for 8th, one-game playoff; 3) overall quotient 4) coin toss

==== Game log ====
2018 PBA Philippine Cup game log
Total: 5–6
December: 0–1

Game	Date	Opponent	Score	High points	High rebounds	High assists	Location Attendance	Record
1	December 25	NLEX	L 104–115	Stanley Pringle (33)	Kelly Nabong (14)	Stanley Pringle (4)	Philippine Arena; 22,531	0–1

January: 3–2

Game	Date	Opponent	Score	High points	High rebounds	High assists	Location Attendance	Record
2	January 7	Barangay Ginebra	L 97–104	Sean Anthony (29)	Kelly Nabong (11)	Stanley Pringle (10)	Smart Araneta Coliseum; 9,000	0–2
3	January 12	Rain or Shine	W 78–70	Stanley Pringle (29)	Anthony, Nabong (13)	Sean Anthony (12)	Mall of Asia Arena	1–2
4	January 19	Blackwater	W 101–76	Sean Anthony (22)	Stanley Pringle (11)	three players (5)	Cuneta Astrodome	2–2
5	January 24	San Miguel	L 93–107	Stanley Pringle (23)	Anthony, Guinto (7)	Ryan Araña (4)	Smart Araneta Coliseum	2–3
6	January 28	Meralco	W 107–88	Jonathan Grey (24)	Kelly Nabong (17)	Stanley Pringle (4)	Smart Araneta Coliseum	3–3

February: 2–2

Game	Date	Opponent	Score	High points	High rebounds	High assists	Location Attendance	Record
7	February 4	Alaska	L 98–105 (OT)	Stanley Pringle (28)	Sean Anthony (14)	Stanley Pringle (6)	Ynares Center	3–4
8	February 14	TNT	W 99–84	Nico Elorde (17)	Guinto, Pringle (10)	Nico Elorde (7)	Smart Araneta Coliseum	4–4
9	February 16	Magnolia	L 81–96	Kelly Nabong (21)	Anthony, Nabong (11)	Nico Elorde (6)	Smart Araneta Coliseum	4–5
10	February 21	Kia	W 108–91	Anthony, Nabong (21)	Kelly Nabong (13)	Nico Elorde (6)	Smart Araneta Coliseum	5–5

March: 0–1

Game	Date	Opponent	Score	High points	High rebounds	High assists	Location Attendance	Record
11	March 2	Phoenix	L 100–104	Terrence Romeo (20)	Yousef Taha (13)	Stanley Pringle (10)	Smart Araneta Coliseum	5–6

=== Playoffs ===
==== Bracket ====
Quarterfinals
(#1 twice-to-beat)
1	San Miguel	106
8	TNT	93
(Best-of-3)
4	Barangay Ginebra	2
5	Rain or Shine	0
(#2 twice-to-beat)
2	Magnolia	86
7	GlobalPort	79
(Best-of-3)
3	Alaska	0
6	NLEX	2

Semifinals (Best-of-7)
1	San Miguel	4
4	Barangay Ginebra	1
2	Magnolia	4
6	NLEX	2

Finals (Best-of-7)
1	San Miguel	4
2	Magnolia	1

==== Game log ====
2018 PBA Philippine Cup playoffs game log
Total: 0–1
Quarterfinals: 0–1

Game	Date	Opponent	Score	High points	High rebounds	High assists	Location Attendance	Series
1	March 6	Magnolia	L 79–86	Stanley Pringle (31)	Pringle, Taha (10)	Terrence Romeo (6)	Mall of Asia Arena	0–1

== Commissioner's Cup ==
=== Eliminations ===
==== Standings ====
Pos	Team	W	L	PCT	GB	Qualification
1	Rain or Shine Elasto Painters	9	2	.818	—	Twice-to-beat in the quarterfinals
2	Alaska Aces	8	3	.727 (Note: Head-to-head record: Alaska 1–0 TNT)	1	Twice-to-beat in the quarterfinals
3	TNT KaTropa	8	3	.727	1	Best-of-three quarterfinals
4	Meralco Bolts	7	4	.636	2	Best-of-three quarterfinals
5	Barangay Ginebra San Miguel	6	5	.545 (Note: Head-to-head quotient: Barangay Ginebra 1.07, San Miguel 1.02, Magnolia 0.92)	3	Best-of-three quarterfinals
6	San Miguel Beermen	6	5	.545	3	Best-of-three quarterfinals
7	Magnolia Hotshots Pambansang Manok	6	5	.545	3	Twice-to-win in the quarterfinals
8	GlobalPort Batang Pier	5	6	.455	4	Twice-to-win in the quarterfinals
9	Columbian Dyip	4	7	.364 (Note: Head-to-head record: Columbian 1–0 Phoenix)	5	
10	Phoenix Fuel Masters	4	7	.364	5	
11	NLEX Road Warriors	2	9	.182	7	
12	Blackwater Elite	1	10	.091	8	

Source: PBA.ph
Rules for classification: 1) winning percentage; 2) if two teams are tied, head to head record; if three or more teams are tied, head-to-head goal average (quotient); 3) overall quotient 4) coin toss

==== Game log ====
2018 PBA Commissioner's Cup game log
Total: 5–6
April: 1–1

Game	Date	Opponent	Score	High points	High rebounds	High assists	Location Attendance	Record
1	April 22	TNT	L 114–128	Sean Anthony (34)	Malcolm White (12)	Stanley Pringle (7)	Smart Araneta Coliseum	0–1
2	April 27	Meralco	W 86–85	Malcolm White (27)	Malcolm White (17)	four players (3)	Smart Araneta Coliseum	1–1

May: 2–2

Game	Date	Opponent	Score	High points	High rebounds	High assists	Location Attendance	Record
3	May 2	Blackwater	W 117–106	Sean Anthony (29)	Sean Anthony (13)	Sean Anthony (8)	Ynares Center	2–1
4	May 12	Magnolia	L 87–92	Sean Anthony (20)	Malcolm White (14)	Nico Elorde (5)	Angeles University Foundation Sports Arena	2–2
5	May 16	NLEX	W 116–94	Sean Anthony (21)	Malcolm White (14)	Stanley Pringle (8)	Smart Araneta Coliseum	3–2
6	May 20	Rain or Shine	L 90–96	Malcolm White (21)	Sean Anthony (14)	Nico Elorde (8)	Smart Araneta Coliseum	3–3
All-Star Break

June: 2–2

Game	Date	Opponent	Score	High points	High rebounds	High assists	Location Attendance	Record
7	June 2	Alaska	L 103–109	Malcolm White (27)	Anthony, White (8)	Elorde, Pringle (6)	Smart Araneta Coliseum	3–4
8	June 13	San Miguel	W 98–94	Malcolm White (25)	Malcolm White (10)	Stanley Pringle (8)	Mall of Asia Arena	4–4
9	June 20	Phoenix	L 108–135	Malcolm White (24)	Anthony, Pringle (7)	Nabong, Pringle (5)	Smart Araneta Coliseum	4–5
10	June 22	Columbian	W 133–115	Stanley Pringle (50)	Sean Anthony (17)	Anthony, Pringle (6)	Smart Araneta Coliseum	5–5

July: 0–1

Game	Date	Opponent	Score	High points	High rebounds	High assists	Location Attendance	Record
11	July 6	Barangay Ginebra	L 98–116	Malcolm White (19)	Malcolm White (9)	Stanley Pringle (7)	Cuneta Astrodome	5–6

=== Playoffs ===
==== Bracket ====
Quarterfinals
(#1 twice-to-beat)
1	Rain or Shine	113	103
8	GlobalPort	114	97
(Best-of-3)
4	Meralco	0
5	Barangay Ginebra	2
(#2 twice-to-beat)
2	Alaska	89
7	Magnolia	78
(Best-of-3)
3	TNT	0
6	San Miguel	2

Semifinals (Best-of-5)
1	Rain or Shine	1
5	Barangay Ginebra	3
2	Alaska	1
6	San Miguel	3

finals (Best-of-7)
5	Barangay Ginebra	4
6	San Miguel	2

==== Game log ====
2018 PBA Commissioner's Cup playoffs game log
Total: 1–1
Quarterfinals: 1–1

Game	Date	Opponent	Score	High points	High rebounds	High assists	Location Attendance	Series
1	July 10	Rain or Shine	W 114–113	Malcolm White (28)	Malcolm White (16)	Stanley Pringle (9)	Smart Araneta Coliseum	1–0
2	July 12	Rain or Shine	L 97–103	Stanley Pringle (23)	Malcolm White (10)	Stanley Pringle (8)	Mall of Asia Arena	1–1

== Governors' Cup ==
=== Eliminations ===
==== Standings ====
Pos	Team	W	L	PCT	GB	Qualification
1	Barangay Ginebra San Miguel	9	2	.818	—	Twice-to-beat in quarterfinals
2	Phoenix Fuel Masters	8	3	.727 (Note: Head-to-head quotient: Phoenix 1.011, Alaska 1.006, Magnolia 0.982)	1	Twice-to-beat in quarterfinals
3	Alaska Aces	8	3	.727	1	Twice-to-beat in quarterfinals
4	Magnolia Hotshots Pambansang Manok	8	3	.727	1	Twice-to-beat in quarterfinals
5	Blackwater Elite	7	4	.636	2	Twice-to-win in quarterfinals
6	San Miguel Beermen	6	5	.545	3	Twice-to-win in quarterfinals
7	Meralco Bolts	5	6	.455 (Note: Head-to-head record: Meralco 1–0 NLEX)	4	Twice-to-win in quarterfinals
8	NLEX Road Warriors	5	6	.455	4	Twice-to-win in quarterfinals
9	TNT KaTropa	4	7	.364	5	
10	Rain or Shine Elasto Painters	3	8	.273	6	
11	NorthPort Batang Pier	2	9	.182	7	
12	Columbian Dyip	1	10	.091	8	

Source: PBA.ph
Rules for classification: 1) winning percentage; 2) if two teams are tied, head-to-head record; if three or more teams are tied, head-to-head goal average (quotient); 3) overall quotient 4) coin toss

==== Game log ====
2018 PBA Governors' Cup game log
Total: 2–9
August: 0–2

Game	Date	Opponent	Score	High points	High rebounds	High assists	Location Attendance	Record
1	August 19	NLEX	L 107–123	Rashad Woods (42)	Tautuaa, Woods (12)	Rashad Woods (8)	Ynares Center	0–1
2	August 26	Phoenix	L 107–123	Rashad Woods (42)	Espinas, Tautuaa (8)	Nico Elorde (6)	Smart Araneta Coliseum	0–2

September: 0–4

Game	Date	Opponent	Score	High points	High rebounds	High assists	Location Attendance	Record
3	September 1	Magnolia	L 87–104	Rashad Woods (25)	Joseph Gabayni (9)	Moala Tautuaa (6)	Ynares Center	0–3
4	September 5	Barangay Ginebra	L 98–104	Stanley Pringle (34)	Rashad Woods (11)	Stanley Pringle (7)	Smart Araneta Coliseum	0–4
5	September 19	Blackwater	L 111–113	Rashad Woods (31)	Rashad Woods (17)	Sean Anthony (4)	Smart Araneta Coliseum	0–5
6	September 30	TNT	L 102–104	Rashad Woods (19)	Moala Tautuaa (14)	Stanley Pringle (9)	Smart Araneta Coliseum	0–6

October: 2–3

Game	Date	Opponent	Score	High points	High rebounds	High assists	Location Attendance	Record
7	October 6	Columbian	W 118–101	Pringle, Tautuaa (26)	Tautuaa, Woods (10)	Stanley Pringle (7)	Ynares Center	1–6
8	October 12	Meralco	W 99–94	Sean Anthony (26)	Pringle, Tautuaa (8)	Anthony, Pringle (3)	Mall of Asia Arena	2–6
9	October 17	Rain or Shine	L 98–120	Rashad Woods (30)	Sean Anthony (15)	Stanley Pringle (12)	Cuneta Astrodome	2–7
10	October 24	San Miguel	L 107–114	Sean Anthony (24)	Rashad Woods (15)	Stanley Pringle (5)	Cuneta Astrodome	2–8
11	October 28	Alaska	L 85–95	Rashad Woods (33)	Rashad Woods (13)	Nico Elorde (5)	Smart Araneta Coliseum	2–9

== Transactions ==
=== Trades ===
==== Preseason ====
October
October 29, 2017	To GlobalPort Draft rights to Lervin Flores; Draft rights to Joseph Gabayni; Draft rights to Julian Sargent	To Magnolia Draft rights to Robert Herndon; Draft rights to Gian Abrigo

==== Philippine Cup ====
April
April 3, 2018	To GlobalPort Mo Tautuaa; 2020 1st Round Pick; 2021 2nd Round Pick	To TNT Terrence Romeo; Yousef Taha

==== Commissioner's Cup ====
June
June 19, 2018	To GlobalPort Paolo Taha	To Ginebra Julian Sargent
June 21, 2018	To GlobalPort Gabby Espinas; 2020 second round draft pick	To San Miguel Kelly Nabong

=== Rookie Signings ===
Player	Number	Position	Date signed	Contract	School/club team
Lervin Flores	26	Forward/center	November 14	2 years	
Julian Sargent		Guard	November 14	2 years	DLSU
Joseph Gabayni	28	Forward/center	November 14	1 year	

=== Free agency ===
==== Addition ====
Country	Player	Number	Position	Contract	Date signed	Former Team
(Philippines)	Nico Elorde	9	PG	1 year	—	Kia Picanto
(Kuwait)	Yousef Taha	0	C	2 years	November 29, 2017	—
(United States)	Kelly Nabong	23	F/C	2 years	—	Meralco Bolts

==== Subtraction ====
Player	Number	Position	Reason left	New Team
Mike Cortez	11	Guard	Waived	Blackwater Elite
Billy Mamaril	2	Center	Waived	San Miguel Beermen
Rico Maierhofer	1	Forward	Waived	Tanduay Alab Pilipinas

=== Recruited imports ===
Conference	Name	Country	Number	Debuted	Last game	Record
Commissioner's Cup	Malcolm White	(United States)	5	April 22 (vs. TNT)	July 12 (vs. Rain or Shine)	6–7
Governors' Cup	Rashad Woods	(United States)	4	August 19 (vs. NLEX)	October 28 (vs. Alaska)	2–9

== Awards ==
Recipient	Award	Date awarded	Ref.
Stanley Pringle	Commissioner's Cup Player of the Week	June 19, 2018	
