= 2017–18 Meralco Bolts season =

- Head coach: Norman Black
- Owners: Manila Electric Company (an MVP Group subsidiary)

Philippine Cup results
- Record: 4–7 (36.4%)
- Place: 11th
- Playoff finish: Did not qualify

Commissioner's Cup results
- Record: 7–4 (63.6%)
- Place: 4th
- Playoff finish: Quarterfinalist (lost to Barangay Ginebra, 0–2)

Governors' Cup results
- Record: 5–6 (45.5%)
- Place: 7th
- Playoff finish: Semifinalist (lost to Alaska, 1–3)

Meralco Bolts seasons

The 2017–18 Meralco Bolts season was the 8th season of the franchise in the Philippine Basketball Association (PBA).

== Key dates ==
=== 2017 ===
- October 29: The 2017 PBA draft took place in Midtown Atrium, Robinson Place Manila.

== Draft picks ==
Round	Pick	Player	Position	Nationality	PBA D-League team	College
3	7	Jebb Bulawan	F	Philippines	Racal Tile Masters; Team Batangas	Lyceum

== Roster ==
2017–18 Meralco Bolts roster
Players
Coaches

Pos.	#	POB	Name	Height	Weight	DOB (YYYY–MM–DD)	From
F/C	0	(Philippines)	Bryan Faundo	6 ft 6 in (1.98 m)	225 lb (102 kg)	1984–02–18	Letran
G	6	(Philippines)	Mike Tolomia	5 ft 11 in (1.80 m)	170 lb (77 kg)	1993–01–06	Far Eastern
F	7	(United States)	Cliff Hodge	6 ft 4 in (1.93 m)	195 lb (88 kg)	1988–02–03	Reedley
F	8	(Philippines)	Nico Salva	6 ft 3 in (1.91 m)	194 lb (88 kg)	1990–03–08	Ateneo
G	9	(Philippines)	Baser Amer	6 ft 0 in (1.83 m)	170 lb (77 kg)	1992–09–29	San Beda
G/F	11	(United States)	Chris Newsome	6 ft 2 in (1.88 m)	190 lb (86 kg)	1990–06–25	Ateneo
F	12	(Philippines)	KG Canaleta	6 ft 6 in (1.98 m)	200 lb (91 kg)	1982–02–12	UE
G	13	(Philippines)	Garvo Lanete	6 ft 2 in (1.88 m)	180 lb (82 kg)	1989–02–13	San Beda
G	17	(Philippines)	Anjo Caram	5 ft 7 in (1.70 m)	159 lb (72 kg)	1991–01–14	San Beda
C	18	(Philippines)	Jason Ballesteros	6 ft 7 in (2.01 m)	220 lb (100 kg)	1985–10–07	San Sebastian
F	20	(United States)	Jared Dillinger	6 ft 4 in (1.93 m)	220 lb (100 kg)	1984–01–06	Hawaiʻi
F	21	(Philippines)	Reynel Hugnatan (C)	6 ft 4 in (1.93 m)	210 lb (95 kg)	1978–11–03	Manila
F/C	25	(Philippines)	Ken Bono	6 ft 5 in (1.96 m)	280 lb (127 kg)	1984–07–19	Adamson
F	33	(Philippines)	Ranidel de Ocampo	6 ft 6 in (1.98 m)	210 lb (95 kg)	1981–12–08	Saint Francis of Assisi
F	45	(Philippines)	Mac Baracael	6 ft 4 in (1.93 m)	205 lb (93 kg)	1985–04–14	Far Eastern
F	81	(Philippines)	Jammer Jamito	6 ft 5 in (1.96 m)	190 lb (86 kg)	1990–09–01	St. Clare

Head coach

- (United States) Norman Black

Assistant coach(es)

- (Philippines) Ronnie Magsanoc (1st Assistant)
- (Philippines) Gene Afable
- (Philippines) Patrick Fran
- (Philippines) Christopher Tan
- (Philippines) Xavier Nunag
- (Philippines) Luigi Trillo

Team manager

- (Philippines) Paolo Trillo

Legend

- (C) Team captain
- (CI) Commissioner's Cup Import
- (GI) Governors' Cup Import
- (EI) EASL Import
- (DP) Unsigned draft pick
- (FA) Free agent
- (IN) Inactive
- (S) Suspended
- (R) Rookie
- Injured

== Philippine Cup ==
=== Eliminations ===
==== Standings ====
Pos	Team	W	L	PCT	GB	Qualification
1	San Miguel Beermen	8	3	.727 (Note: Head-to-head record: San Miguel 1–0 Magnolia)	—	Twice-to-beat in the quarterfinals
2	Magnolia Hotshots Pambansang Manok	8	3	.727	—	Twice-to-beat in the quarterfinals
3	Alaska Aces	7	4	.636	1	Best-of-three quarterfinals
4	Barangay Ginebra San Miguel	6	5	.545 (Note: Head-to-head quotient: Barangay Ginebra 1.03, Rain or Shine 1.02, NLEX 0.95)	2	Best-of-three quarterfinals
5	Rain or Shine Elasto Painters	6	5	.545	2	Best-of-three quarterfinals
6	NLEX Road Warriors	6	5	.545	2	Best-of-three quarterfinals
7	GlobalPort Batang Pier	5	6	.455 (Note: Head-to-head quotient: GlobalPort 1.14, Phoenix 1.00, TNT 0.97, Blackwater 0.89; 8th seed playoff: TNT 118–97 Phoenix)	3	Twice-to-win in the quarterfinals
8	TNT KaTropa	5	6	.455	3	Twice-to-win in the quarterfinals
9	Phoenix Fuel Masters	5	6	.455	3	
10	Blackwater Elite	5	6	.455	3	
11	Meralco Bolts	4	7	.364	4	
12	Kia Picanto	1	10	.091	7	

Source: PBA.ph
Rules for classification: 1) winning percentage; 2) if two teams are tied, head to head record; if three or more teams are tied, head-to-head goal average (quotient), if tied for 8th, one-game playoff; 3) overall quotient 4) coin toss

==== Game log ====
2018 PBA Philippine Cup game log
Total: 4–7
December: 1–1

Game	Date	Opponent	Score	High points	High rebounds	High assists	Location Attendance	Record
1	December 22	Blackwater	W 103–98	KG Canaleta (25)	Jason Ballesteros (12)	Baser Amer (12)	Cuneta Astrodome	1–0
2	December 27	San Miguel	L 97–103	Mike Tolomia (21)	Chris Newsome (13)	Baser Amer (9)	Ynares Center	1–1

January: 1–3

Game	Date	Opponent	Score	High points	High rebounds	High assists	Location Attendance	Record
3	January 10	Alaska	L 98–103	Chris Newsome (23)	KG Canaleta (10)	Amer, Newsome (4)	Smart Araneta Coliseum	1–2
4	January 21	TNT	L 81–99	Baser Amer (20)	Amer, Ballesteros (6)	Baser Amer (6)	Ynares Center	1–3
5	January 24	Kia	W 105–76	KG Canaleta (17)	Chris Newsome (7)	Baser Amer (9)	Smart Araneta Coliseum	2–3
6	January 28	GlobalPort	L 88–107	Hugnatan, Newsome (17)	Cliff Hodge (8)	three players (3)	Smart Araneta Coliseum	2–4

February: 2–3

Game	Date	Opponent	Score	High points	High rebounds	High assists	Location Attendance	Record
7	February 2	Rain or Shine	L 84–90	KG Canaleta (24)	Chris Newsome (11)	Chris Newsome (7)	Mall of Asia Arena	2–5
8	February 9	NLEX	L 85–87	Nico Salva (20)	Chris Newsome (10)	Chris Newsome (7)	Cuneta Astrodome	2–6
9	February 14	Phoenix	W 92–90	Garvo Lanete (24)	Jason Ballesteros (12)	Chris Newsome (5)	Smart Araneta Coliseum	3–6
10	February 18	Barangay Ginebra	W 84–82	Garvo Lanete (19)	Jason Ballesteros (17)	Chris Newsome (6)	Philippine Arena	4–6
11	February 24	Magnolia	L 65–94	Chris Newsome (13)	Jason Ballesteros (9)	Chris Newsome (3)	Xavier University Gym	4–7

== Commissioner's Cup ==
=== Eliminations ===
==== Standings ====
Pos	Team	W	L	PCT	GB	Qualification
1	Rain or Shine Elasto Painters	9	2	.818	—	Twice-to-beat in the quarterfinals
2	Alaska Aces	8	3	.727 (Note: Head-to-head record: Alaska 1–0 TNT)	1	Twice-to-beat in the quarterfinals
3	TNT KaTropa	8	3	.727	1	Best-of-three quarterfinals
4	Meralco Bolts	7	4	.636	2	Best-of-three quarterfinals
5	Barangay Ginebra San Miguel	6	5	.545 (Note: Head-to-head quotient: Barangay Ginebra 1.07, San Miguel 1.02, Magnolia 0.92)	3	Best-of-three quarterfinals
6	San Miguel Beermen	6	5	.545	3	Best-of-three quarterfinals
7	Magnolia Hotshots Pambansang Manok	6	5	.545	3	Twice-to-win in the quarterfinals
8	GlobalPort Batang Pier	5	6	.455	4	Twice-to-win in the quarterfinals
9	Columbian Dyip	4	7	.364 (Note: Head-to-head record: Columbian 1–0 Phoenix)	5	
10	Phoenix Fuel Masters	4	7	.364	5	
11	NLEX Road Warriors	2	9	.182	7	
12	Blackwater Elite	1	10	.091	8	

Source: PBA.ph
Rules for classification: 1) winning percentage; 2) if two teams are tied, head to head record; if three or more teams are tied, head-to-head goal average (quotient); 3) overall quotient 4) coin toss

==== Game log ====
2018 PBA Commissioner's Cup game log
Total: 7–4
April: 1–1

Game	Date	Opponent	Score	High points	High rebounds	High assists	Location Attendance	Record
1	April 25	Columbian	W 116–103	Arinze Onuaku (30)	Arinze Onuaku (19)	Chris Newsome (7)	Smart Araneta Coliseum	1–0
2	April 27	GlobalPort	L 85–86	KG Canaleta (28)	Arinze Onuaku (14)	Baser Amer (8)	Smart Araneta Coliseum	1–1

May: 2–1

Game	Date	Opponent	Score	High points	High rebounds	High assists	Location Attendance	Record
3	May 4	NLEX	W 106–90	Chris Newsome (30)	Arinze Onuaku (23)	Baser Amer (6)	Smart Araneta Coliseum	2–1
4	May 9	San Miguel	W 93–85	Baser Amer (28)	Arinze Onuaku (12)	Arinze Onuaku (8)	Mall of Asia Arena	3–1
5	May 18	Magnolia	L 79–81	Arinze Onuaku (23)	Arinze Onuaku (11)	Newsome, Onuaku (7)	Smart Araneta Coliseum	3–2
All-Star Break

June: 4–2

Game	Date	Opponent	Score	High points	High rebounds	High assists	Location Attendance	Record
6	June 1	Barangay Ginebra	W 93–82	Arinze Onuaku (24)	Arinze Onuaku (23)	Anjo Caram (7)	Mall of Asia Arena	4–2
7	June 8	Phoenix	W 103–100 (OT)	KG Canaleta (30)	Arinze Onuaku (20)	Arinze Onuaku (10)	Smart Araneta Coliseum	5–2
8	June 15	Blackwater	W 102–75	Arinze Onuaku (17)	Arinze Onuaku (16)	Chris Newsome (6)	Mall of Asia Arena	6–2
9	June 17	Alaska	W 89–74	Chris Newsome (18)	Arinze Onuaku (23)	Chris Newsome (8)	Smart Araneta Coliseum	7–2
10	June 22	TNT	L 85–91	Chris Newsome (17)	Arinze Onuaku (11)	Hodge, Onuaku (4)	Smart Araneta Coliseum	7–3
11	June 24	Rain or Shine	L 99–106 (OT)	Chris Newsome (21)	Arinze Onuaku (11)	Chris Newsome (11)	Smart Araneta Coliseum	7–4

=== Playoffs ===
==== Bracket ====
Quarterfinals
(#1 twice-to-beat)
1	Rain or Shine	113	103
8	GlobalPort	114	97
(Best-of-3)
4	Meralco	0
5	Barangay Ginebra	2
(#2 twice-to-beat)
2	Alaska	89
7	Magnolia	78
(Best-of-3)
3	TNT	0
6	San Miguel	2

Semifinals (Best-of-5)
1	Rain or Shine	1
5	Barangay Ginebra	3
2	Alaska	1
6	San Miguel	3

finals (Best-of-7)
5	Barangay Ginebra	4
6	San Miguel	2

==== Game log ====
2018 PBA Commissioner's Cup playoffs game log
Total: 0–2
Quarterfinals: 0–2

Game	Date	Opponent	Score	High points	High rebounds	High assists	Location Attendance	Series
1	July 9	Barangay Ginebra	L 81–88	Baser Amer (15)	Arinze Onuaku (18)	Chris Newsome (7)	Smart Araneta Coliseum	0–1
2	July 11	Barangay Ginebra	L 90–104	Arinze Onuaku (21)	Arinze Onuaku (13)	Amer, Newsome (4)	Smart Araneta Coliseum	0–2

== Governors' Cup ==
=== Eliminations ===
==== Standings ====
Pos	Team	W	L	PCT	GB	Qualification
1	Barangay Ginebra San Miguel	9	2	.818	—	Twice-to-beat in quarterfinals
2	Phoenix Fuel Masters	8	3	.727 (Note: Head-to-head quotient: Phoenix 1.011, Alaska 1.006, Magnolia 0.982)	1	Twice-to-beat in quarterfinals
3	Alaska Aces	8	3	.727	1	Twice-to-beat in quarterfinals
4	Magnolia Hotshots Pambansang Manok	8	3	.727	1	Twice-to-beat in quarterfinals
5	Blackwater Elite	7	4	.636	2	Twice-to-win in quarterfinals
6	San Miguel Beermen	6	5	.545	3	Twice-to-win in quarterfinals
7	Meralco Bolts	5	6	.455 (Note: Head-to-head record: Meralco 1–0 NLEX)	4	Twice-to-win in quarterfinals
8	NLEX Road Warriors	5	6	.455	4	Twice-to-win in quarterfinals
9	TNT KaTropa	4	7	.364	5	
10	Rain or Shine Elasto Painters	3	8	.273	6	
11	NorthPort Batang Pier	2	9	.182	7	
12	Columbian Dyip	1	10	.091	8	

Source: PBA.ph
Rules for classification: 1) winning percentage; 2) if two teams are tied, head-to-head record; if three or more teams are tied, head-to-head goal average (quotient); 3) overall quotient 4) coin toss

==== Game log ====
2018 PBA Governors' Cup game log
Total: 5–6
August: 1–2

Game	Date	Opponent	Score	High points	High rebounds	High assists	Location Attendance	Record
1	August 17	Columbian	W 109–106	Allen Durham (26)	Allen Durham (20)	Allen Durham (9)	Ynares Center	1–0
2	August 19	TNT	L 90–92	Allen Durham (27)	Allen Durham (22)	Allen Durham (8)	Ynares Center	1–1
3	August 24	Alaska	L 72–80	Allen Durham (21)	Allen Durham (11)	Baser Amer (5)	Mall of Asia Arena	1–2

September: 0–1

Game	Date	Opponent	Score	High points	High rebounds	High assists	Location Attendance	Record
4	September 19	Phoenix	L 86–96	Chris Newsome (18)	Allen Durham (13)	Allen Durham (9)	Smart Araneta Coliseum	1–3

October: 3–3

Game	Date	Opponent	Score	High points	High rebounds	High assists	Location Attendance	Record
5	October 5	Blackwater	L 91–94	Allen Durham (32)	Allen Durham (21)	Allen Durham (6)	Smart Araneta Coliseum	1–4
6	October 7	Barangay Ginebra	L 105–111	Allen Durham (36)	Allen Durham (16)	Allen Durham (9)	Sta. Rosa Multi-Purpose Complex	1–5
7	October 12	NorthPort	L 94–99	Allen Durham (37)	Allen Durham (19)	Allen Durham (7)	Mall of Asia Arena	1–6
8	October 14	NLEX	W 108–105	Allen Durham (36)	Allen Durham (18)	Chris Newsome (9)	Smart Araneta Coliseum	2–6
9	October 19	Magnolia	W 94–88	Allen Durham (20)	Allen Durham (18)	Durham, Newsome (8)	Ynares Center	3–6
10	October 21	Rain or Shine	W 91–82	Allen Durham (19)	Allen Durham (20)	three players (6)	Smart Araneta Coliseum	4–6

November: 1–0

Game	Date	Opponent	Score	High points	High rebounds	High assists	Location Attendance	Record
11	November 3	San Miguel	W 111–81	Allen Durham (35)	Allen Durham (26)	Chris Newsome (12)	Smart Araneta Coliseum	5–6

=== Playoffs ===
==== Bracket ====
Quarterfinals (Top 4 twice-to-beat)
1	Barangay Ginebra	111
8	NLEX	75
4	Magnolia	103
5	Blackwater	99
2	Phoenix	74	103
7	Meralco	90	108*
3	Alaska	96
6	San Miguel	85

Semifinals (Best-of-5)
1	Barangay Ginebra	1
4	Magnolia	3
7	Meralco	1
3	Alaska	3

Finals (Best-of-7)
4	Magnolia	4
3	Alaska	2

*Game went into overtime.

==== Game log ====
2018 PBA Governors' Cup playoffs game log
Total: 3–3
Quarterfinals: 2–0

Game	Date	Opponent	Score	High points	High rebounds	High assists	Location Attendance	Series
1	November 7	Phoenix	W 90–74	Allen Durham (26)	Allen Durham (16)	Baser Amer (6)	Cuneta Astrodome	1–0
2	November 9	Phoenix	W 108–103 (OT)	Allen Durham (32)	Allen Durham (21)	Allen Durham (9)	Smart Araneta Coliseum	2–0

Semifinals: 1–3

Game	Date	Opponent	Score	High points	High rebounds	High assists	Location Attendance	Series
1	November 11	Alaska	W 97–92	Allen Durham (32)	Allen Durham (14)	Allen Durham (6)	Ynares Center	1–0
2	November 13	Alaska	L 95–100	Allen Durham (24)	Allen Durham (9)	Allen Durham (12)	Mall of Asia Arena	1–1
3	November 15	Alaska	L 102–104	Allen Durham (37)	Allen Durham (13)	Allen Durham (8)	Cuneta Astrodome	1–2
4	November 17	Alaska	L 92–99	Allen Durham (31)	Allen Durham (14)	Chris Newsome (7)	Cuneta Astrodome	1–3

== FIBA Asia Champions Cup ==
The Bolts were chosen as the Philippine representative to the 2018 FIBA Asia Champions Cup.

=== Group B ===
Pos	Team	Pld	W	L	PF	PA	PD	Pts	Qualification
1	(Japan) Alvark Tokyo	3	3	0	279	249	+30	6	Final round
2	(Philippines) Meralco Bolts	3	1	2	261	247	+14	4 (Note: Meralco 1–1, +25 PD; Mono 1–1, +2 PD; Al Riyadi 1–1, −27 PD)	Final round
3	(Thailand) Mono Vampire (H)	3	1	2	300	306	−6	4	Classification round
4	(Lebanon) Al Riyadi	3	1	2	245	283	−38	4	Classification round

Source: FIBA
Rules for classification: 1) Tournament points; 2) Head-to-head results; 3) Head-to-head points difference; 4) Head-to-head points scored; 5) Overall points difference; 6) Overall points scored; 7) Random draw
(H) Hosts

=== Final round ===
Semifinals
1 October–18:00
(Iran) Petrochimi	79
(Philippines) Meralco Bolts	74
1 October–20:30
(Japan) Alvark Tokyo	78
(South Korea) Seoul SK Knights	54

Gold medal game
2 October–20:30
(Iran) Petrochimi	68
(Japan) Alvark Tokyo	64
Bronze medal game
2 October–18:00
(Philippines) Meralco Bolts	87
(South Korea) Seoul SK Knights	91

== Transactions ==
=== Free Agency ===
==== Addition ====
Country	Player	Number	Position	Contract	Date signed	Former Team
(Philippines)	Niño Canaleta	12	F	—N/a	—N/a	Blackwater Elite
(Philippines)	Nico Salva	8	F	—N/a	—N/a	Kia Picanto
(Philippines)	Marnel Baracael	45	F	—N/a	—N/a	GlobalPort Batang Pier
(Philippines)	Jason Ballesteros	18	C	—N/a	—N/a	Kia Picanto

=== Recruited imports ===
Conference	Name	Country	Number	Debuted	Last game	Record
Commissioner's Cup	Arinze Onuaku	(United States)	5	April 25 (vs. Columbian)	July 11 (vs. Barangay Ginebra)	7–6
Governors' Cup	Allen Durham	(United States)	5	August 17 (vs. Columbian)	November 17 (vs. Alaska)	8–9
FIBA Asia Champions Cup	Allen Durham	(United States)	5	September 27 (vs. Mono Vampire)	October 2 (vs. SK Knights)	1–4
FIBA Asia Champions Cup	Diamond Stone	(United States)	33	September 27 (vs. Mono Vampire)	October 2 (vs. SK Knights)	1–4

== Awards ==
Recipient	Award	Date awarded	Ref.
Baser Amer	Governors' Cup Player of the Week	November 13, 2018	
