= 2017–18 San Miguel Beermen season =

- Head coach: Leo Austria
- Owners: San Miguel Brewery, Inc. (a San Miguel Corporation subsidiary)

Philippine Cup results
- Record: 8–3 (72.7%)
- Place: 1st
- Playoff finish: Champions (Defeated Magnolia, 4–1)

Commissioner's Cup results
- Record: 6–5 (54.5%)
- Place: 6th
- Playoff finish: Runner-up (lost to Barangay Ginebra, 2–4)

Governors' Cup results
- Record: 6–5 (54.5%)
- Place: 6th
- Playoff finish: Quarterfinalist (lost to Alaska with twice-to-win disadvantage)

San Miguel Beermen seasons

The 2017–18 San Miguel Beermen season was the 43rd season of the franchise in the Philippine Basketball Association (PBA).

== Key dates ==
=== 2017 ===
- October 29: The 2017 PBA draft took place in Midtown Atrium, Robinsons Place Manila.

== Draft picks ==
Round	Pick	Player	Position	Nationality	PBA D-League team	College
1	1	Christian Standhardinger	F/C	Germany		Hawaiʻi
2	17	Louie Vigil	G/F	Philippines	Blackwater Sports; Tanduay Light Rhum Masters; Bread Story Smashing Bakers	UST
3	34	Jerome Ortega	G	Philippines	AMA Titans	AMA
4	41	Joseph Nalos	G	Philippines	Z.C. Aguilas; Zark's Jawbreakers	Adamson

== Roster ==
2017–18 San Miguel Beermen roster
Players
Coaches

Pos.	#	POB	Name	Height	Weight	DOB (YYYY–MM–DD)	From
G	1	(Philippines)	Brian Heruela	5 ft 10 in (1.78 m)	195 lb (88 kg)	1989–04–13	Cebu
F/C	2	(Philippines)	Billy Mamaril	6 ft 6 in (1.98 m)	225 lb (102 kg)	1980–06–25	Bakersfield
G/F	3	(Philippines)	Von Pessumal	6 ft 2 in (1.88 m)	185 lb (84 kg)	1993–02–12	Ateneo
G	5	(Philippines)	Alex Cabagnot	6 ft 0 in (1.83 m)	185 lb (84 kg)	1982–12–08	Hawaiʻi–Hilo
G	6	(United States)	Chris Ross	6 ft 2 in (1.88 m)	180 lb (82 kg)	1985–03–09	Marshall
G/F	13	(United States)	Marcio Lassiter	6 ft 2 in (1.88 m)	185 lb (84 kg)	1987–05–16	Cal State Fullerton
C	15	(Philippines)	June Mar Fajardo	6 ft 11 in (2.11 m)	268 lb (122 kg)	1989–11–17	Cebu
G	18	(Philippines)	Louie Vigil (R)	6 ft 3 in (1.91 m)		1991–09–26	UST
G/F	22	(Philippines)	Matt Ganuelas-Rosser	6 ft 5 in (1.96 m)	186 lb (84 kg)	1990–06–13	Cal Poly Pomona
F	23	(Philippines)	Keith Agovida	6 ft 2 in (1.88 m)	170 lb (77 kg)	1990–02–14	Arellano
G	26	(Philippines)	Chico Lanete	6 ft 0 in (1.83 m)	180 lb (82 kg)	1979–08–01	Lyceum
F	29	(Philippines)	Arwind Santos (C)	6 ft 4 in (1.93 m)	175 lb (79 kg)	1981–06–10	Far Eastern
F/C	30	(United States)	Kelly Nabong	6 ft 6 in (1.98 m)	227 lb (103 kg)	1988–11–17	SRJC
F	33	(Australia)	David Semerad	6 ft 4 in (1.93 m)	220 lb (100 kg)	1991–04–25	San Beda
F/C	34	(Germany)	Christian Standhardinger (R)	6 ft 8 in (2.03 m)	220 lb (100 kg)	1989–07–04	Hawaiʻi
C	95	(Philippines)	Yancy de Ocampo	6 ft 9 in (2.06 m)	245 lb (111 kg)	1980–03–11	Saint Francis of Assisi

Head coach

- (Philippines) Leo Austria

Assistant coach(es)

- (Philippines) Peter Martin (1st Assistant)
- (Philippines) Biboy Ravanes
- (Philippines) Dayong Mendoza
- (Philippines) Boyzie Zamar
- (Philippines) Ato Agustin
- (Philippines) Jorge Gallent

Team manager

- (Philippines) Gelacio Abanilla
- (Philippines) Daniel Henares (Assistant)

Legend

- (C) Team captain
- (CI) Commissioner's Cup Import
- (GI) Governors' Cup Import
- (EI) EASL Import
- (DP) Unsigned draft pick
- (FA) Free agent
- (IN) Inactive
- (S) Suspended
- (R) Rookie
- Injured

== Philippine Cup ==
=== Eliminations ===
==== Standings ====
Pos	Team	W	L	PCT	GB	Qualification
1	San Miguel Beermen	8	3	.727 (Note: Head-to-head record: San Miguel 1–0 Magnolia)	—	Twice-to-beat in the quarterfinals
2	Magnolia Hotshots Pambansang Manok	8	3	.727	—	Twice-to-beat in the quarterfinals
3	Alaska Aces	7	4	.636	1	Best-of-three quarterfinals
4	Barangay Ginebra San Miguel	6	5	.545 (Note: Head-to-head quotient: Barangay Ginebra 1.03, Rain or Shine 1.02, NLEX 0.95)	2	Best-of-three quarterfinals
5	Rain or Shine Elasto Painters	6	5	.545	2	Best-of-three quarterfinals
6	NLEX Road Warriors	6	5	.545	2	Best-of-three quarterfinals
7	GlobalPort Batang Pier	5	6	.455 (Note: Head-to-head quotient: GlobalPort 1.14, Phoenix 1.00, TNT 0.97, Blackwater 0.89; 8th seed playoff: TNT 118–97 Phoenix)	3	Twice-to-win in the quarterfinals
8	TNT KaTropa	5	6	.455	3	Twice-to-win in the quarterfinals
9	Phoenix Fuel Masters	5	6	.455	3	
10	Blackwater Elite	5	6	.455	3	
11	Meralco Bolts	4	7	.364	4	
12	Kia Picanto	1	10	.091	7	

Source: PBA.ph
Rules for classification: 1) winning percentage; 2) if two teams are tied, head to head record; if three or more teams are tied, head-to-head goal average (quotient), if tied for 8th, one-game playoff; 3) overall quotient 4) coin toss

==== Game log ====
2018 PBA Philippine Cup game log
Total: 8–3
December: 2–0

Game	Date	Opponent	Score	High points	High rebounds	High assists	Location Attendance	Record
1	December 17	Phoenix	W 104–96	June Mar Fajardo (23)	June Mar Fajardo (16)	Chris Ross (9)	Smart Araneta Coliseum; 5,600	1–0
2	December 27	Meralco	W 103–97	Alex Cabagnot (29)	Arwind Santos (10)	Chris Ross (7)	Ynares Center	2–0

January : 3–1

Game	Date	Opponent	Score	High points	High rebounds	High assists	Location Attendance	Record
3	January 13	TNT	W 88–76	June Mar Fajardo (20)	Alex Cabagnot (12)	Chris Ross (8)	University of San Agustin Gym	3–0
4	January 19	NLEX	W 109–98	Arwind Santos (26)	June Mar Fajardo (16)	Alex Cabagnot (9)	Cuneta Astrodome	4–0
5	January 24	GlobalPort	W 107–93	June Mar Fajardo (34)	June Mar Fajardo (13)	Arwind Santos (6)	Smart Araneta Coliseum	5–0
6	January 28	Barangay Ginebra	L 96–100	June Mar Fajardo (33)	June Mar Fajardo (11)	Chris Ross (6)	Smart Araneta Coliseum	5–1

February : 3–2

Game	Date	Opponent	Score	High points	High rebounds	High assists	Location Attendance	Record
7	February 4	Magnolia	W 77–76	June Mar Fajardo (19)	June Mar Fajardo (21)	Marcio Lassiter (5)	Ynares Center	6–1
8	February 9	Blackwater	L 96–106	Arwind Santos (22)	June Mar Fajardo (13)	Chris Ross (7)	Cuneta Astrodome	6–2
9	February 17	Alaska	W 109–96	Chris Ross (24)	June Mar Fajardo (18)	Chris Ross (9)	Batangas City Coliseum	7–2
10	February 23	Kia	W 108–106	Arwind Santos (27)	Arwind Santos (12)	Chris Ross (10)	Smart Araneta Coliseum	8–2
11	February 28	Rain or Shine	L 80–95	June Mar Fajardo (19)	June Mar Fajardo (10)	Chris Ross (4)	Mall of Asia Arena	8–3

=== Playoffs ===
==== Bracket ====
Quarterfinals
(#1 twice-to-beat)
1	San Miguel	106
8	TNT	93
(Best-of-3)
4	Barangay Ginebra	2
5	Rain or Shine	0
(#2 twice-to-beat)
2	Magnolia	86
7	GlobalPort	79
(Best-of-3)
3	Alaska	0
6	NLEX	2

Semifinals (Best-of-7)
1	San Miguel	4
4	Barangay Ginebra	1
2	Magnolia	4
6	NLEX	2

Finals (Best-of-7)
1	San Miguel	4
2	Magnolia	1

==== Game log ====
2018 PBA Philippine Cup playoffs game log
Total: 9–2
Quarterfinals: 1–0

Game	Date	Opponent	Score	High points	High rebounds	High assists	Location Attendance	Series
1	March 6	TNT	W 106–93	June Mar Fajardo (35)	June Mar Fajardo (11)	Chris Ross (7)	Mall of Asia Arena	1–0

Semifinals: 4–1

Game	Date	Opponent	Score	High points	High rebounds	High assists	Location Attendance	Series
1	March 9	Barangay Ginebra	W 102–90	Arwind Santos (23)	Arwind Santos (9)	Chris Ross (8)	Smart Araneta Coliseum	1–0
2	March 11	Barangay Ginebra	W 104–102 (OT)	June Mar Fajardo (33)	June Mar Fajardo (19)	Arwind Santos (5)	Smart Araneta Coliseum	2–0
3	March 13	Barangay Ginebra	L 87–95	June Mar Fajardo (23)	June Mar Fajardo (16)	Marcio Lassiter (4)	Mall of Asia Arena	2–1
4	March 15	Barangay Ginebra	W 102–81	Marcio Lassiter (23)	June Mar Fajardo (13)	Matt Ganuelas-Rosser (10)	Mall of Asia Arena	3–1
5	March 17	Barangay Ginebra	W 100–94	June Mar Fajardo (25)	Arwind Santos (13)	Alex Cabagnot (5)	Cuneta Astrodome	4–1

Finals: 4–1

Game	Date	Opponent	Score	High points	High rebounds	High assists	Location Attendance	Series
1	March 23	Magnolia	L 103–105	June Mar Fajardo (31)	June Mar Fajardo (18)	Alex Cabagnot (9)	Smart Araneta Coliseum	0–1
2	March 25	Magnolia	W 92–77	Arwind Santos (24)	June Mar Fajardo (13)	Chris Ross (10)	Mall of Asia Arena	1–1
3	April 1	Magnolia	W 111–87	Marcio Lassiter (24)	June Mar Fajardo (17)	Alex Cabagnot (8)	Smart Araneta Coliseum	2–1
4	April 4	Magnolia	W 84–80	Alex Cabagnot (27)	June Mar Fajardo (13)	Chris Ross (7)	Smart Araneta Coliseum	3–1
5	April 6	Magnolia	W 108–99 (2OT)	June Mar Fajardo (42)	June Mar Fajardo (20)	Chris Ross (11)	Mall of Asia Arena	4–1

== Commissioner's Cup ==
=== Eliminations ===
==== Standings ====
Pos	Team	W	L	PCT	GB	Qualification
1	Rain or Shine Elasto Painters	9	2	.818	—	Twice-to-beat in the quarterfinals
2	Alaska Aces	8	3	.727 (Note: Head-to-head record: Alaska 1–0 TNT)	1	Twice-to-beat in the quarterfinals
3	TNT KaTropa	8	3	.727	1	Best-of-three quarterfinals
4	Meralco Bolts	7	4	.636	2	Best-of-three quarterfinals
5	Barangay Ginebra San Miguel	6	5	.545 (Note: Head-to-head quotient: Barangay Ginebra 1.07, San Miguel 1.02, Magnolia 0.92)	3	Best-of-three quarterfinals
6	San Miguel Beermen	6	5	.545	3	Best-of-three quarterfinals
7	Magnolia Hotshots Pambansang Manok	6	5	.545	3	Twice-to-win in the quarterfinals
8	GlobalPort Batang Pier	5	6	.455	4	Twice-to-win in the quarterfinals
9	Columbian Dyip	4	7	.364 (Note: Head-to-head record: Columbian 1–0 Phoenix)	5	
10	Phoenix Fuel Masters	4	7	.364	5	
11	NLEX Road Warriors	2	9	.182	7	
12	Blackwater Elite	1	10	.091	8	

Source: PBA.ph
Rules for classification: 1) winning percentage; 2) if two teams are tied, head to head record; if three or more teams are tied, head-to-head goal average (quotient); 3) overall quotient 4) coin toss

==== Game log ====
2018 PBA Commissioner's Cup game log
Total: 6–5
May: 1–3

Game	Date	Opponent	Score	High points	High rebounds	High assists	Location Attendance	Record
1	May 9	Meralco	L 85–93	Troy Gillenwater (19)	Troy Gillenwater (14)	Alex Cabagnot (7)	Mall of Asia Arena	0–1
2	May 13	Rain or Shine	L 119–123 (OT)	Arwind Santos (29)	Christian Standhardinger (15)	Alex Cabagnot (9)	Ynares Center	0–2
3	May 19	Alaska	L 103–105	Renaldo Balkman (32)	Renaldo Balkman (13)	Alex Cabagnot (4)	Lamberto Macias Sports and Cultural Center	0–3
All-Star Break
4	May 30	Phoenix	W 106–94	Renaldo Balkman (35)	Renaldo Balkman (17)	Alex Cabagnot (7)	Smart Araneta Coliseum	1–3

June : 4–1

Game	Date	Opponent	Score	High points	High rebounds	High assists	Location Attendance	Record
5	June 3	Barangay Ginebra	W 104–97 (OT)	Renaldo Balkman (27)	June Mar Fajardo (19)	Alex Cabagnot (8)	Mall of Asia Arena	2–3
6	June 6	Columbian	W 129–117	June Mar Fajardo (37)	Balkman, Fajardo (18)	Alex Cabagnot (10)	Smart Araneta Coliseum	3–3
7	June 13	GlobalPort	L 94–98	Renaldo Balkman (33)	Renaldo Balkman (13)	Renaldo Balkman (6)	Mall of Asia Arena	3–4
8	June 16	TNT	W 100–94	Renaldo Balkman (43)	Renaldo Balkman (15)	Chris Ross (7)	Mall of Asia Arena	4–4
9	June 23	NLEX	W 125–114	June Mar Fajardo (30)	Renaldo Balkman (16)	Chris Ross (8)	Calasiao Sports Complex	5–4

July : 1–1

Game	Date	Opponent	Score	High points	High rebounds	High assists	Location Attendance	Record
10	July 4	Blackwater	W 115–106	Arwind Santos (23)	Arwind Santos (15)	Marcio Lassiter (6)	Mall of Asia Arena	6–4
11	July 7	Magnolia	L 97–101	Renaldo Balkman (31)	June Mar Fajardo (12)	Alex Cabagnot (7)	Smart Araneta Coliseum	6–5

=== Playoffs ===
==== Bracket ====
Quarterfinals
(#1 twice-to-beat)
1	Rain or Shine	113	103
8	GlobalPort	114	97
(Best-of-3)
4	Meralco	0
5	Barangay Ginebra	2
(#2 twice-to-beat)
2	Alaska	89
7	Magnolia	78
(Best-of-3)
3	TNT	0
6	San Miguel	2

Semifinals (Best-of-5)
1	Rain or Shine	1
5	Barangay Ginebra	3
2	Alaska	1
6	San Miguel	3

finals (Best-of-7)
5	Barangay Ginebra	4
6	San Miguel	2

==== Game log ====
2018 PBA Commissioner's Cup playoffs game log
Total: 7–5
Quarterfinals: 2–0

Game	Date	Opponent	Score	High points	High rebounds	High assists	Location Attendance	Series
1	July 9	TNT	W 121–110	Renaldo Balkman (36)	Renaldo Balkman (16)	Cabagnot, Ross (6)	Smart Araneta Coliseum	1–0
2	July 11	TNT	W 106–102	Renaldo Balkman (25)	June Mar Fajardo (12)	Chris Ross (10)	Smart Araneta Coliseum	2–0

Semifinals: 3–1

Game	Date	Opponent	Score	High points	High rebounds	High assists	Location Attendance	Series
1	July 14	Alaska	W 92–79	June Mar Fajardo (17)	Renaldo Balkman (11)	Alex Cabagnot (5)	Mall of Asia Arena	1–0
2	July 16	Alaska	W 105–94	Renaldo Balkman (31)	June Mar Fajardo (18)	Alex Cabagnot (8)	Smart Araneta Coliseum	2–0
3	July 20	Alaska	L 104–125	Renaldo Balkman (28)	June Mar Fajardo (15)	Alex Cabagnot (7)	Ynares Center	2–1
4	July 22	Alaska	W 104–99	June Mar Fajardo (26)	Renaldo Balkman (16)	Alex Cabagnot (9)	Smart Araneta Coliseum	3–1

Finals: 2–4

Game	Date	Opponent	Score	High points	High rebounds	High assists	Location Attendance	Series
1	July 27	Barangay Ginebra	L 99–127	Renaldo Balkman (27)	Renaldo Balkman (13)	Alex Cabagnot (7)	Smart Araneta Coliseum; 11,883	0–1
2	July 29	Barangay Ginebra	W 134–109	Alex Cabagnot (33)	Renaldo Balkman (11)	Alex Cabagnot (9)	Smart Araneta Coliseum; 15,042	1–1
3	August 1	Barangay Ginebra	W 132–94	Renaldo Balkman (28)	June Mar Fajardo (15)	Marcio Lassiter (9)	Smart Araneta Coliseum	2–1
4	August 3	Barangay Ginebra	L 100–130	Arwind Santos (22)	June Mar Fajardo (14)	Alex Cabagnot (6)	Smart Araneta Coliseum; 12,288	2–2
5	August 5	Barangay Ginebra	L 83–87	Renaldo Balkman (34)	Renaldo Balkman (20)	Chris Ross (9)	Smart Araneta Coliseum; 16,958	2–3
6	August 8	Barangay Ginebra	L 77–87	June Mar Fajardo (29)	June Mar Fajardo (15)	Brian Heruela (4)	Mall of Asia Arena; 20,490	2–4

== Governors' Cup ==
=== Eliminations ===
==== Standings ====
Pos	Team	W	L	PCT	GB	Qualification
1	Barangay Ginebra San Miguel	9	2	.818	—	Twice-to-beat in quarterfinals
2	Phoenix Fuel Masters	8	3	.727 (Note: Head-to-head quotient: Phoenix 1.011, Alaska 1.006, Magnolia 0.982)	1	Twice-to-beat in quarterfinals
3	Alaska Aces	8	3	.727	1	Twice-to-beat in quarterfinals
4	Magnolia Hotshots Pambansang Manok	8	3	.727	1	Twice-to-beat in quarterfinals
5	Blackwater Elite	7	4	.636	2	Twice-to-win in quarterfinals
6	San Miguel Beermen	6	5	.545	3	Twice-to-win in quarterfinals
7	Meralco Bolts	5	6	.455 (Note: Head-to-head record: Meralco 1–0 NLEX)	4	Twice-to-win in quarterfinals
8	NLEX Road Warriors	5	6	.455	4	Twice-to-win in quarterfinals
9	TNT KaTropa	4	7	.364	5	
10	Rain or Shine Elasto Painters	3	8	.273	6	
11	NorthPort Batang Pier	2	9	.182	7	
12	Columbian Dyip	1	10	.091	8	

Source: PBA.ph
Rules for classification: 1) winning percentage; 2) if two teams are tied, head-to-head record; if three or more teams are tied, head-to-head goal average (quotient); 3) overall quotient 4) coin toss

==== Game log ====
2018 PBA Commissioner's Cup game log
Total: 6–5
September: 2–3

Game	Date	Opponent	Score	High points	High rebounds	High assists	Location Attendance	Record
1	September 1	NLEX	W 125–112	Christian Standhardinger (36)	Arizona Reid (13)	Alex Cabagnot (9)	Smart Araneta Coliseum	1–0
2	September 5	Blackwater	L 100–103	Arizona Reid (26)	Arizona Reid (12)	Alex Cabagnot (7)	Smart Araneta Coliseum	1–1
3	September 21	Columbian	W 143–119	Arwind Santos (29)	Arizona Reid (17)	Arizona Reid (11)	Smart Araneta Coliseum	2–1
4	September 23	Barangay Ginebra	L 102–110	Christian Standhardinger (25)	Christian Standhardinger (11)	Alex Cabagnot (9)	Smart Araneta Coliseum	2–2
5	September 30	Magnolia	L 108–109	Kevin Murphy (37)	Christian Standhardinger (16)	Kevin Murphy (7)	Smart Araneta Coliseum	2–3

October: 4–1

Game	Date	Opponent	Score	High points	High rebounds	High assists	Location Attendance	Record
6	October 6	Alaska	L 119–127	Kevin Murphy (45)	Christian Standhardinger (13)	Chris Ross (5)	Ynares Center	2–4
7	October 12	Phoenix	W 117–100	Christian Standhardinger (29)	Christian Standhardinger (14)	Chris Ross (9)	Mall of Asia Arena	3–4
8	October 20	TNT	W 107–96	Kevin Murphy (27)	Christian Standhardinger (13)	Kevin Murphy (9)	Calasiao Sports Complex	4–4
9	October 24	NorthPort	W 114–107	Kevin Murphy (27)	Christian Standhardinger (22)	Kevin Murphy (7)	Cuneta Astrodome	5–4
10	October 27	Rain or Shine	W 109–97	Kevin Murphy (28)	Christian Standhardinger (18)	Christian Standhardinger (4)	Alonte Sports Arena	6–4

November: 0–1

Game	Date	Opponent	Score	High points	High rebounds	High assists	Location Attendance	Record
11	November 3	Meralco	L 81–111	Kevin Murphy (32)	Christian Standhardinger (18)	Alex Cabagnot (3)	Smart Araneta Coliseum	6–5

=== Playoffs ===
==== Bracket ====
Quarterfinals (Top 4 twice-to-beat)
1	Barangay Ginebra	111
8	NLEX	75
4	Magnolia	103
5	Blackwater	99
2	Phoenix	74	103
7	Meralco	90	108*
3	Alaska	96
6	San Miguel	85

Semifinals (Best-of-5)
1	Barangay Ginebra	1
4	Magnolia	3
7	Meralco	1
3	Alaska	3

Finals (Best-of-7)
4	Magnolia	4
3	Alaska	2

*Game went into overtime.

==== Game log ====
2018 PBA Commissioner's Cup playoffs game log
Total: 0–1
Quarterfinals: 0–1

Game	Date	Opponent	Score	High points	High rebounds	High assists	Location Attendance	Series
1	November 7	Alaska	L 85–96	Kevin Murphy (19)	Christian Standhardinger (11)	Chris Ross (7)	Cuneta Astrodome	0–1

== Transactions ==
=== Trades ===
==== Preseason ====
October
October 27, 2017	To San Miguel 2017 PBA First Round Draft Pick	To KIA Ronald Tubid; Jay-R Reyes; Rashawn McCarthy; 2019 First Round Draft Pick

==== Commissioner's Cup ====
June
June 21, 2018	To San Miguel Kelly Nabong	To GlobalPort Gabby Espinas; 2020 second round draft pick

=== Free agency ===
==== Addition ====
Country	Player	Number	Position	Contract	Date signed	Former Team
(Philippines)	Billy Mamaril	2	Forward/center	—N/a	—N/a	GlobalPort
(Philippines)	Chico Lanete	26	Guard	—N/a	—N/a	Phoenix

==== Subtraction ====
Country	Player	Number	Position	Reason	New Team
(Philippines)	Michael Mabulac	28	Forward		Laguna Heroes (MPBL)

=== Rookie signings ===
Country	Player	Number	Position	Contract	Date signed	School/club team
(Germany)	Christian Standhardinger	--	Forward/center	3 years / 8.55 M	October 29, 2017	Hawaiʻi
(Philippines)	Louie Vigil	18	Guard/forward	—N/a	—N/a	UST

=== Recruited imports ===
Conference	Name	Country	Number	Debuted	Last game	Record
Commissioner's Cup	Troy Gillenwater	(United States)	7	May 9 (vs. Meralco)	May 13 (vs. Rain or Shine)	0–2
Commissioner's Cup	Renaldo Balkman	(Puerto Rico)	32	May 19 (vs. Alaska)	August 8 (vs. Barangay Ginebra)	13–8
Governors' Cup	Arizona Reid	(United States)	32	September 1 (vs. NLEX)	September 23 (vs. Barangay Ginebra)	2–2
Governors' Cup	Kevin Murphy	(United States)	55	September 30 (vs. Magnolia)	November 7 (vs. Alaska)	4–4

== Awards ==
Recipient	Award	Date awarded	Ref.
Marcio Lassiter	Philippine Cup Player of the Week	March 12, 2018	
June Mar Fajardo	Philippine Cup Player of the Week	March 19, 2018	
June Mar Fajardo	Philippine Cup Best Player of the Conference	April 4, 2018	
June Mar Fajardo	Philippine Cup Finals Most Valuable Player	April 6, 2018	
June Mar Fajardo	Commissioner's Cup Player of the Week	June 5, 2018	
June Mar Fajardo	Commissioner's Cup Best Player of the Conference	August 3, 2018	
Christian Standhardinger	Governors' Cup Player of the Week	September 5, 2018	
Christian Standhardinger	Governors' Cup Player of the Week	October 30, 2018	
