= 2017–18 TNT KaTropa season =

- Head coach: Nash Racela (replaced on September 21); Bong Ravena
- Consultant: Mark Dickel
- General manager: Virgil Villavicencio; Magnum Membrere (assistant)
- Owners: Smart Communications (an MVP Group subsidiary)

Philippine Cup results
- Record: 5–6 (45.5%)
- Place: 8th
- Playoff finish: Quarterfinalist (lost to San Miguel with twice-to-win disadvantage)

Commissioner's Cup results
- Record: 8–3 (72.7%)
- Place: 3rd
- Playoff finish: Quarterfinalist (lost to San Miguel, 0–2)

Governors' Cup results
- Record: 4–7 (36.4%)
- Place: 9th
- Playoff finish: Did not qualify

TNT KaTropa seasons

The 2017–18 TNT KaTropa season was the 28th season of the franchise in the Philippine Basketball Association (PBA).

== Key dates ==
=== 2017 ===
- October 29: The 2017 PBA draft took place in Midtown Atrium, Robinson Place Manila.

== Draft picks ==
Round	Pick	Player	Position	Nationality	PBA D-League team	College
1	10	Mark Tallo	G	Philippines	Racal Tile Masters	SWU
1	11	Jonjon Gabriel	C	Philippines	Marinerong Pilipino Skippers	Colegio de San Lorenzo
2	10	Monbert Arong	G	Philippines	Cignal HD Hawkeyes	FEU
3	9	Dave Moralde	G	Philippines	Marinerong Pilipino Skippers; JAM Liner	UP

== Roster ==
2017–18 TNT KaTropa roster
Players
Coaches

Pos.	#	POB	Name	Height	Weight	DOB (YYYY–MM–DD)	From
F/C	2	(Philippines)	Frank Golla	6 ft 5 in (1.96 m)	290 lb (132 kg)	1990–01–17	Ateneo
F	4	(United States)	Harvey Carey (C)	6 ft 3 in (1.91 m)	210 lb (95 kg)	1979–03–18	Sonoma State
G	7	(Philippines)	Terrence Romeo	5 ft 11 in (1.80 m)	178 lb (81 kg)	1992–03–16	Far Eastern
G	8	(Philippines)	RR Garcia	5 ft 11 in (1.80 m)	165 lb (75 kg)	1990–01–12	Far Eastern
G	9	(Philippines)	Levi Hernandez	6 ft 1 in (1.85 m)	190 lb (86 kg)	1990–03–09	Arellano
G	10	(Philippines)	Ryan Reyes	6 ft 2 in (1.88 m)	190 lb (86 kg)	1983–08–10	Cal State Fullerton
F	14	(Australia)	Anthony Semerad	6 ft 4 in (1.93 m)	220 lb (100 kg)	1991–04–25	San Beda
G/F	16	(Philippines)	Roger Pogoy	6 ft 2 in (1.88 m)	180 lb (82 kg)	1992–06–16	Far Eastern
G	17	(Philippines)	Jayson Castro	5 ft 10 in (1.78 m)	185 lb (84 kg)	1986–06–30	Philippine Christian
F	18	(Philippines)	Troy Rosario	6 ft 7 in (2.01 m)	198 lb (90 kg)	1992–01–20	National-U
F	19	(Philippines)	Don Trollano	6 ft 3 in (1.91 m)	182 lb (83 kg)	1992–01–07	Adamson
F/C	21	(United States)	Kelly Williams	6 ft 6 in (1.98 m)	215 lb (98 kg)	1982–02–07	Oakland
G	25	(Philippines)	Alfrancis Tamsi	6 ft 1 in (1.85 m)	158 lb (72 kg)	1992–03–25	Far Eastern
F/C	26	(Philippines)	Philip Paredes	6 ft 5 in (1.96 m)	200 lb (91 kg)	1992–01–12	De La Salle
G	39	(Philippines)	Jericho Cruz	6 ft 1 in (1.85 m)	190 lb (86 kg)	1990–10–11	Adamson
F/C	41	(Philippines)	Jessie Saitanan	6 ft 5 in (1.96 m)	200 lb (91 kg)	1992–10–07	Mapúa
C	99	(Palestine)	Yousef Taha	6 ft 7 in (2.01 m)	231 lb (105 kg)	1988–07–08	Mapúa

Head coach

- (Philippines) Bong Ravena

Assistant coach(es)

- (Philippines) Josh Reyes (1st Assistant)
- (Philippines) Eric Gonzales
- (Philippines) Gilbert Lao
- (United States) Alton Lister
- (Philippines) Jonathan de Guzman
- (Philippines) Alexis Torres
- (New Zealand) Mark Dickel (Consultant)

Team manager

- (Philippines) Virgil Villavicencio
- (Philippines) Magnum Membrere (Assistant)

Legend

- (C) Team captain
- (CI) Commissioner's Cup Import
- (GI) Governors' Cup Import
- (EI) EASL Import
- (DP) Unsigned draft pick
- (FA) Free agent
- (IN) Inactive
- (S) Suspended
- (R) Rookie
- Injured

== Philippine Cup ==
=== Eliminations ===
==== Standings ====
Pos	Team	W	L	PCT	GB	Qualification
1	San Miguel Beermen	8	3	.727 (Note: Head-to-head record: San Miguel 1–0 Magnolia)	—	Twice-to-beat in the quarterfinals
2	Magnolia Hotshots Pambansang Manok	8	3	.727	—	Twice-to-beat in the quarterfinals
3	Alaska Aces	7	4	.636	1	Best-of-three quarterfinals
4	Barangay Ginebra San Miguel	6	5	.545 (Note: Head-to-head quotient: Barangay Ginebra 1.03, Rain or Shine 1.02, NLEX 0.95)	2	Best-of-three quarterfinals
5	Rain or Shine Elasto Painters	6	5	.545	2	Best-of-three quarterfinals
6	NLEX Road Warriors	6	5	.545	2	Best-of-three quarterfinals
7	GlobalPort Batang Pier	5	6	.455 (Note: Head-to-head quotient: GlobalPort 1.14, Phoenix 1.00, TNT 0.97, Blackwater 0.89; 8th seed playoff: TNT 118–97 Phoenix)	3	Twice-to-win in the quarterfinals
8	TNT KaTropa	5	6	.455	3	Twice-to-win in the quarterfinals
9	Phoenix Fuel Masters	5	6	.455	3	
10	Blackwater Elite	5	6	.455	3	
11	Meralco Bolts	4	7	.364	4	
12	Kia Picanto	1	10	.091	7	

Source: PBA.ph
Rules for classification: 1) winning percentage; 2) if two teams are tied, head to head record; if three or more teams are tied, head-to-head goal average (quotient), if tied for 8th, one-game playoff; 3) overall quotient 4) coin toss

==== Game log ====
2018 PBA Philippine Cup game log
Total: 5–6
December: 1–1

Game	Date	Opponent	Score	High points	High rebounds	High assists	Location Attendance	Record
1	December 22	Rain or Shine	L 79–82	Jayson Castro (18)	Troy Rosario (13)	Jayson Castro (10)	Cuneta Astrodome	0–1
2	December 29	Alaska	W 106–98	Troy Rosario (21)	three players (9)	Roger Pogoy (8)	Cuneta Astrodome	1–1

January: 3–2

Game	Date	Opponent	Score	High points	High rebounds	High assists	Location Attendance	Record
3	January 13	San Miguel	L 76–88	Troy Rosario (15)	Troy Rosario (13)	Jayson Castro (8)	University of San Agustin Gym	1–2
4	January 17	Blackwater	W 92–83	Roger Pogoy (24)	Moala Tautuaa (15)	three players (3)	Smart Araneta Coliseum	2–2
5	January 21	Meralco	W 99–81	Troy Rosario (22)	Troy Rosario (10)	RR Garcia (8)	Ynares Center	3–2
6	January 27	Magnolia	L 83–91	Moala Tautuaa (16)	Troy Rosario (12)	three players (4)	Smart Araneta Coliseum	3–3
7	January 31	Kia	W 90–85	Kelly Williams (23)	Roger Pogoy (11)	Castro, Reyes (4)	Mall of Asia Arena	4–3

February: 1–3

Game	Date	Opponent	Score	High points	High rebounds	High assists	Location Attendance	Record
8	February 7	Phoenix	L 72–74	Anthony Semerad (12)	Troy Rosario (8)	Jayson Castro (5)	Mall of Asia Arena	4–4
9	February 11	Barangay Ginebra	L 78–93	Castro, Williams (17)	Kelly Williams (15)	Jayson Castro (4)	Smart Araneta Coliseum	4–5
10	February 14	Meralco	L 84–99	Jayson Castro (24)	Tautuaa, Williams (12)	Jayson Castro (4)	Smart Araneta Coliseum	4–6
11	February 28	NLEX	W 101–75	Cruz, Williams (17)	Kelly Williams (16)	four players (4)	Mall of Asia Arena	5–6

=== Playoffs ===
==== Bracket ====
Quarterfinals
(#1 twice-to-beat)
1	San Miguel	106
8	TNT	93
(Best-of-3)
4	Barangay Ginebra	2
5	Rain or Shine	0
(#2 twice-to-beat)
2	Magnolia	86
7	GlobalPort	79
(Best-of-3)
3	Alaska	0
6	NLEX	2

Semifinals (Best-of-7)
1	San Miguel	4
4	Barangay Ginebra	1
2	Magnolia	4
6	NLEX	2

Finals (Best-of-7)
1	San Miguel	4
2	Magnolia	1

==== Game log ====
2018 PBA Philippine Cup playoffs game log
Total: 1–1
8th seed playoff: 1–0

Game	Date	Opponent	Score	High points	High rebounds	High assists	Location Attendance	Series
1	March 4	Phoenix	W 118–97	Troy Rosario (18)	Jayson Castro (8)	Jayson Castro (9)	Smart Araneta Coliseum	1–0

Quarterfinals: 0–1

Game	Date	Opponent	Score	High points	High rebounds	High assists	Location Attendance	Series
1	March 6	San Miguel	L 93–106	Castro, Troy Rosario (19)	Troy Rosario (7)	Jayson Castro (8)	Mall of Asia Arena	0–1

== Commissioner's Cup ==
=== Eliminations ===
==== Standings ====
Pos	Team	W	L	PCT	GB	Qualification
1	Rain or Shine Elasto Painters	9	2	.818	—	Twice-to-beat in the quarterfinals
2	Alaska Aces	8	3	.727 (Note: Head-to-head record: Alaska 1–0 TNT)	1	Twice-to-beat in the quarterfinals
3	TNT KaTropa	8	3	.727	1	Best-of-three quarterfinals
4	Meralco Bolts	7	4	.636	2	Best-of-three quarterfinals
5	Barangay Ginebra San Miguel	6	5	.545 (Note: Head-to-head quotient: Barangay Ginebra 1.07, San Miguel 1.02, Magnolia 0.92)	3	Best-of-three quarterfinals
6	San Miguel Beermen	6	5	.545	3	Best-of-three quarterfinals
7	Magnolia Hotshots Pambansang Manok	6	5	.545	3	Twice-to-win in the quarterfinals
8	GlobalPort Batang Pier	5	6	.455	4	Twice-to-win in the quarterfinals
9	Columbian Dyip	4	7	.364 (Note: Head-to-head record: Columbian 1–0 Phoenix)	5	
10	Phoenix Fuel Masters	4	7	.364	5	
11	NLEX Road Warriors	2	9	.182	7	
12	Blackwater Elite	1	10	.091	8	

Source: PBA.ph
Rules for classification: 1) winning percentage; 2) if two teams are tied, head to head record; if three or more teams are tied, head-to-head goal average (quotient); 3) overall quotient 4) coin toss

==== Game log ====
2018 PBA Commissioner's Cup game log
Total: 8–3
April: 2–0

Game	Date	Opponent	Score	High points	High rebounds	High assists	Location Attendance	Record
1	April 22	GlobalPort	W 128–114	Jayson Castro (21)	Jeremy Tyler (12)	Jayson Castro (10)	Smart Araneta Coliseum	1–0
2	April 28	Phoenix	W 106–98	Terrence Romeo (21)	Jeremy Tyler (15)	Jayson Castro (7)	Ynares Center	2–0

May: 2–1

Game	Date	Opponent	Score	High points	High rebounds	High assists	Location Attendance	Record
3	May 6	Barangay Ginebra	W 96–92	Jayson Castro (27)	Jeremy Tyler (15)	Castro, Cruz (5)	Mall of Asia Arena	3–0
4	May 13	Alaska	L 100–110	Jayson Castro (18)	Rosario, Tyler (11)	Terrence Romeo (8)	Ynares Center	3–1
5	May 18	Blackwater	W 120–101	Ryan Reyes (18)	Troy Rosario (11)	Cruz, Garcia (5)	Smart Araneta Coliseum	4–1
All-Star Break

June: 3–2

Game	Date	Opponent	Score	High points	High rebounds	High assists	Location Attendance	Record
6	June 1	Columbian	W 123–95	Troy Rosario (21)	Terrence Romeo (7)	Jericho Cruz (7)	Mall of Asia Arena	5–1
7	June 3	NLEX	W 117–106	Joshua Smith (24)	Joshua Smith (13)	Terrence Romeo (8)	Mall of Asia Arena	6–1
8	June 13	Magnolia	L 89–111	Terrence Romeo (17)	Joshua Smith (13)	Terrence Romeo (7)	Mall of Asia Arena	6–2
9	June 16	San Miguel	L 94–100	Joshua Smith (26)	Joshua Smith (18)	Jayson Castro (6)	Mall of Asia Arena	6–3
10	June 22	Meralco	W 91–85	Troy Rosario (30)	Troy Rosario (12)	Jayson Castro (3)	Smart Araneta Coliseum	7–3

July: 1–0

Game	Date	Opponent	Score	High points	High rebounds	High assists	Location Attendance	Record
11	July 7	Rain or Shine	W 100–85	Joshua Smith (25)	Joshua Smith (13)	Terrence Romeo (12)	Smart Araneta Coliseum	8–3

=== Playoffs ===
==== Bracket ====
Quarterfinals
(#1 twice-to-beat)
1	Rain or Shine	113	103
8	GlobalPort	114	97
(Best-of-3)
4	Meralco	0
5	Barangay Ginebra	2
(#2 twice-to-beat)
2	Alaska	89
7	Magnolia	78
(Best-of-3)
3	TNT	0
6	San Miguel	2

Semifinals (Best-of-5)
1	Rain or Shine	1
5	Barangay Ginebra	3
2	Alaska	1
6	San Miguel	3

finals (Best-of-7)
5	Barangay Ginebra	4
6	San Miguel	2

==== Game log ====
2018 PBA Commissioner's Cup playoffs game log
Total: 0–2
Quarterfinals: 0–2

Game	Date	Opponent	Score	High points	High rebounds	High assists	Location Attendance	Series
1	July 9	San Miguel	L 110–121	Pogoy, Smith (17)	Castro, Smith (8)	Jayson Castro (9)	Smart Araneta Coliseum	0–1
2	July 11	San Miguel	L 102–106	Terrence Romeo (28)	Joshua Smith (18)	Jayson Castro (9)	Smart Araneta Coliseum	0–2

== Governors' Cup ==
=== Eliminations ===
==== Standings ====
Pos	Team	W	L	PCT	GB	Qualification
1	Barangay Ginebra San Miguel	9	2	.818	—	Twice-to-beat in quarterfinals
2	Phoenix Fuel Masters	8	3	.727 (Note: Head-to-head quotient: Phoenix 1.011, Alaska 1.006, Magnolia 0.982)	1	Twice-to-beat in quarterfinals
3	Alaska Aces	8	3	.727	1	Twice-to-beat in quarterfinals
4	Magnolia Hotshots Pambansang Manok	8	3	.727	1	Twice-to-beat in quarterfinals
5	Blackwater Elite	7	4	.636	2	Twice-to-win in quarterfinals
6	San Miguel Beermen	6	5	.545	3	Twice-to-win in quarterfinals
7	Meralco Bolts	5	6	.455 (Note: Head-to-head record: Meralco 1–0 NLEX)	4	Twice-to-win in quarterfinals
8	NLEX Road Warriors	5	6	.455	4	Twice-to-win in quarterfinals
9	TNT KaTropa	4	7	.364	5	
10	Rain or Shine Elasto Painters	3	8	.273	6	
11	NorthPort Batang Pier	2	9	.182	7	
12	Columbian Dyip	1	10	.091	8	

Source: PBA.ph
Rules for classification: 1) winning percentage; 2) if two teams are tied, head-to-head record; if three or more teams are tied, head-to-head goal average (quotient); 3) overall quotient 4) coin toss

==== Game log ====
2018 PBA Governors' Cup game log
Total: 4–7
August: 1–4

Game	Date	Opponent	Score	High points	High rebounds	High assists	Location Attendance	Record
1	August 17	NLEX	L 90–103	Terrence Romeo (27)	Mike Glover (15)	Jayson Castro (5)	Ynares Center	0–1
2	August 19	Meralco	W 92–90	Terrence Romeo (23)	Kelly Williams (9)	Terrence Romeo (10)	Ynares Center	1–1
3	August 24	Blackwater	L 98–104 (OT)	Terrence Romeo (24)	Stacy Davis (16)	Castro, Romeo (3)	Mall of Asia Arena	1–2
4	August 26	Alaska	L 96–125	Stacy Davis (26)	Stacy Davis (12)	Stacy Davis (7)	Smart Araneta Coliseum	1–3
5	August 31	Phoenix	L 82–112	Alfrancis Tamsi (14)	Stacy Davis (11)	RR Garcia (5)	Smart Araneta Coliseum	1–4

September: 3–0

Game	Date	Opponent	Score	High points	High rebounds	High assists	Location Attendance	Record
6	September 2	Columbian	W 118–114 (OT)	Jayson Castro (25)	Roger Pogoy (12)	Jayson Castro (7)	Smart Araneta Coliseum	2–4
7	September 22	Rain or Shine	W 110–104	Marqus Blakely (26)	Marqus Blakely (14)	Marqus Blakely (8)	City of Passi Arena	3–4
8	September 30	NorthPort	W 104–102	Terrence Romeo (26)	Marqus Blakely (11)	Terrence Romeo (8)	Smart Araneta Coliseum	4–4

October: 0–2

Game	Date	Opponent	Score	High points	High rebounds	High assists	Location Attendance	Record
9	October 20	San Miguel	L 96–107	Marqus Blakely (26)	Marqus Blakely (18)	Marqus Blakely (8)	Calasiao Sports Complex	4–5
10	October 26	Magnolia	L 103–116	Terrence Romeo (23)	Marqus Blakely (18)	Marqus Blakely (11)	Ynares Center	4–6

November: 0–1

Game	Date	Opponent	Score	High points	High rebounds	High assists	Location Attendance	Record
11	November 4	Barangay Ginebra	L 93–112	Marqus Blakely (23)	Marqus Blakely (15)	Jayson Castro (12)	Smart Araneta Coliseum	4–7

== Transactions ==
=== Trades ===
==== Preseason ====
November
November 28, 2017	To TNT Sidney Onwubere	To Phoenix Justin Chua; Jon Jon Gabriel

==== Philippine Cup ====
February
February 15, 2018	To TNT Jericho Cruz	To Rain or Shine Kris Rosales; Sidney Onwubere; 2018 PBA First Round Draft Pick
March
March 26, 2018	To TNT Don Trollano	To Rain or Shine Norbert Torres
April
April 3, 2018	To TNT Terrence Romeo; Yousef Taha	To GlobalPort Mo Tautuaa; 2020 1st Round Pick; 2021 2nd Round Pick

=== Recruited imports ===
Conference	Name	Country	Number	Debuted	Last game	Record
Commissioner's Cup	Jeremy Tyler	(United States)	1	April 22 (vs. GlobalPort)	May 13 (vs. Alaska)	3–1
Commissioner's Cup	Joshua Smith	(United States)	34	May 30 (vs. Columbian)	July 11 (vs. San Miguel)	4–4
Governors' Cup	Mike Glover	(United States)	1	August 17 (vs. NLEX)	August 17 (vs. NLEX)	0–1
Governors' Cup	Stacy Davis	(United States)	13	August 24 (vs. Blackwater)	August 31 (vs. Columbian)	1–3
Governors' Cup	Marqus Blakely	(United States)	23	September 22 (vs. Rain or Shine)	November 4 (vs. Barangay Ginebra)	2–3

== Awards ==
Recipient	Award	Date awarded	Ref.
Roger Pogoy	Philippine Cup Player of the Week	January 22, 2018	
Jericho Cruz	Philippine Cup Player of the Week	March 5, 2018	
Jayson Castro	Commissioner's Cup Player of the Week	May 10, 2018	
