= Norbert Torres =

Filipino-Canadian basketball player

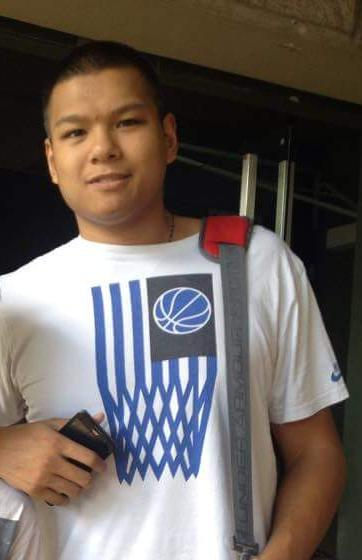
- Torres in 2015

No. 29 – Barangay Ginebra San Miguel
- Position: Center / power forward
- League: PBA

Personal information
- Born: January 12, 1990 (age 36) Toronto, Ontario, Canada
- Listed height: 6 ft 6 in (1.98 m)
- Listed weight: 265 lb (120 kg)

Career information
- High school: Blessed Mother Teresa Catholic (Toronto, Ontario)
- College: De La Salle
- PBA draft: 2015: 1st round, 8th overall pick
- Drafted by: Star Hotshots
- Playing career: 2015–present

Career history
- 2015–2016: Star Hotshots
- 2016–2017: Phoenix Fuel Masters
- 2017–2018: TNT KaTropa
- 2018–2023: Rain or Shine Elasto Painters
- 2023–2025: Meralco Bolts
- 2025–present: Barangay Ginebra San Miguel

Career highlights
- 2× PBA champion (2024 Philippine, 2026 Commissioner's); PBA All-Star (2017); UAAP champion (2013); PCCL champion (2013)

Norberto Brian Torres (born January 12, 1990) is a Canadian-born Filipino professional basketball player for the Barangay Ginebra San Miguel of the Philippine Basketball Association (PBA).

== High school career ==
Torres attended his secondary education at Blessed Mother Teresa Catholic Secondary School in Scarborough, Ontario, Canada.

== College career ==
Torres played college basketball for the De La Salle Green Archers in the UAAP. He was recruited out of high school in Canada and spent three years of residency before suiting up for the Green Archers in 2011. The next year (his second playing year in UAAP), he was the Archers' starting center, often paired with Fil-German center Arnold Van Opstal. With him and Van Opstal in the pivot spot manning the boards, they clinched the UAAP championship in 2013.

== Amateur career ==
In compliance with PBA D-League requirement for incoming PBA rookies, Torres suited up for the Cebuana Lhuillier Gems.

== Professional career ==
Torres was drafted 8th overall by the Star Hotshots in the 2015 PBA draft. In May 2016, Torres was traded by Star to Phoenix Fuel Masters in a three-team trade that also involved GlobalPort Batang Pier.

On May 18, 2023, Torres was traded to the Meralco Bolts for Mac Belo.

On September 6, 2025, Torres signed with the Barangay Ginebra San Miguel.

== PBA career statistics ==
Legend
GP	Games played	MPG	Minutes per game	FG%	Field-goal percentage
3FG%	3-point field-goal percentage	4P%	4-point field-goal percentage	FT%	Free-throw percentage
RPG	Rebounds per game	APG	Assists per game	SPG	Steals per game
BPG	Blocks per game	PPG	Points per game	127	Career high

As of the end of 2024–25 season

=== Season-by-season averages ===
Year	Team	GP	MPG	FG%	3P%	4P%	FT%	RPG	APG	SPG	BPG	PPG
2015–16	Star	27	9.9	.529	.536	—	.727	2.3	.2	.1	.2	3.6
2015–16	Phoenix	27	9.9	.529	.536	—	.727	2.3	.2	.1	.2	3.6
2016–17	Phoenix	24	14.7	.357	.107	—	.600	4.3	.4	.2	.5	3.5
2017–18	TNT	31	12.0	.387	.227	—	.594	3.5	.4	.3	.5	3.9
2017–18	Rain or Shine	31	12.0	.387	.227	—	.594	3.5	.4	.3	.5	3.9
2019	Rain or Shine	45	14.1	.377	.306	—	.727	2.4	.6	.2	.4	5.2
2020	Rain or Shine	12	12.4	.413	.300	—	.737	3.7	.3	.3	.4	4.8
2021	Rain or Shine	23	14.4	.434	.302	—	.792	2.8	.6	.2	.5	5.1
2022–23	Rain or Shine	31	14.4	.468	.416	—	.634	2.8	.6	.2	.3	6.5
2023–24	Meralco	28	10.0	.390	.310	—	.727	1.8	.3	.3	.3	2.9
2024–25	Meralco	22	9.7	.410	.267	—	.700	1.2	.3	.1	.3	3.0
Career		243	12.5	.414	.317	—	.678	2.7	.4	.2	.4	4.4

== International career ==
He was part of the Nokia-RP Youth team that won the Juniors SEABA title in 2008, and was named the tournament MVP. In 2015, he was a member of the 12-man Sinag Pilipinas lineup that competed in the 2015 Southeast Asian Games and 2015 SEABA Championship, both held in Singapore, where they won gold medals in both occasions.

== Personal life ==
Norbert's parents, Cirilo and Dinia Torres (née dela Cruz) both hail from Calumpit, Bulacan.
