= 2017–18 Rain or Shine Elasto Painters season =

- Head coach: Caloy Garcia
- Owners: Asian Coatings Philippines, Inc.

Philippine Cup results
- Record: 6–5 (54.5%)
- Place: 5th
- Playoff finish: Quarterfinalist (lost to Barangay Ginebra, 0–2)

Commissioner's Cup results
- Record: 9–2 (81.8%)
- Place: 1st
- Playoff finish: Semifinalist (lost to Barangay Ginebra, 1–3)

Governors' Cup results
- Record: 3–8 (27.3%)
- Place: 10th
- Playoff finish: Did not qualify

Rain or Shine Elasto Painters seasons

The 2017–18 Rain or Shine Elasto Painters season was the 12th season of the franchise in the Philippine Basketball Association (PBA).

== Key dates ==
=== 2017 ===
- October 29: The 2017 PBA draft took place in Midtown Atrium, Robinson Place Manila.

== Draft picks ==
Round	Pick	Player	Position	Nationality	PBA D-League team	College
1	8	Rey Nambatac	G	Philippines	Racal Tile Masters	Letran
2	7	Jomari Sollano	F	Philippines	Tanduay Light Rhum Masters	Letran
3	6	Michael Juico	G	Philippines	Wang's Couriers	San Sebastian

== Roster ==
2017–18 Rain or Shine Elasto Painters roster
Players
Coaches

Pos.	#	POB	Name	Height	Weight	DOB (YYYY–MM–DD)	From
F	1	(Philippines)	Sidney Onwubere (R)	6 ft 4 in (1.93 m)		1993–08–01	Emilio Aguinaldo
F	5	(United States)	Gabe Norwood (C)	6 ft 6 in (1.98 m)	190 lb (86 kg)	1985–02–09	George Mason
G	8	(Philippines)	Ed Daquioag	6 ft 0 in (1.83 m)	170 lb (77 kg)	1991–08–18	UST
F	12	(Philippines)	Dexter Maiquez	6 ft 3 in (1.91 m)	220 lb (100 kg)	1991–06–09	San Sebastian
G	13	(United States)	Maverick Ahanmisi	6 ft 2 in (1.88 m)	185 lb (84 kg)	1991–07–17	Minnesota
F/C	15	(Philippines)	Jewel Ponferada	6 ft 5 in (1.96 m)	211 lb (96 kg)	1988–07–08	National-U
F	16	(Philippines)	Mark Borboran	6 ft 4 in (1.93 m)	185 lb (84 kg)	1984–11–20	UE
G	17	(Philippines)	Chris Tiu	6 ft 0 in (1.83 m)	176 lb (80 kg)	1985–07–15	Ateneo
G/F	18	(Philippines)	James Yap	6 ft 2 in (1.88 m)	205 lb (93 kg)	1982–02–15	UE
C	20	(Philippines)	Raymond Almazan	6 ft 8 in (2.03 m)	194 lb (88 kg)	1989–08–02	Letran
F	23	(Philippines)	Jay Washington	6 ft 7 in (2.01 m)	210 lb (95 kg)	1981–10–10	Eckerd
G	27	(Philippines)	Rey Nambatac (R)	6 ft 0 in (1.83 m)		1994–01–27	Letran
F/C	29	(Canada)	Norbert Torres	6 ft 6 in (1.98 m)	250 lb (113 kg)	1990–01–12	De La Salle
F/C	30	(Philippines)	Beau Belga	6 ft 6 in (1.98 m)	235 lb (107 kg)	1986–11–30	Philippine Christian
F	33	(Philippines)	Ronnie Matias	6 ft 4 in (1.93 m)	180 lb (82 kg)	1983–11–29	Manila
G	40	(Philippines)	John Casiño (R)	5 ft 10 in (1.78 m)			Centro Escolar

Head coach

- (Philippines) Caloy Garcia

Assistant coach(es)

- (Philippines) Mike Buendia (1st Assistant)
- (Philippines) Jolly Escobar
- (Philippines) Ricky Umayam
- (United States) Don Dulay
- (Philippines) Matthew Makalintal

Team manager

- (Philippines) Mamerto Mondragon
- (Philippines) Jay Legacion (Assistant)

Legend

- (C) Team captain
- (CI) Commissioner's Cup Import
- (GI) Governors' Cup Import
- (EI) EASL Import
- (DP) Unsigned draft pick
- (FA) Free agent
- (IN) Inactive
- (S) Suspended
- (R) Rookie
- Injured

== Philippine Cup ==
=== Eliminations ===
==== Standings ====
Pos	Team	W	L	PCT	GB	Qualification
1	San Miguel Beermen	8	3	.727 (Note: Head-to-head record: San Miguel 1–0 Magnolia)	—	Twice-to-beat in the quarterfinals
2	Magnolia Hotshots Pambansang Manok	8	3	.727	—	Twice-to-beat in the quarterfinals
3	Alaska Aces	7	4	.636	1	Best-of-three quarterfinals
4	Barangay Ginebra San Miguel	6	5	.545 (Note: Head-to-head quotient: Barangay Ginebra 1.03, Rain or Shine 1.02, NLEX 0.95)	2	Best-of-three quarterfinals
5	Rain or Shine Elasto Painters	6	5	.545	2	Best-of-three quarterfinals
6	NLEX Road Warriors	6	5	.545	2	Best-of-three quarterfinals
7	GlobalPort Batang Pier	5	6	.455 (Note: Head-to-head quotient: GlobalPort 1.14, Phoenix 1.00, TNT 0.97, Blackwater 0.89; 8th seed playoff: TNT 118–97 Phoenix)	3	Twice-to-win in the quarterfinals
8	TNT KaTropa	5	6	.455	3	Twice-to-win in the quarterfinals
9	Phoenix Fuel Masters	5	6	.455	3	
10	Blackwater Elite	5	6	.455	3	
11	Meralco Bolts	4	7	.364	4	
12	Kia Picanto	1	10	.091	7	

Source: PBA.ph
Rules for classification: 1) winning percentage; 2) if two teams are tied, head to head record; if three or more teams are tied, head-to-head goal average (quotient), if tied for 8th, one-game playoff; 3) overall quotient 4) coin toss

==== Game log ====
2018 PBA Philippine Cup game log
Total: 6–5
December: 1–1

Game	Date	Opponent	Score	High points	High rebounds	High assists	Location Attendance	Record
1	December 22	TNT	W 82–79	Beau Belga (14)	Raymond Almazan (10)	Belga, Daquioag (3)	Cuneta Astrodome	1–0
2	December 29	Blackwater	L 87–92	Chris Tiu (14)	Raymond Almazan (11)	Belga, Tiu (4)	Cuneta Astrodome	1–1

January: 2–2

Game	Date	Opponent	Score	High points	High rebounds	High assists	Location Attendance	Record
3	January 12	GlobalPort	L 70–78	Gabe Norwood (15)	Beau Belga (9)	Maverick Ahanmisi (4)	Mall of Asia Arena	1–2
4	January 17	Phoenix	W 120–99	Ed Daquioag (21)	Beau Belga (7)	Chris Tiu	Smart Araneta Coliseum	2–2
5	January 20	Kia	L 94–98	Rey Nambatac (12)	Rey Nambatac (12)	Maverick Ahanmisi (4)	Cuneta Astrodome	2–3
6	January 26	NLEX	W 97–86	Maverick Ahanmisi (20)	Gabe Norwood (9)	Beau Belga (6)	Smart Araneta Coliseum	3–3

February: 3–1

Game	Date	Opponent	Score	High points	High rebounds	High assists	Location Attendance	Record
7	February 2	Meralco	W 90–84	Chris Tiu (18)	Beau Belga (13)	Chris Tiu (7)	Mall of Asia Arena	4–3
8	February 10	Magnolia	W 101–95	Raymond Almazan (23)	Maverick Ahanmisi (8)	Chris Tiu (6)	Calasiao Sports Complex	5–3
9	February 23	Alaska	L 95–99	Maverick Ahanmisi (23)	Raymond Almazan (9)	Maverick Ahanmisi (5)	Smart Araneta Coliseum	5–4
10	February 28	San Miguel	W 95–80	Beau Belga (19)	Maverick Ahanmisi (11)	Maverick Ahanmisi (7)	Mall of Asia Arena	6–4

March: 0–1

Game	Date	Opponent	Score	High points	High rebounds	High assists	Location Attendance	Record
11	March 2	TNT	L 92–100 (3OT)	Beau Belga (17)	Gabe Norwood (10)	Belga, Norwood (5)	Smart Araneta Coliseum	6–5

=== Playoffs ===
==== Bracket ====
Quarterfinals
(#1 twice-to-beat)
1	San Miguel	106
8	TNT	93
(Best-of-3)
4	Barangay Ginebra	2
5	Rain or Shine	0
(#2 twice-to-beat)
2	Magnolia	86
7	GlobalPort	79
(Best-of-3)
3	Alaska	0
6	NLEX	2

Semifinals (Best-of-7)
1	San Miguel	4
4	Barangay Ginebra	1
2	Magnolia	4
6	NLEX	2

Finals (Best-of-7)
1	San Miguel	4
2	Magnolia	1

==== Game log ====
2018 PBA Philippine Cup playoffs game log
Total: 0–2
Quarterfinals: 0–2

Game	Date	Opponent	Score	High points	High rebounds	High assists	Location Attendance	Series
1	March 5	Barangay Ginebra	L 80–88	Beau Belga (17)	Norwood, Ponferada (6)	Ahanmisi, Tiu (3)	Mall of Asia Arena	0–1
2	March 7	Barangay Ginebra	L 91–99	Maverick Ahanmisi (18)	Raymond Almazan (13)	Maverick Ahanmisi (5)	Smart Araneta Coliseum	0–2

== Commissioner's Cup ==
=== Eliminations ===
==== Standings ====
Pos	Team	W	L	PCT	GB	Qualification
1	Rain or Shine Elasto Painters	9	2	.818	—	Twice-to-beat in the quarterfinals
2	Alaska Aces	8	3	.727 (Note: Head-to-head record: Alaska 1–0 TNT)	1	Twice-to-beat in the quarterfinals
3	TNT KaTropa	8	3	.727	1	Best-of-three quarterfinals
4	Meralco Bolts	7	4	.636	2	Best-of-three quarterfinals
5	Barangay Ginebra San Miguel	6	5	.545 (Note: Head-to-head quotient: Barangay Ginebra 1.07, San Miguel 1.02, Magnolia 0.92)	3	Best-of-three quarterfinals
6	San Miguel Beermen	6	5	.545	3	Best-of-three quarterfinals
7	Magnolia Hotshots Pambansang Manok	6	5	.545	3	Twice-to-win in the quarterfinals
8	GlobalPort Batang Pier	5	6	.455	4	Twice-to-win in the quarterfinals
9	Columbian Dyip	4	7	.364 (Note: Head-to-head record: Columbian 1–0 Phoenix)	5	
10	Phoenix Fuel Masters	4	7	.364	5	
11	NLEX Road Warriors	2	9	.182	7	
12	Blackwater Elite	1	10	.091	8	

Source: PBA.ph
Rules for classification: 1) winning percentage; 2) if two teams are tied, head to head record; if three or more teams are tied, head-to-head goal average (quotient); 3) overall quotient 4) coin toss

==== Game log ====
2018 PBA Commissioner's Cup game log
Total: 9–2
April: 2–0

Game	Date	Opponent	Score	High points	High rebounds	High assists	Location Attendance	Record
1	April 27	Alaska	W 109–103 (OT)	Reggie Johnson (32)	Reggie Johnson (22)	Gabe Norwood (8)	Smart Araneta Coliseum	1–0
1	April 29	Barangay Ginebra	W 108–89	Raymond Almazan (20)	Reggie Johnson (15)	Chris Tiu (7)	Smart Araneta Coliseum	2–0

May: 3–1

Game	Date	Opponent	Score	High points	High rebounds	High assists	Location Attendance	Record
3	May 2	NLEX	W 98–97	Reggie Johnson (27)	Reggie Johnson (14)	Norwood, Tiu (5)	Ynares Center	3–0
4	May 9	Columbian	L 96–104	Reggie Johnson (30)	Reggie Johnson (17)	Gabe Norwood (6)	Mall of Asia Arena	3–1
5	May 13	San Miguel	W 123–119 (OT)	Reggie Johnson (27)	Reggie Johnson (19)	Chris Tiu (6)	Ynares Center	4–1
6	May 20	GlobalPort	W 96–90	Reggie Johnson (18)	Reggie Johnson (16)	Reggie Johnson (7)	Smart Araneta Coliseum	5–1
All-Star Break

June: 4–0

Game	Date	Opponent	Score	High points	High rebounds	High assists	Location Attendance	Record
7	June 2	Magnolia	W 99–96 (OT)	Reggie Johnson (23)	Reggie Johnson (18)	Johnson, Tiu (4)	Smart Araneta Coliseum	6–1
8	June 8	Blackwater	W 104–94	Raymond Almazan (26)	Reggie Johnson (20)	Chris Tiu (10)	Smart Araneta Coliseum	7–1
9	June 16	Phoenix	W 108–106	Reggie Johnson (32)	Reggie Johnson (16)	three players (5)	Mall of Asia Arena	8–1
10	June 24	Meralco	W 106–99 (OT)	Reggie Johnson (21)	Reggie Johnson (18)	Maverick Ahanmisi (6)	Smart Araneta Coliseum	9–1

July: 0–1

Game	Date	Opponent	Score	High points	High rebounds	High assists	Location Attendance	Record
11	July 7	TNT	L 85–100	Reggie Johnson (12)	Reggie Johnson (14)	three players (3)	Smart Araneta Coliseum	9–2

=== Playoffs ===
==== Bracket ====
Quarterfinals
(#1 twice-to-beat)
1	Rain or Shine	113	103
8	GlobalPort	114	97
(Best-of-3)
4	Meralco	0
5	Barangay Ginebra	2
(#2 twice-to-beat)
2	Alaska	89
7	Magnolia	78
(Best-of-3)
3	TNT	0
6	San Miguel	2

Semifinals (Best-of-5)
1	Rain or Shine	1
5	Barangay Ginebra	3
2	Alaska	1
6	San Miguel	3

finals (Best-of-7)
5	Barangay Ginebra	4
6	San Miguel	2

==== Game log ====
2018 PBA Commissioner's Cup playoffs game log
Total: 2–4
Quarterfinals: 1–1

Game	Date	Opponent	Score	High points	High rebounds	High assists	Location Attendance	Series
1	July 10	GlobalPort	L 113–114	Reggie Johnson (24)	Reggie Johnson (25)	Maverick Ahanmisi (8)	Smart Araneta Coliseum	0–1
1	July 12	GlobalPort	W 103–97	Reggie Johnson (29)	Johnson, Norwood (15)	Reggie Johnson (6)	Mall of Asia Arena	1–1

Semifinals: 1–3

Game	Date	Opponent	Score	High points	High rebounds	High assists	Location Attendance	Series
1	July 15	Barangay Ginebra	L 89–102	Reggie Johnson (30)	Reggie Johnson (13)	Belga, Tiu (4)	Smart Araneta Coliseum	0–1
2	July 19	Barangay Ginebra	W 109–100	Reggie Johnson (25)	Reggie Johnson (20)	Reggie Johnson (8)	Smart Araneta Coliseum	1–1
3	July 21	Barangay Ginebra	L 72–75	Reggie Johnson (13)	Reggie Johnson (22)	Belga, Johnson (4)	Mall of Asia Arena	1–2
4	July 23	Barangay Ginebra	L 94–96	Reggie Johnson (22)	Reggie Johnson (16)	Gabe Norwood (6)	Smart Araneta Coliseum	1–3

== Governors' Cup ==
=== Eliminations ===
==== Standings ====
Pos	Team	W	L	PCT	GB	Qualification
1	Barangay Ginebra San Miguel	9	2	.818	—	Twice-to-beat in quarterfinals
2	Phoenix Fuel Masters	8	3	.727 (Note: Head-to-head quotient: Phoenix 1.011, Alaska 1.006, Magnolia 0.982)	1	Twice-to-beat in quarterfinals
3	Alaska Aces	8	3	.727	1	Twice-to-beat in quarterfinals
4	Magnolia Hotshots Pambansang Manok	8	3	.727	1	Twice-to-beat in quarterfinals
5	Blackwater Elite	7	4	.636	2	Twice-to-win in quarterfinals
6	San Miguel Beermen	6	5	.545	3	Twice-to-win in quarterfinals
7	Meralco Bolts	5	6	.455 (Note: Head-to-head record: Meralco 1–0 NLEX)	4	Twice-to-win in quarterfinals
8	NLEX Road Warriors	5	6	.455	4	Twice-to-win in quarterfinals
9	TNT KaTropa	4	7	.364	5	
10	Rain or Shine Elasto Painters	3	8	.273	6	
11	NorthPort Batang Pier	2	9	.182	7	
12	Columbian Dyip	1	10	.091	8	

Source: PBA.ph
Rules for classification: 1) winning percentage; 2) if two teams are tied, head-to-head record; if three or more teams are tied, head-to-head goal average (quotient); 3) overall quotient 4) coin toss

==== Game log ====
2018 PBA Governors' Cup game log
Total: 3–8
September: 0–2

Game	Date	Opponent	Score	High points	High rebounds	High assists	Location Attendance	Record
1	September 22	TNT	L 104–110	J'Nathan Bullock (23)	Raymond Almazan (10)	J'Nathan Bullock (5)	City of Passi Arena	0–1
2	September 26	Magnolia	L 76–92	J'Nathan Bullock (15)	J'Nathan Bullock (10)	Maverick Ahanmisi (4)	Smart Araneta Coliseum	0–2

October: 2–6

Game	Date	Opponent	Score	High points	High rebounds	High assists	Location Attendance	Record
3	October 3	Alaska	L 89–106	Beau Belga (20)	Terrence Watson (13)	Belga, Nambatac (5)	Smart Araneta Coliseum	0–3
4	October 7	Blackwater	L 93–99	Maverick Ahanmisi (25)	Terrence Watson (14)	Belga, Nambatac (4)	Sta. Rosa Multi-Purpose Complex	0–4
5	October 13	Barangay Ginebra	W 104–97	Terrence Watson (29)	Terrence Watson (19)	Ed Daquioag (6)	Quezon Convention Center	1–4
6	October 17	NorthPort	W 120–98	Chris Tiu (23)	Beau Belga (12)	Maverick Ahanmisi (9)	Cuneta Astrodome	2–4
7	October 19	Columbian	L 84–100	Terrence Watson (18)	Terrence Watson (10)	Maverick Ahanmisi (4)	Ynares Center	2–5
8	October 21	Meralco	L 82–91	Norbert Torres (16)	Terrence Watson (13)	Maverick Ahanmisi (5)	Smart Araneta Coliseum	2–6
9	October 24	Phoenix	L 97–103	Chris Tiu (24)	Norbert Torres (8)	Ahanmisi, Norwood (4)	Cuneta Astrodome	2–7
10	October 27	San Miguel	L 97–109	Maverick Ahanmisi (26)	Terrence Watson (15)	Maverick Ahanmisi (6)	Alonte Sports Arena	2–8

November: 1–0

Game	Date	Opponent	Score	High points	High rebounds	High assists	Location Attendance	Record
11	November 3	NLEX	W 107–101	Chris Tiu (30)	Norbert Torres (13)	Chris Tiu (5)	Smart Araneta Coliseum	3–8

== Transactions ==
=== Free agency signings ===
Player	Date signed	Contract amount	Contract length	Former team
JK Casiño	April 29, 2018	Not disclosed	Not disclosed	None

=== Trades ===
==== Philippine Cup ====
February
February 15, 2018	To Rain or Shine Kris Rosales; Sidney Onwubere; 2018 PBA First Round Draft Pick	To TNT Jericho Cruz
March
March 26, 2018	To Rain or Shine Norbert Torres	To TNT Don Trollano

=== Recruited imports ===
Conference	Name	Country	Number	Debuted	Last game	Record
Commissioner's Cup	Reggie Johnson	(United States)	42	April 27 (vs. Alaska)	July 23 (vs. San Miguel)	11–6
Governors' Cup	J'Nathan Bullock	(United States)	35	September 22 (vs. TNT)	September 26 (vs. Magnolia)	0–2
Governors' Cup	Terrence Watson	(United States)	7	October 3 (vs. Alaska)	October 27 (vs. San Miguel)	2–6

== Awards ==
Recipient	Award	Date awarded	Ref.
Chris Tiu	Commissioner's Cup Player of the Week	April 30, 2018	
Chris Tiu	Governors' Cup Player of the Week	November 6, 2018	
