= Sidney Onwubere =

Filipino basketball player (born 1993)

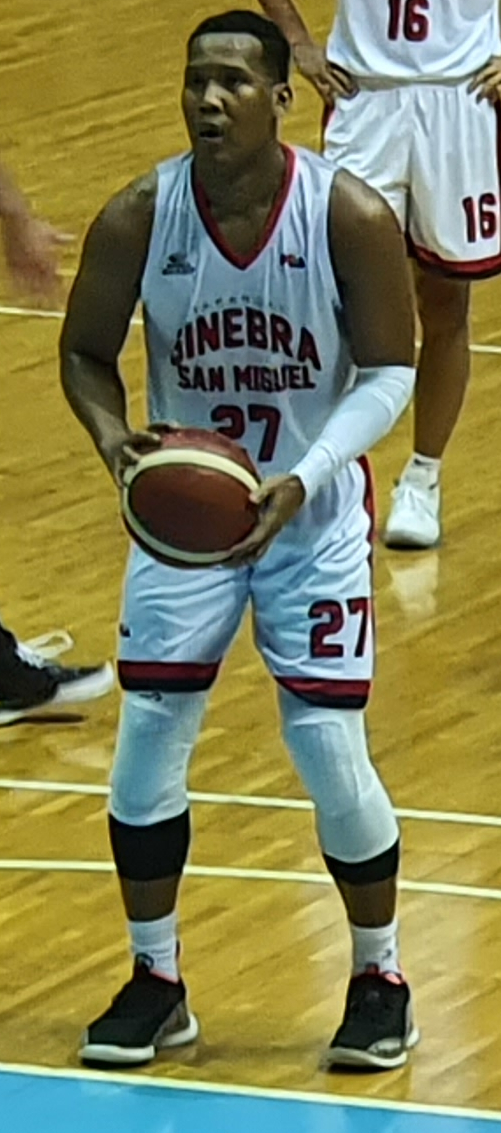
- Onwubere with the Barangay Ginebra San Miguel in 2021

No. 7 – Phoenix Super LPG Fuel Masters
- Position: Power forward
- League: PBA

Personal information
- Born: August 1, 1993 (age 33) Valenzuela, Philippines
- Listed height: 6 ft 4 in (1.93 m)

Career information
- High school: Immaculate Conception Academy (Dasmariñas, Cavite)
- College: EAC
- PBA draft: 2017: 1st round, 8th overall pick
- Drafted by: Phoenix Fuel Masters
- Playing career: 2017–present

Career history
- 2017–2018: TNT KaTropa
- 2018–2020: Rain or Shine Elasto Painters
- 2021: NorthPort Batang Pier
- 2021–2024: Barangay Ginebra San Miguel
- 2024–2025: NorthPort Batang Pier
- 2025–2026: NLEX Road Warriors
- 2026–present: Phoenix Super LPG Fuel Masters

Career highlights
- 2× PBA champion (2021 Governors', 2022–23 Commissioner's); NCAA Philippines Mythical Team (2017)

Sidney Nelson Onwubere (born August 1, 1993) is a Filipino-Nigerian basketball player for the Phoenix Super LPG Fuel Masters of the Philippine Basketball Association (PBA). He is played college basketball for the EAC Generals. He was selected by the Phoenix Fuel Masters in the 2017 PBA draft, but was traded to the TNT KaTropa the same day.

== Early life ==
Onwubere is the son of a Nigerian father and a Filipina mother. In high school, he played for the EAC-ICA Brigadiers, winning Defensive Player of the Year in the NCAA Season 87 Juniors' division, and earning a spot in the Mythical Team.

== College career ==
Onwubere moved up to the NCAA seniors' division, and played for the EAC Generals. In his rookie season, he was involved in a scuffle with Arellano guard James Forrester. He was given a one-game suspension. He only averaged 2.5 points, 2.8 rebounds in 10.7 minutes in 13 games in Season 89.

In Season 90, he had 15 rebounds, 10 points, and 2 blocks in a win against the Mapúa Cardinals.

In Season 91, the Generals got their first win after five games against the San Sebastian Stags, with Onwubere contributing 13 points and 14 rebounds. He was suspended one game for being involved in a parking lot altercation with players from a rival school. He led all players with 24 points and 9 rebounds in a loss to Arellano. The Generals finished dead last that season.

In Season 92, Onwubere had 18 points and 19 rebounds in a loss to the JRU Heavy Bombers. In their rematch, he led the Generals to the win with 26 points, nine rebounds, three assists, and three steals.

In Season 93, he had nine turnovers and a double-double of 11 points and 14 rebounds in a win over the CSB Blazers. In a win over Perpetual Altas, he finished with 21 points (with four being crucial free throws), 17 rebounds, three assists and a block after playing nearly 40 minutes of action in the win. He finished the first round of eliminations with averages of 14.9 points, 11.8 rebounds, 2.6 assists, and 1.9 blocks per game. In a win against the Bombers in the second round of eliminations, he had 28 points and nine rebounds. The Generals failed to make the Final Four, finishing with a 7–11 record. In his final season, Onwubere averaged 18 points, 12.4 rebounds, 2.9 assists, and 1.6 blocks, earning him a spot in the Mythical Five.

== Professional career ==
=== PBA D-League ===
Onwubere played for the Racal Tile Masters in the D-League. In the 2017 Aspirants' Cup, his team made it to the Finals, where they lost to the Cignal-San Beda Hawkeyes.

=== TNT KaTropa ===
Onwubere was selected by the Phoenix Fuel Masters in the 2017 PBA draft, but was traded to the TNT KaTropa the same day along with Justin Chua for Jonjon Gabriel and Phoenix's 2019 second round pick. He debuted with six points, nine rebounds and a steal off the bench. He was traded to the Rain or Shine Elasto Painters.

=== Rain or Shine Elasto Painters ===
Onwubere was traded along with Kris Rosales and a 2018 first-round pick in exchange for Jericho Cruz. He broke out in the 2020 PBA season, averaging 5.7 points and 3.6 rebounds in the elimination round. After that season, he was traded to the NorthPort Batang Pier.

=== NorthPort Batang Pier ===
On January 20, 2021, Onwubere, along with Clint Doliguez, was traded to the NorthPort Batang Pier for Bradwyn Guinto. He averaged a plus/minus of 7.8, good for fourth in the league.

=== Barangay Ginebra San Miguel ===
On November 9, 2021, Onwubere was traded to the Barangay Ginebra San Miguel for Arthur dela Cruz. He suffered a high ankle sprain in a game against the Magnolia Hotshots in the Governors' Cup, which put him out initially for the rest of the conference and the season. Despite the diagnosis, he recovered quickly enough to play again that conference. The following season, he suffered a slipped disc, which took him seven months to recover from. Although he won a title during the Commissioner's Cup, he only played one game during that conference.

=== Return to NorthPort ===
On July 15, 2024, Onwubere was traded back to NorthPort for Ben Adamos. He was released prior to the 2025–26 season.

=== NLEX Road Warriors ===
On November 15, 2025, Onwubere signed a two-conference deal with the NLEX Road Warriors.

== PBA career statistics ==
Legend
| GP | Games played | MPG | Minutes per game | FG% | Field-goal percentage |
| 3FG% | 3-point field-goal percentage | 4P% | 4-point field-goal percentage | FT% | Free-throw percentage |
| RPG | Rebounds per game | APG | Assists per game | SPG | Steals per game |
| BPG | Blocks per game | PPG | Points per game | 127 | Career high |

As of the end of 2025–26 season

=== Season-by-season averages ===
| Year | Team | GP | MPG | FG% | 3P% | 4P% | FT% | RPG | APG | SPG | BPG | PPG |
|---|---|---|---|---|---|---|---|---|---|---|---|---|
| 2017–18 | TNT | 18 | 7.3 | .371 | .278 | — | .333 | 1.5 | .3 | .6 | .2 | 1.8 |
| 2017–18 | Rain or Shine | 18 | 7.3 | .371 | .278 | — | .333 | 1.5 | .3 | .6 | .2 | 1.8 |
| 2019 | Rain or Shine | 20 | 5.0 | .278 | .167 | — | .313 | 1.0 | .2 | .3 | .1 | 1.4 |
| 2020 | Rain or Shine | 12 | 15.5 | .328 | .214 | — | .514 | 3.4 | .3 | .1 | .3 | 5.8 |
| 2021 | NorthPort | 25 | 18.8 | .413 | .263 | — | .524 | 3.7 | .9 | .5 | .5 | 6.4 |
| 2021 | Barangay Ginebra | 25 | 18.8 | .413 | .263 | — | .524 | 3.7 | .9 | .5 | .5 | 6.4 |
| 2022–23 | Barangay Ginebra | 17 | 4.3 | .364 | .300 | — | .500 | 1.2 | .1 | .2 | — | 1.2 |
| 2023–24 | Barangay Ginebra | 20 | 9.2 | .333 | .235 | — | .576 | 2.9 | .5 | .3 | .3 | 2.8 |
| 2024–25 | NorthPort | 35 | 14.6 | .427 | .205 | .429 | .529 | 3.4 | .7 | .3 | .3 | 5.0 |
| 2025–26 | NLEX | 6 | 10.2 | .250 | .250 | — | .750 | 2.2 | .5 | .2 | .5 | 3.0 |
| 2025–26 | Phoenix Super LPG | 6 | 10.2 | .250 | .250 | — | .750 | 2.2 | .5 | .2 | .5 | 3.0 |
| Career | | 153 | 11.2 | .379 | .236 | .429 | .521 | 2.5 | .5 | .3 | .3 | 3.7 |

== 3x3 basketball ==
Onwubere was also a member of the Team Manila roster for the 2016 FIBA 3x3 All Stars in Doha, Qatar. He played with Rey Guevarra, CJ Perez and Bright Akhuetie in this competition. The team finished seventh out of eight competitors.
