= Michael Miranda =

Filipino basketball player (born 1990)

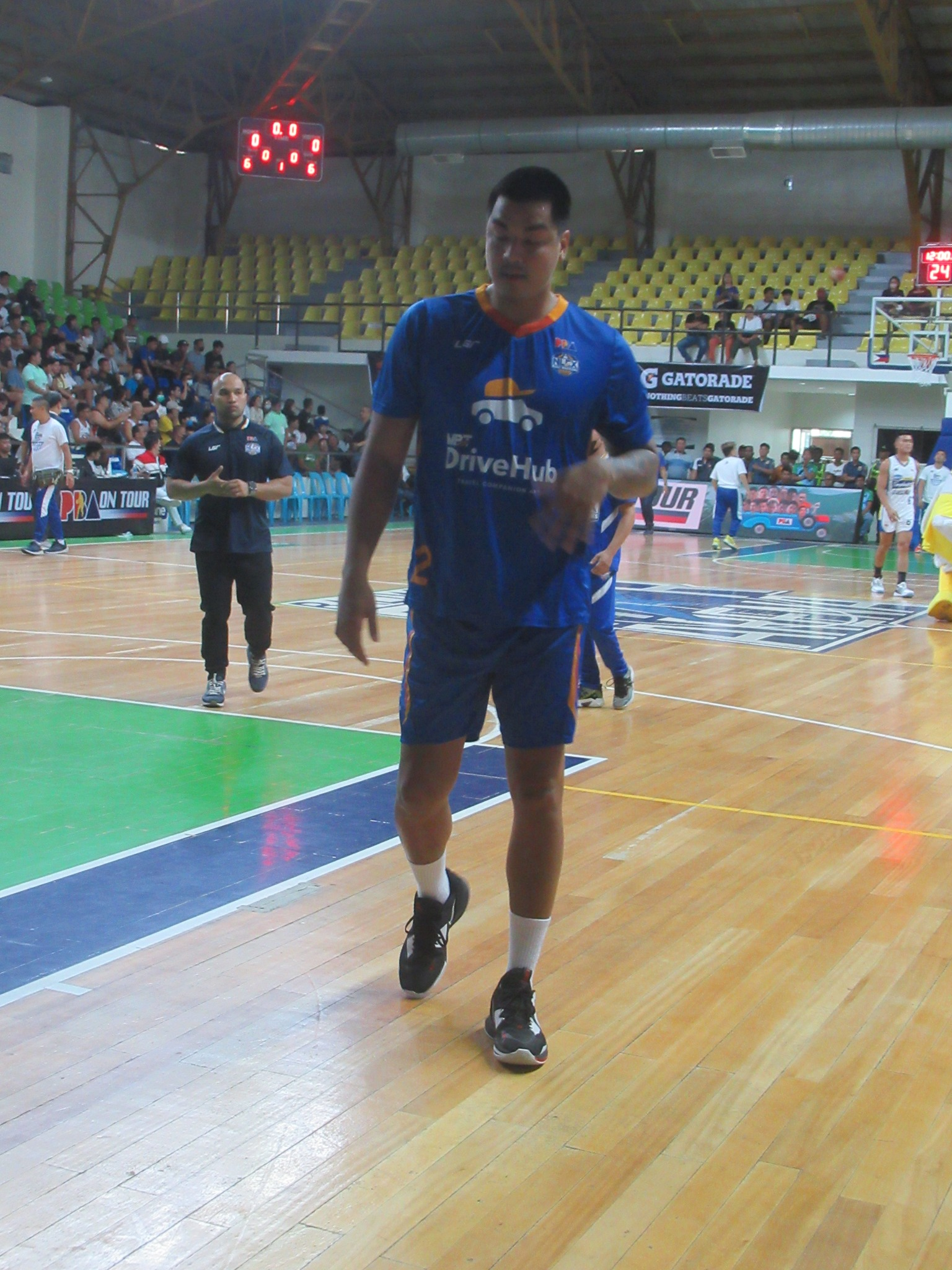

Free agent
- Position: Center

Personal information
- Born: December 12, 1990 (age 35) Santa Ana, Pampanga, Philippines
- Listed height: 6 ft 6 in (1.98 m)
- Listed weight: 210 lb (95 kg)

Career information
- High school: Holy Cross College Pampanga (Santa Ana, Pampanga)
- College: San Sebastian
- PBA draft: 2015: 2nd round, 21st overall pick
- Drafted by: Barako Bull Energy
- Playing career: 2015–present

Career history
- 2015–2016: Barako Bull Energy
- 2016–2017: Phoenix Fuel Masters
- 2017–2018: NLEX Road Warriors
- 2019: TNT KaTropa
- 2019–2026: NLEX Road Warriors

Michael Angelo Quiambao Miranda Sr. (born December 12, 1990) is a Filipino professional basketball player who last played for the NLEX Road Warriors of the Philippine Basketball Association (PBA). He was selected 21st overall by Barako Bull Energy in the 2015 PBA draft.

== College career ==
In college, Miranda played for the San Sebastian Stags alongside the "Pinatubo Trio" of Ronald Pascual, Ian Sangalang, and Calvin Abueva. He got into fights in his college career, including one in which he, four of his teammates, and a player from Emilio Aguinaldo College were ejected, and another instance where he and a total of eight players from San Sebastian and the San Beda Red Lions were thrown out.

== Professional career ==
=== Barako Bull Energy (2015–2016) ===
Miranda was selected 21st overall in the second round by Barako Bull Energy in the 2015 PBA draft.

=== Phoenix Fuel Masters (2016–2017) ===
In the 2016–17 Philippine Cup, he only scored 12 points for the entire conference, playing in eight games and averaging 4.3 minutes per game. For his career with the franchise, he only played 6.8 minutes per game in 39 games, averaging 1.9 points and 1.5 rebounds.

=== NLEX Road Warriors (2017–2018) ===
On November 9, 2017, Miranda was traded to the NLEX Road Warriors for a 2018 second-round pick. In a win over the KIA Picanto during the 2017–18 Philippine Cup, he had 14 points. Against the San Miguel Beermen, he kicked Chris Ross in the groin, leading to his suspension for one game, and a ₱20,000 fine.

In Game 1 of their quarterfinals series against the Alaska Aces, he had 10 points and three rebounds as NLEX took the win. He then scored 12 points and made a game-tying three pointer and the go-ahead free throws to send NLEX to its first-ever semifinals appearance. In Game 6 of the semis against the Magnolia Hotshots, he led the team with 20 points and eight rebounds, but Magnolia took the win, ending NLEX's playoff run. For his performance during the playoffs, NLEX gave him a contract extension.

During the 2018 Governors' Cup, he was suspended again for a flagrant foul against Phoenix's Eugene Phelps.

=== TNT KaTropa (2019) ===
On December 23, 2018, Miranda was traded to the TNT KaTropa in a three-team trade. During the 2019 Philippine Cup, in a game against Phoenix, he punched Justin Chua in the face. For his actions, he was suspended for one game and fined P30,000.

=== Return to NLEX (2019–2026) ===
On June 10, 2019, Miranda was traded to the NorthPort Batang Pier in a three-team trade. However, they put him in on their reserve list. Two months later, he was then traded back to NLEX for Juami Tiongson.

During the 2020 Philippine Cup, Miranda had a season-best 22 points in a rout of the Beermen. For the conference, he averaged 6.7 points and 4.4 rebounds as NLEX just missed the playoffs with a 5–6 record. In the offseason, NLEX gave him a new contract.

During the 2021 Governors' Cup, Miranda suffered an injury. This led to him missing several games. He was able to make an impact in his return during NLEX's semifinal series against Barangay Ginebra with his rebounding.

Miranda received another contract extension during the 2022–23 season. During the 2023 Governors' Cup, he sprained his ankle in a win over NorthPort.

In a close loss to TNT during the 2024 Philippine Cup, Miranda had 17 points and made all of his three triples. He continued his hot shooting into the 2024 Governors' Cup, where he averaged 16 points off the bench and made three four-pointers in his first two games despite coming off a back injury.

== PBA career statistics ==
Legend
GP	Games played	MPG	Minutes per game	FG%	Field-goal percentage
3FG%	3-point field-goal percentage	4P%	4-point field-goal percentage	FT%	Free-throw percentage
RPG	Rebounds per game	APG	Assists per game	SPG	Steals per game
BPG	Blocks per game	PPG	Points per game	127	Career high

As of the end of 2024–25 season

=== Season-by-season averages ===
Year	Team	GP	MPG	FG%	3P%	4P%	FT%	RPG	APG	SPG	BPG	PPG
2015–16	Barako Bull	20	7.7	.409	.200	—	.700	1.9	.2	.1	.1	2.3
2015–16	Phoenix	20	7.7	.409	.200	—	.700	1.9	.2	.1	.1	2.3
2016–17	Phoenix	22	5.7	.394	.222	—	.625	1.2	.2	.1	.1	1.5
2017–18	NLEX	38	19.4	.439	.330	—	.697	3.7	.7	.3	.4	6.6
2019	TNT	24	14.2	.278	.103	—	.833	2.2	.6	.2	.0	2.6
2019	NLEX	24	14.2	.278	.103	—	.833	2.2	.6	.2	.0	2.6
2020	NLEX	11	17.7	.500	.444	—	.727	4.4	1.0	.2	.2	6.7
2021	NLEX	19	17.7	.382	.389	—	.636	3.9	1.1	.2	.2	4.7
2022–23	NLEX	29	13.7	.284	.267	—	.778	2.2	.8	.2	.0	2.8
2023–24	NLEX	22	14.6	.444	.529	—	.786	2.3	.8	.1	.1	4.6
2024–25	NLEX	17	12.3	.395	.304	.462	1.000	1.8	.5	.2	.3	5.5
Career		202	13.9	.391	.313	.462	.724	2.6	.6	.2	.2	4.1
