= 2017–18 NLEX Road Warriors season =

- Head coach: Yeng Guiao
- Owners: Metro Pacific Investments Corporation (an MVP Group subsidiary)

Philippine Cup results
- Record: 6–5 (54.5%)
- Place: 6th
- Playoff finish: Semifinalist (lost to Magnolia, 2–4)

Commissioner's Cup results
- Record: 2–9 (18.2%)
- Place: 11th
- Playoff finish: Did not qualify

Governors' Cup results
- Record: 5–6 (45.5%)
- Place: 8th
- Playoff finish: Quarterfinalist (lost to Barangay Ginebra with twice-to-win disadvantage)

NLEX Road Warriors seasons

The 2017–18 NLEX Road Warriors season was the 4th season of the franchise in the Philippine Basketball Association (PBA).

== Key dates ==
=== 2017 ===
- October 29: The 2017 PBA draft took place in Midtown Atrium, Robinson Place Manila.

== Draft picks ==
| Round | Pick | Player | Position | Nationality | PBA D-League team | College |
|---|---|---|---|---|---|---|
| 1 | 2 | Kiefer Ravena | G | Philippines | | Ateneo |
| 2 | 13 | John Grospe | F | Philippines | Team Batangas; JRU Heavy Bombers | JRU |
| 3 | 26 | Gabriel Dagangon | G | Philippines | AMA Online Education Titans; Racal Tile Masters | Perpetual |

== Roster ==
2017–18 NLEX Road Warriors roster
Players
Coaches

| Pos. | # | POB | Name | Height | Weight | DOB (YYYY–MM–DD) | From |
|---|---|---|---|---|---|---|---|
| G | 0 | (Philippines) | Jonathan Uyloan | 6 ft 1 in (1.85 m) | 185 lb (84 kg) | 1983–11–26 | Golden West |
| G | 1 | (Philippines) | Emman Monfort | 5 ft 7 in (1.70 m) | 132 lb (60 kg) | 1989–07–02 | Ateneo |
| F/C | 2 | (Philippines) | Michael Miranda | 6 ft 6 in (1.98 m) | 210 lb (95 kg) | 1990–12–12 | San Sebastian |
| G | 3 | (Philippines) | Juami Tiongson | 5 ft 10 in (1.78 m) | 175 lb (79 kg) | 1991–02–05 | Ateneo |
| F | 5 | (Philippines) | Jansen Rios | 6 ft 3 in (1.91 m) | 185 lb (84 kg) | 1991–10–28 | Adamson |
| G | 6 | (Philippines) | Kevin Alas | 6 ft 0 in (1.83 m) | 175 lb (79 kg) | 1991–11–13 | Letran |
| G | 7 | (Philippines) | Bong Galanza | 6 ft 2 in (1.88 m) | 185 lb (84 kg) | 1992–12–21 | UE |
| G/F | 8 | (Philippines) | Cyrus Baguio | 6 ft 2 in (1.88 m) | 180 lb (82 kg) | 1980–08–19 | UST |
| G | 9 | (Philippines) | Philip Paniamogan | 6 ft 0 in (1.83 m) | 180 lb (82 kg) | 1991–05–30 | José Rizal |
| F/C | 10 | (Philippines) | Dave Marcelo | 6 ft 5 in (1.96 m) | 223 lb (101 kg) | 1989–02–22 | San Beda |
| G/F | 11 | (United States) | Alex Mallari | 6 ft 4 in (1.93 m) | 176 lb (80 kg) | 1987–03–26 | Lewis–Clark State |
| G/F | 12 | (Philippines) | Larry Fonacier (C) | 6 ft 3 in (1.91 m) | 170 lb (77 kg) | 1982–05–13 | Ateneo |
| G | 15 | (Philippines) | Kiefer Ravena (R) | 5 ft 11 in (1.80 m) | 180 lb (82 kg) | 1993–10–27 | Ateneo |
| C | 16 | (Philippines) | Raul Soyud | 6 ft 5 in (1.96 m) | 220 lb (100 kg) | 1991–01–14 | Philippines |
| F | 17 | (Philippines) | Kenneth Ighalo | 6 ft 2 in (1.88 m) | 175 lb (79 kg) | 1989–01–11 | Mapúa |
| F/C | 21 | (Philippines) | Alfonzo Gotladera | 6 ft 5 in (1.96 m) | 203 lb (92 kg) | 1992–02–16 | Ateneo |
| G | 26 | (Philippines) | Mark Tallo (R) | 5 ft 11 in (1.80 m) | | | Southwestern-U |
| F/C | 37 | (Philippines) | J. R. Quiñahan | 6 ft 5 in (1.96 m) | 235 lb (107 kg) | 1984–05–08 | Visayas |
| C | 88 | (Tonga) | Asi Taulava | 6 ft 9 in (2.06 m) | 245 lb (111 kg) | 1973–03–02 | BYU–Hawaii |

Head coach

- (Philippines) Yeng Guiao

Assistant coach(es)

- (Philippines) Adonis Tierra (1st Assistant)
- (Philippines) Claiford Arao
- (Philippines) Sandy Arespacochaga
- (Philippines) Jojo Lastimosa
- (Philippines) Jonas Mendoza
- (Philippines) Jaime Serrano

Team manager

- (Philippines) Ronald Dulatre
- (Philippines) Raymond Celis (Assistant)

Legend

- (C) Team captain
- (CI) Commissioner's Cup Import
- (GI) Governors' Cup Import
- (EI) EASL Import
- (DP) Unsigned draft pick
- (FA) Free agent
- (IN) Inactive
- (S) Suspended
- (R) Rookie
- Injured

== Philippine Cup ==
=== Eliminations ===
==== Standings ====
| Pos | Team | W | L | PCT | GB | Qualification |
|---|---|---|---|---|---|---|
| 1 | San Miguel Beermen | 8 | 3 | .727 (Note: Head-to-head record: San Miguel 1–0 Magnolia) | — | Twice-to-beat in the quarterfinals |
| 2 | Magnolia Hotshots Pambansang Manok | 8 | 3 | .727 | — | Twice-to-beat in the quarterfinals |
| 3 | Alaska Aces | 7 | 4 | .636 | 1 | Best-of-three quarterfinals |
| 4 | Barangay Ginebra San Miguel | 6 | 5 | .545 (Note: Head-to-head quotient: Barangay Ginebra 1.03, Rain or Shine 1.02, NLEX 0.95) | 2 | Best-of-three quarterfinals |
| 5 | Rain or Shine Elasto Painters | 6 | 5 | .545 | 2 | Best-of-three quarterfinals |
| 6 | NLEX Road Warriors | 6 | 5 | .545 | 2 | Best-of-three quarterfinals |
| 7 | GlobalPort Batang Pier | 5 | 6 | .455 (Note: Head-to-head quotient: GlobalPort 1.14, Phoenix 1.00, TNT 0.97, Blackwater 0.89; 8th seed playoff: TNT 118–97 Phoenix) | 3 | Twice-to-win in the quarterfinals |
| 8 | TNT KaTropa | 5 | 6 | .455 | 3 | Twice-to-win in the quarterfinals |
| 9 | Phoenix Fuel Masters | 5 | 6 | .455 | 3 | |
| 10 | Blackwater Elite | 5 | 6 | .455 | 3 | |
| 11 | Meralco Bolts | 4 | 7 | .364 | 4 | |
| 12 | Kia Picanto | 1 | 10 | .091 | 7 | |

Source: PBA.ph
Rules for classification: 1) winning percentage; 2) if two teams are tied, head to head record; if three or more teams are tied, head-to-head goal average (quotient), if tied for 8th, one-game playoff; 3) overall quotient 4) coin toss

==== Game log ====
2018 PBA Philippine Cup game log
Total: 6–5
December: 2–0

| Game | Date | Opponent | Score | High points | High rebounds | High assists | Location Attendance | Record |
|---|---|---|---|---|---|---|---|---|
| 1 | December 20 | Kia | W 119–115 | Kiefer Ravena (18) | Rabeh Al-Hussaini (8) | Kiefer Ravena (12) | Filoil Flying V Centre | 1–0 |
| 2 | December 25 | GlobalPort | W 115–104 | Kiefer Ravena (20) | J. R. Quiñahan (9) | Larry Fonacier (7) | Philippine Arena; 22,531 | 2–0 |

January: 0–4

| Game | Date | Opponent | Score | High points | High rebounds | High assists | Location Attendance | Record |
|---|---|---|---|---|---|---|---|---|
| 3 | January 7 | Phoenix | L 95–102 | Larry Fonacier (22) | Quiñahan, Taulava (9) | Kiefer Ravena (7) | Smart Araneta Coliseum; 9,000 | 2–1 |
| 4 | January 14 | Magnolia | L 94–105 | Kiefer Ravena (31) | J. R. Quiñahan (10) | Kiefer Ravena (5) | Smart Araneta Coliseum | 2–2 |
| 5 | January 19 | San Miguel | L 98–109 | Kiefer Ravena (15) | Michael Miranda (11) | Kiefer Ravena (6) | Cuneta Astrodome | 2–3 |
| 6 | January 26 | Rain or Shine | L 86–97 | J. R. Quiñahan (22) | Alex Mallari (9) | six players (3) | Smart Araneta Coliseum | 2–4 |

February: 4–1

| Game | Date | Opponent | Score | High points | High rebounds | High assists | Location Attendance | Record |
|---|---|---|---|---|---|---|---|---|
| 7 | February 3 | Barangay Ginebra | W 81–78 | Larry Fonacier (17) | Raul Soyud (10) | Kiefer Ravena (5) | Cuneta Astrodome | 3–4 |
| 8 | February 9 | Meralco | W 87–85 | Kiefer Ravena (21) | Alex Mallari (10) | Kiefer Ravena (4) | Cuneta Astrodome | 4–4 |
| 9 | February 11 | Alaska | W 96–89 | three players (15) | Alas, Baguio (8) | Kiefer Ravena (10) | Smart Araneta Coliseum | 5–4 |
| 10 | February 18 | Blackwater | W 93–90 | Kevin Alas (25) | Michael Miranda (9) | Kevin Alas (5) | Philippine Arena | 6–4 |
| 11 | February 28 | TNT | L 75–101 | J. R. Quiñahan (20) | Raul Soyud (11) | Cyrus Baguio (5) | Mall of Asia Arena | 6–5 |

=== Playoffs ===
==== Bracket ====
Quarterfinals
(#1 twice-to-beat)
1 | San Miguel | 106
8 | TNT | 93
(Best-of-3)
4 | Barangay Ginebra | 2
5 | Rain or Shine | 0
(#2 twice-to-beat)
2 | Magnolia | 86
7 | GlobalPort | 79
(Best-of-3)
3 | Alaska | 0
6 | NLEX | 2

Semifinals (Best-of-7)
1 | San Miguel | 4
4 | Barangay Ginebra | 1
2 | Magnolia | 4
6 | NLEX | 2

Finals (Best-of-7)
1 | San Miguel | 4
2 | Magnolia | 1

==== Game log ====
2018 PBA Philippine Cup playoffs game log
Total: 4–4
Quarterfinals: 2–0

| Game | Date | Opponent | Score | High points | High rebounds | High assists | Location Attendance | Series |
|---|---|---|---|---|---|---|---|---|
| 1 | March 5 | Alaska | W 105–99 | Kiefer Ravena (25) | J. R. Quiñahan (10) | Kiefer Ravena (8) | Mall of Asia Arena | 1–0 |
| 2 | March 7 | Alaska | W 87–83 | Kevin Alas (18) | Kevin Alas (9) | Kiefer Ravena (7) | Smart Araneta Coliseum | 2–0 |

Semifinals: 2–4

| Game | Date | Opponent | Score | High points | High rebounds | High assists | Location Attendance | Series |
|---|---|---|---|---|---|---|---|---|
| 1 | March 10 | Magnolia | W 88–87 | Cyrus Baguio (17) | J. R. Quiñahan (9) | J. R. Quiñahan (7) | Smart Araneta Coliseum | 1–0 |
| 2 | March 12 | Magnolia | L 84–99 | Mallari, Quiñahan (13) | Raul Soyud (6) | Kiefer Ravena (7) | Mall of Asia Arena | 1–1 |
| 3 | March 14 | Magnolia | L 99–106 | Kiefer Ravena (20) | Kevin Alas (9) | Quiñahan, Ravena (5) | Smart Araneta Coliseum | 1–2 |
| 4 | March 16 | Magnolia | W 91–79 | Kiefer Ravena (20) | Alas, Miranda (6) | Alas, Ravena (5) | Mall of Asia Arena | 2–2 |
| 5 | March 18 | Magnolia | L 78–87 | Kiefer Ravena (21) | Mallari, Soyud (9) | Cyrus Baguio (7) | Ynares Center | 2–3 |
| 6 | March 20 | Magnolia | L 89–96 | Michael Miranda (20) | Michael Miranda (8) | Cyrus Baguio (6) | Smart Araneta Coliseum | 2–4 |

== Commissioner's Cup ==
=== Eliminations ===
==== Standings ====
| Pos | Team | W | L | PCT | GB | Qualification |
|---|---|---|---|---|---|---|
| 1 | Rain or Shine Elasto Painters | 9 | 2 | .818 | — | Twice-to-beat in the quarterfinals |
| 2 | Alaska Aces | 8 | 3 | .727 (Note: Head-to-head record: Alaska 1–0 TNT) | 1 | Twice-to-beat in the quarterfinals |
| 3 | TNT KaTropa | 8 | 3 | .727 | 1 | Best-of-three quarterfinals |
| 4 | Meralco Bolts | 7 | 4 | .636 | 2 | Best-of-three quarterfinals |
| 5 | Barangay Ginebra San Miguel | 6 | 5 | .545 (Note: Head-to-head quotient: Barangay Ginebra 1.07, San Miguel 1.02, Magnolia 0.92) | 3 | Best-of-three quarterfinals |
| 6 | San Miguel Beermen | 6 | 5 | .545 | 3 | Best-of-three quarterfinals |
| 7 | Magnolia Hotshots Pambansang Manok | 6 | 5 | .545 | 3 | Twice-to-win in the quarterfinals |
| 8 | GlobalPort Batang Pier | 5 | 6 | .455 | 4 | Twice-to-win in the quarterfinals |
| 9 | Columbian Dyip | 4 | 7 | .364 (Note: Head-to-head record: Columbian 1–0 Phoenix) | 5 | |
| 10 | Phoenix Fuel Masters | 4 | 7 | .364 | 5 | |
| 11 | NLEX Road Warriors | 2 | 9 | .182 | 7 | |
| 12 | Blackwater Elite | 1 | 10 | .091 | 8 | |

Source: PBA.ph
Rules for classification: 1) winning percentage; 2) if two teams are tied, head to head record; if three or more teams are tied, head-to-head goal average (quotient); 3) overall quotient 4) coin toss

==== Game log ====
2018 PBA Commissioner's Cup game log
Total: 2–9
April: 0–1

| Game | Date | Opponent | Score | High points | High rebounds | High assists | Location Attendance | Record |
|---|---|---|---|---|---|---|---|---|
| 1 | April 28 | Columbian | L 103–123 | Adrian Forbes (26) | Adrian Forbes (17) | Larry Fonacier (6) | Ynares Center | 0–1 |

May: 2–3

| Game | Date | Opponent | Score | High points | High rebounds | High assists | Location Attendance | Record |
|---|---|---|---|---|---|---|---|---|
| 2 | May 2 | Rain or Shine | L 97–98 | Arnett Moultrie (24) | Arnett Moultrie (17) | Kiefer Ravena (8) | Ynares Center | 0–2 |
| 3 | May 4 | Meralco | L 90–106 | Arnett Moultrie (25) | Arnett Moultrie (17) | Kiefer Ravena (10) | Smart Araneta Coliseum | 0–3 |
| 4 | May 11 | Phoenix | W 120–115 (OT) | Arnett Moultrie (37) | Arnett Moultrie (17) | Larry Fonacier (9) | Alonte Sports Arena | 1–3 |
| 5 | May 16 | GlobalPort | L 94–116 | Kiefer Ravena (24) | Moultrie, Quiñahan (10) | J. R. Quiñahan (7) | Smart Araneta Coliseum | 1–4 |
All-Star Break
| 6 | May 30 | Blackwater | W 93–89 | Arnett Moultrie (26) | Arnett Moultrie (16) | Juami Tiongson (10) | Smart Araneta Coliseum | 2–4 |

June: 0–4

| Game | Date | Opponent | Score | High points | High rebounds | High assists | Location Attendance | Record |
|---|---|---|---|---|---|---|---|---|
| 7 | June 3 | TNT | L 106–117 | Arnett Moultrie (31) | Arnett Moultrie (14) | Alex Mallari (6) | Mall of Asia Arena | 2–5 |
| 8 | June 9 | Barangay Ginebra | L 85–93 | Arnett Moultrie (30) | Arnett Moultrie (19) | Alex Mallari (4) | Ibalong Centrum for Recreation | 2–6 |
| 9 | June 15 | Alaska | L 111–120 | Arnett Moultrie (34) | Arnett Moultrie (8) | Mallari, Tiongson (4) | Mall of Asia Arena | 2–7 |
| 10 | June 23 | San Miguel | L 114–125 | Arnett Moultrie (43) | Arnett Moultrie (14) | Jonathan Uyloan (11) | Calasiao Sports Complex | 2–8 |

July: 0–1

| Game | Date | Opponent | Score | High points | High rebounds | High assists | Location Attendance | Record |
|---|---|---|---|---|---|---|---|---|
| 11 | June 3 | Magnolia | L 89–116 | Olu Ashaolu (31) | Olu Ashaolu (12) | Cyrus Baguio (5) | Mall of Asia Arena | 2–9 |

== Governors' Cup ==
=== Eliminations ===
==== Standings ====
| Pos | Team | W | L | PCT | GB | Qualification |
|---|---|---|---|---|---|---|
| 1 | Barangay Ginebra San Miguel | 9 | 2 | .818 | — | Twice-to-beat in quarterfinals |
| 2 | Phoenix Fuel Masters | 8 | 3 | .727 (Note: Head-to-head quotient: Phoenix 1.011, Alaska 1.006, Magnolia 0.982) | 1 | Twice-to-beat in quarterfinals |
| 3 | Alaska Aces | 8 | 3 | .727 | 1 | Twice-to-beat in quarterfinals |
| 4 | Magnolia Hotshots Pambansang Manok | 8 | 3 | .727 | 1 | Twice-to-beat in quarterfinals |
| 5 | Blackwater Elite | 7 | 4 | .636 | 2 | Twice-to-win in quarterfinals |
| 6 | San Miguel Beermen | 6 | 5 | .545 | 3 | Twice-to-win in quarterfinals |
| 7 | Meralco Bolts | 5 | 6 | .455 (Note: Head-to-head record: Meralco 1–0 NLEX) | 4 | Twice-to-win in quarterfinals |
| 8 | NLEX Road Warriors | 5 | 6 | .455 | 4 | Twice-to-win in quarterfinals |
| 9 | TNT KaTropa | 4 | 7 | .364 | 5 | |
| 10 | Rain or Shine Elasto Painters | 3 | 8 | .273 | 6 | |
| 11 | NorthPort Batang Pier | 2 | 9 | .182 | 7 | |
| 12 | Columbian Dyip | 1 | 10 | .091 | 8 | |

Source: PBA.ph
Rules for classification: 1) winning percentage; 2) if two teams are tied, head-to-head record; if three or more teams are tied, head-to-head goal average (quotient); 3) overall quotient 4) coin toss

==== Game log ====
2018 PBA Governors' Cup game log
Total: 5–6
August: 3–1

| Game | Date | Opponent | Score | High points | High rebounds | High assists | Location Attendance | Record |
|---|---|---|---|---|---|---|---|---|
| 1 | August 17 | TNT | W 103–90 | Olu Ashaolu (33) | Olu Ashaolu (23) | J. R. Quiñahan (6) | Ynares Center | 1–0 |
| 2 | August 19 | NorthPort | W 123–107 | Olu Ashaolu (27) | Olu Ashaolu (13) | Alex Mallari (5) | Ynares Center | 2–0 |
| 3 | August 22 | Magnolia | L 72–102 | Olu Ashaolu (21) | Olu Ashaolu (9) | Ashaolu, Fonacier (3) | Smart Araneta Coliseum | 2–1 |
| 4 | August 29 | Columbian | W 116–104 | Aaron Fuller (35) | Aaron Fuller (21) | Aaron Fuller (7) | Smart Araneta Coliseum | 3–1 |

September: 1–1

| Game | Date | Opponent | Score | High points | High rebounds | High assists | Location Attendance | Record |
|---|---|---|---|---|---|---|---|---|
| 5 | September 1 | San Miguel | L 112–125 | Aaron Fuller (36) | Aaron Fuller (16) | Mark Tallo (9) | Smart Araneta Coliseum | 3–2 |
| 6 | September 26 | Blackwater | W 124–106 | Fonacier, Fuller (24) | Aaron Fuller (20) | Fonacier, Tallo (5) | Smart Araneta Coliseum | 4–2 |

October: 1–3

| Game | Date | Opponent | Score | High points | High rebounds | High assists | Location Attendance | Record |
|---|---|---|---|---|---|---|---|---|
| 7 | October 5 | Barangay Ginebra | L 92–106 | Larry Fonacier (21) | Aaron Fuller (19) | Aaron Fuller (4) | Smart Araneta Coliseum | 4–3 |
| 8 | October 10 | Phoenix | L 97–123 | Aaron Fuller (38) | Aaron Fuller (14) | Monfort, Tallo (5) | Cuneta Astrodome | 4–4 |
| 9 | October 14 | Meralco | L 105–108 | Aaron Fuller (31) | Aaron Fuller (13) | Aaron Fuller (6) | Smart Araneta Coliseum | 4–5 |
| 10 | October 26 | Alaska | W 116–110 (OT) | Aaron Fuller (42) | Aaron Fuller (22) | Philip Paniamogan (5) | Ynares Center | 5–5 |

November: 0–1

| Game | Date | Opponent | Score | High points | High rebounds | High assists | Location Attendance | Record |
|---|---|---|---|---|---|---|---|---|
| 11 | November 3 | Rain or Shine | L 101–107 | Aaron Fuller (29) | Aaron Fuller (12) | Aaron Fuller (7) | Smart Araneta Coliseum | 5–6 |

=== Playoffs ===
==== Bracket ====
Quarterfinals (Top 4 twice-to-beat)
1 | Barangay Ginebra | 111
8 | NLEX | 75
4 | Magnolia | 103
5 | Blackwater | 99
2 | Phoenix | 74 | 103
7 | Meralco | 90 | 108*
3 | Alaska | 96
6 | San Miguel | 85

Semifinals (Best-of-5)
1 | Barangay Ginebra | 1
4 | Magnolia | 3
7 | Meralco | 1
3 | Alaska | 3

Finals (Best-of-7)
4 | Magnolia | 4
3 | Alaska | 2

*Game went into overtime.

==== Game log ====
2018 PBA Governors' Cup playoffs game log
Total: 0–1
Quarterfinals: 0–1

| Game | Date | Opponent | Score | High points | High rebounds | High assists | Location Attendance | Series |
|---|---|---|---|---|---|---|---|---|
| 1 | November 6 | Barangay Ginebra | L 75–111 | Aaron Fuller (25) | Aaron Fuller (12) | Aaron Fuller (4) | Smart Araneta Coliseum | 0–1 |

== Transactions ==
=== Trades ===
==== Preseason ====
November
| November 6, 2017 | To NLEX Michael Miranda | To Phoenix 2018 2nd Round Pick (from TNT) |

=== Recruited imports ===
| Conference | Name | Country | Number | Debuted | Last game | Record |
|---|---|---|---|---|---|---|
| Commissioner's Cup | Adrian Forbes | (Jamaica) | 14 | April 28 (vs. Columbian) | April 28 (vs. Columbian) | 0–1 |
| Commissioner's Cup | Arnett Moultrie | (United States) | 23 | May 2 (vs. Rain or Shine) | June 23 (vs. San Miguel) | 2–7 |
| Commissioner's Cup | Olu Ashaolu | (Nigeria) | 55 | July 4 (vs. Magnolia) | August 22 (vs. Magnolia) | 2–2 |
| Governors' Cup | Olu Ashaolu | (Nigeria) | 55 | July 4 (vs. Magnolia) | August 22 (vs. Magnolia) | 2–2 |
| Governors' Cup | Aaron Fuller | (United States) | 23 | August 29 (vs. Columbian) | November 6 (vs. Barangay Ginebra) | 3–6 |

== Awards ==
| Recipient | Award | Date awarded | Ref. |
|---|---|---|---|
| Kiefer Ravena | Philippine Cup Player of the Week | December 27, 2017 | |
| Kiefer Ravena | Philippine Cup Player of the Week | February 12, 2018 | |
| Garvo Lanete | Philippine Cup Player of the Week | February 19, 2018 | |
| Mark Tallo | Governors' Cup Player of the Week | August 20, 2018 | |
