= 2009–10 B-Meg Derby Ace Llamados season =

- Head coach: Ryan Gregorio
- Owner(s): San Miguel Corporation

Philippine Cup results
- Record: 12–6 (66.7%)
- Place: 3rd (tied)
- Playoff finish: Champions (def. Alaska) 4–0

Fiesta Conference results
- Record: 13–5 (72.2%)
- Place: 3rd (tied)
- Playoff finish: Semifinals (by San Miguel 4–2)

B-Meg Derby Ace Llamados seasons

The 2009–10 B-Meg Derby Ace Llamados season was the 22nd season of the franchise in the Philippine Basketball Association (PBA). In the Philippine Cup, they were known as the Purefoods TJ Giants.

== Key dates ==
- August 2: The 2009 PBA Draft took place in Fort Bonifacio, Taguig.

== Draft picks ==
Round	Pick	Player	Height	Position	Nationality	College
1	3	Rico Maierhofer	6'6"	Power forward	Philippines	De La Salle

== Roster ==
2009–10 B-Meg Derby Ace Llamados roster
Players

Pos.	#	POB	Name	Height	Weight	DOB (YYYY–MM–DD)	From
F	1	(Philippines)	Rico Maierhofer	6 ft 6 in (1.98 m)	180 lb (82 kg)		De La Salle
C	4	(United States)	Rafi Reavis	6 ft 8 in (2.03 m)	210 lb (95 kg)		Coppin State
F/C	5	(Philippines)	Kerby Raymundo (C)	6 ft 7 in (2.01 m)	215 lb (98 kg)		Letran
G	8	(Philippines)	Peter June Simon	6 ft 1 in (1.85 m)	180 lb (82 kg)		Mindanao
G/F	9	(Philippines)	Niño Canaleta	6 ft 6 in (1.98 m)	210 lb (95 kg)		UE
F/C	10	(Philippines)	Rommel Adducul	6 ft 6 in (1.98 m)	220 lb (100 kg)		San Sebastian
G	11	(Philippines)	Paul Artadi	5 ft 9 in (1.75 m)	150 lb (68 kg)		UE
G/F	12	(Philippines)	Jonathan Fernandez	6 ft 1 in (1.85 m)	205 lb (93 kg)		National-U
G	13	(Philippines)	Roger Yap	6 ft 0 in (1.83 m)	170 lb (77 kg)		USJ–R
F	15	(Philippines)	Marc Pingris	6 ft 5 in (1.96 m)	215 lb (98 kg)		PSBA
G/F	18	(Philippines)	James Yap	6 ft 3 in (1.91 m)	205 lb (93 kg)		UE
G	31	(United States)	Chris Timberlake	5 ft 8 in (1.73 m)	167 lb (76 kg)		North Florida
F/C	41	(Philippines)	Don Allado	6 ft 6 in (1.98 m)	220 lb (100 kg)		De La Salle
F/C	61	(Philippines)	Jondan Salvador	6 ft 4 in (1.93 m)	215 lb (98 kg)		St. Benilde

Coaches

Head coach

- (Philippines) Jorge Gallent (Far Eastern)

Assistant coach(es)

- (Philippines) Ronnie Magsanoc (UP Diliman)
- (Philippines) Koy Banal (Mapúa)
- (Philippines) Rey Evangelista (UST)
- (Philippines) Dayong Mendoza (UP Diliman)

Legend

- (C) Team captain
- Injured

== Philippine Cup ==
=== Eliminations ===
==== Standings ====
Pos	Team	W	L	PCT	GB	Qualification
1	Alaska Aces	13	5	.722 (Note: Head-to-head record: Alaska 2–0 San Miguel)	—	Advance to semifinals
2	San Miguel Beermen	13	5	.722	—	Advance to semifinals
3	Purefoods Tender Juicy Giants	12	6	.667 (Note: Head-to-head record: Purefoods 1–1 Barangay Ginebra; Purefoods 0, Barangay Ginebra 0; overall point differential: Purefoods +85, Barangay Ginebra +75)	1	Advance to quarterfinals
4	Barangay Ginebra Kings	12	6	.667	1	Advance to quarterfinals
5	Talk 'N Text Tropang Texters	11	7	.611	2	Advance to quarterfinals
6	Sta. Lucia Realtors	10	8	.556	3	Advance to wildcard round
7	Coca-Cola Tigers	6	12	.333 (Note: Head-to-head record: Burger King 1–1, Coca-Cola; Burger King +10, Coca-Cola −10)	7	Advance to wildcard round
8	Burger King Whoppers	6	12	.333	7	Advance to wildcard round
9	Rain or Shine Elasto Painters	4	14	.222	9	Advance to wildcard round
10	Barako Bull Energy Boosters	3	15	.167	10	
—	Smart Gilas (G)	3	6	.333	5.5	Guest team (Note: Smart Gilas's results do not count in the standings.)

Source: PBA.ph
(G) Guests

==== Game log ====
===== Eliminations =====
2010 PBA Philippine Cup game log
October

Game	Date	Opponent	Score	High points	High rebounds	High assists	Location Attendance	Record
1	October 11	Burger King	93–80	Raymundo (19)	Reavis (20)	R. Yap (8)	Araneta Coliseum	1–0
2	October 18	Barangay Ginebra	87–95	J. Yap (21)	Raymundo (14)	J. Yap (5)	Araneta Coliseum	1–1
3	October 23	Barako Bull	92–77	Raymundo, J. Yap (17)	Raymundo (8)	Artadi (9)	Cuneta Astrodome	2–1
4	October 30	Coca Cola	79–93	J. Yap (15)	Raymundo, R. Yap (7)	R. Yap (4)	Araneta Coliseum	2–2

November

Game	Date	Opponent	Score	High points	High rebounds	High assists	Location Attendance	Record
5	November 8	Talk 'N Text	108–102	Maierhofer (20)	R. Yap (11)	Raymundo (7)	Araneta Coliseum	3–2
6	November 11	San Miguel	76–92	J. Yap (13)	R. Yap (8)	Artadi (5)	Araneta Coliseum	3–3
7	November 15	Rain or Shine	103–69	Maierhofer (15)	Pingris (12)	Artadi, Timberlake (4)	Araneta Coliseum	4–3
8	November 22	Alaska	87–101	Raymundo (25)	Reavis (14)	Raymundo, Artadi (4)	Araneta Coliseum	4–4
9	November 28	Sta. Lucia	68–63	Raymundo (15)	Pingris (12)	R. Yap (4)	Surigao del Norte	5–4

December

Game	Date	Opponent	Score	High points	High rebounds	High assists	Location Attendance	Record
10	December 2	Coca Cola	88–79	J. Yap (21)	Reavis (10)	Artadi (5)	Araneta Coliseum	6–4
11	December 6	Barangay Ginebra	89–81	R. Yap (21)	Reavis (11)	R. Yap (4)	Araneta Coliseum	7–4
12	December 9	Barako Bull	70–66	J. Yap (18)	Pingris (7)	J. Yap, Raymundo (5)	Araneta Coliseum	8–4
13	December 13	San Miguel	80–87	Raymundo (14)	Reavis (13)	Raymundo, J. Yap (3)	Araneta Coliseum	8–5
14	December 19	Talk 'N Text	98–101	J. Yap (28)	Reavis (10)	Raymundo (4)	Araneta Coliseum	8–6
15	December 25	Burger King	85–74	Raymundo (19)	Reavis (8)	R. Yap (5)	Cuneta Astrodome	9–6

January

Game	Date	Opponent	Score	High points	High rebounds	High assists	Location Attendance	Record
16	January 10	Rain or Shine	101–88	J. Yap (23)	Pingris (9)	Artadi (5)	Araneta Coliseum	10–6
17	January 15	Alaska	94–77	Maierhofer, J. Yap (15)	Reavis (14)	R. Yap (5)	Araneta Coliseum	11–6
18	January 17	Sta. Lucia	88–78	J. Yap (19)	Pingris (15)	Raymundo (7)	Araneta Coliseum	12–6

2009–10 schedule

===== Playoffs =====
2010 PBA Philippine Cup playoffs game log
Quarterfinals

Game	Date	Opponent	Score	High points	High rebounds	High assists	Location Attendance	Record
1	January 29	Rain or Shine	90–85	J. Yap (31)	Raymundo (11)	Artadi (5)	Araneta Coliseum	1–0
2	January 31	Rain or Shine	95–94	J. Yap (23)	Reavis (9)	J. Yap, R. Yap (3)	Araneta Coliseum	2–0
3	February 3	Rain or Shine	92–95	Canaleta (18)	Reavis (15)	Canaleta (6)	Araneta Coliseum	2–1
4	February 5	Rain or Shine	100–103	Raymundo (34)	Reavis (11)	R. Yap (7)	Araneta Coliseum	2–2
5	February 7	Rain or Shine	95–85				Araneta Coliseum	3–2

Semifinals

Game	Date	Opponent	Score	High points	High rebounds	High assists	Location Attendance	Record
1	February 10	San Miguel	83–99	Raymundo (18)	Pingris (10)	Pingris (3)	Araneta Coliseum	0–1
2	February 12	San Miguel	103–84	Reavis (20)	Reavis, Pingris (12)	R. Yap (4)	Cuneta Astrodome	1–1
3	February 14	San Miguel	76–88	Canaleta, J. Yap (14)	Reavis (7)	R. Yap (3)	Araneta Coliseum	1–2
4	February 17	San Miguel	97–84	J. Yap (24)	Reavis (14)	R. Yap (10)	Araneta Coliseum	2–2
5	February 19	San Miguel	94–82	Raymundo, R. Yap (18)	Raymundo, Maierhofer (8)	R. Yap (6)	Araneta Coliseum	3–2
6	February 21	San Miguel	87–78	R. Yap (20)	Pingris (13)	R. Yap (4)	Cuneta Astrodome	4–2

Finals

Game	Date	Opponent	Score	High points	High rebounds	High assists	Location Attendance	Record
1	February 24	Alaska	81–77	J. Yap (24)	Pingris (13)	R. Yap (5)	Araneta Coliseum	1–0
2	February 26	Alaska	86–85	J. Yap (32)	Raymundo, Reavis (7)	R. Yap (4)	Araneta Coliseum	2–0
3	February 28	Alaska	79–78	J. Yap (14)	Pingris (11)	Simon, J. Yap (3)	Araneta Coliseum	3–0
4	March 3	Alaska	86–76	J. Yap (18)	R. Yap (9)	R. Yap (6)	Araneta Coliseum	4–0

2009–10 schedule

== Fiesta Conference ==
=== Eliminations ===
==== Standings ====
Pos	Team	W	L	PCT	GB	Qualification
1	Talk 'N Text Tropang Texters	15	3	.833	—	Advance to semifinals
2	San Miguel Beermen	13	5	.722 (Note: Second seed playoff: San Miguel 88, Derby Ace 83)	2	Advance to semifinals
3	Derby Ace Llamados	13	5	.722	2	Advance to quarterfinals
4	Alaska Aces	11	7	.611	4	Advance to quarterfinals
5	Barangay Ginebra Kings	9	9	.500 (Note: Fifth seed playoff: Barangay Ginebra 115, Rain or Shine 88)	6	Advance to quarterfinals
6	Rain or Shine Elasto Painters	9	9	.500	6	Advance to wildcard round
7	Coca-Cola Tigers	8	10	.444	7	Advance to wildcard round
8	Sta. Lucia Realtors	5	13	.278	10	Advance to wildcard round
9	Air21 Express	4	14	.222	11	Advance to wildcard round
10	Barako Energy Coffee Masters	3	15	.167	12	

Source: PBA.ph

== Transactions ==
=== Pre-season ===
Purefoods Tender Juicy Giants

Players Added

Via Draft

- Rico Maierhofer

Via Trade

- Paul Artadi (From Barangay Ginebra)
- Niño Canaleta (From Burger King)
- Marc Pingris (From San Miguel)
- Rafi Reavis (From Barangay Ginebra)
- Chris Timberlake (From Barangay Ginebra)
Players Lost

Via Free Agency

- Topex Robinson
- Al Vergara (To Singapore Slingers)
- Richard Yee (To Burger King)

Via Trade

- Rich Alvarez (To Barangay Ginebra)
- Celino Cruz (To Barangay Ginebra)
- Paolo Bugia (To Barangay Ginebra)
- Enrico Villanueva (To Barangay Ginebra)

=== Imports recruited ===
Team	Player	Debuted	Final
Derby Ace Llamados	Lorrenzo Wade (1/3)	April 7, 2010	April 21, 2010
Derby Ace Llamados	Cliff Brown (2/3)	May 2, 2010	July 14, 2010
Derby Ace Llamados	Tony Washam (3/3)	July 16, 2010	August 1, 2010
