= 2009–10 PBA Philippine Cup finals =

Basketball cup finals

Team	Coach	Wins
(3) Purefoods TJ Giants	Ryan Gregorio	4
(1) Alaska Aces	Tim Cone	0
- Dates: February 24 – March 3, 2010
- MVP: James Yap
- Television: Solar TV, BTV
- Announcers: See broadcast notes
- Radio network: DZRJ-AM
- Announcers: See broadcast notes

Referees
- Game 1: Quilinguen, Balao, Sambrano, N.
- Game 2: Maurillo, Ngo, Aldaba
- Game 3: Mangibin R., Quilinguen, Herrera
- Game 4: Aldaba, Balao, Pascual

PBA Philippine Cup finals chronology
- < 2008–09 2010–11 >

PBA finals chronology
- < 2009 Fiesta 2010 Fiesta >

The 2009–10 PBA Philippine Cup finals was the championship basketball best-of-7 series of the 2009–10 PBA Philippine Cup, and the conclusion of the conference's playoffs. The Alaska Aces and the Purefoods Tender Juicy Giants played for the 98th championship contested by the league.

The two franchises were in their seventh finals match-up, with both teams splitting the six finals series winning three each. However, Purefoods swept Alaska 4–0 to win their eighth PBA title, and only the third best-of-seven sweep in league history. James Yap was named Best Player of the Conference and finals MVP.

== Background ==
=== Purefoods Tender Juicy Giants ===
The Giants finished third in the elimination round, outlasted the Rain or Shine Elasto Painters in the quarterfinals in five games, and defeated the #2 seed and sister team San Miguel Beermen in six games after trailing the series 1–2.

=== Alaska Aces ===
The Aces qualified after beating the Barangay Ginebra Kings in the semifinals via a 4–0 sweep; they previously qualified to the semifinals after posting the best record after the elimination round.

=== Road to the finals ===
Purefoods		Alaska Aces
Finished 12–6 (.667)–tied for 3rd	Elimination round	Finishes 13–5 (.722)—1st
1–1 and even point differential vs. Barangay Ginebra, +85 in overall point differential over Ginebra's +75	Tiebreaker	Finishes 13–5 (.722)—1st
Bye	Wildcard phase	Bye
Def. Rain or Shine, 3–2	Quarterfinals	Bye
Def. San Miguel, 4–2	Semifinals	Def. Barangay Ginebra, 4–0

== Series summary ==
Team	Game 1	Game 2	Game 3	Game 4	Wins
Purefoods	81	86	79	86	4
Alaska	77	85	78	76	0
	Araneta	Araneta	Araneta	Araneta

=== Game 1 ===
Solar TV

February 24
7:30 p.m.

boxscore

Purefoods Tender Juicy Giants 81, Alaska Aces 77
Scoring by quarter: 15–19, 21–17, 25–22, 20–17
Pts: J. Yap 24; Rebs: Pingris 13; Asts: R. Yap 5	Pts: Miller 23; Rebs: Thoss 14; Asts: Hugnatan, Miller 4
Purefoods leads series, 1–0

Araneta Coliseum, Quezon City
Referees: Quilinguen, Balao, Sambrano

The first half was contested tightly, Alaska led 19–15 after the first, then the two teams ending up tied at halftime. Purefoods star players James Yap and Kerby Raymundo had to sit the majority of the third quarter due to foul trouble, but the Giants only trailed by three after the third period. In the fourth quarter, Purefoods had an early surge to put them up by seven; Alaska cut the lead and tied the game midway the quarter at 72–all off a Reynel Hugnatan lay-up. Rafi Reavis scored all of his six points in the succeeding possessions to put the Giants up 78–74, then he blocked Willie Miller's shot at the other end. Roger Yap missed a jumpshot, but Reavis scored in a tip-in to put Purefoods up by six. Miller scored a three-pointer to cut the lead by three with eleven seconds left, but Niño Canaleta split his free throws to put Purefoods up for good.

=== Game 2 ===
Solar TV

February 26
7:00 p.m.

boxscore

Purefoods Tender Juicy Giants 86, Alaska Aces 85
Scoring by quarter: 28–18, 20–21, 9–23, 29–23
Pts: J. Yap 32; Rebs: Raymundo, Reavis 7 Asts: R. Yap 4	Pts: Tenorio 19; Rebs: Devance 10; Asts: Miller, Tenorio 5
Purefoods leads series, 2–0

Araneta Coliseum, Quezon City
Referees: Maurillo, Ngo, Aldaba

Purefoods had a good first half, racing to a nine-point lead at halftime, with Reavis scoring 13 of his 17 points during the first half. The Aces stormed back in the third quarter, leading 62–57, then padding their lead to 14 with five minutes left in the final period, capped off by a Brandon Cablay three-pointer. James Yap then spearheaded a 19–6 run to take over the game; Yap scored two consecutive three-pointers to cut Alaska's lead to six, 78–72. Raymundo also scored his own three-pointer during the run, while LA Tenorio maintained Alaska's 82–76 six-point lead with a jumper. James Yap converted both of his free throws to give Purefoods their first taste of the lead with 14 seconds left. Joe Devance was fouled and split his free throws to tie the game at 85–all. In the ensuing play, referee Raymundo Maurillo called a foul on Devance that elicited furious protests from Alaska head coach Tim Cone and team manager Joaqui Trillo. With 1.7 seconds left, Raymundo converted the first, and intentionally missed the second, leading to a long rebound as time expired.

Alaska team owner Wilfred Steven Uytengsu sent a text message to league commissioner Sonny Barrios, saying "I cannot condone Talk 'N Text's walkout (in the semifinals), but I can certainly feel their pain and point of view after that last call. It was most disappointing."

While the game was ongoing, an Alaska fan suffered a heart attack with under two minutes left that caused the game to be delayed momentarily. After the game, Trillo said they won't protest the result of the game.

=== Game 3 ===
Solar TV

February 28
6:00 p.m.

boxscore

Purefoods Tender Juicy Giants 79, Alaska Aces 78
Scoring by quarter: 15–21, 21–23, 25–23, 18–11
Pts: J. Yap 14; Rebs: Pingris 11; Asts: Simon, J. Yap 3 each	Pts: Miller 20; Rebs: Devance 10; Asts: Miller, Tenorio 5
Purefoods leads series, 3–0

Araneta Coliseum, Quezon City
Attendance: 14,016
Referees: Mangibin R., Quilinguen, Herrera

The Aces erected a 13-point lead midway the third quarter, but Purefoods had a fourth quarter rally to close the gap. Niño Canaleta opened the fourth quarter with a slam dunk and a three pointer to cut the lead to three points; John Ferriols and Tony dela Cruz both converted jump shots to add Alaska lead but Purefoods then scored the next seven points to tie game. Miller beat the 24-second shot clock with a jumper to put Alaska up by three, but then Canaleta scored on a three-point shot to tie the game anew; then Canaleta missed a hurried three-pointer with Purefoods now leading by a point. Joe Devance missed a forced shot, and Miller's drive to basket was well-contested leading to another miss as Purefoods held on to take a 3–0 lead.

=== Game 4 ===
Solar TV

March 3
7:00 p.m.

Purefoods Tender Juicy Giants 86, Alaska Aces 76
Scoring by quarter: 21–15, 19–25, 25–18, 21–18
Pts: J. Yap 18; Rebs: R. Yap 9 Asts: R. Yap 6	Pts: Thoss 19; Rebs: Thoss 12; Asts: Tenorio 6
Purefoods wins series, 4–0

Araneta Coliseum, Quezon City
Attendance: 16,879
Referees: Aldaba, Balao, Pascual

Prior to the game, James Yap was awarded his first Best Player of the Philippine Cup award.

Purefoods raced to two 13-point leads in the third period, but Alaska had a 10–0 run, with LA Tenorio scoring seven points to tie the score with 2.1 seconds left at the second quarter. With seven minutes left in the third quarter, Purefoods had their own 9–0 run to lead 57–48. Alaska managed to cut the lead to three, but Purefoods replied with their own with a 9–2 run to lead by 12 points with 4:27 left in the game. Purefoods will not relinquish the lead, and they won their seventh consecutive game since game 4 of the semifinals to clinch the championship.

== Awards ==
- Philippine Cup holders: Purefoods Tender Juicy Giants
- Finals MVP: James Yap
- Best Player of the Conference James Yap

== Rosters ==
Purefoods Tender Juicy Giants roster
Players

Pos.	#	POB	Name	Height	Weight	DOB (YYYY–MM–DD)	From
F	1	(Philippines)	Rico Maierhofer	6 ft 6 in (1.98 m)	220 lb (100 kg)		De La Salle
C	4	(United States)	Rafi Reavis	6 ft 8 in (2.03 m)	210 lb (95 kg)		Coppin State
F/C	5	(Philippines)	Kerby Raymundo (C)	6 ft 7 in (2.01 m)	215 lb (98 kg)		Letran
G	8	(Philippines)	Peter June Simon	6 ft 1 in (1.85 m)	180 lb (82 kg)		Mindanao
G/F	9	(Philippines)	Niño Canaleta	6 ft 5 in (1.96 m)	210 lb (95 kg)		UE
F/C	10	(Philippines)	Rommel Adducul	6 ft 6 in (1.98 m)	220 lb (100 kg)		San Sebastian
G	11	(Philippines)	Paul Artadi	5 ft 7 in (1.70 m)	150 lb (68 kg)		UE
G/F	12	(Philippines)	Jonathan Fernandez	6 ft 1 in (1.85 m)	205 lb (93 kg)		National-U
G	13	(Philippines)	Roger Yap	6 ft 0 in (1.83 m)	170 lb (77 kg)		USJ–R
F	15	(Philippines)	Marc Pingris	6 ft 5 in (1.96 m)	215 lb (98 kg)		PSBA
G/F	18	(Philippines)	James Yap	6 ft 3 in (1.91 m)	205 lb (93 kg)		UE
G	31	(United States)	Chris Timberlake	5 ft 8 in (1.73 m)	167 lb (76 kg)		North Florida
F/C	41	(Philippines)	Don Allado	6 ft 6 in (1.98 m)	220 lb (100 kg)		De La Salle
F/C	61	(Philippines)	Jondan Salvador	6 ft 3 in (1.91 m)	215 lb (98 kg)		St. Benilde

Coaches
Head coach
- (Philippines) Ryan Gregorio (UP Diliman)
Assistant(s)
- (Philippines) Ronnie Magsanoc (UP Diliman)
- (Philippines) Koy Banal (Mapúa)
- (Philippines) Jorge Gallent (Far Eastern)
- (Philippines) Rey Evangelista (UST)
- (Philippines) Dayong Mendoza (UP Diliman)

Legend
- (DP) Unsigned draft pick
- (FA) Free agent
- (S) Suspended
- Injured

Alaska Aces roster
Players

Pos.	#	POB	Name	Height	Weight	DOB (YYYY–MM–DD)	From
G	5	(Philippines)	LA Tenorio	5 ft 8 in (1.73 m)	151 lb (68 kg)		Ateneo
C	7	(Papua New Guinea)	Sonny Thoss	6 ft 7 in (2.01 m)	205 lb (93 kg)		James Cook
G	8	(Philippines)	Kelvin dela Peña	6 ft 0 in (1.83 m)	180 lb (82 kg)		Mapúa
F	10	(Philippines)	Mark Borboran	6 ft 4 in (1.93 m)	180 lb (82 kg)		UE
G/F	12	(Philippines)	Larry Fonacier	6 ft 2 in (1.88 m)	170 lb (77 kg)		Ateneo
G	13	(Philippines)	Miller, Willie	5 ft 11 in (1.80 m)	195 lb (88 kg)		Letran
G	18	(Philippines)	Ariel Capus	6 ft 1 in (1.85 m)	210 lb (95 kg)		José Rizal
F	21	(Philippines)	Reynel Hugnatan	6 ft 4 in (1.93 m)	210 lb (95 kg)		Manila
G	22	(Philippines)	Jeffrey Cariaso (C)	6 ft 1 in (1.85 m)	180 lb (82 kg)		Sonoma State
G	24	(United States)	Brandon Cablay	6 ft 0 in (1.83 m)	165 lb (75 kg)		Vanguard
C	30	(Philippines)	Ervin Sotto	6 ft 7 in (2.01 m)	210 lb (95 kg)		Saint Francis of Assisi
F	35	(United States)	Tony dela Cruz	6 ft 4 in (1.93 m)	209 lb (95 kg)		UC Irvine
F/C	38	(United States)	Joe Devance	6 ft 7 in (2.01 m)	220 lb (100 kg)		UTEP
F/C	55	(Philippines)	John Ferriols	6 ft 5 in (1.96 m)	210 lb (95 kg)		USJ–R
F	63	(Switzerland)	Michael Burtscher	6 ft 6 in (1.98 m)	220 lb (100 kg)		San Beda
C	21	(Philippines)	Samigue Eman	6 ft 9 in (2.06 m)	239 lb (108 kg)		Mindanao

Coaches
Head coach
- (United States) Tim Cone (James Madison)
Assistant(s)
- (Philippines) Joel Banal (Mapúa)
- (Philippines) Dickie Bachmann (De La Salle)
- (Philippines) Jojo Lastimosa (Ateneo)
- (Philippines) Luigi Trillo (De La Salle)
- (Philippines) Bong Hawkins (UPHSD)

Legend
- (DP) Unsigned draft pick
- (FA) Free agent
- (S) Suspended
- Injured

== Broadcast notes ==
Game	Play-by-play	Analyst	Courtside reporters
Game 1	Mico Halili	Alex Compton and Quinito Henson	Magoo Marjon
Game 2	Richard del Rosario	Norman Black	Magoo Marjon and Chiqui Reyes
Game 3	Vitto Lazatin	Danny Francisco	Patricia Bermudez-Hizon and Jinno Rufino
Game 4	Sev Sarmienta	Andy Jao	Dominic Uy and Chiqui Reyes
