= Kerby Raymundo =

Filipino basketball player (born 1981)

Ateneo Blue Eagles
- Title: Assistant Coach
- League: UAAP

Personal information
- Born: January 19, 1981 (age 45) Orion, Bataan, Philippines
- Listed height: 6 ft 6 in (1.98 m)
- Listed weight: 215 lb (98 kg)

Career information
- High school: Jose Rizal Institute (Orion, Bataan)
- College: Letran
- PBA draft: 2000: Elevated
- Drafted by: Batang Red Bull Energizers
- Playing career: 2000–2013
- Position: Power forward
- Coaching career: 2015–present

Career history

Playing
- 2000–2001: Red Bull Barako
- 2002–2012: Purefoods Chunkee Giants/B-Meg Llamados
- 2012–2013: Barangay Ginebra San Miguel

Coaching
- 2015: Letran (assistant)
- 2026–present: Ateneo (assistant)

Career highlights
- As player: 4x PBA champion (2001 Commissioner's, 2002 Governors', 2006 Philippine, 2009–10 Philippine); PBA Finals MVP (2002 Governors'); 9x PBA All-Star (2001, 2003–2009, 2011); PBA Mythical First Team (2006); 2x PBA Mythical Second Team (2002, 2008); 50 Greatest Players in PBA History (2015 selection); NCAA Most Valuable Player (1999); NCAA Rookie of the Year (1997); NCAA Finals Most Valuable Player (1999); 2× NCAA Champion (1998, 1999); As coach: NCAA champion (2015)

Kerby Mariano Raymundo (born January 19, 1981) is a Filipino former professional basketball player. He last played for the Barangay Ginebra San Miguel of the Philippine Basketball Association (PBA). Known as The Kid, he was a former star player with the Letran Knights during his NCAA years He is currently serving as an assistant coach for the Ateneo Blue Eagles in the University Athletic Association of the Philippines (UAAP).

== Amateur career ==
It was only in Raymundo's junior year in Jose Rizal Institute (High school) that he started playing basketball. He was discovered by Manuel "Molet" Pineda, a former Colegio de San Juan de Letran player and coach.

Raymundo played for Letran in the NCAA from 1997 to 1999 and made significant impact for the Knights alongside future PBA players Chris Calaguio and Willie Miller. From 1998 to 1999, he was a member of the Knights' back-to-back NCAA championships with victories over five-peat champion San Sebastian Stags and the JRU Heavy Bombers, respectively. He was named NCAA MVP in 1999. He also played for the Philippine national team in the 1999 Southeast Asian Games as the country won the gold medal.

He played for Red Bull in the Philippine Basketball League, teaming up with future teammates Jimwell Torion, Lordy Tugade, Junthy Valenzuela, and Fil-American recruit Davonn Harp, but never led the Energy Kings to a title in his only stint in 1999.

== PBA career ==
=== Red Bull Barako ===
Raymundo joined the PBA at the age of 19 when Red Bull made the decision to move to the PBA from the PBL making him the second youngest player to join the league. He played six games for Red Bull in his debut in the 2000 All-Filipino Cup, but was banned by the league for the rest of the season after finding out that Raymundo falsified his requirements to enter the league. The league required players who have graduated from high school in 1996, while Raymundo graduated only a year later before going to Letran.

He would later return in 2001 for the Thunder, becoming one of the vital cogs, along with Davonn Harp, Mick Pennisi, Jimwell Torion, former collegiate teammate Miller and import Antonio Lang, to lead Red Bull to their first championship over the San Miguel Beermen in the Commissioner's Cup.

=== Purefoods Tender Juicy Hotdogs ===
In 2002, Raymundo was shipped to Purefoods. In his first year with the franchise, he led the team to a Governor's Cup championship. Raymundo also received the Finals MVP award under then-interim coach Ryan Gregorio.

He was again instrumental in Purefoods' 2006 PBA Philippine Cup crown, along with James Yap, Peter June Simon and Marc Pingris.

After Rey Evangelista retired in 2008, Raymundo assumed the role of team captain.

He was sidelined with a knee injury when Purefoods took home the 2009–10 PBA Philippine Cup trophy.

On March 28, 2011, Raymundo became the 63rd player to join the PBA's 5,000-point club.

On April 2, 2011, Raymundo became the 33rd player in PBA history to collect at least 2,000 defensive rebounds.

On December 3, 2011, Raymundo became the 41st player in PBA history to collect at least 1,000 offensive rebounds.

=== Barangay Ginebra San Miguel ===
Before the start of the 2012 Commissioner's Cup, B-MEG traded former team-captain and stalwart Raymundo to its sister team Ginebra and in turn acquired high flying forward JC Intal.

=== Meralco Bolts ===
After Meralco got eliminated in the Governor's Cup Semifinals series against San Mig Coffee Mixers, the Bolts traded big man Jay-R Reyes for him. This trade reunites him with Ryan Gregorio, his former coach in Purefoods. The veteran Raymundo, who chose not to sign a contract with Meralco for the moment, has yet to play a single game for the Bolts. He has been sidelined by a complicated knee injury since the start of the 2013 Governors' Cup while he was still playing for the Gin Kings - an injury which would cost Raymundo around P4.5 million of his own money if he opts to undergo surgery in the US.

Originally diagnosed as a mere bone bruise, the injury turned out to be a lot more serious when Raymundo had his knee checked in the United States last November 2013. The injury is the same one that sidelined New York Knicks power forward Amar'e Stoudemire for a long period.

In May 2015, Raymundo announced his retirement, saying that although he is still capable of playing after he was cleared by his doctors to play, he no longer had the passion to continue playing basketball.

== PBA career statistics ==
Legend
GP	Games played	MPG	Minutes per game
FG%	Field-goal percentage	3P%	3-point field-goal percentage	FT%	Free-throw percentage
RPG	Rebounds per game	APG	Assists per game	SPG	Steals per game
BPG	Blocks per game	PPG	Points per game	**Bold**	Career high

=== Season-by-season averages ===
Year	Team	GP	MPG	FG%	3P%	FT%	RPG	APG	SPG	BPG	PPG
2001	Red Bull	50	24.4	.391	.000	.656	5.1	.9	.2	.6	6.9
2002	Purefoods	43	22.7	**.468**	.200	.636	5.1	1.3	.3	.4	8.2
2003	Purefoods	36	35.6	.419	.314	.680	8.4	2.9	.6	**1.1**	13.9
2004–05	Purefoods	**61**	32.2	.444	.214	.626	8.1	1.9	.7	.7	12.9
2005–06	Purefoods	55	36.6	.427	.226	.690	**9.5**	3.0	.5	**1.1**	15.0
2006–07	Purefoods	23	**39.4**	.400	.250	.716	9.4	3.8	.9	.9	15.5
2007–08	Purefoods	50	36.7	.327	.261	**.750**	9.2	**4.3**	.7	.4	15.3
2008–09	Purefoods	36	36.5	.329	.291	.709	7.6	2.8	.5	.5	**16.6**
2009–10	Purefoods / B-Meg Derby Ace	32	32.0	.412	**.343**	.675	5.9	2.8	.3	.4	13.5
2010–11	B-Meg Derby Ace	5	29.8	.347	.000	.560	8.6	2.0	**1.0**	.0	13.2
2011–12	B-Meg	45	25.3	.429	.077	.642	5.9	1.7	.5	.4	9.9
2011–12	Barangay Ginebra	45	25.3	.429	.077	.642	5.9	1.7	.5	.4	9.9
2012–13	Barangay Ginebra	38	16.6	.423	.000	.638	4.6	1.0	.3	.4	7.7
Career		474	30.5	.401	.266	.677	7.2	2.3	.5	.6	12.2

== National team career ==
He is a many-time member of the Philippine national basketball team, and was considered as a possible team captain in 2009.
