= KG Canaleta =

Filipino basketball player

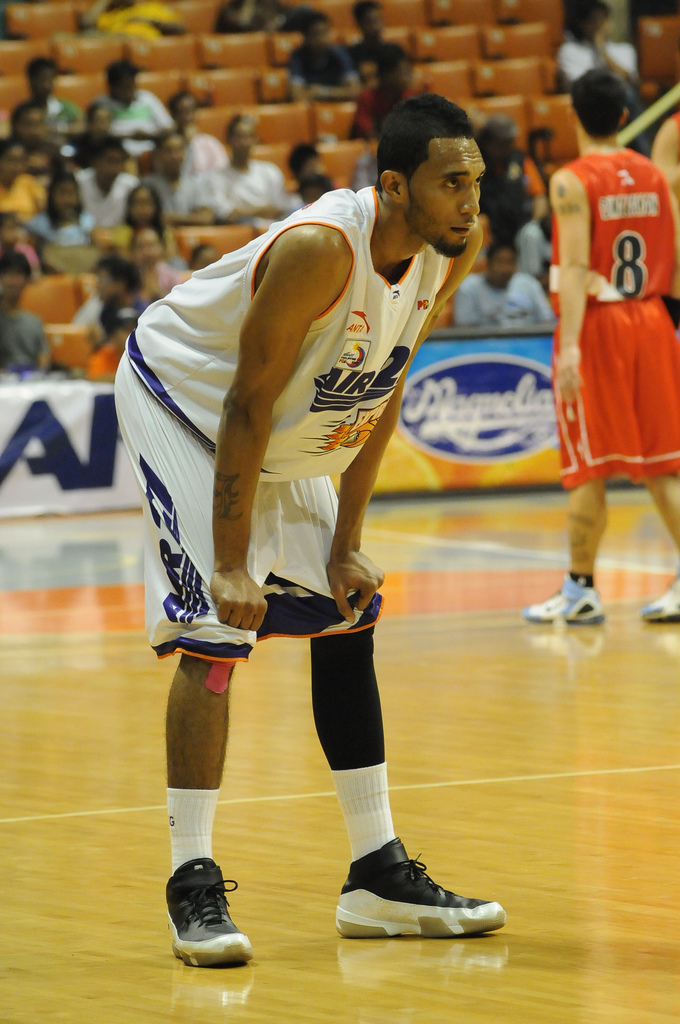
- Canaleta with the Air21 Express in 2008

Biñan Tatak Gel
- Title: Assistant coach
- League: MPBL

Personal information
- Born: February 12, 1982 (age 44) Tarlac City, Tarlac, Philippines
- Listed height: 6 ft 6 in (1.98 m)
- Listed weight: 194 lb (88 kg)

Career information
- College: UE (2002–2004)
- PBA draft: 2005: 1st round, 6th overall pick
- Drafted by: Air21 Express
- Playing career: 2005–2025
- Position: Power forward / small forward
- Number: 9, 12
- Coaching career: 2022–present

Career history

Playing
- 2005–2009: Air21 Express
- 2009–2011: B-Meg Derby Ace Llamados / B-Meg Llamados
- 2011: Air21 Express
- 2011–2012: Barangay Ginebra Kings
- 2012–2014: Air21 Express
- 2014: Talk 'N Text Tropang Texters
- 2014–2015: NLEX Road Warriors
- 2015–2016: Mahindra Enforcer
- 2016–2017: GlobalPort Batang Pier
- 2017: Blackwater Elite
- 2017–2019: Meralco Bolts
- 2019–2021: Blackwater Elite/Bossing
- 2022: Taichung Wagor Suns
- 2022: Boracay Islanders
- 2022–2023: Taichung Suns
- 2023: Imus SV Squad
- 2023–2025: Biñan Tatak Gel

Coaching
- 2022–2023: Taichung Suns (assistant)
- 2024–present: Biñan Tatak Gel (assistant)
- 2025–present: UE Red Warriors (assistant)

Career highlights
- As player: PBA champion (2009–10 Philippine); 2× PBA All-Star (2013–2014); PBA Most Improved Player (2013); PBA Mr. Quality Minutes (2010); PBA All-Rookie Team (2006); 5× PBA Slam Dunk champion (2005–2007, 2010, 2012)

Rommel Niño T. "KG" Canaleta (born February 12, 1982) is a Filipino professional basketball player who last played and served as an assistant coach for the Biñan Tatak Gel of the Maharlika Pilipinas Basketball League (MPBL). He is also a former assistant coach for the Taichung Suns of the T1 League.

In college, Canaleta played for the UE Red Warriors.

He played majority of his career in the Philippine Basketball Association (PBA). A 6-6 athletic forward, he is fondly called by nicknames like KG, The Big Ticket, and The Da Vinci of Dunk. He won the 2005, 2006, 2007, 2010 and 2012 PBA Slam Dunk Contests to become the first five-time PBA slam dunk champion and also played for the Air21 Express, B-Meg Llamados, Barangay Ginebra Kings, Talk 'N Text Tropang Texters, NLEX Road Warriors, Mahindra Enforcer, Blackwater Elite, and the Meralco Bolts. Towards the end of his career, he played in Taiwan and also had stints in the MPBL.

== College career ==
Canaleta first played for the UE Red Warriors in UAAP Season 65. In his rookie season, they lost to the Ateneo Blue Eagles in the Final Four. As a senior, he scored a college career-high 25 points in a win over the De La Salle Green Archers. He led them to another Final Four appearance that year.

== Professional career ==
=== PBA ===
==== Air21 Express (2005–2009) ====
Canaleta was selected sixth overall in the 2005 PBA draft by the Air21 Express alongside first overall pick Jay Washington and Mark Cardona. He signed with Air21 for three years and ₱7.2 million. He had his first double-digit scoring game in a win over the Sta. Lucia Realtors. During the 2005 All-Star Weekend, he won his first Slam Dunk contest by dunking one-handed from near the free-throw line, beating Enrico Villanueva. He was a contributor to Air21's third-place finish in the 2005–06 Fiesta Conference, which was also Air21's first semifinals appearance in franchise history.

Canaleta then defended his Slam Dunk title during the 2006 All-Star Weekend by defeating Cyrus Baguio. He was also selected to play in the Rookies vs Sophomores game. Midway through the 2006 PBA Philippine Cup, with Air21 in eighth in the nine-team field, their leading scorer Renren Ritualo was traded. After scoring 11 points on poor efficiency in Air21's first game after the trade, Canaleta stepped up, scored 27 points in a win over the Alaska Aces. From there he made a serious run for the Rookie of the Year honors with an impressive campaign where he averaged 16.2 points per game, No. 1 among rookies and seventh in the tournament among locals. He also scored 32 points (his career-high at the time) in a win over the San Miguel Beermen. For the season, he was ranked second in scoring among rookies during his rookie year with 9.4 points per outing. But the two finals stints of Red Bull clinched the award for Larry Fonacier. Canaleta and Fonacier made the All-Rookie team together.

During the 2006–07 Philippine Cup, Canaleta injured his nose after a freak collision with teammate Ronald Tubid in a game against the Barangay Ginebra Kings. As a result, he was not allowed to do physical activities for two weeks. That season, he won his third straight Slam Dunk contest, beating Jay Washington. During the 2007 Fiesta Conference, Air21 became fan favorites for their close finishes in games. He was able to lead them to the quarterfinals, where they lost to the Talk 'N Text Tropang Texters in three games.

In Air21's first game of the 2007–08 Philippine Cup, Canaleta scored a season-high 32 points in a loss to the Magnolia Beverage Masters. That year, Canaleta was set to compete in the Three-Point contest as well as go for a fourth straight Slam Dunk title during the. However, he hurt his right patella as he was preparing for the contests. During the 2008 Fiesta Conference, he scored 29 points in a win over the Coca-Cola Tigers. They made the finals in that conference, losing to Ginebra in seven games.

==== B-Meg Llamados (2009–2011) ====
On January 27, 2009, Canaleta and Don Allado were traded to the B-Meg Llamados in a three-team trade. He competed in the Slam Dunk Contest during the 2009 All-Star Week, but lost in the first round as import David Noel won the contest.

He was also awarded by the PBA as with the Mr. Quality Minutes award in 2010.

During the 2010 PBA All-Star Weekend, he dunked on three men in the final round against Kelly Williams to win his fourth PBA Slam Dunk Contest.

==== Barangay Ginebra Kings (2011–2012) ====
On July 18, 2011, Canaleta and a 2012 draft pick were traded from Air21 to Barangay Ginebra for Willie Miller.

In 2012, Canaleta did it again after dunking on three men, including 6-foot-9 Asi Taulava, to win his 5th Slam Dunk Contest. He also played in the Stalwarts vs. Greats game during that weekend.

==== 3rd stint with Air21 (2012–2014) ====
On December 5, 2012, during the 2012–13 Philippine Cup, Canaleta scored a career-high 41 points in their 112–93 win against GlobalPort Batang Pier. Canaleta was named the PBA Press Corps' Player of the Week for the period April 8–14, 2013 after dropping 37 points anchored on 9-18 shooting from 3-point land in their come-from-behind win over Petron, 95–91. For the conference, he averaged a personal-best 17.1 points, 5.5 rebounds and 1.5 assists and led them to a quarterfinals appearance.

==== Talk 'N Text Tropang Texters (2014) ====
On January 20, 2014, Canaleta was traded by Air21 to Talk 'N Text Tropang Texters for Sean Anthony, Eliud Poligrates, and a 2016 first-round pick. For the 2014 All-Star Weekend, he was selected as an All-Star reserve.

==== NLEX Road Warriors (2014–2015) ====
On October 9, 2014, Canaleta was traded from Talk 'N Text to the NLEX Road Warriors in a three-team trade that involved Blackwater Elite.

==== Mahindra Enforcer (2015–2016) ====
On August 25, 2015, Canaleta was traded by NLEX to Mahindra Enforcer in a three-team trade that also involved Talk 'N Text.

==== Blackwater Elite (2017) ====
On March 29, Canaleta was traded to the Blackwater Elite in exchange for Dylan Ababou and James Forrester.

==== Meralco Bolts (2017–2019) ====
After Canaleta and Blackwater could not agree on a new contract, he became a free agent. He considered starting a career overseas and joining a team in Taiwan. In his first game with Meralco, he led the team with 25 points in a win over his former team Blackwater.

On January 10, 2018, while playing for the Meralco Bolts, Canaleta became the 87th member of the elite 5,000 points club, 83rd among locals, in the Bolts 103–98 loss to the Alaska Aces.

==== Return to Blackwater (2019–2021) ====
On October 25, 2019, Canaleta, along with Mike Tolomia and two second-round draft picks in 2020 and 2022, was traded to the Blackwater Elite for Allein Maliksi and Raymar Jose. This was his second stint with the Elite. On January 21, 2022, Blackwater released him.

=== Taiwan ===
On March 19, 2022, Canaleta signed with Taichung Wagor Suns of the T1 League. On December 20, Canaleta signed with Taichung as assistant coach. On December 23, Taichung Suns registered Canaleta as import player. On February 10, 2023, Taichung Suns cancelled the registration of Canaleta's playership.

== National team career ==
In 2003, Canaleta was on the Philippines men's national team pool.

In 2005, Canaleta was on the Philippines men's national team that was set to compete in the 2005 SEA Games. However, due to a leadership crisis in the governing body for basketball, basketball was scrapped from the event. He would get to compete in the Jones Cup the following year.

In 2012, Canaleta joined Chot Reyes's Gilas 2.0 training pool, joining them for the Dubai International Basketball Tournament. In a game against Al Sagesse in that tournament, he had 32 points on eight three-pointers.

Philippines in the FIBA World 3x3 finals.

== Coaching career ==
Canaleta first got into coaching as an assistant coach for Taichung in the T1 League under Chris Gavina, his coach at Mahindra. In 2025, he joined the coaching staff of the UE Red Warriors under Gavina as an assistant coach.

== Personal life ==
As a child, Canaleta looked up to Michael Jordan and Kevin Garnett. It was during his first year in college that he became associated with the nickname "KG" after he shaved his head, drawing comparisons to Garnett's looks, while others noted his resemblance to Kobe Bryant. He has also gotten a tattoo of KG's initials on his arms.

Canaleta is a member of the PBA Moto Club, a group of former PBA players that vlog their motorcycles rides together and play in exhibition games that includes Rico Maierhofer, Jayjay Helterbrand, Marc Pingris and many more.

== PBA career statistics ==
Legend
GP	Games played	MPG	Minutes per game
FG%	Field-goal percentage	3P%	3-point field-goal percentage	FT%	Free-throw percentage
RPG	Rebounds per game	APG	Assists per game	SPG	Steals per game
BPG	Blocks per game	PPG	Points per game	**Bold**	Career high

As of the end of 2021 season

=== Season-by-season averages ===
Year	Team	GP	MPG	FG%	3P%	FT%	RPG	APG	SPG	BPG	PPG
2005–06	Air21	52	21.0	.388	.304	.707	3.8	.6	.3	.3	9.4
2006–07	Air21	41	25.8	.395	.331	.703	**5.8**	.8	.4	**.7**	11.9
2007–08	Air21	50	23.5	.397	.332	.681	3.2	1.2	**.5**	.6	10.4
2008–09	Air21	37	18.1	.353	.220	.736	3.9	.8	.3	.3	5.8
2008–09	Purefoods	37	18.1	.353	.220	.736	3.9	.8	.3	.3	5.8
2009–10	Purefoods / B-Meg Derby Ace	**58**	17.5	.379	.345	.596	2.6	.9	.3	.4	8.1
2010–11	B-Meg Derby Ace	43	20.0	.374	.342	.804	3.7	.5	.4	.5	8.0
2010–11	Air21	43	20.0	.374	.342	.804	3.7	.5	.4	.5	8.0
2011–12	Barangay Ginebra	36	17.2	.413	.364	.739	3.3	.7	.2	.3	8.7
2012–13	Air21	39	**30.6**	.397	.369	.739	5.3	**1.3**	**.5**	.6	**16.7**
2013–14	Air21	48	23.8	.388	.351	.769	4.1	.7	**.5**	.2	10.2
2013–14	Talk 'N Text	48	23.8	.388	.351	.769	4.1	.7	**.5**	.2	10.2
2014–15	NLEX	36	20.1	.382	.327	.762	3.3	.6	.2	.1	8.1
2015–16	Mahindra	32	25.3	.425	.354	**.841**	3.8	1.0	.2	.4	11.7
2016–17	GlobalPort	36	23.5	.372	.347	.745	4.1	.9	.4	.4	8.4
2016–17	Blackwater	36	23.5	.372	.347	.745	4.1	.9	.4	.4	8.4
2017–18	Meralco	37	19.4	.394	.374	.722	3.7	1.0	.2	.3	8.6
2019	Meralco	25	12.7	**.436**	**.429**	.833	2.0	.9	.2	.2	6.6
2019	Blackwater	25	12.7	**.436**	**.429**	.833	2.0	.9	.2	.2	6.6
2020	Blackwater	11	25.4	.398	.347	.765	4.3	.7	.2	.5	11.7
2021	Blackwater	13	16.0	.306	.190	.727	2.2	.6	.2	.6	4.6
Career		594	21.4	.390	.341	.723	3.7	.8	.3	.4	9.5

== Awards and milestones ==
- Mr. Quality Minutes Award (2010)
- Five-time PBA Slam Dunk Champion (2005, 2006, 2007, 2010, 2012)
- PBA All Rookie First Team (2005–2006)
- Scored a record 38 Points in the PBA Rookie Game
- 2013 PBA Most Improved Player
- 5,000 points scored
