= Rico Maierhofer =

Filipino basketball player (born 1985)

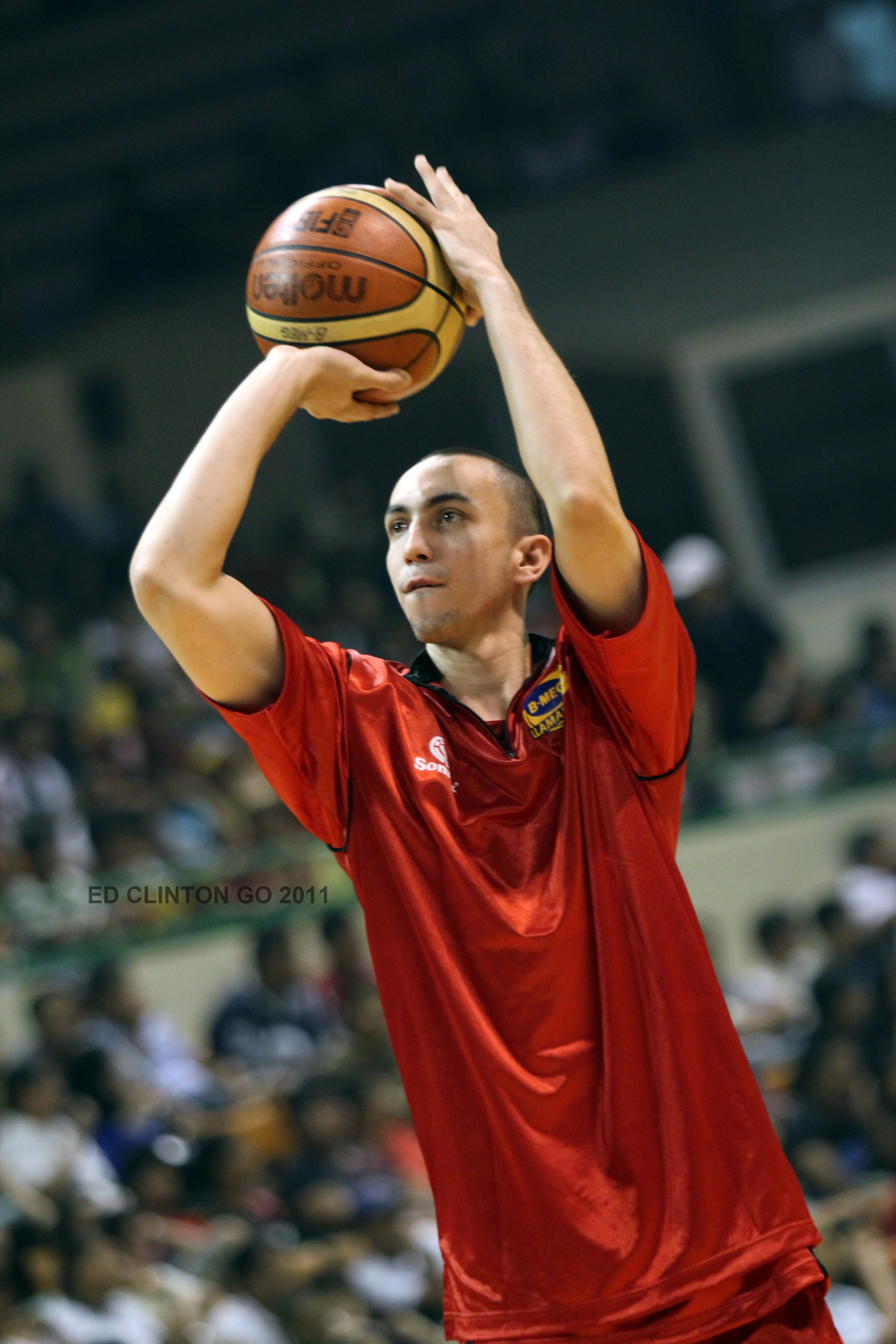
- Maierhofer in 2011

Personal information
- Born: November 4, 1985 (age 41) Pasay, Philippines
- Listed height: 6 ft 6 in (1.98 m)
- Listed weight: 175 lb (79 kg)

Career information
- High school: Puerto Galera Academy (Puerto Galera, Oriental Mindoro)
- College: De La Salle
- PBA draft: 2009: 1st round, 2nd overall pick
- Drafted by: Purefoods Tender Juicy Giants
- Playing career: 2009–2018
- Position: Power forward

Career history

Playing
- 2009–2011: Purefoods Tender Juicy Giants / B-Meg Derby Ace Llamados / B-Meg Llamados
- 2011–2013: Barangay Ginebra Kings
- 2013–2014: Barako Bull Energy Cola
- 2014–2015: San Miguel Beermen
- 2015: Barako Bull Energy
- 2015–2017: GlobalPort Batang Pier
- 2017–2018: San Miguel Alab Pilipinas

Coaching
- 2023: Imus SV Squad (assistant)

Career highlights
- 2× PBA champion (2009–10 Philippine, 2014–15 Philippine); 2× PBA All-Star (2010, 2012); PBA All-Rookie Team (2010); PBA Rookie of the Year (2010); ABL champion (2018); UAAP champion (2007); 2× UAAP Mythical First Team (2007, 2008); PBL Mythical First Team (2008)

Paul Rico Galenzoga Maierhofer (born November 4, 1985) is a Filipino former professional basketball player and former assistant coach for the Imus SV Squad of Maharlika Pilipinas Basketball League. He was drafted 2nd overall by the Purefoods Tender Juicy Giants in 2009.

== Professional career ==
=== Purefoods Tender Juicy Giants / B-Meg Llamados ===
As a rookie with the Giants, he made an immediate impact on the team as an athletic and rebounding combo forward. He was one of the key players that helped former teammate James Yap and the others beat the Alaska Aces in the finals of the 2009–10 PBA Philippine Cup. After winning the Rookie of the Year award in 2010, Maierhofer looked poised for a breakout year. With B-Meg Llamados' (Purefood's Tender Juicy Giant's new name) frontline depleted because of injuries to Marc Pingris, Kerby Raymundo, and Rafi Reavis, Maierhofer got a lot of playing time in 2010–11 PBA Philippine Cup, and he responded by averaging, for the tournament, 9.6 rebounds (5th in the league) and 1.2 blocks (4th) — leading the team in both categories.

But tragedy struck in the Commissioner's Cup on that same season, when he suffered a torn ACL injury. He has struggled in his return in the 2011-12 PBA season, averaging just 2.3 points and 3.4 rebounds in only 11 minutes per game. This prompted B-Meg to trade him.

=== Barangay Ginebra San Miguel ===
He was traded to Ginebra via a three-team trade which involved Yancy de Ocampo (along with a 2012 2nd-round draft pick) going to B-Meg, Allein Maliksi going to Ginebra, and Jimbo Aquino (along with 2013 1st-round pick) going to Barako Bull. Since joining Ginebra, he admittedly struggled to get playing time in a roster filled with big men like Kerby Raymundo, veterans Rudy Hatfield and Willy Wilson, and now the 6-foot-9 Japeth Aguilar. He's also been involved in several trade rumors. During the 2013 PBA Commissioner's Cup alone, he just logged in an average of 6.36 minutes, contributing 2 points and 2.14 rebounds – numbers that are way behind his season average of 22.43 minutes when he was still with B-Meg in 2010.

=== Barako Bull Energy Cola ===
Eventually, he was again traded to Barako Bull along with Wilson in a draft-day trade for the No. 4 pick which Barangay Ginebra used to pick James Forrester. While playing for Energy Cola, he was a part of the formidable veteran crew which gave Petron Blaze Boosters a run for their own money during their 2013–14 PBA Philippine Cup best-of-3 quarterfinal matchup, yet they were swept in that series.

=== San Miguel Beermen ===
On February 18, 2014, Maierhofer was traded to San Miguel via a complex four-team trade which also involved GlobalPort, Barako Bull, and Air21. The series of trades started with San Miguel, formerly Petron, acquiring Maierhofer from Barako Bull in exchange for Jason Deutchman and the Beermen's second-round picks in 2016 and 2017. San Miguel then added Sol Mercado to its pool of stars in a straight swap with GlobalPort for guard Alex Cabagnot. In the third step, Barako Bull acquired veteran wingman Leo Najorda from GlobalPort in exchange for guard Jonas Villanueva, who was traded by the Batang Pier to Air21 for Bonbon Custodio.

=== Return to Barako Bull ===
On April 6, 2015, Rico Maierhofer traded back to Barako Bull Energy for Billy Mamaril in a part of four team six players trade. On May 27, 2015, he became famous throughout the whole world after using his shoe to block a shot by Gabby Espinas against his former team, the San Miguel Beermen. Two days later, he was fined ₱20,000 for “using a foreign object as an aid in performing an offensive or defensive move.” Maierhofer then publicly apologized for his conduct, saying it was unprofessional and should have not been done.

=== GlobalPort Batang Pier ===
On October 13, 2015, Maierhofer was traded by the Barako Bull Energy to the GlobalPort Batang Pier in exchange for Jervy Cruz.

=== Alab Pilipinas (ABL) ===
On October 17, 2017, Maierhofer was signed by ASEAN Basketball League club Alab Pilipinas after being released by GlobalPort. The signing was confirmed on the club's social media accounts, along with the signing of Dondon Hontiveros.

== PBA career statistics ==
Legend
GP	Games played	MPG	Minutes per game
FG%	Field-goal percentage	3P%	3-point field-goal percentage	FT%	Free-throw percentage
RPG	Rebounds per game	APG	Assists per game	SPG	Steals per game
BPG	Blocks per game	PPG	Points per game	**Bold**	Career high

=== Season-by-season averages ===
Year	Team	GP	MPG	FG%	3P%	FT%	RPG	APG	SPG	BPG	PPG
2009–10	Purefoods / B-Meg Derby Ace	**62**	17.9	.516	.200	.684	4.9	.9	.3	.7	6.2
2010–11	B-Meg Derby Ace	23	**22.4**	.406	**.286**	.560	**9.0**	**1.3**	**.5**	**1.1**	**7.0**
2011–12	B-Meg	22	11.7	.531	.000	.484	3.8	.6	.3	.6	3.1
2011–12	Barangay Ginebra	22	11.7	.531	.000	.484	3.8	.6	.3	.6	3.1
2012–13	Barangay Ginebra	40	14.3	.526	.143	.500	5.2	.9	.3	.3	4.0
2013–14	Barako Bull	29	11.6	.494	.200	.614	3.4	.8	.1	.3	3.9
2013–14	San Miguel	29	11.6	.494	.200	.614	3.4	.8	.1	.3	3.9
2014–15	San Miguel	24	10.1	.525	.000	.600	3.0	.4	.2	.3	2.6
2014–15	Barako Bull	24	10.1	.525	.000	.600	3.0	.4	.2	.3	2.6
2015–16	GlobalPort	26	15.2	**.547**	.200	**.694**	6.2	1.2	.4	.7	3.7
2016–17	GlobalPort	27	8.4	.467	.000	.615	2.8	.3	.2	.2	1.6
Career		253	14.5	.499	.193	.608	4.8	.8	.3	.5	4.3

== Personal life ==
He was born to an Austrian father and a Filipina mother Elenita.

He is married to Jeck Maierhofer (née Conwi), and has two sons and two daughters.
