= 2003 Purefoods Tender Juicy Hotdogs season =

- Head coach: Ryan Gregorio
- General manager: Rene Pardo

All-Filipino Cup results
- Record: 5–13 (27.8%)
- Place: N/A
- Playoff finish: N/A

Mabuhay Cup results
- Record: 0–4 (0%)
- Place: N/A
- Playoff finish: N/A

Reinforced Conference results
- Record: 4–10 (28.6%)
- Place: N/A
- Playoff finish: N/A

Purefoods Tender Juicy Hotdogs seasons

The 2003 Purefoods Tender Juicy Hotdogs season was the 16th season of the franchise in the Philippine Basketball Association (PBA).

== Transactions ==
Players Added

Via Draft

- Billy Mamaril
- Jenkins Mesina

Via Free Agency

- Gilbert Demape (From Talk 'N Text Phone Pals)
- Egay Echavez
- Ronald Magtulis (From Barangay Ginebra Kings)
- Rodney Santos (From Alaska Aces)
Players Lost

Via Retirement

- Ronnie Magsanoc

Via Free Agency

- Bonel Balingit
- Jolly Escobar
- Roger Yap (To FedEx Express)

== Occurrences ==
Coach Eric Altamirano steps down and was replaced by Ryan Gregorio, who steered the hotdogs to a title last season.

Ronnie Magsanoc retires from active playing to concentrate on assisting the head coach on the Purefoods bench.

== Roster ==
2003 Purefoods Tender Juicy Hotdogs roster
Players

Pos.	#	POB	Name	Height	Weight	DOB (YYYY–MM–DD)	From
F	2	(Philippines)	Richard Yee	6 ft 4 in (1.93 m)			UST
F	4	(Philippines)	Billy Mamaril	6 ft 6 in (1.98 m)			Bakersfield
G	6	(Philippines)	Boyet Fernandez	5 ft 8 in (1.73 m)			San Agustin
F	7	(Philippines)	Rey Evangelista	6 ft 3 in (1.91 m)			UST
G	8	(Philippines)	Gilbert Demape	6 ft 1 in (1.85 m)			Cebu Tech
G		(Philippines)	Edgar Echavez	5 ft 10 in (1.78 m)			Misamis Institute
F	10	(Philippines)	Mark Victoria	6 ft 3 in (1.91 m)			Far Eastern
F	16	(Philippines)	Alvin Patrimonio	6 ft 3 in (1.91 m)			Mapúa
C	21	(Philippines)	Kerby Raymundo	6 ft 6 in (1.98 m)			Letran
G	26	(Philippines)	Rodney Santos	6 ft 1 in (1.85 m)			San Sebastian
C	33	(Philippines)	Chris Cantonjos	6 ft 6 in (1.98 m)			UST
G	40	(United States)	Noy Castillo	6 ft 0 in (1.83 m)			The Citadel
C	52	(United States)	Andy Seigle	6 ft 9 in (2.06 m)			New Orleans
F	55	(Philippines)	Jenkins Mesina	6 ft 3 in (1.91 m)			San Beda
F		(Philippines)	Ronald Magtulis	6 ft 3 in (1.91 m)			Far Eastern
F	1	(United States)	Harold Arceneaux (I)	6 ft 3 in (1.91 m)			Weber State
G/F	32	(United States)	Lenny Cooke (I)	6 ft 4 in (1.93 m)			Northern Valley HS (NJ)

Coaches
Head coach
- (Philippines) Ryan Gregorio
Assistant(s)
- (Philippines) Ronnie Magsanoc

Legend
- (DP) Unsigned draft pick
- (FA) Free agent
- (S) Suspended
- (I) Import
- Injured

== Game results ==
=== All-Filipino Cup ===
Date	Opponent	Score	Top scorer	Venue	Location
February 26	Brgy.Ginebra	76–84		Philsports Arena	Pasig
March 2	Shell	78–69		Araneta Coliseum	Quezon City
March 8	Coca-Cola	88–93 2OT			Iloilo City
March 12	FedEx	86–90		Philsports Arena	Pasig
March 16	Red Bull	90–98		Araneta Coliseum	Quezon City
March 23	Sta.Lucia	59–68		Araneta Coliseum	Quezon City
March 28	San Miguel	88–85	Patrimonio (18 pts)	Araneta Coliseum	Quezon City
April 2	Talk 'N Text	85–83		Philsports Arena	Pasig
April 5	Brgy.Ginebra	73–69			Lucena City
April 11	Shell	65–68		Makati Coliseum	Makati City
April 13	Alaska			Philsports Arena	Pasig
April 23	San Miguel	82–72		Philsports Arena	Pasig
April 27	Sta.Lucia	71–75		Araneta Coliseum	Quezon City
May 2	Red Bull	86–105		Philsports Arena	Pasig
May 9	Coca-Cola	87–97	Raymundo & Seigle (21 pts)	Philsports Arena	Pasig
May 14	FedEx	76–77	Seigle (21 pts)	Philsports Arena	Pasig
May 21	Talk 'N Text			Philsports Arena	Pasig
May 25	Alaska	85–90	Seigle (20 pts)	Araneta Coliseum	Quezon City

Win
Win via OT
loss
loss via OT
