= 2005–06 Purefoods Chunkee Giants season =

- Head coach: Ryan Gregorio
- General Manager: Alvin Patrimonio
- Owner(s): San Miguel Purefoods, Inc.

Fiesta Conference results
- Record: 16–12 (57.1%)
- Place: 2nd
- Playoff finish: Runner-up

Philippine Cup results
- Record: 20–9 (69%)
- Place: 1st
- Playoff finish: Champions

Purefoods Chunkee Giants seasons

The 2005–06 Purefoods Chunkee Giants season was the 18th season of the franchise in the Philippine Basketball Association (PBA).

== Key dates ==
- August 14: The 2005 PBA Draft took place in Sta. Lucia East Grand Mall, Cainta, Rizal.

== Occurrences ==
Starting at the opening of the season, Alvin Patrimonio serves as manager, replacing Ed Cordero.

== Draft picks ==
Round	Pick	Player	Height	Position	Nationality	College
1	4	Jondan Salvador	6'4"	Forward - Center	Philippines	St. Benilde
2	13	BJ Manalo	6'0"	Guard	Philippines	De La Salle

== Roster ==
2005–06 Purefoods Chunkee Giants roster
Players

Pos.	#	POB	Name	Height	Weight	DOB (YYYY–MM–DD)	From
G	3	(Philippines)	Egay Billones	5 ft 9 in (1.75 m)	165 lb (75 kg)	1975-11-03	Centro Escolar Las Piñas
G	4	(Philippines)	Paul Artadi	5 ft 9 in (1.75 m)	150 lb (68 kg)	1981-05-05	UE
F/C	5	(Philippines)	Jondan Salvador	6 ft 4 in (1.93 m)	210 lb (95 kg)	1980-10-12	St. Benilde
F	7	(Philippines)	Rey Evangelista	6 ft 3 in (1.91 m)	190 lb (86 kg)	1971-12-28	UST
G	8	(Philippines)	Peter June Simon	6 ft 1 in (1.85 m)	180 lb (82 kg)	1980-06-01	Mindanao
F/C	9	(Philippines)	Jun Limpot	6 ft 5 in (1.96 m)		1971-12-14	De La Salle
G	13	(Philippines)	Roger Yap	6 ft 1 in (1.85 m)	170 lb (77 kg)	1977-08-03	USJ–R
F	15	(Philippines)	Marc Pingris	6 ft 4 in (1.93 m)	215 lb (98 kg)	1981-10-16	PSBA
G/F	18	(Philippines)	James Yap	6 ft 3 in (1.91 m)	192 lb (87 kg)	1982-02-15	UE
F	20	(Philippines)	Don Camaso	6 ft 6 in (1.98 m)	200 lb (91 kg)	1973-03-16	Metro Manila Colleges
C	21	(Philippines)	Kerby Raymundo	6 ft 6 in (1.98 m)	215 lb (98 kg)	1981-01-19	Letran
F/C	28	(Philippines)	Richard Yee	6 ft 4 in (1.93 m)	205 lb (93 kg)	1977-06-2 9	UST
F	33	(United States)	Eugene Tejada	6 ft 5 in (1.96 m)		1980-09-24	Chabot
F/C	34	(Philippines)	Arnold Gamboa	6 ft 6 in (1.98 m)		1973-05-01	Far Eastern
F	35	(United States)	Marquin Chandler (I)	6 ft 8 in (2.03 m)	202 lb (92 kg)	1982-03-12	San José State
G	40	(United States)	Noy Castillo	6 ft 0 in (1.83 m)	180 lb (82 kg)	1974-08-21	The Citadel

Coaches

Head coach

- (Philippines) Ryan Gregorio

Assistant coach(es)

- (Philippines) Ronnie Magsanoc
- (Philippines) Dayong Mendoza

Legend

- (C) Team captain
- (I) Import
- Injured

== Fiesta Conference ==
=== Game log ===
2006 PBA Fiesta Conference game log
October

Game	Date	Opponent	Score	High points	High rebounds	High assists	Location Attendance	Record
1	October 2	Red Bull	84-77	Chandler (28)			Araneta Coliseum	1–0
2	October 7	Air21	86–88	Chandler (23)			Ynares Center	1–1
3	October 14	Alaska	86-84 OT	Chandler (31)			Cuneta Astrodome	2–1
4	October 16	San Miguel	92-90 OT	Chandler (26)			Araneta Coliseum	3–1
5	October 22	Brgy.Ginebra	84-78				Cagayan de Oro	4–1
6	October 26	Coca Cola	103-87	Chandler (27)			Araneta Coliseum	5–1
7	October 30	Talk 'N Text	82–96	J. Yap (22)			Araneta Coliseum	5–2

November

Game	Date	Opponent	Score	High points	High rebounds	High assists	Location Attendance	Record
8	November 4	Sta.Lucia					Ynares Center	6–2
9	November 9	Coca Cola					Araneta Coliseum	7–2
10	November 13	Red Bull	97-95	J. Yap (23)			Araneta Coliseum	8–2
11	November 16	Brgy.Ginebra					Araneta Coliseum	8–3
12	November 19	Alaska	78-69				Lucena City	9–3

December

Game	Date	Opponent	Score	High points	High rebounds	High assists	Location Attendance	Record
13	December 7	Talk 'N Text	89–93 OT				Ynares Center	9–4
14	December 11	San Miguel	68–74	Chandler (25)			Ynares Center	9–5
15	December 14	Sta.Lucia	84-75	J. Yap (27)			Cuneta Astrodome	10–5
16	December 18	Air21	109–110	Chandler (24)			Ynares Center	10–6

2005–06 schedule

== Transactions ==
=== Pre-season ===
Players Added

Via Draft

- Jondan Salvador

Via Trade

- Egay Billones (From FedEx)
- Marc Pingris (From FedEx)
- Roger Yap (From FedEx)
Players Lost

Via Free Agency

- Gilbert Demape (To Sta. Lucia Realtors)
- Tonyboy Espinosa (To Coca Cola Tigers)
- Mike Hrabak

=== Additions ===
Player	Signed	Former team
Don Camaso	March 2006	Talk 'N Text Phone Pals
Arnold Gamboa	March 2006	San Miguel Beermen
Eugene Tejada	March 2006	San Miguel Beermen

=== Subtractions ===
Player	Signed	New team
Eddie Laure	March 2006	Alaska Aces
