= 2010–11 B-Meg Derby Ace Llamados season =

- Head coach: Jorge Gallent
- Owners: San Miguel-Pure Foods Co., Inc.

Philippine Cup results
- Record: 7–7 (50%)
- Place: 4th
- Playoff finish: Semifinalist

Commissioner's Cup results
- Record: 4–5 (44.4%)
- Place: 7th
- Playoff finish: Did not qualify

Governors Cup results
- Record: 5–8 (38.5%)
- Place: 6th
- Playoff finish: Semifinalist

B-Meg Derby Ace Llamados seasons

The 2010–11 B-Meg Derby Ace Llamados season was the 23rd season of the franchise in the Philippine Basketball Association (PBA).

== Key dates ==
- August 29: The 2010 PBA Draft took place in Fort Bonifacio, Taguig.

== Draft picks ==
Round	Pick	Player	Height	Position	Nationality	College
1	9	Pari Llagas		Forward	Philippines	UE
2	13	Val Acuña	6 ft. 3 in.	Small forward	Philippines	UE

== Roster ==
2010–11 B-Meg Derby Ace Llamados roster
Players

Pos.	#	POB	Name	Height	Weight	DOB (YYYY–MM–DD)	From
G	0	(Philippines)	Jonas Villanueva (injured)	5 ft 11 in (1.80 m)	175 lb (79 kg)		Far Eastern
F	1	(Philippines)	Rico Maierhofer (injured)	6 ft 5 in (1.96 m)	180 lb (82 kg)		De La Salle
PG	2	(United States)	Urbiztondo, Joshua	5 ft 10 in (1.78 m)	185 lb (84 kg)		Fresno Pacific
C	4	(United States)	Rafi Reavis	6 ft 8 in (2.03 m)	210 lb (95 kg)		Coppin State
G	8	(Philippines)	Peter June Simon	6 ft 0 in (1.83 m)	180 lb (82 kg)		Mindanao
F/C	10	(Philippines)	Rommel Adducul	6 ft 6 in (1.98 m)	225 lb (102 kg)		San Sebastian
PG	11	(Philippines)	Pong Escobal	5 ft 11 in (1.80 m)	180 lb (82 kg)		San Beda
G/F	12	(Philippines)	Jonathan Fernandez	6 ft 3 in (1.91 m)	205 lb (93 kg)		National-U
G	13	(Philippines)	Roger Yap	6 ft 0 in (1.83 m)	170 lb (77 kg)		USJ–R
F/C	15	(Philippines)	Marc Pingris	6 ft 4 in (1.93 m)	215 lb (98 kg)		PSBA
G/F	18	(Philippines)	James Yap	6 ft 3 in (1.91 m)	205 lb (93 kg)		UE
PF	19	(Philippines)	Jerwin Gaco	6 ft 4 in (1.93 m)	205 lb (93 kg)		De La Salle
F/C	35	(Philippines)	Kerby Raymundo (injured) (C)	6 ft 6 in (1.98 m)	215 lb (98 kg)		Letran
F	38	(United States)	Joe Devance	6 ft 7 in (2.01 m)	220 lb (100 kg)		UTEP
F/C	80	(Philippines)	Don Allado	6 ft 5 in (1.96 m)	220 lb (100 kg)		De La Salle

Coaches

Head coach

- (Philippines) Jorge Gallent (Far Eastern)

Assistant coach(es)

- (Philippines) Richard del Rosario (De La Salle)
- (Philippines) Koy Banal (Mapúa)
- (Philippines) Arturo dela Cruz (San Sebastian)
- (Philippines) Dayong Mendoza (UP Diliman)

Legend

- (C) Team captain
- Injured

== Philippine Cup ==
=== Eliminations ===
==== Standings ====
Pos	Team	W	L	PCT	GB	Qualification
1	Talk 'N Text Tropang Texters	11	3	.786 (Note: Head-to-head record: San Miguel 1–1 Talk 'N Text (San Miguel +9))	—	Twice-to-beat in the quarterfinals
2	San Miguel Beermen	11	3	.786	—	Twice-to-beat in the quarterfinals
3	Barangay Ginebra Kings	10	4	.714	1	Best-of-three quarterfinals
4	B-Meg Derby Ace Llamados	7	7	.500 (Note: Head-to-head differential: B-Meg +23, Meralco −11, Alaska −12)	4	Best-of-three quarterfinals
5	Meralco Bolts	7	7	.500	4	Best-of-three quarterfinals
6	Alaska Aces	7	7	.500	4	Best-of-three quarterfinals
7	Air21 Express	6	8	.429	5	Twice-to-win in the quarterfinals
8	Rain or Shine Elasto Painters	5	9	.357	6	Twice-to-win in the quarterfinals
9	Powerade Tigers	3	11	.214 (Note: Head-to-head record: Barako Bull 1–0 Powerade)	8	
10	Barako Bull Energy Boosters	3	11	.214	8	

Source: PBA.ph

== Commissioner's Cup ==
=== Eliminations ===
==== Standings ====
Pos	Team	W	L	PCT	GB	Qualification
1	Talk 'N Text Tropang Texters	8	1	.889	—	Advance to semifinals
2	Smart Gilas (G)	7	2	.778	1	Advance to semifinals
3	Barangay Ginebra Kings	5	4	.556 (Note: Head-to-head differential: Barangay Ginebra +12, Air21 −4, Alaska −8)	3	Advance to quarterfinals
4	Air21 Express	5	4	.556	3	Advance to quarterfinals
5	Alaska Aces	5	4	.556	3	Advance to quarterfinals
6	Rain or Shine Elasto Painters	4	5	.444 (Note: Head-to-head record: Rain or Shine 1–0 B-Meg)	4	Advance to quarterfinals
7	B-Meg Derby Ace Llamados	4	5	.444	4	
8	Meralco Bolts	3	6	.333	5	
9	Powerade Tigers	2	7	.222 (Note: Head-to-head record: Powerade 1–0 San Miguel)	6	
10	San Miguel Beermen	2	7	.222	6	

Source: PBA.ph
(G) Guests

== Governors Cup ==
=== Eliminations ===
==== Standings ====
Pos	Team	W	L	PCT	GB	Qualification
1	Talk 'N Text Tropang Texters	6	2	.750	—	Semifinal round
2	Petron Blaze Boosters	5	3	.625 (Note: Head-to-head differential: Petron +10, Alaska +5, Barangay Ginebra −15)	1	Semifinal round
3	Alaska Aces	5	3	.625	1	Semifinal round
4	Barangay Ginebra Kings	5	3	.625	1	Semifinal round
5	Rain or Shine Elasto Painters	4	4	.500 (Note: Head-to-head differential: Rain or Shine +11, B-Meg 0, Powerade −11)	2	Semifinal round
6	B-Meg Derby Ace Llamados	4	4	.500	2	Semifinal round
7	Powerade Tigers	4	4	.500	2	
8	Meralco Bolts	3	5	.375	3	
9	Air21 Express	0	8	.000	6	

Source: PBA.ph

=== Semifinals ===
==== Standings ====
Overall standings
Pos	Team	W	L	PCT	GB	Qualification
1	Talk 'N Text Tropang Texters	9	4	.692	—	Finals
2	Petron Blaze Boosters	8	5	.615 (Note: Head-to-head differential: Petron +13, Alaska +6, Barangay Ginebra −19)	1	Finals
3	Alaska Aces	8	5	.615	1	
4	Barangay Ginebra Kings	8	5	.615	1	
5	Rain or Shine Elasto Painters	6	7	.462	3	
6	B-Meg Derby Ace Llamados	5	8	.385	4	

Source: PBA.ph
Notes:

Semifinal round standings
Pos	Team	W	L
1	Petron Blaze Boosters	3 (Note: Head-to-head differential: Petron +30, Talk 'N Text +15, Barangay Ginebra −16, Alaska −29)	2
2	Talk 'N Text Tropang Texters	3	2
3	Barangay Ginebra Kings	3	2
4	Alaska Aces	3	2
5	Rain or Shine Elasto Painters	2	3
6	B-Meg Derby Ace Llamados	1	4

Source: PBA.ph

== Transactions ==
=== Pre-season ===
==== Trades ====
September 3, 2010	To B-Meg Derby Ace Jonas Villanueva (from San Miguel); 2013 2nd round pick(from Air21)	To Air21 2014 1st round pick (from B-Meg Derby Ace)	To San Miguel Paul Artadi (from B-Meg Derby Ace)

=== Commissioner's Cup ===
==== Conditional dispersal draft ====
Player	Signed	Former team
Pong Escobal	February 9, 2011	Barako Bull*

=== Governors Cup ===
June 3, 2011	To B-Meg Derby Ace Joe Devance	To Air21 KG Canaleta; Jondan Salvador

=== Recruited imports ===
Team	Name	Debuted	Last game	Record
Commissioner's Cup	(United States) Rob Brown	February 23 (vs. Rain or Shine)	February 23 (vs. Rain or Shine)	0–1
Commissioner's Cup	(United States) Shamari Spears	February 26 (vs. Powerade)	March 23 (vs. Smart Gilas)	3-3
Commissioner's Cup	(United States) Courtney Beasley	March 27 (vs. San Miguel)	April 1 (vs. Talk 'N Text)	1-1
Governors Cup	(United States) Sthefhon Hannah	June 11 (vs. Rain or Shine)	June 26 (vs. Meralco)	2-2
Governors Cup	(United States) Darnell Hinson	June 30 (vs. Talk 'N Text)	July 15 (vs. Air21)	2-2
Governors Cup	(United States) Myron Allen	July 22 (vs. Rain or Shine)	August 3 (vs. Petron Blaze)	1–4
