= Ryan Gregorio =

Filipino basketball coach and executive

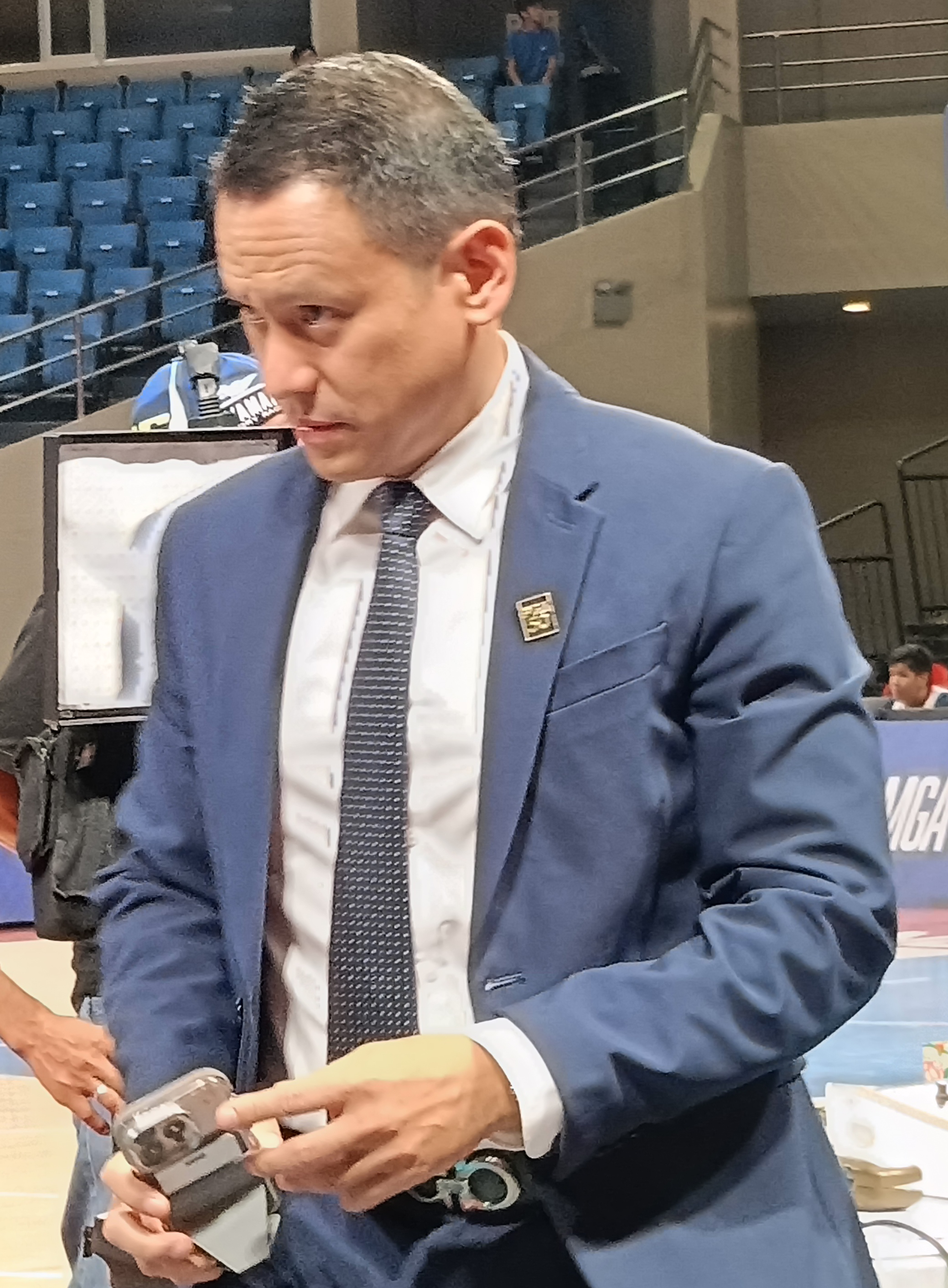
- Gregorio in 2025

Personal information
- Born: April 7, 1972 (age 54) Philippines

Career information
- College: UP
- Coaching career: 1997–present

Career history

Coaching
- 1997–1998: Purefoods Carne Norte Beefies (assistant)
- 1998–2000: Mobiline Phone Pals (assistant)
- 2000–2002: UP
- 2001: Purefoods Tender Juicy Hotdogs (assistant)
- 2002; 2003–2010: B-Meg Derby Ace Llamados
- 2010–2014: Meralco Bolts
- 2018–2019: Philippines (assistant)

Career highlights
- As coach: 3× PBA champion (2002 Governors', 2006 Philippine, 2009–10 Philippine); 3× PBA Coach of the Year (2002, 2005–06, 2009–10); 4× PBA All-Star Game Head Coach (2006, 2008, 2010, 2012); As assistant coach: PBA champion (1997 All-Filipino)

Paul Ryan C. Gregorio (born April 7, 1972) and nicknamed by some as "Coach R.G." is a Filipino professional basketball coach.

He was head coach of the Meralco Bolts in the Philippine Basketball Association from 2010 to 2014. Gregorio began his PBA coaching career with the Purefoods in 2002 on an acting capacity and won his first PBA Championship on the same year at the age of 29. He was also a former player (1992, 1993, 1994) and coach (2001) of the UP Fighting Maroons in the UAAP, before coaching in the pro league. He is a three-time PBA Champion Coach, a 4-time PBA All-Star Coach and a three-time PBA Coach of the Year awardee. He is one of the four PBA coaches who won at least 3 COY accolades. He is also the first and only coach in the league history to win a championship as an interim coach in 2002.

On August 24, 2018, he was appointed as the Special Assistant to the President of Samahang Basketbol ng Pilipinas.

== Education ==
Gregorio is a graduate of the University of the Philippines Diliman with the degree of Bachelor of Arts in Communication, Major in Film and Audio-Visual Communication (Batch 1994).

== Early career ==
Prior to his head coaching chores with Purefoods, Ryan Gregorio was an assistant coach and video coordinator of Eric Altamirano with Purefoods in 1997. When Altamirano moved up to the PBA to be the head coach of Mobiline, Gregorio also joined him with Frankie Lim as an assistant coach, until 2000 when they are sacked by the management.

He helped Mobiline to reach a finals stint in 1998 Governors' Cup, but lost in seven games against Formula Shell.

== Head coach ==
=== UP Fighting Maroons ===
Gregorio was hired as the head coach of the UP Fighting Maroons of the UAAP in 2000. His coaching tenure did not bear any Final Four appearances, and he was replaced by his brother Allan in 2002.

=== Purefoods ===
In 2002, Altamirano was selected to be as an assistant coach for the Philippine National Basketball Team, and Gregorio was named as the interim coach of the TJ Hotdogs. Under Gregorio's hands, Purefoods won the 2002 Governor's Cup with a 4–3 series victory over the Alaska Aces. The team was led by imports Derrick Brown, Kelvin Price and Best Player of the Conference winner Rey Evangelista. Gregorio coached the team to a dismal performance in the Commissioner's Cup before Altamirano regained coaching duties in the All-Filipino Cup. Despite this, Gregorio was rewarded, along with then-Coca-Cola Tigers mentor Chot Reyes as co-winner of the PBA Press Corps Coach of the Year Award.

In 2003, Gregorio became the full-time head coach of Purefoods, after Altamirano was tasked to head the San Miguel All-Stars team.

In the 2004–05 season, Gregorio coached the Purefoods team, retooled with amateur stars James Yap, Paul Artadi, Peter June Simon and the vastly improved Kerby Raymundo. Purefoods would have losing records in the 2004 Fiesta Conference. The team marginally improved to finish two quarterfinals' stints in the Philippine Cup and the 2005 Fiesta Conference.

The 2005–06 PBA season would be Gregorio's finest season yet, he would lead the Purefoods Chunkee Giants to two finals appearances, a runner-up finish in the 2005–06 Fiesta Conference, and a championship against Red Bull in the Philippine Cup Finals, winning in 6 games, 4–2. Prior to the finals meeting with Red Bull, he would bring his team back to life after being down 1–3 in the semifinals against Alaska. The series victory against Alaska would be remembered as one of the best comebacks in the PBA history. He once again coached his team to its second championship in the last four years. The 2006 success earned him his second Coach of the Year Award.

Gregorio started the 2007–2008 season with a bang. He led his team to a 5-game sweep of the pre-tournament games and would eventually bag the Pre-Tournament Championship. He would continue his mastery of the All-Filipino Conference as he led his team to a 7–0 start and finished with 12 wins and 6 losses, enough to push the team to the semifinals. He would lead his team to another trip to the Finals, his third. However, his team would eventually lose to Sta. Lucia in 7 games via a controversial series.

The 2008–09 PBA season became one of Gregorio's worst seasons. Starting center Rommel Adducul was diagnosed with throat cancer and forced Purefoods TJ Giants to trade key player Marc Pingris to San Miguel Beermen for big man Enrico Villanueva. This signaled a major revamp with Gregorio's team lineup and a losing season finishing with only 15 in 32 elimination round games. He only managed to stir his team through the wildcard in both conferences. His team would end both tournaments in controversies, a bottle-throwing incident between his player James Yap against assistant coach Koy Banal and the benching of reinforcement Marquin Chandler on separate do-or-die games the TJ Giants consequently lost.

Gregorio guided his team in the 2009–10 PBA season to a record 41 wins. James Yap would earn his 2nd season MVP award. With the return of old reliables Marc Pingris, Paul Artadi together with veteran center Rafi Reavis, and rookie standout Rico Maierhofer, his team would finish as champions in the 2009–10 PBA Philippine Cup Finals defeating the Alaska Aces, 4–0. The sweep is the first time in the history of the All-Filipino Conference.

This however marked the end of Gregorio's era as Llamados coach with his transfer to Meralco Bolts. He would eventually become the franchise's winningest and longest-tenured head coach with 3 championships in 8 seasons as Purefoods/B-Meg coach.

Gregorio was succeeded by his assistant and multi-titled Philippine Basketball League coach Jorge Gallent.

=== Meralco Bolts ===
In August 2010, Gregorio left B-Meg Derby Ace Llamados and signed a coaching deal with the Philippine Basketball Association returnee Manila Electric Company (Meralco Bolts). He is also concurrently part of Meralco's corporate staff as Assistant Vice President and Head of Meralco Sports and Youth Advocacy.

His five years coaching stint with the Bolts would prove to be dismal as he was unsuccessful to lead Meralco beyond the quarterfinals. Assortment of injuries to key players, and trades that hurt the team's chemistry contributed to the Bolts downfall.

In July 2014, Gregorio declined the offer to return as head coach. Instead, he opted to concentrate on his corporate affairs role with Meralco.

== Coaching record ==
=== Collegiate record ===
Season	Team	Finish	GP	W	L	PCT	PG	PW	PL	PCT	Results
2000	UP	6th	14	4	10	.286	–	–	–	–	Did not qualify
2001	UP	7th	14	6	8	.429	–	–	–	–	Did not qualify
2002	UP	6th	14	5	9	.357	–	–	–	–	Did not qualify
Totals			42	15	27	.357	0	0	0	.000	0 championships

== Commentary work ==
Gregorio also worked as an analyst for ABS-CBN for UAAP coverage in mid-2000s, and for PBA games.

== Personal life ==
Gregorio is married to Jin Salgado-Gregorio and has two children. One of them, Belle served as a courtside reporter for NU Bulldogs for season 84 of UAAP, and later in PBA. His brother Patrick, was a former executive of TNT Gropang Giga.

Preceded by Nic Jorge	UP Fighting Maroons men's basketball head coach 2000-2002	Succeeded by Lito Vergara
