= 2009–10 PBA season =

35th PBA season

- Duration: October 11, 2009 – August 18, 2010
- Teams: 10
- TV partner(s): Solar TV; Basketball TV; DZRJ 810 (Local); TFC (International)

2009 PBA Draft
- Top draft pick: Japeth Aguilar
- Picked by: Burger King Whoppers
- Season MVP: James Yap (B-Meg Derby Ace Llamados)
- Philippine Cup champions: Purefoods Tender Juicy Giants
- Philippine Cup runners-up: Alaska Aces
- Fiesta Conference champions: Alaska Aces
- Fiesta Conference runners-up: San Miguel Beermen

Seasons
- ← 2008–09 2010–11 →

The 2009–10 PBA season was the 35th season of the Philippine Basketball Association (PBA). The season formally opened on October 11, 2009, and ended on August 18, 2010. The league started the season with the Philippine Cup, or the traditional All-Filipino Conference, while finishing the season with the import-laiden Fiesta Conference.

The 2009 PBA Draft was held on August 2, 2009, at the Market! Market!, and Japeth Aguilar was selected first overall by the Air21 Express. The Puerto Princesa City Government hosted the 2010 PBA All-Star Weekend at the Puerto Princesa Coliseum in Palawan on April 25, 2010.

== Pre-season events ==
=== Player movement ===
Key transactions:
Trades:

- Burger King traded Arwind Santos to San Miguel for Marc Pingris and Ken Bono. Both players were later traded to Purefoods in exchange for the team's 2010 1st and 2nd round picks.
- Barangay Ginebra traded Paul Artadi, Rafi Reavis, and the rights to 2009 draftee Chris Timberlake for Enrico Villanueva, Rich Alvarez, Celino Cruz, and Paolo Bugia of Purefoods.
- Burger King traded Pocholo Villanueva to Ginebra for rights to rookie Orlando Daroya and future picks.
- Sta. Lucia traded Dennis Miranda to San Miguel for future draft picks.
- Sta. Lucia traded Dennis Espino to Coca-Cola for two future draft picks and Jason Misolas.

Signing:

- Rain or Shine signed Mike Hrabak.
- Coca-Cola signed Norman Gonzales.

Resigning:

- Barangay Ginebra re-signed center Eric Menk.

=== Rule changes ===
The PBA board approved the rule changes for implementation starting in the pre-season games:

Rule changes (effective for the 2009–10 PBA season)
# The three-point line's distance is set back to 22 feet. The line was previously 20.6 feet away from the basket.
1. The "key" is now a rectangle. It was previously the FIBA standard trapezoid key.
2. The 24-second violation will be ignored if the opposing team has clear possession of the basketball.
3. All parts of the backboard are considered in play when struck by the ball except the back of the backboard, which is not in play.
  1. The ball is considered out of bounds if the ball hits the top of the board and passes directly behind the backboard from any point.
  2. The ball is considered out of bounds if the ball hits the top of the board and then hits the game clock, shot clock, support or any device above the backboard.
  3. It is considered a violation attempting a field goal directly behind the backboard.
  4. Any ball that rebounds and goes over the top and passes directly behind the backboard without hitting any part of the board is considered out-of-bounds.
4. Hanging on the rim after a dunk is now allowed (monkey ride).
5. Landing spot rule:
  1. If without contact, Flagrant Foul Penalty 1 is called - two free throws are awarded, ball possession is retained by team of offended player, guilty player sits for (3) three playing minutes.
  2. If with contact, Flagrant Foul Penalty 2 is called - two free throws are awarded, team of offended player retains ball possession, and guilty player is ejected from the game. Automatic Fine of minimum P10,000.00. Minimum of one day suspension if contact resulted in dire consequence (i.e. injury to player resulting in inability to play).
6. A tip-in is considered act of shooting.
7. A player screening an opponent must have both feet on the floor when contact occurs. A player setting a screen can move his body into a new but equal position sideways provided his shoulders are directly squared with his foot.
8. The screener cannot lean forward towards the defender or extend any part of his body (i.e., extending an arm, leg or hips) in attempting to impede the basketball defender's movement in covering his man.
9. Pushing or bumping is illegal personal contact of an opponent in which a defensive player forcibly moves or attempts to move a shooter, cutter or dribbler wherein the offensive player is placed at a disadvantage. A foul will be called if the defender bumps 1) a shooter, 2) a cutter, 3) a dribbler who loses the ball.
10. Falling down to fake a foul (flopping) will not be tolerated. Referees will now give a warning on the first infraction. Subsequently, a technical foul will be given on the next violation.

=== Notable occurrences ===
- The third set of inductees for the PBA Hall of Fame were awarded on October 9 at the Shangri-la Hotel in Makati.
- The pre-season was started on September 25 but was cut short due to the onslaught of Typhoon Ondoy in Metro Manila.

== Opening ceremonies ==
The season began on October 11 with the Purefoods Tender Juicy Giants defeating the Burger King Whoppers, 90–83.

The muses for the participating teams are as follows:

Team	Muse
Smart Gilas	Jessica Mendoza
Alaska Aces	CJ Haravata
Barako Bull Energy Boosters	Nadine Wisher
Barangay Ginebra Kings	Anne Curtis
Burger King Whoppers	Karla Henry
Coca-Cola Tigers	Pokwang
Purefoods Tender Juicy Giants	Bianca Manalo
Rain or Shine Elasto Painters	Carla Abellana
San Miguel Beermen	SMB models
Sta. Lucia Realtors	Patricia Fernandez and Jennifer Barrientos
Talk 'N Text Tropang Texters	Rags to Riches mothers

== 2009–10 Philippine Cup ==
=== Notable events ===
- After playing with just one game with the Burger King Whoppers, top rookie pick Japeth Aguilar was traded to Talk 'N Text after a three-way trade involving Barako Bull. Burger Kings was able to get Barako Bull's 2010 (previously acquired by Talk ‘N Text) and 2012 first-round picks and will also take Talk ‘N Text’s 2013 and 2014 first-round picks. Barako Bull will now have the rights on Orlando Daroya while Talk ‘N Text will get Aguilar, who will be loaned to Smart Gilas.
- Wynne Arboleda of the Burger King Whoppers was suspended without pay for the rest of the season plus one game after a violent altercation with a fan during their game against Smart Gilas last October 16. He also drew a PhP20,000 fine. While serving his suspension, Arboleda cannot be present at the playing venues during Burger King’s games.
- On October 29, 2009. The PBA commissioner Sonny Barrios announced that the games played by the Smart Gilas National Team will have no effects on the standings of the other teams of the PBA. This decision was made by the commissioner because of the intensity of the games played against Smart Gilas that resulted in the suspension of and the possibility of criminal charges against Wynne Arboleda as a result of him attacking a fan at courtside in Araneta Coliseum when the Burger King Whoppers played the Smart Gilas National Team.
- Talk 'N Text walked out of the playing court during their quarterfinal game with Barangay Ginebra leading 27–20 with a minute left in the first quarter after Ranidel de Ocampo was called for a flagrant foul against Ronald Tubid. Besides forfeiting Game 4 to their opponent, Commissioner Sonny Barrios penalized the telecommunication franchise of fines ranging over P1 million. The P500,000 for the forfeiture (the said amount going to Barangay Ginebra as indicated to the league's by-laws), an additional P500,000 fine, which will go directly to the league's Players’ Educational Trust Fund, and the team's share in the gate receipts and TV revenues for that particular game, which ranges anywhere between P200,000 to P250,000.

=== Elimination round ===
Pos	Team	W	L	PCT	GB	Qualification
1	Alaska Aces	13	5	.722 (Note: Head-to-head record: Alaska 2–0 San Miguel)	—	Advance to semifinals
2	San Miguel Beermen	13	5	.722	—	Advance to semifinals
3	Purefoods Tender Juicy Giants	12	6	.667 (Note: Head-to-head record: Purefoods 1–1 Barangay Ginebra; Purefoods 0, Barangay Ginebra 0; overall point differential: Purefoods +85, Barangay Ginebra +75)	1	Advance to quarterfinals
4	Barangay Ginebra Kings	12	6	.667	1	Advance to quarterfinals
5	Talk 'N Text Tropang Texters	11	7	.611	2	Advance to quarterfinals
6	Sta. Lucia Realtors	10	8	.556	3	Advance to wildcard round
7	Coca-Cola Tigers	6	12	.333 (Note: Head-to-head record: Burger King 1–1, Coca-Cola; Burger King +10, Coca-Cola −10)	7	Advance to wildcard round
8	Burger King Whoppers	6	12	.333	7	Advance to wildcard round
9	Rain or Shine Elasto Painters	4	14	.222	9	Advance to wildcard round
10	Barako Bull Energy Boosters	3	15	.167	10	
—	Smart Gilas (G)	3	6	.333	5.5	Guest team (Note: Smart Gilas's results do not count in the standings.)

Source: PBA.ph
(G) Guests

=== Playoffs ===
Wildcard phase (Single elimination)
6	Sta. Lucia	86
9	Rain or Shine	90
7	Coca-Cola	118
8	Burger King	112

Wildcard phase (Single elimination)
9	Rain or Shine	99
7	Coca-Cola	84

Quarterfinals (Best-of-5)
3	Purefoods	3
9	Rain or Shine	2
4	Brgy. Ginebra	3
5	Talk 'N Text	2

Semifinals (Best-of-7)
2	San Miguel	2
3	Purefoods	4
1	Alaska	4
4	Brgy. Ginebra	0

Finals (Best-of-7)
3	Purefoods	4
1	Alaska	0
Third place
2	San Miguel	95
4	Brgy. Ginebra	88

==== Wildcard phase ====
===== 1st round =====
Team 1	Score	Team 2
(6) Sta. Lucia Realtors	86–90	(9) Rain or Shine Elasto Painters
(7) Coca-Cola Tigers	118–112	(8) Burger King Whoppers

===== 2nd round =====
Team 1	Score	Team 2
(7) Coca-Cola Tigers	99–84	(9) Rain or Shine Elasto Painters

==== Quarterfinals ====
Team 1	Series	Team 2	Game 1	Game 2	Game 3	Game 4	Game 5
(3) Purefoods Tender Juicy Giants	3–2	(9) Rain or Shine Elasto Painters	90–85	95–94	92–95	100–103	95–85
(4) Barangay Ginebra Kings	3–2	(5) Talk 'N Text Tropang Texters	92–107	105–106	102–97	27–20 (forfeit)	113–110

==== Semifinals ====
Team 1	Series	Team 2	Game 1	Game 2	Game 3	Game 4	Game 5	Game 6	Game 7
(1) Alaska Aces	4–0	(4) Barangay Ginebra Kings	104–79	90–82	91–88	102–95	—	—	—
(2) San Miguel Beermen	2–4	(3) Purefoods Tender Juicy Giants	99–83	84–103	88–74	84–97	82–94	78–87	—

==== Third place playoff ====
Team 1	Score	Team 2
(2) San Miguel Beermen	95–88	(4) Barangay Ginebra Kings

==== Finals ====
Team 1	Series	Team 2	Game 1	Game 2	Game 3	Game 4	Game 5	Game 6	Game 7
(1) Alaska Aces	0–4	(3) Purefoods Tender Juicy Giants	81–77	86–85	79–78	86–76	—	—	—

- Finals MVP: James Yap (Purefoods)
- Best Player of the Conference: James Yap (Purefoods)

== Mid-season break events ==
=== Player movement ===
Key transactions:
Trades:

- Air21 traded JR Quiñahan, Mark Yee and Aaron Aban to Talk 'N Text for Yancy de Ocampo and Renren Ritualo.
- Air21 traded Yancy de Ocampo and their second round pick for the 2010 PBA Draft to Barangay Ginebra for Rich Alvarez and Doug Kramer.
- Air21 traded Alex Cabagnot to San Miguel for Mike Cortez.
- Sta. Lucia Realtors traded Joseph Yeo to San Miguel for Bonbon Custodio.

=== Team re-brandings ===
- The Burger King Whoppers returned to their previous identity as the Air21 Express.
- San Miguel Corporation changed the name of the Purefoods Tender Juicy Giants to the Derby Ace Llamados.
- The Barako Bull Energy Boosters changed their moniker to the Barako Energy Coffee Masters.

=== Notable occurrences ===
- The board of governors approved stiffer penalties for teams that would walk out of a game and rookie draftees who would turn their back on the league.

== 2010 Fiesta Conference ==
=== Notable events ===
- Wynne Arboleda returned as an active player of the Air21 Express after he was reinstated by the Office of the Commissioner after serving eight months of suspension.

=== Elimination round ===
Pos	Team	W	L	PCT	GB	Qualification
1	Talk 'N Text Tropang Texters	15	3	.833	—	Advance to semifinals
2	San Miguel Beermen	13	5	.722 (Note: Second seed playoff: San Miguel 88, Derby Ace 83)	2	Advance to semifinals
3	Derby Ace Llamados	13	5	.722	2	Advance to quarterfinals
4	Alaska Aces	11	7	.611	4	Advance to quarterfinals
5	Barangay Ginebra Kings	9	9	.500 (Note: Fifth seed playoff: Barangay Ginebra 115, Rain or Shine 88)	6	Advance to quarterfinals
6	Rain or Shine Elasto Painters	9	9	.500	6	Advance to wildcard round
7	Coca-Cola Tigers	8	10	.444	7	Advance to wildcard round
8	Sta. Lucia Realtors	5	13	.278	10	Advance to wildcard round
9	Air21 Express	4	14	.222	11	Advance to wildcard round
10	Barako Energy Coffee Masters	3	15	.167	12	

Source: PBA.ph

=== Playoffs ===
Wildcard phase (Single elimination)
6	Rain or Shine	92
9	Air21	89
7	Coca-Cola	100
8	Sta. Lucia	84

Wildcard phase (Single elimination)
6	Rain or Shine	98
7	Coca-Cola	93

Quarterfinals (Best-of-5)
3	Derby Ace	3
6	Rain or Shine	2
4	Alaska	3
5	Brgy. Ginebra	2

Semifinals (Best-of-7)
2	San Miguel	4
3	Derby Ace	3
1	Talk 'N Text	3
4	Alaska	4

Finals (Best-of-7)
2	San Miguel	2
4	Alaska	4
Third place
3	Derby Ace	95
1	Talk 'N Text	113

==== Wildcard phase ====
===== 1st round =====
Team 1	Score	Team 2
(6) Rain or Shine Elasto Painters	92–81	(9) Air21 Express
(7) Coca Cola Tigers	100–84	(8) Sta. Lucia Realtors

===== 2nd round =====
Team 1	Score	Team 2
(6) Rain or Shine Elasto Painters	98–93	(7) Coca-Cola Tigers

===== Quarterfinals =====
Team 1	Series	Team 2	Game 1	Game 2	Game 3	Game 4	Game 5
(3) Derby Ace Llamados	3–2	(6) Rain or Shine Elasto Painters	108–102	69–79	111–117 (OT)	92–78	105–100 (OT)
(4) Alaska Aces	3–2	(5) Barangay Ginebra Kings	76–72	84–82	87–91	90–94	93–91

==== Semifinals ====
Team 1	Series	Team 2	Game 1	Game 2	Game 3	Game 4	Game 5	Game 6	Game 7
(1) Talk 'N Text Tropang Texters	3–4	(4) Alaska Aces	88–104	100–94	86–90	83–62	82–81	83–94	81–90
(2) San Miguel Beermen	4–2	(3) Derby Ace Llamados	101–88	94–95	74–70	83–75	82–88	91–83	—

==== Third place playoff ====
Team 1	Score	Team 2
(1) Talk 'N Text Tropang Texters	113–95	(3) Derby Ace Llamados

==== Finals ====
Team 1	Series	Team 2	Game 1	Game 2	Game 3	Game 4	Game 5	Game 6	Game 7
(2) San Miguel Beermen	2–4	(4) Alaska Aces	83–89	90–94	96–80	83–90	96–94	88–102	—

- Finals MVP: Cyrus Baguio and LA Tenorio (Alaska)
- Best Player of the Conference: Jay Washington (San Miguel)
- Best Import of the Conference: Gabe Freeman (San Miguel)

== 2010 PBA All-Star Weekend ==
The 2010 PBA All-Star Weekend was held from April 22 to 25 at the Puerto Princesa Coliseum, Puerto Princesa, Palawan. The winners were:

- Obstacle Challenge: Jonas Villanueva (San Miguel Beermen)
- Three-point Shootout: Mark Macapagal (Coca-Cola Tigers)
- Slam Dunk Competition: Niño Canaleta (Derby Ace Llamados)

=== Rookie-Sophomore Blitz Game ===
Solar TV / Basketball TV

April 23

Rookies 86, Sophomores 106
Scoring by quarter: 17–20, 31–20, 10–30, 29–36
Pts: Buenafe 25, Lanete 17, Cruz 14, Devance 14, Bono 10, Aljamal 8, Kramer 7, Eman 6.	Pts: Menor 19, Cruz 18, Urbiztondo 17, Ross 11, Marias 9, Timberlake 7, Arellano 6, Burtscher 0.

Puerto Princesa Coliseum, Puerto Princesa, Palawan

- Blitz Game MVP: Jared Dillinger (Sophomores)

=== All-Star Game ===
Solar TV / Basketball TV

April 27
6:30 p.m.

North All-Stars 133, South All-Stars 130
Scoring by quarter: 38–39, 38–30, 28–32, 29–29
Pts: Mark Cardona 20	Pts: Kelly Williams 17

Puerto Princesa Coliseum, Puerto Princesa, Palawan

- All-Star Game MVP: Gabe Norwood (North All-Stars)

== Awards ==
=== PBA Annual Awards ===
- Most Valuable Player: James Yap (Derby Ace)
- Rookie of the Year: Rico Maierhofer (Derby Ace)
- First Mythical Team:
  - LA Tenorio (Alaska)
  - James Yap (Derby Ace)
  - Jay Washington (San Miguel)
  - Arwind Santos (San Miguel)
  - Sonny Thoss (Alaska)
- Second Mythical Team:
  - Roger Yap (Derby Ace)
  - Mark Cardona (Talk 'N Text)
  - Joe Devance (Alaska)
  - Kelly Williams (Talk 'N Text)
  - Asi Taulava (Coca-Cola)
- All-Defensive Team:
  - Arwind Santos (San Miguel)
  - Marc Pingris (Derby Ace)
  - Gabe Norwood (Rain or Shine)
  - Roger Yap (Derby Ace)
  - Ryan Reyes (Talk 'N Text)
- Most Improved Player: LA Tenorio (Alaska)
- Sportsmanship Award: Cyrus Baguio (Alaska)

=== Awards given by the PBA Press Corps ===
- Coach of the Year: Ryan Gregorio (B-Meg Derby Ace)
- Mr. Quality Minutes: KG Canaleta (B-Meg Derby Ace)
- Comeback Player of the Year: Kelly Williams (Talk 'N Text)
- Executive of the Year: Wilfred Uytengsu (Alaska)
- Referee of the Year: Manolito Quilingen
- All-Rookie Team
  - Rico Maierhofer (B-Meg Derby Ace)
  - Josh Urbiztondo (Sta. Lucia)
  - Ronnie Matias (Air21)
  - Ogie Menor (Barako Bull)
  - Jervy Cruz (Rain or Shine)

== Cumulative standings ==
Pos	Team	Pld	W	L	PCT	Best finish
1	Talk 'N Text Tropang Texters	49	32	17	.653	Third place
2	San Miguel Beermen	56	36	20	.643	Finalist
3	Purefoods Tender Juicy Giants/Derby Ace Llamados	64	41	23	.641	Champions
4	Alaska Aces	62	39	23	.629	Champions
5	Barangay Ginebra Kings	52	27	25	.519	Semifinalist
6	Rain or Shine Elasto Painters	51	21	30	.412	Quarterfinalist
7	Coca-Cola Tigers	40	16	24	.400	2nd wildcard round
8	Sta. Lucia Realtors	38	15	23	.395	1st wildcard round
9	Air21 Express/Burger King Whoppers	38	10	28	.263	1st wildcard round
10	Barako Energy Coffee Masters/Barako Bull Energy Boosters	36	6	30	.167	Elimination round

=== Elimination rounds ===
Pos	Team	Pld	W	L	PCT
1	Talk 'N Text Tropang Texters	36	26	10	.722
2	San Miguel Beermen	36	26	10	.722
3	Purefoods Tender Juicy Giants/Derby Ace Llamados	36	25	11	.694
4	Alaska Aces	36	24	12	.667
5	Barangay Ginebra Kings	36	21	15	.583
6	Sta. Lucia Realtors	36	15	21	.417
7	Coca-Cola Tigers	36	14	22	.389
8	Rain or Shine Elasto Painters	36	13	23	.361
9	Air21 Express/Burger King Whoppers	36	10	26	.278
10	Barako Energy Coffee Masters/Barako Bull Energy Boosters	36	6	30	.167

=== Playoffs ===
Pos	Team	Pld	W	L
1	Purefoods Tender Juicy Giants/Derby Ace Llamados	28	16	12
2	Alaska Aces	26	15	11
3	San Miguel Beermen	20	10	10
4	Rain or Shine Elasto Painters	15	8	7
5	Talk 'N Text Tropang Texters	13	6	7
6	Barangay Ginebra Kings	16	6	10
7	Coca-Cola Tigers	4	2	2
8	Air21 Express/Burger King Whoppers	2	0	2
9	Sta. Lucia Realtors	2	0	2
10	Barako Energy Coffee Masters/Barako Bull Energy Boosters	0	0	0
