= Rafi Reavis =

Filipino-American basketball player (born 1977)

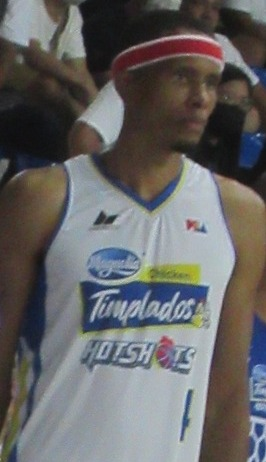
- Reavis in 2023

No. 4 – Phoenix Super LPG Fuel Masters
- Position: Center / power forward
- League: PBA

Personal information
- Born: July 27, 1977 (age 49) New York, New York, U.S.
- Listed height: 6 ft 8 in (2.03 m)
- Listed weight: 210 lb (95 kg)

Career information
- College: Coppin State (1995–1999)
- PBA draft: 2002: 1st round, 2nd overall pick
- Drafted by: Coca-Cola Tigers
- Playing career: 2000–present

Career history
- 2000–2001: San Juan Knights
- 2002–2006: Coca-Cola Tigers
- 2006–2009: Barangay Ginebra Kings
- 2009–2025: Purefoods Tender Juicy Giants/B-Meg Derby Ace Llamados/B-Meg Llamados/San Mig Coffee Mixers/San Mig Super Coffee Mixers/Purefoods Star Hotshots/Star Hotshots/Magnolia Hotshots Pambansang Manok/Magnolia Pambansang Manok Hotshots/Magnolia Chicken Timplados Hotshots
- 2026–present: Phoenix Super LPG Fuel Masters

Career highlights
- 11× PBA champion (2002 All-Filipino, 2003 Reinforced, 2006–07 Philippine, 2008 Fiesta, 2009–10 Philippine, 2012 Commissioner's, 2013 Governors', 2013–14 Philippine, 2014 Commissioner's, 2014 Governors', 2018 Governors'); 3× PBA All-Star (2006, 2017, 2018); PBA Most Improved Player (2003); PBA All-Defensive Team (2018); MBA National Champion (2000)

Rafael Reavis (born July 27, 1977) is a Filipino-American professional basketball player for the Phoenix Super LPG Fuel Masters of the Philippine Basketball Association (PBA). He played college basketball for the Coppin State Eagles.

== Professional career ==
Reavis first played for the San Juan Knights in the Metropolitan Basketball Association in 2000.

After the Metropolitan Basketball Association folded in 2002, Reavis decided to apply for the 2002 PBA draft, where he was picked second overall by the Coca-Cola Tigers.

He had a good run during his time with the Tigers before being involved in one of the most controversial trades in PBA history. The trade involved Rudy Hatfield, Billy Mamaril, Aries Dimaunahan, and Ervin Sotto.

Barangay Ginebra traded Reavis, Paul Artadi, and the rights to 2009 eighth pick overall Chris Timberlake for Enrico Villanueva, Rich Alvarez, Celino Cruz, and Paolo Bugia of Purefoods. Burger King acted as the conduit team, trading Pocholo Villanueva to Ginebra and acquiring the rights to 2009 Rookie draft 18th pick Orlando Daroya and future picks.

On September 27, 2025, Reavis signed with the Converge FiberXers. However, he never played a single game with the team.

On July 9, 2026, Reavis signed a one-conference contract with the Phoenix Super LPG Fuel Masters.

== PBA career statistics ==
Legend
GP	Games played	MPG	Minutes per game	FG%	Field-goal percentage
3FG%	3-point field-goal percentage	4P%	4-point field-goal percentage	FT%	Free-throw percentage
RPG	Rebounds per game	APG	Assists per game	SPG	Steals per game
BPG	Blocks per game	PPG	Points per game	127	Career high

As of the end of 2025–26 season

=== Season-by-season averages ===
Year	Team	GP	MPG	FG%	3P%	4P%	FT%	RPG	APG	SPG	BPG	PPG
2002	Coca-Cola	30	14.2	.513	.500	—	.486	3.8	.8	.2	.3	4.6
2003	Coca-Cola	65	28.3	.584	.000	—	.516	8.0	1.6	.8	.9	10.4
2004–05	Coca-Cola	59	31.2	.540	.143	—	.522	9.0	1.3	.7	1.1	8.9
2005–06	Coca-Cola	33	34.6	.523	.000	—	.566	11.2	1.1	.6	1.3	8.3
2006–07	Barangay Ginebra	30	26.4	.564	.000	—	.533	8.5	.9	.6	1.0	8.3
2007–08	Barangay Ginebra	35	25.9	.509	.000	—	.524	8.3	1.3	.6	.5	6.2
2008–09	Barangay Ginebra	33	19.0	.592	.000	—	.515	5.1	.9	.4	.6	4.6
2009–10	Purefoods / B-Meg Derby Ace	61	26.9	.529	—	—	.458	7.7	.8	.7	.8	5.5
2010–11	B-Meg Derby Ace	10	15.0	.481	—	—	.667	3.9	.4	.4	.6	3.0
2011–12	B-Meg	62	16.1	.488	—	—	.542	4.8	.8	.3	.6	4.2
2012–13	San Mig Coffee	60	16.3	.565	—	—	.598	4.0	.7	.3	.7	3.6
2013–14	San Mig Super Coffee	67	15.4	.505	.000	—	.614	4.3	.7	.3	.3	3.7
2014–15	Purefoods / Star	40	12.5	.569	—	—	.583	3.5	.4	.4	.6	2.2
2015–16	Star	27	11.5	.565	—	—	.545	3.6	.4	.1	.3	2.4
2016–17	Star	51	17.8	.579	.000	—	.656	5.0	.7	.5	.8	4.8
2017–18	Magnolia	53	19.8	.443	.000	—	.559	5.0	1.1	.8	.7	4.0
2019	Magnolia	42	21.9	.514	—	—	.652	6.2	.5	.7	.5	5.5
2020	Magnolia	11	28.1	.471	—	—	.706	6.5	1.4	.4	.5	4.0
2021	Magnolia	38	18.8	.500	—	—	.585	4.6	.6	.5	.3	2.6
2022–23	Magnolia	36	10.4	.535	.000	—	.654	2.2	.5	.2	.3	1.8
2023–24	Magnolia	21	8.6	.567	—	—	.500	2.4	.3	.3	.1	1.7
2024–25	Magnolia	17	6.1	.417	—	—	.625	2.5	.2	.2	.1	.9
2025–26	Phoenix Super LPG	4	1.8	.000	—	—	—	.5	—	—	—	—
Career		885	20.0	.533	.094	—	.550	5.7	.8	.5	.6	5.0

== Personal life ==
Reavis was born as Rafael Pangilinan Reavis on July 27, 1977, in New York City. His father is Joselito Abundo and was born on Koronadal, South Cotabato. Abundo went to the US when he was 17 and was adopted by the Reavis family. Abundo met Reavis' mother, Laura Missouri, in New York City. After three years, they broke up, and Reavis went with his mother in Florida where his mother married and became Laura Fields. Abundo died in 1999 due to prostate cancer.

Reavis can speak Tagalog but prefers to speak only English.
