= 2009–10 PBA Philippine Cup =

Basketball tournament held in Philippines

- Duration: October 11, 2009 – March 3, 2010
- TV partner(s): Solar TV, Basketball TV (local); The Filipino Channel (international)

Finals
- Champions: Purefoods Tender Juicy Giants
- Runners-up: Alaska Aces

Awards
- Best Player: James Yap (Purefoods Tender Juicy Giants)
- Finals MVP: James Yap (Purefoods Tender Juicy Giants)

PBA Philippine Cup chronology
- < 2008–09 2010–11 >

PBA conference chronology
- < 2009 Fiesta 2010 Fiesta >

The 2009–10 Philippine Basketball Association (PBA) Philippine Cup or known as the 2009–10 KFC PBA Philippine Cup for sponsorship reasons, was the first conference of the 2009–10 PBA season. The tournament started on October 11, 2009, and ended on March 3, 2010. The conference featured Smart Gilas as guest team. The tournament is an All-Filipino format, which doesn't require an import or a pure-foreign player for each team.

== Format ==
The following format will be observed for the duration of the conference:

- Double-round robin eliminations; 18 games per team; Teams are then seeded by basis on win–loss records. Ties are broken among points differences of the tied teams. Guest team Smart Gilas will only compete for the first round of eliminations and result of its games will not reflect on the standings of its opponents.
- Teams seeded #6, #7, #8 and #9 play in a knockout wildcard playoffs for the final berth in the quarterfinals. Matchups are:
  - #6 team vs. #9 team
  - #7 team vs. #8 team
  - Winners of the first round for the last quarterfinal berth.
- #3, #4 and #5 teams automatically advance to the best of five quarterfinals:
  - #3 team vs. winner of wildcard playoffs
  - #4 vs. #5 teams
- #1 and #2 teams automatically advance to the best of seven semifinals:
  - Winner of first quarterfinal vs. #1
  - Winner of second quarterfinal vs. #2
- The winners in the semifinals advance to the best of seven Finals. The losers dispute the third-place trophy in a one-game playoff.

== Elimination round ==
=== Team standings ===
Pos	Team	W	L	PCT	GB	Qualification
1	Alaska Aces	13	5	.722 (Note: Head-to-head record: Alaska 2–0 San Miguel)	—	Advance to semifinals
2	San Miguel Beermen	13	5	.722	—	Advance to semifinals
3	Purefoods Tender Juicy Giants	12	6	.667 (Note: Head-to-head record: Purefoods 1–1 Barangay Ginebra; Purefoods 0, Barangay Ginebra 0; overall point differential: Purefoods +85, Barangay Ginebra +75)	1	Advance to quarterfinals
4	Barangay Ginebra Kings	12	6	.667	1	Advance to quarterfinals
5	Talk 'N Text Tropang Texters	11	7	.611	2	Advance to quarterfinals
6	Sta. Lucia Realtors	10	8	.556	3	Advance to wildcard round
7	Coca-Cola Tigers	6	12	.333 (Note: Head-to-head record: Burger King 1–1, Coca-Cola; Burger King +10, Coca-Cola −10)	7	Advance to wildcard round
8	Burger King Whoppers	6	12	.333	7	Advance to wildcard round
9	Rain or Shine Elasto Painters	4	14	.222	9	Advance to wildcard round
10	Barako Bull Energy Boosters	3	15	.167	10	
—	Smart Gilas (G)	3	6	.333	5.5	Guest team (Note: Smart Gilas's results do not count in the standings.)

Source: PBA.ph
(G) Guests

=== Schedule ===
	Round 1									Round 2								
Team ╲ Game	1	2	3	4	5	6	7	8	9	10	11	12	13	14	15	16	17	18
Alaska	BBE	SMB	Coke	BGK	SLR	BKW	ROS	TNT	PF	BBE	SMB	TNT	Coke	BGK	SLR	PF	BKW	ROS
Barako Bull	ALA	Coke	PF	ROS	BGK	TNT	SMB	BKW	SLR	ALA	BGK	PF	BKW	ROS	SMB	TNT	SLR	Coke
Barangay Ginebra	SMB	PF	ALA	BBE	ROS	BKW	SLR	TNT	Coke	BBE	PF	ROS	SLR	SMB	Coke	TNT	ALA	BKW
Burger King	PF	SMB	ROS	SLR	ALA	BGK	Coke	BBE	TNT	SMB	ROS	TNT	Coke	BBE	PF	SLR	BGK	ALA
Coca-Cola	SLR	BBE	ALA	PF	TNT	BKW	SMB	ROS	BGK	PF	TNT	SLR	BKW	ALA	BGK	SMB	ROS	BBE
Purefoods	BKW	BGK	BBE	Coke	TNT	SMB	ROS	ALA	SLR	Coke	BGK	BBE	SMB	TNT	BKW	ROS	ALA	SLR
Rain or Shine	TNT	SLR	BKW	BBE	SMB	BGK	ALA	PF	Coke	TNT	BKW	BGK	SMB	BBE	SLR	PF	Coke	ALA
San Miguel	BGK	ALA	BKW	TNT	ROS	SLR	PF	BBE	Coke	BKW	SLR	ALA	PF	ROS	BGK	BBE	Coke	TNT
Sta. Lucia	Coke	ROS	TNT	BKW	ALA	SMB	BGK	BBE	PF	SMB	Coke	BGK	TNT	ROS	BKW	ALA	BBE	PF
Talk 'N Text	ROS	SLR	SMB	PF	Coke	BBE	ALA	BGK	BKW	ROS	Coke	BKW	ALA	PF	SLR	BGK	BBE	SMB

= Win; = OT win; = Loss; = OT loss

=== Results ===
Team	ALA	BBE	BGK	BKW	COKE	PF	ROS	SG	SLR	SMB	TNT
Alaska		99–83	105–96	87–73	100–79	101–87	81–86	130–99	91–83	85–74	110–106
Barako Bull	88–99		86–94	86–102	83–71	77–92	89–81	96–91	77–80*	89–104	90–93
Barangay Ginebra	93–90	88–76		83–79	113–104	95–87	86–77	100–72	72–93	98–86	72–87
Burger King	87–80	102–99	104–122		91–89	83–90	89–91	115–105	93–101	99–117	105–118
Coca-Cola	105–92	91–89	97–106	106–94		93–79	84–92	93–98	76–95	84–107	94–103
Purefoods	94–77	70–66	89–81	85–74	88–79		103–69	99–81	68–63	76–92	108–102
Rain or Shine	94–95	88–72	97–101	99–101	83–105	88–101		89–96	90–95*	77–93	76–85
Smart Gilas									95–96	109–96	70–103
Sta. Lucia	77–85	108–96	93–88	83–79	98–92	78–88	95–91			94–110	83–100
San Miguel	116–122*	94–85	91–86*	100–85	107–118	87–80	104–90		95–96		100–90
Talk 'N Text	113–119*	97–99	82–105	115–104	107–104	101–98	93–95		117–112	93–91	

Legend: Blue = left column team win; Red = top row team win.
Matches with lighter background shading were decided after overtime.

== Bracket ==
Wildcard phase (Single elimination)
6	Sta. Lucia	86
9	Rain or Shine	90
7	Coca-Cola	118
8	Burger King	112

Wildcard phase (Single elimination)
9	Rain or Shine	99
7	Coca-Cola	84

Quarterfinals (Best-of-5)
3	Purefoods	3
9	Rain or Shine	2
4	Brgy. Ginebra	3
5	Talk 'N Text	2

Semifinals (Best-of-7)
2	San Miguel	2
3	Purefoods	4
1	Alaska	4
4	Brgy. Ginebra	0

Finals (Best-of-7)
3	Purefoods	4
1	Alaska	0
Third place
2	San Miguel	95
4	Brgy. Ginebra	88

== Wildcard phase ==
=== First round ===
January 24

Sta. Lucia Realtors 86, Rain or Shine Elasto Painters 90

Ynares Center, Antipolo, Rizal

January 24

Coca-Cola Tigers 118, Burger King Whoppers 112

Ynares Center, Antipolo, Rizal

=== Second round ===
January 27

Coca-Cola Tigers 84, Rain or Shine Elasto Painters 99

Ynares Center, Antipolo, Rizal

== Quarterfinals ==
=== (3) Purefoods vs. (6) Rain or Shine ===
January 29

Purefoods Tender Juicy Giants 90, Rain or Shine Elasto Painters 85

Araneta Coliseum, Quezon City

January 31

Purefoods Tender Juicy Giants 95, Rain or Shine Elasto Painters 94

Araneta Coliseum, Quezon City

February 3

Purefoods Tender Juicy Giants 92, Rain or Shine Elasto Painters 95

Araneta Coliseum, Quezon City

February 5

Purefoods Tender Juicy Giants 100, Rain or Shine Elasto Painters 103

Araneta Coliseum, Quezon City

February 7

Purefoods Tender Juicy Giants 95, Rain or Shine Elasto Painters 85
Purefoods wins series 3–2

Araneta Coliseum, Quezon City

=== (4) Barangay Ginebra vs. (5) Talk 'N Text ===
January 29

Barangay Ginebra Kings 92, Talk 'N Text Tropang Texters 107

Araneta Coliseum, Quezon City

January 31

Barangay Ginebra Kings 105, Talk 'N Text Tropang Texters 106

Araneta Coliseum, Quezon City

February 3

Barangay Ginebra Kings 102, Talk 'N Text Tropang Texters 97

Araneta Coliseum, Quezon City

February 5

Barangay Ginebra Kings 27, Talk 'N Text Tropang Texters 20 (forfeit)
Talk 'N Text walked out of the playing court with Barangay Ginebra leading 27–20 with a minute left in the first quarter after Ranidel de Ocampo was called for a flagrant foul against Ronald Tubid.

Araneta Coliseum, Quezon City

February 7

Barangay Ginebra Kings 113, Talk 'N Text Tropang Texters 100
Barangay Ginebra wins series 3–2

Araneta Coliseum, Quezon City

== Semifinals ==
=== (1) Alaska vs. (4) Barangay Ginebra ===
February 10

Alaska Aces 104, Barangay Ginebra Kings 79

Araneta Coliseum, Quezon City

February 12

Alaska Aces 90, Barangay Ginebra Kings 82

Cuneta Astrodome, Pasay

February 14

Alaska Aces 91, Barangay Ginebra Kings 88

Araneta Coliseum, Quezon City

February 17

Alaska Aces 102, Barangay Ginebra Kings 95
Alaska wins series 4–0

Araneta Coliseum, Quezon City

=== (2) San Miguel vs. (3) Purefoods ===
February 10

San Miguel Beermen 99, Purefoods Tender Juicy Giants 83

Araneta Coliseum, Quezon City

February 12

San Miguel Beermen 84, Purefoods Tender Juicy Giants 103

Cuneta Astrodome, Pasay

February 14

San Miguel Beermen 88, Purefoods Tender Juicy Giants 74

Araneta Coliseum, Quezon City

February 17

San Miguel Beermen 84, Purefoods Tender Juicy Giants 97

Araneta Coliseum, Quezon City

February 19

San Miguel Beermen 82, Purefoods Tender Juicy Giants 94

Araneta Coliseum, Quezon City

February 21

San Miguel Beermen 78, Purefoods Tender Juicy Giants 87
Purefoods wins series 4–2

Cuneta Astrodome, Pasay

== Third place playoff ==
February 24

San Miguel Beermen 95, Barangay Ginebra Kings 88

Araneta Coliseum, Quezon City

== Finals ==
February 24

Alaska Aces 77, Purefoods Tender Juicy Giants 81

Araneta Coliseum, Quezon City

February 26

Alaska Aces 85, Purefoods Tender Juicy Giants 86

Araneta Coliseum, Quezon City

February 28

Alaska Aces 78, Purefoods Tender Juicy Giants 79

Araneta Coliseum, Quezon City

March 3

Alaska Aces 76, Purefoods Tender Juicy Giants 86
Purefoods wins series 4–0

Araneta Coliseum, Quezon City
