= Marc Pingris =

Filipino basketball player (born 1981)

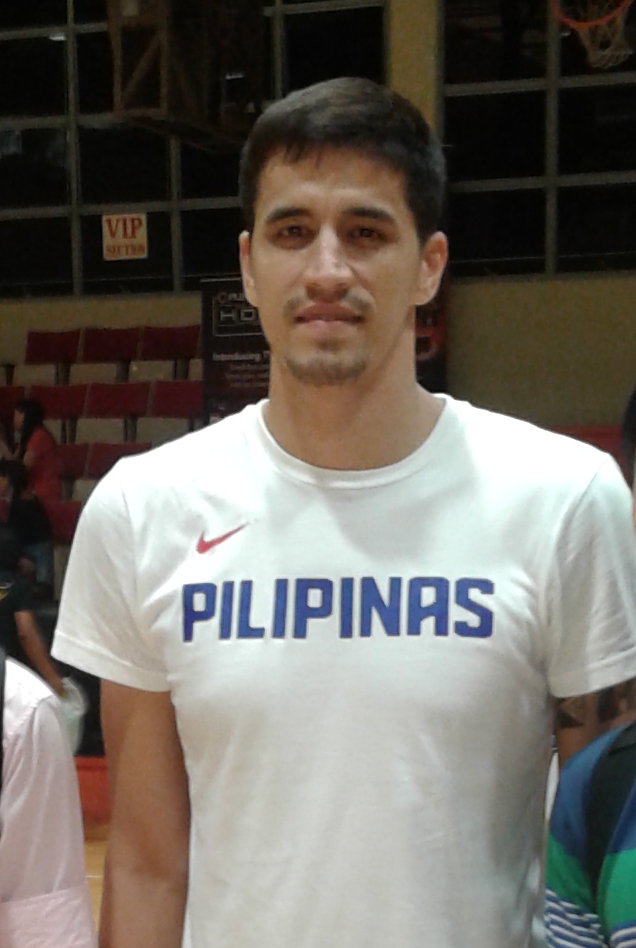
- Pingris in 2014

No. 15 – Biñan Tatak Gel
- Title: Power forward
- League: MPBL

Personal information
- Born: October 16, 1981 (age 45) Pozorrubio, Pangasinan, Philippines
- Listed height: 6 ft 4 in (1.93 m)
- Listed weight: 215 lb (98 kg)

Career information
- College: PSBA; FEU
- PBA draft: 2004: 1st round, 3rd overall pick
- Drafted by: FedEx Express
- Playing career: 2002–2019, 2023–present
- Position: Power forward
- Number: 16, 15
- Coaching career: 2022–present

Career history

Playing
- 2002: Cebu Gems
- 2004–2005: FedEx Express
- 2005–2008: Purefoods Chunkee Giants / Purefoods Tender Juicy Giants
- 2008–2009: Magnolia Beverage Masters / San Miguel Beermen
- 2009–2019: Purefoods / B-Meg / San Mig Coffee / Star / Magnolia
- 2023: Imus SV Squad
- 2023–present: Biñan Tatak Gel

Coaching
- 2022: Philippines (assistant)

Career highlights
- 9× PBA champion (2006 Philippine, 2009 Fiesta, 2009–10 Philippine, 2012 Commissioner's, 2013 Governors', 2013–14 Philippine, 2014 Commissioner's, 2014 Governor's, 2018 Governors'); 2× PBA Finals MVP (2006 Philippine, 2013 Governors'); 15× PBA All-Star (2005–2019); PBA All-Star Game MVP (2011); PBA Most Improved Player (2006); 3× PBA Mythical Second Team (2006, 2013, 2014); 3× PBA Defensive Player of the Year (2006, 2013, 2014); 8× PBA All-Defensive Team (2006, 2008, 2010–2014, 2016); 50 Greatest Players in PBA History (2015 selection); MPBL All-Star (2024); No. 15 retired by Magnolia Hotshots

Jean Marc Prado Pingris Jr. (born October 16, 1981) is a Filipino professional basketball player for the Biñan Tatak Gel of the Maharlika Pilipinas Basketball League (MPBL). Regarded as an all-time great in Philippine basketball, he was named one of the Philippine Basketball Association's 40 Greatest Players.

He spent 14 seasons with the Purefoods franchise where he established his reputation as perhaps the best defender in the PBA for a long period of time and led them alongside James Yap and Peter June Simon to four-straight titles and a rare PBA Grand Slam as the San Mig Coffee Mixers in 2013–2014.

Born in Pozorrubio, Pangasinan, Pingris started his career in the PBA being picked third overall at the 2004 PBA draft by FedEx, and was traded to Purefoods after a few games. After spending three years with Purefoods, he was traded to San Miguel and was traded back again after a year.

He represented the Philippines and contributed heavily when they bagged the silver medal in the 2013 FIBA Asia Championship that sent them to the 2014 FIBA World Cup. He currently serves as an assistant coach for the Philippine national team.

== Early life and amateur career ==
Marc Pingris was born on October 16, 1981, to Jean Marc Pingris Sr. and Erlinda Prado, a former saleswoman at SM Cubao. When Pingris was three years old, his father left for work in Morocco and separated from the family.

Pingris idolized Michael Jordan. After his classes, he would study his lessons and do his homework then go to their barangay court to practice his "Jordan-like" skills in basketball. When he had no classes he would call up his friends and play basketball in other barangays. In high school, Pingris tried to play in their school try-outs but he was not accepted, but when he was in 2nd year he was finally accepted to their school's varsity team. During his collegiate years, he would go play for the varsity basketball team of the Philippine School of Business Administration. However, he started his career at the Far Eastern University, Manila where he was formally discovered.

Struggling financially, he once told in an interview that he had to practically eat left-overs of his teammates because he couldn't afford a meal and promised himself that he'd be able "to eat a delicious & nice meal someday".

He also played for the Cebu Gems in the Metropolitan Basketball Association and for the Welcoat Paints in the Philippine Basketball League before declaring for the PBA draft.

== Professional career ==
=== FedEx (2004–2005) ===
Pingris was selected by the FedEx Express with the 3rd overall pick in the 2004 PBA draft. The draft also featured two of his future teammates, Yap and Artadi from UE. Pingris played a few games with Air21 prior to the trade that sent him to the Purefoods TJ Hotdogs.

=== Purefoods (2005–2008) ===
He was traded to Purefoods after having played a few games with the Express. He was traded along with Egay Billones. In the 2005–06 PBA season, he was awarded with the Finals MVP in the 2006 PBA Philippine Cup as Purefoods defeated Red Bull, 4–2. In game 2 of the finals of the 2006 season, he scored 21 points to lead Purefoods to a 93–82 win. In the 2007–08 PBA Philippine Cup finals, he grabbed a career-high 21 rebounds, leading to his new nickname, the rebounding demon.

=== Magnolia/San Miguel (2008–2009) ===
When Purefoods center Rommel Adducul was diagnosed with nasopharynx cancer, Pingris was shipped to the Magnolia Beverage Masters for center Enrico Villanueva at the start of the 2008 PBA Fiesta Conference. Pingris played his first game for Magnolia as a starter, going up against his former team, Purefoods.

=== Pingris–Santos trade ===
Before the 2009–10 PBA season, Pingris and Magnolia teammate Ken Bono were traded to the Burger King Whoppers for superstar Arwind Santos and San Miguel's 2010 first-round pick. In a Manila Bulletin interview, Burger King team owner Lito Alvarez further explained the trade: “The reason lang natagalan itong negotiation is we want a draft pick, not a player sa package because we already have 17 players including the three picks we’ll have in this Sunday’s draft.”

=== Return to Purefoods (2009–2019) ===
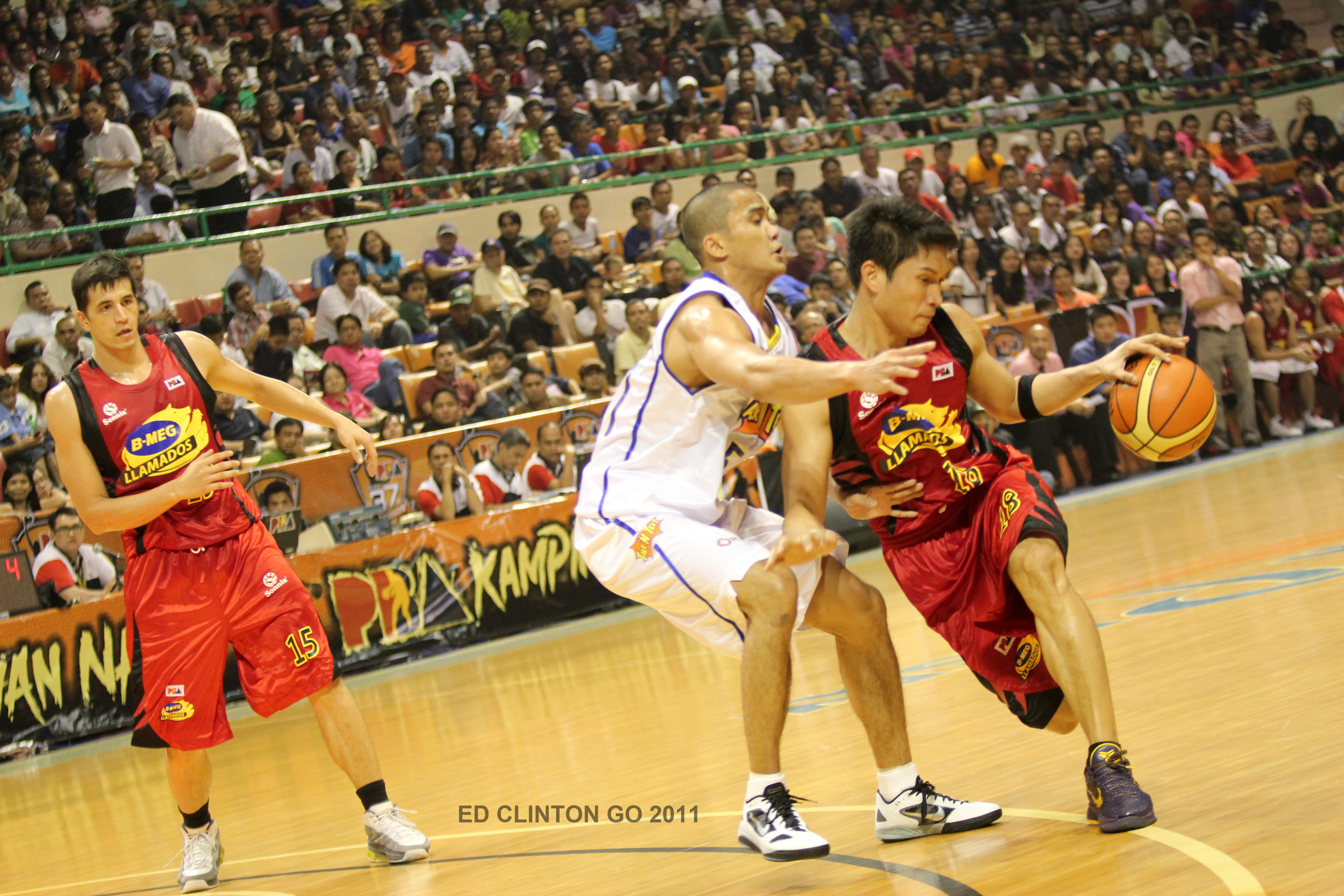
Pingris (left) watches his teammate James Yap drive against Aaron Aban of Talk 'N Text Tropang Texters

Barely 24 hours after being shipped to Burger King, Pingris was released to the Purefoods TJ Giants after Purefoods agreed to surrender its first and second-round picks in 2010 to Burger King. Pingris' return to Purefoods was confirmed by board governor Rene Pardo in an interview with GMANews.TV: "We have agreed to trade our first and second round picks next year to Burger King for Pingris."

Burger King Whoppers' board representative and then-incoming PBA chairman Lito Alvarez said that he felt that the trade was good for both teams, as Purefoods needed Pingris more, while the Whoppers planned to rebuild with their future draftees.

In the Llamados' second game during the 2012 PBA Commissioner's Cup, Pingris grabbed five rebounds, making him the 42nd member of the league's 1,000 Offensive Rebound Club. For all of his hard work and contributions in the B-Meg's 2012 PBA Commissioner's Cup championship run, Pingris was aptly nicknamed "Pinoy Sakuragi". On October 14, 2016, Pingris was recognized during the PBA Leo Awards Night as he was named to the PBA All-Defensive Team.

=== Retirement and return (2019–2023) ===
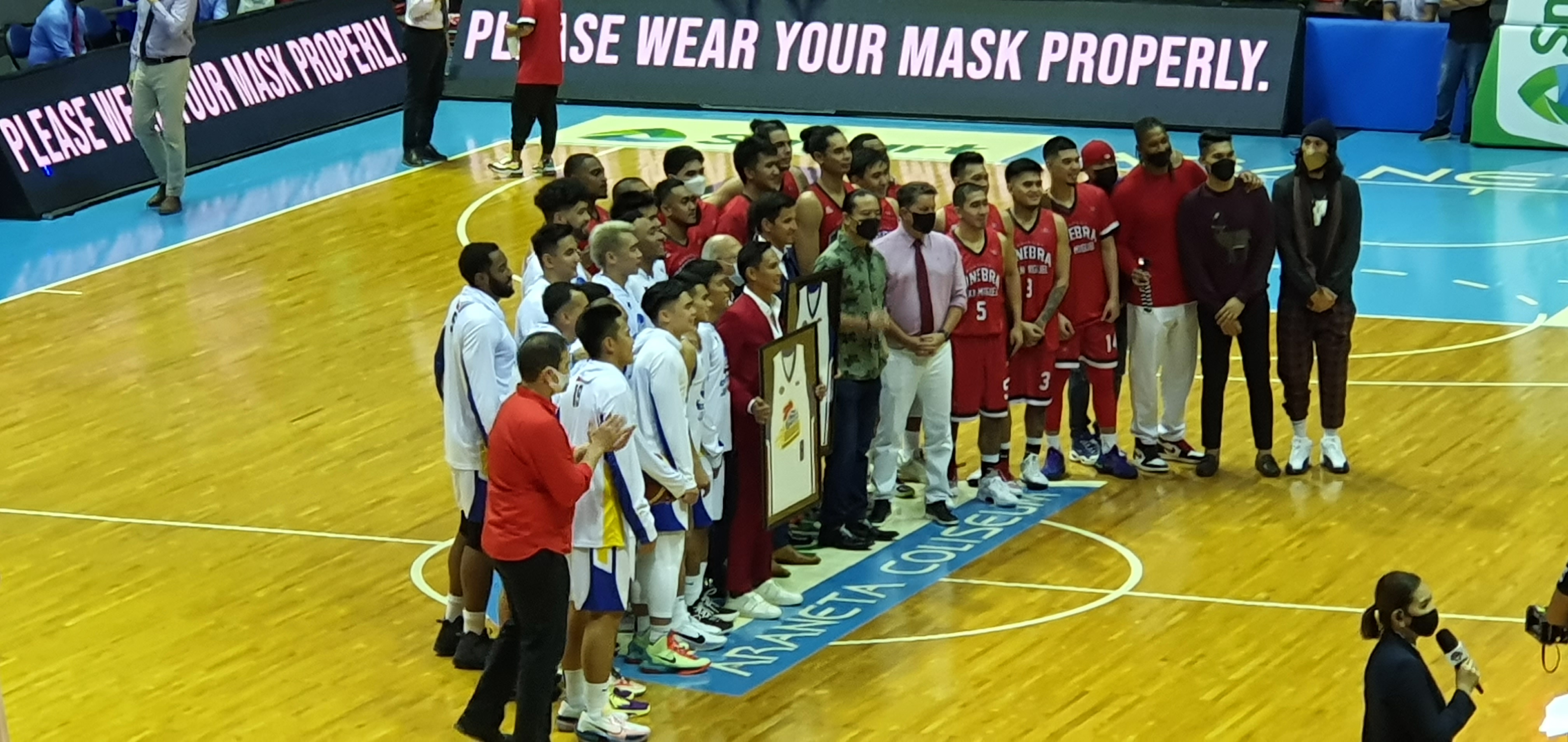
Mark Pingris and Peter June Simon poses with their framed retired jerseys together with the players of Magnolia Hotshots and Barangay Ginebra San Miguel during their jersey retirement ceremony held at halftime between the two teams on December 25, 2021.

Pingris was to play for the Magnolia Hotshots in the PBA bubble during the 2020 season which was set up in late 2020 due to the COVID-19 pandemic, but was unable to play for the team due to an injury. Pingris contract with the team expired on December 31, 2020, becoming a restricted free agent. He announced his retirement from competitive basketball in May 2021, after 16 years of playing in the PBA.

On November 24, 2021, Pingris signed with the Nueva Ecija Rice Vanguards of the Maharlika Pilipinas Basketball League. However, on December 3, he deferred himself from playing with Nueva Ecija, stating his unreadiness on coming out from retirement.

=== Imus SV Squad (2023) ===
Pingris formally came out of retirement after signing a contract with another MPBL team, Imus SV Squad.

== Sports administration ==
In January 2022, Pingris was appointed as commissioner of the Pilipinas Super League, a newly established league at the time.

== PBA career statistics ==
Legend
| GP | Games played | MPG | Minutes per game |
| FG% | Field-goal percentage | 3P% | 3-point field-goal percentage | FT% | Free-throw percentage |
| RPG | Rebounds per game | APG | Assists per game | SPG | Steals per game |
| BPG | Blocks per game | PPG | Points per game | **Bold** | Career high |

=== Season-by-season averages ===
| Year | Team | GP | MPG | FG% | 3P% | FT% | RPG | APG | SPG | BPG | PPG |
|---|---|---|---|---|---|---|---|---|---|---|---|
| 2004–05 | FedEx | 55 | 13.6 | .569 | .000 | .548 | 3.1 | .4 | .4 | .4 | 4.6 |
| 2005–06 | Purefoods | 57 | 27.9 | .515 | .000 | .606 | 8.5 | .9 | .4 | **1.6** | 8.9 |
| 2006–07 | Purefoods | 24 | 29.0 | **.588** | — | .509 | 9.2 | 1.1 | .5 | 1.3 | 8.1 |
| 2007–08 | Purefoods | 60 | 29.0 | .538 | — | .603 | 8.1 | 1.2 | .4 | 1.0 | 8.4 |
| 2007–08 | Magnolia | 60 | 29.0 | .538 | — | .603 | 8.1 | 1.2 | .4 | 1.0 | 8.4 |
| 2008–09 | San Miguel | 40 | 22.4 | .571 | .000 | .621 | 5.9 | 1.5 | .2 | .7 | 6.8 |
| 2009–10 | Purefoods / B-Meg Derby Ace | 61 | 32.0 | .519 | .000 | .545 | 8.0 | 1.4 | .6 | .7 | 7.3 |
| 2010–11 | B-Meg Derby Ace | 34 | 32.3 | .564 | .000 | .693 | **9.4** | 1.4 | **.7** | .9 | **9.8** |
| 2011–12 | B-Meg | 59 | 28.4 | .571 | .000 | .596 | 7.2 | 1.9 | .4 | .6 | 7.3 |
| 2012–13 | San Mig Coffee | 57 | 31.4 | .563 | .000 | .623 | 7.8 | 2.5 | .6 | .9 | 9.2 |
| 2013–14 | San Mig Super Coffee | **68** | **32.8** | .501 | .000 | .615 | 7.4 | 2.7 | **.7** | .8 | **9.8** |
| 2014–15 | Purefoods / Star | 43 | 31.3 | .538 | — | .631 | 7.2 | 2.5 | .5 | .2 | 7.9 |
| 2015–16 | Star | 35 | 31.0 | .516 | .000 | .607 | 6.8 | 2.1 | .4 | .4 | 9.2 |
| 2016–17 | Star | 32 | 28.7 | .522 | — | **.701** | 7.8 | 2.6 | .6 | .9 | 8.1 |
| 2017–18 | Magnolia | 12 | 31.0 | .485 | — | .583 | 9.3 | **3.1** | **.7** | 1.1 | 6.7 |
| 2019 | Magnolia | 21 | 14.7 | .525 | — | .429 | 3.7 | .8 | .3 | .5 | 3.4 |
| Career | | 658 | 28.0 | .537 | .000 | .602 | 7.3 | 1.7 | .5 | .8 | 7.9 |

== Personal life ==
Pingris is married to actress Danica Sotto, daughter of Vic Sotto and Dina Bonnevie. They have three children, a son named Jean Michael, a daughter named Anielle Micaela or Caela, and Jean Luc who was born in January 2023.

Pingris considers Slam Dunk as his favorite anime and its protagonist Hanamichi Sakuragi his favorite cartoon character, from which he earned the nickname "Sakuragi".
