= PBA All-Star Game Most Valuable Player award =

Sports award

The Philippine Basketball Association All-Star Game Most Valuable Player (MVP) is an annual Philippine Basketball Association (PBA) award given to the player(s) voted best of the annual All-Star Game.

== Winners ==
| Year | MVP (PBA team) |
|---|---|
| 1989 | Elmer Cabahug* (Alaska Milkmen) |
| 1990 | Samboy Lim (San Miguel Beermen) |
| 1991 | Alvin Patrimonio (Purefoods Tender Juicy Hotdogs) |
| 1992 | Alvin Teng (San Miguel Beermen) |
| 1993 | Allan Caidic (San Miguel Beermen) |
| 1994 | Benjie Paras (Shell Rimula X) |
| 1995 | Vergel Meneses (Sunkist Orange Juicers) |
| 1996 | Kenneth Duremdes (Sunkist Orange Bottlers) |
| 1997 | Bal David (Gordon's Gin Boars) |
| 1998 | Vergel Meneses (Pop Cola 800s) |
| 1999 | Benjie Paras (Formula Shell Zoom Masters) |
| 2000 | Vergel Meneses (Barangay Ginebra Kings) |
| 2001 | Danny Ildefonso (San Miguel Beermen) |
| 2002 | No game held |
| 2003 | Vergel Meneses (FedEx Express) |
| 2004 | Asi Taulava (Talk 'N Text Phone Pals); Jimmy Alapag (Talk 'N Text Phone Pals) (co-winners) |
| 2005 | Jayjay Helterbrand (Barangay Ginebra Kings) |
| 2006 | Asi Taulava (Talk 'N Text Phone Pals) |
| 2007 | Willie Miller (Alaska Aces); Jayjay Helterbrand (Barangay Ginebra Kings) (co-winners) |
| 2008 | Peter June Simon (Purefoods Tender Juicy Giants) |
| 2009 | David Noel** (Barangay Ginebra Kings) |
| 2010 | Gabe Norwood (Rain or Shine) |
| 2011 | Marc Pingris (B-Meg Derby Ace Llamados) |
| 2012 | James Yap (B-Meg Llamados) |
| 2013 | Jeff Chan (Rain or Shine); Arwind Santos (Petron Blaze Boosters) (co-winners) |
| 2014 | Gary David (Meralco) |
| 2015 | Terrence Romeo (GlobalPort Batang Pier) |
| 2016 | Alex Cabagnot (San Miguel Beermen) |
| 2017 Mindanao | Troy Rosario (TNT KaTropa); Matthew Wright (Phoenix Fuel Masters) (co-winners) |
| 2017 Luzon | Matthew Wright (Phoenix Fuel Masters) |
| 2017 Visayas | Terrence Romeo (GlobalPort Batang Pier) |
| 2018 Mindanao | Baser Amer (Meralco Bolts) |
| 2018 Luzon | Terrence Romeo (TNT KaTropa) |
| 2018 Visayas | Jeff Chan (Phoenix Fuel Masters) |
| 2019 | Japeth Aguilar (Barangay Ginebra San Miguel); Arwind Santos (San Miguel Beermen) (co-winners) |
| 2023 | Paul Lee (Magnolia Chicken Timplados Hotshots) |
| 2024 | Japeth Aguilar (Barangay Ginebra San Miguel); Robert Bolick (NLEX Road Warriors) (co-winners) |
| 2025 | Cancelled |
| 2026 | Japeth Aguilar (Barangay Ginebra San Miguel) |

- * MVP from losing team.
- ** MVP was Import Player.

== Multiple time winners ==
| Total | Player |
|---|---|
| 4 | Vergel Meneses |
| 3 | Japeth Aguilar |
| 3 | Terrence Romeo |
| 2 | Jeff Chan |
| 2 | Jayjay Helterbrand |
| 2 | Benjie Paras |
| 2 | Arwind Santos |
| 2 | Asi Taulava |
| 2 | Matthew Wright |
