= List of 2017–18 PBA season transactions =

This is a list of transactions that have taken place during the off-season and the 2017–18 PBA season.

== Executive Board ==
Position	Outgoing	Incoming	Ref.
PBA Chairman	Michael Romero (GlobalPort)	Victorico Vargas (TNT)	
PBA Vice-Chairman	Ramoncito Fernandez (NLEX)	Richard Bachmann (Alaska)	

== List of transactions ==
=== Retirement ===
Date	Name	Team(s) played (years)	Age	Notes	Ref.
September 20	Anthony "Tony" Dela Cruz	Shell Turbo Chargers (1999-2005); Alaska Aces (2005-2017)	39	3x PBA Champion (2007 Fiesta, 2010 Fiesta, 2013 Commissioner's); 1x Mythical 2nd Team (2005); 1x PBA Sportsmanship awardee (2006); 4x PBA All Star (2004-2007); 1x PBA Shooting Stars Champion (2006)	
October 30	Anthony "Jayjay" Helterbrand	Barangay Ginebra Kings/Barangay Ginebra San Miguel (2000-2017)	41	6x PBA Champion (2004 Fiesta, 2004-05 Philippine Cup, 2006-07 Philippine Cup, 2008 Fiesta, 2016 Governors' Cup, 2017 Governors' Cup); 1x PBA Most Valuable Player (2009); 1x PBA Finals MVP (2006–07 Philippine); 2× PBA Best Player of the Conference (2008 Fiesta, 2009 Fiesta); 7× PBA All-Star (2004–2010); 2× PBA All-Star Game MVP (2005, 2007); 2× PBA Mythical First Team (2008, 2009); 1x PBA Mr. Quality Minutes (2003); 1x PBA Comeback Player of the Year (2005); Brunei Sultan Cup Most Valuable Player (2005)	

== Coaching changes ==
=== Offseason ===
Departure date	Team	Outgoing head coach	Reason for departure	Hire date	Incoming head coach	Last coaching position	Ref.
Preseason	Phoenix	Ariel Vanguardia	Resigned	October 26	Louie Alas	Assistant coach (Alaska)	
Preseason	GlobalPort	Franz Pumaren	On Leave	October 29	Pido Jarencio	Head of basketball operations (GlobalPort)	
Preseason	Kia	Manny Pacquiao	End of Contract	November 4	Chris Gavina	Assistant coach (Kia)	
Philippine Cup	Kia	Chris Gavina	Resigned	December 30	Ricky Dandan	Assistant coach (Kia)	

== Player movements ==
=== Trades ===
==== Pre-season ====
October
October 27, 2017	To San Miguel 2017 PBA first round pick (Christian Standhardinger)	To Kia Ronald Tubid; Jay-R Reyes; Rashawn McCarthy; 2019 first round pick
November
November 3, 2017	To GlobalPort Joseph Gabayni; Lervin Flores; Julian Sargent	To Magnolia Robert Herndon; Gian Abrigo
November 6, 2017	To NLEX Michael Miranda	To Phoenix 2018 2nd round pick (from TNT)
November 15, 2017	To Kia Jason Grimaldo; 2018 2nd round pick (from TNT)	To Phoenix LA Revilla
November 28, 2017	To TNT Sidney Onwubere	To Phoenix Justin Chua; Jon Jon Gabriel
December
December 5, 2017	To Kia Jon Jon Gabriel	To Phoenix 2021 2nd round pick
December 15, 2017	To Alaska 2019 2nd round pick	To Phoenix Jaypee Mendoza

==== All-Filipino ====
February
February 15, 2018	To Rain or Shine Kris Rosales; Sidney Onwubere; 2018 PBA first round pick	To TNT Jericho Cruz
March
March 26, 2018	To Rain or Shine Norbert Torres	To TNT Don Trollano
April
April 3, 2018	To GlobalPort Mo Tautuaa; 2020 1st round pick 2021 2nd round pick	To TNT Terrence Romeo; Yousef Taha

==== Commissioner's Cup ====
June
June 18, 2018	To Ginebra Jeff Chan	To Phoenix 2018 first round pick
June 19, 2018	To Ginebra Julian Sargent	To GlobalPort Paolo Taha
June 21, 2018	To San Miguel Kelly Nabong	To GlobalPort Gabby Espinas; 2020 second round pick

==== Governors' Cup ====
August
August 7, 2018	To Phoenix Calvin Abueva	To Alaska Karl Dehesa; 2019 first round pick

=== Free agency ===
==== Additions ====
- Nico Elorde – Globalport Batang Pier
- Jason Ballesteros – Meralco Bolts
- Mac Baracael – Meralco Bolts
- Niño Canaleta – Meralco Bolts
- Dylan Ababou – Kia Picanto
- Kyle Pascual – Magnolia Hotshots Pambansang Manok
- Chico Lanete – San Miguel Beermen
- Billy Mamaril – San Miguel Beermen
- Carlo Lastimosa – Kia Picanto
- Prince Caperal – Barangay Ginebra San Miguel
- Jeric Teng – GlobalPort Batang Pier

=== Released ===
==== Waived ====
- Rico Maierhofer – GlobalPort Batang Pier (signed with Tanduay Alab Pilipinas)
- Jason Deutchman – Kia Picanto
- Josan Nimes – Kia Picanto
- Michael Mabulac – San Miguel Beermen (signed with Laguna Heroes (MPBL)

=== Rookie signings ===
- Christian Standhardinger (San Miguel) – 3 years / 8.55 million
- Kiefer Ravena (NLEX) – 3 years / 8.55 million
- Jeron Teng (Alaska) – 3 years / 8.55 million
- Jason Perkins (Phoenix) – 3 years / 8.55 million
