= 2011 PBA All-Star Weekend =

South All-Stars	North All-Stars
129	133
	1	2	3	4	Total
South All-Stars	31	40	34	24	129
North All-Stars	41	29	33	30	133
- Date: May 18–23, 2011
- Venue: Boracay Convention Center, Boracay, Aklan
- MVP: Marc Pingris (B-Meg Derby Ace Llamados)
- Network: Solar Sports (Studio 23); Basketball TV

The 2011 PBA All-Star Weekend was the annual all-star weekend of the Philippine Basketball Association (PBA)'s 2010–11 PBA season. The events were held from May 18 to 23, 2011 at the Boracay Convention Center, Boracay, Aklan.

== Friday events ==
=== Coca-Cola Obstacle Challenges ===
Time in seconds.

Name	First round	Championship
Jonas Villanueva	29.3	29.1
Ronjay Buenafe	29.7	32.1
Chris Ross	28.0	33.5
LA Tenorio	30.1	
Willie Miller	31.7	
Alex Cabagnot	32.2	
Sean Anthony (Note: Sean Anthony of Powerade Tigers replaced his teammate Gary David due to absent.)	40.1	
Josh Urbiztondo	43.4	
Jimmy Alapag	43.7	

- Gold color represent the current champion.

=== Maynilad Three-point Shootout ===
Name	First round	Championship
Mark Macapagal	12	17
Ronald Tubid	14	16
Jimmy Alapag	13	15
Sunday Salvacion	11	
Mark Cardona	10	
Dondon Hontiveros	9	
Ronjay Buenafe	9	
Joe Devance	7	
James Yap	7	

- Gold color represent the current champion.

=== Meralco High-Voltage Slamdunk Contest ===
Name	First round	Second round	Championship
Kelly Williams	49	50	92
Rey Guevarra	49	46	84
JC Intal	42	50	
Ronald Tubid	41	48	
Elmer Espiritu	36	45	
Josh Vanlandingham (Note: Josh Vanlandingham of Rain or Shine Elasto Painters replaced his teammate Gabe Norwood due to injury.)	41	36	
Jay Washington			

- Jay Washington attended in Boracay, but did not compete in the slamdunk competition.
- Slamdunk champion Niño Canaleta won't join this year's slamdunk competition.

=== Rookie-Sophomore Blitz Game ===
==== Rosters ====
Rookies:

- Rey Guevarra (Petron Blaze Boosters)
- Elmer Espiritu (Air21 Express)
- Robert Labagala (Barangay Ginebra Kings)
- Hans Thiele (Alaska Aces)
- Josh Vanlandingham (Rain or Shine Elasto Painters)
- Shawn Weinstein (Meralco Bolts)
- John Wilson (Barangay Ginebra Kings)
- Sean Anthony (Powerade Tigers)
- Coach: Joshua Reyes (Talk 'N Text Tropang Texters)

Sophomores:

- Josh Urbiztondo (Air21 Express)
- Chris Ross (Meralco Bolts)
- Jervy Cruz (Rain or Shine Elasto Painters)
- Jerwin Gaco (B-Meg Derby Ace Llamados)
- Emerson Oreta* (Talk 'N Text Tropang Texters)
- Larry Rodriguez* (Rain or Shine Elasto Painters)
- Coach: Gee Abanilla (Petron Blaze Boosters)

- Third year pro Emerson Oreta and Larry Rodriguez were named to augment the Sophomores team replacing the injured Rico Maierhofer, Francis Allera and Marcy Arellano.

=== Game ===
Solar

May 20

Report

Rookies 114, Sophomores 106
Scoring by quarter: 27–23, 30–27, 35–34, 32–32
Pts: Labagala 25, Vanlandingham 17, Espiritu 16, Thiele 15, Wilson 14, Anthony 12, Guevarra 9, Weinstein 6	Pts: Rodriguez 27, Cruz 21, Gaco 19, Urbiztondo 15, Ross 14, Oreta 13
Robert Labagala and Sean Anthony were named the game's co-most valuable players.

Boracay Convention Center, Boracay, Aklan

- In the game, there were four 10-minute quarters, the 8-second rule was lessened into 6 seconds, the shot clock was cut into 18 seconds, and a slam dunk counted for three points.

== Sunday events ==
=== Legends shootout ===
Active players	Score		Legends
Mark Macapagal	13	10	Alvin Patrimonio
Ronald Tubid	18	9	Ato Agustin
Jimmy Alapag	12	12	Allan Caidic
Total	43	31	Total

- Top 3 finalist in the three-point shootout will battle against the three shootout legend.

=== All-Star Game ===
==== Rosters ====
North All-Stars:

Starters

- Marc Pingris (B-Meg Derby Ace Llamados)
- Kerby Raymundo (B-Meg Derby Ace Llamados)
- LA Tenorio (Alaska Aces) (Note: LA Tenorio replace Mark Caguioa in the starting lineup due to his family problems back in the U.S.)
- Willie Miller (Barangay Ginebra Kings)
- Gabe Norwood (Rain or Shine Elasto Painters)

Reserves

- Rabeh Al-Hussaini (Petron Blaze Boosters)
- Arwind Santos (Petron Blaze Boosters)
- Alex Cabagnot (Petron Blaze Boosters)
- Ranidel de Ocampo (Talk 'N Text Tropang Texters)
- Harvey Carey (Talk 'N Text Tropang Texters)
- Mark Cardona (Meralco Bolts)
- JC Intal (Barangay Ginebra Kings) (Note: JC Intal was added to the lineup after the absence of his teammate Mark Caguioa.)
- Coach:Ato Agustin (San Miguel Beermen)

South All-Stars:

Starters

- James Yap (B-Meg Derby Ace Llamados)
- Jay Washington (Petron Blaze Boosters)
- Kelly Williams (Talk 'N Text Tropang Texters)
- Eric Menk (Barangay Ginebra Kings)
- Cyrus Baguio (Alaska Aces)

Reserves

- Jimmy Alapag (Talk 'N Text Tropang Texters)
- Peter June Simon (B-Meg Derby Ace Llamados)
- Asi Taulava (Meralco Bolts)
- Dondon Hontiveros (Air21 Express)
- Danny Seigle (Air21 Express)
- Joe Devance (Alaska Aces)
- Sonny Thoss (Alaska Aces)
- Coach:Chot Reyes (Talk 'N Text Tropang Texters)

=== Game ===
Solar

May 22
6:30 p.m.

North All-Stars 133, South All-Stars 129
Scoring by quarter: 41–31, 29–40, 33–34, 30–24
Pts: Pingris 24, Santos 21, Raymundo 19, Miller 16, Al-Hussaini 11, Tenorio 10, Carey 8, Cardona 8, Norwood 6, Intal 4, Cabagnot 4, de Ocampo 2	Pts: Hontiveros 19, Yap 15, Washington 15, Taulava 15, Devance 14, Alapag 14, Seigle 12, Simon 12, Baguio 6, Thoss 3, Williams 2, Menk 2

Boracay Convention Center, Boracay, Aklan

- Marc Pingris was named the game's most valuable player.

== See also ==
- 2010–11 PBA season
- Philippine Basketball Association
- Philippine Basketball Association All-Star Weekend

Preceded by 2010	PBA All-Star Weekend; 2011	Succeeded by 2012
