= 2001 PBA All-Star Weekend =

2001 PBA All-Star Game
Veterans	Rookies-Sophomores-Juniors
112	105
- Date: July 22, 2001
- Venue: Araneta Coliseum, Quezon City
- Network: PBA on Viva TV

The 2001 PBA All-Star Game is the annual All-Star Weekend of the Philippine Basketball Association (PBA). The All-Star game was held on July 22, 2001 at the Araneta Coliseum in Quezon City.

== Skills Challenge winners ==
Slam Dunk Competition: San Miguel's Joey Mente won the slam dunk title, Mente soared over Olsen Racela's bowed head to deliver the winning slam and the only perfect score of the night as he beat Alaska's John Arigo.

Buzzer-beating competition winner: Jayjay Helterbrand of Barangay Ginebra, over Olsen Racela, Jason Webb and Patrick Fran.

Three-Point Shootout winner: Boyet Fernandez of Purefoods.

Two-Ball Competition: Barangay Ginebra's Jun Limpot and Bal David defeated Mobiline's Victor Pablo and Gherome Ejercito, 63-53, to capture the two-ball competition.

== All-Star Game ==
=== Rosters ===
Veterans:

- Johnny Abarrientos (Pop Cola)
- Jeffrey Cariaso (Tanduay)
- Noy Castillo (Purefoods)
- Kenneth Duremdes (Alaska)
- Dennis Espino (Sta.Lucia)
- Danny Ildefonso (San Miguel)
- Chris Jackson (Shell)
- Poch Juinio (Pop Cola)
- Jun Limpot (Ginebra)
- Alvin Patrimonio (Purefoods)
- Ali Peek (Alaska)
- Olsen Racela (San Miguel)
- Coach: Jong Uichico (San Miguel)

Rookies-Sophomores-Juniors:

- Don Allado (Alaska)
- John Arigo (Alaska)
- Mark Caguioa (Ginebra)
- Gherome Ejercito (Mobiline)
- Davonn Harp (Red Bull)
- Rudy Hatfield (Pop Cola)
- Jayjay Helterbrand (Ginebra)
- Dondon Hontiveros (Tanduay)
- Ronald Magtulis (Ginebra)
- Kerby Raymundo (Red Bull)
- Danny Seigle (San Miguel)
- Asi Taulava (Mobiline)
- Coach: Allan Caidic (Ginebra)

=== Game ===
Viva TV

July 22

Veterans 112, Rookies-Sophomores-Juniors 105

Araneta Coliseum, Quezon City

The Veterans turned back RSJ, 112-105, behind some endgame heroics from Poch Juinio and Kenneth Duremdes after the RSJ's close the gap at 102-105 with two minutes left. Danny Ildefonso, who scored 21 points, sparked the Veterans' breakaway with a slam from a perfect fastbreak pitch by Olsen Racela that gave them a 72-59 lead. Veterans Won defeat RSJ and Danny Ildefonso named on his All Star Game Most Valuable Player Award.

Preceded by 2000	PBA All-Star Weekend; 2001	Succeeded by 2003
