= 2008 PBA All-Star Weekend =

North All-Stars	South All-Stars
158	163
	1	2	3	4	OT	Total
North All-Stars	41	37	36	35	9	158
South All-Stars	41	38	34	34	14	161
- Date: April 24–27, 2008
- Venue: West Negros University Gym, Bacolod, Negros Occidental
- MVP: Peter June Simon
- Attendance: 4000
- Network: Associated Broadcasting Company (ABC)

The 2008 PBA All-Star Weekend was the annual all-star weekend of the Philippine Basketball Association (PBA)'s 2007–08 PBA season. The events were held from April 24 to 27, 2008 at the West Negros University Gym, Bacolod, Negros Occidental.

== Friday events ==
=== Obstacle Challenge ===
Time in seconds.

Name	First round	Championship
Marvin Cruz	32.8	
Willie Miller	32.0	25.5
Dondon Hontiveros	31.7	35.6
Ronjay Buenafe	32.0	41.7
Ronald Tubid	32.6	
Chico Lanete	39.7	
Topex Robinson	32.2	
Ryan Reyes	33.0	
Jimmy Alapag	36.4	
Joey Mente	37.7	

Willie Miller wins for the third straight year, with the fastest time in the event's history.

=== Three-point shootout ===
Name	First round	Championship
Renren Ritualo	17	19
John Arigo	20	17
Dondon Hontiveros	18	18
Willie Miller	16	
Mike Hrabak	15	
James Yap	14	
Niño Canaleta	13	
Joe Devance	12	
Junthy Valenzuela	12	
Nelbert Omolon	10	

=== Slam Dunk competition ===
Name	Score	Type
Kelly Williams	98	
Ronald Tubid	88	
Arwind Santos	86	

Failed to qualify: Reynel Hugnatan, Ronald Tubid, Joey Mente

=== Rookie-Sophomore Blitz Game ===
==== Rosters ====
Rookies:

- Yousif Aljamal (Talk 'N Text)
- Ken Bono (Magnolia)
- Ronjay Buenafe (Coca-Cola)
- Marvin Cruz (Air21)
- Joe Devance (Welcoat)
- Samigue Eman (Magnolia)
- Doug Kramer (Air21)
- Chico Lanete (Purefoods)
- Coach: Cholo Martin (Sta. Lucia)

Sophomores:

- Mark Andaya (Red Bull)
- Junjun Cabatu (Alaska)
- Jireh Ibañes (Welcoat)
- Mark Isip (Welcoat)
- Magnum Membrere (Red Bull)
- Chris Pacana (Brgy. Ginebra)
- Jay-R Reyes (Welcoat)
- LA Tenorio (Alaska)
- Coach: Koy Banal (Purefoods)

==== Game ====
ABC

April 25

Rookies 101, Sophomores 97
Scoring by quarter: 20–27, 26–27, 31–21, 24–22
Pts: Buenafe 25, Lanete 17, Cruz 14, Devance 14, Bono 10, Aljamal 8, Kramer 7, Eman 6.	Pts: Tenorio 19, Pacana 14, Reyes 13, Ibañes 12, Andaya 12, Membrere 11, Cabatu 10, Isip 6.
Ronjay Buenafe was named the game's most valuable player.

West Negros University Gym, Bacolod
Attendance: 4,000

In the game, there were four 10-minute quarters, the 8-second rule was lessened into 6 seconds, the shot clock was cut into 18 seconds, and a slam dunk was counted for three points.

== Sunday events ==
=== Legends Shootout ===
Active players	Score		Legends
John Arigo	18	17	Boyet Fernandez
Dondon Hontiveros	18	15	Roehl Gomez
Renren Ritualo	13	13	Boy Cabahug
Total	49	45	Total

=== All-Star Game ===
==== Rosters ====
North All-Stars:

- Mark Caguioa (Brgy. Ginebra)
- Jayjay Helterbrand (Brgy. Ginebra)
- Marc Pingris (Magnolia)
- Lordy Tugade (Magnolia)
- Kerby Raymundo (Purefoods)
- Nic Belasco (Coca-Cola)
- Mark Cardona (Talk 'N Text)
- Ranidel de Ocampo (Air21)
- Willie Miller (Alaska)
- Arwind Santos (Air21)
- Enrico Villanueva (Purefoods)
- Ryan Reyes (Sta. Lucia)
- Coach: Ryan Gregorio (Purefoods)

South All-Stars:

- Asi Taulava (Coca-Cola)
- Jimmy Alapag (Talk 'N Text)
- Cyrus Baguio (Red Bull)
- John Ferriols (Alaska)
- Dondon Hontiveros (Magnolia)
- Reynel Hugnatan (Alaska)
- Peter June Simon (Purefoods)
- Sonny Thoss (Alaska)
- Junthy Valenzuela (Brgy. Ginebra)
- Kelly Williams (Sta. Lucia)
- James Yap (Purefoods)
- Reynel Hugnatan (Alaska)
- Coach: Boyet Fernandez (Sta. Lucia)

==== Game ====
ABC

April 27
6:30 p.m.

North All-Stars 158, South All-Stars 163 (OT)
Scoring by quarter: 41–41, 37–38, 36–34, 35–36, Overtime: 9–14
Pts: Mark Caguioa 24	Pts: Peter June Simon 29
Peter June Simon named the game's most valuable player.

West Negros University Gym, Bacolod
Attendance: 4,000
