= 2006 PBA All-Star Weekend =

2006 PBA All-Star Game
South	North
122	120
	1	2	3	4	Total
South	33	33	30	26	122
North	31	32	31	26	120
- Date: April 28–29, 2006
- Venue: Xavier University Gym, Cagayan de Oro
- MVP: Asi Taulava (Talk 'N Text Phone Pals)
- Network: Associated Broadcasting Company (ABC)

The 2006 Hope-PBA All-Star Weekend was the annual all-star weekend of the Philippine Basketball Association (PBA)'s 2005–06 PBA season. This was the second all-star weekend held in the season, due to the league adjusting its season calendar.

== Background ==
This was the first All-Star Weekend to be held in Mindanao, and the third straight All-Star weekend to be held outside Metro Manila since 2004. Cagayan De Oro won the hosting rights over Iloilo. This made Misamis Oriental the fourth province to host an All-Star weekend.

For the first time, cash prizes were awarded to winners of the side events during All-Star weekend. The shooting stars event was also introduced in which an active player, a celebrity, and a local government official competed together as a team.

== All-Star Weekend ==
The winners in this edition of the All-Star Weekend are as follows:

- (A) Sophomores over the Rookies, 133–123, with Nelbert Omolon emerging as MVP.
- (B) Willie Miller in the Obstacle and Trick Shot Challenges.
- (C) William Antonio in the 3-point shootout.
- (D) Niño Canaleta in the Slam Dunk competition.
- (E) The team of Tony dela Cruz, Chot Reyes and Cagayan de Oro City Mayor Yevgeny Emano in the shooting stars event.
- (F) The team of Jojo Lastimosa, Ricardo Marata and Boybits Victoria in the Legends Shootout.

== Main All-Star Game ==
=== Coaches ===
San Miguel Beermen coach Jong Uichico qualified for the South while Binky Favis of the Coca-Cola Tigers made his first All-Star coaching stint for the North. The two were chosen as coaches after the Beermen and Tigers emerged as the two squads with the best record after the cutoff period of the 2006 Philippine Cup classification phase for the All-Star weekend.

=== Rosters ===
This year's All-Star game marked the first time fans from the host city were involved in voting a player for both teams. PBA head coaches then voted for the reserves but were not allowed to choose players from their own team.

Talk 'N Text Phone Pals teammates Jimmy Alapag and Asi Taulava along with James Yap, Danny Seigle, and Eric Menk were announced as the starters for the South All-Stars, while the Barangay Ginebra trio of Mark Caguioa, Rommel Adducul, and Jayjay Helterbrand led the North All-Stars' starting five that also included Danny Ildefonso and Enrico Villanueva. As the host city, Cagayan de Oro selected Roger Yap and Kerby Raymundo for the South and North teams respectively. Coming off the bench for the North were Ali Peek, Olsen Racela, Nic Belasco, John Arigo, Renren Ritualo and Willie Miller while the South reserves were Dorian Peña, Dondon Hontiveros, Cyrus Baguio, Rafi Reavis, Reynel Hugnatan and Noy Castillo.

North All-Stars:

- Rommel Adducul (Barangay Ginebra) *Did not show up
- John Arigo (Coca-Cola)
- Nic Belasco (Alaska)
- Mark Caguioa (Barangay Ginebra) *Did not show up
- Jayjay Helterbrand (Barangay Ginebra)
- Danny Ildefonso (San Miguel)
- Willie Miller (Alaska)
- Ali Peek (Coca-Cola)
- Olsen Racela (San Miguel)
- Kerby Raymundo (Purefoods)
- Renren Ritualo (Air21)
- Enrico Villanueva (Red Bull)
- Coach: Binky Favis (Coca-Cola)

South All-Stars:

- Jimmy Alapag (Talk 'N Text)
- Cyrus Baguio (Red Bull)
- Noy Castillo (Purefoods) *Did not show up
- Dondon Hontiveros (San Miguel)
- Reynel Hugnatan (Alaska)
- Eric Menk (Barangay Ginebra)
- Dorian Peña (San Miguel)
- Rafi Reavis (Coca-Cola)
- Danny Seigle (San Miguel)
- Asi Taulava (Talk 'N Text)
- James Yap (Purefoods)
- Roger Yap (Purefoods)
- Coach: Jong Uichico (San Miguel)

=== Game ===
ABC

April 29

South All-Stars 122, North All-Stars 120
Scoring by quarter: 33–31, 33–32, 30–31, 26–26
Pts: Asi Taulava 30	Pts: Danny Ildefonso 26
Asi Taulava was named the game's most valuable player.

Xavier University Gym, Cagayan de Oro

Preceded by 2005	PBA All-Star Weekend; 2006	Succeeded by 2007
