= 2012 PBA All-Star Weekend =

Rookies-Sophomores-Juniors	Veterans
144	176
	1	2	3	4	Total
Rookies-Sophomores-Juniors	31	33	41	39	144
Veterans	53	42	37	44	176
- Date: May 10–13, 2012
- Venue: Ilocos Norte Centennial Arena, Laoag, Ilocos Norte
- MVP: James Yap (B-Meg Llamados)
- Network: AKTV on IBC

The 2012 PBA All-Star Weekend was the annual all-star weekend of the Philippine Basketball Association (PBA)'s 2011–12 PBA season. The events were held from May 10 to 13, 2012 at the Ilocos Norte Centennial Arena, Laoag, Ilocos Norte.

Highlighting the weekend was the return of the Rookies-Sophomores-Juniors (RSJ) vs. Veterans format of the All-Star game, after being dropped following the 2001 event.

Mark Macapagal and Jonas Villanueva achieved three-peats as they were again victorious in the Three-point Shootout and Obstacle Challenge, respectively.

The players from Talk 'N Text Tropang Texters were pulled out from their respective events, days before the start of the weekend.

== Friday events ==
=== Obstacle Challenges ===
Time in seconds.

Name	Team	First round	Championship
Jonas Villanueva	B-Meg	29.7	31.1
Paul Lee	Rain or Shine	27.2	31.3
LA Tenorio	Alaska	30.0	43.0
Willie Miller	Barako	30.1	
Alex Cabagnot	Petron	32.2	
Robert Labagala	Ginebra	33.8	
Jojo Duncil	Air21	36.3	
JVee Casio	Powerade	36.5	
Chris Ross	Meralco	37.6	

- Gold represents the current champion.
- Jonas Villanueva won his three-peat for the Obstacle Challenge.

=== Three-point Shootout ===
Name	Team	First round	Championship
Mark Macapagal	Meralco	16	15
Niño Canaleta	Ginebra	19	13
Josh Urbiztondo	B-Meg	16	13
Marcio Lassiter	Petron	16	7
Renren Ritualo	Air21	15	
Jeffrei Chan	Rain or Shine	15	
Gary David	Powerade	14	
Willie Miller	Barako	13	
Cyrus Baguio	Alaska	6	

- Mark Macapagal won his three-peat for the Three-point Shootout.

=== Greats vs. Stalwarts ===
Team Greats vs. Team Stalwarts will be the newest event for the All-Star Weekend. Team Greats and Team Stalwart will play with 4 PBA Legends each.

==== Rosters ====
Team Stalwarts:

- Asi Taulava (Meralco)
- Sean Anthony (Powerade)
- Peter June Simon (B-Meg)
- Mark Cardona (Meralco)
- Cyrus Baguio (Alaska)
- Jeffrei Chan (Rain or Shine)
- Allan Caidic (Legends)
- Leo Isaac (Legends)
- Kenneth Duremdes (Legends)
- Johnny Abarrientos (Legends)
- Playing coach: Allan Caidic

Team Greats:

- Danny Ildefonso (Petron)
- Nino Canaleta (Ginebra)
- Danny Seigle (Barako)
- Joseph Yeo (Petron)
- Mike Cortez (Ginebra)
- Sol Mercado (Meralco)
- Willie Miller (Barako)
- Alvin Patrimonio (Legends)
- Ato Agustin (Legends)
- Jojo Lastimosa (Legends)
- Olsen Racela (Legends)
- Playing coach: Ato Agustin

==== Game ====
AKTV on IBC

May 11

Report

Team Greats 143, Team Stalwarts 139
Scoring by quarter: 33–29, 41–46, 30–37, 39–27
Pts: Miller 29, Canaleta 21, Seigle 20, Mercado 19, Agustin 19, Cortez 10, Yeo 8, Lastimosa 7, Racela 6, Patrimonio 4	Pts: Duremdes 29, Chan 18, Cardona 17, Taulava 16, Caidic 15, Simon 14, Baguio 11, Abarrientos 10, Isaac 0
Ato Agustin was named the game's most valuable player.

Ilocos Norte Centennial Arena, Laoag, Ilocos Norte

== Sunday events ==
=== Slamdunk Contest ===
Name	Team	First round	Second round	Championship
Niño Canaleta	Ginebra	50	40	100
JC Intal	B-Meg	44	46	99
Gabe Norwood	Rain or Shine	50	50	93
Arwind Santos	Petron	46	42	
Elmer Espiritu	Air21	41	35	

- Defending champion Kelly Williams together with teammate Japeth Aguilar didn't attend the All-star weekend due to their team management's decision.

=== RSJs vs. Veterans ===
==== Rosters ====
Rookies-Sophomores-Juniors
Pos	Player	Team	No. of selections	Votes
Starters
G	JVee Casio	Powerade Tigers	1	45,038
G	Paul Lee	Rain or Shine Elasto Painters	1	39,777
F	Dylan Ababou	Barangay Ginebra Kings	1	38,621
F/G	Josh Urbiztondo	B-Meg Llamados	1	39,963
F	Marcio Lassiter	Petron Blaze Boosters	1	43,067
Reserves
F/C	Rabeh Al-Hussaini	Powerade Tigers	2	—
F	Mac Baracael	Alaska Aces	1	—
F	Rico Maierhofer	Barangay Ginebra Kings	2	—
G	Mark Barroca	B-Meg Llamados	1	—
G	Chris Ross	Meralco Bolts	1	—
Head coach: Bo Perasol (Powerade Tigers)

Veterans
Pos	Player	Team	No. of selections	Votes
Starters
G	James Yap	B-Meg Llamados	9	37,893
G	JC Intal	B-Meg Llamados	3	29,503
F	Gary David	Powerade Tigers	3	—
C	Marc Pingris	B-Meg Llamados	6	41,192
F	Arwind Santos	Petron Blaze Boosters	5	42,996
Reserves
F	Gabe Norwood	Rain or Shine Elasto Painters	4	—
G	LA Tenorio	Alaska Aces	3	—
G	Alex Cabagnot	Petron Blaze Boosters	2	—
C	Sonny Thoss	Alaska Aces	9	—
C	Asi Taulava	Meralco Bolts	11	—
G	Sol Mercado	Meralco Bolts	2	—
Head coach: Ryan Gregorio (Meralco Bolts)

- Asi Taulava of Meralco replaced Ranidel de Ocampo in the line-up because the entire Talk 'N Text team chose not to participate at the All-star Weekend.
- Chot Reyes was replaced by Ryan Gregorio as Veterans coach because the entire Talk 'N Text team chose not to participate at the All-star Weekend.
- Mark Caguioa of Team Veterans did not play because of an eye injury.

==== Game ====
AKTV on IBC

May 13

Report

Veterans 176, Rookies-Sophomores-Juniors 144
Scoring by quarter: 53–31, 42–33, 37–41, 44–39
Pts: Yap 44, Santos 31, Intal 18, Cabagnot 16, David 16, Mercado 14, Tenorio 13, Norwood 13, Taulava 6, Thoss 5, Pingris 0	Pts: Ababou 44, Urbiztondo 21, Casio 18, Maierhofer 12, Baracael 11, Barroca 10, Al-Hussaini 9, Ross 8, Lee 8, Lassiter 3

Ilocos Norte Centennial Arena, Laoag, Ilocos Norte

- James Yap was named the game's most valuable player.

== See also ==
- 2011–12 PBA season
- Philippine Basketball Association
- Philippine Basketball Association All-Star Weekend

Preceded by 2011	PBA All-Star Weekend; 2012	Succeeded by 2013
