= 2013 PBA All-Star Weekend =

Annual basketball event

Gilas Pilipinas	PBA All-Stars
124	124
	1	2	3	4	Total
Gilas Pilipinas	33	33	23	35	124
PBA All-Stars	31	34	30	29	124
- Date: May 3–5, 2013
- Venue: Davao del Sur Coliseum, Digos
- MVP: Arwind Santos and Jeff Chan (Co-MVPs)
- Network: AKTV on IBC

The 2013 PBA All-Star Weekend was the annual all-star weekend of the Philippine Basketball Association (PBA)'s 2012–13 PBA season. The events were held from May 1 to 6, 2013 at the Davao del Sur Coliseum, Digos.

Highlighting the weekend was the Gilas Pilipinas vs. PBA All-Stars game, which was held at the final day of the weekend. The All-Star game format was adapted to prepare the national team for the upcoming 2013 FIBA Asia Championship, which was similarly done in 2009.

== Friday events ==
=== Obstacle Challenges ===
Time in seconds.

Name	Team	First round	Championship
Jonas Villanueva	Barako Bull	27.2	26.3
Chris Ellis	Ginebra	28.9	28.1
John Raymundo	Talk 'N Text	32.8	30.3
Cliff Hodge	Meralco	35.1	
JVee Casio	Alaska	35.6	
Mark Barroca	San Mig Coffee	36.7	
Simon Atkins	Air21	38.6 (Note: Due to a technical error, he was allowed to repeat the challenge. His first performance was registered at 39.6 seconds.)	
Willie Miller	GlobalPort	38.9	
Paul Lee	Rain or Shine	39.3	
Ronald Tubid	Petron	60	

- Gold represents the current champion.
- Jonas Villanueva won his four-peat for the Obstacle Challenge.

=== Three-point Shootout ===
Name	Team	First round	Championship
Chris Tiu	Rain or Shine	17	21
Niño Canaleta	Air21	13	18
JVee Casio	Alaska	15	13
Marcio Lassiter	Petron Blaze	11	
Mark Macapagal	Barako Bull	11	
Willie Miller	GlobalPort	11	
Josh Urbiztondo	Barangay Ginebra	11	
James Yap	San Mig Coffee	8	

- Gold represents the current champion.

=== Slamdunk Contest ===
Name	Team	First round	Second round	Championship
Chris Ellis	Ginebra	50	50	93
Elmer Espiritu	Ginebra	44	47	70
Calvin Abueva	Alaska	50	38	
Arwind Santos	Petron	45	43	
Cliff Hodge	Meralco	38	50	

=== Greats vs. Stalwarts Game ===
==== Rosters ====
Team Greats:

- Peter June Simon (San Mig Coffee)
- Joe Devance (San Mig Coffee)
- Mark Barroca (San Mig Coffee)
- Paul Lee (Rain or Shine)
- Mike Cortez (Air21)
- Cliff Hodge (Meralco)
- Noli Locsin (Legends)
- Johnedel Cardel (Legends)
- Rodney Santos (Legends)
- Vince Hizon (Legends)
- Bong Hawkins (Legends)
- Playing coach: Jerry Codiñera (Legends)

Team Stalwarts:

- Mark Macapagal (Meralco)
- Ronald Tubid (Petron Blaze)
- JC Intal (Barako Bull)
- Chris Tiu (Rain or Shine)
- Jervy Cruz (Rain or Shine)
- Willie Miller (GlobalPort)
- Dickie Bachmann (Legends)
- Bong Ravena (Legends)
- Topex Robinson (Legends)
- Playing coach: Kenneth Duremdes (Legends)

- Paul Lee, Cliff Hodge and Mark Barroca replaced Danny Seigle, Mark Cardona and Dondon Hontiveros for the Team Greats.
- Ronjay Buenafe, Glenn Capacio, Benjie Paras and Sol Mercado were replaced by Mark Macapagal, Bong Ravena, Kenneth Duremdes and Willie Miller for the Team Stalwarts.
- Art dela Cruz from Team Stalwarts and Josh Urbiztondo from Team Greats did not play in the game.

==== Game ====
AKTV on IBC

May 3

Boxscore

Team Greats 105, Team Stalwarts 112
Scoring by quarter: 21–35, 30–27, 37–22, 17–28
Pts: Simon 22, Devance 15, Santos 14, Codiñera 11, Lee 10, Barroca 10, Hizon 6, Cortez 6, Hawkins 5, Hodge 4, Locsin 2, Cardel 0	Pts: Duremdes 19, Macapagal 19, Tubid 18, Cruz 16, Miller 16, Intal 9, Robinson 6, Tiu 5, Bachmann 4, Ravena 0

Davao del Sur Coliseum, Digos

- The game was divided into four 10-minute quarters.
- Kenneth Duremdes was named the game's MVP.

== Sunday events ==
=== Shooting Stars Challenge ===
Team Name	Members	Time
Team Casio	JVee Casio	1:05
Team Casio	Paolo Anota	1:05
Team Casio	Rouel Paras	1:05
Team Santos	Arwind Santos	1:18
Team Santos	Robert Teo	1:18
Team Santos	Mark Montecillo	1:18
Team Belga	Beau Belga	1:41
Team Belga	Wendell Ramos	1:41
Team Belga	Felipe Lauayon	1:41
Team Canaleta	KG Canaleta	2:00
Team Canaleta	Akihiro Blanco	2:00
Team Canaleta	Jimmy Chin	2:00

=== Rosters ===
Gilas Pilipinas
Pos	Player	Team
Starters
G	Jayson Castro	Talk 'N Text Tropang Texters
G	Larry Fonacier	Talk 'N Text Tropang Texters
F	Ranidel de Ocampo	Talk 'N Text Tropang Texters
F	Gabe Norwood	Rain or Shine Elasto Painters
C	Sonny Thoss	Alaska Aces
Reserves
G	LA Tenorio	Barangay Ginebra San Miguel
G	Jeffrei Chan	Rain or Shine Elasto Painters
G	Gary David	GlobalPort Batang Pier
F	Marc Pingris	San Mig Coffee Mixers
F/C	Japeth Aguilar	Barangay Ginebra San Miguel
F/C	June Mar Fajardo	Petron Blaze Boosters
Head coach: Chot Reyes (National Team Coach)

PBA All-Stars
Pos	Player	Team	No. of selections	Votes
Starters
G	Mark Caguioa	Barangay Ginebra San Miguel	6	16,097
G	James Yap	San Mig Coffee Mixers	10	22,241
F	Calvin Abueva	Alaska Aces	1	20,227
F	Chris Ellis	Barangay Ginebra	1	12,596
C	Arwind Santos	Petron Blaze Boosters	6	18,557
Reserves
G	Alex Cabagnot	Petron Blaze Boosters	3	—
F	Marcio Lassiter	Petron Blaze Boosters	2	—
G	Cyrus Baguio	Alaska Aces	6	—
G	JVee Casio	Alaska Aces	2	—
C	Beau Belga	Rain or Shine Elasto Painters	1	—
F	Niño Canaleta	Air21 Express	1	—
Head coach: Luigi Trillo (Alaska Aces)

- Jay Washington of PBA All-Stars, and Jimmy Alapag, Ryan Reyes, Marcus Douthit and Greg Slaughter of Gilas Pilipinas did not play in the game.

=== Game ===
AKTV on IBC

May 5

Boxscore

Gilas Pilipinas 124, PBA All-Stars 124
Scoring by quarter: 33–31, 33–34, 23–30, 35–29
Pts: Fonacier 18, David 17, de Ocampo 14, Thoss 11, Castro 11, Tenorio 10, Norwood 10, Pingris 10, Fajardo 9, Chan 9, Aguilar 5	Pts: Santos 27, Canaleta 20, Belga 15, Cabagnot 15, Casio 9, Abueva 9, Baguio 9, Ellis 9, Lassiter 6, Caguioa 3, Yap 2

Davao del Sur Coliseum, Digos

- All-Star Game MVP: Arwind Santos (PBA) and Jeffrei Chan (Gilas) (co-winners)

== See also ==
- 2012–13 PBA season
- Philippine Basketball Association
- Philippine Basketball Association All-Star Weekend

Preceded by 2012	PBA All-Star Weekend; 2013	Succeeded by 2014
