= PBA All-Star Weekend =

Series of events hosted by the Philippine Basketball Association

- Status: Active
- Genre: Basketball exhibition
- Country: Philippines
- Inaugurated: 1990
- Organizer: Philippine Basketball Association

The Philippine Basketball Association All-Star Weekend is a series of events hosted by the Philippine Basketball Association (PBA). Held in the middle of the PBA season, usually before or during the second conference, it consists of a variety of basketball events, exhibitions, and performances culminating in the All-Star Game held on Sunday night. No regular games are held during this period, which is also known as the All-Star break. Since 2017, the All-Star festivities were extended for a week, instead of starting it on a Friday.

== Events ==
=== All-Star Game ===
The All-Star game, held on Sunday, is the main event of the weekend.

=== Shooting Stars Challenge ===
This event was introduced in 2006.

Year	Winners
2006	Tony dela Cruz (active player), Chot Reyes (celebrity), and Mayor Yevgeny Emano (government official)
2007	Jayjay Helterbrand (active player), Dominic Uy (sportscaster), and Councilor Panding Nince (government official)
2008	Ronald Tubid (active player), Jason Webb (sportscaster), and Councilor Greg Gasataya (government official)
2009–2011	None held
2012	Kenneth Duremdes (former player) and Jamie Farinas (fan)
2013	JVee Casio (current player), Paolo Anota (Radyo5), and Mayor Rouel Paras (government official)
2014–2015	None held
2016	Jericho Cruz (active player), Regina dela Merced (Women's PBA 3x3), Stacey Tibayan (Batang PBA), and Willie Bautista (Cignal TV)
2017	Glenn Khobuntin (active player), Mayor Emmanuel Mugot (government official), and Marcelo Balermo (fan)
2018	Team Emman Monfort
2019	Gabe Norwood (active player), Vijay Visandani (promoter), and JP Galvez (fan)
2020–2022	No event held due to COVID-19
2023	Jonas Terrado (sportswriter), Apple David (courtside reporter), Kobe Ordaniel (fan), and Senator Bong Go (government official)
2024	Justine Bacnis (sportswriter), Denise Tan (courtside reporter), Christoffer Elaija Octario (fan), and Councilor Al Victor Espino (government official)
2025	Cancelled
2026	Justine Bacnis (sportswriter), Adrian Nocum (active player), Jamie Lim (courtside reporter), Rexor Burgos (fan) and Councilor Michael Sarmento (government official)

=== Obstacle Challenge ===
From 1994 to 2002, the competition is known as the "Buzzer Beater contest".

Year	Winner
1994	Ato Agustin, San Miguel Beermen; Richie Ticzon, Coney Island Ice Cream Stars (co-champions)
1995	Matt Makalintal, San Miguel Beermen
1996	Jack Santiago, Sunkist Orange Bottlers
1997	Tonyboy Espinosa, Mobiline Cellulars
1998	Tonyboy Espinosa, Mobiline Phone Pals
1999	Bal David, Barangay Ginebra Kings; Rodney Santos, Alaska Milkmen (co-champions)
2000	Edward Naron, Barangay Ginebra Kings
2001	Jayjay Helterbrand, Barangay Ginebra Kings
2002	No event held
2003	Rob Johnson, Sta. Lucia Realtors
2004	Rob Johnson (2), Sta. Lucia Realtors
2005	Topex Robinson, Red Bull Barako
2006	Willie Miller, Talk 'N Text Phone Pals
2007	Willie Miller (2), Alaska Aces
2008	Willie Miller (3), Alaska Aces
2009	Paul Artadi, Barangay Ginebra Kings
2010	Jonas Villanueva, San Miguel Beermen
2011	Jonas Villanueva (2), B-Meg Llamados
2012	Jonas Villanueva (3), B-Meg Llamados
2013	Jonas Villanueva (4), Barako Bull Energy
2014	Mark Barroca, San Mig Super Coffee Mixers
2015	Jeric Fortuna, San Miguel Beermen
2016	Maverick Ahanmisi, Rain or Shine Elasto Painters
2017	Maverick Ahanmisi (2), Rain or Shine Elasto Painters
2018	Beau Belga, Rain or Shine Elasto Painters
2019	Beau Belga (2), Rain or Shine Elasto Painters
2020–2022	No event held due to COVID-19
2023	Dave Marcelo, TNT Tropang Giga
2024	JM Calma, NorthPort Batang Pier
2025	Cancelled
2026	Jerrick Ahanmisi, Terrafirma Dyip; Brandon Bates, Meralco Bolts

=== Three-Point Shootout ===
Year	Winner
1992	Allan Caidic, Presto Ice Cream Makers
1993	Elmer Cabahug, Coney Island Ice Cream Stars
1994	Ric-Ric Marata, Shell Rimula X
1995	Joey Guanio, Formula Shell Zoom Masters
1996	Ric-Ric Marata (2), Sunkist Orange Bottlers
1997	Rhoel Gomez, Alaska Milkmen
1998	Jasper Ocampo, Pop Cola 800s
1999	Jasper Ocampo (2), Pop Cola 800s
2000	Boyet Fernandez, Purefoods TJ Hotdogs
2001	Boyet Fernandez (2), Purefoods TJ Hotdogs
2002	No event held
2003	Jimmy Alapag, Talk 'N Text Phone Pals
2004	Ronald Tubid, Shell Turbo Chargers
2005	Jimmy Alapag (2), Talk 'N Text Phone Pals
2006	William Antonio, Coca-Cola Tigers
2007	Dondon Hontiveros, San Miguel Beermen
2008	Renren Ritualo, Talk 'N Text Phone Pals
2009	James Yap, Purefoods TJ Giants
2010	Mark Macapagal, Powerade Tigers
2011	Mark Macapagal (2), Powerade Tigers
2012	Mark Macapagal (3), Meralco Bolts
2013	Chris Tiu, Rain or Shine Elasto Painters
2014	Mark Macapagal (4), GlobalPort Batang Pier
2015	Terrence Romeo, GlobalPort Batang Pier
2016	Terrence Romeo (2), GlobalPort Batang Pier
2017	Allein Maliksi, Star Hotshots
2018	James Yap (2), Rain or Shine Elasto Painters
2019	Peter June Simon, Magnolia Hotshots
2020–2022	No event held due to COVID-19
2023	Paul Lee, Magnolia Hotshots
2024	Raymond Almazan, Meralco Bolts; Calvin Oftana, TNT Tropang Giga
2025	Cancelled
2026	Jerrick Ahanmisi, Terrafirma Dyip

=== Slam Dunk Contest ===
Year	Winner
1992	Vergel Meneses, Presto Ice Cream Makers
1993	Vergel Meneses (2), Swift Mighty Meaty Hotdogs
1994	Victor Pablo, Pepsi Hotshots
1995	Benjie Paras and Elmer Lago, Formula Shell Zoom Masters
1996	Marlou Aquino and Noli Locsin, Ginebra San Miguel
1997	Tyrone Hopkins* and Mike Orquillas, Gordon's Gin Boars
1998	No event held
1999	Rob Parker, Sta. Lucia Realtors
2000	Don Camaso, Mobiline Phone Pals
2001	Joey Mente, San Miguel Beermen
2002	No event held
2003	Brandon Cablay, Alaska Aces
2004	Cyrus Baguio, Red Bull Barako
2005	Niño Canaleta, Air21 Express
2006	Niño Canaleta (2), Air21 Express
2007	Niño Canaleta (3), Air21 Express
2008	Kelly Williams, Sta. Lucia Realtors
2009	David Noel*, Barangay Ginebra Kings
2010	Niño Canaleta (4), B-Meg Derby Ace Llamados
2011	Kelly Williams (2), Talk 'N Text Tropang Texters
2012	Niño Canaleta (5), Barangay Ginebra Kings
2013	Chris Ellis, Barangay Ginebra San Miguel
2014	Rey Guevarra, Meralco Bolts; Justin Melton, San Mig Super Coffee Mixers (co-champions)
2015	Rey Guevarra (2), Meralco Bolts
2016	Rey Guevarra (3), Meralco Bolts
2017	Chris Newsome, Meralco Bolts
2018	Rey Guevarra (4), Phoenix Fuel Masters
2019	Rey Guevarra (5), Phoenix Pulse Fuel Masters
2020–2022	No event held due to COVID-19
2023	David Murrell, Converge FiberXers
2024	Cancelled due to the injuries of participants
2025	Cancelled
2026	No event held

=== Blitz Game ===
==== Rookies vs. Sophomores ====
Year	Winning team	Score	Losing team	MVP (PBA team)	Venue
2005	Sophomores	122–106	Rookies	Nelbert Omolon (Sta. Lucia Realtors)	Ilocos Norte Centennial Arena, Laoag City
2006	Sophomores	130–123	Rookies	Nelbert Omolon (Sta. Lucia Realtors)	Xavier University Gym, Cagayan de Oro
2007	Rookies	122–107	Sophomores	Arwind Santos (Barako Bull Energy)	Pacoy Ortega Gym, San Fernando, La Union
2008	Rookies	101–97	Sophomores	Ronjay Buenafe (Coca-Cola Tigers)	West Negros University Gym, Bacolod
2010	Sophomores	106–86	Rookies	Jared Dillinger (Talk N' Text Tropang Texters)	Puerto Princesa Coliseum
2011	Rookies	114–109	Sophomores	Robert Labagala (Barangay Ginebra Kings); Sean Anthony (Powerade)	Boracay Convention Center, Boracay, Aklan
2015	Rookies	150–131	Sophomores	Matt Ganuelas-Rosser (Talk 'N Text Tropang Texters)	Puerto Princesa Coliseum, Puerto Princesa, Palawan

==== Team Greats vs. Team Stalwarts ====
From 2012 to 2014, The Rookies vs. Sophomores Blitz Game was replaced by the Team Stalwarts vs Team Greats, which each team composed of four PBA Legends and eight current PBA players. In 2016, the game was recontinued in place of the Blitz Game but stopped being held starting in 2017. The game returned in 2023 with both Team Stalwarts and Greats only composed of rookies, sophomores, and junior (third year) players.

Year	Winning team	Score	Losing team	MVP (PBA team)	Venue
2012	Greats	143–139	Stalwarts	Ato Agustin (Greats)	Ilocos Norte Centennial Arena, Laoag, Ilocos Norte
2013	Stalwarts	112–105	Greats	Kenneth Duremdes (Stalwarts)	Davao del Sur Coliseum, Digos, Davao del Sur
2014	Stalwarts	136–136	Greats	Rey Guevarra (Greats)	Mall of Asia Arena, Pasay
2016	Stalwarts	99–94	Greats	Raymond Almazan (Stalwarts)	Smart Araneta Coliseum, Quezon City
2023	Greats	158–138	Stalwarts	Adrian Wong (Greats)	City of Passi Arena, Passi, Iloilo
2024	Greats	142–133	Stalwarts	Justin Arana (Greats)	La Salle Coliseum, Bacolod, Negros Occidental

==== Rookies/Sophomores vs. Juniors ====
Year	Winning team	Score	Losing team	MVP (PBA team)	Venue
2019	Rookies/Sophomores	141–140	Juniors	CJ Perez (San Miguel Beermen)	Calasiao Sports Complex, Calasiao
2026	Rookies/Sophomores	154–150	Juniors	Jerom Lastimosa (Magnolia Chicken Timplados Hotshots)	Candon City Arena, Candon

== Other games ==
Year	Winning team	Score	Losing team	MVP	Venue
1990	PBL North	107–102	PBL South	–	The ULTRA, Pasig
1991	PBA Legends (Light)	103–101	PBA Legends (Dark)	Jimmy Santos (Light)	The ULTRA, Pasig
1991	PBA Dark All-Stars	95–94	China	–	The ULTRA, Pasig
1991	PBA Light All-Stars	105–95	China	–	The ULTRA, Pasig
1993 Celebrity All-Star Game	Four Da Boys	85–71	D'Kool Doods	Willie Revillame (Four Da Boys)	Cuneta Astrodome, Pasay
2000	PBA All-Stars	101–81	ABC All-Stars	Johnny Abarrientos (Alaska)	PhilSports Arena, Pasig
2003	Toyota	65–61	Crispa	Terry Saldaña (Toyota)	Araneta Coliseum, Quezon City
2005	PBA Legends	96–92	PBA Greats	Allan Caidic (PBA Legends)	Araneta Coliseum, Quezon City
2009	Powerade-Team Pilipinas	98–80	PBA North All-Stars	Mick Pennisi (San Miguel Beermen)	Victorias City Sports and Recreational Arena, Victorias, Negros Occidental
2009	Powerade-Team Pilipinas	103–99	PBA South All-Stars	Jared Dillinger (Talk 'N Text Tropang Texters)	Panabo City Tourism, Cultural and Sports Center, Panabo, Davao del Norte

== See also ==
- PBA All-Star Game
