= John Arigo =

Filipino-American basketball player

Personal information
- Born: December 10, 1978 (age 47) Charleston, South Carolina, U.S.
- Listed height: 6 ft 5 in (1.96 m)
- Listed weight: 185 lb (84 kg)

Career information
- High school: Orange Park (Orange Park, Florida)
- College: Tampa (1997–2000); North Florida (2000–2001)
- PBA draft: 2001: 1st round, 5th overall pick
- Drafted by: Alaska Aces
- Playing career: 2001–2009
- Position: Shooting guard / small forward
- Number: 31

Career history
- 2001–2004: Alaska Aces
- 2004–2009: Coca-Cola Tigers
- 2009: Barako Bull Energy Boosters

Career highlights
- PBA champion (2003 Invitational); 4× PBA All-Star (2001, 2003, 2006, 2007); PBA Mythical Second Team (2003); PBA All-Star Weekend Legends Shootout Champion (2008)

John Hartley Ward Arigo (born December 10, 1978), in Charleston, South Carolina, is a Filipino-American former professional basketball player having played for three teams in the Philippine Basketball Association over a nine-year career. He was drafted 5th overall by the Alaska Aces in January 2001 during his senior year of playing NCAA Division II basketball for the University of North Florida.

Prior to his stint with the UNF Ospreys in 2000, he played three collegiate years for the University of Tampa Spartans from 1997 to 2000, where he earned "Player of the Year" honors in 1999.

== PBA career statistics ==
Legend
GP	Games played	MPG	Minutes per game
FG%	Field-goal percentage	3P%	3-point field-goal percentage	FT%	Free-throw percentage
RPG	Rebounds per game	APG	Assists per game	SPG	Steals per game
BPG	Blocks per game	PPG	Points per game	**Bold**	Career high

=== Season-by-season averages ===
Year	Team	GP	MPG	FG%	3P%	FT%	RPG	APG	SPG	BPG	PPG
2001	Alaska	44	22.7	.416	.330	.803	2.9	1.4	.4	.1	8.6
2002	Alaska	53	25.7	**.445**	.344	.747	3.4	2.6	.3	.0	10.6
2003	Alaska	**56**	**34.0**	.412	.320	**.855**	**5.0**	2.9	.4	.1	14.7
2004–05	Alaska	42	31.2	.380	.250	.812	4.7	1.9	**.5**	.1	14.5
2004–05	Coca-Cola	42	31.2	.380	.250	.812	4.7	1.9	**.5**	.1	14.5
2005–06	Coca-Cola	39	30.9	.389	.242	.796	3.9	**3.0**	**.5**	**.2**	14.2
2006–07	Coca-Cola	40	32.5	.420	.318	.803	4.1	2.1	**.5**	**.2**	**17.0**
2007–08	Coca-Cola	17	17.5	.409	**.372**	.776	3.1	1.1	.4	.0	9.3
2008–09	Coca-Cola	28	19.9	.423	.364	.711	2.4	1.3	.1	.0	7.2
2008–09	Barako Bull	28	19.9	.423	.364	.711	2.4	1.3	.1	.0	7.2
Career		319	28.0	.410	.309	.803	3.8	2.2	.4	.1	12.4

== Personal life ==
John Arigo has a son John Abate, who is also a basketball player. He plays for Growling Tigers of the University of Santo Tomas.
