= 2016 PBA All-Star Weekend =

Basketball event

North All-Stars	South All-Stars
154	151
	1	2	3	4	Total
North All-Stars	42	37	38	37	154
South All-Stars	33	40	42	36	151
- Date: August 4–7, 2016
- Venue: Smart Araneta Coliseum, Quezon City
- MVP: Alex Cabagnot (San Miguel Beermen)
- Network: TV5/PBA Rush

The 2016 PBA All-Star Weekend was the annual all-star weekend of the Philippine Basketball Association (PBA)'s 2015–16 season which was held on August 4–7, 2016 at the Smart Araneta Coliseum, Quezon City. This was the fourth All-Star Weekend that was held at the Coliseum, the first since 2009.

== Schedule of events ==
The All-Star Weekend festivities started on August 4, 2016 with a visit of PBA players in the Heroes Ward of the V.Luna General Hospital, and a meet and greet session with the PBA players at the Ali Mall. The following day, there were the Obstacle Challenge, 3 point shootout, the slam dunk competition and the Blitz game between the Greats and Stalwarts, of which were held at the main venue.

On August 6, Saturday, a clinic for referees was conducted in a covered court of Brgy. Pinagkaisahan, Quezon City, followed by a basketball fair and another meet and greet session at the Food Court of the Coliseum. An exhibition game between selected PBA board members and executives including PBA Commissioner Chito Narvasa, 1-Pacman Representative and GlobalPort Batang Pier team owner Mikee Romero and Special Assistant to the President Christopher Go and the members of the PBA Press Corps was also held at the venue itself.

On the final day of the event, a shooting stars contest and a women's 5x5 basketball exhibition were held, before the exhibition game between the North All-Stars and the South All-Stars, the main event of the All-Star Weekend.

== Friday events ==
=== Greats vs Stalwarts ===
This year's Blitz Game saw the return of Greats vs Stalwarts. The game included young PBA players, selected players from PBA D-League and PBA Legends.

Greats
Pos.	Player	Team
G	Maverick Ahanmisi	Rain or Shine Elasto Painters
G	Kevin Alas	NLEX Road Warriors
F	Anthony Semerad	GlobalPort Batang Pier
F/C	Ian Sangalang	Star Hotshots
G	Ed Daquioag	Phoenix Petroleum Accelerators
F	Mac Belo	Phoenix Petroleum Accelerators
G	Roger Pogoy	Phoenix Petroleum Accelerators
G	Jonathan Grey	Racal Tile Master
F/C	Noli Locsin	PBA Legend
C	Paolo Bugia	PBA Legend
G	Bong Ravena	PBA Legend
G	Johnny Abarrientos	PBA Legend
Head coach: Bong Ravena

Stalwarts
Pos.	Player	Team
G	Chris Banchero	Alaska Aces
G	Manny Pacquiao	Mahindra Enforcer
F	David Semerad	San Miguel Beermen
C	Raymond Almazan	Rain or Shine Elasto Painters
G	Mike Tolomia	Phoenix Petroleum Accelerators
PF/C	Russel Escoto	Phoenix Petroleum Accelerators
G	Raphael Banal	Racal Tile Master
F	Bryan Cruz	Café France Bakers
F	Alvin Patrimonio	PBA Legend
F	Nic Belasco	PBA Legend
G	Ronnie Magsanoc	PBA Legend
G	Topex Robinson	PBA Legend
Head coach: Ronnie Magsanoc

==== Game ====
Sports5

August 5
7:00pm

Boxscore

Greats 94, Stalwarts 99
Scoring by quarter: 20–25, 23–16, 28–27, 23–31
Pts: Sangalang 14; Rebs: Locsin 11; Asts: Ahanmisi, Daquioag 5	Pts: Almazan 23; Rebs: Almazan 12; Asts: Tolomia 6

Smart Araneta Coliseum, Quezon City
Referees: E. Tankion, N. Guevarra, R. Dacanay, J. Oliva

- Greats vs. Stalwarts Game MVP: Raymond Almazan (Stalwarts)

=== Obstacle Challenge ===
Contestants
Pos.	Player	Team	Height	Weight	First round	Final round
G	Maverick Ahanmisi	Rain or Shine Elasto Painters	6–2	190	Advanced to final round	32.95s
G	Carlo Lastimosa	Blackwater Elite	6–0	182	Advanced to final round	34.11s
G	Mark Cruz	Phoenix Fuel Masters	5–5	150	Advanced to final round	36.96s
G	Mark Barroca	Star Hotshots	5–10	170	Advanced to final round	45.23s
G	Paolo Taha	Mahindra Enforcer	6–0	180	Advanced to final round	46.11s
G	Scottie Thompson	Barangay Ginebra San Miguel	6–1	180	Advanced to final round	49.48s
G	Brian Heruela	San Miguel Beermen	5–10	195	Eliminated	
G	Chris Banchero	Alaska Aces	6–1	175	Eliminated	
G	Jeric Fortuna	GlobalPort Batang Pier	5–8	170	Eliminated	
G	Chris Newsome	Meralco Bolts	6–2	190	Eliminated	
G	Emman Monfort	NLEX Road Warriors	5–6	132	Eliminated	
G	Jai Reyes	TNT KaTropa	5–7	150	Eliminated	

- Gold represent the current champion.

==== First round ====
The winners of each pairing in the first round advanced to the final round.

- Scottie Thompson def. Chris Banchero
- Carlo Lastimosa def. Jeric Fortuna
- Paolo Taha def. Chris Newsome
- Mark Cruz def. Emman Monfort
- Maverick Ahanmisi def. Brian Heruela
- Mark Barroca def. Jai Reyes

=== Three-Point Contest ===
Contestants
Pos.	Player	Team	Height	Weight	First round	Final round
G	Terrence Romeo	GlobalPort Batang Pier	5–11	178	24	20
F	Niño Canaleta	Mahindra Enforcer	6–6	200	25	17
G	RJ Jazul	Alaska Aces	5–11	170	22	17
G	Garvo Lañete	NLEX Road Warriors	6–2	183	20	did not advance
G	James Yap	Star Hotshots	6–3	205	19	did not advance
F	Troy Rosario	TNT KaTropa	6–7	218	16	did not advance
G	Jeffrei Chan	Rain or Shine Elasto Painters	6–2	185	14	did not advance
G	Jayjay Helterbrand	Barangay Ginebra San Miguel	5–11	170	14	did not advance
F	Jared Dillinger	Meralco Bolts	6–4	220	13	did not advance
G	Almond Vosotros	Blackwater Elite	5–10	160	9	did not advance
G	Simon Enciso	Phoenix Fuel Masters	5–11	185	7	did not advance
G	Alex Cabagnot	San Miguel Beermen	6–0	180	7	did not advance

- Gold represent current champion.

=== Slam Dunk Contest ===
Contestants
Pos.	Player	Team	Height	Weight	First round	Final round
G	Rey Guevarra	Meralco Bolts	6–3	190	94 (45+49)	97 (50+47)
G	Chris Newsome	Meralco Bolts	6–2	190	88 (40+48)	96 (46+50)
G	Franklin Bonifacio	Barangay Ginebra San Miguel	6–2	180	80 (45+35)	did not advance
G	James Forrester	NLEX Road Warriors	6–2	190	74 (25+49)	did not advance

- Gold represent the current champion.

== Saturday Events ==
An exhibition game between PBA Board and PBA Press Corps was held while having a basketball fair for the fans outside of the Smart Araneta Coliseum.

=== Game ===
August 6
7:30pm

Recap

PBA Board 113, PBA Press Corps 94
Scoring by quarter: 28–29, 25–20, 31–23, 29–22
Pts: Mikee Romero 30	Pts: Cedelf Tupas 27

Smart Araneta Coliseum, Quezon City

== Sunday events ==
=== Shooting Stars ===
The return of the Shooting Stars had a different format. There was one PBA player, one Women's 3x3 player, one Batang PBA player and a lucky fan from Cignal TV. Team B led by Jericho Cruz of Rain or Shine Elasto Painters won the Shooting Stars.

Team Name	Team Leader	Time
Team B	Jericho Cruz	1:12
Team C	Terrence Romeo	1:22
Team A	Scottie Thompson	2:00

=== Women's 5 on 5 game ===
The Women's 5 on 5 game was composed of players from the league's Women's 3 on 3 tournament. The game was played in 12 minute halves.

Team A (Light)
Pos.	Player	Team
	Analyn Almazan	NLEX Road Warriors
	Ewon Arayi	Alaska Aces
	Norilyn Japitana	Phoenix Fuel Masters
	Camille Ramos	Alaska Aces
	Jaqueline Suarez	GlobalPort Batang Pier
	May Confessor	Mahindra Enforcer
	Cecile Junsay	Star Hotshots
	Jhustine Rala	Star Hotshots
	Monika Reyes	Barangay Ginebra San Miguel
	Alyssa Vega	Mahindra Enforcer
Head coach: Raymond Celis (NLEX Road Warriors)

Team B (Dark)
Pos.	Player	Team
	Macelie Abaca	Rain or Shine Elasto Painters
	Regina dela Merced	TNT KaTropa
	Ayra Hufanda	San Miguel Beermen
	Rubelyn Mendoza	Rain or Shine Elasto Painters
	Sarah Mercado	TNT KaTropa
	Jelline Batnag	Blackwater Elite
	Chovi Borja	San Miguel Beermen
	Frances Galang	GlobalPort Batang Pier
	Francine Geli	Meralco Bolts
	Micah Torres	Meralco Bolts
Head coach: Mike Buendia (Rain or Shine Elasto Painters)

==== Game ====
Sports5

August 7
5:30pm

Boxscore

Light 43, Dark 35
Scoring by half: 19–12, 24–23
Pts: Almazan 14; Rebs: Almazan, Arayi 7 Asts: Arayi 3	Pts: Abaca 10; Rebs: Borja 6 Asts: Abaca 3

Smart Araneta Coliseum, Quezon City
Referees: J. Nicandro, M. Orioste, E. Botecario

=== All-Star Game ===
==== Coaches ====
Yeng Guiao, coach of the Rain or Shine Elasto Painters, and Leo Austria, coach of the San Miguel Beermen, were selected as the North and the South head coach, respectively.

==== Roster ====
The rosters for the All-Star Game were chosen in two ways. The starters were chosen via a fan ballot (online and at the venue during PBA games). Players are assigned to represent the North or South All-Star teams based from their place of birth. Players born in Luzon are assigned to the North All-Stars team while players born in Visayas and Mindanao are assigned to represent the South All-Stars. If the player is born outside the Philippines, the player is assigned to his parents' birthplace. Two guards and three frontcourt players who received the highest vote were named the All-Star starters. The reserves are voted by the twelve PBA coaches after the results of the fan ballot are released.

North All-Stars
Pos	Player	Team	No. of selections	Votes
Starters
G	Mark Caguioa	Barangay Ginebra San Miguel	10	
G	Terrence Romeo	GlobalPort Batang Pier	2	
F	Marc Pingris	Star Hotshots	12	
F/C	Japeth Aguilar	Barangay Ginebra San Miguel	4	
F	Calvin Abueva^{INJ1}	Alaska Aces	4	
Reserves
G	Jayson Castro	TNT KaTropa	4	—
G	Alex Cabagnot	San Miguel Beermen	4	—
F/G	Gabe Norwood^{ST1}	Rain or Shine Elasto Painters	8	—
G	Paul Lee	Rain or Shine Elasto Painters	5	—
F	Ranidel de Ocampo	TNT KaTropa	7	—
G	Stanley Pringle	GlobalPort Batang Pier	2	—
F/C	Troy Rosario	TNT KaTropa	1	—
Head coach: Yeng Guiao (Rain or Shine Elasto Painters)

South All-Stars
Pos	Player	Team	No. of selections	Votes
Starters
G	James Yap	Star Hotshots	13	
G	Scottie Thompson	Barangay Ginebra San Miguel	1	
C	Greg Slaughter^{INJ2}	Barangay Ginebra San Miguel	3	
C	June Mar Fajardo	San Miguel Beermen	4	
F	Joe Devance	Barangay Ginebra San Miguel	5	
Reserves
F/C	J.R. Quiñahan	Rain or Shine Elasto Painters	2	—
G/F	Jeffrei Chan	Rain or Shine Elasto Painters	4	—
G	Jericho Cruz	Rain or Shine Elasto Painters	1	—
G	Chris Ross	San Miguel Beermen	2	—
G	Mark Barroca	Star Hotshots	4	—
G	RR Garcia	Star Hotshots	1	—
G	Carlo Lastimosa	Blackwater Elite	1	—
C	Asi Taulava^{ST2}	NLEX Road Warriors	14	—
Head coach: Leo Austria (San Miguel Beermen)

- INJ1 Calvin Abueva was unable to participate due to chronic tonsilitis and dehydration
- INJ2 Greg Slaughter was unable to participate due to an injured ankle
- ^ST1 Gabe Norwood started in place of Calvin Abueva
- ^ST2 Asi Taulava started in place of Greg Slaughter

==== Game ====
Sports5

August 7
7:00pm

Boxscore

North All-Stars 154, South All-Stars 151
Scoring by quarter: 42–33, 37–40, 38–42, 37–36
Pts: Cabagnot 29; Rebs: de Ocampo 10; Asts: Romeo 6	Pts: Fajardo 25; Rebs: Fajardo 9 Asts: Barroca 7

Smart Araneta Coliseum, Quezon City
Referees: N. Quilinguen, P. Balao, N. Guevarra, E. Tangkion, B. Oliva, D. Dacanay

- All-Star Game MVP: Alex Cabagnot (North)

== See also ==
- 2015–16 PBA season
- Philippine Basketball Association
- Philippine Basketball Association All-Star Weekend
