= Emman Monfort =

Filipino basketball player

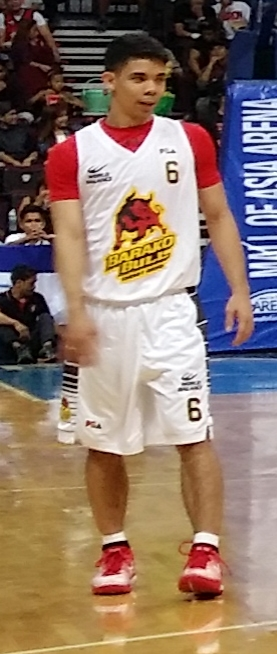

NLEX Road Warriors
- Title: Assistant coach
- League: PBA

Personal information
- Born: July 2, 1989 (age 37) Iloilo City, Philippines
- Listed height: 5 ft 6 in (1.68 m)
- Listed weight: 132 lb (60 kg)

Career information
- High school: Ateneo de Iloilo (Iloilo City)
- College: Ateneo
- PBA draft: 2012: 2nd round, 16th overall pick
- Drafted by: Barako Bull Energy Cola
- Playing career: 2012–2019
- Position: Point guard
- Coaching career: 2020–present

Career history

Playing
- 2012–2013: Barako Bull Energy Cola
- 2013–2015: Barangay Ginebra San Miguel
- 2015–2016: Barako Bull Energy
- 2016: Phoenix Fuel Masters
- 2016–2019: NLEX Road Warriors

Coaching
- 2020–present: NLEX Road Warriors (assistant)

Career highlights
- PBA All-Star (2018); 3× UAAP champion (2009–2011); 2× PCCL champion (2009, 2010); 2x UNIGAMES champion (2008, 2009); FilOil Flying V Cup champion (2011)

Emmanuel N. Monfort (born July 2, 1989) is a Filipino basketball coach and former player. He is an assistant coach for the NLEX Road Warriors of the Philippine Basketball Association (PBA). He was selected 16th overall in the 2012 PBA draft by Barako Bull Energy Cola. At 5’6” 1/16 inches, he is one of the shortest players in PBA history.

Monfort won three championships during his collegiate career with the Ateneo Blue Eagles in the UAAP from 2009 to 2011. He also won a gold medal in the 2011 SEA Games.

== Early life ==
In Grade 3, Monfort started playing organized basketball. He started out as a benchwarmer for St. Joseph's Grade School Iloilo. When he was in Grade 5, he watched the 2000 PBA All-Star Game, held in his hometown of Iloilo, and met Danny Seigle, which inspired him to pursue basketball. His parents also encouraged him to pursue basketball despite his height. He also participated in basketball clinics and tournaments held by the Milo BEST Center. In high school at Ateneo de Iloilo, he was scoring 40 points. He was teammates with Anjo Caram, another short point guard. He also got to play in the 2005 Palarong Pambansa.

== College career ==
Monfort was recruited to join the Ateneo Blue Eagles by Coach Norman Black, who asked him to first join their scrimmages in Silay City in Bacolod. Monfort and his mother took a boat ride to get to the scrimmages, where, despite his appearance, he impressed the coaching staff.

During Monfort's first year, Ateneo lost to the UST Growling Tigers in the Finals. They then lost to the DLSU Green Archers during the stepladder postseason the following year. He was then relegated to Ateneo's Team B, Ateneo's practice team, for a season. As a result, he was not part of the Ateneo roster that won the UAAP championship in 2008. He got to play with the main team again during the Unigames later that year, which Ateneo won.

In 2009, Monfort was set to spend another year with Team B, but a player was suddenly deemed ineligible on Ateneo's main team which opened up a slot for him to return. He scored a season-high 20 points in a win over UST. That year, Ateneo defended its UAAP title as he contributed as Jai Reyes's backup. Ateneo also won the Philippine Collegiate Champions League (PCCL) title and defended its Unigames title that year.

For Season 73, with Reyes graduated from college, Monfort succeeded him as Ateneo's starting lead guard. In a win over the Adamson Soaring Falcons, he made six straight clutch free throws to seal the win. He then scored a college career-high 23 points with five triples while also providing five assists, four steals and four rebounds in a win over the UP Fighting Maroons. In the Final Four, he scored 22 points on 7-of-9 shooting and made all three of his three-point attempts to get Ateneo past Adamson and into the Finals. In Game 2 of the Finals, he scored 10 points as Ateneo won its third straight title thanks to a game-winning three-pointer from Ryan Buenafe. To finish the year, Ateneo successfully defended its PCCL title.

During the preseason, Ateneo won the Filoil Flying V Hanes Preseason Premier Cup. The Eagles began Season 74 with a win over Adamson in which Monfort made two clutch free throws with 16.3 seconds remaining to seal the victory. He then scored 10 points in a win over the Archers. In a win over the Maroons, he scored 13 points. Ateneo finished the first round of eliminations with no losses. In the second round of eliminations, he scored 13 points in a win over the Archers. Ateneo had a chance to sweep both elimination rounds but in their final game of the season, they lost to Adamson. After getting past UST in the Final Four, they faced the FEU Tamaraws in the Finals. In Game 1, he contributed 11 points, five rebounds, five assists and two steals in a win. Ateneo also won Game 2, making them champions for the fourth straight year. In his final year, he graduated as the UAAP leader in assists and free throw percentage.

== Professional career ==
=== Barako Bull Energy Cola ===
Monfort came into the 2012 PBA draft at 5’6” 1/16 inches and weighing 132 lbs. He was able to lead all draft applicants in push-ups with 100. He was taken as the 16th overall pick in the 2012 PBA draft out of Ateneo De Manila University by Barako Bull. However, two different injuries to his right hand forced him to sit out the entire 2012–13 Philippine Cup and the early part of the 2013 Commissioner's Cup.

Monfort made his debut in Barako's game against the San Mig Coffee Mixers. With 19 seconds left in the game, he split his free throws to give Barako a three-point lead. The team was able to pull out a 105–100 win over San Mig, ending their six-game losing streak. In that game, he only had three points (all coming from the free throw line), but had a team-high five assists, two rebounds, and a steal as well. In the Governors' Cup, he saw more minutes due to Jonas Villanueva's ACL injury. In a win over the Meralco Bolts, he scored 22 points. He then reset his career-high with 25 points alongside two rebounds, two assists and two steals.in a win over Ginebra. For his performances, he was awarded as the league's Player of the Week.

It was during his rookie season when he got his nickname The Minion, due to his size and fanbase. He only played in just 12 games due to various injuries in his rookie season, but when he was on the court, he showed that he could run a team like a veteran in his first team as a professional PBA player.

=== Barangay Ginebra San Miguel ===
On October 31, 2013, he was traded to Barangay Ginebra San Miguel to bolster their backcourt, sending Robert Labagala to Barako Bull. There, he was the backup to LA Tenorio, a former Ateneo point guard. In a 2013–14 Philippine Cup win over the Talk 'N Text Tropang Texters, he didn't score a point, but made an impact on the game with two rebounds and five assists. He then played 24 minutes in a win over the Alaska Aces and contributed five rebounds (including two offensive), five assists and two steals. In a game against his former team Barako, with Ginebra down by 10, he ignited a rally with his defense and three-pointers that led to Ginebra taking the win.

Monfort was hardly used during the 2014–15 Philippine Cup. He got more minutes the following conference and even started several games.

=== Return to Barako Bull ===
On August 25, 2015, he was traded to Barako Bull Energy with Josh Urbiztondo and Jens Knuttel in exchange for Nico Salva and a future first-round pick.

=== Phoenix Fuel Masters ===
In a 2016 Commissioner's Cup loss to Ginebra, Monfort scored 10 points.

=== NLEX Road Warriors ===
Before the start of the 2016 Governors' Cup, Monfort and Mac Baracael were traded by Phoenix to the NLEX Road Warriors for Simon Enciso, a 2018 Draft second-round pick and Mark Borboran. That season, he competed in the Obstacle Challenge. He scored a season-high 12 points in a loss to Meralco. In 2017, he got third place in the Obstacle Challenge.

In 2018, despite averaging 1.8 points on 30-percent shooting, 2.2 rebounds, and 1.8 assists in 11.3 minutes in the Commissioner's Cup, he was included in the PBA All-Star Visayan team, as the All-Star Game for the Visayan leg was hosted by his hometown. In that game, he contributed five points, five rebounds, and six assists in their win over the Smart Gilas All-Stars. He and his team also won the Shooting Stars Challenge. He was in and out of NLEX's lineup the following season before transitioning to coaching in 2020.

== PBA career statistics ==
Legend
GP	Games played	MPG	Minutes per game
FG%	Field-goal percentage	3P%	3-point field-goal percentage	FT%	Free-throw percentage
RPG	Rebounds per game	APG	Assists per game	SPG	Steals per game
BPG	Blocks per game	PPG	Points per game	**Bold**	Career high

=== Season-by-season averages ===
Year	Team	GP	MPG	FG%	3P%	FT%	RPG	APG	SPG	BPG	PPG
2012–13	Barako Bull	12	**27.8**	.361	.328	.769	2.3	**5.0**	.8	.0	**9.1**
2013–14	Barangay Ginebra	**34**	9.9	.271	.260	.750	1.4	1.4	.4	.0	1.9
2014–15	Barangay Ginebra	20	14.5	.389	.310	**.833**	**2.7**	1.7	**.9**	**.1**	2.8
2015–16	Barako Bull / Phoenix / NLEX	**34**	16.2	.357	.318	**.833**	1.9	2.6	.9	.0	4.6
2016–17	NLEX	23	13.6	.467	.364	.800	1.9	1.6	**1.0**	.0	3.1
2017–18	NLEX	20	11.1	.408	.333	.533	1.9	1.7	.7	.0	2.7
2019	NLEX	3	14.6	**.600**	**.571**	.667	2.3	4.0	.3	.0	6.7
Career		146	15.4	.408	.355	.741	2.1	2.6	.7	.0	4.4

== National team career ==
In 2011, Monfort and other collegiate stars were called up to represent the Philippines in the 2011 SEA Games. They dominated the tournament, and won a gold medal. The following year, he was called up for the SEABA Cup. They won that tournament as well.

== Coaching career ==
In 2020, Monfort transitioned to the role of an assistant coach of the NLEX Road Warriors. In 2021, it was announced that he and Borgie Hermida would be coaching the Cavitex Braves, the PBA 3x3 affiliate of NLEX.

Monfort also sponsors and coaches basketball clinics for children.
