= 2025 PBA All-Star Weekend =

Cancelled PBA All-Star Weekend

Veterans	Rookies-Sophomores-Juniors
- Date: May 2–4, 2025 (originally)
- Venue: Panabo, Davao del Norte (originally)

The 2025 PBA All-Star Weekend was the cancelled annual all-star weekend of the Philippine Basketball Association (PBA)'s 2024–25 season.

Originally scheduled to from May 2 to 4, 2025 in Davao the event was postponed on April 16 due to "security concerns" in Metro Davao arising from the arrest of former president Rodrigo Duterte. The event was already planned to be held in the Davao Region as early as March 2024, after the two previous editions was held in the Visayas.

This prompted the PBA to move the host province. The league then tried to move the event to May 16 to 18, in an undisclosed province in the Visayas. However due to availability issues the event was cancelled altogether.

== Friday events ==
The three-point shootout event was confirmed with the Slam Dunk Contest being considered for reinstatement.

An All-Mindanao exhibition game between two teams composed of Mindanao-born players was planned in Davao City.

== Sunday events ==
Fans voted for the composition of both thee Rookies-Sophomores-Juniors (RSJ) and All-Stars (Veterans) teams from February 5 to April 13, 2025. The game was planned to be held in Panabo.
