= 2019 PBA All-Star Weekend =

North All-Stars	South All-Stars
185	170
	1	2	3	4	Total
North All-Stars	51	38	48	48	185
South All-Stars	25	50	47	48	170
- Date: March 29–31, 2019
- Venue: Calasiao Sports Complex, Calasiao, Pangasinan
- MVP: Japeth Aguilar and Arwind Santos (Co-MVPs)
- Network: TV5

The 2019 PBA All-Star Weekend was the annual all-star weekend of the Philippine Basketball Association (PBA)'s 2019 season. The events were held at the Calasiao Sports Complex in Calasiao, Pangasinan. Highlighting the weekend will be the return of the North vs. South format of the All-Star game.

== Friday events ==
=== Rookies/Sophomores vs. Juniors game ===
Rookies/Sophomores
Pos.	Player	Team
G/F	CJ Perez	Columbian Dyip
F	Javee Mocon	Rain or Shine Elasto Painters
G/F	Robbie Herndon	Magnolia Hotshots Pambansang Manok
G	Paul Desiderio	Blackwater Elite
F	Jason Perkins	Phoenix Pulse Fuel Masters
G	Robert Bolick	NorthPort Batang Pier
G	Mac Tallo	NLEX Road Warriors
G	Rey Nambatac	Rain or Shine Elasto Painters
G	Trevis Jackson	Meralco Bolts
C	Abu Tratter	Blackwater Elite
F	Raymar Jose	Blackwater Elite
Head coach: Chris Gavina (Rain or Shine Elasto Painters)

Juniors
Pos.	Player	Team
G/F	Matthew Wright	Phoenix Pulse Fuel Masters
G/F	Roger Pogoy	TNT KaTropa
F	Mac Belo	Blackwater Elite
G	Jio Jalalon	Magnolia Hotshots Pambansang Manok
F	Kevin Ferrer	Barangay Ginebra San Miguel
G	Ed Daquioag	Rain or Shine Elasto Painters
G	Mike Tolomia	Meralco Bolts
G	Von Pessumal	San Miguel Beermen
C/F	Russel Escoto	Columbian Dyip
F	Carl Bryan Cruz	Alaska Aces
G	Rashawn McCarthy	Columbian Dyip
G	Raphael Banal	Blackwater Elite
Head coach: Topex Robinson (Phoenix Pulse Fuel Masters)

==== Game ====
ESPN5

March 29
7:00pm

Rookies/Sophomores 141, Juniors 140
Scoring by quarter: 40–29, 33–47, 33–36, 35–28
Pts: Perez 32	Pts: McCarthy 24

Calasiao Sports Complex, Pangasinan

=== Obstacle Challenge ===
==== First round ====
The winners of each pairing in the first round advanced to the final round.

- Beau Belga def. Kyle Pascual
- Bryan Faundo def. June Mar Fajardo
- Yousef Taha def. Nonoy Baclao
- Justin Chua def. Marion Magat
- Raymar Jose def. Moala Tautuaa
- Russel Escoto def. Prince Caperal

==== Second round ====
- Beau Belga def. Bryan Faundo
- Yousef Taha def. Marion Magat
- Raymar Jose def. Russel Escoto

==== Final round ====
Pos.	Player	Team	Time
F	Beau Belga	Rain or Shine Elasto Painters	21.0s
F	Russel Escoto	Columbian Dyip	21.3s
C	Yousef Taha	TNT KaTropa	26.3s

=== Three-Point Contest ===
Contestants
Pos.	Player	Team	Height	Weight	First round	Final round
G	Terrence Romeo	GlobalPort Batang Pier	5–11	178	24	20
F	KG Canaleta	Mahindra Enforcer	6–6	200	25	17
G	RJ Jazul	Alaska Aces	5–11	170	22	17
G	Garvo Lanete	NLEX Road Warriors	6–2	183	20	did not advance
G	James Yap	Star Hotshots	6–3	205	19	did not advance
F	Troy Rosario	TNT KaTropa	6–7	218	16	did not advance
G	Jeff Chan	Rain or Shine Elasto Painters	6–2	185	14	did not advance
G	Jayjay Helterbrand	Barangay Ginebra San Miguel	5–11	170	14	did not advance
F	Jared Dillinger	Meralco Bolts	6–4	220	13	did not advance
G	Almond Vosotros	Blackwater Elite	5–10	160	9	did not advance
G	Simon Enciso	Phoenix Fuel Masters	5–11	185	7	did not advance
G	Alex Cabagnot	San Miguel Beermen	6–0	180	7	did not advance

- Gold represent current champion.

=== Slam Dunk Contest ===
Contestants
Pos.	Player	Team	Height	Weight	First round	Final round
G	Rey Guevarra	Phoenix Pulse Fuel Masters	6–3	190	94 (45+49)	97 (50+47)
G	Chris Newsome	Meralco Bolts	6–2	190	88 (40+48)	96 (46+50)
G	Franklin Bonifacio	Barangay Ginebra San Miguel	6–2	180	80 (45+35)	did not advance
G	James Forrester	NLEX Road Warriors	6–2	190	74 (25+49)	did not advance

- Gold represent the current champion.

== Sunday events ==
=== Shooting Stars ===
The team led by Gabe Norwood won the event, defeating teams led by Alex Cabagnot and Chris Ross.

=== All-Star Game ===
==== Roster ====
The rosters for the All-Star Game were chosen in two ways. The starters were chosen via a fan ballot (online and at the venue during PBA games). Players are assigned to represent the North or South All-Star teams based from their place of birth. Players born in Luzon are assigned to the North All-Stars team while players born in Visayas and Mindanao are assigned to represent the South All-Stars. If the player is born outside the Philippines, the player is assigned to his parents' birthplace. Two guards and three frontcourt players who received the highest vote were named the All-Star starters. The reserves are voted by the twelve PBA coaches after the results of the fan ballot are released.

North All-Stars
Pos	Player	Team	No. of selections	Votes
Starters
G	Paul Lee	Magnolia Hotshots Pambansang Manok		
G	LA Tenorio	Barangay Ginebra San Miguel		
G/F	Marcio Lassiter	San Miguel Beermen		
F/C	Japeth Aguilar	Barangay Ginebra San Miguel		
F	Calvin Abueva	Phoenix Pulse Fuel Masters		
Reserves
G	Jayson Castro	TNT KaTropa		—
G	Alex Cabagnot	San Miguel Beermen		—
F/G	Gabe Norwood	Rain or Shine Elasto Painters		—
G	Mark Caguioa	Barangay Ginebra San Miguel		—
F	Chris Banchero	Alaska Aces		—
G	Arwind Santos	San Miguel Beermen		—
F/C	Troy Rosario	TNT KaTropa		—
F	Jason Perkins	Phoenix Pulse Fuel Masters		—
C	Benjie Paras			—
G	Ronnie Magsanoc			—
Head coach: Louie Alas (Phoenix Pulse Fuel Masters)

South All-Stars
Pos	Player	Team	No. of selections	Votes
Starters
G	Scottie Thompson	Barangay Ginebra San Miguel		
G	Mark Barroca	Magnolia Hotshots Pambansang Manok		
C	Greg Slaughter	Barangay Ginebra San Miguel		
C	June Mar Fajardo	San Miguel Beermen		
G/F	James Yap	Rain or Shine Elasto Painters		
Reserves
G	Terrence Romeo	San Miguel Beermen		—
G	Baser Amer	Meralco Bolts		—
G	Peter June Simon	Magnolia Hotshots Pambansang Manok		—
F	Mac Belo	Blackwater Elite		—
G/F	Roger Pogoy	TNT KaTropa		—
G	Chris Ross	San Miguel Beermen		—
G	Jio Jalalon	Magnolia Hotshots Pambansang Manok		—
C	Poy Erram	NLEX Road Warriors		—
C	Asi Taulava	NLEX Road Warriors		—
F	Alvin Patrimonio			—
C	Jerry Codiñera			—
Head coach: Caloy Garcia (Rain or Shine Elasto Painters)

===== Game =====
ESPN5

March 31
6:45pm

Boxscore

North All-Stars 185, South All-Stars 170
Scoring by quarter: 51–25, 38–50, 48–47, 48–48
Pts: Santos 34; Rebs: Santos 17; Asts: Tenorio 15	Pts: Simon 34; Rebs: Fajardo 13; Asts: Jalalon 12

Calasiao Sports Complex, Pangasinan
Referees: P. Balao, R. Gruta, B. Oliva, J. Nicandro, M. Orioste

- All-Star Game MVP: Japeth Aguilar and Arwind Santos (co-winners; North All-Stars)

== See also ==
- 2019 PBA season
- Philippine Basketball Association
- Philippine Basketball Association All-Star Weekend
