= 2018 PBA All-Star Week =

- Date: May 23–27, 2018
- Venue: Davao Del Sur Coliseum, Digos; Batangas City Coliseum, Batangas City; University of San Agustin Gym, Iloilo City
- Network: ESPN5

The 2018 PBA All-Star Week is the annual all-star week of the Philippine Basketball Association (PBA)'s 2017–18 season being held on May 23 to 27, 2018 on three different venues covering Luzon (Batangas), Visayas (Iloilo) and Mindanao (Davao).

== Mindanao leg ==
=== All-Star Game ===
==== Roster ====
PBA Mindanao All-Stars
Pos	Player	Team	No. of selections
Starters
G	Mark Barroca	Magnolia Hotshots Pambansang Manok	6
G	Peter June Simon	Magnolia Hotshots Pambansang Manok	7
G	Jio Jalalon	Magnolia Hotshots Pambansang Manok	2
G	Scottie Thompson	Barangay Ginebra San Miguel	3
F	Mac Belo	Blackwater Elite	2
Reserves
G	Baser Amer	Meralco Bolts	2
G/F	Cyrus Baguio	NLEX Road Warriors	11
C	Sonny Thoss	Alaska Aces	12
F/C	Rafi Reavis	Magnolia Hotshots Pambansang Manok	4
C	John Paul Erram	Blackwater Elite	1
G	RR Garcia	TNT KaTropa	3
G	Carlo Lastimosa	Columbian Dyip	3
Head coach: Tim Cone (Barangay Ginebra San Miguel)

Smart PBA All-Stars
Pos	Player	Team	No. of selections
Starters
C	June Mar Fajardo	San Miguel Beermen	6
G/F	Matthew Wright	Phoenix Fuel Masters	2
G	Jayson Castro^{ST1}	TNT KaTropa	6
G	Kiefer Ravena^{ST2}	NLEX Road Warriors	1
F	Calvin Abueva	Alaska Aces	6
F	Carl Bryan Cruz^{DNP1}	Alaska Aces	2
F/C	Troy Rosario^{DNP2}	TNT KaTropa	3
Reserves
G	Terrence Romeo	TNT KaTropa	3
F/C	Japeth Aguilar	Barangay Ginebra San Miguel	6
F/G	Gabe Norwood	Rain or Shine Elasto Painters	9
G/F	Allein Maliksi	Blackwater Elite	2
F/G	Roger Pogoy^{DNP3}	TNT KaTropa	2
Head coach: Norman Black (Meralco Bolts)

- ^DNP1 Carl Bryan Cruz was unable to participate.
- ^ST1 Jayson Castro started in place of Carl Bryan Cruz.
- ^DNP2 Roger Pogoy was unable to participate.
- ^ST2 Kiefer Ravena started in place of Troy Rosario.
- ^DNP3 Troy Rosario was unable to participate.

=== Game ===
ESPN 5

May 23
8:00pm

Box score

PBA Mindanao All-Stars 144, Smart PBA All-Stars 130
Scoring by quarter: 32–28, 33–35, 39–36, 40–31
Pts: Amer 22; Rebs: Amer 7 Asts: Jalalon 9	Pts: Fajardo 34; Rebs: Fajardo 14; Asts: Romeo 10

Davao Del Sur Coliseum, Digos
Referees: J. Mariano, N. Guevarra, M. Montoya, M. Flordeliza

- All-Star Mindanao Leg MVP: Baser Amer (PBA Mindanao)

== Luzon leg ==
=== Obstacle Challenge ===
This edition was exclusively only for big men (power forwards and centers).

Contestants
Pos.	Player	Team	Height	Weight
F	Beau Belga	Rain or Shine Elasto Painters	6–6	235
C	John Paul Erram	Blackwater Elite	6–8	227
F	Gabby Espinas	San Miguel Beermen	6–4	208
F	Justin Chua	Phoenix Fuel Masters	6–6	232
F	Kelly Nabong	GlobalPort Batang Pier	6–6	227
C	Yousef Taha	TNT KaTropa	6–7	231
F	Russel Escoto	Columbian Dyip	6–6	210
C	Sonny Thoss	Alaska Aces	6–7	205
F	Aldrech Ramos	Magnolia Hotshots Pambansang Manok	6–6	190
F	Ken Bono	Meralco Bolts	6–5	280
C	Asi Taulava	NLEX Road Warriors	6–9	245
F	Raymond Aguilar	Barangay Ginebra San Miguel	6–5	200

Gabby Espinas replaced Yancy de Ocampo, who was unable to participate.

First Round
Justin Chua (Phoenix)	O
Russel Escoto (Columbian)	X
Beau Belga (Rain or Shine)	O
Sonny Thoss (Alaska)	X

Semifinals
Justin Chua (Phoenix)	X
Beau Belga (Rain or Shine)	O

First Round
John Paul Erram (Blackwater)	O
Aldrech Ramos (Magnolia)	X
Kelly Nabong (GlobalPort)	O
Ken Bono (Meralco)	X

Semifinals
John Paul Erram (Blackwater)	O
Kelly Nabong (GlobalPort)	X

First Round
Gabby Espinas (San Miguel)	O
Asi Taulava (NLEX)	X
Yousef Taha (TNT)	O
Raymond Aguilar (Ginebra)	X

Semifinals
Gabby Espinas (San Miguel)	O
Yousef Taha (TNT)	X

Final round
Pos.	Player	Team	Time
F	Beau Belga	Rain or Shine Elasto Painters	21.7s
C	John Paul Erram	Blackwater Elite	29.6s
F	Gabby Espinas	San Miguel Beermen	30.5s

=== Three-Point Shootout ===
This year's shootout featured a new format. Each of the five racks now has two moneyballs, with the first and fifth balls being valued as two points. This was a departure from the previous years' feature of having an "all-moneyball rack". This also increased the maximum possible points to 35 from 34.

Contestants
Pos.	Player	Team	Height	Weight	First round	Final round
G	James Yap	Rain or Shine Elasto Painters	6–3	205	24	24
G	Stanley Pringle	GlobalPort Batang Pier	6–1	185	22	21
G	Terrence Romeo	TNT KaTropa	5–11	178	23	16
G	Ronald Tubid	Columbian Dyip	6–1	185	20	did not advance
G	Matthew Wright	Phoenix Fuel Masters	6–4	200	20	did not advance
G	LA Tenorio	Barangay Ginebra San Miguel	5–8	150	19	did not advance
G	Paul Lee	Magnolia Hotshots Pambansang Manok	6–0	200	17	did not advance
G	Marcio Lassiter	San Miguel Beermen	6–2	185	16	did not advance
G	JVee Casio	Alaska Aces	5–10	175	15	did not advance
F	KG Canaleta	Meralco Bolts	6–6	200	15	did not advance
G	Larry Fonacier	NLEX Road Warriors	6–2	170	13	did not advance
G	Allein Maliksi	Blackwater Elite	6–4	180	11	did not advance

- Gold represent current champion.

=== Slam Dunk Contest ===
This year's contest only featured four judges instead of the traditional five.

Contestants
Pos.	Player	Team	Height	Weight	First round	Final round
G	Rey Guevarra	Phoenix Fuel Masters	6–3	190	75 (35+40)	115 (39+36+40)
G	Renz Palma	Blackwater Elite	6–0		77 (37+40)	114 (39+36+39)
G	Chris Newsome	Meralco Bolts	6–2	190	72 (34+38)	did not advance
F	Matt Ganuelas-Rosser	San Miguel Beermen	6–5	186	69 (37+32)	did not advance
F	Lervin Flores	GlobalPort Batang Pier	6–5		59 (28+31)	did not advance
F	Marion Magat	Alaska Aces	6–7	180	52 (25+27)	did not advance

- Gold represent the current champion.

=== Shooting Stars Challenge ===
Team Name	Time
Team Paul Lee	38.8
Team Marcio Lassiter	1:01.4
Team LA Tenorio	2:00.0

=== All-Star Game ===
==== Roster ====
PBA Luzon All-Stars
Pos	Player	Team	No. of selections
Starters
F	Calvin Abueva	Alaska Aces	6
F/C	Japeth Aguilar	Barangay Ginebra San Miguel	6
G	LA Tenorio	Barangay Ginebra San Miguel	8
G	Paul Lee	Magnolia Hotshots Pambansang Manok	7
F	Marc Pingris^{INJ1}	Magnolia Hotshots Pambansang Manok	14
G	Jayson Castro^{ST1}	TNT KaTropa	6
Reserves
G	Stanley Pringle	GlobalPort Batang Pier	4
G/F	Matthew Wright	Phoenix Fuel Masters	2
G/F	Marcio Lassiter	San Miguel Beermen	5
G	Alex Cabagnot	San Miguel Beermen	6
F	Arwind Santos	San Miguel Beermen	10
F/C	Ian Sangalang^{INJ2}	Magnolia Hotshots Pambansang Manok	1
F/C	Raymond Almazan	Rain or Shine Elasto Painters	2
Head coach: Leo Austria (San Miguel Beermen)

Smart PBA All-Stars
Pos	Player	Team	No. of selections
Starters
C	June Mar Fajardo	San Miguel Beermen	6
G/F	Allein Maliksi	Blackwater Elite	2
G	Terrence Romeo	TNT KaTropa	3
F/C	Troy Rosario	TNT KaTropa	3
F/C	Roger Pogoy	TNT KaTropa	2
Reserves
F	Carl Bryan Cruz^{DNP1}	Alaska Aces	2
F	Mac Belo	Blackwater Elite	2
F/G	Gabe Norwood	Rain or Shine Elasto Painters	9
G	Jio Jalalon	Magnolia Hotshots Pambansang Manok	2
G	Kiefer Ravena^{DNP2}	NLEX Road Warriors	1
Head coach: Yeng Guiao (NLEX Road Warriors)

- ^INJ1 Marc Pingris was unable to participate due to an ACL injury.
- ^ST1 Jayson Castro started in place of Marc Pingris.
- ^INJ2 Ian Sangalang was unable to participate due to a wrist injury.
- ^DNP1 Carl Bryan Cruz was unable to participate.
- ^DNP2 Kiefer Ravena was unable to participate.

=== Game ===
ESPN 5

May 25
8:00pm

Box score

PBA Luzon All-Stars 149, Smart PBA All-Stars 152
Scoring by quarter: 38–47, 32–39, 36–35, 43–31
Pts: Aguilar 43; Rebs: Abueva 16; Asts: Castro 8	Pts: Romeo 48; Rebs: Fajardo 14; Asts: Romeo 11

Batangas City Coliseum, Batangas City
Referees: P. Balao, E. Tangkion, R. Gruta, R. Yante, J. Nicandro

- All-Star Luzon Leg MVP: Terrence Romeo (Smart PBA)

== Visayas leg ==
=== Shooting Stars Challenge ===
Team Name	Time
Team Emman Monfort	1:42
Team Jericho Cruz	1:55
Team Ronald Tubid	2:00

=== All-Star Game ===
==== Roster ====
PBA Visayas All-Stars
Pos	Player	Team	No. of selections
Starters
C	Greg Slaughter	Barangay Ginebra San Miguel	4
C	June Mar Fajardo	San Miguel Beermen	6
G	James Yap	Rain or Shine Elasto Painters	15
G	Terrence Romeo	TNT KaTropa	3
G	Kiefer Ravena^{DNP1}	NLEX Road Warriors	1
G	Chris Ross^{ST1}	San Miguel Beermen	4
Reserves
F	Joe Devance^{INJ2}	Barangay Ginebra San Miguel	7
G/F	Ronald Tubid^{REP2}	Columbian Dyip	9
G	Emman Monfort	NLEX Road Warriors	1
F/C	Asi Taulava	NLEX Road Warriors	16
G/F	Jeff Chan	Phoenix Fuel Masters	6
F/C	J. R. Quiñahan	NLEX Road Warriors	4
G	Jericho Cruz	TNT KaTropa	4
Head coach: Chito Victolero (Magnolia Hotshots Pambansang Manok)

Smart PBA All-Stars
Pos	Player	Team	No. of selections
Starters
F/C	Japeth Aguilar	Barangay Ginebra San Miguel	6
F	Calvin Abueva	Alaska Aces	6
F	Troy Rosario	TNT KaTropa	3
G/F	Matthew Wright	Phoenix Fuel Masters	2
G	Jio Jalalon	Magnolia Hotshots Pambansang Manok	2
Reserves
F	Carl Bryan Cruz^{DNP3}	Alaska Aces	2
F	Mac Belo	Blackwater Elite	2
G/F	Gabe Norwood	Rain or Shine Elasto Painters	9
G/F	Roger Pogoy	TNT KaTropa	2
G/F	Allein Maliksi^{DNP4}	Blackwater Elite	2
G	Jayson Castro	TNT KaTropa	6
Head coach: Nash Racela (TNT KaTropa)

- ^DNP1 Kiefer Ravena was unable to participate.
- ^ST1 Chris Ross started in place of Kiefer Ravena.
- ^INJ2 Joe Devance was unable to participate due to a knee injury.
- ^REP2 Ronald Tubid played in place of Joe Devance.
- ^DNP3 Carl Bryan Cruz was unable to participate.
- ^DNP4 Allein Maliksi was unable to participate due to an injury.

=== Game ===
ESPN 5

May 27
7:40pm

Box score

PBA Visayas All-Stars 157, Smart PBA All-Stars 141
Scoring by quarter: 33–36, 47–37, 35–30, 42–38
Pts: Chan 29; Rebs: Fajardo 18; Asts: Cruz 11	Pts: Abueva 41; Rebs: Abueva 27; Asts: Rosario, Wright 7

University of San Agustin Gym, Iloilo City
Referees: N. Quilinguen, S. Pineda, J. Narandan, M. Orioste

- All-Star Visayas Leg MVP: Jeff Chan (PBA Visayas)

== Logo making contest ==
The league launched a logo-making contest for the All-Star week on February 23, 2018. The winner of the contest will win an all-expense-paid trip for two to one of the All-Star week legs (Davao, Batangas or Iloilo).

On March 15, an entry by John Paul Limos was selected as the winner of the contest by a selection committee composed of Commissioner Willie Marcial, PBA Press Corps president Gerry Ramos and Magnolia Hotshots Pambansang Manok team manager Alvin Patrimonio. The winning entry however got disqualified the following day since the logo had a very similar look from the logo used by PlayPark All-Stars (an e-sports tournament).

On March 19, a new logo, designed by Jerome Allan Moreno was selected as the winner of the logo making contest.

== See also ==
- 2017–18 PBA season
- Philippine Basketball Association
- Philippine Basketball Association All-Star Weekend
