= Rey Guevarra =

Filipino basketball player

Personal information
- Born: November 24, 1986 (age 39) Parañaque, Philippines
- Listed height: 6 ft 3 in (1.91 m)
- Listed weight: 190 lb (86 kg)

Career information
- High school: Letran (Manila)
- College: Letran
- PBA draft: 2010: 1st round, 3rd overall pick
- Drafted by: Air21 Express
- Playing career: 2010–2019
- Position: Small forward / shooting guard

Career history
- 2010–2011: Air21 Express
- 2011–2012: San Miguel Beermen / Petron Blaze Boosters
- 2012: Powerade Tigers
- 2012–2013: GlobalPort Batang Pier
- 2013–2016: Meralco Bolts
- 2016–2017: Mahindra Floodbuster / Kia Picanto
- 2017–2018: Phoenix Fuel Masters
- 2018: Muntinlupa Cagers
- 2018–2019: Phoenix Pulse Fuel Masters

Career highlights
- PBA champion (2011 Governors'); 5× PBA All-Star Weekend Slam Dunk Contest champion (2014–2016, 2018, 2019); PBA Greats vs. Stalwarts Game MVP (2014); NCAA Philippines Sixth Man of the Year (2007); FIBA 3×3 World Tour Slam Dunk Contest champion (2015); PBL Unity Cup Slam Dunk Contest champion (2006); 2× UAAP-NCAA All Star Slam Dunk Contest champion (2005, 2007); 2× Adidas Streetball 3-on-3 Slam Dunk champion (2004–2005)

Rey Francis J. Guevarra (born November 24, 1986) is a Filipino former professional basketball player in the Philippine Basketball Association (PBA). Guevarra was selected by the Air21 Express third overall in the 2010 PBA draft. He is known for his great athleticism, and is one of the most athletic players in the PBA today, evidenced by him winning the PBA Slam Dunk Contest for three consecutive years, from 2014 (with Justin Melton) to 2016, then again from 2018–2019.

He also had a brief stint with the Smart Gilas national team under Serbian mentor Rajko Toroman.

== College career ==
Guevarra played college for Colegio de San Juan de Letran where he teamed up with future PBA players RJ Jazul and Bryan Faundo. Together, they led the Knights to a Finals appearance in 2007 before losing to rival San Beda Red Lions. On 2009, Guevarra injured his knee after a bad fall after colliding with San Beda center Sudan Daniel, which prevented him from playing with the Smart Gilas in the PBA and prematurely ended his college career.

== Professional career ==
=== Air21 Express ===
Guevarra was drafted by Air21 Express third overall in the 2010 PBA draft.

=== San Miguel Beermen / Petron Blaze Boosters ===
On March 2, 2011, Guevarra, along with Rabeh Al-Hussaini and Nonoy Baclao, the top three picks in the 2010 draft, was traded by Air21 to San Miguel Beermen for Danny Seigle, Dondon Hontiveros, Dorian Peña and Paul Artadi.

=== Powerade Tigers / GlobalPort Batang Pier ===
On April 20, 2012, him, Al-Hussaini and Lordy Tugade was traded by Petron Blaze (formerly San Miguel) to Powerade Tigers for Marcio Lassiter and Celino Cruz.

==== "The Fafa Dunk" ====
Guevarra was known as "Fafa Rey" for his good looks. With 11 seconds left during the 3rd quarter of Powerade Tigers (currently NorthPort Batang Pier) game against the Alaska Aces, Guevarra went coast-to-coast for a facial slam dunk over Aces import Jason Forte. Minutes later, he trended nationwide on Twitter.

=== Meralco Bolts ===
Guevarra, along with Vic Manuel, Josh Vanlandingham, and a 2015 first-round pick was traded by GlobalPort to the Meralco Bolts for Sol Mercado, Kelly Nabong, and Jaypee Belencion. In the 2014 PBA All-Star Week he won his first Slam Dunk Contest along with co-champion Justin Melton. Both of them had perfect scores in the final two rounds. He won two more Slam Dunk contests again in 2015 and 2016.

=== Mahindra Floodbuster/Kia Picanto ===
On October 28, 2016, Guevarra was traded back to Globalport for Joseph Yeo after Meralco lost in the 2016 Governor's Cup Finals. A month later he was in the free agent pool, but picked up by the Mahindra Floodbusters for a one-year deal.

=== Phoenix Fuel Masters ===
After failing to get a renewal with Kia, he signed a one-conference deal with the Phoenix Fuel Masters. In his time there, he won his 4th and 5th Slam Dunk titles in 2018 and 2019.

== PBA career statistics ==
Legend
GP	Games played	MPG	Minutes per game
FG%	Field-goal percentage	3P%	3-point field-goal percentage	FT%	Free-throw percentage
RPG	Rebounds per game	APG	Assists per game	SPG	Steals per game
BPG	Blocks per game	PPG	Points per game	**Bold**	Career high

=== Season-by-season averages ===
Year	Team	GP	MPG	FG%	3P%	FT%	RPG	APG	SPG	BPG	PPG
2010–11	Air21	29	8.9	.375	**1.000**	.696	1.2	.1	.2	.1	2.7
2010–11	San Miguel / Petron	29	8.9	.375	**1.000**	.696	1.2	.1	.2	.1	2.7
2011–12	Petron	25	**15.9**	**.437**	.143	.692	**1.6**	**.5**	.2	**.3**	**5.2**
2011–12	Powerade	25	**15.9**	**.437**	.143	.692	**1.6**	**.5**	.2	**.3**	**5.2**
2012–13	GlobalPort	**31**	13.0	.423	.241	.718	1.3	**.5**	**.3**	.1	5.0
2012–13	Meralco	**31**	13.0	.423	.241	.718	1.3	**.5**	**.3**	.1	5.0
2013–14	Meralco	28	8.4	.387	.188	.800	.9	.3	.2	.1	2.3
2014–15	Meralco	16	9.5	.283	.150	.800	1.3	.4	.1	.1	2.6
2015–16	Meralco	10	3.6	.231	.222	**.833**	.7	.3	.0	.0	1.3
2016–17	Mahindra	9	10.5	.286	.300	.600	1.1	.3	.2	.0	2.8
2017–18	Phoenix	8	3.7	.417	.333	.000	.5	.1	.1	.1	1.5
2019	Phoenix Pulse	10	4.5	.533	.455	.250	.5	.2	.0	.0	2.2
Career		166	10.0	.393	.248	.700	1.1	.3	.2	.1	3.2

== Personal life ==
Guevarra is married to Nisa Guevarra (nee de Cataluna). They married in 2014.
