= 2003 PBA All-Star Weekend =

Philippine basketball exhibition

Governors' All-Stars	Commissioner's All-Stars
124	122
	1	2	3	4	Total
Governors' All-Stars	26	34	38	26	124
Commissioner's All-Stars	34	27	27	34	122
- Date: May 30 - June 1, 2003
- Venue: Araneta Coliseum, Quezon City
- MVP: Vergel Meneses
- Network: NBN/IBC

The 2003 PBA All-Star Weekend was the annual all-star weekend of the Philippine Basketball Association (PBA)'s 2003 PBA season. The events were held from May 30 to June 1, 2003 at the Araneta Coliseum, Cubao, Quezon City.

== Skills challenge ==
=== 2-Ball Challenge ===
Name	First round	Championship
Aries Dimaunahan, Sunday Salvacion	74	67
Danny Ildefonso, Dondon Hontiveros	71	66
Jeffrey Cariaso, William Antonio	53	
Mike Hrabak, Tony dela Cruz	53	
Gerald Francisco, Jomar Tierra	44	
Noy Castillo, Kerby Raymundo	38	
Gherome Ejercito, John Ferriols	28	
Patrick Fran, Victor Pablo	27	
Rob Duat, Don Allado	24	
Lordy Tugade, Enrico Villanueva	7	

=== Three-point shootout ===
Name	First round	Championship
Jimmy Alapag	15	18
Ren-Ren Ritualo	14	8
Olsen Racela	13	6
Dondon Hontiveros	10	
Brandon Cablay	9	
Don Camaso	9	
Niño Canaleta	13	
Willie Miller	8	
Boyet Fernandez	8	

=== Obstacle Challenge ===
Time in seconds.

Name	First round	Championship
Rob Johnson	27.3	32
Willie Miller	31.7	40.6
Jimmy Alapag	32.9	
Leo Avenido	35.2	
Gilbert Demape	36.3	
Boybits Victoria	38.3	
Rensy Bajar	38.8	
Jason Webb	41.4	
Egay Billones	42.6	
Mike Cortez	47.0	

=== Slam Dunk competition ===
Name	First round	Championship
Brandon Cablay	97	50
Ronald Tubid	88	
Sunday Salvacion	69	
Rafi Reavis	95	
Omanzie Rodriguez	77	
Billy Mamaril	95	
Lordy Tugade	89	
Joey Mente	97	48
Ronald Tubid	71	
Kahi Villa	50	

== Crispa-Toyota reunion game ==
=== Rosters ===
Crispa Redmanizers

- Romulo Mamaril
- Mon Cruz
- Bay Cristobal
- Philip Cezar
- Atoy Co
- Bernie Fabiosa
- Abet Guidaben
- Bogs Adornado
- Freddie Hubalde
- Rey Pages
- Willy Tanduyan
- Rey Franco
- Bong Dela Cruz
- Tito Varela
- Joy Dionisio
- Itoy Esguerra
- Dave Brodett
- Coach: Baby Dalupan

Toyota Tamaraws

- Terry Saldaña
- Chito Loyzaga
- Ed Cordero
- Sonny Jaworski
- Ramon Fernandez
- Gil Cortez
- Emer Legaspi
- Pol Herrera
- Boy Clarino
- Tino Reynoso
- Orly Bauzon
- Oscar Rocha
- Rolly Marcelo
- Ulysses Rodriguez
- Ed Camus
- Ompong Segura
- Coach: Dante Silverio

=== Game ===
NBN/IBC

May 30

Toyota Tamaraws 65, Crispa Redmanizers 61
Scoring by quarter: 16–14, 18–11, 13–17, 18–19
Terry Saldaña was named the game's most valuable player.

Araneta Coliseum, Quezon City

== All-star game ==
=== Rosters ===
Commissioner's All-Stars:

- Willie Miller (Red Bull)
- Jimmy Alapag (Talk 'N Text)
- Eric Menk (Brgy. Ginebra)
- Asi Taulava (Talk 'N Text)
- Jeffrey Cariaso (Coca-Cola)
- Chris Calaguio (Sta. Lucia)
- Lordy Tugade (Red Bull)
- Rudy Hatfield (Coca-Cola)
- Chris Jackson (Shell)
- Mick Pennisi (Red Bull)
- Enrico Villanueva (Red Bull)
- Coach: Yeng Guiao (Red Bull)

Governors' All-Stars:

- Kenneth Duremdes (Sta. Lucia)
- John Arigo (Alaska)
- Danny Ildefonso (San Miguel)
- Vergel Meneses (FedEx)
- Marlou Aquino (Sta. Lucia)
- Dondon Hontiveros (San Miguel)
- Olsen Racela (San Miguel)
- Kerby Raymundo (Purefoods)
- Dennis Espino (Sta. Lucia)
- Mike Cortez (Alaska)
- Don Allado (Alaska)
- Nic Belasco (San Miguel)
- Coach: Derrick Pumaren (FedEx)

=== Game ===
NBN/IBC

June 1
6:30 p.m.

Commissioner's All-Stars 122, Governors' All-Stars 124
Scoring by quarter: 34–26, 27–34, 27–38, 34–26
Pts: Eric Menk 34	Pts: Vergel Meneses 27
Vergel Meneses named the game's most valuable player, his 4th All-Star Game MVP award.

Araneta Coliseum, Quezon City
