= 2010 PBA All-Star Weekend =

North All-Stars	South All-Stars
133	130
	1	2	3	4	Total
North All-Stars	38	38	28	29	133
South All-Stars	39	30	32	29	130
- Date: April 22–25, 2010
- Venue: Puerto Princesa Coliseum, Puerto Princesa, Palawan
- MVP: Gabe Norwood
- Network: Solar TV; Basketball TV (BTV)

The 2010 PBA All-Star Weekend was the annual all-star weekend of the Philippine Basketball Association (PBA)'s 2009–10 PBA season. The events were held from April 22 to 25, 2010 at the Puerto Princesa Coliseum, Puerto Princesa, Palawan. This was the first time that the PBA gave its hosting rights to the province of Palawan.

== Friday events ==
=== Obstacle Challenge ===
Time in seconds.

Name	First round	Championship
Jonas Villanueva	32.8	31.7
Willie Miller	32.0	34.7
Ronjay Buenafe	31.7	37.1
Cyrus Baguio	39.8	
Jojo Duncil	40.3	
Solomon Mercado	43.4	
Josh Urbiztondo	44.3	
Jared Dillinger	46.4	
Chris Ross	57.2	
Paul Artadi	57.1	

=== Three-point shootout ===
Name	First round	Championship
Mark Macapagal	16	13
Jeff Chan	16	12
Yousif Aljamal	19	11
Renren Ritualo	14	
Ronald Tubid	14	
Dondon Hontiveros	15	
Jimmy Alapag	13	
James Yap	7	
Willie Miller	12	
Josh Urbiztondo	15	

=== Slam Dunk competition ===
Name	Score	Type
Niño Canaleta	95	
Kelly Williams	94	

Failed to qualify: Gabe Norwood, JC Intal, and Rico Maierhofer

=== Rookie-Sophomore Blitz Game ===
==== Rosters ====
Rookies:

- Rogemar Menor (Barako Bull)
- Marvin Cruz (Coca-Cola)
- Josh Urbiztondo (Sta. Lucia)
- Chris Ross (Coca-Cola)
- Ronnie Matias (Air21)
- Chris Timberlake (Derby Ace)
- Marcy Arellano (Rain or Shine)
- Mike Burtscher (Alaska)
- Coach:

Sophomores:

- Beau Belga (Air21)
- Mark Borboran (Alaska)
- Jeffrei Chan (Rain or Shine)
- Jared Dillinger (Talk 'N Text)
- Kelvin Gregorio (Sta. Lucia)
- Ryan Reyes (Sta. Lucia)
- Larry Rodriguez (Coca-Cola)
- Mark Yee (Talk 'N Text)
- Coach: Luigi Trillo (Alaska)

==== Game ====
Solar TV / Basketball TV

April 23

Rookies 86, Sophomores 106
Scoring by quarter: 17-20, 31-20, 10-30, 29-36
Pts: Buenafe 25, Lanete 17, Cruz 14, Devance 14, Bono 10, Aljamal 8, Kramer 7, Eman 6.	Pts: Menor 19, Cruz 18, Urbiztondo 17, Ross 11, Marias 9, Timberlake 7, Arellano 6, Burtscher 0.
Jared Dillinger named the game's most valuable player.

Puerto Princesa Coliseum, Puerto Princesa, Palawan

In the game, there were four 10-minute quarters, the 8-second rule was lessened into 6 seconds, the shot clock was cut into 18 seconds, and a slam dunk counted for three points.

== Sunday events ==
=== Legends Shootout ===
Active players	Score		Legends
Jeff Chan	10	19	Alvin Patrimonio
Mark Macapagal	10	19	Ruehl Gomez
Yousif Aljamal	10	10	Kenneth Duremdes
Total	30	48	Total

=== All-Star Game ===
==== Rosters ====
The rosters for the All-Star Game were chosen in two ways. The starters were chosen via a fan ballot (online and at the venue during PBA games). Players are assigned to represent the North or South All-Star teams based from their place of birth. Players born in Luzon are assigned to the North All-Stars team while players born in Visayas and Mindanao are assigned to represent the South All-Stars. If the player is born outside the Philippines, the player is assigned to his parents' birthplace. Two guards and three frontcourt players who received the highest vote were named the All-Star starters. The reserves are voted by the ten PBA coaches after the results of the fan ballot are released.

North All-Stars:

Starters

- Marc Pingris (B-Meg Derby Ace)
- Gabe Norwood (Rain or Shine)
- JC Intal (Brgy. Ginebra)
- Paul Artadi (B-Meg Derby Ace)
- Jayjay Helterbrand (Brgy. Ginebra)

Reserves

- Mark Cardona (Talk 'N Text)
- Ranidel de Ocampo (Talk 'N Text)
- Rico Maierhofer (B-Meg Derby Ace)
- Solomon Mercado (Rain or Shine)
- Willie Miller (Brgy. Ginebra)
- Ryan Reyes (Talk 'N Text)
- Arwind Santos (San Miguel)
- Coach: Ryan Gregorio (B-Meg Derby Ace)

South All-Stars:

Starters

- Asi Taulava (Coca-Cola)
- Eric Menk (Brgy. Ginebra)
- Kelly Williams (Talk 'N Text)
- Cyrus Baguio (Alaska)
- James Yap (B-Meg Derby Ace)

Reserves

- Jimmy Alapag (Talk 'N Text)
- Joe Devance (Alaska)
- Dondon Hontiveros (San Miguel)
- Reynel Hugnatan (Alaska)
- Sonny Thoss (Alaska)
- Ronald Tubid (Brgy. Ginebra)
- Roger Yap (B-Meg Derby Ace)
- Coach: Tim Cone (Alaska)

==== Game ====
Solar TV / Basketball TV

April 27
6:30 p.m.

North All-Stars 133, South All-Stars 130
Scoring by quarter: 38–39, 38–30, 28–32, 29–29
Pts: Mark Cardona 20	Pts: Kelly Williams 17
Gabe Norwood named the game's most valuable player.

Puerto Princesa Coliseum, Puerto Princesa, Palawan

== See also ==
- 2009–10 PBA season
