= 2000 PBA All-Star Weekend =

2000 PBA All-Star Game
Rookies-Sophomores-Juniors	Veterans
78	93
- Date: August 13, 2000
- Venue: San Agustin Gym, Iloilo City
- Network: PBA on Vintage Sports

The 2000 PBA All-Star Game is the annual All-Star Weekend of the Philippine Basketball Association (PBA). The first out-of-town All-Star game was held on August 13, 2000 at the San Agustin Gym in Iloilo City.

== PBA All-Stars vs ABC Selection ==
A week before the PBA Annual All-Star game, an exhibition match took place on August 6 at the Philsports Arena, featuring a PBA selection going up against the Asia's finest, some of the best players in the Asian Basketball Confederation. The PBA All-Stars won easily, 101-81. Johnny Abarrientos was voted MVP of the ABC-PBA All-Star Extravaganza.

=== Rosters ===
PBA All-Stars:

- Johnny Abarrientos
- Marlou Aquino
- Noy Castillo
- Kenneth Duremdes
- Rudy Hatfield
- Bong Hawkins
- Danny Ildefonso
- Eric Menk
- Alvin Patrimonio
- Rodney Santos
- Andy Seigle
- Danny Seigle
- Coach: Tim Cone

ABC Selection:

- Rommel Adducul (From Manila Metrostars in the MBA)
- Gong Xiaobin (China)
- Zhu Dong (China)
- Cheng Chi Lung (Taiwan)
- Eli McHantaf (Lebanon)
- Fadi El Khatib (Lebanon)
- Mohamed Islau-Ud-Din (India)
- R.S. Robinson (India)
- Osamah Mubarak (Kuwait)
- Lo Shin Liang (Taiwan)
- Makoto Hasegawa (Japan)
- Ali Al-Maghrabi (Saudi Arabia)
- Coach: Ghassan Sarkis (Lebanon)

=== Game ===
Viva TV

August 6

PBA All-Stars 101, ABC Selection 81

PhilSports Arena, Pasig, Metro Manila

== PBA-ABC Side Attraction ==
- Slam Dunk Competition: Mobiline's Don Camaso won over Indian R.S Robinson in the finals, 45-43.
- Buzzerbeater event: Edward Naron of Brgy.Ginebra scored on a lay-up in the finals to outshoot Mobiline's Patrick Fran and Purefoods' Jessie Cabanayan.
- Three-Point Shootout: Purefoods guard Boyet Fernandez edged out Chinese-Taipei's Lo Shin Liang, 21-19, in the finals.
- Two-Ball Competition: Mobiline's Victor Pablo and Gherome Ejercito prevailed by scoring 64 points in the finals against the 39 points of the Purefoods tandem of Rey Evangelista and Rommel Daep.

== All-Star Game ==
=== Rosters ===
Veterans:

- Marlou Aquino (Sta.Lucia)
- Jeffrey Cariaso (Tanduay)
- Kenneth Duremdes (Alaska)
- Vergel Meneses (Brgy.Ginebra)
- Benjie Paras (Shell)
- Alvin Patrimonio (Purefoods)
- Olsen Racela (San Miguel)
- Rodney Santos (Alaska)
- Coach: Alfrancis Chua (Tanduay)

Rookies-Sophomores-Juniors:

- Gherome Ejercito (Mobiline)
- Davonn Harp (Red Bull)
- Rudy Hatfield (Tanduay)
- Dondon Hontiveros (Tanduay)
- Danny Ildefonso (San Miguel)
- Eric Menk (Tanduay)
- Ali Peek (Sunkist)
- Mark Telan (Shell)
- Jimwell Torion (Red Bull)
- Coach:

=== Game ===
Viva TV

August 13

Veterans 93, Rookies-Sophomores-Juniors 78

San Agustin Gym, Iloilo City

The Veterans unleashed an unbelievable 25-0 run in the last eight minutes to turn back the RSJ squad, 93-78. Vergel Meneses was named the MVP of the All-Star Game, his third MVP award in the mid-season spectacle.
