= 2005 PBA All-Star Weekend =

North All-Stars	South All-Stars
131	128
- Date: November 25–26, 2005
- Venue: Ilocos Norte Centennial Arena, Laoag
- MVP: Jayjay Helterbrand (Barangay Ginebra Kings)
- Network: ABC

The 2005 PBA All-Star Weekend was the annual all-star weekend of the Philippine Basketball Association (PBA)'s 2005–06 season. This was the first all-star game for the 2005–06 season, as the league is adjusting its season calendar. The events were held at the Ilocos Norte Centennial Arena in Laoag, Ilocos Norte.

== Side events ==
=== Skills challenge winners ===
Three-point shootout: Jimmy Alapag of Talk 'N Text, winning over Renren Ritualo of Air21 and Dondon Hontiveros of San Miguel in the finale. Other entries were James Yap of Purefoods, Jeffrey Cariaso of Alaska, Lordy Tugade of Red Bull, Sunday Salvacion of Barangay Ginebra, Dale Singson of Coca-Cola, Ronald Tubid of Air21, and Cesar Catli of Sta.Lucia.

Trick shot competition: Paolo Hubalde (San Miguel)

Obstacle challenge: Topex Robinson (Red Bull Barako)

Slam Dunk contest: Niño Canaleta (Air21), winning against Enrico Villanueva of Red Bull Barako.

Legends shootout competition: The trio of Alvin Patrimonio, Ronnie Magsanoc and Frankie Lim, won 41–39, over Renren Ritualo, Dondon Hontiveros and Jimmy Alapag.

=== Rookies vs Sophomores ===
ABC

November 25

Rookies 106, Sophomores 122
Nelbert Omolon of Sta.Lucia scored 37 points and was named the game's MVP.

Ilocos Norte Centennial Arena, Laoag

== All-Star Game ==
=== Coaches ===
Ryan Gregorio, coach of the Purefoods Chunkee Giants, and Joel Banal, coach of the Talk 'N Text Phone Pals, were selected as the North and the South head coach, respectively.

=== Roster ===
North All-Stars
Pos	Player	Team	No. of selections	Votes
Starters
G	Mark Caguioa	Barangay Ginebra Kings	3	
G	Jayjay Helterbrand	Barangay Ginebra Kings	1	
C	Rommel Adducul	Barangay Ginebra Kings	2	
F	Marc Pingris	Purefoods Chunkee Giants	1	
F	Kerby Raymundo	Purefoods Chunkee Giants	4	
Reserves
F/C	Enrico Villanueva	Red Bull Barako	3	—
F	Rich Alvarez	Alaska Aces	2	—
F	Tony dela Cruz	Alaska Aces	1	—
G	Renren Ritualo	Air21 Express	1	—
G	Brandon Cablay	San Miguel Beermen	1	—
G	Jeffrey Cariaso	Alaska Aces	10	—
C	Billy Mamaril	Coca-Cola Tigers	1	—
Head coach: Ryan Gregorio (Purefoods Chunkee Giants)

South All-Stars
Pos	Player	Team	No. of selections	Votes
Starters
G	James Yap	Purefoods Chunkee Giants	2	
G	Jimmy Alapag	Talk 'N Text Phone Pals	3	
C	Asi Taulava	Talk 'N Text Phone Pals	5	
F	Danny Seigle	San Miguel Beermen	4	
F	Eric Menk	Barangay Ginebra Kings	5	
Reserves
C	Sonny Thoss	Alaska Aces	2	—
F	Reynel Hugnatan	Alaska Aces	1	—
G	Cyrus Baguio	Red Bull Barako	1	—
G	Roger Yap	Purefoods Chunkee Giants	1	—
G	Dondon Hontiveros	San Miguel Beermen	5	—
G	Ronald Tubid	Air21 Express	2	—
F	John Ferriols	Air21 Express	2	—
Head coach: Joel Banal (Talk 'N Text Phone Pals)

=== Game ===
ABC

November 26
5:00pm

North All-Stars 131, South All-Stars 128
Jayjay Helterband was named as the game's MVP.

Ilocos Norte Centennial Arena, Laoag

== See also ==
- 2005–06 PBA season
- Philippine Basketball Association
- Philippine Basketball Association All-Star Weekend
