= 2007 PBA All-Star Weekend =

North All-Stars	South All-Stars
145	142
	1	2	3	4	Total
North All-Stars	31	48	35	31	145
South All-Stars	48	36	25	33	142
- Date: April 25–29, 2007
- Venue: University of Baguio Gym, Baguio
- MVP: Jayjay Helterbrand / Willie Miller
- Attendance: 4000
- Network: Associated Broadcasting Company (ABC)

The 2007 PBA All-Star Weekend was the annual all-star weekend of the Philippine Basketball Association (PBA)'s 2006–07 PBA season. The events were held at the Pacoy Ortega Gym, San Fernando City, La Union and at the University of Baguio Gym, Baguio.

== Thursday events ==
=== Obstacle Challenge ===
Time in seconds.

Name	First round	Championship
Willie Miller	33	30
Gary David	33	31
Denok Miranda	33	50
Alex Cabagnot	30	50
Topex Robinson	35	
LA Tenorio	38	
Jayjay Helterbrand	39	
Jimmy Alapag	40	
Jireh Ibañes	48	
Roger Yap	51	

=== Shooting Stars Challenge ===
Jayjay Helterbrand, Dominic Uy and San Fernando City councilor Panding Nince def. Mick Pennisi, Richard del Rosario and councilor Pablo Ortega.

=== Trick Shot Challenge ===
Dennis Miranda def. Ranidel de Ocampo and Ronald Tubid.

=== Three-point shootout ===
Name	First round	Championship
Dondon Hontiveros	16	16
Willie Miller	19	15
Gary David	15	14
Mark Caguioa	15	12
Larry Fonacier	14	
Kerby Raymundo	13	
Renren Ritualo	11	
Niño Gelig	6	

Hontiveros, Miller and David qualified for the Legends Shootout.

=== Slam Dunk competition ===
Name	Score	Type
Niño Canaleta	79	Free-throw line leap, windmill
Jay Washington	54	

Failed to qualify: Kelly Williams, Gabby Espinas, Aaron Aban, Ronald Tubid

=== Rookie-Sophomore Blitz Game ===
ABC

April 26

Rookies 122, Sophomores 107
Pts: Santos 31, Tenorio 18, Reyes 17, Andaya 17, Yeo 13, Espinas 13, Ibañes 11, Aban 2	Pts: Washington 28, Canaleta 25, Macapagal 23, Bugia 8, Miranda 8, Cabagnot 7, Najorda 6, Holper 2
Arwind Santos was named the game's most valuable player.

Pacoy Ortega Gym, San Fernando City, La Union
Attendance: 4,000+

In the game, there were four 10-minute quarters, the 8-second rule was lessened into 6 seconds, the shot clock was cut into 18 seconds, and a slam dunk counted for three points.

== Sunday events ==
=== Legends Shootout ===
Active players	Score		Legends
Gary David	16	13	Ato Agustin
Willie Miller	20	6	Pido Jarencio
Dondon Hontiveros	13	16	Ato Agustin
Total	49	35	Total

=== All-Star Game ===
==== Rosters ====
North All-Stars:

- Rommel Adducul (San Miguel)
- John Arigo (Coca-Cola)
- Mark Cardona (Talk 'N Text)
- Mark Caguioa (Barangay Ginebra)
- Gary David (Air21)
- Ranidel de Ocampo (Air21)
- Larry Fonacier (Red Bull)
- Danny Ildefonso (San Miguel)
- Jayjay Helterbrand (Barangay Ginebra)
- Kerby Raymundo (Purefoods)
- Enrico Villanueva (Red Bull)
- Willie Miller (Alaska)
- Coach: Jong Uichico (Barangay Ginebra)

South All-Stars:

- Jimmy Alapag (Talk 'N Text)
- Cyrus Baguio (Red Bull)
- Tony dela Cruz (Alaska)
- Dondon Hontiveros (San Miguel)
- Sunday Salvacion (Barangay Ginebra)
- Danny Seigle (San Miguel)
- Asi Taulava (Talk 'N Text)
- Sonny Thoss (Alaska)
- Ronald Tubid (Barangay Ginebra)
- Kelly Williams (Sta. Lucia)
- Roger Yap (Purefoods)
- James Yap (Purefoods)
- Coach: Tim Cone (Alaska)

==== Game ====
ABC

April 29

South All-Stars 142, North All-Stars 145
Scoring by quarter: 48–31, 36–48, 25–35, 33–31
Pts: Kelly Williams 28; Rebs: Kelly Williams 10	Pts: Helterbrand 25; Rebs: Miller 12; Asts: Willie Miller 10
Jayjay Helterbrand and Willie Miller named the game's co-most valuable players.

University of Baguio Gym, Baguio
Attendance: 4,000

The All Star Game started with a crazy dance by the South All-Stars. The addition of the three point dunk added to the output of the highest scoring (half-time) in PBA all-star history. The South led by as much as 20 points in the game only to be defeated by the North All-Stars, the trend wherein the host always win has not yet been broken.
