= Josh Urbiztondo =

Filipino-American basketball player

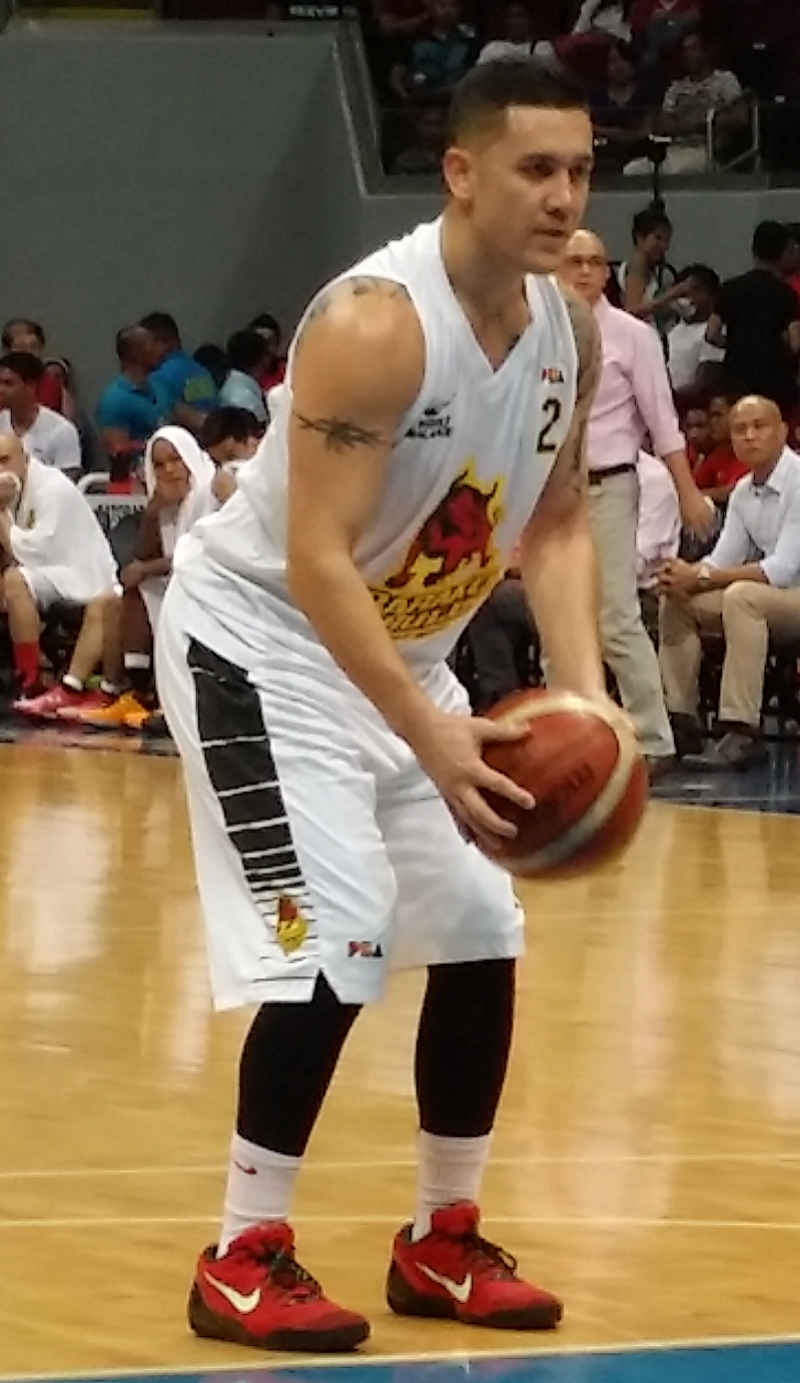
- Urbiztondo with Barako Bull in 2015

Personal information
- Born: February 27, 1983 (age 43) San Francisco, California, U.S.
- Listed height: 6 ft 0 in (1.83 m)
- Listed weight: 185 lb (84 kg)

Career information
- High school: Hillsdale (San Mateo, California)
- College: Foothill College (2002–2004); Fresno Pacific (2004–2006)
- PBA draft: 2009: Undrafted
- Playing career: 2009–2019
- Position: Point guard / shooting guard

Career history
- 2009–2010: Sta. Lucia Realtors
- 2010–2011: Air21 Express
- 2011–2012: B-Meg Llamados
- 2012–2013: Barako Bull Energy Cola
- 2013–2015: Barangay Ginebra San Miguel
- 2015–2016: Barako Bull Energy
- 2016: Phoenix Fuel Masters
- 2016–2017: GlobalPort Batang Pier
- 2017: Singapore Slingers
- 2017: GlobalPort Batang Pier
- 2017–2019: San Miguel Alab Pilipinas

Career highlights
- PBA champion (2012 Commissioner's); PBA All-Star (2012); PBA All-Rookie Team (2010); ABL champion (2018); PBL Defensive Player of the Year (2009)

Joshua Emile Doherty Urbiztondo (born February 27, 1983) is a Filipino-American former professional basketball player. He last played for the San Miguel Alab Pilipinas of the ASEAN Basketball League (ABL).

== Amateur career ==
Urbiztondo played for Fresno-Pacific University in his final years of college. It was there where he gained a reputation as a scorer.

In the summer of 2008, Urbiztondo left the States to play in the PBA D-League. There, he led his team to a championship victory, got named to the "Top Five Mythical Team", was named Top Defensive Player, was the consensus number one performer, and was poised to be a high pick in the upcoming PBA Draft.

== PBA career ==
=== Sta. Lucia Realtors ===
In 2009, Urbiztondo entered the draft for the PBA, but was not selected. He was later signed by the Sta. Lucia Realtors. In 2010, the Realtors were replaced by the Meralco Bolts. In August 2010, the newly founded team gave away Urbiztondo and its number 3 pick in the 2010 PBA draft to the Air21 Express, in a three-way deal that brought Mark Cardona to the Bolts.

=== Air 21 Express ===
In 2011, he earned the nickname "Fireball" after going for 31 points in a game while playing for Air21.

=== B-Meg Llamados ===
In 2011 Urbiztondo was signed by the B-Meg Llamados. He competed in the three-point shootout during the 2012 All-Star Weekend (losing to Mark Macapagal) and was named an All-Star that year. During the 2012 Commissioner's Cup finals, he was fined 2,400 pesos for exchanging elbows with Pamboy Raymundo. The Llamados eventually won the series, giving him his only PBA title. Later that year, that team was renamed as the San Mig Coffee Mixers, who then sent him to the Barako Bull Energy Cola in exchange for a first-round pick in the next year.

=== Barako Bull Energy Cola ===
He suffered a hamstring injury in his time there. He won a Player of the Week award before he was traded to Ginebra.

=== Barangay Ginebra San Miguel ===
In 2013, prior to the Commissioner's Cup playoffs, Urbiztondo was dealt to Barangay Ginebra San Miguel.

In 2014, he missed some games due to a back spasm.

On August 25, 2015, he along with Jens Knuttel was traded to the Barako Bull Energy for Nico Salva and a future first-round pick.

=== Return to Barako Bull franchise ===
In a game against the Bolts during the 2015–16 Philippine Cup, Urbiztondo scored 13 of his 24 points in the fourth quarter to give Barako Bull the win. He also had 3 rebounds, 3 steals, and 2 assists in that game. Before the start of the 2016–17 season, he, along with young point guard Mark Cruz, were released from the team.

=== Globalport Batang Pier ===
Urbiztondo was then signed by the Globalport Batang Pier, who had to relegate Karl Dehesa to the reserve list to make room for him. He played in only eight games for them in the Philippine Cup before being released.

After the ABL season, Urbiztondo was signed once again by Globalport, who needed his services after loaning Terrence Romeo to the national team. This would be his last time playing for a PBA team.

== ABL career ==
=== Singapore Slingers ===
After his first stint with Globalport, Urbiztondo became the Heritage Import of the Singapore Slingers. The Slingers made it to the 2017 finals. In game 1, he hit a finals-record seven three-pointers, breaking the previous record of five. He had 23 points in that game, and the Slingers won that game. But then they lost the next three games, and the Hong Kong Eastern Long Lions won the championship.

=== Alab Pilipinas ===
Urbiztondo returned to the ABL to play for Alab Pilipinas, which he had defeated in the semis the previous year. His team won the 2017–18 title over the Mono Vampire. The team failed to defend the title the following season, losing to the Hong Kong Eastern Basketball in the quarterfinals. At the end of that season, Urbiztondo announced his retirement from basketball.

== Personal life ==
His father is Filipino and his mother is American. He is currently an assistant coach for the San Joaquin Memorial High School basketball team.

== PBA career statistics ==
Legend
GP	Games played	MPG	Minutes per game
FG%	Field-goal percentage	3P%	3-point field-goal percentage	FT%	Free-throw percentage
RPG	Rebounds per game	APG	Assists per game	SPG	Steals per game
BPG	Blocks per game	PPG	Points per game	**Bold**	Career high

=== Season-by-season averages ===
Year	Team	GP	MPG	FG%	3P%	FT%	RPG	APG	SPG	BPG	PPG
2009–10	Sta. Lucia	37	21.8	.368	.308	.809	2.8	2.6	**1.1**	.0	7.8
2010–11	Air21	43	17.6	.387	.362	.838	2.6	3.1	.5	**.1**	6.1
2011–12	B-Meg	**62**	**25.8**	**.397**	.321	.653	**3.3**	2.9	.9	.0	6.9
2012–13	Barako Bull	44	25.2	.342	.323	.674	2.8	**3.7**	**1.1**	.0	8.3
2012–13	Barangay Ginebra	44	25.2	.342	.323	.674	2.8	**3.7**	**1.1**	.0	8.3
2013–14	Barangay Ginebra	29	10.6	.337	.292	.333	1.4	.7	.5	.0	2.9
2014–15	Barangay Ginebra	23	13.0	.330	.298	**.923**	2.0	1.4	**1.1**	.0	4.0
2015–16	Barako Bull	32	19.5	.367	**.370**	.651	2.0	2.1	.8	**.1**	**9.4**
2015–16	Phoenix	32	19.5	.367	**.370**	.651	2.0	2.1	.8	**.1**	**9.4**
2016–17	GlobalPort	9	7.8	.150	.214	—	.9	1.0	.4	.0	1.0
Career		279	20.0	.365	.328	.715	2.5	2.5	.9	.0	6.6

== ABL career statistics ==
=== Season-by-season averages ===
Year	Team	GP	MPG	FG%	3P%	FT%	RPG	APG	SPG	BPG	PPG
2016–17	Singapore Slingers	10	28.2	.36	.35	.85	4.5	2.6	.7	.0	11.3
2017–18	San Miguel Alab Pilipinas	26	22.8	.41	.41	.88	3.4	2.8	.9	.0	8.2
2018–19	San Miguel Alab Pilipinas	28	16.3	.37	.35	.80	3.0	2.4	.7	.0	5.4
