= Joey Mente =

Filipino basketball player (1976–2018)

Personal information
- Born: February 24, 1976 Capul, Northern Samar, Philippines
- Died: August 22, 2018 (aged 42) Samar, Philippines
- Listed height: 5 ft 9 in (1.75 m)
- Listed weight: 180 lb (82 kg)

Career information
- College: Lyceum
- PBA draft: 2001: 1st round, 10th overall pick
- Drafted by: San Miguel Beermen
- Playing career: 1998–2008

Career history
- 1998–2000: Iloilo Volts/Megavoltz
- 2001–2005: San Miguel Beermen
- 2006–2008: Welcoat Dragons

Career highlights
- PBA Slam Dunk champion (2001)

Joey Mente (February 24, 1976 – August 22, 2018) was a Filipino professional basketball player in the Philippine Basketball Association who last played for the Welcoat Dragons. He was drafted 10th overall by the San Miguel Beermen in 2001.

== Career ==
Mente first played for the Iloilo Mega Volts standout in the defunct Metropolitan Basketball Association during the maiden season of the league.

Mente was drafted by the San Miguel Beermen and played there from 2001-2005. Though his height was 5'10", he participated in the PBA Slam Dunk Contest, and won as the "2001 Slam Dunk King". In the 2006-07 PBA season, he played 20 games for Welcoat in the 2006-07 PBA season and averaged 8.3 points per game 2.6 rebounds per game and 1.7 assists per game.

== Illness and death ==
In 2018, Mente was diagnosed with two tumors, one in his head and the other in his chest, and underwent surgery. He later had radiation treatment and went home to Samar for chemotherapy. He died on August 22, 2018, at the age of 42.
