= 2003 PBA Reinforced Conference finals =

Team	Coach	Wins
Coca Cola Tigers	Chot Reyes	4
San Miguel Beermen	Jong Uichico	3
- Dates: November 30 – December 14, 2003
- MVP: Jeffrey Cariaso
- Television: NBN
- Radio network: Radyo PBA

PBA Reinforced Conference finals chronology
- < 1989

PBA finals chronology
- < 2003 Invitational 2004 Fiesta >

The 2003 Samsung-PBA Reinforced Conference finals, for sponsorship reasons, was the best-of-7 basketball championship series of the 2003 PBA Reinforced Conference and the conclusion of the conference's playoffs. The San Miguel Beermen and Coca Cola Tigers played for the 86th championship contested by the league.

After two runner-up finishes in the first two conferences, the Coca Cola Tigers won their 2nd PBA title with a 4–3 series victory over San Miguel Beermen.

== Series scoring summary ==
Team	Game 1	Game 2	Game 3	Game 4	Game 5	Game 6	Game 7	Wins
Coca Cola	81	103	81	87	86	80	92	4
San Miguel	84	79	86	84	84	85	84	3

== Games summary ==
=== Game 1 ===
NBN/IBC

November 30

recap

Coca Cola Tigers 81, San Miguel Beermen 84
Scoring by quarter: 20–25, 18–17, 22–27, 21–15
Pts: Artemus McClary 33	Pts: Kwan Johnson 17 Danny Ildefonso 17
San Miguel leads series, 1–0

Araneta Coliseum, Quezon City

The Beermen bucked the absence of Kwan Johnson and leaned on Danny Ildefonso down the stretch, Ildefonso scored 11 of his team's last 15 points and stole the ball from Coca Cola import Tee McClary with four seconds remaining as the Beermen escaped with a thrilling victory. SMB import Kwan Johnson spent the entire fourth period on the bench after hurting his left groin late in the third quarter. Rudy Hatfield and McClary joined forces in a 19–6 Tigers' run that cut the Beermen's 14-point lead to just one, 79–80, with barely a minute remaining.

=== Game 2 ===
NBN/IBC

December 3

Coca Cola Tigers 103, San Miguel Beermen 79
Series tied, 1–1

Araneta Coliseum, Quezon City

With the score at 62–43 in Coca Cola's favor, Tigers' import Tee McClary planted an elbow on Beerman Danny Ildefonso's side during a deadball situation in the third quarter, prompting the latter to retaliate with a close-fist assault, both players were thrown out of the ballgame. McClary and Ildefonso were suspended in the following game of the finals series for figuring in a fight.

=== Game 3 ===
NBN/IBC

December 5

recap

Coca Cola Tigers 81, San Miguel Beermen 86
Scoring by quarter: 23–26, 11–19, 24–17, 23–24
Pts: Jeffrey Cariaso 26	Pts: Dondon Hontiveros 22
San Miguel leads series, 2–1

Araneta Coliseum, Quezon City

Dondon Hontiveros stepped up in the absence of San Miguel import Kwan Johnson and Danny Ildefonso, the cebuano hotshot pumped in 13 of his team-high 22 points in the fourth quarter as the Beermen went through several deadlocks before putting the sting out of the importless Tigers. The Beermen brought in Cedric Ceballos, a last-minute replacement for the injured Johnson on a temporary basis, the NBA's 1992 slam dunk contest champion tossed in 11 points and hauled down 10 rebounds in 38 minutes of action.

=== Game 4 ===
NBN/IBC

December 7

recap

Coca Cola Tigers 87, San Miguel Beermen 84
Scoring by quarter: 21–24, 24–21, 28–17, 14–22
Pts: Artemus McClary 34	Pts: Kwan Johnson 19 Danny Ildefonso 19
Series tied, 2–2

Araneta Coliseum, Quezon City

The Tigers led, 73–62, entering the fourth quarter when Danny Ildefonso and Dorian Peña rallied the Beermen and gave them an 82–81 edge after a long scoreless spell by the Tigers, Rudy Hatfield nailed a triple with 49 seconds left that broke an 84-all deadlock and Hatfield, who scored 16 points with 16 rebounds, capped his heroics with a block on Dondon Hontiveros' potential game-tying three-pointer at the buzzer to preserved the Tigers' win.

=== Game 5 ===
NBN/IBC

December 10

Coca Cola Tigers 86, San Miguel Beermen 84
Scoring by quarter: 21–17, 11–20, 31–25, 23–22
Pts: Artemus McClary 17	Pts: Kwan Johnson 30
Coca Cola leads series, 3–2

Cuneta Astrodome, Pasay

Rob Wainwright scored 11 of his 14 points in the fourth quarter and along with Jeffrey Cariaso, stole the thunder from import Tee McClary as they spearheaded the Tigers' offensive in the payoff period that opened an 85–79 spread for the Tigers with less than two minutes remaining. SMB import Kwan Johnson, who return from a groin injury, flubbed a go-ahead triple in the final 21 seconds and saw his drive at the buzzer rim out, allowing the Tigers to escaped with a two-point victory.

=== Game 6 ===
NBN/IBC

December 12

Coca Cola Tigers 80, San Miguel Beermen 85
Series tied, 3–3

Philsports Arena, Pasig

=== Game 7 ===
NBN/IBC

December 14

Coca Cola Tigers 92, San Miguel Beermen 84
Scoring by quarter: 21–27, 23–14, 21–18, 27–25
Pts: Artemus McClary 25	Pts: Dorian Peña 23
Coca Cola wins series, 4–3

Araneta Coliseum, Quezon City

The Tigers were up, 65–59, entering the final quarter. Tee McClary scored 11 of his 25 points in the fourth period and pounced on those eight turnovers by the Beermen as Coca Cola got their biggest lead of the game at 85–70 with 5:45 left, the Beermen countered with a 12–2 surge to trim the deficit to 82–87 with 1:39 remaining.

2003 PBA Reinforced Conference Champions

Coca Cola Tigers
2nd title

== Rosters ==
Coca-Cola Tigers roster
Players

Pos.	#	POB	Name	Height	Weight	DOB (YYYY–MM–DD)	From
F	4	(United States)	Rafi Reavis	6 ft 6 in (1.98 m)			Coppin State
G	5	(United States)	Rob Wainwright	6 ft 5 in (1.96 m)			Solano CC
G	8	(Philippines)	Gec Chia	6 ft 2 in (1.88 m)			Ateneo
C	9	(Philippines)	Gilbert Lao	6 ft 7 in (2.01 m)			UST
G	10	(Philippines)	Ato Morano	6 ft 0 in (1.83 m)			San Beda
G	14	(Philippines)	Johnny Abarrientos	5 ft 8 in (1.73 m)			Far Eastern
F	16	(Philippines)	Bong Hawkins	6 ft 4 in (1.93 m)			UPHSD
G	18	(Philippines)	Leo Avenido	6 ft 2 in (1.88 m)			Far Eastern
G	20	(United States)	Artemus McClary (I)	6 ft 3 in (1.91 m)			Jacksonville
F	21	(Philippines)	Reynel Hugnatan	6 ft 3 in (1.91 m)			Manila
G	22	(United States)	Jeffrey Cariaso	6 ft 2 in (1.88 m)			Sonoma State
C	24	(Philippines)	Cris Bolado	6 ft 7 in (2.01 m)			National-U
F	25	(Philippines)	Freddie Abuda	6 ft 4 in (1.93 m)			Cebu
G	31	(United States)	William Antonio	6 ft 3 in (1.91 m)			Chaminade
C	32	(Philippines)	Poch Juinio	6 ft 5 in (1.96 m)			Philippines
F	99	(United States)	Rudy Hatfield	6 ft 3 in (1.91 m)			UM–Dearborn

Coaches
Head coach
- (Philippines) Chot Reyes
Assistant(s)
- (Philippines) Nash Racela
- (Philippines) Biboy Ravanes
- (Philippines) Binky Favis
- (Philippines) Aboy Castro
- (Philippines) Mike Reyes

Legend
- (DP) Unsigned draft pick
- (FA) Free agent
- (S) Suspended
- (I) Import
- Injured

San Miguel Beermen roster
Players

Pos.	#	POB	Name	Height	Weight	DOB (YYYY–MM–DD)	From
G	1	(Philippines)	Boybits Victoria	5 ft 10 in (1.78 m)			San Beda
F	2	(Philippines)	Bryan Gahol	6 ft 4 in (1.93 m)			Philippines
F	3	(United States)	Nic Belasco	6 ft 4 in (1.93 m)			Notre Dame (OH)
C	4	(United States)	Dorian Peña	6 ft 6 in (1.98 m)			Coppin State
G	6	(Philippines)	Billy Moody	6 ft 1 in (1.85 m)			Letran
G	7	(Philippines)	Dondon Hontiveros	6 ft 2 in (1.88 m)			Cebu
F/C	10	(Philippines)	Danny Ildefonso	6 ft 6 in (1.98 m)			National-U
F	11	(Philippines)	Arnold Calo	6 ft 3 in (1.91 m)			MLQU
C	14	(Philippines)	Benjie Paras	6 ft 5 in (1.96 m)			Philippines
G	17	(Philippines)	Olsen Racela	5 ft 10 in (1.78 m)			Ateneo
G	21	(Philippines)	Joey Mente	5 ft 10 in (1.78 m)			Lyceum
F/C	22	(Philippines)	Arnold Gamboa	6 ft 6 in (1.98 m)			Far Eastern
G	23	(United States)	Kwan Johnson (I)	6 ft 3 in (1.91 m)			LSU New Orleans
F	24	(United States)	Cedric Ceballos (I)	6 ft 4 in (1.93 m)			Cal State Fullerton
F	29	(Philippines)	Marlon Legaspi	6 ft 5 in (1.96 m)			MLQU

Coaches
Head coach
- (Philippines) Jong Uichico
Assistant(s)
- (Philippines) Siot Tanquingcen
- (Philippines) Arturo Dela Cruz

Legend
- (DP) Unsigned draft pick
- (FA) Free agent
- (S) Suspended
- (I) Import
- Injured

== Broadcast notes ==
Game	Play-by-play	Analyst
Game 1	Sev Sarmenta	Norman Black
Game 2		
Game 3		
Game 4		
Game 5	Vitto Lazatin	Norman Black
Game 6	Sev Sarmenta	Quinito Henson
Game 7	Mico Halili	Jayvee Gayoso
