= 2003 Coca-Cola Tigers season =

- Head coach: Chot Reyes
- General manager: Hector Calma
- Owner: Coca-Cola Bottlers Philippines, Inc.

All-Filipino Cup results
- Record: 19–12 (61.3%)
- Place: 2nd
- Playoff finish: Runner-up

Invitational Cup results
- Record: 5–3 (62.5%)
- Place: 2nd
- Playoff finish: Runner-up

Reinforced Conference results
- Record: 11–2 (84.6%)
- Place: 2nd (Group B)
- Playoff finish: Champions (def. San Miguel 4–3)

Coca-Cola Tigers seasons

The 2003 Coca-Cola Tigers season was the 2nd season of the franchise in the Philippine Basketball Association (PBA).

== Championship (finals stint) ==
The Coca-Cola Tigers played in the finals in all three conferences of the league's 29th season. In the All-Filipino Cup, the defending champions blew a 2–0 series lead in the best-of-seven championship against Talk 'N Text Phone Pals and lost in six games. Coca-Cola placed runner-up for the second straight conference when they lost to Alaska in the best-of-three finals series of the short Invitational championship.

Coca-Cola didn't end up bridesmaid for the third time in the season by winning over San Miguel Beermen in the season-ending Reinforced Conference. The Tigers defeated the Beermen in the deciding seventh game as coach Chot Reyes won his second title for Coca-Cola and fourth overall in his coaching career.

== Award ==
Artemus McClary was voted the Reinforced Conference Best Import.

== Roster ==
2003 Coca-Cola Tigers roster
Players

Pos.	#	POB	Name	Height	Weight	DOB (YYYY–MM–DD)	From
F	4	(United States)	Rafi Reavis	6 ft 6 in (1.98 m)			Coppin State
G	5	(United States)	Rob Wainwright	6 ft 5 in (1.96 m)			Solano CC
G	8	(Philippines)	Gec Chia	6 ft 2 in (1.88 m)			Ateneo
C	9	(Philippines)	Gilbert Lao	6 ft 7 in (2.01 m)			UST
G	10	(Philippines)	Ato Morano	6 ft 0 in (1.83 m)			San Beda
G	14	(Philippines)	Johnny Abarrientos	5 ft 8 in (1.73 m)			Far Eastern
F	16	(Philippines)	Bong Hawkins	6 ft 4 in (1.93 m)			UPHSD
G	18	(Philippines)	Leo Avenido	6 ft 2 in (1.88 m)			Far Eastern
G	20	(United States)	Artemus McClary (I)	6 ft 3 in (1.91 m)			Jacksonville
F	21	(Philippines)	Reynel Hugnatan	6 ft 3 in (1.91 m)			Manila
G	22	(United States)	Jeffrey Cariaso	6 ft 2 in (1.88 m)			Sonoma State
C	24	(Philippines)	Cris Bolado	6 ft 7 in (2.01 m)			National-U
F	25	(Philippines)	Freddie Abuda	6 ft 4 in (1.93 m)			Cebu
G	31	(United States)	William Antonio	6 ft 3 in (1.91 m)			Chaminade
C	32	(Philippines)	Poch Juinio	6 ft 5 in (1.96 m)			Philippines
F	99	(United States)	Rudy Hatfield	6 ft 3 in (1.91 m)			UM–Dearborn

Coaches
Head coach
- (Philippines) Chot Reyes
Assistant(s)
- (Philippines) Nash Racela
- (Philippines) Biboy Ravanes
- (Philippines) Binky Favis
- (Philippines) Aboy Castro
- (Philippines) Mike Reyes

Legend
- (DP) Unsigned draft pick
- (FA) Free agent
- (S) Suspended
- (I) Import
- Injured

== Game results ==
=== All-Filipino Cup ===
Date	Opponent	Score	Top scorer	Venue	Location
February 28	San Miguel	72–67		Makati Coliseum	Makati City
March 5	Shell	103–92	Cariaso (18 pts)	Philsports Arena	Pasig
March 8	Purefoods	93–88 2OT			Iloilo City
March 16	Brgy.Ginebra	83–79	Cariaso (14 pts)	Araneta Coliseum	Quezon City
March 21	Red Bull	79–80		Araneta Coliseum	Quezon City
March 23	FedEx	72–85		Araneta Coliseum	Quezon City
March 30	Alaska	77–86		Araneta Coliseum	Quezon City
April 6	Sta.Lucia	82–84	Cariaso (19 pts)	Philsports Arena	Pasig
April 12	Talk 'N Text	79–78			San Fernando, Pampanga
April 20	Red Bull	94–102	Reavis (18 pts)	Araneta Coliseum	Quezon City
April 26	Brgy.Ginebra	83–54		Ynares Center	Antipolo City
April 30	Shell	95–81		Makati Coliseum	Makati City
May 4	Talk 'N Text	87–91		Araneta Coliseum	Quezon City
May 9	Purefoods	97–87	Hatfield (21 pts)	Philsports Arena	Pasig
May 14	San Miguel	77–82		Philsports Arena	Pasig
May 18	Alaska	90–87		Araneta Coliseum	Quezon City
May 23	Sta.Lucia	98–76		Makati Coliseum	Makati City
May 28	FedEx	89–87		Philsports Arena	Pasig

Win
Win via OT
loss
loss via OT
