= 2004–05 Coca-Cola Tigers season =

- Head coach: Chot Reyes; Eric Altamirano
- General Manager: Hector Calma
- Owner(s): Coca-Cola Bottlers Philippines

Fiesta Conference (Transition) results
- Record: 16–10 (61.5%)
- Place: 4th
- Playoff finish: Semifinals

Philippine Cup results
- Record: 9–12 (42.9%)
- Place: 7th
- Playoff finish: Wildcard

Fiesta Conference results
- Record: 6–13 (31.6%)
- Place: 10th
- Playoff finish: Wildcard

Coca-Cola Tigers seasons

The 2004–2005 Coca-Cola Tigers season was the 3rd season of the franchise in the Philippine Basketball Association (PBA).

== Draft picks ==
Round	Pick	Player	Nationality	College
1	10	Gary David	Philippines	Lyceum
2	19	Manny Ramos	Philippines	La Salle

== Occurrences ==
Coach Eric Altamirano became the new head coach of Coca-Cola starting the 2005 PBA Fiesta Conference, taking over from Chot Reyes, who was assigned to coach the national team, Altamirano handled the Purefoods Tender Juicy Hotdogs in 2002 before he was called to serve the national team in the Busan Asian Games.

== Roster ==
2004–05 Coca-Cola Tigers roster
Players

Pos.	#	POB	Name	Height	Weight	DOB (YYYY–MM–DD)	From
F	2	(United States)	Ali Peek (A)	6 ft 4 in (1.93 m)			Saint Mary's
F	4	(United States)	Rafi Reavis	6 ft 6 in (1.98 m)			Coppin State
G	5	(United States)	Rob Wainwright	6 ft 5 in (1.96 m)			Solano CC
G	8	(Philippines)	Gec Chia	6 ft 2 in (1.88 m)			Ateneo
C	9	(Philippines)	Gilbert Lao	6 ft 7 in (2.01 m)			UST
G	10	(Philippines)	Renato Morano	6 ft 0 in (1.83 m)			San Beda
G	14	(Philippines)	Johnny Abarrientos	5 ft 8 in (1.73 m)			Far Eastern
G	18	(Philippines)	Leo Avenido	6 ft 2 in (1.88 m)			Far Eastern
F	31	(United States)	John Arigo (A)	6 ft 4 in (1.93 m)			North Florida
C	32	(Philippines)	Poch Juinio	6 ft 5 in (1.96 m)			Philippines
C	33	(Philippines)	Manny Ramos	6 ft 7 in (2.01 m)			De La Salle
G	34	(United States)	William Antonio	6 ft 3 in (1.91 m)			Chaminade
G	50	(Philippines)	Dale Singson (A)	6 ft 0 in (1.83 m)			UST
F	88	(Philippines)	Edwin Bacani	6 ft 3 in (1.91 m)			Far Eastern
F	99	(United States)	Rudy Hatfield	6 ft 3 in (1.91 m)			UM–Dearborn

Coaches
Head coach
- (Philippines) Eric Altamirano
Assistant(s)
- (Philippines) Biboy Ravanes
- (Philippines) Nash Racela
- (Philippines) Aboy Castro
- (Philippines) Mike Reyes

Legend
- (DP) Unsigned draft pick
- (FA) Free agent
- (S) Suspended
- (A) Acquired
- Injured

== Philippine Cup ==
=== Game log ===
2005 PBA Philippine Cup game log
October

Game	Date	Opponent	Score	High points	High rebounds	High assists	Location Attendance	Record
1	October 6	Shell	91-83	David (20)			Araneta Coliseum	1–0
2	October 10	Purefoods	76–78	Hatfield (17)			Araneta Coliseum	1–1
3	October 14	Alaska	71-68	Hatfield (16)			Butuan	2–1
4	October 17	San Miguel	92-84	Cariaso (20)			Araneta Coliseum	3–1
5	October 22	Talk 'N Text	77–96	Juinio (20)			Philsports Arena	3–2
6	October 27	FedEx	84-67	Reavis (19)			Araneta Coliseum	4–2

November

Game	Date	Opponent	Score	High points	High rebounds	High assists	Location Attendance	Record
10	November 17	Red Bull	101-88				Araneta Coliseum	5–5

December

Game	Date	Opponent	Score	High points	High rebounds	High assists	Location Attendance	Record
14	December 2	Purefoods	76–82	Peek (19)			Lipa City	5–9
15	December 5	Talk 'N Text	93-81	Avenido (17)			Araneta Coliseum	6–9
16	December 12	Red Bull	102-96	Peek (28)			Araneta Coliseum	7–9
17	December 16	San Miguel	75–80	Wainwright (17)			Dagupan	7–10

January

Game	Date	Opponent	Score	High points	High rebounds	High assists	Location Attendance	Record
18	January 5	FedEx	104–97	Arigo (35)			Philsports Arena	8–10

2004–05 schedule

== Transactions ==
=== Trades ===
Traded	to	For
Reynel Hugnatan	Alaska Aces	Ali Peek
Jeffrey Cariaso	Alaska Aces	John Arigo
Gary David	FedEx Express	Dale Singson

=== Additions ===
Player	Signed	Former team
Edwin Bacani	2005 Fiesta	Shell Turbo Chargers

=== Subtractions ===
Player	Signed	New team
Bong Hawkins	2004–05 Philippine Cup	Alaska Aces

== Recruited imports ==
Tournament	Name	#	Height	From	GP
2004 PBA Fiesta Conference	Mark Sanford	3	6 ft 10 in (2.08 m)	University of Washington	
2005 PBA Fiesta Conference	Jaja Richards	00	6 ft 10 in (2.08 m)	Loyola-Chicago	4
2005 PBA Fiesta Conference	Bakari Hendrix	35	6 ft 8 in (2.03 m)	Gonzaga University	2
2005 PBA Fiesta Conference	Darrell Johns	23	7 ft 0 in (2.13 m)	Chicago State College	3
2005 PBA Fiesta Conference	Mark Sanford	3	6 ft 10 in (2.08 m)	University of Washington	10

^{GP – Games played}
