= 2005–06 Alaska Aces season =

- Head coach: Tim Cone
- General Manager: Joaqui Trillo
- Owner(s): Fred Uytengsu

Fiesta Conference results
- Record: 9–12 (42.9%)
- Place: 6th
- Playoff finish: Quarterfinals

Philippine Cup results
- Record: 16–12 (57.1%)
- Place: 3rd
- Playoff finish: Semifinals

Alaska Aces seasons

The 2005–06 Alaska Aces season was the 20th season of the franchise in the Philippine Basketball Association (PBA).

== Key dates ==
- August 14: The 2005 PBA Draft took place in Sta. Lucia East Grand Mall, Cainta, Rizal.

== Draft picks ==
Round	Pick	Player	Height	Position	Nationality	College
2	15	Mark Joseph Kong	6'8"	Center	Philippines	Adamson

== Roster ==
2005–06 Alaska Aces roster
Players

Pos.	#	POB	Name	Height	Weight	DOB (YYYY–MM–DD)	From
G	1	(Philippines)	Mike Cortez	6 ft 0 in (1.83 m)	170 lb (77 kg)	1980-11-10	De La Salle
F	3	(United States)	Nic Belasco	6 ft 6 in (1.98 m)	210 lb (95 kg)	1973-12-10	Notre Dame de Namur
F	4	(Philippines)	Willy Wilson	6 ft 3 in (1.91 m)	215 lb (98 kg)	1980-01-30	De La Salle
G	5	(Philippines)	Rensy Bajar	5 ft 10 in (1.78 m)	155 lb (70 kg)	1976-10-06	San Beda
C	7	(Papua New Guinea)	Sonny Thoss	6 ft 7 in (2.01 m)	205 lb (93 kg)	1981-12-07	James Cook
F	11	(Philippines)	Eddie Laure	6 ft 3 in (1.91 m)	195 lb (88 kg)	1977-06-07	Adamson
G	13	(Philippines)	Willie Miller	6 ft 0 in (1.83 m)		1977-07-13	Letran
F	16	(Philippines)	Bong Hawkins	6 ft 4 in (1.93 m)	215 lb (98 kg)	1967-11-06	UPHSD
F	21	(Philippines)	Reynel Hugnatan	6 ft 3 in (1.91 m)	210 lb (95 kg)	1978-11-03	Manila
G	22	(United States)	Jeffrey Cariaso	6 ft 2 in (1.88 m)	180 lb (82 kg)	1972-09-12	Sonoma State
F	29	(Philippines)	Bernzon Franco	6 ft 4 in (1.93 m)		1979-05-30	Philippine Christian
G/F	35	(United States)	Tony Dela Cruz	6 ft 4 in (1.93 m)	209 lb (95 kg)	1978-08-24	UC Irvine
PF	55	(Philippines)	John Ferriols	6 ft 4 in (1.93 m)	205 lb (93 kg)	1974-09-09	USJ–R
G	23	(United States)	Artemus McClary (I)	6 ft 3 in (1.91 m)	226 lb (103 kg)	1973-12-28	Jacksonville
G	40	(United States)	Odell Bradley (I)	6 ft 4 in (1.93 m)	240 lb (109 kg)	1981-09-06	IUPUI

Coaches
Head coach
- (United States) Tim Cone
Assistant(s)
- (Philippines) Dickie Bachmann
- (Philippines) Luigi Trillo
- (Philippines) Jojo Lastimosa

Legend
- (DP) Unsigned draft pick
- (FA) Free agent
- (S) Suspended
- (I) Import
- Injured

== Fiesta Conference ==
=== Game log ===
2006 PBA Fiesta Conference game log
October

Game	Date	Opponent	Score	High points	High rebounds	High assists	Location Attendance	Record
1	October 5	Sta. Lucia	80–75				Araneta Coliseum	1–0
2	October 9	Red Bull	75–76	McClary (23)			Araneta Coliseum	1–1
3	October 14	Purefoods	84–86 OT	McClary (27)			Cuneta Astrodome	1–2
4	October 19	Brgy.Ginebra	102–72	McClary (32)			Araneta Coliseum	2–2
5	October 21	Air21	111–108 (2OT)	Cariaso (22)			Araneta Coliseum	3–2
6	October 28	Coca-Cola					Cuneta Astrodome	4–2

November

Game	Date	Opponent	Score	High points	High rebounds	High assists	Location Attendance	Record
7	November 2	Red Bull	81–64	McClary (31)			Cuneta Astrodome	5–2
8	November 6	Talk 'N Text	79–101	Cariaso (17)			Araneta Coliseum	5–3
9	November 13	Coca-Cola	63–86	McClary (17)			Araneta Coliseum	5–4
10	November 16	Air21	83–88	McClary (15)			Araneta Coliseum	5–5
11	November 19	Purefoods	69–78				Lucena City	5–6
12	November 23	San Miguel	62–66				Araneta Coliseum	5–7

December

Game	Date	Opponent	Score	High points	High rebounds	High assists	Location Attendance	Record
13	December 7	Sta. Lucia	87–82	Cariaso (17)			Ynares Center	6–7
14	December 17	Talk 'N Text	84–92	Bradley (23)			Balanga, Bataan	6–8
15	December 21	San Miguel					Cuneta Astrodome	7–8
16	December 25	Brgy.Ginebra	89–96	Bradley (34)			Cuneta Astrodome	7–9

2005–06 schedule

== Transactions ==
=== Trades ===
March, 2006	To Alaska Aces Nic Belasco	To San Miguel Beermen Brandon Cablay Mark Kong
May 8, 2006	To Alaska Aces Willie Miller, John Ferriols	To Talk 'N Text Don Allado

=== Additions ===
Player	Signed	Former team
Rensy Bajar	March 2006	Shell Turbo Chargers
Eddie Laure	March 2006	Purefoods Chunkee Giants

=== Subtractions ===
Player	Signed	New team
Rich Alvarez	March 2006	Red Bull Barako
Stephen Padilla	March 2006	Air21 Express
