= 2004–05 Alaska Aces season =

- Head coach: Tim Cone
- General Manager: Joaqui Trillo
- Owner(s): Wilfred Uytengsu

Fiesta Conference (Transition) results
- Record: 12–9 (57.1%)
- Place: 6th
- Playoff finish: Quarterfinals

Philippine Cup results
- Record: 11–11 (50%)
- Place: 5th
- Playoff finish: Quarterfinals

Fiesta Conference results
- Record: 13–10 (56.5%)
- Place: 5th
- Playoff finish: Quarterfinals

Alaska Aces seasons

The 2004–2005 Alaska Aces season was the 19th season of the franchise in the Philippine Basketball Association (PBA).

== Draft picks ==
Round	Pick	Player	Nationality	College
1	5	Sonny Thoss	Papua New Guinea	James Cook
2	15	Willy Wilson	Philippines	La Salle
3	22	Bernzon Franco	Philippines	PCU

== Roster ==
2004–05 Alaska Aces roster
Players

Pos.	#	POB	Name	Height	Weight	DOB (YYYY–MM–DD)	From
F	3	(United States)	Eugene Tejada	6 ft 5 in (1.96 m)			Chabot
F	4	(Philippines)	Willy Wilson	6 ft 3 in (1.91 m)			De La Salle
F	5	(United States)	Rob Duat	6 ft 4 in (1.93 m)			Menlo
C	7	(Papua New Guinea)	Sonny Thoss	6 ft 7 in (2.01 m)			James Cook
C	8	(Philippines)	Don Allado	6 ft 6 in (1.98 m)			De La Salle
G	9	(Philippines)	Stephen Padilla	5 ft 11 in (1.80 m)			Visayas
G	11	(Philippines)	Mike Cortez	6 ft 0 in (1.83 m)			De La Salle
F	16	(Philippines)	Bong Hawkins	6 ft 4 in (1.93 m)			UPHSD
F	21	(Philippines)	Reynel Hugnatan (A)	6 ft 4 in (1.93 m)			Manila
G	22	(United States)	Jeffrey Cariaso (A)	6 ft 2 in (1.88 m)			Sonoma State
G	24	(United States)	Brandon Cablay	6 ft 0 in (1.83 m)			Vanguard
G	25	(United States)	Rob Johnson	6 ft 0 in (1.83 m)
F	29	(Philippines)	Bernzon Franco	6 ft 4 in (1.93 m)			Philippine Christian

Coaches
Head coach
- (United States) Tim Cone
Assistant(s)
- (Philippines) Dickie Bachmann
- (Philippines) Luigi Trillo
- (Philippines) Jojo Lastimosa

Legend
- (DP) Unsigned draft pick
- (FA) Free agent
- (S) Suspended
- (A) Acquired
- Injured

== Philippine Cup ==
=== Game log ===
2005 PBA Philippine Cup game log
October

Game	Date	Opponent	Score	High points	High rebounds	High assists	Location Attendance	Record
1	October 8	Talk 'N Text	86–94	Cortez (22)			Makati Coliseum	0–1
2	October 14	Coca-Cola	68–71	Cortez (16) Allado (16)			Butuan	0–2
3	October 17	FedEx	90–98	Thoss (17)			Araneta Coliseum	0–3
4	October 20	Red Bull	79-71	Thoss (21)	Thoss (15)		Araneta Coliseum	1–3
5	October 24	San Miguel	67–75	Hugnatan (21)			Araneta Coliseum	1–4
6	October 28	Shell	78–80 OT	Cariaso (18)			Iloilo City	1–5

December

Game	Date	Opponent	Score	High points	High rebounds	High assists	Location Attendance	Record
14	December 1	Shell	85–89	Cariaso (29)			Araneta Coliseum	5–9
15	December 9	FedEx	114-102				Urdaneta City	6–9
16	December 12	Brgy.Ginebra	102-88	Cablay (16)			Araneta Coliseum	7–9
17	December 17	Purefoods	86-70	Cortez (16)			Ynares Center	8–9

January

Game	Date	Opponent	Score	High points	High rebounds	High assists	Location Attendance	Record
18	January 5	Sta. Lucia	105-95	Cablay (22)			Philsports Arena	9–9

2004–05 schedule

== Transactions ==
=== Trades ===
Traded	to	For
Ali Peek	Coca-Cola Tigers ^{October 24, 2004}	Reynel Hugnatan
John Arigo	Coca-Cola Tigers ^{October 24, 2004}	Jeffrey Cariaso

=== Additions ===
Player	Signed	Former team
Bong Hawkins	2004–05 Philippine Cup	Coca-Cola Tigers
Rob Johnson	2004–05 Philippine Cup	Purefoods TJ Hotdogs

== Recruited imports ==
Tournament	Name	#	Height	From	GP
2004 PBA Fiesta Conference	Galen Young	1	6 ft 4 in (1.93 m)	North Carolina	21
2005 PBA Fiesta Conference	Leon Derricks		6 ft 8 in (2.03 m)	University of Detroit	4
2005 PBA Fiesta Conference	Dickey Simpkins	8	6 ft 8 in (2.03 m)	Providence College	19

^{GP – Games played}
