= Artemus McClary =

American basketball player (born 1973)

Personal information
- Born: December 28, 1973 (age 52)
- Listed height: 6 ft 6 in (1.98 m)
- Listed weight: 103 lb (47 kg)

Career information
- College: Jacksonville University
- NBA draft: 1996: undrafted
- Playing career: 1996–2005
- Position: Shooting Guard / Forward
- Number: 20, 25

Career history
- 1997, 1998: Mobiline Phone Pals
- 2000–2002: Seoul Samsung Thunders
- 2003: Coca-Cola Tigers
- 2003–2004: Daegu Orions
- 2004: Jacksonville Wave
- 2005: Reales de La Vega
- 2005–2006: Alaska Aces

Career highlights
- As player: LNB champion (2005); KBL champion (2000–01); KBL Best 5 (2000–01); PBA champion (2003 Reinforced); PBA Best Import (2003 Reinforced)

Artemus Robert McClary (born December 28, 1973) is an American retired professional basketball player, best known for playing for professional basketball teams in the Philippine Basketball Association (PBA).

== Early life, family and education ==
McClary attended Jacksonville University where he played for its Jacksonville Dolphins basketball team. He was named all-conference first team in three consecutive seasons (1994–96) when the team was part of the Sun Belt Conference.

== Professional basketball career ==
=== Mobiline Phone Pals ===
In 1997, McClary played for Mobiline Phone Pals for 1997 Governors' Cup. He returned for the Phone Pals in the 1998 edition. But he already suited up for the team in the conference before that 1998 edition, the Centennial Cup which he led the team with Silas Mills to a special championship. The duo also led the team into 1998 Governors Cup finals, but lost to Formula Shell in seven games.

=== Seoul Samsung Thunder ===
He played for Seoul Samsung Thunder of the Korean Basketball League from 2000 until 2002. He led the team into a championship in 2001 with a 29–9 record.

=== Coca-Cola Tigers ===
After Korean stint, McClary played for Coca-Cola Tigers in the 2003 Reinforced Conference. He was awarded as the best import of that conference. He led the team into a championship defeating San Miguel Beermen in seven games.

=== Daegu Orions ===
After Philippine stint, he returned to Korea to play for Daegu Orions in 2004.

=== North American Leagues ===
McClary played for Jacksonville Wave in 2004 in the US and in Reales dela Vega in Dominican League in 2005. In Reales, he won the championship in the inaugural year of the league.

=== Alaska Aces ===
McClary once again returned to the Philippines, this time for the Alaska Aces for the 2005–06 Fiesta Conference. But after some games, he said to the management that "he lost his motivation" and "want to win". He was later let go by the management in January 2006 and did not play professionally after that.

== PBA career statistics ==
Legend
GP	Games played	MPG	Minutes per game
FG%	Field-goal percentage	3P%	3-point field-goal percentage	FT%	Free-throw percentage
RPG	Rebounds per game	APG	Assists per game	SPG	Steals per game
BPG	Blocks per game	PPG	Points per game	**Bold**	Career high

=== Season-by-season averages ===
Year	Team	GP	RPG	APG	SPG	BPG	PPG
1997	Mobiline	15	15.7	5.1	1.6	1.3	**33.3**
1998	Mobiline	31	10.2	4.2	1.4	1.0	24.9
2003	Coca-Cola	25	12.6	5.0	1.48	1.3	27.2
2005–06	Alaska	12	15.0	6.5	1.5	1.8	20.8
Career		83	12.6	4.9	1.4	1.2	26.5
