= Sonny Thoss =

Filipino basketball player (born 1981)

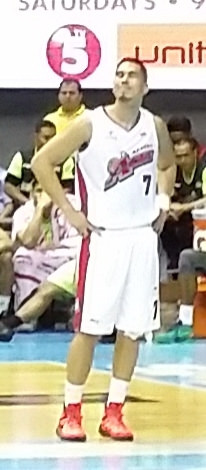
- Thoss in 2015

Personal information
- Born: December 7, 1981 (age 44) Port Moresby, Papua New Guinea
- Listed height: 6 ft 7 in (2.01 m)
- Listed weight: 205 lb (93 kg)

Career information
- College: James Cook University
- PBA draft: 2004: 1st round, 5th overall pick
- Drafted by: Alaska Aces
- Playing career: 2004–2019
- Position: Center
- Number: 7

Career history
- 2004–2019: Alaska Aces

Career highlights
- 3× PBA champion (2007 Fiesta, 2010 Fiesta, 2013 Commissioner's); PBA Finals Most Valuable Player (2013 Commissioner's); 12× PBA All-Star (2004–2005, 2007–2014, 2017–2018); 2× PBA Mythical First Team (2010, 2011); 4× PBA Mythical Second Team (2008, 2012–2014); PBA All Rookie Team (2005); PBA Sportsmanship Award (2011); No. 7 retired by Alaska Aces

Joachim Gunther "Sonny" Thoss (born December 7, 1981) is a German-Filipino former professional basketball player. He played his entire career in the Philippine Basketball Association (PBA) with the Alaska Aces, where his jersey number is retired.

== Early life and education ==
Joachim Thoss was born on December 7, 1981, in Papua New Guinea to a German father and to a Filipina mother. His father, Joachim Thoss Sr. was an East German patrol guard who patrolled the Berlin Wall before it fell and is a carpenter who is involved in construction projects in Papua New Guinea. The younger Thoss' mother, Jesusa Marticio, is from Cebu.

He attended Port Moresby High School. Basketball competitions in Papua New Guinea are rare; Thoss only represented his high school in one-day tournaments. He moved to Australia in 1999 to attend James Cook University.

== Semi-professional career ==
After Thoss moved to Australia played for the Cairns Marlins of the Australian Basketball Association. He trained under Cairns Taipans assistant coach, Aaron Fearne. During his Marlins stint he was named as Most Improved Player in 2001 and was named as part of the league's under-23 squad.

== Professional career ==
He was the 5th overall pick in the 2004 PBA draft selected by the Alaska Aces and he was also the tallest rookie picked in that class. In his early years, Sonny was the backup center for the Aces behind the dominant big men Ali Peek and E.J. Feihl in Alaska's rotation. But in his later years, Thoss eventually became Alaska's starting big man and become one of the team's top players.

In the 2007 Fiesta Conference, he won his first championship.

In the 2009–10 Philippine Cup finals, Thoss and the Aces were swept by the Purefoods TJ Giants. The Aces were able to bounce back in that year's Fiesta Conference finals, by defeating the San Miguel Beermen in five games.

In 2011, he was awarded the PBA Sportsmanship Award.

In 2012, he and Alaska finished with a 10–22 record.

In the 2012–13 Philippine Cup, the Aces started the season with two straight losses. But the Aces were able to get their first win of the season despite Thoss suffering from a bum stomach against the Barako Bull Energy Cola. Despite having zero points, he had six rebounds and four blocks. From there, the Aces went on a four-game winning streak. In the 2013 Commissioner's Cup, he earned Player of the Week honors for the week of March 4–10. He then missed several games during the Commissioner's Cup due to a bad back. But once the playoffs began, the 31-year-old veteran center helped the top-seeded Aces to victories over the Air21 Express in the quarterfinals, before dethroning the San Mig Coffee Mixers following a 3–1 series win in the semifinals. He raised his game further in the finals, averaging 14 points and close to 10 rebounds, while playing a huge defensive role in neutralizing Barangay Ginebra import Vernon Macklin. The Aces won the title that conference, as he claimed Finals MVP. He was also on the Mythical Second Team and All-Defensive Team that season.

In the 2013–14 Philippine Cup, Thoss grabbed 11 rebounds in a win over San Mig Coffee. Some games later, he had a career-high 30 points in an overtime loss to the Talk N' Text Tropang Texters. The Aces failed to defend their Commissioner's Cup title that year. He was named to the Mythical Second Team and the All-Star team for that season. After the season, he, together with JVee Casio and Cyrus Baguio, re-signed with the Aces.

In the 2014–15 Philippine Cup finals, Thoss matched up with June Mar Fajardo, where the Beermen beat the Aces in seven games. They matched up again in the 2015–16 Philippine Cup finals, from Game 5 up to the end of the series. San Miguel won that series despite Alaska holding a 3–0 series lead at first. He struggled in that series.

At age 35, he had a conference-high 15 points in a win over the Rain or Shine Elastopainters during the 2017 Commissioner's Cup. He also had five rebounds and two assists in that game, giving him Player of the Week honors. He was once again an all-star that year and the following year as well.

In 2018, he also participated in the Obstacle Challenge during All-Star Week. The Aces also made the finals for the Governors' Cup, where they lost to the Magnolia Hotshots in six games.

In 2019, he scored 21 points against the NLEX Road Warriors to send the Aces to the Philippine Cup playoffs.

On May 17, 2021, Coach Jeffrey Cariaso announced that Thoss had retired.

== National team career ==
In 2009, Thoss was named to the Powerade Team Pilipinas for the 2009 FIBA Asia Men's championship. He averaged 13 points, 5.5 rebounds, and 1.0 block in the first three games of the tournament, but those numbers dipped to just 3.5 points and 4.5 rebounds in the last six games. For that performance, he wasn't considered for the 2010 Asian Games and 2011 FIBA Asia Championships in Wuhan, China.

In 2012, Thoss was on the Gilas team that won the gold medal at the Jones Cup. At first, he wasn't allowed to play in the FIBA Asia Cup that year, as Alaska team owner Wilfred Uytengsu insisted that he practice with the Aces instead after a dismal record the previous season. But eventually, he was able to participate in the tournament, where Gilas finished fourth.

The following year, Thoss was named to the Gilas pool for the 2013 FIBA Asia Championship. But once again, he was not allowed from joining Gilas practices. Alaska and the national team were able to reach a compromise, which was that Thoss was only allowed to observe practices. He also had to miss a training camp in Lithuania, as he had to have therapy for his back. He was not chosen for the final lineup for that tournament.

In 2015, Thoss was the backup big man for naturalized player Andray Blatche during the 2015 FIBA Asia Championship.

== Honors ==
On November 12, 2015, he was named as one of Alaska's 30 Greatest Players.

On March 6, 2022, Thoss' number was retired by the Aces.

== PBA career statistics ==
Legend
| GP | Games played | MPG | Minutes per game |
| FG% | Field-goal percentage | 3P% | 3-point field-goal percentage | FT% | Free-throw percentage |
| RPG | Rebounds per game | APG | Assists per game | SPG | Steals per game |
| BPG | Blocks per game | PPG | Points per game | **Bold** | Career high |

=== Season-by-season averages ===
| Year | Team | GP | MPG | FG% | 3P% | FT% | RPG | APG | SPG | BPG | PPG |
|---|---|---|---|---|---|---|---|---|---|---|---|
| 2004–05 | Alaska | **67** | 21.8 | .468 | .000 | .659 | 5.6 | 1.0 | .3 | .4 | 6.3 |
| 2005–06 | Alaska | 49 | 21.0 | .475 | — | .661 | 5.4 | .8 | .2 | .6 | 5.7 |
| 2006–07 | Alaska | 53 | 25.1 | **.576** | — | .709 | 6.2 | 1.2 | .3 | .6 | 10.1 |
| 2007–08 | Alaska | 47 | 30.3 | .537 | .000 | **.732** | 8.3 | 1.8 | .2 | .7 | 9.6 |
| 2008–09 | Alaska | 47 | 27.0 | .548 | .500 | .595 | 6.5 | 1.0 | .4 | 1.0 | 8.6 |
| 2009–10 | Alaska | 58 | 24.8 | .535 | — | .658 | 5.6 | 1.1 | .2 | .7 | 8.3 |
| 2010–11 | Alaska | 42 | 32.2 | .491 | **.667** | .634 | **9.7** | 2.2 | .2 | **1.2** | 11.6 |
| 2011–12 | Alaska | 35 | **36.0** | .455 | .000 | .727 | 8.3 | 2.1 | .4 | **1.2** | **12.5** |
| 2012–13 | Alaska | 53 | 30.6 | .463 | .000 | .619 | 6.3 | 1.9 | .4 | .7 | 10.0 |
| 2013–14 | Alaska | 43 | 32.2 | .466 | .000 | .650 | 7.6 | **2.4** | .4 | .8 | 11.1 |
| 2014–15 | Alaska | 50 | 22.7 | .444 | .000 | .633 | 4.6 | 1.3 | .3 | .5 | 7.4 |
| 2015–16 | Alaska | 60 | 22.8 | .493 | .364 | .687 | 5.0 | 1.6 | .4 | .6 | 8.3 |
| 2016–17 | Alaska | 28 | 21.4 | .409 | .200 | .568 | 4.0 | 1.0 | **.5** | .4 | 7.2 |
| 2017–18 | Alaska | 42 | 17.0 | .423 | .154 | .640 | 3.3 | 1.2 | .2 | .1 | 5.1 |
| 2019 | Alaska | 38 | 17.0 | .450 | .111 | .590 | 3.3 | 1.0 | **.5** | .3 | 6.4 |
| Career | | 712 | 25.4 | .485 | .186 | .661 | 6.0 | 1.4 | .3 | .7 | 8.5 |
