= 2009–10 Alaska Aces season =

PBA Sport Season of the Franchise Alaska Aces 24th

- Head coach: Tim Cone
- General Manager: Joaqui Trillo
- Owner(s): Wilfred Uytengsu

Philippine Cup results
- Record: 13–5 (72.2%)
- Place: 1st (tied)
- Playoff finish: Runner-up

Fiesta Conference results
- Record: 11–7 (61.1%)
- Place: 4th
- Playoff finish: Champions (won 4–0)

Alaska Aces seasons

The 2009–10 Alaska Aces season was the 24th season of the franchise in the Philippine Basketball Association (PBA).

== Key dates ==
- August 2: The 2009 PBA Draft took place in Fort Bonifacio, Taguig.

== Draft picks ==
Round	Pick	Player	Height	Position	Nationality	College
1	6	Mike Burtscher	6'6"	Power forward	Switzerland	Clear Water
2	16	Sean Co		Guard	Philippines	Mapúa

== Roster ==
2009–10 Alaska Aces roster
Players

Pos.	#	POB	Name	Height	Weight	DOB (YYYY–MM–DD)	From
C	1	(Philippines)	Samigue Eman	6 ft 9 in (2.06 m)	239 lb (108 kg)		Mindanao
G/F	3	(Philippines)	Cyrus Baguio	6 ft 2 in (1.88 m)	180 lb (82 kg)		UST
G	5	(Philippines)	LA Tenorio	5 ft 8 in (1.73 m)	151 lb (68 kg)		Ateneo
C	7	(Papua New Guinea)	Sonny Thoss	6 ft 7 in (2.01 m)	205 lb (93 kg)		James Cook
G	8	(Philippines)	Kelvin dela Peña	6 ft 0 in (1.83 m)	180 lb (82 kg)		Mapúa
F	10	(Philippines)	Mark Borboran	6 ft 4 in (1.93 m)	180 lb (82 kg)		UE
PG	11	(Philippines)	Topex Robinson	5 ft 7 in (1.70 m)	155 lb (70 kg)		San Sebastian
G/F	12	(Philippines)	Larry Fonacier	6 ft 2 in (1.88 m)	170 lb (77 kg)		Ateneo
F	21	(Philippines)	Reynel Hugnatan	6 ft 4 in (1.93 m)	210 lb (95 kg)		Manila
G	22	(Philippines)	Jeffrey Cariaso (C)	6 ft 1 in (1.85 m)	180 lb (82 kg)		Sonoma State
G	24	(United States)	Brandon Cablay	6 ft 0 in (1.83 m)	165 lb (75 kg)		Vanguard
C	30	(Philippines)	Ervin Sotto	6 ft 7 in (2.01 m)	210 lb (95 kg)		Saint Francis of Assisi
F	35	(United States)	Tony dela Cruz	6 ft 4 in (1.93 m)	209 lb (95 kg)		UC Irvine
F/C	38	(United States)	Joe Devance	6 ft 7 in (2.01 m)	220 lb (100 kg)		UTEP
F	63	(Switzerland)	Michael Burtscher	6 ft 6 in (1.98 m)	220 lb (100 kg)		San Beda

Coaches
Head coach
- (United States) Tim Cone (James Madison)
Assistant(s)
- (Philippines) Joel Banal (Mapúa)
- (Philippines) Richard Bachmann (De La Salle)
- (Philippines) Jojo Lastimosa (Ateneo)
- (Philippines) Luigi Trillo (De La Salle)

Legend
- (DP) Unsigned draft pick
- (FA) Free agent
- (S) Suspended
- Injured

== Philippine Cup ==
=== Eliminations ===
==== Standings ====
Pos	Team	W	L	PCT	GB	Qualification
1	Alaska Aces	13	5	.722 (Note: Head-to-head record: Alaska 2–0 San Miguel)	—	Advance to semifinals
2	San Miguel Beermen	13	5	.722	—	Advance to semifinals
3	Purefoods Tender Juicy Giants	12	6	.667 (Note: Head-to-head record: Purefoods 1–1 Barangay Ginebra; Purefoods 0, Barangay Ginebra 0; overall point differential: Purefoods +85, Barangay Ginebra +75)	1	Advance to quarterfinals
4	Barangay Ginebra Kings	12	6	.667	1	Advance to quarterfinals
5	Talk 'N Text Tropang Texters	11	7	.611	2	Advance to quarterfinals
6	Sta. Lucia Realtors	10	8	.556	3	Advance to wildcard round
7	Coca-Cola Tigers	6	12	.333 (Note: Head-to-head record: Burger King 1–1, Coca-Cola; Burger King +10, Coca-Cola −10)	7	Advance to wildcard round
8	Burger King Whoppers	6	12	.333	7	Advance to wildcard round
9	Rain or Shine Elasto Painters	4	14	.222	9	Advance to wildcard round
10	Barako Bull Energy Boosters	3	15	.167	10	
—	Smart Gilas (G)	3	6	.333	5.5	Guest team (Note: Smart Gilas's results do not count in the standings.)

Source: PBA.ph
(G) Guests

==== Game log ====
===== Eliminations =====
2009–10 PBA Philippine Cup game log
October

Game	Date	Opponent	Score	High points	High rebounds	High assists	Location Attendance	Record
1	October 14	Barako Bull	99–82	Miller (19)	Miller (11)	Miller (12)	Araneta Coliseum	1–0
2	October 17	San Miguel	85–74	Miller (25)	Miller (10)	Miller, Tenorio, dela Cruz (3)	Panabo, Davao del Norte	2–0
3	October 23	Coca Cola	100–79	Tenorio (17)	Miller, dela Cruz (10)	Tenorio, Hugnatan, dela Cruz (4)	Cuneta Astrodome	3–0
4	October 25	Barangay Ginebra	105–96	Hugnatan (26)	Thoss (10)	Cariaso (3)	Araneta Coliseum	4–0

November

Game	Date	Opponent	Score	High points	High rebounds	High assists	Location Attendance	Record
5	November 4	Sta. Lucia	91–83	Miller (19)	Devance (11)	Tenorio (6)	Araneta Coliseum	5–0
6	November 6	Burger King	87–73	Miller (19)	Tenorio (10)	Cablay (5)	Cuneta Astrodome	6–0
7	November 13	Rain or Shine	81–86	Devance (24)	Miller (11)	Thoss (4)	Ynares Center	6–1
8	November 20	Talk 'N Text	110–106	Miller (20)	Miller, dela Cruz (7)	Tenorio (6)	Araneta Coliseum	7–1
9	November 22	Purefoods	101–87	Tenorio (24)	dela Cruz (7)	Tenorio, 2 others (4)	Araneta Coliseum	8–1
10	November 29	Barako Bull	99–88	Hugnatan (17)	Hugnatan (10)	Miller (11)	Ynares Sports Arena	9–1

December

Game	Date	Opponent	Score	High points	High rebounds	High assists	Location Attendance	Record
11	December 9	San Miguel	122–116 (OT)	Tenorio (27)	Hugnatan (11)	Devance (7)	Araneta Coliseum	10–1
12	December 16	Talk 'N Text	119–113 (OT)	Miller (22)	Devance, Tenorio (8)	Tenorio (5)	Araneta Coliseum	11–1
13	December 20	Coca Cola	92–103	Miller (17)	Hugnatan (8)	Devance, Tenorio (4)	Araneta Coliseum	11–2

January

Game	Date	Opponent	Score	High points	High rebounds	High assists	Location Attendance	Record
14	January 9	Barangay Ginebra	90–93	Miller (29)	dela Cruz (8)	Miller, Fonacier (4)	Batangas City	11–3
15	January 13	Sta. Lucia	85–77	Devance (17)	Thoss (14)	Hugnatan (6)	Araneta Coliseum	12–3
16	January 15	Purefoods	77–94	Devance (14)	Devance (8)	Miller (5)	Araneta Coliseum	12–4
17	January 20	Burger King	80–87	Miller (19)	Devance (11)	Devance (6)	Ynares Center	12–5
18	January 22	Rain or Shine	95–94	Miller (23)	Hugnatan, Thoss (11)	Tenorio (6)	Ynares Center	13–5

2009–10 schedule

===== Playoffs =====
2010 PBA Philippine Cup playoffs game log
Semifinals

Game	Date	Opponent	Score	High points	High rebounds	High assists	Location Attendance	Record
1	February 10	Barangay Ginebra	104–79	Thoss (21)	Devance (18)	Tenorio (6)	Araneta Coliseum	1–0
2	February 12	Barangay Ginebra	90–82	Miller (18)	dela Cruz (16)	Miller (7)	Cuneta Astrodome	2–0
3	February 14	Barangay Ginebra	91–88	Tenorio, dela Cruz (15)	dela Cruz (15)	Tenorio (4)	Araneta Coliseum	3–0
4	February 17	Barangay Ginebra	102–95	Tenorio (20)	Hugnatan (10)	Tenorio (10)	Araneta Coliseum	4–0

Finals

Game	Date	Opponent	Score	High points	High rebounds	High assists	Location Attendance	Record
1	February 24	Purefoods	77–81	Miller (23)	Thoss (14)	Hugnatan, Miller (4)	Araneta Coliseum	0–1
2	February 26	Purefoods	85–86	Tenorio (19)	Devance (10)	Miller, Tenorio (5)	Araneta Coliseum	0–2
3	February 28	Purefoods	78–79	Miller (20)	Devance (10)	Miller, Tenorio (5)	Araneta Coliseum	0–3
4	March 3	Purefoods	76–86	Thoss (19)	Thoss (12)	Tenorio (6)	Araneta Coliseum	0–4

2009–10 schedule

== Fiesta Conference ==
=== Eliminations ===
==== Standings ====
Pos	Team	W	L	PCT	GB	Qualification
1	Talk 'N Text Tropang Texters	15	3	.833	—	Advance to semifinals
2	San Miguel Beermen	13	5	.722 (Note: Second seed playoff: San Miguel 88, Derby Ace 83)	2	Advance to semifinals
3	Derby Ace Llamados	13	5	.722	2	Advance to quarterfinals
4	Alaska Aces	11	7	.611	4	Advance to quarterfinals
5	Barangay Ginebra Kings	9	9	.500 (Note: Fifth seed playoff: Barangay Ginebra 115, Rain or Shine 88)	6	Advance to quarterfinals
6	Rain or Shine Elasto Painters	9	9	.500	6	Advance to wildcard round
7	Coca-Cola Tigers	8	10	.444	7	Advance to wildcard round
8	Sta. Lucia Realtors	5	13	.278	10	Advance to wildcard round
9	Air21 Express	4	14	.222	11	Advance to wildcard round
10	Barako Energy Coffee Masters	3	15	.167	12	

Source: PBA.ph

== Transactions ==
=== Pre-season ===
Alaska Aces

Players Added

Via Draft

- Mike Burtscher
- Sean Co

Via Free Agency

- Ariel Capus
Players Lost

=== Fiesta Conference ===
==== Trades ====
April 28, 2010	To Alaska Cyrus Baguio	To Barangay Ginebra Willie Miller

==== Imports recruited ====
Team	Player	Debuted	Final
Alaska Aces	Diamon Simpson (1/1)	April 7, 2010	August 18, 2010
