= Brandon Cablay =

Filipino-American basketball player

Personal information
- Born: March 1, 1978 (age 48) Kealakekua, Hawaii, U.S.
- Listed height: 6 ft 0 in (1.83 m)
- Listed weight: 165 lb (75 kg)

Career information
- College: Vanguard University
- PBA draft: 2003: 1st round, 5th overall pick
- Drafted by: Alaska Aces
- Playing career: 2003–2012
- Position: Shooting guard
- Number: 24

Career history
- 2003–2006: Alaska Aces
- 2006–2007: San Miguel Beermen
- 2007–2008: Purefoods Tender Juicy Giants
- 2009–2012: Alaska Aces

Career highlights
- 2× PBA champion (2003 Invitational, 2010 Fiesta); PBA Finals MVP (2003 Invitational); PBA All-Star (2005); PBA Slam Dunk champion (2003)

Brandon Lee Kaui Cablay (born March 1, 1978) is a Filipino-American former professional basketball player.

He started his career in the PBA in 2003 as a member of the Aces. He would win his first PBA championship in the 2003 PBA Invitational Conference, wherein Cablay was named Finals MVP. He was acquired by the San Miguel Beermen from the Aces in exchange for Nic Belasco.

== PBA career statistics ==
Legend
GP	Games played	MPG	Minutes per game
FG%	Field-goal percentage	3P%	3-point field-goal percentage	FT%	Free-throw percentage
RPG	Rebounds per game	APG	Assists per game	SPG	Steals per game
BPG	Blocks per game	PPG	Points per game	**Bold**	Career high

=== Season-by-season averages ===
Year	Team	GP	MPG	FG%	3P%	FT%	RPG	APG	SPG	BPG	PPG
2003	Alaska	52	24.3	.427	.333	.685	2.7	1.5	**.7**	.2	7.9
2004–05	Alaska	**60**	**34.7**	.454	.336	.706	**4.0**	**3.0**	.6	**.3**	**12.2**
2005–06	Alaska	21	26.6	.367	.343	.567	3.7	2.0	.6	.1	7.9
2005–06	San Miguel	23	21.3	.344	.228	.609	2.1	2.0	.5	.1	4.8
2006–07	San Miguel	26	23.9	.407	.274	.711	2.6	1.5	.4	.0	7.3
2007–08	Purefoods	11	14.0	.359	.292	.500	1.8	.8	.3	.1	3.6
2008–09	Alaska	11	13.0	.350	.000	.667	1.0	.6	.4	.1	3.8
2009–10	Alaska	27	9.2	.387	**.433**	.500	.9	.9	.2	.1	2.4
2010–11	Alaska	24	13.3	.276	.143	.733	1.5	.8	.3	.0	2.7
2011–12	Alaska	12	14.8	.362	.269	**.818**	1.3	.9	.6	.1	4.2
2012–13	Alaska	2	10.0	**.500**	.250	—	1.0	1.5	.0	.0	3.5
Career		269	22.6	.409	.289	.681	2.5	1.7	.5	.1	7.0
