= Reynel Hugnatan =

Filipino basketball player

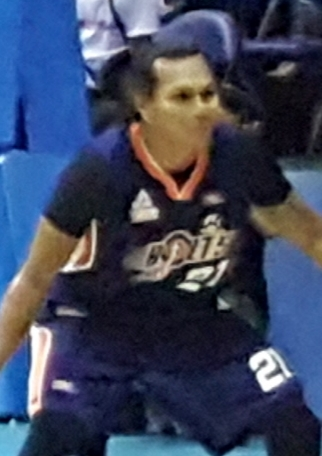
- Hugnatan in 2016

No. 21 – San Juan Knights
- Position: Power forward / center
- League: MPBL

Personal information
- Born: November 3, 1978 (age 48) Bacolod, Philippines
- Listed height: 6 ft 4 in (1.93 m)
- Listed weight: 210 lb (95 kg)

Career information
- College: UM
- PBA draft: 2003: 1st round, 9th overall pick
- Drafted by: Coca-Cola Tigers
- Playing career: 1998–present
- Coaching career: 2023–present

Career history

Playing
- 1998–2002: Negros / RCPI-Negros Slashers
- 2003–2005: Coca-Cola Tigers
- 2005–2011: Alaska Aces
- 2011–2023: Meralco Bolts
- 2023–2024: MisOr Mustangs
- 2024–present: San Juan Knights / Kings

Coaching
- 2023–present: Meralco Bolts (assistant)

Career highlights
- As player: 3× PBA champion (2003 Reinforced, 2007 Fiesta, 2010 Fiesta); 6× PBA All-Star (2005–2006, 2008–2010, 2015); PBA 5,000 Points Club member; As assistant coach: PBA champion (2024 Philippine); PBA Baby Dalupan Coach of the Year (2024)

Reynel Frances T. Hugnatan (born November 3, 1978) is a Filipino professional basketball player for the San Juan Knights of the Maharlika Pilipinas Basketball League (MPBL). He also serves as an assistant coach for the Meralco Bolts of the Philippine Basketball Association (PBA). He was picked 9th overall by the Coca-Cola Tigers in the 2003 PBA draft.

On May 12, 2023, Hugnatan retired from professional basketball and later became an assistant coach for the Bolts. In November 2023, however, he would un-retire to suit up for the MisOr Mustangs.

== Early life and college career ==
Hugnatan was born in Bacolod. He grew up in Talisay, a municipality in Negros Occidental. His father was a truck driver, and his family also ran a small farm. He worked as a sakada, an itinerant field worker in sugarcane fields.

Hugnatan played for the University of Manila Hawks at the high school level for two years. He also played for them in the collegiate level under head coach Ato Tolentino but only stayed there for one year.

== Professional career ==
=== Negros / RCPI-Negros Slashers ===
In 1998, when he was 19 years old, Hugnatan joined the Negros Slashers of the Metropolitan Basketball Association (MBA). Negros offered him a ₱15,000 monthly salary to play for them. He and John Ferriols helped lead Negros to the top of the Southern Conference.

In 1999, he participated in the MBA's All-Star Dunk Contest, where he outperformed Don Camaso and rivaled Filipino-American Matt Mitchell in the event's finals.

The Slashers entered the 2000 season with a smaller lineup. Despite their small lineup, they made it to the finals. Hugnatan then missed Game 6 of the finals due to a fever. Without him, Negros lost to the San Juan Knights.

Once again, Negros made it to the finals in the 2001 season. In Game 3 against the LBC Batangas Blades, Hugnatan had a double-double of 20 points and a career-high 21 rebounds to extend the series 2–1. However, Batangas won the following game and Negros lost in the finals once again. That season, he unanimously won the league's Most Improved Player award.

In the 2002 quarterfinals, Hugnatan and Dino Aldeguer both scored 19 points against the Osaka Pangasinan Waves to bring Negros to the semifinals. He then led Negros past the Davao Eagles with 31 points and 14 rebounds. Then he helped lead the Slashers to a finals sweep of LBC Batangas with averages of 19 points and 10.3 rebounds.

Soon after the 2002 season ended, the MBA folded up. With the disbandment of the league, Hugnatan and other MBA players applied for the 2003 PBA Draft.

=== Coca-Cola Tigers ===
The Coca-Cola Tigers selected Hugnatan with the ninth pick of the 2003 PBA Draft. He agreed to a two-year contract worth P3.26 million. In his first year, he was used at small forward. In the 2003 Reinforced Conference, he scored 12 points in a win over the Alaska Aces. That conference, they made it to the finals, where they won the title in seven games.

Hugnatan competed in the 2004 Slam Dunk Contest during All-Star Weekend, losing to Cyrus Baguio in the finals.

=== Alaska Aces ===
==== 2004–06 seasons: New team ====
During the 2004–05 Philippine Cup, Hugnatan, along with Jeffrey Cariaso, was traded to the Alaska Aces for Ali Peek and John Arigo. In his Alaska debut, he led them in scoring with 21 points, but they lost to the San Miguel Beermen. He scored seven of his 15 points in the fourth quarter of a win over the Barangay Ginebra Kings. The Aces secured the fourth seed for that conference. In a 2005 Fiesta Conference loss to the Talk 'N Text Phone Pals, he scored 15 points. That conference, they failed to make it to the semifinals as they were eliminated by Red Bull Barako in the quarterfinals.

During the 2006 Philippine Cup, Hugnatan made two game-winning free throws with 10 seconds remaining in their game against Red Bull. He then scored a conference-high 16 points off the bench in a win over the Beermen. With the win, they secured a slot in the quarterfinals. In Game 3 of the quarterfinals, he fractured his nose. Still, he played in Game 4, and led the team with 16 points and into the semifinals. He then underwent surgery for his nose fracture.

==== 2006–08 seasons: 2nd championship ====
An ACL tear kept Hugnatan out for the entire 2006–07 Philippine Cup. He made his return during the 2007 Fiesta Conference. In Game 2 of the Fiesta Conference semis against the Beermen, he contributed 13 points as they got to a 2–0 series lead. In Game 6, he had a double-double of 16 points and a PBA career-high 17 rebounds and also made three clutch free throws as the Aces made it to the finals. In Game 2 of the finals, he contributed a double-double of 13 points and 10 rebounds as the Aces got to a 2–0 series lead over Talk 'N Text. In Game 7, he scored 16 points and made a clutch free throw to give the Aces the championship; the Aces' first since the 2000 All-Filipino Cup.

In a win over Coca-Cola during the 2007–08 Philippine Cup, Hugnatan scored 17 points to go along with 16 rebounds. In a win over Red Bull, he scored 18 points to go with eight rebounds. The Aces made it to the quarterfinals where in a Game 1 win over Coca-Cola he contributed 17 points. That season, he was selected as an All-Star for the 2008 All-Star Weekend, which was held in his hometown of Bacolod City.

==== 2008–10 seasons: 3rd championship ====
In a 2008–09 Philippine Cup win over Red Bull, Hugnatan had a double-double of 12 points and 11 rebounds. He then made a clutch putback with 21 seconds remaining to give Alaska a win over the Rain or Shine Elasto Painters. Alaska made it to the finals of that conference, where they held leads of 2–0 and 3–2 against Talk 'N Text. However, they lost their last two games and Talk 'N Text won the championship.

Alaska started the 2009–10 Philippine Cup with a win over the Barako Bull Energy Boosters in which Hugnatan scored 18 points and six rebounds. He then led them with 20 points off the bench in a win over Ginebra. For his performances he won a Player of the Week award alongside Talk 'N Text's Mac Cardona. He then contributed 16 points and eight rebounds as they won their sixth straight game. In a rematch against Barako he led the team with 17 points and 10 rebounds as Alaska had its best start in 11 years with a record of 9–1. Alaska made it all the way to the finals once again, but he struggled with turnovers and they got swept by the Purefoods Tender Juicy Giants. That season, he got to play in the All-Star game.

In a Game 1 win of the 2010 Fiesta Conference semifinals against Talk 'N Text, Hugnatan scored all of his 16 points in the third quarter off the bench. After the series went the distance, Alaska returned to the finals. There they bounced back and won the 2010 Fiesta Conference championship over the Beermen.

=== Meralco Bolts ===
==== 2011–12 seasons: First seasons with Meralco ====
On February 15 2011, during the 2011 Commissioner's Cup, the Meralco Bolts acquired Hugnatan in exchange for Hans Thiele and Paolo Bugia.

Hugnatan missed time during the 2011–12 Philippine Cup due to a knee injury. He returned to the lineup against Alaska. In the 2012 Commissioner's Cup, he scored 16 points in a win over Rain or Shine. In the Governor's Cup, he scored 18 points in a loss to Ginebra. That conference saw Meralco making it to the semifinals as he scored 14 against the Powerade Tigers. They had a 6–8 record in the semifinals, where their season ended.

==== 2012–15 seasons: Final All-Star appearance ====
In the 2012–13 Philippine Cup, Hugnatan led Meralco to the fourth seed. His best game in the eliminations came in a win over the San Mig Coffee Mixers in which he had 15 points and nine rebounds. However they were swept in the quarterfinals by Alaska. They were also eliminated in the quarterfinals in the following conference, the Commissioner's Cup. In the Governors' Cup, Meralco started with a record of 4–2 and in second place in the standings. Although they fell to third place, they were able to beat the sixth-seeded Barako Bull in the quarterfinals behind Hugnatan's 18 points, 12 rebounds, four assists and two blocks. In the semifinals, they fell to San Mig once again. That season, he was in the running for Most Improved Player, but lost to Jervy Cruz.

In a 2013–14 Philippine Cup loss to San Mig, Hugnatan scored 16 points with eight rebounds. That conference Meralco didn't make the playoffs as they lost to Alaska for the eighth seed. They got their revenge in the following conferences as they beat Alaska in the Commissioner's Cup and in the Governors' Cup.

During the 2014–15 Philippine Cup, Hugnatan scored a career-high 28 points on 9-of-15 shooting in a double overtime win over Barako. He then missed time due to a knee sprain. At age 36, he made his sixth All-Star appearance, with only Jimmy Alapag (37) and Asi Taulava (42) older All-Stars than him. After the All-Star break he had 21 points on 9-of-14 shooting in a win over Barako. In the Governors' Cup, he held 7 ft tall center Greg Slaughter to two points in the fourth quarter after he had scored 19 points through the first three quarters, leading to a win over Ginebra. He then made a clutch three pointer in a win over the Beermen.

==== 2015–17: Meralco's first Finals appearances ====
Meralco started the 2015–16 season miserably as they lost almost all of their games in the 2015–16 Philippine Cup with a record of 1–11. They bounced back in the Commissioner's Cup as they qualified for the quarterfinals. In the quarterfinals against the NLEX Road Warriors, Hugnatan scored a conference-high 20 points with seven rebounds in 29 minutes off the bench. In Game One of their semis against Alaska, he had 21 points on 8-of-13 shooting, six rebounds, and four assists, in 31 minutes but they lost. Alaska went on to eliminate Meralco from making the finals.

In a 2016 Governors' Cup loss to Ginebra, Hugnatan scored 18 points off the bench. He broke out in their semis against the TNT KaTropa, scoring 21 points on 5-of-6 from three in Game 3. For that performance he earned a Player of the Week award. He then contributed 16 points as Meralco made its first Finals appearance in franchise history. In Game 1 of the finals he contributed 15 points but his team lost to Ginebra. He then scored 17 points and made three clutch triples as they took a 2–1 series lead. However Ginebra would overcome that deficit and win the finals in six games.

Hugnatan had impressive performances for the month of January 2017 throughout the 2016–17 Philippine Cup, including a season-high 28 points against the Mahindra Floodbuster, but they lost six straight games in that conference. It was a different story in the Governors' Cup as they started the conference with four straight wins. Against NLEX he scored 25 points off the bench, but they lost that game and snapped their winning streak. Meralco made it back to the Finals of the Governors' Cup for the second year in a row, where they faced Ginebra once again. In Game 3, stepping up for the injured Ranidel De Ocampo, he made seven triples for 22 points to prevent Ginebra from taking a 3–0 series lead. He then made a game-winning assist to Allen Durham in Game 4 to tie the series. However, Ginebra closed out the series and Meralco was denied of the championship once again.

==== 2017–2019 seasons: 5,000 points ====
In a loss to NLEX during the 2017–18 Philippine Cup, Hugnatan scored 10 points and became the 88th player in league history to achieve 5,000 career points. In the Governor's Cup, Meralco lost six straight games and was in danger of missing the playoffs. In their game against the Magnolia Hotshots, he scored 12 of his 15 points in the second half as they started a winning streak. On November 30, 2018, his 40th birthday, he scored 13 points in a win over the Beermen, assuring Meralco of a playoff for the 8th seed. Meralco eventually qualified for the playoffs as the seventh seed, where they upset the second-seed Phoenix Fuel Masters. In Game 2 of their semifinal series against Alaska, he contributed 12 points and seven rebounds as Meralco tied the series. In Game 3, he scored 19 points, five rebounds and five assists, but missed a putback that could have sent the game into overtime. Alaska won that game and then closed out the series, preventing Meralco from reaching its third straight Governors' Cup Finals.

During the 2019 season, Hugnatan scored a season-high 16 points in a loss to Rain or Shine. Meralco made the Governors' Cup finals once again, but lost to Ginebra once again for the third time in four seasons.

==== 2020 season: Resurgence in the bubble ====
That season, the PBA was held in a specially created "bubble" isolation zone in Angeles City. In his first game in the bubble, Hugnatan scored 16 points in a loss to Phoenix. A day after celebrating his 42nd birthday, he scored 14 points in a win over the Blackwater Elite. He suffered a groin strain in their match against TNT, but was able to return to the lineup in time for Meralco's quarterfinals series. In Game 1 of their quarterfinals against San Miguel Beer, he led with 16 points, seven rebounds, two assists, and two steals as they forced a do-or-die game. Meralco won the next game, extending their playoff run and setting them up for a run-in with Ginebra in the semis. Ginebra led 2–1 in their best-of-five series but Meralco forced another do-or-die game with him making a go-ahead jumper with 15.1 seconds left and clutch plays by his teammates sealing the win. He finished that game with a game-high 19 points, along with four rebounds and four assists. In Game 5, he made a game-tying triple in the final seconds of the game, but this was supplanted by Scottie Thompson's game-winning triple from the corner, ending Meralco's playoff run. Although Meralco failed to make the finals, this was still their best Philippine Cup campaign in franchise history.

For that season, he averaged 11.7 points, 4.8 rebounds and 2.3 assists, more than doubling his averages in the previous season. That and his role in Meralco's semifinals run made him a candidate for the Most Improved Player award. Had he won, he would have been the oldest player to ever win the award. Instead, the award went to Prince Caperal.

==== 2021–23 seasons: Final seasons in the PBA ====
For his impressive play the previous season, Hugnatan earned a contract extension. To begin the 2021 Philippine Cup, he scored 13 points in a win over the Beermen. He left the team near the end of the elimination round to attend the wake of his mother back home. He was able to return to the team in time for the playoffs. In the quarterfinals, he helped Meralco break away from NLEX in the fourth quarter, and Meralco made it back to the semis to face Magnolia. In Game 4, he had 21 points and nine rebounds but they still lost to Magnolia. Although Meralco won Game 5, Magnolia eventually defeated them in Game 6.

In the 2022 Philippine Cup, Hugnatan helped Meralco score its first win of the conference by scoring 10 of his 17 points in the third quarter of their game against Phoenix.

On May 12, 2023, head coach Luigi Trillo announced that Hugnatan had retired from professional basketball and would become an assistant coach for the Bolts.

=== MisOr Mustangs ===
In December 2023, Hugnatan came out of retirement to play for the MisOr Mustangs in the Pilipinas Super League (PSL) President's Cup. Before doing so, he asked permission from Meralco and from PBA commissioner Willie Marcial. He debuted for MisOr with 10 points. He then scored 19 points on 8-for-12 shooting, five rebounds, and two assists in a win over Bicol. They were eliminated in the first round by the Davao Occidental Tigers.

=== San Juan Knights ===
In 2024, with Meralco's blessing, Hugnatan joined the San Juan Knights in the MPBL.

== Coaching career ==
=== Meralco Bolts ===
Beginning in the 2023–24 season, Hugnatan became an assistant coach for Meralco. He is tasked with developing Meralco's frontcourt players. In his first year as an assistant coach, the Bolts won the 2024 Philippine Cup.

== National team career ==
In 2002, Hugnatan and a selection of MBA All-Stars represented the Philippines in the Jones Cup. He scored 17 points in a win over the Russian selection.

In 2018, Hugnatan and the Meralco Bolts represented the Philippines in the 2018 FIBA Asia Champions Cup while the 2018 Governors' Cup was ongoing, settling for fourth place.

== Player profile ==
Coach Tim Cone once called him a "perfect power forward" as he could shoot, hustle, rebound, and defend. He also compared him to Ranidel De Ocampo as both could shoot, post up, and defend. Early in his career he could play both forward positions and center as he could defend both the perimeter and the post. At Meralco, he often played at power forward but he also played as an undersized center when needed.

Hugnatan is ambidextrous, and shoots left-handed. He has good footwork in the post. He can shoot from midrange and is good at making free throws in the clutch.

Late into his career Hugnatan developed into a three-point shooter. Before the 2015–16 season, he had only made 12 threes in his career, although several came in high-pressure situations. In the 2016 PBA Governors' Cup he revealed his new skill as he shot 38.3% from three and made 23 triples throughout the conference.

== PBA career statistics ==
Legend
GP	Games played	MPG	Minutes per game
FG%	Field-goal percentage	3P%	3-point field-goal percentage	FT%	Free-throw percentage
RPG	Rebounds per game	APG	Assists per game	SPG	Steals per game
BPG	Blocks per game	PPG	Points per game	**Bold**	Career high

=== Season-by-season averages ===
Year	Team	GP	MPG	FG%	3P%	FT%	RPG	APG	SPG	BPG	PPG
2003	Coca-Cola	58	14.1	.448	—	.680	3.1	.8	.2	.1	3.7
2004–05	Coca-Cola	**72**	27.4	.489	.143	.697	6.2	1.5	**.5**	.2	8.6
2004–05	Alaska	**72**	27.4	.489	.143	.697	6.2	1.5	**.5**	.2	8.6
2005–06	Alaska	48	24.1	.500	.000	.650	5.5	1.0	.4	.2	6.9
2006–07	Alaska	35	19.9	**.531**	.000	.641	4.9	.8	.2	.1	7.5
2007–08	Alaska	46	24.8	.451	.333	.695	6.0	1.3	.4	.2	8.8
2008–09	Alaska	44	22.6	.500	.250	.689	6.0	1.2	.3	.1	8.2
2009–10	Alaska	62	20.0	.466	.000	.721	5.1	1.3	.2	.1	7.7
2010–11	Alaska	27	20.6	.453	—	.627	5.9	1.0	.2	.1	6.1
2011–12	Meralco	35	22.3	.509	.000	.769	5.5	.8	.3	.3	6.1
2012–13	Meralco	47	27.3	.465	.000	.789	6.5	1.2	.4	**.4**	9.5
2013–14	Meralco	35	**31.5**	.439	.286	.647	**7.1**	1.4	**.5**	.2	8.7
2014–15	Meralco	38	24.0	.429	.333	.843	4.4	.8	.2	.2	7.7
2015–16	Meralco	50	21.2	.445	**.397**	.831	3.9	1.2	.3	.1	8.6
2016–17	Meralco	48	20.0	.391	.357	.842	3.4	1.2	.3	.3	8.5
2017–18	Meralco	40	18.3	.397	.293	.729	3.2	1.6	.4	.2	6.8
2019	Meralco	34	12.1	.321	.190	**.862**	2.7	.6	.1	.2	3.6
2020	Meralco	16	28.2	.427	.350	.794	4.8	**2.3**	.4	.3	**11.7**
2021	Meralco	29	16.5	.404	.253	.694	2.8	.8	.2	.1	7.1
2022–23	Meralco	21	8.8	.318	.235	.667	1.5	.4	.0	.3	3.4
Career		785	21.6	.448	.298	.718	4.8	1.1	.3	.2	7.4

== Personal life ==
In 2001, Hugnatan's rise in the MBA was featured in a 30-minute special aired by the Japan Broadcasting Corp (NHK).

Hugnatan lives a frugal lifestyle, but indulges himself with travels to different beaches in the country. He also owns a collection of Air Jordans, including 'Just Don' Air Jordan 2s, which he wore in a game before any NBA player did.

Hugnatan's younger brother Roel is also a former basketball player who played for the Adamson Soaring Falcons in college and the KL Dragons in the ASEAN Basketball League. He now manages a trucking business.
