= Mike Reyes =

Filipino basketball coach

FEU Tamaraws
- Title: Assistant coach
- League: UAAP

Career information
- High school: Ateneo de Manila
- College: Ateneo de Manila
- Position: Guard

Career history

Coaching
- ?–1998: Ateneo HS
- 1998: Iloilo Megavoltz
- 2000–2001: Pop Cola Panthers (assistant)
- 2002–2005: Coca-Cola Tigers (assistant)
- 2004–2012: University of San Carlos
- 2012–2016: Southwestern University (assistant)
- 2016–2019: Southwestern University
- 2025: Cebu Classic
- 2025–present: FEU (assistant)
- 2025–2026: FEU-D HS

Career highlights
- As head coach: CESAFI champion (2019); UAAP Juniors champions (2025–26); As assistant coach: 2× PBA champion (2002 All-Filipino, 2003 Reinforced); CESAFI champion (2012)

Mike Reyes is a Filipino professional and collegiate basketball coach who is the current assistant coach for the FEU Tamaraws of the University Athletic Association of the Philippines (UAAP). He is the brother of PBA champion coach Chot Reyes.

== Career ==
=== Early days ===
Reyes coached the Ateneo Blue Eaglets in the junior's division of the UAAP until 1998. After his high school stint, Reyes coached the Iloilo Megavoltz in the Metropolitan Basketball Association.

He became an assistant coach to Chot at Pop Cola Panthers (2000 to 2001), and on its successor team Coca-Cola Tigers (2002 to 2005), specified for the role of video coordinator.

=== Cebu collegiate league ===
He later coached the University of San Carlos Carolinians, when he led the team to two consecutive finals appearance in 2006, and 2007, but both lost to the University of the Visayas Green Lancers.

He became an assistant coach and athletic director of Southwestern University Cobras in 2012, and later promoted to head coach in 2016. He led the Cobras into winning the 2019 CESAFI basketball finals.

=== Maharlika Pilipinas Basketball League ===
In 2025, Reyes was appointed as a coach for the returning Cebu franchise in the Maharlika Pilipinas Basketball League.
