= Jeff Cariaso =

Filipino-American basketball player and coach

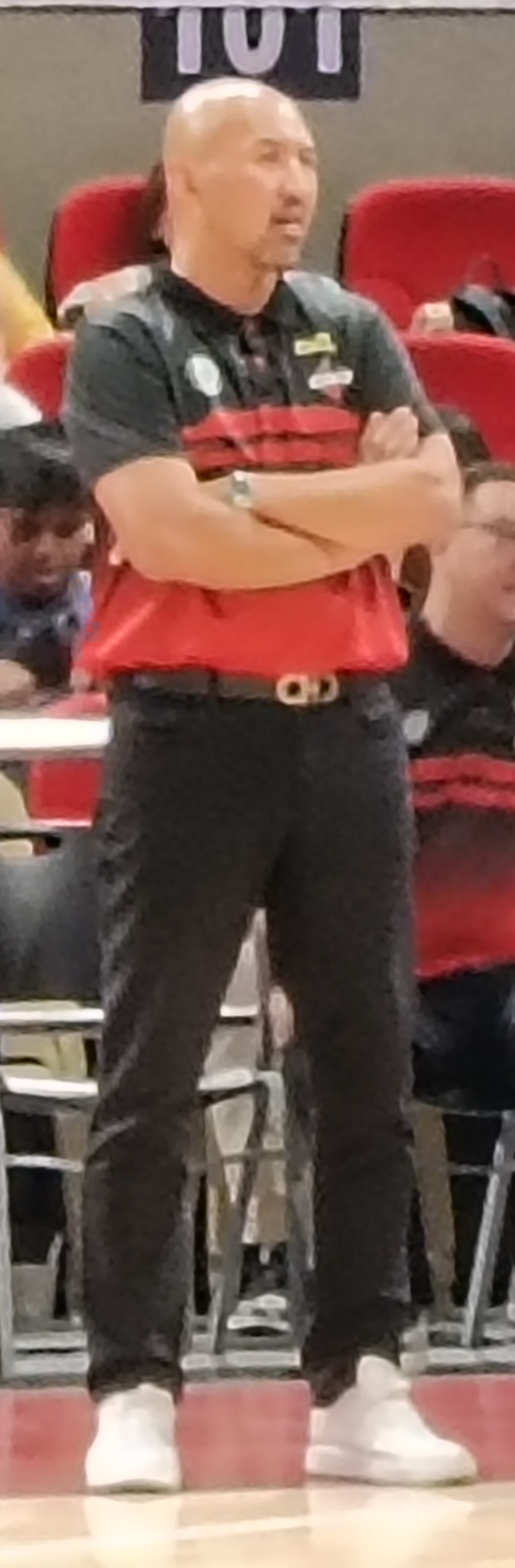
- Cariaso in 2025

Personal information
- Born: September 12, 1972 (age 54) United States
- Listed height: 6 ft 2 in (1.88 m)
- Listed weight: 180 lb (82 kg)

Career information
- College: Sonoma State (1991–1992)
- PBA draft: 1995: 1st round, 6th overall pick
- Drafted by: Alaska Milkmen
- Playing career: 1995–2010
- Position: Shooting guard
- Number: 22
- Coaching career: 2011–present

Career history

Playing
- 1995–1997: Alaska Milkmen / Alaska Aces
- 1997–1999: Mobiline Phone Pals
- 2000–2001: Tanduay Rhum Masters
- 2002–2003: Coca-Cola Tigers
- 2004–2010: Alaska Aces

Coaching
- 2011–2014: B-Meg Llamados / San Mig Super Coffee Mixers (assistant)
- 2014: Barangay Ginebra San Miguel
- 2015–2019: Alaska Aces (assistant)
- 2019–2022: Alaska Aces
- 2022: Converge FiberXers
- 2023–2026: Blackwater Bossing

Career highlights
- As player: 8× PBA champion (1995 Governors', 1996 All-Filipino, 1996 Commissioner's, 1996 Governors', 2002 All-Filipino, 2003 Reinforced, 2007 Fiesta, 2010 Fiesta); PBA Finals MVP (2003 Reinforced); PBA Best Player of the Conference (2002 All-Filipino); 10× PBA All-Star (1995–1997, 1999–2001, 2003–2005); 50 Greatest Players in PBA History (2025 selection); PBA Rookie of the Year (1995); 4× PBA All-Defensive Team (1996, 1997, 2000, 2002); 4× PBA Mythical First Team (1999, 2000, 2002, 2003); PBA Mythical 2nd Team (1996); PBA Grand Slam champion (1996); No. 22 retired by the Alaska Aces and Coca-Cola Tigers; PBL Most Valuable Player (1994 International Invitational); As assistant coach: 4× PBA champion (2012 Commissioner's, 2013 Governors', 2014 Philippine, 2014 Commissioner's)

Jeffrey Joaquin Cariaso (born September 12, 1972) is a Filipino professional basketball coach and former player. He is the former head coach of the Blackwater Bossing of the Philippine Basketball Association (PBA). He also played for various PBA teams, mostly with Alaska, for 15 seasons. He is known as "The Jet". He is also the basketball operations director of Slam magazine in the Philippines.

== Early life and education ==
Jeffrey Cariaso was born in the United States on September 12, 1972 to Alfredo Cariaso of Sampaloc, Manila and Gloria of Batac. He is the eldest of three children. He studied at the Mission High School in San Francisco, California., and later the Sonoma State University. He settled in Manila in 1992.

== Playing career ==
=== Alaska ===
He was first drafted by the Alaska Aces (then known as the Alaska Milkmen) during the 1995 PBA draft as the sixth overall. During his rookie year, he won the Rookie of the Year Award. And in only his second year in the league, he achieved Grand Slam with the Aces where he was instrumental in that championship run, scoring the winning free throws in the All-Filipino Cup final against the Purefoods Hotdogs.

=== Mobiline and Tanduay years ===
Before the start of the 1997 PBA season, Cariaso was traded to the Mobiline Phone Pals (now known as the TNT Tropang Texters) where he was a primary offensive threat for the team. They won the special 1998 Centennial Cup.

After his tenure with Mobiline, he was again sent to the expansion team Tanduay Rhum Masters. He bannered the team alongside Sonny Alvarado, Eric Menk and Rudy Hatfield.

=== Reunion with Johnny Abarrientos ===
After Tanduay folded in 2001, he was then picked by the Coca-Cola Tigers where he got reunited with Johnny Abarrientos. They won a couple of championships which include the 2002 All-Filipino Cup against his former team Alaska and the 2003 Reinforced Conference against San Miguel. He last tasted a championship with Talk 'N Text prior to this. He also received the most number of awards in his career during his tenure with the Tigers. Also, Coca-Cola was the only team that made it to the finals of all three conferences in 2003.

=== Return to Alaska and twilight years ===
In the middle of the 2004–05 PBA season, he along with Reynel Hugnatan were traded back to the Alaska Aces in exchange for all-stars John Arigo and Ali Peek.

Cariaso was the last active player remaining on that Alaska Grand Slam team of 1996.

In the semifinals of the 2010 PBA fiesta conference, he announced his retirement after playing 15 seasons in the league. His number 22 was also retired by the Alaska Aces and the Coca-Cola Tigers.

== Coaching career ==
=== Barangay Ginebra ===
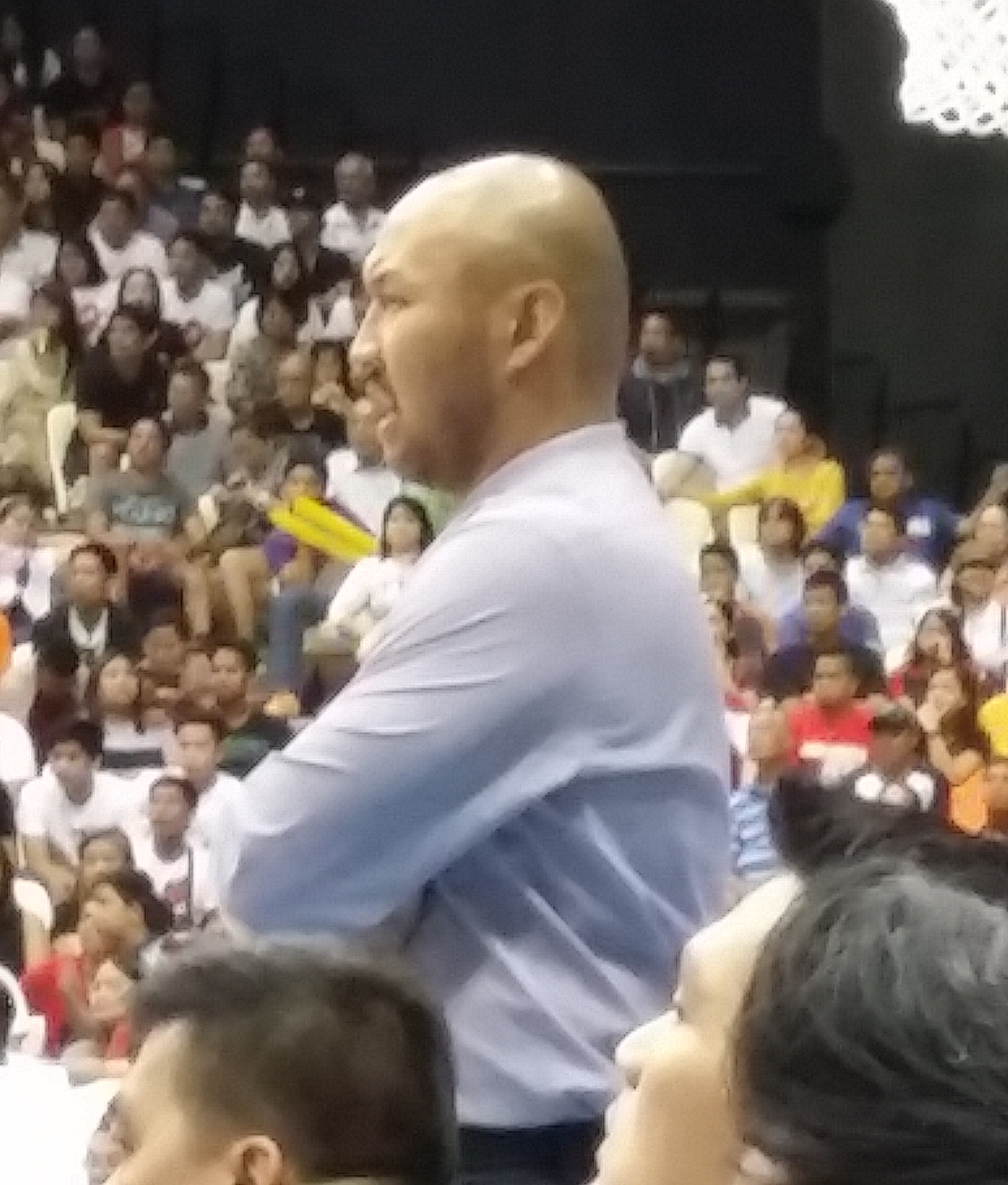
Cariaso in 2014

On April 29, 2014, Cariaso was named as the new head coach of Barangay Ginebra, replacing Ato Agustin. Prior to this, he has no high-level head coaching experience. In fact, he has little coaching experience apart from San Mig Coffee, joining the team in 2011, one year after retiring as a player, to assist his former coach at Alaska, Tim Cone. At San Mig, he emerged as the top assistant, often taking over the reins when Cone was ejected, or when the team was getting blown out and the American coach wanted to send a message to his players. His tenure as coach of the Gin Kings did not produce much success, as the team failed to go beyond the quarterfinal rounds in the 2014 Governors' Cup and in the 2014–15 Philippine Cup. Moreover, the triangle offense system he uses did not sit well with the players. At the end of their Philippine Cup campaign, he was relieved of his coaching duties and was replaced by Ato Agustin. He still has one year and two conferences left in his contract, which was bought out, paving the way to his return to Alaska as assistant coach and camp director.

=== Converge FiberXers ===
On August 9, 2022, after just one conference, Cariaso was released from his position.

=== Blackwater Bossing ===
Blackwater Bossing announced that they have signed a three-year contract Cariaso in April 2023. His first PBA tournament with Blackwater was the 2024 Philippine Cup

In April 2026, Cariaso has been relieved of his post in the middle of the 2026 Commissioner's Cup with Patrick Aquino named as interim head coach of Blackwater.

== Personal life ==
Cariaso's first wife is Michelle, a physical therapist whom he met in 1997 as part of the same coaching staff of the Mobiline Phone Pals. The couple had four children (two of which are his stepchildren). Their marriage ended in a divorce, four years prior to Cariaso meeting his second wife.

He later married sports news reporter and actress Erika Padilla in 2017. They first met each other in 2011 and started dating Padilla in 2014. He has a son and a daughter with Padilla.

== Career statistics ==
Legend
GP	Games played	MPG	Minutes per game
FG%	Field-goal percentage	3P%	3-point field-goal percentage	FT%	Free-throw percentage
RPG	Rebounds per game	APG	Assists per game	SPG	Steals per game
BPG	Blocks per game	PPG	Points per game	**Bold**	Career high

Year	Team	GP	MPG	FG%	3P%	FT%	RPG	APG	SPG	BPG	PPG
1995	Alaska	**73**	27.6	.484	.207	.803	3.9	1.5	.7	.1	11.4
1996	Alaska	69	29.6	**.493**	.125	.807	4.3	2.0	.5	.3	11.8
1997	Mobiline	39	38.6	.425	.208	.766	**7.0**	4.0	**1.0**	.1	18.7
1998	Mobiline	23	**42.3**	.449	.091	.729	6.8	**5.1**	.9	**.4**	18.2
1999	Mobiline	35	36.1	.398	.318	.789	5.2	3.8	.7	.3	13.2
2000	Tanduay	44	37.0	.383	.222	.771	5.2	4.5	.7	.2	14.6
2001	Tanduay	35	36.3	.427	.299	.812	5.1	3.1	.7	.2	18.4
2002	Coca-Cola	12	28.0	.422	**.392**	.679	3.3	3.3	**1.0**	.2	**19.2**
2003	Coca-Cola	65	33.0	.405	.232	.841	4.3	3.7	.8	.1	15.4
2004–05	Coca-Cola	71	34.0	.418	.377	**.866**	4.6	3.9	.7	.1	15.8
2004–05	Alaska	71	34.0	.418	.377	**.866**	4.6	3.9	.7	.1	15.8
2005–06	Alaska	49	34.7	.414	.288	.797	4.7	3.1	.6	.1	12.5
2006–07	Alaska	45	34.2	.445	.308	**.866**	4.6	3.0	.6	.0	13.1
2007–08	Alaska	45	29.6	.400	.349	.763	4.3	3.0	.6	.1	10.4
2008–09	Alaska	40	21.6	.399	.275	.774	2.9	2.1	.3	.0	7.1
2009–10	Alaska	41	10.8	.356	.111	.696	1.3	1.1	.1	.1	2.8
Career		686	31.3	.426	.296	.802	4.4	3.0	.6	.1	13.1
