= Rudy Hatfield =

Filipino-American basketball player

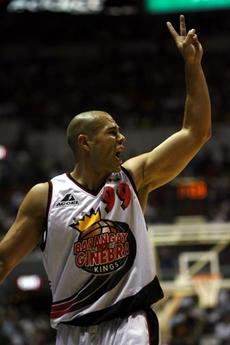

Personal information
- Born: September 13, 1977 (age 49) Detroit, Michigan, U.S.
- Listed height: 6 ft 3 in (1.91 m)
- Listed weight: 205 lb (93 kg)

Career information
- High school: Livonia, Churchill
- College: Michigan–Dearborn (1996–1998)
- PBA draft: 2000: direct hire
- Drafted by: Tanduay Rhum Masters
- Playing career: 1999–2013
- Position: Power forward

Career history
- 1999: Laguna Lakers
- 2000: Tanduay Rhum Masters
- 2001: Pop Cola Panthers
- 2002–2005: Coca-Cola Tigers
- 2006–2007, 2010–2011, 2012–2013: Barangay Ginebra Kings / Barangay Ginebra San Miguel

Career highlights
- 3× PBA champion (2002 All-Filipino, 2003 Reinforced, 2006–07 Philippine); PBA All-Filipino Cup Finals MVP (2002); PBA 2003 Reinforced Best Player of the Conference; 3× PBA All-Star (2001, 2003, 2004); PBA Mythical First Team (2003); 2× PBA Mythical Second Team (2000, 2001); PBA Defensive Player of the Year (2003); 2× PBA All-Defensive Team (2002, 2003)

Rudolph Conse "Rudy" Hatfield II (born September 13, 1977) is an American-Filipino former professional basketball player who played for Laguna Lakers in the Metropolitan Basketball Association and for Tanduay Rhum Masters, Pop Cola Panthers, Coca-Cola Tigers and Barangay Ginebra San Miguel in the Philippine Basketball Association (PBA).

== Pro career ==
=== Tanduay ===
After Hatfield's stint with Laguna Lakers in the Metropolitan Basketball Association, he was one of the two former MBA players signed by the Tanduay Rhum Masters beginning the 2000 PBA season. He played secondary role to Eric Menk and Sonny Alvarado.

=== Pop Cola and Coca-Cola ===
Hatfield was obtained by Pop Cola the following season in a trade with Noli Locsin which involved two other players. He turned into Pop Cola's most reliable frontline player as he made it to the Mythical Second Team for the second straight year. Hatfield finished 14th in scoring with 13 points per game average.

After playing for the Pop Cola Panthers, Hatfield was acquired by the Coca-Cola Tigers in 2002 and played with All-Stars Jeffrey Cariaso and Johnny Abarrientos. He became a power player here and helped the team win the 2002 All-Filipino Cup and the 2003 Reinforced Conference. He had a number of awards that include the Mythical and All-Defensive teams. He was also an All-Star in 2003.

While in the Tigers in 2003, his citizenship were questioned, but later proven with Filipino blood. He missed the 2004 PBA All-Star Weekend due to injury.

He played for the Tigers until 2006.

=== Ginebra ===
Hatfield played for Ginebra from 2006 and known for being the team's hustle-man, being reliable on defense and rebounding. He helped to the team to reach the 2007 Philippine Cup finals, defeating San Miguel Beermen in six games. He played for the team until 2013.

== PBA career statistics ==
Legend
GP	Games played	MPG	Minutes per game
FG%	Field-goal percentage	3P%	3-point field-goal percentage	FT%	Free-throw percentage
RPG	Rebounds per game	APG	Assists per game	SPG	Steals per game
BPG	Blocks per game	PPG	Points per game	**Bold**	Career high

=== Season-by-season averages ===
Year	Team	GP	MPG	FG%	3P%	FT%	RPG	APG	SPG	BPG	PPG
2000	Tanduay	43	37.6	**.544**	.250	.617	9.5	2.1	1.0	.4	13.3
2001	Pop Cola	51	**42.0**	.441	.206	**.665**	**12.4**	2.5	1.5	**.5**	13.0
2002	Coca-Cola	17	32.3	.398	**.408**	.653	9.9	2.5	1.5	**.5**	12.5
2003	Coca-Cola	**65**	38.0	.444	.274	.575	10.7	**4.3**	**1.8**	**.5**	13.7
2004–05	Coca-Cola	16	32.3	.460	.167	.623	8.9	3.9	1.4	.3	11.4
2006–07	Barangay Ginebra	35	33.0	.515	.273	.614	11.3	2.6	1.5	**.5**	**15.1**
2009–10	Barangay Ginebra	21	21.7	.455	.000	.473	7.7	.8	.8	.2	7.0
2010–11	Barangay Ginebra	45	29.1	.454	.235	.584	10.2	2.1	.8	.4	8.5
2011–12	Barangay Ginebra	28	24.9	.480	.000	.366	7.3	1.7	1.0	.2	6.6
2012–13	Barangay Ginebra	37	24.9	.435	.000	.551	5.7	1.3	.5	.2	4.0
Career		358	32.3	.466	.266	.593	9.7	2.5	1.2	.4	10.9

== Present ==
He and his then-girlfriend Rufa Mae Quinto starred in Masikip sa Dibdib: The Boobita Rose Story with Quinto as the title role Boobita Rose, with him have the role of Mark. In 2004, they separated. Hatfield lives in Detroit, Michigan with his wife and six children.
