= 2003 San Miguel Beermen season =

- Head coach: Jong Uichico
- General Manager: Robert Non
- Owner(s): San Miguel Corporation

All-Filipino Cup results
- Record: 13–8 (61.9%)
- Place: N/A
- Playoff finish: QF

Invitational Cup results
- Record: 2–2 (50%)
- Place: N/A
- Playoff finish: N/A

Reinforced Conference results
- Record: 13–12 (52%)
- Place: 2nd
- Playoff finish: Runner-up

San Miguel Beermen seasons

The 2003 San Miguel Beermen season was the 29th season of the franchise in the Philippine Basketball Association (PBA).

== Finals stint ==
After missing out the finals in the last five conferences, the Beermen made it to the championship playoffs in the Reinforced Third Conference. The Beermen dropped their first five games in the eliminations, playing without an import in their first game before returnee Shea Seals suited up. Seals was replaced by Eric Dailey, who played one game before the Beermen reactivate Seals only to be replaced again this time by former Sta. Lucia import Kwan Johnson, who led the team to their first victory in their six outing, an 85–73 win over Purefoods TJ Hotdogs on September 26.

San Miguel had five wins and eight losses at the end of the elimination round. The Beermen scored a two-game sweep off FedEx Express in the best-of-three quarterfinals and a three-game sweep over Sta.Lucia Realtors in the best-of-five semifinals to make it all the way to the championship series against the Coca-Cola Tigers. The Beermen led 2–1 in the series but lost to the Tigers in seven games.

== Occurrences ==
Center Dorian Peña was suspended for two games during the All-Filipino Cup when he was tested positive of traces of marijuana in a drug test conducted by the PBA.

On June 12, two-time MVP Benjie Paras came out of retirement to sign a two-month contract with San Miguel, only his second team in a 14-year PBA career that started in 1989. The former Shell franchise player announced his retirement earlier in the year.

When Kwan Johnson suffered a groin injury in Game one of the PBA Reinforced Conference finals, San Miguel played importless in the second game of the title series which they lost via rout. The Beermen decided to tap NBA veteran Cedric Ceballos as a temporary replacement in Game three and then opted to stick with Kwan Johnson for the rest of the finals series.

== Roster ==
2003 San Miguel Beermen roster
Players

Pos.	#	POB	Name	Height	Weight	DOB (YYYY–MM–DD)	From
G	1	(Philippines)	Boybits Victoria	5 ft 10 in (1.78 m)			San Beda
F	2	(Philippines)	Bryan Gahol	6 ft 4 in (1.93 m)			Philippines
F	3	(United States)	Nic Belasco	6 ft 4 in (1.93 m)			Notre Dame (OH)
C	4	(United States)	Dorian Peña	6 ft 6 in (1.98 m)			Coppin State
G	6	(Philippines)	Billy Moody	6 ft 1 in (1.85 m)			Letran
G	7	(Philippines)	Dondon Hontiveros	6 ft 2 in (1.88 m)			Cebu
F/C	10	(Philippines)	Danny Ildefonso	6 ft 6 in (1.98 m)			National-U
F	11	(Philippines)	Arnold Calo	6 ft 3 in (1.91 m)			MLQU
C	14	(Philippines)	Benjie Paras	6 ft 5 in (1.96 m)			Philippines
G	17	(Philippines)	Olsen Racela	5 ft 10 in (1.78 m)			Ateneo
G	21	(Philippines)	Joey Mente	5 ft 10 in (1.78 m)			Lyceum
F/C	22	(Philippines)	Arnold Gamboa	6 ft 6 in (1.98 m)			Far Eastern
F	29	(Philippines)	Marlon Legaspi	6 ft 5 in (1.96 m)			MLQU
F	41	(United States)	Eric Dailey (I)	6 ft 4 in (1.93 m)			Western Carolina
G	32	(United States)	Shea Seals (I)	6 ft 3 in (1.91 m)			Tulsa
G	23	(United States)	Kwan Johnson (I)	6 ft 3 in (1.91 m)			New Orleans
F	24	(United States)	Cedric Ceballos (I)	6 ft 4 in (1.93 m)			Cal State Fullerton

Coaches
Head coach
- (Philippines) Jong Uichico
Assistant(s)
- (Philippines) Siot Tanquingcen
- (Philippines) Arturo Dela Cruz

Legend
- (DP) Unsigned draft pick
- (FA) Free agent
- (S) Suspended
- (I) Import
- Injured

== Game results ==
=== All-Filipino Cup ===
Date	Opponent	Score	Top scorer	Venue	Location
February 28	Coca-Cola	67–72		Makati Coliseum	Makati City
March 5	Red Bull	93–90		Philsports Arena	Pasig
March 9	Talk 'N Text	79–83		Araneta Coliseum	Quezon City
March 14	Brgy.Ginebra	80–76		Philsports Arena	Pasig
March 19	Alaska	81–76		Philsports Arena	Pasig
March 22	Shell	89–81		Lamberto Macias Sports Center	Dumaguete City
March 28	Purefoods	85–88	Hontiveros (22 pts)	Araneta Coliseum	Quezon City
April 4	Red Bull	93–96		Philsports Arena	Pasig
April 11	Sta.Lucia	80–77 OT		Makati Coliseum	Makati City
April 16	FedEx	81–91	Belasco (21 pts)	Philsports Arena	Pasig
April 23	Purefoods	72–82		Philsports Arena	Pasig
April 26	Alaska	78–69		Ynares Center	Antipolo City
May 3	Sta.Lucia	81–70			Puerto Princesa, Palawan
May 7	Brgy.Ginebra	103–97		Phil sports Arena	Pasig
May 14	Coca-Cola	82–77		Philsports Arena	Pasig
May 16	Shell	76–58		Ynares Center	Antipolo City
May 23	FedEx	88–79		Makati Coliseum	Makati City
May 28	Talk 'N Text	106–102	Belasco (27 pts)	Philsports Arena	Pasig

Win
Win via OT
loss
loss via OT
