= Nic Belasco =

Filipino basketball player and coach

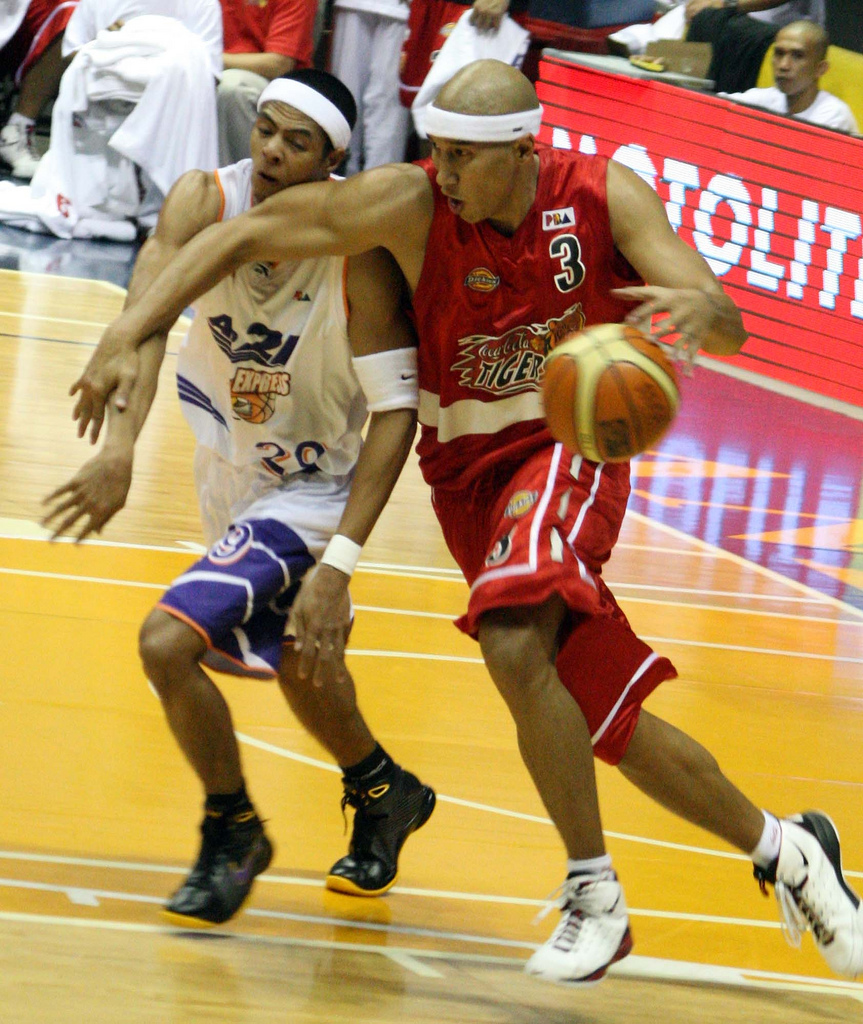

Personal information
- Born: December 10, 1973 (age 52) Stockton, California, U.S.
- Listed height: 6 ft 6 in (1.98 m)
- Listed weight: 210 lb (95 kg)

Career information
- College: Notre Dame de Namur
- PBA draft: 1997: 1st round, 2nd overall pick
- Drafted by: Sunkist Orange Juicers
- Playing career: 1997–2014, 2019–2020
- Position: Small forward / power forward
- Coaching career: 2015–2018

Career history

Playing
- 1997–1999: Sunkist Orange Juicers/Pop Cola Panthers
- 1999–2006: San Miguel Beermen
- 2006–2007: Alaska Aces
- 2007–2008: Welcoat Dragons
- 2008–2009: Coca-Cola Tigers
- 2009–2010: Talk 'N Text Tropang Texters
- 2010: Sta. Lucia Realtors
- 2012: Westports Malaysia Dragons
- 2012: Powerade Tigers
- 2012–2014: Alaska Aces
- 2019–2020: Pasig Sta. Lucia Realtors

Coaching
- 2015: Laguna BUSA Warriors
- 2016–2018: Phoenix Pulse Fuel Masters (assistant)

Career highlights
- 8× PBA champion (1999 Commissioner's, 1999 Governors', 2000 Commissioner's, 2000 Governors', 2001 All-Filipino, 2005 Fiesta, 2007 Fiesta, 2013 Commissioner's); 4x PBA All-Star (1997, 2003, 2005, 2008); PBA Mythical First Team (2005); 2× PBA Mythical Second Team (2001, 2002); PBA All-Defensive Team (2006)

Nicholas M. Bayaca Belasco (born December 10, 1973) is a Filipino-American professional basketball player who last played for the Pasig Sta. Lucia Realtors of the Maharlika Pilipinas Basketball League (MPBL). He was drafted 2nd overall by Sunkist in 1997. Born in Stockton, California, he was an import for the Westports Malaysia Dragons in the Asean Basketball League. He was an assistant coach for the Phoenix Pulse Fuel Masters of the Philippine Basketball Association (PBA). He founded the Belasco Unlimited Skills Academy (BUSA).

== Early life ==
Belasco grew up in Stockton, California, which is home to a large community of Filipinos. Before he came to the Philippines, he had the nickname of "Saint Nic." He is a third-generation Filipino-American with his ancestor coming over in 1926 doing farm labor in the Stockton area. Belasco was recruited by agent Bobby Rius during his stint in the San Francisco Pro-Am leagues.

== Professional career ==
=== Sunkist Orange Juicers/Pop Cola Panthers ===
Belasco was drafted 2nd overall by Sunkist in 1997. He was traded to the Beermen.

=== San Miguel Beermen ===
Belasco was traded along with Dwight Lago and Cris Bolado in exchange for Mythical Team selection Nelson Asaytono and Will Antonio. He has won 8 championships in his PBA career, six of them which he earned with San Miguel Beermen. In the 2004-05 Philippine Cup, he averaged around 17 points, 11.7 boards, 1.34 assists, 0.8 steals, 0.4 blocked shots and 1.8 errors in 37 minutes. This was highlighted by a 30-point performance against his former team.

=== Alaska Aces ===
Belasco was traded along with a second-round pick to Alaska for Brandon Cablay and rookie center Mark Kong after the 2005-06 Fiesta Conference. He won a championship with the Alaska Aces in the 2007 Fiesta Conference.

=== Welcoat Dragons ===
During the 2006–2007 season, Belasco was traded to the Welcoat Dragons for Junjun Cabatu.

=== Coca-Cola Tigers ===
On March 8, 2008, Belasco was shipped to the Coca-Cola Tigers in exchange for Mark Isip.

=== Talk 'N Text Tropang Texters ===
On August 3, 2009, in a three-way trade involving the Barako Bull Energy Boosters, Talk 'N Text Tropang Texters, and Coca-Cola Tigers, Belasco was shipped to the Talk 'N Text Tropang Texters, Rob Reyes to the Barako Bull Energy Boosters and Larry Rodriguez to the Coca-Cola Tigers.

=== Sta. Lucia Realtors ===
The Texters gave him, Ali Peek, and Pong Escobal to Sta. Lucia in a three-team, eight-player deal.

=== Westports Malaysia Dragons ===
He unretired to be an import for the Westsports Malaysia Dragons.

=== Powerade Tigers ===
In June 2012, after the Westports Malaysia Dragons were eliminated by the San Miguel Beermen in the semi-finals of the ABL, he was signed by the Powerade Tigers.

=== Return to Alaska Aces ===
One month later, he returned to the Aces along with Eddie Laure. In 2013, he won his 8th championship when the Aces won the 2013 Commissioner's Cup.

He was then placed in the 2014 expansion draft where the Kia Sorento picked him. He practiced with the team, but didn't play any games with them. Thus, he was forced into retirement.

=== Pasig Sta. Lucia Realtors (MPBL) ===
Five years after retiring, he returned to playing basketball, this time with the Pasig Sta. Lucia Realtors. He was 45 years old at this time. He played under the "Fil-Am" category.

== Coaching career ==
After Kia didn't play him, he became the head coach of the Laguna BUSA Warriors.

In 2016, he became an assistant coach under Ariel Vanguardia for the Phoenix Pulse Fuel Masters. He was tasked with developing their big men, such as Prince Caperal.

== Player profile ==
Belasco was a big man who played in the league during his career. He played inside the paint and also shot from the outside, and was used as a defensive specialist.

== Personal life ==
He is married to Maria Rafaella Verdadero, a former Miss Philippines-Australia and Ms. Binibing Pilipinas-World 2003, since 2004.

After retiring in 2014, Belasco put up the Belasco Unlimited Skills Academy (BUSA) with fellow ex-PBA star Ali Peek.

After his assistant coaching career, he focused more on his job as the general manager of a sports facility in Makati. He became an operations manager for ASM Global in September 2023.

== PBA career statistics ==
Legend
GP	Games played	MPG	Minutes per game
FG%	Field-goal percentage	3P%	3-point field-goal percentage	FT%	Free-throw percentage
RPG	Rebounds per game	APG	Assists per game	SPG	Steals per game
BPG	Blocks per game	PPG	Points per game	**Bold**	Career high

Correct as of February 19, 2022

Year	Team	GP	MPG	FG%	3P%	FT%	RPG	APG	SPG	BPG	PPG
1997	Pop Cola	38	31.7	.468	.000	.722	6.1	1.0	.5	**.7**	7.9
1998	Pop Cola	52	23.3	.347	**.500**	.606	4.5	.7	.3	.7	4.8
1999	Pop Cola/ San Miguel	45	32.9	.437	.000	.660	6.4	1.3	.4	.6	6.2
2000	San Miguel	52	32.5	**.530**	.000	.713	7.9	.8	.3	.6	7.0
2001	San Miguel	70	31.7	.515	.000	**.776**	7.0	.9	.3	.4	8.4
2002	San Miguel	47	26.5	.431	.361	.700	5.2	1.0	.4	.3	9.3
2003	San Miguel	50	**36.4**	.382	.272	.606	9.4	1.7	.8	.3	**13.2**
2004-05	San Miguel	**78**	35.5	.395	.318	.746	8.9	1.8	.5	.3	12.3
2005-06	San Miguel/ Alaska	48	35.3	.394	.349	.671	9	**2.2**	**.9**	.5	**13.2**
2006–07	Alaska	53	31.7	.373	.314	.610	7.6	1.6	.4	.3	10
2007–08	Welcoat/ Coca-Cola	39	33.3	.352	.314	.717	**10.4**	1.5	.7	.4	10.8
2008–09	Coca-Cola	32	32.1	.393	.265	.699	7.7	1.3	.3	.3	11.8
2009–10	Talk 'N Text/ Sta. Lucia	34	17.6	.344	.244	.639	3.8	.5	.2	.3	4.3
2011–12	Powerade	4	15	.444	.000	.333	5.0	.3	.5	.3	2.5
2012–13	Alaska	32	5.7	.263	.200	.700	1.3	.1	.0	.1	.9
2013-14	Alaska	15	8.6	.250	.100	.000	1.3	.0	.0	.0	1
Career		689	29.5	.407	.302	.687	6.9	1.2	.4	.4	8.7
