= Powerade Tigers =

- Founded: 2002
- Dissolved: Sold in 2012
- History: Coca-Cola Tigers (2002–2010); Powerade Tigers (2010–2012)
- Team colors: Coca-Cola Tigers Powerade Tigers
- Ownership: Coca-Cola Bottlers Philippines, Inc.
- Championships: 2 2002 All-Filipino; 2003 Reinforced 5 Finals appearances
- Retired numbers: 2 (19, 22)
Light uniform	Dark uniform

The Powerade Tigers were a professional basketball team that played in the Philippine Basketball Association from 2002 to 2012. The franchise was owned by Coca-Cola Bottlers Philippines, Inc. (CCBPI) when the company acquired Cosmos Bottling Corporation from RFM Corporation. From 2002 to 2010, the team played as the Coca-Cola Tigers. The franchise won two PBA championships, in 2002 and 2003.

== Beginnings ==
In 2001, RFM Corporation sold its subsidiary Cosmos Bottling Corporation, including its PBA franchise, to Coca-Cola Bottlers Philippines, Inc. (CCBPI), then a subsidiary of San Miguel Corporation (SMC),

The newly acquired franchise debuted as the Coca-Cola Tigers beginning the 2002 PBA season.

== Coca-Cola Tigers (2002–2010) ==
Coca-Cola Tigers
Colors
Uniforms
Light uniform	Dark uniform

=== 2002 season ===
In its maiden season, the Tigers failed to capture the first two conferences of the tournament (a third-place finish in the Governor's Cup and a disappointing quarterfinals finish in the Commissioner's Cup), the Tigers surged ahead in the All-Filipino Conference. Bannered by Rudy Hatfield and Jeffrey Cariaso after serving time with the national team, Coca-Cola defeated their then-sister team San Miguel in the semi-finals to enter their first finals appearance against the Alaska Aces.

After losing Johnny Abarrientos in Game One of the best-of-five series, the Tigers won the next three games to secure their first-ever PBA title. Ironically, the Tigers clinched the series on the first PBA game held on Christmas Day.

=== 2003 season ===
During their second season in the league, Coca-Cola failed to win the championship in the first two conferences. In the All-Filipino Conference, the Tigers blew a 2–0 lead in the best-of-seven series as their counterparts Talk 'N Text won the next four games to win the series. In the Invitational tournament, Alaska took revenge on the Tigers, winning the said tournament in three games.

But the Tigers succeeded in the Reinforced Conference. Bannered by former Mobiline import Artemus McClary, Coke won against San Miguel in seven grueling games to win their second PBA crown.

McClary was named Best Import of the tournament while Hatfield won the Best Player of the Conference award for the first time in his career.

=== 2004–05 season ===
Coca-Cola failed to return in the Finals in the 2004 Fiesta Conference as they were eliminated by Red Bull in the semi-finals with Mark Sanford as import.

In the 2004–2005 PBA Philippine Cup, the Tigers struggled after the indefinite suspension of Rudy Hatfield due to citizenship issues, the acquisition of Ali Peek and John Arigo from Alaska in exchange for Jeffrey Cariaso and Reynel Hugnatan midway through the tournament and the naming of Chot Reyes as the head coach of the Philippine National team, the Tigers were eliminated by another sister-team Purefoods in the wild-card phase, 2-1.

Eric Altamirano made his return in the PBA as Coca-Cola's coach in the 2005 Fiesta Conference but the Tigers finished dead last in the tournament, eliminated by Alaska in the wild-card phase.

=== 2005–06 season ===
During the offseason, the Tigers selected FEU playmaker Denok Miranda in the first round, Magnolia Ice Cream forward Neil Rañeses and Montaña Pawnshop's Al Magpayo in the second round in the PBA Rookie Draft while hiring Barangay Ginebra assistant Binky Favis as the team's third head coach in nine months. The Tigers entered the 2005–2006 PBA Fiesta Conference as one of the least contenders. Coca-Cola Tigers finished ninth place in the classification phase and was eliminated by San Miguel in the Survivor Round.

In the 2006 PBA Philippine Cup, the Tigers went 7–9 in the classification phase. However, after starting the season 4–0 and 6–2 in the first round, the Tigers lost seven of the last eight games, falling in a tie for fifth place with the Air21 Express. Both teams played a one-game match for the final outright quarterfinals berth in the playoffs on May 28 with the Tigers defeating the Express, 97–83. The win gave the Tigers its first quarterfinals berth since the 2004 Fiesta Conference. The Tigers lost to the Alaska Aces, 3–1 in the quarterfinals.

=== CCBPI sold to The Coca-Cola Company ===
In December 2006, San Miguel Corporation sold its entire stake in Coca-Cola Bottlers Philippines, Inc. (CCBPI) back to The Coca-Cola Company.

==== 2006–07 season ====
Months before the start of the season, the Tigers were involved in a three-team trade involving former sister team Barangay Ginebra Kings and Air21 Express in one of the most celebrated and controversial transactions in league history.

In the deal, the Tigers dealt Rafi Reavis, Billy Mamaril and the rights to Rudy Hatfield to Ginebra. The Kings sent Aries Dimaunahan and Ervin Sotto, along with future draft picks to Air21 while Coca-Cola received Kalani Ferreria from Brgy. Ginebra, Ryan Bernardo from Air21 and Manny Ramos (initially from Ginebra but was received from Air21 under the revised version of the deal).

During the draft held in Market-Market, Taguig, the Coca-Cola Tigers selected ex-La Salle shooting guard Joseph Yeo as the third overall pick in the first round. The Tigers then chose FEU hotshot R.J. Rizada (12th pick), PSBA standout Manuel Caceres (14th pick), St. Francis of Assisi shooting guard Chris Pacana (15th pick), Air21 Express traded their 2006 second round pick for the Tigers 2007 second round pick that was sealed on the draft day, slotman/center Mike Gavino (16th pick), and ex-Letran guard Ronjay Enrile (17th pick) in the second round.

At the start of the season, Coca-Cola struggled throughout the conference due to its depleted lineup but had its share of surprising wins over Red Bull and Sta. Lucia among others. The Tigers barely made it to the wildcard phase with a 5–13 record.

In the wildcard phase, Coke pulled off a 99–98 come-from-behind win over Alaska on a Denok Miranda buzzer-beating triple. But the Tigers lost their next two games to bow out of contention for the quarterfinals phase.

But prior to the start of the 2007 PBA Fiesta Conference, it was announced that the Atlanta-based company will have full control of the franchise, with coaches, players and management staying upon further notice, saying that The Coca-Cola Company would honor their existing contracts.

On March 23, 2007, team manager Allan Caidic announced his resignation from his post to allow the Coca-Cola Company to have a free hand in running the team affairs. It was speculated that the move was because of Caidic's loyalty to the former team owner Eduardo "Danding" Cojuangco.

The Tigers won their first two games with Anthony Johnson, but soon suffered a series of defeats. Because of these, the Tigers made a change on its lineup. Coca-Cola replaced Johnson with Jeff Varem and acquired 1998 PBA MVP Kenneth Duremdes, Alex Cabagnot and Ricky Calimag from Sta. Lucia in exchange of Denok Miranda, Manny Ramos and future picks. The Tigers finish 7th in the classification phase and was relegated to wildcard phase.

With scoring import Rashad Bell at the helm, Coke beat Purefoods in the first knockout wildcard match, but suffered a monumental 102–101 loss to San Miguel in the last match for the quarterfinals, despite leading, 101–97, with 13 seconds to play.

==== 2007–08 season ====
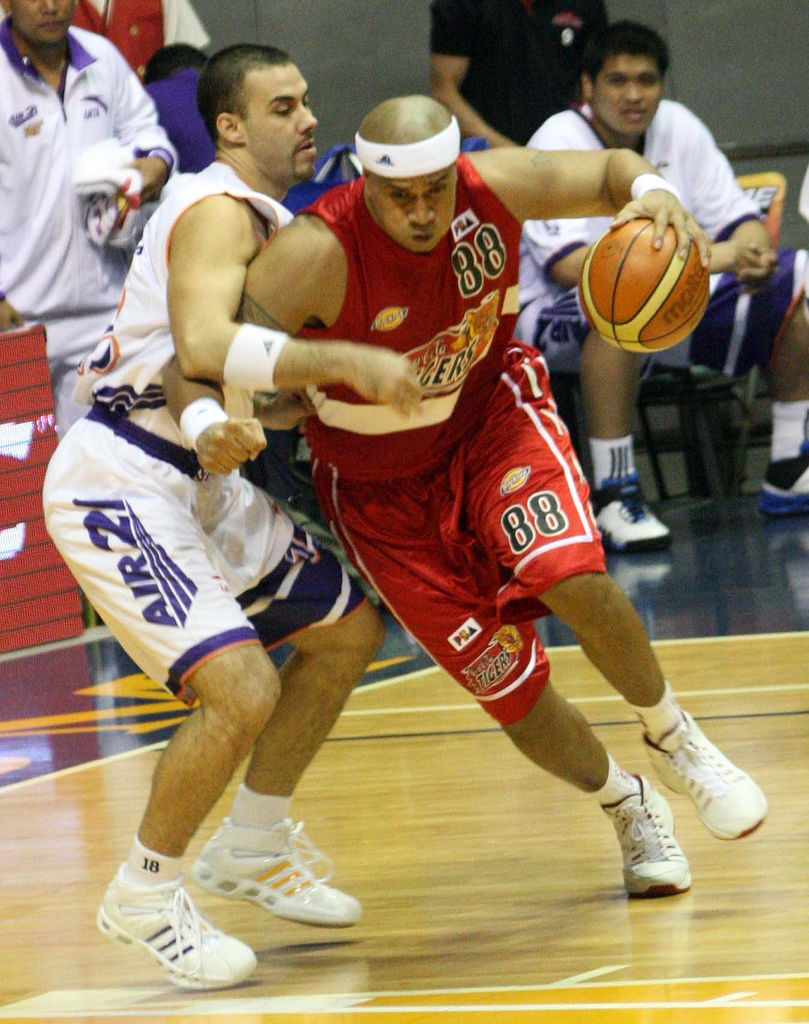
Asi Taulava joined the Coca-Cola Tigers in November 2007. He stayed until September 2010, when he was traded to the Meralco Bolts

After a dismal season, Coca-Cola head coach Binky Favis made some interesting moves that made the Tigers a competitive team during the 33rd season. Looking for a man in the middle and guards to boost its lineup, the Tigers pawned center/forward Mark Telan from Air21 in exchange for its two 1st round picks in the 2007 draft and signed Egay Echavez in the free agent pool. On draft night, the Tigers picked former Emilio Aguinaldo standout Ronjay Buenafe as the 11th overall in the 2nd round.

Upon getting Buenafe, the Tigers sent Joseph Yeo and a 2008 second round pick to the Sta. Lucia Realtors in exchange for forward Mark Isip and shooter Cesar Catli.

On the start of the 33rd season, the Tigers won their first game against expansion team the Welcoat Dragons but then suffered a franchise-worst eight straight losses.

Because of injuries and a string set of setbacks, Coca-Cola took Aries Dimaunahan from Air21. On November 26, the Talk 'N Text Phone Pals traded franchise player Asi Taulava to the Coca-Cola Tigers in exchange for Ali Peek and a 2008 first round pick. Asi "The Rock" then became Coke's main skipper. He then led his team to a five-game winning streak that was enough to get the Tigers through the wildcard phase with a 7–11 card during the season.

In the wildcard phase, the Tigers eliminated the Talk 'N Text Phone Pals and Air21 Express to get into the quarterfinals, the lowest-seed to do so. In the quarterfinals, the Tigers ran out of gas as the Alaska Aces swept them in the best-of-3 series, partly due to overfatigue on the part of the Tigers.

Having the second-worst elimination round record, the Tigers, along with the Welcoat Dragons were allowed to acquire an import 6 ft 1 in (1.85 m) in height, aside from the import of unrestricted height that the other teams had.

==== 2009–10 season ====
In preparation for the 35th season of the PBA, Coca-Cola unloaded several players from their line-up and underwent team-rebuilding process. They traded Ronjay Buenafe to the Burger King for Marvin Cruz and Chris Ross. They traded also traded Aries Dimaunahan and M.C. Caceres to Barako Bull for Ken Bono. Another move they made was they settled a trade with the Sta. Lucia Realtors acquiring Dennis Espino in exchange of Jason Misolas and a future draft pick. They then signed free agents Norman Gonzales and Larry Rodriguez.

At the start of the season, Coca-Cola assigned then-assistant coach Kenneth Duremdes to his first head coaching duties with the Tigers. After a few games, Duremdes was then assigned as the Team Manager and Assistant Coach Bo Perasol took over as head coach. After a dismal start in the Philippine Cup campaign, the Tigers made a move by getting Burger King stalwart Gary David alongside Chico Lanete, while giving up all-around Guard Alex Cabagnot and Wesley Gonzales in a deal. After the trade, they then went on to win 4 straight games, but still ended up in the 7th seed of the team standings. The Tigers defeated Burger King in their first Wildcard match before bowing out to the Rain or Shine Elasto Painters in the next game.

At the start of the Fiesta Cup, the team was running well as they won three straight games and four of their first five including a win over powerhouse team the San Miguel Beermen. But after a great start, the Tigers then lost their last seven games. They ended their losing streak by winning against the Barako Bull Energy Boosters. They finished the eliminations with an 8-10 record and advanced to the Wildcard round. They won their knockout match against Sta. Lucia but got eliminated again by Rain or Shine at the conclusion of the wildcards.

== Powerade Tigers (2010–2012) ==
After finishing the season fruitless, Coca-Cola Bottlers Philippines, Inc. (CCBPI) announced that they will rechristen the Tigers as the Powerade Tigers starting in the 2010–2011 season.

=== 2010–11 season ===
With the change of team name, big man Asi Taulava stated that he would remain and would like to retire with the franchise, and hoped to win a title with the team, even though reports circulated that expansion team Meralco Bolts was interested with the former MVP. Having no first round pick in the draft, the Tigers used their 18th pick to acquire a point guard that would strengthen their backcourt. On Draft Day, Powerade selected Jai Reyes of the Ateneo de Manila University as their 18th pick in the 2010 Draft. On the same day, Powerade acquired Air21's 6th pick, Sean Michael Anthony, and Ren-Ren Ritualo in exchange for future draft picks. During the off-season, Powerade did not renew the contracts of four players from the previous year namely Cesar Catli, Ricky Calimag, R.J. Rizada, and Marvin Cruz. On September 22, 2010, Asi Taulava was included in the three-team trade involving the Meralco Bolts and the Barako Bull Energy Boosters. Powerade received Barako's Robert Reyes and Meralco's 2011 and 2012 second-round picks. Barako received Powerade's Ken Bono and Meralco's Beau Belga, Jason Misolas, and Khasim Mirza. Meralco then got Powerade's Asi Taulava.

=== 2011–12 season: Final season ===
After a disappointing season, Powerade began offseason buildup by releasing Rob Reyes and Chico Lanete, then resigning Ricky Calimag and signing free agents Alex Crisano, James Martinez and Rudy Lingganay. In the 2011 PBA Draft, Powerade selected Gilas standouts JVee Casio and Marcio Lassiter, and acquired Josh Vanlandingham and Doug Kramer through trades. JVee Casio however was injured as the season began and debuted a few weeks later.

The team finished with 6 wins and 8 losses and ranked 8th. With Gary David averaging almost 30 points per game during the playoffs, they had managed to beat the B-Meg Llamados, the 1st seeded team in two games. They beat the Yeng Guiao-led Rain or Shine Elasto Painters in the semifinals in seven games. They enter the finals with a heavy underdog tag against the Chot Reyes-mentored Talk 'N Text Tropang Texters. Without JVee Casio in game 1, they lost against the Texters by a score of 116–100. In game 2, they lost, 106–92. In game 3, they lost in a score of 133–126. In game 4, they won by a score of 100–97. In game 5, they lost against the Texters by a score of 110–101, thus finishing the 2nd place in the Philippine Cup and Talk 'n Text becoming the champion.

Before the start of Commissioner's Cup, the Petron Blaze Boosters was interested with the Powerade's 2011 4th overall pick Marcio Lassiter who was one of the instrumental in Powerade's Cinderella run to the finals of the Philippine Cup. Their first offer were Nonoy Baclao, and Rey Guevarra in exchange for Marcio Lassiter. But on February 20, 2012, PBA vetoed the controversial trade.

At the start of the Commissioner's Cup, the team acquired Dwayne Jones as an import and lead them to a 4 wins and 5 losses. They tied with and got eliminated by Meralco Bolts, by a score of 102–98 on the knock-out game for 6th place. The team finished 7th place.

After the disappointing conference for both Powerade (4–5) and Petron (3–6), Powerade rookie star Marcio Lassiter is again on the trade bloc with Petron. Finally on April 20, 2012, the Philippine Basketball Association approved the trade in which Powerade sent Marcio Lassiter and Celino Cruz to Petron for Rey Guevarra, Rabeh Al-Hussaini, and Lordy Tugade.

On May 1, 2012, another controversial trade was vetoed by the PBA which will send Doug Kramer to Barako Bull Energy in exchange for Jondan Salvador. On May 5, 2012, the revised trade which will send Doug Kramer to Barako Bull Energy in exchange for Jondan Salvador plus its 2012 1st round pick from Talk 'N Text Tropang Texters was accepted by the PBA.

On the Governor's Cup, the team acquired Rashad McCants and become a favored import over to his counterpart imports but gave the team a disappointing 2-losing streak at the start of the Governor's cup. He is replaced by Omar Sneed and gave the team a 4-winning streak but later suffered a 3-losing streak, despite a need of 1 more win to book a semi-finals ticket. Because of this, they advanced to the 6th-seed playoffs. They won their knockout match against Barako Bull Energy but got eliminated again by Meralco Bolts.

=== Disbandment and sale to GlobalPort ===
During the semifinal round of the 2011–12 Philippine Cup, rumors surfaced that the team would be sold back to San Miguel Corporation (SMC). This was allegedly due to an agreement between SMC and The Coca-Cola Company (the parent company of Coca-Cola Bottlers Philippines, Inc. (CCBPI)) that SMC will have the right of first refusal in the event the team would be put up for sale. The buyback by SMC did not materialize.

On February 17, 2012, JB Baylon resigns as a Powerade governor. Speculations as to the reasons of his resignation was that he was the alleged source of the rumors of the franchise's sale and the controversial trade proposal of Marcio Lassiter. CCBPI wrote the PBA to advise the appointment of Ronald Asuncion as alternate governor.

On May 1, 2012, rumors surfaced that CCBPI will leave the PBA because of the two recent controversial trading of its marquee players to other teams.

On July 30, 2012, CCBPI announced the sale of the Powerade Tigers to Sultan 900, Inc. which is owned and represented by its chairman and CEO Michael "Mikee" Romero. The PBA Board of Governors unanimously approved the sale during a special board meeting on August 17, 2012. The team was renamed as the GlobalPort Batang Pier.

== Final roster ==
Powerade Tigers roster
Players
Coaches

Pos.	#	POB	Name	Height	Weight	DOB (YYYY–MM–DD)	From
C	2	(Philippines)	Rabeh Al-Hussaini	6 ft 7 in (2.01 m)	240 lb (109 kg)		Ateneo
G	3	(Philippines)	James Martinez (R)	5 ft 10 in (1.78 m)	170 lb (77 kg)		UE
G	4	(Philippines)	Rudy Lingganay (R)	5 ft 10 in (1.78 m)	170 lb (77 kg)		UE
F	5	(Philippines)	Jondan Salvador	6 ft 3 in (1.91 m)	210 lb (95 kg)		St. Benilde
F	7	(Philippines)	Rey Guevarra	6 ft 3 in (1.91 m)	175 lb (79 kg)		Letran
F	8	(Philippines)	Francis Allera	6 ft 3 in (1.91 m)	180 lb (82 kg)		UST
F	10	(Canada)	Sean Anthony	6 ft 4 in (1.93 m)	200 lb (91 kg)		McGill
G/F	15	(Philippines)	Lordy Tugade	6 ft 3 in (1.91 m)	184 lb (83 kg)		National-U
C	17	(Philippines)	Rommel Adducul	6 ft 6 in (1.98 m)	225 lb (102 kg)		San Sebastian
G	20	(Philippines)	Gary David (C)	6 ft 1 in (1.85 m)	180 lb (82 kg)		Lyceum
G/F	22	(United States)	Josh Vanlandingham	6 ft 4 in (1.93 m)	205 lb (93 kg)		Pacific Lutheran
F	24	(Philippines)	Ricky Calimag	6 ft 4 in (1.93 m)	210 lb (95 kg)		San Beda
F	33	(United States)	Nic Belasco	6 ft 6 in (1.98 m)	210 lb (95 kg)		Notre Dame (MD)
F	34	(United States)	William Antonio (C)	6 ft 3 in (1.91 m)	190 lb (86 kg)		Chaminade
G	42	(Philippines)	JVee Casio (R)	5 ft 10 in (1.78 m)	175 lb (79 kg)		De La Salle
C	43	(United States)	Alex Crisano (injured) (IN)	6 ft 7 in (2.01 m)	240 lb (109 kg)		Brooklyn

Head coach

- (Philippines) Bo Perasol (UP Diliman)

Assistant coach(es)

- (Philippines) George Ella (UE)
- (United States) Alex Compton (Cornell)
- (Philippines) Ricky Dandan (UP Diliman)
- (Philippines) Charles Tiu (Ateneo)

Legend

- (C) Team captain
- (CI) Commissioner's Cup Import
- (GI) Governors' Cup Import
- (EI) EASL Import
- (DP) Unsigned draft pick
- (FA) Free agent
- (IN) Inactive
- (S) Suspended
- (R) Rookie
- Injured

=== Final depth chart ===
Pos.	Starting 5	Bench 1	Bench 2	Bench 3
C	Omar Sneed	Rabeh Al-Hussaini	Alex Crisano	Rommel Adducul
PF	Jondan Salvador	William Antonio	Ricky Calimag
SF	Sean Anthony	Josh Vanlandingham	Francis Allera
SG	Gary David	Rey Guevarra	Lordy Tugade
PG	JVee Casio	Rudy Lingganay	James Martinez

== Head coaches ==
Powerade Tigers head coaches
Name	Start	End	Seasons	Overall record				Best finish
Name	Start	End	Seasons	W	L	PCT	G	Best finish
Chot Reyes	2002	2004	3	91	47	.659	138	Champions
Biboy Ravanes	2004	2005	1	15	25	.375	40	Wildcard
Eric Altamirano	2005	2005	1	7	11	.389	18	Wildcard
Binky Favis	2005	2008	4	42	62	.404	104	Quarterfinals
Kenneth Duremdes	2008	2009	1	14	21	.400	35	Wildcard
Bo Perasol	2009	2012	3	34	47	.420	81	Finals

== Season-by-season records ==
Records from the 2011–12 PBA season:

Conf.	Team name	Elimination round				Playoffs	
Conf.	Team name	Finish	W	L	PCT	Stage	Results
PHI	Powerade Tigers	8th/10	6	8	.429	Quarterfinals Semifinals; Finals	Powerade def. B-Meg** 97–88, 131–122 (OT); Powerade 4, Rain or Shine 3 Talk 'N Text 4, Powerade 1
COM	Powerade Tigers	7th/10	4	5	.444	6th-seed playoff	Meralco 102, Powerade 98*
GOV	Powerade Tigers	8th/10	4	5	.444	1st elim. playoff 2nd elim. playoff	Powerade 99, Barako Bull 95*; Meralco 94, Powerade 86*
Total elimination round			14	18	.438	1 semifinal appearances	
Total playoffs			7	7	.500	1 Finals appearances	
Total 2011–12			21	25	.457	0 championships	
Total franchise			216	239	.475	2 championships	

*one-game playoffs
**team had the twice-to-beat advantage

=== Retired numbers ===
Powerade Tigers retired number
N°	Player	Position	Tenure
19	Kenneth Duremdes	SF	2007-2008^{[a]}
22	Jeffrey Cariaso	SG	2002-2005

- ^{a} – Poweade retired the jersey number of Duremdes on March 23, 2012, before a Powerade–Alaska game.

== Awards ==
=== Individual awards ===
Finals MVP	PBA Best Player of the Conference	PBA All-Defensive Team
Rudy Hatfield (2002 All-Filipino); Jeffrey Cariaso (2003 Reinforced)	Jeffrey Cariaso (2002 All-Filipino); Rudy Hatfield (2003 Reinforced); Gary David (2011-12 Philippine)	Rudy Hatfield (2002, 2003); Johnny Abarrientos (2004-05); Asi Taulava (2008-09)
PBA Mythical First Team	PBA Mythical Second Team	PBA Most Improved Player
Jeffrey Cariaso (2002, 2003); Rudy Hatfield (2003); Asi Taulava (2007-08, 2008-09); Gary David (2011-12)	Johnny Abarrientos (2003); Asi Taulava (2009-10)	Rafi Reavis (2003)
PBA Best Import
Tee McClary (2003 Reinforced)

=== PBA Press Corps individual awards ===
Baby Dalupan Coach of the Year	Defensive Player of the Year
Chot Reyes (2002, 2003)	Rudy Hatfield (2003)
Mr. Quality Minutes	All-Rookie Team
Ato Morano (2002)	Denok Miranda (2005-06); Ronjay Buenafe (2007-08); Sean Anthony (2010-11); JVee Casio (2011-12)

=== All-Star weekend ===
Three-point shootout	All-Star selection
William Antonio (2006); Mark Macapagal (2010, 2011)	2003: Jeffrey Cariaso; Rudy Hatfield; 2004: Jeffrey Cariaso; Rudy Hatfield; 2005: Billy Mamaril; 2006: John Arigo; Ali Peek; 2007: John Arigo; 2008: Nic Belasco; Asi Taulava; 2009: Asi Taulava; 2010: Asi Taulava; 2012: JVee Casio; Gary David

== Players of note ==
=== PBA's 40th anniversary all-time team ===
- Johnny Abarrientos – 1996 PBA MVP. Member of the Tigers 2002 and 2003 championship teams and the PBA all time steals leader.
- Kenneth Duremdes – The 1998 Most Valuable Player. Acquired in 2007 Fiesta Conference from Sta. Lucia with Alex Cabagnot and Ricky Calimag in exchange of Dennis Miranda, Manny Ramos and Coke's 2008 second round pick.
- Asi Taulava – The 2003 Most Valuable Player. Acquired in the 2007-08 Philippine Cup from Talk 'N Text in exchange for Ali Peek and a 2008 first-round draft pick.

=== Other notable players ===
- Freddie Abuda – multiple Defensive Player of the Year awardee.
- William Antonio – member of the Tigers championship teams and the longest tenured player in franchise history. Played from 2002 to 2007 and from 2009 to 2012.
- John Arigo – multiple time All-Star, member of the Tigers from 2005 to 2008.
- Jeffrey Cariaso – Member of the Tigers 2002 and 2003 championship teams, named Finals MVP of the 2003 Reinforced Conference.
- JVee Casio – member of the 2011-12 Tigers as a rookie that went to the Finals in the Philippine Cup.
- Gary David – Best Player of the 2011-12 PBA Philippine Cup and led the team to a Finals appearance as an 8th seed, Member of PBA's 5,000 point club, and 3-Time PBA Scoring Champion from 2009–10 season to 2011–12.
- Rudy Hatfield – Member of the Tigers 2002 and 2003 championship teams, named Best Player of the 2003 Reinforced Conference.
- Edward Juinio – Tigers' center during their 2002 and 2003 championship runs.
- Doug Kramer – played for the Tigers in the 2011-12 season. Became a member of that year's All-Defensive Team.
- Marcio Lassiter – played as a rookie for the Tigers in 2011-12. The all-time leader in three-point field goals made.
- Billy Mamaril – played for Coke in the 2005–06 PBA season.
- Ali Peek – Member of PBA's 5,000 point club, Tigers' center from 2004–05 season to 2007–08.
- Rafi Reavis – one of the team's first-ever draft choice in 2002, member of the 2002 and 2003 championship teams.

=== Imports ===
- Bryant Basemore – played in 2002 Commissioner's Cup
- Rashad Bell #3 – played in 2007 Fiesta Conference
- Torraye Braggs #21 – played in 2002 Commissioner's Cup
- Calvin Cage #10 – played in 2008 Fiesta Conference, played only one game at the Tigers before getting injured
- Alex Carcamo #30 – played in the 2005–06 Fiesta Conference
- Russell Carter #2 – played in 2011 Commissioner's Cup
- Donald Copeland #4 – played in 2008 Fiesta Conference
- Carlos Daniel #21 – played in 2002
- Brandon Dean #1 – played for 2008 Fiesta Conference
- Jason Dixon #42 – played in 2008 Fiesta Conference
- Rosell Ellis #26 – played in the 2002 Governors Cup
- George "Gee" Gervin, Jr. #1 – played in 2008 Fiesta Conference, son of former NBA great George Gervin Sr.
- Ron Hale #22 – played in 2002
- Bakari Hendrix #23 – played only one game at the Tigers in 2005 Fiesta Conference before getting injured
- Darell Johns #35 – played in 2005 Fiesta Conference
- Anthony Johnson #23 – played for the 1st nine games of 2007 Fiesta Conference
- Dwayne Jones #21 – played in the 2012 Commissioner's Cup
- Rashad McCants #32 – played only first two games in the 2012 Governors Cup
- Artemus McClary #20 – named Best Import of the 2003 Reinforced Conference, led Tigers to the title of the said conference
- James Penny #23 – played in 2009 PBA Fiesta Conference
- Chris Porter #4 – played in 2012 Governor's Cup
- Jaja Richards # – played in 2004 Fiesta Conference
- Mark Sanford #3 – played in 2004 Fiesta Conference
- Omar Sneed #11 – last import; played in the 2012 Governors Cup
- James Sullinger #0 – played in 2009 PBA Fiesta Conference
- Omar Thomas #33 – played in 2005-06 Fiesta Conference
- Jeff Varem #91 – played in 2007 Fiesta Conference
- Fred Williams #22 – played in 2002 Governors'& Commissioner's Cup
- John Williamson #45 – played in 2010 Fiesta Conference
- Martin Zeno #3 – played in 2011 Commissioner's Cup

Preceded by Pop Cola Panthers	PBA teams genealogies 2002–2012	Succeeded by GlobalPort Batang Pier
Preceded by San Miguel Beermen	PBA All-Filipino Cup Champions; 2002	Succeeded by Talk 'N Text Phone Pals
Preceded by San Miguel Beermen (1989)	PBA Reinforced Conference Champions; 2003	Succeeded by (last)
