= 2013 Philippines men's national basketball team results =

The Philippines national basketball team in 2013 was led by head coach Chot Reyes. The national team finished second at the 2013 FIBA Asia Championship gaining one of the three Asian berths for the 2014 FIBA Basketball World Cup. The Philippines secured its place at the FIBA World Cup after 36 years of absence.

== Tournaments ==
=== Dubai Invitational Basketball Tournament ===
==== Group stage ====
January 11

Report

Al Mouttahed Tripoli (Lebanon)	77–79	Philippines
		Pts: Douthit 20

Al Ahli Club, Dubai

January 12

Report

Al Ahli (United Arab Emirates)	97–82	Philippines
Pts: Goldwire 24		Pts: Lanete 12

Al Ahli Club, Dubai

January 13

Report

Aramex (Jordan)	75–65	Philippines
		Pts: Alas 12

Al Ahli Club, Dubai

==== Quarterfinal ====
January 16

Report

Sagesse (Lebanon)	95–65	Philippines
		Pts: Canaleta 32

Al Ahli Club, Dubai

=== Super Kung Sheung Cup ===
==== Group stage ====
January 22
14:00

Report

Indonesia	78–110	Philippines
		Pts: Lanete 23

Queen Elizabeth Stadium, Wanchai, Hong Kong

January 23
19:00

Report

Hong Kong	58–85	Philippines
		Pts: Canaleta 15

Queen Elizabeth Stadium, Wanchai, Hong Kong

January 24
14:30

Report

Malaysia	46–119	Philippines
		Pts: Slaughter 27

Queen Elizabeth Stadium, Wanchai, Hong Kong

==== Semifinal ====
January 26
19:00

Report

Changsha Park Lane (China)	69–90	Philippines
Pts: Liu Fuxiang 17		Pts: Canaleta 18

Queen Elizabeth Stadium, Wanchai, Hong Kong

==== Final ====
January 27
15:30

Report

Philippines	81–77	(United States) S. California Fukienese Association
Pts: Douthit 19

Queen Elizabeth Stadium, Wanchai, Hong Kong

=== FIBA Asia Championship ===
==== Group stage ====
August 1
20:30

Report

Saudi Arabia	66–78	Philippines
Scoring by quarter: 16–14, 12–21, 18–22, 20–21
Pts: M. Al-Muwallad 18; Rebs: Mo. Al-Marwani 12; Asts: four players 2		Pts: Tenorio, Fonacier 12; Rebs: Douthit 11; Asts: Tenorio 6

Mall of Asia Arena, Pasay
Referees: Amirhossein Safarzadeh (IRN), Cheung Kwok Shun Andy (HKG), Thongchai Thaweewutsophon (THA)

August 2
20:30

Report

Jordan	71–77	Philippines
Scoring by quarter: 20–16, 18–17, 9–24, 24–20
Pts: Hadrab 19; Rebs: Hussein 9 Asts: Abdeen 4		Pts: Chan 17; Rebs: Douthit 9 Asts: Tenorio, Norwood 4

Mall of Asia Arena, Pasay
Referees: Mohammad Alamiri (KUW), Yuji Hirahara (JPN), Wang Mei (CHN)

August 3
20:30

Report

Philippines	79–84	Chinese Taipei
Scoring by quarter: 19–30, 24–12, 25–13, 11–29
Pts: Fonacier 21; Rebs: Douthit 10; Asts: William, Alapag 4		Pts: Lu C.J. 22; Rebs: Davis 10; Asts: Lin C.C. 12

Mall of Asia Arena, Pasay
Referees: Harja Jaladri (INA), Arsen Andryushkin (KAZ), Chong Yun Aun (MAS)

=== Second round ===
5 August 2013
20:30

Report

Philippines	90–71	Japan
Scoring by quarter: 17–14, 29–22, 29–15, 15–20
Pts: Douthit 19; Rebs: Douthit 10; Asts: Alapag 6		Pts: Sakuragi 19; Rebs: Sakuragi 13; Asts: three players 3

Mall of Asia Arena, Pasay
Referees: Arsen Andryushkin (KAZ), Yevgeniy Mikheyev (KAZ), Peng Ling (CHN)

6 August 2013
20:30

Report

Philippines	80–70	Qatar
Scoring by quarter: 20–20, 27–9, 16–15, 17–26
Pts: Douthit 19; Rebs: Douthit 14; Asts: Douthit 4		Pts: Hayes 17; Rebs: Hayes 11; Asts: El Hadary 5

Mall of Asia Arena, Pasay
Referees: Harja Jaladri (INA), Yevgeniy Mikheyev (KAZ), Wang Mei (CHN)

7 August 2013
20:30

Report

Hong Kong	55–67	Philippines
Scoring by quarter: 19–13, 14–15, 10–18, 12–21
Pts: S. W. Chan 16; Rebs: Reid 19; Asts: K. Lee, K. W. Li 3		Pts: Douthit 13; Rebs: Norwood 10; Asts: Castro 5

Mall of Asia Arena, Pasay
Referees: Amirhossein Safarzadeh (IRI), Abdulkarim Shakeeb (BHR), Shin Gi Rok (KOR)

==== Quarterfinals ====
August 9
20:30

Report

Philippines	88–58	Kazakhstan
Scoring by quarter: 32–15, 19–25, 16–9, 21–9
Pts: David 22; Rebs: Douthit 10; Asts: Tenorio, William, Fonacier 4		Pts: Klimov 14; Rebs: Ponomarev 12; Asts: Johnson, Yargaliyev, Klimov 3

Mall of Asia Arena, Pasay
Referees: Mohammad Alamiri (KUW), Snehal Bendke (IND), Tan Chin Siong (MAS)

==== Semifinals ====
August 10
20:30

Report

Philippines	86–79	South Korea
Scoring by quarter: 15–19, 21–20, 29–17, 21–23
Pts: William 17; Rebs: Pingris 10; Asts: de Ocampo, William 4		Pts: Kim M.G. 27; Rebs: Kim J.S., Kim T.S. 5 Asts: Yang D.G. 7

Mall of Asia Arena, Pasay
Referees: Mohammad Al Amiri (KUW), Yevgeniy Mikheyev (KAZ), Wang Mei (CHN)

==== Final ====
August 11
19:30

Report

Philippines	71–85	Iran
Scoring by quarter: 15–17, 19–18, 19–27, 18–23
Pts: William 18; Rebs: Pingris 8 Asts: Alapag 3		Pts: Haddadi 29; Rebs: Haddadi 16; Asts: Nikkhah 7

Mall of Asia Arena, Pasay
Attendance: 19,989
Referees: Arsen Andryushkin (KAZ), Yuji Hirahara (JPN), Harja Jaladri (INA)

=== Southeast Asian Games ===
December 9
14:00

Report PDF

Singapore	75–88	Philippines
Scoring by quarter: 22–13, 11–20, 25–31, 17–24
Scoring by half: 33–33, 42–55
Pts: W.L. Wong 23; Rebs: Liew 8 Asts: W.L. Wong 6		Pts: Belo 16; Rebs: three players 10; Asts: Parks 5

Zayar Thiri Indoor Stadium, Naypyidaw
Referees: Yuji Higashi (JPN), Preeda Muongmee (THA), Htoo Wai Lwin (MYA)

December 10
12:00

Report PDF

Philippines	107–57	Cambodia
Scoring by quarter: 25–16, 19–9, 32–14, 31–18
Scoring by half: 44–25, 63–32
Pts: Belo 17; Rebs: Parks 11; Asts: two players 5		Pts: Dominic Dar 27; Rebs: Boroth 17; Asts: three players 2

Zayar Thiri Indoor Stadium, Naypyidaw
Referees: Ceciline Michael Vino (IND), Sim Siong Chuan (SIN), Thongchai Thaweewutsophon (THA)

December 12
16:00

Report PDF

Myanmar	43–118	Philippines
Scoring by quarter: 14–34, 13–28, 10–26, 6–30
Scoring by half: 27–62, 16–56
Pts: Than Aung 11; Rebs: Than Aung 7 Asts: Tun Tun 6		Pts: Pascual 20; Rebs: three players 5 Asts: Sumang 6

Zayar Thiri Indoor Stadium, Naypyidaw
Referees: Jung Yu (TPE), Mr. Herman (INA), Preeda Muongmee (THA)

December 13
14:00

Report PDF

Philippines	100–68	Thailand
Scoring by quarter: 29–17, 25–16, 31–9, 15–26
Scoring by half: 54–33, 46–35
Pts: Ferrer 23; Rebs: Jake Pascual 10; Asts: Sumang 6		Pts: Ghogar 11; Rebs: three players 5 Asts: two players 2

Zayar Thiri Indoor Stadium, Naypyidaw
Referees: Yuji Higashi (JPN), Linn Maung (MYA), Haryanto Sutaryo (INA)

December 14
10:00

Report PDF

Indonesia	52–83	Philippines
Scoring by quarter: 18–18, 16–22, 9–27, 9–16
Scoring by half: 34–40, 18–43
Pts: Prawiro 14; Rebs: Gunawan 5 Asts: Prawiro 4		Pts: Douthit 11; Rebs: Douthit 11; Asts: Sumang 3

Zayar Thiri Indoor Stadium, Naypyidaw
Referees: Ceciline Michael Vino (IND), Naing Phyo Win (MYA), Pick Kieng Ting (MAS)

December 15
16:00

Report PDF

Malaysia	56–84	Philippines
Scoring by quarter: 15-21, 19-22, 15-25, 7-16
Scoring by half: 34-43, 22-41
Pts: Khee Ong 11; Rebs: Kuek 7 Asts: Ban Sin 5		Pts: Parks 18; Rebs: Douthit 7 Asts: Ravena 6

Zayar Thiri Indoor Stadium, Naypyidaw
Referees: Kin Pong Chan (MAC), Haryanto Sutaryo (INA), Linn Maung (MYA)

== Exhibition games ==
May 6

Report

Philippines	80–72	(China) Shanghai Sharks

Mall of Asia Arena, Pasay

July 12

Report

Hawkes Bay Hawks (New Zealand)	78–82	Philippines

Hastings Sports Centre, Napier

July 13

Report

Hawkes Bay Hawks (New Zealand)	70–73	Philippines

Hastings Sports Centre, Napier

July 14

Report

National Basketball League Selection (New Zealand)	86–85	Philippines

Pettigrew Green Arena, Napier

July 16

Report

Wellington Saints (New Zealand)	100–96	Philippines
Scoring by quarter: 20–30, 28–22, 24–24, 28–20
Pts: Markson 32		Pts: Norwood 13

Te Rauparaha Arena, Porirua

July 17

Report

Super City Rangers (New Zealand)	75–95	Philippines

St. Kentigerns School Gym, Auckland

July 18

Report

New Zealand	77–76	Philippines

New Zealand

July 26

Report

Philippines	92–89	Kazakhstan
Scoring by quarter: 26–22, 27–29, 23–19, 16–19
Pts: Castro, Chan 20		Pts: Johnson 17

Smart Araneta Coliseum, Quezon City

== Roster ==
Philippines national basketball team – 2013 FIBA Asia Championship roster
Players
Coaches

Pos.	No.	Name	Age – Date of birth	Height	Club	Ctr.
PG	4	Jimmy Alapag (C)	35 – December 30, 1977	1.75 m (5 ft 9 in)	Talk 'N Text Tropang Texters	(Philippines)
PG	5	LA Tenorio	29 – July 9, 1984	1.75 m (5 ft 9 in)	Barangay Ginebra San Miguel	(Philippines)
G/F	6	Jeff Chan	30 – February 11, 1983	1.89 m (6 ft 2 in)	Rain or Shine Elasto Painters	(Philippines)
PG	7	Jayson Castro	27 – June 30, 1986	1.78 m (5 ft 10 in)	Talk 'N Text Tropang Texters	(Philippines)
SG	8	Gary David	35 – July 13, 1978	1.89 m (6 ft 2 in)	GlobalPort Batang Pier	(Philippines)
PF	9	Ranidel De Ocampo	31 – December 8, 1981	1.97 m (6 ft 6 in)	Talk 'N Text Tropang Texters	(Philippines)
G/F	10	Gabe Norwood	28 – February 9, 1985	1.96 m (6 ft 5 in)	Rain or Shine Elasto Painters	(Philippines)
C	11	Marcus Douthit (NP)	33 – April 15, 1980	2.11 m (6 ft 11 in)	Free Agent	(Philippines)
SG	12	Larry Fonacier	31 – May 13, 1982	1.89 m (6 ft 2 in)	Talk 'N Text Tropang Texters	(Philippines)
C	13	June Mar Fajardo	23 – November 17, 1989	2.11 m (6 ft 11 in)	Petron Blaze Boosters	(Philippines)
F/C	14	Japeth Aguilar	26 – January 25, 1987	2.06 m (6 ft 9 in)	GlobalPort Batang Pier	(Philippines)
F/C	15	Marc Pingris	31 – October 16, 1981	1.98 m (6 ft 6 in)	San Mig Coffee Mixers	(Philippines)

Head coach

- (Philippines) Chot Reyes

Assistant coach(es)

- (United States) Norman Black
- (Philippines) Jong Uichico
- (Philippines) Joshua Reyes
- (Philippines) Nash Racela
- (New Zealand) Tab Baldwin (team consultant)

Legend

- (C) Team captain
- (NP) Naturalized player
- Club – describes last
  club before the tournament
- Age – describes age
  on August 1, 2013

Preceded by 2012	Philippines national basketball team results 2013	Succeeded by 2014
