= Magnolia Chicken Timplados Hotshots =

Philippine professional basketball team

- 2025–26 Magnolia Chicken Timplados Hotshots season
- Founded: 1988
- History: List: Purefoods Hotdogs (1988–1990) Purefoods Tender Juicy Hotdogs (1991–92, 1993, 1994–1996, 1998–2005) Coney Island Ice Cream Stars (1993, 1994) Purefoods Oodles (1993) Purefoods Corned Beef Cowboys (1997) Purefoods Carne Norte Beefies (1997–98) Purefoods Chunkee Giants (2005–2007) Purefoods Tender Juicy Giants (2007–2010) B-Meg Derby Ace Llamados (2010–11) B-Meg Llamados (2011–12) San Mig Coffee Mixers (2012–13) San Mig Super Coffee Mixers (2013–14) Purefoods Star Hotshots (2014–15) Star Hotshots (2015–2017) Magnolia Hotshots Pambansang Manok (2017–2020) Magnolia Pambansang Manok Hotshots (2021–2022) Magnolia Chicken Timplados Hotshots (2022–present)
- Team colors: Blue, yellow, white
- Company: San Miguel Food and Beverage, Inc.
- Board governor: Jason Webb
- Team manager: Alvin Patrimonio
- Head coach: LA Tenorio
- Team captain: Zavier Lucero
- Ownership: Ramon S. Ang
- Championships: 14 championships List: 1990 Third Conference 1991 All-Filipino 1993 All-Filipino 1994 Commissioner's 1997 All-Filipino 2002 Governors' 2006 Philippine 2009–10 Philippine 2012 Commissioner's 2013 Governors' 2013–14 Philippine 2014 Commissioner's 2014 Governors' 2018 Governors' 32 finals appearances
- Retired numbers: 5 (7, 8, 15, 16, 44)
Light uniform	Dark uniform

The Magnolia Chicken Timplados Hotshots, or simply known as the Magnolia Hotshots, are a professional basketball team in the Philippine Basketball Association. The team is owned by San Miguel Food and Beverage, Inc., a subsidiary of San Miguel Corporation (SMC). The team is one of three PBA ball clubs currently owned by the SMC group of companies, along with Barangay Ginebra San Miguel and the San Miguel Beermen. They have 14 PBA championships, tied with the Alaska Aces for the third-most overall.

The franchise plays under numerous brand names of the company but is best known by its original name, Purefoods. It remains as one of the most popular teams in the PBA, winning fourteen PBA titles and is the fourth team in PBA history to win a Grand Slam.

The players most identified with the franchise are Alvin Patrimonio, James Yap, and Marc Pingris, among others. Patrimonio, a Mapua University standout, led the franchise to six championships and was named Most Valuable Player four times. Patrimonio retired in 2004 and currently serves as its team manager. Yap led Purefoods to seven titles including a notable grand slam in 2013–14, which is the only grand slam in the history of the franchise and received multiple MVP awards as well. While Pingris was named to the PBA's 40 greatest players playing alongside Yap as the team's enforcer and rebounder. He was a vocal leader of the famous 2013 Gilas Pilipinas team that defeated South Korea and bagged a medal.

== History ==
Prior to joining the PBA in 1988, Purefoods was a member of the Philippine Amateur Basketball League (PABL, later renamed the Philippine Basketball League) and was one of the strongest teams during its tenure with the amateur league. In early 1988, Pure Foods Corporation (then, a subsidiary of Ayala Corporation) acquired the PBA franchise of the original Tanduay team, after Elizalde & Company, Inc. announced it was leaving the PBA.

In 2001, Pure Foods Corporation, including its PBA franchise, was sold by Ayala Corporation to San Miguel Corporation. The following year, Pure Foods Corporation was renamed San Miguel Pure Foods Company, Inc. The franchise continued to play under the Purefoods banner until 2010.

Beginning 2010, the franchise played under other brand names of the company – B-Meg (from 2010 to 2012), San Mig Coffee (from 2012 to 2014) and Star (from 2014 to 2017). Beginning the 2017–18 PBA season, the team started playing under the Magnolia Chicken brand name.

=== 1988–1999: The Patromonio and Codiñera era ===
==== 1988–1989: Early years ====
As part of the deal to join the league, Purefoods was allowed to take some amateur players from the PABL and the national team. Purefoods then drafted Alvin Patrimonio, Jojo Lastimosa, Jerry Codiñera, Glenn Capacio and the number one overall pick of the rookie draft that year; Jack Tanuan. They also added Al Solis and Totoy Marquez from Shell. However, there was a surrounding controversy on the case of Patrimonio, as his PABL team Swift denied Patrimonio's release. The issue was settled before the All-Filipino Conference though, and Patrimonio joined the team.

Purefoods also took the core of the defunct Tanduay squad, namely, Ramon Fernandez, who was designated playing-coach, Freddie Hubalde, Padim Israel, Willie Generalao, Victor Sanchez, JB Yango and Onchie dela Cruz. David Thirdkill, who led Tanduay to the previous year's Open Conference championship and was named Best Import of the conference, was hired as Purefoods' reinforcement for the Open Conference this time.

In their first conference, Purefoods made a historic run to the finals against the Norman Black-led San Miguel Beermen in seven games. In the next conference, Cris Calilan replaced Fernandez as head coach after the first round of the eliminations. They met crowd favorite Añejo Rhum 65 in the finals. Purefoods lost the series 3–1 against a veteran and rugged team of playing coach Robert Jaworski. Controversy arose during the series as Fernandez was ordered to be benched by then-Purefoods Corporation president Rene Buhain amid rumors of game-fixing. This issue led to Fernandez's transfer to San Miguel for Abet Guidaben late in the season. Lastimosa was named as the 1988 Rookie of the Year at the end of the season.

In 1989, Purefoods lost in six games to San Miguel in the All-Filipino Conference. An incident also happened during the second round of the eliminations of that conference when Samboy Lim nearly suffered a career-ending injury when he drove over Lastimosa causing him to fall off-balance and hit head first on the parquet floor. This happened on July 18, 1989, with Purefoods winning 125–115. There was a huge public outcry after that game with many fans decrying Lastimosa's actions as dirty.

==== 1990–1999: A decade of contention ====
In the season-ending 1990 Reinforced Conference, Purefoods took on Alaska Air Force for the title. This conference featured two imports and Purefoods tapped the services of Daren Queenan and Rob Rose, who replaced Walker Russell during the elimination round. The Air Force took a 2–0 lead with a win away to clinch the best of five series. However, the team of legendary coach Baby Dalupan led a stunning comeback to win the series 3–2, giving the franchise its first PBA title. The championship was Dalupan's last but it made him the first coach in PBA history to win PBA championships in three different decades. The other coach who achieved this feat was Norman Black and Tim Cone.

During the offseason, Purefoods traded Lastimosa to Alaska for Cabahug and Al Solis to Sarsi for Jun Tan. They also signed free agent swingman Elmer Reyes.

In 1991, Patrimonio was offered a 5-year, PhP 25 million deal by Pepsi Cola, which was matched by Purefoods. With the development, he became the highest paid player in the league. With this, Purefoods was able to beat Sarsi to win the 1991 All-Filipino Conference under head coach Ely Capacio. Patrimonio won the 1991 Most Valuable Player, the first of a record-tying four MVPs he had won.

Purefoods failed to defend the crown in 1992, losing in seven games to San Miguel.

In 1993, the team was renamed as the Coney Island Ice Cream Stars, an ice cream brand owned by Pure Foods Corporation. They drafted four rookies that year – Dwight Lago, Benny Cheng, Freddie Abuda, and Olsen Racela; and acquired veteran forward Abe King from the disbanded Presto team. The Stars won the 1993 All-Filipino Cup defeating San Miguel, 4–2. Their head coach was Chot Reyes, who achieved a milestone for winning the title in his first conference as coach.

Coney Island was renamed Purefoods Oodles during the Commissioner's Cup. They were bannered by Patrimonio, Codiñera, and Dindo Pumaren, with Capacio, Cabahug, King, and Racela completed the supporting cast. For their reinforcement, they hired Ronnie Grandison who was able to take them straight to the finals. They had a chance to win back-to-back PBA titles but were defeated by corporate rival Swift in six games for the crown of the said tournament. Patrimonio won his second Most Valuable Player award after the season.

In the Governors' Cup, Purefoods Oodles reverted to Purefoods Tender Juicy Hotdogs. With import Tharon Mayes, they had a record of 7–3 in the eliminations, but were eliminated in the semifinals with a record of 9–9.

For the 1994 All-Filipino Conference, the team drafted three rookies – Rey Evangelista, Vince Hizon, and Peter Naron. The Stars also added another rookie in Richie Ticzon whom they acquired through a draft-day trade that sent veteran point guard Pumaren and Lago to Pepsi Mega. To add experience to the roster, Coney Island traded incoming sophomore Cheng to Ginebra for veteran Manny Victorino and acquired 1992 Rookie of the Year Bong Ravena from San Miguel in exchange for Kevin Ramas. The league gave an incentive to the champion of the said conference to have the honor of representing the country in the 1994 Asian Games in Hiroshima, Japan. But Coney Island lost in six games to San Miguel for the All-Filipino Cup title, thus forfeiting the opportunity. Nonetheless, when the Beermen line-up was decimated with several injuries to their key players, they had to reinforce with Purefoods' Patrimonio, Codiñera, and Evangelista. Johnny Abarrientos of Alaska was also included in the team that placed fourth in the Asian Games.

In the Commissioner's Cup, with Kenny Redfield as import, Purefoods won the title in a hard-fought series against the formidable Alaska Milkmen. Patrimonio won the Best Player of the Conference award, becoming only the second player (after teammate Jerry Codiñera who won it previously in the All-Filipino Cup) in PBA history to win the citation. Their reinforcement, Redfield took home the Best Import of the conference honors. It was also during this tournament that he was dubbed "Triple-Double Artist" by the media, as a testament to his all-around skills.

Patrimonio won his second consecutive MVP and third overall. Evangelista was a prime candidate to win the Rookie of the Year award but lost to Swift's Boybits Victoria. Another disappointment for Evangelista was that he was not included in the All-Defensive Team, contrary to what was expected by most, especially the Purefoods fans.

In 1995, Purefoods failed to enter the championship of the three conferences allotted, showing only two fourth-place finishes in the All-Filipino and the Commissioner's Cup. It was the first time in the team's eight-year history that they failed to make it to the All-Filipino finals. It was also the first time that they didn't make any finals appearance in a single season.

During the offseason, Purefoods retooled its lineup by drafting Rodney Santos and reacquiring former Purefoods players Pumaren and Tanuan through trades conducted with Pepsi and Sta. Lucia respectively.

The TJ Hotdogs met Alaska in the finals of the All-Filipino Conference in 1996 PBA season but was defeated in five games by the eventual grand slam winning Milkmen.

In the Governors' Cup, Purefoods struggled as they fielded in several imports in hopes of reversing their misfortunes. After the season, Reyes left the Purefoods team to become the head coach of Sta. Lucia Realty.

In 1997 PBA season, rookie coach Eric Altamirano took over as coach of the Purefoods Corned Beef Cowboys. In his very first conference, Purefoods won the All-Filipino Cup defeating the Gordon's Gin Boars in six games for their first title in three years.

In the Commissioner's Cup, the newly christened Purefoods Carne Norte Beefies performed poorly. They also lost in the finals of the Governors' Cup to Alaska, 4–1. Their import was Mike Jones, who lost in a battle for Best Import honors.

Patrimonio won his fourth and final Most Valuable Player Award, tying former teammate and idol Ramon Fernandez for the most number of MVP awards won.

After getting booted out of the semifinals of the 1998 All-Filipino Cup, Altamirano left Purefoods to join Mobiline. Chito Narvasa became his replacement but failed to lead Purefoods to a finals appearance.

Purefoods struggled in the 1999 PBA season All-Filipino Cup despite acquiring Filipino-American Al Segova and a new head coach in Derrick Pumaren. During the Commissioner's Cup, Codiñera was traded to Mobiline for Andy Seigle. The trade ended the long-time partnership of Patrimonio and Codiñera, who was known as the "Defense Minister." Segova was later banished after he was proven to be a fake Filipino-American. Purefoods failed to get past the quarterfinals of the first two conferences. They were ousted by Alaska Milk in a 3-game sweep despite finishing first at the end of the elimination round with a 7–1 card and lost their last 4 games after winning 6 in a row (8–1 record after the quarterfinals) in the season ending Governors' Cup. Derrick "The Flight" Brown led all imports in scoring and rebounding but was edged out by San Miguel import Lamont Strothers in the balloting for best import honors.

=== 2000–2004: Transition period ===
==== 2000: Final year under Ayala Corporation ====
In the 2000 All-Filipino Cup, a forfeiture of games won by Tanduay Gold during the semifinals series (for fielding fake Filipino-American Sonny Alvarado in Games 2 and 3 won by the Rhum Masters) set the stage for Boyet Fernandez' buzzer beating shot in overtime of game 4. That shot catapulted the TJ Hotdogs to the finals, which they lost to Alaska.

Brown won Best Import honors after leading the TJ Hotdogs to the finals of the Governors' Cup, which they lost to San Miguel. It was the second time that a Purefoods import won the said award. (Brown would go on to win a second one in 2002 in the same conference). Also, Patrimonio found his way back to the Mythical Five selection.

Pumaren left Purefoods after the 2000 season and signed up with Tanduay Gold. Replacing him was the returning Altamirano for his second tour of duty with Purefoods.

==== 2001–2003: First years under San Miguel Corporation ====
A distraction affected the team off the court when the Ayala Corporation sold Pure Foods Corporation (including its PBA franchise) to San Miguel Corporation. The problem with this development was that SMC already had two PBA ballclubs in San Miguel Beer and Barangay Ginebra, and it was not allowed by the league for a company to own three teams in the league. This meant that either the Ayala group had to retain their team under a new banner or for SMC to disband the team after the season. Eventually, the PBA Board of Governors adjusted the rule and allowed the Purefoods PBA franchise to be acquired by SMC and to remain an active team.

In 2002, Pure Foods Corporation would be renamed San Miguel Pure Foods Company, Inc.

The TJ Hotdogs lost to Batang Red Bull 2–3 in a best-of-5 semifinals series. Despite their unexpected good showing in the Commissioner's Cup, they struggled in the last conference of the season, and never made it past the elimination round.

Noy Castillo was named Most Improved Player of the 2001 season after leading the TJ Hotdogs in scoring throughout the year.

In 2002, they got Kerby Raymundo from Red Bull as the new main man for the team.

Altamirano concentrated his duties with the national team in 2002 as an assistant coach. Taking over for a while was his assistant, Ryan Gregorio. Gregorio led Purefoods to a successful championship run in the Governors' Cup defeating Alaska in seven games after trailing 0–2. It marked the second time they've beaten Alaska in a finals series despite dropping the first two games. Kerby Raymundo, acquired from Red Bull prior to the start of the tournament, was the Finals MVP. Brown was the conference's Best Import while Evangelista was the Best Player of the Conference.

However, Purefoods became a mediocre team in the Commissioner's Cup and the All-Filipino Cup finishing dead last in the succeeding conferences of the season.

After the season, Ronnie Magsanoc won the Comeback Player of the Year Award and announced his retirement after he received the award. Gregorio and Coca-Cola mentor Chot Reyes was named co-winners of the Coach of the Year Award.

In 2003, Gregorio was named as the head coach of the team as Altamirano was reassigned to the traveling SMC All-Stars (composed of former PBA all-stars). Purefoods each failed to enter the quarterfinals of the three conferences. In the Reinforced Conference, they had former NBA protege Lenny Cooke, but Cooke later suffered an injury, causing the Hotdogs not to qualify for the quarterfinals. It was the first season that Purefoods failed to make the 20 win mark with a dismal 9–27 win loss card (a franchise low).

==== 2004: James Yap's arrival and Alvin Patrimonio's final year ====
James Yap was the second overall pick for Purefoods Tender Juicy Hotdogs in the 2004 PBA draft. He received multiple Most Valuable Player awards during his tenure with Purefoods. His teammate PJ Simon was also named an All-Star while playing for the franchise.

During Patrimonio's birthday celebration on November 26, 2004 (Patrimonio's birthday was on November 17), he announced his retirement in an emotional speech, ending his illustrious 16-year career to concentrate his role as team manager. His number was retired in December, becoming the first Purefoods player to have his jersey retired. Purefoods was the only team Patrimonio played for in the PBA.

The rebuilding process began for Purefoods despite a dismal showing in the 2004 PBA Fiesta Conference. In the 2004–05 Philippine Cup, Purefoods was eliminated by Shell in the quarterfinals. Same can be said in the 2005 Fiesta Conference, when the Turbo Chargers eliminated them in the same predicament.

=== 2005–2016: The Yap and Pingris era ===
==== 2005–2010: New talents emerge and the end of the Purefoods era ====
Prior to the start of the 2005–06 Fiesta Conference, Purefoods replaced their TJ Hotdogs moniker with the Chunkee Giants. The Chunkee Giants was a reference to the company's new chunky corned beef product Purefoods Chunkee Corned Beef. Purefoods selected PBL MVP Jondan Salvador with the fourth pick in the first round of the draft. To further strengthen its line-up, the team traded future draft picks to Air21 to acquire Marc Pingris and Egay Billones. They also signed veteran guard Roger Yap. They also hired Marquin Chandler as import and went on to record a 10–6 first-place finish in the classification phase, earning them an outright semis berth.

The Giants beat the up-and-coming Express in six games of the semifinals. They lost in the finals of the tournament to Red Bull in six games. But their runner-up finish was the best since winning the 2002 Governors' Cup. Chandler won Best Import honors while Raymundo lost to Enrico Villanueva for Best Player of the Conference honors.

In the 2006 PBA Philippine Cup, the Chunkee Giants finished with a 12–4 record and a first-place finish in the classification phase, earning them an outright semifinals berth for the second consecutive time. However, on May 14, in a game against Red Bull, Eugene Tejada suffered a freak injury, which resulted to his paralyzation. In the semifinals, Purefoods won the series in seven games after trailing Alaska 1–3, becoming only the second team since the 1991 Ginebra San Miguel team to come back from a 1–3 deficit in a PBA best-of-seven series. In six games, the Chunkee Giants won the 2006 Philippine Cup, 4–2, over Red Bull. It was Purefoods' first title since the 2002 Governors' Cup, and the first All-Filipino Cup title since 1997. Pingris was named as the Finals MVP.

Yap became the second Purefoods player to win season MVP award and was included in the Mythical Team. Raymundo and Roger Yap were also named to the mythical team

In the succeeding 2006–07 season, Purefoods managed to end up with a 10–8 win–loss record. In a playoff game for the second outright quarterfinals berth, the Giants came-from-behind to beat Sta. Lucia to avoid going further down to the grueling wild-card phase.

In the best-of-five quarterfinals, the Chunkee Giants lost to Talk 'N Text, 3–1. After Pingris got injured in game 2, Purefoods lost the next three games, thus failing to repeat as champions of the Philippine Cup.

Purefoods renamed the team to the Tender Juicy Giants for the 2007 PBA Fiesta Conference. However, the team paraded a depleted line-up. Forward-centers Kerby Raymundo and Marc Pingris were loaned to the national team and placed on injured list, respectively. James Yap was also facing issues regarding his marital problems with wife Kris and being snubbed from the National Team. Although Marquin Chandler returned for a second tour of duty with Purefoods, the team had a badly depleted front line that saw them only Richard Yee and Arnold Gamboa manning the slot. Enter PJ Simon, the scoring apostle. he led the team in scoring, and the Giants decided to get the next big man available in the PBA to help the team. As a result, they acquired Rommel Adducul from the San Miguel Beermen through a three-team trade with the Red Bull Barako which also saw Enrico Villanueva donning a Beermen jersey. Reserve Don Camaso was the casualty of the trade as he was sent to Red Bull. Some PBA teams denounced the trade transaction because of the "restricted player" trade rule in which only top players could be traded for one another to avoid imbalance in the league. But the protests quickly subsided after the PBA approved the said trade after learning that Villanueva was removed from the restricted list and Adducul was finally allowed to play for the Giants.

Purefoods was able to escape early elimination after beating the Welcoat Dragons in the last elimination round game. James Yap scored 41 points to lead the Giants to the wildcard phase, only to be knocked out by the Coca-Cola Tigers where he scored 40 points, which equaled former PBA player Nelson Asaytono's record of scoring 40+ points in back-to-back games, but failed to deliver the win for the team. For his efforts, Yap was picked by Chot Reyes to be part of the national team to play for the 2007 FIBA Asia Championship in Tokushima, Japan where the Philippines finished ninth out of the 16 teams.

With no picks in the 2007 PBA draft, the TJ Giants welcomed back Raymundo and Pingris to the team, while trading Paul Artadi to the Air21 Express for virtually nothing after a feud with the coaches (Artadi ended up playing in Ginebra). The Giants then had a 7–0 start at the 2007–08 PBA Philippine Cup with Yap having a banner conference. Despite losing the Christmas Day game against fierce rival Barangay Ginebra Kings, the Giants clinched the semifinals berth and the #1 seed on their next game thanks to a win against the Tigers. In the semifinals, they were up against Red Bull, the winner over the Magnolia Beverage Masters in the quarterfinals series. The Giants drew first blood in the semifinals by routing Red Bull but needed to win the 7th game to finally clinch their 12th AFC finals stint (the most by any team in history) against Sta. Lucia.

Purefoods lost a controversial 7 game series with Yap serving a suspension in game 5 after the Giants had come back a 0–2 deficit to tie the series at 2–2. They managed to level the series at 3–3 thanks to a classic fourth quarter performance by James Yap, nailing 5 of 6 three point attempts and scoring 20 points in the fourth quarter. Game 7 was almost a carbon copy of game number 6. Purefoods struggled in the third quarter with key players in foul trouble, and in the end it was Sta. Lucia who made the crucial shots down the stretch and won the game 100–88.

Before the start of the succeeding Fiesta Conference, Rommel Adducul was diagnosed with cancer and had to take a leave of absence. Lacking a starting center, Purefoods was forced to make a deal for Enrico Villanueva and sacrifice Marc Pingris, who went to the Magnolia Beverage Masters in a four-team, multi-player transaction. For their reinforcement, they tapped the services of 6'11" Darius Rice. Rice was a prolific scorer but was not able to lead the team to enough wins for the Giants to keep him. He was replaced by Moroccan Reda Rhalimi, who was decent enough on both ends of the floor, but was also unable to lead the Giants to an impressive finish. They ended up with a 7–11 win–loss card in the classification phase.

The knockout wildcard match-up against Talk 'N Text accentuated the frustrations that have marked the Giants' campaign. With the team trailing by 16 points halfway through the fourth, Jondan Salvador got involved in an altercation against the Phone Pals' import Terrence Leather. After the import threw the ball at Salvador, Yap retaliated with a kick, which in turn caused players from both benches to join the fray. With the situation almost resulting in a disastrous brawl, cooler heads eventually prevailed, penalties were given and the game came to an end—as well as the Giants' season.

The controversial blow-out loss at the Ynares center turned out to be the last game of Castillo and Evangelista as professional basketball players. Castillo retired while Evangelista joined the Giants' coaching staff. Evangelista played his entire career with the Purefoods franchise that drafted him second overall in 1994. He won four championships with Purefoods and was known as a solid defender and rebounder. Castillo, on the other hand, was dreaded for his clutch baskets and was a consistent marksman throughout his career. He won a championship with the team in 2006 PBA Philippine Cup.

Before the start of the 2008–2009 KFC PBA Philippine Cup, the TJ Giants and their fans once again got into trouble with the Singapore Slingers audience during an exhibition game. The Giants lost to the Slingers in that heated match, but ironically, they signed Slinger Al Vergara for a single conference contract in the 2009 Motolite PBA Fiesta Conference.

In the off-season, Purefoods overhauled its roster by bringing in rookies Beau Belga, Jonathan Fernandez, and Richard Alonzo. They also acquired veterans Topex Robinson and Paolo Bugia from Red Bull and Aaron Aban from Alaska. These moves, however, were all futile attempts at establishing team chemistry as the team failed to excel at the classification phase, even after acquiring Rich Alvarez in mid-conference and having Adducul back from cancer treatment.

Having to play in yet another wildcard phase, the Giants continued their struggle in the 2008–2009 Philippine Cup. During a timeout in a knockout game against Air21, Yap and Purefoods assistant coach Koy Banal exchanged harsh words which caused a stir in the team's huddle. Moments later, Raymundo rushed to the other side of the court to confront Air21 fans. The Express went on to win the game, ending the Purefoods' campaign.

To settle the issue between Yap and Banal, the team's officials called for an emergency meeting right after the loss to Air21. The whole team stayed up late to talk things over, and the two eventually reconciled.

Before the start of the 2009 Motolite PBA Fiesta Conference, the team made a move in a three-way trade with Ginebra and Burger King, they let go of the young players remaining in their roster---Beau Belga, Chad Alonzo, and Chico Lañete. In return, they got grizzled veterans Don Allado and Niño Canaleta. They also signed free agent Al Vergara of the Singapore Slingers for a one-conference contract.

With resident import Marquin Chandler still playing in Korea, the Giants brought in Brian Hamilton, who led them to an impressive 2–0 start but was eventually replaced by Jhamar Thorpe after a mediocre showing. Thorpe also turned out to be sub-par and was thus replaced by the original choice Chandler, who led the team to three straight victories upon his return, only to see it lose the next three.

Just before the All-Star break, the management continued to tinker with the team's roster. In another transaction involving the Gin Kings and the Whoppers, the Giants acquired veteran point guard Celino Cruz and gave up Aaron Aban. To make room for Cruz in its roster, the team released Vergara from his duties.

During the All-Star break, Yap won the three-point shootout. Canaleta, who won the Slam Dunk competition three times when he was with Air21, failed to get back the title. Raymundo and Yap were key performers for the Powerade-Team Pilipinas in their three-game exhibition match with the PBA All-stars. Villanueva and Simon played for the North and South All-Stars respectively.

With a 7–7 win–loss card, the Giants faced Talk 'N Text in a knockout wildcard duel. Even with Chandler fouling out in the fourth quarter, the Giants' local crew kept the game close, trailing by only three points, 97–100, with seven seconds left. Raymundo was fouled while shooting a desperation three-pointer that tied the game at 100-all, but he missed the potential game-winning free throw with 1.7 seconds left. In the extension period, Purefoods appeared to have sealed the victory with Roger Yap sinking two free throws to increase their lead to twelve, 114–102, with less than two minutes remaining. But Mark Cardona and Ren-Ren Ritualo made four consecutive triples for the Tropang Texters to force another overtime. The Giants, however resilient the Tropang Texters were, prevailed at the end behind the heroics of the Yap duo. The victory earned Purefoods the last ticket to the quarterfinals against Rain or Shine.

With tired players, Purefoods lost to the Elasto Painters in Game 1 of the quarterfinals. The following game, the Giants came back strong, leading by as much as 24 points late in the third. Nonetheless, Rain or Shine did not readily gave up, shutting the Giants' offense down and eventually tying the game with 22 seconds to go. Jai Lewis missed the possible go-ahead free throw, giving the Giants a chance to score the winning basket with the shot clock turned off. Chandler drove to the basket, got fouled, and drained two free throws with 1.2 seconds left. Off the timeout, Rob Wainwright missed the jumper and Purefoods tied the series.

Game 3 saw the Giants leading most of the second half, behind Simon's high scoring game. Chandler was benched after letting his emotions get the best of him in the first half. He never saw action again in the second half, where Rain or Shine kept the game close. This paved the way for TY Tang to sink the go-ahead three-pointer with 31.2 seconds left. With the loss, Purefoods were denied a slot in the semifinals and their long off-season began.

After a dismal performance in the 34th PBA season, the Giants geared up for a promising 35th by figuring in big transactions in the off-season. First, they re-acquired the services of 2006 Finals MVP Marc Pingris by giving up future picks to Burger King. The Whoppers earlier acquired Pingris from San Miguel in the Arwind Santos trade. Within the next two days, Pingris was eventually shipped back to Purefoods on the said follow-up deal in exchange for a draft pick.

Another cause for optimism in the Purefoods organization is having the second overall pick of the 2009 PBA draft. Amid rumors of giving up marquee players to Burger King to get top prospect Japeth Aguilar first overall, the Giants eventually called the negotiations off and settled for no. 2 at the draft. Thus, Aguilar went to the Whoppers, while the Giants picked former De La Salle University Archer Rico Maierhofer.

In an effort to solve the duplications in several positions, the Giants engaged in a multi-player deal with sister team Barangay Ginebra. Burger King was willing to act as the conduit for this intra-company exchange, and thus the player carousel began. The Gin Kings bulked up their frontline by acquiring Enrico Villanueva, Paolo Bugia, and Rich Alvarez from Purefoods. They also deepened their backcourt rotation by taking Celino Cruz from the Giants and Pocholo Villanueva from the Whoppers. The Giants got Rafi Reavis, Paul Artadi, and Chris Timberlake. The Whoppers also landed rookie Orlando Daroya who was the Gin Kings' first round choice.

Despite the roster build-up in the offseason, the Giants had a roller coaster ride in the first round of the Classification Phase of the 2009–2010 KFC PBA Philippine Cup. They struggled to win back-to-back games even with its balanced line-up and an impressive performance by the rookie Rico Maierhofer. They won the season opener (October 11) against Burger King, but lost some games in dismal fashion, including an upset by the Asi Taulava-less Coke Tigers just before the Halloween break. They ended the first round with a mediocre 5–4 record, capped by a win over Sta. Lucia in an out-of-town game.

Purefoods, whom many people dubbed as one of the teams to beat for the said tournament, finally scored back-to-back wins on December 2 against Coca-Cola. During the same gameday, Purefoods-Hormel celebrated 10 years of partnership. The event saw the unveiling of TJ, the new team mascot, a halftime show for the kids, and the Giants wearing commemorative jerseys. Purefoods strung up two more wins against Brgy. Ginebra and Barako Bull to extend its winning streak to four.

Powerhouse San Miguel put an end to the Giants' streak in mid-December. As it was the second time the Beermeen dominated the Giants, and league-leading Alaska also defeated the team in the first round, doubts were raised whether Purefoods could really hold its own against the contenders. The team also lost to Talk N' Text just before the Christmas break, dampening its hopes of securing one of the two outright semifinal slots.

Purefoods bounced back from its consecutive losses by beating Burger King on Christmas Day. They followed it up with a no-bearing win against the guest team, Smart Gilas to start the New Year. Purefoods also swept the rest of its schedule, with the streak highlighted by a convincing win over the league-leading Alaska on January 15. Because Alaska and San Miguel did well in the first round of the Eliminations, the Giants failed to steal an outright semifinal slot from the Aces, who needed to win their last scheduled game to avoid a tie-breaker with Purefoods. The Giants ended the classification phase with a record of 12–6, third overall in the standings, which gave them an outright quarterfinal slot. In the quarters, the Giants extended their win streak to six by winning the first two games of their series with Rain or Shine.

The Elasto Painters came back strong to win games 3 and 4 and force a do-or-die game 5. Purefoods had a hard time guarding outside snipers like Jeff Chan and Mike Hrabak in game 3. In game 4, the Giants rallied to overcome a 16-point 4th Quarter deficit, to snatch the lead with a minute to go. But Eddie Laure hit a well-defended three-pointer to put Rain or Shine back on top, and the Giants failed to score another point. The struggle continued through the first half of game 5, before the Giants eventually realized they are the better team, and put the series away for good.

After a near-death experience with the Elasto Painters, the Giants found themselves on a collision course with second seed San Miguel Beer for a best-of-seven semifinal series. The Beermen took game 1 with ease, but the Giants adjusted well in game 2 to even the series. In game 3, the Beermen once again won by a huge margin, causing everyone to think that they had already taken control of the series. Little did they know that the Giants, led by Roger Yap's and James Yap's POW performances would win the next three games en route to their 13th All-Filipino finals appearance in franchise history.

Sweeps are usually uneventful match-ups, with a superior team bullying the other into lopsided games. This was not the case in the Purefoods-Alaska series wherein Purefoods led by no more than 3 points in its first three wins. In game 2, a controversial call occurred when Kerby Raymundo got Joe DeVance to bite into his shot fake causing a slight contact with 1.7 seconds left and the game was tied. Arguments were raised whether the contact was enough to merit a call, but the referees eventually decided on a foul and awarded Raymundo two free throws, the first of which he made; the second he intentionally missed. In game 3, Willie Miller of Alaska had a chance to steal the victory in the dying seconds, but missed a possible game-winner at the buzzer. With their tough defense and a deeper rotation, the Giants cruised to a convincing game 4 victory, sealing the series and claiming their 8th title. It was also their 5th All-Filipino title, tying Crispa for most number of championships in that prestigious tournament.

Just before the game, James Yap was awarded the Best Player of the Conference plaque. Later that night, he also took home the Finals MVP award.

==== 2010–2011: The rebrand to B-Meg ====
In March 2010, SMC announced that Purefoods Tender Juicy Giants were to be renamed as the B-Meg Derby Ace Llamados starting 2010 PBA Fiesta Conference. The team's name was shortened to B-Meg Llamados starting the 2011 PBA Governors Cup.

On June 1, 2011 B-Meg Llamados offered Air21 a 2-on-1 deal; it will be Jondan Salvador and multi-titled slam dunk champion KG Canaleta for top 2007 PBA Draftee Joe Devance. Devance, a former University of Texas-El Paso stalwart, was shipped by Alaska to the Express for Jay-R Reyes on May 28, 2011. On June 3, 2011, PBA commissioner Chito Salud approved a Devance trade to B-Meg. After two days of studying the trade transaction, Salud approved the two-team, three-player deal. "Two big men in exchange for Devance? I think that's fair enough," he told GMA News. "But it took me two days before I finally made a decision because I wanted to carefully study the trade. In the end, I felt the trade is fair both squads."

==== 2011–2012: Mark Barroca's arrival ====
Multi-titled veteran PBA coach Tim Cone signed as the head coach with champion team, B-Meg.

On October 5, 2011, Cone made his debut as B-Meg's head coach against Petron Blaze. They lost their first game in a score of 69–73. Since Cone debuted, he influenced the B-Meg coaching staff to wear long-sleeve shirt and necktie.

On November 16, PBA commissioner Chito Salud approved of a trade that sent Allein Maliksi and former Rookie of the Year Rico Maierhofer to Barangay Ginebra, Jimbo Aquino and 2013 1st round pick (Ginebra) to Barako Bull, and 2002 PBA 1st overall pick Yancy de Ocampo and 2012 2nd round pick (Ginebra) to B-Meg.

Former Finals MVP Raymundo was traded to Barangay Ginebra for JC Intal

May 6, 2012, B-Meg finished the series in game 7 against Talk 'N Text Tropang Texters for the 2012 PBA Commissioner's Cup finals. B-Meg was down by two 74–76 with 1.2 seconds remaining, when Denzel Bowles hit the game-tying two free throws to the delight of the mammoth Sunday crowd of 21,046 at the Smart Araneta Coliseum. Late in the game between the Texters and the Llamados, there was confusion amid the roar of the crowd, as people thought the game was already over, and just like in 1980, a banner bearing the name of Talk 'N Text was already brought out at the Smart Araneta Coliseum. It turned out that the Llamados still had a lease on life, as Bowles was fouled by Kelly Williams with 1.7 seconds left. The 23-year-old import made both of his free throws to send the game into overtime, where B-Meg pounced on the shorthanded TNT team for their 9th title.

Devance and Intal weren't able to play much because of injuries but B-Meg once again booked a ticket to the 2012 Governors' Cup Finals against Rain or Shine after beating Barangay Ginebra, 74–72 courtesy of a Peter June Simon follow up. B-Meg dropped their first game 91–80, but the resilient Llamados bounced back and defeated Rain or Shine 85–80, where Yap was named Best Player of the Game with 24 pts, 9 rebound performance. But B-Meg lost two straight with a 93–84 (where Cone benched his superstars in the final quarter and put Marqus Blakey and Pingris back in just few minutes remaining) and 94–89 respectively and RoS led the series 3–1. But Yap exploded for a conference high 57 points and dedicated his performance to the late former president Corazon Aquino, his former mother-in-law as they defeated the E-Painters,91–81. He scored again with 20 pts in the crucial Game 6 and they won in convincing fashion, 97–81 to tie the series at 3-all with Simon being hailed as the Best Player of the Game. B-Meg looks to be the 4th team to come back from a 1–3 deficit (they accomplished this in 2006). They also look for their first back-to-back championships. However, the Elasto Painters fought hard in Game 7 and defeated B-Meg, 83–76 despite Yap's 23 point performance. The Llamados have missed crucial shots during crunch and their import Blakely being fouled out early in the fourth quarter and Rain or Shine took advantage.

==== 2012–2014: The rebrand to San Mig Coffee and Grand Slam ====
Prior to the start of the 2012–13 PBA season, San Miguel Pure Foods Company, Inc. announced that the team will play under the name San Mig Coffee Mixers. The following season, the team was named San Mig Super Coffee Mixers.

They finished the eliminations with a 10–4 record, grabbing the second seed with the twice to beat, they passed the quarterfinals by winning against Petron Blaze on a twice to beat advantage, but failed to reach the finals by losing against Rain or Shine, 2 to 4.

They finished the eliminations with 8 wins and 6 losses, good for fourth seed, They lost the first game to Meralco on a best-of-three quarterfinals series, they need to win two straight to win the series, they won game two and three, to take it. On the next round however, they lost to Alaska on the semifinals, 3–1. By losing the series, they failed to win the crown again.

On the start of the 2013 Governors' Cup, they finished the eliminations with six wins and three losses, they won the quarterfinals against Alaska and the semifinals against Meralco.

On the Finals, the seven-game series went the distance. In the end, it was the Coffee Mixers who eventually won and defeated powerhouse team Petron Blaze 4–3. The final score was 87–77. Pingris won the Finals MVP Award while Marqus Blakely won the Best Import of the Conference award. It was the first Governors' Cup title for the Coffee Mixers since 2000 and also the 13th PBA title for Cone, tying him with his idol, the legendary Baby Dalupan for the most number of PBA titles in league history.

After their 10th championship, a press conference was made by the team renaming it as San Mig Super Coffee Mixers.

Prior to the start of the 2013-14 PBA Philippine Cup, the Super Coffee Mixers acquired four rookies in the 2013 PBA draft. Ian Sangalang was picked No. 2 overall by the Super Coffee Mixers together with Justin Chua, Justin Melton and JR Cawaling. A few days after the draft, Chua was eventually traded to GlobalPort in exchange for Isaac Holstein, the seventh pick overall of GlobalPort.

Due to a series of injuries that plagued the team at the start of the season together with the recently concluded Governors' Cup Finals that gave them barely a week to prepare for the Philippine Cup, the Super Coffee Mixers struggled to get back to championship form. This resulted to an awful 0–3 start, losing against Barangay Ginebra San Miguel on the opening day, Alaska and Petron Blaze before notching their first win against Air21. The next two games against Rain or Shine and Meralco again resulted in back-to-back losses before winning against Barako Bull and GlobalPort. With a 3–5 standing and the injured players starting to heal, the team tried but with no avail to bounce back against the Alaska and Rain or Shine. Although their final game against the E-Painters held on December 29, 2013 resulted in a 77–101 beating, this proved to be a wake-up call for them as they would end up sweeping their remaining four games against powerhouse teams.

On January 5, 2014, the Super Coffee Mixers defeated Barangay Ginebra 83–79 which improved their standing to 4–7. Six days later, they would end up beating Air21 67–60. Four days later, they would rack up their third straight victory against Petron Blaze with the score 112–93. Their final game held on January 17, 2014 saw the Super Coffee Mixers winning over Talk 'N Text 100–87 and ended the eliminations with a 7–7 record. Their four consecutive wins enabled them to improve their standing from 8th place to 5th going into the quarterfinals and eventually setting up a blockbuster match against the defending champions, the Tropang Texters.

After a 7–7 record on the eliminations of the 2013-14 PBA Philippine Cup with a four-game winning streak, they outlasted Talk 'N Text on their first game in the quarterfinals. They lost to the Texters on Game 2, to force a do-or-die game. But San Mig won Game 3 of the quarterfinals with a great performance from their rookie Justin Melton in a 90–82 win. After that win, they will face Barangay Ginebra in the semifinals in a best-of-seven series.

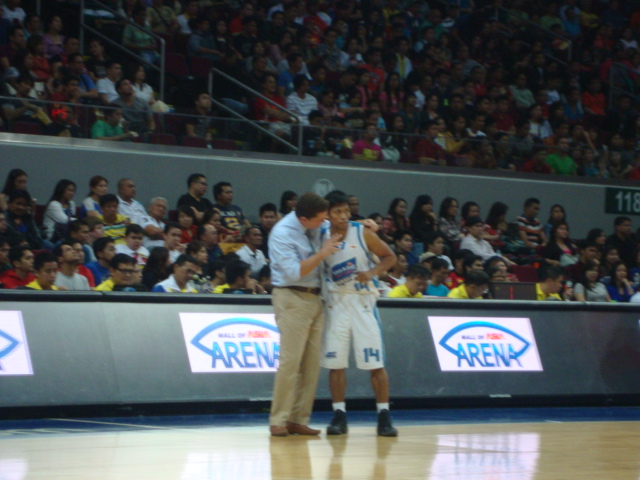
San Mig Coffee coach Tim Cone talks to Mark Barroca during their semifinal game against Barangay Ginebra

They faced Ginebra on the semifinals of the 2013–14 PBA Philippine Cup. The series lasted until Game 7, where they won the series 4–3, 110–87, breaking the record of the highest attendance on a single game with a crowd of 24,883. Many people are watching outside and a millions in their houses.

After a breathtaking semifinals of Manila Clasico, they faced Rain or Shine in the finals. With only a day to rest after a huge win in the semi-finals against Ginebra, they lost game one due to a counter-layup by Paul Lee in the last 1.6 seconds of the game. With 0.9 left on the clock, the Mixers had no timeouts left but still decided to call one so they were levied with a technical foul, Lee hits the technical freethrow, The Mixers tried to hit a three-point beyond halfcourt to tie the game but they failed, the score is 80–83. They eventually won Games 2,3 and 4 (3–1 lead by San Mig). Rain or Shine came back and won Game 5, but the Mixers proved to be a resilient team by beating the E-Painters in Game 6, and winning the Philippine Cup trophy in the process. Barroca was awarded as PBA Press Corps-Papa John's Pizza Finals MVP.

They faced GlobalPort on their debut game on March 12, 2014, they eventually won it 91–75. Ian Sangalang was named the Best Player of the Game, finishing with 16 points. They faced Ginebra on their second game on March 16, 2014., They won the game 90–80, with an outstanding performance by their import, James Mays finishing with 29 points, 29 rebounds, and 6 blocks. They faced Rain or Shine on March 22, 2014, their third game, they won it 91–74. Peter June Simon was named the Best Player of the Game.

After that three-straight victories, the Mixers lost back to back against Barako Bull and Talk 'N Text, they lost to the Energy on March 25, 2014 with a slim margin, crediting Ronjay Buenafe with hitting the two penalty freethrows, after that, 7.7 seconds were left on the clock. Unfortunately, the inbound pass of Barroca for a counter-layup of Mark Barroca did not go in and they lost the game, 90–92. They also lost to the Tropang Texters on March 31, 2014, with a score of 75–81, On the first three quarters, the Texters dominated the game, and even blown the lead to 22, but the Mixers bounced back up to cut the lead down to six, but the Texters held them off to seal the win.

They fought Air21 on April 9, 2014, they won it. They also lost to San Miguel on April 12, 2014, 88–97. After four days they also lost to Meralco 78–88, and again lost to Alaska on April 20, 2014, with a 19-point margin, 66–85. On this game only the bench players played more minutes to rest the star players for the quarterfinals, Cone rested their four star players, Yap, Mays, Simon, and Pingris. They also limited the appearance of Devance, Barroca and Melton to be ready for their quarterfinals matchup.

They lost to the Aces, on Game 1 of the quarterfinals on April 21, 2014. Fighting for their lives, the Mixers eventually won Game 2, 70–65. Pingris still played even though he was injured at the time. They also won the do-or-die game three, with a fourteen-point margin, 79–65. Pingris won back to back honors for the Best Player of the Game.

They fought Air21 on a best-of-five series in the semifinals, the Express eventually won Game 1 on April 27, 2014, to take a 1–0 series lead. In the first three quarters, the Mixers dominated the game, but in the fourth quarter, The Express rallies back, even grabbed the lead 93–88, Asi Taulava on the final one minute and three seconds left on the game clock, drove and got a lay-up, but the Mixers asked for a traveling violation lead by Cone, and was eventually called for two technical fouls and was ejected. The Express got four free throws and sank three of it, to extend the lead, 98–88, but Mays rallied back scoring 12 points in 53 seconds, The Mixers forced to get fouls, the game was even closed to a three-point lead after Sean Anthony missed the penalty freethrow, but the three point attempt of Mays did not go in, and the Express won Game 1, 100–103, Anthony was honored the Best Player of the Game. Game 2 was held on May 1, 2014, and the Mixers won it 82–75, the Mixers also won Game 3 on May 3, 2014 to take the 2–1 lead, 84–73.

The Express eventually won Game 4 on May 5, 2014, to tie the series 2–2, on a 91–94 showdown, but the Mixers won Game 5 and booked the Finals, with a 99–83 showdown on May 7, 2014., Yap was named the Best Player of the Game honors, with a 15-point performance.

They faced undefeated Talk 'N Text. in a best-of-five Finals. San Mig drew first blood in the finals with a 15-point victory in Game 1, 95–80, in the process snapping the 13–0 romp of the TNT team. After the Tropang Texters evened the series 1–1 with an 86–76 victory in Game 2, San Mig regained the upper hand in the series with a nail-biting 77–75 win in Game 3 from a clutch corner shot by Yap over the outstretched arms of Texters defender, Kelly Williams. The team finished off t TNT in Game 4 with a 100–91 fightback to win their third straight championship thus joining a select group of PBA teams to win the golden treble. Yap was named the PBA Press Corps Finals MVP.

They also won Game 3, 77–75. On May 13, 2014, to have a 2–1 lead, and eventually won Game 4 on May 15, 2014, being down 17–1 on the first quarter, they rallied back and won the game 100–91 and won their 12th championship, Yap won the Holcim Cement Finals MVP Award.

Weeks before the start of the 2014 Governors' Cup, the Mixers recruited Marqus Blakely for the third time, to defend their title.

They faced the Barako Bull Energy to start their campaign as the defending champions, on May 21, 2014, and won, 66–76. Peter June Simon was named the Best Player of the Game honors.

They fought the San Miguel Beermen on May 25, 2014, their second game this conference. In the first two quarters, the game was very close, but a run by the Mixers changed the game, and spiked the lead up to eleven in the fourth quarter, but the Beermen proved to be a great team by making a huge run of their own. In the last 10 secs, the Beermen had the lead, 92–87, but James Yap drained a three way downtown to cut the lead to two, 90–92. In the last 5.6 seconds, Reggie Williams was fouled by Blakely, he missed both freethrows. The defending champs got the rebound but Marqus Blakely turned the ball over. The game ended in favor of the Beermen, 90–92. The next played the Meralco Bolts on May 27, 2014, and won, 90–108.

They battled the GlobalPort Batang Pier in their fourth game on May 30, 2014, in the first three quarters the Batang Pier dominated the game but on the fourth the Mixers rallied back from being down 22, and eventually won it, 92–82.

They also played the Barangay Ginebra San Miguel on June 1, 2014, a Manila Clasico matchup in what was considered a heated rivalry. The game was very close until the fourth quarter, but an outrageous 16–0 run was conjured by the Mixers to snatched their third consecutive victory over Barangay Ginebra San Miguel, 102–90.

They fought the Alaska Aces on June 6, 2014, their sixth game this conference, they lost it, 93–84. They crucially fought Air21 Express on June 9, 2014, if they lose, they will not have a chance to enter the playoffs with a twice to beat advantage, so they need to close out this one, they eventually won it, 113–109 at overtime. They fought Talk 'N Text Tropang Texters on June 13, 2014, they lost it, 78–82, and the Rain or Shine Elasto Painters on June 16, although they are assured of a twice to beat berth in the quarterfinals, they need to win this game to grab a second seed, the game was close, they grabbed a one-point lead with 3.0 seconds left on the clock but, Arizona Reid of San Miguel hits the middle jumper, for a one-point lead, one second and one tenths of a second was left in the clock (1.1) but James Yap failed to hit the outside jumper to give the Rain or Shine the second seed, 95–94, they fall to the fourth seed.

They fought the San Miguel Beermen in the quarter-finals, the Beermen, coming in as the fifth seed, needs to overcome the Mixers' twice to beat advantage. The Mixers however won the game, 90–97, to give them a semi-final berth, making this their eight-straight semi-final appearance.

They fought the Talk 'N Text Tropang Texters in the semi-finals, winning game one 88–92, in the overtime period. They also won game two, to grab a 2–0 lead, 85–93. They are now just 6 wins shy of a grand slam. Getting there met a serious road block by losing back to back, and the Texters forced a sudden death. The Mixers though gave themselves a great chance at this historical achievement by winning the 5th and deciding game of the semi-finals, 87–93. This win gave them their fourth straight final appearance, and the sixth time in the last eight conferences.

They fought the Rain or Shine Elasto Painters in the finals, they won game one, 101–104, failed to win game two, 87–89, won game three, 69–78, failed to win game four, 88–79. Tied 2–2, the 5th and final game of the finals will decide if the Mixers will complete their first ever traditional Grand Slam and also their fourth straight championship.

Game 5 was an epic battle and was fought gallantly by both teams, however, the Mixers will not be denied their historic run and won the deciding battle by their sheer will with a score of 92–89. With this victory the team became the fourth team to win the Grand Slam, Yap was hailed the Finals MVP after finishing with 29 points, The game was really close until the fourth and the bailout period, but a run was made by the Mixers to stretch their lead to three with 16 seconds to go, The Elasto Painters failed to make four consecutive three point shots, to give the Mixers the win, this was the first time since 1996 a team won all conferences in one season.

==== 2014–2016: Rebrand to Star Hotshots ====
Logo used from 2014–2017.

On October 15, 2014, the San Miguel Pure Foods Company, Inc. announced that the team will revert to the Purefoods banner and will be named as the Purefoods Star Hotshots.

The Hotshots got the services of Don Allado and made his debut on October 26, 2014 against San Miguel.

On December 8, 2014, the Hotshots received Mick Pennisi for Ronnie Matias and Isaac Holstein after a trade.

They placed fifth in the final eliminations standings after having a 6–5 record, having a twice-to-beat disadvantage. The Hotshots got tied with Meralco and Barangay Ginebra San Miguel but they are the lowest on the quotient system.

The Hotshots lost to the Bolts in the first phase of the quarterfinals having a twice-to-beat disadvantage. They hardly-fought in a cold-game but they struggled until the end game, losing the game with the score off 77–65. The loss prevented Purefoods from getting a fifth straight championship and it's also the first time that the Hotshots did not qualify to the semis since the 2012 PBA Commissioner's Cup.

The Star Hotshots tapped the services of Marqus Blakely for the fifth time while search for bigger imports continues. Blakely is the smallest import recruited in the tournament, and they found a bigger import Daniel Orton but they have to wait until February as Orton's contract in the Chinese Basketball Association expires, prior to that Blakely will play until Orton comes and will sub for him if an injury occurs.

The Hotshots won their debut game of the tournament, 83–70 against GlobalPort. Blakely finished with 26 points, 18 rebounds and 7 blocks. On their second game, The Hotshots won against Alaska with a 20-point blowout. Alex Mallari lead the way with 17 points. They also won their third game, against Blackwater with the score of 98–86.

They also won their fourth game of the tournament, against NLEX, 87–62. Daniel Orton replaced Blakely and had an impressive debut by finishing with 16 points, 12 rebounds, 3 assists and blocks.

After a four-game winning streak, The Hotshots lost to Rain or Shine with the score of 78–71, this loss tallies their first loss of the tournament. Orton tallied 23 points. The Hotshots also loss to the expansion team Kia Carnival, 95–84. After the game, he called Kia playing-coach (now Senator) Manny Pacquiao as a basketball player, as well as the referees during that game "a joke". He was summoned by Salud two days after the incident and was fined by the Commissioner's Office PHP250,000 due to his comments. Subsequently, he was sent home by his team as confirmed by Purefoods' team governor Rene Pardo. Orton was replaced by the former import of the Hotshots, Denzel Bowles. The Hotshots lost to their bitter rival Barangay Ginebra tallying their third straight loss.

The Hotshots went on an 8–3 finish after the elimination round, they also won the quarterfinal series against Alaska in two games but they were defeated by the eventual champion Talk 'N Text in four games in their best-of-five series.

The Hotshots won the debut game of the tournament for them, defeating NLEX, 85–89. Blakely tallied 29 points, 18 rebounds, 7 assists and 6 blocks. Prior to the game, the franchise changed their name to Star Hotshots and reverted the team colors to red, yellow and white.

After their fifth-place finish in the elimination round, the Hotshots won their twice-to-win quarterfinal series against GlobalPort in two games including one which they broke the record for the most margin in a playoff game victory at 53. It is two point shy at the all-time record which is 55.

They lost to Alaska on their best-of-five semifinal series in three games.

On July 20, 2015, Assistant coach Jason Webb was promoted as the head coach of the Star Hotshots after Coach Tim Cone transferred to Ginebra. During Webb's reign as head coach, the Hotshots entered quarterfinals in the first two conferences but in the third conference they finished 11th place.

In the Philippine Cup, the Hotshots placed 9th in the eliminations. Then in the Quarterfinals Phase I, they faced the crowd favorite Barangay Ginebra, who has a twice-to-beat disadvantage, in a Christmas Clasico. The Hotshots lead as much as 18 points, but a huge 4th quarter disadvantage by Barangay Ginebra erased the lead as the game went into overtime. After back and forth treys, LA Tenorio shoots the game-winner trey and the Hotshots were bowed out of the conference.

In the Commissioners' Cup, they paraded Denzel Bowles, who after 5 games, was substituted by Ricardo Ratliffe. They placed 8th after the eliminations, and faced the first-seeded San Miguel Beermen, who had a twice-to-beat disadvantage. The Hotshots won the first game, which forces the Beermen to a do-or-die game, which they lost and Star was bowed out in the Quarterfinals.

In the Governor's Cup, their record was the worst of all of them, as they paraded imports Marques Blakely who after 4 games was replaced by Joel Wright, yet their performance has been a bust, only finishing 11th with a dismal 2-9 record finish and were eliminated early in the conference.

The 2015–16 PBA season is the second worst season of Purefoods Franchise.

On October 13, 2016, James Yap, who has been with the franchise for 12 years, was traded to the Rain or Shine Elasto Painters in exchange for Paul Lee in a big trade deal.

=== 2016–2019: Marc Pingris' later years ===
==== 2016–2017: Paul Lee's arrival ====
On October 14, 2016, former Kia deputy coach Chito Victolero was named as the new head coach of the Hotshots, replacing Jason Webb who served with the team for a full season.

In the first conference of Chito Victolero handling Purefoods Franchise, Star Hotshots placed third in the final eliminations standings after having a 7–4 record tied with Alaska. Star placed third because of head-to-head record against Alaska.

In the middle of elimination round of 2016–17 PBA Philippine Cup, Hotshots received Rome dela Rosa from Alaska Aces exchange for Jake Pascual in a one-on-one trade.

The Hotshots swept (2–0) the Phoenix Fuel Masters in the best-of-3 quarterfinals series but they were defeated by their arch-rival Barangay Ginebra San Miguel in the best-of-7 semifinals series after leading 2–0 and 3–2 in the series.

==== 2017–2019: Rebrand to Magnolia ====
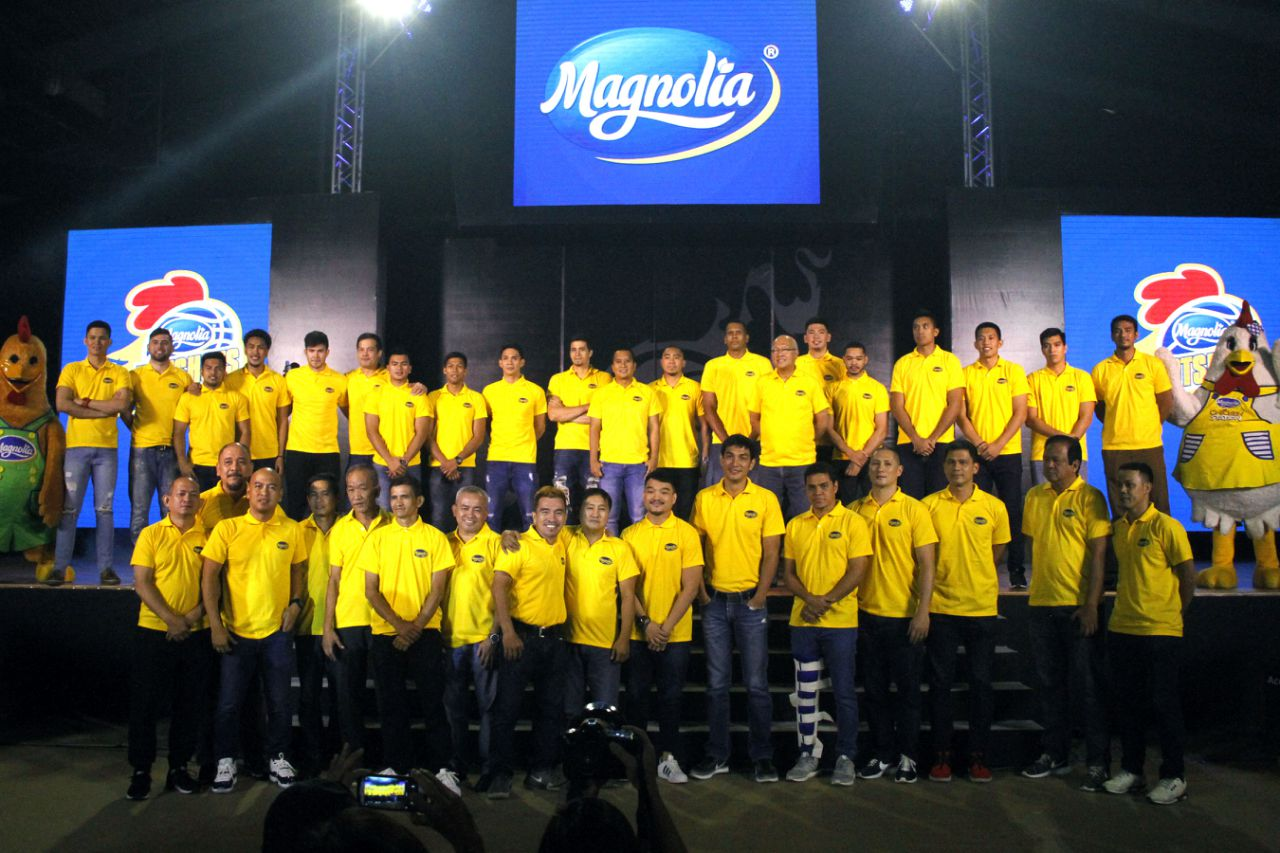
Formal press launch of the team re-branded as Magnolia Hotshots. November 27, 2017.

Magnolia Hotshots logo used from 2017 to 2020.

On November 27, 2017, the San Miguel Pure Foods Company, Inc. announced the team will be known as the Magnolia Hotshots in the 2017–18 PBA season. This will be the second San Miguel Corporation PBA franchise that will use the Magnolia name, as it was previously used by the San Miguel Beermen franchise in the 1985, 1986 and 2007–2008 PBA seasons.

After rebranding, the Hotshots became a force in the first conference of the 2017–18 season, as they are only behind at first-seeded San Miguel Beermen. With a twice-to-beat advantage, Magnolia defeated GlobalPort 86–79, erasing a 20-point lead. After defeating GlobalPort, Hotshots faced the NLEX Road Warriors coached by Yeng Guiao. In Game 1, the Road Warriors defeated them only by one point 88–87 that grabs a 1–0 lead. Before Game 2, Rene Pardo, the team governor of Hotshots confirmed that Marc Pingris can't play due to ACL and will be sit for the rest of the season due to an injury occurred in Game 1. The Pingris-less Hotshots win 99–84 to even the series. But the Hotshots seized a 106–99 Game 3 victory that made them leading the series. In Game 4, the Road Warriors ties the series with a 91–79 win, even though Sangalang have 15 points, it wasn't enough against Kiefer Ravena's 20-point effort. In Game 5, Hotshots grabs a win 87–78 to be near at finals spot. In Game 6, Hotshots cliched the finals spot by a 96–89 win with the heroics of Ian Sangalang who finished with 15 points and 11 rebounds for Magnolia, while Jio Jalalon had 11 points, 13 assists and two steals. Mark Barroca chipped in 14 points, 10 rebounds and 5 assists while Aldrech Ramos and Kyle Pascual combined for 20 markers in the win. The Game 6 win sets a finals duel against San Miguel Beermen.

In the Game 1 of the finals, Beermen dumped Hotshots to a 20-point lead, but the Hotshots come back and got the lead 1:23 left in the fourth after a Mark Barroca baseline jumper. Ian Sangalang added to their advantage with a basket inside but San Miguel's Marcio Lassiter tied the game 103–103 with a cold-blooded 3-pointer. With 16.5 seconds remaining, Sangalang drew a foul from June Mar Fajardo and converted on both free throws for a 105–103 advantage. Magnolia forced a miss from Alex Cabagnot with Rafi Reavis picking up the rebound and calling a timeout. Jio Jalalon was then fouled by Matt Ganuelas-Rosser, but the sophomore missed both free throws and fouled Chris Ross during the rebound play to give the Beermen one last shot. Reavis completed Magnolia's epic comeback with a block on Arwind Santos' game-tying attempt. Sangalang led Magnolia with 29 points in the game as Magnolia overcome a 2-of-13 shooting night from Lee to score the victory. But the Beermen won four straight games and clinched the title series.

=== 2020–present: The post-Pingris era ===
==== 2021–2025: Calvin Abueva's stint ====
Hotshots' logo until 2022

In 2021, the team arranged their name into Magnolia Pambansang Manok Hotshots. In 2022 PBA draft, the Hotshots removed the Pambansang Manok in the team's official name and replaced by Chicken Timplados. In 2024 PBA draft, the Hotshots drafted former Adamson Soaring Falcon Jerom Lastimosa and signed him to a 3-year contract.

== Current roster ==
Magnolia Chicken Timplados Hotshots roster
Players
Coaches

Pos.	#	POB	Name	Height	Weight	DOB (YYYY–MM–DD)	From
G	0	(Philippines)	Paolo Taha	6 ft 0 in (1.83 m)	180 lb (82 kg)	1990–12–05	St. Benilde
G/F	2	(Philippines)	Javi Gómez de Liaño	6 ft 3 in (1.91 m)	193 lb (88 kg)	1998–07–27	UP
G	3	(Philippines)	Paul Lee	6 ft 0 in (1.83 m)	200 lb (91 kg)	1989–02–14	UE
G	5	(Philippines)	LA Tenorio	5 ft 9 in (1.75 m)	151 lb (68 kg)	1984–07–09	Ateneo
G/F	6	(United States)	Chris Koon	6 ft 5 in (1.96 m)		2001–02–06	Ateneo
C	10	(Philippines)	Ian Sangalang	6 ft 7 in (2.01 m)	212 lb (96 kg)	1991–12–20	San Sebastian
G	13	(Italy)	Gab Gomez	5 ft 11 in (1.80 m)		2000–03–20	Ateneo
G	14	(Philippines)	Mark Barroca	5 ft 10 in (1.78 m)	170 lb (77 kg)	1986–04–25	Far Eastern
G	17	(Philippines)	Peter Alfaro	5 ft 11 in (1.80 m)		1998–12–17	San Beda
F	19	(United States)	Rome dela Rosa	6 ft 3 in (1.91 m)	185 lb (84 kg)	1990–12–11	San Beda
F	21	(Philippines)	Yukien Andrada	6 ft 5 in (1.96 m)		2001–04–21	San Beda
F	22	(United States)	Zavier Lucero	6 ft 6 in (1.98 m)	205 lb (93 kg)	1999–04–05	UP
C	23	(Philippines)	Clifford Jopia	6 ft 8 in (2.03 m)	220 lb (100 kg)	1998–05–11	San Beda
G	30	(Philippines)	Jerom Lastimosa	5 ft 11 in (1.80 m)		1998–07–01	Adamson
F	41	(United States)	Raffy Verano	6 ft 3 in (1.91 m)	200 lb (91 kg)	1997–11–16	Ateneo
C	42	(Australia)	James Laput	6 ft 10 in (2.08 m)	245 lb (111 kg)	1996–08–26	De La Salle
F/C	88	(Philippines)	Russel Escoto (injured)	6 ft 6 in (1.98 m)	200 lb (91 kg)	1992–12–04	Far Eastern

Head coach

- (Philippines) LA Tenorio

Assistant coach(es)

- (Philippines) Juno Sauler (1st assistant)
- (United States) Kirk Collier
- (Philippines) Angelito Esguerra
- (Philippines) Tonyboy Espinosa
- (Philippines) Monch Gavieres
- (Philippines) Mon Jose
- (Philippines) Jude Paulite
- (Philippines) Julian Ramos
- (Philippines) Paul Sorongon
- (Philippines) Erick Arejola (consultant)

Team manager

- (Philippines) Alvin Patrimonio

Legend

- (C) Team captain
- (CI) Commissioner's Cup Import
- (GI) Governors' Cup Import
- (EI) EASL Import
- (DP) Unsigned draft pick
- (FA) Free agent
- (IN) Inactive
- (S) Suspended
- (R) Rookie
- Injured

Roster

== Season-by-season records ==
List of the last five conferences completed by the Magnolia franchise. For the full-season history, see List of Magnolia Chicken Timplados Hotshots seasons.

Note: GP = Games played, W = Wins, L = Losses, W–L% = Winning percentage

Season	Conference	GP	W	L	W–L%	Finish	Playoffs
2024–25	Commissioner's	12	6	6	.500	8th	Lost in quarterfinals vs. NorthPort**, 110–113
2024–25	Philippine	11	8	3	.727	3rd	Lost in quarterfinals vs. TNT in two games
2025–26	Philippine	11	6	5	.545	6th	Lost in quarterfinals vs. TNT**, 109–118
2025–26	Commissioner's	12	7	5	.583	5th	Lost in quarterfinals vs. Meralco** in two games
2025–26	Governors' Cup	10	7	3	.700	1st (Group B)	Lost in quarterfinals vs. TNT, 0–3
An asterisk (*) indicates one-game playoff; two asterisks (**) indicate team with twice-to-beat advantage

== Awards ==
=== Individual awards ===
PBA Most Valuable Player	Finals MVP	PBA Best Player of the Conference
Alvin Patrimonio – 1991, 1993–1994, 1997; James Yap – 2005–06, 2009–10	Alvin Patrimonio – 1997 All-Filipino; Kerby Raymundo – 2002 Governors'; Marc Pingris – 2005–06 Philippine, 2012–13 Governors'; James Yap – 2009–10 Philippine, 2011–12 Commissioner's, 2013–14 Commissioner's, 2013–14 Governors'; Mark Barroca – 2013–14 Philippine, 2017–18 Governors'	Jerry Codiñera – 1994 All-Filipino, 1998 Governors'; Alvin Patrimonio – 1994 Commissioner's, 1996 All-Filipino, 1997 Governors'; Rey Evangelista – 2002 Governors'; James Yap – 2009–10 Philippine; Paul Lee – 2017–18 Governors'; Calvin Abueva – 2021 Philippine
PBA Rookie of the Year Award	PBA All-Defensive Team	PBA Mythical First Team
Jojo Lastimosa – 1988; Rico Maierhofer – 2009–10	Glenn Capacio – 1989–1995; Jerry Codiñera – 1989–1998; Dindo Pumaren – 1999–2000; Rey Evangelista – 2000–2002; Marc Pingris – 2005–06, 2009–14, 2015–16; Roger Yap – 2009–10; Mark Barroca – 2013–14, 2020; Jio Jalalon – 2015–16, 2021, 2022–23; Rome dela Rosa – 2017–18; Rafi Reavis – 2017–18; Zavier Lucero – 2024–25	Abet Guidaben – 1988; Alvin Patrimonio – 1989–1994, 1996–1998, 2000; Jerry Codiñera – 1993–1994, 1998; James Yap – 2005–06, 2009–10, 2011–12; Roger Yap – 2005–06; Kerby Raymundo – 2005–06; Mark Barroca – 2013–14; Paul Lee – 2017–18; Calvin Abueva – 2021
PBA Mythical Second Team	PBA Most Improved Player	PBA Sportsmanship Award
Jojo Lastimosa – 1988; Jerry Codiñera – 1988–1989, 1991–1992, 1997; Elmer Cabahug – 1992; Alvin Patrimonio – 1995; Dindo Pumaren – 1997, 2000; Bong Ravena – 1997; Noy Castillo – 2001; Rey Evangelista – 2002; Kerby Raymundo – 2002, 2007–08; Marc Pingris – 2005–06, 2012–14; Roger Yap – 2009–10; James Yap – 2010–11; Joe Devance – 2010–11; Peter June Simon – 2013–14; Mark Barroca – 2017–18; Ian Sangalang – 2019, 2021; Calvin Abueva – 2022–23; Zavier Lucero – 2024–25	Bong Ravena – 1997; Noy Castillo – 2001; Marc Pingris – 2005–06	Jerry Codiñera – 1994, 1996; Rey Evangelista – 1995, 1999, 2001
PBA Best Import		
Kenny Redfield – 1994 Commissioner's; Derrick Brown – 2000 Governors', 2002 Governors'; Marquin Chandler – 2005–06 Fiesta; Denzel Bowles – 2011–12 Commissioner's; Marqus Blakely – 2012–13 Governors'		

=== PBA Press Corps Individual Awards ===
Executive of the Year	Baby Dalupan Coach of the Year	Defensive Player of the Year
Simon Mossesgeld – 1997; Rene Pardo – 2005–06; Ramon S. Ang – 2013–14, 2016–17	Chot Reyes – 1993; Ryan Gregorio – 2002, 2005–06, 2009–10; Tim Cone – 2013–14; Chito Victolero – 2017–18	Jerry Codiñera – 1994; Marc Pingris – 2005–06, 2012–14; Jio Jalalon – 2022–23
Bogs Adornado Comeback Player of the Year	Mr. Quality Minutes	All-Rookie Team
Ian Sangalang 2023–24	Olsen Racela – 1993; Peter June Simon – 2007–08, 2013–14; KG Canaleta – 2009–10; Jio Jalalon – 2016–17	James Yap – 2004–05; Paul Artadi – 2004–05; Chico Lanete – 2007–08; Rico Maierhofer – 2009–10; Alex Mallari – 2012–13; Justin Melton – 2013–14; Ian Sangalang – 2013–14; Jio Jalalon – 2016–17; Robbie Herndon – 2017–18

=== All-Star Weekend ===
All Star MVP	Obstacle Challenge	Three-point Shootout	Slam Dunk Contest	All-Star Selection
Alvin Patrimonio – 1991; Peter June Simon – 2008; Marc Pingris – 2011; James Yap – 2012; Paul Lee – 2023	Richie Ticzon – 1994; Jonas Villanueva – 2011–2012; Mark Barroca – 2014	Elmer Cabahug – 1993; Boyet Fernandez – 2000–2001; James Yap – 2009; Allein Maliksi – 2017; Peter June Simon – 2019; Paul Lee – 2023	KG Canaleta – 2010; Justin Melton – 2014	1989: Nelson Asaytono; Jerry Codiñera; Jojo Lastimosa; Alvin Patrimonio; Dindo Pumaren; 1990: Nelson Asaytono; Jerry Codiñera; Jojo Lastimosa; Alvin Patrimonio; Dindo Pumaren; 1991: Nelson Asaytono; Jerry Codiñera; Alvin Patrimonio; Dindo Pumaren; 1992: Boy Cabahug; Jerry Codiñera; Alvin Patrimonio; Dindo Pumaren; 1993: Boy Cabahug; Jerry Codiñera; Alvin Patrimonio; Dindo Pumaren; 1994: Jerry Codiñera; 1995: Glenn Capacio; Jerry Codiñera; Rey Evangelista; Alvin Patrimonio; 1996: Jerry Codiñera; Rey Evangelista; Alvin Patrimonio; Dindo Pumaren; Rodney Santos; 1997: Cris Bolado; Jerry Codiñera; Rey Evangelista; Elmer Lago; Alvin Patrimonio; Dindo Pumaren; Bong Ravena; 1998: Jerry Codiñera; Rey Evangelista; Roy Hairston; Dindo Pumaren; Bong Ravena; 1999: Alvin Patrimonio; Andy Seigle; 2000: Noy Castillo; Alvin Patrimonio; Andy Seigle; 2001: Noy Castillo; Alvin Patrimonio; 2003: Kerby Raymundo; 2004: Paul Artadi; Jun Limpot; James Yap; 2005: Marc Pingris; Kerby Raymundo; James Yap; Roger Yap; 2006: Noy Castillo (did not show up); Kerby Raymundo; James Yap; Roger Yap; 2007: Kerby Raymundo; James Yap; Roger Yap; 2008: Kerby Raymundo; Peter June Simon; Enrico Villanueva; James Yap; 2009: Kerby Raymundo; Peter June Simon; Jhamar Thorpe (import); Enrico Villanueva; James Yap; 2010: Paul Artadi; Rico Maierhofer; Marc Pingris; James Yap; Roger Yap; 2011: Marc Pingris; Kerby Raymundo; Peter June Simon; James Yap; 2012: Mark Barroca; JC Intal; Marc Pingris; Josh Urbiztondo; James Yap; 2013: James Yap; 2014: Mark Barroca; Joe Devance; Marc Pingris; Peter June Simon; James Yap; 2015: Mark Barroca; Joe Devance; Justin Melton; Marc Pingris; Peter June Simon; James Yap; 2016: Mark Barroca; RR Garcia; Marc Pingris; James Yap; 2017: Mark Barroca; Jio Jalalon; Paul Lee; Allein Maliksi; Marc Pingris; Aldrech Ramos (did not play); Rafi Reavis; Peter June Simon; 2018: Mark Barroca; Jio Jalalon; Paul Lee; Marc Pingris; Rafi Reavis; Ian Sangalang (did not play); Peter June Simon; 2019: Mark Barroca; Jio Jalalon; Paul Lee; Peter June Simon; 2023: Calvin Abueva; Mark Barroca; Jio Jalalon; Paul Lee; 2024: Calvin Abueva; Mark Barroca; Aris Dionisio; Jio Jalalon; Paul Lee; Ian Sangalang; 2026: Zavier Lucero

== Notable players ==
=== Members of the PBA's 40 greatest players ===
- Jerry Codiñera – "The Defense Minister" played for Purefoods from 1988 to 1999; one of the top centers in the PBA during his stint with the team and was named Best Player of the Conference in 1994 and 1998
- Bernie Fabiosa – "The Sultan of Swipe" played for Purefoods in 1990.
- Ramon Fernandez – "El Presidente The Franchise Player" played for Purefoods for 2/3's of the 1988 as part of the purchase of the Tanduay franchise; led the team to the finals but was later traded to San Miguel and won the MVP honors
- Abet Guidaben – played for Purefoods in 1988 after being acquired from San Miguel for Mon Fernandez
- Freddie Hubalde – played for Purefoods in 1988 as part of the purchase of the Tanduay franchise but later moved to Shell in 1989.
- Jojo Lastimosa – "The Helicopter" played for Purefoods from 1988 to 1990 before being traded to Alaska. Was named Rookie of the Year in 1988.
- Ronnie Magsanoc – "The Point Laureate" played for Purefoods from 2001 to 2002; member of the 2002 Governors Cup title squad and was named Most Improved Player that same season.
- Alvin Patrimonio – "The Captain" played his entire career with the team (1988–2004) and was named the league's Most Valuable Player four times. Considered as the greatest player in franchise history.
- Marc Pingris – "Pinoy Sakuragi" played for the Purefoods franchise for 14 years known for his passionate Defense and empathic Rebounds
- Kerby Raymundo – "The Kid" played for Purefoods franchise and spent the most of his career for ten years from 2003 to 2013; known for his versatility, finesse, shooting prowess and his low post threat. Also a member of the PBA 40 Greatest Players club
- James Yap – "Big Game James", "Man with a Million Moves" played for the Purefoods franchise for 12 years before trading to Rain or Shine in Exchange of Paul Lee.

=== Other notable players ===
- Aaron Abril Aban
- Freddie Abuda (The Scavenger)
- Alvin Abundo
- Val Acuña
- Rommel Adducul (The General)
- Don Allado
- Richard "Chad" Alonzo
- Lester Alvarez
- Richard "Rich" Alvarez
- Paul Artadi (Kid Lightning)
- Nelson Asaytono (The Bull)
- Bonel Balingit (Gentle Giant)
- Chris Banchero
- Boyet Bautista
- Beau "Extra Rice" Belga
- Tyler Bey
- Ernesto "Egay" Billones (Billion Dollar Man)
- Cris Bolado (Jumbo)
- Rodney Brondial
- Ramon Paolo Bugia
- Mike Burtscher
- Brandon Cablay
- Celedon "Don" Camaso
- Niño "KG" Canaleta
- Tito "Noy" Castillo (The Golden Boy)
- JR Cawaling (The Sweet Shooter)
- Celino Cruz
- Mark Cruz (Antman)
- Rey Evangelista
- Edward Joseph "EJ" Feihl
- Teodorico "Boyet" Fernandez
- John Ferriols
- Jerwin Gaco
- RR Garcia
- Wesley Gonzales (Wild Wild Wes)
- Vicente Paul "Vince" Hizon (The Prince)
- Isaac Holstein
- Mike Hrabak
- John Christopher "J.C." Intal (The Rocket)
- Federico "Padim" Israel
- Alfredo "Pido" Jarencio (The Fireman)
- Abe King (The Chairman of the Boards)
- Chico Lanete
- Ardy Larong
- Eddie Laure
- Zandro "Jun" Limpot Jr. (The Main Man)
- Rico Maierhofer (The Kite)
- Alex Mallari
- John Billy Mamaril
- Ronnie Matias (Batas ni Matias)
- Leomar "Leo" Najorda
- Nuni Omot
- Mick Pennisi (The Slick)
- Jewel Ponferada
- Rodericko "Olsen" Racela (Rah-Rah)
- Topex Robinson (The Pitbull)
- Jondan Salvador
- Rodney Santos (The Slasher)
- Andrew John "Andy" Seigle
- Ervin Sotto
- Yousef Taha
- Chris Timberlake
- Norbert Torres (Bear)
- Josh Urbiztondo (The Fireball)
- Al Vergara
- Enrico Villanueva (The Raging Bull)
- Jonas Villanueva
- Rogelio "Roger" Yap
- Richard Yee

=== Imports ===
- (United States) Vernon Macklin
- (United States) Harold Arceneaux
- (United States) Tyler Bey
- (United States) Marqus Blakely (Mr. Everything) – BOBBY PARKS BEST IMPORT AWARDEE (2013 Governor's)
- (United States) Denzel Bowles (Monster Bowles) – BEST IMPORT AWARDEE (2012 Commissioner's)
- (United States) Marquin Chandler – BEST IMPORT AWARDEE
- (United States) Lorenzo Coleman
- (United States) Lenny Cooke
- (United States) Eddie Elisma (Electric Eddie)
- (United States) Ronnie Grandison
- (United States) Ray Hall ('Sugar' Ray)
- (United States) Antonio Hester
- (United States) Dennis Hopson
- (United States) Byron Irvin
- (United States) Darryl Johnson
- (United States) James Mays (Mr. Everywhere)
- (United States) Tharon Mayes
- (United States) Bob McCann
- (United States) Erik McCree
- (Brazil) Fab Melo
- (United States) Lance Miller
- (United States) Tony Mitchell
- (United States) Perry Moss
- (United States) Rodney Monroe
- (United States) Chris Morris
- (Nigeria) Julius Nwosu (The Juice)
- (United States) Daniel Orton
- (United States) Daren Queenan
- (Serbia) Nick Rakocevic
- (United States) Ricardo Ratliffe
- (United States) Kenny Redfield (Mr. Triple Double) – BEST IMPORT AWARDEE
- (Morocco) Reda Rhalimi – 1st Moroccan import in the PBA
- (United States) Darius Rice
- (United States) Matt Rogers (temporary import)
- (United States) Rob Rose
- (United States) Walker Russell
- (United States) Dexter Shouse
- (United States) Clinton Smith
- (United States) Carey Scurry
- (United States) Jay Taylor
- (United States) David Thirdkill (The Sheriff)
- (United States) Kenny Travis
- (United States) Lorrenzo Wade
- (United States) Kennard Winchester
- (United States) David Wood
- (United States) Perry Young

=== Retired numbers ===
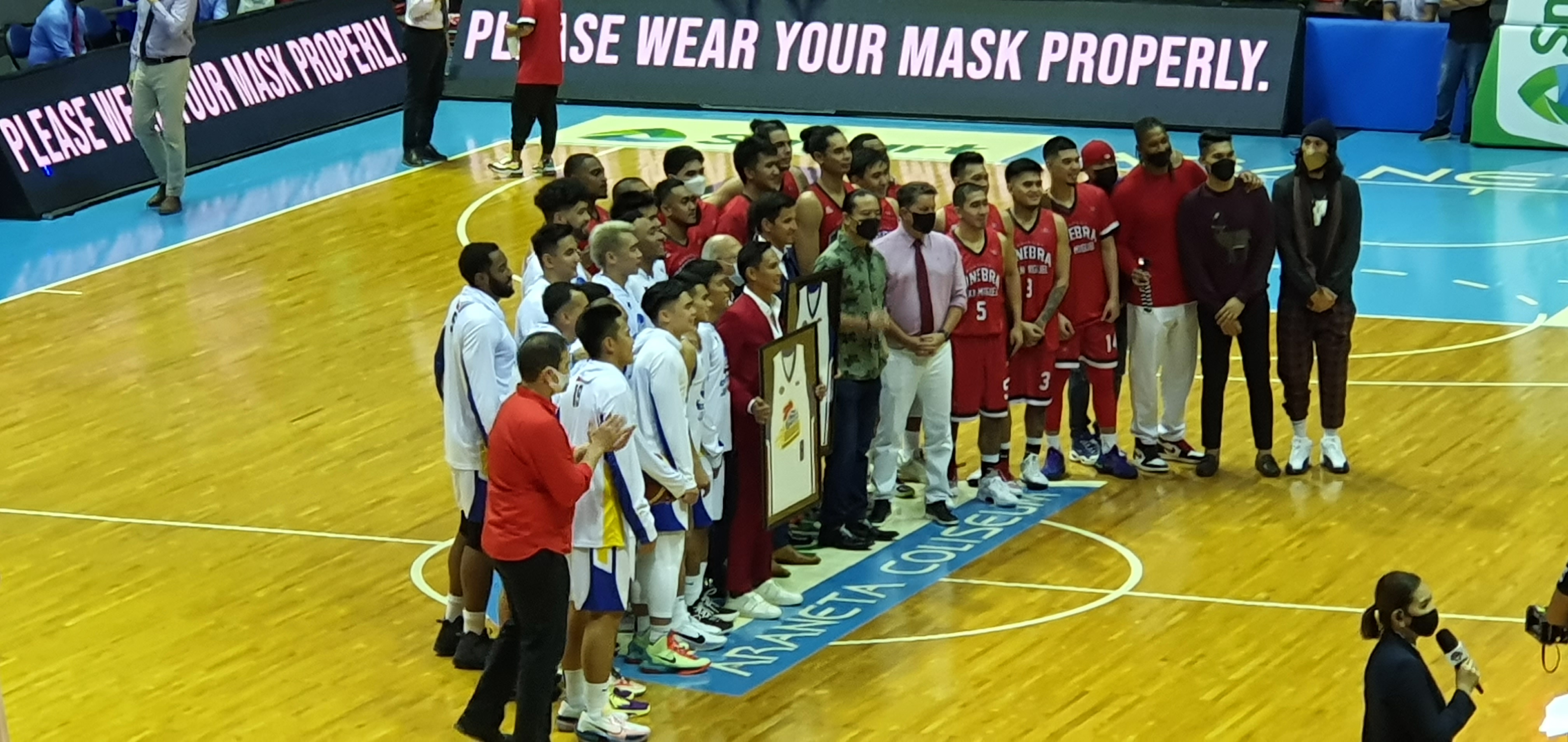
Mark Pingris and Peter June Simon poses with their framed retired jerseys together with the players of Magnolia Hotshots and Barangay Ginebra San Miguel during their jersey retirement ceremony held at halftime between the two teams on December 25, 2021.

Magnolia Chicken Timplados Hotshots retired numbers
N°	Player	Position	Tenure
7	Rey Evangelista	F	1994–2008^{[a]}
8	Peter June Simon	G	2004–2020^{[b]}
15	Marc Pingris	F	2005–2008; 2009–2019^{[b]}
16	Alvin Patrimonio	F	1988–2004
44	Jerry Codiñera	C	1988–1999^{[a]}

- ^{a} – Retired on November 9, 2014
- ^{b} – Retired on December 25, 2021

== Head coaches ==
Name	Start	End	Seasons	Overall Record				Best finish
Name	Start	End	Seasons	W	L	PCT	GP	Best finish
Ramon Fernandez	1988	1988	1	18	13	.581	31	Finals
Cris Calilan	1988	1989	2	16	23	.410	39	Finals
Baby Dalupan	1989	1991	3	73	57	.562	130	Champions
Ely Capacio	1991	1992	2	24	30	.444	54	Champions
Domingo Panganiban	1992	1992	1	23	23	.500	46	Finals
Chot Reyes	1993	1996	4	135	116	.538	251	Champions
Eric Altamirano	1997	1998	2	42	42	.500	84	Champions
Eric Altamirano	2001	2001	1	22	23	.489	45	Semifinals
Chito Narvasa	1998	1998	1	19	19	.500	38	Semifinals
Derrick Pumaren	1999	2000	2	47	49	.490	96	Finals
Ryan Gregorio	2002	2010	8	195	201	.492	396	Champions
Jorge Gallent	2010	2011	1	20	24	.455	44	Semifinals
Tim Cone	2011	2015	4	142	100	.587	242	Champions
Jason Webb	2015	2016	1	12	24	.333	36	Quarterfinals
Chito Victolero	2016	2025	6	159	105	.602	264	Champions
